= Ice hockey at the 2018 Winter Olympics – Women's team rosters =

These were the team rosters of the nations participating in the women's ice hockey tournament of the 2018 Winter Olympics.

== Group A ==
=== Canada ===
The following is the Canadian roster for the women's ice hockey tournament at the 2018 Winter Olympics.

Head coach: (Canada) Laura Schuler Assistant coaches: (Canada) Dwayne Gylywoychuk, (Canada) Troy Ryan

No.	Pos.	Name	Height	Weight	Birthdate	Birthplace	2017–18 team
1	G	Shannon Szabados	5 ft 8 in (1.73 m)	141 lb (64 kg)	August 6, 1986	Edmonton, Alberta	(Canada) National Women's Team
2	F	Meghan Agosta – A	5 ft 7 in (1.70 m)	148 lb (67 kg)	February 12, 1987	Windsor, Ontario	(Canada) National Women's Team
3	D	Jocelyne Larocque – A	5 ft 6 in (1.68 m)	146 lb (66 kg)	May 19, 1988	Ste. Anne, Manitoba	(Canada) Markham Thunder (CWHL)
4	D	Brigette Lacquette	5 ft 6 in (1.68 m)	181 lb (82 kg)	November 10, 1992	Dauphin, Manitoba	(Canada) Calgary Inferno (CWHL)
5	D	Lauriane Rougeau	5 ft 8 in (1.73 m)	168 lb (76 kg)	April 12, 1990	Pointe-Claire, Quebec	(Canada) Les Canadiennes (CWHL)
6	F	Rebecca Johnston	5 ft 9 in (1.75 m)	148 lb (67 kg)	September 24, 1989	Sudbury, Ontario	(Canada) Calgary Inferno (CWHL)
7	F	Laura Stacey	5 ft 10 in (1.78 m)	157 lb (71 kg)	May 5, 1994	Mississauga, Ontario	(Canada) Markham Thunder (CWHL)
8	D	Laura Fortino	5 ft 4 in (1.63 m)	137 lb (62 kg)	January 30, 1991	Hamilton, Ontario	(Canada) Markham Thunder (CWHL)
9	F	Jenn Wakefield	5 ft 10 in (1.78 m)	176 lb (80 kg)	June 15, 1989	Scarborough, Ontario	(Canada) National Women's Team
11	F	Jillian Saulnier	5 ft 5 in (1.65 m)	146 lb (66 kg)	March 7, 1992	Halifax, Nova Scotia	(Canada) Calgary Inferno (CWHL)
12	D	Meaghan Mikkelson	5 ft 9 in (1.75 m)	150 lb (68 kg)	January 4, 1985	Regina, Saskatchewan	(Canada) Calgary Inferno (CWHL)
14	D	Renata Fast	5 ft 6 in (1.68 m)	143 lb (65 kg)	October 6, 1994	Hamilton, Ontario	(Canada) Toronto Furies (CWHL)
15	F	Mélodie Daoust	5 ft 4 in (1.63 m)	157 lb (71 kg)	January 7, 1992	Valleyfield, Quebec	(Canada) Les Canadiennes (CWHL)
17	F	Bailey Bram	5 ft 8 in (1.73 m)	139 lb (63 kg)	September 5, 1990	Winnipeg, Manitoba	(Canada) Calgary Inferno (CWHL)
19	F	Brianne Jenner – A	5 ft 9 in (1.75 m)	157 lb (71 kg)	May 4, 1991	Oakville, Ontario	(Canada) Calgary Inferno (CWHL)
20	F	Sarah Nurse	5 ft 9 in (1.75 m)	148 lb (67 kg)	January 4, 1995	Hamilton, Ontario	(United States) University of Wisconsin (WCHA)
21	F	Haley Irwin	5 ft 7 in (1.70 m)	170 lb (77 kg)	June 6, 1988	Thunder Bay, Ontario	(Canada) Calgary Inferno (CWHL)
24	F	Natalie Spooner	5 ft 10 in (1.78 m)	181 lb (82 kg)	October 17, 1990	Scarborough, Ontario	(Canada) Toronto Furies (CWHL)
26	F	Emily Clark	5 ft 7 in (1.70 m)	134 lb (61 kg)	November 28, 1995	Saskatoon, Saskatchewan	(United States) University of Wisconsin (WCHA)
29	F	Marie-Philip Poulin – C	5 ft 7 in (1.70 m)	161 lb (73 kg)	March 28, 1991	Quebec City, Quebec	(Canada) Les Canadiennes (CWHL)
31	G	Geneviève Lacasse	5 ft 8 in (1.73 m)	152 lb (69 kg)	May 5, 1989	Montreal, Quebec	(Canada) Calgary Inferno (CWHL)
35	G	Ann-Renée Desbiens	5 ft 9 in (1.75 m)	161 lb (73 kg)	April 10, 1994	La Malbaie, Quebec	(Canada) National Women's Team
40	F	Blayre Turnbull	5 ft 7 in (1.70 m)	159 lb (72 kg)	July 15, 1993	New Glasgow, Nova Scotia	(Canada) Calgary Inferno (CWHL)

=== Finland ===
The Finnish roster for the women's ice hockey tournament at the 2018 Winter Olympics was published on 22 January 2018.

Head coach: (Finland) Pasi Mustonen Assistant coaches: (Finland) Juuso Toivola

No.	Pos.	Name	Height	Weight	Birthdate	Birthplace	2017–18 team
1	G	Eveliina Suonpää	1.74 m (5 ft 9 in)	64 kg (141 lb)	12 April 1995	Kiukainen	(Finland) Lukko (Liiga)
2	D	Isa Rahunen	1.65 m (5 ft 5 in)	66 kg (146 lb)	16 April 1993	Kuopio	(Finland) Kärpät (Liiga)
4	D	Rosa Lindstedt	1.86 m (6 ft 1 in)	80 kg (180 lb)	24 January 1988	Ylöjärvi	(Sweden) HV71 (SDHL)
6	D	Jenni Hiirikoski – C	1.61 m (5 ft 3 in)	62 kg (137 lb)	30 March 1987	Lempäälä	(Sweden) Luleå HF (SDHL)
7	D	Mira Jalosuo	1.84 m (6 ft 0 in)	80 kg (180 lb)	3 February 1989	Lieksa	(Finland) Kärpät (Liiga)
8	D	Ella Viitasuo	1.72 m (5 ft 8 in)	66 kg (146 lb)	27 May 1996	Lahti	(Finland) Espoo Blues (Liiga)
9	F	Venla Hovi	1.69 m (5 ft 7 in)	67 kg (148 lb)	28 October 1987	Tampere	(Canada) Univ. of Manitoba (U SPORTS)
10	F	Linda Välimäki	1.66 m (5 ft 5 in)	72 kg (159 lb)	31 May 1990	Ylöjärvi	(Finland) Ilves (Liiga)
11	F	Annina Rajahuhta	1.64 m (5 ft 5 in)	69 kg (152 lb)	8 March 1989	Helsinki	(China) Kunlun Red Star (CWHL)
13	F	Riikka Välilä – A	1.63 m (5 ft 4 in)	60 kg (130 lb)	12 June 1973	Jyväskylä	(Sweden) HV71 (SDHL)
15	D	Minnamari Tuominen	1.65 m (5 ft 5 in)	71 kg (157 lb)	26 June 1990	Helsinki	(Finland) Espoo Blues (Liiga)
18	G	Meeri Räisänen	1.70 m (5 ft 7 in)	62 kg (137 lb)	2 December 1989	Tampere	(Finland) HPK (Liiga)
19	F	Petra Nieminen	1.69 m (5 ft 7 in)	64 kg (141 lb)	4 May 1999	Tampere	(Finland) Team Kuortane (Liiga)
22	F	Emma Nuutinen	1.76 m (5 ft 9 in)	73 kg (161 lb)	7 December 1996	Vantaa	(United States) Mercyhurst University (NCAA)
23	F	Sanni Hakala	1.53 m (5 ft 0 in)	56 kg (123 lb)	31 October 1997	Jyväskylä	(Sweden) HV71 (SDHL)
24	F	Noora Tulus	1.65 m (5 ft 5 in)	67 kg (148 lb)	15 August 1995	Vantaa	(Sweden) Luleå HF (SDHL)
26	F	Sara Säkkinen	1.62 m (5 ft 4 in)	61 kg (134 lb)	7 April 1998	Tampere	(Finland) Team Kuortane (Liiga)
27	F	Saila Saari	1.70 m (5 ft 7 in)	62 kg (137 lb)	1 November 1989	Alavus	(Finland) Kärpät (Liiga)
33	F	Michelle Karvinen – A	1.67 m (5 ft 6 in)	70 kg (150 lb)	27 March 1990	Rødovre, Denmark	(Sweden) Luleå HF (SDHL)
41	G	Noora Räty	1.64 m (5 ft 5 in)	65 kg (143 lb)	29 May 1989	Espoo	(China) Kunlun Red Star (CWHL)
61	F	Tanja Niskanen	1.76 m (5 ft 9 in)	69 kg (152 lb)	9 November 1992	Juankoski	(Finland) KalPa (Liiga)
77	F	Susanna Tapani	1.75 m (5 ft 9 in)	60 kg (130 lb)	2 March 1993	Laitila	(Finland) Lukko (Liiga)
88	D	Ronja Savolainen	1.76 m (5 ft 9 in)	70 kg (150 lb)	29 November 1997	Helsinki	(Sweden) Luleå HF (SDHL)

=== Olympic Athletes from Russia ===
The following is the Olympic Athletes from Russia roster for the women's ice hockey tournament at the 2018 Winter Olympics.

Head coach: (Russia) Alexei Chistyakov Assistant coach: (Russia) Alexander Vedernikov

No.	Pos.	Name	Height	Weight	Birthdate	Birthplace	2017–18 team
1	G	Valeria Tarakanova	1.83 m (6 ft 0 in)	89 kg (196 lb)	20 June 1998	Zavolzhye	(Russia) SKIF Nizhny Novgorod (RWHL)
2	D	Angelina Goncharenko	1.78 m (5 ft 10 in)	73 kg (161 lb)	23 May 1994	Moscow	(Russia) HC Tornado (RWHL)
10	F	Liudmila Belyakova	1.70 m (5 ft 7 in)	65 kg (143 lb)	12 August 1994	Moscow	(Russia) HC Tornado (RWHL)
11	D	Liana Ganeyeva	1.65 m (5 ft 5 in)	62 kg (137 lb)	20 December 1997	Staroe Baisarovo	(Russia) Arktik-Universitet Ukhta (RWHL)
12	D	Yekaterina Lobova	1.67 m (5 ft 6 in)	64 kg (141 lb)	25 October 1998	Novosibirsk	(Russia) Biryusa Krasnoyarsk (RWHL)
13	D	Nina Pirogova	1.73 m (5 ft 8 in)	68 kg (150 lb)	26 January 1999	Moscow	(Russia) HC Tornado (RWHL)
15	F	Valeria Pavlova	1.79 m (5 ft 10 in)	82 kg (181 lb)	15 April 1995	Tyumen	(Russia) Biryusa Krasnoyarsk (RWHL)
17	F	Fanuza Kadirova	1.62 m (5 ft 4 in)	58 kg (128 lb)	6 April 1998	Kukmor	(Russia) Arktik-Universitet Ukhta (RWHL)
18	F	Olga Sosina – C	1.63 m (5 ft 4 in)	75 kg (165 lb)	27 July 1992	Almetyevsk	(Russia) Agidel Ufa (RWHL)
22	D	Maria Batalova – A	1.73 m (5 ft 8 in)	67 kg (148 lb)	3 May 1996		(Russia) HC Tornado (RWHL)
28	F	Diana Kanayeva	1.72 m (5 ft 8 in)	63 kg (139 lb)	27 March 1997	Naberezhnye Chelny	(Russia) HC Dinamo Saint Petersburg (RWHL)
31	G	Nadezhda Alexandrova	1.72 m (5 ft 8 in)	63 kg (139 lb)	3 January 1986	Moscow, Soviet Union	(Russia) HC Tornado (RWHL)
34	D	Svetlana Tkacheva	1.69 m (5 ft 7 in)	56 kg (123 lb)	3 November 1984	Moscow, Soviet Union	(Russia) HC Tornado (RWHL)
43	F	Yekaterina Likhachyova	1.71 m (5 ft 7 in)	63 kg (139 lb)	24 August 1998	Kirovo-Chepetsk	(Russia) SKIF Nizhni Novgorod (RWHL)
44	F	Alyona Starovoitova	1.73 m (5 ft 8 in)	67 kg (148 lb)	22 October 1999	Moscow	(Russia) HC Tornado (RWHL)
59	F	Yelena Dergachyova – A	1.59 m (5 ft 3 in)	55 kg (121 lb)	8 November 1995	Moscow	(Russia) HC Tornado (RWHL)
68	F	Alevtina Shtaryova	1.73 m (5 ft 8 in)	67 kg (148 lb)	9 February 1997	Moscow	(Russia) HC Tornado
73	F	Viktoria Kulishova	1.70 m (5 ft 7 in)	60 kg (132 lb)	12 August 1999	Tyumen	(Russia) SKIF Nizhny Novgorod (RWHL)
76	D	Yekaterina Nikolayeva	1.67 m (5 ft 6 in)	65 kg (143 lb)	5 October 1995	Saratov	(Russia) HC Dinamo Saint Petersburg (RWHL)
88	F	Yekaterina Smolina	1.62 m (5 ft 4 in)	62 kg (137 lb)	8 October 1988	Ust-Kamenogorsk, Kazakh SSR, Soviet Union	(Russia) HC Dinamo Saint Petersburg (RWHL)
92	G	Nadezhda Morozova	1.70 m (5 ft 7 in)	85 kg (187 lb)	29 November 1996	Moscow	(Russia) Biryusa Krasnoyarsk (RWHL)
94	F	Yevgenia Dyupina	1.71 m (5 ft 7 in)	62 kg (137 lb)	30 June 1994	Glazov	(Russia) HC Dinamo Saint Petersburg (RWHL)
97	F	Anna Shokhina	1.70 m (5 ft 7 in)	69 kg (152 lb)	23 June 1997	Novosinkovo	(Russia) HC Tornado (RWHL)

=== United States ===
The following is the United States roster for the women's ice hockey tournament at the 2018 Winter Olympics.

Head coach: (United States) Robb Stauber Assistant coaches: (United States) Brett Strot, (United States) Paul Mara Video Coach: (United States) Nick Laurila

No.	Pos.	Name	Height	Weight	Birthdate	Birthplace	2017–18 team
2	D	Lee Stecklein	6 ft 0 in (1.83 m)	174 lb (79 kg)	23 April 1994 (aged 23)	Roseville, Minnesota	(United States) Univ. of Minnesota
3	D	Cayla Barnes	5 ft 1 in (1.55 m)	146 lb (66 kg)	7 January 1999 (aged 19)	Corona, California	(United States) Boston College
5	D	Megan Keller	5 ft 11 in (1.80 m)	161 lb (73 kg)	1 May 1996 (aged 21)	Farmington Hills, Michigan	(United States) Boston College
6	D	Kali Flanagan	5 ft 4 in (1.63 m)	141 lb (64 kg)	19 September 1995 (aged 22)	Hudson, New Hampshire	(United States) Boston College
7	F	Monique Lamoureux-Morando	5 ft 6 in (1.68 m)	148 lb (67 kg)	3 July 1989 (aged 28)	Grand Forks, North Dakota	(United States) Minnesota Whitecaps
8	D	Emily Pfalzer	5 ft 3 in (1.60 m)	126 lb (57 kg)	14 June 1993 (aged 24)	Buffalo, New York	(United States) Buffalo Beauts
10	F	Meghan Duggan – C	5 ft 10 in (1.78 m)	163 lb (74 kg)	3 September 1987 (aged 30)	Danvers, Massachusetts	(United States) Boston Pride
11	F	Haley Skarupa	5 ft 6 in (1.68 m)	141 lb (64 kg)	3 January 1994 (aged 24)	Rockville, Maryland	(United States) Boston Pride
12	F	Kelly Pannek	5 ft 8 in (1.73 m)	165 lb (75 kg)	29 December 1995 (aged 22)	Plymouth, Minnesota	(United States) Univ. of Minnesota
14	F	Brianna Decker – A	5 ft 4 in (1.63 m)	150 lb (68 kg)	13 May 1991 (aged 26)	Dousman, Wisconsin	(United States) Boston Pride
17	F	Jocelyne Lamoureux-Davidson	5 ft 6 in (1.68 m)	150 lb (68 kg)	3 July 1989 (aged 28)	Grand Forks, North Dakota	(United States) Minnesota Whitecaps
19	F	Gigi Marvin	5 ft 8 in (1.73 m)	159 lb (72 kg)	7 March 1987 (aged 30)	Warroad, Minnesota	(United States) Boston Pride
20	F	Hannah Brandt	5 ft 6 in (1.68 m)	150 lb (68 kg)	27 November 1993 (aged 24)	Vadnais Heights, Minnesota	(United States) Minnesota Whitecaps
21	F	Hilary Knight	5 ft 11 in (1.80 m)	174 lb (79 kg)	12 July 1989 (aged 28)	Sun Valley, Idaho	(United States) Boston Pride
22	D	Kacey Bellamy – A	5 ft 7 in (1.70 m)	146 lb (66 kg)	22 April 1987 (aged 30)	Westfield, Massachusetts	(United States) Boston Pride
23	D	Sidney Morin	5 ft 5 in (1.65 m)	128 lb (58 kg)	6 June 1995 (aged 22)	Minnetonka, Minnesota	(Sweden) Modo Hockey
24	F	Dani Cameranesi	5 ft 5 in (1.65 m)	148 lb (67 kg)	30 June 1995 (aged 22)	Plymouth, Minnesota	(United States) Univ. of Minnesota
26	F	Kendall Coyne	5 ft 2 in (1.57 m)	123 lb (56 kg)	25 May 1992 (aged 25)	Palos Heights, Illinois	(United States) Minnesota Whitecaps
28	F	Amanda Kessel	5 ft 5 in (1.65 m)	137 lb (62 kg)	28 August 1991 (aged 26)	Madison, Wisconsin	(United States) Metropolitan Riveters
29	G	Nicole Hensley	5 ft 7 in (1.70 m)	154 lb (70 kg)	23 June 1994 (aged 23)	Lakewood, Colorado	(United States) Lindenwood Univ.
33	G	Alex Rigsby	5 ft 7 in (1.70 m)	150 lb (68 kg)	3 January 1992 (aged 26)	Delafield, Wisconsin	(United States) Minnesota Whitecaps
35	G	Maddie Rooney	5 ft 5 in (1.65 m)	146 lb (66 kg)	1 July 1997 (aged 20)	Andover, Minnesota	(United States) Univ. of Minnesota Duluth
37	F	Amanda Pelkey	5 ft 3 in (1.60 m)	134 lb (61 kg)	29 May 1993 (aged 24)	Montpelier, Vermont	(United States) Boston Pride

== Group B ==
=== Japan ===
The following is the Japan roster for the women's ice hockey tournament at the 2018 Winter Olympics.

Head coach: (Japan) Takeshi Yamanaka Assistant coaches: (Japan) Yuji Iizuka, (Japan) Masahito Haruna

No.	Pos.	Name	Height	Weight	Birthdate	2017–18 team
1	G	Nana Fujimoto	1.64 m (5 ft 5 in)	56 kg (123 lb)	3 March 1989	(Japan) Vortex Sapporo
2	D	Shiori Koike	1.59 m (5 ft 3 in)	52 kg (115 lb)	21 March 1993	(Japan) DK Peregrine
4	D	Ayaka Toko	1.61 m (5 ft 3 in)	58 kg (128 lb)	22 August 1994	(Japan) Seibu Princess Rabbits
6	D	Sena Suzuki – A	1.67 m (5 ft 6 in)	58 kg (128 lb)	4 August 1991	(Japan) Seibu Princess Rabbits
7	D	Mika Hori	1.63 m (5 ft 4 in)	54 kg (119 lb)	17 February 1992	(Japan) Toyota Cygnus
8	D	Akane Hosoyamada – A	1.63 m (5 ft 4 in)	59 kg (130 lb)	9 March 1992	(Japan) DK Peregrine
9	D	Aina Takeuchi	1.67 m (5 ft 6 in)	65 kg (143 lb)	16 August 1991	(Japan) Daishin
10	F	Haruna Yoneyama	1.60 m (5 ft 3 in)	55 kg (121 lb)	7 November 1991	(Japan) DK Peregrine
11	F	Yurie Adachi	1.55 m (5 ft 1 in)	51 kg (112 lb)	26 April 1985	(Japan) Seibu Princess Rabbits
12	F	Chiho Osawa – C	1.62 m (5 ft 4 in)	63 kg (139 lb)	10 February 1992	(Japan) DK Peregrine
13	F	Moeko Fujimoto	1.55 m (5 ft 1 in)	55 kg (121 lb)	5 August 1992	(Japan) Toyota Cygnus
14	F	Haruka Toko	1.67 m (5 ft 6 in)	64 kg (141 lb)	16 March 1997	(Japan) Seibu Princess Rabbits
15	F	Rui Ukita	1.69 m (5 ft 7 in)	71 kg (157 lb)	6 June 1996	(Japan) Daishin
16	F	Naho Terashima	1.57 m (5 ft 2 in)	58 kg (128 lb)	2 May 1993	(Japan) Daishin
18	F	Suzuka Taka	1.60 m (5 ft 3 in)	51 kg (112 lb)	16 October 1996	(Japan) DK Peregrine
19	F	Miho Shishiuchi	1.64 m (5 ft 5 in)	59 kg (130 lb)	21 August 1992	(Japan) Toyota Cygnus
21	F	Hanae Kubo	1.68 m (5 ft 6 in)	64 kg (141 lb)	10 December 1982	(Japan) Seibu Princess Rabbits
22	F	Tomomi Iwahara	1.61 m (5 ft 3 in)	58 kg (128 lb)	19 December 1987	(Japan) Seibu Princess Rabbits
23	F	Ami Nakamura	1.62 m (5 ft 4 in)	64 kg (141 lb)	15 November 1987	(Japan) Seibu Princess Rabbits
27	F	Shoko Ono	1.58 m (5 ft 2 in)	59 kg (130 lb)	5 September 1981	(Japan) FTS Mikage Gretz
28	D	Aoi Shiga	1.65 m (5 ft 5 in)	57 kg (126 lb)	4 July 1999	(Japan) Obihiro Ladies
29	G	Mai Kondo	1.66 m (5 ft 5 in)	56 kg (123 lb)	4 April 1992	(Japan) FTS Mikage Gretz
30	G	Akane Konishi	1.66 m (5 ft 5 in)	61 kg (134 lb)	14 August 1995	(Japan) Seibu Princess Rabbits

=== Korea ===
The following is the Korean roster for the women's ice hockey tournament at the 2018 Winter Olympics.

Head coach: (Canada) Sarah Murray Assistant coaches: (South Korea) Kim Do-yun, (North Korea) Pak Chol-ho, (United States) Rebecca Baker

No.	Pos.	Name	Height	Weight	Birthdate	2017–18 team
1	G	Genny Kim Knowles	1.60 m (5.2 ft)	60 kg (130 lb)	25 April 2000	(South Korea) Phoenix
2	F	Ko Hye-in	1.63 m (5.3 ft)	68 kg (150 lb)	18 July 1994	(South Korea) Ice Avengers
3	D	Eom Su-yeon	1.68 m (5.5 ft)	60 kg (130 lb)	1 February 2001	(South Korea) Ice Avengers
4	F	Kim Un-hyang	1.57 m (5.2 ft)	59 kg (130 lb)	10 December 1992	(North Korea) Kanggye
5	F	Caroline Park	1.59 m (5.2 ft)	56 kg (123 lb)	18 November 1989	(South Korea) Phoenix
6	F	Choi Yu-jung	1.56 m (5.1 ft)	56 kg (123 lb)	27 March 2000	(South Korea) Ice Beat
7	F	Danelle Im	1.62 m (5.3 ft)	55 kg (121 lb)	21 January 1993	(South Korea) Phoenix
8	D	Kim Se-lin	1.56 m (5.1 ft)	60 kg (130 lb)	3 April 2000	(South Korea) Ice Avengers
9	F	Park Jong-ah – C	1.60 m (5.2 ft)	59 kg (130 lb)	13 June 1996	(South Korea) Ice Avengers
10	F	Choi Ji-yeon	1.59 m (5.2 ft)	52 kg (115 lb)	21 August 1998	(South Korea) Ice Avengers
11	D	Park Ye-eun	1.62 m (5.3 ft)	54 kg (119 lb)	28 May 1996	(South Korea) Ice Beat
12	F	Kim Hee-won	1.64 m (5.4 ft)	55 kg (121 lb)	1 August 2001	(South Korea) Ice Avengers
13	F	Lee Eun-ji	1.54 m (5.1 ft)	48 kg (106 lb)	8 March 2001	(South Korea) Phoenix
14	F	Ryo Song-hui	1.57 m (5.2 ft)	61 kg (134 lb)	15 January 1994	(North Korea) Taesongsan
15	D	Park Chae-lin	1.58 m (5.2 ft)	52 kg (115 lb)	17 December 1998	(South Korea) Ice Beat
16	F	Jo Su-sie – A	1.62 m (5.3 ft)	55 kg (121 lb)	9 September 1994	(South Korea) Ice Beat
17	F	Han Soo-jin	1.69 m (5.5 ft)	63 kg (139 lb)	22 September 1987	(South Korea) Ice Beat
18	F	Kim Un-jong	1.56 m (5.1 ft)	63 kg (139 lb)	28 October 1992	(North Korea) Taesongsan
20	G	Han Do-hee	1.59 m (5.2 ft)	60 kg (130 lb)	16 November 1994	(South Korea) Ice Avengers
21	F	Lee Yeon-jeong	1.60 m (5.2 ft)	52 kg (115 lb)	2 November 1994	(South Korea) Ice Beat
22	F	Jung Si-yun	1.71 m (5.6 ft)	64 kg (141 lb)	8 September 2000	(South Korea) Ice Avengers
23	D	Park Yoon-jung – A	1.71 m (5.6 ft)	65 kg (143 lb)	18 December 1992	(South Korea) Phoenix
24	D	Cho Mi-hwan	1.60 m (5.2 ft)	58 kg (128 lb)	30 March 1995	(South Korea) Ice Avengers
25	G	Ri Pom	1.63 m (5.3 ft)	62 kg (137 lb)	28 May 1995	(North Korea) Sajabong
26	F	Kim Hyang-mi	1.62 m (5.3 ft)	72 kg (159 lb)	10 February 1995	(North Korea) Taesongsan
27	F	Jong Su-hyon	1.60 m (5.2 ft)	58 kg (128 lb)	10 October 1996	(North Korea) Taesongsan
29	F	Lee Jin-gyu	1.63 m (5.3 ft)	59 kg (130 lb)	13 January 2000	(South Korea) Phoenix
31	G	Shin So-jung	1.65 m (5.4 ft)	63 kg (139 lb)	4 March 1990	(South Korea) Ice Beat
32	D	Jin Ok	1.58 m (5.2 ft)	56 kg (123 lb)	28 January 1990	(North Korea) Kanggye
33	F	Choe Un-gyong	1.52 m (5.0 ft)	52 kg (115 lb)	29 January 1994	(North Korea) Susan
37	F	Randi Griffin	1.65 m (5.4 ft)	58 kg (128 lb)	2 September 1988	(South Korea) Phoenix
39	F	Hwang Chung-gum	1.63 m (5.3 ft)	59 kg (130 lb)	11 September 1995	(North Korea) Taesongsan
41	D	Hwang Sol-gyong	1.60 m (5.2 ft)	60 kg (130 lb)	9 January 1997	(North Korea) Jangjasan
42	D	Ryu Su-jong	1.60 m (5.2 ft)	59 kg (130 lb)	24 July 1995	(North Korea) Kimchaek
47	D	Choe Jong-hui	1.58 m (5.2 ft)	62 kg (137 lb)	12 December 1991	(North Korea) Kimchaek

=== Sweden ===
The following is the Swedish roster for the women's ice hockey tournament at the 2018 Winter Olympics.

Head coach: (Sweden) Leif Boork Assistant coaches: (Canada) Alexandra Cipparone, (Canada) Jared Cipparone

No.	Pos.	Name	Height	Weight	Birthdate	Birthplace	2017–18 team
1	G	Sara Grahn	1.70 m (5 ft 7 in)	70 kg (150 lb)	25 September 1988	Örebro	(Sweden) Brynäs IF (SWHL)
2	D	Emmy Alasalmi	1.61 m (5 ft 3 in)	65 kg (143 lb)	17 January 1994	Stockholm	(Sweden) AIK IF (SWHL)
5	D	Johanna Fällman	1.73 m (5 ft 8 in)	71 kg (157 lb)	21 June 1990	Luleå	(Sweden) Luleå HF (SWHL)
6	F	Sara Hjalmarsson	1.76 m (5 ft 9 in)	74 kg (163 lb)	8 February 1998	Bankeryd	(Sweden) AIK IF (SWHL)
7	D	Johanna Olofsson	1.69 m (5 ft 7 in)	69 kg (152 lb)	13 July 1991	Storuman	(Sweden) Modo Hockey (SWHL)
8	D	Annie Svedin	1.63 m (5 ft 4 in)	67 kg (148 lb)	12 October 1991	Sundsvall	(Sweden) Modo Hockey (SWHL)
10	D	Emilia Ramboldt – C	1.75 m (5 ft 9 in)	74 kg (163 lb)	31 August 1988	Stockholm	(Sweden) Linköpings HC (SWHL)
12	D	Maja Nylén Persson	1.64 m (5 ft 5 in)	65 kg (143 lb)	20 November 2000	Avesta	(Sweden) Leksands IF (SWHL)
13	D	Elin Lundberg	1.63 m (5 ft 4 in)	69 kg (152 lb)	15 May 1993	Karlstad	(Sweden) Leksands IF (SWHL)
14	F	Sabina Küller	1.75 m (5 ft 9 in)	73 kg (161 lb)	22 September 1994	Norrtälje	(Sweden) AIK IF (SWHL)
15	F	Lisa Johansson	1.61 m (5 ft 3 in)	58 kg (128 lb)	11 April 1992	Nybro	(Sweden) AIK IF (SWHL)
16	F	Pernilla Winberg – A	1.65 m (5 ft 5 in)	64 kg (141 lb)	24 February 1989	Limhamn	(Sweden) Linköpings HC (SWHL)
18	F	Anna Borgqvist – A	1.63 m (5 ft 4 in)	63 kg (139 lb)	11 June 1992	Växjö	(Sweden) Brynäs IF (SWHL)
19	F	Maria Lindh	1.73 m (5 ft 8 in)	63 kg (139 lb)	29 September 1993	Stockholm	(Sweden) Djurgårdens IF (SWHL)
20	F	Fanny Rask	1.68 m (5 ft 6 in)	65 kg (143 lb)	21 May 1991	Leksand	(Sweden) HV 71 (SWHL)
21	F	Erica Udén Johansson	1.71 m (5 ft 7 in)	70 kg (150 lb)	20 July 1989	Sundsvall	(Sweden) Brynäs IF (SWHL)
23	F	Rebecca Stenberg	1.65 m (5 ft 5 in)	60 kg (130 lb)	18 September 1992	Piteå	(Sweden) Luleå HF (SWHL)
24	F	Erika Grahm	1.75 m (5 ft 9 in)	77 kg (170 lb)	26 January 1991	Kramfors	(Sweden) Modo Hockey (SWHL)
26	F	Hanna Olsson	1.72 m (5 ft 8 in)	68 kg (150 lb)	20 January 1999	Hälsö	(Sweden) Djurgårdens IF (SWHL)
27	F	Emma Nordin	1.68 m (5 ft 6 in)	72 kg (159 lb)	22 March 1991	Örnsköldsvik	(Sweden) Luleå HF (SWHL)
29	F	Olivia Carlsson	1.74 m (5 ft 9 in)	71 kg (157 lb)	2 March 1995	Karlstad	(Sweden) Modo Hockey (SWHL)
30	G	Minatsu Murase	1.68 m (5 ft 6 in)	62 kg (137 lb)	23 June 1995	Stockholm	(Sweden) AIK IF (SWHL)
35	G	Sarah Berglind	1.63 m (5 ft 4 in)	63 kg (139 lb)	10 February 1996	Östersund	(Sweden) Modo Hockey (SWHL)

=== Switzerland ===
The following is the Swiss roster for the women's ice hockey tournament at the 2018 Winter Olympics.

Head coach: (Switzerland) Daniela Diaz Assistant coaches: (Switzerland) Angela Frautschi, (Switzerland) Steve Huard

No.	Pos.	Name	Height	Weight	Birthdate	Birthplace	2017–18 team
1	G	Janine Alder	1.65 m (5 ft 5 in)	55 kg (121 lb)	5 July 1995	Urnäsch	(United States) St. Cloud State Huskies (WCHA)
3	F	Sarah Forster	1.69 m (5 ft 7 in)	64 kg (141 lb)	19 May 1993	Berneck	(Switzerland) EV Bomo Thun (SWHL A)
7	F	Lara Stalder – A	1.67 m (5 ft 6 in)	65 kg (143 lb)	15 May 1994	Lucerne	(Sweden) Linköpings HC (SWHL)
8	D	Nicole Gass	1.72 m (5 ft 8 in)	70 kg (150 lb)	18 August 1993	Zürich	(Switzerland) ZSC Lions (SWHL A)
9	D	Shannon Sigrist	1.69 m (5 ft 7 in)	64 kg (141 lb)	20 April 1999	Hombrechtikon	(Switzerland) ZSC Lions (SWHL A)
11	D	Sabrina Zollinger	1.65 m (5 ft 5 in)	63 kg (139 lb)	27 March 1993	Zürich	(Sweden) HV71 (SWHL)
12	F	Lisa Rüedi	1.67 m (5 ft 6 in)	66 kg (146 lb)	3 November 2000	Thusis	(Switzerland) GCK Lions (SWHL B)
13	F	Sara Benz	1.65 m (5 ft 5 in)	58 kg (128 lb)	25 August 1992	Zürich	(Switzerland) ZSC Lions (SWHL A)
14	F	Evelina Raselli – A	1.69 m (5 ft 7 in)	63 kg (139 lb)	3 May 1992	Poschiavo	(Switzerland) HC Lugano (SWHL A)
15	F	Monika Waidacher	1.73 m (5 ft 8 in)	68 kg (150 lb)	9 July 1990	Zürich	(Switzerland) ZSC Lions (SWHL A)
16	F	Nina Waidacher	1.69 m (5 ft 7 in)	61 kg (134 lb)	23 August 1995	Arosa	(Switzerland) ZSC Lions (SWHL A)
18	F	Tess Allemann	1.68 m (5 ft 6 in)	63 kg (139 lb)	7 April 1998	Farnern	(Switzerland) EV Bomo Thun (SWHL A)
19	D	Christine Meier	1.69 m (5 ft 7 in)	69 kg (152 lb)	12 February 1986	Zürich	(Switzerland) ZSC Lions (SWHL A)
21	D	Laura Benz	1.72 m (5 ft 8 in)	63 kg (139 lb)	25 August 1992	Zürich	(Switzerland) ZSC Lions (SWHL A)
22	D	Livia Altmann – C	1.65 m (5 ft 5 in)	65 kg (143 lb)	13 December 1994	Chur	(United States) Colgate Raiders (ECAC)
23	D	Nicole Bullo	1.60 m (5 ft 3 in)	54 kg (119 lb)	18 July 1987	Bellinzona	(Switzerland) HC Lugano (SWHL A)
24	F	Isabel Waidacher	1.62 m (5 ft 4 in)	56 kg (123 lb)	25 July 1994	Arosa	(Switzerland) ZSC Lions (SWHL A)
25	F	Alina Müller	1.67 m (5 ft 6 in)	62 kg (137 lb)	12 March 1998	Lengnau	(Switzerland) ZSC Lions (NL)
26	F	Dominique Rüegg	1.72 m (5 ft 8 in)	70 kg (150 lb)	5 February 1996	St. Gallenkappel	(Switzerland) ZSC Lions (SWHL A)
27	D	Stefanie Wetli	1.73 m (5 ft 8 in)	57 kg (126 lb)	4 February 2000	Winterthur	(Switzerland) EHC Winterthur
31	G	Andrea Brändli	1.69 m (5 ft 7 in)	70 kg (150 lb)	5 June 1997	Wald	(Switzerland) EHC Schaffhausen (SWHL C)
41	G	Florence Schelling	1.75 m (5 ft 9 in)	65 kg (143 lb)	9 March 1989	Zürich	(Sweden) Linköpings HC (SWHL)
88	F	Phoebe Stänz	1.63 m (5 ft 4 in)	62 kg (137 lb)	7 January 1994	Zetzwil	(Sweden) SDE Hockey (SWHL)
