= Korea at the 2018 Winter Olympics =

- Korean Unification Flag
- IOC code: COR

in Pyeongchang, South Korea 9–25 February 2018
- Competitors: 35 in 1 sport
- Flag bearers: Opening; Won Yun-jong (South Korea); Hwang Chung-gum (North Korea); Closing; Lee Seung-hoon (South Korea); Kim Ju-sik (North Korea)
- Medals: Gold 0 Silver 0 Bronze 0 Total 0

Winter Olympics appearances (overview)
- 2018

Other related appearances
- South Korea (1948–pres.); North Korea (1964–pres.)

A unified team of South Korea and North Korea competed under the title "Korea" at the 2018 Winter Olympics in ice hockey.

At the 2018 Winter Olympics, the delegations from both the host nation South Korea and North Korea marched together in the opening ceremony under the Korean Unification Flag.

== Background ==
In January 2018, it was announced that the South Korea women's national ice hockey team would be amalgamated with a group of North Korean players to form a single Korea women's national ice hockey team in the tournament. They competed under the country code "COR", from the abbreviation of French word Corée. (The country code "KOR" is already used for South Korea; the IOC uses "PRK" for North Korea.) The anthem which played when the Korea team played in international ice hockey is the folk song "Arirang" instead of the national anthems of either South Korea or North Korea. The team's uniform featured the silhouette of the Korean peninsula with the text "Korea". Because of ongoing U.S. sanctions against North Korea, the uniforms were made by a Finnish company instead of official sponsor Nike.

The first match of the unified Korean women's ice hockey team was attended by various dignitaries, including International Olympic Committee President Thomas Bach, South Korean President Moon Jae-in, North Korean President of the Presidium of the Supreme People's Assembly Kim Yong-nam and North Korean Director of the Propaganda and Agitation Department of the Workers' Party of Korea Kim Yo-jong.

== Competitors ==
The following is the list of number of competitors who participated in the unified Korean team.

Sport	Men	Women	Total
Ice hockey	0	South Korea: 23; North Korea: 12	35
Total	0	35	35

== Ice hockey ==
Summary

Key:

- OT – Overtime
- GWS – Match decided by penalty-shootout

Team	Event	Group Stage				Quarterfinal	Semifinal / Pl.	Final / BM / Pl.	
Team	Event	Opposition Score	Opposition Score	Opposition Score	Rank	Opposition Score	Opposition Score	Opposition Score	Rank
Korea women's	Women's tournament	Switzerland; L 0–8	Sweden; L 0–8	Japan; L 1–4	4	—N/a	Switzerland; L 0–2	Sweden; L 1–6	8

=== Women's tournament ===
South Korea qualified as the host. From a roster of 35 players, at minimum of three North Korean players were selected for each game.

==== Team roster ====
- Women's team event – 1 team of 35 players

The following is the Korean roster for the women's ice hockey tournament at the 2018 Winter Olympics.

Head coach: (Canada) Sarah Murray Assistant coaches: (South Korea) Kim Do-yun, (North Korea) Pak Chol-ho, (United States) Rebecca Baker

No.	Pos.	Name	Height	Weight	Birthdate	2017–18 team
1	G	Genny Kim Knowles	1.60 m (5.2 ft)	60 kg (130 lb)	25 April 2000	(South Korea) Phoenix
2	F	Ko Hye-in	1.63 m (5.3 ft)	68 kg (150 lb)	18 July 1994	(South Korea) Ice Avengers
3	D	Eom Su-yeon	1.68 m (5.5 ft)	60 kg (130 lb)	1 February 2001	(South Korea) Ice Avengers
4	F	Kim Un-hyang	1.57 m (5.2 ft)	59 kg (130 lb)	10 December 1992	(North Korea) Kanggye
5	F	Caroline Park	1.59 m (5.2 ft)	56 kg (123 lb)	18 November 1989	(South Korea) Phoenix
6	F	Choi Yu-jung	1.56 m (5.1 ft)	56 kg (123 lb)	27 March 2000	(South Korea) Ice Beat
7	F	Danelle Im	1.62 m (5.3 ft)	55 kg (121 lb)	21 January 1993	(South Korea) Phoenix
8	D	Kim Se-lin	1.56 m (5.1 ft)	60 kg (130 lb)	3 April 2000	(South Korea) Ice Avengers
9	F	Park Jong-ah – C	1.60 m (5.2 ft)	59 kg (130 lb)	13 June 1996	(South Korea) Ice Avengers
10	F	Choi Ji-yeon	1.59 m (5.2 ft)	52 kg (115 lb)	21 August 1998	(South Korea) Ice Avengers
11	D	Park Ye-eun	1.62 m (5.3 ft)	54 kg (119 lb)	28 May 1996	(South Korea) Ice Beat
12	F	Kim Hee-won	1.64 m (5.4 ft)	55 kg (121 lb)	1 August 2001	(South Korea) Ice Avengers
13	F	Lee Eun-ji	1.54 m (5.1 ft)	48 kg (106 lb)	8 March 2001	(South Korea) Phoenix
14	F	Ryo Song-hui	1.57 m (5.2 ft)	61 kg (134 lb)	15 January 1994	(North Korea) Taesongsan
15	D	Park Chae-lin	1.58 m (5.2 ft)	52 kg (115 lb)	17 December 1998	(South Korea) Ice Beat
16	F	Jo Su-sie – A	1.62 m (5.3 ft)	55 kg (121 lb)	9 September 1994	(South Korea) Ice Beat
17	F	Han Soo-jin	1.69 m (5.5 ft)	63 kg (139 lb)	22 September 1987	(South Korea) Ice Beat
18	F	Kim Un-jong	1.56 m (5.1 ft)	63 kg (139 lb)	28 October 1992	(North Korea) Taesongsan
20	G	Han Do-hee	1.59 m (5.2 ft)	60 kg (130 lb)	16 November 1994	(South Korea) Ice Avengers
21	F	Lee Yeon-jeong	1.60 m (5.2 ft)	52 kg (115 lb)	2 November 1994	(South Korea) Ice Beat
22	F	Jung Si-yun	1.71 m (5.6 ft)	64 kg (141 lb)	8 September 2000	(South Korea) Ice Avengers
23	D	Park Yoon-jung – A	1.71 m (5.6 ft)	65 kg (143 lb)	18 December 1992	(South Korea) Phoenix
24	D	Cho Mi-hwan	1.60 m (5.2 ft)	58 kg (128 lb)	30 March 1995	(South Korea) Ice Avengers
25	G	Ri Pom	1.63 m (5.3 ft)	62 kg (137 lb)	28 May 1995	(North Korea) Sajabong
26	F	Kim Hyang-mi	1.62 m (5.3 ft)	72 kg (159 lb)	10 February 1995	(North Korea) Taesongsan
27	F	Jong Su-hyon	1.60 m (5.2 ft)	58 kg (128 lb)	10 October 1996	(North Korea) Taesongsan
29	F	Lee Jin-gyu	1.63 m (5.3 ft)	59 kg (130 lb)	13 January 2000	(South Korea) Phoenix
31	G	Shin So-jung	1.65 m (5.4 ft)	63 kg (139 lb)	4 March 1990	(South Korea) Ice Beat
32	D	Jin Ok	1.58 m (5.2 ft)	56 kg (123 lb)	28 January 1990	(North Korea) Kanggye
33	F	Choe Un-gyong	1.52 m (5.0 ft)	52 kg (115 lb)	29 January 1994	(North Korea) Susan
37	F	Randi Griffin	1.65 m (5.4 ft)	58 kg (128 lb)	2 September 1988	(South Korea) Phoenix
39	F	Hwang Chung-gum	1.63 m (5.3 ft)	59 kg (130 lb)	11 September 1995	(North Korea) Taesongsan
41	D	Hwang Sol-gyong	1.60 m (5.2 ft)	60 kg (130 lb)	9 January 1997	(North Korea) Jangjasan
42	D	Ryu Su-jong	1.60 m (5.2 ft)	59 kg (130 lb)	24 July 1995	(North Korea) Kimchaek
47	D	Choe Jong-hui	1.58 m (5.2 ft)	62 kg (137 lb)	12 December 1991	(North Korea) Kimchaek

==== Preliminary round ====
Pos	Team	Pld	W	OTW	OTL	L	GF	GA	GD	Pts	Qualification
1	Switzerland	3	3	0	0	0	13	2	+11	9	Quarterfinals
2	Sweden	3	2	0	0	1	11	3	+8	6	Quarterfinals
3	Japan	3	1	0	0	2	6	6	0	3	Classification
4	Korea (H)	3	0	0	0	3	1	20	−19	0	Classification

Source: IIHF
(H) Host

10 February 2018; 21:10	Switzerland	8–0 (3–0, 3–0, 2–0)	Korea	Kwandong Hockey Centre, Gangneung; Attendance: 3,606

Game reference

Florence Schelling
Goalies
Shin So-jung
Referees:
(United States) Dina Allen
(Canada) Gabrielle Ariano-Lortie
Linesmen:
(United States) Jessica Leclerc
(Canada) Justine Todd

Müller (S. Benz) (SH) – 10:23	1–0
Müller (S. Benz, Stalder) – 11:24	2–0
Müller (S. Benz, Meier) – 19:49	3–0
Müller – 21:26	4–0
Stänz (Raselli) – 22:21	5–0
Stänz (Raselli) – 37:19	6–0
Stalder (Meier, Müller) (PP) – 49:42	7–0
Stalder (Müller) – 51:48	8–0

12 min
Penalties
6 min
52
Shots
8

12 February 2018; 21:10	Sweden	8–0 (4–0, 1–0, 3–0)	Korea	Kwandong Hockey Centre, Gangneung; Attendance: 4,244

Game reference

Sara Grahn
Goalies
Shin So-jung
Referees:
(Canada) Gabrielle Ariano-Lortie
(Switzerland) Drahomira Fialova
Linesmen:
(Finland) Johanna Tauriainen
(United States) Jessica Leclerc

Nylén Persson (Alasalmi) (PP) – 04:00	1–0
Lundberg (Rask, Grahm) – 09:47	2–0
Fällman (Rask, Küller) – 10:17	3–0
Udén Johansson (Johansson) – 17:04	4–0
Winberg (Lundberg, Alasalmi) – 24:08	5-0
Nordin (Winberg) – 41:09	6–0
Winberg (Grahm, Nordin) – 41:45	7–0
Stenberg (Winberg) – 45:34	8–0

8 min
Penalties
6 min
50
Shots
19

14 February 2018; 16:40	Korea	1–4 (0–2, 1–0, 0–2)	Japan	Kwandong Hockey Centre, Gangneung; Attendance: 4,110

Game reference

Shin So-jung
Goalies
Akane Konishi
Referees:
(Switzerland) Drahomira Fialova
(Germany) Nicole Hertrich
Linesmen:
(United States) Jessica Leclerc
(Czech Republic) Zuzana Svobodová

	0–1	01:07 – Kubo (H. Toko, Ukita)
	0–2	03:58 – Ono (Koike, Yoneyama) (PP)
Griffin (Park Yo.) – 29:31	1–2
	1–3	51:42 – Koike (Hosoyamada, Yoneyama) (PP)
	1–4	58:33 – Ukita (ENG)

6 min
Penalties
4 min
13
Shots
44

5–8th place semifinal

18 February 2018; 12:10	Switzerland	2–0 (1–0, 1–0, 0–0)	Korea	Kwandong Hockey Centre, Gangneung; Attendance: 3,811

Game reference
Janine Alder	Goalies	Shin So-jung	Referees: (Canada) Gabrielle Ariano-Lortie (Sweden) Katarina Timglas; Linesmen: (Finland) Jenni Heikkinen (Sweden) Veronica Johansson
Zollinger (Bullo, L. Benz) (PP) – 16:35 / 1–0; Raselli (Rüegg, Altmann) – 38:52 / 2–0			Referees: (Canada) Gabrielle Ariano-Lortie (Sweden) Katarina Timglas; Linesmen: (Finland) Jenni Heikkinen (Sweden) Veronica Johansson
2 min	Penalties	8 min	Referees: (Canada) Gabrielle Ariano-Lortie (Sweden) Katarina Timglas; Linesmen: (Finland) Jenni Heikkinen (Sweden) Veronica Johansson
53	Shots	19	Referees: (Canada) Gabrielle Ariano-Lortie (Sweden) Katarina Timglas; Linesmen: (Finland) Jenni Heikkinen (Sweden) Veronica Johansson

Seventh place game

20 February 2018; 12:10	Sweden	6–1 (2–1, 1–0, 3–0)	Korea	Kwandong Hockey Centre, Gangneung; Attendance: 4,125

Game reference

Minatsu Murase
Sarah Berglind
Goalies
Shin So-jung
Han Do-hee
Referees:
(Switzerland) Drahomira Fialova
(Norway) Aina Hove
Linesmen:
(Finland) Jenni Heikkinen
(Slovenia) Nataša Pagon

Küller (Rask, Udén Johansson) – 05:50	1–0
	1–1	06:21 – Han S. (Park J.) (PP)
Alasalmi (Nylén Persson, Borgqvist) (PP) – 19:37	2–1
Grahm (Rask, Nordin) – 36:27	3–1
Svedin (Johansson, Hjalmarsson) – 43:05	4–1
Rask (Lindh) – 49:31	5–1
Johansson (Borgqvist, Hjalmarsson) – 57:19	6–1

6 min
Penalties
4 min
40
Shots
16

== See also ==
- Korea Team
- North Korea at the 2018 Winter Olympics
- South Korea at the 2018 Winter Olympics
