= Korea women's national ice hockey team =

North-South Korean ice hockey team

Korea
- General manager: Lee Ji-yoon
- Head coach: Sarah Murray (2018)
- Assistants: Rebecca Baker; Kim Do-yun; Pak Chol-ho (2018)
- Captain: Park Jong-ah (2018)
- Team colors

First international
- Sweden 3–1 Korea (Incheon, South Korea; 5 February 2018)

Biggest win
- None

Biggest defeat
- Switzerland 8–0 Korea (Gangneung, South Korea; 10 February 2018); Sweden 8–0 Korea (Gangneung, South Korea; 12 February 2018)

Olympics
- Appearances: 1 (first in 2018)

International record (W–L–T)
- 0–5–0

The Korea women's national ice hockey team is a representative side which is composed of players from both South Korea and North Korea.

The team competed at the 2018 Winter Olympics, competing as "Korea" under the IOC country code "COR".

== History ==
In 2014, it was confirmed that Korea women's national ice hockey team had qualified to participate at the 2018 Winter Olympics as part of the host country. Their participation at the 2018 Winter Olympics had been their second appearance following their debut in the 1998 Olympics in Nagano, Japan.

South Korea had proposed a unified team of the two Koreas at the Games. It was proposed that the team would participate at least in the women's ice hockey event and possibly more disciplines. The proposal came after North Korea competed in the Group A tournament of IIHF Women's World Championship Division II which was hosted in South Korea in April 2017. North Korea initially refused the proposal in June 2017 on the grounds of time constraints. However, an agreement was made with four weeks left before the Games commenced.

On 20 January 2018, the International Olympic Committee allowed a Unified Korean team to compete in the women's ice hockey event for the 2018 Winter Olympics under the "Olympic Korean Peninsula Declaration", allowing the team to compete as "Korea", using the acronym "COR". On 30 January 2018, the full roster of the unified Korean team was named.

The language difference of Korean spoken by players from South and North Korea became a challenge for the team during training. South and North Korea use different terminology in ice hockey and head coach Sarah Murray does not speak Korean and had to rely on her assistant and manager to communicate with the team's players.

The unified team played their first friendly match against Sweden on 4 February 2018 at the Seonhak International Ice Rink in Incheon before an audience of 3,000 people ahead of the Winter Olympics. They lost 1–3 to their European opposition. The Koreans scored their only goal during the first period. Four of the 22 players in the roster for that game were North Koreans.

== Team image ==
The Korean Unification Flag was used by the team.

The anthem which plays when the Korea team plays in international ice hockey is the folk song "Arirang" instead of the national anthems of either South Korea or North Korea. The team's uniform features the silhouette of the Korean peninsula with the text "Korea".

There was some opposition to the formation of the team. Critics of the unified team believed that the team had less chance to win a medal compared to a team solely composed of South Koreans.

== Olympic Games record ==
- 2018 – Finished in 8th place

== Fixtures and results ==
=== Exhibition games ===
4 February 2018	Korea	1–3 (1–3, 0–0, 0–0)	Sweden	Seonhak International Ice Rink, Incheon; Attendance: 3,000

Game reference

Shin So-jung
Goalies

	0–1	16:15 – Stenberg
	0–2	? – Olsson
Park Jong-ah – 18:22	1–2
	1–3	19:40 – Grahm

=== 2018 Winter Olympics ===
Pos	Team	Pld	W	OTW	OTL	L	GF	GA	GD	Pts	Qualification
1	Switzerland	3	3	0	0	0	13	2	+11	9	Quarterfinals
2	Sweden	3	2	0	0	1	11	3	+8	6	Quarterfinals
3	Japan	3	1	0	0	2	6	6	0	3	Classification
4	Korea (H)	3	0	0	0	3	1	20	−19	0	Classification

Source: IIHF
(H) Host

10 February 2018; 21:10	Switzerland	8–0 (3–0, 3–0, 2–0)	Korea	Kwandong Hockey Centre, Gangneung; Attendance: 3,606

Game reference

Florence Schelling
Goalies
Shin So-jung
Referees:
(United States) Dina Allen
(Canada) Gabrielle Ariano-Lortie
Linesmen:
(United States) Jessica Leclerc
(Canada) Justine Todd

Müller (S. Benz) (SH) – 10:23	1–0
Müller (S. Benz, Stalder) – 11:24	2–0
Müller (S. Benz, Meier) – 19:49	3–0
Müller – 21:26	4–0
Stänz (Raselli) – 22:21	5–0
Stänz (Raselli) – 37:19	6–0
Stalder (Meier, Müller) (PP) – 49:42	7–0
Stalder (Müller) – 51:48	8–0

12 min
Penalties
6 min
52
Shots
8

12 February 2018; 21:10	Sweden	8–0 (4–0, 1–0, 3–0)	Korea	Kwandong Hockey Centre, Gangneung; Attendance: 4,244

Game reference

Sara Grahn
Goalies
Shin So-jung
Referees:
(Canada) Gabrielle Ariano-Lortie
(Switzerland) Drahomira Fialova
Linesmen:
(Finland) Johanna Tauriainen
(United States) Jessica Leclerc

Nylén Persson (Alasalmi) (PP) – 04:00	1–0
Lundberg (Rask, Grahm) – 09:47	2–0
Fällman (Rask, Küller) – 10:17	3–0
Udén Johansson (Johansson) – 17:04	4–0
Winberg (Lundberg, Alasalmi) – 24:08	5-0
Nordin (Winberg) – 41:09	6–0
Winberg (Grahm, Nordin) – 41:45	7–0
Stenberg (Winberg) – 45:34	8–0

8 min
Penalties
6 min
50
Shots
19

14 February 2018; 16:40	Korea	1–4 (0–2, 1–0, 0–2)	Japan	Kwandong Hockey Centre, Gangneung; Attendance: 4,110

Game reference

Shin So-jung
Goalies
Akane Konishi
Referees:
(Switzerland) Drahomira Fialova
(Germany) Nicole Hertrich
Linesmen:
(United States) Jessica Leclerc
(Czech Republic) Zuzana Svobodová

	0–1	01:07 – Kubo (H. Toko, Ukita)
	0–2	03:58 – Ono (Koike, Yoneyama) (PP)
Griffin (Park Yo.) – 29:31	1–2
	1–3	51:42 – Koike (Hosoyamada, Yoneyama) (PP)
	1–4	58:33 – Ukita (ENG)

6 min
Penalties
4 min
13
Shots
44

5–8th place semifinal

18 February 2018; 12:10	Switzerland	2–0 (1–0, 1–0, 0–0)	Korea	Kwandong Hockey Centre, Gangneung; Attendance: 3,811

Game reference
Janine Alder	Goalies	Shin So-jung	Referees: (Canada) Gabrielle Ariano-Lortie (Sweden) Katarina Timglas; Linesmen: (Finland) Jenni Heikkinen (Sweden) Veronica Johansson
Zollinger (Bullo, L. Benz) (PP) – 16:35 / 1–0; Raselli (Rüegg, Altmann) – 38:52 / 2–0			Referees: (Canada) Gabrielle Ariano-Lortie (Sweden) Katarina Timglas; Linesmen: (Finland) Jenni Heikkinen (Sweden) Veronica Johansson
2 min	Penalties	8 min	Referees: (Canada) Gabrielle Ariano-Lortie (Sweden) Katarina Timglas; Linesmen: (Finland) Jenni Heikkinen (Sweden) Veronica Johansson
53	Shots	19	Referees: (Canada) Gabrielle Ariano-Lortie (Sweden) Katarina Timglas; Linesmen: (Finland) Jenni Heikkinen (Sweden) Veronica Johansson

Seventh place game

20 February 2018; 12:10	Sweden	6–1 (2–1, 1–0, 3–0)	Korea	Kwandong Hockey Centre, Gangneung; Attendance: 4,125

Game reference

Minatsu Murase
Sarah Berglind
Goalies
Shin So-jung
Han Do-hee
Referees:
(Switzerland) Drahomira Fialova
(Norway) Aina Hove
Linesmen:
(Finland) Jenni Heikkinen
(Slovenia) Nataša Pagon

Küller (Rask, Udén Johansson) – 05:50	1–0
	1–1	06:21 – Han S. (Park J.) (PP)
Alasalmi (Nylén Persson, Borgqvist) (PP) – 19:37	2–1
Grahm (Rask, Nordin) – 36:27	3–1
Svedin (Johansson, Hjalmarsson) – 43:05	4–1
Rask (Lindh) – 49:31	5–1
Johansson (Borgqvist, Hjalmarsson) – 57:19	6–1

6 min
Penalties
4 min
40
Shots
16

== Team ==
=== 2018 Winter Olympics roster ===
The squad had a total of 35 players, more than other competing national teams at the Games although the IOC has mandated that only 22 players could play in each match "with respect to fair play" and that the coach must select at least three North Koreans to form the squad in each game.

The following is the Korean roster for the women's ice hockey tournament at the 2018 Winter Olympics.

Head coach: (Canada) Sarah Murray Assistant coaches: (South Korea) Kim Do-yun, (North Korea) Pak Chol-ho, (United States) Rebecca Baker

No.	Pos.	Name	Height	Weight	Birthdate	2017–18 team
1	G	Genny Kim Knowles	1.60 m (5.2 ft)	60 kg (130 lb)	25 April 2000	(South Korea) Phoenix
2	F	Ko Hye-in	1.63 m (5.3 ft)	68 kg (150 lb)	18 July 1994	(South Korea) Ice Avengers
3	D	Eom Su-yeon	1.68 m (5.5 ft)	60 kg (130 lb)	1 February 2001	(South Korea) Ice Avengers
4	F	Kim Un-hyang	1.57 m (5.2 ft)	59 kg (130 lb)	10 December 1992	(North Korea) Kanggye
5	F	Caroline Park	1.59 m (5.2 ft)	56 kg (123 lb)	18 November 1989	(South Korea) Phoenix
6	F	Choi Yu-jung	1.56 m (5.1 ft)	56 kg (123 lb)	27 March 2000	(South Korea) Ice Beat
7	F	Danelle Im	1.62 m (5.3 ft)	55 kg (121 lb)	21 January 1993	(South Korea) Phoenix
8	D	Kim Se-lin	1.56 m (5.1 ft)	60 kg (130 lb)	3 April 2000	(South Korea) Ice Avengers
9	F	Park Jong-ah – C	1.60 m (5.2 ft)	59 kg (130 lb)	13 June 1996	(South Korea) Ice Avengers
10	F	Choi Ji-yeon	1.59 m (5.2 ft)	52 kg (115 lb)	21 August 1998	(South Korea) Ice Avengers
11	D	Park Ye-eun	1.62 m (5.3 ft)	54 kg (119 lb)	28 May 1996	(South Korea) Ice Beat
12	F	Kim Hee-won	1.64 m (5.4 ft)	55 kg (121 lb)	1 August 2001	(South Korea) Ice Avengers
13	F	Lee Eun-ji	1.54 m (5.1 ft)	48 kg (106 lb)	8 March 2001	(South Korea) Phoenix
14	F	Ryo Song-hui	1.57 m (5.2 ft)	61 kg (134 lb)	15 January 1994	(North Korea) Taesongsan
15	D	Park Chae-lin	1.58 m (5.2 ft)	52 kg (115 lb)	17 December 1998	(South Korea) Ice Beat
16	F	Jo Su-sie – A	1.62 m (5.3 ft)	55 kg (121 lb)	9 September 1994	(South Korea) Ice Beat
17	F	Han Soo-jin	1.69 m (5.5 ft)	63 kg (139 lb)	22 September 1987	(South Korea) Ice Beat
18	F	Kim Un-jong	1.56 m (5.1 ft)	63 kg (139 lb)	28 October 1992	(North Korea) Taesongsan
20	G	Han Do-hee	1.59 m (5.2 ft)	60 kg (130 lb)	16 November 1994	(South Korea) Ice Avengers
21	F	Lee Yeon-jeong	1.60 m (5.2 ft)	52 kg (115 lb)	2 November 1994	(South Korea) Ice Beat
22	F	Jung Si-yun	1.71 m (5.6 ft)	64 kg (141 lb)	8 September 2000	(South Korea) Ice Avengers
23	D	Park Yoon-jung – A	1.71 m (5.6 ft)	65 kg (143 lb)	18 December 1992	(South Korea) Phoenix
24	D	Cho Mi-hwan	1.60 m (5.2 ft)	58 kg (128 lb)	30 March 1995	(South Korea) Ice Avengers
25	G	Ri Pom	1.63 m (5.3 ft)	62 kg (137 lb)	28 May 1995	(North Korea) Sajabong
26	F	Kim Hyang-mi	1.62 m (5.3 ft)	72 kg (159 lb)	10 February 1995	(North Korea) Taesongsan
27	F	Jong Su-hyon	1.60 m (5.2 ft)	58 kg (128 lb)	10 October 1996	(North Korea) Taesongsan
29	F	Lee Jin-gyu	1.63 m (5.3 ft)	59 kg (130 lb)	13 January 2000	(South Korea) Phoenix
31	G	Shin So-jung	1.65 m (5.4 ft)	63 kg (139 lb)	4 March 1990	(South Korea) Ice Beat
32	D	Jin Ok	1.58 m (5.2 ft)	56 kg (123 lb)	28 January 1990	(North Korea) Kanggye
33	F	Choe Un-gyong	1.52 m (5.0 ft)	52 kg (115 lb)	29 January 1994	(North Korea) Susan
37	F	Randi Griffin	1.65 m (5.4 ft)	58 kg (128 lb)	2 September 1988	(South Korea) Phoenix
39	F	Hwang Chung-gum	1.63 m (5.3 ft)	59 kg (130 lb)	11 September 1995	(North Korea) Taesongsan
41	D	Hwang Sol-gyong	1.60 m (5.2 ft)	60 kg (130 lb)	9 January 1997	(North Korea) Jangjasan
42	D	Ryu Su-jong	1.60 m (5.2 ft)	59 kg (130 lb)	24 July 1995	(North Korea) Kimchaek
47	D	Choe Jong-hui	1.58 m (5.2 ft)	62 kg (137 lb)	12 December 1991	(North Korea) Kimchaek

== All-time record against other nations ==
Last match update: 20 February 2018

Team	GP	W	T	L	GF	GA
Japan	1	0	0	1	1	4
Sweden	3	0	0	3	2	17
Switzerland	2	0	0	2	0	10

== See also ==
- Korea at the 2018 Winter Olympics
- Unified Korean sporting teams
