= Ice hockey at the 2018 Winter Olympics – Women's tournament =

2018 Winter Olympics

Tournament details
- Host country: South Korea
- Venues: 2 (in 1 host city)
- Dates: 10–22 February
- Teams: 8

Final positions
- Champions: United States (2nd title)
- Runners-up: Canada
- Third place: Finland
- Fourth place: Olympic Athletes from Russia

Tournament statistics
- Games played: 22
- Goals scored: 109 (4.95 per game)
- Attendance: 85,565 (3,889 per game)
- Scoring leader: (Switzerland) Alina Müller (10 points)

Awards
- MVP: (Canada) Mélodie Daoust

The women's tournament in ice hockey at the 2018 Winter Olympics was held in Gangneung, South Korea between 10 and 22 February 2018. Eight countries qualified for the tournament; five of them did so automatically by virtue of their ranking by the International Ice Hockey Federation, one, South Korea, automatically qualified as hosts, while the two others took part in a qualification tournament. Under a special agreement with the IOC and the IIHF, twelve North Korean players joined the host team to form a united team. They were allowed to have an expanded roster of 35 where 22 players dress for each game. Three North Korean players were selected for each game by coach Sarah Murray.

The United States winning the gold medal for second time, marks the first time in 20 years that the United States took home a gold medal in women's hockey. They previously won in 1998 in Nagano, Japan, which was also against Canada. Canada's loss ended their winning streak of four consecutive winter games, having won since 2002.

== Qualification ==
Canada and the United States assured themselves of top four ranking after the 2016 Women's Ice Hockey World Championships by the end of the 2015 Championships and qualified for the A group.

Finland, Russia, and Sweden qualified by their ranking after the 2016 Championships.

South Korea qualified as the host team. The remaining two teams qualified from qualification tournaments.

=== Qualified teams ===
Event	Date	Location	Vacancies	Qualified
Hosts	19 September 2014	(Spain) Tenerife	1	South Korea
2016 IIHF World Ranking	7 December 2012 – 10 April 2016	(Canada) Kamloops	5	United States; Canada; Finland; Russia; Sweden
Final qualification tournament	9–12 February 2017	(Switzerland) Arosa	1	Switzerland
Final qualification tournament	9–12 February 2017	(Japan) Tomakomai	1	Japan
TOTAL			8	

Notes

1. ^{a} A unified Korean team consisting of players from both North Korea and South Korea will compete, after talks in Panmunjom on 17 January 2018.
2. ^{b} The 2016 IIHF World Ranking includes the following events: 2013 World Championship, 2014 Winter Olympic Games, 2014 World Championship, 2015 World Championship and 2016 World Championship
3. ^{c} Kamloops was the site for 2016 IIHF Women's World Championship; at the conclusion of the tournament the ranking was finalized with regard to the qualification slots.
4. ^{d} In December 2017, the IOC suspended Russia from competing at the Winter Olympics as part of its sanctions following state-sponsored doping scandal. Russian athletes deemed clean were permitted to compete as Olympic Athletes from Russia.

== Format ==
The top four teams based on the 2016 IIHF World Ranking, the United States, Canada, Finland and Olympic Athletes from Russia, compete in Group A, while the remaining four teams compete in Group B. The top two teams in Group A received a bye to the semifinals. In the quarterfinals, the third placed team in Group A played the second place team in Group B, while the fourth placed team in Group A played the first place team in Group B. The winners advanced to the semifinals, while the two losers, and the third and fourth placed teams in Group B, competed in a classification bracket for places five through eight.

== Match officials ==
10 referees and 9 linesmen were selected for the tournament.

Referees

- (Canada) Gabrielle Ariano-Lortie
- (Germany) Nicole Hertrich
- (Norway) Aina Hove
- (Switzerland) Drahomira Fialova
- (Slovakia) Nikoleta Celárová
- (Sweden) Gabriella Gran
- (Sweden) Katarina Timglas
- (United States) Dina Allen
- (United States) Katie Guay
- (United States) Melissa Szkola

Linesmen

- (Canada) Justine Todd
- (Czech Republic) Zuzana Svobodová
- (Finland) Jenni Heikkinen
- (Finland) Johanna Tauriainen
- (France) Charlotte Girard-Fabre
- (Germany) Lisa Linnek
- (Slovenia) Nataša Pagon
- (Sweden) Veronica Johansson
- (United States) Jessica Leclerc

== Preliminary round ==
All times are local (UTC+9).

=== Group A ===
Pos	Team	Pld	W	OTW	OTL	L	GF	GA	GD	Pts	Qualification
1	Canada	3	3	0	0	0	11	2	+9	9	Semifinals
2	United States	3	2	0	0	1	9	3	+6	6	Semifinals
3	Finland	3	1	0	0	2	7	8	−1	3	Quarterfinals
4	Olympic Athletes from Russia	3	0	0	0	3	1	15	−14	0	Quarterfinals

Source: IIHF

11 February 2018; 16:40	Finland	1–3 (1–0, 0–2, 0–1)	United States	Kwandong Hockey Centre, Gangneung; Attendance: 4,032

Game reference

Noora Räty
Goalies
Maddie Rooney
Referees:
(Germany) Nicole Hertrich
(Norway) Aina Hove
Linesmen:
(France) Charlotte Girard-Fabre
(Sweden) Veronica Johansson

Hovi (Nieminen, Välimäki) – 19:54	1–0
	1–1	28:58 – Lamoureux-Morando
	1–2	31:29 – Coyne (Knight, Decker)
	1–3	59:47 – Cameranesi (Keller) (ENG)

8 min
Penalties
4 min
24
Shots
42

11 February 2018; 21:10	Canada	5–0 (0–0, 3–0, 2–0)	Olympic Athletes from Russia	Kwandong Hockey Centre, Gangneung; Attendance: 3,912

Game reference

Ann-Renée Desbiens
Goalies
Nadezhda Morozova
Nadezhda Aleksandrova
Referees:
(Slovakia) Nikoleta Celárová
(Sweden) Katarina Timglas
Linesmen:
(Finland) Jenni Heikkinen
(Germany) Lisa Linnek

Johnston (Jenner, Saulnier) – 21:55	1–0
Irwin (Johnston) (PP) – 24:13	2–0
Daoust (Agosta, Poulin) – 35:58	3–0
Johnston (Lacquette, Poulin) (PP2) – 48:41	4–0
Daoust (Poulin) – 50:44	5–0

4 min
Penalties
14 min
48
Shots
18

13 February 2018; 16:40	Canada	4–1 (2–0, 2–0, 0–1)	Finland	Kwandong Hockey Centre, Gangneung; Attendance: 3,879

Game reference

Shannon Szabados
Goalies
Noora Räty
Referees:
(United States) Dina Allena
(United States) Melissa Szkola
Linesmen:
(Sweden) Veronica Johansson
(United States) Jessica Leclerc

Agosta (Daoust) – 00:35	1–0
Poulin – 17:11	2–0
Daoust (Fortino, Agosta) – 28:19	3–0
Saulnier (Johnston) – 38:26	4–0
	4–1	47:17 – Välilä (Tapani, Karvinen)

8 min
Penalties
10 min
32
Shots
23

13 February 2018; 21:10	United States	5–0 (1–0, 3–0, 1–0)	Olympic Athletes from Russia	Kwandong Hockey Centre, Gangneung; Attendance: 3,797

Game reference

Nicole Hensley
Goalies
Valeria Tarakanova
Nadezhda Morozova
Referees:
(Canada) Gabrielle Ariano-Lortie
(Sweden) Gabriella Gran
Linesmen:
(Czech Republic) Zuzana Svobodová
(Finland) Johanna Tauriainen

Bellamy (Lamoureux-Davidson, Marvin) – 08:02	1–0
Lamoureux-Davidson (Lamoureux-Morando) – 31:46	2–0
Lamoureux-Davidson – 31:52	3–0
Marvin (Pelkey, Duggan) – 34:38	4–0
Brandt (Cameranesi, Keller) – 58:23	5–0

2 min
Penalties
6 min
50
Shots
13

15 February 2018; 12:10	United States	1–2 (0–0, 0–2, 1–0)	Canada	Kwandong Hockey Centre, Gangneung; Attendance: 3,885

Game reference

Maddie Rooney
Goalies
Geneviève Lacasse
Referees:
(Norway) Aina Hove
(Sweden) Katarina Timglas
Linesmen:
(Finland) Jenni Heikkinen
(Sweden) Veronica Johansson

	0–1	27:18 – Agosta (Spooner, Jenner) (PP)
	0–2	34:56 – Nurse (Larocque)
Coyne (Decker) – 40:23	1–2

12 min
Penalties
8 min
45
Shots
23

15 February 2018; 16:40	Olympic Athletes from Russia	1–5 (0–1, 0–2, 1–2)	Finland	Kwandong Hockey Centre, Gangneung; Attendance: 3,353

Game reference

Nadezhda Morozova
Goalies
Noora Räty
Referees:
(Germany) Nicole Hertrich
(United States) Melissa Szkola
Linesmen:
(Germany) Lisa Linnek
(Canada) Justine Todd

	0–1	17:47 – Karvinen (Hiirikoski) (PP)
	0–2	20:20 – Karvinen (Nuutinen, Välilä)
	0–3	39:08 – Välilä
Shokhina (Belyakova) – 44:50	1–3
	1–4	52:49 – Tuominen (Hiirikoski, Nieminen) (PP)
	1–5	55:33 – Nieminen

8 min
Penalties
4 min
25
Shots
37

=== Group B ===
Pos	Team	Pld	W	OTW	OTL	L	GF	GA	GD	Pts	Qualification
1	Switzerland	3	3	0	0	0	13	2	+11	9	Quarterfinals
2	Sweden	3	2	0	0	1	11	3	+8	6	Quarterfinals
3	Japan	3	1	0	0	2	6	6	0	3	Classification
4	Korea (H)	3	0	0	0	3	1	20	−19	0	Classification

Source: IIHF
(H) Host

10 February 2018; 16:40	Japan	1–2 (0–1, 1–0, 0–1)	Sweden	Kwandong Hockey Centre, Gangneung; Attendance: 3,762

Game reference

Nana Fujimoto
Goalies
Sara Grahn
Referees:
(United States) Katie Guay
(United States) Melissa Szkola
Linesmen:
(Slovenia) Nataša Pagon
(Czech Republic) Zuzana Svobodová

	0–1	02:21 – Rask (Küller, Carlsson)
Ukita (Kubo) – 36:52	1–1
	1–2	41:53 – Hjalmarsson (Grahm)

2 min
Penalties
8 min
31
Shots
26

10 February 2018; 21:10	Switzerland	8–0 (3–0, 3–0, 2–0)	Korea	Kwandong Hockey Centre, Gangneung; Attendance: 3,606

Game reference

Florence Schelling
Goalies
Shin So-jung
Referees:
(United States) Dina Allen
(Canada) Gabrielle Ariano-Lortie
Linesmen:
(United States) Jessica Leclerc
(Canada) Justine Todd

Müller (S. Benz) (SH) – 10:23	1–0
Müller (S. Benz, Stalder) – 11:24	2–0
Müller (S. Benz, Meier) – 19:49	3–0
Müller – 21:26	4–0
Stänz (Raselli) – 22:21	5–0
Stänz (Raselli) – 37:19	6–0
Stalder (Meier, Müller) (PP) – 49:42	7–0
Stalder (Müller) – 51:48	8–0

12 min
Penalties
6 min
52
Shots
8

12 February 2018; 16:40	Switzerland	3–1 (0–0, 2–0, 1–1)	Japan	Kwandong Hockey Centre, Gangneung; Attendance: 4,033

Game reference

Florence Schelling
Goalies
Nana Fujimoto
Referees:
(Sweden) Gabriella Gran
(Norway) Aina Hove
Linesmen:
(Finland) Jenni Heikkinen
(Slovenia) Natasa Pagon

S. Benz (Rüegg, L. Benz) (PP) – 30:19	1–0
S. Benz (Meier) (PP) – 33:10	2–0
Müller – 44:27	3–0
	3–1	47:33 – Kubo (Hori, H. Toko)

10 min
Penalties
8 min
18
Shots
38

12 February 2018; 21:10	Sweden	8–0 (4–0, 1–0, 3–0)	Korea	Kwandong Hockey Centre, Gangneung; Attendance: 4,244

Game reference

Sara Grahn
Goalies
Shin So-jung
Referees:
(Canada) Gabrielle Ariano-Lortie
(Switzerland) Drahomira Fialova
Linesmen:
(Finland) Johanna Tauriainen
(United States) Jessica Leclerc

Nylén Persson (Alasalmi) (PP) – 04:00	1–0
Lundberg (Rask, Grahm) – 09:47	2–0
Fällman (Rask, Küller) – 10:17	3–0
Udén Johansson (Johansson) – 17:04	4–0
Winberg (Lundberg, Alasalmi) – 24:08	5-0
Nordin (Winberg) – 41:09	6–0
Winberg (Grahm, Nordin) – 41:45	7–0
Stenberg (Winberg) – 45:34	8–0

8 min
Penalties
6 min
50
Shots
19

14 February 2018; 12:10	Sweden	1–2 (0–0, 0–1, 1–1)	Switzerland	Kwandong Hockey Centre, Gangneung; Attendance: 3,545

Game reference

Sara Grahn
Goalies
Florence Schelling
Referees:
(Slovakia) Nikoleta Celárová
(United States) Katie Guay
Linesmen:
(France) Charlotte Girard-Fabre
(Germany) Lisa Linnek

	0–1	33:51 – Müller (Meier, Stalder) (PP)
Borgqvist (Olsson, Nylén Persson) (PP) – 47:35	1–1
	1–2	51:28 – Stänz (Meier, Müller) (PP)

12 min
Penalties
8 min
34
Shots
47

14 February 2018; 16:40	Korea	1–4 (0–2, 1–0, 0–2)	Japan	Kwandong Hockey Centre, Gangneung; Attendance: 4,110

Game reference

Shin So-jung
Goalies
Akane Konishi
Referees:
(Switzerland) Drahomira Fialova
(Germany) Nicole Hertrich
Linesmen:
(United States) Jessica Leclerc
(Czech Republic) Zuzana Svobodová

	0–1	01:07 – Kubo (H. Toko, Ukita)
	0–2	03:58 – Ono (Koike, Yoneyama) (PP)
Griffin (Park Yo.) – 29:31	1–2
	1–3	51:42 – Koike (Hosoyamada, Yoneyama) (PP)
	1–4	58:33 – Ukita (ENG)

6 min
Penalties
4 min
13
Shots
44

== Playoff round ==
=== Bracket ===
Quarterfinals
17 February
Olympic Athletes from Russia	6
Switzerland	2
17 February
Finland	7
Sweden	2

Semifinals
19 February
Canada	5
Olympic Athletes from Russia	0
19 February
United States	5
Finland	0

Final
22 February
Canada	2
United States (GWS)	3
Bronze medal game
21 February
Finland	3
Olympic Athletes from Russia	2

Fifth place bracket

5–8th place semifinals
18 February
Switzerland	2
Korea	0
18 February
Sweden	1
Japan (OT)	2

Fifth place game
20 February
Switzerland	1
Japan	0
Seventh place game
20 February
Sweden	6
Korea	1

=== Quarterfinals ===
The top two teams in Group A received byes and were deemed the home team in the semifinals as they were seeded to advance.

17 February 2018; 12:10	Olympic Athletes from Russia	6–2 (1–0, 2–2, 3–0)	Switzerland	Kwandong Hockey Centre, Gangneung; Attendance: 3,903

Game reference

Nadezhda Morozova
Goalies
Florence Schelling
Referees:
(Slovakia) Nikoleta Celárová
(Sweden) Gabriella Gran
Linesmen:
(France) Charlotte Girard-Fabre
(Finland) Johanna Tauriainen

Shokhina (SH2) – 07:22	1–0
	1–1	20:48 – Müller (Meier)
	1–2	31:47 – Stalder (Stänz, Meier) (PP)
Kulishova (Smolina) – 33:53	2–2
Ganeyeva (Shokhina) (PP) – 38:53	3–2
Dergachyova (Shokhina) – 47:36	4–2
Shokhina (Dergachyova) (PP) – 53:25	5–2
Sosina (SH, ENG) – 59:08	6–2

12 min
Penalties
8 min
21
Shots
19

17 February 2018; 16:40	Finland	7–2 (3–0, 2–2, 2–0)	Sweden	Kwandong Hockey Centre, Gangneung; Attendance: 3,803

Game reference

Noora Räty
Goalies
Sara Grahn
Sarah Berglind
Referees:
(Switzerland) Drahomira Fialova
(United States) Katie Guay
Linesmen:
(Slovenia) Natasa Pagon
(Czech Republic) Zuzana Svobodová

Nieminen (Hovi) – 06:12	1–0
Välilä (Rahunen) – 15:32	2–0
Tapani (Tulus, Välimäki) (PP) – 17:44	3–0
Karvinen (Tuominen, Savolainen) – 27:14	4–0
	4–1	28:53 – Nordin (Grahm, Svedin)
Välilä (Karvinen, Tapani) – 29:29	5–1
	5–2	39:12 – Stenberg (Nylén Persson) (SH)
Nuutinen (Tulus, Rahunen) - 44:35	6–2
Hakala (Rajahuhta) - 57:47	7–2

4 min
Penalties
12 min
31
Shots
21

=== 5–8th place semifinals ===
18 February 2018; 12:10	Switzerland	2–0 (1–0, 1–0, 0–0)	Korea	Kwandong Hockey Centre, Gangneung; Attendance: 3,811

Game reference
Janine Alder	Goalies	Shin So-jung	Referees: (Canada) Gabrielle Ariano-Lortie (Sweden) Katarina Timglas; Linesmen: (Finland) Jenni Heikkinen (Sweden) Veronica Johansson
Zollinger (Bullo, L. Benz) (PP) – 16:35 / 1–0; Raselli (Rüegg, Altmann) – 38:52 / 2–0			Referees: (Canada) Gabrielle Ariano-Lortie (Sweden) Katarina Timglas; Linesmen: (Finland) Jenni Heikkinen (Sweden) Veronica Johansson
2 min	Penalties	8 min	Referees: (Canada) Gabrielle Ariano-Lortie (Sweden) Katarina Timglas; Linesmen: (Finland) Jenni Heikkinen (Sweden) Veronica Johansson
53	Shots	19	Referees: (Canada) Gabrielle Ariano-Lortie (Sweden) Katarina Timglas; Linesmen: (Finland) Jenni Heikkinen (Sweden) Veronica Johansson

18 February 2018; 16:40	Sweden	1–2 OT (0–0, 1–1, 0–0) (OT: 0–1)	Japan	Kwandong Hockey Centre, Gangneung; Attendance: 3,554

Game reference

Sara Grahn
Goalies
Nana Fujimoto
Referees:
(United States) Dina Allen
(Norway) Aina Hove
Linesmen:
(United States) Jessica Leclerc
(Canada) Justine Todd

	0–1	21:43 – Koike (Yoneyama, Ono)
Johansson (SH) – 26:25	1–1
	1–2	63:16 – A. Toko (Osawa)

8 min
Penalties
8 min
29
Shots
37

=== Semifinals ===
19 February 2018; 13:10	United States	5−0 (2−0, 2−0, 1−0)	Finland	Gangneung Hockey Centre, Gangneung; Attendance: 5,173

Game reference

Maddie Rooney
Goalies
Noora Räty
Referees:
(Slovakia) Nikoleta Celárová
(Germany) Nicole Hertrich
Linesmen:
(Slovenia) Nataša Pagon
(Canada) Justine Todd

Marvin (Duggan, Pelkey) − 02:25	1−0
Cameranesi − 18:38	2−0
Lamoureux-Davidson (Pannek, Cameranesi) (PP2) – 33:21	3−0
Knight (Morin, Coyne) (PP) − 33:55	4−0
Cameranesi (Brandt, Kessel) (PP) – 40:45	5–0

6 min
Penalties
12 min
38
Shots
14

19 February 2018; 21:10	Canada	5–0 (1–0, 1–0, 3–0)	Olympic Athletes from Russia	Gangneung Hockey Centre, Gangneung; Attendance: 3,396

Game reference

Shannon Szabados
Goalies
Valeria Tarakanova
Nadezhda Alexandrova
Referees:
(United States) Katie Guay
(United States) Melissa Szkola
Linesmen:
(Germany) Lisa Linnek
(Finland) Johanna Tauriainen

Wakefield (Spooner, Turnbull) – 01:50	1–0
Poulin (Daoust) – 23:10	2–0
Wakefield (Fortino, Turnbull) – 41:59	3–0
Clark (Stacey, Mikkelson) – 42:30	4–0
Johnston (Daoust, Irwin) (PP) – 54:08	5–0

4 min
Penalties
16 min
47
Shots
14

=== Seventh place game ===
20 February 2018; 12:10	Sweden	6–1 (2–1, 1–0, 3–0)	Korea	Kwandong Hockey Centre, Gangneung; Attendance: 4,125

Game reference

Minatsu Murase
Sarah Berglind
Goalies
Shin So-jung
Han Do-hee
Referees:
(Switzerland) Drahomira Fialova
(Norway) Aina Hove
Linesmen:
(Finland) Jenni Heikkinen
(Slovenia) Nataša Pagon

Küller (Rask, Udén Johansson) – 05:50	1–0
	1–1	06:21 – Han S. (Park J.) (PP)
Alasalmi (Nylén Persson, Borgqvist) (PP) – 19:37	2–1
Grahm (Rask, Nordin) – 36:27	3–1
Svedin (Johansson, Hjalmarsson) – 43:05	4–1
Rask (Lindh) – 49:31	5–1
Johansson (Borgqvist, Hjalmarsson) – 57:19	6–1

6 min
Penalties
4 min
40
Shots
16

=== Fifth place game ===
20 February 2018; 16:40	Switzerland	1–0 (1–0, 0–0, 0–0)	Japan	Kwandong Hockey Centre, Gangneung; Attendance: 3,958

Game reference
Florence Schelling	Goalies	Nana Fujimoto	Referees: (Sweden) Gabriella Gran (Sweden) Katarina Timglas; Linesmen: (France) Charlotte Girard-Fabre (Sweden) Veronica Johansson
Raselli – 03:19 / 1–0			Referees: (Sweden) Gabriella Gran (Sweden) Katarina Timglas; Linesmen: (France) Charlotte Girard-Fabre (Sweden) Veronica Johansson
6 min	Penalties	4 min	Referees: (Sweden) Gabriella Gran (Sweden) Katarina Timglas; Linesmen: (France) Charlotte Girard-Fabre (Sweden) Veronica Johansson
14	Shots	20	Referees: (Sweden) Gabriella Gran (Sweden) Katarina Timglas; Linesmen: (France) Charlotte Girard-Fabre (Sweden) Veronica Johansson

=== Bronze medal game ===
21 February 2018; 16:40	(bronze) Finland	3–2 (1–0, 2–1, 0–1)	Olympic Athletes from Russia	Kwandong Hockey Centre, Gangneung; Attendance: 3,217

Game reference

Noora Räty
Goalies
Nadezhda Morozova
Referees:
(United States) Dina Allen
(Canada) Gabrielle Ariano-Lortie
Linesmen:
(United States) Jessica Leclerc
(Canada) Justine Todd

Nieminen (Tuominen, Tapani) (PP) – 02:23	1–0
Tapani (Karvinen) – 20:10	2–0
	2–1	22:40 – Sosina (Belyakova)
Välimäki (Hovi) – 32:18	3–1
	3–2	46:03 – Belyakova (Batalova, Shtaryova) (PP)

8 min
Penalties
35 min
22
Shots
22

=== Gold medal game ===
22 February 2018; 13:10	(silver) Canada	2–3 GWS (0–1, 2–0, 0–1) (OT: 0–0) (SO: 0–1)	United States (gold)	Gangneung Hockey Centre, Gangneung; Attendance: 4,467

Game reference

Shannon Szabados
Goalies
Maddie Rooney
Referees:
(Germany) Nicole Hertrich
(Sweden) Katarina Timglas
Linesmen:
(Germany) Lisa Linnek
(Finland) Johanna Tauriainen

	0–1	19:34 – Knight (Morin, Decker) (PP)
Irwin (Turnbull) – 22:00	1–1
Poulin (Agosta, Daoust) – 26:55	2–1
	2–2	53:39 – Lamoureux-Morando (Pannek)

Spooner (miss)
Agosta
Poulin (miss)
Daoust
Jenner (miss)
Agosta (miss)
Shootout
Marvin
(miss) Brandt
(miss) Pfalzer
Kessel
(miss) Knight
Lamoureux-Davidson
12 min
Penalties
6 min
31
Shots
42

== Medalists ==
Event	Gold	Silver	Bronze
Women's tournament	United States; Lee Stecklein; Cayla Barnes; Megan Keller; Kali Flanagan; Monique Lamoureux-Morando; Emily Pfalzer; Meghan Duggan (C); Haley Skarupa; Kelly Pannek; Brianna Decker (A); Jocelyne Lamoureux-Davidson; Gigi Marvin; Hannah Brandt; Hilary Knight; Kacey Bellamy (A); Sidney Morin; Dani Cameranesi; Kendall Coyne; Amanda Kessel; Nicole Hensley (G); Alex Rigsby (G); Maddie Rooney (G); Amanda Pelkey Head coach: Robb Stauber	Canada; Shannon Szabados (G); Meghan Agosta (A); Jocelyne Larocque (A); Brigette Lacquette; Lauriane Rougeau; Rebecca Johnston; Laura Stacey; Laura Fortino; Jenn Wakefield; Jill Saulnier; Meaghan Mikkelson; Renata Fast; Mélodie Daoust; Bailey Bram; Brianne Jenner (A); Sarah Nurse; Haley Irwin; Natalie Spooner; Emily Clark; Marie-Philip Poulin (C); Geneviève Lacasse (G); Ann-Renée Desbiens (G); Blayre Turnbull Head coach: Laura Schuler	Finland; Eveliina Suonpää (G); Isa Rahunen; Rosa Lindstedt; Jenni Hiirikoski (C); Mira Jalosuo; Ella Viitasuo; Venla Hovi; Linda Välimäki; Annina Rajahuhta; Riikka Välilä (A); Minttu Tuominen; Meeri Räisänen (G); Petra Nieminen; Emma Nuutinen; Sanni Hakala; Noora Tulus; Sara Säkkinen; Saila Saari; Michelle Karvinen (A); Noora Räty (G); Tanja Niskanen; Susanna Tapani; Ronja Savolainen Head coach: Pasi Mustonen

== Final ranking ==
Pos	Grp	Team	Pld	W	OTW	OTL	L	GF	GA	GD	Pts
1st place, gold medalist(s)	A	United States	5	3	1	0	1	17	5	+12	11
2nd place, silver medalist(s)	A	Canada	5	4	0	1	0	18	5	+13	13
3rd place, bronze medalist(s)	A	Finland	6	3	0	0	3	17	17	0	9
4	A	Olympic Athletes from Russia	6	1	0	0	5	9	25	−16	3
5	B	Switzerland	6	5	0	0	1	18	8	+10	15
6	B	Japan	5	1	1	0	3	8	8	0	5
7	B	Sweden	6	3	0	1	2	20	13	+7	10
8	B	Korea (H)	5	0	0	0	5	2	28	−26	0

Source: IIHF.com
(H) Host

2018 Women's Olympic champions

United States
2nd title

== Statistics ==
=== Scoring leaders ===
List shows the top ten skaters sorted by points, then goals.

Player	GP	G	A	Pts	+/−	PIM	POS
(Switzerland) Alina Müller	6	7	3	10	+5	4	F
(Switzerland) Christine Meier	6	0	8	8	+4	0	D
(Canada) Mélodie Daoust	5	3	4	7	+7	2	F
(Canada) Marie-Philip Poulin	5	3	3	6	+5	8	F
(Switzerland) Lara Stalder	6	3	3	6	+3	4	F
(Finland) Michelle Karvinen	6	3	3	6	–1	2	F
(Sweden) Fanny Rask	6	2	4	6	+4	0	F
(United States) Jocelyne Lamoureux-Davidson	5	4	1	5	+3	0	F
(Finland) Riikka Välilä	6	4	1	5	–2	0	F
(Canada) Rebecca Johnston	5	3	2	5	+2	2	F
(United States) Dani Cameranesi	5	3	2	5	+1	0	F

GP = Games played; G = Goals; A = Assists; Pts = Points; +/− = Plus/minus; PIM = Penalties in minutes; POS = Position
Source: IIHF.com

=== Leading goaltenders ===
Only the top five goaltenders, based on save percentage, who have played at least 40% of their team's minutes, are included in this list.

Player	TOI	GA	GAA	SA	Sv%	SO
(Canada) Shannon Szabados	200:00	4	1.20	79	94.94	1
(United States) Maddie Rooney	258:56	5	1.16	92	94.57	1
(Sweden) Sara Grahn	262:14	8	1.83	145	94.48	1
(Switzerland) Florence Schelling	298:19	7	1.41	120	94.17	2
(Japan) Nana Fujimoto	236:30	7	1.78	87	91.95	0

TOI = Time on ice (minutes:seconds); SA = Shots against; GA = Goals against; GAA = Goals against average; Sv% = Save percentage; SO = Shutouts
Source: IIHF.com

== Awards ==
- Media All-Stars
  - Goaltender: (Finland) Noora Räty
  - Defencemen: (Finland) Jenni Hiirikoski, (Canada) Laura Fortino
  - Forwards: (Canada) Mélodie Daoust, (United States) Jocelyne Lamoureux, (Switzerland) Alina Müller
- Most Valuable Player: (Canada) Mélodie Daoust
- Best players selected by the directorate:
  - Best Goaltender: (Canada) Shannon Szabados
  - Best Defenceman: (Finland) Jenni Hiirikoski
  - Best Forward: (Switzerland) Alina Müller

Source: IIHF.com
