= Korea national ice hockey team =

Korea national ice hockey team may refer to:

North Korea

- North Korea men's national ice hockey team
- North Korea women's national ice hockey team

South Korea

- South Korea men's national ice hockey team
- South Korea women's national ice hockey team

Unified Korea

- Unified Korea women's ice hockey team
