= Marissa Brandt =

Korean-American ice hockey player

Personal information
- Born: 박윤정 (Korean); Park Yoon-jung; December 18, 1992 (age 33) Seoul, South Korea
- Home town: Vadnais Heights, Minnesota, United States
Ice hockey career
- Height: 5 ft 7 in (170 cm)
- Weight: 65 kg (143 lb; 10 st 3 lb)
- Position: Defense
- Shoots: Right
- Played for: Phoenix (KWHL); GAC Golden Gusties
- National team: Korea and South Korea
- Playing career: 2011–present

Marissa Brandt (born December 18, 1992), also known by her birth name Park Yoon-jung (Korean: 박윤정; also stylized as Park Yoon Jung or Park Yoonjung), is a Korean-American ice hockey player who plays with the South Korean national team. When competing internationally with the South Korean or Unified Korean national teams, she uses her birth name.

== Playing career ==
Brandt played college ice hockey with the Golden Gusties ice hockey program at Gustavus Adolphus College in the Minnesota Intercollegiate Athletic Conference (MIAC). Across four years with the program, she tallied 34 points in 111 games.

She competed with the unified Korean national team in the women's ice hockey tournament at 2018 Winter Olympics. Brandt notched an assist on Randi Griffin’s goal against Japan in the preliminary round, one of two goals scored for Korea during the tournament.

After the 2018 Olympics, she was named an honorary ambassador to help promote post-adoption services and birth family searches by the South Korean Minister for Health & Welfare Park Neung-hoo.

She also competed with the South Korean team at the 2018 IIHF Women's World Championship Division I Group B tournament, where she led the team in total goals scored (5), including a 4 goal hat trick in the team's 9-2 win against Poland.

In 2023, she again competed for the South Korean team at the 2023 IIHF Women's World Championship Division I Group B tournament and helped the South Korean team win 1st place and achieve their first ever promotion to Division I Group A.

== Personal life ==
She is the adopted sister of Hannah Brandt, a centre who played with the United States women's national ice hockey team at the 2018 Winter Olympic Games and is currently affiliated with the Professional Women's Hockey Players Association (PWHPA).

In her youth, she was a figure skater before switching to hockey.
