= Hannah Brandt =

American ice hockey player (born 1993)

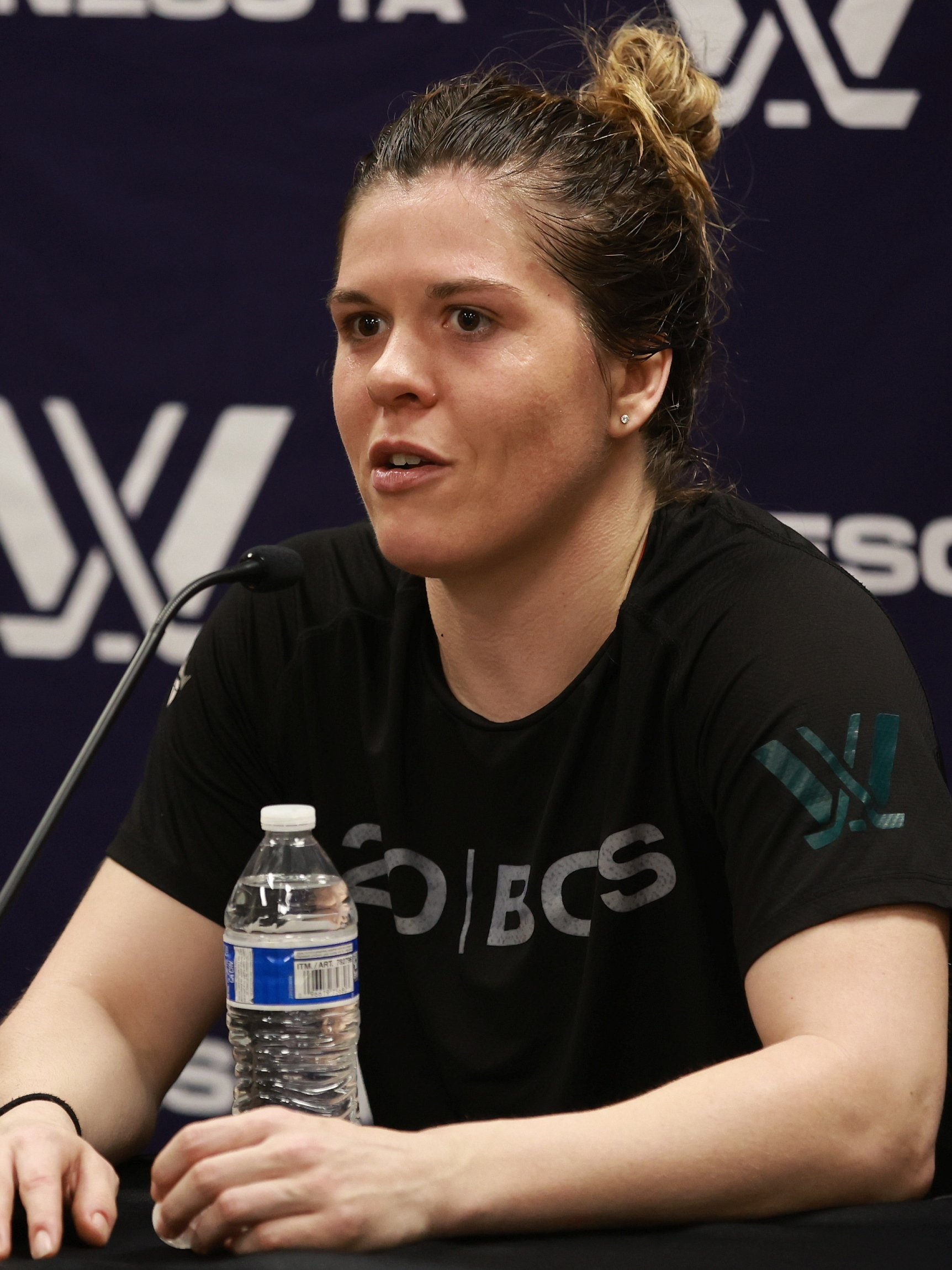
- Brandt in 2024
- Born: November 27, 1993 (age 32) Vadnais Heights, Minnesota, U.S.
- Height: 5 ft 6 in (168 cm)
- Weight: 150 lb (68 kg; 10 st 10 lb)
- Position: Forward
- Shot: Right
- Played for: Boston Fleet; Minnesota Whitecaps
- National team: United States
- Playing career: 2012–2026
Medal record
Olympic Games
Gold medal – first place	2018 Pyeongchang	Team
Silver medal – second place	2022 Beijing	Team
World Championships
Gold medal – first place	2015 Sweden
Gold medal – first place	2017 United States
Gold medal – first place	2019 Finland
Silver medal – second place	2012 United States
Silver medal – second place	2022 Denmark
World U18 Championships
Gold medal – first place	2011 Sweden

Hannah Brandt (born November 27, 1993) is an American former professional ice hockey centre. She was named to the United States women's national ice hockey team, which represented the United States at the 2012 IIHF Women's World Championship. She won the 2012 Minnesota Ms. Hockey Award. She debuted for the U.S. national women's team at the 2014 4 Nations Cup in Kamloops, British Columbia, Canada.

== Playing career ==
=== High school ===
With the Hill-Murray Pioneers, she registered 59 goals and 31 assists in 26 games of the 2011–12 campaign. In 2011–12, Brandt had 22 multiple-point and 20 multiple-goal games this season. In addition, she accumulated 13 hat tricks and three six-point games. Her five-year career with the Pioneers resulted in total numbers of 192 goals and 142 assists. She committed to play at the University of Minnesota along with fellow 2012 Minnesota Ms. Hockey finalists Milica McMillen and Lee Stecklein.

=== NCAA ===
Brandt scored 33 goals and made 49 assists in her first season at Minnesota. Her 82 points were the second most in Division 1 for the 2012–13 season, with only linemate Amanda Kessel tallying more. The team had an undefeated season and won the 2013 NCAA title. Brandt was one of ten nominees for the Patty Kazmaier Trophy and was named WCHA Rookie of the Year.

In her sophomore season, Brandt had the most assists in Division 1. She was the top goal scorer on her team, which reached the NCAA championship game. Brandt again led Minnesota in goals in her junior year, and her team won the 2015 NCAA title by defeating Harvard. Brandt was named as one of three finalists for the Kazmaier Trophy and as WCHA Player of the Year in both her sophomore and junior seasons.

Her third-period goal against Harvard goaltender Emerance Maschmeyer in the championship game of the 2015 NCAA National Collegiate Women's Ice Hockey Tournament would stand as the game-winning tally for the Golden Gophers.

=== USA Hockey ===
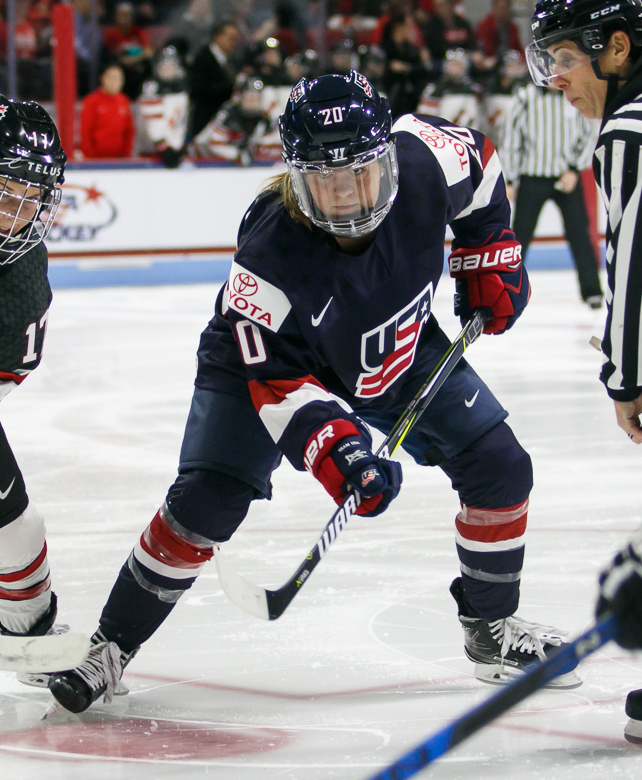
Brandt with Team USA in 2017

Brandt won a gold medal with the United States national under-18 team at the 2011 International Ice Hockey Federation's world championships. In December 2011, she earned the opportunity to train with the U.S. national senior women's team.

She was named to the roster of the United States national women's ice hockey team that competed at the 2015 IIHF Women's World Championship.

On January 1, 2018, Brandt was named to Team USA's roster to represent the United States at the 2018 Winter Olympics. She helped Team USA win their first gold medal since 1998, and finished the tournament with two points in five games.

On January 2, 2022, Brandt was named to Team USA's roster to represent the United States at the 2022 Winter Olympics.

=== NWHL ===
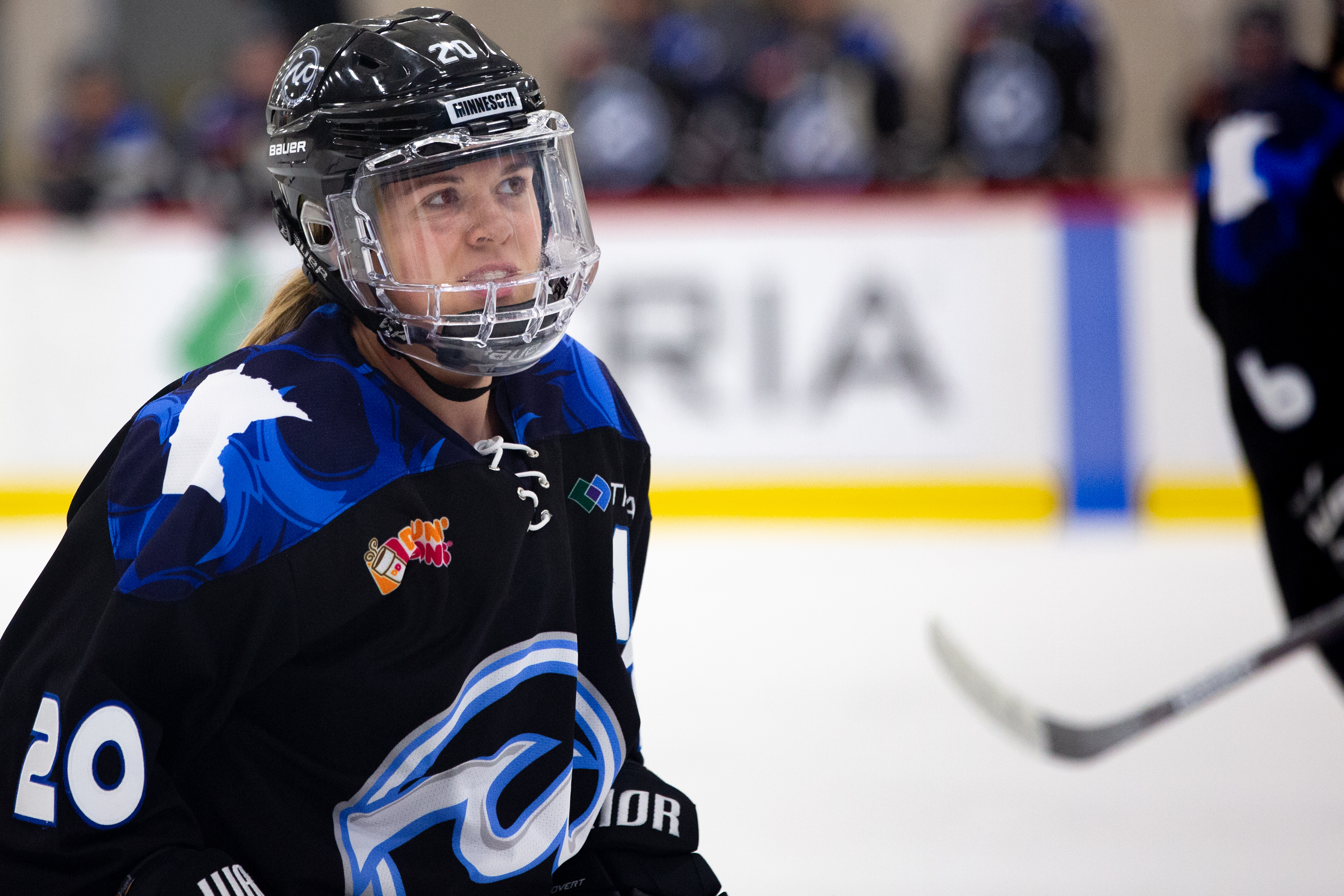
Brandt with the Minnesota Whitecaps in 2018

In the 2015 NWHL Draft, she was selected second overall, drafted by the Connecticut Whale. On April 27, 2016, her rights were traded to the New York Riveters.

On June 20, 2018, Brandt signed as a free agent with the Minnesota Whitecaps prior to them debuting in the NWHL for the 2018–19 NWHL season. She would spend one season in the NWHL before moving to the PWHPA.

=== PWHL ===
Brandt was drafted in the fifth round of the 2023 PWHL Draft by PWHL Boston. During the 2023–24 season she recorded five goals and five assists in 24 games and one goal and one assist in eight playoff games during the Walter Cup. On June 20, 2024, she signed a two-year contract extension with Boston.

=== Other ===
Brandt scored the first goal for Team Americas in a 3–1 win at the 2019 Aurora Games.

== Personal life ==
Brandt has one sister, Marissa Brandt. Their parents, Greg and Robin, struggled with infertility for the first 12 years of their marriage and decided to adopt a child. They chose to adopt from South Korea partly because Greg's sister had adopted two boys from that country and adopted an infant girl, naming her Marissa. About two weeks before Marissa was set to arrive in the U.S., the couple found out that Robin was pregnant; she gave birth to Hannah about six months after Marissa joined the family.

The sisters were originally involved in figure skating as small children, but Hannah switched to hockey at age 5, with Marissa following suit a few years later. They then played on the same teams until Marissa graduated from Hill-Murray School a year before Hannah; Marissa went to NCAA Division III school Gustavus Adolphus College while Hannah went to Minnesota. Both won gold medals at the 2017 IIHF Women's World Championships—Hannah for Team USA in the top division, and Marissa for South Korea in Division II (the third level) under her birth name of Park Yoon-jung. The sisters played in the 2018 Winter Olympics.

== Career statistics ==
=== Regular season and playoffs ===
Note: GP = Games played; G = Goals; A = Assists; Pts = Points; PIM = Penalty minutes;

			Regular season					Playoffs
Season	Team	League	GP	G	A	Pts	PIM	GP	G	A	Pts	PIM
2012–13	Minnesota Golden Gophers	WCHA	41	33	49	82	16	—	—	—	—	—
2013–14	Minnesota Golden Gophers	WCHA	41	23	42	65	14	—	—	—	—	—
2014–15	Minnesota Golden Gophers	WCHA	40	34	40	74	14	—	—	—	—	—
2015–16	Minnesota Golden Gophers	WCHA	36	25	39	64	4	—	—	—	—	—
2018–19	Minnesota Whitecaps	NWHL	16	5	6	11	0	2	2	0	2	2
2020–21	Team Adidas	PWHPA	6	0	1	1	0	—	—	—	—	—
2022–23	Team Sonnet	PWHPA	20	7	4	11	4	—	—	—	—	—
2023–24	PWHL Boston	PWHL	24	5	5	10	4	8	1	1	2	4
2024–25	Boston Fleet	PWHL	30	3	8	11	14	—	—	—	—	—
NWHL totals			16	5	6	11	0	2	2	0	2	2
PWHPA totals			26	7	5	12	4	—	—	—	—	—
PWHL totals			54	8	13	21	18	8	1	1	2	4

=== International ===
Note: GP = Games played; G = Goals; A = Assists; Pts = Points; PIM = Penalty minutes;

				Regular season
Year	Team	Event	Result	GP	G	A	Pts	PIM
2011	United States	U18	1st place, gold medalist(s)	5	5	5	10	2
2012	United States	WC	2nd place, silver medalist(s)	5	0	0	0	0
2015	United States	WC	1st place, gold medalist(s)	5	3	2	5	2
2017	United States	WC	1st place, gold medalist(s)	5	1	0	1	0
2018	United States	OG	1st place, gold medalist(s)	5	1	1	2	2
2019	United States	WC	1st place, gold medalist(s)	3	0	1	1	0
2022	United States	OG	2nd place, silver medalist(s)	7	0	6	6	2
2022	United States	WC	2nd place, silver medalist(s)	7	2	3	5	4
Junior totals				5	5	5	10	2
Senior totals				37	7	13	20	10

== Awards and honors ==
- Minnesota High School hockey All-State selection (2009, 2010, 2011, 2012)
- Pioneer Press player of the year
- 2012 MVP at Hill-Murray
- 2012 Minnesota Ms. Hockey Award

=== NCAA ===
- Finalist, 2014 Patty Kazmaier Award
- Top 10 Finalist, 2015 Patty Kazmaier Award
- 2015 CCM Hockey Women's Division I All-Americans, First Team

==== WCHA ====
- WCHA Rookie of the Week (Week of October 25, 2012)
- WCHA Player of the Week (Week of October 28, 2014)
- 2015 WCHA Player of the Year
- 2015 WCHA Scoring Champion

=== NWHL ===
- VEDA NWHL Player of the Week (Awarded October 8, 2018)
