= Han Do-hee =

South Korean ice hockey player (born 1994)

- Born: November 16, 1994 (age 31) South Korea
- Height: 159 cm (5 ft 3 in)
- Weight: 60 kg (132 lb; 9 st 6 lb)
- Position: Goaltender
- Catches: Left
- Current team Former teams: Suwon City; Ice Avengers (KWHL)
- National team: South Korea and Korea
- Playing career: 2011–present

Han Do-hee (born 16 November 1994) is a South Korean ice hockey player. She competed in the 2018 Winter Olympics.

== Career statistics ==
=== International ===
Note: GP = Games played; Min, TOI = Minutes played; W = Wins; L = Losses; T,T/OT = Ties; OTL = Overtime losses; GA = Goals-against; GAA = Goals-against average; SO = Shutouts; SV% = Save percentage;

				Regular season
Year	Team	Event	Result	GP	W	L	T/OT	MIN	GA	SO	GAA	SV%
2018	Korea	OG	8th	1	0	0	0	2:59	1	0	20.11	0.500

== Awards and honors ==
- Directorate Award, Best Goaltender: 2017 IIHF Women's World Championship Division II, Group A
- Best Player on Team, Selected By Coaches: 2017 IIHF Women's World Championship Division II, Group A
