= Lee Yeon-jeong =

South Korean ice hockey player

- Born: November 2, 1994 (age 31) South Korea
- Height: 160 cm (5 ft 3 in)
- Weight: 52 kg (115 lb; 8 st 3 lb)
- Position: Forward
- Shot: Right
- KWHL team: Ice Beat
- National team: South Korea and Korea
- Playing career: 2011–2019

Lee Yeon-jeong (born 2 November 1994) is a South Korean ice hockey player. She competed in the 2018 Winter Olympics.
