= Eom Su-yeon =

South Korean ice hockey player (born 2001)

Eom Su-yeon 엄 수연
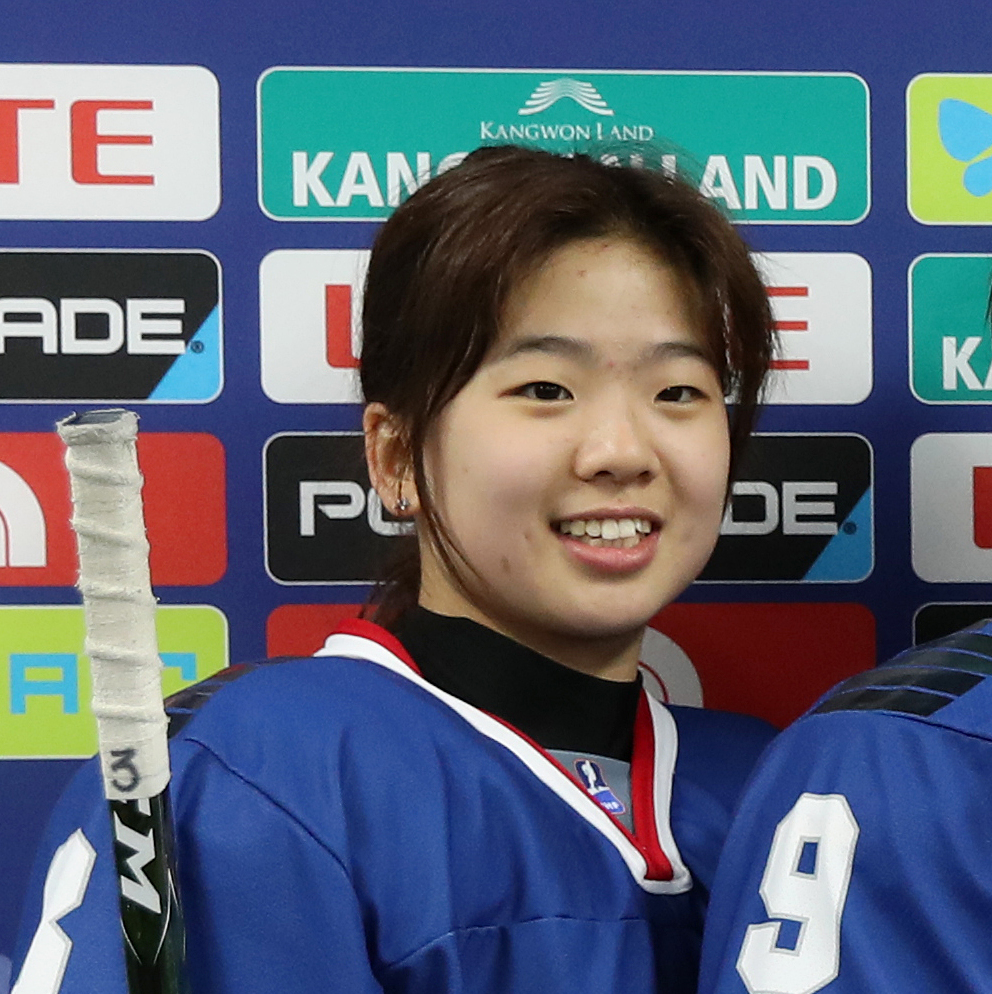
- Eom representing South Korea at the 2017 World Championship Division 2A
- Born: 1 February 2001 (age 24)
- Height: 168 cm (5 ft 6 in)
- Weight: 60 kg (132 lb; 9 st 6 lb)
- Position: Defence
- Shoots: Right
- NCAA team Former teams: St. Lawrence Saints; Ice Avengers
- National team: South Korea and Korea
- Playing career: 2017–present

Eom Su-yeon (Korean: 엄수연; born 1 February 2001) is a South Korean ice hockey player who competes for the South Korean national team and is currently a member of the St. Lawrence Saints women's ice hockey team in the NCAA Division I ECAC Hockey conference.

== Career ==
=== Korean National Team ===
Eom competed for South Korea in the ice hockey girls' individual skills challenge at the 2016 Winter Youth Olympics. She advanced to the finals with a 5th-place ranking, having placed among the top three in the Fastest Lap, Shooting Accuracy, and Skating Agility events during the preliminaries.

She took part in the 2018 Winter Olympics held in PyeongChang, South Korea, as a member of the unified team, which marked the first time athletes from North and South Korea competed together on a single team at the Olympic level. The roster consisted of 35 players, with 23 selected for each game, and included athletes from both nations. The team was led by head coach Sarah Murray, an American-Canadian former player, who had previously been coaching the South Korean national team. Competing in Group B, the unified Korean team faced formidable opponents in Switzerland, Japan, and Sweden. While the team did not advance beyond the group stage, their participation was widely regarded as a symbolic gesture of diplomacy and unity amidst ongoing tensions between the two Koreas.

In 2019, Eom was part of South Korea's first-ever women's U18 team to compete in the 2019 IIHF World Women's U18 Championship in the Group 1B Qualification Tournament. The team remained unbeaten throughout the event and captured the gold medal. Eom earned recognition as the tournament's Best Defender.

=== NCAA ===
Eom started her college ice hockey journey with the St. Lawrence Saints during the 2021–22 season. Midway through the season, she transitioned from defence to forward and went on to score her first college goal on February 4, 2022, helping secure a 3–0 win over Princeton University.
