= Danelle Im =

Canadian-born South Korean ice hockey player

- Born: 21 January 1993 (age 32) Toronto, Ontario, Canada
- Height: 162 cm (5 ft 4 in)
- Weight: 55 kg (121 lb; 8 st 9 lb)
- Position: Forward
- Shoots: Right
- KWHL team: Phoenix
- National team: South Korea and Korea
- Playing career: 2016–present

Danelle Im (born 21 January 1993) is a South Korean ice hockey player.

== Career ==
She competed in the 2018 Winter Olympics as part of a unified team of 35 players drawn from both North and South Korea. The team's coach was Sarah Murray and the team was in Group B competing against Switzerland, Japan and Sweden.
