= Jung Si-yun =

South Korean ice hockey player (born 2000)

- Born: September 8, 2000 (age 25) South Korea
- Height: 171 cm (5 ft 7 in)
- Weight: 64 kg (141 lb; 10 st 1 lb)
- Position: Forward
- Shoots: Right
- KWHL team: Ice Avengers
- National team: South Korea and Korea
- Playing career: 2016–present

Jung Si-yun (born 8 September 2000) is a South Korean ice hockey player. She competed in the 2018 Winter Olympics.
