= Ryo Song-hui =

North Korean ice hockey player

- Born: 15 January 1994 (age 31) North Korea
- Height: 157 cm (5 ft 2 in)
- Weight: 61 kg (134 lb; 9 st 8 lb)
- Position: Forward
- Shoots: Right
- National team: North Korea and Korea
- Playing career: 2013–present

- Ryo Song-hui
- Hangul: 려송희
- RR: Ryeo Songhui
- MR: Ryŏ Songhŭi

Ryo Song-hui (born 15 January 1994) is a North Korean ice hockey player. She competed in the 2018 Winter Olympics.
