= Lee Jin-gyu =

South Korean ice hockey player

- Born: January 13, 2000 (age 25); Boulder, CO
- Height: 163 cm (5 ft 4 in)
- Weight: 59 kg (130 lb; 9 st 4 lb)
- Position: Forward
- NCAA team Former teams: Yale Bulldogs; Phoenix
- National team: South Korea and Korea
- Playing career: 2017–present

Grace Lee (Lee Jin-gyu) (born 13 January 2000) is an American-South Korean ice hockey player. She competed in the 2018 Winter Olympics as a member of the unified Korea women's national ice hockey team. She also plays for the Yale University women's hockey team.

== Career ==
=== Korean National Team ===
She competed in the 2018 Winter Olympics as part of a unified team of 35 players drawn from both North and South Korea. The team's coach was Sarah Murray and the team was in Group B competing against Switzerland, Japan and Sweden.

Following her Olympic appearance, Lee competed with the South Korean team at the 2018 IIHF Women's World Championship Division I Group B tournament, where she contributed 4 points (2 goals and 2 assists).

=== NCAA ===
Lee began her college ice hockey career with the Yale University women's ice hockey program in the 2019-2020 season. During her rookie season, she was named ECAC Rookie of the Week for the first week of November scoring 5 points (2 goals, 3 assists), and was also named ECAC Rookie of the month of November for tallying 9 points on 5 goals and 4 assists.
