= Cho Mi-hwan =

South Korean ice hockey player (born 1995)

- Born: March 30, 1995 (age 30); South Korea
- Height: 160 cm (5 ft 3 in)
- Weight: 58 kg (128 lb; 9 st 2 lb)
- Position: Defence
- Shoots: Left
- KWHL team: Ice Avengers
- National team: South Korea and Korea
- Playing career: 2011–present

- Korean name
- Hangul: 조미환
- RR: Jo Mihwan
- MR: Cho Mihwan

Cho Mi-hwan (born 30 March 1995) is a South Korean ice hockey player. She competed in the 2018 Winter Olympics.
