= Kim Hee-won (ice hockey) =

South Korean ice hockey player

- Born: August 1, 2001 (age 23); South Korea
- Height: 164 cm (5 ft 5 in)
- Weight: 55 kg (121 lb; 8 st 9 lb)
- Position: Forward
- Shoots: Right
- KWHL team: Ice Avengers
- National team: South Korea and Korea
- Playing career: 2016–present

Kim Hee-won (born 1 August 2001) is a South Korean ice hockey player. She competed in the 2018 Winter Olympics.
