= Genny Kim Knowles =

Canadian ice hockey player (born 2000)

Personal information
- Full name: Genevieve Knowles
- National team: Korea
- Born: April 25, 2000 (age 26) Vancouver, British Columbia, Canada
- Education: Lawrenceville School

Sport
- Sport: Women's ice hockey
- Position: Goaltender

Genevieve Knowles (born April 25, 2000), more commonly known as Genny Kim Knowles, is a Canadian and South Korean ice hockey player. She was born in Vancouver, British Columbia, and played for the Lawrenceville School ice hockey team in Lawrenceville, New Jersey. In 2018 she played for the Pacific Steelers in Canada and Phoenix in South Korea.

She was the reserve goaltender for the Korea women's national ice hockey team at the 2018 Winter Olympics when she was 17 years old. She did not play at the games.

== See also ==
- List of Lawrenceville School alumni
