= Caroline Park (ice hockey) =

Canadian ice hockey player and actress

Dr. Caroline Park
- Born: November 18, 1989 (age 36) Brampton, Ontario
- Height: 5 ft 3 in (160 cm)
- Weight: 125 lb (57 kg; 8 st 13 lb)
- Position: Forward
- Shoots: Right
- National team: South Korea and Korea
- Playing career: 2007–present

Caroline Nancy Park (born November 18, 1989) is a physician, and a former actress and hockey player.

She competed in the 2018 Olympic Games as an ice hockey forward for the Unified Korean team. Park is also a former child actress, having played roles in Naturally, Sadie and Degrassi: The Next Generation.

== Life ==
Park was born in Ontario in 1989. She graduated from Princeton University in 2011 with a degree in Ecology and Evolutionary Biology.

She became a naturalized citizen of South Korea in 2015.

As of 2021 or before, she is a physician.

== Career ==
She competed in the Olympics as part of a unified team of 35 players drawn from both North and South Korea. The team's coach was Sarah Murray and the team was in Group B competing against Switzerland, Japan and Sweden.
