= Choi Yu-jung (ice hockey) =

South Korean ice hockey player (born 2000)

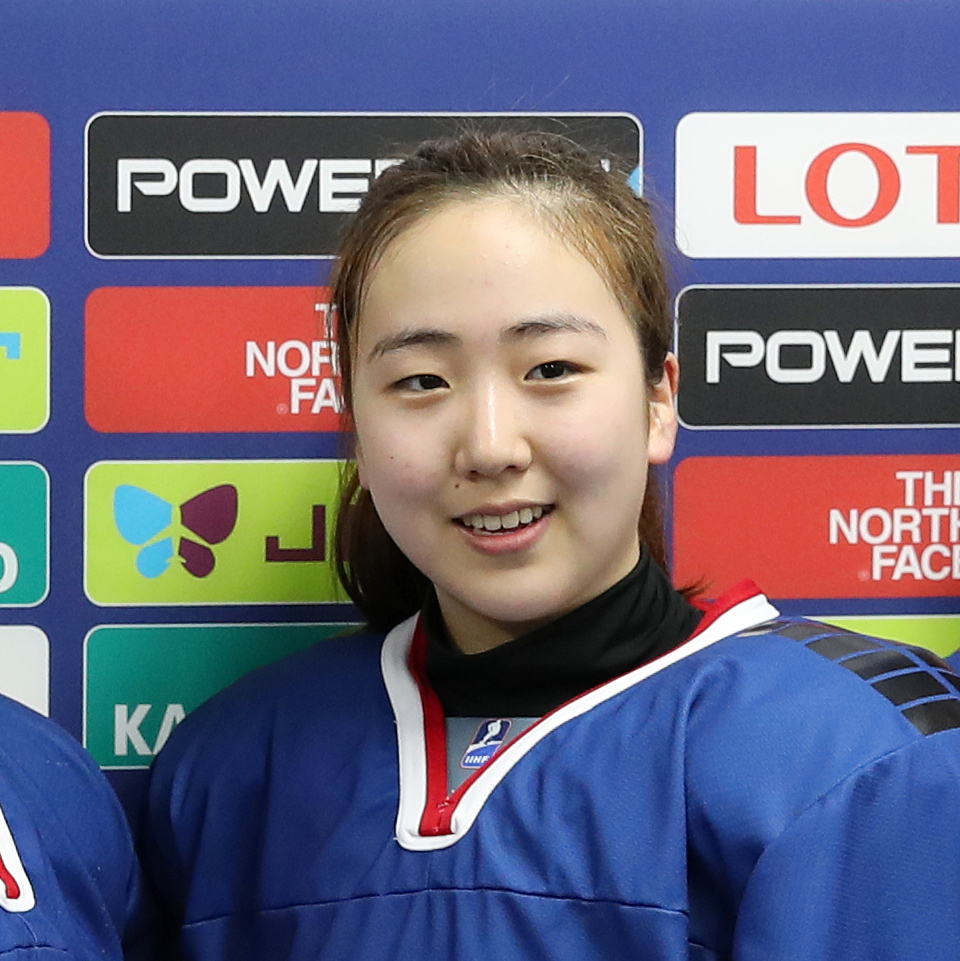
- in 2017`
- Born: March 27, 2000 (age 24); South Korea
- Height: 156 cm (5 ft 1 in)
- Weight: 56 kg (123 lb; 8 st 11 lb)
- Position: Forward
- Shoots: Right
- KWHL team: Ice Beat
- National team: South Korea and Korea
- Playing career: 2016–present

Choi Yu-jung (born 27 March 2000) is a South Korean ice hockey player.

== Life ==
Choi was born in 2000 and took up ice hockey when she was nine as her father who was a teacher was starting a team at her school.

She competed in the 2018 Winter Olympics as part of a unified team of 35 players drawn from both North and South Korea. The team's coach was Sarah Murray and the team was in Group B competing against Switzerland, Japan and Sweden.
