= Ryu Su-jong =

Korean ice hockey defender

- Born: July 24, 1995 (age 30)
- Height: 160 cm (5 ft 3 in)
- Position: Defender
- Shot: Right
- Played for: Kimchaek
- National team: North Korea and Korea
- Playing career: 2014–2019

Ryu Su-jong is a North Korean ice hockey player. She was a member of the Unified Korean team at the 2018 Winter Olympics, and has represented the country at multiple IIHF Division 2A Women's World Championships, including 2018 when the team won bronze.

She played for the Kimchaek youth team.
