= Rebecca Stenberg =

Swedish ice hockey player

- Born: 18 September 1992 (age 33) Piteå, Norrbotten, Sweden
- Height: 165 cm (5 ft 5 in)
- Weight: 62 kg (137 lb; 9 st 11 lb)
- Position: Left wing
- Shot: Left
- Played for: Luleå HF/MSSK; Djurgårdens IF; Munksund Skuthamn SK
- National team: Sweden
- Playing career: 2008–2019

Sally Rebecca Stenberg (born August 18, 1992) is a Swedish retired ice hockey player and former member of the Swedish national ice hockey team. She played her Swedish Women's Hockey League (SDHL) career with Luleå HF/MSSK, Djurgårdens IF Hockey, and the women’s ice hockey team of Munksund Skuthamn SK. With the Swedish national team, she participated in the women’s ice hockey tournament at the 2018 Winter Olympics and at the IIHF World Women's Championships in 2011 and 2012.
