= Minatsu Murase =

Swedish ice hockey player

- Born: 23 June 1995 (age 30) Stockholm, Sweden
- Height: 168 cm (5 ft 6 in)
- Weight: 65 kg (143 lb; 10 st 3 lb)
- Position: Goaltender
- Catches: Left
- SWHL B team: Lausanne HC Féminin
- Played for: AIK IF; HC Örnen; Luleå HF/MSSK
- National team: Sweden
- Playing career: 2011–present

Minatsu Kovács née Murase (born 23 June 1995) is a Swedish ice hockey goaltender, currently playing in the Swiss Women's Hockey League B (SWHL B) with Lausanne HC Féminin.

She represented Sweden in the women's ice hockey tournament at the 2018 Winter Olympics in PyeongChang.

== Playing career ==
Kovács played her first regular season in the Riksserien (renamed SDHL in 2016) in 2012, as a 17-year-old, with AIK Hockey. The following year, she claimed the starting job as the club won the SDHL championship. She was named Best Goaltender of the Riksserien for the 2015–16 season.

Kovács missed most of 2018–19 season due to pregnancy. In the summer of 2019, she left AIK to sign with Luleå HF/MSSK.

In January 2020, Kovács announced that she was leaving Luleå and joining HC Örnen in the men's Hockeyettan as they competed for promotion to HockeyAllsvenskan. She did not play during the following season, as she was pregnant with her second child.

Kovács made her return to the SDHL for the 2021–22 season, announcing a one-year contract with AIK in April 2021.

She officially retired after the 2021–22 season, explaining that trying to balance playing elite ice hockey and caring for her two young children wasn’t sustainable in a healthy way, particularly since she could not make a living as a player.

After sitting out the 2022–23 regular season, Kovács joined the women's team of Lausanne HC in the SWHL B playoffs and chose to continue with the team in the 2023–24 season.

=== International ===
She was named Best Goaltender at the 2013 IIHF World Women's U18 Championship, as Sweden won bronze.

She competed in the 2018 Winter Olympics.

== Personal life ==
Kovács and her husband, professional ice hockey forward Robin Kovács, have three children – born in October 2018, September 2020, and November 2022.

== Career statistics ==
=== International ===
Note: GP = Games played; Min, TOI = Minutes played; W = Wins; L = Losses; T,T/OT = Ties; OTL = Overtime losses; GA = Goals-against; GAA = Goals-against average; SO = Shutouts; SV% = Save percentage;

				Regular season
Year	Team	Event	Result	GP	W	L	T/OT	MIN	GA	SO	GAA	SV%
2018	Sweden	OG	7th	1	1	0	0	31:11	1	0	1.92	0.875
