= Catholic Kwandong University Gymnasium =

Sports venue in Gangneung, South Korea

Coordinates: 37°44′18″N 128°52′38″E

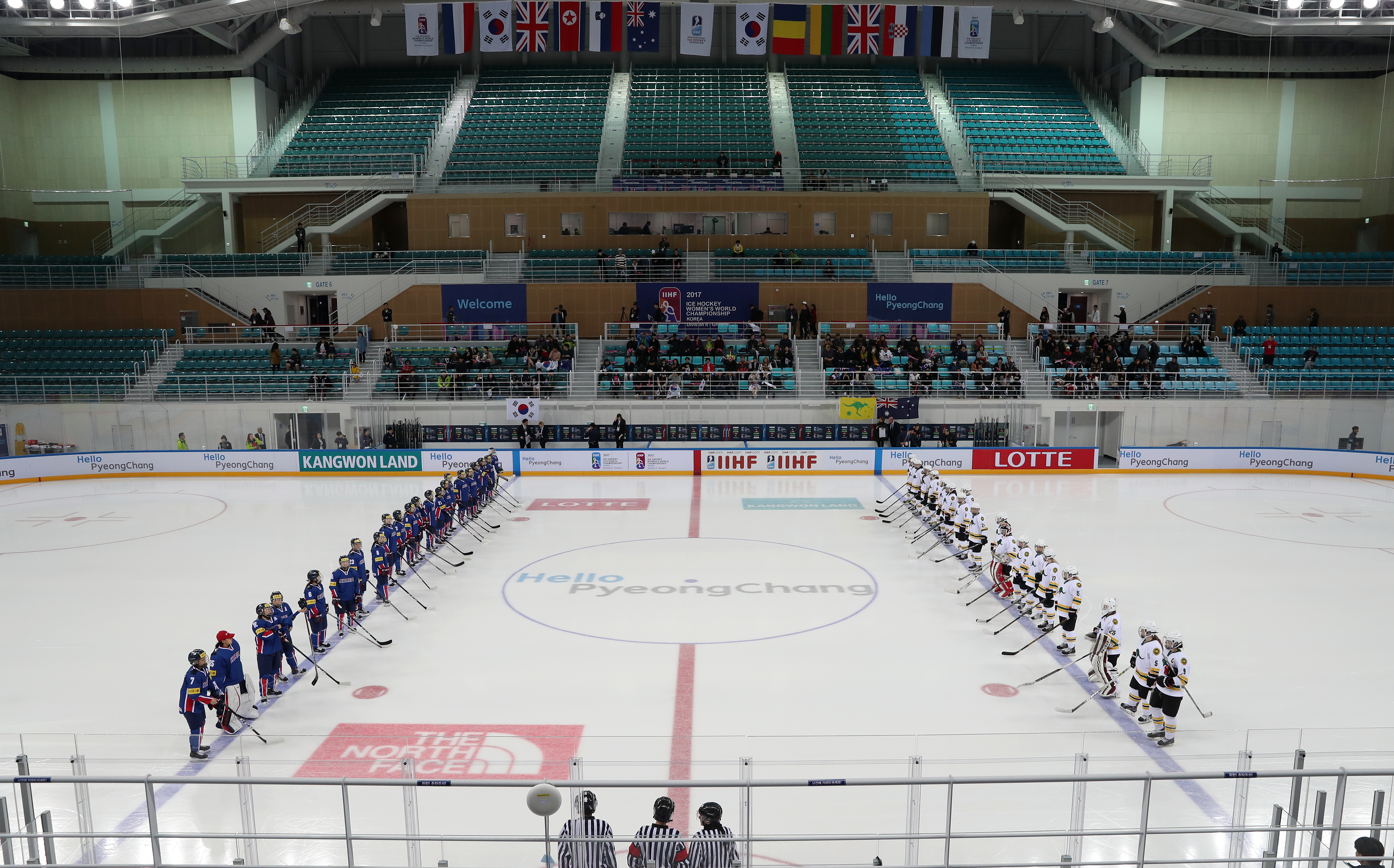
Gymnasium

Catholic Kwandong University Gymnasium is located on the grounds of Catholic Kwandong University in Gangneung, Gangwon-do, South Korea. During the 2018 Winter Olympics, it is one of the two venues for Ice Hockey. The official name as the Winter Olympic venue is Kwandong Hockey Centre (Korean: 관동 하키 센터, romanized: Gwandong Haki Senteo).

For the Winter Olympics, it was rebuilt replacing the former gymnasium of the university. Construction started in June 2014 and was completed in February 2017. The seating capacity is 6,000. There is one Olympic size ice rink (60m x 30m), four floors above ground and one underground level.

After the Winter Olympics, it will be used as a multi-purpose gymnasium of the university.
