= Sarah Berglind =

Swedish ice hockey player (born 1996)

- Born: February 10, 1996 (age 29) Östersund, Sweden
- Height: 5 ft 4 in (163 cm)
- Weight: 141 lb (64 kg; 10 st 1 lb)
- Position: Goaltender
- Caught: Left
- Played for: Modo Hockey
- National team: Sweden
- Playing career: 2012–2018

Sarah Berglind (born February 10, 1996) is a retired Swedish ice hockey goaltender who played for Modo Hockey and the Swedish national team.

== Career ==
Berglind made her SDHL debut at the age of 16 with Modo in 2012. She would then play another 5 seasons with the club. In 2018, she announced she was leaving hockey after her brother died in a workplace accident.

=== International ===
She participated at the 2017 IIHF Women's World Championship. She would then play two games for Sweden at the 2018 Winter Olympics.

== Career statistics ==
=== International ===
Note: GP = Games played; Min, TOI = Minutes played; W = Wins; L = Losses; T,T/OT = Ties; OTL = Overtime losses; GA = Goals-against; GAA = Goals-against average; SO = Shutouts; SV% = Save percentage;

				Regular season
Year	Team	Event	Result	GP	W	L	T/OT	MIN	GA	SO	GAA	SV%
2018	Sweden	OG	7th	2	0	0	0	68:49	4	0	3.49	0.857
