= Randi Griffin =

Korean-American Ice hockey player

Randi Heesoo Griffin 랜디 희수 그리핀
- Born: September 2, 1988 (age 38) Chicago, Illinois, U.S.
- Height: 5 ft 4 in (163 cm)
- Weight: 140 lb (64 kg; 10 st 0 lb)
- Position: Forward
- Shoots: Left
- KWHL team Former teams: Ice Avengers; Harvard University
- National team: South Korea and Korea
- Playing career: 2006–present

Randi Heesoo Griffin (Korean: 랜디 희수 그리핀; born September 2, 1988) is an ice hockey player who competed in the 2018 Winter Olympics as part of the Unified Korea women's national team, scoring its first goal on February 14. In 2018, she was listed as one of BBC's 100 Women.

== Background ==
Griffin was born in the United States to Tom and Liz Griffin. Her mother, Liz, is Korean. Griffin is a native of Apex, North Carolina.

Griffin aspired to compete at the Winter Olympics after she watched women's hockey make a debut at the 1998 Winter Olympics in Nagano, Japan. Her parents decided to let her play ice hockey in Cary, North Carolina and bought her first set of hockey gear.

== Playing career ==
=== NCAA ===
She attended Harvard University and played for the university's women's hockey team. She is a letter winner from 2006 to 2010. Griffin played in 125 career games for Harvard and scored 21 goals and made 18 assists for 39 points. After graduating from Harvard, she became a youth ice hockey coach mentoring boys and girls ages 12 to 19. In 2013, she began pursuing a PhD degree in evolutionary anthropology at Duke University.

=== Korean national team ===
She was contacted by the Korea Ice Hockey Association in 2014. The association was looking for players with Korean heritage who could represent South Korea in the 2018 Winter Olympics. She played in exhibition games against Kazakhstan for South Korea in 2015. In the Olympic tournament, Griffin scored the first of two goals in the entire tournament by the unified Korean team, in the 4–1 defeat to Japan at the group stage (the other being scored by Han Soo-jin in the seventh place match against Sweden).

=== Professional ===
On July 11, 2018 Griffin signed her first professional contract, agreeing to join the NWHL's Connecticut Whale.
