= Han Soo-jin =

South Korean ice hockey player (born 1987)

Han Soo-jin 한수진 (韓修珍)
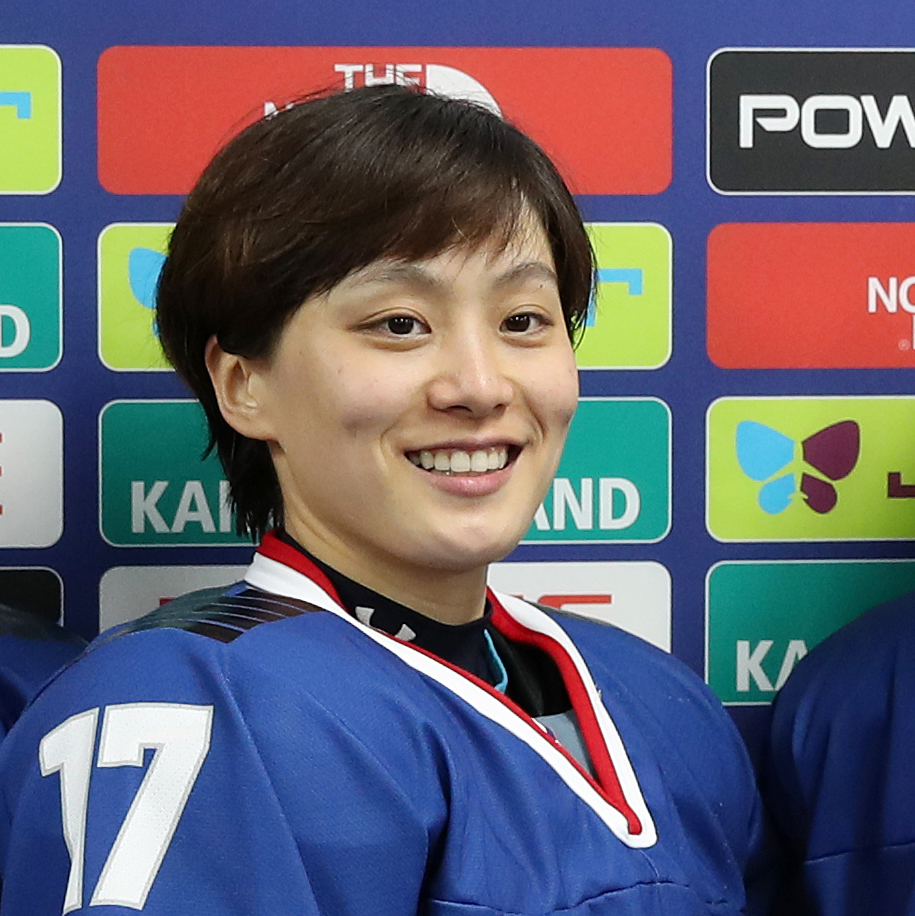
- in 2018
- Born: 22 September 1987 (age 38) South Korea
- Height: 160 cm (5 ft 3 in)
- Weight: 63 kg (139 lb; 9 st 13 lb)
- Position: Forward
- Shoots: Right
- KWHL team: Ice Beat
- National team: South Korea and Korea
- Playing career: 2008–present

Han Soo-jin (Korean: 한수진; born 22 September 1987) is a South Korean ice hockey player currently playing in the Korean Women's Hockey League with the Suwon City Hall women's ice hockey team. She competed for the Unified Korea women's national team in the 2018 Winter Olympics. She scored a power play goal in a 6–1 loss against Sweden on February 20, which was the second of the team's two goals in the tournament.

Before joining the Korean national ice hockey team, she graduated from Yewon Middle School and the Seoul Arts High School, and then entered the College of Music at Yonsei University to pursue a career as a classical pianist. However, she gave up piano after realizing that her true passion was for ice hockey.
