= Shoko Ono =

Japanese ice hockey player (born 1981)

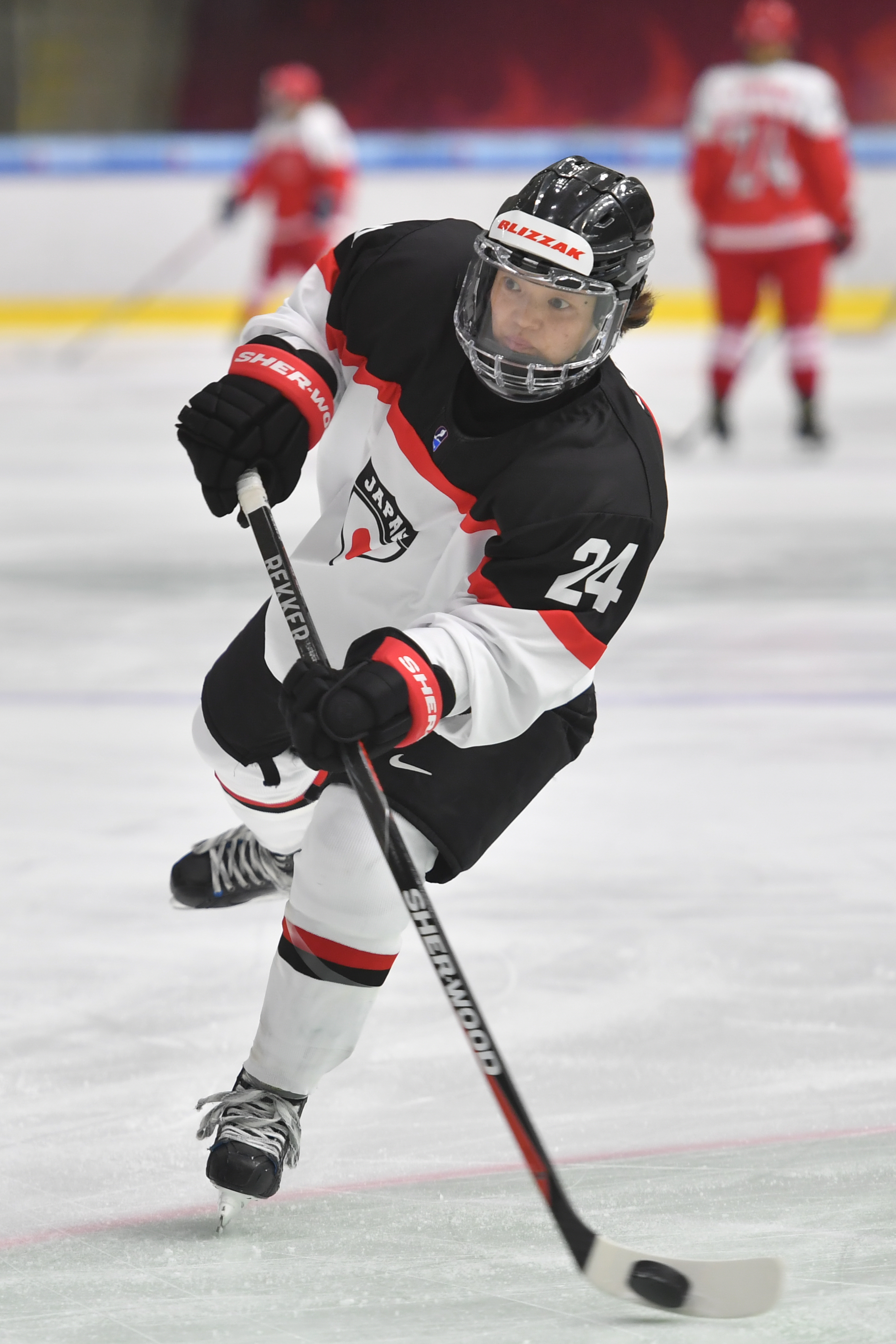
- Born: September 5, 1981 (age 44) Japan
- Height: 5 ft 2 in (157 cm)
- Weight: 128 lb (58 kg; 9 st 2 lb)
- Position: Forward
- Shoots: Left
- JWIHL team: Mikage Gretz
- National team: Japan
- Playing career: 2015–present

Shoko Ono (小野 粧子, Ono Shōko; born September 5, 1981) is a Japanese ice hockey player for Mikage Gretz and the Japanese national team. She participated at the 2016 IIHF Women's World Championship.

Ono competed at the 2018 Winter Olympics.
