= Elin Lundberg =

Swedish ice hockey player (born 1993)

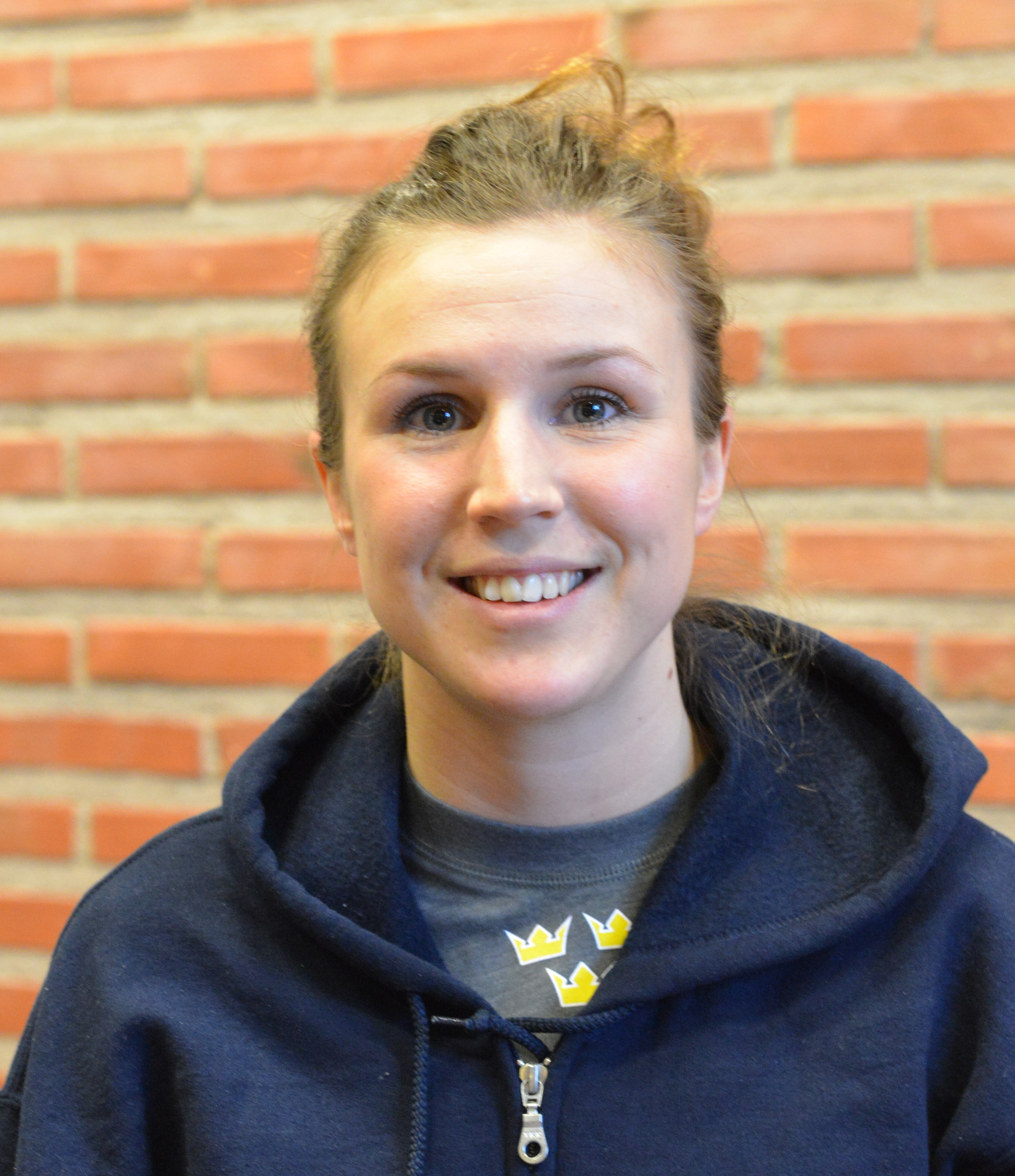
- Lundberg in 2016
- Born: 15 May 1993 (age 33) Malung, Sweden
- Height: 163 cm (5 ft 4 in)
- Weight: 68 kg (150 lb; 10 st 10 lb)
- Position: Defense
- Shoots: Left
- Played for: Leksands IF
- National team: Sweden
- Playing career: 2007–present

Elin Lundberg (born 15 May 1993) is a Swedish ice hockey player. She competed in the 2018 Winter Olympics.
