= Annie Svedin =

Swedish ice hockey player

- Born: 12 October 1991 (age 34) Sundsvall, Sweden
- Height: 5 ft 4 in (163 cm)
- Weight: 152 lb (69 kg; 10 st 12 lb)
- Position: Defence
- Shoots: Left
- SWHL team Former teams: Modo Hockey; IF Sundsvall Hockey; Ohio State Buckeyes; Timrå IK
- National team: Sweden
- Playing career: 2004–present

Annie Svedin (born 12 October 1991) is a Swedish ice hockey player for IF Sundsvall Hockey and the Swedish national team. She participated at the 2015 IIHF Women's World Championship.
