= Ice hockey at the 2017 Asian Winter Games – Women's tournament =

Women at the 2017 Asian Winter Games
- Venue: Tsukisamu Gymnasium
- Date: 18–25 February 2017
- Competitors: 124 from 6 nations

Medalists
gold medal	Japan
silver medal	China
bronze medal	Kazakhstan

The women's Ice hockey tournament at the 2017 Asian Winter Games was held in Sapporo, Japan, between 18 and 25 February at the Tsukisamu Gymnasium.

A total of 6 women's teams participated. In the women's ranking, Japan were the highest rated team in women's ice hockey, followed by China, Kazakhstan and South Korea and Hong Kong. Thailand was unranked.

== Squads ==
China	Hong Kong	Japan	Kazakhstan
He Siye; Yu Baiwei; Zhu Rui; Tian Naiyuan; Liu Zhixin; Zhang Mengying; Deng Di; Zhang Chi; Ju Jingwen; Lu Shuang; Wang Chang; Zhao Qinan; Guan Yingying; Kong Minghui; Jiang Bowen; Lü Yue; Wen Lu; He Xin; Jiang Yue; Fang Xin; Wang Yuqing	Virginia Wong; Chow Suet Yee; Chow Wai Yee; Joanna Chan; Chloe Chan; Queenie Chan; Lau Yeuk Ting; Claudia Ieong; Kwok Hoi Kei; Cheung Oi Lam; Adrienne Li; Aman Leung; Brittany Ng; Wong Tsui Yi; Jacqueline Ng; Kwan Yim Kuen; Cindy Chu; Maureen Wong; Chau Nga Sze; Joey Lin; Monica Shum	Nana Fujimoto; Shiori Koike; Ayaka Toko; Sena Suzuki; Mika Hori; Akane Hosoyamada; Aina Takeuchi; Haruna Yoneyama; Yurie Adachi; Chiho Osawa; Moeko Fujimoto; Haruka Toko; Rui Ukita; Naho Terashima; Hanae Kubo; Tomomi Iwahara; Ami Nakamura; Yoshino Enomoto; Shoko Ono; Mai Kondo; Akane Konishi	Aizhan Raushanova; Madina Tursynova; Pernesh Ashimova; Malika Aldabergenova; Azhar Khamimuldinova; Bulbul Kartanbayeva; Alena Fux; Aray Shegebayeva; Zarina Tukhtiyeva; Meruyert Ryspek; Tatyana Likhaus; Anastassiya Orlova; Galiya Nurgaliyeva; Olga Konysheva; Alexandra Feklistova; Karina Felzink; Darya Dmitriyeva; Viktoriya Sazonova; Aida Olzhabayeva; Tatyana Koroleva; Arina Chshyokolova
South Korea	Thailand		
Ko Hye-in; Eom Su-yeon; Caroline Park; Choi Yu-jung; Lee Kyou-sun; Kim Se-lin; Park Jong-ah; Choi Ji-yeon; Park Ye-eun; Kim Hee-won; Lee Eun-ji; Park Chae-lin; Jo Su-sie; Han Soo-jin; Lee Min-ji; Han Do-hee; Lee Yeon-jeong; Jung Si-yun; Cho Mi-hwan; Shin So-jung	Wasunun Angkulpattanasuk; Pimnapa Pungpapong; Nuchanat Ponglerkdee; Kwanchanok Choeiklang; Pijittra Saejear; Fongfon Sukontanit; Rungrawee Sakulsurarat; Panvipa Suksirivecharuk; Kritsana Promdirat; Minsasha Teekhathanasakul; Thanravee Surasirirattanasin; Siriwan Kaewkitinarong; Jaravee Srichamnong; Varachanant Boonyubol; Nion Putsuk; Siriluck Kaewkitinarong; Wirasinee Rattananai; Wichaya Phangnga; Sirikarn Jittresin; Pawadee Keratichewanun		

== Results ==
All times are Japan Standard Time (UTC+09:00)

Pos	Team	Pld	W	OW	OL	L	GF	GA	GD	Pts
1	Japan	5	5	0	0	0	98	1	+97	15
2	China	5	3	0	1	1	46	12	+34	10
3	Kazakhstan	5	3	0	0	2	31	14	+17	9
4	South Korea	5	2	1	0	2	37	6	+31	8
5	Thailand	5	1	0	0	4	5	84	−79	3
6	Hong Kong	5	0	0	0	5	4	104	−100	0

Source: IIHF

18 February; 12:00	Kazakhstan	0–6 (0–2, 0–3, 0–1)	Japan	Tsukisamu Gymnasium, Sapporo; Attendance: 2,200

Game reference

Darya Dmitriyeva
Goalies
Nana Fujimoto
Referee:
Tijana Haack (GER)

0–1	06:53 – Nakamura (H. Toko, Kubo) (PP)
0–2	19:32 – Osawa (Hosoyamada) (PP)
0–3	22:22 – Ono (Enomoto, Adachi)
0–4	33:52 – Osawa (Yoneyama) (SH)
0–5	38:25 – Ukita (Adachi, Kubo)
0–6	58:59 – Nakamura (Ukita) (PP)

12 min
Penalties
4 min
3
Shots
58

18 February; 15:30	Thailand	0–20 (0–7, 0–7, 0–6)	South Korea	Tsukisamu Gymnasium, Sapporo; Attendance: 360

Game reference

Wasunun Angkulpattanasuk
Wichaya Phangnga
Goalies
Shin So-jung
Han Do-hee
Referee:
Deana Cuglietta (GBR)

0–1	03:36 – Park J. (Han S.) (PP)
0–2	06:23 – Park J. (Han S.)
0–3	08:20 – Park J. (Jo)
0–4	11:04 – Lee E. (C. Park, Park J.)
0–5	11:33 – Park C.L. (Han S.)
0–6	15:04 – Jo (Choi Y., Eom) (SH)
0–7	17:56 – Park C.L.
0–8	24:57 – C. Park (Lee E.)
0–9	28:45 – Park J.
0–10	31:43 – Park J. (Park C.L., Jo)
0–11	34:14 – Eom
0–12	35:01 – Han S.
0–13	36:14 – Eom
0–14	38:27 – Kim H. (Han S.)
0–15	41:50 – Kim H. (Choi J., Cho)
0–16	42:42 – Lee Y.
0–17	42:56 – Jung (Ko, Park C.L.)
0–18	46:53 – Ko (Jung, Park J.)
0–19	51:55 – Lee M. (Ko, Kim S.)
0–20	56:26 – Jo (Choi Y.)

4 min
Penalties
4 min
1
Shots
108

18 February; 19:00	China	20–0 (4–0, 8–0, 8–0)	Hong Kong	Tsukisamu Gymnasium, Sapporo; Attendance: 110

Game reference

Wang Yuqing
He Siye
Goalies
Virginia Wong
Chau Nga Sze
Referee:
Anna Kuroda (JPN)

Zhang M. (Yu) – 03:04	1–0
Lu (Zhang M., Deng) – 03:47	2–0
Guan (Jiang B., Wen) – 05:05	3–0
Zhang M. (He X.) – 14:02	4–0
Ju (Zhu, Deng) – 21:41	5–0
He X. (Kong) – 22:21	6–0
Yu (Lu) – 22:42	7–0
Liu (He X.) – 32:52	8–0
He X. (Zhang M., Liu) – 33:54	9–0
Zhang M. (Yu) – 35:55	10–0
Lu (Fang) – 36:37	11–0
Zhang M. (Kong, Yu) – 37:17	12–0
Zhao – 43:45	13–0
Kong – 44:35	14–0
Zhang M. (Kong) – 44:49	15–0
Fang (Lu, Zhao) – 44:59	16–0
Zhao (Tian) – 45:20	17–0
Lü (Guan, Wang C.) – 50:06	18–0
Fang (Lu, Wen) – 51:54	19–0
Zhang M. (SH) – 56:02	20–0

6 min
Penalties
2 min
78
Shots
3

20 February; 12:00	Hong Kong	4–5 (2–2, 1–1, 1–2)	Thailand	Tsukisamu Gymnasium, Sapporo; Attendance: 261

Game reference

Virginia Wong
Goalies
Wasunun Angkulpattanasuk
Referee:
Anna Kuroda (JPN)

J. Ng (Wong T., Li) – 03:17	1–0
	1–1	05:34 – Teekhathanasakul (Ponglerkdee) (SH)
	1–2	11:16 – Teekhathanasakul (Ponglerkdee)
Li (Wong T.) – 18:14	2–2
	2–3	20:35 – Ponglerkdee (Teekhathanasakul) (PP)
Wong T. – 21:58	3–3
Wong T. (J. Ng, Li) (PP) – 46:20	4–3
	4–4	49:00 – Pungpapong
	4–5	58:26 – Ponglerkdee

6 min
Penalties
4 min
28
Shots
30

20 February; 15:30	China	8–3 (2–1, 3–1, 3–1)	Kazakhstan	Tsukisamu Gymnasium, Sapporo; Attendance: 323

Game reference

Wang Yuqing
Goalies
Darya Dmitriyeva
Aizhan Raushanova
Referee:
Deana Cuglietta (GBR)

	0–1	07:23 – Ryspek (Tukhtiyeva)
Liu (Yu) – 11:37	1–1
Fang (Zhao) – 12:28	2–1
Guan (Liu, Yu) – 23:52	3–1
Lu (Fang, Tian) – 25:12	4–1
	4–2	31:48 – Tukhtiyeva (Khamimuldinova, Fux) (PP)
Kong (Fang, Zhang M.) (PP) – 39:30	5–2
	5–3	48:12 – Ryspek
Zhang M. (Kong) – 48:40	6–3
Zhang M. – 54:06	7–3
Fang (Lu, Wang C.) – 59:08	8–3

6 min
Penalties
10 min
39
Shots
21

20 February; 19:00	Japan	3–0 (1–0, 0–0, 2–0)	South Korea	Tsukisamu Gymnasium, Sapporo; Attendance: 1,221

Game reference

Nana Fujimoto
Goalies
Shin So-jung
Referee:
Kaisa Ketonen (FIN)

Kubo (Adachi) – 01:52	1–0
Terashima (H. Toko) (SH) – 43:30	2–0
Ono (Osawa) (PP) – 53:22	3–0

12 min
Penalties
6 min
47
Shots
19

21 February; 12:00	China	15–0 (7–0, 4–0, 4–0)	Thailand	Tsukisamu Gymnasium, Sapporo; Attendance: 184

Game reference

Wang Yuqing
He Siye
Goalies
Wasunun Angkulpattanasuk
Wichaya Phangnga
Referee:
Kaisa Ketonen (FIN)

Zhang C. (Zhu) – 02:51	1–0
Guan (Lü, Wang C.) – 04:15	2–0
Ju (Zhang C.) – 04:31	3–0
He X. (Zhang M.) – 04:49	4–0
Lü (Zhao) – 06:16	5–0
Liu (Yu, Zhang M.) – 07:28	6–0
Guan (Wang C.) – 17:14	7–0
Yu – 22:29	8–0
Zhang M. (Kong) (SH) – 31:34	9–0
Fang – 36:53	10–0
Zhang C. (Zhu) – 39:14	11–0
Fang (Lu) – 41:28	12–0
Wang C. – 45:53	13–0
Lu (Zhao) – 50:54	14–0
Fang (Lu) – 51:08	15–0

2 min
Penalties
4 min
74
Shots
3

21 February; 15:30	Kazakhstan	1–0 (0–0, 0–0, 1–0)	South Korea	Tsukisamu Gymnasium, Sapporo; Attendance: 292

Game reference
Darya Dmitriyeva	Goalies	Shin So-jung	Referee: Tijana Haack (GER)
Khamimuldinova (Shegebayeva, Kartanbayeva) – 41:41 / 1–0			Referee: Tijana Haack (GER)
10 min	Penalties	2 min	Referee: Tijana Haack (GER)
21	Shots	30	Referee: Tijana Haack (GER)

21 February; 19:00	Japan	46–0 (17–0, 18–0, 11–0)	Hong Kong	Tsukisamu Gymnasium, Sapporo; Attendance: 513

Game reference

Akane Konishi
Goalies
Chau Nga Sze
Virginia Wong
Referee:
Deana Cuglietta (GBR)

Nakamura (Adachi) – 00:33	1–0
H. Toko (Kubo, Ukita) – 01:20	2–0
Nakamura (Adachi, Ono) – 04:04	3–0
Nakamura (Terashima) – 04:39	4–0
Terashima (A. Toko, Nakamura) – 05:03	5–0
Ukita – 05:10	6–0
H. Toko (Ukita, Kubo) – 05:37	7–0
Ono (Adachi, Nakamura) – 05:46	8–0
Yoneyama (M. Fujimoto, Osawa) – 06:28	9–0
Terashima (Adachi, Suzuki) – 10:44	10–0
Ono (Hosoyamada) – 12:28	11–0
Osawa (M. Fujimoto, Hori) – 13:00	12–0
Kubo (H. Toko, Takeuchi) – 14:51	13–0
Nakamura (Adachi) – 15:14	14–0
H. Toko (Kubo) – 17:30	15–0
Adachi (Nakamura) – 17:56	16–0
Koike (Yoneyama) – 19:03	17–0
Ono (Adachi, Nakamura) – 20:29	18–0
Osawa (Enomoto, Terashima) – 22:33	19–0
Ono (Adachi, Nakamura) – 23:14	20–0
Osawa – 23:23	21–0
Nakamura (Suzuki, Hori) – 25:10	22–0
Osawa (M. Fujimoto, Koike) – 25:50	23–0
Ukita (H. Toko, Kubo) – 26:05	24–0
Hosoyamada (Koike, Yoneyama) (PP) – 26:56	25–0
Nakamura (Adachi, A. Toko) – 28:04	26–0
H. Toko (Ukita, Kubo) – 29:23	27–0
Nakamura (Hosoyamada, Ono) – 30:17	28–0
Yoneyama (Takeuchi, Osawa) – 30:32	29–0
Kubo (A. Toko) – 32:07	30–0
Terashima – 32:22	31–0
Yoneyama (A. Toko, Koike) – 34:01	32–0
Ukita (H. Toko) – 34:11	33–0
Ukita (H. Toko) – 34:19	34–0
Osawa (Enomoto) – 38:24	35–0
M. Fujimoto (Yoneyama) – 40:26	36–0
Enomoto (Ukita, Suzuki) – 41:44	37–0
Ono (Adachi, Hori) – 44:01	38–0
Enomoto (A. Toko, Koike) – 44:26	39–0
Kubo (Ukita, H. Toko) – 45:17	40–0
Yoneyama (Osawa, M. Fujimoto) – 48:53	41–0
A. Toko (Kubo) – 49:33	42–0
Nakamura (Adachi, Ono) – 50:23	43–0
Ukita (H. Toko, Takeuchi) – 52:54	44–0
Ono (Adachi, Nakamura) – 53:23	45–0
Suzuki (Kubo) – 58:11	46–0

0 min
Penalties
2 min
158
Shots
0

23 February; 12:00	South Korea	3–2 GWS (1–1, 1–1, 0–0) (OT: 0–0) (SO: 1–0)	China	Tsukisamu Gymnasium, Sapporo; Attendance: 351

Game reference

Shin So-jung
Goalies
Wang Yuqing
Referee:
Anna Kuroda (JPN)

	0–1	10:36 – Yu (Zhao) (PP)
Park J. (Park C.L.) (SH) – 19:27	1–1
	1–2	22:18 – Kong
C. Park (Lee E., Park J.) – 37:03	2–2

Choi J. (miss)
Park J.
C. Park (miss)
Park J. (miss)
Kim H. (miss)
Choi J. (miss)
Han S. (miss)
Park J. (miss)
Eom (miss)
Park J.
Shootout
(miss) Fang
Kong
(miss) Zhang M.
(miss) Wen
(miss) Zhang M.
(miss) Yu
(miss) Fang
(miss) Wen
(miss) Zhang M.
(miss) Kong
10 min
Penalties
8 min
25
Shots
29

23 February; 15:30	Hong Kong	0–19 (0–7, 0–5, 0–7)	Kazakhstan	Tsukisamu Gymnasium, Sapporo; Attendance: 182

Game reference

Virginia Wong
Chau Nga Sze
Goalies
Arina Chshyokolova
Referee:
Kaisa Ketonen (FIN)

0–1	01:11 – Aldabergenova (Konysheva, Felzink)
0–2	09:38 – Khamimuldinova
0–3	12:04 – Konysheva (Kartanbayeva)
0–4	14:45 – Fux (Ryspek)
0–5	16:11 – Felzink (Aldabergenova)
0–6	18:17 – Ryspek (Orlova)
0–7	18:31 – Orlova (Ryspek)
0–8	26:06 – Koroleva (Aldabergenova) (SH)
0–9	27:30 – Aldabergenova (Koroleva, Nurgaliyeva) (SH)
0–10	30:56 – Fux (Orlova)
0–11	36:06 – Koroleva (Khamimuldinova) (SH)
0–12	38:33 – Orlova (Fux)
0–13	41:23 – Aldabergenova (Koroleva, Konysheva)
0–14	45:56 – Koroleva (Aldabergenova, Khamimuldinova)
0–15	46:54 – Kartanbayeva (Feklistova)
0–16	53:28 – Kartanbayeva (Feklistova)
0–17	54:14 – Ryspek (Fux)
0–18	57:39 – Konysheva (Orlova, Fux)
0–19	59:04 – Koroleva (Felzink)

0 min
Penalties
8 min
2
Shots
72

23 February; 19:00	Thailand	0–37 (0–18, 0–13, 0–6)	Japan	Tsukisamu Gymnasium, Sapporo; Attendance: 348

Game reference

Wichaya Phangnga
Wasunun Angkulpattanasuk
Goalies
Mai Kondo
Referee:
Tijana Haack (GER)

0–1	00:52 – Adachi (Nakamura)
0–2	02:11 – Osawa (Koike, Nakamura)
0–3	02:45 – Terashima (Nakamura)
0–4	02:51 – H. Toko
0–5	04:08 – Nakamura (Adachi)
0–6	05:29 – Yoneyama
0–7	07:38 – Hori (Kubo)
0–8	08:20 – Ono (Adachi, Nakamura)
0–9	10:27 – Terashima
0–10	10:51 – Kubo (H. Toko, A. Toko)
0–11	12:31 – Yoneyama (M. Fujimoto, Osawa)
0–12	14:05 – H. Toko (Ukita, Kubo)
0–13	14:27 – Kubo (H. Toko)
0–14	15:18 – Yoneyama (Osawa, A. Toko)
0–15	15:39 – Enomoto (Adachi)
0–16	15:45 – Ukita (H. Toko)
0–17	16:21 – Kubo (H. Toko)
0–18	17:28 – Yoneyama (M. Fujimoto, A. Toko)
0–19	22:32 – Kubo (H. Toko, Ukita)
0–20	22:49 – Enomoto (Terashima)
0–21	24:20 – Adachi (Nakamura, Hori)
0–22	25:26 – Ukita (H. Toko, Kubo)
0–23	26:46 – Adachi
0–24	27:22 – H. Toko
0–25	27:38 – Ukita (Kubo)
0–26	28:31 – Nakamura (Adachi)
0–27	30:29 – H. Toko
0–28	31:22 – M. Fujimoto (Terashima, Enomoto)
0–29	36:07 – Nakamura (Kubo, Ukita) (PP)
0–30	36:27 – Osawa (Yoneyama, M. Fujimoto)
0–31	39:12 – Hosoyamada (Ono, Osawa) (PP)
0–32	49:50 – Ukita (Kubo)
0–33	50:00 – Adachi (Nakamura)
0–34	55:04 – Enomoto (Ukita)
0–35	57:02 – H. Toko (Kubo, Ukita)
0–36	57:37 – Kubo (H. Toko, Ukita)
0–37	59:40 – Kubo (H. Toko, Nakamura) (PP)

10 min
Penalties
0 min
0
Shots
150

25 February; 12:00	Kazakhstan	8–0 (5–0, 2–0, 1–0)	Thailand	Tsukisamu Gymnasium, Sapporo; Attendance: 337

Game reference

Arina Chshyokolova
Goalies
Wasunun Angkulpattanasuk
Referee:
Deana Cuglietta (GBR)

Ryspek (Fux, Feklistova) – 06:36	1–0
Likhaus – 11:53	2–0
Orlova – 13:30	3–0
Aldabergenova (Ashimova, Koroleva) – 16:34	4–0
Nurgaliyeva (Orlova, Ryspek) – 19:41	5–0
Ashimova (Koroleva) – 24:57	6–0
Kartanbayeva (Shegebayeva) – 26:55	7–0
Ryspek (Orlova, Koroleva) – 46:55	8–0

0 min
Penalties
6 min
75
Shots
0

25 February; 15:30	South Korea	14–0 (9–0, 5–0, 0–0)	Hong Kong	Tsukisamu Gymnasium, Sapporo; Attendance: 508

Game reference

Shin So-jung
Han Do-hee
Goalies
Chau Nga Sze
Virginia Wong
Referee:
Kaisa Ketonen (FIN)

C. Park (Park J., Lee E.) – 00:10	1–0
Lee M. (Jung, Ko) – 02:10	2–0
Choi J. (Han S.) – 03:46	3–0
Kim S. (Jung) – 05:08	4–0
Jung (Eom, Park C.L.) – 08:21	5–0
Lee Y. (Jo, Choi Y.) – 09:16	6–0
Ko (Lee M.) – 11:50	7–0
Lee E. (Eom) – 13:00	8–0
Choi J. (Han S., Kim H.) – 13:51	9–0
Park Y. (Kim H.) – 25:24	10–0
Kim H. (Choi J., Han S.) – 26:14	11–0
Kim H. (Park C.L., Han S.) – 34:30	12–0
Lee Y. (Park Y., Jo) – 35:47	13–0
Kim S. (Park Y.) – 37:15	14–0

6 min
Penalties
4 min
59
Shots
0

25 February; 19:00	Japan	6–1 (5–0, 0–1, 1–0)	China	Tsukisamu Gymnasium, Sapporo; Attendance: 1,807

Game reference

Nana Fujimoto
Goalies
Wang Yuqing
He Siye
Referee:
Tijana Haack (GER)

Kubo (A. Toko, H. Toko) – 08:48	1–0
Terashima (M. Fujimoto, Enomoto) – 11:51	2–0
Adachi (Nakamura, Ono) – 13:19	3–0
Takeuchi (Ukita) – 15:09	4–0
Ukita – 19:47	5–0
	5–1	26:26 – Fang (Yu, Kong) (PP)
Kubo (H. Toko, Ukita) – 41:10	6–1

4 min
Penalties
8 min
70
Shots
3

== Final standing ==
Rank	Team	Pld	W	OW	OL	L
1st place, gold medalist(s)	Japan	5	5	0	0	0
2nd place, silver medalist(s)	China	5	3	0	1	1
3rd place, bronze medalist(s)	Kazakhstan	5	3	0	0	2
4	South Korea	5	2	1	0	2
5	Thailand	5	1	0	0	4
6	Hong Kong	5	0	0	0	5
