= 2014 Women's Ice Hockey World Championships =

Tournament details
- Host countries: Czech Republic; Latvia; Italy; Iceland; Mexico
- Venues: 5 (in 5 host cities)
- Teams: 28

The 2014 Women's World Ice Hockey Championships were the 17th such series of tournaments organized by the International Ice Hockey Federation (IIHF). This was the first time that the women's tournaments were played in an Olympic year. The IIHF determined that the best way to continue advancing the competitive level of nations not invited to the Olympic tournament was to fund participation every year. No Top Division tournament was played, and initially the IIHF stated that the last-placed Olympic participant would be relegated to be replaced by the Division I Group A winner. However after discussion it was changed so that the two teams in question played best of three series instead of simply swapping places.

== Top Division playoff ==
The last-placed team of the 2014 Olympics faced the winner of the 2014 Division I A tournament in a best-of-three series. The winners, Japan, were promoted to the 2015 Top Division. The event took place in Yokohama, Japan, from 8 to 11 November 2014.

All times are local (Japan Standard Time – UTC+9)

8 November 2014; 14:00	Japan	2–0 (0–0, 1–0, 1–0)	Czech Republic	Yokohama Arena, Yokohama; Attendance: 821

Game reference
Nana Fujimoto	Goalies	Klára Peslarová	Referee: (United Kingdom) Joy Tottman; Linesmen: (United States) Jamie Fenstermacher (Canada) Danielle McGurry
Terashima (Ukita) – 27:06 / 1–0; Koike (Kubo, Hirano) (PP) – 53:54 / 2–0			Referee: (United Kingdom) Joy Tottman; Linesmen: (United States) Jamie Fenstermacher (Canada) Danielle McGurry
8 min	Penalties	10 min	Referee: (United Kingdom) Joy Tottman; Linesmen: (United States) Jamie Fenstermacher (Canada) Danielle McGurry
20	Shots	28	Referee: (United Kingdom) Joy Tottman; Linesmen: (United States) Jamie Fenstermacher (Canada) Danielle McGurry

9 November 2014; 14:00	Czech Republic	2–0 (0–0, 1–0, 1–0)	Japan	Yokohama Arena, Yokohama; Attendance: 975

Game reference
Klára Peslarová	Goalies	Nana Fujimoto	Referee: (Norway) Aina Hove; Linesmen: (United States) Jamie Fenstermacher (South Korea) Lee Tae-ri
Polenská (Bukolská) – 35:14 / 1–0; Křížová (Mrázová) – 49:20 / 2–0			Referee: (Norway) Aina Hove; Linesmen: (United States) Jamie Fenstermacher (South Korea) Lee Tae-ri
4 min	Penalties	6 min	Referee: (Norway) Aina Hove; Linesmen: (United States) Jamie Fenstermacher (South Korea) Lee Tae-ri
22	Shots	17	Referee: (Norway) Aina Hove; Linesmen: (United States) Jamie Fenstermacher (South Korea) Lee Tae-ri

11 November 2014; 19:00	Japan	2–1 (1–0, 0–0, 1–1)	Czech Republic	Yokohama Arena, Yokohama; Attendance: 868

Game reference

Nana Fujimoto
Goalies
Klára Peslarová
Referee:
(United Kingdom) Joy Tottman
Linesmen:
(South Korea) Lee Tae-ri
(Canada) Danielle McGurry

Fujimoto (Yoneyama, Osawa) – 18:22	1–0
Nakamura (Takeuchi) – 48:51	2–0
	2–1	Vanišová – 51:40

4 min
Penalties
10 min
21
Shots
14

== Division I ==
=== Division I Group A ===
The Division I Group A tournament was played in Přerov, Czech Republic, from 6 to 12 April 2014.

Pos	Team	Pld	W	OTW	OTL	L	GF	GA	GD	Pts	Qualification or relegation
1	Czech Republic (H)	5	5	0	0	0	15	3	+12	15	Qualified for the 2015 Top Division playoff
2	Norway	5	3	0	0	2	17	12	+5	9	
3	Denmark	5	2	1	0	2	17	18	−1	8	
4	France	5	2	0	0	3	12	15	−3	6	
5	Austria	5	1	1	1	2	16	19	−3	6	
6	Slovakia	5	0	0	1	4	11	21	−10	1	Relegated to the 2015 Division I B

Source: IIHF
(H) Host

=== Division I Group B ===
The Division I Group B tournament was played in Ventspils, Latvia, from 6 to 12 April 2014.

Pos	Team	Pld	W	OTW	OTL	L	GF	GA	GD	Pts	Promotion or relegation
1	Latvia (H)	5	5	0	0	0	17	3	+14	15	Promoted to the 2015 Division I A
2	China	5	3	0	0	2	10	15	−5	9	
3	Hungary	5	2	1	0	2	13	13	0	8	
4	Netherlands	5	2	1	0	2	16	10	+6	8	
5	North Korea	5	1	0	0	4	10	17	−7	3	
6	Kazakhstan	5	0	0	2	3	5	13	−8	2	Relegated to the 2015 Division II A

Source: IIHF
(H) Host

== Division II ==
=== Division II Group A ===
The Division II Group A tournament was played in Asiago, Italy, from 6 to 12 April 2014.

Pos	Team	Pld	W	OTW	OTL	L	GF	GA	GD	Pts	Promotion or relegation
1	Italy (H)	5	4	1	0	0	20	5	+15	14	Promoted to the 2015 Division I B
2	Great Britain	5	3	0	1	1	12	8	+4	10	
3	South Korea	5	1	2	0	2	9	10	−1	7	
4	Poland	5	2	0	1	2	18	18	0	7	
5	New Zealand	5	1	0	1	3	7	15	−8	4	
6	Australia	5	1	0	0	4	13	23	−10	3	Relegated to the 2015 Division II B

Source: IIHF
(H) Host

=== Division II Group B ===
The Division II Group B tournament was played in Reykjavík, Iceland, from 24 to 30 March 2014.

Pos	Team	Pld	W	OTW	OTL	L	GF	GA	GD	Pts	Promotion or relegation
1	Croatia	5	5	0	0	0	26	8	+18	15	Promoted to the 2015 Division II A
2	Slovenia	5	4	0	0	1	24	9	+15	12	
3	Spain	5	3	0	0	2	22	15	+7	9	
4	Iceland (H)	5	2	0	0	3	8	14	−6	6	
5	Belgium	5	0	1	0	4	3	21	−18	2	
6	Turkey	5	0	0	1	4	8	24	−16	1	Relegated to the 2015 Division II B Qualification

Source: IIHF
(H) Host

=== Division II Group B Qualification ===
The Division II Group B Qualification tournament was played in Mexico City, Mexico, from 19 to 22 March 2014.

Pos	Team	Pld	W	OTW	OTL	L	GF	GA	GD	Pts	Promotion
1	Mexico (H)	3	3	0	0	0	18	2	+16	9	Promoted to the 2015 Division II B
2	South Africa	3	1	1	0	1	7	8	−1	5	
3	Bulgaria	3	1	0	1	1	7	16	−9	4	
4	Hong Kong	3	0	0	0	3	4	10	−6	0	

Source: IIHF
(H) Host
