= 2015 IIHF Women's World Championship Division II =

Tournament details
- Host countries: Great Britain; Spain; Hong Kong
- Venues: 3 (in 3 host cities)
- Dates: 30 March – 5 April 2015; 7–13 March 2015; 18–21 February 2015
- Teams: 16

The 2015 IIHF Women's World Championship Division II consisted of three international ice hockey tournaments organized by the International Ice Hockey Federation. Division II A, Division II B and Division II B Qualification represent the fourth, fifth and sixth tier of the IIHF Women's World Championship.

== Venues ==
Division II Group A	Division II Group B	Division II Group B Qualification
Dumfries	Jaca	Hong Kong
Dumfries Ice Bowl; Capacity: 1,000	Pabellón de Hielo; Capacity: 3,579	Hong Kong Mega Ice

== Division II Group A ==
2015 IIHF Women's World Championship Division II A
Tournament details
- Host country: Great Britain
- Venue: 1 (in 1 host city)
- Dates: 30 March – 5 April 2015
- Teams: 6

Tournament statistics
- Games played: 15
- Goals scored: 105 (7 per game)
- Attendance: 4,819 (321 per game)
- Scoring leader: (Kazakhstan) Alyona Fux (14 points)

The Division II Group A tournament was played in Dumfries, Great Britain, from 30 March to 5 April 2015.

=== Participating teams ===
Team	Qualification
Kazakhstan	Placed 6th in Division I B last year and were relegated.
Great Britain	Hosts; placed 2nd in Division II A last year.
South Korea	Placed 3rd in Division II A last year.
Poland	Placed 4th in Division II A last year.
New Zealand	Placed 5th in Division II A last year.
Croatia	Placed 1st in Division II B last year and were promoted.

=== Match officials ===
4 referees and 7 linesman were selected for the tournament.

Referees

- (United States) Kristine Morrison
- (Czech Republic) Radka Růžičková
- (Japan) Kyoko Ugajin
- (Russia) Yana Zuyeva

Linesman

- (Germany) Melanie Bauer
- (Sweden) Stephanie Cole
- (Belgium) Marine Dinant
- (Norway) Elise Hauan
- (United Kingdom) Leigh Hetherington
- (Finland) Jenni Jaatinen
- (Slovakia) Tatiana Kasášová
- (United Kingdom) Amy Lack

=== Final standings ===
Pos	Team	Pld	W	OTW	OTL	L	GF	GA	GD	Pts	Promotion or relegation
1	Kazakhstan	5	5	0	0	0	30	2	+28	15	Promoted to the 2016 Division I B
2	Great Britain (H)	5	4	0	0	1	23	5	+18	12	
3	South Korea	5	2	1	0	2	21	8	+13	8	
4	Poland	5	1	1	1	2	17	17	0	6	
5	Croatia	5	1	0	0	4	9	45	−36	3	
6	New Zealand	5	0	0	1	4	5	28	−23	1	Relegated to the 2016 Division II B

Source: IIHF
(H) Host

=== Match results ===
All times are local (Western European Summer Time – UTC+1).

30 March 2015; 13:00	Croatia	3–10 (2–1, 1–4, 0–5)	Poland	Dumfries Ice Bowl, Dumfries; Attendance: 450

Game reference

Petra Belobrk
Goalies
Gabriela Mizera
Referee:
(Russia) Yana Zueva
Linesmen:
(United Kingdom) Leigh Hetherington
(Finland) Jenni Jaatinen

Smolec (Kadijević) – 05:11	1–0
Krušelj Posavec (Filipec) – 14:02	2–0
	2–1	15:38 – Frąckowiak (Malinowska)
Krušelj Posavec – 20:48	3–1
	3–2	28:29 – Późniewska (Czaplik)
	3–3	33:51 – Czaplik (Późniewska) (PP)
	3–4	35:49 – Czaplik (Późniewska, Chrapek) (PP)
	3–5	38:49 – Wieczorek (Bielas)
	3–6	40:27 – Czaplik (Sfora, Późniewska) (PP)
	3–7	44:31 Późniewska (Detmer)
	3–8	48:45 – Frąckowiak (SH)
	3–9	51:44 – Wieczorek (Frąckowiak, Malinowska) (SH)
	3–10	59:14 – Późniewska (Czaplik)

12 min
Penalties
12 min
27
Shots
45

30 March 2015; 16:30	South Korea	0–2 (0–0, 0–1, 0–1)	Kazakhstan	Dumfries Ice Bowl, Dumfries; Attendance: 175

Game reference
Shin So-jung	Goalies	Aizhan Raushanova	Referee: (United States) Kristine Morrison; Linesmen: (Belgium) Marine Dinant (United Kingdom) Amy Lack
0–1 / 21:51 – Ryspek (Koroleva); 0–2 / 42:46 – Konysheva (Fux)			Referee: (United States) Kristine Morrison; Linesmen: (Belgium) Marine Dinant (United Kingdom) Amy Lack
2 min	Penalties	8 min	Referee: (United States) Kristine Morrison; Linesmen: (Belgium) Marine Dinant (United Kingdom) Amy Lack
29	Shots	38	Referee: (United States) Kristine Morrison; Linesmen: (Belgium) Marine Dinant (United Kingdom) Amy Lack

30 March 2015; 20:00	Great Britain	8–1 (3–0, 2–0, 3–1)	New Zealand	Dumfries Ice Bowl, Dumfries; Attendance: 360

Game reference

Nicole Jackson
Goalies
Grace Harrison
Referee:
(Czech Republic) Radka Růžičková
Linesmen:
(Germany) Melanie Bauer
(Slovakia) Tatiana Kasášová

K. Henry (Scoon) (PP) – 01:36	1–0
Newman (Bloom) (PP) – 05:46	2–0
Adams (P. Henry, Gale) – 07:03	3–0
Adams (Gale, Allen) – 35:00	4–0
Ganney (Scoon) – 35:39	5–0
	5–1	44:20 – Thakker (Goulding)
Bloom (Allen, Newman) – 45:13	6–1
K. Henry (Aldridge) (PP) – 50:18	7–1
K. Henry (Handisides) – 54:09	8–1

20 min
Penalties
24 min
44
Shots
32

31 March 2015; 13:00	Kazakhstan	4–1 (2–0, 1–1, 1–0)	Poland	Dumfries Ice Bowl, Dumfries; Attendance: 483

Game reference

Aizhan Raushanova
Goalies
Agata Kosińska
Referee:
(Japan) Kyoko Ugajin
Linesmen:
(Belgium) Marine Dinant
(Finland) Jenni Jaatinen

Ryspek (Koroleva) – 04:50	1–0
Felzink (Fux) – 09:59	2–0
Tukhtieva (Tursynova, Fux) – 32:34	3–0
	3–1	32:34 – Późniewska (Chrapek)
Koroleva – 49:31	4–1

14 min
Penalties
12 min
32
Shots
30

31 March 2015; 16:30	New Zealand	2–4 (1–1, 1–1, 0–2)	Croatia	Dumfries Ice Bowl, Dumfries; Attendance: 189

Game reference

Grace Harrison
Goalies
Petra Belobrk
Referee:
(Czech Republic) Radka Růžičková
Linesmen:
(United Kingdom) Leigh Hetherington
(Slovakia) Tatiana Kasášová

Horner-Pascoe (Murray) – 06:17	1–0
	1–1	11:58 – Kadijević (Delić)
Horner-Pascoe (Gottgtroy, Thakker) – 23:13	2–1
	2–2	26:35 – Kadijević
	2–3	55:25 – Krušelj Posavec (Filipec) (PP)
	2–4	59:19 – Filipec (ENG)

12 min
Penalties
10 min
27
Shots
49

31 March 2015; 20:00	Great Britain	3–1 (2–1, 1–0, 0–0)	South Korea	Dumfries Ice Bowl, Dumfries; Attendance: 362

Game reference

Samantha Bolwell
Goalies
Shin So-jung
Referee:
(United States) Kristine Morrison
Linesmen:
(Germany) Melanie Bauer
(Sweden) Stephanie Cole

Newman (Allen, Bloom) – 05:12	1–0
Ganney (Farman) – 05:28	2–0
	2–1	10:54 – Choi (Han J.)
Newman (Lamb) – 37:12	3–1

10 min
Penalties
12 min
31
Shots
19

2 April 2015; 13:00	Kazakhstan	10–0 (4–0, 2–0, 4–0)	New Zealand	Dumfries Ice Bowl, Dumfries; Attendance: 247

Game reference

Tatyana Mozhayeva
Goalies
Firth Bidois
Grace Harrison
Referee:
(United States) Kristine Morrison
Linesmen:
(United Kingdom) Leigh Hetherington
(United Kingdom) Amy Lack

Moldabai (Ashimova) (PP) – 07:21	1–0
Tursynova (Feklistova, Fux) – 10:54	2–0
Felznik (Bushuyeva) – 14:26	3–0
Fux (Tursynova, Tukhtieva) – 15:31	4–0
Fux (Tukhtieva, Nurgalieva) (PP) – 31:35	5–0
Ryspek (Koroleva) – 31:55	6–0
Tursynova (Tukhtieva, Fux) (PP) – 43:40	7–0
Filimonova (Bushuyeva, Felznik) – 44:46	8–0
Ryspek (PP) – 58:31	9–0
Tukhtieva (Fux) – 59:36	10–0

8 min
Penalties
10 min
59
Shots
15

2 April 2015; 16:30	South Korea	4–3 GWS (0–1, 3–1, 0–1) (OT: 0–0) (SO: 1–0)	Poland	Dumfries Ice Bowl, Dumfries; Attendance: 146

Game reference

Shin So-jung
Goalies
Gabriela Mizera
Referee:
(Russia) Yana Zueva
Linesmen:
(Sweden) Stephanie Cole
(Finland) Jenni Jaatinen

	0–1	10:16 – Późniewska (Chrapek) (PP)
Jo (Ko H., Park Y.)(PP) – 24:30	1–1
	1–2	24:44 – Późniewska (Czaplik)
Park J. (Ko) (PP) – 30:33	2–2
Park J. (Park C.) – 35:31	3–2
	3–3	45:39 – Późniewska (Czaplik, Pióro)

Choi (miss)
Lee K.
Park J. (miss)
Choi
Shootout
(miss) Czaplik
(miss) Frąckowiak
Późniewska
(miss) Późniewska
14 min
Penalties
10 min
23
Shots
53

2 April 2015; 20:00	Great Britain	8–1 (0–1, 5–0, 3–0)	Croatia	Dumfries Ice Bowl, Dumfries; Attendance: 303

Game reference

Nicole Jackson
Goalies
Petra Belobrk
Referee:
(Japan) Kyoko Ugajin
Linesmen:
(Belgium) Marine Dinant
(Slovakia) Tatiana Kasášová

	0–1	18:59 – Filipec (Matic, Krušelj Posavec
Bloom (Newman, Allen) – 23:48	1–1
Newman (Bloom) – 23:56	2–1
Aldridge (K. Henry) – 26:29	3–1
Newman (Bloom) – 33:14	4–1
K. Henry (Aldridge, Summers) – 34:48	5–1
Allen (Newman, Summers) (PP) – 44:13	6–1
K. Henry (Lamb) – 56:54	7–1
Gale (P. Henry) – 59:07	8–1

10 min
Penalties
8 min
38
Shots
22

4 April 2015; 13:00	New Zealand	0–3 (0–1, 0–2, 0–0)	South Korea	Dumfries Ice Bowl, Dumfries; Attendance: 193

Game reference

Grace Harrison
Goalies
Shin So-jung
Referee:
(Japan) Kyoko Ugajin
Linesmen:
(Belgium) Marine Dinant
(United Kingdom) Amy Lack

0–1	15:53 – Ko H. (Han S., Park J.
0–2	28:24 – Choi (Lee K.)
0–3	28:54 – Park J. (Han)

10 min
Penalties
4 min
17
Shots
56

4 April 2015; 16:30	Croatia	1–12 (0–5, 0–5, 1–2)	Kazakhstan	Dumfries Ice Bowl, Dumfries; Attendance: 215

Game reference

Lana Belić
Petra Belobrk
Goalies
Aizhan Raushanova
Tatyana Mozhayeva
Referee:
(Russia) Yana Zueva
Linesmen:
(Germany) Melanie Bauer
(Sweden) Stephanie Cole

	0–1	09:26 – Ashimova (PP)
	0–2	12:45 – Ryspek (Koroleva)
	0–3	14:31 – Tursynova (Fux, Tukhtieva)
	0–4	16:47 – Tukhtieva (Tursynova, Fux) (PP)
	0–5	19:02 – Tukhtieva (Fux) (SH)
	0–6	23:35 – Tukhtieva
	0–7	24:54 – Bushuyeva (Filimonova)
	0–8	26:00 – Nurgalieva (Fux, Tukhtieva)
	0–9	33:46 – Khamimuldinova
	0–10	36:23 – Bushuyeva (Tuleubayeva)
Krušelj Posavec (Kadijević) (PP) – 48:19	1–10
	1–11	51:16 – Bushuyeva (Khamimuldinova)
	1–12	59:56 – Ashimova (Koroleva) (PP)

8 min
Penalties
10 min
17
Shots
50

4 April 2015; 20:00	Poland	0–4 (0–1, 0–0, 0–3)	Great Britain	Dumfries Ice Bowl, Dumfries; Attendance: 723

Game reference

Agata Kosińska
Goalies
Nicole Jackson
Referee:
(Czech Republic) Radka Růžičková
Linesmen:
(Finland) Jenni Jaatinen
(Slovakia) Tatiana Kasášová

0–1	13:30 – Bloom (Adams) (PP)
0–2	47:27 – Henry (Lane)
0–3	55:16 – Ganney (Farman)
0–4	59:50 – Allen (Bloom, Newman)

4 min
Penalties
10 min
30
Shots
25

5 April 2015; 13:00	South Korea	13–0 (2–0, 6–0, 5–0)	Croatia	Dumfries Ice Bowl, Dumfries; Attendance: 103

Game reference

Shin So-jung
Han Do-hee
Goalies
Petra Belobrk
Lana Belić
Referee:
(United States) Kristine Morrison
Linesmen:
(Sweden) Stephanie Cole
(United Kingdom) Leigh Hetherington

Park J. (Choi) (SH) – 04:59	1–0
Ahn (Jo, Choi) (PP) – 08:44	2–0
Jo (Han J.) – 23:31	3–0
Park J. (Park Y.) – 24:34	4–0
Jo (Choi, Park Y.) – 25:29	5–0
Park J. (Han S., Jo) – 31:37	6–0
Jo (Ko C.) – 34:43	7–0
Han S. (Yong) – 39:01	8–0
Ahn – 45:36	9–0
Ahn (Ko C.) – 48:21	10–0
Ko (Han S.) (EA) – 48:54	11–0
Lee (Ahn) – 57:51	12–0
Park J. (Han S., Lim) – 58:32	13–0

4 min
Penalties
6 min
57
Shots
14

5 April 2015; 16:30	Poland	3–2 GWS (0–2, 1–0, 1–0) (OT: 0–0) (SO: 1–0)	New Zealand	Dumfries Ice Bowl, Dumfries; Attendance: 152

Game reference

Gabriela Mizera
Goalies
Grace Harrison
Referee:
(Japan) Kyoko Ugajin
Linesmen:
(Germany) Melanie Bauer
(United Kingdom) Amy Lack

	0–1	07:59 – Thakker
	0–2	15:44 – Horner-Pascoe (Hay)
Wieczorek (Bigos) – 39:56	1–2
Czaplik (Późniewska) – 46:15	2–2

Łaskawska (miss)
Wieczorek
Późniewska (miss)
Shootout
(miss) Gottgtroy
(miss) Thakker
(miss) Horner-Pascoe
6 min
Penalties
10 min
61
Shots
27

5 April 2015; 20:00	Kazakhstan	2–0 (0–0, 1–0, 1–0)	Great Britain	Dumfries Ice Bowl, Dumfries; Attendance: 718

Game reference
Aizhan Raushanova	Goalies	Nicole Jackson	Referee: (Russia) Yana Zuyeva; Linesmen: (Belgium) Marine Dinant (Finland) Jenni Jaatinen
Tursynova (Fux, Feklistova) – 21:47 / 1–0; Konysheva (Fux) – 43:31 / 2–0			Referee: (Russia) Yana Zuyeva; Linesmen: (Belgium) Marine Dinant (Finland) Jenni Jaatinen
4 min	Penalties	4 min	Referee: (Russia) Yana Zuyeva; Linesmen: (Belgium) Marine Dinant (Finland) Jenni Jaatinen
26	Shots	24	Referee: (Russia) Yana Zuyeva; Linesmen: (Belgium) Marine Dinant (Finland) Jenni Jaatinen

=== Awards and statistics ===
==== Awards ====
- Best players selected by the directorate:
  - Best Goalkeeper: (United Kingdom) Nicole Jackson
  - Best Defenseman: (United Kingdom) Jodie-Leigh Bloom
  - Best Forward: (Kazakhstan) Alyona Fux

Source: IIHF.com

==== Scoring leaders ====
List shows the top skaters sorted by points, then goals.

Player	GP	G	A	Pts	+/−	PIM	POS
(Kazakhstan) Alyona Fux	5	2	12	14	+10	0	F
(Poland) Karolina Późniewska	5	7	4	11	+3	0	F
(Kazakhstan) Zarina Tukhtieva	5	5	5	10	+9	4	F
(United Kingdom) Christine Newman	5	6	3	9	+7	8	F
(South Korea) Park Jong-ah	5	7	1	8	+6	2	F
(Poland) Magdalena Czaplik	5	4	4	8	+6	0	F
(United Kingdom) Jodie-Leigh Bloom	5	2	6	8	+8	2	D
(Kazakhstan) Madina Tursynova	5	4	3	7	+7	4	F
(United Kingdom) Saffron Allen	5	2	5	7	+8	0	F
(United Kingdom) Katie Henry	5	5	1	6	+3	0	F

GP = Games played; G = Goals; A = Assists; Pts = Points; +/− = Plus/minus; PIM = Penalties in minutes; POS = Position
Source: IIHF.com

==== Goaltending leaders ====
Only the top five goaltenders, based on save percentage, who have played at least 40% of their team's minutes, are included in this list.

Player	TOI	GA	GAA	SA	Sv%	SO
(Kazakhstan) Aizhan Raushanova	220:00	1	0.27	94	98.94	2
(United Kingdom) Nicole Jackson	238:56	4	1.00	110	96.36	1
(South Korea) Shin So-jung	284:22	8	1.69	148	94.59	1
(New Zealand) Grace Harrison	284:20	23	4.85	252	90.87	0
(Poland) Gabriela Mizera	190:00	8	2.53	77	89.61	0

TOI = Time on Ice (minutes:seconds); SA = Shots against; GA = Goals against; GAA = Goals against average; Sv% = Save percentage; SO = Shutouts
Source: IIHF.com

== Division II Group B ==
2015 IIHF Women's World Championship Division II B
Tournament details
- Host country: Spain
- Venue: 1 (in 1 host city)
- Dates: 7–13 March 2015
- Teams: 6

Tournament statistics
- Games played: 15
- Goals scored: 82 (5.47 per game)
- Attendance: 6,485 (432 per game)
- Scoring leader: (Slovenia) Pia Pren (11 points)

The Division II Group B tournament was played in Jaca, Spain, from 7 to 13 March 2015.

=== Participating teams ===
Team	Qualification
Australia	Placed 6th in Division II A last year and were relegated.
Slovenia	Placed 2nd in Division II B last year.
Spain	Hosts; placed 3rd in Division II B last year.
Iceland	Placed 4th in Division II B last year.
Belgium	Placed 5th in Division II B last year.
Mexico	Placed 1st in Division II B Qualification last year and were promoted.

=== Match officials ===
4 referees and 7 linesman were selected for the tournament.

Referees

- (Slovakia) Nikoleta Celárová
- (Russia) Elena Ivanova
- (China) Liu Chunhua
- (Austria) Ulrike Winklmayr

Linesman

- (Denmark) Trine Phillipsen
- (Poland) Joanna Pobożniak
- (Kazakhstan) Oxana Shestakova
- (Slovakia) Viera Šilhavíková
- (Russia) Olga Steinberg
- (Czech Republic) Tereza Štreitová
- (Norway) Cathrine Vestheim

=== Final standings ===
Pos	Team	Pld	W	OTW	OTL	L	GF	GA	GD	Pts	Promotion or relegation
1	Slovenia	5	4	0	0	1	28	9	+19	12	Promoted to the 2016 Division II A
2	Mexico	5	3	0	1	1	13	7	+6	10	
3	Spain (H)	5	2	1	0	2	15	11	+4	8	
4	Iceland	5	1	1	2	1	13	16	−3	7	
5	Australia	5	2	0	0	3	8	13	−5	6	
6	Belgium	5	0	1	0	4	5	26	−21	2	Relegated to the 2016 Division II B Qualification (Note: Belgium actually did not participate in 2016. Their next World Championship participation was in the 2017 Division II B Qualification.)

Source: IIHF
(H) Host

=== Match results ===
All times are local (Central European Time – UTC+1).

7 March 2015; 13:00	Mexico	1–2 GWS (0–0, 1–0, 0–1) (OT: 0–0) (SO: 0–1)	Iceland	Pabellón de Hielo, Jaca; Attendance: 200

Game reference
Monica Renteria	Goalies	Karítas Halldórsdóttir	Referee: (China) Liu Chunhua; Linesmen: (Denmark) Trine Phillipsen (Norway) Cathrine Vestheim
Hurtado (Cruz) – 22:31 / 1–0; / 1–1 / 51:46 – S. Björgvinsdóttir (Viðarsdóttir, Jóhannesdóttir)			Referee: (China) Liu Chunhua; Linesmen: (Denmark) Trine Phillipsen (Norway) Cathrine Vestheim
Tellez; F. Hernández (miss); Chávez (miss); Tellez (miss); M. Arroyo (miss)	Shootout	(miss) D. Björgvinsdóttir; S. Björgvinsdóttir; (miss) Jóhannesdóttir; (miss) S. Björgvinsdóttir; S. Björgvinsdóttir	Referee: (China) Liu Chunhua; Linesmen: (Denmark) Trine Phillipsen (Norway) Cathrine Vestheim
4 min	Penalties	6 min	Referee: (China) Liu Chunhua; Linesmen: (Denmark) Trine Phillipsen (Norway) Cathrine Vestheim
26	Shots	27	Referee: (China) Liu Chunhua; Linesmen: (Denmark) Trine Phillipsen (Norway) Cathrine Vestheim

7 March 2015; 16:30	Slovenia	13–2 (8–1, 1–0, 4–1)	Belgium	Pabellón de Hielo, Jaca; Attendance: 250

Game reference

Ines Confidenti
Špela Globočnik
Goalies
Kirsten Schonwetter
Referee:
(Russia) Elena Ivanova
Linesmen:
(Kazakhstan) Oxana Shestakova
(Russia) Olga Steinberg

Pren (Lepir) – 00:42	1–0
Pren (Lepir, S. Confidenti) – 02:57	2–0
Pren (Zimšek) – 07:38	3–0
Kraner – 08:15	4–0
Lepir (S. Confidenti) – 13:27	5–0
Pren (S. Confidenti) – 13:53	6–0
	6–1	17:50 – Huyghe (Bosmans, Liesens)
Dukarič (Beribak) – 18:43	7–1
Lepir (S. Confidenti, Duh) – 19:13	8–1
Pren (Zimšek) (PP) – 31:00	9–1
Pren (Lepir) (PP) – 46:35	10–1
Lepir (Pren, Zimšek) – 48:47	11–1
Dukarič (Pazlar, Kraner) – 51:04	12–1
Lepir (Pren) – 53:42	13–1
	13–2	58:57 – Bosmans (Huyghe, Liesens) (PP)

14 min
Penalties
10 min
65
Shots
10

7 March 2015; 20:00	Spain	4–1 (0–1, 3–0, 1–0)	Australia	Pabellón de Hielo, Jaca; Attendance: 1,500

Game reference

Carlota Alvarado
Goalies
Michelle Coonan
Referee:
(Slovakia) Nikoleta Celárová
Linesmen:
(Slovakia) Viera Šilhavíková
(Czech Republic) Tereza Štreitová

	0–1	Poole (Crompton, Harvey) – 14:16
Ortuno (Gurrea, V. Abrisqueta) (PP) – 23:24	1–1
Muñoz (Danielson) – 34:59	2–1
Gurrea (Ortuno, Calero) (PP) – 39:46	3–1
Muñoz (Reventos, Rivera) (PP) – 53:24	4–1

10 min
Penalties
18 min
52
Shots
19

8 March 2015; 13:00	Belgium	0–5 (0–3, 0–1, 0–1)	Mexico	Pabellón de Hielo, Jaca; Attendance: 65

Game reference

Kirsten Schonwetter
Goalies
Maria Meza
Referee:
(Slovakia) Nikoleta Celárová
Linesmen:
(Slovakia) Viera Šilhavíková
(Russia) Olga Steinberg

0–1	06:20 – Hurtado (Larios) (SH)
0–2	08:41 – Tellez (Chávez)
0–3	11:09 – González
0–4	33:32 – F. Hernández (Trevino) (PP)
0–5	42:03 – Chávez (Cardenas) (PP)

18 min
Penalties
16 min
18
Shots
32

8 March 2015; 16:30	Australia	0–3 (0–3, 0–0, 0–0)	Iceland	Pabellón de Hielo, Jaca; Attendance: 135

Game reference

Michelle Coonan
Joanne Phillis
Goalies
Karítas Halldórsdóttir
Referee:
(Russia) Elena Ivanova
Linesmen:
(Poland) Joanna Pobożniak
(Kazakhstan) Oxana Shestakova

0–1	04:15 – D. Björgvinsdóttir
0–2	04:49 – S. Björgvinsdóttir (Baldursdóttir, Viðarsdóttir)
0–3	10:07 – Sigurðardóttir (Guðbjartsdóttir)

10 min
Penalties
10 min
45
Shots
13

8 March 2015; 20:00	Slovenia	3–1 (1–1, 2–0, 0–0)	Spain	Pabellón de Hielo, Jaca; Attendance: 1,000

Game reference

Ines Confidenti
Goalies
Alba Gonzalo
Referee:
(Austria) Ulrike Winklmayr
Linesmen:
(Denmark) Trine Phillipsen
(Norway) Cathrine Vestheim

	0–1	03:26 – Rivera (Marques)
Pren (Duh) – 10:10	1–1
S. Confidenti (Lepir) – 24:04	2–1
Pren (Lepir) (SH) – 30:21	3–1

10 min
Penalties
29 min
36
Shots
21

10 March 2015; 13:00	Australia	3–0 (1–0, 1–0, 1–0)	Belgium	Pabellón de Hielo, Jaca; Attendance: 120

Game reference

Michelle Coonan
Goalies
Kirsten Schonwetter
Referee:
(Austria) Ulrike Winklmayr
Linesmen:
(Poland) Joanna Pobożniak
(Kazakhstan) Oxana Shestakova

Crompton (Tihema) – 05:33	1–0
Moore (Parkyn) – 32:39	2–0
Tihema – 54:13	3–0

6 min
Penalties
10 min
41
Shots
19

10 March 2015; 16:30	Slovenia	0–3 (0–1, 0–0, 0–2)	Mexico	Pabellón de Hielo, Jaca; Attendance: 87

Game reference

Ines Confidenti
Goalies
Monica Renteria
Referee:
(China) Liu Chunhua
Linesmen:
(Denmark) Trine Phillipsen
(Czech Republic) Tereza Štreitová

0–1	10:08 – Tellez (Chávez, Cardenas)
0–2	40:30 – M. Arroyo (Tellez, Chávez) (PP)
0–3	54:41 – Tellez (F. Hernández, Cardenas) (PP)

8 min
Penalties
10 min
22
Shots
26

10 March 2015; 20:00	Spain	5–4 GWS (2–0, 1–0, 1–4) (OT: 0–0) (SO: 1–0)	Iceland	Pabellón de Hielo, Jaca; Attendance: 600

Game reference

Carlota Alvarado
Goalies
Karítas Halldórsdóttir
Referee:
(Russia) Elena Ivanova
Linesmen:
(Slovakia) Viera Šilhavíková
(Russia) Olga Steinberg

Carrera (Ortuno, Gurrea) (PP) – 07:13	1–0
Merino (Rivera) – 18:56	2–0
Senac (Muñoz) – 25:44	3–0
	3–1	41:14 – Jóhannesdóttir (Baldursdóttir)
Muñoz (Alvarez) – 42:31	4–1
	4–2	56:39 – Viðarsdóttir (S. Björgvinsdóttir)
	4–3	58:01 – S. Björgvinsdóttir
	4–4	59:59 – Jóhannesdóttir (Karvelsdóttir) (EA)

Muñoz (miss)
Gurrea (miss)
Ortuno (miss)
Rivera
Shootout
(miss) Viðarsdóttir
(miss) S. Björgvinsdóttir
(miss) D. Björgvinsdóttir
(miss) S. Björgvinsdóttir
14 min
Penalties
14 min
46
Shots
34

12 March 2015; 13:00	Iceland	2–7 (1–0, 0–3, 1–4)	Slovenia	Pabellón de Hielo, Jaca; Attendance: 110

Game reference

Karítas Halldórsdóttir
Elise Valjaots
Goalies
Ines Confidenti
Referee:
(China) Liu Chunhua
Linesmen:
(Poland) Joanna Pobożniak
(Czech Republic) Tereza Štreitová

Guðbjartsdóttir (Jóhannesdóttir) (PP) – 06:32	1–0
	1–1	21:56 – Zimšek (Lepir) (PP)
	1–2	33:25 – S. Confidenti (Lepir)
	1–3	36:31 – Duh (S. Confidenti) (PP)
	1–4	40:36 – Duh
	1–5	53:56 – Lahajnar (Manfreda) (PP)
	1–6	54:55 – S. Confidenti (Loncar)
S. Björgvinsdóttir (Guðbjartsdóttir) – 57:09	2–6
	2–7	58:04 – S. Confidenti (Duh)

10 min
Penalties
10 min
15
Shots
47

12 March 2015; 16:30	Mexico	1–3 (1–0, 0–2, 0–1)	Australia	Pabellón de Hielo, Jaca; Attendance: 218

Game reference

Monica Renteria
Goalies
Michelle Coonan
Referee:
(Austria) Ulrike Winklmayr
Linesmen:
(Denmark) Trine Phillipsen
(Norway) Cathrine Vestheim

Tellez (Cardenas, F. Hernández) (PP) – 19:29	1–0
	1–1	26:16 – Moore (Carson) (PP)
	1–2	28:14 – Crompton (Green, Moore) (PP)
	1–3	47:19 – Green (Crompton) (PP)

12 min
Penalties
6 min
21
Shots
39

12 March 2015; 20:00	Belgium	0–3 (0–0, 0–0, 0–3)	Spain	Pabellón de Hielo, Jaca; Attendance: 650

Game reference

Kirsten Schonwetter
Goalies
Alba Gonzalo
Referee:
(Slovakia) Nikoleta Celárová
Linesmen:
(Slovakia) Viera Šilhavíková
(Russia) Olga Steinberg

0–1	43:19 – Abrisqueta (Senac, Moreno)
0–2	50:25 – Gurrea (Abrisqueta) (PP)
0–3	59:58 – Muñoz (Merino, Rivera) (PP)

20 min
Penalties
8 min
14
Shots
59

13 March 2015; 13:00	Australia	1–5 (0–1, 0–4, 1–0)	Slovenia	Pabellón de Hielo, Jaca; Attendance: 100

Game reference

Michelle Coonan
Joanne Phillis
Goalies
Ines Confidenti
Referee:
(Slovakia) Nikoleta Celárová
Linesmen:
(Slovakia) Viera Šilhavíková
(Czech Republic) Tereza Štreitová

	0–1	03:41 – Kraner (Manfreda, Pazlar)
	0–2	21:39 – Pazlar
	0–3	31:27 – S. Confidenti (Zimšek, Duh) (PP)
	0–4	39:04 – Pren (PP)
	0–5	39:29 – Pazlar (Kraner)
McOnie (Crompton – 43:18	1–5

10 min
Penalties
39 min
38
Shots
21

13 March 2015; 16:30	Iceland	2–3 OT (0–0, 1–2, 1–0) (OT: 0–1)	Belgium	Pabellón de Hielo, Jaca; Attendance: 150

Game reference

Karítas Halldórsdóttir
Goalies
Kirsten Schonwetter
Referee:
(Austria) Ulrike Winklmayr
Linesmen:
(Poland) Joanna Pobożniak
(Norway) Cathrine Vestheim

D. Björgvinsdóttir (Karvelsdóttir) (PP) – 21:59	1–0
	1–1	22:29 – Morel de Westgaver (Bosmans)
	1–2	35:36 – De Wolf (Jenaer, Liedts)
S. Björgvinsdóttir (Jóhannesdóttir, Sigurðardóttir) (PP) – 58:42	2–2
	2–3	64:52 – Morel de Westgaver

2 min
Penalties
10 min
38
Shots
31

13 March 2015; 20:00	Spain	2–3 (1–1, 0–0, 1–2)	Mexico	Pabellón de Hielo, Jaca; Attendance: 1,300

Game reference

Carlota Alvarado
Goalies
Monica Renteria
Referee:
(Russia) Elena Ivanova
Linesmen:
(Kazakhstan) Oxana Shestakova
(Russia) Olga Steinberg

	0–1	07:51 – Trevino (Escobedo, Hurtado) (PP)
Muñoz (Merino) – 15:30	1–1
	1–2	53:01 – F. Hernández (Tellez) (PP2)
Alvarez (Rivera, Castillejo) – 55:24	2–2
	2–3	59:20 – Tellez

14 min
Penalties
14 min
33
Shots
28

=== Awards and statistics ===
==== Awards ====
- Best players selected by the directorate:
  - Best Goalkeeper: (Mexico) Monica Renteria
  - Best Defenseman: (Spain) Vanesa Abrisqueta
  - Best Forward: (Slovenia) Pia Pren

Source: IIHF.com

==== Scoring leaders ====
List shows the top skaters sorted by points, then goals.

Player	GP	G	A	Pts	+/−	PIM	POS
(Slovenia) Pia Pren	3	9	2	11	+10	4	F
(Slovenia) Tamara Lepir	5	4	7	11	+14	4	F
(Slovenia) Sara Confidenti	5	5	5	10	+12	4	F
(Iceland) Silvia Björgvinsdóttir	5	6	1	7	+3	2	F
(Mexico) Claudia Tellez	5	5	2	7	+4	2	F
(Slovenia) Mojca Duh	5	2	5	7	+12	27	D
(Spain) Vega Muñoz	5	5	1	6	+2	6	F
(Spain) Carmen Rivera	5	2	4	6	−1	2	F
(Iceland) Flosrun Jóhannesdóttir	5	2	3	5	+3	0	F
(Australia) Sharnita Crompton	5	1	4	5	+4	8	F
(Slovenia) Sergeja Zimšek	5	1	4	5	+12	2	F

GP = Games played; G = Goals; A = Assists; Pts = Points; +/− = Plus/minus; PIM = Penalties in minutes; POS = Position
Source: IIHF.com

==== Goaltending leaders ====
Only the top five goaltenders, based on save percentage, who have played at least 40% of their team's minutes, are included in this list.

Player	TOI	GA	GAA	SA	Sv%	SO
(Mexico) Monica Renteria	245:00	7	1.71	123	94.31	1
(Slovenia) Ines Confidenti	270:21	8	2.78	106	92.45	0
(Iceland) Karítas Halldórsdóttir	309:53	15	2.90	193	92.23	1
(Australia) Michelle Coonan	242:05	11	2.73	116	90.52	1
(Spain) Carlota Alvarado	185:00	8	2.59	81	90.12	0

TOI = Time on Ice (minutes:seconds); SA = Shots against; GA = Goals against; GAA = Goals against average; Sv% = Save percentage; SO = Shutouts
Source: IIHF.com

== Division II Group B Qualification ==
2015 IIHF Women's World Championship Division II B Qualification
Tournament details
- Host country: Hong Kong
- Venue: 1 (in 1 host city)
- Dates: 18–21 February 2015
- Teams: 4

Tournament statistics
- Games played: 6
- Goals scored: 50 (8.33 per game)
- Attendance: 2,715 (453 per game)
- Scoring leader: (Turkey) Çağla Baktıroğlu (11 points)

The Division II Group B Qualification tournament was played from 18 to 21 February 2015 in Hong Kong.

=== Participating teams ===
Team	Qualification
Turkey	Placed 6th in Division II B last year and were relegated.
South Africa	Placed 2nd in Division II B Qualification last year.
Bulgaria	Placed 3rd in Division II B Qualification last year.
Hong Kong	Hosts; placed 4th in Division II B Qualification last year.

=== Match officials ===
3 referees and 5 linesman were selected for the tournament.

Referees

- (Australia) Ainslie Gardner
- (Japan) Etsuko Wada
- (China) Xu Jingwei

Linesman

- (China) Fu Zhennan
- (South Korea) Lee Kyung-sun
- (New Zealand) Alicia Thomasen
- (Japan) Yuka Tochigi
- (China) Wang Hui

=== Final standings ===
Pos	Team	Pld	W	OTW	OTL	L	GF	GA	GD	Pts	Promotion
1	Turkey	3	3	0	0	0	23	8	+15	9	Promoted to the 2016 Division II B
2	Hong Kong (H)	3	2	0	0	1	10	8	+2	6	
3	South Africa	3	1	0	0	2	13	12	+1	3	
4	Bulgaria	3	0	0	0	3	4	22	−18	0	

Source: IIHF
(H) Host

=== Match results ===
All times are local (Hong Kong Time – UTC+8).

18 February 2015; 15:00	Bulgaria	3–11 (2–3, 0–5, 1–3)	Turkey	Hong Kong Mega Ice, Hong Kong; Attendance: 338

Game reference

Vesela Krasteva
Goalies
Sera Doğramacı
Didem Deniz
Referee:
(Australia) Ainslie Gardner
Linesmen:
(China) Fu Zhennan
(Japan) Yuka Tochigi

	0–1	00:57 – Baktıroğlu (R. Yılmaz)
	0–2	03:51 – Eryılmaz (Demir) (PP)
Zareva (Stoyanova) – 04:38	1–2
	1–3	05:52 – Baktıroğlu (Demirkol)
Gospodinova (Lisichkova, Todorova) – 12:01	2–3
	2–4	23:12 – Öztaşdelen (Demirkol, Eryılmaz)
	2–5	26:00 – Yüksel
	2–6	28:21 – Demirkol (Öztaşdelen)
	2–7	29:10 – Taygar (R. Yılmaz)
	2–8	36:35 – Baktıroğlu (Yüksel, Demir)
	2–9	42:10 – Baktiroglu (Alkan) (PP)
Stoyanova (Bobeva, Zareva) (PP) – 46:26	3–9
	3–10	50:00 S. Yılmaz (Eryılmaz)
	3–11	53:45 – Baktıroğlu (R. Yılmaz)

12 min
Penalties
6 min
30
Shots
62

18 February 2015; 18:30	South Africa	3–4 (1–1, 0–2, 2–1)	Hong Kong	Hong Kong Mega Ice, Hong Kong; Attendance: 418

Game reference

Sandra McClurg
Goalies
Wong Ying Chi Virginia
Referee:
(Japan) Etsuko Wada
Linesmen:
(South Korea) Lee Kyung-sun
(New Zealand) Alicia Thomasen

Schuurman (Adamson) – 03:29	1–0
	1–1	05:38 – Wong T. (Ip)
	1–2	34:41 – Wong T. (Leung) (PP)
	1–3	37:03 – Ip
Oxenham (Schuurman) (SH) – 48:19	2–3
Oxenham (Adamson) – 57:06	3–3
	3–4	57:40 – Kong (Wong T., Ip)

10 min
Penalties
4 min
30
Shots
19

19 February 2015; 15:00	South Africa	6–0 (1–0, 1–0, 4–0)	Bulgaria	Hong Kong Mega Ice, Hong Kong; Attendance: 448

Game reference

Shaylene Swanepoel
Goalies
Vesela Kasteva
Referee:
(China) Xu Jingwei
Linesmen:
(South Korea) Lee Kyung-sun
(China) Wang Hui

Oxenham (Verwey) – 11:45	1–0
Schuurman (Rhode) – 21:51	2–0
Rhode – 43:42	3–0
Oxenham – 44:10	4–0
Verwey (Skinner) – 51:29	5–0
Coetzee (Nelson, Jamieson) – 53:32	6–0

10 min
Penalties
2 min
42
Shots
20

19 February 2015; 18:30	Turkey	4–1 (1–0, 1–0, 2–1)	Hong Kong	Hong Kong Mega Ice, Hong Kong; Attendance: 505

Game reference

Sera Doğramacı
Didem Deniz
Goalies
Lee Jenny Kai-Chin
Referee:
(Australia) Ainslie Gardner
Linesmen:
(China) Fu Zhennan
(Japan) Yuka Tochigi

Baktıroğlu (R. Yılmaz, Demir) – 13:49	1–0
Baktıroğlu (R. Yılmaz) – 24:20	2–0
	2–1	42:20 – Wong T. (Ip, Kong)
Baktıroğlu (Yüksel) – 44:31	3–1
Demir (Yüksel) – 49:24	4–1

24 min
Penalties
14 min
42
Shots
20

21 February 2015; 15:00	Hong Kong	5–1 (1–1, 2–0, 2–0)	Bulgaria	Hong Kong Mega Ice, Hong Kong; Attendance: 480

Game reference

Wong Ying Chi Virginia
Lee Jenny Kai-Chin
Goalies
Vesela Krasteva
Paulina Georgieva
Referee:
(China) Xu Jingwei
Linesmen:
(South Korea) Lee Kyung-sun
(New Zealand) Alicia Thomasen

Kong (Wong T., Ip) – 10:08	1–0
	1–1	16:31 – Lisichkova
Wong T. (Kong) – 20:25	2–1
Kong (Chow, Ip) – 36:23	3–1
Low (EA) – 44:08	4–1
Ip – 56:28	5–1

8 min
Penalties
8 min
42
Shots
20

21 February 2015; 18:30	Turkey	8–4 (3–0, 5–2, 0–2)	South Africa	Hong Kong Mega Ice, Hong Kong; Attendance: 476

Game reference

Sera Doğramacı
Didem Deniz
Goalies
Sandra McClurg
Shaylene Swanepoel
Referee:
(Japan) Etsuko Wada
Linesmen:
(Japan) Yuka Tochigi
(China) Wang Hui

Demirkol (Baktıroğlu) (PP) – 05:15	1–0
Demirkol (Uygun, Öztaşdelen) (PP) – 11:43	2–0
Baktıroğlu (Demir, Yüksel) – 13:35	3–0
Öztaşdelen (Demirkol, Taygar) – 23:25	4–0
Demir (Demirkol, Öztaşdelen) (PP) – 23:56	5–0
Baktıroğlu (Demir) (SH) – 24:57	6–0
	6–1	29:48 – Oxenham (Birrell)
Demirkol (Uygun, Demir) (PP) – 30:41	7–1
	7–2	30:53 – Rhode (Oxenham) (PP)
Öztaşdelen (Demir) (PP) – 46:57	8–2
	8–3	Verwey – 48:27
	8–4	Rhode (Oxenham) – 49:44

10 min
Penalties
18 min
40
Shots
37

=== Awards and statistics ===
==== Awards ====
- Best players selected by the directorate:
  - Best Goalkeeper: (Hong Kong) Lee Jenny Kai-Chin
  - Best Defenseman: (Bulgaria) Tina Lisichkova
  - Best Forward: (Turkey) Çağla Baktıroğlu

Source: IIHF.com

==== Scoring leaders ====
List shows the top skaters sorted by points, then goals.

Player	GP	G	A	Pts	+/−	PIM	POS
(Turkey) Çağla Baktıroğlu	3	10	1	11	+8	4	F
(Turkey) Seda Demir	3	2	7	9	+6	16	F
(Turkey) Başak Demirkol	3	4	4	8	+1	2	F
(South Africa) Donne Oxenham	3	5	2	7	+8	6	F
(Hong Kong) Wong Tsui Yi	3	5	2	7	+5	2	F
(Hong Kong) Ip Estelle Claudia	3	2	5	7	+4	0	F
(Turkey) Gizem Öztaşdelen	3	3	3	6	0	2	F
(Turkey) Huriye Yeliz Yüksel	3	1	4	5	+5	0	D
(Turkey) Refika Yılmaz	3	0	5	5	+7	4	D
(Hong Kong) Kong Cheryl Lauren	3	3	1	4	+5	0	F
(South Africa) Dalene Rhode	3	3	1	4	+4	6	F

GP = Games played; G = Goals; A = Assists; Pts = Points; +/− = Plus/minus; PIM = Penalties in minutes; POS = Position
Source: IIHF.com

==== Leading goaltenders ====
Only the top five goaltenders, based on save percentage, who have played at least 40% of their team's minutes, are included in this list.

Player	TOI	GA	GAA	SA	Sv%	SO
(South Africa) Shaylene Swanepoel	94:24	2	1.27	41	95.12	1
(Hong Kong) Lee Jenny Kai-Chin	88:38	4	2.71	50	92.00	0
(Hong Kong) Wong Ying Chi Virginia	91:17	4	2.63	42	90.48	0
(Turkey) Sera Doğramacı	154:46	7	2.71	71	90.14	0
(Bulgaria) Vesela Krasteva	177:57	22	7.42	145	84.83	0

TOI = Time on Ice (minutes:seconds); SA = Shots against; GA = Goals against; GAA = Goals against average; Sv% = Save percentage; SO = Shutouts
Source: IIHF.com
