= 2012 IIHF Women's Challenge Cup of Asia =

Tournament details
- Host country: China
- Dates: 15–19 February 2012
- Teams: 4

Final positions
- Champions: Japan (2nd title)
- Runners-up: China 1
- Third place: China 2
- Fourth place: South Korea

Tournament statistics
- Games played: 8
- Goals scored: 54 (6.75 per game)
- Scoring leader: (Japan) Chiho Osawa (7 points)

The 2012 IIHF Women's Challenge Cup of Asia was the third IIHF Women's Challenge Cup of Asia, an annual international ice hockey tournament held by the International Ice Hockey Federation (IIHF). It was held from 15 February 2012 to 19 February 2012 in Qiqihar, China. Japan won the tournament for the second year in a row after defeating China's first team in the gold medal game. China's second team won bronze after defeating South Korea in the third place match.

== Overview ==
The 2012 IIHF Women's Challenge Cup of Asia began on 15 February 2012 in Qiqihar, China. The tournament expanded back to four teams from three in 2011 with the inclusion of a second Chinese national team. That second national team was the Chinese junior team. The opening game was played between the first and second teams of China with the first Chinese team defeating the second team 12–0. Japan won the tournament for the second year in a row after defeating China's first team in the gold medal game. China's second team finished in third place after defeating South Korea in the bronze medal game 2–1. Chiho Osawa of Japan finished the tournament as the top scorer after finishing with seven points including four goals and three assists. South Korea's Shin Sojung finished as the tournaments top goaltender based on save percentage with 93.33.

== Round robin ==
The four participating teams were placed in a single round robin. After playing the round-robin, the top two teams advanced to the gold medal game while teams rank three and four advanced to the bronze medal game.

Team	Pld	W	OTW	OTL	L	GF	GA	GD	Pts	Qualification
China 1	3	3	0	0	0	19	2	+17	9	Gold medal game
Japan	3	2	0	0	1	20	5	+15	6	Gold medal game
China 2	3	0	1	0	2	4	27	−23	2	Bronze medal game
South Korea	3	0	0	1	2	4	13	−9	1	Bronze medal game

Source: IIHF

All times local.

15 February 2012; 16:15	China 1	12 – 0 (5–0, 5–0, 2–0)	China 2	Qiqihar Icerink; Attendance: 220

Game reference

Wang Yuqing
Goalies
Jiao Jian
Yang Jiaqi
Referee:
(Japan) Miyuki Nakayama

1:53 - Zhang M (Fang)	1 – 0
2:46 - Yu (Gao)	2 – 0
3:41 - Ma	3 – 0
12:02 - Fang (Huang)	4 – 0
13:58 - Zhang B (Ma)	5 – 0
23:22 - Kong (Huo)	6 – 0
25:09 - Huang	7 – 0
29:13 - Cui (Huo)	8 – 0
34:16 - Huang (Kong)	9 – 0
35:41 - Ma	10 – 0
42:03 - Wang N (Fang)	11 – 0
43:50 - Zhang M (Yu, Gao) (PP)	12 – 0

4 min
Penalties
8 min
18
Shots
3

15 February; 19:15	Japan	6 – 1 (2–0, 2–1, 2–0)	South Korea	Qiqihar Icerink; Attendance: 1935

Game reference

Azusa Nakaoku
Goalies
Shin Sojung
Referee:
(China) Liu Chunhua

9:25 - Osawa (Yoneyama)	1 – 0
14:15 - Ishiura (Shimozawa, Toko)	2 – 0
31:35 - Toko (Shimozawa)	3 – 0
33:03 - Toko (Ishiura)	4 – 0
	4 – 1	34:37 - Han J (Han S) (PP)
41:49 - Morii (Shishiuchi)	5 – 1
55:49 - Osawa (Yamaya)	6 – 1

6 min
Penalties
4 min
66
Shots
5

16 February 2012; 16:15	China 1	3 – 0 (0–0, 3–0, 0–0)	South Korea	Qiqihar Icerink; Attendance: 374

Game reference

Shi Yao
Goalies
Shin Sojung
Referee:
(Japan) Miyuki Nakayama

24:18 - Gao	1 – 0
35:23 - Ma (Zhang B) (PP)	2 – 0
36:41 - Fang (Zhang M, Jiang) (PP)	3 – 0

10 min
Penalties
16 min
63
Shots
3

16 February 2012; 19:15	China 2	0 – 12 (0–4, 0–6, 0–2)	Japan	Qiqihar Icerink; Attendance: 312

Game reference

Jiao Jian
Yang Jiaqi
Goalies
Azusa Nakaoku
Referee:
(China) Lui Chunchua

0 – 1	6:36 - Yoneyama (Osawa) (SH)
0 – 2	13:00 - Yonyama (Takeuchi)
0 – 3	15:15 - Osawa (Eguchi) (PP)
0 – 4	18:31 - Shishiuchi (Morii)
0 – 5	26:59 - Shimozawa
0 – 6	27:28 - Shimozawa (Toko)
0 – 7	31:38 - Shimozawa
0 – 8	34:49 - Eguchi (Osawa, Yoneyama)
0 – 9	37:18 - Shimozawa
0 – 10	37:50 - Takeuchi (Takeda)
0 – 11	43:51 - Ishiura
0 – 12	59:27 - Ishiura (SH)

10 min
Penalties
8 min
5
Shots
59

18 February 2012; 16:15	China 1	4 – 2 (1–0, 2–1, 1–1)	Japan	Qiqihar Icerink; Attendance: 2012

Game reference

Shi Yao
Wang Yuqing
Goalies
Azusa Nakaoku
Referee:
(China) Liu Chunchua

11:49 - Kong (Fang)	1 – 0
20:17 - Wang N (Huang, Huo)	2 – 0
32:57 - Huang (Wang N)	3 – 0
	3 – 1	33:28 - T Eguchi (M Hori)
	3 – 2	53:38 - H Toko
56:54 - Fang (Zhang M, Kong)	4 – 2

6 min
Penalties
4 min
27
Shots
19

18 February 2012; 19:15	South Korea	3 – 4 GWS (0–0, 2–0, 1–3) (OT: 0–0) (SO: 0–1)	China 2	Qiqihar Icerink; Attendance: 293

Game reference

Han Dohee
Shin Sojung
Goalies
Jiao Jian
Yang Jiaqi
Referee:
(Japan) Miyuki Nakayama

29:57 - Lee K (Han S) PP)	1 – 0
33:39 - Han S	2 – 0
	2 – 1	41:07 - Jiang X (He) (PP)
46:17 - Park J (Ko) (PP)	3 – 1
	3 – 2	48:04 - Yang M (Lu) (PP)
	3 – 3	53:37 - Ju (He X)

Han S (miss)
Park J (miss)
Lee K (miss)
Shootout
Jiang X
(miss) Wen
12 min
Penalties
28 min
10
Shots
28

== Gold medal game ==
19 February 2012; 11:00	China 1	1 – 3 (0–0, 0–2, 1–1)	Japan	Qiqihar Icerink; Attendance: 2312

Game reference

Shi Yao
Goalies
Azusa Nakaoku
Referee:
(Japan) Miyuki Nakayama

	0 – 1	34:08 - Yoneyama (Osawa)
	0 – 2	37:48 - Shishiuchi (Fujimoto)
43:25 - Zhang M (Yu)	1 – 2
	1 – 3	46:47 - Osawa (Morii)

10 min
Penalties
2 min
22
Shots
41

== Bronze medal game ==
19 February 2012; 14:00	China 2	2 – 1 (2–1, 0–0, 0–0)	South Korea	Qiqihar Icerink; Attendance: 2290

Game reference

Yang Jiaqi
Goalies
Sojung Shin
Referee:
(China) Liu Chunhua

	0 – 1	4:55 - Ko (Lee K) (PP)
11:54 - Lv	1 – 1
12:25 - He (Jiang)	2 – 1

10 min
Penalties
8 min
21
Shots
21

== Scoring leaders ==
List shows the top ten skaters sorted by points, then goals, assists, and the lower penalties in minutes.

Player	GP	G	A	Pts	+/-	PIM	POS
(Japan) Chiho Osawa	4	4	3	7	+3	2	F
(Japan) Saki Shimozawa	4	4	2	6	+9	4	F
(China) Fang Xin	4	3	3	6	+6	2	F
(Japan) Haruna Yoneyama	3	3	2	5	+6	4	F
(China) Huang Haijing	4	3	2	5	+5	10	F
(Japan) Haruka Toko	4	3	2	5	+9	0	F
(China) Zhang Mengying	4	3	2	5	+6	0	F
(Japan) Fuka Ishiura	3	3	1	4	+9	0	F
(China) Ma Rui	4	3	1	4	+6	2	F
(China) Kong Minghui	4	2	2	4	+5	4	F

== Leading goaltenders ==
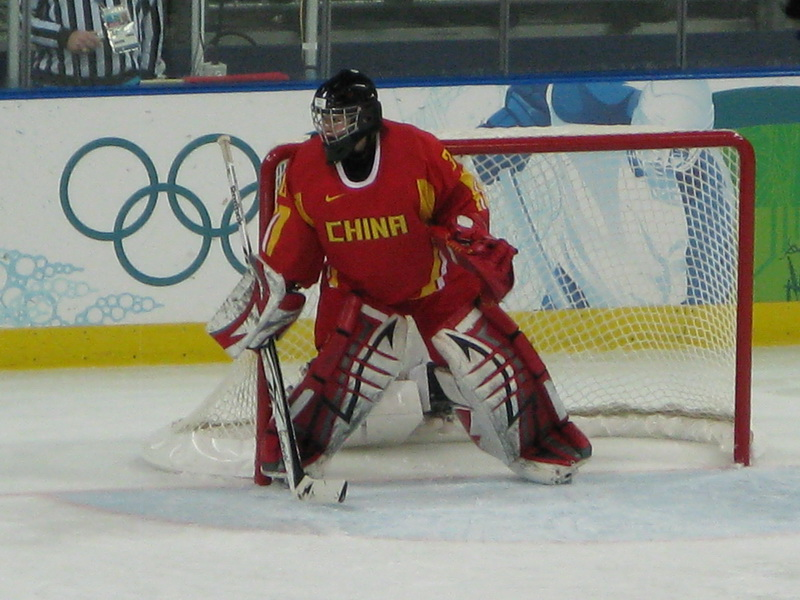
China's Shi Yao finished second among the goaltenders after conceding five goals and finishing with a save percentage of 92.06

Only the top goaltenders, based on save percentage, who have played at least 40% of their team's minutes are included in this list.

Player	MIP	SOG	GA	GAA	SVS%
(South Korea) Shin Sojung	209:57	165	11	3.14	93.33
(China) Shi Yao	178:59	63	5	1.68	92.06
(Japan) Azusa Nakaoku	240:00	59	6	1.50	89.83
(China) (2) Yang Jiaqi	117:03	61	10	5.13	83:61
(China) (2) Jiao Jian	127:57	47	18	8.44	61.70
