= Park Jong-ah =

South Korean ice hockey player (born 1996)

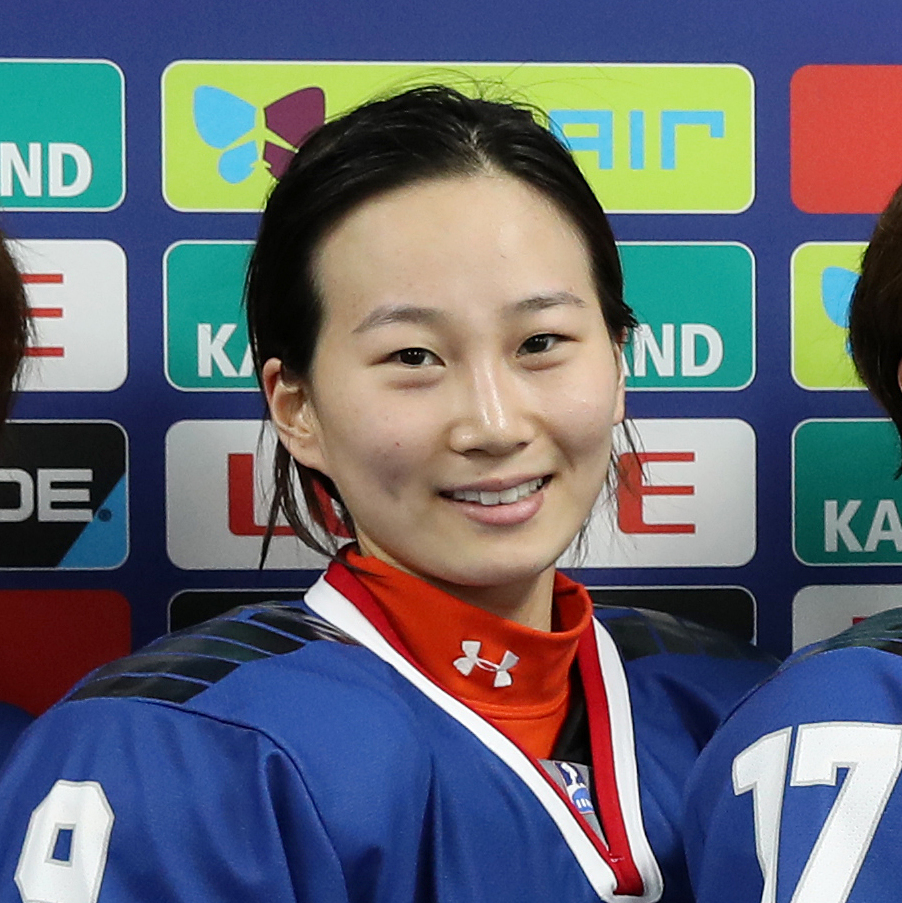
- Park in 2018
- Born: 13 June 1996 (age 30) Gangneung, South Korea
- Height: 160 cm (5 ft 3 in)
- Weight: 59 kg (130 lb; 9 st 4 lb)
- Position: Forward
- Shoots: Left
- KWHL team Former teams: Suwon City Hall WIHT; Ice Avengers; Phoenix
- National team: South Korea and Korea
- Playing career: c. 2011–present

- Park Jong-ah
- Hangul: 박종아
- RR: Bak Jonga
- MR: Pak Chonga

Park Jong-ah (Korean: 박종아; born 13 June 1996) is a South Korean ice hockey player who serves as the captain of the South Korean national ice hockey team. She currently plays domestically for the Suwon City Hall women's ice hockey team in the Korean Women's Hockey League (KWHL). As of April 2022, she held the record for the most goals (41) and total points (68) in the history of the South Korean women's national team.

== Playing career ==
Park took part in the women's ice hockey tournament at the 2018 Winter Olympics as a member of the unified team, which consisted of 35 players from both North Korea and South Korea. Coached by Sarah Murray, the team competed in Group B against Switzerland, Japan, and Sweden. On February 20, she recorded an assist on Han Soo-jin's power play goal during a 6–1 loss to Sweden, one of only two goals scored by the team during the tournament. Earlier, Park also had a prominent role in the 2018 Winter Olympics opening ceremony, serving as one of the penultimate torchbearers alongside North Korean player Jong Su-hyon.

Following her appearance at the 2018 Winter Olympics, Park continued to make a significant impact on the international stage by representing South Korea at the 2018 IIHF Women's World Championship Division I Group B tournament. During the tournament, she emerged as the offensive leader for the South Korean team, recording an impressive 4 goals and 3 assists, which made her the team's top scorer. Her dynamic performance and consistent contributions on the ice earned her the distinction of Best Forward of the tournament, highlighting her as one of the event's standout players. In recognition of her leadership, skill, and determination, the coaching staff of the South Korean national team also selected Park as the Best Player on their squad.

== Career statistics ==
=== International ===
Italics indicate tournament not included in official totals.

Year	Team	Event	Result	GP	G	A	Pts	PIM
2012	South Korea	CCOA	4th	4	1	0	1	4
2012	South Korea	WW D2B	3rd	5	6	2	8	0
2012	South Korea	OGQ	DNQ	3	1	2	3	2
2013	South Korea	WW D2B	1st	5	7	1	8	4
2014	South Korea	WW D2A	3rd	5	2	0	2	6
2015	South Korea	WW D2A	3rd	5	7	1	8	2
2016	South Korea	WW D2A	2nd	5	2	4	6	4
2017	South Korea	AWG	4th	5	6	4	10	0
2017	South Korea	WW D2A	1st	5	4	6	10	0
2018	Korea	OG	8th	5	0	1	1	6
2018	South Korea	WW D1B	2nd	5	4	3	7	2
2019	South Korea	WW D1B	2nd	5	6	4	10	2
2021	South Korea	OGQ	DNQ	6	1	1	2	4
2022	South Korea	WW D1B	5th	5	2	0	2	2
2023	South Korea	WW D1B	1st	5	2	4	6	2
Totals				68	45	29	74	40

== Awards and honors ==
- Directorate Award, Best Forward: 2018 IIHF Women's World Championship Division I, Group B
- Best Player on Team Selected by Coaches: 2018 IIHF Women's World Championship Division I, Group B
- Best Player on Team Selected by Coaches: 2022 IIHF Women's World Championship Division I, Group B
- Directorate Award, Best Forward: 2023 IIHF Women's World Championship Division I, Group B
- Best Player on Team Selected by Coaches: 2023 IIHF Women's World Championship Division I, Group B
