= Akane Hosoyamada =

Japanese-Canadian ice hockey player (born 1992)

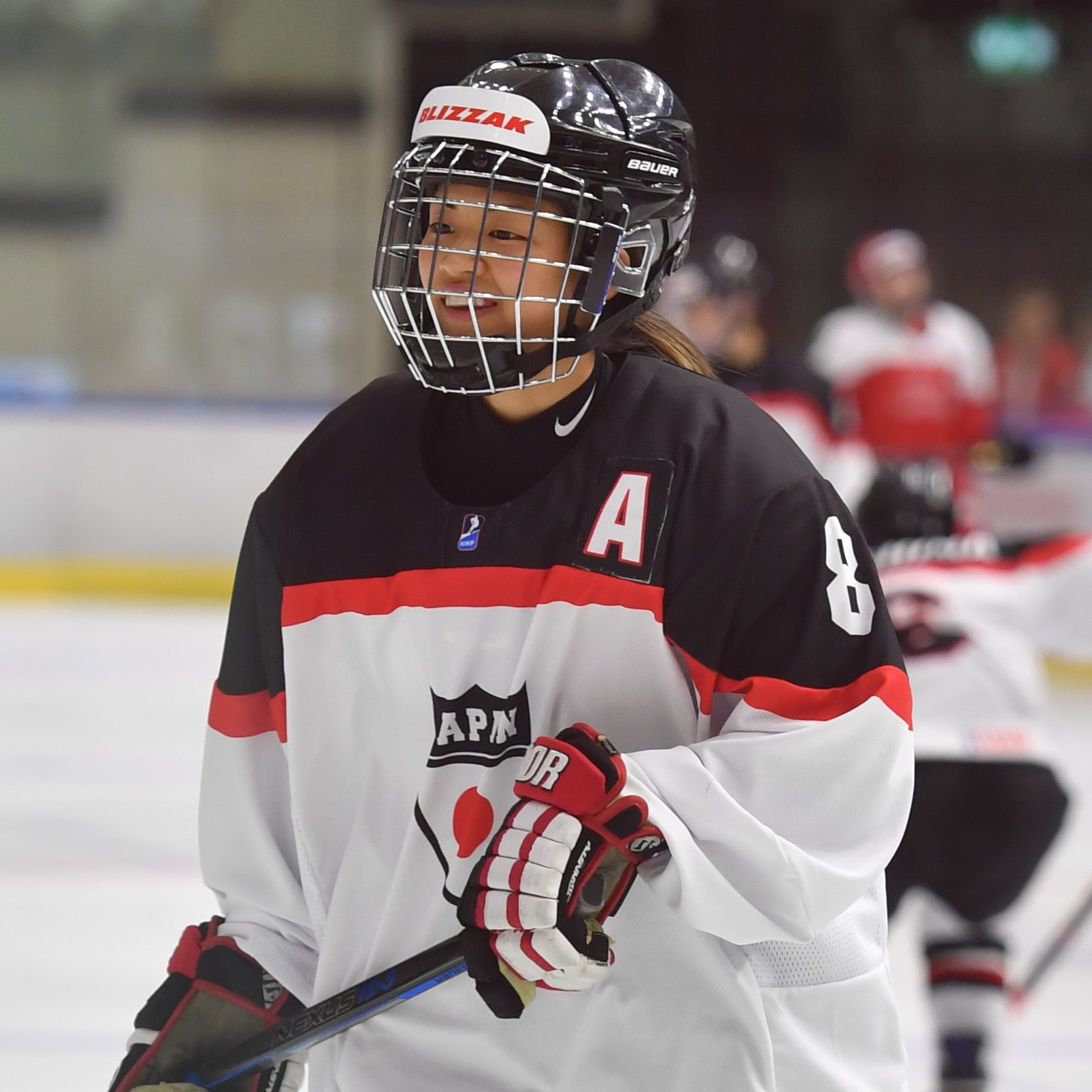
- Hosoyamada in 2017
- Born: 9 March 1992 (age 34) Banff, Alberta, Canada
- Height: 1.63 m (5 ft 4 in)
- Weight: 59 kg (130 lb; 9 st 4 lb)
- Position: Defence
- Shoots: Right
- WJIHL team Former teams: DK Peregrine; Syracuse Orange; Calgary Inferno
- National team: Japan
- Playing career: 2010–present
Medal record
Asian Winter Games
Gold medal – first place	2017 Sapporo	Team
Gold medal – first place	2025 Harbin	Team

Akane Hosoyamada (Japanese: 細山田 茜, Hepburn: Hosoyamada Akane; born 9 March 1992) is a Japanese-Canadian ice hockey player and alternate captain of the Japanese national team.

== Playing career ==
Hosoyamada began playing hockey at the age of five.

=== College ===
She played college ice hockey with the Syracuse Orange women's ice hockey program from 2010 to 2015. In her second season, she sustained an injury during the Orange's eighth game that kept her from playing for the remainder of the season. The limited number if games played during the 2011–12 season made her eligible to play a fifth season as a "redshirt senior." Across five seasons with the program, she appeared in 151 games, the second-most games played in program history, and notched the program's fifth-most points by a defenseman, with ten goals and 51 assists. She was named to College Hockey America (CHA) All-Conference teams in her first and fifth seasons and also served as team captain for the 2014–15 season.

=== Elite leagues ===
Hosoyamada played in the Canadian Women's Hockey League (CWHL) with the Calgary Inferno during the 2016–17 season, after which she relocated to Japan. She began playing with DK Peregrine in 2018.

== International play ==
Hosoyamada began attending Japan's training camps in 2015 and started competing in 2016. She debuted for Japan women's national ice hockey team in 2017 Asian Winter Games. In the 2017 IIHF Women's World Championship in Austria, she scored a hat trick against Norway in a 5–3 comeback victory for Japan.

She competed for Japan in the 2018 Winter Olympics. She assisted on the third goal in Japan's first-ever Olympic victory over combined Koreas.

She was part of the team for the 2019 IIHF Women's World Championship in Finland.

Hosoyamada made her second Olympic appearance in the 2022 Winter Olympics.

== Personal life ==
Hosoyamada was born to father Manabu and mother Yoko in Banff, Alberta, Canada.

She attended Syracuse University and graduated in 2015 with a degree in health and exercise science.
