= He Xin (ice hockey) =

Chinese ice hockey player

- Born: 24 July 1996 (age 30) Harbin, Heilongjiang, China
- Height: 168 cm (5 ft 6 in)
- Weight: 60 kg (132 lb; 9 st 6 lb)
- Position: Forward
- Shoots: Left
- Played for: KRS Vanke Rays; Harbin Ice Hockey; Vanke Rays
- National team: China
- Playing career: 2011–present
Medal record
Asian Winter Games
Silver medal – second place	2017 Sapporo	Ice hockey
Challenge Cup of Asia
Gold medal – first place	2014 Harbin
Bronze medal – third place	2012 Qiqihar

He Xin
- Traditional Chinese: 何欣
- Simplified Chinese: 何欣
Transcriptions
Standard Mandarin
- Hanyu Pinyin: Hé Xīn
Yue: Cantonese
- Yale Romanization: Hòh Yān

He Xin (Chinese: 何欣; born 24 July 1996), also known by the Western name Elsa He, is a Chinese ice hockey player and member of the Chinese national ice hockey team.

He represented China in the women's ice hockey tournament at the 2022 Winter Olympics in Beijing.

== Playing career ==
He has spent most of her career in China with Harbin Ice Hockey in her home city of Harbin. She has also played in the Canadian Women's Hockey League (CWHL) with the Vanke Rays during the 2017–18 season and in the Zhenskaya Hockey League (ZhHL) with the KRS Vanke Rays during the 2021–22 season.

== International play ==
As a junior player with the Chinese national under-18 team, she participated in the Division I Qualification tournaments of the IIHF U18 Women's World Championship in 2012, 2013, and 2014. At the 2014 tournament, she served as team captain and was selected as the best player on the team by the coaches.

He represented China at the Division I Group B tournaments of the IIHF Women's World Championship in 2014, 2015, 2016, 2017, 2018, and 2019, and at the Winter Universiades in 2015 and 2017. She won a silver medal in the women's ice hockey tournament at the 2017 Asian Winter Games, a gold medal at the 2014 IIHF Women's Challenge Cup of Asia, and a bronze medal with the China 2 team at the 2012 IIHF Women's Challenge Cup of Asia.
