= Yoshino Enomoto =

Japanese ice hockey player (born 1998)

Yoshino Enomoto 永野元 佳乃
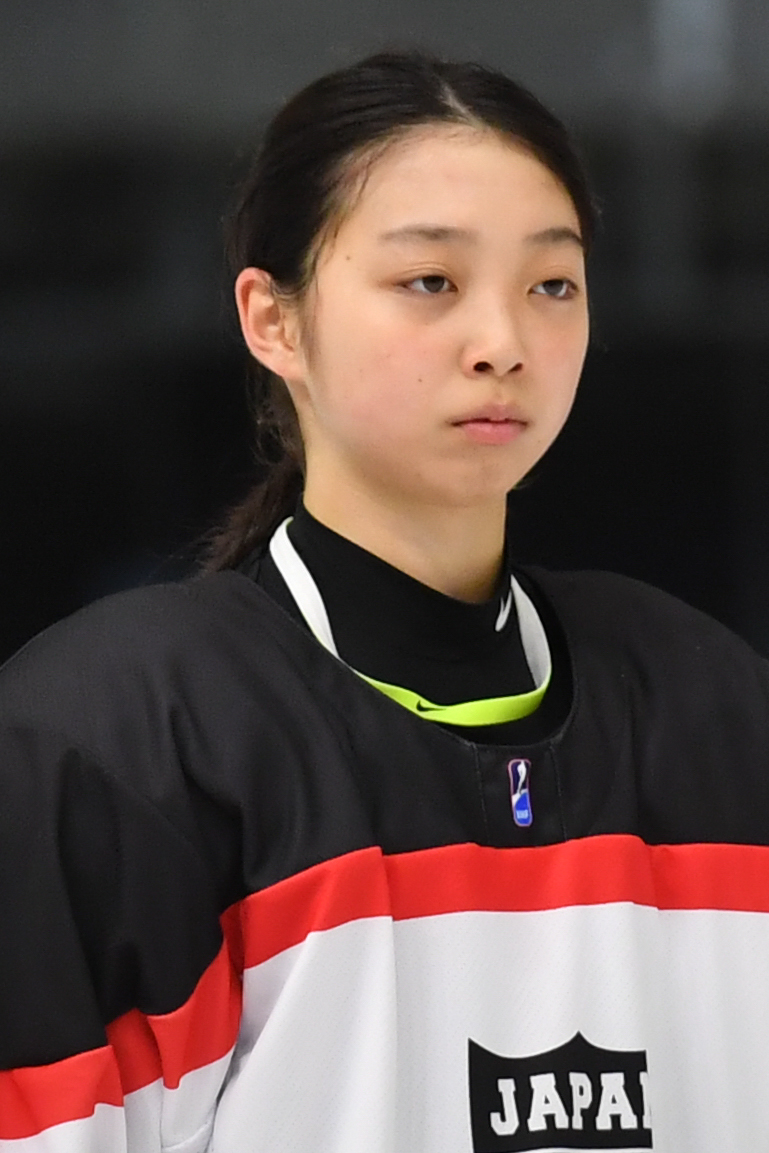
- Enomoto representing Japan at the 2017 IIHF World Championship D1A
- Born: 28 September 1998 (age 28) Osaka, Japan
- Height: 1.62 m (5 ft 4 in)
- Weight: 61 kg (134 lb; 9 st 8 lb)
- Position: Forward
- Shoots: Right
- WJIHL team: Seibu Princess Rabbits
- National team: Japan
- Playing career: 2017–present
Medal record
Asian Winter Games
Gold medal – first place	2017 Sapporo	Team
Gold medal – first place	2025 Harbin	Team
World University Games
Silver medal – second place	2023 Lake Placid	Team
Bronze medal – third place	2019 Krasnoyarsk	Team

Yoshino Enomoto (Japanese: 永野元佳乃, Hepburn: Enomoto Yoshino; born 28 September 1998) is a Japanese ice hockey player and member of the Japanese national team, currently playing with the Seibu Princess Rabbits in the Women's Japan Ice Hockey League (WJIHL) and the All-Japan Women's Ice Hockey Championship.

== Playing career ==
As a junior player with the Japanese national under-18 team, she participated in the Top Division tournaments of the IIHF U18 Women's World Championship in 2014 and 2015, and in the Division I tournament in 2016.

Enomoto debuted with the senior national team during the 2016–17 season, participating in the 2017 IIHF Women's World Championship Division I Group A and in the qualification tournament for the 2018 Winter Olympics. She won a gold medal in the women's ice hockey tournament at the 2017 Asian Winter Games in Sapporo.

A two-time FISU World University Games medalist, she won a bronze medal in the women's ice hockey tournament at the 2019 Winter Universiade in Krasnoyarsk and a silver medal in the women's ice hockey tournament at the 2023 Winter World University Games in Lake Placid, New York, during which she served as Japan's captain.

She represented Japan at the IIHF Women's World Championship in 2019 and 2022.
