= Park Ye-eun (ice hockey) =

South Korean ice hockey player

- Born: 28 May 1996 (age 29) Seoul, South Korea
- Height: 162 cm (5 ft 4 in)
- Weight: 56 kg (123 lb; 8 st 11 lb)
- Position: Defense
- Shoots: Right
- U Sports team Former teams: TMU Bold; Ice Beat; Phoenix
- National team: South Korea and Korea
- Playing career: 2012–present

- Park Ye-eun
- Hangul: 박예은
- RR: Bak Yeeun
- MR: Pak Yeŭn

Park Ye-eun (born 28 May 1996) is a South Korean ice hockey player and member of the South Korean national team. She plays with the TMU Bold women's ice hockey program (previously Ryerson Rams) in the Ontario University Athletics (OUA) association of U Sports.

== Playing career ==
Park competed in the 2018 Winter Olympics as part of a unified team of 35 players drawn from both North and South Korea. The team's coach was Sarah Murray and the team was in Group B competing against Switzerland, Japan and Sweden.
