= Alice Lamb =

- Born: October 5, 1984 (age 41)
- Height: 1.74 m (5 ft 9 in)
- Weight: 63 kg (139 lb; 9 st 13 lb)
- Position: Defenceman
- Shoots: Right
- WPIHL team Former teams: Bracknell Queen Bees; Slough Phantoms
- National team: Great Britain
- Playing career: 2000–present

Alice Lamb (born 5 October 1984) plays for Great Britain women's national ice hockey team as defenceman.
