= Mai Kondo =

Japanese ice hockey player

- Born: 4 April 1992 (age 32); Hokkaido, Japan
- Height: 1.66 m (5 ft 5 in)
- Weight: 58 kg (128 lb; 9 st 2 lb)
- Position: Goaltender
- Catches: Left
- J-League team: Mikage Gretz
- National team: Japan
- Playing career: 2015–present

Mai Kondo (近藤 真衣, Kondō Mai, born 4 April 1992) is a Japanese ice hockey player for Mikage Gretz and the Japanese national team. She participated at the 2015 IIHF Women's World Championship.

Kondo competed at the 2018 Winter Olympics.
