= Olga Konysheva =

Kazakhstani ice hockey player (born 1972)

Olga Konysheva Ольга Конышева
- Born: 29 May 1972 (age 54) Alma-Ata, Kazakh SSR, Soviet Union
- Height: 165 cm (5 ft 5 in)
- Weight: 62 kg (137 lb; 9 st 11 lb)
- Position: Forward
- Shot: Right
- Played for: Aisulu Almaty; Avangard Omsk
- National team: Kazakhstan
- Playing career: 1996–2023
Medal record
Asian Winter Games
Gold medal – first place	2003 Aomori	Ice hockey
Gold medal – first place	2011 Astana-Almaty	Ice hockey
Bronze medal – third place	2017 Sapporo	Ice hockey

Olga Petrovna Konysheva (Russian: Ольга Петровна Конышева; born 29 May 1972) is a Kazakhstani retired ice hockey player and former member of the Kazakh national ice hockey team.

== Playing career ==
There was no organized ice hockey for women or girls available to Konysheva when she was growing up and she pursued speed skating instead. At age 22, she began playing ice hockey. Two years later, in 1996, she joined Avangard Omsk in the Russian Women's Hockey League (RWHL). Across four RWHL seasons with Avangard, she scored sixteen goals and 27 points and accumulated 46 penalty minutes in 46 games.

Konysheva joined Aisulu Almaty, in her home city of Almaty, by 2007 at the latest. With Aisulu, Konysheva participated in six IIHF European Women's Champions Cup tournaments and six EWHL Super Cup tournaments. She remained with the club until her retirement in 2023.

== International play ==
A twenty-three season competitor with the Kazakh national team, Konysheva represented Kazakhstan in the women's ice hockey tournament at the 2002 Winter Olympics in Salt Lake City and at sixteen IIHF Women's World Championships, including the Top Division tournaments in 2001, 2005, 2009, and 2011. She is a three-time Asian Winter Games medalist, having won gold medals at the women's ice hockey tournaments in 2003 and 2011, and a bronze medal in 2017.

Konysheva retired from the national team in May 2022, shortly after participating in the Group B tournament of the 2022 IIHF Women's World Championship Division I.
