= Ko Hye-in =

South Korean ice hockey player

- Born: 18 July 1994 (age 30); South Korea
- Height: 163 cm (5 ft 4 in)
- Weight: 68 kg (150 lb; 10 st 10 lb)
- Position: Forward
- Shoots: Left
- KWHL team: Ice Avengers
- National team: South Korea and Korea
- Playing career: 2010–present

Ko Hye-in (born 18 July 1994) is a South Korean ice hockey player.

== Career ==
She competed in the 2018 Winter Olympics as part of a unified team of 35 players drawn from both North and South Korea. The team's coach was Sarah Murray and the team was in Group B competing against Switzerland, Japan and Sweden.
