= Choi Ji-yeon =

South Korean ice hockey player (born 1998)

- Born: 21 August 1998 (age 28) South Korea
- Height: 159 cm (5 ft 3 in)
- Weight: 52 kg (115 lb; 8 st 3 lb)
- Position: Forward
- Shoots: Left
- KWHL team Former teams: Suwon City Hall WIHT; Ice Avengers
- National team: South Korea and Korea
- Playing career: c. 2013–present

- Choi Ji-yeon
- Hangul: 최지연
- RR: Choe Jiyeon
- MR: Ch'oe Chiyŏn

Choi Ji-yeon (born 21 August 1998) is a South Korean ice hockey player and member of the South Korean national ice hockey team, currently playing in the Korean Women's Hockey League (KWHL) with the Suwon City Hall women's ice hockey team.

== Playing career ==
Choi participated in the women's ice hockey tournament at the 2018 Winter Olympics as part of a unified team of 35 players drawn from both the North Korean and South Korean national teams. The team's coach was Sarah Murray and the team played in Group B, competing against Switzerland, Japan, and Sweden.
