= Mika Hori =

Japanese ice hockey player (born 1992)

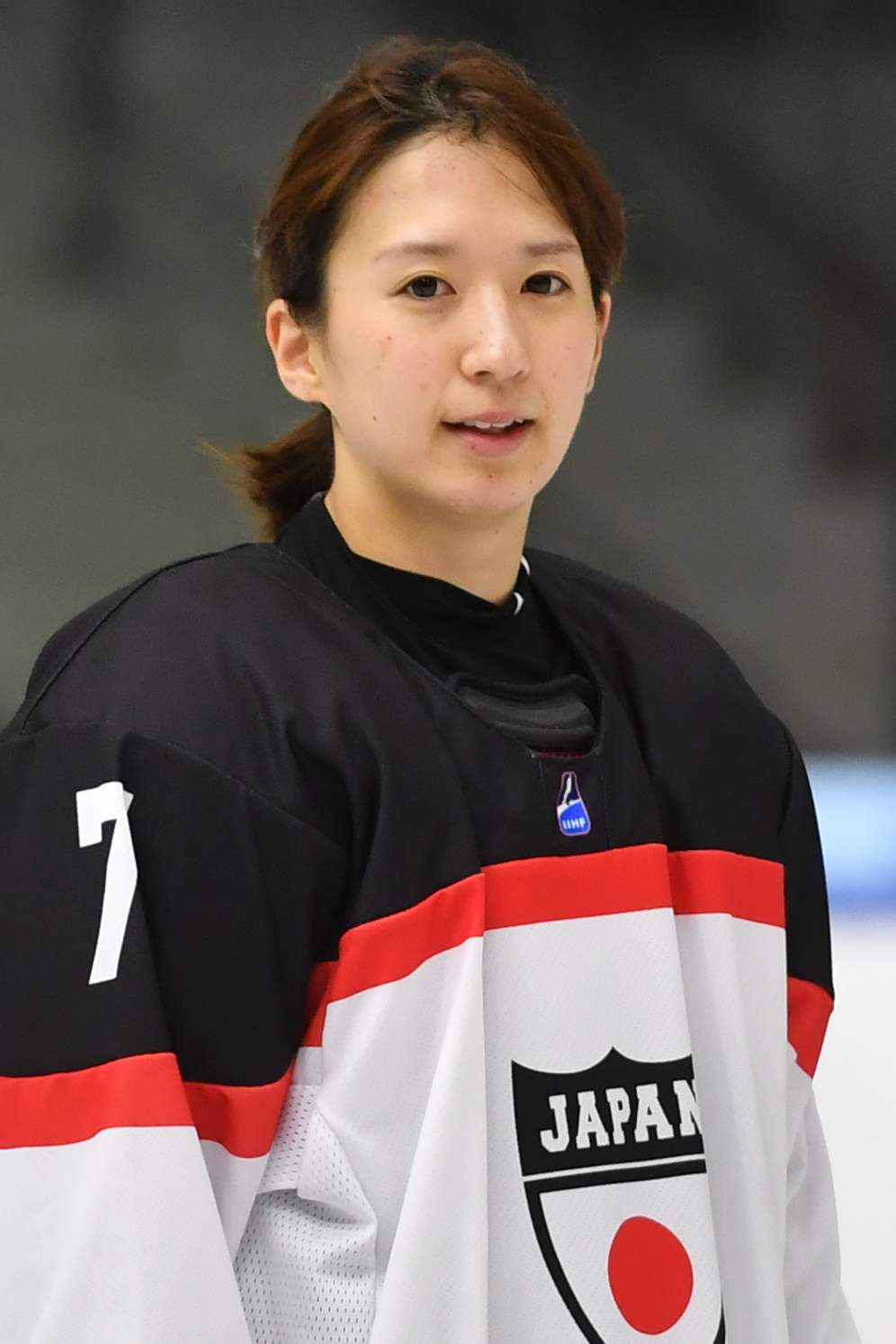
- Born: February 17, 1992 (age 33)
- Height: 1.63 m (5 ft 4 in)
- Weight: 53 kg (117 lb; 8 st 5 lb)
- Position: Defence
- Shoots: Right
- J-League team: Toyota Cygnus
- National team: Japan

Mika Hori (堀 珠花, Hori Mika, born February 17, 1992) is a Japanese ice hockey player for Toyota Cygnus and the Japanese national team. She participated at the 2015 IIHF Women's World Championship.

Hori competed at both the 2014 and the 2018 Winter Olympics.
