= Chiho Osawa =

Japanese ice hockey player

Chiho Osawa 大澤 ちほ
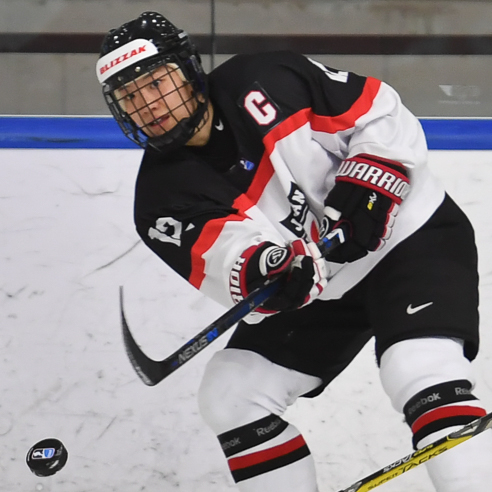
- Osawa in 2017
- Born: 10 February 1992 (age 34) Tomakomai, Hokkaido, Japan
- Height: 1.62 m (5 ft 4 in)
- Weight: 64 kg (141 lb; 10 st 1 lb)
- Position: Forward
- Shot: Right
- Played for: Luleå HF/MSSK; DK Peregrine; Toyota Cygnus
- National team: Japan
- Playing career: 2008–2022
Medal record
Universiade
Bronze medal – third place	2015 Granada	Team
Asian Winter Games
Gold medal – first place	2017 Sapporo	Team
Silver medal – second place	2011 Astana-Almaty	Team
Challenge Cup of Asia
Gold medal – first place	2012 China

Chiho Osawa (大澤 ちほ, Ōsawa Chiho; born 10 February 1992) is a Japanese retired ice hockey player and former captain of the Japanese national team. She most recently played in the 2020–21 season of the Swedish Women's Hockey League (SDHL) with Luleå HF/MSSK.

Osawa represented Japan at three Winter Olympic Games, eight IIHF Women's World Championships, two Asian Winter Games, and at the 2012 IIHF Challenge Cup of Asia and the 2015 Winter Universiade.

== Playing career ==
Osawa's first team was the club at her primary school. She joined Toyota Cygnus of the All-Japan Women's Ice Hockey Championship in 2004 while in junior high. In 2007, she began attending Tomakomai Higashi High School, which boasts one of the country's top co-ed ice hockey clubs. In her second year of high school, she transferred clubs from Toyota Cygnus to Mitsuboshi Daito Peregrine (now called DK Peregrine), the other All-Japan Championship team based in Tomakomai.

Osawa played with Peregrine from 2008 until 2018, except for the 2015–16 season, during which she moved to Detroit in the United States and played in the Women's Senior B league of the T1EHL with Victory Honda Sr. B.

In 2018, she moved to Luleå, Sweden, and signed with Luleå HF/MSSK, one of the top teams in the SDHL. She scored 18 points in 36 games during her rookie SDHL season. She notched six playoff assists as Luleå captured the Swedish Championship title. In July 2019, she suffered a torn hamstring at a pre-season national team camp, which sidelined her for two-thirds of the 2019–20 season. With Luleå, she won the Swedish Championship again in 2021.

== International career ==
As a junior player with the Japanese national under-18 team, Osawa participated in the IIHF U18 Women's World Championships at the Division I tournament in 2009 and served as team captain at the Top Division tournament in 2010. She was selected as the best forward by the directorate at the 2009 tournament and, in 2010, was selected as a top three player for Japan by the coaches.

Osawa made her senior national team debut in November 2008 at the qualification for the women's ice hockey tournament at the 2010 Winter Olympics, though Japan narrowly missed qualifying. Her first senior international point was recorded in the women's ice hockey tournament at the 2011 Asian Winter Games, the game-tying goal scored in an eventual overtime victory against China; Japan won silver at the tournament.

The 2012 IIHF Women's Challenge Cup of Asia was the first tournament for which Osawa served as Japan's captain, and she led all tournament skaters in scoring, amassing 7 points (4 goals+3 assists) in four games, to lead Japan to a gold medal.

Osawa has represented Japan at eight IIHF Women's World Championships – five at the Top Division level and three at the Division I Group A level. She made her World Championship debut at the 2009 IIHF Women's World Championship at age 17. Named an alternate captain for the 2012 IIHF Women's World Championship Division I Group A, Osawa has served as team captain for every World Championship since 2013 – at the Division I Group A tournaments in 2013 and 2017, and the Top Division tournaments in 2015, 2016, 2019, and 2021.

Osawa captained Japan to victory in the Olympic qualification tournaments in 2013 and 2017, securing placement at the 2014 Winter Olympics and 2018 Winter Olympics. At the Olympic women's ice hockey tournament in 2014, Osawa tied Hanae Kubo to top the team's scoring ranks with 1 goal and 2 assists for 3 points in five games. At the Olympic women's ice hockey tournament in 2018, she recorded one assist.

== Personal life ==
Osawa was born in Tomakomai, a port city in southern Hokkaido, Japan. A second-generation ice hockey player, her father, Hirotoshi Osawa, represented Japan at the Group B tournaments of the Ice Hockey World Championships in 1989, 1990, and 1991.

A graduate of Tomakomai Komazawa University, Osawa has worked for Dynax Corporation, a Tomakomai-based automotive parts manufacturer, since 2014.
