= Ami Nakamura =

Japanese ice hockey player

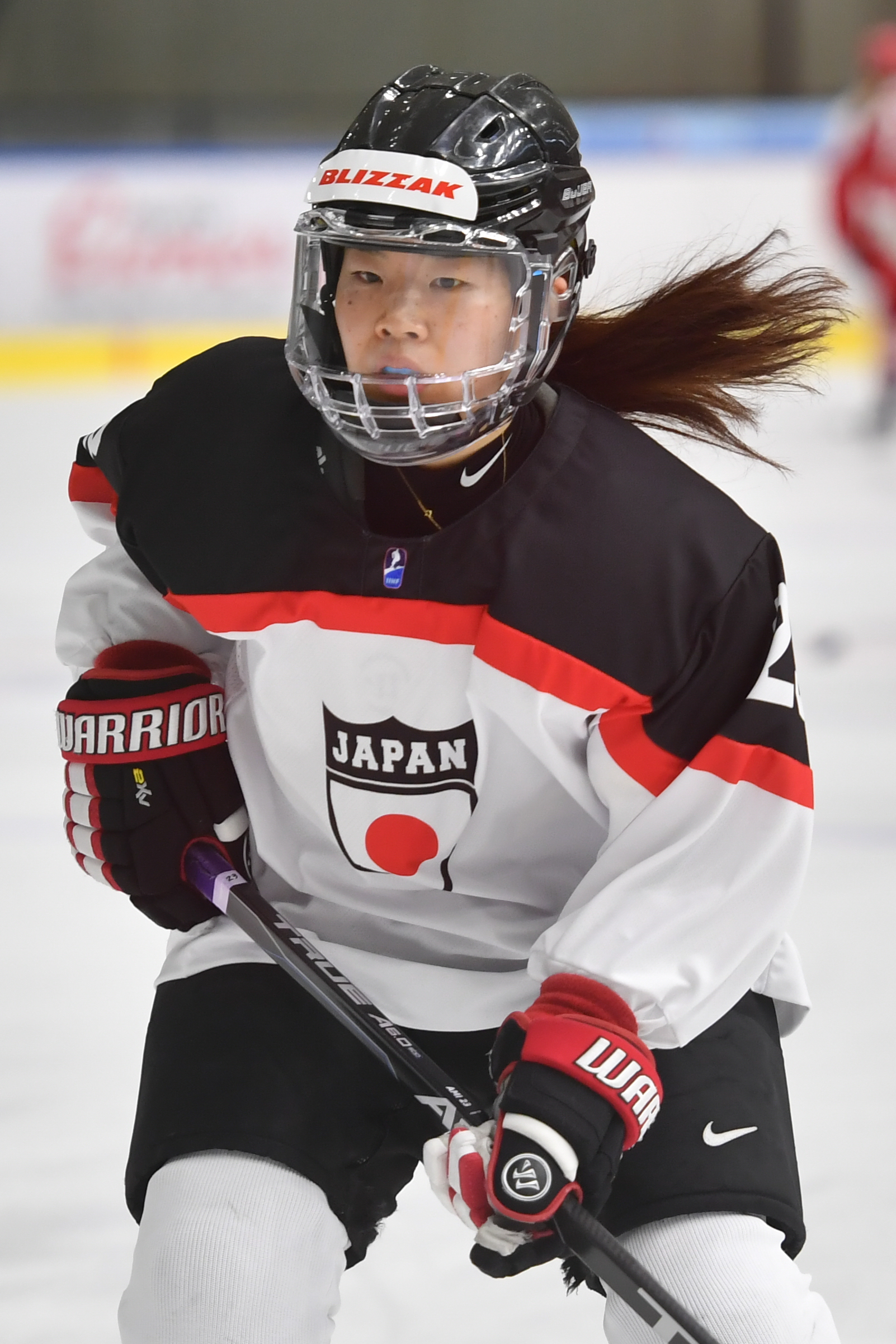
- Born: November 15, 1987 (age 37)
- Height: 5 ft 4 in (163 cm)
- Weight: 140 lb (64 kg; 10 st 0 lb)
- Position: Forward
- Shot: Left
- J-League team: Seibu Princess Rabbits
- National team: Japan
- Playing career: 2007–2015

Ami Nakamura (中村 亜実, Nakamura Ami, born November 15, 1987) is a Japanese ice hockey player for Seibu Princess Rabbits and the Japanese national team. She participated at the 2015 IIHF Women's World Championship.

Nakamura competed at both the 2014 and the 2018 Winter Olympics.

== International goals ==
No.	Date	Venue	Opponent	Score	Result	Competition
1.	28 January 2011	Almaty, Kazakhstan	South Korea	1–0	10–0	2011 Asian Winter Games
2.	18 February 2017	Sapporo, Japan	Kazakhstan	1–0	6–0	2017 Asian Winter Games
3.	18 February 2017	Sapporo, Japan	Kazakhstan	6–0	6–0	2017 Asian Winter Games
4.	21 February 2017	Sapporo, Japan	Hong Kong	1–0	46–0	2017 Asian Winter Games
5.	21 February 2017	Sapporo, Japan	Hong Kong	3–0	46–0	2017 Asian Winter Games
6.	21 February 2017	Sapporo, Japan	Hong Kong	4–0	46–0	2017 Asian Winter Games
7.	21 February 2017	Sapporo, Japan	Hong Kong	14–0	46–0	2017 Asian Winter Games
8.	21 February 2017	Sapporo, Japan	Hong Kong	22–0	46–0	2017 Asian Winter Games
9.	21 February 2017	Sapporo, Japan	Hong Kong	26–0	46–0	2017 Asian Winter Games
10.	21 February 2017	Sapporo, Japan	Hong Kong	28–0	46–0	2017 Asian Winter Games
11.	21 February 2017	Sapporo, Japan	Hong Kong	43–0	46–0	2017 Asian Winter Games
12.	23 February 2017	Sapporo, Japan	Thailand	5–0	37–0	2017 Asian Winter Games
13.	23 February 2017	Sapporo, Japan	Thailand	26–0	37–0	2017 Asian Winter Games
14.	23 February 2017	Sapporo, Japan	Thailand	29–0	37–0	2017 Asian Winter Games
15.	9 February 2017	Tomakomai, Japan	Austria	6–1	6–1	2018 Winter Olympics qualification
16.	11 February 2017	Tomakomai, Japan	France	1–0	4–1	2018 Winter Olympics qualification
