= Moeko Fujimoto =

Japanese ice hockey player (born 1992)

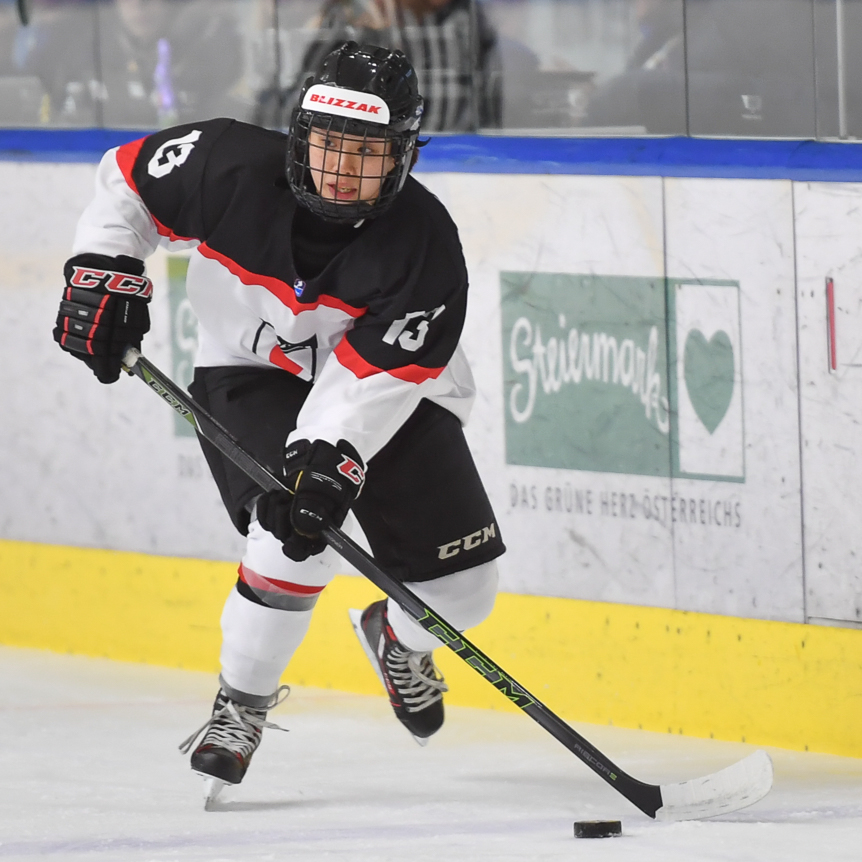
- Born: 5 August 1992 (age 34) Tomakomai, Japan
- Height: 1.56 m (5 ft 1 in)
- Weight: 56 kg (123 lb; 8 st 11 lb)
- Position: Forward
- Shoots: Left
- WJIHL team Former teams: Toyota Cygnus; DK Peregrine; Espoo Blues
- National team: Japan
- Playing career: 2010–present
Medal record
Women's ice hockey
Representing Japan
Universiade
| Bronze medal – third place | 2015 Granada |
Asian Winter Games
| Gold medal – first place | 2017 Sapporo | Team |
| Silver medal – second place | 2011 Astana-Almaty | Team |
Challenge Cup of Asia
| Gold medal – first place | 2012 China |
| Gold medal – first place | 2011 Japan |
| Silver medal – second place | 2010 China |

Moeko Fujimoto (藤本 もえこ, Fujimoto Moeko; born 5 August 1992) is a Japanese ice hockey forward and member of the Japan women's national ice hockey team, currently playing with Toyota Cygnus of the Women's Japan Ice Hockey League (WJIHL) and the All-Japan Women's Ice Hockey Championship.

== International career ==
Fujimoto was selected for the Japan women's national ice hockey team in the 2014 Winter Olympics. She played in all five games, not recording a point. She also played for Japan in the qualifying event.

Fujimoto also competed at the 2018 Winter Olympics.

As of 2015, Fujimoto has also appeared for Japan at two IIHF Women's World Championships, with the first in 2013.

Fujimoto made two appearances for the Japan women's national under-18 ice hockey team at the IIHF World Women's U18 Championships, with the first in 2009.

As a member of the Espoo Blues Naiset, she won the Finnish Championship in 2015 and a bronze medal at the 2015 IIHF European Women's Champions Cup.

== Career statistics ==
=== International career ===
Through 2014–15 season

| Year | Team | Event | GP | G | A | Pts | PIM |
|---|---|---|---|---|---|---|---|
| 2009 | Japan U18 | U18 DI | 4 | 1 | 2 | 3 | 8 |
| 2010 | Japan U18 | U18 | 5 | 1 | 1 | 2 | 0 |
| 2012 | Japan | WW DIA | 5 | 0 | 1 | 1 | 2 |
| 2013 | Japan | OlyQ | 3 | 0 | 0 | 0 | 0 |
| 2013 | Japan | WW DIA | 5 | 2 | 0 | 2 | 0 |
| 2014 | Japan | Oly | 5 | 0 | 0 | 0 | 0 |
| 2015 | Japan | WW Qual. | 3 | 1 | 0 | 1 | 0 |
