= Haruka Toko =

Japanese ice hockey player (born 1997)

Haruka Toko 床 秦留可
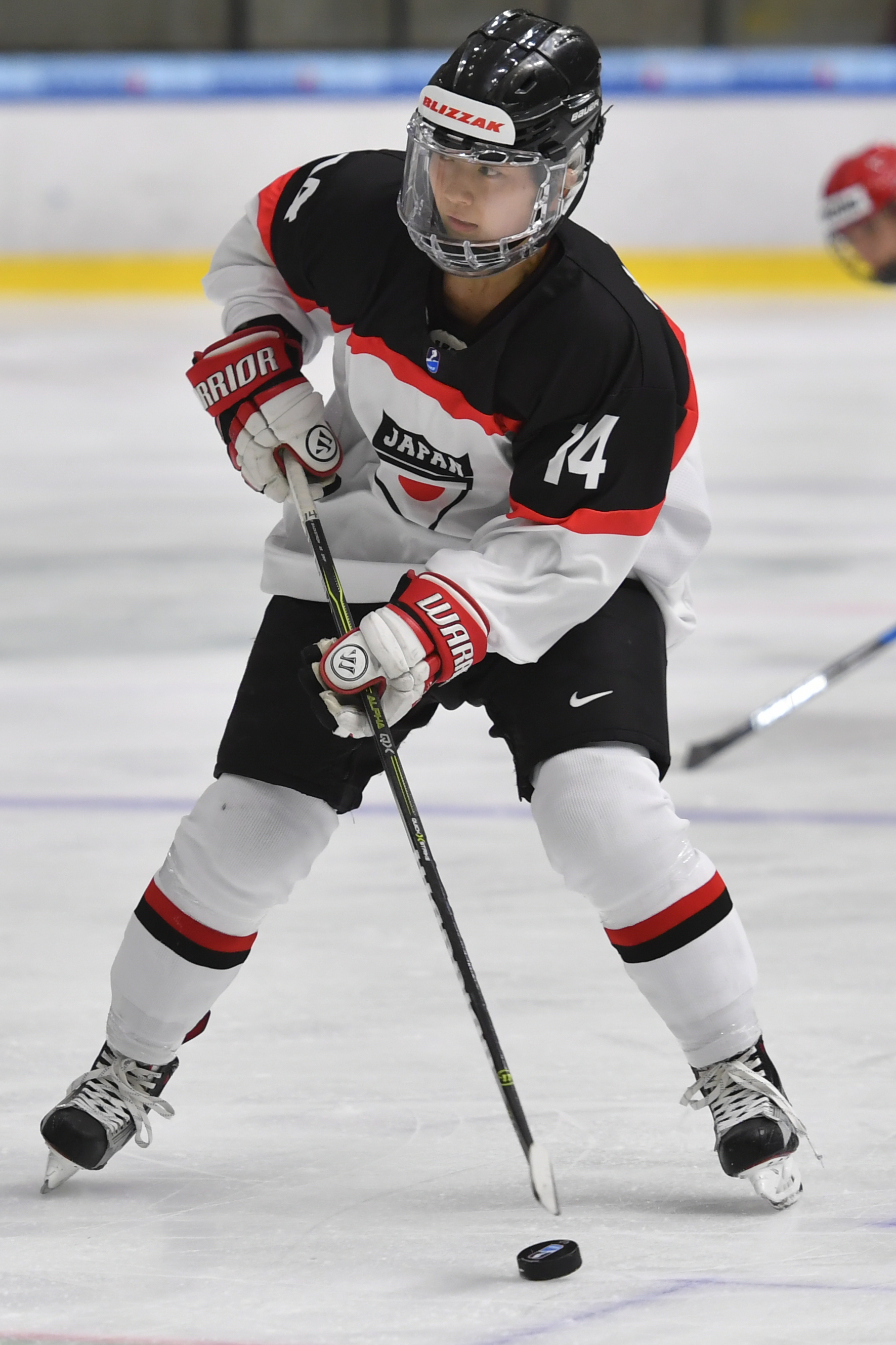
- Toko in 2017
- Born: 16 March 1997 (age 29) Hokkaido, Japan
- Height: 1.67 m (5 ft 6 in)
- Weight: 64 kg (141 lb; 10 st 1 lb)
- Position: Forward
- Shoots: Left
- SDHL team Former teams: Linköping HC; Seibu Princess Rabbits
- National team: Japan
- Playing career: 2014–present
Medal record
Asian Winter Games
Gold medal – first place	2017 Sapporo	Team

Haruka Toko (床 秦留可, Toko Haruka; born 16 March 1997) is a Japanese ice hockey player and member of the Japanese national ice hockey team.

== Career ==
Toko currently plays in the Swedish Women's Hockey League (SDHL) with Linköping HC. She has played with the Seibu Princess Rabbits of the Women's Japan Ice Hockey League (WJIHL) and All-Japan Women's Ice Hockey Championship.

With Team Japan, she participated in the 2015 IIHF Women's World Championship and in the 2018 Winter Olympics.

== Family ==
Toko’s father also represented Japan in Ice Hockey, playing at the 1991 Men’s Ice Hockey World Championship.

Her older sister, Ayaka, and younger brother, Yutaka, also play Ice Hockey and have represented Japan.

Ayaka Toko plays with Haruka on the Linköping HC team.
