= Naho Terashima =

Japanese ice hockey player

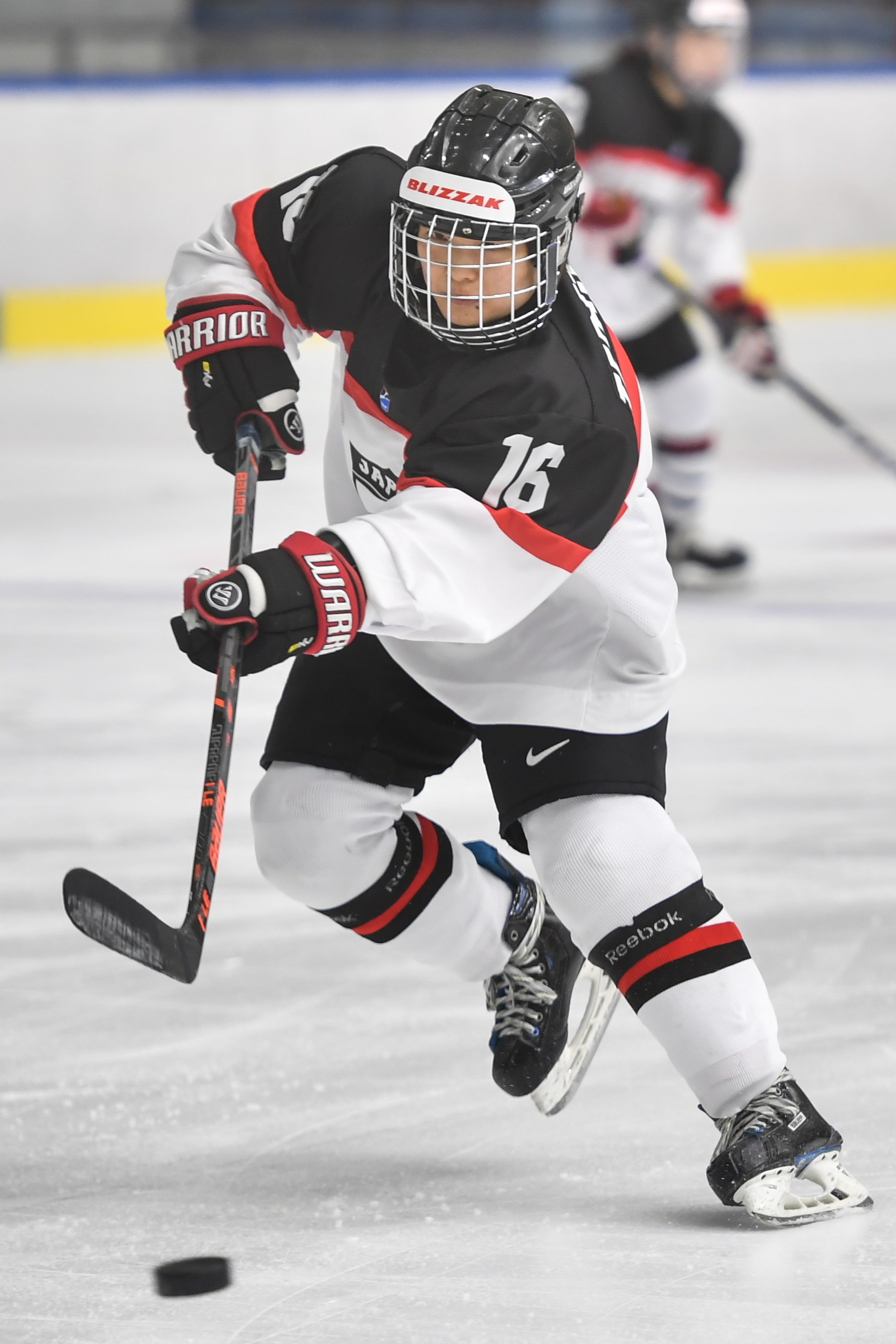
- Born: May 2, 1993 (age 31)
- Height: 1.57 m (5 ft 2 in)
- Weight: 56 kg (123 lb; 8 st 11 lb)
- Position: Forward
- Shoots: Left
- J-League team: Daishin Hockey Club
- National team: Japan

Naho Terashima (寺島 奈穂, Terashima Naho, born May 2, 1993) is a Japanese ice hockey player for Daishin Hockey Club and the Japanese national team. She participated at the 2015 IIHF Women's World Championship.

Terashima competed at the 2018 Winter Olympics.
