= Park Chae-lin =

South Korean ice hockey player

- Born: December 17, 1998 (age 26); South Korea
- Height: 158 cm (5 ft 2 in)
- Weight: 52 kg (115 lb; 8 st 3 lb)
- Position: Defence
- Shoots: Left
- KWHL team: Ice Beat
- National team: South Korea and Korea
- Playing career: 2014–present

Park Chae-lin (born 17 December 1998) is a South Korean ice hockey player. She competed in the 2018 Winter Olympics.
