= Haruna Yoneyama =

Japanese ice hockey player

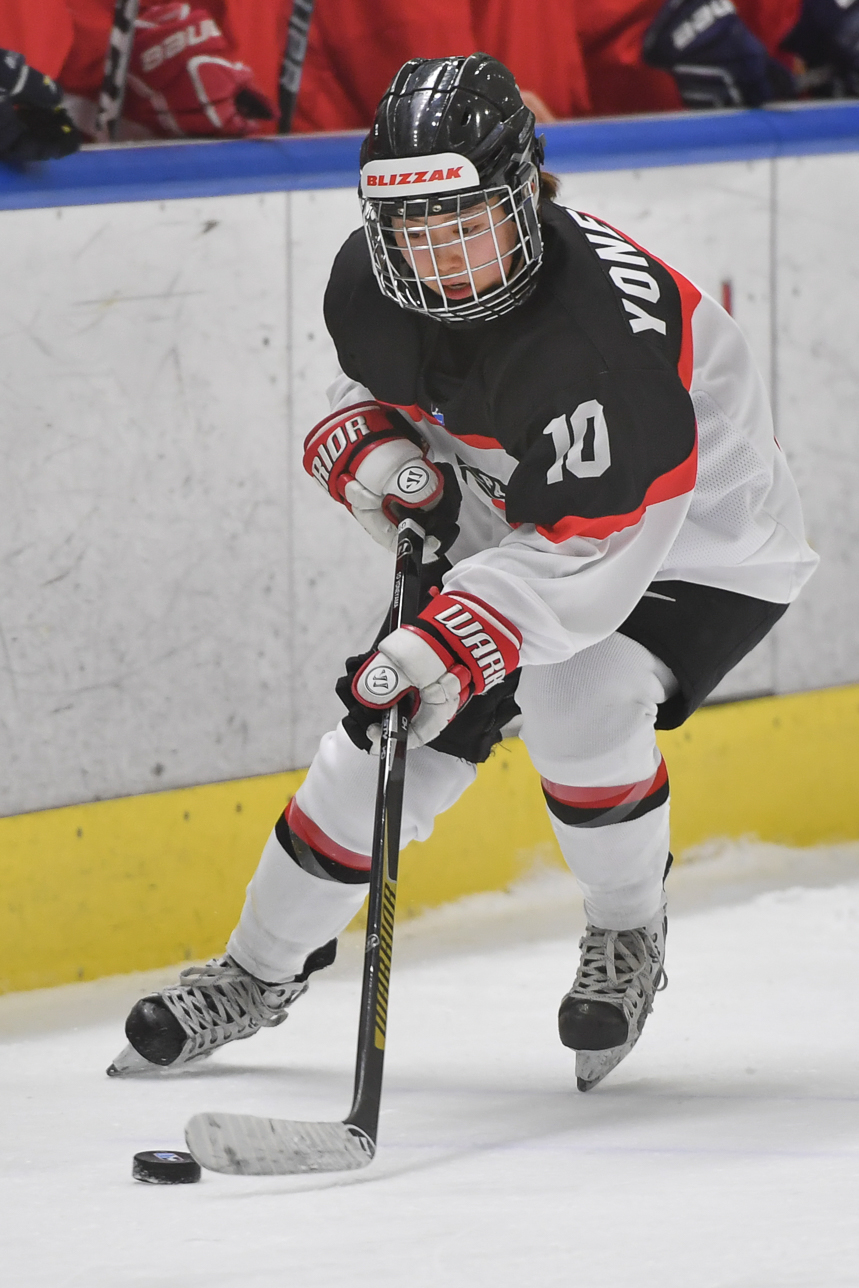
- Yoneyama in 2017
- Born: 7 November 1991 (age 33); Hokkaido, Japan
- Height: 1.60 m (5 ft 3 in)
- Weight: 53 kg (117 lb; 8 st 5 lb)
- Position: Forward
- Shoots: Left
- J-League team: DK Peregrine
- National team: Japan
- Playing career: 2008–present

Haruna Yoneyama (米山 知奈, Yoneyama Haruna, born 7 November 1991) is a Japanese ice hockey player for the DK Peregrine and the Japanese national team. She participated at the 2015 IIHF Women's World Championship.

Yoneyama competed at both the 2014 and the 2018 Winter Olympics.
