= Aina Takeuchi =

Japanese ice hockey player

- Born: August 16, 1991 (age 34) Musashino, Japan
- Height: 5 ft 5 in (165 cm)
- Weight: 139 lb (63 kg; 9 st 13 lb)
- Position: Defence
- Shoots: Left
- CWHL team: Calgary Inferno
- National team: Japan
- Playing career: 2009–present

Aina Takeuchi (竹内 愛奈, Takeuchi Aina; born August 16, 1991 in Musashino) is a Japanese ice hockey defender.

== International career ==
Takeuchi was selected for the Japan women's national ice hockey team in the 2014 Winter Olympics. She played in all five games, recording one assist.

Takeuchi also played for Japan in the qualifying event for the 2014 Winter Olympics.

Takeuchi competed at the 2018 Winter Olympics.

As of 2015, Takeuchi has also appeared for Japan at two IIHF Women's World Championships, with the first in 2012.

Takeuchi made one appearance for the Japan women's national under-18 ice hockey team at the IIHF World Women's U18 Championships, in 2009.

=== CWHL ===
Takeuchi was drafted by the Calgary Inferno in the 2015 CWHL Draft. Appearing with the Inferno in the 2016 Clarkson Cup finals, she joined teammate Kanae Aoki as the first women from Japan to win the Clarkson, as the Inferno prevailed in a convincing 8–3 final against Les Canadiennes de Montreal.

== Career statistics ==
=== International career ===
Through 2014–15 season

Year	Team	Event	GP	G	A	Pts	PIM
2009	Japan U18	U18 DI	4	0	2	2	2
2012	Japan	WW DIA	5	0	0	0	4
2013	Japan	OlyQ	3	0	0	0	6
2013	Japan	WW DIA	5	0	0	0	2
2014	Japan	Oly	5	0	1	1	4
2015	Japan	WW Qual.	3	0	1	1	2
