= Sarah Murray (ice hockey) =

American ice hockey player and coach

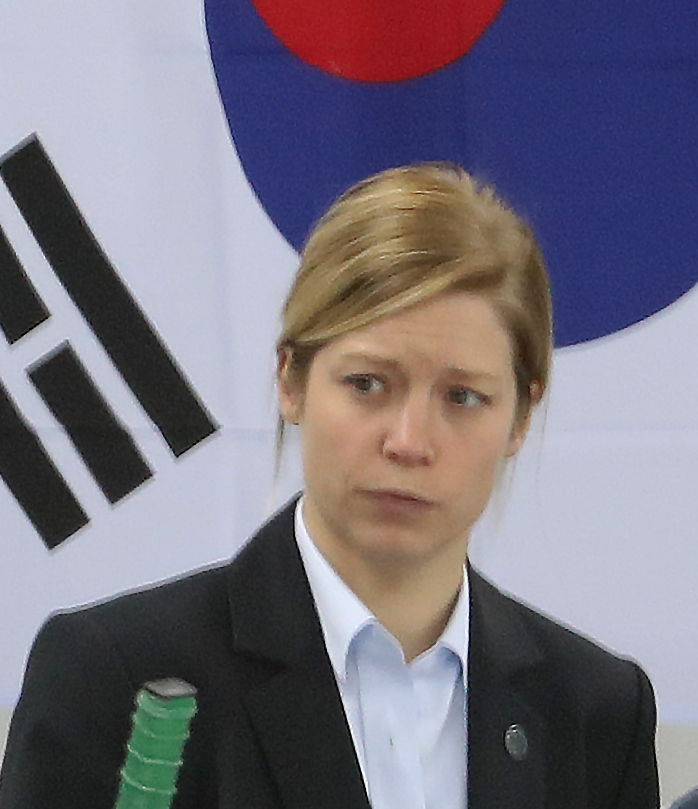
- Murray in 2017

Current position
- Title: Head coach
- Team: Saint Mary's Cardinals
- Conference: MIAC

Biographical details
- Born: April 28, 1988 (age 38); Faribault, Minnesota, U.S.
- Education: University of Minnesota Duluth

Playing career
- 2006–2010: Minnesota Duluth Bulldogs
- 2010–2012: Ladies Team Lugano
- 2014–2015: ZSC Lions
- Position: Defense

Coaching career (HC unless noted)
- 2014–2018: South Korea women's national
- 2017–2018: Korea women's unified
- 2019–: Saint Mary's Cardinals

Sarah Murray (born April 28, 1988) is a Canadian-American ice hockey coach and the head coach of the women's ice hockey team of Saint Mary's University of Minnesota in the Minnesota Intercollegiate Athletic Conference (MIAC) of the NCAA Division III. She served as head coach of the South Korean women's national ice hockey team during 2014 to 2018 and was the head coach of the Korean unified team at the 2018 Winter Olympics.

== Playing career ==
Murray was born April 28, 1988, in Faribault, Minnesota, to Ruth and Andy Murray. She played hockey at Shattuck-Saint Mary's, a private parochial and college-preparatory school known for its ice hockey program.

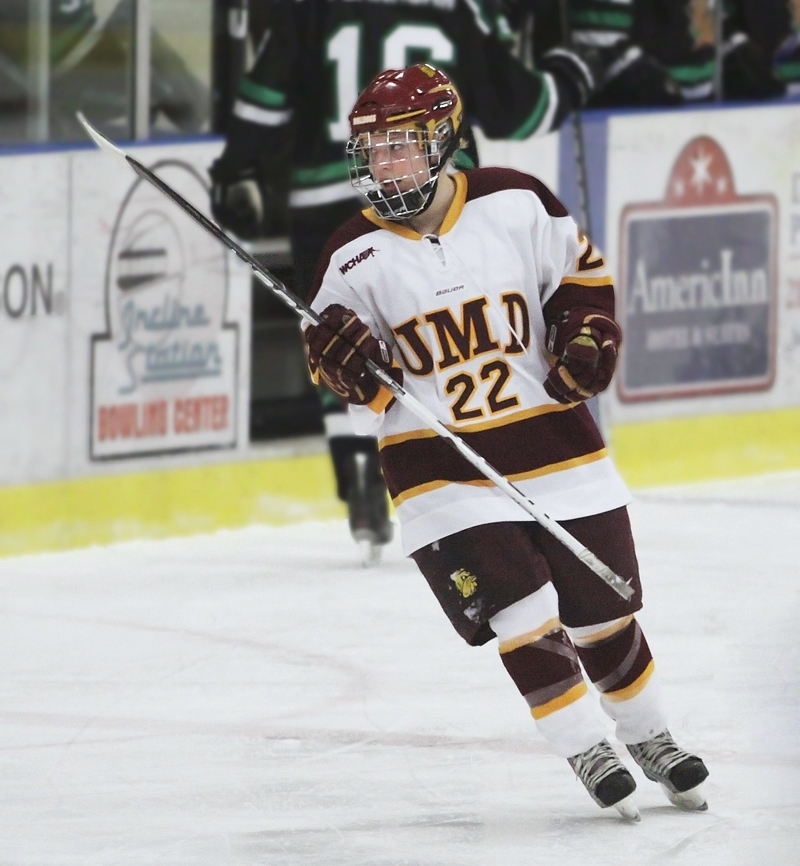
Murray after scoring in a game against the University of North Dakota on February 27, 2010

As a rookie with the Minnesota Duluth Bulldogs women's ice hockey program in the 2006–07 season, she broke her ankle in the first round of the Western Collegiate Hockey Association (WCHA) Conference Playoffs. Following the injury, Murray skated in 108 consecutive games and, in total, played 153 career games with the Bulldogs, ranking her in a third place tie all-time among program alums. Murray was a two-time NCAA Women's Ice Hockey Tournament national champion with the Bulldogs, winning the title in 2008 and 2010.

== Coaching career ==
Murray became the head coach of the South Korean national women's ice hockey team in 2014. She was part of Team Red's coaching staff at the 2016 High Performance Camp, held in Vierumäki, Finland. Other members of Team Red's coaching staff included mentor-coach Peter Smith, assistant coach Eva-Maria Verworner, and athlete-ambassador Lyndsey Fry, among others. Murray ceased coaching the South Korea ice hockey team in October 2018.

On June 5, 2019, she was named head coach of the Saint Mary's University of Minnesota Cardinals women's ice hockey team.

== Personal life ==
Her father was the head coach of the Western Michigan Broncos men's ice hockey team and the former head coach of the St. Louis Blues and Los Angeles Kings hockey teams in the National Hockey League (NHL). Her brothers Brady and Jordy also played hockey. Brady competed with the University of North Dakota men's ice hockey team and was a fifth-round draft pick of the Los Angeles Kings in the 2003 NHL entry draft. Jordy also played at the collegiate level, competing at the University of Wisconsin. Murray and her two brothers hold US–Canadian dual citizenship.

== Career stats ==
=== NCAA ===
Season	Games	Goals	Assists	Points	PIM	GWG	PPG	SHG
2006–07	34	0	2	2	N/A	0	0	0
2007–08	39	1	3	4	12	0	0	0
2008–09	39	0	6	6	6	0	0	0
2009–10	41	2	4	6	12	0	0	0

== Awards and honors ==
- WCHA Scholar Athlete award (2008)
- WCHA Scholar Athlete award (2009)
- WCHA Scholar Athlete award (2010)
