= 2025 IIHF Women's Asia Championship =

Tournament details
- Host country: China
- City: Beijing
- Venue: 1 (in 1 host city)
- Dates: 31 October – 3 November 2024
- Teams: 4

Final positions
- Champions: Japan (1st title)
- Runners-up: China
- Third place: Kazakhstan
- Fourth place: South Korea

Tournament statistics
- Games played: 6
- Goals scored: 43 (7.17 per game)
- Attendance: 5,324 (887 per game)
- Scoring leader: (Japan) Rui Ukita (8 points)

Official website
- 2025 IIHF Ice Hockey Women's Asia Championship

The 2025 IIHF Women's Asia Championship was the first edition of the women's ice hockey tournament organized by the International Ice Hockey Federation (IIHF) as part of the IIHF Asia Championship Series. The tournament was played at Shougang Ice Rink in Beijing, China, from 31 October to 3 November 2024. Japan won the tournament after winning all the games.

== Creation ==
The tournament was first proposed in May 2023 after collaboration was agreed between China, Japan, Kazakhstan and South Korea with the IIHF to grow Asian Ice Hockey. The four nations have agreed to play this tournament for four years.

== Venue ==
The venue was the Shougang Ice Rink in Beijing, China.

== Final standings ==
Pos	Team	Pld	W	OTW	OTL	L	GF	GA	GD	Pts
1	Japan	3	3	0	0	0	25	0	+25	9
2	China (H)	3	2	0	0	1	9	5	+4	6
3	Kazakhstan	3	0	1	0	2	5	17	−12	2
4	South Korea	3	0	0	1	2	4	21	−17	1

Source: IIHF
(H) Host

== Match results ==
All times are local (Beijing Time – UTC+8).

31 October 2024; 16:00	South Korea	0–12 (0–3, 0–7, 0–2)	Japan	Shougang Ice Rink, Beijing; Attendance: 103

Kim Yeonju
Goalies
Miyuu Masuhara
Referees:
(Japan) Miyuki Nakayama
(China) Song Meina
Linesmen:
(Japan) Kumiko Matsuo
(South Korea) Park Jung Yoon

0–1	03:02 – Shiga (H. Yamashita, Sato)
0–2	05:15 – Ukita (Rio Noro, Sato)
0–3	17:35 – pp – Seki (Ukita, Shiga)
0–4	22:17 – Wajima (Ukita, Shinoda)
0–5	23:39 – Nagaoka (Ito, Sato)
0–6	26:08 – Seki (S. Yamashita, Enomoto)
0–7	29:13 – Kishibe (Wajima)
0–8	29:50 – Enomoto (H. Yamashita, Shinoda)
0–9	31:26 – Rir. Noro (S. Yamashita, Seki)
0–10	33:38 – pp – Shiga (Ukita, Rio Noro)
0–11	58:04 – pp – Ito (Sato, Koyama)
0–12	58:36 – Ukita (Shinoda)

16 min
Penalties
2 min
2
Shots
51

31 October 2024; 19:30	China	5–0 (3–0, 1–0, 1–0)	Kazakhstan	Shougang Ice Rink, Beijing; Attendance: 584

Lai Guimin
Goalies
Arina Chshyokolova
Referees:
(Japan) Anna Kuroda
(Malaysia) Mei Wah Wan
Linesmen:
(Australia) Bethany Bowshall
(China) Liu Lu

Qu – 00:56	1–0
Zhang B. (Hu, Wu) – 5:18	2–0
Fang (Yu, Zhao Q.) – 5:59	3–0
Fang (Guan, Yu) – pp – 34:08	4–0
Zhang M. (Qu, Kong)	5–0

4 min
Penalties
14 min
37
Shots
18

2 November 2024; 16:00	Japan	8–0 (2–0, 3–0, 3–0)	Kazakhstan	Shougang Ice Rink, Beijing; Attendance: 397

Riko Kawaguchi
Goalies
Arina Chshyokolova
Referees:
(Japan) Anna Kuroda
(China) Song Meina
Linesmen:
(Australia) Bethany Bowshall
(South Korea) Park Jung Yoon

Sato (Rio Noro, Koyama) – 1:05	1–0
Rio Noro (Sato) – pp – 3:44	2–0
Kurosu (Enomoto) – 22:58	3–0
H. Yamashita (Seki) – 23:52	4–0
Ukita (Koyama, Rio Noro) – 32:47	5–0
Rio Noro (Ukita, Kishibe) – 44:39	6–0
Maeda (Wajima, Kishibe) – 53:48	7–0
Kishibe (Enomoto, Kurosu) – 58:55	8–0

0 min
Penalties
6 min
55
Shots
5

2 November 2024; 19:30	China	4–0 (3–0, 1–0, 0–0)	South Korea	Shougang Ice Rink, Beijing; Attendance: 1,452

Wang Yuqing
Goalies
Jongju Park
Referees:
(Japan) Miyuki Nakayama
(Malaysia) Mei Wah Wan
Linesmen:
(China) Liu Lu
(Japan) Kumiko Matsuo

Yang (Kong, Hou) – 2:04	1–0
Zhang M. (Yu, Guan) – pp – 11:33	2–0
Kong (Yu, Zhang M.) – pp – 12:45	3–0
Zhang B. (Zhao Q., Hu) – pp – 37:32	4–0

6 min
Penalties
14 min
21
Shots
15

3 November 2024; 16:00	Kazakhstan	5–4 GWS (2–1, 2–1, 0–2) (OT: 0–0) (SO: 1–0)	South Korea	Shougang Ice Rink, Beijing; Attendance: 832

Arina Chshyokolova
Goalies
Park Jongju
Kim Yeonju
Referees:
(Japan) Anna Kuroda
(Malaysia) Mei Wah Wan
Linesmen:
(Australia) Bethany Bowshall
(South Korea) Park Jung Yoon

M. Sayakhatkyzy (Shegay, Moldabay) – 8:36	1–0
	1–1	9:41 – Park Ji. (Choi, Han)
D. Sayakhatkyzy (Yakovleva, Filimonova) – 17:14	2–1
Shegay (M. Sayakhatkyzy, Tursynova) – 33:47	3–1
Moldabay (Tursynova, Orazbayeva) – 35:22	4–1
	4–2	39:56 – ea – Park Jonga. (Lee E. #13, Lee E. #16)
	4–3	54:14 – Han (Choi, Kim S.)
	4–4	56:46 – Park Ju. (Park Jonga.)
Orazbayeva – SO	5–4

M. Sayakhatkyzy (miss)
Shegay (miss)
Filimonova (miss)
Aldabergenova (miss)
D. Sayakhatkyzy (miss)
Orazbayeva
Shootout
(miss) Lee E. #16
(miss) Park Jonga.
(miss) Choi
(miss) Park Ji.
(miss) Han
(miss) Park Jonga.
10 min
Penalties
4 min
18
Shots
32

3 November 2024; 19:30	Japan	5–0 (1–0, 0–0, 4–0)	China	Shougang Ice Rink, Beijing; Attendance: 1,956

Miyuu Masuhara
Goalies
Wang Yuqing
Referees:
(Japan) Miyuki Nakayama
(China) Song Meina
Linesmen:
(Japan) Kumiko Matsuo
(China) Liu Lu

Rio Noro – 14:55	1–0
Nagaoka (Enomoto, Sato) – 42:28	2–0
Ukita – 49:31	3–0
Ito (S. Yamashita, Rir. Noro) – 54:49	4–0
Seki (Wajima, Shinoda) – 55:37	5–0

8 min
Penalties
4 min
48
Shots
12

== Awards and statistics ==
=== Awards ===
Best players selected by the directorate

Position	Player
Goaltender	(China) Wang Yuqing
Defender	(Japan) Shiori Yamashita
Forward	(Japan) Rui Ukita

Source: IIHF

Best player of each team selected by coaches

Team	Player
China	Yu Baiwei
Japan	Rui Ukita
Kazakhstan	Arina Chshyokolova
South Korea	Park Jongah

Source: IIHF

=== Scoring leaders ===
List shows the top-ten scorers, sorted by points, then goals.

GP = Games played; G = Goals; A = Assists; Pts = Points; PIM = Penalties in minutes; +/− = Plus/minus; POS = Position

Rank		Player	GP	G	A	Pts	PIM	+/−	POS
1	(Japan)	Rui Ukita	3	4	4	8	2	+8	F
2	(Japan)	Rio Noro	3	3	4	7	0	+9	F
3	(Japan)	Kohane Sato	3	1	6	7	0	+7	D
4	(Japan)	Kanami Seki	3	3	2	5	4	+8	D
5	(Japan)	Yoshino Enomoto	3	1	4	5	0	+5	F
6	(Japan)	Sarasa Kishibe	3	2	2	4	0	+8	D
7	(Japan)	Yumeka Wajima	3	1	3	4	2	+8	F
8	(Japan)	An Shinoda	3	0	4	4	0	+7	D
8	(China)	Yu Baiwei	3	0	4	4	0	–1	D
10	(Japan)	Makoto Ito	3	2	1	3	0	+3	F
10	(Japan)	Aoi Shiga	3	2	1	3	0	+5	D
10	(China)	Zhang Mengying	3	2	1	3	2	–2	F

Park Jong-ah was the leading scorer for South Korea, having tallied one goal and one assist for two points in two games played. She ranked twentieth on the list of tournament scoring leaders. Her statistics also included four penalty minutes and a plus/minus of zero.

Dariya Moldabay, Munira Sayakhatkyzy, and Alexandra Shegay tied as the leading scorers for Kazakhstan, having each scored one goal and one assist for two points in three games played. They ranked 21st on the list of tournament scoring leaders. Moldabay recorded two penalty minutes and was –2, M. Sayakhatkyzy recorded six penalty minutes and was –4, and Shegay recorded four penalty minutes and was ±0.

=== Goaltenders ===
Goaltenders playing at least forty percent of their team's minutes are included in this list, sorted by save percentage.

TOI = Time on ice (minutes:seconds); SOG = Shots on goal; GA = Goals against; Sv% = Save percentage; GAA = Goals against average; SO = Shutouts

Rank		Player	TOI	SOG	GA	Sv%	GAA	SO
1	(Japan)	Riko Kawaguchi	90:47	6	0	100.00	0.00	1
2	(Japan)	Miyuu Masuhara	89:13	13	0	100.00	0.00	1
3	(China)	Wang Yuqing	120:00	63	5	92.06	2.50	1
4	(Kazakhstan)	Arina Chshyokolova	185:00	124	17	86.29	5.51	0
5	(South Korea)	Park Jongju	122:23	62	12	80.65	5.88	0

== Rosters ==
Rank	Team	Roster
1	Japan	Goaltenders: Riko Kawaguchi, Miyuu Masuhara; Defencemen: Sarasa Kishibe, Aoi Shiga, Kohane Sato, Kanami Seki, An Shinoda, Shiori Yamashita; Forwards: Yoshino Enomoto, Makoto Ito, Remi Koyama, Wakana Kurosu, Suzuka Maeda, Marin Nagaoka, Riri Noro, Rio Noro, Ai Tada, Rui Ukita, Hikaru Yamashita, Yumeka Wajima; Head coach: Yuji Iizuka; Assistant coaches: Masahito Haruna, Yujiro Nakajimaya
2	China	Goaltenders: Lai Guimin, Wang Yuqing; Defencemen: Du Sijia, Hou Yue, Li Qianhua, Liu Chunshuang, Liu Siyang, Yu Baiwei, Zhao Qinan; Forwards: Fang Xin, Gao Ziye, Guan Yingying, Hu Jiayi, Kong Minghui, Li Ke, Qu Yue, Wang Yifan, Wu Sijia, Yang Jinglei, Zhang Biyang, Zhang Mengying, Zhao Ziyu; Head coach: Sami Haapanen; Assistant coaches: Myles Fitzgerald, Helian Yizhou, Daniel John Reja
3	Kazakhstan	Goaltenders: Polina Govtva, Arina Chshyokolova; Defencemen: Yuliya Butorina, Alina Ivanchenko, Katrin Meskini, Dariya Moldabay, Aida Olzhabayeva, Anna Pyatkova, Madina Tursynova, Alexandra Voronova, Polina Yakovleva; Forwards: Malika Aldabergenova, Pernesh Ashimova, Nadezhda Filimonova, Tatyana Koroleva, Yekaterina Kutsenko, Anastassiya Orazbayeva, Dilnaz Sayakhatkyzy, Munira Sayakhatkyzy, Alexandra Shegay, Larissa Sviridova, Sofiya Zubkova; Head coach: Alexandr Tebenkov; Assistant coaches: Zhassulan Orazbayev, Darya Dmitriyeva (goaltender)
4	South Korea	Goaltenders: Kim Yeonju, Park Jongju; Defencemen: Kim Dowon, Kim Minseo, Kim Selin, Lee Sojung, Park Juyeon, Song Heeoh; Forwards: Choi Jiyeon, Han Soojin, Kang Nara, Jung Siyun, Jung Yewon, Lee Eunji, Lee Eunji, Park Jiyoon, Park Jongah, Park Minae; Head coach: Kim Do-yun; Assistant coaches: Kim Tae-gyum, Moon Young-hoe (goaltender), Park Sang-hyun (video)
