= 2024 IIHF Women's World Championship =

2024 edition of the IIHF Women's World Championship

- Official logo of the tournament

Tournament details
- Host country: United States
- Venue: 1 (in 1 host city)
- Dates: 3–14 April
- Opened by: Joe Biden
- Teams: 10

Final positions
- Champions: Canada (13th title)
- Runners-up: United States
- Third place: Finland
- Fourth place: Czechia

Tournament statistics
- Games played: 29
- Goals scored: 148 (5.1 per game)
- Attendance: 68,112 (2,349 per game)
- Scoring leader: (United States) Alex Carpenter (10 points)

Awards
- MVP: (United States) Laila Edwards

Official website
- IIHF

The 2024 IIHF Women's World Championship was the 23rd edition of the Top Division of the Women's Ice Hockey World Championship organized by the International Ice Hockey Federation (IIHF). The tournament was contested in Utica, New York, United States from 3 to 14 April 2024 at the Adirondack Bank Center.

Canada won their record-extending 13th title after a win over the United States 6-5 in overtime.

== Venue ==
Utica
Adirondack Bank Center
Capacity: 3,860
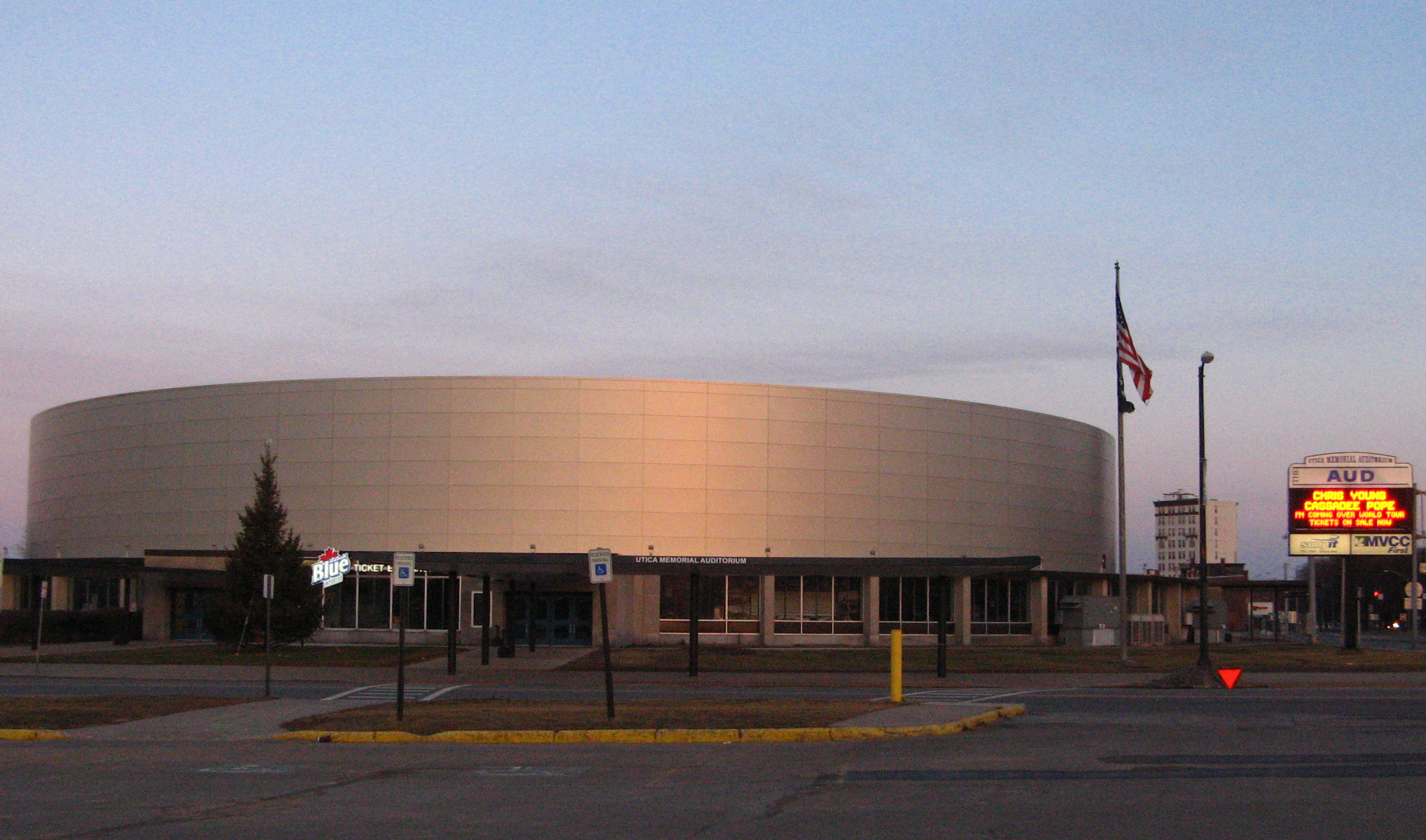

== Participants ==
Group A

- United States
- Canada
- Czechia
- Switzerland
- Finland

Group B

- Sweden
- Japan
- Germany
- China – Promoted from Division IA Group A in 2023
- Denmark – Promoted from Division IA Group A in 2023

== Format ==
The top five teams from the previous tournament were placed in Group A and the teams that finished sixth through eighth in the 2023 tournament, plus two teams promoted from 2023 Division IA, were placed in Group B. All of the teams in Group A and the top three teams from Group B continued to the knockout phase, while the bottom two teams from Group B were relegated. During the knockout stage, there was a re-seeding after the quarterfinals.

== Rosters ==
Each team's roster consisted of at least 15 skaters (forwards and defencemen) and two goaltenders and at most 20 skaters and three goaltenders. All ten participating nations, through the confirmation of their respective national associations, had to submit a "Long List" roster no later than two weeks before the tournament.

== Match officials ==
Twelve referees and linesmen were selected for the tournament.

Referees	Linesmen
(Austria) Julia Kainberger; (Canada) Jennifer Berezowski; (Canada) Cianna Lieffers; (Canada) Amy Martin; (Canada) Shauna Neary; (Czech Republic) Zuzana Svobodová; (Finland) Anniina Nurmi; (Germany) Vanessa Anselm; (United States) Melissa Doyle; (United States) Samantha Hiller; (United States) Chelsea Rapin; (United States) Amanda Tassoni	(Canada) Alex Clarke; (Canada) Laura Gutasukas; (Canada) Justine Todd; (Canada) Kirsten Welsh; (Czech Republic) Kristýna Hájková; (Czech Republic) Kamila Smetková; (Finland) Tiina Saarimäki; (France) Alexia Cheyroux; (Germany) Leonie Ernst; (Poland) Natalia Suchanek; (United States) Sarah Buckner; (United States) Melanie Gotsdiner

== Preliminary round ==
The groups were based on the final rankings from the previous tournament.

All times are local (UTC−4)

=== Group A ===
Pos	Team	Pld	W	OTW	OTL	L	GF	GA	GD	Pts	Qualification
1	United States (H)	4	3	1	0	0	16	3	+13	11	Quarterfinals
2	Canada	4	3	0	1	0	12	2	+10	10	Quarterfinals
3	Czechia	4	2	0	0	2	10	12	−2	6	Quarterfinals
4	Finland	4	1	0	0	3	9	15	−6	3	Quarterfinals
5	Switzerland	4	0	0	0	4	3	18	−15	0	Quarterfinals

Source: IIHF
Rules for classification: 1) points; 2) head-to-head points; 3) head-to-head goal difference; 4) head-to-head number of goals scored; 5) result against closest best-ranked team outside tied teams; 6) result against second-best ranked team outside tied teams; 7) seeding before tournament.
(H) Host

3 April 2024; 15:00	Finland	0–4 (0–0, 0–2, 0–2)	Czechia	Adirondack Bank Center, Utica; Attendance: 1,306

Game reference

Sanni Ahola
Goalies
Klára Peslarová
Referees:
(Canada) Shauna Neary
(United States) Chelsea Rapin
Linesmen:
(Canada) Alex Clarke
(Germany) Leonie Ernst

0–1	27:23 – Šapovalivová (Mlýnková, Hymlárová)
0–2	36:58 – Hymlárová (Radová)
0–3	56:54 – Mlýnková (Šapovalivová) (EN)
0–4	57:44 – Plosová (Tejralová) (EN)

0 min
Penalties
0 min
21
Shots
33

3 April 2024; 19:00	United States	4–0 (0–0, 2–0, 2–0)	Switzerland	Adirondack Bank Center, Utica; Attendance: 3,920

Game reference

Aerin Frankel
Goalies
Andrea Brändli
Referees:
(Canada) Cianna Lieffers
(Canada) Amy Martin
Linesmen:
(Finland) Tiina Saarimäki
(Canada) Justine Todd

Winn (Harmon, Scamurra) – 25:23	1–0
Coyne Schofield (Carpenter, Knight) – 36:00	2–0
Knight (Barnes, Harvey) (PP) – 50:47	3–0
Winn (Coyne Schofield, Knight) – 54:41	4–0

4 min
Penalties
6 min
55
Shots
11

4 April 2024; 19:00	Canada	4–1 (1–0, 2–1, 1–0)	Finland	Adirondack Bank Center, Utica; Attendance: 1,650

Game reference

Ann-Renée Desbiens
Goalies
Sanni Ahola
Referees:
(Canada) Jennifer Berezowski
(Finland) Anniina Nurmi
Linesmen:
(United States) Melanie Gotsdiner
(Czech Republic) Kristýna Hájková

Jenner (Fillier, Rattray) – 09:15	1–0
Maltais (Spooner, Shelton) – 21:58	2–0
	2–1	24:49 – Nieminen (Karvinen, Tapani)
J. Gosling (O'Neill, Serdachny) – 39:28	3–1
Shelton (Bell, Jenner) (PP) – 57:40	4–1

12 min
Penalties
8 min
36
Shots
33

5 April 2024; 15:00	Switzerland	0–3 (0–2, 0–0, 0–1)	Canada	Adirondack Bank Center, Utica; Attendance: 2,141

Game reference

Andrea Brändli
Goalies
Emerance Maschmeyer
Referees:
(United States) Chelsea Rapin
(United States) Amanda Tassoni
Linesmen:
(Canada) Alex Clarke
(Poland) Natalia Suchanek

0–1	01:10 – Maltais (Spooner, Fast)
0–2	36:58 – Nurse
0–3	59:41 – Fillier (Poulin, Jenner) (EN)

2 min
Penalties
8 min
17
Shots
45

5 April 2024; 19:00	Czechia	0–6 (0–1, 0–2, 0–3)	United States	Adirondack Bank Center, Utica; Attendance: 3,880

Game reference

Klára Peslarová
Goalies
Nicole Hensley
Referees:
(Austria) Julia Kainberger
(Finland) Anniina Nurmi
Linesmen:
(Canada) Laura Gutasukas
(Czech Republic) Kristýna Hájková

0–1	06:49 – Carpenter (Coyne Schofield)
0–2	36:29 – Carpenter (Harvey, Murphy)
0–3	37:28 – Edwards (Curl)
0–4	43:42 – Edwards (Coyne Schofield, Harvey) (SH)
0–5	45:03 – Heise
0–6	50:24 – Carpenter (Harvey, Barnes) (PP)

8 min
Penalties
37 min
19
Shots
48

6 April 2024; 19:00	Finland	3–5 (2–2, 1–2, 0–1)	United States	Adirondack Bank Center, Utica; Attendance: 3,902

Game reference

Anni Keisala
Goalies
Aerin Frankel
Referees:
(Canada) Shauna Neary
(Czech Republic) Zuzana Svobodová
Linesmen:
(Finland) Tiina Saarimäki
(Canada) Kirsten Welsh

Holopainen (Hiirikoski) (PP) – 06:54	1–0
	1–1	07:58 – Murphy (Bilka, Harvey)
	1–2	18:16 – Knight (Edwards, Heise) (PP)
Holopainen (Karvinen, Laitinen) (PP) – 19:35	2–2
	2–3	27:42 – Heise (Murphy)
	2–4	31:40 – Coyne Schofield (Winn)
Sundelin (Tapani) – 39:20	3–4
	3–5	40:15 – Coyne Schofield (Carpenter, Knight)

12 min
Penalties
12 min
12
Shots
45

7 April 2024; 15:00	Canada	5–0 (3–0, 1–0, 1–0)	Czechia	Adirondack Bank Center, Utica; Attendance: 2,004

Game reference

Ann-Renée Desbiens
Goalies
Klára Peslarová
Referees:
(United States) Melissa Doyle
(United States) Samantha Hiller
Linesmen:
(United States) Sarah Buckner
(France) Alexia Cheyroux

Serdachny (O'Neill) – 02:07	1–0
O'Neill (Nurse) (EA) – 09:00	2–0
O'Neill – 17:30	3–0
Fast (Rattray, Nurse) – 24:31	4–0
Stacey (Larocque, Turnbull) – 45:43	5–0

4 min
Penalties
8 min
42
Shots
13

8 April 2024; 15:00	Switzerland	2–5 (1–2, 0–2, 1–1)	Finland	Adirondack Bank Center, Utica; Attendance: 1,319

Game reference

Andrea Brändli
Goalies
Sanni Ahola
Referees:
(Austria) Julia Kainberger
(Canada) Amy Martin
Linesmen:
(United States) Sarah Buckner
(United States) Melanie Gotsdiner

	0–1	00:42 – Nieminen
Stalder (Baechler, Christen) – 14:14	1–1
	1–2	19:52 – Savolainen (Tulus, Hiirikoski) (PP)
	1–3	24:51 – Vanhanen (Laitinen, Hiirikoski)
	1–4	33:58 – Tapani (Hiirikoski)
Leemann (Zimmermann, Wetli) – 50:49	2–4
	2–5	58:31 – Hiirikoski (EN)

6 min
Penalties
0 min
15
Shots
33

8 April 2024; 19:00	United States	1–0 OT (0–0, 0–0, 0–0) (OT: 1–0)	Canada	Adirondack Bank Center, Utica; Attendance: 4,017

Game reference
Aerin Frankel	Goalies	Ann-Renée Desbiens	Referees: (Canada) Shauna Neary (United States) Amanda Tassoni; Linesmen: (Canada) Alex Clarke (Canada) Kirsten Welsh
Simms (Harvey) – 63:38 / 1–0			Referees: (Canada) Shauna Neary (United States) Amanda Tassoni; Linesmen: (Canada) Alex Clarke (Canada) Kirsten Welsh
8 min	Penalties	6 min	Referees: (Canada) Shauna Neary (United States) Amanda Tassoni; Linesmen: (Canada) Alex Clarke (Canada) Kirsten Welsh
30	Shots	26	Referees: (Canada) Shauna Neary (United States) Amanda Tassoni; Linesmen: (Canada) Alex Clarke (Canada) Kirsten Welsh

9 April 2024; 15:00	Czechia	6–1 (1–1, 2–0, 3–0)	Switzerland	Adirondack Bank Center, Utica; Attendance: 1,388

Game reference

Klára Peslarová
Goalies
Saskia Maurer
Referees:
(Canada) Cianna Lieffers
(United States) Chelsea Rapin
Linesmen:
(United States) Melanie Gotsdiner
(Czech Republic) Kamila Smetková

Tejralová (Vanišová) – 00:37	1–0
	1–1	16:31 – Stalder (Müller, Enzler) (PP2)
Vanišová (Křížová, Pejzlová) – 34:03	2–1
Mlýnková (Šapovalivová) – 35:09	3–1
Pejšová (Čajanová, Mlýnková) (PP) – 49:46	4–1
Mlýnková (Hymlárová) – 55:05	5–1
Mlýnková (Přibylová, Pejšová) (SH) – 59:56	6–1

8 min
Penalties
6 min
36
Shots
19

=== Group B ===
Pos	Team	Pld	W	OTW	OTL	L	GF	GA	GD	Pts	Qualification or relegation
1	Germany	4	4	0	0	0	13	2	+11	12	Quarterfinals
2	Sweden	4	3	0	0	1	17	5	+12	9	Quarterfinals
3	Japan	4	1	0	1	2	8	13	−5	4	Quarterfinals
4	China	4	0	1	1	2	5	15	−10	3	Relegated to 2025 Division I
5	Denmark	4	0	1	0	3	4	12	−8	2	Relegated to 2025 Division I

Source: IIHF
Rules for classification: 1) points; 2) head-to-head points; 3) head-to-head goal difference; 4) head-to-head number of goals scored; 5) result against closest best-ranked team outside tied teams; 6) result against second-best ranked team outside tied teams; 7) seeding before tournament.

3 April 2024; 11:00	Denmark	1–3 (0–0, 0–2, 1–1)	Sweden	Adirondack Bank Center, Utica; Attendance: 3,721

Game reference

Emma-Sofie Nordstrøm
Goalies
Emma Söderberg
Referees:
(Austria) Julia Kainberger
(United States) Amanda Tassoni
Linesmen:
(Canada) Laura Gutasukas
(Canada) Kirsten Welsh

	0–1	32:19 – Wikner Zienkiewicz (Nylén Persson)
	0–2	38:54 – Ljungblom (Svensson, Lundin) (PP)
	0–3	44:11 – Bouveng (Forsgren, Hjalmarsson)
Jensen (Ranum) – 51:26	1–3

8 min
Penalties
2 min
5
Shots
39

4 April 2024; 11:00	China	3–2 GWS (0–1, 1–0, 1–1) (OT: 0–0) (SO: 1–0)	Japan	Adirondack Bank Center, Utica; Attendance: 2,308

Game reference

Zhan Jiahui
Goalies
Miyuu Masuhara
Referees:
(Germany) Vanessa Anselm
(United States) Melissa Doyle
Linesmen:
(France) Alexia Cheyroux
(Czech Republic) Kamila Smetková

	0–1	04:12 – Ak. Shiga (H. Yamashita)
Yang – 37:45	1–1
	1–2	43:37 – Ito (Aoi Shiga, Ak. Shiga)
Guan (Zhu, Zhang) (PP) – 47:37	2–2

Fang (miss)
Zhang (miss)
Kong (miss)
Guan
Shootout
(miss) Ito
(miss) Koyama
(miss) Toko
(miss) Ak. Shiga
(miss) Ukita
4 min
Penalties
6 min
17
Shots
52

4 April 2024; 15:00	Denmark	1–5 (0–1, 0–1, 1–3)	Germany	Adirondack Bank Center, Utica; Attendance: 1,385

Game reference

Emma-Sofie Nordstrøm
Goalies
Sandra Abstreiter
Referees:
(United States) Samantha Hiller
(Czech Republic) Zuzana Svobodová
Linesmen:
(United States) Sarah Buckner
(Poland) Natalia Suchanek

	0–1	19:46 – Li. Welcke (Lu. Welcke) (SH)
	0–2	39:10 – Kluge (Gleißner, Hark) (PP)
	0–3	44:49 – Hark (Nix, Kluge)
	0–4	52:43 – Schiefer (Haider)
Jensen (Friis-Hansen, Asperup) (PP) – 56:15	1–4
	1–5	57:14 – Nix (EN)

12 min
Penalties
8 min
12
Shots
44

5 April 2024; 11:00	Sweden	8–1 (4–0, 4–1, 0–0)	China	Adirondack Bank Center, Utica; Attendance: 2,041

Game reference

Ida Boman
Goalies
Zhan Jiahui
Wang Yuqing
Referees:
(United States) Melissa Doyle
(Canada) Amy Martin
Linesmen:
(Germany) Leonie Ernst
(Canada) Justine Todd

Svensson – 06:38	1–0
Svensson (Nylén Persson) (PP) – 08:57	2–0
Ljungblom (Andersson, Bergström) – 12:33	3–0
Wikner Zienkiewicz (Bergström, Hallin) – 17:46	4–0
Lundin (Karlsson) – 20:49	5–0
Bouveng Lundin) – 21:06	6–0
Olsson (Bergström, Svensson) – 22:45	7–0
	7–1	23:46 – Kong (Du)
Hjalmarsson (Ljungblom) – 26:25	8–1

4 min
Penalties
2 min
56
Shots
6

6 April 2024; 15:00	Japan	1–4 (0–0, 0–2, 1–2)	Germany	Adirondack Bank Center, Utica; Attendance: 1,831

Game reference

Riko Kawaguchi
Goalies
Sandra Abstreiter
Referees:
(Canada) Jennifer Berezowski
(Canada) Cianna Lieffers
Linesmen:
(United States) Melanie Gotsdiner
(Czech Republic) Kamila Smetková

	0–1	35:45 – Schiefer (Feldmeier, Strobel)
	0–2	38:23 – Karpf (Strobel, Li. Welcke) (PP)
	0–3	58:14 – Lu. Welcke (Voigt, Li. Welcke) (EN)
Ak. Shiga (Hitosato, Sato) (EA) – 58:37	1–3
	1–4	59:06 – Eisenschmid (EN)

6 min
Penalties
8 min
30
Shots
29

7 April 2024; 11:00	Sweden	6–2 (2–0, 1–2, 3–0)	Japan	Adirondack Bank Center, Utica; Attendance: 2,194

Game reference

Emma Söderberg
Goalies
Riko Kawaguchi
Referees:
(Germany) Vanessa Anselm
(Canada) Jennifer Berezowski
Linesmen:
(Canada) Laura Gutasukas
(Czech Republic) Kamila Smetková

Hedqvist (Karlsson, Hjalmarsson) (PP) – 06:45	1–0
Bouveng – 08:34	2–0
	2–1	27:23 – Toko (Koike)
	2–2	38:12 – Ito (Ak. Shiga, Aoi Shiga) (PP)
Svensson (Nylén Persson, Olsson) (PP) – 38:36	3–2
Johansson (Hallin) – 44:58	4–2
Hjalmarsson (Lundin, Bouveng) – 50:42	5–2
Bouveng (EN) – 56:41	6–2

8 min
Penalties
8 min
43
Shots
22

7 April 2024; 19:00	China	1–2 GWS (0–0, 0–1, 1–0) (OT:0–0) (SO: 0–1)	Denmark	Adirondack Bank Center, Utica; Attendance: 1,548

Game reference
Zhan Jiahui	Goalies	Emma-Sofie Nordstrøm	Referees: (United States) Chelsea Rapin (Czech Republic) Zuzana Svobodová; Linesmen: (Germany) Leonie Ernst (Czech Republic) Kristýna Hájková
/ 0–1 / 38:28 – Refsgaard (Kielstrup, Jensen); Kong (Fang, Yu) – 58:09 / 1–1			Referees: (United States) Chelsea Rapin (Czech Republic) Zuzana Svobodová; Linesmen: (Germany) Leonie Ernst (Czech Republic) Kristýna Hájková
Fang (miss); Zhang (miss); Kong (miss); Guan (miss)	Shootout	Foss; (miss) Melberg; Jensen	Referees: (United States) Chelsea Rapin (Czech Republic) Zuzana Svobodová; Linesmen: (Germany) Leonie Ernst (Czech Republic) Kristýna Hájková
2 min	Penalties	4 min	Referees: (United States) Chelsea Rapin (Czech Republic) Zuzana Svobodová; Linesmen: (Germany) Leonie Ernst (Czech Republic) Kristýna Hájková
24	Shots	35	Referees: (United States) Chelsea Rapin (Czech Republic) Zuzana Svobodová; Linesmen: (Germany) Leonie Ernst (Czech Republic) Kristýna Hájková

8 April 2024; 11:00	Germany	1–0 (0–0, 0–0, 1–0)	Sweden	Adirondack Bank Center, Utica; Attendance: 1,808

Game reference
Sandra Abstreiter	Goalies	Emma Söderberg	Referees: (Germany) Vanessa Anselm (Finland) Anniina Nurmi; Linesmen: (France) Alexia Cheyroux (Poland) Natalia Suchanek
Feldmeier (Botthof, Haider) – 48:06 / 1–0			Referees: (Germany) Vanessa Anselm (Finland) Anniina Nurmi; Linesmen: (France) Alexia Cheyroux (Poland) Natalia Suchanek
8 min	Penalties	8 min	Referees: (Germany) Vanessa Anselm (Finland) Anniina Nurmi; Linesmen: (France) Alexia Cheyroux (Poland) Natalia Suchanek
24	Shots	32	Referees: (Germany) Vanessa Anselm (Finland) Anniina Nurmi; Linesmen: (France) Alexia Cheyroux (Poland) Natalia Suchanek

9 April 2024; 11:00	Germany	3–0 (2–0, 0–0, 1–0)	China	Adirondack Bank Center, Utica; Attendance: 2,638

Game reference

Lisa Hemmerle
Goalies
Zhan Jiahui
Referees:
(United States) Melissa Doyle
(Czech Republic) Zuzana Svobodová
Linesmen:
(Poland) Natalia Suchanek
(Canada) Justine Todd

Kluge (Gleißner) – 00:28	1–0
Nix (Eisenschmid, Kluge) (PP) – 15:57	2–0
Karpf (EN) – 57:22	3–0

8 min
Penalties
4 min
44
Shots
9

9 April 2024; 19:00	Japan	3–0 (1–0, 1–0, 1–0)	Denmark	Adirondack Bank Center, Utica; Attendance: 1,619

Game reference

Riko Kawaguchi
Goalies
Emma-Sofie Nordstrøm
Referees:
(Germany) Vanessa Anselm
(United States) Samantha Hiller
Linesmen:
(Germany) Leonie Ernst
(Finland) Tiina Saarimäki

Koyama (Toko, Hitosato) (PP) – 04:47	1–0
Taka (Ak. Shiga) – 30:17	2–0
Ukita (EN) – 56:37	3–0

0 min
Penalties
6 min
31
Shots
8

== Knockout stage ==
There was a re-seeding after the quarterfinals.

=== Bracket ===
Quarterfinals
11 April
A1 United States	10
B3 Japan	0
11 April
A2 Canada	5
B2 Sweden	1
11 April
A3 Czechia	1
B1 Germany	0
11 April
A4 Finland	3
A5 Switzerland	1

Semifinals
13 April
1 United States	5
4 Finland	0
13 April
2 Canada	4
3 Czechia	0

Final
14 April
1 United States	5
2 Canada (OT)	6
Third place
14 April
3 Czechia	2
4 Finland (GWS)	3

=== Quarterfinals ===
11 April 2024; 10:00	Finland	3–1 (1–1, 1–0, 1–0)	Switzerland	Adirondack Bank Center, Utica; Attendance: 1,399

Game reference

Sanni Ahola
Goalies
Andrea Brändli
Referees:
(United States) Melissa Doyle
(United States) Amanda Tassoni
Linesmen:
(Canada) Laura Gutasukas
(Canada) Justine Todd

	0–1	01:22 – Wey (Müller, Christen)
Nieminen (Laitinen, Hiirikoski) – 10:59	1–1
Tapani (Nieminen, Savolainen) – 36:34	2–1
Laitinen (Karvinen, Tapani) – 42:42	3–1

14 min
Penalties
8 min
37
Shots
17

11 April 2024; 13:30	Czechia	1–0 (0–0, 0–0, 1–0)	Germany	Adirondack Bank Center, Utica; Attendance: 1,388

Game reference
Klára Peslarová	Goalies	Sandra Abstreiter	Referees: (Canada) Cianna Lieffers (Finland) Anniina Nurmi; Linesmen: (France) Alexia Cheyroux (Canada) Kirsten Welsh
Pejšová (Tejralová, Pejzlová) – 52:54 / 1–0			Referees: (Canada) Cianna Lieffers (Finland) Anniina Nurmi; Linesmen: (France) Alexia Cheyroux (Canada) Kirsten Welsh
27 min	Penalties	2 min	Referees: (Canada) Cianna Lieffers (Finland) Anniina Nurmi; Linesmen: (France) Alexia Cheyroux (Canada) Kirsten Welsh
24	Shots	17	Referees: (Canada) Cianna Lieffers (Finland) Anniina Nurmi; Linesmen: (France) Alexia Cheyroux (Canada) Kirsten Welsh

11 April 2024; 17:00	Canada	5–1 (2–1, 1–0, 2–0)	Sweden	Adirondack Bank Center, Utica; Attendance: 1,512

Game reference

Emerance Maschmeyer
Goalies
Emma Söderberg
Referees:
(Austria) Julia Kainberger
(Canada) Amy Martin
Linesmen:
(United States) Sarah Buckner
(Finland) Tiina Saarimäki

Fast (Serdachny, Larocque) – 02:25	1–0
Stacey (Turnbull) – 05:29	2–0
	2–1	11:26 – Svensson (Lundin, Olsson) (PP)
Fast (Larocque, O'Neill) – 28:11	3–1
Spooner (Maltais, Nurse) – 53:56	4–1
Bourbonnais (Poulin, Shelton) – 54:42	5–1

10 min
Penalties
8 min
44
Shots
18

11 April 2024; 20:30	United States	10–0 (3–0, 6–0, 1–0)	Japan	Adirondack Bank Center, Utica; Attendance: 3,504

Game reference

Aerin Frankel
Goalies
Riko Kawaguchi
Miyuu Masuhara
Referees:
(United States) Samantha Hiller
(Canada) Shauna Neary
Linesmen:
(Canada) Alex Clarke
(Czech Republic) Kristýna Hájková

Eden – 03:59	1–0
Knight (Carpenter, Harvey) – 08:35	2–0
Carpenter (Coyne Schofield, Knight) – 11:51	3–0
Simms (Heise, Scamurra) – 21:05	4–0
Murphy (Keller, Bilka) – 22:31	5–0
Dunne (Eden, Guilday) – 28:19	6–0
Murphy (Janecke, Harmon) – 32:54	7–0
Janecke (Murphy, Keller) – 36:10	8–0
Harvey (Carpenter, Knight) – 36:44	9–0
Carpenter (Knight, Coyne Schofield) – 45:25	10–0

2 min
Penalties
0 min
48
Shots
14

=== Semifinals ===
13 April 2024; 15:00	United States	5–0 (1–0, 1–0, 3–0)	Finland	Adirondack Bank Center, Utica; Attendance: 3,989

Game reference

Aerin Frankel
Goalies
Sanni Ahola
Referees:
(Finland) Anniina Nurmi
(United States) Amanda Tassoni
Linesmen:
(United States) Sarah Buckner
(Finland) Tiina Saarimäki

Bilka (Murphy, Janecke) – 12:01	1–0
Edwards (Janecke) (PP) – 33:14	2–0
Edwards (Heise, Simms) – 42:34	3–0
Edwards (Heise, Simms) – 46:24	4–0
Harmon (Curl, Dunne) – 56:10	5–0

4 min
Penalties
6 min
55
Shots
15

13 April 2024; 19:00	Canada	4–0 (2–0, 1–0, 1–0)	Czechia	Adirondack Bank Center, Utica; Attendance: 2,121

Game reference

Ann-Renée Desbiens
Goalies
Klára Peslarová
Referees:
(Finland) Anniina Nurmi
(United States) Amanda Tassoni
Linesmen:
(United States) Sarah Buckner
(Finland) Tiina Saarimäki

Turnbull (Stacey, Larocque) – 04:32	1–0
Larocque (Stacey, Clark) – 18:15	2–0
Clark (Spooner) – 21:39	3–0
Fillier (Fast) – 44:40	4–0

6 min
Penalties
8 min
47
Shots
9

=== Fifth place game ===
13 April 2024; 11:00	Switzerland	3–2 OT (1–0, 1–2, 0–0) (OT: 1–0)	Germany	Adirondack Bank Center, Utica; Attendance: 1,423

Game reference

Andrea Brändli
Saskia Maurer
Goalies
Sandra Abstreiter
Referees:
(United States) Samantha Hiller
(Canada) Shauna Neary
Linesmen:
(Canada) Laura Gutasukas
(Canada) Kirsten Welsh

Müller (Christen) – 17:58	1–0
	1–1	30:20 – Lu. Welcke (Li. Welcke, Feldmeier)
Stalder (Wey) – 32:27	2–1
	2–2	38:18 – Nix (Kluge, Eisenschmid)
Müller (Leemann) – 64:07	3–2

6 min
Penalties
4 min
23
Shots
23

=== Third place game ===
14 April 2024; 13:00	Czechia	2–3 GWS (0–0, 1–2, 1–0) (OT: 0–0) (SO: 0–1)	Finland	Adirondack Bank Center, Utica; Attendance: 2,014

Game reference

Klára Peslarová
Goalies
Sanni Ahola
Referees:
(United States) Samantha Hiller
(Canada) Shauna Neary
Linesmen:
(Canada) Laura Gutasukas
(Finland) Tiina Saarimäki

	0–1	20:20 – Karvinen (Tapani, Nieminen)
Pejzlová (Vanišová) (PP) – 25:50	1–1
	1–2	36:30 – Vainikka (Holopainen)
Křížová (Plosová, Radová) (PP) – 44:11	2–2

Mlýnková (miss)
Hymlárová
Šapovalivová (miss)
Čajanová (miss)
Křížová (miss)
Shootout
Karvinen
(miss) Vainikka
Nieminen
(miss) Vanhanen
6 min
Penalties
6 min
31
Shots
49

=== Final ===
14 April 2024; 17:00	United States	5–6 OT (1–1, 2–2, 2–2) (OT: 0–1)	Canada	Adirondack Bank Center, Utica; Attendance: 4,142

Game reference

Aerin Frankel
Goalies
Ann-Renée Desbiens
Referees:
(Canada) Cianna Lieffers
(United States) Amanda Tassoni
Linesmen:
(Canada) Alex Clarke
(Czech Republic) Kristýna Hájková

	0–1	06:32 – Ambrose
Edwards (Heise) – 08:12	1–1
	1–2	23:08 – J. Gosling (Bourbonnais)
Keller (Bilka, Murphy) – 30:10	2–2
Carpenter (Coyne Schofield, Curl) – 36:32	3–2
	3–3	38:58 – Poulin
Knight (Harvey, Edwards) (PP) – 48:56	4–3
	4–4	50:46 – Clark (Stacey)
	4–5	52:19 – Poulin (Fast)
Harvey (Eden, Scamurra) – 54:58	5–5
	5–6	65:16 – Serdachny (Ambrose, Desbiens) (PP)

4 min
Penalties
6 min
24
Shots
30

== Final standings ==
Pos	Grp	Team	Pld	W	OTW	OTL	L	GF	GA	GD	Pts	Final result
1	A	Canada	7	5	1	1	0	27	8	+19	18	Champions
2	A	United States (H)	7	5	1	1	0	36	9	+27	18	Runners-up
3	A	Finland	7	2	1	0	4	15	23	−8	8	Third place
4	A	Czechia	7	3	0	1	3	13	19	−6	10	Fourth place
5	A	Switzerland	6	0	1	0	5	7	23	−16	2	Fifth place game
6	B	Germany	6	4	0	1	1	15	6	+9	13	Fifth place game
7	B	Sweden	5	3	0	0	2	18	10	+8	9	
8	B	Japan	5	1	0	1	3	8	23	−15	4	
9	B	China	4	0	1	1	2	5	15	−10	3	Relegated to the 2025 Division I A
10	B	Denmark	4	0	1	0	3	4	12	−8	2	Relegated to the 2025 Division I A

Source: IIHF
(H) Host

== Awards and statistics ==
The awards were announced on 14 April 2024.

=== Awards ===
Directorate Awards

Position	Player
Goaltender	(Germany) Sandra Abstreiter
Defenceman	(Canada) Renata Fast
Forward	(United States) Alex Carpenter
MVP	(United States) Laila Edwards

All-Star team

Position	Player
Goaltender	(Finland) Sanni Ahola
Defenceman	(Canada) Renata Fast
Defenceman	(United States) Caroline Harvey
Forward	(United States) Alex Carpenter
Forward	(United States) Laila Edwards
Forward	(Czech Republic) Natálie Mlýnková

=== Scoring leaders ===
List shows the top skaters sorted by points, then goals.

Player	GP	G	A	PTS	+/−	PIM	Pos
(United States) Alex Carpenter	7	6	4	10	+10	2	F
(United States) Hilary Knight	7	4	6	10	+9	0	F
(United States) Caroline Harvey	7	2	8	10	+12	2	D
(United States) Kendall Coyne Schofield	7	3	6	9	+9	0	F
(United States) Laila Edwards	7	6	2	8	+5	0	F
(United States) Abbey Murphy	7	3	5	8	+6	4	F
(United States) Taylor Heise	7	2	5	7	+7	2	F
(Sweden) Hilda Svensson	5	4	2	6	+2	0	F
(Czech Republic) Natálie Mlýnková	7	4	2	6	+1	2	F
(Canada) Renata Fast	7	3	3	6	+15	6	D

GP = Games Played, G = Goals, A = Assists, PTS = Points, +/- = Plus/Minus, PIM = Penalties in Minutes, Pos = Position
Source: IIHF

=== Leading goaltenders ===
Only the top five goaltenders, based on save percentage, who have played at least 40% of their team's minutes, are included in this list.

Player	TOI	GA	GAA	SA	Sv%	SO
(Germany) Sandra Abstreiter	303:11	6	1.19	121	95.04	1
(China) Zhan Jiahui	209:45	9	2.57	149	93.92	0
(Canada) Ann-Renée Desbiens	308:54	7	1.36	85	93.58	2
(Denmark) Emma-Sofie Nordstrøm	241:19	10	2.49	136	92.65	0
(Czech Republic) Klára Peslarová	430:00	18	2.51	242	92.56	2

TOI = Time on Ice, GA = Goals Against, GAA = Goals Against Average, SA = Shots Against, Sv% = Save Percentage, SO = Shutouts
Source: IIHF
