= Akane Shiga =

Japanese ice hockey player (born 2001)

Akane Shiga 志賀紅音
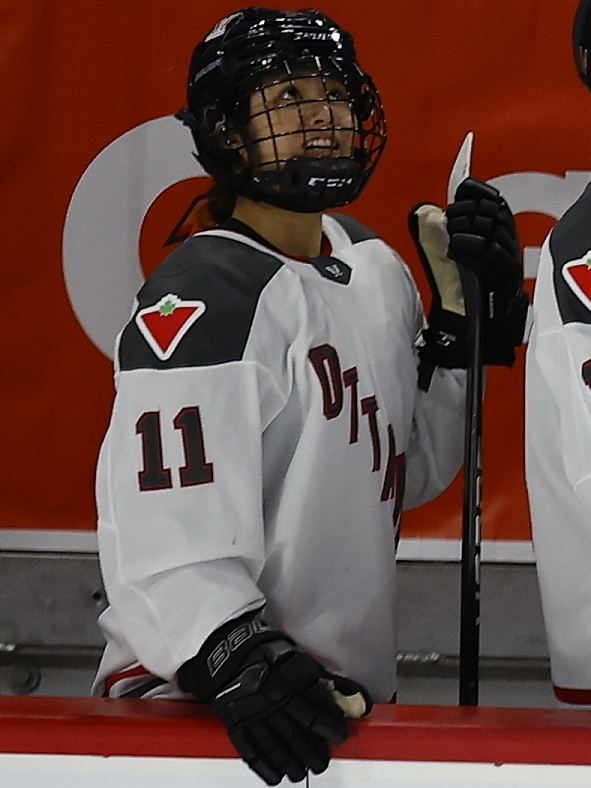
- Shiga with PWHL Ottawa in 2024
- Born: 3 March 2001 (age 25) Obihiro, Japan
- Height: 1.64 m (5 ft 5 in)
- Weight: 61 kg (134 lb; 9 st 8 lb)
- Position: Forward
- Shoots: Right
- PWHL team Former teams: Detroit Clutch: Luleå HF/MSSK; PWHL Ottawa; Toyota Cygnus; Obihiro Ladies
- National team: Japan
- Playing career: 2018–present
Medal record
World University Games
Silver medal – second place	2023 Lake Placid	Ice hockey

Akane Shiga (Japanese: 志賀 紅音, しが あかね, Hepburn: Shiga Akane; born 3 March 2001) is a Japanese ice hockey player for the Detroit Clutch of the Professional Women's Hockey League (PWHL) and member of the Japanese national team. She played for PWHL Ottawa in the inaugural season of the PWHL.

== Playing career ==
Shiga began participating elite-level ice hockey during the 2010s, playing in both the Women's Japan Ice Hockey League (WJIHL) and All-Japan Women's Ice Hockey Championship. She began her career with the Obihiro Ladies and later played with Toyota Cygnus.

On 22 December 2023, Shiga signed a one-year contract with PWHL Ottawa in the Professional Women's Hockey League (PWHL). Shiga was both the league's youngest player and the only player from Japan during the PWHL's inaugural season. In 24 games with Ottawa, Shiga recorded two goals.

In July 2024, Shiga signed a one-year contract with Luleå HF/MSSK of the Swedish Women's Hockey League (SDHL). Early in the season, in a 13–1 blowout victory over HV71 on September 20, 2024, that The Hockey News described as a "first-class drubbing," she recorded a goal and four assists for five points. She re-signed with the club ahead of the 2025–26 SDHL season.

On 27 July 2026, Shiga signed a two-year standard player agreement with the Detroit Clutch.

== International play ==
As a junior player with the Japanese national under-18 team, she participated in the IIHF U18 Women's World Championship Top Division tournaments in 2017 and 2019, and the Division I tournaments in 2016 and 2018.

Shiga made her national senior team debut at the 2019 IIHF Women's World Championship, at which she notched her first senior-level point – a goal assisted by Ayaka Toko and Hanae Kubo against Sweden in the preliminary round. She has subsequently represented Japan at the IIHF Women's World Championship tournaments in 2021, 2022, 2023, 2024, and 2025. She was Japan's leading scorer at the tournaments in 2021, 2022, and 2024, and was selected by the coaches as one of the top-three players for Japan in the same years.

Shiga represented Japan in the women's ice hockey tournament at the 2022 Winter Olympics in Beijing.

With the Japanese national under-25 team, she won a silver medal in the women's ice hockey tournament at the 2023 Winter World University Games in Lake Placid, New York. She was Japan's leading scorer, earning 6 points on 4 goals and 2 assists.

Shiga represented Japan in the women's ice hockey tournament at the 2026 Winter Olympics in Milan and Cortina. She tied Mei Miura as Japan's top scorer in the Games, with one goal and two assists across four games.

== Personal life ==
Her older sister, Aoi Shiga, is also an ice hockey player, a defenseman, with the Japanese national team.

== Career statistics ==
=== Regular season and playoffs ===
			Regular season					Playoffs
Season	Team	League	GP	G	A	Pts	PIM	GP	G	A	Pts	PIM
2018–19	Tokachi Obihiro Ladies	WJIHL	9	8	1	9	22	—	—	—	—	—
2023–24	Ottawa	PWHL	24	2	0	2	4	—	—	—	—	—
2024–25	Luleå HF	SDHL	34	9	22	31	16	9	2	5	7	2
PWHL totals			24	2	0	2	4	—	—	—	—	—
SDHL totals			34	9	22	31	16	9	2	5	7	2

=== International ===
Year	Team	Event	Result	GP	G	A	Pts	PIM
2016	Japan	U18 D1A	1st	5	2	2	4	0
2017	Japan	U18	8th	5	0	0	0	2
2018	Japan	U18 D1A	1st	5	0	5	5	0
2019	Japan	U18	8th	6	1	1	2	0
2019	Japan	WC	8th	5	1	0	1	4
2021	Japan	WC	6th	7	4	0	4	4
2022	Japan	OG	6th	5	2	1	3	2
2022	Japan	WC	5th	7	3	2	5	6
2023	Japan	WC	7th	6	0	1	1	8
2024	Japan	WC	8th	5	2	3	5	4
2025	Japan	WC	7th	4	2	0	2	0
2026	Japan	OG	9th	4	1	2	3	2
Junior totals				21	3	8	11	2
Senior totals				43	15	9	24	30
