= Riko Kawaguchi =

Japanese ice hockey player (born 2004)

Riko Kawaguchi 川口 莉子
- Born: 19 September 2004 (age 22) Kanagawa Prefecture, Japan
- Height: 1.66 m (5 ft 5 in)
- Weight: 71 kg (157 lb; 11 st 3 lb)
- Position: Goaltender
- Catches: Left
- WJIHL team: Daishin
- National team: Japan
- Playing career: 2021–present

Riko Kawaguchi (Japanese: 川口 莉子, かわぐち りこ, Hepburn: Kawaguchi Riko; born 19 September 2004) is a Japanese ice hockey goaltender who represents the national team and currently plays for Daishin IHC in the Women's Japan Ice Hockey League (WJIHL) as well as the All-Japan Women's Ice Hockey Championship.

== Playing career ==
In addition to playing for Daishin IHC, Kawaguchi is also a member of the ice hockey team at Bushūkan Junior and Senior High School, a well-known academic institution in Kushiro, Hokkaido, Japan.

=== International play ===
Medal record

Women's ice hockey

Representing Japan

Asian Winter Games
Gold medal – first place	2025 Harbin	Team

While playing for Japanese national under-18 team, Kawaguchi took part in the 2022 IIHF U18 Women's World Championship Division I Group A. She guarded the net for a bit more than one-third of the team's total ice time and earned a shutout victory over France. Together with fellow goaltender Ririna Takenaka, the duo led Japan to a whitewash tournament performance, with both goalies stopping every shot they faced and finishing with a perfect 0.00 goals against average.

Kawaguchi earned her debut with the Japanese senior national team at the 2022 IIHF Women's World Championship. Selected as the team's third goaltender behind veterans Miyuu Masuhara and Akane Konishi, she gained valuable experience by dressing for two games during the tournament. Her first taste of international senior-level action came in a preliminary round matchup against powerhouse Team Canada, where she was called into the game as a relief goaltender for Konishi. Despite the high-pressure situation, Kawaguchi held her ground admirably, playing for 32 minutes and 13 seconds and facing an intense offensive barrage with 36 shots on goal.

== Career statistics ==
=== International ===
Note: GP = Games played; Min, TOI = Minutes played; W = Wins; L = Losses; T,T/OT = Ties; OTL = Overtime losses; GA = Goals-against; GAA = Goals-against average; SO = Shutouts; SV% = Save percentage;

				Regular season
Year	Team	Event	Result	GP	W	L	T/OT	MIN	GA	SO	GAA	SV%
2022 U18	Japan U18	U18 WC	9th	3	2	0	0	88:50	0	1	0.00	1.000
2022	Japan	WC	5th	1	0	1	0	32:13	5	0	9.31	0.861
2023	Japan	WC	7th	5	0	5	0	213:32	11	0	3.09	0.905
2024	Japan	WC	8th	4	1	3	0	206:13	13	0	3.78	0.882
2025	Japan	AWG	1st place, gold medalist(s)	1	1	0	0	60:00	0	1	0.00	1.000
2026	Japan	OGQ	Q	1	1	0	0	60:00	1	0	1.00	0.800
2026	Japan	OG	9th	2	0	2	0	86:42	6	0	4.15	0.861
