= Kanami Seki =

Japanese ice hockey player (born 2000)

Kanami Seki 関 夏菜美
- Born: 23 June 2000 (age 26) Hokkaido, Japan
- Height: 1.66 m (5 ft 5 in)
- Weight: 65 kg (143 lb; 10 st 3 lb)
- Position: Defense
- Shoots: Left
- WJIHL team Former teams: Seibu Princess Rabbits: HV71; Daishin IHC; Sapporo Infinitys
- National team: Japan
- Playing career: 2014–present
Medal record
Asian Winter Games
Gold medal – first place	2025 Harbin	Team
World University Games
Silver medal – second place	2023 Lake Placid	Team

Kanami Seki (Japanese: 関夏菜美, Hepburn: Seki Kanami; born 23 June 2000) is a Japanese ice hockey player and member of the Japanese national team. She plays with the Seibu Princess Rabbits in the Women's Japan Ice Hockey League (WJIHL) and All-Japan Women's Ice Hockey Championship.

Seki previously played in the Swedish Women's Hockey League (SDHL) with HV71 during the 2023–24 season.

== International play ==
As a junior player with the Japanese national under-18 team, Seki participated in four IIHF U18 Women's World Championship tournaments – the Top Division tournaments in 2015 and 2017, the Division I (D1) tournament in 2016, and the Division I Group A (D1A) tournament in 2018.

Seki made her senior national team debut at the 2019 IIHF Women's World Championship and has gone on to skate in the IIHF Women's World Championships in 2022, 2023, 2024, and 2025.

Seki was part of the Japanese delegation of university students that participated in the 2023 Winter World University Games and contributed a goal and an assist to Japan's silver medal victory in the women's ice hockey tournament.

She won a gold medal with Japan in the women's ice hockey tournament at the 2025 Asian Winter Games.

In December 2025, Seki was selected to represent Japan in the women's ice hockey tournament at the 2026 Winter Olympics in Milan and Cortina. She tallied one point across four games, the primary assist on a goal scored by Yumeka Wajima against Germany.
