= Mei Miura =

Japanese ice hockey player (born 1998)

Mei Miura 三浦 芽依
- Born: 16 November 1998 (age 27) Hokkaido, Japan
- Height: 1.62 m (5 ft 4 in)
- Weight: 63 kg (139 lb; 9 st 13 lb)
- Position: Forward
- Shoots: Right
- WJIHL team Former teams: Toyota Cygnus; AIK Hockey
- National team: Japan
- Playing career: 2014–present
Medal record
Asian Winter Games
Gold medal – first place	2025 Harbin	Team
Universiade
Bronze medal – third place	2019 Krasnoyarsk	Team

Mei Miura (三浦 芽依, みうら めい, Miura Mei; born 16 November 1998) is a Japanese ice hockey player and member of the Japanese national team. She has played with Toyota Cygnus in the Women's Japan Ice Hockey League and All-Japan Women's Ice Hockey Championship since 2024.

== International play ==
As a junior player with the Japanese national under-18 team, she participated in the 2015 IIHF U18 Women's World Championship and the 2016 IIHF U18 Women's World Championship Division 1A.

With the Japanese national under-25 team, she won a bronze medal in the women's ice hockey tournament at the 2019 Winter Universiade in Krasnoyarsk. She was Japan's third-highest scorer, earning 6 points on two goals and four assists.

Miura made her national senior team debut at the 2019 IIHF Women's World Championship, at which she notched her first senior-level point – a goal assisted by Rui Ukita against France in the preliminary round. She has subsequently participated in the IIHF Women's World Championship tournaments in 2021 and 2023.

Miura represented Japan in the women's ice hockey tournament at the 2022 Winter Olympics in Beijing.
