= Ayaka Toko =

Japanese ice hockey player (born 1994)

Ayaka Toko 床 亜矢可
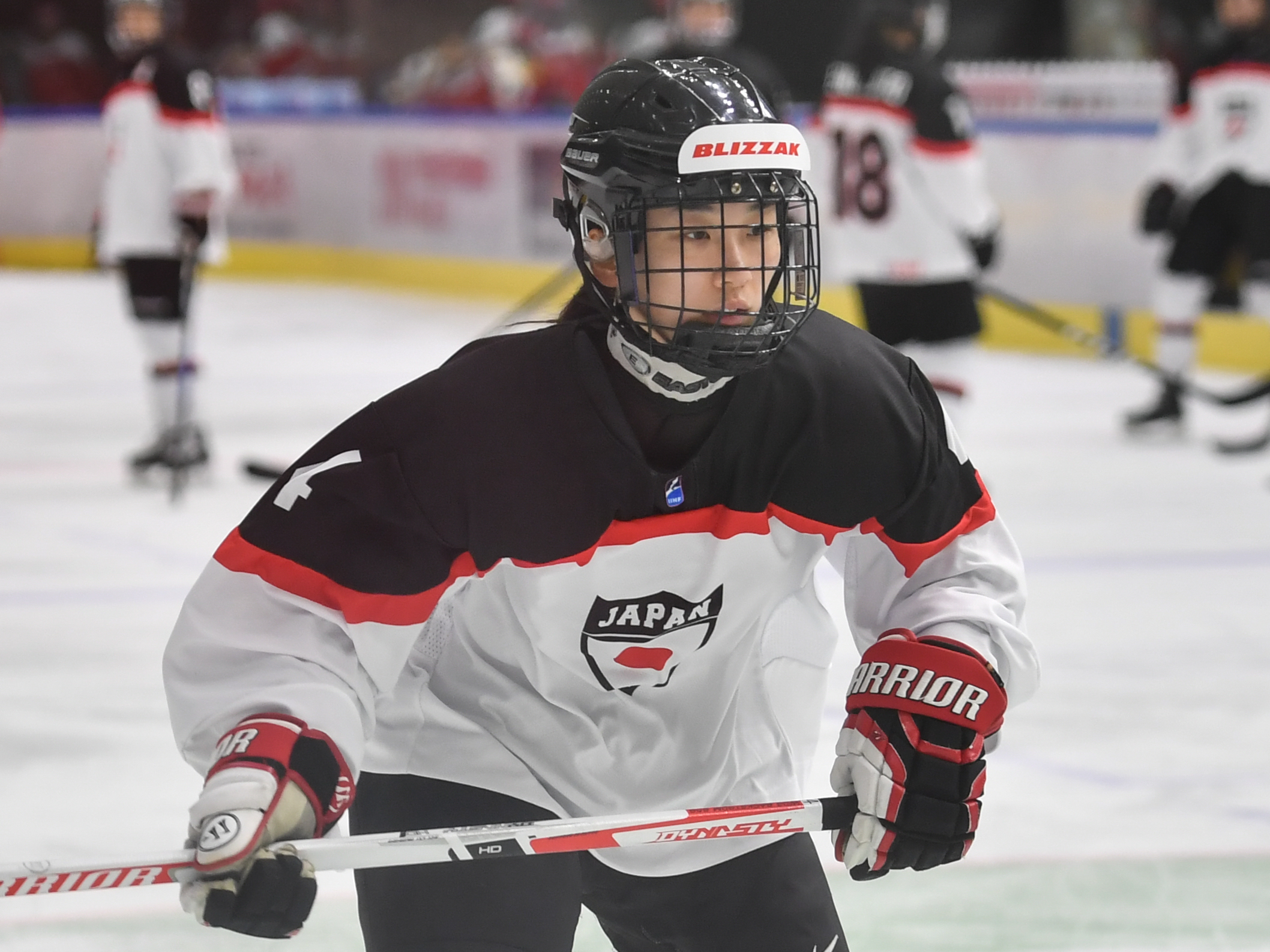
- Toko in 2017
- Born: 22 August 1994 (age 32) Higashimurayama, Tokyo, Japan
- Height: 1.61 m (5 ft 3 in)
- Weight: 60 kg (132 lb; 9 st 6 lb)
- Position: Defense
- Shoots: Right
- SDHL team Former teams: Linköping HC; Seibu Princess Rabbits; Daishin IHC
- National team: Japan
- Playing career: 2011–present
Medal record
Asian Winter Games
| Gold medal – first place | 2017 Sapporo | Ice hockey |
Universiade
| Bronze medal – third place | 2015 Granada | Ice hockey |

Ayaka Hitosato née Toko (Japanese: 人里亜矢可 née 床, Hepburn: Hitozato Ayaka née Toko; born 22 August 1994) is a Japanese ice hockey player and member of the Japanese national team, currently playing in the Swedish Women's Hockey League (SDHL) with Linköping HC. She previously served as captain to the Seibu Princess Rabbits of the Women's Japan Ice Hockey League (WJIHL) and All-Japan Women's Ice Hockey Championship.

== International play ==
Toko's first foray into international competition was as a member of the Japanese national under-18 ice hockey team at the 2010 IIHF Women's World U18 Championship, where she notched three assists in five games. At the 2011 IIHF Women's World U18 Championship, she served as an alternate captain and scored her first world championship goal.

Toko made her debut with the senior Japanese national ice hockey team in February 2013 at the final qualification for the women's ice hockey tournament at the 2014 Winter Olympics. Later that same year, she participated in the 2013 IIHF Women's World Championship Division I.

She participated at the 2015 IIHF Women's World Championship. She competed at both the 2014 and the 2018 Winter Olympics.

== Personal life ==
Her father, Yasunori, represented Japan at the 1991 Men's Ice Hockey World Championship – Group B in Yugoslavia. Her younger siblings are also ice hockey players. Her younger sister, Haruka (born 1997), is a two-time Olympian with the Japanese national ice hockey team and, as of the 2022–23 season, also plays with Linköping HC in the SDHL. Her younger brother, Yutaka (born 2003), has represented Japan with the Japan men's national junior ice hockey team and in the men's ice hockey tournament at the 2023 Winter World University Games.

After graduating from Hosei University in 2016, Toko joined All Nippon Airways through the Top Athlete Employment Support Navigation (AthNavi) program of the Japanese Olympic Committee.

Toko married ice hockey forward Shigeki Hitosato (人里 茂樹) in June 2022. The 2022 IIHF Women's World Championship was her first major tournament played using her married name.
