= Shiori Koike =

Japanese ice hockey player (born 1993)

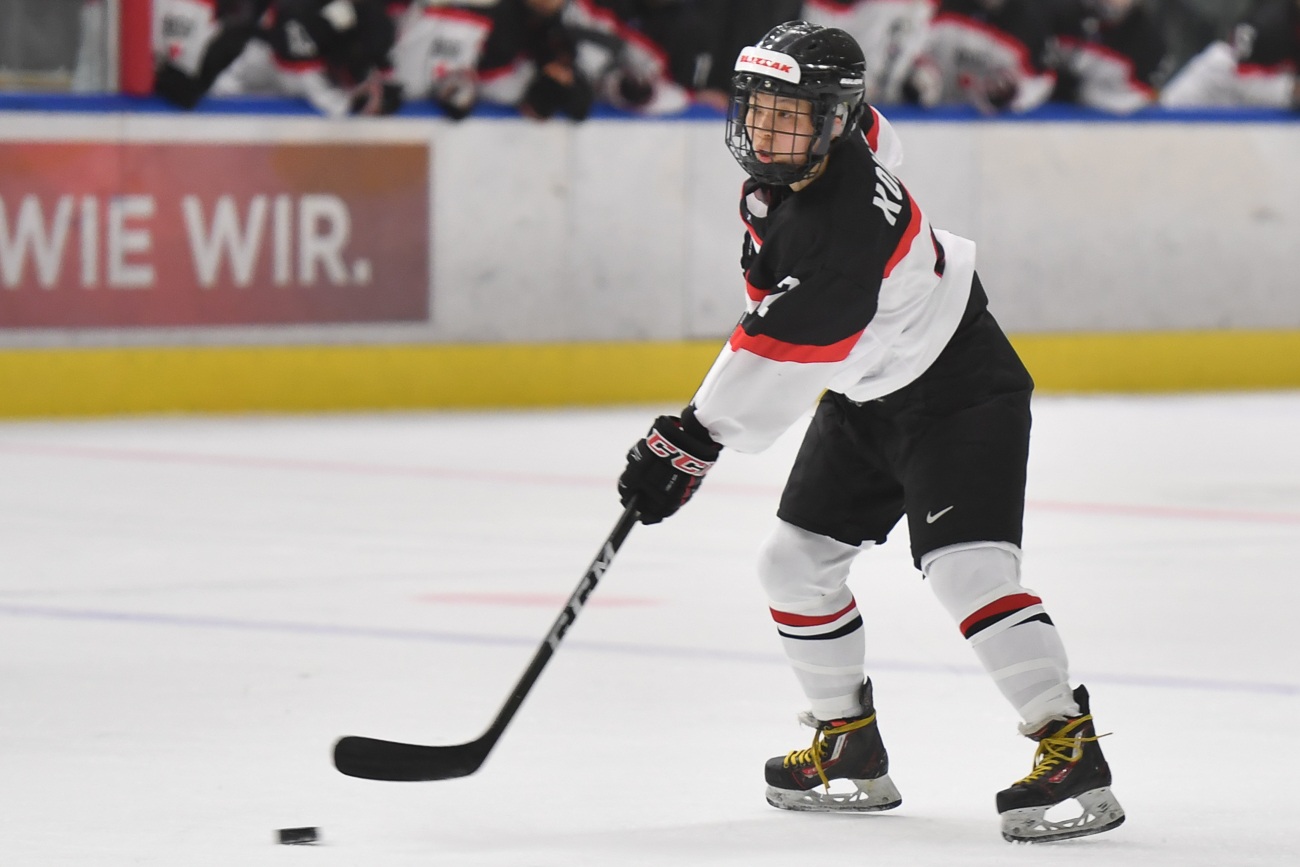
- Koike in 2017
- Born: 21 March 1993 (age 33) Tochigi, Japan
- Height: 1.59 m (5 ft 3 in)
- Weight: 52 kg (115 lb; 8 st 3 lb)
- Position: Defence
- Shoots: Left
- JWIHC team: DK Peregrine
- National team: Japan
- Playing career: 2011–present

Shiori Koike (小池 詩織, Koike Shiori; born 21 March 1993) is a Japanese ice hockey player for DK Peregrine and the Japanese national team. The Japanese team participated at the 2015 IIHF Women's World Championship coming third in their preliminary group. They also participated at the 2015 27th Winter Universiade, winning a bronze medal.

Koike competed at the 2014, 2018, and 2026 Winter Olympics. She was on the gold medal winning team at the 2025 Asian Winter Games.

== Career statistics ==
=== Regular season ===
Note: GP = Games played; G = Goals; A = Assists; Pts = Points; PIM = Penalty minutes;

			Regular season					Playoffs
Season	Team	League	GP	G	A	Pts	PIM	GP	G	A	Pts	PIM
2018-2019	DK Peregrine	Women's Japan Ice Hockey League	9	1	2	3	0	—	—	—	—	—

=== International ===
Medal record

Women's ice hockey

Representing Japan

Asian Winter Games
Gold medal – first place	2025 Harbin	Team
Gold medal – first place	2017 Sapporo	Team
Silver medal – second place	2011 Astana-Almaty	Team

Universiade
Bronze medal – third place	2015 Granada	Team

Note: GP = Games played; G = Goals; A = Assists; Pts = Points; PIM = Penalty minutes;

				Regular season
Year	Team	Event	Result	GP	G	A	Pts	PIM
2009	Japan U18	WC U18	9th	4	0	0	0	2
2010	Japan U18	WC U18	6th	5	1	1	2	2
2011	Japan U18	WC U18	8th	6	0	0	0	4
2011	Japan	AWG	2nd place, silver medalist(s)	4	0	2	2	0
2012	Japan	WC	11th	5	0	0	0	0
2013	Japan	WC	9th	5	1	0	1	4
2014	Japan	OGQ	11th (Q)	3	1	1	2	0
2014	Japan	OG	7th	5	0	0	0	0
2014	Japan	WC	1st	3	1	0	1	0
2015	Japan	WC	7th	5	0	1	1	2
2016	Japan	WC	8th	5	0	0	0	0
2017	Japan	WC	9th	5	0	1	1	6
2017	Japan	AWG	1st place, gold medalist(s)	0	–	–	—	–
2018	Japan	OGQ	7th (Q)	3	1	1	2	4
2018	Japan	OG	6th	5	2	1	3	0
2019	Japan	WC	8th	5	0	1	1	0
2021	Japan	WC	6th	6	0	2	2	2
2022	Japan	OG	6th	5	1	3	4	0
2022	Japan	WC	5th	5	0	0	0	4
2023	Japan	WC	7th	6	0	0	0	0
2024	Japan	WC	8th	5	0	1	1	2
2025	Japan	AWG	1st place, gold medalist(s)	3	0	5	5	0
2026	Japan	OGQ	7th (Q)	3	0	1	1	0
2026	Japan	OG	9th	4	0	0	0	0
