= Makoto Ito (ice hockey) =

Japanese ice hockey player (born 2004)

Makoto Ito 伊藤 麻琴
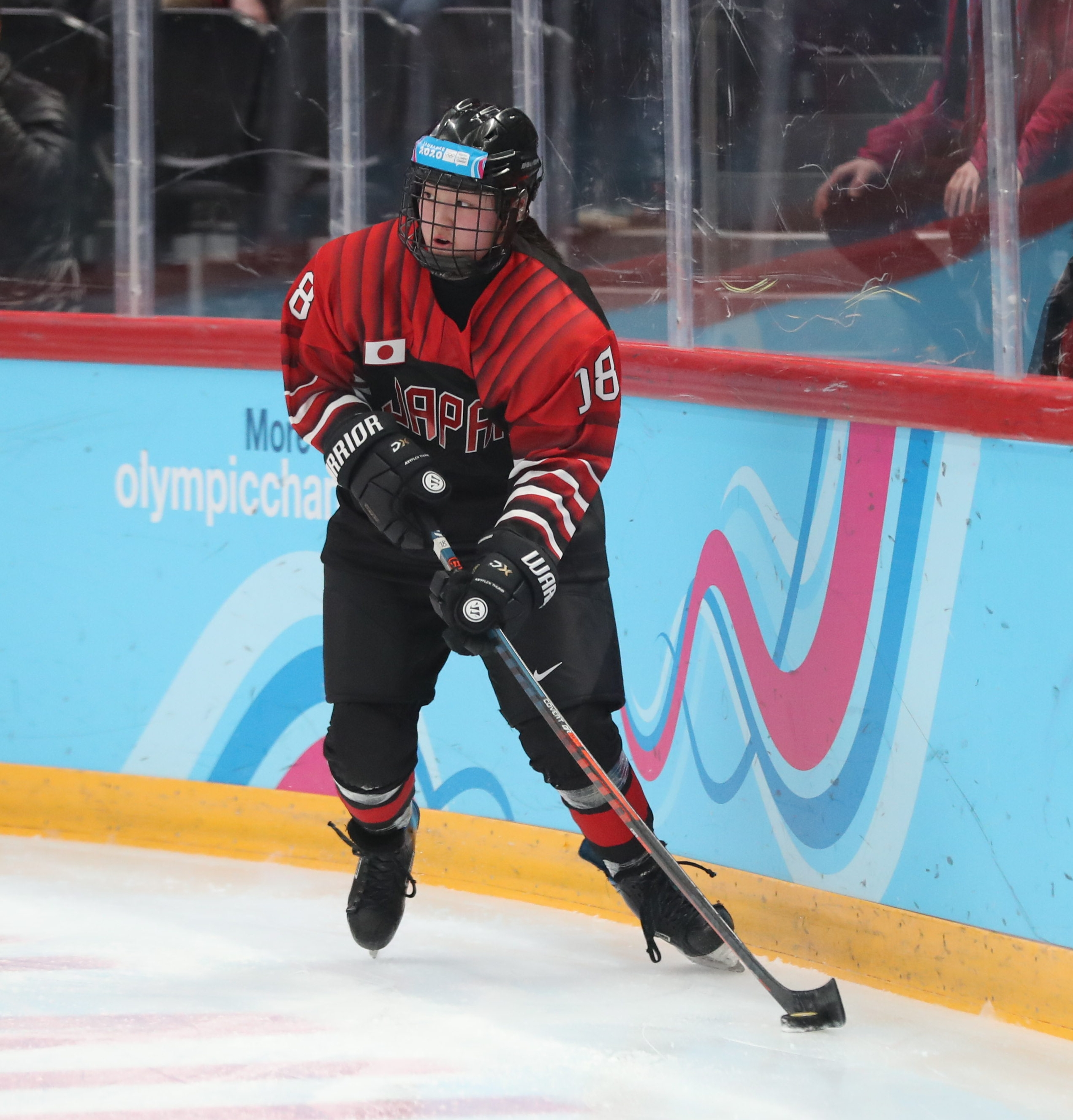
- Ito representing Japan at the 2020 Winter Youth Olympics
- Born: 2 May 2004 (age 22) Hokkaido, Japan
- Height: 169 cm (5 ft 7 in)
- Weight: 67 kg (148 lb; 10 st 8 lb)
- Position: Forward
- Shoots: Left
- WJIHL team Former teams: Toyota Cygnus; Daishin IHC
- National team: Japan
- Playing career: c. 2018–present
Medal record
Asian Winter Games
Gold medal – first place	2025 Harbin	Team
Asia Championship
Gold medal – first place	2025 Beijing

Makoto Ito (伊藤麻琴, Itō Makoto; born 2 May 2004) is a Japanese ice hockey player and member of the Japanese national team. She has played with Toyota Cygnus in the Women's Japan Ice Hockey League (WJIHL) and All-Japan Women's Ice Hockey Championship since the 2023–24 season.

== Playing career ==
As a junior ice hockey player with the Japanese under-18 team, Ito participated in three IIHF U18 Women's World Championships – the Top Division tournament in 2019 and the Division I Group A tournaments in 2020 and 2022. She made her U18 Worlds debut at age fourteen in the 2019 Top Division tournament and, despite being one of Japan's youngest players, led the team in scoring with three points across six games.

Ito represented Japan in the girls' ice hockey tournament at the 2020 Winter Youth Olympics in Lausanne. Her twelve points and seven assists led all skaters in the tournament and helped Japan claim gold.

Ito made her senior national team debut at age seventeen in the 2021 IIHF Women's World Championship, where she was Japan's youngest player. She has gone on to represent Japan at the IIHF Women's World Championship tournaments in 2022, 2023, and 2024.

Her achievements also include a gold medal at the 2025 IIHF Women's Asia Championship and a gold medal in the women's ice hockey tournament at the 2025 Asian Winter Games. In the qualification tournament for the 2026 Winter Olympics, Ito was a top-three scorer for Japan as the team secured a berth in the Olympic tournament.

== Personal life ==
Ito began studies in the Department of Child Development at Hokkaido Bunkyo University in 2023.
