= Aoi Shiga =

Japanese ice hockey player (born 1999)

Aoi Shiga 志賀葵
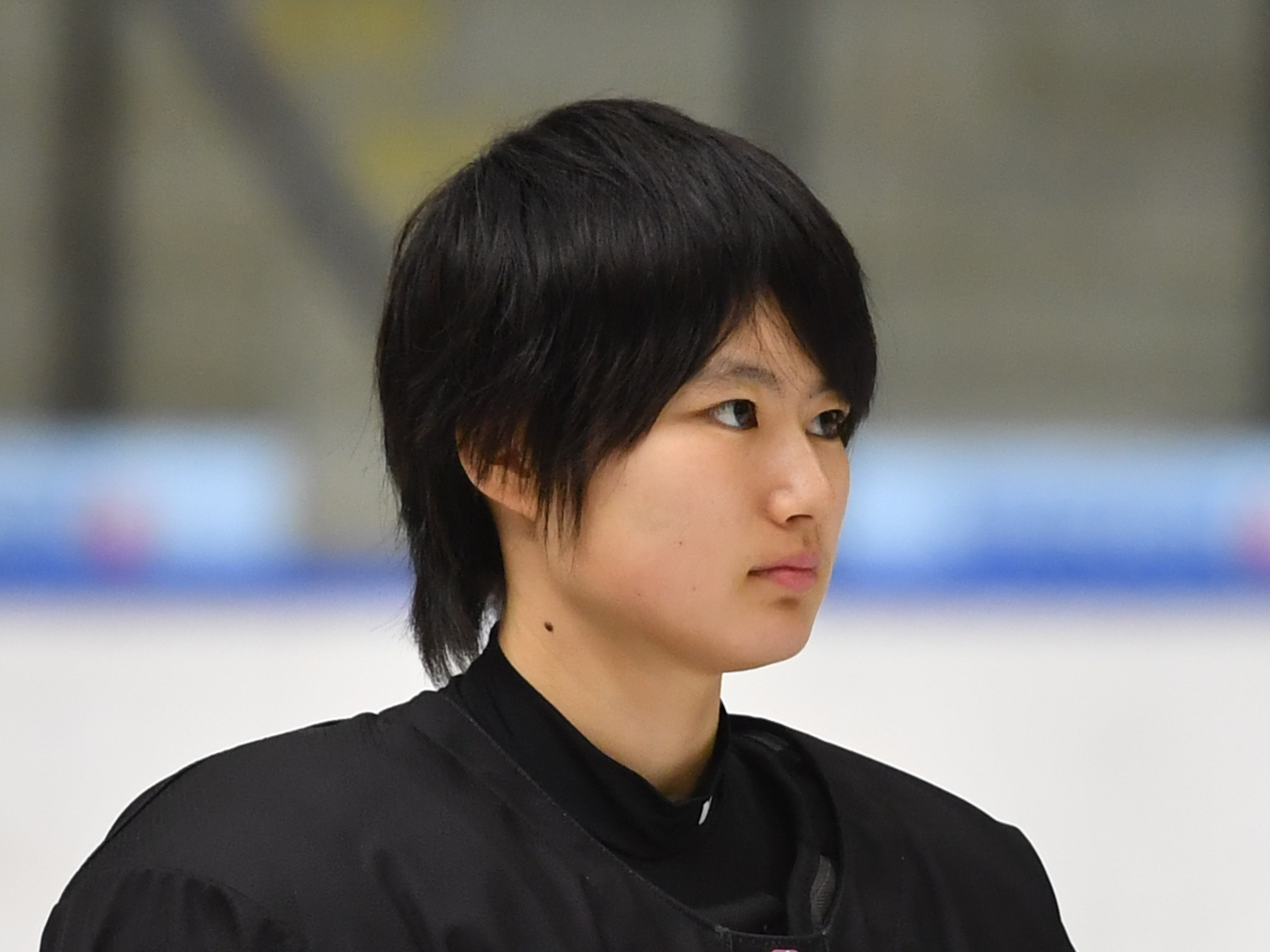
- Shiga representing Japan at the 2017 IIHF World Championship D1A
- Born: 4 July 1999 (age 27) Hokkaido, Japan
- Height: 1.66 m (5 ft 5 in)
- Weight: 58 kg (128 lb; 9 st 2 lb)
- Position: Defense
- Shoots: Left
- SDHL team Former teams: Modo Hockey Dam; Toyota Cygnus; Obihiro Ladies; Ladies Team Lugano
- National team: Japan
- Playing career: 2015–present

Aoi Shiga (Japanese: 志賀 葵, しが あおい, Hepburn: Shiga Aoi; born 4 July 1999) is a Japanese ice hockey player and member of the Japanese national team, currently playing in the Swedish Women's Hockey League with Modo.¹

== International play ==
Medal record

Women's ice hockey

Representing Japan

World Championship
Gold medal – first place	2017 Austria	Division I Group A

World U18 Championship
Gold medal – first place	2016 Hungary	Division I

Asian Winter Games
Gold medal – first place	2025 Harbin	Team

As a junior player with the Japanese national under-18 team, she participated in the IIHF U18 Women's World Championship Top Division tournaments in 2015 and 2017, and the Division I tournament in 2016. In 2017, she served as national team captain and was selected by the coaches as a top-three player on the team.

Shiga made her national senior team debut at the 2016 IIHF Women's World Championship, where she was the youngest player representing Japan and the second-youngest player competing in the tournament (the youngest was Noemi Neubauerová of Czechia). The following year, she competed in the 2017 IIHF Women's World Championship Division I Group A tournament, once again as the youngest player on the team. She was a member of the Japanese delegation at the 2018 Winter Olympics in Peyongchang and played in the women's ice hockey tournament, in which Japan claimed sixth place.

Shiga has participated in the Top Division tournament of every IIHF Women's World Championship since playing in the 2019 tournament. She recorded her first point with the senior national team at the 2021 IIHF Women's World Championship, earning the secondary assist on a goal scored by her sister, Akane Shiga, against Hungary in the preliminary round. Her first senior national team goal was scored against Finland in the preliminary round of the 2022 IIHF Women's World Championship, assisted by Haruka Toko and Akane Shiga. The coaches named her as a top-three player for Japan in both 2021 and 2022.

She represented Japan in the women's ice hockey tournament at the 2022 Winter Olympics in Beijing, recording three assists in five games.

== Personal life ==
Her younger sister, Akane, is also an ice hockey player, a forward, with the Japanese national ice hockey team and PWHL Ottawa.

== Career statistics ==
=== Regular season and playoffs ===
			Regular season					Playoffs
Season	Team	League	GP	G	A	Pts	PIM	GP	G	A	Pts	PIM
2018–19	Toyota Cygnus	WJIHL	9	2	0	2	12	—	—	—	—	—
2023–24	Ladies Team Lugano	SWHL A	12	4	2	6	4	—	—	—	—	—
SWHL A totals			12	4	2	6	4	—	—	—	—	—

=== International ===
Year	Team	Event	Result	GP	G	A	Pts	PIM
2015	Japan	U18	8th	5	1	1	2	4
2016	Japan	U18 (Div I)	1st place, gold medalist(s)	5	3	1	4	2
2016	Japan	WC	8th	5	0	0	0	0
2017	Japan	U18	8th	5	0	0	0	0
2017	Japan	WC (Div IA)	1st place, gold medalist(s)	5	0	0	0	0
2018	Japan	OG	6th	5	0	0	0	0
2019	Japan	WC	8th	5	0	0	0	0
2021	Japan	WC	6th	7	0	2	2	0
2022	Japan	OG	6th	5	0	3	3	0
2022	Japan	WC	5th	7	1	1	2	0
2023	Japan	WC	7th	6	1	0	1	2
2024	Japan	WC	8th	5	0	2	2	2
2025	Japan	WC	7th	5	0	0	0	4
2026	Japan	OG	9th	4	0	2	2	2
Junior totals				15	4	2	6	6
Senior totals				59	2	10	12	10
