= Remi Koyama =

Japanese ice hockey player (born 2000)

Remi Koyama 小山 玲弥
- Born: 17 July 2000 (age 26) Yamanashi Prefecture, Japan
- Height: 1.47 m (4 ft 10 in)
- Weight: 54 kg (119 lb; 8 st 7 lb)
- Position: Forward
- Shoots: Right
- WJIHL team: Seibu Princess Rabbits
- National team: Japan
- Playing career: 2018–present
Medal record
Asian Winter Games
Gold medal – first place	2025 Harbin	Team
World University Games
Silver medal – second place	2023 Lake Placid	Team

Remi Koyama (Japanese: 小山玲弥, Hepburn: Koyama Remi; born 17 July 2000) is a Japanese ice hockey player and member of the Japanese national team, currently playing with the Seibu Princess Rabbits in the Women's Japan Ice Hockey League (WJIHL) and the All-Japan Women's Ice Hockey Championship.

== Playing career ==
As a junior player with the Japanese national under-18 team, Koyama participated in three IIHF U18 Women's World Championship tournaments, playing in the Division I tournament in 2016, the Top Division tournament in 2017, and the Division I Group A tournament in 2018.

A member of the senior national team since 2018, she represented Japan at the IIHF Women's World Championship in 2018, 2019 and 2022. She also participated in the women's ice hockey tournament at the 2022 Winter Olympics in Beijing, recording an assist in five games played.

Koyama won a silver medal with Team Japan in the women's ice hockey tournament at the 2023 Winter World University Games in Lake Placid, New York, ranking second in team scoring with 3 goals and 3 assists for 6 points in seven games.

== Personal life ==
As of January 2023, Koyama is a student at Waseda University in Shinjuku, Tokyo, Japan.
