= Ice hockey at the 2025 Asian Winter Games – Women's tournament =

Women at the 2025 Asian Winter Games
- Venue: Harbin Sport University Stadium
- Date: 3–14 February 2025
- Competitors: 154 from 7 nations

Medalists
gold medal	Japan
silver medal	Kazakhstan
bronze medal	China

The women's ice hockey tournament at the 2025 Asian Winter Games was held in Harbin, China, during 3 to 14 February at the Student Skating Hall of Harbin Sport University.

The women's national teams of China, Chinese Taipei, Hong Kong, Japan, Kazakhstan, South Korea, and Thailand participated in the tournament. The top two ranked teams Japan and China were given byes to the final round.

== Squads ==
China	Chinese Taipei	Hong Kong	Japan
Yu Baiwei; Zhang Mengying; Kong Minghui; Wu Sijia; Zhao Qinan; Hu Jiayi; Qu Yue; Du Sijia; Liu Siyang; Fang Xin; Wang Jiaxin; Liu Chunshuang; Guan Yingying; Yang Jinglei; Wang Yuqing; Zhang Biyang; Li Yiming; Lai Guimin; Gao Ziye; Li Qianhua; Zhao Ziyu; Wen Lu; Zhu Rui	Huang Min-chuan; Lin Yang-chi; Sha Yun-yun; Yeh Pei-han; Liu Chih-lin; Kao Wei-ting; Tao Sing-lin; Huang Yun-chu; Liu Yen-wei; Hsieh Chih-chen; Yeh Hui-chen; Chang En-wei; Chang En-ni; Lin Chieh-yun; Hsu Yu-tong; Hsu Ting-yu; Wang Yun-tzu; Hsu Tzu-ting; Wu Ji-cih; Tan Su-ting	Olivia Lloren; Tam Wing Hei; Li Ching Laam; So Hoi Kiu; Agnes Chim; Lau Yeuk Ting; Renee Ng; Ophelia Kwok; Estelle Ip; Cheung Wing Yan; Adrienne Li; Aman Leung; Myra Tsui; Cheung Tsz Ching; Katrina Cheng; Janice Ho; Wong Ka Wing; Chloe Fong; Andrea Lam; Charleen Wong; Apple Wang; Mok Hei Lam	Riko Kawaguchi; Shiori Koike; Aoi Shiga; Shiori Yamashita; Kohane Sato; Kanami Seki; Akane Hosoyamada; Hikaru Yamashita; Rui Ukita; Yoshino Enomoto; Wakana Kurosu; Suzuka Maeda; Makoto Ito; Haruka Kuromaru; Remi Koyama; Rio Noro; Mei Miura; Riri Noro; Yumeka Wajima; Ai Tada; Miyuu Masuhara
Kazakhstan	South Korea	Thailand	
Zlatotsveta Feoktistova; Alexandra Voronova; Munira Sayakhatkyzy; Katrin Meskini; Malika Aldabergenova; Pernesh Ashimova; Nadezhda Filimonova; Dariya Moldabay; Alexandra Shegay; Polina Yakovleva; Dilnaz Sayakhatkyzy; Madina Tursynova; Larissa Sviridova; Anna Pyatkova; Aida Olzhabayeva; Anastassiya Orazbayeva; Alina Ivanchenko; Arina Chshyokolova; Yuliya Butorina; Sofiya Zubkova; Tatyana Koroleva; Yekaterina Kutsenko; Polina Govtva	Park Jong-ju; Song Hee-oh; Eom Su-yeon; Park Min-ae; Lee So-jung; Kang Na-ra; Park Ye-eun; Kim Se-lin; Park Jong-ah; Choi Ji-yeon; Kim Do-won; Jung Ye-won; Lee Eun-ji; Park Ju-yeon; Lee Eun-ji; Han Soo-jin; Han Yu-an; Park Ji-yoon; Bae Jeong-yeon; Jung Si-yun; Kim Min-seo; Kang Si-hyun; Kim Yeon-ju	Thamida Kunthadapakorn; Wilaksaya Watthanakulcharoenchai; Nisthanant Loykulnant; Varachanant Boonyubol; Avita Pothong; Supitsara Thamma; Phraephailin Khanpakdee; Pacharamon Vorawat; Woranittha Sirivikul; Prim Dejthai; Pattranid Sornprom; Apichaya Kosanunt; Marisa Chimpradid; Pawarisa Sakchaicharoenkul; Wirasinee Rattananai; Rinrada Poka; Phraephloi Khanpakdee; Suwipa Panyamaneerat; Thipwarintorn Yannakornthanapunt; Kanpitcha Saentes; Sirikarn Jittresin; Jaravee Srichamnong	

== Results ==
All times are China Standard Time (UTC+08:00)

=== Preliminary round ===
Pos	Team	Pld	W	OW	OL	L	GF	GA	GD	Pts	Qualification
1	Kazakhstan	4	3	1	0	0	27	1	+26	11	Final round
2	South Korea	4	3	0	1	0	22	3	+19	10	Final round
3	Chinese Taipei	4	2	0	0	2	13	10	+3	6	
4	Thailand	4	1	0	0	3	3	25	−22	3	
5	Hong Kong	4	0	0	0	4	2	28	−26	0	

Source: OCA

3 February; 15:30	Thailand	1–4 (0–2, 1–1, 0–1)	Chinese Taipei	Harbin Sport University Stadium, Harbin; Attendance: 1,133

Game reference

Thamida Kunthadapakorn
Goalies
Hsu Tzu-ting
Referees:
Lee Kyung-sun (KOR)
Wan Mei Wah (MAS)

	0–1	17:16 – Chang E.N. (Hsu Y., Tan) (PP)
	0–2	18:13 – Huang Y. (Hsu Y., Chang E.N.) (PP)
	0–3	34:32 – Wu (Yeh H., Liu C.)
Yannakornthanapunt (Vorawat, Panyamaneerat) – 39:02	1–3
	1–4	59:01 – Huang M. (SH)

8 min
Penalties
8 min
15
Shots
42

3 February; 19:30	Hong Kong	0–12 (0–4, 0–5, 0–3)	Kazakhstan	Harbin Sport University Stadium, Harbin; Attendance: 1,133

Game reference

Mok Hei Lam
Goalies
Arina Chshyokolova
Referees:
Liu Lu (CHN)
Miyuki Nakayama (JPN)

0–1	08:31 – M. Sayakhatkyzy (D. Sayakhatkyzy, Voronova)
0–2	11:21 – D. Sayakhatkyzy (Voronova, Zubkova)
0–3	13:27 – Sviridova (Pyatkova, Aldabergenova)
0–4	18:39 – D. Sayakhatkyzy (Ashimova, Sviridova)
0–5	20:35 – Tursynova (Shegay)
0–6	24:43 – Orazbayeva (Moldabay, Filimonova)
0–7	26:22 – D. Sayakhatkyzy (Butorina, Zubkova)
0–8	38:19 – Zubkova (Olzhabayeva, Ashimova)
0–9	38:28 – M. Sayakhatkyzy (Butorina, Voronova)
0–10	50:15 – Moldabay (Tursynova, Filimonova)
0–11	56:24 – M. Sayakhatkyzy (Sviridova)
0–12	58:15 – Kutsenko (Koroleva)

4 min
Penalties
2 min
10
Shots
63

4 February; 15:30	South Korea	8–0 (2–0, 3–0, 3–0)	Hong Kong	Harbin Sport University Stadium, Harbin; Attendance: 1,121

Game reference

Kim Yeon-ju
Bae Jeong-yeon
Goalies
Mok Hei Lam
Referees:
Song Meina (CHN)
Wan Mei Wah (MAS)

Park Ji-Y. (Lee S., Eom) (PP) – 07:04	1–0
Kim S. (Park J.A., Lee E. Jr.) – 12:24	2–0
Choi (Jung S., Kim M.) – 22:08	3–0
Lee E. Jr. (Kim D.) – 28:08	4–0
Park J.A. (SH) – 36:28	5–0
Lee E. Sr. (Lee E. Jr., Kim S.) – 40:28	6–0
Eom (Choi, Park Ji-Y.) – 48:48	7–0
Kim S. (Lee E. Jr.) (PP) – 56:33	8–0

2 min
Penalties
16 min
76
Shots
5

4 February; 19:30	Kazakhstan	9–0 (2–0, 3–0, 4–0)	Thailand	Harbin Sport University Stadium, Harbin; Attendance: 1,019

Game reference

Arina Chshyokolova
Goalies
Thamida Kunthadapakorn
Referees:
Lee Kyung-sun (KOR)
Miyuki Nakayama (JPN)

Zubkova (Olzhabayeva) – 13:03	1–0
Orazbayeva (Moldabay, Tursynova) (PP) – 17:33	2–0
Filimonova (Shegay, Tursynova) – 29:36	3–0
Zubkova (Olzhabayeva, Aldabergenova) – 30:35	4–0
Zubkova (Voronova, Aldabergenova) – 31:08	5–0
M. Sayakhatkyzy (Zubkova, D. Sayakhatkyzy) – 50:20	6–0
Shegay (Moldabay) – 53:42	7–0
Zubkova (Meskini, M. Sayakhatkyzy) – 55:28	8–0
Pyatkova (Ashimova, Olzhabayeva) (PP) – 57:44	9–0

2 min
Penalties
14 min
64
Shots
5

6 February; 15:30	South Korea	11–0 (2–0, 5–0, 4–0)	Thailand	Harbin Sport University Stadium, Harbin; Attendance: 1,014

Game reference

Kim Yeon-ju
Bae Jeong-yeon
Goalies
Thamida Kunthadapakorn
Wilaksaya Watthanakulcharoenchai
Referees:
Liu Lu (CHN)
Song Meina (CHN)

Jung S. (Choi, Park Ju-Y.) – 02:12	1–0
Eom (Choi) – 05:16	2–0
Kim S. (Kim D., Park J.A.) – 22:31	3–0
Choi (Lee E. Sr., Kim S.) (PP) – 32:54	4–0
Eom (Choi) – 34:06	5–0
Lee E. Sr. (Park J.A., Lee E. Jr.) – 36:29	6–0
Park Y. (Kang N., Song) – 38:54	7–0
Lee E. Jr. (Lee E. Sr., Park J.A.) – 45:12	8–0
Park M. (Jung Y., Kang N.) – 47:59	9–0
Park Ji-Y. (Eom, Lee S.) – 53:45	10–0
Han Y. (Han S., Kim S.) – 55:44	11–0

6 min
Penalties
6 min
72
Shots
1

6 February; 19:30	Kazakhstan	5–1 (1–1, 4–0, 0–0)	Chinese Taipei	Harbin Sport University Stadium, Harbin; Attendance: 1,129

Game reference

Arina Chshyokolova
Goalies
Hsu Tzu-ting
Wang Yun-tzu
Referees:
Lee Kyung-sun (KOR)
Wan Mei Wah (MAS)

	0–1	04:23 – Wu (Lin C.)
Sviridova – 12:24	1–1
Filimonova (Shegay, Orazbayeva) – 23:20	2–1
Butorina (Zubkova, Voronova) – 24:58	3–1
Aldabergenova (Sviridova, Ashimova) – 29:44	4–1
Filimonova (Orazbayeva, Moldabay) – 31:03	5–1

0 min
Penalties
14 min
50
Shots
16

8 February; 15:30	Chinese Taipei	2–3 (0–1, 1–0, 1–2)	South Korea	Harbin Sport University Stadium, Harbin; Attendance: 1,067

Game reference

Hsu Tzu-ting
Goalies
Kim Yeon-ju
Referees:
Liu Lu (CHN)
Wan Mei Wah (MAS)

	0–1	06:55 – Park Ji-Y. (Lee E. Jr., Kim D.)
Yeh H. (Lin Y.) – 28:04	1–1
	1–2	47:27 – Jung S. (Kang N., Choi)
Huang Y. (Chang E.N., Wu) – 49:33	2–2
	2–3	59:45 – Kim S. (Park J.A., Lee E. Jr.) (PP)

12 min
Penalties
0 min
7
Shots
76

8 February; 19:30	Hong Kong	1–2 (0–0, 1–1, 0–1)	Thailand	Harbin Sport University Stadium, Harbin; Attendance: 1,097

Game reference

Mok Hei Lam
Goalies
Thamida Kunthadapakorn
Referees:
Miyuki Nakayama (JPN)
Song Meina (CHN)

Lam (Tsui, Ip) – 25:47	1–0
	1–1	38:54 – Sakchaicharoenkul (Vorawat, Panyamaneerat)
	1–2	51:26 – Vorawat (Thamma, Jittresin)

6 min
Penalties
4 min
32
Shots
25

9 February; 15:30	South Korea	0–1 OT (0–0, 0–0, 0–0) (OT: 0–1)	Kazakhstan	Harbin Sport University Stadium, Harbin; Attendance: 1,033

Game reference
Kim Yeon-ju	Goalies	Arina Chshyokolova	Referees: Liu Lu (CHN); Miyuki Nakayama (JPN)
0–1 / 62:01 – Shegay			Referees: Liu Lu (CHN); Miyuki Nakayama (JPN)
0 min	Penalties	6 min	Referees: Liu Lu (CHN); Miyuki Nakayama (JPN)
21	Shots	16	Referees: Liu Lu (CHN); Miyuki Nakayama (JPN)

9 February; 19:30	Chinese Taipei	6–1 (2–0, 4–0, 0–1)	Hong Kong	Harbin Sport University Stadium, Harbin; Attendance: 1,048

Game reference

Hsu Tzu-ting
Wang Yun-tzu
Goalies
Mok Hei Lam
Olivia LLoren
Referees:
Lee Kyung-sun (KOR)
Song Meina (CHN)

Chang E.N. (Lin C., Huang Y.) – 09:35	1–0
Kao (Hsieh) – 17:24	2–0
Huang Y. (Liu Y., Lin Y.) – 28:52	3–0
Chang E.W. (Hsieh, Yeh H.) – 30:20	4–0
Chang E.W. (Hsieh) – 33:49	5–0
Yeh H. (Hsieh, Sha) – 37:19	6–0
	6–1	54:20 – C. Wong (Wong K.)

0 min
Penalties
0 min
38
Shots
14

=== Final round ===
Pos	Team	Pld	W	OW	OL	L	GF	GA	GD	Pts
1	Japan	3	3	0	0	0	18	1	+17	9
2	Kazakhstan	3	2	0	0	1	5	5	0	6
3	China	3	1	0	0	2	4	11	−7	3
4	South Korea	3	0	0	0	3	1	11	−10	0

Source: OCA

12 February; 10:00	Kazakhstan	0–4 (0–1, 0–1, 0–2)	Japan	Harbin Sport University Stadium, Harbin; Attendance: 1,031

Game reference

Arina Chshyokolova
Goalies
Riko Kawaguchi
Referees:
Lee Kyung-sun (KOR)
Song Meina (CHN)

0–1	16:26 – Enomoto (H. Yamashita, Wajima)
0–2	20:17 – Rir. Noro (Shiga, Ukita)
0–3	42:57 – Wajima (Ukita, Sato)
0–4	48:10 – Ito (Shiga, Sato)

4 min
Penalties
2 min
7
Shots
41

12 February; 14:00	China	2–1 (1–0, 0–1, 1–0)	South Korea	Harbin Sport University Stadium, Harbin; Attendance: 1,187

Game reference

Lai Guimin
Goalies
Kim Yeon-ju
Referees:
Miyuki Nakayama (JPN)
Wan Mei Wah (MAS)

Wu (Wang J.) – 10:50	1–0
	1–1	25:44 – Eom (Park Ji-Y.)
Fang (Wang J., Kong) – 48:38	2–1

9 min
Penalties
6 min
24
Shots
24

13 February; 10:00	Japan	6–0 (3–0, 2–0, 1–0)	South Korea	Harbin Sport University Stadium, Harbin; Attendance: 979

Game reference

Haruka Kuromaru
Goalies
Kim Yeon-ju
Park Jong-ju
Referees:
Liu Lu (CHN)
Song Meina (CHN)

Ukita (Sato) – 10:47	1–0
Ukita (Koyama, Ito) – 15:12	2–0
Wajima (Ito, Hosoyamada) – 18:17	3–0
Maeda (Wajima, Koike) – 24:49	4–0
Wajima (Maeda, Koike) – 32:40	5–0
Maeda (Miura, Koike) – 53:44	6–0

4 min
Penalties
2 min
45
Shots
9

13 February; 14:00	China	1–2 (0–0, 0–1, 1–1)	Kazakhstan	Harbin Sport University Stadium, Harbin; Attendance: 1,167

Game reference

Lai Guimin
Goalies
Arina Chshyokolova
Referees:
Miyuki Nakayama (JPN)
Wan Mei Wah (MAS)

	0–1	35:29 – Filimonova (Shegay, Orazbayeva) (PP)
Wang J. (Qu) – 42:36	1–1
	1–2	48:37 – Shegay (Orazbayeva)

8 min
Penalties
0 min
34
Shots
23

14 February; 10:00	South Korea	0–3 (0–1, 0–0, 0–2)	Kazakhstan	Harbin Sport University Stadium, Harbin; Attendance: 862

Game reference

Kim Yeon-ju
Goalies
Arina Chshyokolova
Referees:
Song Meina (CHN)
Wan Mei Wah (MAS)

0–1	05:58 – Aldabergenova (Shegay, Tursynova) (PP)
0–2	43:23 – Butorina
0–3	53:30 – Moldabay

11 min
Penalties
10 min
23
Shots
22

14 February; 14:00	Japan	8–1 (3–1, 2–0, 3–0)	China	Harbin Sport University Stadium, Harbin; Attendance: 1,198

Game reference

Miyuu Masuhara
Goalies
Lai Guimin
Wang Yuqing
Referees:
Liu Lu (CHN)
Miyuki Nakayama (JPN)

Koyama (Ito) – 02:51	1–0
	1–1	06:59 – Kong (Yu) (PP)
Shiga (Ukita, Koyama) – 08:10	2–1
Ito (Ukita) (PP) – 16:42	3–1
Maeda (Koike, Hosoyamada) – 30:01	4–1
Koyama (Koike, Hosoyamada) (PP) – 32:10	5–1
Miura (Ukita) – 40:34	6–1
Ukita (Miura, Ito) – 42:40	7–1
H. Yamashita – 46:07	8–1

6 min
Penalties
8 min
40
Shots
13

== Final standing ==
Rank	Team	Pld	W	OW	OL	L
1st place, gold medalist(s)	Japan	3	3	0	0	0
2nd place, silver medalist(s)	Kazakhstan	7	5	1	0	1
3rd place, bronze medalist(s)	China	3	1	0	0	2
4	South Korea	7	3	0	1	3
5	Chinese Taipei	4	2	0	0	2
6	Thailand	4	1	0	0	3
7	Hong Kong	4	0	0	0	4
