= Shiori Yamashita =

Japanese ice hockey player (born 2002)

- Born: 28 April 2002 (age 24) Osaka, Japan
- Height: 1.58 m (5 ft 2 in)
- Weight: 53 kg (117 lb; 8 st 5 lb)
- Position: Defense
- Shoots: Left
- WJIHL team Former teams: Seibu Princess Rabbits; DK Peregrine
- National team: Japan
- Playing career: 2018–present
Medal record
Asian Winter Games
Gold medal – first place	2025 Harbin	Team
World University Games
Silver medal – second place	2023 Lake Placid	Team

Shiori Yamashita (山下 栞, Yamashita Shiori; born 28 April 2002) is a Japanese ice hockey player and member of the Japanese national team, currently playing with the Seibu Princess Rabbits in the Women's Japan Ice Hockey League (WJIHL) and All-Japan Women's Ice Hockey Championship.

She represented Japan at the 2019 IIHF Women's World Championship. She represented Japan at the 2023 Winter World University Games, winning a silver medal.

Her sister, Hikaru Yamashita, also plays for the Japanese national team.
