= Miyuu Masuhara =

Japanese ice hockey player (born 2001)

Miyuu Masuhara 増原 海夕
- Born: 4 October 2001 (age 25) Hokkaido, Japan
- Height: 1.57 m (5 ft 2 in)
- Weight: 53 kg (117 lb; 8 st 5 lb)
- Position: Goaltender
- Catches: Left
- WJIHL team: DK Peregrine
- National team: Japan
- Playing career: c. 2015–present
Medal record
Asian Winter Games
Gold medal – first place	2025 Harbin	Team
World University Games
Silver medal – second place	2023 Lake Placid	Team

Miyuu Masuhara (Japanese: 増原海夕, ますはら みゆう, Hepburn: Masuhara Miyū; born 4 October 2001) is a Japanese ice hockey goaltender and member of the Japanese national team, currently playing with DK Peregrine in the Women's Japan Ice Hockey League (WJIHL) and All-Japan Women's Ice Hockey Championship.

== Playing career ==
As a junior player with the Japanese national under-18 team, she participated in the 2016 IIHF U18 Women's World Championship.

Masuhara was a part of the Japanese delegation at the 2022 Winter Olympics in Beijing. Selected as a reserve player for the women's ice hockey tournament, she did not dress for any games.

She was Japan's starting goaltender at the 2022 IIHF Women's World Championship, where she maintained a steady 91.48 save percentage across six games and recorded a 61-shot shutout against Finland in the fifth place game.

Masuhara won a silver medal with the Japanese team in the women's ice hockey tournament at the 2023 Winter World University Games in Lake Placid, New York.

== Career statistics ==
=== International ===
Note: GP = Games played; Min, TOI = Minutes played; W = Wins; L = Losses; T,T/OT = Ties; OTL = Overtime losses; GA = Goals-against; GAA = Goals-against average; SO = Shutouts; SV% = Save percentage;

				Regular season
Year	Team	Event	Result	GP	W	L	T/OT	MIN	GA	SO	GAA	SV%
2022	Japan	WC	5th	6	2	4	0	349:48	19	0	3.26	0.915
2022	Japan	OG	6th	0
2023	Japan	WC	7th	4	0	4	0	147:28	13	0	5.29	0.889
2024	Japan	WC	8th	2	0	2	0	96:41	6	0	3.72	0.807
2025	Japan	AWG	1st place, gold medalist(s)	1	1	0	0	60:00	1	0	1.00	0.923
2025	Japan	WC	7th	5	3	2	0	298:03	13	0	2.62	0.926
2026	Japan	OGQ	Q	2	2	0	0	120:00	1	0	0.50	0.966
2026	Japan	OG	9th	3	1	2	0	137:18	8	0	3.50	0.867
