= Kohane Sato =

Japanese ice hockey player (born 2006)

Kohane Sato 佐藤 虹羽
- Born: 16 March 2006 (age 20) Kushiro, Hokkaido, Japan
- Height: 1.64 m (5 ft 5 in)
- Weight: 63 kg (139 lb; 9 st 13 lb)
- Position: Defenceman
- Shoots: Left
- WJIHL team: Daishin IHC
- National team: Japan
Medal record
Asian Winter Games
Gold medal – first place	2025 Harbin	Team
IIHF World Women's U18 Championship
Gold medal – first place	2022 (Div I-A)	Team
Gold medal – first place	2024 (Div I-A)	Team

Kohane Sato (Japanese: 佐藤 虹羽, さとう こはね, Hepburn: Satō Kohane; born 16 March 2006) is a Japanese ice hockey defenceman who plays for Daishin in the Women's Japan Ice Hockey League (WJIHL) and is a member of the Japan women's national ice hockey team. She won a gold medal with Japan at the 2025 Asian Winter Games. She represented Japan at the 2026 Winter Olympics.

== Playing career ==
Sato plays domestically for Daishin and (as of 2026) studies at the Kushiro Public University of Economics. She attended Hokkaido Kushiro Commercial High School in Kushiro.

== International play ==
Sato has represented Japan at the IIHF Women's World Championship Top Division (2022–2025). She also appeared for Japan in the 2026 Winter Olympics women's tournament, recording two assists in four games.

At the junior level, she captained Japan at the 2024 IIHF U18 Women's World Championship Division I Group A, helping the team earn promotion to the Top Division.

She participated in women's ice hockey tournament at the 2026 Winter Olympics.

Making her Olympic debut on 6 February, Japan opposed France. Wearing number six, Sato logged 22:22 of ice time, recording an assist.

She was one of 17 teenagers that played in women's ice hockey at the 2026 Winter Olympics.

== Personal life ==
Sato is from Kushiro, Hokkaido. The Japanese Olympic Committee lists her as a second-year student at the Kushiro Public University of Economics in 2026.

== Career statistics ==
=== International ===
Statistics are from the JIHF and IIHF.

Year	Team	Event	Result	GP	G	A	Pts	PIM
2022	Japan	U18 (Div I-A)	1st place, gold medalist(s)	4	0	5	5	2
2022	Japan	WC	5th	5	0	0	0	4
2023	Japan	U18	8th	5	0	0	0	8
2023	Japan	WC	7th	6	0	0	0	0
2024	Japan	U18 (Div I-A)	1st place, gold medalist(s)	5	3	3	6	6
2024	Japan	WC	8th	5	0	1	1	0
2025	Japan	Final Olympic Qualification (Group G)	1st place, gold medalist(s)	3	0	0	0	0
2025	Japan	WC	7th	5	0	1	1	0
2026	Japan	OG		4	0	2	2	4
Junior totals				14	3	8	11	16
Senior totals				28	0	4	4	8
