= Rui Ukita =

Japanese ice hockey player (born 1996)

Rui Ukita 浮田 留衣
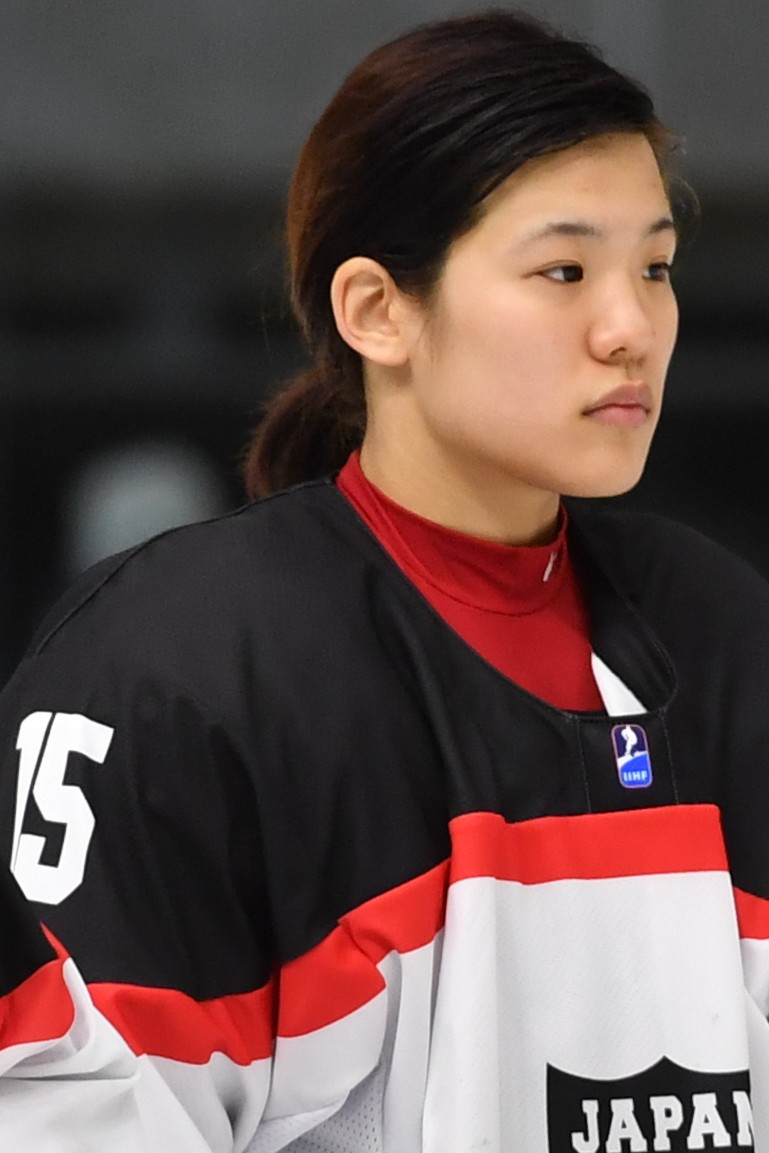
- Ukita in 2017
- Born: 6 June 1996 (age 30) Hokkaido, Japan
- Height: 1.69 m (5 ft 7 in)
- Weight: 70 kg (154 lb; 11 st 0 lb)
- Position: Forward
- Shoots: Left
- WJIHL team: Daishin IHC
- National team: Japan
- Playing career: 2012–present
Medal record
Asian Winter Games
Gold medal – first place	2017 Sapporo	Team
Gold medal – first place	2025 Harbin	Team
Asia Championship
Gold medal – first place	2025 China

Rui Ukita (浮田留衣, Ukita Rui; born 6 June 1996) is a Japanese ice hockey player and three-time Olympian with the Japanese national team. She has played her senior club career with Daishin Ice Hockey Club in the Women's Japan Ice Hockey League (WJIHL) and All-Japan Women's Ice Hockey Championship.

== International play ==
As a junior ice hockey player with the Japanese national under-18 team, Ukita participated in three IIHF U18 Women's World Championships. She was the top scoring defender at the 2012 Division I tournament, amassing five points across five games. The following year, her four goals at the 2013 Division I tournament led all skaters and helped Japan earn promotion to the Top Division, for which she was recognized as Best Defenseman by the tournament directorate.

Ukita competed at both the 2014 and the 2018 Winter Olympics. Additionally, she participated at the IIHF World Women's Championship in 2015, 2016, 2017 (in Division IA), and 2019.
