= Suzuka Maeda =

Japanese ice hockey player (born 1996)

- Born: 16 October 1996 (age 30) Hokkaido, Japan
- Height: 1.61 m (5 ft 3 in)
- Weight: 51 kg (112 lb; 8 st 0 lb)
- Position: Forward
- Shoots: Right
- JWIHC team: DK Perigrine
- National team: Japan
- Playing career: 2015–present
Medal record
Asian Winter Games
Gold medal – first place	2025 Harbin	Team

Suzuka Maeda (高 涼風, Maeda Suzuka; born 16 October 1996) (née Suzuka Taka) is a Japanese ice hockey player for DK Perigrine and the Japanese national team. She participated at the 2015 IIHF Women's World Championship.

Taka competed at the 2018 Winter Olympics.
