= Yuji Iizuka =

Japanese ice hockey player and coach

- Born: 17 May 1974 (age 51)
- Height: 1.74 m (5 ft 9 in)
- Weight: 74 kg (163 lb; 11 st 9 lb)
- Position: Forward
- Shot: Left
- Played for: Oji Eagles
- Playing career: 1993–2001

Yuji Iizuka (飯塚 祐司, Iizuka Yūji; born 17 May 1974) is a Japanese retired ice hockey player and the head coach for the Japanese women's national ice hockey team. He coached the team at the 2019 IIHF Women's World Championship and the 2022 Winter Olympics.
