= Kim Se-lin =

South Korean ice hockey player

- Born: 3 April 2000 (age 26) South Korea
- Height: 156 cm (5 ft 1 in)
- Weight: 60 kg (132 lb; 9 st 6 lb)
- Position: Defence
- Shoots: Left
- KWHL team Former teams: Suwon City Hall WIHT; Ice Avengers
- National team: South Korea and Korea
- Playing career: c. 2015–present

- Kim Se-lin
- Hangul: 김세린
- RR: Gim Serin
- MR: Kim Serin

Kim Se-lin (born 3 April 2000) is a South Korean ice hockey player and member of the South Korean national ice hockey team, currently playing in the Korean Women's Hockey League (KWHL) with the Suwon City Hall women's ice hockey team.

== Playing career ==
Kim participated in the women's ice hockey tournament at the 2018 Winter Olympics as part of a unified team of 35 players drawn from both the North Korean and South Korean national teams. The team's coach was Sarah Murray and the team was in Group B competing against Switzerland, Japan, and Sweden.
