= Seibu Princess Rabbits =

WJIHL ice hockey team in Nishitōkyō, Japan

Seibu Princess Rabbits SEIBUプリンセスラビッツ
- City: Nishitōkyō, Tōkyō, Japan
- League: Women's Japan Ice Hockey League
- Founded: 1974
- Home arena: Higashiyamato Skating Center
- Colours: Blue, cyan, silver
- Owner: Seibu Group
- Head coach: Tomohito Ohkubo ( 大久保 智仁)
- Captain: Kanami Seki (関 夏菜美)
- Website: princessrabbits.com

Franchise history
- 1974–1993: Kokudo Keikaku WIHC
- 1993–2007: Kokudo Ladies IHC
- 2005–: Seibu Princess Rabbits

Championships
- All-Japan Championship: 13 (1984, 1986, 1987, 1989, 1990, 1993, 2008, 2009, 2010, 2012, 2016, 2018, 2024)
- WJIHL Championship: 9 (2012–13, 2013–14, 2014–15, 2015–16, 2016–17, 2017–18, 2018–19, 2019–20, 2023–24)

The Seibu Princess Rabbits (Japanese: SEIBUプリンセスラビッツ, romanized: Seibu Purinsesu Rabittsu) is an amateur ice hockey team in the Women's Japan Ice Hockey League and All-Japan Women's Ice Hockey Championship. They are based in Nishitōkyō, a city in the western Tōkyō Metropolis, and play at the Higashiyamato Skating Center.

== History ==
The team was founded in 1974 as Kokudo Keikaku (Japanese: 国土計画女子アイスホッケークラブ, romanized: Kokudo keikaku joshi aisuhokkēkurabu, lit. 'National Land Planning Women's Ice Hockey Club'). It was one of the first women's ice hockey clubs to be created in Japan, establishing itself less than one year after Isetan, the officially recognized first women's team in Japan. Throughout the mid-1970s, Kokudo Keikaku regularly participated in self-organized matches against Isetan and the Mandai Memorial Club (Japanese: 満大メモリアルクラブ), the other women's teams in the region.

In 1978, an unofficial women's ice hockey national championship was independently created by a small number of teams from Hokkaido and the Tokyo Metropolis. Kokudo Keikaku was one of the founding members of the unofficial championship and participated in every tournament during 1978 to 1982. In 1982, the Japan Ice Hockey Federation sanctioned the tournament for the first time and it has been played as the official All-Japan Women's Ice Hockey Championship ever since.

For the following three decades, the All-Japan Championship was the only top level women's ice hockey tournament in Japan. In practice, this meant that Kokudo Keikaku played just three or four games of record during the three day tournament each season and generally played less than ten games total per season, including friendlies organized between other All-Japan Championship team or with teams outside of Japan. The team first claimed the title of Japanese Champion at the third All-Japan Championship, in 1984, and were contenders throughout the 1980s and early 1990s, winning six Championships during 1984 to 1993.

In 1993, the team was renamed as the Kokudo Ladies Ice Hockey Club (Japanese: コクドレディースアイスホッケークラブ). The name change inadvertently marked the beginning of a 15-year All-Japan Championship victory drought, which persisted through a second name change in 2006.

Kokudo Ladies were renamed as Seibu Princess Rabbits in 2006, when the Seibu Group became the team's primary sponsor. The new name was adapted as the women's counterpart to the Seibu Prince Rabbits, an Asia League team founded in 1972, which were named after Seibu Group and Seibu Group's principal holding, Prince Hotels.

== Season-by-season results ==
This is a list of all seasons completed by Seibu Princess Rabbits since the creation of the WJIHL in 2012.

Note: Finish = Rank at end of regular season; GP = Games played, W = Wins (3 points), OTW = Overtime wins (2 points), OTL = Overtime losses (1 point), L = Losses, GF = Goals for, GA = Goals against, Pts = Points, Top scorer: Points (Goals+Assists)

Season	Women's Japan Ice Hockey League								All-Japan Championship results
Season	Regular season							Championship results	All-Japan Championship results
Season	GP	W	OTW	OTL	L	GF	GA	Championship results	All-Japan Championship results
2012–13	8	8	0	0	0	39	6	Won Championship	Runner up
2013–14								Won Championship, 3–0 (Samsung Daito Peregrine)	Third place
2014–15								Won Championship	Runner up
2015–16								Won Championship, 4–0 (Daishin)	Won Championship
2016–17								Won Championship, 3–1 (DK Peregrine)	Runner up
2017–18								Won Championship, 3–2 (DK Peregrine)	Won Championship
2018–19								Won Championship, 5–1 (DK Peregrine)	Runner up
2019–20								Won Championship, 3–0 (DK Peregrine)	Cancelled due to COVID-19 pandemic
2020–21								Lost final, 0–2 (DK Peregrine)	Third place
2021–22								Cancelled due to COVID-19 variant	
2022–23								Third place, 4–3 (Toyota Cygnus)	Fourth place
2023–24								Won Championship, 1–0 (DK Peregrine)	Won Championship

== Players and personnel ==
=== 2025–26 roster ===
As of 6 August 2025

No.	Nat	Player	Pos	S/G	Age	Acquired	Birthplace
3	(Japan)	Aiko Yoshikawa	D		21		
16	(Japan)	Yoshino Enomoto	F	R	27		Osaka, Kansai, Japan
18	(Japan)	Rion Suzuki	F	R	20		
20	(Japan)	Haruna Nomura	D		23		
31	(Japan)	Hana Kitajima	G	R	25		
77	(Japan)	Kiku Kobayashi	G	L	24		
29	(Japan)	Ririna Takenaka	G	L	21		
61	(Japan)	Suzuno Fukuda	G	L	18		
15	(Japan)	Remi Koyama	F	R	26		
26	(Japan)	Sakura Ito	F		23		
8	(Japan)	Urara Honda	F				
17	(Japan)	Kyo Asahina	F	R	20		
33	(Japan)	Momoka Okamura	F	L	18		
14	(Japan)	Lily Sato	D	L	17		
19	(Japan)	Aoi Sawada	F	R	21		
7	(Japan)	Marin Nagaoka	F	R	24		
27	(Japan)	Kokoro Ohta	D	L	26		Hokkaido, Japan
23	(Japan)	Yu Hatade	F		23		
24	(Japan)	Kanami Seki	D	L	26		
21	(Japan)	Cocoro Gotoh	F	L	19		
10	(Japan)	Aila Wik	D	L	24		
12	(Japan)	Ayana Honma	F	R	19		
11	(Japan)	Hikaru Yamashita	F	L	25		
5	(Japan)	Shiori Yamashita	D	L	24		

Coaching staff and team personnel

- General Manager: Ayako Senoo (瀬野尾綾子)
- Director: Tomohito Ohkubo (大久保智仁)
- Coach: Yoshikazu Kashino (樫野善一)
- Coach: Tomohiko Uchiyama (内山朋彦)
- Coach: Natsumi Kurokawa (黒川奈津美)
- Trainer: (野田泰佑)
- Trainer: (甲斐千尋)
- Trainer: (安田理彩)
- Trainer: (小泉翔矢)
- Sports Pharmacist: (林田千春)
- Equipment Manager: Yutaka Kuribayashi (栗林豊)

== Team honours ==
=== Japanese Championship ===
All-Japan Women's Ice Hockey Championship

- (gold) Champions (13): 1984, 1986, 1987, 1989, 1990, 1993, 2008, 2009, 2010, 2012, 2016, 2018, 2024
- (silver) Runners-up (15): 1985, 1988, 1991, 1992, 1994, 1995, 2001, 2005, 2006, 2007, 2011, 2013, 2015, 2017, 2019
- (bronze) Third Place (7): 1997, 1998, 1999, 2000, 2003, 2014, 2021

Women's Japan Ice Hockey League

- (gold) Champions (9): 2012–13, 2013–14, 2014–15, 2015–16, 2016–17, 2017–18, 2019–20, 2023–24
- (silver) Runners-up (1): 2020–21
- (bronze) Third Place (1): 2022–23
