= Hikaru Yamashita =

Japanese ice hockey player

Hikaru Yamashita 山下 光
- Born: 23 September 2000 (age 26)
- Height: 1.57 m (5 ft 2 in)
- Weight: 52 kg (115 lb; 8 st 3 lb)
- Position: Forward
- Shoots: Left
- SDHL team Former teams: AIK Hockey; Seibu Princess Rabbits; DK Peregrine
- National team: Japan
- Playing career: 2018–present
Medal record
Asian Winter Games
Gold medal – first place	2025 Harbin	Team

Hikaru Yamashita (Japanese: 山下光, Hepburn: Yamashita Hikaru; born 23 September 2000) is a Japanese ice hockey player and member of the Japanese national team, currently playing in the Swedish Women's Hockey League (SDHL) with AIK IF.

She represented Japan at the IIHF Women's World Championships in 2019 and 2021.

Her sister, Shiori Yamashita, also plays for the Japanese national team.
