= Japan women's national under-18 ice hockey team =

Japan
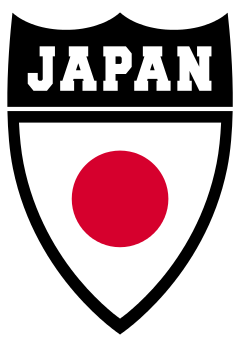
- Association: Japan Ice Hockey Federation
- General manager: Yuji Iizuka
- Head coach: Yujiro Kasahara
- Assistants: Kanae Aoki; Hanae Kubo; Mitsuaki Inoue
- Captain: Kika Terauchi (2025)
- Most games: Airi Sato (21); Akane Shiga (21); Kaho Suzuki (21)
- Top scorer: Rui Ukita (13)
- Most points: Rui Ukita (18)
- IIHF code: JPN

First international
- Japan 3 – 1 Austria (Chambéry, France; 29 December 2008)

Biggest win
- Japan 13 – 0 Norway (Győr, Hungary; 6 April 2022)

Biggest defeat
- Canada 17 – 0 Japan (Vantaa, Finland; 9 January 2025)

IIHF U18 Women's World Championship
- Appearances: 5 (first in 2010)
- Best result: 6th (2010)

International record (W–L–T)
- 26–24–0

The Japanese women's national under 18 ice hockey team is the national under-18 ice hockey team of Japan. It is organized by the Japan Ice Hockey Federation. The team represents Japan at the International Ice Hockey Federation's U18 Women's World Championship and other international tournaments and events.

== U18 Women's World Championship record ==
Year	GP	W	L	GF	GA	Pts	Rank
(France) 2009	4	4	0	18	5	15	9th place (1st in Division I; promoted to Top Division)
(United States) 2010	5	1	4	9	23	3	6th place
(Sweden) 2011	6	1	5	9	23	3	8th place ( Relegated to Division I)
(Norway) 2012	5	3	2*	14	7	11	11th place (3rd in Division I)
(Switzerland) 2013	5	5^	0	18	7	14	9th place (1st in Division I; promoted to Top Division)
(Hungary) 2014	5	2	3	14	17	6	7th place
(United States) 2015	5	0	5**	8	15	1	8th place ( Relegated to Division I)
(Hungary) 2016	5	5	0	18	2	15	9th place (1st in Division I; promoted to Top Division)
(Czech Republic) 2017	5	0	5**	6	14	1	8th place ( Relegated to Division I Group A)
(Italy) 2018	5	5	0	21	1	15	9th place (1st in Division I Group A; promoted to Top Division)
(Japan) 2019	6	1	5	7	18	3	8th place ( Relegated to Division I Group A)
(Germany) 2020	5	4	1	20	3	12	10th place (2nd in Division I Group A)
2021	Tournament cancelled due to COVID-19 pandemic						
(Hungary) 2022	4	4	0	26	0	12	9th place (1st in Division I Group A; promoted to Top Division)
(Sweden) 2023	5	0	5	6	20	0	8th place ( Relegated to Division I Group A)
(Italy) 2024	5	5	0	21	4	15	9th place (1st in Division I Group A; promoted to Top Division)
(Finland) 2025	4	0	0	4**	7	20	8th place ( Relegated to Division I Group A)

*Includes two losses in extra time (in the preliminary round)
^Includes one win in extra time (in the preliminary round)
**Includes one loss in extra time (in the relegation round)

== Team ==
=== Current roster ===
Roster for the 2025 IIHF U18 Women's World Championship.

Head coach: Yujiro Kasahara
Assistant coaches: Kanae Aoki, Hanae Kubo, Mitsuaki Inoue (goaltender)

No.	Pos.	Name	Height	Weight	Birthdate	Team
1	G	Haruka Kuromaru	1.67 m (5 ft 6 in)	54 kg (119 lb)	29 March 2007 (age 19)	(Japan) Crystal Blades
2	D	Nana Akimoto	1.59 m (5 ft 3 in)	46 kg (101 lb)	8 April 2009 (age 17)	(Japan) DK Peregrine
3	D	Yuna Baba	1.54 m (5 ft 1 in)	54 kg (119 lb)	22 November 2008 (age 17)	(Japan) DK Peregrine
4	D	Lily Sato	1.72 m (5 ft 8 in)	74 kg (163 lb)	28 April 2009 (age 17)	(Japan) Nikko Ice Bucks
5	D	Rino Tada	1.55 m (5 ft 1 in)	57 kg (126 lb)	13 November 2008 (age 17)	(Japan) Daishin
6	D	Koko Ruike	1.58 m (5 ft 2 in)	55 kg (121 lb)	14 May 2009 (age 17)	(Japan) TC Mikage Gretz
7	D	Riko Nishiuchi	1.56 m (5 ft 1 in)	56 kg (123 lb)	18 June 2009 (age 17)	(Japan) Nishinomiya Ladies
8	D	Mayu Hosogoe	1.60 m (5 ft 3 in)	52 kg (115 lb)	8 July 2008 (age 18)	(Japan) Toyota Cygnus
9	D	Kika Terauchi – C	1.66 m (5 ft 5 in)	74 kg (163 lb)	2 June 2008 (age 18)	(Canada) Mississauga Hurricanes
11	F	Momoka Okumura	1.49 m (4 ft 11 in)	47 kg (104 lb)	3 March 2008 (age 18)	(Japan) Seibu Princess Rabbits
12	F	Nanaho Yamaguchi	1.52 m (5 ft 0 in)	44 kg (97 lb)	23 June 2008 (age 18)	(Japan) Toyota Cygnus
13	F	Hina Fukuyama – A	1.54 m (5 ft 1 in)	54 kg (119 lb)	11 July 2007 (age 19)	(Japan) Daishin
14	F	Saika Kiyokawa	1.60 m (5 ft 3 in)	52 kg (115 lb)	31 October 2009 (age 16)	(Japan) Toyota Cygnus
15	F	Roco Maeda	1.61 m (5 ft 3 in)	59 kg (130 lb)	17 July 2009 (age 17)	(Japan) Toyota Cygnus
16	F	Umeka Odaira	1.62 m (5 ft 4 in)	52 kg (115 lb)	12 December 2008 (age 17)	(Japan) Daishin
17	F	Reina Kakuta	1.60 m (5 ft 3 in)	54 kg (119 lb)	25 November 2009 (age 16)	(Japan) DK Peregrine
18	F	Azumi Numabe	1.62 m (5 ft 4 in)	57 kg (126 lb)	22 August 2008 (age 18)	(Japan) Daishin
19	F	Aona Shida	1.60 m (5 ft 3 in)	53 kg (117 lb)	8 June 2009 (age 17)	(United States) Northwood School
20	F	Momona Fukuzawa	1.50 m (4 ft 11 in)	47 kg (104 lb)	23 October 2009 (age 16)	(Japan) DK Peregrine
22	F	Tsumugi Ito	1.66 m (5 ft 5 in)	58 kg (128 lb)	27 April 2009 (age 17)	(Japan) TC Mikage Gretz
23	F	Hina Nemoto	1.52 m (5 ft 0 in)	52 kg (115 lb)	16 April 2008 (age 18)	(Japan) Daishin
29	G	Rio Suzuki	1.56 m (5 ft 1 in)	56 kg (123 lb)	21 July 2009 (age 17)	(Japan) Ladies Rabbits
30	G	Rin Kawaguchi	1.63 m (5 ft 4 in)	53 kg (117 lb)	15 November 2010 (age 15)	(Japan) Hokkaido Barbarians

Team biometrics

- Average age: 15
- Average height: 1.59 m (5 ft 3 in)
- Average weight: 55 kg (121 lb)

== See also ==
- Japan women's national ice hockey team
- Women's Japan Ice Hockey League
- All-Japan Women's Ice Hockey Championship
