= Women's Japan Ice Hockey League =

Ice hockey league in Japan

Women's Japan Ice Hockey League 女子日本アイスホッケーリーグ Smile Japan League
- Sport: Ice hockey
- Founded: 2012
- Founder: Japan Ice Hockey Federation
- No. of teams: 12
- Most recent champion: Daishin IHC (2025–26)
- Most titles: Seibu Princess Rabbits (9)
- Domestic cup: All-Japan Women's Ice Hockey Championship

The Women's Japan Ice Hockey League (Japanese: 女子日本アイスホッケーリーグ, Hepburn: Joshi Nihon Aisu Hokkē Rīgu) or WJIHL is the premier women's ice hockey league in Japan. Officially nicknamed the Smile Japan League, it is also known as the Smile League (Japanese: スマイルリーグ). The league was founded in 2012 by the Japan Ice Hockey Federation and is contested in addition to the All-Japan Women's Ice Hockey Championship tournament. Twelve teams participated in the 2023–24 season, of which eight were based in the northern island-province of Hokkaido, two in the Tokyo Metropolis, and two were junior teams comprising youth players from across Japan.

The league’s most successful team, the Seibu Princess Rabbits, won the first eight league titles and have been WJIHL Champions a total of nine times. DK Peregrine claimed second place in seven of the first eight league finals and won the league championship in 2021. Daishin IHC are the only other team to have played in the finals, finishing second in 2014 and winning their first league title in 2023.

== History ==
=== 2012–13 season ===
The first season of the JWIHL, 2012–13, was played in two stages: a placement tournament and a final tournament. In the first stage, held during 5 to 8 October 2012, the ten participating teams were divided into two groups of five and each group played a single round-robin of ten games. The top two teams from each group and the third ranked team with the higher point total from the first stage qualified for the top league and the remaining five teams competed in the lower league of the second stage tournament. The second stage was also played as a single round-robin and was held during 22 to 25 November 2012. The first champions of the WJIHL were the Seibu Princess Rabbits.

== Teams ==
=== 2026–27 season ===
Team	Location	Est.	Head coach	Captain
Daishin IHC	Kushiro	1997	Yūjirō Nakajimaya (中島谷 友二朗)	Kohane Sato (佐藤 虹羽)
Hokkaido Barbarians HC Infinity	Sapporo	2012	Takashi Fujita (藤田 卓志)	Tomoko Sato (佐藤 智子)
Kushiro Bears	Kushiro	1979	Hiroyasu Tōda (任田 大泰)	Ami Sato (佐藤 亜美)
Mikage Gretz	Shimizu	1997	Kazuyoshi Yamaguchi (山口 和良)	An Shinoda (篠田 安)
Obihiro Ladies	Obihiro	2003	Nana Ataka (安宅 奈々)	Airi Sato (佐藤 愛梨)
Peregrine	Tomakomai	1977	Jo Araya (新谷 誠)	Nagisa Sone (曽根 凪紗)
Seibu Princess Rabbits	Nishitōkyō	1974	Ayako Senoo (瀬野尾 綾子)	Marin Nagaoka (長岡 真鈴)
Showa University Blue Winds	Kanagawa		Tatsuki Katayama (片山 立規)	Yui Sonoya (園家 唯)
Toyota Cygnus	Tomakomai	2001	Yuhei Shinohara (篠原 優平)	Makoto Ito (伊藤 優希)
Vortex Sapporo IHC	Sapporo	2012	Nachi Fujimoto (藤本 奈千)	Haruka Ōhata (大畠 陽香)
U18 National Selects		–	Yujiro Kasahara (笠原 裕二郎)	Riko Nishiuchi (西内 璃心)
Jr. High School Selects		–	Kanae Aoki (青木 香奈枝)	Tsumugi Nakajima (中島 紬)

Sources: JIHF

Map of Japan with locations of teams participating in the 2023–24 WJIHL season
Locations of WJIHL teams in Hokkaido.

Team name history

- Bears

→ 1979–1993: Kushiro Bears
→ 1993–2007: Rokkatei Bears
→ 2007–2012: Kamori Kanko Bears
→ 2012–present: Kushiro Bears

- Mikage Gretz

→ 1987–2008: Mikage Gretz
→ 2008–2018: Full-time System Mikage Gretz (FTS Mikage Gretz)
→ 2018–present: Takasu Clinic Mikage Gretz (TC Mikage Gretz)

- Obihiro Ladies
- → 2003–2019: Obihiro Ladies

→ 2019–2023: Obihiro Cranes Ladies
→ 2023–present: Tokachi Obihiro Ladies

- Peregrine

→ 1977–1991: Tomakomai Peregrine
→ 1991–2010: Iwakura Peregrine
→ 2010–2015: Mitsuboshi Daito Peregrine (MD Peregrine)
→ 2015–present: Douro Kensetsu Peregrine (DK Peregrine)

- Princess Rabbits

→ 1974–1992: Kokudo Keikaku WIHC
→ 1992–2006: Kokudo Ladies
→ 2006–present: SEIBU Princess Rabbits

=== Past participants ===
- Daishin B (Kushiro, Hokkaido)
- Daito Kaihatsu Nexus/Tomakomai Nexus (Tomakomai, Hokkaido)
- Ganba X Maria Jaspers
- Hachinohe Reds (Hachinohe, Aomori)
- Makomanai Ladies Ice Hockey Club (Sapporo, Hokkaido)
- Queen Bears (Nishitokyo, Tokyo)

== Champions ==
	Season	(gold) Champion	(silver) Runner-up	(bronze) Third Place	Fourth Place
1st	2012–13	Seibu Princess Rabbits	MD Peregrine	Daishin	FTS Mikage Gretz
2nd	2013–14	Seibu Princess Rabbits	MD Peregrine	Daishin	FTS Mikage Gretz
3rd	2014–15	Seibu Princess Rabbits	MD Peregrine	FTS Mikage Gretz	Toyota Cygnus
4th	2015–16	Seibu Princess Rabbits	Daishin	DK Peregrine	FTS Mikage Gretz
5th	2016–17	Seibu Princess Rabbits	DK Peregrine	Toyota Cygnus	Kushiro Bears
6th	2017–18	Seibu Princess Rabbits	DK Peregrine	FTS Mikage Gretz	Toyota Cygnus
7th	2018–19	Seibu Princess Rabbits	DK Peregrine	Toyota Cygnus	Obihiro Ladies
8th	2019–20	Seibu Princess Rabbits	DK Peregrine	Daishin	Kushiro Bears
9th	2020–21	DK Peregrine	Seibu Princess Rabbits	Daishin	Toyota Cygnus
10th	2021–22	Season cancelled due to the COVID-19 pandemic			
11th	2022–23	Daishin	DK Peregrine	Seibu Princess Rabbits	Toyota Cygnus
12th	2023–24	Seibu Princess Rabbits	DK Peregrine	Daishin	Toyota Cygnus
13th	2024-25	Daishin	Seibu Princess Rabbits	Toyota Cygnus	DK Peregrine

=== All-time medal count ===
Team	1st place, gold medalist(s)	2nd place, silver medalist(s)	3rd place, bronze medalist(s)
Princess Rabbits	9	2	1
Peregrine	1	9	1
Daishin	2	1	5
Mikage Gretz	0	0	2
Cygnus	0	0	3
