= All-Japan Women's Ice Hockey Championship =

Annual ice hockey tournament in Japan

Japanese name
- Kanji: 全日本女子アイスホッケー選手権大会
- Hiragana: ぜんにほんじょしアイスホッケーせんしゅけんたいかい
Transcriptions
- Revised Hepburn: Zen'Nihon Joshi Aisu Hokkē Senshuken Taikai

Tournament information
- Sport: Ice hockey
- Location: Japan
- Established: 1982
- Number of tournaments: 42
- Administrator: Japan Ice Hockey Federation
- Format: Round-robin

Tournament statistics
- First champion: Obihiro Taiyō Club, 1982
- Most titles: Peregrine (21)

Current champion
- Seibu Princess Rabbits, 2024

The All-Japan Women's Ice Hockey Championship (Japanese: 全日本女子アイスホッケー選手権大会) is an annual ice hockey club tournament in Japan. First contested in 1978 and officially sanctioned by the Japan Ice Hockey Federation in 1982, the championship is one of the oldest continuously held women's ice hockey tournaments in the world. The tournament has been contested in addition to the Women's Japan Ice Hockey League (WJIHL) since the league was established in 2012.

It is the women's counterpart to the men's All Japan Ice Hockey Championship.

== Champions ==
#	Year	Host city	(gold) Champion	(silver) Runner-up	(bronze) Third Place	Fourth Place
1	1982	Tōkyō	Obihiro Taiyō Club	Silver Shields	Kushiro Bears	Kokudo Keikaku
2	1983	Hachinohe	Obihiro Taiyō Club	Silver Shields	Kushiro Bears	Hachinohe Marumitsu
3	1984	Fukuoka	Kokudo Keikaku	Kushiro Bears	Obihiro Taiyō Club	Tomakomai Peregrine
4	1985	Kushiro	Tomakomai Peregrine	Kokudo Keikaku	Kushiro Bears	Obihiro Taiyō Club
5	1986	Nikkō	Kokudo Keikaku	Obihiro Taiyō Club	Tomakomai Peregrine	Kushiro Bears
6	1987	Tomakomai	Kokudo Keikaku	Tomakomai Peregrine	Isetan	Obihiro Taiyō Club
7	1988	Karuizawa	Tomakomai Peregrine	Kokudo Keikaku	Obihiro Taiyō Club	Kushiro Bears
8	1989	Kōbe	Kokudo Keikaku	Tomakomai Peregrine	Obihiro Taiyō Club	Kushiro Bears
9	1990	Obihiro	Kokudo Keikaku	Tomakomai Peregrine	Obihiro Taiyō Club	Kushiro Bears
10	1991	Kōbe	Tomakomai Peregrine	Kokudo Keikaku	Obihiro Taiyō Club	Kushiro Bears
11	1992	Sapporo	Iwakura Peregrine	Kokudo Keikaku	Obihiro Taiyō Club	Kushiro Bears
12	1993	Hachinohe	Kokudo Ladies	Iwakura Peregrine	Obihiro Taiyō Club	Kushiro Rokkatei Bears
13	1994	Karuizawa	Iwakura Peregrine	Kokudo Ladies	Kushiro Rokkatei Bears	Kushiro Fanī Dakkusu
14	1995	Karuizawa	Iwakura Peregrine	Kokudo Ladies	Sports System Fighters	Kushiro Rokkatei Bears
15	1996	Sapporo	Iwakura Peregrine	Sports System Fighters	Kushiro Rokkatei Bears	Kokudo Ladies
16	1997	Tomakomai	Iwakura Peregrine	Kushiro Rokkatei Bears	Kokudo Ladies	Sports System Fighters
17	1998	Obihiro	Iwakura Peregrine	Kushiro Rokkatei Bears	Kokudo Ladies	Sports System Fighters
18	1999	Kushiro	Iwakura Peregrine	Rokkatei Bears	Kokudo Ladies	Rokkatei Maruseizu
19	2000	Tomakomai	Rokkatei Bears	Iwakura Peregrine	Kokudo Ladies	Rokkatei Maruseizu
20	2001	Obihiro	Rokkatei Bears	Kokudo Ladies	Iwakura Peregrine	Sapporo Backers
21	2002	Aomori	Iwakura Peregrine	Rokkatei Bears	Daishin	Kokudo Ladies
22	2003	Kushiro	Iwakura Peregrine	Rokkatei Bears	Kokudo Ladies	Daishin
23	2004	Tomari	Iwakura Peregrine	Rokkatei Bears	Daishin	Kokudo Ladies
24	2005	Obihiro	Rokkatei Bears	Kokudo Ladies	Iwakura Peregrine	Daishin
25	2006	Tomakomai	Rokkatei Bears	Kokudo Ladies	Daishin	Iwakura Peregrine
26	2007	Kushiro	Rokkatei Bears	Seibu Princess Rabbits	Iwakura Peregrine	Daishin
27	2008	Kushiro	Seibu Princess Rabbits	Kamori Kankō Bears	Daishin	Iwakura Peregrine
28	2009	Yokohama	Seibu Princess Rabbits	Iwakura Peregrine	Kamori Kankō Bears	Daishin
29	2010	Sapporo	Seibu Princess Rabbits	Daishin	Kamori Kankō Bears	Iwakura Peregrine
30	2011	Obihiro	Samsung Daito Peregrine	Seibu Princess Rabbits	Daishin	Mikage Gretz
31	2012	Sapporo	Seibu Princess Rabbits	Samsung Daito Peregrine	Daishin	FTS Mikage Gretz
32	2013	Obihiro	Samsung Daito Peregrine	Seibu Princess Rabbits	FTS Mikage Gretz	Daishin
33	2014	Sapporo	Samsung Daito Peregrine	Toyota Cygnus	Seibu Princess Rabbits	Daishin
34	2015	Obihiro	Samsung Daito Peregrine	Seibu Princess Rabbits	FTS Mikage Gretz	Daishin
35	2016	Sapporo	Seibu Princess Rabbits	FTS Mikage Gretz	DK Peregrine	Daishin
36	2017	Sapporo	DK Peregrine	Seibu Princess Rabbits	Daishin	FTS Mikage Gretz
37	2018	Sapporo	Seibu Princess Rabbits	DK Peregrine	FTS Mikage Gretz	Daishin
38	2019	Obihiro	DK Peregrine	Seibu Princess Rabbits	Daishin	Takasu Clinic Mikage Gretz
39	2020	Tournament canceled due to COVID-19 pandemic				
40	2021	Sapporo	DK Peregrine	Toyota Cygnus	Seibu Princess Rabbits	Daishin
41	2022	Tournament canceled due to COVID-19 variant				
42	2023	Obihiro	DK Peregrine	Daishin	Toyota Cygnus	Seibu Princess Rabbits
43	2024	Sapporo	Seibu Princess Rabbits	DK Peregrine	Daishin IHC	Toyota Cygnus
44	2025	Kushiro	Daishin	DK Peregrine	Toyota Cygnus	Seibu Princess Rabbits

Team name history

- Bears

→ 1979–1993: Kushiro Bears
→ 1993–2007: Rokkatei Bears
→ 2007–2012: Kamori Kanko Bears
→ 2012–present: Kushiro Bears

- Mikage Gretz

→ 1987–2008: Mikage Gretz
→ 2008–2018: Full-time System Mikage Gretz (FTS Mikage Gretz)
→ 2018–present: Takasu Clinic Mikage Gretz (TC Mikage Gretz)

- Obihiro Ladies

→ 2003–2019: Obihiro Taiyō Club (Obihiro Ladies)
→ 2019–2023: Obihiro Cranes Ladies
→ 2023–present: Tokachi Obihiro Ladies

- Peregrine

→ 1977–1991: Tomakomai Peregrine
→ 1991–2010: Iwakura Peregrine
→ 2010–2015: Mitsuboshi Daito Peregrine (MD Peregrine)
→ 2015–present: Douro Kensetsu Peregrine (DK Peregrine)

- Princess Rabbits

→ 1974–1992: Kokudo Keikaku WIHC
→ 1992–2006: Kokudo Ladies IHC
→ 2006–present: SEIBU Princess Rabbits
