= Sweden at the 2012 Winter Youth Olympics =

- IOC code: SWE
- NOC: Swedish Olympic Committee
- Website: www.sok.se (in Swedish and English)

in Innsbruck
- Competitors: 35 in 9 sports
- Flag bearer: Linn Peterson
- Medals Ranked 13th: Gold 2 Silver 2 Bronze 0 Total 4

Winter Youth Olympics appearances (overview)
- 2012; 2016; 2020; 2024

Sweden competed at the 2012 Winter Youth Olympics in Innsbruck, Austria from January 13 to January 22, 2012. The Swedish Olympic Committee announced the team on December 20, 2011.

== Medalists ==
Medal	Name	Sport	Event	Date
Gold	Magdalena Fjällström	Alpine skiing	Girls' combined	15 Jan
Gold	Sweden women's national under-18 ice hockey team: Emmy Alasalmi; Kristin Andersson; Matildah Andersson; Sara Besseling; Lina Bäcklin; Johanna Eidensten; Wilma Ekström; Maria Fuhrberg; Jessica Hjort; Rebecca Höglund; Anna Johansson; Anna Kjellbin; Sabina Küller; Cajsa Lillbäck; Amanda Lindberg; Linn Petersson; Malin Wong	Ice hockey	Girls' competition	22 Jan
Silver	Fredrik Bauer	Alpine skiing	Boys' super-G	14 Jan
Silver	Jonna Sundling	Cross-country skiing	Girls' sprint	19 Jan

== Alpine skiing ==
=== Boys ===
Athlete	Event	Final			
Athlete	Event	Run 1	Run 2	Total	Rank
Fredrik Bauer	Slalom	42.85	40.09	1:22.94	11
Fredrik Bauer	Giant slalom	DNF			
Fredrik Bauer	Super-G			1:04.57	Silver medal
Fredrik Bauer	Combined	1:04.08	38.58	1:42.66	6

=== Girls ===
Athlete	Event	Final			
Athlete	Event	Run 1	Run 2	Total	Rank
Magdalena Fjällström	Slalom	DNF			
Magdalena Fjällström	Giant slalom	57.14	59.45	1:56.59	5
Magdalena Fjällström	Super-G			1:06.23	6
Magdalena Fjällström	Combined	1:05.23	35:59	1:40.82	Gold medal

== Biathlon ==
=== Boys ===
Athlete	Event	Final		
Athlete	Event	Time	Misses	Rank
Niklas Forsberg	Sprint	22:19.4	5	29
Niklas Forsberg	Pursuit	32:18.3	7	19
Mattias Jonsson	Sprint	22:23.2	3	33
Mattias Jonsson	Pursuit	36:32.2	8	41

=== Girls ===
Athlete	Event	Final		
Athlete	Event	Time	Misses	Rank
Lotten Sjödén	Sprint	18:08.6	1	4
Lotten Sjödén	Pursuit	28:05.6	3	4
Linn Persson	Sprint	19:19.3	1	19
Linn Persson	Pursuit	32:00.7	3	19

=== Mixed ===
Athlete	Event	Final		
Athlete	Event	Time	Misses	Rank
Linn Persson; Lotten Sjödén; Mattias Jonsson; Niklas Forsberg	Mixed relay	1:16:02.9	3+12	6
Lotten Sjödén; Jonna Sundling; Niklas Forsberg; Marcus Ruus	Cross-Country-Biathlon Mixed Relay	1:06:07.9	0+9	6

== Cross-country skiing ==
=== Boys ===
Athlete	Event	Final	
Athlete	Event	Time	Rank
Marcus Ruus	10 km classical	31:02.7	10

=== Girls ===
Athlete	Event	Final	
Athlete	Event	Time	Rank
Jonna Sundling	5 km classical	15:45.9	9

=== Sprint ===
Athlete	Event	Qualifying		Quarterfinal		Semifinal		Final	
Athlete	Event	Total	Rank	Total	Rank	Total	Rank	Total	Rank
Marcus Ruus	Boys' sprint	1:46.9	13 Q	1:45.4	1 Q	1:45.7	2 Q	1:46.1	4
Jonna Sundling	Girls' sprint	1:55.57	2 Q	1:58.0	1 Q	1:58.4	1 Q	1:57.5	Silver medal

=== Mixed ===
Athlete	Event	Final		
Athlete	Event	Time	Misses	Rank
Lotten Sjödén; Jonna Sundling; Niklas Forsberg; Marcus Ruus	Cross-Country-Biathlon Mixed Relay	1:06:07.9	0+9	6

== Curling ==
=== Mixed team ===
Skip: Rasmus Wranå
Third: Amalia Rudström
Second: Jordan Wåhlin
Lead: Johanna Heldin

==== Round robin ====
Red Group	Skip	W	L
Sweden	Rasmus Wranå	6	1
Canada	Thomas Scoffin	5	2
Japan	Shingo Usui	4	3
Italy	Amos Mosaner	4	3
Great Britain	Duncan Menzies	3	4
Russia	Mikhail Vaskov	3	4
Austria	Mathias Genner	2	5
Germany	Daniel Rothballer	1	6

Draw 1

Sheet D	1	2	3	4	5	6	7	8	Final
Japan (Usui)	1	0	1	0	0	1	0	1	4
Sweden (Wranå)	0	1	0	3	0	0	1	0	5

Draw 2

Sheet C	1	2	3	4	5	6	7	8	Final
Sweden (Wranå)	4	0	0	0	0	1	0	1	6
Great Britain (Menzies)	0	1	1	0	0	0	2	0	4

Draw 3

Sheet B	1	2	3	4	5	6	7	8	Final
Sweden (Wranå)	1	0	1	0	1	1	0	1	5
Russia (Vaskov)	0	1	0	1	0	0	1	0	3

Draw 4

Sheet A	1	2	3	4	5	6	7	8	Final
Sweden (Wranå)	2	1	0	0	0	1	1	0	5
Italy (Mosander)	0	0	1	2	2	0	0	2	7

Draw 5

Sheet C	1	2	3	4	5	6	7	8	Final
Austria (Brettbacher)	0	2	3	0	0	0	0	X	5
Sweden (Wranå)	1	0	0	2	1	1	2	X	7

Draw 6

Sheet D	1	2	3	4	5	6	7	8	9	Final
Sweden (Wranå)	0	1	0	0	2	0	2	0	1	6
Canada (Scoffin)	1	0	1	0	0	1	0	2	0	5

Draw 7

Sheet B	1	2	3	4	5	6	7	8	Final
Germany (Rothballer)	1	1	0	1	0	1	0	X	4
Sweden (Wranå)	0	0	2	0	2	0	2	X	6

==== Quarterfinal ====
Sheet C	1	2	3	4	5	6	7	8	Final
Sweden (Wranå)	0	0	0	2	2	1	3	X	8
Norway (Skogvold)	0	0	0	0	0	0	0	X	0

==== Semifinal ====
Sheet A	1	2	3	4	5	6	7	8	Final
Switzerland (Brunner)	3	0	2	0	5	0	X	X	10
Sweden (Wranå)	0	1	0	2	0	1	X	X	4

==== Bronze medal game ====
Sheet B	1	2	3	4	5	6	7	8	Final
Canada (Scoffin)	1	0	2	0	1	1	0	1	6
Sweden (Wranå)	0	1	0	3	0	0	0	0	4

=== Mixed doubles ===
Athletes	Round of 32	Round of 16	Quarterfinal	Semifinal	Final	Rank
Camilla Schnabel (AUT); Jordan Wåhlin (SWE)	Ina Roll Backe (NOR); Wang Jin Bo (CHN); LOSS 7-8	DNQ				
Johanna Heldin (SWE); Luke Steele (NZL)	Angharad Ward (GBR); Markus Skogvold (NOR); WIN 9-8	Marina Verenich (RUS); Korey Dropkin (USA); LOSS 3-10	DNQ			
Amalia Rudström (SWE); Kevin Lehmann (GER)	Eunbi Kim (KOR); Martin Sesaker (NOR); LOSS 3-9	DNQ				
Kerli Zirk (EST); Rasmus Wranå (SWE)	Stine Haalien (NOR); Alexandr Korshunov (RUS); WIN 8-1	Duncan Menzies (GBR); Taylor Anderson (USA); LOSS 4-6	DNQ			

== Figure skating ==
=== Boys ===
Athlete	Event	Short program		Free skating		Total	
Athlete	Event	Points	Rank	Points	Rank	Points	Rank
John-Olof Hallman	Singles	40.50	11	79.62	13	120.12	13

=== Girls ===
Athlete	Event	Short program		Free skating		Total	
Athlete	Event	Points	Rank	Points	Rank	Points	Rank
Myrtel Saldéen Olofsson	Singles	33.57	14	58.97	14	92.54	14

=== Mixed ===
Athletes	Event	Boys'			Girls'			Ice Dance			Total	
Athletes	Event	Score	Rank	Points	Score	Rank	Points	Score	Rank	Points	Points	Rank
Team 5 Tino Olenius (FIN); Myrtel Saldeen Olofsson (SWE); Anna Yanovskaya/Sergey Mozgov (RUS)	Team Trophy	82.50	6	3	64.16	7	2	84.55	1	8	13	6

== Freestyle skiing ==
=== Boys ===
Athlete	Event	Qualifying		1/4 finals	Semifinals	Final
Athlete	Event	Time	Rank	Rank	Rank	Rank
Axel Frost	Ski cross	58.59	9	Cancelled		

=== Girls ===
Athlete	Event	Qualifying		1/4 finals	Semifinals	Final
Athlete	Event	Time	Rank	Rank	Rank	Rank
Malou Peterson	Ski cross	1:10.15	12	Cancelled		

== Ice hockey ==
=== Girls ===
#	Player	Club	Pos.
1	Jessica Hjort	(Sweden) Segeltorps IF	G
30	Sara Besseling	(Canada) Pursuit of Excellence	G
2	Cajsa Lillbäck	(Sweden) AIK IF	D
3	Wilma Ekström	(Sweden) Leksands IF	D
4	Rebecca Höglund	(Sweden) Segeltorps IF	D
5	Anna Kjellbin	(Sweden) Linköpings HC	D
6	Lina Bäcklin	(Sweden) Brynäs IF	D
21	Emmy Alasalmi	(Sweden) AIK IF	D
11	Matildah Andersson	(Sweden) Linköpings HC	F
12	Sabina Küller	(Sweden) AIK IF	F
14	Linn Petersson	(Sweden) Leksands IF	F
15	Malin Wong	(Sweden) Hällefors IK	F
16	Kristin Andersson	(Sweden) Munksund-Skuthamn	F
17	Anna Johansson	(Sweden) IF Malmö Redhawks	F
18	Amanda Lindberg	(Sweden) Leksands IF	F
19	Maria Fuhrberg	(Sweden) IF Sundsvall Hockey	F
22	Johanna Eidensten	(Sweden) Ormsta HC	F

==== Group stage ====
Legend
Advance to the Semifinals

Team	GP	W	OTW	OTL	L	GF	GA	Diff	PTS
Sweden	4	4	0	0	0	43	0	+43	12
Austria	4	3	0	0	1	22	6	+16	9
Germany	4	2	0	0	2	12	16	-4	6
Kazakhstan	4	1	0	0	3	3	28	-25	3
Slovakia	4	0	0	0	4	1	31	-30	0

January 13, 2012; 12:30	Germany	0 – 11 (0–3, 0–4, 0–4)	Sweden	Tyrolean Ice Arena; Attendance: 263

Game reference

Meike Krimphove
Goalies
Sara Besseling
Referee:
(United States) Ceci Morris
Linesmen:
(Finland) Taru Tanhua
(Denmark) Trine Viskum

0–1	0:56 – K. Andersson (M. Wong)
0–2	4:32 – K. Andersson (J. Eidensten, M. Wong)
0–3	12:41 – M. Andersson (L. Peterson, C. Lillback)
0–4	16:15 – K. Andersson (J. Eidensten, M. Wong)
0–5	21:56 – L. Peterson (C. Lillback, L. Backlin) (PP)
0–6	28:00 – L. Peterson (M. Andersson, A. Lindberg)
0–7	29:50 – L. Peterson (C. Lillback, L. Backlin)
0–8	32:40 – A. Lindberg (M. Andersson, C. Lillback)
0–9	35:21 – A. Lindberg (L. Backlin)
0–10	39:30 – E. Alasalmi (L. Peterson)
0–11	41:09 – J. Eidensten (A. Kjellbin)

6 min
Penalties
8 min
14
Shots
45

15 January; 15.45	Sweden	17 – 0 (2–0, 10–0, 5–0)	Kazakhstan	Tyrolean Ice Arena; Attendance: 553

Game reference

Jessica Wahlström Hjort
Goalies
Anastassiya Ogay
Referee:
(Slovakia) Zuzana Findurova
Linesmen:
(Czech Republic) Nikola Dvorakova
(Italy) Mirjam Gruber

0:30 - A. Lindberg (L. Peterson)	1-0
11:04 - W. Ekström (M. Fuhrberg)	2-0
15:35 - C. Lillback	3-0
15:58 - A. Johansson (S. Küller, M. Fuhrberg)	4-0
16:45 - L. Peterson (A. Lindberg)	5-0
17:00 - L. Peterson (L. Backlin, C. Lillback)	6-0
18:16 - M. Wong (K. Andersson)	7-0
19:50 - K. Andersson (A. Kjellbin)	8-0
22:23 - E. Alasalmi (K. Andersson) (PP)	9-0
23:48 - L. Peterson (M. Andersson)	10-0
26:07 - S. Küller	11-0
29:49 - M. Wong (E. Alasalmi)	12-0
31:58 - J. Eidensten (K. Andersson)	13-0
33:18 - L. Peterson (A. Lindberg)	14-0
37:28 - A. Kjellbin (S. Küller)	15-0
39:41 - A. Kjellbin (A. Johansson)	16-0
40:51 - J. Eidensten (E. Alasalmi)	17-0

4 min
Penalties
6 min
83
Shots
2

17 January; 09.00	Austria	0 – 3 (0–2, 0–0, 0–1)	Sweden	Tyrolean Ice Arena; Attendance: 432

Game reference

Paula Camilla Marchhart
Goalies
Jessica Wahlström Hjort
Referee:
(United States) Ceci Morris
Linesmen:
(Italy) Mirjam Gruber
(Denmark) Trine Viskum

0–1	12:31 - A. Lindberg (M. Wong, A. Johansson)
0–2	14:44 - A. Kjellbin (L. Peterson) (PP)
0–3	32:46 - K. Andersson (A. Kjellbin)

14 min
Penalties
35 min
11
Shots
54

18 January; 09.30	Sweden	12 – 0 (7–0, 4–0, 1–0)	Slovakia	Tyrolean Ice Arena; Attendance: 589

Sara Besseling
Goalies
Romana Kiapesova
Referee:
(Canada) Maghan Mallette
Linesmen:
(China) Hui Wang
(Denmark) Trine Viskum

3:22 - J. Eidensten (A. Johansson) (PP)	1–0
4:56 - A. Kjellbin (K. Andersson)	2–0
6:31 - M. Wong (R. Höglund, W. Ekström)	3–0
6:54 - M. Wong (R. Höglund)	4–0
7:08 - C. Lillbäck	5–0
7:50 - S. Küller (M. Andersson, C. Lillbäck)	6–0
9:20 - M. Wong (E. Alasalmi)	7–0
17:53 - K. Andersson (W. Ekström)	8–0
21:13 - C. Lillbäck (S. Küller, L. Backlin)	9–0
29:10 - M. Wong (R. Höglund)	10–0
29:51 - K. Andersson (M. Andersson, S. Küller)	11–0
33:37 - S. Küller (K. Andersson, A. Kjellbin)	12–0

4 min
Penalties
2 min
80
Shots
1

==== Semifinal ====
20 January; 12.00	Sweden	11 - 0 (2-0, 4-0, 5-0)	Kazakhstan	Tyrolean Ice Arena; Attendance: 713

Game reference

Jessica Wahlström Hjort
Goalies
Anastassiya Ogay
Referee:
(United States) Ceci Morris
Linesmen:
(Czech Republic) Nikola Dvorakova
(China) Hui Wang

0:13 - S. Küller (M. Andersson, C. Lillbäck)	1–0
7:05 - M. Fuhrberg (M. Andersson)	2–0
17:17 - A. Kjellbin (W. Ekström, A. Lindberg) (PP)	3–0
17:52 - M. Andersson (K. Andersson)	4–0
21:56 - M. Wong (E. Alasalmi, W. Ekström) (SH)	5–0
28:18 - S. Küller (E. Alasalmi, K. Andersson)	6–0
29:55 - M. Fuhrberg (J. Eidensten, A. Johansson	7–0
35:23 - J. Eidensten (M. Andersson, C. Lillbäck) (SH)	8–0
35:53 - L. Backlin (A. Johansson, J. Eidensten) (SH)	9–0
36:46 - A. Lindberg	10–0
41:24 - A Lindberg (A. Kjellbin)	11–0

10 min
Penalties
6 min
74
Shots
1

==== Final ====
22 January; 10.00	Sweden	3 - 0 (1-0, 1-0, 1-0)	Austria	Tyrolean Ice Arena; Attendance: 1,095

Game reference

Sara Besseling
Goalies
Paula Camilla Marchhart
Referee:
(Finland) Kaisa Ketonen
Linesmen:
(Finland) Taru Tanhua
(Denmark) Trine Viskum

13:20 - E. Alasalmi (A. Lindberg, M. Wong) (PP)	1–0
29:50 - L. Backlin (R. Höglund) (PP)	2–0
37:07 - E. Alasalmi (J. Eidensten)	3–0

4 min
Penalties
14 min
28
Shots
11

== Snowboarding ==
=== Boys ===
Athlete	Event	Qualifying			Semi final			Final		
Athlete	Event	Run 1	Run 2	Rank	Run 1	Run 2	Rank	Run 1	Run 2	Rank
Athlete	Event	Score	Score	Rank	Score	Score	Rank	Score	Score	Rank
Ludvig Ahlstedt Billtoft	Halfpipe	35.50	38.00	11	did not advance					26
Ludvig Ahlstedt Billtoft	Slopestyle	73.75	43.50	5				44.75	55.50	12

== Speed skating ==
=== Boys ===
Athlete	Event	Final	
Athlete	Event	Time	Rank
Nils van der Poel
Nils van der Poel	1500 m	2:02.84	7
Nils van der Poel	3000 m	4:15.53	5
Nils van der Poel	Mass start	7:14.66	9

== See also ==
- Sweden at the 2012 Summer Olympics
