= Ice hockey at the 2012 Winter Youth Olympics – Girls' team rosters =

These were the team rosters of the nations participating in the Girls' ice hockey tournament of the 2012 Winter Youth Olympics. Each team was permitted a roster of 15 skaters and 2 goaltenders.

== Austria ==
The following is the Austrian roster for the Girls' ice hockey tournament at the 2012 Winter Youth Olympics.

Head coach: Christian Yngve

No.	Pos.	Name	Height	Weight	Birthdate	Team
1	GK	Paula Camilla Marchhart	1.67 m (5 ft 6 in)	58 kg (128 lb)	25 July 1994 (aged 17)	(Austria) Wiener Eisloewen Verein
3	D	Luisa Steiner	1.70 m (5 ft 7 in)	55 kg (121 lb)	13 February 1994 (aged 17)	(Austria) Red Angels Innsbruck
5	F	Alexandra Gürtler	1.59 m (5 ft 3 in)	69 kg (152 lb)	21 November 1994 (aged 17)	(Austria) Tornados Ice Cats Linz
7	F	Julia Frick	1.62 m (5 ft 4 in)	53 kg (117 lb)	29 July 1994 (aged 17)	(Austria) EC Die Adler Kitzbuehel
9	D	Paulina Polczik	1.63 m (5 ft 4 in)	49 kg (108 lb)	20 August 1994 (aged 17)	(Austria) EC Die Adler Kitzbuehe
11	F	Victoria Hummel	1.60 m (5 ft 3 in)	61 kg (134 lb)	4 January 1994 (aged 18)	(Austria) EHV Sabres Wien
13	F	Tamara Grascher	1.68 m (5 ft 6 in)	26 kg (57 lb)	13 June 1994 (aged 17)	(Austria) DEC Salzburg Eagles
14	D	Martina Kneß	1.70 m (5 ft 7 in)	64 kg (141 lb)	6 May 1994 (aged 17)	(Austria) Neuberg Highlanders
15	F	Julia Willenshofer	1.61 m (5 ft 3 in)	53 kg (117 lb)	22 September 1994 (aged 17)	(Austria) Neuberg Highlanders
16	F	Anna Meixner	1.63 m (5 ft 4 in)	58 kg (128 lb)	16 June 1994 (aged 17)	(Austria) EK Zeller Eisbären Juniors
18	F	Anna Meixner	1.66 m (5 ft 5 in)	58 kg (128 lb)	21 August 1994 (aged 17)	(Austria) DEC Devils Graz
19	D	Noemi Prosenz	1.68 m (5 ft 6 in)	49 kg (108 lb)	19 September 1994 (aged 17)	(Austria) EHV Sabres Vienna
21	D	Nicole Arnberger	1.65 m (5 ft 5 in)	53 kg (117 lb)	27 September 1994 (aged 17)	(Austria) Wiener Eisloewen Verein
23	F	Anja List	1.70 m (5 ft 7 in)	67 kg (148 lb)	21 December 1994 (aged 17)	(Austria) DEC Salzburg Eagles
25	GK	Julia Pechmann	1.64 m (5 ft 5 in)	60 kg (130 lb)	10 March 1994 (aged 17)	(Austria) DEC Devils Graz
27	F	Anna Iberer	1.68 m (5 ft 6 in)	75 kg (165 lb)	19 March 1994 (aged 17)	(Austria) EHC Vienna Flyers
30	D	Anna Schmid	1.63 m (5 ft 4 in)	58 kg (128 lb)	30 October 1994 (aged 17)	(Austria) Red Angels Innsbruck

== Germany ==
The following is the German roster for the Girls' ice hockey tournament at the 2012 Winter Youth Olympics.

Head coach: Maritta Becker

No.	Pos.	Name	Height	Weight	Birthdate	Team
1	GK	Meike Krimphove	1.60 m (5 ft 3 in)	52 kg (115 lb)	23 March 1994 (aged 17)	(Germany) TSV Peißenberg
2	D	Lena Walz	1.63 m (5 ft 4 in)	56 kg (123 lb)	11 April 1994 (aged 17)	(Germany) ERV Schweinfurt
3	F	Johanna Winter	1.65 m (5 ft 5 in)	59 kg (130 lb)	9 November 1994 (aged 17)	(Germany) ECDC Memmingen
4	F	Theresia Hoppe	1.60 m (5 ft 3 in)	55 kg (121 lb)	17 September 1994 (aged 17)	(Germany) EHC Freiburg
5	F	Lucie Geelhaar	1.67 m (5 ft 6 in)	65 kg (143 lb)	13 November 1994 (aged 17)	(Germany) ERC Ingolstadt
6	F	Melanie Häringer	1.73 m (5 ft 8 in)	62 kg (137 lb)	21 March 1994 (aged 17)	(Germany) HC Landsberg
7	F	Simone Hase	1.52 m (5 ft 0 in)	46 kg (101 lb)	10 February 1994 (aged 17)	(Germany) ESV Königsbrunn
9	F	Valerie Offermann	1.64 m (5 ft 5 in)	68 kg (150 lb)	11 December 1994 (aged 17)	(Germany) Young Roosters Iserlohn
10	F	Pia Szawlowski	1.67 m (5 ft 6 in)	59 kg (130 lb)	2 November 1994 (aged 17)	(Germany) SC Langenhagen
11	F	Carolin Welsch	1.64 m (5 ft 5 in)	66 kg (146 lb)	3 August 1994 (aged 17)	(Germany) TSV Peißenberg
12	D	Anna Fiegert	1.73 m (5 ft 8 in)	69 kg (152 lb)	3 April 1994 (aged 17)	(Germany) EV Landshut
15	D	Katharina Oertel	1.66 m (5 ft 5 in)	61 kg (134 lb)	26 December 1994 (aged 17)	(Germany) ECDC Memmingen
18	F	Saskia Selzer	1.64 m (5 ft 5 in)	50 kg (110 lb)	1 November 1994 (aged 17)	(Germany) ECDC Memmingen
19	D	Theresa Fritz	1.65 m (5 ft 5 in)	52 kg (115 lb)	27 October 1994 (aged 17)	(Germany) EC Peiting
20	F	Nina Korff	1.65 m (5 ft 5 in)	52 kg (115 lb)	6 August 1994 (aged 17)	(Germany) Hannover Indians
21	F	Maylina Schrul	1.60 m (5 ft 3 in)	65 kg (143 lb)	16 September 1994 (aged 17)	(Germany) Hamburger EV
30	GK	Viola Hotter	1.65 m (5 ft 5 in)	46 kg (101 lb)	14 December 1994 (aged 17)	(Germany) ERC Lechbruck

== Kazakhstan ==
The following is the Kazakhstani roster for the Girls' ice hockey tournament at the 2012 Winter Youth Olympics.

Head coach: Mariya Topkayeva

No.	Pos.	Name	Height	Weight	Birthdate	Team
1	GK	Anastassiya Ogay	1.61 m (5 ft 3 in)	56 kg (123 lb)	4 June 1994 (aged 17)	(Kazakhstan) Ustinka Ust-Kamenogorsk
2	D	Zhanna Nurgaliyeva	1.63 m (5 ft 4 in)	60 kg (130 lb)	9 June 1994 (aged 17)	(Kazakhstan) SSHIOSD Almaty
3	D	Olessya Mironenko	1.60 m (5 ft 3 in)	58 kg (128 lb)	30 September 1994 (aged 17)	(Kazakhstan) Ustinka Ust-Kamenogorsk
4	F	Akzhan Oxykbayeva	1.60 m (5 ft 3 in)	52 kg (115 lb)	20 May 1994 (aged 17)	(Kazakhstan) SSHIOSD Almaty
5	D	Anastassiya Kryshkina	1.70 m (5 ft 7 in)	50 kg (110 lb)	30 April 1994 (aged 17)	(Kazakhstan) SSHIOSD Almaty
6	F	Zaure Nurgaliyeva	1.60 m (5 ft 3 in)	57 kg (126 lb)	22 February 1994 (aged 17)	(Kazakhstan) SSHIOSD Almaty
7	F	Anel Karimzhanova	1.68 m (5 ft 6 in)	60 kg (130 lb)	12 November 1994 (aged 17)	(Kazakhstan) SSHIOSD Almaty
8	F	Botagoz Khassenova	1.63 m (5 ft 4 in)	53 kg (117 lb)	19 April 1994 (aged 17)	(Kazakhstan) SSHIOSD Almaty
9	F	Kamila Gembitskaya	1.63 m (5 ft 4 in)	50 kg (110 lb)	29 March 1994 (aged 17)	(Kazakhstan) SSHIOSD Almaty
10	D	Nargiz Assimova	1.64 m (5 ft 5 in)	59 kg (130 lb)	17 November 1994 (aged 17)	(Kazakhstan) SSHIOSD Almaty
11	F	Meruyert Ryspek	1.62 m (5 ft 4 in)	56 kg (123 lb)	5 February 1994 (aged 17)	(Kazakhstan) Aisulu Almaty
12	F	Anastassiya Matussevich	1.62 m (5 ft 4 in)	52 kg (115 lb)	8 August 1994 (aged 17)	(Kazakhstan) SSHIOSD Almaty
13	D	Assem Tuleubayeva	1.70 m (5 ft 7 in)	58 kg (128 lb)	18 December 1994 (aged 17)	(Kazakhstan) Ustinka Ust-Kamenogorsk
14	F	Saltanat Urpekbayeva	1.62 m (5 ft 4 in)	63 kg (139 lb)	23 January 1994 (aged 17)	(Kazakhstan) Ustinka Ust-Kamenogorsk
15	F	Olga Lobova	1.74 m (5 ft 9 in)	55 kg (121 lb)	27 July 1994 (aged 17)	(Kazakhstan) SSHIOSD Almaty
16	F	Malika Bulembayeva	1.70 m (5 ft 7 in)	58 kg (128 lb)	20 January 1994 (aged 17)	(Kazakhstan) SSHIOSD Almaty
20	GK	Raissa Minakova	1.59 m (5 ft 3 in)	70 kg (150 lb)	25 July 1994 (aged 17)	(Kazakhstan) SSHIOSD Almaty

== Slovakia ==
The following is the Slovak roster for the Girls' ice hockey tournament at the 2012 Winter Youth Olympics.

Head coach: Stanislav Kubuš

No.	Pos.	Name	Height	Weight	Birthdate	Team
2	GK	Nikola Kaliská	1.76 m (5 ft 9 in)	60 kg (130 lb)	5 December 1994 (aged 17)	(Slovakia) ZHK Iskra Banska Bystrica
6	D	Nikola Řezánková	1.69 m (5 ft 7 in)	54 kg (119 lb)	6 August 1994 (aged 17)	(Slovakia) ZHK Iskra Banska Bystrica
10	F	Viktória Frankovičová	1.72 m (5 ft 8 in)	57 kg (126 lb)	7 October 1994 (aged 17)	(Slovakia) HC OSY Spisska Nova Ves
11	D	Katarína Luptáková	1.69 m (5 ft 7 in)	55 kg (121 lb)	16 August 1994 (aged 17)	(Slovakia) HK Brezno
12	F	Martina Matisková	1.71 m (5 ft 7 in)	52 kg (115 lb)	15 June 1994 (aged 17)	(Slovakia) ZHK 2000 Sarisanka Presov
15	F	Jana Kubaliková	1.68 m (5 ft 6 in)	55 kg (121 lb)	10 December 1994 (aged 17)	(Slovakia) HC Slovan Bratislava
16	F	Mária Rajtárová	1.74 m (5 ft 9 in)	56 kg (123 lb)	20 April 1994 (aged 17)	(Slovakia) HK Poprad
17	F	Dominika Takáčová	1.73 m (5 ft 8 in)	53 kg (117 lb)	19 February 1994 (aged 17)	(Slovakia) HK Martin
18	F	Ľubica Štofanková	1.67 m (5 ft 6 in)	51 kg (112 lb)	28 June 1994 (aged 17)	(Slovakia) ZHK Iskra Banska Bystrica
19	F	Zuzana Kubaliková	1.68 m (5 ft 6 in)	54 kg (119 lb)	10 December 1994 (aged 17)	(Slovakia) HC Slovan Bratislava
21	D	Ľubica Levčíková	1.72 m (5 ft 8 in)	57 kg (126 lb)	11 January 1994 (aged 18)	(Slovakia) HK Martin
22	D	Diana Pápešová	1.67 m (5 ft 6 in)	52 kg (115 lb)	22 July 1994 (aged 17)	(Slovakia) ZHKM Zvolen
23	D	Miroslava Vaváková	1.70 m (5 ft 7 in)	51 kg (112 lb)	12 November 1994 (aged 17)	(Slovakia) HK Martin
24	F	Silvia Vojtková	1.70 m (5 ft 7 in)	52 kg (115 lb)	20 August 1994 (aged 17)	(Slovakia) HK Martin
26	F	Mária Hudecová	1.70 m (5 ft 7 in)	60 kg (130 lb)	26 February 1994 (aged 17)	(Slovakia) ZHKM Zvolen
29	F	Júlia Švagerková	1.71 m (5 ft 7 in)	53 kg (117 lb)	27 August 1994 (aged 17)	(Slovakia) HK Poprad
30	GK	Romana Kiapešová	1.74 m (5 ft 9 in)	57 kg (126 lb)	26 September 1994 (aged 17)	(Slovakia) HC OSY Spisska Nova Ves

== Sweden ==
The following is the Sweden roster for the Girls' ice hockey tournament at the 2012 Winter Youth Olympics.

Head coach: Henrik Cedergren

No.	Pos.	Name	Height	Weight	Birthdate	Team
1	GK	Jessica Wahlström Hjorth	1.66 m (5 ft 5 in)	62 kg (137 lb)	4 November 1994 (aged 17)	(Sweden) Segeltorps IF
2	D	Cajsa Lillbäck	1.55 m (5 ft 1 in)	58 kg (128 lb)	13 July 1994 (aged 17)	(Sweden) AIK Hockey Dam
3	D	Wilma Ekström	1.71 m (5 ft 7 in)	68 kg (150 lb)	20 October 1994 (aged 17)	(Sweden) Leksands IF Dam
4	D	Rebecca Höglund	1.71 m (5 ft 7 in)	67 kg (148 lb)	23 December 1994 (aged 17)	(Sweden) Segeltorps IF
5	D	Anna Kjellbin	1.69 m (5 ft 7 in)	68 kg (150 lb)	16 March 1994 (aged 17)	(Sweden) Linköping HC Dam
6	D	Lina Bäcklin	1.69 m (5 ft 7 in)	67 kg (148 lb)	3 October 1994 (aged 17)	(Sweden) Brynäs IF Dam
11	F	Matildah Andersson	1.60 m (5 ft 3 in)	60 kg (130 lb)	20 March 1994 (aged 17)	(Sweden) Linköping HC Dam
12	F	Sabina Küller	1.76 m (5 ft 9 in)	70 kg (150 lb)	22 September 1994 (aged 17)	(Sweden) AIK Hockey Dam
14	F	Linn Peterson	1.74 m (5 ft 9 in)	71 kg (157 lb)	8 January 1994 (aged 18)	(Sweden) Leksands IF Dam
15	F	Malin Wong	1.65 m (5 ft 5 in)	60 kg (130 lb)	3 September 1994 (aged 17)	(Sweden) Hällefors IK
16	F	Kristin Andersson	1.64 m (5 ft 5 in)	64 kg (141 lb)	11 March 1994 (aged 17)	(Sweden) Munksund Skuthamn SK
17	D	Anna Johansson	1.60 m (5 ft 3 in)	59 kg (130 lb)	4 August 1994 (aged 17)	(Sweden) Malmö Redhawks
18	F	Amanda Lindberg	1.69 m (5 ft 7 in)	70 kg (150 lb)	3 February 1994 (aged 17)	(Sweden) Leksands IF Dam
19	F	Maria Fuhrberg	1.71 m (5 ft 7 in)	68 kg (150 lb)	11 April 1994 (aged 17)	(Sweden) IF Sundsvall Hockey
21	D	Emmy Alasalmi	1.62 m (5 ft 4 in)	65 kg (143 lb)	17 January 1994 (aged 17)	(Sweden) AIK Hockey Dam
22	F	Johanna Eidensten	1.70 m (5 ft 7 in)	70 kg (150 lb)	18 January 1994 (aged 17)	(Sweden) Ormsta HC
30	GK	Sara Besseling	1.64 m (5 ft 5 in)	68 kg (150 lb)	1 April 1994 (aged 17)	(Canada) Pursuit of Excellence Hockey Academy
