= 2019–20 Euro Hockey Tour (women) =

Tournament details
- Host countries: Finland; Russia; Germany; Sweden
- Venues: 8 (in 7 host cities)
- Dates: 4 Nations in Vierumäki; 18–24 August 2019; 5 Nations in Dmitrov; 6–10 November 2019; 4 Nations in Füssen; 8–12 December 2019; 6 Nations in Sweden; 5–8 February 2020

Tournament statistics
- Scoring leader(s): 4 Nations in Vierumäki (Finland) Petra Nieminen (7); 5 Nations in Dmitrov (Czech Republic) Alena Mills (6); 4 Nations in Füssen (Switzerland) Lara Stalder (6); 6 Nations in Sweden (Finland) Petra Nieminen (8)

The 2019–20 Euro Hockey Tour was the second season of the six-team Euro Hockey Tour (EHT) format, first implemented in the 2018–19 season. It was played over four tournaments: a four nation tournament in Finland, a five nation tournament in Russia, a four nation tournament in Germany, and concluded with a six nation tournament in Sweden. The women's national teams from the Czech Republic, Finland, Germany, Japan, Russia, Sweden, and Switzerland participated in at least one tournament; Finland was the only national team to participate in all four tournaments.

The boycott staged by the players of the Swedish women's national team (Damkronorna) against the Swedish Ice Hockey Association (SIF) concerning, among other issues, player treatment and team conditions, necessitated adjustments in two of the EHT tournaments in the 2019–20 season. The Swedish players announced the boycott on 14 August 2019, days before they were scheduled to compete in the first Euro Hockey Tour tournament of the season, and quick reshuffling of the tournament was required. The boycott was ended on 14 October 2019, when the players' union and the SIF agreed to new terms and conditions for the national team, principally concerning compensation for lost earnings while participating in national team training and competition and a guarantee of full insurance coverage for any injuries sustained while playing with Damkronorna, among others. The team's much delayed training camp was held during 4–8 November 2019 and the conflicting dates caused the Swedes to cancel their participation in the EHT tournament in Dmitrov held during 6–10 November 2019. The Swedish national team appeared in the remaining two tournaments as scheduled.

== Four Nations Tournament in Vierumäki ==
The 2019–20 season began with a Euro Hockey Tour tournament in Vierumäki (Finnish: Euro Hockey Tour -turnaus, Vierumäki), a four nations tournament (also stylized as "4 nations tournament") featuring the national teams from the Czech Republic, Finland, Japan, and Russia. It was principally played in Vierumäki, Finland, with single matches being played in Kerava, and Mikkeli, during 18–24 August 2019. Sweden cancelled its participation in the tournament due to the ongoing boycott of the national team players. Finland swept the tournament to claim a decisive victory for the host nation.

=== Standings ===
| Pos | Team | Pld | W | L | GF | GA | GD | Pts |
|---|---|---|---|---|---|---|---|---|
| 1 | Finland | 4 | 4 | 0 | 19 | 5 | +14 | 12 |
| 2 | Russia | 4 | 2 | 2 | 10 | 8 | +2 | 6 |
| 3 | Japan | 4 | 2 | 2 | 9 | 8 | +1 | 6 |
| 4 | Czech Republic | 4 | 0 | 4 | 6 | 23 | −17 | 0 |

=== Results ===
All times local, UTC+2.

| 20 August 2019; 15:00 | Russia | 2 – 0 (0–0, 1–0, 1–0) | Japan | Vierumäki 2, Vierumäki; Attendance: 20 |

| Valeria Merkusheva | Goalies | Nana Fujimoto | Referees: Kaisa Ketonen; Anniina Nurmi; Linesmen: Elisa Vaittinen; Johanna Oksanen |
| Kadirova (Dobrodeyeva) – 33:22 / 1–0; Shokhina (Shtaryova, Bratisheva) – 46:07 / 2–0 | | | Referees: Kaisa Ketonen; Anniina Nurmi; Linesmen: Elisa Vaittinen; Johanna Oksanen |
| 8 min | Penalties | 8 min | Referees: Kaisa Ketonen; Anniina Nurmi; Linesmen: Elisa Vaittinen; Johanna Oksanen |
| 36 | Shots | 18 | Referees: Kaisa Ketonen; Anniina Nurmi; Linesmen: Elisa Vaittinen; Johanna Oksanen |

| 20 August 2019; 19:00 | Czech Republic | 2 – 9 (1–4, 1–4, 0–1) | Finland | Vierumäki 2, Vierumäki; Attendance: 40 |

Blanka Škodová
Goalies
Eveliina Suonpää
Referees:
Miyuki Nakayama
Henna Åberg
Linesmen:
Helinä Anttila
Jenni Jaatinen

| | 0–1 | 00:19 – Karvinen (Tulus, Nieminen) |
| | 0–2 | 02:44 – Nieminen (Savolainen) |
| | 0–3 | 06:25 – Liikala (Nilsson, Valkama) |
| | 0–4 | 09:37 – Hiirikoski (Tulus) |
| Přibylová – 11:31 | 1–4 |
| | 1–5 | 21:06 – Kuoppala (Savolainen, Laitinen) (PP) |
| | 1–6 | 21:22 – Hakala (Niskanen, Holopainen) |
| Křížová (Vanišová) – 37:51 | 2–6 |
| | 2–7 | 39:06 – Nieminen (Tulus, Hiirikoski) (PP) |
| | 2–8 | 39:59 – Liikala (Karppinen) |
| | 2–9 | 58:24 – Rantala (Vainikka) |

8 min
Penalties
24 min
20
Shots
36

| 21 August 2019; 15:00 | Czech Republic | 0 – 2 (0–1, 0–0, 0–1) | Japan | Vierumäki 2, Vierumäki; Attendance: 20 |

| Kateřina Zechovská | Goalies | Nana Fujimoto | Referees: Henna Åberg; Sini Kauhanen; Linesmen: Julia Haiminen; Johanna Oksanen |
| 0–1 / 18:06 – Miura (Taka, Kubo); 0–2 / 59:49 – Toko (Ak. Shiga) (SH, EN) | | | Referees: Henna Åberg; Sini Kauhanen; Linesmen: Julia Haiminen; Johanna Oksanen |
| 10 min | Penalties | 6 min | Referees: Henna Åberg; Sini Kauhanen; Linesmen: Julia Haiminen; Johanna Oksanen |
| 27 | Shots | 28 | Referees: Henna Åberg; Sini Kauhanen; Linesmen: Julia Haiminen; Johanna Oksanen |

| 21 August 2019; 18:30 | Finland | 3 – 0 (1–0, 0–0, 2–0) | Russia | Kalevankankaan jäähalli, Mikkeli; Attendance: 613 |

Meeri Räisänen
Goalies
Nadezhda Morozova
Referees:
Johanna Tauriainen
Anniina Nurmi
Linesmen:
Jenna Puhakka
Jenni Jaatinen

| Nieminen (Karvinen, Hiirikoski) – 11:33 | 1–0 |
| Hakala (Lindstedt) – 41:54 | 2–0 |
| Savolainen (Laitinen, Kuoppala) (PP) – 43:10 | 3–0 |

4 min
Penalties
14 min
30
Shots
17

| 23 August 2019; 15:00 | Japan | 1 – 3 (0–1, 1–0, 0–2) | Finland | Vierumäki 2, Vierumäki; Attendance: 70 |

Nana Fujimoto
Goalies
Meeri Räisänen
Referees:
Johanna Tauriainen
Kasia Ketonen
Linesmen:
Linnea Sainio
Helinä Anttila

| | 0–1 | 02:18 – Nilsson (Nylund, Karjalainen) (DP) |
| Kubo (Yamashita, Toko) (PP) – 38:17 | 1–1 |
| | 1–2 | 43:05 – Vainikka (Hiirikoski) |
| | 1–3 | 53:17 – Karvinen (Nieminen) (SH) |

14 min
Penalties
8 min
21
Shots
35

| 23 August 2019; 15:15 | Russia | 6 – 1 (2–1, 1–0, 3–0) | Czech Republic | Vierumäen jäähalli, Vierumäki; Attendance: 20 |

Nadezhda Morozova
Goalies
Kateřina Zechovská
Referees:
Miyuki Nakayama
Henna-Maria Koivuluoma
Linesmen:
Julia Halme
Aino Härkönen

| Dobrodeyeva (Mezentseva) – 10:09 | 1–0 |
| Bratisheva (Shokhina, Provorova) – 11:36 | 2–0 |
| | 2–1 | 18:24 – Kovářová (Pejzlová, Vanišová) |
| Pirogova (Shokhina) – 28:17 | 3–1 |
| Sosina (Dyupina) – 45:25 | 4–1 |
| Savonina (Kulishova) – 51:16 | 5–1 |
| Bratisheva (Shtaryova, Pirogova) – 55:18 | 6–1 |

10 min
Penalties
6 min
27
Shots
14

| 24 August 2019; 10:30 | Japan | 6 – 3 (2–0, 0–1, 4–2) | Czech Republic | Vierumäki 2, Vierumäki; Attendance: 20 |

Mai Kondo
Goalies
Kateřina Zechovská
Blanka Škodová
Referees:
Miyuki Nakayama
Johanna Tauriainen
Linesmen:
Linnea Sainio
Salla-Maaria Raitala

| Ak. Shiga (Fujimoto) – 01:39 | 1–0 |
| Miura (Kubo) – 08:53 | 2–0 |
| | 2–1 | 25:01 – Vanišová (Pejzlová, Kovářová) (PP) |
| | 2–2 | 41:29 – Lédlová (Křížová) |
| Toko – 42:27 | 3–2 |
| K. Suzuki – 43:27 | 4–2 |
| Kubo – 43:57 | 5–2 |
| | 5–3 | 49:01 – Lédlová (Patočková) |
| Ak. Shiga (Miura) (EN) – 59:59 | 6–3 |

10 min
Penalties
10 min
29
Shots
24

| 24 August 2019; 13:00 | Finland | 4 – 2 (2–1, 1–1, 1–0) | Russia | Keravan jäähalli, Kerava; Attendance: 375 |

Eveliina Suonpää
Goalies
Valeria Merkusheva
Referees:
Anniina Nurmi
Henna-Maria Koivuluoma
Linesmen:
Julia Halme
Jenni Heikkinen

| | 0–1 | 02:03 – Sosina (PP) |
| Tulus (Savolainen, Hiirikoski) – 03:06 | 1–1 |
| Nieminen (Tulus, Karvinen) (PP) – 14:27 | 2–1 |
| Nieminen (Hiirikoski, Karvinen) (PP) – 23:55 | 3–1 |
| | 3–2 | 27:21 – Shibanova (Sosina) |
| Hiirikoski (Tulus) (PP) – 50:54 | 4–2 |

12 min
Penalties
10 min
22
Shots
30

Top Scorers

1. (Finland) Petra Nieminen, 7 points (5+2)
2. (Finland) Jenni Hiirikoski, 7 points (2+5)
3. (Finland) Noora Tulus, 6 points (1+5)
4. (Finland) Michelle Karvinen, 5 points (2+3)
5. (Japan) Hanae Kubo, 4 points (2+2)

Source: Finnish Ice Hockey Association

Top Goaltenders

1. (Finland) Meeri Räisänen, 97.4% save percentage
2. (Japan) Nana Fujimoto, 94.9% save percentage
3. (Finland) Eveliina Suonpää, 92.0% save percentage
4. (Russia) Nadezhda Morozova, 90.9% save percentage
5. (Russia) Valeria Merkusheva, 90.0% save percentage

Source: Finnish Ice Hockey Association

=== Individual awards ===
- Best Goaltender: (Finland) Meeri Räisänen
- Best Defender: (Finland) Jenni Hiirikoski
- Best Forward: (Russia) Olga Sosina

Source: IIHF

== Five Nations Tournament in Dmitrov ==
The Five Nations Tournament in Dmitrov (Russian: Турнир пяти наций; also stylized as "5 Nations Tournament") was played during 6–10 November 2019 at Dmitrov Arena (Russian: Арена Дмитров) in Dmitrov, Russia. The tournament was dedicated to the 25th anniversary of women's ice hockey in Russia. The women's national teams from the Czech Republic, Finland, Germany, Russia, and Switzerland participated; the Swedish national team declined to join the tournament as they had ended their boycott only several weeks prior and were in the midst of training camp at the time of the tournament. The Czech Republic were victorious in all of their matches and won the tournament.

=== Standings ===
| Pos | Team | Pld | W | OTW | OTL | L | GF | GA | GD | Pts |
|---|---|---|---|---|---|---|---|---|---|---|
| 1 | Czech Republic | 4 | 4 | 0 | 0 | 0 | 16 | 2 | +14 | 12 |
| 2 | Russia | 4 | 2 | 1 | 0 | 1 | 14 | 7 | +7 | 8 |
| 3 | Finland | 4 | 2 | 0 | 1 | 1 | 14 | 7 | +7 | 7 |
| 4 | Switzerland | 4 | 0 | 1 | 0 | 3 | 5 | 20 | −15 | 2 |
| 5 | Germany | 4 | 0 | 0 | 1 | 3 | 4 | 17 | −13 | 1 |

=== Results ===
All times local, UTC+3

| 6 November 2019; 14:00 | Czech Republic | 8 – 0 (1–0, 5–0, 2–0) | Switzerland | Dmitrov Arena, Dmitrov |

Kateřina Zechovská
Goalies
Andrea Brändli

| Pejšová (Křížová, Hymlárová) – 04:49 | 1–0 |
| Kaltounková (Seroiszková) – 23:16 | 2–0 |
| Kaltounková (Hanzlíková, Mazanková) – 30:00 | 3–0 |
| Křížová (Škrdlová) – 30:38 | 4–0 |
| Lédlová (Mills, Hymlárová) (PP2) – 37:57 | 5–0 |
| Přibylová (Mrázová, Vanišová) (PP1) – 38:14 | 6–0 |
| Mlýnková (Hymlárová) – 51:12 | 7–0 |
| Kaltounková (Škrdlová) – 54:19 | 8–0 |

2 min
Penalties
10 min
51
Shots
15

| 6 November 2019; 18:00 | Russia | 3 – 2 (1–0, 0–1, 1–1) (OT: 0–0) (SO: 1–0) | Finland | Dmitrov Arena, Dmitrov; Attendance: 845 |

Nadezhda Morozova
Goalies
Meeri Räisänen

| Pavlova (Falyakhova) – 08:05 | 1–0 |
| | 1–1 | 25:25 – Savolainen (Tuominen, Kuoppala) (PP1) |
| Vafina (Sosina) – 48:45 | 2–1 |
| | 2–2 | 59:29 – Lindstedt (Nieminen, Karvinen) (PP1, EA) |

Pavlova (miss)
Sosina
Pirogova (miss)
Kadirova (miss)
Shootout
(miss) Nieminen
(miss) Savolainen
(miss) Tuominen
(miss) Kuoppala
(miss) Tapani
10 min
Penalties
12 min
21
Shots
25

| 7 November 2019; 14:00 | Finland | 1 – 2 (0–1, 0–0, 1–1) | Czech Republic | Dmitrov Arena, Dmitrov; Attendance: 120 |

Noora Räty
Goalies
Klára Peslarová

| | 0–1 | 10:01 – Mills (Mlýnková) (PP1) |
| | 0–2 | 48:24 – Mrázová |
| Tuominen (Nieminen) (EA) – 57:45 | 1–2 |

10 min
Penalties
6 min
30
Shots
26

| 7 November 2019; 18:00 | Germany | 0 – 5 (0–0, 0–2, 0–3) | Russia | Dmitrov Arena, Dmitrov; Attendance: 1,010 |

Jennifer Harß
Goalies
Valeria Merkusheva

| 0–1 | 23:05 – Lebedeva (Sosina) |
| 0–2 | 27:06 – Provorova (Kanayeva, Pirogova) (PP1) |
| 0–3 | 47:07 – Dobrodeyeva (Pavlova) |
| 0–4 | 51:24 – Pavlova (Orlova, Ganeyeva) |
| 0–5 | 58:09 – Shtaryova (Pirogova, Provorova) (PP1) |

10 min
Penalties
6 min
14
Shots
38

| 8 November 2019; 14:00 | Switzerland | 1 – 4 {0–2, 1–1, 0–1) | Finland | Dmitrov Arena, Dmitrov; Attendance: 78 |

Andrea Brändli
Goalies
Meeri Räisänen

| | 0–1 | 05:49 – Liikala (Laitinen, Tuominen) |
| | 0–2 | 10:56 – Niskanen (Savolainen, Tuominen) (PP1) |
| Zimmermann (Stalder, Leemann) – 21:25 | 1–2 |
| | 1–3 | 35:28 – Lindstedt (PP1) |
| | 1–4 | 44:02 – Holopainen (SH1) |

18 min
Penalties
12 min
17
Shots
43

| 8 November 2019; 18:00 | Czech Republic | 2 – 1 (0–0, 1–1, 1–0) | Germany | Dmitrov Arena, Dmitrov; Attendance: 310 |

Kateřina Zechovská
Goalies
Jennifer Harß

| | 0–1 | 29:47 – Weidenfelder (Delarbre) |
| Mlýnková (Mills, Horálková) (PP1) – 35:09 | 1–1 |
| Lédlová (Hymlárová, Mlýnková) (PP1) – 47:08 | 2–1 |

12 min
Penalties
14 min
35
Shots
12

| 9 November 2019; 14:00 | Finland | 7 – 1; 3—0 / 2—1 / 2—0 | Germany | Dmitrov Arena, Dmitrov |

Noora Räty
Goalies
Jule Flötgen

| Nilsson (Vainikka) – 03:54 | 1—0 |
| Tuominen (Nilsson) – 06:03 | 2—0 |
| Hakala (Karppinen) – 08:19 | 3—0 |
| Rantala (Karjalainen, Nilsson) – 24:56 | 4—0 |
| | 4—1 | 26:30 – Eisenschmid (Lanzl) |
| Nieminen (Tapani, Tulus) (PP1) – 31:34 | 5—1 |
| Tapani (Tuominen, Nieminen) – 43:20 | 6—1 |
| Tapani (Hiirikoski, Tulus) (PP1) – 47:54 | 7—1 |

4 min
Penalties
6 min
34
Shots
12

| 9 November 2019; 18:00 | Russia | 6 – 1; 1–0 / 4–0 / 1–1 | Switzerland | Dmitrov Arena, Dmitrov; Attendance: 1,572 |

Anna Prugova
Goalies
Saskia Maurer

| Shokhina (Pirogova, Shtaryova) – 10:05 | 1—0 |
| Provorova (Pirogova, Shokhina) (PP1) – 27:40 | 2—0 |
| Shokhina (Pirogova, Shtaryova) – 32:21 | 3—0 |
| Provorova (Shtaryova, Shokhina) (PP1) – 34:33 | 4—0 |
| Kanayeva (Pirogova, Provorova) – 37:35 | 5—0 |
| Kadirova – 48:46 | 6—0 |
| | 6—1 | 57:06 – Raselli (Ryhner, Enzler) (PP1) |

6 min
Penalties
8 min
18
Shots
31

| 10 November 2019; 14:00 | Germany | 2 – 3 SO (0-1, 0-0, 2-1) (OT: 0-0) {SO: 0-1) | Switzerland | Dmitrov Arena, Dmitrov; Attendance: 105 |

Jennifer Harß
Goalies
Andrea Brändli

| | 0—1 | 19:26 – Stalder (Christen, Enzler) (PP1) |
| | 0—2 | 42:32 – Ryhner (Enzler) |
| Delarbre (SH1) – 52:12 | 1—2 |
| Nix (PP1) – 57:32 | 2—2 |

Lanzl (miss)
Delarbre
Spielberger (miss)
Eisenschmid
Nix (miss)
Delarbre (miss)
Shootout
(miss) Raselli
(miss) Leemann
Stalder
(miss) Enzler
Zimmermann
Stalder
10 min
Penalties
10 min
32
Shots
17

| 10 November 2019; 18:00 | Czech Republic | 4 – 0 (2-0, 2-0, 0-0) | Russia | Dmitrov Arena; Attendance: 1,768 |

Klára Peslarová
Goalies
Nadezhda Morozova
Valeria Merkusheva

| Vanišová (Lédlová) – 1:35 | 1—0 |
| Mills (Hymlárová, Mlýnková) – 19:50 | 2—0 |
| Hymlárová (Mills) (PP1) – 33:21 | 3—0 |
| Mills (Hymlárová, Horálková) (PP1) – 37:15 | 4—0 |

12 min
Penalties
8 min
21
Shots
41

Top Scorers

1. (Czech Republic) Alena Mills, 6 points (3+3)
2. (Finland) Minnamari Tuominen, 6 points (2+4)
3. (Czech Republic) Klára Hymlárová, 6 points (1+5)
4. (Russia) Nina Pirogova, 6 points (0+6)
5. (Russia) Yelena Provorova, 5 points (3+2)

Source: Finnish Ice Hockey Association

=== Individual awards ===
Best Players of the Tournament

- Best Goaltender: (Czech Republic) Klára Peslarová
- Best Skater(s): (Czech Republic) Alena Mills, (Russia) Olga Sosina

Source: Czech Ice Hockey Association

== Four Nations Tournament in Füssen ==
The Four Nations Tournament in Füssen (German: 4 Nationen-Turnier — Füssen; also stylized as "4 Nations Tournament") was held 8–12 December 2019 at the Bundesleistungszentrum (BLZ-Arena) in Füssen, Germany. The Swiss team had an impressive showing and were surprise champions of the tournament.

=== Standings ===
| Pos | Team | Pld | W | L | GF | GA | GD | Pts |
|---|---|---|---|---|---|---|---|---|
| 1 | Switzerland | 3 | 3 | 0 | 14 | 8 | +6 | 6 |
| 2 | Finland | 3 | 1 | 2 | 9 | 10 | −1 | 4 |
| 3 | Germany | 3 | 1 | 2 | 8 | 11 | −3 | 4 |
| 4 | Sweden | 3 | 1 | 2 | 6 | 8 | −2 | 4 |

=== Results ===
| 12 December 2019; 16:00 UTC+1 | Germany | 3–2; 1–1 / 2–1 / 0–0 | Sweden | BLZ Füssen; Attendance: 95 |

Game reference

Jennifer Harß
Goalies
Lovisa Selander
Referee:
Stefan Vogl
Linesmen:
Melanie Bauer
Julia Männlein

| Kubiczek (Gleißner, Nix) | 1–0 |
| | 1—1 | Nylén-Persson (Engström) |
| Spielberger (Kluge, Botthof) | 2—1 |
| Bartsch (Kluge, Sabus) | 3—1 |
| | 3—2 | Lundin (Bouveng, Nylén-Persson) |

2 min
Penalties
4 min

| 12 December 2019; 19:30 UTC+1 | Finland | 4–5; 2—1 / 1—2 / 1—1 / 0—0 / 0—1 | Switzerland | BLZ Füssen; Attendance: 45 |

Game reference

Meeri Räisänen
Goalies
Saskia Maurer

| Tapani | 1—0 |
| Tulus (Nieminen) | 2—0 |
| | 2—1 | Stalder (Ryhner) |
| Tulus (Nieminen, Hiirikoski) | 3—1 |
| | 3—2 | Muller (Enzler) |
| | 3—3 | Christen |
| | 3—4 | Enzler (Rüegg) |
| Tapani (Tulus) | 4—4 |

Shootout

Shootout goals scored by Lara Stalder (SUI) and Alina Muller (SUI)
2 min
Penalties
8 min
36
Shots
18

| 13 December 2019; 15:00 UTC+1 | Sweden | 4–1; 0—0 / 2—1 / 2—0 | Finland | BLZ Füssen; Attendance: 64 |

Game reference

Sara Grahn
Goalies
Meeri Räisänen
Jenna Silvonen

| Muren | 1—0 |
| | 1—1 | Vainikka (Tuominen, Nuutinen) |
| Löwenhielm (Johansson) | 2—1 |
| Udén Johansson (Rask) | 3—1 |
| Kuller (Östensson, Fällman) | 4—1 |

4 min
Penalties
4 min
44
Shots
21

| 13 December 2019; 18:30 UTC+1 | Germany | 4–5; 2—1 / 0—2 / 2—1 / 0—1 | Switzerland | BLZ Füssen |

Game reference

Sandra Abstreiter
Goalies
Ramona Forrer

| Gleissner (Karpf) | 1—0 |
| Karpf (Lanzl, Eisenschmid) | 2—0 |
| | 2—1 | Zimmermann (Lutz) |
| | 2—2 | Rüegg (Enzler, Sigrist) |
| | 2—3 | Stalder (Muller) |
| Lanzl (Kluge, Klinger) | 3—3 |
| Eisenschmid (Delarbre) | 4—3 |
| | 4—4 | Zimmermann (Raselli, Vallario) |
| | 4—5 | Stalder (Muller) |

8 min
Penalties
8 min

| 14 December 2019; 14:00 UTC+1 | Switzerland | 4–0; 2—0 / 1—0 / 1—0 | Sweden | BLZ Füssen |

Game reference

Saskia Maurer
Goalies
Sara Grahn
Lovisa Selander

| Stalder | 1—0 |
| Rüegg (Raselli, Enzler) | 2—0 |
| Muller (Ryhner, Stalder) | 3—0 |
| Muller (Maurer) | 4—0 |

10 min
Penalties
10 min

| 14 December 2019; 17:30 UTC+1 | Germany | 2–3 | Finland | BLZ Füssen; Attendance: 120 |

Game reference

Jennifer Harß
Goalies
Jenna Silvonen

| | 0—1 | Lindstedt (Hiirikoski, Niminen) |
| | 0—2 | Lindstedt (Tapani, Nieminen) |
| Botthof (Lanzl) | 1—2 |
| | 1—3 | Tulus (Karjalainen, Tuominen) |
| Kluge (Lanzl) | 2—3 |

6 min
Penalties
8 min
10
Shots
35

Leading Scorers

1. (Switzerland) Lara Stalder, 6 points (4+2)
2. (Switzerland) Alina Müller, 5 points (3+2)
3. (Germany) Laura Kluge, 5 points (1+4)
4. (Switzerland) Dominique Rüegg, 4 points (3+1)
  (Finland) Noora Tulus, 4 points (3+1)
5. (Switzerland) Rahel Enzler, 4 points (1+3)

Source: German Ice Hockey Federation

Leading Goaltenders

1. (Sweden) Sara Grahn, 93.6% Save percentage
2. (Switzerland) Saskia Maurer, 90.0% save percentage
3. (Germany) Jennifer Harß, 87.5% save percentage
4. (Finland) Meeri Räisänen, 83.3% save percentage
5. (Finland) Jenna Silvonen, 81.3% save percentage

Source: Finnish Ice Hockey Association

=== Individual awards ===
Best Players of the Tournament

- Best Goaltender: (Germany) Jennifer Harß
- Best Defender: (Finland) Minnamari Tuominen
- Best Forward: (Switzerland) Lara Stalder

== Six Nations Tournament in Sweden ==
The 2019–20 Euro Hockey Tour Play Off (alternatively called the 2019–20 Euro Hockey Tour Finals or Six Nations Tournament in Tranås and Eksjö, also stylized as "6 Nations Tournament") was played during 5–8 February 2020 in Eksjö and Tranås, Sweden. The tournament featured the national teams from the Czech Republic, Finland, Germany, Russia, Sweden, and Switzerland, and was played over two rounds, a group stage followed by the final placement matches. In the group stage, the teams were divided into groups of three and played a single round robin to determine their positions for the finals. Group A included Finland, Germany, and Switzerland and its matches were played at Storgårdshallen in Eksjö. Group B included the Czech Republic, Russia, and Sweden and its matches were played at Stiga Arena in Tranås. The final placement matches were played at Stiga Arena in Tranås. The Czech Republic faced Germany in the fifth place match, Russia faced Switzerland in the third place match, and Finland faced Sweden in the first place match. Finland won the match against Sweden to become the 2019–2020 Euro Hockey Tour champions.

=== Standings ===
| Pos | Team | Pld | W | OTW | OTL | L | GF | GA | GD | Pts |
|---|---|---|---|---|---|---|---|---|---|---|
| 1 | Finland | 3 | 3 | 0 | 0 | 0 | 15 | 3 | +12 | 9 |
| 2 | Sweden | 3 | 1 | 0 | 1 | 1 | 4 | 7 | −3 | 3 |
| 3 | Russia | 3 | 2 | 0 | 0 | 1 | 9 | 5 | +4 | 6 |
| 4 | Switzerland | 3 | 1 | 0 | 0 | 2 | 5 | 12 | −7 | 3 |
| 5 | Czech Republic | 3 | 1 | 1 | 0 | 1 | 5 | 7 | −2 | 3 |
| 6 | Germany | 3 | 0 | 0 | 0 | 3 | 3 | 7 | −4 | 0 |

=== Results ===
==== Group A ====
| 5 February 2020; 18:00 UTC+1 | Finland | 3–1; 1–0 / 2–0 / 0–1 | Germany | Storegårdshallen, Eksjö; Attendance: 179 |

Game reference

Eveliina Suonpää
Goalies
Jennifer Harß
Referees:
Tijana Haack
Anniina Nurmi
Linesmen:
Anna Hammar
Liv Andersson

| Lindstedt (Tapani, Nieminen) | 1–0 |
| Tapani (Vainikka) | 2–0 |
| Hakala (Nieminen) | 3–0 |
| | 3–1 | Eisenschmid (Delarbre, Wiedenfelder) |

10 min
Penalties
4 min
50
Shots
11

Players of the Game: Michelle Karvinen (FIN), Jennifer Harß (GER)

| 6 February 2020; 18:00 UTC+1 | Switzerland | 2–1; 0–0 / 1–1 / 0–1 | Germany | Storegårdshallen, Eksjö; Attendance: 152 |

Game reference

Saskia Maurer
Goalies
Jennifer Harß
Referees:
Anniina Nurmi
Julia Kainberger
Linesmen:
Anna Hammar
Filip Johansson

| Leemann (Stänz, Stalder) | 1–0 |
| | 1–1 | Gleissner (Delarbre, Eisenschmid) |
| Rüegg (Stalder, Raselli) | 2–1 |

8 min
Penalties
4 min
17
Shots
20

| 6 February 2020; 18:00 UTC+1 | Switzerland | 2–8; 0–2 / 2–3 / 0–3 | Finland | Storegårdshallen, Eksjö; Attendance: 238 |

Game reference

Saskia Maurer, Caroline Spies
Goalies
Noora Räty
Referees:
Julia Kainberger
Tijana Haack
Linesmen:
Julia Johansson
Anna Hammar

| | 0–1 | Nieminen (Savolainen) |
| | 0–2 | Yrjänen (Vainikka, Laitinen) |
| | 0–3 | Karvinen (Tapani, Hiirikoski) |
| | 0–4 | Karvinen (Tapani, Hiirikoski) |
| | 0–5 | Holopainen (Nieminen) |
| Raselli (Stalder) | 1–5 |
| Stänz | 2–5 |
| | 2–6 | Tuominen (Laitinen, Savolainen) |
| | 2–7 | Nieminen (Tapani, Karvinen) |
| | 2–8 | Nieminen (Tapani, Karvinen) |

14 min
Penalties
8 min
6
Shots
43

Players of the Game: Phoebe Stänz (SUI), Elisa Holopainen (FIN)

==== Group B ====
| 5 February 2020; 18:00 UTC+1 | Russia | 1–3; 0–0 / 1–2 / 0–1 | Sweden | Stiga Arena, Tranås; Attendance: 560 |

Game reference

Anna Prugova
Goalies
Sara Grahn
Referees:
Katarina Timglas
Maria Furberg
Linesmen:
Julia Kainberger
Julia Johansson

| | 0–1 | Rask (Olsson, Löwenhielm) |
| | 0–2 | Johansson (Grahm) |
| Shokina (Markova, Shibanova) | 1–2 |
| | 1–3 | Olsson (Löwenhielm) |

6 min
Penalties
8 min
29
Shots
19

Players of the Game: Anna Shibanova (RUS), Hanna Olsson (SWE)

| 6 February 2020; 18:00 UTC+1 | Sweden | 1–2; 0–0 / 0–1 / 1–0 / 0–0 / 0–1 | Czech Republic | Stiga Arena, Tranås; Attendance: 458 |

Game reference
| Emma Söderberg | Goalies | Klára Peslarová | Referees: Tijana Haack; Maria Furberg; Linesmen: Julia Johansson; Liv Andersson |
| / 0–1 / Hymlárová (Radová, Mlýnková); Fällman (Grahm, Carlsson) / 1–1 | | | Referees: Tijana Haack; Maria Furberg; Linesmen: Julia Johansson; Liv Andersson |
| MISS | Shootout | MISS GOAL | Referees: Tijana Haack; Maria Furberg; Linesmen: Julia Johansson; Liv Andersson |
| Shootout goal scored by Natálie Mlýnková (CZE) | | | Referees: Tijana Haack; Maria Furberg; Linesmen: Julia Johansson; Liv Andersson |
| 6 min | Penalties | 4 min | Referees: Tijana Haack; Maria Furberg; Linesmen: Julia Johansson; Liv Andersson |
| 35 | Shots | 31 | Referees: Tijana Haack; Maria Furberg; Linesmen: Julia Johansson; Liv Andersson |

Players of the Game: Fanny Rask (SWE), Klára Peslarová (CZE)

| 7 February 2020; 18:00 UTC+1 | Czech Republic | 1–5; 1–1 / 0–2 / 0–2 | Russia | Stiga Arena, Tranås; Attendance: 107 |

Game reference

Kateřina Zechovská
Goalies
Valeriya Merkusheva
Referees:
Maria Furberg
Anniina Nurmi
Linesmen:
Veronica Lovensnö
Liv Andersson

| Křížová (Lerchová) | 1–0 |
| | 1–1 | Pirogova (Shashkina, Kanayeva) |
| | 1–2 | Belyakova (Shokhina, Ganeyena) |
| | 1–3 | Ganeyeva (Shokhina) |
| | 1–4 | Shashkina (Ganeyeva) |
| | 1–5 | Shtaryova (Markova) |

6 min
Penalties
6 min
12
Shots
26

==== Finals ====
Fifth Place Game

| 8 February 2020; 12:00 UTC+1 | Germany | 1–2; 0–1 / 1–0 / 0–1 | Czech Republic | Stiga Arena, Tranås; Attendance: 127 |

Game reference

Franziska Albl
Goalies
Klára Peslarová
Referees:
Johan Wiklander
Filip Eriksson
Linesmen:
Jimmy Hellström
Philip Hanning

| | 0–1 | Mlýnková (Lerchová, Mills) |
| Delarbre (Spielberger, Wagner) | 1–1 |
| | 1–2 | Mills (Seroiszková) |

4 min
Penalties
8 min
18
Shots
18

Players of the Game: Carina Strobel (GER), Natálie Mlýnková (CZE)

Third-place game

| 8 February 2020; 15:30 UTC+1 | Switzerland | 1–3; 0–1 / 0–0 / 1–2 | Russia | Stiga Arena, Tranås; Attendance: 192 |

Game reference

Saskia Maurer
Goalies
Nadezda Morozova
Referees:
Maria Furberg
Anniina Nurmi
Linesmen:
Albin Nilsson
Liv Andersson

| | 0–1 | Belyakova (Shokhina, Batalova) |
| Rüedi (Stänz, Zimmermann) | 1–1 |
| | 1–2 | Pavlova (Nikolayeva) |
| | 1–3 | Belyakova (Mitrofanova, Shokhina) |

10 min
Penalties
10 min
18
Shots
32

Players of the Game: Saskia Maurer (SUI), Valeria Pavlova (RUS)

Final

| 8 February 2020; 19:00 UTC+1 | Finland | 4–0; 1–0 / 1–0 / 2–0 | Sweden | Stiga Arena, Tranås; Attendance: 748 |

Game reference

Noora Räty
Goalies
Sara Grahn
Referees:
Tijana Haack
Julia Kainberger
Linesmen:
Anna Hammar
Julia Johansson

| Karvinen (Tapani, Hiirikoski) | 1–0 |
| Hiirikoski (Karvinen, Nieminen) | 2–0 |
| Savolainen (Nilsson) | 3–0 |
| Karvinen (Nieminen, Tapani) | 4–0 |

4 min
Penalties
14 min
25
Shots
21

Players of the Game: Petra Nieminen (FIN), Linn Peterson (SWE)

Leading Scorers of the Tournament

1. (Finland) Petra Nieminen, 8 points (3+5)
2. (Finland) Susanna Tapani, 8 points (1+7)
3. (Finland) Michelle Karvinen, 7 points (4+3)
4. (Russia) Anna Shokhina, 5 points (1+4)
5. (Finland) Jenni Hiirikoski, 4 points (1+3)

Source: Swedish Ice Hockey Association

Leading Goaltenders of the Tournament

1. (Czech Republic) Klára Peslarová, 96.23% save percentage
2. (Finland) Noora Räty, 92.59% save percentage
3. (Germany) Jennifer Harß, 92.54% save percentage
4. (Sweden) Sara Grahn, 90.74% save percentage
5. (Switzerland) Saskia Maurer, 89.04% save percentage

Source: Swedish Ice Hockey Association

=== Individual awards ===
Best Players of the Tournament

- Best Goaltender: (Czech Republic) Klára Peslarová
- Best Defender: (Finland) Jenni Hiirikoski
- Best Forward: (Russia) Anna Shokhina

Source: Swedish Ice Hockey Association
