= Ice hockey at the 2012 Winter Youth Olympics – Girls' tournament =

2012 Winter Youth Olympics – Girls' tournament
Tournament details
- Host country: Austria
- Venue: 1 (in 1 host city)
- Dates: 13–22 January
- Teams: 5

Final positions
- Champions: Sweden (1st title)
- Runners-up: Austria
- Third place: Germany
- Fourth place: Kazakhstan

Tournament statistics
- Games played: 14
- Goals scored: 108 (7.71 per game)
- Attendance: 8,015 (573 per game)
- Scoring leader: (Sweden) Kristin Andersson (14 points)

The girls' ice hockey tournament at the 2012 Winter Youth Olympics was held from 13 to 22 January at the Tyrolean Ice Arena in Innsbruck, Austria.

== Rosters ==
Each country is allowed to enter 17 athletes each.

== Preliminary round ==
All times are local (UTC+1).

Pos	Team	Pld	W	OTW	OTL	L	GF	GA	GD	Pts	Qualification
1	Sweden	4	4	0	0	0	43	0	+43	12	Semifinals
2	Austria (H)	4	3	0	0	1	22	6	+16	9	Semifinals
3	Germany	4	2	0	0	2	12	16	−4	6	Semifinals
4	Kazakhstan	4	1	0	0	3	3	28	−25	3	Semifinals
5	Slovakia	4	0	0	0	4	1	31	−30	0	

Source: IIHF
(H) Host

13 January 2012; 08:00	Austria	9–0 (2–0, 5–0, 2–0)	Slovakia	Tyrolean Ice Arena; Attendance: 245

Game reference

Paula Marchhart
Julia Pechmann
Goalies
Nikola Kaliská
Referee:
(Finland) Kaisa Ketonen
Linesmen:
(Czech Republic) Nikola Dvořáková
(Italy) Mirjam Gruber

J. Willenshofer (V. Hummel, N. Arnberger) (PP) – 05:51	1–0
T. Grascher (J. Frick) – 08:33	2–0
T. Grascher (A. Meixner) – 15:46	3–0
A. Guertler (T. Grascher, A. Iberer) – 17:07	4–0
J. Frick – 21:34	5–0
P. Polczik (V. Hummel) – 23:32	6–0
A. Meixner (J. Willenshofer) – 24:59	7–0
J. Frick (A. Meixner, A. List) (PP) – 33:15	8–0
J. Willenshofer (V. Hummel) – 37:23	9–0

2 min
Penalties
4 min
44
Shots
3

13 January 2012; 12:30	Germany	0–11 (0–3, 0–4, 0–4)	Sweden	Tyrolean Ice Arena; Attendance: 263

Game reference

Meike Krimphove
Viola Hotter
Goalies
Sara Besseling
Referee:
(United States) Ceci Morris
Linesmen:
(Finland) Taru Tanhua
(Denmark) Trine Viskum

0–1	00:56 – K. Andersson (M. Wong)
0–2	04:32 – K. Andersson (J. Eidensten, M. Wong)
0–3	12:41 – M. Andersson (L. Peterson, C. Lillback)
0–4	16:15 – K. Andersson (J. Eidensten, M. Wong)
0–5	21:56 – L. Peterson (C. Lillback, L. Bäcklin) (PP)
0–6	28:00 – L. Peterson (M. Andersson, A. Lindberg)
0–7	29:50 – L. Peterson (C. Lillback, L. Bäcklin)
0–8	32:40 – A. Lindberg (M. Andersson, C. Lillback)
0–9	35:21 – A. Lindberg (L. Bäcklin)
0–10	39:30 – E. Alasalmi (L. Peterson)
0–11	41:09 – J. Eidensten (A. Kjellbin)

6 min
Penalties
8 min
14
Shots
45

14 January 2012; 10:15	Kazakhstan	1–8 (0–3, 1–4, 0–1)	Austria	Tyrolean Ice Arena; Attendance: 534

Game reference

Anastassiya Ogay
Goalies
Paula Marchhart
Julia Pechmann
Referee:
(Canada) Meghan Mallette
Linesmen:
(China) Hui Wang
(Finland) Taru Tanhua

	0–1	08:15 – A. Meixner (M. Kness) (PP)
	0–2	09:07 – J. Frick (N. Arnberger, V. Hummel)
	0–3	11:17 – V. Hummel (J. Frick, M. Kness)
	0–4	20:01 – A. Meixner
	0–5	22:40 – A. Schmid (J. Willenshofer, N. Prosenz)
	0–6	24:43 – A. Guertler (A. Iberer, N. Arnberger)
	0–7	26:15 – A. List (A. Meixner, J. Frick)
Z. Nurgaliyeva (S. Urpekbayeva, M. Ryspek) – 27:12	1–7
	1–8	41:58 – V. Hummel (N. Arnberger, M. Kness)

10 min
Penalties
4 min
10
Shots
32

15 January 2012; 11:15	Slovakia	0–8 (0–4, 0–1, 0–3)	Germany	Tyrolean Ice Arena; Attendance: 286

Game reference

Nikola Kaliská
Romana Kiapešová
Goalies
Viola Hotter
Referee:
(United States) Ceci Morris
Linesmen:
(China) Hui Wang
(Denmark) Trine Viskum

0–1	07:59 – V. Offermann
0–2	09:19 – V. Offermann (P. Szawlowski)
0–3	11:02 – P. Szawlowski (L. Geelhaar, A. Fiegert)
0–4	12:57 – V. Offermann (L. Geelhaar, T. Fritz) (SH)
0–5	24:25 – S. Selzer (K. Oertel, A. Fiegert) (SH)
0–6	30:46 – A. Fiegert (V. Offermann) (SH)
0–7	41:38 – A. Fiegert (V. Offermann)
0–8	43:03 – N. Korff (T. Hoppe, J. Winter) (PP)

4 min
Penalties
8 min
3
Shots
66

15 January 2012; 15:45	Sweden	17–0 (2–0, 10–0, 5–0)	Kazakhstan	Tyrolean Ice Arena; Attendance: 553

Game reference

Jessica Wahlström Hjort
Goalies
Anastassiya Ogay
Referee:
(Slovakia) Zuzana Findurová
Linesmen:
(Czech Republic) Nikola Dvořáková
(Italy) Mirjam Gruber

A. Lindberg (L. Peterson) – 00:30	1-0
W. Ekström (M. Fuhrberg) – 11:04	2-0
C. Lillback – 15:35	3-0
A. Johansson (S. Küller, M. Fuhrberg) – 15:58	4-0
L. Peterson (A. Lindberg)	5-0
L. Peterson (L. Bäcklin, C. Lillback) – 17:00	6-0
M. Wong (K. Andersson) – 18:16	7-0
K. Andersson (A. Kjellbin) – 19:50	8-0
E. Alasalmi (K. Andersson) (PP) – 22:23	9-0
L. Peterson (M. Andersson) – 23:48	10-0
S. Küller – 26:07	11-0
M. Wong (E. Alasalmi) – 29:49	12-0
J. Eidensten (K. Andersson) – 31:58	13-0
L. Peterson (A. Lindberg) – 33:18	14-0
A. Kjellbin (S. Küller) – 37:28	15-0
A. Kjellbin (A. Johansson) – 39:41	16-0
J. Eidensten (E. Alasalmi) – 40:51	17-0

4 min
Penalties
6 min
83
Shots
2

16 January 2012; 10:30	Germany	2–5 (2–2, 0–1, 0–2)	Austria	Tyrolean Ice Arena; Attendance: 475

Game reference

Viola Hotter
Goalies
Paula Marchhart
Referee:
(Canada) Meghan Mallette
Linesmen:
(Czech Republic) Nikola Dvořáková
(Finland) Taru Tanhua

	0–1	06:02 – V. Hummel (J. Willenshofer)
V. Offermann (P. Szawlowski) – 08:34	1–1
	1–2	10:51 – J. Willenshofer (A. Meixner) (SH)
P. Szawlowski (V. Offermann) (PP) – 14:31	2–2
	2–3	15:59 – T. Grascher (A. Meixner)
	2–4	31:01 – J. Willenshofer (J. Frick)
	2–5	33:34 – V. Hummel (T. Grascher)

2 min
Penalties
4 min
31
Shots
20

17 January 2012; 09:00	Austria	0–3 (0–2, 0–0, 0–1)	Sweden	Tyrolean Ice Arena; Attendance: 432

Game reference

Paula Marchhart
Goalies
Jessica Wahlström Hjort
Referee:
(United States) Ceci Morris
Linesmen:
(Italy) Mirjam Gruber
(Denmark) Trine Viskum

0–1	12:31 – A. Lindberg (M. Wong, A. Johansson)
0–2	14:44 – A. Kjellbin (L. Peterson) (PP)
0–3	32:46 – K. Andersson (A. Kjellbin)

14 min
Penalties
35 min
11
Shots
54

17 January 2012; 13:30	Slovakia	1–2 (0–1, 0–0, 1–1)	Kazakhstan	Tyrolean Ice Arena; Attendance: 359

Game reference

Romana Kiapešová
Goalies
Anastassiya Ogay
Referee:
(Finland) Kaisa Ketonen
Linesmen:
(Czech Republic) Nikola Dvořáková
(China) Hui Wang

	0–1	10:35 – S. Urpekbayeva (M. Ryspek, Z. Nurgaliyeva) (PP)
	0–2	33:38 – A. Matussevich (Z. Nurgaliyeva)
S. Vojtková (D. Pápešová) (PP) – 39:08	1–2

2 min
Penalties
8 min
15
Shots
31

18 January 2012; 09:30	Sweden	12–0 (7–0, 4–0, 1–0)	Slovakia	Tyrolean Ice Arena; Attendance: 589

Game reference

Sara Besseling
Goalies
Romana Kiapešová
Nikola Kaliská
Referee:
(Canada) Meghan Mallette
Linesmen:
(China) Hui Wang
(Denmark) Trine Viskum

J. Eidensten (A. Johansson) (PP) – 03:22	1–0
A. Kjellbin (K. Andersson) – 04:56	2–0
M. Wong (R. Höglund, W. Ekström) – 06:31	3–0
M. Wong (R. Höglund) – 06:54	4–0
C. Lillbäck – 07:08	5–0
S. Küller (M. Andersson, C. Lillbäck) – 07:50	6–0
M. Wong (E. Alasalmi) – 09:20	7–0
K. Andersson (W. Ekström) – 17:53	8–0
C. Lillbäck (S. Küller, L. Bäcklin) – 21:13	9–0
M. Wong (R. Höglund) – 29:10	10–0
K. Andersson (M. Andersson, S. Küller) – 29:51	11–0
S. Küller (K. Andersson, A. Kjellbin) – 33:37	12–0

4 min
Penalties
2 min
80
Shots
1

18 January 2012; 14:00	Kazakhstan	0–2 (0–1, 0–1, 0–0)	Germany	Tyrolean Ice Arena; Attendance: 371

Game reference
Anastassiya Ogay	Goalies	Meike Krimphove	Referee: (Slovakia) Zuzana Findurová; Linesmen: (Italy) Mirjam Gruber (Finland) Taru Tanhua
0–1 / 13:44 – L. Geelhaar (P. Szawlowski); 0–2 / 29:57 – V. Offermann (P. Szawlowski) (SH)			Referee: (Slovakia) Zuzana Findurová; Linesmen: (Italy) Mirjam Gruber (Finland) Taru Tanhua
8 min	Penalties	6 min	Referee: (Slovakia) Zuzana Findurová; Linesmen: (Italy) Mirjam Gruber (Finland) Taru Tanhua
8	Shots	34	Referee: (Slovakia) Zuzana Findurová; Linesmen: (Italy) Mirjam Gruber (Finland) Taru Tanhua

== Playoffs ==
=== Bracket ===
Semifinals
1	Sweden	11
4	Kazakhstan	0
2	Austria	2
3	Germany	0

Gold medal game
1	Sweden	3
2	Austria	0
Bronze medal game
3	Germany	7
4	Kazakhstan	4

=== Semifinals ===
20 January 2012; 12:00	Sweden	11–0 (2–0, 5–0, 4–0)	Kazakhstan	Tyrolean Ice Arena; Attendance: 713

Game reference

Jessica Wahlström Hjorth
Goalies
Anastassiya Ogay
Referee:
(United States) Ceci Morris
Linesmen:
(Czech Republic) Nikola Dvořáková
(China) Hui Wang

S. Küller (M. Andersson, C. Lillback) – 00:13	1–0
M. Fuhrberg (M. Andersson) – 07:05	2–0
A. Kjellbin (W. Ekström, A. Lindberg) (PP) – 17:17	3–0
M. Andersson (K. Andersson) – 17:52	4–0
M. Wong (E. Alasalmi, W. Ekstrom) (SH) – 21:56	5–0
S. Kuller (E. Alasalmi, K. Andersson) – 28:18	6–0
M. Fuhrberg (J. Eidensten, A. Johansson) – 29:55	7–0
J. Eidensten (M. Andersson, C. Lillback) (SH) – 35:23	8–0
L. Bäcklin (A. Johansson, J. Eidensten) (SH) – 35:53	9–0
A. Lindberg – 36:46	10–0
A. Lindberg (A. Kjellbin) – 41:24	11–0

10 min
Penalties
6 min
74
Shots
1

20 January 2012; 16:30	Austria	2–0 (0–0, 2–0, 0–0)	Germany	Tyrolean Ice Arena; Attendance: 1,311

Game reference
Paula Marchhart	Goalies	Meike Krimphove	Referee: (Canada) Meghan Mallette; Linesmen: (Italy) Mirjam Gruber (Finland) Taru Tanhua
A. Meixner (A. List) – 18:17 / 1–0; A. Meixner (V. Hummel) (PP) – 27:06 / 2–0			Referee: (Canada) Meghan Mallette; Linesmen: (Italy) Mirjam Gruber (Finland) Taru Tanhua
8 min	Penalties	6 min	Referee: (Canada) Meghan Mallette; Linesmen: (Italy) Mirjam Gruber (Finland) Taru Tanhua
12	Shots	22	Referee: (Canada) Meghan Mallette; Linesmen: (Italy) Mirjam Gruber (Finland) Taru Tanhua

=== Bronze medal game ===
21 January 2012; 12:30	Germany	7–4 (2–1, 3–1, 2–2)	Kazakhstan	Tyrolean Ice Arena; Attendance: 789

Game reference

Meike Krimphove
Viola Hotter
Goalies
Anastassiya Ogay
Referee:
(Slovakia) Zuzana Findurová
Linesmen:
(Italy) Mirjam Gruber
(China) Hui Wang

K. Oertel (P. Szawlowski) (PP) – 08:42	1–0
L. Walz (L. Geelhaar) – 12:21	2–0
	2–1	14:18 – S. Urpekbayeva (M. Ryspek)
	2–2	16:18 – M. Ryspek (PP)
V. Offermann (A. Fiegert) – 17:20	3–2
L. Geelhaar (A. Fiegert) (PP) – 20:21	4–2
K. Oertel (P. Szawlowski) (PP) – 28:16	5–2
	5–3	31:56 – M. Ryspek (S. Urpekbayeva)
V. Offermann – 38:35	6–3
V. Offermann (SH) – 40:17	7–3
	7–4	41:57 – N. Assimova

10 min
Penalties
8 min
50
Shots
9

=== Gold medal game ===
22 January 2012; 10:00	Sweden	3–0 (1–0, 1–0, 1–0)	Austria	Tyrolean Ice Arena; Attendance: 1,095

Game reference

Sara Besseling
Goalies
Paula Marchhart
Julia Pechmann
Referee:
(Finland) Kaisa Ketonen
Linesmen:
(Finland) Taru Tanhua
(Denmark) Trine Viskum

E. Alasalmi (A. Lindberg, M. Wong) (PP) – 13:20	1–0
L. Bäcklin (R. Hoglund) (PP) – 29:50	2–0
E. Alasalmi (J. Eidensten) – 37:07	3–0

4 min
Penalties
14 min
28
Shots
11
