= Biathlon at the 2012 Winter Youth Olympics – Mixed relay =

Mixed relay at the I Winter Youth Olympic Games
- Venue: Seefeld Arena
- Date: 19 January 2012
- Competitors: 72 from 18 nations

Medalists
1st place, gold medalist(s)		Franziska Preuß; Laura Hengelhaupt; Maximilian Janke; Niklas Homberg	Germany
2nd place, silver medalist(s)		Kristin Sandeggen; Karoline Næss; Haakon Livik; Kristian Andre Aalerud	Norway
3rd place, bronze medalist(s)		Léa Ducordeau; Chloé Chevalier; Fabien Claude; Aristide Bègue	France

The Mixed relay competition of the biathlon events at the 2012 Winter Youth Olympics in Innsbruck, Austria, was held on 19 January 2012, at Seefeld Arena. 18 nations took part in this event.

== Results ==
The race was started at 13:00.

Rank	Bib	Country	Time	Penalties (P+S)	Deficit
1st place, gold medalist(s)	1	Germany; Franziska Preuß; Laura Hengelhaupt; Maximilian Janke; Niklas Homberg	1:11:06.8; 16:26.0; 16:40.4; 18:56.0; 19:04.4	0+4 0+3; 0+0 0+2; 0+1 0+0; 0+1 0+0; 0+2 0+1	—
2nd place, silver medalist(s)	2	Norway; Kristin Sandeggen; Karoline Næss; Haakon Livik; Kristian Andre Aalerud	1:13:11.7; 17:07.3; 17:56.4; 19:33.5; 18:34.5	0+3 0+5; 0+1 0+0; 0+1 0+1; 0+1 0+1; 0+0 0+3	+2:04.9
3rd place, bronze medalist(s)	4	France; Léa Ducordeau; Chloé Chevalier; Fabien Claude; Aristide Bègue	1:13:27.8; 17:13.8; 18:24.1; 19:08.8; 18:41.1	0+5 1+7; 0+1 0+0; 0+2 1+3; 0+1 0+2; 0+1 0+2	+2:21.0
4	6	Ukraine; Yuliya Zhuravok; Anastasiya Merkushyna; Dmytro Ihnatyev; Maksym Ivko	1:14:47.5; 17:02.6; 16:41.3; 20:55.5; 20:08.1	0+5 3+7; 0+1 0+0; 0+1 0+1; 0+2 2+3; 0+1 1+3	+3:40.7
5	7	Italy; Lisa Vittozzi; Anna Savin; Federico Di Francesco; Xavier Guidetti	1:15:46.6; 17:44.8; 18:07.4; 19:58.8; 19:55.6	0+5 0+6; 0+2 0+3; 0+0 0+1; 0+2 0+1; 0+1 0+1	+4:39.8
6	5	Sweden; Linn Persson; Lotten Sjödén; Mattias Jonsson; Niklas Forsberg	1:16:02.9; 17:08.9; 17:25.5; 21:18.9; 20:09.6	3+9 0+3; 0+0 0+0; 0+3 0+0; 2+3 0+1; 1+3 0+2	+4:56.1
7	9	Czech Republic; Erika Jislová; Jessica Jislová; Adam Václavík; Ondřej Hošek	1:17:11.5; 18:56.7; 17:41.7; 19:48.8; 20:44.3	0+7 1+8; 0+3 0+2; 0+0 0+2; 0+1 1+3; 0+3 0+1	+6:04.7
8	16	Estonia; Maarja Maranik; Meril Beilmann; Tarvi Sikk; Rene Zahkna	1:17:29.3; 18:19.8; 18:19.4; 20:42.3; 20:07.8	1+8 3+10; 0+3 0+1; 0+1 1+3; 0+1 1+3; 1+3 1+3	+6:22.5
9	18	Canada; Sarah Beaudry; Danielle Vrielink; Aidan Millar; Stuart Harden	1:17:29.7; 17:33.5; 17:46.0; 23:21.8; 18:48.4	3+5 2+8; 0+2 0+2; 0+0 0+2; 3+3 2+3; 0+0 0+1	+6:22.9
10	8	Belarus; Tatsiana Tryfanava; Liudmila Kiaura; Viktar Kryuko; Raman Malukha	1:17:36.8; 20:10.6; 18:17.1; 19:09.3; 19:59.8	4+7 0+3; 4+3 0+1; 0+1 0+1; 0+1 0+1; 0+2 0+0	+6:30.0
11	10	Slovenia; Eva Urevc; Anthea Grum; Vid Zabret; Miha Dovžan	1:18:07.6; 19:13.7; 18:42.5; 20:32.4; 19:39.0	0+8 2+9; 0+3 2+2; 0+2 0+2; 0+3 0+2; 0+0 0+3	+7:00.8
12	12	Poland; Kinga Mitoraj; Beata Lassak; Jakub Topór; Mateusz Janik	1:18:55.5; 19:39.7; 18:42.1; 19:45.1; 20:48.6	2+8 2+10; 1+3 2+3; 0+0 0+3; 0+2 0+3; 1+3 0+1	+7:48.7
13	13	Austria; Julia Reisinger; Magdalena Millinger; Michael Pfeffer; Thorsten Bischof	1:19:05.3; 17:33.9; 18:54.9; 20:05.4; 22:31.1	1+7 3+9; 0+3 0+0; 0+1 1+3; 0+0 1+3; 1+3 1+3	+7:58.5
14	11	United States; Anna Kubek; Aleksandra Zakrzewska; Nick Proell; Sean Doherty	1:20:03.4; 17:50.4; 19:52.4; 21:31.3; 20:49.3	4+10 0+6; 0+2 0+1; 0+2 0+1; 1+3 0+2; 3+3 0+2	+8:56.6
15	17	Bulgaria; Daniela Kadeva; Mariela Georgieva; Radi Palevski; Denislav Shehtanov	11:20:19.6; 19:20.6; 19:41.6; 20:18.7; 20:58.7	0+2 1+6; 0+0 0+0; 0+1 1+3; 0+1 0+1; 0+0 0+2	+9:12.8
16	15	Finland; Jenny Ingman; Erika Jänkä; Heikki Laitinen; Antti Repo	1:20:54.2; 19:11.7; 20:01.4; 20:13.6; 21:27.5	3+10 0+9; 1+3 0+2; 1+3 0+3; 0+1 0+1; 1+3 1+3	+9:47.4
17	14	Slovakia; Ivona Fialková; Nikola Lapinová; Ondrej Kosztolányi; Peter Oravec	1:24:42.9; 20:03.7; 21:20.8; 20:29.4; 22:49.0	4+7 7+10; 2+3 2+3; 2+3 1+3; 0+1 0+1; 0+0 4+3	+13:36.1
	3	Russia; Uliana Kaisheva; Natalya Gerbulova; Aleksei Kuznetsov; Ivan Galushkin	DSQ; 16:21.3; 17:11.8; 20:11.5; 19:09.4	0+4 0+5; 0+0 0+1; 0+1 0+2; 0+1 0+1; 0+2 0+1	
