= Ida Karjalainen =

Finnish ice hockey player

- Born: 11 April 1997 (age 29) Oulu, Finland
- Height: 166 cm (5 ft 5 in)
- Weight: 62 kg (137 lb; 9 st 11 lb)
- Position: Left wing
- Shot: Left
- Played for: Kärpät Oulu; HPK Hämeenlinna; Ilves Tampere
- National team: Finland
- Playing career: 2013–2021

Ida Karjalainen (born 11 April 1997) is a Finnish ice hockey player and former member of the Finnish national team. She most recently played in the 2020–21 season of the Naisten Liiga (NSML) with Kärpät Naiset.

Karjalainen was officially named to the Finnish roster for the 2020 IIHF Women's World Championship on 4 March 2020, prior to the IIHF canceling the tournament on 7 March 2020 in response to public health concerns related to COVID-19. She has previously appeared on the national team roster at various Euro Hockey Tour tournaments in the 2018–19 and 2019–20 seasons.
