= Miho Shishiuchi =

Japanese ice hockey player

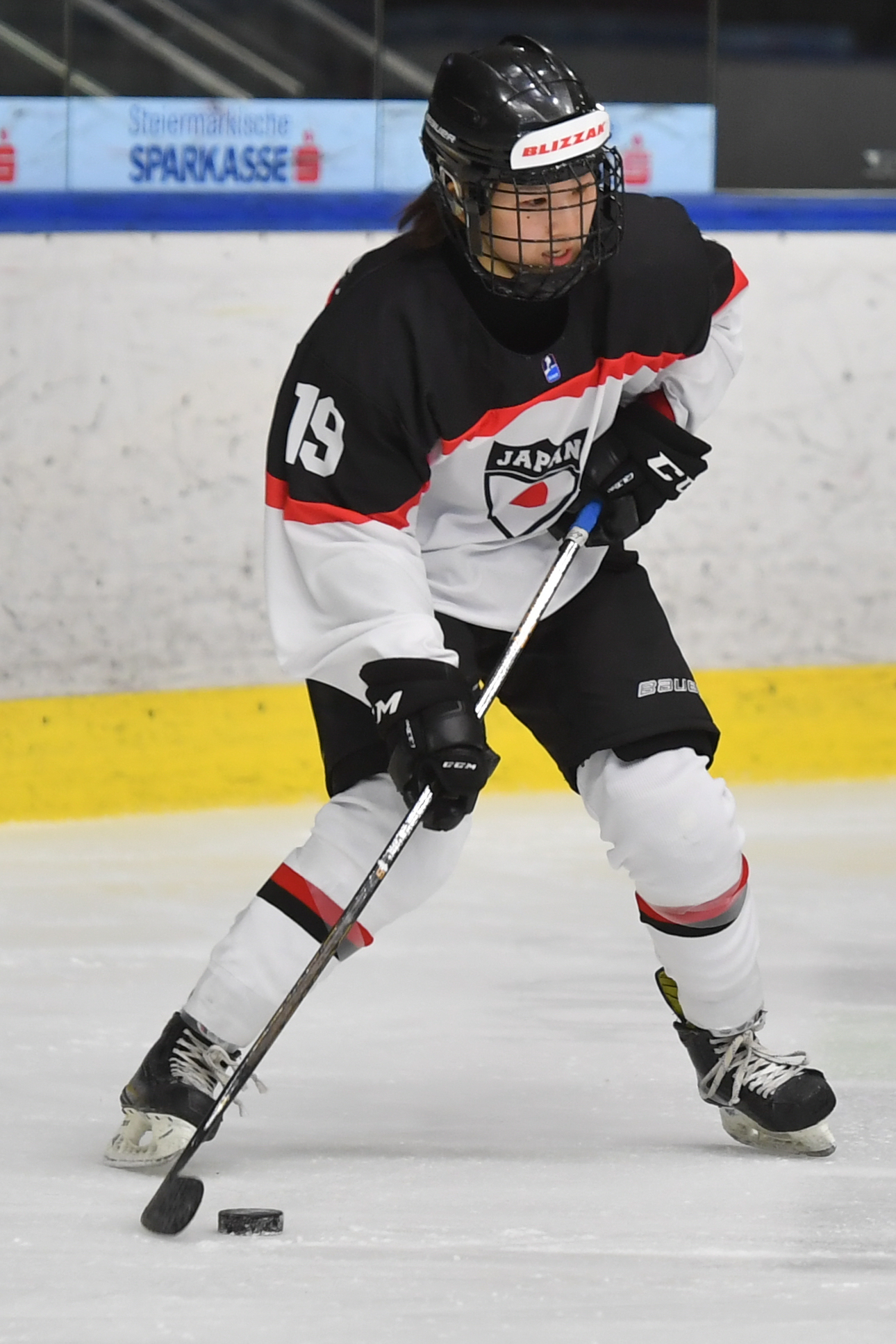
- Shishiuchi in 2017
- Born: 21 August 1992 (age 34) Kushiro, Hokkaido, Japan
- Height: 1.64 m (5 ft 5 in)
- Weight: 62 kg (137 lb; 9 st 11 lb)
- Position: Forward
- Shoots: Right
- WJIHL team Former teams: Toyota Cygnus; HPK Hämeenlinna; Kushiro Bears
- National team: Japan
- Playing career: 2008–present
Medal record
Asian Winter Games
Silver medal – second place	2011 Astana–Almaty	Ice hockey
Challenge Cup of Asia
Gold medal – first place	2012 Qiqihar

Miho Shishiuchi (獅子内 美帆, Shishiuchi Miho; born 21 August 1992) is a Japanese ice hockey player and member of the Japanese national team. She plays with Toyota Cygnus in the Women's Japan Ice Hockey League (WJIHL) and All-Japan Women's Ice Hockey Championship.

Shishiuchi has represented Japan with the senior national team since 2010, during which time she has participated in three Winter Olympic Games and six IIHF Women's World Championship tournaments. She also won a silver medal 2011 Asian Winter Games and a gold medal at the 2012 IIHF Women's Challenge Cup of Asia.

== International play ==
As a junior player with the Japanese national under-18 team, Shishiuchi participated in two IIHF U18 Women's World Championship tournaments. She was part of the Japanese roster that earned promotion to the Top Division at the Division I tournament of the 2009 IIHF U18 Women's World Championship and, the following year, contributed to Japan's successful defense of their Top Division berth at the 2010 IIHF U18 Women's World Championship in Chicago.

The women's ice hockey tournament at the 2011 Asian Winter Games was her first major event with the senior national team and she contributed a goal and an assist across four games to Japan's silver medal performance. At the 2012 IIHF Women's Challenge Cup of Asia, her two goals and one assist across three games helped Japan capture gold.

Shishiuchi represented Japan at the Top Division tournaments of the IIHF Women's World Championship in 2015, 2016, and 2021; and at the Division I, Group A tournaments in 2012, 2013, and 2017. She also participated in the Top Division playoff between Japan and the Czech Republic in November 2014.

Her Olympic experience includes the women's ice hockey tournament at the 2014 Winter Olympics in Sochi, the women's ice hockey tournament at the 2018 Winter Olympics in PyeongChang, and the women's ice hockey tournament at the 2022 Winter Olympics in Beijing.
