= 2015 IIHF Women's World Championship =

2015 edition of the IIHF Women's World Championship

Tournament details
- Host country: Sweden
- Venues: 2 (in 1 host city)
- Dates: 28 March – 4 April 2015
- Opened by: Carl XVI Gustaf
- Teams: 8

Final positions
- Champions: United States (6th title)
- Runners-up: Canada
- Third place: Finland
- Fourth place: Russia

Tournament statistics
- Games played: 20
- Goals scored: 115 (5.75 per game)
- Attendance: 15,522 (776 per game)
- Scoring leader: (United States) Hilary Knight (12 points)

Awards
- MVP: (United States) Hilary Knight

The 2015 IIHF Women's World Championship was the 16th such event organized by the International Ice Hockey Federation. The tournament was played in Malmö, Sweden, from 28 March to 4 April 2015. Venues included the Malmö Isstadion, and Rosengårds Ishall.

The United States securing their second consecutive and sixth title overall, after defeated Canada in the gold medal game 7–5. Finland won the bronze medal by beating Russia 4–1.

== Participating teams ==
The tournament was contested between eight teams divided into two groups.

Group A

- United States
- Canada
- Russia
- Finland

Group B

- Germany
- Switzerland
- Sweden
- Japan

== Venues ==
Malmö	Malmö
Malmö Isstadion; Capacity: 5,750	Rosengårds Ishall

== Format ==
The preliminary round was divided into two pools that placed the top four seeds into Group A, and the bottom four in Group B. The top two finishers in Group A advanced directly to the semifinals, while the two remaining teams and the top two in Group B played a quarterfinal round. The bottom two teams from Group B played a relegation series to determine the one team that gets relegated.

== Match officials ==
10 referees and 9 linesmen were selected for the tournament.

Referees

- (Canada) Gabrielle Ariano-Lortie
- (Finland) Anna Eskola
- (Finland) Kaisa Ketonen
- (France) Marie Picavet
- (Germany) Nicole Hertrich
- (Sweden) Gabriella Gran
- (Sweden) Katarina Timglas
- (Switzerland) Drahomira Fialova
- (United States) Katie Guay
- (United States) Jamie Huntley

Linesmen

- (Austria) Bettia Angerer
- (Canada) Stephanie Gagnon
- (Czech Republic) Ilona Novotná
- (Estonia) Kaire Leet
- (Finland) Jenni Heikkinen
- (Germany) Lisa Linnek
- (Norway) Anna Nygard
- (Sweden) Veronica Johansson
- (United States) Kate Connolly

== Rosters ==
Each team's roster consisted of at least 15 skaters (forwards, and defencemen) and 2 goaltenders, and at most 20 skaters and 3 goaltenders. All eight participating nations, through the confirmation of their respective national associations, had to submit a roster by the first IIHF directorate.

== Preliminary round ==
The schedule was announced on 10 September 2014.

All times are local (Central European Summer Time – UTC+2).

=== Group A ===
Pos	Team	Pld	W	OTW	OTL	L	GF	GA	GD	Pts	Qualification
1	United States	3	3	0	0	0	17	5	+12	9	Semifinals
2	Canada	3	2	0	0	1	12	6	+6	6	Semifinals
3	Finland	3	0	1	0	2	6	12	−6	2	Quarterfinals
4	Russia	3	0	0	1	2	4	16	−12	1	Quarterfinals

Source: IIHF

28 March 2015; 16:00	United States	4–2 (3–1, 0–1, 1–0)	Canada	Malmö Isstadion, Malmö; Attendance: 1,724

Game reference

Jessica Vetter
Goalies
Geneviève Lacasse
Referees:
(Switzerland) Drahomira Fialova
(France) Marie Picavet
Linesmen:
(Finland) Jenni Heikkinen
(Czech Republic) Ilona Novotná

Lamoureux (Picard, Lamoureux-Kolls) (PP2) – 04:04	1–0
	1–1	07:23 – Jenner (Spooner, Wakefield)
Bellamy (PP) – 11:45	2–1
Coyne (Bellamy, Schleper) (PP) – 18:29	3–1
	3–2	20:57 – Wakefield (Spooner, Jenner)
Knight (Coyne, Decker) – 46:29	4–2

8 min
Penalties
12 min
34
Shots
11

28 March 2015; 20:00	Finland	3–2 GWS (0–0, 2–2, 0–0) (OT 0–0) (SO: 1–0)	Russia	Malmö Isstadion, Malmö; Attendance: 329

Game reference

Meeri Räisänen
Goalies
Valeria Tarakanova
Referees:
(Germany) Nicole Hertrich
(Sweden) Katarina Timglas
Linesmen:
(United States) Kate Connolly
(Germany) Lisa Linnek

	0–1	23:31 – Pavlova (Gavrilova, Sosina) (PP)
Kilponen (Valila) – 24:31	1–1
	1–2	34:25 – Sosina
Lindstedt (Karvinen, Tapani) – 37:29	2–2

Hiirikoski (miss)
Tuominen (miss)
Karvinen (miss)
Tuominen
Shootout
(miss) Belyakova
(miss) Gavrilova
(miss) Kadirova
(miss) Sosina
6 min
Penalties
8 min
21
Shots
15

29 March 2015; 16:00	Canada	4–0 (3–0, 1–0, 0–0)	Russia	Malmö Isstadion, Malmö; Attendance: 363

Game reference

Ann-Renée Desbiens
Goalies
Yulia Leskina
Maria Sorokina
Referees:
(United States) Jamie Huntley
(Finland) Kaisa Ketonen
Linesmen:
(Estonia) Kaire Leet
(Norway) Anna Nygard

Ouellette (Krzyzaniak, Birchard) – 01:05	1–0
Fortino (Poulin, Johnston) – 07:17	2–0
Birchard – 19:59	3–0
Poulin (Ouellette, Johnston) – 32:25	4–0

10 min
Penalties
6 min
43
Shots
19

29 March 2015; 20:00	United States	4–1 (2–1, 2–0, 0–0)	Finland	Malmö Isstadion, Malmö; Attendance: 312

Game reference

Alex Rigsby
Molly Schaus
Goalies
Meeri Räisänen
Referees:
(Canada) Gabrielle Ariano-Lortie
(Sweden) Gabriella Gran
Linesmen:
(Austria) Bettia Angerer
(Sweden) Veronica Johansson

	0–1	10:01 – Tapani (Valila)
Knight (Decker) – 10:29	1–1
Knight (Decker) (PP) – 18:12	2–1
Coyne (Decker, Knight) – 21:16	3–1
Brandt (Keller) (SH) – 36:18	4–1

4 min
Penalties
12 min
53
Shots
12

31 March 2015; 12:00	Russia	2–9 (0–1, 2–4, 0–4)	United States	Malmö Isstadion, Malmö; Attendance: 349

Game reference

Maria Sorokina
Valeria Tarakanova
Goalies
Molly Schaus
Referees:
(Canada) Gabrielle Ariano-Lortie
(Finland) Kaisa Ketonen
Linesmen:
(Canada) Stephanie Gagnon
(Sweden) Veronica Johansson

	0–1	11:03 – Lamoureux (Schleper, Duggan)
	0–2	22:58 – Knight (Decker, Stecklein)
	0–3	25:31 – Duggan (Carpenter)
Sosina (Shukina, Goncharenko) – 26:57	1–3
Belyakova (Gavrilova) – 29:01	2–3
	2–4	37:59 – Lamoureux (Schleper) (PP)
	2–5	39:15 – Brandt (Skarupa)
	2–6	44:16 – Lamoureux (Schleper) (PP)
	2–7	47:55 – Carpenter (Lamoureux, Stecklein)
	2–8	53:10 – Decker (Knight)
	2–9	57:35 – Knight (Keller) (PP)

22 min
Penalties
4 min
5
Shots
49

31 March 2015; 16:00	Canada	6–2 (2–1, 2–0, 2–1)	Finland	Malmö Isstadion, Malmö; Attendance: 298

Game reference

Geneviève Lacasse
Goalies
Eveliina Suonpää
Referees:
(Sweden) Gabriella Gran
(United States) Katie Guay
Linesmen:
(Germany) Lisa Linnek
(Norway) Anna Nygard

Lacquette (Johnston, Poulin) (PP) – 08:56	1–0
Spooner (Wakefield) – 11:08	2–0
	2–1	12:32 – Hiirikoski (Valila, Tuominen) (PP)
Wakefield (Spooner) – 36:36	3–1
Birchard (Clark) – 37:13	4–1
Clark (Saulnier) – 54:10	5–1
	5–2	54:17 – Hiirikoski (Valila)
Spooner (Birchard, Wakefield) (PP) – 57:17	6–2

4 min
Penalties
6 min
29
Shots
17

=== Group B ===
Pos	Team	Pld	W	OTW	OTL	L	GF	GA	GD	Pts	Qualification
1	Sweden (H)	3	2	0	1	0	10	6	+4	7	Quarterfinals
2	Switzerland	3	2	0	0	1	10	5	+5	6	Quarterfinals
3	Japan	3	1	1	0	1	6	6	0	5	Relegation round
4	Germany	3	0	0	0	3	2	11	−9	0	Relegation round

Source: IIHF
(H) Host

28 March 2015; 12:00	Sweden	3–4 GWS (1–1, 1–0, 1–2) (OT 0–0) (SO: 0–1)	Japan	Malmö Isstadion, Malmö; Attendance: 2,943

Game reference

Sara Grahn
Goalies
Nana Fujimoto
Referees:
(Finland) Anna Eskola
(Finland) Kaisa Ketonen
Linesmen:
(Austria) Bettia Angerer
(Estonia) Kaire Leet

Grahm (Nordin, Borgqvist) – 04:30	1–0
	1–1	18:50 – Shishiuchi (Yoneyama)
Grahm (Andersson) (PP) – 29:36	2–1
	2–2	44:59 – Nakamura (Aoki, Ukita) (PP)
	2–3	46:32 – Osawa (Iwahara, A. Toko)
Grahm (Nordin, Borgqvist) (PP) – 49:39	3–3

Winberg (miss)
Johansson (miss)
Shootout
Kubo
(miss) Ukita
Osawa
10 min
Penalties
14 min
34
Shots
20

28 March 2015; 14:00	Germany	2–5 (0–1, 1–1, 1–3)	Switzerland	Rosengårds Ishall, Malmö; Attendance: 129

Game reference

Jennifer Harß
Goalies
Florence Schelling
Referees:
(Sweden) Gabriella Gran
(United States) Jamie Huntley
Linesmen:
(Sweden) Veronica Johansson
(Norway) Anna Nygard

	0–1	15:26 – S. Marty (N. Waidacher)
Fiegert (Karpf, Seitz) – 29:36	1–1
	1–2	38:28 – J. Marty (Stalder, S. Marty) (PP)
	1–3	42:16 – Staenz (PP)
	1–4	50:10 – S. Marty (Stalder, Staenz) (PP)
Lanzl (Spielberger) (EA) – 57:23	2–4
	2–5	59:34 – Stalder (ENG)

10 min
Penalties
6 min
30
Shots
24

29 March 2015; 12:00	Switzerland	2–3 (0–2, 0–0, 2–1)	Sweden	Malmö Isstadion, Malmö; Attendance: 2,372

Game reference

Florence Schelling
Goalies
Sara Grahn
Referees:
(United States) Katie Guay
(France) Marie Picavet
Linesmen:
(Canada) Stephanie Gagnon
(Germany) Lisa Linnek

	0–1	06:24 – Grahm (Borgqvist)
	0–2	18:07 – Andersson (Löwenhielm) (PP)
	0–3	46:56 – Johansson (Wester)
Staenz (J. Marty) (PP2, EA) – 57:55	1–3
Staenz (S. Marty, J. Marty) (PP, EA) – 59:58	2–3

14 min
Penalties
12 min
26
Shots
21

29 March 2015; 14:00	Japan	2–0 (1–0, 0–0, 1–0)	Germany	Rosengårds Ishall, Malmö; Attendance: 108

Game reference
Nana Fujimoto	Goalies	Ivonne Schröder	Referees: (Switzerland) Drahomira Fialova (Sweden) Katarina Timglas; Linesmen: (United States) Kate Connolly (Finland) Jenni Heikkinen
Adachi (Hirano) – 05:27 / 1–0; Yoneyama (Osawa) (ENG) – 58:35 / 2–0			Referees: (Switzerland) Drahomira Fialova (Sweden) Katarina Timglas; Linesmen: (United States) Kate Connolly (Finland) Jenni Heikkinen
16 min	Penalties	10 min	Referees: (Switzerland) Drahomira Fialova (Sweden) Katarina Timglas; Linesmen: (United States) Kate Connolly (Finland) Jenni Heikkinen
16	Shots	25	Referees: (Switzerland) Drahomira Fialova (Sweden) Katarina Timglas; Linesmen: (United States) Kate Connolly (Finland) Jenni Heikkinen

31 March 2015; 14:00	Switzerland	3–0 (1–0, 1–0, 1–0)	Japan	Rosengårds Ishall, Malmö; Attendance: 112

Game reference

Florence Schelling
Goalies
Nana Fujimoto
Referees:
(Germany) Nicole Hertrich
(Sweden) Katarina Timglas
Linesmen:
(Austria) Bettia Angerer
(United States) Kate Connolly

Müller (Abgottspon, Stiefel) – 13:59	1–0
Stiefel (Stalder) – 30:03	2–0
Staenz (ENG) – 59:15	3–0

12 min
Penalties
6 min
26
Shots
36

31 March 2015; 20:00	Germany	0–4 (0–1, 0–2, 0–1)	Sweden	Malmö Isstadion, Malmö; Attendance: 1,274

Game reference

Jennifer Harß
Goalies
Sara Grahn
Referees:
(Finland) Anna Eskola
(France) Marie Picavet
Linesmen:
(Estonia) Kaire Leet
(Czech Republic) Ilona Novotná

0–1	00:51 – Borgqvist (Nordin)
0–2	32:50 – Borgqvist (Bäcklin, Andersson) (PP2)
0–3	39:16 – Borgqvist (Grahm, Nordin)
0–4	55:10 – Borgqvist

14 min
Penalties
10 min
15
Shots
45

== Relegation round ==
The third and fourth placed team from Group B played a best-of-three series to determine the relegated team.

1 April 2015; 18:00	Japan	3–2 OT (0–1, 1–1, 1–0) (OT 1–0)	Germany	Rosengårds Ishall, Malmö; Attendance: 83

Game reference

Nana Fujimoto
Goalies
Ivonne Schröder
Referees:
(Switzerland) Drahomira Fialova
(Sweden) Gabriella Gran
Linesmen:
(Austria) Bettia Angerer
(Canada) Stephanie Gagnon

	0–1	07:52 – Delabre (T. Eisenschmid, Fiegert) (PP)
	0–2	25:23 – Delabre
Ukita (PP) – 39:20	1–2
Kubo (Hirano, A. Toko) – 43:30	2–2
Yoneyama (A. Toko, Koike) (PP) – 69:01	3–2

10 min
Penalties
10 min
34
Shots
22

3 April 2015; 14:00	Germany	1–2 OT (0–1, 1–0, 0–0) (OT 0–1)	Japan	Rosengårds Ishall, Malmö; Attendance: 109

Game reference

Jennifer Harß
Goalies
Nana Fujimoto
Referees:
(Canada) Gabrielle Ariano-Lortie
(Finland) Anna Eskola
Linesmen:
(Sweden) Veronica Johansson
(Norway) Anna Nygard

	0–1	04:01 – Nakamura (Suzuki, Ukita) (PP)
Fiegert (T. Eisenschmid, Delarbre) (PP) – 34:42	1–1
	1–2	62:31 – Aoki (Ukita) (PP)

14 min
Penalties
16 min
22
Shots
19

- Germany were relegated to the 2016 Division I A

== Final round ==
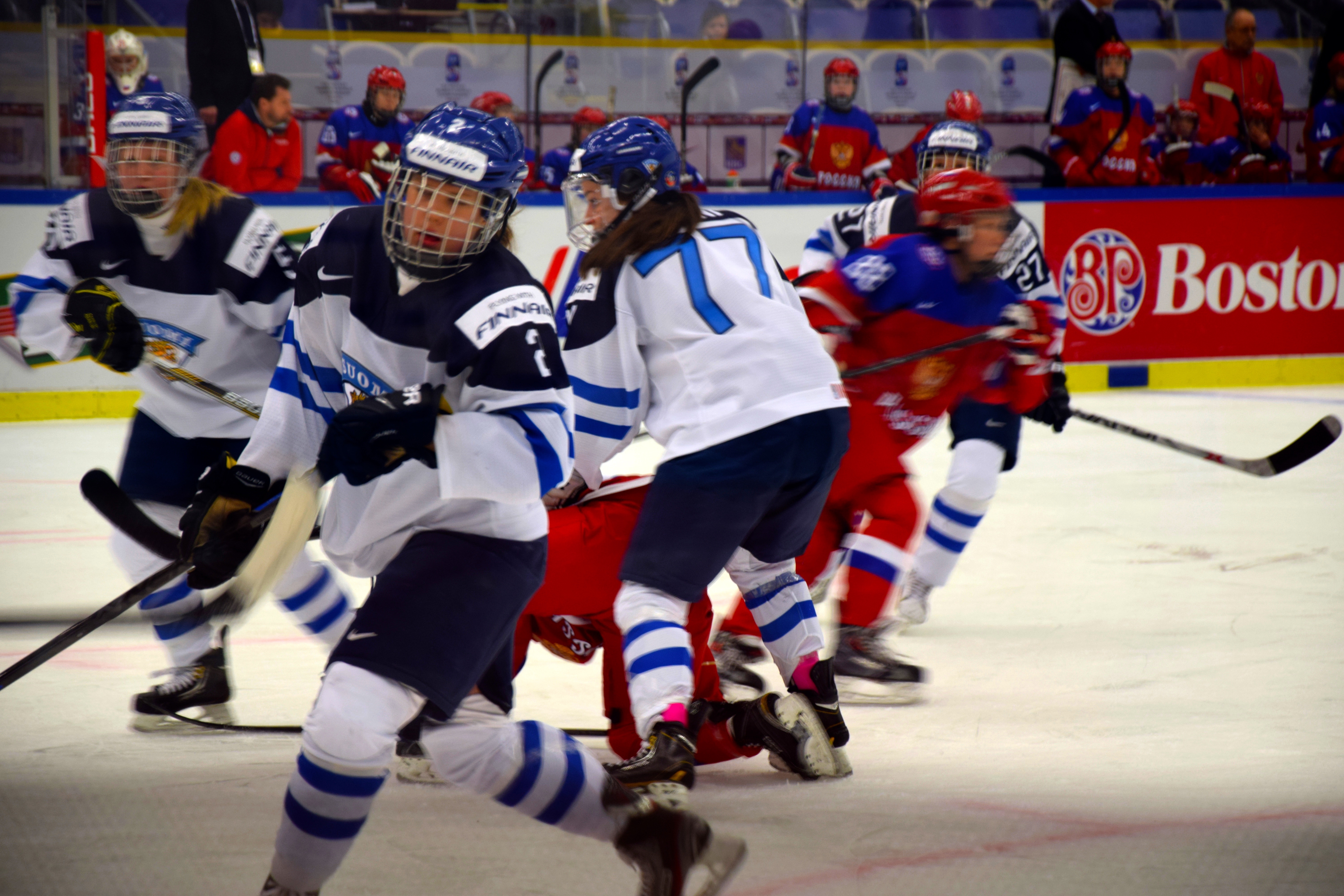
Finland - Russia

Quarterfinals
A4	Russia	2
B1	Sweden	1
A3	Finland	3
B2	Switzerland	0

Semifinals
A1	United States	13
A4	Russia	1
A2	Canada	3
A3	Finland	0

Final
A1	United States	7
A2	Canada	5
Bronze medal game
A4	Russia	1
A3	Finland	4

=== Quarterfinals ===
1 April 2015; 16:00	Finland	3–0 (1–0, 0–0, 2–0)	Switzerland	Malmö Isstadion, Malmö; Attendance: 322

Game reference

Meeri Räisänen
Goalies
Florence Schelling
Referees:
(Canada) Gabrielle Ariano-Lortie
(United States) Jamie Huntley
Linesmen:
(Sweden) Veronica Johansson
(Estonia) Kaire Leet

Karvinen (Tuominen, Hiirikoski) (PP) – 13:47	1–0
Välimäki (Tapani, Nuutinen) (PP) – 50:26	2–0
Lindstedt (Karvinen, Nieminen) (ENG) – 56:49	3–0

10 min
Penalties
12 min
31
Shots
15

1 April 2015; 20:00	Russia	2–1 (0–0, 0–1, 2–0)	Sweden	Malmö Isstadion, Malmö; Attendance: 1,714

Game reference

Maria Sorokina
Goalies
Sara Grahn
Referees:
(United States) Katie Guay
(Germany) Nicole Hertrich
Linesmen:
(Finland) Jenni Heikkinen
(Czech Republic) Ilona Novotná

	0–1	38:48 – Borgqvist (Grahm, Nordin)
Sosina (Gavrilova, Goncharenko) – 45:30	1–1
Sosina (Pavlova, Gavrilova) – 54:34	2–1

8 min
Penalties
2 min
25
Shots
25

=== Semifinals ===
3 April 2015; 12:00	United States	13–1 (4–1, 6–0, 3–0)	Russia	Malmö Isstadion, Malmö; Attendance: 426

Game reference

Jessica Vetter
Alex Rigsby
Goalies
Yulia Leskina
Valeria Tarakanova
Referees:
(Germany) Nicole Hertrich
(Sweden) Katarina Timglas
Linesmen:
(Canada) Stephanie Gagnon
(Finland) Jenni Heikkinen

	0–1	00:44 – Gavrilova
Decker (Knight, Stecklein) – 10:03	1–1
Decker (Coyne) (PP) – 14:14	2–1
Lamoureux-Kolls (Decker, Knight) – 14:32	3–1
Knight (Keller, Schleper) – 17:58	4–1
Trivigno (Stecklein, Pfalzer) (PP) – 23:40	5–1
Carpenter (Lamoureux-Kolls, Picard) – 23:49	6–1
Brandt (Skarupa) – 29:22	7–1
Skarupa (Cameranesi, Schleper) (PP) – 32:20	8–1
Lamoureux (Lamoureux-Kolls) – 34:26	9–1
Pfalzer – 39:05	10–1
Hickel – 48:56	11–1
Keller (Lamoureux) – 49:18	12–1
Decker (Coyne, Lamoureux-Kolls) – 54:03	13–1

2 min
Penalties
8 min
50
Shots
8

3 April 2015; 16:00	Canada	3–0 (1–0, 0–0, 2–0)	Finland	Malmö Isstadion, Malmö; Attendance: 584

Game reference

Ann-Renée Desbiens
Goalies
Meeri Räisänen
Referees:
(Switzerland) Drahomira Fialova
(United States) Jamie Huntley
Linesmen:
(Estonia) Kaire Leet
(Czech Republic) Ilona Novotná

Poulin (PP) – 06:32	1–0
Spooner – 40:25	2–0
Spooner – 50:08	3–0

6 min
Penalties
8 min
43
Shots
19

=== Bronze medal game ===
4 April 2015; 12:00	Finland	4–1 (2–0, 1–0, 1–1)	Russia	Malmö Isstadion, Malmö; Attendance: 448

Game reference

Meeri Räisänen
Goalies
Maria Sorokina
Referees:
(Canada) Gabrielle Ariano-Lortie
(United States) Jamie Huntley
Linesmen:
(Estonia) Kaire Leet
(Czech Republic) Ilona Novotná

Lindstedt (Karvinen) (PP) – 04:35	1–0
Karvinen (Nieminen, Hiirikoski) (PP) – 16:46	2–0
Välimäki (Rantamäki, Karvinen) – 35:39	3–0
	3–1	51:48 – Burina (Shukina)
Rantamäki (ENG) – 59:48	4–1

8 min
Penalties
14 min
26
Shots
22

=== Final ===
4 April 2015; 16:00	United States	7–5 (4–2, 1–3, 2–0)	Canada	Malmö Isstadion, Malmö; Attendance: 1,523

Game reference

Jessica Vetter
Alex Rigsby
Goalies
Ann-Renée Desbiens
Genevieve Lacasse
Referees:
(Germany) Nicole Hertrich
(Sweden) Katarina Timglas
Linesmen:
(Finland) Jenni Heikkinen
(Sweden) Veronica Johansson

Pankowski (Anderson, Trivigno) – 02:51	1–0
Knight (Lamoureux-Kolls) (PP) – 06:38	2–0
Keller (Duggan, Lamoureux) (PP) – 10:59	3–0
	3–1	12:25 – Johnston (Jenner, Lacquette) (PP)
Schleper (Lamoureux-Kolls, Cameranesi) – 17:08	4–1
	4–2	17:47 – Poulin
Skarupa (Brandt, Cameranesi) – 27:33	5–2
	5–3	30:03 – Lacquette (Ouellette)
	5–4	31:41 – Johnston (Poulin)
	5–5	32:06 – Ouellette (Lacquette)
Decker (Knight, Coyne) – 51:42	6–5
Coyne (PP) – 53:18	7–5

6 min
Penalties
10 min
36
Shots
27

== Final standings ==
Rank	Team
1st place, gold medalist(s)	United States
2nd place, silver medalist(s)	Canada
3rd place, bronze medalist(s)	Finland
4	Russia
5	Sweden
6	Switzerland
7	Japan
8	Germany

Relegated to the 2016 Division I A

== Awards and statistics ==
=== Scoring leaders ===
List shows the top skaters sorted by points, then goals.

Player	GP	G	A	Pts	+/−	PIM	POS
(United States) Hilary Knight	5	7	5	12	+8	6	F
(United States) Brianna Decker	5	5	6	11	+8	0	F
(Sweden) Anna Borgqvist	4	5	3	8	+6	2	F
(United States) Jocelyne Lamoureux	4	5	3	8	+3	2	F
(Canada) Natalie Spooner	5	4	3	7	+6	6	F
(United States) Kendall Coyne	5	3	4	7	+8	0	F
(United States) Anne Schleper	4	1	6	7	+4	2	D
(United States) Monique Lamoureux	5	1	6	7	+7	2	D
(Sweden) Erika Grahm	4	4	2	6	+7	2	F
(Canada) Marie-Philip Poulin	5	3	3	6	+4	2	F

GP = Games played; G = Goals; A = Assists; Pts = Points; +/− = Plus/minus; PIM = Penalties in minutes; POS = Position
Source: IIHF.com

=== Goaltending leaders ===
Only the top five goaltenders, based on save percentage, who have played at least 40% of their team's minutes, are included in this list.

Player	TOI	GA	GAA	SA	Sv%	SO
(Switzerland) Florence Schelling	236:13	7	1.78	118	94.07	1
(Japan) Nana Fujimoto	315:32	8	1.52	128	93.75	1
(Finland) Meeri Räisänen	301:27	10	1.99	148	93.24	1
(Canada) Ann-Renée Desbiens	140:00	4	1.71	58	93.10	2
(Germany) Ivonne Schröder	127:00	4	1.89	49	91.84	0

TOI = Time on ice (minutes:seconds); SA = Shots against; GA = Goals against; GAA = Goals against average; Sv% = Save percentage; SO = Shutouts
Source: IIHF.com

=== Awards ===
- Best players selected by the directorate:
  - Best Goaltender: (Japan) Nana Fujimoto
  - Best Defenceman: (Finland) Jenni Hiirikoski
  - Best Forward: (United States) Hilary Knight

Source: IIHF.com

- All-star team
  - Goaltender: Meeri Räisänen (FIN)
  - Defence: Monique Lamoureux (USA), Jenni Hiirikoski (FIN)
  - Forwards: Brianna Decker (USA), Hilary Knight (USA), Natalie Spooner (CAN)
