= Diana Kanayeva =

Russian ice hockey player (born 1997)

- Born: 27 March 1997 (age 28); Naberezhnye Chelny, Tatarstan, Russia
- Height: 1.71 m (5 ft 7 in)
- Weight: 62 kg (137 lb; 9 st 11 lb)
- Position: Forward
- Shoots: Left
- Played for: HC St. Petersburg
- National team: Russia
- Playing career: 2014–present

Diana Rafaelevna Kanayeva (Russian: Диа́на Рафаэ́левна Кана́ева; born 27 March 1997) is a Russian ice hockey player and member of the Russian national ice hockey team.

She competed with the Olympic Athletes from Russia team in the women's ice hockey tournament at the 2018 Winter Olympics.
