= Sonja Weidenfelder =

German-Canadian ice hockey player

- Born: March 7, 1993 (age 32) Toronto, Ontario, Canada
- Height: 168 cm (5 ft 6 in)
- Weight: 59 kg (130 lb; 9 st 4 lb)
- Position: Right wing
- Shoots: Left
- DFEL team Former teams: ECDC Memmingen; Toronto Varsity Blues
- National team: Germany
- Playing career: 2011–present

Sonja Rose Weidenfelder (born March 7, 1993) is a German-Canadian ice hockey player and member of the German national team, currently playing in the German Women's Ice Hockey League (DFEL) with ECDC Memmingen. Her college ice hockey career was played in the Ontario University Athletics (OUA) conference of U Sports with the Toronto Varsity Blues women's ice hockey program under head coach Vicky Sunohara.

She represented Germany at the IIHF Women's World Championships in 2021 and 2022.
