= Mattias Jonsson =

Swedish politician (born 1974)

- Jonsson in November 2021

Member of the Riksdag
- Incumbent
- Assumed office 4 October 2010
- Constituency: Gothenburg Municipality

Personal details
- Born: Patrik Mattias Jonsson; 1974 (age 51–52) Lysekil
- Party: Social Democratic Party

Patrik Mattias Jonsson (born 1974) is a Swedish trade unionist and politician of the Social Democratic Party who has been serving as a member of the Riksdag since 2010, representing the Gothenburg Municipality.

== Early career ==
Jonsson has had several jobs including at PLM AB in Lysekil and Volvo Cars/Pininfarina in Uddevalla. He has held various roles at the IF Metall trade union.

== Political career ==
Jonsson was a member of the municipal councils in Lysekil Municipality (1991-1997) and Stenungsund Municipality (2002-2005).

In addition to his committee assignments, Jonsson has been a member of the Swedish delegation to the Parliamentary Assembly of the Council of Europe (PACE) since 2022.
