= Anna Reich =

German ice hockey player

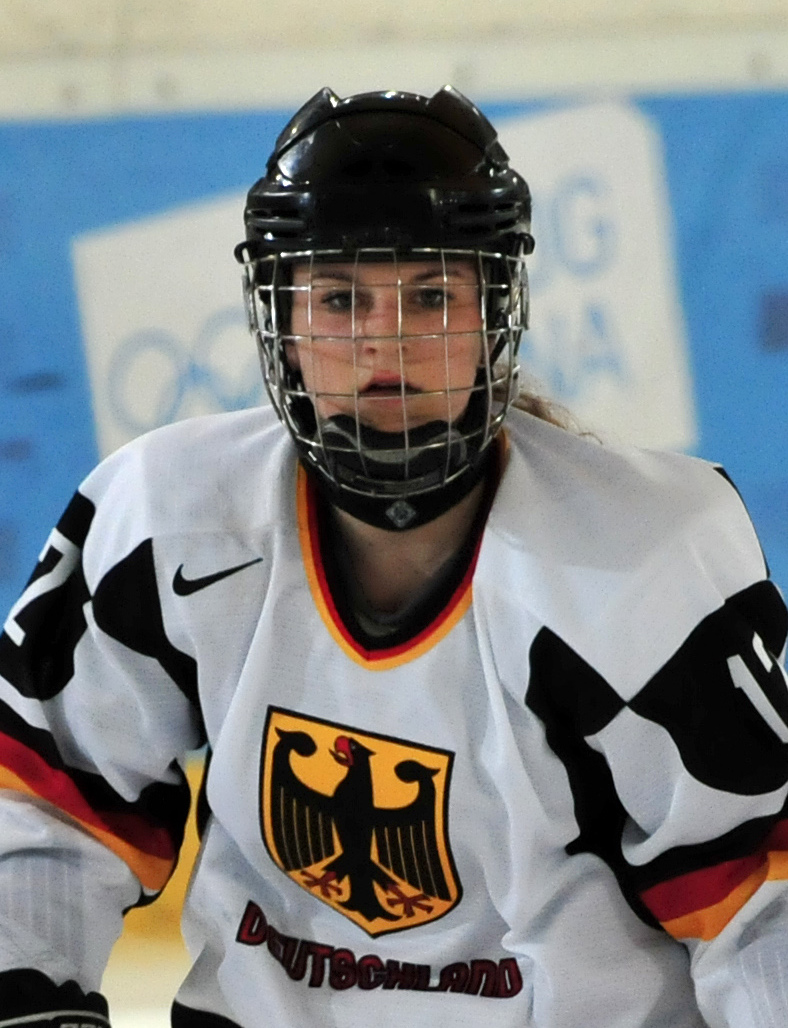
- Born: 3 April 1994 (age 32) Landshut, Germany
- Height: 1.74 m (5 ft 9 in)
- Weight: 73 kg (161 lb; 11 st 7 lb)
- Position: Defence
- Shoots: Left
- team Former teams: Minnesota Blue J's; ESC Planegg; Minnesota State Mavericks; Minnesota Whitecaps
- National team: Germany
- Playing career: 2008–present

Anna-Maria Reich, née Fiegert (born 3 April 1994) is a German ice hockey player for the Minnesota Blue J's and the German national team.

She participated at the 2015 IIHF Women's World Championship.

== Career statistics ==
=== NCAA ===
Season	GP	G	A	Pts	PIM	PPG	SHG	GWG
Minnesota State – 2013–14	33	0	4	4	12	0	0	0
Minnesota State – 2014–15	34	0	4	4	14	0	0	0
Minnesota State – 2015–16	30	4	6	10	10	3	0	0
Minnesota State – 2016–17	30	1	3	4	18	0	0	1
NCAA Totals	127	5	17	22	54	3	0	1

=== German national team ===
Event	GP	G	A	Pts	+/−	PIM
2015 Women's Ice Hockey World Championships	5	2	1	3	+ 1	2
2016 Women's Ice Hockey World Championships (Div 1A)	5	0	2	2	+ 3	2
2017 World Olympics Qualifying Tournament	3	0	0	0	0	2
2017 Women's Ice Hockey World Championships	6	1	1	2	5	6

"Anna-Maria Fiegert Career Statistics". eliteprospects.com.
