= Lotten Sjödén =

Swedish biathlete

Personal information
- Born: 7 December 1994 (age 31)

Sport
- Sport: Skiing
- Club: Älvdalens SKG
Medal record
Women's biathlon
Representing Sweden
Youth World Championships
Silver medal – second place	2012 Kontiolahti	3 × 6 km relay

Lotten Sjödén (born 7 December 1994) is a Swedish biathlete. She was part of the Swedish Junior National Team for the 2013/2014 season.

She won a silver medal in the youth women relay at the Biathlon Junior World Championships 2012 in Kontiolahti, Finland.

She competed in the first Winter Youth Olympics in 2012 in Innsbruck, Austria, ending both sprint and pursuit competitions in 4th place.
