= Emmy Alasalmi =

Swedish ice hockey player (born 1994)

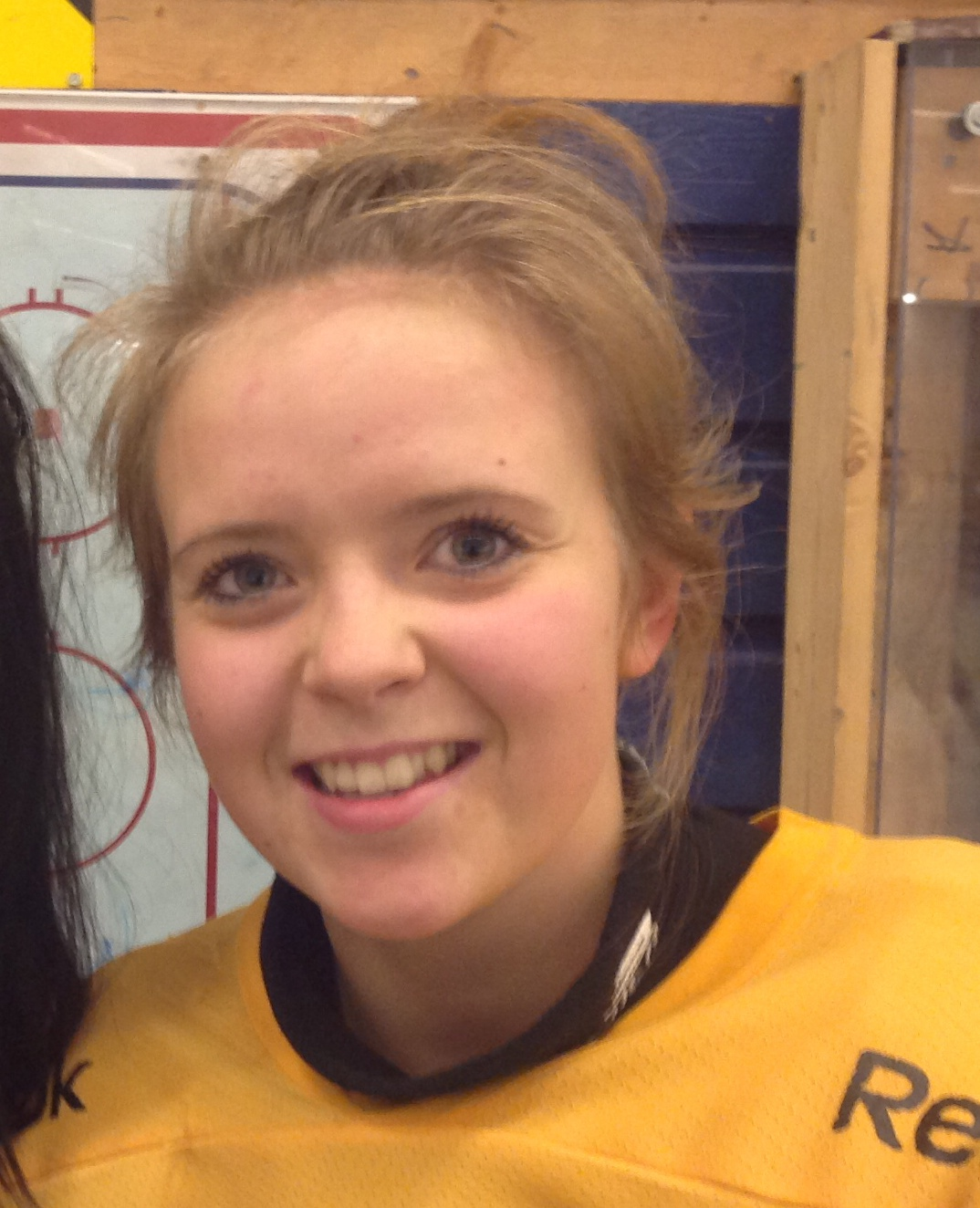
- Alasalmi with AIK in 2013
- Born: 17 January 1994 (age 32) Stockholm, Sweden
- Height: 1.61 m (5 ft 3 in)
- Weight: 65 kg (143 lb; 10 st 3 lb)
- Position: Defense
- Shoots: Right
- SDHL team Former teams: Linköping HC; AIK Hockey; Färjestad BK
- National team: Sweden
- Playing career: 2009–present

Emmy Gunilla Alasalmi (born 17 January 1994) is a Swedish ice hockey defenseman. She plays in the Swedish Women's Hockey League (SDHL) with Linköping HC. As a member of the Swedish national team, she participated in the 2018 Winter Olympics and the 2015 IIHF Women's World Championship.

Alasalmi holds the record for most games played with AIK Hockey and ranks fourth all-time among all SDHL players.

== Playing career ==
Alsalmi grew in Viggbyholm, where she played as a youth for Viggbyholms IK. In 2009, she joined AIK and made her Riksserien debut, scoring 7 points in 27 games in her rookie season.

On the 15th of February 2015, she scored the winning goal in the longest shootout in SDHL history, a 56-shot shootout round against Brynäs IF.

=== International ===
She represented Sweden at the 2015 IIHF Women's World Championship and in the women's ice hockey tournament at the 2018 Winter Olympics. Named to the Swedish roster for the 2022 Winter Olympics, she had to be replaced at the last minute after testing positive for COVID-19.

== Personal life ==
Alsalmi has studied at the Swedish School of Sport and Health Sciences.
