= Linn Peterson =

Swedish ice hockey player (born 1994)

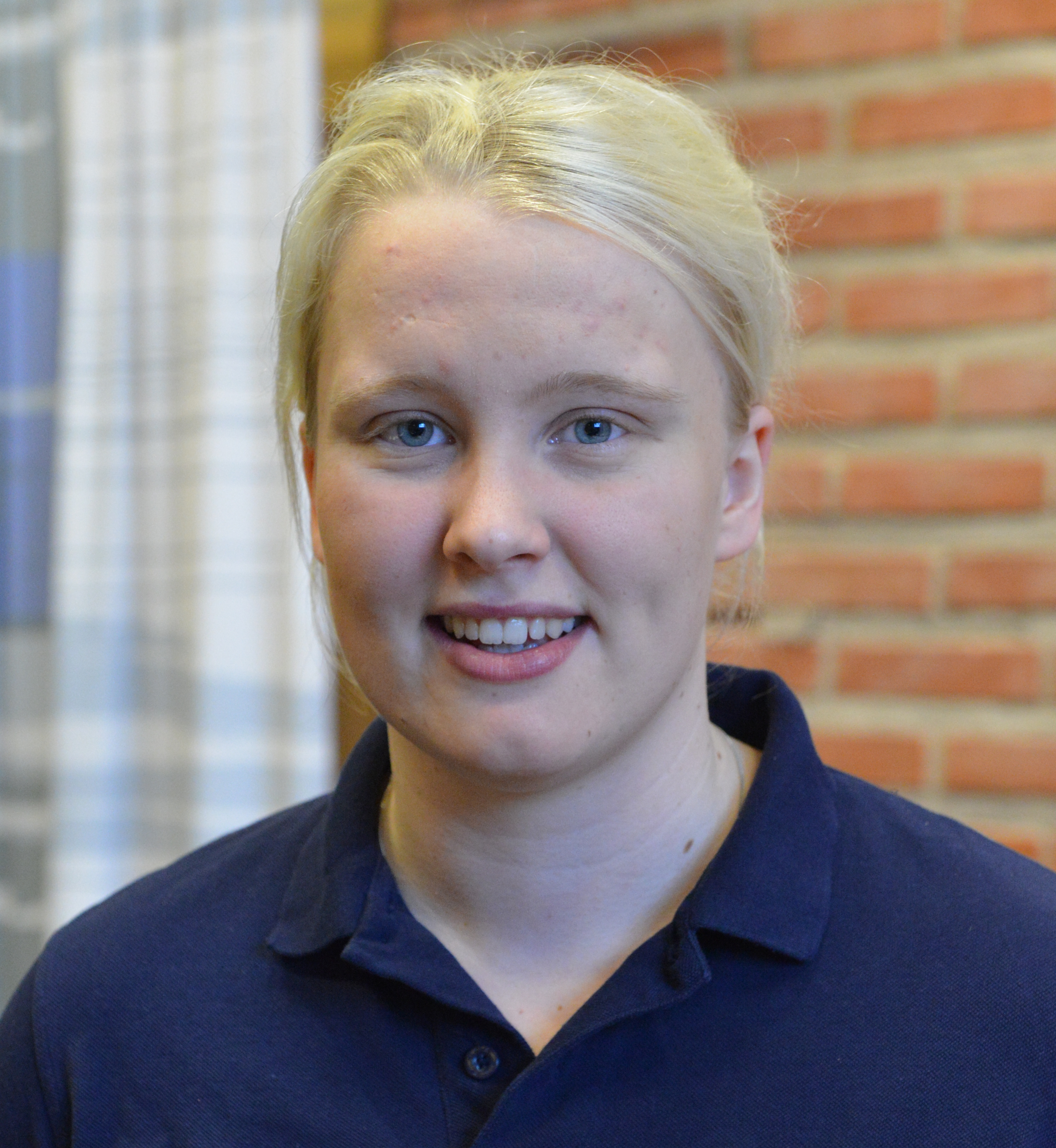
- Linn Peterson, 2016.
- Born: 8 January 1994 (age 32) Mariestad, Sweden
- Height: 1.74 m (5 ft 9 in)
- Weight: 75 kg (165 lb; 11 st 11 lb)
- Position: Right wing
- Shoots: Left
- SDHL team Former teams: Luleå HF/MSSK: Brynäs IF; Leksands IF; Hanhals IF
- National team: Sweden
- Playing career: 2009–present

Linn Peterson (born 8 January 1994) is a Swedish ice hockey forward, currently playing in the Swedish Women's Hockey League (SDHL) with Luleå HF/MSSK. She represented Sweden in the women's ice hockey tournament at the 2022 Winter Olympics in Beijing.

== Playing career ==
Peterson joined Leksands IF Dam in the 2010–11 Riksserien season and remained with the team until 2015. She joined Brynäs IF Dam for the 2015–16 season before signing with Luleå HF/MSSK in the 2016–17 season. She has gone on to win three Swedish Championship titles with Luleå.

=== International play ===
Medal record

Representing Sweden

Women's ice hockey

Youth Olympics
Gold medal – first place	2012 Innsbruck	Team

U18 World Championship
Bronze medal – third place	2012 Czech Republic	

As a member of the Swedish national under-18 team, Peterson played in the IIHF U18 World Championships in 2011 and 2012, winning the bronze medal in the latter year. She was a member of the Swedish team at the 2012 Winter Youth Olympics, where she won a gold medal.

Peterson was a late addition to the Swedish delegation at the 2022 Winter Olympics, serving as a replacement for Hanna Olsson, who tested positive for COVID-19 prior to the Games.
