= Sabina Küller =

Swedish ice hockey player and on-ice official

- Born: 22 September 1994 (age 31) Norrtälje, Sweden
- Height: 1.76 m (5 ft 9 in)
- Weight: 71 kg (157 lb; 11 st 3 lb)
- Position: Centre
- Shot: Left
- Played for: AIK IF
- National team: Sweden
- Playing career: 2009–2022

Anna Sabina Lambertz Küller (born 22 September 1994) is a Swedish ice hockey official, retired ice hockey player, and former member of the Swedish national ice hockey team. She played the entirety of her senior club career with AIK IF and served as the team's captain from 2016 until her retirement in 2022.

== Playing career ==
Küller began playing ice hockey at the age of 3 in Norrtälje, just outside of Stockholm. She grew up playing on mixed-gender teams until the age of nine, when an AIK coach scouted her for their girls' team. She would make her first Riksserien appearance with AIK in 2009–10 against Leksands IF, scoring her first goal on her first shot.

She was named AIK captain ahead of the 2016–17 SDHL season.

She missed seven weeks of the 2018–19 season after suffering a broken arm before the Christmas break. She ended up scoring 11 points in 26 games that season, her lowest total in six years as the team finished in 8th in the league for the first team in its history.

After scoring just one goal in her first 19 games in the 2020–21 SDHL season, she scored a hat-trick against Leksands IF in December 2020.

=== International ===
Küller made her first senior IIHF World Championship appearance with Sweden at the 2015 IIHF Women's World Championship and competed in the 2016, 2017, and 2019 tournaments. She scored one goal and 3 points across six games in the women's ice hockey tournament at the 2018 Winter Olympics.

== Officiating career ==
Küller was encouraged by several acquaintances to consider on-ice officiating shortly after her retirement in 2022. She was quickly recruited into a program and became invested in officiating as she learned about the development curve and found "new goals to aim for."

In her second season as an official, she was selected by SDHL players and coaches to receive the Guldpipan (lit. 'Golden Whistle') as the best referee of the 2023–24 SDHL season.

Alongside her work in Swedish leagues, Küller officiates for International Ice Hockey Federation events. As of January 2025, she has served as a referee for the Group A tournament of the 2024 IIHF Women's World Championship Division II, the Group A tournament of the 2024 IIHF U18 Women's World Championship Division I, and the 2025 IIHF U18 Women's World Championship.

== Personal life ==
In 2011, Küller experienced a serious health scare after she accidentally received six-times the standard adult dose of morphine while being treated in hospital for a herniated disc.
