= Anna Johansson (ice hockey) =

Swedish ice hockey player

Anna Johansson is a Swedish international ice hockey player.
