= Lina Bäcklin =

Swedish ice hockey player (born 1994)

- Born: 3 October 1994 (age 31) Gävle, Sweden
- Height: 169 cm (5 ft 7 in)
- Weight: 67 kg (148 lb; 10 st 8 lb)
- Position: Defence
- Shot: Left
- Played for: Brynäs IF
- National team: Sweden
- Playing career: 2010–2018

Lina Elisabeth Bäcklin (born 3 October 1994) is a Swedish retired ice hockey defenceman.

== International career ==
Bäcklin was selected for the Sweden women's national ice hockey team in the 2014 Winter Olympics. She played in all six games, not recording a point.

As of 2014, Bäcklin has also appeared for Sweden at one IIHF Women's World Championships, in 2013.

Bäcklin made three appearances for the Sweden women's national under-18 ice hockey team, at the IIHF World Women's U18 Championships, with the first in 2010. This included winning bronze medals in 2010 and 2012.

Bäcklin also appeared at the 2012 Winter Youth Olympics, winning gold as a part of the Swedish team at that event.

== Career statistics ==
Through 2013–14 season

Year	Team	Event	GP	G	A	Pts	PIM
2010	Sweden U18	U18	6	0	0	0	14
2011	Sweden U18	U18	5	2	1	3	4
2012	Sweden U18	U18	6	1	0	1	6
2012	Sweden U18	YOG	6	2	5	7	0
2013	Sweden	WW	5	0	0	0	0
2014	Sweden	Oly	6	1	2	3	2
