= Slovakia 82–0 Bulgaria =

2008 hockey match

	1	2	3	Total
Bulgaria	0	0	0	0
Slovakia	31	24	27	82
- Date: 6 September 2008
- Arena: Liepāja Arena
- City: Liepāja, Latvia
- Attendance: 37

On 6 September 2008, Slovakia and Bulgaria played an international women's ice hockey match in Liepāja, Latvia in the first round of qualification for the 2010 Winter Olympics women's ice hockey tournament. Slovakia defeated Bulgaria 82–0, making this the current world record for the largest victory in a senior international ice hockey game.

== Background ==
Women's ice hockey is governed by the International Ice Hockey Federation (IIHF) and has been played at the Winter Olympics since 1998. There were two rounds of qualification for the 2010 Olympics, with the first round contested by teams ranked 13th and lower in the IIHF World Ranking. Slovakia and Bulgaria were drawn into Group A alongside Italy, Croatia and hosts Latvia. Each team would play each other once, with the group winner advancing to the final Olympic qualification round.

Going into the tournament, Slovakia was ranked 17th out of 33 national women's ice hockey teams and had competed in the lower divisions of every Women's World Championship since 1999. Bulgaria's national women's team had been formed just a year before the tournament, and had never before competed in an IIHF-sanctioned event. In 2008, there were only 37 registered female hockey players in Bulgaria and two clubs. Before the tournament, around half of Bulgaria's players were also cut from the team after it was discovered they had not met the age limit for IIHF competition, resulting in one of the team's goalkeepers having to play as a forward.

Leading up to the game, Slovakia had defeated Latvia 2–0 and Italy 3–1, while Bulgaria had fallen 0–41 to Italy, 1–30 to Croatia and 0–39 to Latvia.

== Match summary ==
Iveta Karafiátová scored the opening goal for Slovakia after 57 seconds, and Slovakia went on to score 18 more times in the first 10 minutes. Slovakia led 31–0 after the first period and 55–0 after the second period. On average, Slovakia scored a goal every 44 seconds, which caused difficulties at times for the game's announcer, as he had to state details about each goal in both English and Latvian. Throughout the match, Slovakia made 139 shots on the Bulgarian goal, while the Bulgarians did not shoot on the Slovak goal even once.

The game took a bizarre turn in the 57th minute. With the score at 77–0, Bulgaria's coach Roman Morgunov pulled goalkeeper Liudmila Shosheva and added an extra attacker in her place. Bulgarian player Amaliya Koleva fell onto the puck twice in an attempt to play the role of goalkeeper, thus giving Slovakia two penalty shots for delaying the game (which Slovakia scored). Only after the score was 79–0 did Bulgaria put in their backup goalkeeper, Kamelia Drazheva. Slovakia promptly added three more goals, making the final score 82–0.

Ten seconds before the end of the game, Bulgarian forward Tina Lisichkova body checked Slovak defensewoman Petra Országhová from behind, knocking Országhová down and injuring her. As Lisichkova was leaving the ice, Slovak forward Anna Džurňáková slammed the Bulgarian over the head with her stick in retaliation. A fight broke out between the two teams, and both Lisichkova and Džurňáková received match penalties.

Janka Čulíková led Slovakia's scoring in the game with ten goals, while Martina Veličková scored nine, and twelve other players scored at least once.

6 September 2008; 16:30	Slovakia	82–0 (31–0, 24–0, 27–0)	Bulgaria	Liepāja Arena, Liepāja; Attendance: 37

Game reference

Monika Kvaková
Goalies
Liubomira Shosheva
Kamelia Drazheva
Referee:
(Netherlands) Debbie Hengst
Linesmen:
(Russia) Olga Davydkina
(Latvia) Sandra Minakovska

Karafiátová (Brémová) – 00:57	1–0
Gápová (Veličková, Brémová) – 01:10	2–0
Daňková (Džurňáková, Čulíková) – 02:37	3–0
Karafiátová – 03:55	4–0
Veličková (Celárová) – 04:06	5–0
Veličková (Celárová) – 04:33	6–0
Gápová (Moravčíková, Herichová) – 04:54	7–0
Moravčíková (Herichová, Gápová) – 05:05	8–0
Moravčíková (Gápová) – 05:24	9–0
Vargová (Čulíková, Daňková) – 05:44	10–0
Džurňáková (Daňková) – 05:52	11–0
Čulíková (Daňková, Vargová) – 06:03	12–0
Celárová (Sroková, Brémová) – 06:38	13–0
Celárová (Sroková, Brémová) – 06:48	14–0
Sroková (Celárová) – 07:42	15–0
Kapustová – 08:54	16–0
Vargová (Daňková, Čulíková) – 09:07	17–0
Čulíková (Daňková, Džurňáková) – 09:26	18–0
Sroková (Karafiátová) (PP) – 09:44	19–0
Konečná (Kapustová) (PP) – 10:48	20–0
Čulíková (Daňková) – 11:46	21–0
Džurňáková (Čulíková, Daňková) – 12:22	22–0
Veličková (Sroková, Celárová) – 13:12	23–0
Celárová (Karafiátová) – 13:20	24–0
Celárová (Veličková) – 13:49	25–0
Herichová – 15:23	26–0
Daňková (Džurňáková, Čulíková) – 16:17	27–0
Čulíková (Daňková) – 16:48	28–0
Brémová (Veličková, Karafiátová) – 17:43	29–0
Kapustová – 18:49	30–0
Herichová (Konečná) – 19:43	31–0
Vargová (Džurňáková) (PP) – 20:34	32–0
Čulíková (Országhová, Džurňáková)– 20:56	33–0
Veličková (Sroková, Celárová) – 21:39	34–0
Moravčíková (Herichová) – 23:01	35–0
Džurňáková (Čulíková, Vargová) – 24:00	36–0
Karafiátová (Veličková) – 24:50	37–0
Herichová (Moravčíková) – 25:51	38–0
Čulíková (Džurňáková, Daňková) – 26:45	39–0
Karafiátová (Veličková) – 28:12	40–0
Vargová (Džurňáková) (PP) – 29:35	41–0
Čulíková (Daňková, Országhová) – 29:55	42–0
Veličková (Brémová) – 30:30	43–0
Herichová (Konečná) (PP) – 31:31	44–0
Moravčíková – 32:17	45–0
Vargová – 33:15	46–0
Veličková (Sroková, Celárová) – 33:24	47–0
Celárová (Brémová) – 34:33	48–0
Gápová (Kapustová, Moravčíková) – 35:29	49–0
Gápová (Herichová, Kapustová) – 36:21	50–0
Čulíková (Džurňáková) – 37:21	51–0
Čulíková (Džurňáková, Daňková) – 38:04	52–0
Sroková (Veličková) – 38:35	53–0
Veličková (Karafiátová) – 38:51	54–0
Gápová (Kapustová) – 39:59	55–0
Vargová – 41:21	56–0
Veličková (Celárová) – 41:39	57–0
Veličková (Celárová) – 41:55	58–0
Kapustová (Moravčíková) – 42:56	59–0
Daňková (Vargová) – 43:06	60–0
Karafiátová (Brémová) – 44:02	61–0
Celárová (Veličková, Sroková) (PP) – 44:39	62–0
Gápová (Herichová) – 44:51	63–0
Celárová (Sroková)– 47:13	64–0
Karafiátová (Veličková, Celárová) – 47:42	65–0
Herichová – 50:24	66–0
Daňková (Džurňáková) – 50:53	67–0
Čulíková (Džurňáková, Daňková) – 51:40	68–0
Celárová (Karafiátová) – 51:49	69–0
Sroková – 52:10	70–0
Gápová (Herichová) – 52:59	71–0
Moravčíková (Herichová, Gápová) – 53:18	72–0
Moravčíková (Herichová) – 53:28	73–0
Kapustová (PP) – 55:38	74–0
Gápová (Herichová) – 55:51	75–0
Herichová – 56:11	76–0
Vargová (Čulíková) – 56:30	77–0
Vargová (PS) – 57:09	78–0
Sroková (PS) – 58:35	79–0
Herichová – 58:44	80–0
Kapustová (Herichová) (ENG) – 59:01	81–0
Herichová (Gápová) (ENG) – 59:11	82–0

37 min
Penalties
39 min
139
Shots
0

== Reactions ==
Slovakia head coach Miroslav Karafiát expressed astonishment at the result in a post-game interview, stating "There are no words for this. We took the game as training, the girls combined and shot with enthusiasm and it ended up how it ended up." Karafiát also urged the IIHF to take steps to prevent similar blowouts in the future, arguing that such games "are not good propagation for the sport" and have a "crushing and demotivating effect on players who are just starting to get acquainted with the hockey world".

Chair of the Bulgarian Ice Hockey Federation Dobromir Krustev criticized the Slovak team as having made "an insulting mockery" of the Bulgarians, which was "not at all sportsmanlike". Nick Iliev of The Sofia Echo blamed the Bulgarian government for the loss, claiming the players deserved the government's apology for "embarrassing" them, and for the "pathetic state of affairs of ice hockey" in Bulgaria.

The game was reported on in multiple overseas news outlets including ESPN, NHL.com and the Toronto Star.

== Aftermath ==
Slovakia went on to defeat Croatia 18–1 and finish top of their group, earning them a place in the final Olympic qualification round. Despite being the lowest-ranked team going in, Slovakia was able to defeat Germany, Kazakhstan and France to qualify for the Olympics for the first time ever. Slovakia was not as successful in the actual Olympic tournament, as the team placed 8th and last after losing all of their games, including an infamous 18–0 defeat to Canada. Slovakia has not qualified for the women's tournament at the Olympics since then.

Bulgaria took part in their first Women's World Championship in 2011, where they placed third on home ice in the Division V tournament, and have since become a regular part of the World Championship structure.

In response to this and other lopsided results in women's international ice hockey, the IIHF under René Fasel considered instituting a mercy rule for the women's game in 2010, though this ended up not materializing.

== Records ==
Guinness World Records currently lists the result as the "highest score in an ice hockey match". Slovakia's win in fact did set a record for the most goals and highest margin of victory in a senior international game, beating the previous record of 58–0 set by Australia against New Zealand at the 1987 Men's Ice Hockey World Championships. However, if junior results are counted, South Korea's under-18 team would hold that record, as they defeated Thailand 92–0 at the 1998 IIHF Asian Oceanic Junior U18 Championship.
