= Edita Raková =

Slovak ice hockey defender (born 1978)

- Born: May 18, 1978 (age 47) Humenné, Czechoslovakia
- Height: 5 ft 7 in (170 cm)
- Weight: 141 lb (64 kg; 10 st 1 lb)
- Position: Defence
- Shot: Left
- National team: Slovakia
- Playing career: 2004–2013

Edita Raková (born 18 May 1978) is a Slovak ice hockey defender.

== International career ==
Raková was selected for the Slovakia national women's ice hockey team in the 2010 Winter Olympics. She played in all five games, but did not record a point. She played in all three games of the 2010 Olympic qualifying campaign.

Raková also appeared for Slovakia at seven IIHF Women's World Championships, across three levels. Her first appearance came in 2005. She appeared at the top level championships in 2012.

== Career statistics ==
=== International career ===
Year	Team	Event	GP	G	A	Pts	PIM
2004	Slovakia	WW DII	5	0	1	1	0
2005	Slovakia	WW DII	4	0	0	0	0
2007	Slovakia	WW DII	5	0	1	1	4
2008	Slovakia	WW DI	5	0	1	1	8
2008	Slovakia	OlyQ	3	0	0	0	4
2009	Slovakia	WW DI	5	0	0	0	6
2010	Slovakia	Oly	5	0	0	0	8
2012	Slovakia	WW	3	0	0	0	0
2013	Slovakia	WW DIA	5	0	0	0	0
