= Petra Babiaková =

Slovak ice hockey player

- Born: 27 July 1977 (age 48) Zvolen, Czechoslovakia
- Height: 5 ft 7 in (170 cm)
- Weight: 139 lb (63 kg; 9 st 13 lb)
- Position: Defence
- Shot: Right
- National team: Slovakia
- Playing career: 2003–2010

Petra Babiaková (born 27 July 1977) is a Slovak retired ice hockey defender.

== International career ==
Babiaková was selected for the Slovakia national women's ice hockey team in the 2010 Winter Olympics. She played the second most minutes on her team, but did not record a point. She played in the 2010 Olympic qualifying campaign.

Babiaková also appeared for Slovakia at nine IIHF Women's World Championships, across three levels. Her first appearance came in 2003, where she scored two goals.

== Career statistics ==
=== International career ===
Year	Team	Event	GP	G	A	Pts	PIM
2003	Slovakia	WW DII	5	2	0	2	2
2004	Slovakia	WW DII	5	1	2	3	4
2005	Slovakia	WW DII	4	0	0	0	4
2007	Slovakia	WW DII	4	1	0	1	0
2008	Slovakia	WW DI	5	0	1	1	10
2008	Slovakia	OlyQ	3	0	1	1	4
2009	Slovakia	WW DI	5	0	2	2	8
2010	Slovakia	Oly	5	0	0	0	2
