= Petra Pravlíková =

Slovak ice hockey player

- Born: June 4, 1985 (age 40) Levoča, Czechoslovakia
- Height: 5 ft 8 in (173 cm)
- Weight: 159 lb (72 kg; 11 st 5 lb)
- Position: Forward
- Shot: Left
- National team: Slovakia
- Playing career: 2003–2018

Petra Pravlíková (born 4 June 1985 in Levoča, Czechoslovakia) is a Slovak former ice hockey forward.

== International career ==
Pravlíková was selected for the Slovakia national women's ice hockey team in the 2010 Winter Olympics. She played in all five games, scoring two goals. She played in the qualifying campaigns for the 2010 and 2014 Olympics.

Pravlíková also appeared for Slovakia at eight IIHF Women's World Championships, across three levels. Her first appearance came in 2004. She appeared at the top level championships in 2011.

== Career statistics ==
=== International career ===
Year	Team	Event	GP	G	A	Pts	PIM
2003	Slovakia	WW DII	5	1	2	3	8
2004	Slovakia	WW DII	5	0	3	3	12
2005	Slovakia	WW DII	4	4	2	6	2
2007	Slovakia	WW DII	5	2	3	5	6
2008	Slovakia	WW DI	5	1	2	3	10
2008	Slovakia	OlyQ	3	0	2	2	4
2009	Slovakia	WW DI	5	3	5	8	8
2010	Slovakia	Oly	5	2	0	2	10
2011	Slovakia	WW	5	0	0	0	2
2013	Slovakia	OlyQ	3	0	0	0	0
2013	Slovakia	WW DIA	5	0	1	1	8
