= Ice hockey at the 2010 Winter Olympics – Women's qualification =

Eight teams qualified for the women's ice hockey tournament at the 2010 Winter Olympics. The top six teams in the IIHF World Ranking after the 2008 Women's World Ice Hockey Championships received automatic berths into the Ice Hockey event. Lower ranked teams had an opportunity to qualify for the event. Teams ranked 13th and below were divided into two groups where they played in a first qualification round in September 2008. The two group winners from the round advanced to the second qualification round, where the teams ranked 7th through 12th joined them. In the second qualifying round, played in November 2008, the teams were again divided into two groups. The two group winners China and Slovakia advanced to the Olympic Ice Hockey Tournament.

== Qualified teams ==
Event	Date	Location	Vacancies	Qualified
2008 IIHF World Ranking	30 March 2004 – 13 April 2008	(China) Harbin	6	Canada; United States; Finland; Sweden; Switzerland; Russia
Final qualification tournament 1	6–9 November 2008	(Germany) Bad Tölz	1	Slovakia
Final qualification tournament 2	6–9 November 2008	(China) Shanghai	1	China
TOTAL			8	

Notes

1. ^{a} 2008 IIHF World Ranking were comprising the following events: 2005 World Championships, 2006 Winter Olympic Games, 2007 World Championships and 2008 World Championships.
2. ^{b} Harbin was the site for 2008 World Championship; at the conclusion of the tournament the ranking were finalized with regards to the qualification slots.
3. ^{c} Canada, USA and Sweden had already mathematically qualified after the 2007 World Championships.

== IIHF World Ranking ==
Qualified directly to Olympic Tournament
Final qualification tournament
Pre-qualification tournament

Rank	Team	WC 2008 (100%)	WC 2007 (75%)	OLY 2006 (50%)	WC 2005 (25%)	Total
1	Canada	1160	1200	1200	1160	2950
2	United States	1200	1160	1120	1200	2930
3	Finland	1120	1100	1100	1100	2770
4	Sweden	1060	1120	1160	1120	2760
5	Switzerland	1100	1060	1020	960	2645
6	Russia	1040	1020	1040	1000	2575
7	Germany	980	1000	1060	1060	2525
8	China	1000	1040	940	1040	2510
9	Japan	1020	940	920	940	2420
10	Kazakhstan	940	980	960	1020	2410
11	France	880	900	880	900	2220
12	Czech Republic	900	860	860	920	2205
13	Latvia	840	920	900	860	2195
14	Norway	860	880	840	840	2150
15	Italy	760	800	1000	820	2065
16	Slovenia	680	720	820	720	1810
17	Slovakia	920	820		800	1735
18	Denmark	800	840		880	1650
19	Austria	820	760		760	1580
20	North Korea	780	780		780	1560
21	Netherlands	740	740		740	1480
22	Australia	720	700		640	1405
23	Great Britain	700	680		700	1385
24	Belgium	640	660		680	1305
25	Hungary	620	640		660	1265
26	South Korea	600	620		600	1215
27	New Zealand	560	540		580	1110
28	South Africa	500	600		620	1105
29	Romania	540	560		560	1100
30	Croatia	660	580			1095
31	Iceland	580	500		540	1090
32	Estonia	520	520			910
33	Turkey	480	480			840
	Bulgaria					0

== Pre-qualification tournaments ==
The following teams were ranked 13th and below in the IIHF World Ranking. They were seeded according to their ranking, with the two group winners advancing to the final qualification tournaments.

=== Group A ===
Games were played in Liepāja, Latvia.

Pos	Team	Pld	W	OTW	OTL	L	GF	GA	GD	Pts	Qualification
1	Slovakia	4	4	0	0	0	105	2	+103	12	Final qualification tournament
2	Latvia (H)	4	3	0	0	1	53	3	+50	9	
3	Italy	4	2	0	0	2	51	8	+43	6	
4	Croatia	4	1	0	0	3	31	36	−5	3	
5	Bulgaria	4	0	0	0	4	1	192	−191	0	

Source: IIHF.com
(H) Host

All times are local (UTC+1).

2 September 2008; 16:30	Bulgaria	0–41 (0–17, 0–12, 0–12)	Italy	Liepāja Arena, Liepāja; Attendance: 45

Game reference

Liubomira Shosheva
Kamelia Drazheva
Goalies
Chiara Traversa
Referee:
(Czech Republic) Kateřina Ivičičová

0–1	00:26 – Divonne (Florian)
0–2	00:58 – Bettarini
0–3	01:42 – De Rocco (Da Rugna)
0–4	05:24 – Dalprà (Angeloni)
0–5	06:00 – Croce (Dalcolmo)
0–6	06:44 – De Rocco (Da Rugna)
0–7	06:56 – Vallazza (Dalprà, Friz)
0–8	07:19 – Friz (Angeloni)
0–9	08:27 – De Rocco (Fiorèse, Florian) (PP)
0–10	09:40 – Vallazza (Friz)
0–11	11:27 – Croce (Dalcomo)
0–12	11:37 – Croce Ballardini
0–13	12:25 – Da Rugna (De Rocco)
0–14	12:53 – Dalprà (Messner)
0–15	15:22 – Vallazza (Dalprà)
0–16	17:16 – Da Rugna
0–17	19:30 – Dalprà
0–18	23:20 – Croce (Casassa)
0–19	25:23 – Bettarini (PP)
0–20	27:15 – Casassa
0–21	27:28 – Croce (Dalcomo, Casassa)
0–22	27:55 – De Rocco (Dalprà)
0–23	29:27 – Fiorèse (Vallazza, Da Rugna)
0–24	31:09 – Florian (Bettarini, Divonne) (PP)
0–25	32:14 – Vallazza
0–26	33:36 – Divonne (Florian)
0–27	34:43 – Croce
0–28	36:57 – Dalprà (Divonne)
0–29	37:28 – Friz (Da Rugna)
0–30	40:19 – Divonne (Florian)
0–31	40:53 – De Rocco (Divonne) (SH)
0–32	41:18 – Vallazza (Friz) (SH)
0–33	41:59 – Ballardini
0–34	46:39 – Bettarini (Angeloni) (SH)
0–35	52:51 – De Rocco (Bettarini)
0–36	54:20 – Da Rugna (Angeloni, Vallazza)
0–37	55:50 – Croce (Casassa, Dalcomo)
0–38	56:56 – Messner (Florian, Bettarini)
0–39	58:23 – Caldart (Ballardini)
0–40	59:38 – De Rocco (Florian)
0–41	59:58 – Angleloni (Friz)

8 min
Penalties
4 min
4
Shots
122

2 September 2008; 20:00	Slovakia	2–0 (2–0, 0–0, 0–0)	Latvia	Liepāja Arena, Liepāja; Attendance: 280

Game reference
Zuzana Tomčíková	Goalies	Lolita Andriševska	Referee: (Finland) Ulla Sipilä
Veličková (Pravlíková) – 04:52 / 1–0; Džurňáková (Vargová) (PP) – 18:42 / 2–0			Referee: (Finland) Ulla Sipilä
16 min	Penalties	22 min	Referee: (Finland) Ulla Sipilä
55	Shots	22	Referee: (Finland) Ulla Sipilä

3 September 2008; 19:00	Croatia	30–1 (8–0, 13–0, 9–1)	Bulgaria	Liepāja Arena, Liepāja; Attendance: 45

Game reference

Nina Rapo
Lana Belić
Goalies
Liubomira Shosheva
Kamelia Drazheva
Referee:
(Netherlands) Debbie Hengst

Klanac (Širanović) – 00:16	1–0
Posavec (Širanović) (PP) – 03:38	2–0
Širanović (Posavec, Adamović) (PP2) – 05:23	3–0
Mihanović (Matić) – 10:05	4–0
Klanac – 11:44	5–0
Prokopec – 14:10	6–0
Matić (Filipec) (SH) – 14:48	7–0
Matić (Mihanović, Vicković) – 18:22	8–0
Posavec (Širanović, Smolec) – 20:24	9–0
Vicković (Radonić) – 22:22	10–0
Posavec (Smolec, Širanović) (PP) – 23:23	11–0
Posavec (Klanac) – 25:19	12–0
Vicković (Filipec, Pack) – 26:21	13–0
Posavec (Klanac) – 28:07	14–0
Mihanović (Pack, Filipec) – 28:28	15–0
Smolec (Posavec, Mihanović) – 31:02	16–0
Filipec (Matić) (PP) – 32:50	17–0
Posavec (Adamović, Širanović) (PP) – 34:11	18–0
Filipec – 35:46	19–0
Posavec – 38:34	20–0
Širanović (Smolec, Posavec) – 38:53	21–0
Vicković (SH) – 43:04	22–0
Posavec – 43:54	23–0
Filipec (Pintar) (PP) – 48:45	24–0
Klanac (Posavec) – 49:16	25–0
Širanović (Matić, Klanac) – 50:44	26–0
Filipec (Matić) – 51:53	27–0
	27–1	53:06 – Gospodinova (Iliycheva, Milanova)
Posavec – 53:41	28–1
Posavec (Širanović, Klanac) (SH) – 56:10	29–1
Posavec (Klanac, Širanović) – 59:36	30–1

22 min
Penalties
22 min
66
Shots
1

4 September 2008; 16:30	Italy	1–3 (1–2, 0–1, 0–0)	Slovakia	Liepāja Arena, Liepāja; Attendance: 62

Game reference

Giulia Mazzocchi
Goalies
Zuzana Tomčíková
Referee:
(Czech Republic) Kateřina Ivičičová

	0–1	02:55 – Celárová (Džurňáková)
	0–2	15:29 – Karafiátová (Veličková)
Divonne (De Rocco) (PP) – 16:38	1–2
	1–3	33:01 – Pravlíková (Kapustová, Veličková)

22 min
Penalties
14 min
19
Shots
45

4 September 2008; 20:00	Latvia	9–0 (1–0, 3–0, 5–0)	Croatia	Liepāja Arena, Liepāja; Attendance: 118

Game reference

Evija Tētiņa
Goalies
Petra Belobrk
Referee:
(Netherlands) Debbie Hengst

Pone (Agare) – 07:55	1–0
Koka (Dinsberga) – 23:57	2–0
Mihejenko (Dekmeijere) – 24:12	3–0
Koka (Pētersone) – 38:40	4–0
Geca-Miljone (Koka, Apsīte) – 45:17	5–0
Geca-Miljone (Liepiņa, Apsīte) – 50:04	6–0
Geca-Miljone (Koka, Liepina) (PP) – 52:49	7–0
Koka (Geca-Miljone, Liepina) (PP) – 53:23	8–0
Geca-Miljone – 57:17	9–0

24 min
Penalties
22 min
41
Shots
14

5 September 2008; 19:00	Bulgaria	0–39 (0–14, 0–11, 0–14)	Latvia	Liepāja Arena, Liepāja; Attendance: 115

Game reference

Liubomira Shosheva
Kamelia Drazheva
Goalies
Evija Tētiņa
Referee:
(Finland) Ulla Sipilä

0–1	04:37 – Pētersone (Fedcuna) (SH)
0–2	05:04 – Sakne (Dekmeijere) (SH)
0–3	05:32 – Mihejenko (Dekmeijere) (SH)
0–4	07:22 – Saidova (Pētersone)
0–5	08:07 – Fedcuna
0–6	08:51 – Dekmeijere (Mihejenko)
0–7	11:18 – Dekmeijere (Mihejenko)
0–8	13:51 – Mihejenko (Dekmeijere) (SH)
0–9	15:10 – Trezina
0–10	16:43 – Kurme (Dekmeijere, Mihejenko)
0–11	17:56 – Pone (Trezina, Agare)
0–12	18:20 – Saidova (Fedcuna)
0–13	18:44 – Saidova (Pētersone, Fedcuna)
0–14	19:59 – Dekmeijere (Mihejenko)
0–15	21:56 – Trezina (Pone, Agare)
0–16	24:37 – Trezina (Żabicka, Agare)
0–17	24:57 – Trezina (Agare, Pone)
0–18	25:15 – Pētersone
0–19	26:33 – Pētersone (Saidova, Liepiņa)
0–20	28:08 – Pone (Agare)
0–21	Kurme (Mihejenko, Sakne)
0–22	33:24 – Pone (Trezina, Agare)
0–23	36:15 – Dinsberga (Dekmeijere) (PP)
0–24	37:39 – Trezina (Saidova, Kronberga)
0–25	38:57 – Dekmeijere (Sakne)
0–26	42:08 – Kronberga (Trezina)
0–27	44:26 – Kurme (Mihejenko)
0–28	46:23 – Pētersone
0–29	47:29 – Trezina (Dekmeijere)
0–30	48:45 – Pone (Trezina)
0–31	49:22 – Fedcuna (Saidova, Pētersone)
0–32	51:46 – Sakne (Dinsberga)
0–33	54:44 – Fedcuna (Pētersone)
0–34	55:07 – Sakne (Dinsberga, Mihejenko)
0–35	57:01 – Pētersone
0–36	57:43 – Sakne (Mihejenko)
0–37	58:34 – Kurme (Mihejenko)
0–38	58:47 – Trezina (Agare)
0–39	59:19 – Liepiņa (Saidova, Pētersone)

4 min
Penalties
16 min
2
Shots
78

6 September 2008; 16:30	Slovakia	82–0 (31–0, 24–0, 27–0)	Bulgaria	Liepāja Arena, Liepāja; Attendance: 37

Game reference

Monika Kvaková
Goalies
Liubomira Shosheva
Kamelia Drazheva
Referee:
(Netherlands) Debbie Hengst
Linesmen:
(Russia) Olga Davydkina
(Latvia) Sandra Minakovska

Karafiátová (Brémová) – 00:57	1–0
Gápová (Veličková, Brémová) – 01:10	2–0
Daňková (Džurňáková, Čulíková) – 02:37	3–0
Karafiátová – 03:55	4–0
Veličková (Celárová) – 04:06	5–0
Veličková (Celárová) – 04:33	6–0
Gápová (Moravčíková, Herichová) – 04:54	7–0
Moravčíková (Herichová, Gápová) – 05:05	8–0
Moravčíková (Gápová) – 05:24	9–0
Vargová (Čulíková, Daňková) – 05:44	10–0
Džurňáková (Daňková) – 05:52	11–0
Čulíková (Daňková, Vargová) – 06:03	12–0
Celárová (Sroková, Brémová) – 06:38	13–0
Celárová (Sroková, Brémová) – 06:48	14–0
Sroková (Celárová) – 07:42	15–0
Kapustová – 08:54	16–0
Vargová (Daňková, Čulíková) – 09:07	17–0
Čulíková (Daňková, Džurňáková) – 09:26	18–0
Sroková (Karafiátová) (PP) – 09:44	19–0
Konečná (Kapustová) (PP) – 10:48	20–0
Čulíková (Daňková) – 11:46	21–0
Džurňáková (Čulíková, Daňková) – 12:22	22–0
Veličková (Sroková, Celárová) – 13:12	23–0
Celárová (Karafiátová) – 13:20	24–0
Celárová (Veličková) – 13:49	25–0
Herichová – 15:23	26–0
Daňková (Džurňáková, Čulíková) – 16:17	27–0
Čulíková (Daňková) – 16:48	28–0
Brémová (Veličková, Karafiátová) – 17:43	29–0
Kapustová – 18:49	30–0
Herichová (Konečná) – 19:43	31–0
Vargová (Džurňáková) (PP) – 20:34	32–0
Čulíková (Országhová, Džurňáková)– 20:56	33–0
Veličková (Sroková, Celárová) – 21:39	34–0
Moravčíková (Herichová) – 23:01	35–0
Džurňáková (Čulíková, Vargová) – 24:00	36–0
Karafiátová (Veličková) – 24:50	37–0
Herichová (Moravčíková) – 25:51	38–0
Čulíková (Džurňáková, Daňková) – 26:45	39–0
Karafiátová (Veličková) – 28:12	40–0
Vargová (Džurňáková) (PP) – 29:35	41–0
Čulíková (Daňková, Országhová) – 29:55	42–0
Veličková (Brémová) – 30:30	43–0
Herichová (Konečná) (PP) – 31:31	44–0
Moravčíková – 32:17	45–0
Vargová – 33:15	46–0
Veličková (Sroková, Celárová) – 33:24	47–0
Celárová (Brémová) – 34:33	48–0
Gápová (Kapustová, Moravčíková) – 35:29	49–0
Gápová (Herichová, Kapustová) – 36:21	50–0
Čulíková (Džurňáková) – 37:21	51–0
Čulíková (Džurňáková, Daňková) – 38:04	52–0
Sroková (Veličková) – 38:35	53–0
Veličková (Karafiátová) – 38:51	54–0
Gápová (Kapustová) – 39:59	55–0
Vargová – 41:21	56–0
Veličková (Celárová) – 41:39	57–0
Veličková (Celárová) – 41:55	58–0
Kapustová (Moravčíková) – 42:56	59–0
Daňková (Vargová) – 43:06	60–0
Karafiátová (Brémová) – 44:02	61–0
Celárová (Veličková, Sroková) (PP) – 44:39	62–0
Gápová (Herichová) – 44:51	63–0
Celárová (Sroková)– 47:13	64–0
Karafiátová (Veličková, Celárová) – 47:42	65–0
Herichová – 50:24	66–0
Daňková (Džurňáková) – 50:53	67–0
Čulíková (Džurňáková, Daňková) – 51:40	68–0
Celárová (Karafiátová) – 51:49	69–0
Sroková – 52:10	70–0
Gápová (Herichová) – 52:59	71–0
Moravčíková (Herichová, Gápová) – 53:18	72–0
Moravčíková (Herichová) – 53:28	73–0
Kapustová (PP) – 55:38	74–0
Gápová (Herichová) – 55:51	75–0
Herichová – 56:11	76–0
Vargová (Čulíková) – 56:30	77–0
Vargová (PS) – 57:09	78–0
Sroková (PS) – 58:35	79–0
Herichová – 58:44	80–0
Kapustová (Herichová) (ENG) – 59:01	81–0
Herichová (Gápová) (ENG) – 59:11	82–0

37 min
Penalties
39 min
139
Shots
0

6 September 2008; 20:00	Italy	8–0 (1–0, 4–0, 3–0)	Croatia	Liepāja Arena, Liepāja; Attendance: 82

Game reference

Chiara Traversa
Goalies
Petra Belobrk
Referee:
(Finland) Ulla Sipilä

Fiorèse (Florian) – 12:45	1–0
Divonne (Florian) – 20:12	2–0
Divonne (De Rocco, Florian) (PP) – 28:13	3–0
Dalprà (Croce) – 28:51	4–0
Fiorèse (Da Rugna) – 32:04	5–0
Angeloni (Vallazza) (PP) – 44:04	6–0
Bettarini – 56:19	7–0
Da Rugna (Fiorèse) – 56:55	8–0

16 min
Penalties
16 min
40
Shots
14

7 September 2008; 16:00	Latvia	5–1 (3–0, 1–1, 1–0)	Italy	Liepāja Arena, Liepāja; Attendance: 114

Game reference

Lolita Andriševska
Goalies
Giulia Mazzocchi
Referee:
(Netherlands) Debbie Hengst

Geca-Miljone (PP) – 09:26	1–0
Mihejenko (PP2) – 15:06	2–0
Pone (Apsīte, Liepiņa) (PP2) – 16:05	3–0
	3–1	26:55 – Florian (Angeloni, Fiorèse) (PP)
Koka (Dekmeijere) (SH) – 30:59	4–1
Geca-Miljone (Żabicka) (SH) – 58:02	5–1

16 min
Penalties
20 min
29
Shots
31

7 September 2008; 19:30	Croatia	1–18 (1–5, 0–9, 0–4)	Slovakia	Liepāja Arena, Liepāja; Attendance: 41

Game reference

Petra Belobrk
Goalies
Monika Kvaková
Referee:
(Czech Republic) Kateřina Ivičičová

	0–1	08:51 – Karafiátová (Celárová)
	0–2	10:02 – Moravčíková (Herichová, Gápová) (PP)
Filipec – 13:24	1–2
	1–3	14:40 – Čulíková (Kapustová, Daňková)
	1–4	15:29 – Karafiátová (Veličková, Brémová)
	1–5	15:56 – Matejová (Gápová) (PP)
	1–6	22:55 – Gápová (Herichová)
	1–7	23:52 – Gápová (Matejová)
	1–8	25:31 – Čulíková (Kapustová)
	1–9	27:57 – Moravčíková (Gápová, Herichová)
	1–10	29:07 – Vargová
	1–11	36:27 – Gápová (Moravčíková)
	1–12	36:55 – Vargová (Daňková, Kapustová)
	1–13	37:34 – Daňková (Čulíková, Kapustová)
	1–14	37:45 – Celárová (Veličková)
	1–15	41:39 – Celárová (Veličková)
	1–16	49:20 – Veličková (Celárová)
	1–17	54:34 – Matejová (Sroková)
	1–18	58:08 – Celárová (Matejová) (SH)

10 min
Penalties
8 min
22
Shots
75

=== Group B ===
Games were played in Maribor, Slovenia.

Pos	Team	Pld	W	OTW	OTL	L	GF	GA	GD	Pts	Qualification
1	Norway	3	3	0	0	0	19	2	+17	9	Final qualification tournament
2	Great Britain	3	1	1	0	1	10	7	+3	5	
3	Austria	3	1	0	1	1	10	5	+5	4	
4	Slovenia (H)	3	0	0	0	3	2	27	−25	0	

Source: IIHF.com
(H) Host

All times are local (UTC+2).

3 September 2008; 16:00	Norway	3–1 (1–0, 0–1, 2–0)	Great Britain	Dvorana Tabor Ledna Arena, Maribor; Attendance: 125

Game reference

Christine Smestad
Jorid Dagfinrud Øiestad
Goalies
Kelly Herring
Referee:
(Czech Republic) Ludmila Nelibová

Sletbak (Dahlström) – 15:28	1–0
	1–1	25:25 – Glenn (Aldridge)
Øien (Iversen) (SH) – 45:14	2–1
Øien (Farstad, Carlsson) – 48:14	3–1

6 min
Penalties
8 min
36
Shots
13

3 September 2008; 20:00	Slovenia	0–7 (0–1, 0–4, 0–2)	Austria	Dvorana Tabor Ledna Arena, Maribor; Attendance: 250

Game reference

Anja Jeršin
Goalies
Nina Geyer
Referee:
(Switzerland) Diane Michaud

0–1	17:08 – Kantor (Altmann, Schwärzler)
0–2	22:34 – Altmann (Verworner) (PP)
0–3	29:02 – Weber (B. Strer, Wirl)
0–4	30:42 – Schwärzler (Rothböck, Ban)
0–5	31:10 – Kantor (Altmann, Schwärzler)
0–6	41:24 – Weber (Hybler)
0–7	43:51 – Schwärzler (Altmann, Kantor)

8 min
Penalties
4 min
14
Shots
59

4 September 2008; 16:00	Austria	0–1 (0–0, 0–1, 0–0)	Norway	Dvorana Tabor Ledna Arena, Maribor; Attendance: 120

Game reference
Sandra Borschke	Goalies	Christine Smestad; Jorid Dagfinrud Øiestad	Referee: (Switzerland) Diane Michaud
0–1 / 32:54 – Hille (Lien)			Referee: (Switzerland) Diane Michaud
10 min	Penalties	10 min	Referee: (Switzerland) Diane Michaud
26	Shots	40	Referee: (Switzerland) Diane Michaud

4 September 2008; 20:00	Slovenia	1–5 (0–2, 1–1, 0–2)	Great Britain	Dvorana Tabor Ledna Arena, Maribor; Attendance: 240

Game reference

Anja Jeršin
Goalies
Laura Saunders
Kelly Herring
Referee:
(Germany) Michaela Kiefer

	0–1	03:12 – Henry (Aldridge)
	0–2	08:07 – Turner (Taylor)
	0–3	27:49 – Taylor (Aldridge) (PP)
Pren (Tominc) – 36:33	1–3
	1–4	44:22 – Kavanagh (Simpson)
	1–5	57:19 – Kavanagh (Turner, Taylor)

12 min
Penalties
10 min
17
Shots
55

5 September 2008; 16:00	Great Britain	4–3 OT (1–1, 2–1, 0–1) (OT: 1–0)	Austria	Dvorana Tabor Ledna Arena, Maribor; Attendance: 100

Game reference

Kelly Herring
Laura Saunders
Goalies
Sandra Borschke
Nina Geyer
Referee:
(Germany) Michaela Kiefer

Henry (Wiggins) (PP) – 05:35	1–0
	1–1	16:05 – Altmann (Kantor)
Taylor (Turner) (PP) – 25:45	2–1
Turner (Taylor) – 29:36	3–1
	3–2	34:32 – Altmann (Schwärzler) (PP)
	3–3	56:19 – Kantor (Altmann, Schwärzler)
Turner (Taylor) (PP) – 62:08	4–3

10 min
Penalties
16 min
55
Shots
35

5 September 2008; 20:00	Norway	15–1 (7–0, 5–0, 3–1)	Slovenia	Dvorana Tabor Ledna Arena, Maribor; Attendance: 200

Game reference

Christine Smestad
Jorid Dagfinrud Øiestad
Goalies
Anja Jeršin
Referee:
(Czech Republic) Ludmila Nelibová

Øien (Dahl) – 05:38	1–0
Farstad (Martinsen) – 06:58	2–0
Øien (Martinsen) (PP) – 07:38	3–0
Dahl (Harmens) – 09:01	4–0
Dalen (Renli) – 11:46	5–0
Øien – 12:43	6–0
Renli (Sletbak, Dalen) – 19:40	7–0
Farstad (Martinsen) – 25:04	8–0
Dahl (Harmens) – 26:05	9–0
Carlsson (Martinsen) – 28:02	10–0
Carlsson (Farstad, Martinsen) – 32:26	11–0
Martinsen (Carlsson) – 35:51	12–0
	12–1	43:02 – Kraner (Lahajnar)
Dalen (Sletbak, Renli) – 45:56	13–1
Harmens (Dahl) – 46:06	14–1
Martinsen – 49:33	15–1

4 min
Penalties
6 min
62
Shots
5

== Final Qualification Tournaments ==
By being ranked 7 through 12 in the final 2008 IIHF World Rankings, the following teams qualified for the qualification tournament. There were two winners from these tournaments that advanced to the Olympic tournament.

=== Group C ===
Games were played in Bad Tölz, Germany.

Pos	Team	Pld	W	OTW	OTL	L	GF	GA	GD	Pts	Qualification
1	Slovakia	3	3	0	0	0	6	1	+5	9	2010 Winter Olympics
2	Kazakhstan	3	2	0	0	1	9	3	+6	6	
3	Germany (H)	3	1	0	0	2	8	7	+1	3	
4	France	3	0	0	0	3	4	16	−12	0	

Source: IIHF.com
(H) Host

All times are local (UTC+1).

6 November 2008; 16:00	Kazakhstan	6–1 (1–0, 2–1, 3–0)	France	Hacker-Pschorr Arena, Bad Tölz; Attendance: 70

Game reference

Darya Obydennova
Goalies
Maïwenn Lombard
Referee:
(United States) Leah Wrazidlo

Koroleva (Fux) – 15:07	1–0
Koroleva (Konysheva) – 21:27	2–0
Yakovchuk (Shu) – 25:20	3–0
	3–1	37:05 – Allemoz (Boehrer)
Babushkin (Yakovchuk) – 56:19	4–1
Ibragimova (Potapova) (ENG) – 56:38	5–1
Potapova – 58:27	6–1

2 min
Penalties
4 min
42
Shots
25

6 November 2008; 19:00	Germany	0–2 (0–1, 0–1, 0–0)	Slovakia	Hacker-Pschorr Arena, Bad Tölz; Attendance: 294

Game reference
Jennifer Harß	Goalies	Zuzana Tomčíková	Referee: (United Kingdom) Joy Tottman
0–1 / 13:36 – Kapustová (Babiaková); 0–2 / 32:41 – Karafiátová (Pravlíková, Veličková)			Referee: (United Kingdom) Joy Tottman
8 min	Penalties	18 min	Referee: (United Kingdom) Joy Tottman
36	Shots	9	Referee: (United Kingdom) Joy Tottman

8 November 2008; 13:30	Kazakhstan	0–1 (0–0, 0–1, 0–0)	Slovakia	Hacker-Pschorr Arena, Bad Tölz; Attendance: 85

Game reference
Daria Obydennova	Goalies	Zuzana Tomčíková	Referee: (United States) Leah Wrazidlo
0–1 / 23:47 – Veličková (Pravlíková)			Referee: (United States) Leah Wrazidlo
6 min	Penalties	2 min	Referee: (United States) Leah Wrazidlo
26	Shots	22	Referee: (United States) Leah Wrazidlo

8 November 2008; 17:00	France	2–7 (0–1, 0–3, 2–3)	Germany	Hacker-Pschorr Arena, Bad Tölz; Attendance: 310

Game reference

Maïwenn Lombard
Orane Leenders
Goalies
Ivonne Schröder
Referee:
(Norway) Aina Hove

	0–1	09:21 – A. Lanzl (Bittner)
	0–2	20:42 – Busch (Anwander, Evers)
	0–3	23:06 – A. Lanzl (Tamas)
	0–4	32:25 – Evers
	0–5	46:18 – Kamenik
	0–6	46:43 – Evers (Becker, Götz)
Bouché (PP2) – 52:09	1–6
Fuster – 56:26	2–6
	2–7	59:44 Schuster (Kaminik)

2 min
Penalties
35 min
26
Shots
57

9 November 2008; 13:30	Slovakia	3–1 (1–0, 1–0, 1–1)	France	Hacker-Pschorr Arena, Bad Tölz; Attendance: 54

Game reference

Monika Kvaková
Goalies
Maïwenn Lombard
Orane Leenders
Referee:
(Norway) Aina Hove

Karafiátová (Herichová) – 06:16	1–0
Kapustová (Veličková) – 33:55	2–0
	2–1	46:43 – Serre (Allemoz, Bihaud) (PP)
Kapustová (Velickova) – 49:03	3–1

4 min
Penalties
12 min
23
Shots
23

9 November 2008; 17:00	Germany	1–3 (1–0, 0–2, 0–1)	Kazakhstan	Hacker-Pschorr Arena, Bad Tölz; Attendance: 255

Game reference

Jennifer Harß
Ivonne Schröder
Goalies
Daria Obydennova
Referee:
(United Kingdom) Joy Tottman

Grundmann (Kamenik) – 13:51	1–0
	1–1	23:50 – Sviridova (Shu)
	1–2	32:10 – Sviridova (Vassina, Fux)
	1–3	59:29 – Babushkina (ENG)

6 min
Penalties
6 min
55
Shots
23

=== Group D ===
Games were played in Shanghai, China.

Pos	Team	Pld	W	OTW	OTL	L	GF	GA	GD	Pts	Qualification
1	China (H)	3	3	0	0	0	11	3	+8	9	2010 Winter Olympics
2	Japan	3	2	0	0	1	6	5	+1	6	
3	Norway	3	0	1	0	2	3	9	−6	2	
4	Czech Republic	3	0	0	1	2	6	9	−3	1	

Source: IIHF.com
(H) Host

All times are local (UTC+8).

6 November 2008; 14:30	Japan	3–2 (2–1, 1–1, 0–0)	Czech Republic	S.U.S. Sport Complex, Shanghai; Attendance: 1,500

Game reference

Azusa Nakaoku
Goalies
Petra Šmardová
Referee:
(Germany) Nicole Hertrich

Kumano (Fujii) (PP) – 01:00	1–0
Yamanaka (Takahashi, Wada) (PP) – 10:02	2–0
	2–1	15:28 – Polenská (Studentová, Pěluchová)
Yamanaka (Wada, Kumano) – 36:23	3–1
	3–2	37:58 – Polenská (Jandíková)

12 min
Penalties
16 min
21
Shots
26

6 November 2008; 18:30	China	5–0 (2–0, 2–0, 1–0)	Norway	S.U.S. Sport Complex, Shanghai; Attendance: 3,180

Game reference

Jia Dandan
Goalies
Christine Smestad
Referee:
(Russia) Arina Ustinova

Jin (Sun) – 10:04	1–0
Qi (Jin, Sun) (PP2) – 11:41	2–0
Wang L. (Zhang B.) – 24:19	3–0
Sun – 32:03	4–0
Sun – 44:39	5–0

10 min
Penalties
24 min
40
Shots
13

7 November 2008; 14:30	Japan	3–1 (1–1, 1–0, 1–0)	Norway	S.U.S. Sport Complex, Shanghai; Attendance: 1,800

Game reference

Nana Fujimoto
Goalies
Jorid Dagfinrud Øiestad
Referee:
(Russia) Arina Ustinova

	0–1	00:57 – Farstad (PP)
Sakagami (PP2) – 11:49	1–1
Kawashima (Hirano) (PP) – 32:23	2–1
Haruna (Fujii, Yamanaka) (PP) – 44:30	3–1

18 min
Penalties
22 min
40
Shots
15

7 November 2008; 18:30	Czech Republic	3–4 (1–1, 2–1, 0–2)	China	S.U.S. Sport Complex, Shanghai; Attendance: 2,200

Game reference

Petra Šmardová
Goalies
Jia Dandan
Shi Yao
Referee:
(Canada) Mary Ann Gage

	0–1	16:22 – Gao (Zhang B., Ma)
Polenská (Mrázová) – 19:10	1–1
	1–2	28:57 – Sun
Mastná (Povová) – 33:05	2–2
Mrázová (Studentová, Polenská) (PP) – 34:10	3–2
	3–3	49:40 – Qi (Wang L., Sun) (PP)
	3–4	57:57 – Zhang B. (Wang L., Sun) (PP2)

16 min
Penalties
8 min
14
Shots
32

9 November 2008; 14:30	Norway	2–1 GWS (1–0, 0–1, 0–0) (OT: 0–0) (SO: 1–0)	Czech Republic	S.U.S. Sport Complex, Shanghai; Attendance: 1,800

Game reference
Christine Smestad	Goalies	Petra Šmardová	Referee: (Germany) Nicole Hertrich
Øien (Lien, Martinsen) (SH) – 04:32 / 1–0; / 1–1 / 27:56 – Polenská (Jandíková) (PP)			Referee: (Germany) Nicole Hertrich
Dahl	Shootout		Referee: (Germany) Nicole Hertrich
12 min	Penalties	10 min	Referee: (Germany) Nicole Hertrich
28	Shots	23	Referee: (Germany) Nicole Hertrich

9 November 2008; 18:30	China	2–0 (0–0, 1–0, 1–0)	Japan	S.U.S. Sport Complex, Shanghai; Attendance: 2,200

Game reference
Shi Yao	Goalies	Azusa Nakaoku	Referee: (Canada) Mary Anne Gage
Tang (Sun) (PP) – 28:28 / 1–0; Jin (Tang, Sun) – 43:57 / 2–0			Referee: (Canada) Mary Anne Gage
8 min	Penalties	4 min	Referee: (Canada) Mary Anne Gage
14	Shots	22	Referee: (Canada) Mary Anne Gage
