= Anna Džurňáková =

Slovak ice hockey player

- Born: January 24, 1983 (age 43) Kežmarok, Czechoslovakia
- Height: 5 ft 4 in (163 cm)
- Weight: 123 lb (56 kg; 8 st 11 lb)
- Position: Forward
- Shot: Left
- National team: Slovakia
- Playing career: 2005–2013

Anna Džurňáková (born 24 January 1983) is a Slovak retired ice hockey forward.

== International career ==
Džurňáková was selected for the Slovakia national women's ice hockey team in the 2010 Winter Olympics. During the tournament, she played in all five games, and scored one goal. She also played in all three games of the 2010 Olympic qualifying campaign.

Džurňáková appeared for Slovakia at seven IIHF Women's World Championships, across three levels. Following her tournament debut in 2005. She appeared at the top level championships in 2011 and 2012.

== Career statistics ==
=== International career ===
Year	Team	Event	GP	G	A	Pts	PIM
2005	Slovakia	WW DII	4	0	1	1	2
2007	Slovakia	WW DII	5	0	2	2	2
2008	Slovakia	WW DI	5	1	0	1	0
2008	Slovakia	OlyQ	3	0	0	0	0
2009	Slovakia	WW DI	5	0	3	3	4
2010	Slovakia	Oly	5	1	0	1	2
2011	Slovakia	WW	5	1	0	1	2
2012	Slovakia	WW	5	0	0	0	0
2013	Slovakia	WW DIA	5	1	2	3	0
