= Nikoleta Celárová =

Slovak ice hockey player

- Born: 27 February 1983 (age 43) Kežmarok, Czechoslovakia
- Height: 173 cm (5 ft 8 in)
- Weight: 69 kg (152 lb; 10 st 12 lb)
- Position: Right Wing
- Shot: Left
- Played for: HC Petržalka; HC Slovan Bratislava; MHK Martin; Popradské Líšky
- National team: Slovakia
- Playing career: 2002–2015

Nikoleta Celárová (born 27 February 1983) is a Slovak retired ice hockey forward, currently active as an ice hockey official with the International Ice Hockey Federation (IIHF).

== International career ==
Celárová was selected for the Slovakia national women's ice hockey team in the 2010 Winter Olympics. She played in all five games, but did not record a point. She played in all seven games of the 2010 Olympic qualifying campaign scoring twenty-three points.

Celárová also represented Slovakia at five IIHF Women's World Championships, across two levels. Her first appearance came in 2003, when she led the tournament in scoring.

== Career statistics ==
=== International career ===
Year	Team	Event	GP	G	A	Pts	PIM
2003	Slovakia	WW DII	5	5	3	8	6
2004	Slovakia	WW DII	4	0	1	1	4
2005	Slovakia	WW DII	4	1	2	3	4
2008	Slovakia	WW DI	5	1	0	1	8
2008	Slovakia	OlyQ	3	0	0	0	4
2009	Slovakia	WW DI	5	1	0	1	2
2010	Slovakia	Oly	5	0	0	0	0
