= Zuzana Moravčíková (ice hockey) =

Slovak ice hockey player and executive

- Born: October 23, 1980 (age 44); Ružomberok, Czechoslovakia
- Height: 168 cm (5 ft 6 in)
- Weight: 60 kg (132 lb; 9 st 6 lb)
- Position: Centre
- Shot: Right
- Played for: HC Slovan Bratislava; ŽHK Šarišanka Prešov; HC Petržalka; ŠKP Bratislava
- National team: Slovakia
- Playing career: 1998–2015

Zuzana Moravčíková (born 23 October 1980) is a Slovak retired ice hockey centre and former member of the Slovak national team. She has served as general manager of the Slovak women's national under-18 ice hockey team since 2021.

== International career ==
Moravčíková was selected to represent Slovakia in the women's ice hockey tournament at the 2010 Winter Olympics in Vancouver, where she played in all five games, though she did not record a point. She also played in the 2010 Olympic qualification tournament campaign.

Moravčíková participated in eight IIHF Women's World Championship tournaments, across two divisions. She debuted with the Slovak national team at the 1999 Ice Hockey Women's World Championship Group B and went on to play in the 2001 Division I qualification tournament in 2000, the Division II tournaments in 2003, 2004, 2005, and 2007; and the Division I tournaments in 2008 and 2009.

== Career statistics ==
=== International career ===
Year	Team	Event	GP	G	A	Pts	PIM
2003	Slovakia	WW D1	5	3	2	5	2
2004	Slovakia	WW D2	5	4	2	6	2
2005	Slovakia	WW D2	4	3	0	3	0
2007	Slovakia	WW D2	5	0	0	0	2
2008	Slovakia	WW D1	5	1	1	2	0
2008	Slovakia	OGQ	3	0	0	0	0
2009	Slovakia	WW D1	5	1	1	2	6
2010	Slovakia	OG	5	0	0	0	0
