= Mária Herichová =

Slovak ice hockey player

- Born: 12 June 1990 (age 36) Poprad, Czechoslovakia
- Height: 175 cm (5 ft 9 in)
- Weight: 72 kg (159 lb; 11 st 5 lb)
- Position: Forward
- Shot: Left
- Played for: ŠKP Bratislava; ŽHK Poprad; HC Petržalka; WE-V Flyers; HC Slovan Bratislava; Popradské Líšky
- National team: Slovakia
- Playing career: 2004–2016

Maria Herichová (born 12 June 1990) is a Slovak retired ice hockey forward and member of the Slovak national team.

== International career ==
Herichová was selected for the Slovakia national women's ice hockey team in the 2010 Winter Olympics. She played in all five games, recording one assist. She played all three games of the qualifying campaigns for the 2010 and 2014 Olympics.

Herichová has also appeared for Slovakia at six IIHF Women's World Championships, across three levels. Her first appearance came in 2007. She appeared at the top level championships in 2011 and 2012.

== Career statistics ==
=== International career ===
Year	Team	Event	GP	G	A	Pts	PIM
2007	Slovakia	WW DII	5	0	1	1	0
2008	Slovakia	WW DI	5	0	0	0	0
2008	Slovakia	OlyQ	3	0	1	1	0
2009	Slovakia	WW DI	5	0	0	0	0
2010	Slovakia	Oly	5	0	1	1	0
2011	Slovakia	WW	5	0	0	0	2
2012	Slovakia	WW	5	0	2	2	2
2013	Slovakia	OlyQ	3	0	1	1	0
2013	Slovakia	WW DIA	5	0	1	1	0
