= Petra Országhová =

Slovak ice hockey defender (born 1981)

- Born: 7 April 1981 (age 44); Banská Bystrica, Czechoslovakia
- Height: 5 ft 5 in (165 cm)
- Weight: 128 lb (58 kg; 9 st 2 lb)
- Position: Defence
- Shoots: Left
- National team: Slovakia
- Playing career: 2007–present

Petra Országhová (born 7 April 1981) is a Slovak ice hockey defender.

== International career ==
Országhová was selected for the Slovakia national women's ice hockey team in the 2010 Winter Olympics. She averaged over twenty minutes of ice time in the five games, but did not record a point. She played in the 2010 Olympic qualifying campaign.

Országhová also appeared for Slovakia at five IIHF Women's World Championships, across three levels. Her first appearance came in 2007. She appeared at the top level championships in 2011 and 2012.

== Career statistics ==
=== International career ===
Year	Team	Event	GP	G	A	Pts	PIM
2007	Slovakia	WW DII	5	0	2	2	0
2008	Slovakia	WW DI	5	0	0	0	4
2008	Slovakia	OlyQ	3	0	0	0	2
2009	Slovakia	WW DI	5	0	1	1	4
2010	Slovakia	Oly	5	0	0	0	2
2011	Slovakia	WW	5	0	0	0	2
2012	Slovakia	WW	5	0	0	0	4
