= 2004 World Ice Hockey Championships =

2004 World Ice Hockey Championships may refer to:

- 2004 Men's World Ice Hockey Championships
- 2004 Women's World Ice Hockey Championships
- 2004 World Junior Ice Hockey Championships
- 2004 IIHF World U18 Championships
