= Jana Kapustová =

Slovak ice hockey player

- Born: 11 August 1983 (age 42) Žilina, Czechoslovakia
- Height: 5 ft 7 in (170 cm)
- Weight: 146 lb (66 kg; 10 st 6 lb)
- Position: Forward
- Shot: Left
- National team: Slovakia
- Playing career: 2003–2013

Jana Kapustová (born 11 August 1983) is a Slovak retired ice hockey player who played as a forward and defender.

== International career ==
Kapustová was selected for the Slovakia national women's ice hockey team in the 2010 Winter Olympics. She played in all five games, scoring one goal, and tying for the team lead with three points. She played in the qualifying campaigns for the 2010 and 2014 Olympics.

Kapustová has also appeared for Slovakia at nine IIHF Women's World Championships, across three levels. Her first appearance came in 2003. She appeared at the top level championships in 2011 and 2012.

== Career statistics ==
=== International career ===
Year	Team	Event	GP	G	A	Pts	PIM
2003	Slovakia	WW DII	5	2	1	3	2
2004	Slovakia	WW DII	5	1	3	4	8
2005	Slovakia	WW DII	4	2	0	2	10
2007	Slovakia	WW DII	5	3	3	6	4
2008	Slovakia	WW DI	5	2	3	5	8
2008	Slovakia	OlyQ	3	3	0	3	0
2009	Slovakia	WW DI	5	2	3	5	6
2010	Slovakia	Oly	4	1	2	3	4
2011	Slovakia	WW	5	1	0	1	0
2012	Slovakia	WW	5	2	3	5	4
2013	Slovakia	WW DIA	5	3	3	6	2
2013	Slovakia	OlyQ	3	3	1	4	2
