= Nina Kamenik =

German ice hockey player

- Born: 27 April 1985 (age 41) West Berlin, West Germany
- Height: 1.60 m (5 ft 3 in)
- Weight: 57 kg (126 lb; 9 st 0 lb)
- Position: Forward
- Shoots: Left
- DFEL team Former teams: Eisbären Juniors Berlin; OSC Berlin
- National team: Germany
- Playing career: 2006–present

Nina Kamenik (born 27 April 1985) is a German ice hockey player for the Eisbären Juniors Berlin and the German national team.

She participated at the 2015 IIHF Women's World Championship.

== International career ==
Kamenik was selected for the Germany women's national ice hockey team at the 2014 Winter Olympics. She had one assist in five games.

Kamenik also played for Germany in the qualifying event for the 2014 Winter Olympics and the 2010 Olympics.

As of 2014, Kamenik has also appeared for Germany at five IIHF Women's World Championships. Her first appearance came in 2008.

== Career statistics ==
Through 2013–14 season

Year	Team	Event	GP	G	A	Pts	PIM
2008	Germany	WW	4	0	0	0	2
2008	Germany	OlyQ	3	1	2	3	2
2009	Germany	WW DI	5	1	0	1	0
2011	Germany	WW DI	4	0	3	3	2
2012	Germany	WW	5	0	1	1	2
2013	Germany	OlyQ	3	2	0	2	0
2013	Germany	WW	5	0	2	2	0
2014	Germany	Oly	5	0	1	1	0
