= Barbora Brémová =

Slovak ice hockey player

- Born: August 24, 1991 (age 34) Košice, Czechoslovakia
- Height: 5 ft 7 in (170 cm)
- Weight: 134 lb (61 kg; 9 st 8 lb)
- Position: Defence
- Shoots: Left
- National team: Slovakia
- Playing career: 2008–present

Barbora Brémová (born 24 August 1991 in Košice, Czechoslovakia) is a Slovak ice hockey defender.

== International career ==
Brémová was selected for the Slovakia national women's ice hockey team in the 2010 Winter Olympics. She played in all five games, but did not record a point. She played all three games of the qualifying campaigns for the 2010 and 2014 Olympics.

Brémová has also appeared for Slovakia at four IIHF Women's World Championships across two levels. Her first appearance came in 2008. She appeared in the top-level World Championships in 2011 and 2012.

She competed in one junior tournament for the Slovakia women's national under-18 ice hockey team, playing in Division I in 2009.

== Career statistics ==
=== International career ===
Year	Team	Event	GP	G	A	Pts	PIM
2008	Slovakia	WW DI	5	0	1	1	10
2008	Slovakia	OlyQ	3	0	0	0	2
2009	Slovakia U18	U18DI	4	0	0	0	8
2010	Slovakia	Oly	5	0	0	0	4
2011	Slovakia	WW	5	0	0	0	2
2012	Slovakia	WW	5	0	0	0	0
2013	Slovakia	OlyQ	3	0	0	0	2
2013	Slovakia	WW DIA	5	0	0	0	0
