= Michela Angeloni =

Italian ice hockey player (born 1984)

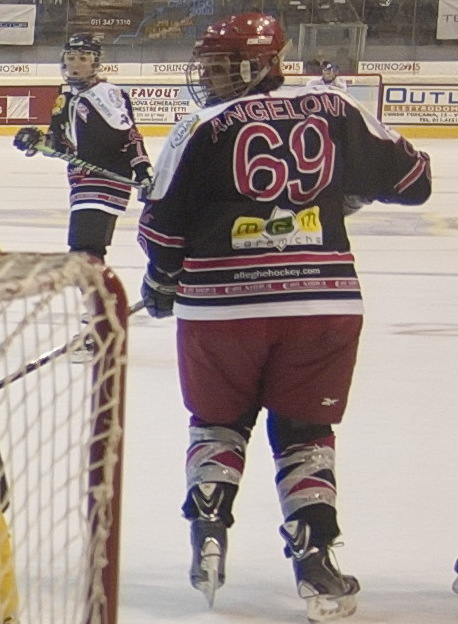
- Michela Angeloni in 2014

Personal information
- Nationality: Italian
- Born: 25 September 1984 (age 41) Bergamo, Italy

Sport
- Sport: Ice hockey

Michela Angeloni (born 25 September 1984) is an Italian ice hockey player. She competed in the women's tournament at the 2006 Winter Olympics.
