= Satu Hoikkala =

Finnish ice hockey player

- Born: 14 January 1980 (age 46) Vantaa, Finland
- Height: 164 cm (5 ft 5 in)
- Weight: 65 kg (143 lb; 10 st 3 lb)
- Position: Forward
- Shot: Right
- Played for: Keravan Shakers; IHK Helsinki; Oulun Kärpät
- National team: Finland
- Playing career: c. 1997–2008
Medal record
World Championship
Bronze medal – third place	2004 Canada

Satu Inkeri Auno née Hoikkala (born 14 January 1980) is a Finnish retired ice hockey player and on-ice official. She competed with the Finnish national team in 92 international matches, including the women's ice hockey tournaments at the 2002 Winter Olympics and the 2006 Winter Olympics.
