= 2003 IIHF Women's World Championships =

2003 IIHF Women's World Championship
Tournament details
- Host countries: Latvia; Italy; Slovenia
- Opened by: Vaira Vīķe-Freiberga, Carlo Azeglio Ciampi and Janez Drnovšek

The Top Division of the 2003 IIHF Women's World Championship was set to be held in Beijing, China, from April 4 to 9, 2003. However, it was cancelled due to the global SARS outbreak. The teams from Russia, Germany, Sweden, and Switzerland were already in China, while the American and Finnish teams were awaiting word on whether they should travel when the IIHF indicated that the Championship was to be postponed or even cancelled. The move to cancel was a logical one, as the Canadians were under a government order not to travel at all at that time.

Only the Top Division event was cancelled, as the lower divisions still had their tournaments. The Division I tournament was held in Ventspils, Latvia from March 9 to 15. The Division II tournament was held in Lecco, Italy from March 31 to April 6.

This was the eighth edition of such a series of women's ice hockey world championship tournaments.

== Top Division ==
Postponed, then cancelled. Groups for this division were seeded for 2004 based on the 2003 IIHF World Ranking instead of the normal practise of using their most recent finish.

== Division I ==
The Division I tournament was held in Ventspils, Latvia from March 9 to 15.

Team	Pld	W	D	L	GF	GA	GD	Pts
Japan	5	5	0	0	23	6	+17	10
Kazakhstan	5	3	1	1	20	7	+13	7
Czech Republic	5	3	0	2	15	22	−7	6
France	5	2	1	2	9	9	0	5
Latvia	5	1	0	4	7	16	−9	2
North Korea	5	0	0	5	10	24	−14	0

Source: IIHF

Japan was promoted to the 2004 IIHF Women's World Championship.

09 March 2003	North Korea	2–6	Japan

09 March 2003	Latvia	1–6	Kazakhstan

09 March 2003	France	1–4	Czech Republic

10 March 2003	Kazakhstan	4–1	North Korea

10 March 2003	Japan	2–1	France

10 March 2003	Latvia	1–2	Czech Republic

12 March 2003	Kazakhstan	3–3	France

12 March 2003	Japan	8–3	Czech Republic

12 March 2003	Latvia	5–2	North Korea

13 March 2003	Czech Republic	0–7	Kazakhstan

13 March 2003	North Korea	0–3	France

13 March 2003	Latvia	0–5	Japan

15 March 2003	Czech Republic	6–5	North Korea

15 March 2003	Latvia	0–1	France

15 March 2003	Kazakhstan	0–2	Japan

=== Statistics ===
==== Scoring leaders ====
Player	GP	G	A	Pts	PIM	+/-
(Kazakhstan) Natalya Yakovchuk	5	7	4	11	2	8
(Kazakhstan) Yekaterina Maltseva	5	5	6	11	2	8
(Japan) Hanae Kubo	5	5	5	10	10	7
(Japan) Yuki Togawa	5	4	4	8	6	4
(Czech Republic) Drahomira Fialova	5	6	0	6	2	−4
(Japan) Masako Sato	5	3	3	6	0	6
(Czech Republic) Zuzana Kralova	5	3	3	6	6	1
(North Korea) Hong Pong Hwa	5	2	4	6	5	1
(Kazakhstan) Yelena Shtelmaister	5	1	5	6	2	8
(North Korea) Choe Jong Sun	5	4	1	5	4	−1

==== Goaltending leaders ====
Player	Mins	GA	SOG	GAA	SV%
(Japan) Yuka Oda	280:24	6	128	1.28	95.31
(Kazakhstan) Natalya Trunova	299:56	7	136	1.40	94.85
(France) Nolwenn Rousselle	299:50	9	144	1.80	93.75
(Latvia) Lolita Andrisevska	279:11	16	163	3.44	90.18
(Czech Republic) Radka Lhotska	213:46	13	86	3.65	84.88

== Division II ==
Division II tournament was held in Lecco, Italy from March 31 to April 6.

Team	Pld	W	D	L	GF	GA	GD	Pts
Norway	5	4	1	0	24	9	+15	9
Denmark	5	3	1	1	16	13	+3	7
Slovakia	5	2	2	1	23	7	+16	6
Italy	5	2	0	3	13	21	−8	4
Netherlands	5	1	1	3	8	18	−10	3
Great Britain	5	0	1	4	12	28	−16	1

Source: IIHF

Norway is promoted to the 2004 Division I tournament.

31 March 2003	Great Britain	1–8	Slovakia

31 March 2003	Denmark	4–1	Netherlands

31 March 2003	Italy	2–4	Norway

01 April 2003	Slovakia	1–2	Denmark

01 April 2003	Netherlands	0–3	Italy

01 April 2003	Norway	8–3	Great Britain

03 April 2003	Great Britain	4–4	Denmark

03 April 2003	Netherlands	1–7	Norway

03 April 2003	Slovakia	10–0	Italy

04 April 2003	Norway	2–2	Slovakia

04 April 2003	Denmark	5–4	Italy

04 April 2003	Netherlands	4–2	Great Britain

06 April 2003	Slovakia	2–2	Netherlands

06 April 2003	Norway	3–1	Denmark

06 April 2003	Italy	4–2	Great Britain

=== Statistics ===
==== Scoring leaders ====
Player	GP	G	A	Pts	PIM	+/-
(Slovakia) Nikoleta Celarova	5	5	3	8	6	6
(Denmark) Tine Christoffersen Perry	5	3	4	7	16	7
(Denmark) Sofie Lund	5	5	1	6	0	7
(Norway) Line Bialik Olen	5	5	1	6	2	6
(Norway) Helene Martinsen	5	4	2	6	4	3
(Italy) Sabina Florian	5	4	2	6	4	0
(Norway) Hege Ask	5	4	2	6	6	6
(Slovakia) Ivana Gajdosova	5	2	4	6	6	2
(United Kingdom) Angela Taylor	5	4	1	5	12	1
(Slovakia) Zuzana Moravčíková	5	3	2	5	2	6
(Norway) Trine Martens	5	3	2	5	2	4

==== Goaltending leaders ====
Player	Mins	GA	SOG	GAA	SV%
(Slovakia) Zuzana Tomcikova	150:07	3	71	1.20	95.77
(Netherlands) Helena Kysela	179:44	6	96	2.00	93.75
(Slovakia) Andrea Risova	149:23	4	61	1.61	93.44
(Norway) Line Kuvas	240:00	8	119	2.00	93.28
(Denmark) Birgitte Andersen	296:27	12	133	2.43	90.98

== Division III ==
The Division III tournament was held in Maribor, Slovenia from March 25 to 31.

Team	Pld	W	D	L	GF	GA	GD	Pts
Australia	5	4	1	0	34	7	+27	9
Slovenia	5	3	2	0	20	8	+12	8
Belgium	5	2	1	2	10	12	−2	5
Hungary	5	1	1	3	5	14	−9	3
South Africa	5	1	1	3	7	23	−16	3
Romania	5	1	0	4	11	23	−12	2

Source: IIHF

Australia is promoted to the 2004 Division II tournament.

25 March 2003	Hungary	0–2	Belgium

25 March 2003	Romania	6–1	South Africa

25 March 2003	Slovenia	4–4	Australia

26 March 2003	Australia	7–0	Hungary

26 March 2003	Belgium	3–1	Romania

26 March 2003	Slovenia	6–1	South Africa

28 March 2003	Belgium	1–3	South Africa

28 March 2003	Australia	9–1	Romania

28 March 2003	Slovenia	1–0	Hungary

29 March 2003	South Africa	0–8	Australia

29 March 2003	Hungary	3–2	Romania

29 March 2003	Slovenia	2–2	Belgium

31 March 2003	South Africa	2–2	Hungary

31 March 2003	Australia	6–2	Belgium

31 March 2003	Slovenia	7–1	Romania

=== Statistics ===
==== Scoring leaders ====
Player	GP	G	A	Pts	PIM	+/-
(Slovenia) Jasmina Rosar	5	8	8	16	4	11
(Australia) Stephanie Boxall	5	9	6	15	0	20
(Slovenia) Ina Prezelj	5	6	5	11	6	11
(Australia) Melissa Bibby	5	7	2	9	4	14
(Slovenia) Anja Erzen	5	4	2	6	0	10
(Romania) Magdolna Dobandi	5	3	2	5	0	1
(Australia) Rachel White	5	3	2	5	2	7
(South Africa) Nadia Kemp	5	3	2	5	2	−7
(Australia) Lisa McMahon	5	2	3	5	2	5
(Belgium) Leen De Decker	5	3	1	4	4	1

==== Goaltending leaders ====
Player	Mins	GA	SOG	GAA	SV%
(Australia) Ashleigh Sluga	120:00	1	24	0.50	95.83
(Hungary) Eszter Kokenyesi	260:00	10	161	2.31	93.79
(Belgium) Celine Massez	279:48	11	141	2.36	92.20
(Slovenia) Urska Potocnik	280:00	8	93	1.71	91.40
(Australia) Emma Reid	180:00	6	50	2.00	88.00
