= 2004 IIHF Women's World Championship =

Tournament details
- Host country: Canada
- Venues: 2 (in 2 host cities)
- Dates: March 30 – April 6, 2004
- Opened by: Adrienne Clarkson
- Teams: 9

Final positions
- Champions: Canada (8th title)
- Runners-up: United States
- Third place: Finland
- Fourth place: Sweden

Tournament statistics
- Games played: 20
- Goals scored: 129 (6.45 per game)
- Attendance: 89,461 (4,473 per game)
- Scoring leader: (Canada) Jennifer Botterill (11 points)

Awards
- MVP: Jennifer Botterill

The 2004 IIHF Women's World Championship was the eighth edition of the Top Division of the Women's Ice Hockey World Championship (the ninth edition overall, if the season when only the lower divisions were played is also counted).

The Top Division tournament was held from March 30 to April 6, 2004 in Halifax and Dartmouth, Canada at the Halifax Metro Centre (now known as Scotiabank Centre), and the Dartmouth Sportsplex (now known as Zatzman Sportsplex). The Canadian national women's hockey team won their eighth straight World Championships. The event had 9 teams, because the 2003 event was cancelled due to the SARS epidemic, therefore no teams were relegated and the winners of the 2002 and 2003 Division I tournaments qualified. Canada won their 37th consecutive World Championship game before losing 3–1 in their third game. They later avenged their loss to the US by defeating them in the gold medal game 2–1. Sweden and Finland also met each other twice, with Finland winning the bronze medal game 3–2 improving on the earlier draw.

In addition to being the qualifications for the 2005 world tournaments, this year also finalized the qualification for the 2006 Winter Olympics.

== Top Division ==
=== Preliminary round ===
==== Group A ====
Pos	Team	Pld	W	D	L	GF	GA	GD	Pts	Qualification
1	Canada (H)	2	2	0	0	24	0	+24	4	Group D
2	Germany	2	1	0	1	4	15	−11	2	Group E
3	China	2	0	0	2	2	15	−13	0	Group F

(H) Hosts

30 March 2004; 20:00	China	0–11 (0–4, 0–3, 0–4)	Canada	Halifax Metro Centre, Halifax; Attendance: 5,447

Game reference
8 min	Penalties	12 min
12	Shots	52

31 March 2004; 20:00	Germany	4–2 (0–1, 1–1, 3–0)	China	Halifax Metro Centre, Halifax; Attendance: 3,507

Game reference
16 min	Penalties	14 min
38	Shots	24

1 April 2004; 20:00	Canada	13–0 (8–0, 3–0, 2–0)	Germany	Halifax Metro Centre, Halifax; Attendance: 7,251

Game reference
4 min	Penalties	10 min
64	Shots	9

==== Group B ====
Pos	Team	Pld	W	D	L	GF	GA	GD	Pts	Qualification
1	United States	2	2	0	0	17	1	+16	4	Group D
2	Russia	2	1	0	1	2	9	−7	2	Group E
3	Switzerland	2	0	0	2	2	11	−9	0	Group F

30 March 2004; 16:00	Switzerland	1–9 (1–1, 0–4, 0–4)	United States	Halifax Metro Centre, Halifax; Attendance: 4,900

Game reference
6 min	Penalties	14 min
11	Shots	50

31 March 2004; 16:00	Russia	2–1 (1–0, 1–0, 0–1)	Switzerland	Halifax Metro Centre, Halifax; Attendance: 3,274

Game reference
10 min	Penalties	14 min
33	Shots	27

1 April 2004; 16:00	United States	8–0 (2–0, 2–0, 4–0)	Russia	Halifax Metro Centre, Halifax; Attendance: 6,185

Game reference
8 min	Penalties	10 min
68	Shots	4

==== Group C ====
Pos	Team	Pld	W	D	L	GF	GA	GD	Pts	Qualification
1	Sweden	2	1	1	0	10	4	+6	3	Group D
2	Finland	2	1	1	0	3	2	+1	3	Group E
3	Japan	2	0	0	2	2	9	−7	0	Group F

30 March 2004; 18:00	Japan	2–8 (0–2, 2–4, 0–2)	Sweden	Dartmouth Sportsplex, Dartmouth; Attendance: 1,238

Game reference
12 min	Penalties	22 min
10	Shots	39

31 March 2004; 18:00	Finland	1–0 (1–0, 0–0, 0–0)	Japan	Dartmouth Sportsplex, Dartmouth; Attendance: 1,221

Game reference
14 min	Penalties	12 min
27	Shots	11

1 April 2004; 18:00	Sweden	2–2 (2–0, 0–1, 0–1)	Finland	Dartmouth Sportsplex, Dartmouth; Attendance: 1,412

Game reference
16 min	Penalties	14 min
23	Shots	20

=== Qualifying round ===
==== Group D ====
Pos	Team	Pld	W	D	L	GF	GA	GD	Pts	Qualification
1	United States	2	2	0	0	12	3	+9	4	Final
2	Canada (H)	2	1	0	1	8	4	+4	2	Final
3	Sweden	2	0	0	2	3	16	−13	0	Bronze medal game

(H) Hosts

3 April 2004; 16:10	Canada	1–3 (1–2, 0–1, 0–0)	United States	Halifax Metro Centre, Halifax; Attendance: 8,505

Game reference
10 min	Penalties	10 min
27	Shots	24

4 April 2004; 20:10	Sweden	1–7 (1–0, 0–4, 0–3)	Canada	Halifax Metro Centre, Halifax; Attendance: 5,816

Game reference
26 min	Penalties	16 min
13	Shots	54

5 April 2004; 20:00	United States	9–2 (3–1, 1–1, 5–0)	Sweden	Halifax Metro Centre, Halifax; Attendance: 4,972

Game reference
2 min	Penalties	16 min
45	Shots	15

==== Group E ====
Pos	Team	Pld	W	D	L	GF	GA	GD	Pts	Qualification
4	Finland	2	2	0	0	6	1	+5	4	Bronze medal game
5	Russia	2	1	0	1	5	4	+1	2	
6	Germany	2	0	0	2	2	8	−6	0	

3 April 2004; 20:00	Germany	2–4 (0–1, 2–2, 0–1)	Russia	Halifax Metro Centre, Halifax; Attendance: 4,144

Game reference
4 min	Penalties	4 min
26	Shots	34

4 April 2004; 16:00	Finland	4–0 (2–0, 1–0, 1–0)	Germany	Halifax Metro Centre, Halifax; Attendance: 6,599

Game reference
8 min	Penalties	14 min
33	Shots	17

5 April 2004; 16:00	Russia	1–2 (1–0, 0–2, 0–0)	Finland	Halifax Metro Centre, Halifax; Attendance: 5,976

Game reference
2 min	Penalties	6 min
13	Shots	34

==== Group F ====
Pos	Team	Pld	W	D	L	GF	GA	GD	Pts	Relegation
7	China	2	2	0	0	11	5	+6	4	
8	Switzerland	2	1	0	1	7	6	+1	2	Relegation to 2005 Division I
9	Japan	2	0	0	2	2	9	−7	0	Relegation to 2005 Division I

3 April 2004; 18:00	China	6–3 (2–1, 3–1, 1–1)	Switzerland	Dartmouth Sportsplex, Dartmouth; Attendance: 1,197

Game reference
10 min	Penalties	8 min
21	Shots	44

4 April 2004; 18:00	Japan	2–5 (0–2, 0–1, 2–2)	China	Dartmouth Sportsplex, Dartmouth; Attendance: 1,205

Game reference
2 min	Penalties	8 min
33	Shots	38

5 April 2004; 18:00	Switzerland	4–0 (0–0, 1–0, 3–0)	Japan	Dartmouth Sportsplex, Dartmouth; Attendance: 996

Game reference
14 min	Penalties	18 min
22	Shots	17

=== Final round ===
==== Bronze medal game ====
6 April 2004; 16:00	Finland	3–2 (1–0, 1–2, 1–0)	Sweden	Halifax Metro Centre, Halifax; Attendance: 5,111

Game reference

Heidi Wiik
Goalies
Kim Martin
Referee:
(Canada) Stephanie Normand
Linesmen:
(United States) Kelli O'Brian
(Canada) Christine Pellerin

Sirviö (Hoikkala, Savikuja) – 18:36	1–0
	1–1	25:56 – Holst (Rooth, Holmlöv) (PP)
Fisk (Riipi, Kovalainen) – 27:04	2–1
	2–2	27:57 – Edstrand (Sjölander)
Saarinen – 48:49	3–2

6 min
Penalties
12 min
24
Shots
17

==== Final ====
6 April 2004; 20:10	United States	0–2 (0–0, 0–1, 0–1)	Canada	Halifax Metro Centre, Halifax; Attendance: 10,506

Game reference
Pam Dreyer	Goalies	Kim St-Pierre	Referee: (Finland) Anu Hirvonen; Linesmen: (Netherlands) Ilse Robben (Finland) Johanna Suban
0–1 / 24:17 – Wickenheiser (Goyette, Brisson); 0–2 / 41:37 – Collins			Referee: (Finland) Anu Hirvonen; Linesmen: (Netherlands) Ilse Robben (Finland) Johanna Suban
12 min	Penalties	8 min	Referee: (Finland) Anu Hirvonen; Linesmen: (Netherlands) Ilse Robben (Finland) Johanna Suban
26	Shots	27	Referee: (Finland) Anu Hirvonen; Linesmen: (Netherlands) Ilse Robben (Finland) Johanna Suban

=== Final standings ===
1st place, gold medalist(s)	Canada
2nd place, silver medalist(s)	United States
3rd place, bronze medalist(s)	Finland
4	Sweden
5	Russia
6	Germany
7	China
8	Switzerland
9	Japan

=== Awards and statistics ===
==== Scoring leaders ====
Pos	Player	Country	GP	G	A	Pts	+/−	PIM
1	Jennifer Botterill	Canada	5	3	8	11	+8	0
2	Natalie Darwitz	United States	5	7	3	10	+7	2
2	Jayna Hefford	Canada	5	7	3	10	+6	2
4	Caroline Ouellette	Canada	5	3	6	9	+10	0
5	Krissy Wendell	United States	4	4	3	7	+7	0
6	Angela Ruggiero	United States	5	2	5	7	+9	2
6	Danielle Goyette	Canada	5	2	5	7	+7	6
8	Cherie Piper	Canada	5	1	6	7	+7	4
9	Jenny Potter	United States	5	3	3	6	+6	4
10	Katie King	United States	5	2	4	6	+6	2
10	Elin Holmlöv	Sweden	5	2	4	6	−1	8

GP = Games played; G = Goals; A = Assists; Pts = Points; +/− = P Plus–minus; PIM = Penalties In Minutes
Source: IIHF.com

==== Goaltending leaders ====
(minimum 40% team's total ice time)

Pos	Player	Country	TOI	GA	GAA	Sv%	SO
1	Kim St. Pierre	Canada	179:44	3	1.00	95.16	2
2	Pam Dreyer	United States	158:39	4	1.51	92.86	0
2	Chanda Gunn	United States	139:18	2	0.86	92.86	2
4	Florence Schelling	Switzerland	166:14	5	1.80	92.42	1
5	Heidi Wiik	Finland	240:00	5	1.25	92.19	1

TOI = Time on ice (minutes:seconds); GA = Goals against; GAA = Goals against average; Sv% = Save percentage; SO = Shutouts
Source: IIHF.com

==== Directorate Awards ====
- Goaltender: (Canada) Kim St. Pierre
- Defenceman: (United States) Angela Ruggiero
- Forward: (Canada) Jayna Hefford
- Most Valuable Player: (Canada) Jennifer Botterill

==== All-Star team ====
- Goaltender: (United States) Pam Dreyer
- Defencemen: (Sweden) Gunilla Andersson, (United States) Angela Ruggiero
- Forwards: (Canada) Jennifer Botterill, (United States) Natalie Darwitz, (Canada) Jayna Hefford

== Division I ==
The Division I IIHF World Women's Championships were held March 14–20, 2004 in Ventspils, Latvia

Team	Pld	W	D	L	GF	GA	GD	Pts
Kazakhstan	5	4	1	0	15	4	+11	9
Czech Republic	5	3	1	1	19	11	+8	7
Latvia	5	3	1	1	18	15	+3	7
France	5	1	2	2	14	13	+1	4
Norway	5	1	1	3	18	17	+1	3
North Korea	5	0	0	5	5	29	−24	0

Kazakhstan is promoted to the 2005 Women's World Ice Hockey Championships, Norway and North Korea are demoted to Division II

14 March 2004	Norway	3–3	France

Game reference

14 March 2004	Latvia	1–4	Czech Republic

Game reference

14 March 2004	North Korea	1–4	Kazakhstan

Game reference

15 March 2004	Czech Republic	4–3	Norway

Game reference

15 March 2004	France	6–0	North Korea

Game reference

15 March 2004	Kazakhstan	3–3	Latvia

Game reference

17 March 2004	Kazakhstan	1–0	Norway

Game reference

17 March 2004	Czech Republic	3–3	France

Game reference

17 March 2004	North Korea	1–4	Latvia

Game reference

18 March 2004	France	0–4	Kazakhstan

Game reference

18 March 2004	Czech Republic	8–1	North Korea

Game reference

18 March 2004	Latvia	7–5	Norway

Game reference

20 March 2004	Norway	7–2	North Korea

Game reference

20 March 2004	France	2–3	Latvia

Game reference

20 March 2004	Kazakhstan	3–0	Czech Republic

Game reference

=== Awards and statistics ===
==== Directorate Awards ====
- Goalie: Yelena Kuznetsova, (Kazakhstan)
- Defender: Olga Konysheva, (Kazakhstan)
- Forward: Iveta Koka, (Latvia)

Source: Passionhockey.com

==== Scoring leaders ====
Pos	Player	Country	GP	G	A	Pts	+/−	PIM
1	Hege Ask	Norway	5	5	3	8	0	2
2	Iveta Koka	Latvia	5	2	6	8	+7	2
3	Drahomíra Fialová	Czech Republic	5	4	2	6	+3	2
3	Eva Holešova	Czech Republic	5	4	2	6	−1	4
3	Zuzana Králová	Czech Republic	5	4	2	6	+5	4
3	Christine Duchamp	France	5	4	2	6	−1	10
7	Lyubov Alexeyeva	Kazakhstan	5	3	3	6	+10	4
8	Inese Geca-Miljone	Latvia	5	5	0	5	+5	4
9	Olga Potapova	Kazakhstan	5	4	1	5	+10	4
10	Helene Martinsen	Norway	5	4	1	5	+3	14

GP = Games played; G = Goals; A = Assists; Pts = Points; +/− = P Plus–minus; PIM = Penalties In Minutes
Source: IIHF.com

==== Goaltending leaders ====
(minimum 40% team's total ice time)

Pos	Player	Country	TOI	GA	GAA	Sv%	SO
1	Yelena Kuznetsova	Kazakhstan	298:57	4	0.80	95.70	3
2	Radka Lhotská	Czech Republic	180:00	5	1.67	93.06	0
3	Lolita Andriševska	Latvia	300:00	14	2.80	92.86	0
3	Nolwenn Rousselle	France	300:00	11	2.20	92.86	1
5	Petra Šmardová	Czech Republic	120:00	4	2.00	91.49	0

TOI = Time on ice (minutes:seconds); GA = Goals against; GAA = Goals against average; Sv% = Save percentage; SO = Shutouts
Source: IIHF.com

== Division II ==
The Division II IIHF World Women's Championships will be held March 14–20, 2004 in Sterzing, Italy

Team	Pld	W	D	L	GF	GA	GD	Pts
Denmark	5	4	1	0	24	7	+17	9
Italy	5	4	0	1	24	7	+17	8
Slovakia	5	3	1	1	28	7	+21	7
Netherlands	5	2	0	3	8	14	−6	4
Australia	5	1	0	4	6	32	−26	2
Great Britain	5	0	0	5	6	29	−23	0

Denmark is promoted to Division I while Australia and Great Britain are demoted to Division III in the 2005 Women's World Ice Hockey Championships

14 March 2004	Netherlands	1–5	Slovakia

14 March 2004	Great Britain	2–3	Denmark

14 March 2004	Italy	7–0	Australia

15 March 2004	Denmark	4–1	Netherlands

15 March 2004	Slovakia	8–1	Australia

15 March 2004	Italy	10–2	Great Britain

17 March 2004	Denmark	10–0	Australia

17 March 2004	Great Britain	0–1	Netherlands

17 March 2004	Italy	2–1	Slovakia

18 March 2004	Netherlands	5–1	Australia

18 March 2004	Slovakia	11–0	Great Britain

18 March 2004	Italy	1–4	Denmark

20 March 2004	Denmark	3–3	Slovakia

20 March 2004	Australia	4–2	Great Britain

20 March 2004	Italy	4–0	Netherlands

=== Awards and statistics ===
==== Directorate Awards ====
- Goalie: (Slovakia) Zuzana Tomčíková
- Defender: (Slovakia) Jana Kapustová
- Forward: (Italy) Maria Leitner

Source: Passionhockey.com

==== Scoring leaders ====
Pos	Player	Country	GP	G	A	Pts	+/−	PIM
1	Nicole Bona	Italy	5	3	9	12	+7	8
2	Maria Leitner	Italy	5	7	4	11	+10	2
3	Tine Perry	Denmark	5	5	5	10	+3	6
4	Marie Henriksen	Denmark	5	3	7	10	+7	0
5	Sofie Lund	Denmark	5	8	1	9	+4	2
6	Sabina Florian	Italy	5	6	1	7	+6	6
7	Martina Veličková	Slovakia	5	5	2	7	+5	2
8	Zuzana Moravčíková	Slovakia	5	4	2	6	+10	2
9	Natalie Babonyová	Slovakia	5	3	3	6	+5	6
10	Maria Olausson	Denmark	5	5	0	5	+7	2

GP = Games played; G = Goals; A = Assists; Pts = Points; +/− = P Plus–minus; PIM = Penalties In Minutes
Source: IIHF.com

==== Goaltending leaders ====
(minimum 40% team's total ice time)

Pos	Player	Country	TOI	GA	GAA	Sv%	SO
1	Andrea Risova	Slovakia	120:00	1	0.50	95.00	1
2	Debora Montanari	Italy	247:10	4	0.97	94.81	3
3	Camilla Bedmar	Denmark	240:00	6	1.50	93.18	1
4	Helena Kysela	Netherlands	300:00	13	2.60	93.16	1
5	Vicky Robbins	Great Britain	245:39	19	4.54	91.88	0

TOI = Time on ice (minutes:seconds); GA = Goals against; GAA = Goals against average; Sv% = Save percentage; SO = Shutouts
Source: IIHF.com

== Division III ==
The Division III IIHF Women World Championships were held March 21–28, 2004 in Maribor, Slovenia.

Team	Pld	W	D	L	GF	GA	GD	Pts
Austria	5	5	0	0	35	4	+31	10
Slovenia	5	4	0	1	28	8	+20	8
Hungary	5	3	0	2	15	20	−5	6
Belgium	5	2	0	3	13	19	−6	4
Romania	5	1	0	4	4	21	−17	2
South Korea	5	0	0	5	7	30	−23	0

Austria was promoted to Division II at the 2005 Women's World Ice Hockey Championships, while both Romania and South Korea were relegated to the newly formed Division IV.

21 March 2004	Austria	8–1	Hungary

21 March 2004	South Korea	1–2	Belgium

21 March 2004	Slovenia	5–0	Romania

22 March 2004	Belgium	1–10	Austria

22 March 2004	Hungary	3–0	Romania

22 March 2004	Slovenia	10–1	South Korea

24 March 2004	Romania	4–3	South Korea

24 March 2004	Belgium	3–4	Hungary

24 March 2004	Slovenia	1–3	Austria

25 March 2004	Belgium	6–0	Romania

25 March 2004	South Korea	1–10	Austria

25 March 2004	Slovenia	8–3	Hungary

27 March 2004	Hungary	4–1	South Korea

27 March 2004	Austria	4–0	Romania

27 March 2004	Slovenia	4–1	Belgium

=== Awards and statistics ===
==== Directorate Awards ====
- Goalie: Nina Geyer, (Austria)
- Defender: Kerstin Oberhuber, (Austria)
- Forward: Jasmina Rosar, (Slovenia)

Source: Passionhockey.com

==== Scoring leaders ====
Pos	Player	Country	GP	G	A	Pts	+/−	PIM
1	Jasmina Rošar	Slovenia	5	11	6	17	+9	8
2	Ina Prezelj	Slovenia	5	9	8	17	+9	4
3	Denise Altmann	Austria	5	6	5	11	+14	10
4	Eva Maria Schwarzler	Austria	5	6	3	9	+14	2
5	Pia Pren	Slovenia	5	4	3	7	+9	2
6	Esther Kantor	Austria	5	3	3	6	+10	4
7	Cacilia Reichel	Austria	5	3	3	6	+9	0
8	Sonja Ban	Austria	5	4	1	5	+10	0
8	Kerstin Oberhuber	Austria	5	4	1	5	+12	2
8	Edit Darányi	Hungary	5	4	1	5	+1	6
8	Tímea Tóvölgyi	Hungary	5	4	1	5	+1	2

GP = Games played; G = Goals; A = Assists; Pts = Points; +/− = P Plus–minus; PIM = Penalties In Minutes
Source: [ IIHF.com]

==== Goaltending leaders ====
Player	Mins	GA	SOG	GAA	SV%
(Austria) Nina Geyer	151:13	2	58	0.79	96.55
(Slovenia) Hedvika Korbar	239:30	3	64	0.75	95.31
(Romania) Beata Antal	293:13	18	231	3.68	92.21
(Austria) Doris Abele	148:47	2	24	0.81	91.67
(Hungary) Eszter Kökényesi	280:00	15	142	3.21	89.44
