= 2005 IIHF Women's World Championship =

Tournament details
- Host country: Sweden
- Venues: 2 (in 2 host cities)
- Dates: April 2–9, 2005
- Opened by: Carl XVI Gustaf
- Teams: 8

Final positions
- Champions: United States (1st title)
- Runners-up: Canada
- Third place: Sweden
- Fourth place: Finland

Tournament statistics
- Games played: 20
- Goals scored: 121 (6.05 per game)
- Attendance: 21,436 (1,072 per game)
- Scoring leader: (United States) Krissy Wendell (9 points)

Awards
- MVP: (United States) Krissy Wendell

The 2005 IIHF Women's World Championship was the ninth edition of the Top Division of the Women's Ice Hockey World Championship (the tenth edition overall, if the season when only the lower divisions were played is also counted).

The Top Division tournament was held from April 2 to 9, 2005, in Linköping, at Cloetta Center (now called the Saab Arena), and Norrköping, at Himmelstalundshallen, in Sweden. The United States won their first gold medal at the World Championships, after defeated Canada in a penalty shootout. Sweden won their first medal at the World Women's Championships, defeating Finland 5–2 in the bronze medal game. The championship was expanded to nine teams in 2006, so there was no relegation at any level.

== Top Division ==
=== Preliminary round ===
==== Group A ====
Pos	Team	Pld	W	D	L	GF	GA	GD	Pts	Qualification
1	Canada	3	3	0	0	35	0	+35	6	Semifinals
2	Sweden (H)	3	2	0	1	8	12	−4	4	Semifinals
3	Russia	3	0	1	2	3	17	−14	1	5–8th place semifinals
4	Kazakhstan	3	0	1	2	3	20	−17	1	5–8th place semifinals

Source: IIHF
(H) Hosts

2 April 2005; 15:30	Sweden	3–1 (0–0, 2–1, 1–0)	Russia	Cloetta Center, Linköping; Attendance: 2,252

Game reference
6 min	Penalties	6 min
28	Shots	14

3 April 2005; 20:00	Canada	13–0 (4–0, 6–0, 3–0)	Kazakhstan	Cloetta Center, Linköping; Attendance: 1,103

Game reference
10 min	Penalties	12 min
55	Shots	2

4 April 2005; 20:00	Russia	0–12 (0–1, 0–4, 0–7)	Canada	Cloetta Center, Linköping; Attendance: 1,098

Game reference
16 min	Penalties	12 min
7	Shots	46

4 April 2005; 20:00	Sweden	5–1 (0–0, 0–0, 5–1)	Kazakhstan	Himmelstalundshallen, Norrköping; Attendance: 461

Game reference
10 min	Penalties	10 min
76	Shots	5

6 April 2005; 16:00	Kazakhstan	2–2 (1–1, 0–1, 1–0)	Russia	Cloetta Center, Linköping; Attendance: 954

Game reference
14 min	Penalties	8 min
21	Shots	33

6 April 2005; 20:00	Canada	10–0 (3–0, 4–0, 3–0)	Sweden	Cloetta Center, Linköping; Attendance: 2,513

Game reference
14 min	Penalties	22 min
44	Shots	14

==== Group B ====
Pos	Team	Pld	W	D	L	GF	GA	GD	Pts	Qualification
1	United States	3	3	0	0	23	3	+20	6	Semifinals
2	Finland	3	2	0	1	11	10	+1	4	Semifinals
3	China	3	0	1	2	6	16	−10	1	5–8th place semifinals
4	Germany	3	0	1	2	4	15	−11	1	5–8th place semifinals

Source: IIHF

3 April 2005; 16:00	United States	8–2 (4–1, 2–0, 2–1)	China	Himmelstalundshallen, Norrköping; Attendance: 214

Game reference
16 min	Penalties	6 min
79	Shots	14

3 April 2005; 20:00	Finland	5–1 (3–0, 2–0, 0–1)	Germany	Himmelstalundshallen, Norrköping

Game reference
10 min	Penalties	12 min
48	Shots	21

5 April 2005; 20:00	Germany	0–7 (0–5, 0–1, 0–1)	United States	Cloetta Center, Linköping; Attendance: 1,008

Game reference
8 min	Penalties	16 min
15	Shots	37

5 April 2005; 20:00	Finland	5–1 (0–0, 4–1, 1–0)	China	Himmelstalundshallen, Norrköping; Attendance: 210

Game reference
16 min	Penalties	14 min
43	Shots	14

6 April 2005; 16:00	China	3–3 (1–1, 0–2, 2–0)	Germany	Himmelstalundshallen, Norrköping; Attendance: 87

Game reference
16 min	Penalties	12 min
29	Shots	35

6 April 2005; 20:00	United States	8–1 (2–0, 3–0, 3–1)	Finland	Himmelstalundshallen, Norrköping; Attendance: 300

Game reference
18 min	Penalties	12 min
47	Shots	12

=== Placement round ===
==== Bracket ====
5–8th place semifinals
8 April
Russia	1
Germany	2
8 April
China	3
Kazakhstan	0

Fifth place
9 April
Germany	3
China	0
Seventh place
9 April
Russia	1
Kazakhstan (GWS)	2

==== 5–8th place semifinals ====
8 April 2005; 15:00	China	3–0 (1–0, 1–0, 1–0)	Kazakhstan	Himmelstalundshallen, Norrköping; Attendance: 42

Game reference
6 min	Penalties	16 min
35	Shots	14

8 April 2005; 15:00	Russia	1–2 (1–1, 0–1, 0–0)	Germany	Himmelstalundshallen, Norrköping; Attendance: 60

Game reference
6 min	Penalties	6 min
24	Shots	26

==== Seventh place game ====
9 April 2005; 15:00	Russia	1–2 GWS (1–0, 0–1, 0–0) (OT: 0–0) (SO: 0–1)	Kazakhstan	Himmelstalundshallen, Norrköping; Attendance: 50

Game reference
8 min	Penalties	10 min
46	Shots	19

==== Fifth place game ====
9 April 2005; 19:00	Germany	3–0 (1–0, 1–0, 1–0)	China	Himmelstalundshallen, Norrköping; Attendance: 65

Game reference
6 min	Penalties	10 min
39	Shots	19

=== Final round ===
==== Bracket ====
Semifinals
8 April
Canada	3
Finland	0
8 April
United States	4
Sweden	1

Final
9 April
Canada	0
United States (GWS)	1
Third place
9 April
Finland	2
Sweden	5

==== Semifinals ====
8 April 2005; 16:00	Canada	3–0 (0–0, 2–0, 1–0)	Finland	Cloetta Center, Linköping; Attendance: 1,648

Game reference
12 min	Penalties	8 min
41	Shots	16

8 April 2005; 20:00	United States	4–1 (0–1, 3–0, 1–0)	Sweden	Cloetta Center, Linköping; Attendance: 2,192

Game reference
12 min	Penalties	10 min
31	Shots	14

==== Bronze medal game ====
9 April 2005; 15:30	Finland	2–5 (1–1, 1–0, 0–4)	Sweden	Cloetta Center, Linköping; Attendance: 2,536

Game reference

Anna-Kaisa Piiroinen
Goalies
Kim Martin
Cecilia Andersson

	0–1	00:24 – Rooth
Hoikkala (PP) – 15:58	1–1
Sirviö (Rantamäki) – 25:21	2–1
	2–2	43:52 – Vikman (Sjölander) (PP)
	2–3	48:04 – O'Konor (G. Andersson) (PP)
	2–4	55:08 – Holst (Holmlöv) (SH)
	2–5	59:46 – Rooth (ENG)

14 min
Penalties
20 min
33
Shots
29

==== Final ====
9 April 2005; 19:00	Canada	0–1 GWS (0–0, 0–0, 0–0) (OT: 0–0) (SO: 0–1)	United States	Cloetta Center, Linköping; Attendance: 4,468

Game reference
Kim St-Pierre	Goalies	Chanda Gunn
	Shootout	Ruggiero
6 min	Penalties	6 min
26	Shots	50

=== Final standings ===
Rank	Team
1st place, gold medalist(s)	United States
2nd place, silver medalist(s)	Canada
3rd place, bronze medalist(s)	Sweden
4	Finland
5	Germany
6	China
7	Kazakhstan
8	Russia

=== Awards and statistics ===
==== Scoring leaders ====
Pos	Player	Country	GP	G	A	Pts	+/−	PIM
1	Krissy Wendell	United States	5	4	5	9	+9	0
2	Jayna Hefford	Canada	5	6	2	8	+7	0
3	Hayley Wickenheiser	Canada	5	5	3	8	+8	6
4	Sarah Vaillancourt	Canada	5	3	5	8	+10	0
5	Caroline Ouellette	Canada	5	2	6	8	+7	0
6	Kelly Stephens	United States	5	3	4	7	+7	16
7	Jennifer Botterill	Canada	5	1	6	7	+6	4
8	Gillian Apps	Canada	5	4	2	6	+7	8
9	Satu Hoikkala	Finland	5	3	3	6	−2	6
9	Angela Ruggiero	United States	5	3	3	6	+12	10

GP = Games played; G = Goals; A = Assists; Pts = Points; +/− = P Plus–minus; PIM = Penalties In Minutes
Source: IIHF.com

==== Goaltending leaders ====
(minimum 40% team's total ice time)

Pos	Player	Country	TOI	GA	GAA	Sv%	SO
1	Kim St. Pierre	Canada	200:00	1	0.30	98.48	2
2	Chanda Gunn	United States	230:01	2	0.52	96.77	3
3	Stephanie Wartosch-Kürten	Germany	265:48	10	2.26	92.65	1
4	Natalya Trunova	Kazakhstan	279:27	19	4.08	91.12	0
5	Huo Lina	China	300:00	19	3.80	90.95	1

TOI = Time on ice (minutes:seconds); GA = Goals against; GAA = Goals against average; Sv% = Save percentage; SO = Shutouts
Source: IIHF.com

- Canadian goaltender Charline Labonté is listed first in the IIHF source, however they incorrectly list her as playing 40% of the teams minutes, she played 37.5%.

==== Directorate Awards ====
- Goaltender: (United States) Chanda Gunn
- Defenceman: (United States) Angela Ruggiero
- Forward: (Canada) Jayna Hefford

==== Media All-Stars ====
- Goaltender: (Kazakhstan) Natalya Trunova
- Defencemen: (United States) Angela Ruggiero, (Canada) Cheryl Pounder
- Forwards: (United States) Krissy Wendell, (Canada) Hayley Wickenheiser, (Sweden) Maria Rooth
- MVP: (United States) Krissy Wendell

== Division I ==
The Division I IIHF World Women's Championships was held March 27 – April 2, 2005 in Romanshorn, Switzerland

Team	Pld	W	D	L	GF	GA	GD	Pts
Switzerland	5	5	0	0	29	7	+22	10
Japan	5	4	0	1	18	8	+10	8
Czech Republic	5	2	1	2	13	9	+4	5
France	5	2	1	2	18	19	−1	5
Denmark	5	1	0	4	15	31	−16	2
Latvia	5	0	0	5	12	31	−19	0

Switzerland is promoted to the 2007 Women's World Ice Hockey Championships.

27 March 2005	France	2–2	Czech Republic

27 March 2005	Switzerland	11–0	Denmark

27 March 2005	Latvia	1–5	Japan

28 March 2005	Czech Republic	4–2	Denmark

28 March 2005	Japan	5–1	France

28 March 2005	Switzerland	5–2	Latvia

30 March 2005	Denmark	9–4	Latvia

30 March 2005	Japan	1–0	Czech Republic

30 March 2005	Switzerland	7–2	France

01 April 2005	Latvia	4–6	France

01 April 2005	Czech Republic	1–3	Switzerland

01 April 2005	Japan	5–3	Denmark

02 April 2005	Czech Republic	6–1	Latvia

02 April 2005	France	7–1	Denmark

02 April 2005	Switzerland	3–2	Japan

=== Statistics ===
==== Scoring leaders ====
Pos	Player	Country	GP	G	A	Pts	+/−	PIM
1	Hanae Kubo	Japan	5	5	3	8	+5	2
2	Stefanie Marty	Switzerland	5	4	3	7	+8	0
2	Christine Meier	Switzerland	5	4	3	7	+10	4
4	Sandra Cattaneo	Switzerland	5	3	4	7	+11	2
4	Kathrin Lehmann	Switzerland	5	3	4	7	+8	6
6	Fracoise Bidaud	France	5	5	1	6	+4	6
7	Daniela Diaz	Switzerland	5	3	3	6	+12	6
8	Inese Geca-Miljone	Latvia	5	4	1	5	−9	4
8	Beata Szelongova	Czech Republic	5	4	1	5	+3	4
10	Draha Fialova	Czech Republic	5	3	2	5	+1	4

GP = Games played; G = Goals; A = Assists; Pts = Points; +/− = P Plus–minus; PIM = Penalties In Minutes
Source: IIHF.com

==== Goaltending leaders ====
(minimum 40% team's total ice time)

Pos	Player	Country	TOI	GA	GAA	Sv%	SO
1	Patricia Elsmore-Sautter	Switzerland	240:00	5	1.25	95.05	1
2	Petra Smardova	Czech Republic	240:00	6	1.50	94.69	0
3	Azusa Nakaoku	Japan	178:30	4	1.34	94.03	1
4	Nolwenn Rousselle	France	137:13	6	2.62	90.91	0
5	Nanna Holm Glaas	Denmark	144:23	11	4.57	90.35	0

TOI = Time on ice (minutes:seconds); GA = Goals against; GAA = Goals against average; Sv% = Save percentage; SO = Shutouts
Source: IIHF.com

== Division II ==
The Division II IIHF World Women's Championships was held March 13–20, 2005 in Asiago, Italy

Team	Pld	W	D	L	GF	GA	GD	Pts
Norway	5	4	0	1	21	6	+15	8
Italy	5	4	0	1	21	7	+14	8
Slovakia	5	4	0	1	16	8	+8	8
North Korea	5	2	0	3	12	15	−3	4
Austria	5	1	0	4	10	24	−14	2
Netherlands	5	0	0	5	6	26	−20	0

Norway is promoted to Division I for the 2007 Women's World Ice Hockey Championships

14 March 2005	Slovakia	2–1	North Korea

14 March 2005	Austria	0–3	Norway

14 March 2005	Netherlands	0–5	Italy

15 March 2005	Norway	2–3	Slovakia

15 March 2005	North Korea	6–0	Netherlands

15 March 2005	Italy	6–1	Austria

17 March 2005	Norway	7–1	Netherlands

17 March 2005	Austria	1–8	Slovakia

17 March 2005	North Korea	1–6	Italy

18 March 2005	Slovakia	3–2	Netherlands

18 March 2005	North Korea	4–3	Austria

18 March 2005	Italy	2–5	Norway

20 March 2005	Norway	4–0	North Korea

20 March 2005	Netherlands	3–5	Austria

20 March 2005	Italy	2–0	Slovakia

=== Statistics ===
==== Scoring leaders ====
Pos	Player	Country	GP	G	A	Pts	+/−	PIM
1	Line Oien	Norway	5	8	3	11	+11	2
2	Maria Leitner	Italy	5	7	3	10	+6	0
3	Denise Altmann	Austria	5	5	4	9	−4	6
4	Federica Zandegiacomo	Italy	5	5	2	7	+3	10
5	Hege Ask	Norway	5	3	4	7	+10	6
6	Petra Pravlíková	Slovakia	5	4	2	6	+3	2
7	Waltraud Kaser	Italy	5	2	4	6	+6	0
7	Sabina Florian	Italy	5	2	4	6	+3	10
9	Trine Martens	Norway	5	2	3	5	+6	2
10	Marte Carlsson	Norway	5	2	2	4	+1	6
10	Petra Jurčová	Slovakia	5	2	2	4	+2	4
10	Kim Nong-gum	North Korea	5	2	2	4	0	4
10	Eva Maria Schwarzler	Austria	5	2	2	4	+1	4

GP = Games played; G = Goals; A = Assists; Pts = Points; +/− = P Plus–minus; PIM = Penalties In Minutes
Source: IIHF.com

==== Goaltending leaders ====
(minimum 40% team's total ice time)

Pos	Player	Country	TOI	GA	GAA	Sv%	SO
1	Debora Monanari	Italy	226:58	3	0.79	96.10	2
2	Christine Smestad	Norway	300:00	6	1.20	95.45	2
3	Zuzana Tomčíková	Slovakia	300:00	8	1.60	91.49	0
4	Hong Kum-sil	North Korea	300:00	15	3.00	87.50	1
5	Helena Kysela	Netherlands	227:25	17	4.49	87.22	0

TOI = Time on ice (minutes:seconds); GA = Goals against; GAA = Goals against average; Sv% = Save percentage; SO = Shutouts
Source: IIHF.com

== Division III ==
The Division III IIHF World Women's Championships was held March 3–9, 2005 in Cape Town, South Africa

Team	Pld	W	D	L	GF	GA	GD	Pts
Slovenia	5	5	0	0	41	8	+33	10
Great Britain	5	4	0	1	42	6	+36	8
Belgium	5	2	1	2	7	20	−13	5
Hungary	5	2	0	3	16	14	+2	4
Australia	5	1	1	3	15	18	−3	3
South Africa	5	0	0	5	6	61	−55	0

Slovenia was promoted to Division II for the 2007 Women's World Ice Hockey Championships

03 March 2005	Hungary	0–5	Great Britain

03 March 2005	Belgium	0–6	Slovenia

03 March 2005	South Africa	1–11	Australia

04 March 2005	Great Britain	11–0	Belgium

04 March 2005	Australia	0–3	Hungary

04 March 2005	Slovenia	19–2	South Africa

06 March 2005	Australia	1–1	Belgium

06 March 2005	Great Britain	1–4	Slovenia

06 March 2005	South Africa	1–9	Hungary

07 March 2005	Slovenia	7–1	Australia

07 March 2005	Hungary	0–3	Belgium

07 March 2005	Great Britain	19–0	South Africa

09 March 2005	Slovenia	5–4	Hungary

09 March 2005	Australia	2–6	Great Britain

09 March 2005	Belgium	3–2	South Africa

=== Statistics ===
==== Scoring leaders ====
Pos	Player	Country	GP	G	A	Pts	+/−	PIM
1	Jasmina Rosar	Slovenia	5	12	18	30	+25	0
2	Pia Pren	Slovenia	5	10	9	19	+21	2
3	Danila Tominc	Slovenia	5	9	4	13	+15	2
4	Teresa Lewis	Great Britain	5	6	6	12	+12	6
5	Nicola Bicknell	Great Britain	5	5	6	11	+7	0
6	Angela Taylor	Great Britain	5	4	6	10	+6	2
7	Zoe Bayne	Great Britain	5	3	5	8	+14	8
8	Emily Turner	Great Britain	5	2	6	8	+7	2
9	Sharna Godfrey	Australia	5	2	4	6	+2	2
10	Lisa McMahon	Australia	5	5	0	5	−4	4
10	Laura Burke	Great Britain	5	5	0	5	+13	4

GP = Games played; G = Goals; A = Assists; Pts = Points; +/− = P Plus–minus; PIM = Penalties In Minutes
Source: IIHF.com

==== Goaltending leaders ====
(minimum 40% team's total ice time)

Pos	Player	Country	TOI	GA	GAA	Sv%	SO
1	Kelly Herring	Great Britain	120:00	0	0.00	100.00	2
2	Hedvika Korbar	Slovenia	260:00	3	0.69	96.05	2
3	Vicky Robbins	Great Britain	178:20	5	1.68	92.65	1
4	Kristy Bruske	Australia	196:53	7	2.13	90.54	1
5	Eszter Kokenyesi	Hungary	279:50	13	2.79	90.37	1

TOI = Time on ice (minutes:seconds); GA = Goals against; GAA = Goals against average; Sv% = Save percentage; SO = Shutouts
Source: IIHF.com

== Division IV ==
The Division IV IIHF Women World Championships was held April 1–4, 2005 in Dunedin, New Zealand.

Team	Pld	W	D	L	GF	GA	GD	Pts
South Korea	3	3	0	0	15	5	+10	6
New Zealand	3	1	1	1	9	9	0	3
Romania	3	1	0	2	3	5	−2	2
Iceland	3	0	1	2	6	14	−8	1

South Korea was promoted to Division III at the 2007 Women's World Ice Hockey Championships

01 April 2005	New Zealand	3–0	Romania

01 April 2005	South Korea	8–2	Iceland

02 April 2005	Romania	2–0	Iceland

02 April 2005	South Korea	5–2	New Zealand

04 April 2005	Romania	1–2	South Korea

04 April 2005	Iceland	4–4	New Zealand

=== Statistics ===
==== Scoring leaders ====
Pos	Player	Country	GP	G	A	Pts	+/−	PIM
1	Hwangbo Young	South Korea	3	8	2	10	+7	2
2	Shin So-jung	South Korea	3	2	3	5	+7	2
3	Jung Hye-sun	South Korea	3	1	3	4	+7	0
4	Alyx Anderson	New Zealand	3	3	0	3	+2	0
4	Sigrun Arnadottir	Iceland	3	3	0	3	−2	2
6	Han Ae-ri	South Korea	3	1	2	3	+7	2
7	Rachel Gabbard	New Zealand	3	2	0	2	+1	2
7	Cho Eun-hyun	South Korea	3	2	0	2	+1	0
9	Shiree Haslemore	New Zealand	3	1	1	2	+4	7

GP = Games played; G = Goals; A = Assists; Pts = Points; +/− = P Plus–minus; PIM = Penalties In Minutes
Source: IIHF.com

==== Goaltending leaders ====
(minimum 40% team's total ice time)

Pos	Player	Country	TOI	GA	GAA	Sv%	SO
1	Ma Sang-hee	South Korea	180:00	5	1.67	94.25	0
2	Beata Antal	Romania	180:00	5	1.67	93.59	1
3	Jenny Haskell	New Zealand	180:00	8	2.67	86.21	1
4	Gyda Sigurdardottir	Iceland	180:00	13	4.33	85.23	0

TOI = Time on ice (minutes:seconds); GA = Goals against; GAA = Goals against average; Sv% = Save percentage; SO = Shutouts
Source: IIHF.com
