= Sabina Florian =

Italian ice hockey player

Personal information
- Nationality: Italian
- Born: 28 May 1983 (age 41); Bolzano, Italy

Sport
- Sport: Ice hockey

Sabina Florian (born 28 May 1983) is an Italian ice hockey player. She competed in the women's tournament at the 2006 Winter Olympics.
