= 2007 IIHF Women's World Championship =

Tournament details
- Host country: Canada
- Venues: 2 (in 2 host cities)
- Dates: April 3–10, 2007
- Opened by: Michaëlle Jean
- Teams: 9

Final positions
- Champions: Canada (9th title)
- Runners-up: United States
- Third place: Sweden
- Fourth place: Finland

Tournament statistics
- Games played: 20
- Goals scored: 118 (5.9 per game)
- Attendance: 119,231 (5,962 per game)
- Scoring leader: (Canada) Hayley Wickenheiser (14 points)

Awards
- MVP: Hayley Wickenheiser

The 2007 IIHF Women's World Championship was the 10th edition of the Top Division of the Women's Ice Hockey World Championship (the 11th edition overall, if the season when only the lower divisions were played is also counted), organized by the International Ice Hockey Federation (IIHF).

The Top Division tournament was held from April 3 to 10, 2007 in Winnipeg and Selkirk, Manitoba, Canada. There were no championships in 2006 due to the Torino Olympic tournament. Games were played at the MTS Centre and Selkirk Recreation Complex.

Canada, led by tournament MVP Hayley Wickenheiser, won its record-extending ninth world championship by defeating the USA 5–1 in the gold medal game. Following Sweden's historic Silver in the Olympics they captured their second world championship Bronze, blanking rival Finland 1–0. This championship was the first women's to have over one hundred thousand attendees, and it held the record for attendance until 2025.

In June 2006, the IIHF expanded Pool A from 8 to 9 teams, restoring Russia, which had been demoted to Division I after the 2005 event. The decision was made due to the success of the 9-team pool in the 2004 Championships. Because of this change, all teams demoted after the 2005 event were restored to their 2005 divisions for 2007. Three new countries entered the tournament for the first time in 2007.

== Venues ==
Winnipeg and Selkirk, Manitoba, Canada
Host Venue	Details
MTS Centre Canada Life Centre, 2010 (as MTS Centre)	Location: Winnipeg, Manitoba, Canada; Built: April 16, 2003; Opened: November 16, 2004; Formerly: MTS Centre and Bell MTS Place; Renamed: Canada Life Centre Capacity: Ice Hockey: 15,321
Selkirk Recreation Complex	Location: Selkirk, Manitoba, Canada; Opened: 1992; Capacity: Ice Hockey: 2,751

== Top Division ==
=== Preliminary round ===
All times are local (UTC−5).

==== Group A ====
Team	Pld	W	OTW	OTL	L	GF	GA	GD	Pts
United States	2	2	0	0	0	18	1	+17	6
China	2	1	0	0	1	8	9	−1	3
Kazakhstan	2	0	0	0	2	0	16	−16	0

April 3, 2007; 19:30	Kazakhstan	0–9 (0–5, 0–2, 0–2)	United States	Selkirk Recreation Complex, Selkirk; Attendance: 951

Game reference
Goals / A. Ruggiero 02:40 (PP); K. Wendell 03:05; E. Lawler 08:20 (PP); C. Cahow 11:39; S. Parsons 15:22; G. Marvin 27:31; S. Parsons 29:24; J. Zaugg 41:47; J. Potter 54:14
4 min	Penalties	4 min
14	Shots	44

April 4, 2007; 19:30	China	7–0 (2–0, 3–0, 2–0)	Kazakhstan	Selkirk Recreation Complex, Selkirk; Attendance: 849

Game reference
Ma R. 05:54; Sun R. 19:01 (PP); Tang L. 22:43; Zhang B. 23:42; Jin F. 38:16; Su Z. 40:56; Sang H. 41:19 / Goals
0 min	Penalties	12 min
41	Shots	27

April 5, 2007; 19:30	United States	9–1 (4–1, 3–0, 2–0)	China	Selkirk Recreation Complex, Selkirk; Attendance: 1,103

Game reference
K. King 00:27; K. Wendell 1:26; C. Cahow 4:02 (PP); E. Lawler 16:51; S. Parsons 30:18 (PP); M. Engstrom 31:31 (PP); N. Darwitz 36:54; N. Darwitz 54:49 (SH); J. Zaugg 56:11 / Goals / Sun R. 12:10 (SH)
10 min	Penalties	10 min
65	Shots	14

==== Group B ====
Team	Pld	W	OTW	OTL	L	GF	GA	GD	Pts
Canada	2	2	0	0	0	17	0	+17	6
Switzerland	2	1	0	0	1	1	9	−8	3
Germany	2	0	0	0	2	0	9	−9	0

April 3, 2007; 19:30	Switzerland	0–9 (0–5, 0–2, 0–2)	Canada	MTS Centre, Winnipeg; Attendance: 10,706

Game reference
Goals / D. Goyette 01:01; D. Goyette 07:14; H. Wickenheiser 11:10 (PP); K. Weatherston 16:41 (PP); C. Ouellette 39:24 (PP); K. Bechard 39:52; D. Goyette 50:55; K. Weatherston 52:32
24 min	Penalties	8 min
17	Shots	63

April 4, 2007; 19:30	Germany	0–1 (0–0, 0–1, 0–0)	Switzerland	MTS Centre, Winnipeg; Attendance: 4,102

Game reference
Goals / K. Lehmann 35:51 (PP)
14 min	Penalties	12 min
16	Shots	20

April 5, 2007; 19:30	Canada	8–0 (2–0, 2–0, 4–0)	Germany	MTS Centre, Winnipeg; Attendance: 10,715

Game reference
J. Botterill 02:27; H. Wickenheiser 03:03; G. Kingsbury 22:40; H. Wickenheiser 36:20; H. Wickenheiser 40:54; J. Botterill 54:04; K. Weatherston 54:52; D. Goyette 55:51 / Goals
10 min	Penalties	14 min
70	Shots	5

==== Group C ====
Team	Pld	W	OTW	OTL	L	GF	GA	GD	Pts
Finland	2	1	1	0	0	5	0	+5	5
Sweden	2	1	0	1	0	3	3	0	4
Russia	2	0	0	0	2	2	7	−5	0

April 3, 2007; 16:00	Russia	2–3 (0–2, 0–0, 2–1)	Sweden	MTS Centre, Winnipeg; Attendance: 3,243

Game reference
T. Burina 55:27; I. Gavrilova 58:37 (PP) / Goals / N. Jansson 05:07 (SH); P. Winberg 16:06; E. Holst 42:10
12 min	Penalties	22 min
20	Shots	34

April 4, 2007; 16:00	Finland	4–0 (1–0, 1–0, 2–0)	Russia	MTS Centre, Winnipeg; Attendance: 3,350

Game reference
M. Pehkonen 06:42; K. Kovalainen 24:48 (PP); K. Riipi 43:05; N. Tallus 48:28 (PP) / Goals
16 min	Penalties	16 min
24	Shots	19

April 5, 2007; 16:00	Sweden	0–1 OT (0–0, 0–0, 0–0) (OT: 0–1)	Finland	MTS Centre, Winnipeg; Attendance: 4,069

Game reference
Goals / S. Sirviö 61:32
16 min	Penalties	6 min
21	Shots	26

=== Qualifying round ===
==== Group D (1–3 Place) ====
Team	Pld	W	OTW	OTL	L	GF	GA	GD	Pts
Canada	2	1	1	0	0	10	4	+6	5
United States	2	1	0	1	0	8	5	+3	4
Finland	2	0	0	0	2	0	9	−9	0

April 7, 2007; 15:30	United States	4–5 GWS (2–1, 2–3, 0–0) (OT: 0–0) (SO: 0–1)	Canada	MTS Centre, Winnipeg; Attendance: 15,003

Game reference
J. Potter 07:49; K. Wendell 17:47; G. Marvin 26:52; N. Darwitz 31:06 (PP) / Goals / K. Bechard 01:21; S. Vaillancourt 23:21 (PP); H. Wickenheiser 32:23; G. Apps 34:57; H. Wickenheiser 70:00 (GWS)
16 min	Penalties	20 min
26	Shots	31

April 8, 2007; 19:30	Finland	0–4 (0–2, 0–1, 0–1)	United States	MTS Centre, Winnipeg; Attendance: 4,758

Game reference
Goals / N. Darwitz 09:53; K. Wendell 18:18; M. Engstrom 30:50; K. King 43:31
18 min	Penalties	20 min
13	Shots	37

April 9, 2007; 19:30	Canada	5–0 (3–0, 1–0, 1–0)	Finland	MTS Centre, Winnipeg; Attendance: 10,691

Game reference
K. Bechard 10:25; T. Bonhomme 12:44; D. Goyette 17:15; H. Wickenheiser 29:45; G. Kingsbury 41:36 / Goals
6 min	Penalties	8 min
44	Shots	22

==== Group E (4–6 Place) ====
Team	Pld	W	OTW	OTL	L	GF	GA	GD	Pts
Sweden	2	2	0	0	0	16	2	+14	6
Switzerland	2	1	0	0	1	5	5	0	3
China	2	0	0	0	2	3	17	−14	0

April 7, 2007; 19:30	China	1–5 (0–1, 1–2, 0–2)	Switzerland	MTS Centre, Winnipeg; Attendance: 4,048

Game reference
Zhang B. 25:26 (PP) / Goals / L. Ruhnke 19:08; D. Diaz 32:27 (PP); C. Meier 38:16; S. Marty 53:09; L. Rhunke 53:44
8 min	Penalties	10 min
19	Shots	31

April 8, 2007; 15:30	Sweden	12–2 (2–1, 5–0, 5–1)	China	MTS Centre, Winnipeg; Attendance: 3,500

Game reference
G. Andersson 02:54; K. Timglas 03:36; N. Jansson 21:10; T. Enström 21:39; M. Rooth 22:30 (PP); P. Winberg 24:43 (PP); D. Rundqvist 35:22; J. Elfsberg 40:11; J. Elfsberg 46:01 (PP); G. Andersson 48:08; M. Rooth 57:04 (PP); P. Winberg 57:13 / Goals / Sang H. 15:03 (PP); Sun R. 50:58
14 min	Penalties	16 min
53	Shots	16

April 9, 2007; 16:00	Switzerland	0–4 (0–1, 0–1, 0–2)	Sweden	MTS Centre, Winnipeg; Attendance: 3,761

Game reference
Goals / P. Winberg 15:45; M. Rooth 32:04; P. Winberg 45:22; K. Timglas 54:20
32 min	Penalties	12 min
16	Shots	57

=== Consolation round ===
==== Group F (7–9 Place) ====
Team	Pld	W	OTW	OTL	L	GF	GA	GD	Pts
Russia	2	2	0	0	0	11	1	+10	6
Germany	2	1	0	0	1	4	4	0	3
Kazakhstan	2	0	0	0	2	0	10	−10	0

April 7, 2007; 12:00	Kazakhstan	0–3 (0–2, 0–0, 0–1)	Germany	MTS Centre, Winnipeg; Attendance: 2,124

Game reference
Goals / F. Busch 04:57 (PP); A. Lanzl 11:59 (PP); B. Evers 45:32 (PP)
20 min	Penalties	18 min
24	Shots	33

April 8, 2007; 12:00	Russia	7–0 (0–0, 6–0, 1–0)	Kazakhstan	MTS Centre, Winnipeg; Attendance: 1,959

Game reference
E. Smolentseva 22:07; E. Smolentseva 24:06; Svetlana Terentieva 25:46; I. Gavrilova 30:40; O. Semenets 31:35; I. Gavrilova 36:25; E. Smolentseva 48:40 / Goals
14 min	Penalties	14 min
50	Shots	14

April 9, 2007; 12:00	Germany	1–4 (1–2, 0–0, 0–2)	Russia	MTS Centre, Winnipeg; Attendance: 10,741

Game reference
Carina Spuhler 08:47 / Goals / E. Smolentseva 03:51; S. Trefilova 07:13; T. Burina 49:24; I. Gavrilova 59:12 (EN)
6 min	Penalties	2 min
24	Shots	25

Kazakhstan will be demoted to Division I for the 2008 Women's World Ice Hockey Championships.

=== Final round ===
==== Bronze medal game ====
April 10, 2007; 15:30	Finland	0–1 (0–0, 0–0, 0–1)	Sweden	MTS Centre, Winnipeg; Attendance: 8,555

Game reference
Noora Räty	Goalies	Kim Martin	Referee: (United States) Leah Wrazidlo; Linesmen: (France) Anne-Sophie Boniface (Canada) Kerri Rumble
0–1 / 42:37 – Rooth (Holst)			Referee: (United States) Leah Wrazidlo; Linesmen: (France) Anne-Sophie Boniface (Canada) Kerri Rumble
12 min	Penalties	16 min	Referee: (United States) Leah Wrazidlo; Linesmen: (France) Anne-Sophie Boniface (Canada) Kerri Rumble
28	Shots	25	Referee: (United States) Leah Wrazidlo; Linesmen: (France) Anne-Sophie Boniface (Canada) Kerri Rumble

==== Final ====
April 10, 2007; 19:30	Canada	5–1 (0–0, 3–0, 2–1)	United States	MTS Centre, Winnipeg; Attendance: 15,003

Game reference

Kim St-Pierre
Goalies
Chanda Gunn
Referee:
(United Kingdom) Joy Tottman
Linesmen:
(Finland) Sanna Mattila
(Canada) Heather Richardson

Botterill (Ouellette, MacLeod) – 20:58	1–0
Hefford (Sunohara) – 31:33	2–0
Wickenheiser (Collins, Sostorics) – 36:27	3–0
Goyette (Vaillancourt, Ouellette) – 49:22	4–0
	4–1	50:08 – Wendell (Lawler, Darwitz)
Vaillancourt – 57:06	5–1

12 min
Penalties
14 min
34
Shots
22

=== Awards and statistics ===
==== Scoring leaders ====
Pos	Player	Country	GP	G	A	Pts	+/−	PIM
1	Hayley Wickenheiser	Canada	5	8	6	14	+11	0
2	Krissy Wendell	United States	5	5	7	12	+5	8
3	Danielle Goyette	Canada	5	6	5	11	+10	0
4	Natalie Darwitz	United States	5	4	5	9	+6	6
5	Pernilla Winberg	Sweden	5	5	3	8	+8	8
6	Maria Rooth	Sweden	5	4	2	6	+5	4
7	Sarah Parsons	United States	5	3	3	6	+5	2
8	Erika Lawler	United States	5	2	4	6	+5	2
8	Sarah Vaillancourt	Canada	5	2	4	6	+6	4
10	Iya Gavrilova	Russia	4	4	1	5	+7	2

GP = Games played; G = Goals; A = Assists; Pts = Points; +/− = P Plus–minus; PIM = Penalties In Minutes Source: IIHF.com

==== Goaltending leaders ====
(minimum 40% team's total ice time)

Pos	Player	Country	TOI	GA	GAA	Sv%	SO
1	Kim St-Pierre	Canada	180:00	1	0.33	97.96	2
2	Kim Martin	Sweden	175:02	3	1.03	95.77	0
3	Jennifer Harß	Germany	123:55	2	0.97	95.65	1
4	Sara Grahn	Sweden	126:30	2	0.95	94.29	1
5	Noora Räty	Finland	301:32	10	1.99	93.15	2

TOI = Time On Ice (minutes:seconds); GA = Goals against; GAA = Goals against average; Sv% = Save percentage; SO = Shutouts Source: IIHF.com

==== Directorate Awards ====
- Goaltender: (Finland) Noora Räty
- Defenceman: (United States) Molly Engstrom
- Forward: (Canada) Hayley Wickenheiser

Source: IIHF.com

==== Media All-Stars ====
- Goaltender: (Canada) Kim St-Pierre
- Defencemen: (United States) Angela Ruggiero, (Canada) Delaney Collins
- Forwards: (United States) Krissy Wendell, (Canada) Hayley Wickenheiser, (United States) Natalie Darwitz
- Most Valuable Player: (Canada) Hayley Wickenheiser

Source: IIHF.com

== Division I ==
The following teams took part in the Division I tournament, held from April 2, 2007, through April 8, 2007 in Nikkō, Japan:

Team	Pld	W	OTW	OTL	L	GF	GA	GD	Pts
Japan	5	5	0	0	0	25	5	+20	15
Latvia	5	3	0	1	1	13	9	+4	10
France	5	1	1	2	1	10	17	−7	7
Norway	5	2	0	0	3	8	9	−1	6
Czech Republic	5	1	1	0	3	12	16	−4	5
Denmark	5	0	1	0	4	5	17	−12	2

Japan is promoted to the main tournament and Denmark is demoted to Division II in the 2008 Women's World Ice Hockey Championships

02 April 2007	Norway	1–2	France

02 April 2007	Denmark	1–3	Czech Republic

02 April 2007	Latvia	2–5	Japan

03 April 2007	Czech Republic	1–3	Norway

03 April 2007	France	3–2 (OT)	Latvia

03 April 2007	Japan	4–1	Denmark

05 April 2007	Latvia	5–0	Denmark

05 April 2007	Czech Republic	5–4 (OT)	France

05 April 2007	Japan	3–0	Norway

07 April 2007	Czech Republic	1–2	Latvia

07 April 2007	Denmark	1–4	Norway

07 April 2007	France	0–7	Japan

08 April 2007	Norway	0–2	Latvia

08 April 2007	France	1–2 (OT)	Denmark

08 April 2007	Japan	6–2	Czech Republic

=== Statistics ===
==== Scoring leaders ====
Pos	Player	Country	GP	G	A	Pts	+/−	PIM
1	Yurie Adachi	Japan	5	6	4	10	+7	4
2	Laila Stolte	Latvia	5	6	2	8	+2	8
2	Iveta Koka	Latvia	5	4	4	8	+5	2
4	Chiaki Yamanaka	Japan	5	1	7	8	+6	6
5	Ami Nakamura	Japan	5	4	3	7	+3	2
6	Shoko Nihonyanagi	Japan	5	2	4	6	+7	6
7	Eva Holešová	Czech Republic	5	4	1	5	−1	6
7	Simona Studentová	Czech Republic	5	4	1	5	+5	0
9	Inese Geca-Miljone	Latvia	5	3	2	5	+4	2
10	Yuki Togawa	Japan	5	3	1	4	+1	4

GP = Games played; G = Goals; A = Assists; Pts = Points; +/− = P Plus–minus; PIM = Penalties In Minutes

Source: IIHF.com

==== Goaltending leaders ====
(minimum 40% team's total ice time)

Pos	Player	Country	TOI	GA	GAA	Sv%	SO
1	Christine Smestad	Norway	219:40	6	1.64	94.92	0
2	Azusa Nakaoku	Japan	180:00	2	0.67	94.59	2
3	Lolita Andrisevska	Latvia	241:04	9	2.24	94.03	1
4	Petra Šmardová	Czech Republic	163:59	7	2.56	88.89	0
5	Orane Leenders	France	246:04	15	3.66	85.44	0

TOI = Time On Ice (minutes:seconds); GA = Goals against; GAA = Goals against average; Sv% = Save percentage; SO = Shutouts

Source: IIHF.com

== Division II ==
The following teams took part in the Division II tournament, held from March 17, 2007, through March 23, 2007 in Pyongyang, North Korea.

Team	Pld	W	OTW	OTL	L	GF	GA	GD	Pts
Slovakia	5	5	0	0	0	25	3	+22	15
Italy	5	2	2	0	1	14	15	−1	10
North Korea	5	3	0	1	1	22	7	+15	10
Austria	5	2	0	0	3	17	11	+6	6
Netherlands	5	0	1	1	3	6	23	−17	3
Slovenia	5	0	0	1	4	5	30	−25	1

Slovakia is promoted to Division I and Slovenia is demoted to Division III in the 2008 Women's World Ice Hockey Championships

17 March 2007	North Korea	2–3 (OT)	Italy

17 March 2007	Netherlands	0–6	Austria

17 March 2007	Slovakia	8–0	Slovenia

18 March 2007	Italy	2–1	Austria

18 March 2007	Slovenia	2–3 (OT)	Netherlands

18 March 2007	Slovakia	4–1	North Korea

20 March 2007	Slovakia	4–0	Netherlands

20 March 2007	Italy	5–3	Slovenia

20 March 2007	North Korea	6–0	Austria

21 March 2007	Netherlands	3–4 (OT)	Italy

21 March 2007	Austria	2–3	Slovakia

21 March 2007	Slovenia	0–6	North Korea

23 March 2007	Austria	8–0	Slovenia

23 March 2007	Italy	0–6	Slovakia

23 March 2007	North Korea	7–0	Netherlands

=== Statistics ===
==== Scoring leaders ====
Pos	Player	Country	GP	G	A	Pts	+/−	PIM
1	Denise Altmann	Austria	5	6	7	13	+8	0
2	Esther Kantor	Austria	5	3	6	9	+8	0
3	Petra Daňková	Slovakia	5	1	7	8	+10	4
4	Janka Čulíková	Slovakia	5	6	1	7	+10	6
5	Petra Jurčová	Slovakia	5	5	2	7	+8	2
6	Han Mi-song	North Korea	5	4	3	7	+7	2
7	Ri Sol-gyong	North Korea	5	3	4	7	+6	0
8	Sabina Florian	Italy	5	3	3	6	0	8
8	Jana Kapustová	Slovakia	5	3	3	6	+8	4
8	Martina Veličková	Slovakia	5	3	3	6	+6	4

GP = Games played; G = Goals; A = Assists; Pts = Points; +/− = P Plus–minus; PIM = Penalties In Minutes

Source: IIHF.com

==== Goaltending leaders ====
(minimum 40% team's total ice time)

Pos	Player	Country	TOI	GA	GAA	Sv%	SO
1	Zuzana Tomčíková	Slovakia	300:00	3	0.60	96.77	3
2	Sandra Borschke	Austria	195:01	7	2.15	93.33	1
3	Hong Kum-sil	North Korea	272:49	7	1.54	92.39	1
4	Helena Kysela	Netherlands	221:56	17	4.60	85.47	0
5	Chiara Traversa	Italy	185:00	9	2.92	85.25	0

TOI = Time On Ice (minutes:seconds); GA = Goals against; GAA = Goals against average; Sv% = Save percentage; SO = Shutouts

Source: IIHF.com

== Division III ==
The following teams took part in the Division III tournament, held from March 5, 2007, through March 10, 2007 in Sheffield, England:

Team	Pld	W	OTW	OTL	L	GF	GA	GD	Pts
Australia	5	4	1	0	0	41	9	+32	14
Great Britain	5	4	0	1	0	57	8	+49	13
Belgium	5	3	0	0	2	22	18	+4	9
Hungary	5	2	0	0	3	22	19	+3	6
South Korea	5	1	0	0	4	12	27	−15	3
South Africa	5	0	0	0	5	4	77	−73	0

Australia is promoted to Division II and South Africa is demoted to Division IV in the 2008 Women's World Ice Hockey Championships

05 March 2007	Belgium	4–2	South Korea

05 March 2007	South Africa	1–18	Australia

05 March 2007	Hungary	1–8	Great Britain

06 March 2007	South Korea	8–1	South Africa

06 March 2007	Belgium	5–0	Hungary

06 March 2007	Great Britain	5–6 (OT)	Australia

07 March 2007	Belgium	10–1	South Africa

07 March 2007	Hungary	1–3	Australia

07 March 2007	Great Britain	10–0	South Korea

09 March 2007	Australia	8–2	Belgium

09 March 2007	South Korea	2–6	Hungary

09 March 2007	South Africa	0–27	Great Britain

10 March 2007	Australia	6–0	South Korea

10 March 2007	Hungary	14–1	South Africa

10 March 2007	Great Britain	7–1	Belgium

=== Statistics ===
==== Scoring leaders ====
Pos	Player	Country	GP	G	A	Pts	+/−	PIM
1	Debbie Palmer	Great Britain	5	7	10	17	+18	2
2	Laura Bryne	Great Britain	5	8	8	16	+16	8
3	Natasha Farrier	Australia	5	5	7	12	0	0
4	Nicola Bicknell	Great Britain	5	5	6	11	+17	0
4	Eleanor Maitland	Great Britain	5	5	6	11	+16	4
6	Hwangbo Young	South Korea	5	7	3	10	+5	6
7	Rylie Padjen	Australia	5	6	4	10	+9	2
7	Sara Verpoest	Belgium	5	6	4	10	0	0
9	Ramona Gagyor	Hungary	5	7	2	9	+4	8
10	Stephanie Boxall	Australia	5	5	4	5	+8	0

GP = Games played; G = Goals; A = Assists; Pts = Points; +/− = P Plus–minus; PIM = Penalties In Minutes

Source: IIHF.com

==== Goaltending leaders ====
(minimum 40% team's total ice time)

Pos	Player	Country	TOI	GA	GAA	Sv%	SO
1	Shin So-jung	South Korea	185:43	13	4.20	92.97	0
2	Kristy Bruske	Australia	238:51	6	1.51	91.78	0
3	Monika Palotas	Hungary	260:00	18	4.15	90.37	0
4	Kelly Herring	Great Britain	185:00	7	1.68	90.28	1
5	Kristen Schonwetter	Belgium	211:38	16	4.54	90.06	1

TOI = Time On Ice (minutes:seconds); GA = Goals against; GAA = Goals against average; Sv% = Save percentage; SO = Shutouts

Source: IIHF.com

== Division IV ==
The following teams took part in the Division IV tournament, held from March 26, 2007, through April 1, 2007 in Miercurea-Ciuc, Romania:

Team	Pld	W	OTW	OTL	L	GF	GA	GD	Pts
Croatia	5	5	0	0	0	41	6	+35	15
Romania	5	4	0	0	1	44	12	+32	12
New Zealand	5	3	0	0	2	45	9	+36	9
Estonia	5	1	1	0	3	21	20	+1	5
Iceland	5	1	0	1	3	17	23	−6	4
Turkey	5	0	0	0	5	3	91	−88	0

Croatia is promoted to Division III in the 2008 Women's World Ice Hockey Championships

26 March 2007	Iceland	0–10	New Zealand

26 March 2007	Estonia	0–12	Croatia

26 March 2007	Romania	27–0	Turkey

27 March 2007	New Zealand	3–4	Croatia

27 March 2007	Turkey	1–14	Estonia

27 March 2007	Romania	5–2	Iceland

29 March 2007	New Zealand	19–0	Turkey

29 March 2007	Iceland	0–3	Croatia

29 March 2007	Romania	5–3	Estonia

30 March 2007	Turkey	1–12	Iceland

30 March 2007	Croatia	3–2	Romania

30 March 2007	Estonia	0–9	New Zealand

01 April 2007	Croatia	19–1	Turkey

01 April 2007	Iceland	3–4 (OT)	Estonia

01 April 2007	New Zealand	4–5	Romania

=== Awards and statistics ===
==== Scoring leaders ====
Pos	Player	Country	GP	G	A	Pts	+/−	PIM
1	Diana Kruseljposavec	Croatia	5	25	2	27	+19	4
2	Magdolna Dobondi	Romania	5	7	10	17	+14	6
3	Ibolya Sandor	Romania	5	6	9	15	+15	6
4	Sanja Vickovic	Croatia	5	4	9	13	+13	6
5	Alyx Anderson	New Zealand	5	4	8	12	+11	0
6	Shiree Haslemore	New Zealand	5	8	3	11	+15	2
7	Irina Pana	Romania	5	7	4	11	+13	2
8	Hollie Anderson	New Zealand	5	6	5	11	+8	12
8	Casey Redman	New Zealand	5	6	5	11	+6	6
10	Megan Gilchrist	New Zealand	5	5	6	11	+15	6

GP = Games played; G = Goals; A = Assists; Pts = Points; +/− = P Plus–minus; PIM = Penalties In Minutes

Source: IIHF.com

==== Goaltending leaders ====
(minimum 40% team's total ice time)

Pos	Player	Country	TOI	GA	GAA	Sv%	SO
1	Lyndal Heineman	New Zealand	140:00	0	0.00	100.00	2
2	Petra Belobrk	Croatia	200:51	4	1.19	94.59	1
3	Beata Antal	Romania	172:44	7	2.43	91.25	0
4	Karitas Halldorsdottir	Iceland	160:00	14	5.25	87.61	0
5	Kaidi Ilves	Estonia	158:53	13	4.91	82.19	0

TOI = Time On Ice (minutes:seconds); GA = Goals against; GAA = Goals against average; Sv% = Save percentage; SO = Shutouts

Source: IIHF.com

==== Directorate Awards ====
- Goaltender: Beata Antal, Romania
- Defenseman: Diana Kruseljposavec, Croatia
- Forward: Shiree Haslemore, New Zealand

Source: IIHF.com

== See also ==
- 2007 in ice hockey
