= Slovakia women's national ice hockey team =

Women's national ice hockey team representing Slovakia

Slovakia
- The Coat of arms of Slovakia is the badge used on the players' jerseys.
- Nickname: Repre (Representation)
- Association: Slovak Ice Hockey Federation
- General manager: Tomáš Pšenka
- Head coach: Miroslav Mosnár
- Assistants: Iveta Frühauf
- Captain: Romana Košecká
- Most games: Jana Kapustová (104)
- Top scorer: Jana Kapustová (48)
- Most points: Jana Kapustová (101)
- Team colors
- IIHF code: SVK
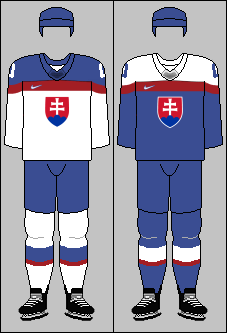

Ranking
- Current IIHF: 17 ▼2 (3 June 2026)
- Highest IIHF: 7 (2012)
- Lowest IIHF: 19 (2006)

First international
- Slovakia 4–1 Great Britain (Odense, Denmark; 27 March 1995)

Biggest win
- Slovakia 82–0 Bulgaria (Liepāja, Latvia; 8 September 2008)

Biggest defeat
- Canada 18–0 Slovakia (Vancouver, Canada; 13 February 2010)

Olympics
- Appearances: 1 (first in 2010)

World Championships
- Appearances: 22 (first in 1999)
- Best result: 7th (2011)

European Championships
- Appearances: 2 (first in 1995)
- Best result: 10th (1995, 1996)

International record (W–L–T)
- 179–205–11

The Slovak women's national ice hockey team represents Slovakia at the International Ice Hockey Federation's IIHF World Women's Championships. The women's national team is managed by the Slovak Ice Hockey Federation (SZĽH). Slovakia had 847 female players in 2023 and is ranked 15th in the IIHF rankings.

== Tournament record ==
=== Olympic Games ===
During qualification for the 2010 Winter Olympics in Vancouver, Slovakia defeated Bulgaria 82–0. This win is the most lopsided in the history of the IIHF. The Slovaks outshot Bulgaria 142–0, averaging a goal on 58.9 percent of its shots. Slovakia averaged one goal every 44 seconds. Janka Čulíková led Slovakia with 10 goals, while Martina Veličková scored nine. The game broke the Guinness World Record for the highest score in a single ice hockey game.

In the women's ice hockey tournament at the 2010 Winter Olympics, however, Slovakia lost to Canada 18–0, marking the most lopsided victory in Olympic competition.

- 2010 – Finished in 8th place

=== World Championship ===
- 1999 – Finished in 15th place (7th in Pool B)
- 2000 – Finished in 18th place (2nd in Pool B Qualification)
- 2001 – Finished in 17th place (1st in Division I Qualification Group A)
- 2003 – Finished in 17th place (3rd in Division II)
- 2004 – Finished in 18th place (3rd in Division II)
- 2005 – Finished in 17th place (3rd in Division II)
- 2007 – Finished in 16th place (1st in Division II)
- 2008 – Finished in 11th place (2nd in Division I)
- 2009 – Finished in 10th place (1st in Division I, promoted to Top Division)
- 2011 – Finished in 7th place
- 2012 – Finished in 8th place (Relegated to Division IA)
- 2013 – Finished in 11th place (3rd in Division IA)
- 2014 – Finished in 14th place (6th in Division IA, relegated to Division IB)
- 2015 – Finished in 15th place (1st in Division IB, promoted to Division IA)
- 2016 – Finished in 14th place (6th in Division IA, relegated to Division IB)
- 2017 – Finished in 15th place (1st in Division IB, promoted to Division IA)
- 2018 – Finished in 15th place (6th in Division IA)
- 2019 – Finished in 15th place (5th in Division IA)
- 2020 – Cancelled due to the COVID-19 pandemic
- 2021 – Cancelled due to the COVID-19 pandemic
- 2022 – Finished in 13th place (3rd in Division IA)
- 2023 – Finished in 16th place (6th in Division IA, relegated to Division IB)
- 2024 – Finished in 17th place (1st in Division IB, promoted to Division IA)
- 2025 – Finished in 13th place (3rd in Division IA)
- 2026 – Finished in 14th place (4th in Division IA)
- 2027 – (Division IA)

=== IIHF European Cup of Nations ===
- 2026–27 – (Group B)

=== European Championship ===
- 1995 – Finished in 10th place
- 1996 – Finished in 10th place

== Team ==
=== Current roster ===
Roster for the Group A tournament of the 2025 IIHF Women's World Championship Division I.

Head coach: Miroslav Mosnár
Assistant coaches: Iveta Frühauf, Roman Mega

No.	Pos.	Name	Height	Weight	Birthdate	Team
1	G	Simona Hupková	1.75 m (5 ft 9 in)	75 kg (165 lb)	15 February 2006 (age 20)	(Slovakia) HK PSRŽ Bratislava
2	F	Hana Fančovičová	1.63 m (5 ft 4 in)	53 kg (117 lb)	2 May 2004 (age 22)	(Slovakia) HK PSRŽ Bratislava
3	D	Nikola Janeková	1.72 m (5 ft 8 in)	61 kg (134 lb)	22 November 2004 (age 21)	(Slovakia) HK PSRŽ Bratislava
4	D	Ema Gálisová	1.68 m (5 ft 6 in)	69 kg (152 lb)	20 November 2005 (age 20)	(Slovakia) HK PSRŽ Bratislava
6	F	Lucia Ištocyová	1.67 m (5 ft 6 in)	66 kg (146 lb)	2 July 1999 (age 27)	(Slovakia) HK PSRŽ Bratislava
7	F	Nikola Nemčeková	1.71 m (5 ft 7 in)	62 kg (137 lb)	4 July 2002 (age 24)	(Slovakia) HK PSRŽ Bratislava
8	F	Nela Lopušanová	1.70 m (5 ft 7 in)	72 kg (159 lb)	26 February 2008 (age 18)	(United States) Bishop Kearney Selects
9	F	Michaela Paulínyová	1.69 m (5 ft 7 in)	58 kg (128 lb)	23 June 2006 (age 20)	(Canada) Ontario Hockey Academy
10	F	Janka Hlinková	1.71 m (5 ft 7 in)	70 kg (150 lb)	31 October 1995 (age 31)	(Slovakia) HK PSRŽ Bratislava
11	D	Emília Leskovjanská	1.66 m (5 ft 5 in)	67 kg (148 lb)	7 September 2003 (age 23)	(Slovakia) ŽHK Poprad
12	F	Lucia Halušková	1.65 m (5 ft 5 in)	65 kg (143 lb)	18 December 2000 (age 25)	(Slovakia) HK PSRŽ Bratislava
14	F	Barbora Kapičáková	1.67 m (5 ft 6 in)	66 kg (146 lb)	27 April 2004 (age 22)	(China) Beijing Swift
15	D	Romana Košecká	1.69 m (5 ft 7 in)	69 kg (152 lb)	24 May 1999 (age 27)	(Slovakia) HK PSRŽ Bratislava
17	F	Júlia Matejková	1.68 m (5 ft 6 in)	70 kg (150 lb)	17 March 2002 (age 24)	(Finland) HPK Hämeenlinna
18	F	Ema Tóthová	1.78 m (5 ft 10 in)	68 kg (150 lb)	6 August 2007 (age 19)	(Slovakia) HC Slovan Bratislava
19	F	Lilien Benáková	1.70 m (5 ft 7 in)	58 kg (128 lb)	15 June 2006 (age 20)	(Canada) Ontario Hockey Academy
20	G	Lívia Debnárová	1.61 m (5 ft 3 in)	64 kg (141 lb)	2 February 2006 (age 20)	(United States) Winchendon School
21	F	Laura Jancsóová	1.75 m (5 ft 9 in)	73 kg (161 lb)	30 August 2005 (age 21)	(Slovakia) HK PSRŽ Bratislava
22	D	Laura Šuliková	1.61 m (5 ft 3 in)	55 kg (121 lb)	29 October 2001 (age 25)	(Slovakia) ŽHK Poprad
23	D	Lucia Drábeková	1.77 m (5 ft 10 in)	70 kg (150 lb)	8 February 1999 (age 27)	(China) Beijing Swift
24	D	Simone Martina Bednárik	1.70 m (5 ft 7 in)	61 kg (134 lb)	29 July 2003 (age 23)	(United States) SUNY Oswego Lakers
25	G	Adriána Štofanková	1.65 m (5 ft 5 in)	78 kg (172 lb)	1 January 1999 (age 27)	(Slovakia) ŽHK 2000 Šarišanka Prešov
