= Ice hockey at the 2009 Winter Universiade =

Ice hockey at the XXIV Winter Universiade
- Venues: Harbin Ice Hockey Gym; The Skating Gym of HIPE
- Dates: 18–28 February 2009
- Teams: 10 (men); 6 (women)

Ice hockey at the 2009 Winter Universiade comprised two ice hockey tournaments – a men's tournament and a women's tournament – during the Harbin 2009 edition of the Universiade. Both tournaments were hosted in Harbin, China and began on 18 February 2009. The event featured the inaugural women's ice hockey tournament at the Winter Universiade – the men's ice hockey tournament was first introduced in 1962.

== Venues ==
Harbin
Men	Women and Men
Skating Gym of HIPE; Capacity: 6,000	Harbin Ice Hockey Gym; Capacity: ≥5,700

== Men ==
2009 Winter Universiade men's tournament
Tournament details
- Host country: China
- City: Harbin
- Venues: 2 (in 1 host city)
- Dates: 18–28 February 2009
- Teams: 10

Final positions
- Champions: Russia (4th title)
- Runners-up: Canada
- Third place: Slovakia
- Fourth place: Kazakhstan

Tournament statistics
- Games played: 27
- Goals scored: 243 (9 per game)
- Attendance: 52,818 (1,956 per game)
- Scoring leader: (Russia) Evgeny Belukhin (14 points)

The men's ice hockey tournament at the 2009 Winter Universiade was held at the Skating Gym of Harbin Institute of Physical Education (HIPE; also known as Harbin Sports University) and Harbin Ice Hockey Gym during 18 to 28 February 2009. Ten national teams comprising university students participated in the event, representing Canada, China, Czechia, Great Britain, Japan, Kazakhstan, Russia, Slovakia, South Korea, and the United States.

In the preliminary round, teams were split into two closed groups of five teams. Each group played a single round-robin to determine ranking for the placement games. All preliminary round games were held at the Skating Gym of HIPE.

=== Preliminary round ===
==== Group A ====
Standings

Pos	Team	Pld	W	OTW	OTL	L	GF	GA	GD	Pts	Qualification
1	Canada	4	4	0	0	0	34	5	+29	12	Semifinals
2	Kazakhstan	4	3	0	0	1	25	9	+16	9	Semifinals
3	Czechia	4	2	0	0	2	27	8	+19	6	Fifth place game
4	China (H)	4	1	0	0	3	7	40	−33	3	Seventh place game
5	Great Britain	4	0	0	0	4	5	36	−31	0	Ninth place game

Source: FISU
(H) Host

==== Group B ====
Standings

Pos	Team	Pld	W	OTW	OTL	L	GF	GA	GD	Pts	Qualification
1	Russia	4	4	0	0	0	43	4	+39	12	Semifinals
2	Slovakia	4	2	0	1	1	15	17	−2	7	Semifinals
3	Japan	4	2	0	0	2	12	21	−9	6	Fifth place game
4	United States	4	0	2	0	2	13	22	−9	4	Seventh place game
5	South Korea	4	0	0	1	3	9	28	−19	1	Ninth place game

Source: FISU

=== Ninth place game ===
26 February 2009; 12:00	Great Britain	0–3 (0–1, 0–2, 0–0)	South Korea	The Skating Gym of HIPE; Attendance: 1,000

Geoff Woolhouse
Goalies
Yoo Sung-je
Referee:
(China) Zhanyong Wang
Linesmen:
(China) Fu Yu
(United States) Derek Wahl

0–1	01:42 – Han (Suh)
0–2	37:55 – Lee D. (Kim B., Kim D.) (PP2)
0–3	39:25 – Sin (Kim M., Park) (PP)

30 min
Penalties
18 min
17
Shots
40

=== Seventh place game ===
26 February 2009; 15:30	China	2–10 (0–3, 0–5, 2–2)	United States	The Skating Gym of HIPE; Attendance: 1,500

Cao Longhai
Xie Ming
Goalies
Stephen Yu
Referee:
(Finland) Anssi Salonen
Linesmen:
(Canada) Sean Dufour
(Finland) Sakari Suominen

	0–1	04:45 – O'Bannon (Liang) (PP)
	0–2	18:17 – Krannich (DeLorenzo, Pringle) (PP)
	0–3	19:33 – Heredia (Sweezey, Butler)
	0–4	29:24 – Krannich (McWhorter)
	0–5	30:36 – Zimmel (Pringle, DeLorenzo)
	0–6	30:46 – Gehring (Hoelzer)
	0–7	33:14 – Heredia (Sheehan, Gehring) (PP)
	0–8	39:03 – Zimmel (Pringle, Lassik)
	0–9	47:26 – Liang (Gehring, Mueller)
Meng (Cui) – 53:16	1–9
	1–10	54:24 – McWhorter (Liang)
Meng (Cui, Wang X.) – 58:35	2–10

20 min
Penalties
8 min
27
Shots
60

=== Fifth place game ===
26 February 2009; 19:00	Czechia	1–5 (1–1, 0–1, 0–3)	Japan	The Skating Gym of HIPE; Attendance: 2,100

Michal Nedvídek
Dušan Šafránek
Goalies
Mitsuaki Inoue
Referee:
(United States) Nick Krebsbach
Linesmen:
(United States) Chad Evers
(China) Sun Yang

	0–1	04:13 – Sakagami (Kokubo)
Nedrda (Soldán, Urban) – 10:11	1–1
	1–2	28:32 – Konno (Imajo) (PP)
	1–3	42:04 – Sato (Shigeno)
	1–4	47:23 – Kokubo (Imajo, Ebata)
	1–5	50:19 – Sakagami (Haga, Kokubo) (PP)

46 min
Penalties
18 min
51
Shots
28

=== Playoff round ===
Semifinals
1	Canada	8
4	Slovakia	1
2	Russia	7
3	Kazakhstan	1

Gold Medal
1st place, gold medalist(s)	Russia	4
2nd place, silver medalist(s)	Canada	2
Bronze Medal
3rd place, bronze medalist(s)	Slovakia	5
4	Kazakhstan	4

Source: FISU

==== Semifinal round ====
27 February 2009; 15:00	Russia	7–1 (1–0, 3–0, 3–1)	Kazakhstan	The Skating Gym of HIPE; Attendance: 1,000

Alexey Belov
Emil Garipov
Goalies
Dmitriy Malgin
Mikhail Smolnikov
Referee:
(Canada) Graham Skilliter
Linesmen:
(China) Du Qiang
(Canada) Justin Hull

Petrov (Valiullin, Berdnikov) – 12:34	1–0
Valiullin (Belukhin, Petrov) – 29:17	2–0
Zyuzin (Berdnikov, Kuokhriakov) (PP2) – 38:52	3–0
Demakov (Belukhin, Mladin) (PP) – 39:37	4–0
Tsybin (Fahrutdinov) – 42:23	5–0
Zuborev (Belukhin) – 49:37	6–0
	6–1	52:43 – Yefremov (Kachulin)
Belukhin (Petrov, Kolesnikov) – 58:03	7–1

20 min
Penalties
8 min
42
Shots
13

27 February 2009; 19:00	Canada	8–1 (3–0, 1–0, 4–1)	Slovakia	The Skating Gym of HIPE; Attendance: 1,500

Aaron Sorochan
Brant Hilton
Goalies
Lukáš Škrečko
Martin Šúrek
Referee:
(Sweden) Mikael Sjoqvist
Linesmen:
(Belgium) Chris Deweerdt
(Finland) Likka Kiilunen

Wood – 01:58	1–0
McDonald (Gillen) (PP) – 05:35	2–0
Klassen (Woolger) – 09:21	3–0
DaSilva – 26:25	4–0
Ross (Klassen) (PP) – 43:39	5–0
	5–1	43:39 – Domain (J. Babic)
DaSilva (Moore) – 49:31	6–1
Ross (Klassen, Woolger) – 50:44	7–1
Lenoski (Ross, Woolger) – 51:17	8–1

10 min
Penalties
14 min
35
Shots
27

==== Bronze medal game ====
28 February 2009; 11:00	Kazakhstan	4–5 (2–1, 0–1, 2–3)	Slovakia	Harbin Ice Hockey Gym; Attendance: 2,400

Dmitriy Malgin
Goalies
Martin Šúrek
Referee:
(United States) Nick Krebsbach
Linesmen:
(Canada) Sean Dufour
(Finland) Sakari Suominen

	0–1	02:47 – Slovák (Macejka, Trefný)
Kachulin (Antropov, Polomshnov) (PP) – 06:58	1–1
Polomshnov (Gerassimov) (PP) – 13:30	2–1
	2–2	33:21 – Slovák (Macejka, Karčák)
	2–3	42:50 – Slovák (Macejka)
	2–4	51:04 – Janísek (SH)
Vorobyov (Polkovnikov, Onichshenko) (PP) – 51:56	3–4
	3–5	53:09 – Hartmann (Domain)
Kachulin (Kurshuk) – 55:37	4–5

28 min
Penalties
22 min
32
Shots
25

==== Gold medal game ====
28 February 2009; 15:00	Canada	2–4 (1–2, 0–0, 1–2)	Russia	Harbin Ice Hockey Gym; Attendance: 5,800

Aaron Sorochan
Goalies
Emil Garipov
Referee:
(Finland) Anssi Salonen
Linesmen:
(Belgium) Chris Deweerdt
(United States) Derek Wahl

	0–1	05:38 – Valiullin (Belukhin)
DaSilva – 16:19	1–1
	1–2	19:05 – Fahrutdinov
Gillen (Lineker) (PP) – 42:48	2–2
	2–3	56:59 – Kuokhriakov (Zyuzin) (PP)
	2–4	57:45 – Kulikov (Zakiev, Kolesnikov)

14 min
Penalties
39 min
25
Shots
27

=== Scoring leaders ===
	Player	GP	G	A	Pts	PIM
(Russia)	Evgeny Belukhin	6	4	10	14	8
(Russia)	Vadim Berdnikov	6	2	11	13	41
(Russia)	Dmitry Zyuzin	6	9	2	11	0
(Russia)	Denis Fahrutdinov	6	2	9	11	8
(Russia)	Kirill Petrov	6	5	5	10	0
(Canada)	Steve DaSilva	6	5	5	10	2
(Russia)	Radik Zakiev	6	4	6	10	8
(Canada)	Steven Gillen	6	6	3	9	8
(Russia)	Marat Valiullin	6	4	5	9	8
(Canada)	Ben Kilgour	6	4	5	9	2
(Kazakhstan)	Mikhail Kachulin	6	5	3	8	4
(United States)	Johnny Liang	5	4	4	8	4
(Canada)	Kyle Ross	5	4	4	8	0
(Russia)	Konstantin Mladin	6	4	4	8	10
(Russia)	Vasiliy Tokranov	6	4	4	8	14

Source: FISU

=== Goaltenders ===
The following table includes goaltenders with more than forty percent of their team's total minutes, sorted by save percentage.

	Player	GPI	MIP	SOG	GA	SO	SVS%	GAA
(Russia)	Alexey Belov	6	196:58	61	3	4	95.08	0.91
(Canada)	Aaron Sorochan	6	291:12	117	8	1	93.16	1.65
(Russia)	Emil Garipov	6	162:34	53	4	2	92.45	1.48
(Japan)	Mitsuaki Inoue	5	267:22	191	17	0	91.10	3.81
(Kazakhstan)	Dmitriy Malgin	6	258:08	137	14	2	89.78	3.25
(Czech Republic)	Dušan Šafránek	5	188:58	67	7	2	89.55	2.22
(United States)	Stephen Yu	5	145:00	67	7	0	89.55	2.90
(South Korea)	Yoo Sung-je	5	147:53	84	10	1	88.10	4.06
(United States)	Paul Marshall	5	164:12	115	16	0	86.09	5.85
(South Korea)	Kim Yu-jin	4	157:07	128	18	0	85.94	6.87
(Slovakia)	Martin Šúrek	6	265:00	148	21	0	85.81	4.75
(United Kingdom)	Geoff Woolhouse	5	169:38	140	22	0	84.29	7.78
(United Kingdom)	Stephen Fone	5	130:17	95	17	0	82.11	7.83
(China)	Xie Ming	5	227:53	220	40	0	81.82	10.53

Source: FISU

=== Rosters ===
Rank	Team	Roster
1	Russia	Goaltenders: Alexey Belov, Emil Garipov; Defencemen: Alexey Demakov, Andrey Kolesnikov, Konstantin Mladin, Ilya Susloparov, Vasiliy Tokranov, Sergey Zuborev; Forwards: Evgeny Belukhin, Vadim Berdnikov, Denis Fahrutdinov, Azat Kalimullin, Konstantin Kulikov, Petr Kuokhriakov, Kirill Petrov, Artur Sarvarov, Dmitry Tsybin, Marat Valiullin, Radik Zakiev, Dmitry Zyuzin; Head coach: Alexandr Sokolov; Assistant coach: Alexandr Shahvorostov
2	Canada	Goaltenders: Brant Hilton, Aaron Sorochan; Defencemen: Kyle Fecho, Jason Fransoo, Travis Friedley, Stéphane Lenoski, Craig Lineker, Matt Pepe, Ryan Pottruff; Forwards: Steve DaSilva, Steven Gillen, Mike Hellyer, Reid Jorgensen, Ben Kilgour, Chad Klassen, Ian McDonald, Dustin Moore, Brett O'Malley, Kyle Ross, Torrie Wheat, Rick Wood, Brian Woolger; Head coach: Milan Dragicevic; Assistant coaches: Blaine Sautner, Eric Thurston
3	Slovakia	Goaltenders: Lukáš Škrečko, Martin Šúrek; Defencemen: Ján Galko, Stanislav Janísek, Dárius Rusnák, Ridvan Sadiki, Radovan Trefný, Tomáš Volek, Maroš Žemba; Forwards: Ján Babic, Michal Babic, Marcel Baláž, Miloš Bednár, Martin Domian, Eduard Hartmann, Matúš Kadraba, Michal Karčák, Libor Káčer, Denis Legerský, Filip Macejka, Marek Mašlonka, Martin Slovák; Head coach: Ľubomír Pokovič; Assistant coach: Igor Tóth
4	Kazakhstan	Goaltenders: Dmitriy Malgin, Mikhail Smolnikov; Defencemen: Alexandr Antropov, Yevgeniy Bolyakin, Viktor Ivashin, Alexandr Kazacheyev, Andrey Korovkin, Eduard Mazula, Leonid Metalnikov, Andrey Polkovnikov, Vitaliy Svistunov; Forwards: Mikhail Gavrilov, Alexandr Gerassimov, Alexey Grichenko, Mikhail Kachulin, Alex Kurshuk, Mikhail Lazarenko, Oleg Onichshenko, Vyacheslav Polomshnov, Konstantin Savenkov, Yakov Vorobyov, Sergey Yefremov; Head coach: Valery Kirichenko; Assistant coach: Alexandr Shimin
5	Japan	Goaltenders: Mitsuaki Inoue, Ryo Sasaki; Defencemen: Masahiro Ebina, Yosuke Haga, Kazutomo Imajo, Hayato Nakai, Ikuya Sato, Sho Sekiya, Yu Sugisawa; Forwards: Hayato Ebata, Hidenao Kokubo, Mitsuyoshi Konno, Shuhei Kuji, Shun Matsuura, Naoto Mizuuchi, Kenta Saito, Motoki Sakagami, Shunsuke Shigeno, Ryo Tanaka, Hiromichi Terao, Hiromasa Tonosaki, Shohei Yamauchi; Head coach: Mark Mahon; Assistant coach: Norio Suzuki, Teruhiko Okita
6	Czechia	Goaltenders: Michal Nedvídek, Dušan Šafránek; Defencemen: Alexandr Hegegy, Martin Iterský, Michal Kukol, Jakub Loučka, Jan Soldán, Tomáš Štryncl, Martin Ton, Lukáš Zientek; Forwards: Adam Červenka, Petr Grygar, Jiří Hanzal, Aleš Havlůj, Michal Holuša, Jiří Jakeš, Jan Kubišta, Ondřej Martiník, Vítězslav Nedrda, Martin Špok, Tomáš Urban, Tomáš Wolf; Head coach: Jaroslav Liška; Assistant coach: Jan Zachrla
7	United States	Goaltenders: Paul Marshall, Stephen Yu; Defencemen: Jonathon Biliouris, Pierce Butler, Brent Cornelius, Bradley Hoelzer, Dan Lassik, Adam Mueller, Jerrett Samp; Forwards: Daryl Dee, Lukas DeLorenzo, James Gehring, Jeremy Heredia, Kyle Krannich, Johnny Liang, Peter Majkozak, Sean McWhorter, Jason O'Bannon, Jordan Pringle, Devin Sheehan, Matthew Sweezey, Jamie Zimmel; Head coach: Joe Augustine; Assistant coach: Scott Balboni, Dave Debol
8	China	Goaltenders: Cao Longhai, Xie Ming; Defencemen: Jian Guan, Liu Liang, Qu Yidong, Sun Chao, Wang Yang, Wu Huizi, Zhao Xing; Forwards: Chen Lei, Cui Zhinan, Dong Liang, Du Chao, Fu Nan, Jiang Jun, Lang Bingyu, Liu Yingkui, Meng Qingyuan, Wang Xiaonan, Wu Qiong, Xue Tao, Zhang Weiyang; Head coach: Wang Benyu; Assistant coach: Shen Lijun
9	South Korea	Goaltenders: Kim Yu-jin, Yoo Sung-je; Defencemen: Baek Min-chul, Kim Hee-chul, Kim Min-wook, Lee Don-ku, Lee Kyung-woo, Leem Jee-min, Oh Kwang-sik; Forwards: An Sung-ho, Choi Moon-yung, Ham Jung-woo, Han Ho-taek, Jung Bung-chun, Kim Bum-jin, Kim Dong-yeon, Kim Hyun-min, Kim Hyung-joon, Park Jun-hong, Park Suk-ho, Sin Sang-woo, Suh Sin-il; Head coach: Hee Sang-moon; Assistant coach: Tae Ho-choi
10	Great Britain	Goaltenders: Stephen Fone, Geoff Woolhouse; Defencemen: Colm Cannon, Lloyd Gibson, Lee Haywood, Marcus Maynard, Tom Norton, Mark Paterson; Forwards: Oliver Barron, Stewart Bliss, Stuart Brittle, Marc Fowley, Robert Lachowicz, Nicholas Manning, Daniel Marashi, Joseph Millard, Luke Piggott, Jamie Tinsley, Mark Turner, Christopher Wilson; Head coach: Matthew Bradbury; Assistant coach: Michael Urquhart

Source: FISU

== Women ==
2009 Winter Universiade women's tournament
Tournament details
- Host country: China
- City: Harbin
- Venue: 1 (in 1 host city)
- Dates: 18–27 February 2009
- Teams: 6

Final positions
- Champions: Canada (1st title)
- Runners-up: China
- Third place: Finland
- Fourth place: Slovakia

Tournament statistics
- Games played: 20
- Goals scored: 153 (7.65 per game)
- Attendance: 38,348 (1,917 per game)
- Scoring leader: (China) Sun Rui (16 points)

The inaugural women's ice hockey tournament at the Winter Universiade was held during 18 to 27 February 2009 at Harbin Ice Hockey Gym in Harbin, Heilongjiang, China. Six national under-28 teams participated in the event, representing Canada, China, Finland, Great Britain, Japan, and Slovakia.

In the preliminary round, the six teams played a single round-robin to determine seeding for the semifinals. Teams ranked first through fourth progressed to the semifinals and the remaining teams faced off in the fifth place game. Canada swept the preliminary round, finishing the five game series with a +28 goal difference. They advanced to the semifinals trailed by China, Finland, and Slovakia, respectively.

In the fifth place match, Japan shutout Great Britain by a score of 10–0. Eight different skaters scored for Japan during the game and forward Ami Nakamura (Kokushikan University/Seibu Princess Rabbits) recorded a hat-trick.

China‘s Sun Rui (HIPE) was the leading point and goal scorer of the tournament, amassing a total of ten goals and sixteen points in seven games played. Andrea Bevan (Wilfrid Laurier Golden Hawks) of Canada was the top scoring defenseman and tournament assists leader, notching one goal and nine assists for ten points in seven games; of her nine assists, seven were primary and two were secondary.

Canadian goaltender Stacey Corfield (Manitoba Bisons) led all tournament goaltenders in save percentage (93.75%) and goals against average (0.89 GAA) while tallying nearly 65 percent of minutes played. Japanese goalie Eri Kiribuchi (Bemidji State Beavers) and Finnish goalie Anna-Kaisa Piiroinen (Laurea University of Applied Sciences/Salo HT) tied for most shutouts with two each.

=== Preliminary round ===
Standings

Pos	Team	Pld	W	OTW	OTL	L	GF	GA	GD	Pts	Qualification
1	Canada	5	5	0	0	0	33	5	+28	15	Advance to Semifinals
2	China (H)	5	3	0	1	1	19	15	+4	10	Advance to Semifinals
3	Finland	5	3	0	0	2	29	10	+19	9	Advance to Semifinals
4	Slovakia	5	2	0	0	3	20	20	0	6	Advance to Semifinals
5	Japan	5	1	1	0	3	13	15	−2	5	Fifth place game
6	Great Britain	5	0	0	0	5	2	51	−49	0	Fifth place game

Source: FISU
(H) Host

Results

18 February 2009; 10:00	Slovakia	3–5 (0–1, 3–2, 0–2)	China	Harbin Ice Hockey Gym; Attendance: 1,150

Monika Kvaková
Goalies
Jia Dandan
Referee:
(Sweden) Malin Axelsson
Linesmen:
(Canada) Kerri Rumble
(Finland) Jenni Visala

	0–1	13:25 – Sun (Zhang S., Qi) (PP2)
	0–2	20:39 – Jin (Tang, Sun)
Kapustová (Pravlíková) – 23:26	1–2
	1–3	24:56 – Jin
Pravlíková (Kapustová, Veličková) – 30:12	2–3
Matejová (Pravlíková) (PP2) – 35:25	3–3
	3–4	48:14 – Sun (Jin)
	3–5	52:42 – Jin (Tang, Sun)

14 min
Penalties
18 min
22
Shots
44

18 February 2009; 13:00	Great Britain	0–11 (0–3, 0–5, 0–3)	Canada	Harbin Ice Hockey Gym; Attendance: 848

Laura Saunders
Michaela Walker
Goalies
Melinda Choy
Referee:
(Finland) Maija Kontturi
Linesmen:
(United States) Katie Connolly
(China) Ming Gong

0–1	09:46 – Ferguson (Del Guidice, Cheverie)
0–2	13:30 – Davidson (Bevan)
0–3	18:02 – Chartrand (Provost, Webster)
0–4	24:08 – Copeland
0–5	27:18 – Boras (Bevan)
0–6	29:34 – Newton (Copeland) (PP)
0–7	33:15 – Copeland (Newton, Hottot)
0–8	34:52 – Del Guidice (Ferguson)
0–9	48:39 – Cheverie (Davidson)
0–10	50:07 – Copeland
0–11	50:59 – Hottot

6 min
Penalties
0 min
2
Shots
73

18 February 2009; 16:00	Japan	0–4 (0–2, 0–2, 0–0)	Finland	Harbin Ice Hockey Gym; Attendance: 1,500

Eri Kiribuchi
Goalies
Anna-Kaisa Piiroinen
Referee:
(Canada) France Lapratte
Linesmen:
(United States) Laura Johnson
(China) Ma Jinping

0–1	02:03 – Jalosuo (Rytkönen) (PP)
0–2	05:36 – Välimäki (M. Tuominen)
0–3	28:03 – Airola (S. Tuominen, Rytkönen) (PP)
0–4	37:38 – Rytkönen (S. Tuominen, Airola)

10 min
Penalties
14 min
12
Shots
23

19 February 2009; 12:00	Slovakia	8–1 (0–0, 6–0, 2–1)	Great Britain	Harbin Ice Hockey Gym; Attendance: 500

Monika Kvaková
Goalies
Laura Saunders
Michaela Walker
Referee:
(Canada) France Lapratte
Linesmen:
(Finland) Satu Auno
(China) Ma Jinping

Kapustová (Gajdošová) – 20:24	1–0
Jurčová (Országhová) – 23:43	2–0
Veličková (Karafiátová) – 31:33	3–0
Pravlíková (Kapustová, Gajdošová) – 34:25	4–0
Karafiátová (Pravlíková) (PP) – 37:46	5–0
Čulíková (Gápová) – 39:59	6–0
Daňková (Pravlíková) (PP) – 50:41	7–0
	7–1	52:29 – Wiggins (Butcher)
Jurčová (Výbošťoková) – 54:09	8–1

2 min
Penalties
20 min
66
Shots
9

19 February 2009; 16:00	China	2–3 GWS (0–1, 1–0, 1–1) (OT: 0–0) (SO: 0–1)	Japan	Harbin Ice Hockey Gym; Attendance: 2,500

Shi Yao
Goalies
Eri Kiribuchi
Referee:
(United States) Tara Leighton
Linesmen:
(Canada) Hélène Roy
(Finland) Jenni Visala

	0–1	11:00 – Takahashi (Okazaki, S. Shimozawa) (PP)
Sun (Jin) (PP) – 39:07	1–1
	1–2	49:19 – Uchida (Kimura, Adachi) (PP)
Jin (Zhang S.) (PP2) – 59:51	2–2

Shootout
Okazaki
12 min
Penalties
18 min
28
Shots
23

19 February 2009; 19:33	Canada	5–0 (0–0, 0–0, 5–0)	Finland	Harbin Ice Hockey Gym; Attendance: 2,100

Stacey Corfield
Goalies
Anna-Kaisa Piiroinen
Linda Selkee
Referee:
(Sweden) Malin Axelsson
Linesmen:
(United States) Kate Connolly
(China) Ming Gong

Hill (PP) – 40:28	1–0
Ferguson (Chartrand) (PP2) – 46:12	2–0
Provost (Boras) – 48:30	3–0
Davidson – 49:52	4–0
Davidson (Newton) – 50:45	5–0

8 min
Penalties
47 min
42
Shots
19

21 February 2009; 12:00	Great Britain	1–8 (0–1, 1–6, 0–1)	Japan	Harbin Ice Hockey Gym; Attendance: 1,500

Laura Saunders
Goalies
Eri Kiribuchi
Yae Unosawa
Referee:
(Finland) Maija Kontturi
Linesmen:
(United States) Laura Johnson
(Canada) Kerri Rumble

	0–1	13:46 – Ichijo (Takashima, Nakamura)
	0–2	24:20 – Ichijo
	0–3	25:11 – Takahashi (Takashima)
	0–4	32:03 – Kikuchi (Iwahara)
	0–5	34:56 – Shimodaira (Takashima) (PP)
	0–6	38:13 – Nakamura (Takashima)
	0–7	38:46 – Ogino (Takashima)
Turner – 39:02	1–7
	1–8	47:15 – Iwahara (Kikuchi)

6 min
Penalties
4 min
17
Shots
76

21 February 2009; 16:00	Canada	6–3 (1–2, 3–1, 2–0)	Slovakia	Harbin Ice Hockey Gym; Attendance: 1,800

Stacey Corfield
Melinda Choy
Goalies
Monika Kvaková
Referee:
(United States) Tara Leighton
Linesmen:
(Finland) Satu Auno
(China) Ma Jinping

	0–1	15:25 – Kapustová (Džurňáková, Országhová) (PP)
Davidson (Bevan) – 15:33	1–1
	1–2	18:25 – Kežmarská (Országhová)
Copeland (Bevan, Hottot) – 25:14	2–2
Ramsay (Boras, Davidson) (PP) – 31:40	3–2
Ramsay (Copeland, Boras) (PP) – 33:15	4–2
	4–3	39:05 – Čulíková (Džurňáková, Kapustová) (PP2)
Hottot (Del Guidice, Reeve) – 57:14	5–3
Provost (Bevan, Ironside) – 58:55	6–3

28 min
Penalties
10 min
46
Shots
23

21 February 2009; 19:33	Finland	2–3 (1–1, 1–1, 0–1)	China	Harbin Ice Hockey Gym; Attendance: 3,700

Linda Selkee
Goalies
Shi Yao
Referee:
(Canada) France Lapratte
Linesmen:
(United States) Kate Connolly
(Canada) Hélène Roy

	0–1	09:01 – Sun (Jin, Qi) (PP)
Korhonen (Gustavsen) – 12:26	1–1
Sirvio (Hallvar) (PP) – 21:32	2–1
	2–2	26:52 – Tang (Sun) (PP)
	2–3	51:21 – Jin

8 min
Penalties
8 min
29
Shots
24

22 February 2009; 12:00	Japan	1–4 (1–2, 0–1, 0–1)	Slovakia	Harbin Ice Hockey Gym; Attendance: 1,000

Eri Kiribuchi
Goalies
Monika Kvaková
Referee:
(United States) Tara Leighton
Linesmen:
(China) Ming Gong
(Finland) Jenni Visala

	0–1	02:44 – Veličková (Kapustová)
M. Shimozawa (Adachi, Iwahara) (PP) – 07:34	1–1
	1–2	10:18 – Karafiátová (Matejová) (PP)
	1–3	20:46 – Pravlíková (Kapustová)
	1–4	59:40 – Karafiátová (Pravlíková)

8 min
Penalties
10 min
13
Shots
23

22 February 2009; 16:00	Great Britain	0–16 (0–5, 0–6, 0–5)	Finland	Harbin Ice Hockey Gym; Attendance: 1,000

Laura Saunders
Michaela Walker
Goalies
Anna-Kaisa Piiroinen
Referees:
(Canada) France Lapratte
(Sweden) Malin Axelsson
Linesmen:
(Canada) Hélène Roy
(Canada) Kerri Rumble

0–1	04:36 – Korhonen (Saari)
0–2	06:05 – Rytkönen (Airola)
0–3	07:34 – Hallvar (M. Tuominen)
0–4	09:24 – Jalosuo (S. Tuominen, Rytkönen) (PP)
0–5	12:44 – M. Tuominen (Välimäki)
0–6	20:21 – Gustavsen (Välimäki)
0–7	21:31 – Rahunen (Korhonen)
0–8	22:39 – Villilä (Rytkönen) (PP)
0–9	27:41 – Stoltenberg (Villilä) (PP)
0–10	29:56 – Rytkönen (Airola)
0–11	31:27 – Saari (Korhonen)
0–12	45:49 – Kinnunen (S. Tuominen, Airola)
0–13	48:41 – Saari (Villilä, Stoltenberg) (PP)
0–14	55:42 – Stoltenberg (Villilä, Saari) (PP)
0–15	57:48 – Rahunen (Saari)
0–16	59:04 – Airola (Kinnunen, S. Tuominen)

16 min
Penalties
0 min
0
Shots
101

22 February 2009; 19:31	Canada	7–1 (2–1, 1–0, 4–0)	China	Harbin Ice Hockey Gym; Attendance: 3,300

Stacey Corfield
Goalies
Shi Yao
Referee:
(Finland) Maija Kontturi
Linesmen:
(Finland) Satu Auno
(United States) Laura Johnson

Unruh (Ramsay) – 05:30	1–0
	1–1	11:22 – Ma (Sun) (PP)
Copeland (Hottot, Newton) – 14:30	2–1
Provost (Webster, Chartrand) – 35:23	3–1
Cheverie (Del Guidice, Ferguson) – 46:03	4–1
Copeland (Chartrand) – 54:33	5–1
Ironside (Provost, Unruh) – 54:47	6–1
Ferguson (Reeve, Ramsay) (PP) – 59:30	7–1

2 min
Penalties
4 min
56
Shots
13

24 February 2009; 12:00	Finland	7–2 (4–2, 2–0, 1–0)	Slovakia	Harbin Ice Hockey Gym; Attendance: 1,500

Anna-Kaisa Piiroinen
Goalies
Monika Ďaďová
Referee:
(United States) Tara Leighton
Linesmen:
(China) Ma Jinping
(Canada) Kerri Rumble

Välimäki (Jalosuo, M. Tuominen) – 08:24	1–0
	1–1	10:59 – Jurčová (Daňková)
Rytkönen – 13:36	2–1
	2–2	17:05 – Jurčová (SH)
Rytkönen (Petäjämäki) (PP) – 17:40	3–2
Sirvio (Välimäki, M. Tuominen) – 18:23	4–2
Hallvar – 22:10	5–2
Välimäki (M. Tuominen) – 34:35	6–2
Jalosuo (Airola, Petäjämäki) – 49:57	7–2

12 min
Penalties
14 min
48
Shots
15

24 February 2009; 16:00	Canada	4–1 (1–0, 2–1, 1–0)	Japan	Harbin Ice Hockey Gym; Attendance: 1,700

Melinda Choy
Goalies
Eri Kiribuchi
Referee:
(Finland) Maija Kontturi
Linesmen:
(United States) Laura Johnson
(China) Ming Gong

Boras (Ferguson) (PP) – 18:55	1–0
Ramsay (Boras) – 21:21	2–0
	2–1	22:14 – Okazaki
Newton (Copeland, Hottot) – 31:11	3–1
Newton (Copeland, Hottot) – 53:40	4–1

4 min
Penalties
2 min
36
Shots
9

24 February 2009; 19:31	China	8–0 (4–0, 3–0, 1–0)	Great Britain	Harbin Ice Hockey Gym; Attendance: 3,500

Jia Dandan
Goalies
Laura Saunders
Referee:
(Canada) France Lapratte
Linesmen:
(United States) Kate Connolly
(Finland) Jenni Visala

Sun (Qi) (PP) – 04:41	1–0
Sun (Jin, Tang) – 06:38	2–0
Tang (Jin, Qi) – 07:58	3–0
Zhang S. (Su, Gao) – 14:57	4–0
Sun (Jin) – 33:53	5–0
Jin (Tan) (SH) – 36:42	6–0
Huang (Jiang) – 39:23	7–0
Sun (Gao, Qi) (PP) – 54:56	8–0

6 min
Penalties
12 min
89
Shots
4

=== Fifth place game ===
26 February 2009; 12:00	Japan	10–0 (6–0, 2–0, 2–0)	Great Britain	Harbin Ice Hockey Gym; Attendance: 500

Eri Kiribuchi
Yae Unosawa
Goalies
Laura Saunders
Michaela Walker
Referee:
(Canada) France Lapratte
Linesmen:
(China) Ma Jinping
(Canada) Kerri Rumble

Moriya (Ogino) – 01:31	1–0
S. Shimozawa (Shimodaira) – 03:17	2–0
Nakamura (Ogino) – 03:24	3–0
Takashima (Okazaki, Ichijo) – 09:14	4–0
Nakamura (Shimodaira) – 10:38	5–0
Okazaki – 19:03	6–0
Ichijo (Adachi, Iwahara) (PP) – 32:34	7–0
Kurata (Takeuchi, Miyata) – 36:28	8–0
Nakamura (Shimodaira, Suzuki) (PP) – 43:21	9–0
Miyata (Ichijo) – 47:48	10–0

4 min
Penalties
10 min
46
Shots
9

=== Playoff round ===
Semifinals
1	Canada	10
4	Slovakia	1
2	China	4
3	Finland	3

Gold Medal
1st place, gold medalist(s)	Canada	3
2nd place, silver medalist(s)	China	1
Bronze Medal
3rd place, bronze medalist(s)	Finland	3
4	Slovakia	2

Source: FISU

==== Semifinals ====
26 February 2009; 16:00	Canada	10–1 (2–0, 5–1, 3–0)	Slovakia	Harbin Ice Hockey Gym; Attendance: 500

Stacey Corfield
Goalies
Monika Kvaková
Referee:
(Finland) Maija Kontturi
Linesmen:
(Finland) Satu Auno
(Finland) Jenni Visala

Provost (Chartrand) – 03:11	1–0
Hill (Davidson, Cecere) – 19:59	2–0
Hill (Cecere, Davidson) – 21:17	3–0
Bevan (Newton) (PP) – 30:18	4–0
Unruh (Bevan, Ironside) (PP) – 30:18	5–0
	5–1	32:56 – Jurčová (Veličková, Pravlíková)
Copeland (Ramsay, Newton) – 33:52	6–1
Copeland (Hottot, Chartrand) (PP) – 34:09	7–1
Unruh (Boras, Ramsay) (PP) – 45:35	8–1
Copeland (Chartrand) – 52:48	9–1
Davidson (Reeve, Bevan) (PP2) – 56:21	10–1

10 min
Penalties
55 min
50
Shots
9

26 February 2009; 19:30	China	4–3 (2–0, 0–2, 2–1)	Finland	Harbin Ice Hockey Gym; Attendance: 2,800

Shi Yao
Goalies
Anna-Kaisa Piiroinen
Referee:
(United States) Tara Leighton
Linesmen:
(United States) Laura Johnson
(Canada) Hélène Roy

Jin (Tang) – 14:51	1–0
Jin (Tang, Sun) – 19:02	2–0
	2–1	22:59 – M. Tuominen (Välimäki)
	2–2	39:08 – Korhonen (Kinnunen)
	2–3	48:20 – S. Tuominen (Välimäki)
Sun (Jin) (PP) – 50:02	3–3
Sun (Yu) – 54:57	4–3

12 min
Penalties
10 min
15
Shots
24

==== Bronze medal game ====
27 February 2009; 16:00	Slovakia	2–3 (0–1, 1–1, 1–1)	Finland	Harbin Ice Hockey Gym; Attendance: 1,250

Monika Kvaková
Goalies
Anna-Kaisa Piiroinen
Referee:
(Canada) France Lapratte
Linesmen:
(United States) Kate Connolly
(Canada) Hélène Roy

	0–1	19:15 – Jalosuo (M. Tuominen, Välimäki)
	0–2	20:28 – Rajahuhta (Sirvio)
Čulíková (Jurčová, Matejová) – 21:00	1–2
	1–3	41:27 – Korhonen (Stoltenberg, Saarimäki)
Veličková (Pravlíková, Matejová) (PP) – 59:09	2–3

6 min
Penalties
8 min
14
Shots
39

==== Gold medal game ====
27 February 2009; 19:31	Canada	3–1 (1–0, 1–1, 1–0)	China	Harbin Ice Hockey Gym; Attendance: 5,700

Stacey Corfield
Goalies
Shi Yao
Referee:
(United States) Tara Leighton
Linesmen:
(Finland) Satu Auno
(United States) Laura Johnson

Chartrand (Del Guidice, Webster) – 17:17	1–0
	1–1	22:35 – Jin (Jiang, Sun) (PP)
Unruh (Provost, Bevan) – 27:09	2–1
Reeve (Bevan, Copeland) (PP) – 44:32	3–1

18 min
Penalties
6 min
39
Shots
14

=== Scoring leaders ===
	Player	GP	G	A	Pts	PIM
(China)	Sun Rui	7	10	6	16	4
(China)	Jin Fengling	7	9	7	16	10
(Canada)	Leah Copeland	7	9	5	14	10
(Slovakia)	Petra Pravlíková	7	3	7	10	12
(Canada)	Andrea Bevan	7	1	9	10	2
(Canada)	Vanessa Davidson	7	5	4	9	4
(Finland)	Elisa Rytkönen	7	5	4	9	4
(Slovakia)	Jana Kapustová	4	3	6	9	0
(Finland)	Linda Välimäki	6	3	6	9	33
(Canada)	Jennifer Newton	7	3	5	8	4
(Canada)	Cathy Chartrand	7	2	6	8	0
(Canada)	Kayla Hottot	7	2	6	8	2
(Finland)	Minttu Tuominen	7	2	6	8	2
(Canada)	Mariève Provost	7	4	3	7	4
(Canada)	Stephanie Ramsay	7	3	4	7	2

Source: FISU

Haruka Takashima (Waseda University/Iwakura Peregrine) was the leading scorer for Japan, having tallied one goal and five assists for six points and four penalty minutes in six games played. She ranked 22nd on the list of tournament scoring leaders.

Emily Turner (Sheffield Bears) and Katherine Wiggins (Sheffield Bears) tied as the top scorers representing Great Britain, with one goal each.

=== Goaltenders ===
Note: Name^ indicates goaltender with less than forty percent of their team's total minutes.

	Player	GPI	MIP	SOG	GA	SO	SVS%	GAA
(Canada)	Stacey Corfield	5	270:01	64	4	1	93.75	0.89
(Japan)	Yae Unosawa^	2	67:57	13	1	1	92.31	0.88
(China)	Shi Yao	5	305:00	171	18	0	89.47	3.54
(Japan)	Eri Kiribuchi	6	297:03	122	13	2	89.34	2.63
(China)	Jia Dandan^	2	119:56	26	3	1	88.46	1.50
(Finland)	Linda Selkee^	2	68:05	26	3	1	88.46	2.64
(United Kingdom)	Laura Saunders	6	264:15	355	45	0	87.32	10.22
(Slovakia)	Monika Kvaková	6	359:56	201	26	0	87.06	4.33
(Canada)	Melinda Choy^	3	149:59	23	3	1	86.96	1.20
(Finland)	Anna-Kaisa Piirioinen	6	351:55	96	13	2	86.46	2.22
(Slovakia)	Monika Ďaďová^	1	60:00	48	7	0	85.42	7.00
(United Kingdom)	Michaela Walker^	5	95:45	96	16	0	83.33	10.03

Source: FISU

=== Rosters ===
Rank	Team	Roster
1	Canada	Goaltenders: Melinda Choy, Stacey Corfield; Defencemen: Andrea Boras, Alyssa Cecere, Cathy Chartrand, Stephanie Ramsay, Rayanne Reeve, Kelsey Webster; Forwards: Andrea Bevan, Kori Cheverie, Leah Copeland, Vanessa Davidson, Annie Del Guidice, Brayden Ferguson, Carly Hill, Kayla Hottot, Andrea Ironside, Jennifer Newton, Mariève Provost, Courtney Unruh; Head coach: Dan Church; Assistant coaches: Shelley Coolidge, Kim Thompson
2	China	Goaltenders: Jia Dandan, Shi Yao; Defencemen: Jiang Na, Lou Yue, Qi Xueting, Tan Anqi, Wang Nan, Yu Baiwei, Zhang Shuang; Forwards: Cui Shanshan, Gao Fujin, Huang Haijing, Huo Cui, Jin Fengling, Ma Rui, Su Ziwei, Sun Rui, Tang Liang, Zhang Ben; Head coach: Paul Strople; Assistant coaches: Zhang Zhinan, Wang Fuquan
3	Finland	Goaltenders: Anna-Kaisa Piiroinen, Linda Selkee; Defencemen: Essi Hallvar, Mira Jalosuo, Tiina Saarimäki, Saija Sirvio, Jutta Stoltenberg, Minttu Tuominen, Tea Villilä; Forwards: Mia Airola, Liisa Gustavsen, Anna Kinnunen, Salla Korhonen, Minna Petäjämäki, Krista Rahunen, Annina Rajahuhta, Elisa Rytkönen, Saila Saari, Satu Tuominen, Linda Välimäki; Head coach: Hanu Saintula; Assistant coach: Jussi Melkko
4	Slovakia	Goaltenders: Monika Ďaďová, Monika Kvaková; Defencemen: Iveta Karafiátová, Barbora Kežmarská, Martina Knutová, Michaela Matejová, Petra Országhová, Veronika Sládečková, Martina Veličková; Forwards: Nikoleta Celárová, Janka Čulíková, Petra Daňková, Anna Džurňáková, Maria Gajdošová, Nikola Gápová, Petra Jurčová, Jana Kapustová, Petra Pravlíková, Jana Štofaníková, Katarina Výbošťoková; Head coach: Miroslav Karafiát; Assistant coach: Peter Gapa
5	Japan	Goaltenders: Eri Kiribuchi, Yae Unosawa; Defencemen: Ayano Ichijo, Sato Kikuchi, Kei Kimura, Misa Shimozawa, Erika Shimodaira, Asami Suzuki; Forwards: Yurie Adachi, Tomomi Iwahara, Kokoro Koyama, Tomomi Kurata, Mei Miyata, Natsumi Moriya, Ami Nakamura, Anri Ogino, Hiromi Okazaki, Saki Shimozawa, Mai Takahashi, Haruka Takashima, Aya Takeuchi, Tsukasa Uchida; Head coach: Yuji Iizuka; Assistant coach: Mark Mahon
6	Great Britain	Goaltenders: Laura Saunders, Michaela Walker; Defencemen: Hannah Carnegy-Arbuthnott, Amanda Carr, Suzanne Grieve, Lauren Halliwell, Catherine Homolka, Charlotte Willey; Forwards: Jennifer Ball, Emma Bird, Rachel Butcher, Alana Byrne, Leanne Ganney, Lydia Howton, Amy Lack, Laura Millard, Emily Turner, Katherine Wiggins; Head coach: Simon Manning; Assistant coach: Fiona King

Source: FISU

== Medalists ==
Event	Gold	Silver	Bronze
Men	Russia; Alexey Belov; Evgeny Belukhin; Vadim Berdnikov; Alexey Demakov; Denis Fahrutdinov; Emil Garipov; Azat Kalimullin; Andrey Kolesnikov; Konstantin Kulikov; Petr Kuokhriakov; Konstantin Mladin; Kirill Petrov; Artur Sarvarov; Ilya Susloparov; Vasiliy Tokranov; Dmitry Tsybin; Marat Valiullin; Radik Zakiev; Sergey Zuborev; Dmitry Zyuzin	Canada; Steve DaSilva; Kyle Fecho; Jason Fransoo; Travis Friedley; Steven Gillen; Mike Hellyer; Brant Hilton; Reid Jorgensen; Ben Kilgour; Chad Klassen; Stephan Lenoski; Craig Lineker; Ian McDonald; Dustin Moore; Brett O'Malley; Matt Pepe; Ryan Pottruff; Kyle Ross; Aaron Sorochan; Torrie Wheat; Rick Wood; Brian Woolger	Slovakia; Jan Babic; Michal Babic; Marcel Baláž; Miloš Bednár; Martin Domian; Ján Galko; Eduard Hartmann; Stanislav Janísek; Libor Káčer; Matúš Kadraba; Michal Karčák; Denis Legerský; Filip Macejka; Marek Mašlonka; Dárius Rusnák; Ridvan Sadiki; Martin Slovák; Lukas Škrečko; Martin Šúrek; Radovan Trefný; Tomáš Volek; Maroš Žemba
Women	Canada; Andrea Bevan; Andrea Boras; Alyssa Cecere; Cathy Chartrand; Kori Cheverie; Melinda Choy; Leah Copeland; Stacey Corfield; Vanessa Davidson; Annie Del Guidice; Brayden Ferguson; Carly Hill; Kayla Hottot; Andrea Ironside; Jennifer Newton; Mariève Provost; Stephanie Ramsay; Rayanne Reeve; Courtney Unruh; Kelsey Webster	China; Cui Shanshan; Gao Fujin; Huang Haijing; Huo Cui; Jia Dandan; Jiang Na; Jin Fengling; Lou Yue; Ma Rui; Qi Xueting; Shi Yao; Su Ziwei; Sun Rui; Tan Anqi; Tang Liang; Wang Nan; Yu Baiwei; Zhang Ben; Zhang Shuang	Finland; Mia Airola; Liisa Gustavsen; Essi Hallvar; Mira Jalosuo; Anna Kinnunen; Salla Korhonen; Minna Petäjämäki; Anna-Kaisa Piiroinen; Krista Rahunen; Annina Rajahuhta; Elisa Rytkönen; Saila Saari; Tiina Saarimäki; Linda Selkee; Saija Sirvio; Jutta Stoltenberg; Minttu Tuominen; Satu Tuominen; Tea Villilä; Linda Välimäki

== Medal table ==
* Host nation (China)

Rank	Nation	Gold	Silver	Bronze	Total
1	Canada	1	1	0	2
2	Russia	1	0	0	1
3	China*	0	1	0	1
4	Finland	0	0	1	1
4	Slovakia	0	0	1	1
Totals (5 entries)		2	2	2	6

== Bibliography ==
- Harbin Winter Universiade 2009 Results: Ice Hockey (PDF). FISU. 2009.
