= Ice hockey at the 2010 Winter Olympics – Women's team rosters =

These are the team rosters of the nations participating in the women's ice hockey tournament of the 2010 Winter Olympics.

== Group A ==
=== Canada ===
The following is the Canadian roster in the women's ice hockey tournament of the 2010 Winter Olympics.

Head Coach: (Canada) Melody Davidson

No.	Position	Name	Height (cm)	Weight (kg)	Birthdate	Birthplace	2009–10 team
32	G	Charline Labonté	175	78	15 October 1982	Boisbriand, Quebec	McGill Martlets
33	G	Kim St-Pierre	175	70	14 December 1978	Châteauguay, Quebec	Montreal Stars
1	G	Shannon Szabados	172	66	6 August 1986	Edmonton, Alberta	Grant MacEwan Griffins
25	D	Tessa Bonhomme	170	63	23 July 1985	Sudbury, Ontario	Calgary Oval X-Treme
3	D	Carla MacLeod	162	60	16 June 1982	Spruce Grove, Alberta	Calgary Oval X-Treme
4	D	Becky Kellar	170	70	1 January 1975	Hagersville, Ontario	Burlington Barracudas
5	D	Colleen Sostorics	162	78	17 December 1979	Kennedy, Saskatchewan	Calgary Oval X-Treme
12	D	Meaghan Mikkelson	175	74	4 January 1985	Regina, Saskatchewan	Edmonton Chimos
18	D	Catherine Ward	167	61	27 February 1987	Montreal, Quebec	McGill Martlets
2	F	Meghan Agosta	167	66	12 February 1987	Ruthven, Ontario	Mercyhurst Lakers
10	F	Gillian Apps	182	78	2 November 1983	Toronto, Ontario	Brampton Thunder
17	F	Jennifer Botterill	175	69	1 May 1979	Winnipeg, Manitoba	Mississauga Chiefs
16	F	Jayna Hefford – A	165	63	14 May 1977	Kingston, Ontario	Brampton Thunder
21	F	Haley Irwin	170	74	6 June 1988	Thunder Bay, Ontario	Minnesota Duluth Bulldogs
6	F	Rebecca Johnston	170	61	24 September 1989	Sudbury, Ontario	Cornell Big Red
27	F	Gina Kingsbury	172	62	26 November 1981	Uranium City, Saskatchewan	Calgary Oval X-Treme
13	F	Caroline Ouellette – A	180	78	25 May 1979	Montreal, Quebec	Montreal Stars
7	F	Cherie Piper	167	75	29 June 1981	Toronto, Ontario	Calgary Oval X-Treme
29	F	Marie-Philip Poulin	167	73	28 March 1991	Beauceville, Quebec	Dawson Blues
26	F	Sarah Vaillancourt	167	63	8 May 1985	Sherbrooke, Quebec	Harvard Crimson
22	F	Hayley Wickenheiser – C	177	77	12 August 1978	Shaunavon, Saskatchewan	Eskilstuna Linden

=== Slovakia ===
The following is the Slovak roster in the women's ice hockey tournament of the 2010 Winter Olympics.

Position	Name	Height	Weight	Birthdate	Birthplace	2009–10 team
G	Jana Budajová	166	53	16 November 1992	Liptovský Mikuláš	HK Poprad
G	Monika Kvaková	164	58	15 December 1988	Žiar nad Hronom	HC Slovan Bratislava
G	Zuzana Tomčíková	179	72	23 April 1988	Zvolen	Bemidji State Beavers
D	Petra Babiaková	175	70	27 July 1977	Zvolen	HC Slovan Bratislava
D	Barbora Brémová	168	60	24 August 1991	Košice	HC Slovan Bratislava
D	Iveta Karafiátová – C	178	75	14 May 1988	Bratislava	Linköpings HC
D	Michaela Matejová	169	57	2 March 1986	Martin	SC Reinach
D	Petra Országhová	168	58	7 April 1981	Banská Bystrica	HC Slovan Bratislava
D	Edita Raková	171	62	18 May 1978	Humenné	HC Slovan Bratislava
F	Natalie Babonyová	175	70	22 October 1983	Oshawa, Canada	Toronto Crush
F	Nikoleta Celárová	168	60	27 February 1983	Kežmarok	HC Slovan Bratislava
F	Janka Čulíková	178	75	30 June 1983	Martin	HK Spišská Nová Ves
F	Nicol Čupková	169	57	4 November 1992	Košice	HC Slovan Bratislava
F	Anna Džurňáková – A	168	58	24 January 1983	Kežmarok	HC Slovan Bratislava
F	Nikola Gápová	171	62	19 June 1989	Poprad	HC Slovan Bratislava
F	Maria Herichová	175	70	12 June 1990	Poprad	HC Slovan Bratislava
F	Petra Jurčová	168	60	22 June 1987	Košice	HC Slovan Bratislava
F	Jana Kapustová – A	178	75	11 August 1983	Žilina	Tornado Moscow
F	Zuzana Moravčíková	169	57	23 October 1980	Ružomberok	HC Slovan Bratislava
F	Petra Pravlíková	168	58	4 June 1985	Levoča	Tornado Moscow
F	Martina Veličková	171	62	17 February 1989	Prešov	HC Slovan Bratislava

=== Sweden ===
The following is the Swedish roster in the women's ice hockey tournament of the 2010 Winter Olympics.

Position	Name	Height	Weight	Birthdate	Birthplace	2009–10 team
G	Sara Grahn	171 cm (5 ft 7 1/2 in)	71 kg (157 lb; 11.2 st)	25 September 1988	Örebro	Linköpings HC
G	Valentina Lizana	170 cm (5 ft 7 in)	68 kg (150 lb; 10.7 st)	30 March 1990	Trångsund	AIK
G	Kim Martin	166 cm (5 ft 5 1/2 in)	66 kg (146 lb; 10.4 st)	28 February 1986	Stockholm	Minnesota Duluth Bulldogs
D	Emilia Andersson	175 cm (5 ft 9 in)	73 kg (161 lb; 11.5 st)	31 August 1988	Stockholm	Segeltorps IF
D	Gunilla Andersson	169 cm (5 ft 6 1/2 in)	69 kg (152 lb; 10.9 st)	26 April 1975	Skutskär	Segeltorps IF
D	Jenni Asserholt – A	172 cm (5 ft 7 1/2 in)	73 kg (161 lb; 11.5 st)	8 April 1988	Örebro	Linköpings HC
D	Emma Eliasson	166 cm (5 ft 5 1/2 in)	70 kg (150 lb; 11 st)	12 June 1989	Kiruna	Brynäs IF
D	Frida Nevalainen	165 cm (5 ft 5 in)	64 kg (141 lb; 10.1 st)	27 January 1987	Umeå	Modo Hockey
D	Emma Nordin	168 cm (5 ft 6 in)	69 kg (152 lb; 10.9 st)	22 March 1991	Örnsköldsvik	Modo Hockey
F	Tina Enström	166 cm (5 ft 5 1/2 in)	64 kg (141 lb; 10.1 st)	23 March 1991	Örnsköldsvik	Modo Hockey
F	Elin Holmlöv	173 cm (5 ft 8 in)	73 kg (161 lb; 11.5 st)	8 May 1987	Knivsta	Segeltorps IF
F	Erika Holst – C	179 cm (5 ft 10 1/2 in)	82 kg (181 lb; 12.9 st)	8 April 1979	Varberg	Segeltorps IF
F	Isabelle Jordansson	170 cm (5 ft 7 in)	70 kg (150 lb; 11 st)	8 March 1991	Danderyd	AIK
F	Klara Myrén	172 cm (5 ft 7 1/2 in)	69 kg (152 lb; 10.9 st)	25 May 1991	Borlänge	Leksands IF
F	Cecilia Östberg	166 cm (5 ft 5 1/2 in)	64 kg (141 lb; 10.1 st)	15 January 1991	Leksand	Leksands IF
F	Maria Rooth – A	176 cm (5 ft 9 1/2 in)	72 kg (159 lb; 11.3 st)	2 November 1979	Ängelholm	AIK
F	Danijela Rundqvist	178 cm (5 ft 10 in)	75 kg (165 lb; 11.8 st)	26 September 1984	Stockholm	AIK
F	Frida Svedin Thunström	172 cm (5 ft 7 1/2 in)	75 kg (165 lb; 11.8 st)	4 November 1989	Sundsvall	Modo Hockey
F	Katarina Timglas	168 cm (5 ft 6 in)	63 kg (139 lb; 9.9 st)	24 November 1985	Malmö	AIK
F	Erica Udén Johansson	170 cm (5 ft 7 in)	69 kg (152 lb; 10.9 st)	20 July 1989	Sundsvall	Segeltorps IF
F	Pernilla Winberg	165 cm (5 ft 5 in)	63 kg (139 lb; 9.9 st)	24 February 1989	Limhamn	Segeltorps IF

=== Switzerland ===
The following is the Swiss roster in the women's ice hockey tournament of the 2010 Winter Olympics.

Position	Name	Height (cm)	Weight (kg)	Birthdate	Birthplace	2009–10 team
G	Sophie Anthamatten	172	74	26 July 1991	Visp	EHC Saastal
G	Florence Schelling	174	68	9 March 1989	Zürich	Northeastern Huskies
G	Dominique Slongo	160	53	13 October 1988	Bern	EHC Brandis
D	Laura Benz	170	57	25 August 1992	Zürich	EHC Winterthur
D	Angela Frautschi	169	73	5 June 1987	Interlaken	ZSC Lions
D	Julia Marty – A	170	72	16 April 1988	Nussbaumen	Northeastern Huskies
D	Lucrèce Nussbaum	173	67	7 October 1986	Scherzingen	St. Thomas Tommies
D	Claudia Riechsteiner	168	65	3 January 1986	Sursee	SC Reinach
D	Sandra Thalmann	162	66	18 December 1992	Basel	EHC Basel
D	Stefanie Wyss	164	62	19 October 1985	Bern	EV Bomo Thun
F	Sara Benz	163	54	25 August 1992	Zürich	EHC Winterthur
F	Nicole Bullo	160	54	18 July 1987	Bellinzona	HC Lugano
F	Melanie Häfliger	160	52	29 September 1982	Schenkon	SC Reinach
F	Kathrin Lehmann – C	172	70	27 February 1980	Zürich	AIK
F	Darcia Leimgruber	162	62	19 May 1989	Basel	Maine Black Bears
F	Stefanie Marty	168	70	16 April 1988	Nussbaumen	Syracuse Orange
F	Christine Meier – A	169	68	24 May 1986	Bülach	ZSC Lions
F	Rahel Michielin	165	52	11 October 1990	Frauenfeld	ZSC Lions
F	Katrin Nabholz	167	57	3 April 1986	Basel	ZSC Lions
F	Anja Stiefel	160	56	9 August 1990	Frauenfeld	SC Reinach
F	Sabrina Zollinger	162	65	27 March 1993	Zürich	EHC Winterthur

== Group B ==
=== China ===
The following is the Chinese roster in the women's ice hockey tournament of the 2010 Winter Olympics.

Position	Name	Height	Weight	Birthdate	Birthplace	2009–10 team
G	Han Danni	165	58	9 January 1991	Harbin	Qiqihar
G	Jia Dandan	163	55	5 May 1982	Harbin	Harbin
G	Shi Yao	178	70	13 January 1987	Harbin	Harbin
D	Jiang Na	174	75	18 October 1988	Harbin	Harbin
D	Liu Zhixin	174	68	25 April 1993	Qiqihar	Qiqihar
D	Lou Yue	160	60	22 April 1987	Harbin	Harbin
D	Qi Xueting	158	58	7 November 1986	Harbin	Harbin
D	Tan Anqi	175	67	10 June 1986	Harbin	Harbin
D	Wang Nan	164	67	22 April 1988	Harbin	Harbin
D	Yu Baiwei	166	68	17 July 1988	Harbin	Harbin
D	Zhang Shuang	162	58	7 March 1987	Harbin	Harbin
F	Cui Shanshan	177	67	8 May 1987	Harbin	Harbin
F	Gao Fujin	162	65	15 July 1984	Harbin	Harbin
F	Huang Haijing	172	72	3 July 1988	Harbin	Harbin
F	Huo Cui	160	54	13 September 1988	Harbin	Harbin
F	Jin Fengling – A	166	56	20 November 1982	Harbin	Harbin
F	Ma Rui	172	69	29 March 1989	Harbin	Harbin
F	Su Ziwei	162	65	9 December 1984	Harbin	Harbin
F	Sun Rui – A	169	60	14 May 1982	Harbin	Harbin
F	Tang Liang	163	54	26 August 1985	Harbin	Harbin
F	Wang Linuo – C	160	57	28 August 1979	Harbin	Harbin
F	Zhang Ben	170	61	22 July 1985	Harbin	Harbin
F	Zhang Mengying	166	55	22 December 1993	Qiqihar	Qiqihar

=== Finland ===
The following is the Finnish roster in the women's ice hockey tournament of the 2010 Winter Olympics.

Position	Name	Height	Weight	Birthdate	Birthplace	2009–10 team
G	Mira Kuisma	168	65	6 May 1987	Kuopio	Oulun Kärpät
G	Noora Räty	164	68	29 May 1989	Espoo	Minnesota Golden Gophers
G	Anna Vanhatalo	178	65	29 February 1984	Helsinki	Espoo Blues
D	Jenni Hiirikoski – A	161	60	30 March 1987	Lempäälä	Ilves Tampere
D	Emma Laaksonen – C	159	59	17 December 1981	Washington, D.C., United States	Espoo Blues
D	Rosa Lindstedt	186	78	24 January 1988	Ylöjärvi	Ilves Tampere
D	Terhi Mertanen	166	68	4 April 1981	Joensuu	Espoo Blues
D	Heidi Pelttari	166	69	2 August 1985	Tampere	Ilves Tampere
D	Mariia Posa	164	58	21 February 1988	Hyvinkää	Minnesota Duluth Bulldogs
D	Saija Sirviö	172	62	29 December 1982	Oulu	Oulun Kärpät
F	Anne Helin	170	68	28 January 1987	Helsinki	Oulun Kärpät
F	Venla Hovi	169	62	28 October 1987	Tampere	Ilves Tampere
F	Michelle Karvinen	166	70	27 March 1990	Rødovre, Denmark	HC Rødovre
F	Annina Rajahuhta	164	62	8 March 1989	Helsinki	Ilves Tampere
F	Karoliina Rantamäki	163	65	23 February 1978	Espoo	SKIF Nizhny Novgorod
F	Mari Saarinen	172	67	30 July 1981	Kangasala	Ilves Tampere
F	Nina Tikkinen	170	67	6 February 1987	Salo	Minnesota State Mavericks
F	Minnamari Tuominen	165	67	26 June 1990	Helsinki	Ohio State Buckeyes
F	Saara Tuominen – A	169	65	1 January 1986	Ylöjärvi	Minnesota Duluth Bulldogs
F	Marjo Voutilainen	168	70	22 March 1981	Kuopio	Espoo Blues
F	Linda Välimäki	165	62	31 May 1990	Ylöjärvi	Ilves Tampere

=== Russia ===
The following is the Russian roster in the women's ice hockey tournament of the 2010 Winter Olympics.

Head coach: (Russia) Valentin Gureev Assistant coach: (Russia) Alexei Chistyakov

No.	Pos.	Name	Height	Weight	Birthdate	Birthplace	2009–10 team
1	G	Anna Prugova	1.74 m (5 ft 9 in)	62 kg (137 lb)	20 November 1993	Khabarovsk	(Russia) Tornado Dmitrov
4	D	Alena Khomich	1.68 m (5 ft 6 in)	55 kg (121 lb)	26 February 1981	Pervouralsk, Soviet Union	(Russia) SKIF Nizhny Novgorod
7	F	Olga Sosina	1.60 m (5 ft 3 in)	66 kg (146 lb)	27 July 1992	Almetyevsk	(Russia) SKIF Nizhny Novgorod
8	F	Iya Gavrilova – A	1.73 m (5 ft 8 in)	67 kg (148 lb)	3 September 1987	Krasnoyarsk, Soviet Union	(Russia) Tornado Dmitrov
9	F	Alexandra Vafina	1.68 m (5 ft 6 in)	57 kg (126 lb)	28 July 1990	Almaty, Kazakh SSR, Soviet Union	(Russia) Fakel Chelyabinsk
11	F	Marina Sergina	1.68 m (5 ft 6 in)	68 kg (150 lb)	2 March 1986	Polyarnye Zori, Soviet Union	(Russia) Tornado Dmitrov
13	D	Kristina Petrovskaya	1.70 m (5 ft 7 in)	64 kg (141 lb)	3 June 1980	Moscow, Soviet Union	(Russia) Tornado Dmitrov
15	D	Olga Permyakova – A	1.71 m (5 ft 7 in)	67 kg (148 lb)	12 April 1982	Chelyabinsk, Soviet Union	(Russia) Tornado Dmitrov
17	F	Yekaterina Smolentseva – C	1.76 m (5 ft 9 in)	65 kg (143 lb)	15 September 1981	Pervouralsk, Soviet Union	(Russia) Tornado Dmitrov
20	G	Irina Gashennikova	1.64 m (5 ft 5 in)	66 kg (146 lb)	11 May 1975	Pushkino, Soviet Union	(Russia) Tornado Dmitrov
22	F	Yulia Deulina	1.73 m (5 ft 8 in)	62 kg (137 lb)	14 April 1984	Krasnogorsk, Soviet Union	(Russia) SKIF Nizhny Novgorod
23	F	Tatiana Burina	1.65 m (5 ft 5 in)	70 kg (150 lb)	20 March 1980	Novosibirsk, Soviet Union	(Russia) Tornado Dmitrov
25	F	Yekaterina Lebedeva	1.66 m (5 ft 5 in)	66 kg (146 lb)	14 September 1989	Sverdlovsk, Soviet Union	(Russia) Dinamo Yekaterinburg
26	D	Zoya Polunina	1.70 m (5 ft 7 in)	65 kg (143 lb)	12 June 1991	Bogoroditsk, Soviet Union	(Russia) Tornado Dmitrov
28	F	Svetlana Terentieva	1.63 m (5 ft 4 in)	69 kg (152 lb)	25 September 1983	Pervouralsk, Soviet Union	(Russia) SKIF Nizhny Novgorod
29	F	Tatiana Sotnikova	1.67 m (5 ft 6 in)	59 kg (130 lb)	20 January 1981	Moscow, Soviet Union	(Russia) SKIF Nizhny Novgorod
30	G	Mariya Onolbayeva	1.78 m (5 ft 10 in)	78 kg (172 lb)	25 December 1978	Murmansk, Soviet Union	(Russia) Fakel Chelyabinsk
34	D	Svetlana Tkacheva	1.70 m (5 ft 7 in)	63 kg (139 lb)	3 November 1984	Moscow, Soviet Union	(Russia) SKIF Nizhny Novgorod
44	D	Alexandra Kapustina	1.66 m (5 ft 5 in)	74 kg (163 lb)	7 April 1984	Pervouralsk, Soviet Union	(Russia) SKIF Nizhny Novgorod
91	F	Yekaterina Ananina	1.72 m (5 ft 8 in)	62 kg (137 lb)	13 June 1991	Sverdlovsk, Soviet Union	(Russia) Spartak-Merkury Yekaterinburg
95	D	Inna Dyubanok	1.66 m (5 ft 5 in)	63 kg (139 lb)	20 February 1990	Mozhaysk, Soviet Union	(Russia) Tornado Dmitrov

=== United States ===
The following is the American roster in the women's ice hockey tournament of the 2010 Winter Olympics.

Head coach: (United States) Mark Johnson Assistant coaches: (United States) Dave Flint, (United States) Jodi McKenna

No.	Pos.	Name	Height	Weight	Birthdate	Birthplace	2009–10 team
1	G	Molly Schaus	174 cm (5 ft 9 in)	67 kg (148 lb)	July 29, 1988 (aged 21)	Natick, Massachusetts	Boston College Eagles
2	F	Erika Lawler	152 cm (5 ft 0 in)	59 kg (130 lb)	5 February 1987 (aged 23)	Fitchburg, Massachusetts	Wisconsin Badgers
4	D	Angela Ruggiero – A	175 cm (5 ft 9 in)	87 kg (192 lb)	3 January 1980 (aged 30)	Los Angeles, California	Harvard Crimson
5	F	Karen Thatcher	174 cm (5 ft 9 in)	74 kg (163 lb)	29 February 1984 (aged 25)	Blaine, Washington	Providence Friars
7	F	Monique Lamoureux	168 cm (5 ft 6 in)	71 kg (157 lb)	3 July 1989 (aged 20)	Grand Forks, North Dakota	North Dakota Fighting Sioux
8	D	Caitlin Cahow	163 cm (5 ft 4 in)	71 kg (157 lb)	20 May 1985 (aged 24)	New Haven, Connecticut	Harvard Crimson
9	D	Molly Engstrom	175 cm (5 ft 9 in)	81 kg (179 lb)	1 March 1983 (aged 26)	Siren, Wisconsin	Wisconsin Badgers
10	F	Meghan Duggan	175 cm (5 ft 9 in)	74 kg (163 lb)	3 September 1987 (aged 22)	Danvers, Massachusetts	Wisconsin Badgers
11	D	Lisa Chesson	169 cm (5 ft 7 in)	69 kg (152 lb)	18 August 1986 (aged 23)	Plainfield, Illinois	Ohio State Buckeyes
12	F	Jenny Potter – A	163 cm (5 ft 4 in)	66 kg (146 lb)	12 January 1979 (aged 31)	Edina, Minnesota	Minnesota Golden Gophers
13	F	Julie Chu – A	174 cm (5 ft 9 in)	67 kg (148 lb)	13 March 1982 (aged 27)	Bridgeport, Connecticut	Harvard Crimson
16	F	Kelli Stack	165 cm (5 ft 5 in)	59 kg (130 lb)	13 January 1988 (aged 22)	Brooklyn Heights, Ohio	Boston College Eagles
17	F	Jocelyne Lamoureux	168 cm (5 ft 6 in)	70 kg (150 lb)	3 July 1989 (aged 20)	Grand Forks, North Dakota	North Dakota Fighting Sioux
19	F	Gigi Marvin	174 cm (5 ft 9 in)	75 kg (165 lb)	7 March 1987 (aged 22)	Warroad, Minnesota	Minnesota Golden Gophers
20	F	Natalie Darwitz – C	160 cm (5 ft 3 in)	62 kg (137 lb)	13 October 1983 (aged 26)	Eagan, Minnesota	Minnesota Golden Gophers
21	F	Hilary Knight	178 cm (5 ft 10 in)	78 kg (172 lb)	12 July 1989 (aged 20)	Hanover, New Hampshire	Wisconsin Badgers
22	D	Kacey Bellamy	174 cm (5 ft 9 in)	65 kg (143 lb)	22 April 1987 (aged 22)	Westfield, Massachusetts	New Hampshire Wildcats
23	D	Kerry Weiland	163 cm (5 ft 4 in)	64 kg (141 lb)	18 October 1980 (aged 29)	Palmer, Alaska	Wisconsin Badgers
27	F	Jinelle Zaugg-Siergiej	183 cm (6 ft 0 in)	82 kg (181 lb)	27 March 1986 (aged 23)	Eagle River, Wisconsin	Wisconsin Badgers
29	G	Brianne McLaughlin	174 cm (5 ft 9 in)	59 kg (130 lb)	20 June 1987 (aged 22)	Sheffield, Ohio	Robert Morris Colonials
31	G	Jessie Vetter	174 cm (5 ft 9 in)	77 kg (170 lb)	19 December 1985 (aged 24)	Cottage Grove, Wisconsin	Wisconsin Badgers

== See also ==
- Ice hockey at the 2010 Winter Olympics – Men's team rosters
