= Žemba =

Žemba, female Žembová , is a Slovak surname. Notable people with the surname include:

- Maroš Žemba (born 1986), Slovak ice hockey player
- Vladimír Žemba (born 1988), Slovak ice hockey player

== See also ==
- Zemba
