= Ziuzina =

Populated place in Belarus

Coordinates: 55°30′00″N 028°58′00″E

Ziuzina (Belarusian: Зюзіна) is a populated place in Belarus. Not to be mistaken with Zyuzino, Russia.

== See also ==
- Polotsk
