= Zyuzin =

Zyuzin (Russian: Зюзин) is a Russian surname. Notable people with the surname include:

- Andrei Zyuzin (born 1978), Russian ice hockey player
- Dmitri Zyuzin (born 1987), Russian ice hockey player
- Igor Zyuzin (born 1960), Russian businessman
- Maksim Zyuzin (born 1986), Russian footballer

== See also ==
- Zyuzino (disambiguation)
