= Trefný =

Trefný is a Czech surname. Notable people with the surname include:

- Jakub Trefný (born 1981), Czech ice hockey player
- Radovan Trefný (born 1987), Slovak ice hockey player
- Otto Trefný (1932–2019), Czech medical doctor and politician
