= Michaela Matejová =

Slovak ice hockey player

- Born: 2 March 1986 (age 39); Martin, Czechoslovakia
- Height: 169 cm (5 ft 7 in)
- Weight: 57 kg (126 lb; 9 st 0 lb)
- Position: Defence
- Shot: Left
- Played for: HC Slovan Bratislava; Oulun Kärpät; SC Reinach
- National team: Slovakia
- Playing career: 2004–2013

Michaela Matejová (born 2 March 1986) is a Slovak retired ice hockey defenseman and former member of the Slovak national ice hockey team.

== Playing career ==
Matejová's senior club career began with the women's representative team of HC Slovan Bratislava during the 2002–03 season of the Slovak 1. liga žien ('1st Women's League') and she remained with the team through the 2007–08 season. HC Slovan also began participating in the Elite Women's Hockey League (EWHL) during the 2005–06 season, and Matejová was an EWHL Champion with the team in 2006 and 2007.

At age 22, she opted to play abroad and signed with Oulun Kärpät Naiset in Finland's top league, the Naisten SM-sarja (rebranded as Naisten Liiga in 2017). The only import player on the team's otherwise Finnish 2008–09 roster, Matejová counted among her teammates Olympian Saija Tarkki and future Olympians Anne Helin, Satu Kiipeli, Mira Kuisma, and Mira Jalosuo, in addition to a number of other Finnish national team players. Her production ranked third for Kärpät defensemen – trailing only Tarkki and Jalosuo – with 2 goals and 5 assists for 7 points in 22 games played. After finishing the regular season in fourth place, Kärpät lost the Naisten SM-sarja bronze medal match to HPK Kiekkonaiset in overtime.

Continuing to push her development in the 2009–10 season, she signed with the women's representative team of SC Reinach in the Swiss Leistungsklasse A (LKA; known as SWHL A during 2014–2019 and Women's League since 2019). She was once again the only import player on the team's roster, playing alongside Swiss 2010 Olympians Melanie Häfliger, Claudia Riechsteiner, and Anja Stiefel, and future Swiss ice hockey icon Lara Stalder, who was fifteen years old at the time. She tallied a goal and 4 assists for 5 points in fifteen games played, as SC Reinach finished the regular season fourth in the standings. Reinach achieved an overtime victory against DHC Langenthal in the bronze medal game to claim third place medals in the LKA Championship.

=== International play ===
Matejová represented Slovakia at six IIHF Women's World Championship tournaments across three divisions. Her first appearance with the senior national team came at the Division II tournament in 2005. She was one of Slovakia's top scoring defensemen at the Division II tournament in 2007, netting 2 goals and 2 assists for 4 points in five games played and contributing to the team's promotion to Division I.

In 2008, she participated in the pre-qualification and qualification tournaments for the 2010 Winter Olympics, at which Slovakia qualified for the Olympic women's ice hockey tournament for the first time. She also played in the 2008 IIHF Women's World Championship Division I, recording an assist in five games played.

Representing Slovakia with the national under-25 ice hockey team in the women's ice hockey tournament at the 2009 Winter Universiade in Harbin, Matejová tallied 4 points in seven games played, with a goal and 3 assists. Later that year, she notched an assist at the 2009 IIHF Women's World Championship Division I, as Slovakia earned their first promotion to the Top Division tournament.

As a part of the Slovak delegation at the 2010 Winter Olympics in Vancouver, Matejová played in all four of Slovakia's matches in the women's ice hockey tournament. She also participated in the 2010 and 2014 Olympic qualification tournaments.

In Slovakia's Top Division debut at the 2011 IIHF Women's World Championship, Matejová was one of only six Slovak players to record a point during the tournament. She earned a primary assist on Iveta Karafiátová's equalizing goal against Kazakhstan in game two of the relegation round, which pushed the game into overtime before Martina Veličková scored in the shootout to win the game and retain Slovakia's place in the Top Division.

After sitting out the 2011–12 international season, Matejová appeared in the qualification tournament for the 2014 Winter Olympics, however the team did not qualify. Her last major event with the national team was the Division I Group A tournament of the 2013 IIHF Women's World Championship, at which she was Slovakia’s top scoring defenseman with 2 goals and an assist for 3 points in five games played.

== Career statistics ==
Year	Team	Event	Result	GP	G	A	Pts	PIM
2005	Slovakia	WW D2	3rd	4	0	0	0	0
2007	Slovakia	WW D2	1st	5	2	2	4	6
2008	Slovakia	WW D1	2nd	5	0	1	1	4
2008	Slovakia	OGQ	Q	6	2	2	4	6
2009	Slovakia U25	Uni	4th	7	1	3	4	6
2009	Slovakia	WW D1	1st	5	0	1	1	2
2010	Slovakia	OG	8th	4	0	0	0	0
2011	Slovakia	WW	7th	5	0	1	1	4
2013	Slovakia	OGQ	DNQ	3	0	0	0	0
2013	Slovakia	WW D1A	3rd	5	2	1	3	2
Totals				33	4	6	10	18
