= Satu Tuominen =

Finnish ice hockey player

- Born: 19 November 1985 (age 40) Vantaa, Finland
- Height: 163 cm (5 ft 4 in)
- Weight: 60 kg (132 lb; 9 st 6 lb)
- Position: Forward
- Shot: Left
- Played for: Espoo Blues; APV Alavus; Team Oriflame
- National team: Finland
- Playing career: 2001–2016
Medal record
World Championship
Bronze medal – third place	2004 Canada
Bronze medal – third place	2009 Finland
Universiade
Bronze medal – third place	2009 Harbin	Ice hockey

Satu Tuominen (born 19 November 1985) is a Finnish retired ice hockey player. She played in more than 110 international matches with the Finnish national team, won two IIHF Women's World Championship bronze medals, and participated in the women's ice hockey tournament at the 2006 Winter Olympics. With the Finnish national team, she won IIHF Worlds bronze medals in 2004 and 2009.

== Playing career ==
Tuominen spent the entirety of her club career in Finland and played eleven seasons in the top-tier Naisten SM-sarja (NSMs; renamed Naisten Liiga in 2017). She made her Naisten SM-sarja debut with the Espoo Blues in the 2001–02 Naisten SM-sarja season and went on to play the next seven seasons with the team, winning the Finnish Championship seven times across her eight seasons with the club.

She joined Alavuden Peli-Veikot (APV) in the 2009–10 Naisten SM-sarja season, playing in two regular season games and eleven games of the post-season relegation series. After two seasons with the women's representative team of S-Kiekko in the third-tier Naisten Suomi-sarja, Tuominen returned to the Naisten SM-sarja as a player for Team Oriflame in the 2012–13 and 2013–14 seasons.
