= Essi Sievers =

Finnish ice hockey player

- Born: 2 April 1983 (age 43) Oulu, Finland
- Height: 169 cm (5 ft 7 in)
- Weight: 65 kg (143 lb; 10 st 3 lb)
- Position: Defense
- Shot: Right
- Played for: Oulun Kärpät; Espoo Blues; OSC Eisladies Berlin
- National team: Finland
- Playing career: 1999–2014
Medal record
World Championship
Bronze medal – third place	2011 Switzerland
Universiade
Silver medal – second place	2011 Erzurum	Ice hockey
Bronze medal – third place	2009 Harbin	Ice hockey

Essi Sievers née Hallvar (born 2 April 1983) is a Finnish retired ice hockey defenceman. She played 91 international matches with the Finnish national team and won bronze at the 2011 IIHF Women's World Championship. Sievers competed at the elite club level for 15 seasons; she played 14 seasons in the Finnish Naisten SM-sarja and one season in the German Women's Ice Hockey Bundesliga (DFEL).

== Playing career ==
Sivers began her career at age 16 with Oulun Kärpät in the Naisten SM-sarja, playing in all 26 of the 1999–2000 regular season games. She spent three seasons with Kärpät and won two silver medals (2000, 2001) and one bronze medal (2002) in the Women's Finnish Championship (SM) with the team.

For the 2002–03 season, Sievers joined the Espoo Blues. She went on to play eleven seasons with the Blues (2002-2010 and 2011–2014) and served as team captain for the 2007–08, 2008–09, and 2011–12 seasons. The Blues were Finnish Champions eight times during Sievers’ tenure, winning gold in 2003, 2004, 2005, 2007, 2008, 2009, 2013, and 2014; they won silver in 2010 and bronze in 2006. The team also found success at the IIHF European Women's Champions Cup (EWCC) where they won silver medals in 2005, 2007–08, and 2009–10, and bronze medals in 2008-09 and 2013–14. As of August 2019, Sievers remains fourth on the list of franchise all-time games played with 250 games played as a Blue.

For the 2010–11 season, Sievers played with the OSC Eisladies Berlin in the German Women's Ice Hockey League (DFEL), where she posted a career high average of 1.23 points per game.

Sievers played a total of 314 regular season games in the SM-sarja and posted 75 goals and 121 assists for 196 total points. She also played in 104 SM-sarja playoff games with ten goals and 24 assists for 34 total points. She ended her career having won eight Finnish Championship (SM) titles, three SM silver medals, two SM bronze, three EWCC silver, and two EWCC bronze.

== International play ==
With the Finnish national team Sievers played 91 international matches and scored two goals and 13 assists (15 points). She played at the World Championship in 2011, when Finland won bronze, and in 2012, when Finland finished fourth.

== Bibliography ==
Significant content in this article is translated from the existing Finnish Wikipedia article at fi:Essi Sievers; see its history for attribution.

- Kallioniemi, Riku, ed. (2017). Jääkiekkokirja 2017-2018: Suomen Jääkiekkoliiton ja SM-liigan Virallinen Kausijulkaisu [Ice Hockey Book 2017-2018: Official Annual Publication of the Finnish Ice Hockey Association and the Liiga] (in Finnish). Finnish Ice Hockey Association & Liiga. ISBN 6418616223326.
