= 2009 Universiade =

2009 Universiade may refer to:

- 2009 Summer Universiade, which was held in Belgrade, Serbia
- 2009 Winter Universiade, which was held in Harbin, China
