= Denis Legerský =

Slovak ice hockey player and coach

- Born: 25 March 1987 (age 39) Liptovský Mikuláš, Czechoslovakia
- Height: 1.86 m (6 ft 1 in)
- Weight: 89 kg (196 lb; 14 st 0 lb)
- Position: Left wing
- Shot: Right
- Played for: MHk 32 Liptovský Mikuláš; İzmir Büyükşehir Belediyesi GSK; Başkent Yıldızları; HC Dukla Senica; HK Ružinov 99 Bratislava; MHK Ružomberok
- Current U15-Elit coach Current U17-Elit coach Current U20-Elit coach: HC Davos U15 (asst.); HC Davos U17 (skills); HC Davos U20 (skills)
- Coached for: HC Banská Bystrica U20; MHk 32 Liptovský Mikuláš U18; MHk 32 Liptovský Mikuláš U20; Draci Liptovský Mikuláš U16; Turkey; Başkent Yıldızları
- Playing career: c. 2003–2020
- Coaching career: 2012–present

Denis Legerský (born 25 March 1987) is a Slovak ice hockey player and coach. His coaching career includes roles with Başkent Yıldızları, the Turkish national team, and junior departments of HC '05 Banská Bystrica and MHk 32 Liptovský Mikuláš in Slovakia. Most recently, he was a coach in the junior department of HC Davos in Switzerland.

As a player, Legerský competed in the Turkish Ice Hockey Super League (TBHSL) with Başkent Yıldızları and Izmir BB GSK. Standing 1.86 meters (6 feet 1 inch) tall and weighing 89 kilograms (196 pounds), he is a left winger who shoots right-handed.

== Playing career ==
Denis Legerský played in the under-18 (U18) team of Slovak club MHk 32 Liptovský Mikuláš between 2003 and 2005, and in the U20 team from 2005 to 2007 before he became member of the senior team in the Slovak Extraliga. After playing a short time for MHK Ružomberok in the Slovak 1.Liga, he transferred to HK Ružinov 99 Bratislava to play with both the U20 and senior teams. Between 2008 and 2010, Legerský was with HC Dukla Senica, and then in the 2010–11 season with his first club MHk 32 Liptovský Mikuláš in the Slovak 1.Liga.

In 2011, he moved to Turkey to play for the Ankara-based Başkent Yıldızları in the TBHSL. His team finished the 2012–13 season as league champion and he was named Top Scorer with, 75 points (42 goals, 33 assists), as well as the Most Valuable Player of the season.

Legerský participated as a player-coach at the IIHF Continental Cup 2013 - Group A matches in Miercurea Ciuc, Romania, and scored four goals in three games for Başkent Yıldızları. In the 2013–14 season, he transferred to İzmir Büyükşehir Belediyesi GSK, which finished the season as unbeaten champion of the league. He was named the Most Valuable Player of the season again.

Chronology

- 2003–2005 MHk 32 Liptovský Mikuláš U18
- 2004–2007 MHk 32 Liptovský Mikuláš U20
- 2006–2007 MHk 32 Liptovský Mikuláš (Extraliga)
- 2006–2007 MHK Ružomberok (1.liga)
- 2007–2008 HK Ružinov 99 Bratislava U20
- 2007–2008 HK Ružinov 99 Bratislava (1.liga)
- 2008–2010 HC Dukla Senica (1.liga)
- 2010–2011 MHk 32 Liptovský Mikuláš (1.liga)
- 2011–2013 Başkent Yıldızları (TBHSL)
- 2013–2014 Izmir BB GSK (TBHSL)
- 2014–2015 MHk 32 Liptovský Mikuláš (1.liga)
- 2015–2020 MHk 32 Liptovský Mikuláš B (2.SHL)

== International play ==
Medal record

Representing Slovakia

Men's ice hockey

Universiade
Bronze medal – third place	2009 Harbin	Ice hockey

Legerský was selected to the Slovak delegation at the 2009 Winter Universiade in Harbin, China and won a bronze medal with the Slovak national under-25 ice hockey team in the men's ice hockey tournament. Playing on the third line alongside Ján Babic and Michal Babic, he recorded one assist in six games played.

A scandal arose on 8 February 2014 when the Turkish Ice Hockey Federation allowed him to play in the friendly match against Bosnia and Herzegovina in the jersey of Ogün Uzunali, although he does not possess Turkish citizenship, and he was declared as an assistant coach only for the game. The President of the Turkish Federation stated that Legerský's participation in the game as player was in fully compliance with the Bosnian and Herzegovinian officials in exchange for their also non-citizen player-coach.

== Coaching career ==
Legerský was appointed player-coach of Başkent Yıldızları in the 2012–13 season, one year after he joined the team. For the 2014 IIHF World Championship Division II - Group B matches, he was admitted to the Turkey men's national ice hockey team as an assistant coach.

== Honors ==
=== Individual ===
- Most Valuable Player 2012–13 Turkish Ice Hockey Super League with Başkent Yıldızları
- Top Scorer 2012–13 Turkish Ice Hockey Super League with Başkent Yıldızları
- Most Valuable Player 2013–14 Turkish Ice Hockey Super League with İzmir Büyükşehir Belediyesi GSK

=== Club ===
- Champion 2012–13 Turkish Ice Hockey Super League (TBHSL) with Başkent Yıldızları
- Champion 2013–14 Turkish Ice Hockey Super League (TBHSL) with İzmir Büyükşehir Belediyesi GSK
