= Zakiev =

Zakiev is a surname. Notable people with the surname include:

- Ayrat Zakiev, Russian Paralympic powerlifter
- Mirfatyh Zakiev (1928–2023), scholar of Türkology
- Radik Zakiev (born 1986), Russian ice hockey forward
