= 2009 World University Games =

2009 World University Games may refer to:

- 2009 Summer Universiade, held in Belgrade, Serbia
- 2009 Winter Universiade, held in Harbin, China
