= Zyuzino =

Zyuzino may refer to several places:

- Zyuzino District, a district in South-Western Administrative Okrug of the federal city of Moscow, Russia
- Zyuzino, Russia, several rural localities in Russia
- Zyuzino (Moscow Metro)

== See also ==
- Zyuzin
