= Alexei Belov =

Russian ice hockey goalie

- Born: December 9, 1986 (age 38)
- Height: 5 ft 10 in (178 cm)
- Weight: 182 lb (83 kg; 13 st 0 lb)
- Position: Goaltender
- Rus-2 team Former teams: Kristall Saratov; HC Mechel; HC Lada Togliatti; HC CSK VVS Samara
- Playing career: 2004–present

Alexei Belov (born December 9, 1986) is a Russian ice hockey goalie who is currently playing for Kristall Saratov team in Russia.

== Career ==
Belov began his career with Lada-2 Togliatti and joined than in 2004 to Samara CSK VVS in the Vysshaya Liga on loan. He left than in September 2008 after six years HC Lada Togliatti and signed with Mechel Chelyabinsk of the Vysshaya Liga.

== International ==
Belov presented Russia at 2009 Universiads.

== Career statistics ==
			Regular season										Playoffs
Season	Team	League	GP	W	L	T	OT	MIN	GA	SO	GAA	SV%	GP	W	L	MIN	GA	SO	GAA	SV%
2004–05	HC CSK VVS Samara	Rus-2	7	—	—	—	—	—	—	—	1.25	—	—	—	—	—	—	—	—	—
2005–06	HC CSK VVS Samara	Rus-2	15	—	—	—	—	—	—	—	2.58	—	—	—	—	—	—	—	—	—
2005–06	HC Lada Togliatti	RSL	—	—	—	—	—	—	—	—	—	—	1	—	—	—	—	—	3.00	—
2006–07	HC CSK VVS Samara	Rus-2	33	—	—	—	—	—	—	—	2.46	—	3	3	—	—	—	—	—	—
2007–08	HC Lada Togliatti	RSL	9	—	—	—	—	—	20	—	3.48	—	—	—	—	—	—	—	—	—
2008–09	HC Mechel	Rus-2	11	—	—	—	—	—	—	—	2.72	—	—	—	—	—	—	—	—	—
2009–10	Kristall Saratov	Rus-2
