= Huo Cui =

Chinese ice hockey player

- Born: 13 September 1988 (age 38) Harbin, Heilongjiang, China
- Height: 161 cm (5 ft 3 in)
- Weight: 48 kg (106 lb; 7 st 8 lb)
- Position: Forward
- Shoots: Left
- Played for: KRS Vanke Rays; Team China (SM-sarja)
- National team: China
- Playing career: 2005–present
Medal record
Asian Winter Games
Bronze medal – third place	2011 Astana-Almaty	Ice hockey
Universiade
Silver medal – second place	2009 Harbin	Ice hockey
Challenge Cup of Asia
Gold medal – first place	2014 Harbin
Silver medal – second place	2012 Qiqihar

Huo Cui
- Traditional Chinese: 霍翠
- Simplified Chinese: 霍翠
Transcriptions
Standard Mandarin
- Hanyu Pinyin: Huò Cuì

Huo Cui (Chinese: 霍翠; pinyin: Huò Cuì; born 13 September 1988) is a Chinese ice hockey player and former member of the Chinese national team. She most recently played with the KRS Vanke Rays in the 2020–21 season of the Zhenskaya Hockey League (ZhHL). Huo represented China in the women's ice hockey tournament at the 2010 Winter Olympic Games and at a number of other international events.
