= Minttu Tuominen =

Finnish ice hockey player (born 1990)

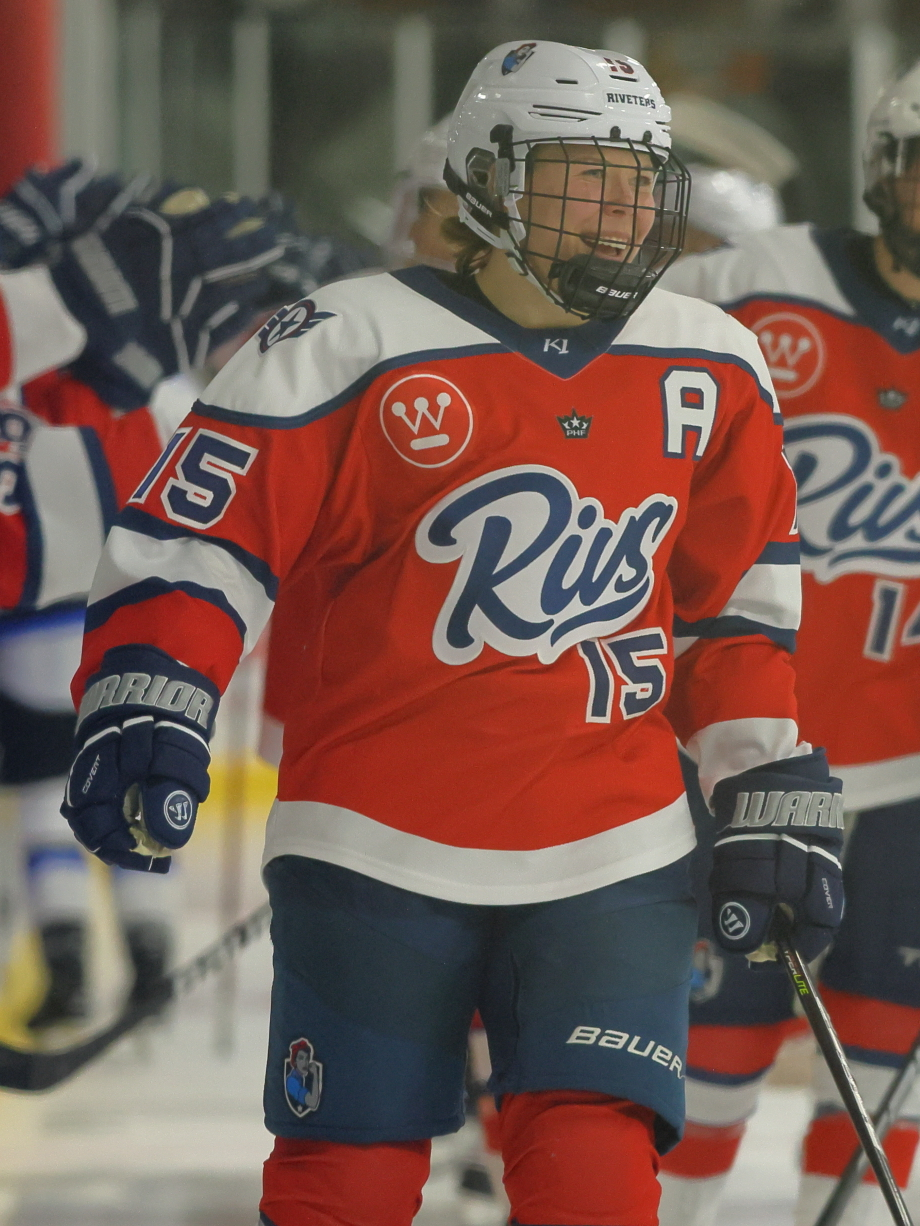
- Tuominen with the Metropolitan Riveters in 2022
- Born: 26 June 1990 (age 36) Helsinki, Finland
- Height: 1.65 m (5 ft 5 in)
- Weight: 71 kg (157 lb; 11 st 3 lb)
- Position: Defense
- Shot: Right
- Played for: Kiekko-Espoo; Shenzhen KRS; Metropolitan Riveters; KRS Vanke Rays; Ohio State Buckeyes; Linköping HC; Espoo Blues
- National team: Finland
- Playing career: 2006–2025
Medal record
Olympic Games
Bronze medal – third place	2010 Vancouver	Ice hockey
Bronze medal – third place	2018 Pyeongchang	Ice hockey
Bronze medal – third place	2022 Beijing	Ice hockey
World Championships
Silver medal – second place	2019 Finland
Bronze medal – third place	2011 Switzerland
Bronze medal – third place	2015 Sweden
Bronze medal – third place	2017 United States
Bronze medal – third place	2021 Canada
Universiade
Bronze medal – third place	2009 Harbin	Ice hockey

Minnamari "Minttu" Tuominen (Chinese: 托米宁; pinyin: Tuōmǐníng; born 26 June 1990) is a Finnish retired ice hockey player and the strength and conditioning coach of Kiekko-Espoo in the Auroraliiga (called Naisten Liiga until 2024). A member of the Finnish national ice hockey team from 2008 until 2022, she earned medals at three Winter Olympic Games and five IIHF Women's World Championships.

== Playing career ==
=== Finland ===
Tuominen played for the Espoo Blues Naiset in the Naisten SM-sarja (NSMs; rebranded as Naisten Liiga in 2017) and attended Mäkelänrinne Upper Secondary School in Helsinki. At Makelanrinne, she captained the ice hockey team after being named one of the school's top athletes of 2007 and 2008. As a member of the Espoo Blues, she won the Finnish Championship three times (2007, 2008, 2009). One of her teammates with the Espoo Blues was Emma Terho (née Laaksonen).

=== Ohio State Buckeyes ===
Milestones at Ohio State include:

- First goal: 3 October 2009, at Boston University
- First assist: 2 October 2009, at Boston University

=== PHF ===
Tuominen signed with the Metropolitan Riveters of the Premier Hockey Federation (PHF) for the 2022–23 season, during which she served as an alternate captain. She played on the first defensive pairing alongside Anna Kilponen and scored nine goals on the season, the second-most goals scored in a season by a defenseman in league history. As the backbone of the first power play unit she scored six power play goals, setting a league record.

She re-signed with the club for the 2023–24 season in May 2023. The PHF was bought out and dissolved in late June 2023 and her contract was terminated, prompting her return to Finland.

Tuominen was selected in the fourteenth round, 84th overall by PWHL Minnesota in the 2023 PWHL Draft. She was the second Finnish player to be drafted into the Professional Women's Hockey League (PWHL), following Susanna Tapani, who was also selected by Minnesota.

In August 2023, she signed with Kiekko-Espoo for the 2023–24 Naisten Liiga season, but her contract included the option to leave the team during the season. At the time, it was speculated that the provision was in place to allow Tuominen to play in the Professional Women's Hockey League (PWHL), a new North American league that replaced the PHF and began its first season in January 2024. Rather than joining the PWHL, Tuominen left Kiekko-Espoo mid-season for several months to join Shenzhen KRS for the inaugural season of the Chinese Women's Ice Hockey League (WCIHL). After winning the 2024 WCIHL championship with Shenzhen KRS, she returned to Kiekko-Espoo for the remainder of the Naisten Liiga regular season and playoffs.

== International play ==
As a junior player with the Finnish national under-18 team, Tuominen participated in the 2008 IIHF U18 Women's World Championship.

Tuominen made her debut with the Finnish national team in 2008, appearing in a series against Sweden in September, the 2008 Four Nations Cup in November, and helping Finland win the Euro Hockey Tour in December.

She was a member of the bronze medal-winning Finnish team at the 2009 Winter Universiade in Harbin, China and played at the 2009 MLP Nations Cup in Ravensburg, Germany. Tuominen won a bronze medal at the 2010 Four Nations Cup in St. John's, Newfoundland, Canada.

Her first major International Ice Hockey Federation (IIHF) tournament with the Finnish national team was the women's ice hockey tournament at the 2010 Winter Olympics in Vancouver, where she won her first Olympic bronze medal. At the 2011 IIHF Women's World Championship, she recorded her first point at a major IIHF tournament – the primary assist on Annina Rajahuhta's goal against Kazakhstan in the preliminary round – and her first major tournament goal, scoring twice against Russia in the bronze medal game, which Finland ultimately won in overtime.

Having established herself as a core player on the national team, Tuominen went on to play at the subsequent seven IIHF Women's World Championships, winning a silver medal in 2019 and bronze medals in 2015, 2017, and 2021. She was selected as a top-three player for Finland by the coaches at the 2015 tournament.

== Career statistics ==
=== Regular season and playoffs ===
			Regular season					Playoffs
Season	Team	League	GP	G	A	Pts	PIM	GP	G	A	Pts	PIM
2003–04	KS Noux	N. Suomi-sarja	5	1	0	1	2	–	–	–	–	—
2004–05	KS Noux	Naisten I-div.	8	3	1	4	2	–	–	–	–	—
2005–06	KS Noux	Naisten I-div.	11	4	6	10	6	–	–	–	–	—
2006–07	Espoo Blues	NSMs	17	5	2	7	0	7	0	1	1	4
2007–08	Espoo Blues	NSMs	11	4	3	7	0	9	0	4	4	0
2008–09	Espoo Blues	NSMs	22	14	21	35	6	6	2	3	5	4
2009–10	Ohio State Buckeyes	NCAA	23	6	5	11	8	–	–	–	–	—
2010–11	Ohio State Buckeyes	NCAA	32	2	8	10	10	–	–	–	–	—
2011–12	Ohio State Buckeyes	NCAA	32	2	7	9	22	–	–	–	–	—
2012–13	Ohio State Buckeyes	NCAA	37	6	13	19	22	–	–	–	–	—
2013–14	Espoo Blues	NSMs	24	11	20	31	24	8	5	9	14	6
2014–15	Espoo Blues	NSMs	26	17	32	49	40	3	2	4	6	4
2015–16	Espoo Blues	NSMs	28	13	45	58	16	6	4	3	7	8
2016–17	Linköping HC	SDHL	32	17	9	26	20	5	1	0	1	4
2017–18	Espoo Blues	NSML	20	12	11	23	10	10	2	5	7	12
2018–19	Espoo Blues	NSML	30	13	50	63	18	6	3	4	7	6
2019–20	Kiekko-Espoo	NSML	30	19	21	40	14	6	3	13	16	4
2020–21	KRS Vanke Rays	ZhHL	24	5	13	18	14	5	0	0	0	4
2021–22	Kiekko-Espoo	NSML	15	3	13	16	2	–	–	–	–	—
2021–22	KRS Vanke Rays	ZhHL	12	2	4	6	10	8	0	6	6	12
2022–23	Metropolitan Riveters	PHF	24	9	5	14	10	–	–	–	–	—
2023–24	Shenzhen KRS	WCIHL
2023–24	Kiekko-Espoo	NSML	18	5	26	31	4	9	2	8	10	6
NCAA totals			124	16	33	49	62	–	–	–	–	–
Naisten Liiga totals			223	111	218	329	130	61	21	46	67	48
ZhHL totals			36	7	17	24	24	13	0	6	6	16

=== International ===
Year	Team	Event	Result	GP	G	A	Pts	PIM
2008	Finland	WC18	6th	5	0	2	2	4
2009	Finland	Uni	3rd place, bronze medalist(s)	7	2	6	8	2
2010	Finland	OG	3rd place, bronze medalist(s)	5	0	0	0	0
2011	Finland	WC	3rd place, bronze medalist(s)	6	2	2	4	10
2012	Finland	WC	4th	6	0	0	0	4
2013	Finland	WC	4th	6	0	0	0	2
2014	Finland	OG	5th	6	0	1	1	6
2015	Finland	WC	3rd place, bronze medalist(s)	6	1	2	3	2
2016	Finland	WC	4th	6	0	1	1	6
2017	Finland	WC	3rd place, bronze medalist(s)	6	0	3	3	2
2018	Finland	OG	3rd place, bronze medalist(s)	6	1	2	3	2
2019	Finland	WC	2nd place, silver medalist(s)	7	1	1	2	4
2021	Finland	WC	3rd place, bronze medalist(s)	7	1	0	1	6
2022	Finland	OG	3rd place, bronze medalist(s)	7	2	1	3	2
Senior totals				74	8	13	21	46

== See also ==
- List of Olympic women's ice hockey players for Finland
- List of Finnish women in North American collegiate ice hockey
