= Yoo Sung-je =

South Korean ice hockey player

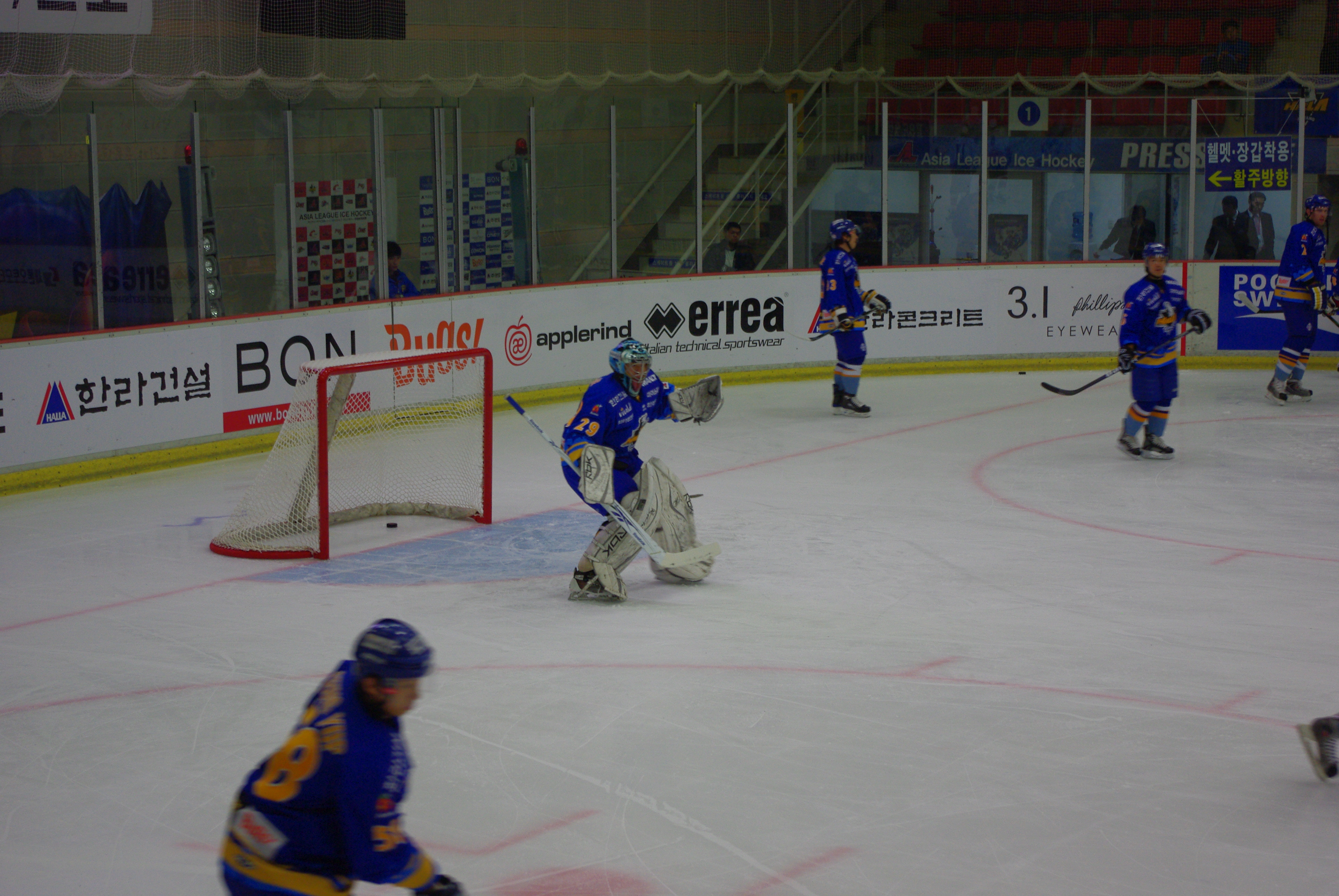
- Yoo Sung-je during warm-up
- Born: 16 July 1985 (age 40) Seoul, KOR
- Height: 1.87 m (6 ft 2 in)
- Weight: 76 kg (168 lb; 12 st 0 lb)
- Position: Goaltender
- Catches: Left
- ALH team: Anyang Halla
- Playing career: 2009–present

- Yoo Sung-je
- Hangul: 유성제
- RR: Yu Seongje
- MR: Yu Sŏngje

Yoo Sung-je (Korean: 유성제; born 16 July 1985 in Seoul) is a Korean ice hockey goaltender. He played for Anyang Halla from 2009 through 2012.
