= Mark Mahon (ice hockey) =

Canadian-German former ice hockey player (born 1965)

Mark Mahon (born November 11, 1965, in Vankleek Hill, Ontario) is a Canadian-German former ice hockey player, who has been serving as a coach and Director of Sport since the end of his playing career. Mahon was most recently the Director of Sport at Kölner Haie in Germany's top-tier Deutsche Eishockey Liga.

== Playing career ==
Mahon attended the Université Concordia in Montreal from 1986 to 1989 and was named Hockey All-Canadian in 1989. He was presented with the Dr. Robert J. Brodrick Award as Concordia’s Athlete of the Year the same year.

Mahon spent most of his professional career in Germany, playing for Dinslakener EC, EC Braunlage, the Wedemark Scorpions and the Hamburg Crocodiles. During the 1990-91 season, he had a short stint with English side Solihull Barons. While mostly competing in lower-league teams in Germany, he saw action in 50 games of the German elite-league Deutsche Eishockey Liga, when playing with the Wedemark Scorpions in 1996-97.

== Coaching and managing career ==
Mahon started his coaching career as an assistant at the University of Toronto in April 2001, before being named head coach of the Nikko Ice Bucks in August 2002. He stayed with the Ice Bucks until February 2004. Mahon was appointed as head coach of Japan’s Men’s National Team in March 2004 and held the position until May 2015. He also served as the head coach of Japan’s Junior National Team.

Between August 2015 and Januar 2016, Mahon worked as an assistant to head coach Uwe Krupp at Eisbären Berlin in Germany.

On January 30, 2016, he was appointed Director of Sport at Kölner Haie. He stayed on the job until February 2020.
