= Vanessa Davidson =

Canadian ice hockey player (born 1984)

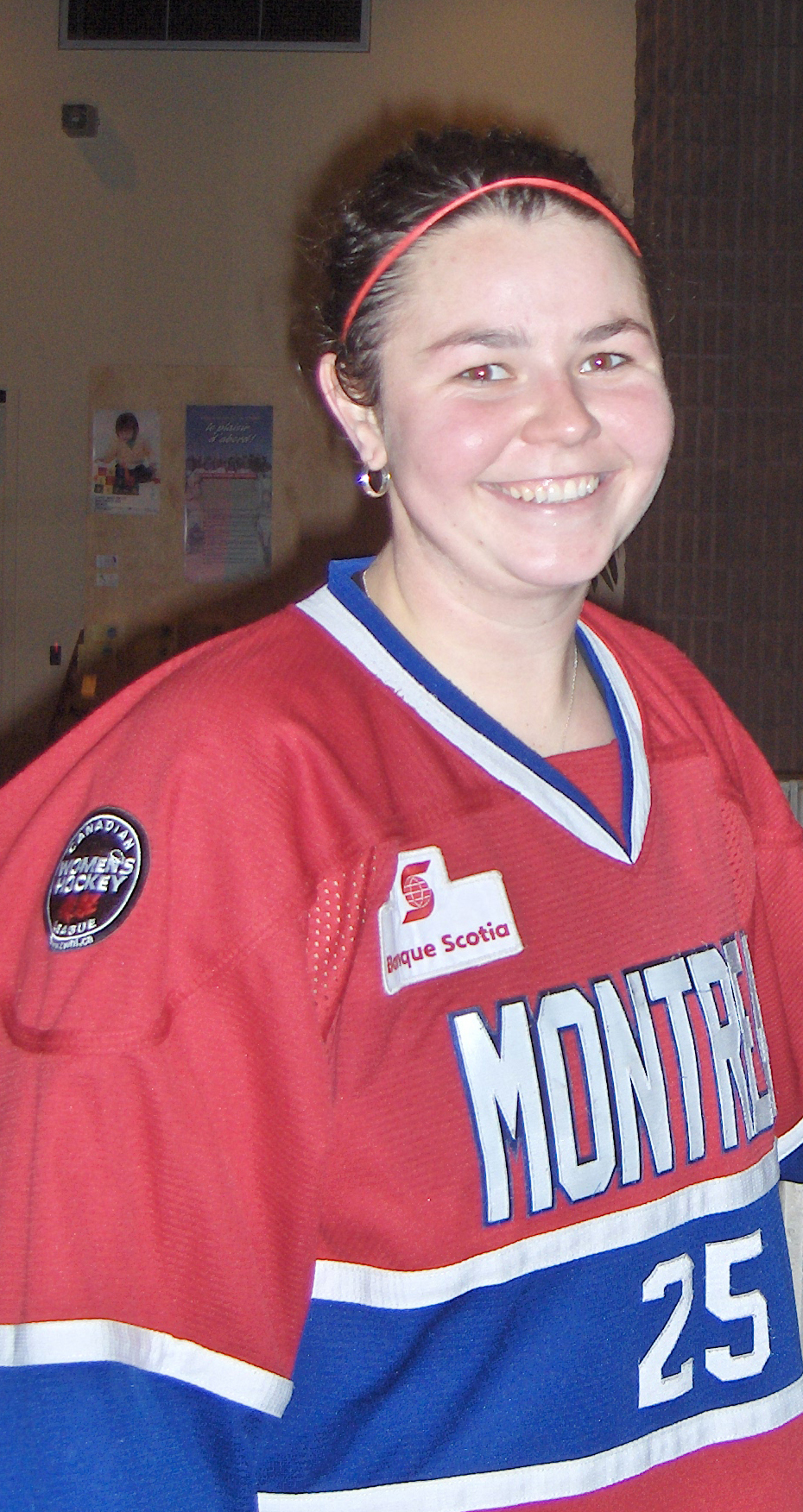
- Davidson in 2011
- Born: August 15, 1984 (age 42) Kirkland, Quebec, Canada
- Height: 5 ft 8 in (173 cm)
- Weight: 143 lb (65 kg; 10 st 3 lb)
- Position: Centre
- Shot: Left
- Played for: Montreal Stars
- Playing career: 2010–2014

Vanessa Davidson is a Canadian former ice hockey centre. She went to university at McGill University, playing hockey there for five years, and afterwards played four seasons for the Montreal Stars in the CWHL, before retiring in 2014. She was inducted into the McGill Athletics Hall of Fame in 2020.

== Early life ==
Davidson was born on August 15, 1984, in Kirkland, Quebec. She attended Seignory Elementary School, and later attended John Rennie High School.

== Career ==
After leaving high school, Davidson briefly played for the Quebec Avalanche in the now defunct NWHL, played for five years at McGill University, whilst also studying physical education. She had a successful tenure there, twice receiving the teams MVP award. She is the all-time leader in games played, goals, assists and points for the side. In her final year, she was named team captain.

After leaving McGill, Davidson went to play for the Montreal Stars, and won the Clarkson Cup in her first two years there, scoring in both. Shortly after earning her 100th career CWHL point on 8 February 2014, Davidson retired from professional hockey.

After concluding her hockey career, Davidson became a PE teacher at Pierre Elliot Trudeau Elementary School in Vaudreuil-Dorion, Quebec.

== Sexual assault charges ==
On November 8, 2024, Davidson was charged with one count of sexual assault, and two counts of sexual exploitation, all against one individual who was a minor at the time, from October 1, 2012, to March 31, 2013.

== Career statistics ==
Season	Team	League	GP	G	A	Pts	PIM
2004-05	Quebec Avalanche	NWHL	32	8	3	11	44
2010-11	Montreal Stars	CWHL	27	12	8	20	24
2011-12	Montreal Stars	CWHL	27	24	25	49	26
2012-13	Montreal Stars	CWHL	14	5	6	11	6
2013-14	Montreal Stars	CWHL	23	11	20	31	20

== Awards ==
- CIS All Canadian (2007, 2008, 2009)
- QSSF All-Star Team (2006, 2007, 2008, 2009)
- McGill University Women's Ice Hockey Team MVP (Twice, years unknown)
- Clarkson Cup Champion (2011, 2012)
- McGill Athletics Hall of Fame (2020)
