= Ma Jinping =

Chinese ice hockey player and official (born 1972)

- Born: 1 January 1972 (age 54)
- Height: 162 cm (5 ft 4 in)
- Weight: 62 kg (137 lb; 9 st 11 lb)
- Position: Forward
- Shot: Right
- Played for: Harbin Ice Hockey
- National team: China
- Playing career: c. 1995–2005
Medal record
Asian Winter Games
Gold medal – first place	1996 Harbin	Ice hockey

Ma Jinping
- Traditional Chinese: 馬金萍
- Simplified Chinese: 马金萍
Transcriptions
Standard Mandarin
- Hanyu Pinyin: Mǎ Jīnpíng

Ma Jinping (Chinese: 马金萍; born 1 January 1972) is a Chinese retired ice hockey player and on-ice official. Best known having represented China in the inaugural women's ice hockey tournament at the 1998 Winter Olympics in Nagano, she also played for the Chinese national team at the IIHF Women's World Championships in 1997, 2004, and 2005, and won a gold medal in the women's ice hockey tournament at the 1996 Asian Winter Games in Harbin.

== Officiating career ==
Since her retirement from the Chinese national team, Ma has served in the capacity of linesperson at various events sanctioned by the International Ice Hockey Federation (IIHF), including games in the 2012 IIHF U18 Women's World Championship Division I, the Olympic pre-qualification tournament for the 2014 Winter Olympics, and the women's ice hockey tournament at the National Winter Games of China in 2016.

== Career statistics ==
Note: GP = Games played; G = Goals; A = Assists; Pts = Points; PIM = Penalty minutes;

				Regular season
Year	Team	Event	Result	GP	G	A	Pts	PIM
1997	China	WC	4th	5	0	0	0	0
1998	China	OG	4th	6	0	0	0	6
2004	China	WC	7th	4	1	0	1	2
2005	China	WC	6th	5	0	0	0	0
2006	China	OGQ	DNQ	3	0	1	1	0
