= Chad Klassen =

Canadian ice hockey player

- Born: April 16, 1985 (age 39); Warman, Saskatchewan, Canada
- Height: 5 ft 11 in (180 cm)
- Weight: 174 lb (79 kg; 12 st 6 lb)
- Position: Centre
- Shoots: Right
- Austria team Former teams: Alba Volán Székesfehérvár; ECHL; Victoria Salmon Kings; Idaho Steelheads
- NHL draft: Undrafted
- Playing career: 2011–present

Chad Klassen (born April 16, 1985) is a Canadian ice hockey player. He is currently playing with Alba Volán Székesfehérvár in the Austrian Hockey League.

== Amateur career ==
Klassen played five seasons of major junior hockey (2001 – 2006) in the Western Hockey League (WHL). He went on to play five seasons of Canadian college hockey (2006 – 2011) with the University of Alberta in the CWUAA conference of Canadian Interuniversity Sport (CIS). For his outstanding college hockey play he was twice named to the CIS All-Canadian First Team (2008–09 and 2009–10) and was named the CIS (West) Most Valuable Player for the 2009–10 season.

== Awards and honours ==
| Award | Year |
|---|---|
| Western Hockey League West Second All-Star Team | 2003-04 |
| Western Hockey League West Second All-Star Team | 2004-05 |
| CIS First-Team All-Canadian | 2008–09 |
| CIS (West) Most Valuable Player | 2009–10 |
| CIS First-Team All-Canadian | 2009–10 |
| CIS All-Canadian Second Team | 2010–11 |
