= Tomomi Iwahara =

Japanese ice hockey player (born 1987)

- Born: December 19, 1987 (age 37)
- Height: 1.61 m (5 ft 3 in)
- Weight: 61 kg (134 lb; 9 st 8 lb)
- Position: Forward
- Shoots: Left
- J-League team: Seibu Princess Rabbits
- National team: Japan

Tomomi Iwahara (岩原 知美, Iwahara Tomomi, born December 19, 1987) is a Japanese ice hockey player for Seibu Princess Rabbits and the Japanese national team. She participated at the 2015 IIHF Women's World Championship.

Iwahara competed at the 2018 Winter Olympics.
