= Zyuzino, Astrakhan Oblast =

Zyuzino Зюзино
- Selo
- Location within Astrakhan Oblast Location within Russia
- Coordinates: 45°45′N 47°39′E
- Country: Russia
- Region: Astrakhan Oblast
- District: Ikryaninsky District
- Time zone: UTC+4:00

Zyuzino (Russian: Зюзино) is a rural locality (a selo) in Ikryaninsky District, Astrakhan Oblast, Russia. The population was 540 as of 2010. There are 12 streets.

== Geography ==
Zyuzino is located 48 km south of Ikryanoye (the district's administrative centre) by road. Mumra is the nearest rural locality.
