= Zyuzino, Russia =

Name of several Russian rural localities

Zyuzino (Russian: Зюзино) is the name of several rural localities in Russia:

- Zyuzino, Astrakhan Oblast, a selo in Zyuzinsky Selsoviet of Ikryaninsky District of Astrakhan Oblast
- Zyuzino, Kaluga Oblast, a village in Mosalsky District of Kaluga Oblast
- Zyuzino, Kurgan Oblast, a selo in Zyuzinsky Selsoviet of Belozersky District of Kurgan Oblast
- Zyuzino, Moscow Oblast, a selo in Vyalkovskoye Rural Settlement of Ramensky District of Moscow Oblast
- Zyuzino, Republic of Tatarstan, a selo in Rybno-Slobodsky District of the Republic of Tatarstan
- Zyuzino, Udmurt Republic, a selo in Zyuzinsky Selsoviet of Sharkansky District of the Udmurt Republic
