= Vladimír Žemba =

Slovak ice hockey player

- Born: November 10, 1988 (age 36)
- Position: Forward
- Slovak Extraliga team: HK SKP Poprad
- Playing career: 2006–2011

Vladimír Žemba (born November 10, 1988) is a Slovak professional ice hockey player who played with HK SKP Poprad in the Slovak Extraliga during the 2010–11 season.
