= Steve Fone =

- Born: 1 July 1987 (age 39) Rotherham, England
- Height: 6 ft 0 in (183 cm)
- Weight: 180 lb (82 kg; 12 st 12 lb)
- Position: Goaltender
- Catches: Left
- EPL team Former teams: Manchester Phoenix; Coventry Blaze
- Playing career: 2001–present

Stephen Fone (born 1 July 1987 in Rotherham, England) is an English ice hockey goaltender. He is currently taking time out from ice hockey.

== Career ==
Fone began his career in Sheffield, only a short distance from his Rotherham home. Initially playing at the Under-16 level for the Sheffield Rapiers, he featured in 13 games in his first season, managing a respectable goals against average of 3.87 and save percentage of .888% Fone would remain with the Rapiers the season after, dramatically improving his game to a GAA of 1.37 and a save percentage of .922% It was this season that he also made his debut for the U-19 team of the Sheffield organisation, the Sheffield Steelhawks. It was his only appearance that season.

Fone remained within the Sheffield organisation until the end of the 2004/05 season, featuring for the Steelhawks, the Sheffield Scimitars and also joining up with the senior Sheffield Steelers for a period, although Fone failed to make a league appearance for the Steelers.

Fone moved for the 2005/06 season and split the season between four appearances again for the Scimitars, but it was at the Solihull Barons that he established himself as first choice goaltender. He played at EPL level on 46 occasions for his new team.

It was in the 2006/07 season that Fone again moved up a level, signing for the Coventry Blaze, a move prompted by his attendance at University in the Midlands. Fone is mainly used as a back-up goaltender by the Blaze, but has played on six occasions in the 2007/08 season, proving himself to be a solid stand-in. In 2007, Fone also made his debut for his country, playing at the World Junior Championships for Team GB.

Fone made a loan move to the Blaze's EIHL rivals the Manchester Phoenix in January 2008 due to an injury to the Phoenix's first choice goaltender, Scott Fankhouser. Fone started well for the Phoenix, winning the Man of the Match award for his heroics in a 5–2 victory against the Cardiff Devils. Fone started two more games for the Phoenix before returning to again play for the Blaze.

Fone received a boost in April 2008 after he was chosen as the third choice goaltender and travelling reserve for the Team G.B. squad playing at the World Championships in Austria. After concluding the 2008/09 season as a Coventry Blaze player, he would agree to re-sign for the Manchester Phoenix following their decision to play in the EPL.

The 2012/13 season saw Steve win the Play-offs with Manchester Phoenix following a serious injury earlier in the season.
