= Saija Tarkki =

Finnish ice hockey player and executive (born 1982)

- Born: 29 December 1982 (age 43) Oulu, Finland
- Height: 172 cm (5 ft 8 in)
- Weight: 60 kg (132 lb; 9 st 6 lb)
- Position: Defence
- Shot: Left
- Played for: Oulun Kärpät; MODO Hockey
- Coached for: Oulun Kärpät
- National team: Finland
- Playing career: 1998–2019
- Coaching career: 2023–present
Medal record
Olympic Games
Bronze medal – third place	2010 Vancouver	Ice hockey
World Championship
Bronze medal – third place	2009 Finland
Bronze medal – third place	2008 China
Bronze medal – third place	2004 Canada
Universiade
Bronze medal – third place	2009 Harbin	Ice hockey

Saija Katariina Tarkki née Sirviö (born 29 December 1982) is a Finnish retired ice hockey player and the former general manager of Oulun Kärpät Naiset in the Naisten Liiga (NSML). The Oulun Kärpät director of youth ice hockey since 2022, she briefly served as interim head coach of Kärpät Naiset in October 2023.

Tarkki represented Finland at four Winter Olympics and eight IIHF Women's World Championships, winning bronze in the women's ice hockey tournament at the 2010 Winter Olympics in Vancouver and at the World Championship tournaments in 2004, 2008, and 2009.

== Personal life ==
Tarkki is married to former Liiga goaltender Tuomas Tarkki.

== Career statistics ==
Event	Goals	Assists	Points	Shots	PIM	+/-
2010 Winter Olympics	1	0	1	2	7	2
