= Aaron Sorochan =

Canadian ice hockey player

- Born: April 17, 1984 (age 42) Edmonton, Alberta, Canada
- Height: 6 ft 0 in (183 cm)
- Weight: 165 lb (75 kg; 11 st 11 lb)
- Position: Goaltender
- Catches: Right
- Played for: AHL; Springfield Falcons; ECHL; Stockton Thunder
- NHL draft: Undrafted
- Playing career: 2009–present

Aaron Sorochan (born April 17, 1984) is a retired Canadian professional ice hockey goaltender who played for the Springfield Falcons of the American Hockey league (AHL). He was awarded the Clare Drake Award and named the CIS Rookie of the Year for his outstanding play during the 2005–06 season.

Prior to turning professional, Sorochan played five seasons of major junior hockey in the Western Hockey League before he attended the University of Alberta, where he played four seasons with the Alberta Golden Bears men's ice hockey team. Sorochan was in the net as he led the Golden Bears to win the CIS national championship in 2008.

In December 2007, while still a member of the Alberta Golden Bears, Sorochan was signed by the Edmonton Oilers to a National Hockey League amateur try-out agreement, and was dressed, but did not play, as the Oilers' backup goaltender for the December 21, 2007 game against the New Jersey Devils when the Oilers' starter Dwayne Roloson was sidelined with influenza.

Sorochan made his professional debut on October 18, 2009, playing in net for the Springfield Falcons in a 6–1 loss to the Manchester Monarchs of the AHL.

== Awards and honours ==
Award	Year
WHL
East First All-Star Team	2005
College
CIS Rookie of the Year (Clare Drake Award)	2005–06
