= Lukáš Škrečko =

Slovak ice hockey player

- Born: July 17, 1987 (age 38) Banská Bystrica, Czechoslovakia
- Height: 6 ft 4 in (193 cm)
- Weight: 212 lb (96 kg; 15 st 2 lb)
- Position: Goaltender
- Caught: Left
- Played for: HKM Zvolen; HK Dukla Trenčín
- National team: Slovakia
- NHL draft: Undrafted
- Playing career: 2007–2014

Lukáš Škrečko (born July 17, 1987) is a Slovak former professional ice hockey goaltender. He played in the Tipsport Liga for HKM Zvolen and HK Dukla Trenčín.
