= Andrei Kolesnikov (ice hockey) =

Russian ice hockey player

- Born: February 26, 1989 (age 36); Barnaul, Russian SFSR, USSR
- Height: 5 ft 10 in (178 cm)
- Weight: 198 lb (90 kg; 14 st 2 lb)
- Position: Defence
- Shot: Left
- Played for: Rubin Tyumen; Saryarka Karagandy; Vityaz Chekhov; Neftekhimik Nizhnekamsk; Chelmet Chelyabinsk
- Playing career: 2006–2015

Medal record

Ice hockey

Representing Russia

World Junior A Challenge
Bronze medal – third place	2006 Yorkton	

Andrei Kolesnikov (born February 26, 1989) is a Russian professional ice hockey defenceman who currently plays for Chelmet Chelyabinsk of the Higher Hockey League.

== Career statistics ==
			Regular season					Playoffs
Season	Team	League	GP	G	A	Pts	PIM	GP	G	A	Pts	PIM
2005–06	HC CSKA Moscow-2	Russia3	42	0	3	3	20	—	—	—	—	—
2005–06	SDYUSHOR CSKA Moskva	MosJHL	4	0	1	1	6	—	—	—	—	—
2006–07	HC CSKA Moscow-2	Russia3	23	0	5	5	28	—	—	—	—	—
2006–07	Neftyanik Leninogorsk	Russia2	25	1	3	4	10	—	—	—	—	—
2007–08	Neftyanik Leninogorsk	Russia2	47	5	8	13	52	4	1	0	1	10
2008–09	Vityaz Chekhov	KHL	46	4	10	14	36	—	—	—	—	—
2008–09	Vityaz Chekhov-2	Russia3	3	1	4	5	0	14	7	6	13	12
2009–10	Vityaz Chekhov	KHL	44	3	10	13	28	—	—	—	—	—
2009–10	Russkie Vityazi Chekhov	MHL	16	4	12	16	12	3	1	0	1	32
2010–11	Vityaz Chekhov	KHL	45	1	10	11	18	—	—	—	—	—
2010–11	Russkie Vityazi Chekhov	MHL	10	5	4	9	16	—	—	—	—	—
2011–12	Vityaz Chekhov	KHL	12	0	1	1	4	—	—	—	—	—
2011–12	HC Neftekhimik Nizhnekamsk	KHL	9	0	0	0	2	—	—	—	—	—
2012–13	Saryarka Karagandy	VHL	43	2	9	11	26	17	0	7	7	2
2013–14	Rubin Tyumen	VHL	21	2	4	6	0	3	0	1	1	0
2014–15	Chelmet Chelyabinsk	VHL	41	1	9	10	22	6	0	2	2	2
KHL totals			156	8	31	39	88	—	—	—	—	—
VHL totals			105	5	22	27	48	26	0	10	10	4
Russia2 totals			72	6	11	17	62	4	1	0	1	10
