= Petra Jurčová =

Slovak ice hockey player

- Born: 22 June 1987 (age 39) Košice, Czechoslovakia
- Height: 170 cm (5 ft 7 in)
- Weight: 66 kg (146 lb; 10 st 6 lb)
- Position: Wing
- Shoots: Left
- Played for: ŽHK Šarišanka Prešov; HK Spišská Nová Ves; HC Slovan Bratislava; ŽHK Poprad; HC Slavia Praha
- National team: Slovakia
- Playing career: 2005–present
Medal record
Universiade
Bronze medal – third place	2011 Erzurum	Ice hockey

Petra Jurčová (born 22 June 1987) is a Slovak ice hockey forward and former member of the Slovak national ice hockey team. She represented Slovakia in the women's ice hockey tournament at the 2006 Winter Olympics, at seven IIHF Women's World Championship tournaments at the Top Division through Division II levels, and in the women's ice hockey tournaments at the Winter Universiades in 2009 and 2011.

Jurčová most recently played with ŽHK 2000 Šarišanka Prešov in the 2020–21 season of the Slovak Women's Extraliga.

== International career ==
Jurčová was selected for the women's ice hockey team of the Slovak Olympic delegation at the 2010 Winter Olympics. She played in all five games, recording one assist. She played in the qualifying campaigns for the 2010 and 2014 Olympics.

Jurčová has also appeared for Slovakia at seven IIHF Women's World Championships, across three levels. Her first appearance came in 2005. She appeared at the Top Level championships in 2011 and 2012.

== Personal life ==
Jurčová's younger brother, Tomáš Jurčo, is also an ice hockey player; he has played with several teams in the National Hockey League (NHL) and represented Slovakia in the men's ice hockey tournament at the 2014 Winter Olympics.

== Career statistics ==
=== International ===
Year	Team	Event	Result	GP	G	A	Pts	PIM
2005	Slovakia	WW D2	3rd	5	2	2	4	4
2007	Slovakia	WW D2	1st	5	5	2	7	2
2008	Slovakia	WW D1	2nd	5	0	0	0	0
2008	Slovakia	OGQ	Q	3	0	0	0	0
2009	Slovakia	Uni	4th	7	5	1	6	6
2009	Slovakia	WW D1	1st	5	7	1	8	8
2010	Slovakia	OG	8th	5	0	1	1	0
2011	Slovakia	WW	7th	5	0	0	0	0
2011	Slovakia	Uni	3rd place, bronze medalist(s)	7	4	4	8	2
2012	Slovakia	WW	8th	5	0	0	0	4
2013	Slovakia	OGQ	DNQ	2	0	0	0	0
2014	Slovakia	WW D1A	6th	5	2	1	3	0
				59	25	12	37	26
