= Michal Nedvídek =

Czech ice hockey player

- Born: May 13, 1987 (age 37)
- Height: 6 ft 0 in (183 cm)
- Weight: 170 lb (77 kg; 12 st 2 lb)
- Position: Goaltender
- Catches: Right
- Czech Extraliga team: HC Bílí Tygři Liberec
- Playing career: 2006–present

Michal Nedvídek (born May 13, 1987) is a Czech professional ice hockey goaltender. He played with HC Bílí Tygři Liberec in the Czech Extraliga during the 2006–07 Czech Extraliga season.
