= Sergei Zuborev =

Russian ice hockey player

- Born: April 7, 1983 (age 42) Moscow, Russian SFSR, Soviet Union
- Height: 6 ft 0 in (183 cm)
- Weight: 194 lb (88 kg; 13 st 12 lb)
- Position: Defence
- Shoots: Left
- KHL team: Vityaz Chekhov
- NHL draft: Undrafted
- Playing career: 2002–present

Sergei Zuborev (born April 7, 1983) is a Russian professional ice hockey player who plays for Vityaz Chekhov of the Kontinental Hockey League (KHL).
