= Dmitri Malgin =

Kazakhstani ice hockey player

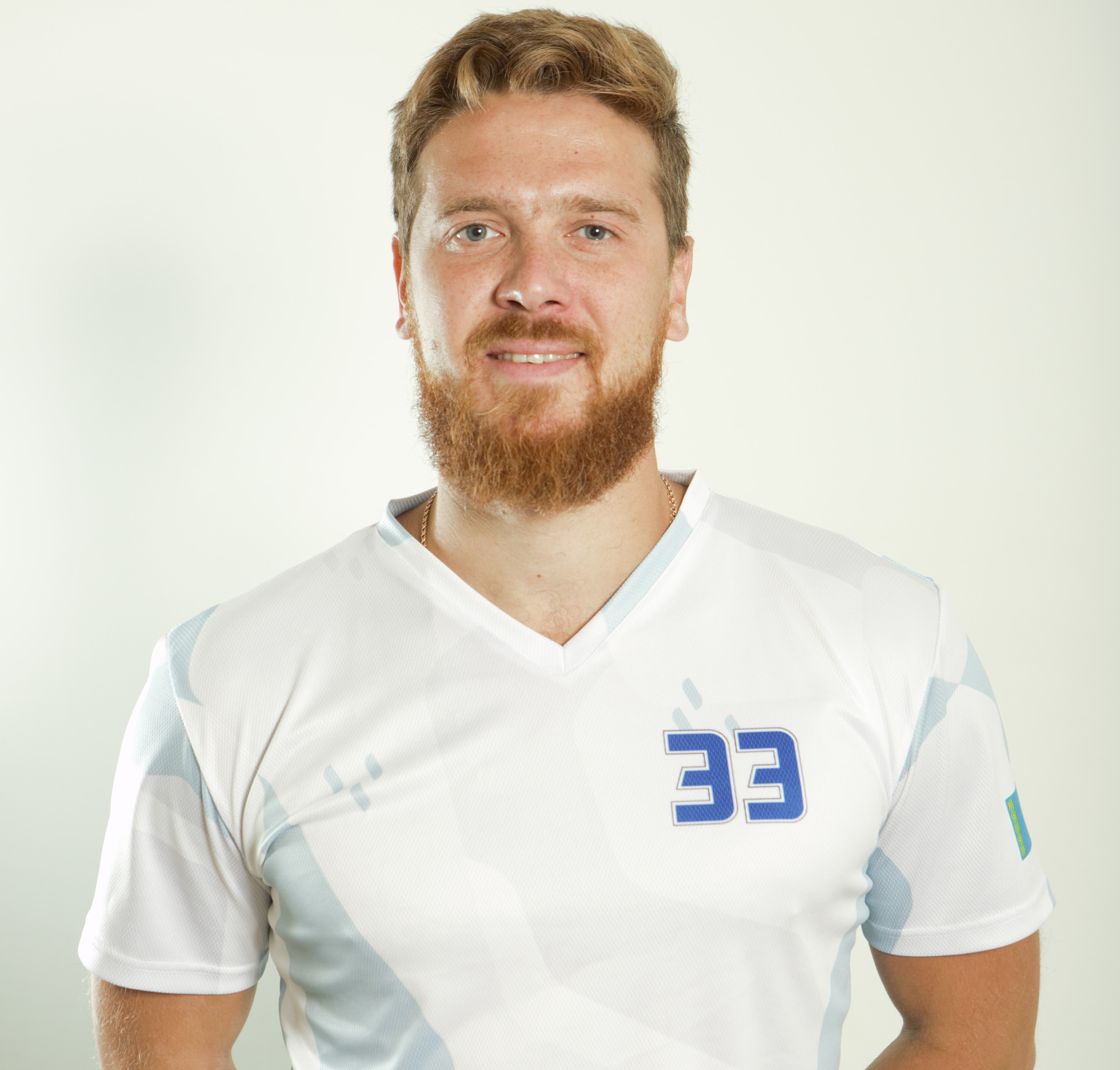
- Born: July 28, 1987 (age 39) Ust-Kamenogorsk, Kazakh SSR, Soviet Union
- Height: 6 ft 1 in (185 cm)
- Weight: 183 lb (83 kg; 13 st 1 lb)
- Position: Goaltender
- Shot: Left
- Played for: Barys Astana
- National team: Kazakhstan
- Playing career: 2005–2023

Dmitri Igorevich Malgin (Russian: Дмитрий Игоревич Мальгин; born July 28, 1987) is a Kazakhstani former professional ice hockey goaltender. He has formerly played with top tiered club, Barys Astana of the Kontinental Hockey League (KHL).
