= Dmitri Zyuzin =

Russian ice hockey player

- Born: October 21, 1987 (age 38) Ufa, Russia
- Height: 6 ft 0 in (183 cm)
- Weight: 194 lb (88 kg; 13 st 12 lb)
- Position: Centre)
- Shoots: Left
- KHL team: Metallurg Novokuznetsk
- NHL draft: Undrafted
- Playing career: 2005–present

Dmitri Zyuzin (born October 21, 1987) is a professional ice hockey player who currently plays the 2010–11 season in the Kontinental Hockey League with Metallurg Novokuznetsk.
