= Ma Rui =

Chinese ice hockey player

Personal information
- Nationality: Chinese
- Born: 29 March 1989 (age 35); Harbin, Heilongjiang, China

Sport
- Sport: Ice hockey

Ma Rui (simplified Chinese: 马蕊; traditional Chinese: 馬蕊; pinyin: Mǎ Ruǐ; born 29 March 1989) is a Chinese ice hockey player. She is a member of the China women's national ice hockey team. She competed for China at the 2010 Winter Olympics. The team finished 7th out of 8 teams.
