= Jia Dandan =

Chinese ice hockey player

- Born: 5 May 1982 (age 44) Harbin, Heilongjiang, China
- Height: 162 cm (5 ft 4 in)
- Weight: 55 kg (121 lb; 8 st 9 lb)
- Position: Goaltender
- Caught: Right
- Played for: Team China (NSMs); Harbin Ice Hockey
- Coached for: China; China U18
- National team: China
- Coaching career: c. 2018–present
Medal record
Asian Winter Games
Bronze medal – third place	2003 Aomori

Jia Dandan
- Traditional Chinese: 賈丹丹
- Simplified Chinese: 贾丹丹
Transcriptions
Standard Mandarin
- Hanyu Pinyin: Jiǎ Dāndān

Jia Dandan (Chinese: 贾丹丹; born 5 May 1982) is a Chinese ice hockey coach and retired goaltender. She represented China in the women's ice hockey tournament at the 2010 Winter Olympics.

== Career statistics ==
Year	Team	Event	Result	GP	W	L	T/OT	MIN	GA	SO	GAA	SV%
2010	China	OG	7th	1	0	0	0	52:07	4	1	4.61	0.907
