= Radik Zakiev =

Russian ice hockey player

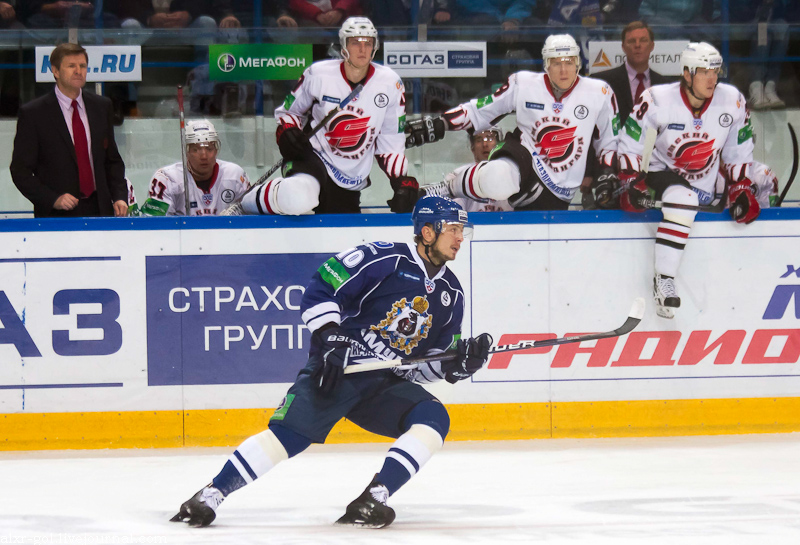
- Radik Zakiev in the KHL match Amur - Avangard on October 18, 2011
- Born: 23 December 1986 (age 38); Nizhnekamsk, Russian SFSR
- Height: 6 ft 2 in (188 cm)
- Weight: 207 lb (94 kg; 14 st 11 lb)
- Position: Forward
- Shot: Left
- Played for: Neftekhimik Nizhnekamsk; Amur Khabarovsk; Torpedo Nizhny Novgorod; Traktor Chelyabinsk
- Playing career: 2004–2015

Radik Zakiev (born 23 December 1986) is a Russian former professional ice hockey forward who played in the Kontinental Hockey League. He most notably led Amur Khabarovsk in scoring with 12 goals and 25 points in 54 games during the 2010–11 season.

== Career statistics ==
			Regular season					Playoffs
Season	Team	League	GP	G	A	Pts	PIM	GP	G	A	Pts	PIM
2002–03	Neftekhimik Nizhnekamsk-2	Russia3	38	3	4	7	16	—	—	—	—	—
2003–04	Neftekhimik Nizhnekamsk-2	Russia3	54	13	10	23	38	—	—	—	—	—
2004–05	Neftyanik Leninogorsk	Russia2	14	0	0	0	10	—	—	—	—	—
2004–05	Neftekhimik Nizhnekamsk	Russia	1	0	0	0	0	—	—	—	—	—
2004–05	Neftekhimik Nizhnekamsk-2	Russia3	46	17	13	30	84	—	—	—	—	—
2004–05	Toros Neftekamsk	Russia3	3	1	0	1	4	—	—	—	—	—
2005–06	Neftekhimik Nizhnekamsk	Russia	47	5	3	8	65	4	1	0	1	2
2006–07	Neftekhimik Nizhnekamsk	Russia	24	3	6	9	6	2	0	0	0	0
2007–08	Neftekhimik Nizhnekamsk	Russia	12	1	1	2	2	2	0	0	0	2
2008–09	Neftekhimik Nizhnekamsk	KHL	6	0	0	0	12	—	—	—	—	—
2008–09	Neftyanik Leninogorsk	Russia2	37	8	8	16	67	—	—	—	—	—
2009–10	Amur Khabarovsk	KHL	42	3	3	6	8	—	—	—	—	—
2010–11	Amur Khabarovsk	KHL	54	12	13	25	21	—	—	—	—	—
2011–12	Amur Khabarovsk	KHL	33	2	10	12	4	—	—	—	—	—
2011–12	Torpedo Nizhny Novgorod	KHL	8	0	1	1	0	5	0	0	0	0
2012–13	Traktor Chelyabinsk	KHL	5	0	0	0	0	—	—	—	—	—
2013–14	Kazzinc-Torpedo	VHL	13	0	4	4	2	—	—	—	—	—
2013–14	Yuzhny Ural Orsk	VHL	14	1	9	10	0	9	2	1	3	29
2014–15	Yuzhny Ural Orsk	VHL	5	0	0	0	6	—	—	—	—	—
KHL totals			148	17	27	44	45	5	0	0	0	0
