= Maroš Žemba =

Slovak ice hockey player

- Born: September 25, 1986 (age 39) Poprad, Czechoslovakia
- Height: 5 ft 11 in (180 cm)
- Weight: 174 lb (79 kg; 12 st 6 lb)
- Position: Defence
- Shoots: Left
- Slovak Extraliga team: HK SKP Poprad
- NHL draft: Undrafted
- Playing career: 2006–present

Maroš Žemba (born September 25, 1986) is a Slovak professional ice hockey defenceman who played with HK SKP Poprad in the Slovak Extraliga during the 2010–11 season.
