= Lou Yue =

Chinese ice hockey player

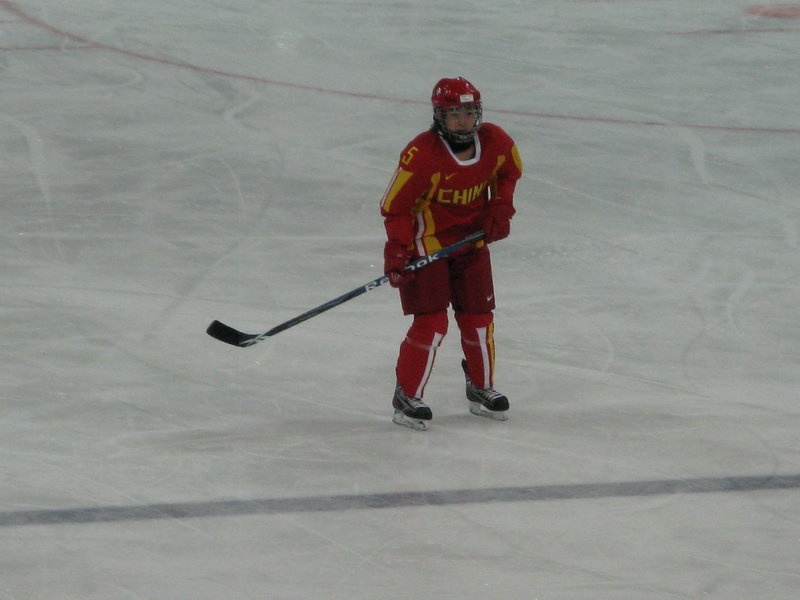
- Lou in a match against Russia at the 2010 Winter Olympics
- Born: 22 April 1987 (age 39) Harbin, Heilongjiang, China
- Height: 160 cm (5 ft 3 in)
- Weight: 65 kg (143 lb; 10 st 3 lb)
- Position: Defence
- Shot: Right
- Played for: Harbin Ice Hockey
- National team: China
Medal record
Women's ice hockey
Asian Winter Games
Bronze medal – third place	2011 Astana–Almaty

Lou Yue (simplified Chinese: 娄月; traditional Chinese: 婁月; pinyin: Lóu Yuè; born 22 April 1987) is a Chinese retired ice hockey player. She was a member of the Chinese women's national ice hockey team and represented China in the women's ice hockey tournament at the 2010 Winter Olympics.
