= Tang Liang (ice hockey) =

Chinese ice hockey player

Tang Liang 唐靚
- Born: 26 August 1985 (age 41) Harbin, Heilongjiang, China
- Height: 157 cm (5 ft 2 in)
- Weight: 78 kg (172 lb; 12 st 4 lb)
- Position: Forward
- Shoots: Left
- ZhHL team Former teams: Shenzhen KRS Vanke Rays; Team China (Naisten SM-sarja)
- National team: China
- Playing career: 2003–present
Medal record
Women's ice hockey
Representing China
Asian Winter Games
Bronze medal – third place	2011 Kazakhstan

Tang Liang (simplified Chinese: 唐靓; traditional Chinese: 唐靚; pinyin: Táng Liàng; born 26 August 1985) is a Chinese ice hockey player who currently plays with the Shenzhen KRS Vanke Rays of the Women's Hockey League.

Tang competed with the Chinese national team from 2003 to 2013, notably playing in the women's ice hockey tournament at the 2010 Winter Olympics and in the women's ice hockey tournament at the 2011 Asian Winter Games, where China won bronze.
