= Monika Kvaková =

Slovak ice hockey player

- Born: December 15, 1988 (age 37) Žiar nad Hronom, Czechoslovakia
- Height: 5 ft 5 in (165 cm)
- Weight: 134 lb (61 kg; 9 st 8 lb)
- Position: Goaltender
- team: Slovan Bratislava
- National team: Slovakia
- Playing career: 2009–present

Monika Kvakova (born December 15, 1988, in Žiar nad Hronom, Slovakia), is a Slovak female goaltender. Kvakova participated in the 2010 Vancouver Winter Games for Slovakia.

== Playing career ==
She was part of the Slovakian roster that defeated Bulgaria by an 82–0 score in September 2008 in the Olympic Pre-Qualification tournament in Latvia. In the win, she accumulated 11 points. Kavkova logged all sixty minutes of the game as she earned the shutout. Of note, the Bulgarian team was unable to record one shot on net.

In 2009, she was part of the roster at the 2009 IIHF World Women's Championship Division I, which was played in Graz, Austria. She was part of the Slovak team that qualified for the top division of the 2011 World Women's Championships.

Kvakova played one game for Slovakia at the 2011 IIHF 12 Nations Tournament on August 27. Versus Canada, she allowed a hat trick from Vicki Bendus as Canada outshot Slovakia 73–8.

=== Vancouver Winter Games ===
She was part of the first Slovakian women's ice hockey team that competed in the Winter Olympic games. She was the backup to Zuzana Tomcikova in the 2010 Olympics. It was the first time that Slovakia competed in women's ice hockey outside of Europe. She did not log any minutes in the Olympic tournament as Slovakia finished in eighth place.

== Career stats ==
=== IIHF ===
Year	Event	GP	Mins	W	L	T	GAA	Sv %
2011	IIHF 12 Nations Tournament	1	60	0	0	0	11.00	.849
