= Radovan Trefný =

Sloav ice hockey defenceman

- Born: September 20, 1987 (age 38) Trenčín, Czechoslovakia
- Height: 6 ft 2 in (188 cm)
- Weight: 187 lb (85 kg; 13 st 5 lb)
- Position: Defence
- Shot: Left
- Played for: HK Dukla Trenčín; HK Nitra; Lions de Lyon; ŠHK 37 Piešťany
- Playing career: 2005–2018

Radovan Trefný (born September 20, 1987) is a Slovak former professional ice hockey defenceman.

Trefný played 234 regular season games in the Tipsport Liga for HK Dukla Trenčín, HK Nitra and ŠHK 37 Piešťany. He also played in the Ligue Magnus for Lions de Lyon during the 2014–15 season before returning to Dukla Trenčín on May 25, 2015. He returned to France the following year with Dogs de Cholet of the FFHG Division 1.
