= 2009 Winter Universiade =

Multi-sport event in Harbin, China

XXIV Winter Universiade 第24届冬季世界大学生运动会
- Slogan: "Youth, Future, Ice and Snow"
- Host city: Harbin, China
- Nations: 44
- Athletes: 2,326
- Events: 12 sports
- Opening: 18 February 2009
- Closing: 28 February 2009
- Opened by: Liu Yandong
- Athlete's Oath: Wang Fei
- Judge's Oath: Wang Shi'an
- Torch lighter: Zhang Dan and Zhang Hao
- Main venue: Harbin International Convention and Exhibition Center Stadium

The 2009 Winter Universiade, the XXIV Winter Universiade took place in Harbin, China. Student athletes from 44 countries took part in the games.

== Selection ==
Harbin was selected by FISU on January 10, 2005 over future 2011 Winter Universiade host city Erzurum. They were the only two candidates.

== Venues ==
Harbin now has four stadiums for international ice games and five training stadiums. Among the venues, the following are mentioned in the official web site:

- Yabuli Olympic Snow Sports Center (about 100 km from Harbin)
- Heilongjiang University
- Harbin International Conference Exhibition and Sports Center (Both stadium and gymnasium)

These venues were used for the Asian Games and were part of Harbin's unsuccessful application for the 2010 Winter Olympics.

There will be two athlete's villages, the main one in Harbin and the second one in Yabuli.

=== Sports ===
- Alpine skiing (10)
- Biathlon (9)
- Cross-country skiing (10)
- Curling (2)
- Figure skating (5)
- Freestyle skiing (5)
- Ice hockey (2)
- Nordic combined (3)
- Short track speed skating (10)
- Ski jumping (4)
- Snowboarding (6)
- Speed skating (14)

== Medal table ==
* Host nation (China)

Rank	Nation	Gold	Silver	Bronze	Total
1	China (CHN)*	18	18	12	48
2	Russia (RUS)	18	14	19	51
3	South Korea (KOR)	12	7	9	28
4	Japan (JPN)	9	8	3	20
5	Switzerland (SUI)	7	3	4	14
6	Austria (AUT)	4	3	2	9
7	France (FRA)	2	6	5	13
8	Poland (POL)	2	4	8	14
9	Netherlands (NED)	2	1	1	4
10	Sweden (SWE)	2	0	0	2
11	Canada (CAN)	1	4	1	6
12	Czech Republic (CZE)	1	3	5	9
13	Ukraine (UKR)	1	2	4	7
14	Germany (GER)	1	2	3	6
15	Israel (ISR)	1	0	0	1
16	Finland (FIN)	0	2	2	4
17	Slovakia (SVK)	0	1	2	3
18	Italy (ITA)	0	1	1	2
19	Belarus (BLR)	0	1	0	1
19	Norway (NOR)	0	1	0	1
Totals (20 entries)		81	81	81	243

== See also ==
- Sports in China
