= Ice hockey at the 2011 Winter Universiade =

Ice hockey at the XXV Winter Universiade
- Venue: Erzurum GSIM Ice Arena
- Dates: January 27–February 6, 2011
- Teams: 12 (men); 6 (women)

Ice hockey at the 2011 Winter Universiade was held from January 27 through February 6 at the Erzurum GSIM Ice Arena complex in Erzurum, generally called "3000 Ice Rink" and "500 Ice Rink" during Universiade in reference to the seating capacities of its two sheets of ice. In most cases, men's matches were played at 3000 Ice Rink and women's matches were played at 500 Ice Rink, although exceptions were made for the women's semifinals and medal games played in the larger rink, while some lower men's placement games were played in the smaller one. The selection of participating teams – 12 in the men's tournament and six in the women's tournament, including the hosting Turkey sides in both cases – was announced on August 27, 2010, while the draw to place the teams into their assigned pools took place on October 2, 2010.

== Venue ==
Erzurum
Men and Women
Erzurum GSIM Ice Arena
Capacity: 3000 and 500
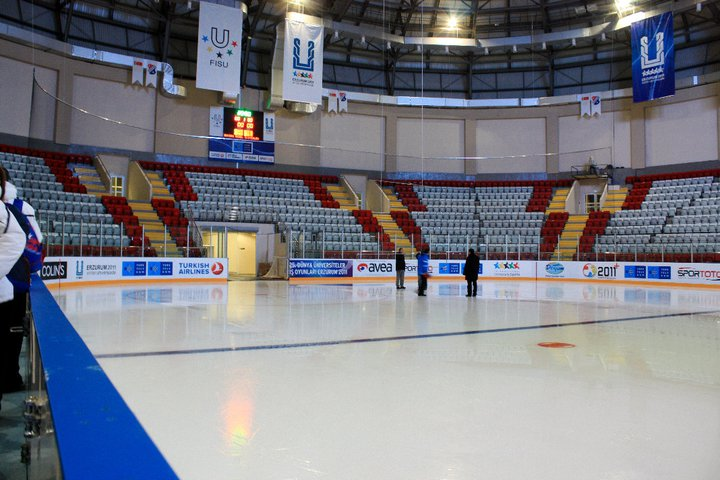

== Men ==
2011 Winter Universiade men's tournament
Tournament details
- Host country: Turkey
- Venue(s): 1 (in 1 host city)
- Dates: January 27 – February 6
- Teams: 12

Final positions
- Champions: Russia (5th title)
- Runner-up: Belarus
- Third place: Canada
- Fourth place: Kazakhstan

Tournament statistics
- Games played: 34
- Goals scored: 264 (7.76 per game)
- Attendance: 43,341 (1,275 per game)
- Scoring leader(s): (Canada) Brandon MacLean (13 points)

Official website
- universiadeerzurum.org

=== Preliminary round ===
Twelve participating teams were placed in the following three groups. After playing a round-robin, the top two teams in each group, plus the top two third-place teams, advanced to the quarterfinals.

Teams received 3 points for a regulation win, 2 points for an overtime/shootout win and 1 point for an overtime/shootout loss. They were seeded for the playoffs based first on placement within their pool, then by point total, then by fewest goals against.

All game box scores via fisu.net.

==== Group A ====
Team	Pld	W	OTW	OTL	L	GF	GA	GD	Pts	Qualification
Russia	3	3	0	0	0	34	3	+31	9	Advanced to quarterfinals
Japan	3	1	1	0	1	22	4	+18	5	Advanced to quarterfinals
Czech Republic	3	1	0	1	1	18	7	+11	4	Advanced to quarterfinals
Turkey	3	0	0	0	3	0	60	−60	0	9th–12th placement round

All times are local (UTC+2).

January 27, 2011; 9:30	Czech Republic	16–0 (2–0, 10–0, 4–0)	Turkey	3000 Ice Rink, Erzurum; Attendance: 650

Game reference

Jaroslav Chvatal
Goalies
Erol Kahraman
Eray Atali
Referee:
Mike Pearce (CAN)
Linesmen:
Andrew Hubbard (CAN)
Benoit Martineau (CAN)

3:30 – M. Vodny (J. Kaspar, J. Slahar) (PP)	1–0
13:40 – J. Berger (M. Vodny, J. Slahar)	2–0
20:57 – M. Spok (M. Ton, J. Soldan) (PP)	3–0
21:35 – Z. Vozdecky (M. Vodny, J. Kaspar)	4–0
24:39 – O. Martinik (J. Soldan, J. Kregl)	5–0
25:23 – P. Kriz (V. Nedrda, M. Ton)	6–0
29:53 – M. Vodny (J. Slahar)	7–0
31:06 – M. Spok (J. Soldan, D. Kares)	8–0
32:45 – J. Drak (J. Kaderabek, O. Martinik) (PP)	9–0
33:26 – M. Ton (P. Kriz, J. Loucka)	10–0
36:20 – M. Matous (O. Jezek, P. Kriz)	11–0
37:16 – V. Nedrda (SH)	12–0
46:42 –O. Jezek (T. Stryncl)	13–0
47:11 – J. Korotvicka (J. Berger, M. Spok)	14–0
48:39 – M. Matous (P. Kriz, Z. Vozdecky)	15–0
50:52 – J. Panuska (J. Soldan)	16–0

8 min
Penalties
8 min
58
Shots
8

January 27, 2011; 12:45	Russia	3–2 (0–0, 2–1, 1–1)	Japan	3000 Ice Rink, Erzurum; Attendance: 1000

Game reference

Emil Garipov
Goalies
Yuta Narisawa
Referee:
Martin Gasparik (SVK)
Linesmen:
Michal Orolin (SVK)
Peter Stano (SVK)

	0–1	20:43 – M. Sakagami (Y. Narisawa) (PP)
23:28 – S. Salnikov (S. Zuborev, S. Golovanov)	1–1
26:59 – E. Yakovlev (A. Lazarev, D. Golubev)	2–1
	2–2	41:54 – S. Ikeda (T. Gorai, Y. Takami)
45:25 – A. Ziazov (E. Yakovlev, Y. Alshevskiy)	3–2

6 min
Penalties
12 min
56
Shots
17

January 29, 2011; 12:00	Russia	5–1 (1–0, 1–1, 3–0)	Czech Republic	3000 Ice Rink, Erzurum; Attendance: 2000

Game reference

Emil Garipov
Goalies
Jaroslav Chvatal
Referee:
Linus Ohlund (SWE)
Linesmen:
Andrew Hubbard (CAN)
Timucin Ozbukucu (TUR)

15:17 – M. Valiullin (A. Sergeev, N. Lukyanchikov) (SH)	1–0
	1–1	22:08 – J. Berger (P. Kriz)
29:05 – E. Belukhin (M. Valiullin) (PP)	2–1
43:45 – V. Zhmaev (S. Zuborev)	3–1
54:12 – D. Golubev (Y. Alshevskiy)	4–1
56:31 – M. Valiullin (E. Belukhin) (PP)	5–1

28 min
Penalties
20 min
46
Shots
30

January 29, 2011; 16:00	Japan	18–0 (4–0, 5–0, 9–0)	Turkey	3000 Ice Rink, Erzurum; Attendance: 1000

Game reference

Tsutomu Kobayashi
Goalies
Erol Kahraman
Eray Atali
Referee:
Mike Pearce (CAN)
Linesmen:
Andreas Malmqvist (SWE)
Benoit Martineau (CAN)

3:49 – H. Ebata (I. Sato, M. Ebina) (PP)	1–0
11:47 – H. Terao (Y. Takami, N. Mizuuchi)	2–0
12:32 – Y. Takami (T. Gorai, S. Ikeda)	3–0
16:08 – N. Mizuuchi (H. Terao, R. Kaneko)	4–0
31:55 – N. Mizuuchi (H. Terao)	5–0
32:42 – H. Ebata (H. Haruta, M. Sakagami)	6–0
33:34 – R. Motono (T. Gorai, S. Ikeda)	7–0
34:39 – M. Sakagami (H. Terao, H. Ebata) (PP)	8–0
36:55 – H. Hozumi (D. Akimoto)	9–0
40:37 – I. Sato	10–0
42:10 – Y. Takami (S. Ikeda)	11–0
45:20 – H. Terao (R. Kaneko, M. Ushu)	12–0
50:52 – H. Haruta (PP)	13–0
52:02 – H. Haruta (R. Kaneko, R. Motono)	14–0
53:59 – S. Ikeda (Y. Takami, Y. Shinohara)	15–0
54:13 – H. Ebata (H. Haruta, M. Sakagami)	16–0
55:16 – N. Mizuuchi (H. Terao, R. Kaneko) (PP)	17–0
55:28 – H. Terao (M. Sakagami)	18–0

14 min
Penalties
30 min
74
Shots
8

January 31, 2011; 12:00	Japan	2–1 SO (0–0, 0–1, 1–0) (OT: 0–0) (SO: 1–0)	Czech Republic	3000 Ice Rink, Erzurum; Attendance: 2000

Game reference
Yuta Narisawa	Goalies	Jaroslav Chvatal	Referee: Kimmo Laakonen (FIN); Linesmen: Henri Neva (FIN); Timucin Ozbukucu (TUR)
/ 0–1 / 27:14 – V. Nedrda (O. Martinik, J. Kaderabek); 46:49 – H. Terao (PP) / 1–1			Referee: Kimmo Laakonen (FIN); Linesmen: Henri Neva (FIN); Timucin Ozbukucu (TUR)
H. Terao; R. Kaneko (miss); I. Sato (miss)	Shootout	(miss) M. Spok; (miss) J. Slahar; (miss) P. Kriz	Referee: Kimmo Laakonen (FIN); Linesmen: Henri Neva (FIN); Timucin Ozbukucu (TUR)
8 min	Penalties	20 min	Referee: Kimmo Laakonen (FIN); Linesmen: Henri Neva (FIN); Timucin Ozbukucu (TUR)
20	Shots	39	Referee: Kimmo Laakonen (FIN); Linesmen: Henri Neva (FIN); Timucin Ozbukucu (TUR)

January 31, 2011; 16:00	Turkey	0–26 (0–10, 0–10, 0–6)	Russia	3000 Ice Rink, Erzurum; Attendance: 1500

Game reference

Erol Kahraman
Eray Atali
Goalies
Evgeniy Orlov
Referee:
Mike Pearce (CAN)
Linesmen:
Andrew Hubbard (CAN)
Michal Orolin (SVK)

0–1	3:15 – V. Zhmaev (S. Golovanov, M. Sergeev)
0–2	3:47 – E. Belukhin (A. Lazarev)
0–3	5:01 – B. Shavaleev (R. Akhmetov, D. Golubev)
0–4	6:06 – S. Salnikov (V. Zhmaev, V. Seluyanov)
0–5	10:13 – A. Lazarev (D. Golubev, A. Sergeev)
0–6	10:52 – R. Akhmetov (Y. Alshevskiy, N. Lukyanchikov)
0–7	11:15 – S. Salnikov (V. Zhmaev)
0–8	11:48 – V. Seluyanov (E. Yakovlev, V. Tokranov)
0–9	16:14 – S. Golovanov (M. Sergeev, V. Seluyanov)
0–10	17:27 – Y. Alshevskiy (A. Sergeev, D. Golubev)
0–11	20:46 – S. Salnikov (A. Lazarev, S. Golovanov)
0–12	24:29 – B. Shavaleev (S. Belokon, E. Belukhin)
0–13	27:36 – N. Lukyanchikov (D. Golubev, Y. Alshevskiy)
0–14	30:55 – E. Belukhin (E. Yakovlev, A. Lazarev)
0–15	31:20 – Y. Alshevskiy (N. Lukyanchikov, R. Akhmetov)
0–16	32:39 – V. Zhmaev (S. Salnikov, S. Golovanov)
0–17	32:53 – B. Shavaleev (E. Yakovlev)
0–18	33:03 – D. Golubev (R. Akhmetov, Y. Alshevskiy)
0–19	34:04 – E. Belukhin (V. Tokranov, A. Lazarev)
0–20	39:58 – S. Golovanov (S. Salnikov, V. Zhmaev)
0–21	40:44 – S. Salnikov (S. Golovanov)
0–22	45:37 – V. Zhmaev (S. Golovanov, Y. Alshevskiy)
0–23	49:45 – E. Yakovlev (E. Belukhin, R. Akhmetov)
0–24	50:36 – S. Salnikov (S. Golovanov)
0–25	54:36 – R. Akhmetov (E. Belukhin)
0–26	56:59 – E. Belukhin (E. Yakovlev, V. Tokranov) (SH)

6 min
Penalties
10 min
7
Shots
92

==== Group B ====
Team	Pld	W	OTW	OTL	L	GF	GA	GD	Pts	Qualification
Belarus	3	2	1	0	0	16	4	+12	8	Advanced to quarterfinals
Canada	3	2	0	1	0	14	5	+9	7	Advanced to quarterfinals
Slovenia	3	1	0	0	2	11	16	−5	3	9th–12th placement round
South Korea	3	0	0	0	3	5	21	−16	0	9th–12th placement round

All times are local (UTC+2).

January 27, 2011; 16:00	Slovenia	0–9 (0–3, 0–2, 0–4)	Canada	3000 Ice Rink, Erzurum; Attendance: 500

Game reference

Jure Verlic
Goalies
Anthony Grieco
Jim Watt
Referee:
Kimmo Laakonen (FIN)
Linesmen:
Henri Neva (FIN)
Masi Puolakka (FIN)

0–1	8:53 – K. Turkiewicz (M. Methot)
0–2	14:38 – M. Caria (PP)
0–3	15:32 – C. Ray (Y. Farmanara)
0–4	21:07 – J. Rizk (B. MacLean, K. Baker)
0–5	25:45 – B. MacLean (K. Baker, J. Rizk)
0–6	41:04 – B. MacLean
0–7	42:35 – K. Sonnenburg (PP)
0–8	53:05 – M. Caria
0–9	55:17 – B. MacLean (K. Baker)

48 min
Penalties
10 min
22
Shots
47

January 28, 2011; 12:00	South Korea	1–8 (0–2, 0–6, 1–0)	Belarus	3000 Ice Rink, Erzurum; Attendance: 500

Game reference

Hwang Hyun-ho
Yong Hyun-ho
Goalies
Vitali Belinski
Referee:
Cinar Zeki Kuntel (TUR)
Linesmen:
Erhan Bulut (TUR)
Timucin Ozbukucu (TUR)

	0–1	2:41 – Y. Khuzeyeu (A. Kachan, A. Siomachkin)
	0–2	11:48 – P. Razvadovski (I. Kaznadey)
	0–3	20:52 – A. Kachan (K. Brykun) (SH)
	0–4	23:22 – I. Shvedau (M. Kharamanda) (PP)
	0–5	29:40 – A. Demkov (A. Haroshka, P. Razvadovski)
	0–6	31:09 – K. Brykun
	0–7	34:26 – I. Kaznadey (P. Razvadovski)
	0–8	37:28 – M. Susla (I. Shinkevich, I. Miadzel)
53:51 – Yoon J-m. (Lee Y-j.)	1–8

12 min
Penalties
10 min
17
Shots
61

January 29, 2011; 20:00	Canada	2–3 SO (0–1, 1–0, 1–1) (OT: 0–0) (SO: 0–1)	Belarus	3000 Ice Rink, Erzurum; Attendance: 1200

Game reference

Anthony Grieco
Goalies
Stepan Goryachevskikh
Referee:
Martin Gasparik (SVK)
Linesmen:
Michal Orolin (SVK)
Masi Puolakka (FIN)

	0–1	4:56 – A. Demkov (P. Razvadovski) (SH)
29:09 – J. Rizk (K. Turkiewicz, K. Sonnenburg) (PP)	1–1
55:43 – B. MacLean (M. Caria, K. Baker) (PP)	2–1
	2–2	59:11 – P. Razvadovski (A. Demkov)

B. MacLean
K. Baker (miss)
C. Ray (miss)
B. MacLean
B. MacLean (miss)
J. Rizk (miss)
Shootout
(miss) A. Demkov
P. Razvadovski
(miss) A. Siomachkin
A. Demkov
(miss) P. Razvadovski
A. Demkov
12 min
Penalties
20 min
44
Shots
37

January 30, 2011; 12:00	South Korea	2–10 (1–2, 0–3, 1–5)	Slovenia	3000 Ice Rink, Erzurum; Attendance: 2500

Game reference

Yong Hyun-ho
Lee Jung-taek
Goalies
Jure Verlic
Referee:
Martin Gasparik (SVK)
Linesmen:
Erhan Bulut (TUR)
Peter Stano (SVK)

	0–1	11:22 – J. Miljus (L. Basic) (PP)
	0–2	17:25 – K. Zbontar (M. Ahacic)
17:59 – Chung Y-j. (Lee D-m., Lee D-w.)	1–2
	1–3	30:36 – M. Ahacic (M. Ferlez)
	1–4	32:47 – M. Ahacic (M. Ferlez)
	1–5	39:22 – M. Ferlez (L. Basic, J. Miljus) (PP)
41:43 – Cho H-g. (Lee Y-j.) (PP)	2–5
	2–6	46:10 – K. Sodrznik (K. Ograjensek) (PP)
	2–7	48:15 – J. Miljus (M. Ferlez, D. Jemec) (PP)
	2–8	48:42 – K. Sodrznik (N. Lahajnar, K. Zbontar)
	2–9	52:43 – D. Rakanovic (J. Zupanc)
	2–10	59:29 – K. Sodrznik (G. Pihler, J. Zupanc) (PP)

47 min
Penalties
43 min
21
Shots
50

January 31, 2011; 20:00	Canada	3–2 (2–0, 0–2, 1–0)	South Korea	3000 Ice Rink, Erzurum; Attendance: 1000

Game reference

Jim Watt
Goalies
Hwang Hyun-ho
Referee:
Martin Gasparik (SVK)
Linesmen:
Erhan Bulut (TUR)
Peter Stano (SVK)

2:55 – C. Ray (K. Baker, G. Killing) (SH)	1–0
5:13 – C. Ray (F. Charland)	2–0
	2–1	31:22 – Kwon D-h. (Suh M-k.)
	2–2	38:10 – Jang J-y. (Suh M-k.) (PP)
50:43 – B. MacLean (D. Jalbert, M. Caria) (PP)	3–2

12 min
Penalties
10 min
62
Shots
16

February 1, 2011; 12:00	Belarus	5–1 (0–0, 3–1, 2–0)	Slovenia	3000 Ice Rink, Erzurum; Attendance: 2718

Game reference

Stepan Goryachevskikh
Goalies
Uros Pus
Referee:
Mike Pearce (CAN)
Linesmen:
Andreas Lunden (SWE)
Benoit Martineau (SWE)

	0–1	25:02 – N. Lahajnar (L. Basic, K. Zbontar)
34:33 – I. Miadzel (M. Susla, R. Azimov)	1–1
37:37 – K. Brykun (A. Kolosov, A. Kitarov) (PP)	2–1
38:51 – P. Razvadovski (M. Kharamanda, A. Pavlovich)	3–1
51:24 – A. Demkov (A. Pavlovich, I. Shvedau)	4–1
54:02 – M. Susla (K. Brykun, M. Kharamanda)	5–1

10 min
Penalties
6 min
29
Shots
18

==== Group C ====
Team	Pld	W	OTW	OTL	L	GF	GA	GD	Pts	Qualification
Kazakhstan	3	2	0	0	1	9	6	+3	6	Advanced to quarterfinals
Slovakia	3	2	0	0	1	17	10	+7	6	Advanced to quarterfinals
United States	3	2	0	0	1	11	9	+2	6	Advanced to quarterfinals
Spain	3	0	0	0	3	2	14	−12	0	9th–12th placement round

All times are local (UTC+2).

January 28, 2011; 16:00	Spain	1–8 (0–2, 1–2, 0–4)	Slovakia	3000 Ice Rink, Erzurum; Attendance: 700

Game reference

Ander Alcaine
Goalies
Michal Siarnik
Referee:
Linus Ohlund (SWE)
Linesmen:
Andreas Lunden (SWE)
Andreas Malmqvist (SWE)

	0–1	11:54 – M. Rais (B. Jankovsky, D. Puna) (PP)
	0–2	14:58 – J. Babic (M. Rais)
20:16 – P. Muñoz	1–2
	1–3	25:29 – D. Puna (M. Mikusovic, M. Hanciak)
	1–4	39:32 – P. Cizek (J. Babic)
	1–5	44:29 – P. Cizek (M. Babic)
	1–6	52:21 – D. Puna (R. Vojsovic)
	1–7	54:27 – T. Liptak (I. Slavik, L. Kacer)
	1–8	58:56 – M. Mikusovic (O. Zosiak, M. Hanciak)

8 min
Penalties
10 min
14
Shots
65

January 28, 2011; 20:00	Kazakhstan	5–0 (2–0, 1–0, 2–0)	United States	3000 Ice Rink, Erzurum; Attendance: 1100

Game reference

Pavel Zhitkov
Goalies
Erik Hudson
Referee:
Kimmo Laakonen (FIN)
Linesmen:
Andrew Hubbard (CAN)
Henri Neva (FIN)

1:47 – A. Petrov (A. Grichshenko, D. Ramazanov)	1–0
4:47 – M. Kachulin (G. Petrov) (PP)	2–0
28:33 – G. Petrov (D. Tikhonov, P. Zhilin) (PP)	3–0
41:03 – P. Zhilin	4–0
43:38 – A. Petrov (V. Fedossenko, A. Grichshenko)	5–0

14 min
Penalties
32 min
32
Shots
37

January 30, 2011; 16:00	Slovakia	3–7 (2–4, 1–2, 0–1)	United States	3000 Ice Rink, Erzurum; Attendance: 2200

Game reference

Peter Pus
Michal Siarnik
Goalies
Daniel Pyne
Referee:
Mike Pearce (CAN)
Linesmen:
Andreas Malmqvist (SWE)
Masi Puolakka (FIN)

3:12 – T. Liptak (I. Slavik)	1–0
	1–1	3:41 – M. Macari
	1–2	5:45 – K. Krannich (SH)
	1–3	11:44 – M. Macari (M. Lepre, J. Desano) (PP)
	1–4	15:03 – T. Ciaverilla (A. Dionne, K. Kranker) (PP)
17:55 – O. Zosiak (M. Mikusovic) (PP)	2–4
	2–5	23:32 – B. Contratto (K. Krannich)
29:04 – O. Zosiak (D. Rusnak, L. Vaskovic) (PP)	3–5
	3–6	31:21 – S. Balint (T. Pilmore, G. Gorczyca)
	3–7	57:31 – R. Collar (M. Macari)

34 min
Penalties
38 min
26
Shots
47

January 30, 2011; 20:00	Kazakhstan	2–0 (0–0, 0–0, 2–0)	Spain	3000 Ice Rink, Erzurum; Attendance: 1500

Game reference
Andrey Yankov	Goalies	Ander Alcaine	Referee: Cinar Zeki Kuntel (TUR); Linesmen: Andreas Lunden (SWE); Benoit Martineau (CAN)
47:23 – E. Mazula (P. Zhilin) / 1–0; 57:05 – E. Zhdanov (M. Kachulin) (EN) / 2–0			Referee: Cinar Zeki Kuntel (TUR); Linesmen: Andreas Lunden (SWE); Benoit Martineau (CAN)
4 min	Penalties	4 min	Referee: Cinar Zeki Kuntel (TUR); Linesmen: Andreas Lunden (SWE); Benoit Martineau (CAN)
67	Shots	16	Referee: Cinar Zeki Kuntel (TUR); Linesmen: Andreas Lunden (SWE); Benoit Martineau (CAN)

February 1, 2011; 16:00	United States	4–1 (0–0, 0–0, 4–1)	Spain	3000 Ice Rink, Erzurum; Attendance: 1918

Game reference

Daniel Pyne
Goalies
Ander Alcaine
Pablo Solorzano
Referee:
Cinar Zeki Kuntel (TUR)
Linesmen:
Michal Orolin (SVK)
Timucin Ozbukucu (TUR)

42:47 – D. Sheehan (D. Lassik)	1–0
	1–1	43:51 – J. Munoz (P. Puyuelo, A. Beltran)
44:06 – A. Dionne	2–1
48:04 – R. Collar (M. Macari)	3–1
52:38 – K. Krannich (B. Contratto)	4–1

6 min
Penalties
6 min
53
Shots
16

February 1, 2011; 20:00	Slovakia	6–2 (2–1, 2–0, 2–1)	Kazakhstan	3000 Ice Rink, Erzurum; Attendance: 1600

Game reference

Peter Pus
Goalies
Pavel Zhitkov
Referee:
Linus Ohlund (SWE)
Linesmen:
Andreas Malmqvist (SWE)
Masi Puolakka (FIN)

2:27 – D. Puna (T. Liptak, B. Jankovsky)	1–0
	1–1	10:58 – E. Zhdanov (M. Kachulin) (PP)
18:38 – M. Hanciak (L. Vaskovic, M. Mikusovic) (PP)	2–1
25:35 – J. Babic (P. Cizek, S. Rusnak)	3–1
29:53 – I. Slavik (L. Kacer, T. Liptak) (PP)	4–1
	4–2	47:25 – A. Ignatenko (SH)
54:53 – T. Liptak (P. Cizek)	5–2
57:47 – M. Hanciak (L. Vaskovic) (PP)	6–2

12 min
Penalties
34 min
38
Shots
29

=== 9th–12th placement round ===
All times are local (UTC+2).

February 3, 2011; 11:00	Slovenia	11–1 (5–1, 2–0, 4–0)	Turkey	500 Ice Rink, Erzurum; Attendance: 420

Game reference

Uros Pus
Goalies
Erol Kahraman
Referee:
Linus Ohlund (SWE)
Linesmen:
Cemal Ersin Kaya (TUR)
Michal Orolin (SVK)

4:27 – K. Sodrznik (L. Basic, M. Ferlez)	1–0
9:12 – N. Lahajnar (K. Ograjensek)	2–0
12:14 – J. Miljus (M. Ferlez)	3–0
14:35 – G. Pihler (T. Burazin, M. Potocnik) (PP)	4–0
	4–1	14:46 – E. Elevli (G. Cetinkaya)
18:24 – M. Ferlez (L. Basic, J. Miljus)	5–1
23:29 – N. Ulaga (M. Ahacic, D. Jemec) (PP)	6–1
30:27 – Z. Kuzman (K. Ograjensek) (SH)	7–1
43:29 – G. Pihler (J. Zupanc, D. Jemec) (PP)	8–1
50:16 – N. Lahajnar (PP)	9–1
51:54 – D. Jemec (K. Zbontar, J. Zupanc) (PP)	10–1
57:45 – J. Miljus (L. Basic, M. Ferlez)	11–1

14 min
Penalties
10 min
48
Shots
4

February 3, 2011; 12:00	Spain	5–4 SO (1–1, 2–1, 1–2) (OT: 0–0) (SO: 1–0)	South Korea	3000 Ice Rink, Erzurum; Attendance: 1215

Game reference

Ander Alcaine
Goalies
Hwang Hyun-ho
Yong Hyun-ho
Referee:
Cinar Zeki Kuntel (TUR)
Linesmen:
Benoit Martineau (CAN)
Arda Ozcelik (TUR)

4:55 – A. Betran (A. Pedraz, J. Munoz)	1–0
	1–1	17:39 – Yoon J-m. (Lee S-y.)
31:17 – A. Gonzalez (J. Munoz, A. Pedraz)	2–1
	2–2	31:47 – Yoon J-m. (Lee Y-j., Lee S-y.)
39:08 – G. Ansa (J. Munoz, J. Garcia-Arias)	3–2
	3–3	50:54 – Yoon J-m. (Park T-h., Lee Y-j.)
	3–4	51:15 – Cho H-g. (Jang J-y., Cho J-h.) (PP)
57:21 – A. Pedraz (P. Muñoz) (PP)	4–4

J. Munoz
A. Pedraz (miss)
P. Muñoz (miss)
Shootout
(miss) Yoon J-m.
(miss) Lee S-y.
(miss) Lee Y-j.
29 min
Penalties
39 min
35
Shots
36

==== 11th place match ====
February 4, 2011; 11:00	Turkey	1–4 (0–2, 0–0, 1–2)	South Korea	500 Ice Rink, Erzurum; Attendance: 300

Game reference

Erol Kahraman
Goalies
Lee Jung-taek
Referee:
Cinar Zeki Kuntel (TUR)
Linesmen:
Andreas Lunden (SWE)
Andreas Malmqvist (SWE)

	0–1	14:54 – Lee S-y.
	0–2	16:33 – Lee S-j. (Kwak H-k.)
	0–3	46:04 – Lee D-m. (Lee S-j.)
50:55 – K. Altuntas (E. Elevli)	1–3
	1–4	59:42 – Jang J-y. (EN)

18 min
Penalties
2 min
19
Shots
39

==== 9th place match ====
February 4, 2011; 12:00	Slovenia	8–0 (3–0, 3–0, 2–0)	Spain	3000 Ice Rink, Erzurum; Attendance: 970

Game reference

Jure Verlic
Goalies
Ander Alcaine
Pablo Solorzano
Referee:
Mike Pearce (CAN)
Linesmen:
Michal Orolin (SVK)
Timucin Ozbukucu (TUR)

2:24 – G. Pihler (R. Klavzar)	1–0
3:53 – Z. Kuzman (L. Basic)	2–0
13:20 – M. Potocnik (M. Ahacic, J. Zupanc) (PP)	3–0
21:56 – K. Zbontar (N. Lahajnar, Z. Kuzman)	4–0
24:06 – M. Ferlez (L. Basic, K. Sodrznik) (PP)	5–0
39:16 – N. Ulaga (M. Ahacic, D. Rakanovic) (PP)	6–0
47:37 – K. Ograjensek (M. Ahacic, N. Lahajnar)	7–0
58:08 – D. Rakanovic (M. Ferlez)	8–0

22 min
Penalties
8 min
49
Shots
18

=== Playoff round ===
Quarterfinals
1	Russia	6
8	Czech Republic	1
4	Canada	9
5	Slovakia	1
2	Belarus	6
7	United States	3
3	Kazakhstan	5
6	Japan	1

Semifinals
1	Russia	4
4	Canada	2
2	Belarus	3
3	Kazakhstan	1

Gold Medal
1	Russia	1
2	Belarus	0
Bronze Medal
3	Kazakhstan	1
4	Canada	3

All times are local (UTC+2).

==== Quarterfinals ====
February 3, 2011; 15:00	Kazakhstan	5–1 (1–0, 1–0, 3–1)	Japan	3000 Ice Rink, Erzurum; Attendance: 1118

Game reference

Andrey Yankov
Goalies
Yuta Narisawa
Referee:
Martin Gasparik (SVK)
Linesmen:
Erhan Bulut (TUR)
Peter Stano (SVK)

5:21 – P. Zhilin (A. Ignatenko, D. Tikhonov)	1–0
39:41 – A. Lipin (M. Kachulin, E. Zhdanov) (PP)	2–0
46:32 – E. Zhdanov (A. Savchenko, A. Vyatkin) (PP)	3–0
	3–1	56:48 – R. Motono (R. Kaneko, M. Ushu) (PP)
59:03 – A. Ignatenko (EN)	4–1
59:51 – E. Zhdanov (A. Savchenko) (EN)	5–1

18 min
Penalties
20 min
50
Shots
24

February 3, 2011; 15:00	Canada	9–1 (4–0, 3–0, 2–1)	Slovakia	500 Ice Rink, Erzurum; Attendance: 220

Game reference

Anthony Grieco
Jim Watt
Goalies
Peter Pus
Referee:
Kimmo Laakonen (FIN)
Linesmen:
Andreas Lunden (SWE)
Henri Neva (FIN)

1:51 – M. Caria (B. MacLean) (PP)	1–0
3:50 – K. Baker (B. MacLean) (PP)	2–0
8:41 – Y. Farmanara (J. Smith)	3–0
19:53 – B. MacLean (K. Baker, D. Jalbert) (PP)	4–0
20:37 – B. MacLean (K. Sonnenburg, M. Caria) (PP)	5–0
34:49 – F. Charland (J. Rizk, K. Turkiewicz)	6–0
38:27 – M. Langelier-Parent (T. Priamo, S. Aarssen)	7–0
	7–1	50:05 – R. Vojsovic (L. Kacer)
58:03 – K. Baker (B. MacLean, J. Rizk)	8–1
59:01 – K. Turkiewicz (T. Kiriakou, D. Jalbert)	9–1

4 min
Penalties
36 min
38
Shots
16

February 3, 2011; 19:00	Russia	6–1 (2–1, 2–0, 2–0)	Czech Republic	3000 Ice Rink, Erzurum; Attendance: 1300

Game reference

Emil Garipov
Goalies
Jaroslav Chvatal
Daniel Kares
Referee:
Mike Pearce (CAN)
Linesmen:
Andreas Malmqvist (SWE)
Masi Puolakka (FIN)

5:15 – V. Zhmaev (PP)	1–0
	1–1	9:50 – T. Stryncl (J. Loucka, M. Vodny) (PP)
13:04 – Y. Alshevskiy (N. Lukyanchikov)	2–1
36:14 – A. Ziazov (A. Sergeev) (PP)	3–1
37:45 – M. Valiullin (S. Belokon, V. Tokranov) (PP)	4–1
40:48 – S. Belokon (V. Tokranov)	5–1
49:54 – A. Lazarev (D. Golubev, B. Shavaleev)	6–1

148 min
Penalties
166 min
35
Shots
35

February 3, 2011; 19:00	Belarus	6–3 (1–1, 2–2, 3–0)	United States	500 Ice Rink, Erzurum; Attendance: 456

Game reference

Stepan Goryachevskikh
Vitali Belinski
Goalies
Daniel Pyne
Referee:
Linus Ohlund (SWE)
Linesmen:
Andrew Hubbard (CAN)
Timucin Ozbukucu (TUR)

5:54 – A. Kolosov	1–0
	1–1	7:38 – M. Macari (R. Collar)
26:59 – R. Azimov (M. Susla, I. Shvedau)	2–1
29:13 – P. Razvadovski (A. Demkov)	3–1
	3–2	30:17 – A. Dionne
	3–3	31:36 – T. O'Brien (PP)
40:53 – A. Pavlovich (A. Demkov, P. Razvadovski) (PP)	4–3
58:48 – I. Miadzel (A. Kachan) (EN)	5–3
59:23 – A. Pavlovich	6–3

36 min
Penalties
28 min
33
Shots
25

==== 5th–8th placement matches ====
February 4, 2011; 15:00	Japan	3–5 (0–1, 1–2, 2–2)	United States	500 Ice Rink, Erzurum; Attendance: 415

Game reference

Yuta Narisawa
Goalies
Erik Hudson
Referee:
Martin Gasparik (SVK)
Linesmen:
Henri Neva (FIN)
Peter Stano (SVK)

	0–1	6:39 – M. Lepre (A. Hoffman) (SH)
30:45 – H. Terao (I. Sato, M. Sakagami) (PP)	1–1
	1–2	35:07 – A. Dionne
	1–3	39:22 – T. O'Brien (G. Gorczyca, T. Pilmore)
	1–4	45:23 – D. Sheehan (B. Contratto) (SH)
47:52 – R. Murakami (S. Ikeda)	2–4
49:40 – K. Yamada (Y. Takami) (PP)	3–4
	3–5	53:19 – K. Kranker (T. Ciaverilla, J. Desano) (PP)

12 min
Penalties
26 min
39
Shots
34

February 4, 2011; 19:00	Slovakia	3–2 (0–2, 2–0, 1–0)	Czech Republic	500 Ice Rink, Erzurum; Attendance: NA

Game reference

Peter Pus
Goalies
Daniel Kares
Referee:
Linus Ohlund (SWE)
Linesmen:
Andrew Hubbard (CAN)
Benoit Martineau (CAN)

	0–1	11:11 – O. Martinik (J. Slahar) (PP)
	0–2	19:13 – P. Kriz (V. Nedrda) (PP)
23:44 – L. Vaskovic (M. Hanciak)	1–2
35:48 – L. Vaskovic (M. Mikusovic) (PP)	2–2
53:42 – O. Zosiak (M. Hanciak, L. Vaskovic) (PP)	3–2

12 min
Penalties
8 min
18
Shots
36

==== 7th place match ====
February 5, 2011; 16:00	Japan	2–3 (2–1, 0–2, 0–0)	Czech Republic	500 Ice Rink, Erzurum; Attendance: 120

Game reference

Yuta Narisawa
Goalies
Jaroslav Chvatal
Referee:
Cinar Zeki Kuntel (TUR)
Linesmen:
Michal Orolin (SVK)
Timucin Ozbukucu (TUR)

0:16 – H. Ebata (H. Terao, M. Sakagami)	1–0
	1–1	15:40 – T. Stryncl (V. Nedrda)
18:18 – Y. Takami (J. Yamada)	2–1
	2–2	20:11 – P. Kriz (J. Kaderabek, T. Stryncl)
	2–3	33:36 – M. Spok (M. Matous)

12 min
Penalties
4 min
22
Shots
34

==== 5th place match ====
February 5, 2011; 20:00	Slovakia	4–3 (1–0, 2–0, 1–3)	United States	500 Ice Rink, Erzurum; Attendance: 106

Game reference

Peter Pus
Goalies
Daniel Pyne
Referee:
Mike Pearce (CAN)
Linesmen:
Erhan Bulut (TUR)
Benoit Martineau (CAN)

2:46 – I. Slavik (T. Volek, T. Liptak)	1–0
22:01 – M. Hanciak	2–0
39:51 – D. Legersky (P. Cizek) (PP)	3–0
	3–1	48:55 – A. Dionne (M. Macari, D. Lassik) (PP)
	3–2	51:00 – T. O'Brien (M. Macari, J. Telfer) (PP)
51:27 – T. Volek (L. Kacer)	4–2
	4–3	59:42 – D. Lassik (A. Dionne, T. O'Brien)

24 min
Penalties
14 min
28
Shots
28

==== Semifinals ====
February 5, 2011; 16:30	Belarus	3–1 (1–0, 1–1, 1–0)	Kazakhstan	3000 Ice Rink, Erzurum; Attendance: 2720

Game reference

Vitali Belinski
Goalies
Pavel Zhitkov
Referee:
Martin Gasparik (SVK)
Linesmen:
Henri Neva (FIN)
Peter Stano (SVK)

19:08 – I. Shvedau (A. Demkov, P. Razvadovski) (PP)	1–0
26:09 – E. Nogachev (A. Siomachkin, A. Kachan) (PP)	2–0
	2–1	35:32 – E. Zhdanov (M. Kachulin)
41:30 – P. Razvadovski (A. Demkov, A. Haroshka)	3–1

14 min
Penalties
8 min
37
Shots
31

February 5, 2011; 20:00	Russia	4–2 (1–1, 1–0, 2–1)	Canada	3000 Ice Rink, Erzurum; Attendance: 2825

Game reference

Emil Garipov
Goalies
Anthony Grieco
Referee:
Linus Ohlund (SWE)
Linesmen:
Andreas Lunden (SWE)
Masi Puolakka (FIN)

3:11 – Y. Alshevskiy (S. Belokon)	1–0
	1–1	8:10 – M. Dorion (B. MacLean, Y. Farmanara)
27:48 – V. Zhmaev	2–1
41:29 – A. Lazarev (R. Akhmetov)	3–1
	3–2	42:04 – B. MacLean (M. Caria, K. Sonnenburg) (PP)
59:55 – M. Valiullin (EN)	4–2

53 min
Penalties
32 min
32
Shots
24

==== Bronze medal match ====
February 6, 2011; 11:30	Kazakhstan	1–3 (0–1, 0–1, 1–1)	Canada	3000 Ice Rink, Erzurum; Attendance: 2235

Game reference

Pavel Zhitkov
Goalies
Anthony Grieco
Referee:
Martin Gasparik (SVK)
Linesmen:
Andreas Malmqvist (SWE)
Masi Puolakka (FIN)

	0–1	18:38 – M. Langelier-Parent (K. Turkiewicz)
	0–2	28:09 – Y. Farmanara (K. Baker, T. Priamo)
	0–3	46:39 – K. Sonnenburg (M. Caria, D. Jalbert) (PP)
49:11 – M. Kachulin (E. Zhdanov)	1–3

10 min
Penalties
28 min
31
Shots
46

==== Gold medal match ====
February 6, 2011; 15:00	Russia	1–0 (1–0, 0–0, 0–0)	Belarus	3000 Ice Rink, Erzurum; Attendance: 3085

Game reference
Emil Garipov	Goalies	Stepan Goryachevskikh	Referee: Mike Pearce (CAN); Linesmen: Andrew Hubbard (CAN); Peter Stano (SVK)
5:44 – S. Salnikov (S. Golovanov) / 1–0			Referee: Mike Pearce (CAN); Linesmen: Andrew Hubbard (CAN); Peter Stano (SVK)
8 min	Penalties	14 min	Referee: Mike Pearce (CAN); Linesmen: Andrew Hubbard (CAN); Peter Stano (SVK)
30	Shots	23	Referee: Mike Pearce (CAN); Linesmen: Andrew Hubbard (CAN); Peter Stano (SVK)

=== Final standings ===
1st place, gold medalist(s)	Russia
2nd place, silver medalist(s)	Belarus
3rd place, bronze medalist(s)	Canada
4	Kazakhstan
5	Slovakia
6	United States
7	Czech Republic
8	Japan
9	Slovenia
10	Spain
11	South Korea
12	Turkey

=== Scoring leaders ===
List shows the top skaters sorted by points, then goals.

Player	GP	G	A	Pts	+/−	PIM	POS
(Canada) Brandon MacLean	6	8	5	13	+5	12	F
(Japan) Hiromichi Terao	6	6	5	11	−1	2	F
(Belarus) Pavel Razvadovski	6	5	5	10	+10	10	F
(Russia) Yaroslav Alshevskiy	6	4	6	10	+8	27	F
(Slovenia) Marko Ferlez	5	3	7	10	+3	2	F
(Russia) Stanislav Golovanov	6	2	8	10	+11	4	F
(Russia) Sergey Salnikov	6	7	2	9	+14	4	F
(Russia) Vladimir Zhmaev	6	6	3	9	+13	4	F
(Russia) Evgeny Belukhin	6	5	4	9	+9	16	F
(Belarus) Artem Demkov	6	4	5	9	+9	6	F
(Canada) Kevin Baker	6	2	7	9	+5	4	F
(Canada) Matt Caria	6	3	5	8	+1	2	F
(Russia) Anton Lazarev	6	3	5	8	+11	6	F
(Russia) Denis Golubev	6	2	6	8	+11	24	F
(Slovenia) Luka Basic	5	0	8	8	+4	0	F

GP = Games played; G = Goals; A = Assists; Pts = Points; +/− = Plus/minus; PIM = Penalties in minutes; POS = Position
Source: fisu.net

=== Leading goaltenders ===
Only the top seven goaltenders, based on save percentage, who have played at least 40% of their team's minutes, are included in this list.

Player	TOI	GA	GAA	SA	Sv%	SO
(Belarus) Vitali Belinski	148:24	2	0.81	59	96.61	0
(Russia) Emil Garipov	300:00	6	1.20	128	95.31	1
(Canada) Anthony Grieco	273:28	7	1.54	125	94.40	0
(Belarus) Stepan Goryachevskikh	215:58	7	1.94	105	93.33	0
(Japan) Yuta Narisawa	303:07	15	2.97	210	92.86	0
(Kazakhstan) Pavel Zhitkov	239:02	12	3.01	158	92.41	1
(Spain) Ander Alcaine	293:10	24	4.91	263	90.87	0

TOI = Time on Ice (minutes:seconds); SA = Shots against; GA = Goals against; GAA = Goals against average; Sv% = Save percentage; SO = Shutouts
Source: fisu.net

== Women ==
2011 Winter Universiade women's tournament
Tournament details
- Host country: Turkey
- Venue(s): 1 (in 1 host city)
- Dates: January 27 – February 5
- Teams: 6

Final positions
- Champions: Canada (2nd title)
- Runner-up: Finland
- Third place: Slovakia
- Fourth place: United States

Tournament statistics
- Games played: 20
- Goals scored: 191 (9.55 per game)
- Attendance: 14,068 (703 per game)
- Scoring leader(s): (Finland) Venla Hovi (19 points)

Official website
- universiadeerzurum.org

=== Preliminary round ===
Six participating teams were placed into a single group. After playing a round-robin, the teams ranked first through fourth advanced to the semifinals.

Teams received 3 points for a regulation win, 2 points for an overtime/shootout win and 1 point for an overtime/shootout loss.

All game box scores via fisu.net.

Team	Pld	W	OTW	OTL	L	GF	GA	GD	Pts	Qualification
Canada	5	4	1	0	0	39	1	+38	14	Advanced to semifinals
Finland	5	4	0	1	0	49	3	+46	13	Advanced to semifinals
Slovakia	5	3	0	0	2	33	11	+22	9	Advanced to semifinals
United States	5	2	0	0	3	25	18	+7	6	Advanced to semifinals
Great Britain	5	1	0	0	4	11	36	−25	3	5th place match
Turkey	5	0	0	0	5	0	88	−88	0	5th place match

All times are local (UTC+2).

January 27, 2011; 9:30	United States	1–5 (0–2, 1–1, 0–2)	Slovakia	500 Ice Rink, Erzurum; Attendance: 100

Game reference

Heather Rossi
Goalies
Zuzana Tomcikova
Referee:
Kaisa Ketonen (FIN)
Linesmen:
Jenni Herranen (FIN)
Karolin Strom (SWE)

	0–1	12:59 – L. Krajnakova (P. Jurcova)
	0–2	13:36 – N. Gapova (P. Pravlikova, I. Karafiatova)
	0–3	20:48 – M. Velickova (A. Dzurnakova)
30:20 – S. Redick (A. Rumsey)	1–3
	1–4	40:42 – J. Culikova (P. Pravlikova, N. Gapova) (PP)
	1–5	59:36 – N. Gapova (J. Culikova, M. Velickova) (PP)

14 min
Penalties
8 min
11
Shots
23

January 27, 2011; 12:45	Great Britain	10–0 (2–0, 3–0, 5–0)	Turkey	500 Ice Rink, Erzurum; Attendance: 400

Game reference

Laura Saunders
Lita-lee Jarrold
Goalies
Mine Gungor
Referee:
Zuzanna Findorova (SVK)
Linesmen:
Magdalena Cerhitova (SVK)
Susan Collins (USA)

3:00 – G. Farman (L. Halliwell) (PP)	1–0
7:37 – E. Turner	2–0
22:18 – G. Farman (L. Price, S. Grieve)	3–0
32:45 – J. Bolton (E. Turner, A. Emery) (PP)	4–0
37:53 – G. Farman (J. Bolton)	5–0
41:59 – P. Wilson (K. Wiggins, L. Summers)	6–0
46:40 – K. Wiggins (L. Price) (PP)	7–0
48:29 – S. Herbert (E. Turner)	8–0
49:59 – G. Farman (L. Price)	9–0
54:25 – L. Summers (S. Herbert, A. Carr)	10–0

8 min
Penalties
14 min
32
Shots
6

January 27, 2011; 16:00	Canada	2–1 SO (0–0, 0–1, 1–0) (OT: 0–0) (SO: 1–0)	Finland	500 Ice Rink, Erzurum; Attendance: 100

Game reference
Liz Knox	Goalies	Anna Vanhatalo	Referee: Karen Philippo (BEL); Linesmen: Jessica Hahnle (USA); Michaela Kudelova (SVK)
/ 0–1 / 25:09 – V. Hovi (A. Rajahuhta) (SH); 58:31 – M. Provost (PP) / 1–1			Referee: Karen Philippo (BEL); Linesmen: Jessica Hahnle (USA); Michaela Kudelova (SVK)
J. Zerafa (miss); A. Bettez (miss); C. Unruh (miss); M. Provost (miss); E. Seedhouse	Shootout	(miss) S. Karna; (miss) S. Tuominen; (miss) A. Helin; (miss) S. Karna; (miss) A. Helin	Referee: Karen Philippo (BEL); Linesmen: Jessica Hahnle (USA); Michaela Kudelova (SVK)
10 min	Penalties	18 min	Referee: Karen Philippo (BEL); Linesmen: Jessica Hahnle (USA); Michaela Kudelova (SVK)
19	Shots	8	Referee: Karen Philippo (BEL); Linesmen: Jessica Hahnle (USA); Michaela Kudelova (SVK)

January 28, 2011; 11:00	United States	15–0 (8–0, 5–0, 2–0)	Turkey	500 Ice Rink, Erzurum; Attendance: 150

Game reference

Katie Vaughan
Goalies
Berfu Merve Bolulu
Mine Gungor
Referee:
Zuzanna Findorova (SVK)
Linesmen:
Michaela Kudelova (SVK)
Karolin Strom (SWE)

1:14 – M. Winters	1–0
2:12 – T. Payne (J. Ducie)	2–0
5:02 – S. Redick (R. Weaver) (SH)	3–0
7:23 – S. Crawford (M. Winters)	4–0
10:28 – E. Wynn (S. Kucharski, J. Ducie)	5–0
11:07 – E. Wynn (S. Kucharski, J. Ducie)	6–0
12:39 – C. Young (A. Rumsey, J. Ducie)	7–0
17:36 – E. Nelson (S. Crawford, J. Ducie) (PP)	8–0
22:54 – J. Ducie (M. Winters, D. Rohlik)	9–0
27:48 – A. Rumsey (S. Redick, D. Rohlik)	10–0
28:20 – R. Weaver (A. Rumsey)	11–0
34:26 – E. Nelson (C. Hoium, L. Reihl)	12–0
35:49 – D. Rohlik (T. Juha, J. Ducie)	13–0
53:20 – A. Arcibal (C. Hoium)	14–0
57:53 – T. Juha	15–0

2 min
Penalties
8 min
34
Shots
2

January 28, 2011; 15:00	Finland	6–0 (3–0, 2–0, 1–0)	Great Britain	500 Ice Rink, Erzurum; Attendance: 200

Game reference

Linda Selkee
Goalies
Laura Saunders
Referee:
Leah O'Brian (USA)
Linesmen:
Magdalena Cerhitova (SVK)
Merve Sarimert (TUR)

9:30 – A. Helin (A. Rajahuhta)	1–0
18:18 – A. Rajahuhta (A. Helin) (SH)	2–0
18:37 – S. Karna	3–0
36:22 – S. Korhonen (T. Saarimaki, A. Helin)	4–0
37:34 – S. Tuominen (S. Karna, E. Hallvar)	5–0
49:49 – S. Tuominen (A. Tuomanen, K. Rahunen)	6–0

10 min
Penalties
10 min
57
Shots
6

January 28, 2011; 19:00	Canada	3–0 (3–0, 0–0, 0–0)	Slovakia	500 Ice Rink, Erzurum; Attendance: 350

Game reference

Beth Clause
Goalies
Zuzana Tomcikova
Referee:
Kaisa Ketonen (FIN)
Linesmen:
Susan Collins (USA)
Jenni Herranen (FIN)

9:36 – J. Zerafa (A. Boras)	1–0
15:53 – B. George (K. Deschênes, A. Miles) (PP)	2–0
16:30 – E. Lally (J. Zerafa, C. Styles)	3–0

8 min
Penalties
8 min
47
Shots
6

January 30, 2011; 11:00	Canada	14–0 (4–0, 4–0, 6–0)	Great Britain	500 Ice Rink, Erzurum; Attendance: 322

Game reference

Liz Knox
Goalies
Lita-lee Jarrold
Referee:
Zuzanna Findorova (SVK)
Linesmen:
Jenni Herranen (FIN)
Merve Sarimert (TUR)

1:19 – K. Deschênes (A. Martin)	1–0
4:15 – B. George (J. Downey)	2–0
5:14 – A. Bettez (J. Sollis, A. Boras)	3–0
14:45 – A. Bettez (A. Boras)	4–0
27:55 – C. Unruh (B. George, J. Leblanc)	5–0
28:05 – B. George (C. Unruh, J. Leblanc)	6–0
29:45 – K. Webster (E. Lally)	7–0
32:13 – C. Styles	8–0
42:09 – B. George (A. Martin)	9–0
43:57 – C. Styles (A. Boras)	10–0
48:55 – J. Leblanc (C. Unruh)	11–0
50:51 – C. Styles (E. Lally, B. George)	12–0
55:19 – C. Styles (A. Martin, A. Boras)	13–0
57:58 – J. Leblanc (A. Boras)	14–0

0 min
Penalties
2 min
48
Shots
4

January 30, 2011; 15:00	Finland	3–1 (0–0, 2–0, 1–1)	United States	500 Ice Rink, Erzurum; Attendance: 350

Game reference

Anna Vanhatalo
Goalies
Heather Rossi
Referee:
Karen Philippo (BEL)
Linesmen:
Magdalena Cerhitova (SVK)
Michaela Kudelova (SVK)

24:44 – V. Hovi (A. Helin)	1–0
27:26 – S. Tuominen (A. Rajahuhta)	2–0
	2–1	57:09 – M. Winters (S. Crawford) (PP)
59:03 – V. Hovi (EN)	3–1

4 min
Penalties
12 min
39
Shots
13

January 30, 2011; 19:00	Turkey	0–20 (0–9, 0–6, 0–5)	Slovakia	500 Ice Rink, Erzurum; Attendance: 425

Game reference

Mine Gungor
Berfu Merve Bolulu
Goalies
Monika Kvakova
Referee:
Leah O'Brian (USA)
Linesmen:
Jessica Hahnle (USA)
Karolin Strom (SWE)

0–1	1:02 – M. Velickova (J. Culikova, P. Pravlikova)
0–2	1:41 – I. Karafiatova (P. Pravlikova, V. Kasperova)
0–3	5:55 – J. Stofanikova (K. Vybostokova) (PP)
0–4	7:49 – V. Kasperova (J. Stofanikova, M. Velickova)
0–5	11:21 – A. Dzurnakova (M. Herichova, P. Jurcova) (PP)
0–6	12:25 – J. Culikova (M. Velickova, P. Pravlikova)
0–7	13:54 – J. Stofanikova (K. Vybostokova, N. Gapova)
0–8	14:16 – P. Jurcova (M. Herichova, A. Dzurnakova)
0–9	18:23 – M. Velickova (I. Karafiatova, P. Pravlikova) (PP)
0–10	21:07 – I. Karafiatova (M. Velickova, J. Culikova) (SH)
0–11	24:08 – A. Dzurnakova (P. Jurcova, M. Herichova) (PP)
0–12	24:27 – M. Velickova (J. Culikova, K. Bernatova)
0–13	24:47 – B. Kezmarska (B. Bremova)
0–14	36:23 – E. Buckova (I. Karafiatova, V. Kasperova)
0–15	38:57 – M. Velickova (J. Stofanikova, B. Kezmarska) (PP)
0–16	40:45 – P. Jurcova (M. Herichova, A. Dzurnakova)
0–17	42:07 – N. Gapova (S. Stofanikova, K. Vybostokova)
0–18	47:58 – S. Stofanikova (M. Staronova, V. Cernanova)
0–19	49:58 – I. Karafiatova (M. Velickova, J. Stofanikova) (PP)
0–20	51:44 – A. Dzurnakova (B. Kezmarska, E. Buckova)

14 min
Penalties
4 min
6
Shots
73

January 31, 2011; 11:00	United States	0–9 (0–3, 0–4, 0–2)	Canada	500 Ice Rink, Erzurum; Attendance: 375

Game reference

Heather Rossi
Katie Vaughan
Goalies
Beth Clause
Referee:
Kaisa Ketonen (FIN)
Linesmen:
Michaela Kudelova (SVK)
Karolin Strom (SWE)

0–1	1:55 – K. Deschênes (E. Lally)
0–2	12:06 – E. Lally (M. Provost)
0–3	13:56 – C. Hill (A. Miles)
0–4	20:26 – A. Bettez (B. George, A. Miles)
0–5	21:38 – J. Zerafa (C. Styles, K. Webster)
0–6	32:19 – E. Lally (K. Deschênes)
0–7	39:53 – B. George (A. Miles, A. Bettez)
0–8	46:18 – J. Zerafa (E. Seedhouse)
0–9	50:37 – A. Bettez (A. Miles, S. Fenerty)

10 min
Penalties
10 min
11
Shots
44

January 31, 2011; 15:00	Slovakia	8–0 (1–0, 6–0, 1–0)	Great Britain	500 Ice Rink, Erzurum; Attendance: 175

Game reference

Zuzana Tomcikova
Monika Kvakova
Goalies
Laura Saunders
Referee:
Karen Philippo (BEL)
Linesmen:
Susan Collins (USA)
Merve Sarimert (TUR)

9:10 – P. Jurcova (M. Herichova, A. Dzurnakova) (PP)	1–0
23:15 – A. Dzurnakova (P. Jurcova, M. Herichova)	2–0
23:57 – M. Herichova (SH)	3–0
28:01 – A. Dzurnakova (B. Kezmarska)	4–0
28:52 – N. Gapova (M. Velickova)	5–0
32:39 – P. Pravlikova	6–0
36:20 – B. Kezmarska (M. Staronova, J. Stofanikova)	7–0
44:44 – P. Jurcova (M. Herichova, A. Dzurnakova)	8–0

6 min
Penalties
22 min
39
Shots
6

January 31, 2011; 19:00	Finland	32–0 (7–0, 17–0, 8–0)	Turkey	500 Ice Rink, Erzurum; Attendance: 433

Game reference

Linda Selkee
Goalies
Mine Gungor
Berfu Merve Bolulu
Referee:
Leah O'Brian (USA)
Linesmen:
Jessica Hahnle (USA)
Karolin Strom (SWE)

7:22 – A. Helin (A. Rajahuhta, V. Hovi)	1–0
11:26 – S. Korhonen (A. Helin, S. Niemela)	2–0
12:48 – A. Tuomanen (S. Tuominen, S. Karna) (PP)	3–0
15:38 – V. Hovi (A. Rajahuhta, A. Helin)	4–0
17:19 – A. Helin (M. Ahvensalmi)	5–0
17:59 – T. Saarimaki (S. Niemela, S. Korhonen)	6–0
18:56 – A. Rajahuhta (V. Hovi, A. Helin)	7–0
20:10 – A. Tuomanen (K. Rahunen, S. Karna) (PP)	8–0
22:47 – J. Stoltenberg (A. Helin, V. Hovi)	9–0
23:19 – S. Korhonen (H. Turpeinen, M. Ahvensalmi)	10–0
24:22 – J. Juutilainen (M. Ahvensalmi, A. Kinisjarvi)	11–0
24:54 – A. Rajahuhta (V. Hovi, A. Helin)	12–0
25:56 – A. Tuomanen (S. Karna, S. Tuominen)	13–0
26:57 – A. Helin (A. Rajahuhta, V. Hovi)	14–0
28:09 – A. Kinisjarvi (J. Juutilainen, J. Stoltenberg)	15–0
30:12 – S. Tuominen (A. Tuomanen, K. Rahunen) (PP)	16–0
30:55 – V. Hovi (A. Rajahuhta, H. Turpeinen)	17–0
31:44 – J. Juutilainen	18–0
32:09 – A. Rajahuhta (A. Helin, V. Hovi)	19–0
34:57 – S. Karna (T. Saarimaki, J. Stoltenberg)	20–0
35:42 – J. Stoltenberg (V. Hovi, K. Rahunen)	21–0
37:44 – S. Tuominen (S. Karna, A. Tuomanen) (PP)	22–0
38:11 – T. Saarimaki (J. Juutilainen, H. Turpeinen)	23–0
39:13 – S. Tuominen	24–0
42:08 – J. Juutilainen (S. Korhonen, S. Niemela)	25–0
46:20 – S. Niemela (J. Juutilainen, S. Korhonen)	26–0
48:55 – A. Kinisjarvi (J. Stoltenberg, T. Saarimaki)	27–0
52:31 – A. Tuomanen	28–0
53:21 – V. Hovi (J. Stoltenberg, A. Rajahuhta)	29–0
55:22 – S. Tuominen (M. Ahvensalmi, S. Karna)	30–0
58:55 – S. Tuominen (A. Kinisjarvi, M. Ahvensalmi)	31–0
59:54 – V. Hovi (S. Tuominen, K. Rahunen)	32–0

4 min
Penalties
8 min
95
Shots
4

February 2, 2011; 12:30	Great Britain	1–8 (0–2, 1–3, 0–3)	United States	3000 Ice Rink, Erzurum; Attendance: 1500

Game reference

Laura Saunders
Goalies
Katie Vaughan
Referee:
Zuzanna Findorova (SVK)
Linesmen:
Merve Sarimert (TUR)
Karolin Strom (SWE)

	0–1	0:46 – M. Winters (R. Weaver) (PP)
	0–2	9:31 – R. Weaver (E. Wynn, A. Rumsey)
22:27 – G. Farman (A. Williams)	1–2
	1–3	31:00 – S. Crawford
	1–4	31:39 – A. Rumsey (C. Young)
	1–5	34:54 – T. Payne (D. Rohlik, C. Minnie)
	1–6	41:59 – C. Hoium (L. Reihl) (PP)
	1–7	42:47 – C. Young (A. Arcibal)
	1–8	54:05 – S. Jensen

6 min
Penalties
8 min
12
Shots
52

February 2, 2011; 16:00	Slovakia	0–7 (0–3, 0–2, 0–2)	Finland	3000 Ice Rink, Erzurum; Attendance: 1220

Game reference

Zuzana Tomcikova
Monika Kvakova
Goalies
Anna Vanhatalo
Referee:
Karen Philippo (BEL)
Linesmen:
Susan Collins (USA)
Jessica Hahnle (USA)

0–1	11:34 – S. Tuominen
0–2	17:46 – S. Korhonen (S. Tuominen, H. Turpeinen)
0–3	18:25 – J. Juutilainen (K. Rahunen, A. Kinisjarvi)
0–4	33:46 – A. Kinisjarvi (S. Tuominen)
0–5	39:30 – A. Rajahuhta (S. Tuominen) (PP)
0–6	43:30 – S. Tuominen (H. Turpeinen) (PP)
0–7	55:24 – J. Stoltenberg (A. Kinisjarvi) (PP)

18 min
Penalties
10 min
11
Shots
32

February 2, 2011; 20:00	Turkey	0–11 (0–4, 0–4, 0–3)	Canada	3000 Ice Rink, Erzurum; Attendance: NA

Game reference

Berfu Merve Bolulu
Goalies
Beth Clause
Referee:
Kaisa Ketonen (FIN)
Linesmen:
Jenni Herranen (FIN)
Michaela Kudelova (SVK)

0–1	0:29 – J. Sollis (B. George)
0–2	1:40 – C. Styles (J. Zerafa)
0–3	6:20 – B. George (A. Bettez)
0–4	9:36 – J. Leblanc (A. Ironside)
0–5	28:27 – E. Seedhouse (S. Fenerty)
0–6	32:21 – E. Seedhouse (C. Styles)
0–7	32:52 – K. Deschênes (A. Martin, J. Sollis)
0–8	33:40 – B. George (A. Bettez)
0–9	44:30 – A. Ironside (J. Leblanc, K. Webster)
0–10	44:59 – C. Styles (E. Seedhouse, J. Zerafa)
0–11	50:16 – C. Styles

4 min
Penalties
0 min
6
Shots
61

=== Playoff round ===
Semifinals
1	Canada	8
4	United States	1
2	Finland	5
3	Slovakia	1

Gold Medal
1	Canada	4
2	Finland	1
Bronze Medal
3	Slovakia	3
4	United States	1

All times are local (UTC+2).

==== Semifinals ====
February 4, 2011; 16:00	Finland	5–1 (3–0, 2–1, 0–0)	Slovakia	3000 Ice Rink, Erzurum; Attendance: 1060

Game reference

Anna Vanhatalo
Goalies
Zuzana Tomcikova
Referee:
Leah O'Brian (USA)
Linesmen:
Susan Collins (USA)
Jessica Hahnle (USA)

6:40 – A. Rajahuhta (V. Hovi, J. Stoltenberg)	1–0
7:57 – V. Hovi (A. Tuomanen, S. Tuominen)	2–0
16:07 – T. Saarimaki (J. Juutilainen, S. Korhonen)	3–0
25:56 – A. Helin (J. Juutilainen, V. Hovi)	4–0
27:44 – J. Juutilainen (V. Hovi, K. Rahunen) (PP)	5–0
	5–1	39:29 – M. Herichova

20 min
Penalties
14 min
42
Shots
11

February 4, 2011; 20:00	Canada	8–1 (2–1, 3–0, 3–0)	United States	3000 Ice Rink, Erzurum; Attendance: 1750

Game reference

Liz Knox
Beth Clause
Goalies
Heather Rossi
Referee:
Zuzanna Findorova (SVK)
Linesmen:
Magdalena Cerhitova (SVK)
Merve Sarimert (TUR)

1:50 – M. Provost (E. Lally)	1–0
12:46 – E. Seedhouse (J. Sollis)	2–0
	2–1	15:39 – C. Hoium (L. Reihl)
20:55 – C. Styles (S. Fenerty)	3–1
31:12 – A. Miles (A. Bettez)	4–1
37:49 – K. Webster (A. Miles, B. George)	5–1
40:39 – M. Provost (K. Deschênes)	6–1
47:29 – S. Fenerty (M. Provost)	7–1
58:12 – K. Deschênes (PP)	8–1

2 min
Penalties
18 min
56
Shots
7

==== 5th place match ====
February 5, 2011; 12:00	Great Britain	10–0 (5–0, 1–0, 4–0)	Turkey	500 Ice Rink, Erzurum; Attendance: 300

Game reference

Lita-lee Jarrold
Laura Saunders
Goalies
Berfu Merve Bolulu
Referee:
Karen Philippo (BEL)
Linesmen:
Susan Collins (USA)
Jessica Hahnle (USA)

2:22 – S. Herbert (E. Turner) (PP)	1–0
3:10 – J. Bolton (G. Farman)	2–0
4:43 – S. Herbert (E. Turner, L. Halliwell)	3–0
11:48 – H. Cornford	4–0
13:22 – P. Wilson (S. Grieve) (PP)	5–0
36:28 – J. Bolton	6–0
40:49 – A. Carr (E. Turner) (PP)	7–0
44:50 – S. Herbert (H. Cornford)	8–0
48:32 – H. Cornford	9–0
57:25 – L. Halliwell (PP)	10–0

4 min
Penalties
20 min
39
Shots
10

==== Bronze medal match ====
February 5, 2011; 9:30	Slovakia	3–1 (1–0, 0–0, 2–1)	United States	3000 Ice Rink, Erzurum; Attendance: 1247

Game reference

Zuzana Tomcikova
Goalies
Katie Vaughan
Referee:
Kaisa Ketonen (FIN)
Linesmen:
Jenni Herranen (FIN)
Karolin Strom (SWE)

10:51 – M. Velickova (N. Gapova)	1–0
40:41 – J. Culikova (M. Velickova, N. Gapova)	2–0
51:45 – M. Velickova (J. Culikova, B. Kezmarska) (PP)	3–0
	3–1	58:32 – S. Crawford (E. Nelson, M. Winters) (PP)

12 min
Penalties
12 min
21
Shots
28

==== Gold medal match ====
February 5, 2011; 13:00	Canada	4–1 (1–0, 2–0, 1–1)	Finland	3000 Ice Rink, Erzurum; Attendance: 2111

Game reference

Liz Knox
Goalies
Anna Vanhatalo
Referee:
Leah O'Brian (USA)
Linesmen:
Magdalena Cerhitova (SVK)
Michaela Kudelova (SVK)

18:29 – K. Deschênes	1–0
24:01 – J. Zerafa (C. Hill)	2–0
35:14 – A. Bettez (A. Boras, A. Ironside)	3–0
	3–1	42:19 – V. Hovi (A. Tuomanen) (PP)
56:27 – C. Hill (C. Styles, K. Webster) (PP)	4–1

4 min
Penalties
6 min
34
Shots
21

=== Final standings ===
1st place, gold medalist(s)	Canada
2nd place, silver medalist(s)	Finland
3rd place, bronze medalist(s)	Slovakia
4	United States
5	(United Kingdom) Great Britain
6	Turkey

=== Scoring leaders ===
List shows the top skaters sorted by points, then goals.

Player	GP	G	A	Pts	+/−	PIM	POS
(Finland) Venla Hovi	5	9	10	19	+18	2	F
(Finland) Saara Tuominen	7	10	7	17	+17	6	F
(Slovakia) Martina Veličková	7	7	7	14	+9	8	F
(Finland) Annina Rajahuhta	7	6	8	14	+17	2	F
(Finland) Anne Helin	6	5	9	14	+17	16	F
(Canada) Candice Styles	7	8	4	12	+16	2	F
(Canada) Breanne George	7	7	5	12	+14	0	F
(Slovakia) Anna Džurňáková	6	5	5	10	+8	0	F
(Finland) Johanna Juutilainen	7	5	5	10	+9	2	F
(Canada) Ann-Sophie Bettez	7	5	4	9	+13	2	F
(Finland) Anne Tuomanen	7	4	5	9	+7	4	F
(Slovakia) Mária Herichová	7	2	7	9	+6	6	F
(Canada) Kim Deschênes	7	5	3	8	+11	0	F
(Slovakia) Nikola Gápová	7	4	4	8	+9	0	F
(Slovakia) Petra Jurčová	7	4	4	8	+5	2	F
(Finland) Salla Korhonen	7	4	4	8	+7	4	F

GP = Games played; G = Goals; A = Assists; Pts = Points; +/− = Plus/minus; PIM = Penalties in minutes; POS = Position
Source: fisu.net

=== Leading goaltenders ===
Only the top seven goaltenders, based on save percentage, who have played at least 40% of their team's minutes, are included in this list.

Player	TOI	GA	GAA	SA	Sv%	SO
(Canada) Beth Clause	200:00	0	0.00	25	100.00	3
(Canada) Liz Knox	225:00	3	0.80	38	92.11	1
(Slovakia) Zuzana Tomčíková	307:23	13	2.54	147	91.16	0
(Finland) Anna Vanhatalo	305:00	8	1.57	87	90.80	1
(United Kingdom) Laura Saunders	244:00	22	5.41	156	85.90	0
(United States) Katie Vaughan	199:20	6	1.81	42	85.71	1
(United States) Heather Rossi	219:54	22	6.00	151	85.43	0

TOI = Time on Ice (minutes:seconds); SA = Shots against; GA = Goals against; GAA = Goals against average; Sv% = Save percentage; SO = Shutouts
Source: fisu.net

== Medalists ==
Event	Gold	Silver	Bronze
Men	Russia (RUS); 1 Evgeniy Orlov; 3 Sergei Zuborev (A); 4 Egor Yakovlev; 5 Maxim Sergeev; 9 Andrey Sergeev; 10 Anton Lazarev; 11 Sergey Salnikov (C); 12 Marat Valiullin; 13 Denis Golubev; 15 Rafael Akhmetov; 18 Ayrat Ziazov; 20 Vladimir Zhmaev; 23 Stanislav Golovanov; 28 Vasily Tokranov; 34 Evgeny Belukhin; 36 Sergei Belokon (A); 44 Vyacheslav Seluyanov; 52 Bulat Shavaleev; 57 Nikolai Lukyanchikov; 77 Emil Garipov; 81 Yaroslav Alshevskiy; 90 Alexander Sumin	Belarus (BLR); 3 Andrei Kolosov; 4 Evgeniy Nogachev; 5 Roman Alekseev; 7 Ihar Shvedau; 8 Alexander Pavlovich (A); 9 Ilya Shinkevich; 10 Pavel Razvadovski; 11 Mikhail Kharamanda; 12 Aliaksandr Kachan; 13 Alexander Kitarov (C); 14 Aliaksandr Siomachkin; 15 Artem Demkov; 16 Rustam Azimov; 17 Kiryl Brykun; 18 Ivan Miadzel; 19 Aleh Haroshka; 20 Stepan Goryachevskikh; 21 Mikalai Susla; 22 Yevgeni Khuzeyeu; 23 Ilya Kaznadey; 24 Dzmitry Shumski (A); 25 Vitali Belinski	Canada (CAN); 4 Matt Caria; 6 Scott Aarssen; 7 Marc-Andre Dorion; 8 Geoff Killing; 9 Kevin Baker; 10 Chris Ray (A); 11 Evan Vossen; 12 Dominic Jalbert; 14 Keaton Turkiewicz; 15 Tim Priamo; 16 Maxime Langelier-Parent; 17 Brandon MacLean (A); 19 Yashar Farmanara; 20 Jordan Smith (C); 21 Thomas Kiriakou; 22 Mathieu Methot; 25 Kyle Sonnenburg; 26 Francis Charland; 27 Jean-Michel Rizk; 28 Ryan Berard; 30 Jim Watt; 31 Anthony Grieco
Women	Canada (CAN); 2 Alicia Martin; 4 Candice Styles; 5 Jacalyn Sollis; 6 Kelsey Webster; 9 Kim Deschênes; 12 Andrea Boras; 13 Suzanne Fenerty; 14 Courtney Unruh; 15 Jessica Zerafa; 16 Andrea Ironside (C); 17 Breanne George; 18 Addie Miles; 19 Jocelyn Leblanc; 21 Ellie Seedhouse; 22 Jenna Downey; 23 Erin Lally; 24 Ann-Sophie Bettez; 25 Mariève Provost (A); 27 Carly Hill (A); 30 Beth Clause; 31 Liz Knox	Finland (FIN); 1 Anna Vanhatalo; 2 Hanna-Riikka Turpeinen; 5 Mari Alina Ahvensalmi; 7 Essi Hallvar (A); 9 Venla Hovi; 11 Annina Rajahuhta (A); 12 Krista Rahunen; 13 Jutta Stoltenberg; 15 Susanna Niemela; 20 Sari Karna; 21 Annukka Kinisjarvi; 22 Saara Tuominen (C); 24 Salla Korhonen; 25 Tiina Saarimaki; 26 Johanna Juutilainen; 27 Anne Helin; 28 Anne Tuomanen; 30 Linda Selkee	Slovakia (SVK); 1 Zuzana Tomcikova; 3 Veronika Kasperova; 4 Barbora Kezmarska; 5 Veronika Cernanova; 6 Katarina Bernatova; 7 Barbora Bremova; 8 Martina Staronova; 9 Katarina Vybostokova; 10 Jana Stofanikova; 11 Lenka Krajnakova; 12 Maria Herichova; 13 Petra Jurcova; 14 Anna Dzurnakova (C); 15 Slavomira Stofanikova; 17 Martina Velickova; 18 Janka Culikova (A); 19 Iveta Karafiatova; 20 Monika Kvakova; 21 Elena Buckova; 22 Nikola Gapova; 24 Petra Pravlikova (A)

== Medal table ==
Rank	Nation	Gold	Silver	Bronze	Total
1	Canada	1	0	1	2
2	Russia	1	0	0	1
3	Belarus	0	1	0	1
3	Finland	0	1	0	1
5	Slovakia	0	0	1	1
Totals (5 entries)		2	2	2	6
