= Verlič =

Verlič is a surname. Notable people with the surname include:

- Jure Verlič (born 1987), Slovenian footballer
- Miha Verlič (born 1991), Slovenian ice hockey player
