= GSIM (disambiguation) =

GSIM is Jama'at Nusrat al-Islam wal-Muslimin (French: Groupe de soutien à l'islam et aux musulmans), a Salafi Jihadist organisation in the Maghreb and West Africa.

GSIM may also refer to:

- GSİM (Youth and Sport Directorate of Erzurum Province), owners of:
  - Palandöken Ice Skating Hall, formerly GSIM Yenişehir Ice Hockey Hall, in Erzurum, Turkey
  - Erzurum GSIM Ice Arena, in Erzurum, Turkey
- Graduate School of International Management (GSIM), of the International University of Japan
