= Nikola Gápová =

Slovak ice hockey player

- Born: 19 June 1989 (age 37) Poprad, Czechoslovakia
- Height: 175 cm (5 ft 9 in)
- Weight: 60 kg (132 lb; 9 st 6 lb)
- Position: Wing
- Shot: Left
- Played for: Espoo Blues; SK Karviná; ZHK Poprad; HC Slovan Bratislava
- National team: Slovakia
- Playing career: 2005–2018
Medal record
Representing Slovakia
Women's ice hockey
Universiade
Bronze medal – third place	2011 Turkey

Nikola Gápová (born 19 June 1989) is a Slovak retired ice hockey forward.

== International career ==
Gápová was selected for the Slovakia national women's ice hockey team in the 2010 Winter Olympics. She played in all five games, but did not score a point. She played all three games of the qualifying campaigns for the 2010 and 2014 Olympics.

Gápová has also appeared for Slovakia at five IIHF Women's World Championships, across three levels. Her first appearance came in 2007. She appeared at the top level championships in 2011 and 2012.

== Career statistics ==
=== International career ===
Year	Team	Event	GP	G	A	Pts	PIM
2007	Slovakia	WW DII	5	0	0	0	0
2008	Slovakia	WW DI	5	0	0	0	4
2008	Slovakia	OlyQ	3	0	0	0	0
2010	Slovakia	Oly	5	0	0	0	0
2011	Slovakia	WW	5	0	1	1	0
2012	Slovakia	WW	5	0	0	0	0
2013	Slovakia	OlyQ	3	0	0	0	0
2013	Slovakia	WW DIA	5	1	0	1	2
