= Jutta Stoltenberg =

Finnish ice hockey player (born 1991)

- Born: 7 September 1991 (age 35) Hamburg, Germany
- Height: 1.72 m (5 ft 8 in)
- Weight: 55 kg (121 lb; 8 st 9 lb)
- Position: Defense
- Shot: Left
- Played for: HPK Hämeenlinna
- Coached for: HPK U20; Finland Selects U14
- National team: Finland
- Playing career: 2008–2026
- Coaching career: 2012–present
Medal record
Universiade
Silver medal – second place	2011 Erzurum	Ice hockey
Bronze medal – third place	2009 Harbin	Ice hockey

Jutta Stoltenberg (born 7 September 1991) is a Finnish retired ice hockey player. The entirety of her eighteen-season club career was spent with HPK Hämeenlinna in the Auroraliiga. She is the record holder for games played with HPK and also ranks third in all-time league statistics for regular season games played (490). Her career with HPK was highlighted by an Aurora Borealis Cup victory in 2011 and a European Champions Cup victory in 2012; she was also a two-time Universiade medalist for Finland.

== Playing career ==
Stoltenberg's ice hockey club career began in 2008 with HPK Kiekkonaiset ('HPK Puck-women'), the women's representative ice hockey team of the sports club Hämeenlinnan Pallokerho (HPK) in Hämeenlinna. She holds the record for most games played with HPK (with over 100 more appearances than the second-ranked player) and is second on the list of all-time points scored for the club.

Medal record

HPK Hämeenlinna

European Champions Cup
Bronze medal – third place	2012 Hämeenlinna	

With HPK, Stoltenberg won the inaugural Aurora Borealis Cup in 2011. As the reigning Finnish Champion, HPK earned a berth in the second round of the 2011–12 IIHF European Women Champions Cup. Stoltenberg and Riikka Noronen served as HPK alternate captains during the tournament and, after sweeping their group in the second round, the team went on to win bronze in the tournament final. During the final, Stoltenberg ranked among the top-ten defensemen of the tournament in scoring.

In addition to the 2011 Aurora Borealis Cup, she won Finnish Championship silver in 2016, 2025, and 2026, and Finnish Championship bronze in 2009, 2010, 2012, and 2014.

She served as captain of HPK Kiekkonaiset during the 2017–18 and 2018–19 seasons, and as an alternate captain in the 2016–17 and 2019–20 seasons.

Stoltenberg recorded her 400th regular season game in the Naisten Liiga at the end of the 2022–23 season, becoming the seventh player and third defenseman to reach the milestone in league history. At the time of her retirement, she ranked first for most regular season games played by a defenseman in Auroraliiga history (Note: Stoltenberg played the first seventeen seasons of her career as a defenseman, but switched to forward for the 2025–26 Auroraliiga season. She played 490 regular season games in total and 462 game as a defenseman, both of which exceed the number of games played by the next ranking defender.) and third of all players.

Stoltenberg announced her retirement from playing in May 2026, citing a desire to focus on her educational and occupational pursuits. She expressed an interest in exploring coaching opportunities in the future.

== International play ==
As a youth player with the Finnish national under-18 team, Stoltenberg competed at the IIHF U18 Women's World Championship in 2008 and 2009.

She is a two-time medalist for Finland at the Universiade (renamed FISU World University Games in 2020). Her first appearance at the Universiade was the women's ice hockey tournament at Harbin 2009, where she contributed two goals and two assists in seven games to Finland's bronze medal performance. She doubled her points output in the women's ice hockey tournament at 2011 Erzurum, tallying three goals and five assists for eight points in six games to lead all Finnish defenders in points; her effort helped Finland claim silver in the tournament.
