= 2012 IIHF World Championship Division III =

International ice hockey tournament

Tournament details
- Host country: Turkey
- Venue(s): 1 (in 1 host city)
- Dates: 15 – 21 April
- Teams: 6

The 2012 IIHF World Championship Division III was an international Ice hockey tournament run by the International Ice Hockey Federation. It was contested in Erzurum, Turkey running from April 15–21, 2012.

== Participants ==
Team	Qualification
North Korea	Placed 6th in Division II Group A and was relegated in 2011.
Ireland	Placed 6th in Division II Group B and was relegated in 2011.
Turkey	Host, placed 3rd in Division III last year.
Luxembourg	Placed 4th in Division III last year.
Greece^	Placed 5th in Division III last year.
Mongolia^	Placed 6th in Division III last year.

^ – Both Bosnia and Herzegovina and Chinese Taipei applied to participate in the Division III tournament, but the IIHF did not approve either, so Greece and Mongolia joined the other four teams for the Division III tournament.

== Tournament ==
=== Standings ===
Promoted to Division II B for 2013
Relegated to Division III qualification for 2013

Team	GP	W	OTW	OTL	L	GF	GA	GDF	PTS
Turkey	5	5	0	0	0	33	7	+26	15
North Korea	5	4	0	0	1	27	8	+19	12
Luxembourg	5	3	0	0	2	20	15	+5	9
Ireland	5	2	0	0	3	18	24	−6	6
Greece	5	1	0	0	4	9	22	−13	3
Mongolia	5	0	0	0	5	8	39	−31	0

All times are local (UTC+3).

15 April 2012; 13:00	Greece	1–6 (1–1, 0–3, 0–2)	Turkey	GSIM Ice Arena, Erzurum; Attendance: 500

Game reference

Ntalimpor Ploutsis
Goalies
Levent Ozbaydugan
Referee:
(Ukraine) Dmitry Kravchenko
Linesmen:
(United Kingdom) James Kavanagh
(Lithuania) Vladislovas Rudzinskas

	0–1	10:47 – S. Semiz (G. Çetinkaya) (PP)
I. Pachos (E. Fournogerakis, A. Valsamas-Rallis) – 12:20	1–1
	1–2	27:07 – S. Semiz (G. Çetinkaya, Y. Halil)
	1–3	32:57 – S. Semiz (Y. Halil, E. Ozmen)
	1–4	38:18 – A. Solak
	1–5	50:11 – A. Solak (Y. Halil, E. Ozmen)
	1–6	52:47 – A. Solak (Y. Halil, E. Ozmen) (PP)

26 min
Penalties
20 min
26
Shots
51

15 April 2012; 17:00	Luxembourg	7–2 (4–1, 2–0, 1–1)	Ireland	GSIM Ice Arena, Erzurum; Attendance: 120

Game reference

Gilles Mangen
Goalies
Adam Pepper
Referee:
(Croatia) Vedran Krcelic
Linesmen:
(Turkey) Erhan Bulut
(Croatia) Marko Sakovic

	0–1	01:59 – A. Jackson-Wyatt (G. Roberts)
R. Beran (R. Scheier) – 02:59	1–1
B. Houdremont (R. Beran) – 14:32	2–1
C. Mossong (S. Backes) – 16:06	3–1
B. Welter (R. Beran) (SH) – 18:24	4–1
B. Schneider (PP) – 27:19	5–1
B. Schneider (T. Beran) – 35:55	6–1
	6–2	55:16 – A. Jackson-Wyatt (G. Martin) (PP)
B. Houdremont (R. Beran) – 56:38	7–2

14 min
Penalties
16 min
44
Shots
20

15 April 2012; 21:00	Mongolia	2–12 (1–2, 1–3, 0–7)	North Korea	GSIM Ice Arena, Erzurum; Attendance: 22

Game reference

Munkhbold Bayarsaikhan
Ulambayar Narmandakh
Goalies
Pak Kun-Hyok
Pak Kuk-Chol
Referee:
(Romania) Marius Iliescu
Linesmen:
(Turkey) Cemalersin Kaya
(Bulgaria) Todor Krastev

	0–1	02:18 – Ri P. (Ju S.)
E. Altansan (PP) – 10:00	1–1
	1–2	11:11 – Ri C.
	1–3	21:54 – Om S. (Hong C., Pak S.)
	1–4	23:50 – Kim M. (Ku S.)
	1–5	29:49 – Ju S. (Ri P.) (SH)
M. Enkhtur (B. Jargalsaikhan, T. Ganbold) – 39:31	2–5
	2–6	47:11 – Ri P. (SH)
	2–7	48:49 – Jong S. (Ri S., Kim J.) (SH)
	2–8	49:47 – Ri C. (Kim J.) (PP)
	2–9	52:06 – Kim J. (Kim J.)
	2–10	52:25 – Kim J. (Jong S.)
	2–11	57:27 – Jong S. (Ri C., Kim J.) (SH)
	2–12	58:18 – Kim C.

16 min
Penalties
14 min
10
Shots
48

16 April 2012; 13:00	Ireland	5–3 (2–0, 2–1, 1–2)	Greece	GSIM Ice Arena, Erzurum; Attendance: 178

Game reference

Scott Bickerstaff
Goalies
Ntalimpor Ploutsis
Referee:
(Romania) Marius Iliescu
Linesmen:
(Turkey) Erhan Bulut
(Turkey) Cemalersin Kaya

G. Martin (A. Jackson-Wyatt, G. Roberts) – 03:01	1–0
G. Roberts (D. Morrison) (PP) – 13:57	2–0
S. Hamill (A. Patience) (PP) – 21:09	3–0
S. Ewen (S. Adams, T. O'Driscoll) (PP) – 34:37	4–0
	4–1	38:05 – A. Valsamas-Rallis (SH)
	4–2	42:55 – D. Kalyvas (L. Efkarpidis)
	4–3	50:45 – D. Kalyvas (O. Tilios) (PP2)
A. Jackson-Wyatt (G. Roberts) (PP2) – 55:20	5–3

44 min
Penalties
52 min
37
Shots
27

16 April 2012; 17:00	North Korea	4–1 (0–1, 3–0, 1–0)	Luxembourg	GSIM Ice Arena, Erzurum; Attendance: 132

Game reference

Pak Kun-Hyok
Goalies
Gilles Mangen
Referee:
(Poland) Wlodzimierc Marczuk
Linesmen:
(United Kingdom) James Kavanagh
(Lithuania) Vladislovas Rudzinskas

	0–1	05:40 – B. Welter (R. Beran, B. Houdremont)
Ri K. (Pak S.) – 21:55	1–1
Ri K. (Kim K., Kim M.) – 28:18	2–1
Kim K. (Ri P.) (EA) – 39:46	3–1
Kim K. (Ri P.) (SH) – 51:00	4–1

14 min
Penalties
12 min
26
Shots
12

16 April 2012; 21:00	Turkey	10–0 (4–0, 2–0, 4–0)	Mongolia	GSIM Ice Arena, Erzurum; Attendance: 254

Game reference

Fikri Atali
Goalies
Munkhbold Bayarsikhan
Referee:
(Croatia) Vedran Krcelic
Linesmen:
(France) Matthieu Barbez
(Bulgaria) Todor Krastev

E. Coşkun (A. Solak) – 03:29	1–0
S. Aktürk – 12:10	2–0
E. Coskun (S. Gumus) – 12:20	3–0
G. Çetinkaya (S. Gumus, S. Aktürk) (PP2) – 17:56	4–0
G. Tasdemir (G. Hamarat, G. Solak) (PP) – 21:01	5–0
E. Ozmen (E. Coşkun, G. Çetinkaya) – 21:53	6–0
E. Ozmen (S. Aktürk) (SH) – 42:46	7–0
G. Solak (O. Yavuzarslan) (PP) – 48:27	8–0
S. Semiz (C. Abayli, E. Ozmen) – 53:46	9–0
S. Semiz (E. Ozmen) – 58:33	10–0

16 min
Penalties
12 min
53
Shots
14

18 April 2012; 13:00	North Korea	4–1 (0–0, 2–0, 2–1)	Greece	GSIM Ice Arena, Erzurum; Attendance: 43

Game reference

Pak Kun-Hyok
Pak Kuk-Choi
Goalies
Georgios Fiotakis
Referee:
(Croatia) Vedran Krcelic
Linesmen:
(France) Matthieu Barbez
(Croatia) Marko Sakovic

Kim J. (Ri S. – 24:58	1–0
Pak S. (Hong C., Om S.) – 32:55	2–0
	2–1	51:27 I. Koufis (N. Papadopoulos, D. Kalyvas) (PP2)
Om S. (Jong S.) – 56:34	3–1
Kim K. (Kim N.) – 57:33	4–1

16 min
Penalties
10 min
45
Shots
11

18 April 2012; 17:00	Ireland	3–5 (0–1, 3–2, 0–2)	Turkey	GSIM Ice Arena, Erzurum; Attendance: 216

Game reference

Scott Bickerstaff
Goalies
Levent Ozbaydugan
Referee:
(Poland) Wlodzimierc Marczuk
Linesmen:
(United Kingdom) James Kavanagh
(Lithuania) Vladislovas Rudzinskas

	0–1	17:12 – S. Semiz (G. Hamarat) (PP)
G. Roberts (S. Adams) (PP2) – 21:08	1–1
	1–2	37:01 – Y. Halil (G. Tasdemir) (SH)
G. Roberts (D. Kelly, G. Martin) (PP2) – 37:31	2–2
G. Roberts (D. Kelly) – 39:05	3–2
	3–3	39:55 – S. Gümüş (A. Solak, G. Çetinkaya) (PP)
	3–4	53:26 – G. Tasdemir (E. Ozmen, S. Semiz) (SH)
	3–5	54:47 – S. Aktürk (S. Gümüş)

12 min
Penalties
18 min
26
Shots
29

18 April 2012; 21:00	Mongolia	1–5 (1–4, 0–1, 0–0)	Luxembourg	GSIM Ice Arena, Erzurum; Attendance: 55

Game reference

Munkhbold Bayarsaikhan
Goalies
Philippe Lepage
Referee:
(Ukraine) Dmitry Kravchenko
Linesmen:
(Turkey) Erhan Bulut
(Bulgaria) Todor Krastev

	0–1	03:16 – R. Beran (B. Welter, B. Houdremont)
	0–2	06:57 – E. Wambach (T. Beran)
	0–3	09:07 – T. Beran (PP)
N. Ganbat (B. Enkhjargal) – 16:00	1–3
	1–4	16:35 – R. Beran (B. Welter)
	1–5	27:34 – S. Milano (PP)

62 min
Penalties
43 min
32
Shots
38

19 April 2012; 13:00	Turkey	4–2 (0–0, 3–2, 1–0)	North Korea	GSIM Ice Arena, Erzurum; Attendance: 102

Game reference

Fikri Atali
Goalies
Pak Kun-Hyok
Referee:
(Romania) Marius Iliescu
Linesmen:
(United Kingdom) James Kavanagh
(Croatia) Marko Sakovic

A. Solak (G. Çetinkaya) – 22:42	1–0
G. Hamarat (C. Baykan, G. Tasdemir) (PP) – 26:35	2–0
	2–1	27:12 – Ri C. (Kim J.)
E. Coşkun (A. Solak) (PP) – 32:55	3–1
	3–2	36:56 – Ju S. (Ku S.) (PP)
Y. Halil (E. Coşkun) – 55:41	4–2

32 min
Penalties
20 min
25
Shots
33

19 April 2012; 17:00	Luxembourg	6–0 (1–0, 4–0, 1–0)	Greece	GSIM Ice Arena, Erzurum; Attendance: 47

Game reference

Philippe Lepage
Goalies
Ntalimpor Ploutsis
Georgios Fiotakis
Referee:
(Poland) Wlodzimierc Marczuk
Linesmen:
(Bulgaria) Todor Krastev
(Lithuania) Vladislovas Rudzinskas

B. Schneider (P. Schon) (PP) – 11:31	1–0
E. Wambach (C. Mossong) – 21:44	2–0
T. Beran (R. Beran, E. Wambach) – 28:21	3–0
B. Welter (S. Backes, R. Beran) (PP) – 29:13	4–0
B. Schneider (S. Milano, P. Schon) (PP) – 30:47	5–0
T. Beran (E. Wambach) – 45:35	6–0

12 min
Penalties
51 min
42
Shots
22

19 April 2012; 21:00	Ireland	8–4 (2–0, 2–1, 4–3)	Mongolia	GSIM Ice Arena, Erzurum; Attendance: 31

Game reference

Adam Pepper
Goalies
Munkhbold Bayarsaikhan
Referee:
(Ukraine) Dmitry Kravchenko
Linesmen:
(France) Matthieu Barbez
(Turkey) Cemalersin Kaya

G. Roberts (SH) – 03:00	1–0
P. Catherwood (A. Patience) – 04:14	2–0
	2–1	29:26 – N. Ganbat
G. Martin (A. Jackson-Wyatt, G. Roberts) – 30:14	3–1
S. Adams (G. Roberts) (PP2) – 36:57	4–1
G. Martin (G. Roberts) – 40:16	5–1
	5–2	45:02 – M. Namjil
S. Hamill (G. Martin, G. Roberts) (PP) – 47:52	6–2
G. Roberts (S. Hamill) – 49:05	7–2
	7–3	54:09 – Batzayaagiin Pürevdorj
	7–4	56:16 – G-O. Tseveen (PS)
G. Roberts – 59:59	8–4

26 min
Penalties
12 min
50
Shots
15

21 April 2012; 13:00	Greece	4–1 (1–0, 1–1, 2–0)	Mongolia	GSIM Ice Arena, Erzurum; Attendance: 48

Game reference

Ntalimpor Ploutsis
Goalies
Munkhbold Bayarsaikhan
Referee:
(Romania) Marius Iliescu
Linesmen:
(Turkey) Erhan Bulut
(Turkey) Cemalersin Kaya

I. Koufis (O. Tilios) (SH) – 05:51	1–0
A. Valsamas-Rallis (D. Kalyvas) – 36:37	2–0
	2–1	38:16 – T. Ganbold (B. Jargalsaikhan)
O. Tilios (D. Kalyvas) (PP) – 41:40	3–1
D. Kalyvas – 57:23	4–1

36 min
Penalties
37 min
40
Shots
14

21 April 2012; 17:00	Turkey	8–1 (1–0, 4–0, 3–1)	Luxembourg	GSIM Ice Arena, Erzurum; Attendance: 451

Game reference

Fikri Atali
Goalies
Gilles Mangen
Referee:
(Croatia) Vedran Krcelic
Linesmen:
(France) Matthieu Barbez
(United Kingdom) James Kavanagh

E. Ozmen – 14:45	1–0
E. Ozmen (S. Gumus) – 21:35	2–0
Y. Halil (S. Semiz, G. Tasdemir) – 26:25	3–0
C. Baykan (O. Yavuzarslan, G. Solak) – 30:58	4–0
E. Ozmen (Y. Halil, G. Hamarat) – 31:28	5–0
	5–1	43:02 R. Beran (R. Scheier) (PP)
S. Gumus (E. Coskun, G. Çetinkaya) – 51:08	6–1
B. Kosemen (G. Solak) – 53:29	7–1
Y. Halil (S. Semiz) – 56:46	8–1

10 min
Penalties
4 min
47
Shots
26

21 April 2012; 21:00	North Korea	5–0 (2–0, 0–0, 3–0)	Ireland	GSIM Ice Arena, Erzurum; Attendance: 102

Game reference

Pak Kun-Hyok
Pak Kuk-Chol
Goalies
Scott Bickerstaff
Referee:
(Poland) Wlodzimierc Marczuk
Linesmen:
(Lithuania) Vladislovas Rudzinskas
(Croatia) Marko Sakovic

Kim J. (Ri C.) (PP) – 06:19	1–0
Ri C. – 18:21	2–0
Ju S. (Kim M., Ri P.) – 42:59	3–0
Kim K. (Kim M., Ri P.) – 45:26	4–0
Hong C. (Om S., Pak S.) – 46:35	5–0

10 min
Penalties
16 min
46
Shots
10
