= Evgeny Belukhin =

Russian-Ukrainian ice hockey player

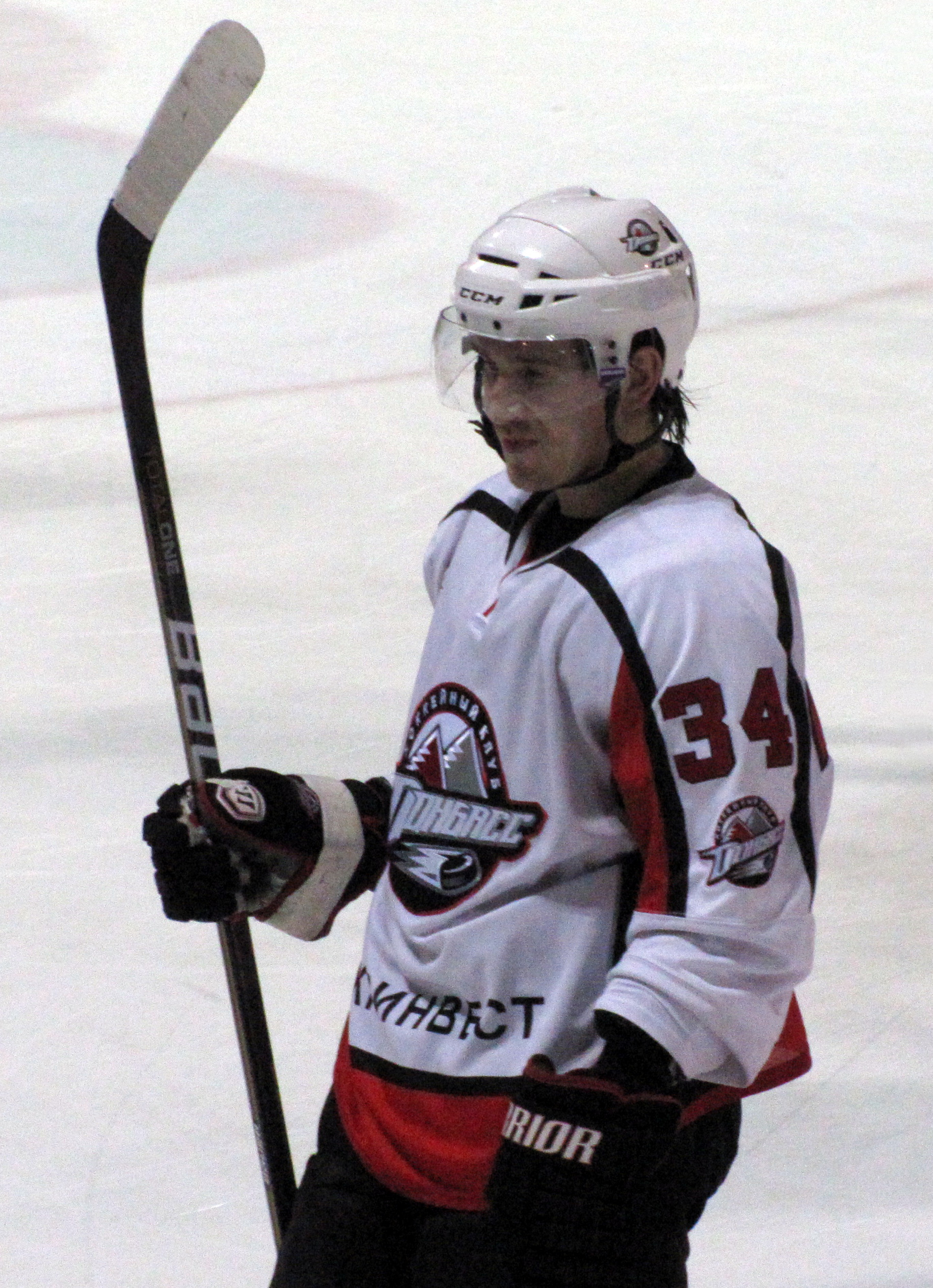
- Belukhin with HC Donbass in 2012
- Born: August 20, 1983 (age 43) Sarov, Russian SFSR, Soviet Union
- Height: 1.80 m (5 ft 11 in)
- Weight: 79 kg (174 lb; 12 st 6 lb)
- Position: Forward
- Shot: Left
- Played for: HC Donbass; Shakhter Soligorsk; Torpedo Nizhny Novgorod; Metallurg Novokuznetsk; HC Lada Togliatti
- National team: Ukraine and Russia
- NHL draft: Undrafted
- Playing career: 2003–2020
Medal record
Representing Russia
Universiade
Gold medal – first place	2009 Harbin	Ice hockey
Gold medal – first place	2011 Erzurum	Ice hockey

Evgeny Nikolayevich Belukhin (Ukrainian: Євген Миколайович Бєлухін, Russian: Евгений Николаевич Белухин; born August 20, 1983, in Sarov) is a Soviet-born Russian-Ukrainian retired professional ice hockey forward. He last played with HC Donbass in the 2019–20 season of the Ukrainian Hockey League (UHL).

Belukin made his Kontinental Hockey League debut with HC Lada Togliatti during the 2009–10 KHL season.
