= Ondrej Zošiak =

Slovak ice hockey player

- Born: December 9, 1990 (age 34)
- Position: Defence
- NIHL team: Invicta Dynamos
- Playing career: 2010–present

Ondrej Zošiak (born December 9, 1990) is a Slovak professional ice hockey defenceman who is currently playing for the Invicta Dynamos in the National Ice Hockey League.
