= Vyacheslav Seluyanov =

Russian ice hockey player (born 1986)

- Born: December 15, 1986 (age 38); Ufa, Russian SFSR, Soviet Union
- Height: 5 ft 9 in (175 cm)
- Weight: 205 lb (93 kg; 14 st 9 lb)
- Position: Defence
- Shoots: Right
- Kazakh team Former teams: Gornyak Rudny; Salavat Yulaev Ufa; HC Lada Togliatti; Avtomobilist Yekaterinburg; Yertis Pavlodar; Beibarys Atyrau
- Playing career: 2004–present

Vyacheslav Seluyanov (born December 15, 1986) is a Russian professional ice hockey defenceman currently playing for Gornyak Rudny of the Kazakhstan Hockey Championship. He is the younger brother of Alexander Seluyanov.

Seluyanov previously played in the Russian Superleague and Kontinental Hockey League for Salavat Yulaev Ufa, HC Lada Togliatti and Avtomobilist Yekaterinburg.
