= Anton Lazarev =

Russian ice hockey player

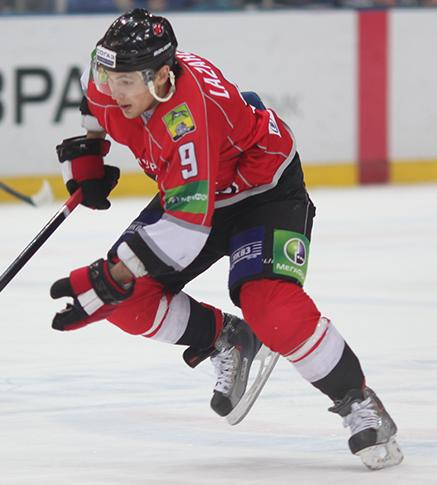
- Born: May 29, 1990 (age 34); Chelyabinsk, Russian SFSR
- Height: 5 ft 11 in (180 cm)
- Weight: 176 lb (80 kg; 12 st 8 lb)
- Position: Left wing
- Shoots: Left
- KHL team Former teams: Kunlun Red Star; Atlant Moscow Oblast; Metallurg Novokuznetsk; Avtomobilist Yekaterinburg; Salavat Yulaev Ufa; HC Vityaz; Amur Khabarovsk; Traktor Chelyabinsk
- Playing career: 2006–present

Anton Lazarev (born May 29, 1990) is a Russian professional ice hockey forward currently playing with HC Kunlun Red Star in the Kontinental Hockey League (KHL). Lazarev previously signed a two-year contract with Avtomobilist Yekaterinburg after two seasons with Metallurg Novokuznetsk on May 8, 2013.

During the 2020–21 season, Lazarev registered 1 goal in 10 games with Traktor Chelyabinsk before he was released from his contract. On 14 December 2020, Lazarev continued in the KHL, agreeing to a contract for the remainder of the season with HC Kunlun Red Star.

== Career statistics ==
=== International ===
Year	Team	Event	Result	GP	G	A	Pts	PIM
2007	Russia	IH18	3rd place, bronze medalist(s)	4	0	2	2	6
2008	Russia	WJC18	2nd place, silver medalist(s)	6	3	4	7	6
Junior totals				10	3	6	9	12
