= Ilya Kaznadey =

Belarusian ice hockey player

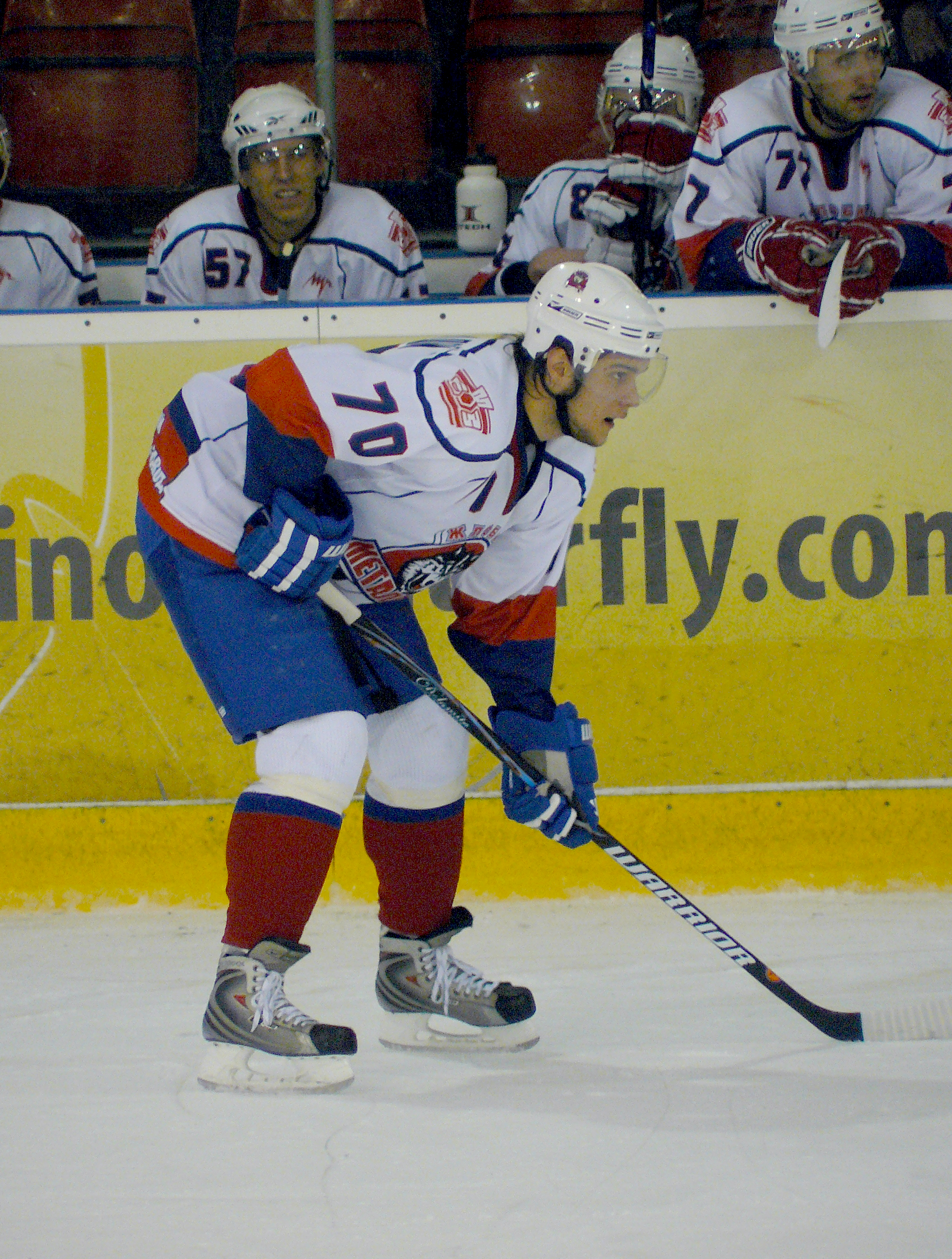
- Ilya Kaznadey
- Born: June 22, 1989 (age 36); Minsk, Belarus
- Height: 5 ft 11 in (180 cm)
- Weight: 207 lb (94 kg; 14 st 11 lb)
- Position: Defense
- Shot: Left
- Played for: Metallurg Zhlobin (BXL); HC Dinamo Minsk (KHL); HK Neman Grodno
- National team: Belarus
- Playing career: 2008–2023

Ilya Kaznadey (born June 22, 1989) is a Belarusian ice hockey player who is currently playing for HK Neman Grodno of the (BXL).

Kaznadey competed in the 2013 IIHF World Championship as a member of the Belarus men's national ice hockey team.

== Career statistics ==
			Regular season					Playoffs
Season	Team	League	GP	G	A	Pts	PIM	GP	G	A	Pts	PIM
2006–07	Yunior Minsk	Belarus Vysshaya	8	1	1	2	14	—	—	—	—	—
2007–08	Metallurg Zhlobin-2	Belarus Vysshaya	43	3	5	8	131	—	—	—	—	—
2008–09	Shinnik Bobruisk	Belarus	1	0	0	0	2	—	—	—	—	—
2008–09	Metallurg Zhlobin	Belarus	25	0	3	3	24	7	0	0	0	0
2008–09	Metallurg Zhlobin-2	Belarus Vysshaya	14	1	5	6	47	—	—	—	—	—
2009–10	Metallurg Zhlobin	Belarus	8	0	0	0	6	—	—	—	—	—
2009–10	Metallurg Zhlobin-2	Belarus Vysshaya	30	7	17	24	108	—	—	—	—	—
2010–11	Metallurg Zhlobin	Belarus	33	2	3	5	68	5	0	0	0	2
2010–11	Metallurg Zhlobin-2	Belarus Vysshaya	8	3	2	5	43	—	—	—	—	—
2011–12	Metallurg Zhlobin	Belarus	27	7	9	16	41	14	5	4	9	16
2012–13	Metallurg Zhlobin	Belarus	39	7	14	21	40	11	0	1	1	6
2013–14	HC Dinamo Minsk	KHL	38	2	1	3	53	—	—	—	—	—
2014–15	HC Dinamo Minsk	KHL	19	0	0	0	16	4	0	0	0	2
2014–15	Dinamo-Molodechno	Belarus	24	6	5	11	63	—	—	—	—	—
2015–16	HK Neman Grodno	Belarus	28	4	5	9	98	10	2	1	3	18
2016–17	HK Neman Grodno	Belarus	29	1	7	8	14	11	0	1	1	6
2017–18	GKS Tychy	Poland	32	9	6	15	26	4	1	0	1	2
2018–19	Dinamo-Molodechno	Belarus	41	6	12	18	80	13	0	4	4	12
2019–20	HC Shakhtyor Soligorsk	Belarus	38	14	10	24	68	16	4	6	10	16
2020–21	HC Shakhtyor Soligorsk	Belarus	35	10	7	17	46	—	—	—	—	—
2021–22	HC Shakhtyor Soligorsk	Belarus	48	6	7	13	62	9	1	0	1	56
2022–23	Dinamo-Molodechno	Belarus	25	2	8	10	24	6	0	0	0	10
KHL totals			57	2	1	3	69	4	0	0	0	2
Belarus totals			401	65	90	155	636	102	12	17	29	142
