= Emil Garipov =

Russian ice hockey player (born 1991)

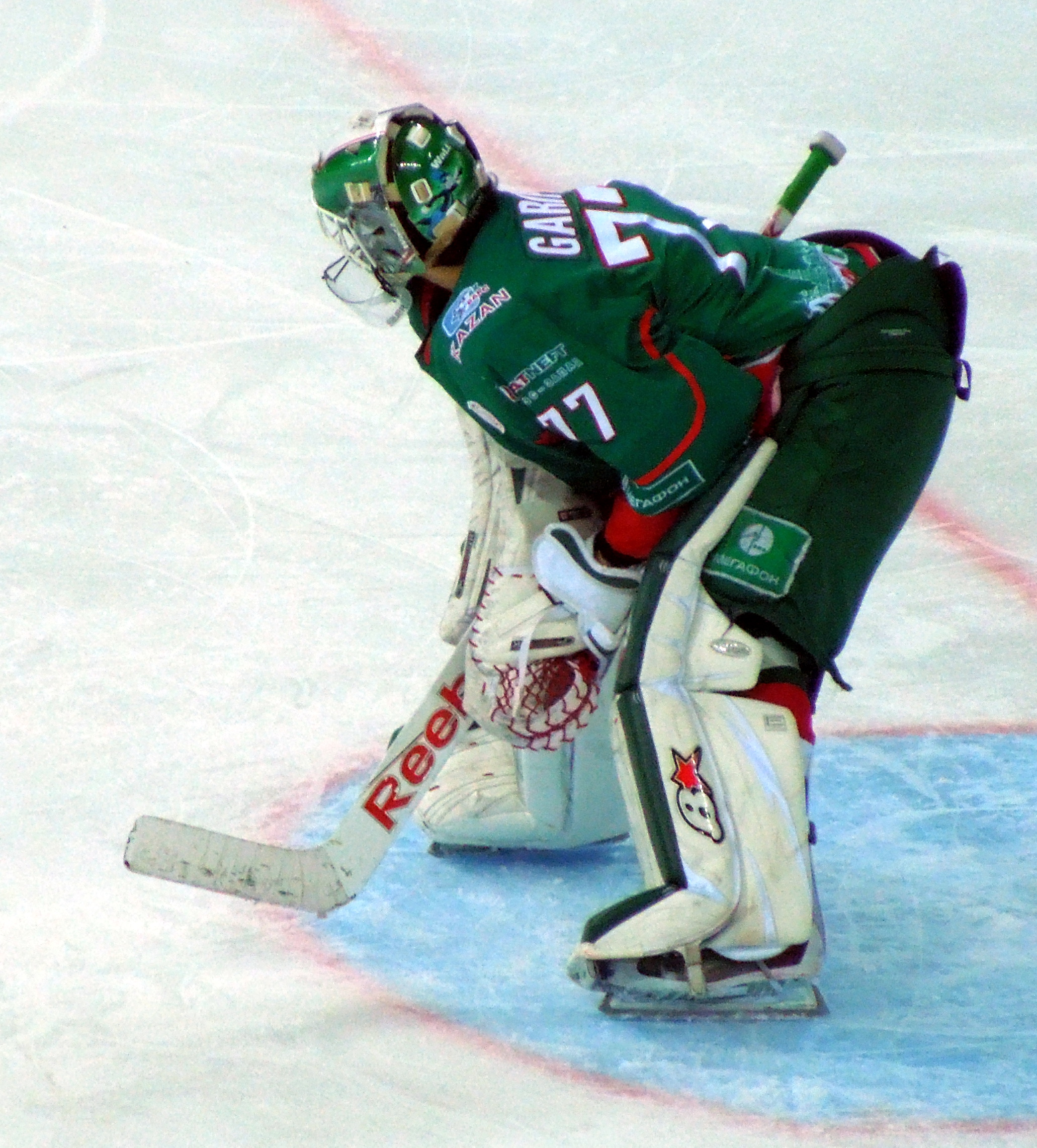
- Garipov with Ak Bars Kazan in 2015
- Born: August 15, 1991 (age 34) Kazan, Tatar ASSR, Russian SFSR, Soviet Union
- Height: 6 ft 2 in (188 cm)
- Weight: 196 lb (89 kg; 14 st 0 lb)
- Position: Goaltender
- Caught: Left
- KHL team Former teams: Free Agent; Ak Bars Kazan; Avangard Omsk; Dynamo Moscow; Traktor Chelyabinsk; Neftekhimik Nizhnekamsk
- Playing career: 2009–2024

Emil Garipov (Tatar: Эмиль Гарипов, born August 15, 1991) is a Russian former professional ice hockey goaltender. He most recently played with Neftekhimik Nizhnekamsk in the Kontinental Hockey League (KHL).

Garipov made his KHL debut with Ak Bars Kazan during the 2011–12 season.

== Awards and honours ==
Award	Year
KHL
Best GAA (1.43)	2014
Best SVS% (.952)	2014
All-Star Game	2018
Gagarin Cup (Ak Bars Kazan)	2018
