= Holly Cornford =

British ice hockey player (born 1992)

Holly Cornford (born 22 September 1992) plays for the Great Britain women's national ice hockey team as defenseman. She is the captain of the Kingston Diamonds.

== Career ==
Cornford won a silver medal in 2014/15, a bronze medal in 2015/16, and a silver medal in 2017/18.
