= Luka Bašič =

Slovenian ice hockey player

- Born: October 7, 1989 (age 35); Ljubljana, Slovenia
- Height: 5 ft 11 in (180 cm)
- Weight: 176 lb (80 kg; 12 st 8 lb)
- Position: Right wing
- Shot: Right
- Played for: HK Olimpija; HDD Olimpija Ljubljana; Gothiques d'Amiens; HC Astana; Bisons de Neuilly-sur-Marne; Bracknell Bees; HC Nove Zamky; HK Michalovce; HDD Jesenice
- National team: Slovenia
- Playing career: 2005–2019

Luka Bašič (born October 7, 1989) is a retired Slovenian ice hockey player who last played for HDD Jesenice of the Alps Hockey League.

Bašič competed in the 2013 IIHF World Championship as a member of the Slovenia men's national ice hockey team.
