= Erzurum GSIM Ice Arena =

Ice hockey arena in Turkey

Erzurum Ice Hockey Arena
- Interactive map of Erzurum Ice Hockey Arena
- Full name: Erzurum Buz Hokeyi Salonu
- Location: Yakutiye Spor Kampüsü, Aziziye yolu, Yakutiye, Erzurum, Turkey
- Coordinates: 39.904319°N 41.267885°E
- Owner: Erzurum Youth and Sport Directorate (GSİM)
- Capacity: 3,000 and 500

Construction
- Opened: 2009

Tenant
- Erzurum Gençlik S.K.

Website
- www.erzurum.gsb.gov.tr

Erzurum GSIM Ice Arena (Turkish: Erzurum GSİM Buz Salonu), is an indoor ice hockey arena located at Yakutiye district of Erzurum, eastern Turkey. It was opened in 2009.

The arena complex, owned by the Youth and Sport Directorate of Erzurum Province (GSİM), consists of two Olympic-size rinks in two buildings constructed side by side. The bigger venue has a seating capacity for 3,000 people while the smaller hall holds 500 spectators. 3000-seat hall hosts the men's ice hockey team of the Erzurum Gençlik SK and the 500-seat hall the women's team. Both teams play in the Turkish Ice Hockey Super League and the Turkish Ice Hockey Women's League respectively.

== International events hosted ==
- 25th Winter Universiade – Ice hockey – January 27 – February 6, 2011
- 11th IIHF World Championship Division III – April 15–21, 2012
- 2017 European Youth Olympic Winter Festival – February 12–17, 2017

== See also ==
- GSIM Yenişehir Ice Hockey Hall
