= Denis Golubev =

Russian ice hockey player

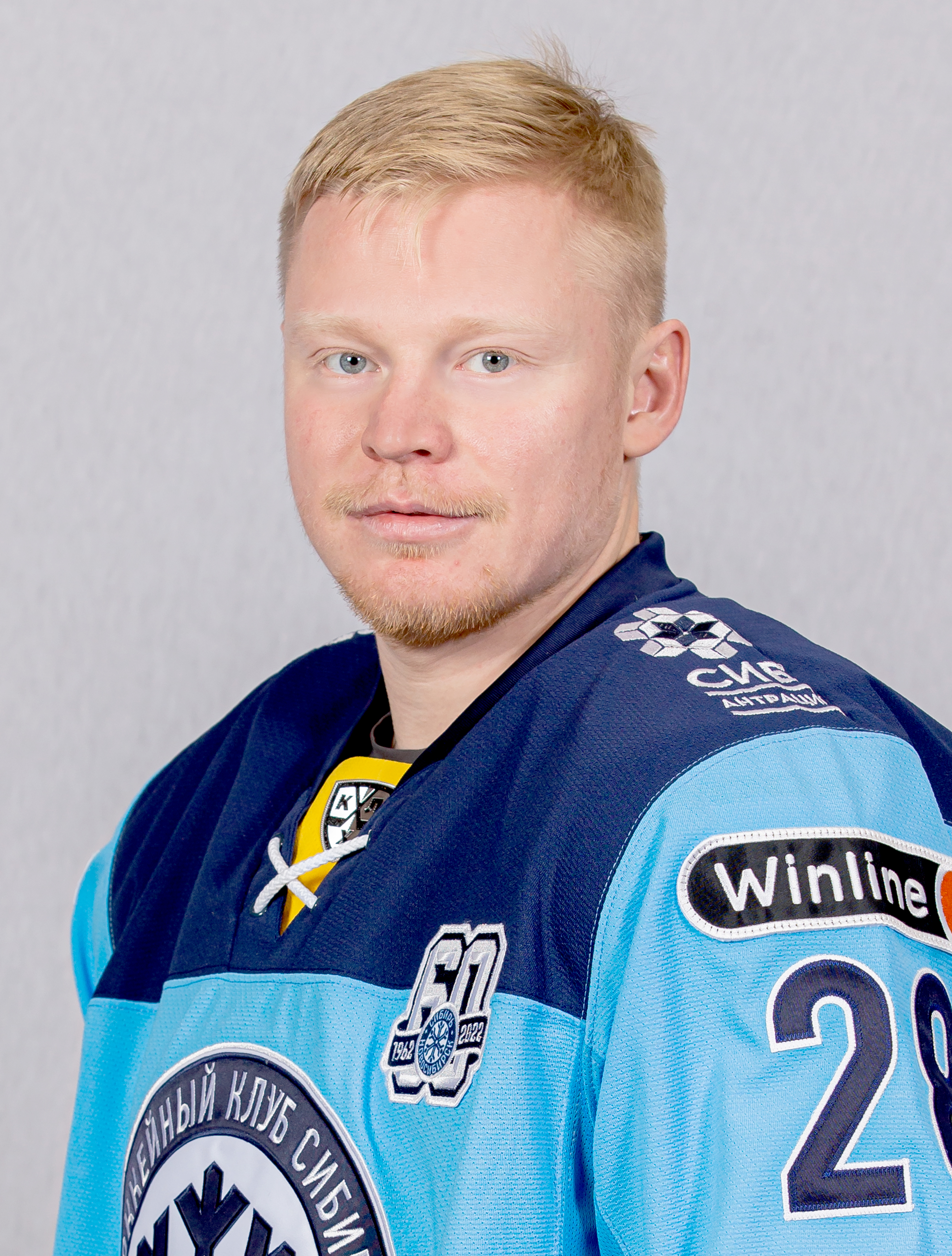
- Born: July 11, 1991 (age 34) Magnitogorsk, Russian SFSR, Soviet Union
- Height: 5 ft 11 in (180 cm)
- Weight: 194 lb (88 kg; 13 st 12 lb)
- Position: Centre
- Shoots: Right
- KHL team Former teams: Free agent Ak Bars Kazan; Lada Togliatti; Amur Khabarovsk; Sibir Novosibirsk; Admiral Vladivostok
- Playing career: 2009–present

Denis Golubev (born July 11, 1991) is a Russian professional ice hockey player who currently an unrestricted free agent. He most recently played for Admiral Vladivostok of the Kontinental Hockey League (KHL).

Medal record

Representing Russia

Ice hockey

World Junior Championships
Gold medal – first place	2011 United States	
