= Andrei Kolosov =

Belarusian ice hockey player

- Born: June 8, 1989 (age 35)
- Height: 6 ft 5 in (196 cm)
- Weight: 207 lb (94 kg; 14 st 11 lb)
- Position: Forward
- Shoots: Left
- Belarusian Extraleague team: HK Homiel
- National team: Belarus
- Playing career: 2004-2023–present

Andrei Kolosov (born June 8, 1989) is a Belarusian professional ice hockey player for HK Gomel of the Belarusian Extraleague. He competed in the 2012 IIHF World Championship as a member of the Belarus men's national ice hockey team.
