= Yaroslav Alshevsky =

Russian ice hockey player (born 1991)

- Born: 9 May 1991 (age 33); Nizhnekamsk, Soviet Union
- Height: 6 ft 0 in (183 cm)
- Weight: 170 lb (77 kg; 12 st 2 lb)
- Position: Forward
- Shoots: Left
- VHL team Former teams: Neftyanik Almetievsk; Neftkhimik Nizhnekamsk; Admiral Vladivostok; Kunlun Red Star
- Playing career: 2009–present

Yaroslav Alshevsky (born 9 May 1991) is a Russian professional ice hockey forward. He is currently playing with Neftyanik Almetievsk of the Supreme Hockey League (VHL). He is a teammate with his twin brother, Stanislav Alshevsky.

Alshevsky made his Kontinental Hockey League (KHL) debut playing with HC Neftekhimik Nizhnekamsk during the 2009–10 KHL season.
