= Rafael Akhmetov =

Russian ice hockey player

- Born: January 31, 1989 (age 37) Leninogorsk, Russia
- Height: 6 ft 2 in (188 cm)
- Weight: 192 lb (87 kg; 13 st 10 lb)
- Position: Forward
- Shot: Left
- Played for: Neftekhimik Nizhnekamsk; HK SKP Poprad; Lokomotiv Yaroslavl; Metallurg Novokuznetsk; HC Sochi; Amur Khabarovsk; Neftekhimik Nizhnekamsk; Lada Togliatti
- Playing career: 2009–2020

Rafael Midkhatovich Akhmetov (Russian: Рафаэль Мидхатович Ахметов; born January 31, 1989) is a Russian ice hockey coach and former professional ice hockey player, who currently serves as an assistant coach for Irbis Kazan of the Junior Hockey League (MHL). He most recently played with Lada Togliatti of the Kontinental Hockey League (KHL).

Akhmetov made his KHL debut playing with HC Neftekhimik Nizhnekamsk during the 2008–09 season.
