= Stepan Goryachevskikh =

Russian-Belarusian ice hockey player

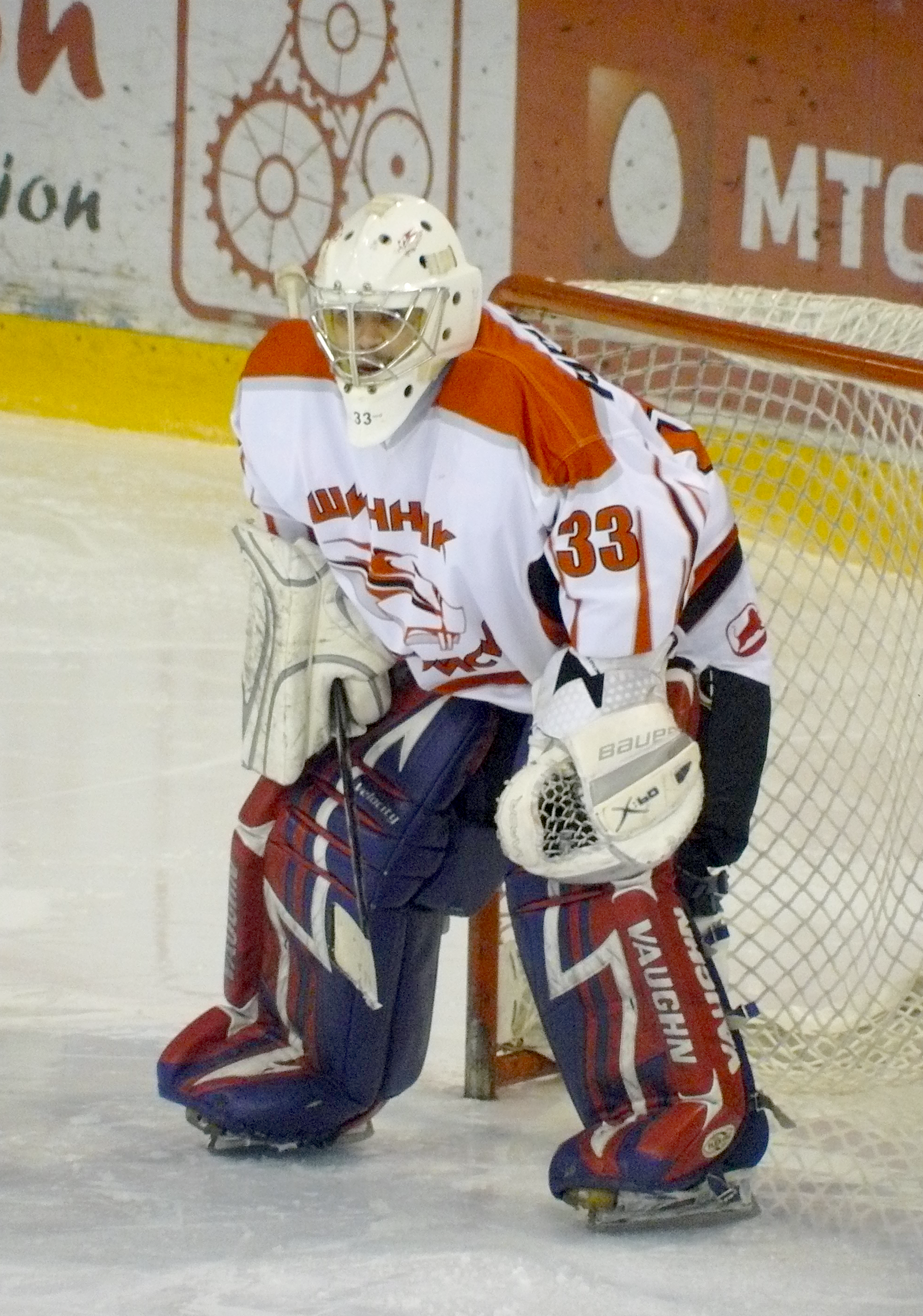
- Stepan Goryachevskikh
- Born: 26 June 1985 (age 39); Nizhnekamsk, Soviet Union
- Height: 5 ft 10 in (178 cm)
- Weight: 170 lb (77 kg; 12 st 2 lb)
- Position: Goaltender
- Catches: Left
- KHL team Former teams: HC Lada Togliatti; HC Neftekhimik Nizhnekamsk; Yunost Minsk; HC Shakhtyor Soligorsk; Shinnik Bobruisk; HC Donbass
- National team: Belarus
- Playing career: 2003–present

Stepan Goryachevskikh (born 26 June 1985) is a Russian-Belarusian professional ice hockey goaltender currently playing HC Lada Togliatti of the Kontinental Hockey League.
