= Kyle Sonnenburg =

Canadian-German ice hockey player

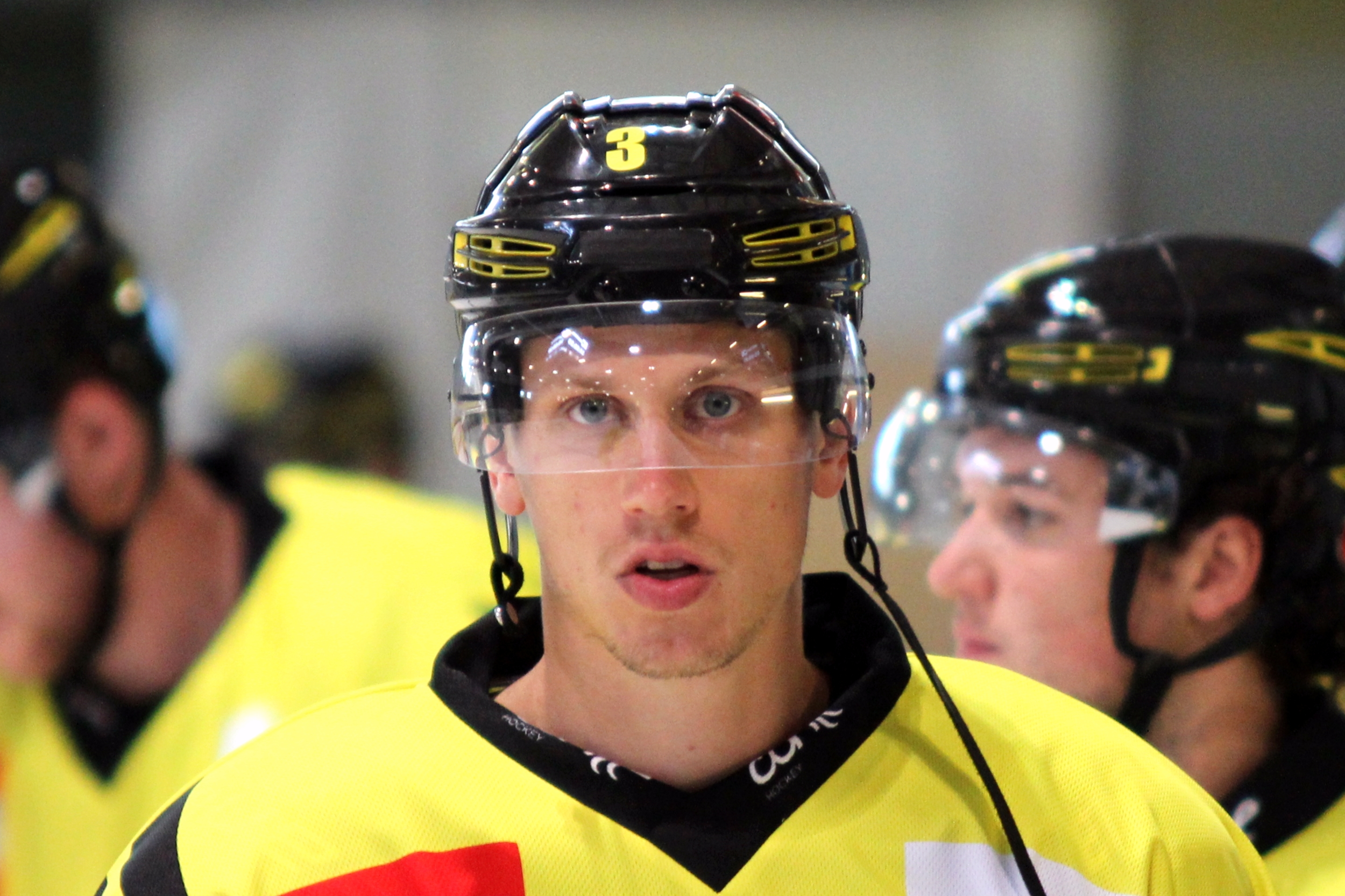
- Kyle Sonnenburg in August 2016
- Born: May 7, 1986 (age 39); Waterloo, Ontario, Canada
- Height: 6 ft 1 in (185 cm)
- Weight: 198 lb (90 kg; 14 st 2 lb)
- Position: Defence
- Shoots: Left
- DEL team Former teams: Schwenninger Wild Wings; Krefeld Pinguine
- NHL draft: Undrafted
- Playing career: 2011–present

Kyle Sonnenburg (born May 7, 1986) is a Canadian–German professional ice hockey defenceman for the Schwenninger Wild Wings of the Deutsche Eishockey Liga (DEL).

== Playing career ==
Sonnenburg played for OHL teams Belleville Bulls and Brampton Battalion before enrolling at the University of Waterloo in 2007. He was named the 2011 Waterloo Male Athlete of the Year and won 2010 and 2011 OUA West Defenceman of the Year honors and was also selected to the CIS All-Canada Second Team during his collegiate career.

In 2011, he represented Team Canada at the World University Games in Erzurum, Turkey, winning bronze.

He first signed with Krefeld Pinguine of the German top flight Deutsche Eishockey Liga (DEL) in 2011 and spent six years with the club. He left Krefeld at the conclusion of the 2016–17 campaign and agreed to terms with fellow DEL side Schwenninger Wild Wings.

At the conclusion of the 2018–19 season, Sonnenburg left the Wild Wings at the completion of his contract. He came back to the team in September 2019.

== Personal life ==
His parents emigrated from Germany to Canada. Kyle received German citizenship in September 2011.

His cousin Riley also played ice hockey at the University of Waterloo.
