= Vasili Tokranov =

Russian ice hockey player

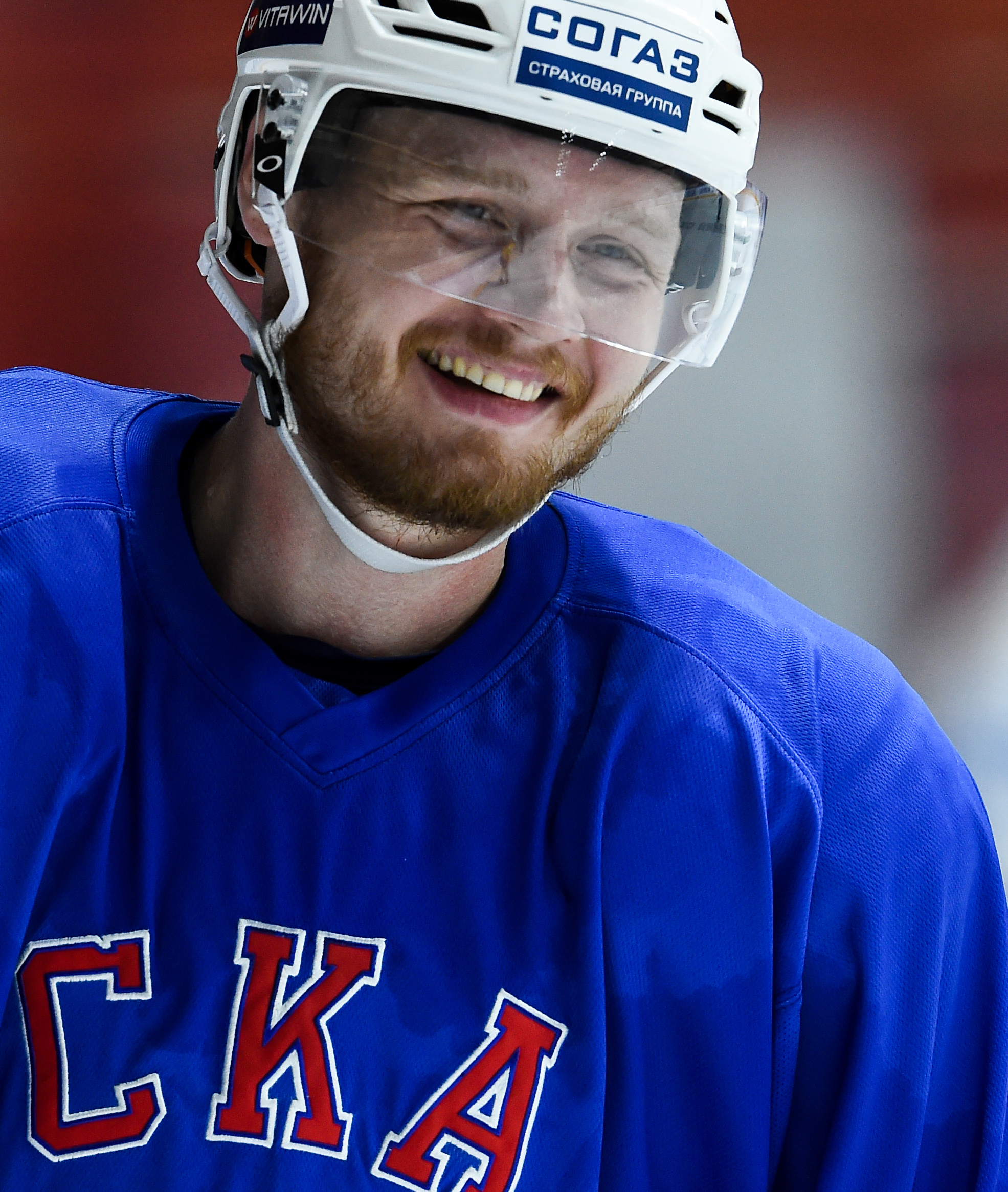
- Portrait of Vasili Tokranov
- Born: August 2, 1989 (age 35); Almetievsk, Russian SFSR, USSR
- Height: 6 ft 0 in (183 cm)
- Weight: 216 lb (98 kg; 15 st 6 lb)
- Position: Defence
- Shoots: Left
- KHL team Former teams: Free Agent; Ak Bars Kazan; SKA Saint Petersburg; Severstal Cherepovets
- Playing career: 2006–present

Vasili Tokranov (born August 2, 1989) is a Russian professional ice hockey defenceman who is currently an unrestricted free agent. He most recently played for Severstal Cherepovets in the Kontinental Hockey League (KHL).

== Playing career ==
Tokranov made his debut in the KHL with Ak Bars Kazan in the inaugural 2008–09 season, appearing in two post-season games.

After claiming the Gagarin Cup with Kazan in the 2017–18 season, Tokranov became a free agent after spending his entirety of his 11-year professional career with Kazan. On May 21, 2018, he agreed to a lucrative four-year contract with SKA Saint Petersburg.

At the conclusion of his four-year tenure with SKA, Tokranov opted to return to his original club, Ak Bars Kazan, in signing a two-year deal on 12 May 2022.

With a year left on his contract, Tokranov was traded by Ak Bars to Severstal Cherepovets in exchange for financial compensation on 5 July 2023.

== Awards and honors ==
Award	Year
KHL
Gagarin Cup (Ak Bars Kazan)	2018
