= Ľubomír Vaškovič =

Slovak ice hockey player

- Born: 2 April 1986 (age 40) Myjava, Czechoslovakia
- Height: 5 ft 8 in (173 cm)
- Weight: 172 lb (78 kg; 12 st 4 lb)
- Position: Left wing
- Shoots: Right
- Czech 2.liga team Former teams: SHK Hodonín; HC Znojemští Orli; HK 32 Liptovský Mikuláš; HK Dukla Trenčín; Dundee Stars; HK 36 Skalica
- Playing career: 2004–present

Ľubomír Vaškovič (born 2 April 1986) is a Slovak professional ice hockey left winger for SHK Hodonín of the Czech 2.liga.

Vaškovič previously played 48 games in the Czech Extraliga for HC Znojemští Orli between 2005 and 2007. He also played 117 games in the Slovak Extraliga for HK 32 Liptovský Mikuláš, HK Dukla Trenčín and HK 36 Skalica and ten games in the Elite Ice Hockey League for the Dundee Stars.
