= Alexander Pavlovich =

Belarusian ice hockey player

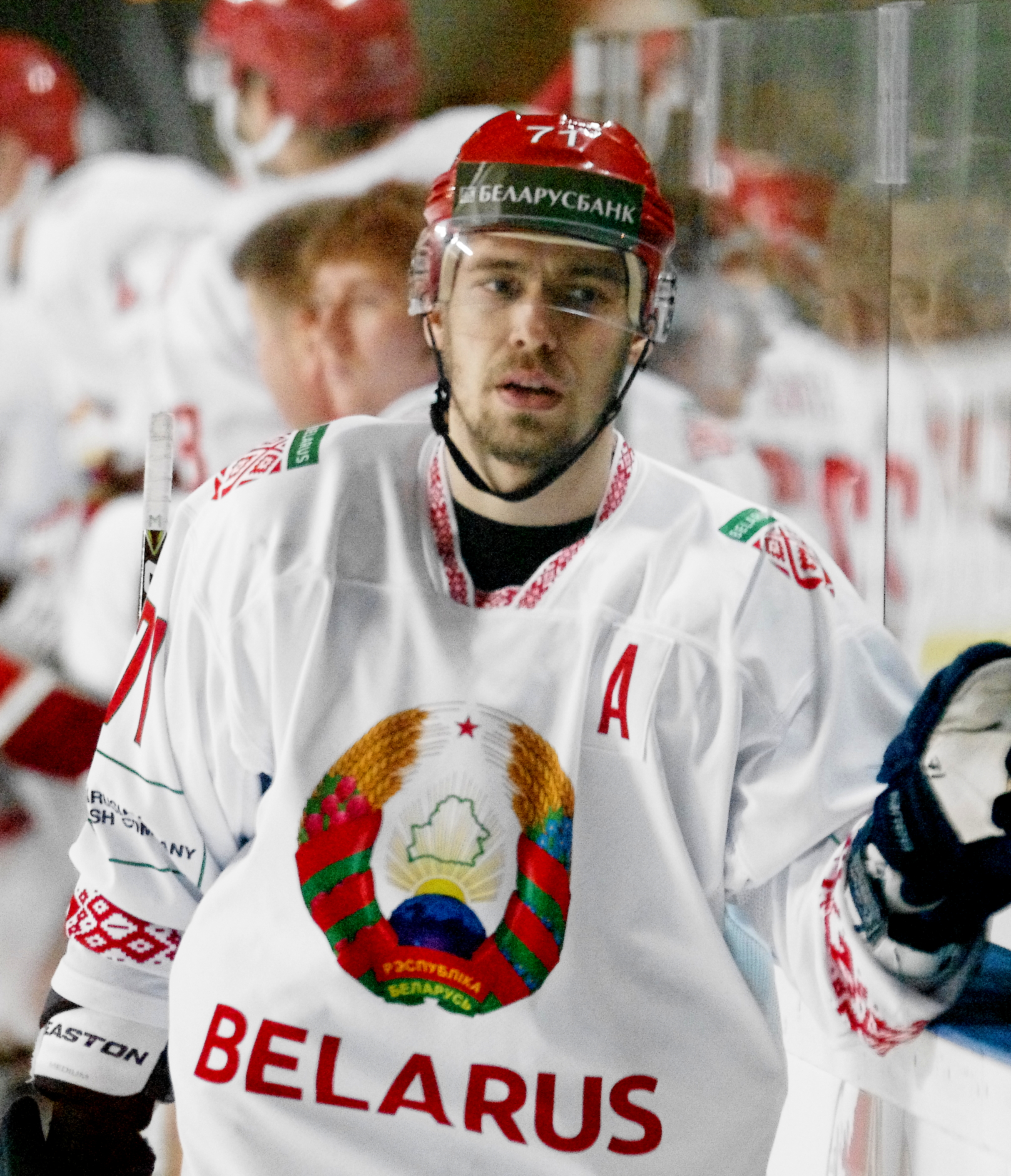
- Born: 12 July 1988 (age 38) Grodno, Belarusian SSR, URS
- Position: Forward
- BLR team Former teams: Yunost Minsk; Dinamo Minsk
- National team: Belarus
- NHL draft: Undrafted
- Playing career: 2008–present

Alexander Yuryevich Pavlovich (Belarusian: Аляксандр Юр'евіч Паўловіч, Russian: Александр Юрьевич Павлович, born 12 July 1988) is a former Belarusian professional ice hockey player who is currently playing for Yunost Minsk in the Belarusian Extraleague. He previously played with Shakhtar Soligorsk in the Belarusian Extraleague and HC Dinamo Minsk in the Kontinental Hockey League (KHL).

He participated at the 2011 IIHF World Championship as a member of the Belarusian national team.
