= Andrei Sergeyev =

Ukrainian-Russian ice hockey player

- Born: March 26, 1991 Simferopol, Ukrainian SSR, Soviet Union
- Height: 5 ft 11 in (180 cm)
- Weight: 243 lb (110 kg; 17 st 5 lb)
- Position: Defence
- Shoots: Right
- KHL team Former teams: Lokomotiv Yaroslavl; Neftekhimik Nizhnekamsk; CSKA Moscow; Amur Khabarovsk; Spartak Moscow; HC Yugra; Dynamo Moscow
- Playing career: 2010–present

Andriy Mykolaiovych Serhieiev (Ukrainian: Андрій Миколайович Сергєєв; born March 26, 1991), also known as Andrei Sergeyev, is a Ukrainian-Russian professional ice hockey defenceman who currently plays for Lokomotiv Yaroslavl of the Kontinental Hockey League (KHL).

Following two seasons with HC Dynamo Moscow, Sergeyev left as a free agent and signed a two-year contract with Lokomotiv Yaroslavl on 1 May 2022.

== Awards and honors ==
Award	Year
KHL
Gagarin Cup champion	2025, 2026
