= Sergei Belokon =

Russian professional ice hockey player

- Born: August 25, 1988 (age 36); Moscow, Russia
- Height: 6 ft 1 in (185 cm)
- Weight: 192 lb (87 kg; 13 st 10 lb)
- Position: Forward
- Shoots: Right
- KHL team Former teams: Spartak Moscow; KHL; Vityaz Chekhov
- NHL draft: Undrafted
- Playing career: 2007–present

Sergei Belokon (born August 25, 1988) is a Russian professional ice hockey player who currently plays for Spartak Moscow of the Kontinental Hockey League (KHL).
