= Pavel Zhitkov =

Kazakhstani ice hockey player

- Born: June 4, 1984 (age 41) Karaganda, Soviet Union
- Height: 5 ft 9 in (175 cm)
- Weight: 172 lb (78 kg; 12 st 4 lb)
- Position: Goaltender
- Caught: Left
- Played for: Arystan Temirtau
- National team: Kazakhstan
- NHL draft: Undrafted
- Playing career: 2006–2016

Pavel Zhitkov (born June 4, 1984) is a Kazakhstani retired ice hockey goaltender who last played for Kulager Petropavl in the Kazakhstan Hockey Championship league. He participated at the 2010 IIHF World Championship as a member of the Kazakhstan men's national ice hockey team, appearing in one game. After retiring as a player, Zhitkov transitioned into a managerial role in hockey.
