= Anne Tuomanen =

Finnish ice hockey player

- Anne Tuomanen in 2022
- Born: 15 April 1987 (age 39) Jyväskylä, Finland
- Height: 164 cm (5 ft 5 in)
- Weight: 62 kg (137 lb; 9 st 11 lb)
- Position: Wing
- Shot: Left
- Played for: Ilves Tampere; HPK Hämeenlinna; SC Reinach; Cats Jyväskylä; JyHC Jyväskylä
- National team: Finland
- Playing career: 2002–2019
Medal record
World Championship
Bronze medal – third place	2011 Switzerland
Universiade
Bronze medal – third place	2009 Harbin	Ice hockey

Anne Tuomanen (born 15 April 1987) is a Finnish retired ice hockey winger and former member of the Finnish national team, who played in the Naisten Liiga (NSML) for fifteen seasons. She was a member of the bronze medal-winning Finnish team at the 2011 IIHF Women's World Championship and the silver medal-winning team at the 2011 Winter Universiade In total, Tuomanen represented Finland in 76 international matches, including at the 2013 IIHF Women's World Championship and at the 2011 MLP Nations Cup.

== Playing career ==
Tuomanen played in the Naisten SM-sarja (renamed Naisten Liiga in 2017) with the Jyväskylän Hockey Cats (JyHC; renamed Cats Jyväskylä in 2004) during 2002 to 2007, HPK during 2009 to 2011 and 2015–16, and the Tampereen Ilves during 2011 to 2015 and from 2016 until her retirement in 2019. Over the course of her career, she played more than 350 Naisten Liiga regular season games and skated in 75 playoff games. She won the Finnish Championship in 2011 with HPK, the inaugural recipients of the Aurora Borealis Cup, won three Finnish Championship silver and two Finnish Championship bronze medals, and was named a 2010–11 Naisten SM-sarja All-Star.

She served as captain of Ilves Tampere during the 2016–17 Naisten SM-sarja season and the 2018–19 Naisten Liiga season.
