= Nikolai Lukyanchikov =

Russian ice hockey player

- Born: May 23, 1989 (age 35); Sudzha, Russia
- Height: 5 ft 11 in (180 cm)
- Weight: 198 lb (90 kg; 14 st 2 lb)
- Position: Defence
- Shot: Left
- Played for: HC Neftekhimik Nizhnekamsk; Avangard Omsk; Torpedo Nizhny Novgorod
- NHL draft: Undrafted
- Playing career: 2005–2018

Nikolai Lukyanchikov (born May 23, 1989) is a Russian former professional ice hockey defenceman who played in the Kontinental Hockey League (KHL) for HC Neftekhimik Nizhnekamsk, Avangard Omsk, and Torpedo Nizhny Novgorod.
