= Cho Hyung-gon =

South Korean ice hockey player (born 1990)

- Born: 23 June 1990 (age 34); Uijeongbu, South Korea
- Height: 180 cm (5 ft 11 in)
- Weight: 92 kg (203 lb; 14 st 7 lb)
- Position: Defenceman
- Shoots: Left
- ALIH team Former teams: Anyang Halla; Sangmu
- National team: South Korea
- Playing career: 2013–present

Cho Hyung-gon (born 23 June 1990 in Uijeongbu) is a South Korean ice hockey defenceman currently playing for Anyang Halla of Asia League Ice Hockey (ALIH). He competed at the 2018 Winter Olympics.
