= Jure Verlič =

Slovenian ice hockey goaltender

- Born: May 12, 1987 (age 37); Maribor, Yugoslavia
- Height: 6 ft 2 in (188 cm)
- Weight: 194 lb (88 kg; 13 st 12 lb)
- Position: Goalie
- Caught: Left
- Played for: HDK Maribor; Vsetínská hokejová Coqs de Courbevoie; Remparts de Tours
- Playing career: 2002–2021

Jure Verlič (born May 12, 1987) is a Slovenian retired professional goaltender.

Verlič played the majority of his career with HDK Maribor in his native Slovenia, from 2002 to 2005 and again from 2007 to 2012. He moved to Vsetínská hokejová in the Czech Republic in 2005 and played one game in the Czech Extraliga for the team during the 2006–07 season.

Verlič also spent five seasons playing in the FFHG Division 1 in France, playing for Coqs de Courbevoie between 2012 and 2016 and for Remparts de Tours during the 2015–16 season.

His younger brother Miha also played the sport professionally.
