= 2008 IIHF Women's World Championship =

Tournament details
- Host country: China
- City: Harbin
- Venues: 2 (in 1 host city)
- Dates: 4–12 April 2008
- Opened by: Hu Jintao
- Teams: 9

Final positions
- Champions: United States (2nd title)
- Runners-up: Canada
- Third place: Finland
- Fourth place: Switzerland

Tournament statistics
- Games played: 20
- Goals scored: 117 (5.85 per game)
- Attendance: 22,910 (1,146 per game)
- Scoring leader: (United States) Natalie Darwitz (10 points)

Awards
- MVP: (Finland) Noora Räty

The 2008 IIHF Women's World Championship was the 11th edition of the Top Division of the Women's Ice Hockey World Championship (the 12th edition overall, if the season when only the lower divisions were played is also counted), organized by the International Ice Hockey Federation (IIHF).

The Top Division tournament was held from 4 to 12 April 2008 in Harbin, People's Republic of China. The games took place at the event's main arena, Baqu Arena. The Division I tournament was played in Ventspils, Latvia, at the Ice Hall of the Ventspils Olimpiskais Centrs from 10 to 16 March 2008. The Division II tournament was held from 25 to 30 March 2008 at the Suomen urheiluopisto ('Sports Institute of Finland') in Vierumäki, Finland.

For the 11th-straight Top Division tournament, the United States win gold medal for the second time, after defeated Canada in the gold medal match. This tournament was the first IIHF Women's tournament in which the host nation (in this case, China) failed to medal. Switzerland competed for a medal for the first time, losing to Finland in the bronze medal game.

== Top Division ==
=== Preliminary round ===
All times are local (China Standard Time – UTC+8).

==== Group A ====
Pos	Team	Pld	W	OTW	OTL	L	GF	GA	GD	Pts	Qualification
1	Canada	2	2	0	0	0	19	1	+18	6	Group D
2	Russia	2	1	0	0	1	6	11	−5	3	Group E
3	China	2	0	0	0	2	3	16	−13	0	Group F

Source: IIHF

4 April 2008; 19:00	Russia	1–8 (1–2, 0–2, 0–4)	Canada	Baqu Arena; Attendance: 1232

Game reference

Maria Onolbayeva
Valentina Ostrovlyanchik
Goalies
Kim St-Pierre
Referee:
(Finland) Ulla Sipilä
Linesmen:
(Sweden) Annika Floeden
(Germany) Daniela Kiefer

	0–1	10:41 – Kellar (Wickenheiser, Ouellette) (PP1)
	0–2	13:16 – Kingsbury
Smolentseva (Terentieva, Gavrilova) – 19:57	1–2
	1–3	32:50 – Botterill (Ouellette, Hefford)
	1–4	35:05 – Agosta (Kingsbury)
	1–5	43:47 – Piper (Hefford, Wickenheiser) (PP2)
	1–6	55:07 – Ouellette (Hefford) (PP1)
	1–7	57:15 – Wickenheiser (Botterill, Piper) (PP1)
	1–8	57:28 – Agosta (Ferrari)

18 min
Penalties
16 min
11
Shots
37

5 April 2008; 19:00	China	3–5 (1–1, 0–2, 2–2)	Russia	Baqu Arena; Attendance: 2009

Game reference

Shi Yao
Goalies
Maria Onolbayeva
Referee:
(United States) Leah Wrazidlo
Linesmen:
(United States) Meghan M. Hishmeh
(Japan) Miyuki Nakayama

	0–1	16:49 – Terentieva (Smolentseva, Gavrilova)
Sun (Wang, Qi) (PP2) – 18:49	1–1
	1–2	21:43 – Smolentseva (Terentieva)
	1–3	25:17 – Smolentseva (Terentieva, Gavrilova)
	1–4	43:34 – Gavrilova (Terentieva, Smolentseva)
Sang (Zhang B.) (PP1) – 46:39	2–4
Sang (Jin, Sun) (PP1) – 59:37	3–4
	3–5	59:56 – Gavrilova (ENG)

16 min
Penalties
26 min
29
Shots
33

6 April 2008; 19:00	Canada	11–0 (4–0, 3–0, 4–0)	China	Baqu Arena; Attendance: 1892

Game reference

Charline Labonté
Goalies
Shi Yao
Referee:
(Norway) Aina Høve
Linesmen:
(Finland) Sanna Pauliina Haapalahti
(Japan) Miyuki Nakayama

Piper (Wickenheiser, Vaillancourt) – 8:21	1–0
Botterill (MacLeod, Hefford) – 10:52	2–0
MacLeod (Bechard) – 13:17	3–0
Botterill (Hefford) – 13:42	4–0
Ouellette (Botterill, Collins) – 25:00	5–0
Agosta (Kellar) – 25:39	6–0
Apps (Sostorics, Kellar) – 26:02	7–0
Wickenheiser (Piper) – 45:12	8–0
Hefford (Ouellette, Botterill) – 46:31	9–0
Wickenheiser (Piper, Vaillancourt) – 50:35	10–0
Vaillancourt (Wickenheiser, Piper) – 53:34	11–0

2 min
Penalties
4 min
46
Shots
5

==== Group B ====
Pos	Team	Pld	W	OTW	OTL	L	GF	GA	GD	Pts	Qualification
1	United States	2	2	0	0	0	15	2	+13	6	Group D
2	Switzerland	2	1	0	0	1	4	7	−3	3	Group E
3	Germany	2	0	0	0	2	1	11	−10	0	Group F

Source: IIHF

4 April 2008; 15:30	Germany	1–8 (1–1, 0–3, 0–4)	United States	Baqu Arena; Attendance: 1390

Game reference

Viona Harrer
Goalies
Jessie Vetter
Referee:
(Czech Republic) Jana Zitková
Linesmen:
(France) Anna Sophie Boniface
(Canada) Heather Richardson

	0–1	14:25 – Potter (Chu) (PP1)
Anwander (Lanzl) – 15:41	1–1
	1–2	21:30 – Potter (Parsons)
	1–3	29:30 – Thatcher (Parsons)
	1–4	31:17 – Duggan (Ruggiero, Darwitz)
	1–5	41:58 – Thatcher (Drazan, Parsons)
	1–6	43:11 – Darwitz (Chu)
	1–7	52:42 – Duggan (Darwitz)
	1–8	56:08 – Parsons (Potter)

10 min
Penalties
8 min
4
Shots
42

5 April 2008; 15:30	Switzerland	3–0 (1–0, 2–0, 0–0)	Germany	Baqu Arena; Attendance: 887

Game reference

Florence Schelling
Goalies
Jennifer Harß
Referee:
(Canada) France Lapratte
Linesmen:
(Canada) Heather Richardson
(Slovakia) Petra Slivková

S. Marty (J. Marty) (SH1) – 15:35	1–0
Ruhnke (Bruggmann, Hafliger) – 23:27	2–0
Nussbaum (J. Marty, Meier) (PP1) – 39:02	3–0

12 min
Penalties
12 min
28
Shots
26

6 April 2008; 15:30	United States	7–1 (1–0, 2–1, 4–0)	Switzerland	Baqu Arena; Attendance: 845

Game reference

Molly Schaus
Goalies
Florence Schelling
Referee:
(Finland) Ulla Sipilä
Linesmen:
(Sweden) Annika Floeden
(China) Liu Chunhua

Cahow (Ruggiero, Drazan) (PP1) – 7:34	1–0
Stack (Knight, Engstrom) – 21:28	2–0
	2–1	24:21 – Hafliger (Schelling) (PP1)
Marvin (Ruggiero, Cahow) (PP1) – 37:17	3–1
Darwitz (Chu, Lawler) (PP1) – 42:06	4–1
Potter (Darwitz, Ruggiero) (PP2) – 49:41	5–1
Engstrom (Cahow, Marvin) – 50:49	6–1
Duggan – 57:12	7–1

8 min
Penalties
24 min
56
Shots
2

==== Group C ====
Pos	Team	Pld	W	OTW	OTL	L	GF	GA	GD	Pts	Qualification
1	Finland	2	1	1	0	0	9	3	+6	5	Group D
2	Sweden	2	1	0	1	0	7	3	+4	4	Group E
3	Japan	2	0	0	0	2	1	11	−10	0	Group F

Source: IIHF

4 April 2008; 12:00	Japan	0–5 (0–2, 0–2, 0–1)	Sweden	Baqu Arena; Attendance: 1543

Game reference

Azusa Nakaoku
Goalies
Sara Grahn
Referee:
(Norway) Aina Høve
Linesmen:
(Finland) Sanna Pauliina Haapalahti
(China) Liu Chunhua

0–1	02:51 – Lorsell
0–2	17:04 – Myrén (Östberg, Enström)
0–3	30:18 – Myrén (Enström)
0–4	37:01 – Rooth (Eliasson) (PP1)
0–5	48:23 – Jordansson (Rooth, Eliasson)

4 min
Penalties
4 min
18
Shots
50

5 April 2008; 12:00	Finland	6–1 (0–0, 2–1, 4–0)	Japan	Baqu Arena; Attendance: 896

Game reference

Noora Räty
Goalies
Nana Fujimoto
Referee:
(Germany) Nicole Hertrich
Linesmen:
(France) Anne Sophie Boniface
(Germany) Daniela Kiefer

Helin (Voutilainen, Kovalainen) – 23:55	1–0
	1–1	Wada (Fujii, Adachi) (PP2) – 26:35
Pelttari (Pehkonen, Saarinen) – 28:05	2–1
Kovalainen (Tallus, Saarinen) (PP2) – 44:23	3–1
Helin (Laaksonen, Hiirikoski) (PP1) – 44:42	4–1
Saarinen (Pelttari) (PP1) – 50:00	5–1
Helin (Voutilainen) (PP1) – 52:02	6–1

16 min
Penalties
18 min
38
Shots
7

6 April 2008; 12:00	Sweden	2–3 OT (1–1, 0–0, 1–1) (OT: 0–1)	Finland	Baqu Arena; Attendance: 866

Game reference

Kim Martin
Goalies
Noora Räty
Referee:
(Canada) France Lapratte
Linesmen:
(United States) Meghan M. Hishmeh
(Slovakia) Petra Slivková

	0–1	05:11 – Voutilainen (Rantamäki, Laaksonen) (PP1)
Timglas (Jordansson, Rundqvist) (PP1) – 07:02	1–1
	1–2	42:01 – Saarinen (Pehkonen)
Eliasson (Holmlöv, Rundqvist) – 50:56	2–2
	2–3	63:00 – Pehkonen (Pelttari, Hiirikoski) (PP1)

14 min
Penalties
10 min
12
Shots
19

=== Qualifying round ===
All times are local (China Standard Time – UTC+8).

==== Group D (1st–3rd place) ====
Pos	Team	Pld	W	OTW	OTL	L	GF	GA	GD	Pts	Qualification
1	United States	2	1	0	1	0	4	3	+1	4	Final
2	Canada	2	1	0	0	1	6	6	0	3	Final
3	Finland	2	0	1	0	1	3	4	−1	2	3rd place match

Source: IIHF

8 April 2008; 12:00	United States	0–1 OT (0–0, 0–0, 0–0) (OT: 0–1)	Finland	Baqu Arena; Attendance: 804

Game reference
Jessie Vetter	Goalies	Noora Räty	Referee: (Norway) Aina Høve; Linesmen: (Canada) Heather Richardson (Slovakia) Petra Slivková
0–1 / 63:42 – Pelttari (Tallus, Pehkonen) (PP2)			Referee: (Norway) Aina Høve; Linesmen: (Canada) Heather Richardson (Slovakia) Petra Slivková
10 min	Penalties	6 min	Referee: (Norway) Aina Høve; Linesmen: (Canada) Heather Richardson (Slovakia) Petra Slivková
30	Shots	15	Referee: (Norway) Aina Høve; Linesmen: (Canada) Heather Richardson (Slovakia) Petra Slivková

9 April 2008; 12:00	Finland	2–4 (1–1, 0–3, 1–0)	Canada	Baqu Arena; Attendance: 963

Game reference

Noora Räty
Goalies
Kim St-Pierre
Referee:
(United States) Leah Wrazidlo
Linesmen:
(Sweden) Annika Floeden
(Germany) Daniela Kiefer

	0–1	03:29 – Hefford (Wickenheiser, Piper)
Laaksonen (Helin, Rantamäki) – 13:49	1–1
	1–2	31:23 – Vaillancourt (Wickenheiser) (PP1)
	1–3	32:01 – Vaillancourt (Botterill) (PP1)
	1–4	37:25 – Weatherston (MacLeod)
Pehkonen – 46:41	2–4

10 min
Penalties
12 min
12
Shots
34

10 April 2008; 12:00	Canada	2–4 (2–1, 0–1, 0–2)	United States	Baqu Arena; Attendance: 1096

Game reference

Charline Labonté
Goalies
Jessie Vetter
Referee:
(Germany) Nicole Hertrich
Linesmen:
(Finland) Sanna Pauliina Haapalahti
(Japan) Miyuki Nakayama

Hefford (Kingsbury, Kellar) (PP1) – 04:21	1–0
	1–1	15:34 – Darwitz (Lawler, Chu) (PP1)
Bechard (MacLeod) – 16:08	2–1
	2–2	26:33 – Cahow (Marvin, Drazan) (PP1)
	2–3	48:24 – Duggan (Darwitz, Potter)
	2–4	59:36 – Darwitz (Chu) (ENG)

20 min
Penalties
18 min
16
Shots
20

==== Group E (4th–6th place) ====
Pos	Team	Pld	W	OTW	OTL	L	GF	GA	GD	Pts	Qualification
1	Switzerland	2	1	1	0	0	6	4	+2	5	3rd place match
2	Sweden	2	1	0	1	0	6	5	+1	4	
3	Russia	2	0	0	0	2	2	5	−3	0	

Source: IIHF

8 April 2008; 15:30	Switzerland	4–3 GWS (2–1, 1–2, 0–0) (OT: 0–0) (SO: 1–0)	Sweden	Baqu Arena; Attendance: 812

Game reference

Florence Schelling
Goalies
Kim Martin
Referee:
(United States) Leah Wrazidlo
Linesmen:
(Germany) Daniela Kiefer
(Denmark) Malene Skovbakke

Lehmann (Leimgruber) (SH1) – 17:59	1–0
	1–1	18:30 – Asserholt (Enström) (PP1)
S. Marty (Nussbaum, Ehrbar) – 19:49	2–1
	2–2	22:02 – Jordansson (Östberg)
Lehmann (S. Marty, Nussbaum) – 28:46	3–2
	3–3	34:15 – Enström (Winberg, Nordin) (PP1)

Lehmann
Shootout

20 min
Penalties
8 min
11
Shots
31

9 April 2008; 15:30	Sweden	3–1 (1–0, 1–0, 1–1)	Russia	Baqu Arena; Attendance: 804

Game reference

Kim Martin
Goalies
Maria Onolbayeva
Referee:
(Germany) Nicole Hertrich
Linesmen:
(United States) Meghan M. Hishmeh
(Japan) Miyuki Nakayama

Myrén (Östberg, Enström) – 01:39	1–0
Winberg (Holmlöv, Nordin) – 35:06	2–0
Timglas (Jordansson, Rooth) (PP1) – 44:10	3–0
	3–1	56:12 – Smolentseva (Sergina, Gavrilova) (PP2)

18 min
Penalties
8 min
27
Shots
19

10 April 2008; 15:30	Russia	1–2 (0–1, 1–1, 0–0)	Switzerland	Baqu Arena; Attendance: 884

Game reference

Maria Onolbayeva
Goalies
Florence Schelling
Referee:
(Czech Republic) Jana Zitková
Linesmen:
(China) Liu Chunhua
(Denmark) Malene Skovbakke

	0–1	11:26 – S. Marty (Lehmann)
	0–2	20:54 – S. Marty (Lehmann, Nussbaum) (PP2)
Kapustina (Khomich, Burina) (PP2) – 35:41	1–2

37 min
Penalties
26 min
34
Shots
23

=== Consolation round ===
All times are local (China Standard Time – UTC+8).

==== Group F (7th–9th place) ====
Pos	Team	Pld	W	OTW	OTL	L	GF	GA	GD	Pts	Relegation
1	Japan	2	1	0	0	1	4	3	+1	3	
2	China	2	1	0	0	1	5	5	0	3	
3	Germany	2	1	0	0	1	4	5	−1	3	Relegated to the 2009 Division I

Source: IIHF

8 April 2008; 19:00	Germany	2–1 (2–1, 0–0, 0–0)	Japan	Baqu Arena; Attendance: 833

Game reference

Viona Harrer
Goalies
Azusa Nakaoku
Referee:
(Finland) Ulla Sipilä
Linesmen:
(France) Anne Sophie Boniface
(China) Liu Chunhua

Evers (Seiler, Fellner) – 02:47	1–0
Anwander (Lanzl, Tamas) – 03:32	2–0
	2–1	10:36 – Adachi (Wada, Fujii) (PP1)

14 min
Penalties
10 min
16
Shots
14

9 April 2008; 19:00	Japan	3–1 (1–0, 0–0, 2–1)	China	Baqu Arena; Attendance: 2146

Game reference

Azusa Nakaoku
Goalies
Shi Yao
Referee:
(Czech Republic) Jana Zitková
Linesmen:
(Denmark) Malene Skovbakke
(Slovakia) Petra Slivková

Adachi (Yamane, Wada) (PP2) – 17:42	1–0
	1–1	41:47 – Sun (Huo)
Hirano (Kondo, Sakagami) (PP2) – 57:04	2–1
Fujii (Yamanaka) – 59:20	3–1

16 min
Penalties
20 min
14
Shots
23

10 April 2008; 19:00	China	4–2 (1–1, 0–1, 3–0)	Germany	Baqu Arena; Attendance: 1984

Game reference

Shi Yao
Goalies
Jennifer Harß
Referee:
(Canada) France Lapratte
Linesmen:
Anne Sophie Boniface
(Sweden) Annika Floeden

	0–1	10:23 – Gotz (Kruck) (PP1)
Jin (Sun) – 12:32	1–1
	1–2	23:46 – Ritter (Tamas, Fruehwirt) (PP1)
Wang (Jin, Sun) (PP1) – 57:58	2–2
Sun (Wang, Jin) – 58:43	3–2
Zhang S. (Qi) – 59:20	4–2

14 min
Penalties
12 min
29
Shots
19

=== Final round ===
==== 3rd place match ====
12 April 2008; 15:30	Finland	4–1 (0–1, 1–0, 3–0)	Switzerland	Baqu Arena; Attendance: 1024

Game reference

Noora Räty
Goalies
Florence Schelling
Referee:
(United States) Leah Wrazidlo
Linesmen:
(United States) Meghan M. Hishmeh
(Canada) Heather Richardson

	0–1	05:18 – Lehmann (S. Marty, Meier)
Pehkonen (Rantamäki) – 25:05	1–1
Saarinen (Pelttari) – 41:09	2–1
Tikkinen – 46:25	3–1
Hiirikoski (Rantamäki, Laaksonen) (PP1) – 55:00	4–1

8 min
Penalties
12 min
38
Shots
10

==== Final ====
12 April 2008; 19:00	United States	4–3 (2–1, 2–0, 0–2)	Canada	Baqu Arena

Game reference

Jessie Vetter
Goalies
Kim St-Pierre
Charline Labonté
Referee:
(Germany) Nicole Hertrich
Linesmen:
(Finland) Sanna Pauliina Haapalahti
(Japan) Miyuki Nakayama

	0–1	01:57 – Vaillancourt (Kingsbury)
Potter (Duggan, Chu) (PP1) – 08:08	1–1
Darwitz (Bellamy, Cahow) – 17:41	2–1
Potter (Ruggiero, Chu) (PP2) – 30:54	3–1
Darwitz (Bellamy) – 38:30	4–1
	4–2	48:38 – Weatherston (Kellar, Sostorics)
	4–3	49:48 – Botterill (Ouellette) (PP1)

22 min
Penalties
26 min
29
Shots
24

=== Final standings ===
Rank	Team
1st place, gold medalist(s)	United States
2nd place, silver medalist(s)	Canada
3rd place, bronze medalist(s)	Finland
4	Switzerland
5	Sweden
6	Russia
7	Japan
8	China
9	Germany

Relegated to the 2009 Division I

2008 IIHF Women's World champions

United States
Second title

=== Awards and statistics ===
==== Scoring leaders ====
Pos	Player	Country	GP	G	A	Pts	+/−	PIM
1	Natalie Darwitz	United States	5	6	4	10	+7	2
2	Hayley Wickenheiser	Canada	5	3	6	9	+2	6
3	Jennifer Botterill	Canada	5	4	4	8	+4	4
4	Jayna Hefford	Canada	5	3	5	8	+4	8
5	Cherie Piper	Canada	5	2	6	8	+2	0
6	Jenny Potter	United States	5	5	2	7	+5	2
7	Julie Chu	United States	5	0	7	7	+2	2
8	Yekaterina Smolentseva	Russia	4	4	2	6	+4	33
9	Kathrin Lehmann	Switzerland	5	4	2	6	+5	8
9	Stefanie Marty	Switzerland	5	4	2	6	+6	10
9	Sarah Vaillancourt	Canada	5	4	2	6	+1	8

GP = Games played; G = Goals; A = Assists; Pts = Points; +/− = P Plus–minus; PIM = Penalties In Minutes
Source: IIHF.com

==== Goaltending leaders ====
(minimum 40% team's total ice time)

Pos	Player	Country	TOI	GA	GAA	Sv%	SO
1	Noora Räty	Finland	243:42	6	1.48	92.59	1
2	Florence Schelling	Switzerland	305:00	15	2.95	91.89	1
3	Azusa Nakaoku	Japan	179:31	8	2.67	91.01	0
4	Charline Labonté	Canada	138:29	3	1.30	90.91	1
5	Jessie Vetter	United States	243:42	7	1.72	88.14	0

TOI = Time on ice (minutes:seconds); GA = Goals against; GAA = Goals against average; Sv% = Save percentage; SO = Shutouts
Source: IIHF.com

==== Directorate Awards ====
- Goaltender: Noora Räty, Finland
- Defenseman: Angela Ruggiero, United States
- Forward: Natalie Darwitz, United States

Source: IIHF.com

==== Media All-Stars ====
- Goaltender: (Finland) Noora Räty
- Defensemen: (United States) Julie Chu, (Finland) Emma Laaksonen
- Forwards: (Canada) Jayna Hefford, (Canada) Hayley Wickenheiser, (United States) Natalie Darwitz
- MVP: (Finland) Noora Räty

== Division I ==
The Division I tournament was played in Ventspils, Latvia, at the Ice Hall of the Ventspils Olimpiskais Centrs, from 10 to 16 March 2008.

Pos	Team	Pld	W	OTW	OTL	L	GF	GA	GD	Pts	Promotion or relegation
1	Kazakhstan	5	4	0	0	1	14	8	+6	12	Promoted to the 2009 Top Division
2	Slovakia	5	3	1	0	1	14	11	+3	11	
3	Czech Republic	5	2	1	0	2	12	11	+1	8	
4	France	5	2	0	0	3	7	12	−5	6	
5	Norway	5	1	0	1	3	11	13	−2	4	
6	Latvia (H)	5	1	0	1	3	9	12	−3	4	Relegated to the 2009 Division II

Source: IIHF
(H) Host

All times are local (Eastern European Time – UTC+2).

10 March 2008; 13:00	Czech Republic	3–1 (1–0, 1–0, 1–1)	France	Ventspils OC Ice Hall; Attendance: 50

Game reference

Radka Lhotská
Goalies
Orane Leenders
Referee:
(Finland) Päivi Laurila
Linesmen:
(Russia) Elena Ivanova
(Finland) Anna Majapuro

Holešová (Studentová, Polenská) – 03:15	1–0
Polenská (Studentová) – 22:23	2–0
	2–1	46:15 – Serre (Allemoz, Bouetz)
Šťastná (Polenská) – 58:03	3–1

26 min
Penalties
18 min
30
Shots
28

10 March 2008; 16:30	Slovakia	1–5 (1–2, 0–2, 0–1)	Kazakhstan	Ventspils OC Ice Hall; Attendance: 52

Game reference

Zuzana Tomčíková
Goalies
Darya Obydennova
Referee:
(Germany) Michaela Kiefer
Linesmen:
(Latvia) Sandra Minakovska
(Germany) Veronika Stenzel

	0–1	07:11 – Potapova (Ibragimova) (SH1)
	0–2	16:48 – Tukhtiyeva (Potapova)
Kapustová (Babiaková) – 17:40	1–2
	1–3	27:08 – Potapova (Ibragimova, Tukhtiyeva)
	1–4	33:34 – Tukhtiyeva (Shu) (PP2)
	1–5	55:01 – Tukhtiyeva (Potapova, Ibragimova) (PP1)

14 min
Penalties
16 min
13
Shots
55

10 March 2008; 20:00	Norway	3–1 (0–0, 2–1, 1–0)	Latvia	Ventspils OC Ice Hall; Attendance: 652

Game reference

Christine Smestad
Goalies
Lolita Andriševska
Referee:
(Netherlands) Debbie Hengst
Linesmen:
(Switzerland) Evelyn Loretan
(Netherlands) Ilse Robben

	0–1	24:42 – Greiere (Bičevska, Pētersone)
Renli (Sletbak) – 26:20	1–1
Martinsen (Øien, Ask) (PP1) – 35:16	2–1
Øien (Dahl, Haraldsen) – 48:08	3–1

10 min
Penalties
10 min
23
Shots
26

11 March 2008; 13:00	France	1–5 (1–1, 0–3, 0–1)	Slovakia	Ventspils OC Ice Hall; Attendance: 22

Game reference

Orane Leenders
Goalies
Zuzana Tomčíková
Referee:
(Netherlands) Debbie Hengst
Linesmen:
(Switzerland) Evelyn Loretan
(Netherlands) Ilse Robben

Allemoz (Iszraelewicz, Serre) (PP1) – 10:16	1–0
	1–1	15:46 – Celárová (Moravčíková, Matejová)
	1–2	24:52 – Veličková (Daňková)
	1–3	29:20 – Moravčíková (Kapustová, Raková) (PP1)
	1–4	31:14 – Pravlíková (Veličková)
	1–5	59:55 – Čulíková (Daňková, Kapustová)

6 min
Penalties
12 min
21
Shots
29

11 March 2008; 16:30	Kazakhstan	3–2 (1–0, 1–0, 1–2)	Norway	Ventspils OC Ice Hall; Attendance: 101

Game reference

Darya Obydennova
Goalies
Christine Smestad
Referee:
(Finland) Päivi Laurila
Linesmen:
(United States) Alicia Hanrahan
(Latvia) Sandra Minakovska

Tukhtiyeva (Shtelmaister, Vassina) (SH1) – 16:23	1–0
Sazonova (Tukhtiyeva) – 37:06	2–0
	2–1	43:06 – Øien (Harmens)
Tukhtiyeva (Kryukova) – 56:06	3–1
	3–2	57:35 – Øien

22 min
Penalties
14 min
37
Shots
15

11 March 2008; 20:00	Latvia	3–4 (1–1, 1–0, 1–3)	Czech Republic	Ventspils OC Ice Hall; Attendance: 493

Game reference

Lolita Andriševska
Goalies
Radka Lhotská
Referee:
(Germany) Michaela Kiefer
Linesmen:
(Finland) Anna Majapuro
(Germany) Veronika Stenzel

Koka (PS) – 11:33	1–0
	1–1	18:29 – Holešová (Polenská) (SH1)
Geca-Miljone (Koka, Liepiņa) – 20:07	2–1
	2–2	47:00 – Tomigová (Šťastná)
	2–3	55:28 – Tomigová (Jandíková)
	2–4	57:20 – Studentová (Mastná)
Koka (Geca-Miljone) – 58:03	3–4

16 min
Penalties
16 min
23
Shots
47

13 March 2008; 13:00	Slovakia	3–2 (1–1, 1–0, 1–1)	Norway	Ventspils OC Ice Hall; Attendance: 44

Game reference

Zuzana Tomčíková
Goalies
Jorid Dagfinrud Øiestad
Referee:
(Germany) Michaela Kiefer
Linesmen:
(Switzerland) Evelyn Loretan
(Latvia) Sandra Minakovska

	0–1	08:08 – Dahl (Lien, Farstad) (PP1)
Veličková (Kapustová) – 17:46	1–1
Veličková – 27:57	2–1
	2–2	41:23 – Carlsson (Ask) (PP1)
Čulíková (Daňková) (PP1) – 48:28	3–2

22 min
Penalties
18 min
51
Shots
34

13 March 2008; 16:30	Kazakhstan	3–1 (2–1, 1–0, 0–0)	Czech Republic	Ventspils OC Ice Hall; Attendance: 52

Game reference

Darya Obydennova
Goalies
Radka Lhotská
Referee:
(Canada) Mélanie Bordeleau
Linesmen:
(Russia) Elena Ivanova
(Netherlands) Ilse Robben

	0–1	01:08 – Tomigová (Mastná, Jandíková)
Sazonova (Nazyrova) – 07:00	1–1
Kryukova (Shu) – 11:06	2–1
Potapova (Shtelmaister) – 31:43	3–1

16 min
Penalties
12 min
53
Shots
39

13 March 2008; 20:00	Latvia	0–1 (0–0, 0–1, 0–0)	France	Ventspils OC Ice Hall; Attendance: 666

Game reference
Lolita Andriševska	Goalies	Orane Leenders	Referee: (Finland) Päivi Laurila; Linesmen: (United States) Alicia Hanrahan (Germany) Veronika Stenzel
0–1 / 29:46 – Iszraelewicz (Serre) (PP2)			Referee: (Finland) Päivi Laurila; Linesmen: (United States) Alicia Hanrahan (Germany) Veronika Stenzel
14 min	Penalties	22 min	Referee: (Finland) Päivi Laurila; Linesmen: (United States) Alicia Hanrahan (Germany) Veronika Stenzel
33	Shots	42	Referee: (Finland) Päivi Laurila; Linesmen: (United States) Alicia Hanrahan (Germany) Veronika Stenzel

14 March 2008; 13:00	Norway	2–3 GWS (1–0, 0–1, 1–1) (OT: 0–0) (SO: 0–1)	Czech Republic	Ventspils OC Ice Hall; Attendance: 60

Game reference

Christine Smestad
Goalies
Radka Lhotská
Referee:
(Netherlands) Debbie Hengst
Linesmen:
(Latvia) Sandra Minakovska
(Germany) Veronika Stenzel

Sletbak (Farstad) – 06:14	1–0
	1–1	30:30 – Tomigová (Herzigová, Šťastná)
	1–2	42:47 – Studentová (Polenská, Holešová)
Sletbak (Øien) – 56:23	2–2

Shootout
Mastná
20 min
Penalties
16 min
23
Shots
34

14 March 2008; 16:30	France	1–2 (1–1, 0–0, 0–1)	Kazakhstan	Ventspils OC Ice Hall; Attendance: 29

Game reference

Orane Leenders
Goalies
Darya Obydennova
Referee:
(Germany) Michaela Kiefer
Linesmen:
(Russia) Elena Ivanova
(Finland) Anna Majapuro

Bouetz (Allemoz, Serre) – 05:47	1–0
	1–1	06:19 – Potapova (Ibragimova, Tukhtiyeva)
	1–2	58:03 – Potapova (Ibragimova)

12 min
Penalties
20 min
39
Shots
29

14 March 2008; 20:00	Latvia	2–3 GWS (1–0, 0–1, 1–1) (OT: 0–0) (SO: 0–1)	Slovakia	Ventspils OC Ice Hall; Attendance: 450

Game reference

Lolita Andriševska
Goalies
Zuzana Tomčíková
Referee:
(Canada) Mélanie Bordeleau
Linesmen:
(United States) Alicia Hanrahan
(Switzerland) Evelyn Loretan

Greiere – 14:57	1–0
	1–1	28:12 – Veličková (Pravlíková)
	1–2	55:48 – Džurňáková (Čulíková) (SH1)
Geca-Miljone (Koka) – 57:05	2–2

Shootout
Karafiátová
14 min
Penalties
14 min
32
Shots
43

16 March 2008; 13:00	Czech Republic	1–2 (0–1, 0–0, 1–1)	Slovakia	Ventspils OC Ice Hall; Attendance: 49

Game reference

Radka Lhotská
Goalies
Zuzana Tomčíková
Referee:
(Finland) Päivi Laurila
Linesmen:
(United States) Alicia Hanrahan
(Latvia) Sandra Minakovska

	0–1	06:55 – Kapustová (Pravlíková)
	0–2	44:32 – Karafiátová (Brémová) (PP1)
Holešová (Studentová) (PP2) – 58:17	1–2

18 min
Penalties
24 min
32
Shots
25

16 March 2008; 16:30	France	3–2 (1–0, 1–0, 1–2)	Norway	Ventspils OC Ice Hall; Attendance: 33

Game reference

Maïwenn Lombard
Goalies
Jorid Dagfinrud Øiestad
Referee:
(Canada) Mélanie Bordeleau
Linesmen:
(Russia) Elena Ivanova
(Germany) Veronika Stenzel

Serre (Rangeon, Marin) (PP1) – 12:23	1–0
Iszraelewicz (Obre, Marin) – 24:49	2–0
	2–1	45:49 – Øien
Serre (ENG) – 59:14	3–1
	3–2	59:47 – Øien

12 min
Penalties
18 min
32
Shots
33

16 March 2008; 20:00	Kazakhstan	1–3 (1–0, 0–3, 0–0)	Latvia	Ventspils OC Ice Hall; Attendance: 532

Game reference

Darya Obydennova
Goalies
Lolita Andriševska
Referee:
(Netherlands) Debbie Hengst
Linesmen:
(Finland) Anna Majapuro
(Netherlands) Ilse Robben

Tukhtiyeva (Ibragimova, Shtelmaister) – 13:18	1–0
	1–1	36:46 – Mihejenko (Bičevska, Pone) (PP1)
	1–2	37:30 – Geca-Miljone (Koka)
	1–3	39:20 – Geca-Miljone (Sakne)

20 min
Penalties
16 min
36
Shots
27

=== Awards and statistics ===
==== Scoring leaders ====
Pos	Player	Country	GP	G	A	Pts	+/−	PIM
1	Zarina Tukhtiyeva	Kazakhstan	5	6	3	9	+5	10
2	Line Bialik Øien	Norway	5	5	2	7	+1	4
2	Olga Potapova	Kazakhstan	5	5	2	7	+6	6
4	Sophie Serre	France	5	3	3	6	−1	4
5	Lyubov Ibragimova	Kazakhstan	5	0	6	6	+6	14
6	Inese Geca-Miljone	Latvia	5	4	1	5	+2	2
6	Martina Veličková	Slovakia	5	4	1	5	+6	10
8	Jana Kapustová	Slovakia	5	2	3	5	+6	8
8	Iveta Koka	Latvia	5	2	3	5	+2	6
8	Simona Studentová	Czech Republic	5	2	3	5	0	2

GP = Games played; G = Goals; A = Assists; Pts = Points; +/− = P Plus–minus; PIM = Penalties In Minutes
Source: IIHF.com

==== Goaltending leaders ====
(minimum 40% team's total ice time)

Pos	Player	Country	TOI	GA	GAA	Sv%	SO
1	Darya Obydennova	Kazakhstan	300:00	8	1.60	93.98	0
2	Lolita Andriševska	Latvia	303:38	12	2.37	93.72	0
3	Zuzana Tomčíková	Slovakia	305:00	11	2.16	93.68	0
4	Christine Smestad	Norway	184:52	7	2.27	92.78	0
5	Radka Lhotská	Czech Republic	304:44	11	2.17	92.76	0
6	Orane Leenders	France	239:10	10	2.51	91.74	1

TOI = Time on ice (minutes:seconds); GA = Goals against; GAA = Goals against average; Sv% = Save percentage; SO = Shutouts
Source: IIHF.com

==== Directorate Awards ====
- Goaltender: Zuzana Tomčíková, Slovakia
- Defenseman: Tatyana Shtelmaister, Kazakhstan
- Forward: Iveta Koka, Latvia

Source: IIHF.com

== Division II ==
The Division II tournament was played from 25 to 30 March 2008 at the Suomen urheiluopisto ('Sports Institute of Finland') in Vierumäki, Finland.

Pos	Team	Pld	W	OTW	OTL	L	GF	GA	GD	Pts	Promotion or relegation
1	Austria	5	5	0	0	0	22	10	+12	15	Promoted to the 2009 Division I
2	Denmark	5	4	0	0	1	25	7	+18	12	
3	North Korea	5	3	0	0	2	21	10	+11	9	
4	Italy	5	1	1	0	3	15	17	−2	5	
5	Netherlands	5	1	0	1	3	10	15	−5	4	
6	Australia	5	0	0	0	5	5	39	−34	0	Relegated to the 2011 Division III

Source: IIHF

All times are local (Eastern European Time – UTC+2; on 30 March Eastern European Summer Time – UTC+3).

25 March 2008; 13:30	North Korea	1–5 (0–2, 0–2, 1–1)	Denmark	Vierumäki Ice Rink; Attendance: 90

Game reference

Hong Kum Sil
Goalies
Nanna Holm Glaas
Referee:
(Czech Republic) Radka Růžičková
Linesmen:
(Czech Republic) Zuzana Arazimová
(Norway) Marlen Vedvik Hansen

	0–1	04:21 – Itenov (Schaffer)
	0–2	16:26 – Henriksen (Jakobsen)
	0–3	26:56 – Jakobsen (Henriksen) (PP1)
	0–4	39:29 – Østergaard (Henriksen, Jakobsen)
	0–5	41:52 – Clausen (Jensen)
Ri S. – 48:06	1–5

12 min
Penalties
10 min
28
Shots
36

25 March 2008; 17:00	Australia	2–6 (0–2, 2–3, 0–1)	Austria	Vierumäki Ice Rink; Attendance: 87

Game reference

Kristy Bruske
Goalies
Nina Geyer
Referee:
(Switzerland) Angela Blasimann
Linesmen:
(Slovakia) Michaela Kúdeľová
(Switzerland) Anne Ruth Kuonen

	0–1	09:22 – Janach (Strer) (SH1)
	0–2	10:12 – Altmann (Schwarzler) (SH1)
	0–3	23:16 – Altmann (Schwarzler) (SH1)
Stock – 25:56	1–3
Parrington (K. White, Padjen) (PP1) – 33:16	2–3
	2–4	37:37 – Schwarzler (Altmann) (SH1)
	2–5	39:39 – Altmann (Schwarzler) (PP2)
	2–6	52:45 – Verworner (Janach, Weber)

8 min
Penalties
20 min
35
Shots
45

25 March 2008; 20:30	Italy	3–2 GWS (1–1, 0–0, 1–1) (OT: 0–0) (SO: 1–0)	Netherlands	Vierumäki Ice Rink; Attendance: 78

Game reference

Chiara Traversa
Goalies
Claudia van Leeuwen
Referee:
(United States) Erin Blair
Linesmen:
(South Korea) Lee Tae Ri
(Finland) Johanna Tauriainen

Bazzanella (Dalprà) – 00:42	1–0
	1–1	14:49 – Admiraal (Boelhouwers, Ernst)
Florian (PP1) – 44:37	2–1
	2–2	58:53 – Elderhorst (Schipper) (PP2)

Viel
Shootout

47 min
Penalties
22 min
30
Shots
21

26 March 2008; 13:30	Denmark	2–3 (0–0, 0–2, 2–1)	Austria	Vierumäki Ice Rink; Attendance: 54

Game reference

Nanna Holm Glaas
Goalies
Sandra Borschke
Referee:
(United States) Erin Blair
Linesmen:
(Czech Republic) Zuzana Arazimová
(South Korea) Lee Tae Ri

	0–1	24:32 – Altmann (Kantor) (PP1)
	0–2	27:13 – Schwarzler
Østergaard (Jakobsen) (PP1) – 45:59	1–2
	1–3	58:27 – Schwarzler (Altmann) (PP1)
Olausson (Clausen) – 58:52	2–3

6 min
Penalties
8 min
27
Shots
26

26 March 2008; 17:00	Netherlands	6–2 (2–0, 2–0, 2–2)	Australia	Vierumäki Ice Rink; Attendance: 57

Game reference

Claudia van Leeuwen
Goalies
Kristy Bruske
Alexandra Stefan
Referee:
(Slovakia) Marcela Štefanovičová
Linesmen:
(Norway) Marlen Vedvik Hansen
(France) Sueva Torribio-Rousselin

Neerdaels (de Graaf) – 02:13	1–0
Admiraal (Ernst) – 03:42	2–0
Schipper (Wielenga) – 23:06	3–0
Schipper (Wielenga) – 29:29	4–0
Boelhouwers (Admiraal) – 41:42	5–0
	5–1	42:13 – Parrington (Farrier)
	5–2	46:10 – Parrington (Bibby, Farrier)
Admiraal (PP1) – 57:10	6–2

12 min
Penalties
8 min
34
Shots
21

26 March 2008; 20:30	Italy	1–6 (0–2, 1–1, 0–3)	North Korea	Vierumäki Ice Rink; Attendance: 84

Game reference

Chiara Traversa
Giulia Mazzocchi
Goalies
Hong Kum Sil
Referee:
(Switzerland) Angela Blasimann
Linesmen:
(Slovakia) Michaela Kúdeľová
(Finland) Johanna Tauriainen

	0–1	14:57 – Choe K.
	0–2	16:48 – Kim S.H. (Kim I.) (SH1)
Viel (Zandegiacomo) (SH1) – 21:12	1–2
	1–3	30:55 – Ryu (Ri S., Han)
	1–4	42:09 – Ri S.
	1–5	45:29 – Kim S.H. (Kim H.)
	1–6	50:22 – Ryu (Ri S., Kim U.)

8 min
Penalties
10 min
17
Shots
26

27 March 2008; 13:30	Denmark	3–0 (2–0, 0–0, 1–0)	Netherlands	Vierumäki Ice Rink; Attendance: 43

Game reference

Nanna Holm Glaas
Goalies
Claudia van Leeuwen
Referee:
(Switzerland) Angela Blasimann
Linesmen:
(Finland) Johanna Tauriainen
(France) Sueva Torribio-Rousselin

Østergaard (Henriksen) – 02:52	1–0
Henriksen (Melby) (PP1) – 14:38	2–0
Jakobsen (Østergaard) – 40:35	3–0

4 min
Penalties
18 min
49
Shots
9

27 March 2008; 17:00	Italy	5–0 (1–0, 1–0, 3–0)	Australia	Vierumäki Ice Rink; Attendance: 58

Game reference

Giulia Mazzocchi
Goalies
Kristy Bruske
Referee:
(Czech Republic) Radka Růžičková
Linesmen:
(Slovakia) Michaela Kúdeľová
(South Korea) Lee Tae Ri

Zandegiacomo (de Rocco) – 14:06	1–0
Kaser (Bazzanella) – 26:18	2–0
Vallazza (de la Forest de Divonne) (PP1) – 52:54	3–0
Rainer (Bettarini) (SH1) – 56:15	4–0
Zandegiacomo (Viel) (SH1) – 56:55	5–0

12 min
Penalties
14 min
55
Shots
16

27 March 2008; 20:30	North Korea	0–4 (0–2, 0–1, 0–1)	Austria	Vierumäki Ice Rink; Attendance: 103

Game reference

Hong Kum Sil
Goalies
Sandra Borschke
Referee:
(Slovakia) Marcela Štefanovičová
Linesmen:
(Czech Republic) Zuzana Arazimová
(Switzerland) Anne Ruth Kuonen

0–1	16:44 – Altmann (Kantor)
0–2	17:30 – Schwarzler (Kantor)
0–3	29:23 – Altmann (Kantor, Schwarzler) (PP1)
0–4	55:42 – Altmann (Kantor, Wirl)

18 min
Penalties
14 min
22
Shots
30

29 March 2008; 13:30	Netherlands	0–4 (0–3, 0–0, 0–1)	North Korea	Vierumäki Ice Rink; Attendance: 51

Game reference

Claudia van Leeuwen
Goalies
Hong Kum Sil
Referee:
(Czech Republic) Radka Růžičková
Linesmen:
(Norway) Marlen Vedvik Hansen
(South Korea) Lee Tae Ri

0–1	04:53 – Choe M. (Kim S.I.)
0–2	05:28 – Ryu (Ri S.)
0–3	09:32 – Ryu (Ri S.)
0–4	59:47 – O (PP1)

16 min
Penalties
4 min
22
Shots
32

29 March 2008; 17:00	Austria	6–4 (3–0, 2–2, 1–2)	Italy	Vierumäki Ice Rink; Attendance: 102

Game reference

Sandra Borschke
Goalies
Chiara Traversa
Giulia Mazzocchi
Referee:
(United States) Erin Blair
Linesmen:
(Slovakia) Michaela Kúdeľová
(France) Sueva Torribio-Rousselin

Altmann (Kantor) (PP1) – 04:28	1–0
Altmann (Kantor) – 08:53	2–0
Schwarzler (Altmann) – 19:39	3–0
Kantor (Altmann) – 20:26	4–0
	4–1	22:56 – Bettarini (da Rugna) (PP1)
Altmann (Kantor) (PP1) – 25:20	5–1
	5–2	26:18 – Bazzanella (de la Forest de Divonne)
Kantor (Schwarzler) (PP2) – 40:16	6–2
	6–3	42:44 – Bazzanella (de la Forest de Divonne)
	6–4	58:27 – Viel (Bettarini) (PP2)

24 min
Penalties
20 min
32
Shots
32

29 March 2008; 20:30	Australia	1–12 (0–6, 1–4, 0–2)	Denmark	Vierumäki Ice Rink; Attendance: 70

Game reference

Kristy Bruske
Alexandra Stefan
Goalies
Kamilla Lund Nielsen
Referee:
(Slovakia) Marcela Štefanovičová
Linesmen:
(Switzerland) Anne Ruth Kuonen
(Finland) Johanna Tauriainen

	0–1	00:36 – Henriksen (Melby, Østergaard)
	0–2	02:21 – Henriksen (Jakobsen, Østergaard)
	0–3	08:24 – Jakobsen (Melby)
	0–4	10:05 – Olausson (Hansen)
	0–5	12:13 – Henriksen (Densing) (PP1)
	0–6	17:25 – Jakobsen (Melby) (SH1)
Cameron (Stock, Cummings) – 20:51	1–6
	1–7	21:00 – Svendsen (Louring)
	1–8	36:28 – Henriksen (Jokobsen, Densing)
	1–9	36:49 – Olausson (Leszkowicz)
	1–10	39:14 – Olausson (Jakobsen, Østergaard)
	1–11	48:42 – Henriksen (Olausson, Densing) (PP2)
	1–12	49:38 – Henriksen (Østergaard, Jakobsen) (PP1)

18 min
Penalties
6 min
20
Shots
52

30 March 2008; 12:00	Austria	3–2 (2–0, 0–0, 1–2)	Netherlands	Vierumäki Ice Rink; Attendance: 42

Game reference

Nina Geyer
Goalies
Claudia van Leeuwen
Referee:
(United States) Erin Blair
Linesmen:
(Czech Republic) Zuzana Arazimová
(Slovakia) Michaela Kúdeľová

Ernst (Reichel) – 09:16	1–0
Rothbock (Janach, Oberhuber) – 16:51	2–0
	2–1	43:54 – Elderhorst (Boelhouwers) (PP2)
Schwarzler (Altmann) (PP1) – 53:23	3–1
	3–2	56:57 – Admiraal (Wielenga, Boelhouwers)

6 min
Penalties
8 min
24
Shots
26

30 March 2008; 15:30	North Korea	10–0 (2–0, 4–0, 4–0)	Australia	Vierumäki Ice Rink; Attendance: 38

Game reference

Hong Kum Sil
Goalies
Alexandra Stefan
Referee:
(Czech Republic) Radka Růžičková
Linesmen:
(Norway) Marlen Vedvik Hansen
(South Korea) Lee Tae Ri

Ri S. – 08:17	1–0
O – 15:49	2–0
Kim I. (Choe K.) – 28:18	3–0
Ri S. – 29:11	4–0
Kim S.I. – 30:52	5–0
Choe K. (O) – 32:20	6–0
Choe K. – 40:21	7–0
O (Ri S.) – 51:54	8–0
Choe K. – 57:08	9–0
Kim H. (Kim S.I.) (PP1) – 59:36	10–0

4 min
Penalties
10 min
28
Shots
15

30 March 2008; 19:00	Denmark	3–2 (0–1, 2–0, 1–1)	Italy	Vierumäki Ice Rink; Attendance: 63

Game reference

Ninna Holm Glaas
Goalies
Giulia Mazzocchi
Referee:
(Switzerland) Angela Blasimann
Linesmen:
(Switzerland) Anne Ruth Kuonen
(France) Sueva Torribio-Rousselin

	0–1	10:42 – de la Forest de Divonne (Bazzanella)
Jakobsen (Henriksen) (PP1) – 23:28	1–1
Densing (Henriksen) (PP1) – 39:04	2–1
	2–2	46:35 – Zandegiacomo (Bettarini, de Rocco) (PP1)
Jakobsen (Henriksen, Østergaard) – 58:26	3–2

10 min
Penalties
10 min
23
Shots
30

=== Awards and statistics ===
==== Scoring leaders ====
Pos	Player	Country	GP	G	A	Pts	+/−	PIM
1	Denise Altmann	Austria	5	10	5	15	+9	8
2	Marie Linander Henriksen	Denmark	5	8	6	14	+10	0
3	Josefine Jakobsen	Denmark	5	6	7	13	+10	2
4	Eva Schwarzler	Austria	5	6	5	11	+7	8
5	Esther Kantor	Austria	5	2	8	10	+7	2
6	Ri Sol Gyong	North Korea	5	4	5	9	+8	4
7	Henriette Funch Østergaard	Denmark	5	3	6	9	+8	2
8	Saskia Admiraal	Netherlands	5	4	1	5	+3	4
8	Choe Kum Son	North Korea	5	4	1	5	+5	6
8	Marie Olausson	Denmark	5	4	1	5	+4	2

GP = Games played; G = Goals; A = Assists; Pts = Points; +/− = P Plus–minus; PIM = Penalties In Minutes
Source: IIHF.com

==== Goaltending leaders ====
(minimum 40% team's total ice time)

Pos	Player	Country	TOI	GA	GAA	Sv%	SO
1	Nanna Holm Glaas	Denmark	240:00	6	1.50	93.55	1
2	Nina Geyer	Austria	120:00	4	2.00	93.44	0
3	Sandra Borschke	Austria	180:00	6	2.00	92.59	1
4	Hong Kum Sil	North Korea	275:33	9	1.96	91.74	2
5	Claudia van Leeuwen	Netherlands	304:29	15	2.96	90.38	0

TOI = Time on ice (minutes:seconds); GA = Goals against; GAA = Goals against average; Sv% = Save percentage; SO = Shutouts
Source: IIHF.com

==== Directorate Awards ====
- Goaltender: (Austria) Sandra Borschke
- Defenseman: (Italy) Linda de Rocco
- Forward: (Austria) Denise Altmann

Source: IIHF.com

== Division III ==
The Division III tournament was played in Miskolc, Hungary, at the Miskolc Ice Hall, from 6 to 12 April 2008.

Pos	Team	Pld	W	OTW	OTL	L	GF	GA	GD	Pts	Promotion or relegation
1	Great Britain	5	4	1	0	0	29	7	+22	14	Promoted to the 2009 Division II
2	Slovenia	5	4	0	1	0	27	6	+21	13	
3	Croatia	5	2	0	1	2	12	20	−8	7	
4	Belgium	5	2	0	0	3	12	16	−4	6	
5	Hungary (H)	5	1	0	0	4	4	20	−16	3	
6	South Korea	5	0	1	0	4	7	22	−15	2	Relegated to the 2011 Division IV

Source: IIHF
(H) Host

All times are local (Central European Summer Time – UTC+2).

6 April 2008; 12:30	Great Britain	6–0 (3–0, 2–0, 1–0)	South Korea	Miskolc Arena; Attendance: 100

Game reference

Kelly Herring
Goalies
Shin So-jung
Referee:
(United States) Kristine Langley
Linesmen:
(Netherlands) Vivienne Brekelmans
(Slovakia) Magdaléna Čerhitová

Kavanagh (Taylor, Turner) – 01:56	1–0
Bicknell (Henry) (PP) – 05:31	2–0
Wiggins (Carr, Aldridge) – 11:54	3–0
Kavanagh (Turner) – 22:27	4–0
Turner (Taylor) – 31:46	5–0
Maitland (Oldfield, Glenn) – 53:35	6–0

14 min
Penalties
6 min
46
Shots
5

6 April 2008; 16:00	Belgium	2–5 (0–2, 1–2, 1–1)	Slovenia	Miskolc Arena; Attendance: 100

Game reference

Kirsten Schönwetter
Goalies
Katja Pavlinek
Referee:
(Japan) Kotoe Nashida
Linesmen:
(Estonia) Kaire Leet
(Hungary) Zsuzsanna Sándor

	0–1	06:38 – Rošar (Pren) (PP1)
	0–2	11:35 – Rošar (Pren) (PP1)
	0–3	31:03 – Tominc (Rošar) (PP1)
Verpoest – 34:57	1–3
	1–4	35:18 – Pren
Morel de Westgaver – 45:55	2–4
	2–5	48:40 – Rošar (PP2)

24 min
Penalties
8 min
13
Shots
37

6 April 2008; 19:30	Croatia	2–1 (0–0, 1–1, 1–0)	Hungary	Miskolc Arena; Attendance: 450

Game reference

Petra Belobrk
Goalies
Monika Gyömber
Referee:
(Czech Republic) Ludmila Nelibová
Linesmen:
(Finland) Tiina Pennanen
(United States) Andrea Weissman

	0–1	34:54 – Pintér (Szlaby) (PP1)
Krušelj-Posavec (Vicković) (PP1) – 35:51	1–1
Krušelj-Posavec (Vicković) – 47:13	2–1

14 min
Penalties
28 min
25
Shots
14

7 April 2008; 12:30	Great Britain	4–1 (0–0, 2–1, 2–0)	Belgium	Miskolc Arena; Attendance: 50

Game reference

Kelly Herring
Goalies
Kirsten Schönwetter
Referee:
(Slovakia) Mária Zemiaková
Linesmen:
(Kazakhstan) Irina Mogilnikova
(Hungary) Zsuzsanna Sándor

Bicknell (Byrne) – 21:09	1–0
Bicknell (Byrne) – 37:35	2–0
	2–1	38:22 – de Backer
Kavanagh (Aldrdge, Turner) – 52:26	3–1
Henry (Palmer) (PP1) – 57:43	4–1

10 min
Penalties
22 min
46
Shots
6

7 April 2008; 16:00	South Korea	3–2 GWS (1–1, 0–0, 1–1) (OT: 0–0) (SO: 1–0)	Croatia	Miskolc Arena; Attendance: 80

Game reference

Shin So-jung
Goalies
Petra Belobrk
Referee:
(Japan) Kotoe Nashida
Linesmen:
(Netherlands) Vivienne Brekelmans
(United States) Andrea Weissman

Lee K. (Hwangbo) – 05:21	1–0
	1–1	06:44 – Krušelj-Posavec (Mondecar) (SH1)
Hwangbo – 43:47	2–1
	2–2	54:43 – Širanović (Krušelj-Posavec)

Hwangbo
Shootout

8 min
Penalties
10 min
9
Shots
33

7 April 2008; 19:30	Slovenia	5–0 (1–0, 3–0, 1–0)	Hungary	Miskolc Arena; Attendance: 350

Game reference

Ksenija Božnar
Goalies
Eszter Kökényesi
Referee:
(United States) Kristine Langley
Linesmen:
(Slovakia) Magdaléna Čerhitová
(Estonia) Kaire Leet

Rošar (Pren, Tominc) – 09:45	1–0
Vakaričič (Rošar, Pren) – 22:35	2–0
Pren – 38:07	3–0
Rošar (Pren, Vakaričič) – 38:28	4–0
Rošar (Tominc) – 54:01	5–0

14 min
Penalties
12 min
42
Shots
9

9 April 2008; 12:30	Slovenia	8–0 (2–0, 3–0, 3–0)	South Korea	Miskolc Arena; Attendance: 100

Game reference

Katja Pavlinek
Goalies
Shin So-jung
Referee:
(Czech Republic) Ludmila Nelibová
Linesmen:
(Kazakhstan) Irina Mogilnikova
(Finland) Tiina Pennanen

Rošar (Pren) – 05:51	1–0
Rošar (Pren, Krajšek) – 18:22	2–0
Rošar (Tominc, Pren) – 24:20	3–0
Rošar (Pren) – 25:42	4–0
Rošar (Pren) – 38:36	5–0
Rošar (Tominc, Pren) – 42:18	6–0
Pren (SH1) – 54:28	7–0
Rošar (Pren) – 56:41	8–0

10 min
Penalties
8 min
55
Shots
9

9 April 2008; 16:00	Great Britain	8–4 (3–1, 3–1, 2–2)	Croatia	Miskolc Arena; Attendance: 80

Game reference

Kelly Herring
Laura Saunders
Goalies
Petra Belobrk
Referee:
(Slovakia) Mária Zemiaková
Linesmen:
(Netherlands) Vivienne Brekelmans
(Hungary) Zsuzsanna Sándor

von Haselberg-Palyvou (Wiggins) – 03:04	1–0
Taylor (Kavanagh) – 04:21	2–0
	2–1	09:18 – Krušelj-Posavec (PP1)
Taylor (Turner) – 18:30	3–1
	3–2	29:16 – Krušelj-Posavec (Adamović) (PP1)
Palmer (Byrne, Maitland) (PP1) – 31:29	4–2
Turner (Kavanagh, Ledger) – 35:25	5–2
Oldfield (Maitland) – 35:44	6–2
Wiggins (Carr) – 43:28	7–2
Kavanagh (Halliwell) (PP1) – 44:07	8–2
	8–3	44:58 – Krušelj-Posavec (Filipec) (PP1)
	8–4	53:15 – Pack (Matić)

18 min
Penalties
12 min
39
Shots
18

9 April 2008; 19:30	Belgium	4–1 (1–0, 1–1, 2–0)	Hungary	Miskolc Arena; Attendance: 400

Game reference

Kirsten Schönwetter
Goalies
Monika Gyömber
Referee:
(Japan) Kotoe Nashida
Linesmen:
(Estonia) Kaire Leet
(United States) Andrea Weissman

Lotin (Frère) – 12:44	1–0
de Backer – 21:46	2–0
	2–1	32:22 – Tóvölgyi (Dettrich, Pintér) (PP2)
de Decker (Morel de Westcaver) – 54:27	3–1
Verpoest (de Decker, Morel de Westcaver) – 56:52	4–1

12 min
Penalties
4 min
18
Shots
37

11 April 2008; 12:30	Croatia	1–7 (0–4, 0–1, 1–2)	Slovenia	Miskolc Arena; Attendance: 50

Game reference

Petra Belobrk
Goalies
Ksenija Božnar
Referee:
(United States) Kristine Langley
Linesmen:
(Slovakia) Magdaléna Čerhitová
(United States) Andrea Weissman

	0–1	06:57 – Vakaričič (Tominc) (SH1)
	0–2	11:25 – Manfreda (Zuljan)
	0–3	14:07 – Tominc (Lahovec)
	0–4	14:24 – Lahajnar (Kraner)
	0–5	22:40 – Rošar (Pren)
	0–6	49:55 – Tominc (Rošar, Vakaričič)
Krušelj-Posavec – 50:48	1–6
	1–7	55:51 – Haus (Deisinger)

4 min
Penalties
24 min
31
Shots
36

11 April 2008; 16:00	South Korea	3–4 (2–1, 1–3, 0–0)	Belgium	Miskolc Arena; Attendance: 90

Game reference

Shin So-jung
Goalies
Kirsten Schönwetter
Referee:
(Slovakia) Mária Zemiaková
Linesmen:
(Estonia) Kaire Leet
(Finland) Tiina Pennanen

	0–1	04:31 – Frère (de Decker) (PP1)
Hwangbo (Han S.) – 05:53	1–1
Hwangbo – 17:22	2–1
Han J. (Lee K.) – 20:35	3–1
	3–2	28:50 – Bosmans (Pittoors, Baeck)
	3–3	37:16 – Bosmans (Frère)
	3–4	39:13 – de Decker (Bosmans, Verpoest)

12 min
Penalties
14 min
25
Shots
36

11 April 2008; 19:30	Hungary	0–8 (0–3, 0–3, 0–2)	Great Britain	Miskolc Arena

Game reference

Monika Gyömber
Goalies
Kelly Herring
Referee:
(Czech Republic) Ludmila Nelibová
Linesmen:
(Netherlands) Vivienne Brekelmans
(Kazakhstan) Irina Mogilnikova

0–1	01:22 – Taylor (Turner)
0–2	04:05 – Turner (Kavanagh, Ledger)
0–3	15:41 – Lamb (Wiggins)
0–4	21:11 – Bicknell (Palmer)
0–5	24:35 – Kavanagh (Wiggins) (PP1)
0–6	27:45 – Taylor (Kavanagh)
0–7	51:32 – Maitland (Carr, von Haselberg-Palyvou) (PP1)
0–8	55:43 – Wiggins (Aldridge, Henry)

12 min
Penalties
4 min
4
Shots
62

12 April 2008; 12:30	Belgium	1–3 (0–0, 1–2, 0–1)	Croatia	Miskolc Arena; Attendance: 50

Game reference

Kirsten Schönwetter
Goalies
Petra Belobrk
Referee:
(Japan) Kotoe Nashida
Linesmen:
(Kazakhstan) Irina Mogilnikova
(Finland) Tiina Pennanen

	0–1	23:59 – Krušelj-Posavec (PP1)
	0–2	32:35 – Krušelj-Posavec (Filipec) (PP1)
Verpoest (de Decker) (PP1) – 39:27	1–2
	1–3	51:17 – Krušelj-Posavec (Vicković)

16 min
Penalties
14 min
17
Shots
34

12 April 2008; 16:00	Slovenia	2–3 GWS (1–0, 0–1, 1–1) (OT: 0–0) (SO: 0–1)	Great Britain	Miskolc Arena; Attendance: 250

Game reference

Ksenija Božnar
Goalies
Kelly Herring
Referee:
(United States) Kristine Langley
Linesmen:
(Estonia) Kaire Leet
(Hungary) Zsuzsanna Sándor

Rošar (Krajšek, Pren) (PP2) – 12:58	1–0
	1–1	28:41 – Henry (Wiggins)
Pren (PS) – 44:11	2–1
	2–2	52:56 – Taylor (Kavanagh, Turner) (PP1)

Shootout
Taylor
8 min
Penalties
8 min
18
Shots
54

12 April 2008; 19:30	Hungary	2–1 (0–0, 0–1, 2–0)	South Korea	Miskolc Arena; Attendance: 600

Game reference

Monika Gyömber
Goalies
Shin So-jung
Referee:
(Czech Republic) Ludmila Nelibová
Linesmen:
(Slovakia) Magdaléna Čerhitová
(United States) Andrea Weissman

	0–1	38:05 – Han J. (Hwangbo)
Tóvölgyi (Brgles) – 41:56	1–1
Fejős (Pintér) – 59:07	2–1

14 min
Penalties
4 min
29
Shots
17

=== Awards and statistics ===
==== Scoring leaders ====
Pos	Player	Country	GP	G	A	Pts	+/−	PIM
1	Jasmina Rošar	Slovenia	5	15	3	18	+13	8
2	Pia Pren	Slovenia	5	4	14	18	+15	4
3	Diana Krušelj-Posavec	Croatia	5	10	1	11	−6	4
4	Beth Kavanagh	Great Britain	5	5	5	10	+9	0
5	Emily Turner	Great Britain	5	3	6	9	+10	2
6	Angela Taylor	Great Britain	5	6	2	8	+9	6
7	Danila Tominc	Slovenia	5	3	5	8	+17	6
8	Katherine Wiggins	Great Britain	5	3	4	7	+6	2
9	Hwangbo Young	South Korea	5	4	2	6	−6	6
10	Nicola Bicknell	Great Britain	5	4	1	5	+2	2

GP = Games played; G = Goals; A = Assists; Pts = Points; +/− = P Plus–minus; PIM = Penalties In Minutes
Source: IIHF.com

==== Goaltending leaders ====
(minimum 40% team's total ice time)

Pos	Player	Country	TOI	GA	GAA	Sv%	SO
1	Ksenija Božnar	Slovenia	185:00	4	1.30	95.74	1
2	Kirsten Schönwetter	Belgium	299:26	16	3.21	91.16	0
3	Shin So-jung	South Korea	303:40	22	4.35	88.94	0
4	Monika Gyömber	Hungary	210:55	13	3.70	86.32	0
5	Kelly Herring	Great Britain	209:03	5	1.44	85.71	0

TOI = Time on ice (minutes:seconds); GA = Goals against; GAA = Goals against average; Sv% = Save percentage; SO = Shutouts
Source: IIHF.com

==== Directorate Awards ====
- Goaltender: (Slovenia) Ksenija Božnar
- Defenseman: (Croatia) Diana Krušelj-Posavec
- Forward: (United Kingdom) Angela Taylor
- MVP: (Slovenia) Jasmina Rošar

Source: IIHF.com

== Division IV ==
The Division IV tournament was played in Miercurea Ciuc, Romania, at Lajos Vákár Ice Hall, from 23 to 29 March 2008.

Pos	Team	Pld	W	OTW	OTL	L	GF	GA	GD	Pts	Relegation
1	Iceland (Note: In the end, Iceland was not promoted as 2009 Division III tournament was cancelled.)	5	5	0	0	0	30	5	+25	15	
2	New Zealand	5	4	0	0	1	37	9	+28	12	
3	Romania (H)	5	2	0	1	2	25	16	+9	7	
4	Estonia	5	2	0	0	3	11	17	−6	6	
5	South Africa	5	1	1	0	3	15	24	−9	5	
6	Turkey	5	0	0	0	5	3	50	−47	0	Relegated to the 2011 Division V

Source: IIHF
(H) Host
Notes:

All times are local (Eastern European Time – UTC+2).

23 March 2008; 13:30	New Zealand	9–1 (1–1, 5–0, 3–0)	South Africa	Lajos Vákár Ice Hall

Game reference

23 March 2008; 17:00	Turkey	1–8 (0–3, 1–1, 0–4)	Estonia	Lajos Vákár Ice Hall

Game reference

23 March 2008; 20:30	Romania	3–4 (1–2, 1–1, 1–1)	Iceland	Lajos Vákár Ice Hall

Game reference

24 March 2008; 13:30	South Africa	1–2 (1–1, 0–0, 0–1)	Estonia	Lajos Vákár Ice Hall

Game reference

24 March 2008; 17:00	Iceland	9–0 (3–0, 4–0, 2–0)	Turkey	Lajos Vákár Ice Hall

Game reference

24 March 2008; 20:30	Romania	2–7 (0–2, 2–4, 0–1)	New Zealand	Lajos Vákár Ice Hall

Game reference

26 March 2008; 13:30	South Africa	1–9 (0–5, 0–2, 1–2)	Iceland	Lajos Vákár Ice Hall

Game reference

26 March 2008; 17:00	Romania	9–1 (1–0, 3–1, 5–0)	Turkey	Lajos Vákár Ice Hall

Game reference

26 March 2008; 20:30	New Zealand	4–1 (1–0, 0–0, 3–1)	Estonia	Lajos Vákár Ice Hall

Game reference

27 March 2008; 13:30	Iceland	5–1 (2–0, 2–0, 1–1)	New Zealand	Lajos Vákár Ice Hall

Game reference

27 March 2008; 17:00	Turkey	1–8 (0–3, 0–3, 1–2)	South Africa	Lajos Vákár Ice Hall

Game reference

27 March 2008; 20:30	Estonia	0–8 (0–3, 0–2, 0–3)	Romania	Lajos Vákár Ice Hall

Game reference

29 March 2008; 13:30	Estonia	0–3 (0–2, 0–0, 0–1)	Iceland	Lajos Vákár Ice Hall

Game reference

29 March 2008; 17:00	New Zealand	16–0 (6–0, 7–0, 3–0)	Turkey	Lajos Vákár Ice Hall

Game reference

29 March 2008; 20:30	South Africa	4–3 (OT) (3–2, 0–1, 0–0) (1–0)	Romania	Lajos Vákár Ice Hall

Game reference

=== Awards and statistics ===
==== Scoring leaders ====
Pos	Player	Country	GP	G	A	Pts	+/−	PIM
1	Tara Tissink	New Zealand	5	10	7	17	+16	6
2	Magdolna Dobondi	Romania	5	7	9	16	+8	0
3	Csilla Ilyés	Romania	5	6	7	13	+9	4
4	Flosrún Jóhannesdóttir	Iceland	5	6	5	11	+12	2
5	Sheree Haslemore	New Zealand	5	3	8	11	+11	4
6	Kiri Langford	New Zealand	5	6	4	10	+9	4
7	Angelique Mawson	New Zealand	5	3	7	10	+9	4
7	Ibolya Sándor	Romania	5	3	7	10	+8	0
9	Megan Gilchrist	New Zealand	5	3	6	9	+14	6
10	Sigrún Árnadóttir	Iceland	5	4	4	8	+11	18

GP = Games played; G = Goals; A = Assists; Pts = Points; +/− = P Plus–minus; PIM = Penalties In Minutes
Source: IIHF.com

==== Goaltending leaders ====
(minimum 40% team's total ice time)

Pos	Player	Country	TOI	GA	GAA	Sv%	SO
1	Karítas Halldórsdóttir	Iceland	240:00	5	1.25	95.15	1
2	Monika Janis	Estonia	271:24	14	3.10	90.07	0
3	Mary McCutcheon	New Zealand	145:12	2	0.83	90.00	1
4	Angelique Otto	South Africa	203:29	7	2.06	89.39	0
5	Andreea Herescu	Romania	243:06	12	2.96	88.12	0

TOI = Time on ice (minutes:seconds); GA = Goals against; GAA = Goals against average; Sv% = Save percentage; SO = Shutouts
Source: IIHF.com

==== Directorate Awards ====
- Goaltender: (Iceland) Karítas Halldórsdóttir
- Defenseman: (New Zealand) Annabelle Lewis
- Forward: (Romania) Magdolna Dobondi

Source: IIHF.com
