= Vakar =

Vakar may refer to:

== People ==
- Gertrude Vakar (1904–1973), Russian translator
- Lajos Vákár (1910–1993), Hungarian and Romanian ice hockey player
- Nicholas Vakar (1894–1970), Belarusian author

== Other uses ==
- Lajos Vákár Ice Hall, arena in Romania
