= Ice hockey at the 2010 Winter Olympics – Women's tournament =

Women's ice hockey at the XXI Olympic Winter Games
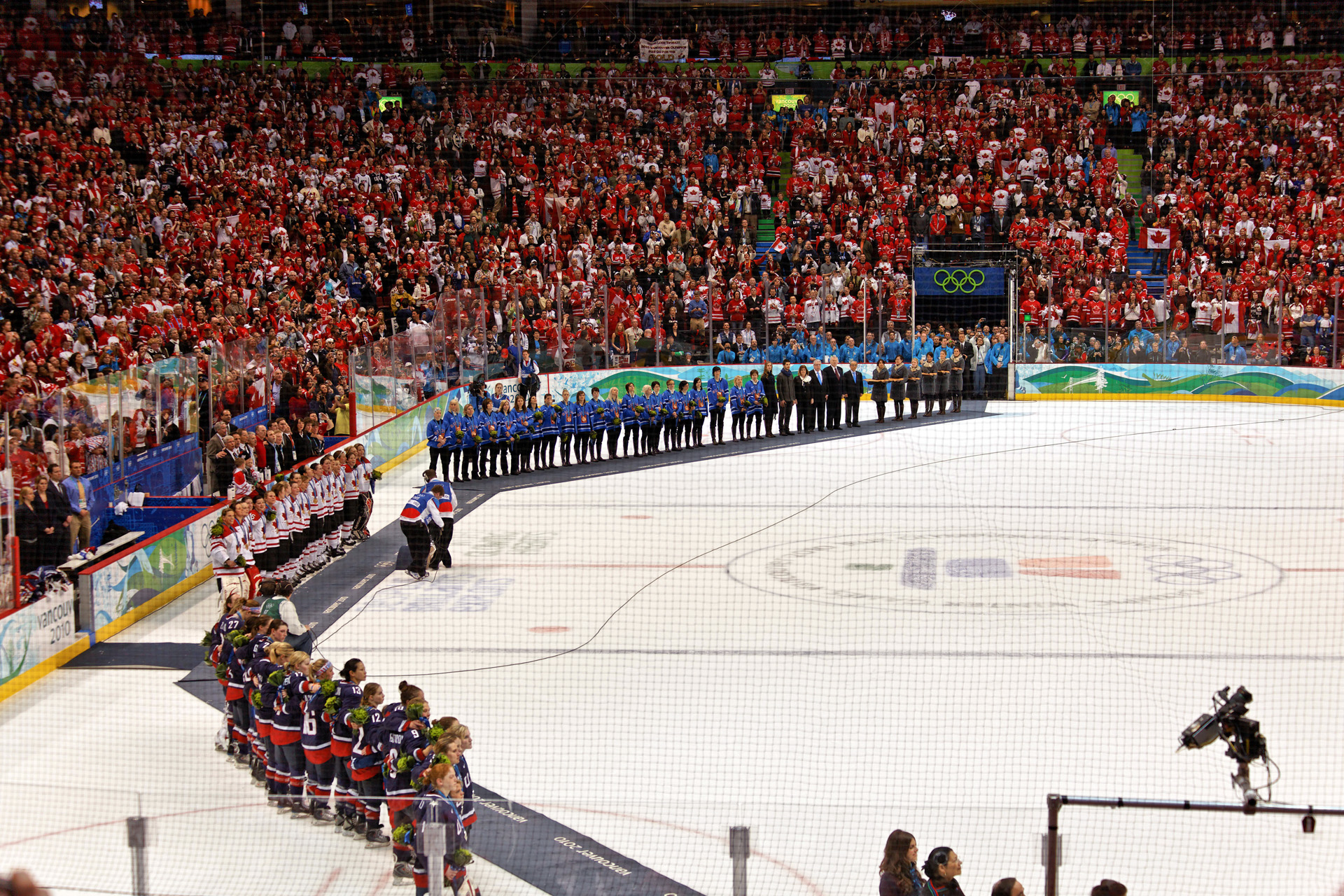
- Medal ceremony
- Venues: General Motors Place (renamed Canada Hockey Place during the game due to the no-commercial policy); UBC Thunderbird Arena
- Dates: 13–25 February 2010

Medalists
1st place, gold medalist(s)		Canada (3rd title)
2nd place, silver medalist(s)		United States
3rd place, bronze medalist(s)		Finland

The women's tournament in ice hockey at the 2010 Winter Olympics was held in Vancouver, British Columbia, Canada from February 13 to 25. Eight teams competed, seeded into two groups. Canada won the final by a score of 2–0 over the United States, who were awarded silver. The bronze medal game was won by Finland with a 3–2 victory over Sweden in overtime.

The tournament consisted of 20 games: 12 in the preliminary round (teams play the other teams in their own group); 4 final classification games; 2 semifinal games; 1 bronze medal game; and 1 final.

The tournament had a total attendance of 162,419, an average of 8,120 spectators per game, making it the most attended IIHF-run women's hockey tournament of all-time.

== Rosters ==
Group A

- Canada (roster)
- Slovakia (roster)
- Sweden (roster)
- Switzerland (roster)

Group B

- China (roster)
- Finland (roster)
- Russia (roster)
- United States (roster)

== First round ==
=== Group A ===
Team	Pld	W	OTW	OTL	L	GF	GA	GD	Pts	Qualification
Canada	3	3	0	0	0	41	2	+39	9	Semifinals
Sweden	3	2	0	0	1	10	15	−5	6	Semifinals
Switzerland	3	1	0	0	2	6	15	−9	3	5–8th classification
Slovakia	3	0	0	0	3	4	29	−25	0	5–8th classification

Source: ESPN

All times are local (UTC−8).

13 February 2010; 12:00	Sweden	3–0 (1–0, 1–0, 1–0)	Switzerland	UBC Winter Sports Centre, Vancouver; Attendance: 5,222

Game reference

Kim Martin
Goalies
Florence Schelling
Referee:
Leah Wrazidlo (United States)

Rundqvist (Udén Johansson, Svedin Thunström) – 12:31	1–0
Enström (Östberg, Myrén) – 31:35	2–0
Udén Johansson (Nevalainen) – 41:50	3–0

14 min
Penalties
6 min
34
Shots
16

13 February 2010; 17:00	Canada	18–0 (7–0, 6–0, 5–0)	Slovakia	Canada Hockey Place, Vancouver; Attendance: 16,496

Game reference

Kim St-Pierre
Goalies
Zuzana Tomčíková
Referee:
Joy Tottman (Great Britain)

Irwin (Vaillancourt, Johnston) – 1:39	1–0
Bonhomme (Hefford, MacLeod) – 3:06	2–0
Agosta (Ouellette, Wickenheiser) (PP) – 5:38	3–0
MacLeod (Bonhomme, Ouellette) – 8:21	4–0
Agosta (Kellar, Sostorics) – 11:34	5–0
Kingsbury (Piper, Apps) – 15:09	6–0
Sostorics (Hefford, Agosta) – 16:20	7–0
Vaillancourt (Johnston) – 23:42	8–0
Poulin (PP) – 27:21	9–0
Agosta (Hefford, Ouellette) – 30:19	10–0
Hefford (Wickenheiser) (SH) – 32:00	11–0
Ouellette (Apps, Sostorics) (SH) – 32:44	12–0
MacLeod (Poulin, Sostorics) – 36:42	13–0
Hefford (Agosta, MacLeod) – 44:23	14–0
Irwin (Vaillancourt, Ward) – 44:37	15–0
Piper (Wickenheiser) – 46:54	16–0
Hefford (Ouellette, Kellar) – 51:03	17–0
Kingsbury (Botterill) – 52:52	18–0

10 min
Penalties
12 min
67
Shots
9

15 February 2010; 14:30	Switzerland	1–10 (0–2, 1–3, 0–5)	Canada	UBC Winter Sports Centre, Vancouver; Attendance: 5,413

Game reference

Florence Schelling (out 51:55)
Dominique Slongo (in 51:55)
Goalies
Shannon Szabados
Referee:
Nicole Hertrich (Germany)

	0–1	6:27 – Apps (Kingsbury, Piper) (PP)
	0–2	14:25 – Vaillancourt (Johnston)
	0–3	22:19 – Piper (Wickenheiser)
	0–4	28:08 – Agosta (Ward, Ouellette)
	0–5	31:15 – Agosta (Ouellette, Hefford)
Leimgruber (Lehmann, S. Marty) – 39:46	1–5
	1–6	40:54 – Hefford (Wickenheiser) (SH)
	1–7	49:08 – Ward
	1–8	49:27 – Poulin
	1–9	50:43 – Johnston (Vaillancourt, Kellar)
	1–10	51:55 – Wickenheiser (Piper, Apps)

8 min
Penalties
10 min
12
Shots
62

15 February 2010; 19:00	Sweden	6–2 (3–2, 1–0, 2–0)	Slovakia	UBC Winter Sports Centre, Vancouver; Attendance: 5,323

Game reference

Sara Grahn
Goalies
Zuzana Tomčíková
Referee:
Aina Høve (Norway)

Winberg (Holmlöv, Holst) (PP) – 5:01	1–0
	1–1	9:52 – Džurňáková (Babonyová, Herichová)
Winberg (Eliasson, Holmlöv) (PP) – 12:11	2–1
	2–2	13:29 – Čupková (Čulíková, Kapustová)
Asserholt (Myrén, Östberg) – 16:07	3–2
Winberg (E. Andersson) – 29:07	4–2
Holmlöv (Holst, G. Andersson) (PP) – 46:08	5–2
Winberg (Nordin) – 53:20	6–2

10 min
Penalties
16 min
48
Shots
16

17 February 2010; 14:30	Canada	13–1 (5–0, 7–0, 1–1)	Sweden	UBC Winter Sports Centre, Vancouver; Attendance: 5,483

Game reference

Kim St-Pierre (out 40:00) / Charline Labonté (in 40:00)
Goalies
Kim Martin (out 28:47) / Sara Grahn (in 28:47)
Referee:
Leah Wrazidlo (United States)

Agosta (Piper, Ouellette) – 06:58	1–0
Poulin (Agosta, Wickenheiser) – 09:16	2–0
Piper (Wickenheiser, Sostorics) – 13:00	3–0
Vaillancourt (Johnston, Sostorics) – 15:27	4–0
Bonhomme (Agosta) – 15:57	5–0
Agosta (Hefford) – 21:06	6–0
Hefford (Ouellette, Kellar) – 25:36	7–0
Wickenheiser (Apps) – 25:14	8–0
Apps (Irwin, Piper) – 26:13	9–0
Agosta (Ouellette) (PP) – 27:59	10–0
Piper (Wickenheiser) – 29:17	11–0
Irwin (Vaillancourt, Ward) (PP) – 31:43	12–0
Apps (MacLeod, Wickenheiser) – 47:43	13–0
	13–1	52:16 – Timglas (Jordansson, Rooth) (PP)

8 min
Penalties
16 min
52
Shots
13

17 February 2010; 19:00	Slovakia	2–5 (1–0, 0–1, 1–4)	Switzerland	UBC Winter Sports Centre, Vancouver; Attendance: 5,272

Game reference

Zuzana Tomčíková
Goalies
Florence Schelling
Referee:
Ulla Sipilä (Finland)

Čulíková (Čupková) – 7:10	1–0
	1–1	35:39 – S. Marty
Čulíková (Kapustová, Čupková) – 40:19	2–1
	2–2	50:35 – S. Marty (Nussbaum)
	2–3	51:18 – Benz (Meier, Schelling)
	2–4	56:28 – Lehmann (Leimgruber) (SH)
	2–5	58:25 – S. Marty (Hafliger, Benz)

12 min
Penalties
12 min
33
Shots
45

=== Group B ===
Team	Pld	W	OTW	OTL	L	GF	GA	GD	Pts	Qualification
United States	3	3	0	0	0	31	1	+30	9	Semifinals
Finland	3	2	0	0	1	7	8	−1	6	Semifinals
Russia	3	1	0	0	2	3	19	−16	3	5–8th classification
China	3	0	0	0	3	3	16	−13	0	5–8th classification

Source: ESPN

All times are local (UTC−8).

14 February 2010; 12:00	United States	12–1 (5–0, 3–0, 4–1)	China	UBC Winter Sports Centre, Vancouver; Attendance: 5,278

Game reference

Molly Schaus (out 52:00) / Brianne McLaughlin (in 52:00)
Goalies
Shi Yao
Referee:
Ulla Sipilä (Finland)

Ruggiero – 2:50	1–0
Stack (Chu) – 9:56	2–0
Potter (M. Lamoureux) – 14:22	3–0
Duggan (Stack, Darwitz) (PP) – 17:40	4–0
Potter (Knight, M. Lamoureux) – 18:01	5–0
Potter (Engstrom, Chesson) (PP) – 21:18	6–0
Chesson (Marvin, Chu) – 23:46	7–0
J. Lamoureux (Thatcher) – 39:39	8–0
Duggan (Marvin, Potter) – 43:59	9–0
Engstrom (Potter, M. Lamoureux) – 50:43	10–0
Darwitz (M. Lamoureux, Weiland) – 54:43	11–0
	11–1	57:39 – Jin (Ma, Sun) (PP)
Chu (Darwitz) – 59:21	12–1

8 min
Penalties
12 min
61
Shots
7

14 February 2010; 16:30	Finland	5–1 (1–1, 2–0, 2–0)	Russia	UBC Winter Sports Centre, Vancouver; Attendance: 5,275

Game reference

Noora Räty
Goalies
Irina Gashennikova
Referee:
Mary Anne Gage (Canada)
Linesmen:
Heather Richardson (Canada)
Kerry Rumble (Canada)

	0–1	6:11 – Vafina (Burina) (PP)
Sirviö (Saarinen, Välimäki) (PP2) – 9:30	1–1
Voutilainen (Rantamäki) – 23:59	2–1
Hovi (Hiirikoski) – 37:36	3–1
Tikkinen (S. Tuominen, Karvinen) – 42:25	4–1
Tikkinen (Pelttari, Karvinen) (PP) – 49:32	5–1

14 min
Penalties
12 min
34
Shots
14

16 February 2010; 14:30	Russia	0–13 (0–5, 0–7, 0–1)	United States	UBC Winter Sports Centre, Vancouver; Attendance: 5,365

Game reference

Anna Prugova (out 31:00)
Mariya Onolbayeva (in 31:00)
Goalies
Jessie Vetter
Referee:
Nicole Hertrich (Germany)
Linesmen:
Annica Flöden (Sweden)
Heather Richardson (Canada)

0–1	2:19 – M. Lamoureux (J. Lamoureux, Stack)
0–2	5:48 – Potter (Knight) (SH)
0–3	9:54 – Thatcher (Potter, Knight)
0–4	12:57 – Cahow (Stack, Darwitz) (PP)
0–5	15:56 – Potter (Knight) (PP)
0–6	20:34 – Ruggiero (Chu, Darwitz) (PP)
0–7	23:16 – Stack (M. Lamoureux) (PP)
0–8	26:01 – J. Lamoureux (Darwitz)
0–9	27:50 – Darwitz (Cahow) (PP)
0–10	31:00 – Darwitz (Knight) (SH)
0–11	31:46 – Potter (Thatcher, Bellamy)
0–12	33:32 – Engstrom (Chesson) (PP)
0–13	41:05 – Chesson (Stack) (PP)

16 min
Penalties
10 min
7
Shots
34

16 February 2010; 19:00	Finland	2–1 (0–1, 2–0, 0–0)	China	UBC Winter Sports Centre, Vancouver; Attendance: 5,317

Game reference

Noora Räty
Goalies
Shi Yao
Referee:
Joy Tottman (Great Britain)

	0–1	18:10 – Wang L. (SH)
Rantamäki (Pelttari, Lindstedt) (PP) – 29:13	1–1
Hovi – 34:02	2–1

10 min
Penalties
20 min
43
Shots
5

18 February 2010; 14:30	United States	6–0 (4–0, 1–0, 1–0)	Finland	UBC Winter Sports Centre, Vancouver; Attendance: 5,398

Game reference

Jessie Vetter
Goalies
Noora Räty
Referee:
Aina Høve (Norway)

Chu (Ruggiero) – 8:08	1–0
Engstrom (M. Lamoureux) (PP) – 10:47	2–0
Duggan (Darwitz, Marvin) – 11:29	3–0
Darwitz (Engstrom, Chesson) – 18:03	4–0
Knight (Darwitz) – 31:48	5–0
Thatcher (J. Lamoureux, Ruggiero) – 58:22	6–0

12 min
Penalties
6 min
42
Shots
23

18 February 2010; 19:00	China	1–2 (0–0, 1–2, 0–0)	Russia	UBC Winter Sports Centre, Vancouver; Attendance: 5,391

Game reference

Shi Yao
Goalies
Irina Gashennikova
Referee:
Mary Anne Gage (Canada)
Linesmen:
Meghan Margaret Hishmeh (United States)
Anna Majapuro (Finland)

	0–1	24:23 – Smolentseva (Kapustina, Khomich)
	0–2	36:02 – Sergina (Burina, Permyakova) (PP)
Jin (Sun) – 37:38	1–2

4 min
Penalties
12 min
22
Shots
39

== Classification round ==
5th place semifinals
A3	Switzerland	6
B4	China	0
B3	Russia	4
A4	Slovakia	2

5th place game
A3	Switzerland	2
B3	Russia	1
7th place game
B4	China	3
A4	Slovakia	1

=== Fifth place semifinal ===
All times are local (UTC−8).

20 February 2010; 14:30	Switzerland	6–0 (2–0, 2–0, 2–0)	China	UBC Winter Sports Centre, Vancouver; Attendance: 5,454

Game reference

Florence Schelling
Goalies
Shi Yao (out 7:53)
Jia Dandan (in 7:53)
Referee:
Leah Wrazidlo (United States)

Lehmann (S. Marty) – 7:02	1–0
S. Marty – 7:53	2–0
Nussbaum (J. Marty, Lehmann) (PP) – 37:12	3–0
S. Marty (Lehmann, Leimgruber) – 39:44	4–0
S. Marty (Lehmann, Meier) – 54:54	5–0
S. Marty (Leimgruber, Benz) – 58:48	6–0

16 min
Penalties
6 min
49
Shots
21

20 February 2010; 19:00	Russia	4–2 (2–0, 1–1, 1–1)	Slovakia	UBC Winter Sports Centre, Vancouver; Attendance: 5,488

Game reference

Irina Gashennikova
Goalies
Zuzana Tomčíková
Referee:
Aina Høve (Norway)
Linesmen:
Annica Flöden (Sweden)
Kerry Rumble (Canada)

Sotnikova (Lebedeva) – 7:34	1–0
Gavrilova (Sergina, Smolentseva) (PP) – 18:16	2–0
	2–1	23:24 – Pravlíková (Veličková) (PP)
Terentieva (Kapustina, Dyubanok) (SH) – 33:45	3–1
	3–2	40:31 – Kapustová (Veličková)
Gavrilova (PP) – 50:26	4–2

8 min
Penalties
8 min
43
Shots
19

=== Seventh place game ===
All times are local (UTC−8).

22 February 2010; 14:00	China	3–1 (0–1, 1–0, 2–0)	Slovakia	UBC Winter Sports Centre, Vancouver; Attendance: 5,284

Game reference

Shi Yao
Goalies
Zuzana Tomčíková
Referee:
Joy Tottman (Great Britain)

	0–1	10:37 – Pravlíková (Jurčová, Veličková)
Wang L. (Yu, Jiang) – 37:15	1–1
Sun (Zhang S., Jin) – 45:04	2–1
Wang L. (Zhang B.) – 51:44	3–1

4 min
Penalties
6 min
32
Shots
21

=== Fifth place game ===
All times are local (UTC−8).

22 February 2010; 19:00	Switzerland	2–1 GWS (0–1, 1–0, 0–0) (OT: 0–0) (SO: 1–0)	Russia	UBC Winter Sports Centre, Vancouver; Attendance: 5,412

Game reference
Florence Schelling	Goalies	Irina Gashennikova	Referee: Ulla Sipilä (Finland); Linesmen: Zuzana Arazimová (Czech Republic); Kerry Rumble (Canada)
/ 0–1 / 9:05 – Burina (Sergina, Permyakova) (PP); S. Marty (Nussbaum, Meier) (PP) – 34:12 / 1–1			Referee: Ulla Sipilä (Finland); Linesmen: Zuzana Arazimová (Czech Republic); Kerry Rumble (Canada)
Lehmann (miss); Bullo; S. Marty	Shootout	Sosina; (miss) Gavrilova; (miss) Deulina	Referee: Ulla Sipilä (Finland); Linesmen: Zuzana Arazimová (Czech Republic); Kerry Rumble (Canada)
10 min	Penalties	16 min	Referee: Ulla Sipilä (Finland); Linesmen: Zuzana Arazimová (Czech Republic); Kerry Rumble (Canada)
27	Shots	33	Referee: Ulla Sipilä (Finland); Linesmen: Zuzana Arazimová (Czech Republic); Kerry Rumble (Canada)

== Final round ==
Semifinals
A1	Canada	5
B2	Finland	0
B1	United States	9
A2	Sweden	1

Finals
A1	Canada	2
B1	United States	0
Third place
B2	Finland	3
A2	Sweden	2

=== Semifinals ===
All times are local (UTC−8).

22 February 2010; 12:00	Sweden	1–9 (0–2, 1–3, 0–4)	United States	Canada Hockey Place, Vancouver; Attendance: 16,021

Game reference

Kim Martin
Goalies
Jessie Vetter
Referee:
Mary Anne Gage (Canada)

	0–1	7:14 – M. Lamoureux (Potter, Knight)
	0–2	8:23 – Duggan (Cahow, Stack) (PP)
	0–3	23:22 – Ruggiero (J. Lamoureux)
	0–4	25:58 – Cahow (Thatcher)
Winberg (Jordansson) (PP) – 29:34	1–4
	1–5	33:35 – Thatcher (J. Lamoureux, Lawler)
	1–6	45:59 – M. Lamoureux (Potter, Engstrom) (PP)
	1–7	47:15 – Weiland (Lawler)
	1–8	55:20 – Stack (Chu, Engstrom)
	1–9	57:19 – M. Lamoureux (Knight) (PP)

10 min
Penalties
8 min
12
Shots
46

22 February 2010; 17:00	Finland	0–5 (0–2, 0–1, 0–2)	Canada	Canada Hockey Place, Vancouver; Attendance: 16,324

Game reference

Noora Räty
Goalies
Shannon Szabados
Referee:
Nicole Hertrich (Canada)

0–1	5:22 – Piper (Agosta, Hefford)
0–2	14:36 – Irwin
0–3	36:21 – Agosta (Bonhomme, Hefford)
0–4	44:23 – Irwin (Johnston, Vaillancourt)
0–5	58:57 – Ouellette (Poulin) (SH)

12 min
Penalties
10 min
11
Shots
50

=== Bronze medal game ===
All times are local (UTC−8).

25 February 2010; 11:00	Sweden	2–3 (OT) (0–0, 1–2, 1–0, 0–1)	Finland (bronze)	Canada Hockey Place, Vancouver; Attendance: 16,398

Game reference

Sara Grahn
Goalies
Noora Räty
Referee:
Nicole Hertrich (Germany)

	0–1	24:24 – Pelttari
Rooth (Jordansson, Eliasson) (PP) – 32:24	1–1
	1–2	36:02 – Karvinen (Välimäki)
Rundqvist (G. Andersson, Holmlöv) (PP) – 45:09	2–2
	2–3	62:33 – Rantamäki (Tuominen, Hiirikoski)

12 min
Penalties
14 min
18
Shots
24

=== Final ===
All times are local (UTC−8).

25 February 2010; 15:30	(gold) Canada	2–0 (2–0, 0–0, 0–0)	United States (silver)	Canada Hockey Place, Vancouver; Attendance: 16,805

Game reference
Shannon Szabados	Goalies	Jessie Vetter	Referee: Aina Høve (Norway)
Poulin (Botterill) – 13:55 / 1–0; Poulin (Agosta) – 16:50 / 2–0			Referee: Aina Høve (Norway)
12 min	Penalties	10 min	Referee: Aina Høve (Norway)
18	Shots	21	Referee: Aina Høve (Norway)

== Final rankings ==
The final rankings of the 2010 Winter Olympics Women's Ice Hockey Tournament are as follows:

Rank	Team
1st place, gold medalist(s)	Canada
2nd place, silver medalist(s)	United States
3rd place, bronze medalist(s)	Finland
4th	Sweden
5th	Switzerland
6th	Russia
7th	China
8th	Slovakia

== Statistics ==
=== Leading scorers ===
Rank	Player	Games played	Goals	Assists	Pts	PIM	+/-
1	Meghan Agosta (CAN)	5	9	6	15	2	+14
2	Jayna Hefford (CAN)	5	5	7	12	8	+15
3	Stefanie Marty (SUI)	5	9	2	11	6	+4
4	Jenny Potter (USA)	5	6	5	11	0	+8
5	Natalie Darwitz (USA)	5	4	7	11	0	+6
6	Caroline Ouellette (CAN)	5	2	9	11	2	+12
6	Hayley Wickenheiser (CAN)	5	2	9	11	0	+14
8	Cherie Piper (CAN)	5	5	5	10	0	+12
9	Monique Lamoureux (USA)	5	4	6	10	2	+7
10	Kelli Stack (USA)	5	3	5	8	2	+4
10	Sarah Vaillancourt (CAN)	5	3	5	8	6	+7

Hat-trick scorers

- Meghan Agosta (CAN) (2)
- Jayna Hefford (CAN)
- Pernilla Winberg (SWE)
- Stefanie Marty (SUI) (2)
- Monique Lamoureux (USA)
- Jenny Potter (USA) (2)

=== Leading goaltenders ===
Goalies with 40% or more of their team's total minutes

Rank	Goalie	GP	Minutes	GA	GAA	SV%	Saves
1	Shannon Szabados (CAN)	3	180:00	1	0.33	98.04	50
2	Jessie Vetter (USA)	4	239:50	3	0.75	95.77	68
3	Florence Schelling (SUI)	5	301:55	16	3.18	90.91	160
4	Irina Gashennikova (RUS)	4	250:00	10	2.40	90.20	92
5	Shi Yao (CHN)	5	247:53	19	4.60	88.82	151

Shutout posters

- Kim St-Pierre (CAN)
- Shannon Szabados (CAN) (2)
- Kim Martin (SWE)
- Florence Schelling (SUI)
- Jessie Vetter (USA) (2)

== Awards ==
Canada's Meghan Agosta was named the most valuable player and received the Directorate Award for best forward of the tournament. Directorate Awards also went to Molly Engstrom (United States) for best defenceman, and to Shannon Szabados (Canada) for best goaltender.

The tournament all-star team was voted on by the international media at the conclusion of the event. The following players were named:

Position	Player	Team
G	Shannon Szabados	Canada
D	Angela Ruggiero	United States
D	Molly Engstrom	United States
F	Meghan Agosta	Canada
F	Jenny Potter	United States
F	Marie-Philip Poulin	Canada
