= 2005–06 Minnesota Duluth Bulldogs women's ice hockey season =

American college ice hockey team season

== Regular season ==
=== Standings ===
2005–06 Western Collegiate Hockey Association standings
	Conference								Overall					
	GP	W	L	T	SOW	PTS	GF	GA	GP	W	L	T	GF	GA
Wisconsin†*	28	24	3	1	–	49	103	40	41	36	4	1	155	51
Minnesota	28	19	8	1	–	39	82	50	41	29	11	1	122	69
Minnesota Duluth	28	18	7	3	–	39	97	47	34	22	9	3	120	54
St. Cloud State	28	13	14	1	–	27	70	69	37	18	18	1	97	98
Ohio State	28	10	15	3	–	23	68	89	36	13	18	5	87	107
Bemidji State	28	10	18	0	–	20	60	95	36	11	23	2	72	119
Minnesota State	28	8	17	3	–	19	52	75	36	11	21	4	70	102
North Dakota	28	3	23	2	–	8	40	107	36	7	27	2	60	131
Championship: † indicates conference regular season champion; * indicates conference tournament champion Updated July 21, 2024

== Player stats ==
= Indicates team leader

=== Skaters ===
Player	Games	Goals	Assists	Points	Points/game	PIM	GWG	PPG	SHG
Jessica Koizumi	34	17	26	43	1.2647	0	2	5	0
Noemie Marin	30	22	17	39	1.3000	0	1	7	0
Michaela Lanzl	26	18	11	29	1.1154	0	5	8	0
Allison Lehrke	32	5	16	21	0.6563	0	0	0	1
Sara O'Toole	34	11	8	19	0.5588	0	6	3	0
Rachael Drazan	34	5	14	19	0.5588	0	1	2	1
Krista McArthur	34	4	11	15	0.4412	0	1	2	0
Mari Pehkonen	27	8	6	14	0.5185	0	2	1	0
Tawni Mattila	33	6	8	14	0.4242	0	2	3	0
Juliane Jubinville	29	6	6	12	0.4138	0	0	1	0
Jill Sales	32	3	7	10	0.3125	0	0	0	0
Samantha Hough	29	3	5	8	0.2759	0	0	1	0
Larissa Luther	24	2	6	8	0.3333	0	0	0	0
Suvi Vacker	34	3	4	7	0.2059	0	1	0	0
Ashly Waggoner	34	2	3	5	0.1471	0	0	0	0
Myriam Trepanier	28	2	2	4	0.1429	0	0	0	0
Melissa Roy	33	1	2	3	0.0909	0	1	0	0
Karine Demeule	27	1	1	2	0.0741	0	0	0	0
Erin Holznagel	11	0	2	2	0.1818	0	0	0	0
Erin Olson	17	1	0	1	0.0588	0	0	0	0
Kirsti Hakala	7	0	1	1	0.1429	0	0	0	0
Rachael Bertram	1	0	0	0	0.0000	0	0	0	0
Riitta Schaublin	33	0	0	0	0.0000	0	0	0	0
Danielle Ciarletta	4	0	0	0	0.0000	0	0	0	0
Becky Salyards	3	0	0	0	0.0000	0	0	0	0
Jessica Hawkins	19	0	0	0	0.0000	0	0	0	0

=== Goaltenders ===
Player	Games	Wins	Losses	Ties	Goals against	Minutes	GAA	Shutouts	Saves	Save %
Danielle Ciarletta	4	2	0	0	2	101	1.1852	0	25	.926
Riitta Schaublin	33	20	9	3	51	1951	1.5683	4	838	.943

== Awards and honors ==
- Noemie Marin, Top 10 Finalist, 2006 Patty Kazmaier Award
- Riitta Schaublin, Top 3 Finalist, 2006 Patty Kazmaier Award
