= Mari Pehkonen =

Finnish ice hockey player

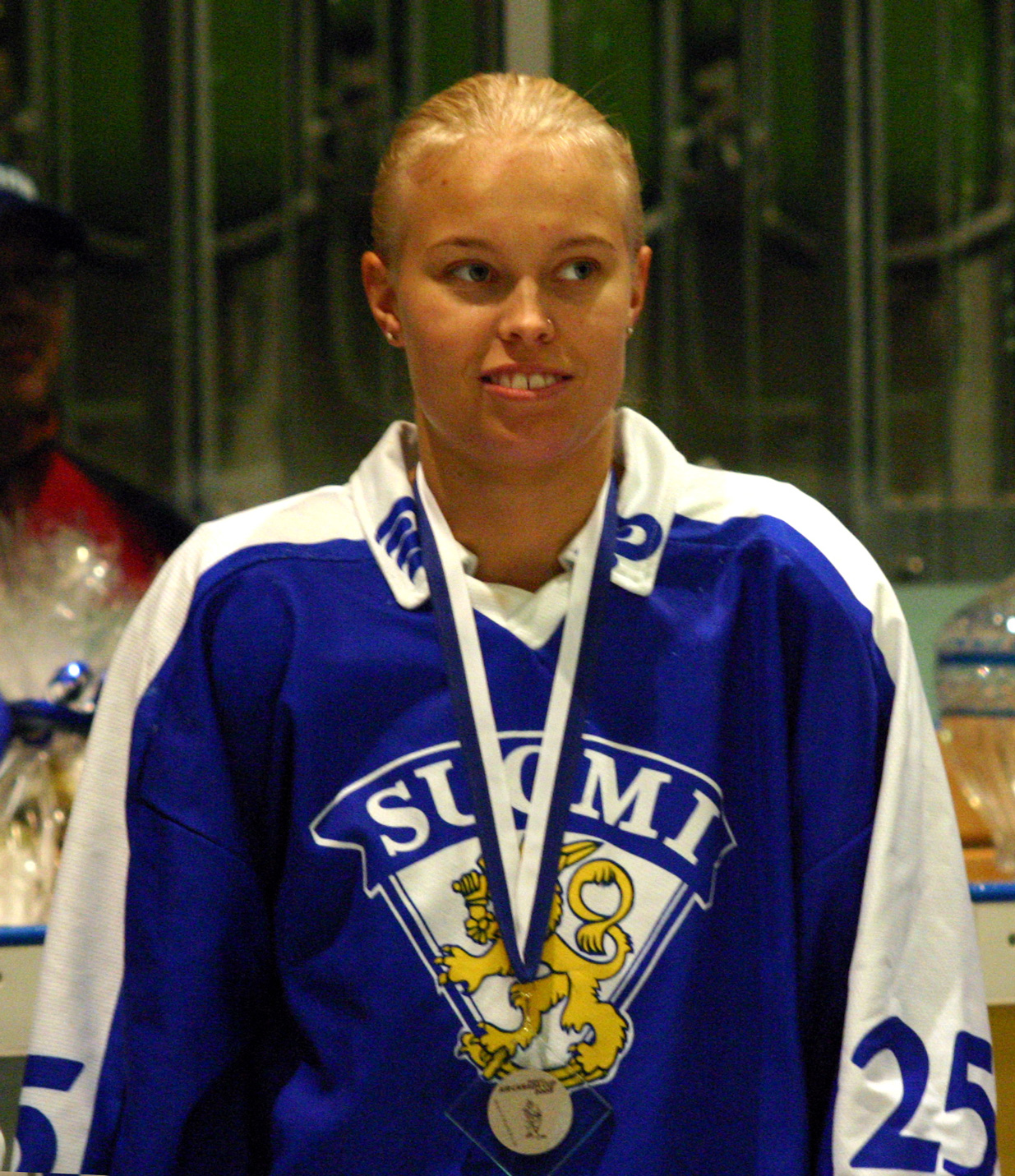
- Pehkonen representing Finland at the 2008 World Championship
- Born: 6 February 1985 (age 41) Tampere, Finland
- Height: 5 ft 7 in (170 cm)
- Weight: 146 lb (66 kg; 10 st 6 lb)
- Position: Forward
- Shot: Left
- Played for: Tappara Tampere; Ilves Tampere; Minnesota Duluth Bulldogs; Providence Friars
- National team: Finland
- Playing career: 1999–2010
Medal record
Women's ice hockey
Representing Finland
World Championship
Bronze medal – third place	2008 China
Bronze medal – third place	2009 Finland

Mari Heini Emilia Pehkonen (born 6 February 1985) is a Finnish retired ice hockey player. She represented Finland in the women's ice hockey tournament at the 2006 Winter Olympics and won bronze medals at the IIHF Women's World Championships in 2008 and 2009.

== Playing career ==
=== Finland ===
Pehkonen competed in the Naisten SM-sarja ('Women's Finnish Championship Series') during 1999 to 2005, playing with Tappara Naiset (1999–2004) and Ilves Naiset (2004–05), both based in her home city of Tampere. She debuted in the league with Tappara in the 1999–2000 season. at age fourteen. She was named team MVP in 2002–03 and was Tappara's scoring leader in the 2003–04 season.

In the 2004–05 Naisten SM-sarja season, Pehkonen transferred to the Tampereen Ilves Naiset, joining a star studded roster that included Maija Hassinen-Sullanmaa, Jenni Hiirikoski, Nina Linde, Mari Saarinen, Eveliina Similä, and Saara Niemi (née Tuominen), among other stars of international ice hockey. Though she played in just 10 regular season games, she led the team in goals, with 19, and set a still-standing club record of 3.30 points per game in a season. Her scoring totals ranked second in the league for goals, trailing only the legendary Karoliina Rantamäki, and third in the league for points. In the 2005 Finnish Championship playoffs, she contributed a goal to the team's silver medal finish. Also in 2005, she won gold at the Finnish Championship tournament in under-20 ice hockey with the Ilves U20 team, finishing as the top goal scorer of the competition.

=== NCAA hockey ===
Pehkonen joined the Minnesota Duluth Bulldogs women's ice hockey program of the NCAA Division I as an incoming freshman for the 2005–06 season. She played one season with the program, registering 8 goals and 14 points, before transferring to the Providence Friars women's ice hockey program, also of the NCAA Division I.

As a sophomore, she played in 34 of the Friars' 36 games. She led the team with 18 goals. Her 29 points were the most by a sophomore, and the third highest total on the team. In addition, she led the team with 12 power play goals and scored 10 power play goals in Hockey East play (tied for first in the conference). She led the Friars in game-winning goals with four.

== International play ==
Pehkonen was a member of the Finnish national under-22 team during 2002 to 2005 and was the leading scorer for two out of three seasons.

In 2005, she was selected to the Finnish Olympic delegation for the 2006 Olympics. She made her senior national team debut in the women's ice hockey tournament at the 2006 Olympics. Across five Olympic matches Pehkonen led all Finns in scoring, with three goals – netting one goal each against Germany, Switzerland, and the United States during the preliminary round.

She was selected to play for Finland in the 2007 IIHF World Championships, where she registered a goal and an assist in Finland's five games. At the 2008 IIHF World Champhionships, she scored three goals and two assists and was voted Team Finland's Most Outstanding Forward.

== Personal life ==
Pehkonen also played association football in her youth and was a member of the Finnish women's national under-17 football team in 2001.

== Player statistics ==
=== International ===
Year	Team	Event	Result	GP	G	A	Pts	PIM
2006	Finland	OG	4th	5	3	0	3	2
2007	Finland	WW	4th	5	1	1	2	10
2008	Finland	WW	3rd place, bronze medalist(s)	5	3	3	6	4
2009	Finland	WW	3rd place, bronze medalist(s)	5	3	2	5	4
Totals				20	10	6	16	20

== Awards and honors ==
- Hockey East All-Tournament team, 2007
- Hockey East All-Tournament Team, 2008
