= Nina Tikkinen =

Finnish ice hockey player

- Born: February 6, 1987 (age 39) Salo, Finland
- Height: 170 cm (5 ft 7 in)
- Weight: 66 kg (146 lb; 10 st 6 lb)
- Position: Forward
- Shot: Left
- Played for: TPS Turku; Oulun Kärpät; Minnesota State Mavericks
- National team: Finland
- Playing career: 2003–2015
Medal record
Olympic Games
Bronze medal – third place	2010 Vancouver	Ice hockey
World Championship
Bronze medal – third place	2009 Finland
Bronze medal – third place	2008 China

Nina Minttu Maria Tikkinen (born 6 February 1987) is a Finnish retired ice hockey player. She played with the Finnish national team from 2004 until 2014 and won bronze medals at the 2010 Winter Olympic Games and at the 2008 and 2009 IIHF Women's World Championships.

Tikkinen played college ice hockey in the NCAA Division I with the Minnesota State Mavericks women's ice hockey program of Minnesota State University, Mankato from the 2007–08 season to the 2010–11 season. She played in the Finnish Naisten SM-sarja with TPS Turku and Kärpät Naiset.

== Playing career ==
=== Finland ===
She spent three years competing with the Finnish national team and selected Rookie of the Year in 2003–04. She participated in the 2007 World Championships and the 2006 Four Nations Tournament as a member of Finland's National Team. In 2006–07, she tallied three goals and four assists for seven points for her club team, Karpat Oulu. Tikkinen joined three fellow Western Collegiate Hockey Association players: two from Minnesota Duluth and one from Minnesota on the 2010 Olympic team roster. There was also one from Ohio State of the CCHA.

Tikkinen also played with Finland in the 2013 Women's World Championship.

=== Minnesota State Mavericks ===
In 2008–09, Tikkinen played in 28 games for the Mavericks. Her rookie season was 2007–08, and she finished the season as the top freshman scorer with 5 goals, 6 assists and 11 points. Her first multi-point game was on Feb. 9, 2008 (two assists) was the first of her collegiate career. The first goal of her NCAA career was scored on October 13, 2007, at Connecticut. On November 5 and 6, 2010, Tikkinen accumulated five points as the Mavericks won back-to-back conference games against St. Cloud State. Tikkinen had three points on November 5. The three points were all assists on Minnesota State's first three scores, including teammate Kathleen Rogan's game-winning goal in the first period. The following day, Tikkinen gave the Mavericks a 2–0 lead midway through the second period. The two victories gave Minnesota State their first home ice series sweep since October 31-November 1, 2008 when they beat Bemidji State.

On November 12 and 13, Nina Tikkinen produced a four-goal, five-point series as the Mavericks won twice on the road against league rival Ohio State. For her efforts, she was named WCHA Player of the Week for the second straight time. Tikkinen had two goals and one assist for three points as Minnesota State won by a 5–3 tally on November 12. Both of her goals tied the game (2–2 in the second period, 3–3 in the third). On November 13, she broke a 3–3 tie with a game-winning goal with only 3:45 left. Tikkinen now has a four-game winning streak. It also marked her second straight five-point weekend.

== Career statistics ==
=== Finland ===
Event	Goals	Assists	Points	Shots	PIM	+/-
2010 Winter Olympics	2	0	2	2	11	−3

=== Minnesota Mankato ===
Season	Games Played	Goals	Assists	Points	Power Play Goals
2007–08	28	5	6	11	3
2008–09	28	9	9	18	4
2009–10	15	1	6	7	

== Awards and honors ==
- WCHA Scholar-Athlete, 2009
- All-WCHA Academic Team, 2009
- WCHA Offensive Player of the Week (Week of November 10, 2010)
- WCHA Offensive Player of the Week, (Week of November 17, 2010)
