= Ulla Sipilä =

Finnish ice hockey referee

Ulla Sipilä is a Finnish ice hockey referee. She has officiated in the Women's World Cup (2008 and 2009) as well as the 2010 Winter Olympics.
