= Klara Myrén =

Swedish ice hockey player

- Born: 25 May 1991 (age 35) Borlänge, Sweden
- Height: 172 cm (5 ft 8 in)
- Weight: 74 kg (163 lb; 11 st 9 lb)
- Position: Forward
- Shoots: Right
- Damtvåan team Former teams: Falu IF; Vermont Catamounts; Leksands IF; Brynäs IF
- National team: Sweden
- Playing career: 2004–present

Klara Myrén (born 25 May 1991) is a Swedish ice hockey player and former member of the Swedish national ice hockey team. She represented Sweden at the 2010 Winter Olympics. Her college ice hockey career was played with the Vermont Catamounts women's ice hockey program of the NCAA Division I.

== Playing career ==
Myrén played with Leksands IF Dam of the Riksserien, during the 2010–11 season. Statistically, she registered 11 goals and 13 assists in 21 games.

=== Team Sweden ===
Myrén was a member of the Swedish under-18 national team from 2006 to 2009. As a member, she participated in the IIHF U18 Women's World Championships in 2008 and 2009. At the 2009 tournament in Füssen, Germany, she won a bronze medal.

With the senior national team, she took part in the IIHF Women's World Championships in 2008, 2009, and 2012. She was the youngest member of the Swedish team that participated in the women's ice hockey tournament at the 2010 Winter Olympics. During the 2010 Winter Games in Vancouver, she accumulated two assists in five games played, as Sweden finished in fourth place.

== Career stats ==
=== Team Sweden ===
Event	GP	G	A	Pts	PIM	PPG	SHG	GWG
2010 Winter Games	5	0	2	2	0	0	0	0
