= Melanie Häfliger =

Swiss ice hockey player

- Born: 29 September 1982 (age 44) Schenkon, Switzerland
- Height: 159 cm (5 ft 3 in)
- Weight: 55 kg (121 lb; 8 st 9 lb)
- Position: Forward
- Shot: Left
- Played for: SC Reinach; KSC Küssnacht; ZSC Lions
- National team: Switzerland
- Playing career: 2000–2013

Melanie Häfliger (born 29 September 1982) is a Swiss retired ice hockey forward, currently the general manager of the Switzerland women's national team. She previously served as head coach of the Swiss women's national under-18 team and as an assistant coach to the senior women's team.

== International career ==
Häfliger was selected to represent Switzerland in the women's ice hockey tournament at the 2010 Winter Olympics. She played in all five games, scoring one assist.

With the Swiss national team, Häfliger participated in five IIHF Women's World Championships, four in the Top Division and one in Division I. Her first appearance came in 2001.

She ended her playing career in 2013.

== Career statistics ==
=== International career ===
| Year | Team | Event | GP | G | A | Pts | PIM |
|---|---|---|---|---|---|---|---|
| 2001 | Switzerland | WW DI | 1 | 0 | 0 | 0 | 0 |
| 2004 | Switzerland | WW | 4 | 0 | 0 | 0 | 2 |
| 2007 | Switzerland | WW | 4 | 0 | 0 | 0 | 8 |
| 2008 | Switzerland | WW | 5 | 1 | 1 | 2 | 10 |
| 2010 | Switzerland | Oly | 5 | 0 | 1 | 1 | 2 |
| 2011 | Switzerland | WW | 5 | 0 | 1 | 1 | 2 |
