= Isabelle Jordansson =

Swedish ice hockey forward (born 1991)

- Born: 8 March 1991 (age 35) Danderyd, Sweden
- Height: 5 ft 6 in (168 cm)
- Weight: 148 lb (67 kg; 10 st 8 lb)
- Position: Forward
- Shoots: Left
- National team: Sweden
- Playing career: 2008–present

Isabelle Helen Jordansson (born 8 March 1991 in Danderyd, Sweden) is a Swedish ice hockey forward.

== International career ==
Jordansson was selected for the Sweden women's national ice hockey team in the 2010 Winter Olympics. She played in all five games, recording three assists. She also appeared for Sweden at two IIHF Women's World Championships. Her first appearance came in 2008. She made two appearances for the Sweden women's national under-18 ice hockey team, at the IIHF World Women's U18 Championships in 2008 and 2009, including winning a bronze medal in the 2009 event.

== Career statistics ==
=== International career ===
Year	Team	Event	GP	G	A	Pts	PIM
2008	Sweden U18	U18	5	1	3	4	6
2008	Sweden	WW	4	2	2	4	0
2009	Sweden U18	U18	5	2	2	4	2
2009	Sweden	WW	5	0	2	2	2
2010	Sweden	Oly	5	0	3	3	0
