= Rachael Drazan =

American ice hockey player (born 1986)

Rachel Drazan
- Born: January 11, 1986 (age 39) Orono, Minnesota, U.S.
- Height: 5 ft 6 in (168 cm)
- Weight: 150 lb (68 kg; 10 st 10 lb)
- Position: Defence
- Shot: Left
- Played for: Minnesota Whitecaps
- Playing career: 2009–2011

Rachael Drazan
Medal record

Women's ice hockey

Representing United States

IIHF World Women's Championships
Gold medal – first place	2008	Tournament

Rachael Drazan (born January 11, 1986) played several games for the 2009–10 United States national women's ice hockey team.

Drazan also played hockey for the Minnesota Golden Gophers women's ice hockey program. For the seasons 2009–2010 and 2010–2011, she played for the Minnesota Whitecaps, a professional women's ice hockey team in the WWHL.

Drazan, who now goes by her married name (Rachael Malmberg), is a lung cancer survivor.

== Playing career ==
=== Minnesota Duluth Bulldogs ===
Drazan was one of three Bulldogs named to the WCHA All-Star Team, which faced the United States National Team in September 2005. As a Bulldog, she was named to the WCHA All-Rookie Team her freshman year.

=== Minnesota Golden Gophers ===
After the 2005–06 season, Drazan left the Minnesota Duluth Bulldogs and joined the Minnesota Golden Gophers. During the 2007–08 season, she was paired with Anya Miller and scored 10 goals and 17 assists for 27 points. Her plus/minus rating of +19 led all Gophers defenders. She was part of the Gopher power play, which ranked first in the WCHA and third in the nation (24.5 conversion percentage).

On October 5, she began her Gophers career with a goal and an assist against the Northeastern Huskies. Against her former school, Minnesota Duluth (on October 26), she had the game-winning, power-play goal. In a 3–2 victory over Wisconsin on November 3, she scored a goal and an assist. She accumulated two assists in a 5–0 win on November 30 versus the Bemidji State Beavers women's ice hockey program. In a match against the Ohio State Buckeyes women’s ice hockey program on February 8, Drazan had a career-high three points in the 7–3 win.

In her final year with the Gophers (2008–09), she missed six games due to an injury. For the season, she scored five goals and 16 assists for 21 points. Her plus/minus rating was +22. Against rival Minnesota Duluth on October 10, she set up Gigi Marvin’s power play goal. Drazan scored her first goal of the season (and multiple-point game also) in an 8–2 win over Ohio State contested on October 18. Versus the Harvard Crimson women's ice hockey program(on November 29), Drazan netted a power-play goal in a 3–2 win. In a defeat of the MSU-Mankato Mavericks (on January 31), Drazan established a career-high in assists (3) and points (4) in one game. On February 28, Drazan had an assist in a first round playoff win over Bemidji State. The final game of her career came in the 2009 NCAA Frozen Four. She had two assists although the Golden Gophers lost to the Mercyhurst Lakers.

=== USA Hockey ===
Drazan was a three-time member of USA Hockey’s Under-22 Team. She also played for the United States national team at the 2006 Four Nation’s Cup and earned a silver medal. In 2008, Drazan would participate in the 2008 IIHF Women's World Championships, and win a gold medal with Team USA. Despite participating in the Qwest Tour with the United States national women's team in 2009–10, she was not selected for the Olympic team.

== Awards and honors ==
- March 3, 2005: Rachael Drazan is named to the WCHA All Rookie team
- March 23, 2005: Rachael Drazan is honored with a USCHO.com All-Rookie Team selection.
- 2008 First Team All-WCHA
- 2008 WCHA All-Academic
- 2008 Academic All-Big Ten honouree
- 2009 All-WCHA Academic Team member
- 2009 Second-Team All-WCHA
- 2009 Hockey Humanitarian Award nominee
