= Evelyn Bazzanella =

Italian ice hockey player (born 1976)

Personal information
- Nationality: Italian
- Born: 15 June 1976 (age 49) Bolzano, Italy

Sport
- Sport: Ice hockey

Evelyn Bazzanella (born 15 June 1976) is an Italian ice hockey player. She competed in the women's tournament at the 2006 Winter Olympics.
