= Sabrina Viel =

Italian ice hockey player

- Born: 17 February 1973 (age 52); Belluno, Italy
- Height: 165 cm (5 ft 5 in)
- Weight: 53 kg (117 lb; 8 st 5 lb)
- Position: Forward
- Shot: Right
- Played for: Agordo
- National team: Italy
- Playing career: 1998–2011

Sabrina Viel (born 17 February 1973) is an Italian ice hockey player. She competed in the women's tournament at the 2006 Winter Olympics.
