= Amanda Carr (ice hockey) =

- Born: 3 October 1990 (age 36) Reading, England
- Height: 170 cm (5 ft 7 in)
- Weight: 67 kg (148 lb; 10 st 8 lb)
- Position: Defence
- Shot: Right
- Played for: Bracknell Queen Bees; Swindon TopCats; Sheffield Shadows
- National team: Great Britain
- Playing career: 2002–2017

Amanda Handisides née Carr (born 3 October 1990) plays for Great Britain women's national ice hockey team as defence player.
