= Nicholas Vakar =

Belarusian writer (1894–1970)

Nicholas P. Vakar (26 or 27 May 1894 in Tulchyn, Ukraine, then in Russian Empire – 1970), Belarusian, author of Belorussia: The Making of a Nation. Harvard U. Press. 1956 and The Taproot of Soviet Society. Harper. 1959. A Word Count of Spoken Russian. OSU Press, 1966.

He was professor of Russian, Wheaton College, Norton, Massachusetts, from about 1946 to 1962, followed by 3 years at Ohio State University.

Vakar left to France as a result of events during the Russian Civil War. He was married in 1926 to Gertrude Vakar, the translator. They had two daughters, Catherine in 1927 and Anna in 1929; both girls have escaped from France to the United States in 1940. Nicholas and Gertrude arrived in the United States in 1942. The latter is well-known Canadian haiku poet residing in Oliver, British Columbia.
