= Shi Yao =

Chinese ice hockey player

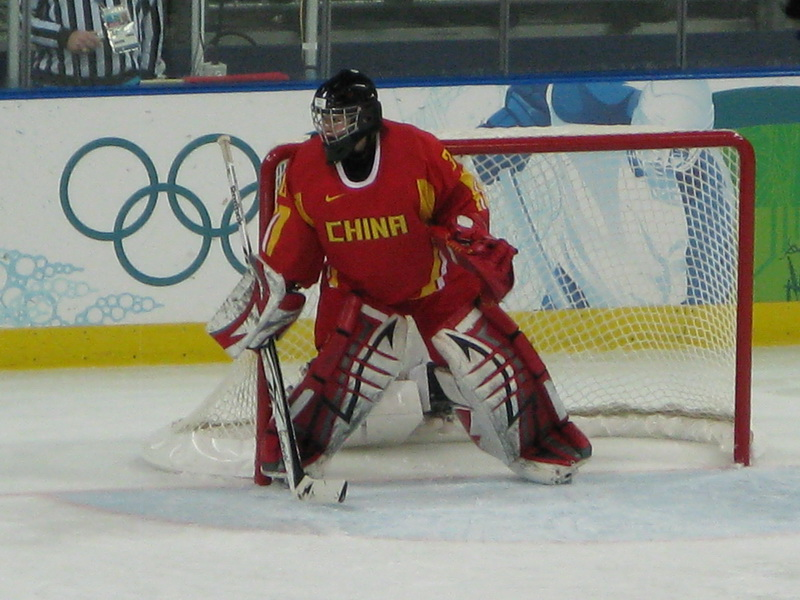
- Shi in net against Russia at the 2010 Winter Olympics
- Born: January 13, 1987 (age 39) Harbin, Heilongjiang, China
- Height: 178 cm (5 ft 10 in)
- Weight: 75 kg (165 lb; 11 st 11 lb)
- Position: Goaltender
- Caught: Left
- Played for: Team China (Naisten SM-sarja); Harbin Ice Hockey
- National team: China
Medal record
Women's ice hockey
Asian Winter Games
Bronze medal – third place	2011 Astana–Almaty
Bronze medal – third place	2007 Changchun

Shi Yao (simplified Chinese: 石瑶; traditional Chinese: 石瑤; pinyin: Shí Yáo; born 13 January 1987) is a Chinese retired ice hockey goaltender. She was a member of the Chinese women's national ice hockey team and represented China in the women's ice hockey tournament at the 2010 Winter Olympics. At the 2012 IIHF Women's World Championship Division IB she was selected as Top Goaltender by the directorate.

== Career statistics ==
Year	Team	Event	Result	GP	W	L	T/OT	MIN	GA	SO	GAA	SV%
2010	China	OG	7th	5	1	4	0	247:53	19	0	4.60	0.888
