= Miskolc Ice Hall =

Multi-purpose indoor arena in Miskolc, Hungary

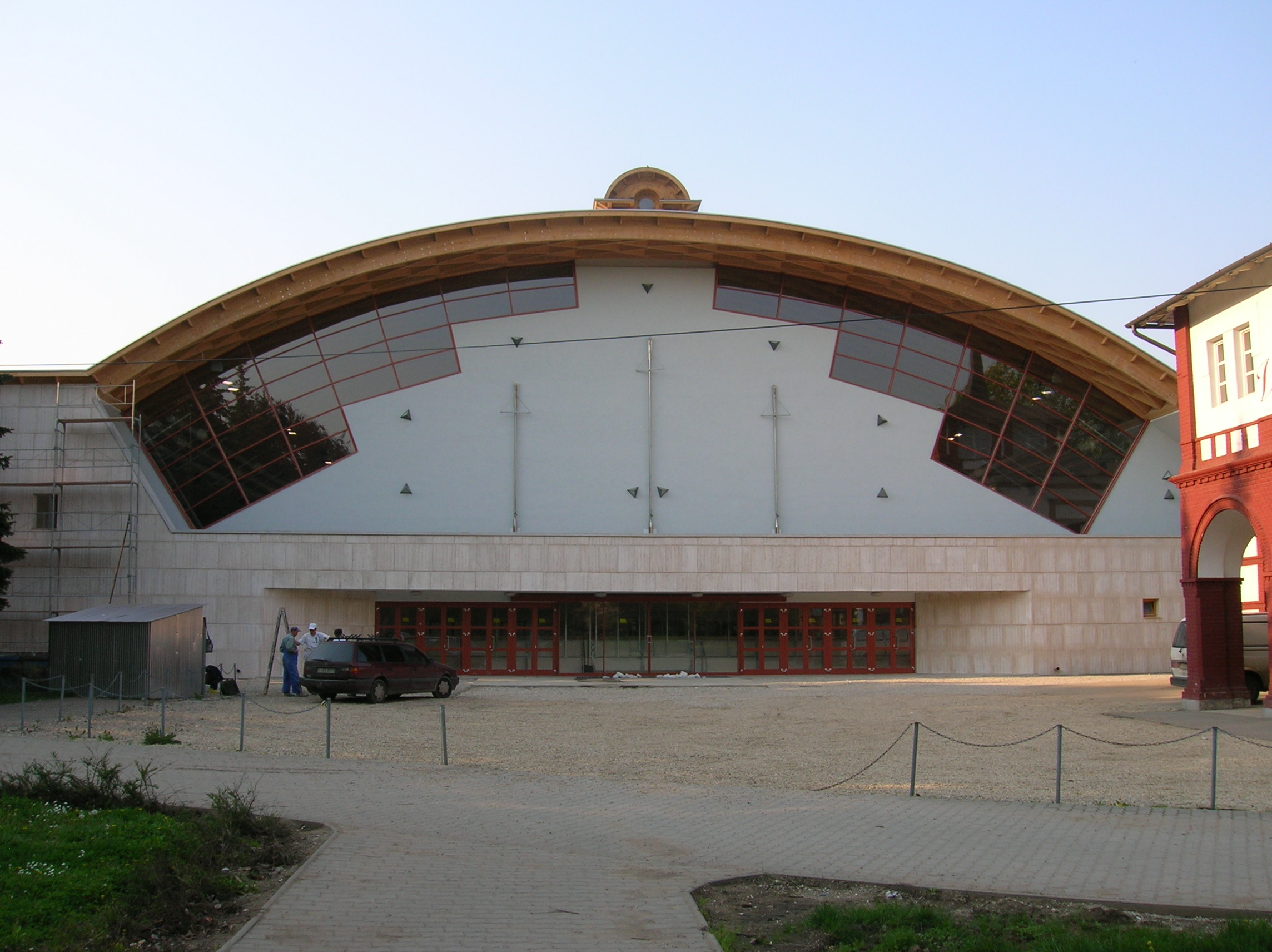
- Interactive map of Miskolc Ice Hall
- Location: Miskolc, Hungary
- Coordinates: 48°05′46″N 20°47′17″E
- Owner: Municipality of Miskolc
- Capacity: 2,200 (1,304 seated)
- Field size: 60 x 30 m

Construction
- Opened: April 2, 2006
- Cost: 1.1 billion Hungarian forints
- Architect: László Rostás
- General contractor: FK-Raszter Építő Zrt.

Tenant
- DVTK Jegesmedvék

Miskolc Ice Hall (Hungarian: Miskolci Jégcsarnok) is a multi-purpose indoor arena in Miskolc, Hungary. It is primarily used for ice sports and is the home arena of Hungarian top division ice hockey club Miskolci JJSE.

== Construction ==
The Municipality of Miskolc decided in the summer of 2004 to build an ice rink in the People's Garden, next to the municipal sports arena. The initial plans were to cover the ice rink with awning at an estimated cost of 310 million Hungarian Forint (approximately US$1.5 million), thus the ice season could be extended. In 2005, however, the representative body of the local government voted for the construction of a multifunctional hall. The project cost was calculated for about 480 million Hungarian Forint (US$2.3 million), which eventually rose to 1.1 billion Hungarian Forint (US$5.3 million). The building and its unique wooden roof was designed by László Rostás and his architect group, Arc Építész Kft.

=== Technical details ===
The arena has 1,800 m^{2} ice surface which makes it suitable to host qualified international events. The ice surface can be covered with a moveable floor thus the multifunctional sports hall can arrange other sports and public events. The grandstand is divided to 10 sectors and has 1,304 seats and an additional 30-seats VIP box. The hall has a complete backroung service (dressing rooms, technical rooms, etc.) and is equipped with modern technical equipment. The ceiling-mounted lighting system can produce 1200–1400 Lux, which makes the arena suitable for television broadcasting.

=== Opening ===
The technical acceptance procedure was completed on March 27, 2006, and the ice hall was opened for the public on April 2 with a show night, where among others Miskolc-born European Champion figure skater Júlia Sebestyén, and the local synchronized skating club performed. From April 3 to April 9, the arena hosted the 2006 IIHF World U18 Championship Division I.
