= Mari Saarinen =

Finnish ice hockey player (born 1981)

- Born: 30 July 1981 (age 45) Kangasala, Pirkanmaa, Finland
- Height: 1.72 m (5 ft 8 in)
- Weight: 66 kg (146 lb; 10 st 6 lb)
- Position: Forward
- Shot: Left
- Played for: Tampereen Ilves Naiset
- National team: Finland
- Playing career: 1998–2012
Medal record
Women's ice hockey
Representing Finland
Olympic Games
Bronze medal – third place	2010 Vancouver	Team
World Championships
Bronze medal – third place	2004 Canada
Bronze medal – third place	2008 China
Bronze medal – third place	2009 Finland

Mari Saarinen (born 30 July 1981) is a Finnish retired ice hockey forward and current assistant coach of Team Kuortane in the Naisten Liiga (NSML). She was the head coach of HPK Kiekkonaiset during the 2020–21 season. Her playing career was spent with the Tampereen Ilves in the Naisten SM-sarja and with the Finnish national team. She represented Finland at the 2006 and 2010 Winter Olympics, winning Olympic bronze in 2010.

== Career stats ==
Event	Goals	Assists	Points	Shots	PIM	+/-
2010 Winter Olympics	0	0	0	2	6	2
