= Gertrude Vakar =

Russian translator (1904–1973)

Gertrude Clafton Vakar (1904 – 1973) was born in Reval, Russian Empire, to family of British descent that had been in the Russian Empire since 1795. She grew up in Arkhangelsk, Russian Empire.

== Life ==
During the Russian Revolution, the Clafton family moved to England, while Gertrude—the oldest of five girls—went to the Russian lycée in Paris on a scholarship. She graduated at the top of her class in 1923. On a visit back to Paris, she met Nicholas Vakar, a former White Army officer, then a writer for the Russian language daily Posledniye Novosti. They married in 1926 and settled in Paris. They had two daughters, Catherine in 1927 and Anna in 1929; both girls have escaped from France to the United States in 1940. The latter is well-known Canadian haiku poet residing in Oliver, British Columbia.

Vakar, trilingual since childhood, translated some 37 novels into Russian, from French or English, perhaps also German, for serialization in the Russian newspapers. She also translated a number of academic works from Russian into English., including many of the works of the psychologist Lev Vygotsky.
