= Lajos Vákár =

Hungarian and Romanian ice hockey player and coach

Lajos Vákár (Hungarian pronunciation: [ˈlɒjoʃ ˈvaːkaːr]; 8 September 1910 – 10 September 1993) was a Hungarian and Romanian ice hockey player and coach.

Born in Csíkszereda, Austria-Hungary (today Miercurea Ciuc, Romania), Vákár was a founding member of HSC Csíkszereda in 1929 and spent his entire career with the club until his retirement 1954, except a short spell at Telefon Club Bucharest (1935–37), winning two Romanian titles in 1949 and 1952. He played for the Romanian national team in the 1930s and participated at three World Championships (1933, 1934, 1935). After retiring from playing he helped HSC Csíkszereda as coach and advisor.

In the final years of World War II he fought for the Royal Hungarian Army on the eastern border of the Kingdom of Hungary.

Vákár died in 1993; in 1999 the skating rink in Miercurea Ciuc was renamed in his honor and since then it is known as Lajos Vákár Ice Hall. A relief, portraying Vákár is to find in the ice hall's lobby. The work of sculptor Zoltán Sárpátki was inaugurated in 2004.
