= Simona Studentová =

Czech ice hockey player

- Born: 24 August 1986 (age 39) Nový Jičín, Czechoslovakia
- Height: 1.56 m (5 ft 1 in)
- Weight: 54 kg (119 lb; 8 st 7 lb)
- Position: Forward
- Shoots: Left
- SWHL A team Former teams: HT Thurgau Ladies: Neuchâtel Hockey Academy; HC Ladies Lugano; SC Reinach; Linköping HC; HC Slavia Praha
- National team: Czech Republic
- Playing career: 2000–present

Simona Studentová (born 24 August 1986) is a Czech ice hockey player and member of the Czech national team, currently playing with HT Thurgau Ladies of the Swiss Women's League.

She has represented the Czech Republic at sixteen IIHF Women's World Championships, including at the Top Division tournaments in 2013, 2016, 2017, and 2019; eight Division 1 tournaments during 1999 to 2009; three Division 1A tournaments during 2012 to 2015; and at the 2011 IIHF Women's World Championship Division II. Studentová holds the Czech national team career records for most games played and most goals scored.
