= Mariya Onolbayeva =

Russian ice hockey player

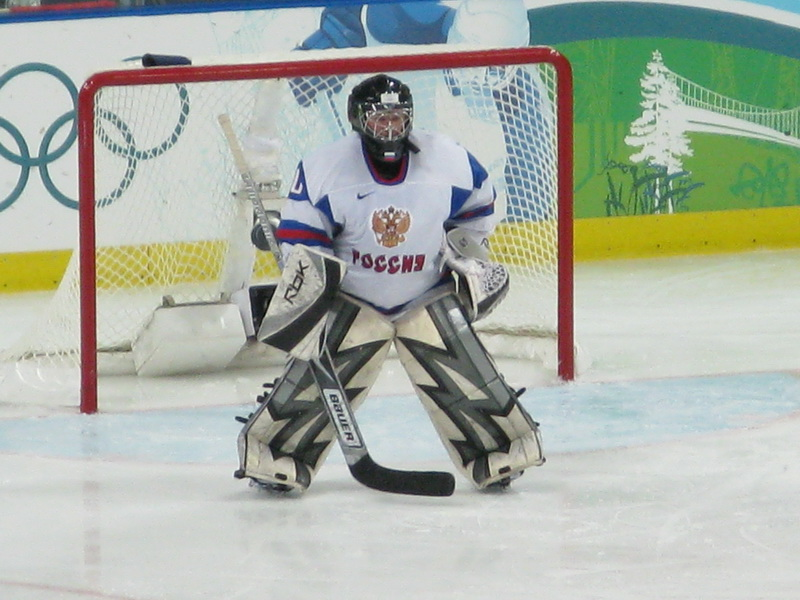
- Mariya Onolbayeva watches the play against China during the 2010 Winter Olympics
- Born: 25 December 1978 (age 47) Murmansk, Soviet Union
- Height: 5 ft 10 in (178 cm)
- Weight: 178 lb (81 kg; 12 st 10 lb)
- Position: Goaltender
- Catches: Left
- team: Fakel Chelyabinsk
- National team: Russia
- Playing career: 2009–present

Mariya Onolbayeva (Russian: Мария Асановна Онолбаева, born 25 December 1978 in Murmansk, Soviet Union) is a Russian female ice hockey player. She was part of the Russia women's national ice hockey team that participated in the 2010 Winter Olympics. Russia finished 6th out of 8 teams.

== Career statistics ==
Year	Team	Event	Result	GP	W	L	T/OT	MIN	GA	SO	GAA	SV%
2010	Russia	OG	6th	1	2	0	0	29:00	3	0	6.21	0.625
