= Sarah Ledger =

British athlete

Sarah Ledger (born 21 September 1989) is a British athlete who plays for the Great Britain women's national ice hockey team as defenseman.
