= Kathrin Lehmann =

Swiss-German ice hockey player and association football player

Personal information
- Nickname: Ka
- Born: Kathrin Margrit Lehmann; 27 February 1980 (age 46) Zürich, Switzerland
- Home town: Küsnacht, Zürich, Switzerland
- Education: LMU Munich
- Occupations: Sports administrator; ice hockey player; association football player
- Height: 172 cm (68 in)
- Weight: 68 kg (150 lb)
- Website: www.kathrinlehmann.com
Ice hockey career
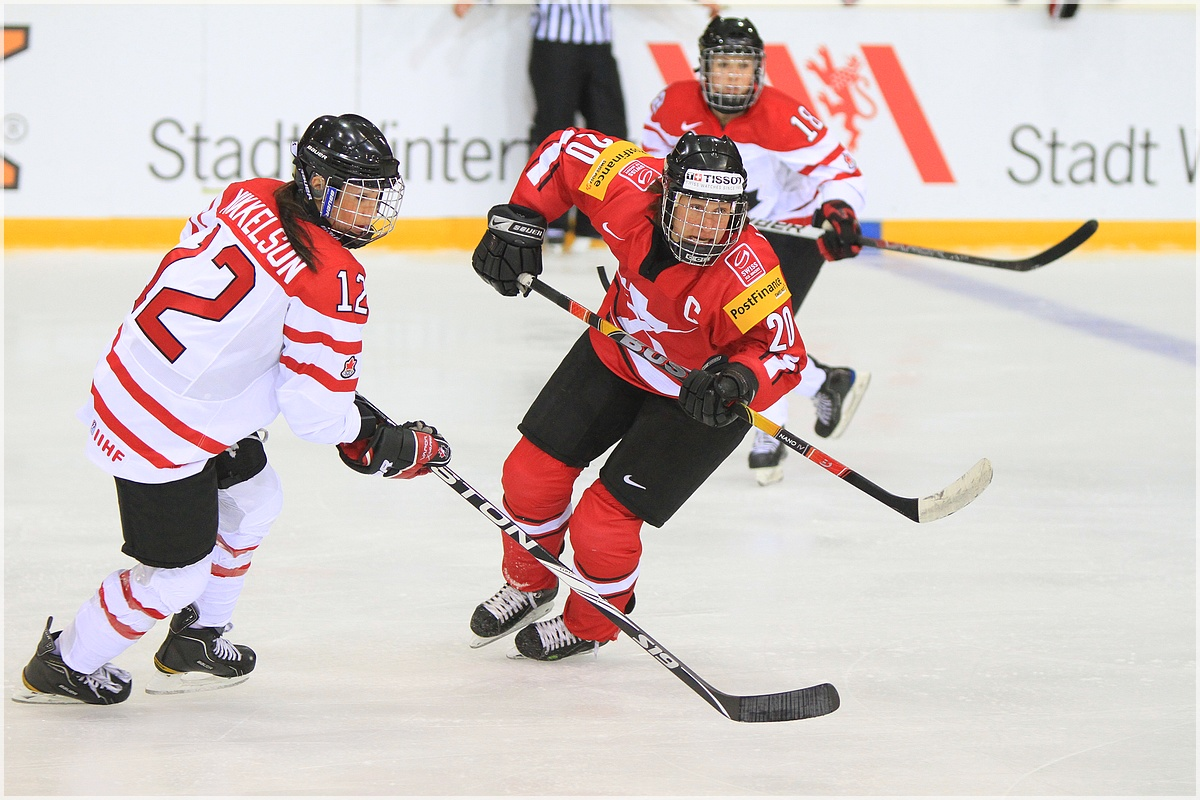
- Position: Forward
- Shot: Left
- Played for: ESC Planegg; AIK Hockey; SV Kornwestheim; EHC Illnau-Effretikon; Grasshopper Club Zürich
- National team: Switzerland
- Playing career: 1994–2024
- Coaching career: 2019–present

Sport
Association football career
- Position: Goalkeeper
Youth career
- 1989–1993: FC Küsnacht
College career
Years	Team	Apps	(Gls)
2003	Oklahoma State		
Senior career*
Years	Team	Apps	(Gls)
1993–1994	SV Seebach		
1995–1996	FC Rapperswil-Jona		
1997–1999	FC Schwerzenbach		
1999–2000	TuS Niederkirchen		
2000–2001	1. FFC Turbine Potsdam	20	(0)
2001–2003	FC Bayern Munich	29	(1)
2004–2007	FFC Wacker München	58	(2)
2007–2008	Hammarby IF	27	(0)
2009	FCR 2001 Duisburg	1	(0)
2010	FFC Wacker München	8	(0)
2010	FC Bayern Munich	2	(0)
International career
1994–1996	Switzerland U21		
1997–2005	Switzerland	32	(0)
- * Club domestic league appearances and goals
Medal record
Women's ice hockey
World Championship
Bronze medal – third place	2012 United States

Kathrin Margrit Lehmann (born 27 February 1980) is a Swiss-German member of the Swiss Ice Hockey Federation (SIHF) board of directors and a retired elite ice hockey forward and association football goalkeeper. She is the only sportswoman to have won the premier European cup competition in both ice hockey and association football.

== Ice hockey career ==
She most recently played with ESC Planegg of the Deutsche Fraueneishockey-Liga (DFEL) in the 2019–20 season.

=== International play ===
Lehmann was selected for the Switzerland national women's ice hockey team in the 2006 and 2010 Winter Olympics. In 2010, she served as captain, scoring two goals and six points. In 2006, she scored three goals and five points.

Lehmann has also appeared for Switzerland at ten IIHF Women's World Championships at two levels. Her first appearance came in 1997. She was a member of the bronze medal winning team at the 2012 championships.

=== Career statistics ===
==== International ====
Year	Team	Event	GP	G	A	Pts	PIM
1997	Switzerland	WW	5	1	0	1	8
1999	Switzerland	WW	5	1	0	1	2
2001	Switzerland	WW DI	4	3	2	5	0
2004	Switzerland	WW	4	0	0	0	0
2005	Switzerland	WW DI	5	3	4	7	6
2006	Switzerland	Oly	5	3	2	5	29
2007	Switzerland	WW	4	1	1	2	6
2008	Switzerland	WW	5	4	2	6	8
2009	Switzerland	WW	4	2	2	4	4
2010	Switzerland	Oly	5	2	4	6	0
2011	Switzerland	WW	5	0	1	1	2
2012	Switzerland	WW	6	2	3	5	4

== Association football career ==
Lehmann has played for a variety of football clubs in Germany and Sweden.
