= Janka Čulíková =

Slovak ice hockey player

- Born: June 30, 1987 (age 38); Martin, Czechoslovakia
- Height: 5 ft 6 in (168 cm)
- Weight: 128 lb (58 kg; 9 st 2 lb)
- Position: Forward
- Shoots: L
- National team: Slovakia
- Playing career: 2004–present

Janka Čulíková (born 30 June 1987 in Martin, Czechoslovakia) is a Slovak ice hockey forward.

== International career ==
Čulíková was selected for the Slovakia national women's ice hockey team in the 2010 Winter Olympics. She played in all five games, leading the team with two goals and three points. She played all three games of the qualifying campaign for the 2014 Olympics.

Čulíková has also appeared for Slovakia at eight IIHF Women's World Championships, across three levels. Her first appearance came in 2004. She appeared at the top level championships in 2011, 2012.

== Career statistics ==
=== International career ===
Year	Team	Event	GP	G	A	Pts	PIM
2004	Slovakia	WW DII	5	3	1	4	2
2005	Slovakia	WW DII	4	3	0	3	0
2007	Slovakia	WW DII	5	6	1	7	6
2008	Slovakia	WW DI	5	2	1	3	10
2009	Slovakia	WW DI	5	1	1	2	6
2010	Slovakia	Oly	5	2	1	3	6
2011	Slovakia	WW	5	0	0	0	2
2012	Slovakia	WW	5	0	0	0	4
2013	Slovakia	OlyQ	3	2	0	2	2
2013	Slovakia	WW DIA	5	0	2	2	8
