= Lajos Vákár Ice Hall =

Multipurpose hall in Romania

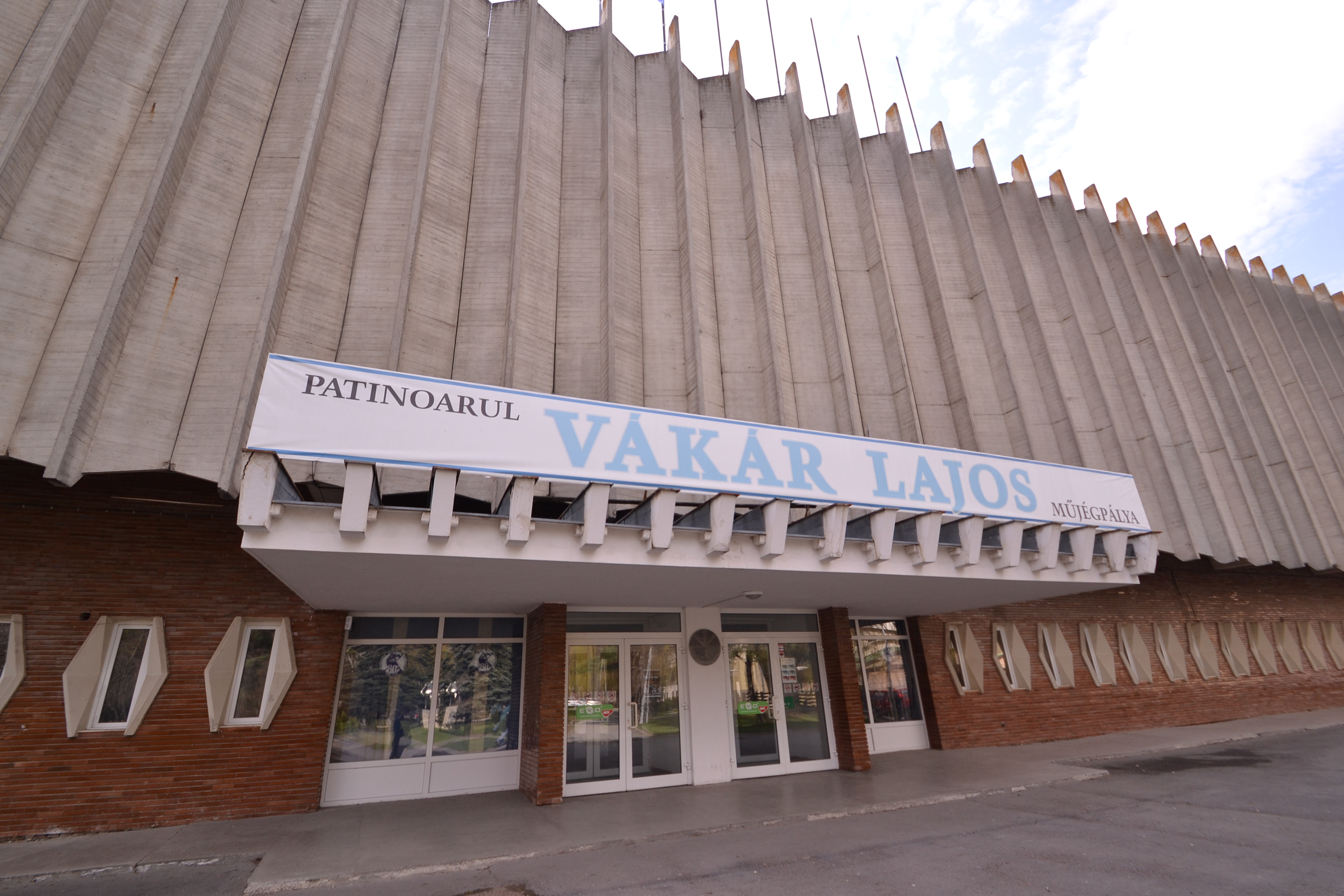
- Interactive map of Lajos Vákár Ice Hall
- Full name: Lajos Vákár Ice Hall
- Location: Miercurea Ciuc, Romania
- Coordinates: 46.357969°N 25.800330°E
- Capacity: 4,000
- Field size: 60 x 30

Construction
- Opened: 27 January 1971

Tenant
- HSC Csíkszereda

Lajos Vákár Ice Hall (Hungarian: Vákár Lajos Műjégpálya, Romanian: Patinoarul Lajos Vákár) is a multi-purpose hall in Miercurea Ciuc, Romania.

The arena is frequently used for concerts, indoor sports such as ice hockey, exhibitions and shows and it was also the host stadium of the 2007 IIHF World U20 Championship.

Next door to the arena is the Lajos Vákár artificial skate rink an outdoor speed skating oval constructed in 1952.

Since 1999 the arena bears the name of Lajos Vákár, a former ice hockey player and coach, one of the founding members of the hall's main tenant, HSC Csíkszereda.
