= List of Asian Games medalists in ice hockey =

This is the complete list of Asian Winter Games medalists in ice hockey from 1986 to 2025.

== Men ==
Games	Gold	Silver	Bronze
1986 Sapporo	China (CHN); Wang Yongjun; Zhang Yan; Wu Xing; Sun Jiaqing; Hu Yue; Huang Long; Wang Benyu; Zhang Zhinan; Tian Yujie; Chen Jingjie; Wang Fuping; Sun Huanwei; Sun Xiaodong; Zhang Zhiqiang; Wang Anfu; Zhao Danshi; Wang Hui; Liu Wenwu; Fu Zhenguo; Wei Lingyuan	Japan (JPN); Takeshi Iwamoto; Atsuo Kudo; Hayato Aoyama; Fumihiko Kajikawa; Tadashi Haga; Yuji Sugai; Katsutoshi Kawamura; Hidekatsu Takagi; Shuji Momoi; Sadaki Honma; Kenji Tanaka; Keiji Takahashi; Yoshio Hoshino; Toshiyuki Yajima; Norio Suzuki; Kazumi Unjo; Kiyotaka Terao; Toshiyuki Sakai; Takayuki Ueno; Motoki Ebina; Kenichi Suzuki; Masaki Hino	South Korea (KOR); Pyo Young-woon; Shin Seung-ho; Kim Sam-duk; Byun Sun-wook; Moon Joon-woong; Cho Chan-suk; Han Jung-hyun; Choi Won-sik; Hong Seok-bum; Baek Dong-won; Park Hyun-wook; Kim Jung-kyu; Baek Woon-seong; Kang Mo-hyun; Kim Hee-woo; Shim Bo-kwang; Yoon Sung-yup; Lee Kyung-hoon; Kim Jung-tae; Lee Jung-yong; Shin Sang-chul; Yun Heon-chul
1990 Sapporo	China (CHN); Zhang Yan; Wang Yongjun; Gao Chunlin; Sun Dehong; Zhang Zhenhua; Guan Xiaofang; Wang Benyu; Zhang Zhinan; Tian Yujie; Jin Xianxiu; Li Hongjun; Sui Xiaolei; Sun Xiaodong; Zhao Danshi; Wang Anfu; Ren Dong; Wang Hui; Liu Wenwu; Ji Weiguang; Wei Lingyun	Japan (JPN); Atsuo Kudo; Fumihiko Kajikawa; Tetsunobu Kadohashi; Hirotoshi Osawa; Toshiyuki Yajima; Yasuhiro Honma; Toshiyuki Sakai; Hidekatsu Takagi; Shuji Momoi; Akihito Sugisawa; Yuji Iwamoto; Hikomi Senuma; Sayaka Ishii; Koshi Kiyoe; Noriwaka Kadohashi; Yuji Iga; Homare Narita; Hiroshi Hikigi; Kenji Nobuta; Katsunori Hirano; Takayuki Miura; Tadashi Haga	South Korea (KOR); Yoon Sung-yup; Shin Seung-ho; Lee Ki-hoon; Song Ki-yong; Park Sung-joo; Han Jung-hyun; Lee Jae-hyuk; Kim Jae-hak; Shim Eui-sik; Lee Kang-su; Seo Tae-seok; Byun Sun-jin; Park Hyun-wook; Choi Min-seok; Lee Dong-ho; Pyo Young-woon; Oh Jae-won; Shin Hyun-dae; Lee Dong-ho; No Jung-won; Hong Jong-sung; Kim Kwan-sung
1996 Harbin	Kazakhstan (KAZ); Vladimir Borodulin; Vladimir Antipin; Sergey Kislitsyn; Andrey Savenkov; Igor Medvedev; Oleg Kovalenko; Vladimir Zavyalov; Andrey Raiskiy; Andrey Singeleyev; Andrey Pchelyakov; Sergey Antipov; Andrey Samokhvalov; Anatoliy Filatov; Dmitriy Dudarev; Vitaliy Yeremeyev; Sergey Mogilnikov; Yerlan Sagymbayev; Boris Alexandrov; Viktor Fedorchenko; Alexandr Filippov	Japan (JPN); Shinichi Iwasaki; Atsuo Kudo; Takeshi Yamanaka; Takayuki Kobori; Yujiro Nakajimaya; Tatsuki Katayama; Masaki Shirono; Akihito Sugisawa; Norio Suzuki; Koji Masukawa; Koshi Kiyoe; Makoto Kawahira; Yuji Iga; Kunihiko Sakurai; Shin Yahata; Hiroshi Matsuura; Naoki Mano; Taro Nihei	China (CHN); Zhang Liqun; Liu Xue; Tang Yongjun; Guan Xiaofang; Liu Feng; Qi Zhong; Gao Hongqun; Wang Zhanyong; Chen Guanghua; Guan Xiaobo; Liu Jiuming; Zhai Mengyuan; Zhang Shousheng; Pan Yuqiang; Huang Meng; Tan Ke; Yu Lei; Wu Guofeng; Yu Xahien; Geng Hua; Li Xingzhou; Luo Lei; Sun Honglei
1999 Gangwon	Kazakhstan (KAZ); Roman Krivomazov; Vitaliy Novopashin; Viktor Bystryantsev; Vitaliy Tregubov; Denis Shemelin; Alexey Litvinenko; Igor Nikitin; Alexandr Gasnikov; Petr Devyatkin; Salim Prmanov; Andrey Trochshinskiy; Anatoliy Filatov; Yerlan Sagymbayev; Sergey Alexandrov; Nikolay Zarzhytskiy; Rustam Yessirkenov; Sergey Ogureshnikov; Anton Komissarov; Sergey Nevstruyev; Nik Antropov; Dmitriy Upper; Maxim Komissarov; Kirill Zinovyev	Japan (JPN); Akihito Isojima; Fumitaka Miyauchi; Nobuhiro Sugawara; Yasunori Iwata; Yutaka Kawaguchi; Masaki Shirono; Hideji Tsuchida; Hiroyuki Murakami; Kevin Kimura; Takeshi Yamanaka; Kunihiko Sakurai; Akira Ihara; Daniel Daikawa; Shin Yahata; Junji Sakata; Masahisa Sarodo; Kiyoshi Fujita; Kengo Ito; Junichi Takahashi; Masahito Haruna; Ryan Kuwabara; Chris Yule; Masakazu Sato	China (CHN); Liu Xue; Liu Wen; Wang Dahai; Yin Kai; Zhao Liang; Liu Lei; Pan Zhiqiang; Wang Zhanyong; Chen Guanghua; Liu Jiuming; Zhang Shousheng; Pan Yuqiang; Wu Guofeng; Liu Henan; Luo Lei; Su Yao; Geng Hua; Zhao Weidong; Fu Lei; Meng Xiangsen; Zhang Lei; Wang Yang
2003 Aomori	Japan (JPN); Akihito Sugisawa; Fumitaka Miyauchi; Makoto Kawashima; Joel Dyck; Robert Miwa; Yutaka Kawaguchi; Tomohiko Uchiyama; Yosuke Kon; Daisuke Obara; Tetsuya Saito; Masatoshi Ito; Takeshi Saito; Makoto Kawahira; Jiro Nihei; Daniel Daikawa; Kengo Ito; Naoya Kikuchi; Kiyoshi Fujita; Taro Nihei; Yoshikazu Kabayama; Koichi Yamazaki; Masahito Haruna; Ryan Kuwabara	Kazakhstan (KAZ); Alexandr Shimin; Vitaliy Tregubov; Vadim Rifel; Andrey Trochshinskiy; Nikolay Zarzhytskiy; Andrey Ogorodnikov; Denis Shemelin; Anton Komissarov; Maxim Komissarov; Roman Kozlov; Rustam Yessirkenov; Fedor Polishchuk; Sergey Tambulov; Oleg Kovalenko; Roman Shipulin; Andrey Savenkov; Oleg Kryazhev; Sergey Alexandrov; Artyom Argokov; Sergey Antipov; Sergey Nevstruyev; Yevgeniy Kuzmin; Kirill Zinovyev	China (CHN); Liu Xue; Liu Wen; Wang Dahai; Yin Kai; Sui Hongchao; Chen Guanghua; Li Qingming; Liu Yongquan; Ma Hang; Pan Yuqiang; Wu Guofeng; Liu Henan; Su Hongbin; Su Yao; Lang Bingyu; Jin Tairi; Meng Xiangsen; Zhang Lei; Du Chao; Luo Lei; Zhou Yudi; Geng Hua; Sun Peng
2007 Changchun	Japan (JPN); Masahito Haruna; Jun Tonosaki; Kengo Ito; Fumitaka Miyauchi; Yosuke Kon; Sho Sato; Toru Kamino; Masahito Nishiwaki; Go Tanaka; Daisuke Obara; Yoshinori Iimura; Takahito Suzuki; Takeshi Saito; Shinya Yanadori; Hideyuki Osawa; Ryuichi Kawai; Akifumi Okuyama; Tetsuya Saito; Masato Domeki; Mitsuaki Inoue; Naoya Kikuchi; Masahiro Kawamura	Kazakhstan (KAZ); Yevgeniy Mazunin; Alexey Korshkov; Andrey Trochshinskiy; Vadim Rifel; Talgat Zhailauov; Alexandr Koreshkov; Oleg Yeremeyev; Yevgeniy Koreshkov; Alexey Gubarev; Oleg Kovalenko; Andrey Ogorodnikov; Lev Krutokhvostov; Anton Komissarov; Maxim Komissarov; Andrey Savenkov; Sergey Miroshnichenko; Sergey Alexandrov; Sergey Ogureshnikov; Yevgeniy Ushkov; Konstantin Kassatkin; Artyom Argokov; Sergey Yakovenko	South Korea (KOR); Park Woo-sang; Yoon Kyung-won; Lee Kwon-joon; Kim Hong-il; Hong Hyun-mok; Suh Sin-il; Choi Jung-sik; Kim Han-sung; Lee Myung-woo; Kim Yoon-hwan; Hwang Byung-wook; Lee Yong-jun; Kim Kyu-hun; Jeon Jin-ho; Kim Ki-sung; Son Ho-seung; Oh Hyon-ho; Kim Kyung-tae; Lee Kwon-jae; Park Sung-min; Eum Hyun-seung
2011 Astana–Almaty	Kazakhstan (KAZ); Vitaliy Yeremeyev; Roman Savchenko; Vitaliy Novopashin; Alexey Litvinenko; Maxim Semenov; Talgat Zhailauov; Yevgeniy Blokhin; Dmitriy Upper; Vitaliy Kolesnik; Ilya Solarev; Fedor Polishchuk; Dmitriy Dudarev; Maxim Belyayev; Yevgeniy Bumagin; Alexey Vassilchenko; Ivan Poloshkov; Andrey Gavrilin; Yevgeniy Fadeyev; Roman Starchenko; Maxim Khudyakov; Alexey Koledayev; Vadim Krasnoslobodtsev; Yevgeniy Rymarev	Japan (JPN); Jun Tonosaki; Aaron Keller; Makoto Kawashima; Masato Domeki; Yosuke Kon; Masahito Suzuki; Masahito Nishiwaki; Yosuke Haga; Masafumi Ogawa; Go Tanaka; Takahito Suzuki; Takeshi Saito; Takafumi Yamashita; Shuhei Kuji; Hideyuki Osawa; Hiroki Ueno; Bin Ishioka; Takuma Kawai; Yutaka Fukufuji; Masahito Haruna; Shinya Yanadori	South Korea (KOR); Park Sung-je; Lee Don-ku; Kim Woo-jae; Ahn Hyun-min; Kim Dong-hwan; Kim Won-jung; Cho Min-ho; Kim Yoon-hwan; Kim Ki-sung; Kim Sang-wook; Suh Sin-il; Lee Yong-jun; Kwon Tae-an; Kim Kyu-hun; Kim Geun-ho; Choi Jung-sik; Shin Sang-woo; Song Dong-hwan; Kim Hyun-soo; Park Woo-sang; Kim Hyeok; Eum Hyun-seung
2017 Sapporo	Kazakhstan (KAZ); Anton Kazantsev; Georgiy Dulnev; Madiyar Ibraibekov; Alexandr Kurshuk; Artemiy Lakiza; Kirill Savitskiy; Anton Sagadeyev; Nikita Mikhailis; Ilya Kovzalov; Alexey Antsiferov; Stanislav Zinchenko; Yaroslav Yevdokimov; Alikhan Assetov; Konstantin Savenkov; Ilgiz Nuriyev; Sergey Kudryavtsev; Nursultan Belgibayev; Ivan Stepanenko; Anton Petrov; Maxim Volkov; Dmitriy Grents; Vitaliy Kolesnik	South Korea (KOR); Matt Dalton; Seo Yeong-jun; Bryan Young; Kim Won-jun; Kim Yoon-hwan; Cho Min-ho; Michael Swift; Kim Ki-sung; Oh Hyon-ho; Jeon Jung-woo; Shin Sang-woo; Lee Don-ku; Shin Sang-hoon; Kim Won-jung; Kim Sang-wook; Lee Chong-hyun; Park Jin-kyu; Mike Testwuide; Eric Regan; Park Woo-sang; Shin Hyung-yun; Park Kye-hoon; Park Sung-je	Japan (JPN); Takuto Onoda; Mei Ushu; Keigo Minoshima; Ryo Hashiba; Ryo Hashimoto; Seiji Takahashi; Kenta Takagi; Takuma Kawai; Masahito Nishiwaki; Hiroto Sato; Hiromichi Terao; Go Tanaka; Kohei Mitamura; Makuru Furuhashi; Takafumi Yamashita; Shuhei Kuji; Yuri Terao; Yosuke Haga; Yushiro Hirano; Hiroki Ueno; Takuro Yamashita; Yutaka Fukufuji; Yuto Ito
2025 Harbin	Kazakhstan (KAZ); Jelaladdin Amirbekov; Dmitriy Breus; Tamirlan Gaitamirov; Andrey Buyalskiy; Samat Daniyar; Ruslan Ospanov; Danil Butenko; Alikhan Omirbekov; Artyom Korolyov; Alexandr Borissevich; Roman Starchenko; Yevgeniy Rymarev; Dmitriy Grents; Andrey Shutov; Vyacheslav Kolesnikov; Kirill Panyukov; Denis Chaporov; Kirill Savitskiy; Ivan Stepanenko; Eduard Mikhailov; Artyom Likhotnikov; Adil Beketayev; Maxim Pavlenko	Japan (JPN); Yuta Narisawa; Seiya Hayata; Koki Yoneyama; Jiei Halliday; Kotaro Yamada; Kotaro Tsutsumi; Riku Ishida; Kenta Takagi; Toi Kobayashi; Kosuke Otsu; Hiroto Sato; Masato Okubo; Yuto Osawa; Taiga Irikura; Shigeki Hitosato; Makuru Furuhashi; Shogo Nakajima; Yusei Otsu; Kento Suzuki; Sota Isogai; Kazuki Lawlor; Issa Otsuka; Eiki Sato	South Korea (KOR); Lee Seung-jae; Kim Won-jun; Oh In-gyo; Kim Sang-yeob; Kim Si-hwan; Kong Yu-chan; Kim Sang-wook; Lee Min-jae; Kim Dong-hwan; Ahn Jin-hui; Ha Jung-ho; Lee Yeon-seung; Jeon Jung-woo; Nam Hee-doo; Lim Dong-kyu; Kwon Hyeon-su; Kim Geon-woo; Lee Chong-min; Lee Hyun-seung; Lee Moo-young; Kang Min-wan; Kang Yoon-seok

== Women ==
Games	Gold	Silver	Bronze
1996 Harbin	China (CHN); Chen Jing; Dang Hong; Diao Ying; Gong Ming; Guo Hong; Guo Wei; Hu Yuqin; Huo Lina; Li Xuan; Liu Hongjiao; Liu Hongmei; Lü Yan; Ma Jinping; Ma Xiaojun; Sang Hong; Song Kunfeng; Wang Wei; Xu Lei; Yang Xiuqing; Zhang Haiyan; Zhang Jing; Zhang Lan; Zheng Jianhua	Japan (JPN)	Kazakhstan (KAZ)
1999 Gangwon	China (CHN); Huo Lina; Zhang Haiyan; Liu Hongmei; Li Xuan; Li Yanan; Lü Yan; Yu Xiaolin; Yang Xiuqing; Sang Hong; Chen Jing; Hu Chunrong; Diao Ying; Zhang Jing; Sun Rui; Xu Lei; Guo Lili; Wang Wei; Ma Xiaojun; Wang Linuo; Guo Hong	Japan (JPN); Yuka Oda; Haruka Watanabe; Rie Sato; Akiko Hatanaka; Maiko Obikawa; Naho Yoshimi; Yuko Osanai; Yoko Kondo; Masako Sato; Mitsuko Igarashi; Hanae Kubo; Aki Sudo; Yuki Togawa; Aki Tsuchida; Akiko Naka; Yoko Tamada; Yukari Ono; Etsuko Wada; Ayumi Sato	Kazakhstan (KAZ); Anna Akimbetyeva; Natalya Skobelkina; Oxana Taikevich; Yelena Shtelmaister; Lyubov Vafina; Olessya Mukomelo; Marina Kurganova; Olga Potapova; Viktoriya Adiyeva; Yelena Agapitova; Dinara Dikambayeva; Svetlana Echtchenko; Natalya Yakovchuk; Olga Kryukova; Anna Skripnikova; Svetlana Maltseva; Mariya Prokopyeva
2003 Aomori	Kazakhstan (KAZ); Viktoriya Adiyeva; Lyubov Alexeyeva; Mariya Atarskaya; Dinara Dikambayeva; Olga Konysheva; Olga Kryukova; Yelena Kuznetsova; Svetlana Maltseva; Yekaterina Maltseva; Vera Nazyrova; Yekaterina Ryzhova; Viktoriya Sazonova; Yelena Shtelmaister; Yuliya Solovyova; Natalya Trunova; Lyubov Vafina; Svetlana Vassina; Natalya Yakovchuk	Japan (JPN); Fumiko Tsujimoto; Haruna Kumano; Etsuko Wada; Asako Kanno; Kumiko Aoki; Yuko Osanai; Yoko Kondo; Tomoko Sakagami; Hanae Kubo; Sayaka Sado; Masako Sato; Yoko Tamada; Yuki Togawa; Aki Tsuchida; Yuka Hirano; Tomoko Fujimoto; Chiaki Yamanaka; Shoko Nihonyanagi; Akiko Naka; Ami Mashiko; Taeko Kakumaru	China (CHN); Chen Jing; Dai Qiuwa; Guan Weinan; Jia Dandan; Jiang Limei; Jin Fengling; Li Xiuli; Li Xuan; Li Xuefei; Liu Yanhui; Lü Yan; Ma Xiaojun; Shen Tiantian; Su Ziwei; Sun Rui; Wang Linuo; Wang Ying; Yang Xiuqing; Zhang Ben; Zhang Jing
2007 Changchun	Kazakhstan (KAZ); Darya Obydennova; Xeniya Yelfimova; Alexandra Babushkina; Galina Shu; Lyubov Ibragimova; Olga Potapova; Tatyana Shtelmaister; Zarina Tukhtiyeva; Viktoriya Adiyeva; Larissa Sviridova; Yevgeniya Ivchenko; Olga Kryukova; Yekaterina Ryzhova; Viktoriya Sazonova; Albina Suprun; Tatyana Koroleva; Alena Fux; Vera Nazyrova; Svetlana Maltseva; Svetlana Vassina	Japan (JPN); Azusa Nakaoku; Haruna Kumano; Yoko Kondo; Emi Nonaka; Etsuko Wada; Tomoe Yamane; Ami Mashiko; Yuki Togawa; Yurie Adachi; Aki Fujii; Shoko Nihonyanagi; Yae Kawashima; Moemi Nakamura; Yuka Hirano; Tomoko Sakagami; Yoko Otani; Hanae Kubo; Chiaki Yamanaka; Kanae Aoki; Nana Fujimoto	China (CHN); Huo Lina; Yu Baiwei; Su Ziwei; Li Xiuli; Fu Yue; Sang Hong; Zhang Ben; Huang Haijing; Jin Fengling; Ding Xiaolin; Sun Rui; Ma Rui; Cui Shanshan; Wang Linuo; Jiang Na; Tan Anqi; Zhang Jing; Wang Nan; Gao Fujin; Shi Yao; Qi Xueting; Zhang Shuang
2011 Astana–Almaty	Kazakhstan (KAZ); Aizhan Raushanova; Galina Shu; Lyubov Ibragimova; Olga Potapova; Yelena Shtelmaister; Zarina Tukhtiyeva; Viktoriya Mussatayeva; Larissa Sviridova; Galiya Nurgaliyeva; Olga Konysheva; Olga Kryukova; Natalya Yakovchuk; Darya Obydennova; Viktoriya Sazonova; Tatyana Koroleva; Albina Suprun; Anna Kossenko; Alena Fux; Mariya Topkayeva; Alexandra Ashikhina; Natalya Trunova; Anastassiya Orlova	Japan (JPN); Azusa Nakaoku; Shiori Koike; Yoko Kondo; Nachi Fujimoto; Kanae Aoki; Sena Suzuki; Mika Hori; Tomoe Yamane; Mai Morii; Haruna Yoneyama; Yurie Adachi; Chiho Osawa; Moeko Fujimoto; Tomo Eguchi; Saki Shimozawa; Yuka Hirano; Tomoko Sakagami; Shizuka Takahashi; Miho Shishiuchi; Ami Nakamura; Nodoka Abe	China (CHN); Han Danni; Yu Baiwei; Kong Minghui; Lou Yue; Liu Zhixin; Zhang Mengying; Wang Nan; Zhang Ben; Huang Haijing; Jin Fengling; Sun Rui; Ma Rui; Cui Shanshan; Jiang Na; Huo Cui; Fang Xin; Tang Liang; Gao Fujin; Shi Yao; Qi Xueting; Zhang Shuang
2017 Sapporo	Japan (JPN); Nana Fujimoto; Shiori Koike; Ayaka Toko; Sena Suzuki; Mika Hori; Akane Hosoyamada; Aina Takeuchi; Haruna Yoneyama; Yurie Adachi; Chiho Osawa; Moeko Fujimoto; Haruka Toko; Rui Ukita; Naho Terashima; Hanae Kubo; Tomomi Iwahara; Ami Nakamura; Yoshino Enomoto; Shoko Ono; Mai Kondo; Akane Konishi	China (CHN); He Siye; Yu Baiwei; Zhu Rui; Tian Naiyuan; Liu Zhixin; Zhang Mengying; Deng Di; Zhang Chi; Ju Jingwen; Lu Shuang; Wang Chang; Zhao Qinan; Guan Yingying; Kong Minghui; Jiang Bowen; Lü Yue; Wen Lu; He Xin; Jiang Yue; Fang Xin; Wang Yuqing	Kazakhstan (KAZ); Aizhan Raushanova; Madina Tursynova; Pernesh Ashimova; Malika Aldabergenova; Azhar Khamimuldinova; Bulbul Kartanbayeva; Alena Fux; Aray Shegebayeva; Zarina Tukhtiyeva; Meruyert Ryspek; Tatyana Likhaus; Anastassiya Orlova; Galiya Nurgaliyeva; Olga Konysheva; Alexandra Feklistova; Karina Felzink; Darya Dmitriyeva; Viktoriya Sazonova; Aida Olzhabayeva; Tatyana Koroleva; Arina Chshyokolova
2025 Harbin	Japan (JPN); Riko Kawaguchi; Shiori Koike; Aoi Shiga; Shiori Yamashita; Kohane Sato; Kanami Seki; Akane Hosoyamada; Hikaru Yamashita; Rui Ukita; Yoshino Enomoto; Wakana Kurosu; Suzuka Maeda; Makoto Ito; Haruka Kuromaru; Remi Koyama; Rio Noro; Mei Miura; Riri Noro; Yumeka Wajima; Ai Tada; Miyuu Masuhara	Kazakhstan (KAZ); Zlatotsveta Feoktistova; Alexandra Voronova; Munira Sayakhatkyzy; Katrin Meskini; Malika Aldabergenova; Pernesh Ashimova; Nadezhda Filimonova; Dariya Moldabay; Alexandra Shegay; Polina Yakovleva; Dilnaz Sayakhatkyzy; Madina Tursynova; Larissa Sviridova; Anna Pyatkova; Aida Olzhabayeva; Anastassiya Orazbayeva; Alina Ivanchenko; Arina Chshyokolova; Yuliya Butorina; Sofiya Zubkova; Tatyana Koroleva; Yekaterina Kutsenko; Polina Govtva	China (CHN); Yu Baiwei; Zhang Mengying; Kong Minghui; Wu Sijia; Zhao Qinan; Hu Jiayi; Qu Yue; Du Sijia; Liu Siyang; Fang Xin; Wang Jiaxin; Liu Chunshuang; Guan Yingying; Yang Jinglei; Wang Yuqing; Zhang Biyang; Li Yiming; Lai Guimin; Gao Ziye; Li Qianhua; Zhao Ziyu; Wen Lu; Zhu Rui
