= Ice hockey at the 1999 Asian Winter Games =

- Venue: Gangneung Indoor Ice Rink
- Dates: 30 January – 6 February 1999
- Nations: 6

Ice hockey at the 1999 Asian Winter Games took place in the Gangneung Indoor Ice Rink and the city of Gangneung, Gangwon, South Korea with men's and women's events contested.

== Schedule ==
●	Round	P	Preliminary round	●	Final round	●	Last round

Event↓/Date →	30th Sat	31st Sun	1st Mon	2nd Tue	3rd Wed	4th Thu	5th Fri	6th Sat
Men		P	P	P	P		●	●
Women	●	●	●	●		●		

== Medalists ==
Event	Gold	Silver	Bronze
Men	Kazakhstan; Roman Krivomazov; Vitaliy Novopashin; Viktor Bystryantsev; Vitaliy Tregubov; Denis Shemelin; Alexey Litvinenko; Igor Nikitin; Alexandr Gasnikov; Petr Devyatkin; Salim Prmanov; Andrey Trochshinskiy; Anatoliy Filatov; Yerlan Sagymbayev; Sergey Alexandrov; Nikolay Zarzhytskiy; Rustam Yessirkenov; Sergey Ogureshnikov; Anton Komissarov; Sergey Nevstruyev; Nik Antropov; Dmitriy Upper; Maxim Komissarov; Kirill Zinovyev	Japan; Akihito Isojima; Fumitaka Miyauchi; Nobuhiro Sugawara; Yasunori Iwata; Yutaka Kawaguchi; Masaki Shirono; Hideji Tsuchida; Hiroyuki Murakami; Kevin Kimura; Takeshi Yamanaka; Kunihiko Sakurai; Akira Ihara; Daniel Daikawa; Shin Yahata; Junji Sakata; Masahisa Sarodo; Kiyoshi Fujita; Kengo Ito; Junichi Takahashi; Masahito Haruna; Ryan Kuwabara; Chris Yule; Masakazu Sato	China; Liu Xue; Liu Wen; Wang Dahai; Yin Kai; Zhao Liang; Liu Lei; Pan Zhiqiang; Wang Zhanyong; Chen Guanghua; Liu Jiuming; Zhang Shousheng; Pan Yuqiang; Wu Guofeng; Liu Henan; Luo Lei; Su Yao; Geng Hua; Zhao Weidong; Fu Lei; Meng Xiangsen; Zhang Lei; Wang Yang
Women	China; Huo Lina; Zhang Haiyan; Liu Hongmei; Li Xuan; Li Yanan; Lü Yan; Yu Xiaolin; Yang Xiuqing; Sang Hong; Chen Jing; Hu Chunrong; Diao Ying; Zhang Jing; Sun Rui; Xu Lei; Guo Lili; Wang Wei; Ma Xiaojun; Wang Linuo; Guo Hong	Japan; Yuka Oda; Haruka Watanabe; Rie Sato; Akiko Hatanaka; Maiko Obikawa; Naho Yoshimi; Yuko Osanai; Yoko Kondo; Masako Sato; Mitsuko Igarashi; Hanae Kubo; Aki Sudo; Yuki Togawa; Aki Tsuchida; Akiko Naka; Yoko Tamada; Yukari Ono; Etsuko Wada; Ayumi Sato	Kazakhstan; Anna Akimbetyeva; Natalya Skobelkina; Oxana Taikevich; Yelena Shtelmaister; Lyubov Vafina; Olessya Mukomelo; Marina Kurganova; Olga Potapova; Viktoriya Adiyeva; Yelena Agapitova; Dinara Dikambayeva; Svetlana Echtchenko; Natalya Yakovchuk; Olga Kryukova; Anna Skripnikova; Svetlana Maltseva; Mariya Prokopyeva

== Medal table ==
Rank	Nation	Gold	Silver	Bronze	Total
1	China (CHN)	1	0	1	2
1	Kazakhstan (KAZ)	1	0	1	2
3	Japan (JPN)	0	2	0	2
Totals (3 entries)		2	2	2	6

== Final standing ==
=== Men ===
Rank	Team	Pld	W	D	L
1st place, gold medalist(s)	Kazakhstan	4	3	1	0
2nd place, silver medalist(s)	Japan	4	3	1	0
3rd place, bronze medalist(s)	China	4	2	0	2
4	South Korea	4	1	0	3
5	Mongolia	3	1	0	2
6	Kuwait	3	0	0	3

=== Women ===
Rank	Team	Pld	W	D	L
1st place, gold medalist(s)	China	3	3	0	0
2nd place, silver medalist(s)	Japan	3	2	0	1
3rd place, bronze medalist(s)	Kazakhstan	3	1	0	2
4	South Korea	3	0	0	3
