= Ice hockey at the 2003 Asian Winter Games =

- Venue: Misawa Ice Arena; Niida Indoor Rink
- Dates: 30 January – 7 February 2003
- Nations: 7

Ice hockey was featured as part of the 2003 Asian Winter Games.

Japan won the men's event by defeating all of the other teams, Kazakhstan also won all its games until they lost the final game to Japan. China took third position after beating South Korea. Thailand got fifth place and Mongolia got sixth place after losing all its games.

In women's ice hockey, Kazakhstan won all its games and the gold medal, in a league system with five teams playing. Japan won the silver medal, and China the bronze. North Korea took fourth place and South Korea was in fifth place.

== Schedule ==
●	Round	●	Last round	P	Preliminary round	½	Semifinals	F	Finals

Event↓/Date →	30th Thu	31st Fri	1st Sat	2nd Sun	3rd Mon	4th Tue	5th Wed	6th Thu	7th Fri
Men				P	P	P		½	F
Women	●	●		●	●		●		

== Medalists ==
Event	Gold	Silver	Bronze
Men	Japan; Akihito Sugisawa; Fumitaka Miyauchi; Makoto Kawashima; Joel Dyck; Robert Miwa; Yutaka Kawaguchi; Tomohiko Uchiyama; Yosuke Kon; Daisuke Obara; Tetsuya Saito; Masatoshi Ito; Takeshi Saito; Makoto Kawahira; Jiro Nihei; Daniel Daikawa; Kengo Ito; Naoya Kikuchi; Kiyoshi Fujita; Taro Nihei; Yoshikazu Kabayama; Koichi Yamazaki; Masahito Haruna; Ryan Kuwabara	Kazakhstan; Alexandr Shimin; Vitaliy Tregubov; Vadim Rifel; Andrey Trochshinskiy; Nikolay Zarzhytskiy; Andrey Ogorodnikov; Denis Shemelin; Anton Komissarov; Maxim Komissarov; Roman Kozlov; Rustam Yessirkenov; Fedor Polishchuk; Sergey Tambulov; Oleg Kovalenko; Roman Shipulin; Andrey Savenkov; Oleg Kryazhev; Sergey Alexandrov; Artyom Argokov; Sergey Antipov; Sergey Nevstruyev; Yevgeniy Kuzmin; Kirill Zinovyev	China; Liu Xue; Liu Wen; Wang Dahai; Yin Kai; Sui Hongchao; Chen Guanghua; Li Qingming; Liu Yongquan; Ma Hang; Pan Yuqiang; Wu Guofeng; Liu Henan; Su Hongbin; Su Yao; Lang Bingyu; Jin Tairi; Meng Xiangsen; Zhang Lei; Du Chao; Luo Lei; Zhou Yudi; Geng Hua; Sun Peng
Women	Kazakhstan; Viktoriya Adiyeva; Lyubov Alexeyeva; Mariya Atarskaya; Dinara Dikambayeva; Olga Konysheva; Olga Kryukova; Yelena Kuznetsova; Svetlana Maltseva; Yekaterina Maltseva; Vera Nazyrova; Yekaterina Ryzhova; Viktoriya Sazonova; Yelena Shtelmaister; Yuliya Solovyova; Natalya Trunova; Lyubov Vafina; Svetlana Vassina; Natalya Yakovchuk	Japan; Fumiko Tsujimoto; Haruna Kumano; Etsuko Wada; Asako Kanno; Kumiko Aoki; Yuko Osanai; Yoko Kondo; Tomoko Sakagami; Hanae Kubo; Sayaka Sado; Masako Sato; Yoko Tamada; Yuki Togawa; Aki Tsuchida; Yuka Hirano; Tomoko Fujimoto; Chiaki Yamanaka; Shoko Nihonyanagi; Akiko Naka; Ami Mashiko; Taeko Kakumaru	China; Chen Jing; Dai Qiuwa; Guan Weinan; Jia Dandan; Jiang Limei; Jin Fengling; Li Xiuli; Li Xuan; Li Xuefei; Liu Yanhui; Lü Yan; Ma Xiaojun; Shen Tiantian; Su Ziwei; Sun Rui; Wang Linuo; Wang Ying; Yang Xiuqing; Zhang Ben; Zhang Jing

== Medal table ==
Rank	Nation	Gold	Silver	Bronze	Total
1	Japan (JPN)	1	1	0	2
1	Kazakhstan (KAZ)	1	1	0	2
3	China (CHN)	0	0	2	2
Totals (3 entries)		2	2	2	6

== Final standing ==
=== Men ===
Rank	Team	Pld	W	D	L
1st place, gold medalist(s)	Japan	4	4	0	0
2nd place, silver medalist(s)	Kazakhstan	4	3	0	1
3rd place, bronze medalist(s)	China	4	2	0	2
4	South Korea	4	1	0	3
5	Thailand	3	1	0	2
6	Mongolia	3	0	0	3

=== Women ===
Rank	Team	Pld	W	D	L
1st place, gold medalist(s)	Kazakhstan	4	3	1	0
2nd place, silver medalist(s)	Japan	4	3	0	1
3rd place, bronze medalist(s)	China	4	2	1	1
4	North Korea	4	1	0	3
5	South Korea	4	0	0	4
