= Ice hockey at the 1996 Asian Winter Games =

- Venue: Baqu Arena
- Dates: 5–8 February 1996
- Nations: 4

Ice hockey at the 1996 Asian Winter Games took place in the city of Harbin, China. The spot for the North Korea team, which did not participate, was filled with Kazakhstan's entry into this Winter Asiad. This edition also marks the introduction of women's ice hockey event to the Winter Asian Games.

== Schedule ==
●	Round	●	Last round

Event↓/Date →	5th Mon	6th Tue	7th Wed	8th Thu
Men	●	●		●
Women	●	●		●

== Medalists ==
Event	Gold	Silver	Bronze
Men	Kazakhstan; Vladimir Borodulin; Vladimir Antipin; Sergey Kislitsyn; Andrey Savenkov; Igor Medvedev; Oleg Kovalenko; Vladimir Zavyalov; Andrey Raiskiy; Andrey Singeleyev; Andrey Pchelyakov; Sergey Antipov; Andrey Samokhvalov; Anatoliy Filatov; Dmitriy Dudarev; Vitaliy Yeremeyev; Sergey Mogilnikov; Yerlan Sagymbayev; Boris Alexandrov; Viktor Fedorchenko; Alexandr Filippov	Japan; Shinichi Iwasaki; Atsuo Kudo; Takeshi Yamanaka; Takayuki Kobori; Yujiro Nakajimaya; Tatsuki Katayama; Masaki Shirono; Akihito Sugisawa; Norio Suzuki; Koji Masukawa; Koshi Kiyoe; Makoto Kawahira; Yuji Iga; Kunihiko Sakurai; Shin Yahata; Hiroshi Matsuura; Naoki Mano; Taro Nihei	China; Zhang Liqun; Liu Xue; Tang Yongjun; Guan Xiaofang; Liu Feng; Qi Zhong; Gao Hongqun; Wang Zhanyong; Chen Guanghua; Guan Xiaobo; Liu Jiuming; Zhai Mengyuan; Zhang Shousheng; Pan Yuqiang; Huang Meng; Tan Ke; Yu Lei; Wu Guofeng; Yu Xahien; Geng Hua; Li Xingzhou; Luo Lei; Sun Honglei
Women	China; Chen Jing; Dang Hong; Diao Ying; Gong Ming; Guo Hong; Guo Wei; Hu Yuqin; Huo Lina; Li Xuan; Liu Hongjiao; Liu Hongmei; Lü Yan; Ma Jinping; Ma Xiaojun; Sang Hong; Song Kunfeng; Wang Wei; Xu Lei; Yang Xiuqing; Zhang Haiyan; Zhang Jing; Zhang Lan; Zheng Jianhua	Japan	Kazakhstan

== Medal table ==
Rank	Nation	Gold	Silver	Bronze	Total
1	China (CHN)	1	0	1	2
1	Kazakhstan (KAZ)	1	0	1	2
3	Japan (JPN)	0	2	0	2
Totals (3 entries)		2	2	2	6

== Final standing ==
=== Men ===
Rank	Team	Pld	W	D	L
1st place, gold medalist(s)	Kazakhstan	3	3	0	0
2nd place, silver medalist(s)	Japan	3	2	0	1
3rd place, bronze medalist(s)	China	3	1	0	2
4	South Korea	3	0	0	3

=== Women ===
Rank	Team	Pld	W	D	L
1st place, gold medalist(s)	China	2	2	0	0
2nd place, silver medalist(s)	Japan	2	1	0	1
3rd place, bronze medalist(s)	Kazakhstan	2	0	0	2
