= Ice hockey at the Asian Winter Games =

- Governing bodies: IIHF (World)
- Events: 2 (men: 1; women: 1)

Games
- 1986; 1990; 1996; 1999; 2003; 2007; 2011; 2017; 2025
- Medalists

Ice hockey tournaments have been staged at the Asian Winter Games since 1986. The men's tournament was introduced at the 1986 Asian Winter Games and the women's tournament was introduced at the 1996 Asian Winter Games.

== Summary ==
=== Men ===
Year	Host	Final			Third place match		
Year	Host	Winner	Score	Runner-up	3rd place	Score	4th place
1986	(Japan); Sapporo	China	No playoffs	Japan	South Korea	No playoffs	North Korea
1990	(Japan); Sapporo	China	No playoffs	Japan	South Korea	No playoffs	North Korea
1996	(China); Harbin	Kazakhstan	No playoffs	Japan	China	No playoffs	South Korea
1999	(South Korea); Gangwon	Kazakhstan	No playoffs	Japan	China	No playoffs	South Korea
2003	(Japan); Aomori	Japan	7–2	Kazakhstan	China	6–2	South Korea
2007	(China); Changchun	Japan	No playoffs	Kazakhstan	South Korea	No playoffs	China
2011	(Kazakhstan); Astana–Almaty	Kazakhstan	No playoffs	Japan	South Korea	No playoffs	China
2017	(Japan); Sapporo	Kazakhstan	No playoffs	South Korea	Japan	No playoffs	China
2025	(China); Harbin	Kazakhstan	5–0	Japan	South Korea	5–2	China

=== Women ===
Year	Host	Final			Third place match		
Year	Host	Winner	Score	Runner-up	3rd place	Score	4th place
1996	(China); Harbin	China	No playoffs	Japan	Kazakhstan	No playoffs	None awarded
1999	(South Korea); Gangwon	China	No playoffs	Japan	Kazakhstan	No playoffs	South Korea
2003	(Japan); Aomori	Kazakhstan	No playoffs	Japan	China	No playoffs	North Korea
2007	(China); Changchun	Kazakhstan	No playoffs	Japan	China	No playoffs	North Korea
2011	(Kazakhstan); Astana–Almaty	Kazakhstan	No playoffs	Japan	China	No playoffs	North Korea
2017	(Japan); Sapporo	Japan	No playoffs	China	Kazakhstan	No playoffs	South Korea
2025	(China); Harbin	Japan	No playoffs	Kazakhstan	China	No playoffs	South Korea

== Medal table ==
Rank	Nation	Gold	Silver	Bronze	Total
1	Kazakhstan (KAZ)	8	3	3	14
2	Japan (JPN)	4	11	1	16
3	China (CHN)	4	1	7	12
4	South Korea (KOR)	0	1	5	6
Totals (4 entries)		16	16	16	48

== Participating nations ==
=== Men ===
Team	(Japan) 1986	(Japan) 1990	(China) 1996	(South Korea) 1999	(Japan) 2003	(China) 2007	(Kazakhstan) 2011	(Japan) 2017	(China) 2025	Years
Bahrain							12th		14th	2
China	1st	1st	3rd	3rd	3rd	4th	4th	4th	4th	9
Chinese Taipei							5th	6th	5th	3
Hong Kong						10th		9th	8th	3
India									12th	1
Indonesia								18th		1
Japan	2nd	2nd	2nd	2nd	1st	1st	2nd	3rd	2nd	9
Kazakhstan			1st	1st	2nd	2nd	1st	1st	1st	7
Kuwait				6th		7th	11th	16th	9th	5
Kyrgyzstan							6th	12th	7th	3
Macau						11th		14th	13th	3
Malaysia						8th	10th	15th		3
Mongolia				5th	6th		9th	8th		4
North Korea	4th	4th				5th				3
Philippines								13th		1
Qatar								17th		1
Singapore								10th	11th	2
South Korea	3rd	3rd	4th	4th	4th	3rd	3rd	2nd	3rd	9
Thailand					5th	9th	7th	5th	6th	5
Turkmenistan								11th	10th	2
United Arab Emirates						6th	8th	7th		3
Number of teams	4	4	4	6	6	11	12	18	14	

=== Women ===
Team	(China) 1996	(South Korea) 1999	(Japan) 2003	(China) 2007	(Kazakhstan) 2011	(Japan) 2017	(China) 2025	Years
China	1st	1st	3rd	3rd	3rd	2nd	3rd	7
Chinese Taipei							5th	1
Hong Kong						6th	7th	2
Japan	2nd	2nd	2nd	2nd	2nd	1st	1st	7
Kazakhstan	3rd	3rd	1st	1st	1st	3rd	2nd	7
North Korea			4th	4th	4th			3
South Korea		4th	5th	5th	5th	4th	4th	6
Thailand						5th	6th	2
Number of teams	3	4	5	5	5	6	7	
