= Ice hockey at the 1999 Asian Winter Games – Men's tournament =

International sporting competition

Men at the 1999 Asian Winter Games
- Venue: Gangneung Indoor Ice Rink
- Date: 30 January – 6 February 1999
- Nations: 6

Medalists
gold medal	Kazakhstan
silver medal	Japan
bronze medal	China

The men's tournament of Ice hockey at the 1999 Asian Winter Games at Gangneung, South Korea, was held from 30 January to 6 February 1999.

== Results ==
All times are Korea Standard Time (UTC+09:00)

=== Preliminary round ===
==== Group A ====
Pos	Team	Pld	W	D	L	GF	GA	GD	Pts	Qualification
1	Kazakhstan	2	2	0	0	52	1	+51	4	Final round
2	South Korea	2	1	0	1	15	13	+2	2	Final round
3	Mongolia	2	0	0	2	1	54	−53	0	5th place match

Source: Official website

31 January; 17:00	Mongolia	1–14 (1–6, 0–2, 0–6)	South Korea	Indoor Ice Rink, Gangneung

2 February; 17:00	Kazakhstan	12–1 (5–0, 3–0, 4–1)	South Korea	Indoor Ice Rink, Gangneung

3 February; 17:00	Mongolia	0–40 (0–7, 0–12, 0–21)	Kazakhstan	Indoor Ice Rink, Gangneung

==== Group B ====
Pos	Team	Pld	W	D	L	GF	GA	GD	Pts	Qualification
1	Japan	2	2	0	0	51	1	+50	4	Final round
2	China	2	1	0	1	35	7	+28	2	Final round
3	Kuwait	2	0	0	2	1	79	−78	0	5th place match

Source: Official website

30 January; 18:00	Japan	44–1 (15–0, 11–1, 18–0)	Kuwait	Indoor Ice Rink, Gangneung

1 February; 14:00	Kuwait	0–35 (0–15, 0–15, 0–5)	China	Indoor Ice Rink, Gangneung

3 February; 14:00	China	0–7 (0–1, 0–2, 0–4)	Japan	Indoor Ice Rink, Gangneung

=== 5th place match ===
5 February; 11:00	Mongolia	5–4 OT (0–3, 4–0, 0–1) (OT: 1–0)	Kuwait	Indoor Ice Rink, Gangneung

=== Final round ===
- The results and the points of the matches between the same teams that were already played during the preliminary round shall be taken into account for the final round.

Pos	Team	Pld	W	D	L	GF	GA	GD	Pts
1	Kazakhstan	3	2	1	0	25	4	+21	5 (Note: Head-to-head result: KAZ 1–1 JPN. Overall goal difference was used as the tiebreaker.)
2	Japan	3	2	1	0	21	2	+19	5
3	China	3	1	0	2	9	21	−12	2
4	South Korea	3	0	0	3	4	32	−28	0

Source: Official website
Notes:

5 February; 14:00	China	2–12 (0–5, 2–5, 0–2)	Kazakhstan	Indoor Ice Rink, Gangneung

5 February; 17:00	South Korea	1–13 (0–5, 0–2, 1–6)	Japan	Indoor Ice Rink, Gangneung

6 February; 12:00	China	7–2 (3–0, 4–1, 0–1)	South Korea	Indoor Ice Rink, Gangneung

6 February; 15:00	Japan	1–1 (0–0, 0–0, 1–1)	Kazakhstan	Indoor Ice Rink, Gangneung

== Final standing ==
Rank	Team	Pld	W	D	L
1st place, gold medalist(s)	Kazakhstan	4	3	1	0
2nd place, silver medalist(s)	Japan	4	3	1	0
3rd place, bronze medalist(s)	China	4	2	0	2
4	South Korea	4	1	0	3
5	Mongolia	3	1	0	2
6	Kuwait	3	0	0	3
