= Ice hockey at the 1996 Asian Winter Games – Men's tournament =

Men at the 1996 Asian Winter Games
- Venue: Baqu Arena
- Date: 5–8 February 1996
- Nations: 4

Medalists
gold medal	Kazakhstan
silver medal	Japan
bronze medal	China

The men's tournament of Ice hockey at the 1996 Asian Winter Games at Baqu Arena in Harbin, China, was held from 5 to 8 February 1996.

Kazakhstan won the gold medal in a round robin competition.

== Results ==
Pos	Team	Pld	W	D	L	GF	GA	GD	Pts
1	Kazakhstan	3	3	0	0	33	2	+31	6
2	Japan	3	2	0	1	14	6	+8	4
3	China	3	1	0	2	7	29	−22	2
4	South Korea	3	0	0	3	4	21	−17	0

Source: Results

5 February	Kazakhstan	4–1 (1–0, 2–1, 1–0)	Japan	Baqu Arena, Harbin

5 February	China	6–2 (2–2, 1–0, 3–0)	South Korea	Baqu Arena, Harbin

6 February	Japan	6–1 (1–0, 3–0, 2–1)	South Korea	Baqu Arena, Harbin

6 February	China	0–20 (0–8, 0–8, 0–4)	Kazakhstan	Baqu Arena, Harbin

8 February	South Korea	1–9 (0–3, 0–3, 1–3)	Kazakhstan	Baqu Arena, Harbin

8 February	China	1–7 (0–1, 0–1, 1–5)	Japan	Baqu Arena, Harbin

== Final standing ==
Rank	Team	Pld	W	D	L
1st place, gold medalist(s)	Kazakhstan	3	3	0	0
2nd place, silver medalist(s)	Japan	3	2	0	1
3rd place, bronze medalist(s)	China	3	1	0	2
4	South Korea	3	0	0	3
