= Ice hockey at the 1990 Asian Winter Games =

Asian Winter Games competition

- Venue: Tsukisamu Gymnasium
- Dates: 10–13 March 1990
- Nations: 4

Ice hockey at the 1990 Asian Winter Games took place in the city of Sapporo, Japan. Just like in the inaugural edition of the Winter Asian Games, only four nations competed in the sport: China, Japan, South Korea and North Korea.

The competition was held at the Tsukisamu Gymnasium from 10 to 13 March.

== Schedule ==
●	Round	●	Last round

Event↓/Date →	10th Sat	11th Sun	12th Mon	13th Tue
Men	●	●		●

== Medalists ==
Event	Gold	Silver	Bronze
Men	China; Zhang Yan; Wang Yongjun; Gao Chunlin; Sun Dehong; Zhang Zhenhua; Guan Xiaofang; Wang Benyu; Zhang Zhinan; Tian Yujie; Jin Xianxiu; Li Hongjun; Sui Xiaolei; Sun Xiaodong; Zhao Danshi; Wang Anfu; Ren Dong; Wang Hui; Liu Wenwu; Ji Weiguang; Wei Lingyun	Japan; Atsuo Kudo; Fumihiko Kajikawa; Tetsunobu Kadohashi; Hirotoshi Osawa; Toshiyuki Yajima; Yasuhiro Honma; Toshiyuki Sakai; Hidekatsu Takagi; Shuji Momoi; Akihito Sugisawa; Yuji Iwamoto; Hikomi Senuma; Sayaka Ishii; Koshi Kiyoe; Noriwaka Kadohashi; Yuji Iga; Homare Narita; Hiroshi Hikigi; Kenji Nobuta; Katsunori Hirano; Takayuki Miura; Tadashi Haga	South Korea; Yoon Sung-yup; Shin Seung-ho; Lee Ki-hoon; Song Ki-yong; Park Sung-joo; Han Jung-hyun; Lee Jae-hyuk; Kim Jae-hak; Shim Eui-sik; Lee Kang-su; Seo Tae-seok; Byun Sun-jin; Park Hyun-wook; Choi Min-seok; Lee Dong-ho; Pyo Young-woon; Oh Jae-won; Shin Hyun-dae; Lee Dong-ho; No Jung-won; Hong Jong-sung; Kim Kwan-sung

== Results ==
Pos	Team	Pld	W	D	L	GF	GA	GD	Pts
1	China	3	2	1	0	17	10	+7	5
2	Japan	3	2	0	1	19	13	+6	4
3	South Korea	3	1	0	2	15	23	−8	2
4	North Korea	3	0	1	2	13	18	−5	1

Source: Results

10 March	South Korea	2–7 (1–4, 0–3, 1–0)	China	Tsukisamu Gymnasium, Sapporo

10 March	North Korea	2–6 (0–4, 1–2, 1–0)	Japan	Tsukisamu Gymnasium, Sapporo

11 March	China	6–6 (3–2, 1–3, 2–1)	North Korea	Tsukisamu Gymnasium, Sapporo

11 March	Japan	11–7 (8–1, 1–2, 2–4)	South Korea	Tsukisamu Gymnasium, Sapporo

13 March	South Korea	6–5 (3–1, 1–1, 2–3)	North Korea	Tsukisamu Gymnasium, Sapporo

13 March	China	4–2 (0–0, 2–2, 2–0)	Japan	Tsukisamu Gymnasium, Sapporo

== Final standing ==
Rank	Team	Pld	W	D	L
1st place, gold medalist(s)	China	3	2	1	0
2nd place, silver medalist(s)	Japan	3	2	0	1
3rd place, bronze medalist(s)	South Korea	3	1	0	2
4	North Korea	3	0	1	2
