= Japan national ice hockey team =

The Japanese national ice hockey team may refer to:

- Japan men's national ice hockey team
- Japan men's national junior ice hockey team
- Japan men's national under-18 ice hockey team
- Japan women's national ice hockey team
- Japan women's national under-18 ice hockey team
