= Yoshifumi Fujisawa =

Japanese ice hockey coach

- Born: February 12, 1976 (age 49)
- Height: 5 ft 9 in (175 cm)
- Weight: 168 lb (76 kg; 12 st 0 lb)
- Position: Forward
- Shot: Left
- Played for: Furukawa Ice Hockey Club; Colorado Gold Kings; Nikkō Ice Bucks
- National team: Japan
- Playing career: 1995–2004

Yoshifumi Fujisawa (born February 12, 1976) is a Japanese ice hockey coach. He coached the Japanese national team at the 2015 IIHF Women's World Championship.
