= Hockey at the Asian Games =

Hockey at the Asian Games may refer to

- Field hockey at the Asian Games
- Ice hockey at the Asian Winter Games
