= Japan women's national hockey team =

Japan women's national hockey team may refer to:

- Japan women's national field hockey team
- Japan women's national ice hockey team
