= 2026 IIHF Asia Championship =

Tournament details
- Host country: China
- City: Beijing
- Venue: 1 (in 1 host city)
- Dates: 20–23 November 2025
- Teams: 4

Final positions
- Champions: Kazakhstan (2nd title)
- Runners-up: South Korea
- Third place: Japan
- Fourth place: China

Tournament statistics
- Games played: 6
- Goals scored: 28 (4.67 per game)
- Attendance: 3,890 (648 per game)
- Scoring leader: (Kazakhstan) Maxim Musorov (7 points)

Official website
- www.iihf.com

The 2026 IIHF Asia Championship was the second edition of the IIHF Asia Championship Series, organised by the International Ice Hockey Federation (IIHF). It was held in Beijing, China from 20 to 23 November 2025.

Kazakhstan won the tournament for the second time.

== Standings ==
Pos	Team	Pld	W	OTW	OTL	L	GF	GA	GD	Pts
1st place, gold medalist(s)	Kazakhstan	3	3	0	0	0	13	6	+7	9
2nd place, silver medalist(s)	South Korea	3	2	0	0	1	6	4	+2	6
3rd place, bronze medalist(s)	Japan	3	1	0	0	2	7	6	+1	3
4	China (H)	3	0	0	0	3	2	12	−10	0

Source: IIHF
Rules for classification: 1) points; 2) head-to-head points; 3) head-to-head goal difference; 4) head-to-head number of goals scored; 5) result against closest best-ranked team outside tied teams; 6) result against second-best ranked team outside tied teams; 7) seeding before tournament.
(H) Host

== Results ==
All times are local (UTC+8).

20 November 2025; 16:00	South Korea	2–4 (0–1, 1–1, 1–2)	Kazakhstan	Ice Sports Training Base, Beijing; Attendance: 763

Game reference

Lee Yeon-seung
Goalies
Roman Kalmykov
Referees:
(Japan) Kenji Kosaka
(China) Lu Haotian
Linesmen:
(China) Chi Hongda
(China) Yuan Zhaoyang

	0–1	10:10 – Stepanenko (Musorov, Mikhailov)
	0–2	22:40 – Stepanenko (Borissevich, Musorov)
Kim Sa. (Nam, Lee Yu.) (PP) – 32:47	1–2
	1–3	42:47 – Starchenko (Musorov, Likhotnikov) (PP)
	1–4	47:56 – Stepanenko (Lyapunov, Borissevich)
Kang (Kim G., Kim Se.) (PP) – 58:02	2–4

9 min
Penalties
4 min
27
Shots
22

20 November 2025; 19:30	Japan	4–1 (0–1, 2–0, 2–0)	China	Ice Sports Training Base, Beijing; Attendance: 876

Game reference

Issa Otsuka
Goalies
Chen Shifeng
Referees:
(South Korea) Chae Young-jin
(Kazakhstan) Mihail Stupak
Linesmen:
(South Korea) Lim Jun-seo
(Kazakhstan) Vladislav Mashenkin

	0–1	14:48 – Yan (Jiang) (PP)
Toko (Ushio, Sasaki) – 28:11	1–1
Ushio (Y. Sato, Yoneyama) (PP) – 33:22	2–1
Nakajima (Y. Sato, Hanzawa) – 40:14	3–1
Nakajima (Miura, Y. Sato) – 47:45	4–1

10 min
Penalties
10 min
43
Shots
21

22 November 2025; 16:00	Japan	0–1 (0–0, 0–1, 0–0)	South Korea	Ice Sports Training Base, Beijing; Attendance: 368

Game reference
Eiki Sato	Goalies	Lee Yeon-seung	Referees: (China) Feng Lei (China) Lu Haotian; Linesmen: (Kazakhstan) Vladislav Mashenkin (China) Yuan Zhaoyang
0–1 / 31:44 – Kim Sa. (Kim Si., Nam)			Referees: (China) Feng Lei (China) Lu Haotian; Linesmen: (Kazakhstan) Vladislav Mashenkin (China) Yuan Zhaoyang
6 min	Penalties	6 min	Referees: (China) Feng Lei (China) Lu Haotian; Linesmen: (Kazakhstan) Vladislav Mashenkin (China) Yuan Zhaoyang
38	Shots	32	Referees: (China) Feng Lei (China) Lu Haotian; Linesmen: (Kazakhstan) Vladislav Mashenkin (China) Yuan Zhaoyang

22 November 2025; 19:30	Kazakhstan	5–1 (1–0, 3–1, 1–0)	China	Ice Sports Training Base, Beijing; Attendance: 759

Game reference

Vladislav Pestov
Goalies
Chen Shifeng
Referees:
(South Korea) Chae Young-jin
(Japan) Kenji Kosaka
Linesmen:
(South Korea) Lim Jun-seo
(Japan) Ryoya Yamada

Musorov (Lyapunov, Borissevich) – 03:04	1–0
Alexandrov (Likhotnikov, Chaporov) – 26:23	2–0
Muratov (Starchenko, Boiko) – 27:52	3–0
Gatiyatov (Butenko, Daniyar) – 31:50	4–0
	4–1	36:46 – Zheng M. (Wang, Hou)
Muratov (Starchenko, Nikitin) – 55:51	5–1

8 min
Penalties
2 min
44
Shots
22

23 November 2025; 16:00	Kazakhstan	4–3 (1–1, 3–1, 0–1)	Japan	Ice Sports Training Base, Beijing; Attendance: 385

Game reference

Roman Kalmykov
Goalies
Issa Otsuka
Referees:
(South Korea) Chae Young-jin
(China) Feng Lei
Linesmen:
(China) Chi Hongda
(South Korea) Lim Jun-seo

Lyapunov (Starchenko, Musorov) (PP) – 05:47	1–0
	1–1	18:22 – M. Suzuki (Ushio)
Starchenko (Mikhailov, Musorov) (PP) – 21:37	2–1
	2–2	24:52 – Y. Sato (Yoneyama, Nakajima) (PP)
Borissevich (Lyapunov, Musorov) – 25:10	3–2
Starchenko (Boiko, Muratov) – 29:28	4–2
	4–3	55:21 – Okubo (Nakajima, Y. Sato)

6 min
Penalties
14 min
37
Shots
25

23 November 2025; 19:30	China	0–3 (0–3, 0–0, 0–0)	South Korea	Ice Sports Training Base, Beijing; Attendance: 739

Game reference

Chen Shifeng
Goalies
Jang Ga-ram
Referees:
(Japan) Kenji Kosaka
(Kazakhstan) Mihail Stupak
Linesmen:
(Kazakhstan) Vladislav Mashenkin
(Japan) Ryoya Yamada

0–1	07:36 – Kim Sa. (Kwon)
0–2	08:30 – Shin D. (Song, Nam)
0–3	14:38 – Kim Sa. (Kwon, Kim Se.)

29 min
Penalties
10 min
25
Shots
37
