= Ice hockey at the 2003 Asian Winter Games – Women's tournament =

Women's ice hockey tournament

Women at the 2003 Asian Winter Games
- Venue: Misawa Ice Arena
- Date: 30 January – 5 February 2003
- Nations: 5

Medalists
gold medal	Kazakhstan
silver medal	Japan
bronze medal	China

The women's tournament of Ice hockey at the 2003 Asian Winter Games at Misawa, Japan, was held from 30 January to 5 February 2003.

== Results ==
All times are Japan Standard Time (UTC+09:00)

Pos	Team	Pld	W	D	L	GF	GA	GD	Pts
1	Kazakhstan	4	3	1	0	26	4	+22	7
2	Japan	4	3	0	1	33	8	+25	6
3	China	4	2	1	1	43	8	+35	5
4	North Korea	4	1	0	3	14	17	−3	2
5	South Korea	4	0	0	4	1	80	−79	0

Source: Official website

30 January; 13:00	North Korea	2–3 (1–1, 0–1, 1–1)	Kazakhstan	Misawa Ice Arena, Misawa

30 January; 17:00	South Korea	0–21 (0–6, 0–9, 0–6)	Japan	Misawa Ice Arena, Misawa

31 January; 13:00	China	30–1 (9–0, 8–0, 13–1)	South Korea	Misawa Ice Arena, Misawa

31 January; 17:00	Japan	6–1 (1–0, 3–1, 2–0)	North Korea	Misawa Ice Arena, Misawa

2 February; 13:00	China	8–1 (3–0, 4–1, 1–0)	North Korea	Misawa Ice Arena, Misawa

2 February; 17:00	Japan	1–3 (0–0, 1–0, 0–3)	Kazakhstan	Misawa Ice Arena, Misawa

3 February; 13:00	Kazakhstan	1–1 (0–1, 0–0, 1–0)	China	Misawa Ice Arena, Misawa

3 February; 17:00	South Korea	0–10 (0–6, 0–3, 0–1)	North Korea	Misawa Ice Arena, Misawa

5 February; 10:30	Kazakhstan	19–0 (14–0, 5–0)	South Korea	Misawa Ice Arena, Misawa

- The game between was called after 23:46 minutes after South Korean players refused to continue the game.

5 February; 14:00	China	4–5 (0–2, 0–0, 4–3)	Japan	Misawa Ice Arena, Misawa

== Final standing ==
Rank	Team	Pld	W	D	L
1st place, gold medalist(s)	Kazakhstan	4	3	1	0
2nd place, silver medalist(s)	Japan	4	3	0	1
3rd place, bronze medalist(s)	China	4	2	1	1
4	North Korea	4	1	0	3
5	South Korea	4	0	0	4
