= 2025 IIHF Asia Championship =

Tournament details
- Host country: Kazakhstan
- City: Almaty
- Venue: 1 (in 1 host city)
- Dates: 6–9 November 2024
- Teams: 4

Final positions
- Champions: Kazakhstan (1st title)
- Runners-up: Japan
- Third place: South Korea
- Fourth place: China

Tournament statistics
- Games played: 6
- Goals scored: 33 (5.5 per game)
- Attendance: 10,715 (1,786 per game)
- Scoring leader: (Japan) Taiga Irikura (5 points)

Official website
- www.iihf.com

The 2025 IIHF Asia Championship was an international men's ice hockey tournament organized by the International Ice Hockey Federation (IIHF) as part of the IIHF Asia Championship Series. It was the first edition of this event. The tournament was played at Halyk Arena in Almaty, Kazakhstan, from 6 to 9 November 2024. Kazakhstan won the tournament after winning the group.

All four teams fielded notably young rosters. Kazakhstan selected a squad composed largely of second-tier players from the VHL and the Pro Hokei Ligasy, while both Japan and South Korea introduced several new faces. China continued its recent policy of relying exclusively on domestic talent, with no naturalized players included.

Most teams had an average age under 25, with the exception of Kazakhstan, whose roster averaged 26.55 years. China featured the youngest team, with an average age of 24.09.

The youthful lineups contributed to a competitive tournament. South Korea managed to defeat Kazakhstan in the opening game 4-1 but failed to capitalize on the upset. On the other hand, China defeated South Korea for the first time in 18 years. The tournament drew an average attendance of 1,786 per game, in a venue with an approximate capacity of 3,000.

== Creation ==
The tournament was first proposed in May 2023 after collaboration was agreed between China, Japan, Kazakhstan and South Korea with the IIHF to grow Asian Ice Hockey. The four nations have agreed to play this tournament for four years.

== Venue ==
The venue was the Halyk Arena in Almaty, Kazakhstan.

2025 IIHF Asia Championship is located in Kazakhstan	Almaty
2025 IIHF Asia Championship is located in Kazakhstan	Halyk Arena
2025 IIHF Asia Championship is located in Kazakhstan	Capacity: 12,000

== Final standings ==
Pos	Team	Pld	W	OTW	OTL	L	GF	GA	GD	Pts
1	Kazakhstan (H)	3	2	0	0	1	12	6	+6	6 (Note: Kazakhstan 5–1 Japan)
2	Japan	3	2	0	0	1	10	8	+2	6
3	South Korea	3	1	0	1	1	7	8	−1	4
4	China	3	0	1	0	2	4	11	−7	2

Source: IIHF
(H) Host

== Match results ==
All times are local (Time in Kazakhstan – UTC+5).

6 November 2024; 16:00	Japan	4–1 (2–1, 1–0, 1–0)	China	Halyk Arena, Almaty; Attendance: 293

Eiki Sato
Goalies
Chen Shifeng
Referees:
(South Korea) Chae Young-kin
(Kazakhstan) Konstantin Chubenko
Linesmen:
(Kazakhstan) Timur Iskakov
(Kazakhstan) Vladislav Zotov

Ushio (Takebe, Ishida) (PP) – 14:22	1–0
	1–1	07:19 – Han (Yan, Wang J.)
Tokoro (Kamada) – 14:57	2–1
Hanzawa (Kobayashi, Yoneyama) (PP) – 29:40	3–1
Isogai (Kobayashi, Yoneyama) (PP) – 57:28	4–1

12 min
Penalties
12 min
38
Shots
15

6 November 2024; 19:30	South Korea	4–1 (0–0, 2–1, 2–0)	Kazakhstan	Halyk Arena, Almaty; Attendance: 2,921

Lee Yeon-seung
Goalies
Jelal-ad-Din Amirbekov
Referees:
(Japan) Goro Terakado
(Sweden) Johan Wedin
Linesmen:
(China) Chi Hongda
(South Korea) Choi Do-yeon

Oh (Lee S., Lee H.) – 20:56	1–0
	1–1	23:51 – Borissevich (Presnov)
Jeong – 34:46	2–1
Kim G. (Kim Sa., Kang Y.) (EN) – 58:03	3–1
Kim Sa. (Kim G., Kang Y.) – 59:18	4–1

6 min
Penalties
2 min
20
Shots
28

8 November 2024; 16:00	Japan	5–2 (2–0, 2–2, 1–0)	South Korea	Halyk Arena, Almaty; Attendance: 715

Takayuki Ito
Goalies
Lee Yeon-seung
Referees:
(Kazakhstan) Konstantin Chubenko
(China) Liu Jiaqi
Linesmen:
(Kazakhstan) Nurian Alpyspayev
(Kazakhstan) Vladislav Mashenkin

Takebe (Ando, Ishida) (PP) – 12:45	1–0
Irikura (Hanzawa, Yoneyama) (PP) – 15:33	2–0
Irikura (Hanzawa, Ishida) – 23:11	3–0
	3–1	23:46 – Lee S. (Lee H.)
	3–2	27:35 – Kang M. (Nam, Kang Y.) (PP)
Irikura (Isogai, Kobayashi) (PP) – 29:48	4–2
Isogai (Hanzawa, Irikura) – 43:42	5–2

8 min
Penalties
8 min
33
Shots
30

8 November 2024; 19:30	Kazakhstan	6–1 (1–0, 1–1, 4–0)	China	Halyk Arena, Almaty; Attendance: 2,283

Amirbekov
Goalies
Sun Zehao
Referees:
(South Korea) Chae Young-jin
(Japan) Goro Terakado
Linesmen:
(Kazakhstan) Damir Dairov
(Japan) Ryohma Taniguchi

Breus (Grents, Rymarev) (PP) – 16:34	1–0
	1–1	26:52 – Zheng (Hou, Zhang P.)
Buyalski (Korolinskiy) – 30:32	2–1
Grents (Rymarev) – 44:13	3–1
Korolinskiy (Breus, Zubov) – 44:53	4–1
Breus (Buyalskiy) (PP) – 50:26	5–1
Breus (Grents, Rymarev) – 56:52	6–1

8 min
Penalties
8 min
47
Shots
21

9 November 2024; 16:00	China	2–1 OT (1–1, 0–0, 0–0) (OT: 1–0)	South Korea	Halyk Arena, Almaty; Attendance: 1,408

Chen Shifeng
Goalies
Ha Jung-ho
Referees:
(South Korea) Chae Young-jin
(China) Liu Jiaqi
Linesmen:
(Kazakhstan) Timur Iskakov
(Kazakhstan) Vladislav Mashenkin

Hou (Wang J., Yan) (PP) – 02:43	1–0
	1–1	07:40 – Kim Sa. (Kwon, Nam)
Zhang Z. (Zhang J., Zhang P.) (PP) – 61:45	2–1

2 min
Penalties
4 min
24
Shots
38

9 November 2024; 19:30	Kazakhstan	5–1 (1–0, 2–0, 2–1)	Japan	Halyk Arena, Almaty; Attendance: 3,095

Jelal-ad-Din Amirbekov
Goalies
Issa Otsuka
Referees:
(Kazakhstan) Konstantin Chubenko
(Sweden) Johan Wedin
Linesmen:
(China) Chi Hongda
(South Korea) Choi Do-yeon

Rymarev (Borissevich, Grents) – 07:16	1–0
Rymarev (Alexandrov) – 27:47	2–0
Namestnikov (Korolinskiy) – 29:11	3–0
	3–1	42:51 – Irikura (Hanzawa, Kobayashi) (PP)
Grebenshikov (Volkov, Korolinskiy) – 44:58	4–1
Korolinskiy (EN) – 58:26	5–1

6 min
Penalties
6 min
23
Shots
24
