= Tomoe Yamane =

Japanese ice hockey player

- Born: March 24, 1986 (age 39); Mihara, Japan
- Height: 5 ft 6 in (168 cm)
- Weight: 154 lb (70 kg; 11 st 0 lb)
- Position: Defence
- Shoots: Right
- National team: Japan

Tomoe Yamane (山根 朋恵, Yamane Tomoe, born March 24, 1986 in Mihara) is a Japanese ice hockey defender.

== International career ==
Yamane was selected for the Japan women's national ice hockey team in the 2014 Winter Olympics. She played in all five games, scoring one goal.

Yamane also played for Japan in the qualifying events for the 2014, 2010 and 2006 Winter Olympics.

As of 2015, Yamane has also appeared for Japan at six IIHF Women's World Championships, with the first in 2001.

== Career statistics ==
=== International career ===
Through 2014–15 season

Year	Team	Event	GP	G	A	Pts	PIM
2004	Japan	Oly Q	2	0	1	1	0
2004	Japan	WW	4	0	0	0	2
2005	Japan	WW DI	5	0	0	0	4
2007	Japan	WW DI	5	1	2	3	10
2008	Japan	WW	4	0	1	1	2
2008	Japan	OlyQ	3	0	0	0	0
2009	Japan	WW	4	0	0	0	4
2013	Japan	OlyQ	3	0	1	1	4
2013	Japan	WW DIA	5	0	0	0	2
2014	Japan	Oly	5	1	0	1	8
