= Sergei Nevstruyev =

Kazakh ice hockey player

- Born: August 29, 1972; Ust-Kamenogorsk, Kazakh SSR, Soviet Union
- Height: 6 ft 1 in (185 cm)
- Weight: 194 lb (88 kg; 13 st 12 lb)
- Position: Defenceman
- Shot: L
- Played for: Neman Grodno; Torpedo Ust-Kamenogorsk; Barys Astana; Gornyak Rudny
- National team: Kazakhstan
- Playing career: 1992–2010

Sergei Nevstruyev
Medal record

Men's ice hockey

Representing Kazakhstan

Asian Games
Gold medal – first place	1999 Gangwon	Ice hockey
Silver medal – second place	2003 Aomori	Ice hockey

Sergei Viktorovich Nevstruyev (Russian: Серге́й Викторович Невструев, born August 29, 1972) is a former Kazakh professional ice hockey player and currently an ice hockey coach.

Sporting positions
Preceded by Oleg Kovalenko	Barys Astana captain 2006–07	Succeeded by Ildar Yubin
