= Dinara Dikambayeva =

Kazakhstani ice hockey player

- Born: 11 May 1982 (age 44) Alma-Ata, Kazakh SSR, Soviet Union
- Height: 157 cm (5 ft 2 in)
- Weight: 49 kg (108 lb; 7 st 10 lb)
- Position: Forward
- Shot: Right
- National team: Kazakhstan
- Playing career: 1999–2003
Medal record
Representing Kazakhstan
Women's ice hockey
Asian Games
Gold medal – first place	2003 Aomori	Ice hockey
Bronze medal – third place	1999 Gangwon	Ice hockey

Dinara Batyrkhanovna Dikambayeva (Kazakh: Динара Батырханқызы Дикамбаева (Dinara Batyrhanqyzy Dikambaeva), Russian: Динара Батырхановна Дикамбаева; born 11 May 1982) is a Kazakhstani ice hockey player. She competed in the women's tournament at the 2002 Winter Olympics.
