= Wang Ying (ice hockey) =

Chinese ice hockey player

Wang Ying 王瑛
- Born: 8 October 1981 (age 45) Heilongjiang, China
- Height: 161 cm (5 ft 3 in)
- Weight: 62 kg (137 lb; 9 st 11 lb)
- Position: Defense
- Shot: Left
- Played for: Harbin Ice Hockey
- National team: China
- Playing career: c. 1999–c. 2005
Medal record
Women's ice hockey
Asian Winter Games
Bronze medal – third place	2003 Aomori

Wang Ying (Chinese: 王瑛; born 8 October 1981) is a Chinese retired ice hockey player. She was a member of the Chinese women's national ice hockey team and represented China in the women's ice hockey tournament at the 2002 Winter Olympics and at the 2003 Asian Winter Games, where China won bronze.
