= Ai Tada =

Japanese ice hockey player (born 2006)

- Born: April 4, 2006 (age 20) Tokyo, Japan
- Height: 1.58 m (5 ft 2 in)
- Weight: 60 kg (132 lb; 9 st 6 lb)
- Position: Forward
- Shoots: Left
- National team: Japan

Ai Tada (born April 4, 2006) is a Japanese ice hockey player. She is a member of the Japanese women's national ice hockey team, she participated in women's ice hockey tournament at the 2026 Winter Olympics.

== Playing career ==
=== International play ===
Making her Olympic debut on February 6, Japan opposed France. Wearing number 17, Tada logged 3:05 of ice time.

She was one of 17 teenagers that played in women's ice hockey at the 2026 Winter Olympics.
