= Naho Yoshimi =

Japanese ice hockey player

Personal information
- Nationality: Japanese
- Born: 31 January 1972 (age 53); Tokyo, Japan

Sport
- Sport: Ice hockey

Naho Yoshimi (吉見 菜保, Yoshimi Naho, born 31 January 1972) is a Japanese ice hockey player. She competed in the women's tournament at the 1998 Winter Olympics.
