= Ayumi Sato =

Japanese ice hockey player

Personal information
- Nationality: Japanese
- Born: 16 July 1977 (age 49) Morioka, Japan

Sport
- Sport: Ice hockey

Ayumi Sato (佐藤 あゆみ, Satō Ayumi; born 16 July 1977) is a Japanese ice hockey player. She competed in the women's tournament at the 1998 Winter Olympics.
