= Maiko Obikawa =

Japanese ice hockey player

Personal information
- Nationality: Japanese
- Born: 13 March 1973 (age 52); Hokkaido, Japan

Sport
- Sport: Ice hockey

Maiko Obikawa (帯川 牧子, Obikawa Maiko, born 13 March 1973) is a Japanese ice hockey player. She competed in the women's tournament at the 1998 Winter Olympics.
