= Roman Kozlov =

Kazakhstani ice hockey player

- Born: September 30, 1981 (age 43); Ust-Kamenogorsk, KAZ
- Height: 6 ft 1 in (185 cm)
- Weight: 183 lb (83 kg; 13 st 1 lb)
- Position: Centre
- Shot: Left
- Played for: Zauralie Kurgan; Kazzinc-Torpedo; Neftekhimik Nizhnekamsk; Neftyanik Almetyevsk; Barys Astana; Gazovik Tyumen; Sputnik Nizhny Tagil
- National team: Kazakhstan
- Playing career: 2001–2016

Roman Aleksandrovich Kozlov (Russian: Роман Александрович Козлов; born 30 September 1981) is a Kazakhstani former ice hockey forward. He spent most of his career in the Russian lower leagues, and also played for the Kazakhstan national team at five World Championships.
