= Aki Sudo =

Japanese ice hockey player

Personal information
- Nationality: Japanese
- Born: 20 January 1975 (age 51) Hokkaido, Japan

Sport
- Sport: Ice hockey

Aki Sudo (須藤 亜貴, Sudō Aki; born 20 January 1975) is a Japanese ice hockey player. She competed in the women's tournament at the 1998 Winter Olympics.

Sudo began to play ice hockey as a child, when she fit into her older brother's skates and gear. She began playing on a city women's team at age 13, and on the Japanese national team at age 16. She worked as an engineer at Xerox in Kushiro when she was not playing hockey. In 1998 she was a member of the Japanese women's ice hockey team at the 1998 Winter Olympics in Nagano.
