= Akiko Hatanaka =

Japanese ice hockey player

Personal information
- Nationality: Japanese
- Born: 23 April 1975 (age 51) Sakai, Japan

Sport
- Sport: Ice hockey

Akiko Hatanaka (畠中 亜希子, Hatanaka Akiko; born 23 April 1975) is a Japanese ice hockey player. She competed in the women's tournament at the 1998 Winter Olympics.
