= Yekaterina Maltseva =

Kazakhstani ice hockey player

Personal information
- Nationality: Kazakhstani
- Born: 31 March 1985 (age 40) Alma-Ata, Kazakh SSR, Soviet Union

Sport
- Sport: Ice hockey

Yekaterina Maltseva (Екатерина Александровна Мальцева, born 31 March 1985) is a Kazakhstani ice hockey player. She competed in the women's tournament at the 2002 Winter Olympics.
