= Mitsuko Igarashi =

Japanese ice hockey player

Personal information
- Nationality: Japanese
- Born: 21 August 1977 (age 47); Hokkaido, Japan

Sport
- Sport: Ice hockey

Mitsuko Igarashi (五十嵐 充子, Igarashi Mitsuko; born 21 August 1977) is a Japanese ice hockey player.

== Career ==
She competed in the women's tournament at the 1998 Winter Olympics.
