= Wang Wei (ice hockey) =

Chinese ice hockey player

- Born: 15 February 1977 (age 48)
- Height: 165 cm (5 ft 5 in)
- Weight: 72 kg (159 lb; 11 st 5 lb)
- Position: Defense
- Shot: Left
- National team: China
- Playing career: 1996–2001

Wang Wei (Chinese: 王微, born 15 February 1977), is a Chinese retired ice hockey defender who played for the national team at the 1998 Winter Olympics where China finished fourth, 1999 Asian Winter Games, where China won the gold medal.

== Career statistics ==
Note: GP = Games played; G = Goals; A = Assists; Pts = Points; PIM = Penalty minutes;

				Regular season
Year	Team	Event	Result	GP	G	A	Pts	PIM
1997	China	WC	4th	5	1	1	2	0
1998	China	OG	4th	6	0	2	2	2
1999	China	WC	5th	5	1	2	3	2
2000	China	WC	6th	5	0	4	4	16
2001	China	WC	6th	5	0	1	1	4
