= Yuliya Solovyova =

Kazakhstani ice hockey player

Personal information
- Nationality: Kazakhstani
- Born: 4 January 1967 (age 59) Alma-Ata, Kazakh SSR, Soviet Union

Sport
- Sport: Ice hockey

Yuliya Solovyova (Юлия Валерьевна Соловьева, born 4 January 1967) is a Kazakhstani ice hockey player. She competed in the women's tournament at the 2002 Winter Olympics.
