= China men's national ice hockey team =

Men's ice hockey team in China

China
- Nickname: 龙 (Dragons)
- Association: Chinese Ice Hockey Association
- General manager: Tian Tengjun
- Head coach: Perry Pearn
- Assistants: Eugene Reilly; Zheng Enlai; Yudi Zhou
- Captain: Zhang Zesen
- Most games: Wang Dahai (87)
- Top scorer: Zhang Zesen (24)
- Most points: Zhang Zesen (50)
- Team colors
- IIHF code: CHN
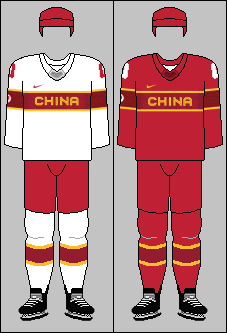

Ranking
- Current IIHF: 26 (3 June 2026)
- Highest IIHF: 25 (2025)
- Lowest IIHF: 39 (2011)

First international
- Romania 4–2 China (Warsaw, Poland; 12 March 1956)

Biggest win
- China 35–0 Kuwait (Gangneung, South Korea; 1 February 1999)

Biggest defeat
- Norway 25–1 China (Debrecen, Hungary; 22 April 2005)

Olympics
- Appearances: 1 (first in 2022)

IIHF World Championships
- Appearances: 47 (first in 1972)
- Best result: 15th (1982)

Asian Winter Games
- Appearances: 8 (first in 1986)
- Best result: Gold (1986, 1990); Bronze (1996, 1999, 2003)

International record (W–L–T)
- 150–232–25

China men's national ice hockey team
- Traditional Chinese: 中國國家冰球隊
- Simplified Chinese: 中国国家冰球队
Transcriptions
Standard Mandarin
- Hanyu Pinyin: Zhōngguó Guójiā Bīngqiú Duì

The Chinese national ice hockey team is the national men's ice hockey team of the People's Republic of China. The team is controlled by the Chinese Ice Hockey Association and is a member of the International Ice Hockey Federation (IIHF). As of 2025, China is ranked 25th in the IIHF World Ranking and 4th in the AIH Asian Ranking.

== History ==
China made its World Championship debut in 1972 in Pool C. The team experienced its golden era during the 1980s, achieving its best-ever result at the world championship by finishing 15th in 1982.

Team China began to decline in the early 1990s, struggling with an aging core, lack of replacements, and decreasing government support as the country shifted toward a market-based sports system. China soon dropped to Division IIB (the fifth tier) and spent years ranked between 35th and 40th in the world.

At the 2022 Winter Olympics in Beijing, China participated in the men's ice hockey tournament as the host nation, earning an automatic berth despite being ranked just 38th in the IIHF World Ranking at the time of the hosting rights award. In preparation for the Olympic tournament, China naturalized 15 players – 11 of whom were of Chinese descent. While the team failed to earn a single point, it impressed by narrowly losing 2–3 to Germany, the defending Olympic silver medalist.

Beginning in 2023, the Chinese Ice Hockey Association moved away from naturalized players and committed to building a roster of domestic talent. The rejuvenated squad has managed to stay in Division IB for three consecutive years and, in November 2024, took part in the inaugural IIHF Asia Championship.

== Tournament record ==
=== Olympic Games ===
- 2022 – 12th place

=== World Championship record ===
- 1972 – 18th place (5th in Pool C)
- 1973 – 19th place (5th in Pool C)
- 1974 – 20th place (6th in Pool C)
- 1978 – 20th place (4th in Pool C)
- 1979 – 18th place (Pool B)
- 1981 – 18th place (2nd in Pool C). Promoted to Pool B
- 1982 – 15th place (6th in Pool B). Relegated to Pool C
- 1983 – 19th place (3rd in Pool C)
- 1985 – 19th place (3rd in Pool C)
- 1986 – 18th place (2nd in Pool C). Promoted to Pool B
- 1987 – 16th place (8th in Pool B). Relegated to Pool C
- 1989 – 19th place (3rd in Pool C)
- 1990 – 19th place (3rd in Pool C)
- 1991 – 18th place (2nd in Pool C). Promoted to Pool B
- 1992 – 19th place (7th in Pool B)
- 1993 – 19th place (7th in Pool B)
- 1994 – 20th place (8th in Pool B). Relegated to Pool C
- 1995 – 25th place (Pool C)
- 1996 – 27th place (Pool C)
- 1997 – 27th place (7th in Pool C)
- 1998 – 28th place (4th in Pool C)
- 1999 – 28th place (4th in Pool C)
- 2000 – 26th place (2nd in Pool C). Promoted to Division I
- 2001 – 27th place (5th in Division I, Group B)
- 2002 – 28th place (6th in Division I, Group B). Relegated to Division II
- 2003 – 32nd place (2nd in Division II, Group B)
- 2004 – 30th place (1st in Division II, Group A). Promoted to Division I
- 2005 – 28th place (6th in Division I, Group A). Relegated to Division II
- 2006 – 30th place (1st in Division II, Group B). Promoted to Division I
- 2007 – 28th place (6th in Division I, Group A). Relegated to Division II
- 2008 – 32nd place (2nd in Division II, Group B)
- 2009 – 34th place (3rd in Division II, Group A)
- 2010 – 38th place (5th in Division II, Group B)
- 2011 – 36th place (4th in Division II, Group B)
- 2012 – 36th place (2nd in Division II, Group B)
- 2013 – 38th place (4th in Division II, Group B)
- 2014 – 38th place (4th in Division II, Group B)
- 2015 – 35th place (1st in Division II, Group B) Promoted to Division II, Group A
- 2016 – 34th place (6th in Division II, Group A) Relegated to Division II, Group B
- 2017 – 35th place (1st in Division II, Group B) Promoted to Division II, Group A
- 2018 – 32nd place (4th in Division II, Group A)
- 2019 – 33rd place (5th in Division II, Group A)
- 2020 – Cancelled due to the COVID-19 pandemic
- 2021 – Cancelled due to the COVID-19 pandemic
- 2022 – 27th place (1st in Division II, Group A) Promoted to Division I, Group B
- 2023 – 25th place (3rd in Division I, Group B)
- 2024 – 26th place (4th in Division I, Group B)
- 2025 – 26th place (4th in Division I, Group B)
- 2026 – 24th place (2nd in Division I, Group B)

=== Asian Winter Games ===
Year	Host	Result	M	W	D	L	GF	GA	GD
1986	Japan	1	-	-	-	-	-	-	-
1990	Japan	1	-	-	-	-	-	-	-
1996	South Korea	3	-	-	-	-	-	-	-
1999	China	3	-	-	-	-	-	-	-
2003	Japan	3	-	-	-	-	-	-	-
2007	China	4	-	-	-	-	-	-	-
2011	Kazakhstan	4	-	-	-	-	-	-	-
2017	Japan	4	-	-	-	-	-	-	-
2025	China	4	8	3	0	5	30	24	+6
Total	-	9/9	40	19	4	20	222	215	+7

Key: OT = W / SO = D / Excluded Goals in SO

=== Asia Championship ===
- 2025 – 4th
- 2026 – 4th
- 2027 – 4th

== Head-to-head record ==
As of 14 February 2025 Teams named in italics are no longer active.

Team	GP	W	T	L	GF	GA
Australia	9	4	1	4	49	23
Austria	8	0	1	7	20	66
Belgium	8	5	0	3	52	29
Bulgaria	22	15	2	5	106	69
Canada	2	0	0	2	2	12
Chinese Taipei	3	3	0	0	26	3
Croatia	9	5	0	4	30	31
Denmark	16	6	2	8	52	87
East Germany	6	0	0	6	22	54
Estonia	10	3	0	7	28	73
France	11	3	2	6	41	67
Germany	1	0	0	1	2	3
Great Britain	8	3	0	5	30	62
Hungary	19	6	3	10	55	85
Iceland	8	4	0	4	26	33
Ireland	1	1	0	0	5	0
Israel	9	8	0	1	58	24
Italy	13	1	1	11	26	73
Japan	36	3	3	30	77	246
Kazakhstan	14	0	0	14	9	153
Kuwait	2	2	0	0	46	1
Latvia	1	0	0	1	0	22
Lithuania	5	2	1	2	22	17
Luxembourg	1	1	0	0	19	3
Macau	1	1	0	0	26	0
Mexico	7	5	0	2	27	22
Netherlands	21	4	0	17	50	151
New Zealand	9	4	0	5	35	33
North Korea	18	14	1	3	112	47
Norway	11	1	1	9	20	93
Poland	6	0	0	6	11	79
Romania	24	3	2	19	69	137
Serbia	9	4	0	5	35	29
Slovenia	3	0	0	3	4	28
South Africa	3	3	0	0	17	5
South Korea	24	15	2	7	129	71
Spain	12	8	0	4	59	40
Switzerland	5	0	1	4	12	54
Thailand	2	2	0	0	32	2
Turkey	3	2	0	1	14	10
Ukraine	5	1	0	4	8	36
United States	1	0	0	1	0	8
Yugoslavia	6	1	2	3	20	31
Total	390	143	25	224	1 483	2 112

== See also ==
- China women's national ice hockey team
- Ice hockey in China
- Chinese Ice Hockey Championship
- Beijing International Ice Hockey League
- Asia League Ice Hockey
- Supreme Hockey League
- Kontinental Hockey League
