= Guan Weinan =

Chinese ice hockey player

Personal information
- Nationality: Chinese
- Born: 10 October 1981 (age 43); Heilongjiang, China

Sport
- Sport: Ice hockey

Guan Weinan (born 10 October 1981) is a Chinese ice hockey player. She competed in the women's tournament at the 2002 Winter Olympics.
