= Gong Ming =

Chinese ice hockey player

- Born: 15 February 1973 (age 53)
- Height: 171 cm (5 ft 7 in)
- Weight: 68 kg (150 lb; 10 st 10 lb)
- Position: Defense
- Played for: Harbin Ice Hockey
- National team: China
- Playing career: c. 1996–1998

Gong Ming
- Traditional Chinese: 宫明
- Simplified Chinese: 宫明
Transcriptions
Standard Mandarin
- Hanyu Pinyin: Gōng Míng

Gong Ming (Chinese: 宫 明; pinyin: Gōng Míng; (born 15 February 1973) is a Chinese retired ice hockey player. As a member of the Chinese national team, she competed in the 1997 IIHF Women's World Championship and in the women's ice hockey tournament at the 1998 Winter Olympics in Nagano.

== Career statistics ==
Note: GP = Games played; G = Goals; A = Assists; Pts = Points; PIM = Penalty minutes;

				Regular season
Year	Team	Event	Result	GP	G	A	Pts	PIM
1997	China	WC	4th	5	1	1	2	12
1998	China	OG	4th	6	0	1	1	10
