= Guo Lili =

Chinese ice hockey player

- Born: 5 May 1976 (age 49)
- Height: 166 cm (5 ft 5 in)
- Weight: 60 kg (132 lb; 9 st 6 lb)
- Position: Forward
- National team: China
- Playing career: 1996–1999

Guo Lili (born 5 May 1976) is a retired Chinese ice hockey player. She competed in the women's tournament at the 1998 Winter Olympics.

== Career statistics ==
Note: GP = Games played; G = Goals; A = Assists; Pts = Points; PIM = Penalty minutes;

				Regular season
Year	Team	Event	Result	GP	G	A	Pts	PIM
1997	China	WC	4th	5	0	0	0	0
1998	China	OG	4th	1	0	0	0	0
1999	China	WC	5th	5	0	0	0	0
