= Shen Tiantian =

Chinese ice hockey player

Personal information
- Nationality: Chinese
- Born: 12 June 1982 (age 42); Heilongjiang, China

Sport
- Sport: Ice hockey

Shen Tiantian (born 12 June 1982) is a Chinese ice hockey player. She competed in the women's tournament at the 2002 Winter Olympics.
