= Daniel Daikawa =

American-born Japanese ice hockey player

- Born: July 30, 1971 (age 54) Apple Valley, Minnesota, USA
- Height: 5 ft 10 in (178 cm)
- Weight: 194 lb (88 kg; 13 st 12 lb)
- Position: Defense
- Shot: Right
- Played for: Japan; Kokudo; Oji Eagles
- National team: Japan
- NHL draft: Undrafted
- Playing career: 1994–2005

Daniel Daikawa (born April 8, 1971) is an American-born Japanese former ice hockey player. He was the general manager and head coach of the Brookings Blizzard of the North American Hockey League from 2014 to 2017.

Daikawa competed in the 1998, 1999, 2001 Men's World Ice Hockey Championships, and 2003 Men's World Ice Hockey Championships as a member of the Japan men's national ice hockey team.

== Awards and honors ==
Award	Year
All-CCHA Rookie Team	1991-92
