= Shin Yahata =

Japanese ice hockey player

Personal information
- Nationality: Japanese
- Born: 9 May 1974 (age 50); Stockholm, Sweden

Sport
- Sport: Ice hockey

Shin Yahata (八幡 真, Yahata Shin, born 9 May 1974) is a Japanese ice hockey player. He competed in the men's tournament at the 1998 Winter Olympics.
