= Aki Tsuchida =

Japanese ice hockey player

Personal information
- Nationality: Japanese
- Born: 29 May 1979 (age 45); Hokkaido, Japan

Sport
- Sport: Ice hockey

Aki Tsuchida (土田 亜希, Tsuchida Aki, born 29 May 1979) is a Japanese ice hockey player. She competed in the women's tournament at the 1998 Winter Olympics.
