= Kirill Zinovyev =

Kazakhstani ice hockey player (born 1979)

Kirill Zinovyev (born February 22, 1979) is a Kazakhstani goaltender who was the third string goalie for the Kazakhstan men's national ice hockey team in the 2006 Winter Olympics.
