= Yuji Iga =

Japanese ice hockey player

Personal information
- Nationality: Japanese
- Born: 18 July 1965 (age 59); Tomakomai, Japan

Sport
- Sport: Ice hockey

Yuji Iga (伊賀 裕治, Iga Yūji, born 18 July 1965) is a Japanese ice hockey player. He competed in the men's tournament at the 1998 Winter Olympics.
