= Atsuo Kudo =

Japanese ice hockey player

Personal information
- Nationality: Japanese
- Born: 9 January 1965 (age 60); Tomakomai, Japan

Sport
- Sport: Ice hockey

Atsuo Kudo (工藤 篤緒, Kudō Atsuo, born 9 January 1965) is a Japanese ice hockey player. He competed in the men's tournament at the 1998 Winter Olympics.
