= Japan men's national ice hockey team =

Men's national ice hockey team representing Japan

Japan
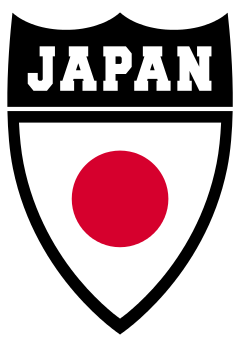
- Association: Japan Ice Hockey Federation
- Head coach: Jarrod Skalde
- Assistants: Masahito Haruna; Kei Tonosaki; Takeshi Yamanaka
- Captain: Teruto Nakajima
- Most games: Kenta Takagi (155)
- Top scorer: Toshiyuki Sakai (44)
- Most points: Norio Suzuki (85)
- Team colors
- IIHF code: JPN
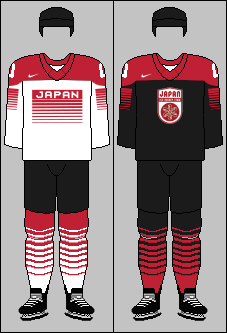

Ranking
- Current IIHF: 21 ▼1 (3 June 2026)
- Highest IIHF: 15 (2003–04)
- Lowest IIHF: 25 (2021–23)

First international
- Czechoslovakia 12–2 Japan (Davos, Switzerland; 24 January 1930)

Biggest win
- Japan 44–1 Kuwait (Gangneung, South Korea; 30 January 1999)

Biggest defeat
- Czechoslovakia 25–1 Japan (Moscow, Soviet Union; 4 March 1957)

Olympics
- Appearances: 8 (first in 1936)

IIHF World Championships
- Appearances: 49 (first in 1930)
- Best result: 8th (1930, 1957)

Asian Winter Games
- Appearances: 9 (first in 1986)
- Best result: Gold (2003, 2007) Silver (1986, 1990, 1996, 1999, 2011, 2025) Bronze (2017)

International record (W–L–T)
- 309–419–50

The Japanese national ice hockey team (Japanese: アイスホッケー男子日本代表 Aisuhokkē Danshi Nippon Daihyō) is the national men's ice hockey of Japan. They are controlled by the Japan Ice Hockey Federation and a member of the International Ice Hockey Federation (IIHF). As of 2025, Japan is ranked 20th in the IIHF World Ranking and 2nd in Asian Ranking. They currently compete in the IIHF World Championship Division I. They have competed in eight Olympic Games competitions. Team Japan are two-time Asian Winter Games champions (2003, 2007) and won the silver medal at the inaugural IIHF Asia Championship.

== Tournament participation ==
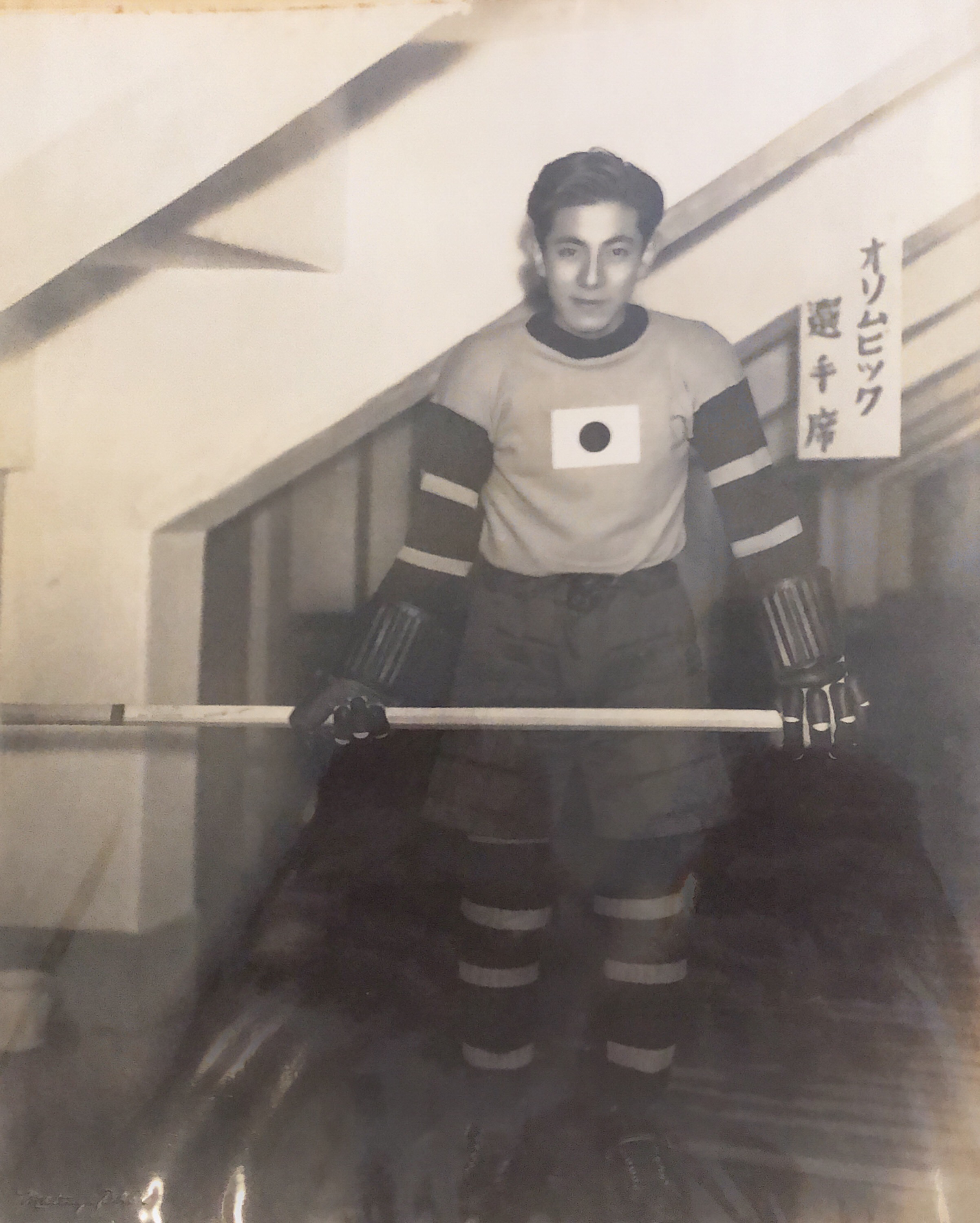
Kenichi Furuya in the Japanese national team at 1936 Winter Olympics

=== Winter Olympics ===
- 1936 – 9th place (tied)
- 1960 – 8th place
- 1964 – 11th place
- 1968 – 10th place
- 1972 – 9th place
- 1976 – 9th place
- 1980 – 12th place
- 1998 – 13th place

=== World Championship ===
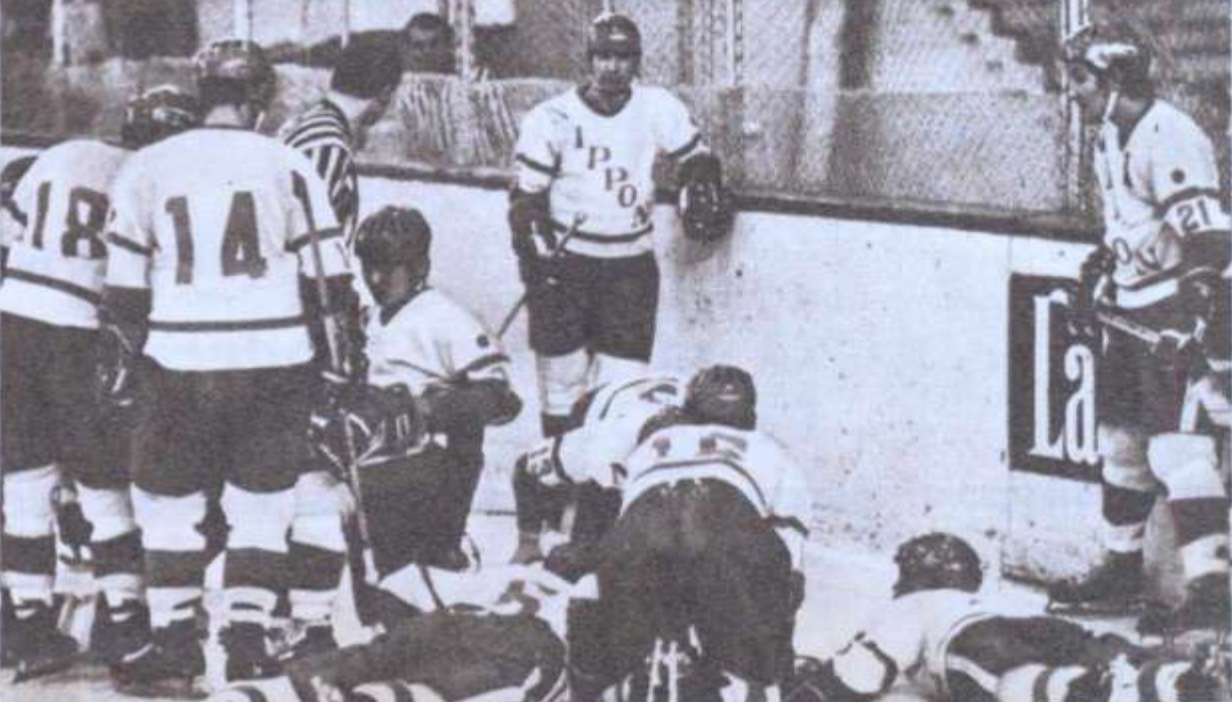
Japan national team in 1972

- 1930 – Finished in 9th place
- 1957 – Finished in 8th place
- 1962 – Finished in 9th place (1st in "Pool B")
- 1967 – Finished in 17th place (1st in "Pool C")
- 1969 – Finished in 15th place (1st in "Pool C")
- 1970 – Finished in 11th place (5th in "Pool B")
- 1971 – Finished in 12th place (6th in "Pool B")
- 1972 – Finished in 11th place (5th in "Pool B")
- 1973 – Finished in 12th place (6th in "Pool B")
- 1974 – Finished in 10th place (4th in "Pool B")
- 1975 – Finished in 12th place (6th in "Pool B")
- 1976 – Finished in 10th place (2nd in "Pool B")
- 1977 – Finished in 11th place (3rd in "Pool B")
- 1978 – Finished in 10th place (2nd in "Pool B")
- 1979 – Finished in 14th place (6th in "Pool B")
- 1981 – Finished in 16th place (8th in "Pool B")
- 1982 – Finished in 17th place (1st in "Pool C")
- 1983 – Finished in 13th place (5th in "Pool B")
- 1985 – Finished in 13th place (5th in "Pool B")
- 1986 – Finished in 15th place (8th in "Pool B")
- 1987 – Finished in 17th place (1st in "Pool C")
- 1989 – Finished in 15th place (7th in "Pool B")
- 1990 – Finished in 15th place (7th in "Pool B")
- 1991 – Finished in 16th place (8th in "Pool B")
- 1992 – Finished in 15th place (3rd in "Pool B")
- 1993 – Finished in 17th place (5th in "Pool B")
- 1994 – Finished in 16th place (4th in "Pool B")
- 1995 – Finished in 18th place (6th in "Pool B")
- 1996 – Finished in 20th place (8th in "Pool B")
- 1997 – Finished in 24th place (4th in "Pool C")
- 1998 – Finished in 14th place
- 1999 – Finished in 16th place
- 2000 – Finished in 16th place
- 2001 – Finished in 16th place
- 2002 – Finished in 16th place
- 2003 – Finished in 16th place
- 2004 – Finished in 15th place
- 2005 – Finished in 24th place (4th in Division I, Group A)
- 2006 – Finished in 22nd place (3rd in Division I, Group A)
- 2007 – Finished in 22nd place (3rd in Division I, Group B)
- 2008 – Finished in 21st place (3rd in Division I, Group B)
- 2009 – Finished in 21st place (3rd in Division I, Group A)
- 2010 – Finished in 21st place (3rd in Division I, Group A)
- 2011 – Withdrew from tournament citing the 2011 Tōhoku earthquake; remained in Group A
- 2012 – Finished in 20th place (4th in Division I, Group A)
- 2013 – Finished in 20th place (4th in Division I, Group A)
- 2014 – Finished in 19th place (3rd in Division I, Group A)
- 2015 – Finished in 20th place (4th in Division I, Group A)
- 2016 – Finished in 22nd place (6th in Division I, Group A)
- 2017 – Finished in 24th place (2nd in Division I, Group B)
- 2018 – Finished in 24th place (2nd in Division I, Group B)
- 2019 – Finished in 25th place (3rd in Division I, Group B)
- 2020 – Cancelled due to the COVID-19 pandemic
- 2021 – Cancelled due to the COVID-19 pandemic
- 2022 – Finished in 22nd place (2nd in Division I, Group B)
- 2023 – Finished in 23rd place (1st in Division I, Group B)
- 2024 – Finished in 21st place (5th in Division I, Group A)
- 2025 – Finished in 20th place (4th in Division I, Group A)
- 2026 – Finished in 22nd place (6th in Division I, Group A)

=== Asian Winter Games ===
Year	Host	Result	M	W	D	L	GF	GA	GD
1986	Japan	-	-	-	-	-	-	-	-
1990	Japan	-	-	-	-	-	-	-	-
1996	South Korea	-	-	-	-	-	-	-	-
1999	China	-	-	-	-	-	-	-	-
2003	Japan	-	-	-	-	-	-	-	-
2007	China	-	-	-	-	-	-	-	-
2011	Kazakhstan	-	-	-	-	-	-	-	-
2017	Japan	-	-	-	-	-	-	-	-
2025	China	2nd	8	4	1	3	46	21	+25
Total	-	9/9	39	27	3	9	334	81	+253

Key: OT = W / SO = D / Excluded Goals in SO

- 2025: JPN 3-3 KOR Supposed

=== Asia Championship ===
- 2025 – (silver) 2nd place
- 2026 – (bronze) 3rd place
- 2027 – (silver) 2nd place

== Honours ==
- IIHF World Championship Division I / Pool B
  - Winners: 1962 Pool B, 2023 (B)
- IIHF World Championship Division II / Pool C
  - Winners: 1967 Pool C, 1969 Pool C, 1982 Pool C, 1987 Pool C

== Notable coaches ==
- 1962, Tsutomu Kawabuchi
- 2022, Perry Pearn

== All-time record against other nations ==
As of 24 April 2025

Team	GP	W	T	L	GF	GA	GD
Australia	7	7	0	0	93	17	+76
Austria	45	14	5	26	130	176	–46
Belarus	7	1	1	5	14	27	–13
Belgium	1	1	0	0	24	0	+24
Bulgaria	11	8	0	3	66	29	+37
Canada	47	3	4	40	90	276	-186
China	36	30	3	3	246	77	+169
Chinese Taipei	2	2	0	0	33	0	+33
Croatia	6	6	0	0	30	6	+24
Czech Republic	4	0	0	4	10	31	–21
Czechoslovakia	9	0	0	9	12	112	-100
Denmark	34	19	1	14	147	112	+35
East Germany	16	3	1	12	45	89	–44
England	1	0	0	1	1	7	–6
Estonia	7	6	1	0	32	16	+16
Finland	8	0	1	7	15	65	–50
France	30	11	2	17	101	120	–19
Germany (Note: Includes matches against West Germany.)	23	2	0	21	57	138	–81
Great Britain	15	7	1	7	41	39	+2
Hungary	35	17	0	18	112	102	+10
Israel	1	1	0	0	7	1	+6
Italy	35	10	2	23	92	132	–40
Kazakhstan	23	3	3	17	52	101	–49
Kuwait	1	1	0	0	44	1	+43
Latvia	13	1	0	12	25	75	–50
Lithuania	10	8	0	2	45	19	+26
Netherlands	32	19	4	9	170	95	+75
North Korea	10	10	0	0	68	15	+53
Norway	39	14	8	17	133	163	–30
Poland	42	6	2	34	98	214	–116
Romania	31	17	2	12	140	113	+27
Russia	1	0	0	1	1	6	–5
Serbia	3	3	0	0	21	3	+18
Slovakia	5	0	0	5	12	39	–27
Slovenia	19	5	1	13	38	68	-30
South Korea	37	27	1	9	207	75	+132
Spain	2	2	0	0	17	5	+12
Sweden	4	0	0	4	1	44	–43
Switzerland	31	9	3	19	93	141	–48
Thailand	3	3	0	0	62	3	+59
Ukraine	18	8	2	8	44	45	–1
United States	12	1	0	11	33	103	–70
Yugoslavia	34	17	2	15	133	139	-6
Total	760	302	50	408	2 859	3 162	–303

== All-time record against other teams ==
As of 27 August 2016

Team	GP	W	T	L	GF	GA
(Canada) Battleford Millers	2	0	0	2	2	33
(Canada) Victoria Navy	1	0	0	1	1	9
Pacific Coast Amateur League All Stars	1	0	0	1	9	10
(Canada) Nanaimo Labatts	1	0	0	1	5	10
(Canada) Chilliwack Volvos	1	0	0	1	4	9
(Canada) Powell River Regals	4	1	0	3	3	31
(Canada) Kamloops Cariboos	1	0	0	1	1	6
(Canada) Central Alberta Hockey League All Stars	1	0	0	1	2	17
(Canada) Lethbridge Maple Leafs	1	0	1	0	4	4
(Canada) Regina Caps	1	0	0	1	5	9
(Canada) Brandon Wheat Kings	1	1	0	0	8	6
(Canada) Winnipeg Maroons	1	0	0	1	4	11
(Canada) Kenora Thistles	2	1	0	1	9	16
(Canada) Thunder Bay Junior League All Stars	2	0	0	2	8	12
(United States) Minnesota Golden Gophers	1	0	0	1	3	7
(Canada) New Westminster Royals	2	2	0	0	18	6
(Canada) Chilliwack Steelheads	1	0	0	1	4	10
(Canada) Victoria Commercial League All Stars	1	1	0	0	8	5
(Canada) Nanaimo Clippers	1	0	0	1	5	7
(United States) Portland Royals	1	1	0	0	11	4
(Canada) Victoria Intermediate All Stars	1	1	0	0	6	5
(Canada) Lethbridge Sugar Kings	1	1	0	0	5	2
(Canada) Yorkton Terriers	1	0	0	1	3	12
(Canada) Saskatchewan Junior League All Stars	1	1	0	0	12	4
(Canada) Manitoba South Junior All Stars	1	0	0	1	2	7
(Canada) Kingston Merchants	1	1	0	0	7	6
(Canada) Halifax Canadiens	1	1	0	0	7	4
(Canada) Grand Falls Cataracts	1	0	0	1	3	7
(Canada) Bathurst Papermakers	1	1	0	0	4	3
(Canada) Manitoba North Junior All Stars	1	1	0	0	8	6
(Canada) North Peace River League All Stars	1	1	0	0	7	4
(Canada) Prince George Mohawks	1	1	0	0	8	7
(Canada) Penticton Broncos	1	1	0	0	6	5
Finland B	4	1	0	3	1	16
Czechoslovakia B	1	0	0	1	2	9
USSR B	2	0	0	2	5	16
West Germany U20	1	1	0	0	4	3
(United States) Minnesota–Duluth Bulldogs	1	0	0	1	4	5
(United States) Western Michigan Broncos	1	0	0	1	4	9
(Russia) Spartak Moscow	1	0	0	1	2	13
(Canada) Saskatchewan Huskies	1	0	0	1	2	7
(United States) Michigan Tech Huskies	1	0	0	1	4	6
(United States) Alaska Gold Kings	1	1	0	0	4	1
(Russia) Amur Khabarovsk	15	1	1	13	13	60
Sweden B	2	0	0	2	2	17
Russia B	2	0	0	2	3	13
Canada B	1	0	1	0	4	4
Denmark B	1	0	0	1	1	4
Japan All Stars	1	0	0	1	5	6
(Finland) Tappara	1	0	0	1	3	6
(Finland) TPS Turku	1	0	0	1	4	5
(Sweden) Malmö Redhawks	1	0	0	1	2	3
(Germany) Schwenninger Wild Wings	1	0	0	1	2	5
(Switzerland) EV Zug	1	1	0	0	5	2
(Germany) Krefeld Pinguine	1	0	0	1	2	7
(Sweden) Modo Hockey	1	0	0	1	3	4
(Germany) Augsburger Panther	2	0	0	2	3	6
(Switzerland) HC Lugano	1	1	0	0	5	2
Switzerland B	2	1	0	1	4	9
(China) Qiqihar	2	0	0	2	5	22
(Russia) Khabarovsk	1	0	0	1	3	5
(Czech Republic) HC Pardubice	1	0	0	1	2	5
(Canada) Saint Georges Garaga	1	0	0	1	2	3
(Canada) Île-des-Chênes North Stars	1	1	0	0	4	1
(Russia) Salavat Yulaev Ufa	2	1	0	1	3	6
(Canada) Mid-West Islanders	2	2	0	0	13	3
(Slovakia) HKm Zvolen	1	0	1	0	3	3
(Germany) Frankfurt Lions	1	0	1	0	2	2
(Russia) Amurskie Tigry	1	1	0	0	4	3
(Russia) PSK Sakhalin	1	1	0	0	4	1
(Germany) Straubing Tigers	1	0	0	1	1	3
(Germany) Kölner Haie	1	0	0	1	1	5
(Germany) Düsseldorfer EG	1	0	0	1	1	2
Total	106	30	5	71	347	608

== See also ==
- All Japan Ice hockey Championship
- Japan men's national junior ice hockey team
- Japan men's national under-18 ice hockey team
- Japan women's national ice hockey team
