= Kunihiko Sakurai =

Japanese ice hockey player

Personal information
- Nationality: Japanese
- Born: 11 April 1972 (age 53) Tomakomai, Japan

Sport
- Sport: Ice hockey

Kunihiko Sakurai (桜井 邦彦, Sakurai Kunihiko; born 11 April 1972) is a Japanese former ice hockey right winger. He competed in the men's tournament at the 1998 Winter Olympics.
