= Diao Ying =

Chinese ice hockey player

- Born: 24 November 1974 (age 51)
- Height: 162 cm (5 ft 4 in)
- Weight: 62 kg (137 lb; 9 st 11 lb)
- Position: Forward
- Played for: Harbin Ice Hockey
- National team: China
- Playing career: c. 1996–2000
Medal record
Asian Winter Games
Gold medal – first place	1999 Gangneung	Ice hockey

Diao Ying (born 24 November 1974) is a Chinese retired ice hockey player. With the Chinese national team, she competed at the IIHF Women's World Championships in 1997 and 1999, in the women's ice hockey tournament at the 1998 Winter Olympics in Nagano, and won a gold medal in the women's ice hockey tournament at the 1999 Asian Winter Games.

Note: GP = Games played; G = Goals; A = Assists; Pts = Points; PIM = Penalty minutes;

				Regular season
Year	Team	Event	Result	GP	G	A	Pts	PIM
1997	China	WC	4th	5	0	0	0	4
1998	China	OG	4th	3	0	0	0	0
1999	China	WC	5th	5	0	0	0	2
