= Sergei Antipov =

Kazakhstani ice hockey player

- Born: May 15, 1974 (age 50); Tashkent, Uzbek SSR, Soviet Union
- Height: 5 ft 10 in (178 cm)
- Weight: 220 lb (100 kg; 15 st 10 lb)
- Position: Right wing
- Shot: Left
- Played for: Kazzinc-Torpedo; Sibir Novosibirsk; KH Sanok; Podhale Nowy Targ; Unia Oswiecim; Yenbek Almaty
- National team: Kazakhstan
- Playing career: 1991–2004

Sergei Anatolyevich Antipov (Russian: Серге́й Анатольевич Антипов, born May 15, 1974) is a Kazakhstani retired professional ice hockey player.

== Career ==
Antipov began his career with Torpedo Ust-Kamenogorsk in the Soviet Hockey Championship in 1991. He played with Torpedo until joining Sibir Novosibirsk for one season in the Vysshaya Liga. In the 1998–99 season, Antipov split time in the Polska Liga Hokejowa between KH Sanok and Podhale Nowy Targ, before joining Unia Oswiecim for the 1999–00 season. Antipov then returned to Kazzinc-Torpedo for three seasons, from 2000–2003, before finishing his career with Yenbek Almaty in 2004.

During his career, Antipov participated with the Kazakhstan men's national ice hockey team at the IIHF World Championships four times, in 1995, 2000, 2001, and 2002.
