= Denis Shemelin =

Kazakhstani ice hockey player

- Born: July 24, 1978 (age 46); Ust-Kamenogorsk, Soviet Union
- Height: 6 ft 3 in (191 cm)
- Weight: 191 lb (87 kg; 13 st 9 lb)
- Position: Defence
- Shot: Left
- KHL team: Amur Khabarovsk
- Playing career: 1994–2017

Denis Nikolaevich Shemelin (born July 24, 1978, in Ust-Kamenogorsk, Soviet Union) is a Kazakhstani professional ice hockey defenceman who currently plays for Amur Khabarovsk of the Kontinental Hockey League (KHL).

== Career statistics ==
=== Regular season and playoffs ===
| | | | Regular season | | | | | Playoffs |
| Season | Team | League | GP | G | A | Pts | PIM | GP | G | A | Pts | PIM |
|---|---|---|---|---|---|---|---|---|---|---|---|---|
| 1994–95 | Dynamo–2 Moscow | RUS.2 | 37 | 1 | 0 | 1 | 22 | — | — | — | — | — |
| 1995–96 | Dynamo–2 Moscow | RUS.2 | 24 | 0 | 1 | 1 | 18 | — | — | — | — | — |
| 1996–97 | Torpedo Ust–Kamenogorsk | RUS.2 | 18 | 1 | 0 | 1 | 8 | — | — | — | — | — |
| 1996–97 | Torpedo–2 Ust–Kamenogorsk | RUS.3 | 39 | 0 | 1 | 1 | 16 | — | — | — | — | — |
| 1997–98 | Torpedo Ust–Kamenogorsk | RUS.2 | 25 | 0 | 2 | 2 | 10 | — | — | — | — | — |
| 1997–98 | Torpedo–2 Ust–Kamenogorsk | RUS.3 | 5 | 2 | 2 | 4 | 4 | — | — | — | — | — |
| 1998–99 | Torpedo Ust–Kamenogorsk | RUS.2 | 32 | 3 | 6 | 9 | 24 | — | — | — | — | — |
| 1998–99 | Torpedo–2 Ust–Kamenogorsk | RUS.3 | 4 | 0 | 0 | 0 | 0 | — | — | — | — | — |
| 1999–2000 | Torpedo Ust–Kamenogorsk | RUS.3 | 42 | 2 | 11 | 13 | 48 | — | — | — | — | — |
| 2000–01 | Kazzinc–Torpedo | RUS.3 | 53 | 4 | 22 | 26 | 42 | — | — | — | — | — |
| 2001–02 | Kazzinc–Torpedo | RUS.2 | 41 | 6 | 3 | 9 | 34 | — | — | — | — | — |
| 2002–03 | Kazzinc–Torpedo | RUS.2 | 40 | 4 | 9 | 13 | 38 | — | — | — | — | — |
| 2003–04 | Kazzinc–Torpedo | KAZ | 19 | 4 | 3 | 7 | 14 | — | — | — | — | — |
| 2003–04 | Kazzinc–Torpedo | RUS.2 | 44 | 0 | 10 | 10 | 97 | — | — | — | — | — |
| 2004–05 | Neftekhimik Nizhnekamsk | RSL | 58 | 5 | 7 | 12 | 24 | 3 | 0 | 0 | 0 | 0 |
| 2005–06 | Neftekhimik Nizhnekamsk | RSL | 48 | 3 | 6 | 9 | 67 | 5 | 0 | 0 | 0 | 10 |
| 2006–07 | Neftekhimik Nizhnekamsk | RSL | 40 | 2 | 2 | 4 | 20 | 4 | 0 | 0 | 0 | 2 |
| 2007–08 | Kazzinc–Torpedo | RUS.2 | 14 | 1 | 3 | 4 | 22 | — | — | — | — | — |
| 2007–08 | Barys Astana | RUS.2 | 30 | 1 | 5 | 6 | 28 | 7 | 0 | 1 | 1 | 4 |
| 2008–09 | Barys Astana | KHL | 11 | 0 | 3 | 3 | 8 | — | — | — | — | — |
| 2008–09 | Lada Togliatti | KHL | 25 | 3 | 3 | 6 | 22 | 5 | 0 | 0 | 0 | 2 |
| 2009–10 | Lada Togliatti | KHL | 30 | 3 | 2 | 5 | 12 | — | — | — | — | — |
| 2009–10 | Amur Khabarovsk | KHL | 20 | 1 | 2 | 3 | 18 | — | — | — | — | — |
| 2010–11 | Amur Khabarovsk | KHL | 23 | 0 | 7 | 7 | 36 | — | — | — | — | — |
| 2011–12 | Molot Perm | VHL | 7 | 0 | 0 | 0 | 4 | — | — | — | — | — |
| 2011–12 | Kazzinc–Torpedo | VHL | 42 | 1 | 5 | 6 | 66 | 5 | 0 | 0 | 0 | 18 |
| 2012–13 | Kazzinc–Torpedo | VHL | 40 | 2 | 4 | 6 | 61 | 3 | 0 | 1 | 1 | 14 |
| 2013–14 | Kazzinc–Torpedo | VHL | 26 | 2 | 6 | 8 | 10 | 4 | 0 | 0 | 0 | 8 |
| 2014–15 | Kazzinc–Torpedo | VHL | 41 | 2 | 4 | 6 | 28 | 4 | 0 | 1 | 1 | 4 |
| 2015–16 | Arlan Kokshetau | KAZ | 50 | 4 | 10 | 14 | 50 | 7 | 0 | 0 | 0 | 20 |
| 2016–17 | Arlan Kokshetau | KAZ | 5 | 0 | 4 | 4 | 6 | — | — | — | — | — |
| 2016–17 | HK Almaty | KAZ | 31 | 3 | 7 | 10 | 18 | 2 | 0 | 0 | 0 | 4 |
| RUS.2 & VHL totals | | | 461 | 24 | 58 | 82 | 470 | 23 | 0 | 3 | 3 | 48 |
| RSL totals | | | 146 | 10 | 15 | 25 | 111 | 12 | 0 | 0 | 0 | 12 |
| KHL totals | | | 109 | 7 | 17 | 24 | 96 | 5 | 0 | 0 | 0 | 2 |

=== International ===
| Year | Team | Event | GP | G | A | Pts | PIM |
|---|---|---|---|---|---|---|---|
| 1997 | Kazakhstan | WJC B | 7 | 0 | 2 | 2 | 4 |
| 1998 | Kazakhstan | WJC | 7 | 0 | 1 | 1 | 4 |
| 1999 | Kazakhstan | WC B | 6 | 0 | 0 | 0 | 2 |
| 2000 | Kazakhstan | WC B | 7 | 0 | 0 | 0 | 4 |
| 2001 | Kazakhstan | WC D1 | 5 | 0 | 2 | 2 | 6 |
| 2002 | Kazakhstan | WC D1 | 5 | 2 | 2 | 4 | 2 |
| 2004 | Kazakhstan | WC | 2 | 0 | 0 | 0 | 2 |
| 2006 | Kazakhstan | OG | 5 | 0 | 0 | 0 | 4 |
| 2012 | Kazakhstan | WC | 5 | 0 | 1 | 1 | 8 |
| Junior totals | | | 14 | 0 | 3 | 3 | 8 |
| Senior totals | | | 35 | 2 | 5 | 7 | 28 |
