= Makoto Kawahira =

Japanese ice hockey player

Personal information
- Nationality: Japanese
- Born: 25 August 1971 (age 54) Tomakomai, Japan

Sport
- Sport: Ice hockey

Makoto Kawahira (川平 誠, Kawahira Makoto; born 25 August 1971) is a Japanese ice hockey player. He competed in the men's tournament at the 1998 Winter Olympics.
