= Anatoli Filatov =

Kazakhstani ice hockey player

- Born: April 28, 1975 Ust-Kamenogorsk, Kazakh SSR, Soviet Union
- Height: 5 ft 10 in (178 cm)
- Weight: 205 lb (93 kg; 14 st 9 lb)
- Position: Right wing
- Shot: Right
- Played for: Kazzinc-Torpedo; Niagara Falls Thunder; Sibir Novosibirsk; Torpedo Nizhny Novgorod; Spartak Moscow; Salavat Yulaev Ufa
- National team: Kazakhstan
- NHL draft: 158th overall, 1993; San Jose Sharks
- Playing career: 1992–2013

Anatoli Alexeyevich Filatov (Russian: Анатолий Алексеевич Фила́тов; born April 28, 1975) is a professional Kazakhstani ice hockey player, who played for Team Kazakhstan. He drafted 158th overall in the round seven of 1993 NHL entry draft by San Jose Sharks, but never actually signed a contract with them. He played Right Wing for Niagara Falls Thunder and Sibir Novosibirsk but never actually signed a contract with any of the other teams listed
