= Xu Lei (ice hockey) =

Chinese ice hockey player

- Born: 26 January 1977 (age 49) Heilongjiang, China
- Height: 166 cm (5 ft 5 in)
- Weight: 65 kg (143 lb; 10 st 3 lb)
- Position: Defense
- Shot: Left
- National team: China
- Playing career: 1993–2002

Xu Lei (Chinese: 徐蕾, born 26 January 1977) is a retired Chinese ice hockey defender. She competed in the women's tournaments at the 1998 Winter Olympics and the 2002 Winter Olympics.

== Career statistics ==
Note: GP = Games played; G = Goals; A = Assists; Pts = Points; PIM = Penalty minutes;

				Regular season
Year	Team	Event	Result	GP	G	A	Pts	PIM
1994	China	WC	4th	5	0	0	0	0
1997	China	WC	4th	5	1	1	2	4
1998	China	OG	4th	6	0	1	1	4
1999	China	WC	5th	5	0	0	0	2
2000	China	WC	6th	5	0	2	2	2
2001	China	WC	6th	5	1	2	3	6
2002	China	OG	7th	5	0	0	0	6
