= Akiko Naka =

Japanese ice hockey player

Personal information
- Nationality: Japanese
- Born: 5 June 1980 (age 44); Hokkaido, Japan

Sport
- Sport: Ice hockey

Akiko Naka (仲 晶子, Naka Akiko, born 5 June 1980) is a Japanese ice hockey player. She competed in the women's tournament at the 1998 Winter Olympics.
