= Kiyoshi Fujita =

Japanese-Canadian ice hockey player

Personal information
- Nationality: Japanese
- Born: 25 June 1972 (age 52); Lethbridge, Alberta, Canada

Sport
- Sport: Ice hockey

Kiyoshi Fujita (藤田 キヨシ, Fujita Kiyoshi, born 25 June 1972) is a Japanese-Canadian ice hockey player. He competed in the men's tournament at the 1998 Winter Olympics. Born Ryan Fujita, he changed his name to Kiyoshi Fujita after becoming a Japanese citizen in 1997.
