= Toshiyuki Sakai =

Japanese ice hockey player

Personal information
- Nationality: Japanese
- Born: 3 September 1964 (age 60); Tomakomai, Japan

Sport
- Sport: Ice hockey

Toshiyuki Sakai (坂井 寿如, Sakai Yoshiyuki, born 3 September 1964) is a Japanese ice hockey player. He was a team captain in the men's tournament at the 1998 Winter Olympics, and represented Japan in the World Championships fifteen times.
