= Li Xuan (ice hockey) =

Chinese ice hockey player

- Born: 29 February 1972 (age 53) Hebei, China
- Height: 169 cm (5 ft 7 in)
- Weight: 68 kg (150 lb; 10 st 10 lb)
- Position: Defense
- Shot: Left
- National team: China
- Playing career: 1996–2004

Li Xuan (Chinese: 李煊; pinyin: Lǐ Xuān; born 29 February 1972) is a retired Chinese ice hockey defender. She competed in the women's tournaments at the 1998 Winter Olympics and the 2002 Winter Olympics.

== Career statistics ==
Note: GP = Games played; G = Goals; A = Assists; Pts = Points; PIM = Penalty minutes;

| | | | | Regular season |
| Year | Team | Event | Result | GP | G | A | Pts | PIM |
|---|---|---|---|---|---|---|---|---|
| 1997 | China | WC | 4th | 5 | 0 | 3 | 3 | 6 |
| 1998 | China | OG | 4th | 6 | 0 | 1 | 1 | 6 |
| 1999 | China | WC | 5th | 5 | 0 | 0 | 0 | 4 |
| 2000 | China | WC | 6th | 5 | 1 | 1 | 2 | 10 |
| 2001 | China | WC | 6th | 5 | 0 | 1 | 1 | 6 |
| 2002 | China | OG | 7th | 5 | 0 | 0 | 0 | 2 |
| 2004 | China | WC | 7th | 4 | 0 | 0 | 0 | 4 |
