= Chen Jing (ice hockey) =

Chinese ice hockey player (born 1971)

- Born: 22 April 1971 (age 54) Shandong, China
- Height: 166 cm (5 ft 5 in)
- Weight: 68 kg (150 lb; 10 st 10 lb)
- Position: Defense
- Shot: Left
- National team: China
- Playing career: 1996–2002

Chen Jing (Chinese: 陈晶, born 22 April 1971), is a Chinese retired ice hockey defender who played for the Chinese national team at the 1998 Winter Olympics and 2002 Winter Olympics. She played for the national team from 1996 to 2002.

== Career statistics ==
Note: GP = Games played; G = Goals; A = Assists; Pts = Points; PIM = Penalty minutes;

				Regular season
Year	Team	Event	Result	GP	G	A	Pts	PIM
1997	China	WC	4th	5	0	3	3	6
1998	China	OG	4th	6	0	0	0	2
1999	China	WC	5th	5	0	1	1	2
2000	China	WC	6th	5	0	0	0	0
2001	China	WC	6th	5	0	0	0	0
2002	China	OG	7th	5	0	1	1	4
