= Lü Yan (ice hockey) =

Chinese ice hockey player

- Born: 25 July 1972 (age 53) Shandong, China
- Height: 165 cm (5 ft 5 in)
- Weight: 60 kg (132 lb; 9 st 6 lb)
- Position: Defense
- Shot: Left
- National team: China
- Playing career: 1996–2004

Lü Yan (Chinese: 吕岩, born 25 July 1972), is a retired Chinese ice hockey defender who played for the Chinese women's national team at the 1998 Winter Olympics.

== Career statistics ==
Note: GP = Games played; G = Goals; A = Assists; Pts = Points; PIM = Penalty minutes;

				Regular season
Year	Team	Event	Result	GP	G	A	Pts	PIM
1997	China	WC	4th	5	0	2	2	16
1998	China	OG	4th	6	0	1	1	6
1999	China	WC	5th	5	0	0	0	2
2000	China	WC	6th	5	0	0	0	2
2001	China	WC	6th	5	1	1	2	0
2004	China	WC	7th	4	1	2	3	2
