= Ma Xiaojun =

Chinese ice hockey player

- Born: 12 July 1978 (age 47)
- Height: 166 cm (5 ft 5 in)
- Weight: 65 kg (143 lb; 10 st 3 lb)
- Position: Forward
- Shot: Left
- National team: China
- Playing career: 1996–2005

Ma Xiaojun (simplified Chinese: 马晓军; traditional Chinese: 馬曉軍; pinyin: Mǎ Xiǎojūn; born 12 July 1978) is a retired Chinese ice hockey forward. She competed in the women's tournaments at the 1998 Winter Olympics and the 2002 Winter Olympics. Later in her career, she became an ice hockey coach.

Her daughter Zhu Xinyi (朱欣怡) is also an ice hockey player.

== Career statistics ==
Note: GP = Games played; G = Goals; A = Assists; Pts = Points; PIM = Penalty minutes;

				Regular season
Year	Team	Event	Result	GP	G	A	Pts	PIM
1997	China	WC	4th	5	0	1	1	2
1998	China	OG	4th	1	0	0	0	0
1999	China	WC	5th	5	0	0	0	2
2000	China	WC	6th	5	0	0	0	6
2001	China	WC	6th	5	1	0	1	4
2002	China	OG	7th	5	1	0	1	2
2004	China	WC	7th	4	1	2	3	2
2005	China	WC	6th	5	0	1	1	4
2006	China	OGQ	DNQ	3	3	1	4	0
