= Japan women's national ice hockey team =

Japan
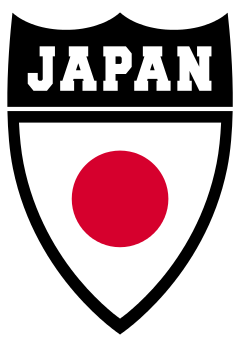
- Nickname: Smile Japan スマイルジャパン
- Association: Japan Ice Hockey Federation
- Head coach: Tomohito Okubo
- Assistants: Jun Hanzawa; Hanae Kubo
- Captain: Aoi Shiga
- Most games: Shiori Koike (129)
- Top scorer: Hanae Kubo (65)
- Most points: Hanae Kubo (130)
- IIHF code: JPN
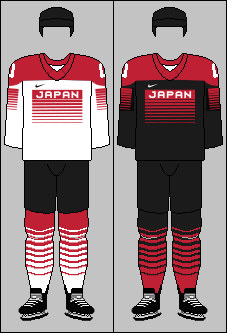

Ranking
- Current IIHF: 8 ▼1 (3 June 2026)
- Highest IIHF: 6 (first in 2019)
- Lowest IIHF: 11 (first in 2011)

First international
- Japan 5–2 Netherlands (North York or Mississauga, Canada; 21 April 1987)

Biggest win
- Japan 46–0 Hong Kong (Sapporo, Japan; 21 February 2017)

Biggest defeat
- Canada 18–0 Japan (Ottawa, Canada; 22 March 1990); Canada 18–0 Japan (Richmond, Canada; 5 April 1996)

Olympics
- Appearances: 5 (first in 1998)

World Championships
- Appearances: 22 (first in 1990)
- Best result: 5th (2022)

Asian Winter Games
- Appearances: 6 (first in 1996)
- Best result: (gold) Gold (2017)

Challenge Cup of Asia
- Appearances: 3 (first in 2010)
- Best result: (gold) Gold (2011, 2012)

International record (W–L–T)
- 169–156–6

The Japanese women's national ice hockey team (Japanese: アイスホッケー女子日本代表, Hepburn: Aisuhokkē Joshi Nippon Daihyō) represents Japan at the International Ice Hockey Federation's Women's World Championships, the Winter Olympics, and at other international ice hockey tournaments. The women's national team is governed by the Japan Ice Hockey Federation. Japan had 2,587 female players registered with the IIHF in 2017 and 1,439 as of 2020.

The nickname of Japan women's team is "Smile Japan" (Japanese: スマイルジャパン, Hepburn: Sumairu Japan).

== Tournament record ==
=== Olympic Games ===
- 1998 – Finished in 6th place
- 2014 – Finished in 7th place
- 2018 – Finished in 6th place
- 2022 – Finished in 6th place
- 2026 – Finished in 9th place

=== World Championship ===
- 1990 – Finished in 8th place
- 1999 – Finished in 9th place (1st in Group B, Promoted to Top Division)
- 2000 – Finished in 8th place (Relegated to Division I).
- 2001 – Finished in 10th place (2nd in Division I).
- 2003 – Finished in 9th place (1st in Group B, Promoted to Top Division)
- 2004 – Finished in 9th place (Relegated to Division I)
- 2005 – Finished in 10th place (2nd in Division I)
- 2007 – Finished in 10th place (1st in Group B, Promoted to Top Division)
- 2008 – Finished in 7th place
- 2009 – Finished in 8th place (Relegated to Division I)
- 2011 – Withdrew from the tournament due to an earthquake
- 2012 – Finished in 11th place (3rd in Division IA)
- 2013 – Finished in 9th place (1st in Division IA, Promoted to Top Division)
- 2015 – Finished in 7th place
- 2016 – Finished in 8th place (Relegated to Division I)
- 2017 – Finished in 9th place (1st in Division IA, Promoted to Top Division)
- 2019 – Finished in 8th place
- 2020 – Cancelled due to the COVID-19 pandemic
- 2021 – Finished in 6th place
- 2022 – Finished in 5th place
- 2023 – Finished in 7th place
- 2024 – Finished in 8th place
- 2025 – Finished in 7th place
- 2026 – Finished in 10th place (Relegated to Division I)
- 2027 – (Division IA)

=== Asian Games ===
- 1996 – Finished in 2nd place (silver)
- 1999 – Finished in 2nd place (silver)
- 2003 – Finished in 2nd place (silver)
- 2007 – Finished in 2nd place (silver)
- 2011 – Finished in 2nd place (silver)
- 2017 – Finished in 1st place (gold)
- 2025 – Finished in 1st place (gold)

=== IIHF Challenge Cup of Asia ===
- 2010 – Finished in 2nd place (silver)
- 2011 – Finished in 1st place (gold)
- 2012 – Finished in 1st place (gold)

=== IIHF Asia Championship ===
- 2025 – Finished in 1st place (gold)
- 2026 – Finished in 1st place (gold)
- 2027 – Finished in 1st place (gold)

=== Pacific Rim Championship ===
- 1995 – Finished in 4th place
- 1996 – Finished in 4th place

== Team ==
=== Current roster ===
The roster for the 2026 IIHF Women's World Championship.

Head coach: Tomohito Okubo

No.	Pos.	Name	Height	Weight	Birthdate	Team
2	D	Natsuki Okumura	1.76 m (5 ft 9 in)	70 kg (150 lb)	14 May 2006 (age 20)	(Japan) Toyota Cygnus
4	D	Ayaka Tomiuchi	1.58 m (5 ft 2 in)	59 kg (130 lb)	24 April 2003 (age 23)	(Japan) Daishin IHC
5	D	Shiori Yamashita	1.58 m (5 ft 2 in)	59 kg (130 lb)	28 April 2002 (age 24)	(Japan) Seibu Princess Rabbits
6	D	Kika Terauchi	1.66 m (5 ft 5 in)	75 kg (165 lb)	2 June 2008 (age 18)	(Canada) Mississauga Jr. Hurricanes
8	D	Kohane Sato – A	1.64 m (5 ft 5 in)	62 kg (137 lb)	16 March 2006 (age 20)	(Japan) Daishin IHC
9	D	An Shinoda	1.64 m (5 ft 5 in)	63 kg (139 lb)	3 July 2004 (age 22)	(Japan) Mikage Gretz
10	F	Hikaru Yamashita	1.57 m (5 ft 2 in)	53 kg (117 lb)	23 September 2000 (age 26)	(Japan) Seibu Princess Rabbits
11	F	Akane Shiga	1.65 m (5 ft 5 in)	64 kg (141 lb)	3 March 2001 (age 25)	(United States) Detroit Clutch
13	F	Yumeka Wajima	1.56 m (5 ft 1 in)	49 kg (108 lb)	19 October 2002 (age 24)	(Japan) DK Peregrine
17	F	Wakana Kurosu	1.61 m (5 ft 3 in)	62 kg (137 lb)	3 June 2000 (age 26)	(Japan) DK Peregrine
18	F	Ai Tada	1.58 m (5 ft 2 in)	61 kg (134 lb)	4 April 2006 (age 20)	(Japan) Daishin IHC
19	F	Makoto Ito	1.69 m (5 ft 7 in)	74 kg (163 lb)	2 May 2004 (age 22)	(Japan) Toyota Cygnus
20	G	Miyuu Masuhara	1.57 m (5 ft 2 in)	53 kg (117 lb)	4 October 2004 (age 22)	(Austria) Sabres St. Pölten
21	F	Marin Nagaoka	1.58 m (5 ft 2 in)	63 kg (139 lb)	27 July 2002 (age 24)	(Japan) Seibu Princess Rabbits
24	D	Kanami Seki – A	1.68 m (5 ft 6 in)	66 kg (146 lb)	23 June 2000 (age 26)	(Finland) TPS
27	F	Remi Koyama	1.47 m (4 ft 10 in)	52 kg (115 lb)	17 July 2000 (age 26)	(Japan) Seibu Princess Rabbits
30	G	Rei Halloran	1.70 m (5 ft 7 in)	65 kg (143 lb)	22 March 2001 (age 25)	(Sweden) Timrå IK
31	G	Riko Kawaguchi	1.66 m (5 ft 5 in)	64 kg (141 lb)	19 September 2004 (age 22)	(Japan) Daishin IHC
40	F	Rio Noro	1.64 m (5 ft 5 in)	61 kg (134 lb)	15 May 2004 (age 22)	(Japan) Daishin IHC
41	F	Riri Noro	1.61 m (5 ft 3 in)	58 kg (128 lb)	15 May 2004 (age 22)	(Japan) Daishin IHC
72	D	Aoi Shiga – C	1.65 m (5 ft 5 in)	61 kg (134 lb)	4 July 1999 (age 27)	(Sweden) Luleå HF
73	F	Hinata Lack	1.58 m (5 ft 2 in)	54 kg (119 lb)	19 December 2003 (age 22)	(Japan) DK Peregrine
91	F	Umeka Odaira	1.62 m (5 ft 4 in)	56 kg (123 lb)	12 December 2008 (age 17)	(Canada) North York Storm

=== Notable former players ===
- Nonaka Emi
- Masako Sato
- Rie Sato
- Adachi Yurie

=== Coaches ===
- 1990 World Championship – Noriko Fukuda
- 1995 to 1998 – Wally Kozak (coach-mentor)
- 1998 Winter Olympics – Toru Itabashi (head coach), Tsutomu Kawabuchi
- 1999 World Championship B – Takayuki Hatanda
- 2000 World Championship – Takayuki Hatanda
- 2001 World Championship D1 – Takayuki Hatanda
- 2003 World Championship D1 – Masayuki Takahashi
- 2004 World Championship – Kenji Nobuta (head coach), Tsutomu Kawabuchi (assistant coach, team manager)
- 2005 World Championship D1 – Kenji Nobuta
- 2007 World Championship D1 – Kohichi Satoh
- 2008 World Championship – Yuji Iizuka
- 2009 World Championship – Yuji Iizuka
- 2012 World Championship D1A – Yuji Iizuka
- 2013 World Championship D1A – Yuji Iizuka
- 2014 Winter Olympics – Yuji Iizuka
- 2015 World Championship – Yoshifumi Fujisawa
- 2016 World Championship – Yoshifumi Fujisawa
- 2017 World Championship D1A – Takeshi Yamanaka
- 2018 Winter Olympics – Takeshi Yamanaka
- 2019 World Championship – Yuji Iizuka
- 2021 World Championship – Yuji Iizuka
- 2022 Winter Olympics – Yuji Iizuka
- 2022 World Championship – Yuji Iizuka
- 2023 World Championship – Yuji Iizuka

Source: IIHF Guide & Record Book 2020

== All-time record against other nations ==
Last match update: 10 March 2022

Key
Positive balance (more Wins)
Neutral balance (Wins = Losses)
Negative balance (more Losses)

Team	GP	W	T	L	GF	GA
Czech Republic	27	22	0	5	79	46
France	19	17	1	1	72	20
South Korea	11	11	0	0	139	2
Denmark	12	11	0	1	48	13
Austria	10	10	0	0	42	9
Norway	9	7	0	2	31	17
North Korea	7	6	0	1	35	12
Latvia	6	5	0	1	27	7
Hungary	5	4	0	1	15	8
Slovakia	6	4	0	2	23	11
Kazakhstan	11	6	0	5	31	20
Hong Kong	1	1	0	0	46	0
Thailand	1	1	0	0	37	0
Germany	33	15	2	16	68	68
China	38	18	0	20	96	122
Canada	6	0	0	6	0	82
United States	10	0	0	10	2	110
Sweden	18	4	0	14	24	82
Switzerland	28	6	3	19	47	70
Finland	16	1	0	15	13	67
Russia	21	2	0	19	31	71
Total	295	151	6	138	906	837

== See also ==
- Japan men's national ice hockey team
- Japan women's national under-18 ice hockey team
