= Yang Xiuqing (ice hockey) =

Chinese ice hockey player

- Born: 9 February 1975 (age 50)
- Height: 165 cm (5 ft 5 in)
- Weight: 60 kg (132 lb; 9 st 6 lb)
- Position: Forward
- Shot: Left
- National team: China
- Playing career: 1996–2002

Yang Xiuqing (simplified Chinese: 杨秀青; traditional Chinese: 楊秀青; pinyin: Yáng Xiùqīng; born 9 February 1975) is a retired Chinese ice hockey player. She competed in the women's tournaments at the 1998 Winter Olympics and the 2002 Winter Olympics.

== Career statistics ==
Note: GP = Games played; G = Goals; A = Assists; Pts = Points; PIM = Penalty minutes;

				Regular season
Year	Team	Event	Result	GP	G	A	Pts	PIM
1997	China	WC	4th	5	2	2	4	8
1998	China	OG	4th	6	3	2	5	12
1999	China	WC	5th	5	0	0	0	6
2000	China	WC	6th	5	0	0	0	6
2001	China	WC	6th	5	0	1	1	6
2002	China	OG	7th	5	3	1	4	14
