= Takeshi Yamanaka =

Japanese ice hockey player

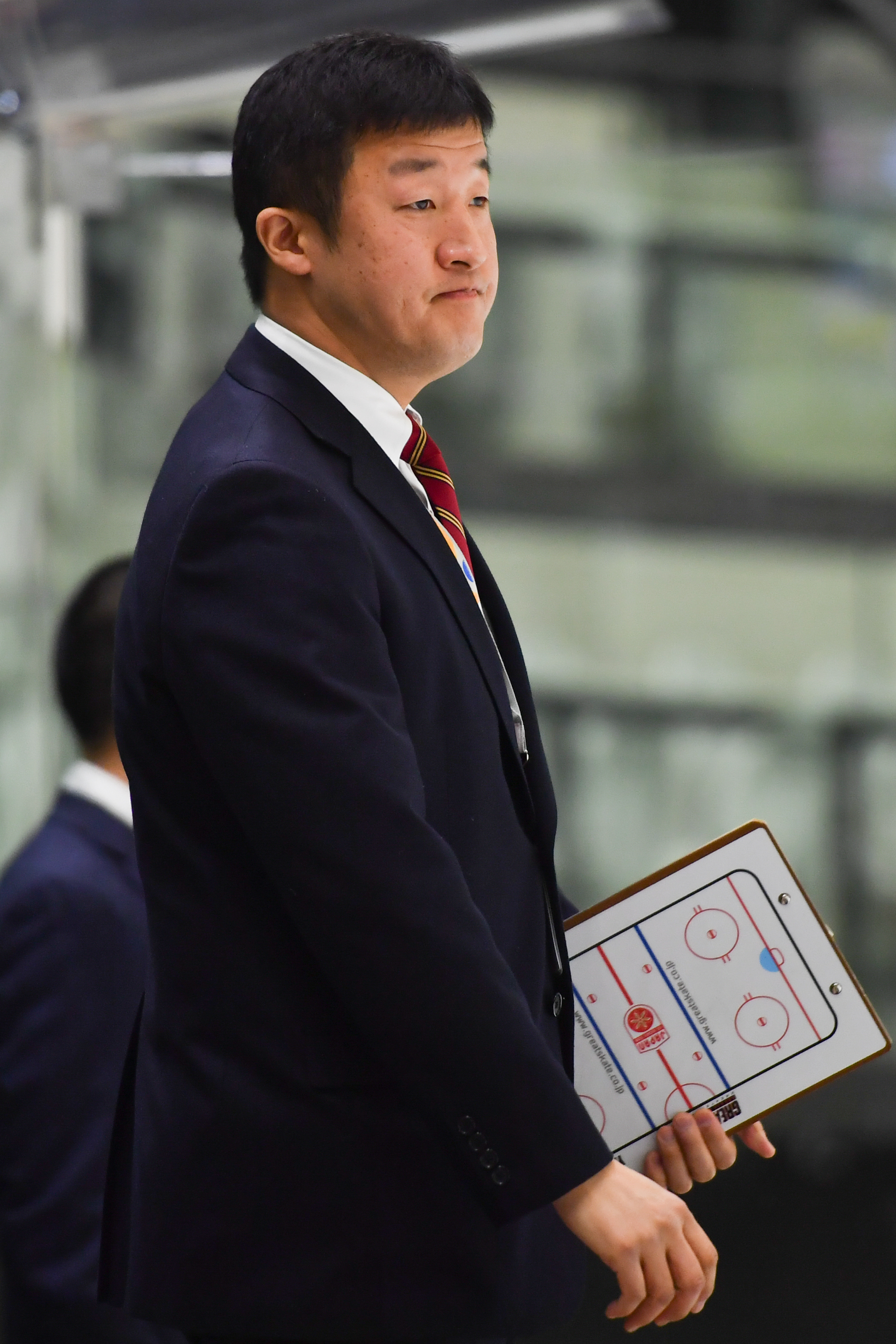
- at the 2017 IIHF Ice Hockey Ladies World Championship

Personal information
- Nationality: Japanese
- Born: 30 January 1971 (age 54); Tomakomai, Hokkaido, Japan

Sport
- Sport: Ice hockey

Takeshi Yamanaka (山中 武司, Yamanaka Takeshi, born 30 January 1971) is a former professional Japanese ice hockey player and current coach. He competed with Team Japan as a defenceman in the men's ice hockey tournament at the 1998 Winter Olympics. He also was the head coach of the women's ice hockey tournament Team Japan at the 2018 Winter Olympics.

Having coached professionally in the Asia League and at the national level, he is currently the assistant coach for the Japanese Men's National Ice Hockey Team.

== Playing career ==
Yamanaka made his professional debut with the Oji Seishi in the 1989-1990 season. The following year, he made his international debut with the Japanese Under-20 men's national ice hockey team at the World Junior Championships. Over 11 seasons with Oji, he played in 393 games, scoring 43 times and totalling 119 points. He was also a defenceman on the Japanese Men's Olympic Ice Hockey Team at the 1998 Nagano Olympics, totalling 2 assists over 4 games. Team Japan placed 13th. After the conclusion of the 2001-2002 season, Yamanaka retired from playing professional hockey.

== Coaching career ==
Yamanaka made his coaching debut with the Oji Eagles in the 2007-2008 season and later that year would coach Team Japan to a bronze medal at the World Championships. After leaving the Eagles organization at the conclusion of the 2013-2014 season, Yamanaka took up the position of coaching Smile Japan. He initially served as their assistant coach before becoming their head coach in 2016. Yamanaka was the head coach of the Japanese Women's Olympic Ice Hockey Team at the PyeongChang 2018 Olympic Winter Games, where the team finished 6th. In the 2018-2019 season, he was the head coach of the U18 Team Japan.

At the beginning of the 2019-2020 season, Yamanaka began coaching as the assistant coach of the Kanata Lasers in preparation for becoming the head coach of Japan's men's national ice hockey team. He volunteered as the assistant coach of Kanata Blazers in the OBMHL for the 2019-2020 season.

In July 2020, Yamanaka was hired by the Nepean Raiders to serve as their assistant coach for the 2020-2021 hockey season.

Upon the conclusion of the season, he returned to Japan, where he served as the assistant coach on the U20 and senior squad, competing at the World Junior Championships (for U20), World Championships, Universiade, and Olympic Games Qualifiers tournaments.

== Reputation ==
Yamanaka has a highly regarded reputation as a professional hockey coach. His style of coaching captivates the players' attention no matter the style of a practice drill or the situation in the game. Yamanaka's revered calmness and professionalism is believed to have led him to his coaching successes.
