= Akihito Sugisawa =

Japanese ice hockey player

Personal information
- Nationality: Japanese
- Born: 20 July 1967 (age 58) Tomakomai, Japan

Sport
- Sport: Ice hockey

Akihito Sugisawa (杉沢 明人, Sugisawa Akihito; born 20 July 1967) is a Japanese former ice hockey player. He competed in the men's tournament at the 1998 Winter Olympics.
