= Ice hockey at the 2007 Asian Winter Games =

- Venue: Fuao Ice Hockey Rink; Jilin Provincial Skating Rink
- Dates: 26 January – 3 February 2007
- Competitors: 330 from 11 nations

Ice hockey was featured as part of the 2007 Asian Winter Games at the Changchun Fuao Ice Hockey Rink for the Men's and at the Jilin Provincial Skating Rink for the Women's in Changchun. Events were held from 26 January to 3 February 2007.

According to the IIHF World Ranking, Kazakhstan (ranked 11th) were the highest rated team in men's ice hockey, followed by Japan (21st) and China (28th). In the women's World Ranking, China were rated 7th, Kazakhstan 9th and Japan 10th, with North Korea also in the top 20.

== Schedule ==
●	Round	P	Preliminary round	C	Classification	●	Final round	●	Last round

Event↓/Date →	26th Fri	27th Sat	28th Sun	29th Mon	30th Tue	31st Wed	1st Thu	2nd Fri	3rd Sat
Men	P	P		P	C	●	●	C	●
Women			●	●		●	●	●	●

== Medalists ==
Event	Gold	Silver	Bronze
Men	Japan; Masahito Haruna; Jun Tonosaki; Kengo Ito; Fumitaka Miyauchi; Yosuke Kon; Sho Sato; Toru Kamino; Masahito Nishiwaki; Go Tanaka; Daisuke Obara; Yoshinori Iimura; Takahito Suzuki; Takeshi Saito; Shinya Yanadori; Hideyuki Osawa; Ryuichi Kawai; Akifumi Okuyama; Tetsuya Saito; Masato Domeki; Mitsuaki Inoue; Naoya Kikuchi; Masahiro Kawamura	Kazakhstan; Yevgeniy Mazunin; Alexey Korshkov; Andrey Trochshinskiy; Vadim Rifel; Talgat Zhailauov; Alexandr Koreshkov; Oleg Yeremeyev; Yevgeniy Koreshkov; Alexey Gubarev; Oleg Kovalenko; Andrey Ogorodnikov; Lev Krutokhvostov; Anton Komissarov; Maxim Komissarov; Andrey Savenkov; Sergey Miroshnichenko; Sergey Alexandrov; Sergey Ogureshnikov; Yevgeniy Ushkov; Konstantin Kassatkin; Artyom Argokov; Sergey Yakovenko	South Korea; Park Woo-sang; Yoon Kyung-won; Lee Kwon-joon; Kim Hong-il; Hong Hyun-mok; Suh Sin-il; Choi Jung-sik; Kim Han-sung; Lee Myung-woo; Kim Yoon-hwan; Hwang Byung-wook; Lee Yong-jun; Kim Kyu-hun; Jeon Jin-ho; Kim Ki-sung; Son Ho-seung; Oh Hyon-ho; Kim Kyung-tae; Lee Kwon-jae; Park Sung-min; Eum Hyun-seung
Women	Kazakhstan; Darya Obydennova; Xeniya Yelfimova; Alexandra Babushkina; Galina Shu; Lyubov Ibragimova; Olga Potapova; Tatyana Shtelmaister; Zarina Tukhtiyeva; Viktoriya Adiyeva; Larissa Sviridova; Yevgeniya Ivchenko; Olga Kryukova; Yekaterina Ryzhova; Viktoriya Sazonova; Albina Suprun; Tatyana Koroleva; Alena Fux; Vera Nazyrova; Svetlana Maltseva; Svetlana Vassina	Japan; Azusa Nakaoku; Haruna Kumano; Yoko Kondo; Emi Nonaka; Etsuko Wada; Tomoe Yamane; Ami Mashiko; Yuki Togawa; Yurie Adachi; Aki Fujii; Shoko Nihonyanagi; Yae Kawashima; Moemi Nakamura; Yuka Hirano; Tomoko Sakagami; Yoko Otani; Hanae Kubo; Chiaki Yamanaka; Kanae Aoki; Nana Fujimoto	China; Huo Lina; Yu Baiwei; Su Ziwei; Li Xiuli; Fu Yue; Sang Hong; Zhang Ben; Huang Haijing; Jin Fengling; Ding Xiaolin; Sun Rui; Ma Rui; Cui Shanshan; Wang Linuo; Jiang Na; Tan Anqi; Zhang Jing; Wang Nan; Gao Fujin; Shi Yao; Qi Xueting; Zhang Shuang

== Medal table ==
Rank	Nation	Gold	Silver	Bronze	Total
1	Japan (JPN)	1	1	0	2
1	Kazakhstan (KAZ)	1	1	0	2
3	China (CHN)	0	0	1	1
3	South Korea (KOR)	0	0	1	1
Totals (4 entries)		2	2	2	6

== Final standing ==
=== Men ===
Rank	Team	Pld	W	D	L
1st place, gold medalist(s)	Japan	4	4	0	0
2nd place, silver medalist(s)	Kazakhstan	5	4	0	1
3rd place, bronze medalist(s)	South Korea	5	3	0	2
4	China	5	2	0	3
5	North Korea	3	2	0	1
6	United Arab Emirates	4	2	0	2
7	Kuwait	4	2	0	2
8	Malaysia	4	1	0	3
9	Thailand	4	2	0	2
10	Hong Kong	3	0	0	3
11	Macau	3	0	0	3

=== Women ===
Rank	Team	Pld	W	D	L
1st place, gold medalist(s)	Kazakhstan	4	4	0	0
2nd place, silver medalist(s)	Japan	4	3	0	1
3rd place, bronze medalist(s)	China	4	2	0	2
4	North Korea	4	1	0	3
5	South Korea	4	0	0	4
