= Ice hockey at the 2007 Asian Winter Games – Women's tournament =

Women at the 2007 Asian Winter Games
- Venue: Jilin Provincial Skating Rink
- Date: 28 January – 3 February 2007
- Competitors: 100 from 5 nations

Medalists
gold medal	Kazakhstan
silver medal	Japan
bronze medal	China

The women's tournament of Ice hockey at the 2007 Asian Winter Games at Changchun, China, was held from 28 January to 3 February 2007.

== Squads ==
China	Japan	Kazakhstan	North Korea
Huo Lina; Yu Baiwei; Su Ziwei; Li Xiuli; Fu Yue; Sang Hong; Zhang Ben; Huang Haijing; Jin Fengling; Ding Xiaolin; Sun Rui; Ma Rui; Cui Shanshan; Wang Linuo; Jiang Na; Tan Anqi; Zhang Jing; Wang Nan; Gao Fujin; Shi Yao; Qi Xueting; Zhang Shuang	Azusa Nakaoku; Haruna Kumano; Yoko Kondo; Emi Nonaka; Etsuko Wada; Tomoe Yamane; Ami Mashiko; Yuki Togawa; Yurie Adachi; Aki Fujii; Shoko Nihonyanagi; Yae Kawashima; Moemi Nakamura; Yuka Hirano; Tomoko Sakagami; Yoko Otani; Hanae Kubo; Chiaki Yamanaka; Kanae Aoki; Nana Fujimoto	Darya Obydennova; Xeniya Yelfimova; Alexandra Babushkina; Galina Shu; Lyubov Ibragimova; Olga Potapova; Tatyana Shtelmaister; Zarina Tukhtiyeva; Viktoriya Adiyeva; Larissa Sviridova; Yevgeniya Ivchenko; Olga Kryukova; Yekaterina Ryzhova; Viktoriya Sazonova; Albina Suprun; Tatyana Koroleva; Alena Fux; Vera Nazyrova; Svetlana Maltseva; Svetlana Vassina	Son Jong-sim; Tong Hye-song; Kim Hyang-ran; Ri Sol-gyong; O Chol-ok; Kwak Kum-sil; Kim Sok-hwa; Han Mi-song; Ri Yong-sun; Kim Sun-im; Kim In-hwa; Choe Kum-son; Jo Ok-hyon; Jong Kwang-hui; Hong Kum-sil; Ryu Hyon-mi; Kim Nong-gum; Yon Yong-sil; Ri Hye-yong
South Korea			
Kang Heun-sun; Yong Hwa-yeon; Lee Kyou-sun; Ko Hye-in; Lee Kyung-sun; Jung Eun-zoo; Han Jae-yeon; Ko Chea-ryung; Hong Young-joo; Ahn Kun-young; Yong Sun-hyoung; Son Mi-jeong; Lee Youn-young; Lee Min-ji; Kim Yu-mi; Kim Eun-jin; Lee Young-hwa; Lim Poo-rum; Shin So-jung			

== Results ==
All times are China Standard Time (UTC+08:00)

Pos	Team	Pld	W	D	L	GF	GA	GD	Pts
1	Kazakhstan	4	4	0	0	25	3	+22	12
2	Japan	4	3	0	1	37	6	+31	9
3	China	4	2	0	2	29	10	+19	6
4	North Korea	4	1	0	3	11	15	−4	3
5	South Korea	4	0	0	4	0	68	−68	0

Source: Official website

28 January; 12:30	North Korea	2–3 (1–2, 0–0, 1–1)	Japan	Jilin Provincial Skating Rink, Changchun; Attendance: 700

Hong Kum-sil
Goalies
Azusa Nakaoku
Referee:
Arina Ustinova (RUS)

Han – 02:56	1–0
	1–1	10:34 – Yamanaka (Kubo) (PP2)
	1–2	15:50 – Kubo (Hirano) (PP)
	1–3	49:49 – Wada
O (Ri Y.) (PP2) – 55:24	2–3

24 min
Penalties
8 min
12
Shots
20

28 January; 15:30	South Korea	0–20 (0–6, 0–7, 0–7)	China	Jilin Provincial Skating Rink, Changchun; Attendance: 1,200

Shin So-jung
Goalies
Huo Lina
Shi Yao
Referee:
Mary Anne Gage (CAN)

0–1	00:16 – Zhang B. (Zhang J.)
0–2	07:43 – Jin (Zhang J., Wang L.) (PP)
0–3	08:35 – Ma (Yu, Jin)
0–4	12:44 – Sang (Li, Su)
0–5	18:05 – Zhang B. (Fu, Sun)
0–6	18:28 – Sun (Zhang B., Zhang S.)
0–7	20:25 – Sun (Zhang J., Jin) (PP)
0–8	25:09 – Gao (Ding, Zhang J.) (PP)
0–9	29:03 – Sun (Wang L., Qi) (PP)
0–10	31:28 – Yu (Qi, Wang L.) (PP)
0–11	35:37 – Li (Zhang B., Zhang S.) (PP)
0–12	36:45 – Sang (Qi)
0–13	39:44 – Yu (Li, Su)
0–14	42:52 – Zhang B. (Fu, Sun) (SH)
0–15	45:07 – Li (Sang)
0–16	48:06 – Jiang (Wang L., Jin)
0–17	50:29 – Qi (Jin, Wang L.) (PP)
0–18	52:14 – Su (Fu, Zhang B.)
0–19	56:31 – Sun (Zhang J., Zhang S.)
0–20	59:41 – Jin (Sun, Wang L.)

20 min
Penalties
4 min
0
Shots
93

29 January; 15:00	Kazakhstan	6–1 (1–0, 5–1, 0–0)	North Korea	Jilin Provincial Skating Rink, Changchun; Attendance: 450

Darya Obydennova
Goalies
Hong Kum-sil
Ri Hye-yong
Referee:
Mamiko Utsumi (JPN)

Yelfimova (Nazyrova) (PP) – 19:41	1–0
Potapova (Tukhtiyeva) – 24:34	2–0
Sviridova (Ivchenko) – 26:33	3–0
Yelfimova – 31:17	4–0
Tukhtiyeva (Shu) (PP) – 33:49	5–0
Yelfimova (Shtelmaister) (PP) – 34:33	6–0
	6–1	36:31 – Ri S. (Jong)

6 min
Penalties
18 min
26
Shots
20

29 January; 19:00	Japan	29–0 (12–0, 6–0, 11–0)	South Korea	Jilin Provincial Skating Rink, Changchun; Attendance: 450

Nana Fujimoto
Goalies
Shin So-jung
Referee:
Mary Anne Gage (CAN)

Kumano (Togawa, Adachi) (PP) – 02:08	1–0
Mashiko (Yamane, Otani) (PP) – 05:03	2–0
Fujii (Kubo) – 05:14	3–0
Sakagami (Kawashima, Kondo) – 06:22	4–0
Nihonyanagi (Wada, Kumano) – 07:08	5–0
Kawashima (Hirano, Otani) – 09:11	6–0
Otani (Kawashima, Hirano) – 09:20	7–0
Kubo (Fujii, Yamanaka) – 10:52	8–0
Kawashima (Otani, Kondo) – 11:57	9–0
Nihonyanagi (Mashiko) – 13:00	10–0
Kubo (Fujii, Nonaka) – 14:19	11–0
Adachi (Nihonyanagi, Togawa) – 15:58	12–0
Fujii (Sakagami, Kubo) – 24:52	13–0
Adachi (Nakamura, Sakagami) – 27:21	14–0
Kawashima (Kondo, Mashiko) – 27:44	15–0
Hirano (Mashiko, Kawashima) – 32:37	16–0
Sakagami (Wada, Fujii) – 33:44	17–0
Togawa (Nihonyanagi, Otani) – 34:59	18–0
Sakagami (Kubo) – 40:24	19–0
Yamanaka (Kubo) – 42:33	20–0
Fujii (Kubo, Sakagami) – 43:26	21–0
Nihonyanagi (Otani, Kumano) – 44:16	22–0
Mashiko (Kawashima, Hirano) – 50:26	23–0
Fujii (Sakagami, Nonaka) (PP) – 51:39	24–0
Togawa (Otani, Nihonyanagi) – 52:04	25–0
Hirano (Kawashima, Mashiko) – 52:49	26–0
Wada (Nihonyanagi, Otani) (PP) – 54:50	27–0
Togawa (Yamanaka) (SH) – 57:18	28–0
Hirano (Wada, Kawashima) – 59:22	29–0

4 min
Penalties
14 min
107
Shots
2

31 January; 15:00	Kazakhstan	14–0 (5–0, 6–0, 3–0)	South Korea	Jilin Provincial Skating Rink, Changchun; Attendance: 1,200

Darya Obydennova
Goalies
Shin So-jung
Kim Yu-mi
Referee:
Mamiko Utsumi (JPN)

Ibragimova (Sazonova) – 00:27	1–0
Sviridova – 02:05	2–0
Potapova (Ibragimova, Tukhtiyeva) – 04:08	3–0
Nazyrova (Yelfimova, Sazonova) – 06:26	4–0
Ivchenko – 11:02	5–0
Ibragimova (Tukhtiyeva) – 25:21	6–0
Maltseva (Vassina) – 25:40	7–0
Ivchenko – 31:38	8–0
Koroleva – 35:11	9–0
Maltseva (Kryukova, Sazonova) – 36:14	10–0
Potapova (Ibragimova) (PP) – 38:54	11–0
Sviridova – 47:29	12–0
Koroleva (Sviridova, Shtelmaister) – 51:33	13–0
Nazyrova (Yelfimova) – 58:52	14–0

2 min
Penalties
2 min
85
Shots
0

31 January; 19:00	Japan	4–2 (1–0, 1–2, 2–0)	China	Jilin Provincial Skating Rink, Changchun; Attendance: 1,600

Azusa Nakaoku
Goalies
Huo Lina
Referee:
Arina Ustinova (RUS)

Kawashima (Kondo) (PP) – 12:01	1–0
	1–1	31:58 – Sang (Tan)
Yamanaka (Sakagami) – 35:55	2–1
	2–2	37:56 – Sun
Kondo (Wada) (PP) – 53:06	3–2
Kubo (Yamanaka, Sakagami) (SH) – 56:06	4–2

18 min
Penalties
22 min
23
Shots
21

1 February; 15:00	North Korea	5–0 (4–0, 1–0, 0–0)	South Korea	Jilin Provincial Skating Rink, Changchun; Attendance: 1,600

Ri Hye-yong
Goalies
Shin So-jung
Kim Yu-mi
Referee:
Arina Ustinova (RUS)

O (Choe) – 00:12	1–0
Kim S.H. (PP) – 03:16	2–0
Kim I. (Ri S.) – 04:53	3–0
Choe (Ri Y.) – 17:32	4–0
Kim N. (Ri S.) – 24:35	5–0

8 min
Penalties
6 min
30
Shots
3

2 February; 19:00	China	1–3 (1–1, 0–1, 0–1)	Kazakhstan	Jilin Provincial Skating Rink, Changchun; Attendance: 2,400

Huo Lina
Goalies
Darya Obydennova
Referee:
Mary Anne Gage (CAN)

Qi (Zhang J., Sun) (PP) – 06:06	1–0
	1–1	13:39 – Potapova (Tukhtiyeva, Ibragimova)
	1–2	29:12 – Babushkina (Vassina)
	1–3	46:57 – Potapova (Ibragimova) (PP)

8 min
Penalties
14 min
25
Shots
15

3 February; 15:00	Kazakhstan	2–1 (2–0, 0–1, 0–0)	Japan	Jilin Provincial Skating Rink, Changchun; Attendance: 1,800

Darya Obydennova
Goalies
Azusa Nakaoku
Referee:
Mary Anne Gage (CAN)

Shtelmaister (Nazyrova) – 09:19	1–0
Shtelmaister (Vassina, Babushkina) – 14:02	2–0
	2–1	32:37 – Kawashima (Mashiko, Hirano) (PP)

10 min
Penalties
8 min
13
Shots
18

3 February; 19:00	China	6–3 (1–0, 2–0, 3–3)	North Korea	Jilin Provincial Skating Rink, Changchun; Attendance: 2,200

Shi Yao
Goalies
Ri Hye-yong
Referee:
Mamiko Utsumi (JPN)

Qi (Wang L.) (PP2) – 13:48	1–0
Zhang J. (PP) – 23:46	2–0
Jin (Wang L.) – 29:07	3–0
Jin (Su, Wang L.) – 40:30	4–0
Sun (Zhang J.) – 42:33	5–0
	5–1	43:13 – Kim I.
	5–2	50:55 – O (PP)
Zhang B. (Fu) – 53:22	6–2
	6–3	58:28 – Choe

4 min
Penalties
14 min
26
Shots
21

== Final standing ==
Rank	Team	Pld	W	D	L
1st place, gold medalist(s)	Kazakhstan	4	4	0	0
2nd place, silver medalist(s)	Japan	4	3	0	1
3rd place, bronze medalist(s)	China	4	2	0	2
4	North Korea	4	1	0	3
5	South Korea	4	0	0	4
