= 2012 IIHF Women's World Championship Division I =

International ice hockey competition

Tournament details
- Host countries: Latvia; Great Britain
- Venues: 2 (in 2 host cities)
- Dates: 25–31 March 2012; 9–15 April 2012
- Teams: 12

The 2012 IIHF Women's World Championship Division I consisted of two international ice hockey tournaments organized by the International Ice Hockey Federation. Division I A and Division I B represent the second and third tier of the IIHF Women's World Championship.

In 2011, these tournaments were known as Division I and Division II.

== Division I Group A ==
2012 IIHF Women's World Championship Division I A
Tournament details
- Host country: Latvia
- City: Ventspils
- Venue: 1 (in 1 host city)
- Dates: 25–31 March 2012
- Teams: 6

Tournament statistics
- Matches played: 15
- Goals scored: 82 (5.47 per match)

The Division I Group A tournament was played in Ventspils, Latvia, from 25 to 31 March 2012. The winners, the Czech Republic, were promoted to the Top Division for 2013, while the bottom-ranked team, Kazakhstan, were relegated to Group B for 2013.

=== Participating teams ===
Team	Qualification
Kazakhstan	placed 8th in Top Division last year and were relegated
Norway	placed 2nd in Division I last year
Latvia	hosts; placed 3rd in Division I last year
Austria	placed 4th in Division I last year
Japan	didn't play last year, but retained their position in Division I
Czech Republic	placed 1st in Division II last year and were promoted

=== Final standings ===
Pos	Team	Pld	W	OTW	OTL	L	GF	GA	GD	Pts	Promotion or relegation
1	Czech Republic	5	4	0	0	1	19	8	+11	12	Promoted to the 2013 Top Division
2	Norway	5	3	1	0	1	20	7	+13	11	
3	Japan	5	3	0	0	2	15	10	+5	9	
4	Austria	5	2	0	0	3	16	18	−2	6	
5	Latvia (H)	5	1	1	0	3	5	20	−15	5	
6	Kazakhstan	5	0	0	2	3	7	19	−12	2	Relegated to the 2013 Division I B

Source: IIHF
(H) Host

=== Match results ===
All times are local (Eastern European Summer Time – UTC+3).

25 March 2012; 13:00	Austria	2–7 (1–2, 0–4, 1–1)	Norway	Olimpic Center Ice Hall; Attendance: 75

Game reference

Nina Geyer
Paula Marchhart
Goalies
Christine Smestad
Referee:
(United States) Erin Blair
Linesmen:
(Sweden) Evelina Eriksson
(Finland) Jonna Partanen

V. Hummel (J. Weber) (PP) – 11:20	1–0
	1–1	13:08 – H. Martinsen (H. Sletbak, T. Martens) (PP)
	1–2	13:27 – A. Dalen (M. Carlsson)
	1–3	26:06 – H. Ask (H. Martinsen)
	1–4	27:55 – I. Farstad (L. Oien)
	1–5	29:00 – H. Sletbak (H. Ask, H. Martinsen)
	1–6	32:22 – H. Martinsen (T. Martens, H. Ask)
C. Wittich – 42:38	2–6
	2–7	51:07 – I. Farstad (A. Dalen, M. Carlsson) (PP)

14 min
Penalties
30 min
19
Shots
35

25 March 2012; 16:30	Czech Republic	3–4 (1–4, 2–0, 0–0)	Japan	Olimpic Center Ice Hall; Attendance: 90

Game reference

Kateřina Bečevová
Radka Lhotská
Goalies
Azusa Nakaoku
Referee:
(Finland) Anu Hirvonen
Linesmen:
(France) Charlotte Girard
(Estonia) Kaire Leet

	0–1	04:05 – M. Shishiuchi (M. Fujimoto)
	0–2	05:05 – F. Ishiura (H. Yoneyama)
S. Nováková – 08:20	1–2
	1–3	10:06 – Y. Hirano
	1–4	10:56 – Ch. Osawa (H. Yoneyama, S. Suzuki)
L. Manhartová (B. Pekařová, S. Nováková) – 23:25	2–4
P. Horálková – 30:30	3–4

0 min
Penalties
8 min
39
Shots
27

25 March 2012; 20:00	Latvia	3–2 GWS (1–0, 1–2, 0–0) (OT: 0–0) (SO: 1–0)	Kazakhstan	Olimpic Center Ice Hall; Attendance: 282

Game reference

Lolita Andriševska
Goalies
Daria Obydennova
Referee:
(Russia) Arina Ustinova
Linesmen:
(Switzerland) Anne Ruth Kuonen
(Denmark) Malene Skovbakke

L. Dekmeijere-Trigubova (I. Koka) (PP2) – 07:30	1–0
	1–1	21:11 – N. Yakovchuk (A. Fux, Z. Tukhtieva)
	1–2	23:20 – V. Nazyrova
I. Bičevska (I. Pētersone) – 38:09	2–2

I. Bičevska (miss)
I. Koka
Shootout
(miss) A. Fux
(miss) G. Shu
(miss) Z. Tukhtieva
4 min
Penalties
12 min
26
Shots
29

26 March 2012; 13:00	Norway	1–2 (0–0, 1–1, 0–1)	Czech Republic	Olimpic Center Ice Hall; Attendance: 129

Game reference

Jorid Dagfinrud
Goalies
Radka Lhotská
Referee:
(Russia) Arina Ustinova
Linesmen:
(Russia) Darja Brusentseva
(Estonia) Kaire Leet

	0–1	27:11 – S. Nováková (L. Manhartová)
M. Carlsson (S. Holos) (PP) – 39:43	1–1
	1–2	53:02 – D. Křížová (A. Polenská, A. Tejralová) (PP)

26 min
Penalties
16 min
26
Shots
24

26 March 2012; 16:30	Kazakhstan	2–6 (1–2, 1–2, 0–2)	Austria	Olimpic Center Ice Hall; Attendance: 82

Game reference

Daria Obydennova
Goalies
Paula Marchhart
Referee:
(Netherlands) Debbie Hengst
Linesmen:
(Sweden) Evelina Eriksson
(Switzerland) Anne Ruth Kuonen

Z. Tukhtieva (N. Yakovchuk, V. Sazonova) (PP) – 01:38	1–0
	1–1	03:11 – J. Weber (V. Hummel, C. Wittich)
	1–2	12:56 – C. Wittich (D. Altmann, A. Meixner) (PP2)
	1–3	33:43 – D. Altmann (A. Meixner, C. Wittich)
G. Shu (T. Koroleva) – 34:42	2–3
	2–4	39:32 – A. Meixner (T. Grascher, S. Volgger)
	2–5	47:46 – E. Schwarzler (S. Ban, D. Altmann)
	2–6	54:46 – D. Altmann (E. Verworner)

14 min
Penalties
12 min
27
Shots
43

26 March 2012; 20:00	Japan	1–2 (0–0, 1–2, 0–0)	Latvia	Olimpic Center Ice Hall; Attendance: 235

Game reference

Shizuka Takahashi
Goalies
Lolita Andriševska
Referee:
(United States) Erin Blair
Linesmen:
(France) Charlotte Girard
(Finland) Jonna Partanen

	0–1	25:59 – I. Pētersone (I. Bičevska)
	0–2	26:07 – I. Koka (L. Aldina)
T. Sakagami (T. Homma, H. Kubo) (PP) – 37:58	1–2

10 min
Penalties
12 min
56
Shots
21

28 March 2012; 13:00	Japan	3–1 (2–0, 0–1, 1–0)	Austria	Olimpic Center Ice Hall; Attendance: 78

Game reference

Azusa Nakaoku
Goalies
Paula Marchhart
Referee:
(Finland) Anu Hirvonen
Linesmen:
(Russia) Darja Brusentseva
(Denmark) Malene Skovbakke

C. Osawa (H. Yoneyama, K. Aoki) – 17:29	1–0
S. Shimozawa (S. Suzuki, T. Sakagami) – 18:14	2–0
	2–1	30:29 – J. Weber (V. Hummel, A. Schneider)
H. Kubo (Y. Hirano, A. Nakamura) – 49:36	3–1

4 min
Penalties
4 min
40
Shots
34

28 March 2012; 16:30	Kazakhstan	1–2 OT: (0–0, 1–0, 0–1) (OT: 0–1)	Norway	Olimpic Center Ice Hall; Attendance: 63

Game reference

Daria Obydannova
Goalies
Jorid Dagfinrud
Referee:
(Russia) Arina Ustinova
Linesmen:
(France) Charlotte Girard
(Finland) Jonna Partanen

Z. Tukhtieva (O. Konysheva) (PP) – 30:12	1–0
	1–1	48:25 – T. Martens (H. Sletbak) (PP)
	1–2	61:05 – L. Oien (T. Martens)

8 min
Penalties
6 min
24
Shots
43

28 March 2012; 20:00	Czech Republic	5–0 (1–0, 1–0, 3–0)	Latvia	Olimpic Center Ice Hall; Attendance: 242

Game reference

Radka Lhotská
Goalies
Lolita Andriševska
Evija Tētiņa
Referee:
(Netherlands) Debby Hengst
Linesmen:
(Sweden) Evelina Eriksson
(Estonia) Kaire Leet

L. Povová (S. Studentová) – 06:41	1–0
S. Studentová (A. Tejralová, K. Flachsová) – 39:51	2–0
A. Polenská (S. Nováková, K. Flachsová) – 40:52	3–0
K. Chmelová (K. Kaplanová, B. Pekárková) – 41:41	4–0
D. Křížová (A. Polenská) – 50:28	5–0

18 min
Penalties
6 min
53
Shots
20

30 March 2012; 13:00	Kazakhstan	2–3 (0–1, 1–1, 1–1)	Czech Republic	Olimpic Center Ice Hall; Attendance: 50

Game reference

Daria Obydennova
Goalies
Radka Lhotská
Referee:
(United States) Erin Blair
Linesmen:
(Estonia) Kaire Leet
(Finland) Jonna Partanen

	0–1	03:28 – L. Povová (K. Chmelová, A. Kubatová)
	0–2	24:28 – L. Povová (K. Kaplanová)
O. Konysheva (V. Sazonova, V. Nazyrova) (PP2) – 39:27	1–2
	1–3	41:25 – A. Polenská (S. Nováková)
N. Yakovchuk (A. Fux) – 45:44	2–3

4 min
Penalties
10 min
39
Shots
20

30 March 2012; 16:30	Norway	4–2 (2–2, 0–0, 2–0)	Japan	Olimpic Center Ice Hall; Attendance: 64

Game reference

Jorid Dagfinrud
Goalies
Azusa Nakaoku
Referee:
(Netherlands) Debby Hengst
Linesmen:
(Sweden) Evelina Eriksson
(Denmark) Malene Skovbakke

	0–1	01:13 – A. Nakamura (T. Sakagami) (PP)
	0–2	04:52 – K. Aoki (C. Osawa, M. Shishiuchi) (PP)
L.B. Oien (A. Dalen, I. Farstad) – 07:00	1–2
A. Dalen (L.B. Oien) – 09:23	2–2
H. Sletbak (H. Martinsen, T. Martens) (PP) – 45:12	3–2
A. Dalen (L.B. Oien) – 49:19	4–2

8 min
Penalties
6 min
38
Shots
33

30 March 2012; 20:00	Latvia	0–6 (0–1, 0–2, 0–3)	Austria	Olimpic Center Ice Hall; Attendance: 270

Game reference

Lolita Andriševska
Evija Tētiņa
Goalies
Paula Marchhart
Referee:
(Finland) Anu Hirvonen
Linesmen:
(Russia) Darja Brusentseva
(Switzerland) Anne Ruth Kuonen

0–1	09:20 – J. Weber (E. Kantor)
0–2	27:50 – V. Hummel (E. Kantor, S. Hausberger) (PP)
0–3	38:36 – E. Schwarzler (E-M. Verworner)
0–4	40:31 – D. Altmann (E-M. Verworner)
0–5	43:57 – J. Weber
0–6	50:08 – D. Altmann (C. Wittich)

10 min
Penalties
6 min
33
Shots
35

31 March 2012; 13:00	Japan	5–0 (0–0, 2–0, 3–0)	Kazakhstan	Olimpic Center Ice Hall; Attendance: 55

Game reference

Azusa Nakaoku
Goalies
Daria Obydennova
Referee:
(Netherlands) Debby Hengst
Linesmen:
(France) Charlotte Girard
(Switzerland) Anne Ruth Kuonen

C. Osawa (A. Nakamura) – 22:58	1–0
S. Shimozawa (Y. Adachi, C. Osawa) – 31:32	2–0
H. Kubo (Y. Hirano, T. Sakagami) – 48:07	3–0
T. Homma (H. Kubo) (PP) – 52:54	4–0
K. Aoki (S. Suzuki, C. Osawa) (PP) – 58:30	5–0

6 min
Penalties
14 min
48
Shots
25

31 March 2012; 16:30	Norway	6–0 (2–0, 1–0, 3–0)	Latvia	Olimpic Center Ice Hall; Attendance: 243

Game reference

Jorid Dagfinrud
Goalies
Evija Tētiņa
Referee:
(Finland) Anu Hirvonen
Linesmen:
(Russia) Darja Brusentseva
(Denmark) Malene Skovbakke

L.B. Oien (I. Farstad, A. Dalen) – 02:29	1–0
M. Hansen – 13:52	2–0
H. Martinsen (M. Iversen, T. Martens) – 22:36	3–0
A. Dalen – 44:19	4–0
I. Farstad (L.B. Oien, A. Dalen) – 48:31	5–0
I. Farstad (A. Dalen, L.B. Oien) – 53:26	6–0

14 min
Penalties
2 min
47
Shots
12

31 March 2012; 20:00	Austria	1–6 (0–2, 0–2, 1–2)	Czech Republic	Olimpic Center Ice Hall; Attendance: 89

Game reference

Paula Marchhart
Goalies
Radka Lhotská
Referee:
(Netherlands) Debbie Hengst
Linesmen:
(Sweden) Evelina Eriksson
(Switzerland) Anne Ruth Kuonen

	0–1	17:28 – S. Nováková (K. Flachsová) (PP)
	0–2	18:29 – S. Studentová (E. Holešová)
	0–3	32:13 – L. Manhartová (B. Pekárková)
	0–4	35:13 – A. Polenská (S. Nováková, S. Studentová)
	0–5	44:05 – K. Chmelová (N. Tomigová, J. Fialová)
	0–6	46:36 – S. Studentová (P. Herzigová, L. Manhartová) (PP)
E. Schwarzler (D. Altmann) – 47:06	1–6

14 min
Penalties
12 min
27
Shots
43

=== Statistics and awards ===
==== Scoring leaders ====
Pos	Player	Country	GP	G	A	Pts	+/−	PIM
1	Andrea Dalen	Norway	5	4	5	9	+10	2
2	Line Bialik Øien	Norway	5	3	5	8	+9	10
3	Denise Altmann	Austria	5	4	3	7	+5	2
4	Sonja Nováková	Czech Republic	5	3	4	7	+5	2
5	Ingvild Farstad	Norway	5	4	2	6	+6	6
6	Helene Martinsen	Norway	5	3	3	6	+3	4
6	Chiho Osawa	Japan	5	3	3	6	+3	0
8	Trine Martens	Norway	5	1	5	6	+5	0
9	Janine Weber	Austria	5	4	1	5	–3	0
10	Alena Polenská	Czech Republic	5	3	2	5	+2	2
10	Simona Studentová	Czech Republic	5	3	2	5	+4	4

GP = Games played; G = Goals; A = Assists; Pts = Points; +/− = Plus–minus; PIM = Penalties In Minutes

Source: IIHF.com

==== Goaltending leaders ====
(minimum 40% team's total ice time)

Pos	Player	Country	TOI	GA	GAA	Sv%	SO
1	Radka Lhotská	Czech Republic	288:36	4	0.83	96.15	1
2	Jorid Dagfinrud	Norway	241:05	5	1.24	94.62	1
3	Azusa Nakaoku	Japan	239:51	8	2.00	94.12	0
4	Paula Marchhart	Austria	266:15	12	2.70	92.90	0
5	Lolita Andriševska	Latvia	211:33	12	3.40	92.59	0

TOI = Time on ice (minutes:seconds); GA = Goals against; GAA = Goals against average; Sv% = Save percentage; SO = Shutouts

Source: IIHF.com

==== Directorate Awards ====
- Goaltender: Radka Lhotská, Czech Republic
- Defenseman: Trine Martens, Norway
- Forward: Denise Altmann, Austria

Source: IIHF.com

== Division I Group B ==
2012 IIHF Women's World Championship Division I B
Tournament details
- Host country: Great Britain
- City: Hull
- Venue: 1 (in 1 host city)
- Dates: 9–15 April 2012
- Teams: 6

Tournament statistics
- Matches played: 15
- Goals scored: 96 (6.4 per match)

The Division I Group B tournament was played in Hull, Great Britain, from 9 to 15 April 2012. The winners, Denmark, moved up to Group A for 2013, while the last-placed team, Italy, were relegated to Division II Group A. Denmark won the three way tie-breaker with France and China by virtue of having a superior goal differential in the games those three nations played against each other (Denmark +3, China +1, France −4). Relegation was decided in similar fashion, by breaking a three way tie between Great Britain (+4), the Netherlands (−1), and Italy (−3).

=== Participating teams ===
Team	Qualification
China	placed 5th in Division I last year and were relegated
France	placed 2nd in Division II last year
Denmark	placed 3rd in Division II last year
Italy	placed 4th in Division II last year
Great Britain	hosts; placed 5th in Division II last year
Netherlands	placed 1st in Division III last year and were promoted

=== Final standings ===
Pos	Team	Pld	W	OTW	OTL	L	GF	GA	GD	Pts	Promotion or relegation
1	Denmark	5	4	0	0	1	31	6	+25	12	Promoted to the 2013 Division I A
2	China	5	4	0	0	1	21	8	+13	12	
3	France	5	4	0	0	1	22	9	+13	12	
4	Great Britain (H)	5	1	0	0	4	10	17	−7	3	
5	Netherlands	5	1	0	0	4	7	34	−27	3	
6	Italy	5	1	0	0	4	5	22	−17	3	Relegated to the 2013 Division II A

Source: IIHF
(H) Host

=== Match results ===
All times are local (Western European Summer Time – UTC+1).

9 April 2012; 13:00	Italy	0–4 (0–2, 0–1, 0–1)	France	Hull Arena; Attendance: 150

Game reference

Giulia Mazzocchi
Goalies
Caroline Baldin
Referee:
(Czech Republic) Radka Ruzickova
Linesmen:
(United Kingdom) Leigh Hetherington
(Czech Republic) Ilona Novotna

0–1	01:15 – L. Baudrit
0–2	05:06 – B. Jouanny (A. Viane) (PP)
0–3	22:36 – A. Bouche (Amandine Cuasnet)
0–4	54:48 – L. Baudrit (V. Bouetz-Andrieu) (PP2)

20 min
Penalties
8 min
11
Shots
42

9 April 2012; 16:30	Netherlands	1–7 (0–3, 1–2, 0–2)	China	Hull Arena; Attendance: 200

Game reference

Claudia van Leeuwen
Goalies
Shi Yao
Referee:
(Japan) Mamiko Utsumi
Linesmen:
(United Kingdom) Amy Lack
(Switzerland) Evelyn Loretan

	0–1	04:20 – Jin F.
	0–2	10:36 – Sun R. (Jin F.)
	0–3	10:54 – Kong M. (Zhang M.)
	0–4	27:35 – Liu Zhixin (Ma R.)
	0–5	30:51 – Jin F. (Huang H.)
J. Zwarthoed (M. de Jong) (PP) – 34:05	1–5
	1–6	42:48 – Jin F. (Qi X., Zhang S.) (PP)
	1–7	43:36 – Liu Z. (Yu B.)

16 min
Penalties
12 min
10
Shots
71

9 April 2012; 20:00	Great Britain	2–5 (1–0, 1–0, 0–5)	Denmark	Hull Arena; Attendance: 550

Game reference

Nicole Jackson
Goalies
Kamilla Lund Nielsen
Referee:
(Germany) Katja Bandlofsky
Linesmen:
(United States) Andrea Weissman
(Canada) Haley Wieler

N. Aldridge – 17:04	1–0
A. Taylor – 35:53	2–0
	2–1	41:27 – N. Jensen
	2–2	46:31 – M. Henriksen (J. Jakobsen, H. Ostergaard) (PP)
	2–3	54:35 – H. Ostergaard (M. Henriksen)
	2–4	56:22 – M. Henriksen (M. Olausson, H. Ostergaard) (PP)
	2–5	58:46 – M. Henriksen (J. Asperup, J. Jakobsen) (PP)

28 min
Penalties
20 min
14
Shots
61

10 April 2012; 13:00	Denmark	12–0 (4–0, 2–0, 6–0)	Netherlands	Hull Arena; Attendance: 81

Game reference

Kamilla Lund Nielsen
Amalie Joa
Goalies
Claudia van Leeuwen
Referee:
(Japan) Mamiko Utsumi
Linesmen:
(Switzerland) Evelyn Loretan
(Canada) Haley Wieler

J. Jakobsen (H. Ostergaard) (PP2) – 03:46	1–0
H. Ostergaard (J. Jakobsen, J. Asperup) – 05:23	2–0
N. Jensen (J. Gregersen) – 09:44	3–0
H. Ostergaard (M. Henriksen) – 11:39	4–0
J. Jakobsen (J. Asperup) (PP) – 24:42	5–0
M. Henriksen (H. Ostergaard, J. Jakobsen) (PP) – 33:27	6–0
J. Persson (SH) – 41:52	7–0
J. Persson – 45:04	8–0
C. Andersen (S. Jacquet) – 51:42	9–0
H. Ostergaard (J. Gregersen, J. Asperup) – 53:08	10–0
J. Gregersen (M. Henriksen, H. Ostergaard) – 53:38	11–0
E. Russell (S. Jacquet) (PP2) – 57:46	12–0

10 min
Penalties
24 min
70
Shots
16

10 April 2012; 16:30	China	4–1 (1–1, 1–0, 2–0)	Italy	Hull Arena; Attendance: 201

Game reference

Shi Yao
Goalies
Giulia Mazzocchi
Referee:
(Czech Republic) Radka Ruzickova
Linesmen:
(United Kingdom) Leigh Hetherington
(Japan) Mamiko Utsumi

	0–1	08:31 – A. Tartaglione (B. Larger, D. da Rugna)
Sun R. (PP) – 12:42	1–1
Gao F. (Ma R., Yu B.) (PP) – 30:04	2–1
Huang H. – 44:15	3–1
Jin F. (Qi X.) – 46:07	4–1

6 min
Penalties
24 min
34
Shots
27

10 April 2012; 20:00	France	5–0 (1–0, 1–0, 3–0)	Great Britain	Hull Arena; Attendance: 201

Game reference

Carolin Baldin
Mathilde Bopp
Goalies
Nicole Jackson
Referee:
(Canada) Gabrielle Ariano-Lortie
Linesmen:
(Japan) Hitomi Igarashi
(Czech Republic) Ilona Novotna

V. Bouetz–Andrieu (M. Goncalves) – 01:52	1–0
A. Bouche (B. Jouanny) – 27:21	2–0
C. Gandit (E. Passard, V. V. Bouetz–Andrieu) – 42:22	3–0
A. Locatelli – 47:09	4–0
E. Passard – 57:05	5–0

10 min
Penalties
18 min
37
Shots
11

12 April 2012; 13:00	Netherlands	5–0 (0–0, 5–0, 0–0)	Italy	Hull Arena; Attendance: 150

Game reference

Claudia van Leeuwen
Goalies
Giulia Mazzocchi
Rita Flor
Referee:
(Canada) Gabrielle Ariano-Lortie
Linesmen:
(Japan) Hitomi Igarashi
(Czech Republic) Ilona Novotna

S. Wielenga (M. de Jong) – 23:01	1–0
M. de Jong (S. Wielenga) – 23:14	2–0
M. de Jong (S. Wielenga) (SH) – 26:39	3–0
E. Even (C. Keijzer) – 30:10	4–0
S. Wielenga (M. de Jong, M. Martens) – 34:46	5–0

20 min
Penalties
22 min
27
Shots
51

12 April 2012; 16:30	France	0–5 (0–1, 0–0, 0–4)	Denmark	Hull Arena; Attendance: 151

Game reference

Caroline Baldin
Goalies
Kamilla Lund Nielsen
Referee:
(Germany) Katja Bandlofsky
Linesmen:
(United Kingdom) Leigh Hetherington
(United Kingdom) Amy Lack

0–1	03:11 – H. Ostergaard (C. Densing, M. Henriksen) (SH)
0–2	43:09 – M. Olausson (N. Jensen, J. Persson) (PP)
0–3	44:56 – M. Henriksen (J. Asperup, S. Jacquet) (PP)
0–4	52:27 – J. Jakobsen (SH)
0–5	56:37 – J. Jakobsen (M. Henriksen, H. Ostergaard)

14 min
Penalties
10 min
21
Shots
39

12 April 2012; 20:00	China	3–0 (0–0, 2–0, 1–0)	Great Britain	Hull Arena; Attendance: 501

Game reference

Shi Yao
Goalies
Samantha Bolwell
Referee:
(Japan) Mamiko Utsumi
Linesmen:
(Switzerland) Evelyn Loretan
(United States) Andrea Weissman

Zhang B. (Gao F.) (PP) – 22:29	1–0
Sun R. (Huang H.) – 30:16	2–0
Sun R. – 48:06	3–0

12 min
Penalties
8 min
30
Shots
17

14 April 2012; 13:00	Denmark	2–4 (1–0, 1–2, 0–2)	China	Hull Arena; Attendance: 151

Game reference

Kamilla Lund Nielsen
Goalies
Shi Yao
Referee:
(Czech Republic) Radka Ruzickova
Linesmen:
(Japan) Hitomi Igarashi
(United Kingdom) Amy Lack

H. Ostergaard (J. Jakobsen, Marie Henriksen (ice hockey)) – 00:38	1–0
J. Persson (M. Frandsen) (PP) – 21:38	2–0
	2–1	30:43 – Ma R. (Zhang B.)
	2–2	31:23 – Sun R.
	2–3	53:10 – Zhang M.
	2–4	54:06 – Sun R. (Yu B.) (SH)

10 min
Penalties
12 min
31
Shots
20

14 April 2012; 16:30	France	9–1 (2–1, 3–0, 4–0)	Netherlands	Hull Arena; Attendance: 180

Game reference

Caroline Baldin
Mathilde Bopp
Goalies
Claudia van Leeuwen
Referee:
(Germany) Katja Bandlofsky
Linesmen:
(United Kingdom) Leigh Hetherington
(Switzerland) Evelyn Loretan

M. Allemoz (M. Ravillard) – 05:52	1–0
E. Passard (D. Gicquel) – 06:45	2–0
	2–1	09:41 – S. Wielenga (J. Tegelaar)
E. Passard (D. Gicquel) – 26:39	3–1
A. Locatelli (A. Bouche, A. Cuasnet) – 33:22	4–1
E. Passard (PP) – 39:26	5–1
M. Allemoz (M. Goncalves, V. Bouetz Andrieu) – 40:29	6–1
M. Allemoz (V. Bouetz Andrieu) (PP) – 53:14	7–1
C. Gandit (A. Bouche) – 54:09	8–1
A. Bouche (D. Gicquel, A. Viard) – 58:15	9–1

6 min
Penalties
32 min
53
Shots
14

14 April 2012; 20:00	Italy	4–2 (2–1, 2–1, 0–0)	Great Britain	Hull Arena; Attendance: 501

Game reference

Giulia Mazzocchi
Goalies
Nicole Jackson
Samantha Bolwell
Referee:
(Canada) Gabrielle Ariano-Lortie
Linesmen:
(Czech Republic) Ilona Novotna
(Canada) Haley Wieler

	0–1	13:27 – K. Henry (E. Turner, C. Newman)
B. Larger (L. de Rocco, D. da Rugna) – 14:36	1–1
B. Larger (E. Dalpra) (PP) – 18:34	2–1
B. Larger (D. da Rugna, S. Gius) – 21:18	3–1
B. Larger (L. de Rocco, V. Bettarini) (PP2) – 23:39	4–1
	4–2	38:29 – K. Henry (S. Allen (PP))

20 min
Penalties
16 min
33
Shots
33

15 April 2012; 13:00	China	3–4 (2–2, 0–0, 1–2)	France	Hull Arena; Attendance: 152

Game reference

Shi Yao
Goalies
Caroline Baldin
Referee:
(Canada) Gabrielle Ariano-Lortie
Linesmen:
(United States) Andrea Weissman
(Canada) Haley Wieler

	0–1	02:07 – S. Fohrer
	0–2	15:34 – M. Allemoz (M. Goncalves, M. Ravillard)
Ma R. (Gao F.) – 16:18	1–2
Sun R. (Qi X., Jin F.) (PP) – 18:59	2–2
	2–3	40:23 – A. Locatelli (M. Ravillard)
	2–4	50:04 – B. Jouanny (E. Passard, D. Gicquel)
Qi X. (Huang H.) – 53:09	3–4

8 min
Penalties
8 min
26
Shots
27

15 April 2012; 16:30	Denmark	7–0 (1–0, 5–0, 1–0)	Italy	Hull Arena; Attendance: 251

Game reference

Kamilla Lund Nielsen
Amalie Joa
Goalies
Giulia Mazzocchi
Rita Flor
Referee:
(Germany) Katja Bandlofsky
Linesmen:
(United Kingdom) Amy Lack
(Czech Republic) Ilona Novotna

J. Jakobsen (M. Henriksen, J. Asperup) – 15:48	1–0
J. Jakobsen (M. Olausson, H. Ostergaard) (PP2) – 22:59	2–0
L. Ernst (M. Henriksen) (PP) – 25:24	3–0
H. Ostergaard (J. Jakobsen, J. Asperup) – 28:21	4–0
J. Jakobsen (H. Ostergaard, J. Asperup) – 35:11	5–0
L. Ernst (M. Olausson) – 39:06	6–0
N. Jensen (J. Persson, J. Gregersen) (PP) – 43:56	7–0

12 min
Penalties
24 min
35
Shots
26

15 April 2012; 20:00	Great Britain	6–0 (3–0, 1–0, 2–0)	Netherlands	Hull Arena; Attendance: 501

Game reference

Samantha Bolwell
Goalies
Claudia van Leeuwen
Referee:
(Japan) Mamiko Utsumi
Linesmen:
(Japan) Hitomi Igarashi
(Switzerland) Evelyn Loretan

A. Taylor (G. Farman, A. Carr) – 03:45	1–0
E. Turner (A. Taylor) (PP) – 11:48	2–0
K. Henry (A. Lamb, S. Allen) (PP) – 18:47	3–0
K. Henry (PP) – 28:01	4–0
N. Aldridge (G. Farman, L. Adams) (PP) – 41:54	5–0
K. Gale (S. Ledger) – 45:31	6–0

8 min
Penalties
18 min
39
Shots
22

=== Statistics and awards ===
==== Scoring leaders ====
Pos	Player	Country	GP	G	A	Pts	+/−	PIM
1	Henriette Ostergaard	Denmark	5	7	8	15	+8	10
2	Josefine Jakobsen	Denmark	5	7	6	13	+6	2
3	Marie Henriksen	Denmark	5	5	8	13	+7	0
4	Josephine Asperup	Denmark	5	0	8	8	+7	8
5	Sun Rui	China	5	7	0	7	+10	0
6	Jin Fengling	China	5	4	2	6	+7	6
6	Emmanuelle Passard	France	5	4	2	6	+5	0
8	Virginie Bouetz-Andrieu	France	5	1	5	6	+7	2
9	Beatrix Larger	Italy	5	4	1	5	–3	4
10	Anouck Bouche	France	5	3	2	5	+7	4
10	Josefine Persson	Denmark	5	3	2	5	+5	12
10	Savine Wielenga	Netherlands	5	3	2	5	–4	6

GP = Games played; G = Goals; A = Assists; Pts = Points; +/− = Plus–minus; PIM = Penalties In Minutes

Source: IIHF.com

==== Goaltending leaders ====
(minimum 40% team's total ice time)

Pos	Player	Country	TOI	GA	GAA	Sv%	SO
1	Samantha Bolwell	Great Britain	134:21	3	1.34	95.59	1
2	Kamilla Nielsen	Denmark	278:36	6	1.29	93.02	2
3	Shi Yao	China	291:00	8	1.65	92.86	1
4	Caroline Baldin	France	267:09	9	2.02	90.72	1
5	Claudia van Leeuwen	Netherlands	295:54	33	6.69	88.21	1

TOI = Time on ice (minutes:seconds); GA = Goals against; GAA = Goals against average; Sv% = Save percentage; SO = Shutouts

Source: IIHF.com

==== Directorate Awards ====
- Goaltender: Shi Yao, China
- Defenseman: Charlotte Densing, Denmark
- Forward: Sun Rui, China

Source: IIHF.com
