= Ice hockey at the 2011 Asian Winter Games – Women's tournament =

Women at the 2011 Asian Winter Games
- Venue: Baluan Sholak Sports Palace
- Date: 28 January – 3 February 2011
- Competitors: 102 from 5 nations

Medalists
gold medal	Kazakhstan
silver medal	Japan
bronze medal	China

The women's tournament of Ice hockey at the 2011 Asian Winter Games at Almaty, Kazakhstan, was held from 28 January to 3 February 2011.

Kazakhstan won the gold medal in a round robin competition.

== Squads ==
China	Japan	Kazakhstan	North Korea
Han Danni; Yu Baiwei; Kong Minghui; Lou Yue; Liu Zhixin; Zhang Mengying; Wang Nan; Zhang Ben; Huang Haijing; Jin Fengling; Sun Rui; Ma Rui; Cui Shanshan; Jiang Na; Huo Cui; Fang Xin; Tang Liang; Gao Fujin; Shi Yao; Qi Xueting; Zhang Shuang	Azusa Nakaoku; Shiori Koike; Yoko Kondo; Nachi Fujimoto; Kanae Aoki; Sena Suzuki; Mika Hori; Tomoe Yamane; Mai Morii; Haruna Yoneyama; Yurie Adachi; Chiho Osawa; Moeko Fujimoto; Tomo Eguchi; Saki Shimozawa; Yuka Hirano; Tomoko Sakagami; Shizuka Takahashi; Miho Shishiuchi; Ami Nakamura; Nodoka Abe	Aizhan Raushanova; Galina Shu; Lyubov Ibragimova; Olga Potapova; Yelena Shtelmaister; Zarina Tukhtiyeva; Viktoriya Mussatayeva; Larissa Sviridova; Galiya Nurgaliyeva; Olga Konysheva; Olga Kryukova; Natalya Yakovchuk; Darya Obydennova; Viktoriya Sazonova; Tatyana Koroleva; Albina Suprun; Anna Kossenko; Alena Fux; Mariya Topkayeva; Alexandra Ashikhina; Natalya Trunova; Anastassiya Orlova	Kim Un-ae; Hong Ji-hyang; Ro Sun-bok; Ryu Hyon-mi; Ri Sol-gyong; Ri Yong-sun; Ri Un-hyang; Han Song-hui; O Chol-ok; To Hyang-mi; Kim Sok-hwa; Kim In-hwa; Choe Jong-hui; Jin Ok; Ri Ok-yong; Hong Kum-sil; Kim Nong-gum; Won Chol-sun; Kim Kum-bok; Ri Hye-yong
South Korea			
Han Do-hee; Hwangbo Young; Han Soo-jin; Park Da-yun; Yong Hwa-yeon; Lee Kyou-sun; Ko Hye-in; Han Jae-yeon; Ko Chea-ryung; Hong Young-joo; Ahn Kun-young; Jo Kyoo-young; Choi Bo-young; Lee Min-ji; Lee Yeon-jeong; Kim Eun-jin; Lee Young-hwa; Shin So-jung			

== Results ==
All times are Almaty Time (UTC+06:00)

Pos	Team	Pld	W	OW	OL	L	GF	GA	GD	Pts
1	Kazakhstan	4	3	1	0	0	21	3	+18	11
2	Japan	4	2	1	1	0	22	6	+16	9
3	China	4	2	0	1	1	22	9	+13	7
4	North Korea	4	1	0	0	3	7	18	−11	3
5	South Korea	4	0	0	0	4	1	37	−36	0

Source: IIHF

28 January; 14:30	South Korea	0–10 (0–4, 0–3, 0–3)	Japan	Baluan Sholak Sports Palace, Almaty; Attendance: 1,500

Game reference

Shin So-jung
Goalies
Azusa Nakaoku
Shizuka Takahashi
Referee:
Arina Ustinova (RUS)

0–1	01:32 – Nakamura (Adachi)
0–2	16:17 – Shimozawa (Hirano, Aoki) (PP)
0–3	18:14 – Eguchi (Yoneyama)
0–4	18:46 – Hirano (Sakagami)
0–5	29:21 – Fujimoto (Yoneyama)
0–6	37:15 – Yoneyama (Koike, Shishiuchi)
0–7	39:59 – Sakagami (Hirano, Shimozawa)
0–8	40:40 – Shishiuchi (Fujimoto, Yoneyama)
0–9	43:40 – Aoki (Hirano) (PP)
0–10	53:59 – Fujimoto (Yamane) (PP)

18 min
Penalties
4 min
4
Shots
86

28 January; 19:00	North Korea	0–3 (0–1, 0–0, 0–2)	Kazakhstan	Baluan Sholak Sports Palace, Almaty; Attendance: 2,500

Game reference

Hong Kum-sil
Ri Hye-yong
Goalies
Darya Obydennova
Referee:
Kotoe Umemura (JPN)

0–1	07:56 – Yakovchuk (Sazonova, Shu) (PP)
0–2	42:51 – Konysheva (Sviridova)
0–3	52:40 – Tukhtiyeva (Potapova)

4 min
Penalties
8 min
17
Shots
50

29 January; 14:30	China	8–1 (1–1, 4–0, 3–0)	North Korea	Baluan Sholak Sports Palace, Almaty; Attendance: 500

Game reference

Shi Yao
Goalies
Ri Hye-yong
Hong Kum-sil
Referee:
Erin Blair (USA)

Ma (Tang) – 11:07	1–0
	1–1	15:18 – Kim N. (Ri S.) (PP)
Qi (Jin) (PP) – 25:06	2–1
Sun (Zhang B.) – 25:18	3–1
Jin (Qi) (PP) – 35:24	4–1
Qi (Sun, Zhang S.) (PP) – 36:45	5–1
Ma – 46:39	6–1
Ma – 50:02	7–1
Zhang B. (Jin, Sun) – 57:40	8–1

4 min
Penalties
6 min
51
Shots
15

29 January; 19:00	Kazakhstan	11–0 (2–0, 5–0, 4–0)	South Korea	Baluan Sholak Sports Palace, Almaty; Attendance: 2,400

Game reference

Darya Obydennova
Aizhan Raushanova
Goalies
Shin So-jung
Referee:
Kotoe Umemura (JPN)

Yakovchuk (Fux) – 03:54	1–0
Fux (Shtelmaister, Yakovchuk) – 12:11	2–0
Fux (Yakovchuk, Shu) – 22:39	3–0
Tukhtiyeva (Shtelmaister, Sviridova) – 30:15	4–0
Tukhtiyeva (Sviridova) – 34:53	5–0
Yakovchuk (Shtelmaister) – 36:30	6–0
Tukhtiyeva (Potapova, Shu) – 37:21	7–0
Tukhtiyeva (Potapova, Shtelmaister) (PP) – 45:09	8–0
Shtelmaister (Mussatayeva, Ibragimova) (PP) – 52:23	9–0
Shtelmaister (Yakovchuk, Fux) – 54:43	10–0
Yakovchuk (Ibragimova) – 56:19	11–0

8 min
Penalties
8 min
101
Shots
4

31 January; 14:30	China	10–0 (1–0, 5–0, 4–0)	South Korea	Baluan Sholak Sports Palace, Almaty; Attendance: 700

Game reference

Shi Yao
Goalies
Shin So-jung
Referee:
Arina Ustinova (RUS)

Sun (Jin, Zhang B.) – 16:36	1–0
Sun (Huo) – 20:55	2–0
Sun (Qi) – 23:05	3–0
Qi (Sun) – 23:29	4–0
Sun (Jin) – 29:42	5–0
Tang – 35:22	6–0
Sun (Jin) – 46:21	7–0
Zhang B. (Jin) (PP) – 51:44	8–0
Tang (Fang, Liu) (PP) – 54:38	9–0
Qi (Sun) (SH) – 58:29	10–0

6 min
Penalties
8 min
78
Shots
2

31 January; 19:00	Kazakhstan	3–2 GWS (0–1, 0–1, 2–0) (OT: 0–0) (SO: 1–0)	Japan	Baluan Sholak Sports Palace, Almaty; Attendance: 3,300

Game reference

Darya Obydennova
Goalies
Azusa Nakaoku
Referee:
Erin Blair (USA)

	0–1	19:24 – Kondo (Nakamura, Adachi) (PP)
	0–2	24:26 – Aoki (PP)
Sviridova (Mussatayeva) (PP) – 52:47	1–2
Tukhtiyeva (SH) – 55:41	2–2

Shu (miss)
Tukhtiyeva
Potapova (miss)
Shootout
(miss) Adachi
(miss) Osawa
(miss) Hirano
10 min
Penalties
10 min
36
Shots
29

1 February; 14:30	North Korea	6–1 (2–1, 2–0, 2–0)	South Korea	Baluan Sholak Sports Palace, Almaty; Attendance: 551

Game reference

Hong Kum-sil
Goalies
Shin So-jung
Referee:
Kotoe Umemura (JPN)

O (Kim S., Kim N.) – 08:24	1–0
	1–1	09:57 – Lee K. (Hwango) (PP)
Ri Y. (Ri S.) (PP) – 11:20	2–1
Won (Kim S.) – 27:28	3–1
O (Ri Y.) – 37:10	4–1
Ro (Kim K., Ri S.) – 48:11	5–1
Ryu (Ri S.) – 52:17	6–1

6 min
Penalties
2 min
70
Shots
14

1 February; 19:00	Japan	4–3 OT (0–0, 2–1, 1–2) (OT: 1–0)	China	Baluan Sholak Sports Palace, Almaty; Attendance: 2,000

Game reference

Azusa Nakaoku
Goalies
Shi Yao
Referee:
Arina Ustinova (RUS)

	0–1	26:03 – Qi (SH)
Sakagami (Aoki) (PP2) – 30:32	1–1
Sakagami (Koike, Aoki) (PP) – 37:43	2–1
	2–2	44:00 – Zhang M. (Qi)
	2–3	48:24 – Jin (Sun) (PP)
Osawa (Yoneyama) – 57:31	3–3
Sakagami (Kondo, Yamane) – 64:36	4–3

8 min
Penalties
18 min
40
Shots
26

3 February; 11:30	Japan	6–0 (2–0, 3–0, 1–0)	North Korea	Baluan Sholak Sports Palace, Almaty; Attendance: 500

Game reference

Azusa Nakaoku
Shizuka Takahashi
Goalies
Hong Kum-sil
Ri Hye-yong
Referee:
Arina Ustinova (RUS)

Hirano (Aoki) (PP) – 08:58	1–0
Shimozawa (Hirano) (PP) – 15:37	2–0
Yoneyama – 20:46	3–0
Kondo (Yoneyama) – 26:18	4–0
Hirano (Adachi) – 26:34	5–0
Sakagami – 55:42	6–0

10 min
Penalties
8 min
39
Shots
21

3 February; 16:00	China	1–4 (0–1, 0–1, 1–2)	Kazakhstan	Baluan Sholak Sports Palace, Almaty; Attendance: 3,700

Game reference

Shi Yao
Goalies
Darya Obydennova
Referee:
Erin Blair (USA)

	0–1	12:20 – Shtelmaister (Ibragimova, Fux)
	0–2	37:40 – Tukhtiyeva (Sazonova)
	0–3	43:11 – Shtelmaister
Ma (Jin, Qi) (PP) – 57:58	1–3
	1–4	59:14 – Ibragimova (Koroleva) (EN)

4 min
Penalties
6 min
26
Shots
33

== Final standing ==
Rank	Team	Pld	W	OW	OL	L
1st place, gold medalist(s)	Kazakhstan	4	3	1	0	0
2nd place, silver medalist(s)	Japan	4	2	1	1	0
3rd place, bronze medalist(s)	China	4	2	0	1	1
4	North Korea	4	1	0	0	3
5	South Korea	4	0	0	0	4
