= 2011 IIHF Women's Challenge Cup of Asia =

Tournament details
- Host country: Japan
- Venue: 1 (in 1 host city)
- Dates: November 11–14, 2010
- Teams: 3

Final positions
- Champions: Japan (1st title)

Tournament statistics
- Games played: 4
- Goals scored: 26 (6.5 per game)
- Attendance: 605 (151 per game)
- Scoring leader: (Japan) Yurie Adachi

The 2011 IIHF Women's Challenge Cup of Asia was the 2nd Women's IIHF Challenge Cup of Asia, an annual international ice hockey tournament. It took place between 11 November, 14 November 2010 in Japan. The games were played in the Kirifuri Arena, Nikko. The Chinese team was the defending champion, having won the 2010 championship.

The tournament was won by Japan, who claimed the first title by defeating China 3–1 in the final. Japan's Yurie Adachi and Azusa Nakaoku were the tournament's leading scorer and goaltender in save percentage respectively.

== Standings ==
Team	Pld	W	OTW	OTL	L	GF	GA	GD	Pts
Japan	2	1	0	1	0	13	2	+11	4
China	2	1	1	0	0	9	1	+8	5
South Korea	2	0	0	0	2	0	19	−19	0

== Fixtures ==
All times local.

November 11, 2010; 18:00	Japan	12 – 0 (5–0, 6–0, 1–0)	South Korea	Kirifuri Arena; Attendance: 110

Game reference

Azusa Nakaoku
Shizuka Takahashi
Goalies
Shin So-jung
Referee:
(Japan) Miyuki Nakayama

Shimozawa (Hirano) - 00:28	1 – 0
Nakamura (Adachi) - 04:49	2 – 0
Eguchi - 06:02	3 – 0
Sakagami (Hirano, Shimozawa) - 16:43	4 – 0
Osawa (Adachi) - 17:27	5 – 0
Shimozawa (Sakagami) - 20:27	6 – 0
Hirano (Sakagami) - 22:56	7 – 0
Adachi (Nakamura, Osawa) - 29:12	8 – 0
Hirano (Hori) - 31:41	9 – 0
Terashima (Eguchi) - 33:46	10 – 0
Shimozawa (Sakagami, Hirano) (PP) - 38:39	11 – 0
Adachi (Nakamura) - 49:27	12 – 0

35 min
Penalties
4 min
96
Shots
5

November 12, 2010; 18:00	China	7 – 0 (2–0, 1–0, 4–0)	South Korea	Kirifuri Arena; Attendance: 55

Game reference

Han Danni
Goalies
Shin So-jung
Referee:
(Japan) Kyoko Ugajin

Sun (Zhang, B.) - 12:39	1 – 0
Gao (Ma, Huang) - 16:38	2 – 0
Zhang, M. (Kong) - 39:00	3 – 0
Zhang, S. (Qi) - 43:29	4 – 0
Zhang, B. (Zhang, S., Tang) (PP) - 48:39	5 – 0
Tang (Qi) - 52:57	6 – 0
Gao (Ma, Yu) - 59:19	7 – 0

10 min
Penalties
14 min
93
Shots
4

November 13, 2010; 16:00	China	2 – 1 GWS (1–0, 0–0, 0–1) (OT: 0–0) (SO: 1–0)	Japan	Kirifuri Arena; Attendance: 190

Game reference

Shi Yao
Goalies
Azusa Nakaoku
Referee:
(Japan) Kyoko Ugajin

Zhang, B. (Sun, Qi) - 16:07	1 – 0
	1 – 1	55:42 - Osawa (Adachi)
Zhang, S. (GWS) - 65:00	2 – 1

10 min
Penalties
8 min
26
Shots
38

=== Gold medal game ===
November 14, 2010; 15:00	China	1 – 3 (0–1, 1–0, 0–2)	Japan	Kirifuri Arena; Attendance: 250

Game reference

Shi Yao
Goalies
Azusa Nakaoku
Referee:
(Japan) Kyoko Ugajin

	0 – 1	19:36 - Osawa (Nakamura, Adachi)
Zhang, S. (Qi) - 22:54	1 – 1
	1 – 2	49:05 - Shimozawa (Hirano, Aoki)
	1 – 3	56:09 - Nakamura (Adachi, Kondo)

18 min
Penalties
8 min
27
Shots
50

== Scoring leaders ==
List shows the top ten skaters sorted by points, then goals, assists, and the lower penalties in minutes.

Player	GP	G	A	Pts	PIM	POS
(Japan) Yurie Adachi	3	2	5	7	0	F
(Japan) Yuka Hirano	3	2	4	6	4	F
(Japan) Saki Shimozawa	3	4	1	5	27	F
(Japan) Ami Nakamura	3	2	3	5	2	F
(Japan) Chiho Osawa	3	3	1	4	0	F
(China) Zhang Shuang	3	3	1	4	6	D
(Japan) Tomoko Sakagami	3	1	3	4	0	F
(China) Qi Xueting	3	0	4	4	4	D
(China) Zhang Ben	2	2	1	3	0	F
(China) Gao Fujin	3	2	0	2	2	F

== Leading goaltenders ==
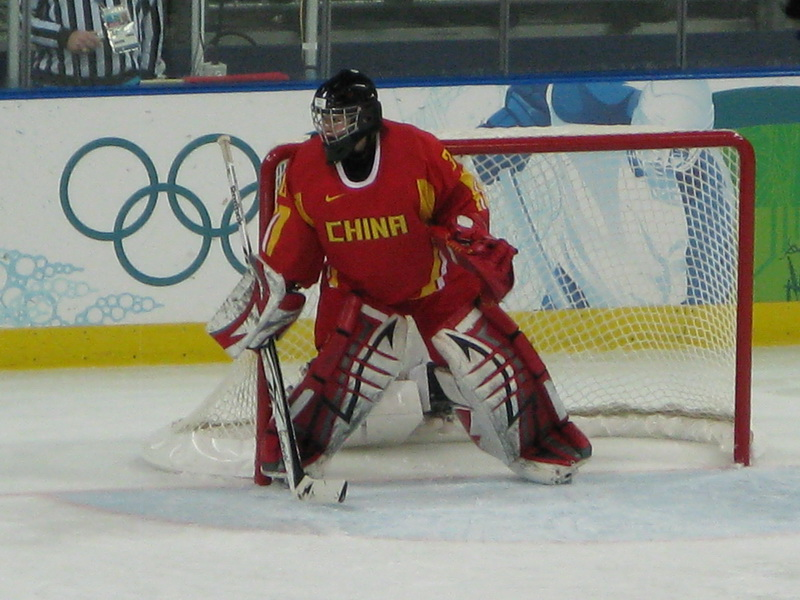
China's Shi Yao conceded four goals and finished with a save percentage of 95.45

Only the top goaltenders, based on save percentage, who have played at least 40% of their team's minutes are included in this list.

Player	MIP	SOG	GA	GAA	SVS%
(Japan) Azusa Nakaoku	145	55	2	0.83	96.36
(China) Shi Yao	125	88	4	1.92	95.45
(South Korea) Shin So-jung	120	189	19	9.5	89.95
