= Ice hockey at the 1999 Asian Winter Games – Women's tournament =

Women at the 1999 Asian Winter Games
- Venue: Gangneung Indoor Ice Rink
- Date: 30 January – 4 February 1999
- Competitors: 73 from 4 nations

Medalists
gold medal	China
silver medal	Japan
bronze medal	Kazakhstan

The women's tournament of Ice hockey at the 1999 Asian Winter Games at Gangneung, South Korea, was held from 30 January to 4 February 1999.

== Squads ==
China	Japan	Kazakhstan	South Korea
Huo Lina; Zhang Haiyan; Liu Hongmei; Li Xuan; Li Yanan; Lü Yan; Yu Xiaolin; Yang Xiuqing; Sang Hong; Chen Jing; Hu Chunrong; Diao Ying; Zhang Jing; Sun Rui; Xu Lei; Guo Lili; Wang Wei; Ma Xiaojun; Wang Linuo; Guo Hong	Yuka Oda; Haruka Watanabe; Rie Sato; Akiko Hatanaka; Maiko Obikawa; Naho Yoshimi; Yuko Osanai; Yoko Kondo; Masako Sato; Mitsuko Igarashi; Hanae Kubo; Aki Sudo; Yuki Togawa; Aki Tsuchida; Akiko Naka; Yoko Tamada; Yukari Ono; Etsuko Wada; Ayumi Sato	Anna Akimbetyeva; Natalya Skobelkina; Oxana Taikevich; Yelena Shtelmaister; Lyubov Vafina; Olessya Mukomelo; Marina Kurganova; Olga Potapova; Viktoriya Adiyeva; Yelena Agapitova; Dinara Dikambayeva; Svetlana Echtchenko; Natalya Yakovchuk; Olga Kryukova; Anna Skripnikova; Svetlana Maltseva; Mariya Prokopyeva	Cho Eun-hyun; Kim Soo-youn; Kim Eun-young; Jeong Bae-yeong; Choi Seung-sook; Hwang Keum-hwa; Lee Jung-youn; Song Min-ji; Song In-mi; Kim Su-hee; Kim Tae-sook; Shin So-ja; Park Woo-young; Han Ae-ri; Park Kyu-young; Lee Young-woo; Lee Ju-eun

== Results ==
All times are Korea Standard Time (UTC+09:00)

Pos	Team	Pld	W	D	L	GF	GA	GD	Pts
1	China	3	3	0	0	31	4	+27	6
2	Japan	3	2	0	1	28	7	+21	4
3	Kazakhstan	3	1	0	2	20	13	+7	2
4	South Korea	3	0	0	3	2	57	−55	0

Source: Official website

30 January; 15:00	Kazakhstan	17–1 (6–0, 5–0, 6–1)	South Korea	Indoor Ice Rink, Gangneung

31 January; 14:00	Japan	1–6 (0–2, 0–1, 1–3)	China	Indoor Ice Rink, Gangneung

1 February; 17:00	China	15–1 (5–0, 4–1, 6–0)	South Korea	Indoor Ice Rink, Gangneung

2 February; 14:00	Japan	2–1 (1–1, 0–0, 1–0)	Kazakhstan	Indoor Ice Rink, Gangneung

4 February; 14:00	Kazakhstan	2–10 (0–1, 0–3, 2–6)	China	Indoor Ice Rink, Gangneung

4 February; 17:00	Japan	25–0 (7–0, 13–0, 5–0)	South Korea	Indoor Ice Rink, Gangneung

== Final standing ==
Rank	Team	Pld	W	D	L
1st place, gold medalist(s)	China	3	3	0	0
2nd place, silver medalist(s)	Japan	3	2	0	1
3rd place, bronze medalist(s)	Kazakhstan	3	1	0	2
4	South Korea	3	0	0	3
