= Jin Fengling =

Chinese ice hockey player

- Born: 20 November 1982 (age 43) Harbin, Heilongjiang, China
- Height: 166 cm (5 ft 5 in)
- Weight: 56 kg (123 lb; 8 st 11 lb)
- Position: Forward
- Shot: Left
- Played for: Harbin Ice Hockey; Strathmore Rockies; Espoo Blues; Team China (NSMs)
- National team: China
- Playing career: 2000–2013
Medal record
Asian Winter Games
Bronze medal – third place	2011 Astana–Almaty	Ice hockey
Bronze medal – third place	2007 Changchun	Ice hockey
Bronze medal – third place	2003 Aomori	Ice hockey
Universiade
Silver medal – second place	2009 Harbin	Ice hockey

Jin Fengling
- Traditional Chinese: 金鳳玲
- Simplified Chinese: 金凤玲
Transcriptions
Standard Mandarin
- Hanyu Pinyin: Jīn Fènglíng

Jin Fengling (Chinese: 金凤玲; born 20 November 1982) is a Chinese retired ice hockey forward. She was a member of the Chinese women's national ice hockey team from 2000 to 2013 and represented China at nine IIHF World Championships, three Asian Winter Games, the 2011 Winter Universiade, and at the Winter Olympic Games in 2002 and 2010.

== Playing career ==
Jin played with the women's team of Harbin Ice Hockey in her hometown of Harbin, Heilongjiang, prior to joining the Chinese national team at the age of 17. She made her international debut at the 2000 IIHF Women's World Championship and played in all five games, though she did not record a point during the tournament – a performance that was repeated at the 2001 IIHF Women's World Championship. Jin's first international point was registered on the biggest stage of them all, in the women's ice hockey tournament at the 2002 Winter Olympics in Salt Lake City, an assist on a Ma Xiaojun goal against Germany. The following year, she won bronze at the women's ice hockey tournament at the 2003 Asian Winter Games in Aomori Prefecture. Between 2004 and 2009, Jin represented her home country in the top division of the IIHF World Championship, as China placed seventh in 2004, sixth in 2005 and 2007, eighth in 2008, and ninth in 2009.

After China failed to qualify for the 2006 Winter Olympics, the Chinese national team took part in the 2005–06 and 2006–07 seasons of the Naisten SM-sarja (NSMs), the premier women's league in Finland, under the name "Team China." Selected as Team China's top two players, Jin and teammate Sun Rui were invited to sign with the Espoo Blues Naiset, the top team in the Naisten SM-sarja, and played with the team during the later part of the 2005–06 season. She took home her second Asian Winter Games bronze medal with China at the 2007 Changchun games. In the 2007–08 season, she, along with her teammate Qi Xueting, played with the Strathmore Rockies of Strathmore, Alberta, in the Western Women's Hockey League (WWHL), in order to further develop in the lead-up to the 2008 World Championship.

At the 2009 Winter Universiade, Jin scored the first goal in the first game of the first women's ice hockey tournament ever included as part of the Winter Universiade programme, as China went on to win silver. She represented her country as an alternate-captain at the 2010 Winter Olympics in Vancouver, where she tallied the second-most points of all players on the team. China claimed its third consecutive bronze medal at the 2011 Asian Winter Games, boosted by Jin's tournament-leading 7 assists. After the Chinese national team was relegated from the IIHF top division at the 2009 Women's World Championship, she completed two World Championship tournaments in Division I prior to her retirement in 2013.

== Career statistics ==
=== International ===
Year	Team	Event	Result	GP	G	A	Pts	PIM
2000	China	WW	6th	5	0	0	0	4
2001	China	WW	6th	5	0	0	0	4
2002	China	OG	7th	5	0	1	1	4
2003	China	AG	3rd place, bronze medalist(s)
2004	China	WW	7th	4	1	2	3	12
2005	China	WW	6th	4	3	0	3	4
2005	China	OGQ	DNQ	3	4	1	5	4
2007	China	WW	6th	4	1	2	3	6
2007	China	AG	3rd place, bronze medalist(s)
2008	China	WW	8th	4	1	3	4	8
2009	China	WW	9th	4	0	1	1	2
2009	China	OGQ	Q	3	2	1	3	2
2009	China	U	2nd place, silver medalist(s)
2010	China	OG	7th	5	2	1	3	4
2011	China	WW	13th	4	0	2	2	6
2011	China	AG	3rd place, bronze medalist(s)	4	2	7	9	2
2012	China	WW	16th	5	4	2	6	6
2013	China	OGQ	DNQ	6	2	3	5	8
Senior totals				65	22	26	48	76
