= Svetlana Vasina =

Kazakhstani ice hockey player

- Born: 19 November 1971 (age 54) Almaty, Kazakh SSR, Soviet Union
- Height: 152 cm (5 ft 0 in)
- Weight: 51 kg (112 lb; 8 st 0 lb)
- Position: Forward
- Shot: Left
- National team: Kazakhstan
- Playing career: 1999–2009
Medal record
Representing Kazakhstan
Women's ice hockey
Asian Games
Gold medal – first place	2003 Aomori	Ice hockey
Gold medal – first place	2007 Changchun	Ice hockey

Svetlana Vasina (Vadunskaya) (Russian: Светлана Анатольевна Васина (Вадунская); born 19 November 1971) is a Kazakhstani ice hockey player. She competed in the women's tournament at the 2002 Winter Olympics.
