= 2021 IIHF Women's World Championship Division I =

Tournament details
- Host countries: France; China
- Venues: 2 (in 2 host cities)
- Dates: 11–18 April 2021 (cancelled); 8–14 April 2021 (cancelled)
- Teams: 12

The 2021 IIHF Women's World Championship Division I was scheduled to be two international ice hockey tournaments organized by the International Ice Hockey Federation. The Division I Group A tournament would have been held in Angers, France, from 11 to 18 April 2021 and the Division I Group B as the 2022 Winter Olympics test tournament in Beijing, China, from 8 to 14 April 2021.

On 18 November 2020, both tournaments were cancelled due to the COVID-19 pandemic.

== Division I Group A ==
2021 IIHF Women's World Championship Division I A
Tournament details
- Host country: France
- Venue: 1 (in 1 host city)
- Dates: 11–18 April 2021 (cancelled)
- Teams: 6

=== Planned participating teams ===
Team	Qualification
Sweden	Placed 9th in 2019 Top Division and were relegated.
France	Hosts; placed 10th in 2019 Top Division and was relegated.
Norway	Placed 3rd in 2019 Division I A.
Austria	Placed 4th in 2019 Division I A.
Slovakia	Placed 5th in 2019 Division I A.
Netherlands	Placed 1st in 2019 Division I B and were promoted.

=== Standings ===
Pos	Team	Pld	W	OTW	OTL	L	GF	GA	GD	Pts
1	Sweden	0	0	0	0	0	0	0	0	0
2	France (H)	0	0	0	0	0	0	0	0	0
3	Norway	0	0	0	0	0	0	0	0	0
4	Austria	0	0	0	0	0	0	0	0	0
5	Slovakia	0	0	0	0	0	0	0	0	0
6	Netherlands	0	0	0	0	0	0	0	0	0

(H) Host

== Division I Group B ==
2021 IIHF Women's World Championship Division I B
Tournament details
- Host country: China
- Venue: 1 (in 1 host city)
- Dates: 8–14 April 2021 (cancelled)
- Teams: 6

=== Planned participating teams ===
Team	Qualification
Italy	Placed 6th in 2019 Division I A and were relegated.
South Korea	Placed 2nd in 2019 Division I B.
Poland	Placed 3rd in 2019 Division I B.
China	Hosts; placed 4th in 2019 Division I B.
Kazakhstan	Placed 5th in 2019 Division I B.
Slovenia	Placed 1st in 2019 Division II A and were promoted.

=== Standings ===
Pos	Team	Pld	W	OTW	OTL	L	GF	GA	GD	Pts
1	Italy	0	0	0	0	0	0	0	0	0
2	South Korea	0	0	0	0	0	0	0	0	0
3	Poland	0	0	0	0	0	0	0	0	0
4	China (H)	0	0	0	0	0	0	0	0	0
5	Kazakhstan	0	0	0	0	0	0	0	0	0
6	Slovenia	0	0	0	0	0	0	0	0	0

(H) Host
