= Ice hockey at the 1996 Asian Winter Games – Women's tournament =

Women at the 1996 Asian Winter Games
- Venue: Baqu Arena
- Date: 5–8 February 1996
- Nations: 3

Medalists
gold medal	China
silver medal	Japan
bronze medal	Kazakhstan

The women's tournament of Ice hockey at the 1996 Asian Winter Games at Harbin, China, was held from 5 to 8 February 1996.

It was the first year that featured women in ice hockey competition. There were no qualification tournaments and only three teams participated.

== Results ==
Pos	Team	Pld	W	D	L	GF	GA	GD	Pts
1	China	2	2	0	0	22	3	+19	4
2	Japan	2	1	0	1	9	11	−2	2
3	Kazakhstan	2	0	0	2	2	19	−17	0

Source: Results

5 February	China	9–3	Japan	Baqu Arena, Harbin

6 February	China	13–0	Kazakhstan	Baqu Arena, Harbin

8 February	Japan	6–2	Kazakhstan	Baqu Arena, Harbin

== Final standing ==
Rank	Team	Pld	W	D	L
1st place, gold medalist(s)	China	2	2	0	0
2nd place, silver medalist(s)	Japan	2	1	0	1
3rd place, bronze medalist(s)	Kazakhstan	2	0	0	2
