= Zhang Jing (ice hockey) =

Chinese ice hockey player and coach (born 1977)

- Born: 18 March 1977 (age 49) Harbin, China
- Height: 166 cm (5 ft 5 in)
- Weight: 56 kg (123 lb; 8 st 11 lb)
- Position: Forward
- Shot: Left
- Played for: Harbin IHC
- Current WCIHL coach: Beijing Swift
- National team: China
- Playing career: 1992–2007
- Coaching career: c. 2007–present
Medal record
Asian Winter Games
Gold medal – first place	1996 Harbin	Ice hockey
Gold medal – first place	1999 Gangwon	Ice hockey
Bronze medal – third place	2003 Aomori	Ice hockey
Bronze medal – third place	2007 Changchun	Ice hockey

Zhang Jing
- Traditional Chinese: 張晶
- Simplified Chinese: 张晶
Transcriptions
Standard Mandarin
- Hanyu Pinyin: Zhāng Jīng

Zhang Jing (born 18 March 1977) is a Chinese ice hockey coach and retired forward. She has served as assistant coach of the Chinese national team since 2025 and head coach of the Beijing Youth Women's Ice Hockey Team since 2016.

Zhang's playing career with the Chinese national team included two Winter Olympic Games, four Asian Winter Games, and seven IIHF Women's World Championship tournaments.

== Playing career ==
Zhang began playing ice hockey in 1989 and joined the Chinese national program in 1992.

She made her debut with the Chinese women's national ice hockey team in the women's ice hockey tournament at the 1996 Asian Winter Games in her home city of Harbin. It was the first time women's ice hockey had been included in the Asian Games, and China claimed gold in the historic tournament.

She next participated in the 1997 IIHF Women's World Championship, at which she notched two assists across five games. The following year, she participated in the inaugural Olympic women's ice hockey tournament at the 1998 Winter Olympics in Nagano. The tournament saw the best finish for the Chinese program on the Olympic stage, as the team finished in fourth place.

== Coaching career ==
Following the conclusion of her playing career, Zhang chose to dedicate herself to coaching at the youth level, rather than accept the offer of a coaching position with the national team. She was motivated by the belief that to make Chinese women's ice hockey strong at the international level, training must begin with children.

She has served as head coach of the Beijing Youth Women's Ice Hockey Team (北京市青少年女子冰球队), also called the Beijing Swift, since 2016. Under Zhang's guidance, the team has participated in two National Winter Games of China, winning the silver medal in 2016 and gold in 2024.

== Career statistics ==
Note: GP = Games played; G = Goals; A = Assists; Pts = Points; PIM = Penalty minutes;

				Regular season
Year	Team	Event	Result	GP	G	A	Pts	PIM
1997	China	WC	4th	5	0	2	2	4
1998	China	OG	4th	6	0	0	0	2
1999	China	WC	5th	5	1	2	3	4
2000	China	WC	6th	5	0	1	1	0
2001	China	WC	6th	5	1	0	1	6
2002	China	OG	7th	5	0	0	0	0
2004	China	WC	7th	4	3	0	3	0
2005	China	WC	6th	5	0	0	0	2
2006	China	OGQ	DNQ	3	1	3	4	0
2007	China	WC	6th	4	0	1	1	2
