= Yoon Kyung-won =

South Korean ice hockey player

Yoon Kyung-won 윤경원
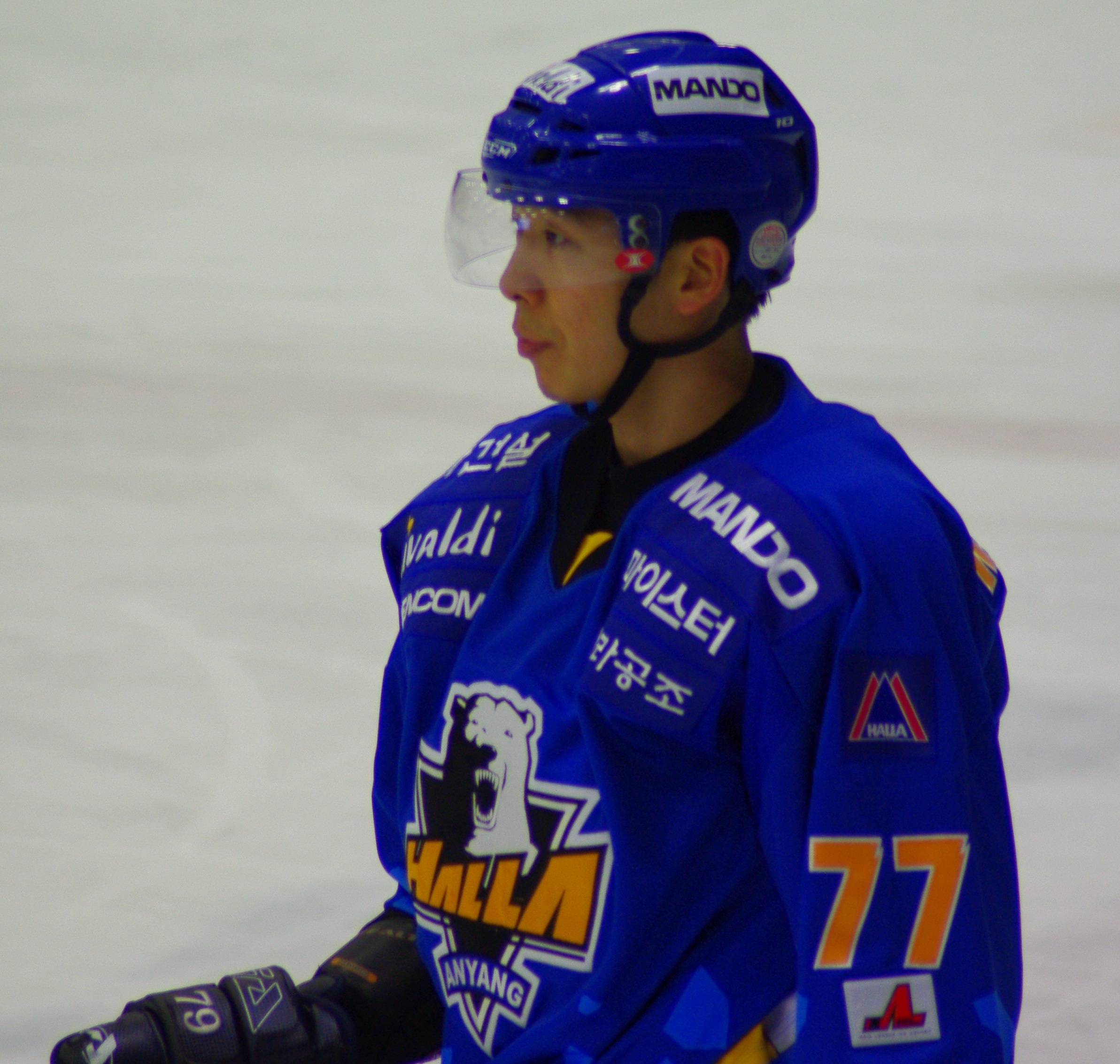
- Yoon during pre-game warm-up.
- Born: 1 January 1982 (age 43) South Korea
- Height: 1.82 m (6 ft 0 in)
- Weight: 87 kg (192 lb; 13 st 10 lb)
- Position: Defenceman
- Shoots: Left
- ALH team: Anyang Halla
- Playing career: 2004–present

Yoon Kyung-won (Korean: 윤경원; born 1 January 1982 in South Korea) is a Korean professional ice hockey defenceman. He is playing in his sixth year for Anyang Halla after returning from serving his 2 years military service.
