= Wang Nan (ice hockey) =

Chinese ice hockey player

Wang Nan 王楠
- Born: 22 April 1988 (age 38) Harbin, Heilongjiang, China
- Height: 165 cm (5 ft 5 in)
- Weight: 67 kg (148 lb; 10 st 8 lb)
- Position: Defense
- Shot: Left
- Played for: Harbin Ice Hockey; Team China (Naisten SM-sarja)
- National team: China
- Playing career: c. 2006–c. 2014
Medal record
Women's ice hockey
Asian Winter Games
Bronze medal – third place	2011 Astana–Almaty
Bronze medal – third place	2007 Changchun

Wang Nan (Chinese: 王楠; pinyin: Wáng Nán; born 22 April 1988) is a Chinese retired ice hockey player. She was a member of the Chinese women's national ice hockey team and represented China at the Asian Winter Games in 2007 and 2011, winning bronze at both events. She was on the entry list for the women's ice hockey tournament at the 2010 Winter Olympics but was not selected to the final Chinese roster and did not play.
