= Diana Da Rugna =

Italian ice hockey player (born 1989)

Personal information
- Nationality: Italian
- Born: 16 October 1989 (age 36) Feltre, Italy

Sport
- Sport: Ice hockey

Diana Da Rugna (born 16 October 1989) is an Italian ice hockey player. She competed in the women's tournament at the 2006 Winter Olympics.
