= Han Danni =

Chinese ice hockey player

Han Danni 韩丹妮
- Born: 9 January 1991 (age 35) Harbin, Heilongjiang, China
- Height: 166 cm (5 ft 5 in)
- Weight: 59 kg (130 lb; 9 st 4 lb)
- Position: Goaltender
- Caught: Left
- Played for: Harbin Ice Hockey; Qiqihar Ice Hockey
- National team: China
- Playing career: before 2008–after 2011
Medal record
Women's ice hockey
Representing China
Asian Winter Games
Bronze medal – third place	2011 Astana-Almaty

Han Danni (simplified Chinese: 韩丹妮; traditional Chinese: 韓丹妮; pinyin: Hán Dānnī; born 9 January 1991) is a Chinese retired ice hockey goaltender. She was a member of the Chinese women's national ice hockey team and represented China in the women's ice hockey tournament at the 2010 Winter Olympics.
