= Amandine Cuasnet =

French ice hockey player

- Born: 24 May 1991 (age 33); Dunkirk, France
- Height: 1.63 m (5 ft 4 in)
- Weight: 64 kg (141 lb; 10 st 1 lb)
- Position: Forward
- Shoots: Left
- CFHF team Former teams: Corsaires de Dunkerque; Pôle France Féminin
- National team: France
- Playing career: 2008–present

Amandine Cuasnet (born 24 May 1991) is a French ice hockey player for Corsaires de Dunkerque and the French national team.

She represented France at the 2019 IIHF Women's World Championship.
