= Kang Nara =

North Korean defector and social media influencer

- Born: Kang Yun-so; July 9, 1997 (age 29); Cheongjin, North Hamgyong Province, North Korea
- Known for: Defection from North Korea

YouTube information
- Channel: 놀새나라TV
- Years active: February 24, 2015 – present

Korean name
- Hangul: 강나라
- RR: Gang Nara
- MR: Kang Nara

Birth name
- Hangul: 강윤서
- RR: Gang Yunseo
- MR: Kang Yunsŏ

Kang Nara (Korean: 강나라; born July 9, 1997) is a North Korean defector and social media influencer. She had high songbun before defecting in 2014.

She has appeared on Now On My Way to Meet You, Moranbong club, and North Korean Woman, South Korean Man. She was a consultant on the production of Crash Landing on You.

== See also ==
- Kang Chol-hwan
- Yeonmi Park
- Shin Dong-hyuk
- Lee Hyeon-seo
- Lee Soon-ok
