= Hanae Kubo =

Japanese ice hockey player

Hanae Kubo 久保英恵
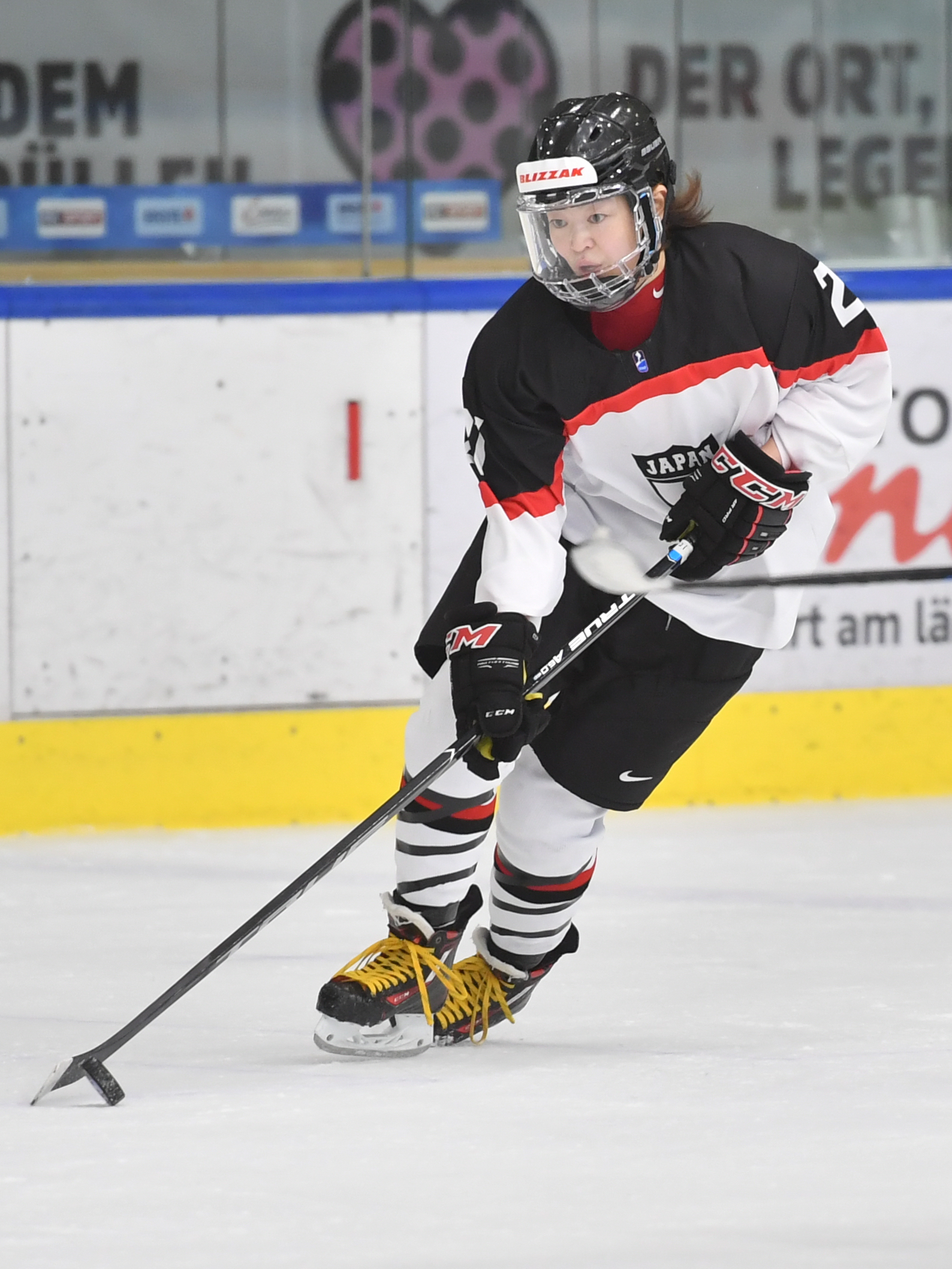
- Kubo in 2017
- Born: 10 October 1982 (age 44) Tomakomai, Hokkaido, Japan
- Height: 1.68 m (5 ft 6 in)
- Weight: 64 kg (141 lb; 10 st 1 lb)
- Position: Forward
- Shoots: Right
- WJIHL team Former teams: Seibu Princess Rabbits; Oakville Ice
- National team: Japan
- Playing career: 1999–present
Medal record
Asian Winter Games
Gold medal – first place	2017 Sapporo	Ice hockey
Silver medal – second place	1999 Gangwon	Ice hockey
Silver medal – second place	2003 Aomori	Ice hockey
Silver medal – second place	2007 Changchun	Ice hockey

Hanae Kubo (久保 英恵, Kubo Hanae; born 10 December 1982) is a Japanese ice hockey player and member of the Japanese national team, currently playing with the Seibu Princess Rabbits of the Women's Japan Ice Hockey League (WJIHL) and All-Japan Women's Ice Hockey Championship.

Kubo made her international debut with the Japanese national ice hockey team in the women's ice hockey tournament at the 1999 Asian Winter Games. With more than two decades on the national team, she is the longest tenured player in team history and has represented Japan at the 2014, 2018, and 2022 Winter Olympics, at thirteen IIHF Women's World Championships, and at four Asian Winter Games. She participated in the World Championship Top Division tournaments in 2000, 2004, 2015, 2016, 2019, and 2021; the Division I Group A tournaments in 2012, 2013, and 2017; the Division I tournaments in 2001, 2003, and 2005; and the Pool B tournament in 1999.
