= Jiang Na =

Chinese ice hockey player

Jiang Na 姜娜
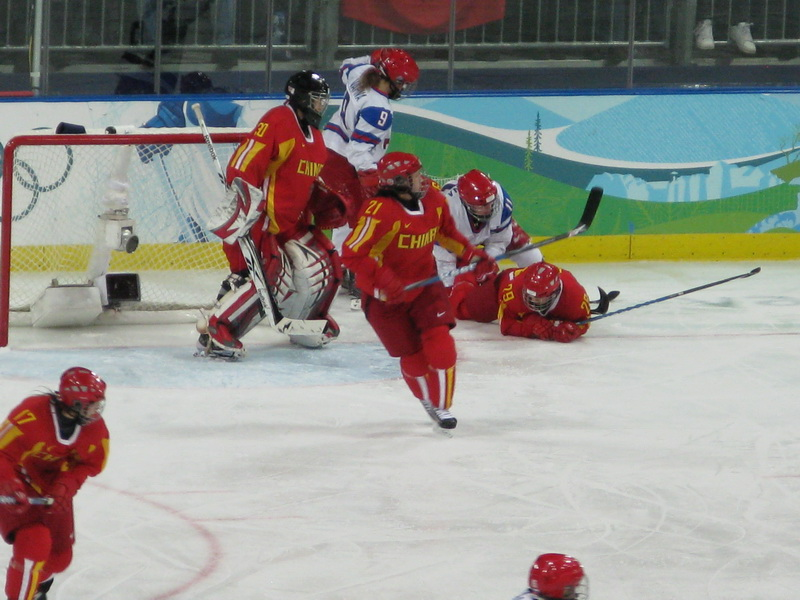
- Jiang moves up ice against Russia at the 2010 Winter Olympics
- Born: 18 October 1988 (age 38) Harbin, Heilongjiang, China
- Height: 175 cm (5 ft 9 in)
- Weight: 65 kg (143 lb; 10 st 3 lb)
- Position: Defence
- Shot: Left
- Played for: Team China (Naisten SM-sarja); Harbin Ice Hockey
- National team: China
Medal record
Women's ice hockey
Asian Winter Games
Bronze medal – third place	2011 Astana–Almaty
Bronze medal – third place	2007 Changchun

Jiang Na (Chinese: 姜娜; pinyin: Jiāng Nà; born 18 October 1988) is a Chinese retired ice hockey defenceman. She was a member of the Chinese women's national ice hockey team and represented China in the women's ice hockey tournament at the 2010 Winter Olympics.
