= Cui Shanshan =

Chinese ice hockey player (born 1987)

- Born: 8 May 1987 (age 39) Harbin, Heilongjiang, China
- Height: 178 cm (5 ft 10 in)
- Weight: 65 kg (143 lb; 10 st 3 lb)
- Position: Forward
- Shot: Right
- Played for: Team China (NSMs); Harbin Ice Hockey
- National team: China
- Playing career: c. 2005–c. 2012
Medal record
Asian Winter Games
Bronze medal – third place	2007 Changchun	Ice hockey
Bronze medal – third place	2011 Astana–Almaty	Ice hockey
Universiade
Silver medal – second place	2009 Harbin	Ice hockey

Cui Shanshan
- Traditional Chinese: 崔珊珊
- Simplified Chinese: 崔珊珊
Transcriptions
Standard Mandarin
- Hanyu Pinyin: Cuī Shānshān

Cui Shanshan (Chinese: 崔珊珊; born 8 May 1987) is a Chinese retired ice hockey player. She was a member of the Chinese women's national ice hockey team and represented China in the women's ice hockey tournament at the 2010 Winter Olympics.
