= Tan Anqi =

Chinese ice hockey player

Tan Anqi 谭安琪
- Born: 10 June 1986 (age 40) Harbin, Heilongjiang, China
- Height: 175 cm (5 ft 9 in)
- Weight: 67 kg (148 lb; 10 st 8 lb)
- Position: Defense
- Shot: Left
- Played for: Harbin Ice Hockey; Team China (Naisten SM-sarja)
- National team: China
- Playing career: c. 2004–c. 2010
Medal record
Women's ice hockey
Asian Winter Games
Bronze medal – third place	2007 Changchun

Tan Anqi (simplified Chinese: 谭安琪; traditional Chinese: 譚安琪; pinyin: Tán Ānqí; born 10 June 1986) is a Chinese retired ice hockey player and coach. She was a member of the Chinese women's national ice hockey team and represented China in the women's ice hockey tournament at the 2010 Winter Olympics. Tan was a coach of the Hong Kong women's national ice hockey team during 2014 to 2017.
