= Wang Linuo =

Chinese ice hockey player

Wang Linuo 王莉诺
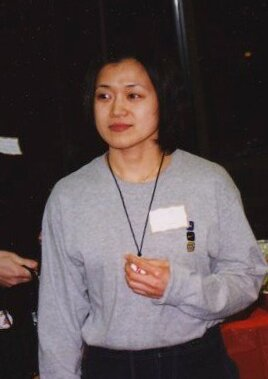
- Linuo at the National Sports Center in Blaine, Minnesota, training for the Olympics.
- Born: 28 August 1979 (age 47) Harbin, Heilongjiang, China
- Height: 160 cm (5 ft 3 in)
- Weight: 57 kg (126 lb; 9 st 0 lb)
- Position: Forward
- Shot: Left
- Played for: Calgary Oval X-Treme; Team China (Naisten SM-sarja); Harbin Ice Hockey
- National team: China
- Playing career: c. 1998–2010
Medal record
Women's ice hockey
Asian Winter Games
Gold medal – first place	1999 Gangwon
Bronze medal – third place	2007 Changchun
Bronze medal – third place	2003 Aomori

Wang Linuo (simplified Chinese: 王莉诺; traditional Chinese: 王莉諾; pinyin: Wáng Lìnuò; born 28 August 1979) is a Chinese retired ice hockey player. She was a member of the Chinese women's national ice hockey team and represented China in the women's ice hockey tournaments at the 2002 and 2010 Winter Olympics, serving as team captain in 2010.
