= Huo Lina =

Chinese ice hockey player

- Born: 30 March 1973 (age 53)
- Height: 164 cm (5 ft 5 in)
- Weight: 70 kg (154 lb; 11 st 0 lb)
- Position: Goaltender
- Caught: Right
- Played for: Harbin Ice Hockey
- National team: China
- Playing career: c. 1996–2007
Medal record
Asian Winter Games
Gold medal – first place	1999 Gangneung	Ice hockey
Bronze medal – third place	2007 Changchun	Ice hockey

Huo Lina (born 30 March 1973) is a Chinese retired ice hockey goaltender. With the Chinese national ice hockey team, she competed in the women's tournament at the 1998 Winter Olympics in Nagano and at six IIHF Women's World Championships. She is a two-time Asian Winter Games medalist.

== Career statistics ==
Year	Team	Event	Result	GP	W	L	T/OT	MIN	GA	SO	GAA	SV%
1997	China	WC	4th	3	-	-	-	-	-	-	3.80	0.885
1998	China	OG	4th	1	0	1	0	9:56	2	0	12.08	0.667
1999	China	AWG	1st place, gold medalist(s)	-	-	-	-	-	-	-	-	-
2000	China	WC	6th	2	-	-	-	-	-	-	5.25	0.881
2001	China	WC	6th	1	-	-	-	-	-	0	3.75	0.885
2005	China	WC	6th	5	1	3	1	300:00	-	1	3.80	0.910
2007	China	AWG	3rd place, bronze medalist(s)	-	-	-	-	-	-	-	-	-
