= Yuka Hirano =

Japanese ice hockey player

Yuka Hirano 平野由佳
- Born: January 26, 1987 (age 39) Matsusaka, Mie, Japan
- Height: 1.57 m (5 ft 2 in)
- Weight: 52 kg (115 lb; 8 st 3 lb)
- Position: Right wing
- Shot: Right
- Played for: AIK IF; Salo HT
- National team: Japan
- Playing career: 2000–2016
Medal record
Women's ice hockey
Representing Japan
Asian Winter Games
Gold medal – first place	2003 Aomori
Silver medal – second place	2007 Changchun
Silver medal – second place	2011 Astana-Almaty
Challenge Cup of Asia
Gold medal – first place	2011 Japan
Silver medal – second place	2010 China

Yuka Hirano (平野 由佳, Hirano Yuka; born 26 January 1987) is a Japanese retired ice hockey player. She played with the Japanese women's national ice hockey team during 2000 to 2016 and holds the record for most games played with the national team. She represented Japan in the women's ice hockey tournament at the 2014 Winter Olympics in Sochi and in ten IIHF Women's World Championships – five at the Top Division level, three at the Division I level, and two at the Division I A level.
