= Zhang Ben =

Chinese ice hockey player

Zhang Ben (simplified Chinese: 张犇; traditional Chinese: 張犇; pinyin: Zhāng Bēn; born 22 July 1985 in Harbin, Heilongjiang) is a Chinese female ice hockey player. She is a member of the China women's national ice hockey team. She competed for China at the 2010 Winter Olympics. The team finished 7th out of 8 teams.

== International goals ==
No.	Date	Venue	Opponent	Score	Result	Competition
1.	28 January 2007	Changchun, China	South Korea	1–0	20–0	2007 Asian Winter Games
2.	28 January 2007	Changchun, China	South Korea	5–0	20–0	2007 Asian Winter Games
3.	28 January 2007	Changchun, China	South Korea	14–0	20–0	2007 Asian Winter Games
4.	3 February 2007	Changchun, China	North Korea	6–2	6–3	2007 Asian Winter Games
5.	29 January 2011	Almaty, Kazakhstan	North Korea	8–1	8–1	2011 Asian Winter Games
6.	31 January 2011	Almaty, Kazakhstan	South Korea	8–0	10–0	2011 Asian Winter Games
