= Lyubov Ibragimova =

Kazakhstani ice hockey player

- Born: 5 April 1984 (age 42) Alma-Ata, Kazakh SSR, Soviet Union
- Height: 154 cm (5 ft 1 in)
- Weight: 47 kg (104 lb; 7 st 6 lb)
- Position: Forward
- Shot: Left
- National team: Kazakhstan
- Playing career: 2000–2005
Medal record
Representing Kazakhstan
Women's ice hockey
Asian Games
Gold medal – first place	2003 Aomori	Ice hockey

Lyubov Ibragimova née: Alekseyeva (Russian: Любовь Сергеевна Алексеева; born 5 May 1984) is a Kazakhstani ice hockey player. She competed in the women's tournament at the 2002 Winter Olympics.
