= Yelena Shtelmaister =

Kazakhstani ice hockey player

Personal information
- Nationality: Kazakhstani
- Born: 15 September 1977 (age 48) Karaganda, Kazakh SSR, Soviet Union

Sport
- Sport: Ice hockey

Yelena Shtelmaister (Елена Станиславовна Штельмайстер, born 15 September 1977) is a Kazakhstani ice hockey player. She competed in the women's tournament at the 2002 Winter Olympics.
