= Emi Nonaka =

Japanese ice hockey player

Emi Nonaka 野中 絵美
- Born: August 21, 1984 (age 42)
- Position: Defense
- Shoots: Left
- Played for: Kamori Kankou Bears; Japanese national ice hockey team

Nonaka Emi (野中 絵美, Nonaka Emi; born August 21, 1984) is a Japanese ice hockey player. Her position is defense and she shoots left. She has played for Japan constantly in World Championships since 2000, when she made her first national team appearance while still in junior high school.

== Statistics ==
Year	Division	GP	G	A	PTS	PIM	+/-	GWG	PPG	SHG	SOG	S%
2000	Pool A	5	0	0	0	2	-2	0	0	0	0	0
2001	Div 1	4	1	1	2	8	+4	0	0	0	11	9.09
2003	Div 1	5	0	1	1	2	+1	0	0	0	0	0
2004	WW	4	0	0	0	6	-2	0	0	0	0	0
2005	Div 1	5	0	0	0	6	+4	0	0	0	10	0
2007	Div 1	5	0	4	4	2	+2	0	0	0	9	0
2009	WW	4	0	1	1	4	-2	0	0	0	6	0
Total	Pool A & WW	13	0	1	1	12	-6	0	0	0	6	0
Total	Div 1	19	1	6	7	18	+11	0	0	0	30	3.33
