= Su Ziwei =

Chinese ice hockey player

Personal information
- National team: China
- Born: December 9, 1984 (age 40); Harbin, Heilongjiang, China

Sport
- Sport: Ice hockey

Su Ziwei (born December 9, 1984) is a Chinese female ice hockey player. She competed for China at the 2010 Winter Olympics. The team finished seventh out of eight teams.
