= Viktoriya Sazonova =

Kazakhstani ice hockey player

Personal information
- Nationality: Kazakhstani
- Born: 30 August 1983 (age 42) Alma-Ata, Kazakh SSR, Soviet Union

Sport
- Sport: Ice hockey

Viktoriya Sazonova (Виктория Александровна Сазонова, born 30 August 1983) is a Kazakhstani ice hockey player. She competed in the women's tournament at the 2002 Winter Olympics.
