= Zhang Shuang (ice hockey) =

Chinese ice hockey player

- Born: 7 March 1987 (age 39) Harbin, Heilongjiang, China
- Height: 160 cm (5 ft 3 in)
- Weight: 57 kg (126 lb; 9 st 0 lb)
- Position: Defense
- Shoots: Left
- Played for: KRS Vanke Rays; Team China (NSMs); Harbin Ice Hockey
- National team: China
- Playing career: 2004–present
Medal record
Asian Winter Games
| Bronze medal – third place | 2011 Astana-Almaty | Ice hockey |
| Bronze medal – third place | 2007 Changchun | Ice hockey |
Winter Universiade
| Silver medal – second place | 2009 Harbin | Ice hockey |

Zhang Shuang
- Traditional Chinese: 張爽
- Simplified Chinese: 张爽
Transcriptions
Standard Mandarin
- Hanyu Pinyin: Zhāng Shuǎng

Zhang Shuang (Chinese: 张爽; born 7 March 1987), also known by the Western name Nikki Zhang, is a Chinese ice hockey player and former member of the Chinese national team. She most recently played with the KRS Vanke Rays during the 2020–21 season of the Zhenskaya Hockey League (ZhHL).

== International play ==
Zhang participated in six IIHF Women's World Championships with the Chinese national team, including the Top Division tournaments in 2005, 2007, 2008, and 2009. She represented China in the women's ice hockey tournament at the 2010 Winter Olympics in Vancouver and won bronze medals in the women's ice hockey tournament at the 2007 Asian Winter Games in Changchun and in the women's ice hockey tournament at the 2011 Asian Winter Games in Astana and Almaty.

Zhang won a silver medal with the Chinese under-25 team in the women's ice hockey tournament at the 2009 Winter Universiade in her home city of Harbin.
