= Svetlana Maltseva =

Kazakhstani ice hockey player

Personal information
- Nationality: Kazakhstani
- Born: 29 October 1970 (age 55) Alma-Ata, Kazakh SSR, Soviet Union

Sport
- Sport: Ice hockey

Svetlana Maltseva (Светлана Евгеньевна Мальцева, born 29 October 1970) is a Kazakhstani ice hockey player. She competed in the women's tournament at the 2002 Winter Olympics.
