= Kazakhstan women's national ice hockey team =

Kazakhstan
- The Emblem of Kazakhstan is the badge used on the players jerseys
- Association: Kazakhstan Ice Hockey Federation
- General manager: Viktoria Sazonova
- Head coach: Alexander Tebenkov
- Assistants: Zhassulan Orazbayev
- Captain: Anastassiya Orazbayeva
- Most games: Tatyana Koroleva (124)
- Top scorer: Zarnia Vallter (36)
- Most points: Zarnia Vallter (58)
- Team colors
- IIHF code: KAZ

Ranking
- Current IIHF: 22 (3 June 2026)
- Highest IIHF: 7 (2011)
- Lowest IIHF: 22 (2023)

First international
- Latvia 4–0 Kazakhstan (Riga, Latvia; 21 October 1995)

Biggest win
- Kazakhstan 19–0 South Korea (Misawa, Japan; 3 February 2003); Kazakhstan 19–0 Hong Kong (Sapporo, Japan; 23 February 2017)

Biggest defeat
- China 13–0 Kazakhstan (Harbin, China; 6 February 1996); Canada 13–0 Kazakhstan (Linköping, Sweden; 3 April 2005)

Olympics
- Appearances: 1 (first in 2002)

World Championships
- Appearances: 22 (first in 2000)
- Best result: 6th (2009)

Asian Winter Games
- Appearances: 7 (first in 1996)
- Best result: Gold (2003, 2007, 2011)

International record (W–L–T)
- 121–134–12

The Kazakhstan women's national ice hockey team represents Kazakhstan in top international ice hockey competition, including the International Ice Hockey Federation's Women's World Championship. The women's national team is controlled by Kazakhstan Ice Hockey Federation. Kazakhstan had 127 female players in 2011.

== Tournament record ==
=== Olympic Games ===
- 2002 – Finished in 8th place

=== World Championship ===
- 1999 – Finished in 17th/18th place (1st in Pool B qualifying group, promoted to Pool B)
- 2000 – Finished in 9th place (1st in Pool B, promoted to Top Division)
- 2001 – Finished in 8th place (relegated to Division I)
- 2003 – Finished in 10th place (2nd in Division I)
- 2004 – Finished in 10th place (1st in Division I, promoted to Top Division)
- 2005 – Finished in 7th place
- 2007 – Finished in 9th place
- 2008 – Finished in 10th place (1st in Division I, promoted to Top Division)
- 2009 – Finished in 6th place
- 2011 – Finished in 8th place (relegated to Division I)
- 2012 – Finished in 14th place (6th in Division IA, relegated to Division IB)
- 2013 – Finished in 19th place (5th in Division IB)
- 2014 – Finished in 20th place (6th in Division IB, relegated to Division IIA)
- 2015 – Finished in 21st place (1st in Division IIA, promoted to Division IB)
- 2016 – Finished in 17th place (3rd in Division IB)
- 2017 – Finished in 16th place (2nd in Division IB)
- 2018 – Finished in 19th place (4th in Division IB)
- 2019 – Finished in 21st place (5th in Division IB)
- 2020 – Cancelled due to the COVID-19 pandemic
- 2021 – Cancelled due to the COVID-19 pandemic
- 2022 – Finished in 19th place (4th in Division IB)
- 2023 – Finished in 22nd place (6th in Division IB, relegated to Division IIA)
- 2024 – Finished in 23rd place (1st in Division IIA, promoted to Division IB)
- 2025 – Finished in 20th place (4th in Division IB)
- 2026 – Finished in 19th place (3rd in Division IB)

=== Asian Winter Games ===
Kazakhstan has participated in every women's ice hockey tournament contested at the Asian Winter Games. The squad has claimed a medal in every tournament, including three golds.

- 1996 – 3rd (bronze)
- 1999 – 3rd (bronze)
- 2003 – 1st
- 2007 – 1st
- 2011 – 1st
- 2017 – 3rd (bronze)
- 2025 – 2nd (silver)

=== IIHF Asia Championship ===
- 2025 – 3rd (bronze)
- 2026 – 3rd (bronze)
- 2027 – 3rd (bronze)

=== European Championship ===
- 1996 – Finished in 13th place (7th in Pool B)

== Team ==
=== Current roster ===
The roster for the women's ice hockey tournament at the 2025 Asian Winter Games.

Head coach: Alexandr Tebenkov
Assistant coach: Darya Dmitriyeva, Zhassulan Orazbayev

No.	Pos.	Name	Height	Weight	Birthdate	Team
1	G	Zlatotsveta Feoktistova	1.57 m (5 ft 2 in)	55 kg (121 lb)	29 January 2007 (aged 18)	(Kazakhstan) Torpedo Ust-Kamenogorsk
2	D	Alexandra Voronova	1.72 m (5 ft 8 in)	65 kg (143 lb)	4 May 1998 (aged 26)	(Kazakhstan) Tomiris Astana
3	F	Munira Sayakhatkyzy	1.61 m (5 ft 3 in)	55 kg (121 lb)	9 September 2003 (aged 21)	(Kazakhstan) Torpedo Ust-Kamenogorsk
4	D	Katrin Meskini	1.76 m (5 ft 9 in)	66 kg (146 lb)	18 August 2005 (aged 19)	(Kazakhstan) Torpedo Ust-Kamenogorsk
5	F	Malika Aldabergenova – A	1.68 m (5 ft 6 in)	68 kg (150 lb)	5 May 1998 (aged 26)	(Kazakhstan) Aisulu Almaty
7	F	Pernesh Ashimova	1.54 m (5 ft 1 in)	54 kg (119 lb)	29 July 1996 (aged 28)	(Kazakhstan) Aisulu Almaty
8	F	Nadezhda Filimonova	1.60 m (5 ft 3 in)	60 kg (130 lb)	11 February 1997 (aged 27)	(Kazakhstan) Tomiris Astana
9	D	Dariya Moldabay – A	1.65 m (5 ft 5 in)	68 kg (150 lb)	23 January 1993 (aged 32)	(Kazakhstan) Tomiris Astana
10	F	Alexandra Shegay	1.55 m (5 ft 1 in)	52 kg (115 lb)	11 June 2001 (aged 23)	(Kazakhstan) Tomiris Astana
11	D	Polina Yakovleva	1.68 m (5 ft 6 in)	61 kg (134 lb)	28 November 2006 (aged 18)	(Kazakhstan) Torpedo Ust-Kamenogorsk
12	F	Dilnaz Sayakhatkyzy	1.60 m (5 ft 3 in)	57 kg (126 lb)	9 September 2003 (aged 21)	(Kazakhstan) Torpedo Ust-Kamenogorsk
13	D	Madina Tursynova	1.61 m (5 ft 3 in)	60 kg (130 lb)	13 November 1996 (aged 28)	(Kazakhstan) Aisulu Almaty
14	F	Larissa Sviridova	1.65 m (5 ft 5 in)	54 kg (119 lb)	23 September 1985 (aged 39)	(Kazakhstan) Aisulu Almaty
15	D	Anna Pyatkova	1.73 m (5 ft 8 in)	78 kg (172 lb)	2 September 2001 (aged 23)	(Kazakhstan) Aisulu Almaty
17	D	Aida Olzhabayeva	1.61 m (5 ft 3 in)	53 kg (117 lb)	1 May 1997 (aged 27)	(Kazakhstan) Aisulu Almaty
18	F	Anastassiya Orazbayeva – C	1.60 m (5 ft 3 in)	57 kg (126 lb)	8 August 1994 (aged 30)	(Kazakhstan) Tomiris Astana
19	F	Alina Ivanchenko	1.66 m (5 ft 5 in)	56 kg (123 lb)	23 December 2001 (aged 23)	(Kazakhstan) Aisulu Almaty
20	G	Arina Chshyokolova	1.65 m (5 ft 5 in)	65 kg (143 lb)	17 March 1999 (aged 25)	(Kazakhstan) Tomiris Astana
21	D	Yuliya Butorina	1.65 m (5 ft 5 in)	58 kg (128 lb)	17 January 1995 (aged 30)	(Kazakhstan) Tomiris Astana
22	F	Sofiya Zubkova	1.60 m (5 ft 3 in)	55 kg (121 lb)	7 January 2008 (aged 17)	(Kazakhstan) Torpedo Ust-Kamenogorsk
23	F	Tatyana Koroleva	1.56 m (5 ft 1 in)	63 kg (139 lb)	29 March 1986 (aged 38)	(Kazakhstan) Aisulu Almaty
24	F	Yekaterina Kutsenko	1.65 m (5 ft 5 in)	68 kg (150 lb)	15 August 2001 (aged 23)	(Kazakhstan) Tomiris Astana
25	G	Polina Govtva	1.60 m (5 ft 3 in)	60 kg (130 lb)	23 November 2002 (aged 22)	(Kazakhstan) Torpedo Ust-Kamenogorsk

== All-time record against other nations ==
Last match update: 12 March 2022

Key
Positive balance (more Wins)
Neutral balance (Wins = Losses)
Negative balance (more Losses)

Team	GP	W	T	L	GF	GA
France	41	24	2	15	130	84
North Korea	10	9	0	1	40	13
South Korea	17	11	0	6	91	22
Great Britain	4	4	0	0	14	8
Czech Republic	6	4	0	2	12	18
Slovenia	2	2	0	0	23	3
Poland	5	3	0	2	18	14
Hong Kong	1	1	0	0	19	0
Croatia	1	1	0	0	12	1
New Zealand	1	1	0	0	10	0
Thailand	1	1	0	0	8	0
Chinese Taipei	1	1	0	0	7	1
Mexico	1	1	0	0	3	1
Germany	9	4	1	4	11	23
Norway	8	4	0	4	19	18
Denmark	2	1	0	1	4	3
Spain	1	0	0	1	2	3
United States	1	0	0	1	0	9
Italy	5	2	0	3	9	10
Japan	11	5	0	6	20	31
Finland	2	0	0	2	3	12
Netherlands	5	1	0	3	11	13
Russia	7	2	1	4	10	31
Hungary	3	0	0	3	5	10
Canada	4	0	0	4	0	38
Slovakia	8	2	0	6	11	14
Switzerland	15	4	3	8	35	53
Latvia	14	4	2	8	34	34
Sweden	5	0	0	5	3	27
Austria	13	3	0	10	18	42
China	20	5	3	12	27	66
Total	223	101	12	110	609	602

== See also ==
- Kazakhstan women's national under-18 ice hockey team
- Kazakhstan men's national ice hockey team
- Ice hockey in Kazakhstan
