= Natalya Yakovchuk =

Kazakhstani ice hockey player

Personal information
- Nationality: Kazakhstani
- Born: 29 July 1975 (age 50) Alma-Ata, Kazakh SSR, Soviet Union

Sport
- Sport: Ice hockey

Natalya Yakovchuk (Наталья Владимировна Яковчук, born 29 July 1975) is a Kazakhstani ice hockey player. She competed in the women's tournament at the 2002 Winter Olympics.
