= Gao Fujin =

Chinese ice hockey player

- Born: 15 July 1985 (age 41) Harbin, Heilongjiang, China
- Height: 162 cm (5 ft 4 in)
- Weight: 65 kg (143 lb; 10 st 3 lb)
- Position: Forward
- Shot: Left
- Played for: Harbin Ice Hockey; Team China (NSMs)
- National team: China
- Playing career: c. 2004–2013
Medal record
Asian Winter Games
Bronze medal – third place	2007 Changchun	Ice hockey
Bronze medal – third place	2011 Astana–Almaty	Ice hockey
Universiade
Silver medal – second place	2009 Harbin	Ice hockey

Gao Fujin
- Traditional Chinese: 高馥瑾
- Simplified Chinese: 高馥瑾
Transcriptions
Standard Mandarin
- Hanyu Pinyin: Gāo Fùjǐn

Gao Fujin (Chinese: 高 馥瑾; born 15 July 1984) is a Chinese ice hockey player and former member of the Chinese national team.

== Playing career ==
As a member of the Chinese national ice hockey team, Gao won bronze medals in the ice hockey tournaments at the Asian Winter Games in 2007 and 2011, and participated in seven IIHF Women's World Championships, including the Top Division tournaments in 2005, 2007, 2008, and 2009. She was part of the Chinese delegation at the 2010 Winter Olympics in Vancouver and competed in the women's ice hockey tournament.

With the Chinese national under-25 team, she won a silver medal in the women's ice hockey tournament at the 2009 Winter Universiade in her home city of Harbin.
