= Sang Hong =

Chinese ice hockey player

- Born: 9 February 1975 (age 50) Heilongjiang, China
- Height: 163 cm (5 ft 4 in)
- Weight: 59 kg (130 lb; 9 st 4 lb)
- Position: Forward
- Shot: Right
- National team: China
- Playing career: 1996–2007

Sang Hong (Chinese: 桑宏; pinyin: Sāng Hóng; born 9 February 1975) is a retired Chinese ice hockey player. She competed in the women's tournaments at the 1998 Winter Olympics and the 2002 Winter Olympics.

== Career statistics ==
Note: GP = Games played; G = Goals; A = Assists; Pts = Points; PIM = Penalty minutes;

				Regular season
Year	Team	Event	Result	GP	G	A	Pts	PIM
1997	China	WC	4th	5	2	1	3	2
1998	China	OG	4th	6	1	0	1	4
1999	China	WC	5th	5	4	1	5	2
2000	China	WC	6th	5	0	0	0	2
2001	China	WC	6th	5	1	0	1	2
2007	China	WC	6th	4	2	0	2	4
