= Yuki Togawa =

Japanese ice hockey player

Personal information
- Nationality: Japanese
- Born: 28 February 1978 (age 47); Hokkaido, Japan

Sport
- Sport: Ice hockey

Yuki Togawa (born 28 February 1978) is a Japanese ice hockey player. She competed in the women's tournament at the 1998 Winter Olympics.
