= South Korea women's national ice hockey team =

South Korea
- Association: Korea Ice Hockey Association
- Head coach: Kim Do-yun
- Assistants: Kim Tae-gyum
- Captain: Kim Se-lin
- Most games: Han Soo-jin (96)
- Top scorer: Park Jong-ah (53)
- Most points: Park Jong-ah (96)
- Team colors: Red, white, blue
- IIHF code: KOR

Ranking
- Current IIHF: 18 (3 June 2026)
- Highest IIHF: 16 (first in 2018)
- Lowest IIHF: 28 (first in 2010)

First international
- Kazakhstan 17–1 South Korea (Kangwon, South Korea; 30 January 1999)

Biggest win
- South Korea 20–0 Thailand (Sapporo, Japan; 18 February 2017)

Biggest defeat
- China 30–1 South Korea (Aomori, Japan; 31 January 2003); Japan 29–0 South Korea (Changchun, China; 29 January 2007)

World Championships
- Appearances: 19 (first in 2004)
- Best result: 17th (2018, 2023)

Asian Winter Games
- Appearances: 4 (first in 1999)
- Best result: 4th (1999)

Challenge Cup of Asia
- Appearances: 2 (first in 2011)
- Best result: (bronze) (2011)

International record (W–L–T)
- 65–114–0

The South Korean women's national ice hockey team (Korean: 대한민국 여자 아이스하키 국가대표팀; RR: Daehanmingug Yeoja Aiseuhaki Guggadaepyotim; recognized as Korea by IIHF)) is controlled by the Korea Ice Hockey Association (KIHA). In 2017, the team was promoted to Division I, Group B of the Ice Hockey Women's World Championship after winning the Division II, Group A tournament. As of 2022, the team was ranked 18th in the world.

The South Korean women's national team competed in the 2018 Pyeongchang Winter Olympics after being granted automatic entry as the host country by the International Ice Hockey Federation (IIHF). In an effort to boost their competitiveness for the Olympics, the program has recruited several North American players with Korean ancestry. In January 2018, it was announced that a unified Korean team would take part in the games, including players from North Korea. KIHA president Chung Mong-won hired Sarah Murray to coach the team.

A movie about the South Korean women's ice hockey team was released in South Korea in August 2016.

== Tournament record ==
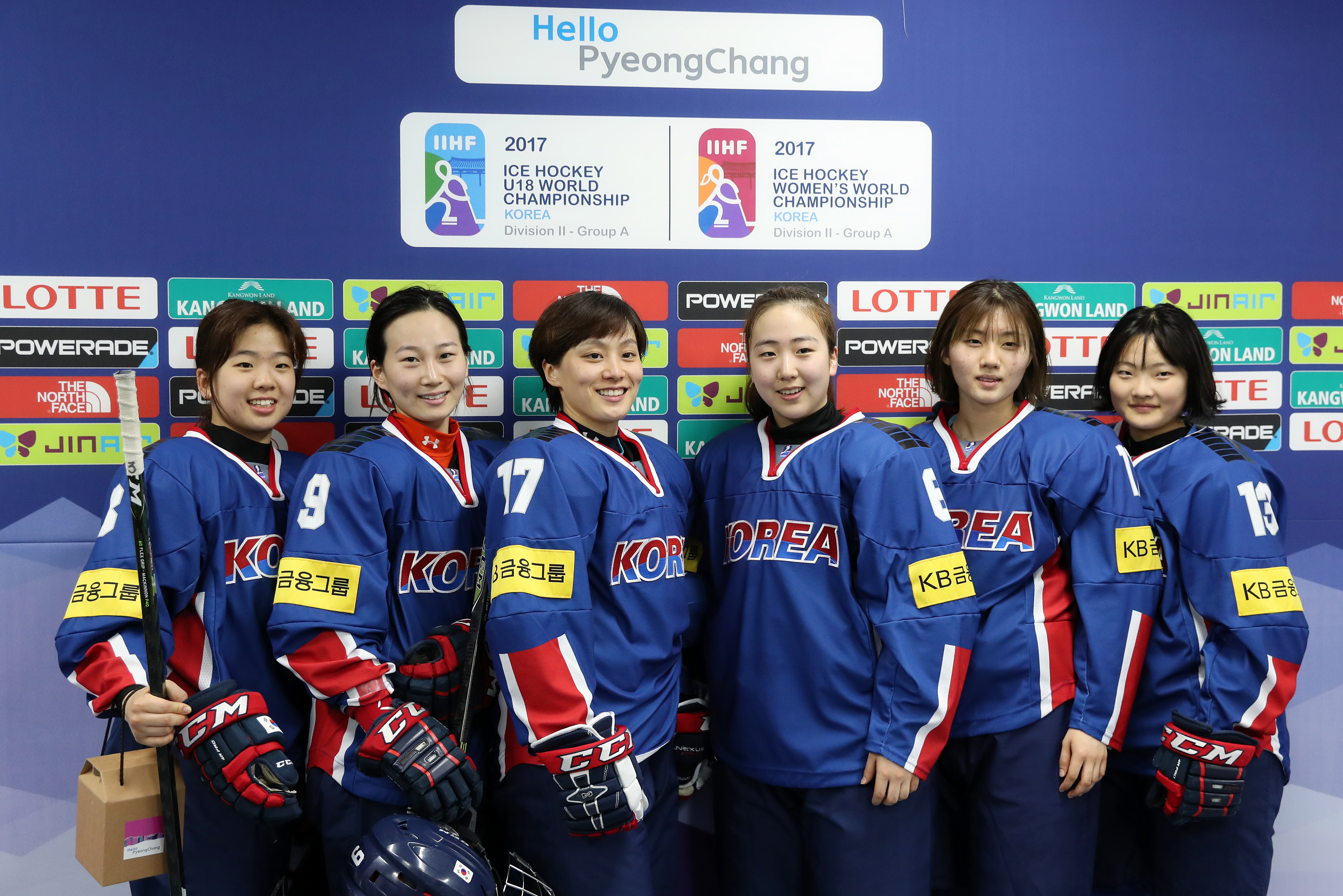
Members of the South Korean women's hockey team posing before their game against Australia at the 2017 IIHF Women's World Championship Division II. From left: Eom Su-yeon, Park Jong-ah, Han Soo-jin, Choi Yu-jung, Park Ye-eun, Lee Eun-ji

=== Olympic Games ===
- 2018 – Host country (as Unified Korea Team), Finished in 8th place

=== World Championships ===
In 2004 the South Korean women's hockey team was the first time involved in the World Championship competition.

- 2004 – Finished in 27th place (6th in Division III, Demoted to Division IV)
- 2005 – Finished in 27th place (1st in Division IV, Promoted to Division III)
- 2007 – Finished in 26th place (5th in Division III)
- 2008 – Finished in 28th place (6th in Division III, Demoted to Division IV)
- 2009 – Division IV canceled
- 2011 – Finished in 27th place (2nd in Division IV)
- 2012 – Finished in 28th place (3rd in Division IIB)
- 2013 – Finished in 27th place (1st in Division IIB, Promoted to Division IIA)
- 2014 – Finished in 23rd place (3rd in Division IIA)
- 2015 – Finished in 23rd place (3rd in Division IIA)
- 2016 – Finished in 22nd place (2nd in Division IIA)
- 2017 – Finished in 21st place (1st in Division IIA, Promoted to Division IB)
- 2018 – Finished in 17th place (2nd in Division IB)
- 2019 – Finished in 18th place (2nd in Division IB)
- 2020 – Cancelled due to the COVID-19 pandemic
- 2021 – Cancelled due to the COVID-19 pandemic
- 2022 – Finished in 20th place (5th in Division IB)
- 2023 – Finished in 17th place (1st in Division IB, Promoted to Division IA)
- 2024 – Finished in 16th place (6th in Division IA, Relegated to Division IB)
- 2025 – Finished in 21st place (5th in Division IB)
- 2026 – Finished in 20th place (4th in Division IB)

=== Asian Games ===
- 1999 – Finished in 4th place (from 4 teams)
- 2003 – Finished in 5th place (from 5 teams)
- 2007 – Finished in 5th place (from 5 teams)
- 2011 – Finished in 5th place (from 5 teams)
- 2017 – Finished in 4th place (from 6 teams)
- 2025 – Finished in 4th place (from 7 teams)

=== IIHF Asia Championship ===
- 2025 – Finished in 4th place
- 2026 – Finished in 4th place
- 2027 – Finished in 4th place

=== IIHF Challenge Cup of Asia ===
- 2011 – 3rd
- 2012 – 4th
- 2014 – 3rd

== All-time record against other nations ==
Last match update: 11 March 2022

Key
Positive balance (more Wins)
Neutral balance (Wins = Losses)
Negative balance (more Losses)

Team	GP	W	T	L	GF	GA
Iceland	5	5	0	0	28	5
South Africa	4	4	0	0	31	4
Croatia	4	4	0	0	26	3
Australia	5	4	0	1	16	10
Latvia	3	3	0	0	11	3
New Zealand	4	3	0	1	11	6
Romania	3	2	0	1	9	7
Thailand	1	1	0	0	20	0
Hong Kong	1	1	0	0	14	0
Slovenia	6	3	0	3	12	21
Spain	2	1	0	1	4	3
Italy	2	1	0	1	4	5
Germany	1	0	0	1	2	4
Denmark	1	0	0	1	1	4
Slovakia	1	0	0	1	1	7
Netherlands	3	1	0	2	6	10
Belgium	5	2	0	3	10	10
Austria	2	0	0	2	1	13
France	4	1	0	3	8	12
Great Britain	7	2	0	5	6	24
North Korea	7	2	0	5	9	35
Poland	9	3	0	6	27	26
Hungary	4	0	0	4	5	15
Switzerland	4	0	0	4	3	17
Sweden	5	0	0	5	2	33
Kazakhstan	17	6	0	11	22	91
China	11	1	0	10	9	107
Japan	11	0	0	11	2	139
Total	132	50	0	82	300	614

== Team ==
=== Current roster ===
Roster for the Group A tournament of the 2024 IIHF Women's World Championship Division I.

Head coach: Kim Do-yun
Assistant coaches: Han Jae Ik, Kim Geunho, Kim Taegyum

Player age on first day of tournament, 21 April 2024.

No.	Pos.	Name	Height	Weight	Birthdate	Team
1	G	Park Jongju	1.52 m (5 ft 0 in)	55 kg (121 lb)	17 February 1994 (aged 30)	(South Korea) Suwon City Hall
2	D	Song Heeoh	1.63 m (5 ft 4 in)	52 kg (115 lb)	1 March 2007 (aged 17)	(South Korea) Mokdong Hurricanes
3	F	Kang Sihyun	1.63 m (5 ft 4 in)	57 kg (126 lb)	13 January 2004 (aged 20)	(United States) Norwich Cadets
4	D	Park Minae	1.62 m (5 ft 4 in)	59 kg (130 lb)	26 April 2005 (aged 18)	(South Korea) Ice Beat
5	F	Lee Sojung	1.68 m (5 ft 6 in)	60 kg (130 lb)	8 March 2002 (aged 22)	(South Korea) Suwon City Hall
6	F	Kang Nara	1.60 m (5 ft 3 in)	55 kg (121 lb)	30 September 2002 (aged 21)	(South Korea) Suwon City Hall
7	D	Park Ye Eun – A	1.62 m (5 ft 4 in)	56 kg (123 lb)	28 May 1996 (aged 27)	(Canada) TMU Bold
8	D	Kim Selin	1.57 m (5 ft 2 in)	65 kg (143 lb)	3 April 2000 (aged 24)	(South Korea) Suwon City Hall
9	F	Park Jongah	1.61 m (5 ft 3 in)	56 kg (123 lb)	13 June 1996 (aged 27)	(South Korea) Suwon City Hall
10	F	Choi Jiyeon	1.58 m (5 ft 2 in)	60 kg (130 lb)	21 August 1998 (aged 25)	(South Korea) Suwon City Hall
11	D	Kim Dowon	1.58 m (5 ft 2 in)	55 kg (121 lb)	10 June 2004 (aged 19)	(South Korea) Ice Avengers
14	F	Song Yunha	1.67 m (5 ft 6 in)	62 kg (137 lb)	10 December 2003 (aged 20)	(South Korea) Suwon City Hall
15	D	Park Juyeon	1.71 m (5 ft 7 in)	60 kg (130 lb)	28 January 2008 (aged 16)	(South Korea) Zenith Frauen
16	F	Lee Eunji	1.71 m (5 ft 7 in)	63 kg (139 lb)	1 February 2005 (aged 19)	(South Korea) Ice Beat
17	F	Han Soojin – C	1.50 m (4 ft 11 in)	64 kg (141 lb)	22 September 1987 (aged 36)	(South Korea) Suwon City Hall
18	F	Han Yuan	1.63 m (5 ft 4 in)	55 kg (121 lb)	17 September 2008 (aged 15)	(Canada) Ontario Hockey Academy
19	F	Park Jiyoon – A	1.78 m (5 ft 10 in)	68 kg (150 lb)	3 September 2001 (aged 22)	(South Korea) Suwon City Hall
20	G	Cheon Hyoseo	1.70 m (5 ft 7 in)	58 kg (128 lb)	24 May 2006 (aged 17)	(Canada) North Shore Warriors
21	F	Im Danelle	1.62 m (5 ft 4 in)	63 kg (139 lb)	21 January 1993 (aged 31)	(South Korea) Ice Beat
22	F	Jung Siyun	1.58 m (5 ft 2 in)	58 kg (128 lb)	8 September 2000 (aged 23)	(South Korea) Suwon City Hall
23	D	Kim Taeyeon	1.63 m (5 ft 4 in)	63 kg (139 lb)	4 March 2006 (aged 18)	(Canada) Rothesay Netherwood
