= Qi Xueting =

Chinese ice hockey player and coach

- Born: 7 November 1986 (age 39) Harbin, Heilongjiang, China
- Height: 155 cm (5 ft 1 in)
- Weight: 59 kg (130 lb; 9 st 4 lb)
- Position: Defense
- Shot: Right
- Played for: KRS Vanke Rays; Strathmore Rockies; Team China (NSMs); Harbin Ice Hockey
- Current WCIHL coach: Shenzhen KRS
- National team: China
- Playing career: 2003–2021
- Coaching career: c. 2017–present
Medal record
Asian Winter Games
Bronze medal – third place	2011 Astana-Almaty	Ice hockey
Bronze medal – third place	2007 Changchun	Ice hockey
Universiade
Silver medal – second place	2009 Harbin	Ice hockey

Qi Xueting
- Traditional Chinese: 齊雪婷
- Simplified Chinese: 齐雪婷
Transcriptions
Standard Mandarin
- Hanyu Pinyin: Qí Xuětíng

Qi Xueting (Chinese: 齐雪婷; born 7 November 1986), also known by the Western name Snow Qi, is a Chinese ice hockey coach and retired defenseman. She is the head coach of Shenzhen Kunlun Red Star (Shenzhen KRS) in the Chinese Women's Ice Hockey League (WCIHL).

== Playing career ==
Qi was a member of the Chinese women's national ice hockey team during 2003 to 2015. During her time with the national team, she won bronze medals at the Asian Winter Games in 2007 and 2011, a silver medal at the 2009 Winter Universiade, and represented China in the women's ice hockey tournament at the 2010 Winter Olympics.

Qi was last active as a player with the KRS Vanke Rays (renamed Shenzhen KRS in 2022) in the Zhenskaya Hockey League (ZhHL) during the 2020–21 ZhHL season.

== Coaching career ==
Qi served as assistant coach to the Chinese women's national team for the IIHF Women's World Championship Division 1B tournaments in 2018 and 2019.

She was named head coach of Shenzhen KRS ahead of the 2024–25 WCIHL season.
