= Olga Kryukova =

Kazakhstani ice hockey player

Personal information
- Nationality: Kazakhstani
- Born: 27 November 1974 (age 51) Alma-Ata, Kazakh SSR, Soviet Union

Sport
- Sport: Ice hockey

Olga Kryukova (Ольга Александровна Крюкова, born 27 November 1974) is a Kazakhstani ice hockey player. She competed in the women's tournament at the 2002 Winter Olympics.
