= Yurie Adachi =

Japanese ice hockey player (born 1985)

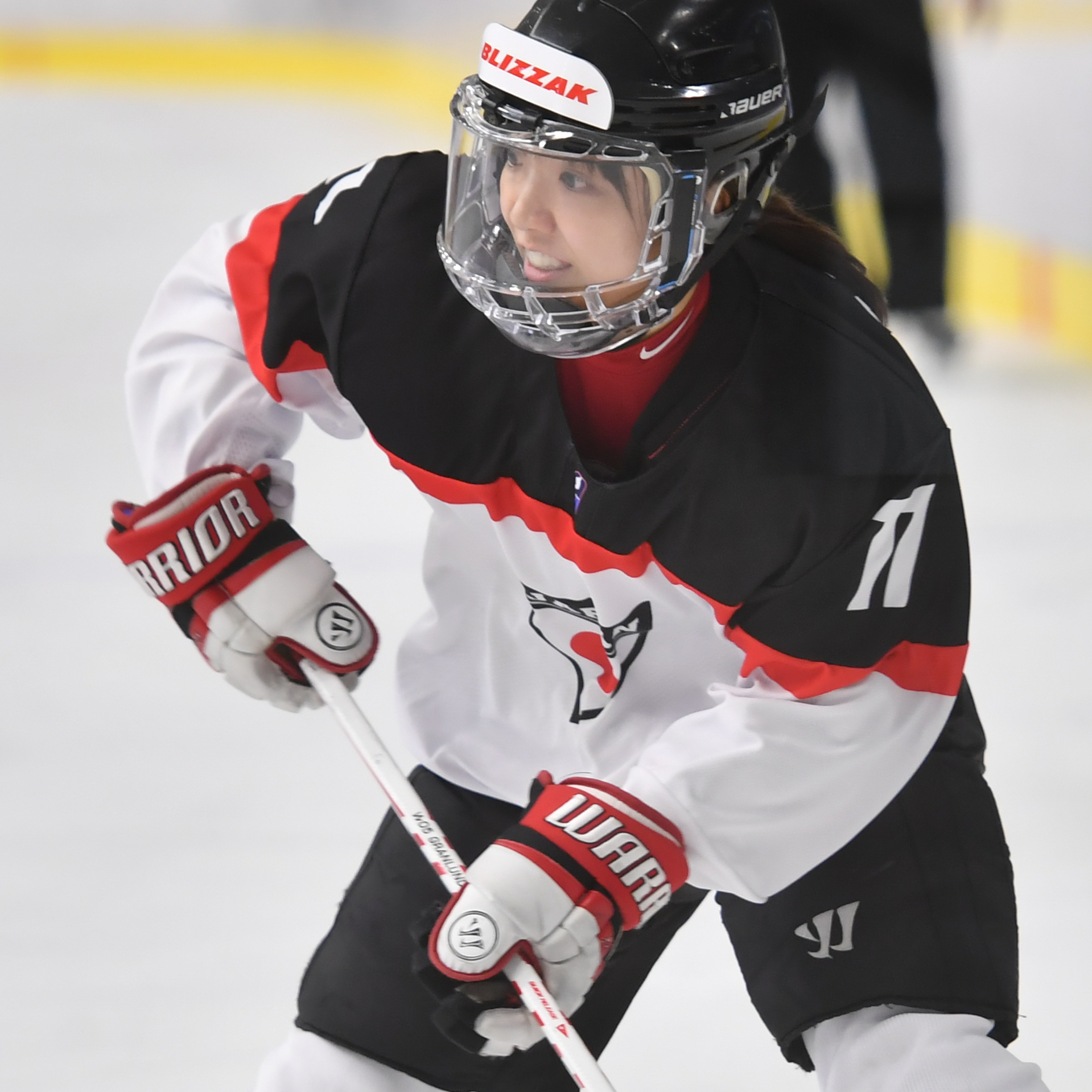
- Born: April 26, 1985 (age 41)
- Height: 5 ft 1 in (155 cm)
- Weight: 112 lb (51 kg; 8 st 0 lb)
- Position: Forward
- Shot: Left
- J-League team: Seibu Princess Rabbits
- National team: Japan
- Playing career: 2003–2018
Medal record
Asian Games
Silver medal – second place	2007 Changchun	Team
Silver medal – second place	2011 Astana-Almaty	Team

Yurie Adachi (足立 友里恵, Adachi Yurie; born April 26, 1985) is a Japanese ice hockey player. She has played for Japan in the World Women's Championship Division 1 for two years. In 2008, she played for Japan again, this time in the Top Division.

Adachi competed at both the 2014 and the 2018 Winter Olympics.

== Statistics ==
Year	Division	GP	G	A	PTS	PIM	+/-	GWG	PPG	SHG	SOG	S%
2003	Div 1	5	0	0	0	0	−1	0	0	0	N/A	0
2007	Div 1	5	6	4	10	4	+7	0	2	1	16	37.50
2008	WW	4	2	1	3	0	0	0	2	0	3	66.67
2009	WW	4	0	2	2	2	+2	0	0	0	12	0
Total	Pool A & WW	8	2	3	5	2	+2	0	2	0	15	13.33
Total	Div 1	10	6	4	10	4	+6	0	2	1	N/A	N/A
