= Olga Potapova =

Kazakhstani ice hockey player

Personal information
- Nationality: Kazakhstani
- Born: 16 December 1976 (age 49) Alma-Ata, Kazakh SSR, Soviet Union

Sport
- Sport: Ice hockey

Olga Potapova (Ольга Владимировна Потапова, born 16 December 1976) is a Kazakhstani ice hockey player. She competed in the women's tournament at the 2002 Winter Olympics.
