= Yōko Kondō (ice hockey) =

Japanese ice hockey player

Yoko Kondo
- Born: 13 February 1979 (age 46); Hachinohe, Japan
- Height: 5 ft 5 in (165 cm)
- Weight: 130 lb (59 kg; 9 st 4 lb)
- Position: Defence
- Shoots: Right
- JWHL team: Seibu Princess Rabbits
- National team: Japan
- Playing career: 1995–present

Yoko Kondo (近藤 陽子, Kondō Yōko; born February 13, 1979) is a Japanese ice hockey player, and is considered one of her country's best defenseman. She is the only player to qualify for both the 1998 and 2014 Winter Olympics. Kondo was the oldest player on the 2014 team, for which she switched to the forward position.

== Biography ==
Yoko Kondo was born on February 13, 1979, in Hachinohe, Aomori Prefecture. She began playing ice hockey at age six in Aomori, largely because her older brother played the game and she wanted to follow him. She began playing ice hockey professionally in 1995, and qualified for Japan's first Olympic women's ice hockey team during the 1998 Winter Olympics. Kondo felt she personally lacked physical strength to compete with foreign players, and that the team was not playing at a level capable of winning due to the lack of clear goals and a consistent training program. She believed if the team continued to improve, they could eventually qualify for the 2014 Winter Olympics.

Kondo participated in four Division I International Ice Hockey Federation world championship tournaments between 2001 and 2013, with Japan placing second in 2001 and 2005, first in 2007, and fourth in 2013. She played as a defenseman with the Seibu Princess Rabbits in the Women's Japan Ice Hockey League, while also employed professionally as an office worker. In January 2014, Ilzuka Yuji, head coach of the Japan women's national ice hockey team, played Kondo as a forward in a friendly match and found her speed, body size and powerful shots suited her for the role. Yuji decided to play Kondo as forward in the 2014 Winter Olympics, although she only started seriously training in the position in December 2013.

At age 35, Kondo was the oldest player on the Japan's 2014 Olympic team, and the only one with past Olympic experience. In contrast to 1998, Kondo felt the team was better prepared to compete and had a clear strategy to win.
