= Tomoko Sakagami =

Japanese ice hockey player

- Born: October 18, 1983 (age 42) Tomakomai, Japan
- Height: 5 ft 4 in (163 cm)
- Weight: 128 lb (58 kg; 9 st 2 lb)
- Position: Forward
- Shoots: Right
- National team: Japan

Tomoko Sakagami (坂上 智子) (born October 18, 1983 in Tomakomai, Japan) is a Japanese ice hockey forward and defender.

== International career ==
Sakagami was selected for the Japan women's national ice hockey team in the 2014 Winter Olympics. She played in all five games.

Sakagami also played for Japan in the qualifying events for the 2014, 2010 and 2006 Winter Olympics.

As of 2015, Sakagami has also appeared for Japan at eight IIHF Women's World Championships, with the first in 2001.

== Career statistics ==
=== International career ===
Through 2014–15 season

Year	Team	Event	GP	G	A	Pts	PIM
2001	Japan	WW DI	4	0	0	0	2
2003	Japan	WW DI	5	0	3	3	4
2004	Japan	Oly Q	2	0	1	1	0
2005	Japan	WW DI	5	1	3	4	4
2007	Japan	WW DI	5	1	3	4	4
2008	Japan	WW	4	0	1	1	6
2008	Japan	Oly Q	3	1	0	1	0
2009	Japan	WW	4	3	0	3	2
2012	Japan	WW DIA	5	1	3	4	8
2013	Japan	OlyQ	3	1	2	3	2
2013	Japan	WW DIA	5	2	3	5	2
2014	Japan	Oly	5	0	0	0	2
