= Huang Haijing =

Chinese ice hockey player

Personal information
- Native name: 黄海静
- Nationality: Chinese
- Born: July 3, 1988 (age 36); Harbin, Heilongjiang, China

Sport
- Sport: Ice hockey

Huang Haijing (simplified Chinese: 黄海静; traditional Chinese: 黃海靜; pinyin: Huáng Hǎijìng; born July 3, 1988) is a Chinese female ice hockey player. She is a member of the China women's national ice hockey team. She competed for China at the 2010 Winter Olympics. The team finished 7th out of 8 teams.
