= Sun Rui (ice hockey) =

Chinese ice hockey player and coach

- Born: 14 May 1982 (age 44) Harbin, Heilongjiang, China
- Height: 171 cm (5 ft 7 in)
- Weight: 61 kg (134 lb; 9 st 8 lb)
- Position: Forward
- Shot: Left
- Played for: Edmonton Chimos; Espoo Blues; Harbin Ice Hockey
- National team: China
- Playing career: 1998–2015
Medal record
Asian Winter Games
Gold medal – first place	1999 Gangwon	Ice hockey
Bronze medal – third place	2003 Aomori	Ice hockey
Bronze medal – third place	2007 Changchun	Ice hockey
Bronze medal – third place	2011 Almaty	Ice hockey
Universiade
Silver medal – second place	2009 Harbin	Ice hockey

Sun Rui
- Traditional Chinese: 孫銳
- Simplified Chinese: 孙锐
Transcriptions
Standard Mandarin
- Hanyu Pinyin: Sūn Ruì

Sun Rui (Chinese: 孙锐; born 14 May 1982), also known by the Western name Sunny Sun, is a Chinese ice hockey coach and retired forward. She has previously served as assistant coach of the Chinese women's national team and the KRS Vanke Rays in the Zhenskaya Hockey League (ZhHL).

Sun was a member of the Chinese national team during 1998 to 2015 and competed with the team in many international tournaments, including in the women's ice hockey tournament at the 2010 Winter Olympics.
