= 2024 IIHF Women's World Championship rosters =

Team rosters of the IIHF Women's World Championship

Each team's roster consisted of at least 15 skaters (forwards, and defencemen) and two goaltenders, and at most 20 skaters and three goaltenders. All ten participating nations, through the confirmation of their respective national associations, had to submit a roster by the first IIHF directorate.

Ages are as of 3 April 2024, the first day of the tournament.

== Group A ==
=== Canada ===
The roster was announced on 7 March 2024.

Head coach: Troy Ryan

No.	Pos.	Name	Height	Weight	Birthdate	Team
3	D	Jocelyne Larocque	1.68 m (5 ft 6 in)	66 kg (146 lb)	19 May 1988 (aged 35)	(Canada) PWHL Toronto
7	F	Laura Stacey	1.78 m (5 ft 10 in)	71 kg (157 lb)	5 May 1994 (aged 29)	(Canada) PWHL Montreal
10	F	Sarah Fillier	1.65 m (5 ft 5 in)	65 kg (143 lb)	9 June 2000 (aged 23)	(United States) Princeton Tigers
14	D	Renata Fast – A	1.68 m (5 ft 6 in)	65 kg (143 lb)	6 October 1994 (aged 29)	(Canada) PWHL Toronto
17	D	Ella Shelton	1.73 m (5 ft 8 in)	80 kg (180 lb)	19 January 1998 (aged 26)	(United States) PWHL New York
19	F	Brianne Jenner	1.75 m (5 ft 9 in)	71 kg (157 lb)	4 May 1991 (aged 32)	(Canada) PWHL Ottawa
20	F	Sarah Nurse	1.71 m (5 ft 7 in)	72 kg (159 lb)	4 January 1995 (aged 29)	(Canada) PWHL Toronto
21	D	Ashton Bell	1.73 m (5 ft 8 in)	73 kg (161 lb)	7 December 1999 (aged 24)	(Canada) PWHL Ottawa
23	D	Erin Ambrose	1.65 m (5 ft 5 in)	64 kg (141 lb)	30 April 1994 (aged 29)	(Canada) PWHL Montreal
24	F	Natalie Spooner	1.78 m (5 ft 10 in)	77 kg (170 lb)	17 October 1990 (aged 33)	(Canada) PWHL Toronto
25	D	Jaime Bourbonnais	1.70 m (5 ft 7 in)	57 kg (126 lb)	9 September 1999 (aged 24)	(United States) PWHL New York
26	F	Emily Clark	1.70 m (5 ft 7 in)	70 kg (150 lb)	28 November 1995 (aged 28)	(Canada) PWHL Ottawa
27	F	Emma Maltais	1.60 m (5 ft 3 in)	66 kg (146 lb)	4 November 1999 (aged 24)	(Canada) PWHL Toronto
29	F	Marie-Philip Poulin – C	1.70 m (5 ft 7 in)	73 kg (161 lb)	28 March 1991 (aged 33)	(Canada) PWHL Montreal
35	G	Ann-Renée Desbiens	1.75 m (5 ft 9 in)	73 kg (161 lb)	10 April 1994 (aged 29)	(Canada) PWHL Montreal
38	G	Emerance Maschmeyer	1.68 m (5 ft 6 in)	64 kg (141 lb)	5 October 1994 (aged 29)	(Canada) PWHL Ottawa
40	F	Blayre Turnbull – A	1.70 m (5 ft 7 in)	68 kg (150 lb)	15 July 1993 (aged 30)	(Canada) PWHL Toronto
43	F	Kristin O'Neill	1.63 m (5 ft 4 in)	57 kg (126 lb)	30 March 1998 (aged 26)	(Canada) PWHL Montreal
47	F	Jamie Lee Rattray	1.70 m (5 ft 7 in)	70 kg (150 lb)	30 September 1992 (aged 31)	(United States) PWHL Boston
50	G	Kristen Campbell	1.78 m (5 ft 10 in)	82 kg (181 lb)	30 November 1997 (aged 26)	(Canada) PWHL Toronto
61	D	Nicole Gosling	1.78 m (5 ft 10 in)	64 kg (141 lb)	21 April 2002 (aged 21)	(United States) Clarkson Golden Knights
88	F	Julia Gosling	1.78 m (5 ft 10 in)	74 kg (163 lb)	21 February 2001 (aged 23)	(United States) St. Lawrence Saints
92	F	Danielle Serdachny	1.74 m (5 ft 9 in)	71 kg (157 lb)	12 May 2001 (aged 22)	(United States) Colgate Raiders

=== Czechia ===
The roster was announced on 13 March 2024.

Head coach: (Canada) Carla MacLeod

No.	Pos.	Name	Height	Weight	Birthdate	Team
1	G	Viktorie Švejdová	1.68 m (5 ft 6 in)	68 kg (150 lb)	24 June 2002 (aged 21)	(Sweden) SDE Hockey
2	D	Aneta Tejralová – C	1.64 m (5 ft 5 in)	53 kg (117 lb)	4 January 1996 (aged 28)	(Canada) PWHL Ottawa
3	F	Adéla Šapovalivová	1.61 m (5 ft 3 in)	58 kg (128 lb)	17 May 2006 (aged 17)	(Sweden) MoDo Hockey
4	D	Daniela Pejšová	1.75 m (5 ft 9 in)	70 kg (150 lb)	14 August 2002 (aged 21)	(Sweden) Luleå HF
5	F	Anežka Čabelová	1.63 m (5 ft 4 in)	60 kg (130 lb)	21 August 2006 (aged 17)	(Canada) RINK Hockey Academy Kelowna
8	F	Tereza Pištěková	1.71 m (5 ft 7 in)	60 kg (130 lb)	3 June 2005 (aged 18)	(Finland) HPK Naiset
10	F	Denisa Křížová – A	1.65 m (5 ft 5 in)	64 kg (141 lb)	3 November 1994 (aged 29)	(United States) PWHL Minnesota
12	F	Klára Hymlárová	1.63 m (5 ft 4 in)	67 kg (148 lb)	27 February 1999 (aged 25)	(United States) St. Cloud State Huskies
13	D	Klára Jandušíková	1.65 m (5 ft 5 in)	62 kg (137 lb)	29 December 2001 (aged 22)	(United States) Colby Mules
15	D	Andrea Trnková	1.73 m (5 ft 8 in)	72 kg (159 lb)	3 March 2004 (aged 20)	(United States) RPI Engineers
16	F	Kateřina Mrázová	1.63 m (5 ft 4 in)	61 kg (134 lb)	19 October 1992 (aged 31)	(Canada) PWHL Ottawa
17	D	Karolína Kosinová	1.72 m (5 ft 8 in)	75 kg (165 lb)	21 May 1998 (aged 25)	(Sweden) SDE Hockey
18	F	Michaela Pejzlová – A	1.69 m (5 ft 7 in)	62 kg (137 lb)	4 June 1997 (aged 26)	(Finland) IFK Helsinki
19	F	Natálie Mlýnková	1.61 m (5 ft 3 in)	61 kg (134 lb)	24 May 2001 (aged 22)	(United States) Vermont Catamounts
21	F	Tereza Vanišová	1.69 m (5 ft 7 in)	64 kg (141 lb)	30 January 1996 (aged 28)	(Canada) PWHL Ottawa
22	F	Tereza Plosová	1.77 m (5 ft 10 in)	64 kg (141 lb)	5 July 2006 (aged 17)	(Sweden) Djurgårdens IF
23	F	Anna Kalová	1.70 m (5 ft 7 in)	70 kg (150 lb)	16 March 2003 (aged 21)	(Finland) Rovaniemen Kiekko
24	D	Sára Čajanová	1.70 m (5 ft 7 in)	63 kg (139 lb)	10 December 2002 (aged 21)	(Sweden) Brynäs IF
26	F	Vendula Přibylová	1.71 m (5 ft 7 in)	78 kg (172 lb)	23 March 1996 (aged 28)	(Sweden) MoDo Hockey
27	D	Tereza Radová	1.76 m (5 ft 9 in)	74 kg (163 lb)	22 November 2001 (aged 22)	(Sweden) Leksands IF
28	F	Noemi Neubauerová	1.73 m (5 ft 8 in)	69 kg (152 lb)	15 December 1999 (aged 24)	(Sweden) Brynäs IF
29	G	Klára Peslarová	1.64 m (5 ft 5 in)	63 kg (139 lb)	23 November 1996 (aged 27)	(Sweden) Brynäs IF
31	G	Blanka Škodová	1.77 m (5 ft 10 in)	68 kg (150 lb)	1 October 1997 (aged 26)	(Sweden) AIK Stockholm

=== Finland ===
The roster was announced on 11 March 2024.

Head coach: Juuso Toivola

No.	Pos.	Name	Height	Weight	Birthdate	Team
1	G	Sanni Ahola	1.71 m (5 ft 7 in)	81 kg (179 lb)	3 June 2000 (aged 23)	(United States) St. Cloud State Huskies
5	D	Siiri Yrjölä	1.66 m (5 ft 5 in)	68 kg (150 lb)	8 September 2004 (aged 19)	(Finland) HIFK Helsinki
6	D	Jenni Hiirikoski – C	1.62 m (5 ft 4 in)	62 kg (137 lb)	30 March 1987 (aged 37)	(Sweden) Luleå HF
7	D	Sanni Rantala	1.73 m (5 ft 8 in)	63 kg (139 lb)	8 July 2002 (aged 21)	(Finland) KalPa Kuopio
8	D	Eve Savander	1.68 m (5 ft 6 in)	68 kg (150 lb)	2 September 1998 (aged 25)	(Sweden) MoDo Hockey
9	D	Nelli Laitinen	1.69 m (5 ft 7 in)	62 kg (137 lb)	29 April 2002 (aged 21)	(United States) Minnesota Golden Gophers
10	F	Elisa Holopainen	1.66 m (5 ft 5 in)	58 kg (128 lb)	27 December 2001 (aged 22)	(Finland) KalPa Kuopio
12	F	Sanni Vanhanen	1.68 m (5 ft 6 in)	62 kg (137 lb)	1 July 2005 (aged 18)	(Finland) HIFK Helsinki
14	D	Krista Parkkonen	1.68 m (5 ft 6 in)	64 kg (141 lb)	25 June 2002 (aged 21)	(United States) Vermont Catamounts
16	F	Petra Nieminen	1.69 m (5 ft 7 in)	70 kg (150 lb)	4 May 1999 (aged 24)	(Sweden) Luleå HF
20	F	Anna-Kaisa Antti-Roiko	1.68 m (5 ft 6 in)	62 kg (137 lb)	21 May 2004 (aged 19)	(Finland) Kärpät Oulu
22	F	Julia Schalin	1.60 m (5 ft 3 in)	60 kg (130 lb)	31 August 2005 (aged 18)	(Finland) Kiekko-Espoo
24	F	Viivi Vainikka	1.66 m (5 ft 5 in)	67 kg (148 lb)	23 December 2001 (aged 22)	(Sweden) Luleå HF
28	F	Jenniina Nylund	1.71 m (5 ft 7 in)	63 kg (139 lb)	18 June 1999 (aged 24)	(Sweden) Brynäs IF
31	G	Tiia Pajarinen	1.65 m (5 ft 5 in)	69 kg (152 lb)	17 April 1998 (aged 25)	(Finland) Kiekko-Espoo
32	F	Emilia Vesa	1.77 m (5 ft 10 in)	66 kg (146 lb)	3 January 2001 (aged 23)	(Sweden) Frölunda HC
33	F	Michelle Karvinen – A	1.67 m (5 ft 6 in)	65 kg (143 lb)	27 March 1990 (aged 34)	(Sweden) Frölunda HC
34	F	Sofianna Sundelin	1.69 m (5 ft 7 in)	57 kg (126 lb)	13 January 2003 (aged 21)	(United States) St. Cloud State Huskies
36	G	Anni Keisala	1.75 m (5 ft 9 in)	80 kg (180 lb)	5 April 1997 (aged 26)	(Sweden) HV71
40	F	Noora Tulus – A	1.65 m (5 ft 5 in)	62 kg (137 lb)	15 August 1995 (aged 28)	(Sweden) Luleå HF
77	F	Susanna Tapani	1.77 m (5 ft 10 in)	68 kg (150 lb)	2 March 1993 (aged 31)	(United States) PWHL Boston
88	D	Ronja Savolainen	1.77 m (5 ft 10 in)	76 kg (168 lb)	29 November 1997 (aged 26)	(Sweden) Luleå HF
91	F	Julia Liikala	1.66 m (5 ft 5 in)	64 kg (141 lb)	20 March 2001 (aged 23)	(Finland) HIFK Helsinki

=== Switzerland ===
The roster was announced on 5 March 2024.

Head coach: Colin Muller

No.	Pos.	Name	Height	Weight	Birthdate	Team
2	D	Annic Büchi	1.71 m (5 ft 7 in)	68 kg (150 lb)	2 April 2005 (aged 19)	(Switzerland) EV Zug
7	F	Lara Stalder – C	1.67 m (5 ft 6 in)	63 kg (139 lb)	15 May 1994 (aged 29)	(Switzerland) EV Zug
8	F	Kaleigh Quennec – A	1.72 m (5 ft 8 in)	79 kg (174 lb)	15 February 1998 (aged 26)	(Canada) Montreal Carabins
10	D	Janine Hauser	1.70 m (5 ft 7 in)	73 kg (161 lb)	6 May 2001 (aged 22)	(Switzerland) HC Davos
11	F	Laura Zimmermann	1.63 m (5 ft 4 in)	73 kg (161 lb)	5 April 2003 (aged 20)	(United States) St. Cloud State Huskies
13	F	Ivana Wey	1.72 m (5 ft 8 in)	56 kg (123 lb)	4 February 2006 (aged 18)	(Switzerland) EV Zug
16	D	Nicole Vallario	1.66 m (5 ft 5 in)	71 kg (157 lb)	30 August 2001 (aged 22)	(United States) St. Thomas Tommies
17	D	Lara Christen	1.63 m (5 ft 4 in)	64 kg (141 lb)	2 October 2002 (aged 21)	(Switzerland) SC Bern
18	D	Stefanie Wetli	1.73 m (5 ft 8 in)	71 kg (157 lb)	4 February 2000 (aged 24)	(Switzerland) HC Davos
19	F	Emma Ingold	1.71 m (5 ft 7 in)	62 kg (137 lb)	12 August 2002 (aged 21)	(Switzerland) SC Bern
20	G	Andrea Brändli	1.69 m (5 ft 7 in)	75 kg (165 lb)	5 June 1997 (aged 26)	(Sweden) MoDo Hockey
21	F	Rahel Enzler	1.63 m (5 ft 4 in)	66 kg (146 lb)	30 July 2000 (aged 23)	(United States) Maine Black Bears
22	F	Sinja Leemann	1.68 m (5 ft 6 in)	62 kg (137 lb)	19 April 2002 (aged 21)	(Switzerland) GCK/ZSC Lions
24	F	Noemi Ryhner	1.65 m (5 ft 5 in)	62 kg (137 lb)	24 April 2000 (aged 23)	(Switzerland) EV Zug
25	F	Alina Müller – A	1.67 m (5 ft 6 in)	63 kg (139 lb)	12 March 1998 (aged 26)	(United States) PWHL Boston
26	F	Naemi Herzig	1.70 m (5 ft 7 in)	60 kg (130 lb)	21 March 2007 (aged 17)	(Switzerland) EV Zug
28	F	Alina Marti	1.67 m (5 ft 6 in)	67 kg (148 lb)	23 April 2004 (aged 19)	(Switzerland) GCK/ZSC Lions
29	G	Saskia Maurer	1.66 m (5 ft 5 in)	63 kg (139 lb)	29 July 2001 (aged 22)	(Switzerland) SC Bern
40	G	Alexandra Lehmann	1.79 m (5 ft 10 in)	85 kg (187 lb)	21 February 2000 (aged 24)	(Switzerland) SC Bern
53	F	Vanessa Schaefer	1.63 m (5 ft 4 in)	51 kg (112 lb)	21 March 2005 (aged 19)	(Switzerland) GCK/ZSC Lions
68	F	Leoni Balzer	1.65 m (5 ft 5 in)	60 kg (130 lb)	18 January 2006 (aged 18)	(Switzerland) HC Davos
82	D	Alessia Baechler	1.74 m (5 ft 9 in)	68 kg (150 lb)	7 September 2005 (aged 18)	(Switzerland) GCK/ZSC Lions
87	F	Cindy Joray	1.66 m (5 ft 5 in)	59 kg (130 lb)	8 June 1993 (aged 30)	(Switzerland) SC Bern
94	D	Alena Lynn Rossel	1.69 m (5 ft 7 in)	58 kg (128 lb)	8 June 2006 (aged 17)	(Switzerland) SC Bern

=== United States ===
The roster was announced on 31 March 2024.

Head coach: John Wroblewski

No.	Pos.	Name	Height	Weight	Birthdate	Team
3	D	Cayla Barnes	1.57 m (5 ft 2 in)	63 kg (139 lb)	7 January 1999 (aged 25)	(United States) Ohio State Buckeyes
4	D	Caroline Harvey	1.70 m (5 ft 7 in)	66 kg (146 lb)	14 October 2002 (aged 21)	(United States) Wisconsin Badgers
5	D	Megan Keller – A	1.80 m (5 ft 11 in)	75 kg (165 lb)	1 May 1996 (aged 27)	(United States) PWHL Boston
6	D	Rory Guilday	1.78 m (5 ft 10 in)	73 kg (161 lb)	7 September 2002 (aged 21)	(United States) Cornell Big Red
7	F	Lacey Eden	1.73 m (5 ft 8 in)	68 kg (150 lb)	2 May 2002 (aged 21)	(United States) Wisconsin Badgers
8	D	Haley Winn	1.65 m (5 ft 5 in)	68 kg (150 lb)	14 July 2003 (aged 20)	(United States) Clarkson Golden Knights
9	F	Kirsten Simms	1.65 m (5 ft 5 in)	68 kg (150 lb)	31 August 2004 (aged 19)	(United States) Wisconsin Badgers
12	F	Kelly Pannek	1.73 m (5 ft 8 in)	75 kg (165 lb)	29 December 1995 (aged 28)	(United States) PWHL Minnesota
14	F	Laila Edwards	1.88 m (6 ft 2 in)	86 kg (190 lb)	25 January 2004 (aged 20)	(United States) Wisconsin Badgers
15	D	Savannah Harmon	1.60 m (5 ft 3 in)	67 kg (148 lb)	27 October 1995 (aged 28)	(Canada) PWHL Ottawa
16	F	Hayley Scamurra	1.73 m (5 ft 8 in)	73 kg (161 lb)	14 December 1994 (aged 29)	(Canada) PWHL Ottawa
17	F	Britta Curl	1.75 m (5 ft 9 in)	72 kg (159 lb)	20 March 2000 (aged 24)	(United States) Wisconsin Badgers
21	F	Hilary Knight – C	1.80 m (5 ft 11 in)	78 kg (172 lb)	12 July 1989 (aged 34)	(United States) PWHL Boston
22	F	Tessa Janecke	1.73 m (5 ft 8 in)	72 kg (159 lb)	12 May 2004 (aged 19)	(United States) Penn State Nittany Lions
23	F	Hannah Bilka	1.65 m (5 ft 5 in)	59 kg (130 lb)	24 March 2001 (aged 23)	(United States) Ohio State Buckeyes
24	F	Joy Dunne	1.81 m (5 ft 11 in)	82 kg (181 lb)	13 June 2005 (aged 18)	(United States) Ohio State Buckeyes
25	F	Alex Carpenter – A	1.70 m (5 ft 7 in)	70 kg (150 lb)	13 April 1994 (aged 29)	(United States) PWHL New York
26	F	Kendall Coyne Schofield	1.57 m (5 ft 2 in)	57 kg (126 lb)	25 May 1992 (aged 31)	(United States) PWHL Minnesota
27	F	Taylor Heise	1.78 m (5 ft 10 in)	66 kg (146 lb)	17 March 2000 (aged 24)	(United States) PWHL Minnesota
29	G	Nicole Hensley	1.68 m (5 ft 6 in)	70 kg (150 lb)	23 June 1994 (aged 29)	(United States) PWHL Minnesota
31	G	Aerin Frankel	1.65 m (5 ft 5 in)	63 kg (139 lb)	24 May 1999 (aged 24)	(United States) PWHL Boston
33	G	Gwyneth Philips	1.68 m (5 ft 6 in)	79 kg (174 lb)	17 September 2000 (aged 23)	(United States) Northeastern Huskies
37	F	Abbey Murphy	1.65 m (5 ft 5 in)	66 kg (146 lb)	14 April 2002 (aged 21)	(United States) Minnesota Golden Gophers

== Group B ==
=== China ===
The roster was published on 2 March 2024.

Head coach: (Canada) Scott Spencer

No.	Pos.	Name	Height	Weight	Birthdate	Team
2	D	Yu Baiwei – C	1.66 m (5 ft 5 in)	66 kg (146 lb)	17 July 1988 (aged 35)	(China) Kunlun Red Star
7	F	Zhang Mengying – A	1.70 m (5 ft 7 in)	68 kg (150 lb)	22 December 1993 (aged 30)	(China) Beijing
9	F	Kong Minghui	1.65 m (5 ft 5 in)	56 kg (123 lb)	21 April 1992 (aged 31)	(China) Harbin
10	F	Wu Sijia	1.66 m (5 ft 5 in)	55 kg (121 lb)	19 May 2007 (aged 16)	(China) Beijing
12	D	Tian Yuwei	1.67 m (5 ft 6 in)	65 kg (143 lb)	18 May 2004 (aged 19)	(China) Harbin
13	D	Zhao Qinan – A	1.71 m (5 ft 7 in)	60 kg (130 lb)	29 August 1997 (aged 26)	(China) Kunlun Red Star
19	D	Du Sijia	1.66 m (5 ft 5 in)	58 kg (128 lb)	7 August 2002 (aged 21)	(China) Beijing
21	D	Liu Siyang	1.68 m (5 ft 6 in)	63 kg (139 lb)	21 December 1995 (aged 28)	(China) Qiqihar
22	F	Meng Fangcong	1.65 m (5 ft 5 in)	57 kg (126 lb)	5 May 2007 (aged 16)	(China) Sichuan
23	F	Fang Xin	1.70 m (5 ft 7 in)	57 kg (126 lb)	10 May 1994 (aged 29)	(China) Kunlun Red Star
24	F	Wang Jiaxin	1.63 m (5 ft 4 in)	56 kg (123 lb)	1 March 2006 (aged 18)	(China) Sichuan
25	G	Wei Xueqin	1.66 m (5 ft 5 in)	62 kg (137 lb)	10 September 2000 (aged 23)	(China) Sichuan
26	F	Guan Yingying	1.66 m (5 ft 5 in)	62 kg (137 lb)	13 September 1995 (aged 28)	(China) Qiqihar
28	F	Yang Jinglei	1.72 m (5 ft 8 in)	62 kg (137 lb)	28 July 2005 (aged 18)	(China) Harbin
29	G	Zhan Jiahui	1.75 m (5 ft 9 in)	75 kg (165 lb)	4 April 2006 (aged 17)	(United States) Hill-Murray School
30	G	Wang Yuqing	1.69 m (5 ft 7 in)	58 kg (128 lb)	6 May 1994 (aged 29)	(China) Kunlun Red Star
66	F	Li Qianhua	1.65 m (5 ft 5 in)	65 kg (143 lb)	6 June 2002 (aged 21)	(China) Hebei
86	F	Zhao Ziyu	1.73 m (5 ft 8 in)	60 kg (130 lb)	16 May 2007 (aged 16)	(China) Sichuan
87	F	Wang Yifan	1.72 m (5 ft 8 in)	60 kg (130 lb)	21 March 2008 (aged 16)	(China) Sichuan
93	D	Liu Zhixin	1.79 m (5 ft 10 in)	78 kg (172 lb)	25 April 1993 (aged 30)	(China) Kunlun Red Star
94	F	Wen Lu	1.60 m (5 ft 3 in)	58 kg (128 lb)	21 April 1994 (aged 29)	(China) Kunlun Red Star
97	F	Qu Yue	1.73 m (5 ft 8 in)	65 kg (143 lb)	8 January 2004 (aged 20)	(China) Harbin
98	F	Zhu Rui	1.62 m (5 ft 4 in)	58 kg (128 lb)	23 April 1998 (aged 25)	(China) Kunlun Red Star

=== Denmark ===
The roster was announced on 11 March 2024.

Head coach: (Sweden) Björn Edlund

No.	Pos.	Name	Height	Weight	Birthdate	Team
1	G	Caroline Thomsen	1.80 m (5 ft 11 in)	78 kg (172 lb)	20 April 2002 (aged 21)	(Denmark) Rødovre SIK
2	D	Kristine Melberg Hansen	1.69 m (5 ft 7 in)	69 kg (152 lb)	28 December 2000 (aged 23)	(Denmark) Rødovre SIK
4	F	Silke Lave Glud	1.75 m (5 ft 9 in)	65 kg (143 lb)	3 March 1996 (aged 28)	(Sweden) Malmö Redhawks
6	D	Lærke Søndergaard	1.80 m (5 ft 11 in)	82 kg (181 lb)	5 January 2004 (aged 20)	(Sweden) Södertälje SK
7	F	Sara Knudsen	1.65 m (5 ft 5 in)	69 kg (152 lb)	28 June 1999 (aged 24)	(Denmark) Hvidovre IK
8	F	Olivia Ranum	1.69 m (5 ft 7 in)	56 kg (123 lb)	18 May 2008 (aged 15)	(Denmark) Aalborg Pirates
10	D	Silja Rasmussen	1.75 m (5 ft 9 in)	69 kg (152 lb)	16 February 2007 (aged 17)	(Denmark) Rødovre SIK
11	D	Amalie Andersen	1.73 m (5 ft 8 in)	74 kg (163 lb)	6 October 1999 (aged 24)	(Sweden) Rögle BK
12	F	Mille Kunnerup Sørensen – A	1.55 m (5 ft 1 in)	60 kg (130 lb)	17 December 2001 (aged 22)	(Sweden) Färjestad BK
13	F	Frida Kielstrup	1.54 m (5 ft 1 in)	63 kg (139 lb)	21 March 2005 (aged 19)	(Sweden) Malmö Redhawks
14	F	Nicoline Jensen – C	1.65 m (5 ft 5 in)	65 kg (143 lb)	8 November 1992 (aged 31)	(Sweden) Skellefteå AIK
15	D	Amanda Refsgaard	1.75 m (5 ft 9 in)	63 kg (139 lb)	8 March 2000 (aged 24)	(Denmark) Rødovre SIK
17	F	Sofia Skriver	1.65 m (5 ft 5 in)	60 kg (130 lb)	7 June 2003 (aged 20)	(United States) Mercyhurst Lakers
18	F	Maria Holm Peters	1.68 m (5 ft 6 in)	60 kg (130 lb)	16 September 1999 (aged 24)	(Denmark) Odense IK
19	D	Josephine Asperup – A	1.63 m (5 ft 4 in)	65 kg (143 lb)	21 July 1992 (aged 31)	(Sweden) Linköping HC
21	F	Sarah Stauning	1.72 m (5 ft 8 in)	65 kg (143 lb)	2 August 2004 (aged 19)	(Denmark) Rødovre SIK
22	D	Sofie Skott Dahl	1.72 m (5 ft 8 in)	62 kg (137 lb)	14 June 2002 (aged 21)	(United States) Vermont Catamounts
23	F	Julie Oksbjerg	1.78 m (5 ft 10 in)	67 kg (148 lb)	2 December 2000 (aged 23)	(Denmark) Odense IK
27	F	Lilli Friis-Hansen	1.63 m (5 ft 4 in)	57 kg (126 lb)	27 January 2000 (aged 24)	(Denmark) Rødovre SIK
29	F	Frederikke Foss	1.73 m (5 ft 8 in)	72 kg (159 lb)	12 February 2005 (aged 19)	(United States) Shattuck-Saint Mary's
31	G	Caroline Bjergstad	1.65 m (5 ft 5 in)	60 kg (130 lb)	9 March 2005 (aged 19)	(Sweden) Malmö Redhawks
33	G	Emma-Sofie Nordstrøm	1.77 m (5 ft 10 in)	77 kg (170 lb)	5 November 2002 (aged 21)	(United States) St. Lawrence Saints
63	F	Emma Russell	1.68 m (5 ft 6 in)	75 kg (165 lb)	18 August 1995 (aged 28)	(Denmark) Rødovre SIK

=== Germany ===
The roster was announced on 22 March 2024.

Head coach: (Canada) Jeff MacLeod

No.	Pos.	Name	Height	Weight	Birthdate	Team
5	D	Charlott Schaffrath	1.84 m (6 ft 0 in)	70 kg (150 lb)	26 December 2005 (aged 18)	(Germany) ECDC Memmingen
6	F	Theresa Wagner	1.64 m (5 ft 5 in)	59 kg (130 lb)	5 May 1995 (aged 28)	(Germany) ERC Ingolstadt
7	F	Franziska Feldmeier	1.64 m (5 ft 5 in)	68 kg (150 lb)	5 February 1999 (aged 25)	(Germany) ECDC Memmingen
8	D	Ronja Hark – A	1.58 m (5 ft 2 in)	60 kg (130 lb)	17 August 2003 (aged 20)	(Germany) ECDC Memmingen
9	F	Svenja Voigt	1.65 m (5 ft 5 in)	60 kg (130 lb)	29 March 2004 (aged 20)	(United States) St. Cloud State Huskies
11	F	Nicola Eisenschmid	1.66 m (5 ft 5 in)	66 kg (146 lb)	10 September 1996 (aged 27)	(Germany) ECDC Memmingen
13	F	Luisa Welcke	1.66 m (5 ft 5 in)	66 kg (146 lb)	29 April 2002 (aged 21)	(United States) Boston University Terriers
14	D	Carina Strobel	1.72 m (5 ft 8 in)	61 kg (134 lb)	11 September 1997 (aged 26)	(Germany) ECDC Memmingen
16	F	Jule Schiefer	1.73 m (5 ft 8 in)	65 kg (143 lb)	12 September 2001 (aged 22)	(Germany) ECDC Memmingen
17	F	Emily Nix	1.73 m (5 ft 8 in)	77 kg (170 lb)	12 January 1998 (aged 26)	(Germany) ERC Ingolstadt
18	F	Bernadette Karpf	1.67 m (5 ft 6 in)	63 kg (139 lb)	3 July 1996 (aged 27)	(Germany) ERC Ingolstadt
20	D	Daria Gleißner – C	1.70 m (5 ft 7 in)	70 kg (150 lb)	30 June 1993 (aged 30)	(Germany) ECDC Memmingen
21	D	Tabea Botthof	1.75 m (5 ft 9 in)	75 kg (165 lb)	1 June 2000 (aged 23)	(Germany) Mad Dogs Mannheim
25	F	Laura Kluge – A	1.79 m (5 ft 10 in)	63 kg (139 lb)	6 November 1996 (aged 27)	(Germany) ECDC Memmingen
26	D	Tara Schmitz	1.66 m (5 ft 5 in)	62 kg (137 lb)	16 March 1998 (aged 26)	(Germany) Mad Dogs Mannheim
28	D	Nina Jobst-Smith	1.69 m (5 ft 7 in)	66 kg (146 lb)	30 August 2001 (aged 22)	(United States) Minnesota Duluth Bulldogs
29	F	Nina Christof	1.64 m (5 ft 5 in)	66 kg (146 lb)	18 August 2002 (aged 21)	(United States) RPI Engineers
32	D	Lucia Schmitz	1.64 m (5 ft 5 in)	64 kg (141 lb)	15 April 2000 (aged 23)	(Germany) Mad Dogs Mannheim
33	F	Lilli Welcke	1.66 m (5 ft 5 in)	65 kg (143 lb)	29 April 2002 (aged 21)	(United States) Boston University Terriers
34	F	Celina Haider	1.70 m (5 ft 7 in)	62 kg (137 lb)	20 July 2000 (aged 23)	(Germany) ERC Ingolstadt
35	G	Sandra Abstreiter	1.81 m (5 ft 11 in)	78 kg (172 lb)	23 July 1998 (aged 25)	(Canada) PWHL Ottawa
67	G	Lisa Hemmerle	1.67 m (5 ft 6 in)	62 kg (137 lb)	11 December 1995 (aged 28)	(Germany) ERC Ingolstadt
95	G	Hannah Loist	1.71 m (5 ft 7 in)	62 kg (137 lb)	18 July 2007 (aged 16)	(Germany) Grizzlys Wolfsburg

=== Japan ===
The roster was announced on 21 March 2024.

Head coach: Yuji Iizuka

No.	Pos.	Name	Height	Weight	Birthdate	Team
2	D	Shiori Koike – C	1.59 m (5 ft 3 in)	53 kg (117 lb)	21 March 1993 (aged 31)	(Japan) DK Peregrine
3	D	Aoi Shiga	1.65 m (5 ft 5 in)	63 kg (139 lb)	4 July 1999 (aged 24)	(Japan) Toyota Cygnus
4	D	Ayaka Hitosato – A	1.61 m (5 ft 3 in)	58 kg (128 lb)	22 August 1994 (aged 29)	(Sweden) Linköping HC
5	D	Shiori Yamashita	1.58 m (5 ft 2 in)	53 kg (117 lb)	28 April 2002 (aged 21)	(Japan) Seibu Princess Rabbits
6	D	Kohane Sato	1.63 m (5 ft 4 in)	61 kg (134 lb)	16 March 2006 (aged 18)	(Japan) Daishin
7	D	Kanami Seki	1.68 m (5 ft 6 in)	62 kg (137 lb)	23 June 2000 (aged 23)	(Sweden) HV71
8	D	Akane Hosoyamada – A	1.63 m (5 ft 4 in)	60 kg (130 lb)	9 March 1992 (aged 32)	(Japan) DK Peregrine
9	D	An Shinoda	1.63 m (5 ft 4 in)	56 kg (123 lb)	3 July 2004 (aged 19)	(Japan) Takasu Clinic Mikage Gretz
10	F	Hikaru Yamashita	1.57 m (5 ft 2 in)	55 kg (121 lb)	23 September 2000 (aged 23)	(Sweden) AIK
11	F	Akane Shiga	1.65 m (5 ft 5 in)	61 kg (134 lb)	3 March 2001 (aged 23)	(Canada) PWHL Ottawa
14	F	Haruka Toko	1.67 m (5 ft 6 in)	65 kg (143 lb)	16 March 1997 (aged 27)	(Sweden) Linköping HC
15	F	Rui Ukita	1.70 m (5 ft 7 in)	70 kg (150 lb)	6 June 1996 (aged 27)	(Japan) Daishin
16	F	Yoshino Enomoto	1.62 m (5 ft 4 in)	57 kg (126 lb)	22 September 1998 (aged 25)	(Switzerland) Ladies Team Lugano
18	F	Suzuka Toko	1.61 m (5 ft 3 in)	53 kg (117 lb)	16 October 1996 (aged 27)	(Japan) DK Peregrine
19	F	Makoto Ito	1.68 m (5 ft 6 in)	65 kg (143 lb)	2 May 2004 (aged 19)	(Japan) Toyota Cygnus
20	G	Miyuu Masuhara	1.57 m (5 ft 2 in)	51 kg (112 lb)	4 October 2001 (aged 22)	(Japan) DK Peregrine
21	F	Marin Nagaoka	1.58 m (5 ft 2 in)	61 kg (134 lb)	27 July 2002 (aged 21)	(Japan) Seibu Princess Rabbits
24	F	Mei Miura	1.62 m (5 ft 4 in)	68 kg (150 lb)	16 November 1998 (aged 25)	(Sweden) AIK
27	F	Remi Koyama	1.47 m (4 ft 10 in)	52 kg (115 lb)	17 July 2000 (aged 23)	(Japan) Seibu Princess Rabbits
30	G	Haruka Kuromaru	1.67 m (5 ft 6 in)	52 kg (115 lb)	29 March 2007 (aged 17)	(Japan) CrystalBlades
31	G	Riko Kawaguchi	1.65 m (5 ft 5 in)	70 kg (150 lb)	19 September 2004 (aged 19)	(Japan) Daishin
40	F	Rio Noro	1.64 m (5 ft 5 in)	62 kg (137 lb)	15 May 2004 (aged 19)	(Japan) Daishin
61	F	Yumeka Wajima	1.56 m (5 ft 1 in)	50 kg (110 lb)	19 October 2002 (aged 21)	(Japan) DK Peregrine

=== Sweden ===
The roster was announced on 21 March 2024.

Head coach: Ulf Lundberg

No.	Pos.	Name	Height	Weight	Birthdate	Team
4	D	Linnéa Andersson	1.71 m (5 ft 7 in)	68 kg (150 lb)	30 September 1998 (aged 25)	(Sweden) MoDo Hockey
7	D	Mira Jungåker	1.70 m (5 ft 7 in)	68 kg (150 lb)	22 July 2005 (aged 18)	(Sweden) HV71
8	F	Hilda Svensson	1.67 m (5 ft 6 in)	64 kg (141 lb)	24 August 2006 (aged 17)	(Sweden) HV71
9	D	Emma Forsgren	1.72 m (5 ft 8 in)	68 kg (150 lb)	15 August 2002 (aged 21)	(Sweden) Djurgårdens IF
11	F	Josefin Bouveng	1.75 m (5 ft 9 in)	69 kg (152 lb)	15 May 2001 (aged 22)	(United States) Minnesota Golden Gophers
12	D	Maja Nylén Persson – A	1.64 m (5 ft 5 in)	67 kg (148 lb)	20 November 2000 (aged 23)	(Sweden) Brynäs IF
13	F	Wilma Sundin	1.65 m (5 ft 5 in)	62 kg (137 lb)	24 September 2003 (aged 20)	(Sweden) MoDo Hockey
14	D	Ida Karlsson	1.75 m (5 ft 9 in)	73 kg (161 lb)	30 June 2004 (aged 19)	(United States) Minnesota Duluth Bulldogs
17	F	Sofie Lundin	1.64 m (5 ft 5 in)	64 kg (141 lb)	15 February 2000 (aged 24)	(Sweden) Frölunda HC
19	F	Sara Hjalmarsson	1.76 m (5 ft 9 in)	74 kg (163 lb)	8 February 1998 (aged 26)	(Sweden) Linköping HC
21	F	Lova Blom	1.68 m (5 ft 6 in)	78 kg (172 lb)	15 July 2003 (aged 20)	(Sweden) Linköping HC
22	F	Hanna Thuvik	1.70 m (5 ft 7 in)	75 kg (165 lb)	17 May 2002 (aged 21)	(Sweden) Brynäs IF
23	F	Thea Johansson	1.71 m (5 ft 7 in)	67 kg (148 lb)	22 November 2002 (aged 21)	(United States) Mercyhurst Lakers
24	F	Ebba Hedqvist	1.68 m (5 ft 6 in)	67 kg (148 lb)	30 September 2006 (aged 17)	(Sweden) MoDo Hockey
25	F	Lina Ljungblom – A	1.67 m (5 ft 6 in)	79 kg (174 lb)	15 October 2001 (aged 22)	(Sweden) MoDo Hockey
26	F	Hanna Olsson	1.73 m (5 ft 8 in)	67 kg (148 lb)	20 January 1999 (aged 25)	(Sweden) Frölunda HC
29	F	Felizia Wikner Zienkiewicz	1.70 m (5 ft 7 in)	65 kg (143 lb)	17 September 1999 (aged 24)	(Sweden) Frölunda HC
30	G	Emma Söderberg	1.71 m (5 ft 7 in)	67 kg (148 lb)	18 February 1998 (aged 26)	(United States) PWHL Boston
31	G	Ida Boman	1.66 m (5 ft 5 in)	58 kg (128 lb)	1 April 2003 (aged 21)	(Sweden) Djurgårdens IF
34	F	Mira Hallin	1.67 m (5 ft 6 in)	65 kg (143 lb)	24 April 2006 (aged 17)	(Sweden) MoDo Hockey
35	G	Tindra Holm	1.72 m (5 ft 8 in)	68 kg (150 lb)	26 May 2001 (aged 22)	(United States) LIU Sharks
45	D	Paula Bergström	1.72 m (5 ft 8 in)	69 kg (152 lb)	26 January 1999 (aged 25)	(United States) Minnesota Duluth Bulldogs
71	D	Anna Kjellbin – C	1.69 m (5 ft 7 in)	63 kg (139 lb)	16 March 1994 (aged 30)	(Sweden) Luleå HF
