= 2015 IIHF Women's World Championship Division I =

International ice hockey competition

Tournament details
- Host countries: France; China
- Venues: 2 (in 2 host cities)
- Dates: 12–18 April 2015; 6–12 April 2015
- Teams: 12

The 2015 IIHF Women's World Championship Division I consisted of two international ice hockey tournaments organized by the International Ice Hockey Federation. Division I A and Division I B represent the second and third tier of the IIHF Women's World Championship.

== Venues ==
Division I Group A	Division I Group B
Rouen	Beijing
Île Lacroix; Capacity: 2,747	Capital Indoor Stadium; Capacity: 18,000

== Division I Group A ==
2015 IIHF Women's World Championship Division I A
Tournament details
- Host country: France
- City: Rouen
- Venue: 1 (in 1 host city)
- Dates: 12–18 April 2015
- Teams: 6

Tournament statistics
- Games played: 15
- Goals scored: 92 (6.13 per game)
- Attendance: 13,599 (907 per game)
- Scoring leader: (Austria) Anna Meixner (11 points)

The Division I Group A tournament was played in Rouen, France, from 12 to 18 April 2015.

=== Participating teams ===
Team	Qualification
Czech Republic	Lost Top Division playoff last year.
Norway	Placed 2nd in Division I A last year.
Denmark	Placed 3rd in Division I A last year.
France	Hosts; placed 4th in Division I A last year.
Austria	Placed 5th in Division I A last year.
Latvia	Placed 1st in Division I B last year and was promoted.

=== Match officials ===
4 Referees and 8 linesman were selected for the tournament.

Referees

- (Slovakia) Zuzana Findurová
- (Canada) Lisa Grison
- (Germany) Michaela Kiefer
- (United States) Melissa Szkola

Linesman

- (France) Anne Boniface
- (France) Charlotte Girard
- (Italy) Mirjam Gruber
- (Germany) Daniela Kiefer
- (Switzerland) Anne-Ruth Kuonen
- (Canada) Justine Todd
- (France) Sueva Torribio
- (Finland) Jenni Visala

=== Final standings ===
Pos	Team	Pld	W	OTW	OTL	L	GF	GA	GD	Pts	Promotion or relegation
1	Czech Republic	5	5	0	0	0	20	4	+16	15	Promoted to the 2016 Top Division
2	Austria	5	4	0	0	1	25	10	+15	12	
3	France (H)	5	2	0	1	2	17	15	+2	7	
4	Denmark	5	2	0	0	3	12	18	−6	6	
5	Norway	5	1	1	0	3	12	18	−6	5	
6	Latvia	5	0	0	0	5	6	27	−21	0	Relegated to the 2016 Division I B

Source: IIHF
(H) Host

=== Match results ===
All times are local (Central European Summer Time – UTC+2).

12 April 2015; 12:30	Latvia	1–5 (0–1, 1–1, 0–3)	Czech Republic	Île Lacroix, Rouen; Attendance: 212

Game reference

Evija Tētiņa
Goalies
Klára Peslarová
Referee:
(United States) Melissa Szkola
Linesmen:
(Italy) Mirjam Gruber
(Switzerland) Anne-Ruth Kuonen

	0–1	03:01 – Polenská (Tejralová)
	0–2	29:58 – Mrázová (Křížová) (PP)
Ozmena (Mihejenko) – 38:20	1–2
	1–3	49:50 – Lédlová (Vanišová) (PP)
	1–4	54:21 – Mrázová (Křížová)
	1–5	57:27 – Křížová

10 min
Penalties
4 min
5
Shots
56

12 April 2015; 16:00	France	5–6 OT (0–2, 2–2, 3–1) (OT: 0–1)	Norway	Île Lacroix, Rouen; Attendance: 2,017

Game reference

Caroline Baldin
Goalies
Toini Nilsen
Referee:
(Slovakia) Zuzana Findurová
Linesmen:
(Canada) Justine Todd
(Finland) Jenni Visala

	0–1	05:08 – Martinsen (Tautra)
	0–2	19:02 – Dalen
Bouetz-Andrieu – 22:17	1–2
	1–3	30:15 – Hjelm (Dalen)
	1–4	30:45 – Morset (Haug-Hansen)
Passard – 38:10	2–4
	2–5	41:10 – Dalen
Passard (Baudrit) (PP) – 46:03	3–5
Allemoz (PP) – 49:44	4–5
Fohrer (Allemoz) (EA) – 59:55	5–5
	5–6	62:59 – Haug-Hansen

14 min
Penalties
20 min
25
Shots
33

12 April 2015; 19:30	Austria	8–2 (1–1, 2–1, 5–0)	Denmark	Île Lacroix, Rouen; Attendance: 263

Game reference

Paula Marchhart
Goalies
Julie Clayton
Referee:
(Germany) Michaela Kiefer
Linesmen:
(France) Charlotte Girard
(France) Sueva Torribio

Meixner (Hummel, Hanser) – 09:56	1–0
	1–1	18:17 – Weis
	1–2	21:18 – Gregersen (SH)
Weber (Altmann) – 29:02	2–2
Beiter (Kantor) – 38:31	3–2
Meixner (Altmann, Kantor) (EA) – 42:42	4–2
Hummel (Meixner) – 47:59	5–2
Beiter (Weber, Altmann) – 51:29	6–2
Wittich (Hummel) – 54:11	7–2
Hummel (Wittich, Meixner) – 54:35	8–2

2 min
Penalties
6 min
34
Shots
22

13 April 2015; 12:30	Norway	2–5 (1–1, 0–3, 1–1)	Austria	Île Lacroix, Rouen; Attendance: 473

Game reference

Ingrid Sandven
Goalies
Paula Marchhart
Referee:
(Germany) Michaela Kiefer
Linesmen:
(France) Charlotte Girard
(Switzerland) Anne-Ruth Kuonen

	0–1	09:12 – Beiter-Schwarzler (Altmann) (SH)
Fischer (Berntsen, Haug-Hansen) – 19:34	1–1
	1–2	26:17 – Altmann (Beiter-Schwarzler)
	1–3	33:17 – Kantor (Weber) (PP)
	1–4	38:00 – Beiter-Schwarzler (Altmann, Weber)
Olafsen (Dalen) – 40:16	2–4
	2–5	59:48 – Beiter-Schwarzler (Fazokas) (ENG)

8 min
Penalties
4 min
18
Shots
32

13 April 2015; 16:00	Denmark	5–4 (2–3, 1–1, 2–0)	Latvia	Île Lacroix, Rouen; Attendance: 178

Game reference

Amalie Joa
Goalies
Evija Tētiņa
Referee:
(Slovakia) Zuzana Findurová
Linesmen:
(Italy) Mirjam Gruber
(France) Sueva Torribio

Brix (Henriksen) – 03:06	1–0
	1–1	07:10 – A. Apsīte (Pētersone)
Persson – 14:10	2–1
	2–2	16:34 – Miljone (Mihejenko, Koka) (PP)
	2–3	18:41 – Miljone (Kubliņa)
Jakobsen – 23:03	3–3
	3–4	31:14 – Pētersone (A. Apsīte, Bičevska)
Jakobsen (Brix) – 52:26	4–4
Persson (Weis) – 54:14	5–4

12 min
Penalties
10 min
47
Shots
16

13 April 2015; 19:30	Czech Republic	4–0 (0–0, 4–0, 0–0)	France	Île Lacroix, Rouen; Attendance: 1,184

Game reference

Klára Peslarová
Goalies
Jeanne Morin
Caroline Baldin
Referee:
(Canada) Lisa Grison
Linesmen:
(Germany) Daniela Kiefer
(Finland) Jenni Visala

Polenská (Mrázová) (PP) – 22:59	1–0
Vanišová (Pejzlová, Horálková) – 35:00	2–0
Studentová (Pejzlová, Herzigová) – 36:28	3–0
Vanišová (Přibylová) (SH) – 38:08	4–0

14 min
Penalties
16 min
35
Shots
12

15 April 2015; 12:30	Norway	0–3 (0–1, 0–2, 0–0)	Denmark	Île Lacroix, Rouen; Attendance: 702

Game reference

Toini-Veronica Nilsen
Goalies
Julie Clayton
Referee:
(United States) Melissa Szkola
Linesmen:
(France) Sueva Torribio
(Finland) Jenni Visala

0–1	15:15 – Jakobsen (Olausson) (PP)
0–2	25:44 – Jakobsen (Brix)
0–3	35:05 – Weis (Frandsen) (PP)

10 min
Penalties
12 min
22
Shots
32

15 April 2015; 16:00	Czech Republic	4–1 (3–1, 0–0, 1–0)	Austria	Île Lacroix, Rouen; Attendance: 349

Game reference

Klára Peslarová
Goalies
Paula Marchhart
Referee:
(Canada) Lisa Grison
Linesmen:
(France) Charlotte Girard
(Italy) Mirjam Gruber

Lédlová (Polenská) (PP2) – 06:32	1–0
	1–1	07:16 – Meixner
Křížová (Tejralová) – 09:15	2–1
Polenská (Mrázová, Tejralová) (PP) – 11:04	3–1
Polenská (Mrázová, Zedníková) – 56:54	4–1

10 min
Penalties
16 min
27
Shots
15

15 April 2015; 19:30	Latvia	0–7 (0–4, 0–1, 0–2)	France	Île Lacroix, Rouen; Attendance: 1,515

Game reference

Evija Tētiņa
Goalies
Caroline Baldin
Referee:
(Germany) Michaela Kiefer
Linesmen:
(Germany) Daniela Kiefer
(Canada) Justine Todd

0–1	01:01 – Allemoz (Passard, Villiot)
0–2	04:05 – Allemoz (Passard)
0–3	06:57 – Aurard (Baudrit, Passard) (PP)
0–4	13:33 – Baudrit (Gendarme) (PP)
0–5	26:57 – Parment (Duvin, Jouanny) (PP)
0–6	42:58 – Allemoz (Gendarme, Baudrit) (PP)
0–7	59:08 – Duvin (Escudero, Bouché)

18 min
Penalties
18 min
28
Shots
41

16 April 2015; 12:30	Denmark	0–3 (0–1, 0–0, 0–2)	Czech Republic	Île Lacroix, Rouen; Attendance: 1,789

Game reference

Julie Clayton
Goalies
Klára Peslarová
Referee:
(Slovakia) Zuzana Findurová
Linesmen:
(France) Charlotte Girard
(Germany) Daniela Kiefer

0–1	13:28 – Křížová (Polenská)
0–2	40:37 – Tejralová (Polenská, Mrázová) (PP)
0–3	51:56 – Přibylová (Lédlová)

8 min
Penalties
4 min
11
Shots
26

16 April 2015; 16:00	Norway	2–1 (1–0, 0–1, 1–0)	Latvia	Île Lacroix, Rouen; Attendance: 404

Game reference

Toini Nilsen
Goalies
Evija Tētiņa
Referee:
(Canada) Lisa Grison
Linesmen:
(Switzerland) Anne-Ruth Kuonen
(France) Sueva Torribio

Farstad (Hjelm, Dalen) – 12:19	1–0
	1–1	39:06 – Pētersone (Miljone)
Haug-Hansen (Tautra) – 54:28	2–1

10 min
Penalties
4 min
45
Shots
19

16 April 2015; 19:30	France	2–3 (2–0, 0–3, 0–0)	Austria	Île Lacroix, Rouen; Attendance: 1,300

Game reference

Caroline Baldin
Goalies
Paula Marchhart
Referee:
(United States) Melissa Szkola
Linesmen:
(Canada) Justine Todd
(Finland) Jenni Visala

Allemoz (Passard) – 07:36	1–0
Allemoz (Passard) – 17:35	2–0
	2–1	21:03 – Beiter (Altmann, Kantor) (PP)
	2–2	21:37 – Meixner (Hummel, Volgger)
	2–3	32:17 – Altmann (SH)

12 min
Penalties
8 min
27
Shots
28

18 April 2015; 12:30	Austria	8–0 (1–0, 3–0, 4–0)	Latvia	Île Lacroix, Rouen; Attendance: 185

Game reference

Nicole Arnberger
Goalies
Evija Tētiņa
Evelīna Nikolajeva
Referee:
(Germany) Michaela Kiefer
Linesmen:
(Italy) Mirjam Gruber
(France) Sueva Torribio

Meixner (Hummel, Volgger) – 15:13	1–0
Meixner (Hummel, Volgger) – 24:36	2–0
Beiter (Matzka) – 29:01	3–0
Hummel (Meixner, Matzka) – 35:59	4–0
Meixner (Volgger) – 41:58	5–0
Fazokas (Kantor, Beiter) – 47:46	6–0
Meixner (Volgger) – 51:48	7–0
Wittich (Beiter) (ENG) – 59:49	8–0

6 min
Penalties
6 min
41
Shots
16

18 April 2015; 16:00	Czech Republic	4–2 (0–0, 1–1, 3–1)	Norway	Île Lacroix, Rouen; Attendance: 806

Game reference

Blanka Škodová
Goalies
Ingrid Sandven
Referee:
(United States) Melissa Szkola
Linesmen:
(France) Charlotte Girard
(Canada) Justine Todd

	0–1	22:17 – Haug-Hansen (Berntsen)
Přibylová (Vanišová) – 29:53	1–1
Vanišová (Lédlová) – 40:59	2–1
	2–2	49:31 – Haug-Hansen (Fischer)
Vanišová (SH) – 57:01	3–2
Mrázová (SH, ENG) – 59:42	4–2

4 min
Penalties
2 min
23
Shots
19

18 April 2015; 18:30	Denmark	2–3 (2–1, 0–1, 0–1)	France	Île Lacroix, Rouen; Attendance: 2,222

Game reference

Julie Clayton
Goalies
Jeanne Morin
Referee:
(Canada) Lisa Grison
Linesmen:
(Germany) Daniela Kiefer
(Switzerland) Anne-Ruth Kuonen

Henriksen (Jakobsen, Olausson) (PP2) – 09:18	1–0
Persson (Asperup, Frandsen) (PP) – 09:48	2–0
	2–1	18:38 – Bouché (Fohrer)
	2–2	32:41 – Fohrer (Bouetz-Andrieu, Duvin) (PP)
	2–3	56:02 – Villiot (Duvin)

12 min
Penalties
8 min
23
Shots
32

=== Awards and statistics ===
==== Awards ====
- Best players selected by the directorate:
  - Best Goalkeeper: (Czech Republic) Klára Peslarová
  - Best Defenseman: (Czech Republic) Aneta Tejralová
  - Best Forward: (Austria) Anna Meixner

Source: IIHF.com

==== Scoring leaders ====
List shows the top skaters sorted by points, then goals.

Player	GP	G	A	Pts	+/−	PIM	POS
(Austria) Anna Meixner	5	8	3	11	+9	2	F
(Austria) Eva Beiter	5	7	3	10	+10	2	F
(Austria) Denise Altmann	5	2	7	9	+8	4	F
(Austria) Victoria Hummel	5	3	5	8	+8	2	F
(France) Marion Allemoz	5	4	3	7	−1	2	F
(Czech Republic) Alena Polenská	5	4	3	7	+6	0	F
(Czech Republic) Kateřina Mrázová	5	3	4	7	+5	2	F
(France) Emmanuelle Passard	5	3	4	7	0	0	F
(Norway) Madelen Haug-Hansen	5	4	2	6	+2	2	F
(Czech Republic) Tereza Vanišová	5	4	2	6	+4	4	F

GP = Games played; G = Goals; A = Assists; Pts = Points; +/− = Plus/minus; PIM = Penalties in minutes; POS = Position
Source: IIHF.com

==== Leading goaltenders ====
Only the top five goaltenders, based on save percentage, who have played at least 40% of their team's minutes, are included in this list.

Player	TOI	GA	GAA	SA	Sv%	SO
(Czech Republic) Klára Peslarová	240:00	2	0.50	43	95.35	2
(France) Caroline Baldin	201:16	9	2.68	98	90.82	1
(Latvia) Evija Tētiņa	277:53	23	4.97	221	89.59	0
(Austria) Paula Marchhart	240:00	10	2.50	94	89.36	0
(Norway) Toini Nilsen	181:38	9	2.97	76	88.16	0

TOI = Time on ice (minutes:seconds); SA = Shots against; GA = Goals against; GAA = Goals against average; Sv% = Save percentage; SO = Shutouts
Source: IIHF.com

== Division I Group B ==
2015 IIHF Women's World Championship Division I B
Tournament details
- Host country: China
- City: Beijing
- Venue: 1 (in 1 host city)
- Dates: 6–12 April 2015
- Teams: 6

Tournament statistics
- Games played: 15
- Goals scored: 85 (5.67 per game)
- Attendance: 15,867 (1,058 per game)
- Scoring leader: (China) Zhang Mengying (9 points)

The Division I Group B tournament was played in Beijing, China, from 6 to 12 April 2015.

=== Participating teams ===
Team	Qualification
Slovakia	Placed 6th in Division I A last year and were relegated.
China	Hosts; placed 2nd in Division I B last year.
Hungary	Placed 3rd in Division I B last year.
Netherlands	Placed 4th in Division I B last year.
North Korea	Placed 5th in Division I B last year.
Italy	Placed 1st in Division II A last year and were promoted.

=== Match officials ===
4 Referees and 7 linesman were selected for the tournament.

Referees

- (Finland) Henna Åberg
- (Germany) Katja Bandlofsky
- (Canada) Brandy Dewar
- (United States) Samantha Hiller

Linesman

- (Switzerland) Tanja Cadonau
- (United States) Michela Frattarelli
- (Japan) Tomomi Kaneko
- (Sweden) Stina Nilsson
- (China) Sang Hong
- (Czech Republic) Gabriela Šťastná
- (Germany) Harriet Weegh

=== Final standings ===
Pos	Team	Pld	W	OTW	OTL	L	GF	GA	GD	Pts	Promotion or relegation
1	Slovakia	5	4	1	0	0	21	8	+13	14	Promoted to the 2016 Division I A
2	Netherlands	5	3	1	0	1	16	6	+10	11	
3	China (H)	5	3	0	1	1	21	15	+6	10	
4	Hungary	5	2	0	0	3	10	12	−2	6	
5	Italy	5	1	0	1	3	11	14	−3	4	
6	North Korea	5	0	0	0	5	6	30	−24	0	Relegated to the 2016 Division II A

Source: IIHF
(H) Host

=== Match results ===
All times are local (Time in China – UTC+8).

6 April 2015; 13:00	North Korea	1–5 (0–2, 0–1, 1–2)	Hungary	Capital Indoor Stadium, Beijing; Attendance: 826

Game reference

Ri Hye-yong
So Jong-sim
Goalies
Anikó Németh
Referee:
(Finland) Henna Åberg
Linesmen:
(United States) Michela Frattarelli
(Japan) Tomomi Kaneko

	0–1	13:57 – Horváth (L. Pintér)
	0–2	19:53 – Dabasi
	0–3	35:21 – L. Pintér (H. Pintér)
	0–4	45:10 – Kiss-Simon (Dabasi) (PP)
Ryu (Kim S., Han) – 47:51	1–4
	1–5	52:10 – Ungár (Németh) (PP2)

12 min
Penalties
4 min
9
Shots
36

6 April 2015; 16:15	Italy	3–4 GWS (2–3, 1–0, 0–0) (OT: 0–0) (SO: 0–1)	Slovakia	Capital Indoor Stadium, Beijing; Attendance: 857

Game reference

Giulia Mazzocchi
Goalies
Monika Kvaková
Referee:
(United States) Samantha Hiller
Linesmen:
(China) Sang Hong
(Germany) Harriet Weegh

	0–1	08:41 – Gápová (Herichová)
Dalpra (Bettarini) – 10:40	1–1
Larger (Carignano) – 11:28	2–1
	2–2	14:28 – Mikesková (Žitňanská)
	2–3	19:24 – Kollová (Sroková)
Larger (Zaccherini) – 27:06	3–3

Larger
Dalpra (miss)
Carignano (miss)
Larger (miss)
Dalpra (miss)
Shootout
(miss) Mikesková
Žitňanská
(miss) Lúčová
(miss) Herichová
Lalíková
10 min
Penalties
12 min
22
Shots
37

6 April 2015; 19:30	Netherlands	3–2 GWS (0–1, 1–1, 1–0) (OT: 0–0) (SO: 1–0)	China	Capital Indoor Stadium, Beijing; Attendance: 1,196

Game reference

Claudia van Leeuwen
Goalies
Shi Yao
Referee:
(Germany) Katja Bandlofsky
Linesmen:
(Sweden) Stina Nilsson
(Czech Republic) Gabriela Šťastná

	0–1	12:25 – Sun (Zhang M.)
De Jong – 22:29	1–1
	1–2	30:54 – Sun (Qi) (PP)
Keijzer (Hamers, Van Nes) (PP) – 41:23	2–2

De Jong (miss)
Wielenga (miss)
Zwarthoed
Shootout
(miss) Kong
(miss) Sun
(miss) Zhang M.
26 min
Penalties
22 min
37
Shots
37

7 April 2015; 13:00	Hungary	2–1 (0–0, 1–1, 1–0)	Italy	Capital Indoor Stadium, Beijing; Attendance: 849

Game reference

Anikó Németh
Goalies
Daniela Klotz
Referee:
(United States) Samantha Hiller
Linesmen:
(Japan) Tomomi Kaneko
(Czech Republic) Gabriela Šťastná

Medgyes (L. Pintér) (PP) – 28:42	1–0
	1–1	32:12 – Saletta (Ricca
Medgyes (K. Jókai-Szilágyi) (PP) – 47:06	2–1

8 min
Penalties
8 min
24
Shots
31

7 April 2015; 16:15	Slovakia	3–2 (0–1, 1–0, 2–1)	Netherlands	Capital Indoor Stadium, Beijing; Attendance: 839

Game reference

Romana Kiapešová
Goalies
Claudia van Leeuwnen
Referee:
(Finland) Henna Åberg
Linesmen:
(Switzerland) Tanja Cadonau
(China) Sang Hong

	0–1	07:11 – Van Nes (Martens)
Mikesková (Lúčová, Žitňanská) – 39:33	1–1
Košecká (Gápová, T. Ištocyová) (PP) – 55:48	2–1
Žitňanská (Lúčová) (ENG) – 59:33	3–1
	3–2	59:41 – Barbier (Tegelaar)

10 min
Penalties
24 min
35
Shots
18

7 April 2015; 19:30	China	5–2 (4–1, 1–0, 0–1)	North Korea	Capital Indoor Stadium, Beijing; Attendance: 1,473

Game reference

Shi Yao
Goalies
Ri Hye-yong
Referee:
(Canada) Brandy Dewar
Linesmen:
(United States) Michela Frattarelli
(Germany) Harriet Weegh

Zhang M. (Sun, Qi) (PP) – 00:54	1–0
Zhang M. (Yu, Liu Z.) – 05:30	2–0
Kong (Yu) – 09:58	3–0
	3–1	10:32 – Ryu (O)
Zhang M. (Ma, Sun) – 11:57	4–1
Zhu (Lu, Liu Z.) – 32:46	5–1
	5–2	57:18 – Kim Un-a. (Kim Un-h., Han) (PP)

4 min
Penalties
4 min
26
Shots
30

9 April 2015; 13:00	Slovakia	9–0 (2–0, 5–0, 2–0)	North Korea	Capital Indoor Stadium, Beijing; Attendance: 751

Game reference

Monika Kvaková
Goalies
Ri Hye-yong
So Jong-sim
Referee:
(Germany) Katja Bandlofsky
Linesmen:
(Sweden) Stina Nilsson
(Germany) Harriet Weegh

Lúčová (T. Ištocyová, Palová) (PP) – 04:19	1–0
Korenková (Lalíková) – 18:13	2–0
Herichová (Gápová, Sroková) – 25:03	3–0
Gápová (Sroková, Herichová) – 28:44	4–0
Košecká (Korenková, Drábeková) – 34:25	5–0
Gápová (Mišková) – 35:29	6–0
Herichová – 39:10	7–0
Sroková (Gápová, T. Ištocyová) (PP2) – 58:51	8–0
Kollová (Trebulová, Žitňanská) (PP) – 59:19	9–0

2 min
Penalties
35 min
38
Shots
20

9 April 2015; 16:15	Italy	0–2 (0–1, 0–1, 0–0)	Netherlands	Capital Indoor Stadium, Beijing; Attendance: 648

Game reference
Giulia Mazzocchi	Goalies	Claudia van Leeuwen	Referee: (Canada) Brandy Dewar; Linesmen: (United States) Michela Frattarelli (China) Sang Hong
0–1 / 01:24 – Barton (Keijzer, Hamers) (PP); 0–2 / 32:34 – Even (Tjin-A-Ton, Martens)			Referee: (Canada) Brandy Dewar; Linesmen: (United States) Michela Frattarelli (China) Sang Hong
12 min	Penalties	10 min	Referee: (Canada) Brandy Dewar; Linesmen: (United States) Michela Frattarelli (China) Sang Hong
25	Shots	24	Referee: (Canada) Brandy Dewar; Linesmen: (United States) Michela Frattarelli (China) Sang Hong

9 April 2015; 19:30	China	7–3 (1–1, 4–1, 2–1)	Hungary	Capital Indoor Stadium, Beijing; Attendance: 1,483

Game reference

Shi Yao
Wang Yuqing
Goalies
Anikó Németh
Referee:
(Finland) Henna Åberg
Linesmen:
(Switzerland) Tanja Cadonau
(Japan) Tomomi Kaneko

Wen (Yu, Fang) (PP) – 05:13	1–0
	1–1	19:33 – Dabasi (H. Pintér, Medgyes)
Kong (Zhang M.) – 20:28	2–1
Yu (Qi) (PP2) – 24:57	3–1
Yu (Liu Z., Fang) (PP) – 35:14	4–1
	4–2	36:26 – Kiss-Simon (Horváth) (PP)
Zhang M. (Kong) – 39:00	5–2
Wen (Fang) – 50:00	6–2
Yu (Liu Z., Wen) (PP) – 56:10	7–2
	7–3	56:51 – Medgyes

8 min
Penalties
20 min
37
Shots
32

11 April 2015; 13:00	Hungary	0–1 (0–0, 0–1, 0–0)	Slovakia	Capital Indoor Stadium, Beijing; Attendance: 729

Game reference
Anikó Németh	Goalies	Romana Kiapešová	Referee: (Canada) Brandy Dewar; Linesmen: (United States) Michela Frattarelli (Czech Republic) Gabriela Šťastná
0–1 / 23:48 – Lúčová (Mikesková, Trebulová)			Referee: (Canada) Brandy Dewar; Linesmen: (United States) Michela Frattarelli (Czech Republic) Gabriela Šťastná
24 min	Penalties	12 min	Referee: (Canada) Brandy Dewar; Linesmen: (United States) Michela Frattarelli (Czech Republic) Gabriela Šťastná
22	Shots	31	Referee: (Canada) Brandy Dewar; Linesmen: (United States) Michela Frattarelli (Czech Republic) Gabriela Šťastná

11 April 2015; 16:15	Netherlands	7–1 (1–0, 2–0, 4–1)	North Korea	Capital Indoor Stadium, Beijing; Attendance: 982

Game reference

Claudia van Leeuwen
Bianka Bos
Goalies
Ri Hye-yong
Referee:
(Germany) Katja Bandlofsky
Linesmen:
(Japan) Tomomi Kaneko
(China) Sang Hong

Tjin-A-Ton (Huisman, De Jong) (PP) – 12:27	1–0
Wielenga (SH) – 26:22	2–0
Wielenga (De Jong, Hamers) (PP2) – 33:26	3–0
Barton (Tjin-A-Ton, Milders) – 43:39	4–0
Even (Tjin-A-Ton, Van Nes) – 45:11	5–0
Keijzer (Barbier, De Jong) – 49:08	6–0
Zwarthoed (Wielenga) – 56:23	7–0
	7–1	57:40 – Jin (Ro)

8 min
Penalties
12 min
33
Shots
22

11 April 2015; 19:30	China	4–3 (1–1, 0–1, 3–1)	Italy	Capital Indoor Stadium, Beijing; Attendance: 1,676

Game reference

Shi Yao
Goalies
Giulia Mazzocchi
Referee:
(United States) Samantha Hiller
Linesmen:
(Switzerland) Tanja Cadonau
(Sweden) Stina Nilsson

Ma (Liu Z.) – 00:52	1–0
	1–1	12:40 – Carignano (Bettarini)
	1–2	39:33 – Larger
Sun (Yu) (PP) – 46:34	2–2
Zhang M. (Yu) – 48:48	3–2
	3–3	49:13 – Dalpra (Zandegiacomo)
Qi (Sun) (PP) – 57:43	4–3

6 min
Penalties
12 min
21
Shots
22

12 April 2015; 13:00	North Korea	2–4 (0–1, 1–0, 1–3)	Italy	Capital Indoor Stadium, Beijing; Attendance: 746

Game reference

Ri Hye-yong
Goalies
Daniela Klotz
Referee:
(Canada) Brandy Dewar
Linesmen:
(Sweden) Stina Nilsson
(Germany) Harriet Weegh

	0–1	14:55 – Larger (Gius, Bettarini) (PP)
Kim H. (Han) (EA) – 43:44	1–1
	1–2	40:33 – Dalpra (Saletta, Bettarini)
O (Kim Un-h., Ryu) (PP) – 43:44	2–2
	2–3	45:26 – Bettarini (Larger, Gius) (PP)
	2–4	49:55 – Elliscasis (Dalpra)

14 min
Penalties
4 min
20
Shots
30

12 April 2015; 16:15	Hungary	0–2 (0–1, 0–1, 0–0)	Netherlands	Capital Indoor Stadium, Beijing; Attendance: 719

Game reference
Anikó Németh	Goalies	Claudia van Leeuwen	Referee: (United States) Samantha Hiller; Linesmen: (China) Sang Hong (Czech Republic) Gabriela Šťastná
0–1 / 04:32 – De Jong (Wielenga) (PP); 0–2 / 37:50 – De Jong (Barbier)			Referee: (United States) Samantha Hiller; Linesmen: (China) Sang Hong (Czech Republic) Gabriela Šťastná
12 min	Penalties	10 min	Referee: (United States) Samantha Hiller; Linesmen: (China) Sang Hong (Czech Republic) Gabriela Šťastná
21	Shots	28	Referee: (United States) Samantha Hiller; Linesmen: (China) Sang Hong (Czech Republic) Gabriela Šťastná

12 April 2015; 19:30	Slovakia	4–3 (2–1, 2–0, 0–2)	China	Capital Indoor Stadium, Beijing; Attendance: 2,093

Game reference

Romana Kiapešová
Goalies
Shi Yao
Wang Yuqing
Referee:
(Finland) Henna Åberg
Linesmen:
(Switzerland) Tanja Cadonau
(United States) Michela Frattarelli

	0–1	00:12 – Zhang M. (Sun)
Gápová (Herichová) – 12:53	1–1
Mikesková (Lúčová) (PP) – 16:48	2–1
Košecká (Kollová, Lalíková) – 28:24	3–1
Herichová (Sroková) (SH) – 32:20	4–1
	4–2	57:30 – Sun (Wen)
	4–3	59:46 – Zhang M. (Qi, Yu) (PP2, EA)

12 min
Penalties
8 min
37
Shots
24

=== Awards and statistics ===
==== Awards ====
- Best players selected by the directorate:
  - Best Goalkeeper: (Netherlands) Claudia van Leeuwen
  - Best Defenseman: (Hungary) Franciska Kiss-Simon
  - Best Forward: (China) Zhang Mengying

Source: IIHF.com

==== Scoring leaders ====
List shows the top skaters sorted by points, then goals.

Player	GP	G	A	Pts	+/−	PIM	POS
(China) Zhang Mengying	5	7	2	9	+3	2	F
(China) Yu Baiwei	5	3	6	9	+2	4	D
(China) Sun Rui	5	4	4	8	+3	4	F
(Slovakia) Nikola Gápová	5	4	3	7	+2	4	F
(Netherlands) Mieneke de Jong	5	3	3	6	+2	14	F
(Slovakia) Mária Herichová	5	3	3	6	+2	4	F
(Italy) Beatrix Larger	5	4	1	5	0	2	F
(Slovakia) Lívia Lúčová	5	2	3	5	+1	4	F
(Netherlands) Savine Wielenga	5	2	3	5	+1	0	F
(Italy) Valentina Bettarini	5	1	4	5	0	4	D
(China) Qi Xueting	5	1	4	5	0	0	D
(Slovakia) Lenka Sroková	5	1	4	5	+3	4	F

GP = Games played; G = Goals; A = Assists; Pts = Points; +/− = Plus/minus; PIM = Penalties in minutes; POS = Position
Source: IIHF.com

==== Leading goaltenders ====
Only the top five goaltenders, based on save percentage, who have played at least 40% of their team's minutes, are included in this list.

Player	TOI	GA	GAA	SA	Sv%	SO
(Netherlands) Claudia van Leeuwen	283:27	4	0.85	132	96.97	2
(Slovakia) Monika Kvaková	125:00	3	1.44	42	92.86	1
(Slovakia) Romana Kiapešová	180:00	5	1.67	64	92.19	1
(Hungary) Anikó Németh	297:56	12	2.42	136	91.18	0
(China) Shi Yao	276:20	14	3.04	148	90.54	0

TOI = Time on ice (minutes:seconds); SA = Shots against; GA = Goals against; GAA = Goals against average; Sv% = Save percentage; SO = Shutouts
Source: IIHF.com
