= Liu Zhixin =

Chinese ice hockey player (born 1993)

- Born: 25 April 1993 (age 33) Qiqihar, Heilongjiang, China
- Height: 178 cm (5 ft 10 in)
- Weight: 81 kg (179 lb; 12 st 11 lb)
- Position: Defence
- Shoots: Right
- WCIHL team Former teams: Shenzhen KRS: KRS Vanke Rays; Kunlun Red Star WIH; Qiqihar IHC
- National team: China
- Playing career: 2009–present
Medal record
Asian Winter Games
Silver medal – second place	2017 Sapporo	Ice hockey
Bronze medal – third place	2011 Astana-Almaty	Ice hockey
Challenge Cup of Asia
Gold medal – first place	2014 Harbin
Silver medal – second place	2012 Qiqihar

Liu Zhixin
- Traditional Chinese: 劉智新
- Simplified Chinese: 刘智新
Transcriptions
Standard Mandarin
- Hanyu Pinyin: Liú Zhìxīn

Liu Zhixin (Chinese: 刘智新; born 25 April 1993) is a Chinese ice hockey player and member of the Chinese national team, currently playing in the Chinese Women's Ice Hockey League (WCIHL) with Shenzhen KRS. A two-time Olympian, she was the youngest member of the Chinese delegation at the 2010 Winter Olympics, where she represented the country in the women's ice hockey tournament, and also represented China in the women's ice hockey tournament at the 2022 Winter Olympics in Beijing. Her participation in 2010 at age 16 years, 294 days made her the second-youngest player to ever participate in the Olympic women's ice hockey tournament, after Anna Prugova (16 years, 85 days) of Russia, who also debuted at the 2010 Olympics.

Liu previously played in the Canadian Women's Hockey League (CWHL) with Kunlun Red Star WIH during the 2017–18 season and with the Shenzhen KRS Vanke Rays during the 2018–19 season, and in the Zhenskaya Hockey League (ZhHL) with the KRS Vanke Rays/Shenzhen KRS from the 2019–20 season through the 2022–23 season.

== Career statistics ==
=== Regular season and playoffs ===
			Regular season					Playoffs
Season	Team	League	GP	G	A	Pts	PIM	GP	G	A	Pts	PIM
2017–18	Kunlun Red Star	CWHL	28	3	3	6	12	4	0	0	0	4
2018–19	KRS Vanke Rays	CWHL	28	0	2	2	16	–	–	–	–	–
2019–20	KRS Vanke Rays	ZhHL	28	5	9	14	12	5	0	3	3	4
2021–22	KRS Vanke Rays	ZhHL	32	3	5	8	16	5	0	2	2	8
CWHL totals			56	3	5	8	28	4	0	0	0	4
ZhHL totals			60	8	14	22	28	10	0	5	5	12

=== International ===
Year	Team	Event	Result	GP	G	A	Pts	PIM
2010	China	OG	7th	5	0	0	0	4
2011	China	WW D1	5th	4	0	0	0	4
2011	China	AWG	3rd place, bronze medalist(s)	4	0	1	1	2
2012	China	CCOA	2nd place, silver medalist(s)	4	0	0	0	2
2012	China	WW D1B	2nd	5	2	0	2	4
2013	China	OGQ	DNQ	6	0	0	0	4
2013	China	WW D1B	4th	5	0	1	1	4
2014	China	CCOA	1st place, gold medalist(s)	4	0	1	1	8
2014	China	WW D1B	2nd	5	0	1	1	14
2015	China	WW D1B	3rd	5	0	5	5	2
2015	China	Uni	4th	5	3	3	6	4
2016	China	WW D1B	5th	5	1	0	1	2
2017	China	AWG	2nd place, silver medalist(s)	5	3	2	5	6
2018	China	WW D1B	5th	5	0	1	1	6
2019	China	WW D1B	4th	5	1	0	1	4
2022	China	OG	9th	4	0	0	0	0
2022	China	WW D1B	1st	5	2	9	11	2
