= Li Qianhua =

Chinese ice hockey player (born 2002)

- Born: 6 June 2002 (age 24) Yangdikou, Anxin, China
- Height: 165 cm (5 ft 5 in)
- Weight: 56 kg (123 lb; 8 st 11 lb)
- Position: Defence
- Shoots: Left
- WCIHL team Former teams: Hebei WHT; Shenzhen KRS
- National team: China
- Playing career: c. 2018–present

Li Qianhua
- Traditional Chinese: 李千華
- Simplified Chinese: 李千华
Transcriptions
Standard Mandarin
- Hanyu Pinyin: Lǐ Qiānhuá

Li Qianhua (Chinese: 李千华; born 6 June 2002) is a Chinese ice hockey defenseman and member of the Chinese national ice hockey team. She is captain of Hebei Provincial Women's Hockey Team, abbreviated Hebei WHT, in the Chinese Women's Ice Hockey League (WCIHL).

== Playing career ==
At age fourteen, Li was identified as a prime candidate to pursue ice hockey by Yu Weihua (于伟华), head coach of the nascent Hebei WHT. At that time, in late 2016, Li was a junior high school student focused on track and field and was entirely unfamiliar with ice hockey. After a series of training camps and team selections, Li was named to the first roster of Hebei WHT and committed to pursuing the sport.

Ahead of her first significant ice hockey tournament, the 13th National Games of China in August 2017, she was selected as an alternate captain of Hebei WHT, and went on to also participate in the 2018 National Ice Hockey Championship of China with Hebei WHT.

For the early part of the 2021–22 season, she joined the KRS Vanke Rays (renamed Shenzhen KRS in 2022) in the Russian Zhenskaya Hockey League (ZhHL) and recorded a +1 plus–minus across nine games played, though she did not score any points. The remainder of the season was played with Hebei WHT.

Li signed a contract for the 2022–23 season with KRS Shenzhen in the ZhHL, her first full season as a professional ice hockey player. Shenzhen KRS' defensive pairings were inconsistent throughout the season and she variously played on the third pair with Alexandra Pyrkova, Wang Jinyan, or Yu Baiwei; on the second pair with Du Sijia, or on the first pair with Kiana Wilkinson. She netted her first ZhHL goal on 24 November 2022, scoring the second goal in a game against Belye Medveditsy off of assists from Hannah Miller and Zhao Qinan; Shenzhen KRS ultimately won the game 6–2. Her first assist was notched on 18 February 2023, the secondary assist on a goal by Riley Houston against Biryusa Krasnoyarsk. At the conclusion of her rookie professional season, Li had recorded two points and 26 penalty minutes across 32 games.

Returning to Hebei WHT, she participated in the 14th Winter National Games of China in July 2023.

== International play ==
As a junior player with the Chinese national under-18 team, Li participated in the Division I Group B tournaments of the IIHF U18 Women's World Championship in 2019 and 2020. She served as an alternate captain at the 2020 tournament, where she was China's top scorer and led the tournament in assists, with four.

She was first selected to the senior national team in early 2020 and made her senior national team debut in the women's ice hockey tournament at the 2022 Winter Olympics in Beijing.

Li also represented China at the 2023 IIHF Women's World Championship Division I Group A.

== Personal life ==
Li was born in Yangdikou village (漾堤口村) in Anxin Town, Anxin County, Xiong'an, Hebei, China. Anxin County falls under the jurisdiction of the prefecture-level city of Baoding and Li is sometimes identified as being from Baoding as a result. Her mother is Liu Chang'e (刘常娥).

During primary school, she won regional awards in long jump and 800 metres. Her academic and athletic accomplishments to her being recruited by Baoding Sports School and she enrolled as a track and field student after completing primary school.
