= Emma Keenan =

Canadian ice hockey player (born 1997)

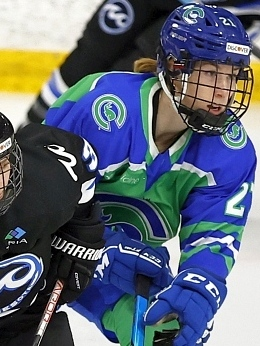
- Keenan with the Connecticut Whale in 2023
- Born: November 26, 1997 (age 27); Mission Viejo, California, U.S.
- Height: 5 ft 7 in (170 cm)
- Position: Defense
- Shoots: Left
- WCIHL team Former teams: Shenzhen KRS; Connecticut Whale; Buffalo Beauts; Göteborg HC
- Playing career: 2015–present

Emma Keenan (born November 26, 1997) is a Canadian-American professional ice hockey defenseman for the Shenzhen KRS of the Chinese Women's Ice Hockey League (WCIHL). She previously played for the Buffalo Beauts and Connecticut Whale of the Premier Hockey Federation (PHF) and Göteborg HC of the Swedish Women's Hockey League (SDHL). She played college ice hockey at Clarkson.

== Early life ==
Keenan was born in Mission Viejo, California, and raised in Calgary, Alberta. She has dual citizenship in Canada and the United States.

== College career ==
Keenan began her collegiate career at Clarkson during the 2015–16 season. During her freshman year, she recorded one goal and six assists in 40 games. During the 2016–17 season, in her sophomore year, she recorded six assists in 41 games, and helped lead Clarkson to the 2017 NCAA National Collegiate women's ice hockey tournament championship. During the 2017–18 season, in her junior year, she recorded five assists in 35 games, and helped lead Clarkson to the 2018 NCAA National Collegiate women's ice hockey tournament championship for the second consecutive year. During the 2018–19 season, in her senior year, she recorded a career-high three goals and 18 assists in 40 games.

== Professional career ==
Following her collegiate career, Keenan played two seasons with Göteborg HC of the SDHL and recorded 11 goals and 11 assists in 66 games. On June 10, 2021, she signed a one-year contract with the Buffalo Beauts of the PHF. During the 2021–22 season, she recorded three goals and three assists in 20 games. She then joined the Connecticut Whale for the 2022–23 season and recorded three goals and six assists in 24 games. In May 2023, she signed a one-year contract with the Montreal Force. The PHF ceased operations on June 29, 2023, as a result she never played a game for the Force.

Keenan joined PWHL Toronto as a reserve player during the 2023–24 season, however, she didn't appear in any games for the team. On August 26, 2024, she signed a one-year contract with Shenzhen KRS of the WCIHL.

== Personal life ==
Keenan was born to Fiona and Kevin Keenan, and has a brother, Ryan, and sister, Megan.

== Career statistics ==
			Regular season					Playoffs
Season	Team	League	GP	G	A	Pts	PIM	GP	G	A	Pts	PIM
2015–16	Clarkson University	ECAC	40	1	6	7	18	—	—	—	—	—
2016–17	Clarkson University	ECAC	41	0	6	6	20	—	—	—	—	—
2017–18	Clarkson University	ECAC	35	0	5	5	20	—	—	—	—
2018–19	Clarkson University	ECAC	40	3	18	21	36	—	—	—	—	—
2019–20	Göteborg HC	SDHL	36	9	8	17	40	—	—	—	—	—
2020–21	Göteborg HC	SDHL	30	2	3	5	40	—	—	—	—	—
2021–22	Buffalo Beauts	PHF	20	3	3	6	28	1	0	0	0	0
2022–23	Connecticut Whale	PHF	24	3	6	9	19	3	0	0	0	2
SDHL totals			66	11	11	22	80	—	—	—	—	—
PHF totals			44	6	9	15	47	4	0	0	0	2
