= Guan Yingying =

Chinese ice hockey player (born 1995)

- Born: 13 September 1995 (age 31) Shulan, Jilin, China
- Height: 167 cm (5 ft 6 in)
- Weight: 62 kg (137 lb; 9 st 11 lb)
- Position: Forward
- Shoots: Right
- WCIHL team Former teams: Qiqihar Landi; KRS Vanke Rays
- National team: China
- Playing career: c. 2011–present
Medal record
Asian Winter Games
Silver medal – second place	2017 Sapporo	Ice hockey
Challenge Cup of Asia
Bronze medal – third place	2012 Qiqihar

Guan Yingying
- Traditional Chinese: 管瑩瑩
- Simplified Chinese: 管莹莹
Transcriptions
Standard Mandarin
- Hanyu Pinyin: Guǎn Yíngyíng

Guan Yingying (simplified Chinese: 管莹莹; traditional Chinese: 管瑩瑩; pinyin: Guǎn Yíngyíng; born 13 September 1995) is a Chinese ice hockey forward and member of the Chinese national ice hockey team, currently playing in the Chinese Women's Ice Hockey League (WCIHL) with the Qiqihar Landi. She previously played in the Zhenskaya Hockey League (ZhHL) with the KRS Vanke Rays.

Guan represented China in the women's ice hockey tournament at the 2022 Winter Olympics in Beijing.

== Playing career ==
Guan began playing ice hockey in 2007. She started playing professional ice hockey in 2021, joining the KRS Vanke Rays.

She was captain of the Chinese team at the Winter Universiades in 2015, 2017, and 2019, losing in the bronze medal match in both 2015 and 2017. She won a silver medal at the 2017 Asian Winter Games as part of the Chinese ice hockey team. She was a member of the Chinese team at the 2022 Winter Olympics.
