= Zhu Rui (ice hockey) =

Chinese ice hockey player (born 1998)

- Born: 23 April 1998 (age 28) Harbin, Heilongjiang, China
- Height: 162 cm (5 ft 4 in)
- Weight: 58 kg (128 lb; 9 st 2 lb)
- Position: Forward
- Shoots: Left
- WCIHL team Former teams: Shenzhen KRS; Kunlun Red Star WIH; Harbin IHC
- National team: China
- Playing career: c. 2013–present
Medal record
Asian Winter Games
Silver medal – second place	2017 Sapporo	Ice hockey
Challenge Cup of Asia
Gold medal – first place	2014 Harbin

Zhu Rui
- Traditional Chinese: 朱瑞
- Simplified Chinese: 朱瑞
Transcriptions
Standard Mandarin
- Hanyu Pinyin: Zhū Ruì

Zhu Rui (Chinese: 朱瑞; born 23 April 1998) is a Chinese ice hockey player and member of the Chinese national ice hockey team, currently playing in the Chinese Women's Ice Hockey League (WCIHL) with Shenzhen KRS. She previously played in the Canadian Women's Hockey League (CWHL) with Kunlun Red Star WIH in the 2017–18 season and the Shenzhen KRS Vanke Rays in the 2018–19 season, and in the Zhenskaya Hockey League (ZhHL) with the KRS Vanke Rays.

Zhu represented China in the women's ice hockey tournament at the 2022 Winter Olympics in Beijing.

== Career statistics ==
=== International ===
Year	Team	Event	Result	GP	G	A	Pts	PIM
2013	China U18	WC18 D1Q	5th	5	1	2	3	2
2014	China	CCOA	1st place, gold medalist(s)	4	1	0	1	2
2014	China	WC D1B	2nd	5	1	0	1	2
2014	China U18	WC18 D1Q	3rd	4	1	2	3	2
2015	China	WC D1B	3rd	5	1	0	1	14
2016	China U18	WC18 D1Q	5th	4	5	2	7	2
2016	China	WC D1B	5th	5	0	0	0	0
2016	China	OGQ	DNQ	3	0	0	0	2
2017	China	AWG	2nd place, silver medalist(s)	5	0	3	3	0
2017	China	WC D1B	4th	5	0	0	0	4
2018	China	WC D1B	5th	5	0	2	2	0
2019	China	WC D1B	4th	4	0	2	2	2
2022	China	OG	9th	4	0	0	0	0
2022	China	WC D1B	1st	5	1	4	5	2
2023	China	WC D1A	1st	5	0	1	1	0
Junior totals				13	7	6	13	6
Senior totals				52	4	12	16	26

Note: Statistics from Olympic qualification tournaments not included in career totals
