= China women's national ice hockey team =

China
- Nickname: 女龙 (Lady Dragons)
- Association: Chinese Ice Hockey Association
- General manager: Wang Xuan; Zhao Jianuan
- Head coach: Wang Dahai
- Assistants: Wang Benyu; Zhang Jing
- Captain: Zhao Qinan
- Most games: Yu Baiwei (120)
- Top scorer: Sun Rui (62)
- Most points: Sun Rui (104)
- Team colors
- IIHF code: CHN
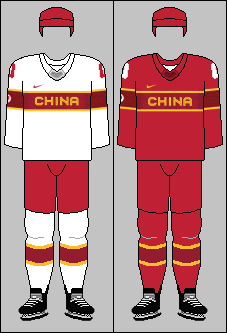

Ranking
- Current IIHF: 14 ▼2 (3 June 2026)
- Highest IIHF: 7 (first in 2003)
- Lowest IIHF: 20 (first in 2018)

First international
- China 10–0 Japan (Harbin, China; 1 January 1991)

Biggest win
- China 30–1 South Korea (Misawa, Japan; 31 January 2003)

Biggest defeat
- United States 16–0 China (San Jose, United States; 22 January 2002)

Olympics
- Appearances: 4 (first in 1998)

World Championships
- Appearances: 24 (first in 1992)
- Best result: 4th (1994, 1997)

Asian Winter Games
- Appearances: 5 (first in 1996)
- Best result: Gold (1996, 1999)

Challenge Cup of Asia
- Appearances: 4 (first in 2010)
- Best result: (gold) (2010, 2014)

International record (W–L–T)
- 126–167–13

China women's national ice hockey team
- Traditional Chinese: 中國國家女子冰球隊
- Simplified Chinese: 中国国家女子冰球队
Transcriptions
Standard Mandarin
- Hanyu Pinyin: Zhōngguó Guójiā Nǚzǐ Bīngqiú Duì

The Chinese women's national ice hockey team (Chinese: 中国国家女子冰球队) represents China at the International Ice Hockey Federation (IIHF) Women's World Championship, the Asian Winter Games, and other international competitions. The women's national team is governed by the Chinese Ice Hockey Association. China's national women's program is ranked twentieth in the world by the IIHF and has 808 active players as of 2020.

== History ==
China reached their hey day of women's hockey in the mid-90s when they finished as high as 4th place mostly thanks to the "Great Wall of China" goaltender, Guo Hong, who is now retired. China had 174 women's ice hockey players in 2011.

Motivated to gain exposure to a more challenging level of competition, the Chinese national team competed in the Naisten SM-sarja, the premier women's league in Finland, for thirteen games in the 2005–06 season and for twelve games in the 2006–07 season.

=== 2022 Winter Olympics ===
In 2022, China competed in the 2022 Winter Olympics as the host nation. Going into the tournament, they relied heavily on the development of players on the Vanke Rays team and were seen as having a real chance at making the quarterfinals. They lost their opening game to Czech Republic, before defeating the lowest ranked qualifier, Denmark, and Japan in a shootout which was enough for Japan to clinch a playoff berth. Going into their last game against Sweden, a point would have been enough to secure a quarterfinal berth, but after taking the lead, the Chinese lost 2–1 against the Swedes. They were formally eliminated after Sweden beat Denmark in the last game of Group B.

=== World Championships ===
Only two months after the Winter Olympics, they played in the 2022 IIHF Women's World Championship Division IB in Katowice, Poland. They ended up dominating the competition, scoring 38 goals in the group to secure promotion to the 2023 IIHF Women's World Championship Division IA. In November 2022, they were given the hosting rights to the group. Nine months later, they would end up winning the Division IA tournament and be promoted to the 2024 IIHF Women's World Championship after defeating Austria 2–0 in Shenzhen. This will be China's first appearance in the top tier since 2009.

== Tournament record ==
=== Olympic Games ===
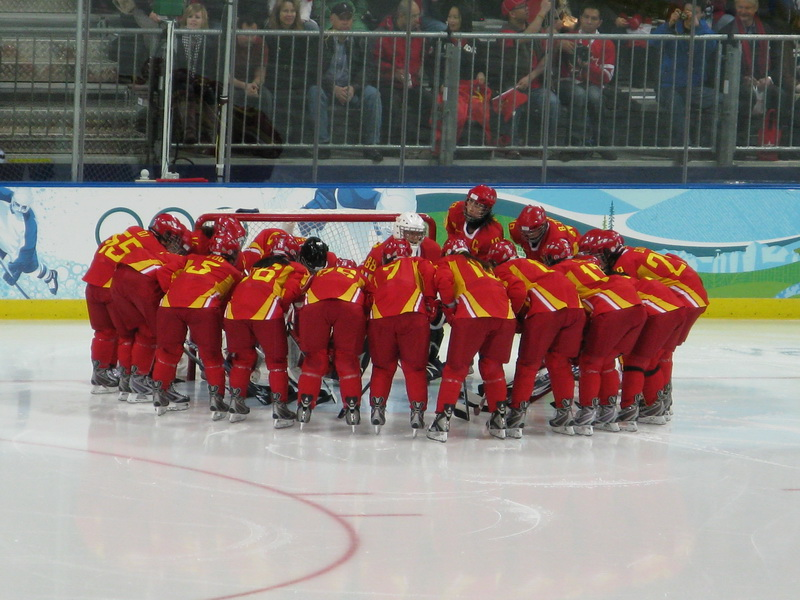
The Chinese women's ice hockey team huddles before their game against Russia at the 2010 Winter Olympics.

- 1998 – Finished in 4th place
- 2002 – Finished in 7th place
- 2010 – Finished in 7th place
- 2022 – Finished in 9th place

=== World Championship ===
- 1992 – Finished in 5th place
- 1994 – Finished in 4th place
- 1997 – Finished in 4th place
- 1999 – Finished in 5th place
- 2000 – Finished in 6th place
- 2001 – Finished in 6th place
- 2003 – No result, the competition was cancelled due to SARS epidemic
- 2004 – Finished in 7th place
- 2005 – Finished in 6th place
- 2007 – Finished in 6th place
- 2008 – Finished in 8th place
- 2009 – Finished in 9th place (relegated to Division I)
- 2011 – Finished in 13th place (5th in Division I, relegated to Division IB)
- 2012 – Finished in 16th place (2nd in Division IB)
- 2013 – Finished in 18th place (4th in Division IB)
- 2014 – Finished in 16th place (2nd in Division IB)
- 2015 – Finished in 17th place (3rd in Division IB)
- 2016 – Finished in 19th place (5th in Division IB)
- 2017 – Finished in 18th place (4th in Division IB)
- 2018 – Finished in 20th place (5th in Division IB)
- 2019 – Finished in 20th place (4th in Division IB)
- 2020 – Cancelled due to the COVID-19 pandemic
- 2021 – Cancelled due to the COVID-19 pandemic
- 2022 – Finished in 16th place (1st in Division IB, promoted to Division IA)
- 2023 – Finished in 11th place (1st in Division IA, promoted to World Championship)
- 2024 – Finished in 9th place (relegated to Division I)
- 2025 – Finished in 15th place (5th in Division IA)
- 2026 – Finished in 16th place (6th in Division IA, relegated to Division IB)

=== Asian Games ===
- 1996 – 1st (gold)
- 1999 – 1st (gold)
- 2003 – 3rd (bronze)
- 2007 – 3rd (bronze)
- 2011 – 3rd (bronze)
- 2017 – 2nd (silver)
- 2025 – 3rd (bronze)

=== IIHF Asia Championship ===
- 2025 – 2nd (silver)
- 2026 – 2nd (silver)
- 2027 – 2nd (silver)

=== IIHF Challenge Cup of Asia ===
- 2010 – 1st (gold)
- 2011 – 2nd (silver)
- 2012 – 2nd (silver)
- 2014 – 1st (gold)

=== Pacific Rim Championship ===
- 1995 – 3rd
- 1996 – 3rd

== Team ==
=== Current roster ===
The roster for the Group A tournament of the 2025 IIHF Women's World Championship Division I.

Head coach: Jin Tairi
Assistant coaches: Zhang Jing, Xie Ming (goaltender)

No.	Pos.	Name	Height	Weight	Birthdate	Team
1	G	Lai Guimin	1.66 m (5 ft 5 in)	65 kg (143 lb)	9 April 2001 (age 25)	(China) Beijing
2	D	Yu Baiwei – C	1.66 m (5 ft 5 in)	71 kg (157 lb)	17 July 1988 (age 38)	(China) Kunlun Red Star
3	F	Zhu Rui	1.62 m (5 ft 4 in)	58 kg (128 lb)	23 April 1998 (age 28)	(China) Kunlun Red Star
4	F	Yang Jinglei	1.72 m (5 ft 8 in)	62 kg (137 lb)	28 July 2005 (age 21)	(China) Kunlun Red Star
5	D	Han Xiang	1.72 m (5 ft 8 in)	65 kg (143 lb)	21 July 2004 (age 22)	(China) Beijing
6	F	Li Qianhua	1.65 m (5 ft 5 in)	63 kg (139 lb)	6 June 2002 (age 24)	(China) Hebei
7	F	Zhang Mengying – A	1.70 m (5 ft 7 in)	65 kg (143 lb)	22 December 1993 (age 32)	(China) Beijing
8	D	Deng Di	1.62 m (5 ft 4 in)	67 kg (148 lb)	17 October 1996 (age 30)	(China) Beijing
9	F	Kong Minghui	1.65 m (5 ft 5 in)	57 kg (126 lb)	21 April 1992 (age 34)	(China) Kunlun Red Star
10	F	Wu Sijia	1.66 m (5 ft 5 in)	55 kg (121 lb)	19 May 2007 (age 19)	(China) Beijing
11	D	Li Wenjia	1.73 m (5 ft 8 in)	79 kg (174 lb)	6 September 2003 (age 23)	(China) Hebei
12	F	Zhao Ziyu	1.73 m (5 ft 8 in)	61 kg (134 lb)	16 May 2007 (age 19)	(China) Sichuan
13	D	Zhao Qinan – A	1.71 m (5 ft 7 in)	60 kg (130 lb)	29 August 1997 (age 29)	(China) Kunlun Red Star
14	F	Guan Yingying	1.67 m (5 ft 6 in)	63 kg (139 lb)	13 September 1995 (age 31)	(China) Beijing
15	D	Tian Yuwei	1.67 m (5 ft 6 in)	65 kg (143 lb)	18 May 2004 (age 22)	(China) Beijing
16	F	Hu Jiayi	1.65 m (5 ft 5 in)	55 kg (121 lb)	30 September 2006 (age 20)	(China) Beijing
17	F	Qu Yue	1.73 m (5 ft 8 in)	65 kg (143 lb)	8 January 2004 (age 22)	(China) Kunlun Red Star
18	F	Wen Lu	1.60 m (5 ft 3 in)	58 kg (128 lb)	21 April 1994 (age 32)	(China) Kunlun Red Star
19	D	Du Sijia	1.66 m (5 ft 5 in)	58 kg (128 lb)	7 August 2002 (age 24)	(China) Beijing
20	G	Wang Yuqing	1.69 m (5 ft 7 in)	58 kg (128 lb)	6 May 1994 (age 32)	(China) Kunlun Red Star
23	F	Fang Xin	1.70 m (5 ft 7 in)	57 kg (126 lb)	10 May 1994 (age 32)	(China) Kunlun Red Star
24	F	Wang Jiaxin	1.63 m (5 ft 4 in)	56 kg (123 lb)	1 March 2006 (age 20)	(China) Kunlun Red Star
29	G	Zhan Jiahui	1.75 m (5 ft 9 in)	75 kg (165 lb)	4 April 2006 (age 20)	(United States) Dartmouth Big Green

=== Head coaches ===
- Yu Zaizhou, –1995
- Yao Naifeng, 1995–1999
- Zhang Zhinan, 1999–2000
- Yao Naifeng, 2000–2003
- Jan Votruba, 2003–2004
- Paul Strople, 2004–2005
- Ryan Stone, 2005–2006
- Jorma Siitarinen, 2006–2007
- Steve Carlyle, 2007–2008
- Paul Strople, 2008–2009
- Hannu Saintula, 2009–2011
- Mikhail Chekanov, 2011–2012
- Wang Jingang, 2012
- Zhang Zhinan, 2013
- Wang Jingang, 2013–2015
- Rick Seeley, 2015–2019
- Brian Idalski, 2019–2022
- Scott Spencer, 2023–2024
- Jin Tairi, 2025–

== Players ==
=== Notable players ===
- Guo Hong, G
- Jin Fengling, F
- Li Qianhua (李千华), D
- Liu Hongmei (刘红梅), F
- Sun Rui, F
- Wang Linuo, F
- Yang Xiuqing (杨秀青), F

=== Individual all-time records ===
Still active players are highlighted

Most games played
Player	Position	Time	GP
Sun Rui	F	1999–13	46
Wang Linuo	F	1999–10	46
Li Xuan	D	1992–04	45
Lu Yan	D	1992–04	45
Sang Hong	F	1994–08	44
Zhang Jing	F	1997–07	44
Guo Hong	G	1992–04	42
Liu Hongmei	F	1992–02	41
Jin Fengling	F	2000–12	41
Ma Xiaojun	F	1997–05	40

Most goals
Player	Position	Time	G
Liu Hongmei	F	1992–02	27
Sun Rui	F	1999–13	25
Sang Hong	F	1994–08	14
Zhang Lan	F	1992–99	9
Guo Wei	F	1992–98	8
Jin Fengling	F	2000–12	8
Dang Hong	F	1992–98	7
Yang Xiuqing	F	1997–02	7
Wang Linuo	F	1999–10	7
Zhang Jing	F	1997–07	6

Most points
Player	Position	Time	PTS
Liu Hongmei	F	1992–02	44
Sun Rui	F	1999–13	39
Zhang Lan	F	1992–99	19
Guo Wei	F	1992–98	18
Jin Fengling	F	2000–12	18
Sang Hong	F	1994–08	16
Dang Hong	F	1992–98	15
Wang Linuo	F	1999–10	15
Lu Yan	D	1992–04	14
Yang Xiuqing	F	1997–02	13

Note: World Championships (excluding Division I) and Olympics only

== All-time record against other nations ==
Last match update: 11 March 2022

Key
Positive balance (more Wins)
Neutral balance (Wins = Losses)
Negative balance (more Losses)

Team	GP	W	T	L	GF	GA
South Korea	11	10	0	1	107	9
North Korea	10	9	0	1	49	19
Kazakhstan	20	12	3	5	66	27
Norway	8	6	0	2	41	15
Great Britain	3	3	0	0	14	1
Japan	38	20	0	18	122	96
Poland	4	3	0	1	14	4
Hungary	5	3	0	2	13	15
Denmark	5	3	0	2	13	19
Hong Kong	1	1	0	0	20	0
Thailand	1	1	0	0	15	0
Australia	1	1	0	0	5	0
Austria	1	1	0	0	4	3
France	10	5	0	5	37	32
Slovakia	8	4	0	4	16	21
Italy	6	3	0	3	12	12
Czech Republic	3	1	0	2	7	9
Netherlands	7	3	0	4	22	23
Switzerland	14	6	1	7	43	44
Russia	14	4	2	8	31	38
Latvia	9	2	0	7	16	25
Sweden	11	1	2	8	18	50
Germany	21	3	4	14	28	62
Canada	13	0	0	13	9	89
Finland	15	0	0	15	18	67
United States	22	0	0	22	20	181
Total	261	105	12	144	760	861

== Notables ==
=== Matches ===
First match
20 April 1992: 1992 IIHF Women's World Championship in Tampere, Finland. Canada 8–0 China
Largest victory
28 January 2003: 2003 Asian Winter Games in Misawa, Japan. China 30–1 South Korea
Largest defeat
3 April 2001: 2001 Women's World Championship in Minneapolis, United States. United States 13–0 China
Most goals for
28 January 2003: 2003 Asian Winter Games in Misawa, Japan. China 30–1 South Korea
Most goals against
15 April 1994: 1994 IIHF Women's World Championship in Lake Placid, United States. United States 14–3 China
First shutout for
8 April 1995: 1995 Women's Pacific Rim Championship in San Jose, United States. China 5–0 Japan
First shutout against
20 April 1992: 1992 IIHF Women's World Championship in Tampere, Finland. Canada 8–0 China
First shutout tie
5 April 2001: 2001 IIHF Women's World Championship in Minneapolis, United States. China 0–0 Germany
First win
23 April 1992: 1992 IIHF Women's World Championship in Tampere, Finland. China 5–2 Denmark
First loss
20 April 1992: 1992 IIHF Women's World Championship in Tampere, Finland. Canada 8–0 China
First tie
12 April 1994: 1994 IIHF Women's World Championship in Lake Placid, United States. China 4–4 Sweden
Highest scoring tie
16 February 2002: 2002 Winter Olympics in Salt Lake City, United States. China 5–5 Germany
Lowest scoring tie
5 April 2001: 2001 IIHF Women's World Championship in Minneapolis, United States. China 0–0 Germany

=== Rankings ===
First IIHF World Ranking
7th (2003)
Highest IIHF World Ranking
7th (2005, 2006, 2009, 2010)
Lowest world ranking
13th (2012)
First Olympic qualification attempt
1998 Winter Olympics
First Olympic qualification
1998 Winter Olympics
Best Olympic finish
4th (1998 Winter Olympics)
Worst Olympic finish
Did not qualify (2006 Winter Olympics)
First world championship competition
1992
Highest world championship competition finish
4th (1994, 1997)
Lowest world championship competition finish
16th (2012)

== See also ==
- China men's national ice hockey team
- Ice hockey in China
- Chinese Ice Hockey Championship
- Beijing International Ice Hockey League
- Asia League Ice Hockey
- Supreme Hockey League
- Kontinental Hockey League
