= Dang Hong =

Chinese ice hockey player and coach

- Born: 28 January 1969 (age 57)
- Height: 168 cm (5 ft 6 in)
- Weight: 60 kg (132 lb; 9 st 6 lb)
- Position: Forward
- Played for: Harbin Ice Hockey
- Current WCIHL coach: Harbin Bailiwei
- National team: China
- Playing career: c. 1996–1998

Dang Hong
- Traditional Chinese: 黨紅
- Simplified Chinese: 党红
Transcriptions
Standard Mandarin
- Hanyu Pinyin: Dǎng Hóng

Dang Hong (Chinese: 党 红; born 28 January 1969) is a Chinese retired ice hockey player and the head coach of Harbin Bailiwei in the Chinese Women's Ice Hockey League (WCIHL). She served as captain of the Chinese national team at the 1997 IIHF Women's World Championship and competed in the women's ice hockey tournament at the 1998 Winter Olympics in Nagano.

== Career statistics ==
Note: GP = Games played; G = Goals; A = Assists; Pts = Points; PIM = Penalty minutes;

				Regular season
Year	Team	Event	Result	GP	G	A	Pts	PIM
1997	China	WC	4th	5	3	2	5	0
1998	China	OG	4th	6	0	0	0	0
