= Michelle Weis =

Danish ice hockey player (born 1997)

- Born: 10 April 1997 (age 29) Charlottenlund, Denmark
- Height: 169 cm (5 ft 7 in)
- Weight: 58 kg (128 lb; 9 st 2 lb)
- Position: Centre
- Shoots: Left
- SDHL team Damettan team Former teams: Djurgårdens IF (L); Malmö Redhawks; Maine Black Bears; Luleå HF/MSSK; Hvidovre IK; IC Gentofte; Rødovre SIK
- National team: Denmark
- Playing career: 2009–present

Michelle Weis (born 10 April 1997) is a Danish ice hockey player and member of the Danish national ice hockey team, currently playing with Djurgårdens IF Hockey of the Swedish Women's Hockey League (SDHL) on loan from the Malmö Redhawks Dam of the Swedish Damettan.

== Playing career ==
Weis' club career began when she debuted in the DM i ishockey for kvinder with Rødovre SIK at age 12. Remaining in the Danish leagues through most of her teenage years, she also played seasons with IC Gentofte and Hvidovre IK in the DM for kvinder, and with the men's under-17 and under-20 junior teams of IC Gentofte. In the 2015–16 season, she was loaned by Hvidovre IK to Luleå HF/MSSK of the Riksserien (renamed SDHL in 2016) in preparation for the playoffs, ultimately winning the 2016 Swedish Championship with the team. She then signed with Luleå for the 2016–17 season.

At 19, she joined the Maine Black Bears women's ice hockey program in the Hockey East (WHEA) conference of the NCAA Division I. As a rookie in the 2017–18 season, Weis registered 21 points (9+12) in 35 games and earned Hockey East's Pro-Ambitions Rookie of the Week honors for the week of 2 October.

== International play ==
Weis has represented Denmark at seven IIHF Women's World Championships: at the Top Division tournament in 2021, Denmark's first Top Division tournament since 1992, and at the Division I Group A tournaments in 2013, 2014, 2015, 2016, 2018, and 2019. She was Denmark's second leading scorer in the Olympic qualification for the women's ice hockey tournament at the 2022 Winter Olympics, at which Denmark qualified to participate in the Olympic Games for the first time in team history.

As a junior player with the Danish national under-18 team, Weis participated in the Division I Qualification tournament of the IIHF Women's U18 World Championships in 2015. She tied with Kamila Wieczorek of Poland as top scorer of the tournament, ranking first in goals (8), assists (5), and points (13), and was selected by the coaches as Denmark's best player of the tournament.
