= Wang Yuqing (ice hockey) =

Chinese ice hockey goaltender

- Born: 6 May 1994 (age 32) Harbin, Heilongjiang, China
- Height: 169 cm (5 ft 7 in)
- Weight: 55 kg (121 lb; 8 st 9 lb)
- Position: Goaltender
- Catches: Left
- WCIHL team Former teams: Shenzhen KRS; KRS Vanke Rays; Kunlun Red Star WIH; Harbin IHC
- National team: China
- Playing career: c. 2012–present
Medal record
Asian Winter Games
Silver medal – second place	2017 Sapporo	Ice hockey
Challenge Cup of Asia
Gold medal – first place	2014 Harbin
Silver medal – second place	2012 Qiqihar

Wang Yuqing
- Traditional Chinese: 王雨晴
- Simplified Chinese: 王雨晴
Transcriptions
Standard Mandarin
- Hanyu Pinyin: Wáng Yǔqíng

Wang Yuqing (Chinese: 王雨晴; born 6 May 1994) is a Chinese ice hockey goaltender and member of the Chinese national team, currently playing in the Chinese Women's Ice Hockey League (ZhHL) with the Shenzhen KRS. She previously played in the Canadian Women's Hockey League (CWHL) with Kunlun Red Star WIH and in the Zhenskaya Hockey League (ZhHL) with the KRS Vanke Rays.

Wang represented China in the women's ice hockey tournament at the 2022 Winter Olympics in Beijing.

== Career statistics ==
=== International ===
Year	Team	Event	Result	GP	W	L	MIN	GA	SO	GAA	SV%
2012	China U18	WW18 D1Q	3rd	5	2	2	262:46	12	0	2.74	.914
2012	China	CCOA	2nd place, silver medalist(s)	2	1	0	60:19	0	1	0.00	1.00
2013	China	WW D1B	4th	2	0	0	5:11	0	0	0.00	1.00
2014	China	CCOA	1st place, gold medalist(s)	2	4	0	206:03	2	0	0.58	.967
2014	China	WW D1B	2nd	5	3	2	293:13	13	1	2.66	.927
2015	China	Uni	4th	5	2	3	231:01	10	0	2.60	.927
2015	China	WW D1B	3rd	2	0	0	27:11	1	0	2.21	.900
2016	China	WW D1B	5th	5	2	3	298:42	9	0	1.81	.933
2016	China	OGQ	DNQ	2	0	1	99:01	3	0	1.82	.927
2017	China	Uni	4th	2	0	1	50:05	7	0	8.39	.821
2017	China	AWG	2nd place, silver medalist(s)	5	1	1	218:19	8	0	2.20	.889
2017	China	WW D1B	4th	5	2	2	303:46	6	2	1.19	.946
2018	China	WW D1B	5th	5	2	3	296:51	6	1	1.21	.944
2019	China	WW D1B	4th	5	2	1	179:54	6	1	2.00	.903
2022	China	OG	9th	0	–	–	0:00	–	–	–	–
2022	China	WW D1B	1st	1	0	0	20:00	0	0	0.00	1.00
