= Zhang Mengying =

Chinese ice hockey player

- Born: 22 December 1993 (age 32) Qiqihar, Heilongjiang, China
- Height: 1.70 m (5 ft 7 in)
- Weight: 68 kg (150 lb; 10 st 10 lb)
- Position: Forward
- Shoots: Left
- WCIHL team Former teams: Beijing Swift; KRS Vanke Rays; Qiqihar Ice Hockey
- National team: China
- Playing career: 2009–present
Medal record
Asian Winter Games
Silver medal – second place	2017 Sapporo	Ice hockey
Bronze medal – third place	2011 Astana-Almaty	Ice hockey
Challenge Cup of Asia
Gold medal – first place	2014 Harbin

Zhang Mengying
- Traditional Chinese: 張夢瑩
- Simplified Chinese: 张梦莹
Transcriptions
Standard Mandarin
- Hanyu Pinyin: Zhāng Mèngyíng
Yue: Cantonese
- Yale Romanization: Jēung Muhngyìhng

Zhang Mengying (simplified Chinese: 张梦莹; traditional Chinese: 張夢瑩; pinyin: Zhāng Mèngyíng; born 22 December 1993) is a Chinese ice hockey player and member of the Chinese national ice hockey team. She currently plays in the Chinese Women's Ice Hockey League (WCIHL) with the Beijing Swift.

A two time Olympian, Zhang represented China in the women's ice hockey tournament at the 2010 Winter Olympics in Vancouver, where she was the youngest player on the Chinese roster, and in the women's ice hockey tournament at the 2022 Winter Olympics in Beijing. She is a two-time Asian Winter Games medalist, having won bronze at the 2011 Asian Winter Games and silver at the 2017 Asian Winter Games, and was a gold medalist at the 2014 IIHF Women's Challenge Cup of Asia. As a member of the national team, she has also participated in eight IIHF Women's World Championships at the Division I and Division I B levels, and in the women's ice hockey tournaments at the Universiades in 2015 and 2017.
