= Zhao Qinan =

Chinese ice hockey player (born 1997)

- Born: 29 August 1997 (age 29) Harbin, Heilongjiang, China
- Height: 171 cm (5 ft 7 in)
- Weight: 60 kg (132 lb; 9 st 6 lb)
- Position: Defence
- Shoots: Left
- WCIHL team Former teams: Shenzhen KRS: KRS Vanke Rays; Vanke Rays; Harbin IHC
- National team: China
- Playing career: c. 2013–present
Medal record
Asian Winter Games
Silver medal – second place	2017 Sapporo	Ice hockey
Challenge Cup of Asia
Gold medal – first place	2014 Harbin

Zhao Qinan
- Traditional Chinese: 趙啟男
- Simplified Chinese: 赵启男
Transcriptions
Standard Mandarin
- Hanyu Pinyin: Zhào Qǐnán

Zhao Qinan (Chinese: 赵启男; born 29 August 1997) is a Chinese ice hockey player and member of the Chinese national ice hockey team, currently playing in the Chinese Women's Ice Hockey League with Shenzhen KRS. She previously played with the KRS Vanke Rays in the 2021–22 season of the Zhenskaya Hockey League (ZhHL) and previously played in the Canadian Women's Hockey League (CWHL) with the Vanke Rays in the 2017–18 season and the Shenzhen KRS Vanke Rays in the 2018–19 season.

Zhao represented China in the women's ice hockey tournament at the 2022 Winter Olympics in Beijing.
