= Fang Xin (ice hockey) =

Chinese ice hockey player (born 1994)

- Born: 10 May 1994 (age 32) Harbin, Heilongjiang, China
- Height: 170 cm (5 ft 7 in)
- Weight: 54 kg (119 lb; 8 st 7 lb)
- Position: Forward
- Shoots: Left
- WCIHL team Former teams: Shenzhen KRS; Vanke Rays
- National team: China
- Playing career: c. 2010–present
Medal record
Asian Winter Games
Silver medal – second place	2017 Sapporo	Ice hockey
Bronze medal – third place	2011 Astana-Almaty	Ice hockey
Challenge Cup of Asia
Gold medal – first place	2014 Harbin
Silver medal – second place	2012 Qiqihar

Fang Xin
- Traditional Chinese: 方新
- Simplified Chinese: 方新
Transcriptions
Standard Mandarin
- Hanyu Pinyin: Fāng Xīn

Fang Xin (Chinese: 方新; born 10 May 1994), also known by the Western name Turbo, is a Chinese ice hockey player and member of the Chinese national ice hockey team, currently playing in the Chinese Women's Ice Hockey League (WCIHL) with the Shenzhen KRS.

Fang represented China in the women's ice hockey tournament at the 2022 Winter Olympics in Beijing.
