= 2011 IIHF Women's World Championship Division I =

Tournament details
- Host country: Germany
- City: Ravensburg
- Venue: 1 (in 1 host city)
- Dates: 11–16 April 2011
- Teams: 6

The 2011 IIHF Women's World Championship Division I was an international ice hockey tournament organized by the International Ice Hockey Federation. It was played in Ravensburg, Germany, from 11 to 16 April 2011. Division I represented the second tier of the IIHF Women's World Championship.

The winner of this tournament was promoted to the Top Division for the 2012 championship, while the last-placed team in the group was relegated to Division I B. Divisional championships changed titles for the 2012 season, so this tournament became Division I A, and Division II became Division I B.

On 29 March 2011, Japan withdrew from the tournament due to the 2011 Japan earthquake. They retained their place in the 2012's Division I A, while the fifth placed team was relegated to Division I B.

== Participating teams ==
Team	Qualification
~~Japan~~	placed 8th in 2009 Top Division and were relegated; withdrew from 2011 tournament
China	placed 9th in 2009 Top Division and were relegated
Germany	hosts; placed 2nd in 2009 Division I
Norway	placed 3rd in 2009 Division I
Austria	placed 4th in 2009 Division I
Latvia	placed 1st in 2009 Division II and were promoted

== Final standings ==
Pos	Team	Pld	W	OTW	OTL	L	GF	GA	GD	Pts	Promotion, qualification or relegation
1	Germany (H)	4	4	0	0	0	12	2	+10	12	Promoted to the 2012 Top Division
2	Norway	4	3	0	0	1	13	7	+6	9	Qualified for the 2012 Division I A
3	Latvia	4	1	0	0	3	5	7	−2	3	Qualified for the 2012 Division I A
4	Austria	4	1	0	0	3	6	12	−6	3	Qualified for the 2012 Division I A
5	China	4	1	0	0	3	8	16	−8	3	Relegated to the 2012 Division I B
–	~~Japan~~	0	0	0	0	0	0	0	0	0	Withdrawn; qualified for the 2012 Division I A

Source: IIHF
(H) Host

== Match results ==
All times are local (Central European Summer Time – UTC+2).

11 April 2011; 16:00	Norway	7–3 (3–1, 2–0, 2–2)	China	Ravensburg Ice Rink

Game reference

11 April 2011; 19:30	Austria	0–4 (0–0, 0–1, 0–3)	Germany	Ravensburg Ice Rink

Game reference

13 April 2011; 16:00	China	4–3 (2–3, 2–0, 0–0)	Austria	Ravensburg Ice Rink

Game reference

13 April 2011; 19:30	Germany	2–1 (1–1, 1–0, 0–0)	Latvia	Ravensburg Ice Rink

Game reference

14 April 2011; 16:00	China	1–3 (0–3, 1–0, 0–0)	Latvia	Ravensburg Ice Rink

Game reference

14 April 2011; 19:30	Norway	3–1 (0–0, 1–1, 2–0)	Austria	Ravensburg Ice Rink

Game reference

16 April 2011; 16:00	Latvia	0–2 (0–1, 0–0, 0–1)	Norway	Ravensburg Ice Rink

Game reference

16 April 2011; 19:30	China	0–3 (0–0, 0–1, 0–2)	Germany	Ravensburg Ice Rink

Game reference

17 April 2011; 10:00	Austria	2–1 (1–0, 1–0, 0–1)	Latvia	Ravensburg Ice Rink

Game reference

17 April 2011; 13:30	Germany	3–1 (0–0, 0–0, 3–1)	Norway	Ravensburg Ice Rink

Game reference

== Statistics ==
=== Scoring leaders ===
Pos	Player	Country	GP	G	A	Pts	+/−	PIM
1	Line Bialik Øien	Norway	4	0	7	7	+3	0
2	Esther Kantor	Austria	4	2	3	5	+1	2
3	Monika Bittner	Germany	4	4	0	4	+5	2
4	Andrea Dalen	Norway	4	2	2	4	+3	2
4	Inese Geca-Miljone	Latvia	4	2	2	4	+1	0
4	Silje Holøs	Norway	4	2	2	4	+3	4
4	Eva-Marie Schwärzler	Austria	4	2	2	4	0	0
4	Henriette Sletbak	Norway	4	2	2	4	+1	8
9	Susann Götz	Germany	4	1	3	4	+4	2
10	Sophie Kratzer	Germany	4	1	3	4	+6	2

GP = Games played; G = Goals; A = Assists; Pts = Points; +/− = Plus-minus; PIM = Penalties In Minutes

=== Goaltending leaders ===
(minimum 40% team's total ice time)

Pos	Player	Country	TOI	GA	GAA	Sv%	SO
1	Viona Harrer	Germany	180:00	1	0.33	98.44	2
2	Jorid Dagfinrud	Norway	120:00	1	0.50	97.30	1
3	Lolita Andrisevska	Latvia	240:00	7	1.75	95.93	0
4	Sandra Borschke	Austria	199:52	8	2.40	91.67	0
5	Christine Smestad	Norway	119:44	5	2.51	89.36	0

TOI = Time on ice (minutes:seconds); GA = Goals against; GAA = Goals against average; Sv% = Save percentage; SO = Shutouts

=== Directorate Awards ===
- Goaltender: Lolita Andrisevska, Latvia
- Defenseman: Susann Götz, Germany
- Forward: Line Bialik Øien, Norway
