= Vanke Rays =

CWHL ice hockey team in Shenzhen, China

- City: Shenzhen, Guangdong, China
- League: Canadian Women's Hockey League
- Founded: 2017
- Folded: 2018
- Home arena: Shenzhen Dayun Arena
- Colors: Red, white
- General manager: Shirley Hon
- Head coach: Rob Morgan
- Website: Official website (archived)

Shenzhen Vanke Rays
- Traditional Chinese: 深圳万科陽光
- Simplified Chinese: 深圳万科阳光
Transcriptions
Standard Mandarin
- Hanyu Pinyin: Shēnzhèn Wànkē Yángguāng
Yue: Cantonese
- Yale Romanization: Sāmzan Mahkfō Yeùhnggwōng

The Shenzhen Vanke Rays (Chinese: 深圳万科阳光) were a women's ice hockey team that played in the 2017–18 season of the Canadian Women's Hockey League (CWHL). They were based in Shenzhen, Guangdong, China and played at the Shenzhen Dayun Arena. The team was developed along with the Kunlun Red Star WIH as part of the Chinese Ice Hockey Association (CIHA) in an effort to grow interest in ice hockey in China in preparation for the 2022 Winter Olympics in Beijing. Both teams debuted in the 2017–18 CWHL season. The general manager was Shirley Hon, who was named to the position on August 18, 2017.

In 2018, the CWHL contracted the Rays' membership after one season to focus solely on the Kunlun Red Star team in China. Shortly after, Kunlun Red Star was rebranded as the Shenzhen KRS Vanke Rays as the CWHL integrated the two teams.

== History ==
=== Inaugural draft class ===
The following players were selected by the Rays in the 2017 CWHL Draft.

Round	Pick	Nat	Player	Pos.	Previous team
1	7	(Canada)	Cayley Mercer	F	Clarkson Golden Knights
2	14	(Canada)	Elaine Chuli	G	UConn Huskies
3	21	(Canada)	Brooke Webster	F	St. Lawrence Skating Saints
4	28	(Canada)	Hanna Bunton	F	Cornell Big Red
5	35	(United States)	Emily Janiga	F	Buffalo Beauts
6	42	(Canada)	Ashleigh Brykaliuk	F	Minnesota Duluth Bulldogs
7	48	(Canada)	Emma Woods	F	Quinnipiac Bobcats
8	56	(China)	Fang Xin	F	Harbin IHC
9	63	(China)	Zhao Qinan	D	Harbin IHC
10	70	(United States)	Rose Alleva	D	Princeton Tigers
11	77	(Canada)	Lauren Kelly	D	Dartmouth Big Green
12	84	(China)	Kong Minghui	F	Harbin IHC
13	89	(China)	He Xin	F	Harbin IHC
14	92	(China)	Lyu Yue	F	Harbin IHC
15	95	(China)	Wang Bo	D	Harbin IHC
16	98	(China)	Zhang Tianyi	G	
17	101	(China)	Yan Hongxin	D	
18	104	(China)	Xu Jiachao	D	Harbin IHC
19	107	(China)	Gao Han	F	
20	110	(China)	Xiao Jinqiu	D	
