= 2014 IIHF Women's Challenge Cup of Asia =

Tournament details
- Host country: China
- Venue: 1 (in 1 host city)
- Dates: 9–13 March 2014
- Teams: 4

Final positions
- Champions: China (2nd title)
- Runners-up: North Korea
- Third place: South Korea

Tournament statistics
- Games played: 8
- Goals scored: 36 (4.5 per game)
- Attendance: 1,817 (227 per game)

The 2014 IIHF Women's Challenge Cup of Asia was an international women's ice hockey tournament run by the International Ice Hockey Federation. The tournament took place between 9 March and 13 March 2014 in Harbin, China and was the fourth edition held since its formation in 2010 under the IIHF Challenge Cup of Asia series of tournaments. China won the tournament, their first title since 2010, after defeating North Korea in the gold medal game. South Korea beat in the bronze medal game Australia to claim third place.

== Overview ==
The 2014 IIHF Women's Challenge Cup of Asia began on 9 March 2014 in Harbin, China with the games played at Harbin University. China and South Korea both returned after competing in the 2012 tournament. North Korea returned having last competed in the 2010 tournament while Australia made their debut in the IIHF Women's Challenge Cup of Asia. Both Japan and the Chinese junior team did not return, having competed in the 2012 edition.

The tournament was structured around a single round-robin before the teams advanced to the playoffs based on their round-robin positions. China finished the round-robin after winning all three of their games and advanced to the gold medal game against North Korea who finished in second place, losing only to China. South Korea finished the round in third place after managing only one win and advanced to the bronze medal match against Australia who had finished in fourth place after failing to win any of their three games. China defeated North Korea 2-1 in the gold medal game and claimed their second IIHF Women's Challenge Cup of Asia title having previously won in 2010. North Korea picked up the silver medal, improving on their performance from 2010 where they claimed third place. South Korea defeated Australia in the bronze medal game to finish third.

China's Fang Xin finished as the tournament top scorer with seven points and was named the tournaments best forward. Ri Hye Yong of North Korea was named the best goaltender by the IIHF Directorate and China's Liu Zhixin won the best defenceman award. Wang Yuqing of China finished as the tournaments leading goaltender with a save percentage of 96.67.

== Preliminary round ==
=== Standings ===
Team	Pld	W	OTW	OTL	L	GF	GA	GD	Pts	Qualification
China	3	3	0	0	0	13	1	+12	9	Advance to the gold medal game
North Korea	3	2	0	0	1	12	4	+8	6	Advance to the gold medal game
South Korea	3	1	0	0	2	5	13	−8	3	Advance to the bronze medal game
Australia	3	0	0	0	3	1	13	−12	0	Advance to the bronze medal game

Source: IIHF

=== Fixtures ===
All times are local. (CST – UTC+8)

9 March 2014; 15:00	Australia	0 – 4 (0–0, 0–2, 0–2)	North Korea	Harbin University; Attendance: 147

Game reference
8 min	Penalties	6 min
11	Shots	41

9 March 2014; 18:00	China	5 – 0 (1–0, 3–0, 1–0)	South Korea	Harbin University; Attendance: 316

Game reference
10 min	Penalties	8 min
47	Shots	11

10 March 2014; 15:00	South Korea	4 – 1 (1–0, 0–1, 3–0)	Australia	Harbin University; Attendance: 143

Game reference
6 min	Penalties	12 min
30	Shots	31

10 March 2014; 18:00	North Korea	1 – 3 (0–3, 0–0, 1–0)	China	Harbin University; Attendance: 274

Game reference
6 min	Penalties	12 min
15	Shots	37

12 March 2014; 15:00	North Korea	7 – 1 (2–1, 3–0, 2–0)	South Korea	Harbin University; Attendance: 157

Game reference
8 min	Penalties	4 min
44	Shots	25

12 March 2014; 18:00	China	5 – 0 (2–0, 2–0, 1–0)	Australia	Harbin University; Attendance: 237

Game reference
14 min	Penalties	8 min
38	Shots	12

== Playoff round ==
=== Bronze medal game ===
All times are local. (CST – UTC+8)

13 March 2014; 15:00	South Korea	2 – 1 OT (0–0, 0–1, 1–0, 1–0)	Australia	Harbin University; Attendance: 166

Game reference
12 min	Penalties	14 min
34	Shots	35

=== Gold medal game ===
All times are local. (CST – UTC+8)

13 March 2014; 18:00	China	2 – 1 (0–0, 0–0, 2–1)	North Korea	Harbin University; Attendance: 377

Game reference
10 min	Penalties	10 min
29	Shots	32

== Ranking and statistics ==
The final standings of the tournament according to IIHF:

Rk.	Team
1st place, gold medalist(s)	China
2nd place, silver medalist(s)	North Korea
3rd place, bronze medalist(s)	South Korea
4.	Australia

=== Scoring leaders ===
List shows the top ten skaters sorted by points, then goals, assists, and the lower penalties in minutes.

Player	GP	G	A	Pts	+/-	PIM	POS
(China) Fang Xin	4	4	3	7	+6	2	F
(North Korea) O Chol Ok	4	1	4	5	+3	0	F
(North Korea) Ro Sun Bok	4	2	2	4	+4	2	F
(North Korea) Won Chol Sun	4	1	3	4	+3	0	D
(North Korea) Ryu Hyon Mi	4	3	0	3	+3	2	F
(China) Ju Jingwen	4	2	1	3	+3	2	F
(China) Yu Baiwei	4	2	1	3	+8	6	D
(Australia) Shona Green	4	2	0	2	−7	4	F
(South Korea) Ko Hae-in	4	2	0	2	−2	6	F
(China) Kong Minghui	4	2	0	2	+6	8	F
(China) Zhang Mengying	4	2	0	2	+6	4	F

=== Leading goaltenders ===
Only the top goaltenders, based on save percentage, who have played at least 40% of their team's minutes are included in this list.

Player	MIP	SOG	GA	GAA	SVS%	SO
(China) Wang Yuqing	206:03	60	2	0.58	96.67	0
(North Korea) Ri Hye Yong	240:00	102	6	1.50	94.12	1
(Australia) Jodie Walker	184:11	104	8	2.61	92.31	0
(South Korea) Han Do-hee	247:51	157	14	3.39	91.08	0
