= Yu Baiwei =

Chinese ice hockey player (born 1988)

- Born: 17 July 1988 (age 38) Harbin, Heilongjiang, China
- Height: 166 cm (5 ft 5 in)
- Weight: 65 kg (143 lb; 10 st 3 lb)
- Position: Defence
- Shoots: Right
- WCIHL team Former teams: Shenzhen KRS; Kunlun Red Star WIH; Edmonton Chimos; Team China (NSMs)
- National team: China
- Playing career: 2005–present
Medal record
Asian Winter Games
Silver medal – second place	2017 Sapporo	Ice hockey
Bronze medal – third place	2011 Astana–Almaty	Ice hockey
Bronze medal – third place	2007 Changchun	Ice hockey

Yu Baiwei
- Traditional Chinese: 於柏巍
- Simplified Chinese: 于柏巍
Transcriptions
Standard Mandarin
- Hanyu Pinyin: Yú Bǎiwēi

Yu Baiwei (Chinese: 于柏巍, also romanized as Yu Beiwei; born 17 July 1988), also known by the Western name Berry Yu, is a Chinese ice hockey player and captain of the Chinese national team and of Shenzhen KRS in the Chinese Women's Ice Hockey League (WCHIL). A three-time medalist at the Asian Winter Games, she represented China in the women's ice hockey tournament at the 2010 Winter Olympics in Vancouver and in the women's ice hockey tournament at the 2022 Winter Olympics in Beijing.

Yu previously played for Kunlun Red Star WIH and the Shenzhen KRS Vanke Rays of the now-defunct Canadian Women's Hockey League (CWHL), the Edmonton Chimos of the now-defunct Western Women's Hockey League (WWHL), and in the Naisten SM-sarja with Team China. She signed with the Minnesota Whitecaps of the National Women's Hockey League (NWHL) for the 2019–20 season.
