= Shenzhen KRS =

WCIHL ice hockey team based in Shenzhen, China

HC Shenzhen Kunlun Red Star
- City: Shenzhen, Guangdong, China
- League: WCIHL: ZhHL, 2019–2023; CWHL, 2017–2019
- Founded: 2017
- Home arena: Shenzhen Dayun Arena → Mytishchi Arena (2021–2023) → Ice Palace V. M. Bobrova (2020–21)
- Colors: Red, gold, black
- Owner: HC Red Star
- General manager: Zhou Song
- Head coach: Qi Xueting
- Captain: Yu Baiwei

Franchise history
- CWHL
- 2017–2018: Kunlun Red Star WIH
- 2018–2019: Shenzhen KRS Vanke Rays
- ZhHL
- 2019–2022: Shenzhen KRS Vanke Rays
- 2022–2023: Shenzhen Kunlun Red Star
- WCIHL
- 2023–: Shenzhen Kunlun Red Star

Championships
- ZhHL Championships: 2 (2019–20, 2021–22)
- WCIHL Championships: 1 (2023–24)

HC Shenzhen Kunlun Red Star
- Traditional Chinese: 深圳崑崙鴻星冰球俱樂部
- Simplified Chinese: 深圳昆仑鸿星冰球俱乐部
- Literal meaning: Shenzhen Kunlun Red Star Ice Hockey Club
Transcriptions
Standard Mandarin
- Hanyu Pinyin: Shēnzhèn Kūnlún Hóngxīng Bīngqiú Jùlèbù
- Wade–Giles: Shenchen K'unlun Hung'hsing Pingch'iu Chülepu
Yue: Cantonese
- Yale Romanization: Sāmjan Kwānlèuhn Hùhngsīng Bīngkàuh Kēuilohkbouh

HC Shenzhen Kunlun Red Star (Chinese: 深圳昆仑鸿星冰球俱乐部), abbreviated Shenzhen KRS, is an ice hockey team in the Chinese Women's Ice Hockey League (WCIHL). They play in Shenzhen, Guangdong, China at Shenzhen Dayun Arena.

The Shenzhen Kunlun Red Star were founded in 2017 and joined the Canadian Women's Hockey League (CWHL) for the 2017–18 season. During their inaugural season, they were distinguished from other Kunlun Red Star teams with the name Kunlun Red Star Women's Ice Hockey, abbreviated to Kunlun Red Star WIH. The other CWHL team in China, the Vanke Rays, merged into Shenzhen KRS in 2018, prompting the team to rebrand as the Shenzhen Kunlun Red Star Vanke Rays (Chinese: 深圳昆仑鸿星万科阳光; pinyin: Shēnzhèn Kūnlún Hóngxīng Wànkē Yángguāng) or Shenzhen KRS Vanke Rays ahead of the 2018–19 season.

The Shenzhen KRS Vanke Rays (Russian: Шэньчжэнь КРС Ванке Рэйз) joined the Russian Zhenskaya Hockey League (ZhHL) ahead of the 2019–20 season, after the CWHL unexpectedly folded in 2019. In an effort to reinforce the link between the Kunlun Red Star men's and women's programs, the team returned to its original name, Shenzhen KRS (Russian: Шэньчжэнь КРС), in 2022. In 2023, the team ended participation in the ZhHL in order to develop the domestic game within China.

== History ==
=== Canadian Women's Hockey League (CWHL): 2017–2019 ===
The Kunlun Red Star women's ice hockey team was established on 5 June 2017, in an effort to improve the China women's national ice hockey team in preparation for the 2022 Beijing Winter Olympics, in association the Kunlun Red Star men's team that had joined the Kontinental Hockey League the previous year. The team signed two players prior to the official announcement of the team in Finnish goaltender Noora Räty and American forward Kelli Stack. Red Star announced Digit Murphy, formerly of the Boston Blades as head coach. The team also signed Rob Morgan from Yale as associate head coach but soon after became the head coach of the second Chinese team, the Vanke Rays.

With their first round pick in the 2017 CWHL Draft, the Red Star selected Noora Räty. The club proceeded to select Alexandra Carpenter in the second round, while the third round saw the franchise select National Women's Hockey League (NWHL) All-Star Shiann Darkangelo.

On 21 October 2017, the Red Star competed in their first game, facing the Markham Thunder. Kelli Stack and Baiwei Yu both earned assists on the first goal in Kunlun Red Star history, scored by Zoe Hickel. During the regular season, teams that traveled to China played a three-game series against the Red Star in an effort to reduce travel costs.

By season's end, Noora Räty was the CWHL's regular season goaltending champion, leading the league in goals against average. In addition, she tied for the league in shutouts with goaltender Emerance Maschmeyer of Les Canadiennes, with six. Räty also won the CWHL Goaltender of the Year award, the first European-born goaltender to capture the honor, and Kelli Stack led the CWHL in scoring, the first American-born player to win the Angela James Bowl.

Räty was also the starting goaltender for the Red Star in the 2018 Clarkson Cup finals in Toronto. Facing the Markham Thunder, the final went into overtime, where Laura Stacey scored with 2:11 left in the 4-on-4 overtime as Markham prevailed by a 2–1 score for its first Clarkson Cup win. Räty recorded 37 saves in the game while Stack scored the only goal of the game for the Red Star. Head coach Digit Murphy left the team in May and Kunlun Red Star named Bob Deraney, formerly the head coach of the Providence Friars women's ice hockey team, as the new head coach on 12 June 2018.

Prior to the 2018–19 season, the CWHL shut down the other Chinese team, the Vanke Rays. On 3 August 2018, Kunlun Red Star changed its name to Shenzhen KRS Vanke Rays. Rob Morgan, who served as the head coach of the Vanke Rays during its only season was named as the general manager for the consolidated club. Kunlun Red Star brand was continued to be used by a separate hockey team for the Chinese national players as part of the national team's development in preparation for the 2022 Winter Olympics.

In February 2019, the KRS Vanke Rays announced coach Deraney had stepped down and Mike LaZazzera would take over the rest of the season. The team missed qualifying for the final playoff spot via tiebreaker with the Toronto Furies.

Following the season, the CWHL ceased operations citing the financial infeasibility of the league, but that the Chinese partnership had kept the league operating during the previous seasons.

=== Zhenskaya Hockey League (ZhHL): 2019–2023 ===
On 25 July 2019, the team announced they were joining the Zhenskaya Hockey League (ZhHL) for the 2019–20 season. The team hired former North Dakota head coach Brian Idalski, the team's fourth head coach, while retaining veteran players Carpenter, Räty and Rachel Llanes. In their first season in the ZhHL, the Vanke Rays finished second overall in the regular-season table behind HC Agidel Ufa. In the playoff round, the Vanke Rays swept their playoff games against HC Tornado and Agidel to win the ZhHL Cup, becoming the first non-Russian team to win the ZhHL championship. In addition, Carpenter was named the league's scoring champion of 2020.

In response to heightened entry restrictions in Russia amid the COVID-19 pandemic, the team temporarily relocated to Stupino, a Russian town in Moscow Oblast, for the 2020–21 season. While in Stupino, the team's temporary home arena was the Ice Palace V. M. Bobrova (Russian: Ледовый дворец спорта им. В.М. Боброва, romanized: Ledovyy Dvorets Sporta Im. V.m. Bobrova), which they shared with Kapitan Stupino of the Junior Hockey League (MHL).

They relocated to Mytishchi, another town in Moscow Oblast, for the 2021–22 and 2022–23 seasons. Their temporary home was Mytishchi Arena, which they shared with Kunlun Red Star of the Kontinental Hockey League (KHL).

On July 28, 2023, the club announced that they would not play in the ZhHL during the 2023–24 season, "due to the participation of players of the Chinese national team in the domestic championship of the country." The Chinese Ice Hockey Association established a domestic league in 2023 and Shenzhen KRS will be one of six teams participating in the inaugural season. Ivo Mocek will be head coach for the 2023–24 season.

== Season-by-season results ==
This is a complete list of all seasons played by Shenzhen KRS.
Note: Rank = Regular season ranking; GP = Games played, W = Wins (3 points), OTW = Overtime wins (2 points), OTL = Overtime losses (1 point), L = Losses, GF = Goals for, GA = Goals against, Pts = Points, Top scorer: Points (Goals+Assists)

Season	League	Regular season										Postseason results
Season	League	Rank	GP	W	OTW	OTL	L	GF	GA	Pts	Top scorer	Postseason results
2017–18	CWHL	2nd	28	19	2	1	6	92	52	43	(United States) K. Stack 49 (26+23)	Won semifinals, 2–1 (Inferno); Lost finals, 1–2 (Thunder)
2018–19	CWHL	5th	28	13	1	2	13	79	68	28	(United States) A. Carpenter 31 (17+14)	Did not qualify
2019–20	ZhHL	2nd	28	20	2	1	5	109	39	65	(United States) A. Carpenter 53 (21+32)	Won semifinals, 2–0 (Tornado); Won Championship, 3–0 (Agidel)
2020–21	ZhHL	1st	28	24	2	0	2	130	29	76	(United States) A. Carpenter 55 (29+26)	Won semifinals, 2–0 (Biryusa); Lost finals, 1–2 (Agidel)
2021–22	ZhHL	2nd	36	24	4	2	6	96	53	82	(Canada) K. Betinol 21 (10+11)	Won quarterfinals, 2–0 (MSMO 7.62); Won semifinals, 2–1 (Tornado); Won Championship, 3–0 (SKIF)
2022–23	ZhHL	6th	32	10	3	0	19	88	131	36	(Canada) K. Tougas 53 (24+29)	Lost quarterfinals, 1–2 (Dinamo-Neva)
2023–24	WCIHL	1st										Won Championship, 2–0 (Harbin)

== Players and personnel ==
=== 2024–25 roster ===
As of 22 September 2024

No.	Nat	Player	Pos	S/G	Age	Acquired	Birthplace
10	(Canada)	Hunter Barnett	F	L	26	2024	Caledon, Ontario, Canada
–	(China)	Du Sijia	D	L	24	2024	
23	(China)	Fang Xin	F	L	32	2021	Harbin, Heilongjiang, China
46	(Canada)	Danielle Fox	F	L	26	2023	Unionville, Ontario, Canada
3	(China)	Fu Junjie		–		2024	
–	(China)	Hou Qiuguang		–		2024	
28	(Canada)	Ryleigh Houston	F	R	28	2022	Winnipeg, Manitoba, Canada
11	(Canada)	Emma Keenan	D	L	28	2024	Mission Viejo, California, United States
9	(China)	Kong Minghui	F	R	34	2021	Harbin, Heilongjiang, China
69	(China)	Liu Yuchan	G	L	30	2024	
93	(China)	Liu Zhixin (A)	D	L	33	2021	Qiqihar, Heilongjiang, China
26	(Canada)	Maggie MacEachern	D	L	25	2024	Markham, Ontario, Canada
31	(China)	Pi Yunlin	F	R	26	2021	
17	(China)	Qu Yue	F	L	22	2024	
34	(Canada)	Emily Rickwood	D	L	26	2024	Brantford, Ontario, Canada
33	(China)	Song Tiaxin	G	–	21	2023	
–	(China)	Wang Jiaxin	F	L	20	2024	
18	(China)	Wang Siyan	F	L	19	2023	
24	(China)	Wang Yuqing	G	L	32	2021	Harbin, Heilongjiang, China
–	(China)	Wang Yuxin	F	L	22	2024	
94	(China)	Wen Lu	F	L	32	2021	Harbin, Heilongjiang, China
–	(China)	Yang Liying	F	R	28	2024	
2	(China)	Yu Baiwei (C)	D	R	38	2021	Harbin, Heilongjiang, China
67	(China)	Zhang Yuqi	F	L	23	2024	
87	(China)	Zhao Qinan	D	L	29	2021	Harbin, Heilongjiang, China
98	(China)	Zhu Rui	F	L	28	2021	Harbin, Heilongjiang, China

Coaching staff and team personnel

- Head coach: Qi Xueting
- Assistant coach: Alexandr Petrov
- Conditioning coach: Ooi Boon Jiun

=== Front office ===
As of October 2022

- General manager: Nursultan Otorbaev
- Sporting director: Melanie Jue
- President: Ao Meng

=== Team captaincy history ===
- Qi Xueting, 2019–20
- Alex Carpenter, 2020–21
- Yu Baiwei, 2021–22
- Hannah Miller, 2022–23
- Yu Baiwei, 2023–

=== Head coaches ===
- Digit Murphy, 2017–18
- Bob Deraney, June 2018 – February 2019
- Mike LaZazzera, February 2019 – March 2019
- Brian Idalski, 2019–2022
- Scott Spencer, 2022–23
- Ivo Mocek, 2023–24
- Qi Xueting, 2024–

== Awards and honours ==
- Noora Räty, 2018 CWHL Goaltender of the Year
- Kelli Stack, 2018 Angela James Bowl
- Kelli Stack, 2018 CWHL Most Valuable Player
- Alex Carpenter, 2020 ZhHL Top Scorer
