= Chinese Women's Ice Hockey League =

Chinese ice hockey league

- Sport: Ice hockey
- Founded: 2023
- Founder: Chinese Ice Hockey Association
- No. of teams: 7
- Country: China
- Most recent champion: Shenzhen KRS (2023–24)
- Most titles: Shenzhen KRS (1)

- Traditional Chinese: 中國女子冰球職業聯賽
- Simplified Chinese: 中国女子冰球职业联赛
- Literal meaning: Chinese Women's Ice Hockey Professional League
Transcriptions
Standard Mandarin
- Hanyu Pinyin: Zhōngguó Nǚzǐ Bīngqiú Zhíyè Liánsài
- Wade–Giles: Chungkuo Nützu Pingch'iu Chihyeh Liensai
Yue: Cantonese
- Yale Romanization: Jūnggwok Néuihjí Bīngkàuh Jīkyihp Lyùhnchoi

The Chinese Women's Ice Hockey League (Chinese: 中国女子冰球职业联赛; lit. 'Chinese Women's Ice Hockey Professional League'), abbreviated WCIHL, is a professional ice hockey league in China. It was founded by the Chinese Ice Hockey Association (CIHA) as an amateur league in 2021 and was reorganized as a professional league in 2023.

The league should not be confused with the National Women's Ice Hockey Championship (Chinese: 全国女子冰球锦标赛), an annual national competition for provincial teams.

== History ==
In 2021, the CIHA established the first women's ice hockey league held in China, the Chinese Women's Ice Hockey League (Chinese: 中国女子冰球联赛; pinyin: Zhōngguó Nǚzǐ Bīngqiú Liánsài). An amateur league competition for clubs and independent teams, it was founded in an effort to promote and develop youth and women's ice hockey in China, increase the number of players in the national program pool, and to encourage growth of a viable Chinese ice hockey market via the creation and expansion of programs, clubs, and infrastructure; future professionalization of the league was a founding goal.

The league was reorganized into the Chinese Women's Ice Hockey Professional League (Note: The official league name was amended to include "Professional" (职业) in Chinese but was not changed in English language publications and continues to be called the Chinese Women's Ice Hockey League.) ahead of the 2023–24 season, becoming the first professional league organized by the CIHA. With the establishment of a Chinese professional league, Shenzhen KRS left the Russian Zhenskaya Hockey League (ZhHL) to participate in a domestic league for the first time, increasing the number of teams in the WCIHL to seven.

The option for teams to sign up to five international import skaters was introduced following the reorganization of the league. In an effort to "fully train domestic goaltenders," signing foreign goaltenders is not permitted.

=== 2023–24 season ===
The inaugural WCIHL season began with a tournament in Qiqihar, Heilongjiang during 25 November to 2 December. Shenzhen KRS topped the standings after winning all six games of the tournament.

The remaining tournaments of the regular season were held in Harbin, Heilongjiang during 9 to 16 December and in Shenzhen, Guangdong during 30 December to 6 January.

The finals tournament was contested in Beijing during 19 to 26 January. The top-four teams from the regular season – Shenzhen KRS, Qiqihar Landi, Harbin WIHT, and the Beijing Swift – participated in the finals.

A total of eleven import players – from Canada, Finland, Russia, and Slovakia – were active in the 2023–24 WCIHL season. They were contracted to three teams: five played for Shenzhen KRS, three played for the Beijing Swift, and three played for the Sichuan Qin Champion.

== Format ==
The WCIHL season uses a multi-tournament system divided into two parts: a regular season of three tournaments followed by a finals tournament. For each regular season tournament, the seven teams travel to a host city and play a single round-robin of 21 games across a seven or eight day period. The regular season comprises 63 games, with each team playing a total of eighteen matches.

The top four teams from the regular season advance to the finals. There are two stages in the finals: the semifinals and the championship/third place finals, each played as a best-of-three series.

=== Awards ===
A player of the game is selected per team after each game and one player is recognized as best player per tournament. Seasonal awards include best forward, best defenseman, best goaltender, and most valuable player.

== Teams ==
=== 2024–25 season ===
Location in China of teams in the Chinese Women's Ice Hockey League.

Team	Location	Head coach	Captain
Beijing Swift (Note: Beijing Swift Women's Ice Hockey Team (Chinese: 北京雨燕女子冰球队; pinyin: Běijīng Yǔyàn Nǚzǐ Bīngqiú Duì), also known as Beijing Women's Ice Hockey Team (Chinese: 北京市女子冰球队; pinyin: Běijīng-shì Nǚzǐ Bīngqiú Duì; lit. 'Beijing City Women's Ice Hockey Team'))	Beijing	Zhang Jing	Wang Wenzhou
Harbin WHT (Note: Harbin Women's Ice Hockey Team Chinese: 哈尔滨市女子冰球队; pinyin: Hā'ěrbīn-shì Nǚzǐ Bīngqiú Duì, previously also known as Harbin Bailiwei Women's Ice Hockey Team (Chinese: 哈尔滨百利威女子冰球队; pinyin: Hā'ěrbīn Bǎi Lì Wēi Nǚzǐ Bīngqiú Duì; lit. 'Harbin Hundred Benefit Power/Prestige/Threat Women's Ice Hockey Team'))	Harbin	Dang Hong	
Hebei WHT (Note: Hebei Women's Ice Hockey Team (Chinese: 河北省女子冰球队; pinyin: Héběi-shěng Nǚzǐ Bīngqiú Duì; lit. 'Hebei Province Women's Ice Hockey Team'))	Hebei Province	Yu Weihua	Li Qianhua
Qiqihar R&DT (Note: Qiqihar R&DT Women's Ice Hockey Club (Chinese: 齐齐哈尔市兰迪女子冰球俱乐部; pinyin: Qíqíhā'ěr-shì Lán-Dí Nǚzǐ Bīngqiú Jùlèbù; lit. 'Qiqihar City R and DT Ice Hockey Club'))	Qiqihar		
Shanghai WHT (Note: Shanghai Women's Ice Hockey Team (Chinese: 上海市女子冰球队; pinyin: Shànghǎi-shì Nǚzǐ Bīngqiú Duì; lit. 'Shanghai City Women's Ice Hockey Team'); the primary logo on the team's sweaters is that of their parent club, Shanghai Ice and Snow Sports Association (SISSA))	Shanghai		
Sichuan WHT (Note: Sichuan Women's Ice Hockey Team Chinese: 四川省女子冰球队; pinyin: Sìchuān-shěng Nǚzǐ Bīngqiú Duì), also known Sichuan Qin Champion Ice Hockey Team (Chinese: 四川秦冠冰球队; pinyin: Sìchuān Qínguān Bīngqiú Duì))	Jinjiang, Chengdu		
Shenzhen Kunlun Red Star	Shenzhen	Qi Xueting	Yu Baiwei

Official names and transcriptions
