= Ice hockey at the 2007 Asian Winter Games – Men's tournament =

Men at the 2007 Asian Winter Games
- Venue: Fuao Ice Hockey Rink; Jilin Provincial Skating Rink
- Date: 26 January – 3 February 2007
- Competitors: 230 from 11 nations

Medalists
gold medal	Japan
silver medal	Kazakhstan
bronze medal	South Korea

The men's tournament of Ice hockey at the 2007 Asian Winter Games at Changchun, China, was held from 26 January to 3 February 2007.

== Squads ==
China	Hong Kong	Japan	Kazakhstan
Yu Yang; Xie Ming; Chen Lei; Zhang Haiquan; Wang Zhiqiang; Dong Liang; Yin Kai; Lang Bingyu; Liu Kunpeng; Liu Henan; Fu Nan; Zhang Yang; Li Guoyang; Cui Zhinan; Wang Ye; Li Qingming; Du Chao; Wang Dakai; Zhou Yudi; Wang Dahai; Wang Yanfu; Liu Xue; Zhang Weiyang	Scott Yang; Terence Chim; Jeff Leung; Suen Chun Fung; Cheng Siu Lun; Albert Yung; Li Kwan Shing; Julian Ma; Ng Chai Ming; Arthur Tam; Dennis Tsang; Theophilus Wong; Bernard Fung; Bosco Cheung; Kevin Ng; Laputa Poon; Wong Cheung; Leung Sau Chung; Bernard Law; Yeung Ting Kwan; Chan Yiu Fai; Samuel Wong; Bengy Hui	Masahito Haruna; Jun Tonosaki; Kengo Ito; Fumitaka Miyauchi; Yosuke Kon; Sho Sato; Toru Kamino; Masahito Nishiwaki; Go Tanaka; Daisuke Obara; Yoshinori Iimura; Takahito Suzuki; Takeshi Saito; Shinya Yanadori; Hideyuki Osawa; Ryuichi Kawai; Akifumi Okuyama; Tetsuya Saito; Masato Domeki; Mitsuaki Inoue; Naoya Kikuchi; Masahiro Kawamura	Yevgeniy Mazunin; Alexey Korshkov; Andrey Trochshinskiy; Vadim Rifel; Talgat Zhailauov; Alexandr Koreshkov; Oleg Yeremeyev; Yevgeniy Koreshkov; Alexey Gubarev; Oleg Kovalenko; Andrey Ogorodnikov; Lev Krutokhvostov; Anton Komissarov; Maxim Komissarov; Andrey Savenkov; Sergey Miroshnichenko; Sergey Alexandrov; Sergey Ogureshnikov; Yevgeniy Ushkov; Konstantin Kassatkin; Artyom Argokov; Sergey Yakovenko
Kuwait	Macau	Malaysia	North Korea
Mohammad Burabaye; Abdullah Al-Maragi; Mohammad Al-Ajmi; Anwar Al-Attar; Hamad Al-Shayji; Ahmad Al-Ajmi; Shuaib Al-Shuaib; Yousef Al-Kandari; Meshal Al-Ajmi; Yousef Al-Andekali; Mohammad Al-Shatti; Abdulaziz Zalzalah; Fawaz Abdulrahim; Faisal Atallah; Saqer Al-Saberi; Jasem Al-Sarraf; Salem Al-Ajmi	Chu Te Lin; Pong Ka Kit; Cheong Kong Ip; Che Chin Hong; Un Kin Fai; Leong Chon Kong; Tam Weng Leong; Ho Chon Nin; Paulo Pang; Kong Chong Man; Lai Neng; Chan Chi Kit; Che Hou Fai; Chon Ka Miu; Cheong Man Kit; Ao Hon Teng; Pun Lap Fung; Wong Kit Cheng; Wilhelm Hughes; Lei Wan Fong; Lam Hon Kei	Jeremy Chee; Aris Samad Yahaya; Joharris Jehann Beh; Tan Khia Peng; Yeoh Keong Yau; Teh Ton Tee; Jamil David; Ahmad Bazli; Khoo Seng Chee; Adrian Chow; Abdul Hakim Ismail; Tengku Azlly; Ian Daniel Tracy; Chew Jeen Sern; Moi Jia Yung; Haniff Mahmood; Reezman Isa; Azmin Yang Razali	Pak Kun-hyok; Yun Kum-song; Kim Jin-hyok; Kim Hak-chol; Ri Sun-il; Pak Sung-chol; An Yun-chol; Jang Myong-jin; Ri Chol-min; Han Jong-uk; Mun Chol; Ho Kwang-chol; Ri Pong-il; Ri Kum-song; Kim Chang-min; Song Chung-song; Ri Song-chol; Ri Song-chol; Kim Kyong-il; Kim Kwang-ho; Jong Song-il; Ri Se-gwang
South Korea	Thailand	United Arab Emirates	
Park Woo-sang; Yoon Kyung-won; Lee Kwon-joon; Kim Hong-il; Hong Hyun-mok; Suh Sin-il; Choi Jung-sik; Kim Han-sung; Lee Myung-woo; Kim Yoon-hwan; Hwang Byung-wook; Lee Yong-jun; Kim Kyu-hun; Jeon Jin-ho; Kim Ki-sung; Son Ho-seung; Oh Hyon-ho; Kim Kyung-tae; Lee Kwon-jae; Park Sung-min; Eum Hyun-seung	Pongsak Phiewklam; Tewin Chartsuwan; Arthit Thamwongsin; Numchai Pungsiri; Suwichcha Suphong; Yingyos Prongkhompoj; Pasit Jirachai; Teerasak Rattanachot; Samrit Meeraphan; Nattapong Harnnarujchai; Songsak Choodokmai; Anun Kullugin; Prapunpong Theeradetpitak; Chanchit Supadilokluk; Pongkeat Pivekumt; Jantaphong Tengsakul; Chaiyasit Tulwathana; Jason Cotsmire; Somsit Monjai; Chanchieo Supadilokluk; Teranai Harnnarujchai; Vorravith Maklamthong	Khaled Al-Suwaidi; Obaid Al-Muharami; Abdulkareem Awadh; Omar Al-Shamsi; Moftah Al-Dhaheri; Marwan Harmoudi; Ali Al-Sarour; Ali Al-Haddad; Aeyez Al-Muhairbe; Mohamed Al-Zaabi; Faisal Al-Suwaidi; Khaled Al-Qubaisi; Ahmed Al-Dhaheri; Khaled Al-Habsi; Ebraheem Budebs; Nasser Al-Dhaheri; Ali Al-Mazrouei; Ahmad Ali; Juma Al-Dhaheri	

== Results ==
All times are China Standard Time (UTC+08:00)

=== Preliminary round ===
==== Group A ====
Pos	Team	Pld	W	D	L	GF	GA	GD	Pts	Qualification
1	Japan	1	1	0	0	6	1	+5	3	Final round
2	North Korea	1	0	0	1	1	6	−5	0	Classification 5th–8th

Source: Official website

27 January; 10:00	Japan	6–1 (0–0, 5–0, 1–1)	North Korea	Fuao Ice Hockey Rink, Changchun; Attendance: 321

Naoya Kikuchi
Goalies
Ri Song-chol
Referee:
Christer Larking (SWE)

Nishiwaki (Yanadori, Tonosaki) (PP2) – 25:46	1–0
Ta. Saito (Kon, Osawa) (PP) – 32:39	2–0
Suzuki (Iimura, Sato) (PP) – 34:39	3–0
Kamino (Obara, Miyauchi) (PP) – 35:55	4–0
Obara (Kawai, Nishiwaki) – 36:20	5–0
	5–1	46:19 – Kim K.I. (Ri K., Ri P.)
Suzuki (Sato, Iimura) – 47:52	6–1

10 min
Penalties
30 min
37
Shots
7

==== Group B ====
Pos	Team	Pld	W	D	L	GF	GA	GD	Pts	Qualification
1	Kazakhstan	2	2	0	0	90	1	+89	6	Final round
2	United Arab Emirates	2	1	0	1	4	38	−34	3	Classification 5th–8th
3	Thailand	2	0	0	2	1	56	−55	0	Classification 9th–11th

Source: Official website

26 January; 13:30	Thailand	0–4 (0–1, 0–1, 0–2)	United Arab Emirates	Fuao Ice Hockey Rink, Changchun; Attendance: 720

Jason Cotsmire
Goalies
Khaled Al-Suwaidi
Referee:
Keith Fong (HKG)

0–1	18:42 – Al-Shamsi (Al-Haddad)
0–2	33:54 – Al-Sarour (Budebs, F. Al-Suwaidi) (PP)
0–3	41:21 – Al-Zaabi
0–4	59:31 – Al-Zaabi

37 min
Penalties
16 min
16
Shots
21

27 January; 13:30	United Arab Emirates	0–38 (0–14, 0–8, 0–16)	Kazakhstan	Fuao Ice Hockey Rink, Changchun; Attendance: 410

Ahmed Al-Dhaheri
Goalies
Sergey Ogureshnikov
Alexey Gubarev
Referee:
Kim Kang-chol (PRK)

0–1	00:52 – Rifel (Trochshinskiy)
0–2	04:07 – M. Komissarov (A. Komissarov, Miroshnichenko)
0–3	05:13 – Ogorodnikov (Argokov)
0–4	07:43 – Yeremeyev (Krutokhvostov)
0–5	08:51 – Miroshnichenko (A. Komissarov, Alexandrov)
0–6	09:26 – Rifel (Trochshinskiy)
0–7	09:37 – Zhailauov (A. Koreshkov)
0–8	09:48 – Zhailauov
0–9	11:32 – Savenkov (Alexandrov) (SH)
0–10	13:34 – M. Komissarov (A. Koreshkov)
0–11	15:02 – M. Komissarov (Korshkov, Zhailauov)
0–12	18:07 – Rifel (Trochshinskiy, Ogorodnikov) (PP)
0–13	18:40 – A. Koreshkov (Kovalenko)
0–14	18:56 – Krutokhvostov (Yakovenko)
0–15	23:44 – Rifel (Trochshinskiy)
0–16	24:44 – Yeremeyev
0–17	27:40 – Trochshinskiy (Ogorodnikov)
0–18	27:56 – Yeremeyev
0–19	28:34 – Krutokhvostov (Yeremeyev)
0–20	30:39 – Zhailauov (A. Koreshkov)
0–21	33:58 – Kassatkin (Yeremeyev)
0–22	37:40 – Argokov (Ogorodnikov)
0–23	41:48 – Korshkov (Krutokhvostov) (SH)
0–24	42:16 – Yeremeyev (Yakovenko)
0–25	43:08 – Zhailauov
0–26	43:34 – Kassatkin (Alexandrov)
0–27	45:43 – Rifel
0–28	45:50 – Yeremeyev
0–29	49:48 – Mazunin (Ogorodnikov)
0–30	51:40 – M. Komissarov (A. Koreshkov, Zhailauov)
0–31	51:53 – Zhailauov (A. Koreshkov)
0–32	52:26 – Kassatkin
0–33	54:20 – Argokov (Ogorodnikov)
0–34	54:51 – Kassatkin (Yeremeyev)
0–35	56:10 – Kovalenko (A. Koreshkov)
0–36	57:29 – A. Koreshkov (Zhailauov, Kovalenko)
0–37	59:38 – Rifel (Argokov)
0–38	59:56 – Argokov (Ogorodnikov)

4 min
Penalties
8 min
2
Shots
103

29 January; 13:30	Kazakhstan	52–1 (17–0, 20–0, 15–1)	Thailand	Fuao Ice Hockey Rink, Changchun; Attendance: 300

Sergey Ogureshnikov
Alexey Gubarev
Goalies
Pongsak Phiewklam
Jason Cotsmire
Referee:
Kim Kang-chol (PRK)

Trochshinskiy – 01:40	1–0
Kovalenko (Zhailauov) – 02:11	2–0
A. Koreshkov (Zhailauov) – 03:08	3–0
Savenkov (SH) – 05:32	4–0
Ogorodnikov (SH) – 06:31	5–0
M. Komissarov – 07:23	6–0
Yeremeyev (Kassatkin) – 07:50	7–0
M. Komissarov (Miroshnichenko) – 09:23	8–0
Yeremeyev (PP) – 13:05	9–0
Yeremeyev (Krutokhvostov) – 13:54	10–0
Miroshnichenko (M. Komissarov) – 14:51	11–0
Trochshinskiy (Mazunin) – 15:22	12–0
Rifel (Ogorodnikov) – 16:33	13–0
Kovalenko – 16:49	14–0
Zhailauov (A. Koreshkov) – 18:05	15–0
Yeremeyev (Krutokhvostov) – 18:33	16–0
Yeremeyev (Yakovenko) – 19:16	17–0
Alexandrov – 21:00	18–0
Zhailauov – 21:38	19–0
A. Koreshkov – 21:57	20–0
Argokov – 22:26	21–0
Rifel – 23:05	22–0
Krutokhvostov – 23:42	23–0
Kassatkin (Korshkov) – 24:05	24–0
A. Komissarov (Savenkov) – 24:53	25–0
Miroshnichenko – 25:31	26–0
Mazunin – 26:48	27–0
Miroshnichenko – 27:06	28–0
Yeremeyev – 27:34	29–0
A. Koreshkov – 31:09	30–0
Trochshinskiy – 31:56	31–0
Yeremeyev (Krutokhvostov) – 33:56	32–0
Yakovenko – 34:37	33–0
Alexandrov – 36:01	34–0
Argokov – 37:42	35–0
Argokov – 38:46	36–0
Korshkov – 39:49	37–0
Kassatkin – 41:18	38–0
Zhailauov (PP) – 41:44	39–0
Mazunin – 43:08	40–0
Rifel – 43:30	41–0
Yakovenko – 43:49	42–0
Rifel – 44:00	43–0
A. Koreshkov – 44:30	44–0
A. Komissarov – 45:48	45–0
	45–1	47:15 – Thamwongsin
Kassatkin – 50:23	46–1
Trochshinskiy – 52:31	47–1
Argokov – 52:47	48–1
Kassatkin – 54:10	49–1
Savenkov – 56:37	50–1
Kassatkin (Krutokhvostov) – 58:51	51–1
A. Koreshkov – 59:18	52–1

6 min
Penalties
4 min
91
Shots
7

==== Group C ====
Pos	Team	Pld	W	D	L	GF	GA	GD	Pts	Qualification
1	China	2	2	0	0	37	1	+36	6	Final round
2	Kuwait	2	1	0	1	16	13	+3	3	Classification 5th–8th
3	Macau	2	0	0	2	2	41	−39	0	Classification 9th–11th

Source: Official website

26 January; 17:00	Kuwait	15–2 (3–0, 7–0, 5–2)	Macau	Fuao Ice Hockey Rink, Changchun; Attendance: 700

Jasem Al-Sarraf
Abdulaziz Zalzalah
Goalies
Chu Te Lin
Referee:
Hyun Ho-han (KOR)

Al-Shayji (A. Al-Ajmi) – 03:42	1–0
A. Al-Ajmi (SH) – 10:08	2–0
Atallah (Al-Kandari) – 14:28	3–0
S. Al-Ajmi (Al-Kandari) – 23:51	4–0
Al-Maragi – 26:29	5–0
Mo. Al-Ajmi (Al-Maragi) (PP) – 29:18	6–0
Al-Saberi (S. Al-Ajmi) – 32:51	7–0
Mo. Al-Ajmi (A. Al-Ajmi) – 33:38	8–0
Me. Al-Ajmi (Al-Saberi) – 36:24	9–0
Al-Kandari – 37:10	10–0
Al-Kandari (Al-Saberi, Burabaye) – 43:54	11–0
A. Al-Ajmi (Al-Maragi, Mo. Al-Ajmi) (PP) – 48:24	12–0
Al-Kandari (Me. Al-Ajmi) – 54:21	13–0
Mo. Al-Ajmi (Al-Shayji, Burabaye) – 56:22	14–0
	14–1	57:18 – Chon (Che H.F., Leong)
Al-Maragi (Mo. Al-Ajmi) – 58:42	15–1
	15–2	59:27 – Che H.F.

32 min
Penalties
6 min
44
Shots
8

27 January; 17:00	Macau	0–26 (0–11, 0–8, 0–7)	China	Fuao Ice Hockey Rink, Changchun; Attendance: 543

Chu Te Lin
Goalies
Liu Xue
Xie Ming
Referee:
Sergey Khalikov (KAZ)

0–1	01:03 – Wang Dak.
0–2	01:12 – Wang Z. (Lang)
0–3	01:28 – Wang Z. (Dong)
0–4	04:51 – Wang Z. (Dong)
0–5	06:37 – Cui (Liu K.)
0–6	07:13 – Li G. (Zhang Y.)
0–7	08:36 – Cui
0–8	10:47 – Lang (Dong)
0–9	11:55 – Fu
0–10	15:12 – Cui (Fu)
0–11	15:28 – Li G. (Zhang W.)
0–12	21:14 – Du
0–13	22:32 – Fu
0–14	24:51 – Yin
0–15	30:10 – Cui (Wang Z.)
0–16	31:49 – Wang Dah. (Liu K.)
0–17	32:26 – Wang Y. (Du, Li Q.)
0–18	34:11 – Fu (Chen)
0–19	35:47 – Li Q. (Du)
0–20	42:42 – Dong (Wang Z.)
0–21	44:26 – Zhang Y. (Li G.)
0–22	50:21 – Wang Z. (Dong)
0–23	50:49 – Dong
0–24	52:43 – Wang Dak.
0–25	56:57 – Zhou
0–26	59:47 – Zhou (Du) (SH)

0 min
Penalties
4 min
0
Shots
73

29 January; 17:00	China	11–1 (6–0, 4–0, 1–1)	Kuwait	Fuao Ice Hockey Rink, Changchun; Attendance: 350

Liu Xue
Xie Ming
Goalies
Jasem Al-Sarraf
Referee:
Hyun Ho-han (KOR)

Wang Y. – 00:59	1–0
Li G. (Zhang Y.) – 07:09	2–0
Fu (Liu H.) – 08:56	3–0
Liu H. (SH) – 12:10	4–0
Cui (Liu H.) – 14:50	5–0
Du (Wang Y., Wang Dak.) – 19:59	6–0
Li G. (Zhang W., Zhang Y.) – 20:27	7–0
Wang Dak. (Wang Y.) – 20:43	8–0
Lang (Wang Z.) – 30:20	9–0
Li Q. (SH) – 39:30	10–0
Wang Y. (SH) – 55:47	11–0
	11–1	57:24 – Me. Al-Ajmi

8 min
Penalties
4 min
32
Shots
4

==== Group D ====
Pos	Team	Pld	W	D	L	GF	GA	GD	Pts	Qualification
1	South Korea	2	2	0	0	25	1	+24	6	Final round
2	Malaysia	2	1	0	1	8	17	−9	3	Classification 5th–8th
3	Hong Kong	2	0	0	2	3	18	−15	0	Classification 9th–11th

Source: Official website

26 January; 20:30	Malaysia	7–3 (3–3, 1–0, 3–0)	Hong Kong	Fuao Ice Hockey Rink, Changchun; Attendance: 710

Abdul Hakim Ismail
Goalies
Samuel Wong
Referee:
Sergey Khalikov (KAZ)

Razali (Chee) – 02:43	1–0
Teh (Khoo) – 11:05	2–0
	2–1	13:59 – Cheung (PP)
Tan (Teh) (PP) – 15:39	3–1
	3–2	18:04 – Cheung (T. Wong) (PP)
	3–3	18:25 – Ng C. (Suen)
Khoo – 37:10	4–3
David – 42:35	5–3
Chee – 49:17	6–3
Tan (Teh) – 49:49	7–3

18 min
Penalties
14 min
36
Shots
21

27 January; 20:30	South Korea	11–0 (3–0, 4–0, 4–0)	Hong Kong	Fuao Ice Hockey Rink, Changchun; Attendance: 558

Son Ho-seung
Eum Hyun-seung
Goalies
Scott Yang
Bengy Hui
Referee:
Wang Zhanyong (CHN)

Park W. (Park S., Kim K.H.) – 01:28	1–0
Jeon (Kim K.T., Suh) – 02:24	2–0
Jeon (Suh, Lee K.Jo.) – 05:48	3–0
Kim K.S. (Kim K.H., Park W.) – 25:59	4–0
Jeon (Kim K.T., Lee K.Jo.) – 26:58	5–0
Suh (Lee Y.) (PP) – 28:02	6–0
Oh (Kim K.T., Suh) – 38:04	7–0
Kim K.S. (Park W., Kim K.H.) – 41:17	8–0
Kim K.S. (Lee K.Ja., Choi) – 43:34	9–0
Lee K.Jo. (Kim K.T., Oh) (PP) – 52:07	10–0
Hwang (Choi) – 52:52	11–0

4 min
Penalties
4 min
34
Shots
2

29 January; 20:30	Malaysia	1–14 (0–3, 0–4, 1–7)	South Korea	Fuao Ice Hockey Rink, Changchun; Attendance: 340

Tengku Azlly
Abdul Hakim Ismail
Goalies
Son Ho-seung
Eum Hyun-seung
Referee:
Keith Fong (HKG)

	0–1	00:49 – Kim H.I. (Kim K.T.)
	0–2	01:23 – Park W. (Kim K.S., Park S.)
	0–3	02:17 – Lee K.Ja. (Choi, Lee M.)
	0–4	21:31 – Kim K.H. (Park W., Park S.)
	0–5	30:23 – Choi (Lee Y.)
	0–6	31:23 – Kim H.I. (Kim K.T.) (SH)
	0–7	33:56 – Jeon (Lee K.Jo.)
	0–8	42:18 – Lee K.Ja. (Lee Y., Choi)
	0–9	44:10 – Park W. (Kim K.H., Kim K.S.)
	0–10	47:13 – Kim K.S. (Kim K.H., Lee M.)
	0–11	50:19 – Lee K.Jo. (Kim H.I., Suh) (PP)
	0–12	51:10 – Lee M. (Lee Y., Hwang)
	0–13	51:43 – Lee M. (Lee K.Ja., Hwang)
	0–14	55:36 – Kim K.T. (Lee K.Jo., Kim H.I.)
Razali (Tan) – 58:39	1–14

10 min
Penalties
22 min
4
Shots
39

=== Classification 9th–11th ===
Classification 9th–11th
30 January
Macau	0
Thailand	6

Classification 9th–10th
2 February
Thailand	4
Hong Kong	3

==== Semifinals ====
30 January; 13:30	Macau	0–6 (0–2, 0–1, 0–3)	Thailand	Fuao Ice Hockey Rink, Changchun; Attendance: 320

Chu Te Lin
Goalies
Pongsak Phiewklam
Jason Cotsmire
Referee:
Keith Fong (HKG)

0–1	09:14 – N. Harnnarujchai (Pungsiri, Monjai)
0–2	12:02 – Kullugin (Chartsuwan)
0–3	38:38 – Jirachai (Prongkhompoj)
0–4	47:21 – Monjai (N. Harnnarujchai, Prongkhompoj) (PP2)
0–5	57:26 – Jirachai (Rattanachot)
0–6	59:20 – Chartsuwan (Pungsiri)

18 min
Penalties
28 min
5
Shots
50

==== Classification 9th–10th ====
2 February; 13:30	Thailand	4–3 (0–0, 3–0, 1–3)	Hong Kong	Fuao Ice Hockey Rink, Changchun; Attendance: 350

Jason Cotsmire
Goalies
Scott Yang
Samuel Wong
Referee:
Hyun Ho-han (KOR)

Choodokmai (N. Harnnarujchai, T. Harnnarujchai) – 25:06	1–0
Thamwongsin (Rattanachot) – 27:16	2–0
Chartsuwan (Rattanachot, Meeraphan) – 30:37	3–0
Thamwongsin – 50:39	4–0
	4–1	51:25 – Tam
	4–2	53:57 – Cheung (Yung)
	4–3	55:58 – Ng C. (Fung, Poon) (PP)

22 min
Penalties
32 min
37
Shots
16

=== Classification 5th–8th ===
Classification 5th–8th
30 January
North Korea	15
Malaysia	0
30 January
Kuwait	2
United Arab Emirates	6

Classification 5th–6th
2 February
North Korea	9
United Arab Emirates	2
Classification 7th–8th
2 February
Malaysia	2
Kuwait	10

==== Semifinals ====
30 January; 17:00	North Korea	15–0 (8–0, 3–0, 4–0)	Malaysia	Fuao Ice Hockey Rink, Changchun; Attendance: 350

Ri Song-chol
Pak Kun-hyok
Goalies
Abdul Hakim Ismail
Tengku Azlly
Referee:
Christer Larking (SWE)

Song (Ri S.I., Kim H.) – 02:09	1–0
Song (SH) – 03:26	2–0
Song (Ri S.I., Ri K.) – 07:44	3–0
Kim K.I. (Mun) – 08:31	4–0
Jang (Ri S.G.) – 10:20	5–0
Ho (Ri K., Ri S.I.) (PP) – 16:29	6–0
Mun (Kim K.I., Ri P.) – 16:55	7–0
Ri P. (Kim K.H., Mun) – 18:09	8–0
Kim K.H. (Kim K.I., Ri P.) – 21:15	9–0
Pak S. (Jang, Ri S.G.) – 21:46	10–0
Kim K.H. (Han) – 34:32	11–0
Kim K.I. (Han, Mun) – 54:35	12–0
Kim C. – 55:27	13–0
Kim K.H. – 55:58	14–0
Ri C. (Jang) – 57:51	15–0

8 min
Penalties
6 min
48
Shots
7

30 January; 20:30	Kuwait	2–6 (0–0, 1–2, 1–4)	United Arab Emirates	Fuao Ice Hockey Rink, Changchun; Attendance: 310

Jasem Al-Sarraf
Goalies
Khaled Al-Suwaidi
Referee:
Wang Zhanyong (CHN)

	0–1	21:30 – Al-Shamsi (Al-Mazrouei)
	0–2	30:32 – J. Al-Dhaheri (PS)
A. Al-Ajmi – 39:27	1–2
	1–3	41:22 – J. Al-Dhaheri (F. Al-Suwaidi) (PP)
	1–4	42:53 – Al-Shamsi (J. Al-Dhaheri) (PP)
	1–5	44:41 – J. Al-Dhaheri (F. Al-Suwaidi)
	1–6	54:19 – Al-Sarour (Al-Muhairbe)
A. Al-Ajmi – 57:54	2–6

26 min
Penalties
16 min
9
Shots
38

==== Classification 7th–8th ====
2 February; 17:00	Malaysia	2–10 (1–2, 1–5, 0–3)	Kuwait	Fuao Ice Hockey Rink, Changchun; Attendance: 350

Abdul Hakim Ismail
Tengku Azlly
Goalies
Jasem Al-Sarraf
Referee:
Wang Zhanyong (CHN)

Beh (Razali) – 01:02	1–0
	1–1	08:45 – Al-Kandari (Mo. Al-Ajmi) (PP)
	1–2	12:31 – Mo. Al-Ajmi
	1–3	24:33 – Mo. Al-Ajmi
	1–4	24:52 – Me. Al-Ajmi (A. Al-Ajmi)
	1–5	30:48 – Mo. Al-Ajmi (Abdulrahim)
Chee (Khoo, Bazli) (PP) – 36:24	2–5
	2–6	37:57 – Al-Saberi (Al-Maragi)
	2–7	38:22 – Me. Al-Ajmi (A. Al-Ajmi)
	2–8	40:24 – Mo. Al-Ajmi (A. Al-Ajmi)
	2–9	49:44 – Mo. Al-Ajmi
	2–10	55:49 – S. Al-Ajmi (PP)

45 min
Penalties
49 min
25
Shots
34

==== Classification 5th–6th ====
2 February; 20:30	United Arab Emirates	2–9 (0–3, 0–4, 2–2)	North Korea	Fuao Ice Hockey Rink, Changchun; Attendance: 350

Khaled Al-Suwaidi
Ahmed Al-Dhaheri
Goalies
Ri Song-chol
Pak Kun-hyok
Referee:
Keith Fong (HKG)

	0–1	07:57 – Kim K.I.
	0–2	12:12 – Song (Kim C.)
	0–3	16:00 – Ri S.I. (Ho)
	0–4	25:06 – Kim K.H. (Ri P.)
	0–5	32:58 – Ri S.G. (Jang, Kim J.)
	0–6	34:10 – Kim J. (Jong)
	0–7	37:44 – An (Ri S.I.)
F. Al-Suwaidi (Budebs, Al-Shamsi) (PP) – 46:36	1–7
F. Al-Suwaidi – 50:12	2–7
	2–8	54:19 – Ri C. (Ri S.I.)
	2–9	59:41 – Kim K.H. (Ri C.)

4 min
Penalties
8 min
10
Shots
41

=== Final round ===
Pos	Team	Pld	W	D	L	GF	GA	GD	Pts
1	Japan	3	3	0	0	9	3	+6	9
2	Kazakhstan	3	2	0	1	27	5	+22	6
3	South Korea	3	1	0	2	6	14	−8	3
4	China	3	0	0	3	5	25	−20	0

Source: Official website

31 January; 19:00	Japan	3–0 (1–0, 0–0, 2–0)	South Korea	Fuao Ice Hockey Rink, Changchun; Attendance: 720

Masahito Haruna
Goalies
Son Ho-seung
Referee:
Wang Zhanyong (CHN)

Iimura (Sato, Miyauchi) – 14:16	1–0
Suzuki (Osawa) (PP) – 54:34	2–0
Tanaka (PP) – 59:09	3–0

65 min
Penalties
75 min
22
Shots
15

31 January; 22:30	China	1–17 (0–6, 0–6, 1–5)	Kazakhstan	Fuao Ice Hockey Rink, Changchun; Attendance: 750

Liu Xue
Xie Ming
Goalies
Sergey Ogureshnikov
Referee:
Hyun Ho-han (KOR)

	0–1	00:29 – Trochshinskiy (Rifel, Ogorodnikov)
	0–2	03:48 – Krutokhvostov (Yeremeyev, Korshkov) (PP)
	0–3	06:21 – Krutokhvostov (Kassatkin)
	0–4	10:26 – Yeremeyev (Kassatkin, Yakovenko)
	0–5	18:33 – M. Komissarov (A. Komissarov)
	0–6	18:58 – Rifel (Trochshinskiy)
	0–7	28:37 – Kovalenko (Zhailauov, A. Koreshkov) (PP)
	0–8	30:33 – Savenkov
	0–9	32:11 – Ushkov (Rifel, Y. Koreshkov)
	0–10	34:01 – Krutokhvostov (Yeremeyev)
	0–11	36:37 – A. Koreshkov (Zhailauov, Kovalenko)
	0–12	39:56 – Ogorodnikov (SH)
Du (PP2) – 41:05	1–12
	1–13	44:30 – A. Koreshkov (Y. Koreshkov)
	1–14	49:35 – A. Koreshkov (Y. Koreshkov)
	1–15	52:31 – Kassatkin (Krutokhvostov, Yeremeyev) (PP2)
	1–16	54:06 – Alexandrov (A. Komissarov)
	1–17	59:13 – A. Koreshkov (Y. Koreshkov)

14 min
Penalties
12 min
11
Shots
54

1 February; 19:00	Japan	3–2 (2–1, 0–1, 1–0)	Kazakhstan	Fuao Ice Hockey Rink, Changchun; Attendance: 320

Masahito Haruna
Goalies
Sergey Ogureshnikov
Referee:
Christer Larking (SWE)

	0–1	05:07 – Zhailauov (A. Koreshkov)
Nishiwaki (Tonosaki, Osawa) (PP2) – 08:40	1–1
Sato (Suzuki, Kawai) (PP) – 09:37	2–1
	2–2	28:36 – Ogorodnikov (Rifel) (PP)
Sato (Osawa, Te. Saito) (PP) – 51:32	3–2

22 min
Penalties
16 min
20
Shots
39

1 February; 21:00	China	3–5 (2–0, 0–3, 1–2)	South Korea	Jilin Provincial Skating Rink, Changchun; Attendance: 2,800

Liu Xue
Goalies
Son Ho-seung
Referee:
Sergey Khalikov (KAZ)

Li G. (Zhou) – 05:48	1–0
Wang Y. – 17:06	2–0
	2–1	23:46 – Kim K.S.
	2–2	25:29 – Jeon (Kim K.T.)
	2–3	34:14 – Lee K.Ja.
	2–4	40:48 – Kim K.H. (SH)
Liu H. – 56:06	3–4
	3–5	58:06 – Jeon (SH)

12 min
Penalties
18 min
25
Shots
23

3 February; 15:30	Japan	3–1 (2–1, 1–0, 0–0)	China	Fuao Ice Hockey Rink, Changchun; Attendance: 650

Kikuchi Naoya
Inoue Mitsuaki
Goalies
Yu Yang
Referee:
Christer Larking (SWE)

	0–1	08:32 – Wang Z. (Yin, Zhou) (SH)
Iimura (Suzuki, Kawai) (PP) – 12:28	1–1
Kawamura (Kon, Te. Saito) (PP) – 17:03	2–1
Nishiwaki (Obara, Suzuki) – 29:18	3–1

20 min
Penalties
41 min
28
Shots
21

3 February; 19:00	Kazakhstan	8–1 (2–0, 3–0, 3–1)	South Korea	Fuao Ice Hockey Rink, Changchun; Attendance: 650

Sergey Ogureshnikov
Alexey Gubarev
Goalies
Son Ho-seung
Eum Hyun-seung
Referee:
Christer Larking (SWE)

A. Komissarov (Savenkov) (PP) – 09:48	1–0
Alexandrov (A. Komissarov, Savenkov) – 14:10	2–0
Argokov (A. Koreshkov, Zhailauov) – 22:07	3–0
Yakovenko (A. Koreshkov) – 27:56	4–0
Krutokhvostov (Kassatkin, Yeremeyev) – 33:11	5–0
	5–1	46:34 – Park W. (Kim K.S., Oh)
A. Koreshkov (Kassatkin, Savenkov) – 48:13	6–1
Zhailauov (Kovalenko, A. Koreshkov) (PP) – 51:51	7–1
Alexandrov (Miroshnichenko, Savenkov) – 52:14	8–1

6 min
Penalties
8 min
39
Shots
20

== Final standing ==
Rank	Team	Pld	W	D	L
1st place, gold medalist(s)	Japan	4	4	0	0
2nd place, silver medalist(s)	Kazakhstan	5	4	0	1
3rd place, bronze medalist(s)	South Korea	5	3	0	2
4	China	5	2	0	3
5	North Korea	3	2	0	1
6	United Arab Emirates	4	2	0	2
7	Kuwait	4	2	0	2
8	Malaysia	4	1	0	3
9	Thailand	4	2	0	2
10	Hong Kong	3	0	0	3
11	Macau	3	0	0	3
