= Mikhail Panshin =

Kazakh-Russian ice hockey player

- Born: May 2, 1983 (age 43) Cherepovets, Soviet Union
- Height: 6 ft 0 in (183 cm)
- Weight: 192 lb (87 kg; 13 st 10 lb)
- Position: Forward
- Shot: Right
- Played for: SKA St. Petersburg; Neftyanik Almetievsk; HC Belgorod; Vityaz Podolsk; Amur Khabarovsk; Molot-Prikamie Perm; Khimik Voskresensk; Beibarys Atyrau; Yertis Pavlodar; Barys Astana
- National team: Kazakhstan
- NHL draft: Undrafted
- Playing career: 2000–2017

Mikhail Viktorovich Panshin (Russian: Михаил Викторович Паньшин; born May 2, 1983) is a Kazakhstani-Russian professional ice hockey forward who currently plays for Barys Astana of the Kontinental Hockey League (KHL).

== International ==
Panshin was named to the Kazakhstan men's national ice hockey team for competition at the 2014 IIHF World Championship.

== Career statistics ==
			Regular season					Playoffs
Season	Team	League	GP	G	A	Pts	PIM	GP	G	A	Pts	PIM
1998–99	Severstal Cherepovets-2	Russia2	2	0	1	1	2	—	—	—	—	—
1998–99	Severstal Cherepovets-3	Russia3	8	1	3	4	2	—	—	—	—	—
1999–00	Severstal Cherepovets-2	Russia3	22	16	10	26	14	—	—	—	—	—
2000–01	Severstal Cherepovets-2	Russia3	40	14	15	29	14	—	—	—	—	—
2000–01	SKA Saint Petersburg	Russia	5	0	1	1	2	—	—	—	—	—
2001–02	Severstal Cherepovets-2	Russia3	26	12	11	23	8	—	—	—	—	—
2001–02	SKA Saint Petersburg	Russia	5	0	0	0	2	—	—	—	—	—
2001–02	SKA Saint Petersburg-2	Russia3	2	3	3	6	0	—	—	—	—	—
2002–03	Neftyanik Almetyevsk	Russia2	46	8	8	16	38	12	2	0	2	2
2002–03	Neftyanik Almetyevsk-2	Russia3	2	3	1	4	0	—	—	—	—	—
2003–04	Neftyanik Almetyevsk	Russia2	25	7	4	11	37	—	—	—	—	—
2003–04	Neftyanik Almetyevsk-2	Russia3	17	14	3	17	4	—	—	—	—	—
2004–05	HC Belgorod	Russia2	34	8	8	16	38	—	—	—	—	—
2005–06	Vityaz Chekhov	Russia	6	0	0	0	4	—	—	—	—	—
2005–06	Vityaz Chekhov-2	Russia3	16	7	7	14	22	—	—	—	—	—
2005–06	Amur Khabarovsk	Russia2	5	0	0	0	4	—	—	—	—	—
2005–06	Amur Khabarovsk-2	Russia3	5	4	3	7	2	—	—	—	—	—
2005–06	HC Lipetsk	Russia2	3	1	0	1	6	3	0	1	1	2
2006–07	Molot-Prikamye Perm	Russia2	55	13	13	26	40	9	0	1	1	18
2007–08	Molot-Prikamye Perm	Russia2	51	13	23	36	28	5	1	1	2	8
2008–09	Khimik Voskresensk	KHL	4	0	1	1	2	—	—	—	—	—
2008–09	Khimik Voskresensk-2	Russia3	9	2	2	4	10	—	—	—	—	—
2008–09	HK Dmitrov	Russia2	8	1	1	2	16	—	—	—	—	—
2008–09	HK Dmitrov-2	Russia4	2	1	0	1	2	—	—	—	—	—
2008–09	Molot-Prikamye Perm	Russia2	25	6	9	15	18	9	3	1	4	2
2009–10	Beibarys Atyrau	Kazakhstan	53	29	33	62	28	10	2	5	7	29
2010–11	Beibarys Atyrau	Kazakhstan	53	26	27	53	22	13	4	6	10	6
2011–12	Beibarys Atyrau	Kazakhstan	53	27	28	55	18	13	10	4	14	6
2012–13	Yertis Pavlodar	Kazakhstan	50	23	26	49	43	14	12	8	20	2
2013–14	Barys Astana	KHL	17	3	2	5	4	1	0	0	0	0
2013–14	Nomad Astana	Kazakhstan	10	1	5	6	6	—	—	—	—	—
2014–15	Saryarka Karagandy	VHL	43	12	15	27	68	13	2	2	4	10
2015–16	Yertis Pavlodar	Kazakhstan	17	8	6	14	6	—	—	—	—	—
2015–16	Barys Astana	KHL	30	0	2	2	46	—	—	—	—	—
2015–16	Nomad Astana	Kazakhstan	3	0	1	1	0	5	1	2	3	2
2016–17	Beibarys Atyrau	Kazakhstan	29	9	11	20	12	3	0	0	0	0
KHL totals			51	3	5	8	52	1	0	0	0	0
Russia totals			16	0	1	1	8	—	—	—	—	—
Russia2 totals			254	57	67	124	227	38	6	4	10	32
Russia3 totals			147	76	58	134	76	—	—	—	—	—
Kazakhstan totals			268	123	137	260	135	58	29	25	54	45
