= Andrei Troschinsky =

Kazakhstani ice hockey player

- Born: February 14, 1978 Ust-Kamenogorsk, Kazakh SSR, Soviet Union
- Died: December 21, 2015 (aged 37) Pavlodar, Kazakhstan
- Height: 6 ft 3 in (191 cm)
- Weight: 185 lb (84 kg; 13 st 3 lb)
- Position: Center
- Shot: Left
- Played for: GKS Katowice; Worcester IceCats; Metallurg Magnitogorsk; HK Jesenice; Gazovik Tyumen; Saryarka Karagandy; Barys Astana; Yertis Pavlodar; Kazzinc-Torpedo; Arlan Kokshetau
- National team: Kazakhstan
- NHL draft: 170th overall, 1998; St. Louis Blues
- Playing career: 1994–2015

Andrei Borisovich Troschinsky (Russian: Андрей Борисович Трощи́нский; February 14, 1978 – December 21, 2015) was a Kazakh professional ice hockey player, who played for Kazakhstan National Hockey Team at the 1999 Asian Winter Games. Troschinsky was a graduate of the Ust-Kamenogorsk ice hockey school. He was drafted 170th overall in the sixth round of the 1998 NHL entry draft by St. Louis Blues, but never signed a contract or participated in a game with them. He was the younger brother of Alexei Troschinsky.

== Death ==
In the morning of 21 December 2015, Troschinsky felt unwell upon waking up and called an ambulance; while in the vehicle he had a heart attack and died.

== Career statistics ==
=== Regular season and playoffs ===
			Regular season					Playoffs
Season	Team	League	GP	G	A	Pts	PIM	GP	G	A	Pts	PIM
1993–94	Torpedo–2 Ust–Kamenogorsk	RUS.3
1994–95	Dynamo–2 Moscow	RUS.2	21	1	1	2	4	—	—	—	—	—
1995–96	Dynamo–2 Moscow	RUS.2	23	2	5	7	2	—	—	—	—	—
1996–97	Torpedo Ust–Kamenogorsk	RUS.2	26	8	10	18	24	—	—	—	—	—
1996–97	Torpedo–2 Ust–Kamenogorsk	RUS.3	28	13	12	25	28	—	—	—	—	—
1997–98	Torpedo Ust–Kamenogorsk	RUS.2	29	6	9	15	20	—	—	—	—	—
1997–98	Torpedo–2 Ust–Kamenogorsk	RUS.3	8	8	4	12	14	—	—	—	—	—
1998–99	Torpedo Ust–Kamenogorsk	RUS.2	30	8	15	23	42	—	—	—	—	—
1998–99	Torpedo–2 Ust–Kamenogorsk	RUS.3	4	4	4	8	6	—	—	—	—	—
1999–2000	Torpedo Ust–Kamenogorsk	RUS.3	41	20	46	66	32	—	—	—	—	—
2000–01	Worcester IceCats	AHL	78	17	28	45	32	11	2	2	4	2
2001–02	Worcester IceCats	AHL	70	13	10	23	32	2	0	0	0	0
2002–03	Metallurg Magnitogorsk	RSL	1	0	0	0	0	—	—	—	—	—
2002–03	Metallurg–2 Magnitogorsk	RUS.3	6	2	4	6	0	—	—	—	—	—
2002–03	Kazzinc–Torpedo	RUS.2	26	4	6	10	22	—	—	—	—	—
2003–04	Kazzinc–Torpedo	KAZ	22	12	25	37	4	—	—	—	—	—
2003–04	Kazzinc–Torpedo	RUS.2	51	11	23	34	30	—	—	—	—	—
2004–05	Kazzinc–Torpedo	KAZ	22	6	9	15	8	—	—	—	—	—
2004–05	Kazzinc–Torpedo	RUS.2	43	11	22	33	14	—	—	—	—	—
2005–06	Kazzinc–Torpedo	KAZ	18	4	10	14	18	—	—	—	—	—
2005–06	Kazzinc–Torpedo	RUS.2	38	5	9	14	46	—	—	—	—	—
2005–06	Torpedo–2 Ust–Kamenogorsk	RUS.3	1	0	0	0	0	—	—	—	—	—
2006–07	Kazzinc–Torpedo	KAZ	22	6	12	18	26	—	—	—	—	—
2006–07	Kazzinc–Torpedo	RUS.2	56	17	37	54	72	—	—	—	—	—
2007–08	Kazzinc–Torpedo	RUS.2	50	12	16	28	62	5	1	4	5	8
2008–09	Barys Astana	KHL	2	0	0	0	6	—	—	—	—	—
2008–09	Kazzinc–Torpedo	RUS.2	37	7	19	26	30	3	2	1	3	6
2009–10	HK Jesenice	AUT	11	3	3	6	12	—	—	—	—	—
2009–10	Gazovik Tyumen	RUS.2	25	5	5	10	34	7	1	1	2	4
2010–11	Saryarka Karagandy	KAZ	25	4	10	14	14	—	—	—	—	—
2010–11	Kazzinc–Torpedo	VHL	17	4	3	7	20	4	1	1	2	32
2010–11	Torpedo–2 Ust–Kamenogorsk	KAZ	6	2	3	5	2	—	—	—	—	—
2011–12	Yertis Pavlodar	KAZ	53	7	22	29	34	9	2	3	5	4
2012–13	Yertis Pavlodar	KAZ	51	15	17	32	32	14	1	12	13	8
2013–14	Arlan Kokshetau	KAZ	52	18	37	55	16	14	3	7	10	8
2014–15	Yertis Pavlodar	KAZ	51	8	8	16	30	12	0	3	3	4
RUS.2 totals			455	97	177	274	402	15	4	6	10	18
KAZ totals			322	82	153	235	184	49	6	25	31	24

=== International ===
Year	Team	Event	GP	G	A	Pts	PIM
1994	Kazakhstan	AJC	4	2	3	5	0
1996	Kazakhstan	WJC C	4	2	4	6	4
1998	Kazakhstan	WJC	7	4	2	6	10
1998	Kazakhstan	WC	3	0	0	0	10
1999	Kazakhstan	WC Q	3	1	1	2	2
2000	Kazakhstan	WC B	7	1	4	5	29
2003	Kazakhstan	WC D1	5	1	2	3	0
2004	Kazakhstan	WC	3	0	0	0	0
2005	Kazakhstan	WC	6	0	1	1	0
2006	Kazakhstan	OG	5	0	1	1	6
2006	Kazakhstan	WC	6	0	1	1	4
2007	Kazakhstan	WC D1	5	2	0	2	2
Junior totals			15	8	9	17	14
Senior totals			43	5	10	15	53
