= Andrei Ogorodnikov =

Kazakhstani ice hockey player

Andrei Gennadevich Ogorodnikov (Russian: Андрей Геннадьевич Огородников; born 29 August 1982) is a Kazakhstani former ice hockey forward. His career, which lasted from 1999 to 2020, was mainly spent in the Kazakhstan Vyschaya Liga. Internationally he played for the Kazakhstan national team at the 2006 Winter Olympics and at four World Championships.

== Career statistics ==
=== Regular season and playoffs ===
			Regular season					Playoffs
Season	Team	League	GP	G	A	Pts	PIM	GP	G	A	Pts	PIM
1999–00	Torpedo–2 Ust–Kamenogorsk	RUS-3	36	10	4	14	26	—	—	—	—	—
2000–01	Kazzinc–Torpedo	RUS-3	8	3	0	3	8	—	—	—	—	—
2000–01	Torpedo–2 Ust–Kamenogorsk	RUS.3	27	9	7	16	12	—	—	—	—	—
2001–02	Kazzinc–Torpedo	RUS-2	31	5	5	10	24	—	—	—	—	—
2001–02	Torpedo–2 Ust–Kamenogorsk	RUS-3	5	2	2	4	4	—	—	—	—	—
2002–03	Kazzinc–Torpedo	RUS-2	20	4	7	11	16	—	—	—	—	—
2002–03	Torpedo–2 Ust–Kamenogorsk	RUS-3	8	2	4	6	8	—	—	—	—	—
2003–04	Kazzinc–Torpedo	KAZ	20	16	14	30	6	—	—	—	—	—
2003–04	Kazzinc–Torpedo	RUS-2	32	15	10	25	8	—	—	—	—	—
2003–04	Torpedo–2 Ust–Kamenogorsk	RUS-3	3	3	3	6	2	—	—	—	—	—
2004–05	Kazzinc–Torpedo	KAZ	23	12	9	21	20	—	—	—	—	—
2004–05	Kazzinc–Torpedo	RUS-2	43	15	18	33	14	—	—	—	—	—
2005–06	SKA St. Petersburg	RSL	3	0	1	1	0	—	—	—	—	—
2005–06	SKA–2 St. Petersburg	RUS-3	2	1	4	5	6	—	—	—	—	—
2005–06	Kazzinc–Torpedo	KAZ	16	3	2	5	30	—	—	—	—	—
2005–06	Kazzinc–Torpedo	RUS-2	25	10	4	14	18	—	—	—	—	—
2006–07	Kazzinc–Torpedo	KAZ	23	5	8	13	14	—	—	—	—	—
2006–07	Kazzinc–Torpedo	RUS-2	41	21	19	40	26	—	—	—	—	—
2007–08	Kazzinc–Torpedo	RUS-2	48	10	26	36	44	4	1	0	1	2
2008–09	Yermak Angarsk	RUS-2	52	10	14	24	46	5	0	0	0	2
2009–10	HC Yugra	RUS-2	2	0	0	0	0	—	—	—	—	—
2009–10	Kazzinc–Torpedo	RUS-2	28	7	6	13	22	7	2	2	4	6
2009–10	Torpedo–2 Ust–Kamenogorsk	KAZ	6	0	3	3	0	—	—	—	—	—
2010–11	Kazzinc–Torpedo	VHL	42	9	17	26	32	5	0	0	0	4
2010–11	Torpedo–2 Ust–Kamenogorsk	KAZ	1	0	0	0	0	—	—	—	—	—
2011–12	Ertis Pavlodar	KAZ	49	15	23	38	20	15	2	6	8	6
2012–13	Kazzinc–Torpedo	VHL	42	9	22	31	12	3	0	0	0	0
2012–13	Torpedo–2 Ust–Kamenogorsk	KAZ	3	0	0	0	2	—	—	—	—	—
2013–14	Kazzinc–Torpedo	VHL	41	4	17	21	24	6	1	1	2	0
2014–15	Arlan Kokshetau	KAZ	16	0	13	13	18	—	—	—	—	—
2014–15	HK Almaty	KAZ	17	4	6	10	6	7	1	3	4	4
2015–16	HK Almaty	KAZ	53	16	33	49	22	2	0	0	0	6
2016–17	Beibarys Atyrau	KAZ	46	5	16	21	8	3	1	0	1	2
2017–18	HK Almaty	KAZ	41	6	12	18	12	4	0	2	2	2
2018–19	Torpedo Ust–Kamenogorsk	KAZ	16	2	3	5	6	3	0	2	2	2
2019–20	HK Aktobe	KAZ	48	4	18	22	18	—	—	—	—	—
RUS-2 totals			322	95	111	206	218	16	3	2	5	10
KAZ totals			378	88	160	248	182	34	4	13	17	22

=== International ===
Year	Team	Event	GP	G	A	Pts	PIM
1999	Kazakhstan	EJC D1	3	4	1	5	2
2000	Kazakhstan	EJC D1	4	1	4	5	0
2001	Kazakhstan	WJC	6	1	0	1	4
2002	Kazakhstan	WJC D1	5	7	4	11	2
2005	Kazakhstan	OGQ	3	0	0	0	0
2005	Kazakhstan	WC	6	1	0	1	2
2006	Kazakhstan	OG	5	0	0	0	4
2006	Kazakhstan	WC	3	0	0	0	0
2007	Kazakhstan	WC D1	5	0	2	2	2
2008	Kazakhstan	WC D1	5	1	2	3	0
2009	Kazakhstan	OGQ	3	1	1	2	0
Junior totals			18	13	9	22	8
Senior totals			30	3	5	8	8
