= Sergei Yakovenko =

- Born: 24 March 1976 (age 48); Karaganda, Kazakh SSR
- Height: 1.85 m (6 ft 1 in)
- Weight: 100 kg (220 lb; 15 st 10 lb)
- Position: Defence
- Shot: Left
- KAZ team: Arystan Temirtau
- National team: Kazakhstan
- Playing career: 1992–2014

Sergei Yakovenko (born 24 March 1976 in Karaganda) is a Kazakhstani professional ice hockey player currently playing for Arystan Temirtau in the Kazakhstan Hockey Championship league. He previously played for Sary Arka Karaganda and was a member of the Kazakhstan men's national ice hockey team at the 2012 IIHF World Championship.

== Career statistics ==
			Regular season					Playoffs
Season	Team	League	GP	G	A	Pts	PIM	GP	G	A	Pts	PIM
1992–82	Avtomobilist Karaganda	Russia	1	0	0	0	0	—	—	—	—	—
1993–94	Bulat Temirtau	Russia2	28	0	0	0	12	—	—	—	—	—
1994–95	Stroitel Karaganda	Russia	31	1	0	1	12	—	—	—	—	—
1995–96	Stroitel Karaganda	Russia	46	3	6	9	32	—	—	—	—	—
1996–97	Neftekhimik Nizhnekamsk	Russia	17	0	1	1	18	2	0	0	0	0
1996–97	Neftekhimik Nizhnekamsk-2	Russia3	9	2	2	4	6	—	—	—	—	—
1997–98	Neftekhimik Nizhnekamsk	Russia	10	0	2	2	0	—	—	—	—	—
1997–98	SKA-Amur Khabarovsk	Russia	7	0	2	2	0	—	—	—	—	—
1998–99	Nosta Yuzhny Ural Novotroitsk-Orsk	Russia2	31	4	5	9	26	—	—	—	—	—
1999–00	Nosta Yuzhny Ural Novotroitsk-Orsk	Russia2	37	3	2	5	32	—	—	—	—	—
2000–01	Nosta Yuzhny Ural Novotroitsk-Orsk	Russia2	40	8	7	15	63	—	—	—	—	—
2000–01	Traktor Chelyabinsk	Russia2	4	1	0	1	0	—	—	—	—	—
2001–02	Traktor Chelyabinsk	Russia2	53	7	7	14	46	—	—	—	—	—
2002–03	Traktor Chelyabinsk	Russia2	3	0	0	0	2	—	—	—	—	—
2002–03	Yuzhny Ural Orsk	Russia2	8	0	0	0	12	—	—	—	—	—
2002–03	Metallurg Serov	Russia2	4	0	1	1	4	—	—	—	—	—
2003–04	Kazakhmis Karaganda	Kazakhstan	22	4	7	11	14	—	—	—	—	—
2003–04	Kazakhmis Karaganda	Russia2	30	0	2	2	30	—	—	—	—	—
2003–04	Kazakhmis Karaganda-2	Russia3	6	2	7	9	2	—	—	—	—	—
2004–05	Irtysh Pavlodar	Kazakhstan	26	6	8	14	16	—	—	—	—	—
2005–06	Irtysh Pavlodar	Kazakhstan	2	0	0	0	0	—	—	—	—	—
2005–06	Kazakhmis Karaganda	Kazakhstan	9	0	4	4	10	—	—	—	—	—
2005–06	Kazakhmis Karaganda	Russia2	30	6	5	11	24	—	—	—	—	—
2006–07	Kazakhmis Satpaev	Kazakhstan	23	1	4	5	20	—	—	—	—	—
2006–07	Kazakhmis Satpaev	Russia2	53	3	24	27	46	—	—	—	—	—
2007–08	Kazakhmis Satpaev	Russia2	27	6	12	18	22	—	—	—	—	—
2007–08	Barys Astana	Russia2	22	4	4	8	28	7	2	1	3	2
2008–09	Mechel Chelyabinsk	Russia2	40	2	6	8	46	7	1	0	1	2
2008–09	Mechel Chelyabinsk-2	Russia3	1	1	1	2	0	—	—	—	—	—
2009–10	Mechel Chelyabinsk	Russia2	42	5	4	9	30	5	0	2	2	6
2010–11	Saryarka Karaganda	Kazakhstan	52	12	16	28	34	15	1	6	7	12
2011–12	Saryarka Karaganda	Kazakhstan	46	7	22	29	22	9	1	2	3	4
2012–13	Arystan Temirtau	Kazakhstan	54	1	18	19	32	13	0	4	4	8
2013–14	Arystan Temirtau	Kazakhstan	27	1	6	7	12	13	0	1	1	2
Russia totals			112	4	11	15	62	2	0	0	0	0
Kazakhstan totals			261	32	85	117	160	50	2	13	15	26
