= Vadim Rifel =

- Born: February 19, 1979 (age 46); Ust-Kamenogorsk, Kazakh SSR, Soviet Union
- Height: 6 ft 0 in (183 cm)
- Weight: 176 lb (80 kg; 12 st 8 lb)
- Position: Left wing
- Shot: Left
- Played for: EHC Freiburg; Yertis Pavlodar; Kazzinc-Torpedo; Arlan Kokshetau
- National team: Kazakhstan
- Playing career: 1997–2015

Vadim Rifel
Medal record

Men's ice hockey

Representing Kazakhstan

Asian Games
Silver medal – second place	2003 Aomori	Ice hockey
Silver medal – second place	2007 Changchun	Ice hockey

Vadim Vladimirovich Rifel (Russian: Вадим Владимирович Рифель; born February 19, 1979) is a professional hockey player from Kazakhstan. He's played internationally with the Kazakhstan men's national ice hockey team 8 times in the Ice Hockey World Championships. For the 2010-2011 season he was voted as the best player on his team by local fans. He previously played 4 seasons with EHC Freiburg in Germany.

== Career statistics ==
			Regular season					Playoffs
Season	Team	League	GP	G	A	Pts	PIM	GP	G	A	Pts	PIM
1995–96	Torpedo Ust-Kamenogorsk-2	Russia2	7	0	0	0	2	—	—	—	—	—
1996–97	Torpedo Ust-Kamenogorsk	Russia2	1	0	0	0	0	—	—	—	—	—
1996–97	Torpedo Ust-Kamenogorsk-2	Russia3	31	6	7	13	8	—	—	—	—	—
1997–98	Torpedo Ust-Kamenogorsk	Russia2	6	0	0	0	4	—	—	—	—	—
1997–98	Torpedo Ust-Kamenogorsk-2	Russia3	45	14	10	24	20	—	—	—	—	—
1998–99	Torpedo Ust-Kamenogorsk	Russia2	—	—	—	—	—	12	0	1	1	2
1998–99	Torpedo Ust-Kamenogorsk-2	Russia3	31	12	9	21	10	—	—	—	—	—
1999–00	Torpedo Ust-Kamenogorsk	Russia3	35	16	16	32	20	—	—	—	—	—
2000–01	Torpedo Ust-Kamenogorsk	Russia3	51	33	38	71	34	—	—	—	—	—
2001–02	Torpedo Ust-Kamenogorsk	Russia2	42	12	8	20	28	—	—	—	—	—
2001–02	Torpedo Ust-Kamenogorsk-2	Russia3	1	0	0	0	0	—	—	—	—	—
2002–03	Kazzinc-Torpedo	Russia2	35	13	11	24	32	—	—	—	—	—
2002–03	Torpedo Ust-Kamenogorsk-2	Russia3	2	2	3	5	0	—	—	—	—	—
2003–04	Kazzinc-Torpedo	Kazakhstan	22	14	24	38	8	—	—	—	—	—
2003–04	Kazzinc-Torpedo	Russia2	35	10	13	23	22	—	—	—	—	—
2004–05	Wölfe Freiburg	Germany2	52	20	16	36	36	—	—	—	—	—
2005–06	Wölfe Freiburg	Germany2	52	14	19	33	76	—	—	—	—	—
2006–07	Kazzinc-Torpedo	Kazakhstan	20	8	16	24	14	—	—	—	—	—
2006–07	Kazzinc-Torpedo	Russia2	56	19	26	45	76	—	—	—	—	—
2007–08	Kazzinc-Torpedo	Russia2	42	13	17	30	30	5	1	3	4	6
2008–09	Kazzinc-Torpedo	Russia2	37	4	24	28	46	4	1	1	2	2
2009–10	Kazzinc-Torpedo	Russia2	42	11	23	34	52	7	1	3	4	12
2009–10	Kazzinc-Torpedo	Kazakhstan	8	4	2	6	4	—	—	—	—	—
2010–11	Kazzinc-Torpedo	VHL	38	7	9	16	32	2	1	1	2	0
2010–11	Torpedo Ust-Kamenogorsk-2	Kazakhstan	4	0	2	2	4	—	—	—	—	—
2011–12	Kazzinc-Torpedo	VHL	21	4	4	8	10	—	—	—	—	—
2011–12	Torpedo Ust-Kamenogorsk-2	Kazakhstan	6	3	4	7	10	—	—	—	—	—
2011–12	Ertis Pavlodar	Kazakhstan	—	—	—	—	—	15	4	3	7	16
2012–13	Kazzinc-Torpedo	VHL	50	14	17	31	26	3	0	0	0	2
2013–14	Kazzinc-Torpedo	VHL	7	2	0	2	6	—	—	—	—	—
2013–14	Torpedo Ust-Kamenogorsk-2	Kazakhstan	1	0	0	0	0	—	—	—	—	—
2013–14	Arlan Kokshetau	Kazakhstan	8	1	3	4	6	—	—	—	—	—
2013–14	Yuzhny Ural Orsk	VHL	21	3	8	11	12	11	3	3	6	10
2014–15	Kazzinc-Torpedo	VHL	13	0	0	0	6	—	—	—	—	—
2014–15	Torpedo Ust-Kamenogorsk-2	Kazakhstan	6	1	2	3	2	—	—	—	—	—
Russia2 totals			303	82	122	204	292	28	3	8	11	22
Russia3 totals			196	83	83	166	92	—	—	—	—	—
VHL totals			150	30	38	68	92	16	4	4	8	12
Germany2 totals			104	34	35	69	112	20	2	13	15	20
