= Sergei Miroshnichenko (ice hockey) =

Kazakhstani ice hockey player

- Born: June 21, 1979 (age 47) Ust-Kamenogorsk, Kazakh SSR, Soviet Union
- Height: 5 ft 11 in (180 cm)
- Weight: 220 lb (100 kg; 15 st 10 lb)
- Position: Defenceman
- Shot: Left
- Played for: Kazzinc-Torpedo; Kazakhmys Satpaev; Saryarka Karagandy; Gornyak Rudny; Yertis Pavlodar
- National team: Kazakhstan
- NHL draft: Undrafted
- Playing career: 1997–2017
Medal record
Men's ice hockey
Representing Kazakhstan
Asian Winter Games
Silver medal – second place	2007 Changchun	Ice hockey

Sergei Yurevich Miroshnichenko (Russian: Сергей Юрьевич Мирошниченко; born June 21, 1979) is a Kazakhstani professional ice hockey defenceman who currently plays for Yertis Pavlodar of the Kazakhstan Hockey Championship.

== Career statistics ==
			Regular season					Playoffs
Season	Team	League	GP	G	A	Pts	PIM	GP	G	A	Pts	PIM
1995–96	Torpedo Ust-Kamenogorsk-2	Russia2	2	0	0	0	0	—	—	—	—	—
1996–97	Torpedo Ust-Kamenogorsk-2	Russia3	14	1	0	1	8	—	—	—	—	—
1997–98	Torpedo Ust-Kamenogorsk	Russia2	7	1	0	1	2	—	—	—	—	—
1997–98	Torpedo Ust-Kamenogorsk-2	Russia3	44	9	4	13	51	—	—	—	—	—
1998–98	Torpedo Ust-Kamenogorsk	Russia2	3	0	0	0	0	12	0	4	4	18
1998–99	Torpedo Ust-Kamenogorsk-2	Russia3	30	1	3	4	75	—	—	—	—	—
1999–00	Torpedo Ust-Kamenogorsk	Russia3	33	9	13	22	18	—	—	—	—	—
2000–01	Torpedo Ust-Kamenogorsk-2	Russia3	47	16	13	29	84	—	—	—	—	—
2001–02	Torpedo Ust-Kamenogorsk	Russia2	4	3	1	4	2	—	—	—	—	—
2001–02	Torpedo Ust-Kamenogorsk-2	Russia3	37	18	13	31	79	—	—	—	—	—
2002–03	Kazzinc-Torpedo	Russia2	3	1	0	1	2	—	—	—	—	—
2002–03	Torpedo Ust-Kamenogorsk-2	Russia3	17	8	4	12	16	—	—	—	—	—
2002–03	Barys Astana	Russia3	6	2	1	3	34	—	—	—	—	—
2003–04	Gornyak Rudny	Kazakhstan	23	17	6	23	10	—	—	—	—	—
2003–04	Gornyak Rudny	Russia3	59	11	17	28	107	—	—	—	—	—
2004–05	Gornyak Rudny	Kazakhstan	28	5	7	12	30	—	—	—	—	—
2004–05	Gornyak Rudny	Russia3	63	17	17	34	52	—	—	—	—	—
2005–06	Kazzinc-Torpedo	Kazakhstan	19	3	5	8	26	—	—	—	—	—
2005–06	Kazzinc-Torpedo	Russia2	40	7	2	9	42	—	—	—	—	—
2005–06	Torpedo Ust-Kamenogorsk-2	Russia3	2	0	0	0	6	—	—	—	—	—
2006–07	Kazzinc-Torpedo	Kazakhstan	19	2	5	7	20	—	—	—	—	—
2006–07	Kazzinc-Torpedo	Russia2	50	4	7	11	52	—	—	—	—	—
2007–08	Kazzinc-Torpedo	Russia2	47	9	5	14	69	6	1	1	2	8
2008–09	Kazakhmys Satpaev	Russia3	38	10	5	15	44	—	—	—	—	—
2009–10	Saryaka Karagandy	Kazakhstan	51	15	16	31	145	8	1	1	2	4
2010–11	Ertis Pavlodar	Kazakhstan	49	9	21	30	58	13	3	2	5	20
2011–12	Ertis Pavlodar	Kazakhstan	45	12	18	30	70	15	4	3	7	18
2012–13	Ertis Pavlodar	Kazakhstan	44	12	9	21	78	14	3	3	6	4
2013–14	Ertis Pavlodar	Kazakhstan	48	11	12	23	48	13	2	0	2	8
2014–15	Ertis Pavlodar	Kazakhstan	50	7	16	23	72	13	3	1	4	26
2015–16	Ertis Pavlodar	Kazakhstan	50	7	9	16	44	11	0	1	1	4
2016–17	Ertis Pavlodar	Kazakhstan	17	0	3	3	36	—	—	—	—	—
Kazakhstan totals			443	100	127	227	637	87	16	11	27	84
