= Andrei Savenkov =

Kazakhstani ice hockey player

Andrey Vladimirovich Savenkov (born March 7, 1975) is a Kazakhstani ice hockey player who was a member of the Kazakhstan men's national ice hockey team at the 2006 Winter Olympics and as well as the 1998 Winter Olympics.

== Career statistics ==
=== Regular season and playoffs ===
			Regular season					Playoffs
Season	Team	League	GP	G	A	Pts	PIM	GP	G	A	Pts	PIM
1991–92	Torpedo Ust–Kamenogorsk	CIS	4	0	0	0	0	1	0	0	0	0
1991–92	ShVSM Ust–Kamenogorsk	CIS.3	31	2	2	4	29	—	—	—	—	—
1992–93	Torpedo Ust–Kamenogorsk	IHL	2	0	0	0	0	—	—	—	—	—
1992–93	Torpedo–2 Ust–Kamenogorsk	RUS.2	24	6	2	8	22	—	—	—	—	—
1993–94	Torpedo Ust–Kamenogorsk	IHL	41	3	3	6	30	—	—	—	—	—
1994–95	Torpedo Ust–Kamenogorsk	IHL	51	9	6	15	30	2	0	1	1	0
1994–95	Torpedo–2 Ust–Kamenogorsk	RUS.2		1				—	—	—	—	—
1995–96	Torpedo Ust–Kamenogorsk	IHL	49	6	10	16	44	—	—	—	—	—
1996–97	Torpedo Yaroslavl	RSL	18	1	0	1	37	—	—	—	—	—
1996–97	Torpedo–2 Yaroslavl	RUS.3	19	7	6	13	12	—	—	—	—	—
1997–98	Sibir Novosibirsk	RSL	25	0	2	2	51	—	—	—	—	—
1998–99	CSKA Moscow	RUS.2	26	2	5	7	16	—	—	—	—	—
1999–2000	Torpedo Nizhny Novgorod	RSL	3	0	0	0	2	—	—	—	—	—
1999–2000	Rubin Tyumen	RUS.2	8	2	0	2	2	—	—	—	—	—
1999–2000	Sibir Novosibirsk	RUS.2	8	1	1	2	26	14	0	2	2	8
2000–01	Sibir Novosibirsk	RUS.2	23	3	5	8	6	12	4	2	6	16
2001–02	Kazzinc–Torpedo	RUS.2	51	12	10	22	36	—	—	—	—	—
2002–03	Kazzinc–Torpedo	RUS.2	44	6	6	12	16	—	—	—	—	—
2003–04	Kazzinc–Torpedo	KAZ	15	6	7	13	6	—	—	—	—	—
2003–04	Kazzinc–Torpedo	RUS.2	42	3	9	12	20	—	—	—	—	—
2004–05	Kazzinc–Torpedo	KAZ	22	2	6	8	8	—	—	—	—	—
2004–05	Kazzinc–Torpedo	RUS.2	51	6	12	18	18	—	—	—	—	—
2005–06	Kazzinc–Torpedo	KAZ	18	2	5	7	10	—	—	—	—	—
2005–06	Kazzinc–Torpedo	RUS.2	39	4	10	14	40	—	—	—	—	—
2006–07	Barys Astana	KAZ	2	0	1	1	2	—	—	—	—	—
2006–07	Barys Astana	RUS.3	20	2	5	7	12	—	—	—	—	—
2006–07	Kazzinc–Torpedo	KAZ	17	2	7	9	8	—	—	—	—	—
2006–07	Kazzinc–Torpedo	RUS.2	38	4	6	10	38	—	—	—	—	—
2007–08	Kazzinc–Torpedo	RUS.2	6	0	2	2	12	—	—	—	—	—
2007–08	Kazakhmys Satpaev	RUS.2	21	1	3	4	12	10	1	4	5	6
2008–09	Kazakhmys Satpaev	RUS.3	39	7	15	22	8	—	—	—	—	—
2009–10	Yertis Pavlodar	KAZ	53	6	14	20	44	7	2	1	3	0
2010–11	Yertis Pavlodar	KAZ	38	1	11	12	22	1	0	0	0	0
IHL totals			143	18	19	37	104	2	0	1	1	0
RUS.2 totals			379	50	71	121	264	36	5	8	13	30
KAZ totals			166	19	51	70	100	8	2	1	3	0

- RUS.2 totals do not include numbers from the 1994–95 season.

=== International ===
Year	Team	Event	GP	G	A	Pts	PIM
1993	Kazakhstan	AJC	4	5	7	12	2
1995	Kazakhstan	WC C	4	2	0	2	0
1996	Kazakhstan	WC C	7	2	1	3	4
1997	Kazakhstan	WC B	7	0	2	2	12
1998	Kazakhstan	OG	7	0	1	1	4
1999	Kazakhstan	WC B	7	2	3	5	8
1999	Kazakhstan	WC Q	3	0	0	0	0
2002	Kazakhstan	WC D1	5	1	0	1	4
2003	Kazakhstan	WC D1	5	0	2	2	4
2004	Kazakhstan	WC	6	0	0	0	0
2006	Kazakhstan	OG	2	0	1	1	0
2006	Kazakhstan	WC	6	0	0	0	14
2007	Kazakhstan	WC D1	5	0	3	3	4
Senior totals			64	7	13	20	54
