= Maxim Komissarov =

Kazakhstani ice hockey player

- Born: December 24, 1972 (age 52); Oskemen, Kazakh SSR, USSR
- Height: 5 ft 10 in (178 cm)
- Weight: 187 lb (85 kg; 13 st 5 lb)
- Position: Right wing
- Shot: Left
- Played for: Torpedo Ust-Kamenogorsk; Sibir Novosibirsk; Ertis Pavlodar; Kazakhmis Satpaev
- National team: Kazakhstan
- Playing career: 1991–2011

Maxim Komissarov
Medal record

Men's ice hockey

Representing Kazakhstan

Asian Games
Gold medal – first place	1999 Gangwon	Ice hockey
Silver medal – second place	2003 Aomori	Ice hockey
Silver medal – second place	2007 Changchun	Ice hockey

Maxim Komissarov (born December 24, 1972) is a Kazakhstani hockey player currently playing for Ertis Pavlodar. He played was a member of the 2007 Kazakhstan men's national ice hockey team. He played for Ust-Kamenogorsk Torpedo in his junior career.

== Career statistics ==
			Regular season					Playoffs
Season	Team	League	GP	G	A	Pts	PIM	GP	G	A	Pts	PIM
1991–92	Torpedo Ust-Kamenogorsk	Soviet	6	1	0	1	0	6	0	2	2	0
1991–92	Torpedo Ust-Kamenogorsk-2	Soviet3	33	19	6	25	10	—	—	—	—	—
1992–93	Torpedo Ust-Kamenogorsk	Russia	38	8	3	11	12	3	0	0	0	0
1992–93	Torpedo Ust-Kamenogorsk-2	Russia2	7	4	3	7	0	—	—	—	—	—
1993–94	Torpedo Ust-Kamenogorsk	Russia	41	7	1	8	17	—	—	—	—	—
1993–94	Torpedo Ust-Kamenogorsk-2	Russia3	—	5	2	7	—	—	—	—	—	—
1994–95	Torpedo Ust-Kamenogorsk	Russia	44	9	5	14	39	2	0	0	0	0
1994–95	Torpedo Ust-Kamenogorsk-2	Russia2	—	2	—	—	—	—	—	—	—	—
1995–96	Torpedo Ust-Kamenogorsk	Russia	34	9	0	9	8	—	—	—	—	—
1995–96	Torpedo Ust-Kamenogorsk-2	Russia3	10	5	4	9	4	—	—	—	—	—
1996–97	Torpedo Ust-Kamenogorsk	Russia2	28	10	7	17	6	—	—	—	—	—
1996–97	Torpedo Ust-Kamenogorsk-2	Russia3	1	0	1	1	0	—	—	—	—	—
1996–97	Sibir Novosibirsk	Russia	12	1	4	5	2	—	—	—	—	—
1997–98	Sibir Novosibirsk	Russia	25	4	4	8	10	—	—	—	—	—
1998–99	Torpedo Ust-Kamenogorsk	Russia2	32	7	8	15	20	—	—	—	—	—
1998–99	Torpedo Ust-Kamenogorsk-2	Russia3	5	3	1	4	0	—	—	—	—	—
1998–99	Sibir Novosibirsk	Russia2	8	0	2	2	2	—	—	—	—	—
1999–00	Torpedo Ust-Kamenogorsk	Russia3	36	32	19	51	14	—	—	—	—	—
1999–00	Torpedo Ust-Kamenogorsk-2	Kazakhstan	—	—	—	—	—	—	—	—	—	—
2000–01	Torpedo Ust-Kamenogorsk	Russia3	32	21	21	42	8	—	—	—	—	—
2001–02	Torpedo Ust-Kamenogorsk	Russia2	50	11	15	26	47	—	—	—	—	—
2001–02	Torpedo Ust-Kamenogorsk-2	Russia3	1	0	1	1	0	—	—	—	—	—
2002–03	Kazzinc-Torpedo	Russia2	32	7	5	12	26	—	—	—	—	—
2002–03	Torpedo Ust-Kamenogorsk-2	Russia3	1	0	0	0	0	—	—	—	—	—
2003–04	Kazzinc-Torpedo	Kazakhstan	18	14	6	20	6	—	—	—	—	—
2003–04	Kazzinc-Torpedo	Russia2	39	10	9	19	24	—	—	—	—	—
2003–04	Torpedo Ust-Kamenogorsk-2	Russia3	3	2	1	3	2	—	—	—	—	—
2004–05	Kazzinc-Torpedo	Kazakhstan	21	7	8	15	4	—	—	—	—	—
2004–05	Kazzinc-Torpedo	Russia2	35	10	5	15	12	—	—	—	—	—
2005–06	Kazzinc-Torpedo	Kazakhstan	16	2	5	7	2	—	—	—	—	—
2005–06	Kazzinc-Torpedo	Russia2	36	1	3	4	14	—	—	—	—	—
2005–06	Torpedo Ust-Kamenogorsk-2	Russia3	2	0	1	1	0	—	—	—	—	—
2006–07	Kazzinc-Torpedo	Kazakhstan	16	3	5	8	6	—	—	—	—	—
2006–07	Kazzinc-Torpedo	Russia2	54	10	18	28	14	—	—	—	—	—
2007–08	Kazakhmis Satpaev	Russia2	44	7	6	13	10	9	0	4	4	14
2008–09	Kazzinc-Torpedo	Russia2	43	8	8	16	22	4	0	0	0	2
2009–10	Ertis Pavlodar	Kazakhstan	54	9	10	19	22	4	1	2	3	4
2010–11	Ertis Pavlodar	Kazakhstan	44	8	7	15	18	11	0	1	1	8
Kazakhstan totals			169	43	41	84	58	15	1	3	4	12
Russia totals			194	38	17	55	88	27	4	2	6	6
Russia2 totals			418	92	93	183	201	25	1	6	7	22
