= Oleg Kovalenko (ice hockey) =

Kazakhstani ice hockey player

- Born: February 11, 1975 (age 50); Ust'-Kamenogorsk, Kazakhstan
- Height: 5 ft 10 in (178 cm)
- Weight: 198 lb (90 kg; 14 st 2 lb)
- Position: Defense
- Shot: Right
- Played for: Kazzinc-Torpedo; Brockville Braves; Erie Panthers; Neftekhimik Nizhnekamsk; Metallurg Novokuznetsk; Avangard Omsk; Salavat Yulaev Ufa; Barys Astana
- National team: Kazakhstan
- NHL draft: Undrafted
- Playing career: 1990–2010

Oleg Kovalenko
Medal record

Men's ice hockey

Representing Kazakhstan

Asian Games
Silver medal – second place	2003 Aomori	Ice hockey
Silver medal – second place	2007 Changchun	Ice hockey

Oleg Yevgenievich Kovalenko (Russian: Олег Евгеньевич Коваленков, born February 11, 1975) is a Kazakhstani ice hockey player who is a defenceman and was part of the Kazakhstan men's national ice hockey team at the 2006 Winter Olympics. He last played for Kazzinc Torpedo-2 Ust Kamenogorsk in Kazakhstan's second highest hockey league (after the Kazakhstani Championship) Kazakhstan Vyschaya Liga in the 2010 year.

== Career statistics ==
=== Regular season and playoffs ===
			Regular season					Playoffs
Season	Team	League	GP	G	A	Pts	PIM	GP	G	A	Pts	PIM
1990–91	Torpedo Ust–Kamenogorsk	Soviet	2	0	0	0	0	—	—	—	—	—
1991–92	Torpedo Ust–Kamenogorsk	CIS	7	0	0	0	2	3	0	0	0	0
1991–92	Torpedo–2 Ust–Kamenogorsk	CIS.3	9	0	0	0	6	—	—	—	—	—
1992–93	Torpedo Ust–Kamenogorsk	IHL	11	0	0	0	4	—	—	—	—	—
1992–93	Torpedo–2 Ust–Kamenogorsk	RUS.2	30	2	0	2	32	—	—	—	—	—
1993–94	Brockville Braves	CJHL	33	11	19	30	84	—	—	—	—	—
1993–94	Erie Panthers	ECHL	6	0	1	1	4	—	—	—	—	—
1994–95	Torpedo Ust–Kamenogorsk	IHL	51	3	4	7	53	2	0	1	1	4
1995–96	Torpedo Ust–Kamenogorsk	IHL	43	2	2	4	48	—	—	—	—	—
1995–96	Torpedo–2 Ust–Kamenogorsk	RUS.2	3	0	0	0	2	—	—	—	—	—
1996–97	Torpedo Ust–Kamenogorsk	RUS.2	26	3	6	9	18	—	—	—	—	—
1996–97	Neftekhimik Nizhnekamsk	RSL	14	2	1	3	10	2	0	0	0	0
1997–98	Metallurg Novokuznetsk	RSL	12	0	0	0	4	—	—	—	—	—
1997–98	Metallurg–2 Novokuznetsk	RUS.3	5	3	0	3	6	—	—	—	—	—
1997–98	Avangard Omsk	RSL	4	0	0	0	2	—	—	—	—	—
1997–98	Avangard–2 Omsk	RUS.3	10	0	3	3	12	—	—	—	—	—
1998–99	Salavat Yulaev Ufa	RSL	41	2	5	7	38	4	0	0	0	2
1999–2000	Salavat Yulaev Ufa	RSL	38	2	2	4	18	—	—	—	—	—
2000–01	Salavat Yulaev Ufa	RSL	38	1	1	2	12	—	—	—	—	—
2000–01	Salavat Yulaev–2 Ufa	RUS.3	8	3	5	8	16	—	—	—	—	—
2001–02	Kazzinc–Torpedo	RUS.2	53	11	9	20	44	—	—	—	—	—
2002–03	Kazzinc–Torpedo	RUS.2	48	4	10	14	48	—	—	—	—	—
2003–04	Kazzinc–Torpedo	KAZ	21	8	9	17	2	—	—	—	—	—
2003–04	Kazzinc–Torpedo	RUS.2	44	3	10	13	44	—	—	—	—	—
2004–05	Kazzinc–Torpedo	KAZ	26	5	9	14	26	—	—	—	—	—
2004–05	Kazzinc–Torpedo	RUS.2	51	8	7	15	43	—	—	—	—	—
2005–06	Kazzinc–Torpedo	KAZ	20	7	1	8	18	—	—	—	—	—
2005–06	Kazzinc–Torpedo	RUS.2	42	8	5	13	32	—	—	—	—	—
2006–07	Barys Astana	RUS.3	14	0	2	2	10	—	—	—	—	—
2006–07	Kazzinc–Torpedo	KAZ	17	1	1	2	10	—	—	—	—	—
2006–07	Kazzinc–Torpedo	RUS.2	31	4	6	10	26	—	—	—	—	—
2007–08	Kazzinc–Torpedo	RUS.2	42	3	4	7	36	7	0	2	2	2
2008–09	Kazzinc–Torpedo	RUS.2	52	4	9	13	60	4	0	1	1	2
2009–10	Kazzinc–Torpedo	RUS.2	22	6	5	11	16	6	0	1	1	6
2009–10	Torpedo–2 Ust–Kamenogorsk	KAZ	3	0	0	0	2	—	—	—	—	—
IHL & RSL totals			252	12	15	27	189	8	0	1	1	6
RUS.2 totals			444	56	71	127	401	17	0	4	4	10

=== International ===
Year	Team	Event	GP	G	A	Pts	PIM
1993	Kazakhstan	AJC	4	1	5	6	4
1995	Kazakhstan	WC C	4	1	0	1	4
1996	Kazakhstan	WC C	7	6	5	11	4
1997	Kazakhstan	WC B	5	1	0	1	0
1999	Kazakhstan	WC Q	3	0	0	0	0
2002	Kazakhstan	WC D1	5	0	3	3	6
2003	Kazakhstan	WC D1	5	2	3	5	2
2004	Kazakhstan	WC	6	0	2	2	2
2005	Kazakhstan	OGQ	3	0	1	1	0
2005	Kazakhstan	WC	6	0	1	1	2
2006	Kazakhstan	OG	5	0	0	0	4
2006	Kazakhstan	WC	6	0	0	0	6
2007	Kazakhstan	WC D1	5	0	0	0	2
Senior totals			60	10	15	25	32
