= Artyom Argokov =

Kazakhstani ice hockey player

Artyom Vladimirovich Argokov (Russian: Артём Владимирович Аргоков; born January 16, 1976) is a Kazakhstani professional ice hockey player who is a defenceman for Beibarys Atyrau. He played for the Kazakhstan men's national ice hockey team in the 2006 Winter Olympics and the 2007 World Ice Hockey Championships.

== Career statistics ==
=== Regular season and playoffs ===
			Regular season					Playoffs
Season	Team	League	GP	G	A	Pts	PIM	GP	G	A	Pts	PIM
1992–93	Torpedo–2 Ust–Kamenogorsk	RUS.2	8	1	1	2	4	—	—	—	—	—
1993–94	Torpedo Ust–Kamenogorsk	IHL	1	0	0	0	0	—	—	—	—	—
1993–94	Torpedo–2 Ust–Kamenogorsk	RUS.3
1994–95	SK Belovo	RUS.2	22	3	1	4	20	—	—	—	—	—
1995–96	Metallurg Novokuznetsk	IHL	47	1	2	3	80	—	—	—	—	—
1996–97	Metallurg Novokuznetsk	RSL	43	2	3	5	20	—	—	—	—	—
1997–98	Metallurg Novokuznetsk	RSL	18	3	1	4	8	—	—	—	—	—
1998–99	Lada Togliatti	RSL	41	1	2	3	28	7	0	0	0	0
1999–2000	CSK VVS Samara	RSL	2	0	0	0	6	—	—	—	—	—
1999–2000	Amur Khabarovsk	RSL	20	1	1	2	14	4	0	0	0	10
1999–2000	Amur–2 Khabarovsk	RUS.3	1	1	0	1	0	—	—	—	—	—
2000–01	Metallurg Novokuznetsk	RSL	44	1	2	3	26	—	—	—	—	—
2001–02	Metallurg Novokuznetsk	RSL	21	0	4	4	8	—	—	—	—	—
2002–03	Traktor Chelyabinsk	RUS.2	8	0	1	1	2	—	—	—	—	—
2002–03	Kazzinc–Torpedo	RUS.2	16	0	4	4	18	—	—	—	—	—
2003–04	Kazzinc–Torpedo	KAZ	21	8	8	16	8	—	—	—	—	—
2003–04	Kazzinc–Torpedo	RUS.2	52	3	5	8	24	—	—	—	—	—
2004–05	Kazzinc–Torpedo	KAZ	26	2	9	11	28	—	—	—	—	—
2004–05	Kazzinc–Torpedo	RUS.2	52	1	5	6	40	—	—	—	—	—
2005–06	Metallurg Novokuznetsk	RSL	38	2	3	5	24	3	0	0	0	0
2005–06	Metallurg–2 Novokuznetsk	RUS.3	5	1	3	4	4	—	—	—	—	—
2006–07	Kazzinc–Torpedo	KAZ	21	3	4	7	24	—	—	—	—	—
2006–07	Kazzinc–Torpedo	RUS.2	56	4	14	19	86	—	—	—	—	—
2007–08	Kazzinc–Torpedo	RUS.2	48	7	10	17	24	7	1	0	1	4
2008–09	Kazzinc–Torpedo	RUS.2	48	6	10	16	40	4	0	1	1	29
2009–10	Kazzinc–Torpedo	RUS.2	38	8	11	19	36	7	1	0	1	16
2009–10	Torpedo–2 Ust–Kamenogorsk	KAZ	10	1	4	5	16	—	—	—	—	—
2010–11	Beibarys Atyrau	KAZ	53	2	13	15	38	13	0	2	2	6
2011–12	Beibarys Atyrau	KAZ	48	2	13	15	16	13	0	1	1	10
2012–13	Beibarys Atyrau	KAZ	48	1	12	13	28	7	0	1	1	0
2013–14	Beibarys Atyrau	KAZ	47	3	11	14	22	15	1	1	2	8
2014–15	Kazzinc–Torpedo	VHL	40	3	2	5	14	—	—	—	—	—
RUS.2/VHL totals			389	37	64	101	308	18	2	1	3	49
IHL & RSL totals			275	11	18	29	214	14	0	0	0	10
KAZ totals			274	22	74	96	180	48	1	5	6	24

=== International ===
Year	Team	Event	GP	G	A	Pts	PIM
1993	Kazakhstan	AJC	4	0	6	6	2
1994	Kazakhstan	AJC	4	0	0	0	10
1999	Kazakhstan	WC B	7	0	1	1	12
2003	Kazakhstan	WC D1	5	0	1	1	0
2004	Kazakhstan	WC	6	1	1	2	2
2005	Kazakhstan	OGQ	3	0	0	0	0
2005	Kazakhstan	WC	6	0	0	0	0
2006	Kazakhstan	OG	5	0	0	0	8
2006	Kazakhstan	WC	6	1	1	2	2
2008	Kazakhstan	WC D1	5	0	1	1	6
2009	Kazakhstan	OGQ	6	0	2	2	2
Junior totals			8	0	6	6	12
Senior totals			49	2	7	9	32
