= Sergei Alexandrov (ice hockey) =

Kazakhstani ice hockey forward

- Born: April 29, 1978 (age 48) Tashkent, Uzbek SSR, Soviet Union
- Height: 5 ft 11 in (180 cm)
- Weight: 185 lb (84 kg; 13 st 3 lb)
- Position: Left wing
- Shot: Right
- VHL team Former teams: Kazzinc-Torpedo; Buran Voronezh
- National team: Kazakhstan
- Playing career: 1994–2013

Sergei Alexandrov
Medal record

Men's ice hockey

Representing Kazakhstan

Asian Games
Gold medal – first place	1999 Gangwon	Ice hockey
Silver medal – second place	2003 Aomori	Ice hockey
Silver medal – second place	2007 Changchun	Ice hockey

Sergei Evgenievich Alexandrov (Russian: Серге́й Евгеньевич Александров, born April 29, 1978) is a Kazakhstani ice hockey forward who was a member of the Kazakhstan men's national ice hockey team at the 2006 Winter Olympics.

== Career statistics ==
=== Regular season and playoffs ===
			Regular season					Playoffs
Season	Team	League	GP	G	A	Pts	PIM	GP	G	A	Pts	PIM
1994–95	Torpedo–2 Ust–Kamenogorsk	RUS.2	8	2	1	3	0	—	—	—	—	—
1995–96	Torpedo–2 Ust–Kamenogorsk	RUS.2	35	5	1	6	6	—	—	—	—	—
1996–97	Torpedo Ust–Kamenogorsk	RUS.2	38	16	14	30	14	—	—	—	—	—
1996–97	Torpedo–2 Ust–Kamenogorsk	RUS.3	14	5	6	11	2	—	—	—	—	—
1997–98	Torpedo Ust–Kamenogorsk	RUS.2	28	9	6	15	14	—	—	—	—	—
1998–99	Torpedo–2 Ust–Kamenogorsk	RUS.3	3	1	2	3	2	—	—	—	—	—
1999–2000	Torpedo Ust–Kamenogorsk	RUS.3	35	33	22	55	36	—	—	—	—	—
1999–2000	Torpedo–2 Ust–Kamenogorsk	KAZ
2000–01	Kazzinc–Torpedo	RUS.3	53	32	35	67	24	—	—	—	—	—
2000–01	Torpedo–2 Ust–Kamenogorsk	KAZ
2001–02	Kazzinc–Torpedo	RUS.2	53	30	17	47	14	—	—	—	—	—
2002–03	Kazzinc–Torpedo	RUS.2	44	24	17	41	38	—	—	—	—	—
2003–04	Kazzinc–Torpedo	KAZ	15	12	8	20	2	—	—	—	—	—
2003–04	Kazzinc–Torpedo	RUS.2	46	18	14	32	18	—	—	—	—	—
2004–05	Kazzinc–Torpedo	KAZ	21	3	10	13	8	—	—	—	—	—
2004–05	Kazzinc–Torpedo	RUS.2	39	11	10	21	43	—	—	—	—	—
2005–06	Kazzinc–Torpedo	KAZ	19	9	6	15	20	—	—	—	—	—
2005–06	Kazzinc–Torpedo	RUS.2	37	12	5	17	8	—	—	—	—	—
2006–07	Kazzinc–Torpedo	KAZ	18	11	9	20	2	—	—	—	—	—
2006–07	Kazzinc–Torpedo	RUS.2	51	14	16	30	28	—	—	—	—	—
2007–08	Kazzinc–Torpedo	RUS.2	46	12	14	26	42	6	3	2	5	4
2008–09	Kazzinc–Torpedo	RUS.2	49	19	26	45	12	4	0	1	1	8
2009–10	Kazzinc–Torpedo	RUS.2	42	14	14	28	6	7	3	2	5	0
2009–10	Torpedo–2 Ust–Kamenogorsk	KAZ	10	5	8	13	14	—	—	—	—	—
2010–11	Kazzinc–Torpedo	VHL	49	16	13	29	22	3	0	0	0	0
2011–12	Buran Voronezh	VHL	52	21	19	40	35	10	3	6	9	6
2012–13	Kazzinc–Torpedo	VHL	24	4	4	8	6	—	—	—	—	—
2012–13	Torpedo–2 Ust–Kamenogorsk	KAZ	5	1	4	5	10	—	—	—	—	—
RUS.2/VHL totals			607	217	177	394	283	20	6	5	11	12
RUS.3 totals			165	97	87	184	99	—	—	—	—	—
KAZ totals			88	41	40	81	56	—	—	—	—	—

=== International ===
Year	Team	Event	GP	G	A	Pts	PIM
1995	Kazakhstan	WJC C2	5	2	1	3	2
1995	Kazakhstan	AJC	3	2	1	3	0
1996	Kazakhstan	WJC C	4	5	1	6	0
1997	Kazakhstan	WJC B	7	4	2	6	2
1998	Kazakhstan	WJC	7	4	2	6	2
1999	Kazakhstan	WC B	7	0	1	1	0
1999	Kazakhstan	WC Q	3	0	0	0	0
2000	Kazakhstan	WC B	7	2	1	3	0
2001	Kazakhstan	WC D1	5	2	3	5	4
2002	Kazakhstan	WC D1	5	5	2	7	2
2004	Kazakhstan	WC	6	2	0	2	4
2005	Kazakhstan	OGQ	3	0	0	0	2
2005	Kazakhstan	WC	6	0	0	0	0
2006	Kazakhstan	OG	5	1	0	1	2
2009	Kazakhstan	OGQ	6	2	3	5	2
2009	Kazakhstan	WC D1	5	0	3	3	2
Junior totals			26	17	7	24	6
Senior totals			58	14	13	27	18
