= Alexander Koreshkov (ice hockey) =

Kazakhstani ice hockey player

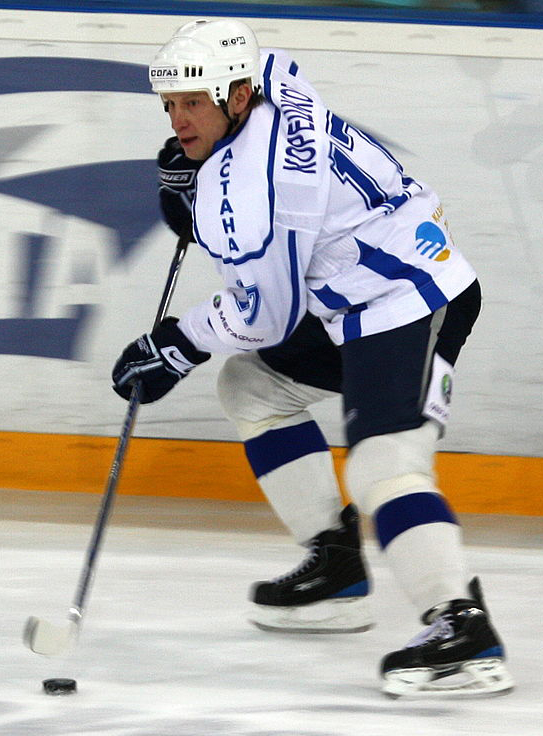
- Koreshkov with Barys Astana in 2009.
- Born: 28 October 1968 (age 57) Ust-Kamenogorsk, Kazakh SSR, Soviet Union
- Height: 5 ft 11 in (180 cm)
- Weight: 185 lb (84 kg; 13 st 3 lb)
- Position: Left wing
- Shot: Left
- Played for: Kazzinc-Torpedo; Metallurg Magnitogorsk; Sibir Novosibirsk; Severstal Cherepovets; Mechel Chelyabinsk; Barys Astana
- National team: Kazakhstan
- NHL draft: Undrafted
- Playing career: 1984–2010
Medal record
Representing Kazakhstan
Men's ice hockey
Asian Games
Silver medal – second place	2007 Changchun	Ice hockey

Alexander Gennadievich Koreshkov (Russian: Александр Геннадьевич Корешков; born 28 October 1968) is a retired Kazakhstani professional ice hockey left winger who last competed at the 2010 IIHF World Championship as a member of the Kazakhstan men's national ice hockey team. He is the older brother of former ice hockey player and current coach Evgeni Koreshkov. He is currently president of the Kontinental Hockey League team Barys Astana and a general manager of the Kazakhstan men's national ice hockey team. He competed at the 1998 Winter Olympics and the 2006 Winter Olympics.

== Career statistics ==
=== Regular season and playoffs ===
			Regular season					Playoffs
Season	Team	League	GP	G	A	Pts	PIM	GP	G	A	Pts	PIM
1984–85	Torpedo Ust–Kamenogorsk	URS.2	2	1	0	1	0	—	—	—	—	—
1985–86	Torpedo Ust–Kamenogorsk	URS.2	24	2	1	3	0	—	—	—	—	—
1986–87	Torpedo Ust–Kamenogorsk	URS.2	29	10	6	16	4	—	—	—	—	—
1987–88	SKA Sverdlovsk	URS.2	63	20	12	32	12	—	—	—	—	—
1988–89	SKA Sverdlovsk	URS.2	66	35	22	57	18	—	—	—	—	—
1989–90	Torpedo Ust–Kamenogorsk	URS	27	5	3	8	4	—	—	—	—	—
1990–91	Torpedo Ust–Kamenogorsk	URS	39	13	3	16	8	—	—	—	—	—
1991–92	Torpedo Ust–Kamenogorsk	CIS	36	9	13	22	6	6	2	0	2	5
1992–93	Torpedo Ust–Kamenogorsk	IHL	17	4	1	5	2	1	0	1	1	0
1992–93	Torpedo–2 Ust–Kamenogorsk	RUS.2	2	1	2	3	0	—	—	—	—	—
1993–94	Torpedo Ust–Kamenogorsk	IHL	33	11	9	20	4	—	—	—	—	—
1994–95	Metallurg Magnitogorsk	IHL	44	22	23	45	12	3	2	1	3	2
1995–96	Metallurg Magnitogorsk	IHL	47	8	16	24	8	10	3	4	7	10
1996–97	Metallurg Magnitogorsk	RSL	43	7	20	27	6	11	4	5	9	2
1997–98	Metallurg Magnitogorsk	RSL	46	18	21	39	4	—	—	—	—	—
1998–99	Metallurg Magnitogorsk	RSL	42	23	17	40	6	16	8	4	12	4
1999–2000	Metallurg Magnitogorsk	RSL	36	8	18	26	10	12	6	6	12	4
2000–01	Metallurg Magnitogorsk	RSL	44	17	17	34	10	12	5	8	13	2
2001–02	Metallurg Magnitogorsk	RSL	48	18	24	42	8	2	0	0	0	0
2002–03	Metallurg Magnitogorsk	RSL	50	14	12	26	10	3	0	1	1	0
2003–04	Metallurg Magnitogorsk	RSL	57	11	17	28	6	13	2	3	5	2
2004–05	Sibir Novosibirsk	RSL	31	5	4	9	6	—	—	—	—	—
2004–05	Severstal Cherepovets	RSL	10	1	4	5	2	—	—	—	—	—
2004–05	Mechel Chelyabinsk	RUS.2	6	2	3	5	2	8	3	2	5	4
2004–05	Mechel–2 Chelyabinsk	RUS.3	2	3	1	4	0	—	—	—	—	—
2005–06	Kazzinc–Torpedo	KAZ	17	6	8	14	8	—	—	—	—	—
2005–06	Kazzinc–Torpedo	RUS.2	36	10	32	42	16	—	—	—	—	—
2006–07	Kazzinc–Torpedo	KAZ	15	4	15	19	2	—	—	—	—	—
2006–07	Kazzinc–Torpedo	RUS.2	48	15	31	46	14	—	—	—	—	—
2007–08	Kazzinc–Torpedo	RUS.2	15	0	7	7	8	—	—	—	—	—
2007–08	Barys Astana	RUS.2	34	10	26	36	12	6	1	2	3	0
2008–09	Barys Astana	KHL	43	4	9	13	14	2	0	0	0	0
2009–10	Barys Astana	KHL	48	7	8	15	18	3	0	0	0	0
URS/CIS totals			102	27	19	46	18	6	2	0	2	5
IHL totals			141	45	49	94	26	14	5	6	11	12
RSL totals			407	122	154	276	68	69	25	27	52	14

=== International ===
Year	Team	Event	GP	G	A	Pts	PIM
1993	Kazakhstan	WC C	7	10	4	14	2
1998	Kazakhstan	OG	7	3	6	9	2
1998	Kazakhstan	WC	3	1	0	1	0
1999	Kazakhstan	WC Q	2	0	0	0	2
2003	Kazakhstan	WC D1	4	5	5	10	9
2004	Kazakhstan	WC	6	0	4	4	2
2005	Kazakhstan	OGQ	3	0	0	0	2
2005	Kazakhstan	WC	6	0	1	1	6
2006	Kazakhstan	OG	5	1	2	3	0
2006	Kazakhstan	WC	6	0	2	2	2
2007	Kazakhstan	WC D1	5	3	1	4	0
2009	Kazakhstan	OGQ	3	0	1	1	0
2009	Kazakhstan	WC D1	5	1	3	4	0
2010	Kazakhstan	WC	6	0	1	1	0
Senior totals			68	18	36	54	27

Olympic Games
Preceded by Askhat Zhitkeyev	Flagbearer for Kazakhstan; Turin 2006	Succeeded by Bakhyt Akhmetov
