= Igor Radulov =

Russian former ice hockey player (born 1982)

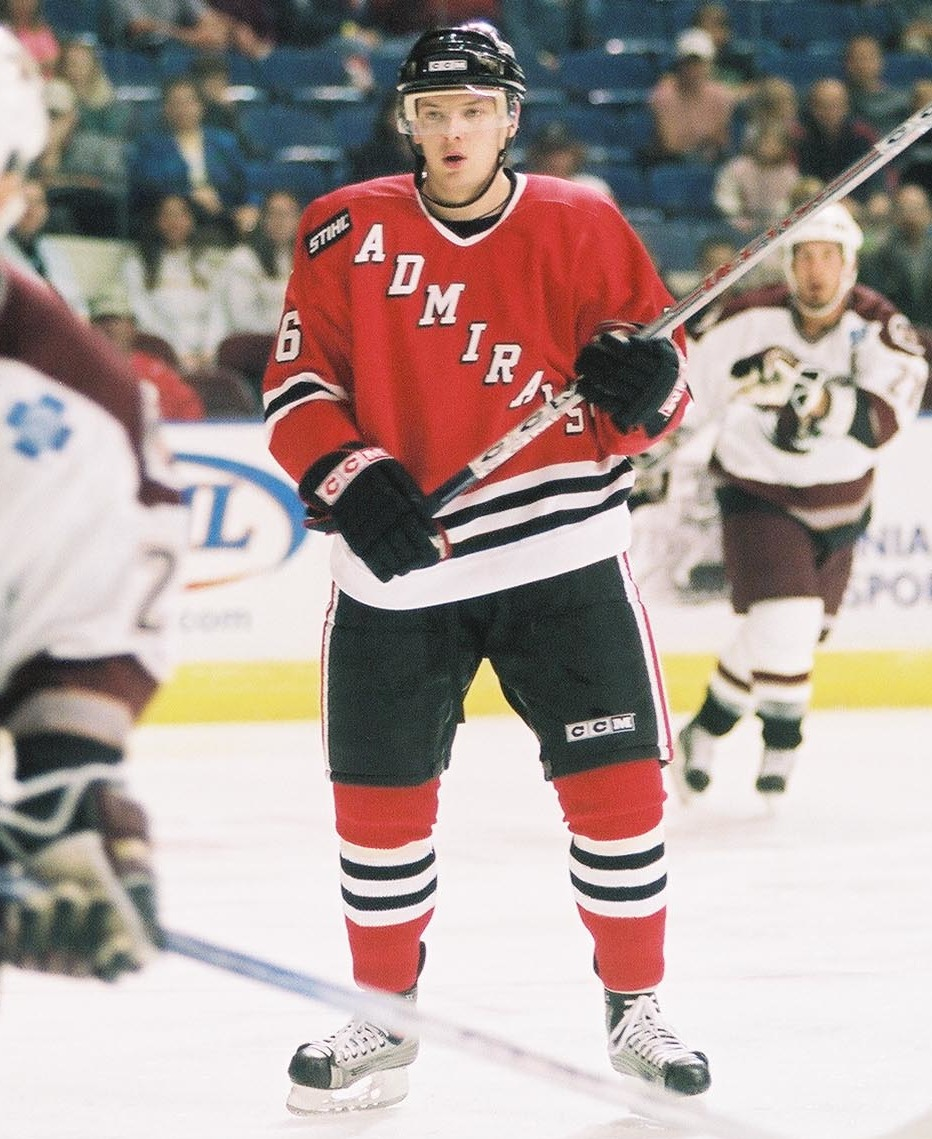
- Radulov with the Norfolk Admirals in 2005
- Born: August 23, 1982 (age 43) Nizhny Tagil, Soviet Union
- Height: 6 ft 1 in (185 cm)
- Weight: 195 lb (88 kg; 13 st 13 lb)
- Position: Left wing
- Shot: Left
- Played for: Torpedo Yaroslavl; Lokomotiv Yaroslavl; Chicago Blackhawks; HC Spartak Moscow; Metallurg Novokuznetsk; HC Vityaz; Salavat Yulaev Ufa; Metallurg Magnitogorsk; Severstal Cherepovets; HC CSKA Moscow; Atlant Moscow Oblast; HC Sochi; HC Ugra
- NHL draft: 74th overall, 2000; Chicago Blackhawks
- Playing career: 1998–2017

Igor Valerievich Radulov (Russian: Игорь Валерьевич Радулов; born August 23, 1982) is a Russian former professional ice hockey player.

He was drafted by the National Hockey League's Chicago Blackhawks 74th overall in the 2000 NHL entry draft and played 43 regular season games for the Blackhawks, scoring 9 goals and 7 assists for 16 points. After the NHL lockout, Radulov returned to Russia with HC Spartak Moscow. In 2006, he had short stints with Metallurg Novokuznezk of the Russian Superleague and with HC Dmitrov of the Vysshaya Liga before signing with the Superleague's Vityaz Chekhov. During the 2008-09 KHL season, Radulov signed with Salavat Yulaev Ufa.

== Personal life ==
He is the older brother of Alexander Radulov who plays in the Kontinental Hockey League (KHL) for Ak Bars Kazan.

== Career statistics ==
=== Regular season and playoffs ===
			Regular season					Playoffs
Season	Team	League	GP	G	A	Pts	PIM	GP	G	A	Pts	PIM
1998–99	Torpedo–2 Yaroslavl	RUS-2	21	2	3	5	4	—	—	—	—	—
1999–00	Torpedo–2 Yaroslavl	RUS-3	31	17	6	23	30	—	—	—	—	—
2000–01	Lokomotiv–2 Yaroslavl	RUS-3	13	7	7	14	20	—	—	—	—	—
2000–01	Kristall Saratov	RUS-2	4	0	2	2	2	—	—	—	—	—
2000–01	Kristall–2 Saratov	RUS-3	10	5	2	7	6	—	—	—	—	—
2000–01	SKA St. Petersburg	RSL	9	1	0	1	6	—	—	—	—	—
2001–02	Mississauga IceDogs	OHL	62	33	30	63	30	—	—	—	—	—
2002–03	Chicago Blackhawks	NHL	7	5	0	5	4	—	—	—	—	—
2002–03	Norfolk Admirals	AHL	62	18	9	27	26	9	2	2	4	8
2003–04	Chicago Blackhawks	NHL	36	4	7	11	18	—	—	—	—	—
2003–04	Norfolk Admirals	AHL	38	9	14	23	26	8	0	1	1	4
2004–05	Norfolk Admirals	AHL	16	0	0	0	16	—	—	—	—	—
2004–05	Spartak Moscow	RSL	25	2	2	4	22	—	—	—	—	—
2004–05	Spartak–2 Moscow	RUS-3	2	2	1	3	14	—	—	—	—	—
2005–06	Spartak Moscow	RSL	42	4	6	10	54	3	0	0	0	4
2006–07	Metallurg Novokuznetsk	RSL	13	1	3	4	12	—	—	—	—	—
2006–07	Metallurg–2 Novokuznetsk	RUS-3	1	0	0	0	0	—	—	—	—	—
2006–07	HC Dmitrov	RUS-2	9	2	0	2	10	—	—	—	—	—
2006–07	HC Vityaz	RSL	23	6	4	10	49	3	1	0	1	25
2007–08	HC Vityaz	RSL	50	11	13	24	75	—	—	—	—	—
2008–09	HC Vityaz	KHL	38	16	6	22	111	—	—	—	—	—
2008–09	Salavat Yulaev Ufa	KHL	14	6	0	6	18	4	0	1	1	4
2009–10	Metallurg Magnitogorsk	KHL	43	11	6	17	50	3	0	0	0	0
2010–11	Severstal Cherepovets	KHL	21	1	1	2	14	—	—	—	—	—
2010–11	HC Vityaz	KHL	8	0	2	2	4	—	—	—	—	—
2011–12	Salavat Yulaev Ufa	KHL	35	4	5	9	16	1	0	0	0	2
2012–13	CSKA Moscow	KHL	47	17	12	29	91	9	2	3	5	6
2013–14	Atlant Moscow Oblast	KHL	45	15	6	21	32	—	—	—	—	—
2014–15	Atlant Moscow Oblast	KHL	28	4	5	9	47	—	—	—	—	—
2014–15	HC Sochi	KHL	15	3	3	6	8	4	0	1	1	0
2015–16	Spartak Moscow	KHL	29	5	2	7	30	—	—	—	—	—
2016–17	HC Yugra	KHL	18	0	2	2	8	—	—	—	—	—
2016–17	Severstal Cherepovets	KHL	4	0	0	0	14	—	—	—	—	—
RSL totals			162	25	28	53	218	6	1	0	1	29
KHL totals			345	82	50	132	443	21	2	5	7	12
NHL totals			43	9	7	16	22	—	—	—	—	—
