= Masahito Haruna =

Japanese ice hockey player and coach

- Born: 16 July 1973 (age 53) Kushiro, Hokkaidō, Japan
- Height: 184 cm (6 ft 0 in)
- Weight: 78 kg (172 lb; 12 st 4 lb)
- Position: Goaltender
- Caught: Right
- Played for: Furukawa Electric; Nikkō Ice Bucks; Quad City Mallards; Oji Eagles
- National team: Japan
- Playing career: 1997–2016

Japanese name
- Kanji: 春名真仁
- Kana: はるな まさひと
Medal record
Men's ice hockey
Representing Japan
Asian Games
Gold medal – first place	2003 Aomori	Ice hockey
Gold medal – first place	2007 Changchun	Ice hockey
Silver medal – second place	1999 Kangwon	Ice hockey
Silver medal – second place	2011 Astana-Almaty	Ice hockey

Masahito Haruna (春名真仁, Haruna Masahito; born 16 July 1973) is a Japanese former professional ice hockey goaltender and current assistant coach of the women's, women's under-18, and men's national ice hockey teams of Japan.

== Playing career ==
As a child, Haruna played as a goalie for ice hockey and football teams, though he was ultimately more interested in hockey. After graduating from Kushiro Koryo High School, he attended Waseda University and played on the school's ice hockey team.

Haruna played in the Japan Ice Hockey League (JIHL) with the Furukawa Electric during 1996 to 1999, and with the Nikkō Ice Bucks during 1999 to 2002. He played with the Quad City Mallards of the United Hockey League (UHL) in the 2003–04 season, the only season in his twenty-year career played with a non-Japanese team. Returning to Japan before the 2004–05 season, he re-signed with the Ice Bucks, which had transitioned to the Asia League Ice Hockey in 2003. Haruna remained with the Nikkō Ice Bucks through the 2005–06 season and then signed with the Oji Eagles, also of the Asia League. He played with the Oji Eagles during 2007 to 2015, serving as player-coach in the 2014–15 season. He then spent one final season back with the Nikkō Ice Bucks before retiring in 2016.

=== International play ===
Haruna represented Japan at many international competitions during his playing career, including at a number of IIHF World Championships and World Championship qualification tournaments, most notably at the 2003 Top Division tournament; at the Olympic qualification tournaments in 2005, 2009, and 2012; and at four Asian Winter Games, winning gold in 2003 and 2007 and silver in 1999 and 2011. In total, his playing career with the Japan men's national team spanned seventeen seasons, from 1996–97 to 2012–13.

== Coaching career ==
Haruna began coaching with teams of the Japan Ice Hockey Federation immediately following his retirement from playing in 2016. He served as the goaltending coach (often recorded as assistant coach) to the women's national team at the qualification tournament for the 2018 Winter Olympics, the 2017 Asian Winter Games, the 2017 IIHF World Championship Division IA, the 2018 Winter Olympics, the 2019 IIHF World Championship, and the 2021 IIHF World Championship; to the men's national team at the qualification tournament for the 2018 Winter Olympics, the 2018 IIHF World Championship Division IB, the 2019 IIHF World Championship Division IB, and the pre-qualification tournament for the 2022 Winter Olympics; and to the women's national under-18 team at the 2018 IIHF World U18 Championship Division IA and the 2019 IIHF World U18 Championship, in addition to coaching the three teams at various international friendly matches and tournaments.
