= Sergei Klimovich =

Russian ice hockey player

- Born: March 8, 1974 (age 51) Novosibirsk, Soviet Union
- Height: 6 ft 2 in (188 cm)
- Weight: 189 lb (86 kg; 13 st 7 lb)
- Position: Centre
- Shot: Right
- Played for: Donbass Donetsk; Metallurg Novokuznetsk; Spartak Moscow; Sibir Novosibirsk; Metallurg Magnitogorsk; Dynamo Moscow; Augsburg Panthers; EC Graz; Chicago Blackhawks
- National team: Russia
- NHL draft: 41st overall, 1992; Chicago Blackhawks
- Playing career: 1992–2007

Sergei Nikolaevich Klimovich (Russian: Сергей Николаевич Климович; born March 8, 1974) is a Russian retired professional ice hockey center who played in one National Hockey League game for the Chicago Blackhawks during the 1996–97 season. In his sole NHL appearance against the Toronto Maple Leafs, on December 9, 1996, he failed to register a point and received two penalty minutes. The rest of his career, which lasted from 1991 to 2011, was mainly spent in the Russian Superleague. Internationally Klimovich played for the Russian national team at the 1993 World Junior Championships.

== Career statistics ==
=== Regular season and playoffs ===
			Regular season					Playoffs
Season	Team	League	GP	G	A	Pts	PIM	GP	G	A	Pts	PIM
1990–91	Dynamo Moscow-3	USSR-3	3	1	0	1	0	—	—	—	—	—
1991–92	Dynamo Moscow	USSR	3	0	0	0	0	—	—	—	—	—
1991–92	Dynamo Moscow-3	USSR-3	39	14	9	23	20	—	—	—	—	—
1992–93	Dynamo Moscow	RUS	30	4	1	5	14	10	1	0	1	2
1992–93	Dynamo Moscow-2	RUS-2	1	0	1	1	0	—	—	—	—	—
1993–94	Dynamo Moscow	RUS	39	7	4	11	14	12	2	3	5	6
1993–94	Dynamo Moscow-3	RUS-3	4	1	2	3	4	—	—	—	—	—
1994–95	Dynamo Moscow	RUS	4	1	0	1	2	—	—	—	—	—
1994–95	Indianapolis Ice	IHL	71	14	30	44	20	—	—	—	—	—
1995–96	Indianapolis Ice	IHL	68	17	21	38	28	5	1	1	2	6
1996–97	Chicago Black Hawks	NHL	1	0	0	0	2	—	—	—	—	—
1996–97	Indianapolis Ice	IHL	75	20	37	57	98	3	1	2	3	0
1997–98	Las Vegas Thunder	IHL	25	2	8	10	6	—	—	—	—	—
1997–98	Quebec Rafales	IHL	21	1	7	8	8	—	—	—	—	—
1997–98	Idaho Steelheads	WCHL	13	5	9	14	18	1	0	0	0	0
1998–99	EC Graz	ALP	13	13	7	20	23	—	—	—	—	—
1998–99	Augsburg Panthers	DEL	31	7	8	15	30	5	2	0	2	6
1999–00	Augsburg Panthers	DEL	47	5	14	19	91	3	0	0	0	2
2000–01	Dynamo Moscow	RSL	30	4	9	13	20	—	—	—	—	—
2001–02	Metallurg Magnitogorsk	RUS	13	1	3	4	4	—	—	—	—	—
2001–02	Sibir Novosibirsk	RUS-2	33	17	32	49	46	14	8	6	14	20
2002–03	Sibir Novosibirsk	RUS	48	9	16	25	104	—	—	—	—	—
2003–04	Sibir Novosibirsk	RUS	40	5	8	13	46	—	—	—	—	—
2003–04	Sibir Novosibirsk-2	RUS-2	2	2	1	3	4	—	—	—	—	—
2004–05	Sibir Novosibirsk	RUS	55	4	6	10	30	—	—	—	—	—
2005–06	Spartak Moscow	RUS	42	4	8	12	46	3	0	0	0	2
2006–07	Metallurg Novokuznetsk	RUS	32	4	11	15	22	3	1	0	1	2
2006–07	Metallurg Novokuznetsk-2	RUS-2	1	0	1	1	0	—	—	—	—	—
2009–10	HC Belgorod	RUS-3	36	9	38	47	42	7	1	4	5	31
2010–11	HC Belgorod	RUS-3	21	4	18	22	40	—	—	—	—	—
2010–11	Donbass Donetsk	UKR	4	5	5	10	0	—	—	—	—	—
RSL totals			333	43	66	109	302	28	4	3	7	12
NHL totals			1	0	0	0	2	—	—	—	—	—

=== International ===
Year	Team	Event	GP	G	A	Pts	PIM
1992	Russia	EJC	6	3	3	6	2
1993	Russia	WJC	7	2	2	4	10
Junior totals			13	5	5	10	12

== See also ==
- List of players who played only one game in the NHL
