= Ice hockey at the 2003 Asian Winter Games – Men's tournament =

Men at the 2003 Asian Winter Games
- Venue: Niida Indoor Rink
- Date: 2–7 February 2003
- Nations: 6

Medalists
gold medal	Japan
silver medal	Kazakhstan
bronze medal	China

The men's tournament of Ice hockey at the 2003 Asian Winter Games at Hachinohe, Japan, was held from 2 February to 7 February 2003.

== Results ==
All times are Japan Standard Time (UTC+09:00)

=== Preliminary round ===
==== Group A ====
Pos	Team	Pld	W	D	L	GF	GA	GD	Pts	Qualification
1	Kazakhstan	2	2	0	0	36	2	+34	4	Semifinals
2	South Korea	2	1	0	1	24	12	+12	2	Semifinals
3	Mongolia	2	0	0	2	2	48	−46	0	5th/6th match

Source: Official website

2 February; 14:00	Mongolia	1–25 (0–16, 0–6, 1–3)	Kazakhstan	Niida Indoor Rink, Hachinohe

3 February; 14:00	South Korea	23–1 (9–0, 8–0, 6–1)	Mongolia	Niida Indoor Rink, Hachinohe

4 February; 14:00	Kazakhstan	11–1 (8–1, 2–0, 1–0)	South Korea	Niida Indoor Rink, Hachinohe

==== Group B ====
Pos	Team	Pld	W	D	L	GF	GA	GD	Pts	Qualification
1	Japan	2	2	0	0	54	0	+54	4	Semifinals
2	China	2	1	0	1	24	17	+7	2	Semifinals
3	Thailand	2	0	0	2	2	63	−61	0	5th/6th match

Source: Official website

2 February; 18:00	Thailand	0–39 (0–15, 0–16, 0–8)	Japan	Niida Indoor Rink, Hachinohe

3 February; 18:00	China	24–2 (7–0, 9–1, 8–1)	Thailand	Niida Indoor Rink, Hachinohe

4 February; 18:00	Japan	15–0 (5–0, 6–0, 4–0)	China	Niida Indoor Rink, Hachinohe

=== 5th/6th match ===
6 February; 11:00	Mongolia	2–4 (1–1, 0–1, 1–2)	Thailand	Niida Indoor Rink, Hachinohe

=== Final round ===
Semifinals
6 February
Kazakhstan	12
China	1
6 February
Japan	11
South Korea	2

Final
7 February
Kazakhstan	2
Japan	7
3rd/4th match
7 February
China	6
South Korea	2

==== Semifinals ====
6 February; 14:30	Kazakhstan	12–1 (3–1, 2–0, 7–0)	China	Niida Indoor Rink, Hachinohe

6 February; 18:00	Japan	11–2 (5–0, 3–0, 3–2)	South Korea	Niida Indoor Rink, Hachinohe

==== 3rd/4th match ====
7 February; 13:00	China	6–2 (1–0, 2–2, 3–0)	South Korea	Niida Indoor Rink, Hachinohe

==== Final ====
7 February; 17:00	Kazakhstan	2–7 (1–3, 1–1, 0–3)	Japan	Niida Indoor Rink, Hachinohe

== Final standing ==
Rank	Team	Pld	W	D	L
1st place, gold medalist(s)	Japan	4	4	0	0
2nd place, silver medalist(s)	Kazakhstan	4	3	0	1
3rd place, bronze medalist(s)	China	4	2	0	2
4	South Korea	4	1	0	3
5	Thailand	3	1	0	2
6	Mongolia	3	0	0	3
