= Sergei Ogureshnikov =

Kazakhstani ice hockey player (born 1977)

- Born: April 4, 1977 (age 47); Oskemen, Kazakhstan
- Position: Goaltender
- QHF team: Kazakhstan

Sergey Ogureshnikov (born April 4, 1977) is a Kazakhstani ice hockey goaltender currently playing for Kazzinc-Torpedo. He was a member of the Kazakhstan men's national ice hockey team at the 2001 and 2005 World Ice Hockey Championships.
