= Oleg Yeremeyev =

Kazakhstani ice hockey player

- Born: June 11, 1977 (age 47); Ust-Kamenogorsk, Kazakh SSR, Soviet Union
- Height: 5 ft 11 in (180 cm)
- Weight: 165 lb (75 kg; 11 st 11 lb)
- Position: Left wing
- Shot: Right
- Played for: Traktor Chelyabinsk; HC Lada Togliatti; Krylya Sovetov Moscow; CSK VVS Samara; SKA Saint Petersburg; Salavat Yulaev Ufa
- National team: Kazakhstan
- Playing career: 1996–2014

Oleg Yeremeyev (born June 11, 1979) is a Kazakhstani former professional ice hockey left winger.

Yeremeyev played in the Russian Superleague for Traktor Chelyabinsk, HC Lada Togliatti, Krylya Sovetov Moscow, CSK VVS Samara, SKA Saint Petersburg and Salavat Yulaev Ufa between 1997 and 2001. He also played for the Kazakhstan men's national ice hockey team in the 2002 World Championship Division 1.
