= Oh Hyon-ho =

South Korean ice hockey player

- Born: 29 October 1986 (age 38); Seoul, South Korea
- Height: 175 cm (5 ft 9 in)
- Weight: 77 kg (170 lb; 12 st 2 lb)
- Position: Defenceman
- Shoots: Right
- ALIH team Former teams: Daemyung Killer Whales; High1
- National team: South Korea
- Playing career: 2009–present

Oh Hyon-ho (born 29 October 1986) is a South Korean ice hockey player. He competed in the 2018 Winter Olympics.
