= Niida Indoor Rink =

Arena in Hachinohe, Aomori, Japan

Coordinates: 40.500008°N 141.516905°E

Technol Ice Park Hachinohe
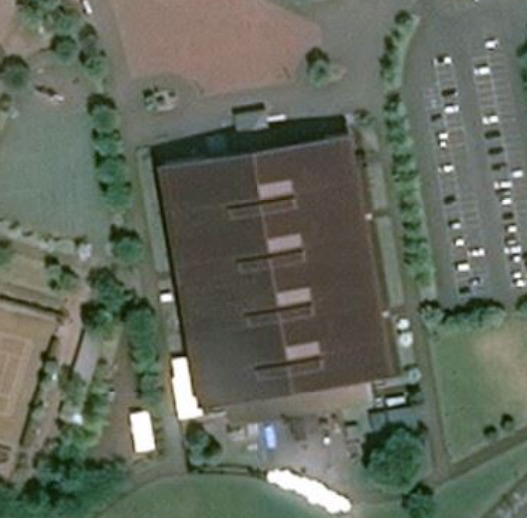
- Interactive map of Technol Ice Park Hachinohe
- Location: Hachinohe, Aomori, Japan
- Owner: Hachinohe City
- Capacity: 1,576

Construction
- Opened: 1984

Tenant
- Tohoku Free Blades

The Niida Indoor Rink, officially Technol Ice Park Hachinohe (テクノルアイスパーク八戸) is an arena in the city of Hachinohe, Aomori, Japan. It is used for ice hockey and figure skating; and is the home arena of Tohoku Free Blades of the Asia League Ice Hockey.

It was opened in 1984 and holds 1,576 seats.

It is located within the Niida Park in Hachinohe.
