= Kapitan Stupino =

Russian ice hockey team

- City: Stupino, Russia
- Founded: 1999
- Home arena: Bobrova Ice Palace
- Colours: White, Blue, Red

Hockey Club "Kapitan" is an ice hockey club based in Stupino, Moscow Oblast. The club was founded on 25 January 1999. Founder and director - Boris Lotenkov.

== History ==
The club competed in regional hockey competitions in Stupino District and Moscow Oblast before entering the Russian First League. In the 2001–02 season, Kapitan won the Centre Region championship of the Russian First League.

In 2004, the Vsevolod Bobrov Ice Sports Palace was opened in Stupino and became the club's home arena. Since 2005, the arena has also served as the base for the club's Olympic reserve sports school.

From 2005 to 2009, Kapitan competed in the Higher Hockey League.

Since 2011, Kapitan has competed in the Junior Hockey League (MHL). From 2017 to 2023, the club served as the MHL affiliate of HC Sochi.

In the 2024–25 season, Kapitan was represented by its junior team, which competed in the Central Federal District Championship and the Moscow Oblast Championship.
