= HC Belgorod =

- City: Belgorod, Russia
- League: Junior Hockey League Division B
- Founded: 1994
- Home arena: Oranzevjy led
- Colours: Blue, White

HC Belgorod is an ice hockey team in Belgorod, Russia. They play in the Junior Hockey League Division B, the second level of junior ice hockey in Russia. The club was founded in 1994.
