= MHC Dmitrov =

HC Dmitrov
- City: Dmitrov, Moscow
- Founded: 2003
- Home arena: Dmitrov Sport Palace (capacity: 1500)
- Colours: Blue, White

Franchise history
- HC Dmitrov 2003-Present

HC Dmitrov (Russian: ХК Дмитров) is an ice hockey team based in Dmitrov, Moscow Oblast, Russia. The team first played during the 2012–13 season of MHL-B.
