= 2007 IIHF World Championship Division I =

Tournament details
- Host countries: China; Slovenia
- Venue(s): Qiqihar Icerink, Tivoli Hall
- Dates: April 15 – April 21
- Teams: 12 (two groups of 6)

Tournament statistics
- Games played: 30
- Attendance: 51,436 (1,715 per game)

The following teams took part in the Division I tournament, held from April 15, 2007 through April 21, 2007. Group A was played in Qiqihar, China. Group B was played in Ljubljana, Slovenia.

== Group A ==
=== Standings ===
Team	Pld	W	OTW	OTL	L	GF	GA	GD	Pts	FRA	POL	KAZ	EST	NED	CHN
France	5	4	0	1	0	24	7	+17	13		4–0	3–1	3–4^{(OT)}	4–2	10–0
Poland	5	2	2	0	1	22	13	+9	10	0–4		5–2	4–3^{(OT)}	4–3^{(OT)}	9–1
Kazakhstan	5	3	0	0	2	22	11	+11	9	1–3	2–5		2–1	5–2	12–0
Estonia	5	1	1	2	1	16	17	−1	7	4–3^{(OT)}	3–4^{(OT)}	1–2		3–4^{(OT)}	5–4
Netherlands	5	1	1	1	2	20	19	+1	6	2–4	3–4^{(OT)}	2–5	4–3^{(OT)}		9–3
China	5	0	0	0	5	8	45	−37	0	0–10	1–9	0–12	4–5	3–9	

- France is promoted to Main Championship.
- China is demoted to Division II.

=== Scoring leaders ===
Player	Country	GP	G	A	Pts	PIM
Bradley Smulders	Netherlands	5	6	5	11	0
Leszek Laszkiewicz	Poland	5	5	3	8	2
Jacek Plachta	Poland	5	5	3	8	14
Laurent Meunier	France	5	3	5	8	8
Andrei Makrov	Estonia	5	6	1	7	2

== Group B ==
=== Standings ===
Team	Pld	W	OTW	OTL	L	GF	GA	GD	Pts	SLO	HUN	JPN	GBR	LTU	ROU
Slovenia	5	5	0	0	0	29	5	+24	15		4–1	7–1	4–0	4–2	10–1
Hungary	5	3	1	0	1	20	13	+7	11	1–4		4–3^{(OT)}	4–2	6–1	5–3
Japan	5	1	1	1	2	19	22	−3	6	1–7	3–4^{(OT)}		3–4	6–2	6–5^{(OT)}
Great Britain	5	2	0	0	3	14	15	−1	6	0–4	2–4	4–3		2–3	6–1
Lithuania	5	2	0	0	3	13	20	−7	6	2–4	1–6	2–6	3–2		5–2
Romania	5	0	0	1	4	12	32	−20	1	1–10	3–5	5–6^{(OT)}	1–6	2–5	

- Slovenia is promoted to Main Championship.
- Romania is demoted to Division II.

=== Scoring leaders ===
Player	Country	GP	G	A	Pts	PIM
Anže Kopitar	Slovenia	5	1	13	14	2
Tomaž Razingar	Slovenia	5	6	4	10	2
Balázs Ladányi	Hungary	5	5	4	9	0
Marcel Rodman	Slovenia	5	1	7	8	14
Levente Elekes	Romania	5	4	3	7	20
