= 2008–09 Vysshaya Liga season =

Russian ice hockey league season

The 2008–09 Vysshaya Liga season was the 17th season of the Vysshaya Liga, the second level of ice hockey in Russia. 33 teams participated in the league, and HC Yugra won the championship.

== First round ==
=== Western Conference ===
	Club	GP	W	OTW	OTL	L	GF	GA	Pts
1.	HC Dmitrov	66	48	5	4	9	271	123	158
2.	Sokol Kiev	66	45	8	1	12	239	134	152
3.	HC Rys Podolsk	66	34	8	5	19	220	190	123
4.	MHC Krylya Sovetov Moscow	66	33	6	11	16	184	159	122
5.	HC Ryazan	66	32	4	9	21	195	191	113
6.	Kapitan Stupino	66	33	3	6	24	214	153	111
7.	HC Lipetsk	66	21	8	3	34	189	223	82
8.	HC Belgorod	66	21	2	13	30	173	212	80
9.	PHC Krylya Sovetov Moscow	66	18	8	2	38	178	223	72
10.	HC VMF St. Petersburg	66	19	4	5	38	171	229	70
11.	Titan Klin	66	13	6	2	45	129	209	53
12.	Kristall Elektrostal	66	15	2	3	46	162	279	52

=== Central Conference ===
	Club	GP	W	OTW	OTL	L	GF	GA	Pts
1.	Izhstal Izhevsk	60	30	7	5	18	157	116	109
2.	Neftyanik Almetyevsk	60	30	4	11	15	192	165	109
3.	Molot-Prikamie Perm	60	30	5	5	20	176	161	105
4.	Yuzhny Ural Orsk	60	28	8	3	21	167	124	103
5.	Toros Neftekamsk	60	30	5	2	23	200	152	102
6.	Dizel Penza	60	29	4	7	20	178	160	102
7.	Kristall Saratov	60	28	6	4	22	162	144	100
8.	Ariada-Akpars Volzhsk	60	26	6	7	21	183	163	97
9.	Neftyanik Leninogorsk	60	22	6	3	29	145	159	81
10.	Gazprom-OGU Orenburg	60	16	3	7	34	141	195	61
11.	CSK VVS Samara	60	3	4	4	49	94	256	21

=== Eastern Conference ===
	Club	GP	W	OTW	OTL	L	GF	GA	Pts
1.	Avtomobilist Yekaterinburg	54	38	4	3	9	221	118	125
2.	HC Yugra	54	34	6	5	9	188	106	119
3.	HC Mechel Chelyabinsk	54	25	6	9	14	166	136	96
4.	Sputnik Nizhny Tagil	54	27	5	4	18	165	151	95
5.	Kazzinc-Torpedo	54	23	8	4	19	166	149	89
6.	Gazovik Tyumen	54	23	4	9	18	163	131	86
7.	Metallurg Serov	54	16	5	4	29	102	163	62
8.	Ermak Angarsk	54	14	8	3	29	116	170	61
9.	Saryarka Karaganda	54	10	3	3	38	119	202	39
10.	Zauralie Kurgan	54	9	2	7	36	108	188	38

== Playoffs ==
First round
C6	Dizel Penza	2
W6	Kapitan Stupino	3
C3	Molot-Prikamie Perm	3
E8	Ermak Angarsk	2
W5	HC Ryazan	3
W7	HC Lipetsk	1
C4	Yuzhny Ural Orsk	3
E7	Metallurg Serov	0
C5	Toros Neftekamsk	3
C7	Kristall Saratov	0
E4	Sputnik Nizhny Tagil	3
C8	Ariada-Akpars Volzhsk	1
E5	Kazzinc-Torpedo Ust-Kamenogorsk	1
E6	Gazovik Tjumen	3
W4	MHC Krylya Sovetov Moscow	3
W8	HC Belgorod	0

Second round
W1	HC Dmitrov	3
W6	Kapitan Stupino	1
E3	HC Mechel Chelyabinsk	3
C3	Molot-Prikamie Perm	1
W2	HC Sokol Kiev	3
W5	HC Ryazan	1
E2	HC Yugra	3
C4	Yuzhny Ural Orsk	1
C1	Izhstal Izhevsk	3
C5	Toros Neftekamsk	1
C2	Neftyanik Almetyevsk	3
E4	Sputnik Nizhny Tagil	2
E1	Avtomobilist Yekaterinburg	3
E6	Gazovik Tyumen	1
W3	HC Rys Podolsk	0
W4	MHC Krylya Sovetov Moscow	3

Quarterfinals
W1	HC Dmitrov	3
E3	HC Mechel Chelyabinsk	0
W2	HC Sokol Kiev	1
E2	HC Yugra	3
C1	Izhstal Izhevsk	2
C2	Neftyanik Almetyevsk	3
O1	Avtomobilist Yekaterinburg	0
W4	MHC Krylya Sovetov Moscow	3

Semifinals
W1	HC Dmitrov	2
E2	HC Yugra	3
C2	Neftyanik Almetyevsk	0
W4	MHC Krylya Sovetov Moscow	3

Final
E2	HC Yugra	3
W4	MHC Krylya Sovetov Moscow	0

=== 3rd place ===
- (C2) Neftyanik Almetyevsk – (W1) HC Dmitrov 4:1, 1:2, 0:1 OT
