= 2011–12 Kazakhstan Hockey Championship =

- League: Kazakhstan Hockey Championship
- Sport: Ice Hockey
- Teams: 10

Regular season
- Winners: Beibarys Atyrau

Playoffs

Finals
- Champions: Beibarys Atyrau
- Runners-up: Yertis Pavlodar

Kazakhstan Hockey Championship seasons
- ← 2010–11 2012–13 →

The 2011–12 Kazakhstan Hockey Championship was the 20th season of the Kazakhstan Hockey Championship, the top level of ice hockey in Kazakhstan. 10 teams participated in the league, and Beibarys Atyrau won the championship.

== Regular season ==
Team	GP	W	OTW	SOW	SOL	OTL	L	Goals	Pts
Beibarys Atyrau	54	40	0	3	1	1	9	220:71	128
Saryarka Karagandy	54	37	1	2	3	3	10	227:120	121
Yertis Pavlodar	54	33	1	4	1	1	14	195:81	111
Arystan Temirtau	54	31	2	3	4	0	14	213:141	107
HC Astana	54	24	1	5	7	1	16	165:143	92
Arlan Kokshetau	54	21	2	2	3	2	24	149:149	76
Gornyak Rudny	54	22	1	2	4	0	25	174:171	76
HC Almaty	54	16	2	5	4	0	27	149:175	66
Barys Astana-2	54	6	0	0	0	2	46	98:297	20
Kazzinc-Torpedo-2	54	3	0	1	0	2	48	93:344	13

== Playoffs ==
Quarterfinals
1	Beibarys Atyrau	3
8	HC Almaty	0
4	Arystan Temirtau	3
5	HC Astana	1
2	Saryarka Karaganda	3
7	Gornyak Rudny	0
3	Yertis Pavlodar	3
6	Arlan Kokshetau	0

Semifinals
1	Beibarys Atyrau	4
4	Arystan Temirtau	0
2	Saryarka Karaganda	2
3	Yertis Pavlodar	4

Final
1	Beibarys Atyrau	4
3	Yertis Pavlodar	2
