= 1998–99 Vysshaya Liga season =

Russian ice hockey league season

The 1998–99 Vysshaya Liga season was the seventh season of the Vysshaya Liga, the second level of ice hockey in Russia. Ten teams participated in the league. Torpedo Nizhny Novgorod finished first, and the top six teams earned the right to participate in the qualification round of the Russian Superleague. Kristall Elektrostal, Dinamo-Energija Yekaterinburg, and Torpedo Nizhny Novgorod were promoted to the Superleague.

== Standings ==
	Club	GP	W	T	L	GF	Ga	Pts
1.	Torpedo Nizhny Novgorod	36	26	3	7	135	62	55
2.	Kristall Elektrostal	36	24	3	9	137	87	51
3.	Sibir Novosibirsk	36	21	4	11	108	86	46
4.	Neftyanik Almetyevsk	36	20	4	12	136	88	44
5.	HC CSKA Moscow	36	19	3	14	153	87	41
6.	Dinamo-Energija Yekaterinburg	36	20	1	15	164	115	41
7	Dizelist Penza	36	14	3	19	98	110	31
8.	HC Voronezh	36	11	6	19	102	107	28
9.	Kristall Saratov	36	6	1	29	68	226	13
10.	THK Tver	36	5	0	31	78	211	10
