= 2007–08 Vysshaya Liga season =

Russian ice hockey league season

The 2007–08 Vysshaya Liga season was the 16th season of the Vysshaya Liga, the second level of ice hockey in Russia. 30 teams participated in the league. Khimik Voskresensk won the league and was promoted to the Kontinental Hockey League for the 2008–09 season.

== First round ==
=== Western Conference ===
	Club	GP	W	OTW	OTL	L	GF	GA	Pts
1.	HC Dmitrov	60	36	7	9	8	224	129	131
2.	Dizel Penza	60	33	11	2	14	215	152	123
3.	Khimik Voskresensk	60	35	6	3	16	208	163	120
4.	Neftyanik Almetyevsk	60	31	6	6	17	197	152	111
5.	Sokil Kyiv	60	27	6	9	18	201	155	102
6.	Neftyanik Leninogorsk	60	29	3	6	22	186	162	99
7.	HC Belgorod	60	27	5	3	25	189	194	94
8.	Krylya Sovetov Moscow	60	22	9	7	22	232	214	91
9.	Ariada-Akpars Volzhsk	60	24	5	9	22	193	208	91
10.	Titan Klin	60	23	2	6	29	176	194	79
11.	HC Ryazan	60	19	6	4	31	178	207	73
12.	Kristall Saratov	60	18	4	8	30	165	201	70
13.	CSK VVS Samara	60	14	10	5	31	147	192	67
14.	Gazprom-OGU Orenburg	60	17	4	5	34	156	204	64
15.	Kristall Elektrostal	60	14	7	7	32	162	240	63
16.	Kapitan Stupino	60	19	1	3	37	166	228	62

=== Eastern Conference ===
	Club	GP	W	OTW	OTL	L	GF	GA	Pts
1.	Avtomobilist Yekaterinburg	52	34	4	4	10	171	89	114
2.	Barys Astana	52	33	4	6	9	178	106	113
3.	Kazzinc-Torpedo	52	29	4	5	14	169	114	100
4.	Kazakhmys Satpaev	52	26	6	4	16	176	151	94
5.	Sputnik Nizhny Tagil	52	25	7	3	17	160	132	92
6.	Izhstal Izhevsk	52	21	9	5	17	141	121	86
7.	Molot-Prikamie Perm	52	21	7	7	17	163	134	84
8.	Toros Neftekamsk	52	23	2	8	19	172	150	81
9.	Mechel Chelyabinsk	52	23	3	3	23	128	130	78
10.	Metallurg Serov	52	16	7	6	23	115	136	68
11.	Gazovik Tyumen	52	20	1	2	29	122	153	64
12.	Zauralie Kurgan	52	15	5	5	27	120	150	60
13.	Yuzhny Ural Orsk	52	10	6	4	32	112	195	46
14.	Ermak Angarsk	52	3	0	3	46	77	243	12

== Playoffs ==
First round
E1	Avtomobilist Yekaterinburg	3
W8	Krylya Sovetov Moscow	0
W4	Neftyanik Almetyevsk	3
E5	Sputnik Nizhny Tagil	0
W2	Dizel Penza	3
E7	Molot-Prikamie Perm	2
E3	Kazzinc-Torpedo	3
W6	Neftyanik Leninogorsk	1
E2	Barys Astana	3
W7	HC Belgorod	0
W3	Khimik Voskresensk	3
E6	Izhstal Izhevsk	0
W1	HC Dmitrov	3
E8	Toros Neftekamsk	1
E4	Kazakhmys Satpaev	3
W5	Sokil Kyiv	0

Quarterfinals
E1	Avtomobilist Yekaterinburg	3
W4	Neftyanik Almetyevsk	1
W2	Dizel Penza	3
E3	Kazzinc-Torpedo	1
E2	Barys Astana	1
W3	Khimik Voskresensk	3
W1	HC Dmitrov	0
E4	Kazakhmys Satpaev	3

Semifinals
E1	Avtomobilist Yekaterinburg	3
W2	Dizel Penza	1
W3	Khimik Voskresensk	3
E4	Kazakhmys Satpaev	0

Final
E1	Avtomobilist Yekaterinburg	1
W3	Khimik Voskresensk	3

=== 3rd place ===
- (E4) Kazakhmys Satpaev – (W2) Dizel Penza 3:0, 1:3
