= 2005–06 Kazakhstan Hockey Championship =

- League: Kazakhstan Hockey Championship
- Sport: Ice Hockey
- Number of teams: 6

Regular season
- Champions: Kazakhmys Karagandy
- Runners-up: Kazzinc-Torpedo

Kazakhstan Hockey Championship seasons
- ← 2004–05 2006–07 →

The 2005–06 Kazakhstan Hockey Championship was the 14th season of the Kazakhstan Hockey Championship, the top level of ice hockey in Kazakhstan. Six teams participated in the league, and Kazakhmys Karagandy won the championship.

== Standings ==
	GP	W	OTW	T	OTL	L	GF:GA	Pts
Kazakhmys Karagandy	20	14	0	2	1	3	89:33	45
Kazzinc-Torpedo	20	13	0	2	0	5	80:47	41
Gornyak Rudny	20	11	1	2	0	6	82:54	37
Barys Astana	20	8	1	4	0	7	51:51	30
Yertis Pavlodar	20	6	0	2	0	12	71:75	20
Yenbek Almaty	20	0	0	0	1	19	35:148	1
