= 2010–11 Kazakhstan Hockey Championship =

- League: Kazakhstan Hockey Championship
- Sport: Ice Hockey
- Number of teams: 10

Regular season
- Winners: Saryarka Karagandy

Playoffs

Finals
- Champions: Beibarys Atyrau
- Runners-up: Barys Astana-2

Kazakhstan Hockey Championship seasons
- ← 2009–10 2011–12 →

The 2010–11 Kazakhstan Hockey Championship was the 19th season of the Kazakhstan Hockey Championship, the top level of ice hockey in Kazakhstan. 10 teams participated in the league, and Beibarys Atyrau won the championship.

== Regular season ==
	GP	W	OTW	SOW	SOL	OTL	L	GF–GA	Pkt
Saryarka Karagandy	54	39	4	2	0	3	6	220:111	132
Beibarys Atyrau	54	37	1	1	3	1	11	177:99	119
Yertis Pavlodar	54	28	2	5	3	0	16	180:131	101
Barys Astana-2	54	24	1	4	4	1	20	177:191	87
Arystan Temirtau	54	20	3	5	1	2	23	170:143	79
Arlan Kokshetau	54	22	2	2	3	1	24	169:161	78
Gornyak Rudny	54	22	3	0	2	3	24	170:170	77
Kazakhmys Satpaev	54	17	1	2	3	3	28	161:194	63
HC Almaty	54	12	2	1	4	3	32	150:198	49
Kazzinc-Torpedo-2	54	6	0	2	1	2	43	96:272	25

== Playoffs ==
Quarterfinal
2	Beibarys Atyrau	3
7	Gornyak Rudny	0
3	Yertis Pavlodar	3
6	Arlan Kokshetau	1
1	Saryarka Karagandy	3
8	Kazakhmys Satpaev	0
4	Barys Astana-2	3
5	Arystan Temirtau	1

Semifinal
2	Beibarys Atyrau	4
3	Yertis Pavlodar	2
1	Saryarka Karagandy	3
4	Barys Astana-2	4

Final
2	Beibarys Atyrau	4
4	Barys Astana-2	0
