= 2009–10 Kazakhstan Hockey Championship =

- League: Kazakhstan Hockey Championship
- Sport: Ice Hockey
- Number of teams: 8

Regular season
- Winners: Saryarka Karagandy

Playoffs

Finals
- Champions: Saryarka Karagandy
- Runners-up: Beibarys Atyrau

Kazakhstan Hockey Championship seasons
- ← 2008–09 2010–11 →

The 2009–10 Kazakhstan Hockey Championship was the 18th season of the Kazakhstan Hockey Championship, the top level of ice hockey in Kazakhstan. Eight teams participated in the league, and Saryarka Karagandy won the championship.

== Regular season ==
	GP	W	OTW	SOW	SOL	OTL	L	GF:GA	Pkt
Saryarka Karagandy	56	39	0	3	1	0	13	218:95	124
Yertis Pavlodar	56	33	1	2	6	4	10	192:122	115
Beibarys Atyrau	56	32	2	2	5	3	12	203:105	112
Gornyak Rudny	56	29	2	3	0	1	21	182:153	98
Arlan Kokshetau	56	27	2	3	1	1	22	172:159	93
Kazakhmys Satpaev	56	16	2	4	5	2	27	160:200	67
Kazzinc-Torpedo-2	56	11	2	0	3	0	40	107:163	40
Barys Astana-2	56	4	0	5	1	0	46	92:329	23

== Playoffs ==
Semifinal
1	Saryarka Karagandy	3
4	Gornyak Rudny	0
2	Yertis Pavlodar	2
3	Beibarys Atyrau	3

Final
1	Saryarka Karagandy	3
3	Beibarys Atyrau	2
