= 2006–07 Kazakhstan Hockey Championship =

- League: Kazakhstan Hockey Championship
- Sport: Ice Hockey
- Number of teams: 7

Regular season
- Champions: Kazzinc-Torpedo
- Runners-up: Kazakhmys Satpaev

Kazakhstan Hockey Championship seasons
- ← 2005–06 2007–08 →

The 2006–07 Kazakhstan Hockey Championship was the 15th season of the Kazakhstan Hockey Championship, the top level of ice hockey in Kazakhstan. Seven teams participated in the league, and Kazzinc-Torpedo won the championship.

== Standings ==
	GP	W	OTW	T	OTL	L	GF:GA	Pts
Kazzinc-Torpedo	24	20	3	0	0	1	145:49	66
Kazakhmys Satpaev	24	16	1	0	1	6	119:50	51
Gornyak Rudny	24	13	1	0	3	7	88:81	44
Saryarka Karagandy	24	13	1	1	1	8	118:82	43
Barys Astana	24	9	1	1	1	12	93:76	41
Yertis Pavlodar	24	3	2	0	2	17	58:113	15
Yenbek Almaty	24	0	0	0	1	23	24:194	1
