= 2013 IIHF Women's World Championship rosters =

Each team's roster for the 2013 IIHF Women's World Championship consists of at least 15 skaters (forwards, and defencemen) and 2 goaltenders, and at most 20 skaters and 3 goaltenders. All eight participating nations, through the confirmation of their respective national associations, had to submit a roster by the first IIHF directorate meeting.

== Canada ==
The 23-player roster was announced on 18 March 2013.

- Head coach: Dan Church

=== Skaters ===
Number	Position	Player	Club	GP	G	A	Pts	PIM	+/−
2	F	Meghan Agosta-Marciano	(Canada) Montreal Stars	5	4	2	6	0	+7
3	D	Jocelyne Larocque	(Canada) Alberta Honeybadgers	5	0	2	2	8	+10
5	D	Lauriane Rougeau	(United States) Cornell Univ.	5	0	1	1	6	+10
6	F	Rebecca Johnston	(Canada) Toronto Furies	5	3	2	5	2	+4
8	D	Laura Fortino	(United States) Cornell Univ.	5	0	2	2	0	+6
9	F	Jenn Wakefield	(Canada) Toronto Furies	4	4	4	8	2	+5
10	F	Gillian Apps	(Canada) Brampton CWHL	5	0	2	2	2	+3
11	D	Courtney Birchard	(Canada) Brampton CWHL	5	1	2	3	4	+4
12	D	Meaghan Mikkelson Reid	(Canada) Alberta Honeybadgers	5	1	3	4	6	+10
13	F	Caroline Ouellette	(Canada) Montreal Stars	4	1	2	3	2	+2
16	F	Jayna Hefford	(Canada) Brampton CWHL	5	2	4	6	2	+11
17	F	Bailey Bram	(Canada) Brampton CWHL	5	1	1	2	0	+2
18	D	Catherine Ward	(Canada) Montreal Stars	5	1	6	7	18	+7
19	F	Brianne Jenner	(United States) Cornell Univ.	5	4	2	6	2	+6
21	F	Haley Irwin	(Canada) Montreal Stars	5	2	4	6	2	+8
22	F	Hayley Wickenheiser	(Canada) Calgary Univ.	3	0	0	0	2	0
24	F	Natalie Spooner	(Canada) Toronto Furies	5	2	0	2	0	+7
25	D	Tessa Bonhomme	(Canada) Toronto Furies	5	0	3	3	2	+7
26	F	Sarah Vaillancourt	(Canada) Montreal Stars	5	2	5	7	2	+8
29	F	Marie-Philip Poulin	(United States) Boston Univ.	5	6	6	12	2	+12

=== Goaltenders ===
Number	Player	Club	GP	W	L	Min	GA	GAA	SA	SV%	SO
1	Shannon Szabados	(Canada) Nait Ooks	4	2	1	243:35	6	1.48	93	93.55	1
31	Geneviève Lacasse	(United States) Boston Blades	0	0	0	00:00	0	0.00	0	00.00	0
32	Charline Labonté	(Canada) Montreal Stars	1	1	0	60:00	0	0.00	16	100.00	1

== Czech Republic ==
The 22-player roster was announced on 18 March 2013.

- Head coach: Karel Manhart

=== Skaters ===
Number	Position	Player	Club	GP	G	A	Pts	PIM	+/−
2	D	Aneta Tejralová	(Czech Republic) HC Slavia Praha	5	0	0	0	0	0
3	F	Klára Chmelová	(Czech Republic) HC Slavia Praha	5	2	2	4	0	0
4	D	Kateřina Flachsová	(Switzerland) DHC Langenthal	5	0	0	0	14	+1
5	D	Samantha Kolowratová	(Czech Republic) HC Slavia Praha	5	0	0	0	0	−1
6	D	Petra Herzigová	(Czech Republic) HC Slavia Praha	5	0	1	1	2	−2
9	F	Alena Polenská	(United States) Brown Univ.	5	1	1	2	6	0
10	F	Denisa Křížová	(United States) National Sports Academy	5	1	1	2	0	0
11	F	Simona Studentová	(Switzerland) HC Neuchâtel-Futur	5	0	0	0	0	−2
12	F	Eva Holešová	(Switzerland) HC Neuchâtel-Futur	5	1	0	1	4	−4
13	F	Lucie Povová	(United States) Northeastern Univ.	5	1	1	2	6	−1
14	D	Dominika Lásková	(Czech Republic) HC Slavia Praha	5	1	0	1	6	−2
15	F	Aneta Lédlová	(Czech Republic) HC Litvínov	5	0	2	2	0	+1
16	F	Kateřina Mrázová	(United States) Boston Blades	5	0	2	2	0	0
17	D	Pavlína Horálková	(Czech Republic) HC Slavia Praha	5	0	0	0	6	−2
18	D	Jana Fialová	(Canada) Nait Ooks	5	0	1	1	0	−1
19	F	Katka Kaplanová	(Czech Republic) SK Karviná	5	0	0	0	2	−2
21	F	Tereza Vanišová	(Czech Republic) HC Slavia Praha	5	0	1	1	4	−1
22	F	Lucie Manhartová	(United States) Norwich Univ.	5	1	0	1	8	−2
24	F	Dominika Vopravilová	(Czech Republic) HC Kladno	5	0	1	1	0	0
26	F	Vendula Přibylová	(Czech Republic) HC Olomouc	5	0	0	0	2	−2

=== Goaltenders ===
Number	Player	Club	GP	W	L	Min	GA	GAA	SA	SV%	SO
1	Radka Lhotská	(Germany) Salzgitter Icefighters	5	1	4	283:04	15	3.18	108	86.11	0
20	Kateřina Bečevová	(Czech Republic) HC Slavia Praha	1	0	0	19:54	2	6.03	10	80.00	0

== Finland ==
The 23-player roster was announced on 18 March 2013.

- Head coach: Mika Pieniniemi

=== Skaters ===
Number	Position	Player	Club	GP	G	A	Pts	PIM	+/−
2	D	Vilma Tarvainen	(Finland) Oulun Kärpät	6	0	0	0	0	−1
3	D	Emma Terho	(Finland) Espoo Blues	6	0	0	0	4	−7
4	D	Rosa Lindstedt	(Finland) JYP Jyväskylä	6	1	0	1	8	−2
5	D	Anna Kilponen	(Finland) Team Kuortane	6	0	0	0	0	−7
6	D	Jenni Hiirikoski	(Finland) JYP Jyväskylä	6	0	1	1	2	−4
7	D	Mira Jalosuo	(United States) Univ. Minnesota	6	0	1	1	4	−4
8	F	Marjo Voutilainen	(Finland) KalPa	6	0	1	1	2	−1
9	F	Venla Hovi	(Finland) KalPa	5	0	0	0	0	−7
11	F	Anniina Rajahuhta	(Finland) Espoo Blues	6	1	0	1	6	−4
12	F	Susanna Tapani	(Finland) Espoo Blues	6	0	0	0	2	−7
13	F	Linda Välimäki	(Finland) Espoo Blues	6	0	2	2	4	−4
14	F	Niina Mäkinen	(Finland) Oulun Kärpät	6	0	0	0	0	−1
15	F	Minttu Tuominen	(United States) Ohio State Univ.	6	0	0	0	2	−5
18	D	Tea Villilä	(United States) Univ. of Minnesota Duluth	6	0	0	0	6	−1
20	D	Saija Tarkki	(Finland) Oulun Kärpät	6	0	0	0	2	−2
21	F	Michelle Karvinen	(United States) Univ. of North Dakota	6	3	1	4	4	−1
23	F	Nina Tikkinen	(Finland) Oulun Kärpät	6	0	1	1	2	0
26	F	Tiina Saarimäki	(Finland) Ilves	6	0	0	0	0	−1
28	F	Anne Tuomanen	(Finland) Ilves	6	0	0	0	4	−3
29	F	Karoliina Rantamäki	(Russia) SKIF	6	0	1	1	0	0

=== Goaltenders ===
Number	Player	Club	GP	W	L	Min	GA	GAA	SA	SV%	SO
30	Meeri Räisänen	(Finland) JYP Jyväskylä	2	1	0	75:34	2	1.59	19	89.47	1
31	Isabella Portnoj	(Finland) Espoo Blues	0	0	0	00:00	0	0.00	0	00.00	0
41	Noora Räty	(United States) Univ. of Minnesota	5	1	4	282:32	14	2.97	154	90.91	0

== Germany ==
The 21-player roster was announced on 18 March 2013.

- Head coach: Peter Kathan

=== Skaters ===
Number	Position	Player	Club	GP	G	A	Pts	PIM	+/−
3	F	Sophie Kratzer	(Germany) ESC Planegg-Würmtal	5	0	1	1	2	0
4	D	Jessica Hammerl	(Germany) ESC Planegg-Würmtal	5	0	0	0	4	0
5	F	Manuela Anwander	(Germany) ERC Ingolstadt	5	1	3	4	0	−1
6	F	Bettina Evers	(Germany) ESC Planegg-Würmtal	5	0	0	0	0	−2
7	F	Nina Kamenik	(Germany) OSC Berlin	5	0	2	2	0	0
8	F	Julia Zorn	(Germany) ESC Planegg-Würmtal	5	1	1	2	0	−4
9	F	Maritta Becker	(Germany) ESC Planegg-Würmtal	5	1	1	2	4	0
10	D	Anja Weisser	(Canada) UPEI Panthers	5	0	0	0	4	0
12	F	Susann Götz	(Germany) OSC Berlin	5	1	1	2	2	−4
13	F	Kerstin Spielberger	(Germany) EHC Klostersee	5	0	3	3	2	+1
15	F	Andrea Lanzl	(Germany) ESC Planegg-Würmtal	5	1	0	1	2	−1
17	F	Sara Seiler	(Canada) Ottawa Ice Cats	5	1	2	3	2	−1
18	D	Susanne Fellner	(Germany) ECDC Memmingen	5	0	2	2	0	−1
19	F	Marie Delarbre	(United States) Univ. of Minnesota Duluth	5	1	0	1	0	−2
20	D	Daria Gleissner	(Germany) ECDC Memmingen	5	0	1	1	4	−1
21	D	Ronja Richter	(Germany) ESC Planegg-Würmtal	5	0	0	0	0	−2
23	D	Tanja Eisenschmid	(United States) Univ. of North Dakota	5	0	0	0	4	−2
24	F	Lisa Schuster	(Germany) ESC Planegg-Würmtal	5	2	0	2	0	−1
25	F	Franziska Busch	(Germany) ECDC Memmingen	5	4	1	5	4	−3
26	F	Monika Bittner	(Germany) ESC Planegg-Würmtal	5	0	0	0	4	0

=== Goaltenders ===
Number	Player	Club	GP	W	L	Min	GA	GAA	SA	SV%	SO
1	Ivonne Schroder	(Germany) Tornado Niesky	0	0	0	00:00	0	0.00	0	00.00	0
27	Viona Harrer	(Germany) EC Bad Tölz	3	2	1	180:00	10	3.33	98	89.80	0
30	Jennifer Harß	(Germany) ECDC Memmingen	2	0	2	120:53	4	1.99	76	94.74	0

== Russia ==
- Head coach: Mikhail Chekanov

=== Skaters ===
Number	Position	Player	Club	GP	G	A	Pts	PIM	+/−
2	D	Angelina Goncharenko	(Russia) Belye Medvedi Moscow	6	0	0	0	2	−3
7	F	Yekaterina Solovyova	(Russia) Fakel Chelyabinsk	6	1	0	1	2	0
8	F	Iya Gavrilova	(Canada) Calgary Univ.	6	0	3	3	0	−1
9	F	Alexandra Vafina	(United States) Univ. of Minnesota Duluth	6	3	1	4	4	+4
10	F	Liudmila Belyakova	(Russia) Severnaya Zvezda Moscow	6	1	0	1	4	0
17	F	Yekaterina Smolentseva	(Russia) Tornado Moscow Region	6	3	2	5	2	0
18	F	Olga Sosina	(Russia) SKIF Nizhni Novgorod	3	0	0	0	0	−2
21	D	Anna Shukina	(Russia) Tornado Moscow Region	6	0	0	0	0	−2
23	F	Tatyana Burina	(Russia) Tornado Moscow Region	6	2	3	5	0	+5
25	F	Yekaterina Lebedeva	(Russia) Fakel Chelyabinsk	6	1	4	5	0	+4
26	F	Yelena Dergachyova	(United States) Scanion Creek Academy	6	1	1	2	2	+1
27	D	Inna Dyubanok	(Russia) Tornado Moscow Region	6	0	0	0	4	+4
32	F	Valeria Pavlova	(Russia) Tyumenskie Lisitsy	6	0	1	1	2	−1
34	D	Svetlana Tkachyova	(Russia) Tornado Moscow Region	6	2	0	2	6	+4
44	D	Alexandra Kapustina	(Russia) SKIF Nizhni Novgorod	6	0	3	3	0	0
52	F	Yekaterina Pashkevich	(Russia) Tornado Moscow Region	6	0	0	0	2	−2
55	F	Galina Skiba	(Russia) Tornado Moscow Region	6	1	1	2	6	+2
70	D	Anna Shibanova	(Russia) Salavat Yulaev Ufa	6	1	3	4	4	+2
88	F	Yekaterina Smolina	(Russia) Tornado Moscow Region	6	0	1	1	2	0
91	D	Yekaterina Ananina	(Russia) Fakel Chelyabinsk	6	0	0	0	0	−1

=== Goaltenders ===
Number	Player	Club	GP	W	L	Min	GA	GAA	SA	SV%	SO
1	Anna Prugova	(Russia) Tornado Moscow	3	1	1	130:16	7	3.22	66	89.39	0
31	Nadezhda Alexandrova	(Russia) SKIF Novgorod	4	4	0	209:44	1	0.29	73	98.63	2
97	Yulia Leskina	(Russia) Spartak-Merkuri	1	0	0	20:00	2	6.00	12	83.33	0

== Sweden ==
The 23-player roster was announced on 18 March 2013.

- Head coach: Niclas Högberg

=== Skaters ===
Number	Position	Player	Club	GP	G	A	Pts	PIM	+/−
2	F	Elin Holmlöv	(Russia) HC Tornado	5	2	0	2	4	+2
3	D	Frida Nevalainen	(Sweden) Segeltorps IF	5	0	0	0	2	+4
4	F	Jenni Asserholt	(Sweden) Linköpings HC	5	0	1	1	6	+1
5	D	Johanna Fällman	(United States) Univ. of North Dakota	5	0	0	0	6	−2
6	D	Lina Bäcklin	(Sweden) Brynäs IF	5	0	0	0	0	0
7	D	Johanna Olofsson	(Sweden) Modo Hockey	4	1	0	1	8	+2
10	D	Emilia Andersson	(United States) Minnesota State Univ.	5	0	0	0	0	+4
11	F	Cecilia Östberg	(Sweden) Leksands IF	4	0	0	0	0	+1
12	D	Linnea Hedin	(Sweden) AIK IF	5	0	0	0	4	−2
13	F	Lina Wester	(Sweden) Brynäs IF	5	1	2	3	8	+1
15	F	Lisa Johansson	(Sweden) AIK IF	5	3	0	3	2	0
16	F	Pernilla Winberg	(United States) Univ. of Minnesota Duluth	5	1	1	2	2	−1
17	D	Linnea Bäckman	(Sweden) AIK IF	5	1	0	1	4	0
18	F	Anna Borgqvist	(Sweden) Brynäs IF	5	0	3	3	0	+4
22	F	Emma Eliasson	(Sweden) Munksund Skuthamn SK	5	1	2	3	2	0
23	F	Lisa Hedengren	(Sweden) AIK IF	5	0	1	1	2	+1
24	F	Erika Grahm	(Sweden) Modo Hockey	5	1	0	1	4	−1
27	F	Michelle Löwenhielm	(Sweden) AIK IF	5	0	0	0	0	0
28	F	Olivia Carlsson	(Sweden) Modo Hockey	5	0	0	0	0	−1
29	F	Gizela Blom	(Sweden) AIK IF	4	0	0	0	0	0

=== Goaltenders ===
Number	Player	Club	GP	W	L	Min	GA	GAA	SA	SV%	SO
1	Sara Grahn	(Sweden) Brynäs IF	4	2	0	211:06	3	0.85	67	95.52	1
30	Minatsu Murase	(Sweden) AIK IF	0	0	0	00:00	0	0.00	0	00.00	0
35	Valentina Lizana	(Sweden) Modo Hockey	2	0	2	89:53	6	4.01	49	87.76	0

== Switzerland ==
- Head coach: René Kammerer

=== Skaters ===
Number	Position	Player	Club	GP	G	A	Pts	PIM	+/−
2	F	Katrin Nabholz	(Switzerland) ZSC Lions	5	1	1	2	0	−6
6	D	Julia Marty	(Switzerland) SC Reinach	5	1	1	2	6	−6
9	F	Stefanie Marty	(Switzerland) SC Reinach	5	0	2	2	4	−6
10	D	Nicole Bullo	(Switzerland) HC Lugano	5	0	1	1	0	−7
11	D	Meryl Vaucher	(Switzerland) Univ. of Neuchâtel	5	0	0	0	0	−5
12	F	Andrea Schwanz	(Switzerland) EV Bomo Thun	5	0	0	0	0	−1
13	F	Sara Benz	(Switzerland) ZSC Lions	5	1	0	1	2	−4
14	F	Romy Eggimann	(Switzerland) HC Lugano	5	0	0	0	2	−2
15	F	Monika Waidacher	(United States) College St. Scholastica	5	0	0	0	0	−1
17	D	Sarah Forster	(Switzerland) HC Lugano	5	0	0	0	0	−8
18	F	Evelina Raselli	(Switzerland) HC Lugano	5	0	1	1	0	−6
19	F	Isabel Waidacher	(Switzerland) ZSC Lions	5	0	1	1	4	−2
21	F	Jessica Lutz	(Switzerland) EV Bomo Thun	5	2	0	2	4	−5
22	D	Livia Altmann	(Switzerland) ZSC Lions	5	0	0	0	0	−5
23	D	Karin Williner	(Switzerland) Univ. of Neuchâtel	5	0	0	0	6	−4
24	D	Sabrina Zollinger	(Switzerland) EHC Winterthur	5	0	0	0	6	−2
63	F	Anja Stiefel	(Switzerland) SC Reinach	5	0	0	0	0	−8
86	F	Mariko Dale	(Switzerland) SC Reinach	5	0	0	0	2	−2
88	F	Phoebe Stanz	(United States) Choate Rosemary Hall	4	0	1	1	8	−5
92	D	Sandra Thalmann	(Switzerland) SC Reinach	5	0	0	0	8	−6

=== Goaltenders ===
Number	Player	Club	GP	W	L	Min	GA	GAA	SA	SV%	SO
28	Sophie Anthamatten	(Switzerland) HC Lugano	1	0	1	47:37	10	12.60	64	84.38	0
33	Dominique Slongo	(Switzerland) SC Reinach	1	0	0	12:23	3	14.54	15	80.00	0
41	Florence Schelling	(Canada) Brampton CWHL	4	0	4	237:51	13	3.28	159	91.82	0

== United States ==
A 28-player roster was announced on 21 March 2013.

- Head coach: Katey Stone

=== Skaters ===
Number	Position	Player	Club	GP	G	A	Pts	PIM	+/−
2	D	Lee Stecklein	(United States) Univ. of Minnesota	3	0	1	1	2	+3
7	F	Monique Lamoureux-Kolls	(United States) Univ. of North Dakota	5	4	0	4	6	+2
9	D	Megan Bozek	(United States) Univ. of Minnesota	5	1	2	3	2	+1
10	F	Meghan Duggan	(United States) Boston Blades	5	0	1	1	4	0
11	D	Lisa Chesson		5	0	1	1	0	+4
13	F	Julie Chu	(Canada) Montreal Stars	5	1	0	1	0	+1
14	F	Brianna Decker	(United States) Univ. of Wisconsin	5	6	2	8	4	+6
15	D	Anne Schleper	(United States) Boston Blades	5	0	1	1	2	−1
17	F	Jocelyne Lamoureux	(United States) Univ. of North Dakota	5	0	5	5	4	+2
18	F	Lyndsey Fry	(United States) Harvard Univ.	4	0	0	0	0	0
19	D	Gisele Marvin	(United States) Boston Blades	5	0	4	4	0	+4
20	F	Jen Schoullis	(United States) Boston Blades	4	0	0	0	4	+1
21	F	Hilary Knight	(United States) Boston Blades	5	1	1	2	4	−3
22	D	Kacey Bellamy	(United States) Boston Blades	5	0	1	1	6	+3
23	D	Michelle Picard	(United States) Harvard Univ.	5	0	0	0	0	0
25	F	Sarah Erickson	(United States) Univ. of Minnesota Duluth	3	0	0	0	4	0
26	F	Kendall Coyne	(United States) Northeastern Univ.	5	1	4	5	2	+5
27	F	Kelley Steadman	(United States) Boston Blades	4	0	0	0	2	0
28	F	Amanda Kessel	(United States) Univ. of Minnesota	5	2	6	8	0	+6
36	F	Alex Carpenter	(United States) Boston College	5	1	2	3	0	+1

=== Goaltenders ===
Number	Player	Club	GP	W	L	Min	GA	GAA	SA	SV%	SO
29	Brianne McLaughlin		1	1	0	60:00	2	2.00	13	84.62	0
31	Jessica Vetter	(United States) Oregon Outlaws	4	3	1	245:00	5	1.22	60	91.67	2
33	Alex Rigsby	(United States) Wisconsin Univ.	0	0	0	00:00	0	0.00	0	00.00	0
