= List of Russian national ice hockey team rosters =

Below is a list of various national ice hockey team rosters of Russia. The men's, women's and the junior team are included.

== Men's ==
=== 2014 Winter Olympics ===
The following is the Russian roster in the men's ice hockey tournament of the 2014 Winter Olympics.

Head coach: (Russia) Zinetula Bilyaletdinov Assistant coach: (Russia) Valery Belov

No.	Pos.	Name	Height	Weight	Birthdate	Birthplace	2013–14 team
1	G	Semyon Varlamov	185 cm (6 ft 1 in)	85 kg (187 lb)	27 April 1988	Kuybyshev, Soviet Union	(United States) Colorado Avalanche (NHL)
5	D	Ilya Nikulin	191 cm (6 ft 3 in)	98 kg (216 lb)	12 March 1982	Moscow, Soviet Union	(Russia) Ak Bars Kazan (KHL)
6	D	Nikita Nikitin	193 cm (6 ft 4 in)	89 kg (196 lb)	16 June 1986	Omsk, Soviet Union	(United States) Columbus Blue Jackets (NHL)
8	F	Alexander Ovechkin – A	189 cm (6 ft 2 in)	99 kg (218 lb)	17 September 1985	Moscow, Soviet Union	(United States) Washington Capitals (NHL)
10	F	Viktor Tikhonov	188 cm (6 ft 2 in)	83 kg (183 lb)	12 May 1988	Riga, Latvian SSR, Soviet Union	(Russia) SKA Saint Petersburg (KHL)
11	F	Evgeni Malkin	192 cm (6 ft 4 in)	86 kg (190 lb)	31 July 1986	Magnitogorsk, Soviet Union	(United States) Pittsburgh Penguins (NHL)
13	F	Pavel Datsyuk – C	180 cm (5 ft 11 in)	86 kg (190 lb)	20 July 1978	Sverdlovsk, Soviet Union	(United States) Detroit Red Wings (NHL)
15	F	Alexander Svitov	192 cm (6 ft 4 in)	106 kg (234 lb)	3 November 1982	Omsk, Soviet Union	(Russia) Ak Bars Kazan (KHL)
24	F	Alexander Popov	178 cm (5 ft 10 in)	82 kg (181 lb)	31 August 1980	Angarsk, Soviet Union	(Russia) Avangard Omsk (KHL)
26	D	Vyacheslav Voynov	180 cm (5 ft 11 in)	83 kg (183 lb)	15 January 1990	Chelyabinsk, Soviet Union	(United States) Los Angeles Kings (NHL)
27	F	Alexei Tereshchenko	180 cm (5 ft 11 in)	80 kg (176 lb)	16 December 1980	Mozhaisk, Soviet Union	(Russia) Ak Bars Kazan (KHL)
28	F	Alexander Semin	189 cm (6 ft 2 in)	95 kg (209 lb)	3 March 1984	Krasnoyarsk, Soviet Union	(United States) Carolina Hurricanes (NHL)
30	G	Alexander Yeryomenko	179 cm (5 ft 10 in)	75 kg (165 lb)	10 April 1980	Moscow, Soviet Union	(Russia) Dynamo Moscow (KHL)
41	F	Nikolai Kulemin	185 cm (6 ft 1 in)	100 kg (220 lb)	14 July 1986	Magnitogorsk, Soviet Union	(Canada) Toronto Maple Leafs (NHL)
42	F	Artem Anisimov	193 cm (6 ft 4 in)	88 kg (194 lb)	24 May 1988	Yaroslavl, Soviet Union	(United States) Columbus Blue Jackets (NHL)
43	F	Valeri Nichushkin	190 cm (6 ft 3 in)	80 kg (176 lb)	4 March 1995	Chelyabinsk	(United States) Dallas Stars (NHL)
47	F	Alexander Radulov	186 cm (6 ft 1 in)	91 kg (201 lb)	5 July 1986	Nizhny Tagil, Soviet Union	(Russia) CSKA Moscow (KHL)
51	D	Fedor Tyutin	188 cm (6 ft 2 in)	95 kg (209 lb)	19 July 1983	Izhevsk, Soviet Union	(United States) Columbus Blue Jackets (NHL)
71	F	Ilya Kovalchuk – A	188 cm (6 ft 2 in)	104 kg (229 lb)	15 April 1983	Kalinin, Soviet Union	(Russia) SKA Saint Petersburg (KHL)
72	G	Sergei Bobrovsky	188 cm (6 ft 2 in)	86 kg (190 lb)	20 September 1988	Novokuznetsk, Soviet Union	(United States) Columbus Blue Jackets (NHL)
74	D	Alexei Emelin	185 cm (6 ft 1 in)	97 kg (214 lb)	25 April 1986	Togliatti, Soviet Union	(Canada) Montreal Canadiens (NHL)
77	D	Anton Belov	192 cm (6 ft 4 in)	96 kg (212 lb)	29 July 1986	Ryazan, Soviet Union	(Canada) Edmonton Oilers (NHL)
79	D	Andrei Markov	183 cm (6 ft 0 in)	92 kg (203 lb)	20 December 1978	Voskresensk, Soviet Union	(Canada) Montreal Canadiens (NHL)
82	D	Yevgeny Medvedev	190 cm (6 ft 3 in)	87 kg (192 lb)	27 August 1982	Chelyabinsk, Soviet Union	(Russia) Ak Bars Kazan (KHL)
91	F	Vladimir Tarasenko	184 cm (6 ft 0 in)	95 kg (209 lb)	13 December 1991	Yaroslavl, Soviet Union	(United States) St. Louis Blues (NHL)

=== 2010 World Championship ===
The following is the Russian roster in the 2010 Men's World Ice Hockey Championship.

No.	Pos.	Name	Height	Weight	Birthdate	Birthplace	2009–10 team
30	G	Alexander Eremenko	179 cm (5 ft 10 in)	75 kg (165 lb)	10 April 1980	Moscow	Salavat Yulaev Ufa (KHL)
40	G	Semyon Varlamov	182 cm (6 ft 0 in)	88 kg (194 lb)	27 April 1988	Kuybyshev	Washington Capitals (NHL)
83	G	Vasili Koshechkin	200 cm (6 ft 7 in)	91 kg (201 lb)	27 March 1983	Ust-Kamenogorsk, Kazakh SSR	Metallurg Magnitogorsk (KHL)
5	D	Ilya Nikulin	191 cm (6 ft 3 in)	100 kg (220 lb)	12 March 1982	Moscow	Ak Bars Kazan (KHL)
7	D	Dmitri Kalinin	189 cm (6 ft 2 in)	96 kg (212 lb)	22 July 1980	Chelyabinsk	Salavat Yulaev Ufa (KHL)
22	D	Konstantin Korneyev	180 cm (5 ft 11 in)	82 kg (181 lb)	5 June 1984	Moscow	CSKA Moscow (KHL)
27	D	Vitali Atyushov	188 cm (6 ft 2 in)	88 kg (194 lb)	4 June 1979	Penza	Metallurg Magnitogorsk (KHL)
37	D	Denis Grebeshkov	185 cm (6 ft 1 in)	93 kg (205 lb)	11 October 1983	Yaroslavl	Edmonton Oilers (NHL)
74	D	Alexei Yemelin	185 cm (6 ft 1 in)	94 kg (207 lb)	25 April 1986	Tolyatti	Ak Bars Kazan (KHL)
55	D	Sergei Gonchar	180 cm (5 ft 11 in)	80 kg (180 lb)	13 April 1974	Chelyabinsk	Pittsburgh Penguins (NHL)
8	LW	Alexander Ovechkin	188 cm (6 ft 2 in)	108 kg (238 lb)	17 September 1985	Moscow	Washington Capitals (NHL)
10	RW	Sergey Mozyakin	178 cm (5 ft 10 in)	78 kg (172 lb)	30 March 1981	Yaroslavl	Atlant Moscow Oblast (KHL)
11	C	Evgeni Malkin	191 cm (6 ft 3 in)	88 kg (194 lb)	31 July 1986	Magnitogorsk	Pittsburgh Penguins (NHL)
13	C	Pavel Datsyuk	180 cm (5 ft 11 in)	88 kg (194 lb)	20 July 1978	Sverdlovsk	Detroit Red Wings (NHL)
23	C	Alexei Tereshchenko	181 cm (5 ft 11 in)	78 kg (172 lb)	16 December 1980	Mozhaysk	Ak Bars Kazan (KHL)
24	LW	Alexander Frolov	188 cm (6 ft 2 in)	105 kg (231 lb)	19 June 1982	Moscow	Los Angeles Kings (NHL)
28	LW	Alexander Semin	189 cm (6 ft 2 in)	93 kg (205 lb)	3 March 1984	Krasnoyarsk	Washington Capitals (NHL)
29	C	Sergei Fedorov	189 cm (6 ft 2 in)	92 kg (203 lb)	13 December 1969	Pskov	Metallurg Magnitogorsk (KHL)
33	RW	Maxim Sushinski	173 cm (5 ft 8 in)	87 kg (192 lb)	1 June 1974	Leningrad	SKA Saint Petersburg (KHL)
41	LW	Nikolai Kulemin	185 cm (6 ft 1 in)	83 kg (183 lb)	14 July 1986	Magnitogorsk	Toronto Maple Leafs (NHL)
42	C	Artem Anisimov	194 cm (6 ft 4 in)	89 kg (196 lb)	24 May 1988	Yaroslavl	New York Rangers (NHL)
52	C	Viktor Kozlov	196 cm (6 ft 5 in)	107 kg (236 lb)	14 February 1975	Tolyatti	Salavat Yulaev Ufa (KHL)
61	RW	Maxim Afinogenov	183 cm (6 ft 0 in)	86 kg (190 lb)	4 September 1979	Moscow	Atlanta Thrashers (NHL)
71	LW	Ilya Kovalchuk	187 cm (6 ft 2 in)	107 kg (236 lb)	15 April 1983	Kalinin	New Jersey Devils (NHL)

=== 2010 Winter Olympics ===
The following is the Russian roster in the men's ice hockey tournament of the 2010 Winter Olympics.

No.	Pos.	Name	Height	Weight	Birthdate	Birthplace	2009–10 team
30	G	Ilya Bryzgalov	191 cm (6 ft 3 in)	90 kg (200 lb)	22 June 1980	Tolyatti	(United States) Phoenix Coyotes (NHL)
20	G	Evgeni Nabokov	183 cm (6 ft 0 in)	91 kg (201 lb)	25 July 1975	Ust-Kamenogorsk, Kazakh SSR	(United States) San Jose Sharks (NHL)
40	G	Semyon Varlamov	191 cm (6 ft 3 in)	96 kg (212 lb)	27 April 1988	Kuybyshev	(United States) Washington Capitals (NHL)
55	D	Sergei Gonchar	188 cm (6 ft 2 in)	98 kg (216 lb)	13 April 1974	Chelyabinsk	(United States) Pittsburgh Penguins (NHL)
37	D	Denis Grebeshkov	185 cm (6 ft 1 in)	88 kg (194 lb)	11 October 1983	Yaroslavl	(Canada) Edmonton Oilers (NHL)
7	D	Dmitri Kalinin	191 cm (6 ft 3 in)	93 kg (205 lb)	22 July 1980	Chelyabinsk	(Russia) Salavat Yulaev Ufa (KHL)
22	D	Konstantin Korneyev	180 cm (5 ft 11 in)	82 kg (181 lb)	5 June 1984	Moscow	(Russia) CSKA Moscow (KHL)
79	D	Andrei Markov	183 cm (6 ft 0 in)	92 kg (203 lb)	20 December 1978	Voskresensk	(Canada) Montreal Canadiens (NHL)
5	D	Ilya Nikulin	191 cm (6 ft 3 in)	100 kg (220 lb)	12 March 1982	Moscow	(Russia) Ak Bars Kazan (KHL)
51	D	Fedor Tyutin	188 cm (6 ft 2 in)	95 kg (209 lb)	19 July 1983	Izhevsk	(United States) Columbus Blue Jackets (NHL)
6	D	Anton Volchenkov	185 cm (6 ft 1 in)	107 kg (236 lb)	15 February 1982	Moscow	(Canada) Ottawa Senators (NHL)
61	RW	Maxim Afinogenov	183 cm (6 ft 0 in)	86 kg (190 lb)	4 September 1979	Moscow	(United States) Atlanta Thrashers (NHL)
13	C	Pavel Datsyuk	180 cm (5 ft 11 in)	88 kg (194 lb)	20 July 1978	Sverdlovsk	(United States) Detroit Red Wings (NHL)
29	C	Sergei Fedorov	188 cm (6 ft 2 in)	93 kg (205 lb)	13 December 1969	Pskov	(Russia) Metallurg Magnitogorsk (KHL)
71	LW	Ilya Kovalchuk – A	187 cm (6 ft 2 in)	107 kg (236 lb)	15 April 1983	Kalinin	(United States) New Jersey Devils (NHL)
52	RW	Viktor Kozlov	196 cm (6 ft 5 in)	107 kg (236 lb)	14 February 1975	Tolyatti	(Russia) Salavat Yulaev Ufa (KHL)
11	C	Evgeni Malkin	191 cm (6 ft 3 in)	88 kg (194 lb)	31 July 1986	Magnitogorsk	(United States) Pittsburgh Penguins (NHL)
95	RW	Aleksey Morozov – C	188 cm (6 ft 2 in)	89 kg (196 lb)	16 February 1977	Moscow	(Russia) Ak Bars Kazan (KHL)
8	LW	Alexander Ovechkin – A	188 cm (6 ft 2 in)	108 kg (238 lb)	17 September 1985	Moscow	(United States) Washington Capitals (NHL)
47	RW	Alexander Radulov	185 cm (6 ft 1 in)	85 kg (187 lb)	5 July 1986	Nizhny Tagil	(Russia) Salavat Yulaev Ufa (KHL)
28	LW	Alexander Semin	188 cm (6 ft 2 in)	93 kg (205 lb)	3 March 1984	Krasnoyarsk	(United States) Washington Capitals (NHL)
25	LW	Danis Zaripov	185 cm (6 ft 1 in)	84 kg (185 lb)	26 March 1981	Chelyabinsk	(Russia) Ak Bars Kazan (KHL)
42	C	Sergei Zinovjev	178 cm (5 ft 10 in)	81 kg (179 lb)	4 March 1980	Prokopyevsk	(Russia) Salavat Yulaev Ufa (KHL)

Defencemen Sergei Zubov, Oleg Tverdovsky and Vitali Proshkin, forwards Alexei Kovalev, Alexander Frolov, Nikolai Kulemin and Alexei Tereschenko, and goaltenders Vasiliy Koshechkin and Alexander Eremenko were selected as reserves in case of injury during the tournament.

== Women's ==
=== 2014 Winter Olympics ===
The following is the Russian roster in the women's ice hockey tournament of the 2014 Winter Olympics.

Head coach: (Russia) Mikhail Chekanov Assistant coach: (Russia) Yuri Novikov

No.	Pos.	Name	Height	Weight	Birthdate	Birthplace	2013–14 team
1	G	Anna Prugova	175 cm (5 ft 9 in)	62 kg (137 lb)	20 November 1993	Khabarovsk	(Russia) Tornado Moscow Region (RWHL)
2	D	Angelina Goncharenko	177 cm (5 ft 10 in)	71 kg (157 lb)	23 May 1994	Moscow	(Russia) Agidel Ufa (RWHL)
4	D	Alena Khomich	168 cm (5 ft 6 in)	53 kg (117 lb)	26 February 1981	Pervouralsk, Soviet Union	(Russia) Agidel Ufa (RWHL)
8	F	Iya Gavrilova	170 cm (5 ft 7 in)	63 kg (139 lb)	3 September 1987	Krasnoyarsk, Soviet Union	(Russia) Tornado Moscow Region (RWHL)
9	F	Alexandra Vafina	165 cm (5 ft 5 in)	58 kg (128 lb)	28 July 1990	Almaty, Kazakh SSR, Soviet Union	(Russia) Fakel Chelyabinsk (RWHL)
17	F	Yekaterina Smolentseva	176 cm (5 ft 9 in)	64 kg (141 lb)	15 September 1981	Pervouralsk	(Russia) Tornado Moscow Region (RWHL)
18	F	Olga Sosina	163 cm (5 ft 4 in)	77 kg (170 lb)	27 July 1992	Almetyevsk	(Russia) SKIF Nizhni Novgorod (RWHL)
20	G	Yulia Leskina	178 cm (5 ft 10 in)	76 kg (168 lb)	9 February 1991	Pervouralsk, Soviet Union	(Russia) Spartak-Merkuri Yekaterinburg (RWHL)
21	D	Anna Shukina	171 cm (5 ft 7 in)	76 kg (168 lb)	5 November 1987	Balakirevo, Soviet Union	(Russia) Tornado Moscow Region (RWHL)
23	F	Tatiana Burina	163 cm (5 ft 4 in)	68 kg (150 lb)	20 March 1980	Novosibirsk, Soviet Union	(Russia) Tornado Moscow Region (RWHL)
25	F	Yekaterina Lebedeva	165 cm (5 ft 5 in)	69 kg (152 lb)	14 September 1989	Sverdlovsk, Soviet Union	(Russia) Fakel Chelyabinsk (RWHL)
29	F	Anna Shokhina	163 cm (5 ft 4 in)	60 kg (132 lb)	23 June 1997	Novosinkovo	(Russia) Tornado Moscow Region (RWHL)
34	D	Svetlana Tkacheva	170 cm (5 ft 7 in)	60 kg (132 lb)	3 November 1984	Moscow, Soviet Union	(Russia) Tornado Moscow Region (RWHL)
44	D	Alexandra Kapustina	166 cm (5 ft 5 in)	74 kg (163 lb)	7 April 1984	Pervouralsk, Soviet Union	(Russia) SKIF Nizhny Novgorod (RWHL)
55	F	Galina Skiba	164 cm (5 ft 5 in)	66 kg (146 lb)	9 May 1984	Kharkiv, Ukrainian SSR, Soviet Union	(Russia) Tornado Moscow Region (RWHL)
70	D	Anna Shibanova	164 cm (5 ft 5 in)	62 kg (137 lb)	10 November 1994	Omsk	(Russia) Agidel Ufa (RWHL)
72	F	Yekaterina Pashkevich	174 cm (5 ft 9 in)	74 kg (163 lb)	19 December 1972	Moscow, Soviet Union	(Russia) Agidel Ufa (RWHL)
77	D	Inna Dyubanok	170 cm (5 ft 7 in)	74 kg (163 lb)	20 February 1990	Mozhaysk, Soviet Union	(Russia) Agidel Ufa (RWHL)
88	F	Yekaterina Smolina	164 cm (5 ft 5 in)	54 kg (119 lb)	8 October 1988	Ust-Kamenogorsk, Kazakh SSR, Soviet Union	(Russia) Tornado Moscow Region (RWHL)
95	F	Yelena Dergachyova	159 cm (5 ft 3 in)	57 kg (126 lb)	8 November 1995	Moscow	(Russia) Agidel Ufa (RWHL)
97	G	Anna Vinogradova	167 cm (5 ft 6 in)	69 kg (152 lb)	6 April 1991	Chelyabinsk, Soviet Union	(Russia) Fakel Chelyabinsk (RWHL)

=== 2010 Winter Olympics ===
The following is the Russian roster in the women's ice hockey tournament of the 2010 Winter Olympics.

Head coach: (Russia) Valentin Gureev Assistant coach: (Russia) Alexei Chistyakov

No.	Pos.	Name	Height	Weight	Birthdate	Birthplace	2009–10 team
1	G	Anna Prugova	1.74 m (5 ft 9 in)	62 kg (137 lb)	20 November 1993	Khabarovsk	(Russia) Tornado Dmitrov
4	D	Alena Khomich	1.68 m (5 ft 6 in)	55 kg (121 lb)	26 February 1981	Pervouralsk, Soviet Union	(Russia) SKIF Nizhny Novgorod
7	F	Olga Sosina	1.60 m (5 ft 3 in)	66 kg (146 lb)	27 July 1992	Almetyevsk	(Russia) SKIF Nizhny Novgorod
8	F	Iya Gavrilova – A	1.73 m (5 ft 8 in)	67 kg (148 lb)	3 September 1987	Krasnoyarsk, Soviet Union	(Russia) Tornado Dmitrov
9	F	Alexandra Vafina	1.68 m (5 ft 6 in)	57 kg (126 lb)	28 July 1990	Almaty, Kazakh SSR, Soviet Union	(Russia) Fakel Chelyabinsk
11	F	Marina Sergina	1.68 m (5 ft 6 in)	68 kg (150 lb)	2 March 1986	Polyarnye Zori, Soviet Union	(Russia) Tornado Dmitrov
13	D	Kristina Petrovskaya	1.70 m (5 ft 7 in)	64 kg (141 lb)	3 June 1980	Moscow, Soviet Union	(Russia) Tornado Dmitrov
15	D	Olga Permyakova – A	1.71 m (5 ft 7 in)	67 kg (148 lb)	12 April 1982	Chelyabinsk, Soviet Union	(Russia) Tornado Dmitrov
17	F	Yekaterina Smolentseva – C	1.76 m (5 ft 9 in)	65 kg (143 lb)	15 September 1981	Pervouralsk, Soviet Union	(Russia) Tornado Dmitrov
20	G	Irina Gashennikova	1.64 m (5 ft 5 in)	66 kg (146 lb)	11 May 1975	Pushkino, Soviet Union	(Russia) Tornado Dmitrov
22	F	Yulia Deulina	1.73 m (5 ft 8 in)	62 kg (137 lb)	14 April 1984	Krasnogorsk, Soviet Union	(Russia) SKIF Nizhny Novgorod
23	F	Tatiana Burina	1.65 m (5 ft 5 in)	70 kg (150 lb)	20 March 1980	Novosibirsk, Soviet Union	(Russia) Tornado Dmitrov
25	F	Yekaterina Lebedeva	1.66 m (5 ft 5 in)	66 kg (146 lb)	14 September 1989	Sverdlovsk, Soviet Union	(Russia) Dinamo Yekaterinburg
26	D	Zoya Polunina	1.70 m (5 ft 7 in)	65 kg (143 lb)	12 June 1991	Bogoroditsk, Soviet Union	(Russia) Tornado Dmitrov
28	F	Svetlana Terentieva	1.63 m (5 ft 4 in)	69 kg (152 lb)	25 September 1983	Pervouralsk, Soviet Union	(Russia) SKIF Nizhny Novgorod
29	F	Tatiana Sotnikova	1.67 m (5 ft 6 in)	59 kg (130 lb)	20 January 1981	Moscow, Soviet Union	(Russia) SKIF Nizhny Novgorod
30	G	Mariya Onolbayeva	1.78 m (5 ft 10 in)	78 kg (172 lb)	25 December 1978	Murmansk, Soviet Union	(Russia) Fakel Chelyabinsk
34	D	Svetlana Tkacheva	1.70 m (5 ft 7 in)	63 kg (139 lb)	3 November 1984	Moscow, Soviet Union	(Russia) SKIF Nizhny Novgorod
44	D	Alexandra Kapustina	1.66 m (5 ft 5 in)	74 kg (163 lb)	7 April 1984	Pervouralsk, Soviet Union	(Russia) SKIF Nizhny Novgorod
91	F	Yekaterina Ananina	1.72 m (5 ft 8 in)	62 kg (137 lb)	13 June 1991	Sverdlovsk, Soviet Union	(Russia) Spartak-Merkury Yekaterinburg
95	D	Inna Dyubanok	1.66 m (5 ft 5 in)	63 kg (139 lb)	20 February 1990	Mozhaysk, Soviet Union	(Russia) Tornado Dmitrov

== Junior's ==
=== 2010 World U18 Championship ===
The following is the Russian roster in the junior's ice hockey tournament of the 2010 IIHF World U18 Championships.

No.	Pos.	Name	Height	Weight	Birthdate	Birthplace	Team
1	G	Sergey Kostenko	180 cm (5 ft 11 in)	75 kg (165 lb)	17 Sep 1992	unknown	Metallurg Novokuznetsk (KHL)
30	G	Andrei Vasilevsky	188 cm (6 ft 2 in)	83 kg (183 lb)	27 Jul 1994	Tyumen	Salavat Yulayev Ufa (KHL)
2	D	Stefan Stepanov	184 cm (6 ft 0 in)	77 kg (170 lb)	23 Sep 1992	unknown	MHC Krylya Sovetov (MHL)
4	D	Viktor Antipin	174 cm (5 ft 9 in)	66 kg (146 lb)	6 Dec 1992	unknown	Metallurg Magnitogorsk (KHL)
16	D	Nikita Nesterov	183 cm (6 ft 0 in)	75 kg (165 lb)	28 Mar 1993	unknown	Traktor Chelyabinsk (KHL)
7	D	Efim Gurkin	183 cm (6 ft 0 in)	75 kg (165 lb)	13 Nov 1992	unknown	Salavat Yulayev Ufa (KHL)
12	D	Grigori Zheldakov	184 cm (6 ft 0 in)	87 kg (192 lb)	11 Feb 1992	unknown	HC Spartak Moscow (KHL)
3	D	Albert Yarullin	175 cm (5 ft 9 in)	69 kg (152 lb)	3 May 1993	unknown	Ak Bars Kazan (KHL)
24	D	Zakhar Arzamastsev	183 cm (6 ft 0 in)	81 kg (179 lb)	6 Nov 1992	unknown	Metallurg Novokuznetsk (KHL)
8	F	Vladislav Namestnikov	177 cm (5 ft 10 in)	67 kg (148 lb)	22 Nov 1992	unknown	Khimik Voskresensk (KHL)
9	F	Roman Berdnikov	180 cm (5 ft 11 in)	80 kg (180 lb)	18 Jul 1992	unknown	Owen Sound Attack (OHL)
11	F	Vladislav Kartayev	186 cm (6 ft 1 in)	75 kg (165 lb)	10 Feb 1992	unknown	Salavat Yulayev Ufa (KHL)
13	F	Roman Lyubimov	185 cm (6 ft 1 in)	80 kg (180 lb)	1 Jun 1992	unknown	CSKA Moscow (KHL)
14	F	Daniil Apalkov	179 cm (5 ft 10 in)	78 kg (172 lb)	1 Jan 1992	unknown	Metallurg Magnitogorsk (KHL)
17	F	Maxim Shalunov	190 cm (6 ft 3 in)	84 kg (185 lb)	31 Jan 1993	unknown	Traktor Chelyabinsk (KHL)
18	F	Evgeni Grigorenko	173 cm (5 ft 8 in)	70 kg (150 lb)	11 Aug 1992	unknown	Metallurg Magnitogorsk (KHL)
22	F	Sergei Barbashev	180 cm (5 ft 11 in)	73 kg (161 lb)	26 Jul 1992	unknown	CSKA Moscow (KHL)
26	F	Gleb Zyryanov	192 cm (6 ft 4 in)	84 kg (185 lb)	16 Apr 1992	unknown	Torpedo Nizhny Novgorod (KHL)
25	F	Evgeny Kuznetsov	184 cm (6 ft 0 in)	79 kg (174 lb)	19 May 1992	Chelyabinsk	Traktor Chelyabinsk (KHL)
27	F	Emil Galimov	183 cm (6 ft 0 in)	72 kg (159 lb)	9 May 1992	unknown	HC Neftekhimik Nizhnekamsk (KHL)
