= Ice hockey at the 2014 Winter Olympics – Women's tournament =

Women's ice hockey at the XXII Olympic Winter Games
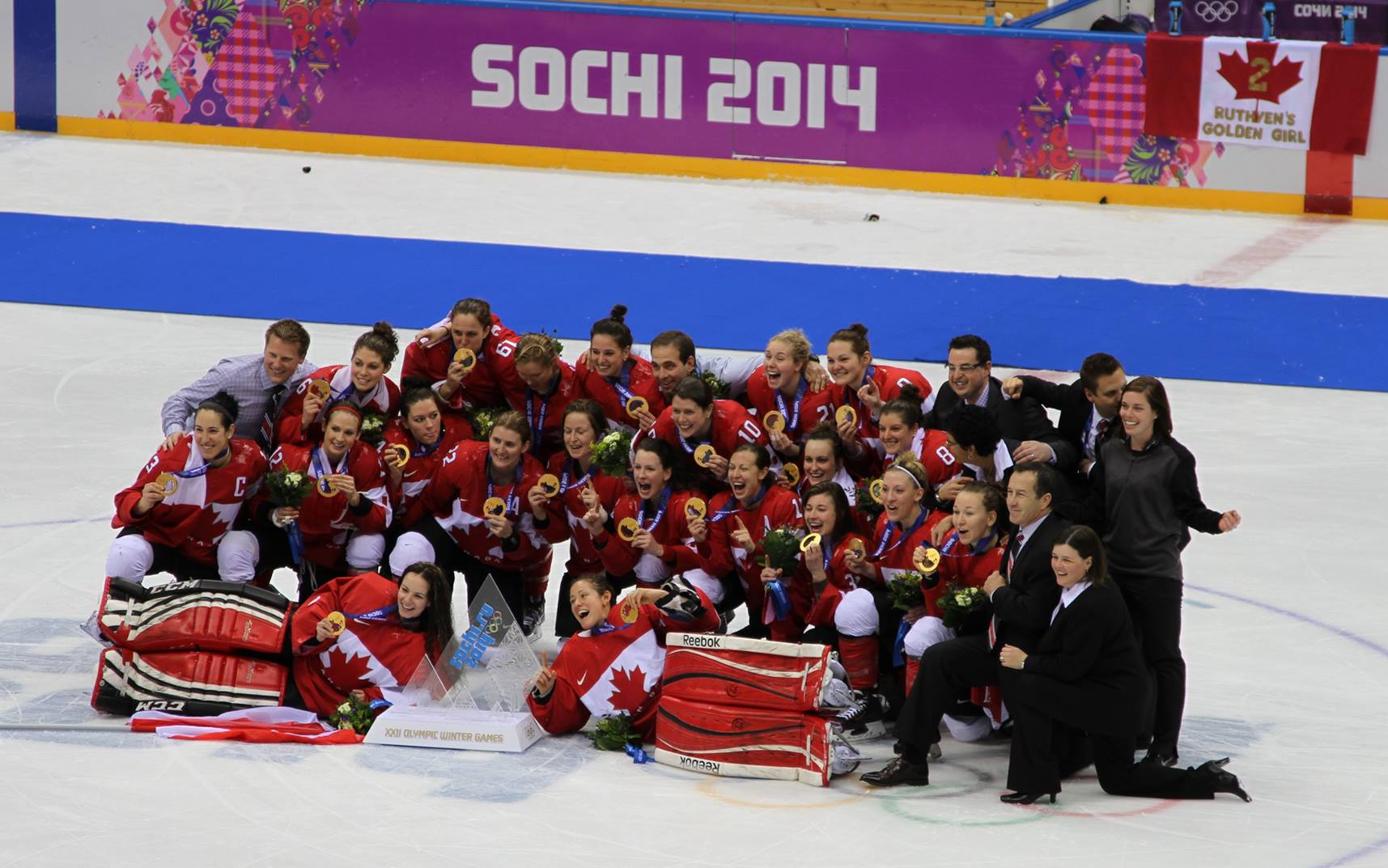
- The gold medal winners pose for a team picture
- Venues: Bolshoy Ice Dome; Shayba Arena
- Dates: 8–20 February 2014
- Competitors: 168 from 8 nations

Medalists
1st place, gold medalist(s)		Canada (4th title)
2nd place, silver medalist(s)		United States
3rd place, bronze medalist(s)		Switzerland

The women's tournament in ice hockey at the 2014 Winter Olympics was held in Sochi, Russia.

For the first time, the women's gold medal game was decided in overtime, with Canada defeating the United States 3–2. Switzerland defeated Sweden for their first Olympic ice hockey medal in 66 years, and first medal in the women's tournament.

With the win, the Canadian women's national ice hockey team won its fourth consecutive gold medal, a feat only previously accomplished by the Soviet Union men's team in 1964–76, and the Canadian men's team in 1920–32. Canadians Hayley Wickenheiser, Jayna Hefford and Caroline Ouellette became the first hockey players to win four Olympic gold medals. They also joined Soviet biathlete Alexander Tikhonov and German speed skater Claudia Pechstein as the only athletes to win gold medals in four straight Winter Olympics.

On 6 December 2017, nearly four years after the tournament was played, six players from the Russian national team (Inna Dyubanok, Yekaterina Lebedeva, Yekaterina Pashkevich, Anna Shibanova, Yekaterina Smolentseva, and Galina Skiba) were subjected to sanctions, and the team was disqualified by the International Olympic Committee (IOC) based on findings from the reanalysis of doping samples collected from Russian athletes at the 2014 Winter Games by the Oswald Commission. Ten days later, Tatiana Burina and Anna Shukina were also sanctioned and the International Ice Hockey Federation (IIHF) was directed to modify results accordingly. All eight of the players were "declared ineligible to be accredited in any capacity for all editions of the Games of the Olympiad and the Olympic Winter Games subsequent to the Olympic Winter Games Sochi 2014" and "disqualified from the events in which they participated" by the IOC. The players registered their appeals with the Court of Arbitration for Sport (CAS) and, in 2018, five of the eight players (Lebedeva, Pashkevich, Smolentseva, Burina, and Shukina) won their appeals, the sanctions against them were annulled and their results were reinstated. The sanctions against Inna Dyubanok, Anna Shibanova, and Galina Skiba were partially upheld, though the life-ban on Olympic competition was lifted, and the disqualification of the team was maintained on account of their violations.

== Qualification ==
Russia qualified as the host. Canada, the United States, Finland, Switzerland, and Sweden qualified as the top five teams in the IIHF World Ranking. Germany and Japan qualified via the qualification tournament.

== Rosters ==
Group A	Group B
Canada; Finland; Switzerland; United States	Russia; Sweden; Germany; Japan

== Officials ==
The IIHF selected six referees and nine linesmen to work the 2014 Winter Olympics. They were the following:

Referees

- (United States) Erin Blair
- (Canada) Melanie Bordeleau
- (Canada) Jay Cheverton
- (Finland) Anna Eskola
- (Germany) Nicole Hertrich
- (Norway) Aina Hove
- (United States) Jack Long
- (United Kingdom) Joy Tottman

Linesmen

- (Sweden) Therese Bjorkman
- (Canada) Denise Caughey
- (Canada) Stephanie Gagnon
- (France) Charlotte Girard
- (United States) Alicia Hanrahan
- (United States) Laura Johnson
- (Slovakia) Michaela Kúdeľová
- (Czech Republic) Ilona Novotná
- (Czech Republic) Zuzana Svobodová

== Preliminary round ==
=== Format ===
The top four teams based on the 2012 IIHF World Ranking, Canada, United States, Finland and Switzerland, competed in Group A, while the remaining four teams competed in Group B. The top two teams in Group A received a bye to the semifinals. In the quarterfinals, the third place team in Group A played the second place team in Group B, while the fourth placed team in Group A played the first place team in Group B. The winners advanced to the semifinals, while the two losers, and the third and fourth placed teams in Group B, competed in a classification bracket for places five through eight. This format has been used since the 2012 World Championship.

=== Tiebreak criteria ===
In each group, teams were ranked according to the following criteria:

1. Number of points (three points for a regulation-time win, two points for an overtime or shootout win, one point for an overtime or shootout defeat, no points for a regulation-time defeat);
2. In case two teams are tied on points, the result of their head-to-head match will determine the ranking;
3. In case three or four teams are tied on points, the following criteria will apply (if, after applying a criterion, only two teams remain tied, the result of their head-to-head match will determine their ranking):
  1. Points obtained in head-to-head matches between the teams concerned;
  2. Goal differential in head-to-head matches between the teams concerned;
  3. Number of goals scored in head-to-head matches between the teams concerned;
  4. If three teams remain tied, result of head-to-head matches between each of the teams concerned and the remaining team in the group (points, goal difference, goals scored);
  5. Place in 2012 IIHF World Ranking.

All times are local (UTC+4).

=== Group A ===
Team	Pld	W	OTW	OTL	L	GF	GA	GD	Pts	Qualification
Canada	3	3	0	0	0	11	2	+9	9	Semifinals
United States	3	2	0	0	1	14	4	+10	6	Semifinals
Finland	3	0	1	0	2	5	9	−4	2	Quarterfinals
Switzerland	3	0	0	1	2	3	18	−15	1	Quarterfinals

Source: IIHF

8 February 2014; 12:00	United States	3–1 (1–0, 2–0, 0–1)	Finland	Shayba Arena, Sochi; Attendance: 4,135

Game reference

Jessie Vetter
Goalies
Noora Räty
Referee:
(Germany) Nicole Hertrich
Linesmen:
(Sweden) Therese Bjorkman
(Canada) Stephanie Gagnon

H. Knight – 00:53	1–0
K. Stack (H. Knight, M. Bozek) – 27:42	2–0
A. Carpenter (A. Schleper) (PP) – 35:59	3–0
	3–1	55:22 – S. Tapani (M. Karvinen) (PP)

4 min
Penalties
8 min
43
Shots
15

8 February 2014; 17:00	Canada	5–0 (2–0, 3–0, 0–0)	Switzerland	Shayba Arena, Sochi; Attendance: 4,386

Game reference

Charline Labonté
Goalies
Florence Schelling
Referee:
(Norway) Aina Hove
Linesmen:
(United States) Alicia Hanrahan
(Slovakia) Michaela Kúdelová

J. Larocque (N. Spooner) – 01:25	1–0
T. Watchorn (R. Johnston) – 06:30	2–0
H. Wickenheiser (SH) – 23:54	3–0
M-P. Poulin (J. Hefford, R. Johnston) – 32:28	4–0
R. Johnston (M-P. Poulin) – 36:10	5–0

2 min
Penalties
4 min
69
Shots
14

10 February 2014; 14:00	United States	9–0 (5–0, 1–0, 3–0)	Switzerland	Shayba Arena, Sochi; Attendance: 3,812

Game reference

Molly Schaus
Goalies
Florence Schelling
Referee:
(Canada) Melanie Bordeleau
Linesmen:
(Canada) Denise Caughey
(France) Charlotte Girard

M. Lamoureux (J. Lamoureux, M. Duggan) – 09:20	1–0
B. Decker (A. Kessel, H. Knight) – 10:07	2–0
A. Kessel (K. Coyne) – 10:15	3–0
H. Knight (K. Stack, J. Chu) – 14:23	4–0
A. Kessel (B. Decker, K. Coyne) (PP) – 15:42	5–0
M. Lamoureux (J. Lamoureux, L. Stecklein) – 33:26	6–0
K. Coyne (K. Stack) – 40:49	7–0
K. Coyne (A. Kessel, M. Bozek) – 43:59	8–0
A. Carpenter (J. Pucci) – 55:39	9–0

4 min
Penalties
8 min
53
Shots
10

10 February 2014; 19:00	Finland	0–3 (0–0, 0–0, 0–3)	Canada	Shayba Arena, Sochi; Attendance: 4,837

Game reference

Noora Räty
Goalies
Shannon Szabados
Referee:
(United Kingdom) Joy Tottman
Linesmen:
(Sweden) Therese Bjorkman
(United States) Laura Johnson

0–1	49:27 – M. Agosta-Marciano (PP)
0–2	52:24 – J. Hefford
0–3	56:36 – R. Johnston (J. Hefford, M-P. Poulin)

10 min
Penalties
12 min
14
Shots
42

12 February 2014; 12:00	Switzerland	3–4 OT (0–2, 2–1, 1–0) (OT 0–1)	Finland	Shayba Arena, Sochi; Attendance: 4,211

Game reference

Florence Schelling
Goalies
Noora Räty
Referee:
(United States) Erin Blair
Linesmen:
(United States) Laura Johnson
(Slovakia) Michaela Kúdelová

	0–1	07:56 – J. Hiirikoski (M. Jalosuo, M. Karvinen)
	0–2	09:55 – M. Karvinen, (S. Tapani, A. Kilponen)
23:28 – R. Eggimann (N. Bullo)	1–2
28:00 – P. Stanz (J. Lutz) (PP)	2–2
	2–3	35:31 – M. Karvinen (S. Tapani, J. Hiirikoski) (PP)
56:25 – S. Marty (N. Bullo) (PP)	3–3
	3–4	62:38 – J. Hiirikoski (L. Välimäki, A. Kilponen)

31 min
Penalties
12 min
27
Shots
34

12 February 2014; 16:30	Canada	3–2 (0–0, 0–1, 3–1)	United States	Shayba Arena, Sochi; Attendance: 4,812

Game reference

Charline Labonté
Goalies
Jessica Vetter
Referee:
(Finland) Anna Eskola
Linesmen:
(Czech Republic) Ilona Novotná
(Czech Republic) Zuzana Svobodová

	0–1	37:34 – H. Knight (A. Carpenter, A. Schleper) (PP)
M. Agosta-Marciano (H. Wickenheiser) (PP) – 42:24	1–1
H. Wickenheiser (N. Spooner, M. Agosta-Marciano) – 43:54	2–1
M. Agosta-Marciano – 54:55	3–1
	3–2	58:55 – A. Schleper

8 min
Penalties
10 min
31
Shots
27

=== Group B ===
Team	Pld	W	OTW	OTL	L	GF	GA	GD	Pts	Qualification
Russia	3	3	0	0	0	9	3	+6	9	Quarterfinals
Sweden	3	2	0	0	1	6	3	+3	6	Quarterfinals
Germany	3	1	0	0	2	5	8	−3	3	5–8th place semifinals
Japan	3	0	0	0	3	1	7	−6	0	5–8th place semifinals

Source: IIHF

9 February 2014; 12:00	Sweden	1–0 (1–0, 0–0, 0–0)	Japan	Shayba Arena, Sochi; Attendance: 2,928

Game reference
Valentina Wallner	Goalies	Nana Fujimoto	Referee: (United States) Erin Blair; Linesmen: (France) Charlotte Girard (Czech Republic) Zuzana Svobodová
J. Asserholt (E. Eliasson, E. Grahm) (PP) – 12:38 / 1–0			Referee: (United States) Erin Blair; Linesmen: (France) Charlotte Girard (Czech Republic) Zuzana Svobodová
8 min	Penalties	4 min	Referee: (United States) Erin Blair; Linesmen: (France) Charlotte Girard (Czech Republic) Zuzana Svobodová
23	Shots	19	Referee: (United States) Erin Blair; Linesmen: (France) Charlotte Girard (Czech Republic) Zuzana Svobodová

9 February 2014; 17:00	Russia	4–1 (0–0, 0–1, 4–0)	Germany	Shayba Arena, Sochi; Attendance: 5,048

Game reference

Yulia Leskina
Goalies
Viona Harrer
Referee:
(Finland) Anna Eskola
Linesmen:
(United States) Laura Johnson
(Czech Republic) Ilona Novotná

	0–1	26:48 – F. Busch (M. Anwander)
I. Gavrilova (A. Khomich, Y. Smolentseva) – 45:04	1–1
O. Sosina (I. Dyubanok, T. Burina) (PP) – 48:49	2–1
Y. Smolentseva (A. Shibanova) – 49:27	3–1
O. Sosina (I. Dyubanok, Y. Smolentseva) – 52:15	4–1

4 min
Penalties
8 min
37
Shots
15

11 February 2014; 14:00	Germany	0–4 (0–1, 0–0, 0–3)	Sweden	Shayba Arena, Sochi; Attendance: 4,015

Game reference

Jennifer Harß
Goalies
Kim Martin Hasson
Referee:
(Norway) Aina Hove
Linesmen:
(Canada) Stephanie Gagnon
(Slovakia) Michaela Kúdelová

0–1	01:00 – E. Nordin (E. Eliasson, E. Grahm)
0–2	47:42 – C. Östberg (A. Borgqvist)
0–3	50:31 – J. Olofsson (C. Östberg, M. Löwenhielm)
0–4	51:35 – P. Winberg (A. Borgqvist)

4 min
Penalties
10 min
21
Shots
29

11 February 2014; 19:00	Russia	2–1 (1–0, 0–0, 1–1)	Japan	Shayba Arena, Sochi; Attendance: 4,897

Game reference

Anna Prugova
Goalies
Nana Fujimoto
Referee:
(Germany) Nicole Hertrich
Linesmen:
(Canada) Denise Caughey
(United States) Alicia Hanrahan

T. Burina – 11:39	1–0
	1–1	40:33 – A. Toko (H. Kubo)
A. Vafina (SH) – 51:36	2–1

6 min
Penalties
6 min
38
Shots
22

13 February 2014; 12:00	Japan	0–4 (0–1, 0–1, 0–2)	Germany	Shayba Arena, Sochi; Attendance: 2,618

Game reference

Nana Fujimoto
Goalies
Viona Harrer
Referee:
(Canada) Melanie Bordeleau
Linesmen:
(Sweden) Therese Bjorkman
(France) Carlotte Girard

0–1	13:23 – M. Anwander (S. Kratzer, M. Becker) (PP)
0–2	20:48 – F. Busch (A. Lanzl)
0–3	58:31 – K. Spielberger (T. Eisenschmid, N. Kamenik)
0–4	59:28 – F. Busch (S. Gotz)

8 min
Penalties
10 min
30
Shots
25

13 February 2014; 21:00	Sweden	1–3 (0–1, 1–1, 0–1)	Russia	Shayba Arena, Sochi; Attendance: 5,092

Game reference

Valentina Wallner
Goalies
Anna Prugova
Referee:
(United Kingdom) Joy Tottman
Linesmen:
(Canada) Stephanie Gagnon
(United States) Alicia Hanrahan

	0–1	08:38 – A. Shukina (Y. Pashkevich, A. Shokhina)
	0–2	29:20 – A. Khomich (Y. Smolina)
P. Winberg – 38:58	1–2
	1–3	58:07 – Y. Smolentseva (O. Sosina)

14 min
Penalties
4 min
16
Shots
31

== Final round ==
=== Bracket ===
Quarterfinals
A4	Switzerland	2
B1	Russia	0
A3	Finland	2
B2	Sweden	4

Semifinals
A1	Canada	3
A4	Switzerland	1
A2	United States	6
B2	Sweden	1

Gold medal game
A1	Canada †	3
A2	United States	2
Bronze medal game
A4	Switzerland	4
B2	Sweden	3

† Indicates overtime victory
‡ Indicates shootout victory

=== Quarterfinals ===
The top two teams (A1–A2) received byes and were deemed the home team in the semifinals as they were seeded to advance.

15 February 2014; 12:00	Finland	2–4 (0–0, 1–0, 1–4)	Sweden	Shayba Arena, Sochi; Attendance: 2,917

Game reference

Noora Räty
Goalies
Valentina Wallner
Referee:
(Germany) Nicole Hertrich
Linesmen:
(Canada) Stephanie Gagnon
(United States) Laura Johnson

V. Hovi (L. Välimäki) – 33:16	1–0
	1–1	40:48 – A. Borgqvist (PP)
	1–2	45:09 – L. Wester (J. Asserholt, P. Winberg)
E. Nuutinen (K. Rantamäki, R. Lindstedt) – 45:21	2–2
	2–3	55:45 – E. Eliasson (M. Löwenhielm, E. Grahm) (PP)
	2–4	59:19 – E. Nordin (P. Winberg) (EN)

12 min
Penalties
10 min
31
Shots
32

15 February 2014; 16:30	Switzerland	2–0 (1–0, 0–0, 1–0)	Russia	Shayba Arena, Sochi; Attendance: 4,962

Game reference
Florence Schelling	Goalies	Anna Prugova	Referee: (United Kingdom) Joy Tottman; Linesmen: (Sweden) Therese Bjorkman (Canada) Denise Caughey
S. Marty (A. Müller, S. Thalmann) – 10:46 / 1–0; L. Stalder (N. Bullo) (ENG) – 59:39 / 2–0			Referee: (United Kingdom) Joy Tottman; Linesmen: (Sweden) Therese Bjorkman (Canada) Denise Caughey
8 min	Penalties	2 min	Referee: (United Kingdom) Joy Tottman; Linesmen: (Sweden) Therese Bjorkman (Canada) Denise Caughey
27	Shots	41	Referee: (United Kingdom) Joy Tottman; Linesmen: (Sweden) Therese Bjorkman (Canada) Denise Caughey

=== Semifinals ===
Teams seeded A1 and A2 were the home teams.

17 February 2014; 16:30	United States	6–1 (3–0, 2–0, 1–1)	Sweden	Shayba Arena, Sochi; Attendance: 4,542

Game reference

Jessie Vetter
Goalies
Valentina Lizana Wallner
Kim Martin Hasson
Referee:
(Canada) Melanie Bordeleau
Linesmen:
(Canada) Denise Caughey
(Czech Republic) Zuzana Svobodová

A. Carpenter (M. Bozek, K. Stack) (PP) – 06:10	1–0
K. Bellamy (B. Decker, M. Bozek) – 07:16	2–0
A. Kessel (B. Decker, G. Marvin) – 11:19	3–0
M. Lamoureux (J. Lamoureux, K. Bellamy) (PP) – 25:41	4-0
M. Bozek (K. Coyne) – 32:17	5–0
	5–1	53:04 – A. Borgqvist (E. Eliasson, P. Winberg)
B. Decker (K. Coyne, A. Kessel) – 56:58	6–1

6 min
Penalties
8 min
70
Shots
9

17 February 2014; 21:00	Canada	3–1 (3–0, 0–1, 0–0)	Switzerland	Shayba Arena, Sochi; Attendance: 3,378

Game reference

Shannon Szabados
Goalies
Florence Schelling
Referee:
(United States) Erin Blair
Linesmen:
(United States) Alicia Hanrahan
(Czech Republic) Ilona Novotná

N. Spooner (H. Wickenheiser) – 07:29	1–0
N. Spooner (C. Ward, H. Wickenheiser) (PP) – 11:10	2–0
M. Daoust (J. Wakefield) – 11:33	3–0
	3–1	25:14 – J. Lutz (S. Benz, L. Benz) (PP)

12 min
Penalties
10 min
48
Shots
22

=== Bronze medal game ===
20 February 2014; 16:00	(bronze) Switzerland	4–3 (0–1, 0–1, 4–1)	Sweden	Bolshoy Ice Dome, Sochi; Attendance: 8,263

Game reference

Florence Schelling
Goalies
Valentina Lizana Wallner
Referee:
(Germany) Nicole Hertrich
Linesmen:
(Canada) Denise Caughey
(United States) Alicia Hanrahan

	0–1	14:00 – M. Löwenhielm (M. Lindh, C. Östberg)
	0–2	38:58 – E. Johansson (C. Östberg)
S. Benz (S. Forster) – 41:18	1–2
P. Stanz (A. Müller) (PP) – 46:13	2–2
J. Lutz (L. Stalder, L. Benz) – 53:43	3–2
A. Müller (ENG) – 58:53	4–2
	4–3	59:16 – P. Winberg (J. Asserholt, E. Grahm) (EA)

10 min
Penalties
4 min
26
Shots
31

=== Gold medal game ===
20 February 2014; 21:00	(gold) Canada	3–2 OT (0–0, 0–1, 2–1) (OT 1–0)	United States (silver)	Bolshoy Ice Dome, Sochi; Attendance: 10,639

Game reference

Shannon Szabados
Goalies
Jessie Vetter
Referee:
(United Kingdom) Joy Tottman
Linesmen:
(Czech Republic) Ilona Novotná
(Czech Republic) Zuzana Svobodová

	0–1	31:57 – M. Duggan (J. Lamoureux)
	0–2	42:01 – A. Carpenter (H. Knight, K. Stack)
B. Jenner (M. Mikkelson, J. Larocque) – 56:34	1–2
M-P. Poulin (R. Johnston, H. Irwin) (EA) – 59:05	2–2
M-P. Poulin (L. Fortino) (PP2) – 68:10	3–2

10 min
Penalties
14 min
31
Shots
29

=== 5–8th place bracket ===
5–8th place semifinals
Finland	2
Germany	1
Russia	6
Japan	3

Fifth place game
Finland	4
Russia	0
Seventh place game
Germany	3
Japan	2

=== 5–8th place semifinals ===
16 February 2014; 12:00	Finland	2–1 (2–0, 0–1, 0–0)	Germany	Shayba Arena, Sochi; Attendance: 2,009

Game reference

Noora Räty
Goalies
Jennifer Harß
Referee:
(Norway) Aina Hove
Linesmen:
(Slovakia) Michaela Kúdeľová
(Czech Republic) Zuzana Svobodová

J. Hiirikoski (R. Välilä) (PP) – 01:15	1–0
M. Karvinen (R. Välilä, S. Tapani) – 08:32	2–0
	2–1	28:59 – B. Evers (S. Götz) (PP)

8 min
Penalties
8 min
27
Shots
21

16 February 2014; 21:00	Russia	6–3 (1–0, 3–2, 2–1)	Japan	Shayba Arena, Sochi; Attendance: 4,793

Game reference

Anna Prugova
Yulia Leskina
Goalies
Nana Fujimoto
Referee:
(Finland) Anna Eskola
Linesmen:
(France) Charlotte Girard
(Czech Republic) Ilona Novotná

A. Shukina (A. Shokhina) – 16:12	1–0
	1–1	26:14 – T. Yamane (R. Ukita)
A. Shokhina (Y. Smolentseva) – 26:44	2–1
	2–2	26:50 – A. Toko (H. Kubo)
G. Skiba (I. Gavrilova, T. Burina) – 27:33	3–2
O. Sosina (Y. Smolentseva, A. Shokhina) (PP) – 31:32	4–2
	4–3	42:23 – C. Osawa (T. Yamane, Y. Hirano)
G. Skiba (T. Burina, I. Gavrilova) (PP) – 49:39	5–3
T. Burina (A. Shibanova, A. Khomich) (PP) – 55:42	6–3

6 min
Penalties
10 min
32
Shots
27

=== Seventh place game ===
18 February 2014; 12:00	Germany	3–2 (1–1, 2–0, 0–1)	Japan	Shayba Arena, Sochi; Attendance: 2,012

Game reference

Viona Harrer
Goalies
Nana Fujimoto
Akane Konishi
Referee:
(Canada) Melanie Bordeleau
Linesmen:
(Sweden) Therese Bjorkman
(Slovakia) Michaela Kúdeľová

S. Götz (F. Busch, J. Janzen) (PP) – 09:18	1–0
	1–1	13:04 – H. Kubo (C. Osawa)
J. Zorn (F. Busch, S. Götz) – (PP) 24:30	2–1
S. Seiler (L. Schuster, S. Kratzer) – 35:49	3–1
	3–2	42:56 – H. Yoneyama (H. Kubo, S. Suzuki)

8 min
Penalties
12 min
23
Shots
29

=== Fifth place game ===
18 February 2014; 16:30	Finland	4–0 (2–0, 0–0, 2–0)	Russia	Shayba Arena, Sochi; Attendance: 4,112

Game reference

Noora Räty
Goalies
Anna Prugova
Referee:
(United States) Erin Blair
Linesmen:
(Canada) Stephanie Gagnon
(United States) Laura Johnson

L. Välimäki (K. Rantamäki, V. Hovi) – 16:37	1–0
R. Välilä (S. Tapani, J. Hiirikoski) – 17:28	2–0
M. Karvinen (R. Välilä, S. Tarkki) – 42:30	3–0
M. Karvinen (R. Välilä, M. Tuominen) (PP) – 43:31	4–0

14 min
Penalties
12 min
29
Shots
19

== Final rankings ==
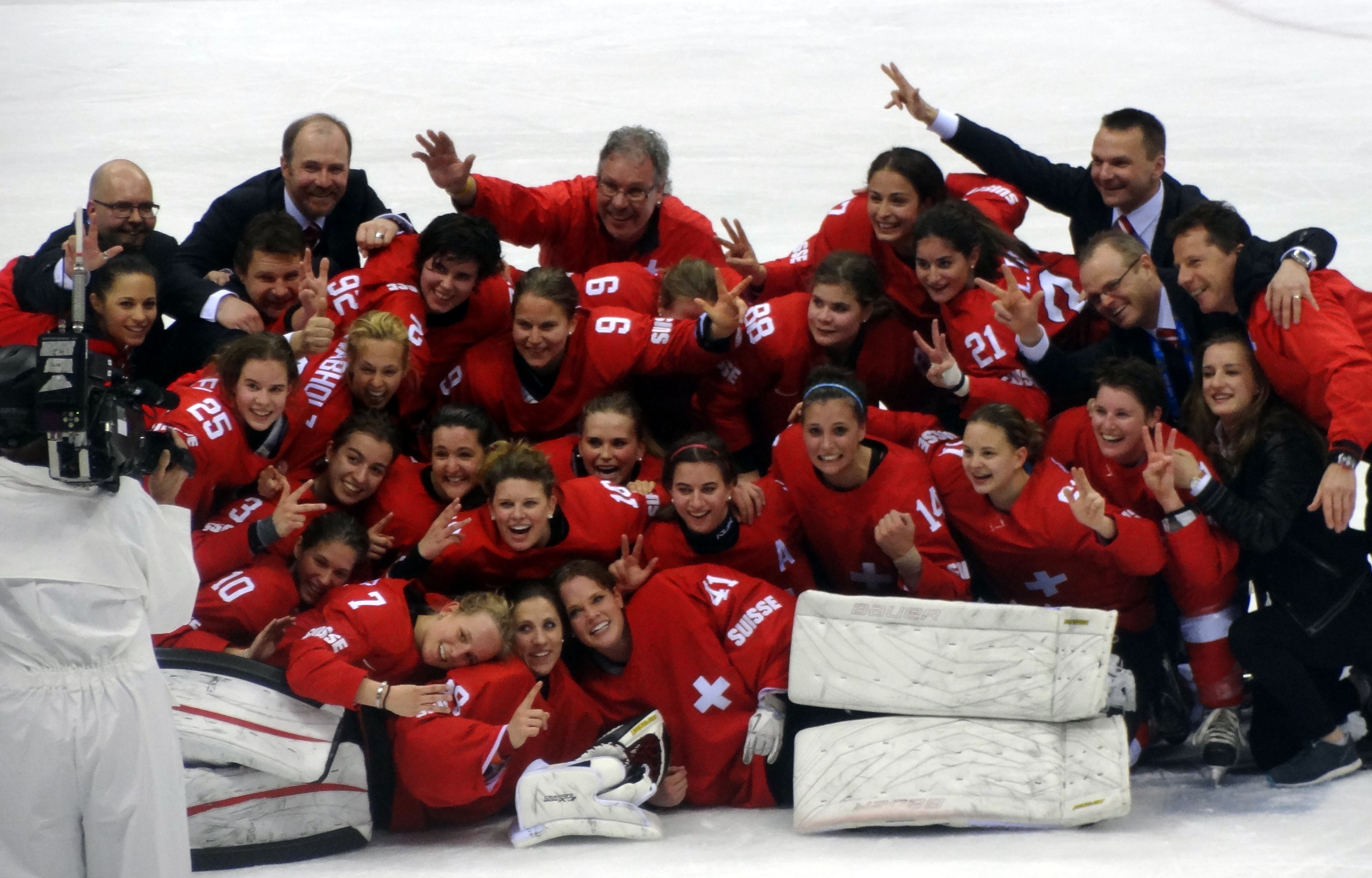
The Swiss team celebrates shortly after winning the bronze medal at the 2014 Winter Olympics

The final rankings of the 2014 Winter Olympics Women's Ice Hockey Tournament are as follows:

Rank	Team
1st place, gold medalist(s)	Canada
2nd place, silver medalist(s)	United States
3rd place, bronze medalist(s)	Switzerland
4	Sweden
5	Finland
6	Germany
7	Japan
DSQ	~~Russia~~

The Russian team was disqualified for the doping. The IIHF was requested by the IOC to modify their results, and the 6th and 7th place were reallocated.

== Statistics ==
=== Scoring leaders ===
List shows the top skaters sorted by points, then goals.

Player	GP	G	A	Pts	+/−	PIM	POS
(Finland) Michelle Karvinen	6	5	2	7	+4	4	F
(Sweden) Pernilla Winberg	6	3	4	7	+3	2	F
(United States) Amanda Kessel	5	3	3	6	+8	0	F
(United States) Hilary Knight	5	3	3	6	+1	6	F
(United States) Kendall Coyne	5	2	4	6	+8	2	F
(United States) Brianna Decker	5	2	4	6	+8	6	F
(Russia) Yekaterina Smolentseva	5	2	4	6	0	2	F
(United States) Alexandra Carpenter	5	4	1	5	−1	2	F
(Germany) Franziska Busch	5	3	2	5	−4	2	F
(Canada) Marie-Philip Poulin	5	3	2	5	+6	0	F

GP = Games played; G = Goals; A = Assists; Pts = Points; +/− = Plus/minus; PIM = Penalties in minutes; POS = Position
Source: IIHF.com

=== Leading goaltenders ===
Only the top five goaltenders, based on save percentage, who have played at least 40% of their team's minutes, are included in this list.

Player	TOI	GA	GAA	SA	Sv%	SO
(Canada) Shannon Szabados	187:30	3	0.96	65	95.38	1
(Germany) Viona Harrer	180:00	6	2.00	96	93.75	1
(Finland) Noora Räty	358:57	13	2.17	183	92.90	1
(Sweden) Valentina Wallner	269:16	13	2.90	152	91.45	1
(Russia) Anna Prugova	265:46	9	2.03	105	91.43	0

TOI = Time on ice (minutes:seconds); SA = Shots against; GA = Goals against; GAA = Goals against average; Sv% = Save percentage; SO = Shutouts
Source: IIHF.com

== Tournament awards ==
- Media All-Stars
  - Goaltender: Florence Schelling (SUI)
  - Defence: Megan Bozek (USA), Jenni Hiirikoski (FIN)
  - Forwards: Amanda Kessel (USA), Meghan Agosta-Marciano (CAN), Hilary Knight (USA)
- Most Valuable Player: Florence Schelling (SUI)
- Individual Awards as selected by the Tournament Directorate
  - Best Goaltender: Florence Schelling (SUI)
  - Best Defenceman: Jenni Hiirikoski (FIN)
  - Best Forward: Michelle Karvinen (FIN)
