= 2019–20 ZhHL season =

5th season of the Zhenskaya Hockey League

- League: Zhenskaya Hockey League
- Sport: Ice hockey
- Duration: 13 September 2019 – 00 March 2020
- Games: 28
- Teams: 8
- TV partner(s): KHL TV; YouTube

Regular Season
- Season champions: Agidel Ufa
- Runners-up: KRS Vanke Rays
- Top scorer: Alex Carpenter (Vanke Rays)

Playoffs

Finals
- Champions: KRS Vanke Rays
- Runners-up: Agidel Ufa

Seasons
- 2020–21

The 2019–20 ZhHL season was the fifth season of the Zhenskaya Hockey League since the league’s was created in 2015. It was the 25th season of the women's ice hockey Russian Championship.

== League business ==
=== Team changes ===
On 25 July 2019, the Shenzhen KRS Vanke Rays announced they would be joining the ZhHL for the 2019–20 season. The addition of Shenzhen, formerly of the Canadian Women's Hockey League (CWHL), marked a significant expansion for the league, bringing the total number of teams to eight and introducing several high-profile international players to the ZhHL. The team hired former North Dakota head coach Brian Idalski, while retaining veteran players Alex Carpenter, Noora Räty, and Rachel Llanes.

=== Schedule ===
The season began on 3 September 2019 and ran through 8 March 2020.

=== Broadcasting ===
The league streamed many games on its official YouTube channel. In Russia, select games were also aired on the KHL TV channel.

== Teams ==
Team name	Location	Home venue	Head coach	Captain
Agidel	(Russia) Ufa	Ice Palace Salavat Yulaev	Denis Afinogenov	Maria Pechnikova
Biryusa	(Russia) Krasnoyarsk	LD Sokol	Alexander Vedernikov	Valeria Pavlova
Dynamo-Neva	(Russia) Saint Petersburg	Sports Palace "SPBGBU CFMC and VO"	Yevgeni Bobariko	
KRS Vanke Rays	(China) Shenzhen	Shenzhen Dayun Arena	Brian Idalski	Alex Carpenter
KRS Vanke Rays	(Russia) Stupino*	Ice Palace V.M. Bobrova*	Brian Idalski	Alex Carpenter
SKIF	(Russia) Nizhny Novgorod	Trade Union Sport Palace	Vladimir Golubovich	Angelina Goncharenko
SK Gorny	(Russia) Saint Petersburg			
SKSO	(Russia) Yekaterinburg	Kurganovo Sports Complex/KRK Uralets	Sergei Chistyakov	Yekaterina Lebedeva
Tornado	(Russia) Dmitrov	Dmitrov Sports Complex	Alexei Chistyakov	Anna Shokhina

== Regular season ==
Season began on 13 September 2019 and was played until ###.

Pos	Team	Pld	W	OTW	OTL	L	GF	GA	GD	Pts
1	Agidel Ufa	28	22	1	0	5	95	33	+62	68
2	KRS Vanke Rays Shenzhen	28	20	2	1	5	109	39	+70	65
3	Tornado Dmitrov	28	14	1	5	8	63	63	0	49
4	Biryusa Krasnoyarsk	28	12	2	2	12	82	69	+13	42
5	SK Gorny	28	10	3	3	12	73	89	−16	39
6	SKIF Nizhny Novgorod	28	8	5	3	12	78	79	−1	37
7	Dinamo-Neva Saint Petersburg	28	9	2	2	15	68	75	−7	33
8	SKSO Yekaterinburg	28	0	1	1	26	38	159	−121	3

Updated to match(es) played on unknown. Source: Elite Prospects

== Player statistics ==
=== Scoring leaders ===
The following skaters led the league in points.

Player	Team	GP	G	A	Pts
Alex Carpenter	KRS Vanke Rays Shenzhen	27	21	33	54
Rachel Llanes	KRS Vanke Rays Shenzhen	26	21	21	42
Valeria Pavlova	Biryusa Krasnoyarsk	28	25	16	40
Olga Sosina	HC Agidel Ufa	28	20	18	38
Anna Shokhina	HC Tornado	28	17	21	38
Fanuza Kadirova	SK Gorny Ukhta	28	17	14	31
Alena Polenska	HC Agidel Ufa	28	12	18	30
Leah Lum	KRS Vanke Rays Shenzhen	28	10	17	27
Landish Falyakhova	HC SKIF Nizhny Novgorod	28	10	16	26
Yekaterina Lebedeva	HC Agidel Ufa	26	13	12	25
