= Shibanov =

Shibanov (masculine, Russian: Шибанов) or Shibanova (feminine, Russian: Шибанова) is a Russian surname. Notable people with the surname include:

- Anna Shibanova (born 1994), Russian ice hockey player, twin sister of Tatyana
- Tatyana Shibanova (born 1994), Russian ice hockey player, twin sister of Anna
- Mikhail Shibanov, 18th century Russian painter
- Vasily Shibanov, a poem by Aleksey Tolstoy
