= Khimik Voskresensk (women) =

ZhHL ice hockey team in Voskresensk, Russia

Khimik Voskresensk Химик Воскресенск
- City: Voskresensk, Russia
- League: Zhenskaya Hockey League
- Founded: 18 September 2003
- Home arena: Podmoskovye Ice Palace
- Colours: Yellow, blue
- Head coach: Aleksandr Syrtsov
- Captain: Yelena Zaripova
- Website: voshimik.ru

Franchise history
- 2003–2026: HC Tornado
- 2026–: ZhHK Khimik

Championships
- Russian Championship: 9 (2006, 2007, 2009, 2011, 2012, 2013, 2015, 2016, 2017)
- EWCC: 4 (2010, 2012, 2013, 2014)

Khimik Voskresensk (Russian: Химик Воскресенск, lit. 'Chemists Voskresensk') or Women's Ice Hockey Club Himik (Russian: Женский хоккейный клуб «Химик», romanized: Zhenskaya khokkeinyi klub "Himik") (Note: The transliteration of Химик can be rendered as both "Khimik" and "Himik," depending on the romanization standard used. "Khimik" is more commonly seen in English-language media and is therefore prioritized in this article, though the team's official social media, including its Instagram, use "Himik." The abbreviated name of the team is ЖХК «Химик», romanized as ZhKhK Khimik or ZhHK Himik and abbreviated in English as WHC Khimik. The team is alternatively known as Women's Hockey Team Khimik (Russian: Женская хоккейная команда «Химик», romanized: Zhenskaya khokkeinaya komanda "Khimik") and Khimik Moscow Oblast («Химик» Московская область, "Khimik" Moskovskaya oblast'), also translated as Khimik Moscow Region.) is a professional ice hockey team in the Zhenskaya Hockey League (ZhHL). They play at Podmoskovye Ice Palace in Voskresensk, Moscow Oblast, Russia. Khimik has won the Russian Championship nine times and the European Women's Champions Cup four times.

Founded in 2003 as Hockey Club Tornado Moscow Region (Russian: Хоккейный клуб «Торнадо» Московская область, romanized: Khokkeinyi klub "Tornado" Moskovskaya oblast') (Note: The name was often shortened to HC Tornado, Tornado Moscow Region, or Tornado Dmitrov. In English, the team was also referred to as "Moscow Region Tornado," "Tornado Moscow Oblast," or "HK Tornado," a transliteration of ХК «Торнадо». The name "Women's Hockey Team Tornado" (Женская хоккейная команда «Торнадо»), abbreviated "WHC Tornado" (ЖХК «Торнадо», ZhHK Tornado), was often used by Russian-language sources, most notably by the club on its social media accounts, but was rarely encountered in other languages.), the team operated independently for more than two decades and played at the ice palace of the Dmitrov Sport Complex in Dmitrov, Moscow Oblast. In 2025, HC Tornado relocated to Voskresensk and merged into the Khimik ice hockey system, which also opperates the men's ice hockey team Khimik Voskresensk in the VHL. Ahead of the 2026–27 season, the team was rebranded to its current name.

== History ==
The central logo of HC Tornado, used until 2026

Khimik has been a top competitor in the women's ice hockey Russian Championship since its inaugural season in 2003–04. During its first fifteen seasons, Khimik – then known as Tornado – was the dominant force in the Russian Women's Hockey League, winning seven national titles and never finishing below second place. They medaled at five IIHF European Women's Champions Cup (EWCC) tournaments, winning the cup in 2010, 2012, 2013, and 2014, and claiming silver in 2006; Khimik is tied with AIK Hockey for most EWCC titles held by a single team. During the same period, Khimik also won three Challenge Cups and four Czech Women's Cups.

In the 2018–19 season Khimik ranked fifth in the regular season, failing to qualify for the playoffs for the first time in team history. The poor performance was attributed to the absence of several key players, such as Lyudmila Belyakova and Angelina Goncharenko, who were on maternity leave, and the departure of Maria Batalova to Agidel Ufa.

The team returned to the top half of the ZhHL in the 2019–20 season, bolstered by the return of both Belyakova and Goncharenko. Khimik finished the regular season as the second ranked Russian team but the newcomers to the league, China-based Shenzhen KRS Vanke Rays, upset the ZhHL's traditional order, blazing to the top of the ranks and pushing each of the Russian teams down a peg. As a result, Tornado finished the regular season as the third-ranked team overall and faced the first-ranked Vanke Rays in the playoff semifinals, where they were swept by the eventual champions.

== Season-by-season results ==
The following table includes all seasons completed by Khimik since the founding of the Zhenskaya Hockey League in 2015. The team was known as Tornado until 2026.

Note: Finish = Rank at end of regular season; GP = Games played; W = Wins (3 points); OTW = Overtime wins (2 points); OTL = Overtime losses (1 point); L = Losses; GF = Goals for; GA = Goals against; Pts = Points

| Season | League | Regular season | | | | | | | | | | Postseason results |
| Season | League | Finish | GP | W | OTW | OTL | L | GF | GA | Pts | Top scorer | Postseason results |
|---|---|---|---|---|---|---|---|---|---|---|---|---|
| 2015–16 | ZhHL | 1st place, gold medalist(s) | 24 | 18 | 0 | 2 | 4 | 108 | 51 | 56 | (Russia) A. Shokhina, 51 (20+31) | – |
| 2016–17 | ZhHL | 1st place, gold medalist(s) | 36 | 28 | 4 | 1 | 3 | 181 | 67 | 93 | (Russia) A. Shokhina, 81 (39+42) | – |
| 2017–18 | ZhHL | 2nd | 24 | 17 | 0 | 1 | 6 | 115 | 52 | 52 | (Russia) A. Shokhina, 58 (22+36) | (silver) Lost finals to Agidel, 0–3 |
| 2018–19 | ZhHL | 5th | 36 | 15 | 5 | 1 | 15 | 146 | 99 | 56 | (Russia) A. Shokhina, 76 (36+40) | Did not qualify |
| 2019–20 | ZhHL | 3rd | 28 | 14 | 1 | 5 | 8 | 63 | 63 | 49 | (Russia) A. Shokhina, 38 (17+21) | Lost semifinals to KRS Vanke Rays, 0–2 |
| 2020–21 | ZhHL | 6th | 28 | 10 | 1 | 2 | 15 | 90 | 88 | 31 | (Russia) A. Shokhina, 53 (26+27) | Did not qualify |
| 2021–22 | ZhHL | 5th | 36 | 20 | 2 | 4 | 10 | 143 | 93 | 68 | (Russia) A. Shokhina, 83 (31+52) | Lost semifinals |
| 2022–23 | ZhHL | 5th | 32 | 14 | 2 | 3 | 13 | 116 | 110 | 49 | (Russia) A. Shokhina, 50 (18+32) | Lost quarterfinals to Torpedo, 1–2 |
| 2023–24 | ZhHL | 6th | 42 | 13 | 1 | 3 | 25 | 100 | 126 | 44 | (Russia) A. Nesterova, 44 (20+24) | Lost quarterfinals to Biryusa 0–3 |
| 2024–25 | ZhHL | 5th | 42 | 24 | 1 | 3 | 13 | 136 | 101 | 56 | (Russia) Y. Shkalyova, 60 (31+29) | Lost quarterfinals to Biryusa 1–3 |
| 2025–26 | ZhHL | 3rd | 36 | 19 | 2 | 3 | 12 | 128 | 101 | 45 | (Russia) L. Falyakhova, 66 (23+43) | (silver) Lost finals to Agidel, 0–4 |

== Players and personnel ==
=== 2026–27 roster ===
As of 10 October 2026

| No. | Nat | Player | Pos | S/G | Age | Acquired | Birthplace |
|---|---|---|---|---|---|---|---|
| 25 | (Russia) | Polina Belozyorova | D | L | 20 | 2025 | Moscow |
| 5 | (Russia) | Varvara Bidzyura | D | R | 17 | 2025 | Volgograd, Volgograd Oblast |
| 42 | (Russia) | Oksana Bratishcheva | F | L | 26 | 2026 | Chelyabinsk, Chelyabinsk Oblast |
| 71 | (Russia) | Yuliya Churkina | D | L | 18 | 2025 | Balakhna, Nizhny Novgorod Oblast |
| 47 | (Russia) | Yekaterina Davletshina | F | R | 22 | 2019 | Chelyabinsk, Chelyabinsk Oblast |
| 11 | (Russia) | Darya Dutseva | F | R | 19 | 2025 | Lykoyanov, Nizhny Novgorod Oblast |
| 39 | (Russia) | Landysh Falyakhova | F | L | 28 | 2024 | Dva Polya Artash, Tatarstan |
| 76 | (Russia) | Alina Landyreva | F | L | 22 | 2023 | Yaroslavl, Yaroslavl Oblast |
| 68 | (Russia) | Alyona Loginova | F | L | 23 | 2025 | Nizhny, Nizhny Novgorod Oblast |
| 30 | (Russia) | Valeriya Merkusheva | G | L | 27 | 2024 | Moscow |
| 50 | (Russia) | Yuliya Nuyaksheva | D | L | 20 | 2022 | Dmitrov, Moscow Oblast |
| 13 | (Russia) | Nina Pirogova (A) | D | L | 27 | 2026 | Stupino, Moscow Oblast |
| 19 | (Russia) | Yelizaveta Serkova | D | L | 17 | 2025 | Moscow |
| 89 | (Russia) | Mariya Shirshova | F | R | 21 | 2025 | Odintsovo, Moscow Oblast |
| 9 | (Russia) | Yelizaveta Shkalyova | F | L | 23 | 2017 | Sergiyev Posad, Moscow Oblast |
| 28 | (Russia) | Alyona Shmykova | D | L | 24 | 2025 | Dzerzhinsk, Nizhny Novgorod Oblast |
| 1 | (Russia) | Valeriya Tarakanova | G | L | 28 | 2026 | Nizhny, Nizhny Novgorod Oblast |
| 24 | (Russia) | Taisiya Tuigunova | F | L | 17 | 2026 | Vanino, Khabarovsk Krai |
| 22 | (Russia) | Anna Vakhminova | D | L | 17 | 2025 | |
| 52 | (Russia) | Yuliya Volkova | G | L | 22 | 2025 | Stupino, Moscow Oblast |
| 27 | (Russia) | Olga Volodina | F | L | 22 | 2023 | Chkalovsk, Nizhny Novgorod Oblast |
| 59 | (Russia) | Yelena Zaripova (C) | F | L | 30 | 2025 | Moscow |
| 86 | (Russia) | Darya Zubok (A) | D | L | 27 | 2015 | Megion, Khanty-Mansia |
| 91 | (Russia) | Angelina Zherebyatyeva | F | L | 19 | 2022 | Stupino, Moscow Oblast |

Coaching staff and team personnel

- Head coach: Aleksandr Syrtsov
- Assistant coach: Oleg Namestnikov
- Goaltending coach: Mikhail Vorobyov
- Video coach: Vasili Danilov
- Team manager: Vladimir Kalupin
- Equipment manager: Irina Saakova
- Massage therapist: Vera Andreeva

=== Team captains ===
- Yekaterina Smolentseva, 2009–10
- Olga Permyakova, 2011–2015
- Anna Shokhina, 2015–2023
- Yekaterina Zakharova, 2023–24
- Landysh Falyakhova, 2024–2026
- Yelena Zaripova, 2026–

=== Head coaches ===
- Alexei Chistyakov, 2009–2023
- Sergei Bondarenko, 2023–2025
- Aleksander Syrtsov, 2025–

=== General managers ===
- Olga Votolovskaya, 2007–2014
- Mikhail Cherkovsky, 2017–18
- Sergei Konovalov, 2018–2022

== Team honors ==
=== Russian Championship ===
(gold) Russian Champion (9):

- Russian Women's Hockey League: 2006, 2007, 2009, 2011, 2012, 2013, 2015
- Zhenskaya Hockey League: 2016, 2017

(silver) Runners-up (7):

- Russian Women's Hockey League: 2004, 2005, 2008, 2010, 2014
- Zhenskaya Hockey League: 2018, 2026

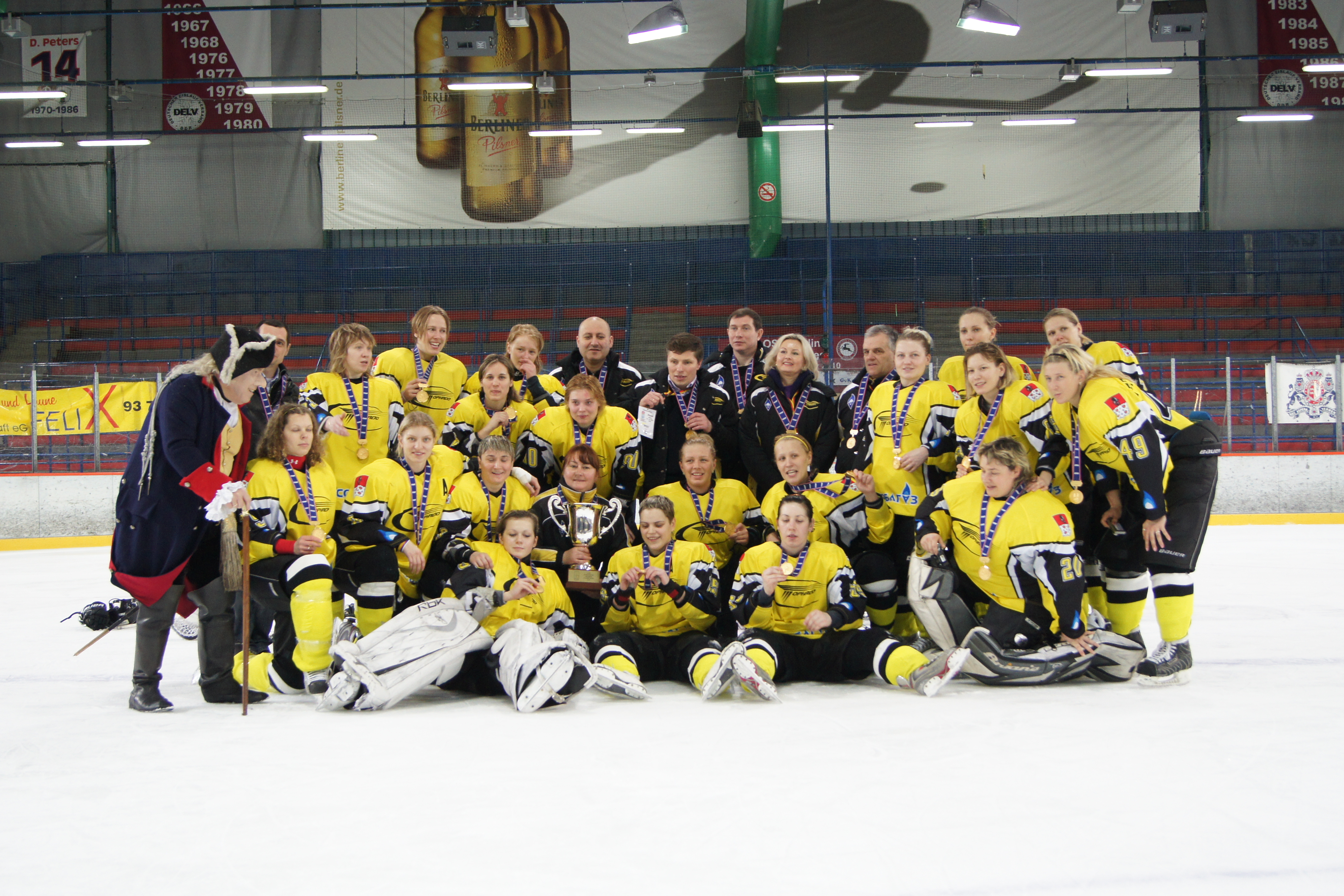
HC Tornado celebrating their 2010 EWCC victory

=== IIHF European Women's Champions Cup ===
The European Women's Champions Cup (EWCC) was an annual international tournament for ice hockey club teams, organized by the International Ice Hockey Federation (IIHF). It was contested from 2004 until 2015 and featured the national champion in women's ice hockey from each of the participating nations.

(gold) European Women's Champion (4): 2010, 2012, 2013, 2014
(silver) Runners-up (1): 2006

=== Other ===
Challenge Cup (3): 2004, 2005, 2006
Czech Women's Cup (4): 2010, 2011, 2012, 2013

== Franchise records and leaders ==
Records and statistics valid through the conclusion of the 2025–26 ZhHL season.

=== Single-season records ===
For statistics measured by percentage or average, skaters playing in less than 80% of games and goaltenders playing in fewer than ten games in a season not included.

- Most goals: Yekaterina Smolentseva, 102 goals (48 games; 2012–13)
- Most assists: Yekaterina Smolentseva, 84 assists (48 games; 2012–13)
- Most points: Yekaterina Smolentseva, 186 points (48 games; 2012–13)
- Most points, defenceman: Inna Dyubanok, 100 points (48 games; 2012–13)
- Highest average points per game: Yekaterina Smolentseva, 3.88 P/G (48 games; 2012–13)
- Most penalty minutes: Tatiana Burina, 106 PIM (45 games; 2012–13)
- Best save percentage: Valeriya Merkusheva, .938 SV% (36 games; 2024–25)
- Best goals against average: Valentina Ostrovlyanchik, 1.25 GAA (24 games; 2014–15)
- Most shutouts: Anna Prugova, 12 SO (28 games; 2012–13)
- Most games played, goaltender: Valeriya Merkusheva, 36 games (2024–25)

=== Career records ===
For statistics measured by percentage or average, skaters playing in fewer than sixty games and goaltenders playing in fewer than thirty games not included.

- Most goals: Anna Shokhina, 317 goals (348 games; 2012–2023)
- Most career assists: Anna Shokhina, 385 assists (348 games; 2012–2023)
- Most career points: Anna Shokhina, 702 points (348 games; 2012–2023)
- Most career points, defenceman: Nina Pirogova, 284 points (281 games; 2013–2023)
- Highest average points per game: Yekaterina Smolentseva, 3.20 P/G (80 games; 2009–2014)
- Most career penalty minutes: Tatiana Burina, 302 PIM (2009–2017)
- Most games played, skater: Anna Shokhina, 348 games (2012–2021)
- Best save percentage: Valeriya Merkusheva, .935 SV% (61 games; 2024–2026)
- Best goals against average: Yelizaveta Kondakova, 2.01 GAA (44 games; 2015–2020)
- Most games played, goaltender: Anna Prugova, 116 games (2009–2015)
- Most shutouts: Anna Prugova, 33 shutouts (116 games; 2009–2015)

=== All-time scoring leaders ===
The following table lists the top ten point-scorers in team history, regular season and postseason inclusive.

Note: Nat = Nationality; Pos = Position; GP = Games played; G = Goals; A = Assists; Pts = Points; P/G = Points per game; ^ = 2026–27 Khimik player; Italics* indicate totals are sourced from incomplete statistics

| Nat | Player | Pos | GP | G | A | Pts | P/G |
|---|---|---|---|---|---|---|---|
| (Russia) | Anna Shokhina | RW | 361 | 327 | 394 | 721 | 1.997 |
| (Russia) | Yelena Zaripova^ | C | 296 | 135 | 283 | 415 | 1.402 |
| (Russia) | Tatyana Burina | F | 217* | 149* | 248* | 397* | 1.829* |
| (Russia) | Alevtina Polunina | LW | 273 | 166 | 142 | 308 | 1.128 |
| (Russia) | Nina Pirogova^ | D | 297 | 93 | 201 | 294 | 0.989 |
| (Russia) | Yekaterina Smolentseva | C | 88* | 153* | 136* | 289* | 3.284* |
| (Slovakia) | Jana Kapustová | LW | 128 | 115 | 154 | 269 | 2.102 |
| (Russia) | Galina Skiba | RW | 243* | 126* | 120* | 246* | 1.012* |
| (Russia) | Yelizaveta Shkalyova^ | RW | 263 | 134 | 107 | 241 | 0.916 |
| (Russia) | Inna Dyubanok | D | 108* | 58* | 134* | 192* | 1.778* |

== Notable alumnae ==
=== Russian alumnae ===
Seasons active with Khimik listed alongside player name.

- Nadezhda Alexandrova, 2015–2019
- Maria Batalova, 2014–2018
- Lyudmila Belyakova, 2014–15, 2016–2018 & 2019–20
- Tatiana Burina, 2009–2017
- Yelena Dergachyova, 2014–2019
- Yekaterina Dil, 2003–04
- Inna Dyubanok, 2009–2013
- Iya Gavrilova, 2006–07, 2008–2010 & 2013–14
- Angelina Goncharenko, 2014–2018
- Olga Permyakova, 2009–2015
- Kristina Petrovskaia, 2009–2013
- Alevtina Polunina (née Shtaryova), 2013–2020
- Zoya Polunina, 2009–2014
- Anna Prugova, 2009–2015
- Marina Sergina, 2009–2014
- Anna Shokhina, 2012–2023
- Anna Shukina, 2011–2015
- Galina Skiba, 2006–2021
- Yekaterina Smolentseva, 2009–2014
- Yekaterina Smolina, 2009–2015
- Alyona Starovoitova, 2016–2020
- Svetlana Tkacheva, 2011–2015 & 2017–18
- Svetlana Trefilova, 2003–04

==== National team participation ====
Khimik players have historically represented a significant contingent of the Russian national ice hockey team rosters for the IIHF World Women's Championship and Winter Olympic Games.

The 21-woman roster selected to represent Russia in the women's ice hockey tournament at the 2014 Winter Olympics included nine Khimik players. In December 2017, eight Russian team players were disqualified from the tournament and banned for life from Olympic participation for doping violations. Four of the implicated players were with HC Tornado at the time of the games, forwards Ekaterina Smolentseva, Galina Skiba, and Tatiana Burina, and defenceman Anna Shukina. Sanctions were later annulled for Smolentseva, Burina, and Shukina. The disqualification of Skiba and two other Russian players was upheld, as was the suspension of the Russian Olympic Committee by the International Olympic Committee (IIHF). The Ice Hockey Federation of Russia did not sanction any of the eight players involved and their totals from the 2013–14 RWHL season remain on record.

Russia was banned from competing in the 2018 Winter Olympics by the IOC as part of the Oswald Commission rulings regarding state-sponsored doping. However, Russian athletes were permitted to compete under the designation Olympic Athletes from Russia. In practical terms, this was largely performative as the Olympic Athletes from Russia (OAR) women's ice hockey team roster was nearly identical to the Russian national team roster that competed at the 2017 IIHF Women's World Championship. The team was coached by long-time HC Tornado head coach Alexei Vladimirovich Chistyakov and included ten Tornado players. Tornado players Maria Batalova and Yelena Dergachyova served as the team's two alternate captains and HC Tornado captain Anna Shokhina was the team's top scorer in the tournament. OAR lost the bronze medal game against Finland and finished in fourth place.

=== International players ===
Six nations and five national teams are represented by Khimik's international alumnae.

Flag indicates nation of primary IIHF eligibility.

- (Canada) Correne Bredin, 2008–2010
- (United States) Cherie Hendrickson, 2013–14
- (Sweden) Elin Holmlöv, 2011–2013
- (Canada) Melissa Jaques, 2011–12
- (Slovakia) Jana Kapustová, 2008–2013
- (Latvia) Iveta Koka, 2009–10
- (Sweden) Kim Martin Hasson, 2011–12
- (Sweden) Frida Nevalainen, 2010–11
- (Latvia) Ieva Pētersone, 2008–09
- (Slovakia) Petra Pravlíková, 2009–10
- (Sweden) Danijela Rundqvist, 2011–12
- (Canada) Brittany Simpson, 2013–14
- (Belarus) Mariya Skvortsova, 2009–10
- (United States) Kelley Steadman, 2013–14
- (Slovakia) Zuzana Tomčíková, 2012–2014
