= Balakirevo =

Balakirevo may refer to:

- Balakirevo, Vladimir Oblast, urban settlement in Vladimir Oblast, Russia
- Balakirevo railway station, station at the Northern Railway (Russia)
- Balakirevo, Tver Oblast, village in Russia
- Balakirevo, Yaroslavl Oblast, village in Russia
