= Jessica Lutz =

Swiss ice hockey player

- Born: 24 May 1989 (age 37) Thal, St. Gallen, Switzerland
- Height: 174 cm (5 ft 9 in)
- Weight: 65 kg (143 lb; 10 st 3 lb)
- Position: Forward
- Shot: Left
- Played for: UConn Huskies
- National team: Switzerland
- Playing career: 2007–2014
Medal record
Women's ice hockey
Representing Switzerland
Olympic Games
Bronze medal – third place	2014 Sochi	Team

Jessica Joy Lutz (born 24 May 1989) is a Swiss-American retired ice hockey forward who competed internationally with the Swiss national team. She represented Switzerland in women's ice hockey at the 2014 Winter Olympics and won the bronze medal after defeating Sweden in the bronze medal playoff.

Lutz's hometown is Rockville, Maryland, and she is a dual citizen of the United States and Switzerland. Her father was born in Switzerland.

She played college hockey with the UConn Huskies.

She scored the go ahead goal in the bronze medal game against Sweden.
