= Oswald Commission =

Commission of the International Olympic Committee

The Oswald Commission was a disciplinary commission of the International Olympic Committee ("IOC"), chaired by IOC member Denis Oswald. It was responsible for investigating and ruling on doping violations by individual Russian athletes at the 2014 Winter Olympic Games in Sochi.

By December 2017, the commission had banned 43 athletes from the Olympics for life, and retroactively disqualified them from their Sochi Olympic events with 13 medals being stripped. 30 of the 43 athletes later successfully appealed to the Court of Arbitration for Sport and had their sanctions overturned; and another 12 had their doping rulings confirmed, but had their lifetime bans commuted to bans for only the 2018 Winter Olympics in Pyeongchang. One athlete did not appeal. The IOC banned Russia from competing at Pyeongchang as a result of the scandal, instead inviting 169 Russian athletes to compete as "Olympic Athletes from Russia" under the Olympic flag rather than under the Russian flag.

== Background ==
Media attention began growing in December 2014 when German broadcaster ARD aired the documentary "Top Secret Doping: How Russia makes its Winners", alleging the existence of a sophisticated, state-sponsored doping system within the All-Russia Athletic Federation, and comparing it to doping in East Germany. In November 2015, the World Anti-Doping Agency (WADA) published a report and the International Association of Athletics Federations (IAAF) suspended Russia indefinitely from world track and field events. The United Kingdom Anti-Doping agency later assisted WADA with testing in Russia. In June 2016, they reported that they were unable to fully carry out their work and noted intimidation by armed Federal Security Service (FSB) agents. After a Russian former lab director made allegations about the 2014 Winter Olympics in Sochi, WADA commissioned an independent investigation led by Richard McLaren. McLaren's investigation found corroborating evidence, concluding in a report published in July 2016 that the Ministry of Sport and the FSB had operated a "state-directed failsafe system" using a "disappearing positive [test] methodology" (DPM) from "at least late 2011 to August 2015".

== Sochi investigation ==
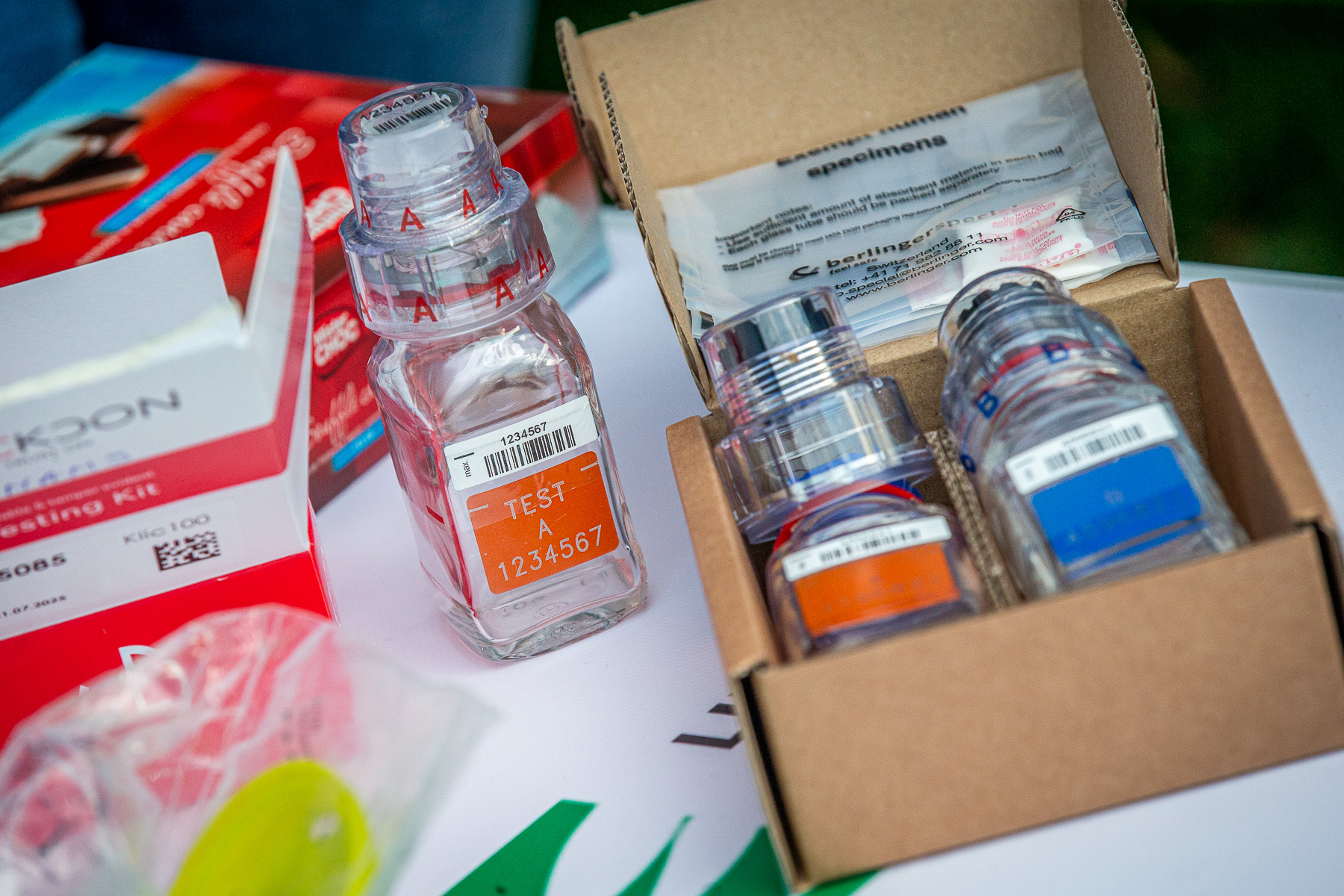
Urine sampling bottles

The IOC established the Disciplinary Commission and the Inquiry Commissions in July 2016, following the publication of the McLaren Report. The IOC took this measure since Prof. McLaren did not have the authority to bring forward Anti-Doping Rule Violation (ADRV) cases against individual athletes. After receiving the results from the final McLaren Report in December 2016, the IOC opened proceedings against the 28 Russian athletes mentioned in the report (the number later rose to 46, which are now being heard by the Oswald Commission.

On November 1, 2017 a cross-country skier Alexander Legkov who won a gold medal was disqualified and banned for life by the Commission. His Sochi results were wiped from the record. A second Russian cross-country skier who didn't get to the podium was also disqualified and banned for life. 8 days later four more Russian cross-country skiers who won a combined 3 medals were found guilty of doping. The total was brought to ten when four skeleton racers were disqualified on November 22, 2017, two medals (gold and bronze) were stripped off. On November 24, 2017 the IOC imposed life bans on bobsledder Alexandr Zubkov and speed skater Olga Fatkulina who won a combined 3 medals (2 gold, 1 silver). Olga Stulneva and Aleksandr Rumyantsev were also disqualified. All their results were wiped from the record, meaning that Russia lost its first place in the medal standings. On November 27, 2017 IOC sanctioned Olga Vilukhina, Yana Romanova, Sergey Chudinov, Alexey Negodaylo, and Dmitry Trunenkov, and stripped Vilyukhina and Romanova of their medals in biathlon. 3 athletes who didn't win medals were sanctioned on November 29, 2017. 2 days later Olga Zaitseva who won silver in biathlon and two other athletes were also disqualified. On December 12, 2017 six Russian ice hockey players were disqualified. Bobsledder Alexey Voyevoda who had been already stripped of his gold medals due to the anti-doping violations committed by his teammates was sanctioned on December 18, 2017. Eleven athletes were banned on December 22, 2017. Among them, silver medalists Albert Demchenko and Tatiana Ivanova who were stripped of their medals.

=== List of disqualified sportspeople ===
Name	Country	Sport	Banned substance	Medals	Details of test	CAS appeals result
Alexander Legkov	Russia	Cross-country skiing	Disappearing sample	(gold) gold (silver) silver	IOC sanction imposed in 2017	Sanctions annulled/Results reinstated
Evgeniy Belov	Russia	Cross-country skiing	Disappearing sample		IOC sanction imposed in 2017	Sanctions annulled/Results reinstated
Maksim Vylegzhanin	Russia	Cross-country skiing	Disappearing sample	(silver) silver (silver) silver (silver) silver	IOC sanction imposed in 2017	Sanctions annulled/Results reinstated
Evgenia Shapovalova	Russia	Cross-country skiing	Disappearing sample		IOC sanction imposed in 2017	Sanctions annulled/Results reinstated
Alexei Petukhov	Russia	Cross-country skiing	Disappearing sample		IOC sanction imposed in 2017	Sanctions annulled/Results reinstated
Yulia Ivanova	Russia	Cross-country skiing	Disappearing sample		IOC sanction imposed in 2017	Sanctions upheld
Aleksandr Tretyakov	Russia	Skeleton	Disappearing sample	(gold) gold	IOC sanction imposed in 2017	Sanctions annulled/Results reinstated
Elena Nikitina	Russia	Skeleton	Disappearing sample	(bronze) bronze	IOC sanction imposed in 2017	Sanctions annulled/Results reinstated
Olga Potylitsina	Russia	Skeleton	Disappearing sample		IOC sanction imposed in 2017	Sanctions annulled/Results reinstated
Maria Orlova	Russia	Skeleton	Disappearing sample		IOC sanction imposed in 2017	Sanctions annulled/Results reinstated
Olga Stulneva	Russia	Bobsleigh	Disappearing sample		IOC sanction imposed in 2017	Sanctions annulled/Results reinstated
Alexandr Zubkov	Russia	Bobsleigh	Disappearing sample	(gold) gold (gold) gold	IOC sanction imposed in 2017	Sanctions upheld
Olga Fatkulina	Russia	Speed skating	Disappearing sample	(silver) silver	IOC sanction imposed in 2017	Sanctions annulled/Results reinstated
Aleksandr Rumyantsev	Russia	Speed skating	Disappearing sample		IOC sanction imposed in 2017	Sanctions annulled/Results reinstated
Aleksei Negodaylo	Russia	Bobsleigh	Disappearing sample	(gold) gold	IOC sanction imposed in 2017	Sanctions annulled/Team disqualified
Dmitry Trunenkov	Russia	Bobsleigh	Disappearing sample	(gold) gold	IOC sanction imposed in 2017	Sanctions annulled/Team disqualified
Olga Vilukhina	Russia	Biathlon	Disappearing sample	(silver) silver (silver) silver	IOC sanction imposed in 2017	Sanctions annulled/Results reinstated
Yana Romanova	Russia	Biathlon	Disappearing sample	(silver) silver	IOC sanction imposed in 2017	Sanctions annulled/Results reinstated
Sergei Chudinov	Russia	Skeleton	Disappearing sample		IOC sanction imposed in 2017	Sanctions annulled/Results reinstated
Alexander Kasjanov	Russia	Bobsleigh	Disappearing sample		IOC sanction imposed in 2017	Sanctions upheld
Aleksei Pushkarev	Russia	Bobsleigh	Disappearing sample		IOC sanction imposed in 2017	Sanctions upheld
Ilvir Huzin	Russia	Bobsleigh	Disappearing sample		IOC sanction imposed in 2017	Sanctions upheld
Yuliya Chekalyova	Russia	Cross-country skiing	Disappearing sample		IOC sanction imposed in 2017	Sanctions upheld
Anastasia Dotsenko	Russia	Cross-country skiing	Disappearing sample		IOC sanction imposed in 2017	Sanctions upheld
Olga Zaitseva	Russia	Biathlon	Disappearing sample	(silver) silver	IOC sanction imposed in 2017	Sanctions upheld
Inna Dyubanok	Russia	Ice hockey	Disappearing sample		IOC sanction imposed in 2017	Sanctions upheld
Yekaterina Lebedeva	Russia	Ice hockey	Disappearing sample		IOC sanction imposed in 2017	Sanctions annulled/Team disqualified
Yekaterina Pashkevich	Russia	Ice hockey	Disappearing sample		IOC sanction imposed in 2017	Sanctions annulled/Team disqualified
Anna Shibanova	Russia	Ice hockey	Disappearing sample		IOC sanction imposed in 2017	Sanctions upheld
Yekaterina Smolentseva	Russia	Ice hockey	Disappearing sample		IOC sanction imposed in 2017	Sanctions annulled/Team disqualified
Galina Skiba	Russia	Ice hockey	Disappearing sample		IOC sanction imposed in 2017	Sanctions upheld
Alexey Voyevoda	Russia	Bobsleigh	Disappearing sample	(gold) gold (gold) gold	IOC sanction imposed in 2017	Sanctions upheld
Albert Demchenko	Russia	Luge	Disappearing sample	(silver) silver (silver) silver	IOC sanction imposed in 2017	Sanctions annulled/Results reinstated
Tatiana Ivanova	Russia	Luge	Disappearing sample	(silver) silver	IOC sanction imposed in 2017	Sanctions annulled/Results reinstated
Ivan Skobrev	Russia	Speed skating	Disappearing sample		IOC sanction imposed in 2017	Sanctions annulled/Results reinstated
Artyom Kuznetsov	Russia	Speed skating	Disappearing sample		IOC sanction imposed in 2017	Sanctions annulled/Results reinstated
Liudmila Udobkina	Russia	Bobsleigh	Disappearing sample		IOC sanction imposed in 2017	Sanctions annulled/Results reinstated
Maxim Belugin	Russia	Bobsleigh	Disappearing sample		IOC sanction imposed in 2017	No appeal filed
Tatiana Burina	Russia	Ice hockey	Disappearing sample		IOC sanction imposed in 2017	Sanctions annulled/Team disqualified
Anna Shukina	Russia	Ice hockey	Disappearing sample		IOC sanction imposed in 2017	Sanctions annulled/Team disqualified
Nikita Kryukov	Russia	Cross-country skiing	Disappearing sample	(silver) silver	IOC sanction imposed in 2017	Sanctions annulled/Results reinstated
Alexander Bessmertnykh	Russia	Cross-country skiing	Disappearing sample	(silver) silver	IOC sanction imposed in 2017	Sanctions annulled/Results reinstated
Natalya Matveyeva	Russia	Cross-country skiing	Disappearing sample		IOC sanction imposed in 2017	Sanctions annulled/Results reinstated

== See also ==
- Russia at the 2014 Winter Olympics
