= Mikhail Chekanov =

Russian ice hockey coach

Mikhail Chekanov (born January 13, 1961) is a Russian ice hockey coach. He coached the Russian national team at the 2015 IIHF Women's World Championship.
