= Tatyana Shibanova =

Russian ice hockey player

Tatyana Shibanova Татьяна Шибанова
- Born: 10 November 1994 (age 31) Omsk, Russia
- Height: 1.63 m (5 ft 4 in)
- Weight: 66 kg (146 lb; 10 st 6 lb)
- Position: Forward
- Shoots: Left
- Kadınlar Ligi team Former teams: Buz Beykoz SK; Genc Ankaralilar SK; Buz Adamlar GSK; Tomiris Astana; Buz Korsanları SK; Arktik-Universitet Ukhta; Agidel Ufa
- National team: Russia
- Playing career: 2014–present

Tatyana Sergeyevna Shibanova (Russian: Татьяна Сергеевна Шибанова; born 10 November 1994) is a Russian ice hockey player, currently playing with Buz Beykoz SK of the Turkish Kadınlar Ligi. She represented Russia at the 2015 IIHF Women's World Championship, alongside her twin sister Anna.
