= Sophie Kratzer =

German ice hockey player (1989–2020)

- Born: 20 April 1989; Landshut, West Germany
- Died: 13 January 2020 (aged 30); Munich, Germany
- Height: 170 cm (5 ft 7 in)
- Weight: 72 kg (159 lb; 11 st 5 lb)
- Position: Forward
- Shot: Left
- DFEL team: ESC Planegg
- National team: Germany
- Playing career: 2006–2017

Sophie Kratzer (20 April 1989 – 13 January 2020) was a German ice hockey forward.

== International career ==
Sophie Kratzer grew up in Velden (Vils) and started her hockey career in the youth teams of local clubs ESC Dorfen and ESV Gebensbach. From 2003 to 2017 she played in the Premier Division (1. Bundesliga) for the ESC Planegg, and won seven German icehockey championships with the team.

Kratzer was selected for the Germany women's national ice hockey team in the 2014 Winter Olympics. She had two assists in five games.

Kratzer also played for Germany in the qualifying event for the 2014 Winter Olympics.

As of 2014, Kratzer had also appeared for Germany at three IIHF Women's World Championships. Her first appearance came in 2009.

Kratzer died of cancer aged 30 on 13 January 2020.

== Career statistics ==
=== International career ===
Year	Team	Event	GP	G	A	Pts	PIM
2009	Germany	WW DI	5	0	0	0	2
2011	Germany	WW DI	4	1	3	4	2
2013	Germany	OlyQ	3	1	0	1	0
2013	Germany	WW	5	0	1	1	2
2014	Germany	Oly	5	0	2	2	0
2016	Germany	WW DI	5	0	0	0	4
2017	Germany	OlyQ	3	1	1	2	0
2017	Germany	WW	6	0	1	1	4
