= Inna Dyubanok =

Russian ice hockey player

Inna Dyubanok Инна Дюбанок
- Born: 20 February 1990 (age 36) Mozhaysk, Russian SSR, Soviet Union
- Height: 169 cm (5 ft 7 in)
- Weight: 85 kg (187 lb; 13 st 5 lb)
- Position: Defence
- Shoots: Left
- ZhHL team Former teams: Belye Medveditsy Chelyabinsk; Dynamo Saint Petersburg; Agidel Ufa; Tornado Dmitrov
- National team: Russia
- Playing career: 2007–present
Medal record
Women's ice hockey
Representing Russia
World Championship
Bronze medal – third place	2013 Canada

Inna Nikolayevna Dyubanok (Russian: Инна Николаевна Дюбанок; born 20 February 1990) is a Russian ice hockey defenseman, currently playing with Belye Medveditsy of the Zhenskaya Hockey League (ZhHL).

== International career ==
Dyubanok was selected for the Russia national women's ice hockey team in the 2010 Winter Olympics. She played in all five games, recording one assist.

Dyubanok has also appeared for Russia at five IIHF Women's World Championships, Her first appearance came in 2008. She was a member of the team that won a bronze medal at the 2013 IIHF Women's World Championship.

In December 2017, she and seven other Russian hockey players were sanctioned for doping and their results from the women's ice hockey tournament at the 2014 Winter Olympics were disqualified as part of the Oswald Commission. All of the sanctioned players appealed the decision and the disqualifications were annulled for five of them; however, sanctions were upheld for Dyubanok, Galina Skiba, and Anna Shibanova.

She also competed in one junior tournament for the Russia women's national under-18 ice hockey team, playing in the inaugural event in 2008.

== Career statistics ==
=== International career ===
Year	Team	Event	GP	G	A	Pts	PIM
2008	Russia U18	U18	5	0	2	2	26
2008	Russia	WW	4	0	0	0	4
2009	Russia	WW	4	1	0	1	2
2010	Russia	Oly	5	0	1	1	4
2011	Russia	WW	6	1	0	1	14
2012	Russia	WW	5	1	2	3	8
2013	Russia	WW	6	0	0	0	4
