= Galina Skiba =

Russian ice hockey player

Galina Skiba Галина Скиба
- Born: 9 May 1984 (age 42) Kharkiv, Ukrainian SSR, Soviet Union
- Height: 163 cm (5 ft 4 in)
- Weight: 67 kg (148 lb; 10 st 8 lb)
- Position: Right wing
- Shoots: Left
- ZhHL team Former teams: Tornado Moscow Oblast; SKIF Moscow
- National team: Russia
- Playing career: 2004–present
Medal record
Women's ice hockey
Representing Russia
World Championship
Bronze medal – third place	2013 Canada
Bronze medal – third place	2016 Canada

Galina Yuryevna Skiba (Russian: Галина Юрьевна Скиба; born 9 May 1984) is a Russian ice hockey forward. She most recently played with HC Tornado in the 2020–21 season of the Zhenskaya Hockey League (ZhHL).

== International career ==
Skiba was selected for the Russian women's national ice hockey team in the 2006 and 2014 Winter Olympics. In 2006, she had one assist in five games, and in 2014, she played in all six games, scoring a pair of goals.

As of 2014, Skiba has also appeared for Russia at six IIHF Women's World Championships. Her first appearance came in 2005. She won a bronze medal as a part of the team in 2013 and 2016.

In December 2017, she and seven other Russian hockey players were sanctioned for doping and their results from the women's ice hockey tournament at the 2014 Winter Olympics were disqualified as part of the Oswald Commission. All of the sanctioned players appealed the decision and disqualifications were annulled in five cases; however, sanctions were upheld for Skiba, Inna Dyubanok, and Anna Shibanova.

== Career statistics ==
=== International career ===
Through 2013–14 season

Year	Team	Event	GP	G	A	Pts	PIM
2005	Russia	WW	5	0	0	0	2
2006	Russia	Oly	5	0	0	0	2
2007	Russia	WW	4	0	1	1	2
2008	Russia	WW	4	0	0	0	2
2011	Russia	WW	6	0	1	1	2
2012	Russia	WW	5	1	1	2	2
2013	Russia	WW	6	1	1	2	6
2014	Russia	Oly	6	2	0	2	2
