= Alexei Chistyakov =

Russian ice hockey player and coach

Alexei Chistyakov Алексей Чистяков
- Born: 7 April 1968 (age 58) Yaroslavl, Russian SFSR, Soviet Union
- Height: 1.68 m (5 ft 6 in)
- Weight: 78 kg (172 lb; 12 st 4 lb)
- Position: Forward
- Played for: Lokomotiv Yaroslavl; Amur Khabarovsk; Severstal Cherepovets; KomiTEK Nizhny Odes; Dizel Penza; Kristall Elektrostal; HC Vityaz; Elemash Elektrostal; Neftyanik Almetyevsk; Titan Klin
- Current ZhHL coach: HC Tornado
- Coached for: Russia; OAR
- Playing career: 1983–2006
- Coaching career: 2008–present
Medal record
Representing Russia
Women's ice hockey (as head coach)
Universiade
Gold medal – first place	2017 Almaty	Ice hockey
Gold medal – first place	2019 Krasnoyarsk	Ice hockey

Alexei Vladimirovich Chistyakov (Russian: Алексей Владимирович Чистяков; born 7 April 1968) is a Russian ice hockey coach and former professional player. He currently serves as head coach of HC Tornado in the Zhenskaya Hockey League (ZhHL).

Chistyakov served as head coach of the Russian national team for the IIHF Women's World Championships in 2017 and 2019, the women's ice hockey tournament at the 2017 Winter Universiade and the women's ice hockey tournament at the 2019 Winter Universiade. He was head coach of the Olympic Athletes from Russia women's national ice hockey team that competed in the women's ice hockey tournament at the 2018 Winter Olympics.
