= Susann Götz =

German ice hockey player

- Born: 14 December 1982 (age 42); Bad Muskau, East Germany
- Height: 5 ft 4 in (163 cm)
- Weight: 148 lb (67 kg; 10 st 8 lb)
- Position: Defense
- Shoots: L
- National team: Germany
- Playing career: 2005–present

Susann Götz (born 14 December 1982 in Bad Muskau, East Germany) is a German ice hockey defender.

== International career ==
Götz was selected for the Germany women's national ice hockey team in the 2006 and 2014 Winter Olympics. In 2006, she did not record a point in five games. In 2014, she had one goal and three assists in the five games.

Götz also played for Germany in the qualifying event for the 2014 Winter Olympics, the 2010 Olympics and the 2006 Olympics.

As of 2014, Götz has also appeared for Germany at eight IIHF Women's World Championships. Her first appearance came in 2004.

== Career statistics ==
=== International career ===
Through 2013-14 season

Year	Team	Event	GP	G	A	Pts	PIM
2004	Germany	WW	4	0	0	0	6
2004	Germany	OlyQ	3	1	1	2	0
2005	Germany	WW	5	1	0	0	2
2006	Germany	Oly	5	0	0	0	6
2007	Germany	WW	4	0	0	0	2
2008	Germany	WW	4	1	0	1	2
2008	Germany	OlyQ	3	0	1	1	0
2009	Germany	WW DI	4	1	1	2	4
2011	Germany	WW DI	4	1	3	4	2
2012	Germany	WW	5	0	3	3	4
2013	Germany	OlyQ	3	1	2	3	4
2013	Germany	WW	5	1	1	2	2
2014	Germany	Oly	5	1	3	4	4
