= Svetlana Tkacheva =

Russian ice hockey player

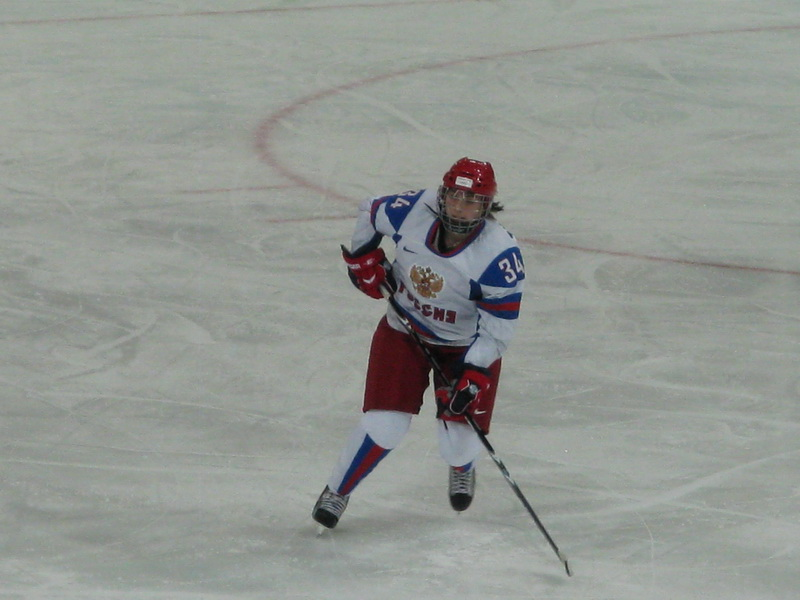
- Tkacheva watches the play against China during the 2010 Winter Olympics
- Born: 3 November 1984 (age 42) Moscow, Russian SFSR, Soviet Union
- Height: 5 ft 7 in (170 cm)
- Weight: 150 lb (68 kg; 10 st 10 lb)
- Position: Defence
- Shoots: Left
- RWHL team: Tornado Moscow Region
- National team: Russia
- Playing career: 2009–present
Medal record
World Championship
Bronze medal – third place	2013 Canada

Svetlana Valeriyevna Tkacheva (Russian: Светлана Валерьевна Ткачёва, born 3 November 1984) is a Russian female ice hockey player. She was part of the Russia women's national ice hockey team that participated in the 2010 Winter Olympics. Russia finished 6th.
