= Yekaterina Smolentseva =

Russian ice hockey player (born 1981)

Yekaterina Smolentseva Екатерина Смоленцева
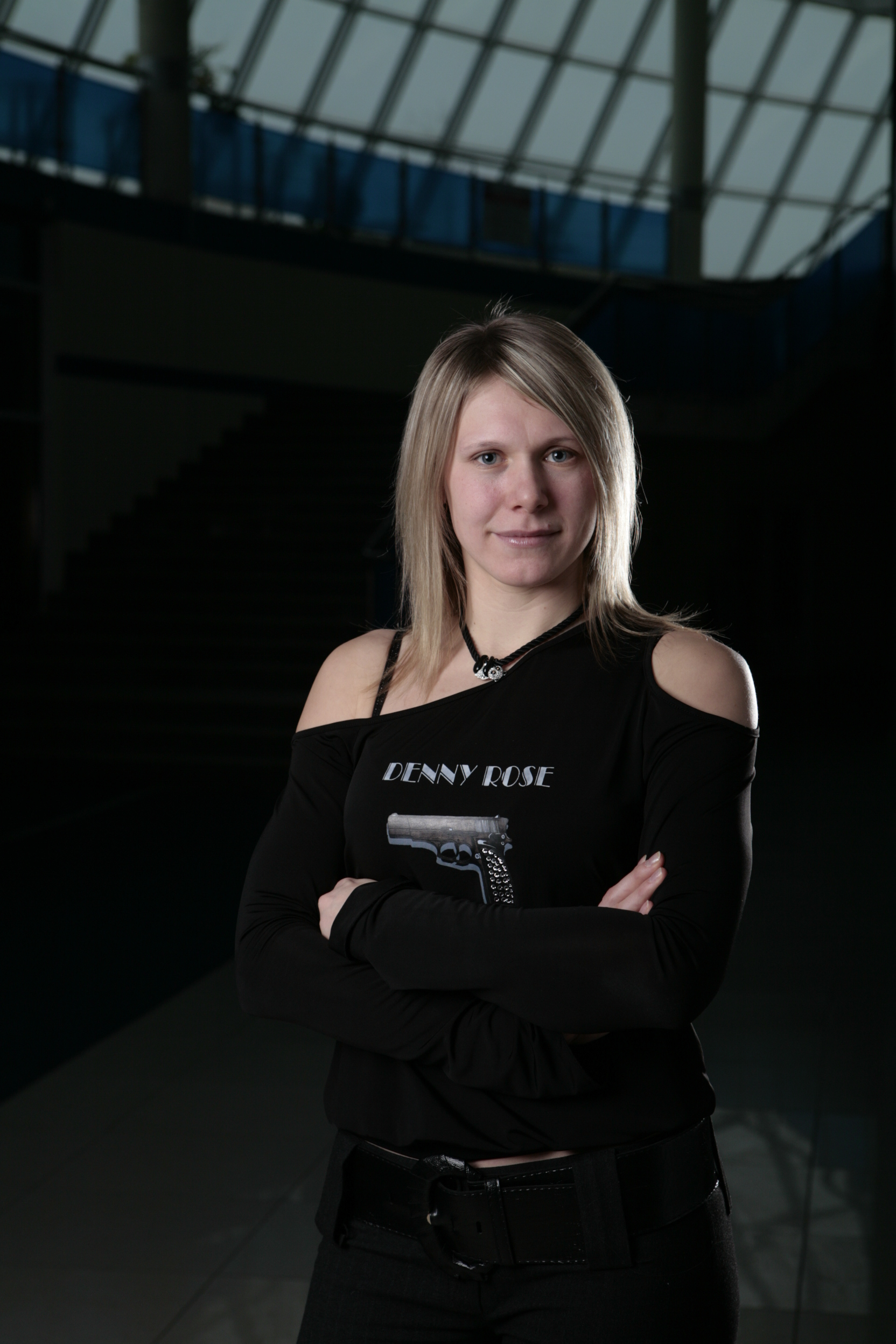
- Born: 15 September 1981 (age 45) Pervouralsk, Soviet Union
- Height: 170 cm (5 ft 7 in)
- Weight: 64 kg (141 lb; 10 st 1 lb)
- Position: Forward
- Shot: Left
- Played for: Agidel Ufa; Connecticut Whale; SKIF Nizhny Novgorod; Tornado Moscow Region; Spartak-Merkury Yekaterinburg
- National team: Russia
- Playing career: 1996–2017
Medal record
World Championship
Bronze medal – third place	2001 United States
Bronze medal – third place	2013 Canada
Bronze medal – third place	2016 Canada

Yekaterina Vyachslavovna Smolentseva (Russian: Екатерина Вячеславовна Смоленцева, born 15 September 1981) is a Russian former professional ice hockey player and member of the Russian national ice hockey team. She played sixteen seasons with the Russian national team, during which she participated in four women's ice hockey tournaments at the Winter Olympic Games, in 2002, 2006, 2010, and 2014, and eleven IIHF Women's World Championships, winning bronze at the tournaments in 2001, 2013, and 2016.

Her club career, which spanned from 1996 to 2017, was played with Spartak-Merkury Yekaterinburg, SKIF Nizhni Novgorod, and Tornado Moscow Region of the Russian Women's Hockey League, the Connecticut Whale of the Premier Hockey Federation (PHF), and Agidel Ufa of the Zhenskaya Hockey League (ZhHL).

In December 2017, Smolentseva and seven other members of the 2014 Russian Olympic ice hockey squad were sanctioned for doping violations as part of the Oswald Commission. The team’s results were retroactively disqualified and the players banned for life by the IOC. All eight players filed appeals with the Court of Arbitration for Sport and the cases of five, including Smolentseva, were overturned on appeal – their results were reinstated and the lifetime bans annulled. As sanctions on three players were upheld, the disqualification of the team’s results from the 2014 Olympics remains in place.

== Playing career ==
Smolentseva appeared in the 2002, 2006, 2010 and 2014 Olympic winter games with the Russian national team. She led the Russian team in scoring at three consecutive World Championships (2007, 2008 and 2009). During the 2009 tournament, she registered six points in just three games.

=== Connecticut Whale ===
On 15 August 2015, it was announced that Smolentseva had signed a contract to play for the Connecticut Whale of the Premier Hockey Federation.

== Career statistics ==
Note: GP= Games played; G= Goals; AST= Assists; PTS = Points; PIM = Penalties in minutes; +/- = Plus Minus Rating

Event	GP	G	AST	PTS	PIM	+/-
2002 Winter Olympics	5	0	3	3	6	−1
2006 Winter Olympics	5	0	2	2	0	−2
2010 Winter Olympics	5	1	1	2	10	−3
