= Anna Shibanova =

Russian ice hockey player

Anna Shibanova Анна Шибанова
- Born: 10 November 1994 (age 31) Omsk, Russia
- Height: 1.63 m (5 ft 4 in)
- Weight: 63 kg (139 lb; 9 st 13 lb)
- Position: Defence
- Shoots: Left
- ZhHL team: Agidel Ufa
- National team: Russia
- Playing career: 2012–present
Medal record
World Championship
Bronze medal – third place	2013 Canada
Bronze medal – third place	2016 Canada
Universiade
Gold medal – first place	2017 Astana-Almaty	Ice hockey
Gold medal – first place	2019 Krasnoyarsk	Ice hockey

Anna Sergeyevna Shibanova (Russian: Анна Сергеевна Шибанова; born 10 November 1994) is a Russian ice hockey defenseman and member of the Russian national team, currently serving as an alternate captain of Agidel Ufa in the Zhenskaya Hockey League (ZhHL).

She has represented Russia at six IIHF Women's World Championships, winning bronze medals at the tournaments in 2013 and 2016, and won gold in the women's ice hockey tournaments at the Winter Universiades in 2017 and 2019.

Her twin sister Tatyana is also an ice hockey player.

== International career ==
Shibanova was selected for the Russia women's national ice hockey team in the 2014 Winter Olympics. She played in all six games, recording two assists.

In December 2017, Shibanova and seven other members of the 2014 Russian Olympic ice hockey squad were sanctioned for doping violations as part of the Oswald Commission. The team's results were retroactively disqualified and the players banned for life by the International Olympic Committee (IOC). All eight players filed appeals with the Court of Arbitration for Sport (CAS) and the cases of five were overturned on appeal but violations were confirmed in the cases of Shibanova, Inna Dyubanok, and Galina Skiba and their disqualifications upheld, however, the lifetime ban from the Olympic Games was reduced to a ban from the 2018 Winter Olympics only.

Shibanova made three appearances for the Russia women's national under-18 ice hockey team, at the IIHF World Women's U18 Championships, with the first in 2010.

== Career statistics ==
=== International ===
Year	Team	Event	Result	GP	G	A	Pts	PIM
2010	Russia U18	U18	8th	5	1	0	1	6
2011	Russia U18	U18 DI	1st	5	2	1	3	2
2012	Russia U18	U18	7th	6	0	0	0	10
2013	Russia	WC	3rd place, bronze medalist(s)	6	1	4	5	4
2014	Russia	OG	DSQ	~~6~~	~~0~~	~~2~~	~~2~~	~~6~~
2015	Russia	WC	4th	6	0	0	0	2
2016	Russia	WC	3rd place, bronze medalist(s)	6	1	0	1	4
2017	Russia	Uni	1st place, gold medalist(s)	4	3	5	8	18
2017	Russia	WC	5th	5	0	1	1	4
2019	Russia	Uni	1st place, gold medalist(s)	7	3	8	11	4
2019	Russia	WC	4th	7	0	2	2	2
2021	ROC	WC	5th	7	0	1	1	8
Junior totals				16	3	1	4	18
Senior totals				48	8	21	29	46
