= Yulia Leskina =

Russian ice hockey goaltender

Yulia Leskina Юлия Лескина
- Born: 9 February 1991 (age 35) Pervouralsk, Russian SFSR, Soviet Union
- Height: 178 cm (5 ft 10 in)
- Weight: 76 kg (168 lb; 12 st 0 lb)
- Position: Goaltender
- Caught: Left
- Played for: SK Gorny Ukhta; SKSO Yekaterinburg; Agidel Ufa; Spartak-Merkury Yekaterinburg
- National team: Russia
- Playing career: 2008–2019
Medal record
World Championship
Bronze medal – third place	2013 Canada
Universiade
Gold medal – first place	2015 Granada	Ice hockey

Yulia Sergeyevna Leskina (Russian: Юлия Сергеевна Лескина, romanized: Yuliya Sergeyevna Leskina; born 9 February 1991) is a Russian ice hockey goaltender and former member of the Russian national ice hockey team.

== International career ==
Leskina was selected to represent Russia in the 2014 Winter Olympics. She played in two games, winning both, and making twenty-eight saves on thirty shots.

As of 2014, Leskina has also appeared for Russia at one IIHF Women's World Championships. Playing one period as Russia won a bronze medal in 2013.

Leskina made two appearances for the Russia women's national under-18 ice hockey team, at the IIHF World Women's U18 Championships. The first came in 2008.

== Career statistics ==
=== International ===
Year	Team	Event	Result	GP	W	L	T/OT	MIN	GA	SO	GAA	SV%
2008	Russia U18	U18	8th	3	0	3	0	86:00	15	0	10.40	0.766
2009	Russia U18	U18	7th	2	0	2	0	53:00	12	0	13.52	0.813
2013	Russia	WC	3rd place, bronze medalist(s)	1	1	0	0	20:00	2	0	6.00	0.833
2014	Russia	OG	DSQ	2	2	0	0	93:10	2	0	1.29	0.933
