= Yekaterina Lebedeva =

Russian ice hockey player

Yekaterina Lebedeva Екатерина Лебедева
- Born: 14 September 1989 (age 37) Sverdlovsk, Russian SFSR, Soviet Union
- Height: 165 cm (5 ft 5 in)
- Weight: 64 kg (141 lb; 10 st 1 lb)
- Position: Centre
- Shoots: Left
- ZhHL team Former teams: Belye Medveditsy: SKSO Yekaterinburg; Agidel Ufa; Fakel Chelyabinsk
- National team: Russia
- Playing career: 2007–present
Medal record
World Championship
Bronze medal – third place	2013 Canada

Yekaterina Sergeyevna Lebedeva (Russian: Екатерина Сергеевна Лебедева; born 14 September 1989) is a Russian ice hockey centre, currently serving as captain of Belye Medveditsy in the Zhenskaya Hockey League (ZhHL).

On 12 December 2017, she and five other Russian ice hockey players were disqualified with their results at the 2014 Olympics annulled.

== International career ==
Lebedeva was selected for the Russia national women's ice hockey team in the 2010 Winter Olympics. She played in all five games, recording one assist.

Lebedeva has also appeared for Russia at six IIHF Women's World Championships. Her first appearance came in 2007. She was a member of the team that won a bronze medal at the 2013 IIHF Women's World Championship.

== Career statistics ==
=== International career ===
Year	Team	Event	GP	G	A	Pts	PIM
2007	Russia	WW	4	0	0	0	0
2008	Russia	WW	4	0	0	0	2
2009	Russia	WW	4	0	1	1	4
2010	Russia	Oly	5	0	1	1	2
2011	Russia	WW	6	1	0	1	0
2012	Russia	WW	5	1	0	1	2
2013	Russia	WW	6	1	4	5	0
