= Olga Sosina =

Russian ice hockey player

Olga Sosina Ольга Сосина
- Born: 27 July 1992 (age 34) Almetyevsk, Russia
- Height: 1.63 m (5 ft 4 in)
- Weight: 75 kg (165 lb; 11 st 11 lb)
- Position: Forward
- Shoots: Right
- ZhHL team Former teams: HC Agidel Ufa; SKIF Nizhny Novgorod
- National team: Russia
- Playing career: 2008–present
Medal record
World Championship
Bronze medal – third place	2013 Canada
Bronze medal – third place	2016 Canada

Olga Petrovna Sosina (Russian: Ольга Петровна Сосина; born 27 July 1992) is a Russian ice hockey forward and captain of the Russian national ice hockey team, currently serving as alternate captain of Agidel Ufa in the Zhenskaya Hockey League (ZhHL). She won bronze medals at the World Championships in 2013 and 2016. Sosina has played in the women's ice hockey tournament at three Olympic Games, first in 2010.

== International career ==
Sosina was selected for the Russian national ice hockey team at the Winter Olympics in 2010 and 2014. At the 2010 Olympics in Vancouver, she played in all five games but did not record any points. At the 2014 Olympics in Sochi, she played in all six games, recording four points (3 goals, 1 assist). Sosina served as captain of the Olympic Athletes from Russia team in the women's ice hockey tournament at the 2018 Winter Olympics.

Sosina has also represented Russia at eight IIHF Women's World Championships. Her first appearance came in 2009. She was a member of the bronze medal winning teams at the 2013 and 2016 IIHF Women's World Championships.

She also competed in three junior tournaments for the Russia women's national under-18 ice hockey team, with her first the inaugural event in 2008.

== Career statistics ==
=== International career ===
Year	Team	Event	GP	G	A	Pts	PIM
2008	Russia U18	U18	5	2	0	2	4
2009	Russia U18	U18	5	5	1	6	10
2009	Russia	WW	3	1	0	1	0
2010	Russia U18	U18	5	3	1	4	4
2010	Russia	Oly	5	0	0	0	2
2011	Russia	WW	6	1	2	3	0
2012	Russia	WW	4	0	0	0	2
2013	Russia	WW	3	0	0	0	0
