= 2012 IIHF Women's World Championship rosters =

Each team's roster for the 2012 IIHF Women's World Championship consisted of at least 15 skaters (forwards, and defencemen) and 2 goaltenders, and at most 20 skaters and 3 goaltenders. All eight participating nations, through the confirmation of their respective national associations, had to submit a roster by the first IIHF directorate meeting on 6 April 2012.

== Canada ==
- Head coach: Dan Church (CAN)

=== Skaters ===
Number	Position	Player	Club	GP	G	A	Pts	PIM	+/−
2	F	Meghan Agosta	(Canada) Montreal Stars	5	4	4	8	8	+3
3	D	Jocelyne Larocque	(United States) University of Minnesota Duluth	5	0	1	1	6	+8
5	D	Lauriane Rougeau	(United States) Cornell University	5	1	1	2	2	+3
6	F	Rebecca Johnston	(United States) Cornell University	5	1	6	7	0	+5
8	D	Laura Fortino	(United States) Cornell University	5	2	2	4	6	+9
10	D	Gillian Apps	(Canada) Brampton Thunder	5	2	2	4	10	+4
11	D	Courtney Birchard	(Canada) Brampton Thunder	5	1	0	1	2	−1
12	D	Meaghan Mikkelson	(Canada) Alberta University	5	0	5	5	2	+1
13	F	Caroline Ouellette	(Canada) Montreal Stars	5	4	5	9	6	+6
16	F	Jayna Hefford	(Canada) Brampton Thunder	5	3	6	9	4	+7
17	F	Bailey Bram	(United States) Mercyhurst College	5	0	1	1	4	0
18	D	Catherine Ward	(Canada) Montreal Stars	5	0	2	2	4	+4
19	F	Brianne Jenner	(United States) Cornell University	5	0	1	1	0	+2
20	F	Jenn Wakefield	(United States) Boston University	5	1	0	1	8	−1
21	F	Haley Irwin	(United States) University of Minnesota Duluth	1	0	0	0	0	−1
22	F	Hayley Wickenheiser	(Canada) Calgary University	5	3	7	10	4	+4
24	F	Natalie Spooner	(United States) Ohio State University	5	4	2	6	4	+4
25	D	Tessa Bonhomme	(Canada) Toronto Furies	5	0	1	1	2	+4
28	F	Vicki Bendus	(United States) Brampton Thunder	5	0	1	1	0	+1
29	F	Marie-Philip Poulin	(United States) Boston University	5	3	4	7	6	+7

=== Goaltenders ===
Number	Player	Club	GP	W	L	Min	GA	GAA	SA	SV%	SO
1	Shannon Szabados	(Canada) Northern Alberta Institute	4	2	0	198:18	9	2.72	85	89.41	0
31	Geneviève Lacasse	(United States) Providence College	0	0	0	00:00	0	0.00	0	00.00	0
32	Charline Labonté	(Canada) McGill University	2	1	1	103:32	8	4.64	29	72.41	0

== Finland ==
- Head coach: Pekka Hämäläinen (FIN)

=== Skaters ===
Number	Position	Player	Club	GP	G	A	Pts	PIM	+/−
2	D	Anna Kilponen	(Finland) Team Kuortane	6	0	0	0	0	−1
4	D	Rosa Lindstedt	(Finland) Ilves Tampere	6	1	0	1	6	−5
5	F	Anni Rantanen	(Finland) Ilves Tampere	6	0	0	0	0	−5
6	D	Jenni Hiirikoski	(Russia) SKIF Nizhny Novgorod	6	0	5	5	2	−5
7	D	Mira Jalosuo	(United States) University of Minnesota	5	0	1	1	4	−4
8	D	Tea Villila	(United States) University of Minnesota Duluth	6	0	1	1	6	−5
9	F	Venla Hovi	(Finland) HPK	6	1	1	2	4	−9
10	D	Essi Hallvar	(Finland) Blues Espoo	6	0	0	0	0	−3
11	F	Anniina Rajahuhta	(Finland) HPK	6	1	0	1	2	−4
12	F	Susanna Tapani	(Finland) HPK	6	1	0	1	2	−7
15	F	Minttu Tuominen	(United States) Ohio State University	6	0	0	0	4	−6
18	F	Venla Kotkaslahti	(Finland) Team Kuortane	6	0	0	0	0	+1
19	D	Terhi Mertanen	(Switzerland) ZSC Lions	6	0	3	3	0	−5
20	D	Saija Tarkki	(Finland) Oulun Kärpät	6	0	1	1	4	−3
21	F	Michelle Karvinen	(United States) University of North Dakota	6	0	5	5	4	−5
23	F	Nina Tikkinen	(Finland) Oulun Kärpät	6	2	0	2	6	−5
26	F	Henna Savikuja	(Finland) Oulun Kärpät	6	0	0	0	0	0
27	F	Anne Helin	(Finland) Oulun Kärpät	6	1	1	2	10	−6
28	F	Saana Valkama	(Finland) Team Kuortane	6	0	0	0	2	−1
29	F	Karoliina Rantamäki	(Russia) SKIF Nizhny Novgorod	6	5	0	5	2	−3

=== Goaltenders ===
Number	Player	Club	GP	W	L	Min	GA	GAA	SA	SV%	SO
30	Meeri Raisanen	(Finland) JYP Jyväskylä	3	1	0	98:42	9	5.47	45	80.00	0
31	Isabella Portnoj	(Finland) Blues Espoo	1	0	1	25:50	6	13.94	26	76.92	0
41	Noora Räty	(United States) University of Minnesota	4	1	3	234:48	15	3.83	155	90.32	0

== Germany ==
- Head coach: Peter Kathan (GER)

=== Skaters ===
Number	Position	Player	Club	GP	G	A	Pts	PIM	+/−
2	F	Kerstin Spielberger	(Germany) EHC Waldkraiburg	5	0	0	0	4	+1
4	D	Jessica Hammerl	(Germany) ESC Planegg	5	0	0	0	6	−1
5	F	Manuela Anwander	(Germany) EV Landsberg	5	2	0	2	2	0
6	F	Bettina Evers	(Germany) ESC Planegg	5	1	0	1	0	+2
7	F	Nina Kamenik	(Germany) OSC Berlin	5	0	1	1	2	−1
8	F	Julia Zorn	(Germany) EC Peiting	5	4	0	4	2	+2
10	D	Anja Weisser	(Canada) University of Prince Edward Island	5	0	0	0	2	0
11	D	Britta Schroder	(Germany) EC Bergkamen	5	0	0	0	0	−2
12	F	Susann Gotz	(Germany) FASS Berlin	5	0	3	3	4	+3
15	F	Andrea Lanzl	(Germany) EC Bergkamen	5	0	1	1	2	+2
16	D	Rebecca Graeve	(Germany) Iserlohn Roosters	5	0	0	0	0	−1
17	F	Sara Seiler	(Canada) Carleton University	5	0	1	1	0	−1
18	D	Susanne Fellner	(Germany) Memmingen Indians	5	0	2	2	0	−1
20	D	Daria Gleissner	(Germany) Memmingen Indians	5	0	0	0	4	0
21	D	Ronja Richter	(Germany) ESC Planegg	5	0	0	0	4	+2
23	D	Tanja Eisenschmid	(Germany) Memmingen Indians	5	1	0	1	6	0
24	F	Lisa Schuster	(Germany) ESC Planegg	5	1	0	1	2	−1
25	F	Franziska Busch	(Germany) OSC Berlin	5	0	2	2	2	−2
26	F	Monika Bittner	(Germany) ESC Planegg	5	1	0	1	0	−2
28	D	Sarah Weyand	(Germany) GSC Moers	5	1	0	1	0	0

=== Goaltenders ===
Number	Player	Club	GP	W	L	Min	GA	GAA	SA	SV%	SO
1	Ivonne Schroder	(Germany) Tornado Niesky	0	0	0	00:00	0	0.00	0	00.00	0
29	Viona Harrer	(Germany) TSV Erding	3	2	1	185:00	7	2.27	82	91.46	0
30	Jennifer Harss	(United States) University of Minnesota Duluth	2	1	1	120:24	3	1.50	69	95.65	0

== Russia ==
- Head coach: Valentin Gureyev (RUS)

=== Skaters ===
Number	Position	Player	Club	GP	G	A	Pts	PIM	+/−
2	D	Angelina Goncharenko	(Russia) Belye Medvedi Moscow	5	1	0	1	6	−6
4	D	Maria Pechnikova	(Russia) SKIF Nizhni Novgorod	5	0	0	0	2	−2
7	F	Olga Sosina	(Russia) SKIF Nizhni Novgorod	4	0	0	0	2	−4
8	F	Iya Gavrilova	(Canada) Calgary University	5	0	3	3	2	−4
9	F	Alexandra Vafina	(United States) University of Minnesota Duluth	5	0	0	0	2	−8
10	F	Liudmila Belyakova	(Russia) Severnaya Zvezda Moscow	5	0	0	0	12	−10
11	F	Marina Sergina	(Russia) Tornado Moscow Region	5	0	1	1	8	−3
15	D	Olga Permyakova	(Russia) Tornado Moscow Region	5	0	0	0	4	−8
17	F	Valeria Pavlova	(Russia) Gazovik Tyumen	5	0	1	1	0	−4
19	F	Yekaterina Ananina	(Russia) Fakel Chelyabinsk	5	0	0	0	4	−2
21	D	Anna Shukina	(Russia) Tornado Moscow Region	5	0	1	1	2	−4
22	D	Zoya Polunina	(Russia) Tornado Moscow Region	5	0	0	0	0	0
23	F	Tatyana Burina	(Russia) Tornado Moscow Region	5	3	1	4	6	−4
24	F	Yevgenia Dyupina	(Russia) Serebryanye Akuly Moscow	5	0	1	1	2	−3
25	F	Yekaterina Lebedeva	(Russia) Fakel Chelyabinsk	5	1	0	1	2	−5
27	D	Inna Dyubanok	(Russia) Tornado Moscow Region	5	1	2	3	8	−5
28	F	Yekaterina Smolina	(Russia) Tornado Moscow Region	5	0	0	0	2	−1
34	D	Svetlana Tkachyova	(Russia) Tornado Moscow Region	5	0	0	0	2	−4
44	D	Alexandra Kapustina	(Russia) SKIF Nizhni Novgorod	5	0	0	0	6	−8
55	F	Galina Skiba	(Russia) Tornado Moscow Region	5	1	1	2	2	−4

=== Goaltenders ===
Number	Player	Club	GP	W	L	Min	GA	GAA	SA	SV%	SO
1	Anna Prugova	(Russia) Tornado Moscow Region	4	0	4	219:22	16	4.36	120	86.67	0
20	Valentina Ostrovlyanchik	(Russia) SKIF Nizhni Novgorod	2	0	1	34:56	10	17.18	32	68.75	0
33	Margarita Monakhova	(Russia) Odintsovo Moscow Region	1	0	0	45:04	9	1.98	28	67.86	0

== Slovakia ==
- Head coach: Miroslav Karafiát (SVK)

=== Skaters ===
Number	Position	Player	Club	GP	G	A	Pts	PIM	+/−
4	D	Petra Orszaghová	(Slovakia) HC Slovan Bratislava	5	0	0	0	4	−3
6	F	Jana Kapustová	(Russia) Tornado Moscow Region	5	2	3	5	4	−2
7	D	Barbora Bremová	(Slovakia) HC Slovan Bratislava	5	0	0	0	0	−4
9	D	Denisa Lalíková	(Slovakia) HK Puchov	5	0	0	0	0	+2
11	D	Edita Raková	(Slovakia) HC Slovan Bratislava	3	0	0	0	0	0
12	F	Maria Herichová	(Slovakia) HC Slovan Bratislava	5	0	2	2	2	−3
13	F	Petra Jurcová	(Slovakia) HC Slovan Bratislava	5	0	0	0	4	−3
14	D	Anna Dzurnaková	(Slovakia) HC Slovan Bratislava	5	0	0	0	0	−3
16	F	Miriam Mikesová	(Slovakia) HK Topoľčany	5	0	0	0	0	0
17	F	Martina Veličková	(Belarus) Pantera Minsk	5	2	0	2	4	−1
18	F	Janka Culiková	(Slovakia) HC Slovan Bratislava	5	0	0	0	4	+1
19	D	Iveta Karafiátová	(Slovakia) HC Slovan Bratislava	5	1	1	2	8	+1
22	F	Nikola Gapová	(Czech Republic) SK Karviná	5	0	0	0	0	0
23	D	Barbora Kezmarská	(Slovakia) HC Slovan Bratislava	5	0	0	0	2	−4
25	D	Gabriela Zitnaská	(Slovakia) SHK 37 Piestany	5	0	0	0	0	−2
27	F	Viktória Ihnaťová	(Slovakia) HC Slovan Bratislava	4	0	0	0	2	0
28	F	Nicol Čupková	(Russia) Agidel Ufa	5	3	3	6	2	−1
29	F	Alica Mihaliková	(United States) Rice Memorial High School	5	0	0	0	2	−4
30	F	Lenka Sroková	(Slovakia) HK Spišská Nová Ves	5	0	0	0	0	−3
71	F	Livia Lucová	(Slovakia) Šarišanka Prešov	5	0	0	0	0	−1

=== Goaltenders ===
Number	Player	Club	GP	W	L	Min	GA	GAA	SA	SV%	SO
1	Zuzana Tomčíková	(United States) Bemidji State University	5	1	4	304:43	14	2.76	177	92.09	0
2	Monika Kvaková	(Slovakia) HC Slovan Bratislava	0	0	0	00:00	0	0.00	0	00.00	0
33	Jana Budajová	(Slovakia) HK Poprad	0	0	0	00:00	0	0.00	0	00.00	0

== Sweden ==
- Head coach: Niclas Högberg (SWE)

=== Skaters ===
Number	Position	Player	Club	GP	G	A	Pts	PIM	+/−
2	F	Elin Holmlöv	(Russia) Tornado Moscow Region	5	4	3	7	6	+5
3	D	Frida Nevalainen	(Russia) SKIF Nizhni Novgorod	5	0	2	2	2	+1
4	D	Jenni Asserholt	(Sweden) Linköpings HC	5	2	5	7	10	+5
5	D	Johanna Fallman	(Sweden) Modo Hockey	4	0	1	1	0	0
7	D	Johanna Olofsson	(Sweden) Modo Hockey	5	1	0	1	4	+1
8	F	Erika Holst	(Sweden) Segeltorps IF	5	2	2	4	2	+1
9	F	Tina Enström	(Sweden) Modo Hockey	4	0	0	0	0	−3
10	D	Emilia Andersson	(United States) Minnesota State	5	0	0	0	0	0
11	F	Erica Udén Johansson	(United States) Quinnipiac University	5	1	0	1	0	+2
12	D	Linnea Hedin	(Sweden) Segeltorps IF	5	0	0	0	0	0
13	F	Lina Wester	(Sweden) Leksands IF	5	0	1	1	14	−1
16	F	Pernilla Winberg	(United States) University of Minnesota	4	1	3	4	6	+1
17	D	Linnea Backman	(Sweden) AIK IF	5	0	2	2	0	+2
19	F	Klara Myrén	(United States) University of Vermont	5	0	1	1	0	+1
20	D	Annie Svedin	(United States) Ohio State University	5	1	0	1	2	+2
21	F	Rebecca Stenberg	(Sweden) Munksund Skuthamn SK	5	0	0	0	0	−1
24	F	Erika Grahm	(Sweden) Modo Hockey	5	0	1	1	0	−1
27	F	Michelle Lowenhielm	(Sweden) AIK IF	5	0	1	1	2	0
28	F	Danijela Rundqvist	(Russia) Tornado Moscow Region	5	0	0	0	0	−2
29	F	Gizela Blom	(Sweden) AIK IF	5	0	0	0	2	0

=== Goaltenders ===
Number	Player	Club	GP	W	L	Min	GA	GAA	SA	SV%	SO
1	Sara Grahn	(Sweden) Brynäs IF	2	1	1	120:01	3	1.50	54	94.44	0
30	Kim Martin	(Russia) Tornado Moscow Region	3	2	1	179:48	5	1.67	55	91.67	0
35	Valentina Lizana	(Sweden) Modo Hockey	0	0	0	00:00	0	0.00	0	00.00	0

== Switzerland ==
- Head coach: René Kammerer (SUI)

=== Skaters ===
Number	Position	Player	Club	GP	G	A	Pts	PIM	+/−
2	F	Katrin Nabholz	(Switzerland) ZSC Lions	6	1	1	2	0	−2
6	D	Julia Marty	(Switzerland) SC Reinach	6	5	2	7	6	+5
7	F	Darcia Leimgruber	(Switzerland) ZSC Lions	6	1	3	4	6	+2
8	F	Andrea Fischer	(Switzerland) EV Bomo Thun	6	0	0	0	0	−3
9	F	Stefanie Marty	(Switzerland) SC Reinach	6	2	4	6	10	+7
10	D	Nicole Bullo	(Switzerland) HC Lugano	6	1	2	3	4	+6
11	D	Angela Frautschi	(Switzerland) ZSC Lions	6	0	2	2	8	−1
13	F	Sara Benz	(Switzerland) ZSC Lions	6	2	2	4	2	+1
15	F	Monika Waidacher	(United States) College of St Scholastica	6	0	0	0	2	0
16	F	Nina Waidacher	(United States) College of St Scholastica	6	0	0	0	0	−5
17	F	Sarah Forster	(Switzerland) HC Ajoie	4	0	0	0	0	0
18	F	Evelina Raselli	(Switzerland) HC Lugano	6	2	0	2	6	−3
19	D	Rahel Michielin	(Switzerland) SC Reinach	6	0	0	0	2	−6
20	F	Kathrin Lehmann	(Germany) ESC Planegg	6	2	3	5	4	+5
22	D	Johanna Vuille dit Bille	(Germany) OSC Berlin	6	0	0	0	0	−3
24	D	Sabrina Zollinger	(Switzerland) EHC Winterthur	6	0	1	1	2	−2
63	F	Anja Stiefel	(Switzerland) SC Reinach	6	1	2	3	2	−2
88	F	Phoebe Stanz	(Switzerland) Kloten Flyers	6	1	1	2	6	−3
92	D	Sandra Thalmann	(Switzerland) DHC Langenthal	5	0	0	0	8	−1
96	F	Martina Steck	(Switzerland) DHC Langenthal	6	0	1	1	0	−1

=== Goaltenders ===
Number	Player	Club	GP	W	L	Min	GA	GAA	SA	SV%	SO
28	Sophie Anthamatten	(Switzerland) EHC Saastal	2	0	1	70:58	4	3.38	37	89.19	0
33	Dominique Slongo	(Switzerland) EHC Brandis	0	0	0	00:00	0	0.00	0	00.00	0
41	Florence Schelling	(United States) Northeastern University	5	4	1	288:23	16	3.33	235	93.19	0

== United States ==
- Head coach: Katey Stone (USA)

=== Skaters ===
Number	Position	Player	Club	GP	G	A	Pts	PIM	+/−
2	F	Erika Lawler	(United States) Boston Blades	5	1	0	1	0	+1
6	F	Jillian Dempsey	(United States) Harvard University	4	0	0	0	0	+1
7	F	Monique Lamoureux-Kolls	(United States) University of North Dakota	5	7	7	14	6	+9
11	D	Lisa Chesson	(United States) College Hockey America	5	0	3	3	0	+9
12	F	Jenny Potter	(United States) Minnesota Whitecaps	5	0	3	3	0	+4
13	F	Julie Chu	(Canada) Montreal Stars	5	2	1	3	2	+3
14	F	Brianna Decker	(United States) University of Wisconsin	5	4	6	10	6	+13
15	D	Anne Schleper	(United States) University of Minnesota Duluth	5	0	2	2	0	+9
16	F	Kelli Stack	(United States) Boston Blades	5	5	8	13	2	+6
17	F	Jocelyne Lamoureux	(United States) University of North Dakota	5	4	5	9	8	+7
19	D	Gisele Marvin	(United States) Boston Blades	5	3	6	9	2	+4
20	F	Hannah Brandt	(United States) Hill Murray School	5	0	0	0	0	+1
21	F	Hilary Knight	(United States) University of Wisconsin	5	5	2	7	0	+5
22	D	Kacey Bellamy	(United States) Boston Blades	5	0	1	1	6	+2
23	D	Michelle Picard	(United States) Harvard University	4	0	1	1	0	+5
24	D	Josephine Pucci	(United States) Harvard University	5	3	3	6	4	+8
25	D	Megan Bozek	(United States) University of Minnesota Duluth	5	2	3	5	0	+8
26	F	Kendall Coyne	(United States) Northeastern University	5	4	5	9	0	+10
27	F	Taylor Wasylk	(United States) Boston College	2	0	0	0	0	0
28	F	Amanda Kessel	(United States) University of Minnesota	5	3	7	10	0	+9

=== Goaltenders ===
Number	Player	Club	GP	W	L	Min	GA	GAA	SA	SV%	SO
1	Molly Schaus	(United States) Boston Blades	3	1	1	181:50	7	2.31	70	90.00	1
29	Brianne McLaughlin	(Canada) Burlington Barracudas	1	1	0	60:00	0	0.00	9	100.00	1
31	Jessica Vetter	(United States) College Hockey America	1	1	0	60:00	0	0.00	5	100.00	1
