= IIHF European Women's Champions Cup =

Women's ice hockey club championship tournament

European Women Champions Cup

Tournament information
- Sport: Ice hockey
- Location: Europe
- Established: 2004; 21 years ago
- Defunct: 2015; 10 years ago
- Number of tournaments: 11
- Administrator: International Ice Hockey Federation

Tournament statistics
- First champion: (Sweden) AIK IF
- Most titles: (Sweden) AIK IF (4) (Russia) HC Tornado (4)

Final champion
- (Russia) SKIF Nizhny Novgorod

The IIHF European Women's Champions Cup or EWCC was an annual women's ice hockey club tournament, contested by the national women's ice hockey champions from several European ice hockey playing nations. The event was established and organized by the International Ice Hockey Federation (IIHF). The competition format included two group phases followed by a final round. Each phase was played as a round robin in groups of four teams each.

== History ==
The competition was created by the IIHF in 2004, at the same time as a similar competition for men's hockey teams. The first winner was AIK IF of the Swedish Division I. This Swedish club team then won the following three tournaments. From 2009 onward, the IIHF European Women's Champions Cup was won by teams from the Russian Women's Hockey League, with the exception of the 2010–11 tournament, which was won by Ilves Tampere of the Finnish Naisten Liiga.

At its zenith, national champion teams from twenty countries participated in the qualification round and/or second round of the EWCC. However, only teams from Czechia, Finland, Germany, Kazakhstan, Russia, Sweden, or Switzerland ever qualified for the final round of a tournament.

== Finalists and champions ==
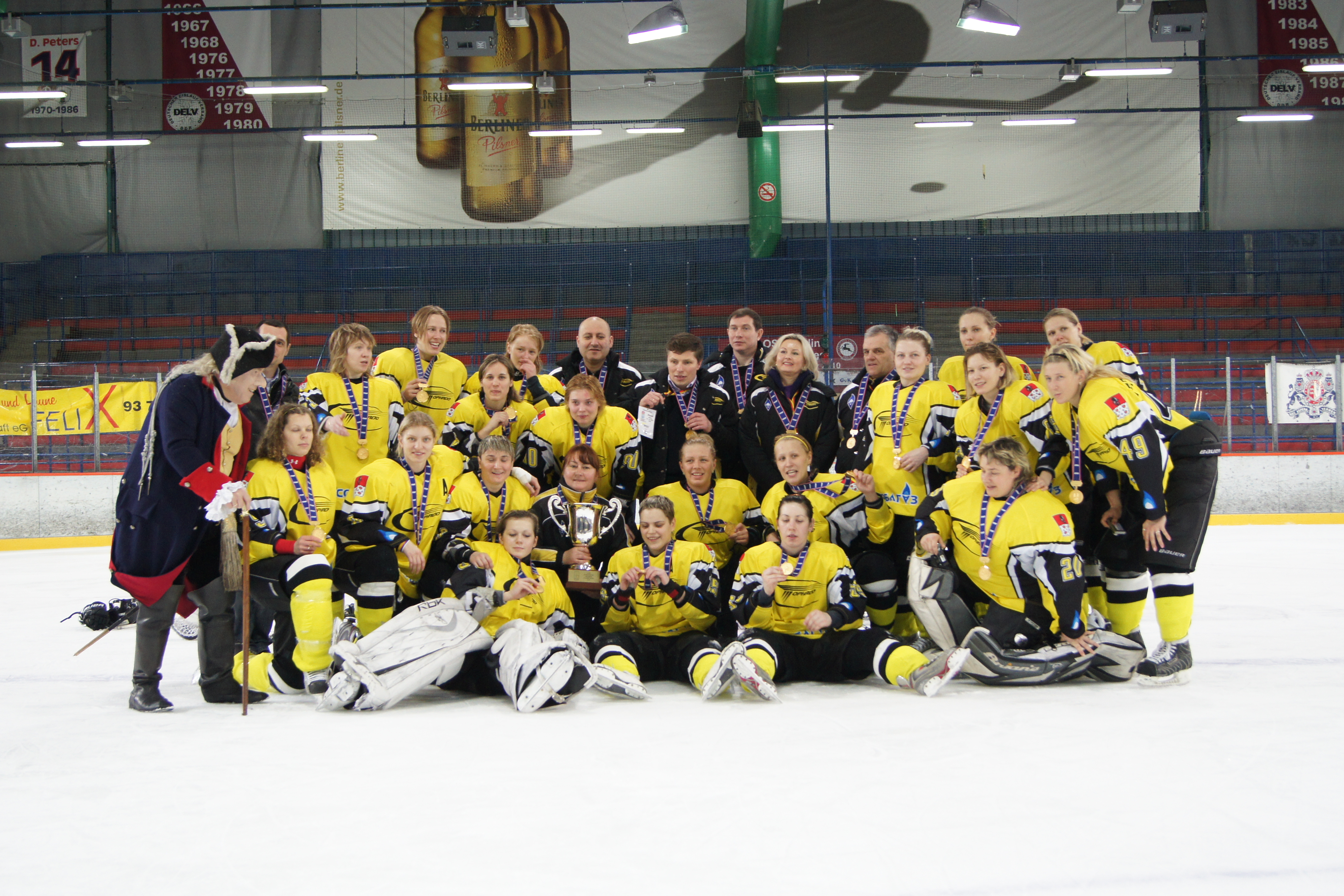
The EWCC 2010 champions, HC Tornado, in Russia

Years	Gold	Silver	Bronze	Fourth	Host city (Finals)
2004–05	(Sweden) AIK IF	(Russia) HC SKIF Moscow	(Switzerland) EV Zug	(Finland) Espoo Blues	(Sweden) Solna
2005–06	(Sweden) AIK IF	(Finland) Espoo Blues	(Russia) HC SKIF Moscow	(Switzerland) EV Zug	(Sweden) Solna
2006–07	(Sweden) AIK IF	(Russia) HC Tornado	(Sweden) Segeltorps IF	(Finland) Ilves Tampere	(Sweden) Katrineholm
2007–08	(Sweden) AIK IF	(Finland) Espoo Blues	(Kazakhstan) Aisulu Almaty	(Switzerland) HC Lugano	(Sweden) Vallentuna
2008–09	(Russia) SKIF Nizhny Novgorod	(Sweden) Segeltorps IF	(Finland) Espoo Blues	(Kazakhstan) Aisulu Almaty	(Finland) Lohja
2009–10	(Russia) HC Tornado	(Finland) Espoo Blues	(Germany) OSC Berlin	(Czech Republic) HC Slavia Praha	(Germany) Berlin
2010–11	(Finland) Ilves Tampere	(Russia) SKIF Nizhny Novgorod	(Switzerland) HC Lugano	(Kazakhstan) Aisulu Almaty	(Switzerland) Lugano
2011–12	(Russia) HC Tornado	(Switzerland) ZSC Lions Frauen	(Finland) HPK Hämeenlinna	(Germany) ESC Planegg	(Finland) Hämeenlinna
2012–13	(Russia) HC Tornado	(Sweden) MODO Hockey	(Finland) Kärpät Oulu	(Switzerland) ZSC Lions Frauen	(Finland) Oulu
2013–14	(Russia) HC Tornado	(Sweden) AIK IF	(Finland) Espoo Blues	(Germany) ESC Planegg	(Germany) Bad Tölz
2014–15	(Russia) SKIF Nizhny Novgorod	(Sweden) Linköpings HC	(Finland) Espoo Blues	(Switzerland) HC Lugano	(Finland) Espoo

== Medals ==
Rank	Nation	Gold	Silver	Bronze	Total
1	Russia	6	3	1	10
2	Sweden	4	4	1	9
3	Finland	1	3	5	9
4	Switzerland	0	1	2	3
5	Germany	0	0	1	1
5	Kazakhstan	0	0	1	1
Totals (6 entries)		11	11	11	33

== Cup champion rosters ==
=== 2004–05 ===
(Sweden) AIK IF	Goaltenders: Kim Martin, Jessica Sandén Defensemen: Malin Åberg, Emilia Andersson, Emelie Berggren, Frida Hemstad, Elin Holmlöv, Andréa Morger, Linn Risendahl, Henrietta Varviharju Forwards: Gizela Bloom, Desirée Byström, Lisa Flemström, Nanna Hamell, Caroline Hammerheim, Maria Hortell, Angelica Lorsell, Emilie O'Konor, Josefin Rudberg, Danijela Rundqvist, Katarina Timglas, Pernilla Winberg, Sofia Wöchtl, Sophie Zakrisson Head coach: Joachim Ahlgren

=== 2005–06 ===
(Sweden) AIK IF	Goaltenders: Valentina Lizana, Kim Martin Defensemen: Malin Åberg, Emilia Andersson, Emelie Berggren, Elin Holmlöv, Sara Lindquist, Andréa Morger, Henrietta Varviharju Forwards: Gizela Bloom, Desirée Byström, Lisa Flemström, Nanna Hamell, Isabelle Jordansson, Angelica Lorsell, Emilie O'Konor, Danijela Rundqvist, Katarina Timglas, Pernilla Winberg, Sophie Zakrisson Head coach: John Banarp

=== 2006–07 ===
(Sweden) AIK IF	Goaltenders: Annica Åhlén, Valentina Lizana Defensemen: Malin Åberg, Emilia Andersson, Linnéa Bäckman, Emelie Berggren, Marte Harmens, Sara Lindquist, Katarina Timglas Forwards: Gizela Bloom, Sandra Claesson, Deborah Eckefjord, Nanna Hamell, Nanna Jansson, Isabelle Jordansson, Maria Rooth, Danijela Rundqvist, Malin Sonefors, Pernilla Winberg, Henrietta Varviharju Head coach: Mikael Gustafsson

=== 2007–08 ===
(Sweden) AIK IF	Goaltenders: Josephin Lennström, Madeleine Schelander Defensemen: Emilia Andersson, Linnéa Bäckman, Emelie Berggren, Maria Hortell, Hanna Lindström, Katarina Timglas, Suvi Vacker Forwards: Maritta Becker, Gizela Bloom, Sandra Claesson, Deborah Eckefjord, Nanna Hamell, Isabelle Jordansson, Kathrin Lehmann, Maria Rooth, Danijela Rundqvist, Malin Sonefors, Pernilla Winberg Head coach: Henrik Cedergren

=== 2008–09 ===
(Russia) SKIF Nizhny Novgorod	Goaltenders: Nadezhda Alexandrova, Alyona Kropachyova Defensemen: Jenni Hiirikoski, Alexandra Kapustina, Alena Khomich, Kati Kovalainen, Viktoria Samarina, Anna Shchukina, Larisa Teplygina Forwards: Yulia Deulina, Yelena Guslistaya, Karoliina Rantamäki, Olga Semenets, Yelena Silina, Olga Sosina, Tatiana Sotnikova, Svetlana Terentyeva, Svetlana Tkacheva, Oxana Tretiyakova, Marjo Voutilainen Head coach: Evgeni Bobariko

=== 2009–10 ===
(Russia) HC Tornado	Goaltenders: Irina Gashennikova, Anna Prugova Defensemen: Correne Bredin, Inna Dyubanok, Olga Permyakova, Kristina Petrovskaia, Zoïa Polounina, Natalia Puzikova, Mariya Skvortsova Forwards: Tatiana Burina, Iya Gavrilova, Jana Kapustová, Iveta Koka, Svetlana Kolmykova, Petra Pravlíková, Marina Sergina, Galina Skiba, Yekaterina Smolentseva, Yekaterina Smolina Head coach: Alexei Chistyakov

=== 2010–11 ===
(Finland) Ilves Tampere	Goaltenders: Linda Selkee, Viivi Vartia Defensemen: Emma Haataja, Merja Halmetoja, Anna Kilponen, Rosa Lindstedt, Heidi Pelttari, Mari Saarinen, Hanna-Riikka Turpeinen Forwards: Reetta Aavasalo, Johanna Koivula, Venla Kotkaslahti, Sari Kärnä, Tawni Mattila, Heli Myllymäki, Anni Rantanen, Jenna Suokko, Saara Tuominen Head coach: Samuli Marjeta

=== 2011–12 ===
(Russia) HC Tornado	Goaltenders: Kim Martin, Anna Prugova Defensemen: Inna Dyubanok, Yekaterina Nikolayeva, Olga Permyakova, Kristina Petrovskaya, Zoya Polunina, Anna Shukina, Svetlana Tkachyova Forwards: Tatiana Burina, Elin Holmlöv, Melissa Jaques, Jana Kapustová, Svetlana Kolmykova, Danijela Rundqvist, Marina Sergina, Maria Shepelinskaya, Galina Skiba, Yekaterina Smolina Head coach: Alexei Chistyakov

=== 2012–13 ===
(Russia) HC Tornado	Goaltenders: Anna Prugova, Zuzana Tomčíková Defensemen: Inna Dyubanok, Yekaterina Nikolayeva, Olga Permyakova, Kristina Petrovskaya, Zoya Polunina, Anna Shukina, Svetlana Tkachyova Forwards: Tatiana Burina, Jana Kapustová, Svetlana Kolmykova, Yekaterina Pashkevich, Danijela Rundqvist, Marina Sergina, Anna Shokhina, Galina Skiba, Yekaterina Smolina, Yekaterina Smolentseva Head coach: Alexei Chistyakov

=== 2013–14 ===
(Russia) HC Tornado	Goaltenders: Anna Prugova, Zuzana Tomčíková Defensemen: Yekaterina Nikolayeva, Olga Permyakova, Nina Pirogova, Zoya Polunina, Anna Shukina, Brittany Simpson, Svetlana Tkacheva Forwards: Xenia Bocharova, Tatyana Burina, Iya Gavrilova, Svetlana Kolmykova, Marina Sergina, Anna Shokhina, Galina Skiba, Yekaterina Smolina, Yekaterina Smolentseva, Kelley Steadman Head coach: Alexei Chistyakov

=== 2014–15 ===
(Russia) SKIF Nizhny Novgorod	Goaltenders: Meeri Räisänen, Irina Gachennikova Defensemen: Maria Bodrikova, Mira Jalosuo, Alexandra Kapustina, Maria Pechnikova, Anastasia Smirnova, Larisa Teplygina Forwards: Maria Belova, Landysh Falyakhova, Yekaterina Likhachyova, Maria Nadezhdina, Alsu Rakhimova, Karoliina Rantamäki, Olga Semenets, Nadezhda Shiryayevna, Yelena Silina, Olga Sosina, Anna Timofeyeva Head coach: Oleg Namestnikov

== Best Players Selected by the Directorate ==
^ = Second-time Best Player selection

Season	Best Goalkeeper		Best Defenceman		Best Forward		ref
Season	Player	Team	Player	Team	Player	Team	ref
2004–05	Kim Martin	(Sweden) AIK IF	Päivi Halonen	(Finland) Espoo Blues	Danijela Rundqvist	(Sweden) AIK IF	
2005–06	Kim Martin^	(Sweden) AIK IF	Emma Laaksonen	(Finland) Espoo Blues	Daniela Díaz	(Switzerland) EV Zug	
2006–07	Record not available						
2007–08	Noora Räty	(Finland) Espoo Blues	Tatyana Shtelmaister	(Kazakhstan) Aisulu Almaty	Pernilla Winberg	(Sweden) AIK IF	
2008–09	Alexandra Kyobe	(Sweden) Segeltorps IF	Jenni Hiirikoski	(Russia) SKIF Nizhny Novgorod	Erika Holst	(Sweden) Segeltorps IF	
2009–10	Ivonne Schröder	(Germany) OSC Berlin	Emma Laaksonen^	(Finland) Espoo Blues	Iya Gavrilova	(Russia) HC Tornado	
2010–11	Darya Obydennova	(Kazakhstan) Aisulu Almaty	Nicole Bullo	(Switzerland) HC Lugano	Saara Tuominen	(Finland) Tampereen Ilves	
2011–12	Anna Vanhatalo	(Switzerland) ZSC Lions Frauen	Inna Dyubanok	(Russia) HC Tornado	Melissa Jaques	(Russia) HC Tornado	
2012–13	Zuzana Tomčíková	(Russia) HC Tornado	Malin Sjogren	(Sweden) MODO Hockey	Anne Helin	(Finland) Kärpät Oulu	
2013–14	Zuzana Tomčíková^	(Russia) HC Tornado	Kathrin Lehmann	(Germany) ESC Planegg	Kelley Steadman	(Russia) HC Tornado	
2014–15	Meeri Räisänen	(Russia) SKIF Nizhny Novgorod	Mira Jalosuo	(Russia) SKIF Nizhny Novgorod	Anja Stiefel	(Switzerland) HC Lugano	

== See also ==
- EWHL Super Cup
- IIHF European Women Championships
- IIHF Women's World Championship
- European Women's Hockey League
