= 2013–14 IIHF European Women's Champions Cup =

International ice hockey club tournament

Tournament details
- Host countries: Germany; Finland; France; Latvia; Slovakia; Slovenia
- Venues: 6 (in 6 host cities)
- Dates: Round 1; 18–20 October 2013; Round 2; 6–8 December 2013; Finals; 14–16 March 2014
- Format: Round-robin
- Teams: 20

Final positions
- Champions: (Russia) Tornado Moscow Region (4th title)
- Runners-up: (Sweden) AIK
- Third place: (Finland) Espoo Blues
- Fourth place: (Germany) ESC Planegg

Tournament statistics
- Games played: 84
- Goals scored: 362 (4.31 per game)
- Scoring leader(s): Finals; Kelley Steadman, Tornado Moscow Region (6 points)

The 2013–14 IIHF European Women's Champions Cup was the tenth holding of the IIHF European Women Champions Cup (EWCC). Russian team Tornado Moscow Region (HC Tornado) of the Russian Women's Hockey League won the tournament for the third consecutive time and the fourth time in five years. With their victory, HK Tornado tied AIK Hockey for most EWCC titles won by a single club.

The tournament was played in three stages: Round 1, Round 2, and the Finals. Round 1 comprised sixteen national champions, sorted into four groups of four teams each; only the winner of each group progressed. Round 2 comprised eight teams in two groups of four teams each. Each group included two group winners from Round 1 and the national champions from two of the four countries represented in the Finals of the 2012–13 IIHF European Women's Champions Cup, which had received a bye for Round 1. The teams finishing in the top two positions of each group in Round 2 moved on to the Finals.

It is likely that “Best Players Selected by the Directorate” were named for each group in all three rounds, based on documents available from other EWCC tournaments, but information about the selections for 2013–14 Groups A–E is apparently lost.

== Round 1 ==
Sixteen national champions played in the first round, in four groups of four teams each. All of the first round groups played during 18–20 October 2013. The winner of each group progressed to Round 2.

=== Group A ===
Group A was hosted in Neuilly-sur-Marne, France, and all games were played at the Patinoire municipale de Neuilly-sur-Marne (Municipal Ice Rink of Neuilly-sur-Marne). The group featured the reigning German Champions, ESC Planegg of the Deutsche Fraueneishockey-Liga (DEBL); French Champions, HC Neuilly-sur-Marne of the Championnat de France Féminin Élite (FFHG Féminin Élite); English Champions, the Bracknell Queen Bees of the Women's National Ice Hockey League Elite (WNIHL Elite), and Spanish Champions, SAD Majadahonda of the Liga Nacional de Hockey Hielo Femenino.

ESC Planegg won the round handily and progressed to the second round. American forward Brooke Reimer (née Ammerman) of ESC Planegg was the group’s leading scorer, with 14 points (7 goals + 7 assists), and her teammate, German goaltender Nadja Gruber, was the top goaltender, posting an 88.89 save percentage and 1.00 goals against average.

==== Standings ====
Pos	Team	Pld	W	L	GF	GA	GD	Pts
1	(Germany) ESC Planegg	3	3	0	37	2	+35	9
2	(France) HC Neuilly-sur-Marne	3	2	1	21	7	+14	6
3	(United Kingdom) Bracknell Queen Bees	3	1	2	7	21	−14	3
4	(Spain) SAD Majadahonda	3	0	3	2	37	−35	0

Source: IIHF

==== Top scorers ====
Listed by highest total points (goals + assists), then most goals scored.

1. Brooke Ammerman Reimer (USA), ESC Planegg, 14 points (7+7)
2. Julia Zorn (GER), ESC Planegg, 13 points (7+6)
  Jillian Dempsey (USA), HC Neuilly-sur-Marne, 13 points (7+6)
4. Kerstin Spielberger (GER), ESC Planegg, 9 points (6+3)
5. Kelsey Ketcher (USA), ESC Planegg, 8 points (4+4)

Source(s): Hockey Archives

==== Top Goaltenders ====
Listed by highest save percentage (SVS%), then lowest goals against average (GAA). Goaltenders with less than 40% of their team’s total minutes not included.

1. Nadja Gruber (GER), ESC Planegg, 88.89 SVS%, 1.00 GAA
2. Manon Sellem (FRA), HC Neuilly-sur-Marne, 86.27 SVS%, 3.39 GAA
3. Bethany Gemson (GBR), Bracknell Queen Bees, 85.40 SVS%, 6.95 GAA
4. Ester Garcia Leon (SPA), SAD Majadahonda, 82.24 SVS%, 9.40 GAA

Source(s): IIHF

=== Group B ===
Group B was hosted in Liepāja, Latvia, and all games were played at the Liepājas Olimpiskā Centra (LOC; “Liepāja Olympic Center“). The group featured reigning Kazakh Champions, Aisulu Almaty; Latvian Champions, SHK Laima Rīga of the Latvian Women's Ice Hockey League; Romanian Champions, HSC Csíkszereda; and Belarusian Champions, HK Pantera Minsk.

SHK Laima Rīga was a goal producing powerhouse in the tournament, posting the highest goal differential of the sixteen teams in round one, at plus 40. Laima boasted the top three scorers of Group B, Inese Geca-Miljone (20 points), Lelde Hartmane (16 points), and Agnese Apsīte (12 points), who between them scored 25 goals across three games, and an excellent performance by goaltender Evija Tētiņa, who allowed just three goals across three games.

Ultimately, SHK Laima was defeated by Aisulu Almaty, on the backs of their stellar goaltending tandem, Tatyana Mozhayeva and Canadian Jillian Marie MacIsaac, who together shutout every opponent and finished the round with perfect 1.00 save percentages and 0.00 goals against average.

==== Standings ====
Pos	Team	Pld	W	L	GF	GA	GD	Pts
1	(Kazakhstan) Aisulu Almaty	3	3	0	29	0	+29	9
2	(Latvia) SHK Laima Rīga	3	2	1	43	3	+40	6
3	(Romania) HSC Csíkszereda	3	1	2	13	31	−18	3
4	(Belarus) HK Pantera Minsk	3	0	3	5	56	−51	0

Source: IIHF

==== Top scorers ====
Listed by highest total points (goals + assists), then most goals scored.

1. Inese Geca-Miljone (LAT), SHK Laima Rīga, 20 points (12+8)
2. Lelde Hartmane (LAT), SHK Laima Rīga, 16 points (7+9)
3. Agnese Apsīte (LAT), SHK Laima Rīga, 12 points (6+6)
4. Kirsten Marie Mihalcheon (CAN), Aisulu Almaty, 9 points (5+4)
5. Christina Marie Sharun (CAN), Aisulu Almaty, 9 points (4+5)

Source(s): Hockey Archives

==== Top Goaltenders ====
Listed by highest save percentage (SVS%), then lowest goals against average (GAA). Goaltenders with less than 40% of their team’s total minutes not included.

1. Jillian Marie MacIsaac (CAN), Aisulu Almaty, 100.00 SVS%, 0.00 GAA
2. Evija Tētiņa (LAT), SHK Laima Rīga, 94.55 SVS%, 1.00 GAA
3. Anett-Andrea Kurko (ROM), HSC Csíkszereda, 78.91 SVS%, 10.33 GAA
4. Nina Vabishchevich (BLR), HK Pantera Minsk, 65.35 SVS%, 17.50 GAA

Source(s): IIHF

=== Group C ===
Group C was hosted in Spišská Nová Ves, Slovakia, and all games were played at the Spiš Aréna. The group featured reigning Danish Champions Hvidovre IK, Slovak Champions HC Spišská Nová Ves of the 1. liga žien, Czech Champions SK Karviná of the 1. liga ženského hockey, and Polish Champions TMH Polonia Bytom of the Polska Liga Hokeja Kobiet (PLHK).

With no double-digit point scorers, middling goaltending, and a goal differential span from best to worst of just 21, the teams of Group C arguably had the greatest parity of any group in Round 1. Hvidovre IK won the round and progressed to the second, despite being marginally out scored by both HC Spišská Nová Ves and SK Karviná. Hvidovre’s Amalie Joa, posted the best goaltender statistics of the round, a passable 89.23 save percentage and 2.33 goals against average. Slovak Olympian Martina Veličková of HC Spišská Nová Ves was the group’s top scorer, with 8 points (5 goals + 3 assists).

==== Standings ====
Pos	Team	Pld	W	L	GF	GA	GD	Pts
1	(Denmark) Hvidovre IK	3	3	0	12	7	+5	9
2	(Slovakia) HK Spišská Nová Ves	3	2	1	15	8	+7	6
3	(Czech Republic) SK Karviná	3	1	2	14	10	+4	3
4	(Poland) TMH Polonia Bytom	3	0	3	5	21	−16	0

Source: IIHF

==== Top scorers ====
Listed by highest total points (goals + assists), then most goals scored.

1. Martina Veličková (SVK), HK Spišská Nová Ves, 8 points (5+3)
2. Vendula Přibylová (CZE), SK Karviná, 6 points (5+1)
3. Petra Pravlíková (SVK), HK Spišská Nová Ves, 6 points (1+5)
4. Karolina Późniewska (POL), TMH Polonia Bytom, 5 points (3+2)
5. Josefine Persson (DEN), Hvidovre IK, 5 points (2+3)
  Petra Jurčová (SVK), HK Spišská Nová Ves, 5 points (2+3)

Source(s): Hockey Archives

==== Top Goaltenders ====
Listed by highest save percentage (SVS%), then lowest goals against average (GAA). Goaltenders with less than 40% of their team’s total minutes not included.

1. Amalie Joa (DEN), Hvidovre IK, 89.23 SVS%, 2.33 GAA
2. Daniela Zuziakova (SVK), HK Spišská Nová Ves, 87.50 SVS%, 3.40 GAA
3. Klára Peslarová (CZE), SK Karviná, 86.79 SVS%, 3.53 GAA
4. Karolina Siemicka (POL), TMH Polonia Bytom, 81.82 SVS%, 7.45 GAA

Source(s): IIHF

=== Group D ===
Group D was hosted in Maribor, Slovenia, and all games were held at the Ledna Dvorana Tabor (“Tabor Ice Rink”). The group featured the reigning Austrian Champions, EHV Sabres Vienna of the Dameneishockey-Bundesliga (DEBL); Italian Champions, the EV Bozen Eagles of the Italian Hockey League Women (IHLW); Hungarian Champions, Vasas SC Budapest; and Slovenian Champions, HDK Maribor.

The EHV Sabres Vienna won the round and progressed to Group F of Round 2. Austrian forward Anna Meixner of the Sabres was the leading point scorer, with 12 points (7 goals + 5 assists). Three of Meixner’s teammates also slotted into positions as top five point-earners of the round: Canadian defender Regan Boulton, with 11 points (3 goals + 8 assists); American defender Kiira Dosdall, with 9 points (5 goals + 4 assists); and fellow Austrian forward Esther Väärälä (née Kantor), with 7 points (2 goals + 5 assists). Not to be outshone by the skaters, Sabres’ goaltender Victoria Vigilanti topped the goaltending statistics table, posting an excellent 93.10 save percentage and 0.82 goals against average.

==== Standings ====
Pos	Team	Pld	W	OTW	OTL	L	GF	GA	GD	Pts
1	(Austria) EHV Sabres Vienna	3	3	0	0	0	25	3	+22	9
2	(Italy) EV Bozen Eagles	3	1	1	0	1	18	8	+10	5
3	(Hungary) Vasas SC Budapest	3	1	0	1	1	4	18	−14	4
4	(Slovenia) HDK Maribor	3	0	0	0	3	1	19	−18	0

Source: IIHF

==== Top scorers ====
Listed by highest total points (goals + assists), then most goals scored.

1. Anna Meixner (AUT), EHV Sabres Vienna, 12 points (7+5)
2. Regan Boulton (CAN), EHV Sabres Vienna, 11 points (3+8)
3. Kiira Dosdall (USA), EHV Sabres Vienna, 9 points (5+4)
4. Eleonora Dalprà (ITA), EV Bozen Eagles, 7 points (4+3)
5. Esther Kantor Väärälä (AUT), EHV Sabres Vienna, 7 points (2+5)
  Chelsea Furlani (ITA/USA), EV Bozen Eagles, 5 points (2+5)

Source(s): Hockey Archives

==== Top Goaltenders ====
Listed by highest save percentage (SVS%), then lowest goals against average (GAA). Goaltenders with less than 40% of their team’s total minutes not included.

1. Victoria Vigilanti (CAN), EHV Sabres Wien, 93.10 SVS%, 0.82 GAA
2. Ines Confidenti (SLO), HDK Maribor, 88.29 SVS%, 5.74 GAA
3. Anikó Németh (HUN), Vasas Budapest, 87.50 SVS%, 5.94 GAA
4. Renata Poltzer (HUN), Vasas Budapest, 85.71 SVS%, 5.79 GAA
5. Daniela Klotz (ITA), EV Bozen Eagles, 81.58 SVS%, 2.94 GAA

Source(s): IIHF

== Round 2 ==
The second round was played during 6–8 December 2013 in two groups in two host cities. The national champion teams from the countries represented in the final of the 2012–13 IIHF European Women's Champions Cup received a bye for the first round and entered the tournament in the second round. Each group included two group winners from Round 1 and two national champions from the leagues represented in the previous year’s final. The teams finishing in the top two positions of each group moved on to the final.

=== Group E ===
Group E was hosted in Bad Tölz, Germany, and all games were played at Hacker Pischorr Arena (since renamed weeArena). The group introduced the reigning Swiss Champions, ZSC Lions Zurich of the Swiss Women's Hockey League A (SWHL A), and the reigning Russian and 2012–13 EWCC Champions, Tornado Moscow Region (HC Tornado) of the Women's Hockey League (ZhHL). The teams joined the Round 1 winners of Group A, ESC Planegg, and Group C, Hvidovre IK.

With the four best point scorers and the top goaltender of the group, Tornado Moscow Region easily dominated the round. Russian forward Iya Gavrilova of Tornado earned 13 points (6 goals + 7 assists) across the three games, averaging a blazing 4.33 points per game and soundly claiming position as top scorer. Slovak goaltender Zuzana Tomčíková, the Best Goaltender Selected by the Directorate in the 2013–14 EWCC final round, continued her high calibre of play, achieving a 94.58 save percentage and 1.09 goal against average.

The second place team, ESC Planegg, also progressed to the final round. American Brooke Ammerman Reimer was again the top point-getter for ESC Planegg, with 5 goals and 1 assist (6 points), and ranked fifth on the list of top scorers of the group. Planegg’s net-minder, Julia Graunke, also had a solid performance, with a 93.88 save percentage and 1.99 goals against average, placing second on the list of the group’s top goaltenders.

Hvidovre IK goaltender Amalie Joa faced a higher number of shots on goal than any other netminder of Group E, recording 132 saves across three games.

==== Standings ====
Pos	Team	Pld	W	L	GF	GA	GD	Pts
1	(Russia) Tornado Moscow Region	3	3	0	27	3	+24	9
2	(Germany) ESC Planegg	3	2	1	12	19	−7	6
3	(Switzerland) ZSC Lions Zurich	3	1	2	6	14	−8	3
4	(Denmark) Hvidovre IK	3	0	3	6	24	−18	0

Source: IIHF

==== Top scorers ====
Listed by highest total points (goals + assists), then most goals scored.

1. Iya Gavrilova (RUS), Tornado Moscow Region, 13 points (6+7)
2. Yekaterina Smolentseva (RUS), Tornado Moscow Region, 9 points (3+6)
3. Galina Skiba (RUS), Tornado Moscow Region, 8 points (5+3)
4. Olga Permyakova (RUS), Tornado Moscow Region, 7 points (2+5)
5. Brooke Ammerman Reimer (USA), ESC Planegg, 6 points (5+1)

Source(s): IIHF

==== Top Goaltenders ====
Listed by highest save percentage (SVS%), then lowest goals against average (GAA). Goaltenders with less than 40% of their team’s total minutes excluded.

1. Zuzana Tomčíková (SVK), Tornado Moscow Region, 94.58 SVS%, 1.09 GAA
2. Julia Graunke (GER), ESC Planegg, 93.88 SVS%, 1.99 GAA
3. Kaitlyn Greenway (CAN), ZSC Lions Zurich, 85.07 SVS%, 3.93 GAA
4. Amalie Joa (DAN), Hvidovre IK, 84.62 SVS%, 8.00 GAA
5. Lena Schuster (GER), ESC Planegg, 84.09 SVS%, 4.69 GAA

Source(s): IIHF

=== Group F ===
Group E was hosted in Lohja, Finland, and all games were played at Kisakallion Urheiluopiston jäähalli (Kisakallio Sports Academy Ice Rink; called “Kisakallio Arena” in IIHF documents). The group featured Round 1 winners Aisulu Almaty of Group B and the EHV Sabres Vienna of Group D, and introduced the reigning Finnish Champions, the Espoo Blues of the Naisten SM-sarja, and the reigning Swedish Champions, AIK Hockey of the Riksserien.

AIK Hockey won the group, helped in no small part by the 92.68 save percentage posted by goaltender Minatsu Murase, the second best of the group, and depth scoring.

The Espoo Blues placed second and claimed the top four point scorers of the group: forwards Linda Välimäki, with 8 points (2 goals + 6 assists), Emma Nuutinen, with 7 points (4 goals + 3 assists), and Annina Rajahuhta, with 7 points (1 goal + 6 assists), and defender Emma Terho, with 5 points (3 goals + 2 assists). The Blues were plagued by poor net-minding and, despite out-scoring the three other teams, ended the round with a goal differential of just +1.

Victoria Vigilanti was excellent in net for the EHV Sabres, earning the best save percentage of the round, a 92.77, and 2.00 goals against average. Minatsu Murase of AIK Hockey concluded the round with a save percentage less than a tenth of a percentage point behind Vigilanti and a 1.50 goals against average, out performing the Sabres’ goalie by 0.50 GAA.

The Group F “Best Players Selected by the Directorate” included players from three teams and diverged slightly from the tradition of simply selecting the players at the top of the scoring and goaltending charts. Canadian goaltender Jillian Marie MacIsaac of Aisulu Almaty was named “Best Goalkeeper” of the group. MacIsaac played every minute of Aisulu’s three matches and made 84 saves on 93 shots on goal, the most shots faced and saves made by any goalie in the group. Swedish defenceman Linnea Hedin of AIK Hockey was named “Best Defenseman.” Sixteen year old Finnish forward Emma Nuutinen was named “Best Forward,” having scored the most goals and the second-most points of any player in the group.

==== Standings ====
Pos	Team	Pld	W	L	GF	GA	GD	Pts
1	(Sweden) AIK Hockey	3	3	0	10	3	+7	9
2	(Finland) Espoo Blues	3	2	1	12	11	+1	6
3	(Austria) EHV Sabres Vienna	3	1	2	6	7	−1	3
4	(Kazakhstan) Aisulu Almaty	3	0	3	2	9	−7	0

Source: IIHF

==== Top scorers ====
Listed by highest total points (goals + assists), then most goals scored.

1. Linda Välimäki (FIN), Espoo Blues, 8 points (2+6)
2. Emma Nuutinen (FIN), Espoo Blues, 7 points (4+3)
3. Annina Rajahuhta (FIN), Espoo Blues, 7 points (1+6)
4. Emma Terho (FIN), Espoo Blues, 5 points (3+2)
5. Anna Meixner (AUT), EHV Sabres Vienna, 5 points (3+0)

Source(s): IIHF

==== Top Goaltenders ====
Listed by highest save percentage (SVS%), then lowest goals against average (GAA). Goaltenders with less than 40% of their team’s total minutes not included.

1. Victoria Vigilanti (CAN), EHV Sabres Vienna, 92.77 SVS%, 2.00 GAA
2. Minatsu Murase (SWE), AIK Hockey, 92.68 SVS%, 1.50 GAA
3. Jillian Marie MacIsaac (CAN), Aisulu Almaty, 90.32 SVS%, 3.01 GAA
4. Mari Koivisto (FIN), Espoo Blues, 84.48 SVS%, 3.09 GAA

Source(s): IIHF

==== Best Players Selected by the Directorate ====
- Best Goaltender: Jillian Marie MacIsaac (CAN), (Kazakhstan) Aisulu Almaty
- Best Defenseman: Linnea Hedin (SWE), (Sweden) AIK Hockey
- Best Forward: Emma Nuutinen (FIN), (Finland) Espoo Blues

Source(s): IIHF

== Finals ==
The final round was hosted in Bad Tölz, Germany, and all games were played at the Hacker-Pschorr Arena (since renamed weeArena). The round featured a significant number of recent Olympians, as each team was from a country represented, several weeks prior, in the women's ice hockey tournament at the 2014 Winter Olympics, though none of the nations represented ultimately medaled. In total, 22 players from the 2014 Sochi Olympics played in the 2013–14 European Women's Champions Cup Final; three players from the Swedish national team, four players from the German national team, five players from the Finnish national team, and nine players – nearly half of the roster – from the disqualified Russian national team.

Tornado Moscow Region was once again a force to be reckoned with, topping both the scoring and goaltending charts. The three leading scorers of the final were HK Tornado forwards: Kelley Steadman, 6 points (5 goals + 1 assist), Iya Gavrilova, 6 points (4 goals + 2 assists), and Anna Shokhina, 5 points (2 goals + 3 assists). HK Tornado goaltender Zuzana Tomčíková turned in an even better performance than the 94.74 save percentage and 1.33 goals against she posted in the 2012–13 EWCC Finals, achieving a brilliant 96.55 save percentage and 1.00 goals against average.

The “Best Players Selected by the Directorate” awards went to two Tornado Moscow Region players and one player from fourth-place ESC Planegg. American forward Kelley Steadman of HK Tornado, the top scorer of the Finals, was named “Best Forward” by the directorate. In a repeat of the 2012–13 EWCC Finals, Slovak goaltender Zuzana Tomčíková was named “Best Goalkeeper.” With the selection, Tomčíková became the second goalie and third player in EWCC Finals history to be selected by the directorate in multiple years (the other goaltender selected was Kim Martin Hasson of AIK Hockey, in 2005 and 2006, and the other player was defenceman Emma Terho of the Espoo Blues, in 2006 and 2010). Swiss defender Kathrin Lehmann of ESC Planegg was named “Best Defenseman,” the only player from a German team to ever be selected for the award in the EWCC Finals.

=== Standings ===
Pos	Team	Pld	W	OTW	OTL	L	GF	GA	GD	Pts
1	(Russia) Tornado Moscow Region	3	3	0	0	0	13	2	+11	9
2	(Sweden) AIK Hockey	3	1	0	1	1	7	11	−4	4
3	(Finland) Espoo Blues	3	1	0	0	2	5	7	−2	3
4	(Germany) ESC Planegg	3	0	1	0	2	5	10	−5	2

Source: IIHF

=== Results ===
Abbreviation key: EA = extra attacker, ENG = empty net goal, PP1 = power play, PP2 = power play two-man advantage, PS = penalty shot, SH = short-handed, Teams: AIK = AIK Hockey, BLU = Espoo Blues, PLA = ESC Planegg, TOR = Tornado Moscow Region.

14 March 2014; 11:40	Espoo Blues (Finland)	3–1 (2–1, 1–0, 0–0)	(Germany) ESC Planegg	Hacker Pschorr Arena; Attendance: 100

Game reference

Isabella Portnoj
Goalies
Lena Schuster
Referee:
Zuzana Findurova (SVK)
Linesmen:
Maria Raabye Fuchsel (DEN)
Senovwa Mollen (NED)

Tulus (Nuutinen, Posa) (PP1) – 6:48	1–0
	1–1	10:22 – Rothemund (Spielberger)
Tulus (PS) – 15:27	2–1
Nuutinen (Tulus) – 33:25	3–1

8 min
Penalties
8 min
32
Shots
14

Players of the Game: Noora Tulus (BLU), Lena Schuster (PLA)

14 March 2014; 15:00	Tornado Moscow Region (Russia)	6–1 (3–0, 3–1, 0–0)	(Sweden) AIK Hockey	Hacker Pschorr Arena; Attendance: 150

Game reference

Zuzana Tomčíková
Goalies
Minatsu Murase (00:00–10:08)
Lovisa Berndtsson (10:08–60:00)
Referee:
Marie Picavet (FRA)
Linesmen:
Anne-Sophie Boniface (FRA)
Lisa Huffner (GER)

Gavrilova (Permyakova) – 00:34	1–0
Gavrilova (Polunina, Permyakova) – 8:28	2–0
Smolentseva (Shokhina) – 10:08	3–0
Shokhina (PP2) – 23:36	4–0
Shokhina (Trachyova) (PP1) – 27:24	5–0
Steadman – 33:20	6–0
	6–1	38:17 – Alasalmi (Yucel, Johansson)

16 min
Penalties
16 min
28
Shots
22

Players of the Game: Iya Gavrilova (TOR), Lisa Johansson (AIK)

15 March 2014; 13:35	Tornado Moscow Region (Russia)	3–1; 0–0 / 0–0 / 3–1	(Finland) Espoo Blues	Hacker Pschorr Arena; Attendance: 150

Game reference

Zuzana Tomčíková
Goalies
Isabella Portnoj
Referee:
Zuzana Findurova (SVK)
Linesmen:
Lisa Huffner (GER)
Natalie Mauelshagen (GER)

Gavrilova (Burina, Steadman) – 44:58	1–0
Steadman (Nikolayeva) – 45:46	2–0
	2–1	57:48 – C. Posa (Huhta, Ratinen) (EA)
Steadman (Permyakova) (ENG) – 59:45	3–1

6 min
Penalties
8 min
27
Shots
36

Players of the Game: Zuzana Tomčíková (TOR), Isabella Portnoj (BLU)

15 March 2014; 16:50	ESC Planegg (Germany)	4–3 (0–1, 2–0, 1–2, 0–0, 1–0)	(Sweden) AIK Hockey	Hacker Pschorr Arena; Attendance: 300

Game reference

Julia Graunke
Goalies
Lovisa Berndtsson
Referee:
Kendall Hanley (USA)
Linesmen:
Anne-Sophie Boniface (FRA)
Maria Raabye Fuchsel (DEN)

	0–1	16:51 – Bäckman (Ahlgren Bloom, Löwenhielm) (PP1)
Pink (Ammerman, Lehmann) (PP1) – 23:52	1–1
Ammerman (Kratzer) (PP1) – 35:53	2–1
	2–2	49:23 – Alasalmi (Löwenhielm, Yucel)
Evers (Ammerman) – 59:01	3–2
	3–3	59:34 – Martinsen (SH, EA)

Shootout

Shoot out goal scored by Monika Pink (PLA)
18 min
Penalties
20 min
16
Shots
25

Players of the Game: Brooke Ammerman Reimer (PLA), Linnéa Bäckman (AIK)

16 March 2014; 11:15	AIK Hockey (Sweden)	3–1 (0–0, 0–1, 3–0)	(Finland) Espoo Blues	Hacker Pschorr Arena; Attendance: 150

Game reference

Minatsu Murase
Goalies
Isabella Portnoj
Referee:
Kendall Hanley (USA)
Linesmen:
Maria Raabye Fuchsel (DEN)
Natalie Mauelshagen (GER)

	0–1	39:59 – Rajahuhta (Tuominen, Hallvar)
Johansson (Löwenhielm) – 53:10	1–1
Löwenhielm (Ahlgren Bloom, Martinsen) (PP1, EA) – 57:22	2–1
Martinsen (ENG) – 59:12	3–1

18 min
Penalties
16 min
23
Shots
23

Players of the Game: Linnea Hedin (AIK), Emma Terho (BLU)

16 March 2014; 14:45	ESC Planegg (Germany)	0–4 (0–1, 0–2, 0–1)	(Russia) Tornado Moscow Region	Hacker Pschorr Arena; Attendance: 250

Game reference

Lena Schuster
Goalies
Anna Prugova
Referee:
Marie Picavet (FRA)
Linesmen:
Anne-Sophie Boniface (FRA)
Senovwa Mollen (NED)

0–1	19:55 – Steadman (Permyakova, Gavrilova) (PP1)
0–2	27:57 – Steadman (Shokhina, Gavrilova)
0–3	36:39 – Gavrilova (Shokhina)
0–4	57:00 – Shukina (Sergina)

20 min
Penalties
16 min
24
Shots
29

Players of the Game: Kathrin Lehman (PLA), Kelley Steadman (TOR)

Source(s): IIHF

=== Top Scorers of the Finals ===
Listed by highest total points (goals + assists), then most goals scored.

1. Kelley Steadman (USA), Tornado Moscow Region, 6 points (5+1)
2. Iya Gavrilova (RUS), Tornado Moscow Region, 6 points (4+2)
3. Anna Shokhina (RUS), Tornado Moscow Region, 5 points (2+3)
4. Michelle Löwenhielm (SWE), AIK Hockey, 4 points (1+3)
5. Olga Permyakova (RUS), Tornado Moscow Region, 4 points (0+4)
6. Helene Martinsen (NOR), AIK Hockey, 3 points (2+1)
  Noora Tulus (FIN), Espoo Blues, 3 points (2+1)
8. Brooke Ammerman Reimer (USA), ESC Planegg, 3 points (1+2)
9. Emmy Alasalmi (SWE), AIK Hockey, 2 points (2+0)
  Monika Pink (GER), ESC Planegg, 2 points (2+0)

=== Top Goaltenders of the Finals ===
Listed by highest save percentage (SVS%), then lowest goals against average (GAA). Goaltenders with less than 40% of their team’s total minutes not included.

1. Zuzana Tomčíková (SVK), Tornado Moscow Region, 96.55 SVS%, 1.00 GAA
2. Isabella Portnoj (FIN), Espoo Blues, 91.94 SVS%, 1.70 GAA
3. Lena Schuster (GER), ESC Planegg, 88.52 SVS%, 3.50 GAA
4. Lovisa Berndtsson (SWE), AIK Hockey, 80.56 SVS%, 3.66 GAA

Source(s): IIHF

=== Best Players Selected by the Directorate ===
Award	Name	Team	No.
Best Goalkeeper	Zuzana Tomčíková (SVK)	(Russia) Tornado Moscow Region	35
Best Defenseman	Kathrin Lehmann (SUI)	(Germany) ESC Planegg	19
Best Forward	Kelley Steadman (USA)	(Russia) Tornado Moscow Region	18

Source(s): IIHF

=== Champions roster ===
(Russia) Tornado Moscow Region	Goalies: Anna Prugova, Zuzana Tomčíková Defense: Yekaterina Nikolayeva, Olga Permyakova, Nina Pirogova, Zoya Polunina, Anna Shukina, Brittany Simpson, Svetlana Tkacheva Forwards: Xenia Bocharova, Tatyana Burina, Iya Gavrilova, Svetlana Kolmykova, Marina Sergina, Anna Shokhina, Galina Skiba, Yekaterina Smolina, Yekaterina Smolentseva, Kelley Steadman Head Coach: Alexei Chistyakov

Source(s): IIHF
