= Lyudmila Yurlova =

Russian ice hockey and bandy player

- Born: 1 April 1972 Velsk, Russian SFSR, Soviet Union
- Died: 28 November 2016 (aged 44) Khimki, Russia
- Height: 171 cm (5 ft 7 in)
- Weight: 72 kg (159 lb; 11 st 5 lb)
- Position: Forward
- Shot: Left
- Played for: SKIF Moscow
- National team: Russia
- Playing career: 1993–c. 2008
Medal record
Women's ice hockey
World Championship
Bronze medal – third place	2001 United States
European Championship
Silver medal – second place	1996 Russia

Lyudmila Petrovna "Liuda" Yurlova MS (Russian: Людмила Петровна Юрлова; 1 April 1972 – 28 November 2016) was a Russian ice hockey forward and bandy player. As a member of the Russian national ice hockey team, she won a silver medal at the 1996 European Championship and a bronze medal at the 2001 World Championship. She was a Master of Sport of Russia of International Class in both bandy and ice hockey.

== Playing career ==
Yurlova was born on 1 April 1972 in Velsk, a town near the central-southern border of Arkhangelsk Oblast in the Russian Soviet Federative Socialist Republic (Russian SFSR) of the Soviet Union. She began playing bandy as a child and, while attending Syktyvkar School No. 21 for secondary school in Syktyvkar, Komi Republic, she played with the bandy club Stroitel Syktyvkar. As a captain of Stroitel, she won first place in the Soviet All-Union Bandy Cup. She also participated in the Spartakiad of the Peoples of the Russian SFSR.

After graduating, she entered the department of Physical Education at the Arkhangelsk State Pedagogical Institute (now part of the Northern (Arctic) Federal University) in Arkhangelsk, home of Burevestnik (Russian: Буревестник), one of the best women's bandy teams in the country. Yurlova joined Burevestnik and became a Russian Championship silver medalist with the team. She later played with Octyabr (Russian: Октябрь, lit. 'October') in Moscow and won the Russian Championship title in women's bandy.

In 1993, at age 21, she switched from bandy to ice hockey. Yurlova began playing in the newly-created Russian Women's Hockey League (RWHL) with Luzhniki Moscow in 1995 and was a member of the historic Luzhniki roster that won the inaugural Russian Championship title in women's ice hockey in 1996. She remained with the club – which was later known as CSK VVS Moscow (1996–1998), Viking Moscow (1998–2000), SKIF Moscow (2000–2006), and SKIF Nizhny Novgorod (2006–present) – until her retirement from ice hockey in 2008. going on to win another seven Russian Championship titles with the team, in addition to two IIHF European Women's Champions Cup medals, silver in 2004 and bronze in 2005.

=== International play ===
Yurlova made her debut with the Russian national ice hockey team at the 1996 IIHF European Women Championship, where she contributed to Russia’s silver medal victory – the first and only European Championship medal won by the nation. She also participated in the IIHF Women's World Championships in 1997, 1999, 2000, and 2001, winning bronze at the 2001 tournament – Russia’s first World Championship medal, which stood as the team’s only medal for fifteen years until they claimed bronze again at the 2016 tournament.

== Death ==
Yurlova, her husband, and her four-year-old son died in their sleep as the result of accidental carbon monoxide poisoning on 28 November 2016 at the family’s home in Khimki, Moscow Oblast. The source was identified as the automatic washing machine in their bathroom, which ignited while operating during the night. Though the fire did not spread to the rest of the house, the smoke it released caused the family to asphyxiate.

In a game against Arktik-Universitet Ukhta on 29 November 2016, the players of SKIF Nizhny Novgorod took to the ice with black armbands and the match began with a minute of silence in memory of Yurlova. Former teammate Tatiana Burina remembered her as a "kind, cheerful, and outgoing person" who was "strict" when it came to ice hockey but was always willing to help and offer suggestions. Yekaterina Smolentseva described Yurlova as "like a mother" to her and recalled how Yurlova took Smolentseva under her wing when the decade-younger player joined the national team at age 14.
