= 2005 IIHF European Women's Champions Cup =

International ice hockey club tournament

Tournament details
- Host countries: Sweden; Estonia; Germany; Italy
- Venue(s): 4 (in 4 host cities)
- Dates: Qualifiers; 13–16 October 2005; Finals; 2–4 December 2005
- Teams: 13

Final positions
- Champions: (Sweden) AIK IF (2nd title)
- Runner-up: (Finland) Espoo Blues
- Third place: (Russia) SKIF Moscow
- Fourth place: (Switzerland) EV Zug

Tournament statistics
- Scoring leader(s): Finals; Karoliina Rantamäki, Espoo Blues (5 points)

The 2005 IIHF European Women's Champions Cup was the second holding of the IIHF European Women's Champions Cup (EWCC) ice hockey club tournament. AIK IF Solna of Sweden's Riksserien won the tournament for the second consecutive time.

Each of the Qualification groups and the Super Final were played as single round-robin tournaments. Points were awarded by match outcome: two points for a regulation win, one point for an overtime win or loss, and no points/zero points for a regulation loss. As the defending cup holders, AIK IF progressed directly to the Super Final and did not participate in the qualification round.

== Qualification ==
The qualification round was played in three groups in three host cities during 13–16 October 2005. The team with the highest point total in each round-robin group moved on to the Finals.

=== Group A ===
Group A was hosted in Tallinn, Estonia and played during 14–16 October 2005. The Espoo Blues Naiset of Finland's Naisten SM-sarja won the round and progressed to the Final.

Pos	Team	Pld	W	D	L	GF	GA	GD	Pts
1	(Finland) Espoo Blues	3	3	0	0	54	1	+53	6
2	(Kazakhstan) Aisulu Almaty	3	2	0	1	32	5	+27	4
3	(Latvia) SHK Laima Riga	3	1	0	2	13	13	0	2
4	(Estonia) Dreamland Queens Tallinn	3	0	0	3	1	81	−80	0

=== Group B ===
Group B was played during 13–15 October 2005 and hosted in Bolzano, Italy, though no Italian teams participated. SKIF Moscow of the Russian Women's Hockey League won the round and progressed to the Final.

Pos	Team	Pld	W	D	L	GF	GA	GD	Pts
1	(Russia) SKIF Moscow	3	3	0	0	26	2	+24	6
2	(Sweden) MB Hockey Skärholmen	3	2	0	1	23	6	+17	4
3	(Denmark) HC Rødovre	3	1	0	2	12	12	0	2
4	(Hungary) UTE Marilyn Budapest	3	0	0	3	1	42	−41	0

=== Group C ===
Group C was hosted in Unna, Germany, and played during 14–16 October 2005. EV Zug Damen of Switzerland's Leistungsklasse A won the round and progressed to the Final.

Pos	Team	Pld	W	D	L	GF	GA	GD	Pts
1	(Switzerland) EV Zug	3	3	0	0	28	4	+24	6
2	(France) HC Cergy-Pontoise	3	1	1	1	9	19	−10	3
3	(Germany) EC Bergkamen	3	1	0	2	7	10	−3	2
4	(Slovakia) MHK Martin	3	0	1	2	9	20	−11	1

== Super Final ==
The Super Final was hosted in Solna, Sweden, the same host city as the 2004–05 EWCC Final, and was played during 2–4 December 2005. AIK IF Solna of Sweden's Riksserien won the Cup for the second time. Karoliina Rantamäki of the Espoo Blues was the top scorer of the Super Final with five points (1+4).

Pos	Team	Pld	W	D	L	GF	GA	GD	Pts
1st place, gold medalist(s)	(Sweden) AIK	3	3	0	0	7	3	+4	**6**
2nd place, silver medalist(s)	(Finland) Espoo Blues	3	2	0	1	8	5	+3	**4**
3rd place, bronze medalist(s)	(Russia) SKIF Moscow	3	0	1	2	5	7	−2	**1**
4	(Switzerland) EV Zug	3	0	1	2	6	11	−5	**1**

=== Statistics ===
==== Top scorers ====
Abbreviations: GP = games played, G = goals, A = assists, Pts = points, +/- = plus–minus, PIM = penalty infraction minutes; Bold: Best of tournament

Player	Team	GP	G	A	Pts	+/−	PIM
Karoliina Rantamäki	(Finland) Espoo Blues	3	**4**	1	**5**	**+4**	2
Pernilla Winberg	(Sweden) AIK IF	3	2	2	4	+2	0
Danijela Rundqvist	(Sweden) AIK IF	3	1	**3**	4	+2	6
Julia Marty	(Switzerland) EV Zug	3	2	1	3	+1	0
Daniela Díaz	(Switzerland) EV Zug	3	2	1	3	−2	2
Marjo Voutilainen	(Finland) Espoo Blues	3	1	2	3	+1	2
Petra Vaarakallio	(Finland) Espoo Blues	3	1	2	3	+3	6
Isabella Jordansson	(Sweden) AIK IF	3	0	3	3	+2	0

==== Top goaltenders ====
Abbreviations: GP = games played, TOI = time on ice (in minutes), GA = goals against, SO = shutouts, SV% = save percentage, GAA = goals against average; Bold: Best of tournament

Player	Team	GP	TOI	GA	SO	SV%	GAA
Kim Martin	(Sweden) AIK IF	3	180:00	**3**	**1**	**97.52**	**1.00**
Noora Räty	(Finland) Espoo Blues	3	179:10	5	**1**	93.06	1.67
Michelle von Allmen	(Switzerland) EV Zug	3	179:45	8	0	91.30	2.67
Nadezhda Alexandrova	(Russia) SKIF Moscow	2	120:00	5	0	88.89	2.50

=== Best Players Selected by the Directorate ===
Award	No.	Player	Team
Best Goalkeeper	30	Kim Martin (SWE)	(Sweden) AIK IF
Best Defenceman	10	Emma Laaksonen (FIN)	(Finland) Espoo Blues
Best Forward	4	Daniela Díaz (SUI/SPA)	(Switzerland) EV Zug
