= Women's European Ice Hockey Championships =

There are several ice hockey championships for European women, including:

- IIHF European Women Championships
- IIHF European Women's Champions Cup
