= Emma Terho =

Finnish ice hockey executive

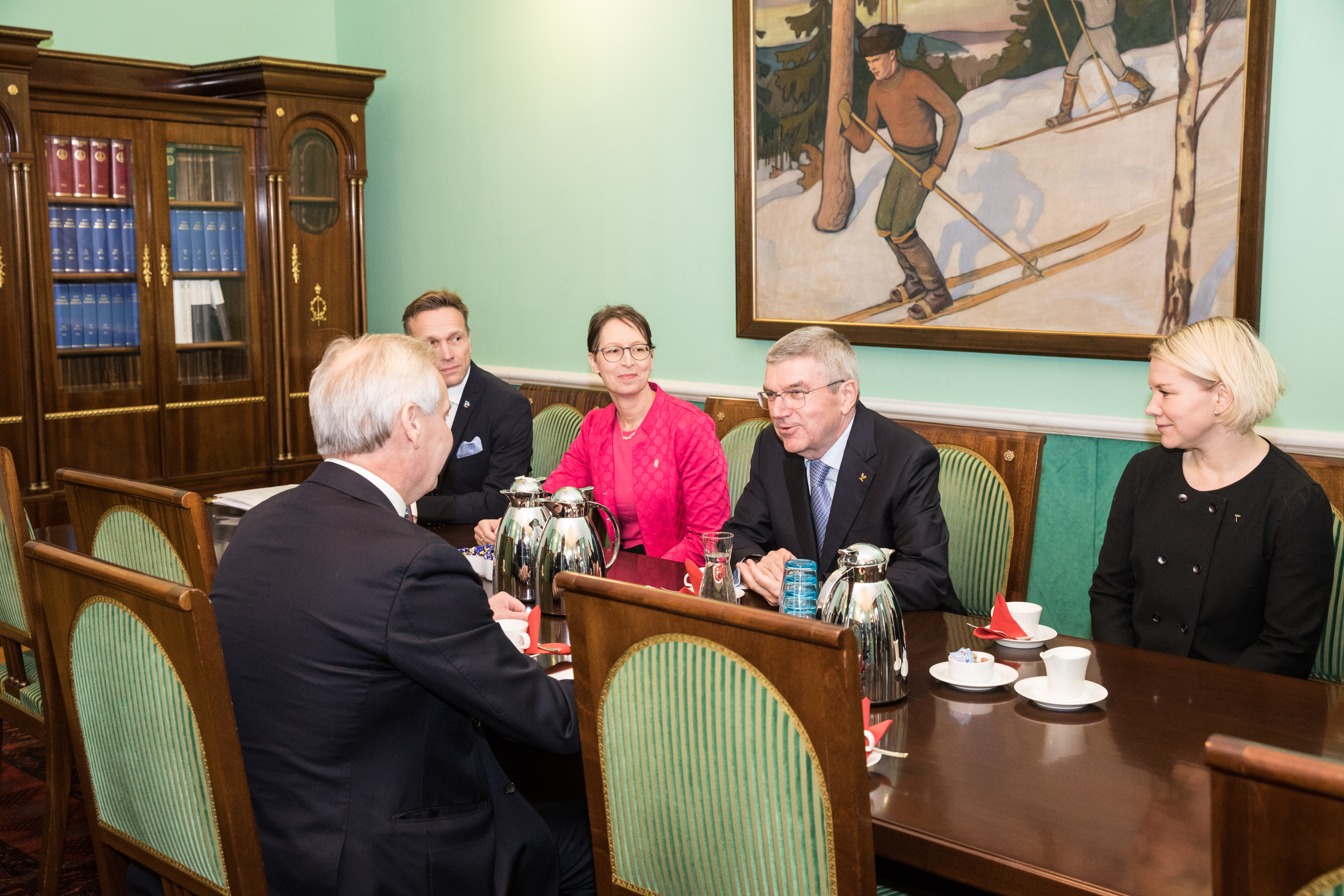
- Terho representing the IOC Athletes' Commission in 2019

Personal information
- Born: Emma Kristiina Laaksonen; 17 December 1981 (age 44) Washington, D.C., United States
- Home town: Espoo, Uusimaa, Finland
- Education: MSc in Economics, Aalto University 2013; BBA in Finance, Ohio State University 2004
- Occupation: Ice hockey executive
Ice hockey career
- Height: 159 cm (5 ft 3 in)
- Weight: 60 kg (132 lb; 9 st 6 lb)
- Position: Defense
- Played for: Ohio State Buckeyes; SKIF Nizhny Novgorod; Espoo Blues
- National team: Finland
- Playing career: 1997–2017
Medal record
Olympic Games
Bronze medal – third place	2010 Vancouver	Ice hockey
Bronze medal – third place	1998 Nagano	Ice hockey
World Championship
Bronze medal – third place	2009 Finland
Bronze medal – third place	2008 China
Bronze medal – third place	2004 Canada
Bronze medal – third place	2000 Canada

Emma Kristiina Laaksonen Terho (born 17 December 1981) is a Finnish ice hockey executive, retired defenceman and the current Chair of the IOC Athletes' Commission. She previously served as general manager of Kiekko-Espoo Naiset in the Naisten Liiga. At the 1998 Winter Olympics in Nagano she became the youngest Winter Olympian to medal for Finland, winning a bronze medal at the age of 16 years 54 days.

== Playing career ==
=== Ohio State University ===
Terho played college ice hockey with the Ohio State Buckeyes women's ice hockey program while attending Ohio State University (OSU) during 2000 to 2004. In the 2001–02 season she was the first women's ice hockey player from Ohio State to earn All-American honors when she was named to the 2001–02 Jofa/American Hockey Coaches Association (AHCA) Second Team All-American and was a top-10 finalist for the Patty Kazmaier Award.

On 11 October 2008, Terho became the first women's hockey player to have her Buckeye number retired. The retirement ceremony occurred prior to an Ohio State vs. Purdue University football game at Ohio Stadium, where Terho was recognized on the field at the 50-yard line. She was inducted into the Ohio State Athletics Hall of Fame on 25 September 2009.

=== Espoo Blues, 2004–2007 ===
In Finland she played with the Espoo Blues Naiset, with whom she won the Finnish Championship eight times (1999, 2000, 2005, 2007, 2009, 2013, 2014, and 2015). With the Espoo Blues she won three Finnish Championship bronze medals (1997, 1998, and 2006).

=== SKIF Nizhny Novgorod ===
In the 2007–08 season Terho played in Nizhny Novgorod, Russia with SKIF of the Russian Women's Hockey League (RWHL). Three other Finnish players, forwards Kati Kovalainen, Karoliina Rantamäki, and Nora Tallus, also played for SKIF in that season. The team won the 2008 Russian Women's Hockey League Championship.

=== Espoo, 2008–2017 ===
Terho returned to the Espoo Blues after the 2007–08 season in Russia. The 2008–09 season was very successful, both personally and for the team. Terho set a career high for assists with 32 and ended the regular season with an impressive 34 points in just 19 games.

== International play ==
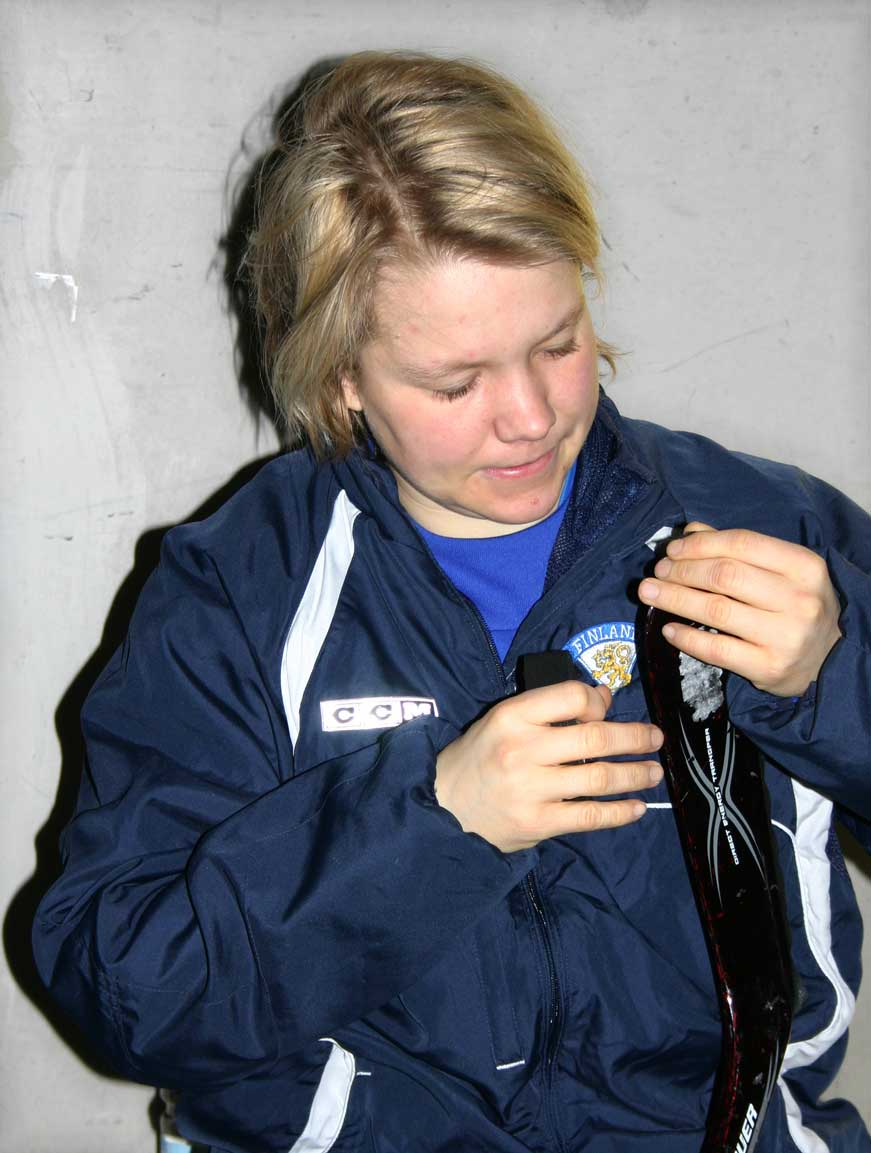
Terho with Naisleijonat in 2009

As a member of the Finnish national ice hockey team, Terho was a five-time Winter Olympian and two time Olympic bronze medalist. In the inaugural Olympic women's ice hockey tournament at the 1998 Olympics, she was the youngest player on the bronze medal-winning Finnish team, at 16 years and 54 days. She served as Finland's captain in the women's ice hockey tournament at the 2010 Winter Olympics in Vancouver, at which she won her second Olympic bronze medal, and as an alternate captain in the women's ice hockey tournament at the 2014 Winter Olympics in Sochi.

Terho also represented Finland at eight IIHF Women's World Championships, winning bronze medals at the tournaments in 2000, 2004, 2008, and 2009, in addition to participating at the tournaments in 2001, 2005, 2007, and 2013. She was selected to the Media All-Star team at the 2008 tournament.

== Sports administration ==
Terho became involved in the administrative aspect of sport as a member of the Student Athlete Board during her junior and senior years at Ohio State University (2002–2004). In 2006, after graduating and returning to Finland to play in the Naisten SM-sarja, she became a member of the Finnish Olympic Committee. In 2011 as part of the IIHF Ambassador and Mentor Program (AMP) she became an Athlete Ambassador to Kazakhstan with the directive to use her experience at Olympic Games, World Championships, and other high level women's ice hockey programs to help build the women's game in her designated country. As her playing career wound down, Terho ramped up her involvement in Finnish sports administration and became an influential and important player in that sphere.

At the 2018 Winter Olympics, Terho was elected for an eight-year term as a member of the IOC Athletes' Commission, with the largest share of votes of all candidates put forward. The election also made her an International Olympic Committee Member. On 6 August 2021, at the 2020 Summer Olympics in Tokyo, Terho was elected as the new Chair of the IOC Athletes' Commission. She replaced outgoing Chair Kirsty Coventry, who had served as chair since 2018 and had remained in role for an additional year beyond her eight-year term to help maintain the IOC Athletes’ Commission's work during the COVID-19 pandemic, following the postponement of the 2020 Olympic Games.

=== Administrative titles and roles ===
- Member of the Board, Finnish Ice Hockey Association, 2014–present
- Member of the Finnish Advisory Board of Sport Ethics, 2015–present
- Chair of Finnish Olympic Committee Athletes’ Commission, 2016–2020; member, 2006–2016
- Member of the International Ice Hockey Federation (IIHF) Women's Committee, 2016–present
- Member of the International Olympic Committee (IOC), 2018–present
  - Chair of the IOC Athletes' Commission, 2021–present; member, 2018–2021
  - Member of the Coordination Commission for the XXIV Olympic Winter Games (Beijing 2022), 2018–2022
  - Member of the Olympic Programme Commission, 2018–present
  - Member of the Marketing Commission, 2020–2021
  - Member of the Legal Affairs Commission, 2019–2021
  - Member of the Olympic Solidarity Commission, 2022–present
- Member of the World Anti-Doping Agency (WADA) Foundation Board, 2018–present
  - Member of the executive committee, 2021–present

== Personal life ==
Terho's mother is Vappu Viertola and her father is Jukka Laaksonen, a physicist and leading expert in the fields of nuclear energy and radiation safety; he served as Director General of the Finnish Radiation and Nuclear Safety Authority during 1997 to 2012. Terho was born on 17 December 1981 in Washington, D.C., where her father had been invited to survey and improve nuclear safety in the United States following the Three Mile Island accident in 1979.

Terho holds a Bachelor of Business Administration in Finance from Ohio State University (2004) and a Masters of Science in Economics from the Helsinki School of Economics at Aalto University (2013). She began her career in finance while still an active ice hockey player, serving as a fixed income trader for Pohjola Bank from 2006 to 2013. Beginning in 2014, Terho served as a product manager for fixed income products at OP-Pohjola Financial Group.

Her husband, Teemu Terho, also works in banking. They have two children, born in 2012 and 2014.

== Career statistics ==
=== Regular season and playoffs ===
			Regular season					Playoffs
Season	Team	League	GP	G	A	Pts	PIM	GP	G	A	Pts	PIM
1996–97	Kiekko-Espoo	Naisten SM-sarja	24	3	5	8	8	4	0	2	2	2
1997–98	Kiekko-Espoo	Naisten SM-sarja	23	3	3	6	4	4	0	0	0	4
1998–99	Espoo Blues	Naisten SM-sarja	23	2	6	8	8	6	1	0	1	4
1999–00	Espoo Blues	Naisten SM-sarja	25	7	7	14	4	6	1	3	4	4
2000–01	Ohio State Buckeyes	NCAA	34	19	18	37	10	—	—	—	—	—
2001–02	Ohio State Buckeyes	NCAA	25	6	15	21	10	—	—	—	—	—
2002–03	Ohio State Buckeyes	NCAA	31	6	15	21	14	—	—	—	—	—
2003–04	Ohio State Buckeyes	NCAA	35	3	16	19	12	—	—	—	—	—
2004–05	Espoo Blues	Naisten SM-sarja	19	6	11	17	8	5	0	2	2	0
2005–06	Espoo Blues	Naisten SM-sarja	22	4	10	14	16	5	3	1	4	4
2006–07	Espoo Blues	Naisten SM-sarja	17	3	11	14	10	7	0	6	6	2
2007–08	SKIF Nizhny Novgorod	RWHL
2008–09	Espoo Blues	Naisten SM-sarja	19	2	32	34	6	6	3	3	6	6
2009–10	Espoo Blues	Naisten SM-sarja	18	8	11	19	12	12	2	9	11	12
2010–11	Espoo Blues	Naisten SM-sarja	25	9	29	38	16	4	1	3	4	6
2011–12	Espoo Blues	Naisten SM-sarja	—	—	—	—	—	2	0	0	0	0
2012–13	Espoo Blues	Naisten SM-sarja	21	2	22	24	10	9	2	5	7	4
2013–14	Espoo Blues	Naisten SM-sarja	22	5	22	27	6	3	0	4	4	0
2014–15	Espoo Blues	Naisten SM-sarja	2	0	2	2	0	—	—	—	—	—
2015–16	Did not play		—					—
2016–17	Espoo United	Naisten SM-sarja	1	0	1	1	0	5	0	2	2	4
2018–19	Espoo Blues	Naisten Liiga	1	0	1	1	0	—	—	—	—	—
NCAA totals			125	34	64	98	46	—	–	–	–	–
Naisten SM-sarja totals			261	54	172	226	108	78	13	40	53	52

==== Club tournaments ====
Year	Team	Event	Rank	GP	G	A	Pts	PIM
2004	Espoo Blues	EWCC	4th	3	0	2	2	0
2005	Espoo Blues	EWCC	2nd place, silver medalist(s)	3	1	1	2	2
2009	Espoo Blues	EWCC	3rd place, bronze medalist(s)	3	0	2	2	6
2010	Espoo Blues	EWCC	2nd place, silver medalist(s)	3	2	2	4	2
2014	Espoo Blues	EWCC	3rd place, bronze medalist(s)	6	3	2	5	12
2015	Espoo Blues	EWCC	3rd place, bronze medalist(s)	3	0	1	1	2
Totals				21	6	10	16	24

=== International ===
Year	Team	Event	Result	GP	G	A	Pts	PIM
1998	Finland	OG	3rd place, bronze medalist(s)	4	0	0	0	2
2000	Finland	WW	3rd place, bronze medalist(s)	5	0	0	0	2
2001	Finland	WW	4th	5	0	1	1	4
2002	Finland	OG	4th	5	1	1	2	2
2004	Finland	WW	3rd place, bronze medalist(s)	5	0	1	1	2
2005	Finland	WW	4th	5	0	1	1	2
2006	Finland	OG	4th	5	1	0	1	8
2007	Finland	WW	4th	5	0	0	0	10
2008	Finland	WW	3rd place, bronze medalist(s)	5	1	3	4	0
2009	Finland	WW	3rd place, bronze medalist(s)	5	0	2	2	4
2010	Finland	OG	3rd place, bronze medalist(s)	5	0	0	0	2
2013	Finland	WW	4th	6	0	0	0	4
2014	Finland	OG	5th	6	0	0	0	12
Totals				66	3	9	12	54

== Awards and honours ==
Award	Year or Season
International
Olympic Bronze Medal	1998, 2010
World Championship Bronze Medal	2000, 2004, 2008, 2009
World Championship Best Defenceman	2000
World Championship All-Star Team	2008
Finland
Finnish Championship Bronze Medal	1996–97, 1997–98, 2005–06
Aurora Borealis Cup Champion	1998–99, 1999–2000, 2004–05, 2006–07, 2008–09, 2012–13, 2013–14
Finnish Player of the Year in Women's Ice Hockey	2002, 2006
European Champions Cup Best Defenceman	2005, 2010
Päivi Halonen Award (NSMs Best Defenseman)	2008–09, 2009–10, 2010–11
Naisten SM-sarja All-Star Team	2008–09, 2010–11
Finnish Championship Silver Medal	2016–17
Suomen Jääkiekkoleijona #255; Inducted to the Hockey Hall of Fame Finland	2019
Ohio State Buckeyes
WCHA Rookie of the Week	Week of 6 March 2001
NCAA Power-Play Goals Champion	2001
OSU Scholar Athlete	2001, 2002, 2003, 2004
WCHA Defensive Player of the Week	Week of 20 November 2001
WCHA Defensive Player of the Week	Week of 11 December 2001
WCHA Defensive Player of the Week	Week of 9 December 2002
Patty Kazmaier Award Top-10 Finalist	2001–02
AHCA All-America Second Team	2001–02
WCHA All-Conference Second Team	2001–02
WCHA All-Star	2001–02
WCHA All-Academic Team	2001–02, 2002–03, 2003–04
CoSIDA/ESPN At-Large Academic All-District IV Team	2002–03, 2003–04
AWHCA Scholar All-American	2002–03, 2003–04
WCHA Student-Athlete of the Year	2003–04
WCHA Postgraduate Scholarship	2005
Number retired by Ohio State Buckeyes	2008
Inducted to the Ohio State Varsity O Hall of Fame	2009

== Records ==
=== NCAA ===
Records valid through 2021–22 NCAA season.

Season

- 2nd most power-play goals (17), 2000–01 season – tied with Valerie Chouinard (2006–07)

Single-game

- Most power play goals (3), Ohio State vs. Wayne State on 2 March 2001 – tied for first with nine other players: Andie Anastos, Hilary Knight, Bridgette Prentiss, Bobbi Ross, Melanie Salatino, Jenny Schmidgall-Potter, Laura Slominski, Blayre Turnbull, and Rebecca Vint

=== WCHA ===
Records valid through 2022–23 NCAA season.

Career

- 10th most goals by a defender (34) – tied with Kerry Weiland and Rachel Ramsey
- 15th most points by a defender (99) – tied with Kobi Kawamoto

Season

- 1st most power play goals (17), 2000–01 season
- 5th most goals by a defender (19), 2000–01 season
- 10th most power play points (29), 2000–01 season – tied with Jenny Schmidgall-Potter (2002–03) and Jocelyne Lamoureux (2011–12, 2012–13)
- 19th most points per game by a defender (1.12), 2000–01
- 23rd most points by a defender (38), 2000–01 season – tied with Amber Bowman (2006–07), Courtney Kennedy (1999–2000), Satu Kiipeli (2000–01), and Michelle Sikich (1999–2000)

Single-game

- 1st most power play goals (3), Ohio State vs. Wayne State on 2 March 2001 – tied for first with six other players: Brigette Lacquette, Nadine Muzerall, Bobby Ross, Melanie Salatino, Laura Slominski, and Blayre Turnbull

=== Ohio State Buckeyes ===
Records valid through 2022–23 Ohio State Buckeyes women's ice hockey season .

Career

- 3rd most power-play goals (23) – tied with Erin Keys
- 4th most points by a defenseman (99) – tied with Jincy Dunne
- 4th most power-play points (59) – tied with Laura McIntosh
- 15th most points (99) – tied with Jincy Dunne

Season

- Most power-play goals (17), 2000–01
- Most power-play points (29), 2000–01
- 4th most points by a defenseman (38), 2000–01 – tied with Amber Bowman (2006–07)
- 6th most points by a freshman (38), 2000–01

Single-game

- Most power play goals (3), Ohio State vs. Wayne State on 2 March 2001
