= Zoya Polunina =

Russian ice hockey player

Zoya Polunina Зоя Полунина
- Born: 12 June 1991 (age 35) Bogoroditsk, Russian SFSR, Soviet Union
- Height: 173 cm (5 ft 8 in)
- Weight: 63 kg (139 lb; 9 st 13 lb)
- Position: Defense
- Played for: Tornado Moscow Region; Lokomotiv Krasnoyarsk
- National team: Russia
- Playing career: 2007–2014
Medal record
Universiade
Silver medal – second place	2013 Trentino	Ice hockey

Zoya Grigorievna Polunina (Russian: Зоя Григорьевна Полунина; born 12 June 1991) is a Russian retired ice hockey player and former member of the Russian national team.

== Playing career ==
Polunina attempted to sign up with the figure skating section of a local ice sports club in her hometown of Neryungri in 2002 but a mixup occurred and she was instead placed in the ice hockey section. Though she had no prior experience with ice hockey, she quickly developed an affinity for the sport and soon thereafter joined the girls' ice hockey team of Energiya Neryungrinskaya GRES (Russian: «Энергия» Нерюнгринской ГРЭС, lit. '"Energy" Neryungri State District Power Plant'}, coached by Alexander Litvintsev, in the nearby town of Serebryany Bor.

In November 2005, she tried out with Fakel Chelyabinsk of the Russian Women's Hockey League (RWHL) and was offered a contract but she declined to join the club due to her mother's failing health. Her first professional contract was later signed at age sixteen with Lokomotiv Krasnoyarsk.

The following season, she signed with HC Tornado (also called Tornado Moscow Region and Tornado Dmitrov) and she remained with the club for the rest of her playing career. With HC Tornado, she was a four-time Russian Champion and four-time champion of the IIHF European Women's Champions Cup (EWCC).

After making her debut with the senior national team in 2008, she and teammate Alexandra Vafina were invited to play college ice hockey by universities in the United States. Polunina did not pursue the offers, as she did not feel her English skills were strong enough and she was encouraged to stay in Russia by Litvintsev.

In spring 2012, she registered for the 2012 CWHL Draft.

=== International play ===
As a junior player with the Russian national under-18 team, she played in the inaugural IIHF U18 Women's World Championship in 2008.

She made her debut with the senior national team in the 2008–09 season, during which she participated in the 2009 IIHF Women's World Championship and won a bronze medal at the 2009 MLP Nations Cup.

Polunina was a late cut from the Olympic national team in January 2010 but was added to the final roster in place of an injured Anna Shukina. She represented Russia in the women's ice hockey tournament at the 2010 Winter Olympics in Vancouver, where she dressed for all five games and played in two.

She went on to participate in the IIHF Women's World Championships in 2011 and 2012 before retiring from ice hockey in 2014.

== Personal life ==
Polunina was born in Bogoroditsk, Tula Oblast in the Russian Soviet Federative Socialist Republic (Russian SFSR) on 12 June 1991, six months before the dissolution of the Soviet Union was finalized. She was raised by her mother in Neryungri, Sakha Republic (Yakutia) and is considered the first athlete from Yakutia to compete in the Winter Olympic Games. Her mother died when she was fourteen, at which time she moved to Serebryany Bor and was taken in by her ice hockey coach, Alexander Litvintsev, and his wife, Lena Litvintseva; she regards the Liventsev's daughter, Svetlana Litvinseva, as a sister.

Following the end of her playing career, Polunina served as general manager of Kometa Odintsovo during the 2014–15 RWHL season. She struggled to secure investors throughout the season and described the experience as eye-opening in regards to attitudes surrounding women's sport in Russia.

As of June 2021, Polunina works in the management of ZFK Zenit Saint Petersburg, a women's football club in the Russian Women's Football Championship.

She has two children.

== Awards and honors ==
- RWHL Champion: 2008–09, 2010–11, 2011–12, 2012–13
- EWCC Champion: 2009–10, 2011–12, 2012–13, 2013–14
- Winter Universiade Silver Medal: 2013
