= SKIF Nizhny Novgorod =

Russian ice hockey team (1995–2022)

SKIF Nizhny Novgorod СКИФ Нижний Новгород
- City: Nizhny Novgorod, Russia
- League: Zhenskaya Hockey League
- Founded: 1995
- Operated: 1995–2022
- Home arena: KRK Nagorny
- Colours: Blue, orange
- Head coach: Igor Averkin (2021–22)
- Captain: Angelina Goncharenko (2021–22)
- Website: hcskif.ru

Franchise history
- HK SKIF
- 1995–1996: Luzhniki Moscow
- 1996–1998: CSK VVS Moscow
- 1998–2000: Viking Moscow
- 2000–2006: SKIF Moscow
- 2006–2022: SKIF Nizhny Novgorod
- ZhHK Torpedo
- 2022–: Torpedo Nizhny Novgorod

Championships
- Russian Championships: 12 (1996, 1997, 1998, 1999, 2001, 2002, 2003, 2004, 2005, 2008, 2010, 2014)
- EWCC: 2 (2009, 2015)

HK SKIF Nizhny Novgorod (Russian: ХК СКИФ Нижний Новгород) were a Russian professional ice hockey team in the Zhenskaya Hockey League (ZhHL) until 2022, at which time their league rights were transferred to Hockey Club Torpedo and the team became ZhHK Torpedo. HC SKIF played in Nizhny Novgorod at the KRK Nagorny. SKIF won the Russian Championship in women's ice hockey twelve times, three more wins than any other team, and won the IIHF European Women's Champions Cup in 2009 and 2015.

The team was founded in Moscow in 1995 as Luzhniki Moscow. They were subsequently known as CSK VVS Moscow (1996–1998), Viking Moscow (1998–2000), and SKIF Moscow (2000–2006). In 2006 the team moved from Moscow to Nizhny Novgorod and were renamed SKIF Nizhny Novgorod.

== History ==
Following the 2021–22 ZhHL season, SKIF Nizhny Novgorod made the decision to leave the ZhHL in favor of handing over the team, including all obligations to the players and league, to HC Torpedo. HK SKIF retained all results from previous seasons, including twelve championship victories and four European Women's Champions Cup (EWCC) medals.

== Team honors ==
=== Russian Championship ===
- (gold) Russian Champion (12): 1996, 1997, 1998, 1999, 2001, 2002, 2003, 2004, 2005, 2008, 2010, 2014
- (silver) Runners-up (6): 2000, 2006, 2007, 2009, 2011, 2022

=== European Women Champions Cup ===
The European Women's Champions Cup (EWCC) was an annual international tournament for ice hockey club teams, organized by the International Ice Hockey Federation (IIHF). It was contested from 2004 until 2015 and featured the national champion in women's ice hockey from each of the participating nations.

HK SKIF participated in five EWCC tournaments and medalled at each. They were two-time European Women's Champions Cup champions, two-time EWCC silver medalists, and one-time bronze medalists.

- (gold) European Champion (2): 2009, 2015
- (silver) Runners-up (2): 2004, 2011
- (bronze) Third Place (1): 2005

== Players and personnel ==
=== 2021–22 roster ===
As of 7 February 2022

No.	Nat	Player	Pos	S/G	Age	Acquired	Birthplace
91	(Russia)	Yekaterina Ananyina	D	L	35	2019	Yekaterinburg, Sverdlovsk Oblast
42	(Russia)	Oxana Bratishcheva	F	L	26	2015	Chelyabinsk, Chelyabinsk Oblast
79	(Russia)	Landysh Falyakhova (A)	F	L	28	2014	Dva Polya Artash, Tatarstan
14	(Russia)	Alina Garipova	D	L	27	2020	Vydrino, Buryatia
2	(Russia)	Angelina Goncharenko (C)	D	L	32	2019	Moscow
5	(Russia)	Tatyana Korablina	F	R	24	2020	Lukoyanov, Nizhny Novgorod Oblast
13	(Russia)	Viktoria Kulishova	F	L	27	2015	Megion, Khanty-Mansia
94	(Russia)	Ksenia Lebedeva	D	R	23	2021	
43	(Russia)	Yekaterina Likhachyova	F	L	28	2014	Kirovo-Chepetsk, Kirov Oblast
68	(Russia)	Alyona Loginova	F	F	23	2021	
92	(Russia)	Yelena Malinovskaya	F	L	34	2020	Angarsk, Irkutsk Oblast
30	(Russia)	Valeria Merkusheva	G	L	27	2020	Moscow
38	(Russia)	Maria Nadezhdina	F	L	26	2020	Zavolzhye, Nizhny Novgorod Oblast
25	(Russia)	Olga Prokopenko	F	L	23	2020	Staritsa, Tver Oblast
26	(Russia)	Yelena Provorova	D	L	24	2016	Nizhny, Nizhny Novgorod Oblast
55	(Russia)	Alyona Shmykova	D	L	24	2017	Dzerzhinsk, Nizhny Novgorod Oblast
88	(Russia)	Yekaterina Smolina (A)	F	R	38	2020	Ust-Kamenogorsk, Kazakh SSR, Soviet Union
27	(Russia)	Alina Smurova	D	L	22	2020	Zavolzhye, Nizhny Novgorod Oblast
22	(Russia)	Alyona Starovoitova	F	L	27	2020	Korolyov, Moscow Oblast
1	(Russia)	Valeria Tarakanova	G	L	28	2014	Nizhny, Nizhny Novgorod Oblast
37	(Czech Republic)	Aneta Tejralová (A)	D	L	30	2020	Prague, Czech Republic
70	(Russia)	Karina Zolotaryova	G	L	25	2018	Glazov, Udmurtia

Coaching staff and team personnel

- Head coach: Igor Averkin
- Assistant coach: Oleg Namestnikov
- Goaltending coach: Mikhail Vorobyov
- Conditioning coach: Alexei Urazov
- Team manager: Dmitri Beschastnov
- Team doctor: Leonid Pavlovich
- Masseur: Ksenia Baybakova

Front office

- General manager: Vladimir Golubovich
- Sports director: Yelena Guslistaya
- Manager of Hockey Operations: Anton Kolesnikov
- President: Sergei Kolotnev

=== Team captaincy history ===
- Alyona Khomich, 2009–2011
- Alexandra Kapustina, 2011–2015
- Maria Pechnikova, 2015–2017
- Anastasia Smirnova, 2017–18
- Alexandra Kapustina, 2018–19
- Anna Shchukina, 2019–20
- Angelina Goncharenko, 2020–2022

=== Head coaches ===
- Georgi Yevtyukhin, 2008–09 (replaced mid-season)
- Yevgeni Bobariko, 2008–09 (promoted mid-season from assistant coach)
- Oleg Namestnikov, 2014 (promoted mid-season from assistant coach)–2016
- Vladimir Golubovich, 2017–2019
- Sergei Filin, 2019–20
- Vladimir Golubovich, 2020–21
- Igor Averkin, 2021–22

== Notable alumnae ==
Years active with SKIF listed alongside player name.

- Yelena Byalkovskaya, 1996–2004
- Maria Belova, 2010–2020
- Alexandra Kapustina, 2008–2015
- Lidiya Malyavko, 2019–2021
- Larisa Mishina, 1995–2004
- Olga Semenets, 2008–2019
- Yelena Silina, 2003–2020
- Violetta Simanova, 1995–2004
- Anastasia Smirnova, 2007–2020
- Olga Sosina, 2008–2015
- Larisa Teplygina, 1996–2015
- Svetlana Trefilova, 1995–2000
- Oxana Tretyakova, 2003–2012
- Tatyana Tsaryova, 1995–2000
- Viktoria Volobuyeva, 1996–2005
- Lyudmila Yurlova, 1995–2008

=== International players ===
- (Ukraine) Tatyana Chizhova, 2016–2020
- (Finland) Jenni Hiirikoski, 2008–09 & 2011–12
- (Hungary) Alexandra Huszák, 2015–16
- (Finland) Mira Jalosuo, 2013–2015
- (Hungary) Franciska Kiss-Simon, 2015–2018
- (Finland) Kati Kovalainen, 2007–2009
- (Finland) Karoliina Rantamäki, 2007–2019
- (Finland) Meeri Räisänen, 2014–15
- (Finland) Noora Räty, 2013–14
- (Finland) Nora Tallus, 2007–08
- (Finland) Emma Terho, 2007–08
- (Finland) Anna Vanhatalo, 2010–11
- (Finland) Marjo Voutilainen, 2008–09

=== European Women's Cup Champion rosters ===
==== 2009 EWCC champions ====
The SKIF Nizhny Novgorod team that won the 2009 European Women's Champions Cup with head coach Yevgeni Bobariko and assistant coach Georgy Yevtyukhin.

Goaltenders: Nadezhda Alexandrova, Alyona Kropachyova
Defensemen: Jenni Hiirikoski, Alexandra Kapustina, Alyona Khomich, Kati Kovalainen, Viktoria Samarina, Anna Shchukina, Larisa Teplygina
Forwards: Yulia Deulina, Yelena Guslistaya, Karoliina Rantamäki, Olga Semenets, Yelena Silina, Olga Sosina, Tatiana Sotnikova, Svetlana Terentieva, Svetlana Tkacheva, Oksana Vitalyevna Tretyakova, Marjo Voutilainen

==== 2015 EWCC champions ====
The SKIF Nizhny Novgorod team that won the 2015 European Women's Champions Cup with head coach Oleg Namestnikov and assistant coach Alexei Kurilov.

Goaltenders: Irina Gashennikova, Meeri Räisänen
Defensemen: Maria Bodrikova, Mira Jalosuo, Alexandra Kapustina (C), Maria Pechnikova, Anastasia Smirnova, Larisa Teplygina
Forwards: Maria Belova, Landysh Falyakhova, Yekaterina Likhachyova, Maria Nadezhdina, Alsu Rakhimova, Karoliina Rantamäki, Olga Semenets (A), Nadezhda Shiryayeva, Yelena Silina (A), Olga Sosina, Anna Timofeyeva
