= Yekaterina Likhachyova =

Russian ice hockey player

Yekaterina Likhachyova Екатерина Лихачёва
- Born: 24 August 1998 (age 26); Kirovo-Chepetsk, Russia
- Height: 171 cm (5 ft 7 in)
- Weight: 63 kg (139 lb; 9 st 13 lb)
- Position: Forward
- Shoots: Left
- ZhHL team Former teams: Torpedo Nizhny Novgorod; SKIF Nizhny Novgorod
- National team: Russia
- Playing career: 2014–present

Yekaterina Sergeyevna Likhachyova (Russian: Екатери́на Серге́евна Лихачёва; born 24 August 1998) is a Russian ice hockey player and member of the Russian national team, currently playing in the Zhenskaya Hockey League (ZhHL) with Torpedo Nizhny Novgorod.

Likhachyova participated in the women's ice hockey tournament at the 2018 Winter Olympics with the Olympic Athletes from Russia women's ice hockey team and represented the Russian Olympic Committee (ROC) at the 2021 IIHF Women's World Championship.
