= 2006 IIHF European Women's Champions Cup =

International ice hockey club tournament

Tournament details
- Host countries: Sweden; Germany; Latvia; Romania
- Venue(s): 5 (in 5 host cities)
- Dates: Qualifiers; 6–8 October 2006; Finals; 5–10 December 2006
- Teams: 17

Final positions
- Champions: (Sweden) AIK IF (3rd title)
- Runner-up: (Russia) Tornado Moscow Region
- Third place: (Sweden) Segeltorps IF
- Fourth place: (Finland) Ilves Tampere

Tournament statistics
- Scoring leader(s): Finals; Maria Rooth, AIK IF (8 points)

The 2006 IIHF European Women's Champions Cup was the third holding of the IIHF European Women's Champions Cup. AIK IF Solna of Sweden's Riksserien won the tournament for the third consecutive time.

An additional group was introduced in the Qualification of this tournament, adding four teams and bringing the total number of participating teams to seventeen from sixteen countries. As the defending cup holders, AIK IF progressed directly to the Super Final and did not participate in the Qualification.

Like the other IIHF tournaments in the 2006–07 season, games in this year's tournament could no longer end in a tie. If no winner was determined after overtime, the game would progress to a shootout. The change necessitated a reassessment of points awarded for match outcomes: three points were awarded for a regulation win, two points for an overtime/shootout win, one point for a regulation loss, and no points/zero points for an overtime/shootout loss.

Each of the Qualification groups and the Super Final were played as single round-robin tournaments.

== Qualification ==
=== Group A ===
Pos	Team	Pld	W	OTW	OTL	L	GF	GA	GD	Pts
1	(Sweden) Segeltorps IF	3	3	0	0	0	36	1	+35	9
2	(France) HC Cergy-Pontoise	3	2	0	0	1	14	13	+1	6
3	(Italy) HC Eagles Bozen	3	1	0	0	2	6	14	−8	3
4	(United Kingdom) Newcastle Lady Vipers	3	0	0	0	3	3	31	−28	0

=== Group B ===
Pos	Team	Pld	W	OTW	OTL	L	GF	GA	GD	Pts
1	(Finland) Ilves Tampere	3	3	0	0	0	44	1	+43	9
2	(Latvia) SHK Laima Riga	3	2	0	0	1	25	8	+17	6
3	(Norway) Vålerenga IF Oslo	3	1	0	0	2	19	14	+5	3
4	(Estonia) Dreamland Queens Tallinn	3	0	0	0	3	0	65	−65	0

=== Group C ===
Pos	Team	Pld	W	OTW	OTL	L	GF	GA	GD	Pts
1	(Switzerland) HC Lugano	3	3	0	0	0	24	5	+19	9
2	(Germany) OSC Berlin	3	2	0	0	1	20	5	+15	6
3	(Denmark) Herlev Hornets	3	1	0	0	2	7	9	−2	3
4	(Hungary) Ferencváros Stars Budapest	3	0	0	0	3	1	33	−32	0

=== Group D ===
Pos	Team	Pld	W	OTW	OTL	L	GF	GA	GD	Pts
1	(Russia) HC Tornado	3	3	0	0	0	54	1	+53	9
2	(Kazakhstan) Aisulu Almaty	3	2	0	0	1	25	9	+16	6
3	(Slovakia) MHK Martin	3	1	0	0	2	11	35	−24	3
4	(Romania) SC Miercurea Ciuc	3	0	0	0	3	4	49	−45	0

== Super Final ==
Pos	Team	Pld	W	OTW	OTL	L	GF	GA	GD	Pts
1st place, gold medalist(s)	(Sweden) AIK	4	4	0	0	0	20	4	+16	12
2nd place, silver medalist(s)	(Russia) HC Tornado	4	3	0	0	1	12	6	+6	9
3rd place, bronze medalist(s)	(Sweden) Segeltorps IF	4	2	0	0	2	9	12	−3	6
4	(Finland) Ilves Tampere	4	1	0	0	3	8	13	−5	3
5	(Switzerland) HC Lugano	4	0	0	0	4	5	19	−14	0
