= Yelena Silina =

Russian ice hockey player

- Born: 20 June 1987 (age 39) Moscow, Russia
- Height: 1.64 m (5 ft 5 in)
- Weight: 58 kg (128 lb; 9 st 2 lb)
- Position: Forward
- Shoots: Left
- WHL team: SKIF Nizhny Novgorod
- National team: Russia
- Playing career: 2008–present
Medal record
World Championship
Bronze medal – third place	2016 Canada

Yelena Silina (born 20 June 1987) is a Russian ice hockey player for SKIF Nizhny Novgorod and the Russian national team. She participated at the 2015 and 2016 IIHF Women's World Championships.
