= 2004 IIHF European Women's Champions Cup =

International ice hockey club tournament

Tournament details
- Host countries: Sweden; Italy; Latvia
- Venue(s): 3 (in 3 host cities)
- Dates: Qualifiers; 15–17 October 2004; Finals; 16–18 December 2004
- Teams: 10

Final positions
- Champions: (Sweden) AIK IF (1st title)
- Runner-up: (Russia) SKIF Moscow
- Third place: (Switzerland) EV Zug
- Fourth place: (Finland) Espoo Blues

Tournament statistics
- Scoring leader(s): Finals; Pernilla Winberg, AIK IF (6 points)

The 2004–05 IIHF European Women's Champions Cup was the first tournament held for the IIHF European Women's Champions Cup. AIK Hockey Dam of Sweden's Riksserien won the tournament for the first time.

== Qualification ==
The qualification round was played during 15–17 October 2004. The winner of each group moved on to the Finals.

=== Group A ===
Host City: Ventspils, Latvia

Pos	Team	Pld	W	D	L	GF	GA	GD	Pts
1	(Russia) SKIF Moscow	3	3	0	0	21	4	+17	6
2	(Kazakhstan) DSHNK Almaty	3	2	0	1	20	4	+16	4
3	(Latvia) SHK Laima Riga	3	1	0	2	9	11	−2	2
4	(Slovakia) MHK Martin	3	0	0	3	1	32	−31	0

=== Group B ===
Host City: Bolzano, Italy

Pos	Team	Pld	W	D	L	GF	GA	GD	Pts
1	(Switzerland) EV Zug	3	3	0	0	12	2	+10	6
2	(France) HC Cergy-Pontoise	3	1	1	1	9	10	−1	3
3	(Denmark) Herlev Eagles	3	0	2	1	9	11	−2	2
4	(Italy) HC Eagles Bozen	3	0	1	2	7	14	−7	1

== Finals ==
The tournament finals were held 16–18 December 2004. The round was hosted in Solna, Sweden.

Pos	Team	Pld	W	D	L	GF	GA	GD	Pts
1	(Sweden) AIK	3	2	1	0	14	7	+7	5
2	(Russia) SKIF Moscow	3	1	1	1	7	5	+2	3
3	(Switzerland) EV Zug	3	1	0	2	6	13	−7	2
4	(Finland) Espoo Blues	3	1	0	2	7	9	−2	2

=== Best Players Selected by the Directorate ===
Award	No.	Name	Team
Best Goalkeeper	30	Kim Martin (SWE)	(Sweden) AIK IF
Best Defenceman	33	Päivi Halonen (FIN)	(Finland) Espoo Blues
Best Forward	7	Danijela Rundqvist (SWE)	(Sweden) AIK IF
