= Jessica Hammerl =

German ice hockey player

- Born: July 10, 1988 (age 36); Landshut, West Germany
- Height: 5 ft 3 in (160 cm)
- Weight: 134 lb (61 kg; 9 st 8 lb)
- Position: Defence
- Shoots: Left
- National team: Germany
- Playing career: 2011–present

Jessica Hammerl (born July 10, 1988 in Landshut, West Germany) is a German ice hockey defender.

== International career ==
Hammerl was selected for the Germany women's national ice hockey team in the 2014 Winter Olympics. She did not record a point in the five games.

Hammerl also played for Germany in the qualifying event for the 2014 Winter Olympics.

As of 2014, Hammerl has also appeared for Germany at three IIHF Women's World Championships. Her first appearance came in 2011.

== Career statistics ==
=== International career ===
Through 2013-14 season

| Year | Team | Event | GP | G | A | Pts | PIM |
|---|---|---|---|---|---|---|---|
| 2011 | Germany | WW DI | 4 | 0 | 1 | 1 | 0 |
| 2012 | Germany | WW | 5 | 0 | 0 | 0 | 6 |
| 2013 | Germany | OlyQ | 3 | 0 | 0 | 0 | 2 |
| 2013 | Germany | WW | 5 | 0 | 0 | 0 | 4 |
| 2014 | Germany | Oly | 5 | 0 | 0 | 0 | 2 |
