= Anja Weisser =

German ice hockey player

- Born: 2 October 1991 (age 33); Marktoberdorf, Germany
- Height: 5 ft 9 in (175 cm)
- Weight: 163 lb (74 kg; 11 st 9 lb)
- Position: Defense
- Shoots: L
- National team: Germany
- Playing career: 2008–present

Anja Weisser (also spelled Weißer; born 2 October 1991 in Marktoberdorf, Germany) is a German ice hockey defender.

== International career ==
Weisser was selected for the Germany women's national ice hockey team in the 2014 Winter Olympics. She had one assists.

As of 2014, Weisser has also appeared for Germany at two IIHF Women's World Championships. Her first appearance came in 2011.

Weisser made two appearances for the Germany women's national under-18 ice hockey team, at the IIHF World Women's U18 Championships, with the first in 2008.

== Career statistics ==
=== International career ===
Through 2013–14 season

Year	Team	Event	GP	G	A	Pts	PIM
2008	Germany U18	U18	5	1	0	1	4
2009	Germany U18	U18	5	0	2	2	10
2012	Germany	WW	5	0	0	0	2
2013	Germany	WW	5	0	0	0	4
2014	Germany	Oly	5	0	1	1	4
