= Daniela Diaz =

Switzerland ice hockey player

- Born: 16 June 1982 (age 43) Baar, Switzerland
- Height: 1.70 m (5 ft 7 in)
- Weight: 68 kg (150 lb; 10 st 10 lb)
- Position: Forward
- Played for: EV Zug; SC Reinach; KSC Küssnacht
- National team: Switzerland
- Playing career: 1996–2008

Daniela Diaz (born 16 June 1982) is a Swiss ice hockey coach and former player. She coached the Swiss national team at the 2017 IIHF Women's World Championship.

Her brother Raphael Diaz is also a hockey player.
