= Emilia Ramboldt =

Swedish ice hockey player

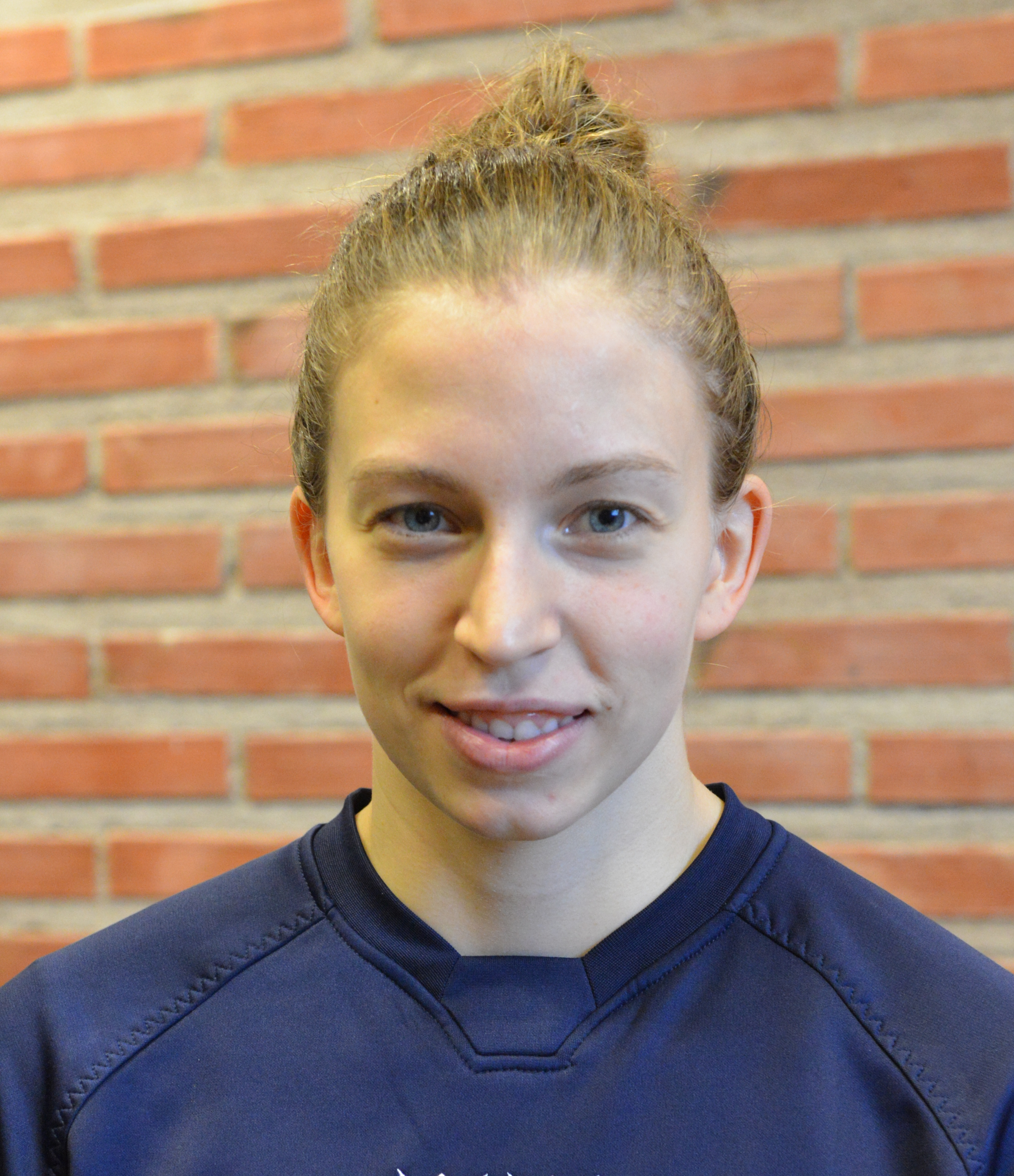
- Ramboldt in February 2016
- Born: 31 August 1988 (age 38) Sollentuna, Sweden
- Height: 5 ft 9 in (175 cm)
- Weight: 157 lb (71 kg; 11 st 3 lb)
- Position: Defence
- Shoots: Left
- Played for: Linköping HC; AIK IF; Segeltorps IF; Minnesota State Mavericks
- National team: Sweden
- Playing career: 2001–present
Medal record
World Championship
Bronze medal – third place	2007 Canada

Emilia Ingrid Maria Andersson Ramboldt née Andersson (born 31 August 1988) is a Swedish ice hockey defenceman. She was a member of the Swedish national team for twelve seasons, playing in eight IIHF Women's World Championships and at the Winter Olympics in 2010, 2014, and 2018. Ramboldt was named Riksserien Player of the Year for the 2014–15 season.

== Playing career ==
Ramboldt was born 31 August 1988 in Sollentuna, a municipality bordering Stockholm, in Stockholm County, Sweden. As a child, she was often at the ice rink because three of her brothers played hockey and she recalls asking her mother if she could start figure skating since they were already at the rink all the time but her mother said no and encouraged her to take up ice hockey instead. Her youth club was Gillbo IF, the same club as future NHLer Patric Hörnqvist, and though they were never on the same team due to their nearly two-year age difference, the two often played one another in pick-up games at the Gillbo ice rink along with other neighborhood kids, including Ramboldt's younger brothers.

=== NCAA ===
In her freshman season with the Minnesota State Mavericks, Andersson compiled 18 points, of which, nine came through the power play. Among freshmen, she was the team leader in scoring, and second overall among all blueliners on the club.

== Personal life ==
Emilia Andersson married Anna Ramboldt in Linköping, Sweden, on 13 June 2015. Originally from Minnesota, Anna Ramboldt attended Saint Mary's University of Minnesota, where she played as an infielder with the school's fastpitch softball team and studied criminal justice. The two were introduced by a mutual friend in 2012 and began dating soon thereafter. Their son Walter was born in 2017.

== International play ==
Andersson competed in the Swedish Champion Cup. She was part of a first-place finish in 2006–07 and a second-place finish in 2007–08, respectively.

She was on the Sweden roster for the 4 Nations Tournament in December 2015.

== Career stats ==
=== Sweden ===
Year	Event	GP	G	A	Pts	PIM
2010	2010 Olympic Winter Games	4	0	1	1	4

=== NCAA ===
Year	GP	G	A	Pts	PIM	PPG	SHG	GWG
2008–09	34	4	14	18	22	2	0	0
2010–11	32	0	4	4	26	0	0	0
2011–12	4	1	0	1	8	0	0	0

== Awards and honors ==
- 2008–09 Minnesota State Mavericks Rookie of the Year
