= Yulia Deulina =

Russian ice hockey forward

- Born: April 18, 1984 (age 40); Krasnogorsk, Russian SSR, Soviet Union
- Height: 5 ft 7 in (170 cm)
- Weight: 148 lb (67 kg; 10 st 8 lb)
- Position: Forward
- Shoots: Right
- National team: Russia
- Playing career: 2010–present

Yulia Sergeevna Deulina (born 14 April 1984 in Krasnogorsk, Russian SSR, Soviet Union) is a Russian ice hockey forward.

== International career ==
Deulina was selected for the Russia national women's ice hockey team in the 2010 Winter Olympics. She did not record a point in five games.

== Career statistics ==
=== International career ===
Year	Team	Event	GP	G	A	Pts	PIM
2010	Russia	Oly	5	0	0	0	0
