= Yekaterina Smolina =

Russian ice hockey player

Yekaterina Smolina Екатерина Смолина
- Born: 8 October 1988 (age 38) Ust-Kamenogorsk, Kazakh SSR, Soviet Union
- Height: 1.62 m (5 ft 4 in)
- Weight: 58 kg (128 lb; 9 st 2 lb)
- Position: Forward
- Shoots: Right
- ZhHL team Former teams: SKIF Nizhny Novgorod; Dynamo St. Petersburg; Tornado Moscow Region; Djurgårdens IF Hockey
- National team: Russia
- Playing career: 2002–present
Medal record
World Championship
Bronze medal – third place	2013 Canada
Bronze medal – third place	2016 Canada

Yekaterina Anatolievna "Katya" Smolina (Russian: Екатерина Анатольевна Смолина; born 8 October 1988) is a Russian ice hockey forward, currently playing with SKIF Nizhny Novgorod of the Zhenskaya Hockey League (ZhHL). She was a member of the Russian national ice hockey team during 2005 to 2019 and participated in three Winter Olympic Games and eight IIHF Women's World Championships.

== International career ==
Smolina was selected for the Russia women's national ice hockey team in the 2006 and 2014 Winter Olympics. In 2006, she didn't have a point in five games, and in 2014, she played in all six games, recording one assist.

As of 2014, Smolina has also appeared for Russia at five IIHF Women's World Championships. Her appearance came in 2007. She won a bronze medal as a part of the team in 2013 and 2016.

== Career statistics ==
=== International career ===
Through 2013–14 season

Year	Team	Event	GP	G	A	Pts	PIM
2006	Russia	Oly	5	0	0	0	12
2007	Russia	WW	4	0	1	1	0
2008	Russia	WW	4	0	0	0	2
2009	Russia	WW	4	0	0	0	0
2012	Russia	WW	5	0	0	0	2
2013	Russia	WW	6	0	1	1	2
2014	Russia	Oly	6	0	1	1	0
