= Olga Permyakova =

Russian ice hockey defender (born 1982)

- Born: April 12, 1982 (age 43) Chelyabinsk, Russian SSR, Soviet Union
- Height: 5 ft 6 in (168 cm)
- Weight: 146 lb (66 kg; 10 st 6 lb)
- Position: Defence
- Shoots: Left
- National team: Russia
- Playing career: 2002–present

Olga Viktorovna Permyakova (born 12 April 1982 in Chelyabinsk, Russian SSR, Soviet Union) is a Russian ice hockey defender.

== International career ==
Permyakova was selected for the Russia national women's ice hockey team in the 2002, 2006 and 2010 Winter Olympics. In 2002, she recorded one point in five games. In 2006, she played in three games without recording a point. In 2010, she had two assists in four games.. She also played in the qualifying tournament for the 2006 Olympics.

Permyakova has also appeared for Russia at seven IIHF Women's World Championships. Her first appearance came in 2004. She was a member of the team that won a bronze medal at the 2001 IIHF Women's World Championship.

== Career statistics ==
=== International career ===
| Year | Team | Event | GP | G | A | Pts | PIM |
|---|---|---|---|---|---|---|---|
| 2002 | Russia | Oly | 5 | 0 | 1 | 1 | 6 |
| 2004 | Russia | WW | 4 | 1 | 0 | 1 | 6 |
| 2004 | Russia | OlyQ | 2 | 0 | 0 | 0 | 2 |
| 2005 | Russia | WW | 5 | 0 | 2 | 2 | 4 |
| 2006 | Russia | Oly | 3 | 0 | 0 | 0 | 0 |
| 2007 | Russia | WW | 4 | 0 | 1 | 1 | 4 |
| 2008 | Russia | WW | 4 | 0 | 0 | 0 | 2 |
| 2009 | Russia | WW | 4 | 0 | 2 | 2 | 0 |
| 2010 | Russia | Oly | 4 | 0 | 2 | 2 | 10 |
| 2011 | Russia | WW | 4 | 1 | 2 | 3 | 0 |
| 2012 | Russia | WW | 5 | 0 | 0 | 0 | 4 |
