= Danijela Rundqvist =

Swedish ice hockey player

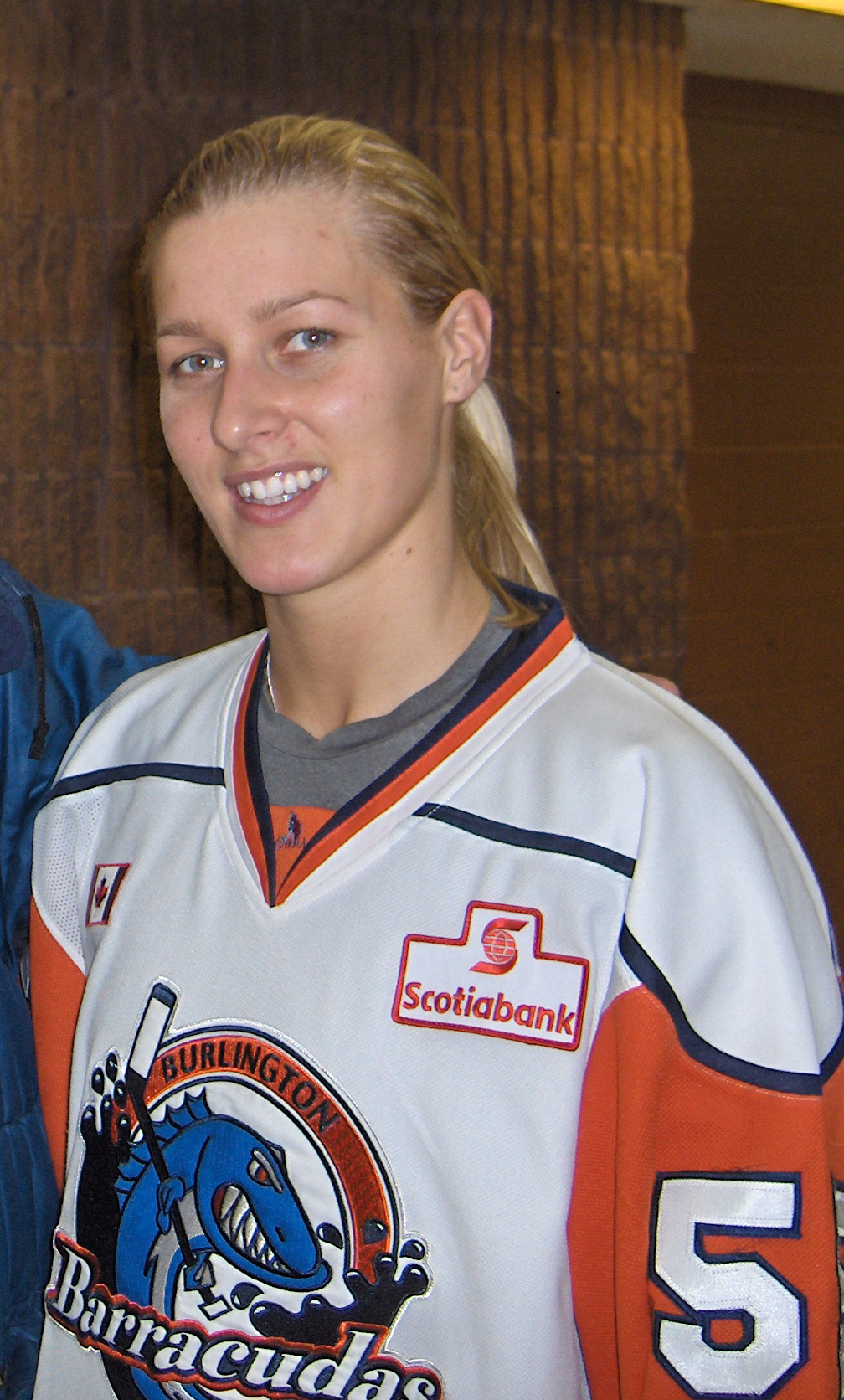
- Rundqvist with the Burlington Barracudas in 2010
- Born: 26 September 1984 (age 42) Stockholm, Sweden
- Height: 177 cm (5 ft 10 in)
- Weight: 74 kg (163 lb; 11 st 9 lb)
- Position: Forward
- Shot: Left
- Played for: Djurgårdens IF Hockey; SDE Hockey; Lugano Ladies Team; HC Tornado; Burlington Barracudas; AIK IF
- National team: Sweden
- Playing career: 2001–2020
Medal record
Women's ice hockey
Representing Sweden
Olympic Games
Silver medal – second place	2006 Turin	Ice hockey
Bronze medal – third place	2002 Salt Lake City	Ice hockey
World Championship
Bronze medal – third place	2005 Sweden
Bronze medal – third place	2007 Canada

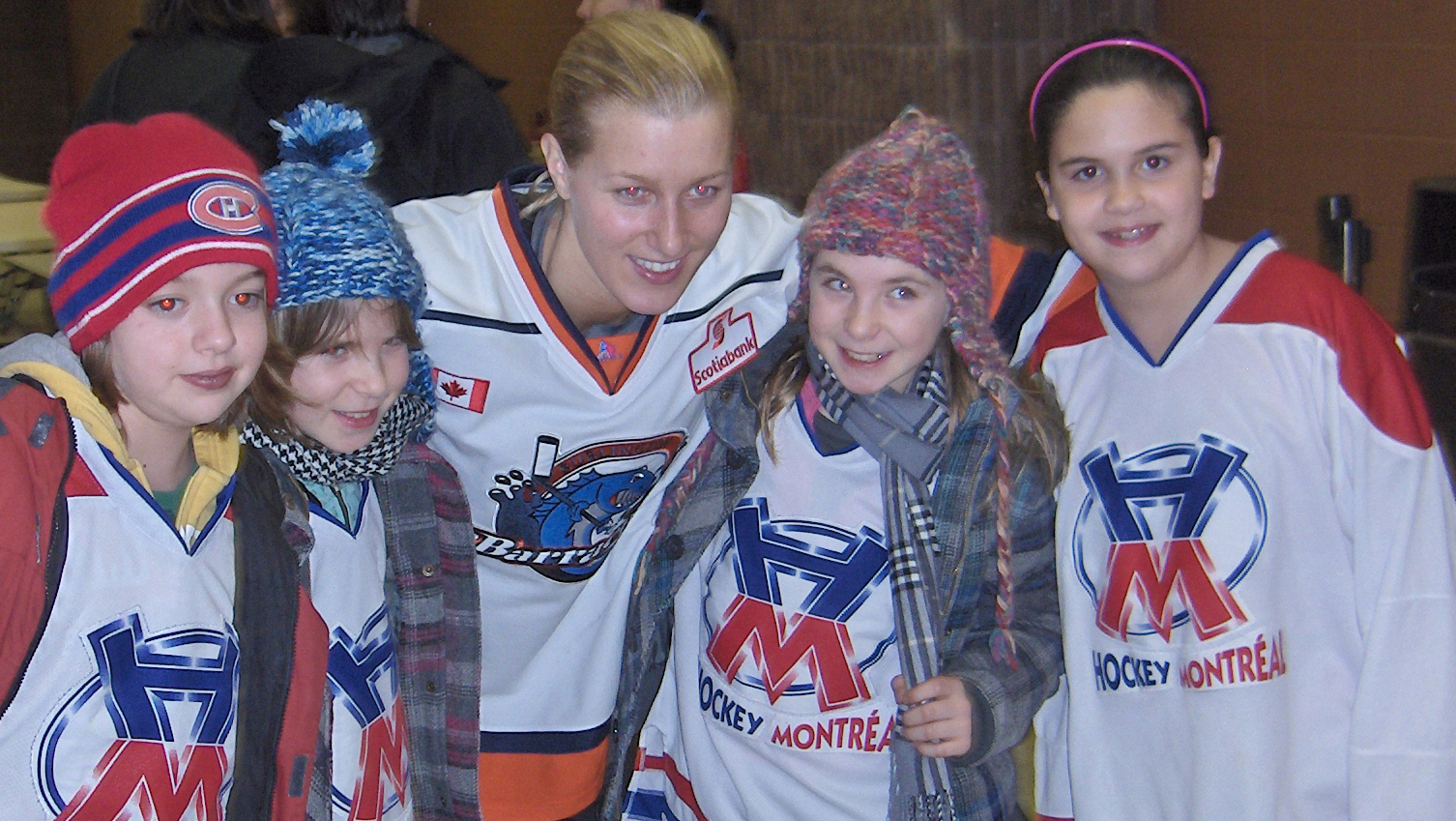
Rundqvist with young fans in 2016

Danijela Kristina Rundqvist (born 26 September 1984) is a Swedish retired ice hockey player and three time Olympian with the Swedish national ice hockey team.

== Playing career ==
Rundqvist plays hockey at the forward position. She was trained in Kälvesta SK. In 2001, she joined AIK IF. Historically, the club won national championships in 2004, 2007 and 2009, as well as the IIHF European Women's Champions Cup in 2005, 2006, 2007, and 2008.

Of note, she is a member of the Sweden women's national ice hockey team. She won a silver medal at the 2006 Winter Olympics and a bronze medal at the 2002 Winter Olympics.

In 2010, she was chosen in the 13th position during the 2010 CWHL Draft of Canadian Women's Hockey League. Rundqvist left her native Sweden to compete for Burlington Barracudas, based in Ontario, Canada.

In 2011–12, Rundqvist played with Team Sweden teammates Elin Holmlov and Kim Martin for Moscow Tornado of the Russian Professional Women's League.

== Career stats ==
Season	League	Team	games	goals	assists	pts	+/-	PIM
2003–04	SM-Slutspel Women (SWE)	AIK IF	5	7	0	7	+9	8
2004–05	SM-Slutspel Women (SWE)	AIK IF	5	1	0	1	+2	12
2005	Women's Hockey World Cup	National Team Sweden	5	1	0	1	−1	10
2005–06	IIHF European Women's Champions Cup	AIK IF	3	1	3	4	+2	6
2005–06	SM-Slutspel Women (SWE)	AIK IF	3	3	1	4	+2	6
2006	Winter Olympic Games	National Team Sweden	5	0	0	0	−1	10
2006–07	SM-Slutspel Women (SWE)	AIK IF	3	2	0	2	+3	2
2007	Women's Hockey World Cup	National Team Sweden	5	1	1	2	+2	0
2007–08	SM-Slutspel Women (SWE)	AIK IF	14	12	9	21	+19	16
2008-9	SM-Slutspel Women (SWE)	AIK IF	17	7	9	16	+10	20
2009–10	SM-Slutspel Women (SWE)	AIK IF	15	9	8	17	0	32
2010	Winter Olympic Games	National Team Sweden	5	2	0	2	−5	2
2010–11	Canadian Women's Hockey League	Burlington Barracudas	22	11	4	15	+11	36
2011	Women's Hockey World Cup	National Team Sweden	5	0	2	2	−2	4

== Personal ==
Danijela has a younger sister, Sandra, and a younger brother Alexander. She is half Serbian; her mother is a Kosovo Serb.

== See also ==
- Sweden women's national ice hockey team
