= Anna Shukina =

Russian ice hockey player

Anna Shukina Анна Щукина
- Born: 5 November 1987 (age 38) Balakirevo, Russian SFSR, Soviet Union
- Height: 1.71 m (5 ft 7 in)
- Weight: 86 kg (190 lb; 13 st 8 lb)
- Position: Defence
- Shot: Left
- Played for: SKIF Nizhny Novgorod; Tornado Moscow Region; Dinamo Saint Petersburg; Agidel Ufa
- National team: Russia
- Playing career: 2007–2021
Medal record
Women's ice hockey
Representing Russia
World Championship
Bronze medal – third place	2013 Canada
Bronze medal – third place	2016 Canada
Universiade
Gold medal – first place	2015 Granada
Silver medal – second place	2013 Trentino

Anna Vasilyevna Shukina (Russian: Анна Васильевна Щукина, romanized: Anna Vasil'yevna Shchukina; also transliterated as Shchukina or Schukina; born 5 November 1987) is a Russian retired ice hockey defenceman and former member of the Russian national ice hockey team.

In December 2017, Shukina was banned for life by the Oswald Commission of the International Olympic Committee (IOC) for doping violations made while participating in the women's ice hockey tournament at the 2014 Winter Olympics. She filed an appeal with the Court of Arbitration for Sport (CAS) and, in 2018, won the appeal and the sanctions against her were annulled.

Shukina has twice been on Russian Championship-winning teams, Tornado Dmitrov in 2015 and Agidel Ufa in 2017. She has also received individual Zhenskaya Hockey League (ZhHL) awards for Most Goals by a Defenceman in the 2015–16 season, while playing with Dinamo Saint Petersburg, and in the 2016–17 season, while playing with Agidel Ufa, and Most Points by a Defenceman in the 2015–16 season. She also played seven seasons with SKIF Nizhny Novgorod and served as captain during the 2019–20 season.

== International career ==
Shukina was selected for the Russian national team in the 2014 Winter Olympics. She played in all six games of the tournament and scored two goals.

Shukina represented Russia at eight IIHF Women's World Championships. Her first appearance came in 2008 and she won bronze medals as part of the team in 2013 and 2016.

Though the ban was annulled in 2018, Shukina did not represent Russia in any international competition following the 2017 IOC ban for doping violations.

== Career statistics ==
=== International career ===
Through 2013–14 season

Year	Team	Event	GP	G	A	Pts	PIM
2008	Russia	WW	4	0	0	0	2
2009	Russia	WW	4	1	0	1	4
2011	Russia	WW	6	0	0	0	4
2012	Russia	WW	5	0	1	1	2
2013	Russia	WW	6	0	0	0	0
2014	Russia	Oly	6	2	0	2	0
