= Pernilla Winberg =

Swedish ice hockey player

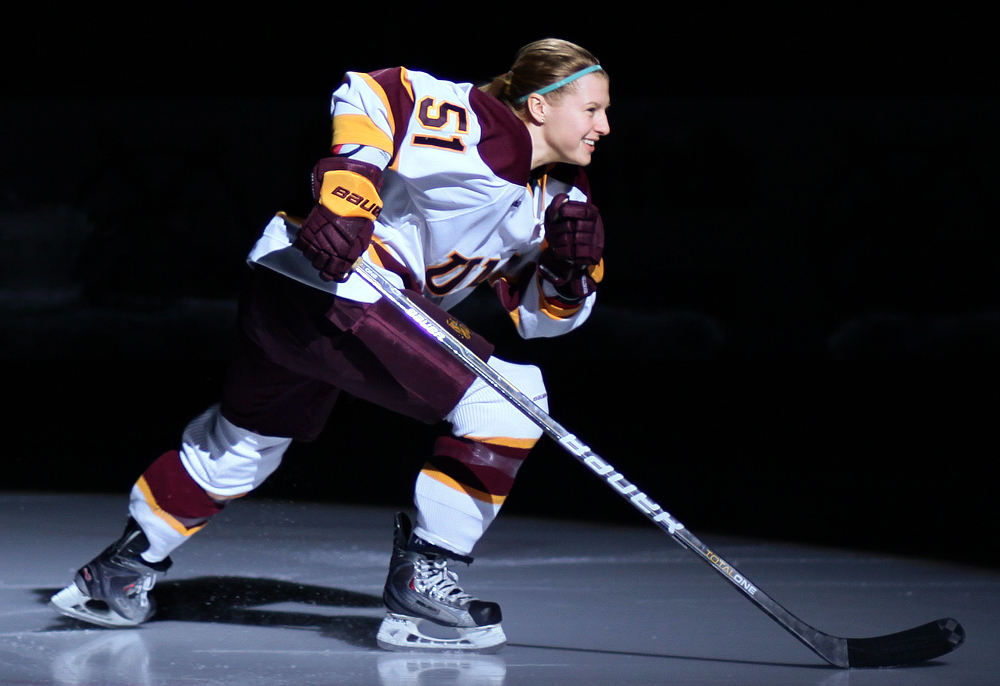
- Winberg in 2011
- Born: 24 February 1989 (age 37) Malmö, Skåne, Sweden
- Height: 1.65 m (5 ft 5 in)
- Weight: 68 kg (150 lb; 10 st 10 lb)
- Position: Forward
- Shoots: Left
- Played for: Linköping HC; Munksund Skuthamn SK; Minnesota Duluth Bulldogs; Segeltorps IF; AIK IF; Limhamn HK
- National team: Sweden
- Playing career: 2002–present
Medal record
Women's ice hockey
Representing Sweden
Olympic Games
Silver medal – second place	2006 Turin	Team
World Championships
Bronze medal – third place	2005 Sweden
Bronze medal – third place	2007 Canada

Pernilla Margareta Stephanie Winberg (born 24 February 1989) is a Swedish ice hockey retired forward, who currently serves as a commentator for C More and assistant coach for PWHL Boston. She scored 282 points across her 9 year SDHL career, winning two SDHL championships. She made over 300 appearances for the Swedish national team, winning a silver medal at the 2006 Winter Olympics.

== Career ==
She graduated from the University of Minnesota Duluth in 2013 and played for the Minnesota Duluth Bulldogs, five-time NCAA Division I national champions.

She missed three and a half weeks of the 2018–19 season due to a concussion, returning just in time for the playoffs.

In October 2019, just 7 games into the season, she suffered a severe concussion, the third in three years, forcing her to miss the rest of the 2019–20 season. A year later, in October 2020, it was announced that she would be starting a position as an expert commentator for C More's coverage of the SDHL.

In 2024, Winberg joined PWHL Boston as an assistant coach.

=== International ===
She won a silver medal at the 2006 Winter Olympics. She scored the game-winning goal in the shootout against the American women in the semi-final game, where she was Sweden's youngest national player. She would later become the last remaining player from the silver-medal winning 2006 Swedish Olympic team to retire.

At the 2010 Winter Olympics, Winberg recorded an impressive five goals in the tournament including four against Slovakia and one against the powerhouse USA.
