= 2008–09 Minnesota Duluth Bulldogs women's ice hockey season =

NCAA Frozen Four, Lost, Semifinals
- Conference: WCHA
- Home ice: Duluth Entertainment Convention Center

Record
- Overall: 26–9–4

Coaches and captains
- Head coach: Shannon Miller
- Assistant coaches: Julie Chu; Caroline Ouellette

The Minnesota Duluth Bulldogs women's ice hockey began their tenth NCAA season as the defending NCAA Champions for a fourth time in program history.

== Preseason ==
- September 22: Pernilla Winberg was named the Western Collegiate Hockey Association’s (WCHA) Preseason Rookie of the Year.

== Regular season ==
=== Standings ===
2008–09 Western Collegiate Hockey Association standings
	Conference								Overall					
	GP	W	L	T	SOW	PTS	GF	GA	GP	W	L	T	GF	GA
Minnesota†	28	23	2	3	2	51	143	42	40	32	5	3	198	69
Wisconsin*	28	21	2	5	3	50	133	42	41	34	2	5	207	53
Minnesota Duluth	28	18	6	4	1	41	109	52	39	26	9	4	150	70
St. Cloud State	28	11	14	3	2	27	63	91	37	15	18	4	85	105
Minnesota State	28	7	16	5	2	21	74	122	36	12	19	5	95	141
North Dakota	28	9	18	3	0	21	62	95	36	13	19	4	84	118
Ohio State	28	6	20	2	2	16	66	135	36	8	25	3	82	166
Bemidji State	28	3	22	3	2	11	38	109	36	6	25	5	51	125
Championship: † indicates conference regular season champion; * indicates conference tournament champion Updated July 21, 2024

- November 22: Elin Holmlöv scored four consecutive goals against North Dakota. This was the first time that a Bulldogs player scored four consecutive goals.
- January 23: Jocelyne Larocque assisted on the four goals scored in the second period against the Minnesota Golden Gophers in their 4–2 win.

== Player stats ==
= Indicates team leader

=== Skaters ===
Note: GP= Games played; G= Goals; A= Assists; PTS = Points; PIM = Penalties in minutes; GW = Game winning goals; PPL = Power-play goals; SHG = Short-handed goals

Player	GP	G	A	Pts	PIM	GW	PPL	SHG
Elin Holmlöv	34	23	28	51	51	4	7	0
Haley Irwin	39	22	22	44	96	5	8	0
Sara O'Toole	39	12	31	43	14	1	2	1
Pernilla Winberg	38	14	27	41	16	1	7	0
Jocelyne Larocque	37	4	33	37	108	1	2	0
Laura Fridfinnson	39	20	14	34	30	6	6	2
Saara Tuominen	39	12	20	32	0	1	6	0
Heidi Pelttari	39	4	23	27	12	0	3	0
Jaime Rasmussen	38	9	12	21	0	3	5	0
Tawni Mattila	39	9	7	16	24	1	1	1
Emmanuelle Blais	33	10	4	14	60	1	3	1
Jenni Asserholt	34	2	8	10	44	0	0	1
Myriam Trepanier	38	2	5	7	44	0	0	0
Sarah Murray	39	0	6	6	12	0	0	0
Tara Gray	38	3	1	4	24	1	0	0
Erin Olson	34	1	3	4	14	0	0	0
Kacy Ambroz	37	1	3	4	6	0	0	0
Libby Guzzo	38	2	0	2	0	1	0	0
Kim Martin	22	0	2	2	0	0	0	0
Justine Fisher	21	0	0	0	0	0	0	0
Tori Shelafoe	5	0	0	0	2	0	0	0
Lana Steck	5	0	0	0	0	0	0	0
Johanna Ellison	19	0	0	0	0	0	0	0

=== Goaltenders ===
Player	Games	Wins	Losses	Ties	Goals against	Minutes	GAA	Shutouts	Saves	Save %
Johanna Ellison	19	14	3	1	29	1032	1.6866	3	382	.929
Kim Martin	22	11	6	3	34	1184	1.7227	3	473	.933
Lana Steck	5	1	0	0	7	140	2.9943	0	49	.875

== Awards and honors ==
- Elin Holmlöv, WCHA’s Offensive Player of the Week (Week of November 26, 2008)
- Jocelyne Larocque, WCHA’s Offensive Player of the Week (Week of January 28, 2009), this is the first time that a UMD defender is given offensive player of the week honors
- Jocelyne Larocque, 2008–09 RBK Division I First Team All-American. No other Bulldog defenseman in program history has earned a first team selection.

=== WCHA 10th Anniversary team selections ===
- Caroline Ouellette
- Jenny Potter
- Maria Rooth
