= Iya Gavrilova =

Russian ice hockey player (born 1987)

Iya Gavrilova Ия Гаврилова
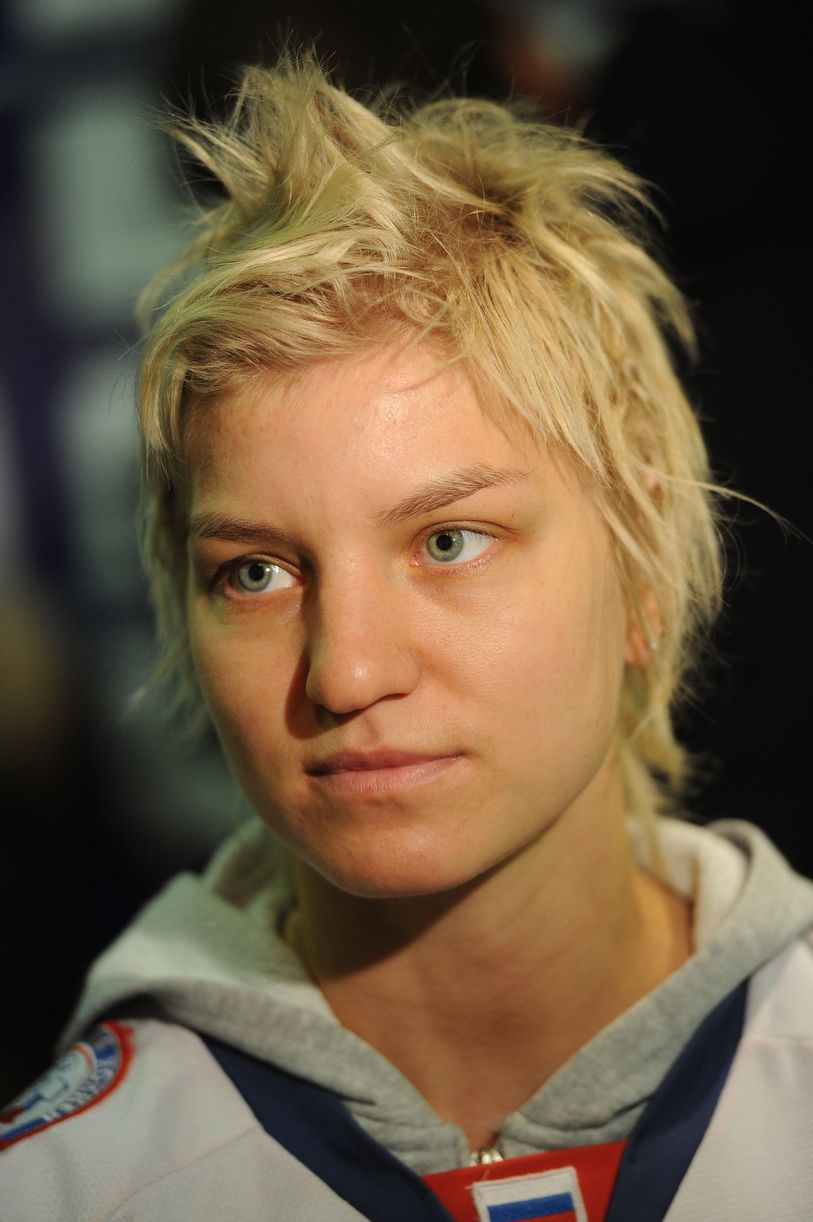
- Gavrilova in 2015
- Born: 3 September 1987 (age 39) Krasnoyarsk, Soviet Union
- Height: 173 cm (5 ft 8 in)
- Weight: 65 kg (143 lb; 10 st 3 lb)
- Position: Forward
- Shoots: Left
- Played for: PWHPA Calgary; Calgary Inferno; Calgary Dinos; Minnesota Whitecaps; Tornado Moscow Region; Minnesota Duluth Bulldogs; SKIF Moscow; Lokomotiv Krasnoyarsk
- National team: Russia
- Playing career: 1998–present
Medal record
World Championship
Bronze medal – third place	2013 Canada
Bronze medal – third place	2016 Canada
Winter Universiade
Gold medal – first place	2015 Spain

Iya Viktorovna Gavrilova (Russian: Ия Викторовна Гаврилова; born 3 September 1987) is a Russian ice hockey player. She was a member of the Russian national team from 2003 to 2016 and represented Russia at the Winter Olympic Games in 2006, 2010, and 2014 and at eleven IIHF Women's World Championships, winning bronze medals at the tournaments in 2013 and 2016. At the 2015 Winter Universiade in Granada, Spain, Gavrilova was part of Russia's gold medal-winning team, the first team to defeat Canada in FISU women's ice hockey history.

== Playing career ==
Gavrilova’s ice hockey career started in 1998, in the Russian Women's Hockey League with Lokomotiv Krasnoyarsk. She began playing with SKIF Moscow in 2002 and later played with Tornado Moscow Region during the 2006–07, 2008–09, and 2009–10 seasons.

She joined the Minnesota Duluth Bulldogs women's ice hockey program during the 2007–08 season, tallying 19 goals and 22 assists for 41 points in 26 games; she ranked second on the team for points per game with an exceptional 1.58 in her rookie campaign. With the Bulldogs, she played alongside stars of a number of national teams, including Haley Irwin and Myriam Trépanier of Canada, Jocelyne Larocque and Meghan Duggan of the United States, Saara Niemi (née Tuominen) and Heidi Pelttari of Finland, and Elin Holmlöv and Kim Martin Hasson of Sweden, and Sarah Murray, the future head coach of the Korea women's unified ice hockey team.

Gavrilova also played with the Minnesota Whitecaps of the Western Women's Hockey League (WWHL) during the 2010–11 season.

=== Calgary Dinos ===
She enrolled at the University of Calgary, where she helped lead the Calgary Dinos women's ice hockey team to a CIS championship in her first season. Gavrilova received the 2015 Brodrick Trophy, awarded to the Most Outstanding Player in CIS women's ice hockey. During the 2014–15 season, she led the CIS in both goals scored and plus/minus rating.

=== CWHL ===
Gavrilova was selected in the third round of the 2016 CWHL Draft by the Calgary Inferno. Making her debut with the Calgary Inferno on 29 October 2016, in a contest against the Boston Blades, Gavrilova would also achieve her first multi-point performance with the club in her debut. Starting with a second period assist on a goal by Jillian Saulnier, she would score her first CWHL goal later in the period against Lauren Dahm. Gaining the assists on said goal were Meghan Mikkelson and Hayeligh Cudmore. In a two-game exhibition series against the Japan national women's ice hockey team, Gavrilova scored two goals in the second game and was named Player of the Game.

Following the collapse of the Canadian Women's Hockey League, Gavrilova was affiliated with the Calgary section of the Professional Women's Hockey Players Association (PWHPA) from 2019 to 2022 and with the PWHPA's Team Sonnet during the 2022–23 season.

== Personal life ==
During her college ice hockey career, Gavrilova earned a bachelor's degree in accounting from the University of Minnesota Duluth (UMD) and a BA in economics from the University of Calgary (U of C). She works as an analyst at Crescent Point Energy in Calgary, Alberta.

== Career statistics ==
=== NCAA ===
Note: GP= Games played; G= Goals; A= Assists; PTS = Points; PIM = Penalties in minutes; GW = Game winning goals; PPL = Power-play goals; SHG = Short-handed goals

Season	GP	G	A	Pts	PIM	GW	PPL	SHG
2007–08	26	19	22	41	43	7	5	0

=== WWHL ===
Season	GP	G	A	Pts	PIM	GW	PPL	SHG
2010–11	3	1	4	5	0	0	1	0

=== Olympics ===
Event	GP	G	A	Pts	PIM	+/-	Shots
2006	5	2	0	2	14	−2	11
2010	5	2	0	2	6	−2	26

=== CIS ===
Season	GP	G	A	Pts	PIM	+/-'
2014–15	37	21	16	37	18	+35

=== CWHL ===
Year	GP	G	A	PTS	PIM	PPG	SHG	GWG
2016–17	18	11	8	19	6	3	1	1

== Awards and honors ==
- 2012 Canada West First Team All-Star
- 2015 Brodrick Trophy winner
- 2015 Canada West Conference Player of the Year
- 2014–15 CIS First Team All-Star
