= 2006–07 Minnesota Duluth Bulldogs women's ice hockey season =

NCAA Frozen Four, Runner-up
- Conference: WCHA
- Home ice: Duluth Entertainment Convention Center

Record
- Overall: 24–11–4
- Home: 12–4–3
- Road: 11–7–1

Coaches and captains
- Head coach: Shannon Miller

Led by head coach Shannon Miller, the team had 128 goals for, and 68 goals against. The Bulldogs finished the season with a record of 24 wins, 11 losses and 4 ties. Their WCHA Conference record was 19 wins, 6 losses and 3 ties. In the NCAA Championship game, the Bulldogs were defeated by WCHA rival Wisconsin Badgers.

== Exhibition ==
Date	Opponent	Score	Goal scorers
Sat 09/30/2006	Minnesota Whitecaps	6–1	Emmanuelle Blais, Karine Demeule, Noemie Martin (2), Sara O'Toole (2)

== Regular season ==
=== Standings ===
2006–07 Western Collegiate Hockey Association standings
	Conference								Overall					
	GP	W	L	T	SOW	PTS	GF	GA	GP	W	L	T	GF	GA
Wisconsin†*	28	23	1	4	–	50	112	33	41	36	1	4	166	36
Minnesota Duluth	28	19	6	3	–	41	102	38	39	24	11	4	128	68
Minnesota	28	17	10	1	–	35	85	66	36	23	12	1	115	85
Ohio State	28	13	11	4	–	30	79	70	37	20	13	4	112	87
Minnesota State	28	12	14	2	–	26	78	91	35	16	17	2	108	106
Bemidji State	28	9	15	4	–	22	53	85	36	11	20	5	66	110
St. Cloud State	28	7	16	5	–	19	66	94	37	12	18	7	99	110
North Dakota	28	0	27	1	–	1	24	122	36	3	31	2	39	142
Championship: † indicates conference regular season champion; * indicates conference tournament champion Updated July 21, 2024

=== Schedule ===
Date	Opponent	Score	Record
Fri 10/06/2006	@ Minnesota State	3–1	1–0–0
Sat 10/07/2006	@ Minnesota State	6–1	2–0–0
Sat 10/14/2006	North Dakota	4–0	3–0–0
Sun 10/15/2006	North Dakota	5–0	4–0–0
Fri 10/20/2006	Bemidji State	6–2	5–0–0
Sat 10/21/2006	Bemidji State	6–0	6–0–0
Fri 10/27/2006	@ St. Cloud State	2–0	7–0–0
Sat 10/28/2006	@ St. Cloud State	6–0	8–0–0
Fri 11/03/2006	@ Minnesota	3–5	8–1–0
Sat 11/04/2006	@ Minnesota	0–1	8–2–0
Fri 11/17/2006	Minnesota State	5–5	8–2–1
Sat 11/18/2006	Minnesota State	3–5	8–3–1
Fri 11/24/2006	@ Wisconsin	2–0	9–3–1
Sat 11/25/2006	@ Wisconsin	0–1	9–4–1
Fri 12/01/2006	@ Harvard (nc)	1–3	9–5–1
Sat 12/02/2006	@ Harvard (nc)	0–4	9–6–1
Fri 12/08/2006	Ohio State	0–3	9–7–1
Sat 12/09/2006	Ohio State	9–1	10–7–1
Sat 01/06/2007	Niagara (nc)	3–3	10–7–2
Sun 01/07/2007	Niagara (nc)	2–1	11–7–2
Sat 01/13/2007	St. Cloud State	4–2	12–7–2
Sun 01/14/2007	St. Cloud State	1–0	13–7–2
Sat 01/20/2007	@ Bemidji State	5–0	14–7–2
Sun 01/21/2007	@ Bemidji State	3–1	15–7–2
Fri 01/26/2007	@ Ohio State	5–3	16–7–2
Sat 01/27/2007	@ Ohio State	1–1	16–7–3
Fri 02/02/2007	Wisconsin	1–1	16–7–4
Sat 02/03/2007	Wisconsin	1–2	16–8–4
Sat 02/10/2007	@ North Dakota	4–0	17–8–4
Sun 02/11/2007	@ North Dakota	5–1	18–8–4
Sat 02/17/2007	Minnesota	7–1	19–8–4
Sun 02/18/2007	Minnesota	5–1	20–8–4

NC indicates Non-Conference game

== Player stats ==
= Indicates team leader

=== Skaters ===
Player	Games	Goals	Assists	Points	Points/game	PIM	GWG	PPG	SHG
Noemie Marin	39	24	29	53	1.3590	0	4	8	0
Jessica Koizumi	36	22	18	40	1.1111	0	6	10	0
Saara Tuominen	39	12	28	40	1.0256	0	2	4	0
Emmanuelle Blais	39	14	21	35	0.8974	0	2	7	0
Elin Holmlov	31	6	20	26	0.8387	0	0	2	0
Michaela Lanzl	32	13	11	24	0.7500	0	4	2	0
Sara O'Toole	29	7	14	21	0.7241	0	1	4	1
Karine Demeule	39	13	4	17	0.4359	0	1	2	1
Myriam Trepanier	39	5	12	17	0.4359	0	0	3	0
Jill Sales	39	3	13	16	0.4103	0	2	0	0
Tawni Mattila	39	5	7	12	0.3077	0	1	1	0
Jaime Rasmussen	39	1	10	11	0.2821	0	0	0	0
Suvi Vacker	35	1	4	5	0.1429 0	0	0	0	
Ashly Waggoner	39	1	4	5	0.1282	0	0	0	0
Sarah Murray	34	0	2	2	0.0588	0	0	0	0
Heidi Pelttari	15	0	2	2	0.1333	0	0	0	0
Jessica Hawkins	38	1	0	1	0.0263	0	1	0	0
Amie Meyer	4	0	0	0	0.0000	0	0	0	0
Riitta Schaublin	20	0	0	0	0.0000	0	0	0	0
Erin Olson	39	0	0	0	0.0000	0	0	0	0
Kirsti Hakala	30	0	0	0	0.0000	0	0	0	0
Samantha Hough	6	0	0	0	0.0000	0	0	0	0
Kim Martin	21	0	0	0	0.0000	0	0	0	0

=== Goaltenders ===
Player	Games	Wins	Losses	Ties	Goals against	Minutes	GAA	Shutouts	Saves	Save %
Amie Meyer	4	0	0	0	0	28	0.0000	0	8	1.000
Kim Martin	21	11	7	2	32	1212	1.5847	3	507	.941
Riitta Schaublin	20	13	4	2	34	1163	1.7548	4	455	.930

== Postseason ==
=== WCHA playoffs ===
Date	Opponent	Score	Goal scorers
Fri 02/23/2007	St. Cloud State	4–3	Emmanuelle Blais, Karine Demeule, Jessica Koizumi, Saara Tuominen
Sat 02/24/2007	St. Cloud State	1–3	Michaela Lanzl
Sun 02/25/2007	St. Cloud State	5–1	Emmanuelle Blais, Noemie Marin (2), Tawni Mattila, Saara Tuominen
Sat 03/03/2007	@ Minnesota	2–3 (OT)	Jessica Koizumi, Michaela Lanzl

=== NCAA tournament ===
Date	Opponent	Score	Goal scorers
Fri 03/09/2007	@ Mercyhurst	3–2 (OT)	Michaela Lanzl, Jessica Koizumi (2),
Fri 03/16/2007	4 vs Boston College	4–3 (2 OT)	Jessica Koizumi (2), Michaela Lanzl, Noemie Marin
Sun 03/18/2007	vs Wisconsin	1–4	Emmanuelle Blais
