= 2009 IIHF Women's World Championship =

Tournament details
- Host country: Finland
- City: Hämeenlinna
- Venues: 2 (in 1 host city)
- Dates: 4–12 April 2009
- Opened by: Tarja Halonen
- Teams: 9

Final positions
- Champions: United States (3rd title)
- Runners-up: Canada
- Third place: Finland
- Fourth place: Sweden

Tournament statistics
- Games played: 20
- Goals scored: 140 (7 per game)
- Attendance: 28,614 (1,431 per game)
- Scoring leader: (United States) Julie Chu (10 points)

Awards
- MVP: (Canada) Carla MacLeod

The 2009 IIHF Women's World Championship was the 12th edition of the Top Division of the Women's Ice Hockey World Championship (the 13th edition overall, if the season when only the lower divisions were played is also counted), organized by the International Ice Hockey Federation (IIHF).

The Top Division tournament was held in Hämeenlinna, Finland, from 4 to 12 April 2009. The defending champions United States to win the gold medal and retain their top standing another year, after defeated Canada 4–1 in the final match.

This was the last world championships with nine teams in the Top Division. Two teams—Japan and China—were relegated to Division I, replaced by only one—Slovakia—promoted from there. Division I also relegated two, Czech Republic and France, while receiving only one team through promotion, Latvia, along with the two from the top division. Division II only relegated one team, the Netherlands, but did not receive any promoted teams from the lower divisions. The lower divisions of III, IV, and V, were canceled for the 2009 cycle, with the lowest seeded team in each to be dropped down one division. The final result was that the Top Division will be reduced in size by one team for 2011, while the lowest division (Division V) will increase by one team.

== Top Division ==
=== Preliminary round ===
All times are local (Eastern European Summer Time – UTC+3).

==== Group A ====
Pos	Team	Pld	W	OTW	OTL	L	GF	GA	GD	Pts	Qualification
1	United States	2	2	0	0	0	16	0	+16	6	Group D
2	Russia	2	1	0	0	1	3	9	−6	3	Group E
3	Japan	2	0	0	0	2	1	11	−10	0	Group F

Source: IIHF

4 April 2009; 17:00	Japan	0–8 (0–4, 0–1, 0–3)	United States	Arena 2, Hämeenlinna; Attendance: 347

Game reference
	Referee: (Germany) N. Hertrich
Goals / H. Knight (J. Potter, K. Stack) 4:39 (PP1); J. Chu (N. Darwitz) 12:40 (SH1); K. Stack (J. Lamoureux, K. Bellamy) 15:28; H. Knight (J. Potter, K. Stack) 17:23 (PP1); J. Lamoureux (K. Stack) 39:55; J. Chu (N. Darwitz, E. Lawler) 40:45; H. Knight (M. Engstrom) 44:27; J. Chu (N. Darwitz, L. Chesson) 58:51	Referee: (Germany) N. Hertrich

5 April 2009; 15:00	Russia	3–1 (0–0, 0–0, 3–1)	Japan	Arena 1, Hämeenlinna

Game reference
	Referee: (Canada) M. A. Gage
T. Burina (M. Sergina) 40:31 (PP1); A. Shchukina (O. Permyakova) 48:06 (SH1); O. Sosina (T. Sotnikova, K. Petrovskaya) 58:10 / Goals / Sakagami T. (Hirano Y., Adachi Y.) 49:23 (PP1)	Referee: (Canada) M. A. Gage

6 April 2009; 12:00	United States	8–0 (1–0, 5–0, 2–0)	Russia	Arena 1, Hämeenlinna; Attendance: 1629

Game reference
	Referee: (Finland) U. Sipilä
M. Duggan (C. Cahow, L. Chesson) 7:16; J. Potter (H. Knight) 31:41 (SH1); A. Ruggiero (M. Schaus) 32:12 (SH1); K. Stack (M. Lamoureux, J. Chu) 37:32 (PP1); L. Chesson (E. Lawler) 38:09; J. Chu (N. Darwitz, C. Cahow) 38:22; G. Marvin (C. Cahow, N. Darwitz) 47:25 (PP1); J. Chu (N. Darwitz, M. Lamoureux) 52:39 / Goals	Referee: (Finland) U. Sipilä

==== Group B ====
Pos	Team	Pld	W	OTW	OTL	L	GF	GA	GD	Pts	Qualification
1	Canada	2	2	0	0	0	20	1	+19	6	Group D
2	Sweden	2	1	0	0	1	6	8	−2	3	Group E
3	China	2	0	0	0	2	2	19	−17	0	Group F

Source: IIHF

4 April 2009; 15:00	China	1–13 (1–5, 0–4, 0–4)	Canada	Arena 1, Hämeenlinna; Attendance: 625

Game reference
	Referee: (Finland) U. Sipilä
Sun R. (Jin F., Zhang S.) 14:06 (PP) / Goals / C. MacLeod (C. Sostorics, G. Apps) 3:43; C. Ouellette (G. Kingsbury, J. Botterill) 3:53; S. Vaillancourt (C. Ouellette, J. Botterill) 4:29; M. P. Poulin (M. Mikkelson, M. Agosta) 6:31 (PP1); M. Agosta (S. Vaillancourt, H. Irwin) 14:21; R. Johnston (H. Irwin) 26:35; H. Wickenheiser (C. Ward, C. Ouellette) 36:24 (PP1); H. Irwin (R. Johnston) 37:11; R. Johnston T. Bonhomme, H. Irwin) 38:48; G. Apps (H. Wickenheiser, S. Vaillancourt) 40:23; H. Wickenheiser (S. Vaillancourt) 45:54; G. Apps (C. MacLeod, H. Wickenheiser) 55:58; S. Vaillancourt (H. Wickenheiser) 58:56	Referee: (Finland) U. Sipilä

5 April 2009; 19:00	Sweden	6–1 (2–0, 3–0, 1–1)	China	Arena 1, Hämeenlinna; Attendance: 1,737

Game reference
	Referee: (Russia) A. Ustinova
D. Rundqvist 6:15; E. Holmlöv (E. Eliasson) 19:50; E. Holmlöv (D. Rundqvist, P. Winberg) 23:50 (PP1); E. Holst (E. Nordin, E. Holmlöv) 30:37 (PP1); K. Timglas (I. Jordansson) 38:45; E. Holst (P. Winberg) 45:49 / Goals / Qi X. 55:04 (PP2)	Referee: (Russia) A. Ustinova

6 April 2009; 15:30	Canada	7–0 (2–0, 1–0, 4–0)	Sweden	Arena 1, Hämeenlinna; Attendance: 1403

Game reference
	Referee: (United Kingdom) J. Tottman
C. Ouellette (J. Hefford, J. Botterill) 2:22; C. MacLeod (R. Johnston, M. Mikkelson) 10:53; C. Sostorics (C. MacLeod, T. Bonhomme) 32:26 (PP1); M. Poulin (C. Ward, M. Agosta) 41:38; H. Wickenheiser (C. MacLeod) 43:14 (SH1); R. Johnston (G. Kingsbury, C. MacLeod) 47:22; J. Botterill (J. Hefford, C. MacLeod) 59:24 / Goals	Referee: (United Kingdom) J. Tottman

==== Group C ====
Pos	Team	Pld	W	OTW	OTL	L	GF	GA	GD	Pts	Qualification
1	Finland	2	2	0	0	0	13	3	+10	6	Group D
2	Kazakhstan	2	0	1	0	1	2	8	−6	2	Group E
3	Switzerland	2	0	0	1	1	4	8	−4	1	Group F

Source: IIHF

4 April 2009; 19:00	Kazakhstan	0–7 (0–2, 0–3, 0–2)	Finland	Arena 1, Hämeenlinna; Attendance: 3,241

Game reference
	Referee: (United States) L. Wrazidlo
Goals / M. Karvinen (K. Rantamaki, J. Hiirikoski) 2:14; A. Helin (Saa. Tuominen, M. Pehkonen) 14:17 (PP1); M. Pehkonen (A. Helin, Saa. Tuominen) 21:22; N. Tikkinen (M. Saarinen, V. Heikkilä) 21:41; M. Karvinen (M. Voutilainen, K. Rantamaki) 30:28; M. Pehkonen (Sat. Tuominen) 42:37; M. Voutilainen (M. Karvinen, K. Rantamaki) 58:22	Referee: (United States) L. Wrazidlo

5 April 2009; 17:00	Switzerland	1–2 (SO) (0–0, 0–1, 1–0) (0–0, 0–1)	Kazakhstan	Arena 2, Hämeenlinna; Attendance: 215

Game reference
	Referee: (Norway) A. Høve
K. Lehmann (C. Meier) 54:50 (PP1) / Goals / N. Yakovchuk (T. Koroleva) 37:19; A. Fux 65:00 (GWS)	Referee: (Norway) A. Høve

6 April 2009; 19:00	Finland	6–3 (4–1, 1–0, 1–2)	Switzerland	Arena 1, Hämeenlinna; Attendance: 3201

Game reference
	Referee: (Russia) A. Ustinova
H. Pelttari (Saa. Tuominen) 5:47; V. Heikkilä (Saa. Tuominen) 10:31; M. Karvinen (J. Hiirikoski) 15:02 (PP1); J. Hiirikoski (M. Karvinen) 18:17 (PP1); N. Tikkinen (V. Heikkilä) 37:52 (SH1); N. Tikkinen (Saa. Tuominen, H. Pelttari) 52:17 / Goals / D. Leimgruber 19:27; N. Bullo (K. Nabholz) 44:26; C. Meier 54:00	Referee: (Russia) A. Ustinova

=== Qualifying round ===
All times are local (Eastern European Summer Time – UTC+3).

==== Group D (1st–3rd place) ====
Pos	Team	Pld	W	OTW	OTL	L	GF	GA	GD	Pts	Qualification
1	Canada	2	2	0	0	0	10	1	+9	6	Final
2	United States	2	1	0	0	1	8	2	+6	3	Final
3	Finland	2	0	0	0	2	0	15	−15	0	3rd place match

Source: IIHF

8 April 2009; 19:00	Canada	8–0 (2–0, 2–0, 4–0)	Finland	Arena 1, Hämeenlinna; Attendance: 2032

Game reference
	Referee: (United States) L. Wrazidlo
G. Kingsbury (M. P. Poulin, C. MacLeod) 4:43; J. Botterill (C. Ouellette 6:39; S. Vaillancourt (M. Mikkelson, M. P. Poulin) 22:10 (PP1); M. Agosta (J. Hefford, C. Ouellette) 35:10; J. Botterill (C. Ward) 41:17 (PP1); H. Wickenheiser (T. Bonhomme, S. Vaillancourt) 49:22; J. Hefford (C. Ward, H. Wickenheiser) 51:57 (PP1); H. Haley (M. P. Poulin) 57:06 / Goals	Referee: (United States) L. Wrazidlo

9 April 2009; 19:00	Finland	0–7 (0–2, 0–3, 0–2)	United States	Arena 1, Hämeenlinna; Attendance: 2038

Game reference
	Referee: (Canada) M. A. Gage
Goals / H. Knight (K. Bellamy, M. Lemoureux) 9:21; G. Marvin 15:33 (SH1); N. Darwitz (E. Lawler, J. Chu) 32:36; N. Darwitz (C. Cahow, J. Chu) 36:01 (PP2); H. Knight (A. Ruggiero) 39:11; N. Darwitz (E. Lawler, J. Chu) 51:32; H. Knight (J. Potter) 55:26 (PP1)	Referee: (Canada) M. A. Gage

10 April 2009; 19:00	United States	1–2 (0–0, 0–2, 1–0)	Canada	Arena 1, Hämeenlinna

Game reference
	Referee: (Germany) N. Hertrich
M. Lamoureux (J. Lamoureux) 58:02 / Goals / J. Botterill (J. Hefford) 20:26 (PP1); C. Ouellette (J. Hefford) 29:05	Referee: (Germany) N. Hertrich

==== Group E (4th–6th place) ====
Pos	Team	Pld	W	OTW	OTL	L	GF	GA	GD	Pts	Qualification
1	Sweden	2	2	0	0	0	17	0	+17	6	3rd place match
2	Russia	2	1	0	0	1	9	10	−1	3	
3	Kazakhstan	2	0	0	0	2	2	18	−16	0	

Source: IIHF

8 April 2009; 15:00	Sweden	9–0 (2–0, 3–0, 4–0)	Kazakhstan	Arena 1, Hämeenlinna; Attendance: 2058

Game reference
	Referee: (Norway) A. Høve
T. Enström (F. Nevalainen) 2:07; E. Holmlöv (P. Winberg) 19:16 (PP1); E. Holmlöv (P. Winberg, E. Holst) 27:00; F. Svedin Thunström (I. Jordansson, E. Udén Johansson) 35:28; M. Rooth (G. Andersson) 36:15; D. Rundqvist (T. Enström, E. Eliasson 56:38 (PP1); E. Holst (K. Timglas, P. Winberg) 57:17; E. Udén Johansson (F. Nevalainen, E. Holst) 57:41; E. Holmlöv (G. Andersson, E. Holst) 58:40 (PP1) / Goals	Referee: (Norway) A. Høve

9 April 2009; 15:00	Kazakhstan	2–9 (1–3, 0–3, 1–3)	Russia	Arena 1, Hämeenlinna; Attendance: 374

Game reference
	Referee: (United Kingdom) J. Tottman
L. Ibragimova (A. Fux, G. Shu) 15:52 (PP1); N. Yakovchuk (A. Fux) 53:08 / Goals / E. Smolentseva 3:56; A. Kapustina (E. Smolentseva, A. Khomich) 8:29; I. Dyubanok 11:20; S. Terentieva (T. Sotnikova, E. Lebedeva) 23:06; E. Smolentseva (I. Gavrilova) 27:02; T. Burina (E. Smolentseva, I. Gavrilova) 39:47; Y. Ananina (E. Smolentseva) 44:35; I. Gavrilova (Y. Ananina, E. Smolentseva) 55:08; T. Burina (A. Vafina, O. Permyakova) 58:52 (PP1)	Referee: (United Kingdom) J. Tottman

10 April 2009; 15:00	Russia	0–8 (0–1, 0–4, 0–3)	Sweden	Arena 1, Hämeenlinna; Attendance: 425

Game reference
	Referee: (Canada) M. A. Gage
Goals / T. Enström (G. Andersson) 15:21; F. Nevalainen (F. Svedin Thunström, E. Holst) 31:32 (PP1); M. Rooth (C. Östberg) 34:26; E. Holst (P. Winberg, E. Holmlöv) 35:26; E. Holmlöv (E. Holst) 36:35 (SH1); P. Winberg (F. Nevalainen) 44:15; K. Myrén (T. Enström, C. Östberg) 50:15 (PP1); D. Rundqvist 57:54	Referee: (Canada) M. A. Gage

=== Relegation round ===
All times are local (Eastern European Summer Time – UTC+3).

==== Group F (7th–9th place) ====
Pos	Team	Pld	W	OTW	OTL	L	GF	GA	GD	Pts	Relegation
1	Switzerland	2	1	1	0	0	8	6	+2	5	
2	Japan	2	1	0	0	1	4	4	0	3	Relegated to the 2011 Division I
3	China	2	0	0	1	1	5	7	−2	1	Relegated to the 2011 Division I

Source: IIHF

8 April 2009; 17:00	China	4–5 (SO) (2–1, 2–0, 0–3) (0–0, 0–1)	Switzerland	Arena 2, Hämeenlinna; Attendance: 379

Game reference
	Referee: (Finland) U. Sipilä
Sun R. 1:57; Sun R. 3:54; Sun R. 24:46 (SH1); Jiang N. (Sun R.) 26:26 / Goals / C. Meier (S. Benz, K. Lehmann) 17:11 (PP1); D. Leimgruber (A. Stiefel) 43:50 (SH1); L. Nussbaum (C. Meier, K. Lehmann) 51:39 (PP1); D. Leimgruber (C. Meier) 55:55; N. Bullo 65:00 (GWS)	Referee: (Finland) U. Sipilä

9 April 2009; 17:00	Switzerland	3–2 (0–0, 2–1, 1–1)	Japan	Arena 2, Hämeenlinna; Attendance: 247

Game reference
	Referee: (Germany) N. Hertrich
L. Benz (A. Frautschi, D. Leimgruber) 23:02; K. Lehmann (S. Benz) 39:37 (PP1); L. Ruhnke (N. Bullo) 54:12 / Goals / Fujimoto N. (Hirano Y., Adachi Y.) 27:41; Yamanaka C. 51:22	Referee: (Germany) N. Hertrich

10 April 2009; 17:00	Japan	2–1 (0–0, 2–0, 0–1)	China	Arena 2, Hämeenlinna; Attendance: 256

Game reference
	Referee: (United Kingdom) J. Tottman
Sakagami T. (Nonaka E., Hirano Y.) 28:48; Sakagami T. (Hirano Y.) 34:34 / Goals / Sun R. (Wang L.) 42:00 (PP1)	Referee: (United Kingdom) J. Tottman

=== Final round ===
==== 3rd place match ====
12 April 2009; 15:00	Finland	4–1 (1–0, 1–1, 2–0)	Sweden	Arena 1, Hämeenlinna; Attendance: 3027

Game reference
	Referee: (United States) L. Wrazidlo
M. Karvinen (K. Rantamaki, E. Laaksonen) 12:36; M. Pehkonen (N. Tikkinen, S. Sirvio) 22:28 (PP1); M. Saarinen (A. Helin, E. Laaksonen) 43:34; M. Karvinen 48:02 / Goals / D. Rundqvist (E. Udén Johansson) 24:40	Referee: (United States) L. Wrazidlo

==== Final ====
12 April 2009; 19:00	Canada	1–4 (0–1, 1–1, 1–2)	United States	Arena 1, Hämeenlinna; Attendance: 3046

Game reference
	Referee: (Norway) A. Høve
J. Botterill (C. Ouellette, J. Hefford) 25:11 / Goals / C. Cahow (H. Knight, J. Potter) 0:24; M. Dugggan (J. Lamoureux) 30:10; C. Cahow (N. Darwitz, G. Marvin) 47:09 (PP1); H. Knight (J. Chu) 59:51 (ENG)	Referee: (Norway) A. Høve

=== Final standings ===
Rank	Team
1st place, gold medalist(s)	United States
2nd place, silver medalist(s)	Canada
3rd place, bronze medalist(s)	Finland
4	Sweden
5	Russia
6	Kazakhstan
7	Switzerland
8	Japan
9	China

Relegated to the 2011 Division I

2009 IIHF Women's World champions

United States
Third title

=== Awards and statistics ===
==== Scoring leaders ====
Pos	Player	Country	GP	G	A	Pts	+/−	PIM
1	Julie Chu	United States	5	5	5	10	+8	0
2	Natalie Darwitz	United States	5	3	7	10	+8	2
3	Hilary Knight	United States	5	7	2	9	+5	4
4	Erika Holst	Sweden	5	4	5	9	+5	4
5	Elin Holmlöv	Sweden	5	6	2	8	+5	2
6	Jennifer Botterill	Canada	5	5	3	8	+5	2
7	Hayley Wickenheiser	Canada	5	4	4	8	+6	4
8	Caroline Ouellette	Canada	5	3	5	8	+7	6
9	Carla MacLeod	Canada	5	2	6	8	+9	4
10	Michelle Karvinen	Finland	5	5	2	7	+3	6

GP = Games played; G = Goals; A = Assists; Pts = Points; +/− = P Plus–minus; PIM = Penalties In Minutes

Source: IIHF.com

==== Goaltending leaders ====
(minimum 40% team's total ice time)

Pos	Player	Country	TOI	GA	GAA	Sv%	SO
1	Kim St-Pierre	Canada	120:00	0	0.00	100.00	2
2	Jessie Vetter	United States	120:00	1	0.50	98.21	1
3	Valentina Lizana	Sweden	240:00	5	1.25	93.33	2
4	Azusa Nakaoku	Japan	208:10	11	3.17	92.47	0
5	Charline Labonté	Canada	179:04	5	1.68	91.23	2

TOI = Time on ice (minutes:seconds); GA = Goals against; GAA = Goals against average; Sv% = Save percentage; SO = Shutouts Source: IIHF.com

==== Directorate Awards ====
- Goaltender: Charline Labonté, Canada
- Defenseman: Jenni Hiirikoski, Finland
- Forward: Hayley Wickenheiser, Canada

Source: IIHF.com

==== Media All-Stars ====
- Goaltender: Jessie Vetter, United States
- Defensemen: Angela Ruggiero, United States; Carla MacLeod, Canada
- Forwards: Julie Chu, United States; Michelle Karvinen, Finland; Natalie Darwitz, United States
- MVP: Carla MacLeod, Canada

== Division I ==
The Division I tournament was played in Graz, Austria, from 4 to 10 April 2009.

Pos	Team	Pld	W	OTW	OTL	L	GF	GA	GD	Pts	Promotion or relegation
1	Slovakia	5	4	0	0	1	22	14	+8	12	Promoted to the 2011 Top Division
2	Germany	5	4	0	0	1	20	13	+7	12	
3	Norway	5	2	1	0	2	18	18	0	8	
4	Austria	5	2	0	1	2	16	16	0	7	
5	Czech Republic	5	2	0	0	3	17	18	−1	6	Relegated to the 2011 Division II
6	France	5	0	0	0	5	10	24	−14	0	Relegated to the 2011 Division II

Source: IIHF

All times are local (Central European Summer Time – UTC+2).

4 April 2009; 13:30	Slovakia	9–4 (2–0, 1–2, 6–2)	Norway	Eishalle Liebenau

Game reference

4 April 2009; 17:00	Germany	5–3 (2–2, 2–1, 1–0)	France	Eishalle Liebenau

Game reference

4 April 2009; 20:30	Czech Republic	1–4 (1–0, 0–2, 0–2)	Austria	Eishalle Liebenau

Game reference

6 April 2009; 13:30	Germany	4–3 (3–1, 1–0, 0–2)	Norway	Eishalle Liebenau

Game reference

6 April 2009; 17:00	Slovakia	1–5 (1–1, 0–2, 0–2)	Czech Republic	Eishalle Liebenau

Game reference

6 April 2009; 20:30	Austria	5–2 (3–0, 1–2, 1–0)	France	Eishalle Liebenau

Game reference

7 April 2009; 13:30	Czech Republic	2–4 (1–2, 0–1, 1–1)	Germany	Eishalle Liebenau

Game reference

7 April 2009; 17:00	France	0–4 (0–1, 0–2, 0–1)	Norway	Eishalle Liebenau

Game reference

7 April 2009; 20:30	Slovakia	5–3 (2–2, 2–0, 1–1)	Austria	Eishalle Liebenau

Game reference

9 April 2009; 13:30	Czech Republic	5–4 (3–1, 1–2, 1–1)	France	Eishalle Liebenau

Game reference

9 April 2009; 17:00	Germany	1–2 (0–0, 0–2, 1–0)	Slovakia	Eishalle Liebenau

Game reference

9 April 2009; 20:30	Norway	2–1 (GWS) (1–0, 0–0, 0–1) (0–0, 1–0)	Austria	Eishalle Liebenau

Game reference

10 April 2009; 13:30	France	1–5 (0–0, 1–1, 0–4)	Slovakia	Eishalle Liebenau

Game reference

10 April 2009; 17:00	Norway	5–4 (1–2, 1–0, 3–2)	Czech Republic	Eishalle Liebenau

Game reference

10 April 2009; 20:30	Austria	3–6 (2–1, 1–3, 0–2)	Germany	Eishalle Liebenau

Game reference

=== Awards and statistics ===
==== Scoring leaders ====
Pos	Player	Country	GP	G	A	Pts	+/−	PIM
1	Line Øien	Norway	5	6	5	11	+5	2
2	Maritta Becker	Germany	4	3	6	9	+7	6
3	Petra Jurčová	Slovakia	5	7	1	8	+5	8
4	Denise Altmann	Austria	5	3	5	8	+3	4
4	Petra Pravlíková	Slovakia	5	3	5	8	+5	8
6	Eva-Maria Schwärzler	Austria	5	5	2	7	+3	4
7	Kateřina Mrázová	Czech Republic	5	4	3	7	0	0
8	Christina Fellner	Germany	5	3	4	7	+6	10
9	Marion Allemoz	France	5	1	6	7	–8	0
10	Martina Veličková	Slovakia	5	4	2	6	+7	4

GP = Games played; G = Goals; A = Assists; Pts = Points; +/− = P Plus–minus; PIM = Penalties In Minutes

Source: IIHF.com

==== Goaltending leaders ====
(minimum 40% team's total ice time)

Pos	Player	Country	TOI	GA	GAA	Sv%	SO
1	Christine Smestad	Norway	177:40	8	2.70	92.52	0
2	Sandra Borschke	Austria	125:00	4	1.92	92.45	0
3	Viona Harrer	Germany	180:12	7	2.33	92.22	0
4	Zuzana Tomčíková	Slovakia	300:00	14	2.80	91.76	0
5	Nina Geyer	Austria	179:43	11	3.67	91.20	0

TOI = Time on ice (minutes:seconds); GA = Goals against; GAA = Goals against average; Sv% = Save percentage; SO = Shutouts

Source: IIHF.com

==== Directorate Awards ====
- Goaltender: Zuzana Tomčíková, Slovakia
- Defenseman: Iveta Karafiátová, Slovakia
- Forward: Maritta Becker, Germany

Source: IIHF.com

== Division II ==
The Division II tournament was played in Torre Pellice, Italy, from 12 to 18 April 2009.

Pos	Team	Pld	W	OTW	OTL	L	GF	GA	GD	Pts	Promotion or relegation
1	Latvia	5	5	0	0	0	25	4	+21	15	Promoted to the 2011 Division I
2	North Korea	5	3	1	0	1	15	13	+2	11	
3	Great Britain	5	3	0	0	2	11	11	0	9	
4	Italy	5	1	1	0	3	15	18	−3	5	
5	Denmark	5	0	1	2	2	10	17	−7	4	
6	Netherlands	5	0	0	1	4	4	17	−13	1	Relegated to the 2011 Division III

Source: IIHF

All times are local (Central European Summer Time – UTC+2).

12 April 2009; 13:15	North Korea	1–6 (0–3, 1–1, 0–2)	Latvia	Torre Pellice Ice Rink

Game reference

12 April 2009; 16:45	Denmark	2–1 (GWS) (0–1, 1–0, 0–0) (0–0, 1–0)	Netherlands	Torre Pellice Ice Rink

Game reference

12 April 2009; 20:15	Great Britain	5–3 (3–1, 1–1, 1–1)	Italy	Torre Pellice Ice Rink

Game reference

13 April 2009; 13:15	Netherlands	0–2 (0–1, 0–0, 0–1)	Great Britain	Torre Pellice Ice Rink

Game reference

13 April 2009; 16:45	Denmark	3–4 (OT) (1–1, 2–2, 0–0) (0–1)	North Korea	Torre Pellice Ice Rink

Game reference

13 April 2009; 20:10	Latvia	5–1 (0–0, 3–0, 2–1)	Italy	Torre Pellice Ice Rink

Game reference

15 April 2009; 13:15	Latvia	5–0 (0–0, 3–0, 2–0)	Netherlands	Torre Pellice Ice Rink

Game reference

15 April 2009; 16:45	Denmark	1–3 (1–2, 0–1, 0–0)	Great Britain	Torre Pellice Ice Rink

Game reference

15 April 2009; 20:15	North Korea	4–2 (0–0, 1–2, 3–0)	Italy	Torre Pellice Ice Rink

Game reference

16 April 2009; 13:15	Netherlands	1–2 (0–1, 0–1, 1–0)	North Korea	Torre Pellice Ice Rink

Game reference

16 April 2009; 16:45	Great Britain	0–3 (0–0, 0–2, 0–1)	Latvia	Torre Pellice Ice Rink

Game reference

16 April 2009; 20:15	Italy	3–2 (GWS) (1–0, 0–1, 1–1) (0–0, 1–0)	Denmark	Torre Pellice Ice Rink

Game reference

18 April 2009; 13:15	North Korea	4–1 (2–0, 1–0, 1–1)	Great Britain	Torre Pellice Ice Rink

Game reference

18 April 2009; 16:45	Latvia	6–2 (0–0, 2–1, 4–1)	Denmark	Torre Pellice Ice Rink

Game reference

18 April 2009; 20:15	Italy	6–2 (2–1, 3–0, 1–1)	Netherlands	Torre Pellice Ice Rink

Game reference

=== Awards and statistics ===
==== Scoring leaders ====
Pos	Player	Country	GP	G	A	Pts	+/−	PIM
1	Iveta Koka	Latvia	5	6	14	20	+20	2
2	Inese Geca-Miljone	Latvia	5	8	7	15	+20	0
3	Ieva Petersone	Latvia	5	10	4	14	+17	8
4	Angela Taylor	Great Britain	5	6	0	6	+3	6
5	O Chol-ok	North Korea	5	5	0	5	0	2
6	Linda de Rocco	Italy	5	2	3	5	+2	12
7	Josefine Jakobsen	Denmark	5	4	0	4	+2	8
8	Ri Sol-gyong	North Korea	5	2	2	4	+2	8
9	Anna de la Forest de Divonne	Italy	5	3	0	3	–3	4
9	Sabrina Viel	Italy	5	3	0	3	–3	2

GP = Games played; G = Goals; A = Assists; Pts = Points; +/− = P Plus–minus; PIM = Penalties In Minutes

Source: IIHF.com

==== Goaltending leaders ====
(minimum 40% team's total ice time)

Pos	Player	Country	TOI	GA	GAA	Sv%	SO
1	Lolita Andrisevska	Latvia	240:00	2	0.50	98.44	2
2	Kelly Herring	Great Britain	239:23	7	1.75	93.91	1
3	Nanna Glaas	Denmark	250:59	11	2.63	90.43	0
4	Hong Kum-sil	North Korea	288:39	12	2.49	90.24	0
5	Claudia van Leeuwen	Netherlands	290:51	17	3.51	89.82	0

TOI = Time on ice (minutes:seconds); GA = Goals against; GAA = Goals against average; Sv% = Save percentage; SO = Shutouts

Source: IIHF.com

==== Directorate Awards ====
- Goaltender: Lolita Andrisevska, Latvia
- Defenseman: Linda de Rocco, Italy
- Forward: Iveta Koka, Latvia
- MVP : Iveta Koka

Source: IIHF.com

== Division III, Division IV and Division V ==
The Division III, Division IV and Division V were not played this year. The respective tournaments were cancelled. The reasons seem to be multiple. No country wanted to assume the financial costs of the tournaments. The tournaments will be scheduled for 2011. It has the effect the following changes:

- Iceland is not promoted to the Division III, but stay in the Division IV.
- Turkey is now relegated from Division IV to the new Division V.
- Division V will then consist of Turkey, and the four new nations who were to play in 2009: Bulgaria, Ireland, Poland and Spain.
