= 2003–04 Minnesota Duluth Bulldogs women's ice hockey season =

- Conference: WCHA

Record
- Overall: 20–12–2

Coaches and captains
- Head coach: Shannon Miller

== Regular season ==
=== Standings ===
2003–04 Western Collegiate Hockey Association standings
	Conference								Overall					
	GP	W	L	T	SOW	PTS	GF	GA	GP	W	L	T	GF	GA
Minnesota†*	24	19	3	2	–	40	95	40	36	30	4	2	161	60
Wisconsin	24	18	5	1	–	37	81	34	34	25	6	3	122	50
Minnesota Duluth	24	15	8	1	–	31	110	52	34	20	12	2	148	79
Minnesota State	24	9	11	4	–	22	45	62	34	16	14	4	75	81
Ohio State	24	10	12	2	–	22	51	69	35	16	16	3	83	90
St. Cloud State	24	4	19	1	–	9	53	107	32	7	24	1	74	137
Bemidji State	24	3	20	1	–	7	29	100	34	5	27	2	48	139
Championship: † indicates conference regular season champion; * indicates conference tournament champion Updated July 21, 2024

- Caroline Ouellette set an NCAA record for most shorthanded goals in one game with 2. This was accomplished on November 14, 2003 versus North Dakota.

== Player stats ==
Player	GP	G	A	Pts	GWG	PPG	SHG
Caroline Ouellette	32	29	47	76	1	10	4
Jenny Potter	34	36	39	75	10	7	4
Jessica Koizumi	30	21	10	31	4	5	0
Krista McArthur	32	4	22	26	0	3	0
Anna-Kaisa Piiroinen	11	0	0	0	0	0	0
Shannon Kasparek	7	0	0	0	0	0	0
Noemie Marin	28	15	5	20	2	4	0
Julianne Vasichek	34	7	13	20	2	3	0
Tricia Guest	30	7	10	17	0	2	0
Nora Tallus	31	3	13	16	1	2	1
Juliane Jubinville	32	5	8	13	0	0	0
Allison Lehrke	34	5	7	12	0	0	0
Larissa Luther	21	7	3	10	0	1	0
Suvi Vacker	34	2	6	8	0	0	0
Satu Kiipeli	32	2	3	5	0	0	0
Bethany Petersen	14	2	1	3	0	0	0
Meghan Stotts	29	1	2	3	0	0	0
Jill Sales	34	1	2	3	0	0	0
Julie Fearing	34	1	1	2	0	0	0
Riitta Schaublin	25	0	1	1	0	0	0
Becky Salyards	28	0	0	0	0	0	0
Anna-Kaisa Piiroinen	11	0	0	0	0	0	0
Shannon Kasparek	7	0	0	0	0	0	0

== Awards and honors ==
- January 28: Maria Rooth was given her first USCHO Offensive Player of the Week honor.
- February 5: Maria Rooth was named as a top 10 candidate for the Patty Kazmaier Award for the third consecutive season.
- March 7: Maria Rooth made the All-WCHA First Team
  - Erika Holst was the All-WCHA Second Team selection.
  - Five Bulldogs were honored with WCHA All-Academic honors: Laurie Alexander, Jessi Flink, Michelle McAteer, Tuula Puputti, Maria Rooth.
- March 9: Hanne Sikio, WCHA All Tournament Team forward.
- Jenny Potter, Runner-up, Patty Kazmaier Award
