= 2004–05 Minnesota Duluth Bulldogs women's ice hockey season =

NCAA Championships, Lost Regionals, 3–2 (OT) vs. St. Lawrence
- Conference: WCHA
- Home ice: Duluth Entertainment Convention Center

Record
- Overall: 26–6–2

Coaches and captains
- Head coach: Shannon Miller

== Regular season ==
=== Standings ===
2004–05 Western Collegiate Hockey Association standings
	Conference								Overall					
	GP	W	L	T	SOW	PTS	GF	GA	GP	W	L	T	GF	GA
Minnesota†*	28	25	1	2	–	52	129	26	40	36	2	2	197	54
Minnesota Duluth	28	22	4	2	–	46	110	41	34	26	6	2	131	54
Wisconsin	28	20	7	1	–	41	119	44	38	28	9	1	170	59
Ohio State	28	12	15	1	–	25	73	97	37	17	17	3	99	124
Minnesota State	28	8	17	3	–	19	47	85	35	9	20	6	54	101
St. Cloud State	28	7	18	3	–	17	47	105	35	9	22	4	63	124
North Dakota	28	6	21	1	–	13	52	125	35	9	23	3	74	143
Bemidji State	28	5	22	1	–	11	48	102	35	9	24	2	69	121
Championship: † indicates conference regular season champion; * indicates conference tournament champion Updated July 21, 2024

- In the 2004–05 season, Ouellette was a factor on more than 60 percent of goals scored by the Bulldogs. Among the top nine scorers on the Bulldogs, she had nine penalties, which were the fewest. Throughout her NCAA career, she never had double digits in penalties.
- November 9, 2004: Riitta Schaublin is named the USCHO.com Defensive Player of the Week. She stopped 63 of 67 shots in a two-game sweep of the Wisconsin Badgers.
- November 23, 2004: For the second time in the season, Riitta Schaublin is named USCHO.com Defensive Player of the Week. Against the Minnesota Golden Gophers, Schaublin recorded 62 saves.

== Player stats ==
= Indicates team leader

=== Skaters ===
Player	GP	G	A	Pts	GWG	PPG	SHG
Caroline Ouellette	33	32	48	80	9	11	3
Noemie Marin	29	30	26	56	3	16	2
Jessica Koizumi	32	24	17	41	4	8	0
Julianne Vasichek	34	3	27	30	1	1	0
Allison Lehrke	32	10	13	23	1	4	0
Nora Tallus	31	8	11	19	2	2	0
Juliane Jubinville	34	8	5	13	1	4	1
Rachael Drazan	34	5	6	11	1	1	1
Krista McArthur	15	1	10	11	0	1	0
Ashleigh Schols	31	1	8	9	1	1	0
Jill Sales	34	0	8	8	0	0	0
Suvi Vacker	26	0	8	8	0	0	0
Karine Demeule	15	4	3	7	2	1	0
Ashly Waggoner	34	0	7	7	0	0	0
Samantha Hough	32	3	2	5	0	1	0
Lisa Agozzino	32	1	0	1	1	0	0
Meghan Stotts	32	1	0	1	0	0	0
Patricia Elsmore	5	0	1	1	0	0	0
Rachael Bertram	6	0	1	1	0	0	0
Erin Holznagel	29	0	1	1	0	0	0
Becky Salyards	25	0	0	0	0	0	0
Riitta Schaublin	26	0	0	0	0	0	0
Julie Fearing	24	0	0	0	0	0	0
Anna-Kaisa Piiroinen	5	0	0	0	0	0	0

=== Goaltenders ===
Player	Games	Wins	Losses	Ties	Goals against	Minutes	GAA	Shutouts	Saves	Save %
Patricia Elsmore	5	3	1	0	4	263	0.9128	1	93	.959
Riitta Schaublin	26	20	4	1	39	1545	1.5147	7	638	.942
Anna-Kaisa Piiroinen	5	3	1	1	11	254	2.5952	0	82	.882

== Awards and honors ==
- November 9, 2004: Riitta Schaublin is named the USCHO.com Defensive Player of the Week
- November 23, 2004: Riitta Schaublin is named USCHO.com Defensive Player of the Week
- March 3, 2005: Caroline Ouellette is named UMD's first ever WCHA Student-Athlete of the Year, while also earning a spot on the All-WCHA First Team with Riitta Schaublin. Julianne Vasichek and Noemie Marin are named to the Second Team, and Rachael Drazan is an All-Rookie Team selection.
  - Ouellette, Marin, Schaublin, and Vasichek are joined by Jessica Koizumi, Jills Sales, Meghan Stotts, Nora Tallus, and Suvi Vacker on the All-Academic Team.
- March 6, 2005: Caroline Ouellette is named to the WCHA All-Tournament Team.
- March 14, 2005: Caroline Ouellette becomes the second Bulldog to be named a Patty Kazmaier Top-3 Finalist.
- March 23, 2005: Caroline Ouellette is honored with the USCHO.com Sportsmanship Award and Second Team selection, while Riitta Schaublin is named the sites Most Improved Player and a First Team selection. Julianne Vasichek is named to the Third Team, and Rachael Drazan is an All-Rookie Team pick.
- March 28, 2005: Caroline Ouellette is named a CCM All-America First Team selection for the second straight season. Julianne Vasichek is named to the second team, also for the second straight season.
