= 2007–08 Minnesota Duluth Bulldogs women's ice hockey season =

NCAA Frozen Four, Champions
- Conference: WCHA
- Home ice: Duluth Entertainment Convention Center

Record
- Overall: 34–4–1

Coaches and captains
- Head coach: Shannon Miller

The Bulldogs were WCHA regular season, WCHA playoff champions, and NCAA Frozen Four champions.

== Regular season ==
=== Standings ===
2007–08 Western Collegiate Hockey Association standings
	Conference								Overall					
	GP	W	L	T	SOW	PTS	GF	GA	GP	W	L	T	GF	GA
Minnesota Duluth†*	28	24	4	0	–	48	118	43	39	34	4	1	166	58
Minnesota	28	21	5	2	–	44	96	53	38	27	7	4	135	75
Wisconsin	28	20	5	3	–	43	94	36	41	29	9	3	142	58
St. Cloud State	28	11	13	4	–	26	54	78	38	18	15	5	86	102
Ohio State	28	11	14	3	–	25	81	94	37	17	17	3	108	115
Minnesota State	28	10	16	2	–	22	67	82	34	11	21	2	77	104
North Dakota	28	4	20	4	–	12	45	99	36	4	26	6	56	133
Bemidji State	28	1	25	2	–	4	24	94	36	4	29	3	38	115
Championship: † indicates conference regular season champion; * indicates conference tournament champion Updated July 21, 2024

=== Player stats ===
Player	GP	G	A	Pts	PIM	GWG	PPG	SHG
Haley Irwin	37	23	37	60	62	4	3	3
Laura Fridfinnson	39	22	22	44	22	3	8	2
Saara Tuominen	28	13	30	43	0	2	3	0
Elin Holmlov	36	20	21	41	24	2	7	1
Iya Gavrilova	26	19	22	41	43	7	5	0
Emmanuelle Blais	32	17	14	31	30	4	8	0
Myriam Trepanier	37	10	21	31	64	1	4	1
Heidi Pelttari	39	4	23	27	12	2	3	0
Jocelyne Larocque	39	4	22	26	60	2	1	0
Sara O'Toole	39	9	16	25	18	1	2	2
Karine Demeule	36	16	5	21	36	6	2	1
Jaime Rasmussen	39	2	11	13	0	0	1	0
Tawni Mattila	33	3	7	10	34	0	0	1
Tara Gray	39	1	9	10	26	0	0	0
Sarah Murray	39	1	3	4	24	0	0	0
Erin Olson	39	1	2	3	14	0	0	0
Kim Martin	36	0	2	2	6	0	0	0
Jessica Hawkins	39	1	0	1	12	0	0	0
Libby Guzzo	39	0	1	1	2	0	0	0
Johanna Ellison	15	0	0	0	0	0	0	0
Amie Meyer	8	0	0	0	0	0	0	0

== Postseason ==
=== NCAA Frozen Four ===
- March 15: The Bulldogs overcome three, one-goal deficits and defeat the Mercyhurst Lakers by a 5–4 score in the NCAA Quarterfinals.
- March 20: Kim Martin made 41 saves against New Hampshire as the Bulldogs advanced to the NCAA championship game. The Bulldogs won by a 3–2 score.
- March 22: The Bulldogs defeat Wisconsin 4–0 in Duluth to win their fourth NCAA title. It is only the second shutout in championship game history.
  - Sophomore netminder Kim Martin is named the 2008 NCAA Frozen Four's Most Outstanding Player after making 28 saves against the Badgers and 69 over the tournament.
  - 2008 Frozen Four All-Tournament team: Sara O’Toole, Laura Fridfinnson, Myriam Trepanier, Heidi Pelttari, Kim Martin.

== Awards and honors ==
- December 5: Freshman forward Iya Gavrilova and sophomore Kim Martin takes home USCHO.com Defensive Player of the Week honors, while Gavrilova picks up USCHO.com Offensive Player of the Week accolades.
- February 26, 2008: Sophomore goaltender Kim Martin is named a 2008 Patty Kazmaier Top-10 Finalist. She is the tenth Maroon and Gold player to be recognized as a top-10 finalist, and is the second netminder to land the honor.
- March 12: Kim Martin, Top Three finalist, Patty Kazmaier Award (Martin became the fifth top-three finalist from UMD to gain the honor)
- June 26: The Bulldogs make their fourth visit to the White House. The Bulldogs are honored in a Rose Garden ceremony with President George W. Bush.
- Haley Irwin is named the WCHA Rookie of the Year, only the second Bulldog ever to collect the honor.
- Haley Irwin, All-WCHA First Team
- Haley Irwin, All-WCHA Rookie Team
- Kim Martin, All-WCHA First Team
- Saara Tuominen, All-WCHA Third Team
- Jocelyne Larocque, All-WCHA Third Team.
- Jocelyne Larocque, All-WCHA Rookie Team.
