= Minnesota Duluth Bulldogs women's ice hockey =

American collegiate women's ice hockey program

- Current season
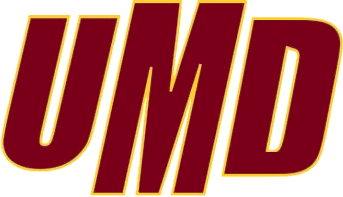
- University: University of Minnesota Duluth
- Conference: WCHA
- Head coach: Laura Schuler; 3rd season, 22–15–2
- Arena: AMSOIL Arena; Duluth, Minnesota
- Colors: Maroon and gold

NCAA tournament champions
- 2001, 2002, 2003, 2008, 2010

NCAA tournament runner-up
- 2007, 2022

NCAA tournament Frozen Four
- 2001, 2002, 2003, 2007, 2008, 2009, 2010, 2021, 2022

NCAA tournament appearances
- 2001, 2002, 2003, 2005, 2006, 2007, 2008, 2009, 2010, 2011, 2017, 2021, 2022, 2023, 2024, 2025, 2026

Conference tournament champions
- 2000, 2001, 2002, 2003, 2008, 2010

Conference regular season champions
- 2000, 2003, 2010

The Minnesota Duluth Bulldogs women's ice hockey is the team that plays for the University of Minnesota Duluth at the AMSOIL Arena in Duluth, Minnesota. The team is currently a member of the Western Collegiate Hockey Association (WCHA) and competes in the National Collegiate Athletic Association (NCAA) in the Division I tier. The Bulldogs have won five NCAA Championships, third most among all programs for women's ice hockey.

== History ==
On September 10, 1997, University of Minnesota Duluth Chancellor Kathryn A. Martin and Athletic Director Bob Corran announced that women's Division I hockey would be making its debut at UMD for the 1999–2000 season. On April 20, 1998, Shannon Miller, head coach of Team Canada at the 1998 Winter Olympics, was hired as the head coach.

On October 1, 1999, the Bulldogs played their first exhibition game in Salt Lake City, Utah, against the Olympic Oval Team from Calgary, Alberta. This game opened the new hockey facility for the 2002 Olympic Games.

The Bulldogs played the Wisconsin Badgers on October 8, 1999, in the first women's WCHA conference game at the Kohl Center in Madison, WI. It was the highest attended game of the season (3,892) and resulted in an 8–0 defeat of the Badgers. Forward Maria Rooth (Ängelholm, Sweden) was selected as Player of the Week in the WCHA on November 22, 1999, the first for UMD.

The Bulldogs season-starting winning streak of 12 games was snapped by Princeton University with a 2–2 tie in Princeton, NJ on December 10, 1999. UMD won the Lake Placid Tournament hosted by St. Lawrence University on January 22, 2000. Freshman goalie Tuula Puputti, freshman forward Hanne Sikio and junior defenseman Brittny Ralph were named to the All-Tournament Team. Sikio was also selected as the Tournament Most Valuable Player. The Minnesota Gophers hand the Bulldogs their first conference loss 4–3 in a sold-out game at Pioneer Hall (Duluth, MN) on February 11, 2000.

The Bulldogs clinched the women's WCHA regular season championship on February 26, 2000, with a sweep of Minnesota State-Mankato and earned the number one seed for the 2000 WCHA playoffs.

UMD took the inaugural NCAA Division I national championship on March 25, 2001, by defeating St. Lawrence University by a score of 4–2. This marked the first NCAA team championship for the Bulldogs. Maria Rooth was named Most Valuable Player of the tournament while her teammates Tuula Puputti and Brittny Ralph were named to the All-Tournament team. On June 25, 2001, the Bulldogs were honored at the White House by President George W. Bush, the first women's hockey team to be invited to the White House.

Five Bulldogs traveled to Salt Lake City to compete with their national teams at the 2002 Winter Olympics. From the 2001–2002 roster, forwards Maria Rooth and Erika Holst played for bronze medal winner Sweden while forward Hanne Sikio and goaltender Tuula Puputti skated for fourth-place Finland. Kristina Petrovskaia finished fifth with Team Russia. UMD also had two players in the Olympic final game, 2001–2002 newcomer and Olympic gold medalist Caroline Ouellette (Canada) and returning Bulldog and 2002 Olympic silver medalist Jenny Potter (USA).

The Bulldogs, 2002 NCAA national women's hockey champions, were recognized by the Minnesota Twins baseball team at the H.H.H. Metrodome in Minneapolis on May 6, 2002. Jenny Potter set an NCAA record (since tied) for most goals in one game with 6. This was accomplished on December 18, 2002, versus St. Cloud State. Ouellette set an NCAA record for most shorthanded goals in one game with 2. This was accomplished on November 14, 2003, versus North Dakota.

On March 22, 2010, Duluth Mayor Don Ness presented Shannon Miller with a proclamation declaring Friday, March 26, 2010, as "Shannon Miller Day."

On January 21, 2011, The top-ranked Badgers defeated the Bulldogs on the opening night of AMSOIL arena in front of 1,639 fans. The Badgers defeated the Bulldogs 4–1, extending their 11 game-winning streak, best in the NCAA. The Bulldogs still lead the all-time series 26–21–9. A ceremonial puck drop featured Bulldog legends Jenny Potter, Caroline Ouellette and Maria Rooth. In both games, the Bulldogs wore special edition black jerseys. The following day (January 22), for only the second time this season, the Bulldogs found themselves in a two-goal deficit after the first period of play. Despite trailing the No. 1 University of Wisconsin by two goals in each of the three periods, the Bulldogs scored three goals in the final 11 minutes of regulation to earn a 4–4 draw with the top-ranked Badgers in AMSOIL Arena.

=== Rivalries ===
Minnesota–Duluth, a traditional rival to the Minnesota Golden Gophers in men's hockey, would start its own rivalry in the women's game. The school gave a three-year, $210,000 contract to Shannon Miller, who coached Canada to the 1998 Olympic final in Nagano. Miller recruited players from Canada, Finland and Sweden, including four Olympians. The rivalry grew as Miller recruited a pair of players away from Minnesota: star forward Jenny Schmidgall, (whose 93 points in 1999–2000 would lead the nation), and defenseman Brittny Ralph, who would serve as the Bulldogs' first ever captain. In the first season, Duluth would lose just once to the Gophers in their first five meetings, which included a 2–0 Bulldogs victory in the final of the WCHA tournament.

=== Attendance ===
When the program still played at the DECC, despite the team's success, UMD women's hockey rarely drew a large crowd to its home ice. According to the website US College Hockey Online, the women's hockey team averaged 610 people out of an official 5233 seats, an 11.6% capacity. Even while winning five national titles, more than any other program at that time, the Bulldogs averaged sixth in attendance in women's Division I hockey. The men's team, however, averaged an attendance of 4253 per game having won one national title, an 86.2% capacity rating. They moved in with the men's team in 2010 to the new AMSOIL Arena.

== Season-by-season results ==
Note: GP = Games played, W = Wins, L = Losses, T = Ties

Won championship	Lost championship	Conference champions	League leader

Year	Coach	W	L	T	Conference	Conf. W	Conf. L	Conf. T	Finish	Conference Tournament	NCAA Tournament
1999–2000	Shannon Miller	25	5	3	WCHA	21	1	2	1st WCHA	Won Semifinals vs. Ohio State (7–1); Won Championship vs. Minnesota (2–0)	Lost First Round vs. Minnesota (2–3)
2000–01	Shannon Miller	28	5	4	WCHA	15	5	4	2nd WCHA	Won Quarterfinals vs. Minnesota State (10–1); Won Semifinals vs. Wisconsin (6–5); Won Championship vs. Ohio State (3–0)	Won Frozen Four vs. Harvard (6–3); Won Championship vs. St. Lawrence (4–2)
2001–02	Shannon Miller	24	6	4	WCHA	16	5	3	2nd WCHA	Lost Semifinals vs. Wisconsin (1–4)	Won Frozen Four vs. Niagara (3–2); Won Championship vs. Brown (3–2)
2002–03	Shannon Miller	31	3	2	WCHA	21	2	1	1st WCHA	Won Semifinals vs. Ohio State (6–1); Won Championship vs. Minnesota (5–3)	Won Frozen Four vs. Dartmouth (5–2); Won Championship vs. Harvard (4–3 2OT)
2003–04	Shannon Miller	20	12	2	WCHA	15	8	1	3rd WCHA	Won Semifinals vs. Wisconsin (3–1); Lost Championship vs. Minnesota (2–4)	Did not qualify
2004–05	Shannon Miller	26	6	2	WCHA	22	4	2	2nd WCHA	Won Quarterfinals vs. North Dakota (3–2 OT); Lost Semifinals vs. Wisconsin (2–3 OT)	Lost First Round vs. St. Lawrence (2–3 OT)
2005–06	Shannon Miller	22	9	3	WCHA	18	7	3	3rd WCHA	Won Quarterfinals vs. Bemidji State (7–2, 3–0); Lost Quarterfinals vs. Minnesota (1–2)	Lost First Round vs. St. Lawrence (0–1)
2006–07	Shannon Miller	24	11	4	WCHA	19	6	3	2nd WCHA	Won Quarterfinals vs. St. Cloud State (4–3, 1–3, 5–1); Lost Semifinals vs. Minnesota (2–3 OT)	Won First Round vs. Mercyhurst (3–2 OT); Won Frozen Four vs. Boston College (4–3 2OT); Lost Championship vs. Wisconsin (1–4)
2007–08	Shannon Miller	34	4	1	WCHA	24	4	0	1st WCHA	Won Quarterfinals vs. Bemidji State (6–0, 5–1); Won Semifinals vs. St. Cloud State (9–0); Won Championship vs. Wisconsin (5–4 OT)	Won First Round vs. Mercyhurst (5–4); Won Frozen Four vs. New Hampshire (3–2); Won Championship vs. Wisconsin (4–0)
2008–09	Shannon Miller	26	9	4	WCHA	18	6	4	3rd WCHA	Won Quarterfinals vs. North Dakota (7–0, 4–0); Lost Semifinals vs. Wisconsin (1–3)	Won Quarterfinals vs. New Hampshire (4–1); Lost Semifinals vs. Wisconsin (1–5)
2009–10	Shannon Miller	31	8	2	WCHA	20	6	2	1st WCHA	Won Quarterfinals vs. North Dakota (6–2, 4–1); Won Semifinals vs. Bemidji State (7–3); Won Championship vs. Minnesota (3–2)	Won Quarterfinals vs. New Hampshire (2–1); Won Semifinals vs. Minnesota (3–2); Won Championship vs. Cornell (3–2 3OT)
2010–11	Shannon Miller	22	9	3	WCHA	18	7	3	3rd WCHA	Won Quarterfinals vs. Minnesota State (3–0, 5–0); Lost Semifinals vs. Minnesota (2–4)	Lost Quarterfinals vs. Wisconsin (1–2)
2011–12	Shannon Miller	21	14	1	WCHA	15	12	1	4th WCHA	Won Quarterfinals vs. Ohio State (4–3, 3–2 OT); Won Semifinals vs. Wisconsin (3–1); Lost Championship vs. Minnesota (0–2)	Did not qualify
2012–13	Shannon Miller	14	16	4	WCHA	13	13	2	4th WCHA	Lost Quarterfinals vs. Ohio State (2–4, 0–3)	Did not qualify
2013–14	Shannon Miller	15	15	6	WCHA	11	11	6	4th WCHA	Won Quarterfinals vs. Ohio State (1–0, 2–3, 5–2); Lost Semifinals vs. Minnesota (1–4)	Did not qualify
2014–15	Shannon Miller	20	12	5	WCHA	14	10	4	4th WCHA	Lost Quarterfinals vs. Bemidji State (2–3, 2–0, 1–2 OT)	Did not qualify
2015–16	Maura Crowell	15	21	1	WCHA	10	17	1	6th WCHA	Won Quarterfinals vs. Bemidji State (5–1, 2–1 OT); Lost Semifinals vs. Wisconsin (0–5)	Did not qualify
2016–17	Maura Crowell	25	7	5	WCHA	19	5	4	3rd WCHA	Won Quarterfinals vs. St. Cloud State (5–0, 6–2); Won Semifinals vs. Minnesota (2–1 2OT); Lost Championship vs. Wisconsin (1–4)	Lost Quarterfinals vs. Minnesota (0–1)
2017–18	Maura Crowell	15	16	4	WCHA	10	11	3	4th WCHA	Lost Quarterfinals vs. Bemidji State (1–2, 4–1, 0–3)	Did not qualify
2018–19	Maura Crowell	15	16	4	WCHA	9	11	4	4th WCHA	Won Quarterfinals vs. Bemidji State (3–2, 4–3); Lost Semifinals vs. Minnesota (1–4)	Did not qualify
2019–20	Maura Crowell	18	12	6	WCHA	11	8	5	4th WCHA	Won Quarterfinals vs. Bemidji State (2–1 (OT), 1–2 (4OT), 4–1); Lost Semifinals vs. Wisconsin (1–4)	Did not qualify
2020–21	Maura Crowell	12	7	0	WCHA	11	5	0	2nd WCHA	Lost Semifinals vs. Ohio State (2–7)	Won Quarterfinals vs. Colgate (1–0 (OT)); Lost Semifinals vs Northeastern (2–3 (OT))
2021–22	Maura Crowell	27	12	1	WCHA	19	18	1	4th WCHA	Won Quarterfinals vs. Minnesota State (5–4, 1–3, 3–2 (OT)); Lost Semifinals vs. Minnesota (1–5)	Won First Round vs. Harvard (4–0); Won Quarterfinals vs. Minnesota (2–1); Won Semifinals vs. Northeastern (2–1 (2OT)); Lost Championship vs. Ohio State (2–3)
2022–23	Maura Crowell	26	10	3	WCHA	17	8	3	4th WCHA	Won Quarterfinals vs. St. Cloud State (1–0, 5–1); Lost Semifinals vs. Ohio State (1–2)	Won First Round vs. Clarkson (2–0); Lost Quarterfinals vs. Minnesota (0–3)
2023–24	Maura Crowell	21	14	4	WCHA	15	11	2	4th WCHA	Won Quarterfinals vs. St. Cloud State (5–0, 2–0); Lost Semifinals vs. Ohio State (0–5)	Won First Round vs. Connecticut (1–0 2OT); Lost Quarterfinals vs. Ohio State (0–9)
2024–25	Laura Schuler				WCHA					TBD	TBD

== Olympians ==
The UMD Bulldogs program has had more Winter Olympians than any other program in the history of NCAA Division I Women's Ice Hockey; 33 current or former Bulldogs have competed in the Olympic Women's ice hockey tournament.

- Jenny Schmidgall-Potter, 1998, 2002, 2006 and 2010 (A), United States
- Caroline Ouellette, 2002, 2006 and 2010 (A), Canada
- Tuula Puputti, 2002, Finland
- Hanne Sikiö, 2002, Finland
- Kristina Petrovskaia, 2002, 2006 and 2010, Russia
- Erika Holst, 2002, 2006 and 2010, Sweden
- Maria Rooth, 2002, 2006 and 2010, Sweden
- Satu Kiipeli, 2006, Finland
- Nora Tallus, 2006, Finland
- Jennifer Harß, 2006, Germany
- Iya Gavrilova, 2006, 2010 and 2014, Russia
- Haley Irwin, 2010, 2014 and 2018, Canada
- Heidi Pelttari, 2010, Finland
- Mariia Posa, 2010, Finland
- Saara Tuominen, 2010, Finland
- Jenni Asserholt, 2006 & 2010, Sweden
- Elin Holmlöv, 2010, Sweden
- Pernilla Winberg, 2010 and 2018, Sweden
- Kim Martin, 2010, Sweden
- Jocelyne Larocque, 2014 and 2018, Canada
- Eveliina Suonpää, 2014 and 2018, Finland
- Tea Villilä, 2014, Finland
- Maria Lindh, 2014 and 2018, Sweden
- Lara Stalder, 2014 and 2018, Switzerland
- Brigette Lacquette, 2018, Canada
- Sidney Morin, 2018, United States
- Maddie Rooney, 2018, United States

There are only two Bulldogs players who have won gold in the midst of their college eligibility: Haley Irwin with Team Canada in 2014 and Maddie Rooney with Team USA in 2018.

== Postseason history ==
- Won the first three NCAA Division I women's ice hockey national championships in 2001, 2002, and 2003.
- On March 18, 2007, the Bulldogs lost in the NCAA Frozen Four championship game to Wisconsin 4–1.
- The Bulldogs won their fourth national title in 2008 by defeating two-time defending champion Wisconsin 4–0 in Duluth. The victory capped a memorable season for UMD, which went 33–4–1 and also scored an overtime victory over Wisconsin to win the title of the WCHA Final Face-off, the league playoff championship.
- Won their fifth NCAA Division I women's ice hockey national championship in 2010.

== Team ==
=== 2026–27 roster ===
As of 14 November 2026

No.	Nat.	Player	Class	Pos	Height	DoB	Hometown	Previous team
1	(Canada)	Ève Gascon (A)	Senior	G	5' 8" (1.73 m)	2003-05-09	Mascouche, Quebec	Saint-Laurent Patriotes (QCHL)
2	(United States)	Rae Mayer	Sophomore	F	5' 8" (1.73 m)	2007-06-13	Chesapeake, Virginia	Bishop Kearney Selects (19U AAA)
3	(United States)	Lizzy Callahan	Freshman	F	5' 9" (1.75 m)	2008-06-30	Eden Prairie, Minnesota	Mound Westonka High School (MSHSL)
5	(United States)	Kate Kosobud (A)	Junior	D	5' 8" (1.73 m)	2006-06-12	Moorhead, Minnesota	Minnesota Golden Gophers (WCHA)
6	(Finland)	Tuuli Tallinen	Freshman	D	5' 10" (1.78 m)	2006-06-10	Kouvola, Finland	HPK (Auroraliiga)
7	(United States)	Brooke Gnetz	Freshman	D	5' 5" (1.65 m)	2008-01-25	Woodbury, Minnesota	Woodbury High School (MSHSL)
9	(United States)	Josie St. Martin	Junior	F	5' 4" (1.63 m)	2006-05-02	Stillwater, Minnesota	Ohio State Buckeyes (WCHA)
10	(Canada)	Ava MacLeod	Sophomore	F	5' 7" (1.7 m)	2007-09-29	Kelowna, British Columbia	RINK Academy Kelowna (CSSHL U18)
11	(Canada)	Caitlin Kraemer (C)	Junior	F	5' 9" (1.75 m)	2006-05-29	Waterloo, Ontario	Waterloo Ravens Elite (OWHL)
12	(United States)	Taylor Field	Freshman	F	5' 5" (1.65 m)	2008-03-13	Grand Forks, North Dakota	Shattuck-Saint Mary's (USHS)
13	(Canada)	Molly Cole	Sophomore	F	5' 7" (1.7 m)	2007-12-28	Langley, British Columbia	Delta Hockey Academy (CSSHL U18)
15	(Sweden)	Edit Danielsson	Freshman	F	5' 7" (1.7 m)	2007-09-13	Växjö, Sweden	Frölunda HC (SDHL)
16	(Finland)	Pauliina Salonen	Freshman	F	5' 3" (1.6 m)	2005-02-17	Turku, Finland	HIFK (Auroraliiga)
18	(Canada)	Madi Burr	Sophomore	F	5' 7" (1.7 m)	2007-05-31	Paris, Ontario	Stoney Creek Sabres (OWHL)
20	(United States)	Laini Gnetz	Freshman	D	5' 5" (1.65 m)	2008-01-25	Woodbury, Minnesota	Centennial High School (MSHSL)
21	(United States)	Zoey Krock	Junior	F	5' 4" (1.63 m)	2006-02-18	Pittsburgh, Pennsylvania	Pittsburgh Penguins Elite (19U AAA)
22	(Sweden)	Linnea Natt och Dag	Sophomore	D	5' 8" (1.73 m)	2006-04-25	Stockholm, Sweden	Djurgårdens IF (SDHL)
23	(Canada)	Ella Belfry	Senior	D	5' 6" (1.68 m)	2004-05-10	Ridgeway, Ontario	Boston University Terriers (HEA)
24	(Sweden)	Ida Karlsson (C)	Senior	D	5' 9" (1.75 m)	2004-06-30	Avesta, Sweden	Leksands IF (SDHL)
28	(Canada)	Renée Lapointe	Freshman	F	5' 7" (1.7 m)	2009-07-28	Barrie, Ontario	Durham West Jr. Lightning (OWHL)
33	(Canada)	Marilou Grenier	Freshman	G	5' 7" (1.7 m)	2007-01-17	Quebec City, Quebec	Cégep Limoilou Titans (QCHL)
35	(United States)	Saige Ruback	Freshman	G	5' 7" (1.7 m)	2008-04-00	DeKalb, Illinois	Team Illinois (19U AAA)

== Notable alumni ==
- Iya Gavrilova
- Jennifer Harß
- Kim Martin Hasson
- Haley Irwin
- Jocelyne Larocque
- Caroline Ouellette
- Mariia Posa
- Maria Rooth
- Jenny Schmidgall-Potter
- Eveliina Suonpää
- Nora Tallus
- Maddie Rooney
- Pernilla Winberg

== Awards and honors ==
- Ashton Bell, 2020–21 WCHA Defenseman of the Year
- Maria Rooth, Player of the Week in the WCHA on November 22, 1999
- Emma Soderberg, 2020–21 WCHA Goaltender of the Year
- Gabbie Hughes, Winner, 2023 Hockey Humanitarian Award
- Grace Sadura, Finalist, 2026 Hockey Humanitarian Award

=== All-Americans ===
- Emma Soderberg, 2020–21 Second Team CCM/AHCA All-American
- Ashton Bell, 2020–21 Second Team CCM/AHCA All-American, 2022–23 First Team CCM/AHCA All-American
- Lara Stalder, 2017, First Team All-American
- Sidney Morin, 2017, Second Team All-American
- Jocelyne Larocque, 2011 and 2009 First Team All-America selection
- Emmanuelle Blais, 2010, First Team All-American
- Kim Martin, 2008, First Team All-American
- Ritta Schaublin, 2006, First Team All-American
- Caroline Ouellette, 2005 and 2004, First Team All-American
- Julianne Vasichek, 2005 and 2004, Second Team All-American
- Jenny Potter, 2004, 2003 and 200, First Team All-American
- Maria Rooth, 2002 and 2001, First Team All-American; 2003, Second Team All-American

=== Division I Player of the Month ===
- Lara Stalder, Women's Hockey Commissioners' Association National Division I Player of the Month, January 2017

=== Frozen Four honors ===
- Jessica Koizumi, 2007 NCAA Frozen Four All-Tournament Team
- Emmanuelle Blais, 2010 NCAA Frozen Four All-Tournament Team
- Jessica Wong, 2010 NCAA Frozen Four All-Tournament Team
- Laura Fridfinnson, 2010 NCAA Frozen Four All-Tournament Team

=== Patty Kazmaier Award nominees ===
- Noemie Marin, Top 10 Finalist, 2006 Patty Kazmaier Award
- Noemie Marin, Top 10 Finalist for 2007 Patty Kazmaier Award
- Riitta Schaublin, Top 3 Finalist, 2006 Patty Kazmaier Award
- Emmanuelle Blais, 2010 Patty Kazmaier Award nominee
- Laura Fridfinnson, 2010 Patty Kazmaier Award nominee

=== Statistical leaders ===
- Caroline Ouellette, NCAA leader, 2003–04 season, Points per game, 2.38
- Caroline Ouellette, NCAA leader, 2003–04 season, Assists per game, 1.47
- Patricia Sautter, NCAA leader, 2001–02 season, Goalie winning percentage, .868

=== WCHA All-Star teams ===
- Brigette Lacquette, 2015 All-WCHA Second Team
- Zoe Hickel, 2015 All-WCHA Second Team
- Ashton Bell, 2020–21 WCHA First Team All-Star
- Emma Soderberg, 2020–21 WCHA First Team All-Star
- Gabbie Hughes, 2020–21 All-WCHA Second Team
- Anna Klein, 2020–21 All-WCHA Second Team

== Bulldogs in elite ice hockey ==
= CWHL All-Star	= PHF All-Star

Player	Position	Team(s)	League(s)	Clarkson Cup	Isobel Cup
Hanna Baskin	Defense	Toronto Sceptres	PWHL		
Ashton Bell	Defense	Ottawa Charge	PWHL		
Ashton Bell	Defense	Vancouver Goldeneyes	PWHL		
Emmanuelle Blais	Forward	Canadiennes de Montreal	CWHL	2 (2012, 2017)	
Ashleigh Brykaliuk	Forward	Vanke Rays	CWHL		
Ashleigh Brykaliuk	Forward	Minnesota Whitecaps	PHF		
Michela Cava	Forward	Toronto Furies	CWHL		
Michela Cava	Forward	Modo Hockey	SDHL		
Michela Cava	Forward	Brynäs IF	SDHL		
Michela Cava	Forward	Luleå HF	SDHL		
Michela Cava	Forward	KRS Vanke Rays	ZhHL		
Michela Cava	Forward	Toronto Six	PHF		
Michela Cava	Forward	Minnesota Frost	PWHL		
Michela Cava	Forward	Vancouver Goldeneyes	PWHL		
Michela Cava	Forward	Ottawa Charge	PWHL		
Alivia Del Basso	Forward	Melbourne Ice	AWIHL		
Alivia Del Basso	Forward	Perth Inferno	AWIHL		
Marie Delarbre	Forward	ECDC Memmingen	DFEL		
Marie Delarbre	Forward	ERC Ingolstadt	DFEL		
Marie Delarbre	Forward	Djurgårdens IF	SDHL		
Sydney Brodt	Forward	Minnesota	PWHPA		
Sydney Brodt	Forward	Linköping HC	SDHL		
Sydney Brodt	Forward	Minnesota Whitecaps	PHF		
Sydney Brodt	Forward	Minnesota Frost	PWHL		
Catherine Daoust	Defense	Canadiennes de Montreal	CWHL		
Catherine Daoust	Defense	Montreal	PWHPA		
Catherine Daoust	Defense	Montreal Force	PHF		
Maggie Flaherty	Defense	Minnesota Frost	PWHL		
Maggie Flaherty	Defense	Montreal Victoire	PWHL		
Iya Gavrilova	Forward	Calgary Inferno	CWHL	1 (2016)	
Iya Gavrilova	Forward	Tornado Dmitrov	RWHL		
Iya Gavrilova	Forward	Team Sonnet	PWHPA		
Élizabeth Giguère	Forward	Boston Pride	PHF		
Élizabeth Giguère	Forward	New York Sirens	PWHL		
Élizabeth Giguère	Forward	Minnesota Frost	PWHL		
Jessica Healey	Defense	HV71	SDHL		
Jessica Healey	Defense	Buffalo Beauts	PHF		
Jessica Healey	Defense	Boston Fleet	PWHL		
Zoe Hickel	Forward	Boston Pride	PHF		1 (2016)
Zoe Hickel	Forward	Connecticut Whale	PHF		
Zoe Hickel	Forward	Kunlun Red Star	CWHL		
Zoe Hickel	Forward	Calgary Inferno	CWHL	1 (2019) 1st Star of Game	
Zoe Hickel	Forward	Linköping HC	SDHL		
Gabbie Hughes	Forward	Ottawa Charge	PWHL		
Ryleigh Houston	Forward	Shenzhen KRS	ZhHL		
Haley Irwin	Forward	Montreal Stars	CWHL	1 (2016)	
Haley Irwin	Forward	Calgary Inferno	CWHL		
Nina Jobst-Smith	Defense	Vancouver Goldeneyes	PWHL		
Anna Klein	Forward	Minnesota Whitecaps	PHF		
Jessica Koizumi	Forward	Montreal Stars	CWHL		
Jessica Koizumi	Forward	Boston Blades	CWHL	2 (2013, 2015)	
Jessica Koizumi	Forward	Connecticut Whale	PHF		
Noémie Marin	Forward	Canadiennes de Montreal	CWHL	3 (2011, 2012, 2017)	
Mannon McMahon	Forward	Ottawa Charge	PWHL		
Mannon McMahon	Forward	Vancouver Goldeneyes	PWHL		
Sidney Morin	Defense	Boston Fleet	PWHL		
Sidney Morin	Defense	Minnesota Frost	PWHL		
Brigette Lacquette	Defense	Calgary Inferno	CWHL	2 (2016, 2019)	
Brigette Lacquette	Defense	Team Scotiabank	PWHPA		
Jocelyne Larocque	Defense	Markham Thunder	CWHL	1 (2018) Team captain	
Jocelyne Larocque	Defense	Team Adidas	PWHPA		
Jocelyne Larocque	Defense	Toronto Sceptres	PWHL		
Jocelyne Larocque	Defense	Ottawa Charge	PWHL		
Michelle Löwenhielm	Forward	Connecticut Whale	PHF		
Michelle Löwenhielm	Forward	HV71	SDHL		
Michelle Löwenhielm	Forward	SDE Hockey	SDHL		
Kim Martin Hasson	Goaltender	Tornado Dmitrov	RWHL		
Kim Martin Hasson	Goaltender	Linköping HC	SDHL		
Jenna McParland	Forward	Markham Thunder	CWHL	1 (2018)	
Jenna McParland	Forward	Toronto Six	PHF		
Olivia Mobley	Forward	Boston Fleet	PWHL		
Sidney Morin	Defense	Modo Hockey	SDHL		
Sidney Morin	Defense	Linköping HC	SDHL		
Sidney Morin	Defense	HV71	SDHL		
Sidney Morin	Defense	Lugano Ladies Team	SWHL A		
Sidney Morin	Defense	Minnesota Whitecaps	PHF		
Kateřina Mrázová	Forward	Boston Blades	CWHL		
Kateřina Mrázová	Forward	Connecticut Whale	PHF		
Kateřina Mrázová	Forward	Brynäs IF	SDHL		
Kateřina Mrázová	Forward	Ottawa Charge	PWHL		
Caroline Ouellette	Forward	Minnesota Whitecaps	WWHL		
Caroline Ouellette	Forward	Canadiennes de Montreal	CWHL	4 (2009, 2011, 2012, 2017)	
Anneke Rankila	Forward	Toronto Sceptres	PWHL		
Maddie Rooney	Goaltender	Team Adidas	PWHPA		
Maddie Rooney	Goaltender	Minnesota Frost	PWHL		
Jenny Schmidgall-Potter	Forward	Minnesota Whitecaps	WWHL		
Jenny Schmidgall-Potter	Forward	Boston Blades	CWHL	1 (2010)	
Emma Soderberg	Goaltender	Boston Fleet	PWHL		
Lara Stalder	Forward	Linköping HC	SDHL		
Lara Stalder	Forward	Brynäs IF	SDHL		
Emma Stauber	Defense	HV71	SDHL		
Emma Stauber	Defense	Minnesota Whitecaps	PHF		
Clara Van Wieren	Forward	Toronto Sceptres	PWHL		
Olivia Wallin	Forward	Ottawa Charge	PWHL		
Jessica Wong	Forward	Calgary Inferno	CWHL		
Jessica Wong	Forward	Kunlun Red Star WIH	CWHL		
Jessica Wong	Forward	KRS Vanke Rays	CWHL		
Jessica Wong	Forward	KRS Vanke Rays	ZhHL		

== Retired numbers ==
- Maria Rooth is one of two University of Minnesota Duluth female athletes in any sport to have her jersey number retired.

== See also ==
- Minnesota Duluth Bulldogs men's ice hockey
- List of college women's ice hockey coaches with 250 wins (Shannon Miller ranks twelfth on all-time list)
