= 2000–01 Minnesota Duluth Bulldogs women's ice hockey season =

NCAA Frozen Four, National Champions
- Conference: WCHA

Record
- Overall: 28–5–4

Coaches and captains
- Head coach: Shannon Miller
- Assistant coaches: Stacy Wilson

== Regular season ==
=== Standings ===
2000–01 Western Collegiate Hockey Association standings
	Conference								Overall					
	GP	W	L	T	SOW	PTS	GF	GA	GP	W	L	T	GF	GA
Minnesota†	24	18	4	2	–	38	114	49	34	23	9	2	135	75
Minnesota Duluth*	24	15	5	4	–	34	125	60	37	28	5	4	200	82
Wisconsin	24	13	6	5	–	31	100	64	35	21	9	5	145	94
St. Cloud State	24	12	10	2	–	26	92	94	35	17	16	2	131	133
Ohio State	24	11	10	3	–	25	76	65	37	18	16	3	119	96
Bemidji State	24	6	17	1	–	13	62	142	34	9	24	1	93	183
Minnesota State	24	0	23	1	–	1	18	113	35	2	31	2	32	147
Championship: † indicates conference regular season champion; * indicates conference tournament champion Updated July 17, 2024

== Player stats ==
Player	GP	G	A	Pts	GWG	PPG	SHG
Maria Rooth	32	41	31	72	4	7	1
Hanne Sikio	35	34	34	68	4	7	0
Erika Holst	32	25	27	52	6	9	0
Sanna Peura	30	17	22	39	1	7	0
Joanne Eustace	36	15	23	38	2	5	0
Satu Kiipeli	35	10	28	38	1	4	0
Brittny Ralph	37	10	21	31	1	3	0
Navada Russell	36	4	21	25	1	0	0
Pamela Pachal	35	7	17	24	2	2	0
Laurie Alexander	34	7	15	22	2	2	0
Michelle McAteer	36	5	10	15	0	1	0
Sheena Podovinnikoff	31	4	7	11	1	0	0
Jessi Flink	34	3	4	7	0	0	0
Tricia Guest	31	2	5	7	0	0	0
Jessica Smith	26	2	5	7	0	0	0
Leah Wrazidlo	22	3	3	6	1	0	0
Shannon Mikel	32	3	1	4	0	0	0
Jenni Venho	28	0	2	2	0	0	0
Kellie Frick	28	0	1	1	0	0	0
Alexa Gollinger	1	0	0	0	0	0	0
Riana Burke	9	0	0	0	0	0	0

== Postseason ==
UMD took the inaugural NCAA Division I National Championship on March 25, 2001 by defeating St. Lawrence University by a score of 4–2. This marked the first ever NCAA team championship for the Bulldogs.

== Awards and honors ==
- Maria Rooth was named Most Valuable Player of the NCAA tournament
- Tuula Puputti and Brittny Ralph were named to the all-tournament team.
- On June 25, 2001, the Bulldogs were honored at the White House by President George W. Bush. The Bulldogs were the first ever women's hockey team to be invited to the White House.
