= Maria Rooth =

Swedish ice hockey player

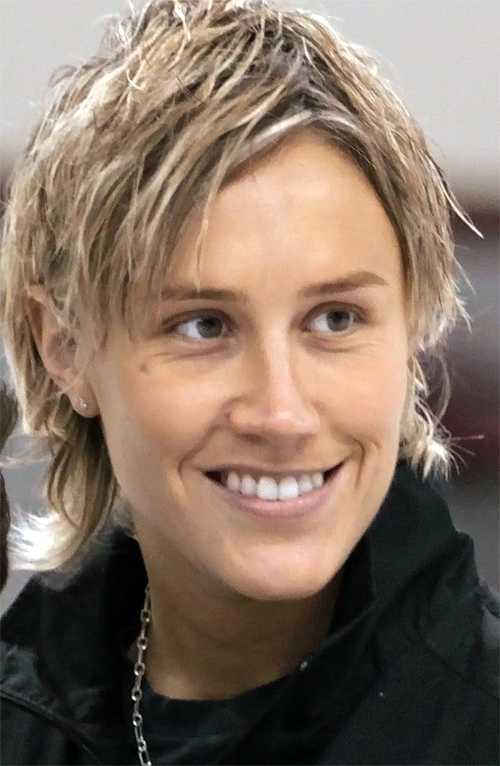
- Born: 2 November 1979 (age 47) Ängelholm, Sweden
- Height: 5 ft 9 in (175 cm)
- Weight: 159 lb (72 kg; 11 st 5 lb)
- Position: Forward
- Shot: Left
- Played for: Minnesota Duluth; Limhamn HK; MB Hockey; AIK
- National team: Sweden
- Playing career: 1996–2010
Medal record
Women's ice hockey
Representing Sweden
Olympic Games
Silver medal – second place	2006 Turin	Team
Bronze medal – third place	2002 Salt Lake City	Team
World Championships
Bronze medal – third place	2005 Sweden
Bronze medal – third place	2007 Canada

Maria Elisabeth Rooth (born 2 November 1979 in Ängelholm, Sweden) is a Swedish retired ice hockey player. She is the only University of Minnesota Duluth women's hockey player to have her jersey retired. Rooth was alternate captain and one of the most experienced players on the Swedish national team beginning in 1996.

In 2015, Rooth was inducted into the IIHF Hall of Fame.

== Playing career ==
=== NCAA ===
Rooth played collegiate hockey for the Minnesota Duluth Bulldogs women's ice hockey program. She is ranked second in all-time leading scoring in Bulldogs history and was named to the WCHA All-Decade team in 2009. She is the Bulldogs’ all-time leading goal scorer with 119 career goals and ranks second in career points with 232. She was a three-time All-American (2001, 2002, 2003) and a three-time First Team All-WCHA selection. She was the league's Rookie of the Year in 2000. During the 2000–01 season, she was named the Most Valuable Player of the Frozen Four and MVP of the WCHA Tournament. On 21 January 2011, Rooth, along with Bulldog alumni Caroline Ouellette and Jenny Potter, took part in a ceremonial faceoff to mark the first hockey game at Amsoil Arena.

=== International ===
Rooth is a four-time Team Sweden Olympian. She accumulated nine goals and nine assists in 20 games during her Olympic career and played more than 260 games for Team Sweden. At the 2009 IIHF World Championship, Rooth netted her 100th career international goal, a first for a Team Sweden player.

==== 2006 Winter Olympics ====
Rooth participated in the 2006 Turin Olympics. Alongside goaltender Kim Martin, she was instrumental in Sweden's upset against the United States in the semi-final game, ensuring Sweden at least a bronze medal and its first trip to the gold medal game. Rooth scored two goals in regulation time to tie the game and scored the clinching goal in the ensuing shootout. Overall at those Olympics, she scored five goals and four assists for a total of nine points, which ranked fourth, tied for highest non-Canadian player and highest among European players. She had a plus-minus of +1 and two penalty minutes. She was named one of the tournament's top forwards.

== Coaching ==
Rooth returned to Duluth as an assistant coach for the Minnesota Duluth Bulldogs women's ice hockey program during the 2010–11 season.

== Awards and honors ==
- WCHA Team of the Decade (2000s)
- Three-time Patty Kazmaier Top-10 Finalist in 2000, 2001 and 2002.
- Three-time WCHA All-Academic Team member in 2001, 2002 and 2003.
- University of Minnesota Duluth Athletic Hall of Fame, inducted in 2013.
- International Ice Hockey Federation Hall of Fame, inducted in 2015.
