= Caroline Ouellette =

Canadian ice hockey player

Caroline Ouellette OC OLY
- Hockey Hall of Fame, 2023
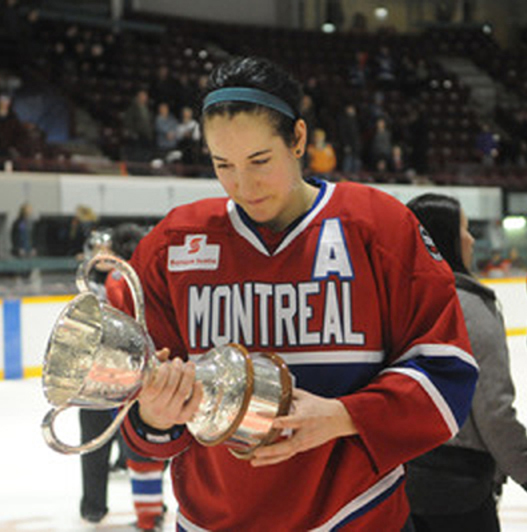
- Ouellette with the Montreal Stars in 2011
- Born: May 25, 1979 (age 47) Montreal, Quebec, Canada
- Height: 5 ft 11 in (180 cm)
- Weight: 172 lb (78 kg; 12 st 4 lb)
- Position: Forward
- Shot: Left
- Played for: Montreal Wingstar; Minnesota Whitecaps; Les Canadiennes de Montréal
- National team: Canada
- Playing career: 1999–2018
Medal record
Women's ice hockey
Representing Canada
Olympic Games
Gold medal – first place	2002 Salt Lake City	Team
Gold medal – first place	2006 Turin	Team
Gold medal – first place	2010 Vancouver	Team
Gold medal – first place	2014 Sochi	Team
IIHF World Women's Championships
Gold medal – first place	1999 Finland	Team
Gold medal – first place	2000 Canada	Team
Gold medal – first place	2001 United States	Team
Gold medal – first place	2004 Canada	Team
Gold medal – first place	2007 Canada	Team
Gold medal – first place	2012 United States	Team
Silver medal – second place	2005 Sweden	Team
Silver medal – second place	2008 China	Team
Silver medal – second place	2009 Finland	Team
Silver medal – second place	2011 Switzerland	Team
Silver medal – second place	2013 Canada	Team
Silver medal – second place	2015 Sweden	Team

Caroline Ouellette OC (WEL-let; born May 25, 1979) is a Canadian former ice hockey player and current assistant coach of the Montreal Victoire of the Professional Women's Hockey League. She was a member of the Canadian national women's ice hockey team and a member of Canadiennes de Montreal in the Canadian Women's Hockey League. Among her many accomplishments are four Olympic gold medals, 12 IIHF Women's World Championship medals (six gold, six silver), 12 Four Nations Cup medals (eight gold, four silver) and four Clarkson Cup championships.

Ouellette is in the Top 10 in all-time NCAA scoring with 229 career points. She is a member of the Triple Gold Club (not officially recognized by the IIHF for women) as one of only three women to win the Clarkson Cup, an Olympic gold medal and an IIHF Women's World Championship gold medal. Along with teammates Jayna Hefford and Hayley Wickenheiser, Ouellette is one of only five athletes to win gold in four consecutive Olympic games.

Retiring as an international player in 2018, she was inducted into both the IIHF Hall of Fame and the Hockey Hall of Fame in 2023.

== Playing career ==
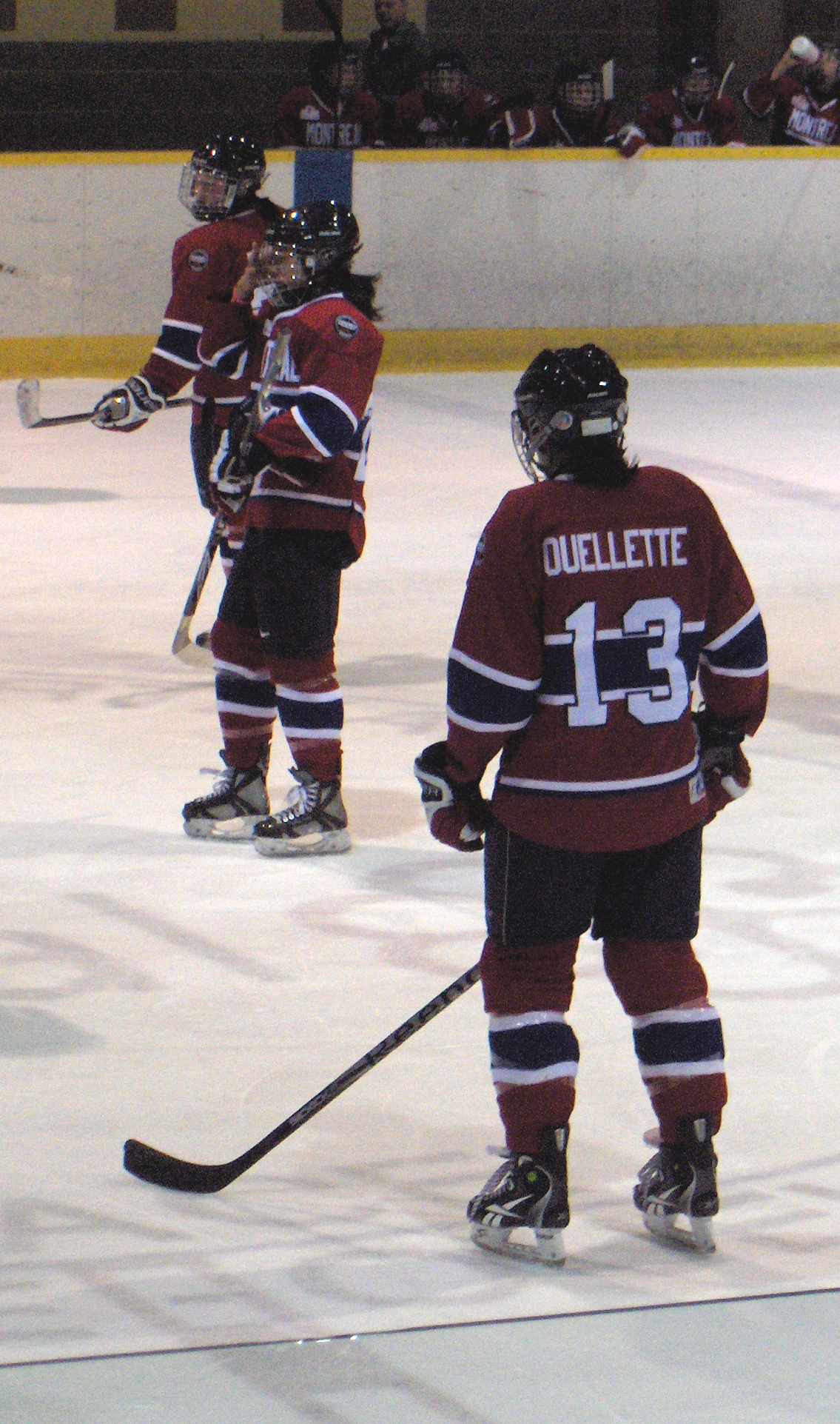

Ouellette played for Team Quebec at the 1995 Canada Winter Games, and won gold for Canada's Under 18 team in 1997. When the Canadian Under 19 women's hockey team was founded on May 15, 1996, Ouellette was one of the players named to the team. One of her teammates was future Olympic speed skater Cindy Klassen. The head coach was Daniele Sauvageau Ouellette represented Team Quebec at the 1998 Esso women's hockey nationals. She scored a goal and two assists in the bronze medal game, as Team Quebec was awarded the Maureen McTeer Trophy. During the 2011 IIHF Eight Nations Tournament, Ouellette assisted on all three goals as Canada defeated Finland by a 3–2 tally in round robin play. In the gold medal game of the 2011 Four Nations Cup, Ouellette notched a goal in a 4–3 loss. Ouellette has taken part in 3 Olympic Games, 9 World Championships and 9 Four Nations Cups. In 157 international games with Team Canada, Ouellette has racked up 169 points. In a game versus Russia at the 2012 IIHF Women's World Championship, Ouellette logged three assists in a 14–1 victory. Ouellette would score the game-winning goal in overtime versus the United States in the final game at the 2012 IIHF Women's World Championship, as Canada claimed the gold medal. She retired from Canada's national women's team on September 25, 2018.

=== NCAA ===
Ouellette attended the University of Minnesota Duluth and played for the Minnesota Duluth Bulldogs women's ice hockey program. Ouellette set an NCAA record for most shorthanded goals in one game with 2. This was accomplished on November 14, 2003, versus North Dakota. In the 2004–05 season, Ouellette was a factor on more than 60 percent of goals scored by the Bulldogs. Among the top nine scorers on the Bulldogs, she had nine penalties, which were the fewest. Throughout her NCAA career, she never had double digits in penalties. By season's end, she was one of three finalists for the Patty Kazmaier Award.

Ouellette is ranked third in all-time leading scoring in Bulldogs history and was named to the WCHA All-Decade team in 2009. She joined the national team in 1999 and has won four world championships (1999, 2000, 2001 and 2004) and four Olympic gold medals with the team (2002, 2006, 2010 and 2014).

=== CWHL ===
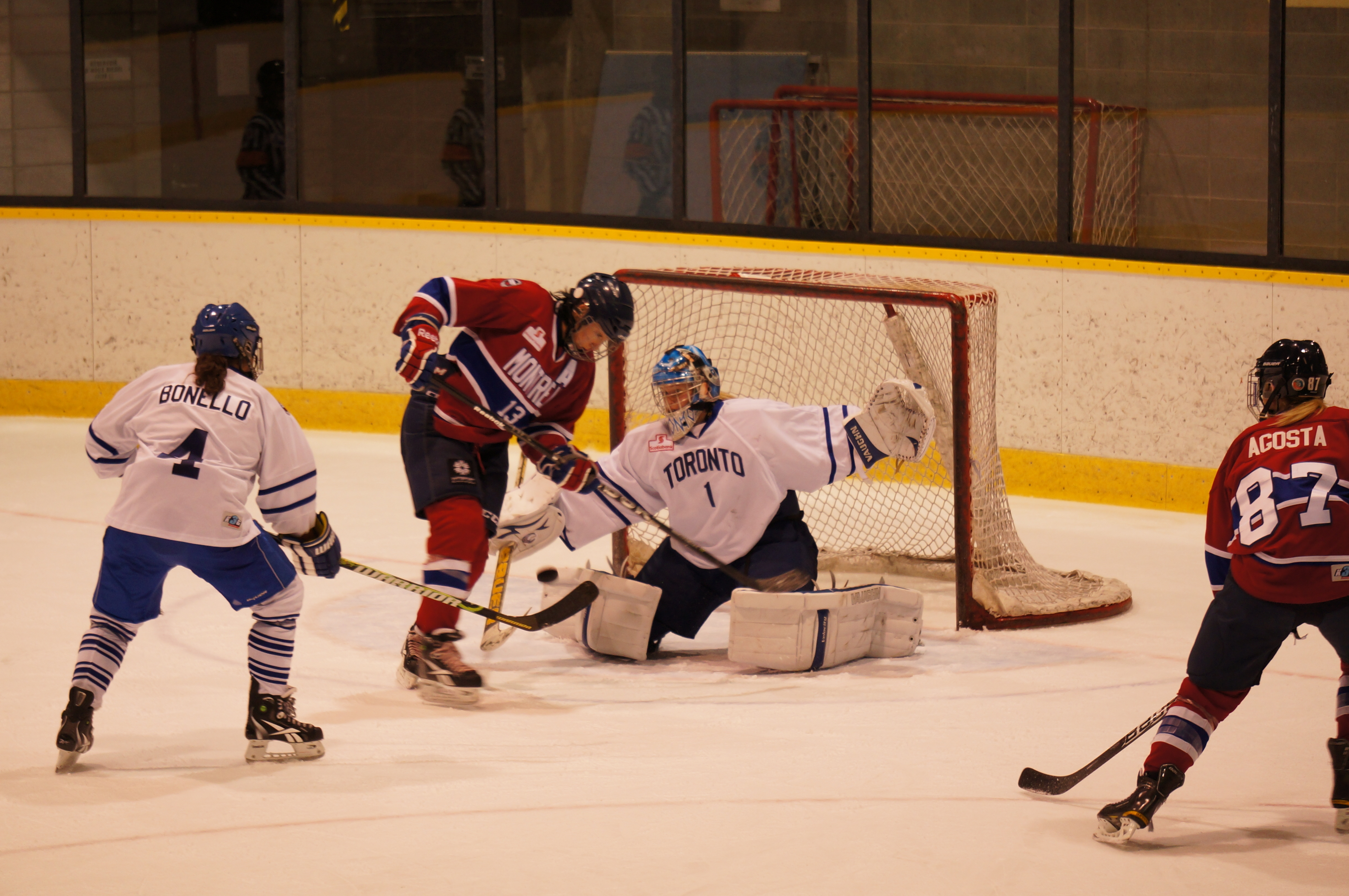
Ouellette, playing forward

During the 2000–01 NWHL season, Ouellette played with the Montreal Wingstar and finished third in league scoring with 53 points. She would also spend one season competing with the Minnesota Whitecaps in the former Western Women's Hockey League. In 2008–09, Ouellette joined the Montreal Stars. She won CWHL Top Scorer of the Month honours in November (tying the league record with 19 points in just six games) and December. At year's end, she was named CWHL Most Valuable Player. By winning a third gold medal in women's Olympic hockey, she became the Bulldog hockey player with the most gold medals.

By winning the 2009 Clarkson Cup, Ouellette became an unofficial member of the Triple Gold Club (the accomplishment by women is not yet officially recognized by the IIHF), as she became one of only three women (at the time) to win the Clarkson Cup, a gold medal in ice hockey at the 2002 Winter Olympics, and a gold medal at the IIHF World Women's Championships.

In 2010–11, Ouellette won the Angela James Bowl as the CWHL's scoring leader with 68 points. She also became the first two-winner of the league's Most Valuable Player award. In the championship game of the 2011 Clarkson Cup, Ouellette led all scorers with three points (one goal, two assists).

On December 11, 2016, Ouellette logged a pair of assists, eclipsing the 300-point mark. Of note, Ouellette became the first player in the history of the CWHL to reach this plateau.

== Coaching career ==
For the 2007–08 season, Ouellette was an assistant coach with the University of Minnesota Duluth women's hockey team along with Julie Chu. Ouellette was an assistant coach for the Canada women's national under-18 ice hockey team during a three-game series versus the United States in August 2008. She joined the coaching staff of the Concordia Stingers women's ice hockey program in the autumn of 2012. As of 2025, she became an assistant coach for the Montreal Victoire of the Professional Women's Hockey League.

== Personal life ==
Ouellette graduated from the University of Minnesota Duluth in 2005 with a degree in criminology and women's studies, and she graduated from the National Police Academy in Quebec in 2000. She played for Quebec in softball at the 1997 Summer Canada Games. On September 11, 2010, the Centre Etienne Desmarteau in Montreal, named one of the two rinks in the arena in Ouellette's honour. Caroline Ouellette is involved in raising funds for the Quebec Breast Cancer Foundation, a disease that has affected the Ouellette family. On January 21, 2011, Ouellette, along with University of Minnesota Duluth Bulldog alumni Jenny Potter and Maria Rooth, took part in a ceremonial faceoff to mark the first ever game at Amsoil Arena at her alma mater in Duluth.

She participated in various festivities commemorating the 2012 NHL All-Star Game in Ottawa, Ontario. Said festivities included an interview (along with a fan question and answer period) at the Sirius XM Stage at the Scotiabank NHL Fan Fair, the Energizer Night Skate at the Ottawa Rink of Dreams (relocated from the Rideau Canal), and attended the Molson Canadian NHL All-Star Skills Competition on Saturday, January 28, 2012. On April 17, 2012, Ouellette (along with Meghan Agosta, Gillian Apps, Courtney Birchard, and head coach Dan Church) took part in the opening faceoff of the playoff game between the Ottawa Senators and the New York Rangers at ScotiaBank Place.

Ouellette is married to American hockey player and Olympic silver-medalist Julie Chu. Ouellette and Chu announced the birth of their daughter Liv in November 2017. They welcomed their second child, Tessa, in May 2021.

== Career statistics ==
=== Regular season and playoffs ===
			Regular season					Playoffs
Season	Team	League	GP	G	A	Pts	PIM	GP	G	A	Pts	PIM
1998–99	Bonaventure Wingstar	NWHL	27	32	28	60	6	—	—	—	—	—
1999–00	Montreal Wingstar	NWHL	25	26	27	53	6	—	—	—	—	—
2000–01	Concordia University	RSEQ	7	12	7	19	0	—	—	—	—	—
2000–01	Montreal Wingstar	NWHL	29	21	34	55	22	—	—	—	—	—
2002–03	University of Minnesota Duluth	WCHA	32	31	42	73	16	—	—	—	—	—
2003–04	University of Minnesota Duluth	WCHA	32	29	47	76	16	—	—	—	—	—
2003–04	University of Minnesota Duluth	WCHA	33	32	48	80	18	—	—	—	—	—
2005–06	Montreal Axion	NWHL	—	—	—	—	—	2	0	3	3	0
2007–08	Minnesota Whitecaps	WWHL	9	7	9	16	0	1	1	3	4	0
2008–09	Montréal Stars	CWHL	24	25	33	58	6	—	—	—	—	—
2010–11	Montréal Stars	CWHL	29	22	46	68	16	4	1	5	6	4
2011–12	Montréal Stars	CWHL	27	30	36	66	12	4	5	3	8	2
2012–13	Montréal Stars	CWHL	23	13	13	26	14	4	1	1	2	6
2013–14	Montréal Stars	CWHL	2	2	0	2	4	3	0	3	3	2
2014–15	Montréal Stars	CWHL	22	8	18	26	18	3	1	2	3	0
2015–16	Les Canadiennes de Montréal	CWHL	24	15	17	32	18	3	4	6	10	0
2016–17	Les Canadiennes de Montréal	CWHL	22	15	16	31	4	—	—	—	—	—
2017–18	Les Canadiennes de Montréal	CWHL	6	1	4	5	2	2	0	0	0	0
WWHL/NWHL totals			90	86	98	184	34	3	1	6	7	0
CWHL totals			179	131	183	314	94	23	12	20	32	14

=== International ===
Year	Team	Event	Result	GP	G	A	Pts	PIM
1999	Canada	WC	1st place, gold medalist(s)	5	2	5	7	4
2000	Canada	WC	1st place, gold medalist(s)	5	0	2	2	2
2001	Canada	WC	1st place, gold medalist(s)	5	2	3	5	4
2002	Canada	OG	1st place, gold medalist(s)	5	2	4	6	6
2004	Canada	WC	1st place, gold medalist(s)	5	3	6	9	0
2005	Canada	WC	2nd place, silver medalist(s)	5	2	6	8	0
2006	Canada	OG	1st place, gold medalist(s)	5	5	4	9	4
2007	Canada	WC	1st place, gold medalist(s)	5	1	3	4	2
2008	Canada	WC	2nd place, silver medalist(s)	5	2	4	6	4
2009	Canada	WC	2nd place, silver medalist(s)	5	3	5	8	6
2010	Canada	OG	1st place, gold medalist(s)	5	2	9	11	2
2011	Canada	WC	2nd place, silver medalist(s)	5	1	2	3	2
2012	Canada	WC	1st place, gold medalist(s)	5	4	5	9	6
2013	Canada	WC	2nd place, silver medalist(s)	4	1	2	3	2
2014	Canada	OG	1st place, gold medalist(s)	5	0	0	0	2
2015	Canada	WC	2nd place, silver medalist(s)	5	2	2	4	2
WC Totals				59	23	45	68	34
OG Totals				20	11	19	30	14

== Awards and honours ==
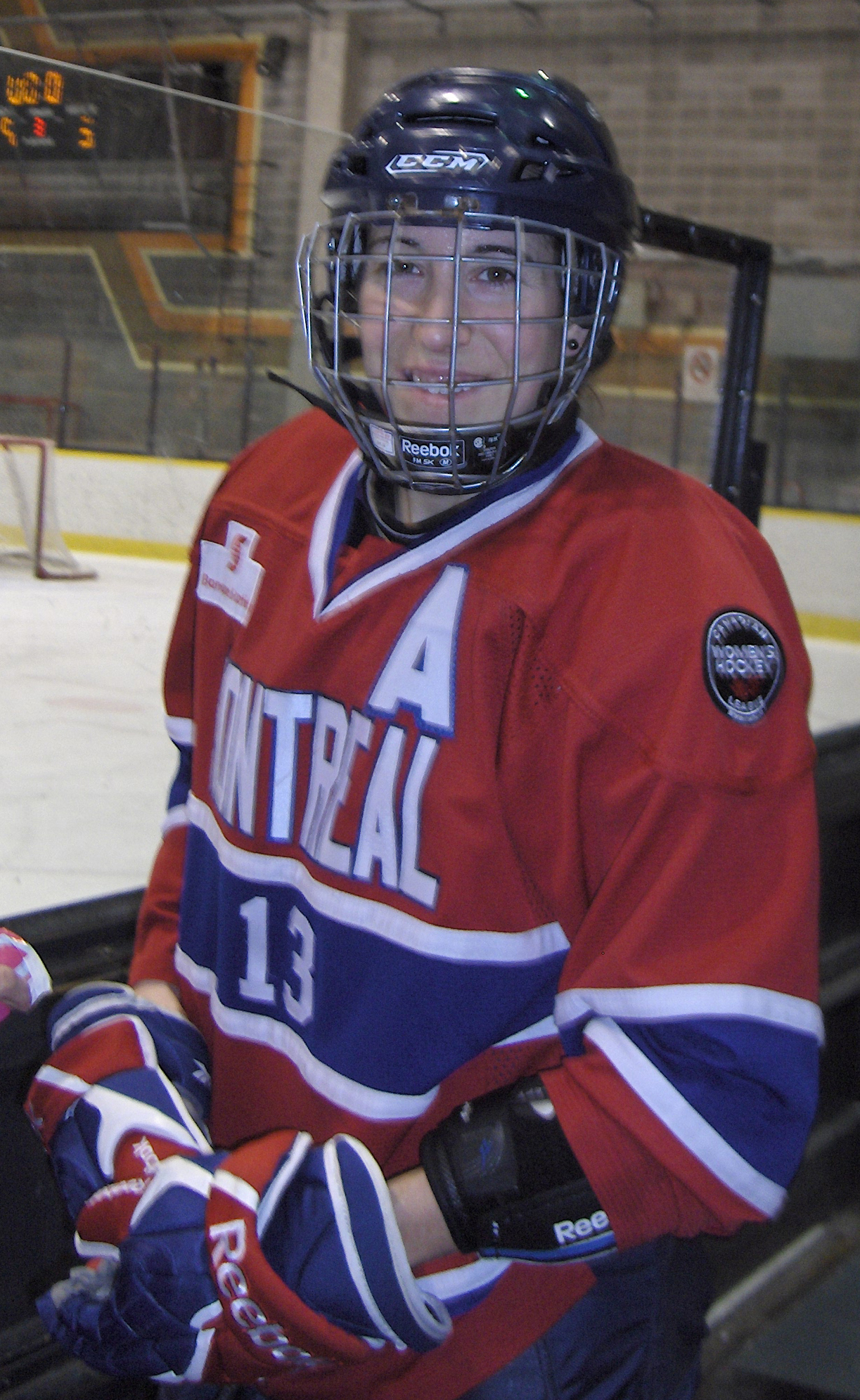
Ouellette playing for Montreal

- Isobel Gathorne-Hardy Award, 2013
- 2019 Hockey Canada Female Breakthrough Award
- In the 2019 Canadian honours, she was appointed as an Officer of the Order of Canada.
- In 2023, she was inducted into both the IIHF Hall of Fame and the Hockey Hall of Fame.

=== CWHL ===
- Clarkson Cup top forward, 2009
- Clarkson Cup top scorer, 2009
- CWHL most valuable player, 2008–09 and 2010–11
- CWHL first all-star team, 2008–09
- Angela James Bowl, 2010–11

=== NCAA ===
- Caroline Ouellette, 2003 NCAA Division I Women's Ice Hockey Tournament most valuable player
- Caroline Ouellette, NCAA leader, 2003–04 season, points per game, 2.38
- Caroline Ouellette, NCAA leader, 2003–04 season, assists per game, 1.47
- February 7, 2005: Caroline Ouellette became the third Minnesota Duluth player to be named a Patty Kazmaier Top-10 finalist for two consecutive seasons.
- March 3, 2005: Caroline Ouellette is named UMD's first WCHA student-athlete of the year, was named to the all-WCHA first team, and the WCHA all-academic team.
- March 6, 2005: Caroline Ouellette is named to the WCHA all-tournament team.
- March 14, 2005: Caroline Ouellette becomes the second Bulldog to be named a Patty Kazmaier top-3 finalist.
- March 23, 2005: Caroline Ouellette is honored with the USCHO.com Sportsmanship Award and a Second Team selection.
- March 28, 2005: Caroline Ouellette is named a CCM all-America first team selection for the second consecutive season.

Preceded by Sabrina Harbec (2010)	Angela James Bowl; 2011	Succeeded by Meghan Agosta (2012)
