= Saara Kivenmäki =

Finnish ice hockey player and coach (born 1986)

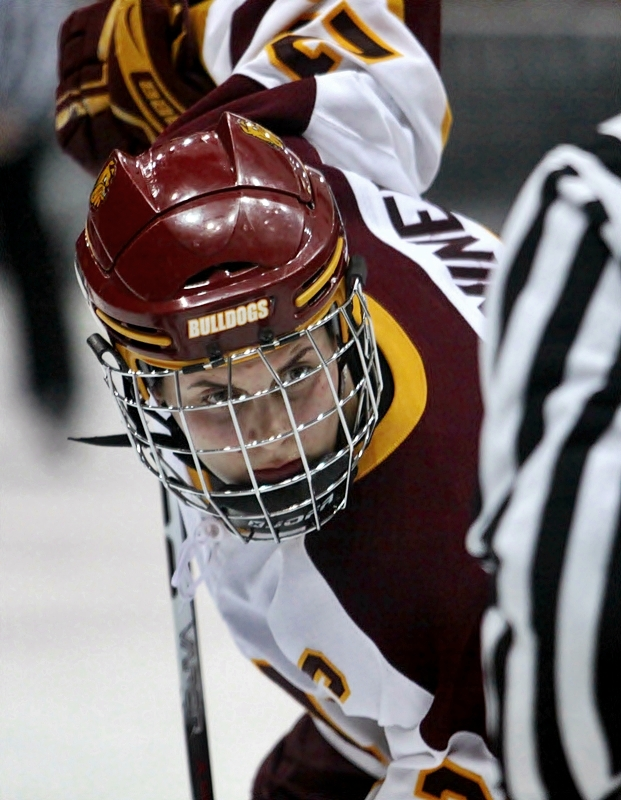
- Kivenmäki with the Minnesota Duluth Bulldogs in 2010
- Born: 1 January 1986 (age 40) Ylöjärvi, Finland
- Height: 1.68 m (5 ft 6 in)
- Weight: 65 kg (143 lb; 10 st 3 lb)
- Position: Forward
- Shot: Left
- Played for: IFK Helsinki; Ilves Tampere; Minnesota Whitecaps; Minnesota Duluth Bulldogs
- Current coach: IFK Helsinki; Swiss national team (Asst.)
- Coached for: Red Wings Helsinki; Shenzhen KRS (Asst.); Finnish national team (Asst.)
- National team: Finland
- Playing career: 2004–2019
- Coaching career: 2015–present
Medal record
Olympic Games
Bronze medal – third place	2010 Vancouver	Ice hockey
World Championship
Bronze medal – third place	2004 Canada
Bronze medal – third place	2008 China
Bronze medal – third place	2009 Finland
Universiade
Silver medal – second place	2011 Turkey	Ice hockey

Saara Elisa Kivenmäki (née Tuominen, previously Niemi; born 1 January 1986) is a Finnish ice hockey coach and former player. She has served as head coach of IFK Helsinki in the Auroraliiga since 2018, and as an assistant coach to the Swiss national team since 2026. Her playing career was highlighted by three IIHF Women's World Championship bronze medals and an Olympic bronze medal with the Finnish national team, a Finnish Championship title in the Naisten SM-liiga with Ilves, and two National Collegiate Championship titles with the Minnesota Duluth Bulldogs women's ice hockey program.

== Playing career ==
She graduated in 2010 from the University of Minnesota Duluth (UMD) and was a two-year captain of the Minnesota Duluth Bulldogs, the NCAA Division I national champions in 2008 and 2010. She was a 2009 and 2010 WCHA All-Academic Team member, a 2008 All-WCHA Third Team selection and a member of the 2007 All-WCHA Rookie Team.

After graduation, she joined the Minnesota Whitecaps for their 2010–11 season. On 8 October, against former WCHA rival Minnesota Golden Gophers, Tuominen scored a goal. The following day, against former WCHA rival St. Cloud State, she scored a goal.

Persistent knee problems led Kivenmäki to retire from playing at the age of 25.

=== International play ===
At the 2006 Torino Olympics, Tuominen competed for Finland. scoring one goal and four assists. She was an alternate captain for Finland's women's ice hockey team at the 2010 Winter Olympics in Vancouver where the Finns won the bronze medal.

== Career statistics ==
Event	Goals	Assists	Points	Shots	PIM	+/-
2010 Winter Olympics	0	1	1	1	12	−3

== Awards and honors ==
- 2006 Naisten SM-sarja Best Forward
- 2008 All-WCHA Third Team
- 2021 Naisten Liiga Coach of the Year
- 2023 Naisten Liiga Coach of the Year

== Gallery ==
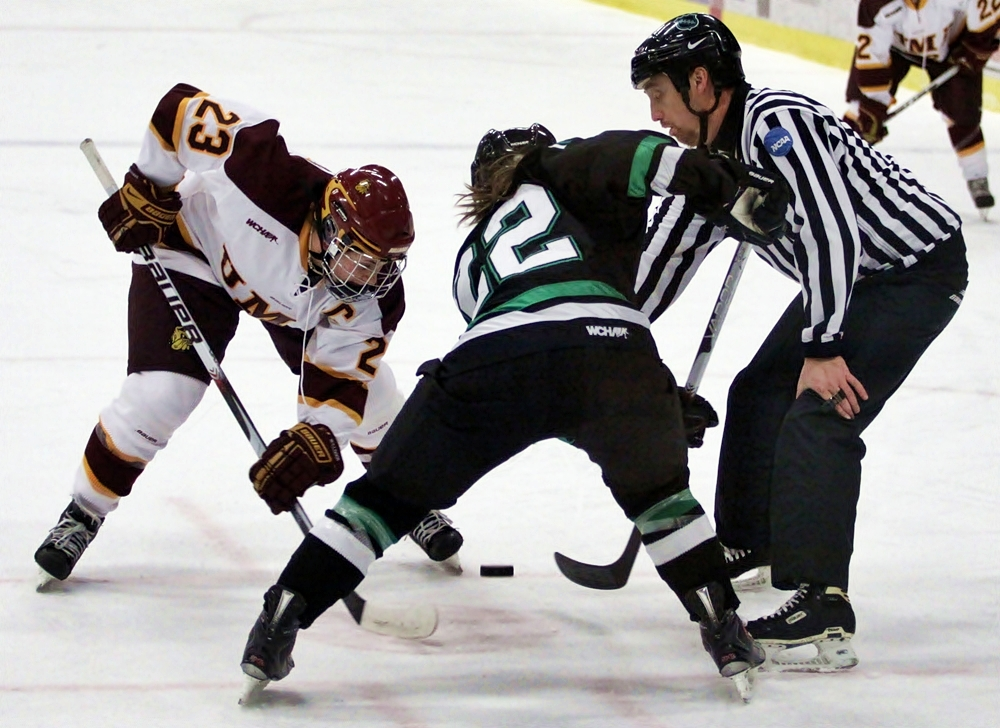
Saara Tuominen takes a face-off during a game against the University of New Hampshire at the DECC arena in Duluth, MN on Saturday, 13 March 2010.

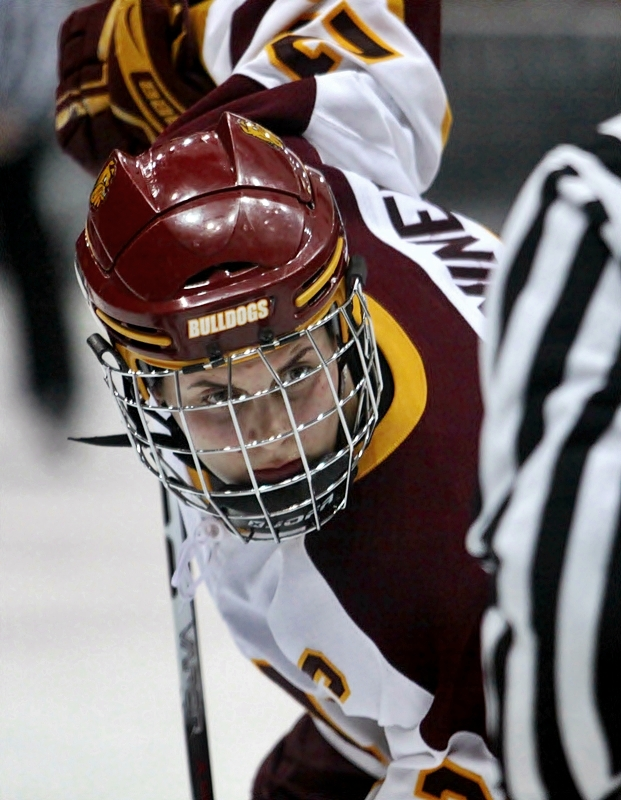
Saara Tuominen in a game against the University of New Hampshire at the DECC arena in Duluth, MN on Saturday, 13 March 2010.

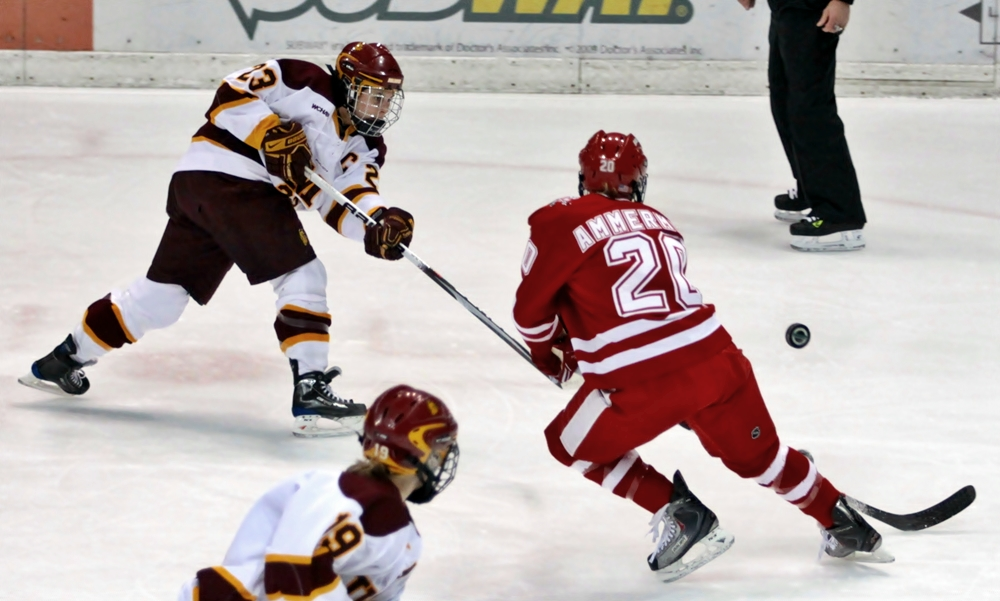
Saara Tuominen in a game against the University of Wisconsin Badgers at the DECC arena in Duluth, MN on Sunday, 17 January 2010.
