= Elin Holmlöv =

Swedish ice hockey player (born 1987)

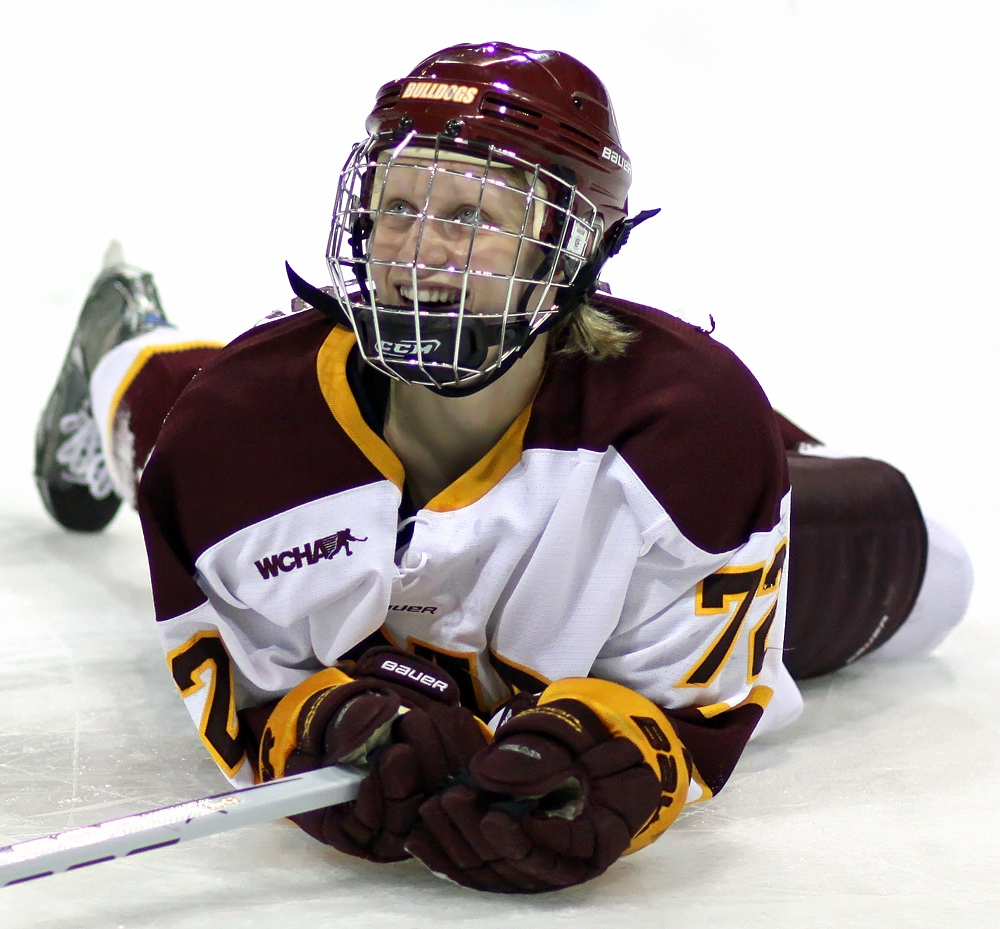
- Holmlöv with the UMD Bulldogs in February 2011
- Born: 5 August 1987 (age 39) Knivsta, Sweden
- Height: 173 cm (5 ft 8 in)
- Weight: 64 kg (141 lb; 10 st 1 lb)
- Position: Left wing
- Shot: Left
- Played for: AIK Hockey; Munksund-Skuthamns SK; Tornado Moscow; Minnesota Duluth Bulldogs; Segeltorps IF
- National team: Sweden
- Playing career: 2006–2015
Medal record
Women's ice hockey
Representing Sweden
World Championships
Bronze medal – third place	2005 Sweden
Bronze medal – third place	2007 Canada

Elin Anna Maria Holmlöv (born 5 August 1987) is a Swedish retired ice hockey player. She plays forward position for the Sweden women's national ice hockey team. She won the bronze medal at the 2007 Women's World Ice Hockey Championships in Winnipeg, Manitoba.

She played four years of college ice hockey with the Minnesota Duluth Bulldogs women's ice hockey program at the University of Minnesota Duluth.

In 2011–12, Holmlov played with Team Sweden teammates Kim Martin and Danijela Rundqvist for Moscow Tornado in the Russian Women's Hockey League.
