= Kim Martin Hasson =

Swedish ice hockey player

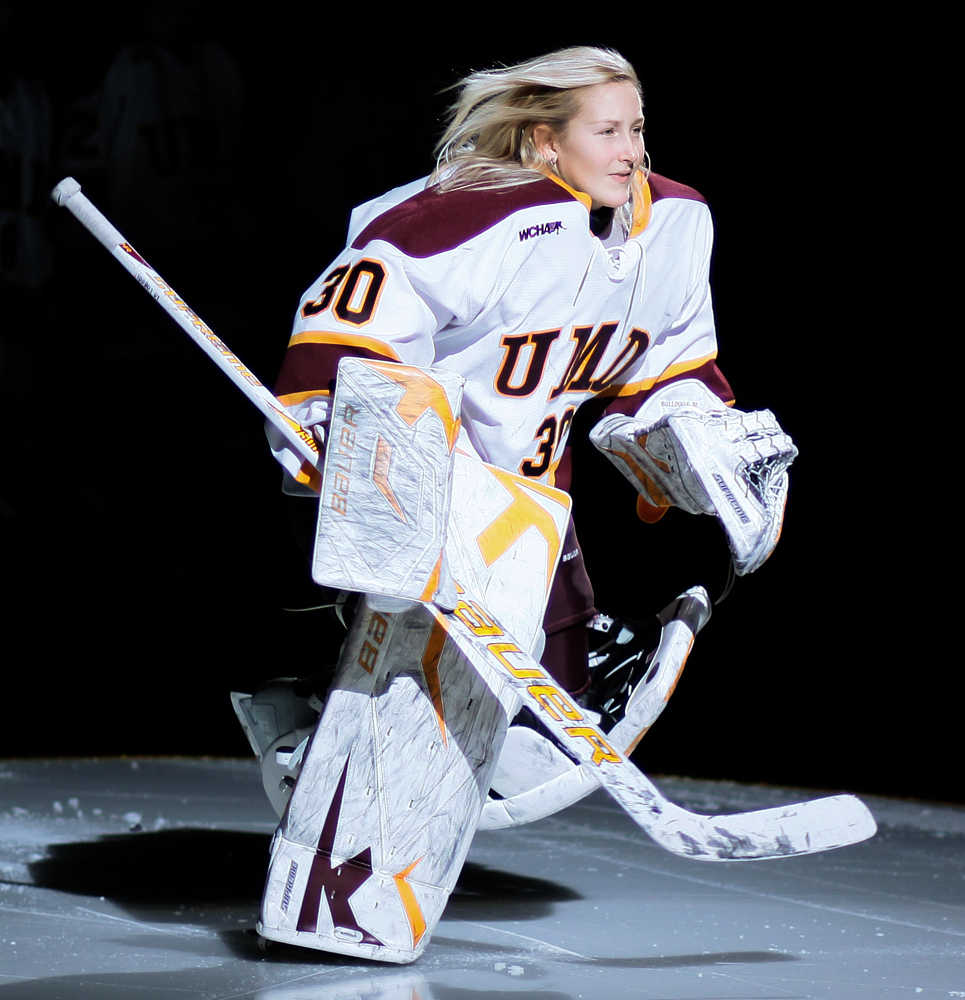
- Former UMD Bulldogs goaltender Kim Martin, February 2011
- Born: 28 February 1986 (age 40) Stockholm, Sweden
- Height: 1.66 m (5 ft 5 in)
- Weight: 71 kg (157 lb; 11 st 3 lb)
- Position: Goaltender
- Caught: Left
- Played for: AIK; Minnesota Duluth Bulldogs; Tornado Dmitrov; Linköping HC
- National team: Sweden
- Playing career: 2001–2015
Medal record
Women's ice hockey
Representing Sweden
Olympic Games
Silver medal – second place	2006 Turin	Team
Bronze medal – third place	2002 Salt Lake City	Team
World Championships
Bronze medal – third place	2005 Sweden
Bronze medal – third place	2007 Canada

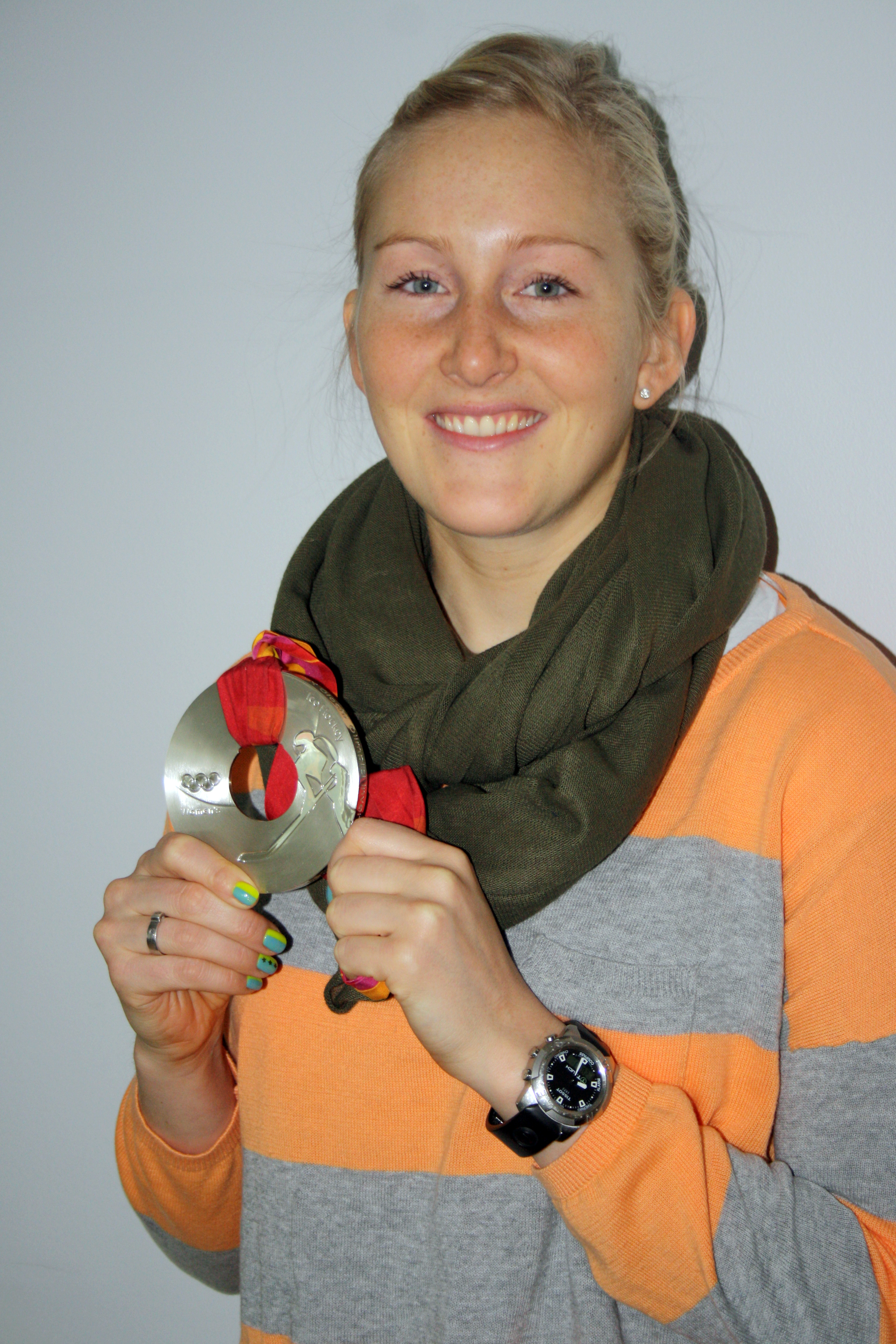
Kim Martin, March 2012

Kim Kristine Martin Hasson (born 28 February 1986) is a Swedish retired ice hockey player (goaltender), currently working in the Linköping HC organization. With the Swedish national team she won two Olympic medals, bronze in 2002 and silver in 2006, and two IIHF World Women's Championships bronze medals, in 2005 and 2007. Martin Hasson played in the SDHL with AIK and Linköping HC, in the Russian Women's Hockey League with Tornado Dmitrov, in the NCAA Division I with the Minnesota Duluth Bulldogs, in the J20 SuperElit with the Malmö Redhawks’ junior men's team, and in the J18 Allsvenskan with Hammarby IF's junior men's team.

She was scheduled to make her debut with the Malmö Redhawks of the HockeyAllsvenskan, the second-tier men's league in Sweden, on 8 March 2006, as the first woman to ever play for a professional men's team in Sweden but this move was vetoed by the University of Minnesota Duluth, the U.S. school that had offered her a scholarship to play hockey. This was because the NCAA, the main governing body for U.S. college sports, prohibits athletes at its member schools from having previously played in a professional league, even if they are not paid.

Martin Hasson was inducted into the IIHF Hall of Fame in 2025.

== Playing career ==
=== Minor ice hockey ===
Martin's first season of organized ice hockey was at the age of 10, and she did not allow a goal during the entire 17-game schedule. Martin made her international debut in November 2000 at the Four Nations Cup. She appeared in one game, a 2–2 tie against Finland.

In club competition, she is a two-time European women's champion with AIK, in 2004–05 and 2005–06. She was also acclaimed as the top goaltender in the tournament in 2005–06.

=== University of Minnesota Duluth ===
On 22 March 2008, Martin and the UMD Bulldogs beat the Wisconsin Badgers 4–0 at the Duluth Entertainment Convention Center arena in Duluth, MN for their fourth NCAA Division I national championship. It was just the second shutout in NCAA women's hockey championship history. Martin made 28 saves in the game and 69 total saves in the Frozen Four championship tournament and was named the tournament's Most Outstanding Player. She was also named to the All-Tournament Team along with four of her teammates.

On 19 February 2011, Martin led the Bulldogs to a 9–0 shutout of the St. Cloud State Huskies at Amsoil Arena in Duluth. The win gave Martin 66 wins, a new record for Bulldogs goaltenders. The previous record was held by Martin's former teammate, Riita Schaublin.

On 3 March 2011, Martin was named the WCHA Goaltender of the Year and was named to the league's All-WCHA Second Team.

In 2011–12, Martin played with Team Sweden teammates Elin Holmlov and Danijela Rundqvist for Tornado Moscow of the Russian Women's Hockey League.

=== International play ===
Martin made her international debut for Sweden at the 2001 Women's World Championship, when she was 15 years old. She played in two games, as Sweden finished fifth. She also played for Sweden at the 2002 Winter Olympics, helping them to a third-place finish as a surprise starter for the bronze medal game against Finland. Martin was selected as the starter for the medal game by a coin toss. Martin also suited up for Sweden at the Women's World Championships in 2004, 2005, 2007, and 2008, capturing bronze medals in 2007 and 2009.

Martin made her second appearance at the 2006 Winter Olympics. She was in goal for Sweden when they upset the United States in the semi-final. Martin recorded 37 saves in a shootout victory, marking the first time the women's gold medal final at the Olympics would not feature a Canada – United States matchup. At the conclusion of the tournament, Martin was named the Best Goalie by the International Ice Hockey Federation Directorate and earned a spot on the Tournament All-Star Team.

== Career statistics ==
Year	Team	Event	Result	GP	W	L	T/OT	MIN	GA	SO	GAA	SV%
2002	Sweden	OG	3rd place, bronze medalist(s)	3	2	1	0	180:00	5	1	1.67	0.939
2006	Sweden	OG	2nd place, silver medalist(s)	3	2	1	0	190:00	7	0	2.21	0.927
2010	Sweden	OG	4th	3	1	2	0	148:47	19	1	7.66	0.800
2014	Sweden	OG	4th	2	1	0	0	87:29	1	1	0.69	0.977

== Awards and honors ==
- Kim Martin, 2008 All-WCHA First Team
- 2011 WCHA Goaltending champion
- 2025 inductee into the IIHF Hall of Fame
