= Ice hockey at the 2013 Winter Universiade =

Ice hockey

2013 Winter Universiade men's tournament
Tournament details
- Host country: Italy
- Venues: 2 (in 2 host cities)
- Dates: December 10–21
- Teams: 12

Final positions
- Champions: Canada (4th title)
- Runners-up: Kazakhstan
- Third place: Russia
- Fourth place: United States

Tournament statistics
- Games played: 34
- Goals scored: 240 (7.06 per game)
- Attendance: 13,144 (387 per game)
- Scoring leader: (Kazakhstan) Yevgeniy Rymarev (14 points)

Official website
- universiadetrentino.org

2013 Winter Universiade women's tournament
Tournament details
- Host country: Italy
- Venue: 1 (in 1 host city)
- Dates: December 10–20
- Teams: 6

Final positions
- Champions: Canada (3rd title)
- Runners-up: Russia
- Third place: United States
- Fourth place: Japan

Tournament statistics
- Games played: 20
- Goals scored: 167 (8.35 per game)
- Attendance: 3,619 (181 per game)
- Scoring leader: (Canada) Gabrielle Davidson (22 points)

Official website
- universiadetrentino.org

Ice hockey at the 2013 Winter Universiade was held from December 10 through December 21 at the Municipal Ice Arena in Cavalese and Gianmario Scola Ice Hockey Arena in Val di Fassa (men's matches) and Ice Stadium in Pergine Valsugana (women's matches). The selection of participating teams - 12 in the men's tournament (including hosting Italy) and six in the women's tournament - was announced on July 31, 2013 while the draw to place the teams into their assigned pools took place on September 28, 2013.

== Venues ==
Canazei	Cavalese	Pergine Valsugana
Men		Women
Gianmario Scola; Ice Hockey Arena; Capacity: 2500	Municipal Ice Arena; Capacity: 1630	Ice Stadium; Capacity: 1000

== Men ==
=== Preliminary round ===
Twelve participating teams were placed in the following three groups. After playing a round-robin, the top two teams in each group, plus the top two third-place teams, advanced to the quarterfinals.

Teams received 3 points for a regulation win, 2 points for an overtime/shootout win and 1 point for an overtime/shootout loss. Teams received 3 points for a regulation win, 2 points for an overtime/shootout win and 1 point for an overtime/shootout loss. They were seeded for the playoffs based first on placement within their pool, then by point total, then by fewest goals against, then by goal differential.

All game box scores via winteruniversiade2013.sportresult.com.

==== Group A ====
Team	Pld	W	OTW	OTL	L	GF	GA	GD	Pts	Qualification
Italy	3	2	0	0	1	11	7	+4	6	Advanced to quarterfinals
United States	3	1	1	0	1	6	7	−1	5	Advanced to quarterfinals
Latvia	3	1	0	1	1	9	9	0	4	Advanced to quarterfinals
Sweden	3	1	0	0	2	6	9	−3	3	9th–12th placement round

All times are local (UTC+1).

December 10, 2013; 16:30	Italy	4–2 (1–0, 2–0, 1–2)	Latvia	Gianmario Scola Ice Hockey Arena, Canazei; Attendance: 342

Game reference

Gianluca Vallini
Goalies
Uldis Calpa
Referee:
Robert Hallin (NOR)
Linesmen:
Remi Aasum (NOR)
Gustav Jonsson (SWE)

3:51 – S. Kostner (P. Pircher, F. de Biasio) (PP)	1–0
33:25 – M. Borghi (T. Migliore)	2–0
39:13 – P. Canale (T. Migliore)	3–0
41:11 – F. Gilmozzi (S. Kostner)	4–0
	4–1	45:39 – J. Bullitis (A. Batraks, M. Komuls)
	4–2	50:06 – A. Birstins (E. Lipsbergs) (PP)

8 min
Penalties
14 min
27
Shots
21

December 10, 2013; 20:30	United States	2–0 (1–0, 0–0, 1–0)	Sweden	Gianmario Scola Ice Hockey Arena, Canazei; Attendance: 712

Game reference
Matthew Cooper	Goalies	Emil Helin	Referee: Mario Maillet (CAN); Linesmen: Lauri Nikulainen (FIN); Peter Sheppard (CAN)
16:57 – C. Joseph (D. Green, N. Taurence) / 1–0; 59:49 – R. Bodette (R. Cotcamp, B. Balent) (EN) / 2–0			Referee: Mario Maillet (CAN); Linesmen: Lauri Nikulainen (FIN); Peter Sheppard (CAN)
34 min	Penalties	30 min	Referee: Mario Maillet (CAN); Linesmen: Lauri Nikulainen (FIN); Peter Sheppard (CAN)
47	Shots	19	Referee: Mario Maillet (CAN); Linesmen: Lauri Nikulainen (FIN); Peter Sheppard (CAN)

December 13, 2013; 16:30	Sweden	4–2 (0–1, 3–0, 1–1)	Italy	Gianmario Scola Ice Hockey Arena, Canazei; Attendance: 412

Game reference

Emil Helin
Goalies
Alessandro Tura
Gianluca Vallini
Referee:
Marian Rohatsch (GER)
Linesmen:
Marcus Hofer (GER)
Frederic Monnaie (BEL)

	0–1	12:07 – S. Kostner (P. Pircher, F. de Biasio) (PP)
21:47 – J. Ljunggren (J. Lindqvist)	1–1
32:01 – J. Thomson (D. Jonsson)	2–1
39:31 – P. Aronsson (J. Thomson, P. Hastlund) (PP)	3–1
	3–2	40:51 – F. de Biasio (P. Pircher, S. Kostner) (PP)
42:36 – S. Bergqvist (P. Renstrom, M. Moritz)	4–2

10 min
Penalties
8 min
18
Shots
25

December 13, 2013; 20:30	Latvia	2–3 OT (1–1, 1–1, 0–0) (OT: 0–1)	United States	Gianmario Scola Ice Hockey Arena, Canazei; Attendance: 215

Game reference

Uldis Calpa
Goalies
Wyatt Waselenchuk
Referee:
Lars Hall (SWE)
Linesmen:
Gustav Jonsson (SWE)
Simone Lega (ITA)

11:48 – M. Komuls (J. Bullitis, A. Abolins) (PP)	1–0
	1–1	16:09 – B. McGinty (D. McAuliffe, P. Wendecker) (PP)
	1–2	29:35 – R. Bodette (S. Murphy, N. Taurence) (PP)
39:05 – A. Batraks (M. Komuls) (PP)	2–2
	2–3	62:29 – P. Wendecker (S. Brancheau, N. Taurence) (PP)

22 min
Penalties
16 min
13
Shots
48

December 15, 2013; 16:30	Italy	5–1 (1–0, 3–0, 1–1)	United States	Gianmario Scola Ice Hockey Arena, Canazei; Attendance: 880

Game reference

Gianluca Vallini
Goalies
Matthew Cooper
Wyatt Waselenchuk
Referee:
Robert Cech (CZE)
Linesmen:
Thomas Pettersen (NOR)
Martin Smrek (SVK)

5:02 – P. Mair (S. Kostner, F. de Biasio) (PP)	1–0
26:31 – M. Borghi (M. Stevan, E. Miglioranzi) (PP)	2–0
27:34 – T. Migliore (M. Borghi) (PP)	3–0
33:46 – T. Migliore (M. Borghi)	4–0
	4–1	42:48 – B. McGinty (G. Sargis, J. Young) (PP)
54:20 – M. Borghi (E. Miglioranzi)	5–1

22 min
Penalties
14 min
20
Shots
33

December 15, 2013; 20:30	Sweden	2–5 (1–2, 1–1, 0–2)	Latvia	Gianmario Scola Ice Hockey Arena, Canazei; Attendance: N/A

Game reference

Sebastian Jonsson
Goalies
Henrijs Ancs
Referee:
Ville Stigell (FIN)
Linesmen:
Jiri Ondracek (CZE)
Federico Stefenelli (ITA)

	0–1	2:43 – K. Brants (E. Lipsbergs)
	0–2	4:51 – M. Komuls (A. Batraks)
18:59 – K. Bolke (J. Thomson, W. Westlund)	1–2
	1–3	25:50 – K. Apsitis (E. Lipsbergs) (PP)
37:46 – J. Lindqvist (D. Jakobsson) (PP)	2–3
	2–4	57:34 – K. Legzdins (R. Melders)
	2–5	59:16 – M. Komuls (A. Batraks) (EN)

10 min
Penalties
8 min
24
Shots
39

==== Group B ====
Team	Pld	W	OTW	OTL	L	GF	GA	GD	Pts	Qualification
Russia	3	3	0	0	0	20	2	+18	9	Advanced to quarterfinals
Slovakia	3	1	1	0	1	15	7	+8	5	Advanced to quarterfinals
Czech Republic	3	1	0	1	1	15	10	+5	4	Advanced to quarterfinals
Great Britain	3	0	0	0	3	0	31	−31	0	9th–12th placement round

All times are local (UTC+1).

December 12, 2013; 16:30	Russia	8–0 (2–0, 3–0, 3–0)	Great Britain	Gianmario Scola Ice Hockey Arena, Canazei; Attendance: 235

Game reference

Yury Lavretskiy
Danila Alistratov
Goalies
James Flavell
Referee:
Robert Cech (CZE)
Linesmen:
Martin Smrek (SVK)
Federico Stefenelli (ITA)

3:49 – A. Demidov (P. Kopytin, A. Scherbina)	1–0
7:43 – A. Podshendyalov (V. Mordvinov)	2–0
26:34 – Y. Nazarov (A. Lozhkin)	3–0
33:59 – Y. Alyoshin	4–0
35:33 – V. Mordvinov (A. Podshendyalov) (PP)	5–0
44:07 – P. Kopytin (A. Lozhkin, A. Ugolnikov) (PP)	6–0
48:11 – P. Kopytin (A. Demidov)	7–0
49:24 – V. Mordvinov (A. Podshendyalov)	8–0

4 min
Penalties
8 min
80
Shots
12

December 12, 2013; 20:30	Slovakia	3–2 SO (1–1, 1–0, 0–1) (OT: 0–0) (SO: 1–0)	Czech Republic	Gianmario Scola Ice Hockey Arena, Canazei; Attendance: 380

Game reference

Igor Cibula
Goalies
Jiri Slama
Tomas Kral
Referee:
Lars Hall (SWE)
Linesmen:
Remi Aasum (NOR)
Thomas Pettersen (NOR)

5:57 – M. Baran (M. Kalinac, M. Rais)	1–0
	1–1	6:25 – D. Matula (L. Kovarik, J. Havelka)
37:10 – M. Baran (M. Kalinac)	2–1
	2–2	42:31 – J. Babka (R. Vanek) (PP)

P. Gapa (miss)
P. Boltun (miss)
M. Kalinac
Shootout
(miss) D. Matula
(miss) D. Brezina
(miss) J. Babka
10 min
Penalties
14 min
43
Shots
24

December 14, 2013; 16:30	Czech Republic	1–7 (0–2, 1–2, 0–3)	Russia	Gianmario Scola Ice Hockey Arena, Canazei; Attendance: 267

Game reference

Tomas Kral
Goalies
Danila Alistratov
Referee:
Mario Maillet (CAN)
Linesmen:
Thomas Pettersen (NOR)
Peter Sheppard (CAN)

	0–1	7:35 – K. Turukin (Y. Nazarov, V. Mitryakov)
	0–2	12:57 – K. Putilov (P. Kopytin, A. Scherbina)
	0–3	22:11 – Y. Alyoshin (K. Fast, D. Faizullin)
	0–4	26:31 – A. Sumin (V. Mitryakov) (PP)
30:35 – L. Kovarik (D. Matula, V. Mika) (PP)	1–4
	1–5	41:52 – A. Ugolnikov (V. Mordvinov, A. Podshendyalov)
	1–6	53:40 – A. Scherbina (A. Lozhkin)
	1–7	59:25 – K. Turukin (Y. Nazarov, A. Lozhkin)

12 min
Penalties
20 min
37
Shots
43

December 14, 2013; 20:30	Great Britain	0–11 (0–4, 0–1, 0–6)	Slovakia	Gianmario Scola Ice Hockey Arena, Canazei; Attendance: 182

Game reference

James Flavell
Goalies
Igor Cibula
Referee:
Ville Stigell (FIN)
Linesmen:
Remi Aasum (NOR)
Marcus Hofer (GER)

0–1	2:49 – R. Cutt (M. Baran, J. Loydl)
0–2	4:40 – E. Piacka (M. Kalinac, E. Sedivy)
0–3	6:44 – T. Tartal (T. Daniska, P. Cizek)
0–4	12:42 – M. Kalinac (E. Sedivy, M. Rais)
0–5	20:13 – M. Balaz (P. Boltun, D. Kramar)
0–6	43:47 – B. Varga (P. Gapa, M. Habsuda) (PP)
0–7	44:54 – D. Kramar (M. Balaz, P. Slimak) (PP)
0–8	45:19 – D. Brejcak (P. Cizek, T. Tartal)
0–9	47:23 – M. Habsuda (P. Gapa, B. Varga)
0–10	52:58 – T. Daniska (P. Cizek, T. Tartal) (PP)
0–11	54:59 – P. Gapa (B. Varga)

16 min
Penalties
8 min
6
Shots
90

December 16, 2013; 16:30	Russia	5–1 (2–1, 2–0, 1–0)	Slovakia	Gianmario Scola Ice Hockey Arena, Canazei; Attendance: 284

Game reference

Yury Lavretskiy
Goalies
Marek Srnec
Referee:
Marian Rohatsch (GER)
Linesmen:
Frederic Monnaie (BEL)
Lauri Nikulainen (FIN)

	0–1	3:26 – O. Gmitter (D. Kramar) (PP)
13:54 – Y. Nazarov (V. Mitryakov, K. Putilov) (PP)	1–1
17:53 – P. Kopytin (K. Polyanskiy, A. Ugolnikov)	2–1
20:52 – V. Mordvinov (D. Faizullin)	3–1
33:33 – V. Menshikov (A. Sumin, D. Faizullin) (PP)	4–1
47:22 – K. Polyanskiy (V. Sokolov)	5–1

16 min
Penalties
24 min
19
Shots
33

December 16, 2013; 20:30	Czech Republic	12–0 (6–0, 2–0, 4–0)	Great Britain	Gianmario Scola Ice Hockey Arena, Canazei; Attendance: 75

Game reference

Tomas Kral
Goalies
James Flavell
Luke Lawrance
Referee:
Robert Hallin (NOR)
Linesmen:
Remi Aasum (NOR)
Marcus Hofer (GER)

1:20 – A. Ruzicka (D. Brezina, P. Poulicek)	1–0
3:29 – K. Richter (V. Sik)	2–0
4:13 – L. Kovarik (D. Matula, M. Kubik)	3–0
5:30 – P. Novak (J. Loucka, J. Babka)	4–0
19:37 – R. Vanek (J. Babka, D. Steiner)	5–0
19:47 – P. Poulicek (D. Brezina, K. Richter)	6–0
32:44 – R. Vanek (J. Babka, D. Steiner)	7–0
38:44 – J. Babka (D. Steiner) (SH)	8–0
41:04 – J. Kolda (L. Kovarik) (PP)	9–0
44:11 – D. Matula (L. Kovarik, M. Kubik)	10–0
51:20 – D. Steiner (J. Babka, J. Loucka)	11–0
58:36 – O. Peska (D. Novak)	12–0

4 min
Penalties
12 min
97
Shots
5

==== Group C ====
Team	Pld	W	OTW	OTL	L	GF	GA	GD	Pts	Qualification
Kazakhstan	3	3	0	0	0	11	5	+6	9	Advanced to quarterfinals
Canada	3	2	0	0	1	25	5	+20	6	Advanced to quarterfinals
Ukraine	3	0	1	0	2	6	18	−12	2	9th–12th placement round
Japan	3	0	0	1	2	5	19	−14	1	9th–12th placement round

All times are local (UTC+1).

December 10, 2013; 20:00	Canada	12–1 (5–1, 1–0, 6–0)	Japan	Municipal Ice Arena, Cavalese; Attendance: 475

Game reference

Wayne Savage
Goalies
Takuto Onada
Referee:
Marian Rohatsch (GER)
Linesmen:
Marcus Hofer (GER)
Simone Lega (ITA)

5:16 – C. Tanaka (C. DeSousa, A. Wall) (SH)	1–0
7:11 – N. MacNeil (C. Owens, M. Cazzola)	2–0
8:56 – N. MacNeil (M. Desnoyers, J. Day) (SH)	3–0
	3–1	12:14 – R. Omiya (S. Yamasaki) (PP)
12:55 – M. Cazzola (J. Day)	4–1
19:58 – N. MacNeil (M. Cazzola)	5–1
39:01 – N. MacNeil (M. Cazzola, C. Owens) (PP)	6–1
41:51 – M. Kirkpatrick (T. Carroll, J. Day)	7–1
45:00 – C. Tanaka (R. Slaney, A. Wall) (PP)	8–1
45:12 – E. Faille (M. Cazzola, M. Kirkpatrick) (PP)	9–1
50:00 – L. Bloodoff (R. Slaney, A. Wall)	10–1
50:14 – P. Vandall (M. Cazzola, N. MacNeil)	11–1
50:59 – E. Faille (R. Slaney, M. Kirkpatrick)	12–1

29 min
Penalties
31 min
58
Shots
16

December 12, 2013; 20:00	Kazakhstan	4–2 (2–1, 1–0, 1–1)	Ukraine	Municipal Ice Arena, Cavalese; Attendance: 286

Game reference

Dmitri Malgin
Goalies
Ievgenii Napnenko
Referee:
Ville Stigell (FIN)
Linesmen:
Frederic Monnaie (BEL)
Jiri Ondracek (CZE)

3:21 – Y. Rymarev (A. Shin)	1–0
	1–1	6:07 – O. Voytsekhovsky (O. Zadoenko)
17:48 – Y. Rymarev (A. Shin, A. Lipin) (PP)	2–1
31:07 – A. Ignatenko (A. Shin, L. Metalnikov)	3–1
43:34 – A. Zubkov (A. Shin) (PP)	4–1
	4–2	51:27 – S. Babynets (I. Sekirko, R. Svyrydov) (PP)

8 min
Penalties
18 min
38
Shots
22

December 13, 2013; 20:00	Canada	11–0 (3–0, 5–0, 3–0)	Ukraine	Municipal Ice Arena, Cavalese; Attendance: 540

Game reference

Anthony Peters
Goalies
Andrii Bezkhlibnyi
Ievgenii Napnenko
Referee:
Robert Hallin (NOR)
Linesmen:
Lauri Nikulainen (FIN)
Federico Stefenelli (ITA)

13:28 – E. Faille	1–0
17:18 – E. Faille (N. MacNeil, M. Kirkpatrick) (PP)	2–0
18:10 – M. Cazzola (C. DeSousa, M. D'Orazio)	3–0
25:05 – J. Day (C. DeSousa, M. Maione) (PP)	4–0
25:34 – P. Vandall (J. Day, M. Maione) (PP)	5–0
26:29 – N. MacNeil (L. Heelis)	6–0
28:39 – C. Tanaka (P. Vandall, M. Kirkpatrick)	7–0
31:08 – C. Tanaka (P. Vandall, M. Maione) (PP)	8–0
42:39 – L. Heelis (P. Vandall)	9–0
46:21 – N. MacNeil (M. Cazzola, L. Heelis)	10–0
46:32 – M. Kirkpatrick (E. Faille)	11–0

60 min
Penalties
101 min
59
Shots
14

December 14, 2013; 20:00	Kazakhstan	3–1 (1–0, 1–0, 1–1)	Japan	Municipal Ice Arena, Cavalese; Attendance: 290

Game reference

Andrey Yankov
Goalies
Shun Hitomi
Referee:
Robert Cech (CZE)
Linesmen:
Jiri Ondracek (CZE)
Martin Smrek (SVK)

4:31 – K. Savenkov (A. Ignatenko)	1–0
32:46 – A. Zubkov (SH)	2–0
	2–1	43:47 – H. Satoh (I. Ikeda, Y. Takami) (PP)
56:14 – A. Vorontsov (N. Belgibayev) (PP)	3–1

16 min
Penalties
14 min
48
Shots
24

December 15, 2013; 20:00	Canada	2–4 (1–0, 0–3, 1–1)	Kazakhstan	Municipal Ice Arena, Cavalese; Attendance: 620

Game reference

Wayne Savage
Goalies
Andrey Yankov
Referee:
Lars Hall (SWE)
Linesmen:
Gustav Jonsson (SWE)
Simone Lega (ITA)

13:31 – T. Carroll (C. Culligan)	1–0
	1–1	20:32 – L. Metalnikov (A. Shin, Y. Rymarev) (PP)
	1–2	29:22 – N. Kovzalov (A. Grichshenko, P. Zhilin)
	1–3	37:26 – Y. Rymarev (A. Shin) (SH)
44:57 – S. Lacroix (C. Tanaka, R. Slaney)	2–3
	2–4	58:27 – Y. Rymarev (L. Metalnikov) (PP)

16 min
Penalties
8 min
24
Shots
26

December 16, 2013; 20:00	Ukraine	4–3 SO (0–1, 0–1, 3–1) (OT: 0–0) (SO: 1–0)	Japan	Municipal Ice Arena, Cavalese; Attendance: 185

Game reference

Ievgenii Napnenko
Goalies
Takuto Onoda
Referee:
Mario Maillet (CAN)
Linesmen:
Gustav Jonsson (SWE)
Peter Sheppard (CAN)

	0–1	10:22 – K. Otsu (K. Yamada, M. Furuhashi)
	0–2	32:09 – T. Katsuta (I. Ikeda, S. Sawazaki)
50:19 – D. Khonin	1–2
	1–3	51:08 – Y. Takami
52:12 – V. Kyrychenko (S. Babynets, D. Khonin)	2–3
53:15 – O. Zadoenko (R. Svyrydov)	3–3

N. Butsenko
S. Babynets
Shootout
(miss) I. Ikeda
(miss) S. Nakajima
8 min
Penalties
8 min
39
Shots
21

=== 9th–12th placement round ===
All times are local (UTC+1).

December 17, 2013; 16:00	Ukraine	14–1 (3–0, 6–0, 5–1)	Great Britain	Municipal Ice Arena, Cavalese; Attendance: 80

Game reference

Ievgenii Napnenko
Andrii Bezkhlibnyi
Goalies
James Flavell
Luke Lawrance
Referee:
Lars Hall (SWE)
Linesmen:
Simone Lega (ITA)
Frederic Monnaie (BEL)

4:16 – O. Zadoenko (D. Khonin)	1–0
7:01 – D. Khonin (P. Akymov) (PP)	2–0
7:36 – D. Demianiuk (O. Zadoenko, N. Butsenko)	3–0
34:12 – R. Svyrydov	4–0
34:45 – V. Aleksiuk (V. Kyrychenko, D. Khonin)	5–0
35:29 – A. Ievseichyk (S. Babynets, D. Isaienko)	6–0
36:19 – S. Babynets (D. Isaienko, A. Ievseichyk)	7–0
37:21 – V. Aleksiuk (D. Nimenko)	8–0
38:04 – N. Butsenko (D. Demianiuk, A. Ievseichyk)	9–0
41:49 – I. Sekirko (SH)	10–0
43:07 – V. Kyrychenko (V. Aleksiuk) (SH)	11–0
45:37 – D. Isaienko (S. Babynets, I. Sekirko)	12–0
48:20 – O. Zadoenko (N. Butsenko)	13–0
50:11 – A. Ievseichyk (I. Sekirko)	14–0
	14–1	50:35 – S. Mogg (S. Tonnar)

10 min
Penalties
18 min
60
Shots
17

December 17, 2013; 20:00	Sweden	2–1 OT (0–0, 1–0, 0–1) (OT: 1–0)	Japan	Municipal Ice Arena, Cavalese; Attendance: 240

Game reference

Emil Helin
Goalies
Shun Hitomi
Referee:
Robert Cech (CZE)
Linesmen:
Jiri Ondracek (CZE)
Federico Stefenelli (ITA)

23:05 – W. Westlund (P. Renstrom, S. Bergqvist) (PP)	1–0
	1–1	41:32 – M. Furuhashi (Y. Takami, H. Satoh)
61:27 – J. Thomson	2–1

6 min
Penalties
6 min
28
Shots
39

==== 11th place match ====
December 19, 2013; 20:00	Japan	7–2 (4–2, 0–0, 3–0)	Great Britain	Municipal Ice Arena, Cavalese; Attendance: 170

Game reference

Takuto Onoda
Goalies
James Flavell
Referee:
Robert Hallin (NOR)
Linesmen:
Thomas Pettersen (NOR)
Peter Sheppard (CAN)

	0–1	2:46 – S. Bullas (A. Harding)
3:52 – S. Nakajima	1–1
8:02 – M. Shinohara (S. Yamasaki) (PP)	2–1
8:19 – I. Ikeda (T. Katsuta)	3–1
12:17 – M. Furuhashi (K. Otsu)	4–1
	4–2	16:36 – S. Tonnar (S. Bullas, L. Piggott)
43:21 – H. Satoh	5–2
48:16 – K. Yamada (K. Otsu, I. Ikeda) (PP)	6–2
50:21 – M. Furuhashi (S. Yamamoto, Y. Takami)	7–2

6 min
Penalties
10 min
65
Shots
25

==== 9th place match ====
December 19, 2013; 16:00	Ukraine	6–5 OT (1–0, 2–2, 2–3) (OT: 1–0)	Sweden	Municipal Ice Arena, Cavalese; Attendance: 105

Game reference

Ievgenii Napnenko
Goalies
Emil Helin
Referee:
Mario Maillet (CAN)
Linesmen:
Frederic Monnaie (BEL)
Federico Stefenelli (ITA)

17:06 – V. Kyrychenko (O. Zadoenko, N. Butsenko) (PP)	1–0
22:35 – I. Sekirko (S. Babynets, D. Nimenko)	2–0
	2–1	26:24 – D. Jonsson (J. Thomson)
	2–2	32:41 – P. Hastlund (J. Lindkvist) (PP)
35:21 – D. Demianiuk (S. Babynets, D. Khonin)	3–2
41:04 – S. Babynets (I. Sekirko, D. Khonin) (PP)	4–2
53:08 – D. Isaienko (S. Babynets)	5–2
	5–3	54:51 – P. Renstrom (PS)
	5–4	56:24 – P. Renstrom (W. Westlund, M. Moritz) (PP)
	5–5	58:34 – J. Thomson (P. Hastlund) (SH)
61:29 – V. Aleksiuk (I. Sekirko) (PP)	6–5

14 min
Penalties
22 min
30
Shots
28

=== Playoff round ===
Quarterfinals
2	Kazakhstan	6
7	Latvia	1
3	Italy	0
6	United States	5
1	Russia	5
8	Czech Republic	1
4	Canada	6
5	Slovakia	0

Semifinals
2	Kazakhstan	5
6	United States	1
1	Russia	1
4	Canada	2

Gold Medal
2	Kazakhstan	2
4	Canada	6
Bronze Medal
1	Russia	6
6	United States	2

All times are local (UTC+1).

==== Quarterfinals ====
December 18, 2013; 16:00	Kazakhstan	6–1 (3–0, 1–1, 2–0)	Latvia	Municipal Ice Arena, Cavalese; Attendance: 185

Game reference

Andrey Yankov
Goalies
Henrijs Ancs
Referee:
Robert Hallin (NOR)
Linesmen:
Thomas Pettersen (NOR)
Martin Smrek (SVK)

3:51 – A. Shin (Y. Rymarev)	1–0
8:43 – N. Kovzalov (A. Grichshenko, V. Belan)	2–0
11:21 – A. Zubkov (Y. Rymarev, L. Metalnikov)	3–0
21:26 – A. Ignatenko (K. Savenkov)	4–0
	4–1	25:32 – A. Batraks (M. Komuls, J. Bullitis)
50:12 – L. Metalnikov (Y. Rymarev, A. Zubkov) (PP)	5–1
57:31 – Y. Rymarev (L. Metalnikov, A. Lipin) (PP)	6–1

20 min
Penalties
14 min
49
Shots
23

December 18, 2013; 16:30	Russia	5–1 (2–0, 2–1, 1–0)	Czech Republic	Gianmario Scola Ice Hockey Arena, Canazei; Attendance: 110

Game reference

Danila Alistratov
Goalies
Jiri Slama
Referee:
Mario Maillet (CAN)
Linesmen:
Marcus Hofer (GER)
Peter Sheppard (CAN)

15:01 – V. Menshikov (Y. Nazarov, A. Sumin) (PP)	1–0
18:07 – A. Scherbina (P. Kopytin, A. Demidov) (PP)	2–0
	2–1	29:33 – D. Matula (L. Kovarik, V. Sik) (PP)
31:02 – K. Turukin (V. Menshikov, A. Ugolnikov) (PP)	3–1
39:59 – V. Mordvinov (A. Sumin, V. Menshikov)	4–1
58:59 – V. Sokolov (K. Polyanskiy, A. Lozhkin)	5–1

12 min
Penalties
20 min
52
Shots
20

December 18, 2013; 20:00	Canada	6–0 (3–0, 1–0, 2–0)	Slovakia	Municipal Ice Arena, Cavalese; Attendance: 600

Game reference

Anthony Peters
Goalies
Igor Cibula
Referee:
Ville Stigell (FIN)
Linesmen:
Simone Lega (ITA)
Lauri Nikulainen (FIN)

7:09 – L. Heelis (N. MacNeil) (PP)	1–0
15:00 – T. Carroll (C. Culligan, E. Faille)	2–0
15:22 – C. DeSousa (C. Tanaka, M. Kirkpatrick	3–0
35:45 – L. Bloodoff (C. Tanaka, M. Kirkpatrick)	4–0
49:15 – C. Culligan (A. Wall, E. Faille)	5–0
52:20 – T. Carroll (E. Faille, C. Culligan)	6–0

18 min
Penalties
16 min
47
Shots
17

December 18, 2013; 20:30	Italy	0–5 (0–2, 0–0, 0–3)	United States	Gianmario Scola Ice Hockey Arena, Canazei; Attendance: 812

Game reference

Gianluca Vallini
Goalies
Wyatt Waselenchuk
Referee:
Marian Rohatsch (GER)
Linesmen:
Remi Aasum (NOR)
Gustav Jonsson (SWE)

0–1	6:42 – J. Feavel (R. Cotcamp, P. Wendecker)
0–2	18:22 – P. Wendecker (B. McGinty, D. McAuliffe (PP)
0–3	47:43 – D. McAuliffe (B. McGinty, J. Young) (PP)
0–4	49:51 – J. Olen
0–5	58:33 – R. Cotcamp

16 min
Penalties
16 min
13
Shots
50

==== 5th–8th placement matches ====
December 19, 2013; 16:30	Slovakia	4–1 (0–1, 1–0, 3–0)	Czech Republic	Gianmario Scola Ice Hockey Arena, Canazei; Attendance: 60

Game reference

Igor Cibula
Goalies
Tomas Kral
Referee:
Lars Hall (SWE)
Linesmen:
Gustav Jonsson (SWE)
Lauri Nikulainen (FIN)

	0–1	18:43 – J. Babka (P. Poulicek)
37:11 – M. Kalinac (E. Piacka, E. Sedivy)	1–1
47:02 – R. Cutt (M. Habsuda)	2–1
56:12 – M. Kalinac (M. Baran, E. Piacka)	3–1
56:43 – P. Boltun (J. Kentos, B. Varga)	4–1

8 min
Penalties
8 min
29
Shots
30

December 19, 2013; 20:30	Italy	4–1 (0–0, 4–1, 0–0)	Latvia	Gianmario Scola Ice Hockey Arena, Canazei; Attendance: 115

Game reference

Gianluca Vallini
Goalies
Uldis Calpa
Henrijs Ancs
Referee:
Robert Cech (CZE)
Linesmen:
Jiri Ondracek (CZE)
Martin Smrek (SVK)

23:25 – E. Miglioranzi (T. Migliore, M. Borghi) (PP)	1–0
29:17 – F. Gilmozzi (E. Miglioranzi)	2–0
32:29 – S. Kostner	3–0
	3–1	37:32 – K. Kuplais (R. Melders)
39:25 – S. Kostner (T. Erlacher, P. Mair) (PP)	4–1

30 min
Penalties
28 min
28
Shots
29

==== 7th place match ====
December 20, 2013; 20:00	Latvia	1–8 (0–1, 0–3, 1–4)	Czech Republic	Municipal Ice Arena, Cavalese; Attendance: 130

Game reference

Henrijs Ancs
Goalies
Jiri Slama
Referee:
Robert Hallin (NOR)
Linesmen:
Remi Aasum (NOR)
Martin Smrek (SVK)

	0–1	5:04 – O. Peska (P. Novak, R. Zhanal)
	0–2	30:17 – A. Ruzicka (D. Matula, M. Stedry)
	0–3	32:27 – D. Brezina (K. Richter, J. Kolda)
	0–4	36:54 – P. Novak (O. Peska, M. Stedry)
	0–5	40:26 – R. Vanek (J. Babka)
	0–6	45:18 – A. Ruzicka (P. Poulicek)
45:30 – A. Birstins (A. Ogorodnikovs)	1–6
	1–7	53:13 – J. Babka
	1–8	58:40 – V. Mika (D. Matula, L. Kovarik) (PP)

35 min
Penalties
12 min
12
Shots
32

==== 5th place match ====
December 20, 2013; 16:00	Italy	2–4 (1–1, 1–1, 0–2)	Slovakia	Municipal Ice Arena, Cavalese; Attendance: 180

Game reference

Gianluca Vallini
Goalies
Igor Cibula
Referee:
Robert Cech (CZE)
Linesmen:
Thomas Pettersen (NOR)
Peter Sheppard (CAN)

	0–1	5:08 – M. Baran (M. Habsuda, M. Kalinac) (PP)
12:27 – F. Haidacher (F. Borghi)	1–1
23:47 – T. Erlacher (P. Mair)	2–1
	2–2	38:50 – M. Baran (M. Rais)
	2–3	40:45 – R. Cutt (O. Gmitter)
	2–4	57:13 – M. Baran (EN)

6 min
Penalties
6 min
23
Shots
28

==== Semifinals ====
December 20, 2013; 16:30	Russia	1–2 (0–1, 0–0, 1–1)	Canada	Gianmario Scola Ice Hockey Arena, Canazei; Attendance: 425

Game reference

Danila Alistratov
Goalies
Anthony Peters
Referees:
Lars Hall (SWE)
Ville Stigell (FIN)
Linesmen:
Marcus Hofer (GER)
Lauri Nikulainen (FIN)

	0–1	19:43 – T. Carroll (M. Desnoyers)
	0–2	40:34 – E. Faille (T. Carroll)
58:10 – P. Kopytin (A. Scherbina, E. Kutugin)	1–2

8 min
Penalties
14 min
20
Shots
38

December 20, 2013; 20:30	Kazakhstan	5–1 (1–0, 1–0, 3–1)	United States	Gianmario Scola Ice Hockey Arena, Canazei; Attendance: 512

Game reference

Andrey Yankov
Goalies
Wyatt Waselenchuk
Referees:
Mario Maillet (CAN)
Marian Rohatsch (GER)
Linesmen:
Simone Lega (ITA)
Jiri Ondracek (CZE)

7:36 – A. Shin (A. Lipin, L. Metalnikov)	1–0
20:29 – Y. Rymarev (L. Metalnikov, A. Shin) (PP)	2–0
41:59 – Y. Rymarev (A. Shin)	3–0
	3–1	47:32 – S. Murphy (R. Cotcamp, J. Young)
48:14 – A. Lipin (Y. Rymarev, A. Shin)	4–1
52:43 – N. Kovzalov (K. Savenkov, A. Ishmametyev)	5–1

12 min
Penalties
20 min
42
Shots
29

==== Bronze medal match ====
December 21, 2013; 10:30	Russia	6–2 (3–1, 2–0, 1–1)	United States	Gianmario Scola Ice Hockey Arena, Canazei; Attendance: 140

Game reference

Yury Lavretskiy
Goalies
Matthew Cooper
Referees:
Mario Maillet (CAN)
Ville Stigell (FIN)
Linesmen:
Peter Sheppard (CAN)
Federico Stefenelli (ITA)

5:42 – D. Faizullin (K. Polyanskiy)	1–0
8:18 – A. Sumin (Y. Nazarov, V. Mitryakov) (PP)	2–0
9:25 – A. Demidov (A. Scherbina)	3–0
	3–1	18:43 – J. Feavel (S. Murphy)
20:42 – A. Demidov (P. Kopytin)	4–1
32:02 – K. Putilov (A. Demidov, P. Kopytin) (PP)	5–1
53:39 – A. Sumin (A. Demidov, V. Menshikov) (PP)	6–1
	6–2	55:53 – G. Sargis (D. McAuliffe, P. Wendecker) (PP)

12 min
Penalties
18 min
25
Shots
37

==== Gold medal match ====
December 21, 2013; 14:30	Kazakhstan	2–6 (1–3, 0–2, 1–1)	Canada	Gianmario Scola Ice Hockey Arena, Canazei; Attendance: 2600

Game reference

Andrey Yankov
Goalies
Anthony Peters
Referees:
Lars Hall (SWE)
Marian Rohatsch (GER)
Linesmen:
Gustav Jonsson (SWE)
Frederic Monnaie (BEL)

0:14 – A. Shin (Y. Rymarev)	1–0
	1–1	3:39 – M. Cazzola (M. D'Orazio)
	1–2	5:25 – J. Day (L. Bloodoff)
	1–3	7:16 – M. Maione (C. Tanaka)
	1–4	25:24 – C. Culligan (T. Carroll, E. Faille)
	1–5	32:03 – N. MacNeil (C. Culligan, C. Owens) (PP)
	1–6	48:32 – C. Culligan (M. Desnoyers, J. Day) (PP)
52:27 – A. Shin (R. Zharkikh, Y. Rymarev) (PP)	2–6

155 min
Penalties
91 min
21
Shots
54

=== Final standings ===
1st place, gold medalist(s)	Canada
2nd place, silver medalist(s)	Kazakhstan
3rd place, bronze medalist(s)	Russia
4	United States
5	Slovakia
6	Italy
7	Czech Republic
8	Latvia
9	Ukraine
10	Sweden
11	Japan
12	(United Kingdom) Great Britain

=== Scoring leaders ===
List shows the top skaters sorted by points, then goals.

Player	GP	G	A	Pts	+/−	PIM	POS
(Kazakhstan) Yevgeniy Rymarev	6	7	7	14	+6	4	F
(Kazakhstan) Alexander Shin	6	4	9	13	+6	24	F
(Canada) Nick MacNeil	6	7	3	10	+5	27	F
(Canada) Eric Faille	6	5	5	10	+8	4	F
(Czech Republic) Jakub Babka	6	4	5	9	+5	8	F
(Russia) Pavel Kopytin	6	4	5	9	+8	2	F
(Ukraine) Sergii Babynets	5	3	6	9	+6	4	F
(Canada) Mike Cazzola	6	3	6	9	+9	6	F
(Slovakia) Martin Kalinac	6	4	4	8	+7	2	F
(Canada) Cory Tanaka	6	4	4	8	+9	8	F
(Canada) Michael Kirkpatrick	6	2	6	8	+7	4	F
(Kazakhstan) Leonid Metalnikov	6	2	6	8	+4	4	D
(Slovakia) Martin Baran	6	5	2	7	+8	2	F
(Canada) Tyler Carroll	6	4	3	7	+5	37	F
(Italy) Simon Kostner	6	4	3	7	–3	2	F

GP = Games played; G = Goals; A = Assists; Pts = Points; +/− = Plus/minus; PIM = Penalties in minutes; POS = Position
Source: universiadetrentino.org

=== Leading goaltenders ===
Only the top six goaltenders, based on save percentage, who have played at least 40% of their team's minutes, are included in this list.

Player	TOI	GA	GAA	SA	Sv%	SO
(Russia) Yury Lavretskiy	150:32	3	1.20	78	96.15	0
(Russia) Danila Alistratov	208:44	4	1.15	99	95.96	0
(Canada) Anthony Peters	240:00	3	0.75	72	95.83	2
(Kazakhstan) Andrey Yankov	300:00	11	2.20	154	92.86	0
(Sweden) Emil Helin	242:33	10	2.47	140	92.86	0
(Italy) Gianluca Vallini	315:34	12	2.28	163	92.64	0

TOI = Time on ice (minutes:seconds); SA = Shots against; GA = Goals against; GAA = Goals against average; Sv% = Save percentage; SO = Shutouts
Source: universiadetrentino.org

== Women ==
=== Preliminary round ===
Six participating teams were placed into a single group. After playing a round-robin, the teams ranked first through fourth advanced to the semifinals.

Teams received 3 points for a regulation win, 2 points for an overtime/shootout win and 1 point for an overtime/shootout loss. They were seeded for the playoffs first by point total, then by fewest goals against.

All game box scores via winteruniversiade2013.sportresult.com.

Team	Pld	W	OTW	OTL	L	GF	GA	GD	Pts	Qualification
Canada	5	5	0	0	0	57	2	+55	15	Advanced to semifinals
Russia	5	3	0	0	2	35	12	+23	9	Advanced to semifinals
United States	5	3	0	0	2	15	14	+1	9	Advanced to semifinals
Japan	5	3	0	0	2	20	15	+5	9	Advanced to semifinals
Great Britain	5	0	1	0	4	5	39	−34	2	5th place match
Spain	5	0	0	1	4	2	52	−50	1	5th place match

All times are local (UTC+1).

December 10, 2013; 12:00	Great Britain	1–10 (0–3, 0–6, 1–1)	Japan	Ice Stadium, Pergine Valsugana; Attendance: 200

Game reference

Samantha Bolwell
Goalies
Hazuki Maeda
Yae Unosawa
Referee:
Melissa Szkola (USA)
Linesmen:
Anna Nygard (NOR)
Anna Hammar (SWE)

	0–1	2:55 – A. Ohashi (K. Kimura)
	0–2	6:58 – M. Morii (R. Sakamoto)
	0–3	8:20 – M. Morii (S. Yuyama)
	0–4	22:10 – M. Toma (Y. Ota)
	0–5	27:24 – Y. Ota (R. Sakamoto)
	0–6	31:58 – R. Sakamoto (M. Morii)
	0–7	35:21 – Y. Ota (A. Ichijo)
	0–8	38:22 – A. Ohashi
	0–9	39:14 – A. Ichijo (N. Fujimoto, S. Yuyama) (PP)
40:16 – N. Davies (S. Allen)	1–9
	1–10	53:13 – R. Sakamoto (M. Yoshida) (PP)

12 min
Penalties
4 min
4
Shots
56

December 10, 2013; 16:00	Russia	2–4 (1–2, 0–1, 1–1)	United States	Ice Stadium, Pergine Valsugana; Attendance: 150

Game reference

Anna Prugova
Goalies
Katie Vaughan
Referee:
Marie Picavet (FRA)
Linesmen:
Lorna Beresford (GBR)
Anne-Ruth Kuonen (SUI)

	0–1	2:24 – A. Difilippo (K. Augustine)
15:36 – M. Kirilenko	1–1
	1–2	19:12 – C. Catlow (M. Korzon)
	1–3	31:08 – M. Sparks
40:27 – M. Kirilenko (Y. Dyupina)	2–3
	2–4	57:44 – K. Augustine (H. Williams)

6 min
Penalties
4 min
35
Shots
24

December 10, 2013; 20:00	Spain	0–21 (0–6, 0–7, 0–8)	Canada	Ice Stadium, Pergine Valsugana; Attendance: 140

Game reference

Carlota Alvarado
Oihane Tedone
Goalies
Élodie Rousseau-Sirois
Referee:
Malja Kontturi (FIN)
Linesmen:
Jenna Puhakka (FIN)
Svenja Strohmenger (GER)

0–1	0:35 – G. Davidson (K. Deschênes, J. Legault)
0–2	1:39 – L. Brooker
0–3	3:09 – J. Legault (B. Fouracres, G. Davidson)
0–4	16:39 – L. Brooker (M. McHaffie, A. Normore)
0–5	19:32 – K. Clement-Heydra
0–6	19:49 – J. Pinkerton (A. Parkins, K. Wong)
0–7	20:44 – G. Davidson (K. Deschênes, C. Capozzi)
0–8	21:19 – J. Pinkerson (C. MacDonald, K. Clement-Heydra)
0–9	22:06 – M. McHaffie (A. Normore, L. Brooker)
0–10	25:11 – L. Brooker (A. Normore, K. Wong)
0–11	33:03 – K. Wong (C. Capozzi)
0–12	34:38 – T. Rafter (C. Wooster)
0–13	39:38 – J. Legault (G. Davidson, K. Deschênes)
0–14	41:22 – A. Parkins (K. Clement-Heydra)
0–15	49:01 – G. Davidson (K. Deschênes, J. Legault)
0–16	51:15 – A. Normore
0–17	52:05 – C. Wooster (B. Fouracres, J. Smith)
0–18	56:30 – G. Davidson (K. Wong, C. Capozzi)
0–19	57:58 – K. Clement-Heydra (B. Fouracres)
0–20	59:02 – C. Wooster
0–21	59:25 – J. Smith (C. Wooster)

0 min
Penalties
0 min
2
Shots
80

December 12, 2013; 12:00	Great Britain	1–2 (0–2, 0–0, 1–0)	United States	Ice Stadium, Pergine Valsugana; Attendance: 320

Game reference

Samantha Bolwell
Goalies
Chelsea Corell
Referee:
Katarina Timglas (SWE)
Linesmen:
Anne-Ruth Kuonen (SUI)
Svenja Strohmenger (GER)

	0–1	10:20 – A. Abromson
	0–2	13:40 – R. Weaver (P. Harrington) (PP)
45:20 – S. Allen	1–2

10 min
Penalties
2 min
14
Shots
62

December 12, 2013; 16:00	Canada	5–0 (1–0, 1–0, 3–0)	Russia	Ice Stadium, Pergine Valsugana; Attendance: 145

Game reference

Kelly Campbell
Goalies
Anna Prugova
Referee:
Marie Picavet (FRA)
Linesmen:
Lorna Beresford (GBR)
Jackie Spresser (USA)

5:14 – L. Brooker (A. Normore) (PP)	1–0
21:20 – J. Legault (S. Brault)	2–0
40:45 – A. Parkins (J. Pinkerton, K. Clement-Heydra)	3–0
57:46 – G. Davidson (K. Deschênes, J. Legault)	4–0
58:47 – C. Capozzi (K. Clement-Heydra, A. Normore)	5–0

0 min
Penalties
10 min
56
Shots
10

December 12, 2013; 20:00	Spain	0–6 (0–1, 0–4, 0–1)	Japan	Ice Stadium, Pergine Valsugana; Attendance: 105

Game reference

Carlota Alvarado
Goalies
Hazuki Maeda
Yae Unosawa
Referee:
Maija Kontturi (FIN)
Linesmen:
Anna Hammar (SWE)
Helga Tschorner (ITA)

0–1	13:48 – M. Iwasaki
0–2	22:29 – Y. Ota (M. Iwasaki)
0–3	29:56 – A. Ohashi
0–4	32:00 – T. Kurata (M. Iwasaki) (PP)
0–5	34:40 – M. Yoshida (Y. Ota)
0–6	59:24 – S. Yuyama (M. Morii)

4 min
Penalties
2 min
5
Shots
55

December 13, 2013; 12:00	Canada	13–0 (3–0, 4–0, 6–0)	Great Britain	Ice Stadium, Pergine Valsugana; Attendance: 95

Game reference

Kelly Campbell
Goalies
Nicole Jackson
Referee:
Maija Kontturi (FIN)
Linesmen:
Jenna Puhakka (FIN)
Jackie Spresser (USA)

6:23 – A. Parkins (K. Clement-Heydra, T. Rafter)	1–0
17:26 – T. Rafter (A. Parkins, K. Wong)	2–0
18:21 – A. Parkins (B. Fouracres, K. Clement-Heydra)	3–0
30:04 – G. Davidson (C. Wooster)	4–0
30:51 – A. Normore (C. Capozzi)	5–0
33:44 – C. Wooster (J. Smith)	6–0
35:21 – J. Pinkerton (G. Davidson, B. Fouracres)	7–0
41:26 – K. Deschênes (G. Davidson, J. Legault)	8–0
44:32 – J. Smith (K. Deschênes, C. MacDonald)	9–0
48:30 – G. Davidson (C. Wooster)	10–0
51:11 – J. Smith	11–0
58:44 – T. Rafter (C. Wooster)	12–0
59:41 – G. Davidson (B. Fouracres)	13–0

2 min
Penalties
4 min
94
Shots
1

December 13, 2013; 16:00	Spain	1–15 (0–0, 1–7, 0–8)	Russia	Ice Stadium, Pergine Valsugana; Attendance: 91

Game reference

Carlota Alvarado
Oihane Tedone
Goalies
Anna Prugova
Valentina Ostrovlyanchik
Referee:
Melissa Szkola (USA)
Linesmen:
Anna Nygard (NOR)
Helga Tschorner (ITA)

	0–1	20:39 – E. Markova (O. Afonina) (PP)
	0–2	21:39 – E. Mitrofanova (N. Shiryayeva)
25:32 – L. Abrisqueta (V. Ibanez, I. Senac)	1–2
	1–3	28:12 – M. Kirilenko (O. Afonina, S. Kolmykova)
	1–4	31:06 – S. Kolmykova (O. Afonina)
	1–5	31:22 – Y. Solovyova (Y. Ananina)
	1–6	33:47 – O. Afonina (Y. Ananina)
	1–7	35:07 – Y. Dyupina (SH)
	1–8	40:39 – S. Kolmykova (M. Kirilenko)
	1–9	44:01 – S. Kolmykova (M. Kirilenko)
	1–10	49:09 – O. Afonina
	1–11	49:28 – M. Kirilenko
	1–12	49:39 – Y. Solovyova (K. Sherstyuk)
	1–13	50:12 – Y. Solovyova (Y. Silina)
	1–14	57:51 – Y. Ananina (E. Mitrofanova)
	1–15	58:53 – M. Kirilenko (O. Afonina)

2 min
Penalties
4 min
16
Shots
68

December 13, 2013; 20:00	United States	0–2 (0–1, 0–0, 0–1)	Japan	Ice Stadium, Pergine Valsugana; Attendance: 150

Game reference
Chelsea Corell	Goalies	Hazuki Maeda	Referee: Katarina Timglas (SWE); Linesmen: Lorna Beresford (GBR); Svenja Strohmenger (GER)
0–1 / 14:33 – M. Morii (SH); 0–2 / 54:59 – M. Iwasaki			Referee: Katarina Timglas (SWE); Linesmen: Lorna Beresford (GBR); Svenja Strohmenger (GER)
2 min	Penalties	2 min	Referee: Katarina Timglas (SWE); Linesmen: Lorna Beresford (GBR); Svenja Strohmenger (GER)
20	Shots	32	Referee: Katarina Timglas (SWE); Linesmen: Lorna Beresford (GBR); Svenja Strohmenger (GER)

December 15, 2013; 12:00	Great Britain	2–1 OT (0–0, 1–0, 0–1) (OT: 1–0)	Spain	Ice Stadium, Pergine Valsugana; Attendance: 115

Game reference

Samantha Bolwell
Goalies
Carlota Alvarado
Referee:
Marie Picavet (FRA)
Linesmen:
Anna Nygard (NOR)
Anne-Ruth Kuonen (SUI)

36:54 – S. Allen (M. Petrosino, N. Davies)	1–0
	1–1	51:21 – V. Ibanez (A. Calero)
60:48 – S. Allen	2–1

10 min
Penalties
2 min
30
Shots
27

December 15, 2013; 16:00	Japan	1–5 (0–3, 1–2, 0–0)	Russia	Ice Stadium, Pergine Valsugana; Attendance: 135

Game reference

Yae Unosawa
Hazuki Maeda
Goalies
Anna Prugova
Referee:
Melissa Szkola (USA)
Linesmen:
Jenna Puhakka (FIN)
Helga Tschorner (ITA)

	0–1	1:59 – M. Belova (E. Mitrofanova) (SH)
	0–2	8:38 – A. Shukina (S. Kolmykova)
	0–3	9:06 – S. Kolmykova (M. Kirilenko, O. Afonina)
21:16 – Y. Notoya (A. Ohashi)	1–3
	1–4	22:33 – O. Afonina (M. Kirilenko) (PP)
	1–5	27:36 – S. Kolmykova (M. Kirilenko, Y. Nikolayeva) (PP)

10 min
Penalties
10 min
20
Shots
23

December 15, 2013; 20:00	Canada	9–1 (2–0, 4–0, 3–1)	United States	Ice Stadium, Pergine Valsugana; Attendance: 303

Game reference

Élodie Rousseau-Sirois
Goalies
Katie Vaughan
Referee:
Katarina Timglas (SWE)
Linesmen:
Anna Hammar (SWE)
Jackie Spresser (USA)

7:57 – J. Legault (K. Deschênes, G. Davidson)	1–0
14:17 – T. Rafter (G. Davidson, K. Wong)	2–0
23:54 – J. Legault (A. Normore, C. Wooster)	3–0
26:25 – A. Parkins (T. Rafter, K. Clement-Heydra)	4–0
38:28 – L. Brooker (A. Normore, T. Rafter)	5–0
39:29 – G. Davidson (J. Legault, K. Deschênes)	6–0
49:36 – C. Wooster (K. Clement-Heydra, K. Deschênes)	7–0
	7–1	52:54 – C. Catlow (H. Williams, R. Weaver) (PP)
53:51 – A. Normore (A. Parkins, B. Fouracres)	8–1
57:04 – C. MacDonald (C. Wooster, K. Clement-Heydra)	9–1

2 min
Penalties
6 min
36
Shots
10

December 16, 2013; 12:00	Russia	13–1 (6–1, 4–0, 3–0)	Great Britain	Ice Stadium, Pergine Valsugana; Attendance: 102

Game reference

Valentina Ostrovlyanchik
Anna Prugova
Goalies
Nicole Jackson
Referee:
Katarina Timglas (SWE)
Linesmen:
Anna Nygard (NOR)
Helga Tschorner (ITA)

3:57 – K. Sherstyuk (D. Abdulina)	1–0
	1–1	4:53 – S. Allen (N. Davies)
6:39 – E. Markova (Y. Solovyova)	2–1
9:21 – A. Mishlanova (A. Shukina)	3–1
15:01 – K. Sherstyuk	4–1
17:38 – Y. Nikolayeva (PP)	5–1
19:11 – A. Mishlanova (S. Litvintseva, A. Shukina)	6–1
21:17 – Y. Ananina (O. Afonina)	7–1
24:59 – N. Shiryayeva (Y. Dyupina)	8–1
32:50 – M. Belova (Y. Ananina)	9–1
35:44 – M. Kirilenko	10–1
44:38 – E. Mitrofanova	11–1
44:52 – Y. Dyupina (M. Belova, Y. Ananina)	12–1
57:26 – S. Litvintseva (A. Mishlanova, K. Sherstyuk)	13–1

6 min
Penalties
4 min
73
Shots
9

December 16, 2013; 16:00	Japan	1–9 (0–2, 0–1, 1–6)	Canada	Ice Stadium, Pergine Valsugana; Attendance: 110

Game reference

Hazuki Maeda
Yae Unosawa
Goalies
Élodie Rousseau-Sirois
Referee:
Melissa Szkola (USA)
Linesmen:
Jackie Spresser (USA)
Svenja Strohmenger (GER)

	0–1	12:36 – A. Parkins (J. Smith, J. Legault)
	0–2	13:12 – J. Pinkerton (K. Deschênes, G. Davidson)
	0–3	27:11 – A. Parkins (J. Pinkerton, J. Smith)
	0–4	41:10 – T. Rafter (C. Wooster, K. Clement-Heydra)
	0–5	44:01 – A. Normore (L. Brooker, J. Smith)
	0–6	45:55 – A. Parkins (T. Rafter, K. Clement-Heydra) (PP)
	0–7	46:38 – C. MacDonald (G. Davidson, J. Legault)
	0–8	47:53 – A. Normore (J. Smith, K. Wong)
	0–9	53:51 – G. Davidson (J. Legault, K. Clement-Heydra)
59:14 – A. Ichijo (R. Sakamoto, M. Morii) (PP)	1–9

6 min
Penalties
2 min
9
Shots
52

December 16, 2013; 20:00	United States	8–0 (2–0, 2–0, 4–0)	Spain	Ice Stadium, Pergine Valsugana; Attendance: 120

Game reference

Chelsea Corell
Goalies
Carlota Alvarado
Oihane Tedone
Referee:
Marie Picavet (FRA)
Linesmen:
Lorna Beresford (GBR)
Jenna Puhakka (FIN)

14:47 – C. Catlow (C. Labossiere, R. Weaver)	1–0
17:19 – H. Williams (C. Catlow, R. Weaver) (PP)	2–0
23:08 – K. Augustine	3–0
33:49 – R. Weaver (PP)	4–0
43:50 – R. Weaver (C. Catlow)	5–0
44:35 – S. Burlingame	6–0
44:57 – M. Sparks (A. Abromson, K. Griebe)	7–0
59:16 – M. Korzon (K. Bates)	8–0

4 min
Penalties
4 min
63
Shots
14

=== Playoff round ===
Semifinals
1	Canada	15
4	Japan	0
2	Russia	3*
3	United States	2

Gold Medal
1	Canada	5
2	Russia	0
Bronze Medal
3	United States	3
4	Japan	1

* denotes shootout victory

All times are local (UTC+1).

==== Semifinals ====
December 18, 2013; 16:00	Russia	3–2 SO (1–1, 1–1, 0–0) (OT: 0–0) (SO: 1–0)	United States	Ice Stadium, Pergine Valsugana; Attendance: 160

Game reference

Anna Prugova
Goalies
Katie Vaughan
Referee:
Katarina Timglas (SWE)
Linesmen:
Anna Hammar (SWE)
Anne-Ruth Kuonen (SUI)

	0–1	4:40 – K. Augustine
16:21 – O. Afonina (Y. Nikolayeva) (PP)	1–1
	1–2	27:01 – A. Abromson (M. McGrath, K. Augustine) (PP)
39:46 – Y. Nikolayeva (A. Shukina, S. Kolmykova) (PP)	2–2

A. Shukina
M. Kirilenko
Shootout
(miss) K. Augustine
(miss) H. Williams
20 min
Penalties
14 min
36
Shots
25

December 18, 2013; 20:00	Canada	15–0 (3–0, 5–0, 7–0)	Japan	Ice Stadium, Pergine Valsugana; Attendance: 150

Game reference

Kelly Campbell
Goalies
Yae Unosawa
Hazuki Maeda
Referee:
Maija Kontturi (FIN)
Linesmen:
Jenna Puhakka (FIN)
Helga Tschorner (ITA)

6:39 – J. Legault (C. Capozzi)	1–0
10:02 – G. Davidson (J. Legault, K. Deschênes)	2–0
10:57 – T. Rafter (C. MacDonald, A. Parkins)	3–0
23:41 – G. Davidson	4–0
30:42 – K. Deschênes (C. MacDonald, B. Fouracres) (PP)	5–0
33:33 – K. Deschênes (K. Clement-Heydra, B. Fouracres)	6–0
34:50 – T. Rafter (A. Parkins, C. MacDonald)	7–0
39:29 – B. Fouracres (C. Wooster, J. Pinkerton)	8–0
40:09 – K. Clement-Heydra (B. Fouracres, A. Normore)	9–0
44:09 – G. Davidson (C. Wooster, J. Pinkerton)	10–0
45:51 – K. Clement-Heydra (B. Fouracres, A. Normore)	11–0
52:55 – A. Parkins (A. Normore)	12–0
53:22 – A. Normore (A. Parkins)	13–0
56:30 – A. Normore (A. Parkins)	14–0
58:11 – L. Brooker (J. Smith)	15–0

0 min
Penalties
6 min
50
Shots
8

==== 5th place match ====
December 19, 2013; 16:00	Great Britain	3–1 (3–0, 0–0, 0–1)	Spain	Ice Stadium, Pergine Valsugana; Attendance: 90

Game reference

Nicole Jackson
Goalies
Carlota Alvarado
Referee:
Marie Picavet (FRA)
Linesmen:
Lorna Beresford (GBR)
Anne-Ruth Kuonen (SUI)

3:07 – S. Allen (M. Petrosino, L. Summers)	1–0
6:16 – H. Cornford (S. Allen)	2–0
6:43 – M. Petrosino	3–0
	3–1	53:05 – L. Rebolledo (I. Senac, S. Diez)

12 min
Penalties
12 min
39
Shots
34

==== Bronze medal match ====
December 20, 2013; 16:00	United States	3–1 (1–1, 0–0, 2–0)	Japan	Ice Stadium, Pergine Valsugana; Attendance: 115

Game reference

Katie Vaughan
Goalies
Hazuki Maeda
Referee:
Melissa Szkola (USA)
Linesmen:
Anna Hammar (SWE)
Anna Nygard (NOR)

17:03 – M. Korzon (R. Weaver)	1–0
	1–1	19:49 – R. Sakamoto (S. Kikuchi)
42:30 – K. Augustine (H. Williams, M. McGrath)	2–1
59:57 – H. Williams (C. Catlow) (EN)	3–1

2 min
Penalties
8 min
31
Shots
38

==== Gold medal match ====
December 20, 2013; 20:00	Canada	5–0 (1–0, 2–0, 2–0)	Russia	Ice Stadium, Pergine Valsugana; Attendance: 823

Game reference

Kelly Campbell
Goalies
Anna Prugova
Referee:
Marie Picavet (FRA)
Linesmen:
Jackie Spresser (USA)
Svenja Strohmenger (GER)

11:39 – J. Pinkerton (C. Wooster, C. MacDonald)	1–0
30:24 – J. Smith (L. Brooker, T. Rafter)	2–0
36:53 – K. Clement-Heydra (T. Rafter, J. Smith)	3–0
55:35 – L. Brooker (K. Deschênes, J. Legault)	4–0
56:26 – J. Smith (T. Rafter, G. Davidson)	5–0

4 min
Penalties
12 min
52
Shots
12

=== Final standings ===
1st place, gold medalist(s)	Canada
2nd place, silver medalist(s)	Russia
3rd place, bronze medalist(s)	United States
4	Japan
5	(United Kingdom) Great Britain
6	Spain

=== Scoring leaders ===
List shows the top skaters sorted by points, then goals.

Player	GP	G	A	Pts	+/−	PIM	POS
(Canada) Gabrielle Davidson	7	13	9	22	+26	0	F
(Canada) Katia Clement-Heydra	7	5	13	18	+25	2	F
(Canada) Amanda Parkins	7	9	7	16	+24	2	F
(Canada) Alexa Normore	7	7	9	16	+20	0	F
(Canada) Josianne Legault	7	6	10	16	+21	0	F
(Canada) Tatiana Rafter	7	7	8	15	+20	0	F
(Canada) Cara Wooster	7	4	11	15	+15	0	F
(Canada) Kim Deschênes	7	3	12	15	+22	0	F
(Canada) Jenna Smith	7	5	9	14	+19	4	F
(Russia) Maria Kirilenko	7	6	5	11	+8	2	F
(Canada) Brittney Fouracres	7	1	10	11	+27	0	D
(Canada) Laura Brooker	7	7	3	10	+16	0	F
(Russia) Oxana Afonina	7	4	6	10	+7	2	F
(Canada) Jessica Pinkerton	7	5	4	9	+13	0	F
(Russia) Svetlana Kolmykova	7	5	3	8	+6	0	F
(United States) Ramey Weaver	7	4	4	8	–1	2	F
(Canada) Caitlin MacDonald	7	2	6	8	+22	0	D

GP = Games played; G = Goals; A = Assists; Pts = Points; +/− = Plus/minus; PIM = Penalties in minutes; POS = Position
Source: universiadetrentino.org

=== Leading goaltenders ===
Only the top six goaltenders, based on save percentage, who have played at least 40% of their team's minutes, are included in this list.

Player	TOI	GA	GAA	SA	Sv%	SO
(Canada) Kelly Campbell	240:00	0	0.00	31	100.00	4
(United States) Chelsea Corell	178:14	3	1.01	60	95.00	1
(United Kingdom) Samantha Bolwell	180:48	13	4.31	145	91.03	0
(Canada) Élodie Rousseau-Sirois	180:00	2	0.67	21	90.48	1
(Russia) Anna Prugova	365:00	19	3.12	193	90.16	0
(United States) Katie Vaughan	245:00	15	3.67	145	89.66	0

TOI = Time on ice (minutes:seconds); SA = Shots against; GA = Goals against; GAA = Goals against average; Sv% = Save percentage; SO = Shutouts
Source: universiadetrentino.org

== Medalists ==
Event	Gold	Silver	Bronze
Men	Canada (CAN); 1 Wayne Savage; 2 Michael D'Orazio; 3 Marc-Antoine Desnoyers; 5 Christopher Owens; 7 Chris Culligan (C); 8 Robert Slaney; 9 Eric Faille; 10 Michael Kirkpatrick; 12 Nick MacNeil; 14 Josh Day; 17 Liam Heelis (A); 18 Mathew Maione; 19 P.A. Vandall; 21 Lucas Bloodoff; 23 Chris DeSousa; 24 Alex Wall; 25 Cory Tanaka (A); 26 Tyler Carroll; 27 Simon Lacroix; 28 Mike Cazzola; 30 Anthony Peters; 31 John Groenheyde	Kazakhstan (KAZ); 2 Alexander Lipin (C); 4 Artyom Ignatenko; 5 Leonid Metalnikov; 6 Alexey Grichshenko; 7 Damir Ramazanov; 8 Konstantin Savenkov; 9 Vyacheslav Tryasunov; 10 Vladislav Belan; 12 Viktor Ivashin; 15 Alexandr Kaznacheyev; 16 Nursultan Belgibayev; 17 Alexander Shin; 18 Pavel Zhilin; 19 Alexandr Zubkov; 21 Yevgeniy Rymarev (A); 22 Nikita Kovzalov; 23 Rodion Zharkikh; 24 Alexei Vorontsov (A); 25 Alexey Ishmametyev; 27 Georgi Petrov; 29 Dmitri Malgin; 30 Andrey Yankov	Russia (RUS); 1 Danila Alistratov; 2 Alexander Sumin; 3 Egor Kutugin; 4 Konstantin Fast; 5 Kirill Putilov; 6 Vitali Menshikov; 7 Aleksei Lozhkin; 9 Dmitrii Mikhailov; 11 Konstantin Turukin; 12 Alexander Ugolnikov (A); 14 Kirill Polyanskiy; 15 Pavel Kopytin (A); 16 Yegor Alyoshin; 19 Yury Nazarov; 21 Danil Faizullin; 22 Vadim Mitryakov; 23 Vladislav Sokolov; 24 Alexander Scherbina; 25 Vasily Mordvinov; 27 Andrey Demidov (C); 28 Artem Podshendyalov; 30 Yury Lavretskiy
Women	Canada (CAN); 1 Élodie Rousseau-Sirois; 2 Kimberley Wong; 4 Alexa Normore; 6 Amanda Parkins; 7 Laura Brooker; 8 Jessica Pinkerton; 9 Kim Deschênes (C); 11 Cara Wooster; 12 Caitlin MacDonald (A); 13 Tatiana Rafter; 14 Brittney Fouracres; 15 Gabrielle Davidson; 16 Christina Capozzi; 17 Jenna Pitts; 19 Katia Clement-Heydra (A); 21 Morgan McHaffie; 23 Sophie Brault; 25 Jenna Smith; 28 Josianne Legault; 30 Kelly Campbell	Russia (RUS); 1 Anna Prugova; 2 Elvira Markova; 3 Yulia Sadykova; 4 Yelena Bulatova; 7 Yekaterina Solovyova (A); 8 Maria Belova; 9 Elina Mitrofanova (C); 10 Oxana Afonina; 11 Kristina Sherstyuk; 13 Yekaterina Ananina; 15 Yelena Silina; 16 Maria Kirilenko; 17 Anastasia Mishlanova; 18 Yekaterina Nikolayeva; 19 Svetlana Kolmykova; 20 Valentina Ostrovlyanchik; 21 Anna Shukina; 22 Zoya Polunina (A); 24 Diana Abdulina; 25 Nadezhda Shiryayeva; 28 Yevgenia Dyupina; 29 Svetlana Litvintseva	United States (USA); 1 Katie Vaughan; 2 Paige Harrington (A); 3 Kalli Bates; 4 Lauren Hillberg; 5 Morgan McGrath; 6 Andrea Stewart; 7 Ellen Starkman-Gleason; 8 Caleigh Labossiere; 9 Jennifer Boniecki; 11 Monica Korzon; 12 Kristin Griebe; 14 Amanda Abromson; 15 Jessica Merritt; 16 Hayley Williams (A); 17 Alisha Difilippo; 18 Molly Sparks; 19 Ramey Weaver (C); 21 Sarah Oteri; 22 Staci Burlingame; 23 Cassondra Catlow; 25 Katelyn Augustine; 30 Chelsea Corell

== Medal table ==
Rank	Nation	Gold	Silver	Bronze	Total
1	Canada	2	0	0	2
2	Russia	0	1	1	2
3	Kazakhstan	0	1	0	1
4	United States	0	0	1	1
Totals (4 entries)		2	2	2	6
