= Yuriy Nazarov =

Yuriy Nazarov may refer to:

- Yuriy Nazarov (actor) (born 1937), Russian film and television actor
- Yury Nazarov (born 1992), Russian ice hockey player
