= Shcherbina =

Shcherbina (Ukrainian: Щербина) is a gender-neutral Ukrainian surname. It may refer to

- Alexander Scherbina (born 1988), Russian ice hockey forward
- Boris Shcherbina (1919–1990), Soviet politician, vice-chairman of the Council of Ministers
- Elena Beckman-Shcherbina (1882–1951), Russian pianist and composer
- Grigoriy Shcherbina (1868–1903), Russian diplomat
- Inna Sergeyevna Shcherbina-Samoylova (1922-2003), Russian astronomer and astrophysicist
- Mariya Shcherbina (born 1958), Ukrainian mathematician
- Nikolay Shcherbina (1821–1869), Russian poet
- Vladimir Shcherbina (1907–1978), Soviet geochemist and mineralogist
