= Aleshin =

Aleshin, Alyoshin (Russian: Алёшин) is a Russian surname. Notable people with the surname include:

- Evgeny Aleshin (born 1979), Russian retired swimmer
- Mikhail Aleshin (born 1987), Russian professional racing driver
- Maxim Aleshin, Russian acrobat and former gymnast
- Kirill Aleshin (born 1997), Russian ice dancer
- Yegor Alyoshin (born 1992), Russian professional ice hockey player
