= Stadio del Ghiaccio =

Stadio del Ghiaccio may refer to:

- Stadio Olimpico del Ghiaccio, an open air Figure skating arena in Cortina d'Ampezzo, Italy,
- Stadio del Ghiaccio Gianmario Scola, indoor sporting arena in Canazei, Italy
- Ice Rink Piné, speed skating oval and training facility located in Miola [it], Baselga di Piné, Italy.

== See also ==
- Stadio
