= Yekaterina Ananina =

Russian ice hockey player

Yekaterina Ananina Екатерина Ананьина
- Born: 13 June 1991 (age 35) Yekaterinburg, Russian SFSR, Soviet Union
- Height: 174 cm (5 ft 9 in)
- Weight: 65 kg (143 lb; 10 st 3 lb)
- Position: Forward
- Shoots: Left
- ZhHL team Former teams: Torpedo Nizhny Novgorod: SKIF Nizhny Novgorod; SKSO Yekaterinburg; Agidel Ufa; Fakel Chelyabinsk
- National team: Russia
- Playing career: 2009–present
Medal record
World Championship
Bronze medal – third place	2013 Canada
Universiade
Gold medal – first place	2015 Spain	Ice hockey
Silver medal – second place	2013 Italy	Ice hockey

Yekaterina Igorevna Ananina (Russian: Екатерина Игоревна Ананьина, also romanized Ananyina; born 13 June 1991) is a Russian ice hockey forward, currently playing in the Zhenskaya Hockey League (ZhHL) with Torpedo Nizhny Novgorod.

== International career ==
Ananina was selected for the Russia national women's ice hockey team in the 2010 Winter Olympics. She played in all five games, but did not record a point.

Ananina has also appeared for Russia at three IIHF Women's World Championships. Her first appearance came in 2009. She was a member of the team that won a bronze medal at the 2013 IIHF Women's World Championship.

She also competed in two junior tournaments for the Russia women's national under-18 ice hockey team, in the inaugural event in 2008 and in 2009.

== Career statistics ==
=== International career ===
Year	Team	Event	GP	G	A	Pts	PIM
2008	Russia U18	U18	5	1	0	1	2
2009	Russia U18	U18	5	3	0	3	0
2009	Russia	WW	4	1	1	2	2
2010	Russia	Oly	5	0	0	0	0
2012	Russia	WW	5	0	0	0	4
2013	Russia	WW	6	0	0	0	0
