= HC Fassa Falcons =

Fassa Falcons
- City: Canazei, Italy
- Founded: 1955; 71 years ago
- Home arena: Stadio del Ghiaccio Gianmario Scola
- Colours: Blue, white
- Head coach: Marco Liberatore
- Website: fassafalcons.com

Franchise history
- 1955–1985: Hockey Club Canazel
- 1985–2015: HC Fassa
- 2015–present: Fassa Falcons

HC Fassa Falcons, previously known as HC Fassa, is an ice hockey team from Canazei, Italy. Between 2016 and 2024, they played in the Alps Hockey League, and previously also played in the top division of Italian ice hockey, the Serie A.

The club was founded as Hockey Club Canazei in 1955.
