= Kim Deschênes =

Canadian ice hockey player

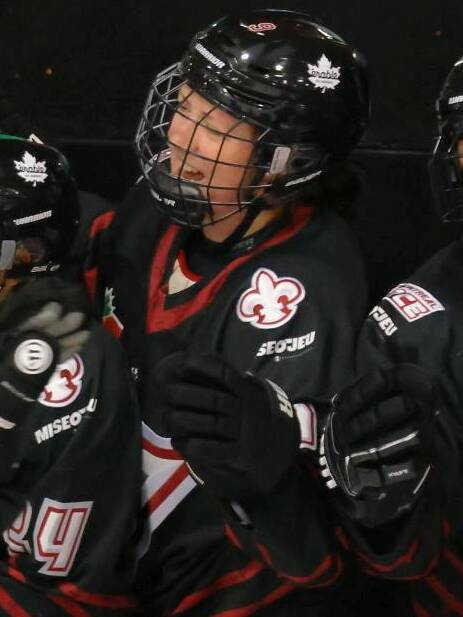
- Deschênes with the Montreal Force in 2022
- Born: August 7, 1991 (age 35) St-Quentin, New Brunswick, Canada
- Height: 5 ft 10 in (178 cm)
- Weight: 159 lb (72 kg; 11 st 5 lb)
- Position: Forward
- Shoots: Right
- PWHPA team Former teams: Montreal Force; Canadiennes de Montreal; Montreal Carabins
- Playing career: 2010–present
Medal record
Women's ice hockey
Representing Canada
Winter Universiade
Gold medal – first place	2011 Russia	Tournament
Gold medal – first place	2013 Italy	Tournament

Kim Deschênes (born August 7, 1991) is a Canadian ice hockey player who was mostly recently signed to the Montreal Force of the now defunct Premier Hockey Federation. She played five seasons with the Canadiennes de Montreal of the Canadian Women's Hockey League (CWHL), until the league ceased operations in 2019.

== Playing career ==
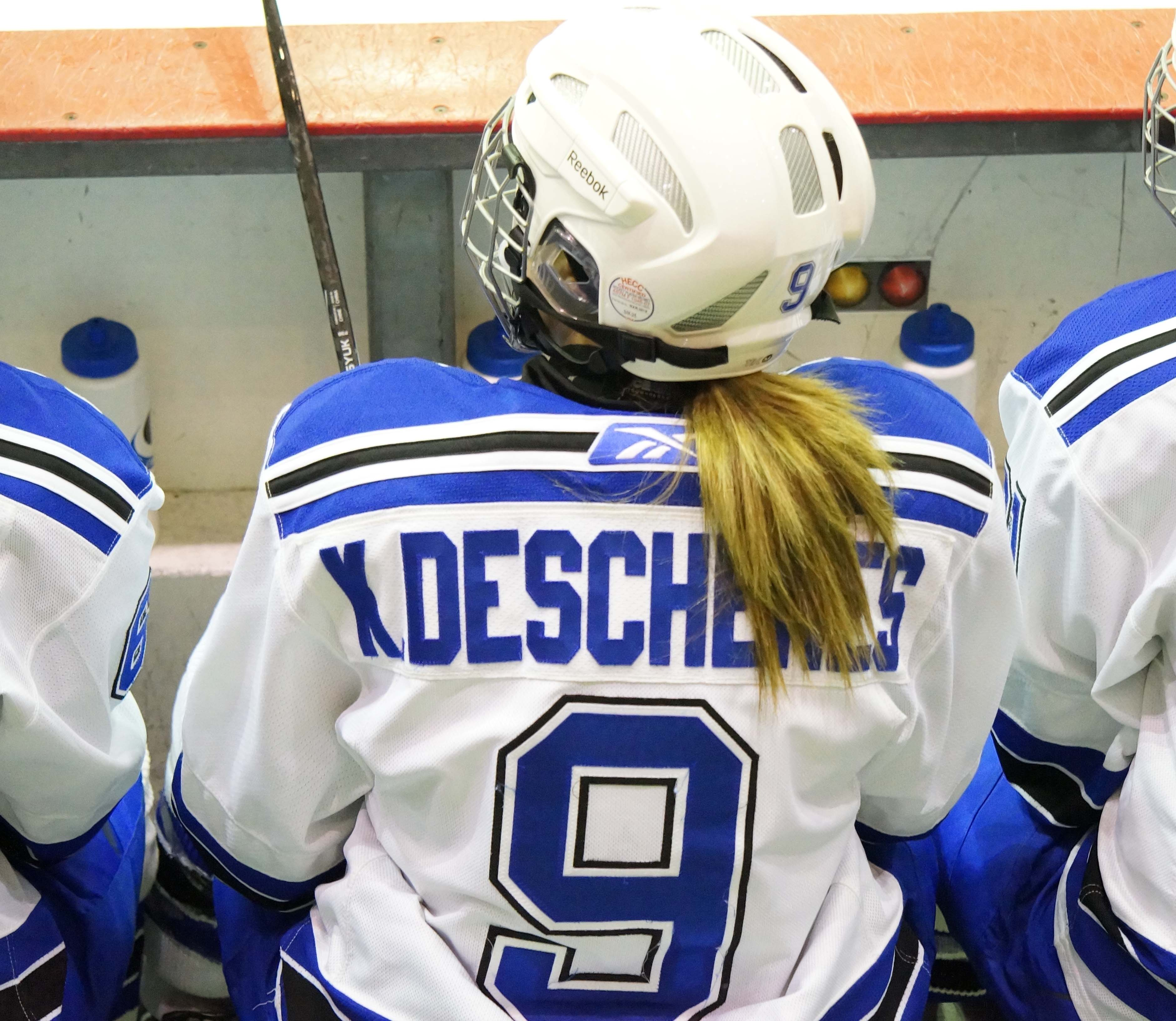
Deschênes with the Montréal Carabins in 2012

For five seasons, Deschênes competed with the Montreal Carabins women's ice hockey program in Canadian Interuniversity Sport play, capturing a national championship 2012.

=== CWHL ===
Selected in the first round of the 2014 CWHL Draft, Deschênes participated in the 2nd Canadian Women's Hockey League All-Star Game, which both took place at Toronto's Air Canada Centre. On December 31, 2015, Kim Deschênes and the Canadiennes participated in an outdoor women's ice hockey game against the NWHL's Boston Pride. Known as the 2016 Outdoor Women's Classic it was the first-ever professional women's ice hockey outdoor game. Deschênes would score the first goal of the game.

Deschênes scored a goal as a member of Team Black in the 2nd Canadian Women's Hockey League All-Star Game. She would also appear with Les Canadiennes in the finals of the 2016 Clarkson Cup.

=== International play ===
Deschênes participated with Canada in the women's ice hockey tournaments at the 2011 and 2013 Winter Universiade, capturing a gold medal in both events. Among the players named to the 2013 roster, Deschênes was the only returning player from the 2011 team. For the 2013 team, Deschênes was also named as the captain of the Canadian team.

== Awards and honors ==
- 2011-12 RSEQ Second-Team All-Star
