= Anna Prugova =

Russian ice hockey goaltender

Anna Prugova Анна Пругова
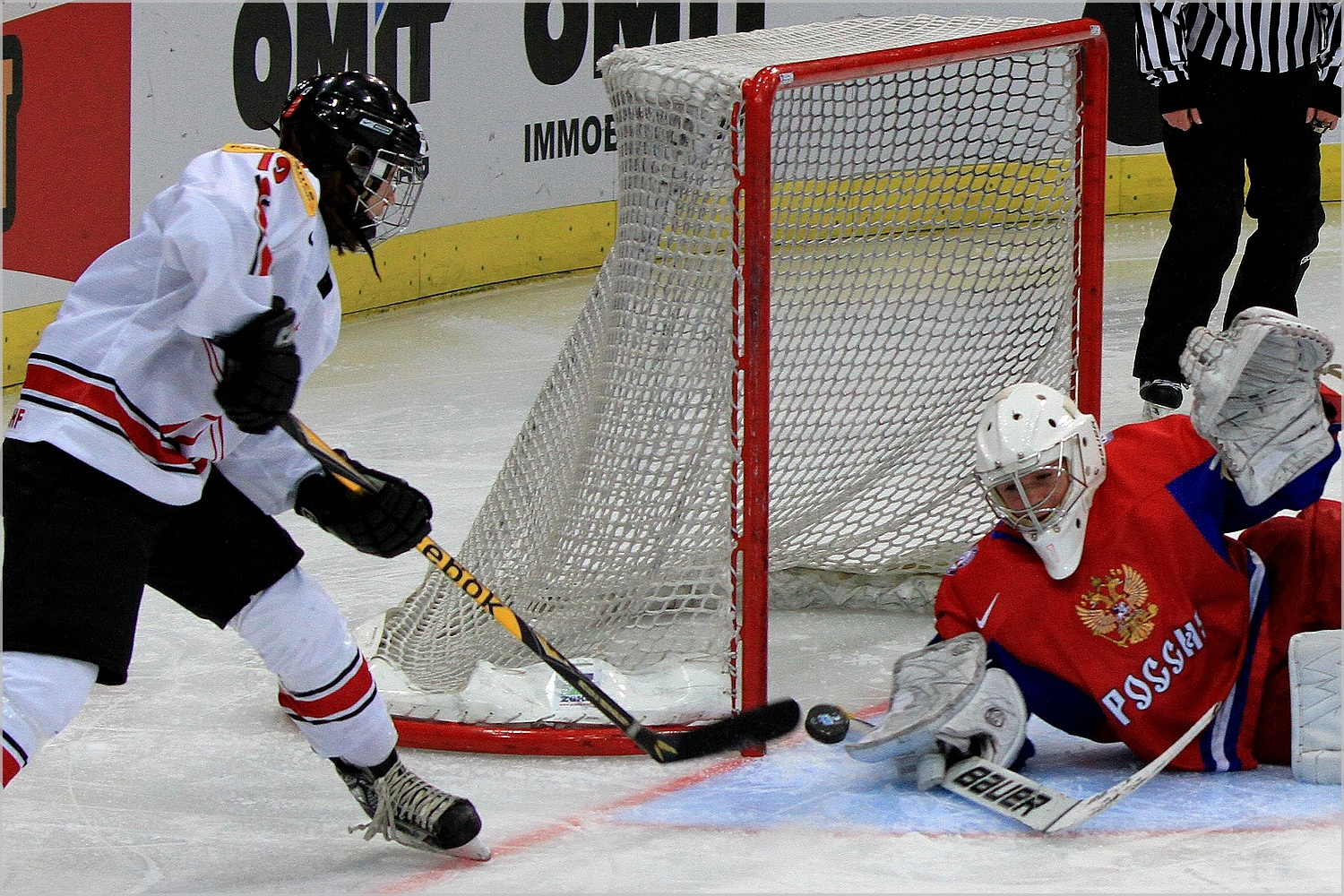
- Born: 20 November 1993 (age 32) Khabarovsk, Russia
- Height: 1.74 m (5 ft 9 in)
- Weight: 65 kg (143 lb; 10 st 3 lb)
- Position: Goaltender
- Catches: Left
- ZhHL team Former teams: Agidel Ufa; Dinamo St. Petersburg; Tornado Moscow Region
- National team: Russia
- Playing career: 2009–present
Medal record
World Championship
Bronze medal – third place	2013 Canada
Bronze medal – third place	2016 Canada
Universiade
Silver medal – second place	2013 Trentino	Ice hockey

Anna Aleksandrovna Prugova (Russian: Анна Александровна Пругова; born 20 November 1993) is a Russian ice hockey player and member of the Russian national ice hockey team, currently playing in the Zhenskaya Hockey League (ZhHL) with Agidel Ufa.

A two-time Olympian, she represented Russia in the women's ice hockey tournaments at the Winter Olympic Games in 2010 and 2014. During the 2010 Winter Olympics, Prugova was the youngest woman competing in ice hockey, aged 16 years and 86 days.

She has participated in six IIHF Women's World Championships, winning bronze medals at the 2013 and 2016 tournaments, and won silver with the Russian team in the women's ice hockey tournament at the 2013 Winter Universiade.

== Career statistics ==
Year	Team	Event	Result	GP	W	L	T/OT	MIN	GA	SO	GAA	SV%
2010	Russia	OG	6th	1	0	1	0	31:00	10	0	19.35	0.615
2014	Russia	OG	DSQ	5	2	2	0	265:46	9	0	2.03	0.914
