= Elina Mitrofanova =

Russian ice hockey player

Elina Mitrofanova Элина Митрофанова
- Born: 28 January 1992 (age 34) Bolshoy Istok, Sysertsky District, Russia
- Height: 5 ft 5 in (165 cm)
- Weight: 126 lb (57 kg; 9 st 0 lb)
- Position: Forward
- Shoots: Right
- ZhHL team: Agidel Ufa
- National team: Russia
- Playing career: 2013–present
Medal record
World Championship
Bronze medal – third place	2016 Canada
Universiade
Gold medal – first place	2017 Aisulu-Almaty	Ice hockey
Gold medal – first place	2015 Granada	Ice hockey
Silver medal – second place	2013 Trentino	Ice hockey

Elina Sergeyevna Mitrofanova (Russian: Элина Сергеевна Митрофанова; born 28 January 1992) is a Russian ice hockey player, currently playing with HC Agidel Ufa of the Zhenskaya Hockey League (ZhHL).

She represented Russia at the IIHF Women's World Championships in 2016 and 2017, and medaled at three Winter Universiades, winning silver in 2013 and gold in 2015 and 2017. As a junior player, she was a member of the Russian national under-18 ice hockey team and participated in the IIHF Women's U18 World Championships in 2008, 2009, and 2010.
