= Tatiana Rafter =

Canadian ice hockey player

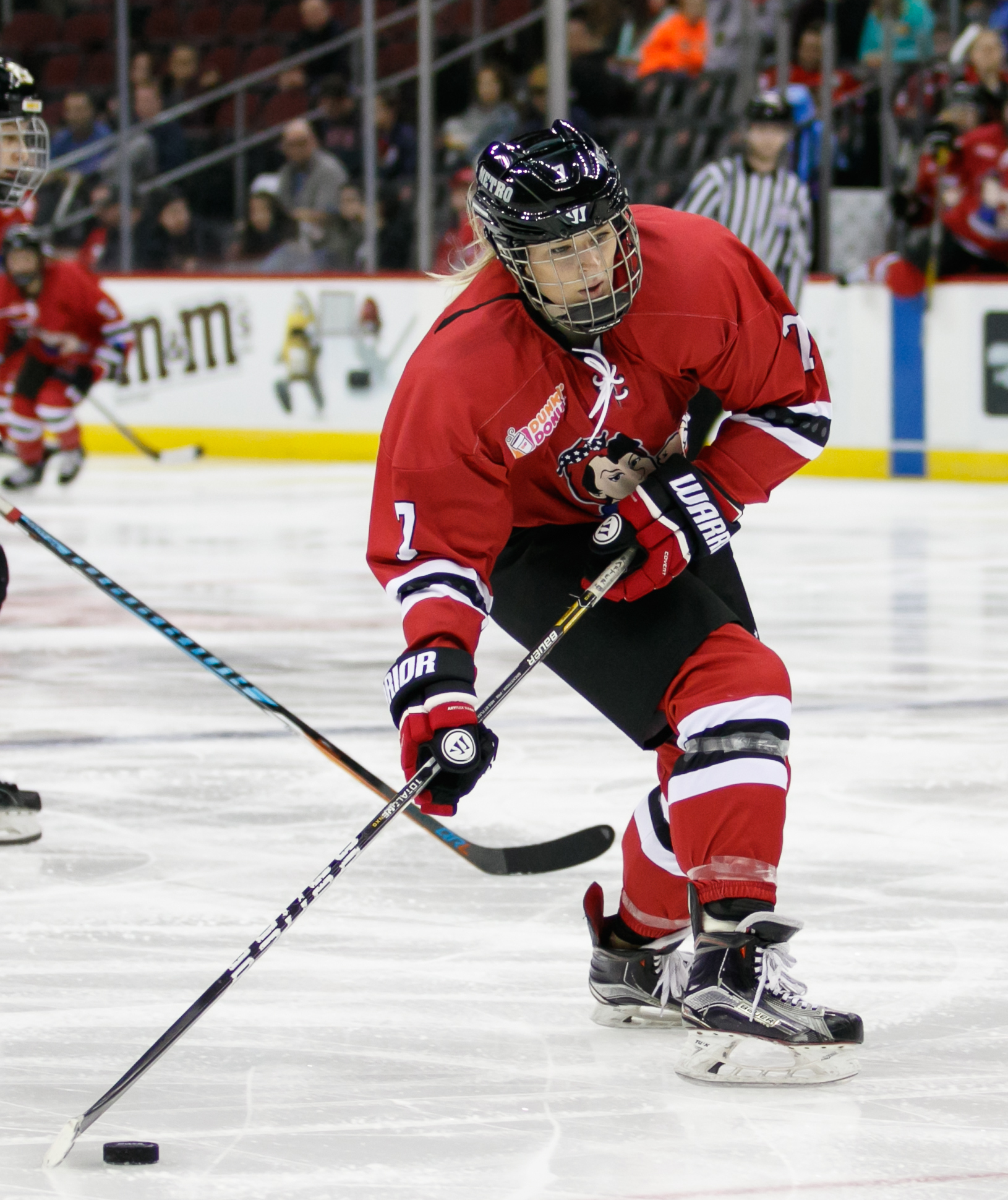
- Born: February 27, 1992 (age 34) Winnipeg, Manitoba, Canada
- Height: 5 ft 9 in (175 cm)
- Weight: 163 lb (74 kg; 11 st 9 lb)
- Position: Forward
- Shot: Right
- Played for: Hvidovre IK; SK Gorny Ukhta; Metropolitan Riveters; Buffalo Beauts; UBC Thunderbirds
- Playing career: 2010–2020
Medal record
Representing Canada
Women's ice hockey
Universiade
Gold medal – first place	2013 Trentino

Tatiana Rafter (born February 27, 1992) is a Canadian ice hockey coach and retired forward. During her playing career, she played in the European Women's Hockey League (EWHL), the Zhenskaya Hockey League (ZhHL), and the National Women's Hockey League (NWHL).

== Career ==
From 2010 to 2015, she attended the University of British Columbia (UBC) and played with the UBC Thunderbirds of Canada West, notching 116 points in 129 U Sports games. In 2014, she became the first UBC player in history to be named Canada West Player of the Year.

After graduating, she initially held conversations with the Calgary Inferno of the Canadian Women's Hockey League about playing with the team, however, when the NWHL was formed that summer, she took the chance to join the new league and signed with the Buffalo Beauts. She scored 3 points in 18 games in her rookie professional season. Although she didn't attend the game as a player, she served as Master of Ceremonies for the Skills Competition of the 1st NWHL All-Star Game.

After one year in Buffalo, she signed with the New York Riveters. She would more than double her point production in the 2016–17 season, up to 7 points in 18 games. She stayed with the Riveters for the 2017–18 season, winning the Isobel Cup with the team.

Ahead of the 2018–19 season, she left the NWHL with the intention of joining the CWHL, hoping to make a push to make the Canadian national team roster for the 2022 Winter Olympics. However, she would end up moving to Russia, signing with SK Gorny of the ZhHL. She scored 21 points in 31 games in her debut ZhHL season, third on the team in scoring and was named to the 2019 ZhHL All-Star Game.

In 2019, she was named head coach of the Hvidovre IK women's team in Denmark. While serving as the club's head coach, she would make a handful of appearances, notably scoring four goals in six EWHL games during the 2019–20 season.

After the end of the season, she retired from professional play and returned to Canada, back to her native city of Winnipeg. She currently serves as head coach of the Interlake Lightning girls' U18 AAA team.

== International career ==
Rafter represented Canada at the 2013 Winter Universiade, scoring 15 points in 7 games as the country won gold, good for sixth in tournament in scoring.

== Awards and honors ==
- 2012-13 Canada West Second-Team All-Star

== Personal life ==
In December 2015, she hosted a charity shinny game along with her brother, Maverick, in order to raise funds for Manitoban junior player Braden Pettinger, who had been paralysed after suffering an injury in an MJHL match in November.

She has a tattoo on her ankle of an arch of seven stars and a crown, matching the Beauts' logo, to commemorate her role as one of the original NWHL players.
