= Vitali Menshikov =

Russian ice hockey player

- Born: 15 July 1989 (age 37) Chelyabinsk, Russian SFSR, Soviet Union
- Height: 6 ft 2 in (188 cm)
- Weight: 205 lb (93 kg; 14 st 9 lb)
- Position: Defence
- Shot: Left
- Played for: Metallurg Serov; Inkvoy Sovetsky; Zauralie Kurgan; CSK VVS Samara; HC Ryazan; Ariada-Akpars Volzhsk; Neftyanik Almetyevsk; Sokol Krasnoyarsk; Avtomobilist Yekaterinburg; Burevestnik Ekaterinburg; Kazzinc-Torpedo; Sibir Novosibirsk; Avangard Omsk; Dynamo Moscow; Traktor Chelyabinsk; Metallurg Magnitogorsk; Graz99ers; Admiral Vladivostok; Jokerit; HC Vityaz
- Playing career: 2010–2023

Vitali Menshikov (born 15 July 1989) is a Russian professional ice hockey player. A defenceman, he is currently an unrestricted free agent who most recently played with HC Vityaz of the Kontinental Hockey League (KHL).

Menshikov made his KHL debut playing with Avtomobilist Yekaterinburg during the 2012–13 KHL season.

== Career statistics ==
			Regular season					Playoffs
Season	Team	League	GP	G	A	Pts	PIM	GP	G	A	Pts	PIM
2004–05	Traktor Chelyabinsk-2	Russia3	1	0	0	0	2	—	—	—	—	—
2005–06	Traktor Chelyabinsk-2	Russia3	8	2	1	3	2	—	—	—	—	—
2007–08	Traktor Chelyabinsk-2	Russia3	32	5	11	16	30	—	—	—	—	—
2007–08	Metallurg Serov	Russia2	17	0	0	0	2	—	—	—	—	—
2007–08	Inkvoy Sovetsky	Russia4	—	—	—	—	—	—	—	—	—	—
2008–09	Traktor Chelyabinsk-2	Russia3	21	4	7	11	22	—	—	—	—	—
2008–09	Zauralie Kurgan	Russia2	17	1	0	1	10	—	—	—	—	—
2009–10	CSK VVS Samara	Russia2	40	2	8	10	83	—	—	—	—	—
2009–10	HC Ryazan	Russia2	6	0	1	1	6	7	0	1	1	8
2010–11	Ariada-Akpars Volzhsk	VHL	8	1	1	2	6	—	—	—	—	—
2010–11	Zauralie Kurgan	VHL	10	0	2	2	31	4	0	0	0	4
2011–12	Neftyanik Almetyevsk	VHL	31	2	3	5	73	—	—	—	—	—
2011–12	Sokol Krasnoyarsk	VHL	19	2	2	4	26	—	—	—	—	—
2012–13	Avtomobilist Yekaterinburg	KHL	9	0	0	0	0	—	—	—	—	—
2012–13	Burevestnik Ekaterinburg	Russia3	12	6	3	9	62	—	—	—	—	—
2012–13	Sokol Krasnoyarsk	VHL	17	1	2	3	8	—	—	—	—	—
2013–14	Kazzinc-Torpedo	VHL	50	12	13	25	52	6	1	0	1	10
2014–15	HC Sibir Novosibirsk	KHL	25	0	2	2	38	15	0	1	1	8
2015–16	HC Sibir Novosibirsk	KHL	57	2	16	18	53	8	0	2	2	12
2016–17	HC Sibir Novosibirsk	KHL	24	1	3	4	42	—	—	—	—	—
2016–17	Avangard Omsk	KHL	16	1	1	2	21	11	1	0	1	14
2017–18	Avangard Omsk	KHL	48	2	5	7	53	2	0	0	0	2
2018–19	HC Dynamo Moscow	KHL	54	2	3	5	58	9	0	1	1	5
2019–20	Traktor Chelyabinsk	KHL	55	1	8	9	80	—	—	—	—	—
2020–21	HC Sibir Novosibirsk	KHL	12	1	1	2	4	—	—	—	—	—
2020–21	Metallurg Magnitogorsk	KHL	2	0	0	0	0	—	—	—	—	—
2020–21	Graz 99ers	ICEHL	10	2	1	3	2	—	—	—	—	—
2021–22	Admiral Vladivostok	KHL	5	0	2	2	0	—	—	—	—	—
2021–22	Jokerit	KHL	6	0	0	0	4	—	—	—	—	—
2022–23	HC Vityaz	KHL	1	0	0	0	0	—	—	—	—	—
KHL totals			314	10	41	51	353	45	1	4	5	41
VHL totals			135	18	23	41	196	10	1	0	1	14
