= Jiří Ondráček =

Czech ice hockey player

- Born: June 3, 1988 (age 36); Havířov, Czechoslovakia
- Height: 6 ft 1 in (185 cm)
- Weight: 161 lb (73 kg; 11 st 7 lb)
- Position: Forward
- Shoots: Right
- Czech Extraliga team: HC Zlín
- Playing career: 2007–present

Jiří Ondráček (born June 3, 1988) is a Czech professional ice hockey player. He played with HC Zlín in the Czech Extraliga during the 2010–11 Czech Extraliga season.
