= Konstantin Turukin =

Russian ice hockey player (born 1990)

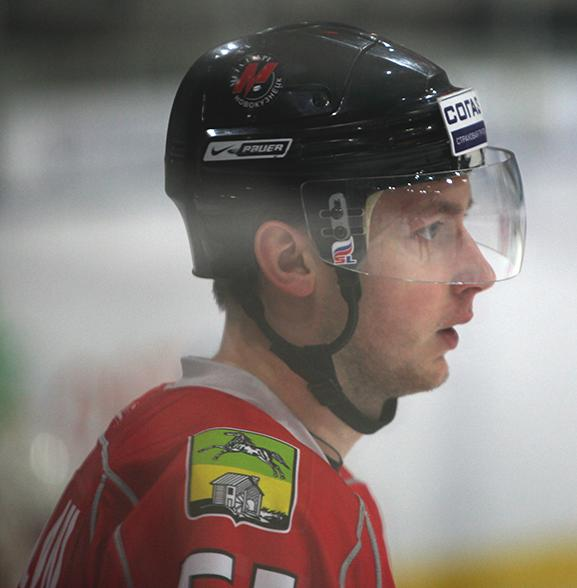
- Konstantin Turukin, 2013
- Born: September 28, 1990 (age 34); Novokuznetsk, Russia
- Height: 5 ft 9 in (175 cm)
- Weight: 168 lb (76 kg; 12 st 0 lb)
- Position: Forward
- Shoots: Left
- KHL team: Metallurg Novokuznetsk
- NHL draft: Undrafted
- Playing career: 2009–present

Konstantin Turukin (born September 28, 1990) is a Russian professional ice hockey player. He is currently playing with Metallurg Novokuznetsk of the Kontinental Hockey League (KHL)

Turukin made his Kontinental Hockey League debut playing with Metallurg Novokuznetsk during the 2009–10 KHL season.
