= Danila Alistratov =

Russian ice hockey player (born 1990)

- Born: October 30, 1990 (age 34); Chelyabinsk, USSR
- Height: 5 ft 7 in (170 cm)
- Weight: 149 lb (68 kg; 10 st 9 lb)
- Position: Goaltender
- Catches: Left
- KHL team: Traktor Chelyabinsk
- NHL draft: Undrafted
- Playing career: 2007–present

Danila Viktorovich Alistratov (Russian: Данила Викторович Алистратов; born October 30, 1990) is a Russian ice hockey goaltender. He has played for Traktor Chelyabinsk and is currently on a try-out contract with the Manchester Monarchs of the ECHL

== Career statistics ==
=== Regular season ===
Season	Team	League	GP	W	L	OTL	MIN	GA	SO	GAA	SV%
2007–08	Traktor Chelyabinsk	RSL	18	—	—	—	—	—	—	3.29	—
2008–09	Traktor Chelyabinsk	KHL	39	17	16	3	2068	94	2	2.73	.894
2009–10	Traktor Chelyabinsk	KHL	40	13	17	4	2063	105	2	3.05	.897
2010–11	Traktor Chelyabinsk	KHL	23	7	9	7	1103	60	1	2.61	.889
KHL Totals			102	37	42	14	5234	259	5	2.80	.893

=== Playoffs ===
Season	Team	League	GP	W	L	MIN	GA	SO	GAA	SV%
2007–08	Traktor Chelyabinsk	RSL	3	—	—	—	—	—	5.04	—
2008–09	Traktor Chelyabinsk	KHL	3	0	3	128	9	0	4.22	.866
2009–10	Traktor Chelyabinsk	KHL	3	1	1	146	6	0	2.46	.919
KHL Totals			6	1	4	274	15	0	3.28	.893

=== International ===
Year	Team	Event	GP	W	L	T	MIN	GA	SO	GAA	SV%
2008	Russia	WJC18	3	2	1	0	144	7	0	2.91	.870
2009	Russia	WJC	3	2	1	0	137	7	0	3.05	.829
Junior int'l totals			6	4	2	0	281	14	0	2.98	.850
