= Alexander Lipin =

Kazakhstani ice hockey player

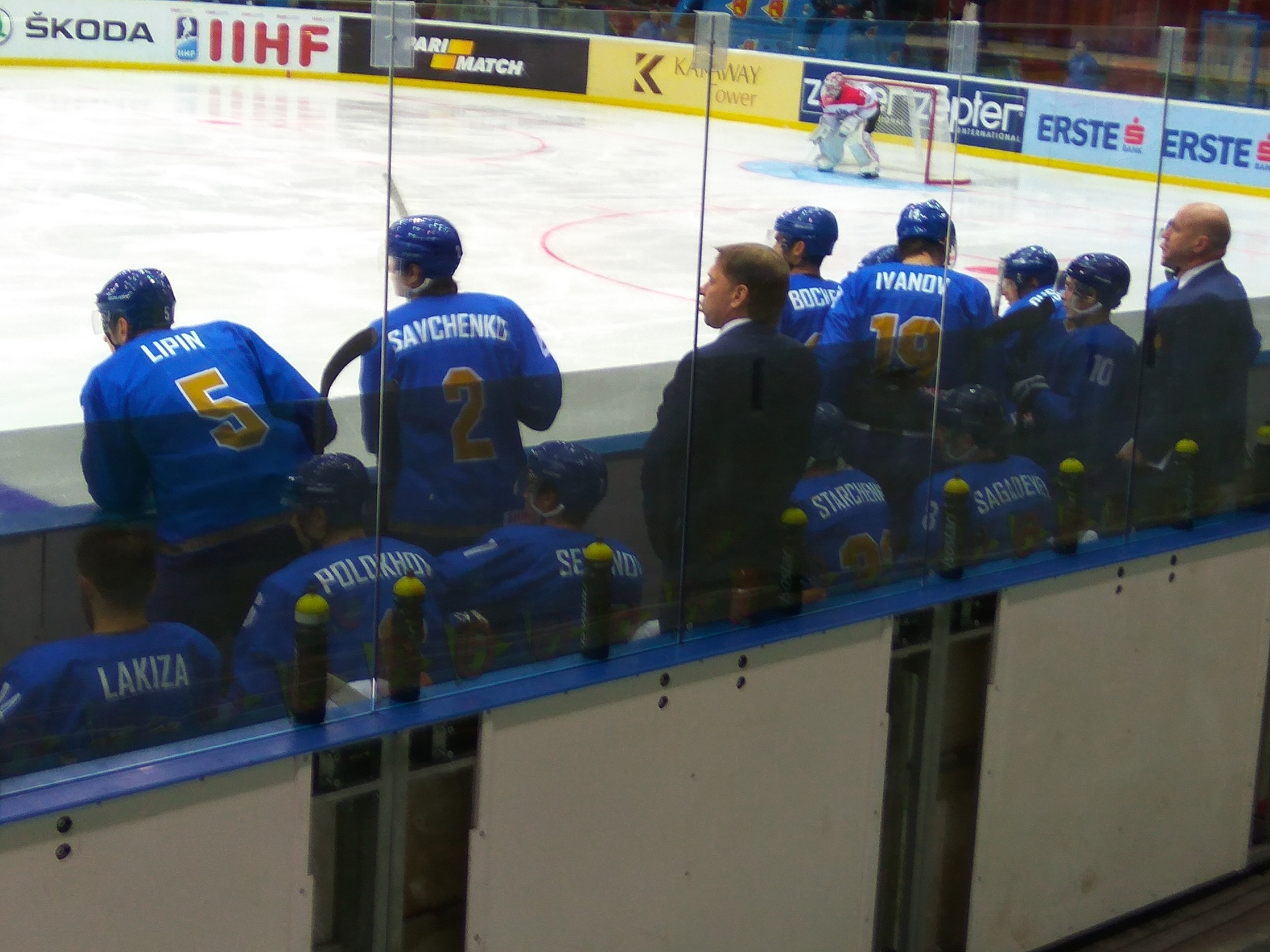
- The match between Kazakhstan and Austria at the 2017 IIHF World Championship Division I. Lipin can be seen wearing the #5 shirt in the above image.
- Born: 10 December 1985 (age 40) Ust-Kamenogorsk, Kazakh SSR, Soviet Union
- Height: 6 ft 2 in (188 cm)
- Weight: 236 lb (107 kg; 16 st 12 lb)
- Position: Defenceman
- Shoots: Left
- KHC team Former teams: Yertis Pavlodar; Barys Astana
- National team: Kazakhstan
- Playing career: 2004–present

Alexander Gennadievich Lipin (Russian: Александр Геннадьевич Липин; born 10 December 1985) is a Kazakhstani professional ice hockey defenceman who currently plays with Yertis Pavlodar and Nomad Astana of the Kazakhstan Hockey Championship. He has formerly played Barys Astana in the Kontinental Hockey League (KHL).
