= Dmytro Isaienko =

Ukrainian politician

- Дмитро Ісаєнко
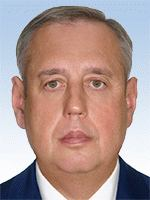

People's Deputy of Ukraine
- Incumbent
- Assumed office 29 August 2019

Personal details
- Born: Dmytro Isaienko; 30 August 1967 (age 59)
- Party: Opposition Platform — For Life

Dmytro Valeriiovych Isaienko (Ukrainian: Дмитро Валерійович Ісаєнко; born on August 30, 1967) is a Ukrainian politician. He served as People's Deputy of Ukraine of the IXth convocation.

== Early life ==
Dmytro Valeriiovych Isaienko was born in Rechytsa, Gomel Oblast, Belarus.

From 1984 to 1989 he attended Leningrad Higher Military Engineering Construction School. He graduated from Leningrad Higher Military Engineering-Technical University (1989) with the a specialty of a heat and power engineer.

== Career ==
From 1989 to 1999 he worked in various positions for Assembly assembly party 241 in Balaklava. From 1999 to 2007 he served in multiple positions at the Central Specialized Building Administration of the Ukraine Ministry of Defence. From 2007 to 2015 he worked as a deputy of the Secretary of Regional Development and Building of Ukraine in Kyiv. He supervised the building of defensive constructions in Donetsk and Luhansk Oblast. On January 14, 2015 he retired from government service. Thereafter he served as vice-president of Ukraine's Builders Confederation. On June 20, 2019 he earned a Doctor of Science at Kyiv National University of Construction and Architecture and defended a thesis on specialty Projects and Programs Administration.

== Politics ==
On August 29, 2019 he became a People's Deputy of Ukraine in the IXth convocation. He was a member of the Opposition Platform — For Life. He joined a party parliamentary faction at the Verkhovna Rada of Ukraine. He served as Secretary of the Verkhovna Rada of Ukraine Committee on State Building, Local Governance, Regional and Urban Development.

== Recognition ==
- Mark of the President of Ukraine «Medal "For Irreproachable Service" 3rd Class (1998)
- 0 Years of Armed Forces of Ukraine (2001)
- Merited Builder of Ukraine (2009)
- Merited Worker in Building and Architecture» 2nd Class (2010)
- Certificate of Merit of Kyiv Major (2010)
- , Award Pin of Minregion «Badge» (2013)
