= Pavel Kopytin =

Russian ice hockey player

- Born: March 17, 1987 (age 38); Lipetsk, Russia
- Height: 6 ft 2 in (188 cm)
- Weight: 170 lb (77 kg; 12 st 2 lb)
- Position: Forward
- Shoots: Right
- VHL team Former teams: Saryarka Karaganda; Atlant Moscow Oblast; Sibir Novosibirsk
- Playing career: 2010–present

Pavel Kopytin (born March 17, 1987) is a Russian professional ice hockey player. He is currently playing with Saryarka Karaganda of the Supreme Hockey League (VHL).

Kopytin made his Kontinental Hockey League (KHL) debut playing with Atlant Moscow Oblast during the 2013–14 KHL season.
