= Simon Kostner =

Italian ice hockey player

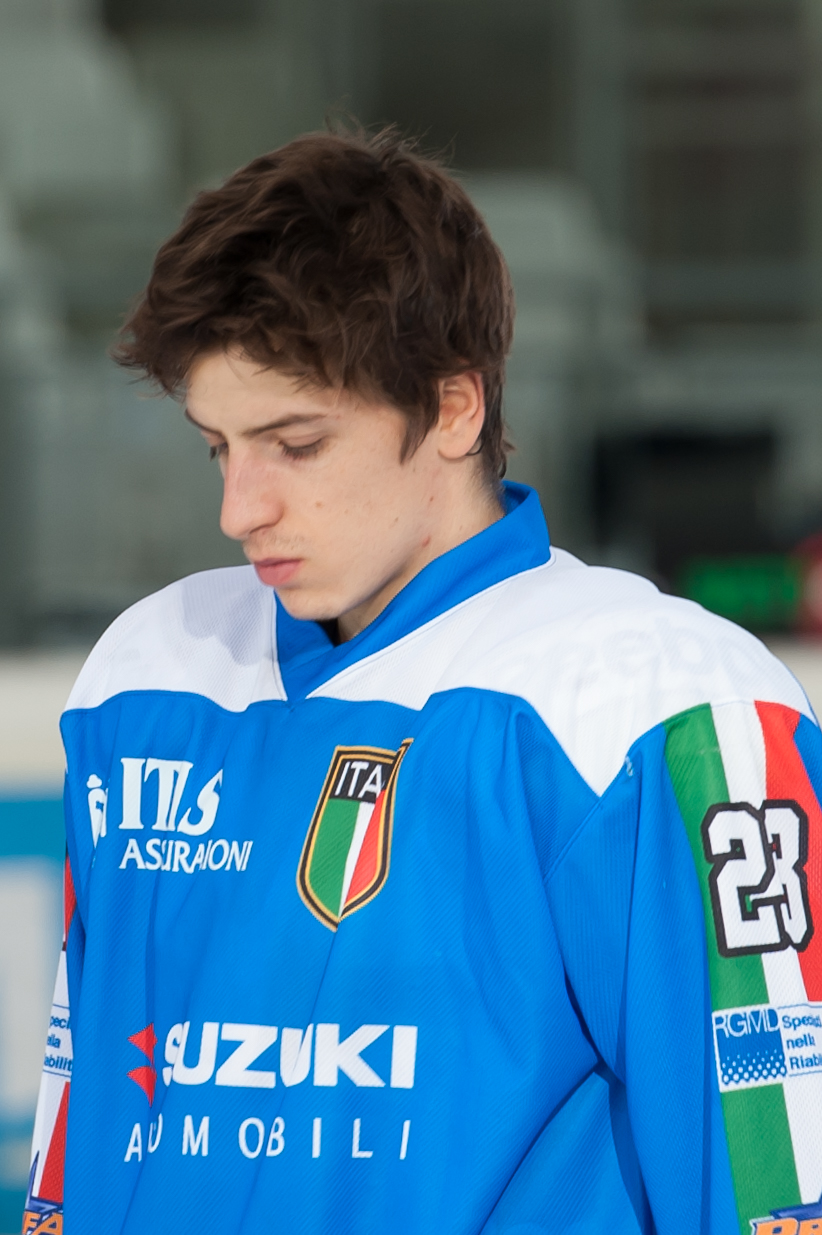
- Kostner in 2015
- Born: 30 November 1990 (age 34); Bolzano, Italy
- Height: 172 cm (5 ft 8 in)
- Weight: 77 kg (170 lb; 12 st 2 lb)
- Position: Forward
- Shoots: Right
- AlpsHL team Former teams: Ritten Sport; JYP Jyväskylä
- National team: Italy
- Playing career: 2011–present

Simon Kostner (born 30 November 1990) is an Italian ice hockey forward playing for Ritten Sport of the Alps Hockey League.

== International play ==
Kostner has represented the Italian national team in several tournaments. His first International Ice Hockey Federation (IIHF)-sanctioned event was the 2007 World U18 Championships Division I. Italy placed fourth in the Group A tournament while Kostner recorded one assist in five games. He returned the following year to the 2008 Division I tournament; playing in Group A Italy finished fourth again and Kostner, serving as captain, had 7 points in 5 games.

He would play in three World Junior Championships: the 2008 Division II, the 2009 Division I, and the 2010 Division I tournaments.

== Personal life ==
Kostner was born in Bolzano, and grew up in Northern Italy. He comes from a family of winter athletes: his father, Erwin Kostner, played ice hockey at the 1984 Winter Olympics for Italy, while his sister, Carolina Kostner, is a figure skater who won a bronze medal at the 2014 Winter Olympics.
