= Patrik Poulíček =

Czech ice hockey player

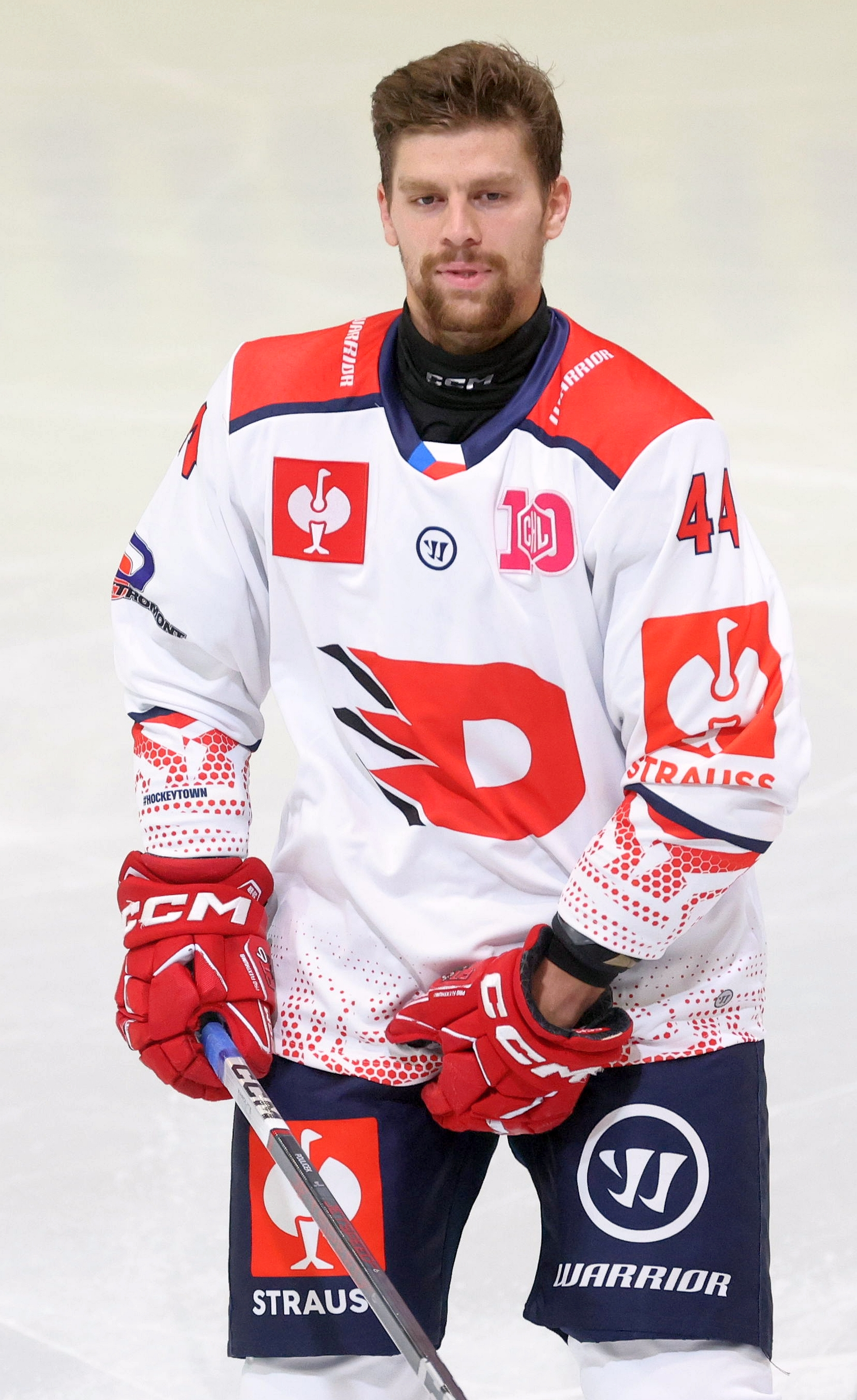
- Patrik Poulíček, 2024
- Born: June 10, 1993 (age 31); Czech Republic
- Height: 6 ft 0 in (183 cm)
- Weight: 181 lb (82 kg; 12 st 13 lb)
- Position: Forward
- Shoots: Left
- Czech Extraliga team: HC Pardubice
- NHL draft: Undrafted
- Playing career: 2013–present

Patrik Poulíček (born June 10, 1993) is a Czech professional ice hockey player. He currently plays with HC Pardubice of the Czech Extraliga.

Poulíček made his Czech Extraliga debut playing with HC Pardubice during the 2013–14 Czech Extraliga season.
