= Yekaterina Nikolayeva =

Russian ice hockey player (born 1995)

- Born: 5 October 1995 (age 31) Saratov, Russia
- Height: 1.65 m (5 ft 5 in)
- Weight: 66 kg (146 lb; 10 st 6 lb)
- Position: Defence
- Shoots: Right
- RWHL team Former teams: HC St. Petersburg; Tornado Moscow Region
- National team: Russia
- Playing career: 2013–present
Medal record
World Championship
Bronze medal – third place	2016 Canada

Yekaterina Gennadiyevna Nikolayeva (Russian: Екатерина Геннадьевна Николаева) (born 5 October 1995) is a Russian ice hockey player for HC St. Petersburg and the Russian national team.

She participated at the 2016 IIHF Women's World Championship.
