= Antonín Růžička =

Czech ice hockey player

- Born: January 29, 1993 (age 32)
- Height: 6 ft 0 in (183 cm)
- Weight: 207 lb (94 kg; 14 st 11 lb)
- Position: Defence
- Shot: Right
- Played for: HC Slavia Praha
- Playing career: 2014–2018

Antonín Růžička (born January 29, 1993) is a Czech former professional ice hockey defenceman.

Růžička played the majority of his career with HC Slavia Praha and played 32 games in the 2014–15 Czech Extraliga season with the team which saw them relegated to the WSM Liga.

Růžička played for Czech Republic national team at junior level and played in the 2011 IIHF World U18 Championships.
