= Yevgenia Dyupina =

Russian ice hockey player (born 1994)

- Born: 30 June 1994 (age 30); Glazov, Russia
- Height: 5 ft 7 in (170 cm)
- Weight: 132 lb (60 kg; 9 st 6 lb)
- Position: Forward
- Shoots: Left
- RWHL team: HC Dinamo Saint Petersburg
- National team: Russia
- Playing career: 2011–present

Yevgenia Andreyevna Dyupina (Russian: Евгения Андреевна Дюпина) (born 30 June 1994) is a Russian ice hockey player for HC Dinamo Saint Petersburg and the Russian national team. She participated at the 2015 IIHF Women's World Championship.
