= Alexander Shin =

Kazakhstani ice hockey player

- Born: November 21, 1985 Ust-Kamenogorsk, Kazakh SSR, Soviet Union
- Height: 6 ft 0 in (183 cm)
- Weight: 154 lb (70 kg; 11 st 0 lb)
- Position: Left wing
- Shot: Left
- VHL team Former teams: Kazzinc-Torpedo; Saryarka Karagandy; Barys Astana
- National team: Kazakhstan
- Playing career: 2004–2024

Alexander Andreyevich Shin (Russian: Александр Андреевич Шин; born November 21, 1985) is a Kazakhstani professional ice hockey player.

== Career statistics ==
=== International ===
Year	Team	Event	Result	GP	G	A	Pts	PIM
2021	Kazakhstan	WC	10th	7	2	1	3	0
Senior totals				7	2	1	3	0
