= Vadim Mitryakov =

Russian ice hockey player

- Born: April 18, 1991 (age 33); Novokuznetsk, Russian SFSR
- Height: 5 ft 8 in (173 cm)
- Weight: 168 lb (76 kg; 12 st 0 lb)
- Position: Forward
- Shoots: Left
- KHL team: Metallurg Novokuznetsk
- NHL draft: Undrafted
- Playing career: 2011–present

Vadim Mitryakov (born April 18, 1991) is a Russian professional ice hockey forward who currently plays for Metallurg Novokuznetsk of the Kontinental Hockey League (KHL).

Mitryakov made his Kontinental Hockey League debut playing with Metallurg Novokuznetsk during the 2010–11 KHL season.
