= Canazei =

Canazei Cianacei (Ladin)
- Comune
- Comune di Canazei
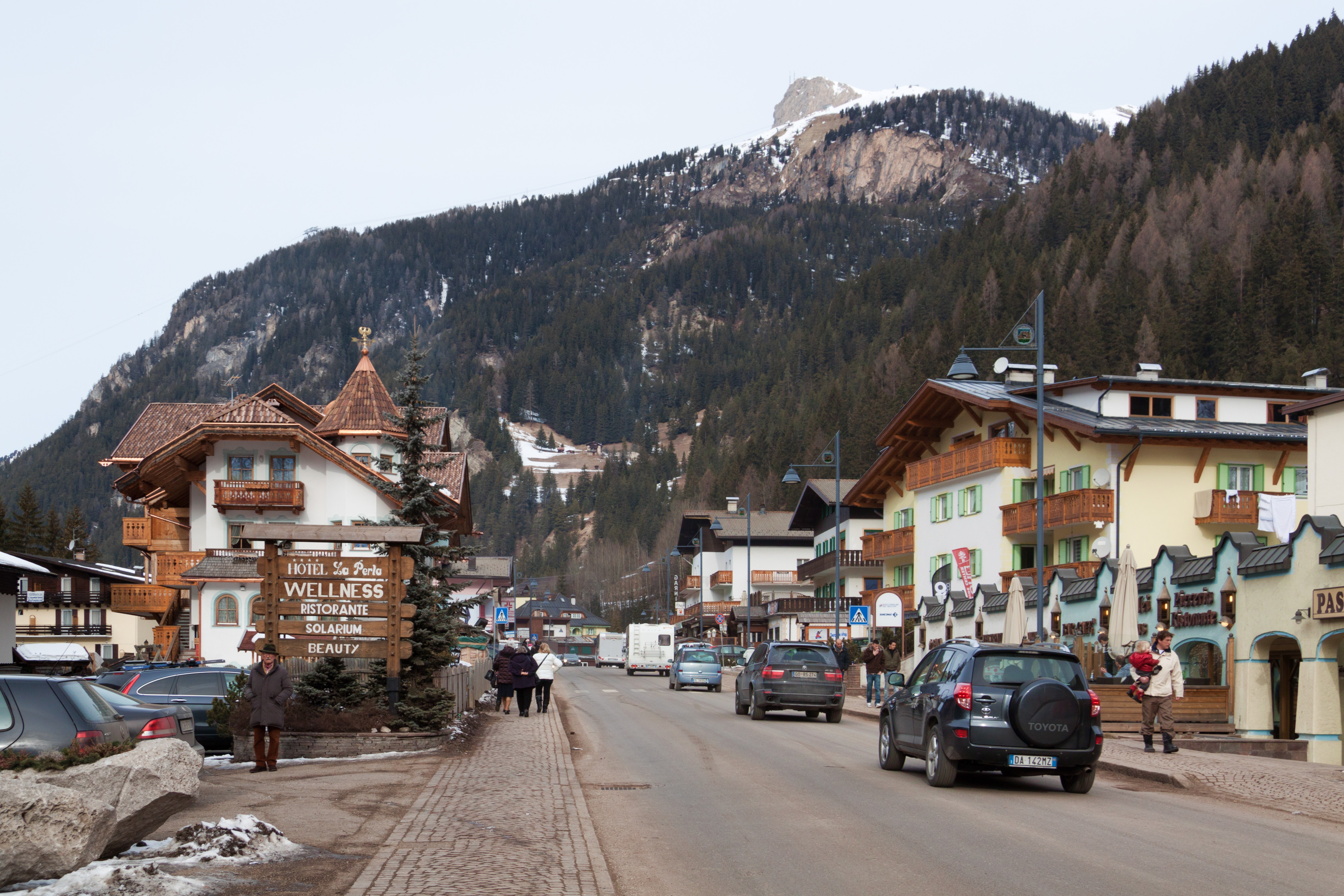
- Canazei center

- Coat of arms

- Location within Italy Location within Trentino-Alto Adige/Südtirol
- Coordinates: 46°28′30″N 11°46′24″E
- Country: Italy
- Region: Trentino-Alto Adige/Südtirol
- Province: Trentino (TN)
- Frazioni: Alba, Gries, Penia and Canazei

Government
  - Mayor: Giovanni Bernard

Area
  - Total: 67.3 km^{2} (26.0 sq mi)
- Elevation: 1,450 m (4,760 ft)

Population (2026)
  - Total: 1,903
  - Density: 28.3/km^{2} (73.2/sq mi)
- Demonym: Fassani
- Time zone: UTC+1 (CET)
  - Summer (DST): UTC+2 (CEST)
- Postal code: 38032
- Dialing code: 0462
- Patron saint: St. Florian
- Website: Official website

Canazei (Italian: [kanatˈtsɛi]; Ladin: Cianacei [tʃanaˈtʃɛi̯] or Cenacei) is a comune (municipality) in Trentino in the northern Italian region of Trentino-Alto Adige/Südtirol, located in the upper part of the Val di Fassa, about 110 kilometres (68 mi) northeast of Trento. Its name derives from the Latin word cannicetus ('cane thicket').

== Demographics ==
In the census of 2001, 1,498 inhabitants out of 1,818 (82.4%) declared Ladin as their native language.

== Main sights ==
- Chiesetta della Madonna della Neve. This church, dedicated to Our Lady of the Snow, is located at Gries, one of the Canazei hamlets, and was built in 1595; it has an onion-domed bell tower, while on the southern facade is an image of S. Christopher, painted in the 18th century.
- Chiesetta di San Floriano, a church in the centre of the village. It was built in 1592.

== Sport ==
Canazei is the base station for excursions and rock climbs to the Sella, Marmolada and Sassolungo Groups.

The comune is represented in ice hockey's Alps Hockey League by HC Fassa Falcons who play at the Stadio del Ghiaccio Gianmario Scola. Canazei co-hosted the 1994 World Ice Hockey Championships with Bolzano and Milan.

Canazei is also a traditional ski resort on the Sellaronda circuit with 42 kilometres (26 mi) of ski slopes.

== Culture ==
Events in the town include:

- Gran Festa da d'Istà ("Great Summer Feast"): on the first Sunday in September, with a traditional folk parade;
- Te Anter i Tobiè: on the second week-end in July.

== Gallery ==
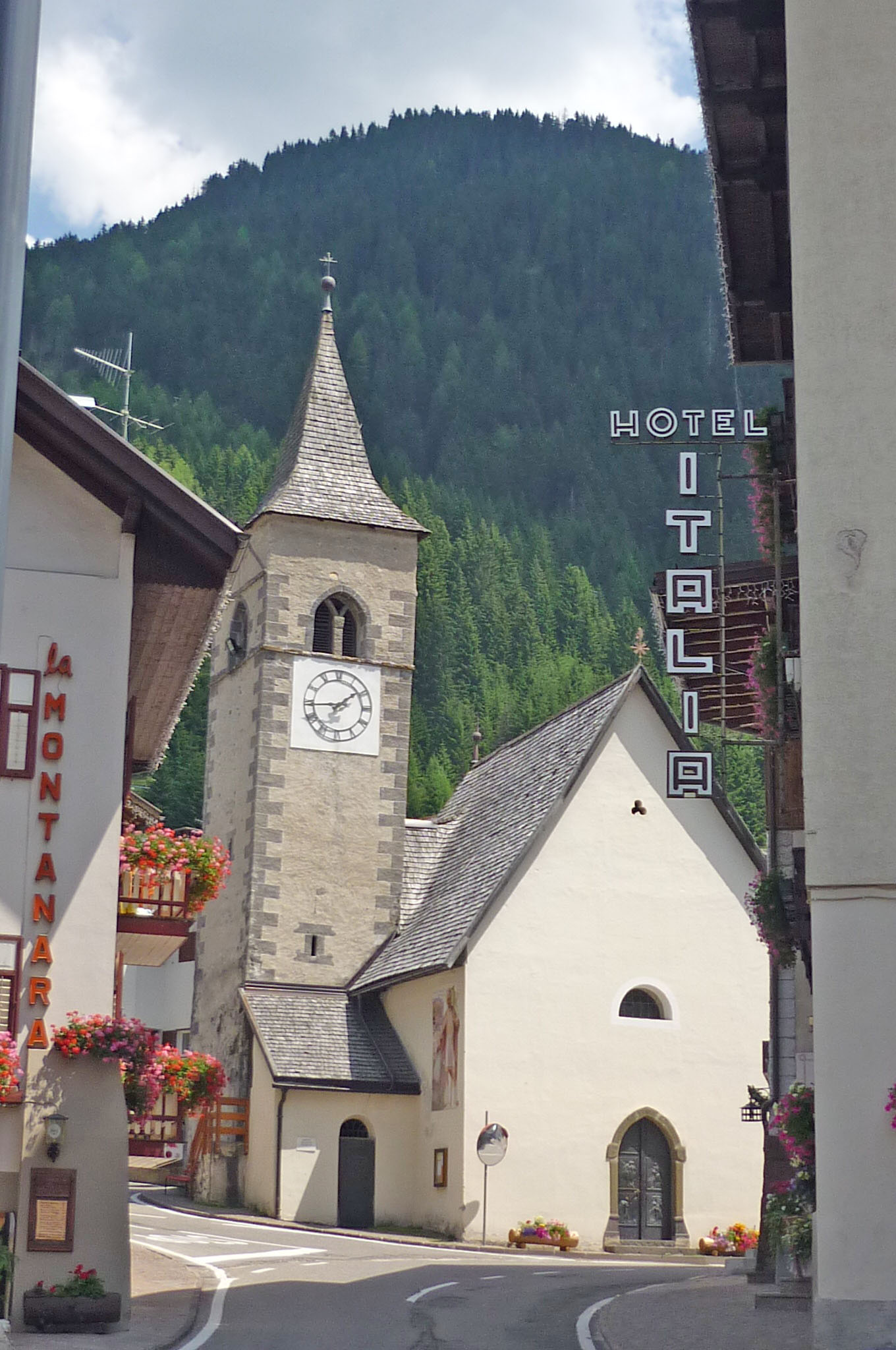
Church of San Floriano Martire

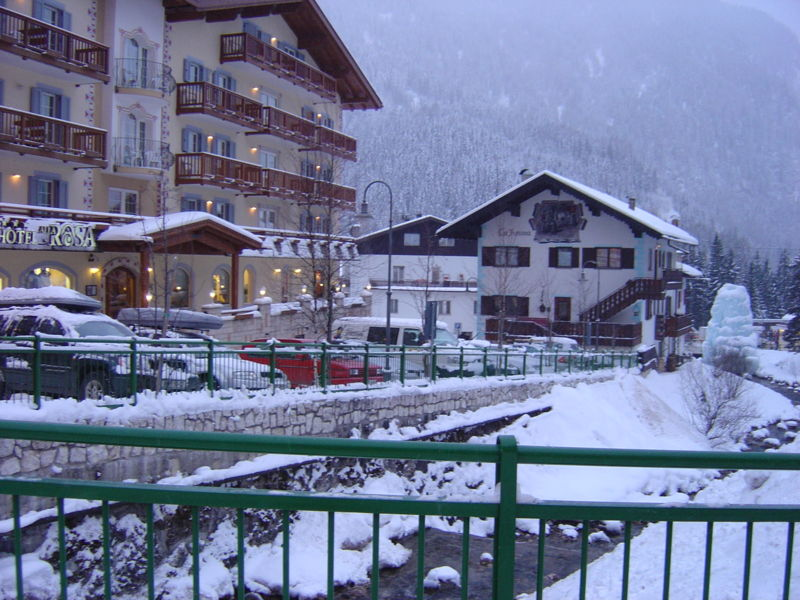
Avisio stream in the town center
