= Tomáš Král =

Czech ice hockey player

- Born: December 29, 1992 (age 33) Plzeň, Czechoslovakia
- Height: 5 ft 11 in (180 cm)
- Weight: 175 lb (79 kg; 12 st 7 lb)
- Position: Goaltender
- Catches: Left
- Chance Liga team Former teams: HC Stadion Litoměřice; Lillehammer IK; HC Sparta Praha; Piráti Chomutov; HC Plzeň
- NHL draft: Undrafted
- Playing career: 2011–present

To be distinguished from cs:Tomáš Král (born 1964) president of the Czech Ice Hockey Union

Tomáš Král (born December 29, 1992) is a Czech professional ice hockey goaltender currently playing for HC Stadion Litoměřice in the Chance Liga.

Král began his career with HC Plzeň's under-18 team in 2007. After two years, he moved to Norway and signed for Lillehammer IK of the GET-ligaen in 2009 and debuted for Lillehammer's senior team during the 2010–11 season.

He then moved to Finland for the following season, with spells at HPK and Oulun Kärpät's junior team. He then spent the next two seasons playing in Finland's second-tier league Mestis and third-tier league Suomi-sarja before returning to the Czech Republic where he played one game for HC Sparta Praha during the 2013–14 season.

He later went on to play in eleven games for Piráti Chomutov and one game for HC Plzeň.
