= Artyom Ignatenko =

Kazakhstani ice hockey player

- Born: 1 March 1990 (age 35); Tselinograd, Kazakh SSR, Soviet Union
- Height: 1.85 m (6 ft 1 in)
- Weight: 87 kg (192 lb; 13 st 10 lb)
- Position: Forward
- Shoots: Left
- KAZ team: Arystan Temirtau
- Playing career: 2007–present

Artyom Ignatenko (born 1 March 1990) is a Kazakhstani professional ice hockey player currently playing for Arystan Temirtau in the Kazakhstan Hockey Championship league.
