= Danil Faizullin =

Russian ice hockey player (born 1993)

- Born: December 3, 1993 (age 32) Kazan, Russia
- Height: 6 ft 1 in (185 cm)
- Weight: 163 lb (74 kg; 11 st 9 lb)
- Position: Forward
- Shoots: Right
- KHL team Former teams: Free agent Ak Bars Kazan; Avangard Omsk; Amur Khabarovsk; Admiral Vladivostok
- Playing career: 2010–present

Danil Faizullin (Russian: Данил Файзуллин; born December 3, 1993) is a Russia professional ice hockey player. He is currently an unrestricted free agent who most recently played with Admiral Vladivostok of the Kontinental Hockey League (KHL).

Faizullin made his Kontinental Hockey League debut playing with Ak Bars Kazan during the 2013–14 season.
