= Enrico Miglioranzi =

Italian ice hockey player

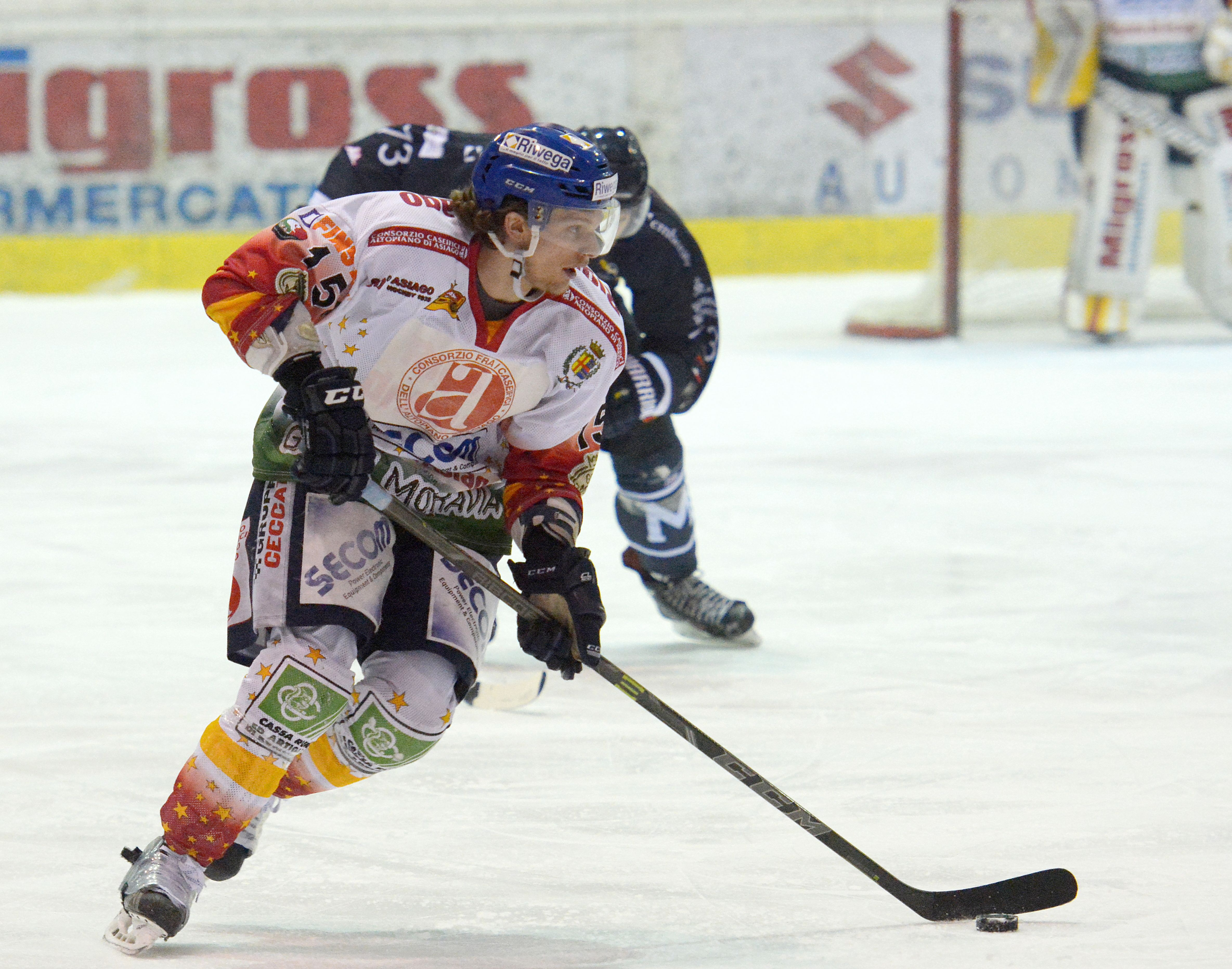
- Enrico Miglioranzi
- Born: October 8, 1991 (age 34) Padua, Italy
- Height: 6 ft 0 in (183 cm)
- Weight: 190 lb (86 kg; 13 st 8 lb)
- Position: Defence
- Shoots: Left
- ICEHL team Former teams: HC Bolzano; Asiago Hockey 1935; Kallinge-Ronneby IF
- National team: Italy
- Playing career: 2007–present

Enrico Miglioranzi (born October 8, 1991) is an Italian ice hockey player for HC Bolzano in the ICE Hockey League (ICEHL) and the Italian national team.

He participated at the 2017 IIHF World Championship.
