= Leonid Metalnikov =

Kazakhstani ice hockey player (born 1990)

- Born: April 24, 1990 (age 35) Ust-Kamenogorsk, Kazakh SSR, Soviet Union
- Height: 6 ft 0 in (183 cm)
- Weight: 187 lb (85 kg; 13 st 5 lb)
- Position: Defenceman
- Shot: Left
- Played for: Barys Nur-Sultan; Admiral Vladivostok
- National team: Kazakhstan
- Playing career: 2009–2025

Leonid Borisovich Metalnikov (Russian: Леонид Борисович Метальников; born April 24, 1990) is a Kazakhstani former professional ice hockey defenceman who played for Barys Astana and Admiral Vladivostok in the Kontinental Hockey League (KHL).

On 20 August 2025, Metalnikov announced his retirement from professional hockey following 16 seasons.
