= Stadio del Ghiaccio Gianmario Scola =

Coordinates: 46°27′43″N 11°47′05″E

- Interactive map of Stadio del Ghiaccio Gianmario Scola
- Location: Canazei, Italy
- Operator: ------------------
- Capacity: 3,500 for Ice hockey

Tenant
- Sportiva Hockey Club Fassa

Stadio del Ghiaccio Gianmario Scola is an indoor sporting arena in Canazei, Italy. The arena can hold up to 3500 spectators and is the home arena of the Sportiva Hockey Club Fassa ice hockey team of the Serie A ice hockey league. The arena also hosted games during the 1994 World Ice Hockey Championships along with the Forum di Assago in Milan and the PalaOnda in Bolzano.

== See also ==
- HC Fassa
