= Yegor Alyoshin =

Russian professional ice hockey Forward

- Born: February 6, 1992 (age 33); Elektrougli, Russia
- Height: 6 ft 0 in (183 cm)
- Weight: 183 lb (83 kg; 13 st 1 lb)
- Position: Forward
- Shoots: Left
- VHL team Former teams: Buran Voronezh; Atlant Moscow Oblast
- Playing career: 2013–present

Yegor Alyoshin (born February 6, 1992) is a Russian professional ice hockey Forward. He is currently playing with Buran Voronezh in the Supreme Hockey League (VHL).

Alyoshin made his Kontinental Hockey League debut playing with Atlant Moscow Oblast during the 2014–15 KHL season.
