= Yury Nazarov =

Russian ice hockey player

- Born: November 13, 1992 (age 32); Novokuznetsk, Russia
- Height: 5 ft 10 in (178 cm)
- Weight: 174 lb (79 kg; 12 st 6 lb)
- Position: Forward
- Shoots: Left
- KHL team Former teams: Amur Khabarovsk; Metallurg Novokuznetsk
- NHL draft: Undrafted
- Playing career: 2010–present

Yury Nazarov (born November 13, 1992) is a Russian professional ice hockey player. He is currently playing with Amur Khabarovsk of the Kontinental Hockey League (KHL).

Nazarov made his Kontinental Hockey League debut playing with Metallurg Novokuznetsk during the 2010–11 KHL season.
