= Alexander Scherbina =

Russian ice hockey player

Alexander Shcherbina
- Born: August 6, 1988 (age 38) St. Petersburg, Russian SFSR
- Height: 5 ft 11 in (180 cm)
- Weight: 194 lb (88 kg; 13 st 12 lb)
- Position: Forward
- Shot: Left
- Played for: SKA Saint Petersburg; HC Vityaz; Neftyanik Almetievsk; Buran Voronezh; HC Sochi; Dynamo St. Petersburg; Sokol Krasnoyarsk; Severstal Cherepovets; Humo Tashkent; Yertis Pavlodar
- Playing career: 2005–2020

Alexander Shcherbina (born August 6, 1988) is a Russian ice hockey coach and former professional ice hockey forward who is currently an assistant coach for Bars Kazan of the Supreme Hockey League (VHL). He previously played for HC Sochi, SKA Saint Petersburg and Vityaz Chekhov in the Kontinental Hockey League (KHL)

On May 6, 2014, Scherbina marked his return to the KHL in signing a one-year contract with expansion club, HC Sochi.

In April 2021, Scherbina announced his retirement as a player.
