= 2016 IIHF Women's World Championship Division II =

International ice hockey competition

Tournament details
- Host countries: Slovenia; Spain; Bulgaria
- Venues: 3 (in 3 host cities)
- Dates: 2–8 April 2016; 29 February – 6 March 2016; 7–10 December 2015
- Teams: 16

The 2016 IIHF Women's World Championship Division II consisted of three international ice hockey tournaments organized by the International Ice Hockey Federation. Division II A, Division II B and Division II B Qualification represent the fourth, fifth and sixth tier of the IIHF Women's World Championship.

== Venues ==
| Division II Group A | Division II Group B | Division II Group B Qualification |
| Bled | Jaca | Sofia |
| Ledena dvorana Bled; Capacity: 5,000 | Pabellón de Hielo; Capacity: 3,579 | Winter Sports Palace; Capacity: 4,600 |

== Division II Group A ==
2016 IIHF Women's World Championship Division II A
Tournament details
- Host country: Slovenia
- City: Bled
- Venue: 1 (in 1 host city)
- Dates: 2–8 April 2016
- Teams: 6

Tournament statistics
- Games played: 15
- Goals scored: 120 (8 per game)
- Attendance: 5,035 (336 per game)
- Scoring leader: (Poland) Karolina Późniewska (14 points)

Official website
- www.iihf.com

The Division II Group A tournament was played in Bled, Slovenia, from 2 to 8 April 2016.

=== Participating teams ===
| Team | Qualification |
|---|---|
| North Korea | Placed 6th in Division I B last year and were relegated. |
| Great Britain | Placed 2nd in Division II A last year. |
| South Korea | Placed 3rd in Division II A last year. |
| Poland | Placed 4th in Division II A last year. |
| Croatia | Placed 5th in Division II A last year. |
| Slovenia | Hosts; placed 1st in Division II B last year and were promoted. |

=== Match officials ===
4 referees and 7 linesmen were selected for the tournament.

Referees

- (United States) Dina Allen
- (Australia) Ainslie Gardner
- (Germany) Tijana Haack
- (Netherlands) Debby Hengst

Linesmen

- (Slovakia) Magdaléna Čerhitová
- (China) Fu Zhennan
- (Sweden) Jessica Lundgren
- (Finland) Linnea Sainio
- (Czech Republic) Gabriela Šťastná
- (Russia) Olga Steinberg
- (Japan) Yuka Tochigi

=== Final standings ===
| Pos | Team | Pld | W | OTW | OTL | L | GF | GA | GD | Pts | Promotion or relegation |
|---|---|---|---|---|---|---|---|---|---|---|---|
| 1 | Poland | 5 | 4 | 0 | 0 | 1 | 37 | 9 | +28 | 12 (Note: Poland 3 Pts, 3–3 GD; South Korea 3 Pts, 2–2 GD; Great Britain 3 Pts, 2–2 GD. After the tie is broken, head-to-head is used and South Korea defeated Great Britain 1–0.) | Promoted to the 2017 Division I B |
| 2 | South Korea | 5 | 4 | 0 | 0 | 1 | 15 | 3 | +12 | 12 | |
| 3 | Great Britain | 5 | 4 | 0 | 0 | 1 | 34 | 3 | +31 | 12 | |
| 4 | North Korea | 5 | 2 | 0 | 0 | 3 | 21 | 23 | −2 | 6 | |
| 5 | Slovenia (H) | 5 | 1 | 0 | 0 | 4 | 9 | 27 | −18 | 3 | |
| 6 | Croatia | 5 | 0 | 0 | 0 | 5 | 4 | 55 | −51 | 0 | Relegated to the 2017 Division II B (Note: Croatia actually did not participate in 2017. Their next World Championship participation was in the 2018 Division II B Qualification.) |

Source: IIHF
Rules for classification: 1) points; 2) head-to-head points; 3) head-to-head goal difference; 4) head-to-head number of goals scored; 5) result against closest best-ranked team outside tied teams; 6) result against second-best ranked team outside tied teams; 7) seeding before tournament.
(H) Host

=== Match results ===
All times are local (Central European Summer Time – UTC+2).

| 2 April 2016; 13:00 | South Korea | 4–1 (1–1, 1–0, 2–0) | North Korea | Ledena dvorana Bled, Bled; Attendance: 200 |

Game reference

Shin So-jung
Goalies
So Jong-sim
Referee:
(Netherlands) Debby Hengst
Linesmen:
(Slovakia) Magdaléna Čerhitová
(Sweden) Jessica Lundgren

| Park C. (Park Y.) (PP) – 12:31 | 1–0 |
| | 1–1 | 17:11 – Han (Jin) |
| Park Y. (Lee K.) – 29:59 | 2–1 |
| Jo (Choi J., Lee K.) (PP) – 56:06 | 3–1 |
| Choi J. (Lee K.) (PP) – 58:26 | 4–1 |

16 min
Penalties
18 min
39
Shots
20

| 2 April 2016; 16:30 | Great Britain | 19–1 (7–1, 4–0, 8–0) | Croatia | Ledena dvorana Bled, Bled; Attendance: 210 |

Game reference

Nicole Jackson
Samantha Bolwell
Goalies
Petra Belobrk
Lana Belić
Referee:
(Germany) Tijana Haack
Linesmen:
(Finland) Linnea Sainio
(Russia) Olga Steinberg

| Herbert (Hill) – 06:03 | 1–0 |
| Newman (Bloom, Allen) – 06:30 | 2–0 |
| Newman (Allen, Bloom) – 09:13 | 3–0 |
| Bloom (Scoon) – 09:37 | 4–0 |
| Henry (Ganney) – 11:11 | 5–0 |
| Allen (Bloom, Scoon) – 12:24 | 6–0 |
| | 6–1 | 13:40 – Smolec (Kadijević) |
| Allen (Hill, Halliwell) – 17:10 | 7–1 |
| Henry (Bloom, Douglas) – 22:47 | 8–1 |
| Farman (SH2) – 30:32 | 9–1 |
| Hutchinson (Ganney, Henry) – 35:19 | 10–1 |
| Allen (Farman) – 37:05 | 11–1 |
| Herbert (Henry, Farman) (PP) – 41:10 | 12–1 |
| Campbell (Adams, Durnell) – 42:30 | 13–1 |
| Ashton (Marsden, Herbert) – 47:51 | 14–1 |
| Henry (Ganney) – 49:59 | 15–1 |
| Herbert (Marsden, Ashton) – 51:40 | 16–1 |
| Allen (Newman, Bloom) – 55:31 | 17–1 |
| Ashton (Herbert, Marsden) – 57:19 | 18–1 |
| Ganney (Lane, Henry) – 59:36 | 19–1 |

10 min
Penalties
10 min
58
Shots
15

| 2 April 2016; 20:00 | Slovenia | 2–9 (0–4, 2–5, 0–0) | Poland | Ledena dvorana Bled, Bled; Attendance: 540 |

Game reference

Ines Confidenti
Pia Dukarič
Goalies
Martyna Sass
Referee:
(Australia) Ainslie Gardner
Linesmen:
(Czech Republic) Gabriela Šťastná
(Japan) Yuka Tochigi

| | 0–1 | 08:32 – Bigos (Wieczorek) (PP) |
| | 0–2 | 12:31 – Chrapek (Czaplik, Późniewska) (PP) |
| | 0–3 | 12:53 – Frąckowiak (Wieczorek) |
| | 0–4 | 17:02 – Wieczorek |
| | 0–5 | 24:51 – Frąckowiak (Wieczorek, Bigos) |
| Kolman (Pren, Duh) – 27:22 | 1–5 |
| | 1–6 | 27:43 – Późniewska (Czaplik, Kosakowska) |
| | 1–7 | 29:08 – Frąckowiak (Wieczorek) |
| | 1–8 | 31:23 – Wieczorek (Bigos) |
| S. Confidenti (Kolman, Pren) (PP) – 33:35 | 2–8 |
| | 2–9 | 35:17 – Tokarska |

10 min
Penalties
8 min
21
Shots
48

| 3 April 2016; 13:00 | Great Britain | 0–1 (0–0, 0–1, 0–0) | South Korea | Ledena dvorana Bled, Bled; Attendance: 245 |

Game reference
| Nicole Jackson | Goalies | Shin So-jung | Referee: (United States) Dina Allen; Linesmen: (China) Fu Zhennan (Czech Republic) Gabriela Šťastná |
| 0–1 / 22:01 – Ko (Han S., Park J.) (PP) | | | Referee: (United States) Dina Allen; Linesmen: (China) Fu Zhennan (Czech Republic) Gabriela Šťastná |
| 18 min | Penalties | 16 min | Referee: (United States) Dina Allen; Linesmen: (China) Fu Zhennan (Czech Republic) Gabriela Šťastná |
| 21 | Shots | 34 | Referee: (United States) Dina Allen; Linesmen: (China) Fu Zhennan (Czech Republic) Gabriela Šťastná |

| 3 April 2016; 16:30 | Croatia | 1–6 (1–1, 0–3, 0–2) | Slovenia | Ledena dvorana Bled, Bled; Attendance: 860 |

Game reference

Petra Belobrk
Goalies
Ines Confidenti
Referee:
(Australia) Ainslie Gardner
Linesmen:
(Sweden) Jessica Lundgren
(Japan) Yuka Tochigi

| Širanović (Gurka, Klanac) – 03:51 | 1–0 |
| | 1–1 | 17:33 – Pren (S. Confidenti, Lepir) |
| | 1–2 | 24:59 – S. Confidenti (Pren (PP) |
| | 1–3 | 33:23 – Pren (S. Confidenti, Lepir) |
| | 1–4 | 36:27 – Dukarič (Duh, Kraner) |
| | 1–5 | 42:39 – Pren (Svetina, Lončar) |
| | 1–6 | 56:28 – Manfreda (Kraner, Kolman) |

6 min
Penalties
6 min
18
Shots
49

| 3 April 2016; 20:00 | North Korea | 4–9 (2–3, 1–2, 1–4) | Poland | Ledena dvorana Bled, Bled; Attendance: 205 |

Game reference

So Jong-sim
Goalies
Martyna Sass
Referee:
(Germany) Tijana Haack
Linesmen:
(Slovakia) Magdaléna Čerhitová
(Russia) Olga Steinberg

| Hwang C.-s. (Jin, Kim Un H.) (PP) – 05:18 | 1–0 |
| | 1–1 | 07:20 – Późniewska (Czaplik) (PP) |
| Choe J. (Kim Un-j.) – 08:28 | 2–1 |
| | 2–2 | 11:27 – Czaplik (Późniewska) (PP) |
| | 2–3 | 16:04 – Późniewska (Czaplik, Czarnecka) (PP) |
| | 2–4 | 25:48 – Czaplik (Późniewska) |
| Kim Un H. (Won, Jin) (PP2) – 28:06 | 3–4 |
| | 3–5 | 35:52 – Późniewska (Kosakowska) |
| | 3–6 | 42:14 – Tomczok (Cygan) |
| | 3–7 | 43:23 – Bigos (Frąckowiak, Późniewska) |
| Won (Ri U.) (SH) – 49:14 | 4–7 |
| | 4–8 | 54:54 – Cygan (Łaskawska) (PP) |
| | 4–9 | 59:20 – Frąckowiak |

22 min
Penalties
14 min
38
Shots
30

| 5 April 2016; 13:00 | North Korea | 8–2 (2–2, 2–0, 4–0) | Croatia | Ledena dvorana Bled, Bled; Attendance: 210 |

Game reference

So Jong-sim
Goalies
Petra Belobrk
Referee:
(United States) Dina Allen
Linesmen:
(Sweden) Jessica Lundgren
(Finland) Linnea Sainio

| | 0–1 | 01:43 – Metelko (Filipec, Lovrenčić) |
| | 0–2 | 02:54 – Smolec |
| Ryo (Jong, Choe J.) – 12:48 | 1–2 |
| Choe U. (Kim Un-j.) – 16:45 | 2–2 |
| Han (Won, Ri U.) – 24:41 | 3–2 |
| Choe J. (Ri U.) – 34:18 | 4–2 |
| Kim H. (SH) – 41:53 | 5–2 |
| Han (Choe J., Jin) – 42:30 | 6–2 |
| Kim K. – 47:19 | 7–2 |
| Choe J. (Ri U., Han) – 50:54 | 8–2 |

6 min
Penalties
4 min
54
Shots
15

| 5 April 2016; 16:30 | South Korea | 1–2 (0–0, 0–0, 1–2) | Poland | Ledena dvorana Bled, Bled; Attendance: 325 |

Game reference

Shin So-jung
Goalies
Martyna Sass
Referee:
(Australia) Ainslie Gardner
Linesmen:
(Slovakia) Magdaléna Čerhitová
(China) Fu Zhennan

| | 0–1 | 44:29 – Frąckowiak (Bigos) |
| | 0–2 | 53:00 – Frąckowiak (Bigos) |
| Park Y. (SH) – 59:28 | 1–2 |

6 min
Penalties
8 min
36
Shots
30

| 5 April 2016; 20:00 | Great Britain | 6–0 (3–0, 2–0, 1–0) | Slovenia | Ledena dvorana Bled, Bled; Attendance: 670 |

Game reference

Nicole Jackson
Goalies
Pia Dukarič
Referee:
(Netherlands) Debby Hengst
Linesmen:
(Czech Republic) Gabriela Šťastná
(Russia) Olga Steinberg

| Ganney (Hill) (SH) – 00:30 | 1–0 |
| Newman (Halliwell, Herbert) (PP) – 17:38 | 2–0 |
| Lane (Henry) – 18:49 | 3–0 |
| Adams (Durnell, Campbell) (PP2) – 33:40 | 4–0 |
| Henry (Ganney, Lane) – 37:39 | 5–0 |
| Ashton (Marsden) – 45:23 | 6–0 |

33 min
Penalties
18 min
51
Shots
26

| 7 April 2016; 13:00 | Poland | 1–2 (1–0, 0–2, 0–0) | Great Britain | Ledena dvorana Bled, Bled; Attendance: 240 |

Game reference

Martyna Sass
Goalies
Nicole Jackson
Referee:
(United States) Dina Allen
Linesmen:
(Slovakia) Magdaléna Čerhitová
(Czech Republic) Gabriela Šťastná

| Frąckowiak (Wieczorek, Bigos) – 01:34 | 1–0 |
| | 1–1 | 29:22 – Newman (Durnell, Allen) |
| | 1–2 | 39:08 – Adams (Marsden, Halliwell) (PP) |

12 min
Penalties
16 min
29
Shots
31

| 7 April 2016; 16:30 | Croatia | 0–6 (0–2, 0–3, 0–1) | South Korea | Ledena dvorana Bled, Bled; Attendance: 200 |

Game reference

Lana Belić
Goalies
Han Do-hee
Referee:
(Netherlands) Debby Hengst
Linesmen:
(Finland) Linnea Sainio
(Japan) Yuka Tochigi

| 0–1 | 06:33 – Park J. (Lee K., Ko) (SH) |
| 0–2 | 14:15 – Choi J. (Jo, Lee K.) (PP) |
| 0–3 | 29:07 – Han S. (Park J.) |
| 0–4 | 29:48 – Park J. (Han S., Ko) |
| 0–5 | 30:00 – Jo (Lee K.) |
| 0–6 | 49:07 – Cho (Han J.) |

14 min
Penalties
12 min
7
Shots
58

| 7 April 2016; 20:00 | Slovenia | 1–8 (0–2, 1–3, 0–3) | North Korea | Ledena dvorana Bled, Bled; Attendance: 430 |

Game reference

Ines Confidenti
Goalies
So Jong-sim
Referee:
(Germany) Tijana Haack
Linesmen:
(China) Fu Zhennan
(Sweden) Jessica Lundgren

| | 0–1 | 04:39 – Ryo (Jong, Kim K.) |
| | 0–2 | 17:40 – Kim H. (Ryo) |
| | 0–3 | 23:22 – Choe J. (Han) |
| Pren (Kolman, S. Confidenti) – 33:08 | 1–3 |
| | 1–4 | 33:16 – Kim H. |
| | 1–5 | 39:29 – Won (Jin, Choe J.) |
| | 1–6 | 51:48 – Ryo (Kim H., Kim K.) (PP2) |
| | 1–7 | 52:32 – Han (Ri U., Choe J.) (PP) |
| | 1–8 | 57:00 – Kim H. (Ryo, Jong) |

16 min
Penalties
2 min
8
Shots
59

| 8 April 2016; 13:00 | Poland | 16–0 (6–0, 6–0, 4–0) | Croatia | Ledena dvorana Bled, Bled; Attendance: 100 |

Game reference

Martyna Sass
Goalies
Lana Belić
Petra Belobrk
Referee:
(Germany) Tijana Haack
Linesmen:
(China) Fu Zhennan
(Russia) Olga Steinberg

| Frąckowiak (Wieczorek) (SH) – 03:00 | 1–0 |
| Późniewska (Kosakowska, Czarnecka) – 05:18 | 2–0 |
| Łaskawska – 07:32 | 3–0 |
| Łaskawska (Gogoc, Cygan) – 15:58 | 4–0 |
| Czaplik (Późniewska) – 16:37 | 5–0 |
| Łaskawska (Gogoc, Cygan) – 18:14 | 6–0 |
| Tomczok (Tokarska) – 23:39 | 7–0 |
| Orawska (Dziwok, Dziedzioch) – 24:47 | 8–0 |
| Łaskawska (Tomczok) – 27:54 | 9–0 |
| Czarnecka (Czaplik, Późniewska) – 29:25 | 10–0 |
| Czarnecka (Późniewska, Czaplik) – 29:54 | 11–0 |
| Późniewska – 33:51 | 12–0 |
| Czarnecka (Czaplik) – 50:54 | 13–0 |
| Bigos (Frąckowiak) – 53:00 | 14–0 |
| Dziwok (PP) – 55:04 | 15–0 |
| Późniewska (Czaplik, Czarnecka) – 55:53 | 16–0 |

6 min
Penalties
14 min
70
Shots
9

| 8 April 2016; 16:30 | North Korea | 0–7 (0–2, 0–2, 0–3) | Great Britain | Ledena dvorana Bled, Bled; Attendance: 150 |

Game reference

So Jong-sim
Ri Pom
Goalies
Nicole Jackson
Referee:
(Australia) Ainslie Gardner
Linesmen:
(Sweden) Jessica Lundgren
(Finland) Linnea Sainio

| 0–1 | 07:36 – Ganney (Henry, Lane) |
| 0–2 | 14:34 – Ganney (Farman) |
| 0–3 | 30:50 – Ganney |
| 0–4 | 39:56 – Allen (Campbell, Newman) |
| 0–5 | 43:05 – Marsden (Ashton, Herbert) |
| 0–6 | 45:58 – Ashton (Marsden) |
| 0–7 | 56:35 – Durnell (Ganney, Henry) |

12 min
Penalties
4 min
27
Shots
28

| 8 April 2016; 20:00 | South Korea | 3–0 (2–0, 1–0, 0–0) | Slovenia | Ledena dvorana Bled, Bled; Attendance: 450 |

Game reference

Shin So-jung
Goalies
Ines Confidenti
Pia Dukarič
Referee:
(United States) Dina Allen
Linesmen:
(Slovakia) Magdaléna Čerhitová
(Japan) Yuka Tochigi

| Han S. (Park J., Park C.) – 04:38 | 1–0 |
| Choi J. (Park J., Park Y.) – 11:50 | 2–0 |
| Park C. (Jung, Han J.) – 25:38 | 3–0 |

4 min
Penalties
8 min
56
Shots
5

=== Awards and statistics ===
==== Awards ====
- Best players selected by the directorate:
  - Best Goalkeeper: (United Kingdom) Nicole Jackson
  - Best Defenseman: (South Korea) Lee Kyou-sun
  - Best Forward: (Poland) Katarzyna Frąckowiak

Source: IIHF.com

==== Scoring leaders ====
List shows the top skaters sorted by points, then goals.

| Player | GP | G | A | Pts | +/− | PIM | POS |
|---|---|---|---|---|---|---|---|
| (Poland) Karolina Późniewska | 5 | 7 | 7 | 14 | +10 | 2 | F |
| (Poland) Magdaleną Czaplik | 5 | 3 | 8 | 11 | +10 | 2 | F |
| (Poland) Katarzyna Frąckowiak | 5 | 8 | 2 | 10 | +9 | 6 | F |
| (United Kingdom) Leanne Ganney | 5 | 5 | 5 | 10 | +11 | 4 | F |
| (United Kingdom) Katie Henry | 5 | 4 | 6 | 10 | +11 | 6 | F |
| (United Kingdom) Saffron Allen | 5 | 5 | 3 | 8 | +8 | 4 | F |
| (North Korea) Choe Jong-hui | 5 | 4 | 4 | 8 | +5 | 6 | F |
| (Poland) Kamila Wieczorek | 5 | 2 | 6 | 8 | +8 | 0 | F |
| (United Kingdom) Sophie Herbert | 5 | 4 | 3 | 7 | +9 | 6 | F |
| (Slovenia) Pia Pren | 5 | 4 | 3 | 7 | –3 | 2 | F |

GP = Games played; G = Goals; A = Assists; Pts = Points; +/− = Plus/minus; PIM = Penalties in minutes; POS = Position
Source: IIHF.com

==== Goaltending leaders ====
Only the top five goaltenders, based on save percentage, who have played at least 40% of their team's minutes, are included in this list.

| Player | TOI | GA | GAA | SA | Sv% | SO |
|---|---|---|---|---|---|---|
| (United Kingdom) Nicole Jackson | 271:02 | 3 | 0.66 | 125 | 97.60 | 2 |
| (South Korea) Shin So-jung | 239:48 | 3 | 0.75 | 76 | 96.05 | 2 |
| (Poland) Martyna Sass | 299:05 | 9 | 1.81 | 135 | 93.33 | 1 |
| (Slovenia) Pia Dukarič | 123:05 | 10 | 4.87 | 101 | 90.10 | 0 |
| (Slovenia) Ines Confidenti | 176:55 | 17 | 5.77 | 131 | 87.02 | 0 |

TOI = Time on Ice (minutes:seconds); SA = Shots against; GA = Goals against; GAA = Goals against average; Sv% = Save percentage; SO = Shutouts
Source: IIHF.com

== Division II Group B ==
2016 IIHF Women's World Championship Division II B
Tournament details
- Host country: Spain
- City: Jaca
- Venue: 1 (in 1 host city)
- Dates: 29 February – 6 March 2016
- Teams: 6

Tournament statistics
- Games played: 15
- Goals scored: 113 (7.53 per game)
- Attendance: 7,633 (509 per game)
- Scoring leader: (Australia) Alivia del Basso (19 points)

Awards
- MVP: (Australia) Alivia del Basso

Official website
- www.iihf.com

The Division II Group B tournament was played in Jaca, Spain, from 29 February to 6 March 2016.

=== Participating teams ===
| Team | Qualification |
|---|---|
| New Zealand | Placed 6th in Division II A and were relegated. |
| Mexico | Placed 2nd in Division II B last year. |
| Spain | Hosts; placed 3rd in Division II B last year. |
| Iceland | Placed 4th in Division II B last year. |
| Australia | Placed 5th in Division II B last year.* |
| Turkey | Placed 1st in Division II B qualification last year and were promoted. |

* Australia announced their intention to withdraw from competition in December, however have changed their plans with the tournament rescheduled for Spain.

=== Match officials ===
4 referees and 7 linesmen were selected for the tournament.

Referees

- (Latvia) Sintija Greiere
- (Netherlands) Natascha Huizeling
- (Slovakia) Zuzana Rimbalová
- (Japan) Etsuko Wada

Linesmen

- (Slovakia) Tatiana Kasášová
- (South Korea) Lee Kyung-sun
- (Norway) Bente Owren
- (Turkey) İlksen Özdemir
- (Czech Republic) Tereza Štreitová
- (Germany) Julia Tschirner
- (Turkey) Sinem Yalçındağ

=== Final standings ===
| Pos | Team | Pld | W | OTW | OTL | L | GF | GA | GD | Pts | Promotion or relegation |
|---|---|---|---|---|---|---|---|---|---|---|---|
| 1 | Australia | 5 | 4 | 0 | 1 | 0 | 32 | 6 | +26 | 13 | Promoted to the 2017 Division II A |
| 2 | Spain (H) | 5 | 4 | 0 | 0 | 1 | 26 | 8 | +18 | 12 | |
| 3 | Iceland | 5 | 3 | 0 | 0 | 2 | 21 | 10 | +11 | 9 | |
| 4 | Mexico | 5 | 2 | 1 | 0 | 2 | 13 | 9 | +4 | 8 | |
| 5 | New Zealand | 5 | 1 | 0 | 0 | 4 | 13 | 40 | −27 | 3 | |
| 6 | Turkey | 5 | 0 | 0 | 0 | 5 | 8 | 40 | −32 | 0 | Relegated to the 2017 Division II B Qualification |

Source: IIHF
Rules for classification: 1) points; 2) head-to-head points; 3) head-to-head goal difference; 4) head-to-head number of goals scored; 5) result against closest best-ranked team outside tied teams; 6) result against second-best ranked team outside tied teams; 7) seeding before tournament.
(H) Host

=== Match results ===
All times are local (Central European Time – UTC+1).

| 29 February 2016; 13:00 | Turkey | 2–7 (0–2, 2–2, 0–3) | Iceland | Pabellon de Hielo, Jaca; Attendance: 120 |

Game reference

Sera Doğramacı
Kübra Dadaşoğlu
Goalies
Guðlaug Þorsteinsdóttir
Referee:
(Slovakia) Zuzana Rimbalová
Linesmen:
(Czech Republic) Tereza Štreitová
(Germany) Julia Tschirner

| | 0–1 | 01:37 – Baldursdóttir (Valdimarsdóttir, Jóhannesdóttir) |
| | 0–2 | 05:16 – Jóhannesdóttir |
| S. Demir (Baktıroğlu) – 21:21 | 1–2 |
| Öztaşdelen (Taygar, Baktıroğlu) – 21:33 | 2–2 |
| | 2–3 | 30:06 – D. Björgvinsdóttir |
| | 2–4 | 39:03 – Jóhannesdóttir (Ágústsdóttir, Shantz-Smiley) (PP) |
| | 2–5 | 47:37 – Jóhannesdóttir (Ágústsdóttir) |
| | 2–6 | 50:32 – Su. Björgvinsdóttir (Ágústsdóttir, Shantz-Smiley) (PP) |
| | 2–7 | 58:04 – Viðarsdóttir (PP) |

12 min
Penalties
14 min
22
Shots
34

| 29 February 2016; 16:30 | Mexico | 2–1 GWS (1–0, 0–1, 0–0) (OT 0–0) (SO: 1–0) | Australia | Pabellon de Hielo, Jaca; Attendance: 200 |

Game reference
| María Meza | Goalies | Michelle Coonan | Referee: (Latvia) Sintija Greiere; Linesmen: (Slovakia) Tatiana Kasášová (Turkey) İlksen Özdemir |
| F. Hernández (Gendron) – 04:03 / 1–0; / 1–1 / 31:08 – Mconie (Powell, Del Basso) (PP) | | | Referee: (Latvia) Sintija Greiere; Linesmen: (Slovakia) Tatiana Kasášová (Turkey) İlksen Özdemir |
| Chávez; Gendron; F. Hernández (miss) | Shootout | (miss) Van der Wolf; Newmark; (miss) Powell | Referee: (Latvia) Sintija Greiere; Linesmen: (Slovakia) Tatiana Kasášová (Turkey) İlksen Özdemir |
| 33 min | Penalties | 10 min | Referee: (Latvia) Sintija Greiere; Linesmen: (Slovakia) Tatiana Kasášová (Turkey) İlksen Özdemir |
| 13 | Shots | 46 | Referee: (Latvia) Sintija Greiere; Linesmen: (Slovakia) Tatiana Kasášová (Turkey) İlksen Özdemir |

| 29 February 2016; 20:00 | Spain | 11–1 (6–0, 4–0, 1–1) | New Zealand | Pabellon de Hielo, Jaca; Attendance: 850 |

Game reference

Alba Gonzalo
Esther García
Goalies
Shelby Wood
Referee:
(Netherlands) Natascha Huizeling
Linesmen:
(South Korea) Lee Kyung-sun
(Norway) Bente Owren

| Sierra (Hernández) – 02:51 | 1–0 |
| Muñoz (L. Danielsson Borrasca, Ortiz) – 08:01 | 2–0 |
| Merino (L. Abrisqueta) – 09:56 | 3–0 |
| Muñoz (L. Danielsson Borrasca, Ortiz) – 10:36 | 4–0 |
| Muñoz (L. Danielsson Borrasca) – 14:52 | 5–0 |
| Senac Gómez (Merino) – 16:44 | 6–0 |
| Senac Gómez (Villar, L. Abrisqueta) – 20:18 | 7–0 |
| L. Danielsson Borrasca (Muñoz) (PP) – 21:41 | 8–0 |
| Muñoz (L. Danielsson Borrasca, S. Danielsson Borrasca) (PP) – 35:39 | 9–0 |
| Rivera Gil (PP) – 39:37 | 10–0 |
| | 10–1 | 44:22 – Thakker (Lilly, Jensen) (PP) |
| Rivera Gil (Marques) (PP) – 57:04 | 11–1 |

6 min
Penalties
14 min
57
Shots
12

| 1 March 2016; 13:00 | Australia | 12–0 (4–0, 6–0, 2–0) | Turkey | Pabellon de Hielo, Jaca; Attendance: 120 |

Game reference

Claudia Tom
Goalies
Sera Doğramacı
Kübra Dadaşoğlu
Referee:
(Japan) Etsuko Wada
Linesmen:
(South Korea) Lee Kyung-sun
(Norway) Bente Owren

| Tihema (Padjen, Del Basso) – 03:10 | 1–0 |
| Newmark (Del Basso) (PP) – 17:16 | 2–0 |
| M. Poole (Del Basso) – 17:27 | 3–0 |
| (Del Basso) (Padjen) (PP) – 18:52 | 4–0 |
| Del Basso (Tihema) – 20:35 | 5–0 |
| Parrington (PS) – 21:55 | 6–0 |
| Del Basso (Newmark) (PP) – 27:15 | 7–0 |
| Newmark (Cockerell, Del Basso) – 32:56 | 8–0 |
| Padjen (Del Basso, Newmark) (PP) – 35:59 | 9–0 |
| Powell (Parrington, Padjen) – 39:04 | 10–0 |
| Powell (Lehmann, Parrington) – 43:27 | 11–0 |
| Del Basso (Harvey) – 44:00 | 12–0 |

16 min
Penalties
12 min
73
Shots
12

| 1 March 2016; 16:30 | New Zealand | 2–8 (1–5, 1–2, 0–1) | Iceland | Pabellon de Hielo, Jaca; Attendance: 135 |

Game reference

Shelby Wood
Goalies
Elise Väljaots
Referee:
(Netherlands) Natascha Huizeling
Linesmen:
(Slovakia) Tatiana Kasášová
(Turkey) Sinem Yalçındağ

| | 0–1 | 04:19 – Si. Björgvinsdóttir (Baldursdóttir) (PP) |
| | 0–2 | 05:24 – Su. Björgvinsdóttir (Shantz-Smiley) |
| | 0–3 | 06:47 – Viðarsdóttir (Gudbjartsdóttir) |
| | 0–4 | 11:45 – Si. Björgvinsdóttir (Jóhannesdóttir) |
| | 0–5 | 15:05 – Su. Björgvinsdóttir (Viðarsdóttir, Shantz-Smiley) (PP) |
| Thakker (Davis) (PP) – 15:33 | 1–5 |
| | 1–6 | 22:23 – Si. Björgvinsdóttir (Jóhannesdóttir) |
| Gerken (Thakker, Davis) – 24:24 | 2–6 |
| | 2–7 | 29:00 – Su. Björgvinsdóttir (Ingadóttir, Viðarsdóttir) (PP) |
| | 2–8 | 40:14 – Si. Björgvinsdóttir (Ingadóttir, Su. Björgvinsdóttir) |

10 min
Penalties
10 min
26
Shots
46

| 1 March 2016; 20:00 | Mexico | 0–3 (0–1, 0–2, 0–0) | Spain | Pabellon de Hielo, Jaca; Attendance: 650 |

Game reference

Mónica Rentería
María Meza
Goalies
Alba Gonzalo
Referee:
(Slovakia) Zuzana Rimbalová
Linesmen:
(Czech Republic) Tereza Štreitová
(Germany) Julia Tschirner

| 0–1 | 18:09 – Sierra (Hernández) |
| 0–2 | 20:47 – L. Danielsson Borrasca (Ortiz) (PP) |
| 0–3 | 30:26 – V. Abrisqueta (Gómez) (PP) |

14 min
Penalties
12 min
29
Shots
31

| 3 March 2016; 13:00 | New Zealand | 1–12 (0–2, 1–5, 0–5) | Australia | Pabellon de Hielo, Jaca; Attendance: 132 |

Game reference

Daisy Hopkins
Shelby Hopkins
Goalies
Claudia Tom
Referee:
(Latvia) Sintija Greiere
Linesmen:
(Turkey) İlksen Özdemir
(Germany) Julia Tschirner

| | 0–1 | 17:13 – Powell (Del Basso) (PP) |
| | 0–2 | 17:49 – Godfrey |
| Thakker (Lilly) (PP2) – 20:31 | 1–2 |
| | 1–3 | 22:40 – Powell (Del Basso) (PP) |
| | 1–4 | 25:07 – M. Poole (Costa, McOnie) |
| | 1–5 | 25:42 – Costa (Godfrey, Del Basso) |
| | 1–6 | 26:42 – Parrington |
| | 1–7 | 31:43 – Del Basso |
| | 1–8 | 42:59 – Del Basso (Powell, Newmark) |
| | 1–9 | 43:07 – Tihema (Parrington) |
| | 1–10 | 50:25 – Reynolds (McOnie) |
| | 1–11 | 53:25 – Godfrey (Del Basso, Powell) (PP) |
| | 1–12 | 54:51 – Reynolds (Cockerell) |

14 min
Penalties
14 min
10
Shots
60

| 3 March 2016; 16:30 | Mexico | 6–1 (1–0, 3–0, 2–1) | Turkey | Pabellon de Hielo, Jaca; Attendance: 550 |

Game reference

María Meza
Goalies
Kübra Dadaşoğlu
Sera Doğramacı
Referee:
(Netherlands) Natascha Huizeling
Linesmen:
(Slovakia) Tatiana Kasášová
(Norway) Bente Owren

| Téllez (Chávez, Gendron) (PP) – 11:10 | 1–0 |
| González (J. Rojas, G. Rojas) – 22:18 | 2–0 |
| Larios (F. Hernández, Hurtado) – 27:17 | 3–0 |
| Larios (Cruz, Meza) (PP) – 30:27 | 4–0 |
| Hurtado (F. Hernández) – 42:16 | 5–0 |
| F. Hernández (J. Rojas) – 45:49 | 6–0 |
| | 6–1 | 54:04 – Baktıroğlu (Demirkol, S. Demir) (PP) |

8 min
Penalties
16 min
39
Shots
14

| 3 March 2016; 20:00 | Spain | 3–2 (1–0, 1–1, 1–1) | Iceland | Pabellon de Hielo, Jaca; Attendance: 1,050 |

Game reference

Alba Gonzalo
Goalies
Guðlaug Þorsteinsdóttir
Referee:
(Japan) Etsuko Wada
Linesmen:
(Czech Republic) Tereza Štreitová
(Turkey) Sinem Yalçındağ

| S. Danielsson Borrasca (Ayala) – 14:17 | 1–0 |
| | 1–1 | 26:56 – Si. Björgvinsdóttir (Baldursdóttir, Ágústsdóttir) |
| L. Abrisqueta (Gómez, V. Abrisqueta) (PP) – 37:27 | 2–1 |
| | 2–2 | 47:36 – Su. Björgvinsdóttir |
| Merino (V. Abrisqueta, Gómez) (PP) – 54:27 | 3–2 |

4 min
Penalties
6 min
26
Shots
26

| 5 March 2016; 13:00 | Iceland | 2–0 (1–0, 0–0, 1–0) | Mexico | Pabellon de Hielo, Jaca; Attendance: 152 |

Game reference
| Elise Väljaots | Goalies | María Meza | Referee: (Japan) Etsuko Wada; Linesmen: (Turkey) İlksen Özdemir (Turkey) Sinem Yalçındağ |
| Jóhannesdóttir – 06:00 / 1–0; Su. Björgvinsdóttir (Viðarsdóttir) – 55:42 / 2–0 | | | Referee: (Japan) Etsuko Wada; Linesmen: (Turkey) İlksen Özdemir (Turkey) Sinem Yalçındağ |
| 2 min | Penalties | 6 min | Referee: (Japan) Etsuko Wada; Linesmen: (Turkey) İlksen Özdemir (Turkey) Sinem Yalçındağ |
| 26 | Shots | 26 | Referee: (Japan) Etsuko Wada; Linesmen: (Turkey) İlksen Özdemir (Turkey) Sinem Yalçındağ |

| 5 March 2016; 16:30 | Turkey | 4–7 (0–1, 1–1, 3–5) | New Zealand | Pabellon de Hielo, Jaca; Attendance: 354 |

Game reference

Kübra Dadaşoğlu
Sera Doğramacı
Goalies
Shelby Wood
Referee:
(Latvia) Sintija Greiere
Linesmen:
(South Korea) Lee Kyung-sun
(Czech Republic) Tereza Štreitová

| | 0–1 | 19:11 – Murray (Thakker) (PP) |
| | 0–2 | 23:13 – Neville-Lamb (SH) |
| S. Yılmaz (Taygar, Yurt) – 26:31 | 1–2 |
| | 1–3 | 40:48 – Murray (Shields) (SH) |
| | 1–4 | 42:43 – Leon de la Barra (Jensen) |
| | 1–5 | 45:18 – Thakker (Shields) (PP) |
| S. Demir (Uygun) – 45:35 | 2–5 |
| | 2–6 | 49:24 – Thakker (Davis, Gregory) (PP) |
| S. Demir (Yurt) – 49:37 | 3–6 |
| S. Demir – 56:13 | 4–6 |
| | 4–7 | 58:15 – Thakker (Davis, E. Thompson) |

12 min
Penalties
6 min
34
Shots
30

| 5 March 2016; 20:00 | Australia | 4–1 (2–1, 0–0, 2–0) | Spain | Pabellon de Hielo, Jaca; Attendance: 1,600 |

Game reference

Michelle Coonan
Goalies
Alba Gonzalo
Referee:
(Slovakia) Zuzana Rimbalová
Linesmen:
(Norway) Bente Owren
(Germany) Julia Tschirner

| | 0–1 | 05:59 – Merino |
| Tihema (Van der Wolf) – 15:08 | 1–1 |
| Powell (Godfrey) – 19:18 | 2–1 |
| Del Basso – 42:41 | 3–1 |
| Tihema (Parrington) (ENG) – 58:14 | 4–1 |

14 min
Penalties
12 min
38
Shots
16

| 6 March 2016; 13:00 | New Zealand | 2–5 (1–2, 1–2, 0–1) | Mexico | Pabellon de Hielo, Jaca; Attendance: 120 |

Game reference

María Meza
Mónica Rentería
Goalies
Daisy Hopkins
Referee:
(Japan) Etsuko Wada
Linesmen:
(Turkey) İlksen Özdemir
(Turkey) Sinem Yalçındağ

| | 0–1 | 11:47 – Téllez (F. Hernández, Gendron) |
| Neville-Lamb (Thakker) (PP) – 14:33 | 1–1 |
| | 1–2 | 16:25 – Gendron (Cruz) (PP) |
| | 1–3 | 30:18 – Chávez (Téllez) |
| Thakker (Leon de la Barra) (PP) – 35:55 | 2–3 |
| | 2–4 | 37:45 – F. Hernández (Gendron) (PP) |
| | 2–5 | 46:13 – Téllez (Cárdenas) |

10 min
Penalties
14 min
23
Shots
49

| 6 March 2016; 16:30 | Iceland | 2–3 (0–1, 1–1, 1–1) | Australia | Pabellon de Hielo, Jaca; Attendance: 700 |

Game reference

Elise Väljaots
Goalies
Michelle Coonan
Referee:
(Slovakia) Zuzana Rimbalová
Linesmen:
(Czech Republic) Tereza Štreitová
(Germany) Julia Tschirner

| | 0–1 | 06:19 – Del Basso (Parrington, Harvey) |
| | 0–2 | 24:38 – Lehmann (Powell, Godfrey) (PP) |
| Jóhannesdóttir (Si. Björgvinsdóttir) – 25:36 | 1–2 |
| | 1–3 | 55:11 – Godfrey |
| Jóhannesdóttir (Shantz-Smiley) – 58:10 | 2–3 |

4 min
Penalties
4 min
15
Shots
35

| 6 March 2016; 20:00 | Spain | 8–1 (2–0, 4–0, 2–1) | Turkey | Pabellon de Hielo, Jaca; Attendance: 900 |

Game reference

Esther García
Alba Gonzalo
Goalies
Kübra Dadaşoğlu
Sera Doğramacı
Referee:
(Latvia) Sintija Greiere
Linesmen:
(Slovakia) Tatiana Kasášová
(South Korea) Lee Kyung-sun

| Sans (Rivera Gil) (PP) – 08:26 | 1–0 |
| Rivera Gil (L. Abrisqueta) – 17:54 | 2–0 |
| V. Abrisqueta – 25:49 | 3–0 |
| Sierra (Hernández, Reventós) – 28:37 | 4–0 |
| Sans (Rivera Gil, Marqués) – 29:20 | 5–0 |
| Marqués (Grande) – 39:02 | 6–0 |
| Ayala (Hernández) (SH) – 43:48 | 7–0 |
| | 7–1 | 47:19 – Baktıroğlu (PP) |
| Marqués (Hernández) (PP) – 49:14 | 8–1 |

8 min
Penalties
12 min
46
Shots
11

=== Awards and statistics ===
==== Awards ====
- Best players selected by the directorate:
  - Best Goalkeeper: (Spain) Alba Gonzalo
  - Best Defenseman: (Spain) Vanesa Abrisqueta
  - Best Forward: (Australia) Alivia del Basso

Source: IIHF.com

==== Scoring leaders ====
List shows the top skaters sorted by points, then goals.

| Player | GP | G | A | Pts | +/− | PIM | POS |
|---|---|---|---|---|---|---|---|
| (Australia) Alivia del Basso | 5 | 8 | 11 | 19 | +13 | 8 | F |
| (New Zealand) Anjali Thakker | 5 | 7 | 3 | 10 | –4 | 2 | F |
| (Iceland) Flosrún Jóhannesdóttir | 5 | 6 | 3 | 9 | +7 | 4 | F |
| (Australia) Shona Powell | 5 | 5 | 4 | 9 | +7 | 10 | F |
| (Iceland) Sunna Björgvinsdóttir | 5 | 6 | 1 | 7 | 0 | 2 | F |
| (Australia) Sharna Godfrey | 5 | 3 | 4 | 7 | +8 | 12 | F |
| (Australia) Lucy Parrington | 5 | 2 | 5 | 7 | +10 | 4 | F |
| (Iceland) Silvia Björgvinsdóttir | 5 | 5 | 1 | 6 | +5 | 0 | F |
| (Mexico) Francia Hernández | 5 | 3 | 3 | 6 | +4 | 6 | F |
| (Spain) Laura Danielsson Borrasca | 5 | 2 | 4 | 6 | 0 | 2 | F |
| (Mexico) Daniela Gendron | 5 | 2 | 4 | 6 | +1 | 6 | D |

GP = Games played; G = Goals; A = Assists; Pts = Points; +/− = Plus/minus; PIM = Penalties in minutes; POS = Position
Source: IIHF.com

==== Goaltending leaders ====
Only the top five goaltenders, based on save percentage, who have played at least 40% of their team's minutes, are included in this list.

| Player | TOI | GA | GAA | SA | Sv% | SO |
|---|---|---|---|---|---|---|
| (Spain) Alba Gonzalo | 259:41 | 5 | 1.16 | 106 | 95.28 | 1 |
| (Mexico) María Meza | 251:24 | 6 | 1.43 | 109 | 94.78 | 0 |
| (Iceland) Elise Väljaots | 178:59 | 5 | 1.68 | 82 | 94.25 | 1 |
| (Australia) Michelle Coonan | 185:00 | 5 | 1.62 | 39 | 88.64 | 0 |
| (New Zealand) Shelby Wood | 196:53 | 26 | 7.92 | 127 | 83.01 | 0 |

TOI = Time on Ice (minutes:seconds); SA = Shots against; GA = Goals against; GAA = Goals against average; Sv% = Save percentage; SO = Shutouts
Source: IIHF.com

== Division II Group B Qualification ==
2016 IIHF Women's World Championship Division II B Qualification
Tournament details
- Host country: Bulgaria
- City: Sofia
- Venue: 1 (in 1 host city)
- Dates: 7–10 December 2015
- Teams: 4

Tournament statistics
- Games played: 6
- Goals scored: 50 (8.33 per game)
- Attendance: 1,451 (242 per game)
- Scoring leader: (Hong Kong) Ip Estelle Claudia (11 points)

Official website
- www.iihf.com

The Division II Group B Qualification tournament was played in Sofia, Bulgaria, from 7 to 10 December 2015.

=== Participating teams ===
| Team | Qualification |
|---|---|
| Hong Kong | Placed 2nd in the Division II B Qualification last year. |
| South Africa | Placed 3rd in the Division II B Qualification last year. |
| Bulgaria | Hosts; placed 4th in Division II B Qualification last year. |
| Romania | First participation since 2011. |

=== Match officials ===
3 referees and 5 linesmen were selected for the tournament.

Referees

- (Norway) Elise Rasmussen
- (Lithuania) Ramune Maleckienė
- (Poland) Katarzyna Zygmunt

Linesmen

- (Latvia) Jana Gerkena
- (Iceland) Ingibjörg Hjartardóttir
- (Russia) Elizaveta Kolchina
- (Kazakhstan) Oksana Shestakova
- (Czech Republic) Zuzana Svobodová

=== Final standings ===
| Pos | Team | Pld | W | OTW | OTL | L | GF | GA | GD | Pts | Promotion |
|---|---|---|---|---|---|---|---|---|---|---|---|
| 1 | Romania | 3 | 2 | 0 | 1 | 0 | 15 | 9 | +6 | 7 | Promoted to the 2017 Division II B |
| 2 | Hong Kong | 3 | 2 | 0 | 0 | 1 | 15 | 9 | +6 | 6 | |
| 3 | South Africa | 3 | 1 | 1 | 0 | 1 | 12 | 8 | +4 | 5 | |
| 4 | Bulgaria (H) | 3 | 0 | 0 | 0 | 3 | 8 | 24 | −16 | 0 | |

Source: IIHF
Rules for classification: 1) points; 2) head-to-head points; 3) head-to-head goal difference; 4) head-to-head number of goals scored; 5) result against closest best-ranked team outside tied teams; 6) result against second-best ranked team outside tied teams; 7) seeding before tournament.
(H) Host

=== Match results ===
All times are local (Eastern European Time – UTC+2).

| 7 December 2015; 16:00 | South Africa | 3–2 (0–1, 2–1, 0–0); OT (1–0) | Romania | Winter Sports Palace, Sofia; Attendance: 100 |

Game reference

Shaylene Swanepoel
Goalies
Beáta Antal
Referee:
(Lithuania) Ramune Maleckienė
Linesmen:
(Latvia) Jana Gerkena
(Kazakhstan) Oksana Shestakova

| | 0–1 | 08:24 – Voicu |
| Oxenham (C. Schuurman (PP) – 25:40 | 1–1 |
| | 1–2 | 37:32 – Bálint |
| C. Shuurman (Kotze) – 39:22 | 2–2 |
| Rhode (C. Schuurman) – 62:52 | 3–2 |

8 min
Penalties
8 min
15
Shots
32

| 7 December 2015; 19:30 | Bulgaria | 2–9 (1–2, 1–3, 0–4) | Hong Kong | Winter Sports Palace, Sofia; Attendance: 350 |

Game reference

Vesela Krasteva
Paulina Georgieva
Goalies
Wong Ying Chi Virginia
Referee:
(Norway) Elise Rasmussen
Linesmen:
(Iceland) Ingibjörg Hjartardóttir
(Czech Republic) Zuzana Svobodová

| | 0–1 | 06:08 – Ip (Li, Wong T.) (PP) |
| | 0–2 | 08:26 – Wong T. |
| Zareva (Stoyanova) – 13:50 | 1–2 |
| | 1–3 | 21:56 – Ip (Wong T., Kong C.) |
| | 1–4 | 22:53 – Ip (Wong T.) |
| | 1–5 | 30:06 – Ip (Wong T., Kong C.) (PP) |
| Iliycheva (Zareva) (PP) – 33:15 | 2–5 |
| | 2–6 | 40:24 – Ip (SH) |
| | 2–7 | 44:01 – Wong T. |
| | 2–8 | 45:26 – Low (Leung) |
| | 2–9 | 54:20 – Ip (Wong T.) (PP) |

14 min
Penalties
14 min
22
Shots
25

| 8 December 2015; 16:00 | Hong Kong | 3–5 (2–1, 1–2, 0–2) | Romania | Winter Sports Palace, Sofia; Attendance: 100 |

Game reference

Lee Jenny Kai-Chin
Goalies
Beáta Antal
Referee:
(Norway) Elise Rasmussen
Linesmen:
(Latvia) Jana Gerkena
(Czech Republic) Zuzana Svobodová

| Wong T. (Ip) – 06:35 | 1–0 |
| Ip (PP) – 12:39 | 2–0 |
| | 2–1 | 14:56 – N. Balló (Voicu) |
| | 2–2 | 20:08 – Voicu (N. Balló) |
| | 2–3 | 22:47 – Balló (Bárta, Voicu) |
| Wong T. – 33:43 | 3–3 |
| | 3–4 | 49:29 – Popescu |
| | 3–5 | 56:38 – Biro (Oprea) |

18 min
Penalties
18 min
19
Shots
37

| 8 December 2015; 19:30 | South Africa | 7–3 (2–1, 3–2, 2–0) | Bulgaria | Winter Sports Palace, Sofia; Attendance: 250 |

Game reference

Danielle Kotze
Goalies
Vesela Krasteva
Referee:
(Poland) Katarzyna Zygmunt
Linesmen:
(Russia) Elizaveta Kolchina
(Kazakhstan) Oksana Shestakova

| Rhode (Jamieson) – 06:26 | 1–0 |
| | 1–1 | 14:07 – Koleva (Lisichkova, Stoyanova) (PP) |
| C. Schuurman (PP) – 15:02 | 2–1 |
| | 2–2 | 24:29 – Lisichkova |
| Keuler (Rhode) (SH) – 25:45 | 3–2 |
| | 3–3 | 26:26 – Koleva (Monova, Zareva) |
| Rhode – 31:26 | 4–3 |
| Skinner (PP) – 33:09 | 5–3 |
| Cronje (PP) – 51:44 | 6–3 |
| Oxenham – 55:20 | 7–3 |

16 min
Penalties
30 min
44
Shots
17

| 10 December 2015; 16:00 | Hong Kong | 3–2 (0–1, 1–0, 2–1) | South Africa | Winter Sports Palace, Sofia; Attendance: 111 |

Game reference

Wong Ying Chi Virginia
Lee Jenny Kai-Chin
Goalies
Shaylene Swanepoel
Referee:
(Lithuania) Ramune Maleckienė
Linesmen:
(Iceland) Ingibjörg Hjartardóttir
(Kazakhstan) Oksana Shestakova

| | 0–1 | 19:42 – Rhode |
| Wong T. (Ip, Low) – 25:35 | 1–1 |
| Kong C.. (Ip, Leung) (PP2) – 46:27 | 2–1 |
| | 2–2 | 49:55 – Oxenham |
| Ip (Kong P.) – 50:36 | 3–2 |

6 min
Penalties
10 min
15
Shots
26

| 10 December 2015; 19:30 | Romania | 8–3 (3–1, 2–1, 3–1) | Bulgaria | Winter Sports Palace, Sofia; Attendance: 540 |

Game reference

Beáta Antal
Goalies
Vesela Krasteva
Referee:
(Poland) Katarzyna Zygmunt
Linesmen:
(Russia) Elizaveta Kolchina
(Czech Republic) Zuzana Svobodová

| N. Balló (Bárta) – 00:43 | 1–0 |
| Voicu (N. Balló) (SH) – 03:04 | 2–0 |
| Voicu – 05:57 | 3–0 |
| | 3–1 | 10:27 – Koleva (PP) |
| Popescu – 21:42 | 4–1 |
| | 4–2 | 24:58 – Zareva (Stoyanova) |
| Voicu (N. Balló) (PP2) – 26:39 | 5–2 |
| | 5–3 | 41:49 – Lisichkova (Petkova) |
| Voicu (Balló) – 57:35 | 6–3 |
| Voicu (Bárta) – 58:12 | 7–3 |
| N. Balló – 58:22 | 8–3 |

14 min
Penalties
16 min
69
Shots
16

=== Statistics ===
==== Scoring leaders ====
List shows the top skaters sorted by points, then goals.

| Player | GP | G | A | Pts | +/− | PIM | POS |
|---|---|---|---|---|---|---|---|
| (Hong Kong) Ip Estelle Claudia | 3 | 8 | 3 | 11 | +2 | 4 | F |
| (Hong Kong) Wong Tsui Yi | 3 | 5 | 5 | 10 | +1 | 2 | F |
| (Romania) Ana Voicu | 3 | 7 | 2 | 9 | +9 | 2 | F |
| (Romania) Noémi Balló | 3 | 4 | 4 | 8 | +10 | 0 | F |
| (South Africa) Dalene Rhode | 3 | 4 | 1 | 5 | +2 | 2 | F |
| (South Africa) Chloe Schuurman | 3 | 2 | 2 | 4 | +4 | 2 | F |
| (Bulgaria) Mirela Zareva | 3 | 2 | 2 | 4 | –3 | 12 | F |
| (Hong Kong) Kong Cheryl Lauren | 3 | 1 | 3 | 4 | +1 | 6 | F |
| (Bulgaria) Amalia Koleva | 3 | 3 | 0 | 3 | –7 | 8 | F |
| (South Africa) Donne Oxenham | 3 | 3 | 0 | 3 | +1 | 2 | D |

GP = Games played; G = Goals; A = Assists; Pts = Points; +/− = Plus/minus; PIM = Penalties in minutes; POS = Position
Source: IIHF.com

==== Leading goaltenders ====
Only the top five goaltenders, based on save percentage, who have played at least 40% of their team's minutes, are included in this list.

| Player | TOI | GA | GAA | SA | Sv% | SO |
|---|---|---|---|---|---|---|
| (Hong Kong) Wong Ying Chi Virginia | 94:25 | 3 | 1.91 | 36 | 91.67 | 0 |
| (South Africa) Shaylene Swanepoel | 121:44 | 5 | 2.46 | 47 | 89.36 | 0 |
| (Hong Kong) Lee Jenny Kai-Chin | 85:35 | 6 | 4.21 | 49 | 87.76 | 0 |
| (Bulgaria) Vesela Krasteva | 165:00 | 22 | 8.00 | 136 | 83.82 | 0 |
| (Romania) Beáta Antal | 182:52 | 9 | 2.95 | 50 | 82.00 | 0 |

TOI = Time on Ice (minutes:seconds); SA = Shots against; GA = Goals against; GAA = Goals against average; Sv% = Save percentage; SO = Shutouts
Source: IIHF.com
