= 2019 IIHF Women's World Championship Division II =

International ice hockey tournament

Tournament details
- Host countries: Great Britain; Romania; South Africa
- Venues: 3 (in 3 host cities)
- Dates: 2–8 April 2019; 1–7 April 2019; 13–18 January 2019
- Teams: 17

The 2019 IIHF Women's World Championship Division II consisted of three international ice hockey tournaments organized by the International Ice Hockey Federation. Division II A, Division II B and Division II B Qualification represent the fourth, fifth and sixth tier of the IIHF Women's World Championship.

Slovenia earned promotion in Division II Group A; Chinese Taipei won the Division II Group B and Ukraine the qualification tournament, both teams got promoted for the next year, while Australia and Romania were relegated.

== Division II Group A ==
2019 IIHF Women's World Championship Division II A

Tournament details
- Host country: Great Britain
- City: Dumfries
- Venue: 1 (in 1 host city)
- Dates: 2–8 April 2019
- Teams: 6

Tournament statistics
- Games played: 15
- Goals scored: 84 (5.6 per game)
- Attendance: 5,501 (367 per game)
- Scoring leader: (Slovenia) Pia Pren (20 points)

Official website
- www.iihf.com

The Division II Group A tournament was played in Dumfries, Great Britain, from 2 to 8 April 2019.

=== Participating teams ===
Team	Qualification
Great Britain	Hosts; placed 2nd in Division II A last year.
North Korea	Placed 3rd in Division II A last year.
Australia	Placed 4th in Division II A last year.
Slovenia	Placed 5th in Division II A last year.
Mexico	Placed 6th in Division II A last year.
Spain	Placed 1st in Division II B last year and were promoted.

=== Match officials ===
4 referees and 7 linesmen were selected for the tournament.

Referees	Linesmen
(Australia) Ainslie Gardner; (Canada) Vanessa Morin; (China) Fu Zhennan; (Latvia) Sintija Čamane	(United Kingdom) Lorna Beresford; (United Kingdom) Amy Campbell; (Hong Kong) Wong Tsui Yi; (Kazakhstan) Oksana Shestakova; (Poland) Joanna Pobożniak; (Russia) Ekaterina Smirnova; (United States) Jennifer Cameron

=== Final standings ===
Pos	Team	Pld	W	OTW	OTL	L	GF	GA	GD	Pts	Promotion or relegation
1	Slovenia	5	3	1	1	0	24	11	+13	12	Promoted to the 2022 Division I B
2	Great Britain (H)	5	3	1	0	1	13	9	+4	11	
3	Spain	5	2	1	1	1	11	11	0	9	
4	Mexico	5	2	0	1	2	14	18	−4	7	
5	North Korea	5	1	1	1	2	12	13	−1	6	
6	Australia	5	0	0	0	5	10	22	−12	0	Relegated to the 2020 Division II B

Source: IIHF
Rules for classification: 1) points; 2) head-to-head points; 3) head-to-head goal difference; 4) head-to-head number of goals scored; 5) result against closest best-ranked team outside tied teams; 6) result against second-best-ranked team outside tied teams; 7) seeding before tournament.
(H) Host

=== Match results ===
All times are local (Western European Summer Time – UTC+1).

2 April 2019; 13:00	Spain	4–3 GWS (0–0, 1–2, 2–1) (OT: 0–0) (SO: 1–0)	Slovenia	Dumfries Ice Bowl, Dumfries; Attendance: 507

Game reference

Alba Gonzalo
Goalies
Pia Dukarič
Referee:
(China) Fu Zhennan
Linesmen:
(United Kingdom) Lorna Beresford
(Poland) Joanna Pobożniak

Sans (SH) – 24:06	1–0
	1–1	36:20 – Blazinšek (Confidenti, Pren) (PP)
	1–2	38:30 – Blazinšek (Lončar, Pren)
L. Abrisqueta (Álvarez, V. Abrisqueta) (PP) – 43:27	2–2
L. Abrisqueta (Ramos) (PP) – 47:37	3–2
	3–3	49:28 – Confidenti (Pren)

Rivera
Merino (miss)
Ramos (miss)
Senac Gómez (miss)
Shootout
(miss) Kraner
(miss) Blazinšek
(miss) Pren
(miss) Confidenti
(miss) E. Dukarič
12 min
Penalties
10 min
42
Shots
32

2 April 2019; 16:30	North Korea	2–4 (2–3, 0–1, 0–0)	Mexico	Dumfries Ice Bowl, Dumfries; Attendance: 192

Game reference

Ri Pom
Goalies
Mónica Rentería
Referee:
(Latvia) Sintija Čamane
Linesmen:
(United Kingdom) Amy Campbell
(Kazakhstan) Oksana Shestakova

Jong (Kim H., Hwang Chung-g.) – 02:38	1–0
Kim H. – 12:42	2–0
	2–1	14:54 – Téllez (J. Rojas)
	2–2	16:05 – J. Rojas (Cruz)
	2–3	18:39 – J. Rojas (Téllez, G. Rojas)
	2–4	33:06 – G. Rojas (Téllez)

4 min
Penalties
6 min
33
Shots
14

2 April 2019; 20:00	Australia	1–2 (0–1, 0–0, 1–1)	Great Britain	Dumfries Ice Bowl, Dumfries; Attendance: 462

Game reference

Michelle Coonan
Goalies
Nicole Jackson
Referee:
(Canada) Vanessa Morin
Linesmen:
(United States) Jennifer Cameron
(Russia) Ekaterina Smirnova

	0–1	15:34 – Scoon (Bloom)
	0–2	50:17 – A. Headland
Clark-Crumpton – 58:50	1–2

6 min
Penalties
4 min
19
Shots
32

4 April 2019; 13:00	North Korea	4–2 (1–0, 1–2, 2–0)	Australia	Dumfries Ice Bowl, Dumfries; Attendance: 452

Game reference

So Jong-sim
Goalies
Michelle Coonan
Referee:
(China) Fu Zhennan
Linesmen:
(United Kingdom) Amy Campbell
(Hong Kong) Wong Tsui Yi

Kim Un-j. (Hwang S.) – 01:32	1–0
	1–1	29:53 – Walker
Jang) – 31:44	2–1
	2–2	39:07 – Van der Wolf (Tihema)
Jong (SH) – 49:08	3–2
Jong (Choe) (PP) – 57:23	4–2

8 min
Penalties
6 min
28
Shots
30

4 April 2019; 16:30	Mexico	0–2 (0–1, 0–1, 0–0)	Spain	Dumfries Ice Bowl, Dumfries; Attendance: 271

Game reference
Mónica Rentería	Goalies	Alba Gonzalo	Referee: (Australia) Ainslie Gardner; Linesmen: (United Kingdom) Lorna Beresford (United States) Jennifer Cameron
0–1 / 02:48 – Muñoz (L. Danielsson); 0–2 / 36:49 – Muñoz (S. Danielsson, López)			Referee: (Australia) Ainslie Gardner; Linesmen: (United Kingdom) Lorna Beresford (United States) Jennifer Cameron
8 min	Penalties	12 min	Referee: (Australia) Ainslie Gardner; Linesmen: (United Kingdom) Lorna Beresford (United States) Jennifer Cameron
11	Shots	32	Referee: (Australia) Ainslie Gardner; Linesmen: (United Kingdom) Lorna Beresford (United States) Jennifer Cameron

4 April 2019; 20:00	Great Britain	2–4 (1–0, 0–1, 1–3)	Slovenia	Dumfries Ice Bowl, Dumfries; Attendance: 427

Game reference

Nicole Jackson
Goalies
Pia Dukarič
Referee:
(Latvia) Sintija Čamane
Linesmen:
(Poland) Joanna Pobożniak
(Kazakhstan) Oksana Shestakova

Culshaw – 19:36	1–0
	1–1	26:18 – Blazinšek (Lončar, Pren) (PP)
	1–2	40:34 – Confidenti (Pren) (PP)
	1–3	42:27 – Confidenti (Pren)
	1–4	52:34 – Pren (Confidenti)
Lane (Allen) – 56:36	2–4

8 min
Penalties
8 min
43
Shots
17

5 April 2019; 13:00	North Korea	2–1 GWS (0–0, 0–1, 1–0) (OT: 0–0) (SO: 1–0)	Spain	Dumfries Ice Bowl, Dumfries; Attendance: 350

Game reference
So Jong-sim	Goalies	Alba Gonzalo	Referee: (Latvia) Sintija Čamane; Linesmen: (United Kingdom) Lorna Beresford (United Kingdom) Amy Campbell
/ 0–1 / 23:35 – V. Abrisqueta (Ramos, Álvarez) (PP); Kim K. – 44:50 / 1–1			Referee: (Latvia) Sintija Čamane; Linesmen: (United Kingdom) Lorna Beresford (United Kingdom) Amy Campbell
Jong (miss); Rim (miss); Kim Un-j. Kim H. Choe (miss); Kim Un-j. (miss); Jong	Shootout	(miss) Rivera; (miss) Ramos; (miss) Muñoz; Merino; V. Abrisqueta; (miss) Rivera; (miss) V. Abrisqueta	Referee: (Latvia) Sintija Čamane; Linesmen: (United Kingdom) Lorna Beresford (United Kingdom) Amy Campbell
8 min	Penalties	8 min	Referee: (Latvia) Sintija Čamane; Linesmen: (United Kingdom) Lorna Beresford (United Kingdom) Amy Campbell
22	Shots	39	Referee: (Latvia) Sintija Čamane; Linesmen: (United Kingdom) Lorna Beresford (United Kingdom) Amy Campbell

5 April 2019; 16:30	Australia	1–6 (1–1, 0–3, 0–2)	Slovenia	Dumfries Ice Bowl, Dumfries; Attendance: 243

Game reference

Michelle Coonan
Keesha Atkins
Goalies
Pia Dukarič
Referee:
(Canada) Vanessa Morin
Linesmen:
(Poland) Joanna Pobożniak
(Russia) Ekaterina Smirnova

	0–1	05:55 – Blazinšek (Pren)
Van der Wolf (Clark-Crumpton) 10:50	1–1
	1–2	20:30 – Pren (Blazinšek)
	1–3	25:08 – Confidenti (Pren, Blazinšek) (PP)
	1–4	34:09 – Pren (Confidenti, Blazinšek)
	1–5	43:52 – Blazinšek (Pren, Confidenti)
	1–6	56:26 – Pren (Confidenti, Lončar)

8 min
Penalties
6 min
35
Shots
33

5 April 2019; 20:00	Great Britain	3–2 OT (0–0, 2–1, 0–1) (OT: 1–0)	Mexico	Dumfries Ice Bowl, Dumfries; Attendance: 485

Game reference

Samantha Bolwell
Goalies
Monica Renteria
Referee:
(Australia) Ainslie Gardner
Linesmen:
(United States) Jennifer Cameron
(Hong Kong) Wong Tsui Yi

	0–1	23:52 – Téllez (G. Rojas, J. Rojas)
Marsden (C. Headland) – 33:02	1–1
Allen (Pearson, Traill) – 35:19	2–1
	2–2	44:23 – G. Rojas (Téllez)
Lewis (Farman, Towns) (PP) – 61:02	3–2

4 min
Penalties
4 min
43
Shots
11

7 April 2019; 13:00	Mexico	7–4 (0–1, 3–1, 4–2)	Australia	Dumfries Ice Bowl, Dumfries; Attendance: 262

Game reference

Mónica Rentería
Goalies
Michelle Coonan
Referee:
(China) Fu Zhennan
Linesmen:
(United Kingdom) Lorna Beresford
(Hong Kong) Wong Tsui Yi

	0–1	11:45 – Godfrey (PP)
	0–2	20:20 – Clark-Crumpton (Tihema, Van der Wolf)
Larios (Amaya, Cardenas) – 24:23	1–2
Chávez (González, Téllez) (PP) – 27:16	2–2
González (Ayala, Téllez) (PP) – 34:31	3–2
J. Rojas (Téllez) – 47:31	4–2
G. Rojas (González, Cruz) – 48:15	5–2
	5–3	49:24 – Godfrey (Moore)
Ayala (Téllez) (PP2) – 51:14	6–3
Chávez (SH) – 55:35	7–3
	7–4	59:59 – Sammons (Matheson)

4 min
Penalties
14 min
24
Shots
27

7 April 2019; 16:30	Slovenia	4–3 GWS (1–1, 2–2, 0–0) (OT: 0–0) (SO: 1–0)	North Korea	Dumfries Ice Bowl, Dumfries; Attendance: 317

Game reference

Pia Dukarič
Goalies
So Jong-sim
Referee:
(Australia) Ainslie Gardner
Linesmen:
(United States) Jennifer Cameron
(United Kingdom) Amy Campbell

E. Dukarič (Breznik) – 01:30	1–0
	1–1	08:27 – Jong (Kim Un-h.)
Confidenti (Lončar, Pren) (SH) – 23:42	2–1
Confidenti (Blazinšek, Pren) – 28:57	3–1
	3–2	33:45 – Kim Un-h. (Choe) (SH)
	3–3	34:18 – Hwang S. (SH)

Pezdir
Blazinšek
Pren (miss)
Confidenti
E. Dukarič (miss)
Shootout
(miss) Jong
Kim H.
Kim Un-j.
(miss) Kim Un-h.
(miss) Hwang S.
8 min
Penalties
6 min
35
Shots
33

7 April 2019; 20:00	Spain	1–4 (1–0, 0–1, 0–3)	Great Britain	Dumfries Ice Bowl, Dumfries; Attendance: 487

Game reference

Alba Gonzalo
Goalies
Nicole Jackson
Referee:
(Canada) Vanessa Morin
Linesmen:
(Kazakhstan) Oksana Shestakova
(Russia) Ekaterina Smirnova

Moreno (Senac Gómez, Merino) – 05:02	1–0
	1–1	05:02 – A. Headland (Lane)
	1–2	43:57 – Allen (Bloom)
	1–3	55:42 – Marsden (Farman, Bloom) (PP)
	1–4	59:19 – Bloom (Ashton) (ENG)

6 min
Penalties
6 min
19
Shots
37

8 April 2019; 13:00	Slovenia	7–1 (4–1, 2–0, 1–0)	Mexico	Dumfries Ice Bowl, Dumfries; Attendance: 153

Game reference

Pia Dukarič
Goalies
Mónica Rentería
Referee:
(Australia) Ainslie Gardner
Linesmen:
(Kazakhstan) Oksana Shestakova
(Hong Kong) Wong Tsui Yi

	0–1	10:51 – Senac Gómez (Téllez) (PP)
Lončar (Pren, Blazinšek) (PP) – 14:59	1–1
Pren (Blazinšek, Lončar) – 16:44	2–1
Pren (Lončar, Porekar) – 17:30	3–1
Blazinšek (Confidenti, Pren) – 18:59	4–1
Blazinšek (Confidenti, Pren) – 36:56	5–1
Confidenti – 39:59	6–1
E. Dukarič (Pezdir) – 44:40	7–1

4 min
Penalties
4 min
26
Shots
23

8 April 2019; 16:30	Australia	2–3 (1–1, 1–0, 0–2)	Spain	Dumfries Ice Bowl, Dumfries; Attendance: 218

Game reference

Keesha Atkins
Goalies
Laura López
Referee:
(Latvia) Sintija Čamane
Linesmen:
(United Kingdom) Amy Campbell
(Russia) Ekaterina Smirnova

Van der Wolf (Clark-Crumpton) – 03:01	1–0
	1–1	14:04 – Senac Gómez (Muñoz, V. Abrisqueta) (PP)
McFadden (Sammons, Van der Wolf) (PP) – 38:57	2–1
	2–2	49:28 – Rivero (Moreno, L. López)
	2–3	58:30 – Ramos (Martin)

6 min
Penalties
8 min
21
Shots
24

8 April 2019; 20:00	Great Britain	2–1 (0–1, 2–0, 0–0)	North Korea	Dumfries Ice Bowl, Dumfries; Attendance: 675

Game reference

Nicole Jackson
Goalies
So Jong-sim
Referee:
(Canada) Vanessa Morin
Linesmen:
(United States) Jennifer Cameron
(Poland) Joanna Pobożniak

	0–1	02:59 – Jang (Kim H.)
Lane – 27:49	1–1
Douglas (Towns, Hill) – 34:40	2–1

4 min
Penalties
4 min
22
Shots
13

=== Awards and statistics ===
==== Awards ====
- Best players selected by the directorate:
  - Best Goalkeeper: (Slovenia) Pia Dukarič
  - Best Defenseman: (North Korea) Hwang Chung-gum
  - Best Forward: (Slovenia) Pia Pren

Source: IIHF.com

==== Scoring leaders ====
List shows the top skaters sorted by points, then goals.

Player	GP	G	A	Pts	+/−	PIM	POS
(Slovenia) Pia Pren	5	6	14	20	+12	0	F
(Slovenia) Sara Confidenti	5	7	7	14	+13	4	F
(Slovenia) Julija Blazinšek	5	7	6	13	+12	0	F
(Mexico) Claudia Téllez	5	2	8	10	−1	0	F
(Slovenia) Nina Lončar	5	1	6	7	+12	4	D
(Mexico) Joanna Rojas	5	4	2	6	0	2	F
(Mexico) Giovanna Rojas	5	3	2	5	+2	2	F
(Australia) Kristelle van der Wolf	5	3	2	5	−2	0	F
(North Korea) Jong Su-hyon	5	4	0	4	+3	2	F
(United Kingdom) Saffron Allen	5	2	2	4	+4	2	F
(Australia) Michelle Clark-Crumpton	5	2	2	4	−1	0	F

GP = Games played; G = Goals; A = Assists; Pts = Points; +/− = Plus/minus; PIM = Penalties in minutes; POS = Position
Source: IIHF.com

==== Leading goaltenders ====
Only the top five goaltenders, based on save percentage, who have played at least 40% of their team's minutes, are included in this list.

Player	TOI	GA	GAA	SA	Sv%	SO
(Slovenia) Pia Dukarič	310:00	10	1.94	175	94.29	0
(North Korea) So Jong-sim	289:21	9	1.87	133	93.23	0
(Spain) Alba Gonzalo	248:59	7	1.69	100	93.00	1
(United Kingdom) Nicole Jackson	238:31	7	1.76	68	89.71	0
(Mexico) Mónica Rentería	281:02	17	3.63	154	88.96	0

TOI = Time on ice (minutes:seconds); SA = Shots against; GA = Goals against; GAA = Goals against average; Sv% = Save percentage; SO = Shutouts
Source: IIHF.com

== Division II Group B ==
2019 IIHF Women's World Championship Division II B

Tournament details
- Host country: Romania
- City: Brașov
- Venue: 1 (in 1 host city)
- Dates: 1–7 April 2019
- Teams: 6

Tournament statistics
- Games played: 15
- Goals scored: 96 (6.4 per game)
- Attendance: 1,275 (85 per game)
- Scoring leader: (Iceland) Silvía Björgvinsdóttir (13 points)

Official website
- www.iihf.com

The Division II Group B tournament was played in Brașov, Romania, from 1 to 7 April 2019.

=== Participating teams ===
Team	Qualification
Chinese Taipei	Placed 2nd in Division II B last year.
Iceland	Placed 3rd in Division II B last year.
New Zealand	Placed 4th in Division II B last year.
Turkey	Placed 5th in Division II B last year.
Romania	Hosts; placed 6th in Division II B last year.
Croatia	Placed 1st in Division II B Qualification last year and were promoted.

=== Match officials ===
4 referees and 7 linesmen were selected for the tournament.

Referees	Linesmen
(China) Fu Yue; (Finland) Henna-Maria Koivuluoma; (Latvia) Agnese Kārkliņa; (United States) Kelly Cooke	(Germany) Julia Mannlein; (Italy) Jessica Brambilla; (Japan) Mai Mizuhori; (Norway) Bente Owren; (Russia) Anastasiia Kurashova; (Sweden) Julia Johansson; (Switzerland) Anne-Ruth Kuonen

=== Final standings ===
Pos	Team	Pld	W	OTW	OTL	L	GF	GA	GD	Pts	Promotion or relegation
1	Chinese Taipei	5	5	0	0	0	20	8	+12	15	Promoted to the 2022 Division II A
2	New Zealand	5	4	0	0	1	18	8	+10	12	
3	Iceland	5	3	0	0	2	21	12	+9	9	
4	Turkey	5	1	0	1	3	15	23	−8	4	
5	Croatia	5	1	0	0	4	7	18	−11	3	
6	Romania (H)	5	0	1	0	4	15	27	−12	2	Relegated to the 2020 Division III

Source: IIHF
Rules for classification: 1) points; 2) head-to-head points; 3) head-to-head goal difference; 4) head-to-head number of goals scored; 5) result against closest best-ranked team outside tied teams; 6) result against second-best-ranked team outside tied teams; 7) seeding before tournament.
(H) Host

=== Match results ===
All times are local (Eastern European Summer Time – UTC+3).

1 April 2019; 13:00	New Zealand	0–3 (0–1, 0–1, 0–1)	Chinese Taipei	Brașov Olympic Ice Rink, Brașov; Attendance: 25

Game reference

Lochlyn Hyde
Goalies
Hsu Tzu-ting
Referee:
(Finland) Henna-Maria Koivuluoma
Linesmen:
(Switzerland) Anne Ruth Kuonen
(Japan) Mai Mizuhori

0–1	16:17 – Teng (Hsu Ti.) (PP)
0–2	29:31 – Yeh
0–3	49:36 – Hsu Ti. (Pan) (PP)

6 min
Penalties
2 min
23
Shots
32

1 April 2019; 16:30	Croatia	3–6 (2–3, 0–0, 1–3)	Turkey	Brașov Olympic Ice Rink, Brașov; Attendance: 35

Game reference

Petra Belobrk
Goalies
Sera Doğramacı
Referee:
(Latvia) Agnese Kārkliņa
Linesmen:
(Sweden) Julia Johansson
(Germany) Julia Mannlein

Širanović (PP) – 03:59	1–0
E. Čavka (T. Čavka) – 05:48	2–0
	2–1	10:18 – Taygar (Baktıroğlu, Demirkol) (PP)
	2–2	11:29 – Baktıroğlu (D. Lökbaş)
	2–3	12:38 – Baktıroğlu (Uygun)
Širanović (Grašić, Delić) – 45:43	3–3
	3–4	49:25 – Taygar
	3–5	56:06 – Oğuz (Baktıroğlu)
	3–6	59:59 – Baktıroğlu (D. Lökbaş)

10 min
Penalties
18 min
25
Shots
47

1 April 2019; 20:00	Iceland	9–5 (3–1, 3–2, 3–2)	Romania	Brașov Olympic Ice Rink, Brașov; Attendance: 100

Game reference

Karítas Halldórsdóttir
Goalies
Nadina Niciu
Referee:
(United States) Kelly Cooke
Linesmen:
(Italy) Jessica Brambilla
(Russia) Anastasiia Kurashova

Si. Björgvinsdóttir (Su. Björgvinsdóttir) – 00:14	1–0
Si. Björgvinsdóttir (Su. Björgvinsdóttir) – 02:29	2–0
Árnadóttir (Leifsdóttir, Ingadóttir) – 03:11	3–0
	3–1	04:52 – Voicu (Balló) (PP)
	3–2	23:47 – Oprea (Popescu)
Ingadóttir (SH) – 28:29	4–2
Si. Björgvinsdóttir (Su. Björgvinsdóttir) (PP) – 31:22	5–2
	5–3	33:15 – Oprea (Sajtos)
Ingadóttir (Leifsdóttir, Kjartansdóttir) – 33:51	6–3
Snorradóttir (Si. Björgvinsdóttir) (PP) – 40:12	7–3
Kjartansdóttir (Si. Björgvinsdóttir) (PP) – 43:52	8–3
	8–4	44:23 – Balló (Csiszér, Voicu)
	8–5	50:37 – Oprea (Mathe)
Si. Björgvinsdóttir (Su. Björgvinsdóttir) – 53:15	9–5

22 min
Penalties
10 min
51
Shots
16

2 April 2019; 13:00	Chinese Taipei	5–3 (1–0, 1–1, 3–2)	Turkey	Brașov Olympic Ice Rink, Brașov; Attendance: 20

Game reference

Wang Yun-tzu
Goalies
Sera Doğramacı
Referee:
(China) Fu Yue
Linesmen:
(Sweden) Julia Johansson
(Russia) Anastasiia Kurashova

Hsu Ti.) – 08:25	1–0
	1–1	24:08 – Baktıroğlu
Yeh (Wang Hsu.) – 26:30	2–1
Yeh – 41:07	3–1
Teng (Liu C., Chang) – 43:45	4–1
	4–2	48:32 – Koçak (Uygun) (PP)
	4–3	53:17 – Baktıroğlu (Taygar)
Tao (Hsieh) – 54:24	5–3

6 min
Penalties
8 min
33
Shots
20

2 April 2019; 16:30	Iceland	1–2 (1–1, 0–0, 0–1)	New Zealand	Brașov Olympic Ice Rink, Brașov; Attendance: 30

Game reference

Karítas Halldórsdóttir
Goalies
Grace Harrison
Referee:
(Latvia) Agnese Kārkliņa
Linesmen:
(Italy) Jessica Brambilla
(Japan) Mai Mizuhori

Gardarsdóttir (Si. Björgvinsdóttir) – 00:33	1–0
	1–1	19:54 – Horner-Pascoe (Shields, Lilly) (PP)
	1–2	58:32 – Horner-Pascoe (PP)

20 min
Penalties
10 min
31
Shots
25

2 April 2019; 20:00	Romania	1–3 (0–2, 0–0, 1–1)	Croatia	Brașov Olympic Ice Rink, Brașov; Attendance: 100

Game reference

Andrea Kurko
Goalies
Petra Belobrk
Referee:
(Finland) Henna-Maria Koivuluoma
Linesmen:
(Switzerland) Anne-Ruth Kuonen
(Germany) Julia Mannlein

	0–1	02:29 – Širanović (Filipec) (PP)
	0–2	14:14 – Širanović (Smolec) (SH)
Oprea (PP) – 51:07	1–2
	1–3	59:36 – Širanović (SH, EN)

12 min
Penalties
12 min
24
Shots
30

4 April 2019; 13:00	Iceland	3–0 (0–0, 1–0, 2–0)	Croatia	Brașov Olympic Ice Rink, Brașov; Attendance: 30

Game reference

Telma Matthíasdóttir
Goalies
Petra Belobrk
Referee:
(China) Fu Yue
Linesmen:
(Italy) Jessica Brambilla
(Sweden) Julia Johansson

Si. Björgvinsdóttir (PP2) – 31:56	1–0
Árnadóttir (Su. Björgvinsdóttir) – 47:30	2–0
Si. Björgvinsdóttir (Garðarsdóttir) – 58:33	3–0

10 min
Penalties
14 min
50
Shots
14

4 April 2019; 16:30	New Zealand	4–2 (0–1, 4–0, 0–1)	Turkey	Brașov Olympic Ice Rink, Brașov; Attendance: 40

Game reference

Grace Harrison
Lochlyn Hyde
Goalies
Sera Doğramacı
Referee:
(United States) Kelly Cooke
Linesmen:
(Switzerland) Anne-Ruth Kuonen
(Norway) Bente Owren

	0–1	08:44 – Baktıroğlu (Uygun)
Shields (Horner-Pascoe) – 24:53	1–1
Horner-Pascoe – 32:37	2–1
Shields (Shattock) – 34:42	3–1
Shattock (Orr, Read) – 37:41	4–1
	4–2	42:09 – D. Lökbaş (Taygar)

8 min
Penalties
12 min
34
Shots
23

4 April 2019; 20:00	Chinese Taipei	4–3 (1–2, 1–1, 2–0)	Romania	Brașov Olympic Ice Rink, Brașov; Attendance: 150

Game reference

Wang Yun-tzu
Goalies
Nadina Niciu
Referee:
(Finland) Henna-Maria Koivuluoma
Linesmen:
(Russia) Anastasiia Kurashova
(Germany) Julia Mannlein

	0–1	06:08 – Voicu (Balló, Sajtos)
	0–2	10:35 – Voicu (Balló, Csiszér)
Liu C. (Hsu Ti., Teng) (PP) – 12:19	1–2
	1–3	21:33 – Voicu (Balló)
Liu C. (PP) – 22:25	2–3
Yeh (Hsu Ti., Jan) (PP) – 48:39	3–3
Pan (Yeh) (PP) – 54:14	4–3

10 min
Penalties
24 min
41
Shots
16

5 April 2019; 13:00	Turkey	0–6 (0–1, 0–2, 0–3)	Iceland	Brașov Olympic Ice Rink, Brașov; Attendance: 30

Game reference

Sera Doğramacı
Kübra Dadaşoğlu
Goalies
Karítas Halldórsdóttir
Referee:
(United States) Kelly Cooke
Linesmen:
(Sweden) Julia Johansson
(Japan) Mai Mizuhori

0–1	05:50 – Gardarsdóttir (Su. Björgvinsdóttir, Kjartansdóttir) (PP)
0–2	33:10 – Karvelsdóttir (Ingadóttir) (PP)
0–3	34:54 – Su. Björgvinsdóttir (Si. Björgvinsdóttir, Gardarsdóttir)
0–4	42:21 – Si. Björgvinsdóttir (Snorradóttir, Gardarsdóttir) (PP2)
0–5	45:58 – Si. Björgvinsdóttir (Su. Björgvinsdóttir)
0–6	59:02 – Hjaltested (Karvelsdóttir)

8 min
Penalties
4 min
22
Shots
39

5 April 2019; 16:30	Croatia	0–3 (0–2, 0–1, 0–0)	Chinese Taipei	Brașov Olympic Ice Rink, Brașov; Attendance: 35

Game reference

Petra Belobrk
Goalies
Hsu Tzu-ting
Wang Yun-tzu
Referee:
(Latvia) Agnese Kārkliņa
Linesmen:
(Italy) Jessica Brambilla
(Norway) Bente Owren

0–1	04:19 – Yeh (Hsieh)
0–2	04:44 – Hsu Ti. (Hsieh)
0–3	25:29 – Liu C. (EA)

8 min
Penalties
8 min
31
Shots
30

5 April 2019; 20:00	Romania	1–7 (0–2, 0–2, 1–3)	New Zealand	Brașov Olympic Ice Rink, Brașov; Attendance: 300

Game reference

Nadina Niciu
Goalies
Lochlyn Hyde
Referee:
(China) Fu Yue
Linesmen:
(Switzerland) Anne-Ruth Kuonen
(Russia) Anastasiia Kurashova

	0–1	07:00 – Shields (Horner-Pascoe)
	0–2	15:42 – Horner-Pascoe (Shields, Murray)
	0–3	26:02 – Shields (Jones) (PP)
	0–4	38:31 – Horner-Pascoe (Woodyear-Smith)
Balló – 44:17	1–4
	1–5	44:39 – Woodyear-Smith (Horner-Pascoe)
	1–6	55:20 – Murray (Horner-Pascoe)
	1–7	59:40 – Woodyear-Smith

2 min
Penalties
4 min
23
Shots
50

7 April 2019; 13:00	New Zealand	5–1 (0–0, 2–0, 3–1)	Croatia	Brașov Olympic Ice Rink, Brașov; Attendance: 20

Game reference

Lochlyn Hyde
Goalies
Petra Belobrk
Referee:
(Finland) Henna-Maria Koivuluoma
Linesmen:
(Russia) Anastasiia Kurashova
(Japan) Mai Mizuhori

Shattock (Woodyear-Smith, Gerken) (SH) – 28:42	1–0
Gregory (C. Heale) – 30:50	2–0
Fuller (Gerken) – 42:45	3–0
A. Heale (Horner-Pascoe) – 43:45	4–0
	4–1	48:06 – Smolec
Jones (Murray, Horner-Pascoe) – 51:54	5–1

6 min
Penalties
18 min
42
Shots
21

7 April 2019; 16:30	Chinese Taipei	5–2 (1–0, 2–1, 2–1)	Iceland	Brașov Olympic Ice Rink, Brașov; Attendance: 50

Game reference

Hsu Tzu-ting
Goalies
Karítas Halldórsdóttir
Referee:
(United States) Kelly Cooke
Linesmen:
(Germany) Julia Mannlein
(Norway) Bente Owren

Tao (Pan) – 14:33	1–0
	1–1	29:59 – Su. Björgvinsdóttir (Si. Björgvinsdóttir)
Hsieh (Hsu Ti.) – 30:27	2–1
Yeh – 39:08	3–1
	3–2	50:06 – Gardarsdóttir (Si. Björgvinsdóttir, Su. Björgvinsdóttir)
Yeh – 51:43	4–2
Tao (Lin) – 51:56	5–2

4 min
Penalties
10 min
38
Shots
38

7 April 2019; 20:00	Turkey	4–5 OT (3–1, 0–2, 1–1) (OT: 0–1)	Romania	Brașov Olympic Ice Rink, Brașov; Attendance: 300

Game reference

Sera Doğramacı
Goalies
Nadina Niciu
Referee:
(Latvia) Agnese Kārkliņa
Linesmen:
(Sweden) Julia Johansson
(Switzerland) Anne-Ruth Kuonen

Baktıroğlu (A. Lökbaş) (PP) – 04:19	1–0
	1–1	13:21 – Oprea (Popescu)
Baktıroğlu – 14:17	2–1
D. Lökbaş (Baktıroğlu) – 18:16	3–1
	3–2	20:59 – Balló (Adorján)
	3–3	22:16 – Voicu
	3–4	47:35 – Voicu (Balló)
D. Lökbaş – 49:32	4–4
	4–5	62:57 – Csiszér (Voicu) (PP)

8 min
Penalties
10 min
45
Shots
26

=== Awards and statistics ===
==== Awards ====
- Best players selected by the directorate:
  - Best Goalkeeper: (Chinese Taipei) Hsu Tzu-ting
  - Best Defenseman: (New Zealand) Krystie Woodyear-Smith
  - Best Forward: (Iceland) Silvia Björgvinsdóttir

Source: IIHF.com

==== Scoring leaders ====
List shows the top skaters sorted by points, then goals.

Player	GP	G	A	Pts	+/−	PIM	POS
(Iceland) Silvía Björgvinsdóttir	5	8	5	13	+5	0	F
(New Zealand) Jasmine Horner-Pascoe	5	6	6	12	+6	2	F
(Turkey) Çağla Baktıroğlu	5	8	3	11	+3	0	F
(Iceland) Sunna Björgvinsdóttir	5	2	9	11	+6	4	F
(Chinese Taipei) Yeh Hui-chen	5	7	1	8	+9	4	F
(Romania) Ana Voicu	5	6	2	8	−1	26	F
(Romania) Noémi Balló	5	3	5	8	0	0	F
(New Zealand) Hannah Shields (ice hockey)	5	4	3	7	+7	2	F
(Chinese Taipei) Hsu Ting-yu	5	3	4	7	+9	0	F
(Iceland) Kolbrun Gardarsdóttir	5	3	3	6	+6	4	F

GP = Games played; G = Goals; A = Assists; Pts = Points; +/− = Plus/minus; PIM = Penalties in minutes; POS = Position
Source: IIHF.com

==== Leading goaltenders ====
Only the top five goaltenders, based on save percentage, who have played at least 40% of their team's minutes, are included in this list.

Player	TOI	GA	GAA	SA	Sv%	SO
(Chinese Taipei) Hsu Tzu-ting	166:53	2	0.72	85	97.65	1
(New Zealand) Lochlyn Hyde	160:00	4	1.50	66	93.94	0
(New Zealand) Grace Harrison	138:24	4	1.73	64	93.75	0
(Croatia) Petra Belobrk	300:00	18	3.60	193	90.67	0
(Iceland) Karítas Halldórsdóttir	238:45	12	3.02	101	88.12	1

TOI = Time on ice (minutes:seconds); SA = Shots against; GA = Goals against; GAA = Goals against average; Sv% = Save percentage; SO = Shutouts
Source: IIHF.com

== Division II Group B Qualification ==
2019 IIHF Women's World Championship Division II B Qualification

Tournament details
- Host country: South Africa
- City: Cape Town
- Venue: 1 (in 1 host city)
- Dates: 13–18 January 2019
- Teams: 5

Tournament statistics
- Games played: 10
- Goals scored: 84 (8.4 per game)
- Attendance: 1,500 (150 per game)
- Scoring leader: (Belgium) Valerie Jenaer (13 points)

Official website
- www.iihf.com

The Division II Group B Qualification tournament was played in Cape Town, South Africa, from 13 to 18 January 2019.

=== Participating teams ===
Team	Qualification
Belgium	Placed 2nd in Division II B Qualification last year.
South Africa	Hosts; placed 3rd in Division II B Qualification last year.
Hong Kong	Placed 4th in Division II B Qualification last year.
Bulgaria	Placed 5th in Division II B Qualification last year.
Ukraine	First time participating in the World Championship.

=== Match officials ===
3 referees and 5 linesmen were selected for the tournament.

Referees	Linesmen
(Austria) Ulrike Winklmayr; (Norway) Rita Rygh; (South Africa) Nadine Sheffield	(Czech Republic) Michaela Hryzáková; (Czech Republic) Kamila Smetková; (France) Sueva Torribio; (Germany) Caroline Butt; (Singapore) Tsang Yin

=== Final standings ===
Pos	Team	Pld	W	OTW	OTL	L	GF	GA	GD	Pts	Promotion
1	Ukraine	4	4	0	0	0	17	5	+12	12	Promoted to the 2020 Division II B
2	Belgium	4	3	0	0	1	24	7	+17	9	
3	South Africa (H)	4	2	0	0	2	21	17	+4	6	
4	Hong Kong	4	0	1	0	3	11	29	−18	2	
5	Bulgaria	4	0	0	1	3	11	26	−15	1	

Source: IIHF
Rules for classification: 1) points; 2) head-to-head points; 3) head-to-head goal difference; 4) head-to-head number of goals scored; 5) result against closest best-ranked team outside tied teams; 6) result against second-best ranked team outside tied teams; 7) seeding before tournament.
(H) Host

=== Match results ===
All times are local (South African Standard Time – UTC+2).

13 January 2019; 14:00	Hong Kong	1–8 (1–3, 0–4, 0–1)	Belgium	The Ice Station, Cape Town; Attendance: 50

Game reference

Chau Nga Sze
Goalies
Maud Smits
Referee:
(South Africa) Nadine Sheffield
Linesmen:
(Germany) Caroline Butt
(Singapore) Tsang Yin

Ip (SH) – 02:52	1–0
	1–1	04:13 – Jenaer (Bosmans)
	1–2	07:38 – Leirs (Fransen)
	1–3	13:32 – Jenaer (Willemot)
	1–4	20:21 – Leyen (Jenaer, Bosmans)
	1–5	25:55 – Clincke (Frere)
	1–6	31:32 – De Guchtenaere (Bosmans) (PP)
	1–7	35:21 – Jenaer (De Guchtenaere)
	1–8	54:55 – Maka (De Guchtenaere, Van Hootegem)

10 min
Penalties
18 min
14
Shots
50

13 January 2019; 19:00	Ukraine	3–1 (1–1, 2–0, 0–0)	South Africa	The Ice Station, Cape Town; Attendance: 400

Game reference

Viktoriia Tkachenko
Goalies
Shaylene Swanepoel
Referee:
(Norway) Rita Rygh
Linesmen:
(Czech Republic) Kamila Smetková
(France) Sueva Torribio

Skashchuk (Riabkina, Tsymyrenko) – 12:48	1–0
	1–1	19:18 – Van Doesburgh (Rhode, Verwey) (PP2)
Skashchuk (Riabkina) (PP) – 24:28	2–1
Tsymyrenko (Dobrovolska, Skashchuk) – 32:57	3–1

14 min
Penalties
14 min
34
Shots
15

14 January 2019; 18:00	Bulgaria	1–5 (0–3, 0–0, 1–2)	Ukraine	The Ice Station, Cape Town; Attendance: 40

Game reference

Katrin Stankova
Goalies
Viktoriia Tkachenko
Referee:
(Austria) Ulrike Winklmayr
Linesmen:
(Czech Republic) Michaela Hryzáková
(France) Sueva Torribio

	0–1	10:08 – Dobrovolska (Riabkina, Tkachuk) (PP)
	0–2	12:46 – Tsymyrenko (Skashchuk, Tarasova)
	0–3	14:29 – Tkachuk (Riabkina)
Zareva (Iliycheva, Metanova) – 41:11	1–3
	1–4	51:05 – Tkachuk (Riabkina, Dobrovolska) (PP)
	1–5	51:05 – Makarenko

6 min
Penalties
12 min
16
Shots
40

15 January 2019; 14:00	Belgium	6–0 (4–0, 0–0, 2–0)	Bulgaria	The Ice Station, Cape Town; Attendance: 40

Game reference

Maud Smits
Goalies
Paulina Georgieva
Referee:
(Norway) Rita Rygh
Linesmen:
(Czech Republic) Kamila Smetková
(Singapore) Tsang Yin

Jenaer (De Guchtenaere, Bosmans) (PP) – 05:07	1–0
Clincke (SH) – 13:16	2–0
Jenaer (De Guchtenaere, Bosmans) – 18:35	3–0
Willemot (Boon) – 19:38	4–0
Boon (Frere) – 47:37	5–0
De Guchtenaere (PP) – 59:43	6–0

10 min
Penalties
22 min
51
Shots
9

15 January 2019; 18:00	South Africa	10–1 (4–1, 3–0, 3–0)	Hong Kong	The Ice Station, Cape Town; Attendance: 200

Game reference

Shaylene Swanepoel
Rachel van der Merwe
Goalies
Virginia Wong
Chau Nga Sze
Referee:
(Austria) Ulrike Winklmayr
Linesmen:
(Germany) Caroline Butt
(Czech Republic) Michaela Hryzáková

Van Doesburgh (PP) – 03:28	1–0
Rhode (Gruber) – 04:12	2–0
Keuler (Van Doesburgh) (PP) – 05:41	3–0
	3–1	06:46 – Ip (Li) (SH)
Rhode (Van Doesburgh, Brankin) – 14:00	4–1
Van Doesburgh (Langeveld, Kleyn) – 31:05	5–1
Brankin (SH) – 32:44	6–1
Rhode – 35:40	7–1
Rhode (Grobler) – 41:33	8–1
Rhode (Keuler, Schuurman) (PP) – 49:32	9–1
Van Doesburgh (Schuurman) (PP) – 51:02	10–1

6 min
Penalties
16 min
40
Shots
11

16 January 2019; 18:00	Ukraine	4–1 (2–0, 1–1, 1–0)	Belgium	The Ice Station, Cape Town; Attendance: 100

Game reference

Viktoriia Tkachenko
Goalies
Maud Smits
Referee:
(Norway) Rita Rygh
Linesmen:
(Germany) Caroline Butt
(France) Sueva Torribio

Skashchuk (Tkachuk) (PP) – 12:17	1–0
Kovitun (Hadliia) – 15:14	2–0
	2–1	30:53 – Jenaer (De Guchtenaere)
Tkachuk (Hadliia) – 33:18	3–1
Skashchuk – 42:52	4–1

16 min
Penalties
12 min
33
Shots
16

17 January 2019; 14:00	Hong Kong	2–5 (1–2, 1–3, 0–0)	Ukraine	The Ice Station, Cape Town; Attendance: 30

Game reference

Chau Nga Sze
Goalies
Viktoriia Tkachenko
Iryna Zaichenko
Referee:
(South Africa) Nadine Sheffield
Linesmen:
(Czech Republic) Michaela Hryzáková
(Singapore) Tsang Yin

	0–1	01:54 – Riabkina (Kozub)
	0–2	17:30 – Kovtun
Ip (Li, Lau) – 18:26	1–2
Kwok (Ip) (PP) – 28:19	2–2
	2–3	28:38 – Riabkina (Slashchova, Vansovych)
	2–4	30:59 – Dobrovolska (Tkachuk, Skashchuk)
	2–5	35:51 – Kozub (Riabkina, Vansovych)

8 min
Penalties
10 min
17
Shots
33

17 January 2019; 18:00	South Africa	8–4 (3–1, 1–2, 4–1)	Bulgaria	The Ice Station, Cape Town; Attendance: 200

Game reference

Shaylene Swanepoel
Goalies
Katrin Stankova
Referee:
(Austria) Ulrike Winklmayr
Linesmen:
(Czech Republic) Kamila Smetková
(France) Sueva Torribio

Verwey (Van Doesburgh) (PP) – 01:52	1–0
Van Doesburgh (Schuurman, Rhode) – 03:27	2–0
	2–1	06:50 – Metanova (Iliycheva)
Schuurman – 19:24	3–1
	3–2	24:39 – Metanova (Zareva)
Rhode (Schuurman, Van Doesburgh) (PP) – 36:00	4–2
	4–3	36:49 – Metanova
	4–4	44:21 – Metanova
Keuler (Rhode) (PP) – 49:35	5–4
Gruber (Van Doesburgh, Rhode) (PP) – 53:28	6–4
Verwey – 59:08	7–4
Rhode (Gruber, Keuler) – 59:42	8–4

4 min
Penalties
16 min
50
Shots
17

18 January 2019; 14:00	Bulgaria	6–7 OT (1–3, 2–0, 3–3) (OT: 0–1)	Hong Kong	The Ice Station, Cape Town; Attendance: 40

Game reference

Paulina Georgieva
Goalies
Chau Nga-sze
Referee:
(South Africa) Nadine Sheffield
Linesmen:
(Czech Republic) Kamila Smetková
(Singapore) Tsang Yin

	0–1	00:50 – Li (Ip)
	0–2	09:39 – Li (Lau)
Zareva (Metanova, Popova) – 11:00	1–2
	1–3	11:52 – Li (Ip)
Dimitrova (PP) – 29:15	2–3
Metanova (Zareva, Popova) – 37:06	3–3
	3–4	40:56 – Ip (SH)
	3–5	47:43 – Ip (Li) (PP)
	3–6	49:16 – Li (Kwok) (PP)
Todorova (Dilova) (PP) – 52:21	4–6
Metanova (PP) – 56:08	5–6
Metanova (Zareva) – 57:56	6–6
	6–7	60:25 – Kwok (Lee) (PP2)

16 min
Penalties
16 min
25
Shots
25

18 January 2019; 18:00	Belgium	9–2 (3–0, 3–1, 3–1)	South Africa	The Ice Station, Cape Town; Attendance: 400

Game reference

Maud Smits
Goalies
Shaylene Swanepoel
Referee:
(Norway) Rita Rygh
Linesmen:
(Germany) Caroline Butt
(Czech Republic) Michaela Hryzáková

Bosmans (Jenaer, Vetters) – 10:46	1–0
Leyen (De Guchtenaere) (PP) – 12:58	2–0
De Guchtenaere (Bosmans, Jenaer) (PP) – 16:17	3–0
De Guchtenaere (Bosmans, Jenaer) – 28:19	4–0
Bosmans (Jenaer, De Guchtenaere) – 31:23	5–0
	5–1	31:58 – Schuurman (Rhode, Keuler) (PP)
Jenaer (Maka, Horemans) – 36:07	6–1
	6–2	43:27 – Van Doesburgh (PP)
Jenaer (Bosmans) – 47:08	7–2
Boon (Frere) – 55:43	8–2
Clincke (Moonen, Boon) (PP) – 59:01	9–2

14 min
Penalties
16 min
35
Shots
13

=== Awards and statistics ===
==== Awards ====
- Best players selected by the directorate:
  - Best Goalkeeper: (Ukraine) Viktoriia Tkachenko
  - Best Defenseman: (South Africa) Donne van Doesburgh
  - Best Forward: (Belgium) Lotte De Guchtenaere

Source: IIHF.com

==== Scoring leaders ====
List shows the top skaters sorted by points, then goals.

Player	GP	G	A	Pts	+/−	PIM	POS
(Belgium) Valerie Jenaer	4	8	5	13	+11	2	F
(South Africa) Dalene Rhode	4	7	5	12	−2	10	F
(South Africa) Donne van Doesburgh	4	6	5	11	+2	2	D
(Belgium) Lotte De Guchtenaere	4	4	7	11	+10	4	F
(Belgium) Femke Bosmans	4	2	8	10	+9	16	F
(Bulgaria) Veronika Metanova	4	7	2	9	+1	8	F
(Hong Kong) Estelle Ip	4	5	3	8	+2	2	F
(Ukraine) Ielyzaveta Riabkina	4	2	6	8	+6	4	F
(Hong Kong) Adrienne Li	4	4	3	7	0	0	D
(Ukraine) Vladyslava Skashchuk	4	4	3	7	+3	0	F

GP = Games played; G = Goals; A = Assists; Pts = Points; +/− = Plus/minus; PIM = Penalties in minutes; POS = Position
Source: IIHF.com

==== Leading goaltenders ====
Only the top five goaltenders, based on save percentage, who have played at least 40% of their team's minutes, are included in this list.

Player	TOI	GA	GAA	SA	Sv%	SO
(Ukraine) Viktoriia Tkachenko	232:15	5	1.29	60	91.67	0
(Belgium) Maud Smits	240:00	7	1.75	69	89.86	1
(Bulgaria) Katrin Stankova	130:24	14	6.44	94	85.11	0
(South Africa) Shaylene Swanepoel	162:58	10	3.48	66	84.85	0
(Bulgaria) Paulina Georgieva	109:16	12	6.59	72	83.33	0

TOI = Time on ice (minutes:seconds); SA = Shots against; GA = Goals against; GAA = Goals against average; Sv% = Save percentage; SO = Shutouts
Source: IIHF.com
