= Romania women's national ice hockey team =

Romania
- The Coat of arms of Romania is the badge used on the players jerseys.
- Nickname: Tricolori
- Association: Romanian Ice Hockey Federation
- General manager: Erika Sandor
- Head coach: Zoltan Lang
- Assistants: András Varga
- Captain: Timea Csiszér
- Most games: Magdolna Popescu (54)
- Top scorer: Ana Voicu (38)
- Most points: Magdolna Popescu (69)
- Team colors
- IIHF code: ROU

Ranking
- Current IIHF: 37 (▲1) (3 June 2026)
- Highest IIHF: 25 (first in 2003)
- Lowest IIHF: 40 (2022)

First international
- Netherlands 14–1 Romania (Bucharest, Romania; 5 March 2001)

Biggest win
- Romania 27–0 Turkey (Miercurea-Ciuc, Romania; 26 March 2007)

Biggest defeat
- Italy 15–0 Romania (Bucharest, Romania; 8 March 2001)

World Championships
- Appearances: 16 (first in 2003)
- Best result: 25th (2001)

International record (W–L–T)
- 30–51–0

The Romanian women's national ice hockey team represents Romania at the International Ice Hockey Federation's IIHF World Women's Championships. The women's national team is controlled by Romanian Ice Hockey Federation. As of 2015, Romania has 53 female players. The Romanian women's national team is ranked 39th in the world.

== History ==
The Romanian women's national team made their debut at the 2001 Women's World Ice Hockey Championships. They finished 9th out of ten in the qualification event for Division II and thus entered the newly founded Division III in the following year. At the 2004 Women's World Championship, they were relegated to Division IV, which is where they have been competing since then. As the lower divisions saw no match play in 2009, and there was no IIHF World Women's Championship in the Olympic year 2010, the Romanian team will play their first World Championship match in three years at the 2011 IIHF Women's World Championship.

== Olympic record ==
The Romanian women's hockey team has never qualified for an Olympic tournament.

== World Championship record ==
- 2001 – Finished in 25th place (9th in Division I qualification)
- 2003 – Finished in 26th place (6th in Division III)
- 2004 – Finished in 26th place (5th in Division III)
- 2005 – Finished in 29th place (3rd in Division IV)
- 2007 – Finished in 29th place (2nd in Division IV)
- 2008 – Finished in 30th place (3rd in Division IV)
- 2009 – Division IV cancelled
- 2011 – Finished in 30th place (4th in Division IV)
- 2016 – Finished in 33rd place (1st in Division IIB qualification, promoted to Division IIB)
- 2017 – Finished in 32nd place (6th in Division IIB)
- 2018 – Finished in 33rd place (6th in Division IIB)
- 2019 – Finished in 34th place (6th in Division IIB, relegated to Division IIBQ)
- 2020 – Finished in 37th place (3rd in Division III)
- 2021 – Cancelled due to the COVID-19 pandemic
- 2022 – Withdrawn due to the COVID-19 pandemic
- 2023 – Finished in 36th place (4th in Division IIIA)
- 2024 – Finished in 36th place (2nd in Division IIIA)
- 2025 – Finished in 36th place (4th in Division IIIA)
- 2026 – Finished in 35th place (1st in Division IIIA, promoted to Division IIB)

== All-time record against other nations ==
As of 14 September 2011

Team	GP	W	T	L	GF	GA
Turkey	2	2	0	0	36	1
Estonia	2	2	0	0	13	3
Iceland	4	2	0	2	12	9
South Africa	4	2	0	2	13	12
South Korea	3	1	0	2	7	9
New Zealand	4	1	0	3	9	21
Croatia	1	0	0	1	2	3
Australia	1	0	0	1	1	9
Netherlands	1	0	0	1	1	14
Italy	1	0	0	1	0	15
Slovenia	2	0	0	2	1	12
Austria	2	0	0	2	0	18
Belgium	3	0	0	3	1	16
Hungary	4	0	0	4	9	15
