= Turkey women's national ice hockey team =

Turkey
- The crescent moon and a star as seen on the Turkish flag is the badge used on the players jerseys.
- Nickname: Buzun perileri ("Fairies of the Ice")
- Association: Turkish Ice Hockey Federation
- General manager: Eray Atalı
- Head coach: Daniel Reja
- Assistants: Alper Solak; Sefa Takar
- Captain: Sena Yavuz
- Most games: Betül Taygar (57)
- Top scorer: Çağla Baktıroğlu (40)
- Most points: Çağla Baktıroğlu (61)
- IIHF code: TUR

Ranking
- Current IIHF: 31 (▼2) (3 June 2026)
- Highest IIHF: 27 (first in 2018)
- Lowest IIHF: 35 (2012)

First international
- Romania 27–0 Turkey (Miercurea-Ciuc, Romania; 27 March 2007)

Biggest win
- Turkey 11–3 Bulgaria (Hong Kong; 18 February 2015)

Biggest defeat
- Finland 32–0 Turkey (Erzurum, Turkey; 31 January 2011)

World Championships
- Appearances: 15 (first in 2007)
- Best result: 29th (2022)

International record (W–L–T)
- 23–56–0

The Turkish women's national ice hockey team represents Turkey at the International Ice Hockey Federation's World Women's Ice Hockey Championship Division IV. The women's national team, established in late 2006, is controlled by Turkish Ice Hockey Federation (Turkish: Türkiye Buz Hokeyi Federasyonu, TBHF). As of 2011, Turkey has 160 female players. The Turkish women's national team is ranked 33rd in the world.

== History ==
The Turkish women team made its first appearance at the 2007 Women's World Championships Division IV tournament held between 26 March through 1 April in Miercurea Ciuc, Romania.

Women's ice hockey sport in Turkey began in 2005 with the forming of women's clubs in Ankara. The first official competitions were a cup and a tournament held in 2006. The first women's ice hockey league started on 17 February 2007 with the participation of 6 teams from Ankara and one team from Kocaeli.

The national team was selected following national team camps. The first team coach was Canadian Clive R. Tolley from Moose Jaw, Saskatchewan, who has assumed the head coach duties for the Turkish senior men's, juniors' (under 20) and espoir (under 18) teams for 4 years term with a trial period of January–June 2007.

== Tournament record ==
=== Olympics ===
The Turkey women's hockey team has never qualified for an Olympic tournament.

=== World Championship ===
The Turkish squad made its international debut at the World Championship held in Miercurea Ciuc, Romania between 26 March through 1 April, playing in the Division IV, which got together from the teams of Romania, Estonia, New Zealand, Iceland and Croatia besides of Turkey.

The women's team played its first match against the host team Romania and was defeated by 27–0 (7–0, 11–0, 9–0). Turkish women lost their second match to Estonia with 1–14 (0–6, 0–5, 1–3), while Elif Ulaş scored the national team's first ever goal in the history. The third match was lost to New Zealand with 19–0 (9–0, 6–0, 4–0). Turkey was defeated in its 4th match by Iceland with 1–12 (0–3, 0–3, 1–6). The only Turkish goal was scored by İrem Ayan. The women's squad lost against Croatia with 1–19. The team ranked last (6th).

- 2007 – 33rd place (6th in Division IV)
- 2008 – 33rd place (6th in Division IV)
- 2009 – The Division III, Division IV and Division V were not played, as the respective tournaments were cancelled.
- 2011 – 34th place (5th in Division V)
- 2013 – 33rd place (1st in Division IIB qualification, promoted to Division IIB)
- 2014 – 33rd place (6th in Division IIB, relegated to Division IIB qualification)
- 2015 – 33rd place (1st in Division IIB qualification, promoted to Division IIB)
- 2016 – 32nd place (6th in Division IIB)
- 2017 – 31st place (5th in Division IIB)
- 2018 – 31st place (5th in Division IIB)
- 2019 – 32nd place (4th in Division IIB)
- 2020 – 32nd place (4th in Division IIB)
- 2021 – Cancelled due to the COVID-19 pandemic
- 2022 – 29th place (3rd in Division IIB)
- 2023 – Withdrawn due to the 2023 Turkey–Syria earthquake
- 2024 – 33rd place (5th in Division IIB)
- 2025 – 34th place (6th in Division IIB, relegated to Division IIIA))
- 2026 – 37th place (5th in Division IIIA)

== All-time Record against other nations ==
As of 6 March 2015

Team	WR	GP	W	OTW	OTL	L	WLDiff	GF	GA	GDiff
Bulgaria	34	5	4	0	0	1	+3	24	10	+14
Ireland	37	2	2	0	0	0	+2	10	1	+9
Hong Kong	36	1	1	0	0	0	+1	4	1	+3
South Africa	32	2	1	0	0	1	0	9	12	−3
Belgium	31	1	0	0	1	0	−1	1	2	−1
Mexico	35	1	0	0	0	1	−1	1	6	−5
Australia	29	1	0	0	0	1	−1	0	12	−12
Poland	22	1	0	0	0	1	−1	0	14	−14
Estonia	39	2	0	0	0	2	−2	2	22	−20
Croatia	25	2	0	0	0	2	−2	2	24	−22
Romania	38	2	0	0	0	2	−2	1	36	−35
Spain	26	3	0	0	0	3	−3	4	21	−17
New Zealand	28	3	0	0	0	3	−3	4	42	−38
Iceland	30	4	0	0	0	4	−4	5	31	−26
Slovenia	24	4	0	0	0	4	−4	3	31	−28
Total	33	34	8	0	1	25	-18	70	265	-195

== Notable former players ==
- Mine Güngör
- Ceren Alkan
- Sinem Doğu
- Merve Arıncı
- Simge Ozer-Sevilmiş
- Huriye Yeliz Yüksel
- Maria Jasmina Decu
- Selin Erenoğlu
- İrem Ayan
- Teksin Öztekin
- Tanay Günay
- Çisel Ann Otts
- Tuba Dokur
- Burcu Turanal
