= Iceland women's national ice hockey team =

Iceland
- Nickname: Íslenska Falcons (Icelandic Falcons)
- Association: Ice Hockey Iceland
- Head coach: Jón Gíslason
- Captain: Sunna Björgvinsdóttir
- Most games: Anna Ágústsdóttir (75)
- Top scorer: Silvía Björgvinsdóttir (51)
- Most points: Silvía Björgvinsdóttir (79)
- IIHF code: ISL

Ranking
- Current IIHF: 27 (3 June 2026)
- Highest IIHF: 27 (first in 2022)
- Lowest IIHF: 32 (first in 2018)

First international
- South Korea 8–2 Iceland (Dunedin, New Zealand; 1 April 2005)

Biggest win
- Iceland 12–1 Turkey (Miercurea Ciuc, Romania; 30 March 2007); Iceland 12–1 Romania (Valdemoro, Spain; 21 March 2018)

Biggest defeat
- Slovakia 15–1 Iceland (Piešťany, Slovakia; 13 December 2024)

World Championships
- Appearances: 18 (first in 2005)
- Best result: 27th (2022, 2023)

International record (W–L–T)
- 44–47–1

The Icelandic women's national ice hockey team represents Iceland at the International Ice Hockey Federation's World Women's Ice Hockey Championship Division IIB. The women's national team is controlled by Ice Hockey Iceland. As of 2011, Iceland had 71 female players. The Icelandic women's national team is ranked 29th in the world.

== Olympic record ==
The Icelandic women's hockey team has never qualified for an Olympic tournament.

== World Championships record ==
In 2005 the Icelandic Women team was the first time involved in the World Championship competition.

- 2005 – Finished in 30th place (4th in Division IV)
- 2007 – Finished in 32nd place (5th in Division IV)
- 2008 – Finished in 28th place (1st in Division IV, Promoted to Division III)
- 2009 – Division III canceled
- 2011 – Finished in 28th place (3rd in Division IV)
- 2012 – Finished in 30th place (4th in Division IIB)
- 2013 – Finished in 30th place (4th in Division IIB)
- 2014 – Finished in 30th place (4th in Division IIB)
- 2015 – Finished in 30th place (4th in Division IIB)
- 2016 – Finished in 29th place (3rd in Division IIB)
- 2017 – Finished in 30th place (4th in Division IIB)
- 2018 – Finished in 30th place (3rd in Division IIB)
- 2019 – Finished in 31st place (3rd in Division IIB)
- 2020 – Finished in 30th place (2nd in Division IIB)
- 2021 – Cancelled due to the COVID-19 pandemic
- 2022 – Finished in 27th place (1st in Division IIB, Promoted to Division IIA)
- 2023 – Finished in 27th place (5th in Division IIA)
- 2024 – Finished in 27th place (5th in Division IIA)
- 2025 – Finished in 25th place (3rd in Division IIA)
- 2026 – Finished in 27th place (5th in Division IIA)

== All-time record against other nations ==
As of 14 September 2011

Team	GP	W	T	L	GF	GA
New Zealand	4	2	1	1	20	8
Turkey	2	2	0	0	21	1
South Africa	2	2	0	0	14	2
Romania	4	2	0	2	9	12
Estonia	3	1	0	2	8	12
Croatia	1	0	0	1	0	3
South Korea	2	0	0	2	3	12
