= Kim Hyang-mi =

Kim Hyang-mi may refer to:

- Kim Hyang-mi (table tennis)
- Kim Hyang-mi (ice hockey)
