= Grace Harrison =

New Zealand ice hockey player

- Born: 11 May 1997 (age 29) Auckland, New Zealand
- Height: 5 ft 9 in (175 cm)
- Catches: Left
- NZIHL team: Botany Swarm
- Played for: Toronto Leaside Wildcats (PWHL); Ontario Hockey Academy; St. Lawrence Saints (NCAA)
- National team: New Zealand
- Playing career: 2014–present
Medal record
IIHF World Women's Championship
| Silver medal – second place | 2019 Romania, Group B |

Grace Harrison (born 11 May 1997) is a New Zealand women's ice hockey goaltender and member of the New Zealand national team. Currently, her club team is the Botany Swarm of the New Zealand Ice Hockey League, where she was one of only two women that competed in the league during its 2021 season.

== Playing career ==
Harrison spent one season with the PWHL's Toronto Leaside Wildcats, part of a joint program between New Zealand’s national team program.

=== NCAA ===
Standing between the pipes for the St. Lawrence Skating Saints women's ice hockey, she made 19 starts as a freshman, posting a 7–7–6 won-loss mark. With overall numbers including a 2.14 goals against average (GAA) and a .916 save percentage, said numbers were stronger in ECAC Conference play, recording a 1.65 GAA and a .932 save percentage. Her first career shutout came on 15 January 2016, blanking the Ivy League’s Harvard Crimson. Facing off against the Harvard Crimson, the opposing goaltender was Emerance Maschmeyer, who would go on to play with the Canadian national team. Of note, Maschmeyer matched Harrison in terms of saves, both recording 24.

In her sophomore season (2016–17), Harrison set a new program record for most shutouts in one season with nine. She would post a career high in wins, leading the Saints to 23 victories, appearing in 33 games, another career high. Graduating in 2019, she ranked second all-time in shutouts (16), goals against average (1.92) and fourth in wins (49)

During January 2019, Harrison led the NCAA in both goals against average (0.76) and save percentage (.970). Enjoying her best success against Ivy League teams, including wins against Yale and Dartmouth, she recorded 29 saves in a scintillating scoreless tie versus the Harvard Crimson. Facing 101 shots during the month, recording an astounding 98 saves.

=== Professional ===
Having first appeared for the Botany Swarm of the New Zealand Ice Hockey League (NZIHL) in 2016, she joined the team full time following her graduation from St. Lawrence. During the 2021 season, she would make four appearances, winning two games. One of only two women to play in the league during the 2021 NZIHL season, the other was Lilly Forbes with the Canterbury Red Devils. Her older brother Shaun Harrison also plays in the league.

=== International ===
During her time with the New Zealand national team, Harrison was named team captain in 2014–15. At the 2019 IIHF World Championships Division II in Romania, Harrison led New Zealand to a silver medal. In her first three tournament appearances for New Zealand, she posted a 1.73 goals against average and a .938 save percentage, highlighted by a 30-save performance in a 2–1 win over Iceland.

== Career stats ==
| | | | Regular season |
| Season | Team | League | GP | MIN | GA | GAA | SV | SV% | W | L | T | SO |
|---|---|---|---|---|---|---|---|---|---|---|---|---|
| 2015–16 | St. Lawrence | ECAC (NCAA) | 21 | 1152:05 | 41 | 2.14 | 445 | .916 | 7 | 7 | 6 | 3 |
| 2016–17 | St. Lawrence | ECAC | 33 | 1960:57 | 53 | 1.62 | 631 | .923 | 23 | 6 | 4 | 9 |
| 2017–18 | St. Lawrence | ECAC | 19 | 1144:19 | 37 | 1.94 | 368 | .909 | 10 | 6 | 3 | 2 |
| 2018–19 | St. Lawrence | ECAC | 23 | 1265:05 | 46 | 2.18 | 547 | .922 | 9 | 7 | 5 | 2 |
| NCAA totals | | | 96 | 5522:26 | 177 | 1.92 | 1991 | .918 | 49 | 26 | 18 | 16 |

== Awards and honors ==
=== NCAA ===
- 2016–17 Second-Team All-ECAC Hockey
- 2016–17 Finalist for ECAC Hockey Goaltender of the Year award
- ECAC Hockey Goaltender of the Month (November 2016)
- ECAC Hockey Goaltender of the Week (1 Nov 8 Nov 23 and 29 November 2016)
- 2017–18 ECAC Hockey All-Academic honors
- 2018–19 ECAC Hockey All-Academic honors
- ECAC Goaltender of the Month (January 2019)
- Women's Hockey Commissioners Association Division I Goaltender of the Month for January 2019
