= British hockey team =

British hockey team may refer to:

- Great Britain men's national field hockey team
- Great Britain women's national field hockey team
- Great Britain men's national ice hockey team
- Great Britain women's national ice hockey team
