= Great Britain women's national hockey team =

Great Britain women's national hockey team may refer to:

- Great Britain women's national field hockey team
- Great Britain women's national ice hockey team
