= 2021 IIHF Women's World Championship Division II =

Tournament details
- Host countries: Spain; Croatia
- Venues: 2 (in 2 host cities)
- Dates: 10–16 April 2021 (cancelled); 7–13 March 2021 (cancelled)
- Teams: 11

The 2021 IIHF Women's World Championship Division II was scheduled to be two international ice hockey tournaments organized by the International Ice Hockey Federation. The Division II Group A tournament would have been held in Jaca, Spain, from 10 to 16 April 2021 and the Division II Group B tournament in Zagreb, Croatia, from 7 to 13 March 2021.

In 2020, Australia was initially promoted but after Division II Group A was cancelled due to the COVID-19 pandemic, they remain in Division II Group B.

On 18 November 2020, both tournaments were cancelled due to the COVID-19 pandemic.

== Division II Group A ==
2021 IIHF Women's World Championship Division II A
Tournament details
- Host country: Spain
- Venue: 1 (in 1 host city)
- Dates: 10–16 April 2021 (cancelled)
- Teams: 6

=== Planned participating teams ===
Team	Qualification
Latvia	Placed 6th in 2019 Division I B and were relegated.
Great Britain	Placed 2nd in 2019 Division II A.
Spain	Hosts; placed 3rd in 2019 Division II A.
Mexico	Placed 4th in 2019 Division II A.
North Korea	Placed 5th in 2019 Division II A.
Chinese Taipei	Placed 1st in 2019 Division II B and were promoted.

=== Standings ===
Pos	Team	Pld	W	OTW	OTL	L	GF	GA	GD	Pts
1	Latvia	0	0	0	0	0	0	0	0	0
2	Great Britain	0	0	0	0	0	0	0	0	0
3	Spain (H)	0	0	0	0	0	0	0	0	0
4	Mexico	0	0	0	0	0	0	0	0	0
5	North Korea	0	0	0	0	0	0	0	0	0
6	Chinese Taipei	0	0	0	0	0	0	0	0	0

(H) Host

== Division II Group B ==
2021 IIHF Women's World Championship Division II B
Tournament details
- Host country: Croatia
- Venue: 1 (in 1 host city)
- Dates: 7–13 March 2021 (cancelled)
- Teams: 5

=== Planned participating teams ===
Team	Qualification
Australia	Placed 1st in Division II B last year.
Iceland	Hosts; placed 2nd in Division II B last year.
~~New Zealand~~	Placed 3rd in Division II B last year.
Turkey	Placed 4th in Division II B last year.
Croatia	Placed 5th in Division II B last year.
South Africa	Placed 1st in Division III last year and were promoted.

=== Standings ===
Pos	Team	Pld	W	OTW	OTL	L	GF	GA	GD	Pts
1	Australia	0	0	0	0	0	0	0	0	0
2	Iceland	0	0	0	0	0	0	0	0	0
3	Turkey	0	0	0	0	0	0	0	0	0
4	Croatia (H)	0	0	0	0	0	0	0	0	0
5	South Africa	0	0	0	0	0	0	0	0	0
6	~~New Zealand~~ (Note: New Zealand withdrew on 27 October 2020.)	0	0	0	0	0	0	0	0	0

(H) Host
