= Lauren Halliwell =

British ice hockey player (born 1989)

- Born: 5 March 1989 (age 37) Blackburn, England
- Height: 165 cm (5 ft 5 in)
- Weight: 65 kg (143 lb; 10 st 3 lb)
- Position: Defence
- Shot: Right
- Played for: Kingston Diamonds; Newcastle Lady Vipers; Sheffield Shadows
- National team: Great Britain
- Playing career: 2003–2018

Lauren Halliwell (born 5 March 1989) plays for Great Britain women's national ice hockey team as defenceman.
