= Helen Murray =

New Zealand ice hockey defender

- Born: 3 September 1990 (age 36) New Zealand
- Height: 163 cm (5 ft 4 in)
- Position: Forward
- Shoots: Right
- National team: New Zealand
- Playing career: 2013–present
- Scientific career
- Thesis: Plasticity in the Human Alzheimer’s Disease Brain (2017)

Helen C. Murray (born 3 September 1990) is a New Zealand neuroscientist and ice hockey forward. As captain of the New Zealand women's national ice hockey team, Murray has played a key leadership role on and off the ice. She made her debut with the senior national team at the 2013 IIHF Women's World Championship Division II, and in 2016 she was appointed team captain.

Alongside her athletic achievements, Murray has built an academic career in neuroscience, with a specialized focus on Alzheimer's disease. She divides her research time between the National Institutes of Health (NIH) in the United States and the Centre for Brain Research at the University of Auckland, where she conducts advanced studies into the mechanisms of neurodegeneration. In 2017, she completed her doctoral studies with a thesis titled Plasticity in the Human Alzheimer’s Disease Brain, which explored the brain’s capacity to adapt and reorganize in the face of neurodegenerative changes. Her work contributes to the global effort to understand better and eventually treat Alzheimer’s disease, bridging clinical research and academic insight.

Murray has advocated for women in science and sport.
