= Slovenia women's national ice hockey team =

Slovenia
- The official logo of the Ice Hockey Federation of Slovenia.
- Nickname: Risinje (The Lynx)
- Association: Ice Hockey Federation of Slovenia
- Head coach: Boštjan Kos
- Assistants: Rene Zernko; Žan Zupan
- Captain: Pia Pren
- Most games: Pia Pren (86)
- Top scorer: Pia Pren (78)
- Most points: Pia Pren (164)
- IIHF code: SLO

Ranking
- Current IIHF: 23 ▼2 (3 June 2026)
- Highest IIHF: 16 (first in 2006)
- Lowest IIHF: 26 (2003)

First international
- Great Britain 12–0 Slovenia (Maribor, Slovenia; 20 March 2001)

Biggest win
- Slovenia 19–2 South Africa (Cape Town, South Africa; 4 March 2005)

Biggest defeat
- Slovakia 23–0 Slovenia (Maribor, Slovenia; 23 March 2001)

World Championships
- Appearances: 20 (first in 2001)
- Best result: 20th (2023)

International record (W–L–T)
- 49–73–2

The Slovenian women's national ice hockey team represents Slovenia at the International Ice Hockey Federation's IIHF World Women's Championships. The women's national team is controlled by Hokejska zveza Slovenije. As of 2011, Slovenia has 88 female players. The Slovenian women's national team is ranked 19th in the world.

== Tournament record ==
=== Olympic record ===
The Slovenia women's team has never qualified for an Olympic tournament.

=== World Championship record ===
Slovenia debuted in the Women's world championship in 2001.

- 2001 – Finished 26th (5th in Division II, Demoted to Division III)
- 2003 – Finished 22nd (2nd in Division III)
- 2004 – Finished 23rd place (2nd in Division III)
- 2005 – Finished 21st place (1st in Division III, Promoted to Division II)
- 2007 – Finished 21st place (6th in Division II, Demoted to Division III)
- 2008 – Finished 23rd place (2nd in Division III)
- 2011 – Finished 23rd place (4th in Division III)
- 2012 – Finished 25th place (5th in Division IIA)
- 2013 – Finished 26th place (6th in Division IIA, Demoted to Division IIB)
- 2014 – Finished 28th place (2nd in Division IIB)
- 2015 – Finished 27th place (1st in Division IIB, Promoted to Division IIA)
- 2016 – Finished 25th place (5th in Division IIA)
- 2017 – Finished 25th place (5th in Division IIA)
- 2018 – Finished 26th place (5th in Division IIA)
- 2019 – Finished 23rd place (1st in Division IIA, Promoted to Division IB)
- 2020 – Cancelled due to the COVID-19 pandemic
- 2021 – Cancelled due to the COVID-19 pandemic
- 2022 – Finished 22nd place (6th in Division IB)
- 2023 – Finished 20th place (4th in Division IB)
- 2024 – Finished 21st place (4th in Division IB)
- 2025 – Finished 22nd place (6th in Division IB)
- 2026 – Finished 24th place (2nd in Division IIA)

=== IIHF Women's European Cup of Nations ===
- 2026–27 – (Group C)

== Team ==
=== Current roster ===
The roster for the 2022 IIHF Women's World Championship Division I Group B tournament.

Head coach: Franc Ferjanič

No.	Pos.	Name	Height	Weight	Birthdate	Team
2	D	Maja Bizjak	1.61 m (5 ft 3 in)	55 kg (121 lb)	29 June 2000 (aged 21)	(Slovenia) HK Olimpija
5	F	Arwen Nylaander	1.65 m (5 ft 5 in)	58 kg (128 lb)	18 October 2005 (aged 16)	(Slovenia) HDK Maribor
6	F	Eva Dukarič – A	1.63 m (5 ft 4 in)	64 kg (141 lb)	9 May 1997 (aged 24)	(Slovenia) HK Olimpija
7	D	Deja Glavič	1.63 m (5 ft 4 in)	54 kg (119 lb)	17 September 2003 (aged 18)	(Slovenia) HK Triglav Kranj
8	F	Sara Confidenti	1.62 m (5 ft 4 in)	68 kg (150 lb)	26 February 1998 (aged 24)	(Hungary) KMH Budapest
9	D	Nina Lončar	1.64 m (5 ft 5 in)	72 kg (159 lb)	26 March 1989 (aged 33)	(Slovenia) HK Olimpija
10	D	Katja Biščak	1.65 m (5 ft 5 in)	60 kg (130 lb)	27 January 1986 (aged 36)	(Slovenia) HK Olimpija
11	F	Tineja Friš Lorber	1.66 m (5 ft 5 in)	65 kg (143 lb)	6 February 2006 (aged 16)	(Austria) Devils Graz
14	D	Nuša Porekar	1.63 m (5 ft 4 in)	52 kg (115 lb)	28 November 1991 (aged 30)	(Austria) Devils Graz
15	F	Pia Pren – C	1.64 m (5 ft 5 in)	62 kg (137 lb)	19 June 1991 (aged 30)	(Sweden) Södertälje SK
16	F	Tamara Breznik	1.59 m (5 ft 3 in)	51 kg (112 lb)	9 February 2001 (aged 21)	(Slovenia) HK Olimpija
17	F	Julija Blazinšek	1.67 m (5 ft 6 in)	63 kg (139 lb)	4 July 2003 (aged 18)	(Sweden) Södertälje SK
18	D	Tamara Svetina	1.67 m (5 ft 6 in)	75 kg (165 lb)	20 June 1995 (aged 26)	(Slovenia) HK Triglav Kranj
19	F	Gaja Pezdir	1.63 m (5 ft 4 in)	55 kg (121 lb)	24 July 2003 (aged 18)	(Sweden) Södertälje SK
20	G	Pia Dukarič	1.73 m (5 ft 8 in)	68 kg (150 lb)	4 August 2000 (aged 21)	(United States) Yale Bulldogs
23	F	Ana Pršina	1.75 m (5 ft 9 in)	85 kg (187 lb)	30 March 1996 (aged 26)	(Austria) Devils Graz
24	F	Urša Pazlar – A	1.53 m (5 ft 0 in)	51 kg (112 lb)	19 October 1994 (aged 27)	(Slovenia) HK Olimpija
25	G	Nuša Dovžan	1.69 m (5 ft 7 in)	68 kg (150 lb)	25 May 2000 (aged 21)	(Slovenia) HK Triglav Kranj
