= Georgina Farman =

English ice hockey player

- Born: 12 February 1991 (age 34); Kingston, Greater London, United Kingdom
- Height: 166 cm (5 ft 5 in)
- Weight: 65 kg (143 lb; 10 st 3 lb)
- Position: Defence
- Shoots: Right
- SDHL team Former teams: Göteborg HC; Linköping HC; IF Norrköping; Sheffield Shadows; Kingston Diamonds
- National team: Great Britain
- Playing career: 2000–present

Georgina Farman (born 12 February 1991) is an English ice hockey defender, currently playing with Göteborg HC of the Swedish Women's Hockey League (SDHL) and internationally with Team GB. She is the first British player to play in the SDHL.

== Career ==
Having grown up in Hull, Farman began playing for the Sheffield Shadows in the top flight of British women's hockey by the age of 14. In 2013, she left the UK to move to Sweden, to play for IF Norrköping in Damettan. After scoring 37 points in 17 games with the club, she was signed by Linköping HC ahead of the 2014-15 Riksserien season.
