= 2011 IIHF Women's World Championship Division IV =

Tournament details
- Host country: Iceland
- City: Reykjavík
- Venue: 1 (in 1 host city)
- Dates: 29 March – 4 April 2011
- Teams: 5

The 2011 IIHF Women's World Championship Division IV was an international ice hockey tournament organized by the International Ice Hockey Federation. It was played in Reykjavík, Iceland, from 29 March to 4 April 2011. Division IV represented the fifth tier of the IIHF Women's World Championship.

The winner of this tournament, New Zealand, was promoted to Division III (renamed II A) for the 2012 championships. Initially, the tournament was to include Estonia, however the IIHF provide no reason for their absence and did not replace them. Despite having only five teams, the last-placed team in the group, South Africa, was temporarily relegated to Division V (renamed Division II B Qualification). The number of next year's entrants shrank so South Africa was able to remain at this level.

== Participating teams ==
Team	Qualification
South Korea	placed 6th in 2008 Division III and were relegated
Iceland	hosts; placed 1st in 2008 Division IV
New Zealand	placed 2nd in 2008 Division IV
Romania	placed 3rd in 2008 Division IV
~~Estonia~~	placed 4th in 2008 Division IV; withdrew from 2011 tournament
South Africa	placed 5th in 2008 Division IV

== Final standings ==
Pos	Team	Pld	W	OTW	OTL	L	GF	GA	GD	Pts	Promotion, qualification or relegation
1	New Zealand	4	4	0	0	0	20	6	+14	12	Promoted to the 2012 Division II A
2	South Korea	4	3	0	0	1	15	6	+9	9	Qualified for the 2012 Division II B
3	Iceland (H)	4	2	0	0	2	10	10	0	6	Qualified for the 2012 Division II B
4	Romania	4	1	0	0	3	9	15	−6	3	Did not participate in 2012
5	South Africa	4	0	0	0	4	4	21	−17	0	Qualified for the 2012 Division II B
–	~~Estonia~~	0	0	0	0	0	0	0	0	0	Withdrawn; did not participate in 2012

Source: IIHF
(H) Host

== Match results ==
All times are local (Greenwich Mean Time – UTC±0).

27 March 2011; 16:30	South Africa	0–6 (0–3, 0–0, 0–3)	South Korea	Laugardalur Arena

Game reference

27 March 2011; 20:00	New Zealand	3–1 (1–1, 1–0, 1–0)	Iceland	Laugardalur Arena

Game reference

28 March 2011; 16:30	Romania	3–1 (2–0, 1–0, 0–1)	South Africa	Laugardalur Arena

Game reference

29 March 2011; 16:30	South Korea	1–3 (1–2, 0–0, 0–1)	New Zealand	Laugardalur Arena

Game reference

29 March 2011; 20:00	Iceland	3–2 (2–0, 1–0, 0–2)	Romania	Laugardalur Arena

Game reference

30 March 2011; 20:00	South Africa	1–5 (1–0, 0–2, 0–3)	Iceland	Laugardalur Arena

Game reference

31 March 2011; 16:30	New Zealand	7–2 (2–1, 2–0, 3–1)	South Africa	Laugardalur Arena

Game reference

31 March 2011; 20:00	South Korea	4–2 (0–1, 2–1, 2–0)	Romania	Laugardalur Arena

Game reference

1 April 2011; 16:30	Romania	2–7 (0–3, 1–2, 1–2)	New Zealand	Laugardalur Arena

Game reference

1 April 2011; 20:00	Iceland	1–4 (0–1, 1–1, 0–2)	South Korea	Laugardalur Arena

Game reference

== Statistics ==
=== Scoring leaders ===
Pos	Player	Country	GP	G	A	Pts	+/−	PIM
1	Emma Gray	New Zealand	4	6	5	11	+8	4
2	Hwangbo Young	South Korea	4	8	2	10	+7	2
3	Magdolna Popescu	Romania	4	6	0	6	+2	4
4	Sheree Haslemore	New Zealand	4	3	3	6	+5	0
4	Hanna Heimisdottir	Iceland	4	3	3	6	+2	2
6	Casey Redman	New Zealand	4	3	2	5	+5	2
7	Han Jae-yeon	South Korea	4	2	3	5	+3	6
7	Han Soo-jin	South Korea	4	2	3	5	+7	2
9	Ashley Cunningham	New Zealand	4	3	1	4	+5	14
9	Flosrun Johannesdottir	Iceland	4	3	1	4	+1	4

GP = Games played; G = Goals; A = Assists; Pts = Points; +/− = Plus-minus; PIM = Penalties In Minutes
Source: IIHF.com

=== Goaltending leaders ===
(minimum 40% team's total ice time)

Pos	Player	Country	TOI	GA	GAA	Sv%	SO
1	Lyndal Heineman	New Zealand	120:00	2	1.00	95.24	0
2	Shin So-jung	South Korea	218:10	6	1.65	94.34	0
3	Karítas Halldórsdóttir	Iceland	239:48	9	2.25	92.11	0
4	Beáta Antal	Romania	234:52	15	3.83	89.66	0
5	Shaylene Swanepoel	South Africa	237:32	21	5.30	87.72	0

TOI = Time On Ice (minutes:seconds); GA = Goals against; GAA = Goals against average; Sv% = Save percentage; SO = Shutouts
Source: IIHF.com

=== Directorate Awards ===
- Goaltender: Shin So-jung, South Korea
- Defenseman: Anna Agustsdottir, Iceland
- Forward: Emma Gray, New Zealand

Source: IIHF.com
