= Bethany Hill =

British ice hockey player (born 1996)

- Born: 27 July 1996 (age 29) Crawley, West Sussex, England
- Height: 1.60 m (5 ft 3 in)
- Weight: 58 kg (128 lb; 9 st 2 lb)
- Shoots: Left
- WNIHL Elite team: Guildford Lightning

Bethany Hill (born 27 July 1996) is a British ice hockey player. She plays for Guildford Lightning and the Great Britain women's national ice hockey team. In 2025, she was named as assistant captain for the women's national team.

== Career ==
Hill plays for Guildford Lightning in the Women's National Ice Hockey Elite League and for the Great Britain women's national ice hockey team. In 2025, Hill was named as assistant captain for the women's national team alongside captain Jodie Alderson-Smith.
