= Nicole Jackson (ice hockey) =

English ice hockey goaltender

- Born: 31 August 1992 (age 34) Oldham, England
- Height: 170 cm (5 ft 7 in)
- Weight: 67 kg (148 lb; 10 st 8 lb)
- Position: Goaltender
- Catches: Left
- SDHL team Former teams: Göteborg HC; Linköping HC; Sheffield Steeldogs; Kingston Diamonds; Slough Phantoms
- National team: Great Britain
- Playing career: 2008–present

Nicole Jackson (born 31 August 1992) is an English ice hockey goaltender and member of the British national ice hockey team (Team GB), currently playing with Göteborg HC in the Swedish Women's Hockey League (SDHL).

== Career ==
In 2015, she signed with the Sheffield Steeldogs of the men's English Premier Ice Hockey League on a two-way contract allowing her to appear on loan with the Bradford Bulldogs in the men's second-tier league, the National Ice Hockey League (NIHL), when she wasn't starting games for the Steeldogs.

In 2017, she moved to Sweden to take the starting position with Göteborg HC, and in 2018, she saved 72 out of 75 shots in a loss to Linköping HC and would almost repeat that performance in 2019 by making 64 saves in a loss to Luleå HF/MSSK.
