= Kim Hyang-mi (ice hockey) =

North Korean ice hockey player (born 1995)

- Born: February 10, 1995 (age 30) North Korea
- Height: 162 cm (5 ft 4 in)
- Weight: 72 kg (159 lb; 11 st 5 lb)
- Position: Forward
- Shoots: Right
- National team: North Korea and Korea
- Playing career: 2014–present

Kim Hyang-mi (born 10 February 1995) is a North Korean ice hockey player. She competed in the 2018 Winter Olympics.
