= New Zealand women's national ice hockey team =

New Zealand
- Nickname: Ice Fernz
- Association: New Zealand Ice Hockey Federation
- General manager: Rebecca Dobson
- Head coach: Mike Sam
- Assistants: Brooke Patron
- Captain: Anjali Mulari
- Most games: Anjali Mulari (60)
- Top scorer: Anjali Mulari (35)
- Most points: Anjali Mulari (85)
- Team colors
- IIHF code: NZL

Ranking
- Current IIHF: 30 (▲2) (3 June 2026)
- Highest IIHF: 25 (first in 2012)
- Lowest IIHF: 35 (2022)

First international
- Australia 2–1 New Zealand (Canterbury, New Zealand; 5 November 2000)

Biggest win
- New Zealand 19–0 Turkey (Miercurea-Ciuc, Romania; 29 March 2007)

Biggest defeat
- Australia 15–0 New Zealand (Christchurch, New Zealand; 13 December 2001)

World Championships
- Appearances: 17 (first in 2005)
- Best result: 24th (2012, 2013)

International record (W–L–T)
- 39–52–1

The New Zealand women's national ice hockey team, nicknamed the Ice Fernz, represents New Zealand at the International Ice Hockey Federation's IIHF World Women's Championships. The women's national team is controlled by New Zealand Ice Hockey Federation. As of 2011, New Zealand has 110 female players. The New Zealand women's national team is ranked 25th in the world. The Ice Fernz name is one of many national team nicknames (indirectly) related to the All Blacks and/or the New Zealand silver tree fern.

== Tournament record ==
=== Olympic Games ===
New Zealand hockey team has never qualified for an Olympic tournament.

=== World Championship ===
The New Zealand women team participates in the world championship since 2005. At its first three participations of world championship, the New Zealanders finished every time the second or the third place of the division IV.

- 2005 – Finished in 29th place (2nd in Division IV)
- 2007 – Finished in 29th place (3rd in Division IV)
- 2008 – Finished in 28th place (2nd in Division IV)
- 2009 – Division IV cancelled
- 2011 – Finished in 26th place (1st in Division IV, Promoted to Division III).
- 2012 – Finished in 24th place (4th in Division IIA)
- 2013 – Finished in 24th place (4th in Division IIA)
- 2014 – Finished in 25th place (5th in Division IIA)
- 2015 – Finished in 26th place (6th in Division IIA, relegated to Division IIB)
- 2016 – Finished in 31st place (5th in Division IIB)
- 2017 – Finished in 28th place (3rd in Division IIB)
- 2018 – Finished in 31st place (4th in Division IIB)
- 2019 – Finished in 30th place (2nd in Division IIB)
- 2020 – Finished in 31st place (3rd in Division IIB)
- 2021 – Cancelled due to the COVID-19 pandemic
- 2022 – Withdrawn
- 2023 – Finished in 30th place (3rd in Division IIB)
- 2024 – Finished in 32nd place (4th in Division IIB)
- 2025 – Finished in 30th place (2nd in Division IIB)
- 2026 – Finished in 32nd place (4th in Division IIB)

== All-time record against other nations ==
As of 3 April 2019

Opponent	Played	Won	Drawn	Lost	Win %	For	Aga	Diff
Australia	11	1	0	10	9.09%	12	84	−72
Chinese Taipei	2	0	0	2	0.00%	2	8	−6
Croatia	3	1	0	2	33.33%	9	9	0
Estonia	2	2	0	0	100.00%	13	1	+12
Great Britain	2	0	0	2	0.00%	1	10	−9
Hungary	2	0	0	2	0.00%	3	11	−8
Iceland	8	3	1	4	37.50%	19	36	−17
Italy	2	0	0	2	0.00%	2	11	−9
Kazakhstan	1	0	0	1	0.00%	0	10	−10
Mexico	2	0	0	2	0.00%	2	6	−4
North Korea	1	0	0	1	0.00%	1	7	−6
Poland	3	1	0	2	0.00%	7	8	−1
Romania	6	5	0	1	83.33%	36	15	+21
Slovenia	2	2	0	0	100.00%	9	6	+3
South Africa	2	2	0	0	100.00%	16	3	+13
South Korea	4	1	0	3	25.00%	6	11	−5
Spain	4	0	0	4	0.00%	5	22	−17
Turkey	5	5	0	0	100.00%	58	11	+47
Total	62	23	1	38	37.10%	201	269	-68

== All-time record against other clubs ==
As of 3 April 2019

Opponent	Played	Won	Drawn	Lost	Win %	For	Aga	Diff
(Australia) New South Wales	1	0	0	1	0.00%	1	2	−1
Canada Moose	3	2	1	0	66.67%	18	7	+11
(Sweden) Norrtälje	2	0	0	1	0.00%	0	28	−28
(Canada) Leaside Wildcats Bantam B	1	0	0	1	0.00%	3	6	−3
(New Zealand) Leaside Wildcats Midget AA	1	0	0	1	0.00%	0	1	−1
(Canada) Durham West Lightning Senior A	2	0	0	2	0.00%	4	6	−2
(Canada) Brampton Canadettes Senior A	2	0	0	2	0.00%	1	10	−9
(Austria) EHV Sabers	2	0	0	2	0.00%	14	4	−10
Total	14	2	1	11	14.29%	31	74	-43
