= Great Britain women's national ice hockey team =

Great Britain
- Nickname: Team GB
- Association: Ice Hockey UK
- General manager: Claire Rowbotham
- Head coach: Beth Hanrahan
- Assistants: David Clancy; Reggie Wilcox
- Captain: Louise Adams
- Most games: Katie Henry (69)
- Top scorer: Angela Taylor (39)
- Most points: Angela Taylor (70)
- Team colors
- IIHF code: GBR

Ranking
- Current IIHF: 19 (3 June 2026)
- Highest IIHF: 17 (2012)
- Lowest IIHF: 24 (2021)

First international
- Netherlands 4–2 Great Britain (Chelmsford, Great Britain; 6 March 1989)

Biggest win
- Great Britain 27–0 South Africa (Sheffield, Great Britain; 9 March 2007)

Biggest defeat
- Sweden 16–0 Great Britain (Frýdek-Místek, Czechoslovakia; 18 March 1991)

World Championships
- Appearances: 23 (first in 2003)
- Best result: 18th (2009, 2012)

European Championships
- Appearances: 4 (first in 1991)
- Best result: 9th (1991)

International record (W–L–T)
- 84–90–3

The British women's national ice hockey team represents the United Kingdom in international ice hockey competition, including the International Ice Hockey Federation's IIHF Women's World Championships. The women's national team is controlled by Ice Hockey UK. As of 2011, Great Britain has 476 female players.

== Tournament record ==
=== Olympic Games ===
Great Britain team has never qualified for an Olympic tournament.

=== World Championship ===
Year	Finish
1999	Not ranked (2nd in Group B qualification Pool A)
2000	Finished in 19th place (3rd in Group B qualification)
2001	Finished in 20th place (2nd in Division I qualification Pool B)
2003	Finished in 20th place (6th in Division II)
2004	Finished in 21st place (6th in Division II, Demoted to Division III)
2005	Finished in 22nd place (2nd in Division III)
2007	Finished in 23rd place (2nd in Division III)
2008	Finished in 22nd place (1st in Division III and promoted to Division II)
2009	Finished in 18th place (3rd in Division II)
2011	Finished in 19th place (5th in Division II)
2012	Finished in 18th place (4th in Division IB)
2013	Finished in 20th place (6th in Division IB and demoted to Division IIA)
2014	Finished in 22nd place (2nd in Division IIA)
2015	Finished in 22nd place (2nd in Division IIA)
2016	Finished in 23rd place (3rd in Division IIA)
2017	Finished in 23rd place (3rd in Division IIA)
2018	Finished in 23rd place (2nd in Division IIA)
2019	Finished in 24th place (2nd in Division IIA)
2020	Cancelled due to the COVID-19 pandemic
2021	Cancelled due to the COVID-19 pandemic
2022	Finished in 22nd place (1st in Division IIA)
2023	Finished in 21st place (5th in Division IB)
2024	Finished in 20th place (4th in Division IB)
2025	Finished in 19th place (3rd in Division IB)
2026	Finished in 18th place (2nd in Division IB)

=== European Championship ===
Year	Finish
1989	Finished in 10th place
1991	Finished in 9th place
1993	Finished in 10th place (4th in Group B)
1995	Finished in 13th place (7th in Group B)
1996	Finished in 14th place (8th in Group B)

== Team ==
Roster for the Group B tournament of the 2025 IIHF Women's World Championship Division I.

Head coach: Sean Alderson
Assistant coaches: Beth Hanrahan, David Clancy (goaltender)

No.	Pos.	Name	Height	Weight	Birthdate	Team
1	G	Nicole Jackson	1.68 m (5 ft 6 in)	68 kg (150 lb)	31 August 1992 (age 33)	(Sweden) Södertälje SK
2	D	Abbie Sylvester	1.70 m (5 ft 7 in)	82 kg (181 lb)	19 May 2000 (age 26)	(United Kingdom) Bracknell Queen Bees
3	D	Ellin Rees	1.76 m (5 ft 9 in)	72 kg (159 lb)	25 February 2006 (age 20)	(United States) Newark Ironbound
4	D	Casey Traill	1.76 m (5 ft 9 in)	70 kg (150 lb)	11 May 1999 (age 27)	(United Kingdom) Whitley Bay Beacons
6	F	Laura Horwood	1.65 m (5 ft 5 in)	71 kg (157 lb)	1 April 1999 (age 27)	(United Kingdom) Solihull Vixens
7	F	Ruby Newlands	1.67 m (5 ft 6 in)	56 kg (123 lb)	20 February 2007 (age 19)	(United Kingdom) Kilmarnock Blizzard
8	F	Jodie Alderson-Smith – C	1.60 m (5 ft 3 in)	68 kg (150 lb)	27 August 1994 (age 31)	(United Kingdom) Solihull Vixens
9	F	Lilly Endicott	1.61 m (5 ft 3 in)	53 kg (117 lb)	20 October 2007 (age 18)	(United Kingdom) Bracknell Queen Bees
10	D	Lucy Beal	1.60 m (5 ft 3 in)	62 kg (137 lb)	19 December 2002 (age 23)	(United States) King's College Monarchs
12	F	Louise Adams	1.65 m (5 ft 5 in)	70 kg (150 lb)	24 November 1995 (age 30)	(United Kingdom) Bracknell Queen Bees
13	F	Aimee Headland	1.70 m (5 ft 7 in)	57 kg (126 lb)	10 November 2001 (age 24)	(United Kingdom) Romford Raiders
14	F	Kathryn Marsden	1.65 m (5 ft 5 in)	71 kg (157 lb)	6 February 1999 (age 27)	(United Kingdom) Kingston Diamonds
15	F	Ellie Wallace	1.86 m (6 ft 1 in)	68 kg (150 lb)	17 January 2004 (age 22)	(United Kingdom) Bracknell Queen Bees
16	F	Emma Lamberton	1.66 m (5 ft 5 in)	70 kg (150 lb)	25 October 2007 (age 18)	(United Kingdom) North Ayrshire Wild
17	D	Bethany Hill – A	1.60 m (5 ft 3 in)	58 kg (128 lb)	27 July 1996 (age 30)	(United Kingdom) Guildford Lightning
18	D	Chloe Needham-Potts	1.73 m (5 ft 8 in)	72 kg (159 lb)	10 October 2005 (age 20)	(United States) East Coast Valkyries
19	F	Robin Mullen	1.72 m (5 ft 8 in)	65 kg (143 lb)	26 April 1989 (age 37)	(United Kingdom) Solihull Vixens
21	D	Ellie Wakeling	1.65 m (5 ft 5 in)	70 kg (150 lb)	21 July 2002 (age 24)	(United Kingdom) Romford Raiders
22	F	Rachel Cartwright	1.65 m (5 ft 5 in)	65 kg (143 lb)	22 June 1993 (age 33)	(United Kingdom) Bracknell Queen Bees
23	F	Chamonix Jackson	1.57 m (5 ft 2 in)	55 kg (121 lb)	2 March 2004 (age 22)	(United States) SUNY Canton Roos
24	F	Abigail Culshaw	1.56 m (5 ft 1 in)	60 kg (130 lb)	5 March 1998 (age 28)	(United Kingdom) Whitley Bay Beacons
25	G	Ella Howard	1.79 m (5 ft 10 in)	72 kg (159 lb)	21 February 2003 (age 23)	(Canada) NAIT Ooks
