= Ice hockey at the 2026 Winter Olympics – Women's qualification =

Qualification for the women's ice hockey tournament at the 2026 Winter Olympics was determined by the IIHF World Ranking following the 2024 Women's Ice Hockey World Championships. The host along with the top six teams in the world ranking received automatic berths into the Olympics, while all other teams had an opportunity to qualify for the remaining three spots.

== Qualified teams ==
Event	Date	Location	Vacancies	Qualified
Hosts	—N/a		1	Italy
2024 IIHF World Ranking	14 April 2024	—N/a	5	Canada; United States; Finland; Czech Republic; Switzerland
Final qualification tournaments	6 – 9 February 2025	(Japan) Tomakomai	2	Japan; France
Final qualification tournaments	6 – 9 February 2025	(Sweden) Gävle	1	Sweden
Final qualification tournaments	6 – 9 February 2025	(Germany) Bremerhaven	1	Germany
Total			10	

Notes

1. ^{a} The 2024 IIHF World Ranking comprised the following events: 2021 World Championship, 2022 World Championship, 2022 Winter Olympic Games, 2023 World Championship and 2024 World Championship.
2. ^{b} Utica was the site of the 2024 IIHF Women's World Championship; at the conclusion of the tournament the direct qualification slots were finalized; however, final qualification ranking was not determined until the completion of the Division IA tournament in Klagenfurt on 27 April.
3. ^{c} France replaced banned Russia both in the men's and women's tournament, filling the final seed in both.

== Qualification seeding ==
To qualify directly, a nation had to be ranked in the top six following the 2024 Women's Ice Hockey World Championships. In the IIHF World Ranking system, ranking points from the most recent year are weighted at full value, and points from each preceding year are worth 25% less. The table below represents the standings of the 45 current participants, and Russia (whose status is yet to be determined).

Qualified directly to Olympic tournament
Entered in Final Olympic qualification
Entered in Round 2
Entered in Round 1 (cancelled)
Did not enter Olympic qualification

Qualifying seed	Team	WC2024 (100%)	WC2023 (75%)	WC2022 (50%)	OLY2022 (50%)	WC2021 (25%)	Total
1	Canada	1600	1560	1200	1200	1200	4270
2	United States	1560	1600	1160	1160	1160	4210
3	Finland	1520	1460	1040	1120	1120	3975
4	Czechia	1500	1520	1120	1020	1020	3965
5	Switzerland	1460	1500	1100	1100	1100	3960
6	Russia	1440	1460	1100	1060	1060	3880
7	Japan	1400	1420	1060	1040	1040	3775
8	Sweden	1420	1440	1020	1000	960	3750
9	Germany	1440	1400	960	860	1000	3650
10	Hungary	1300	1360	1000	920	960	3520
11	Denmark	1340	1300	940	940	940	3490
12	China	1360	1320	820	960	740	3425
13	France	1280	1340	920	880	920	3415
14	Norway	1320	1240	900	840	880	3340
15	Austria	1260	1280	860	900	860	3315
16	Slovakia	1200	1220	880	820	840	3175
17	Netherlands	1240	1260	840	740	780	3170
18	South Korea	1220	1200	740	780	800	3080
Host	Italy	1160	1160	780	800	820	3025
19	Poland	1100	1180	800	760	760	2955
20	Great Britain	1140	1120	700	720	660	2855
21	Slovenia	1120	1140	720	680	680	2845
22	Kazakhstan	1080	1100	760	660	720	2795
23	Spain	1060	1060	660	700	640	2695
24	Mexico	1040	1040	620	640	620	2605
25	Chinese Taipei	1020	1020	640	620	540	2550
26	Latvia	1180	1080	680	0	700	2505
27	Iceland	1000	1000	580	600	520	2470
28	Turkey	880	860	540	580	580	2230
	Hong Kong	920	840	360	560	460	2125
	Australia	940	940	560	0	560	2065
	Belgium	980	960	460	0	400	2030
	New Zealand	900	920	540	0	500	1985
29	Lithuania	800	800	440	520	340	1965
	South Africa	860	900	520	0	420	1900
30	Bulgaria	740	760	420	540	360	1880
31	Croatia	760	880	500	0	480	1790
	Ukraine	840	820	460	0	380	1780
32	Romania	820	780	420	0	440	1725
33	Estonia	700	740	340	0	320	1505
34	Serbia	780	720	320	0	0	1480
	North Korea	960	0	620	0	600	1420
	Bosnia and Herzegovina	640	680	300	0	300	1375
	Israel	680	700	280	0	0	1345
35	Thailand	720	0	0	0	0	720
	Singapore	660	0	0	0	0	660

== Olympic qualification Round 1 ==
This round was canceled. It was meant to take place between 7–10 November 2024, and consist of three groups of teams ranked 25th or lower. Teams entered in Group A were Chinese Taipei, Bulgaria and Croatia; teams in Group B were Latvia, Lithuania, Romania and Thailand; and teams in Group C were Iceland, Turkey, Estonia and Serbia.

The three highest ranked teams, Chinese Taipei, Latvia and Iceland, advanced to Round 2.

== Olympic qualification Round 2 ==
Twelve countries played in three tournaments from 12 to 15 December 2024, involving nations ranked 16th to 24th and those who advanced from Round 1 (named Qualifier 4, 5, and 6). If nations declined to participate then those ranked lower moved up to fill their place.

=== Group D ===
Group D

Tournament details
- Host country: Slovakia
- City: Piešťany
- Venue: 1 (in 1 host city)
- Dates: 12–15 December
- Teams: 4

Tournament statistics
- Games played: 6
- Goals scored: 49 (8.17 per game)
- Attendance: 1,321 (220 per game)
- Scoring leader: (Slovakia) Nela Lopušanová (18 points)

Official website
- IIHF

The tournament was held in Piešťany, Slovakia.

Pos	Team	Pld	W	OTW	OTL	L	GF	GA	GD	Pts	Qualification
1	Slovakia (H)	3	3	0	0	0	37	2	+35	9	Final qualification
2	Kazakhstan	3	2	0	0	1	6	8	−2	6	
3	Slovenia	3	1	0	0	2	3	19	−16	3	
4	Iceland	3	0	0	0	3	3	20	−17	0	

Source: IIHF
Rules for classification: 1) points; 2) head-to-head points; 3) head-to-head goal difference; 4) head-to-head number of goals scored; 5) result against closest best-ranked team outside tied teams; 6) result against second-best ranked team outside tied teams; 7) seeding before tournament.
(H) Host

All times are local (UTC+1).

12 December 2024; 14:00	Slovenia	3–2 (1–1, 1–1, 1–0)	Iceland	Patrícia Ice Arena 37, Piešťany; Attendance: 27

Game reference

Pia Dukarič
Goalies
Andrea Bachmann
Referee:
(Czech Republic) Gabriela Malá
Linesmen:
(United Kingdom) Amy Campbell
(Slovakia) Magdaléna Jonáková

	0–1	13:20 – Snorradóttir (PP)
Blazinšek (Pezdir) – 16:01	1–1
Glavič (Kokolj, Golob) – 32:52	2–1
	2–2	36:27 – Si. Björgvinsdóttir (Snorradóttir, Ka. Björnsdóttir)
Blazinšek (Buljeta) – 49:31	3–2

8 min
Penalties
4 min
17
Shots
40

12 December 2024; 18:00	Slovakia	8–1 (3–0, 1–0, 4–1)	Kazakhstan	Patrícia Ice Arena 37, Piešťany; Attendance: 233

Game reference

Andrea Rišianová
Goalies
Arina Chshyokolova
Referee:
(Germany) Svenja Stohmenger
Linesmen:
(Netherlands) Jennifer Bannink
(Finland) Aino Ranki

Lopušanová (Ištocyová) (PP) – 07:04	1–0
Lopušanová – 14:10	2–0
Lopušanová (Kapičáková, Beňáková) – 16:23	3–0
Lopušanová – 22:07	4–0
Halušková (Bednárik) – 43:34	5–0
	5–1	45:08 – Moldabay (Shegay, Orazbayeva) (PP)
Kúbeková (Tóthová) – 47:17	6–1
Leskovjanská (Lopušanová) (PP) – 51:10	7–1
Kúbeková (Nemčeková, Ištocyová) – 59:22	8–1

4 min
Penalties
4 min
47
Shots
13

13 December 2024; 14:00	Slovenia	0–3 (0–0, 0–2, 0–1)	Kazakhstan	Patrícia Ice Arena 37, Piešťany; Attendance: 34

Game reference

Pia Dukarič
Goalies
Arina Chshyokolova
Referee:
(Sweden) Hanna Öberg
Linesmen:
(Slovakia) Magdaléna Jonáková
(United States) Amanda Ziola

0–1	29:32 – M. Sayakhatkyzy (Orazbayeva)
0–2	32:55 – Ashimova (Sviridova)
0–3	59:35 – Tursynova (Moldabay, M. Sayakhatkyzy) (EN)

8 min
Penalties
2 min
21
Shots
59

13 December 2024; 18:00	Iceland	1–15 (0–3, 1–8, 0–4)	Slovakia	Patrícia Ice Arena 37, Piešťany; Attendance: 361

Game reference

Karítas Halldórsdóttir
Andrea Bachmann
Goalies
Andrea Rišianová
Referee:
(Czech Republic) Gabriela Malá
Linesmen:
(United Kingdom) Amy Campbell
(Finland) Aino Ranki

	0–1	01:01 – Šuliková (Ištocyová)
	0–2	12:47 – Ištocyová (Lopušanová, Kúbeková) (EA)
	0–3	14:03 – Košecká (Tóthová, Fančovičová)
	0–4	20:27 – Leskovjanská (Lopušanová, Šuliková) (PP)
	0–5	22:58 – Košecká (Halušková, Fančovičová) (PP)
	0–6	24:14 – Lopušanová (Drábeková)
	0–7	26:01 – Ištocyová (Šuliková, Lopušanová) (PP)
Si. Björgvinsdóttir (Su. Björgvinsdóttir) – 26:11	1–7
	1–8	29:28 – Kapičáková (Lopušanová, Drábeková)
	1–9	32:41 – Kapičáková (Drábeková)
	1–10	36:56 – Halušková (Tóthová, Bednárik)
	1–11	38:14 – Lopušanová (Kúbeková, Drábeková)
	1–12	50:10 – Tóthová (Košecká, Bednárik)
	1–13	50:52 – Nemčeková (Ištocyová)
	1–14	55:45 – Lopušanová (Kapičáková)
	1–15	56:26 – Kúbeková

12 min
Penalties
2 min
9
Shots
69

15 December 2024; 14:00	Kazakhstan	2–0 (1–0, 0–0, 0–0)	Iceland	Patrícia Ice Arena 37, Piešťany; Attendance: 41

Game reference
Arina Chshyokolova	Goalies	Andrea Bachmann	Referee: (Germany) Svenja Stohmenger; Linesmen: (Finland) Aino Ranki (United States) Amanda Ziola
Filimonova (D. Sayakhatkyzy, Pyatkova) – 06:55 / 1–0; Ashimova (M. Sayakhatkyzy, Pyatkova) (EN) – 59:34 / 2–0			Referee: (Germany) Svenja Stohmenger; Linesmen: (Finland) Aino Ranki (United States) Amanda Ziola
6 min	Penalties	2 min	Referee: (Germany) Svenja Stohmenger; Linesmen: (Finland) Aino Ranki (United States) Amanda Ziola
25	Shots	19	Referee: (Germany) Svenja Stohmenger; Linesmen: (Finland) Aino Ranki (United States) Amanda Ziola

15 December 2024; 18:00	Slovakia	14–0 (5–0, 6–0, 3–0)	Slovenia	Patrícia Ice Arena 37, Piešťany; Attendance: 625

Game reference

Andrea Rišianová
Goalies
Pia Dukarič
Tjaša Intihar
Referee:
(Sweden) Hanna Öberg
Linesmen:
(Netherlands) Jennifer Bannink
(United Kingdom) Amy Campbell

Bednárik (Košecká, Tóthová) – 02:54	1–0
Šuliková (Lopušanová, Kúbeková) (PP) – 05:52	2–0
Tóthová (Bednárik, Košecká) – 06:40	3–0
Beňáková (Lopušanová) – 08:13	4–0
Beňáková (Paulínyová, Drábeková) – 12:31	5–0
Mateičková – 21:35	6–0
Lopušanová (Šuliková, Kúbeková) (PP) – 25:47	7–0
Janeková (Halušková, Šuliková) – 29:00	8–0
Lopušanová – 31:29	9–0
Lopušanová (Leskovjanská, Šuliková) (PP) – 33:47	10–0
Halušková – 38:52	11–0
Lopušanová (Fančovičová) – 51:36	12–0
Beňáková (Janeková, Leskovjanská) – 52:49	13–0
Jancsóová (Mateičková, Tóthová) – 54:57	14–0

0 min
Penalties
8 min
72
Shots
5

=== Group E ===
Group E

Tournament details
- Host country: Great Britain
- City: Sheffield
- Venue: 1 (in 1 host city)
- Dates: 12–15 December
- Teams: 4

Tournament statistics
- Games played: 6
- Goals scored: 17 (2.83 per game)
- Attendance: 2,993 (499 per game)
- Scoring leader: (United Kingdom) Katie Henry (4 points)

Official website
- IIHF

The tournament was held in Sheffield, Great Britain.

Pos	Team	Pld	W	OTW	OTL	L	GF	GA	GD	Pts	Qualification
1	Netherlands	3	2	1	0	0	5	1	+4	8	Final qualification
2	Great Britain (H)	3	2	0	1	0	6	3	+3	7	
3	Latvia	3	1	0	0	2	6	5	+1	3	
4	Spain	3	0	0	0	3	0	8	−8	0	

Source: IIHF
Rules for classification: 1) points; 2) head-to-head points; 3) head-to-head goal difference; 4) head-to-head number of goals scored; 5) result against closest best-ranked team outside tied teams; 6) result against second-best ranked team outside tied teams; 7) seeding before tournament.
(H) Host

All times are local (UTC±0).

12 December 2024; 12:30	Netherlands	2–0 (1–0, 0–0, 1–0)	Spain	iceSheffield, Sheffield; Attendance: 686

Game reference
Eline Gabriele	Goalies	Alba Gonzalo	Referee: (Germany) Caroline Butt; Linesmen: (Italy) Anna Callovini (United States) Melkanie Gotsdiner
Seppenwolde (Milders) (PP) – 08:12 / 1–0; Hamers (Zwarthoed) (SH) – 59:09 / 2–0			Referee: (Germany) Caroline Butt; Linesmen: (Italy) Anna Callovini (United States) Melkanie Gotsdiner
6 min	Penalties	8 min	Referee: (Germany) Caroline Butt; Linesmen: (Italy) Anna Callovini (United States) Melkanie Gotsdiner
34	Shots	23	Referee: (Germany) Caroline Butt; Linesmen: (Italy) Anna Callovini (United States) Melkanie Gotsdiner

12 December 2024; 16:00	Great Britain	3–2 (1–1, 2–1, 0–0)	Latvia	iceSheffield, Sheffield; Attendance: 380

Game reference

Ella Howard
Goalies
Kristiāna Apsīte
Referee:
(Slovakia) Michaela Matějová
Linesmen:
(Sweden) Ottilia Classon
(Netherlands) Amy Keijzers

Alderson-Smith (Gale) – 03:38	1–0
	1–1	04:10 – Miljone (Šilajāne)
Henry (Marsden) (PP) – 25:14	2–1
Gale (Henry, Alderson-Smith) – 26:45	3–1
	3–2	36:06 – Yip-Chuck (Šilajāne)

6 min
Penalties
6 min
38
Shots
16

14 December 2024; 12:30	Latvia	1–2 (0–1, 1–0, 0–1)	Netherlands	iceSheffield, Sheffield; Attendance: 320

Game reference

Kristiāna Apsīte
Goalies
Eline Gabriele
Referee:
(Canada) Beatrice Fortin
Linesmen:
(Italy) Anna Callovini
(Sweden) Ottilia Classon

	0–1	19:24 – Hamers
Yip-Chuck (Miljone) (PP) – 34:06	1–1
	1–2	53:29 – Wielenga (Dijkema, Hamers)

6 min
Penalties
16 min
22
Shots
34

14 December 2024; 16:00	Great Britain	3–0 (1–0, 0–0, 2–0)	Spain	iceSheffield, Sheffield; Attendance: 678

Game reference

Ella Howard
Goalies
Carolina Moreno
Referee:
(Slovakia) Michaela Matějová
Linesmen:
(United States) Melkanie Gotsdiner
(Norway) Mildrid Johnsen

Henry (Gale) – 09:48	1–0
Henry (Gale) – 53:42	2–0
Alderson-Smith (EN) – 58:55	3–0

16 min
Penalties
4 min
26
Shots
31

15 December 2024; 12:30	Spain	0–3 (0–2, 0–0, 0–1)	Latvia	iceSheffield, Sheffield; Attendance: 226

Game reference

Maria Sierra
Goalies
Kristiāna Apsīte
Referee:
(Canada) Beatrice Fortin
Linesmen:
(Italy) Anna Callovini
(Norway) Mildrid Johnsen

0–1	03:42 – A. Apsīte (Yip-Chuck, Miljone)
0–2	18:24 – Šilajāne (Yip-Chuck)
0–3	58:35 – Miljone (EN)

8 min
Penalties
6 min
28
Shots
30

15 December 2024; 16:00	Netherlands	1–0 OT (0–0, 0–0, 0–0) (OT: 1–0)	Great Britain	iceSheffield, Sheffield; Attendance: 703

Game reference
Eline Gabriele	Goalies	Ella Howard	Referee: (Germany) Caroline Butt; Linesmen: (United States) Melkanie Gotsdiner (Netherlands) Amy Keijzers
Wielenga – 64:14 / 1–0			Referee: (Germany) Caroline Butt; Linesmen: (United States) Melkanie Gotsdiner (Netherlands) Amy Keijzers
14 min	Penalties	8 min	Referee: (Germany) Caroline Butt; Linesmen: (United States) Melkanie Gotsdiner (Netherlands) Amy Keijzers
31	Shots	16	Referee: (Germany) Caroline Butt; Linesmen: (United States) Melkanie Gotsdiner (Netherlands) Amy Keijzers

=== Group F ===
Group F

Tournament details
- Host country: Poland
- City: Bytom
- Venue: 1 (in 1 host city)
- Dates: 12–15 December
- Teams: 4

Tournament statistics
- Games played: 6
- Goals scored: 35 (5.83 per game)
- Attendance: 2,027 (338 per game)
- Scoring leader: (Poland) Karolina Późniewska (5 points)

Official website
- IIHF

The tournament was held in Bytom, Poland.

Pos	Team	Pld	W	OTW	OTL	L	GF	GA	GD	Pts	Qualification
1	Poland (H)	3	3	0	0	0	19	1	+18	9	Final qualification
2	South Korea	3	2	0	0	1	10	5	+5	6	
3	Mexico	3	0	1	0	2	3	17	−14	2	
4	Chinese Taipei	3	0	0	1	2	3	12	−9	1	

Source: IIHF
Rules for classification: 1) points; 2) head-to-head points; 3) head-to-head goal difference; 4) head-to-head number of goals scored; 5) result against closest best-ranked team outside tied teams; 6) result against second-best ranked team outside tied teams; 7) seeding before tournament.
(H) Host

All times are local (UTC+1).

12 December 2024; 14:30	South Korea	6–0 (2–0, 4–0, 0–0)	Mexico	Bytom Arena, Bytom; Attendance: 50

Game reference

Cheon Hyo-seo
Goalies
Miranda De Antuñano
Referee:
(Japan) Mai Mizuhori
Linesmen:
(Slovenia) Katja Mrak
(Czech Republic) Alice Zábršová

Park Jo. – 09:07	1–0
Lee E. (Lee S.) – 11:07	2–0
Lee E. (Kim D.) – 26:49	3–0
Choi (Kang) – 27:57	4–0
Choi (Song) – 34:07	5–0
Lee S. (Han S.) (PP) – 37:33	6–0

2 min
Penalties
10 min
43
Shots
4

12 December 2024; 18:30	Poland	5–1 (1–0, 1–1, 3–0)	Chinese Taipei	Bytom Arena, Bytom; Attendance: 405

Game reference

Martyna Sass
Goalies
Chung Ai
Hsu Tzu-ting
Referee:
(United States) Tippy Hill
Linesmen:
(Japan) Niina Sato
(Germany) Julia Wagner

Dziwok (Onyshchenko) – 08:48	1–0
	1–1	33:28 – Chao (PP)
Korkuz (Tomczok, Czarnecka) – 39:38	2–1
Korkuz (Sikorska) (PP) – 47:39	3–1
Talanda – 55:13	4–1
Późniewska – 55:54	5–1

2 min
Penalties
6 min
53
Shots
18

13 December 2024; 14:30	Chinese Taipei	0–4 (0–2, 0–1, 0–1)	South Korea	Bytom Arena, Bytom; Attendance: 64

Game reference

Hsu Tzu-ting
Goalies
Kim Yeon-ju
Referee:
(Canada) Audrey-Anne Girard
Linesmen:
(France) Sueva Torribio-Rousselin
(Germany) Julia Wagner

0–1	03:42 – Park Jo.
0–2	08:29 – Choi (Lee S., Han Y.) (PP)
0–3	22:43 – Jung S. (Choi, Kang)
0–4	50:33 – Park Jo. (Kim D.)

8 min
Penalties
6 min
9
Shots
41

13 December 2024; 18:30	Poland	9–0 (1–0, 3–0, 5–0)	Mexico	Bytom Arena, Bytom; Attendance: 430

Game reference

Martyna Sass
Nadia Ratajczyk
Goalies
Daniela Castro
Miranda De Antuñano
Referee:
(Japan) Mai Mizuhori
Linesmen:
(Slovenia) Katja Mrak
(Japan) Niina Sato

Sikorska – 17:36	1–0
Sikorska (Talanda) – 25:49	2–0
Późniewska (Talanda) (PP) – 31:35	3–0
Łąpieś (Brzezińska) – 32:10	4–0
Brzezińska (Czarnecka) – 41:06	5–0
Mota (Górska) – 53:30	6–0
Łąpieś (Brzezińska, Czarnecka) – 54:55	7–0
Górska (Mota) – 57:53	8–0
Późniewska – 58:30	9–0

4 min
Penalties
10 min
53
Shots
12

15 December 2024; 12:15	Mexico	3–2 GWS (1–0, 1–0, 0–2) (OT: 0–0) (SO: 1–0)	Chinese Taipei	Bytom Arena, Bytom; Attendance: 60

Game reference

Miranda De Antuñano
Goalies
Hsu Tzu-ting
Referee:
(United States) Tippy Hill
Linesmen:
(France) Sueva Torribio-Rousselin
(Japan) Niina Sato

G. Rojas – 04:08	1–0
González (Wilson) – 25:10	2–0
	2–1	41:00 – Liu
	2–2	49:33 – Lin Ya. (Tan, Chang En-n.) (PP)

Amaya (miss)
J. Rojas (miss)
Chávez (miss)
G. Rojas
Heon (miss)
Chávez (miss)
J. Rojas (miss)
Ayala (miss)
G. Rojas
Amaya (miss)
Wilson (miss)
J. Rojas (miss)
González
Shootout
(miss) Hsu Ti.
Tan
(miss) Yeh H.
(miss) Chao
(miss) Huang Y.
(miss) Tan
(miss) Yeh H.
(miss) Chang En-n.
Huang M.
(miss) Huang M.
(miss) Tan
(miss) Huang M.
(miss) Liu
10 min
Penalties
2 min
29
Shots
38

15 December 2024; 16:15	South Korea	0–5 (0–1, 0–0, 0–4)	Poland	Bytom Arena, Bytom; Attendance: 1,018

Game reference

Kim Yeon-ju
Goalies
Martyna Sass
Referee:
(Canada) Audrey-Anne Girard
Linesmen:
(Germany) Julia Wagner
(Czech Republic) Alice Zábršová

0–1	10:20 – Sikorska (Późniewska, Talanda) (PP)
0–2	53:23 – Czarnecka (Brzezińska)
0–3	53:35 – Tomczok (Onyshchenko)
0–4	56:51 – Późniewska (Nosal) (EN)
0–5	59:44 – Huchel (Sikorska) (EN)

4 min
Penalties
6 min
32
Shots
20

== Final Olympic qualification ==
Twelve countries played in three tournaments from 6 to 9 February 2025 involving nations ranked 7th to 15th, and the three winners of the Round 2 tournaments. The winners advanced to the Olympic tournament and played in group B.

=== Group G ===
Group G

Tournament details
- Host country: Japan
- City: Tomakomai
- Venue: 1 (in 1 host city)
- Dates: 6–9 February 2025
- Teams: 4

Tournament statistics
- Games played: 6
- Goals scored: 38 (6.33 per game)
- Attendance: 6,367 (1,061 per game)
- Scoring leader: (France) Clara Rozier (7 points)

Official website
- IIHF

This tournament took place in Tomakomai, Japan.

Pos	Team	Pld	W	OTW	OTL	L	GF	GA	GD	Pts	Qualification
1	Japan (H)	3	3	0	0	0	17	2	+15	9	2026 Winter Olympics
2	France	3	2	0	0	1	14	8	+6	6	2026 Winter Olympics
3	China	3	0	1	0	2	5	10	−5	2	
4	Poland	3	0	0	1	2	2	18	−16	1	

Source: IIHF
Rules for classification: 1) points; 2) head-to-head points; 3) head-to-head goal difference; 4) head-to-head number of goals scored; 5) result against closest best-ranked team outside tied teams; 6) result against second-best ranked team outside tied teams; 7) seeding before tournament.
(H) Host

All times are local (UTC+9).

6 February 2025; 12:00	China	3–2 GWS (1–1, 0–0, 1–1) (OT: 0–0) (SO: 1–0)	Poland	Hakucho Arena, Tomakomai; Attendance: 713

Game reference

Zhan Jiahui
Goalies
Martyna Sass
Referees:
(Sweden) Ida Henriksson
(United States) Chelsea Rapin
Linesmen:
(Czech Republic) Kristýna Hájková
(Canada) Justine Todd

Hu – 16:49	1–0
	1–1	19:56 – Kot (Dziwok)
Fang (Liu S., Wang J.) (PP) – 42:41	2–1
	2–2	56:28 – Brzezińska (Czarnecka) (PP)

Zhu (miss)
Kong (miss)
Guan (miss)
Fang
Shootout
(miss) Późniewska
(miss) Talanda
(miss) Onyshchenko
(miss) Sikorska
(miss) Brzezińska
8 min
Penalties
8 min
36
Shots
41

6 February 2025; 15:30	Japan	7–1 (3–0, 2–1, 2–0)	France	Hakucho Arena, Tomakomai; Attendance: 1,069

Game reference

Miyuu Masuhara
Goalies
Justine Crousy-Théode
Margaux Mameri
Referees:
(United States) Melissa Doyle
(Czech Republic) Zuzana Svobodová
Linesmen:
(Canada) Laura Gutauskas
(Finland) Tiina Saarimäki

Ito (Ak. Shiga, Ao. Shiga) – 02:03	1–0
Wajima (Koike) – 07:30	2–0
Wajima – 15:27	3–0
Koyama – 22:24	4–0
Ito (Ak. Shiga, Ao. Shiga) – 28:26	5–0
	5–1	38:54 – Mesplède (Galbrun)
Rir. Noro – 42:49	6–1
Seki (Hitosato, Ukita) – 52:53	7–1

2 min
Penalties
8 min
41
Shots
24

8 February 2025; 12:00	China	1–4 (0–0, 0–1, 1–3)	France	Hakucho Arena, Tomakomai; Attendance: 685

Game reference

Zhan Jiahui
Goalies
Margaux Mameri
Referees:
(United States) Kelly Cooke
(United States) Chelsea Rapin
Linesmen:
(Canada) Alex Clarke
(Czech Republic) Kristýna Hájková

	0–1	38:21 – Huot-Marchand
	0–2	42:02 – Mesplède (Pélissou, Galbrun)
	0–3	49:46 – Nonnenmacher (Leclerc)
Wang J. (Liu C.) – 54:05	1–3
	1–4	55:17 – Villiot (Baudrit)

4 min
Penalties
8 min
15
Shots
41

8 February 2025; 15:30	Poland	0–6 (0–6, 0–0, 0–0)	Japan	Hakucho Arena, Tomakomai; Attendance: 1,609

Game reference

Martyna Sass
Goalies
Miyuu Masuhara
Referees:
(United States) Melissa Doyle
(Sweden) Ida Henriksson
Linesmen:
(Canada) Laura Gutauskas
(Canada) Justine Todd

0–1	05:54 – Maeda (Miura)
0–2	11:23 – Ak. Shiga (Ito)
0–3	14:12 – Wajima (Maeda, Miura)
0–4	15:32 – Ukita (Ak. Shiga, Ao. Shiga)
0–5	15:43 – Wajima (Miura)
0–6	18:26 – Ukita

2 min
Penalties
2 min
5
Shots
49

9 February 2025; 12:00	France	9–0 (6–0, 1–0, 2–0)	Poland	Hakucho Arena, Tomakomai; Attendance: 610

Game reference

Margaux Mameri
Goalies
Martyna Sass
Referees:
(United States) Kelly Cooke
(Czech Republic) Zuzana Svobodová
Linesmen:
(Canada) Laura Gutauskas
(Czech Republic) Kristýna Hájková

Huot-Marchand – 02:03	1–0
Rozier (Aurard) – 04:53	2–0
Rozier (Le Scodan, Duvin) (PP) – 11:24	3–0
Baudrit (Nonnenmacher, Huot-Marchand) – 13:37	4–0
Duvin (Aurard, Rozier) – 14:04	5–0
Rozier (Leclerc, Pélissou) – 18:53	6–0
Aurard (Duvin, Rozier) – 29:27	7–0
Duvin (Rozier, Aurard) – 58:14	8–0
Aurard (Rozier, Duvin) (PP) – 59:47	9–0

4 min
Penalties
4 min
55
Shots
18

9 February 2025; 15:30	Japan	4–1 (2–0, 1–1, 1–0)	China	Hakucho Arena, Tomakomai; Attendance: 1,681

Game reference

Riko Kawaguchi
Goalies
Zhan Jiahui
Referees:
(United States) Melissa Doyle
(Sweden) Ida Henriksson
Linesmen:
(Canada) Alex Clarke
(Finland) Tiina Saarimaki

Wajima (Maeda, Miura) (EA) – 03:26	1–0
Ukita (Ito) – 05:58	2–0
	2–1	27:05 – Yu (Kong) (PP)
Ak. Shiga (Ao. Shiga, Ito) – 39:18	3–1
Hosoyamada (Ak. Shiga) – 56:22	4–1

2 min
Penalties
8 min
54
Shots
5

=== Group H ===
Group H

Tournament details
- Host country: Sweden
- City: Gävle
- Venue: 1 (in 1 host city)
- Dates: 6–9 February 2025
- Teams: 4

Tournament statistics
- Games played: 6
- Goals scored: 31 (5.17 per game)
- Attendance: 6,718 (1,120 per game)
- Scoring leader(s): (Sweden) Sara Hjalmarsson (Sweden) Lisa Johansson (5 points)

Official website
- IIHF

This tournament took place in Gävle, Sweden.

Pos	Team	Pld	W	OTW	OTL	L	GF	GA	GD	Pts	Qualification
1	Sweden (H)	3	3	0	0	0	16	0	+16	9	2026 Winter Olympics
2	Denmark	3	2	0	0	1	6	7	−1	6	
3	Norway	3	0	1	0	2	5	9	−4	2	
4	Netherlands	3	0	0	1	2	4	15	−11	1	

Source: IIHF
Rules for classification: 1) points; 2) head-to-head points; 3) head-to-head goal difference; 4) head-to-head number of goals scored; 5) result against closest best-ranked team outside tied teams; 6) result against second-best ranked team outside tied teams; 7) seeding before tournament.
(H) Host

All times are local (UTC+1).

6 February 2025; 14:00	Denmark	3–1 (2–0, 0–1, 1–0)	Netherlands	Monitor ERP Arena, Gävle; Attendance: 380

Game reference

Emma-Sofie Nordstrøm
Goalies
Eline Gabriele
Referees:
(Latvia) Agnese Kārkliņa
(United States) Amanda Tassoni
Linesmen:
(United States) Erika Greenen
(Canada) Kirsten Welsh

Peters (Henriksen) – 04:01	1–0
Foss (Stauning, Russell) – 16:36	2–0
	2–1	37:18 – Van Nes (Wielenga) (PP)
Friis-Hansen (Glud) (EN) – 59:57	3–1

4 min
Penalties
6 min
26
Shots
19

6 February 2025; 18:00	Sweden	3–0 (1–0, 1–0, 1–0)	Norway	Monitor ERP Arena, Gävle; Attendance: 1,661

Game reference

Emma Söderberg
Goalies
Ena Nystrøm
Referees:
(Austria) Julia Kainberger
(Canada) Cianna Lieffers
Linesmen:
(United States) Sarah Buckner
(Canada) Jessica Chartrand

Blom (T. Johansson, Raunio) – 05:49	1–0
L. Johansson (Svensson, Nylén Persson) (PP) – 36:06	2–0
Ljungblom (Lundin) – 51:22	3–0

6 min
Penalties
6 min
54
Shots
11

7 February 2025; 14:00	Denmark	3–1 (0–0, 1–1, 2–0)	Norway	Monitor ERP Arena, Gävle; Attendance: 503

Game reference

Emma-Sofie Nordstrøm
Goalies
Ena Nystrøm
Referees:
(United States) Samantha Hiller
(Latvia) Agnese Kārkliņa
Linesmen:
(United States) Jennifer Cameron
(United States) Erika Greenen

	0–1	27:28 – Dalen (Bergesen, Sirum) (PP)
Friis-Hansen (Bergmann) – 31:32	1–1
Andersen (Jensen) – 57:37	2–1
Bergmann (EN) – 59:20	3–1

4 min
Penalties
6 min
30
Shots
19

7 February 2025; 18:00	Netherlands	0–8 (0–2, 0–4, 0–2)	Sweden	Monitor ERP Arena, Gävle; Attendance: 1,169

Game reference

Eline Gabriele
Goalies
Ida Boman
Referees:
(Austria) Julia Kainberger
(United States) Amanda Tassoni
Linesmen:
(Canada) Jessica Chartrand
(Canada) Kirsten Welsh

0–1	13:28 – Hjalmarsson (L. Johansson)
0–2	16:52 – Hjalmarsson (L. Johansson, Kjellbin)
0–3	26:29 – T. Johansson (Bergström)
0–4	27:38 – Lundin (Nylén Persson, Svensson)
0–5	32:39 – Karlsson (Hjalmarsson, Hedqvist) (PP)
0–6	35:39 – Bergström (Lundin)
0–7	55:26 – Bouveng (Hallin)
0–8	55:43 – Svensson (Raunio, Lundin)

4 min
Penalties
2 min
9
Shots
80

9 February 2025; 12:00	Norway	4–3 OT (0–2, 1–0, 2–1) (OT: 1–0)	Netherlands	Monitor ERP Arena, Gävle; Attendance: 173

Game reference

Ena Nystrøm
Goalies
Eline Gabriele
Referees:
(Austria) Julia Kainberger
(Latvia) Agnese Kārkliņa
Linesmen:
(Canada) Jessica Chartrand
(United States) Erika Greenen

	0–1	14:24 – Dijkema (Huisman, Milders)
	0–2	18:16 – De Jong (Hamers)
Dalen (Brunvold, Bergesen) (PP) – 31:06	1–2
Brunvold (Fischer, Bergesen) – 41:57	2–2
	2–3	55:56 – Wielenga (Seppenwolde, Milders)
Sirum (Bergesen, Dalen) (EN, EA) – 59:09	3–3
Fischer (Rustbakken, Sirum) – 61:11	4–3

4 min
Penalties
8 min
41
Shots
16

9 February 2025; 16:00	Sweden	5–0 (1–0, 2–0, 2–0)	Denmark	Monitor ERP Arena, Gävle; Attendance: 2,832

Game reference

Emma Söderberg
Goalies
Emma-Sofie Nordstrøm
Referees:
(United States) Samantha Hiller
(Canada) Cianna Lieffers
Linesmen:
(United States) Sarah Buckner
(United States) Jennifer Cameron

Raunio (Hjalmarsson, Thuvik) – 18:34	1–0
L. Johansson (Forsgren, Karlsson) – 23:21	2–0
L. Johansson (Svensson, Kjellbin) – 30:47	3–0
Hjalmarsson (Bergström) – 44:22	4–0
Raunio (Lundin) – 55:49	5–0

8 min
Penalties
4 min
56
Shots
11

=== Group I ===
Group I

Tournament details
- Host country: Germany
- City: Bremerhaven
- Venue: 1 (in 1 host city)
- Dates: 6–9 February 2025
- Teams: 4

Tournament statistics
- Games played: 6
- Goals scored: 31 (5.17 per game)
- Attendance: 8,140 (1,357 per game)
- Scoring leader: (Austria) Annika Fazokas (6 points)

Official website
- IIHF

The tournament took place at Eisarena Bremerhaven in Bremerhaven, Germany.

Pos	Team	Pld	W	OTW	OTL	L	GF	GA	GD	Pts	Qualification
1	Germany (H)	3	3	0	0	0	10	2	+8	9	2026 Winter Olympics
2	Hungary	3	1	1	0	1	7	5	+2	5	
3	Austria	3	1	0	1	1	10	7	+3	4	
4	Slovakia	3	0	0	0	3	4	17	−13	0	

Source: IIHF
Rules for classification: 1) points; 2) head-to-head points; 3) head-to-head goal difference; 4) head-to-head number of goals scored; 5) result against closest best-ranked team outside tied teams; 6) result against second-best ranked team outside tied teams; 7) seeding before tournament.
(H) Host

All times are local (UTC+1).

6 February 2025; 16:00	Hungary	3–1 (0–0, 1–1, 2–0)	Slovakia	Eisarena, Bremerhaven; Attendance: 494

Game reference

Anikó Németh
Goalies
Andrea Rišianová
Referees:
(Canada) Elizabeth Mantha
(Canada) Michelle McKenna
Linesmen:
(France) Alexia Cheyroux
(Canada) Erin Zach

	0–1	31:17 – Hlinka (Tóthová, Halušková)
Huszák (Mayer) (PP) – 33:13	1–1
Jókai Szilágyi (Kreisz, Mayer) – 43:22	2–1
Garát-Gasparics (EN) – 59:14	3–1

2 min
Penalties
8 min
38
Shots
26

6 February 2025; 19:30	Germany	2–0 (0–0, 2–0, 0–0)	Austria	Eisarena, Bremerhaven; Attendance: 1,360

Game reference
Sandra Abstreiter	Goalies	Selma Luggin	Referees: (Canada) Jennifer Berezowski (Finland) Anniina Nurmi; Linesmen: (Sweden) Jessica Lundgren (Czech Republic) Kamila Smetková
Haider (Schiefer, Botthof) – 23:03 / 1–0; Nix (Kluge) – 35:06 / 2–0			Referees: (Canada) Jennifer Berezowski (Finland) Anniina Nurmi; Linesmen: (Sweden) Jessica Lundgren (Czech Republic) Kamila Smetková
12 min	Penalties	8 min	Referees: (Canada) Jennifer Berezowski (Finland) Anniina Nurmi; Linesmen: (Sweden) Jessica Lundgren (Czech Republic) Kamila Smetková
36	Shots	18	Referees: (Canada) Jennifer Berezowski (Finland) Anniina Nurmi; Linesmen: (Sweden) Jessica Lundgren (Czech Republic) Kamila Smetková

8 February 2025; 14:30	Slovakia	1–6 (0–3, 0–1, 1–2)	Germany	Eisarena, Bremerhaven; Attendance: 2,570

Game reference

Andrea Rišianová
Simona Hupková
Goalies
Sandra Abstreiter
Referees:
(Canada) Jennifer Berezowski
(Canada) Michelle McKenna
Linesmen:
(France) Alexia Cheyroux
(Czech Republic) Kamila Smetková

	0–1	01:25 – Schiefer (Feldmeier)
	0–2	03:19 – Schaffrath (Kluge)
	0–3	05:48 – Voigt (Hark)
	0–4	28:04 – Voigt (Strobel, Lu. Welcke)
Hlinka (Halušková) – 43:13	1–4
	1–5	50:14 – Feldmeier (Haider)
	1–6	52:27 – Li. Welcke (Voigt, Strobel) (PP)

12 min
Penalties
8 min
19
Shots
42

8 February 2025; 18:00	Hungary	3–2 OT (0–1, 2–1, 0–0) (OT: 1–0)	Austria	Eisarena, Bremerhaven; Attendance: 455

Game reference

Anikó Németh
Goalies
Selma Luggin
Referees:
(Canada) Shauna Neary
(Finland) Anniina Nurmi
Linesmen:
(Germany) Leonie Ernst
(Sweden) Jessica Lundgren

	0–1	18:39 – Meixner (Matzka, Lintner)
Kreisz (Garát-Gasparics, Odnoga) – 23:15	1–1
Odnoga – 30:46	2–1
	2–2	31:39 – Mortl (Leitner, Trummer)
Hiezl (Kiss-Simon) – 61:00	3–2

0 min
Penalties
6 min
27
Shots
17

9 February 2025; 14:30	Austria	8–2 (1–0, 4–1, 3–1)	Slovakia	Eisarena, Bremerhaven; Attendance: 750

Game reference

Magdalena Luggin
Goalies
Simona Hupková
Referees:
(Canada) Jennifer Berezowski
(Canada) Michelle McKenna
Linesmen:
(France) Alexia Cheyroux
(Germany) Leonie Ernst

Schafzahl (Nagy) – 19:49	1–0
Fazokas (Kutzer, Trummer) – 22:09	2–0
Schafzahl (Meixner, Fazokas) – 27:00	3–0
Linzbichler (Pfeffer, Fazokas) – 29:49	4–0
Meixner (Schafzahl, Fazokas) (PP) – 36:10	5–0
	5–1	36:36 – Tóthová (Beňáková)
Matzka (Meixner, Fazokas) (PP2) – 40:54	6–1
	6–2	50:21 – Nemčeková
Schafzahl – 56:25	7–2
Fazokas (Schafzahl) (PP) – 59:59	8–2

4 min
Penalties
10 min
37
Shots
23

9 February 2025; 18:00	Germany	2–1 (0–0, 1–1, 1–0)	Hungary	Eisarena, Bremerhaven; Attendance: 2,511

Game reference

Sandra Abstreiter
Goalies
Anikó Németh
Referees:
(Canada) Elizabeth Mantha
(Canada) Shauna Neary
Linesmen:
(Sweden) Jessica Lundgren
(Canada) Erin Zach

Li. Welcke (Jobst-Smith, Lu. Welcke) (PP) – 27:39	1–0
	1–1	28:49 – Seregély (Hiezl, Odnoga) (PP)
Lu. Welcke (Li. Welcke, Jobst-Smith) – 43:34	2–1

8 min
Penalties
4 min
23
Shots
24
