= 2022 IIHF Women's World Championship Division II =

International ice hockey tournament

Tournament details
- Host countries: Spain; Croatia
- Venues: 2 (in 2 host cities)
- Dates: 3–8 April; 17–22 May
- Teams: 10

The 2022 IIHF Women's World Championship Division II consisted of two international ice hockey tournaments of the 2022 Women's Ice Hockey World Championships organized by the International Ice Hockey Federation (IIHF). Division II A and Division II B represent the fourth and fifth tier of the IIHF World Women's Championship.

Entering the competition, there were no divisional changes, as the 2021 event was cancelled due to the COVID-19 pandemic.

Great Britain won the Group A tournament and were promoted to Division I. Iceland won Group B and were promoted to Group A. Due to Russia's exclusion, no team was relegated this season.

== Group A tournament ==
2022 IIHF Women's World Championship Division II A

Tournament details
- Host country: Spain
- City: Jaca
- Venue: 1 (in 1 host city)
- Dates: 3–8 April
- Teams: 5

Tournament statistics
- Games played: 10
- Goals scored: 54 (5.4 per game)
- Attendance: 3,055 (306 per game)
- Scoring leader: (Latvia) Līga Miljone (7 points)

Official website
- www.iihf.com

The Division II Group A tournament was played in Jaca, Spain, from 3 to 8 April 2022.

=== Participating teams ===
Team	Qualification
Latvia	Placed 6th in 2019 Division I B and were relegated.
Great Britain	Placed 2nd in 2019 Division II A.
Spain	Hosts; placed 3rd in 2019 Division II A.
Mexico	Placed 4th in 2019 Division II A.
~~North Korea~~	Placed 5th in 2019 Division II A.
Chinese Taipei	Placed 1st in 2019 Division II B and were promoted.

=== Match officials ===
Three referees and five linesmen were selected for the tournament.

Referees	Linesmen
(United Kingdom) Hollie Neenan; (Norway) Rita Rygh; (United States) Charlotte Hurley	(Hungary) Bernadett Holzer; (Italy) Danielle Rostan; (Slovenia) Katja Mrak; (Spain) Claudia De La Pompa Carrera; (Sweden) Alexandra Kohl

=== Final standings ===
Pos	Team	Pld	W	OTW	OTL	L	GF	GA	GD	Pts	Promotion or relegation
1	Great Britain	4	4	0	0	0	18	1	+17	12	Promoted to the 2023 Division I B
2	Latvia	4	1	1	1	1	14	12	+2	6	
3	Spain (H)	4	1	1	0	2	6	6	0	5	
4	Chinese Taipei	4	1	0	1	2	10	20	−10	4	
5	Mexico	4	1	0	0	3	6	15	−9	3	
–	North Korea (Note: North Korea withdrew their team on 3 February 2022 because of the COVID-19 pandemic and the travel restrictions.)	0	0	0	0	0	0	0	0	0	Withdrawn

Source: IIHF
Rules for classification: 1) points; 2) head-to-head points; 3) head-to-head goal difference; 4) head-to-head number of goals scored; 5) result against closest best-ranked team outside tied teams; 6) result against second-best ranked team outside tied teams; 7) seeding before tournament.
(H) Host

=== Match results ===
All times are local (Central European Summer Time – UTC+2)

3 April 2022; 16:00	Chinese Taipei	0–8 (0–2, 0–2, 0–4)	Great Britain	Pabellón de Hielo de Jaca, Jaca; Attendance: 150

Game reference

Hsu Tzu-ting
Goalies
Nicole Jackson
Referee:
(Norway) Rita Rygh
Linesmen:
(Spain) Claudia De La Pompa Carrera
(Slovenia) Katja Mrak

0–1	01:16 – Headland (Wakeling, Traill)
0–2	15:12 – Traill (Marsden, Newman)
0–3	24:23 – Traill (Hill, Gale) (PP)
0–4	26:43 – Beal (Marsden, Newman)
0–5	55:43 – Bloom (Newman, Marsden) (PP)
0–6	57:12 – Hill (Allen, Marsden) (PP)
0–7	58:15 – Adams (Headland, Bloom) (PP2)
0–8	59:17 – Harris (Bloom) (PP)

16 min
Penalties
8 min
11
Shots
59

3 April 2022; 20:00	Latvia	0–1 GWS (0–0, 0–0, 0–0) (OT: 0–0) (SO: 0–1)	Spain	Pabellón de Hielo de Jaca, Jaca; Attendance: 300

Game reference
Kristiāna Apsīte	Goalies	Alba Gonzalo	Referee: (United Kingdom) Hollie Neenan; Linesmen: (Sweden) Alexandra Kohl (Italy) Danielle Rostan
Miljone; Yip-Chuck (miss); Pudule (miss); Mihejenko (miss); Kubliņa (miss)	Shootout	(miss) Scilipoti; Fernández; Muñoz; (miss) Ramos; (miss) Merino	Referee: (United Kingdom) Hollie Neenan; Linesmen: (Sweden) Alexandra Kohl (Italy) Danielle Rostan
10 min	Penalties	12 min	Referee: (United Kingdom) Hollie Neenan; Linesmen: (Sweden) Alexandra Kohl (Italy) Danielle Rostan
26	Shots	34	Referee: (United Kingdom) Hollie Neenan; Linesmen: (Sweden) Alexandra Kohl (Italy) Danielle Rostan

4 April 2022; 16:00	Mexico	2–4 (2–1, 0–1, 0–2)	Chinese Taipei	Pabellón de Hielo de Jaca, Jaca; Attendance: 117

Game reference

Mónica Renteria
Goalies
Wang Yun-tzu
Referee:
(United States) Charlotte Hurley
Linesmen:
(Hungary) Bernadett Holzer
(Slovenia) Katja Mrak

J. Rojas – 11:38	1–0
Amaya (Ayala) – 15:03	2–0
	2–1	16:35 – Wang (Sha) (SH)
	2–2	37:26 – Yeh (Pan)
	2–3	41:45 – Huang Y.
	2–4	59:30 – Huang Y. (EN)

14 min
Penalties
6 min
15
Shots
44

5 April 2022; 16:00	Mexico	2–8 (0–2, 1–3, 1–3)	Latvia	Pabellón de Hielo de Jaca, Jaca; Attendance: 104

Game reference

Miranda De Antuñano
Goalies
Kristiāna Apsīte
Referee:
(Norway) Rita Rygh
Linesmen:
(Spain) Claudia De La Pompa Carrera
(Italy) Danielle Rostan

	0–1	05:07 – Rulle (Žagare)
	0–2	19:47 – Kurme (Balode, Lagzdiņa)
Téllez (J. Rojas, G. Rojas) – 29:40	1–2
	1–3	33:14 – Miljone
	1–4	33:40 – Kubliņa
	1–5	39:58 – Yip-Chuck (Balode, Apsīte)
Chávez (Nevárez) – 47:29	2–5
	2–6	48:33 – Lagzdiņa (Kurme)
	2–7	48:45 – Mihejenko (Lagzdiņa, Miljone)
	2–8	51:25 – Miljone (Yip-Chuck, Rulle)

16 min
Penalties
6 min
26
Shots
38

5 April 2022; 20:00	Great Britain	3–1 (1–1, 0–0, 2–0)	Spain	Pabellón de Hielo de Jaca, Jaca; Attendance: 487

Game reference

Nicole Jackson
Goalies
Alba Gonzalo
Referee:
(United States) Charlotte Hurley
Linesmen:
(Hungary) Bernadett Holzer
(Sweden) Alexandra Kohl

	0–1	04:28 – Scilipoti (Serna)
Henry (Allen, Bloom) – 14:40	1–1
Adams (Beal) – 56:57	2–1
Marsden (Jackson) (SH, EN) – 59:40	3–1

12 min
Penalties
20 min
31
Shots
14

6 April 2022; 16:00	Chinese Taipei	5–6 OT (2–1, 3–0, 0–4) (OT: 0–1)	Latvia	Pabellón de Hielo de Jaca, Jaca; Attendance: 97

Game reference

Hsu Tzu-ting
Goalies
Kristiāna Apsīte
Guna Gailīte
Referee:
(United Kingdom) Hollie Neenan
Linesmen:
(Hungary) Bernadett Holzer
(Slovenia) Katja Mrak

	0–1	11:26 – Miljone (Rulle, Žagare)
Lin Yi. (Yeh) (PP) – 16:31	1–1
Pan) – 18:56	2–1
Huang Y. (Liu) (PP) – 23:05	3–1
Hsieh C. – 26:18	4–1
Huang Y. (Liu) – 29:19	5–1
	5–2	52:30 – Yip-Chuck (Kubliņa, Mihejenko)
	5–3	53:52 – Yip-Chuck (Miljone)
	5–4	57:46 – Miljone
	5–5	58:07 – Yip-Chuck (Žagare)
	5–6	60:27 – Miljone (Yip-Chuck)

4 min
Penalties
12 min
40
Shots
38

7 April 2022; 16:00	Great Britain	3–0 (0–0, 0–0, 3–0)	Mexico	Pabellón de Hielo de Jaca, Jaca; Attendance: 128

Game reference

Ella Howard
Goalies
Mónica Renteria
Referee:
(United States) Charlotte Hurley
Linesmen:
(Spain) Claudia De La Pompa Carrera
(Hungary) Bernadett Holzer

Allen (Jackson, Wakeling) – 41:40	1–0
Allen (Henry) – 44:59	2–0
Cartwright (Headland) – 50:08	3–0

4 min
Penalties
6 min
58
Shots
9

7 April 2022; 20:00	Spain	4–1 (0–1, 1–0, 3–0)	Chinese Taipei	Pabellón de Hielo de Jaca, Jaca; Attendance: 624

Game reference

Alba Gonzalo
Goalies
Hsu Tzu-ting
Referee:
(Norway) Rita Rygh
Linesmen:
(Sweden) Alexandra Kohl
(Italy) Danielle Rostan

	0–1	16:17 – Wang (Hsieh C.) (SH)
Aizpurúa (Bosch, Serrano) – 30:41	1–1
Serrano (Álvarez, O'Hare) – 43:16	2–1
Muñoz (Fernández, Rego) (PP) – 49:09	3–1
Ramos (Rego, Muñoz) – 56:53	4–1

4 min
Penalties
4 min
42
Shots
12

8 April 2022; 16:00	Latvia	0–4 (0–1, 0–0, 0–3)	Great Britain	Pabellón de Hielo de Jaca, Jaca; Attendance: 184

Game reference

Kristiāna Apsīte
Goalies
Nicole Jackson
Referee:
(United States) Charlotte Hurley
Linesmen:
(Spain) Claudia De La Pompa Carrera
(Sweden) Alexandra Kohl

0–1	09:05 – Jackson (Henry, Hill)
0–2	43:38 – Gale (Headland)
0–3	47:43 – Harris (Culshaw)
0–4	51:06 – Adams (Marsden, Beal) (PP2)

10 min
Penalties
6 min
22
Shots
53

8 April 2022; 20:00	Spain	0–2 (0–1, 0–0, 0–1)	Mexico	Pabellón de Hielo de Jaca, Jaca; Attendance: 864

Game reference
Alba Gonzalo	Goalies	Mónica Renteria	Referee: (United Kingdom) Hollie Neenan; Linesmen: (Slovenia) Katja Mrak (Italy) Danielle Rostan
0–1 / 12:37 – J. Rojas (Téllez); 0–2 / 59:20 – Amaya (EN)			Referee: (United Kingdom) Hollie Neenan; Linesmen: (Slovenia) Katja Mrak (Italy) Danielle Rostan
2 min	Penalties	6 min	Referee: (United Kingdom) Hollie Neenan; Linesmen: (Slovenia) Katja Mrak (Italy) Danielle Rostan
47	Shots	12	Referee: (United Kingdom) Hollie Neenan; Linesmen: (Slovenia) Katja Mrak (Italy) Danielle Rostan

=== Statistics ===
==== Scoring leaders ====
List shows the top skaters sorted by points, then goals.

Player	GP	G	A	Pts	+/−	PIM	POS
(Latvia) Līga Miljone	4	5	2	7	+5	2	F
(Latvia) Krista Yip-Chuck	4	4	2	6	+6	0	F
(United Kingdom) Kathryn Marsden	4	1	5	6	+5	4	F
(United Kingdom) Saffron Allen	4	2	2	4	+3	2	F
(United Kingdom) Aimee Headland	4	1	3	4	+3	2	F
(United Kingdom) Louise Adams	4	3	0	3	+4	2	F
(Chinese Taipei) Huang Yun-chu	4	3	0	3	−3	2	F
(Mexico) Joanna Rojas	3	2	1	3	−2	2	F
(Chinese Taipei) Yeh Hui-chen	3	2	1	3	+1	2	F
(United Kingdom) Casey Traill	4	2	1	3	+5	2	D

GP = Games played; G = Goals; A = Assists; Pts = Points; +/− = Plus/Minus; PIM = Penalties in Minutes; POS = Position
Source: IIHF.com

==== Goaltending leaders ====
Only the top five goaltenders, based on save percentage, who have played at least 40% of their team's minutes, are included in this list.

Player	TOI	GA	GAA	SA	Sv%	SO
(United Kingdom) Nicole Jackson	180:00	1	0.33	47	97.87	2
(Mexico) Mónica Renteria	179:57	6	2.00	148	95.95	1
(Spain) Alba Gonzalo	241:49	4	0.99	79	94.94	1
(Latvia) Kristiāna Apsīte	231:37	9	2.33	145	93.79	1
(Chinese Taipei) Hsu Tzu-ting	180:27	18	5.99	139	87.05	0

TOI = time on ice (minutes:seconds); SA = shots against; GA = goals against; GAA = goals against average; Sv% = save percentage; SO = shutouts
Source: IIHF.com

=== Awards ===
Position	Player
Goaltender	(Spain) Alba Gonzalo
Defenceman	(United Kingdom) Casey Traill
Forward	(Latvia) Līga Miljone

== Group B tournament ==
2022 IIHF Women's World Championship Division II B

Tournament details
- Host country: Croatia
- City: Zagreb
- Venue: 1 (in 1 host city)
- Dates: 17–22 May
- Teams: 5

Tournament statistics
- Games played: 10
- Goals scored: 102 (10.2 per game)
- Attendance: 116 (12 per game)
- Scoring leader: (Turkey) Dilara Lökbaş (14 points)

Official website
- www.iihf.com

The Division II Group B tournament was played in Zagreb, Croatia, from 17 to 22 May 2022.

After several teams withdrew from the tournament, the IIHF changed the date from March to mid-May and all six teams are eligible to participate.

=== Participating teams ===
Team	Qualification
Australia	Placed 1st in 2020 Division II B.
Iceland	Placed 2nd in 2020 Division II B.
~~New Zealand~~	Placed 3rd in 2020 Division II B.
Turkey	Placed 4th in 2020 Division II B.
Croatia	Hosts; placed 5th in 2020 Division II B.
South Africa	Placed 1st in 2020 Division III and were promoted.

=== Match officials ===
Three referees and five linesmen were selected for the tournament.

Referees	Linesmen
(Austria) Ulrike Winklmayr; (Lithuania) Ramunė Maleckienė; (Turkey) İlkşen Acar	(Finland) Helina Anttila; (Netherlands) Kaitlyn van de Wijgert; (Poland) Monika Szpyt; (Switzerland) Jennifer Vicha; (United Arab Emirates) Fatima Al-Ali

=== Final standings ===
Pos	Team	Pld	W	OTW	OTL	L	GF	GA	GD	Pts	Promotion or relegation
1	Iceland	4	3	1	0	0	26	5	+21	11	Promoted to the 2023 Division II A
2	Australia (Note: Australia withdrew their team on 4 January 2022 because of the COVID-19 pandemic and the related travel issues but rejoined the tournament after it was moved to a later date.)	4	3	0	1	0	38	2	+36	10	
3	Turkey	4	2	0	0	2	28	13	+15	6	
4	South Africa	4	1	0	0	3	4	39	−35	3	
5	Croatia (H)	4	0	0	0	4	6	43	−37	0	
–	New Zealand (Note: New Zealand withdrew their team on 17 December 2021 because of the COVID-19 pandemic.)	0	0	0	0	0	0	0	0	0	Withdrawn

Source: IIHF
Rules for classification: 1) points; 2) head-to-head points; 3) head-to-head goal difference; 4) head-to-head number of goals scored; 5) result against closest best-ranked team outside tied teams; 6) result against second-best ranked team outside tied teams; 7) seeding before tournament.
(H) Host

=== Match results ===
All times are local (Central European Summer Time – UTC+2)

17 May 2022; 16:00	South Africa	1–10 (0–5, 0–3, 1–2)	Iceland	Dvorana Velesajam, Zagreb; Attendance: 6

Game reference

Shaylene Rorke
Goalies
Birta Helgudóttir
Andrea Bachmann
Referee:
(Turkey) İlkşen Acar
Linesmen:
(United Arab Emirates) Fatima Al-Ali
(Poland) Monika Szpyt

	0–1	04:46 – Árnadóttir (Jóhannsdóttir)
	0–2	07:13 – Hjaltested (Leifsdóttir)
	0–3	10:49 – Su. Björgvinsdóttir (Si. Björgvinsdóttir) (PP)
	0–4	14:09 – Si. Björgvinsdóttir
	0–5	18:07 – Bergsdóttir (Leifsdóttir, Hjaltested)
	0–6	23:06 – Björnsdóttir
	0–7	26:33 – Si. Björgvinsdóttir (Su. Björgvinsdóttir)
	0–8	34:11 – Bergsdóttir
	0–9	41:31 – Jóhannsdóttir (Garðarsdóttir)
	0–10	51:57 – Si. Björgvinsdóttir (Su. Björgvinsdóttir)
Van Doesburgh (Rhode) (PP) – 56:56	1–10

2 min
Penalties
6 min
4
Shots
51

17 May 2022; 19:45	Australia	7–0 (2–0, 2–0, 3–0)	Turkey	Dvorana Velesajam, Zagreb; Attendance: 15

Game reference

Olivia Last
Goalies
Merve Karataş
Referee:
(Austria) Ulrike Winklmayr
Linesmen:
(Finland) Helina Anttila
(Netherlands) Kaitlyn van de Wijgert

Sammons (Kiliwnik) – 10:24	1–0
Sammons (Davis-Tope) – 19:58	2–0
Sharp (Green) – 22:24	3–0
Pethrick (Davis-Tope, Clark-Crumpton) – 24:17	4–0
Sharp (Clark-Crumpton, Green) – 51:25	5–0
Pethrick (Aparicio) – 52:42	6–0
Clark-Crumpton (Ellis) – 57:59	7–0

2 min
Penalties
2 min
41
Shots
17

18 May 2022; 18:00	Croatia	2–3 (0–0, 1–1, 1–2)	South Africa	Dvorana Velesajam, Zagreb; Attendance: 13

Game reference

Julia Baždar
Goalies
Shaylene Rorke
Referee:
(Lithuania) Ramunė Maleckienė
Linesmen:
(United Arab Emirates) Fatima Al-Ali
(Switzerland) Jennifer Vicha

Matak (Marinković) – 24:16	1–0
	1–1	27:35 – Meyer
	1–2	45:01 – Schuurman (Rhode, Keuler)
Krušelj Posavec (PP) – 50:38	2–2
	2–3	50:58 – Van Doesburgh

8 min
Penalties
6 min
40
Shots
23

19 May 2022; 16:00	Iceland	3–2 (1–0, 1–2, 1–0)	Turkey	Dvorana Velesajam, Zagreb; Attendance: 9

Game reference

Birta Helgudóttir
Goalies
Merve Karataş
Referee:
(Lithuania) Ramunė Maleckienė
Linesmen:
(Finland) Helina Anttila
(Poland) Monika Szpyt

Kjartansdóttir (Jóhannsdóttir, Garðarsdóttir) – 13:29	1–0
Árnadóttir (Alexdóttir, Garðarsdóttir) – 23:08	2–0
	2–1	25:50 – Taygar (Güven, D. Lökbaş) (PP2)
	2–2	35:55 – Taygar
Su. Björgvinsdóttir (Si. Björgvinsdóttir, Geirsdóttir) – 42:11	3–2

14 min
Penalties
0 min
38
Shots
22

19 May 2022; 19:45	Croatia	0–13 (0–4, 0–6, 0–3)	Australia	Dvorana Velesajam, Zagreb; Attendance: 13

Game reference

Julija Baždar
Mirna Sertić
Goalies
Tina Girdler
Referee:
(Turkey) İlkşen Acar
Linesmen:
(Netherlands) Kaitlyn van de Wijgert
(Switzerland) Jennifer Vicha

0–1	02:21 – Clark-Crumpton
0–2	04:22 – Malcolm
0–3	09:35 – Green
0–4	17:19 – Tihema
0–5	20:23 – Pethrick (PP)
0–6	20:31 – Sammons
0–7	25:18 – Clark-Crumpton
0–8	30:13 – Mahoney
0–9	37:37 – Mahoney
0–10	39:53 – Davis-Tope
0–11	47:48 – Kiliwnik
0–12	48:05 – Mahoney
0–13	53:57 – Pullin

8 min
Penalties
2 min
5
Shots
61

20 May 2022; 18:00	South Africa	0–17 (0–5, 0–6, 0–6)	Australia	Dvorana Velesajam, Zagreb; Attendance: 6

Game reference

Shaylene Rorke
Monique van Dyk
Goalies
Tina Girdler
Referee:
(Austria) Ulrike Winklmayr
Linesmen:
(United Arab Emirates) Fatima Al-Ali
(Netherlands) Kaitlyn van de Wijgert

0–1	02:06 – Clark-Crumpton (Tihema, Ellis)
0–2	05:59 – Van der Wolf (Clark-Crumpton, Tihema)
0–3	14:09 – Clark-Crumpton (Tihema, Van der Wolf)
0–4	15:54 – Malcolm (Green)
0–5	18:12 – Van der Wolf (Clark-Crumpton)
0–6	22:29 – Van der Wolf (Clark-Crumpton)
0–7	26:12 – Kiliwnik (Sammons, Harvey)
0–8	29:28 – Aparicio
0–9	29:48 – Davis-Tope (Goonan, Pullin)
0–10	34:51 – Clark-Crumpton (Sammons, Tihema)
0–11	36:56 – Sammons (Harvey, Davis-Tope)
0–12	47:50 – Cochrane (Aparicio, Mahoney)
0–13	48:43 – Davis-Tope (Sammons, Kiliwnik)
0–14	49:53 – Van der Wolf (Clark-Crumpton)
0–15	55:36 – Davis-Tope (Sammons, Ellis)
0–16	59:23 – Kiliwnik (Sammons, Davis-Tope)
0–17	59:52 – Van der Wolf (Tihema)

0 min
Penalties
2 min
6
Shots
77

21 May 2022; 16:00	Turkey	10–0 (3–0, 1–0, 6–0)	South Africa	Dvorana Velesajam, Zagreb; Attendance: 9

Game reference

Merve Karataş
Azra Sert
Goalies
Shaylene Rorke
Referee:
(Lithuania) Ramunė Maleckienė
Linesmen:
(United Arab Emirates) Fatima Al-Ali
(Finland) Helina Anttila

D. Lökbaş (Koçak) – 00:35	1–0
D. Lökbaş (Koçak) – 10:33	2–0
Kjartansdóttir (D. Lökbaş, Taygar) (PP) – 14:26	3–0
Demirkol (Bağcı, Kutluca) – 22:03	4–0
Taygar (D. Lökbaş, Güven) – 40:26	5–0
D. Lökbaş (Taygar, Koçak) – 40:48	6–0
Koçak – 44:16	7–0
D. Lökbaş (Koçak, Taygar) – 47:16	8–0
Güven (Kutluca) – 53:07	9–0
Koçak (Lökbaş, Taygar) – 55:45	10–0

4 min
Penalties
8 min
47
Shots
8

21 May 2022; 19:45	Iceland	11–1 (3–0, 4–0, 4–1)	Croatia	Dvorana Velesajam, Zagreb; Attendance: 17

Game reference

Birta Helgudóttir
Andrea Bachmann
Goalies
Julija Baždar
Mirna Sertić
Referee:
(Austria) Ulrike Winklmayr
Linesmen:
(Poland) Monika Szpyt
(Switzerland) Jennifer Vicha

Guðbjartsdóttir (Eiriksdóttir, Björnsdóttir) – 01:07	1–0
Si. Björgvinsdóttir (Geirsdóttir, Su. Björgvinsdóttir) – 04:56	2–0
Su. Björgvinsdóttir (Si. Björgvinsdóttir) – 19:20	3–0
Árnadóttir (Blöndal, Jóhannsdóttir) – 22:25	4–0
Geirsdóttir (Su. Björgvinsdóttir, Ágústsdóttir) – 23:55	5–0
Leifsdóttir (Bergsdóttir, Kjartansdóttir) – 30:00	6–0
Si. Björgvinsdóttir (Su. Björgvinsdóttir, Geirsdóttir) – 31:57	7–0
Si. Björgvinsdóttir (Blöndal) – 43:13	8–0
Hjaltested (Leifsdóttir) – 43:43	9–0
Kjartansdóttir (Su. Björgvinsdóttir, Sigfinnsdóttir) – 49:22	10–0
Hjaltested (Aradóttir) (SH) – 57:46	11–0
	11–1	58:13 – E. Čavka (Matak) (PP)

4 min
Penalties
2 min
54
Shots
9

22 May 2022; 16:00	Australia	1–2 GWS (0–0, 0–1, 1–0) (OT: 0–0) (SO: 0–1)	Iceland	Dvorana Velesajam, Zagreb; Attendance: 13

Game reference
Olivia Last	Goalies	Birta Helgudóttir	Referee: (Austria) Ulrike Winklmayr; Linesmen: (Finland) Helina Anttila (Poland) Monika Szpyt
/ 0–1 / 37:37 – Su. Björgvinsdóttir (Snorradóttir, Si. Björgvinsdóttir); Van der Wolf (Clark-Crumpton, Harvey) – 47:31 / 1–1			Referee: (Austria) Ulrike Winklmayr; Linesmen: (Finland) Helina Anttila (Poland) Monika Szpyt
Davis-Tope (miss); Van der Wolf (miss); Clark-Crumpton (miss); Sammons (miss); Sharp (miss); Green (miss)	Shootout	(miss) Si. Björgvinsdóttir; (miss) Su. Björgvinsdóttir; (miss) Snorradóttir; (miss) Kjartansdóttir; (miss) Geirsdóttir; Si. Björgvinsdóttir	Referee: (Austria) Ulrike Winklmayr; Linesmen: (Finland) Helina Anttila (Poland) Monika Szpyt
4 min	Penalties	6 min	Referee: (Austria) Ulrike Winklmayr; Linesmen: (Finland) Helina Anttila (Poland) Monika Szpyt
35	Shots	30	Referee: (Austria) Ulrike Winklmayr; Linesmen: (Finland) Helina Anttila (Poland) Monika Szpyt

22 May 2022; 19:45	Turkey	16–3 (3–2, 7–1, 6–0)	Croatia	Dvorana Velesajam, Zagreb; Attendance: 15

Game reference

Merve Karataş
Azra Sert
Goalies
Julija Baždar
Mirna Sertić
Referee:
(Turkey) İlkşen Acar
Linesmen:
(Netherlands) Kaitlyn van de Wijgert
(Switzerland) Jennifer Vicha

Alex – 04:31	1–0
Koçak (D. Lökbaş) – 11:22	2–0
	2–1	12:13 – Krušelj Posavec
	2–2	14:22 – Krušelj Posavec
D. Lökbaş (A Lökbaş) – 17:45	3–2
D. Lökbaş – 21:30	4–2
Demir – 23:00	5–2
Koçak (Taygar) – 24:51	6–2
D. Lökbaş – 27:20	7–2
	7–3	28:13 – Marinković (T. Čavka)
Taygar (D. Lökbaş) – 31:25	8–3
D. Lökbaş (Taygar) – 32:01	9–3
Güven (Taygar, Koçak) – 38:52	10–3
Oğuz – 41:24	11–3
Gerez – 44:20	12–3
Güven – 47:33	13–3
Kutluca (PP) – 50:17	14–3
Tüzgen (Güven) – 51:29	15–3
D. Lökbaş (Koçak) – 51:35	16–3

4 min
Penalties
4 min
55
Shots
28

=== Statistics ===
==== Scoring leaders ====
List shows the top skaters sorted by points, then goals.

Player	GP	G	A	Pts	+/−	PIM	POS
(Turkey) Dilara Lökbaş	4	9	5	14	+14	0	F
(Australia) Michelle Clark-Crumpton	4	6	7	13	+15	0	F
(Turkey) Betül Taygar	4	4	7	11	+11	0	F
(Iceland) Silvia Björgvinsdóttir	4	6	4	10	+10	0	F
(Iceland) Sunna Björgvinsdóttir	4	4	6	10	+11	0	F
(Turkey) Ayşe Koçak	4	4	6	10	+12	0	F
(Australia) Sara Sammons	4	4	5	9	+10	0	F
(Australia) Emily Davis-Tope	4	4	4	8	+8	0	F
(Australia) Kristelle van der Wolf	4	6	1	7	+14	0	F
(Turkey) Sema Güven	4	3	3	6	+5	6	D

GP = Games played; G = Goals; A = Assists; Pts = Points; +/− = Plus/Minus; PIM = Penalties in Minutes; POS = Position
Source: IIHF.com

==== Goaltending leaders ====
Only the top five goaltenders, based on save percentage, who have played at least 40% of their team's minutes, are included in this list.

Player	TOI	GA	GAA	SA	Sv%	SO
(Australia) Tina Girdler	120:00	0	0.00	11	100.00	2
(Australia) Olivia Last	125:00	1	0.48	46	97.83	1
(Iceland) Birta Helgudóttir	185:00	3	0.97	61	95.08	0
(Turkey) Merve Karataş	219:32	13	3.55	112	88.39	0
(South Africa) Shaylene Rorke	230:36	36	9.37	199	81.91	0

TOI = time on ice (minutes:seconds); SA = shots against; GA = goals against; GAA = goals against average; Sv% = save percentage; SO = shutouts
Source: IIHF.com

=== Awards ===
Position	Player
Goaltender	(Iceland) Birta Helgudóttir
Defenceman	(Australia) Rylie Ellis
Forward	(Iceland) Silvia Björgvinsdóttir
