= 2022 Women's Ice Hockey World Championships =

Tournament details
- Host countries: Denmark; France; Poland; Spain; Croatia; Bulgaria; Serbia
- Venues: 8 (in 8 host cities)
- Teams: 44

Final positions
- Champions: Canada (12th title)
- Runners-up: United States
- Third place: Czechia

The 2022 Women's Ice Hockey World Championships were the 25th such series of tournaments organized by the International Ice Hockey Federation. Teams participated at several levels of competition. These tournaments also served as qualifications for the 2023 competition.

Teams from Russia and Belarus were not allowed to enter, as they were suspended by the IIHF due to the countries' invasion of Ukraine.

== Championship (Top Division) ==
After the top division was paused every four years (during the Olympics), a new proposal called for the tournament to be played every year from 2022 onward. The proposal was adopted on 22 September 2021. The tournament was held in Herning and Frederikshavn, Denmark, from 25 August to 4 September 2022.

Pos	Grp	Team	Pld	W	OTW	OTL	L	GF	GA	GD	Pts	Final result
1	A	Canada	7	6	0	0	1	32	9	+23	18	Champions
2	A	United States	7	6	0	0	1	53	7	+46	18	Runners-up
3	B	Czechia	7	5	1	0	1	28	15	+13	17	Third place
4	A	Switzerland	7	1	1	0	5	9	31	−22	5	Fourth place
5	A	Japan	7	1	1	1	4	11	37	−26	6	Fifth place game
6	A	Finland	7	2	1	2	2	19	18	+1	10	Fifth place game
7	B	Sweden	6	1	2	0	3	16	18	−2	7	
8	B	Hungary	6	1	0	2	3	10	28	−18	5	
9	B	Germany	4	1	0	1	2	8	16	−8	4	Eliminated in Preliminary round
10	B	Denmark	4	1	0	0	3	6	13	−7	3	Relegated to the 2023 Division I A

Source: IIHF
Rules for classification: 1) position in the group; 2) number of points; 3) goal difference; 4) goals scored; 5) seeding before tournament.

== Division I ==
=== Group A ===
The Division I Group A tournament was played in Angers, France, from 24 to 30 April 2022.

Pos	Team	Pld	W	OTW	OTL	L	GF	GA	GD	Pts	Promotion
1	France (H)	4	3	0	1	0	14	5	+9	10	Promoted to the 2023 Top Division
2	Norway	4	2	0	1	1	13	10	+3	7	
3	Slovakia	4	2	0	0	2	7	8	−1	6 (Note: Austria 1–2 Slovakia)	
4	Austria	4	0	3	0	1	10	8	+2	6	
5	Netherlands	4	0	0	1	3	4	17	−13	1	

Source: IIHF
Rules for classification: 1) points; 2) head-to-head points; 3) head-to-head goal difference; 4) head-to-head number of goals scored; 5) result against closest best-ranked team outside tied teams; 6) result against second-best ranked team outside tied teams; 7) seeding before tournament.
(H) Host

=== Group B ===
The Division I Group B tournament was played in Katowice, Poland, from 8 to 14 April 2022.

Pos	Team	Pld	W	OTW	OTL	L	GF	GA	GD	Pts	Promotion or relegation
1	China	5	5	0	0	0	38	9	+29	15	Promoted to the 2023 Division I A
2	Poland (H)	5	3	1	0	1	16	13	+3	11	
3	Italy	5	2	0	1	2	11	15	−4	7	
4	Kazakhstan	5	2	0	0	3	10	11	−1	6	
5	South Korea	5	1	0	0	4	5	15	−10	3 (Note: South Korea 2–1 Slovenia)	
6	Slovenia	5	1	0	0	4	6	23	−17	3	

Source: IIHF
Rules for classification: 1) points; 2) head-to-head points; 3) head-to-head goal difference; 4) head-to-head number of goals scored; 5) result against closest best-ranked team outside tied teams; 6) result against second-best ranked team outside tied teams; 7) seeding before tournament.
(H) Host

== Division II ==
=== Group A ===
The Division II Group A tournament was played in Jaca, Spain, from 3 to 8 April 2022.

Pos	Team	Pld	W	OTW	OTL	L	GF	GA	GD	Pts	Promotion or relegation
1	Great Britain	4	4	0	0	0	18	1	+17	12	Promoted to the 2023 Division I B
2	Latvia	4	1	1	1	1	14	12	+2	6	
3	Spain (H)	4	1	1	0	2	6	6	0	5	
4	Chinese Taipei	4	1	0	1	2	10	20	−10	4	
5	Mexico	4	1	0	0	3	6	15	−9	3	
–	North Korea (Note: North Korea withdrew their team on 3 February 2022 because of the COVID-19 pandemic and the travel restrictions.)	0	0	0	0	0	0	0	0	0	Withdrawn

Source: IIHF
Rules for classification: 1) points; 2) head-to-head points; 3) head-to-head goal difference; 4) head-to-head number of goals scored; 5) result against closest best-ranked team outside tied teams; 6) result against second-best ranked team outside tied teams; 7) seeding before tournament.
(H) Host

=== Group B ===
The Division II Group B tournament was played in Zagreb, Croatia, from 17 to 22 May 2022.

Pos	Team	Pld	W	OTW	OTL	L	GF	GA	GD	Pts	Promotion or relegation
1	Iceland	4	3	1	0	0	26	5	+21	11	Promoted to the 2023 Division II A
2	Australia (Note: Australia withdrew their team on 4 January 2022 because of the COVID-19 pandemic and the related travel issues but rejoined the tournament after it was moved to a later date.)	4	3	0	1	0	38	2	+36	10	
3	Turkey	4	2	0	0	2	28	13	+15	6	
4	South Africa	4	1	0	0	3	4	39	−35	3	
5	Croatia (H)	4	0	0	0	4	6	43	−37	0	
–	New Zealand (Note: New Zealand withdrew their team on 17 December 2021 because of the COVID-19 pandemic.)	0	0	0	0	0	0	0	0	0	Withdrawn

Source: IIHF
Rules for classification: 1) points; 2) head-to-head points; 3) head-to-head goal difference; 4) head-to-head number of goals scored; 5) result against closest best-ranked team outside tied teams; 6) result against second-best ranked team outside tied teams; 7) seeding before tournament.
(H) Host

== Division III ==
=== Group A ===
The Division III Group A tournament was played in Sofia, Bulgaria, from 4 to 7 April 2022.

Pos	Team	Pld	W	OTW	OTL	L	GF	GA	GD	Pts	Promotion or relegation
1	Belgium	4	3	0	0	1	26	3	+23	9 (Note: Belgium and Lithuania are tied on head-to-head points (3–3); head-to-head goal difference: Belgium +7, Lithuania –7.)	Promoted to the 2023 Division II B
2	Lithuania	4	3	0	0	1	14	15	−1	9	
3	Bulgaria (H)	4	0	0	0	4	5	27	−22	0	
–	Romania (Note: Romania withdrew their team on 25 March 2022 because of the COVID-19 pandemic.)	0	0	0	0	0	0	0	0	0	Withdrawn
–	Ukraine (Note: Ukraine withdrew due to the 2022 Russian invasion of Ukraine.)	0	0	0	0	0	0	0	0	0	Withdrawn
–	Hong Kong (Note: Hong Kong withdrew their team on 3 March 2022 because of the COVID-19 pandemic.)	0	0	0	0	0	0	0	0	0	Withdrawn

Source: IIHF
Rules for classification: 1) points; 2) head-to-head points; 3) head-to-head goal difference; 4) head-to-head number of goals scored; 5) result against closest best-ranked team outside tied teams; 6) result against second-best ranked team outside tied teams; 7) seeding before tournament.
(H) Host

=== Group B ===
The Division III Group B tournament was played in Belgrade, Serbia, from 22 to 25 March 2022.

Pos	Team	Pld	W	OTW	OTL	L	GF	GA	GD	Pts	Promotion
1	Estonia	3	3	0	0	0	24	1	+23	9	Promoted to the 2023 Division III A
2	Serbia (H)	3	2	0	0	1	11	5	+6	6	
3	Bosnia and Herzegovina	3	1	0	0	2	7	16	−9	3	
4	Israel	3	0	0	0	3	1	21	−20	0	
–	Iran (Note: Iran was scheduled to participate, but withdrew in September 2021 to avoid competing against Israel.)	0	0	0	0	0	0	0	0	0	Withdrawn

Source: IIHF
Rules for classification: 1) points; 2) head-to-head points; 3) head-to-head goal difference; 4) head-to-head number of goals scored; 5) result against closest best-ranked team outside tied teams; 6) result against second-best ranked team outside tied teams; 7) seeding before tournament.
(H) Host
