= Līga Miljone =

Latvian ice hockey player (born 1997)

- Born: March 20, 1997 (age 29) Rīga, Latvia
- Height: 155 cm (5 ft 1 in)
- Weight: 58 kg (128 lb; 9 st 2 lb)
- Position: Right Wing
- Shoots: Left
- EWHL team Former teams: VSV Lady Hawks: CH Jaca; Maine Black Bears; Leksands IF; MODO Hockey; SHK Laima Rīga
- National team: Latvia
- Playing career: 2007–present

Līga Miljone (born March 20, 1997) is a Latvian ice hockey player. Miljone has been a member of Latvian national team since 2013 and has participated in eleven IIHF Women's World Championships at the Division IA, IB, and IIA levels.

Prior to her college ice hockey career, Miljone played five seasons in the Swedish Women's Hockey League (SDHL), spending two seasons with MODO Hockey (2013–2015) and three seasons with Leksands IF (2015–2018). Miljone has played three seasons (2018–2021) with Maine Black Bears in the Hockey East conference of the NCAA Division I. Afterwards Miljone spent one season (2022-2023) in Spain, playing for Club Hielo Jaca of the La Liga Nacional de Hockey Hielo femenina. Followed up by three seasons in Austria, playing for VSV Lady Hawks in Austrian Dameneishockey-Bundesliga (DEBL), Slovenian Women's Hockey League (IntHL), European Women's Hockey League (EWHL) and Austrian Women's Hockey League (AWHL).

Miljone and her mother, Inese Geca-Miljone, made history as the first mother-daughter duo to play in the same IIHF World Women's Championship, first appearing together at the 2013 Division IA tournament, and again in 2014 and 2016. At the 2017 IIHF Women's World Championship they represented Latvia as player and coach.

== Playing career ==
Miljone participated in the IIHF European Women's Champions Cup (EWCC) in 2013 with SHK Laima Rīga. The fifteen year old lead the team with a total of 3 points in three games, recording 2 points (1 goal+1 assist) against Vålerenga Ishockey and netting Laima's lone goal against Hvidovre IK. Laima lost all three round robin games in the first round and did not progress in the tournament.

=== SDHL ===
For the 2013–14 season, Miljone moved from her native Latvia to Örnsköldsvik, Sweden in order to play with Modo Hockey Dam of the Riksserien (renamed SDHL in 2015). She joined an impressive roster, which included players from the Swedish, Finnish, and Norwegian national teams, under the captaincy of Erika Grahm, with Emma Nordin and Johanna Olofsson serving as alternates. Miljone recorded 9 points (4+5) in 27 games during her rookie campaign, good for 11th in team scoring despite being the youngest regularly rostered player. Modo Hockey finished the regular season in first place and went on to the 2014 SDHL finals, where they settled for Swedish Championship silver medals after falling to Linköping HC Dam. Miljone followed up her rookie season with 12 points (4+8) in 32 games in her second season with Modo Hockey.

In the 2015–16 SDHL season Miljone left Modo to sign with Leksands IF Dam. She posted 5 goals and 5 assists (10 points) in 29 games. In 2016–17, Miljone scored 11 goals and 9 assists, her highest scoring SDHL season. Miljone was ranked second for scoring on Leksands IF with a total of 20 points. In the 2017–18 SDHL season, Miljone posted 8 goals and 8 assists in 30 games.

=== NCAA ===
For the 2018–19 season, Miljone moved from Sweden to Maine, United States of America to play with Maine Black Bears of the NCAA Division I Hockey East. Miljone recorded 12 points (3+9) in 27 games during her rookie campaign and scored her first collegiate goal in her second collegiate game. Miljone followed up her rookie season with 28 points (10+18) in 37 games in her second season with Maine Black Bears. Miljone was ranked third on Maine Black Bears with 10 goals, 89 shots, 43 blocked shots, and ranked second on the team with 18 assists. Maine Black Bears beat Boston University in quarterfinals in best-of-3 and played in Hockey East semifinals for the second time in Maine Black Bears history. In 2020–21 season, Miljone posted 1 goal and 2 assists, and was ranked fifth on team with 19 blocked shots in only 10 games. Maine Black Bears made it to Hockey East semifinals for the third time in Maine Black Bears history.

=== Liga Iberdrola ===
For the 2022–23 season, Miljone moved from United States of America to Jaca, Spain, to play with Club Hielo Jaca of the La Liga Nacional de Hockey Hielo femenina. During regular season Miljone recorded 32 goals and 12 assists in 12 games, followed up by an 8 game playoff performance of 8 goals and 10 assists. Totally Miljone tallied 62 points (40+22) in 20 games. CH Jaca went on to win La Liga Nacional de Hockey Hielo femenino league and became champions.

=== DEBL / IntHL ===
For 2023-24 season, Miljone moved from Spain to Villach, Austria, to play with Villach Lady Hawks of the Austrian Dameneishockey-Bundesliga (DEBL) and Slovenian Women's Hockey League (IntHL). During regular season in DEBL Miljone posted 39 goals and 27 assists in 16 games, followed by a 3 game playoff run recording 7 goals. Miljone finished the season as a point leader with 73 points (46+27) in 19 games. Villach Lady Hawks ended the season with a silver medals. In Slovenian Women's Hockey League (IntHL) Miljone recorded 17 goals and 14 assists in 5 games, followed by a 4 game playoff performance of 13 goals and 10 assists. Totally Miljone posted 54 points (30+24) in 9 game. Villach Lady Hawks finished the season in the first place.

In 2024-25 season, Miljone tallied 36 points (28+8) in 12 games while playing in DEBL and 39 points (29+10) in 6 games while playing in Slovenian Women's Hockey League (IntHL). She finished as a point leader and goal leader in both DEBL and IntHL. Villach Lady Hawks finished the season in the first place both in DEBL and IntHL. Miljone also played in Austrian Women's Hockey League (AWHL) qualification round, recording 6 goals and 5 assists in 3 games and leading in points.

In 2025-2026 season, Miljone posted 18 goals and 9 assists in total of 5 games in IntHL, while leading the league in goals. With her 27 points this season in IntHL, Miljone beat the all time total of the league in points, goals and assists. VSV Lady Hawks finished the season in the first place.

=== EWHL / AWHL ===
For 2025-26 season, Miljone was a part of VSV Lady Hawks, a newcomer team to European Women's Hockey League (EWHL) and Austrian Women's Hockey League (AWHL). During regular season in EWHL Miljone posted astonishing 19 goals and 24 assists (43 points) in 18 games, finishing the regular season in leading the EWHL league in goals, assists, and points. During the playoff round Miljone posted 5 points (2+3) in 2 games. After an impressive season in EWHL, Miljone was awarded with a place on the seasons All-Star Team.

She has also put up impressive numbers in AWHL with 12 goals and 12 assists in 9 games, leading in goals and points. VSV Lady Hawks, a team considered to be underdogs in the league have shown a prominent success in this league under the captaincy of Miljone.

== International play ==
Miljone first played in an IIHF tournament in 2013 when she joined the Latvian national team at the 2013 IIHF Women's World Championship Division I Group A in Stavanger, Norway. Remarkably making history with her mother Inese Geca-Miljone as first mother-daughter duo playing in an IIHF tournament. Miljone was named the best Latvian player of the game after scoring her first goal in the national team against Norway. The sixteen year old led Latvian national team with 4 points (3+1) in 5 games and was recognized as the best player of Latvian national team at the 2013 IIHF Women's World Championship Division I.

In 2014 IIHF Women's World Championship Division I Group B games in Ventspils, Latvia, Miljone posted with 3 goals and 3 assists in only 2 games, and was named the best Latvian player of the game against Hungary. Latvian national team finished the tournament with gold medals.

In 2015 IIHF Women's World Championship Division I Group A in Rouen, France, Miljone led Latvian national team with 3 points (2+1) in 5 games, and was named the best Latvian player of the game against Denmark.

In 2016 IIHF Women's World Championship Division I Group B in Asiago, Italy, Miljone posted 7 goals in 5 games. Miljone scored her first hat-trick in Latvian national team in only 9 minutes and 24 seconds in the tournaments first game against Kazakhstan, and was named the best Latvian player of the game. Miljone led the tournament with most goals and was named the best player of Latvian national team at the 2016 IIHF Women's World Championship Division I tournament. Latvian national team finished the tournament with silver medals.

Miljone had a career-high 10 point IIHF tournament in 2017 IIHF Women's World Championship Division I Group B in Katowice, Poland. Miljone posted her second career hat-trick in Latvian national team in the first game of the tournament, and was named the best Latvian player of the game against China. Miljone posted 5 goals and 5 assists in 5 games, earning the 2017 IIHF Women's World Championship Division I Group B best forward award. Latvian national team finished the tournament with bronze medals.

In 2018 IIHF Women's World Championship Division I Group B in Asiago, Italy, Miljone posted 2 goals and 2 assists in 5 games, and was named the best Latvian player of the game against China. Latvian national team finished the tournament with bronze medals.

In 2019 IIHF Women's World Championship Division I Group B games in Beijing, China, Miljone posted 1 goal in 4 games. Miljone was named the best Latvian player of the game against Netherlands.

In 2022 IIHF Women's World Championship Division II Group A games in Jaca, Spain, Miljone led Latvian national team with 7 points (5+2) in 4 games. She was named the best Latvian player of the game against Mexico and posted her third career hat-trick in Latvian national team in the game against Chinese Taipei. Miljone led the tournament with most goals (5) and most points (7), and was named the best player of Latvian national team and the best forward at the 2022 IIHF Women's World Championship Division II tournament. Latvian national team finished the tournament with silver medals.

Miljone had her second best career-high 9 point IIHF tournament in 2023 IIHF Women's World Championship Division II Group A in Mexico City, Mexico. Miljone posted 7 goals and 2 assists in 4 games, earning the 2023 IIHF Women's World Championship Division II Group A best forward award, and once again led the tournament with most goals (7) and most points (9). Latvian national team under the captaincy of Miljone finished the tournament with gold medals.

In 2024 IIHF Women's World Championship Division I Group B games in Riga, Latvia, Miljone led the tournament in goals, recording 7 points (4+3). She was named the best Latvian player of the game against Slovenia. For the second year in a row under the captaincy of Miljone, Latvian national team earned medals, finishing the tournament in second place.

In 2025 IIHF Women's World Championship Division I Group B games in Dumfries,Great Britain, Miljone led Latvian national team with 8 points (5+3), while co-leading the tournament in most goals. She was named the best player of Latvian national team in this tournament and the third year in a row under the captaincy of Miljone, Latvian national team earned medals, finishing the tournament in second place.

== Career statistics ==
=== Regular season and playoffs ===
				Regular season				Playoffs
Season	Team	League	Result	GP	G	A	Pts	GP	G	A	Pts
2009–2010	SHK Laima	OBWIC		-	17	15	32
2010–2011	SHK Laima	OBWIC		-	15	17	32
2011–2012	HS Rīga III	LBJČH U14	5th	8	13	20	33	14	9	12	21
2011–2012	HS Rīga	LBJČH U16	5th	3	0	0	0
2011–2012	SHK Laima	OBWIC	2nd place, silver medalist(s)	11	12	9	21
2012–2013	Women's National Team	LBJČH U16	8th	4	4	5	9	6	1	4	5
2012–2013	HS Rīga III	LBJČH U14	2nd place, silver medalist(s)	8	12	20	32	14	10	18	28
2012–2013	SHK Laima	OBWIC	1st place, gold medalist(s)	4	7	5	12
LBJČH U14 totals				16	25	40	65	28	19	30	49
LBJČH U16 totals				7	4	5	9	6	1	4	5
OBWIC totals				15*	51	46	97

* Some data is missing to provide a correct summary.

=== SDHL ===
				Regular season				Playoffs
Season	Team	League	Result	GP	G	A	Pts	GP	G	A	Pts
2013–2014	Modo Hockey	SDHL	2nd place, silver medalist(s)	27	4	5	9	3	0	0	0
2014–2015	Modo Hockey	SDHL	4th	27	4	7	11	5	0	1	1
2015–2016	Leksands IF	SDHL	5th	27	5	5	10	2	0	0	0
2016–2017	Leksands IF	SDHL	7th	33	11	9	20	2	0	0	0
2017–2018	Leksands IF	SDHL	6th	28	8	7	15	2	0	1	1
SDHL totals				142	32	33	65	14	0	2	2

=== NCAA ===
				Regular season				Playoffs
Season	Team	League	Result	GP	G	A	Pts	GP	G	A	Pts
2018–2019	Maine Black Bears	NCAA	9th	27	3	9	12
2019–2020	Maine Black Bears	NCAA	7th	34	10	18	28	3	0	0	0
2020–2021	Maine Black Bears	NCAA	7th	10	1	2	3
NCAA totals				71	14	29	43	3	0	0	0

=== LNHHF ===
				Regular season				Playoffs
Season	Team	League	Result	GP	G	A	Pts	GP	G	A	Pts
2022–2023	CH Jaca	LNHHF	1st place, gold medalist(s)	12	32	12	44	8	8	10	18
LNHHF totals				12	32	12	44	8	8	10	18

=== DEBL/IntHL ===
				Regular season				Playoffs
Season	Team	League	Result	GP	G	A	Pts	GP	G	A	Pts
2023–2024	Villach Lady Hawks	DEBL	2nd place, silver medalist(s)	16	39	27	66	3	7	0	7
2023–2024	Villach Lady Hawks	IntHL	1st place, gold medalist(s)	5	17	14	31	4	13	10	23
2024–2025	Villach Lady Hawks	DEBL	1st place, gold medalist(s)	12	28	8	36	4	6	10	16
2024–2025	Villach Lady Hawks	IntHL	1st place, gold medalist(s)	6	29	10	39
2024–2025	Villach Lady Hawks	AWHL	DNQ	3	6	5	11
2025–2026	VSV Lady Hawks	IntHL	1st place, gold medalist(s)	5	18	9	27
DEBL totals				28	67	35	102	7	13	10	23
IntHL totals				18	70	40	110	4	13	10	23

=== EWHL/AWHL ===
				Regular season				Playoffs
Season	Team	League	Result	GP	G	A	Pts	GP	G	A	Pts
2025-2026	VSV Lady Hawks	EWHL	7th	18	19	24	43	2	2	3	5
2025–2026	VSV Lady Hawks	AWHL		9	12	12	24
EWHL totals				18	19	24	43	2	2	3	5
AWHL totals				9	12	12	24

=== European Women's Champions Cup ===
Year	Team	Event	GP	G	A	Pts
2013	Laima Riga	EWCC	3	2	1	3

=== International ===
Year	Team	Event	Result	GP	G	A	Pts
2013	Latvia	WW D1A	6th	5	3	1	4
2014	Latvia	WW D1B	1st place, gold medalist(s)	3	3	3	6
2015	Latvia	WW D1A	6th	5	2	1	3
2016	Latvia	WW D1B	2nd place, silver medalist(s)	5	7	0	7
2016	Latvia	OGQ	DNQ	3	2	2	4
2017	Latvia	WW D1B	3rd place, bronze medalist(s)	5	5	5	10
2018	Latvia	WW D1B	3rd place, bronze medalist(s)	5	2	2	4
2019	Latvia	WW D1B	6th	4	1	0	1
2022	Latvia	WW D2A	2nd place, silver medalist(s)	4	5	2	7
2023	Latvia	WW D2A	1st place, gold medalist(s)	4	7	2	9
2024	Latvia	WW D1B	2nd place, silver medalist(s)	5	4	3	7
2024	Latvia	OGQ	DNQ	3	2	2	4
2025	Latvia	WW D1B	2nd place, silver medalist(s)	5	5	3	8
Senior totals				56	48	26	74

== Awards and honours ==
Award	Year
International
IIHF Women's World Championship Division IA – Best Latvian player of the game	2013, 2015
IIHF Women's World Championship Division IA – Top Player on Team	2013
IIHF Women's World Championship Division IB – Best Latvian player of the game	2014, 2016, 2017, 2018, 2019, 2024
IIHF Women's World Championship Division IB – Top Player on Team	2016, 2025
IIHF Women's World Championship Division IB – Best Forward	2017
IIHF Women's World Championship Division IB – Most Goals	2016, 2024, 2025
IIHF Women's World Championship Division IIA – Best Latvian player of the game	2022
IIHF Women's World Championship Division IIA – Top Player on Team	2022
IIHF Women's World Championship Division IIA – Best Forward	2022, 2023
IIHF Women's World Championship Division IIA – Most Goals	2022, 2023
IIHF Women's World Championship Division IIA – Most Points	2022, 2023

Award	Year
Regular season
LIHH La Liga Nacional de Hockey Hielo femenina – Most Goals	2023
LIHH La Liga Nacional de Hockey Hielo femenina – Most Assists	2023
LIHH La Liga Nacional de Hockey Hielo femenina – Most Points	2023
IntHL Slovenian Women's Hockey League – Most Goals Playoffs	2024
IntHL Slovenian Women's Hockey League – Most Points Playoffs	2024
IntHL Slovenian Women's Hockey League – Most Goals	2025, 2026
IntHL Slovenian Women's Hockey League – Most Assists	2025
IntHL Slovenian Women's Hockey League – Most Points	2025
DEBL Austrian Dameneishockey-Bundesliga – Most Goals	2025
DEBL Austrian Dameneishockey-Bundesliga – Most Points	2024, 2025
DEBL Austrian Dameneishockey-Bundesliga – Most Goals Playoffs	2024
DEBL Austrian Dameneishockey-Bundesliga – Most Assists Playoffs	2025
EWHL European Women's Hockey League – Most Goals	2026
EWHL European Women's Hockey League – Most Assists	2026
EWHL European Women's Hockey League – Most Points	2026
EWHL European Women's Hockey League – All-Star Team	2026
