= Evelina Nikolajeva =

Latvian ice hockey player

Evelina Nikolajeva (born 1998) is a Latvian ice hockey player. She is a member of the Laima Rīga team and the Latvia women's national ice hockey team.
