= 2023 IIHF Women's World Championship Division II =

International ice hockey tournament

Tournament details
- Host countries: Mexico; South Africa
- Venues: 2 (in 2 host cities)
- Dates: 2–7 April; 20–26 February
- Teams: 10

The 2023 IIHF Women's World Championship Division II consisted of two international ice hockey tournaments of the 2023 Women's Ice Hockey World Championships organized by the International Ice Hockey Federation (IIHF). Division II A and Division II B represent the fourth and fifth tier of the IIHF World Women's Championship.

Latvia won Group A and got promoted and North Korea got relegated after withdrawing. Belgium won the Group B tournament and got promoted, while Croatia got relegated.

== Group A tournament ==
2023 IIHF Women's World Championship Division II A

Tournament details
- Host country: Mexico
- City: Mexico City
- Venue: 1 (in 1 host city)
- Dates: 2–7 April
- Teams: 5

Tournament statistics
- Games played: 10
- Goals scored: 54 (5.4 per game)
- Attendance: 3,938 (394 per game)
- Scoring leader: (Latvia) Līga Miljone (9 points)

Official website
- www.iihf.com

The Division II Group A tournament was played in Mexico City, Mexico, from 2 to 7 April 2023.

=== Participating teams ===
| Team | Qualification |
|---|---|
| Latvia | Placed 2nd in Division II A last year. |
| Spain | Placed 3rd in Division II A last year. |
| Chinese Taipei | Placed 4th in Division II A last year. |
| Mexico | Hosts; placed 5th in Division II A last year. |
| ~~North Korea~~ | Did not participate last year. |
| Iceland | Placed 1st in Division II B last year and were promoted. |

=== Match officials ===
Three referees and five linesmen were selected for the tournament.

| Referees | Linesmen |
|---|---|
| (Canada) Grace Barlow; (Canada) Béatrice Fortin; (Czech Republic) Martina Zedníková | (Canada) Joanie Duchesneau; (Canada) Sophie Thomson; (Mexico) Marise Larios; (Poland) Monika Szpyt-Jucha; (Sweden) Jessica Lundgren |

=== Final standings ===
| Pos | Team | Pld | W | OTW | OTL | L | GF | GA | GD | Pts | Promotion or relegation |
|---|---|---|---|---|---|---|---|---|---|---|---|
| 1 | Latvia | 4 | 4 | 0 | 0 | 0 | 21 | 3 | +18 | 12 | Promoted to the 2024 Division I B |
| 2 | Spain | 4 | 3 | 0 | 0 | 1 | 17 | 6 | +11 | 9 | |
| 3 | Mexico (H) | 4 | 2 | 0 | 0 | 2 | 5 | 16 | −11 | 6 | |
| 4 | Chinese Taipei | 4 | 0 | 1 | 0 | 3 | 5 | 9 | −4 | 2 | |
| 5 | Iceland | 4 | 0 | 0 | 1 | 3 | 6 | 20 | −14 | 1 | |
| – | North Korea (Note: North Korea withdrew before the tournament.) | 0 | 0 | 0 | 0 | 0 | 0 | 0 | 0 | 0 | Relegated to the 2024 Division II B |

Source: IIHF
Rules for classification: 1) points; 2) head-to-head points; 3) head-to-head goal difference; 4) head-to-head number of goals scored; 5) result against closest best-ranked team outside tied teams; 6) result against second-best ranked team outside tied teams; 7) seeding before tournament.
(H) Host

=== Match results ===
All times are local (Central Zone – UTC−6).

| 2 April 2023; 14:00 | Latvia | 3–2 (0–1, 2–0, 1–1) | Chinese Taipei | San Jeronimo Arena, Mexico City; Attendance: 108 |

Game reference

Kristiāna Apsīte
Goalies
Hsu Tzu-ting
Referee:
(Canada) Grace Barlow
Linesmen:
(Mexico) Marise Larios
(Sweden) Jessica Lundgren

| | 0–1 | 06:33 – Yeh H. (Chao) (PP) |
| Rulle (A. Apsīte) – 21:28 | 1–1 |
| Miljone (Lagzdiņa) (PP) – 33:13 | 2–1 |
| | 2–2 | 44:10 – Hsieh C. (Huang M.) (PP) |
| Rulle – 58:53 | 3–2 |

35 min
Penalties
12 min
45
Shots
21

| 2 April 2023; 18:30 | Mexico | 0–6 (0–4, 0–1, 0–1) | Spain | San Jeronimo Arena, Mexico City; Attendance: 716 |

Game reference

Mónica Rentería
Miranda De Antuñano
Goalies
Alba Gonzalo
Laura López De Ochoa
Referee:
(Czech Republic) Martina Zedníková
Linesmen:
(Canada) Joanie Duchesneau
(Poland) Monika Szpyt-Jucha

| 0–1 | 04:11 – Serrano (Muñoz) |
| 0–2 | 10:42 – Muñoz (Serna, O'Hare) |
| 0–3 | 12:15 – Castellanos (Álvarez, Muñoz) (PP) |
| 0–4 | 16:29 – Castellanos (Bosch) |
| 0–5 | 39:28 – Scilipoti (Muñoz, Álvarez) (PP) |
| 0–6 | 42:35 – García (Rivas, Gil) |

10 min
Penalties
10 min
19
Shots
32

| 3 April 2023; 18:30 | Iceland | 2–3 (0–1, 1–1, 1–1) | Mexico | San Jeronimo Arena, Mexico City; Attendance: 682 |

Game reference

Birta Helgadóttir
Goalies
Mónica Rentería
Referee:
(Canada) Béatrice Fortin
Linesmen:
(Sweden) Jessica Lundgren
(Canada) Sophie Thomson

| | 0–1 | 10:25 – Téllez (G. Rojas, J. Rojas) |
| Vidarsdóttir – 27:15 | 1–1 |
| | 1–2 | 38:46 – Téllez (González) (SH) |
| | 1–3 | 44:52 – Amaya (PP) |
| Hjaltested (Björgvinsdóttir) (SH) – 52:42 | 2–3 |

14 min
Penalties
8 min
29
Shots
34

| 4 April 2023; 14:00 | Spain | 2–0 (0–0, 2–0, 0–0) | Chinese Taipei | San Jeronimo Arena, Mexico City; Attendance: 128 |

Game reference
| Alba Gonzalo | Goalies | Hsu Tzu-ting | Referee: (Canada) Grace Barlow; Linesmen: (Canada) Joanie Duchesneau (Mexico) Marise Larios |
| Pareja (Merino) – 29:35 / 1–0; Fernández (Aizpurua, Muñoz) – 32:31 / 2–0 | | | Referee: (Canada) Grace Barlow; Linesmen: (Canada) Joanie Duchesneau (Mexico) Marise Larios |
| 8 min | Penalties | 6 min | Referee: (Canada) Grace Barlow; Linesmen: (Canada) Joanie Duchesneau (Mexico) Marise Larios |
| 41 | Shots | 20 | Referee: (Canada) Grace Barlow; Linesmen: (Canada) Joanie Duchesneau (Mexico) Marise Larios |

| 4 April 2023; 18:30 | Iceland | 0–6 (0–3, 0–1, 0–2) | Latvia | San Jeronimo Arena, Mexico City; Attendance: 127 |

Game reference

Birta Helgadóttir
Andrea Bachmann
Goalies
Kristiāna Apsīte
Referee:
(Canada) Béatrice Fortin
Linesmen:
(Poland) Monika Szpyt-Jucha
(Canada) Sophie Thomson

| 0–1 | 00:17 – Miljone (A. Apsīte, Rulle) |
| 0–2 | 05:58 – Lagzdiņa (Rulle, K. Apsīte) (PP) |
| 0–3 | 12:55 – Lagzdiņa (Yip-Chuck) (PP) |
| 0–4 | 30:34 – Yip-Chuck (A. Apsīte) (SH) |
| 0–5 | 46:38 – Miljone (Kolīte) (PP) |
| 0–6 | 50:46 – Balode (Miljone) (PP2) |

14 min
Penalties
18 min
21
Shots
35

| 5 April 2023; 18:30 | Mexico | 0–8 (0–1, 0–4, 0–3) | Latvia | San Jeronimo Arena, Mexico City; Attendance: 708 |

Game reference

Mónica Rentería
Miranda De Antuñano
Goalies
Kristiāna Apsīte
Referee:
(Czech Republic) Martina Zedníková
Linesmen:
(Sweden) Jessica Lundgren
(Canada) Sophie Thomson

| 0–1 | 18:35 – Rulle (Yip-Chuck) (PP) |
| 0–2 | 21:50 – Pudule (Aņisimova) |
| 0–3 | 25:20 – Miljone (Yip-Chuck) |
| 0–4 | 29:42 – Yip-Chuck (Aņisimova) (EA) |
| 0–5 | 36:25 – A. Apsīte (Jakovļeva) |
| 0–6 | 43:45 – Miljone (Rulle) (PP2) |
| 0–7 | 49:44 – Kezika (A. Apsīte) |
| 0–8 | 59:13 – Rulle (Lagzdiņa) (PP) |

16 min
Penalties
12 min
23
Shots
42

| 6 April 2023; 14:00 | Spain | 8–2 (1–1, 3–0, 4–1) | Iceland | San Jeronimo Arena, Mexico City; Attendance: 114 |

Game reference

Alba Gonzalo
Goalies
Birta Helgadóttir
Andrea Bachmann
Referee:
(Czech Republic) Martina Zedníková
Linesmen:
(Canada) Joanie Duchesneau
(Mexico) Marise Larios

| Muñoz (Fernández, Álvarez) – 10:18 | 1–0 |
| | 1–1 | 10:39 – Björgvinsdóttir |
| Serrano (Merino) – 26:59 | 2–1 |
| Castellanos (Scilipoti) – 33:19 | 3–1 |
| Merino (Merino) – 35:58 | 4–1 |
| | 4–2 | 43:00 – Geirsdóttir |
| Fernández (Muñoz, O'Hare) – 46:08 | 5–2 |
| Fernández (O'Hare) (PP) – 46:56 | 6–2 |
| Scilipoti (Moreno) – 54:39 | 7–2 |
| Serna (O'Hare) – 56:32 | 8–2 |

10 min
Penalties
8 min
45
Shots
16

| 6 April 2023; 18:30 | Chinese Taipei | 0–2 (0–1, 0–1, 0–0) | Mexico | San Jeronimo Arena, Mexico City; Attendance: 782 |

Game reference
| Wang Yun-tzu | Goalies | Mónica Rentería | Referee: (Canada) Béatrice Fortin; Linesmen: (Sweden) Jessica Lundgren (Poland) Monika Szpyt-Jucha |
| 0–1 / 07:57 – D. Rosales (Téllez); 0–2 / 33:09 – Nevárez (SH) | | | Referee: (Canada) Béatrice Fortin; Linesmen: (Sweden) Jessica Lundgren (Poland) Monika Szpyt-Jucha |
| 0 min | Penalties | 12 min | Referee: (Canada) Béatrice Fortin; Linesmen: (Sweden) Jessica Lundgren (Poland) Monika Szpyt-Jucha |
| 39 | Shots | 27 | Referee: (Canada) Béatrice Fortin; Linesmen: (Sweden) Jessica Lundgren (Poland) Monika Szpyt-Jucha |

| 7 April 2023; 14:00 | Latvia | 4–1 (1–0, 1–0, 2–1) | Spain | San Jeronimo Arena, Mexico City; Attendance: 295 |

Game reference

Kristiāna Apsīte
Goalies
Alba Gonzalo
Referee:
(Canada) Grace Barlow
Linesmen:
(Sweden) Jessica Lundgren
(Canada) Sophie Thomson

| Miljone (Balode) – 15:54 | 1–0 |
| Miljone (Lagzdiņa) – 21:17 | 2–0 |
| Silajāne (A. Apsīte, Kubliņa) (PP) – 45:11 | 3–0 |
| | 3–1 | 48:46 – Muñoz (Pareja) |
| Balode (Yip-Chuck, Miljone) (PP) – 49:12 | 4–1 |

8 min
Penalties
10 min
27
Shots
38

| 7 April 2023; 18:30 | Chinese Taipei | 3–2 GWS (1–2, 1–0, 0–0) (OT: 0–0) (SO: 1–0) | Iceland | San Jeronimo Arena, Mexico City; Attendance: 278 |

Game reference

Hsu Tzu-ting
Goalies
Birta Helgadóttir
Referee:
(Czech Republic) Martina Zedníková
Linesmen:
(Mexico) Marise Larios
(Poland) Monika Szpyt-Jucha

| | 0–1 | 05:51 – Björgvinsdóttir (Hjaltested) |
| Lin Yi. (Sha) – 18:24 | 1–1 |
| | 1–2 | 19:19 – Leifsdóttir |
| Hsieh C. (Huang Y.) – 26:33 | 2–2 |

Chao (miss)
Huang Y.
Lin Yi. (miss)
Pan (miss)
Shootout
(miss) Björgvinsdóttir
(miss) Hjaltested
(miss) Björnsdóttir
(miss) Arnadóttir
(miss) Leifsdóttir
8 min
Penalties
39 min
42
Shots
24

=== Statistics ===
==== Scoring leaders ====
List shows the top skaters sorted by points, then goals.

| Player | GP | G | A | Pts | +/− | PIM | POS |
|---|---|---|---|---|---|---|---|
| (Latvia) Līga Miljone | 4 | 7 | 2 | 9 | +5 | 4 | F |
| (Spain) Vega Muñoz | 4 | 3 | 5 | 8 | +6 | 0 | F |
| (Latvia) Linda Rulle | 4 | 4 | 3 | 7 | +4 | 0 | F |
| (Latvia) Krista Yip-Chuck | 4 | 2 | 4 | 6 | +2 | 4 | F |
| (Latvia) Agnese Apsīte | 4 | 1 | 5 | 6 | +7 | 0 | F |
| (Latvia) Anna Lagzdiņa | 4 | 2 | 3 | 5 | +2 | 0 | F |
| (Spain) Haizea Fernández | 4 | 3 | 1 | 4 | +5 | 0 | F |
| (Spain) Bridget O'Hare | 4 | 0 | 4 | 4 | +6 | 4 | D |
| (Spain) Claudia Castellanos | 4 | 3 | 0 | 3 | +2 | 6 | F |
| (Latvia) Aija Balode | 4 | 2 | 1 | 3 | +5 | 2 | D |
| (Iceland) Sunna Björgvinsdóttir | 4 | 2 | 1 | 3 | +3 | 2 | F |
| (Spain) Sofia Scilipoti | 4 | 2 | 1 | 3 | +2 | 6 | F |
| (Mexico) Claudia Téllez | 4 | 2 | 1 | 3 | +1 | 2 | F |

GP = Games played; G = Goals; A = Assists; Pts = Points; +/− = Plus/Minus; PIM = Penalties in Minutes; POS = Position
Source: IIHF.com

==== Goaltending leaders ====
Only the top five goaltenders, based on save percentage, who have played at least 40% of their team's minutes, are included in this list.

| Player | TOI | GA | GAA | SA | Sv% | SO |
|---|---|---|---|---|---|---|
| (Latvia) Kristiāna Apsīte | 240:00 | 3 | 0.75 | 102 | 97.06 | 2 |
| (Chinese Taipei) Hsu Tzu-ting | 185:00 | 7 | 2.27 | 110 | 93.64 | 0 |
| (Spain) Alba Gonzalo | 217:28 | 6 | 1.66 | 77 | 92.21 | 1 |
| (Iceland) Birta Helgadóttir | 181:55 | 12 | 3.96 | 122 | 90.16 | 0 |
| (Mexico) Mónica Rentería | 190:37 | 11 | 3.46 | 103 | 89.32 | 1 |

TOI = time on ice (minutes:seconds); SA = shots against; GA = goals against; GAA = goals against average; Sv% = save percentage; SO = shutouts
Source: IIHF.com

=== Awards ===
| Position | Player |
|---|---|
| Goaltender | (Mexico) Mónica Rentería |
| Defenceman | (Latvia) Aija Balode |
| Forward | (Latvia) Līga Miljone |

== Group B tournament ==
2023 IIHF Women's World Championship Division II B

Tournament details
- Host country: South Africa
- City: Cape Town
- Venue: 1 (in 1 host city)
- Dates: 20–26 February
- Teams: 5

Tournament statistics
- Games played: 10
- Goals scored: 84 (8.4 per game)
- Attendance: 1,900 (190 per game)
- Scoring leader: (Australia) Sharna Godfrey (14 points)

Official website
- www.iihf.com

The Division II Group B tournament was played in Cape Town, South Africa, from 20 to 26 February 2023.

=== Participating teams ===
| Team | Qualification |
|---|---|
| Australia | Placed 2nd in Division II B last year. |
| ~~Turkey~~ | Placed 3rd in Division II B last year. |
| South Africa | Hosts; placed 4th in Division II B last year. |
| Croatia | Placed 5th in Division II B last year. |
| New Zealand | Did not participate last year. |
| Belgium | Placed 1st in Division III A last year and were promoted. |

=== Match officials ===
Three referees and five linesmen were selected for the tournament.

| Referees | Linesmen |
|---|---|
| (Australia) Davida Paul; (Czech Republic) Gabriela Malá; (Germany) Svenja Strohmenger | (Hungary) Bernadett Holzer; (Italy) Danielle Rostan; (Poland) Joanna Pobożniak; (Spain) Alba Calero; (Switzerland) Michele Müller |

=== Final standings ===
| Pos | Team | Pld | W | OTW | OTL | L | GF | GA | GD | Pts | Promotion or relegation |
|---|---|---|---|---|---|---|---|---|---|---|---|
| 1 | Belgium | 4 | 4 | 0 | 0 | 0 | 19 | 4 | +15 | 12 | Promoted to the 2024 Division II A |
| 2 | Australia | 4 | 3 | 0 | 0 | 1 | 34 | 3 | +31 | 9 | |
| 3 | New Zealand | 4 | 2 | 0 | 0 | 2 | 24 | 11 | +13 | 6 | |
| 4 | South Africa (H) | 4 | 1 | 0 | 0 | 3 | 4 | 20 | −16 | 3 | |
| 5 | Croatia | 4 | 0 | 0 | 0 | 4 | 3 | 46 | −43 | 0 | Relegated to the 2024 Division III A |
| – | Turkey (Note: Turkey withdrew before the tournament due to the 2023 Turkey–Syria earthquake.) | 0 | 0 | 0 | 0 | 0 | 0 | 0 | 0 | 0 | Withdrawn |

Source: IIHF
Rules for classification: 1) points; 2) head-to-head points; 3) head-to-head goal difference; 4) head-to-head number of goals scored; 5) result against closest best-ranked team outside tied teams; 6) result against second-best ranked team outside tied teams; 7) seeding before tournament.
(H) Host

=== Match results ===
All times are local (South African Standard Time – UTC+2).

| 20 February 2023; 16:00 | Croatia | 1–15 (1–4, 0–3, 0–8) | New Zealand | The Ice Station, Cape Town; Attendance: 30 |

Game reference

Julija Baždar
Lucija Pretula
Goalies
Lochlyn Hyde
Referee:
(Australia) Davida Paul
Linesmen:
(Spain) Alba Calero
(Hungary) Bernadett Holzer

| | 0–1 | 02:32 – C. Heale (Lilly) (PP) |
| | 0–2 | 03:55 – Mills (Heale, Kloss) |
| Matak (Marinković, E. Čavka) (PP) – 06:11 | 1–2 |
| | 1–3 | 14:38 – Lilly (C. Heale) (PP) |
| | 1–4 | 15:38 – Kloss (Mulari) |
| | 1–5 | 25:13 – Shields (A. Heale, Mulari) (PP) |
| | 1–6 | 31:53 – Murray (Lilly, Whitman) |
| | 1–7 | 39:26 – C. Heale (Shields) |
| | 1–8 | 41:25 – C. Heale |
| | 1–9 | 49:47 – Mulari (Kloss, Richmond) |
| | 1–10 | 53:00 – Mills (Mulari) |
| | 1–11 | 53:54 – Murray |
| | 1–12 | 57:19 – Jones (Mulari) |
| | 1–13 | 59:16 – A. Heale (C. Heale, Whitman) |
| | 1–14 | 59:44 – Kloss (Mulari, Mills) |
| | 1–15 | 59:58 – Mills (Mulari) |

10 min
Penalties
6 min
14
Shots
61

| 20 February 2023; 20:00 | Australia | 10–0 (2–0, 5–0, 3–0) | South Africa | The Ice Station, Cape Town; Attendance: 300 |

Game reference

Sasha King
Goalies
Shaylene Rorke
Monique van Dyk
Referee:
(Czech Republic) Gabriela Malá
Linesmen:
(Poland) Joanna Pobożniak
(Italy) Danielle Rostan

| Godfrey (Kiliwnik) – 01:02 | 1–0 |
| Aparicio (Clark-Crompton, Cochrane) – 11:25 | 2–0 |
| Sammons (Godfrey, Goonan) – 27:15 | 3–0 |
| Badaoui (Lukowiak) – 29:45 | 4–0 |
| Clark-Crompton – 33:39 | 5–0 |
| Godfrey (Sammons, Kiliwnik) – 35:34 | 6–0 |
| Aparicio (Clark-Crompton, Cochrane) – 36:34 | 7–0 |
| Nottle (Pullen, Walker) – 48:31 | 8–0 |
| Clark-Crumpton (Aparicio) – 56:34 | 9–0 |
| Kiliwnik (Godfrey, Sammons) – 58:55 | 10–0 |

16 min
Penalties
10 min
46
Shots
3

| 21 February 2023; 20:00 | Belgium | 10–1 (3–0, 3–1, 4–0) | Croatia | The Ice Station, Cape Town; Attendance: 50 |

Game reference

Nina van Orshaegen
Charlotte Swinnen
Goalies
Julija Baždar
Referee:
(Germany) Svenja Strohmenger
Linesmen:
(Hungary) Bernadett Holzer
(Switzerland) Michele Müller

| De Guchtenaere (Van Calster) (PP) – 05:41 | 1–0 |
| Steeno (De Guchtenaere) – 13:46 | 2–0 |
| De Guchtenaere (Steeno) – 19:13 | 3–0 |
| De Guchtenaere (Van Calster, Steeno) – 28:35 | 4–0 |
| Paulissen – 28:41 | 5–0 |
| Van Calster – 31:37 | 6–0 |
| | 6–1 | 34:32 – E. Čavka (Marinković, Pack) |
| Paulissen (De Wolf) – 49:52 | 7–1 |
| De Guchtenaere (Steeno) (SH) – 52:02 | 8–1 |
| Maka (Azitemina) – 54:18 | 9–1 |
| Terwangne (Van Calster) – 55:01 | 10–1 |

10 min
Penalties
4 min
48
Shots
13

| 22 February 2023; 16:00 | Belgium | 1–0 (0–0, 1–0, 0–0) | Australia | The Ice Station, Cape Town; Attendance: 50 |

Game reference
| Nina van Orshaegen | Goalies | Imogen Perry | Referee: (Germany) Svenja Strohmenger; Linesmen: (Switzerland) Michele Müller (Poland) Joanna Pobożniak |
| Bosmans (Van Calster, Steeno) (PP) – 25:21 / 1–0 | | | Referee: (Germany) Svenja Strohmenger; Linesmen: (Switzerland) Michele Müller (Poland) Joanna Pobożniak |
| 10 min | Penalties | 10 min | Referee: (Germany) Svenja Strohmenger; Linesmen: (Switzerland) Michele Müller (Poland) Joanna Pobożniak |
| 12 | Shots | 48 | Referee: (Germany) Svenja Strohmenger; Linesmen: (Switzerland) Michele Müller (Poland) Joanna Pobożniak |

| 22 February 2023; 20:00 | New Zealand | 5–1 (2–0, 1–0, 2–1) | South Africa | The Ice Station, Cape Town; Attendance: 300 |

Game reference

Lilly Forbes
Goalies
Shaylene Rorke
Referee:
(Australia) Davida Paul
Linesmen:
(Spain) Alba Calero
(Italy) Danielle Rostan

| Mills (Kloss) – 13:58 | 1–0 |
| Orr (Murray) – 14:43 | 2–0 |
| Murray (Mulari) (PP) – 33:56 | 3–0 |
| Jones – 46:34 | 4–0 |
| Mulari (Kloss) – 47:51 | 5–0 |
| | 5–1 | 54:26 – Van Doesburgh (Verwey) (PP2) |

6 min
Penalties
6 min
49
Shots
12

| 23 February 2023; 20:00 | Croatia | 0–19 (0–2, 0–12, 0–5) | Australia | The Ice Station, Cape Town; Attendance: 30 |

Game reference

Julija Baždar
Lucija Pretula
Goalies
Sasha King
Referee:
(Czech Republic) Gabriela Malá
Linesmen:
(Hungary) Bernadett Holzer
(Italy) Danielle Rostan

| 0–1 | 00:47 – Godfrey (Sammons, Harvey) |
| 0–2 | 11:59 – Cochrane (Malcolm, Aparicio) (PP) |
| 0–3 | 20:29 – Aparicio (Clark-Crumpton) |
| 0–4 | 21:37 – Kiliwnik (Godfrey, Walker) |
| 0–5 | 23:01 – Godfrey (Sammons, Kiliwnik) (PP) |
| 0–6 | 23:22 – Cochrane |
| 0–7 | 25:28 – Walker (Malcolm) |
| 0–8 | 26:20 – Kiliwnik (Godfrey, Sammons) |
| 0–9 | 27:22 – Clark-Crumpton (Cochrane) |
| 0–10 | 28:56 – Malcolm (Tihema) |
| 0–11 | 29:42 – Clark-Crumpton (Aparicio) |
| 0–12 | 33:48 – Kiliwnik (Sammons, Dutton) |
| 0–13 | 34:43 – Cochrane (Clark-Crumpton, Walker) |
| 0–14 | 38:42 – Walker (Godfrey) |
| 0–15 | 42:23 – Clark-Crumpton (Godfrey) |
| 0–16 | 49:11 – Nottle (Badaoui, Harvey) |
| 0–17 | 50:11 – Sammons (Rapchuk) |
| 0–18 | 59:35 – Godfrey (Kiliwnik, Sammons) |
| 0–19 | 59:50 – Kiliwnik (Godfrey) |

6 min
Penalties
6 min
8
Shots
67

| 24 February 2023; 16:00 | New Zealand | 2–4 (2–1, 0–2, 0–1) | Belgium | The Ice Station, Cape Town; Attendance: 40 |

Game reference

Lochlyn Hyde
Goalies
Nina van Orshaegen
Referee:
(Germany) Svenja Strohmenger
Linesmen:
(Spain) Alba Calero
(Poland) Joanna Pobożniak

| | 0–1 | 00:41 – De Guchtenaere (Bosmans, Steeno) |
| Lilly – 05:06 | 1–1 |
| Mills (Mulari, Jones) – 18:02 | 2–1 |
| | 2–2 | 23:58 – De Guchtenaere (Steeno, Van Calster) |
| | 2–3 | 28:48 – De Guchtenaere (Steeno, Bosmans) |
| | 2–4 | 59:23 – De Guchtenaere (Steeno) (EN) |

6 min
Penalties
2 min
27
Shots
19

| 24 February 2023; 20:00 | South Africa | 2–1 (2–0, 0–1, 0–0) | Croatia | The Ice Station, Cape Town; Attendance: 200 |

Game reference

Shaylene Rorke
Goalies
Julija Baždar
Referee:
(Australia) Davida Paul
Linesmen:
(Switzerland) Michele Müller
(Italy) Danielle Rostan

| Rhode (SH) – 07:01 | 1–0 |
| Kruger – 19:55 | 2–0 |
| | 2–1 | 39:08 – E. Čavka |

14 min
Penalties
20 min
25
Shots
13

| 26 February 2023; 14:00 | Australia | 5–2 (0–2, 3–0, 2–0) | New Zealand | The Ice Station, Cape Town; Attendance: 300 |

Game reference

Imogen Perry
Sasha King
Goalies
Lilly Forbes
Referee:
(Germany) Svenja Strohmenger
Linesmen:
(Switzerland) Michele Müller
(Poland) Joanna Pobożniak

| | 0–1 | 02:37 – Whitman (A. Heale) |
| | 0–2 | 17:43 – Murray (Orr) |
| Godfrey (Sammons, Kiliwnik) – 25:38 | 1–2 |
| Clark-Crumpton (Cochrane, Aparicio) – 31:25 | 2–2 |
| Clark-Crumpton – 37:23 | 3–2 |
| Sammons (Godfrey, Dutton) – 44:24 | 4–2 |
| Clark-Crumpton (Aparicio, Malcolm) (PP) – 51:18 | 5–2 |

4 min
Penalties
6 min
45
Shots
16

| 26 February 2023; 18:00 | South Africa | 1–4 (0–1, 1–2, 0–1) | Belgium | The Ice Station, Cape Town; Attendance: 600 |

Game reference

Shaylene Rorke
Monique van Dyk
Goalies
Nina van Orshaegen
Charlotte Swinnen
Referee:
(Czech Republic) Gabriela Malá
Linesmen:
(Spain) Alba Calero
(Hungary) Bernadett Holzer

| | 0–1 | 14:33 – Steeno (Van Calster, De Guchtenaere) (PP) |
| | 0–2 | 30:15 – De Wolf (Leyen, Paulissen) |
| | 0–3 | 33:14 – Van Calster (Steeno, Bosmans) |
| Rhode (Kruger, Van Doesburgh) (PP) – 38:44 | 1–3 |
| | 1–4 | 45:17 – Paulissen (De Wolf) |

6 min
Penalties
2 min
5
Shots
47

=== Statistics ===
==== Scoring leaders ====
List shows the top skaters sorted by points, then goals.

| Player | GP | G | A | Pts | +/− | PIM | POS |
|---|---|---|---|---|---|---|---|
| (Australia) Sharna Godfrey | 4 | 6 | 8 | 14 | +14 | 2 | F |
| (Australia) Michelle Clark-Crompton | 4 | 8 | 4 | 12 | +12 | 2 | F |
| (Australia) Sara Sammons | 4 | 3 | 8 | 11 | +13 | 0 | F |
| (New Zealand) Anjali Mulari | 4 | 2 | 9 | 11 | +8 | 0 | F |
| (Belgium) Anke Steeno | 4 | 2 | 9 | 11 | +8 | 8 | F |
| (Belgium) Lotte De Guchtenaere | 4 | 8 | 2 | 10 | +9 | 0 | F |
| (Australia) Lindsey Kiliwnik | 4 | 5 | 5 | 10 | +13 | 0 | F |
| (Australia) Ashlie Aparicio | 4 | 3 | 5 | 8 | +11 | 2 | F |
| (Belgium) Chinouk Van Calster | 4 | 2 | 6 | 8 | +9 | 0 | D |
| (Australia) Stephenie Cochrane | 4 | 3 | 4 | 7 | +11 | 0 | F |

GP = Games played; G = Goals; A = Assists; Pts = Points; +/− = Plus/Minus; PIM = Penalties in Minutes; POS = Position
Source: IIHF.com

==== Goaltending leaders ====
Only the top five goaltenders, based on save percentage, who have played at least 40% of their team's minutes, are included in this list.

| Player | TOI | GA | GAA | SA | Sv% | SO |
|---|---|---|---|---|---|---|
| (Australia) Sasha King | 160:00 | 0 | 0.00 | 20 | 100.00 | 2 |
| (Belgium) Nina van Orshaegen | 180:00 | 3 | 1.00 | 86 | 96.51 | 1 |
| (New Zealand) Lilly Forbes | 120:00 | 6 | 2.00 | 57 | 89.47 | 0 |
| (New Zealand) Lochlyn Hyde | 118:44 | 4 | 2.02 | 32 | 87.50 | 0 |
| (South Africa) Shaylene Rorke | 190:28 | 16 | 5.04 | 119 | 86.55 | 0 |

TOI = time on ice (minutes:seconds); SA = shots against; GA = goals against; GAA = goals against average; Sv% = save percentage; SO = shutouts
Source: IIHF.com

=== Awards ===
| Position | Player |
|---|---|
| Goaltender | (Belgium) Nina van Orshaegen |
| Defenceman | (South Africa) Donne van Doesburgh |
| Forward | (Belgium) Lotte De Guchtenaere |
