= 2023 Women's Ice Hockey World Championships =

24th Women's World Ice Hockey Championships

Tournament details
- Host countries: Canada; China; South Korea; Mexico; South Africa; Romania; Israel

Final positions
- Champions: United States (10th title)
- Runners-up: Canada
- Third place: Czechia
- Fourth place: Switzerland

The 2023 Women's Ice Hockey World Championships were the 26th such series of tournaments organized by the International Ice Hockey Federation. Teams participated at several levels of competition. These tournaments also served as qualifications for the 2024 competition.

As in 2022, teams from Russia and Belarus were not allowed to enter, as they were suspended by the IIHF due to the countries' invasion of Ukraine.

== Championship (Top Division) ==
The Top Division tournament was played in Brampton, Canada, from 5 to 16 April 2023.

| Pos | Grp | Team | Pld | W | OTW | OTL | L | GF | GA | GD | Pts | Final result |
|---|---|---|---|---|---|---|---|---|---|---|---|---|
| 1 | A | United States | 7 | 6 | 0 | 1 | 0 | 43 | 12 | +31 | 19 | Champions |
| 2 | A | Canada (H) | 7 | 4 | 2 | 0 | 1 | 29 | 13 | +16 | 16 | Runners-up |
| 3 | A | Czechia | 7 | 3 | 1 | 0 | 3 | 16 | 26 | −10 | 11 | Third place |
| 4 | A | Switzerland | 7 | 2 | 0 | 0 | 5 | 15 | 30 | −15 | 6 | Fourth place |
| 5 | B | Finland | 7 | 6 | 0 | 0 | 1 | 38 | 8 | +30 | 18 | Fifth place game |
| 6 | B | Sweden | 7 | 3 | 0 | 1 | 3 | 22 | 20 | +2 | 10 | Fifth place game |
| 7 | A | Japan | 6 | 0 | 0 | 1 | 5 | 6 | 24 | −18 | 1 | |
| 8 | B | Germany | 6 | 3 | 0 | 0 | 3 | 13 | 17 | −4 | 9 | |
| 9 | B | Hungary | 4 | 1 | 0 | 0 | 3 | 7 | 15 | −8 | 3 | Eliminated in Preliminary round and relegated to the 2024 Division I A |
| 10 | B | France | 4 | 0 | 0 | 0 | 4 | 5 | 29 | −24 | 0 | Eliminated in Preliminary round and relegated to the 2024 Division I A |

Source: IIHF
Rules for classification: 1) tier of the group; 2) position in the group; 3) number of points; 4) goal difference; 5) goals scored; 6) seeding before tournament.
(H) Host

== Division I ==
=== Group A ===
The Division I Group A tournament was scheduled to be held in Shenzhen, China, from 11 to 17 April 2023, but in March 2023, it was postponed. On 22 March, it was rescheduled and was played from 20 to 26 August 2023.

| Pos | Team | Pld | W | OTW | OTL | L | GF | GA | GD | Pts | Promotion or relegation |
|---|---|---|---|---|---|---|---|---|---|---|---|
| 1 | China (H) | 5 | 5 | 0 | 0 | 0 | 14 | 6 | +8 | 15 | Promoted to the 2024 Top Division |
| 2 | Denmark | 5 | 3 | 0 | 0 | 2 | 14 | 8 | +6 | 9 (Note: Denmark 3 points, +4 GD; Austria 3 points, 0 GD; Netherlands 3 points, −4 GD.) | Promoted to the 2024 Top Division |
| 3 | Austria | 5 | 3 | 0 | 0 | 2 | 8 | 5 | +3 | 9 | |
| 4 | Netherlands | 5 | 3 | 0 | 0 | 2 | 13 | 12 | +1 | 9 | |
| 5 | Norway | 5 | 1 | 0 | 0 | 4 | 11 | 21 | −10 | 3 | |
| 6 | Slovakia | 5 | 0 | 0 | 0 | 5 | 4 | 12 | −8 | 0 | Relegated to the 2024 Division I B |

Source: IIHF
Rules for classification: 1) points; 2) head-to-head points; 3) head-to-head goal difference; 4) head-to-head number of goals scored; 5) result against closest best-ranked team outside tied teams; 6) result against second-best ranked team outside tied teams; 7) seeding before tournament.
(H) Host

=== Group B ===
The Division I Group B tournament was played in Suwon, South Korea, from 17 to 23 April 2023.

| Pos | Team | Pld | W | OTW | OTL | L | GF | GA | GD | Pts | Promotion or relegation |
|---|---|---|---|---|---|---|---|---|---|---|---|
| 1 | South Korea (H) | 5 | 4 | 1 | 0 | 0 | 15 | 6 | +9 | 14 | Promoted to the 2024 Division I A |
| 2 | Poland | 5 | 4 | 0 | 0 | 1 | 8 | 7 | +1 | 12 | |
| 3 | Italy | 5 | 3 | 0 | 1 | 1 | 10 | 5 | +5 | 10 | |
| 4 | Slovenia | 5 | 1 | 1 | 0 | 3 | 10 | 14 | −4 | 5 | |
| 5 | Great Britain | 5 | 1 | 0 | 1 | 3 | 7 | 11 | −4 | 4 | |
| 6 | Kazakhstan | 5 | 0 | 0 | 0 | 5 | 4 | 11 | −7 | 0 | Relegated to the 2024 Division II A |

Source: IIHF
Rules for classification: 1) points; 2) head-to-head points; 3) head-to-head goal difference; 4) head-to-head number of goals scored; 5) result against closest best-ranked team outside tied teams; 6) result against second-best ranked team outside tied teams; 7) seeding before tournament.
(H) Host

== Division II ==
=== Group A ===
The Division II Group A tournament was played in Mexico City, Mexico, from 2 to 7 April 2023.

| Pos | Team | Pld | W | OTW | OTL | L | GF | GA | GD | Pts | Promotion or relegation |
|---|---|---|---|---|---|---|---|---|---|---|---|
| 1 | Latvia | 4 | 4 | 0 | 0 | 0 | 21 | 3 | +18 | 12 | Promoted to the 2024 Division I B |
| 2 | Spain | 4 | 3 | 0 | 0 | 1 | 17 | 6 | +11 | 9 | |
| 3 | Mexico (H) | 4 | 2 | 0 | 0 | 2 | 5 | 16 | −11 | 6 | |
| 4 | Chinese Taipei | 4 | 0 | 1 | 0 | 3 | 5 | 9 | −4 | 2 | |
| 5 | Iceland | 4 | 0 | 0 | 1 | 3 | 6 | 20 | −14 | 1 | |
| – | North Korea (Note: North Korea withdrew before the tournament.) | 0 | 0 | 0 | 0 | 0 | 0 | 0 | 0 | 0 | Relegated to the 2024 Division II B |

Source: IIHF
Rules for classification: 1) points; 2) head-to-head points; 3) head-to-head goal difference; 4) head-to-head number of goals scored; 5) result against closest best-ranked team outside tied teams; 6) result against second-best ranked team outside tied teams; 7) seeding before tournament.
(H) Host

=== Group B ===
The Division II Group B tournament was played in Cape Town, South Africa, from 20 to 26 February 2023.

| Pos | Team | Pld | W | OTW | OTL | L | GF | GA | GD | Pts | Promotion or relegation |
|---|---|---|---|---|---|---|---|---|---|---|---|
| 1 | Belgium | 4 | 4 | 0 | 0 | 0 | 19 | 4 | +15 | 12 | Promoted to the 2024 Division II A |
| 2 | Australia | 4 | 3 | 0 | 0 | 1 | 34 | 3 | +31 | 9 | |
| 3 | New Zealand | 4 | 2 | 0 | 0 | 2 | 24 | 11 | +13 | 6 | |
| 4 | South Africa (H) | 4 | 1 | 0 | 0 | 3 | 4 | 20 | −16 | 3 | |
| 5 | Croatia | 4 | 0 | 0 | 0 | 4 | 3 | 46 | −43 | 0 | Relegated to the 2024 Division III A |
| – | Turkey (Note: Turkey withdrew before the tournament due to the 2023 Turkey–Syria earthquake.) | 0 | 0 | 0 | 0 | 0 | 0 | 0 | 0 | 0 | Withdrawn |

Source: IIHF
Rules for classification: 1) points; 2) head-to-head points; 3) head-to-head goal difference; 4) head-to-head number of goals scored; 5) result against closest best-ranked team outside tied teams; 6) result against second-best ranked team outside tied teams; 7) seeding before tournament.
(H) Host

== Division III ==
=== Group A ===
The Division III Group A tournament was played in Brașov, Romania, from 3 to 9 April 2023.

| Pos | Team | Pld | W | OTW | OTL | L | GF | GA | GD | Pts | Promotion or relegation |
|---|---|---|---|---|---|---|---|---|---|---|---|
| 1 | Hong Kong | 5 | 4 | 0 | 1 | 0 | 18 | 9 | +9 | 13 | Promoted to the 2024 Division II B |
| 2 | Ukraine | 5 | 4 | 0 | 0 | 1 | 22 | 6 | +16 | 12 | |
| 3 | Lithuania | 5 | 3 | 1 | 0 | 1 | 25 | 10 | +15 | 11 | |
| 4 | Romania (H) | 5 | 2 | 0 | 0 | 3 | 17 | 14 | +3 | 6 | |
| 5 | Bulgaria | 5 | 1 | 0 | 0 | 4 | 15 | 36 | −21 | 3 | |
| 6 | Estonia | 5 | 0 | 0 | 0 | 5 | 2 | 24 | −22 | 0 | Relegated to the 2024 Division III B |

Source: IIHF
Rules for classification: 1) points; 2) head-to-head points; 3) head-to-head goal difference; 4) head-to-head number of goals scored; 5) result against closest best-ranked team outside tied teams; 6) result against second-best ranked team outside tied teams; 7) seeding before tournament.
(H) Host

=== Group B ===
The Division III Group B tournament was played in Tnuvot, Israel, from 26 to 31 March 2023.

| Pos | Team | Pld | W | OTW | OTL | L | GF | GA | GD | Pts | Promotion |
|---|---|---|---|---|---|---|---|---|---|---|---|
| 1 | Serbia | 4 | 4 | 0 | 0 | 0 | 37 | 2 | +35 | 12 | Promoted to the 2024 Division III A |
| 2 | Israel (H) | 4 | 1 | 0 | 0 | 3 | 7 | 19 | −12 | 3 | |
| 3 | Bosnia and Herzegovina | 4 | 1 | 0 | 0 | 3 | 6 | 29 | −23 | 3 | |

Source: IIHF
Rules for classification: 1) points; 2) head-to-head points; 3) head-to-head goal difference; 4) head-to-head number of goals scored; 5) result against closest best-ranked team outside tied teams; 6) result against second-best ranked team outside tied teams; 7) seeding before tournament.
(H) Host
