= Alba Gonzalo =

Spanish ice hockey player (born 1997)

- Born: 27 April 1997 (age 29) Barcelona, Spain
- Height: 170 cm (5 ft 7 in)
- Weight: 68 kg (150 lb; 10 st 10 lb)
- Position: Goaltender
- Catches: Left
- NDHL team Former teams: Rögle BK: Södertälje SK; HV71; KJT Haukat Kerava; ASME Barcelona
- National team: Spain
- Playing career: 2014–present

Alba Gonzalo (born 27 April 1997) is a Spanish ice hockey goaltender and member of the Spanish national team. She has played with Rögle BK in the Swedish Nationella Damhockeyligan (NDHL) since 2023.

== Career ==
Gonzalo grew up playing football and basketball in Barcelona. She began playing inline hockey at the age of six, eventually switching to ice hockey when she 16, after a new team was founded in the Sant Adrià de Besòs district. She originally disliked the sport and ran into issues with her first coach limiting her ice time because of her gender, but was advised by her mother to stick with it. In 2014, FC Barcelona invited her to join their U18 ice hockey team and offered her occasional opportunities to train with the senior men's team.

In 2016, she left Spain to play for KJT Haukat in Finland, seeking better opportunities to develop on the advice of her head coach. Playing for KJT, she received no salary and had to fund herself.

After one year in Finland, she moved to Sweden to try out for HV71 in the SDHL. In her first season with the club, she only played seven games, originally serving as the team's third-string goalie before being promoted to the team's backup. Her first SDHL game was a 4-3 loss against Modo Hockey in mid-October 2017, with Michela Cava being the first SDHL player to score against her, scoring a hat-trick.

After one year in Sweden, she decided to return to Finland, signing with the Espoo Blues. When HV71 starting goaltender Sabina Eriksson injured herself before the start of the 2018–19 season, however, Gonzalo returned to Sweden to take over as HV71's starter. She played 30 games that season, finishing with the fourth best GAA among all league goaltenders who played more than 10 games.

She finished the 2019–20 SDHL season with the most wins, most shutouts, and best goals against average of any goaltender in the league.

=== International ===
Gonzalo debuted with the senior Spanish national team in 2014, playing her first match against Slovenia. She was named best goaltender as selected by the directorate at the 2016 IIHF Women's World Championship Division II B and 2018 IIHF Women's World Championship Division II B. Thanks in no small part to her stellar performance in net, the Spanish national team was able to earn promotion to the IIHF World Championship Division II A at the 2018 World Championship; she posted a goals against average of 0.94 and a .954 save percentage across the five games of the tournament.

== Personal life ==
Gonzalo has named NHL goaltender Carey Price as a role model. She served as an athlete ambassador for the 10th BCN Sports Film Festival in Barcelona in June 2019.
