= Mexico women's national ice hockey team =

Mexico
- Association: Mexico Ice Hockey Federation
- General manager: Joaquin de la Garma
- Head coach: Bernd Haake
- Assistants: Héctor Majul
- Captain: Andrea Ayala
- Most games: Berth González (75)
- Top scorer: Claudia Téllez (50)
- Most points: Claudia Téllez (85)
- Team colors
- IIHF code: MEX

Ranking
- Current IIHF: 25 ▲1 (3 June 2026)
- Highest IIHF: 25 (first in 2022)
- Lowest IIHF: 35 (first in 2014)

First international
- Argentina 1–0 Mexico (Cuautitlán Izcalli, Mexico; 18 February 2012)

Biggest win
- Mexico 17–0 Brazil (Mexico City, Mexico; 6 June 2017)

Biggest defeat
- Poland 9–0 Mexico (Bytom, Poland; 13 December 2024)

World Championships
- Appearances: 11 (first in 2014)
- Best result: 25th (2023)

International record (W–L–T)
- 37–40–0

The Mexico women's national ice hockey team is the women's national ice hockey team of Mexico. They are controlled by the Mexico Ice Hockey Federation, a member of the International Ice Hockey Federation.

== History ==
The Mexico women's national ice hockey team played its first game in March 2012 against Argentina in an exhibition game being held in Cuautitlán Izcalli, Mexico. Mexico lost the game 0–1. The following day they played their second of two exhibition matches against the Argentinian women's national team in Lerma, Mexico, which they won 7–1. The team is controlled by the Mexico Ice Hockey Federation. Forward Claudia Tellez was claimed by the Calgary Inferno in the 2016 CWHL Draft.

== World Championships record ==
- 2014 – Finished in 33rd place (1st in Division IIB Q)
- 2015 – Finished in 28th place (2nd in Division IIB)
- 2016 – Finished in 30th place (4th in Division IIB)
- 2017 – Finished in 27th place (1st in Division IIB)
- 2018 – Finished in 27th place (6th in Division IIA)
- 2019 – Finished in 26th place (4th in Division IIA)
- 2020 – Cancelled due to the COVID-19 pandemic
- 2021 – Cancelled due to the COVID-19 pandemic
- 2022 – Finished in 26th place (5th in Division IIA)
- 2023 – Finished in 25th place (3rd in Division IIA)
- 2024 – Finished in 25th place (3rd in Division IIA)
- 2025 – Finished in 28th place (6th in Division IIA, relegated to Division IIB)
- 2026 – Finished in 33rd place (5th in Division IIB)
