= Latvia women's national ice hockey team =

Latvia
- Association: Latvijas Hokeja Federācija
- General manager: Agnese Kārkliņa
- Head coach: Hannu Saintula
- Assistants: Vladislavs Koniševs; Miķelis Rēdlihs
- Captain: Līga Miljone
- Most games: Aija Balode (141)
- Top scorer: Inese Geca-Miljone (92)
- Most points: Inese Geca-Miljone (148)
- Team colors
- IIHF code: LAT
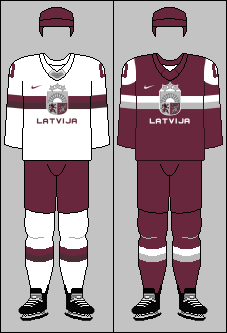

Ranking
- Current IIHF: 21 (▲2) (3 June 2026)
- Highest IIHF: 11 (2007)
- Lowest IIHF: 29 (first in 2022)

First international
- Ukraine 3–0 Latvia (Riga, Latvia; 1 November 1992)

Biggest win
- Latvia 39–0 Bulgaria (Liepāja, Latvia; 5 September 2008)

Biggest defeat
- Finland 17–0 Latvia (Riga, Latvia; 24 March 1995)

World Championship
- Appearances: 23 (first in 1999)
- Best result: 11th (2007, 2011)

International record (W–L–T)
- 87–107–7

The Latvian women's national ice hockey team represents Latvia at the International Ice Hockey Federation's IIHF Women's World Championship and is controlled by the Latvian Ice Hockey Federation (Latvian: Latvijas Hokeja federācija). In recent years, participation women's hockey has increased in Latvia; the number of registered women's players grew from 74 in 2018 to 223 in 2020.

== Tournament record ==
=== Olympic Games ===
Latvia never qualified for an Olympic tournament.

=== World Championship ===
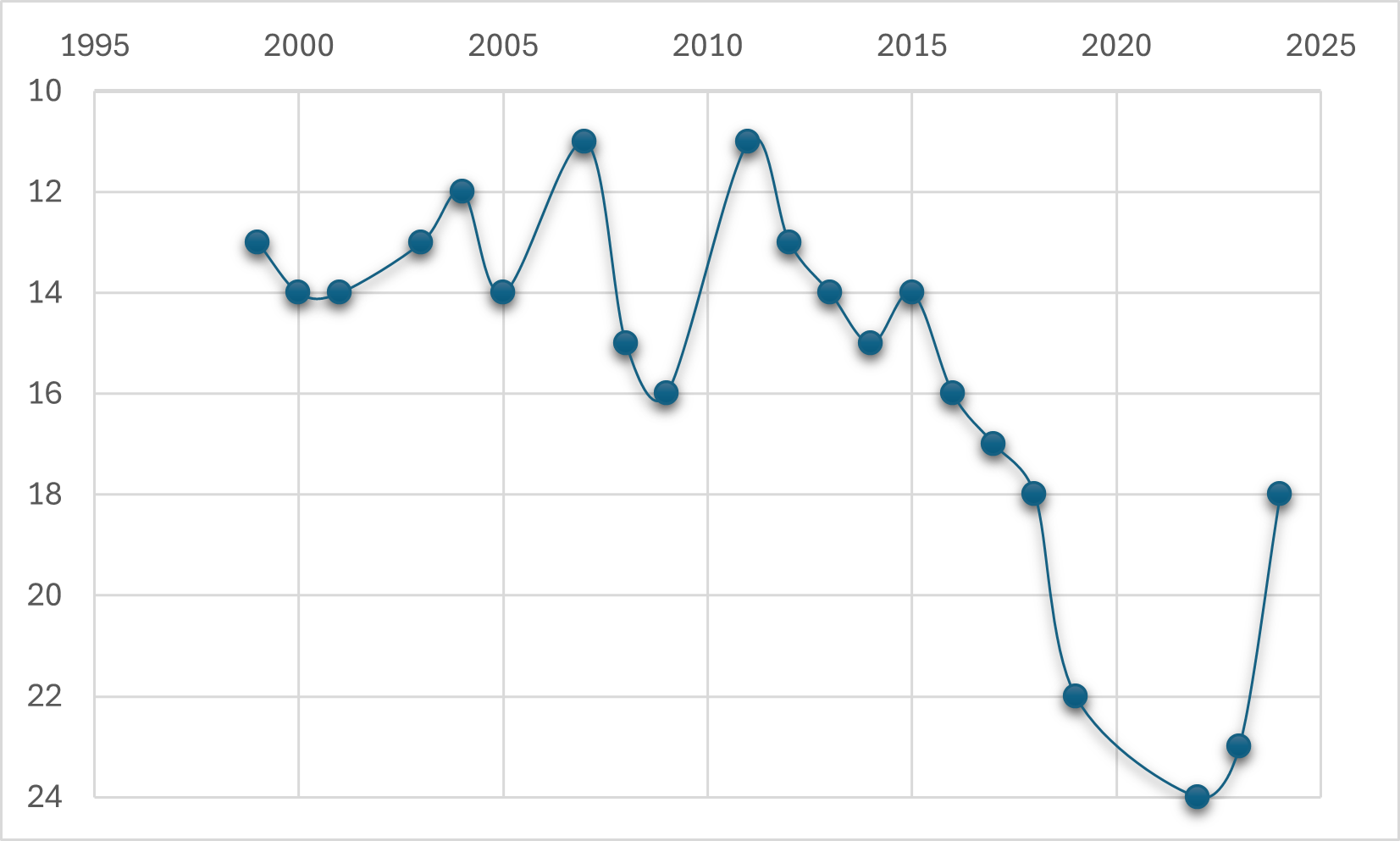
Graph shows Latvian results in IIHF World Championship since 1999.

Year	Finish
1999	Finished in 13th place (5th in Group B)
2000	Finished in 14th place (6th in Group B)
2001	Finished in 14th place (6th in Group B)
2003	Finished in 13th place (5th in Division I)
2004	Finished in 12th place (3rd in Division 1)
2005	Finished in 14th place (6th in Division 1)
2007	Finished in 11th place (2nd in Division I)
2008	Finished in 15th place (6th in Division I and relegated to Division II)
2009	Finished in 16th place (1st in Division II and promoted to Division I)
2011	Finished in 11th place (3rd in Division I)
2012	Finished in 13th place (5th in Division IA)
2013	Finished in 14th place (6th in Division IA and relegated to Division IB)
2014	Finished in 15th place (1st in Division IB and promoted to Division IA)
2015	Finished in 14th place (6th in Division IA and relegated to Division IB)
2016	Finished in 16th place (2nd in Division IB)
2017	Finished in 17th place (3rd in Division IB)
2018	Finished in 18th place (3rd in Division IB)
2019	Finished in 22nd place (6th in Division IB and relegated to Division IIA)
2020	Cancelled due to the COVID-19 pandemic
2021	Cancelled due to the COVID-19 pandemic
2022	Finished in 24th place (2nd in Division IIA)
2023	Finished in 23rd place (1st in Division IIA and promoted to Division IB)
2024	Finished in 18th place (2nd in Division IB)
2025	Finished in 18th place (2nd in Division IB)
2026	Finished in 21st place (5th in Division IB)

=== European Championship ===
Year	Finish
1993	Finished First place in Group B (promoted to group A)
1995	Finished 6th place (demoted to Group B)
1996	Finished second place in Group B
