= 2024 IIHF Women's World Championship Division II =

Ice hockey tournaments

Tournament details
- Host countries: Andorra; Turkey
- Venues: 2 (in 2 host cities)
- Dates: 7–13 April; 1–7 April
- Teams: 12

The 2024 IIHF Women's World Championship Division II consisted of two international ice hockey tournaments of the 2024 Women's Ice Hockey World Championships organised by the International Ice Hockey Federation (IIHF).

The Group A tournament was played in Canillo, Andorra, from 7 to 13 April and Group B in Istanbul, Turkey, from 1 to 7 April 2024.

In Group A, Kazakhstan won the tournament and was promoted and Belgium was relegated. North Korea was promoted after winning Group B, while South Africa was relegated.

== Group A tournament ==
2024 IIHF Women's World Championship Division II A

Tournament details
- Host country: Andorra
- City: Canillo
- Venue: 1 (in 1 host city)
- Dates: 7–13 April
- Teams: 6

Tournament statistics
- Games played: 15
- Goals scored: 89 (5.93 per game)
- Attendance: 2,595 (173 per game)
- Scoring leader: (Spain) Vega Muñoz (9 points)

Official website
- IIHF

=== Participants ===
Team	Qualification
Kazakhstan	Placed 6th in 2023 Division I B and was relegated.
Spain	Placed 2nd in 2023 Division II A.
Mexico	Placed 3rd in 2023 Division II A.
Chinese Taipei	Placed 4th in 2023 Division II A.
Iceland	Placed 5th in 2023 Division II A.
Belgium	Placed 1st in 2023 Division II B and was promoted.

=== Match officials ===
Four referees and seven linesmen were selected for the tournament.

Referees	Linesmen
(Canada) Marie-Ève Couture; (Czech Republic) Gabriela Malá; (France) Marie Picavet; (Sweden) Sabina Küller	(Canada) Stéphanie Gagnon; (China) Wang Hui; (Germany) Julia Strube; (Germany) Julia Wagner; (Poland) Monika Szpyt-Jucha; (Sweden) Hanna Öberg; (Switzerland) Michele Müller

=== Standings ===
Pos	Team	Pld	W	OTW	OTL	L	GF	GA	GD	Pts	Promotion or relegation
1	Kazakhstan	5	5	0	0	0	28	9	+19	15	Promoted to the 2025 Division I B
2	Spain	5	4	0	0	1	25	6	+19	12	
3	Mexico	5	3	0	0	2	13	9	+4	9	
4	Chinese Taipei	5	2	0	0	3	8	11	−3	6	
5	Iceland	5	1	0	0	4	9	23	−14	3	
6	Belgium	5	0	0	0	5	6	31	−25	0	Relegated to the 2025 Division II B

Source: IIHF
Rules for classification: 1) points; 2) head-to-head points; 3) head-to-head goal difference; 4) head-to-head number of goals scored; 5) result against closest best-ranked team outside tied teams; 6) result against second-best ranked team outside tied teams; 7) seeding before tournament.

=== Results ===
All times are local (UTC+2)

7 April 2024; 13:00	Belgium	1–3 (0–2, 1–1, 0–0)	Chinese Taipei	Canillo Ice Palace, Canillo; Attendance: 40

Game reference

Maud Smits
Goalies
Hsu Tzu-ting
Referee:
(Sweden) Sabina Küller
Linesmen:
(Canada) Stéphanie Gagnon
(Germany) Julia Strube

	0–1	09:26 – Huang Y. (Chang En-w.)
	0–2	18:39 – Hsieh (Liu)
Steeno (SH) – 30:13	1–2
	1–3	31:22 – Huang Y. (Huang M.) (PP)

4 min
Penalties
2 min
16
Shots
31

7 April 2024; 16:30	Mexico	2–4 (0–0, 2–2, 0–2)	Kazakhstan	Canillo Ice Palace, Canillo; Attendance: 86

Game reference

Mónica Rentería
Goalies
Arina Chshyokolova
Referee:
(Canada) Marie-Ève Couture
Linesmen:
(Switzerland) Michele Müller
(Poland) Monika Szpyt-Jucha

	0–1	23:24 – Ashimova (Aldabergenova, Tursynova)
G. Rojas (Téllez, Hagerman) – 25:35	1–1
	1–2	27:41 – Moldabay (M. Sayakhatkyzy)
G. Rojas (J. Rojas) – 37:05	2–2
	2–3	45:51 – Orazbayeva (M. Sayakhatkyzy)
	2–4	50:45 – M. Sayakhatkyzy

6 min
Penalties
4 min
14
Shots
41

7 April 2024; 20:00	Spain	8–0 (3–0, 2–0, 3–0)	Iceland	Canillo Ice Palace, Canillo; Attendance: 376

Game reference

Alba Gonzalo
Carolina Moreno
Goalies
Birta Helgadóttir
Andrea Bachmann
Referee:
(Czech Republic) Gabriela Malá
Linesmen:
(Sweden) Hanna Öberg
(Germany) Julia Wagner

Castellanos (O'Hare) – 02:54	1–0
O'Hare (Garcia, Serna) – 13:58	2–0
Muñoz (Martin, Scilipoti) – 18:53	3–0
Scilipoti (Álvarez) – 20:21	4–0
N. Gimenez (Muñoz, Scilipoti) (PP) – 29:13	5–0
Muñoz (Castellanos, Álvarez) – 52:05	6–0
Fernández (O'Hare) – 58:46	7–0
N. Gimenez (P. Moreno) – 58:59	8–0

4 min
Penalties
8 min
33
Shots
10

8 April 2024; 13:00	Kazakhstan	3–0 (0–0, 2–0, 1–0)	Chinese Taipei	Canillo Ice Palace, Canillo; Attendance: 32

Game reference

Arina Chshyokolova
Goalies
Hsu Tzu-ting
Chung Ai
Referee:
(France) Marie Picavet
Linesmen:
(Poland) Monika Szpyt-Jucha
(China) Wang Hui

Shegay (Tursynova) – 30:47	1–0
Butorina (Filimonova) – 36:02	2–0
Orazbayeva (Moldabay, Shegay) (SH) – 46:05	3–0

14 min
Penalties
6 min
33
Shots
19

8 April 2024; 16:30	Iceland	5–2 (3–0, 1–1, 1–1)	Belgium	Canillo Ice Palace, Canillo; Attendance: 49

Game reference

Birta Helgadóttir
Goalies
Maud Smits
Referee:
(Canada) Marie-Ève Couture
Linesmen:
(Switzerland) Michele Müller
(Sweden) Hanna Öberg

Ka. Björnsdóttir (Su. Björgvinsdóttir, Blöndal) (PP) – 03:55	1–0
Ko. Björnsdóttir (Garðarsdóttir, Si. Björgvinsdóttir) – 10:10	2–0
Árnadóttir (Aradóttir, Snorradóttir) – 12:24	3–0
	3–1	20:49 – De Guchtenaere (Steeno, Leyen)
Bjarnadóttir (Si. Björgvinsdóttir) – 35:12	4–1
	4–2	56:17 – Steeno (De Guchtenaere, Bosmans) (PP)
Si. Björgvinsdóttir (Snorradóttir, Garðarsdóttir) – 59:17	5–2

8 min
Penalties
6 min
21
Shots
13

8 April 2024; 20:00	Spain	3–0 (1–0, 0–0, 2–0)	Mexico	Canillo Ice Palace, Canillo; Attendance: 320

Game reference

Alba Gonzalo
Carolina Moreno
Goalies
Mónica Rentería
Referee:
(Sweden) Sabina Küller
Linesmen:
(Canada) Stéphanie Gagnon
(Germany) Julia Wagner

Gil (P. Giménez) (PP) – 09:16	1–0
O'Hare (P. Giménez, Fernández) (PP) – 57:06	2–0
Álvarez (EN) – 59:39	3–0

33 min
Penalties
35 min
32
Shots
22

10 April 2024; 13:00	Kazakhstan	7–2 (5–0, 2–1, 0–1)	Iceland	Canillo Ice Palace, Canillo; Attendance: 58

Game reference

Arina Chshyokolova
Goalies
Birta Helgadóttir
Andrea Bachmann
Referee:
(France) Marie Picavet
Linesmen:
(Canada) Stéphanie Gagnon
(Germany) Julia Strube

Kutsenko (Filimonova) – 01:18	1–0
Kutsenko (D. Sayakhatkyzy, Dubrovskaya) – 05:29	2–0
M. Sayakhatkyzy (Orazbayeva, Shegay) – 11:19	3–0
Shegay – 14:24	4–0
Felzink (Voronova) (PP) – 19:56	5–0
M. Sayakhatkyzy (Orazbayeva) – 23:04	6–0
Orazbayeva (M. Sayakhatkyzy) – 33:08	7–0
	7–1	36:22 – Murphy (Bjarnadóttir)
	7–2	42:58 – Ka. Björnsdóttir (Jóhannsdóttir, Garðarsdóttir)

10 min
Penalties
8 min
34
Shots
18

10 April 2024; 16:30	Mexico	2–1 (0–0, 1–0, 1–1)	Chinese Taipei	Canillo Ice Palace, Canillo; Attendance: 79

Game reference

Mónica Rentería
Goalies
Hsu Tzu-ting
Referee:
(Sweden) Sabina Küller
Linesmen:
(Switzerland) Michele Müller
(Poland) Monika Szpyt-Jucha

Chávez (Ayala, Téllez) (PP) – 33:42	1–0
J. Rojas (Rosales) – 47:45	2–0
	2–1	55:02 – Lin C. (Tao)

8 min
Penalties
6 min
22
Shots
19

10 April 2024; 20:00	Spain	8–0 (4–0, 2–0, 2–0)	Belgium	Canillo Ice Palace, Canillo; Attendance: 226

Game reference

Carolina Moreno
Alba Gonzalo
Goalies
Maud Smits
Charlotte Swinnen
Referee:
(Czech Republic) Gabriela Malá
Linesmen:
(Germany) Julia Wagner
(China) Wang Hui

Muñoz (Scilipoti, Fernández) – 04:19	1–0
N. Gimenez (Serna, P. Moreno) – 04:42	2–0
Scilipoti (Álvarez) – 05:52	3–0
Fernández – 11:23	4–0
Fernández (Muñoz, Scilipoti) – 23:48	5–0
Castellanos (Serna, O'Hare) – 28:07	6–0
P. Moreno – 49:04	7–0
P. Gimenez (O'Hare) (PP) – 59:16	8–0

2 min
Penalties
2 min
59
Shots
18

11 April 2024; 13:00	Iceland	0–3 (0–0, 0–1, 0–2)	Mexico	Canillo Ice Palace, Canillo; Attendance: 136

Game reference

Andrea Bachmann
Goalies
Mónica Rentería
Referee:
(Czech Republic) Gabriela Malá
Linesmen:
(Germany) Julia Strube
(Germany) Julia Wagner

0–1	31:52 – Heon (González) (PP)
0–2	55:01 – J. Rojas (Heon)
0–3	57:24 – G. Rojas (J. Rojas, Téllez) (PP)

12 min
Penalties
6 min
28
Shots
33

11 April 2024; 16:30	Belgium	2–9 (0–5, 2–2, 0–2)	Kazakhstan	Canillo Ice Palace, Canillo; Attendance: 78

Game reference

Maud Smits
Charlotte Swinnen
Goalies
Arina Chshyokolova
Polina Govtva
Referee:
(Canada) Marie-Ève Couture
Linesmen:
(Sweden) Hanna Öberg
(China) Wang Hui

	0–1	03:51 – Sviridova (Olzhabayeva, Pyatkova)
	0–2	04:36 – D. Sayakhatkyzy (Butorina)
	0–3	06:58 – Kutsenko (Butorina, Filimonova)
	0–4	12:02 – Aldabergenova (Ashimova, Sviridova)
	0–5	14:27 – Aldabergenova (Sviridova)
De Guchtenaere (Steeno) – 31:54	1–5
	1–6	34:16 – Pyatkova (Ashimova)
De Guchtenaere (Bosmans, Steeno) – 38:20	2–6
	2–7	38:33 – Felzink (Voronova)
	2–8	51:19 – Ashimova (SH)
	2–9	52:35 – Shegay (SH)

2 min
Penalties
4 min
9
Shots
64

11 April 2024; 20:00	Chinese Taipei	1–3 (0–1, 1–1, 0–1)	Spain	Canillo Ice Palace, Canillo; Attendance: 283

Game reference

Hsu Tzu-ting
Chung Ai
Goalies
Alba Gonzalo
Referee:
(France) Marie Picavet
Linesmen:
(Canada) Stéphanie Gagnon
(Switzerland) Michele Müller

	0–1	14:38 – Gil (Romero)
	0–2	24:07 – Serna (Scilipoti, O'Hare)
Huang Y. (Yeh H.) – 34:14	1–2
	1–3	48:02 – Fernández (Muñoz, Álvarez)

4 min
Penalties
8 min
12
Shots
52

13 April 2024; 13:00	Mexico	6–1 (1–0, 1–0, 4–1)	Belgium	Canillo Ice Palace, Canillo; Attendance: 74

Game reference

Miranda de Antunano
Goalies
Charlotte Swinnen
Maud Smits
Referee:
(France) Marie Picavet
Linesmen:
(Sweden) Hanna Öberg
(China) Wang Hui

G. Rojas (Téllez) – 07:26	1–0
J. Rojas (Ayala, Chávez) (PP) – 36:15	2–0
J. Rojas (Téllez, G. Rojas) – 45:15	3–0
Nevárez (Viñals, Olivares) – 46:10	4–0
Dueñas – 46:22	5–0
	5–1	57:14 – Steeno (Bosmans, Wagemans)
Téllez (J. Rojas) – 59:14	6–1

4 min
Penalties
4 min
41
Shots
17

13 April 2024; 16:30	Chinese Taipei	3–2 (1–0, 0–2, 2–0)	Iceland	Canillo Ice Palace, Canillo; Attendance: 97

Game reference

Chung Ai
Goalies
Andrea Bachmann
Referee:
(Canada) Marie-Ève Couture
Linesmen:
(Germany) Julia Strube
(Poland) Monika Szpyt-Jucha

Huang Y. (Yeh H., Chao) – 12:35	1–0
	1–1	32:25 – Si. Björgvinsdóttir (Sigfinnsdóttir)
	1–2	35:47 – Su. Björgvinsdóttir (Ka. Björnsdóttir)
Huang Y. (Chang En-ni, Sha) – 52:15	2–2
Chao (Yeh H.) (PP) – 59:10	3–2

0 min
Penalties
8 min
29
Shots
28

13 April 2024; 20:00	Kazakhstan	5–3 (1–1, 1–2, 3–0)	Spain	Canillo Ice Palace, Canillo; Attendance: 661

Game reference

Arina Chshyokolova
Goalies
Alba Gonzalo
Referee:
(Sweden) Sabina Küller
Linesmen:
(Canada) Stéphanie Gagnon
(Germany) Julia Wagner

	0–1	09:58 – N. Gimenez (Fernández, Muñoz)
Sviridova (Aldabergenova) – 10:06	1–1
	1–2	27:48 – N. Gimenez (Muñoz, Fernández)
Orazbayeva (PP) – 33:48	2–2
	2–3	39:48 – Muñoz (O'Hare)
Orazbayeva (M. Sayakhatkyzy) – 41:41	3–3
Shegay – 59:22	4–3
Ashimova (EN) – 59:46	5–3

6 min
Penalties
10 min
29
Shots
32

=== Statistics ===
==== Scoring leaders ====
List shows the top skaters sorted by points, then goals.

Player	GP	G	A	Pts	+/−	PIM	POS
(Spain) Vega Muñoz	5	4	5	9	+10	2	F
(Spain) Bridget O'Hare	5	2	6	8	+8	4	D
(Kazakhstan) Anastassiya Orazbayeva	5	5	2	7	+6	2	F
(Spain) Haizea Fernández	5	4	3	7	+8	6	F
(Mexico) Joanna Rojas	5	4	3	7	+5	10	F
(Kazakhstan) Munira Sayakhatkyzy	5	3	4	7	+9	2	F
(Spain) Sofia Scilipoti	5	2	5	7	+9	0	F
(Kazakhstan) Alexandra Shegay	5	4	2	6	+7	0	F
(Belgium) Anke Steeno	5	3	3	6	−3	6	F
(Spain) Elena Álvarez	5	1	5	6	+8	4	D
(Mexico) Claudia Téllez	5	1	5	6	+1	4	F

GP = Games played; G = Goals; A = Assists; Pts = Points; +/− = Plus/Minus; PIM = Penalties in Minutes; POS = Position
Source: IIHF.com

==== Goaltending leaders ====
Only the top five goaltenders, based on save percentage, who have played at least 40% of their team's minutes, are included in this list.

Player	TOI	GA	GAA	SA	Sv%	SO
(Mexico) Mónica Rentería	239:40	7	1.75	119	94.12	1
(Chinese Taipei) Chung Ai	145:24	5	2.06	77	93.51	0
(Chinese Taipei) Hsu Tzu-ting	153:45	6	2.34	74	91.89	0
(Kazakhstan) Arina Chshyokolova	269:10	7	1.56	86	91.86	1
(Spain) Alba Gonzalo	204:56	5	1.46	59	91.53	0

TOI = time on ice (minutes:seconds); SA = shots against; GA = goals against; GAA = goals against average; Sv% = save percentage; SO = shutouts
Source: IIHF.com

=== Awards ===
Position	Player
Goaltender	(Kazakhstan) Arina Chshyokolova
Defenceman	(Spain) Bridget O'Hare
Forward	(Kazakhstan) Alexandra Shegay

== Group B tournament ==
2024 IIHF Women's World Championship Division II B

Tournament details
- Host country: Turkey
- City: Istanbul
- Venue: 1 (in 1 host city)
- Dates: 1–7 April
- Teams: 6

Tournament statistics
- Games played: 15
- Goals scored: 103 (6.87 per game)
- Attendance: 2,235 (149 per game)
- Scoring leader: (North Korea) Kim Un-hyang (13 points)

Official website
- IIHF

=== Participants ===
Team	Qualification
North Korea	Withdrew from 2023 Division II A and was relegated.
Australia	Placed 2nd in 2023 Division II B.
New Zealand	Placed 3rd in 2023 Division II B.
South Africa	Placed 4th in 2023 Division II B.
Turkey	Host, withdrew from 2023 Division II B due to the 2023 Turkey–Syria earthquake but kept their place.
Hong Kong	Placed 1st in 2023 Division III A and was promoted.

=== Match officials ===
Four referees and seven linesmen were selected for the tournament.

Referees	Linesmen
(China) Na Mengyuan; (Czech Republic) Ilona Novotná; (Slovakia) Nikoleta Celárová; (Slovakia) Michaela Matejová	(Austria) Anja Klemm; (Finland) Helina Anttila; (France) Sueva Torribio; (Hungary) Csilla Péter; (Iceland) Ingibjörg Hjartardóttir; (Iceland) Guðlaug Torsteinsdóttir; (Italy) Danielle Rostan

=== Standings ===
Pos	Team	Pld	W	OTW	OTL	L	GF	GA	GD	Pts	Promotion or relegation
1	North Korea	5	4	1	0	0	30	4	+26	14	Promoted to the 2025 Division II A
2	Australia	5	4	0	1	0	31	4	+27	13	
3	Hong Kong	5	2	0	0	3	10	10	0	6 (Note: Hong Kong 3 Pts, +1 GD, New Zealand 3 Pts, 0 GD; Turkey 3 Pts, − 1 GD)	
4	New Zealand	5	2	0	0	3	18	12	+6	6	
5	Turkey (H)	5	2	0	0	3	13	17	−4	6	
6	South Africa	5	0	0	0	5	1	56	−55	0	Relegated to the 2025 Division III A

Source: IIHF
Rules for classification: 1) points; 2) head-to-head points; 3) head-to-head goal difference; 4) head-to-head number of goals scored; 5) result against closest best-ranked team outside tied teams; 6) result against second-best ranked team outside tied teams; 7) seeding before tournament.
(H) Host

=== Results ===
All times are local (UTC+3)

1 April 2024; 13:00	New Zealand	1–5 (0–2, 0–2, 1–1)	North Korea	Silivrikapı Ice Skating Hall, Istanbul; Attendance: 30

Game reference

Lochlyn Hyde
Goalies
Jo Kum-hyang
Referee:
(Slovakia) Nikoleta Celárová
Linesmen:
(Finland) Helina Anttila
(France) Sueva Torribio

	0–1	06:03 – Rim (Kim Un-h.)
	0–2	07:01 – Jong S. (Ryu, Kim Un-h.)
	0–3	28:00 – Pak C. (Jang, Kim K.)
	0–4	32:11 – Kim Un-h. (Jang) (SH)
	0–5	46:39 – Jang (Kim K., Pak C.)
Blong (Hansen) – 59:57	1–5

6 min
Penalties
6 min
25
Shots
35

1 April 2024; 16:30	Hong Kong	6–0 (4–0, 1–0, 1–0)	South Africa	Silivrikapı Ice Skating Hall, Istanbul; Attendance: 45

Game reference

Chau Sumi
Goalies
Monique van Dyk
Referee:
(Czech Republic) Ilona Novotná
Linesmen:
(Italy) Danielle Rostan
(Iceland) Guðlaug Torsteinsdóttir

Ch. Wong – 04:22	1–0
Ng (I. Li, Ip) (PP) – 06:54	2–0
Ng (Ip) – 11:50	3–0
Tam (I. Li) (SH) – 17:51	4–0
Ch. Wong (Ip, Lam) (PP) – 24:03	5–0
Ng (Ip) (SH) – 59:26	6–0

12 min
Penalties
12 min
26
Shots
3

1 April 2024; 20:30	Australia	6–2 (2–1, 2–1, 2–0)	Turkey	Silivrikapı Ice Skating Hall, Istanbul; Attendance: 400

Game reference

Olivia Last
Goalies
Azra Sert
Referee:
(Slovakia) Michaela Matejová
Linesmen:
(Iceland) Ingibjörg Hjartardóttir
(Austria) Anja Klemm

Cochrane (Godfrey, Kiliwnik) – 00:24	1–0
	1–1	03:32 – Arslan (Lökbaş, Yavuz) (SH)
Pethrick (Clark-Crumpton, Tihema) – 16:29	2–1
	2–2	21:39 – Oğuz (Lökbaş)
Kiliwnik (Venus) – 31:12	3–2
Sharp (Pullin, McLellan) – 31:45	4–2
Clark-Crumpton (Malthaner) – 49:33	5–2
Mahoney (Malthaner) – 57:25	6–2

8 min
Penalties
6 min
48
Shots
5

2 April 2024; 13:00	North Korea	14–0 (3–0, 4–0, 7–0)	South Africa	Silivrikapı Ice Skating Hall, Istanbul; Attendance: 45

Game reference

Ri Pom
Goalies
Monique van Dyk
Akaisha McNamara
Referee:
(China) Na Mengyuan
Linesmen:
(Iceland) Ingibjörg Hjartardóttir
(Hungary) Csilla Péter

Ryu (Kim Un-h., Rim) (SH) – 10:54	1–0
Kim Un-h. (Ryu, Jong S.) – 17:39	2–0
Pak C. (Kim K., Ro M.) – 17:58	3–0
Kim Un-h. (Ryu) (SH) – 20:18	4–0
Jang (Ro M.) – 25:06	5–0
Kim J. (Kim P., Ri Y.) – 28:53	6–0
Kim K. (Pak C., Ro K.) – 36:57	7–0
Ryu (Jong S., Rim) – 40:14	8–0
Pak I. (Ri Y., Kim P.) – 44:44	9–0
Jang (Jo U., Ro K.) – 47:05	10–0
Kim Un-h. (Jong K., Jong S.) – 48:21	11–0
Jang (Pak C.) – 49:29	12–0
Kim Un-h. (Ryu, Jong K.) – 50:45	13–0
Jong K. (Kim Un-h., Ryu) (PP) – 53:38	14–0

6 min
Penalties
4 min
38
Shots
5

2 April 2024; 16:30	Australia	4–0 (0–0, 2–0, 2–0)	New Zealand	Silivrikapı Ice Skating Hall, Istanbul; Attendance: 75

Game reference

Olivia Last
Goalies
Lochlyn Hyde
Referee:
(Slovakia) Nikoleta Celárová
Linesmen:
(Iceland) Guðlaug Torsteinsdóttir
(France) Sueva Torribio

P. Roberts (Sammons, L. Roberts) – 20:42	1–0
Sharp (PS) – 33:54	2–0
Sammons (Venus, Pethrick) (PP) – 48:54	3–0
Sharp (Venus) (PP) – 55:09	4–0

12 min
Penalties
6 min
24
Shots
23

2 April 2024; 20:30	Turkey	0–2 (0–1, 0–0, 0–1)	Hong Kong	Silivrikapı Ice Skating Hall, Istanbul; Attendance: 100

Game reference
Erva Kanat	Goalies	Keira Mok	Referee: (Slovakia) Michaela Matejová; Linesmen: (Austria) Anja Klemm (Italy) Danielle Rostan
0–1 / 02:28 – Ng (I. Li, Lam) (PP); 0–2 / 56:38 – Ng (Huang)			Referee: (Slovakia) Michaela Matejová; Linesmen: (Austria) Anja Klemm (Italy) Danielle Rostan
12 min	Penalties	8 min	Referee: (Slovakia) Michaela Matejová; Linesmen: (Austria) Anja Klemm (Italy) Danielle Rostan
20	Shots	21	Referee: (Slovakia) Michaela Matejová; Linesmen: (Austria) Anja Klemm (Italy) Danielle Rostan

4 April 2024; 13:00	New Zealand	14–0 (6–0, 2–0, 6–0)	South Africa	Silivrikapı Ice Skating Hall, Istanbul; Attendance: 35

Game reference

Breane Byck
Goalies
Monique van Dyck
Referee:
(China) Na Mengyuan
Linesmen:
(Finland) Helina Anttila
(Italy) Danielle Rostan

Scott (Gregory) – 00:25	1–0
Hansen (Blong, Hollyer) – 04:46	2–0
C. Heale (Mulari) – 13:20	3–0
Mulari – 15:19	4–0
Hefford (Kloss, C. Heale) – 17:21	5–0
Mills (Hollyer, Gregory) (PP) – 19:52	6–0
C. Heale (Kloss, Mills) – 21:40	7–0
Hansen (Blong) – 37:50	8–0
Blong (PP) – 43:23	9–0
Bryant (Gregory, A. Heale) – 47:56	10–0
Hansen (Blong, Helmersson) – 49:00	11–0
A. Heale – 55:38	12–0
Mulari (Blong, Hansen) – 57:43	13–0
Bryant – 58:54	14–0

8 min
Penalties
12 min
57
Shots
5

4 April 2024; 16:30	Australia	6–0 (2–0, 4–0, 0–0)	Hong Kong	Silivrikapı Ice Skating Hall, Istanbul; Attendance: 45

Game reference

Sasha King
Goalies
Chau Sumi
Keira Mok
Referee:
(Slovakia) Nikoleta Celárová
Linesmen:
(Austria) Anja Klemm
(France) Sueva Torribio

Venus (L. Roberts, Sharp) – 02:03	1–0
Sharp (Sammons, P. Roberts) – 05:17	2–0
Godfrey (Pullin) – 21:27	3–0
Malthaner (Tihema) – 24:05	4–0
Sammons (Tihema, Clark-Crumpton) – 29:51	5–0
Godfrey (Cochrane, Venus) (PP) – 36:40	6–0

8 min
Penalties
6 min
56
Shots
7

4 April 2024; 20:30	North Korea	7–1 (4–1, 3–0, 0–0)	Turkey	Silivrikapı Ice Skating Hall, Istanbul; Attendance: 450

Game reference

Ri Pom
Goalies
Azra Sert
Erva Kanat
Referee:
(Czech Republic) Ilona Novotná
Linesmen:
(Hungary) Csilla Péter
(Iceland) Guðlaug Torsteinsdóttir

Jang (Kim K., Rim) – 00:51	1–0
Pak C. (Jang, Ro K.) – 11:45	2–0
Kim K. (Ryu) (PP) – 14:27	3–0
	3–1	16:54 – Koçak (Yavuz, Demir) (PP)
Ryu (Jong K., Kim Un-h.) (PP) – 18:21	4–1
Ryu (Jong S.) – 25:48	5–1
Rim (Jong K., Jong S.) – 31:48	6–1
Ryu (Kim Un-h., Jong S.) (PP) – 36:09	7–1

8 min
Penalties
14 min
32
Shots
14

5 April 2024; 13:00	South Africa	0–14 (0–5, 0–5, 0–4)	Australia	Silivrikapı Ice Skating Hall, Istanbul; Attendance: 30

Game reference

Monique van Dyk
Goalies
Sasha King
Referee:
(Czech Republic) Ilona Novotná
Linesmen:
(Italy) Danielle Rostan
(France) Sueva Torribio

0–1	03:36 – Clark-Crumpton (Venus, Pethrick)
0–2	04:22 – Godfrey (Kiliwnik)
0–3	10:25 – Sharp (Godfrey, Kiliwnik)
0–4	16:07 – Kiliwnik (Sharp, Godfrey) (PP)
0–5	17:18 – Tihema (McLellan, Clark-Crumpton) (PP)
0–6	21:21 – Sammons (Sharp)
0–7	23:23 – Clark-Crumpton (Pethrick)
0–8	31:15 – Sammons (Sharp, Venus)
0–9	37:51 – Calabria (Lukowiak, Arps)
0–10	39:05 – McLellan (Pullin, Kiliwnik)
0–11	43:01 – Malthaner (Lukowiak, Clark-Crumpton)
0–12	45:57 – P. Roberts (Sammons, Godfrey)
0–13	49:56 – Mahoney (Tihema)
0–14	50:18 – Kiliwnik (Cochrane, Godfrey)

6 min
Penalties
6 min
2
Shots
59

5 April 2024; 16:30	Hong Kong	1–2 (0–1, 0–0, 1–1)	North Korea	Silivrikapı Ice Skating Hall, Istanbul; Attendance: 30

Game reference

Keira Mok
Goalies
Ri Pom
Referee:
(Slovakia) Michaela Matejová
Linesmen:
(Finland) Helina Anttila
(Austria) Anja Klemm

	0–1	06:53 – Ryu (Kim Un-h.) (SH)
Ng (Tam, Ch. Wong) (PP) – 44:01	1–1
	1–2	59:04 – Ro M. (Ro K., Kim K.)

18 min
Penalties
12 min
15
Shots
50

5 April 2024; 20:30	Turkey	2–1 (0–0, 1–0, 1–1)	New Zealand	Silivrikapı Ice Skating Hall, Istanbul; Attendance: 450

Game reference

Erva Kanat
Goalies
Breane Byck
Referee:
(China) Na Mengyuan
Linesmen:
(Hungary) Csilla Péter
(Iceland) Guðlaug Torsteinsdóttir

Koçak (Kaya) (PP) – 35:05	1–0
	1–1	50:27 – Blong (Mulari) (SH)
Kaya (Taygar) – 54:59	2–1

8 min
Penalties
6 min
10
Shots
36

7 April 2024; 13:00	New Zealand	2–1 (0–0, 1–1, 1–0)	Hong Kong	Silivrikapı Ice Skating Hall, Istanbul; Attendance: 45

Game reference

Lochlyn Hyde
Goalies
Keira Mok
Referee:
(Slovakia) Nikoleta Celárová
Linesmen:
(Finland) Helina Anttila
(Austria) Anja Klemm

Blong (Hansen, Mulari) – 31:41	1–0
	1–1	38:06 – Ch. Wong (Ng, Kwok)
Hollyer (A. Heale, Mulari) (PP) – 57:27	2–1

10 min
Penalties
6 min
31
Shots
10

7 April 2024; 16:30	North Korea	2–1 GWS (1–0, 0–1, 0–0) (OT: 0–0) (SO: 1–0)	Australia	Silivrikapı Ice Skating Hall, Istanbul; Attendance: 55

Game reference
Jo Kum-hyang	Goalies	Olivia Last	Referee: (Slovakia) Michaela Matejová; Linesmen: (Hungary) Csilla Péter (France) Sueva Torribio
Jong S. (Kim Un-h., Rim) – 18:20 / 1–0; / 1–1 / 37:32 – Sharp (Sammons, P. Roberts)			Referee: (Slovakia) Michaela Matejová; Linesmen: (Hungary) Csilla Péter (France) Sueva Torribio
Jong S. Jang; Ro K. (miss); Ryu (miss); Pak C. (miss)	Shootout	P. Roberts; (miss) Pethrick; (miss) Sharp; (miss) Sammons; (miss) Godfrey	Referee: (Slovakia) Michaela Matejová; Linesmen: (Hungary) Csilla Péter (France) Sueva Torribio
6 min	Penalties	4 min	Referee: (Slovakia) Michaela Matejová; Linesmen: (Hungary) Csilla Péter (France) Sueva Torribio
22	Shots	28	Referee: (Slovakia) Michaela Matejová; Linesmen: (Hungary) Csilla Péter (France) Sueva Torribio

7 April 2024; 20:30	South Africa	1–8 (0–3, 0–2, 1–3)	Turkey	Silivrikapı Ice Skating Hall, Istanbul; Attendance: 400

Game reference

Monique van Dyk
Akaisha McNamara
Goalies
Erva Kanat
Ekin Köksal
Referee:
(Czech Republic) Ilona Novotná
Linesmen:
(Iceland) Ingibjörg Hjartardóttir
(Italy) Danielle Rostan

	0–1	02:43 – Özer Atali, Tuna)
	0–2	09:04 – Oğuz (Yavuz)
	0–3	10:09 – Arslan (Lökbaş)
	0–4	23:20 – Tuna (Özer)
	0–5	31:05 – Taygar (Koçak)
Rhode (Lechtanski) (PP) – 46:29	1–5
	1–6	53:23 – Kaya (Taygar)
	1–7	53:37 – Kaya (Taygar)
	1–8	59:43 – Atali (Özer, Tuna)

4 min
Penalties
8 min
9
Shots
37

=== Statistics ===
==== Scoring leaders ====
List shows the top skaters sorted by points, then goals.

Player	GP	G	A	Pts	+/−	PIM	POS
(North Korea) Kim Un-hyang	5	5	8	13	+13	4	F
(North Korea) Ryu Sol-mi	5	6	6	12	+10	0	F
(Australia) Nikki Sharp	5	6	4	10	+6	0	F
(North Korea) Jang Hyang	5	5	3	8	+8	4	F
(New Zealand) Katya Blong	5	4	4	8	+3	6	F
(Australia) Sara Sammons	5	4	4	8	+9	0	F
(Australia) Sharna Godfrey	5	3	5	8	+7	6	F
(North Korea) Jong Su-hyon	5	2	6	8	+11	0	F
(Hong Kong) Renee Ng	5	6	1	7	+2	6	F
(Australia) Michelle Clark-Crumpton	5	3	4	7	+7	0	F
(Australia) Lindsey Kiliwnik	5	3	4	7	+6	0	F

GP = Games played; G = Goals; A = Assists; Pts = Points; +/− = Plus/Minus; PIM = Penalties in Minutes; POS = Position
Source: IIHF.com

==== Goaltending leaders ====
Only the top five goaltenders, based on save percentage, who have played at least 40% of their team's minutes, are included in this list.

Player	TOI	GA	GAA	SA	Sv%	SO
(Hong Kong) Keira Mok	209:43	5	1.43	140	96.43	1
(North Korea) Jo Kum-hyang	125:00	2	0.96	53	96.23	0
(North Korea) Ri Pom	180:00	2	0.67	34	94.12	1
(Australia) Olivia Last	185:00	3	0.97	49	93.88	1
(Turkey) Erva Kanat	217:57	8	2.20	92	91.30	0

TOI = time on ice (minutes:seconds); SA = shots against; GA = goals against; GAA = goals against average; Sv% = save percentage; SO = shutouts
Source: IIHF.com

=== Awards ===
Position	Player
Goaltender	(Turkey) Erva Kanat
Defenceman	(Australia) Matilda Pethrick
Forward	(North Korea) Jong Su-hyon
