= 2018 IIHF Women's World Championship Division II =

Series of international ice hockey tournaments

Tournament details
- Host countries: Slovenia; Spain; Bulgaria
- Venues: 3 (in 3 host cities)
- Dates: 31 March – 6 April 2018; 17–23 March 2018; 4–9 December 2017
- Teams: 17

The 2018 IIHF Women's World Championship Division II consisted of three international ice hockey tournaments organized by the International Ice Hockey Federation. Division II A, Division II B and Division II B Qualification represent the fourth, fifth and sixth tier of the IIHF Women's World Championship.

The Netherlands won the Division II Group A tournament and will play in Division I next year. Spain took home the top spot in the Division II Group B tournament and were promoted to Division II Group A for next year, while Croatia won the Division II Group B Qualification tournament.

Similar to last year, there are no relegations to lower divisions this year either.

== Division II Group A ==
2018 IIHF Women's World Championship Division II A

Tournament details
- Host country: Slovenia
- City: Maribor
- Venue: 1 (in 1 host city)
- Dates: 31 March – 6 April 2018
- Teams: 6

Tournament statistics
- Games played: 15
- Goals scored: 82 (5.47 per game)
- Attendance: 5,784 (386 per game)
- Scoring leader: (Netherlands) Julie Zwarthoed (11 points)

Official website
- www.iihf.com

The Division II Group A tournament was played in Maribor, Slovenia, from 31 March to 6 April 2018.

=== Participating teams ===
Team	Qualification
Netherlands	Placed 2nd in Division II A last year.
Great Britain	Placed 3rd in Division II A last year.
North Korea	Placed 4th in Division II A last year.
Slovenia	Hosts; placed 5th in Division II A last year.
Australia	Placed 6th in Division II A last year.
Mexico	Placed 1st in Division II B last year and were promoted.

=== Match officials ===
4 referees and 7 linesmen were selected for the tournament.

Referees

- (Russia) Darja Abrosimova
- (United States) Kaylen Erchul
- (Finland) Anniina Nurmi
- (Austria) Ulrike Winklmayr

Linesmen

- (Sweden) Liv Andersson
- (Canada) Jennifer Berezowski
- (Hungary) Zita Gebora
- (Indonesia) Catherine Goutama
- (Russia) Anastasiia Kurashova
- (Finland) Milla Ronkainen
- (China) Wang Hui

=== Final standings ===
Pos	Team	Pld	W	OTW	OTL	L	GF	GA	GD	Pts	Promotion
1	Netherlands	5	5	0	0	0	24	3	+21	15	Promoted to the 2019 Division I B
2	Great Britain	5	4	0	0	1	17	7	+10	12	
3	North Korea	5	3	0	0	2	14	15	−1	9	
4	Australia	5	2	0	0	3	10	17	−7	6	
5	Slovenia (H)	5	1	0	0	4	14	15	−1	3	
6	Mexico	5	0	0	0	5	3	25	−22	0	

Source: IIHF
Rules for classification: 1) points; 2) head-to-head points; 3) head-to-head goal difference; 4) head-to-head number of goals scored; 5) result against closest best-ranked team outside tied teams; 6) result against second-best ranked team outside tied teams; 7) seeding before tournament.
(H) Host

=== Match results ===
All times are local (Central European Summer Time – UTC+2).

31 March 2018; 13:00	Great Britain	5–1 (0–0, 0–1, 5–0)	Australia	Ledna Dvorana, Maribor; Attendance: 370

Game reference

Samantha Bolwell
Goalies
Michelle Coonan
Referee:
(Austria) Ulrike Winklmayr
Linesmen:
(Indonesia) Catherine Goutama
(Finland) Mila Ronkainen

	0–1	38:25 – Clark-Crumpton (Horrocks)
Hill (Ganney) – 46:58	1–1
Taylor (Lewis) – 49:07	2–1
Taylor (Allen) – 50:49	3–1
Ganney (Lane) – 52:04	4–1
Ganney – 54:32	5–1

14 min
Penalties
14 min
30
Shots
31

31 March 2018; 16:30	North Korea	2–5 (1–2, 0–0, 1–3)	Netherlands	Ledna Dvorana, Maribor; Attendance: 372

Game reference

Ri Pom
Goalies
Lisa Daams
Referee:
(Russia) Darja Abrosimova
Linesmen:
(Hungary) Zita Gebora
(China) Wang Hui

	0–1	05:46 – Van Nes (Barbier)
Kim Un-h. (Kim H.) – 05:56	1–1
	1–2	11:10 – Even (Wortel, Huisman)
	1–3	41:38 – Hamers (Tjin-a-Ton)
Ryo (Kim K.) (PP) – 43:37	2–3
	2–4	53:55 – Schollaardt (Huisman, Dijkema)
	2–5	55:06 – Haverkorn (Van Nes, Milders)

6 min
Penalties
12 min
11
Shots
41

31 March 2018; 20:00	Mexico	0–6 (0–2, 0–2, 0–2)	Slovenia	Ledna Dvorana, Maribor; Attendance: 400

Game reference

Mónica Renteria
Goalies
Pia Dukarič
Referee:
(United States) Kaylen Erchul
Linesmen:
(Canada) Jennifer Berezowski
(Russia) Anastasiia Kurashova

0–1	08:04 – Lončar (PP)
0–2	15:53 – Confidenti
0–3	27:09 – Confidenti (Pren)
0–4	31:35 – Pren (Confidenti)
0–5	55:05 – Confidenti (Pren)
0–6	58:02 – Pazlar (SH)

6 min
Penalties
6 min
23
Shots
31

1 April 2018; 13:00	Great Britain	3–1 (1–0, 1–1, 1–0)	North Korea	Ledna Dvorana, Maribor; Attendance: 356

Game reference

Nicole Jackson
Goalies
Ri Pom
Referee:
(Finland) Anniina Nurmi
Linesmen:
(Canada) Jennifer Berezowski
(Hungary) Zita Gebora

Ganney (Lane, Herbert) – 17:43	1–0
Taylor (Allen, Henry) – 25:14	2–0
	2–1	29:12 – Kim Un-h. (Kim H., Jong Su.)
Farman (Lane, Henry) – 45:59	3–1

2 min
Penalties
6 min
24
Shots
14

1 April 2018; 16:30	Australia	4–1 (3–0, 1–1, 0–0)	Mexico	Ledna Dvorana, Maribor; Attendance: 348

Game reference

Michelle Coonan
Goalies
Mónica Renteria
Referee:
(United States) Kaylen Erchul
Linesmen:
(Sweden) Liv Andersson
(Russia) Anastasiia Kurashova

Padjen – 03:19	1–0
Padjen (Kiliwnik) – 06:13	2–0
Kiliwnik (Cochrane, Godfrey) (PP) – 11:06	3–0
Harvey – 22:18	4–0
	4–1	39:40 – Chávez (Téllez, J. Rojas) (PP)

10 min
Penalties
10 min
41
Shots
8

1 April 2018; 20:00	Netherlands	2–1 (1–0, 1–0, 0–1)	Slovenia	Ledna Dvorana, Maribor; Attendance: 450

Game reference

Nadia Zijlstra
Goalies
Pia Dukarič
Referee:
(Russia) Darja Abrosimova
Linesmen:
(Finland) Milla Ronkainen
(China) Wang Hui

Barbier (Zwarthoed, Wielenga) – 09:56	1–0
Hamers (Zwarthoed) (PP) – 25:12	2–0
	2–1	51:16 – Confidenti (Duh, Pren) (PP)

12 min
Penalties
14 min
55
Shots
12

3 April 2018; 13:00	Netherlands	6–0 (2–0, 1–0, 3–0)	Australia	Ledna Dvorana, Maribor; Attendance: 344

Game reference

Lisa Daams
Goalies
Michelle Coonan
Referee:
(Austria) Ulrike Winklmayr
Linesmen:
(Canada) Jennifer Berezowski
(Indonesia) Catherine Goutama

Zwarthoed (Even) (SH) – 10:07	1–0
Schollaardt (Huisman, Hamers) – 13:52	2–0
Tjin-a-Ton (Wielenga) (PP) – 32:54	3–0
Barbier (Zwarthoed, Even) – 42:27	4–0
Van der Zande (Huisman) – 47:12	5–0
Wielenga (Zwarthoed, Barbier) – 48:08	6–0

4 min
Penalties
8 min
45
Shots
12

3 April 2018; 16:30	Great Britain	5–0 (1–0, 2–0, 2–0)	Mexico	Ledna Dvorana, Maribor; Attendance: 357

Game reference

Samantha Bolwell
Goalies
Mónica Renteria
Daniela Castro
Referee:
(Finland) Anniina Nurmi
Linesmen:
(Sweden) Liv Andersson
(Finland) Milla Ronkainen

Lane (Hill, Taylor) (PP) – 13:28	1–0
Ashton (Hutchinson) – 25:32	2–0
Allen (Hill, Ganney) (PP) – 31:16	3–0
Henry (Gale) (PP) – 41:19	4–0
Adams (Bloom) – 43:10	5–0

6 min
Penalties
12 min
56
Shots
5

3 April 2018; 20:00	North Korea	5–4 (2–0, 1–2, 2–2)	Slovenia	Ledna Dvorana, Maribor; Attendance: 499

Game reference

Ri Pom
So Jong-sim
Goalies
Pia Dukarič
Referee:
(United States) Kaylen Erchul
Linesmen:
(Hungary) Zita Gebora
(Russia) Anastasiia Kurashova

Kim H. (Jong Su., Jin) – 09:21	1–0
Kim H. (Jong Su., Kim Un-h.) – 11:26	2–0
	2–1	27:57 – E. Dukarič (Confidenti, Pren)
	2–2	31:40 – Confidenti (Porekar, Pren)
Kim H. (Choe J.) – 35:03	3–2
	3–3	41:10 – Pren (Confidenti)
Kim H. (Choe J.) – 50:27	4–3
Kim Un-h. (Jong Su.) (PP) – 53:55	5–3
	5–4	58:58 – Kraner (Pren, E. Dukarič) (PP)

4 min
Penalties
4 min
52
Shots
16

4 April 2018; 13:00	Mexico	0–7 (0–1, 0–3, 0–3)	Netherlands	Ledna Dvorana, Maribor; Attendance: 341

Game reference

Mónica Renteria
Daniela Castro
Goalies
Nadia Zijlstra
Referee:
(Finland) Anniina Nurmi
Linesmen:
(Hungary) Zita Gebora
(Finland) Milla Ronkainen

0–1	02:17 – Wielenga (Barbier, Zwarthoed)
0–2	26:42 – Dijkema (Huisman, Hamers) (PP)
0–3	27:57 – Zwarthoed
0–4	30:14 – Tjin-a-Ton (Noe, Van Nes)
0–5	40:44 – Zwarthoed (Noe, Wielenga)
0–6	47:07 – Wielenga (Barbier)
0–7	54:35 – Zwarthoed (Wielenga, Hamers)

6 min
Penalties
2 min
4
Shots
52

4 April 2018; 16:30	Australia	1–3 (0–0, 1–0, 0–3)	North Korea	Ledna Dvorana, Maribor; Attendance: 340

Game reference

Ashleigh Brown
Goalies
Ri Pom
Referee:
(Russia) Darja Abrosimova
Linesmen:
(Russia) Anastasiia Kurashova
(China) Wang Hui

Clark-Crumpton (Horrocks, Van der Wolf) – 28:09	1–0
	1–1	41:23 – Ryo (Kim Un-j., Hwang S.)
	1–2	55:49 – Kim Un-h. (Kim H., Jong Su.)
	1–3	58:37 – Jin (ENG)

8 min
Penalties
2 min
20
Shots
33

4 April 2018; 20:00	Slovenia	1–4 (0–1, 0–2, 1–1)	Great Britain	Ledna Dvorana, Maribor; Attendance: 462

Game reference

Pia Dukarič
Goalies
Nicole Jackson
Referee:
(Austria) Ulrike Winklmayr
Linesmen:
(Sweden) Liv Andersson
(Indonesia) Catherine Goutama

	0–1	16:45 – Hill (Cornford)
	0–2	21:56 – Henry (Gale, Taylor)
	0–3	24:50 – Taylor (Allen, Henry)
	0–4	48:11 – Herbert (Hutchinson)
Confidenti (Pren) – 54:24	1–4

4 min
Penalties
6 min
16
Shots
51

6 April 2018; 13:00	North Korea	3–2 (1–1, 1–0, 1–1)	Mexico	Ledna Dvorana, Maribor; Attendance: 332

Game reference

Ri Pom
Goalies
Mónica Renteria
Referee:
(Russia) Darja Abrosimova
Linesmen:
(Indonesia) Catherine Goutama
(Russia) Anastasiia Kurashova

	0–1	11:11 – G. Rojas
Kim H. (Jin, Choe J.) – 13:44	1–1
Kim Un-h. (Jong Su.) – 35:48	2–1
Kim Un-h. (Jin, Kim H.) (PP) – 58:32	3–1
	3–2	59:58 – Càrdenas (Téllez, Chávez)

2 min
Penalties
10 min
30
Shots
19

6 April 2018; 16:30	Netherlands	4–0 (0–0, 3–0, 1–0)	Great Britain	Ledna Dvorana, Maribor; Attendance: 377

Game reference

Nadia Zijlstra
Goalies
Nicole Jackson
Referee:
(United States) Kaylen Erchul
Linesmen:
(Canada) Jennifer Berezowski
(Finland) Milla Ronkainen

Wielenga (Hamers, Zwarthoed) (PP) – 21:06	1–0
Hamers (Wielenga) – 26:47	2–0
Zwarthoed (Wielenga, Milders) – 39:17	3–0
Van Nes (Milders, Hamers) (PP) – 40:35	4–0

12 min
Penalties
14 min
28
Shots
19

6 April 2018; 20:00	Slovenia	2–4 (0–4, 2–0, 0–0)	Australia	Ledna Dvorana, Maribor; Attendance: 436

Game reference

Pia Dukarič
Goalies
Michelle Coonan
Referee:
(Finland) Anniina Nurmi
Linesmen:
(Sweden) Liv Andersson
(China) Wang Hui

	0–1	08:23 – Tihema (SH)
	0–2	11:18 – Tihema (Godfrey)
	0–3	13:21 – Ayris (Matheson)
	0–4	15:02 – Clark-Crumpton (Sammons)
Manfreda (E. Dukarič, Pren) (PP) – 26:49	1–4
E. Dukarič (Pren, Confidenti) – 34:11	2–4

6 min
Penalties
18 min
20
Shots
40

=== Awards and statistics ===
==== Awards ====
- Best players selected by the directorate:
  - Best Goalkeeper: (Slovenia) Pia Dukarič
  - Best Defenseman: (Netherlands) Kayleigh Hamers
  - Best Forward: (Slovenia) Pia Pren

Source: IIHF.com

==== Scoring leaders ====
List shows the top skaters sorted by points, then goals.

Player	GP	G	A	Pts	+/−	PIM	POS
(Netherlands) Julie Zwarthoed	5	5	6	11	+13	2	F
(Slovenia) Pia Pren	5	2	9	11	+5	2	F
(Slovenia) Sara Confidenti	5	6	4	10	+5	4	F
(Netherlands) Savine Wielenga	5	4	6	10	+11	2	F
(North Korea) Kim Hyang-mi	5	5	4	9	+5	0	F
(North Korea) Kim Un-hyang	5	6	1	7	+6	4	F
(Netherlands) Kayleigh Hamers	5	3	4	7	+5	0	D
(United Kingdom) Angela Taylor	5	4	2	6	+4	4	F
(Netherlands) Zoe Barbier	5	2	4	6	+10	0	F
(North Korea) Jong Su-hyon	5	0	6	6	+5	2	F

GP = Games played; G = Goals; A = Assists; Pts = Points; +/− = Plus/minus; PIM = Penalties in minutes; POS = Position
Source: IIHF.com

==== Leading goaltenders ====
Only the top five goaltenders, based on save percentage, who have played at least 40% of their team's minutes, are included in this list.

Player	TOI	GA	GAA	SA	Sv%	SO
(United Kingdom) Samantha Bolwell	120:00	1	0.50	36	97.22	1
(Netherlands) Nadia Zijlstra	180:00	1	0.33	35	97.14	2
(Slovenia) Pia Dukarič	299:45	15	3.00	221	93.21	1
(Netherlands) Lisa Daams	120:00	2	1.00	23	91.30	1
(United Kingdom) Nicole Jackson	180:00	6	2.00	58	89.66	0

TOI = Time on Ice (minutes:seconds); SA = Shots against; GA = Goals against; GAA = Goals against average; Sv% = Save percentage; SO = Shutouts
Source: IIHF.com

== Division II Group B ==
2018 IIHF Women's World Championship Division II B

Tournament details
- Host country: Spain
- City: Valdemoro
- Venue: 1 (in 1 host city)
- Dates: 17–23 March 2018
- Teams: 6

Tournament statistics
- Games played: 15
- Goals scored: 132 (8.8 per game)
- Attendance: 3,458 (231 per game)
- Scoring leader: (New Zealand) Caitlin Heale (15 points)

Official website
- www.iihf.com

The Division II Group B tournament was played in Valdemoro, Spain, from 17 to 23 March 2018.

=== Participating teams ===
Team	Qualification
Spain	Hosts; placed 2nd in Division II B last year.
New Zealand	Placed 3rd in Division II B last year.
Iceland	Placed 4th in Division II B last year.
Turkey	Placed 5th in Division II B last year.
Romania	Placed 6th in Division II B last year.
Chinese Taipei	Placed 1st in Division II B Qualification last year and were promoted.

=== Match officials ===
4 referees and 7 linesmen were selected for the tournament.

Referees

- (Latvia) Sintija Čamāne
- (Canada) Lisa Grison
- (Norway) Elise Harbitz-Rasmussen
- (China) Liu Chunhua

Linesmen

- (Austria) Bettina Angerer
- (Spain) Alba Calero
- (United States) Jennifer Cameron
- (Spain) Claudia de la Pompa
- (China) Fu Zhennan
- (Denmark) Loise Larsen
- (Finland) Linnea Sainio

=== Final standings ===
Pos	Team	Pld	W	OTW	OTL	L	GF	GA	GD	Pts	Promotion
1	Spain (H)	5	5	0	0	0	29	5	+24	15	Promoted to the 2019 Division II A
2	Chinese Taipei	5	4	0	0	1	24	16	+8	12	
3	Iceland	5	2	1	0	2	25	11	+14	8	
4	New Zealand	5	2	0	1	2	24	21	+3	7	
5	Turkey	5	1	0	0	4	17	31	−14	3	
6	Romania	5	0	0	0	5	12	47	−35	0	

Source: IIHF
Rules for classification: 1) points; 2) head-to-head points; 3) head-to-head goal difference; 4) head-to-head number of goals scored; 5) result against closest best-ranked team outside tied teams; 6) result against second-best ranked team outside tied teams; 7) seeding before tournament.
(H) Host

=== Match results ===
All times are local (Central European Time – UTC+1).

17 March 2018; 13:00	New Zealand	6–3 (0–2, 6–1, 0–0)	Romania	Francisco Fernández Ochoa City Ice Rink, Valdemoro; Attendance: 125

Game reference

Lochlyn Hyde
Goalies
Andrea Kurkó
Andreea Herescu
Referee:
(China) Liu Chunhua
Linesmen:
(Spain) Claudia de la Pompa
(Denmark) Loise Larsen

	0–1	01:32 – Oprea (Balint)
	0–2	14:45 – Dumitru (Miklós)
C. Heale (Gregory, Mulari) – 21:54	1–2
C. Heale – 26:37	2–2
C. Heale (Mulari, Gregory) (SH) – 31:38	3–2
C. Heale (Mulari, Gregory) – 33:29	4–2
	4–3	36:02 – Oprea
A. Hyde – 36:30	5–3
Mulari (Gregory, Lilly) (PP) – 39:05	6–3

8 min
Penalties
8 min
47
Shots
28

17 March 2018; 16:30	Chinese Taipei	6–2 (2–0, 2–1, 2–1)	Turkey	Francisco Fernández Ochoa City Ice Rink, Valdemoro; Attendance: 130

Game reference

Hsu Tzu-ting
Wang Yun-tzu
Goalies
Kübra Dadaşoğlu
Referee:
(Norway) Elise Harbitz-Rasmussen
Linesmen:
(Austria) Bettina Angerer
(Spain) Alba Calero

Yeh (Hsieh) – 04:37	1–0
Yeh (Hsieh) – 12:16	2–0
Yeh (Teng, Hsu Ti.) (PP) – 28:24	3–0
Yeh – 31:48	4–0
	4–1	34:53 – Yurt (Taygar, D. Lökbaş)
Yeh – 41:10	5–1
	5–2	43:18 – Demirkol (Baktıroğlu)
Yeh (Hsu Ti.) (PP) – 56:04	6–2

0 min
Penalties
6 min
58
Shots
29

17 March 2018; 20:15	Iceland	1–2 (1–0, 0–1, 0–1)	Spain	Francisco Fernández Ochoa City Ice Rink, Valdemoro; Attendance: 650

Game reference

Guðlaug Þorsteinsdóttir
Goalies
Alba Gonzalo
Referee:
(Latvia) Sintija Čamāne
Linesmen:
(United States) Jennifer Cameron
(China) Fu Zhennan

Si. Björgvinsdóttir (Ágústsdóttir) – 06:02	1–0
	1–1	21:29 – Merino (SH)
	1–2	59:11 – V. Abrisqueta

10 min
Penalties
6 min
19
Shots
34

18 March 2018; 13:00	Romania	4–9 (2–5, 1–3, 1–1)	Chinese Taipei	Francisco Fernández Ochoa City Ice Rink, Valdemoro; Attendance: 63

Game reference

Andreea Herescu
Goalies
Wang Yun-tzu
Hsu Tzu-ting
Referee:
(Canada) Lisa Grison
Linesmen:
(United States) Jennifer Cameron
(Finland) Linnea Sainio

Dumitru (Miklós) – 02:17	1–0
	1–1	04:12 – Tsai (Yao)
	1–2	13:32 – Hsieh
	1–3	14:35 – Pan (Hsu Ti.)
	1–4	15:35 – Yeh (Liu C.) (PP)
Popescu (Balló) – 16:10	2–4
	2–5	17:26 – Tao (Hsu Ti., Pan)
Voicu (Sándor) – 25:12	3–5
	3–6	31:31 – Yeh (Liu C., Teng)
	3–7	32:10 – Yeh
	3–8	39:25 – Yeh (Pan, Hsu Ti.) (PP)
	3–9	54:23 – Liu C. (Huang Y.)
Voicu – 55:07	4–9

8 min
Penalties
6 min
18
Shots
58

18 March 2018; 16:30	New Zealand	3–4 GWS (0–2, 1–0, 2–1) (OT: 0–0) (SO: 0–1)	Iceland	Francisco Fernández Ochoa City Ice Rink, Valdemoro; Attendance: 120

Game reference

Lochlyn Hyde
Goalies
Guðlaug Þorsteinsdóttir
Referee:
(Latvia) Sintija Čamāne
Linesmen:
(Spain) Alba Calero
(China) Fu Zhennan

	0–1	14:42 – Jóhannesdóttir (Shantz-Smiley) (PP)
	0–2	17:12 – Leifsdóttir (Garðarsdóttir)
Gerken (C. Heale, Mulari) – 31:31	1–2
Kloss (Shields) – 40:23	2–2
Mulari (C. Heale) (SH) – 45:39	3–2
	3–3	59:56 – Shantz-Smiley (Garðarsdóttir) (SH, EA)

Mulari (miss)
C. Heale (miss)
Shields
Kloss (miss)
Jones (miss)
Mulari
Shields (miss)
Shootout
(miss) Guðbjartsdóttir
(miss) Jóhannesdóttir
(miss) Jóhannesdóttir
(miss) Su. Björgvinsdóttir
Shantz-Smiley
Shantz-Smiley
Shantz-Smiley
18 min
Penalties
12 min
23
Shots
53

18 March 2018; 20:00	Spain	4–1 (2–1, 1–0, 1–0)	Turkey	Francisco Fernández Ochoa City Ice Rink, Valdemoro; Attendance: 530

Game reference

Alba Gonzalo
Goalies
Kübra Dadaşoğlu
Referee:
(Norway) Elise Harbitz-Rasmussen
Linesmen:
(Austria) Bettina Angerer
(Denmark) Loise Larsen

S. Danielsson (Ortiz, Muñoz) (PP) – 02:36	1–0
	1–1	05:21 – Taygar (D. Lökbaş)
Ramos (Moreno) – 10:20	2–1
Muñoz (L. Danielsson) – 39:00	3–1
S. Danielsson (Muñoz, L. Danielsson) (ENG) – 59:38	4–1

8 min
Penalties
10 min
44
Shots
19

20 March 2018; 13:00	Iceland	6–2 (1–1, 0–1, 5–0)	Turkey	Francisco Fernández Ochoa City Ice Rink, Valdemoro; Attendance: 130

Game reference

Guðlaug Þorsteinsdóttir
Goalies
Kübra Dadaşoğlu
Merve Karataş
Referee:
(China) Liu Chunhua
Linesmen:
(Spain) Alba Calero
(Finland) Linnea Sainio

	0–1	02:45 – Baktıroğlu (Demirkol, A. Lökbaş) (PP)
Jóhannesdóttir (Shantz-Smiley, Si. Björgvinsdóttir) – 13:15	1–1
	1–2	36:43 – Taygar (Baktıroğlu)
Su. Björgvinsdóttir – 40:26	2–2
Snorradóttir (Su. Björgvinsdóttir) – 42:53	3–2
Si. Björgvinsdóttir – 52:22	4–2
Garðarsdóttir (Karvelsdóttir) – 53:51	5–2
Si. Björgvinsdóttir (PP) – 55:03	6–2

10 min
Penalties
8 min
55
Shots
15

20 March 2018; 16:30	New Zealand	2–5 (0–3, 1–1, 1–1)	Chinese Taipei	Francisco Fernández Ochoa City Ice Rink, Valdemoro; Attendance: 55

Game reference

Lochlyn Hyde
Goalies
Hsu Tzu-ting
Referee:
(Canada) Lisa Grison
Linesmen:
(United States) Jennifer Cameron
(Spain) Claudia de la Pompa

	0–1	16:05 – Hsu Ti. (Tao)
	0–2	18:20 – Pan (Huang M.)
	0–3	19:44 – Yao (Lin Ye., Pan)
C. Heale (A. Hyde) – 27:19	1–3
	1–4	39:40 – Teng (Hsu Ti., Yeh) (PP)
Lilly (C. Heale, Mulari) (PP2) – 57:56	2–4
	2–5	59:04 – Hsu Ti. (SH, ENG)

6 min
Penalties
8 min
31
Shots
31

20 March 2018; 20:00	Spain	12–0 (4–0, 5–0, 3–0)	Romania	Francisco Fernández Ochoa City Ice Rink, Valdemoro; Attendance: 205

Game reference

Alba Gonzalo
Esther García
Goalies
Andrea Kurkó
Andreea Herescu
Referee:
(Latvia) Sintija Čamāne
Linesmen:
(Austria) Bettina Angerer
(China) Fu Zhennan

Muñoz (S. Danielsson, Danielsson) – 05:30	1–0
Ibañez (Moreno, Ramos) – 12:24	2–0
S. Danielsson (Muñoz, Ortiz) – 12:38	3–0
Álvarez (Muñoz) – 17:41	4–0
V. Abrisqueta (PP) – 24:01	5–0
L. Abrisqueta (Merino) (SH) – 25:02	6–0
V. Abrisqueta (Muñoz, L. Danielsson) (PP) – 28:23	7–0
Serrano (Sans) – 29:19	8–0
Ramos (Ibañez, Grande) – 30:35	9–0
Serrano (Villar, V. Abrisqueta) – 44:37	10–0
Merino (Senac Gomez) (SH) – 56:03	11–0
Álvarez (Ortiz) – 58:46	12–0

8 min
Penalties
8 min
59
Shots
14

21 March 2018; 13:00	Turkey	4–11 (3–3, 0–5, 1–3)	New Zealand	Francisco Fernández Ochoa City Ice Rink, Valdemoro; Attendance: 95

Game reference

Kübra Dadaşoğlu
Merve Karataş
Goalies
Lochlyn Hyde
Tabitha Crump
Referee:
(Norway) Elise Harbitz-Rasmussen
Linesmen:
(United States) Jennifer Cameron
(Finland) Linnea Sainio

Taygar – 00:39	1–0
	1–1	05:45 – Murray (Shields, Woodyear-Smith)
Taygar (Baktıroğlu) (PP) – 07:13	2–1
	2–2	10:33 – Murray (A. Hyde)
	2–3	11:44 – Lilly (Mulari, C. Heale) (EA)
D. Lökbaş (Baktıroğlu) – 12:30	3–3
	3–4	21:30 – Woodyear-Smith (SH)
	3–5	24:34 – Jones (Neville-Lamb) (PP)
	3–6	26:57 – C. Heale (Mulari)
	3–7	29:01 – C. Heale (Mulari, Jones)
	3–8	30:13 – Mulari (C. Heale, Jones) (PP)
	3–9	42:59 – Kloss (Jones, Mulari)
	3–10	44:59 – Gregory (Neville-Lanb, Murray)
Taygar (PP) – 47:34	4–10
	4–11	51:32 – Mulari (Gerken, C. Heale)

12 min
Penalties
6 min
19
Shots
41

21 March 2018; 16:30	Romania	1–12 (0–5, 1–2, 0–5)	Iceland	Francisco Fernández Ochoa City Ice Rink, Valdemoro; Attendance: 85

Game reference

Andreea Herescu
Andrea Kurkó
Goalies
Kristin Þorbjörnsdóttir
Referee:
(China) Liu Chunhua
Linesmen:
(Austria) Bettina Angerer
(Spain) Claudia de la Pompa

	0–1	01:06 – Jóhannesdóttir (Snorradóttir, Si. Björgvinsdóttir)
	0–2	05:25 – Ingadóttir (Ágústsdóttir) (SH)
	0–3	10:23 – Sigurðardóttir (Ingadóttir, Geirsdóttir)
	0–4	12:05 – Si. Björgvinsdóttir (Shantz-Smiley) (PP)
	0–5	15:46 – Geirsdóttir (Ingadóttir)
Oprea (Voicu) (PP) – 21:01	1–5
	1–6	26:01 – Si. Björgvinsdóttir (Su. Björgvinsdóttir) (PP2)
	1–7	33:26 – Geirsdóttir (Ágústsdóttir)
	1–8	40:09 – Geirsdóttir
	1–9	45:36 – Su. Björgvinsdóttir (Gardarsdóttir)
	1–10	48:13 – Si. Björgvinsdóttir (Jóhannesdóttir, Shantz-Smiley)
	1–11	53:30 – Si. Björgvinsdóttir (Shantz-Smiley, Su. Björgvinsdóttir) (PP)
	1–12	59:18 – Si. Björgvinsdóttir (Shantz-Smiley)

12 min
Penalties
12 min
13
Shots
59

21 March 2018; 20:00	Chinese Taipei	1–6 (0–2, 0–3, 1–1)	Spain	Francisco Fernández Ochoa City Ice Rink, Valdemoro; Attendance: 455

Game reference

Hsu Tzu-ting
Goalies
Alba Gonzalo
Esther García
Referee:
(Canada) Lisa Grison
Linesmen:
(China) Fu Zhennan
(Denmark) Loise Larsen

	0–1	12:22 – Danielsson (Muñoz, Álvarez)
	0–2	15:56 – Moreno (Merino, Ramos)
	0–3	24:20 – Martín (Senac Gomez)
	0–4	31:50 – Merino (V. Abrisqueta)
	0–5	37:04 – L. Abrisqueta (Senac Gomez, Merino)
Hsieh (Hsu Ti.) – 43:26	1–5
	1–6	51:04 – S. Danielsson (Muñoz)

6 min
Penalties
8 min
19
Shots
38

23 March 2018; 13:00	Iceland	2–4 (0–1, 1–1, 1–2)	Chinese Taipei	Francisco Fernández Ochoa City Ice Rink, Valdemoro; Attendance: 85

Game reference

Guðlaug Þorsteinsdóttir
Birta Thorbjornsdottir
Goalies
Hsu Tzu-ting
Referee:
(Latvia) Sintija Čamāne
Linesmen:
(Spain) Alba Calero
(Finland) Linnea Sainio

	0–1	02:46 – Yeh (Hsieh)
	0–2	33:46 – Teng (Yeh)
Jóhannesdóttir (Si. Björgvinsdóttir, Shantz-Smiley) – 38:31	1–2
Si. Björgvinsdóttir (Garðarsdóttir, Shantz-Smiley) (PP) – 44:31	2–2
	2–3	44:31 – Hsu Ti. (Pan) (PP)
	2–4	59:49 – Hsieh (Hsu Ti., Yeh) (PP, ENG)

10 min
Penalties
4 min
29
Shots
20

23 March 2018; 16:30	Spain	5–2 (2–0, 3–0, 0–2)	New Zealand	Francisco Fernández Ochoa City Ice Rink, Valdemoro; Attendance: 555

Game reference

Alba Gonzalo
Esther García
Goalies
Lochlyn Hyde
Referee:
(Canada) Lisa Grison
Linesmen:
(Austria) Bettina Angerer
(China) Fu Zhennan

Merino (V. Abrisqueta) – 03:07	1–0
Muñoz (SH) – 07:11	2–0
L. Abrisqueta (V. Abrisqueta) – 28:14	3–0
S. Danielsson (Muñoz) – 28:47	4–0
Ibañez (Martín, Ramos) – 35:40	5–0
	5–1	46:02 – Kloss (C. Heale, Mulari)
	5–2	58:30 – Jones (C. Heale) (PP)

16 min
Penalties
6 min
37
Shots
25

23 March 2018; 20:00	Turkey	8–4 (2–2, 1–2, 5–0)	Romania	Francisco Fernández Ochoa City Ice Rink, Valdemoro; Attendance: 175

Game reference

Kübra Dadaşoğlu
Goalies
Andrea Kurkó
Andreea Herescu
Referee:
(Norway) Elise Harbitz-Rasmussen
Linesmen:
(Spain) Claudia de la Pompa
(Denmark) Loise Larsen

	0–1	02:20 – Csiszér (Oprea)
	0–2	02:37 – Popescu (Ballo)
Baktıroğlu – 06:28	1–2
Baktıroğlu (SH) – 14:06	2–2
Baktıroğlu (SH) – 23:58	3–2
	3–3	29:33 – Popescu (Ballo) (PP)
	3–4	36:11 – Ballo (Popescu)
Taygar (Yılmaz) – 47:08	4–4
Taygar (PP) – 53:28	5–4
Baktıroğlu – 57:53	6–4
Baktıroğlu (D. Lökbaş) – 58:15	7–4
Taygar (Yılmaz, Demirkol) (PP) – 59:50	8–4

18 min
Penalties
16 min
46
Shots
30

=== Awards and statistics ===
==== Awards ====
- Best players selected by the directorate:
  - Best Goalkeeper: (Spain) Alba Gonzalo
  - Best Defenseman: (Spain) Elena Álvarez
  - Best Forward: (Iceland) Silvia Björgvinsdóttir

Source: IIHF.com

==== Scoring leaders ====
List shows the top skaters sorted by points, then goals.

Player	GP	G	A	Pts	+/−	PIM	POS
(New Zealand) Caitlin Heale	5	7	8	15	+7	2	F
(New Zealand) Anjali Thakker	5	4	11	15	+6	2	F
(Chinese Taipei) Yeh Hui-chen	5	11	3	14	+4	2	F
(Iceland) Silvia Björgvinsdóttir	5	9	3	12	+4	4	F
(Chinese Taipei) Hsu Ting-yu	5	3	8	11	+5	4	F
(Spain) Vega Muñoz	5	3	8	11	+8	2	F
(Iceland) Sarah Shantz-Smiley	5	2	9	11	+2	4	F
(Turkey) Çağla Baktıroğlu	5	6	4	10	0	4	F
(Turkey) Betül Taygar	5	8	1	9	−8	6	F
(Iceland) Flosrún Jóhannesdóttir	5	4	4	8	+1	2	F

GP = Games played; G = Goals; A = Assists; Pts = Points; +/− = Plus/minus; PIM = Penalties in minutes; POS = Position
Source: IIHF.com

==== Leading goaltenders ====
Only the top five goaltenders, based on save percentage, who have played at least 40% of their team's minutes, are included in this list.

Player	TOI	GA	GAA	SA	Sv%	SO
(Spain) Alba Gonzalo	255:04	4	0.94	87	95.40	0
(Chinese Taipei) Hsu Tzu-ting	221:23	11	2.98	118	90.68	0
(Iceland) Guðlaug Þorsteinsdóttir	224:04	9	2.41	83	89.16	0
(New Zealand) Lochlyn Hyde	295:42	20	4.06	164	87.80	0
(Turkey) Kübra Dadaşoğlu	275:47	27	5.87	201	86.57	0

TOI = Time on Ice (minutes:seconds); SA = Shots against; GA = Goals against; GAA = Goals against average; Sv% = Save percentage; SO = Shutouts
Source: IIHF.com

== Division II Group B Qualification ==
2018 IIHF Women's World Championship Division II B Qualification

Tournament details
- Host country: Bulgaria
- City: Sofia
- Venue: 1 (in 1 host city)
- Dates: 4–9 December 2017
- Teams: 5

Tournament statistics
- Games played: 10
- Goals scored: 70 (7 per game)
- Attendance: 1,366 (137 per game)
- Scoring leader: (Croatia) Ela Filipeć (16 points)

Official website
- www.iihf.com

The Division II Group B Qualification tournament was played in Sofia, Bulgaria, from 4 to 9 December 2017.

=== Participating teams ===
Team	Qualification
Belgium	Placed 2nd in Division II B Qualification last year.
South Africa	Placed 3rd in Division II B Qualification last year.
Bulgaria	Hosts; placed 4th in Division II B Qualification last year.
Hong Kong	Placed 5th in Division II B Qualification last year.
Croatia	Did not participate last year.

=== Match officials ===
3 referees and 5 linesmen were selected for the tournament.

Referees

- (Russia) Olga Steinberg
- (Sweden) Maria Fuhrberg
- (Switzerland) Michaela Matejova

Linesmen

- (Austria) Yvonne Grascher
- (Belarus) Vitaliya Khamitsevich
- (Germany) Julia Mannlein
- (Slovakia) Tatiana Kasášová
- (Turkey) Ìlksen Șermin Özdemir

=== Final standings ===
Pos	Team	Pld	W	OTW	OTL	L	GF	GA	GD	Pts	Promotion
1	Croatia	4	4	0	0	0	27	2	+25	12	Promoted to the 2019 Division II B
2	Belgium	4	3	0	0	1	26	2	+24	9	
3	South Africa	4	2	0	0	2	12	8	+4	6	
4	Hong Kong	4	1	0	0	3	4	33	−29	3	
5	Bulgaria (H)	4	0	0	0	4	3	27	−24	0	

Source: IIHF
Rules for classification: 1) points; 2) head-to-head points; 3) head-to-head goal difference; 4) head-to-head number of goals scored; 5) result against closest best-ranked team outside tied teams; 6) result against second-best ranked team outside tied teams; 7) seeding before tournament.
(H) Host

=== Match results ===
All times are local (Eastern European Time – UTC+2).

4 December 2017; 15:30	Croatia	4–0 (1–0, 3–0, 0–0)	South Africa	Winter Sports Palace, Sofia; Attendance: 75

Game reference

Petra Belobrk
Goalies
Shaylene Swanepoel
Referee:
(Switzerland) Michaela Matejova
Linesmen:
(Austria) Yvonne Grascher
(Turkey) Ìlksen Șermin Özdemir

Širanović (Vrbančić) – 09:51	1–0
Delić (Filipeć, Širanović) – 22:05	2–0
Filipeć (Širanović, Smolec) (SH) – 35:25	3–0
Bednjanec (Gurka, Filipeć) – 39:47	4–0

14 min
Penalties
10 min
29
Shots
16

4 December 2017; 19:00	Bulgaria	0–9 (0–3, 0–4, 0–2)	Belgium	Winter Sports Palace, Sofia; Attendance: 230

Game reference

Paulina Georgieva
Katrin Stankova
Goalies
Nina Van Orshaegen
Liesl Kuypers
Referee:
(Russia) Olga Steinberg
Linesmen:
(Belarus) Vitaliya Khamitsevich
(Germany) Julia Mannlein

0–1	00:07 – F. Bosmans
0–2	03:00 – Maka (Jenaer)
0–3	05:02 – L. Bosmans (PP)
0–4	24:10 – F. Bosmans (Morel de Westgaver)
0–5	27:38 – Maka
0–6	34:11 – Clincke (Frere)
0–7	35:35 – L. Bosmans (Morel de Westgaver) (PP)
0–8	41:47 – Frere (Boon) (PP)
0–9	43:28 – Franck (Frere)

12 min
Penalties
8 min
7
Shots
41

5 December 2017; 19:00	Hong Kong	0–10 (0–1, 0–5, 0–4)	Croatia	Winter Sports Palace, Sofia; Attendance: 238

Game reference

Chau Nga-sze
Goalies
Petra Belobrk
Julija Baždar
Referee:
(Sweden) Maria Fuhrberg
Linesmen:
(Slovakia) Tatiana Kasášová
(Turkey) Ìlksen Șermin Özdemir

0–1	03:34 – Gurka (Filipeć, Smolec)
0–2	22:45 – Muranić (Filipeć)
0–3	24:50 – Filipeć
0–4	36:49 – Metelko (Filipeć)
0–5	38:15 – Gurka (Smolec, Širanović)
0–6	39:30 – Malek (Muranić, Filipeć)
0–7	41:18 – Delić (Gurka, Filipeć)
0–8	49:30 – Smolec
0–9	56:08 – Delić (Filipeć)
0–10	57:17 – Malek

2 min
Penalties
8 min
3
Shots
49

6 December 2017; 15:30	Belgium	14–1 (3–0, 5–1, 6–0)	Hong Kong	Winter Sports Palace, Sofia; Attendance: 68

Game reference

Nina Van Orshaegen
Liesl Kuypers
Goalies
Chau Nga-sze
Referee:
(Switzerland) Michaela Matejova
Linesmen:
(Austria) Yvonne Grascher
(Belarus) Vitaliya Khamitsevich

F. Bosmans (Leyen) – 06:11	1–0
Boon (Clincke) – 11:35	2–0
F. Bosmans (Leyen) – 14:34	3–0
Boon (Frere) – 21:28	4–0
	4–1	24:17 – Wong
Maka (Jenaer) – 27:04	5–1
De Guchtenaere (Franck) – 29:29	6–1
Frere – 32:55	7–1
Boon (De Wolf) – 38:31	8–1
Franck (Frere) – 43:09	9–1
F. Bosmans (L. Bosmans) – 45:17	10–1
Jenaer (Van Calster) – 47:52	11–1
De Guchtenaere (Willemot) – 49:37	12–1
Jenaer (Duchateau) – 51:36	13–1
Franck (Frere) – 53:17	14–1

0 min
Penalties
4 min
61
Shots
1

6 December 2017; 19:00	South Africa	4–0 (0–0, 2–0, 2–0)	Bulgaria	Winter Sports Palace, Sofia; Attendance: 225

Game reference

Dominique Relleen
Goalies
Katrin Stankova
Referee:
(Russia) Olga Steinberg
Linesmen:
(Slovakia) Tatiana Kasášová
(Germany) Julia Mannlein

Van Doesburgh (C. Schuurman, Rhode) (PP) – 28:37	1–0
Rhode – 37:17	2–0
C. Schuurman (Van Doesburgh, N. Schuurman) – 48:26	3–0
Rhode – 56:37	4–0

14 min
Penalties
12 min
24
Shots
23

7 December 2017; 19:00	Croatia	1–0 (1–0, 0–0, 0–0)	Belgium	Winter Sports Palace, Sofia; Attendance: 80

Game reference
Petra Belobrk	Goalies	Nina Van Orshaegen	Referee: (Sweden) Maria Fuhrberg; Linesmen: (Germany) Julia Mannlein (Turkey) Ìlksen Șermin Özdemir
Filipeć (SH) – 17:23 / 1–0			Referee: (Sweden) Maria Fuhrberg; Linesmen: (Germany) Julia Mannlein (Turkey) Ìlksen Șermin Özdemir
12 min	Penalties	8 min	Referee: (Sweden) Maria Fuhrberg; Linesmen: (Germany) Julia Mannlein (Turkey) Ìlksen Șermin Özdemir
24	Shots	25	Referee: (Sweden) Maria Fuhrberg; Linesmen: (Germany) Julia Mannlein (Turkey) Ìlksen Șermin Özdemir

8 December 2017; 15:30	South Africa	8–1 (2–0, 4–1, 2–0)	Hong Kong	Winter Sports Palace, Sofia; Attendance: 68

Game reference

Shaylene Swanepoel
Goalies
Chau Nga-sze
Referee:
(Russia) Olga Steinberg
Linesmen:
(Belarus) Vitaliya Khamitsevich
(Germany) Julia Mannlein

Rhode (L. Langeveld, Brankin) (PP) – 18:38	1–0
C. Schuurman – 19:36	2–0
Jamieson (Gruber) – 21:07	3–0
	3–1	25:33 – Lau
Rhode (Brankin) – 26:04	4–1
Rhode – 35:43	5–1
C. Langeveld – 37:59	6–1
N. Schuurman (C. Schuurman) – 47:11	7–1
Rhode (Brankin, Herringer) – 56:58	8–1

6 min
Penalties
8 min
40
Shots
5

8 December 2017; 19:00	Bulgaria	2–12 (0–5, 2–3, 0–4)	Croatia	Winter Sports Palace, Sofia; Attendance: 102

Game reference

Paulina Georgieva
Goalies
Petra Belobrk
Referee:
(Switzerland) Michaela Matejova
Linesmen:
(Austria) Yvonne Grascher
(Slovakia) Tatiana Kasášová

	0–1	04:13 – Čavka (Gurka)
	0–2	05:16 – Filipeć (Metelko)
	0–3	06:57 – Delić (Gurka)
	0–4	07:15 – Smolec (Filipeć)
	0–5	16:51 – Gurka (Delić)
	0–6	24:43 – Filipeć (Bednjanec) (PP)
	0–7	26:56 – Vrbančić (Širanović) (PP)
Popova (Evstatieva, Stoyanova) (PP) – 32:16	1–7
Evstatieva (Popova) (PP) – 35:15	2–7
	2–8	36:51 – Širanović (Smolec)
	2–9	44:34 – Vrbančić (Filipeć) (PP)
	2–10	46:11 – Širanović (Filipeć)
	2–11	49:36 – Čavka (Bednjanec)
	2–12	52:39 – Čavka (Gurka)

6 min
Penalties
8 min
15
Shots
49

9 December 2017; 14:30	Hong Kong	2–1 (0–1, 0–0, 2–0)	Bulgaria	Winter Sports Palace, Sofia; Attendance: 200

Game reference

Chau Nga-sze
Goalies
Paulina Georgieva
Referee:
(Sweden) Maria Fuhrberg
Linesmen:
(Austria) Yvonne Grascher
(Belarus) Vitaliya Khamitsevich

	0–1	07:20 – Dimitrova (Georgieva, Dilova)
Ng (Shum) (PP) – 49:29	1–1
Leung – 54:26	2–1

8 min
Penalties
8 min
21
Shots
26

9 December 2017; 19:00	Belgium	3–0 (1–0, 2–0, 0–0)	South Africa	Winter Sports Palace, Sofia; Attendance: 80

Game reference

Nina van Orshaegen
Goalies
Shaylene Swanepoel
Referee:
(Switzerland) Michaela Matejova
Linesmen:
(Slovakia) Tatiana Kasášová
(Turkey) Ìlksen Șermin Özdemir

Morel de Westgaver (Van Calster, Leyen) – 19:37	1–0
F. Bosmans (Morel de Westgaver) – 29:20	2–0
Frere (Clincke) – 34:56	3–0

2 min
Penalties
4 min
22
Shots
10

=== Statistics ===
==== Scoring leaders ====
List shows the top skaters sorted by points, then goals.

Player	GP	G	A	Pts	+/−	PIM	POS
(Croatia) Ela Filipeć	4	6	10	16	+17	2	D
(Belgium) Sonja Frere	4	4	4	8	+11	0	F
(Croatia) Vesna Gurka	4	3	5	8	+11	2	F
(South Africa) Dalene Rhode	4	6	1	7	+5	0	F
(Croatia) Ana Širanović	4	3	4	7	+11	2	F
(Belgium) Femke Bosmans	4	6	0	6	+7	0	F
(Croatia) Martina Smolec	4	1	5	6	+8	2	D
(Croatia) Tijana Delić	4	4	1	4	+8	0	F
(Belgium) Axelle Franck	4	3	1	4	+4	0	F
(Belgium) Cato Boon	4	2	2	4	+6	2	F
(Belgium) Valerie Jenaer	4	2	2	4	+4	0	F
(South Africa) Chloe Schuurman	4	2	2	4	0	4	F

GP = Games played; G = Goals; A = Assists; Pts = Points; +/− = Plus/minus; PIM = Penalties in minutes; POS = Position
Source: IIHF.com

==== Leading goaltenders ====
Only the top five goaltenders, based on save percentage, who have played at least 40% of their team's minutes, are included in this list.

Player	TOI	GA	GAA	SA	Sv%	SO
(Belgium) Nina van Orshaegen	180:00	1	0.33	40	97.50	1
(Croatia) Petra Belobrk	218:12	2	0.55	57	96.49	2
(South Africa) Shaylene Swanepoel	180:00	8	2.67	56	85.71	0
(Hong Kong) Chau Nga-sze	240:00	33	8.25	176	81.25	0
(Bulgaria) Katrin Stankova	152:05	19	7.50	90	78.89	0

TOI = Time on Ice (minutes:seconds); SA = Shots against; GA = Goals against; GAA = Goals against average; Sv% = Save percentage; SO = Shutouts
Source: IIHF.com
