= 2024 Women's Ice Hockey World Championships =

Tournament details
- Host countries: United States; Austria; Latvia; Andorra; Turkey; Croatia; Estonia

Final positions
- Champions: Canada (13th title)

The 2024 Women's Ice Hockey World Championships were the 27th such series of tournaments organized by the International Ice Hockey Federation. Teams participated at several levels of competition based on their 2023 results. The competition served as qualifications for division placements in the 2025 edition.

As in 2023, teams from Russia and Belarus had not been allowed to enter, as they remained suspended by the IIHF due to the countries' invasion of Ukraine.

== Championship (Top Division) ==
The tournament was held from 3 to 14 April at Adirondack Bank Center in Utica, New York, United States.

=== Group A ===
Pos	Team	Pld	W	OTW	OTL	L	GF	GA	GD	Pts	Qualification
1	United States (H)	4	3	1	0	0	16	3	+13	11	Quarterfinals
2	Canada	4	3	0	1	0	12	2	+10	10	Quarterfinals
3	Czechia	4	2	0	0	2	10	12	−2	6	Quarterfinals
4	Finland	4	1	0	0	3	9	15	−6	3	Quarterfinals
5	Switzerland	4	0	0	0	4	3	18	−15	0	Quarterfinals

Source: IIHF
Rules for classification: 1) points; 2) head-to-head points; 3) head-to-head goal difference; 4) head-to-head number of goals scored; 5) result against closest best-ranked team outside tied teams; 6) result against second-best ranked team outside tied teams; 7) seeding before tournament.
(H) Host

=== Group B ===
Pos	Team	Pld	W	OTW	OTL	L	GF	GA	GD	Pts	Qualification or relegation
1	Germany	4	4	0	0	0	13	2	+11	12	Quarterfinals
2	Sweden	4	3	0	0	1	17	5	+12	9	Quarterfinals
3	Japan	4	1	0	1	2	8	13	−5	4	Quarterfinals
4	China	4	0	1	1	2	5	15	−10	3	Relegated to 2025 Division I
5	Denmark	4	0	1	0	3	4	12	−8	2	Relegated to 2025 Division I

Source: IIHF
Rules for classification: 1) points; 2) head-to-head points; 3) head-to-head goal difference; 4) head-to-head number of goals scored; 5) result against closest best-ranked team outside tied teams; 6) result against second-best ranked team outside tied teams; 7) seeding before tournament.

=== Knockout stage ===
Quarterfinals
11 April
A1 United States	10
B3 Japan	0
11 April
A2 Canada	5
B2 Sweden	1
11 April
A3 Czechia	1
B1 Germany	0
11 April
A4 Finland	3
A5 Switzerland	1

Semifinals
13 April
1 United States	5
4 Finland	0
13 April
2 Canada	4
3 Czechia	0

Final
14 April
1 United States	5
2 Canada (OT)	6
Third place
14 April
3 Czechia	2
4 Finland (GWS)	3

=== Final ranking ===
Pos	Grp	Team	Pld	W	OTW	OTL	L	GF	GA	GD	Pts	Final result
1	A	Canada	7	5	1	1	0	27	8	+19	18	Champions
2	A	United States (H)	7	5	1	1	0	36	9	+27	18	Runners-up
3	A	Finland	7	2	1	0	4	15	23	−8	8	Third place
4	A	Czechia	7	3	0	1	3	13	19	−6	10	Fourth place
5	A	Switzerland	6	0	1	0	5	7	23	−16	2	Fifth place game
6	B	Germany	6	4	0	1	1	15	6	+9	13	Fifth place game
7	B	Sweden	5	3	0	0	2	18	10	+8	9	
8	B	Japan	5	1	0	1	3	8	23	−15	4	
9	B	China	4	0	1	1	2	5	15	−10	3	Relegated to the 2025 Division I A
10	B	Denmark	4	0	1	0	3	4	12	−8	2	Relegated to the 2025 Division I A

Source: IIHF
(H) Host

== Division I ==
=== Group A ===
The tournament was held in Klagenfurt, Austria from 21 to 27 April 2024.

Pos	Team	Pld	W	OTW	OTL	L	GF	GA	GD	Pts	Promotion or relegation
1	Norway	5	2	3	0	0	18	6	+12	12	Promoted to the 2025 Top Division
2	Hungary	5	3	0	2	0	9	6	+3	11	Promoted to the 2025 Top Division
3	France	5	3	0	1	1	19	10	+9	10	
4	Austria (H)	5	1	2	0	2	20	15	+5	7	
5	Netherlands	5	1	0	2	2	9	15	−6	5	
6	South Korea	5	0	0	0	5	1	24	−23	0	Relegated to the 2025 Division I B

Source: IIHF
Rules for classification: 1) points; 2) head-to-head points; 3) head-to-head goal difference; 4) head-to-head number of goals scored; 5) result against closest best-ranked team outside tied teams; 6) result against second-best ranked team outside tied teams; 7) seeding before tournament.
(H) Host

=== Group B ===
The tournament was held in Riga, Latvia from 31 March to 6 April 2024.

Pos	Team	Pld	W	OTW	OTL	L	GF	GA	GD	Pts	Promotion or relegation
1	Slovakia	5	4	0	0	1	25	6	+19	12	Promoted to the 2025 Division I A
2	Latvia (H)	5	3	0	1	1	16	15	+1	10	
3	Italy	5	3	0	0	2	13	8	+5	9	
4	Great Britain	5	2	0	1	2	8	14	−6	7	
5	Slovenia	5	1	1	0	3	10	16	−6	5	
6	Poland	5	0	1	0	4	6	19	−13	2	Relegated to the 2025 Division II A

Source: IIHF
Rules for classification: 1) points; 2) head-to-head points; 3) head-to-head goal difference; 4) head-to-head number of goals scored; 5) result against closest best-ranked team outside tied teams; 6) result against second-best ranked team outside tied teams; 7) seeding before tournament.
(H) Host

== Division II ==
=== Group A ===
The tournament was held in Canillo, Andorra from 7 to 13 April 2024.

Pos	Team	Pld	W	OTW	OTL	L	GF	GA	GD	Pts	Promotion or relegation
1	Kazakhstan	5	5	0	0	0	28	9	+19	15	Promoted to the 2025 Division I B
2	Spain	5	4	0	0	1	25	6	+19	12	
3	Mexico	5	3	0	0	2	13	9	+4	9	
4	Chinese Taipei	5	2	0	0	3	8	11	−3	6	
5	Iceland	5	1	0	0	4	9	23	−14	3	
6	Belgium	5	0	0	0	5	6	31	−25	0	Relegated to the 2025 Division II B

Source: IIHF
Rules for classification: 1) points; 2) head-to-head points; 3) head-to-head goal difference; 4) head-to-head number of goals scored; 5) result against closest best-ranked team outside tied teams; 6) result against second-best ranked team outside tied teams; 7) seeding before tournament.

=== Group B ===
The tournament was held in Istanbul, Turkey from 1 to 7 April 2024.

Pos	Team	Pld	W	OTW	OTL	L	GF	GA	GD	Pts	Promotion or relegation
1	North Korea	5	4	1	0	0	30	4	+26	14	Promoted to the 2025 Division II A
2	Australia	5	4	0	1	0	31	4	+27	13	
3	Hong Kong	5	2	0	0	3	10	10	0	6 (Note: Hong Kong 3 Pts, +1 GD, New Zealand 3 Pts, 0 GD; Turkey 3 Pts, − 1 GD)	
4	New Zealand	5	2	0	0	3	18	12	+6	6	
5	Turkey (H)	5	2	0	0	3	13	17	−4	6	
6	South Africa	5	0	0	0	5	1	56	−55	0	Relegated to the 2025 Division III A

Source: IIHF
Rules for classification: 1) points; 2) head-to-head points; 3) head-to-head goal difference; 4) head-to-head number of goals scored; 5) result against closest best-ranked team outside tied teams; 6) result against second-best ranked team outside tied teams; 7) seeding before tournament.
(H) Host

== Division III ==
=== Group A ===
The tournament was held in Zagreb, Croatia from 11 to 17 March 2024.

Pos	Team	Pld	W	OTW	OTL	L	GF	GA	GD	Pts	Promotion or relegation
1	Ukraine	5	4	1	0	0	28	8	+20	14	Promoted to the 2025 Division II B
2	Romania	5	4	0	0	1	20	11	+9	12	
3	Lithuania	5	2	1	0	2	15	11	+4	8	
4	Serbia	5	2	0	1	2	12	19	−7	7	
5	Croatia (H)	5	1	0	1	3	10	16	−6	4	
6	Bulgaria	5	0	0	0	5	5	25	−20	0	Relegated to the 2025 Division III B

Source: IIHF
Rules for classification: 1) points; 2) head-to-head points; 3) head-to-head goal difference; 4) head-to-head number of goals scored; 5) result against closest best-ranked team outside tied teams; 6) result against second-best ranked team outside tied teams; 7) seeding before tournament.
(H) Host

=== Group B ===
The tournament was held in Kohtla-Järve, Estonia from 24 to 29 March 2024.

Pos	Team	Pld	W	OTW	OTL	L	GF	GA	GD	Pts	Promotion
1	Thailand	4	4	0	0	0	20	1	+19	12	Promoted to the 2025 Division III A
2	Estonia (H)	4	2	1	0	1	10	4	+6	8	
3	Israel	4	2	0	0	2	7	11	−4	6	
4	Singapore	4	1	0	1	2	8	11	−3	4	
5	Bosnia and Herzegovina	4	0	0	0	4	8	26	−18	0	

Source: IIHF
Rules for classification: 1) points; 2) head-to-head points; 3) head-to-head goal difference; 4) head-to-head number of goals scored; 5) result against closest best-ranked team outside tied teams; 6) result against second-best ranked team outside tied teams; 7) seeding before tournament.
(H) Host
