= 2025 IIHF Women's World Championship Division II =

Tournament details
- Host countries: Poland; New Zealand
- Venues: 2 (in 2 host cities)
- Dates: 7–13 April; 14–20 April
- Teams: 12

The 2025 IIHF Women's World Championship Division II consisted of two international ice hockey tournaments of the 2025 Women's Ice Hockey World Championships organised by the International Ice Hockey Federation (IIHF).

Group A was held in Bytom, Poland from 7 to 13 April and Group B held in Dunedin, New Zealand, from 14 to 20 April 2025.

== Group A tournament ==
2025 IIHF Women's World Championship Division II A

Tournament details
- Host country: Poland
- Venue: 1 (in 1 host city)
- Dates: 7–13 April
- Teams: 6

Tournament statistics
- Games played: 15
- Goals scored: 85 (5.67 per game)
- Attendance: 4,180 (279 per game)
- Scoring leader: (Poland) Karolina Późniewska (10 points)

Official website
- Website

=== Participants ===
Team	Qualification
Poland	Host, placed 6th in 2024 Division I B and was relegated.
Spain	Placed 2nd in 2024 Division II A.
Mexico	Placed 3rd in 2024 Division II A.
Chinese Taipei	Placed 4th in 2024 Division II A.
Iceland	Placed 5th in 2024 Division II A.
North Korea	Placed 1st in 2024 Division II B and was promoted.

=== Match officials ===
Four referees and seven linesmen were selected for the tournament.

Referees	Linesmen
(Canada) Béatrice Fortin; (Czech Republic) Gabriela Malá; (Slovakia) Michaela Matejová; (United States) Tippy Hill	(Canada) Alannah Beres; (Czech Republic) Alice Zábršová; (Finland) Aino Ranki; (Germany) Julia Strube; (Italy) Anna Callovini; (Spain) Alba Calero; (Switzerland) Michele Müller

=== Standings ===
Pos	Team	Pld	W	OTW	OTL	L	GF	GA	GD	Pts	Promotion or relegation
1	Spain	5	4	0	1	0	23	6	+17	13	Promoted to the 2026 Division I B
2	Poland (H)	5	4	0	0	1	30	8	+22	12	
3	Iceland	5	3	1	0	1	12	8	+4	11	
4	Chinese Taipei	5	1	1	0	3	8	20	−12	5	
5	North Korea	5	0	1	0	4	5	19	−14	2 (Note: Mexico 1–2 North Korea)	
6	Mexico	5	0	0	2	3	7	24	−17	2	Relegated to the 2026 Division II B

Source: IIHF
Rules for classification: 1) points; 2) head-to-head points; 3) head-to-head goal difference; 4) head-to-head number of goals scored; 5) result against closest best-ranked team outside tied teams; 6) result against second-best ranked team outside tied teams; 7) seeding before tournament.
(H) Host

=== Results ===
All times are local (UTC+2).

7 April 2025; 13:00	Spain	2–3 GWS (0–1, 1–0, 1–1) (OT: 0–0) (SO: 0–1)	Iceland	Bytom Arena, Bytom; Attendance: 150

Game reference

Carolina Moreno
Goalies
Andrea Bachmann
Referee:
(Czech Republic) Gabriela Malá
Linesmen:
(Italy) Anna Callovini
(Germany) Julia Strube

	0–1	11:29 – Su. Björgvinsdóttir (Magnúsdóttir, Snorradóttir) (PP)
Bosch (Castellanos, Aizpurua) – 27:51	1–1
Scilipoti (Fernández, Castellanos) (PP) – 47:31	2–1
	2–2	58:38 – Leifsdóttir (Blöndal, Kjartansdóttir) (EA)

Scilipoti (miss)
Castellanos (miss)
Fernández (miss)
Bosch (miss)
Muñoz (miss)
Shootout
(miss) Agustsdóttir
(miss) Magnúsdóttir
(miss) Si. Björgvinsdóttir
(miss) Su. Björgvinsdóttir
Blöndal
14 min
Penalties
12 min
37
Shots
33

7 April 2025; 16:30	Mexico	2–8 (0–2, 1–6, 1–0)	Poland	Bytom Arena, Bytom; Attendance: 312

Game reference

Miranda de Antuñano
Goalies
Agata Kosińska
Referee:
(Canada) Béatrice Fortin
Linesmen:
(Spain) Alba Calero
(Finland) Aino Ranki

	0–1	05:08 – Zielińska (Onyshchenko, Dziwok)
	0–2	06:07 – Brzezińska (Czarnecka)
	0–3	22:21 – Nosal (Kot)
	0–4	27:19 – Górska (Strzelecka) (SH)
	0–5	29:18 – Późniewska (Sikorska)
J. Rojas (G. Rojas) – 29:56	1–5
	1–6	31:33 – Talanda (Późniewska)
	1–7	35:54 – Sikorska (Talanda, Późniewska)
	1–8	37:47 – Kędra
Nevárez (P. Rosales) – 43:58	2–8

8 min
Penalties
14 min
14
Shots
49

7 April 2025; 20:00	North Korea	1–2 (0–0, 0–0, 1–2)	Chinese Taipei	Bytom Arena, Bytom; Attendance: 50

Game reference

Ri Pom
Goalies
Hsu Tzu-ting
Referee:
(United States) Tippy Hill
Linesmen:
(Canada) Alannah Beres
(Switzerland) Michelle Müller

	0–1	41:46 – Chung
Pak C. (Kim K., Jang) – 46:29	1–1
	1–2	55:15 – Tan (Lin Ya., Chang En-n.) (PP)

4 min
Penalties
2 min
42
Shots
28

8 April 2025; 13:00	Iceland	3–2 (1–1, 0–1, 2–0)	North Korea	Bytom Arena, Bytom; Attendance: 110

Game reference

Andrea Bachmann
Goalies
Jo Kum-hyang
Referee:
(Slovakia) Michaela Matejová
Linesmen:
(Spain) Alba Calero
(Czech Republic) Alice Zábršová

Leifsdóttir (Garðarsdóttir) (PP) – 08:06	1–0
	1–1	14:50 – Pak C. (Jang)
	1–2	27:27 – Jong S. (Ryu, Jong K.)
Su. Björgvinsdóttir (Si. Björgvinsdóttir) (PP) – 46:05	2–2
Bergsdóttir (Si. Björgvinsdóttir) – 51:20	3–2

6 min
Penalties
12 min
34
Shots
18

8 April 2025; 16:30	Poland	9–2 (4–1, 3–0, 2–1)	Chinese Taipei	Bytom Arena, Bytom; Attendance: 400

Game reference

Nadia Ratajczyk
Goalies
Chung Ai
Hsu Tzu-ting
Referee:
(Canada) Béatrice Fortin
Linesmen:
(Canada) Alannah Beres
(Finland) Aino Ranki

Dziwok (Onyshchenko) – 01:22	1–0
Późniewska – 03:29	2–0
Sikorska (Talanda) (SH) – 12:58	3–0
	3–1	15:42 – Hsu Y. (Chang En-n.)
Czarnecka (Brzezińska, Łąpieś) – 19:50	4–1
Późniewska (Korkuz, Sikorska) (PP) – 21:03	5–1
Talanda (Późniewska, Sfora) – 27:58	6–1
Łapińska (Dziwok, Czarnecka) – 30:30	7–1
Łąpieś (Zielińska) – 40:25	8–1
	8–2	48:26 – Chang En-w. (Wu, Hsieh) (PP)
Dziwok (Nosal, Sfora) – 58:04	9–2

10 min
Penalties
8 min
52
Shots
13

8 April 2025; 20:00	Spain	6–0 (0–0, 3–0, 3–0)	Mexico	Bytom Arena, Bytom; Attendance: 80

Game reference

Carolina Moreno
Goalies
Mónica Rentería
Referee:
(Czech Republic) Gabriela Malá
Linesmen:
(Italy) Anna Callovini
(Switzerland) Michele Müller

P. Giménez (Bosch) – 25:44	1–0
Castellanos (Serna) – 31:39	2–0
Scilipoti (PP) – 39:06	3–0
Aizpurua (Scilipoti, Castellanos) (PP) – 41:23	4–0
Fernández (Marina, Bosch) – 57:27	5–0
P. Giménez (Ayestaran) – 59:07	6–0

10 min
Penalties
10 min
43
Shots
21

10 April 2025; 13:00	Mexico	2–3 GWS (0–1, 1–0, 1–1) (OT: 0–0) (SO: 0–1)	Chinese Taipei	Bytom Arena, Bytom; Attendance: 80

Game reference

Miranda de Antuñano
Goalies
Hsu Tzu-ting
Referee:
(Czech Republic) Gabriela Malá
Linesmen:
(Canada) Alannah Beres
(Spain) Alba Calero

Ayala (Cárdenas) – 05:25	1–0
	1–1	35:43 – Chang En-n. (Wu, Liu)
Nevárez (D. Rosales) – 41:59	2–1
	2–2	54:11 – Chang En-n. (PP)

G. Rojas
J. Rojas
Téllez (miss)
González (miss)
Heon (miss)
J. Rojas (miss)
Shootout
Hsu T.
(miss) Huang Y.
(miss) Chang En-n.
Tan
(miss) Huang M.
Chang En-w.
10 min
Penalties
6 min
28
Shots
24

10 April 2025; 16:30	Spain	4–0 (0–0, 1–0, 3–0)	North Korea	Bytom Arena, Bytom; Attendance: 85

Game reference

Alba Gonzalo
Goalies
Jo Kum-hyang
Ri Pom
Referee:
(Slovakia) Michaela Matejová
Linesmen:
(Switzerland) Michele Müller
(Germany) Julia Strube

P. Giménez (Gil) – 34:00	1–0
Aizpurua (Fernández, Álvarez) – 40:11	2–0
Fernández (Muñoz) – 42:14	3–0
Bosch – 45:27	4–0

8 min
Penalties
8 min
35
Shots
13

10 April 2025; 20:00	Poland	2–0 (0–0, 0–0, 2–0)	Iceland	Bytom Arena, Bytom; Attendance: 650

Game reference
Nadia Ratajczyk	Goalies	Andrea Bachmann	Referee: (United States) Tippy Hill; Linesmen: (Italy) Anna Callovini (Czech Republic) Alice Zábršová
Strzelecka (Łąpieś) – 54:34 / 1–0; Talanda (Późniewska) (PP) – 57:47 / 2–0			Referee: (United States) Tippy Hill; Linesmen: (Italy) Anna Callovini (Czech Republic) Alice Zábršová
2 min	Penalties	14 min	Referee: (United States) Tippy Hill; Linesmen: (Italy) Anna Callovini (Czech Republic) Alice Zábršová
47	Shots	13	Referee: (United States) Tippy Hill; Linesmen: (Italy) Anna Callovini (Czech Republic) Alice Zábršová

12 April 2025; 13:00	Iceland	5–2 (1–0, 4–0, 0–2)	Mexico	Bytom Arena, Bytom; Attendance: 60

Game reference

Andrea Bachmann
Birta Helgudóttir
Goalies
Miranda de Antuñano
Mónica Rentería
Referee:
(Slovakia) Michaela Matejová
Linesmen:
(Italy) Anna Callovini
(Finland) Aino Ranki

Blöndal (Garðarsdóttir, Leifsdóttir) (PP) – 10:30	1–0
Su. Björgvinsdóttir (Si. Björgvinsdóttir) – 32:19	2–0
Murphy (Blöndal, Björnsdóttir) – 33:15	3–0
Kjartansdóttir (Su. Björgvinsdóttir) – 35:22	4–0
Magnúsdóttir (Su. Björgvinsdóttir) – 37:24	5–0
	5–1	43:08 – J. Rojas (G. Rojas, Dziwok)
	5–2	57:03 – Chávez (Labastida)

2 min
Penalties
4 min
40
Shots
24

12 April 2025; 16:30	North Korea	0–9 (0–3, 0–4, 0–2)	Poland	Bytom Arena, Bytom; Attendance: 1,088

Game reference

Jo Kum-hyang
Goalies
Agata Kosińska-Horzelska
Katarzyna Radomska
Referee:
(Canada) Béatrice Fortin
Linesmen:
(Spain) Alba Calero
(Germany) Julia Strube

0–1	09:00 – Łapińska (Kot, Onyshchenko)
0–2	11:35 – Kot (Onyshchenko)
0–3	13:29 – Późniewska (Sikorska)
0–4	27:50 – Talanda (Późniewska)
0–5	29:18 – Brzezińska (Strzelecka, Czarnecka)
0–6	36:50 – Późniewska (Talanda)
0–7	39:22 – Łapińska (Korkuz, Onyshchenko)
0–8	40:41 – Sikorska (Talanda, Sfora)
0–9	45:17 – Łąpieś (Brzezińska, Czarnecka)

2 min
Penalties
2 min
17
Shots
46

12 April 2025; 20:00	Chinese Taipei	1–7 (0–2, 0–3, 1–2)	Spain	Bytom Arena, Bytom; Attendance: 63

Game reference

Chung Ai
Hsu Tzu-ting
Goalies
Carolina Moreno
Referee:
(United States) Tippy Hill
Linesmen:
(Switzerland) Michele Müller
(Czech Republic) Alice Zábršová

	0–1	03:40 – Gil (Fernández)
	0–2	14:11 – Bosch (Gil, Scilipoti)
	0–3	21:02 – Scilipoti (Fernández)
	0–4	30:47 – Aizpurua (Muñoz) (SH)
	0–5	32:31 – Romero (Aizpurua) (SH)
Tan (Hsu Y., Chang En-n.) (PP) – 44:18	1–5
	1–6	55:29 – Fernández (PP)
	1–7	57:15 – Castellanos (Muñoz)

4 min
Penalties
10 min
28
Shots
42

13 April 2025; 13:00	Mexico	1–2 GWS (1–1, 0–0, 0–0) (OT: 0–0) (SO: 0–1)	North Korea	Bytom Arena, Bytom; Attendance: 53

Game reference
Miranda de Antuñano	Goalies	Jo Kum-hyang	Referee: (United States) Tippy Hill; Linesmen: (Italy) Anna Callovini (Switzerland) Michele Müller
Téllez (Hagerman) – 05:46 / 1–0; / 1–1 / 10:12 – Jang (Pak C.)			Referee: (United States) Tippy Hill; Linesmen: (Italy) Anna Callovini (Switzerland) Michele Müller
Chávez (miss); G. Rojas (miss); J. Rojas; D. Rosales (miss); Heon (miss); G. Rojas (miss); J. Rojas (miss)	Shootout	(miss) Jong S. (miss) Jang; (miss) Pak C. Kim U. (miss) Pak I. (miss) Jang; Jong S.	Referee: (United States) Tippy Hill; Linesmen: (Italy) Anna Callovini (Switzerland) Michele Müller
8 min	Penalties	0 min	Referee: (United States) Tippy Hill; Linesmen: (Italy) Anna Callovini (Switzerland) Michele Müller
20	Shots	37	Referee: (United States) Tippy Hill; Linesmen: (Italy) Anna Callovini (Switzerland) Michele Müller

13 April 2025; 16:30	Chinese Taipei	0–1 (0–0, 0–0, 0–1)	Iceland	Bytom Arena, Bytom; Attendance: 57

Game reference
Hsu Tzu-ting	Goalies	Andrea Bachmann	Referee: (Canada) Béatrice Fortin; Linesmen: (Canada) Alannah Beres (Finland) Aino Ranki
0–1 / 49:45 – Garðarsdóttir (Björnsdóttir)			Referee: (Canada) Béatrice Fortin; Linesmen: (Canada) Alannah Beres (Finland) Aino Ranki
2 min	Penalties	4 min	Referee: (Canada) Béatrice Fortin; Linesmen: (Canada) Alannah Beres (Finland) Aino Ranki
10	Shots	40	Referee: (Canada) Béatrice Fortin; Linesmen: (Canada) Alannah Beres (Finland) Aino Ranki

13 April 2025; 20:15	Poland	2–4 (1–3, 0–1, 1–0)	Spain	Bytom Arena, Bytom; Attendance: 942

Game reference

Nadia Ratajczyk
Agata Kosińska-Horzelska
Goalies
Carolina Moreno
Referee:
(Czech Republic) Gabriela Malá
Linesmen:
(Germany) Julia Strube
(Czech Republic) Alice Zábršová

	0–1	02:44 – Bosch
Łapińska (Dziwok, Onyshchenko) – 05:06	1–1
	1–2	07:53 – Castellanos
	1–3	09:04 – Muñoz
	1–4	25:57 – Fernández (Gil)
Strzelecka (Sikorska) (SH) – 58:50	2–4

27 min
Penalties
4 min
29
Shots
23

=== Statistics ===
==== Scoring leaders ====
List shows the top skaters sorted by points, then goals.

Player	GP	G	A	Pts	+/−	PIM	POS
(Poland) Karolina Późniewska	5	5	5	10	+10	4	F
(Spain) Haizea Fernández	5	4	4	8	+6	0	F
(Poland) Ida Talanda	5	4	4	8	+10	0	F
(Poland) Wiktoria Sikorska	5	3	4	7	+11	2	F
(Spain) Indira Bosch	5	4	2	6	+8	0	D
(Spain) Claudia Castellanos	5	3	3	6	+5	8	F
(Poland) Tetiana Onyshchenko	5	0	6	6	+5	0	F
(Spain) Eva Aizpurua	5	3	2	5	+8	2	F
(Iceland) Sunna Björgvinsdóttir	5	3	2	5	+3	4	F
(Spain) Sofia Scilipoti	5	3	2	5	+5	8	F

GP = Games played; G = Goals; A = Assists; Pts = Points; +/− = Plus/Minus; PIM = Penalties in Minutes; POS = Position
Source: IIHF.com

==== Goaltending leaders ====
Only the top five goaltenders, based on save percentage, who have played at least 40% of their team's minutes, are included in this list.

Player	TOI	GA	GAA	SA	Sv%	SO
(Spain) Carolina Moreno	217:31	4	1.10	97	95.88	1
(Iceland) Andrea Bachmann	282:02	6	1.28	131	95.42	1
(Chinese Taipei) Hsu Tzu-ting	234:13	9	2.31	148	93.92	0
(Poland) Agata Kosińska-Horzelska	147:54	3	1.22	42	92.86	0
(Mexico) Miranda de Antuñano	230:00	16	4.17	140	88.57	0

TOI = time on ice (minutes:seconds); SA = shots against; GA = goals against; GAA = goals against average; Sv% = save percentage; SO = shutouts
Source: IIHF.com

=== Awards ===
Position	Player
Goaltender	(Iceland) Andrea Bachmann
Defenceman	(Spain) Indira Bosch
Forward	(Poland) Karolina Późniewska

== Group B tournament ==
2025 IIHF Women's World Championship Division II B

Tournament details
- Host country: New Zealand
- Venue: 1 (in 1 host city)
- Dates: 14–20 April
- Teams: 6

Tournament statistics
- Games played: 15
- Goals scored: 96 (6.4 per game)
- Attendance: 4,015 (268 per game)
- Scoring leader: (Ukraine) Valeria Manchak (17 points)

Official website
- Website

=== Participants ===
Team	Qualification
Belgium	Placed 6th in 2024 Division II A and was relegated.
Australia	Placed 2nd in 2024 Division II B.
Hong Kong	Placed 3rd in 2024 Division II B.
New Zealand	Host, placed 4th in 2024 Division II B.
Turkey	Placed 5th in 2024 Division II B.
Ukraine	Placed 1st in 2024 Division III A and was promoted.

=== Match officials ===
Four referees and seven linesmen were selected for the tournament.

Referees	Linesmen
(Poland) Joanna Pobożniak; (Sweden) Hanna Öberg; (Switzerland) Melissa Boverio; (United States) Taylor Hanvelt	(Australia) Bethany Bowshall; (Australia) Sarah Kinninment; (Canada) Melissa Brunn; (China) Li Mengjie; (Japan) Kumiko Matsuo; (New Zealand) Winifred Davis; (Slovakia) Magdaléna Jonáková

=== Standings ===
Pos	Team	Pld	W	OTW	OTL	L	GF	GA	GD	Pts	Promotion or relegation
1	Australia	5	4	1	0	0	24	4	+20	14	Promoted to the 2026 Division II A
2	New Zealand (H)	5	3	1	1	0	17	12	+5	12	
3	Ukraine	5	3	0	1	1	25	12	+13	10	
4	Belgium	5	1	0	1	3	11	21	−10	4	
5	Hong Kong	5	1	0	0	4	10	30	−20	3	
6	Turkey	5	0	1	0	4	9	17	−8	2	Relegated to the 2026 Division III A

Source: IIHF
Rules for classification: 1) points; 2) head-to-head points; 3) head-to-head goal difference; 4) head-to-head number of goals scored; 5) result against closest best-ranked team outside tied teams; 6) result against second-best ranked team outside tied teams; 7) seeding before tournament.
(H) Host

=== Results ===
All times are local (UTC+12).

14 April 2025; 13:00	Hong Kong	2–6 (1–1, 1–3, 0–2)	Belgium	Dunedin Ice Stadium, Dunedin; Attendance: 25

Game reference

Mok Hei Lam
Goalies
Charlotte Swinnen
Referee:
(United States) Taylor Hanvelt
Linesmen:
(Australia) Bethany Bowshall
(Australia) Sarah Kinninment

	0–1	06:49 – Van Hootegem (Steeno)
Smyth (Chim) – 19:01	1–1
Ip (Li) – 28:05	2–1
	2–2	33:01 – Steeno (Saunders)
	2–3	35:37 – Wagemans (Saunders)
	2–4	39:06 – Bosmans (Steeno, Saunders)
	2–5	46:43 – Paulissen (Liedts)
	2–6	56:19 – Paulissen (Van Hoof)

4 min
Penalties
2 min
32
Shots
27

14 April 2025; 16:30	Australia	2–0 (1–0, 0–0, 1–0)	Turkey	Dunedin Ice Stadium, Dunedin; Attendance: 30

Game reference
Sasha King	Goalies	Erva Kanat	Referee: (Sweden) Hanna Öberg; Linesmen: (New Zealand) Winifred Davis (Slovakia) Magdaléna Jonáková
Julien (Del Basso) – 16:34 / 1–0; Sammons (Davis Tope) – 59:48 / 2–0			Referee: (Sweden) Hanna Öberg; Linesmen: (New Zealand) Winifred Davis (Slovakia) Magdaléna Jonáková
10 min	Penalties	4 min	Referee: (Sweden) Hanna Öberg; Linesmen: (New Zealand) Winifred Davis (Slovakia) Magdaléna Jonáková
46	Shots	10	Referee: (Sweden) Hanna Öberg; Linesmen: (New Zealand) Winifred Davis (Slovakia) Magdaléna Jonáková

14 April 2025; 20:00	Ukraine	3–4 OT (0–1, 1–1, 2–1) (OT: 0–1)	New Zealand	Dunedin Ice Stadium, Dunedin; Attendance: 600

Game reference

Viktoria Tkachenko
Goalies
Grace Harrison
Referee:
(Poland) Joanna Pobożniak
Linesmen:
(Canada) Melissa Brunn
(China) Li Mengjie

	0–1	14:31 – Nelson (Mulari)
Tsymyrenko (Manchak, Telehina) – 34:33	1–1
	1–2	39:57 – Horner-Pascoe (Jones)
Tsymyrenko (Manchak) – 40:30	2–2
Telehina (Kyrychenko, Tsymyrenko) (PP) – 46:20	3–2
	3–3	49:11 – Nelson (Lilly, Jones)
	3–4	62:37 – Blong

2 min
Penalties
8 min
37
Shots
37

15 April 2025; 13:00	Australia	8–0 (2–0, 1–0, 5–0)	Hong Kong	Dunedin Ice Stadium, Dunedin; Attendance: 30

Game reference

Sasha King
Goalies
Mok Hei Lam
Referee:
(Sweden) Hanna Öberg
Linesmen:
(Canada) Melissa Brunn
(Japan) Kumiko Matsuo

Venus – 09:29	1–0
Cochrane (Dash) – 16:47	2–0
Julien – 27:02	3–0
Del Basso – 40:59	4–0
Godfrey (Venus) – 46:11	5–0
Mahoney (Aparicio) – 53:50	6–0
Mahoney (Crompton) – 57:35	7–0
Tihema – 58:49	8–0

6 min
Penalties
6 min
53
Shots
16

15 April 2025; 16:30	Turkey	1–5 (0–2, 0–0, 1–3)	Ukraine	Dunedin Ice Stadium, Dunedin; Attendance: 100

Game reference

Erva Kanat
Goalies
Yuliana Vilhan
Referee:
(United States) Taylor Hanvelt
Linesmen:
(New Zealand) Winifred Davis
(Australia) Sarah Kinninment

	0–1	02:33 – Vedmedenko (Tsymyrenko, Nesterenko)
	0–2	11:35 – Kyrychenko (Manchak, Telehina)
	0–3	40:30 – Manchak (Tsymyrenko, Kyrychenko) (PP)
Yavuz (Göksal, Savaş) (PP2) – 45:47	1–3
	1–4	55:31 – Manchak (Tsymyrenko)
	1–5	58:40 – Telehina (Tsymyrenko)

12 min
Penalties
8 min
23
Shots
56

15 April 2025; 20:00	Belgium	1–3 (0–0, 1–2, 0–1)	New Zealand	Dunedin Ice Stadium, Dunedin; Attendance: 450

Game reference

Charlotte Swinnen
Goalies
Grace Harrison
Referee:
(Switzerland) Melissa Boverio
Linesmen:
(Australia) Bethany Bowshall
(Slovakia) Magdaléna Jonáková

	0–1	26:28 – Shields (Mills, Hollyer)
	0–2	37:17 – Horner-Pascoe (Nelson, Heale)
Steeno – 37:45	1–2
	1–3	41:22 – Blong (Mulari)

6 min
Penalties
4 min
17
Shots
48

17 April 2025; 13:00	Belgium	3–4 OT (0–0, 2–2, 1–1) (OT: 0–1)	Turkey	Dunedin Ice Stadium, Dunedin; Attendance: 55

Game reference

Charlotte Swinnen
Goalies
Erva Kanat
Referee:
(Poland) Joanna Pobożniak
Linesmen:
(Australia) Bethany Bowshall
(Canada) Melissa Brunn

	0–1	27:55 – Şenyuva (Taygar)
Steeno – 28:23	1–1
	1–2	30:55 – Savaş (Taygar)
Bosmans (Steeno) – 33:13	2–2
Saunders (Paulissen) – 47:51	3–2
	3–3	56:40 — Seçen (Savaş)
	3–4	61:21 – Savaş (Yavuz) (PP)

2 min
Penalties
2 min
24
Shots
27

17 April 2025; 16:30	Australia	4–1 (1–0, 1–0, 2–1)	Ukraine	Dunedin Ice Stadium, Dunedin; Attendance: 250

Game reference

Sasha King
Goalies
Yuliana Vilhan
Referee:
(Switzerland) Melissa Boverio
Linesmen:
(New Zealand) Winifred Davis
(Japan) Kumiko Matsuo

Julien (Godfrey) – 01:22	1–0
Kiliwnik – 32:03	2–0
	2–1	40:33 – Manchak (Tsymyrenko, Telehina)
Sammons (Davis Tope, Cochrane) – 50:40	3–1
Sammons (Julien) – 57:35	4–1

6 min
Penalties
8 min
40
Shots
27

17 April 2025; 20:00	Hong Kong	2–4 (2–1, 0–0, 1–3)	New Zealand	Dunedin Ice Stadium, Dunedin; Attendance: 400

Game reference

Chau Nga Sze
Goalies
Lochlyn Hyde
Referee:
(United States) Taylor Hanvelt
Linesmen:
(Slovakia) Magdaléna Jonáková
(China) Li Mengjie

Ng – 00:18	1–0
Wong (Smyth, Ip) (PP) – 06:07	2–0
	2–1	11:36 – Hansen (Blong, Jones)
	2–2	51:18 – Blong (Mulari)
	2–3	51:45 – Gregory (Shields, Cross)
	2–4	55:16 – Blong (Mulari, Jones)

4 min
Penalties
16 min
36
Shots
41

19 April 2025; 13:00	Turkey	2–4 (2–0, 0–3, 0–1)	Hong Kong	Dunedin Ice Stadium, Dunedin; Attendance: 75

Game reference

Azra Sert
Erva Kanat
Goalies
Mok Hei Lam
Referee:
(Switzerland) Melissa Boverio
Linesmen:
(Canada) Melissa Brunn
(Japan) Kumiko Matsuo

Savaş (Yavuz, Bozbei) – 03:13	1–0
Bağcı (Çakmak, Oğuz) – 03:35	2–0
	2–1	24:12 – Cheung W. (Ip)
	2–2	25:53 – Cheung W. (Tam)
	2–3	32:40 – Smyth (Ng)
	2–4	42:11 – Ng (Smyth, Wong)

6 min
Penalties
6 min
24
Shots
31

19 April 2025; 16:30	Ukraine	6–1 (2–1, 3–0, 1–0)	Belgium	Dunedin Ice Stadium, Dunedin; Attendance: 200

Game reference

Viktoria Tkachenko
Goalies
Charlotte Swinnen
Referee:
(Sweden) Hanna Öberg
Linesmen:
(Australia) Sarah Kinninment
(China) Li Mengjie

	0–1	10:27 – Steeno (Bosmans)
Kyrychenko (Manchak, Tsymyrenko) (PP) – 11:36	1–1
Manchak (Kyrychenko, Tsymyrenko) (PP2) – 19:35	2–1
Tsymyrenko (Telehina) – 23:58	3–1
Manchak – 34:15	4–1
Manchak (Vedmedenko) – 39:52	5–1
Kyrychenko (Tsymyrenko, Manchak) – 44:23	6–1

0 min
Penalties
8 min
59
Shots
13

19 April 2025; 20:00	New Zealand	3–4 GWS (0–0, 1–3, 2–0) (OT: 0–0) (SO: 0–1)	Australia	Dunedin Ice Stadium, Dunedin; Attendance: 1,000

Game reference

Grace Harrison
Goalies
Sasha King
Referee:
(United States) Taylor Hanvelt
Linesmen:
(Australia) Bethany Bowshall
(Slovakia) Magdaléna Jonáková

Jones (Blong, Horner-Pascoe) (PP) – 24:01	1–0
	1–1	30:00 – Venus (Rapchuk) (PP)
	1–2	30:08 – Marnie Pullin (Julien)
	1–3	32:51 – Julien (del Basso)
Blong (Jones) – 43:30	2–3
Horner-Pascoe (Mulari, Jones) – 58:29	3–3

Blong (miss)
Nelson (miss)
Horner-Pascoe (miss)
Mulari (miss)
Heale (miss)
Shootout
(miss) Kiliwnik
Julien
(miss) del Basso
(miss) Crompton
6 min
Penalties
10 min
23
Shots
44

20 April 2025; 13:00	Hong Kong	2–10 (1–5, 1–2, 0–3)	Ukraine	Dunedin Ice Stadium, Dunedin; Attendance: 150

Game reference

Mok Hei Lam
Olivia Lloren
Goalies
Viktoria Tkachenko
Anna Kharvivska
Referee:
(Sweden) Hanna Öberg
Linesmen:
(New Zealand) Winifred Davis
(Slovakia) Magdaléna Jonáková

	0–1	02:09 – Nesterenko
	0–2	02:29 – Manchak
	0–3	07:30 – Kyrychenko (PP)
	0–4	10:22 – Manchak (Tsymyrenko, Vedmedenko)
Wong (Ip, Lam) – 15:37	1–4
	1–5	17:20 – Manchak (Telehina)
Wong (Ip) – 29:28	2–5
	2–6	34:48 – Manchak (Telehina, Kyrychenko) (SH)
	2–7	38:08 – Manchak (Telehina, Kyrychenko)
	2–8	43:13 – Akorokhod (Rohanova) (EN)
	2–9	53:04 – Manchak (Kyrychenko) (PP)
	2–10	56:09 – Telehina (Tsymyrenko) (PP)

6 min
Penalties
4 min
16
Shots
48

20 April 2025; 16:30	Belgium	0–6 (0–2, 0–2, 0–2)	Australia	Dunedin Ice Stadium, Dunedin; Attendance: 200

Game reference

Charlotte Swinnen
Manon Meurez
Goalies
Sasha King
Referee:
(Switzerland) Melissa Boverio
Linesmen:
(Australia) Sarah Kinninment
(Japan) Kumiko Matsuo

0–1	01:42 – Julien (Venus)
0–2	17:51 – Cochrane (Mahoney)
0–3	31:36 – Tihema (Kiliwnik, Julien) (PP)
0–4	33:16 – Rapchuk (Crompton)
0–5	49:24 – Godfrey (Crompton)
0–6	58:31 – Crompton (Mahoney, Godfrey) (PP)

6 min
Penalties
2 min
8
Shots
66

20 April 2025; 20:00	New Zealand	3–2 (0–0, 1–1, 2–1)	Turkey	Dunedin Ice Stadium, Dunedin; Attendance: 450

Game reference

Lochlyn Hyde
Goalies
Erva Kanat
Referee:
(Poland) Joanna Pobożniak
Linesmen:
(Australia) Bethany Bowshall
(China) Li Mengjie

	0–1	23:11 – Gerez (Taygar)
Blong (Mulari) – 32:08	1–1
Horner-Pascoe (Nelson) – 40:32	2–1
	2–2	42:52 – Taygar (Savaş) (PP)
Blong (Jones, Nelson) (PP) – 49:42	3–2

2 min
Penalties
8 min
50
Shots
24

=== Statistics ===
==== Scoring leaders ====
List shows the top skaters sorted by points, then goals.

Player	GP	G	A	Pts	+/−	PIM	POS
(Ukraine) Valeria Manchak	5	12	5	17	+12	0	F
(Ukraine) Dariya Tsymyrenko	5	3	11	14	+10	0	F
(Ukraine) Tetiana Kyrychenko	5	4	6	10	+12	0	D
(Ukraine) Polina Telehina	5	3	7	10	+9	10	F
(New Zealand) Katya Blong	5	7	2	9	+3	4	F
(Australia) Christina Julien	5	5	3	8	+9	2	F
(New Zealand) Jaime Jones	5	1	7	8	+7	4	D
(Belgium) Anke Steeno	5	4	3	7	+4	6	F
(Turkey) Elis Savaş	5	3	3	6	−3	8	F
(New Zealand) Anjali Mulari	5	0	6	6	+4	2	F

GP = Games played; G = Goals; A = Assists; Pts = Points; +/− = Plus/Minus; PIM = Penalties in Minutes; POS = Position
Source: IIHF.com

==== Goaltending leaders ====
Only the top five goaltenders, based on save percentage, who have played at least 40% of their team's minutes, are included in this list.

Player	TOI	GA	GAA	SA	Sv%	SO
(Australia) Sasha King	305:00	4	0.79	84	95.24	3
(New Zealand) Grace Harrison	187:37	7	2.24	97	92.78	0
(Turkey) Erva Kanat	246:10	13	3.17	175	92.57	0
(Belgium) Charlotte Swinnen	296:40	20	4.04	227	91.19	0
(Ukraine) Viktoria Tkachenko	142:37	6	2.52	54	88.89	0

TOI = time on ice (minutes:seconds); SA = shots against; GA = goals against; GAA = goals against average; Sv% = save percentage; SO = shutouts
Source: IIHF.com

=== Awards ===
Position	Player
Goaltender	(Australia) Sasha King
Defenceman	(New Zealand) Jaime Jones
Forward	(Ukraine) Valeria Manchak
