= Kim Un-hyang =

Kim Un-hyang may refer to:

- Kim Un-hyang (gymnast) (born 1990), North Korean artistic gymnast
- Kim Un-hyang (diver) (born 1991), North Korean diver
- Kim Un-hyang (ice hockey) (born 1992), North Korean ice hockey player
