= Belgium women's national ice hockey team =

Belgium
- Association: Royal Belgian Ice Hockey Federation
- General manager: Dirk Dobbelaere
- Head coach: Dale Miller
- Assistants: Kirsten Schönwetter
- Captain: Femke Bosmans
- Most games: Sibylle Morel De Westcaver (58)
- Top scorer: Lotte De Guchtenaere (35)
- Most points: Femke Bosmans (55)
- Team colors
- IIHF code: BEL

Ranking
- Current IIHF: 29 ▲1 (3 June 2026)
- Highest IIHF: 21 (2003)
- Lowest IIHF: 39 (2022)

First international
- Netherlands 5–2 Belgium (Geleen, Netherlands; 5 January 2000)

Biggest win
- Belgium 14–1 Hong Kong (Sofia, Bulgaria; 6 December 2017)

Biggest defeat
- Netherlands 13–0 Belgium (Newcastle, Australia; 3 February 2011)

World Championships
- Appearances: 21 (first in 2000)
- Best result: 20th (2000)

International record (W–L–T)
- 42–73–3

The Belgian women's national ice hockey team represents Belgium at the International Ice Hockey Federation's IIHF World Women's Championships. The women's national team is controlled by Royal Belgian Ice Hockey Federation. As of 2011, Belgium has 83 female players. The Belgian women's national team is ranked 27th in the world.

== World Championships record ==
In 2000 the Belgian team was the first time involved in the World Championship competition.

- 2000 – Finished in 20th place
- 2001 – Finished in 22nd place
- 2003 – Finished in 23rd place (3rd in Division III)
- 2004 – Finished in 25th place (4th in Division III)
- 2005 – Finished in 23rd place (3rd in Division III)
- 2007 – Finished in 24th place (3rd in Division III)
- 2008 – Finished in 25th place (4th in Division III)
- 2009 – Division III canceled
- 2011 – Finished in 25th place (6th in Division IIA, Relegated to Division IIB)
- 2012 – Finished in 31st place (5th in Division IIB)
- 2013 – Finished in 31st place (5th in Division IIB)
- 2014 – Finished in 31st place (5th in Division IIB)
- 2015 – Finished in 32nd place (6th in Division IIB, Relegated to Division IIB Qualification)
- 2017 – Finished in 34th place (2nd in Division IIB Qualification)
- 2018 – Finished in 35th place (2nd in Division IIB Qualification)
- 2019 – Finished in 36th place (2nd in Division IIB Qualification)
- 2020 – Finished in 36th place (2nd in Division III)
- 2021 – Cancelled due to the COVID-19 pandemic
- 2022 – Finished in 32nd place (1st in Division IIIA, Promoted to Division IIB)
- 2023 – Finished in 28th place (1st in Division IIB, Promoted to Division IIA)
- 2024 – Finished in 28th place (6th in Division IIA, Relegated to Division IIB)
- 2025 – Finished in 32nd place (4th in Division IIB)
- 2026 – Finished in 34th place (6th in Division IIB, Relegated to Division IIIA)

== All-time record against other nations ==
As of 14 September 2011

Team	GP	W	T	L	GF	GA
Hungary	7	5	0	2	21	16
South Africa	5	4	0	1	26	9
Romania	3	3	0	0	16	1
South Korea	3	3	0	0	10	6
Spain	2	2	0	0	6	1
Australia	4	0	1	3	6	22
Slovenia	5	0	1	4	6	26
Bavaria	1	0	0	1	3	7
Slovakia	1	0	0	1	0	8
Austria	1	0	0	1	1	10
Croatia	2	0	0	2	1	5
Italy	2	0	0	2	1	10
Great Britain	5	0	0	5	5	35
Netherlands	12	0	0	12	6	62
