= Spain women's national ice hockey team =

Ice hockey

Spain
- The coat of arms of Spain is the badge used on the players jerseys.
- Association: Spanish Ice Sports Federation
- Head coach: Juan Bravo
- Assistants: Ashley Salerno; Taylor Wasylk
- Captain: Elena Álvarez
- Most games: Elena Álvarez (77)
- Top scorer: Vega Muñoz (33)
- Most points: Vega Muñoz (68)
- Team colors
- IIHF code: ESP

Ranking
- Current IIHF: 24 (3 June 2026)
- Highest IIHF: 24 (first in 2022)
- Lowest IIHF: 35 (2011)

First international
- Bavaria 10–1 Spain (Paris, France; 21 May 2009)

Biggest win
- Spain 14–0 Ireland (Sofia, Bulgaria; 19 March 2011)

Biggest defeat
- Bavaria 10–1 Spain (Paris, France; 21 May 2009)

World Championships
- Appearances: 14 (first in 2011)
- Best result: 23rd (2025)

International record (W–L–T)
- 53–36–0

The Spain women's national ice hockey team represents Spain at the International Ice Hockey Federation's IIHF World Women's Championships. The women's national team is controlled by Spanish Ice Sports Federation. As of 2011, Spain has 63 female players. The Selección Nacional Femenina de Hockey is ranked 35th in the world.

== History ==
The Selección Nacional Femenina de Hockey had their debut at an international event at Cergy in France, where they lost the event's opening match on 21 May 2009 against a Bavarian selection, with a score of 1–10. They also celebrated their first victory on the same day, beating the Lady Panthers Grefrath 4–0. Their first match against another national team at that event was their match against Belgium on 22 May 2009, which they lost 1–3.

In 2009 the Selección Nacional Femenina de Hockey was the first time involved in the World Championship competition but the 2009 World Women's Championship Division V did not play. The tournament was cancelled. The reasons seem to be multiple. No country wanted to assume the financial costs of the tournament.

The Spanish national team had their World Championship debut at the 2011 Women's World Ice Hockey Championships, where they were scheduled to meet the Bulgarian, Irish, Polish and Turkish national teams in the Division V event in Sofia from 14 to 20 March 2011.

- 15 March: Spain 7–0 Turkey
- 16 March: Spain 7–0 Bulgaria
- 18 March: Poland 5–4 Spain
- 19 March: Spain 14–0 Ireland

== Olympic record ==
The Spain Women hockey team has never qualified for an Olympic tournament.

== World Championship record ==
Year	Division		Position		GP	W	D	L
Year	Tier	Div.	Ov	Div.	GP	W	D	L
2009	4	Div IV	Cancelled					
2011	5	Div V	32	2	4	3	0	1
2012	5	Div II B	27	2	5	4	0	1
2013	5	Div II B	28	2	5	4	0	1
2014	5	Div II B	29	3	5	3	0	2
2015	5	Div II B	29	3	5	3	0	2
2016	5	Div II B	28	2	5	4	0	1
2017	5	Div II B	28	2	5	4	0	1
2018	5	Div II B	28	1	5	5	0	0
2019	4	Div II A	25	3	5	3	0	2
2020	4	Div II A	Cancelled due to the COVID-19 pandemic					
2021	4	Div II A	Cancelled due to the COVID-19 pandemic					
2022	4	Div II A	24	4	1	1	0	2
2023	4	Div II A	24	2	4	3	0	1
2024	4	Div II A	24	2	5	4	0	1
2025	4	Div II A	23	1	5	4	1	0
2026	3	Div I B	22	6	5	1	0	4
