= Anjali Mulari =

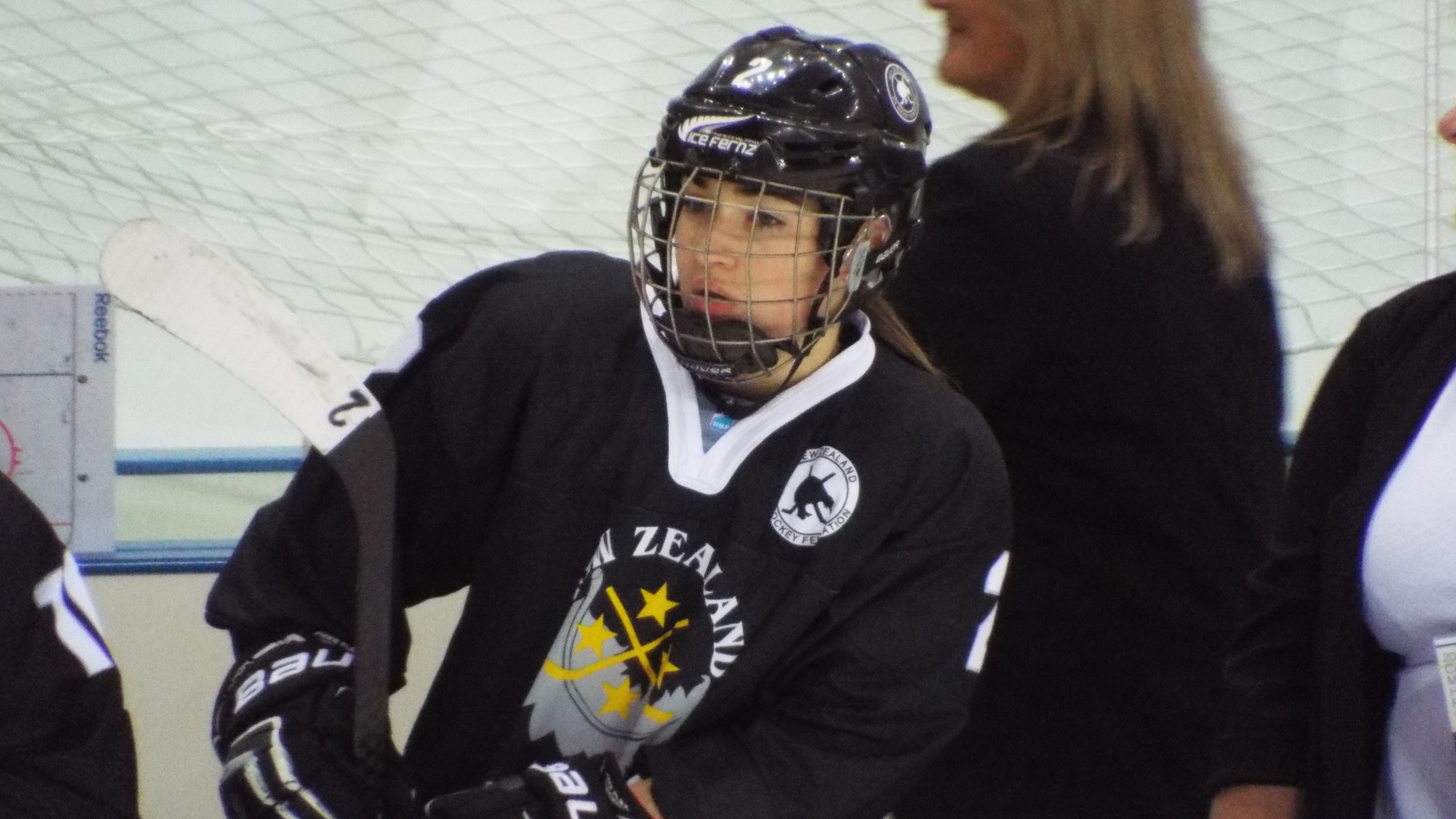
- Born: 20 August 1993 (age 33)
- Height: 5 ft 2 in (157 cm)
- Weight: 132 lb (60 kg; 9 st 6 lb)
- Position: Forward
- Shoots: Right
- team Former teams: Hamilton Devils; Aranda de Duero (Liga Élite)
- National team: New Zealand
- Playing career: 2005–present
- Website: anjali.nz
Medal record
Women's inline hockey
Representing New Zealand
FIRS Women's Inline Hockey World Championship
Bronze medal – third place	2013 United States	Team

Anjali Dayalji Mulari (née Thakker) (born 20 August 1993) is a New Zealand ice hockey forward and inline hockey player. She is the Captain of the New Zealand women's national ice hockey team, Auckland Steel Ice Hockey Team and the Hamilton Devils Inline Hockey Team. Her previous teams include CHL Aranda de Duero of the Spanish Senior Women's Liga Elite, Ris-Orangis in France and Köping in Sweden.

== Early life ==
Mulari was born to a Kiwi mother and an Indian father, and grew up in Hamilton. She began playing inline hockey at the age of 11, when she attended Fairfield Intermediate School. She graduated from Hillcrest High School when she was 17 years old. Mulari was a Sir Edmund Hillary Scholar at the University of Waikato and graduated in 2014 with a Bachelor of Science major in Biochemistry. Her two-years-older brother Sanjay Thakker has also represented New Zealand in inline hockey, and studied at the same university.

== Inline hockey playing career ==
=== Hamilton Devils ===
She joined the Hamilton Devils in 2005 in the U12 programme and was selected as the team captain in 2006. Mulari led her team to the gold medal at the New Zealand National Championships. In 2011 aged 18 she was chosen as the alternate captain of the senior team and led her team to gold in the national championships, a feat repeated in 2012 and 2013 followed by a silver medal in 2014, with Mulari wearing the captain's C on her jersey. Still the Captain, Mulari led the Devils to yet another New Zealand Championship in 2016.

=== Les Phénix Ris-Orangis ===
Following a brief stay in England for the 2015–16 season, Mulari signed to play for Ris-Orangis in the French Women's Elite league playing two games in which she scored 12 points.

=== CHL Aranda de Duero ===
In December 2015 the Spanish Elite league's bottom club CHLAD from Aranda de Duero signed Mulari for an undisclosed sum. After 4 games in CHLAD, Mulari scored 10 goals making her the league's 2nd top scorer and CHLAD have climbed from the bottom spot and away from the relegation zone.

=== Köping Inline ===
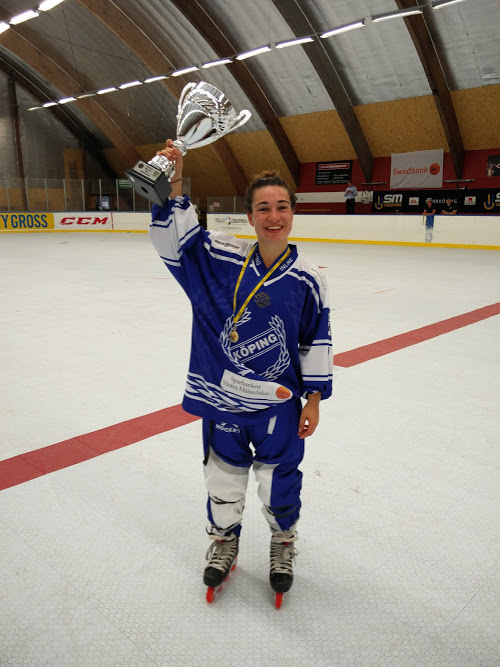
Anjali Mulari Swedish Inline Hockey Champion 2016

The Swedish Köping Inline declared their intention to win both men and women's Swedish Championship in 2016 and made a number of high-profile signings to reach that goal and Mulari joined Köping's women's team for the finals during SM-veckan inline hockey finals 2016 in Norrköping. Mulari scored all 3 goals in their first game securing a 3–1 win for Köping. In the championship final against Wermland, Mulari scored the fastest hat trick in Swedish history taking just 2 minutes and 9 seconds to net three unanswered goals at the start of the first period. The game ended in an 8–4 Köping victory with Mulari scoring 7 out of the 8 Köping goals.

== Ice hockey playing career ==
=== Auckland Steel ===
After just a few months of starting ice hockey, Mulari was selected in the Auckland women's representative team in 2010. The team has since won four national titles from 2010 to 2013. In 2013 Mulari was alternate captain.

Mulari once again gained a leadership position in Auckland Steel for the 2016–17 season. She led Auckland to an undefeated season and broke all player records in the process with her 70 points over the 12-game season.

=== Melbourne Ice ===
In August 2014, Mulari signed to Melbourne Ice for the 2014–15 season. Melbourne Ice compete in the Australian Women's Ice Hockey League (AWIHL). Mulari assisted the team in lifting the Joan McKowen Memorial Trophy for the third consecutive year in 2015. Mulari finished sixth in the scoring leaders for the league, with 8 goals and 8 assists from 12 games played.

== International ==
Mulari began her international inline hockey career in 2008 with the New Zealand Junior Women's National Team in the Oceania Inline Hockey Championships and continued to impress at the AAU Junior Olympics in 2010 where Thakker was the top scorer. She has featured in the New Zealand women's national team every year since she was 17 and captained the team at the 2015 NARCh tournament.

She was again chosen into the New Zealand national team in 2016

Despite her young age, Mulari is one of the most capped female ice hockey players in New Zealand having represented New Zealand Ice Fernz every year since 2011.

=== IIHF Ice Hockey Women's World Championship 2016 ===
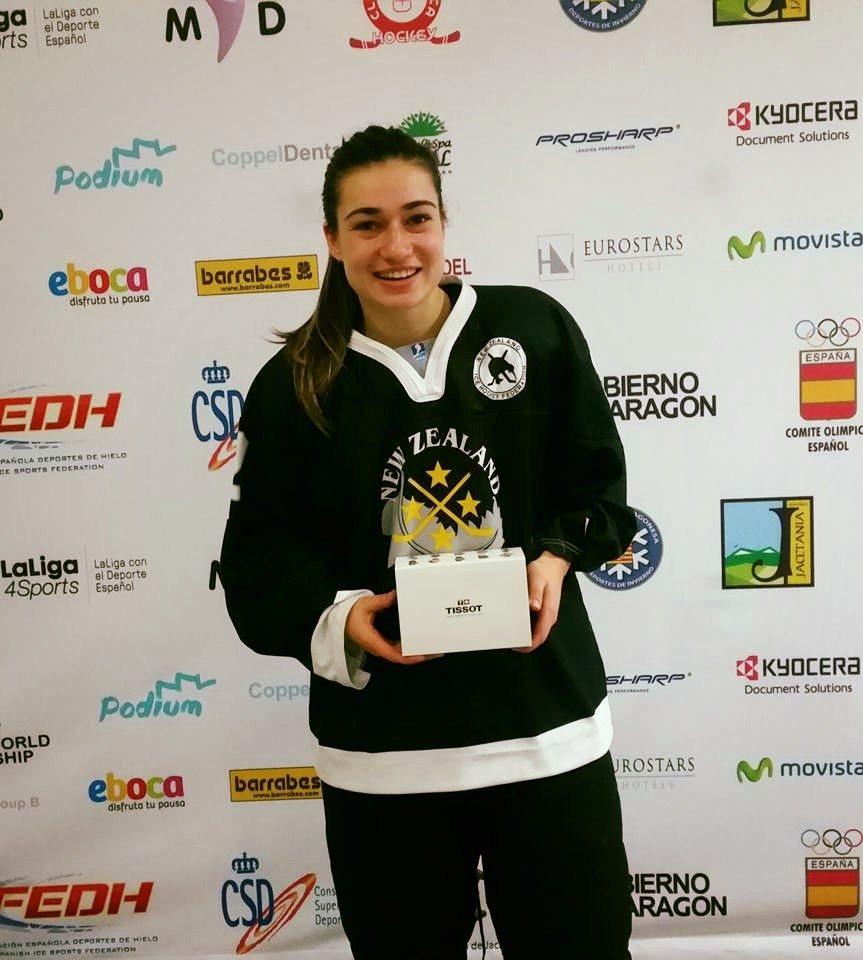
Anjali Mulari selected as the Best Player for Team NZL at the 2016 IIHF Ice Hockey Women's World Championship Division 2 Group B.

Selected early into the 2016 New Zealand women's national ice hockey team, Mulari had an international break-through tournament at the 2016 ice hockey world championship finals finishing second in goals and in points for the whole tournament scoring more than half of all New Zealand goals (7 out of 13) and either scoring or assisting all New Zealand goals in all but one game in the tournament. Her performance saw Mulari selected as the Best Player for Team New Zealand and she was awarded the coveted IIHF Tissot watch.

=== IIHF Ice Hockey Women's World Championship 2017 ===
Following her break-through season in 2016, Mulari was selected as the Alternate Captain of the 2017 Ice Fernz at the IIHF Ice Hockey Women's World Championship 2017 tournament in Akureyri, Iceland. Thakker proved once again her value for Team New Zealand by scoring or assisting 15 of New Zealand's 20 goals in the tournament thus being responsible for 75% of the team's offensive output.

Mulari dominated the tournament in every key statistic for skaters. Mulari scored the most goals (7), had the most assists (8), most points (15) and best +/- (+9) record of all players in the tournament.

Mulari's dominance saw her win the top individual prize of the tournament, the Most Valuable Forward trophy.

=== IIHF Ice Hockey Women's World Championship 2023 ===
After a break to start a family, Anjali Mulari was again selected to represent New Zealand at the 2023 IIHF Women's World Championship in Cape Town, South Africa. In New Zealand's first game of the tournament against Croatia, Mulari broke the New Zealand national team record for most points in a game by scoring a goal and adding 7 assists. Mulari finished the tournament with 11 points from 4 games. She topped the tournament's assist table and was the only Top 10 points scorer from Team New Zealand.

== Awards and honours ==
- Sir Peter Blake Trust Dream Team Leader
- Duffy Books in Homes Role Model
- Most Valuable Forward, IIHF World Championship 2017
- Top Scorer at Swedish Inline Hockey Championships 2016
- University of Auckland Blues Award 2016
- Best Player Team New Zealand, IIHF World Championship 2023
- Best Player Team New Zealand, IIHF World Championship 2016
- University of Waikato Sporting Blues Award 2011–14
- Sir Edmund Hillary Scholarship
- New Zealand University Blues Award 2012
- NARCh Fastest Skater Award 2015
- Top Sniper New Zealand National Skills Competition 2014
