= Jong Su-hyon =

North Korean ice hockey player (born 1996)

- Born: 10 October 1996 (age 29) North Korea
- Height: 160 cm (5 ft 3 in)
- Weight: 58 kg (128 lb; 9 st 2 lb)
- Position: Forward
- Shoots: Left
- National team: North Korea and Korea
- Playing career: 2015–present

Jong Su-hyon (born 10 October 1996) is a North Korean ice hockey player. She competed in the 2018 Winter Olympics.

== Career ==
Alongside South Korean Park Jong-ah, Jong was the penultimate torchbearer at the 2018 Winter Olympics opening ceremony.

She competed in the Olympics as part of a unified team of 35 players drawn from both North and South Korea. The team's coach was Sarah Murray and the team was in Group B competing against Switzerland, Japan and Sweden.
