= Kim Un-hyang (ice hockey) =

North Korean ice hockey player (born 1992)

- Born: 10 December 1992 (age 32) North Korea
- Height: 157 cm (5 ft 2 in)
- Weight: 59 kg (130 lb; 9 st 4 lb)
- Position: Forward
- Shoots: Right
- National team: North Korea and Korea
- Playing career: 2013–present

Kim Un-hyang (Korean: 김은향; born 10 December 1992) is a North Korean ice hockey player.

== Career ==
She competed in the 2018 Winter Olympics as part of a unified team of 35 players drawn from both North and South Korea. The team's coach was Sarah Murray and the team was in Group B competing against Switzerland, Japan and Sweden.
