= 2012 IIHF Women's World Championship Division II =

International ice hockey competition

Tournament details
- Host countries: Slovenia; South Korea
- Venues: 2 (in 2 host cities)
- Dates: 25–31 March 2012; 10–16 March 2012
- Teams: 12

The 2012 IIHF Women's World Championship Division II consisted of two international ice hockey tournaments organized by the International Ice Hockey Federation. Division II A and Division II B represent the fourth and fifth tier of the IIHF Women's World Championship.

Previously, these tournaments were known as Division III and Division IV.

== Division II Group A ==
2012 IIHF Women's World Championship Division II A
Tournament details
- Host country: Slovenia
- City: Maribor
- Venue: 1 (in 1 host city)
- Dates: 25–31 March 2012
- Teams: 6

Tournament statistics
- Matches played: 15
- Goals scored: 93 (6.2 per match)

The Division II Group A tournament was played in Maribor, Slovenia, from 25 to 31 March 2012. The winners, North Korea, were promoted to Division I B for 2013, while the bottom-ranked team, Croatia, were relegated to Division II B for 2013.

=== Participating teams ===
Team	Qualification
North Korea	placed 6th in Division II last year and were relegated
Australia	placed 2nd in Division III last year
Hungary	placed 3rd in Division III last year
Slovenia	hosts; placed 4th in Division III last year
Croatia	placed 5th in Division III last year
New Zealand	placed 1st in Division IV last year and were promoted

=== Final standings ===
Pos	Team	Pld	W	OTW	OTL	L	GF	GA	GD	Pts	Promotion or relegation
1	North Korea	5	5	0	0	0	33	7	+26	15	Promoted to the 2013 Division I B
2	Hungary	5	4	0	0	1	26	6	+20	12	
3	Australia	5	3	0	0	2	11	12	−1	9	
4	New Zealand	5	2	0	0	3	12	23	−11	6	
5	Slovenia (H)	5	0	1	0	4	7	18	−11	2	
6	Croatia	5	0	0	1	4	4	27	−23	1	Relegated to the 2013 Division II B

Source: IIHF
(H) Host

=== Match results ===
All times are local (Central European Summer Time – UTC+2).

25 March 2012; 13:00	Australia	0–3 (0–1, 0–1, 0–1)	Hungary	Tabor Ice Hall; Attendance: 342

Game reference

Ashleigh Brown
Goalies
Aniko Nemeth
Referee:
(Japan) Miyuki Nakayama
Linesmen:
(Sweden) Veronica Johansson
(Austria) Ulrike Winklmayr

0–1	18:39 – A. Huszak (M. Molnar) (PP)
0–2	24:37 – N. Brgles (Z. Jokai-Szilagyi, D. Medgyes)
0–3	54:15 – A. Huszak (SH)

8 min
Penalties
12 min
23
Shots
32

25 March 2012; 16:30	Croatia	1–4 (0–1, 1–3, 0–0)	New Zealand	Tabor Ice Hall; Attendance: 361

Game reference

Petra Belobrk
Goalies
Tereza Houkal
Referee:
(United States) Kristine Langley
Linesmen:
(Slovakia) Jana Habanova
(Hungary) Zsuzsanna Sandor

	0–1	16:08 – J. Horner-Pascoe (T. Tissink, R. Gottgtroy)
	0–2	22:20 – A. Hobbs (B. Gibbings, A. Cunningham) (PP2)
E. Filipec (M. Klanac) (SH) – 23:10	1–2
	1–3	24:05 – A. Thakker (R. Gottgtroy)
	1–4	28:10 – A. Cunningham (Z. Pielak-Jones)

8 min
Penalties
31 min
23
Shots
18

25 March 2012; 20:00	North Korea	3–1 (1–1, 2–0, 0–0)	Slovenia	Tabor Ice Hall; Attendance: 410

Game reference

Ri Hye-Yong
Goalies
Hedvika Korbar
Referee:
(Finland) Kaisa Ketonen
Linesmen:
(Germany) Lisa Huffner
(Canada) Vanessa Stratton

	0–1	01:49 – P. Pren
Ryu H. (Ri S.) – 17:05	1–1
Han S. (Jin O., Kim U.) – 20:50	2–1
O C. (Han S.) – 28:06	3–1

4 min
Penalties
10 min
51
Shots
14

26 March 2012; 13:00	Australia	3–0 (1–0, 0–0, 2–0)	Croatia	Tabor Ice Hall; Attendance: 334

Game reference

Kristy Bruske
Goalies
Petra Belobrk
Referee:
(Finland) Kaisa Ketonen
Linesmen:
(Sweden) Veronica Johansson
(Hungary) Zsuzsanna Sandor

G. Moore (R. Padjen, N. Farrier) – 11:05	1–0
A. del Basso (A. Steranko, S. Green) (PP) – 44:12	2–0
S. Crompton (A. Steranko) – 47:11	3–0

10 min
Penalties
12 min
38
Shots
20

26 March 2012; 16:30	Hungary	4–5 (3–1, 1–2, 0–2)	North Korea	Tabor Ice Hall; Attendance: 355

Game reference

Aniko Nemeth
Goalies
Hong Kum-Sil
Referee:
(United States) Kristine Langley
Linesmen:
(Czech Republic) Jana Habanova
(Russia) Elena Ivanova

A. Huszak (F. Kiss-Simon) (SH) – 03:06	1–0
	1–1	08:16 – Han S. (Jin O.) (PP)
F. Kiss-Simon (A. Ronai) (PP2) – 10:20	2–1
A. Huszak – 19:42	3–1
	3–2	29:18 – Ri S. (Ryu H.)
A. Huszak (F. Gasparics) – 33:46	4–2
	4–3	39:14 – Ryu H. (Kim S.)
	4–4	46:57 – Ryu H. (SH)
	4–5	55:42 – Kim K. (Ryu H., Ri S.)

16 min
Penalties
14 min
28
Shots
21

26 March 2012; 20:00	New Zealand	4–3 (1–0, 2–1, 1–2)	Slovenia	Tabor Ice Hall; Attendance: 410

Game reference

Tereza Koukal
Goalies
Hedvika Korbar
Referee:
(Russia) Yana Zueva
Linesmen:
(Germany) Lisa Huffner
(Canada) Vanessa Stratton

S. Haslemore (K. Langford) – 12:17	1–0
K. Langford (PP2) – 26:03	2–0
	2–1	36:13 – P. Pren
B. Gibbings (A. Goulding) – 38:07	3–1
A. Thakker (J. Horner-Pascoe) (PP) – 51:03	4–1
	4–2	51:20 – P. Pren (L. Deisinger)
	4–3	55:45 – P. Pren

16 min
Penalties
2 min
23
Shots
18

28 March 2012; 13:00	North Korea	11–1 (3–1, 3–0, 5–0)	Croatia	Tabor Ice Hall; Attendance: 323

Game reference

Ri Hye Yong
Goalies
Petra Belobrk
Referee:
(Japan) Miyuki Nakayama
Linesmen:
(Germany) Lisa Huffner
(Canada) Vanessa Stratton

Ri O. (Ryu H.) – 04:56	1–0
Jin O. – 12:50	2–0
Ri S. – 15:42	3–0
	3–1	19:30 – D. Kruselj Posavec (M. Klanac)
Ro-S. – 24:01	4–1
Han S. (Jin O., Kim S.) (PP) – 33:49	5–1
Ri S. (Ri O., Kim U.) – 35:58	6–1
Won C. (Ri S.) – 44:58	7–1
Ri U. (Ro S.) – 45:15	8–1
Ro S. – 50:03	9–1
Ri O. (Kim K.) – 52:38	10–1
Kim S. (Ro S.) – 55:16	11–1

4 min
Penalties
6 min
55
Shots
8

28 March 2012; 16:30	Australia	7–2 (3–2, 2–0, 2–0)	New Zealand	Tabor Ice Hall; Attendance: 365

Game reference

Ashleigh Brown
Goalies
Tereza Houkal
Lyndal Heineman
Referee:
(Russia) Yana Zueva
Linesmen:
(Hungary) Zsuzsanna Sandor
(Austria) Ulrike Winklmayr

A. Steranko – 07:31	1–0
S. Godfrey – 08:55	2–0
	2–1	09:53 – A. Thakker (B. Gibbings)
A. Steranko – 15:54	3–1
	3–2	16:30 – J. Horner-Pascoe
A. del Basso – 25:50	4–2
G. Moore – 31:35	5–2
A. del Basso (A. Steranko) – 45:34	6–2
A. del Basso (S. Lehmann) – 53:28	7–2

16 min
Penalties
12 min
30
Shots
16

28 March 2012; 20:00	Hungary	8–0 (4–0, 1–0, 3–0)	Slovenia	Tabor Ice Hall; Attendance: 415

Game reference

Aniko Nemeth
Boglarka Gegesy
Goalies
Ines Confidenti
Referee:
(United States) Kristine Langley
Linesmen:
(Slovakia) Jana Habanova
(Russia) Elena Ivanova

Z. Jokai-Szilagyi (N. Brgles) – 05:07	1–0
Z. Jokai-Szilagyi (F. Kiss-Simon) – 13:12	2–0
Z. Jokai-Szilagyi (T. Horvath) – 16:51	3–0
D. Medgyes (N. Brgles) (K. Trencsenyi) – 17:26	4–0
F. Gasparics (T. Horvath, F. Kiss-Simon) – 36:53	5–0
A. Huszak (F. Gasparics) (SH) – 49:15	6–0
K. Trencsenyi (D. Medgyes, N. Brgles) (PP) – 51:10	7–0
A. Huszak (F. Gasparics, M. Molnar) – 59:51	8–0

6 min
Penalties
12 min
53
Shots
13

29 March 2012; 13:00	New Zealand	1–7 (0–2, 1–3, 0–2)	North Korea	Tabor Ice Hall; Attendance: 325

Game reference

Tereza Houkal
Lyndal Heineman
Goalies
Ri Hye Yong
Referee:
(Japan) Miyuki Nakayama
Linesmen:
(Slovakia) Jana Habanova
(Russia) Elena Ivanova

	0–1	11:56 – Kim S. (Ro S.)
	0–2	13:46 – Kim U. (O C., Kim S.) (PP)
B. Gibbings (A. Cunningham) – 22:45	1–2
	1–3	22:54 – Ryu H. (Ri S., Ri O.)
	1–4	27:34 – O C.
	1–5	31:44 – Kim U. (Jin O.)
	1–6	40:11 – Ri O. (Ri S.)
	1–7	56:06 – Ri S. (Kim U.)

8 min
Penalties
6 min
13
Shots
27

29 March 2012; 16:30	Croatia	0–6 (0–3, 0–1, 0–2)	Hungary	Tabor Ice Hall; Attendance: 340

Game reference

Petra Belobrk
Goalies
Boglarka Gegesy
Referee:
(Russia) Yana Zueva
Linesmen:
(Canada) Vanessa Statton
(Austria) Ulrike Winklmayr

0–1	02:50 – T. Horvath (F. Kiss-Simon)
0–2	07:26 – R. Dabasi (N. Brgles)
0–3	11:00 – K. Trencsenyi
0–4	39:52 – R. Dabasi (A. Kiss)
0–5	48:27 – T. Horvath (F. Gasparics) (PP)
0–6	53:41 – F. Kiss-Simon (PP)

10 min
Penalties
8 min
19
Shots
49

29 March 2012; 20:00	Slovenia	0–1 (0–1, 0–0, 0–0)	Australia	Tabor Ice Hall; Attendance: 412

Game reference
Hedvika Korbar	Goalies	Kristy Bruske	Referee: (Finland) Kaisa Ketonen; Linesmen: (Sweden) Veronica Johansson (Hungary) Zsuzsanna Sandor
0–1 / 06:30 – A. Steranko (A. del Basso)			Referee: (Finland) Kaisa Ketonen; Linesmen: (Sweden) Veronica Johansson (Hungary) Zsuzsanna Sandor
10 min	Penalties	14 min	Referee: (Finland) Kaisa Ketonen; Linesmen: (Sweden) Veronica Johansson (Hungary) Zsuzsanna Sandor
18	Shots	42	Referee: (Finland) Kaisa Ketonen; Linesmen: (Sweden) Veronica Johansson (Hungary) Zsuzsanna Sandor

31 March 2012; 13:00	Hungary	5–1 (1–0, 3–0, 1–1)	New Zealand	Tabor Ice Hall; Attendance: 335

Game reference

Aniko Nemeth
Boglarka Gegesy
Goalies
Tereza Houkal
Referee:
(Finland) Kaisa Ketonen
Linesmen:
(Sweden) Veronica Johansson
(Austria) Ulrike Winklmayr

T. Horvath (F. Gasparics, A. Huszak) – 03:29	1–0
A. Ronai (Z. Jokai-Szilagyi) – 25:21	2–0
F. Gasparics (T. Horvath, A. Huszak) – 27:16	3–0
A. Huszak (T. Horvath) (PP) – 33:00	4–0
L. Pinter (Dabasi) – 42:34	5–0
	5–1	42:46 – S. Haslemore

4 min
Penalties
18 min
55
Shots
10

31 March 2012; 16:30	North Korea	7–0 (4–0, 0–0, 3–0)	Australia	Tabor Ice Hall; Attendance: 358

Game reference

Ri Hye Yong
Goalies
Ashleigh Brown
Kristy Bruske
Referee:
(United States) Kristine Langley
Linesmen:
(Germany) Lisa Huffner
(Canada) Vanessa Stratton

Ri S. (Ri O., Kim K.) – 09:15	1–0
Ri S. (Kim U.) – 11:08	2–0
Won C. (Ri S.) – 11:29	3–0
Kim U. (Han S., Jin O.) – 14:36	4–0
O C. (Han S., Jin O.) – 43:58	5–0
Ri S. – 52:56	6–0
Ri O. (Ri S., Ryu H.) – 57:57	7–0

10 min
Penalties
8 min
40
Shots
27

31 March 2012; 20:00	Slovenia	3–2 GWS (1–1, 0–0, 1–1) (OT: 0–0) (SO: 1–0)	Croatia	Tabor Ice Hall; Attendance: 480

Game reference

Hedvika Korbar
Goalies
Petra Belobrk
Referee:
(Russia) Yana Zueva
Linesmen:
(Slovakia) Jana Habanova
(Russia) Elena Ivanova

L. Deisinger (T. Lepir) (PP2) – 06:23	1–0
	1–1	16:37 – A. Kadijevic
	1–2	47:25 – E. Filipec
P. Pren (L. Deisinger) – 47:33	2–2

S. Zimsek (miss)
P. Pren (miss)
T. Lahajnar (miss)
I. Kraner (miss)
P. Pren (miss)
P. Pren (miss)
P. Pren
Shootout
(miss) M. Smolec
(miss) A. Kadijevic
(miss) A. Siranovic
(miss) M. Smolec
(miss) A. Kadijevic
(miss) M. Smolec
(miss) A. Kadijevic
16 min
Penalties
18 min
28
Shots
30

=== Statistics and awards ===
==== Scoring leaders ====
Pos	Player	Country	GP	G	A	Pts	+/−	PIM
1	Ri Sol-gyong	North Korea	5	7	7	14	+17	4
2	Alexandra Huszák	Hungary	5	8	2	10	+12	2
3	Ryu Hyon-mi	North Korea	5	4	4	8	+12	4
4	Ri Ok-yong	North Korea	5	4	3	7	+13	6
5	Tifani Horváth	Hungary	5	3	4	7	+6	2
5	Kim Un-ae	North Korea	5	3	4	7	+7	0
7	Fanni Gasparics	Hungary	5	2	5	7	+11	2
8	Jin Ok	North Korea	4	6	0	6	+1	2
9	Pia Pren	Slovenia	5	5	2	7	+8	26
10	Han Song-hui	North Korea	5	3	3	6	+7	2
10	Andrea Steranko	Australia	5	3	3	6	+4	4

GP = Games played; G = Goals; A = Assists; Pts = Points; +/− = Plus–minus; PIM = Penalties In Minutes

Source: IIHF.com

==== Goaltending leaders ====
(minimum 40% team's total ice time)

Pos	Player	Country	TOI	GA	GAA	Sv%	SO
1	Boglárka Gegesy	Hungary	120:00	1	0.50	96.77	1
2	Kristy Bruske	Australia	168:31	4	1.42	94.20	2
3	Ri Hye-yong	North Korea	269:40	5	1.11	93.90	1
4	Hedvika Korbar	Slovenia	243:58	10	2.46	93.15	0
5	Anikó Németh	Hungary	179:00	5	1.68	90.91	1

TOI = Time on ice (minutes:seconds); GA = Goals against; GAA = Goals against average; Sv% = Save percentage; SO = Shutouts

Source: IIHF.com

==== Directorate Awards ====
- Goaltender: Kristy Bruske, Australia
- Defenseman: Kim Un-ae, North Korea
- Forward: Alexandra Huszák, Hungary

Source: IIHF.com

== Division II Group B ==
2012 IIHF Women's World Championship Division II B
Tournament details
- Host country: South Korea
- City: Seoul
- Venue: 1 (in 1 host city)
- Dates: 10–16 March 2012
- Teams: 6

Tournament statistics
- Matches played: 15
- Goals scored: 98 (6.53 per match)

The Division II Group B tournament was played in Seoul, South Korea, from 10 to 16 March 2012. The winners, Poland, were promoted to Division II A for 2013. While the rules stated that the 5th and 6th placed teams in Group B must enter a qualification tournament for next year if more member nations apply to compete, this did not happen.

=== Participating teams ===
Team	Qualification
Belgium	placed 6th in Division III last year and were relegated
South Korea	hosts; placed 2nd in Division IV last year
Iceland	placed 3rd in Division IV last year
South Africa	placed 5th in Division IV last year
Poland	placed 1st in Division V last year and were promoted
Spain	placed 2nd in Division V last year and were promoted

=== Final standings ===
Pos	Team	Pld	W	OTW	OTL	L	GF	GA	GD	Pts	Promotion
1	Poland	5	4	1	0	0	38	6	+32	14	Promoted to the 2013 Division II A
2	Spain	5	4	0	0	1	22	5	+17	12	
3	South Korea (H)	5	2	1	1	1	16	8	+8	9	
4	Iceland	5	2	0	1	2	11	15	−4	7	
5	Belgium	5	1	0	0	4	7	12	−5	3	
6	South Africa	5	0	0	0	5	4	52	−48	0	

Source: IIHF
(H) Host

=== Match results ===
All times are local (Korea Standard Time – UTC+9).

10 March 2012; 13:00	Iceland	2–1 (0–0, 1–1, 1–0)	Belgium	Mok-Dong Arena; Attendance: 200

Game reference

Karitas Halldorsdottir
Goalies
Kirsten Schonwetter
Referee:
(Switzerland) Anna Eskola
Linesmen:
(Japan) Tomomi Narusawa
(Slovakia) Viera Silhavikova

	0–1	20:36 – E. Clincke (S. Frere)
B. Baldursdóttir (S. Shantz-Smiley, A. Ágústsdóttir) – 38:41	1–1
B. Baldursdóttir – 56:30	2–1

6 min
Penalties
6 min
30
Shots
51

10 March 2012; 16:30	Spain	3–4 (0–2, 3–0, 0–2)	Poland	Mok-Dong Arena; Attendance: 300

Game reference

Carlota Alvarado
Virginia Martinez
Goalies
Agata Kosinska
Referee:
(Slovakia) Maria Zemiakova
Linesmen:
(South Korea) Young Hwang-Bo
(China) Fu Zhennan

	0–1	05:27 – K. Pozniewska (SH)
	0–2	09:57 – M. Szynal (M. Bigos)
A. Calero (L. Abrisqueta) (PP2) – 27:35	1–2
A. Calero (M. Gurrea) – 29:27	2–2
M. Gurrea (A. Ucedo) – 35:28	3–2
	3–3	47:42 – I. Malinowska (M. Czaplik, K. Pozniewska)
	3–4	48:14 – E. Czarnecka (S. Kosakowska)

8 min
Penalties
10 min
31
Shots
74

10 March 2012; 20:00	South Korea	10–2 (3–0, 4–1, 3–1)	South Africa	Mok-Dong Arena; Attendance: 800

Game reference

Shin So-jung
Han Do-hee
Goalies
Sandra McClurg
Referee:
(Finland) Maija Kontturi
Linesmen:
(Netherlands) Senovwa Mollen
(France) Sueva Torribo Rousselin

Han S. (Han J.) – 03:07	1–0
Jo S. – 10:07	2–0
Han S. (Han J.) – 18:40	3–0
Han S. (Han J.) – 24:45	4–0
Park J. – 30:49	5–0
Park J. (Han J.) – 35:14	6–0
	6–1	37:47 – D. Oxenham (D. Rhode)
Lee K. (Ko C.) – 39:22	7–1
Park J. (Yong H.) – 42:05	8–1
Park D. (Choi B.) – 52:16	9–1
Park J. (Han S.) – 53:14	10–1
	10–2	58:16 – T. van Eeckhoven (N. Sheffield, L. Lombard)

4 min
Penalties
0 min
70
Shots
14

11 March 2012; 13:00	Belgium	0–7 (0–2, 0–3, 0–2)	Poland	Mok-Dong Arena; Attendance: 100

Game reference

Kirsten Schonwetter
Jente Vanroy
Goalies
Malgorzata Burda
Referee:
(Slovakia) Maria Zemiakova
Linesmen:
(South Korea) Lee Kyung-Sun
(Netherlands) Senovwa Mollen

0–1	06:19 – M. Bigos
0–2	18:34 – P. Kulas (A. Berecka) (PP)
0–3	26:47 – A. Pioro (K. Pozniewska)
0–4	30:34 – K. Pozniewska (M. Czaplik)
0–5	35:35 – M. Czaplik (J. Detmer)
0–6	40:31 – K. Pozniewska
0–7	59:26 – M. Bigos

10 min
Penalties
8 min
31
Shots
70

11 March 2012; 16:30	South Africa	0–12 (0–1, 0–4, 0–7)	Spain	Mok-Dong Arena; Attendance: 150

Game reference

Sandra McClurg
Shaylene Swanepoel
Goalies
Virginia Martinez
Carlota Alvarado
Referee:
(Switzerland) Anna Eskola
Linesmen:
(France) Sueva Torribo Rousselin
(China) Fu Zhennan

0–1	15:09 – L. Ruiz (C. Hernández, A. Rodríguez) (PP)
0–2	24:22 – A. Ucedo (L. Ruiz, A. Rodríguez)
0–3	27:36 – L. Ortuno (L. Ruiz, E. Álvarez)
0–4	28:10 – A. Calero (M. Gurrea, L. Sainz)
0–5	35:24 – L. Ruiz (A. Ucedo, C. Hernandez)
0–6	41:11 – A. Merino (J. Fouz, L. Ortuno) (PP)
0–7	46:04 – A. Merino (L. Ortuno)
0–8	47:50 – A. Merino (L. Ruiz, C. Hernández)
0–9	48:01 – C. Hernández (L. Ruiz, A. Merino)
0–10	48:47 – M. Gurrea (A. Ucedo, A. Calero)
0–11	49:27 – J. Fouz (A. Merino, L. Ortuno)
0–12	52:55 – A. Ucedo (A. González, M. Gurrea)

12 min
Penalties
4 min
16
Shots
65

11 March 2012; 20:00	South Korea	2–1 GWS (0–0, 1–1, 0–0) (OT: 0–0) (SO: 1–0)	Iceland	Mok-Dong Arena; Attendance: 300

Game reference
Shin So-jung	Goalies	Karitas Halldorsdottir	Referee: (Finland) Maija Kontturi; Linesmen: (Japan) Tomomi Narusawa (Slovakia) Viera Silhavikova
Jo S. (Ahn K.) – 21:55 / 1–0; / 1–1 / 39:28 – A. Ágústsdóttir (S. Shantz-Smiley)			Referee: (Finland) Maija Kontturi; Linesmen: (Japan) Tomomi Narusawa (Slovakia) Viera Silhavikova
Han S. Park J. (miss); Lee K.	Shootout	(miss) S. Shantz-Smiley; (miss) B. Baldursdóttir	Referee: (Finland) Maija Kontturi; Linesmen: (Japan) Tomomi Narusawa (Slovakia) Viera Silhavikova
8 min	Penalties	4 min	Referee: (Finland) Maija Kontturi; Linesmen: (Japan) Tomomi Narusawa (Slovakia) Viera Silhavikova
47	Shots	40	Referee: (Finland) Maija Kontturi; Linesmen: (Japan) Tomomi Narusawa (Slovakia) Viera Silhavikova

13 March 2012; 13:00	Belgium	6–0 (2–0, 0–0, 4–0)	South Africa	Mok-Dong Arena; Attendance: 100

Game reference

Jente Vanroy
Kirsten Schonwetter
Goalies
Sandra McClurg
Referee:
(Canada) Sylena Mutsaers
Linesmen:
(South Korea) Young Hwang-Bo
(Slovakia) Viera Silhavikova

L. de Decker (V. Jenaer, S. Mommen) – 01:47	1–0
V. Jenaer (E. Leyen) – 05:27	2–0
S. Frere (S. Mommen, L. Buret) – 44:24	3–0
S. Frere (L. Bosmans) – 44:51	4–0
S. Morel de Westgaver (L. de Decker) – 50:51	5–0
L. de Decker (S. Frere, E. Leyen) – 55:27	6–0

4 min
Penalties
4 min
65
Shots
12

13 March 2012; 16:30	Iceland	2–7 (0–1, 2–1, 0–5)	Poland	Mok-Dong Arena; Attendance: 100

Game reference

Karitas Halldorsdottir
Goalies
Agata Kosinska
Referee:
(Switzerland) Anna Eskola
Linesmen:
(South Korea) Lee Kyung-Sun
(France) Sueva Torribo Rousselin

	0–1	12:05 – P. Kulas (K. Mizera)
S. Shantz-Smiley (S. Sigurgeirsdottir) (PP) – 21:17	1–1
	1–2	21:46 – M. Szynal (M. Bigos, A. Kierc)
S. Shantz-Smiley (G. Blondal, S. Sigurgeirsdottir) (PP) – 21:46	2–2
	2–3	41:07 – M. Szynal (E. Czarnecka, K. Mizera)
	2–4	43:06 – K. Frackowiak (M. Szaplik, K. Chrapek) (PP)
	2–5	47:50 – M. Szynal (M. Bigos, E. Czarnecka) (PP)
	2–6	52:30 – E. Czarnecka (M. Szynal, K. Mizera)
	2–7	59:14 – K. Byczkowska (K. Frackowiak, K. Pozniewska)

12 min
Penalties
8 min
26
Shots
58

13 March 2012; 20:00	South Korea	1–3 (0–0, 0–1, 1–2)	Spain	Mok-Dong Arena; Attendance: 300

Game reference

Shin So-jung
Goalies
Carlota Alvarado
Referee:
(Slovakia) Maria Zemiakova
Linesmen:
(Netherlands) Senovwa Mollen
(Japan) Tomomi Narusawa

	0–1	25:22 – A. Ucedo (M. Gurrea, A. Calero)
	0–2	40:49 – A. Calero (A. Ucedo)
Yong H. (Park J.) – 44:23	1–2
	1–3	49:19 – J. Fouz (A. Merino)

8 min
Penalties
4 min
35
Shots
40

15 March 2012; 13:00	South Africa	2–6 (1–2, 0–0, 1–4)	Iceland	Mok-Dong Arena; Attendance: 100

Game reference

Sandra McClurg
Goalies
Karítas Halldórsdóttir
Referee:
(Slovakia) Maria Zemiakova
Linesmen:
(South Korea) Young Hwang-Bo
(China) Fu Zehnnan

D. Oxenham (C. Schurrman, D. Rhode) (PP) – 04:12	1–0
	1–1	16:57 – S. Sigurgeirsdóttir (A. Ágústsdóttir, S. Shantz-Smiley) (PP)
	1–2	17:36 – F. Johannesdóttir (B. Bergthorsdóttir, H. Heimisdóttir)
	1–3	40:39 – B. Baldursdóttir (L. Sigfusdóttir)
	1–4	43:43 – G. Blondal (S. Shantz-Smiley, L. Sigfusdóttir)
D. Oxenham (D. Rhode) – 54:02	2–4
	2–5	55:14 – H. Heimisdóttir (S. Gunnlaugsdóttir, F. Johannesdóttir)
	2–6	55:41 – L. Sveinsdóttir (S. Finnbogadóttir)

10 min
Penalties
8 min
20
Shots
88

15 March 2012; 16:30	Spain	1–0 (0–0, 0–0, 1–0)	Belgium	Mok-Dong Arena; Attendance: 100

Game reference
Carlota Alvarado	Goalies	Kirsten Schönwetter	Referee: (Finland) Maija Kontturi; Linesmen: (South Korea) Lee Kyung-Sun (France) Sueva Torribio Rousselin
M. Gurrea (A. Ucedo) (PP) – 57:00 / 1–0			Referee: (Finland) Maija Kontturi; Linesmen: (South Korea) Lee Kyung-Sun (France) Sueva Torribio Rousselin
6 min	Penalties	8 min	Referee: (Finland) Maija Kontturi; Linesmen: (South Korea) Lee Kyung-Sun (France) Sueva Torribio Rousselin
36	Shots	28	Referee: (Finland) Maija Kontturi; Linesmen: (South Korea) Lee Kyung-Sun (France) Sueva Torribio Rousselin

15 March 2012; 20:00	Poland	2–1 OT (0–0, 0–0, 1–1) (OT: 1–0)	South Korea	Mok-Dong Arena; Attendance: 300

Game reference

Małgorzata Burda
Goalies
Shin So-jung
Referee:
(Canada) Sylena Mutsaers
Linesmen:
(Netherlands) Senovwa Mollen
(Japan) Tomomi Narusawa

K. Pozniewska (K. Chrapek) – 44:42	1–0
	1–1	59:05 – Park J. (Han S.)
K. Pozniewska – 61:18	2–1

14 min
Penalties
8 min
34
Shots
19

16 March 2012; 13:00	Iceland	0–3 (0–0, 0–2, 0–1)	Spain	Mok-Dong Arena; Attendance: 100

Game reference

Karítas Halldórsdóttir
Goalies
Carlota Alvarado
Referee:
(Canada) Sylena Mutsaers
Linesmen:
(South Korea) Young Hwang-Bo
(Japan) Tomomi Narusawa

0–1	22:17 – L. Ruiz (A. Calero) (PP)
0–2	32:09 – L. Ortuno (L. Ruiz, J. Fouz)
0–3	44:56 – A. Gonzalez (A. Merino, L. Ortuno)

8 min
Penalties
6 min
34
Shots
39

16 March 2012; 16:30	Poland	18–0 (5–0, 7–0, 6–0)	South Africa	Mok-Dong Arena; Attendance: 150

Game reference

Małgorzata Burda
Agata Kosinska
Goalies
Sandra McClurg
Shaylene Swanepoel
Referee:
(Finland) Maija Kontturi
Linesmen:
(South Korea) Lee Kyung-Sun
(France) Sueva Torribo Rousselin

K. Pozniewska (M. Czaplik) – 03:41	1–0
E. Czarnecka (M. Szynal) – 08:17	2–0
K. Pozniewska (PP) – 10:55	3–0
K. Pozniewska (M. Czaplik) – 11:21	4–0
M. Szynal (A. Kierc) – 17:41	5–0
S. Bielas – 23:21	6–0
A. Berecka (K. Byczkowska, P. Kulas) – 24:03	7–0
K. Chrapek (K. Pozniewska) – 25:33	8–0
M. Slimak – 27:16	9–0
K. Frackowiak – 27:32	10–0
M. Nowacka (K. Frackowiak) – 26:25	11–0
K. Pozniewska – 38:08	12–0
M. Bigos (M. Szynal) – 46:20	13–0
M. Szynal (M. Bigos) – 47:31	14–0
K. Frackowiak – 48:06	15–0
A. Berecka (P. Kulas) – 50:38	16–0
M. Czaplik (A. Pioro) – 52:10	17–0
S. Bielas (K. Frackowiak) – 59:55	18–0

4 min
Penalties
4 min
94
Shots
8

16 March 2012; 20:00	Belgium	0–2 (0–0, 0–1, 0–1)	South Korea	Mok-Dong Arena; Attendance: 800

Game reference
Kirsten Schönwetter	Goalies	Shin So-jung	Referee: (Switzerland) Anna Eskola; Linesmen: (Slovakia) Viera Silhavikova (China) Fu Zhennan
0–1 / 31:00 – Han J. (Yong H., Park J.); 0–2 / 59:57 – Park J. (Jo S., Lee K.) (ENG)			Referee: (Switzerland) Anna Eskola; Linesmen: (Slovakia) Viera Silhavikova (China) Fu Zhennan
6 min	Penalties	4 min	Referee: (Switzerland) Anna Eskola; Linesmen: (Slovakia) Viera Silhavikova (China) Fu Zhennan
24	Shots	24	Referee: (Switzerland) Anna Eskola; Linesmen: (Slovakia) Viera Silhavikova (China) Fu Zhennan

=== Statistics and awards ===
==== Scoring leaders ====
Pos	Player	Country	GP	G	A	Pts	+/−	PIM
1	Karolina Pozniewska	Poland	5	9	4	13	+12	4
2	Magdalena Szynal	Poland	5	6	3	9	+10	2
3	Park Jongah	South Korea	5	6	2	8	+9	0
4	Lucia Ruiz	Spain	5	3	5	8	+4	4
5	Ana Ucedo	Spain	5	3	5	8	+7	2
6	Alba Calero	Spain	5	4	3	7	+5	0
6	Han Soo-jin	South Korea	5	4	3	7	+6	4
6	Ainhoa Merino	Spain	5	4	3	7	+5	0
9	Marta Bigos	Poland	5	3	4	7	+9	0
9	Maria Gurrea	Spain	5	3	4	7	+5	4

GP = Games played; G = Goals; A = Assists; Pts = Points; +/− = Plus–minus; PIM = Penalties In Minutes

Source: IIHF.com

==== Goaltending leaders ====
(minimum 40% team's total ice time)

Pos	Player	Country	TOI	GA	GAA	Sv%	SO
1	Malgorzata Burda	Poland	152:15	1	0.39	98.15	1
2	Carlota Alvarado	Spain	257:41	5	1.16	97.14	2
3	Shin So-jung	South Korea	284:23	7	1.48	95.30	1
4	Kirsten Schönwetter	Belgium	238:35	9	2.26	93.43	0
5	Karítas Halldórsdóttir	Iceland	305:00	15	2.95	93.02	0

TOI = Time on ice (minutes:seconds); GA = Goals against; GAA = Goals against average; Sv% = Save percentage; SO = Shutouts

Source: IIHF.com

==== Directorate Awards ====
- Goaltender: Shin So-jung, South Korea
- Defenseman: Anna Ágústsdóttir, Iceland
- Forward: Karolina Pozniewska, Poland

Source: IIHF.com

== Division II Group B Qualification ==
The Division II Group B Qualification was cancelled in August 2011 due to a number of nations declining to participate. South Africa, which lost 2011 Division IV, and Spain, which was scheduled to host the 2012 Division II Group B Qualification, were placed into 2012 Division II Group B without qualification. The qualification was scheduled to include the following:

Team	Qualification
South Africa	placed 6th in Division IV last year and were supposed to be relegated
Spain	Hosts; placed 2nd in Division V last year
Bulgaria	placed 3rd in Division V last year
Turkey	placed 4th in Division V last year
Ireland	placed 5th in Division V last year
Mexico	first time applied to compete in World Championship
