= 2013 IIHF Women's World Championship Division II =

IIHF Women's Division II tournaments in 2013

Tournament details
- Host countries: New Zealand; Spain; Turkey
- Venues: 3 (in 3 host cities)
- Dates: 8–14 April 2013; 1–7 April 2013; 7–9 December 2012
- Teams: 15

The 2013 IIHF Women's World Championship Division II consisted of three international ice hockey tournaments organized by the International Ice Hockey Federation. Division II A, Division II B and Division II B Qualification represent the fourth, fifth and sixth tier of the IIHF Women's World Championship.

Beginning this year, the winners of the qualification tournament have to wait until the following year to play in the Division II Group B.

== Division II Group A ==
2013 IIHF Women's World Championship Division II A
Tournament details
- Host country: New Zealand
- City: Auckland
- Venue: 1 (in 1 host city)
- Dates: 8–14 April 2013
- Teams: 6

Tournament statistics
- Matches played: 15
- Goals scored: 100 (6.67 per match)

The Division II Group A tournament was played in Auckland, New Zealand, from 8 to 14 April 2013.

The winners of this tournament were promoted to the 2014 Division I B, while the last-placed team were relegated to the 2014 Division II B.

=== Participating teams ===
Team	Qualification
Italy	placed 6th in Division I B last year and were relegated
Hungary	placed 2nd in Division II A last year
Australia	placed 3rd in Division II A last year
New Zealand	hosts; placed 4th in Division II A last year
Slovenia	placed 5th in Division II A last year
Poland	placed 1st in Division II B last year and were promoted

=== Final standings ===
Pos	Team	Pld	W	OTW	OTL	L	GF	GA	GD	Pts	Promotion or relegation
1	Hungary	5	4	0	0	1	27	12	+15	12	Promoted to the 2014 Division I B
2	Italy	5	4	0	0	1	18	8	+10	12	
3	Australia	5	3	0	0	2	21	17	+4	9	
4	New Zealand (H)	5	2	0	1	2	14	20	−6	7	
5	Poland	5	1	1	0	3	10	16	−6	5	
6	Slovenia	5	0	0	0	5	10	27	−17	0	Relegated to the 2014 Division II B

Source: IIHF
(H) Host

=== Match results ===
All times are local (New Zealand Standard Time – UTC+12).

8 April 2013; 13:00	Hungary	9–1 (5–0, 3–0, 1–1)	Slovenia	Paradice Ice Arena, Auckland; Attendance: 60

Game reference

Boglárka Gegesy
Anikó Németh
Goalies
Ines Confidenti
Hedvika Korbar
Referee:
(Japan) Miamiko Utsumi
Linesmen:
(Canada) Megan Boyle
(New Zealand) Alicia Thomasen

D. Medgyes (F. Gasparics) – 01:04	1–0
D. Medgyes – 09:10	2–0
S. Dettrich (A. Kiss, R. Ungár) – 14:43	3–0
A. Huszák (N. Brgles, F. Gasparics) – 15:24	4–0
A. Huszák (F. Kiss-Simon) (PP) – 18:52	5–0
D. Medgyes (G. Szlaby) – 21:45	6–0
K. Trencsenyi – 24:48	7–0
F. Gasparics – 32:06	8–0
	8–1	42:27 – P. Pren (L. Deisinger, K. Biščak)
A. Huszák (G. Szlaby) – 44:48	9–1

10 min
Penalties
6 min
51
Shots
22

8 April 2013; 16:30	Australia	2–5 (1–3, 0–1, 1–1)	Italy	Paradice Ice Arena, Auckland; Attendance: 65

Game reference

Kristy Bruske
Goalies
Giulia Mazzocchi
Referee:
(China) Liu Chun Hua
Linesmen:
(Slovakia) Jana Habanová
(Japan) Hitomi Igarashi

	0–1	04:54 – E. Bonafini (T. Larger, E. Dalpra)
A. del Basso (S. Newmark, L. Parrington) (PP) – 07:01	1–1
	1–2	11:38 – E. Dalpra (PP)
	1–3	15:08 – F. Zandegiacomo Mistrofolo (PP)
	1–4	22:08 – F. Zandegiacomo Mistrofolo (M. Campo Bagatin)
	1–5	47:13 – B. Larger (N. Zaccherini, F. Zandegiacomo Mistrofolo) (PP)
A. del Basso (S. Teed) – 53:45	2–5

14 min
Penalties
8 min
13
Shots
37

8 April 2013; 20:00	Poland	2–1 OT (0–1, 0–0, 1–0) (OT 1–0)	New Zealand	Paradice Ice Arena, Auckland; Attendance: 250

Game reference

Agata Kosinska
Goalies
Grace Harrison
Referee:
(Czech Republic) Radka Růžičková
Linesmen:
(United States) Jacqueline Spresser
(China) Zhennan Fu

	0–1	16:02 – A. Thakker (J. Horner-Pascoe)
K. Wieczorek (PP) – 47:14	1–1
K. Wieczorek (M. Czaplik) – 63:52	2–1

10 min
Penalties
10 min
46
Shots
24

9 April 2013; 13:00	Hungary	3–5 (0–2, 3–1, 0–2)	Australia	Paradice Ice Arena, Auckland; Attendance: 40

Game reference

Boglárka Gegesy
Goalies
Jodie Walker
Kristy Bruske
Referee:
(United States) Melissa Szkola
Linesmen:
(Canada) Megan Boyle
(China) Zhennan Fu

	0–1	05:10 – S. Green (G. Moore)
	0–2	17:45 – A. del Basso (A. Seranko)
A. Huszák (F. Gasparics) (PP) – 21:53	1–2
	1–3	26:04 – A. Steranko (A. del Basso) (PP)
T. Horváth (K. Jókai-Szilágyi, D. Medgyes)	2–3
29:46 – A. Huszák (F. Gasparics, R. Ungar)	3–3
	3–4	41:07 – S. Lehmann (A. Steranko)
	3–5	58:01 – A. Steranko (C. Cockerell)

14 min
Penalties
6 min
38
Shots
31

9 April 2013; 16:30	Slovenia	2–3 (0–0, 0–0, 2–3)	Poland	Paradice Ice Arena, Auckland; Attendance: 30

Game reference

Ines Confidenti
Goalies
Agata Kosinska
Referee:
(Czech Republic) Radka Růžičková
Linesmen:
(United States) Jacqueline Spresser
(New Zealand) Alicia Thomasen

P. Pren – 40:54	1–0
P. Pren (M. Duh, N. Vakaričič) – 46:10	2–0
	2–1	46:51 – A. Berecka (K. Pozniewska)
	2–2	53:57 – K. Szewczyk
	2–3	59:45 – K. Wieczorek (K. Chrapek) (PP)

18 min
Penalties
14 min
19
Shots
47

9 April 2013; 20:00	Italy	6–2 (1–0, 3–1, 2–1)	New Zealand	Paradice Ice Arena, Auckland; Attendance: 250

Game reference

Giulia Mazzocchi
Goalies
Grace Harrison
Lyndal Heineman
Referee:
(China) Liu Chun Hua
Linesmen:
(Slovakia) Jana Habanová
(South Korea) Lee Kyung-sun

B. Larger (V. Bettarini) (PP) – 00:44	1–0
	1–1	21:29 – A. Goulding (K. Langford) (PP)
E. Ballardini (E. Dalpra, C. Saletta) – 24:54	2–1
B. Larger (L. de Rocco, E. Ballardini) (PP) – 32:09	3–1
F. Zandegiacomo (A. de la Forest de Divonne, L. de Rocco) – 36:47	4–1
A. de la Forest de Divonne – 40:51	5–1
C. Saletta (D. de Rugna, E. Dalpra) (PP) – 49:54	6–1
	6–2	55:26 – C. Heale (K. Langford)

10 min
Penalties
16 min
57
Shots
15

11 April 2013; 13:00	Italy	3–1 (0–0, 1–0, 2–1)	Slovenia	Paradice Ice Arena, Auckland; Attendance: 20

Game reference

Giulia Mazzocchi
Goalies
Ines Confidenti
Referee:
(China) Liu Chun Hua
Linesmen:
(South Korea) Lee Kyung-sun
(China) Zhennan Fu

H. Elliscasis (M. Campo Bagatin) – 22:56	1–0
B. Larger (F. Zandegiacomo) – 51:13	2–0
E. Dalpra – 51:56	3–0
	3–1	57:22 – P. Pren

10 min
Penalties
8 min
37
Shots
20

11 April 2013; 16:30	Hungary	6–3 (2–0, 1–1, 3–2)	Poland	Paradice Ice Arena, Auckland; Attendance: 80

Game reference

Anikó Németh
Goalies
Agata Kosinska
Referee:
(Japan) Miamiko Utsumi
Linesmen:
(United States) Jacqueline Spresser
(New Zealand) Alicia Thomasen

A. Huszák (F. Gasparics, F. Kiss-Simon) (PP) – 00:44	1–0
D. Medgyes (K. Jókai-Szilágyi) – 18:41	2–0
	2–1	23:00 – K. Pozniewska (M. Czaplik)
R. Dabasi (D. Medgyes) (PP) – 31:46	3–1
A. Huszák – 40:10	4–1
	4–2	40:17 – I. Malinowska
	4–3	46:56 – K. Szewczyk
A. Kiss (F. Gasparics) – 51:07	5–3
F. Gasparics – 53:17	6–3

16 min
Penalties
12 min
42
Shots
22

11 April 2013; 20:00	Australia	3–4 (1–1, 2–2, 0–1)	New Zealand	Paradice Ice Arena, Auckland; Attendance: 500

Game reference

Jodie Walker
Goalies
Grace Harrison
Referee:
(United States) Melissa Szkola
Linesmen:
(Canada) Megan Boyle
(Japan) Hitomi Igarashi

A. del Basso (A. Steranko) (PP) – 07:38	1–0
	1–1	17:35 – K. Langford (SH)
	1–2	30:18 – J. Horner-Pascoe (M. Gilchrist) (PP2)
	1–3	31:14 – Z. Pielak-Jones (K. Langford) (PP)
A. Steranko (A. del Basso) – 34:04	2–3
S. Green (G. Moore) – 34:46	3–3
	3–4	50:19 – T. Tissink (A. Thakker) (PP)

14 min
Penalties
10 min
26
Shots
25

12 April 2013; 13:00	Poland	0–3 (0–1, 0–0, 0–2)	Italy	Paradice Ice Arena, Auckland; Attendance: 35

Game reference

Malgorzata Burda
Goalies
Giulia Mazzocchi
Referee:
(China) Liu Chun Hua
Linesmen:
(Slovakia) Jana Habanová
(China) Zhennan Fu

0–1	11:26 – E. Dalpra
0–2	47:29 – M. Angeloni (B. Larger)
0–3	51:01 – D. de Rugna (E. Dalpra)

6 min
Penalties
14 min
22
Shots
45

12 April 2013; 16:30	Slovenia	3–7 (0–3, 1–0, 2–4)	Australia	Paradice Ice Arena, Auckland; Attendance: 130

Game reference

Ines Confidenti
Hedvika Korbar
Goalies
Kristy Bruske
Jodie Walker
Referee:
(Japan) Miamiko Utsumi
Linesmen:
(Canada) Megan Boyle
(South Korea) Lee Kyung-sun

	0–1	01:59 – S. Green
	0–2	06:00 – A. Steranko (A. del Basso, L. Parrington)
	0–3	14:10 – S. Green (L. Parrington)
P. Pren (N. Vakaričič) – 24:46	1–3
P. Pren – 41:28	2–3
T. Lepir (N. Vakaričič) – 43:02	3–3
	3–4	45:31 – C. Cockerell (A. Steranko, L. Parrington) (PP)
	3–5	51:09 – S. Green (A. Steranko)
	3–6	53:21 – A. del Basso
	3–7	57:42 – A. Steranko (A. del Basso)

6 min
Penalties
2 min
25
Shots
45

12 April 2013; 20:00	New Zealand	2–6 (0–1, 1–3, 1–2)	Hungary	Paradice Ice Arena, Auckland; Attendance: 300

Game reference

Grace Harrison
Lyndal Heineman
Goalies
Anikó Németh
Referee:
(United States) Melissa Szkola
Linesmen:
(Japan) Hitomi Igarashi
(United States) Jacqueline Spresser

	0–1	03:37 – A. Huszák (PS)
	0–2	20:51 – A. Huszák (M. Molnár) (PP)
	0–3	32:42 – A. Huszák
K. Langford (S. Haslemore) – 34:47	1–3
	1–4	38:46 – D. Medgyes (F. Kiss-Simon)
	1–5	42:23 – L. Pintér (R. Dabasi) (PP)
T. Tissink (A. Thakker) – 43:11	2–5
	2–6	58:32 – A. Huszák (A. Kiss)

10 min
Penalties
6 min
17
Shots
39

14 April 2013; 13:00	Australia	4–2 (0–0, 2–1, 2–1)	Poland	Paradice Ice Arena, Auckland; Attendance: 120

Game reference

Malgorzata Burda
Goalies
Jodie Walker
Referee:
(China) Liu Chun Hua
Linesmen:
(Japan) Hitomi Igarashi
(New Zealand) Alicia Thomasen

A. Steranko (A. del Basso, S. Teed) – 27:08	1–0
L. Parrington (S. Green, A. Steranko) – 29:57	2–0
	2–1	32:10 – M. Huszák (K. Pozniewska) (PP)
	2–2	41:22 – K. Frackowiak
A. Steranko (A. del Basso) – 46:52	3–2
A. Steranko (PP) – 58:03	4–2

10 min
Penalties
6 min
37
Shots
30

14 April 2013; 16:30	New Zealand	5–3 (1–1, 1–1, 3–1)	Slovenia	Paradice Ice Arena, Auckland; Attendance: 360

Game reference

Lyndal Heineman
Grace Harrison
Goalies
Hedvika Korbar
Referee:
(Japan) Miamiko Utsumi
Linesmen:
(South Korea) Lee Kyung-sun
(Czech Republic) Radka Růžičková

A. Thakker (J. Horner-Pascoe) – 09:34	1–0
	1–1	15:16 – M. Duh (P. Pren, N. Vakaričič) (PP)
	1–2	33:02 – T. Lahajnar (U. Pazlar)
A. Goulding (Z. Pielak-Jones, K. Langford) (PP) – 39:26	2–2
R. Gottgtroy (A. Thakker) – 48:31	3–2
K. Langford (S. Haslemore) – 49:09	4–2
K. Langford (R. Gottgtroy, Z. Pielak-Jones) (PP) – 58:04	5–2
	5–3	58:26 – I. Prezelj (P. Pren)

4 min
Penalties
6 min
51
Shots
15

14 April 2013; 20:00	Italy	1–3 (0–1, 0–1, 1–1)	Hungary	Paradice Ice Arena, Auckland; Attendance: 230

Game reference

Giulia Mazzocchi
Goalies
Anikó Németh
Referee:
(United States) Melissa Szkola
Linesmen:
(Canada) Megan Boyle
(Slovakia) Jana Habanová

	0–1	00:25 – V. Somogyi (A. Huszák)
	0–2	39:31 – A. Kiss
	0–3	41:13 – D. Medgyes (G. Szlaby)
M. Campo Bagatin (L. de Rocco) – 58:11	1–3

10 min
Penalties
12 min
29
Shots
30

=== Statistics and awards ===
==== Scoring leaders ====
Pos	Player	Country	GP	G	A	Pts	+/−	PIM
1	Andrea Steranko	Australia	5	8	6	14	+9	6
2	Alexandra Huszák	Hungary	5	11	1	12	+5	16
3	Alivia del Basso	Australia	5	5	6	11	+5	6
4	Dorottya Medgyes	Hungary	5	6	2	8	+6	2
4	Pia Pren	Slovenia	5	6	2	8	–1	2
6	Fanni Gasparics	Hungary	5	2	6	8	+9	2
7	Shona Green	Australia	5	6	1	7	+2	2
8	Kiri Langford	New Zealand	5	4	3	7	0	10
9	Eleonora Dalpra	Italy	5	3	4	7	+5	4
10	Beatrix Larger	Italy	5	4	1	5	+1	4

GP = Games played; G = Goals; A = Assists; Pts = Points; +/− = Plus–minus; PIM = Penalties In Minutes
Source: IIHF.com

==== Goaltending leaders ====
(minimum 40% team's total ice time)

Pos	Player	Country	TOI	GA	GAA	Sv%	SO
1	Giula Mazzocchi	Italy	300:00	8	1.60	92.00	1
2	Anikó Németh	Hungary	247:04	9	2.19	90.62	0
3	Ines Confidenti	Slovenia	164:59	11	4.00	90.27	1
4	Kristy Bruske	Australia	133:16	8	3.60	89.74	0
5	Grace Harrison	New Zealand	228:49	15	3.93	89.51	0

TOI = Time on ice (minutes:seconds); GA = Goals against; GAA = Goals against average; Sv% = Save percentage; SO = Shutouts
Source: IIHF.com

==== Directorate Awards ====
- Goaltender: Giulia Mazzocchi, Italy
- Defenseman: Franciska Kiss-Simon, Hungary
- Forward: Alexandra Huszák, Hungary

Source: IIHF.com

== Division II Group B ==
2013 IIHF Women's World Championship Division II B
Tournament details
- Host country: Spain
- City: Puigcerdà
- Venue: 1 (in 1 host city)
- Dates: 1–7 April 2013
- Teams: 6

Tournament statistics
- Matches played: 15
- Goals scored: 100 (6.67 per match)

The Division II Group B tournament was played in Puigcerdà, Spain, from 1 to 7 April 2013.

The winners of this tournament were promoted to the 2014 Division II A, while the last-placed team were relegated to the 2014 Division II B Qualification.

=== Participating teams ===
Team	Qualification
Croatia	placed 6th in Division II A last year and were relegated
Spain	hosts; placed 2nd in Division II B last year
South Korea	placed 3rd in Division II B last year
Iceland	placed 4th in Division II B last year
Belgium	placed 5th in Division II B last year
South Africa	placed 6th in Division II B last year

=== Final standings ===
Pos	Team	Pld	W	OTW	OTL	L	GF	GA	GD	Pts	Promotion or relegation
1	South Korea	5	5	0	0	0	20	3	+17	15	Promoted to the 2014 Division II A
2	Spain (H)	5	4	0	0	1	23	7	+16	12	
3	Croatia	5	2	1	0	2	26	15	+11	8	
4	Iceland	5	1	1	0	3	13	15	−2	5	
5	Belgium	5	1	0	2	2	12	10	+2	5	
6	South Africa	5	0	0	0	5	6	50	−44	0	Relegated to the 2014 Division II B Qualification

Source: IIHF
(H) Host

=== Match results ===
All times are local (Central European Summer Time – UTC+2).

1 April 2013; 13:00	South Africa	1–5 (1–4, 0–0, 0–1)	Iceland	Poliesportiu Puigcerdà, Puigcerdà; Attendance: 150

Game reference

Shaylene Swanepoel
Goalies
Gudlaug Thorsteinsdottir
Referee:
(Canada) Meghan Mallette
Linesmen:
(Italy) Mirjam Gruber
(Netherlands) Senovwa Mollen

	0–1	00:40 – T. Gudmundsdottir (B. Baldursdottir)
	0–2	00:56 – K. Ingadottir (S. Sigurgeirsdottir, S. Shantz-Smiley)
	0–3	07:34 – S. Shantz-Smiley (G. Blondal)
	0–4	10:39 – J. Gudbjartsdottir (S. Shantz-Smiley, A. Sigurdardottir)
F. Shannon (D. Oxenham) – 11:26	1–4
	1–5	45:01 – B. Baldursdottir

14 min
Penalties
10 min
17
Shots
27

1 April 2013; 16:30	South Korea	4–1 (0–1, 0–0, 4–0)	Croatia	Poliesportiu Puigcerdà, Puigcerdà; Attendance: 160

Game reference

Shin So-jung
Goalies
Petra Belobrk
Referee:
(Slovakia) Nikoleta Celarova
Linesmen:
(Denmark) Malene Skovbakke
(Czech Republic) Gabriela Stastna

	0–1	05:28 – V. Gurka (A. Kadijević)
Ahn K-Y. (Jo S-S.) – 48:22	1–1
Lee Y-H. – 51:03	2–1
Park J-A. (Cho M-H.) (PP) – 51:42	3–1
Lee Y-J. (Cho M-H.) – 59:50	4–1

2 min
Penalties
8 min
30
Shots
32

1 April 2013; 20:00	Spain	3–1 (0–1, 1–0, 2–0)	Belgium	Poliesportiu Puigcerdà, Puigcerdà; Attendance: 325

Game reference

Carlota Alvarado
Goalies
Jente Vanroy
Kirsten Schonwetter
Referee:
(Netherlands) Gabriella Gran
Linesmen:
(Finland) Jenni Jaatinen
(Slovenia) Natasa Pagon

	0–1	03:16 – V. Jenaer (S. Morel de Westgaver)
A. Ucedo – 27:28	1–1
L. Ruiz (A. Merino) – 48:33	2–1
A. Ucedo (ENG) – 59:44	3–1

6 min
Penalties
8 min
66
Shots
12

3 April 2013; 13:00	Croatia	5–4 (2–0, 3–2, 0–2)	Iceland	Poliesportiu Puigcerdà, Puigcerdà; Attendance: 50

Game reference

Petra Belobrk
Goalies
Gudlaug Thorsteinsdottir
Referee:
(Russia) Yana Zueva
Linesmen:
(Germany) Natalie Mauelshagen
(Denmark) Malene Skovbakke

A. Siranović (N. Matić) (PP) – 11:24	1–0
E. Filipeć (PP) – 12:37	2–0
D. Kruselj Posaveć (PP) – 20:41	3–0
	3–1	21:37 – S. Shantz-Smiley
	3–2	35:55 – S. Sigurgeirsdottir (S. Shantz-Smiley)
D. Kruselj Posaveć (V. Gurka, A. Siranović) – 36:16	4–2
E. Filipeć (SH2) – 38:50	5–2
	5–3	51:00 – S. Shantz-Smiley (S. Sigurgeirsdottir)
	5–4	57:45 – S. Shantz-Smiley (SH)

10 min
Penalties
16 min
39
Shots
25

3 April 2013; 16:30	Belgium	9–1 (1–0, 5–1, 3–0)	South Africa	Poliesportiu Puigcerdà, Puigcerdà; Attendance: 120

Game reference

Kirsten Schonwetter
Jente Vanroy
Goalies
Shaylene Swanepoel
Danielle Kotze
Referee:
(Slovakia) Nikoleta Celarova
Linesmen:
(Netherlands) Senovwa Mollen
(Slovenia) Natasa Pagon

S. Frere (L. de Decker) (PP) – 19:09	1–0
L. Buret (N. Liesens) – 22:38	2–0
F. Bosmans (E. Leyen, L. Buret) – 24:59	3–0
L. Cranskens (E. Clincke, E. Leyen) – 27:01	4–0
L. de Decker (S. Morel de Westgaver) – 32:58	5–0
	5–1	34:06 – D. Rhode (T. van Eeckhoven)
S. Morel de Westgaver (L. de Decker, S. Frere) – 35:14	6–1
V. Jenaer (L. Buret, C. Hausmann) – 53:05	7–1
E. Clincke (S. Morel de Westgaver, L. Buret) – 54:47	8–1
L. de Decker (S. Morel de Westgaver) – 57:37	9–1

10 min
Penalties
10 min
51
Shots
17

3 April 2013; 20:00	Spain	0–3 (0–0, 0–0, 0–3)	South Korea	Poliesportiu Puigcerdà, Puigcerdà; Attendance: 320

Game reference

Carlota Alvarado
Goalies
Shin So-jung
Referee:
(Canada) Meghan Mallette
Linesmen:
(Italy) Mirjam Gruber
(Czech Republic) Gabriela Stastna

0–1	43:02 – Jo S-S. (Lee Y-J.)
0–2	47:22 – Park J-A.)
0–3	57:31 – Park J-A. (Han S-J.) (ENG)

12 min
Penalties
14 min
35
Shots
29

4 April 2013; 13:00	Croatia	2–1 OT (1–0, 0–0, 0–1) (OT 1–0)	Belgium	Poliesportiu Puigcerdà, Puigcerdà; Attendance: 175

Game reference

Petra Belobrk
Goalies
Kirsten Schonwetter
Referee:
(Slovakia) Nikoleta Celarova
Linesmen:
(Slovenia) Natasa Pagon
(Czech Republic) Gabriela Stastna

A. Kadijević (E. Filipeć) – 10:31	1–0
	1–1	48:51 – L. de Decker (R. de Wolf)
E. Filipeć – 63:43	2–1

6 min
Penalties
14 min
49
Shots
22

4 April 2013; 16:30	South Korea	4–1 (1–1, 2–0, 1–0)	Iceland	Poliesportiu Puigcerdà, Puigcerdà; Attendance: 125

Game reference

Shin So-jung
Han Do-hee
Goalies
Gudlaug Thorsteinsdottir
Referee:
(Netherlands) Gabriella Gran
Linesmen:
(Finland) Jenni Jaatinen
(Germany) Natalie Mauelshagen

	0–1	08:39 – S. Shantz-Smiley (S. Sigurgeirsdottir)
Jo S-S. (Ahn K-Y.) – 13:51	1–1
Ko H-I. – 22:30	2–1
Park J-A. (Han S-J.) – 30:36	3–1
Lee Y-J. (Ahn K-Y.) – 58:03	4–1

6 min
Penalties
10 min
39
Shots
20

4 April 2013; 20:00	Spain	12–1 (3–0, 4–0, 5–1)	South Africa	Poliesportiu Puigcerdà, Puigcerdà; Attendance: 365

Game reference

Virginia Martínez
Goalies
Shaylene Swanepoel
Danielle Kotze
Referee:
(Russia) Yana Zueva
Linesmen:
(Italy) Mirjam Gruber
(Denmark) Malene Skovbakke

M. Gurrea (L. Abrisqueta, A. Calero) (PP) – 14:25	1–0
C. Hernández (L. Ruiz) (PP) – 15:20	2–0
A. Merino (PP) – 19:08	3–0
A. Sierra (J. Fouz, L. Ortuno) – 20:43	4–0
L. Ruiz – 23:34	5–0
L. Ruiz (C. Hernández) – 27:36	6–0
A. Ucedo (M. Gurrea) – 33:01	7–0
C. de la Pompa (V. Ibañez, A. Peralta) – 48:05	8–0
M. Gurrea (L. Rebolledo, L. Sainz) – 52:45	9–0
	9–1	53:33 – C. Schuurman (D. Oxenham) (PP)
A. Merino – 55:03	10–1
V. Abrisqueta (PP) – 58:22	11–1
C. de la Pompa (L. Rebolledo) – 59:27	12–1

30 min
Penalties
18 min
41
Shots
17

6 April 2013; 13:00	Belgium	0–2 (0–1, 0–0, 0–1)	South Korea	Poliesportiu Puigcerdà, Puigcerdà; Attendance: 130

Game reference
Shin So-jung	Goalies	Kirsten Schonwetter	Referee: (Netherlands) Gabriella Gran; Linesmen: (Finland) Jenni Jaatinen (Czech Republic) Gabriela Stastna
0–1 / 12:34 – Jo S-S. (Bang S-W., Ahn K-Y.); 0–2 / 44:44 – Park J-A. (PP)			Referee: (Netherlands) Gabriella Gran; Linesmen: (Finland) Jenni Jaatinen (Czech Republic) Gabriela Stastna
10 min	Penalties	8 min	Referee: (Netherlands) Gabriella Gran; Linesmen: (Finland) Jenni Jaatinen (Czech Republic) Gabriela Stastna
19	Shots	44	Referee: (Netherlands) Gabriella Gran; Linesmen: (Finland) Jenni Jaatinen (Czech Republic) Gabriela Stastna

6 April 2013; 16:30	South Africa	2–17 (0–8, 2–3, 0–6)	Croatia	Poliesportiu Puigcerdà, Puigcerdà; Attendance: 80

Game reference

Shaylene Swanepoel
Danielle Kotze
Goalies
Petra Belobrk
Lana Belić
Referee:
(Russia) Yana Zueva
Linesmen:
(Italy) Mirjam Gruber
(Slovenia) Natasa Pagon

	0–1	03:38 – N. Matić (E. Filipeć)
	0–2	09:54 – N. Matić (A. Siranović, E. Filipeć) (PP)
	0–3	10:20 – K. Bednjaneć (M. Smoleć, N. Matić)
	0–4	11:13 – D. Kruselj Posaveć (E. Filipeć)
	0–5	11:43 – D. Kruselj Posaveć (PP)
	0–6	12:28 – D. Kruselj Posaveć
	0–7	12:59 – A. Kadijević (M. Smoleć)
	0–8	16:09 – A. Kadijević
D. Oxenham – 24:26	1–8
	1–9	28:47 – A. Siranović (N. Matić, A. Kadijević)
	1–10	29:07 – A. Kadijević (V. Gurka)
	1–11	37:42 – E. Filipeć
T. van Eeckhoven (D. Rhode, K. Jamieson) – 38:54	2–11
	2–12	41:19 – M. Klanać (E. Filipeć)
	2–13	41:29 – E. Filipeć (N. Matić)
	2–14	43:54 – A. Kadijević (D. Kruselj Posaveć, A. Siranović)
	2–15	44:06 – M. Klanać (N. Matić)
	2–16	45:23 – N. Matić (A. Siranović) (PP)
	2–17	47:42 – V. Gurka (T. Delić, K. Bednjaneć)

10 min
Penalties
6 min
10
Shots
51

6 April 2013; 20:00	Iceland	1–4 (0–1, 0–0, 1–3)	Spain	Poliesportiu Puigcerdà, Puigcerdà; Attendance: 400

Game reference

Iris Hafberg
Gudlaug Thorsteinsdottir
Goalies
Carlota Alvarado
Referee:
(Canada) Meghan Mallette
Linesmen:
(Germany) Natalie Mauelshagen
(Netherlands) Senovwa Mollen

	0–1	11:14 – A. Ucedo (A. Calero, M. Gurrea) (PP)
	0–2	44:04 – L. Ortuno (L. Ruiz, A. González) (PP)
	0–3	53:26 – A. Sierra (L. Ruiz, L. Ortuno)
K. Ingadottir (S. Sigurgeirsdottir) (PP) – 54:55	1–3
	1–4	56:15 – L. Abrisqueta (M. Gurrea) (PP)

10 min
Penalties
2 min
12
Shots
37

7 April 2013; 13:00	South Korea	7–1 (1–1, 4–0, 2–0)	South Africa	Poliesportiu Puigcerdà, Puigcerdà; Attendance: 75

Game reference

Han Do-hee
Goalies
Shaylene Swanepoel
Referee:
(Russia) Yana Zueva
Linesmen:
(Finland) Jenni Jaatinen
(Denmark) Malene Skovbakke

	0–1	11:05 – N. Schuurman
Han S-J. – 12:31	1–1
Park J-A. (Han S-J.) – 20:45	2–1
Jo S-S. (Ahn K-Y., Bang S-W.) – 30:24	3–1
Lee Y-H. – 32:53	4–1
Han S-J. (Park J-A., Park Y-E.) – 34:07	5–1
Park J-A. (Lee Y-J.) (PP) – 48:27	6–1
Lee Y-H. (Han S-J.) – 56:15	7–1

6 min
Penalties
8 min
64
Shots
19

7 April 2013; 16:30	Iceland	2–1 OT (1–0, 0–0, 0–1) (OT 1–0)	Belgium	Poliesportiu Puigcerdà, Puigcerdà; Attendance: 90

Game reference

Iris Hafberg
Goalies
Jente Vanroy
Referee:
(Canada) Meghan Mallette
Linesmen:
(Germany) Natalie Mauelshagen
(Slovenia) Natasa Pagon

K. Ryan (B. Baldursdottir) – 19:02	1–0
	1–1	48:57 – S. Frere (L. de Decker, S. Liedts)
A. Agustsdottir (H. Einarsdottir-Thorlacius) – 61:23	2–1

10 min
Penalties
8 min
26
Shots
25

7 April 2013; 20:00	Croatia	1–4 (0–0, 1–3, 0–1)	Spain	Poliesportiu Puigcerdà, Puigcerdà; Attendance: 550

Game reference

Petra Belobrk
Goalies
Carlota Alvarado
Referee:
(Slovakia) Nikoleta Celarova
Linesmen:
(Italy) Mirjam Gruber
(Netherlands) Senovwa Mollen

	0–1	20:21 – A. Calero (A. González)
	0–2	22:02 – C. Hernández (A. Merino, L. Ruiz)
A. Siranović (E. Filipeć)(PP) – 24:46	1–2
	1–3	26:19 – L. Ortuno (V. Abrisqueta)
	1–4	43:28 – A. Merino (A. González, J. Fouz)

14 min
Penalties
14 min
33
Shots
34

=== Statistics and awards ===
==== Scoring leaders ====
Pos	Player	Country	GP	G	A	Pts	+/−	PIM
1	Ela Filipeć	Croatia	5	5	6	11	+4	8
2	Park Jong-ah	South Korea	5	7	1	8	+5	4
3	Sarah Shantz-Smiley	Iceland	5	4	4	8	+4	0
4	Nadja Matić	Croatia	5	3	5	8	0	2
5	Anja Kadijević	Croatia	5	5	2	7	–3	2
6	Ana Siranović	Croatia	5	3	4	7	0	6
7	Diana Kruselj Posaveć	Croatia	5	5	1	6	+1	4
8	Ainhoa Merino	Spain	5	4	2	6	+4	2
9	Leen de Decker	Belgium	5	3	3	6	+2	0
10	Han Soo-jin	South Korea	5	2	4	6	+6	0
10	Lucia Ruiz	Spain	5	2	4	6	+6	0

GP = Games played; G = Goals; A = Assists; Pts = Points; +/− = Plus–minus; PIM = Penalties In Minutes
Source: IIHF.com

==== Goaltending leaders ====
(minimum 40% team's total ice time)

Pos	Player	Country	TOI	GA	GAA	Sv%	SO
1	Shin So-jung	South Korea	230:00	2	0.52	98.00	2
2	Kirsten Schönwetter	Belgium	214:44	6	1.68	95.89	0
3	Carlota Alvarado	Spain	239:37	7	1.25	94.12	0
4	Gudlaug Thorsteinsdottir	Iceland	221:23	14	3.79	88.80	0
5	Petra Belobrk	Croatia	283:43	15	3.17	87.29	0

TOI = Time on ice (minutes:seconds); GA = Goals against; GAA = Goals against average; Sv% = Save percentage; SO = Shutouts
Source: IIHF.com

==== Directorate Awards ====
- Goaltender: Shin So-jung, South Korea
- Defenseman: Ela Filipeć, Croatia
- Forward: Ana Ucedo, Spain

Source: IIHF.com

== Division II Group B Qualification ==
2013 IIHF Women's World Championship Division II B Qualification
Tournament details
- Host country: Turkey
- City: İzmir
- Venue: 1 (in 1 host city)
- Dates: 7–9 December 2012
- Teams: 6

Tournament statistics
- Matches played: 3
- Goals scored: 22 (7.33 per match)

The Division II Group B Qualification tournament was played in İzmir, Turkey, from 7 to 9 December 2012.

The winners of this tournament were promoted to the 2014 Division II B.

=== Participating teams ===
Team	Qualification
Bulgaria	placed 3rd in 2011 Division V
Turkey	hosts; placed 4th in 2011 Division V
Ireland	placed 5th in 2011 Division V

=== Final standings ===
Pos	Team	Pld	W	OTW	OTL	L	GF	GA	GD	Pts	Promotion
1	Turkey (H)	2	2	0	0	0	11	4	+7	6	Promoted to the 2014 Division II B
2	Bulgaria	2	1	0	0	1	9	5	+4	3	
3	Ireland	2	0	0	0	2	2	13	−11	0	

Source: IIHF
(H) Host

=== Match results ===
All times are local (Turkey Time – UTC+2).

7 December 2012; 19:00	Bulgaria	3–4 (0–0, 3–1, 0–3)	Turkey	Bornova Ice Sports Hall, İzmir; Attendance: 775

Game reference

Kamelia Ivanova
Goalies
Tanay Günay
Referee:
(Germany) Michaela Kiefer
Linesmen:
(Germany) Diana Pencun
(Hungary) Zsuzsanna Sandor

	0–1	28:52 – S. Demir (SH)
S. Stoyanova (M. Zareva) (PP) – 35:52	1–1
L. Bobeva (A. Koleva, M. Zareva) – 39:33	2–1
L. Bobeva (A. Koleva) – 39:58	3–1
	3–2	45:20 – T. Dokur (S. Demir, S. Yilmaz)
	3–3	55:28 – S. Demir (B. Demirkol, G. Öztaşdelen)
	3–4	58:13 – D. Aydoğdu (Y. Yüksel, M. Decu)

4 min
Penalties
8 min
3
Shots
4

8 December 2012; 19:00	Bulgaria	6–1 (2–0, 3–0, 1–1)	Ireland	Bornova Ice Sports Hall, İzmir; Attendance: 198

Game reference

Kamelia Ivanova
Vasela Krasteva
Goalies
Seanna Conway
Rebekah Burke
Referee:
(Sweden) Annika Floden
Linesmen:
(Germany) Diana Pencun
(Turkey) Merve Sarimert

L. Bobeva – 15:50	1–0
O. Gospodinova (S. Stoyanova) – 19:09	2–0
M. Zareva – 20:47	3–0
O. Gospodinova (T. Lisichkova) – 35:23	4–0
S. Stoyanova (S. Kovacheva) – 36:27	5–0
	5–1	42:19 – C. McCaughley
T. Lisichkova – 55:24	6–1

0 min
Penalties
2 min
6
Shots
1

9 December 2012; 19:00	Ireland	1–7 (0–3, 1–2, 0–2)	Turkey	Bornova Ice Sports Hall, İzmir; Attendance: 612

Game reference

Seanna Conway
Goalies
Mine Güngör
Referee:
(Sweden) Annika Floden
Linesmen:
(Germany) Diana Pencun
(Hungary) Zsuzsanna Sandor

	0–1	00:24 – G. Öztaşdelen (B. Demirkol, S. Demir)
	0–2	04:56 – T. Dokur (M. Decu)
	0–3	06:11 – C. Alkan (B. Demirkol, S. Demir) (PP)
	0–4	23:09 – B. Demirkol
S. McEneaney (L. Lyons) – 29:04	1–4
	1–5	37:21 – G. Öztaşdelen (B. Demirkol, S. Demir)
	1–6	52:54 – S. Demir (C. Alkan, G. Öztaşdelen) (PP)
	1–7	57:53 – S. Demir (T. Dokur, M. Decu)

6 min
Penalties
16 min
1
Shots
7
