= Zsófia Jókai Szilágyi =

Hungarian ice hockey forward

- Born: 25 September 1992 (age 33) Budapest, Hungary
- Height: 171 cm (5 ft 7 in)
- Weight: 60 kg (132 lb; 9 st 6 lb)
- Position: Forward
- Shot: Left
- Played for: Luleå HF/MSSK; Munksund-Skuthamns SK; SC Weinfelden Ladies; KMH Budapest; Ormsta HC; Marilyn Budapest
- National team: Hungary
- Playing career: 2005–2021

Zsófia Jókai Szilágyi (born 25 September 1992) is a Hungarian retired ice hockey forward and eleven-season member of the Hungarian national ice hockey team. Her club career spanned sixteen seasons and was played in the Elite Women's Hockey League (EWHL), the Swiss Women's Hockey League A (SWHL A), and the Swedish Women's Hockey League (SDHL). At the conclusion of the 2020–21 SDHL season, she ranked second in all-time games played for Luleå HF/MSSK.

== Playing career ==
Jókai Szilágyi's career began in 2005, at age 13, with Marilyn Budapest in the Elite Women's Hockey League (renamed European Women's Hockey League in 2019). She played in eleven games in her first season but did not record a point. The following season, she joined the women's senior representative team of the Budapest Stars, ranking third on the team for scoring with six points (1 goal + 5 assists) in 21 games played. She remained with Budapest Stars for the 2007–08 EWHL season and continued to improve, leading the team in scoring with eleven points (6+5) in 20 games played.

In 2008, when she was 16, Jókai Szilágyi left Hungary to attend a hockey academy in Växjö, Sweden. She played with Ormsta HC of the Riksserien (renamed Swedish Women's Hockey League in 2016) for the 2011–12 season, recording five goals and two assists (7 points) across 21 games in the regular season before the team was relegated in the postseason qualification round (Swedish: Kvalserien).

After the season spent with Ormsta, she returned to Hungary, joining the Újpesti-Vasas junior men's under-18 team alongside her national team teammates Fanni Gasparics, Alexandra Huszák, and Franciska Kiss-Simon. Jókai Szilágyi made the most appearances of any of the women signed to the team, playing in 25 games in the 2012–13 season and recording five points (2+3). She also played eight games in the 2012–13 EWHL season with KMH Budapest, scoring three goals and three assists.

Jókai Szilágyi returned to Sweden to join Munksund-Skuthamns SK (MSSK) in 2014, staying with the club as they merged with Luleå HF the next year to form Luleå HF/MSSK. She would win three SDHL championships with the team between 2016 and 2019, making it to the finals again in 2020, before the season was cancelled due to the COVID-19 pandemic in Sweden. In October 2018, she was involved in an incident where the MODO Hockey goaltending coach threw a water bottle at her after a Luleå victory.

=== International play ===
Jókai Szilágyi has played for the senior Hungarian national team since 2010, as the team was reorganized from IIHF Women's World Championship Division III in 2011 to Division II A in 2012, and earned promotion to Division I B in 2013 and Division I A in 2016. She served as an assistant captain for the country during both the 2013 and 2017 Olympic qualification tournaments.
