= List of IIHF World Rankings =

This is a list of IIHF World Rankings from its inception in 2003. The IIHF World Ranking is a ranking of the performance of the national ice hockey teams of member countries of the International Ice Hockey Federation (IIHF). It is based on a formula giving points for each team's placings at IIHF-sanctioned tournaments over the previous four years. The ranking is used to determine seedings and qualification requirements for future IIHF tournaments.

The system was approved at the IIHF congress of September 2003. According to IIHF President René Fasel, the system was designed to be simple to understand and "reflect the long-term quality of all national hockey programs and their commitment to international hockey".

== Men's ==
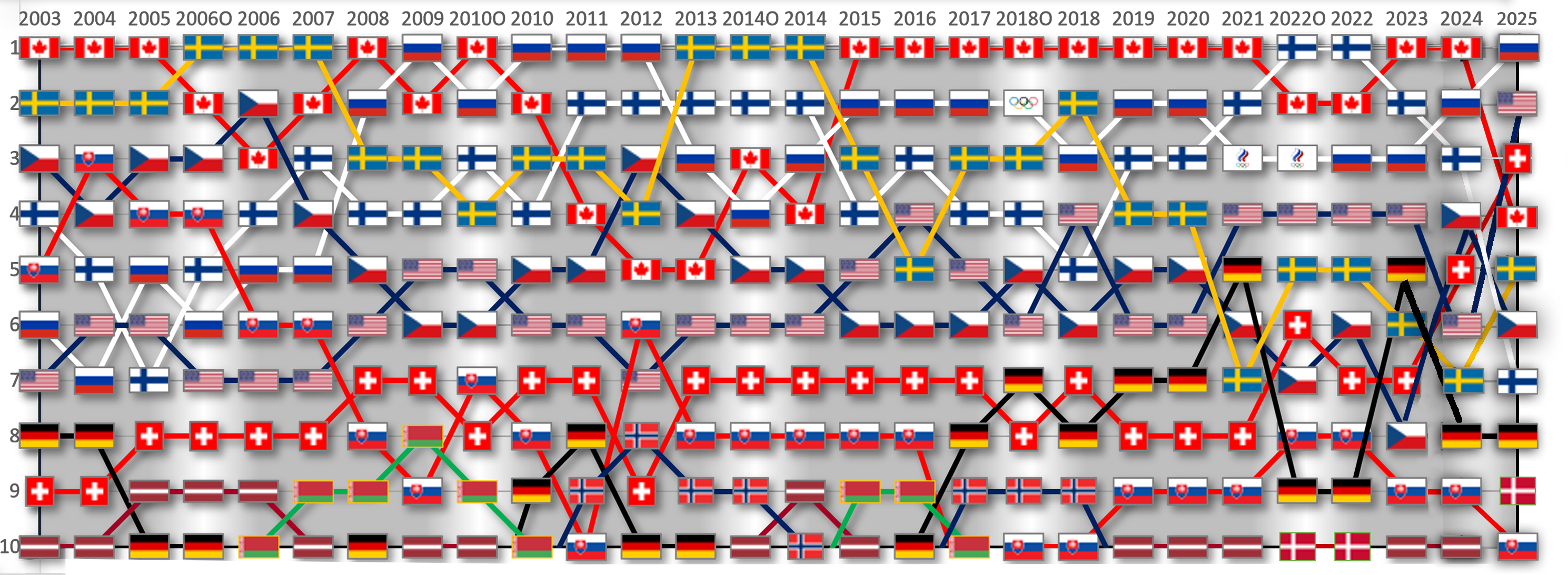
Graph of the evolution of the top ten men's nations (2003–2025)

Seven nations have achieved a top ten ranking every time (including Olympic rankings) between 2003–2023, they are (in order of average ranking): Canada, Sweden, Russia, Finland, Czech Republic, the United States, and Switzerland. An additional six nations, Slovakia (twenty-five times), Germany (nineteen times), Latvia (fifteen times), Belarus (nine times), Norway (eight times), and Denmark (twice) have been in the top ten at least once.

As of the 2024 IIHF World Championships, four countries have accomplished a first-place ranking: Canada fifteen times, Sweden six times, Russia four times, and Finland twice. Canada holds the record for highest cumulative point total in one ranking (4150 points in 2023), has the most consecutive first-place rankings (eight times between 2015 and 2021), and is the only nation to have achieved a top-five ranking every time.

Key
Year
Pts	Rk
Points	Rank

=== 2003–2010 ===
	2003		2004		2005		2006 O		2006		2007		2008		2009		2010 O		2010	
Team	Pts	Rk	Pts	Rk	Pts	Rk	Pts	Rk	Pts	Rk	Pts	Rk	Pts	Rk	Pts	Rk	Pts	Rk	Pts	Rk
Armenia	—	—	240	45	420	45	420	45	580	45	390	45	200	48	70	48	70	48	0	49
Australia	1080	36	1125	35	1195	34	1195	34	1215	34	1260	33	1300	33	1385	31	1385	34	1350	34
Austria	2970	12	2755	11	2430	13	3045	12	2930	16	2695	17	2445	16	2285	16	2955	14	2935	14
Belarus	2955	13	2590	13	2430	12	3035	13	3230	10	3025	9	2845	9	2660	8	3400	9	3360	10
Belgium	1240	33	1345	33	1255	32	1255	33	1200	35	1200	35	1230	34	1255	33	1255	36	1240	36
Bosnia and Herzegovina	—	—	—	—	—	—	—	—	—	—	—	—	200	47	150	47	150	47	100	48
Bulgaria	1550	30	1375	32	1235	33	1655	30	1715	30	1500	31	1305	32	1160	35	1540	31	1560	31
Canada	3685	1	3485	1	3220	1	3940	2	3890	3	3670	2	3410	1	3160	2	4105	1	3970	2
China	1805	28	1630	28	1515	28	1980	27	1970	28	1860	27	1650	28	1410	29	1260	35	1120	37
Croatia	1545	31	1425	31	1390	30	1970	28	2000	27	1850	28	1790	26	1675	26	2150	27	2125	26
Czech Republic	3560	3	3225	4	3065	3	3930	3	3985	2	3595	4	3265	5	2915	6	3655	6	3785	5
Denmark	2665	14	2575	14	2400	14	2990	15	3005	14	2855	12	2660	13	2445	13	3085	13	3185	13
Estonia	2135	24	1995	24	1860	24	2320	24	2325	24	2165	23	1930	25	1635	27	2155	26	2100	27
Finland	3525	4	3195	5	2865	7	3765	5	3830	4	3640	3	3385	4	3050	4	3880	3	3805	4
France	2575	18	2400	18	2150	17	2755	19	2720	19	2525	19	2410	18	2325	14	2860	16	2900	15
Germany	3240	8	2990	8	2580	10	3270	10	3110	12	2925	11	2740	10	2460	12	3145	12	3360	9
Great Britain	2230	23	1990	25	1780	25	1610	31	1580	31	1605	29	1645	29	1695	25	2335	24	2350	23
Greece	—	—	—	—	—	—	—	—	—	—	—	—	240	46	440	46	440	46	595	45
Hungary	2255	22	2060	22	1920	22	2460	22	2430	22	2320	21	2220	20	2130	20	2675	20	2655	20
Iceland	930	38	875	39	875	39	875	39	840	40	920	37	965	38	1030	37	1030	39	1095	38
Ireland	—	—	260	44	455	44	455	44	585	44	710	43	775	40	720	42	720	42	750	41
Israel	1110	35	1035	36	1140	35	1140	35	1275	33	1260	34	1190	35	1070	36	1070	38	970	39
Italy	2585	17	2315	19	2100	19	2820	17	2915	17	2815	13	2580	14	2290	15	2860	15	2860	16
Japan	2605	15	2440	15	2090	20	2625	21	2540	21	2305	22	2120	22	1965	21	2565	21	2575	21
Kazakhstan	2480	21	2410	17	2335	15	3100	11	3115	11	2740	16	2405	19	2165	18	2745	19	2790	17
North Korea	680	41	950	37	1105	36	1105	36	1105	36	660	44	645	44	705	43	705	43	730	43
South Korea	1420	32	1455	30	1360	31	1360	32	1320	32	1320	32	1365	31	1395	30	1395	33	1485	33
Latvia	3060	10	2900	10	2675	9	3335	9	3310	9	2995	10	2740	11	2610	10	3285	10	3265	12
Lithuania	1885	27	1720	27	1620	27	2085	26	2270	25	2105	25	1970	23	1810	23	2355	23	2300	24
Luxembourg	635	42	755	42	785	42	785	42	705	43	710	42	695	43	700	44	700	44	665	44
Mexico	820	39	770	41	775	43	775	43	845	39	915	38	1010	37	1025	38	1525	32	1520	32
Mongolia	—	—	—	—	—	—	—	—	—	—	260	46	415	45	515	45	515	45	540	46
Netherlands	2135	25	2015	23	1885	23	2400	23	2360	23	2155	24	1935	24	1755	24	2185	25	2210	25
New Zealand	800	40	870	40	910	38	910	38	925	38	900	39	890	39	850	39	850	40	925	40
Norway	2535	20	2265	21	2105	18	2760	18	2935	15	2780	14	2735	12	2545	11	3270	11	3305	11
Poland	2550	19	2295	20	2085	21	2635	20	2580	20	2395	20	2175	21	1940	22	2415	22	2405	22
Romania	1965	26	1845	26	1685	26	2195	25	2135	26	1970	26	1770	27	1605	28	2000	28	1945	28
Russia	3480	6	3105	7	2905	5	3725	6	3725	5	3535	5	3400	2	3200	1	3965	2	3980	1
Serbia	1685	29	1565	29	1420	29	1815	29	1745	29	1555	30	1425	30	1365	32	1810	29	1935	29
Slovakia	3480	5	3235	3	2965	4	3805	4	3685	6	3390	6	2955	8	2635	9	3470	7	3405	8
Slovenia	2595	16	2420	16	2295	16	2900	16	2870	18	2640	18	2460	15	2190	17	2755	18	2730	19
South Africa	990	37	930	38	845	40	845	40	830	41	770	41	755	42	790	40	790	41	735	42
Spain	1230	34	1170	34	1090	37	1090	37	1040	37	1090	36	1120	36	1165	34	1705	30	1790	30
Sweden	3610	2	3400	2	3095	2	4030	1	4095	1	3740	1	3400	3	3095	3	3855	4	3845	3
Switzerland	3135	9	2920	9	2715	8	3525	8	3500	8	3250	8	3020	7	2725	7	3465	8	3540	7
Turkey	625	43	690	43	795	41	795	41	775	42	830	40	765	41	750	41	1230	37	1265	35
Ukraine	3010	11	2720	12	2490	11	3015	14	3005	13	2740	15	2435	17	2135	19	2805	17	2760	18
United Arab Emirates	—	—	—	—	—	—	—	—	—	—	—	—	—	—	—	—	—	—	220	47
United States	3330	7	3145	6	2865	6	3575	7	3580	7	3375	7	3105	6	2915	5	3825	5	3650	6

=== 2011–2018 ===
	2011		2012		2013		2014O		2014		2015		2016		2017		2018O		2018	
Team	Pts	Rk	Pts	Rk	Pts	Rk	Pts	Rk	Pts	Rk	Pts	Rk	Pts	Rk	Pts	Rk	Pts	Rk	Pts	Rk
Australia	1350	34	1385	32	1330	32	1330	34	1300	34	1230	36	1160	36	1225	33	1225	38	1280	36
Austria	2730	15	2465	15	2265	15	2985	16	2950	16	2745	16	2440	17	2205	16	2750	17	2820	17
Belarus	3025	11	2705	13	2410	14	3030	15	3170	11	3075	9	2820	9	2535	10	3200	11	3085	14
Belgium	1180	35	1135	36	1210	34	1210	36	1215	36	1280	34	1300	32	1280	32	1280	36	1250	37
Bosnia and Herzegovina	50	48	—	—	—	—	—	—	—	—	200	47	410	45	295	47	295	47	360	48
Bulgaria	1405	32	1270	33	1070	37	940	39	870	39	890	39	870	39	825	40	1245	37	1210	38
Canada	3595	4	3255	5	2940	5	3840	3	3850	4	3690	1	3495	1	3225	1	4045	1	3990	1
China	1060	39	1040	38	1000	38	1000	38	980	38	1020	38	1075	37	1100	37	1540	33	1610	33
Croatia	1890	27	1665	30	1510	29	1895	30	2010	28	1930	27	1825	26	1675	26	2160	25	2115	27
Czech Republic	3570	5	3330	3	2975	4	3760	5	3745	5	3495	6	3210	6	2900	6	3740	5	3690	6
Denmark	2965	13	2710	12	2480	12	3050	13	3005	15	2775	15	2700	13	2495	14	3100	14	3130	12
Estonia	1940	26	1760	26	1610	28	2000	28	1985	29	1870	29	1755	28	1650	27	2110	27	2155	26
Finland	3630	2	3345	2	3065	2	3905	2	3955	2	3575	4	3355	3	3060	4	3820	4	3765	5
France	2765	14	2660	14	2450	13	3065	12	3165	12	2930	12	2655	14	2505	13	3145	12	3115	13
Georgia	—	—	—	—	180	48	180	48	355	47	495	45	335	47	455	45	855	41	990	40
Germany	3190	8	2885	10	2650	10	3260	11	3125	13	2920	13	2815	10	2660	8	3610	7	3575	8
Great Britain	2250	21	2110	21	1940	22	2540	20	2450	22	2225	24	2020	24	1850	24	2320	24	2465	22
Greece	640	44	625	44	610	44	610	44	360	46	180	49	60	49	—	—	—	—	—	—
Hong Kong	—	—	—	—	—	—	—	—	260	48	455	46	565	44	635	44	635	45	600	45
Hungary	2460	20	2265	19	2075	19	2595	19	2560	19	2415	19	2325	19	2095	19	2620	20	2595	20
Iceland	1125	36	1185	35	1240	33	1240	35	1295	35	1270	35	1240	35	1215	34	1695	32	1660	32
Ireland	785	41	735	42	705	42	705	42	410	44	195	48	65	48	—	—	—	—	—	—
Israel	885	40	875	40	960	39	1440	33	1530	32	1375	33	1250	34	1115	35	1455	35	1450	34
Italy	2605	17	2440	16	2210	18	2830	18	2860	18	2565	18	2345	18	2180	18	2735	19	2725	19
Japan	2245	22	2105	22	1960	21	2405	22	2470	21	2345	20	2140	21	1905	23	2465	22	2410	23
Kazakhstan	2615	16	2440	17	2225	16	2900	17	2910	17	2680	17	2470	16	2200	17	2800	16	2760	18
North Korea	485	45	540	45	600	45	600	45	675	43	770	42	825	40	885	39	885	40	925	41
South Korea	1605	31	1665	28	1740	25	2400	23	2415	23	2230	23	2090	23	2000	21	2735	18	2835	16
Kuwait	—	—	—	—	—	—	—	—	—	—	—	—	—	—	—	—	—	—	140	50
Latvia	2985	12	2765	11	2520	11	3295	10	3300	9	3015	10	2730	12	2520	12	3130	13	3225	11
Lithuania	2125	24	1905	25	1700	26	2145	26	2170	26	2035	26	1900	25	1755	25	2160	26	2200	25
Luxembourg	650	43	665	43	680	43	680	43	695	42	700	43	700	43	740	42	740	43	790	42
Mexico	1385	33	1230	34	1110	36	1505	32	1530	33	1400	32	1290	33	1110	36	1480	34	1440	35
Mongolia	315	46	375	46	415	46	415	46	260	49	155	50	50	50	—	—	—	—	—	—
Netherlands	2080	25	1925	24	1765	24	2355	24	2305	25	2065	25	1825	27	1625	28	2080	28	2060	28
New Zealand	1065	38	1125	37	1120	35	1120	37	1070	37	1045	37	1000	38	1015	38	1015	39	1030	39
Norway	3175	9	2960	8	2685	9	3350	9	3265	10	2990	11	2765	11	2535	9	3310	9	3270	9
Poland	2215	23	2020	23	1835	23	2350	25	2355	24	2275	22	2175	20	2030	20	2600	21	2565	21
Romania	1800	28	1725	27	1635	27	2075	27	2075	27	1895	28	1735	29	1565	29	2000	29	2030	29
Russia	3650	1	3425	1	3040	3	3840	4	3915	3	3675	2	3380	2	3105	2	4040	2	3930	3
Serbia	1755	30	1565	31	1375	31	1730	31	1740	31	1645	30	1520	31	1410	30	1825	30	1830	30
Slovakia	3130	10	3100	6	2840	8	3485	8	3445	8	3160	8	2870	8	2530	11	3220	10	3245	10
Slovenia	2565	18	2375	18	2215	17	3045	14	3040	14	2795	14	2530	15	2305	15	3010	15	2915	15
South Africa	740	42	780	41	790	41	790	41	845	40	855	40	815	41	725	43	725	44	655	44
Spain	1785	29	1665	29	1445	30	1910	29	1810	30	1645	31	1550	30	1375	31	1745	31	1700	31
Sweden	3630	3	3280	4	3105	1	4000	1	3990	1	3630	3	3275	5	3080	3	3850	3	3945	2
Switzerland	3240	7	2910	9	2845	7	3555	7	3470	7	3235	7	2910	7	2705	7	3405	8	3590	7
Chinese Taipei	—	—	—	—	—	—	—	—	—	—	—	—	—	—	220	48	220	48	425	46
Turkey	1110	37	1015	39	945	40	825	40	840	41	815	41	805	42	815	41	815	42	770	43
Turkmenistan	—	—	—	—	—	—	—	—	—	—	—	—	—	—	—	—	—	—	200	49
Ukraine	2495	19	2235	20	1970	20	2475	21	2500	20	2310	21	2105	22	1925	22	2425	23	2340	24
United Arab Emirates	165	47	110	47	275	47	275	47	405	45	510	44	340	46	370	46	370	46	365	47
United States	3340	6	3065	7	2895	6	3705	6	3740	6	3540	5	3290	4	2980	5	3725	6	3765	4

=== 2019–present ===
Team	2019		2020		2021		2022 O		2022		2023		2024		2025	
Team	Pts	Rk	Pts	Rk	Pts	Rk	Pts	Rk	Pts	Rk	Pts	Rk	Pts	Rk	Pts	Rk
Armenia	—	—	—	—	—	—	—	—	—	—	—	—	—	—	460	58
Australia	1305	35	1315	35	1265	33	1265	36	1310	36	1710	35	1970	35	2140	34
Austria	2635	15	2420	17	2185	18	2790	17	2900	15	3135	16	3340	13	3465	11
Belarus	2735	14	2545	13	2320	14	2940	14	2965	14	3175	14	3245	16	3205	NR
Belgium	1200	37	1150	36	1100	36	1100	39	1090	40	1470	40	1780	39	2050	35
Bosnia and Herzegovina	340	49	335	49	380	49	640	49	685	50	1040	48	1305	48	1495	47
Bulgaria	1095	38	1015	40	935	40	1210	37	1305	37	1655	36	1865	37	1965	36
Canada	3705	1	3470	1	3235	1	3995	2	3990	2	4150	1	4100	1	3935	3
China	1520	32	1420	32	1335	32	2125	27	2235	26	2535	26	2675	26	2680	25
Chinese Taipei	545	45	605	44	605	45	1045	40	1100	39	1455	41	1730	40	1875	38
Croatia	1895	29	1695	29	1515	30	1900	31	1910	31	2170	31	2350	32	2445	29
Czech Republic	3465	5	3200	5	2895	6	3580	7	3650	6	3735	8	3945	4	3860	5
Denmark	2925	12	2685	12	2470	12	3290	10	3335	10	3500	11	3500	11	3625	8
Estonia	2010	26	1860	27	1705	26	2135	26	2150	28	2400	28	2570	28	2635	26
Finland	3615	3	3345	3	3125	2	4065	1	4130	1	4080	2	3955	3	3780	6
France	2840	13	2540	14	2295	15	2945	13	3000	13	3240	13	3325	14	3255	14
Georgia	1060	39	1095	38	1035	38	935	43	1030	41	630	53	1125	50	1555	45
Germany	3355	7	3090	7	2905	5	3555	9	3555	9	3835	5	3865	8	3710	7
Great Britain	2480	20	2380	19	2280	16	2775	18	2755	18	2945	20	3095	17	3100	17
Hong Kong	535	46	490	48	460	48	740	46	770	47	1070	47	1275	49	1385	48
Hungary	2370	21	2160	21	1980	21	2585	21	2640	20	2950	19	3090	18	3170	15
Iceland	1485	33	1325	33	1200	35	1560	33	1605	34	1925	34	2110	34	2145	33
Indonesia	—	—	—	—	—	—	—	—	—	—	420	58	755	58	960	56
Iran	—	—	—	—	—	—	—	—	140	56	625	54	960	54	1070	54
Israel	1385	34	1320	34	1240	34	1545	34	1625	33	1950	33	2160	33	2220	31
Italy	2620	16	2480	15	2280	17	2830	16	2840	17	2970	18	3025	20	3025	18
Japan	2180	23	1975	24	1758	25	2285	25	2320	25	2580	25	2770	24	2860	20
Kazakhstan	2570	19	2420	16	2365	13	2860	15	2885	16	3170	15	3305	15	3265	13
Kuwait	225	50	280	51	305	51	545	51	500	52	770	50	980	52	1085	53
Kyrgyzstan	100	52	175	52	225	52	625	50	710	49	1095	46	1455	45	1685	41
Latvia	3025	10	2810	10	2560	10	3265	11	3255	11	3610	10	3660	10	3585	10
Lithuania	2110	24	1985	23	1850	23	2310	24	2385	23	2630	24	2735	25	2765	24
Luxembourg	745	43	705	43	690	43	990	41	985	44	1280	43	1520	44	1595	44
Malaysia	—	—	80	53	140	53	140	53	200	53	635	52	865	55	970	55
Mexico	1290	36	1150	37	1065	37	1300	35	1330	35	1600	37	1655	42	1625	43
Mongolia	—	—	—	—	—	—	—	—	—	—	460	57	825	57	1130	51
Netherlands	1910	28	1740	28	1590	28	1990	29	2000	29	2285	29	2445	29	2480	28
New Zealand	1020	40	1015	39	965	39	965	42	1010	42	1390	42	1715	41	1915	37
North Korea	905	41	860	41	825	41	825	45	845	45	510	56	840	56	1105	52
Norway	3005	11	2765	11	2490	11	3120	12	3105	12	3270	12	3380	12	3370	12
Philippines	—	—	60	54	105	54	105	54	175	54	600	55	965	53	1190	49
Poland	2300	22	2060	22	1885	22	2460	22	2480	22	2790	22	3010	21	2990	19
Romania	1990	27	1940	25	1820	24	2315	23	2375	24	2645	23	2825	23	2855	21
Russia	3640	2	3400	2	3050	3	3910	3	3935	3	4050	3	4065	2	4030	NR
Serbia	1740	30	1660	30	1540	29	1905	30	1970	30	2245	30	2375	31	2415	30
Singapore	—	—	—	—	40	55	40	55	150	55	650	51	995	51	1190	50
Slovakia	3040	9	2835	9	2670	9	3560	8	3590	8	3690	9	3750	9	3595	9
Slovenia	2620	18	2345	20	2085	20	2665	19	2730	19	2990	17	3090	19	3180	16
South Africa	595	44	545	46	540	46	540	52	560	51	1020	49	1325	47	1540	46
South Korea	2620	17	2385	18	2140	19	2635	20	2600	21	2805	21	2875	22	2820	23
Spain	1585	31	1470	31	1385	31	1775	32	1825	32	2140	32	2380	30	2495	27
Sweden	3615	4	3325	4	2880	7	3715	5	3675	5	3800	6	3910	7	3915	4
Switzerland	3325	8	3060	8	2815	8	3580	6	3590	7	3775	7	3945	5	3975	2
Thailand	160	51	280	50	340	50	680	47	785	46	1190	44	1530	43	1750	40
Turkey	760	42	750	42	745	42	1205	38	1250	38	1585	38	1785	38	1815	39
Turkmenistan	430	47	590	45	660	44	660	48	725	48	1140	45	1410	46	1625	42
Ukraine	2095	25	1875	26	1675	27	2125	28	2180	27	2470	27	2665	27	2820	22
United Arab Emirates	420	48	500	47	505	47	825	44	990	43	1505	39	1940	36	2200	32
United States	3430	6	3140	6	2945	4	3750	4	3775	4	3940	4	3945	6	3985	1
Uzbekistan	—	—	—	—	—	—	—	—	—	—	—	—	—	—	480	57

== Women's ==
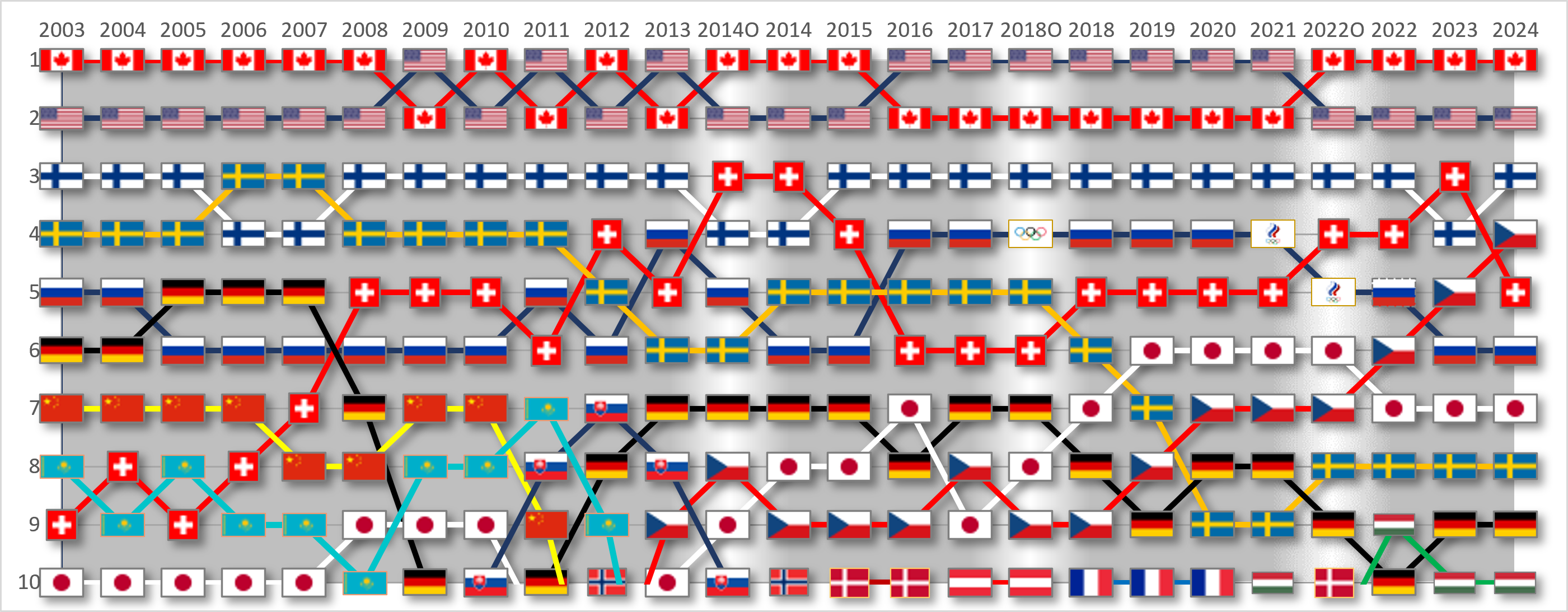
Graph of the evolution of the top ten women's nations (2003-2024)

Only six nations have achieved a top ten ranking every time between 2003–2022. These nations are (in order of average ranking): Canada, the United States, Finland, Sweden, Russia, and Switzerland. An additional ten nations, Germany (twenty-two times), Japan (twenty-one times), Czech Republic (thirteen times), Kazakhstan (ten times), China (nine times), Slovakia (five times), France (three times), Denmark (three times), Norway (twice), Austria (twice), and Hungary (twice) have been in the top ten at least once.

As of 2022, only two countries have accomplished a first-place ranking: Canada thirteen times and the United States ten times. Canada, Finland and the United States are the only nations to have achieved a top-four ranking every time, with Canada and the United States never falling below a top-two ranking.

In December 2017, six Russian women hockey players were found to have committed doping violations at the 2014 Winter Olympics. The IOC disqualified the Russian team from the 2014 hockey tournament and the IIHF was requested to modify the results accordingly. The information in this historical section does not reflect any changes that the IIHF may make in the record.

Key
Year
Pts	Rk
Points	Rank

=== 2003–2010 ===
	2003		2004		2005		2006		2007		2008		2009		2010	
Team	Pts	Rk	Pts	Rk	Pts	Rk	Pts	Rk	Pts	Rk	Pts	Rk	Pts	Rk	Pts	Rk
Australia	530	22	1270	21	1375	22	850	23	1205	23	1405	22	890	23	535	25
Austria	—	—	700	26	1285	25	920	21	1315	20	1580	19	1875	17	2040	16
Belgium	535	21	1175	22	1335	23	830	24	1160	24	1305	24	810	24	485	26
Bulgaria	—	—	—	—	—	—	—	—	—	—	—	—	—	—	720	24
Canada	1800	1	3000	1	2960	1	2970	1	2980	1	2950	1	2930	2	2950	1
China	1545	7	2565	7	2575	7	2485	7	2520	8	2510	8	2485	7	2515	7
Croatia	—	—	—	—	—	—	—	—	580	31	1095	30	785	25	1235	20
Czech Republic	670	11	1590	11	1840	11	2010	12	2195	13	2205	12	2180	12	2190	13
Denmark	635	16	1455	16	1700	14	1070	17	1485	17	1650	18	1760	19	1165	22
Estonia	—	—	—	—	—	—	—	—	520	32	910	32	650	32	390	33
Finland	1655	3	2775	3	2765	3	2760	4	2755	4	2770	3	2785	3	2795	3
France	660	12	1540	13	1780	12	1995	14	2230	12	2220	11	2170	13	2155	14
Germany	1565	6	2605	6	2625	5	2635	5	2585	5	2525	7	2420	10	2350	11
Great Britain	560	20	1280	20	1425	20	885	22	1210	22	1385	23	1645	20	1925	18
Hungary	505	24	1165	23	1320	24	825	25	1135	25	1265	25	785	26	470	27
Iceland	—	—	—	—	540	30	405	30	770	30	1090	31	685	29	415	29
Italy	585	18	1385	17	1610	17	2015	11	2160	14	2065	15	1980	16	1950	17
Japan	1425	10	2405	10	2380	10	2350	10	2345	10	2420	9	2465	9	2435	9
Kazakhstan	1490	8	2430	9	2475	8	2445	9	2445	9	2410	10	2475	8	2455	8
North Korea	650	13	1490	15	1635	16	1005	18	1380	19	1560	20	1775	18	1185	21
South Korea	—	—	600	27	1050	27	750	26	1070	26	1215	26	760	27	455	28
Latvia	645	15	1545	12	1750	13	1995	13	2250	11	2195	13	2135	14	2105	15
Netherlands	570	19	1330	19	1505	19	935	20	1300	21	1480	21	1645	21	1095	23
New Zealand	—	—	—	—	580	29	435	29	830	29	1110	27	690	28	415	30
Norway	650	14	1510	14	1695	15	1900	15	2145	15	2150	14	2195	11	2225	12
Romania	320	25	940	25	1185	26	730	27	995	27	1100	29	685	30	410	31
Russia	1620	5	2680	5	2605	6	2585	6	2565	6	2575	6	2610	6	2610	6
Slovakia	595	17	1375	18	1585	18	990	19	1415	18	1735	17	2040	15	2370	10
Slovenia	310	26	990	24	1385	21	1700	16	1865	16	1810	16	1075	22	1260	19
South Africa	505	23	505	28	790	28	465	28	910	28	1105	28	675	31	400	32
Sweden	1625	4	2725	4	2760	4	2830	3	2825	3	2760	4	2745	4	2735	4
Switzerland	1435	9	2435	8	2430	9	2480	8	2555	7	2645	5	2630	5	2640	5
Turkey	—	—	—	—	—	—	—	—	480	33	840	33	600	33	360	34
United States	1740	2	2900	2	2940	2	2890	2	2890	2	2930	2	2960	1	2950	2

=== 2011–2018 ===
	2011		2012		2013		2014 O		2014		2015		2016		2017		2018 O		2018	
Team	Pts	Rk	Pts	Rk	Pts	Rk	Pts	Rk	Pts	Rk	Pts	Rk	Pts	Rk	Pts	Rk	Pts	Rk	Pts	Rk
Australia	880	24	1205	24	1540	23	1025	27	1645	28	1495	29	1470	28	1485	27	1485	30	1535	30
Austria	2130	15	2185	15	2220	12	2190	13	3070	13	2905	12	2710	11	2530	10	3180	10	3180	11
Belgium	780	26	985	27	1220	31	805	31	1325	31	1280	31	765	36	840	37	840	37	910	38
Bulgaria	1000	23	705	33	870	33	460	34	900	34	980	34	1070	34	1055	35	1055	34	1010	35
Canada	2930	2	2960	1	2940	2	2960	1	4160	1	3840	1	3520	2	3210	2	4070	2	4060	2
China	2385	9	2235	13	2090	15	2115	14	2935	15	2685	16	2415	16	2180	17	2715	19	2665	20
Croatia	1375	20	1480	22	1535	24	1510	25	2110	25	1990	25	1850	25	1090	33	935	35	930	36
Czech Republic	2155	14	2245	12	2360	9	2400	8	3360	9	3140	9	2970	9	2740	8	3460	9	3470	9
Denmark	1370	21	1625	19	1970	17	2265	12	3185	11	2975	10	2740	10	2490	11	3135	13	3110	12
Estonia	130	37	—	—	—	—	—	—	—	—	—	—	—	—	—	—	—	—	—	—
Finland	2800	3	2780	3	2765	3	2715	4	3775	4	3535	3	3275	3	3035	3	3890	3	3910	3
France	2105	16	2055	16	2065	16	2055	16	2955	14	2830	14	2700	12	2455	13	3170	11	3205	10
Germany	2355	10	2430	8	2535	7	2565	7	3585	7	3315	7	2995	8	2830	7	3515	7	3475	8
Great Britain	1940	18	1955	17	1910	18	1915	19	2615	19	2375	21	2130	21	1910	23	2375	23	2365	23
Hong Kong	—	—	—	—	—	—	—	—	420	37	775	36	1015	35	1080	34	1660	29	1625	29
Hungary	835	25	1210	23	1585	22	1780	21	2580	21	2455	19	2365	17	2280	15	2920	14	2995	14
Iceland	705	29	960	29	1225	30	815	30	1355	30	1350	30	1370	30	1365	30	1365	32	1340	32
Ireland	420	36	315	36	650	35	435	35	435	36	220	37	110	38	—	—	—	—	—	—
Italy	1950	17	1915	18	1845	19	1890	20	2610	20	2435	20	2285	20	2105	19	2745	18	2810	17
Japan	2320	11	2285	11	2315	10	2395	9	3395	8	3230	8	3005	7	2720	9	3510	8	3555	7
Kazakhstan	2475	7	2350	9	2145	14	2110	15	2850	17	2515	18	2330	18	2180	18	2705	20	2695	19
North Korea	595	32	920	31	1340	26	960	29	1720	27	1890	27	1795	26	1715	25	1715	28	1670	28
South Korea	730	28	995	26	1310	28	1515	24	2195	24	2110	23	2020	23	1915	22	2755	17	2860	16
Latvia	2170	13	2195	14	2190	13	2055	17	2895	16	2695	15	2470	15	2240	16	2835	16	2785	18
Mexico	—	—	—	—	—	—	—	—	480	35	940	35	1215	32	1415	29	2055	26	2105	26
Netherlands	1265	22	1480	21	1750	20	1935	18	2715	18	2575	17	2330	19	2050	20	2580	21	2520	21
New Zealand	740	27	1110	25	1455	25	975	28	1615	29	1595	28	1470	29	1420	28	1420	31	1375	31
Norway	2280	12	2320	10	2280	11	2285	11	3225	10	2950	11	2690	13	2485	12	3155	12	3110	13
Poland	500	34	975	28	1340	27	1605	23	2265	22	2150	22	2055	22	1950	21	2475	22	2500	22
Romania	675	30	405	34	270	36	135	36	135	38	—	—	480	37	860	36	860	36	1095	33
Russia	2670	5	2650	6	2710	4	2675	5	3715	6	3480	6	3265	4	2970	4	3810	4	3830	4
Slovakia	2470	8	2500	7	2430	8	2325	10	3185	12	2855	13	2590	14	2340	14	2920	15	2910	15
Slovenia	1385	19	1505	20	1615	21	1630	22	2210	23	2015	24	1875	24	1735	24	2185	24	2190	24
South Africa	645	31	890	32	1135	32	755	32	1215	32	1160	32	1125	33	1105	32	1105	33	1080	34
Spain	480	35	940	30	1255	29	1505	26	2065	26	1910	26	1755	27	1600	26	2115	25	2125	25
Sweden	2700	4	2680	5	2620	6	2660	6	3760	5	3485	5	3210	5	2915	5	3660	5	3615	6
Switzerland	2620	6	2685	4	2665	5	2720	3	3840	3	3520	4	3180	6	2865	6	3645	6	3655	5
Chinese Taipei	—	—	—	—	—	—	—	—	—	—	—	—	—	—	480	38	480	38	920	37
Turkey	560	33	330	35	700	34	470	33	970	33	1095	33	1230	31	1260	31	1860	27	1860	27
United States	2970	1	2940	2	2960	1	2940	2	4100	2	3830	2	3560	1	3280	1	4190	1	4200	1

=== 2019–present ===
Team	2019		2020		2021		2022 O		2022		2023		2024	
Team	Pts	Rk	Pts	Rk	Pts	Rk	Pts	Rk	Pts	Rk	Pts	Rk	Pts	Rk
Australia	1535	29	1480	29	1435	29	1435	33	1405	33	1780	31	2065	31
Austria	2910	12	2640	14	2385	14	3070	13	3050	14	3245	13	3315	15
Belgium	995	37	1080	36	1040	37	1040	39	1075	39	1610	36	2030	32
Bosnia and Herzegovina	—	—	—	—	300	42	300	42	525	42	1055	41	1375	43
Bulgaria	975	38	955	38	925	39	1465	32	1510	32	1755	33	1880	36
Canada	3730	2	3450	2	3210	2	4120	1	4160	1	4250	1	4270	1
China	2460	20	2250	19	2045	20	2815	17	2890	16	3210	14	3425	12
Chinese Taipei	1235	33	1410	30	1400	29	2020	26	2095	26	2380	26	2550	26
Croatia	995	36	1080	35	1200	33	1200	35	1220	36	1615	35	1790	37
Czech Republic	3270	8	3030	7	2795	7	3575	7	3675	6	3890	5	3965	4
Denmark	2910	11	2750	11	2555	11	3275	10	3290	11	3420	11	3490	11
Estonia	—	—	—	—	320	41	320	41	580	41	1155	40	1505	40
Finland	3675	3	3390	3	3100	3	3940	3	3850	3	3920	4	3975	3
France	3015	10	2760	10	2535	12	3185	12	3175	12	3375	12	3415	13
Germany	3250	9	3000	8	2740	8	3365	9	3325	10	3515	9	3650	9
Great Britain	2190	23	2005	23	1825	24	2380	23	2410	23	2680	23	2855	21
Hong Kong	1445	30	1225	33	1155	34	1570	30	1530	30	1860	30	2135	30
Hungary	2875	14	2720	12	2560	10	3275	11	3340	9	3515	10	3520	10
Iceland	1350	32	1345	31	1325	31	1925	27	1970	27	2280	27	2470	28
Israel	—	—	—	—	—	—	—	—	280	44	910	44	1345	44
Italy	2655	17	2445	17	2250	16	2840	16	2800	17	2955	18	3025	19
Japan	3290	6	3070	6	2840	6	3620	6	3650	7	3775	7	3775	7
Kazakhstan	2470	19	2225	21	2000	21	2475	21	2500	21	2705	22	2795	23
Latvia	2490	18	2195	22	1955	22	1760	29	1720	29	2110	29	2505	27
Lithuania	—	—	360	40	610	40	1130	36	1395	34	1780	32	1965	34
Mexico	2000	26	1865	26	1710	26	2190	25	2190	25	2450	25	2605	25
Netherlands	2415	21	2315	18	2155	18	2715	19	2775	18	3040	17	3170	17
New Zealand	1355	31	1335	32	1295	32	1295	34	1310	35	1705	34	1985	33
North Korea	1605	28	1555	28	1520	27	1520	31	1520	31	915	43	1420	42
Norway	2895	13	2660	13	2425	13	3040	14	3060	13	3205	15	3340	14
Poland	2390	22	2235	20	2070	19	2655	20	2700	20	2920	20	2955	20
Romania	1205	34	1120	34	1095	35	1095	37	1065	40	1415	39	1725	39
Russia	3560	4	3290	4	2985	4	3770	5	3780	5	3885	6	3880	6
Serbia	—	—	—	—	—	—	—	—	320	43	960	42	1480	41
Singapore	—	—	—	—	—	—	—	—	—	—	—	—	660	46
Slovakia	2720	15	2510	15	2305	15	2925	15	2960	15	3125	16	3175	16
Slovenia	2105	24	2000	24	1860	23	2385	22	2430	22	2705	21	2845	22
South Africa	1060	35	1070	37	1060	36	1060	38	1155	37	1610	37	1900	35
South Korea	2680	16	2455	16	2230	17	2760	18	2705	19	2935	19	3080	18
Spain	2035	25	1905	25	1760	25	2290	24	2320	24	2560	24	2695	24
Sweden	3275	7	2920	9	2640	9	3385	8	3440	8	3665	8	3750	8
Switzerland	3415	5	3170	5	2955	5	3790	4	3820	4	3965	3	3960	5
Thailand	—	—	—	—	—	—	—	—	—	—	—	—	720	45
Turkey	1725	27	1565	27	1485	28	1915	28	1930	28	2115	28	2275	29
Ukraine	440	39	790	39	945	38	945	40	1085	38	1470	38	1780	38
United States	3900	1	3600	1	3260	1	4120	2	4090	2	4220	2	4210	2

== Notes ==
Most of the tournaments in 2020 and 2021 were cancelled due to the COVID-19 pandemic. As a result, teams were awarded points based on their seeding for their respective tournaments. The Championship divisions received points based on the previous year's ranking, while the remaining divisions received points based on the previous year's results, with the exception of the Women's Divisions IIB and III which were completed and scored as scheduled in 2020. For a fairer ranking and point distribution, the IIHF Council decided that the points for 2021 in case of tournament cancellations are given according to the ranking position of each team in the 2021 Pre-Championship Report – taking into consideration the results in 2018, 2019 and 2020 – rather than by seeding as in the past.

For the 2022 Winter Olympics, Russia was still under a 2019 ban by the World Anti-Doping Agency (WADA) because of that country's state-sponsored doping scheme. On 19 February 2021, the International Olympic Committee announced that individual athletes from Russia, who had consistently passed ongoing anti-doping tests, could compete under the acronym "ROC" (the full name "Russian Olympic Committee" could not be displayed), and that the flag of the Russian Olympic Committee would be used for the COVID-19 pandemic-delayed 2020 Summer Olympics and the unchanged 2022 Winter Olympics.
