= Shin So-jung =

South Korean ice hockey player

- Born: March 4, 1990 (age 36) Seoul, South Korea
- Height: 165 cm (5 ft 5 in)
- Weight: 70 kg (154 lb; 11 st 0 lb)
- Position: Goaltender
- Caught: Left
- Played for: Ice Beat; New York Riveters; St. Francis Xavier
- Current coach: South Korea
- Coached for: St. Francis Xavier
- National team: South Korea and Korea
- Playing career: 2010–2018
- Coaching career: 2019–present
Medal record
Representing South Korea
World Championship D2
Bronze medal – third place	2012 Korea
Gold medal – first place	2013 Spain
Bronze medal – third place	2014 Italy

- Shin So-jung
- Hangul: 신소정
- RR: Sin Sojeong
- MR: Sin Sojŏng

Shin So-jung (born March 4, 1990) is a South Korean retired ice hockey goaltender and former member of the South Korean women's national ice hockey team and the Korean Unified women's ice hockey team, currently serving as an assistant coach to the South Korean national team. She was the first Korean to play professional women's ice hockey in North America, as a member of the New York Riveters in the 2016–17 season of the National Women's Hockey League (NWHL; renamed PHF in 2021).

== Playing career ==
=== CIS ===
Shin played for three seasons with the St. Francis Xavier women's ice hockey program in Canadian Interuniversity Sport. During her seasons with the X-Women, she registered 37 wins, complemented by a 1.46 goals against average, and a save percentage of .944.

In her first season at St. Francis Xavier, she ranked first overall in Atlantic University Sport conference play with a 1.44 goals against average, while her .930 save percentage ranked second.

During the 2014–15 season, Shin led all goaltenders in Canadian Interuniversity Sport play with a .875 winning percentage. In addition, she led all goaltenders in the Atlantic University Sport conference in both save percentage (.949) and goals against average (1.19).

=== NWHL ===
On July 27, 2016, Shin signed as a free agent with the NWHL’s New York Riveters. She played four games with the Riveters, earning one shutout.

=== International ===
As a member of the South Korean national women's ice hockey team, Shin has participated in seven IIHF World Championships at the Division II and Division III levels. Throughout the seven appearances, she has accumulated a goals against average of 1.33 plus a .954 save percentage. In addition, she has participated in two Asian Winter Games, two IIHF Women's Challenge Cup of Asia tournaments, and the qualification round for Ice hockey at the 2014 Winter Olympics.

She was at the 2018 Winter Olympics as part of a unified team of 35 players drawn from both North and South Korea. The team's coach was Sarah Murray and the team was in Group B competing against Switzerland, Japan and Sweden.

In June 2018, she announced her retirement from hockey.

== Career statistics ==
=== International ===
Note: GP = Games played; Min, TOI = Minutes played; W = Wins; L = Losses; T,T/OT = Ties; OTL = Overtime losses; GA = Goals-against; GAA = Goals-against average; SO = Shutouts; SV% = Save percentage;

				Regular season
Year	Team	Event	Result	GP	W	L	T/OT	MIN	GA	SO	GAA	SV%
2018	Korea	OG	8th	5	0	5	0	295:10	26	0	5.29	0.890

== Awards and honors ==
- Directorate Award, Best Goaltender: 2012 IIHF Women's World Championship Division II, Group B
- Directorate Award, Best Goaltender: 2013 IIHF Women's World Championship Division II, Group B
- Directorate Award, Best Goaltender: 2014 IIHF Women's World Championship Division II, Group A
- 2015 Atlantic University Sport First-Team All-Star
- St. Francis Xavier women's ice hockey Most Valuable Player (2015)
