= Franciska Kiss-Simon =

Hungarian ice hockey player (born 1995)

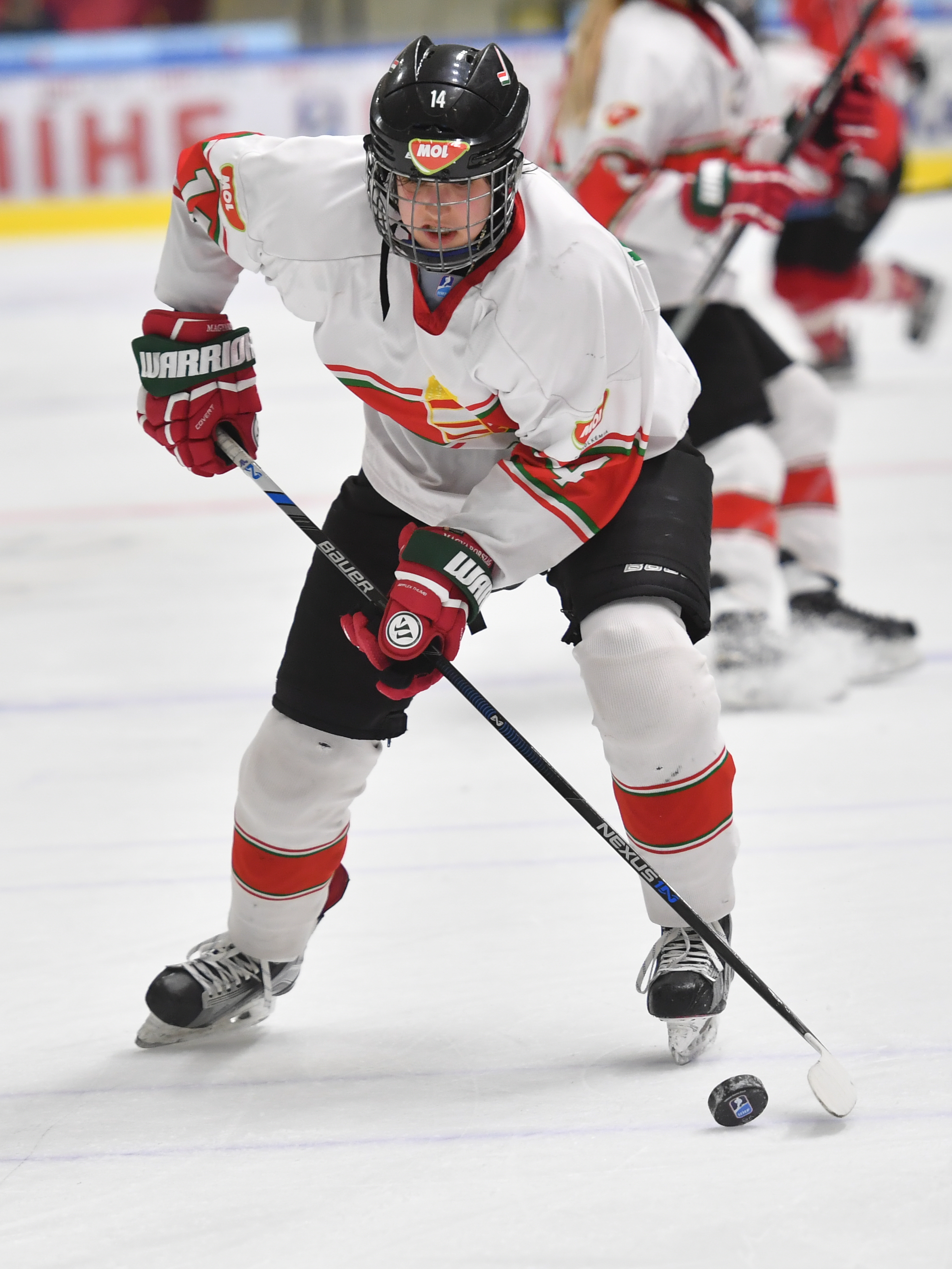
- Kiss-Simon representing Hungary at the 2017 World Championship Division 1A
- Born: 7 November 1995 (age 30) Budapest, Hungary
- Height: 180 cm (5 ft 11 in)
- Weight: 73 kg (161 lb; 11 st 7 lb)
- Position: Defense
- Shoots: Left
- EWHL team Former teams: HK Budapest: KMH Budapest; SKIF Nizhny Novgorod; Fakel Chelyabinsk
- National team: Hungary
- Playing career: 2012–present

Franciska Kiss-Simon (born 7 November 1995) is a Hungarian ice hockey player and member of the Hungarian national team. She plays in the European Women's Hockey League (EWHL) with Hokiklub Budapest.

Kiss-Simon has represented Hungary at the Top Division tournaments of the IIHF Women's World Championship in 2021, 2022, and 2023, at three Division I Group A tournaments, and at two Division I Group B tournaments.

== Career statistics ==
As of May 2022

=== International ===
Year	Team	Event	Result	GP	G	A	Pts	PIM
2011	Hungary U18	WW18 D1Q	1st	5	1	9	10	2
2012	Hungary U18	WW18 D1	1st	5	1	1	2	0
2012	Hungary	WW D2A	2nd	5	2	4	6	6
2012	Hungary	OGQ	DNQ	3	0	4	4	0
2013	Hungary U18	WW18	6th	5	0	1	1	4
2013	Hungary	WW D2A	1st	5	0	3	3	6
2014	Hungary	WW D1B	3rd	5	1	1	2	2
2015	Hungary	WW D1B	4th	5	2	0	2	4
2017	Hungary	WW D1A	5th	5	0	2	2	0
2018	Hungary	WW D1A	3rd	5	0	1	1	0
2019	Hungary	WW D1A	1st	5	0	3	3	0
2021	Hungary	WW	9th	4	0	0	0	0
2021	Hungary	OGQ	DNQ	3	0	1	1	0
Junior totals				15	2	11	13	6
Senior totals				29	5	14	19	18
