= Georgia Moore =

Australian ice hockey defender

- Born: April 8, 1987 (age 38)
- Height: 163 cm (5 ft 4 in)
- Position: Defence
- Shoots: Right
- AWIHL team Former teams: Melbourne Ice; Strathmore Rockies
- National team: Australia
- Playing career: 2003–present

Georgia Moore (born April 8, 1987) is an Australian ice hockey defender whose athletic career has spanned multiple sports and international competitions. She made history in 2013 by becoming the first Australian player ever selected in the CWHL Draft, going 61st overall to the Calgary Inferno. This milestone not only highlighted her talent and determination but also marked a significant moment for the visibility of Australian women in elite international ice hockey.

Domestically, Moore achieved great success with the Melbourne Ice, winning the prestigious Joan McKowen Memorial Trophy, the top prize in Australian women’s ice hockey, twice during her tenure. Her leadership, defensive strength, and consistency on the ice made her a key player in the team's championship campaigns, helping to elevate the standard and profile of women's hockey in Australia.

In addition to her ice hockey accomplishments, Moore is also a multi-sport athlete. She competed in Canadian football, playing as part of the Okotoks Lady Outlawz as a slotback in the Western Women's Canadian Football League, showcasing her versatility and athleticism across disciplines. Furthermore, she has represented Australia on the international stage in inline hockey, further underlining her dedication to team sports and her ability to excel at a high level in various competitive environments. Moore's career is a testament to her passion, adaptability, and trailblazing role in women's sports both in Australia and abroad.
