= Croatia women's national ice hockey team =

Croatia
- Association: Croatian Ice Hockey Federation
- General manager: Danijel Kolombo
- Head coach: Ivan Gašljević
- Assistants: Matija Ratkaj
- Captain: Diana Stolar
- Most games: Diana Krušelj Posavec (61)
- Top scorer: Diana Krušelj Posavec (81)
- Most points: Diana Krušelj Posavec (102)
- IIHF code: CRO

Ranking
- Current IIHF: 36 (3 June 2026)
- Highest IIHF: 20 (first in 2010)
- Lowest IIHF: 36 (first in 2018)

First international
- Hungary 3–2 Croatia (Budapest, Hungary; 24 February 2007)

Biggest win
- Croatia 30–1 Bulgaria (Liepāja, Latvia; 3 September 2008)

Biggest defeat
- Denmark 20–1 Croatia (Barcelona, Spain; 14 October 2012); Australia 19–0 Croatia (Cape Town, South Africa; 23 February 2023)

World Championships
- Appearances: 16 (first in 2007)
- Best result: 24th (2008, 2011)

International record (W–L–T)
- 33–62–0

The Croatian women's national ice hockey team represents Croatia at the International Ice Hockey Federation's IIHF World Women's Championships. The women's national team is controlled by Croatian Ice Hockey Federation. As of 2011, Croatia has 39 female players. Croatia is ranked 33rd in the IIHF World Ranking.

== History ==
Seeing that in Croatia (by status since January 2008) there is only one women's ice hockey club Grič its players are also the only members of the national team. From season 2006/2007 Grič players have been participating in the Slovenian league, along with one Slovenian and one Austrian club.

For several years they have also been participating in an Elite Women's Hockey League with clubs established in the hockey-playing countries (Czech Republic, Slovakia, Germany, Austria and Slovenia).

== Tournament record ==
=== Olympic Games ===
The women's team of Croatia has never qualified for an Olympic tournament. In 2008 the team participated in the qualifying tournament for the Winter Olympic Games 2010 in Vancouver. They lost to Slovakia, Latvia and Italy and beat Bulgaria. They won 4th place. At the 2014 qualifying tournament they lost to Spain, Hungary and Denmark and failed to qualify for the next round.

=== World Championships ===
In 2007 the Croatian team was the first time involved in the World Championship competition. In the Division IV the team achieved a big surprise by winning the first place in Division IV and was promoted in the Division III.

Records
| Year | World Championship |
|---|---|
| 2007 | Finished 28th (1st in Division IV and promoted to Division III) |
| 2008 | Finished 24th (3rd in Division III) |
| 2009 | Division III Cancelled |
| 2011 | Finished 24th (5th in Division III) |
| 2012 | Finished 26th (6th in Division IIA and relegated to Division IIB) |
| 2013 | Finished 29th (3rd in Division IIB) |
| 2014 | Finished 27th (1st in Division IIB and promoted to Division IIA) |
| 2015 | Finished 25th (5th in Division IIA) |
| 2016 | Finished 26th (6th in Division IIA and relegated to Division IIB) |
| 2017 | Did not participate |
| 2018 | Finished 34th (1st in Division IIBQ and promoted to Division IIB) |
| 2019 | Finished 33rd (5th in Division IIB) |
| 2020 | Finished 33rd (5th in Division IIB) |
| 2021 | Cancelled due to the COVID-19 pandemic |
| 2022 | Finished 31st (5th in Division IIB) |
| 2023 | Finished 32nd (5th in Division IIB and relegated to Division IIIA) |
| 2024 | Finished 39th (5th in Division IIIA) |
| 2025 | Finished 37th (5th in Division IIIA) |
| 2026 | Finished 38th (4th in Division IIIA) |

== All-time Record against other nations ==
As of 14 September 2011

| Team | GP | W | T | L | GF | GA |
|---|---|---|---|---|---|---|
| Belgium | 2 | 2 | 0 | 0 | 5 | 1 |
| Hungary | 4 | 2 | 0 | 2 | 10 | 20 |
| Bulgaria | 1 | 1 | 0 | 0 | 30 | 1 |
| Turkey | 1 | 1 | 0 | 0 | 19 | 1 |
| Estonia | 1 | 1 | 0 | 0 | 12 | 0 |
| Iceland | 1 | 1 | 0 | 0 | 3 | 0 |
| New Zealand | 1 | 1 | 0 | 0 | 4 | 3 |
| Romania | 1 | 1 | 0 | 0 | 3 | 2 |
| South Korea | 1 | 0 | 0 | 1 | 2 | 3 |
| Great Britain | 1 | 0 | 0 | 1 | 4 | 8 |
| Australia | 1 | 0 | 0 | 1 | 1 | 5 |
| Italy | 1 | 0 | 0 | 1 | 0 | 8 |
| Latvia | 1 | 0 | 0 | 1 | 0 | 9 |
| Netherlands | 1 | 0 | 0 | 1 | 0 | 9 |
| Slovakia | 1 | 0 | 0 | 1 | 0 | 18 |
| Slovenia | 3 | 0 | 0 | 3 | 6 | 18 |
