= Sarah Shantz-Smiley =

Canadian-born Icelandic ice hockey player and coach

- Born: 24 August 1982 (age 43) Toronto, Ontario, Canada
- Height: 165 cm (5 ft 5 in)
- Weight: 60 kg (132 lb; 9 st 6 lb)
- Position: Right wing
- Shot: Right
- IWHL team Former teams: Skautafélag Akureyrar; Windsor Lancers; Montreal Axion
- National team: Iceland
- Playing career: 2005–2020

Sarah Shantz-Smiley (born 24 August 1982) is a Canadian-born Icelandic ice hockey coach and former player. She was a member of the Iceland women's national team 2011, the same year she was named the Icelandic Women's Ice Hockey Player of the Year, to 2020.

== Playing career ==
Having played for the University of Windsor in Canadian Interuniversity Sport (now U Sports), Shantz-Smiley graduated in 2005. Following university, she competed with the now-defunct Montreal Axion in the original National Women's Hockey League. During the 2005–06 NWHL season, Smiley appeared in 35 games, logging 4 goals (of which three were game-winning goals) and 4 assists for 8 points.

In 2006, she signed on to play in the Icelandic Women's Hockey League.

In 2008, Shantz-Smiley would play for a club team in Australia. Smiley has also played for the Iceland national women's team competing in Group B at the 2012 IIHF Women's World Championship Division II in Seoul, South Korea. During Iceland's first game of the event, Shantz-Smiley earned an assist on a goal scored by Birna Baldursdóttir.

== Coaching career ==
In December 2006, Shantz-Smiley was hired as the head coach of the Iceland women's national team. In 2008, she became the first woman to be the head coach of a men's Ice Hockey team in Iceland when she was hired as the head coach of Skautafélag Akureyrar men's team. Shantz-Smiley also spent team coaching a youth team in the community of Akureyri in 2010.

In 2011, Iceland was ranked 29th in the world, and was the host country for the 2011 IIHF Women's World Championship Division IV. During that same year, Smiley worked with Deirdre Norman from the Women of Winter hockey organization in Toronto and helped launch a women's division in the Iceland International Ice Hockey Tournament.

== Personal ==
Shantz-Smiley received an Icelandic citizenship in 2011.
