= Australia women's national ice hockey team =

Australia
- Nickname: Aussie Flyers
- Association: Ice Hockey Australia
- General manager: Jennifer Binetti
- Head coach: Pier Martin
- Assistants: Graham Hyde; Mark Rummukainen
- Captain: Stephenie Cochrane
- Most games: Shona Green (66)
- Top scorer: Michelle Clark-Crumpton (32)
- Most points: Sharna Godfrey (60)
- Team colors
- IIHF code: AUS

Ranking
- Current IIHF: 28 (3 June 2026)
- Highest IIHF: 21 (2004)
- Lowest IIHF: 33 (2022)

First international
- Netherlands 2–0 Australia (Hungary; 22 March 2000)

Biggest win
- Australia 19–0 Croatia (Cape Town, South Africa; 23 February 2023)

Biggest defeat
- Denmark 12–1 Australia (Vierumäki, Finland; 29 March 2008)

World Championships
- Appearances: 22 (first in 2000)
- Best result: 20th (2004)

International record (W–L–T)
- 78–54–2

The Australian women's national ice hockey team represents Australia at the International Ice Hockey Federation's IIHF World Women's Championships. The women's national team is controlled by Ice Hockey Australia. As of 2025, Australia has 1302 registered female players. Australia is ranked 29th out of 46 countries in the IIHF World Ranking. Kathy Berg took the team to its highest point, being ranked 20th. She was the longest serving coach. In 2020, Australia won Gold at the D2B Championships held in Iceland, however, due to COVID were not promoted. Led by current head coach, Marcus Wong, the team secured Gold at the 2025 IIHF Women's World Championship, Division II Group B in Dunedin, New Zealand. With the win, the Australians are promoted to Division II, Group A for 2026.

== History ==
In 2000 Australia first competed in the qualification tournament held for the right to participate in the 2001 Division I championships. Australia lost all three of their group matches and finished seventh out of eight after beating South Africa in the seventh place game. The following year Australia again played in the qualification tournament in order to be promoted to Division I for the 2003 championships. Australia finished third in the group of five which saw Slovakia promoted to Division I for 2003.

In 2003 the International Ice Hockey Federation (IIHF) introduced a new format for the World Championships with the inclusion of second and third division. Australia was placed in the third division and gained promotion to the 2004 Division II tournament after winning four of their five games and finishing on top of the standings. The 2004 World Championships saw Australia relegated along with Great Britain from Division II to Division III for the 2005 tournament.

At the 2005 World Championships Australia competed in Division III and narrowly avoided relegation to Division IV after finishing fifth out of six teams, beating only South Africa. The next World Championship in 2007, Australia improved, again gaining promotion to Division II for the next years tournament. Promotion to Division II however was again short as Australia finished last in the 2007 tournament and were relegated back to Division III.

== Olympic record ==
Australia's ice hockey team has never qualified for an Olympic tournament.

== World Championships record ==
- 2000 – 23rd place
- 2001 – 21st place
- 2003 – 21st place (1st in Division III, Promoted to Division II)
- 2004 – 20th place (5th in Division II, Demoted to Division III)
- 2005 – 25th place (5th in Division III)
- 2007 – 22nd place (1st in Division III, Promoted to Division II)
- 2008 – 21st place (6th in Division II, Demoted to Division III)
- 2011 – 21st place (2nd in Division III)
- 2012 – 23rd place (3rd in Division IIA)
- 2013 – 23rd place (3rd in Division IIA)
- 2014 – 26th place (6th in Division IIA, Demoted to Division IIB)
- 2015 – 31st place (5th in Division IIB)
- 2016 – 27th place (1st in Division IIB, Promoted to Division IIA)
- 2017 – 26th place (6th in Division IIA)
- 2018 – 25th place (4th in Division IIA)
- 2019 – 28th place (6th in Division IIA, Demoted to Division IIB)
- 2020 – 29th place (1st in Division IIB, Promoted to Division IIA)
- 2021 – Cancelled due to the COVID-19 pandemic
- 2022 – 28th place (2nd in Division IIB)
- 2023 – 29th place (2nd in Division IIB)
- 2024 – 30th place (2nd in Division IIB)
- 2025 – 29th place (1st in Division IIB)
- 2026 – 26th place (4th in Division IIA)
