= Jo Su-sie =

South Korean ice hockey player

- Born: September 9, 1994 (age 32) South Korea
- Height: 162 cm (5 ft 4 in)
- Weight: 55 kg (121 lb; 8 st 9 lb)
- Position: Forward
- Shot: Left
- Played for: Ice Beat
- National team: South Korea and Korea
- Playing career: 2012–2019

Jo Su-sie (born 9 September 1994) is a South Korean former ice hockey player. She competed in the 2018 Winter Olympics. In 2026, she was elected as the Asian Regional Vice President of the International Ice Hockey Federation.
