= Anna Goulding =

New Zealand ice hockey defender

- Born: September 24, 1992 (age 33) Waikaia, New Zealand
- Height: 160 cm (5 ft 3 in)
- Position: Right
- National team: New Zealand
- Playing career: 2010–2017

Anna Goulding (born September 24, 1992) is a retired New Zealand ice hockey defender who represented the New Zealand women's national ice hockey team from 2010 to 2015 and was named team captain in her final year.

Following her initial international stint, Goulding pursued opportunities overseas to further her development in the sport. During the 2015–2016 season, she played in Sweden for two top-level clubs: Leksands IF in the SDHL, one of Europe's most competitive women's leagues, and AIK Hockey in the Nationella Damhockeyligan. Her experience in Europe added depth and international exposure to her game. After that season, she returned to the New Zealand national team for the 2016–2017 campaign, contributing her experience and skills one last time before stepping away from international competition. Even after retiring from the global stage, Goulding remained active in the sport at the club and community levels. Notably, she played for the Dunedin Thunder Women’s team during the 2020–2021 season, continuing to support the development of women's ice hockey in New Zealand.

Her strong performance on the ice, combined with her extensive international experience, caught the attention of scouts and coaches in North America, leading to her selection as the 73rd overall pick in the 2017 CWHL Draft, following her time training and studying at York University in Toronto, where she further developed her skills while gaining valuable exposure to the Canadian hockey system. Goulding’s career reflects a dedication to advancing women's ice hockey, both at home and abroad, and she remains a role model for aspiring players in New Zealand.
