= Ice hockey at the 2018 Winter Olympics – Women's qualification =

Qualification for the women's tournament at the 2018 Winter Olympics determined by the IIHF World Ranking following the 2016 Women's Ice Hockey World Championships. The top five teams in the World Ranking received automatic berths into the Olympics, South Korea has received an automatic berth as host, and all other member nations had an opportunity to qualify for the remaining two spots.

== Qualified teams ==
Event	Date	Location	Vacancies	Qualified
Hosts	19 September 2014	(Spain) Tenerife	1	South Korea
2016 IIHF World Ranking	7 December 2012 – 10 April 2016	(Canada) Kamloops	5	United States; Canada; Finland; Russia; Sweden
Final qualification tournament	9–12 February 2017	(Switzerland) Arosa	1	Switzerland
Final qualification tournament	9–12 February 2017	(Japan) Tomakomai	1	Japan
TOTAL			8	

Notes

1. ^{a} After talks in Panmunjom on 17 January 2018, a unified Korean team consisting of players from both North Korea and South Korea was created to compete at the 2018 Winter Olympics.
2. ^{b} The 2016 IIHF World Ranking includes the following events: 2013 World Championship, 2014 Winter Olympic Games, 2014 World Championship, 2015 World Championship and 2016 World Championship
3. ^{c} Kamloops was the site for 2016 IIHF Women's World Championship; at the conclusion of the tournament the ranking was finalized with regards to the qualification slots.
4. ^{d} In December 2017, the IOC suspended the Russian Olympic Committee from competing at the Winter Olympics as part of its sanctions following state-sponsored doping allegations. Russian athletes deemed clean were permitted to compete as Olympic Athletes from Russia.

== Qualification seeding ==
To qualify directly, a nation had to be ranked in the top five following the 2016 IIHF Women's World Championship. Using the IIHF World Ranking points system, the 2016 received full value, and each preceding year was worth 25% less. Teams that wished to compete must apply in "early spring of 2016". The following is a ranking based on points accumulated toward Olympic qualification of all countries.

Points were earned based on overall finish, available points for 2016 were as follows:

Place	1	2	3	4	5	6	7	8	9	10	11	12	13	14	15	16	17	18	19	20	...
Points	1200	1160	1120	1100	1060	1040	1020	1000	960	940	920	900	880	860	840	820	800	780	760	740	...

1–5	Qualified directly to Olympic Tournament
6–11	Entered qualifying in the final round
12–17	Entered qualifying in the preliminary round 3
18–24	Entered qualifying in the preliminary round 2
25–27	Entered qualifying in the preliminary round 1

Seeding	Team	WC 2016	WC 2015	WC 2014	OLY 2014	WC 2013	Total
1	United States	1200	900	580	580	300	3560
2	Canada	1160	870	600	600	290	3520
3	Finland	1100	840	530	530	275	3275
4	Russia	1120	825	520	520	280	3265
5	Sweden	1060	795	550	550	255	3210
6	Switzerland	1020	780	560	560	260	3180
7	Japan	1000	765	500	500	240	3005
8	Germany	960	750	510	510	265	2995
9	Czech Republic	1040	720	480	480	250	2970
10	Denmark	900	675	460	470	235	2740
11	Austria	920	705	440	420	225	2710
12	France	940	690	450	410	210	2700
13	Norway	880	660	470	460	220	2690
14	Slovakia	860	630	430	440	230	2590
15	Latvia	820	645	420	370	215	2470
16	China	760	600	410	450	195	2415
17	Hungary	840	585	400	360	180	2365
18	Kazakhstan	800	540	370	430	190	2330
19	Netherlands	740	615	390	380	205	2330
20	Italy	780	570	360	400	175	2285
21	Great Britain	680	525	350	390	185	2130
22	Poland	720	495	340	350	160	2065
Hosts	South Korea	700	510	330	320	150	2010
23	Slovenia	640	450	290	340	155	1875
24	Croatia	620	480	300	310	140	1850
25	North Korea	660	555	380	0	200	1795
26	Spain	580	420	280	330	145	1755
27	Australia	600	390	310	0	170	1470
28	New Zealand	520	465	320	0	165	1470
29	Iceland	560	405	270	0	135	1370
30	Turkey	500	360	250	0	120	1230
31	Mexico	540	435	240	0	0	1215
32	South Africa	440	330	230	0	125	1125
33	Bulgaria	420	315	220	0	115	1070
34	Hong Kong	460	345	210	0	0	1015
35	Belgium	0	375	260	0	130	765
36	Romania	480	0	0	0	0	480

- Ireland is not listed despite having achieved ranking points because they are not currently participating.
- Nations with no shading chose not to participate in Olympic qualifying.

== Preliminary round 1 ==
This round was played from 7 to 9 October 2016 in Mexico City. The winner advanced to the preliminary round 2 as qualifier seven.

=== Group J ===
Pos	Team	Pld	W	OTW	OTL	L	GF	GA	GD	Pts	Qualification
1	Mexico (H)	2	2	0	0	0	24	5	+19	6	Preliminary round 2
2	Turkey	2	1	0	0	1	13	13	0	3	
3	Hong Kong	2	0	0	0	2	2	21	−19	0	

Source: IIHF
Rules for classification: 1) points; 2) head-to-head points; 3) head-to-head goal difference; 4) head-to-head number of goals scored; 5) result against closest best-ranked team outside tied teams; 6) result against second-best ranked team outside tied teams; 7) seeding before tournament.
(H) Host

All times are local (UTC–5).

7 October 2016; 20:30	Hong Kong	2–8 (1–4, 1–3, 0–1)	Turkey	Ice Dome, Mexico City; Attendance: 50

Game reference

Wong Ying Chi Virginia
Goalies
Didem Deniz
Büșra Kanat
Referee:
(United States) Chelsea Rapin
Linesmen:
(Canada) Cianna Lieffers
(United States) Amanda Wilson

	0–1	01:45 – Demir (Uygun) (PP)
	0–2	07:07 – Baktıroğlu (Yılmaz)
Li – 08:08	1–2
	1–3	15:06 – Tayğar (A. Lökbaş)
	1–4	15:41 – Uygun (Baktıroğlu)
	1–5	21:08 – Demirkol (Baktıroğlu)
	1–6	28:30 – Baktıroğlu
Li (Low) – 39:04	2–6
	2–7	39:26 – Toygar (D. Lökbaş)
	2–8	44:45 – Baktıroğlu

10 min
Penalties
12 min
7
Shots
39

8 October 2016; 20:00	Mexico	13–0 (5–0, 5–0, 3–0)	Hong Kong	Ice Dome, Mexico City; Attendance: 1,000

Game reference

María Meza
Monica Renteria
Goalies
Wong Ying Chi Virginia
Chau Nga Sze
Referee:
(United States) Jestina Vichorek
Linesmen:
(Canada) Marie-Pierre Jalbert
(Canada) Cianna Lieffers

Téllez (Escobedo) – 01:27	1–0
J. Rojas – 02:56	2–0
F. Hernández (Treviño, Hurtado) – 10:30	3–0
J. Rojas (González) – 14:39	4–0
Hurtado (Gendrón) (PP) – 16:09	5–0
Gendrón (Téllez) – 21:48	6–0
A. Hernández (Amaya) – 23:44	7–0
Escobedo (Cruz) – 26:26	8–0
Gendrón (PP) – 30:42	9–0
J. Rojas (Chávez, González) – 39:44	10–0
F. Hernández (Toledano) – 52:19	11–0
G. Rojas (A. Hernández) – 53:07	12–0
Téllez (Gendrón, Chávez) – 57:55	13–0

24 min
Penalties
18 min
55
Shots
1

9 October 2016; 19:00	Turkey	5–11 (1–5, 2–2, 2–4)	Mexico	Ice Dome, Mexico City; Attendance: 700

Game reference

Didem Deniz
Goalies
María Meza
Referee:
(United States) Chelsea Rapin
Linesmen:
(Canada) Marie-Pierre Jalbert
(United States) Amanda Wilson

	0–1	06:06 – F. Hernández
	0–2	08:27 – Téllez (Cardenas)
	0–3	14:34 – Gendrón (Téllez, Cardenas)
Tayğar (SH) – 14:50	1–3
	1–4	16:19 – Cruz (González) (PP)
	1–5	16:45 – Hurtado (Cardenas)
Baktıroğlu (Demirkol) – 23:24	2–5
Demirkol (Baktıroğlu) (PP2) – 25:28	3–5
	3–6	33:45 – J. Rojas (González, Chávez)
	3–7	39:36 – J. Rojas (PP)
	3–8	44:33 – Hurtado (Téllez) (PP)
Baktıroğlu (Yılmaz) – 45:44	4–8
	4–9	51:15 – Treviño (Amaya) (SH)
Demir (Baktıroğlu) (PP2) – 51:49	5–9
	5–10	54:39 – Chávez (J. Rojas, González)
	5–11	57:57 – Gendrón (SH)

20 min
Penalties
53 min
21
Shots
39

== Preliminary round 2 ==
This round was played between 3–6 November 2016 in Astana, Kazakhstan and San Sebastián, Spain. The winner of each group advanced to the preliminary round 3 as qualifiers five and six, ranked according their seeding.

=== Group G ===
Pos	Team	Pld	W	OTW	OTL	L	GF	GA	GD	Pts	Qualification
1	Kazakhstan (H)	3	3	0	0	0	10	3	+7	9	Preliminary round 3
2	Poland	3	2	0	0	1	10	7	+3	6	
3	Great Britain	3	1	0	0	2	7	9	−2	3	
4	Mexico	3	0	0	0	3	3	11	−8	0	

Source: IIHF
Rules for classification: 1) points; 2) head-to-head points; 3) head-to-head goal difference; 4) head-to-head number of goals scored; 5) result against closest best-ranked team outside tied teams; 6) result against second-best ranked team outside tied teams; 7) seeding before tournament.
(H) Host

All times are local (UTC+6).

3 November 2016; 15:00	Great Britain	3–2 (0–2, 0–0, 3–0)	Mexico	Barys Arena, Astana; Attendance: 102

Game reference

Samantha Bolwell
Goalies
Mónica Renteria
Referee:
(Finland) Henna Åberg
Linesmen:
(Slovakia) Ivana Besedičová
(Russia) Diana Mokhova

	0–1	01:01 – J. Rojas (Cruz)
	0–2	19:02 – F. Hernández (Larois, Escobedo) (PP)
Lane (Taylor) – 52:38	1–2
Allen (Marsden) – 58:39	2–2
Taylor (Henry) – 59:00	3–2

10 min
Penalties
10 min
39
Shots
11

3 November 2016; 19:00	Poland	1–4 (1–1, 0–3, 0–0)	Kazakhstan	Barys Arena, Astana; Attendance: 465

Game reference

Martyna Sass
Goalies
Darya Dmitriyeva
Referee:
(Russia) Yana Zueva
Linesmen:
(Slovenia) Nataša Pagon
(Finland) Linnea Sainio

Łaskawska (Tomczok, Korkuz) – 12:45	1–0
	1–1	14:56 – Ryspek (Tukhtieva
	1–2	29:21 – Tukhtieva (Ryspek)
	1–3	33:38 – Moldabai (Koroleva)
	1–4	39:03 – Moldabai (Tatyana Likhaus)

6 min
Penalties
8 min
27
Shots
34

4 November 2016; 15:00	Great Britain	3–4 (0–2, 2–1, 1–1)	Poland	Barys Arena, Astana; Attendance: 152

Game reference

Nicole Jackson
Goalies
Martyna Sass
Referee:
(Netherlands) Debby Hengst
Linesmen:
(Finland) Linnea Sainio
(Germany) Svenja Strohmenger

	0–1	11:58 – Czaplik (Późniewska, Czarnecka)
	0–2	12:19 – Późniewska (Czaplik, Chrapek)
Taylor (PP) – 22:41	1–2
Douglas (Herbert, Marsden) – 27:26	2–2
	2–3	29:21 – Strzelecka (Frąckowiak) (PP)
	2–4	44:14 – Wieczorek (Frąckowiak)
Henry (Taylor, Farman) (PP) – 58:21	3–4

6 min
Penalties
10 min
32
Shots
25

4 November 2016; 19:00	Kazakhstan	3–1 (2–0, 1–0, 0–1)	Mexico	Barys Arena, Astana; Attendance: 446

Game reference

Darya Dmitriyeva
Goalies
María Meza
Referee:
(Russia) Yana Zueva
Linesmen:
(Russia) Diana Mokhova
(Slovenia) Nataša Pagon

Kartanbayeva (Aldabergenova) – 04:46	1–0
Felzink – 13:14	2–0
Ashimova (Shegebayeva, Olzhabayeva) – 27:51	3–0
	3–1	45:52 – Chavez

10 min
Penalties
4 min
30
Shots
18

6 November 2016; 12:00	Mexico	0–5 (0–0, 0–4, 0–1)	Poland	Barys Arena, Astana; Attendance: 183

Game reference

Mónica Renteria
María Meza
Goalies
Gabriela Mizera
Referee:
(Netherlands) Debby Hengst
Linesmen:
(Slovakia) Ivana Besedičová
(Slovenia) Nataša Pagon

0–1	20:33 – Późniewska (SH)
0–2	24:04 – Wieczorek (Frąckowiak) (PP)
0–3	34:29 – Późniewska (Chrapek) (PP)
0–4	36:37 – Chrapek (Późniewska, Czaplik) (PP)
0–5	58:31 – Tomczok (Chrapek)

31 min
Penalties
10 min
14
Shots
43

6 November 2016; 16:00	Kazakhstan	3–1 (2–0, 0–0, 1–1)	Great Britain	Barys Arena, Astana; Attendance: 861

Game reference

Darya Dmitriyeva
Goalies
Nicole Jackson
Referee:
(Finland) Henna Åberg
Linesmen:
(Finland) Linnea Sainio
(Germany) Svenja Strohmenger

Nurgalieva (Koroleva) – 03:44	1–0
Moldabai (Likhaus) (PP) – 18:26	2–0
	2–1	54:07 – Henry (Farman, Taylor) (PP)
Likhaus (Ryspek) (ENG) – 59:06	3–1

31 min
Penalties
12 min
28
Shots
23

=== Group H ===
Pos	Team	Pld	W	OTW	OTL	L	GF	GA	GD	Pts	Qualification
1	Italy	3	3	0	0	0	15	2	+13	9	Preliminary round 3
2	Netherlands	3	2	0	0	1	17	6	+11	6	
3	Spain (H)	3	1	0	0	2	5	5	0	3	
4	Slovenia	3	0	0	0	3	3	27	−24	0	

Source: IIHF
Rules for classification: 1) points; 2) head-to-head points; 3) head-to-head goal difference; 4) head-to-head number of goals scored; 5) result against closest best-ranked team outside tied teams; 6) result against second-best ranked team outside tied teams; 7) seeding before tournament.
(H) Host

All times are local (UTC+1).

4 November 2016; 16:30	Slovenia	1–14 (0–4, 0–6, 1–4)	Netherlands	Palacio del Hielo Txuri Urdin, San Sebastian; Attendance: 174

Game reference

Ines Confidenti
Pia Dukarič
Goalies
Lisa Daams
Referee:
(Finland) Maija Kontturi
Linesmen:
(Switzerland) Anina Egli
(Sweden) Julia Johansson

	0–1	05:51 – Wielenga
	0–2	13:16 – Wielenga
	0–3	17:03 – Martens (Haverkorn van Rijsewijk, Van Nes)
	0–4	18:22 – Zwarthoed (De Jong, Hardenbol)
	0–5	26:08 – De Jong (Zwarthoed)
	0–6	28:06 – Wielenga (Van Nes)
	0–7	30:13 – De Jong (Dijkema, Hamers)
	0–8	31:37 – Haverkorn van Rijsewijk (Wielenga)
	0–9	32:32 – Tjin-A-Ton (Van Nes)
	0–10	33:07 – Tjin-A-Ton (Tegelaar, Schollaardt)
	0–11	43:00 – Barton (Van der Zande, Noe)
	0–12	43:23 – Wielenga (Van Nes)
	0–13	46:44 – Wielenga (Van Nes)
	0–14	59:31 – De Jong (Keijzer, Zwarthoed)
E. Dukarič (S. Confidenti, Pren) – 59:45	1–14

2 min
Penalties
4 min
11
Shots
57

4 November 2016; 20:00	Italy	2–0 (0–0, 1–0, 1–0)	Spain	Palacio del Hielo Txuri Urdin, San Sebastian; Attendance: 252

Game reference
Daniela Klotz	Goalies	Alba Gonzalo	Referee: (France) Marie Picavet; Linesmen: (Germany) Alexandra Klaffki (Poland) Joanna Pobożniak
Gius (Zandegiacomo) – 24:33 / 1–0; Dalprà (De la Forest) – 40:18 / 2–0			Referee: (France) Marie Picavet; Linesmen: (Germany) Alexandra Klaffki (Poland) Joanna Pobożniak
14 min	Penalties	12 min	Referee: (France) Marie Picavet; Linesmen: (Germany) Alexandra Klaffki (Poland) Joanna Pobożniak
38	Shots	4	Referee: (France) Marie Picavet; Linesmen: (Germany) Alexandra Klaffki (Poland) Joanna Pobożniak

5 November 2016; 16:30	Italy	8–1 (2–1, 1–0, 5–0)	Slovenia	Palacio del Hielo Txuri Urdin, San Sebastian; Attendance: 120

Game reference

Daniela Klotz
Elisa Biondi
Goalies
Pia Dukarič
Referee:
(Germany) Ramona Weiss
Linesmen:
(Sweden) Julia Johansson
(Czech Republic) Lucie Svobodová

Masperi (Elliscasis) – 02:57	1–0
Zandegiacomo (Gius, Saletta) – 15:46	2–0
	2–1	16:40 – Pren (S. Confidenti)
De Rocco (Zandegiacomo, Saletta) – 24:22	3–1
Furlani (De la Forest, De Rocco) – 40:44	4–1
Dalprà (De Rocco, De la Forest) (PP) – 42:09	5–1
Furlani (Dalprà, De la Forest) – 45:42	6–1
Mattivi (De la Forest) – 52:34	7–1
Carignano (Ricca, Elliscasis) – 54:13	8–1

10 min
Penalties
14 min
46
Shots
7

5 November 2016; 20:00	Netherlands	2–0 (1–0, 1–0, 0–0)	Spain	Palacio del Hielo Txuri Urdin, San Sebastian; Attendance: 357

Game reference
Bianka Bos	Goalies	Alba Gonzalo	Referee: (Finland) Maija Kontturi; Linesmen: (Switzerland) Anina Egli (Poland) Joanna Pobożniak
Zwarthoed (Hardenbol) – 09:21 / 1–0; Hardenbol (De Jong) – 26:20 / 2–0			Referee: (Finland) Maija Kontturi; Linesmen: (Switzerland) Anina Egli (Poland) Joanna Pobożniak
12 min	Penalties	6 min	Referee: (Finland) Maija Kontturi; Linesmen: (Switzerland) Anina Egli (Poland) Joanna Pobożniak
60	Shots	14	Referee: (Finland) Maija Kontturi; Linesmen: (Switzerland) Anina Egli (Poland) Joanna Pobożniak

6 November 2016; 16:30	Netherlands	1–5 (0–3, 1–2, 0–0)	Italy	Palacio del Hielo Txuri Urdin, San Sebastian; Attendance: 276

Game reference

Bianka Bos
Lisa Daams
Goalies
Daniela Klotz
Referee:
(France) Marie Picavet
Linesmen:
(Sweden) Julia Johansson
(Germany) Alexandra Klaffki

	0–1	00:29 – Dalprà (De la Forest)
	0–2	07:03 – Furlani (Dalprà, De la Forest) (PP)
	0–3	10:50 – Carignano (Masperi)
De Jong (Zwarthoed) – 23:46	1–3
	1–4	29:16 – Dalprà (De Rocco) (PP)
	1–5	32:31 – De la Forest (Dalprà) (PP)

53 min
Penalties
10 min
12
Shots
31

6 November 2016; 20:00	Spain	5–1 (4–1, 0–0, 1–0)	Slovenia	Palacio del Hielo Txuri Urdin, San Sebastian; Attendance: 168

Game reference

Alba Gonzalo
Goalies
Ines Confidenti
Referee:
(Germany) Ramona Weiss
Linesmen:
(Switzerland) Anina Egli
(Czech Republic) Lucie Svobodová

Merino (V. Abrisqueta, Muñoz) (PP) – 03:02	1–0
L. Abrisqueta (Merino, Senac Gómez) – 03:27	2–0
Munoz (L. Danielsson, S. Danielsson) – 08:25	3–0
Merino (Álvarez, L. Abrisqueta) – 12:51	4–0
	4–1	15:44 – Pren (Dukarič, S. Confidenti)
Villar (V. Abrisqueta, Moreno) (PP) – 45:17	5–1

10 min
Penalties
8 min
30
Shots
26

== Preliminary round 3 ==
Two round robins were played between 15 and 18 December 2016 in Cergy-Pontoise France, and Stavanger Norway. The winners of each advanced to the final qualification tournaments as qualifiers three and four, ranked according to their seeding.

=== Group E ===
Pos	Team	Pld	W	OTW	OTL	L	GF	GA	GD	Pts	Qualification
1	France (H)	3	3	0	0	0	14	2	+12	9	Final qualification
2	Italy	3	2	0	0	1	7	5	+2	6	
3	Latvia	3	1	0	0	2	7	13	−6	3	
4	China	3	0	0	0	3	2	10	−8	0	

Source: IIHF
Rules for classification: 1) points; 2) head-to-head points; 3) head-to-head goal difference; 4) head-to-head number of goals scored; 5) result against closest best-ranked team outside tied teams; 6) result against second-best ranked team outside tied teams; 7) seeding before tournament.
(H) Host

All times are local (UTC+1).

15 December 2016; 16:00	Latvia	2–3 (2–0, 0–2, 0–1)	Italy	Aren'Ice, Cergy-Pontoise; Attendance: 92

Game reference

Kristiāna Apsīte
Goalies
Daniela Klotz
Referees:
(Norway) Aina Hove
(United States) Melissa Szkola
Linesmen:
(Austria) Bettina Angerer
(France) Charlotte Girard

Miljone (Pētersone) – 02:32	1–0
Miljone (Kubliņa, Pētersone) – 19:19	2–0
	2–1	28:09 – Elliscasis (De Rocco, Orlandini)
	2–2	33:45 – Mistrotofolo (De Rocco, Saletta)
	2–3	46:18 – Ricca (Gius)

4 min
Penalties
10 min
22
Shots
31

15 December 2016; 19:30	China	0–3 (0–0, 0–2, 0–1)	France	Aren'Ice, Cergy-Pontoise; Attendance: 707

Game reference

He Siye
Goalies
Caroline Baldin
Referees:
(Slovakia) Nikoleta Celárová
(Sweden) Katarina Timglas
Linesmen:
(Slovakia) Michaela Kúdelová
(Czech Republic) Zuzana Svobodová

0–1	28:47 – Jouanny (Fohrer) (EA)
0–2	32:07 – Baudrit (Duvin, Fohrer)
0–3	45:06 – Duvin (Fohrer)

8 min
Penalties
4 min
8
Shots
36

16 December 2016; 16:00	Latvia	4–2 (2–0, 1–2, 1–0)	China	Aren'Ice, Cergy-Pontoise; Attendance: 85

Game reference

Kristiāna Apsīte
Goalies
He Siye
Wang Yuqing
Referees:
(Norway) Aina Hove
(Sweden) Katarina Timglas
Linesmen:
(France) Charlotte Girard
(Czech Republic) Zuzana Svobodová

Bičevska (Koka) – 03:22	1–0
Bičevska (Koka) – 07:20	2–0
Ag. Apsīte (Koka, Bičevska) – 20:53	3–0
	3–1	27:52 – Zhang (Baiwei, Kong) (PP2)
	3–2	39:49 – Fang
Pētersone (Mihejenko) – 52:13	4–2

6 min
Penalties
0 min
22
Shots
20

16 December 2016; 19:30	France	3–1 (0–0, 1–0, 2–1)	Italy	Aren'Ice, Cergy-Pontoise; Attendance: 800

Game reference

Caroline Lambert
Goalies
Daniela Klotz
Referees:
(Slovakia) Nikoleta Celárová
(United States) Melissa Szkola
Linesmen:
(Slovakia) Magdaléna Čerhitová
(Slovakia) Michaela Kúdelová

Allemoz (Locatelli, Passard) – 24:44	1–0
	1–1	50:09 – Furlani (Gius)
Allemoz (Passard, Aurard) – 58:18	2–1
Jouanny (Baudrit, Fohrer) (ENG) – 59:13	3–1

8 min
Penalties
16 min
38
Shots
14

18 December 2016; 16:00	Italy	3–0 (0–0, 1–0, 2–0)	China	Aren'Ice, Cergy-Pontoise; Attendance: 153

Game reference

Daniela Klotz
Goalies
Wang Yuqing
Referees:
(Slovakia) Nikoleta Celárová
(Norway) Aina Hove
Linesmen:
(France) Charlotte Girard
(Slovakia) Michaela Kúdelová

Elliscasis (Galtieri) – 28:16	1–0
Furlani (De Rocco, Dalpra) – 40:09	2–0
Mattivi (Saletta) (ENG) – 58:58	3–0

0 min
Penalties
6 min
33
Shots
17

18 December 2016; 19:30	France	8–1 (4–0, 3–0, 1–1)	Latvia	Aren'Ice, Cergy-Pontoise; Attendance: 928

Game reference

Caroline Baldin
Goalies
Kristiāna Apsīte
Referees:
(United States) Melissa Szkola
(Sweden) Katarina Timglas
Linesmen:
(Austria) Bettina Angerer
(Slovakia) Magdaléna Čerhitová

Fohrer (Baudrit) – 01:46	1–0
Passard (Parment) – 05:48	2–0
Aurard (Passard) – 08:06	3–0
Passard (Allemoz) – 11:12	4–0
Escudero (Bouché) – 23:25	5–0
Jouanny (Vix) – 23:52	6–0
Fohrer (Gendarme) (PP) – 34:55	7–0
	7–1	42:57 – Ag. Apsīte (Miljone)
Allemoz (Locatelli) (PP) – 52:47	8–1

12 min
Penalties
6 min
49
Shots
22

=== Group F ===
Pos	Team	Pld	W	OTW	OTL	L	GF	GA	GD	Pts	Qualification
1	Norway (H)	3	3	0	0	0	15	2	+13	9	Final qualification
2	Hungary	3	2	0	0	1	7	6	+1	6	
3	Slovakia	3	1	0	0	2	5	8	−3	3	
4	Kazakhstan	3	0	0	0	3	2	13	−11	0	

Source: IIHF
Rules for classification: 1) points; 2) head-to-head points; 3) head-to-head goal difference; 4) head-to-head number of goals scored; 5) result against closest best-ranked team outside tied teams; 6) result against second-best ranked team outside tied teams; 7) seeding before tournament.
(H) Host

All times are local (UTC+1).

16 December 2016; 15:00	Slovakia	3–0 (1–0, 0–0, 2–0)	Kazakhstan	DNB Arena, Stavanger; Attendance: 48

Game reference

Romana Kiapešová
Goalies
Daria Dmitrieva
Referees:
(Sweden) Gabriella Gran
(Finland) Kaisa Ketonen
Linesmen:
(Sweden) Liv Andersson
(Norway) Bente Owren

Mikesková (Kapustová) – 18:51	1–0
Ištocyová (PP) – 45:25	2–0
Ihnaťová (Mikesková, Kapustová) – 57:30	3–0

10 min
Penalties
12 min
31
Shots
17

16 December 2016; 18:30	Hungary	0–4 (0–1, 0–3, 0–0)	Norway	DNB Arena, Stavanger; Attendance: 331

Game reference

Anikó Németh
Goalies
Ena Nystrøm
Referees:
(Italy) Deana Cuglietta
(United States) Katie Guay
Linesmen:
(United States) Jacqueline Spresser
(Finland) Johanna Taurianen

0–1	16:17 – Morset (Haug-Hansen) (PP)
0–2	33:11 – Martinsen
0–3	36:59 – Haug-Hansen (Olafsen) (PP)
0–4	37:43 – Bergesen (Pedersen)

6 min
Penalties
8 min
23
Shots
30

17 December 2016; 15:00	Slovakia	0–2 (0–0, 0–0, 0–2)	Hungary	DNB Arena, Stavanger; Attendance: 70

Game reference
Romana Kiapešová	Goalies	Anikó Németh	Referees: (Sweden) Gabriella Gran (United States) Katie Guay; Linesmen: (Norway) Bente Owren (Finland) Johanna Taurianen
0–1 / 49:07 – Gowie (T. Horváth, Dabasi); 0–2 / 59:07 – Kiss (Grković) (SH, ENG)			Referees: (Sweden) Gabriella Gran (United States) Katie Guay; Linesmen: (Norway) Bente Owren (Finland) Johanna Taurianen
6 min	Penalties	10 min	Referees: (Sweden) Gabriella Gran (United States) Katie Guay; Linesmen: (Norway) Bente Owren (Finland) Johanna Taurianen
29	Shots	26	Referees: (Sweden) Gabriella Gran (United States) Katie Guay; Linesmen: (Norway) Bente Owren (Finland) Johanna Taurianen

17 December 2016; 18:30	Norway	5–0 (1–0, 1–0, 3–0)	Kazakhstan	DNB Arena, Stavanger; Attendance: 216

Game reference

Ena Nystrøm
Goalies
Daria Dmitrieva
Aizhan Raushanova
Referees:
(Italy) Deana Cuglietta
(Finland) Kaisa Ketonen
Linesmen:
(Sweden) Jessica Lundgren
(United States) Jacqueline Spresser

Fischer (Holøs) – 13:01	1–0
Morset (Dalen, Sirum) – 25:12	2–0
Sirum (Engmann) – 48:00	3–0
Bialik (Fischer) – 48:28	4–0
Engmann (Fischer, Olafsen) – 57:59	5–0

6 min
Penalties
8 min
53
Shots
11

18 December 2016; 14:30	Kazakhstan	2–5 (0–0, 1–3, 1–2)	Hungary	DNB Arena, Stavanger; Attendance: 34

Game reference

Daria Dmitrieva
Aizhan Raushanova
Goalies
Anikó Németh
Referees:
(Italy) Deana Cuglietta
(Sweden) Gabriella Gran
Linesmen:
(Sweden) Liv Andersson
(United States) Jacqueline Spresser

	0–1	23:03 – H. Pintér (L. Pintér, Medgyes) (PP)
	0–2	27:47 – Somogyi (Medgyes, Kiss)
	0–3	29:07 – H. Pintér
Koroleva (Aldabergenova, Konysheva) – 37:35	1–3
	1–4	45:01 – Medgyes (Dabasi, Gowie) (PP)
	1–5	50:13 – T. Horváth (Dabasi) (PP)
Ryspek (Fux) – 56:10	2–5

16 min
Penalties
2 min
26
Shots
37

18 December 2016; 18:00	Norway	6–2 (1–0, 2–2, 3–0)	Slovakia	DNB Arena, Stavanger; Attendance: 244

Game reference

Ena Nystrøm
Goalies
Romana Kiapešová
Referees:
(United States) Katie Guay
(Finland) Kaisa Ketonen
Linesmen:
(Sweden) Jessica Lundgren
(Finland) Johanna Taurianen

Martinsen (Haug-Hansen, Tendenes) – 13:36	1–0
	1–1	20:45 – Ištocyová (Klimešová) (PP)
Sirum (Morset, Olafsen) (PP2) – 25:41	2–1
Fischer (Dalen, Bialik) – 28:15	3–1
	3–2	30:14 – Ihnaťová (Klimešová, Gápová)
Tendenes (Hjelm, Sirum) – 41:04	4–2
Fischer (Bialik) – 48:15	5–2
Holos (Martinsen, Dalen) (PP2) – 55:02	6–2

33 min
Penalties
16 min
38
Shots
21

== Final qualification ==
Two round robins were played from 9 to 12 February 2017 in Arosa, Switzerland and Tomakomai, Japan. The two group winners qualified for the Olympic tournament Group B.

=== Group C ===
Pos	Team	Pld	W	OTW	OTL	L	GF	GA	GD	Pts	Qualification
1	Switzerland (H)	3	3	0	0	0	14	3	+11	9	2018 Winter Olympics
2	Czech Republic	3	2	0	0	1	10	7	+3	6	
3	Norway	3	1	0	0	2	6	10	−4	3	
4	Denmark	3	0	0	0	3	5	15	−10	0	

Source: IIHF
Rules for classification: 1) points; 2) head-to-head points; 3) head-to-head goal difference; 4) head-to-head number of goals scored; 5) result against closest best-ranked team outside tied teams; 6) result against second-best ranked team outside tied teams; 7) seeding before tournament.
(H) Host

All times are local (UTC+1).

9 February 2017; 16:00	Denmark	1–6 (0–2, 0–3, 1–1)	Switzerland	Sport- und Kongresszentrum, Arosa; Attendance: 450

Game reference

Lisa Jensen
Goalies
Florence Schelling
Referees:
(United States) Dina Allen
(Germany) Nicole Hertrich
Linesmen:
(Sweden) Veronica Johansson
(Canada) Justine Todd

	0–1	09:18 – Müller (Waidacher, Stalder)
	0–2	14:06 – Meier (Stalder, Müller) (PP)
	0–3	33:18 – Stalder (Müller, Zollinger)
	0–4	35:44 – Zollinger (Bullo)
	0–5	39:00 – Stalder (Meier, Müller) (SH)
Langsager – 49:48	1–5
	1–6	51:43 – Stalder (PS)

10 min
Penalties
12 min
14
Shots
41

9 February 2017; 20:00	Czech Republic	5–0 (2–0, 3–0, 0–0)	Norway	Sport- und Kongresszentrum, Arosa; Attendance: 150

Game reference

Klára Peslarová
Goalies
Ena Nystrøm
Referees:
(Canada) Gabrielle Ariano-Lortie
(Japan) Miyuki Nakayama
Linesmen:
(Switzerland) Magali Anex
(Germany) Lisa Linnek

Křížová (Mrázová, Lédlová) – 04:15	1–0
Pejzlová (Přibylová, Vanišová) – 17:25	2–0
Lédlová (Polenská, Škrdlová) – 32:09	3–0
Křížová (Tejralová, Zíková) (PP) – 35:35	4–0
Manhartová (Povová, Studentová) (PP) – 38:30	5–0

6 min
Penalties
10 min
38
Shots
18

11 February 2017; 16:00	Switzerland	4–1 (1–1, 1–0, 2–0)	Norway	Sport- und Kongresszentrum, Arosa; Attendance: 1,123

Game reference

Florence Schelling
Goalies
Ena Nystrøm
Referees:
(United States) Dina Allen
(Japan) Miyuki Nakayama
Linesmen:
(Germany) Lisa Linnek
(Slovenia) Nataša Pagon

Stalder (Raselli) (PP) – 02:27	1–0
	1–1	06:50 – Holos (Dalen, Bialik)
Stalder (Thalmann) – 33:15	2–1
Raselli (Meier, Müller) (PP) – 54:49	3–1
Stalder (Bullo) (ENG) – 59:48	4–1

6 min
Penalties
18 min
45
Shots
17

11 February 2017; 20:00	Czech Republic	4–3 (1–1, 3–1, 0–1)	Denmark	Sport- und Kongresszentrum, Arosa; Attendance: 106

Game reference

Klára Peslarová
Goalies
Lisa Jensen
Referees:
(Canada) Gabrielle Ariano-Lortie
(Germany) Nicole Hertrich
Linesmen:
(Switzerland) Magali Anex
(Canada) Justine Todd

	0–1	07:13 – Jakobsen (Jensen) (PP2)
Přibylová (Horálková, Pejzlová) – 12:53	1–1
Povová – 22:36	2–1
Kolowratová (Mrázová, Křížová) (PP) – 31:18	3–1
	3–2	32:22 – Persson (Ernst)
Přibylová (Pejzlová, Vanišová) – 33:59	4–2
	4–3	48:35 – Andersen (Asperup)

10 min
Penalties
14 min
38
Shots
16

12 February 2017; 16:00	Switzerland	4–1 (0–1, 2–0, 2–0)	Czech Republic	Sport- und Kongresszentrum, Arosa; Attendance: 1,342

Game reference

Florence Schelling
Goalies
Klára Peslarová
Referees:
(United States) Dina Allen
(Canada) Gabrielle Ariano-Lortie
Linesmen:
(Sweden) Veronica Johansson
(Germany) Lisa Linnek

	0–1	17:57 – Lédlová (Křížová, Mrázová)
Müller (Stalder, Raselli) – 34:19	1–1
Stalder (Müller, Waidacher) (PP) – 39:42	2–1
Müller (Meier, Stalder) (PP) – 49:06	3–1
Stalder (Müller) (ENG) – 59:26	4–1

16 min
Penalties
12 min
21
Shots
20

12 February 2017; 20:00	Norway	5–1 (0–1, 4–0, 1–0)	Denmark	Sport- und Kongresszentrum, Arosa; Attendance: 104

Game reference

Linnea Holterud
Goalies
Lisa Jensen
Martine Terrida
Referees:
(Germany) Nicole Hertrich
(Japan) Miyuki Nakayama
Linesmen:
(Slovenia) Nataša Pagon
(Canada) Justine Todd

	0–1	04:31 – Brix (Weis)
Dalen (Martinsen, Morset) (PP2) – 27:23	1–1
Olafsen (Fischer, Hansen) (PP) – 27:54	2–1
Hansen – 30:50	3–1
Sirum (Dalen) – 36:55	4–1
Dalen (Engmann) – 44:40	5–1

6 min
Penalties
10 min
34
Shots
15

=== Group D ===
Pos	Team	Pld	W	OTW	OTL	L	GF	GA	GD	Pts	Qualification
1	Japan (H)	3	3	0	0	0	13	3	+10	9	2018 Winter Olympics
2	Germany	3	1	1	0	1	8	6	+2	5	
3	France	3	1	0	1	1	6	8	−2	4	
4	Austria	3	0	0	0	3	3	13	−10	0	

Source: IIHF
Rules for classification: 1) points; 2) head-to-head points; 3) head-to-head goal difference; 4) head-to-head number of goals scored; 5) result against closest best-ranked team outside tied teams; 6) result against second-best ranked team outside tied teams; 7) seeding before tournament.
(H) Host

All times are local (UTC+9).

9 February 2017; 14:30	Germany	3–2 GWS (0–1, 1–0, 1–1) (OT 0–0) (SO: 1–0)	France	Hakucho Oji Ice Arena, Tomakomai; Attendance: 450

Game reference

Jennifer Harß
Goalies
Caroline Baldin
Referees:
(Canada) Melanie Bordeleau
(Switzerland) Drahomira Fialova
Linesmen:
(Finland) Jenni Heikkinen
(Czech Republic) Ilona Novotná

	0–1	16:07 — Allemoz (Fohrer)
Kratzer (Spielberger, Zorn) (PP) — 34:58	1–1
	1–2	44:54 — Baudrit (Duvin)
Delarbre (Rothemund) — 58:56	2–2

Zorn (miss)
Anwander
Lanzl
Shootout
(miss) Bouche
(miss) Fohrer
10 min
Penalties
14 min
45
Shots
20

9 February 2017; 18:00	Austria	1–6 (1–1, 0–2, 0–3)	Japan	Hakucho Oji Ice Arena, Tomakomai; Attendance: 1,835

Game reference

Theresa Hornich
Goalies
Nana Fujimoto
Referees:
(Switzerland) Anna Eskola
(United States) Jamie Huntley-Park
Linesmen:
(Canada) Stephanie Gagnon
(United States) Michaela Frattarelli

	0–1	17:27 — Kubo (Ukita, A. Toko) (PP)
Kantor (Altmann) — 19:29	1–1
	1–2	22:53 — Koike (Nakamura)
	1–3	26:53 — Kubo (H. Toko, Suzuki)
	1–4	43:41 — Ono (Osawa)
	1–5	56:50 — Kubo (Nakamura, H. Toko) (PP)
	1–6	58:10 — Nakamura (Hosoyamada, Adachi)

6 min
Penalties
2 min
23
Shots
42

11 February 2017; 14:30	Germany	4–1 (2–1, 0–0, 2–0)	Austria	Hakucho Oji Ice Arena, Tomakomai; Attendance: 851

Game reference

Jennifer Harß
Goalies
Theresa Hornich
Referees:
(Switzerland) Drahomira Fialova
(United States) Jamie Huntley-Park
Linesmen:
(United States) Jessica Leclerc
(Czech Republic) Ilona Novotná

Lanzl (Kluge, Anwander) — 06:00	1–0
	1–1	06:52 — Kantor (Meixner)
Eisenschmid (Anwander) (PP) — 13:46	2–1
Gleissner (Kluge, Lanzl) (PP) — 53:00	3–1
Spielberger (Kratzer, Zorn) — 53:22	4–1

6 min
Penalties
18 min
45
Shots
15

11 February 2017; 18:00	Japan	4–1 (1–0, 1–1, 2–0)	France	Hakucho Oji Ice Arena, Tomakomai; Attendance: 2,597

Game reference

Nana Fujioto
Goalies
Caroline Baldin
Referees:
(Canada) Melanie Bordeleau
(Switzerland) Anna Eskola
Linesmen:
(United States) Michaela Frattarelli
(Finland) Jenni Heikkinen

Nakamura (Kubo, Takeuchi) — 02:21	1–0
H. Toko — 23:26	2–0
	2–1	31:35— Allemoz (PP)
Kubo (A. Toko) (PP) — 53:03	3–1
Ukita (H. Toko) — 57:37	4–1

14 min
Penalties
10 min
46
Shots
22

12 February 2017; 14:30	France	3–1 (0–0, 1–1, 2–0)	Austria	Hakucho Oji Ice Arena, Tomakomai; Attendance: 1,167

Game reference

Caroline Baldin
Goalies
Nicole Arnberger
Referees:
(Switzerland) Anna Eskola
(Switzerland) Drahomira Fialova
Linesmen:
(United States) Michaela Frattarelli
(Canada) Stephanie Gagnon

Allemoz (Parment) — 36:27	1–0
	1–1	39:45 — Beiter (PP)
Gendarme (Duvin) (PP) — 51:40	2–1
Duvin (ENG) — 59:59	3–1

6 min
Penalties
14 min
28
Shots
34

12 February 2017; 18:00	Japan	3–1 (0–0, 2–1, 1–0)	Germany	Hakucho Oji Ice Arena, Tomakomai; Attendance: 3,111

Game reference

Nana Fujimoto
Goalies
Jennifer Harß
Referees:
(Canada) Melanie Bordeleau
(United States) Jamie Huntley-Park
Linesmen:
(Finland) Jenni Heikkinen
(United States) Jessica Leclerc

M. Fujimoto (Hori, Adachi) — 27:44	1–0
Ono (Hosoyamada, Koike) (PP) — 30:50	2–0
	2–1	36:30 — Eisenschmid (Lanzl, Anwander) (PP)
Kubo (H. Toko) — 54:43	3–1

8 min
Penalties
6 min
25
Shots
15
