= 2016 IIHF Women's World Championship Division I =

International ice hockey competition

Tournament details
- Host countries: Denmark; Italy
- Venues: 2 (in 2 host cities)
- Dates: 25–31 March 2016; 4–10 April 2016
- Teams: 12

The 2016 IIHF Women's World Championship Division I consisted of two international ice hockey tournaments organized by the International Ice Hockey Federation. Division I A and Division I B represent the second and third tier of the IIHF Women's World Championship.

== Venues ==
Division I Group A	Division I Group B
Aalborg	Asiago
Gigantium; Capacity: 5,000	Pala Hodegart; Capacity: 3,000

== Division I Group A ==
2016 IIHF Women's World Championship Division I A
Tournament details
- Host country: Denmark
- City: Aalborg
- Venue: 1 (in 1 host city)
- Dates: 25–31 March 2016
- Teams: 6

Tournament statistics
- Games played: 15
- Goals scored: 77 (5.13 per game)
- Attendance: 3,020 (201 per game)
- Scoring leader: (Germany) Laura Kluge (9 points)

Official website
- www.iihf.com

The Division I Group A tournament was played in Aalborg, Denmark, from 25 to 31 March 2016.

=== Participating teams ===
Team	Qualification
Germany	Placed 8th in Top Division last year and were relegated.
Austria	Placed 2nd in Division I A last year.
France	Placed 3rd in Division I A last year.
Denmark	Hosts; placed 4th in Division I A last year.
Norway	Placed 5th in Division I A last year.
Slovakia	Placed 1st in Division I B last year and were promoted.

=== Match officials ===
4 referees and 7 linesmen were selected for the tournament.

Referees

- (Finland) Henna Aberg
- (United Kingdom) Deana Cuglietta
- (United States) Katie Guay
- (Russia) Yana Zueva

Linesmen

- (Sweden) Liv Andersson
- (Switzerland) Magali Anex
- (Belgium) Marine Dinant
- (United States) Jamie Fenstermacher
- (United Kingdom) Amy Lack
- (Denmark) Trine Phillipsen
- (Czech Republic) Michaela Štefková

=== Final standings ===
Pos	Team	Pld	W	OTW	OTL	L	GF	GA	GD	Pts	Promotion or relegation
1	Germany	5	4	0	0	1	16	7	+9	12 (Note: France 0–5 Germany)	Promoted to the 2017 Top Division
2	France	5	4	0	0	1	15	9	+6	12	
3	Austria	5	3	1	0	1	16	10	+6	11	
4	Denmark (H)	5	2	0	0	3	13	14	−1	6	
5	Norway	5	0	1	1	3	10	17	−7	3	
6	Slovakia	5	0	0	1	4	7	20	−13	1	Relegated to the 2017 Division I B

Source: IIHF
Rules for classification: 1) points; 2) head-to-head points; 3) head-to-head goal difference; 4) head-to-head number of goals scored; 5) result against closest best-ranked team outside tied teams; 6) result against second-best ranked team outside tied teams; 7) seeding before tournament.
(H) Host

=== Match results ===
All times are local (until 26 March: Central European Time – UTC+1; from 28 March on: Central European Summer Time – UTC+2).

25 March 2016; 13:00	Norway	1–4 (0–1, 0–3, 1–0)	France	Gigantium, Aalborg; Attendance: 160

Game reference

Karoline Aarvik
Goalies
Caroline Baldin
Referee:
(United Kingdom) Deana Cuglietta
Linesmen:
(Belgium) Marine Dinant
(Denmark) Trine Phillipsen

	0–1	17:34 – Allemoz (Bouché) (PP)
	0–2	28:21 – Allemoz (Aurard, Passard)
	0–3	34:02 – Duvin (Baudrit, Fohrer)
	0–4	37:46 – Passard (Allemoz, Aurard)
Dalen (Fischer) – 41:40	1–4

12 min
Penalties
8 min
24
Shots
23

25 March 2016; 16:30	Slovakia	2–4 (1–1, 1–2, 0–1)	Germany	Gigantium, Aalborg; Attendance: 154

Game reference

Romana Kiapešová
Goalies
Jennifer Harß
Referee:
(Finland) Henna Aberg
Linesmen:
(United Kingdom) Amy Lack
(Czech Republic) Michaela Štefková

Gápová (Klimášová) – 07:41	1–0
	1–1	12:42 – Kamenik
	1–2	27:29 – Kluge (Lanzl)
	1–3	30:08 – Kluge (Lanzl, Anwander) (PP)
Klimášová (Kapustová) – 32:54	2–3
	2–4	43:24 – Anwander (Kluge)

10 min
Penalties
6 min
18
Shots
40

25 March 2016; 20:00	Denmark	3–4 (1–2, 1–0, 1–2)	Austria	Gigantium, Aalborg; Attendance: 316

Game reference

Kamilla Lund Nielsen
Goalies
Theresa Hornich
Referee:
(United States) Katie Guay
Linesmen:
(Switzerland) Magali Anex
(United States) Jamie Fenstermacher

Persson (Jakobsen) (PP) – 08:11	1–0
	1–1	12:20 – Weber (Schwärzler, Kantor)
	1–2	19:20 – Schwärzler (Kantor, Weber) (PP)
Jakobsen (Glud, N. Jensen) (PP) – 31:48	2–2
Gregersen (Frandsen, Asperup) (PP) – 50:58	3–2
	3–3	53:23 – Weber (Schwärzler)
	3–4	59:14 – Meixner (Hummel) (SH)

20 min
Penalties
8 min
14
Shots
31

26 March 2016; 13:00	France	5–0 (1–0, 2–0, 2–0)	Slovakia	Gigantium, Aalborg; Attendance: 97

Game reference

Caroline Lambert
Goalies
Jana Budajová
Referee:
(Russia) Yana Zueva
Linesmen:
(Switzerland) Magali Anex
(United States) Jamie Fenstermacher

Aurard (Allemoz) – 00:16	1–0
Duvin (Fohrer, Andrieu) – 21:18	2–0
Baudrit (Bouché, Fohrer) – 27:48	3–0
Gendarme (Fohrer) (PP) – 50:41	4–0
Escudero (Vix, Jouanny) – 55:34	5–0

12 min
Penalties
10 min
28
Shots
24

26 March 2016; 16:30	Germany	3–2 (3–2, 0–0, 0–0)	Denmark	Gigantium, Aalborg; Attendance: 325

Game reference

Ivonne Schröder
Goalies
Kamilla Lund Nielsen
Lisa Jensen
Referee:
(United States) Katie Guay
Linesmen:
(Sweden) Liv Andersson
(Belgium) Marine Dinant

Zorn (Bittner) – 00:21	1–0
Kluge (Anwander) (PP) – 05:50	2–0
	2–1	08:17 – Langsager (Østergaard, Asperup) (PP)
Rothemund (Zorn) – 13:37	3–1
	3–2	16:47 – Densing (Frandsen, Brix)

6 min
Penalties
6 min
32
Shots
18

26 March 2016; 20:00	Austria	4–3 GWS (0–3, 1–0, 2–0) (OT 0–0) (SO: 1–0)	Norway	Gigantium, Aalborg; Attendance: 173

Game reference

Nicole Arnberger
Theresa Hornich
Goalies
Ingrid Sandven
Referee:
(Finland) Henna Aberg
Linesmen:
(Denmark) Trine Phillipsen
(Czech Republic) Michaela Štefková

	0–1	05:23 – Bialik
	0–2	06:53 – Henriksen (Bialik)
	0–3	08:47 – Bialik (Øiseth, Engmann)
Weber (Altmann, Wittich) – 24:17	1–3
Altmann (Meixner, Fazokas) – 52:20	2–3
Weber (Fazokas) (PP) – 56:40	3–3

Meixner (miss)
Altmann (miss)
Kantor (miss)
Altmann
Shootout
(miss) Fischer
(miss) Henriksen
(miss) Bialik
(miss) Haug-Hansen
6 min
Penalties
12 min
34
Shots
37

28 March 2016; 13:00	Slovakia	1–3 (1–1, 0–2, 0–0)	Denmark	Gigantium, Aalborg; Attendance: 325

Game reference

Romana Kiapešová
Goalies
Lisa Jensen
Referee:
(Russia) Yana Zueva
Linesmen:
(Belgium) Marine Dinant
(Czech Republic) Michaela Štefková

Lúčová (Ištocyová, Ihnátová) – 10:57	1–0
	1–1	18:27 – Weis (PP)
	1–2	21:50 – Glud (Brix)
	1–3	34:24 – Glud (Jakobsen, Brix) (PP)

10 min
Penalties
6 min
17
Shots
29

28 March 2016; 16:30	Austria	1–2 (0–1, 0–0, 1–1)	France	Gigantium, Aalborg; Attendance: 130

Game reference

Theresa Hornich
Goalies
Caroline Baldin
Referee:
(United Kingdom) Deana Cuglietta
Linesmen:
(Sweden) Liv Andersson
(Denmark) Trine Phillipsen

	0–1	05:13 – Allemoz (Gedarme)
	0–2	42:58 – Allemoz (Passard)
Schwärzler (Altmann) – 52:09	1–2

12 min
Penalties
14 min
25
Shots
21

28 March 2016; 20:00	Germany	3–0 (1–0, 2–0, 0–0)	Norway	Gigantium, Aalborg; Attendance: 157

Game reference

Jennifer Harß
Goalies
Ingrid Sandven
Referee:
(United States) Katie Guay
Linesmen:
(United States) Jamie Fenstermacher
(United Kingdom) Amy Lack

Strobel (Kluge, Anwander) – 15:15	1–0
Kluge (Anwander) (PP) – 30:00	2–0
Anwander (Schuster, Kluge) – 33:41	3–0

6 min
Penalties
6 min
18
Shots
19

29 March 2016; 13:00	Austria	4–1 (1–0, 0–1, 3–0)	Slovakia	Gigantium, Aalborg; Attendance: 93

Game reference

Theresa Hornich
Goalies
Romana Kiapešová
Referee:
(Russia) Yana Zueva
Linesmen:
(United Kingdom) Amy Lack
(Denmark) Trine Phillipsen

Lopez – 14:59	1–0
	1–1	25:14 – Gorecká (Klimášová, Ihnátová)
Kantor (Hybler, Hummel) (PP) – 40:55	2–1
Meixner (Altmann) – 56:18	3–1
Kantor (ENG) – 59:54	4–1

8 min
Penalties
8 min
24
Shots
13

29 March 2016; 16:30	France	0–5 (0–1, 0–0, 0–4)	Germany	Gigantium, Aalborg; Attendance: 155

Game reference

Caroline Lambert
Goalies
Jennifer Harß
Referee:
(United Kingdom) Deana Cuglietta
Linesmen:
(Belgium) Marine Dinant
(United States) Jamie Fenstermacher

0–1	02:48 – Spielberger (Zorn, Bittner)
0–2	45:20 – Lanzl (Anwander, Eisenschmid) (PP)
0–3	46:46 – Kluge (Lanzl, Fiegert) (PP)
0–4	53:36 – Kluge (Lanzl, Anwander) (PP)
0–5	59:59 – Zorn (Spielberger, Fiegert)

12 min
Penalties
6 min
16
Shots
34

29 March 2016; 20:00	Denmark	3–2 (2–1, 1–0, 0–1)	Norway	Gigantium, Aalborg; Attendance: 215

Game reference

Lisa Jensen
Goalies
Ingrid Sandven
Karoline Aarvik
Referee:
(Finland) Henna Aberg
Linesmen:
(United Kingdom) Amy Lack
(Denmark) Trine Phillipsen

Jakobsen (Asperup) – 03:17	1–0
Gregersen (Brix) – 05:12	2–0
	2–1	16:36 – Dalen (Holøs, Pedersen)
Jakobsen (Weis, Andersen) – 26:28	3–1
	3–2	49:09 – Dalen (Henriksen, Holøs)

4 min
Penalties
10 min
26
Shots
23

31 March 2016; 13:00	Germany	1–3 (0–2, 0–0, 1–1)	Austria	Gigantium, Aalborg; Attendance: 102

Game reference

Ivonne Schröder
Goalies
Theresa Hornich
Referee:
(Finland) Henna Aberg
Linesmen:
(Sweden) Liv Andersson
(Switzerland) Magali Anex

	0–1	05:53 – Schwärzler (Meixner)
	0–2	13:06 – Meixner (Kantor, Fazokas)
Anwander (Spielberger) – 45:39	1–2
	1–3	59:16 – Schafzahl (Wittich) (ENG)

6 min
Penalties
4 min
20
Shots
26

31 March 2016; 16:30	Norway	4–3 OT (0–1, 2–1, 1–1) (OT 1–0)	Slovakia	Gigantium, Aalborg; Attendance: 253

Game reference

Ingrid Sandven
Goalies
Romana Kiapešová
Referee:
(United States) Katie Guay
Linesmen:
(United States) Jamie Fenstermacher
(Denmark) Trine Phillipsen

	0–1	10:55 – Lúčová (Ihnátová)
Fischer – 28:34	1–1
Henriksen – 32:07	2–1
	2–2	36:20 – Lúčová (Ihnátová, Kapustová)
Dalen (Henriksen, Morset) – 41:33	3–2
	3–3	46:59 – Kapustová
Aakre – 61:44	4–3

6 min
Penalties
6 min
38
Shots
20

31 March 2016; 20:00	France	4–2 (2–1, 0–1, 2–0)	Denmark	Gigantium, Aalborg; Attendance: 365

Game reference

Caroline Baldin
Goalies
Lisa Jensen
Referee:
(Russia) Yana Zueva
Linesmen:
(United Kingdom) Amy Lack
(Czech Republic) Michaela Štefková

	0–1	06:48 – Brix (Glud, Ostergaard)
Passard (Allemoz, Aurard) (PP) – 10:31	1–1
Passard (Allemoz, Parment) (PP) – 13:52	2–1
	2–2	33:05 – Persson (Glud, Jakobsen) (PP)
Allemoz (Passard, Aurard) (PP) – 50:03	3–2
Parment (ENG) – 58:59	4–2

8 min
Penalties
8 min
18
Shots
21

=== Awards and statistics ===
==== Awards ====
- Best players selected by the directorate:
  - Best Goalkeeper: (France) Caroline Baldin
  - Best Defenseman: (Denmark) Josefine Hansen
  - Best Forward: (Germany) Laura Kluge

Source: IIHF.com

==== Scoring leaders ====
List shows the top skaters sorted by points, then goals.

	Player	GP	G	A	Pts	+/−	PIM	POS
(Germany)	Laura Kluge	5	6	3	9	+4	2	F
(France)	Marion Allemoz	5	5	4	9	+4	0	F
(Germany)	Manuela Anwander	5	3	6	9	+3	0	F
(Denmark)	Josefine Jakobsen	5	3	3	6	–2	16	F
(France)	Emmanuelle Passard	5	3	3	6	+3	2	F
(Austria)	Janine Weber	5	4	1	5	+3	4	F
(Austria)	Eva-Maria Beiter Schwärzler	5	3	2	5	+4	4	F
(Austria)	Anna Meixner	5	3	2	5	+6	4	F
(Austria)	Denise Altmann	5	2	3	5	+9	2	F
(Denmark)	Silke Glud	5	2	3	5	–2	0	F
(Norway)	Martine Henriksen	5	2	3	5	+4	2	F
(Austria)	Esther Kantor	5	2	3	5	+7	4	D

GP = Games played; G = Goals; A = Assists; Pts = Points; +/− = Plus/minus; PIM = Penalties in minutes; POS = Position
Source: IIHF.com

==== Leading goaltenders ====
Only the top five goaltenders, based on save percentage, who have played at least 40% of their team's minutes, are included in this list.

	Player	TOI	GA	GAA	SA	Sv%	SO
(Germany)	Jennifer Harß	180:00	2	0.67	53	96.23	2
(France)	Caroline Baldin	180:00	4	1.33	70	94.29	0
(Denmark)	Lisa Jensen	218:33	6	1.65	81	92.59	0
(Austria)	Theresa Hornich	284:18	7	1.48	93	92.47	0
(France)	Caroline Lambert	120:00	5	2.50	58	91.38	1

TOI = Time on ice (minutes:seconds); SA = Shots against; GA = Goals against; GAA = Goals against average; Sv% = Save percentage; SO = Shutouts
Source: IIHF.com

== Division I Group B ==
2016 IIHF Women's World Championship Division I B
Tournament details
- Host country: Italy
- City: Asiago
- Venue: 1 (in 1 host city)
- Dates: 4–10 April 2016
- Teams: 6

Tournament statistics
- Games played: 15
- Goals scored: 76 (5.07 per game)
- Attendance: 3,855 (257 per game)
- Scoring leader: (Kazakhstan) Alyone Fux (8 points)

Official website
- www.iihf.com

The Division I Group B tournament was played in Asiago, Italy, from 4 to 10 April 2016.

=== Participating teams ===
Team	Qualification
Latvia	Placed 6th in Division I A last year and were relegated.
Netherlands	Placed 2nd in Division I B last year.
China	Placed 3rd in Division I B last year.
Hungary	Placed 4th in Division I B last year.
Italy	Hosts; placed 5th in Division I B last year.
Kazakhstan	Placed 1st in Division II A last year and were promoted.

=== Match officials ===
4 referees and 7 linesmen were selected for the tournament.

Referees

- (Slovakia) Nikoleta Celárová
- (Finland) Maija Kontturi
- (Canada) Lacey Senuk
- (Germany) Ramona Weiss

Linesmen

- (Switzerland) Anina Egli
- (Italy) Mirjam Gruber
- (Slovakia) Michaela Kúdeľová
- (Switzerland) Anne-Ruth Kuonen
- (Poland) Joanna Pobożniak
- (United States) Jodi Price
- (Germany) Svenja Strohmenger

=== Final standings ===
Pos	Team	Pld	W	OTW	OTL	L	GF	GA	GD	Pts	Promotion or relegation
1	Hungary	5	4	0	0	1	15	10	+5	12	Promoted to the 2017 Division I A
2	Latvia	5	3	0	0	2	16	15	+1	9	
3	Kazakhstan	5	2	0	1	2	13	14	−1	7	
4	Italy (H)	5	1	1	1	2	11	13	−2	6 (Note: Italy 3–2 China)	
5	China	5	2	0	0	3	10	10	0	6	
6	Netherlands	5	1	1	0	3	11	14	−3	5	Relegated to the 2017 Division II A

Source: IIHF
Rules for classification: 1) points; 2) head-to-head points; 3) head-to-head goal difference; 4) head-to-head number of goals scored; 5) result against closest best-ranked team outside tied teams; 6) result against second-best ranked team outside tied teams; 7) seeding before tournament.
(H) Host

=== Match results ===
All times are local (Central European Summer Time – UTC+2).

4 April 2016; 13:30	Kazakhstan	2–5 (2–1, 0–2, 0–2)	Latvia	Pala Hodegart, Asiago; Attendance: 40

Game reference

Aizhan Raushanova
Goalies
Evija Tētiņa
Referee:
(Slovakia) Nikoleta Celárová
Linesmen:
(Italy) Mirjam Gruber
(Slovakia) Michaela Kúdeľová

Tukhtieva (Fux) (SH) – 12:48	1–0
	1–1	13:01 – Bičevska (Ozmena) (PP)
Fux (Tukhtieva) – 15:56	2–1
	2–2	37:15 – Miljone (Ag. Apsīte)
	2–3	39:51 – Miljone (Ai. Apsīte)
	2–4	46:39 – Miljone (SH)
	2–5	51:46 – Koka

12 min
Penalties
6 min
32
Shots
34

4 April 2016; 17:00	Hungary	2–1 (1–0, 0–1, 1–0)	Netherlands	Pala Hodegart, Asiago; Attendance: 320

Game reference

Anikó Németh
Goalies
Claudia van Leeuwen
Referee:
(Finland) Maija Kontturi
Linesmen:
(Switzerland) Anne-Ruth Kuonen
(United States) Jodi Price

Trencsényi (Medgyes) (PP) – 04:10	1–0
	1–1	35:58 – Barbier (Hamers)
Somogyi (Ungar) – 49:02	2–1

6 min
Penalties
6 min
32
Shots
11

4 April 2016; 20:30	Italy	3–2 (1–1, 1–1, 1–0)	China	Pala Hodegart, Asiago; Attendance: 480

Game reference

Daniela Klotz
Goalies
Wang Yuqing
Referee:
(Germany) Ramona Weiss
Linesmen:
(Poland) Joanna Pobożniak
(Germany) Svenja Strohmenger

	0–1	09:29 – Zhang (Kong, Wang W.)
Furlani (Larger, Dalpra) (PP2) – 16:29	1–1
Dalpra (De la Forest de Divonne, Furlani) (PP) – 24:04	2–1
	2–2	39:58 – Zhang (Yu, Fang) (PP)
Furlani (Mistrotofolo, Bettarini) (PP) – 51:56	3–2

6 min
Penalties
18 min
15
Shots
12

5 April 2016; 13:30	Latvia	2–5 (0–2, 1–1, 1–2)	Hungary	Pala Hodegart, Asiago; Attendance: 70

Game reference

Evija Tētiņa
Goalies
Anikó Németh
Referee:
(Canada) Lacey Senuk
Linesmen:
(Switzerland) Anina Egli
(Slovakia) Michaela Kúdeľová

	0–1	02:17 – Medgyes (PP)
	0–2	06:15 – Horváth (Pintér)
Daugava (Mihejenko, Koka) (PP) – 25:42	1–2
	1–3	30:37 – Rónai (B. Németh)
	1–4	46:48 – Trencsényi (Jókai Szilágyi, Brgles) (PP)
Koka (Petersone) – 50:08	2–4
	2–5	55:17 – Brgles (B. Németh)

4 min
Penalties
8 min
25
Shots
36

5 April 2016; 17:00	China	1–2 (0–0, 0–1, 1–1)	Kazakhstan	Pala Hodegart, Asiago; Attendance: 50

Game reference

Wang Yuqing
Goalies
Aizhan Raushanova
Referee:
(Germany) Ramona Weiss
Linesmen:
(Italy) Mirjam Gruber
(Switzerland) Anne-Ruth Kuonen

	0–1	36:01 – Tukhtieva (Koroleva, Nurgalieva)
Kong (Fang, Yu) – 51:25	1–1
	1–2	51:49 – Fux (Koroleva, Tukhtieva)

8 min
Penalties
12 min
36
Shots
31

5 April 2016; 20:30	Netherlands	2–1 GWS (0–0, 1–0, 0–1) (OT 0–0) (SO: 1–0)	Italy	Pala Hodegart, Asiago; Attendance: 700

Game reference
Claudia van Leeuwen	Goalies	Daniela Klotz	Referee: (Slovakia) Nikoleta Celárová; Linesmen: (United States) Jodi Price (Germany) Svenja Strohmenger
Van Nes – 31:01 / 1–0; / 1–1 / 50:18 – De la Forest de Divonne (Ricca) (PP)			Referee: (Slovakia) Nikoleta Celárová; Linesmen: (United States) Jodi Price (Germany) Svenja Strohmenger
Hamers (miss); Wielenga (miss); De Jong; De Jong	Shootout	Larger; (miss) Furlani; (miss) Dalpra; (miss) Larger	Referee: (Slovakia) Nikoleta Celárová; Linesmen: (United States) Jodi Price (Germany) Svenja Strohmenger
43 min	Penalties	10 min	Referee: (Slovakia) Nikoleta Celárová; Linesmen: (United States) Jodi Price (Germany) Svenja Strohmenger
25	Shots	32	Referee: (Slovakia) Nikoleta Celárová; Linesmen: (United States) Jodi Price (Germany) Svenja Strohmenger

7 April 2016; 13:30	Netherlands	1–3 (1–0, 0–2, 0–1)	China	Pala Hodegart, Asiago; Attendance: 50

Game reference

Claudia van Leeuwen
Goalies
Wang Yuqing
Referee:
(Canada) Lacey Senuk
Linesmen:
(Poland) Joanna Pobożniak
(Germany) Svenja Strohmenger

Wielenga (Van Nes, Tjin-A-Ton) – 13:57	1–0
	1–1	29:19 – Liu Z. (Zhang, Kong) (PP)
	1–2	36:33 – Kong (Zhang)
	1–3	44:43 – Fang (Kong, Zhang)

18 min
Penalties
4 min
21
Shots
28

7 April 2016; 17:00	Kazakhstan	2–3 (1–1, 1–1, 0–1)	Hungary	Pala Hodegart, Asiago; Attendance: 65

Game reference

Aizhan Raushanova
Goalies
Anikó Németh
Referee:
(Slovakia) Nikoleta Celárová
Linesmen:
(Slovakia) Michaela Kúdeľová
(Switzerland) Anne-Ruth Kuonen

Koroleva (Ryspek, Moldabai) (PP) – 11:19	1–0
	1–1	12:32 – Jókai-Szilágyi (Medgyes)
Felzink (Tukhtieva) – 20:36	2–1
	2–2	31:08 – Brgles (Jókai-Szilágyi) (PP)
	2–3	48:00 – Dabasi (Tóth, Kiss)

6 min
Penalties
8 min
21
Shots
34

7 April 2016; 20:30	Latvia	4–3 (1–1, 1–1, 2–1)	Italy	Pala Hodegart, Asiago; Attendance: 450

Game reference

Evija Tētiņa
Goalies
Daniela Klotz
Referee:
(Finland) Maija Kontturi
Linesmen:
(Switzerland) Anina Egli
(United States) Jodi Price

Petersone (Bicevska, Koka) – 00:14	1–0
	1–1	15:13 – Furlani (Bettarini)
	1–2	32:00 – De la Forest de Divonne (Bettarini, Dalpra) (PP)
Koka (Kubliņa) – 38:44	2–2
	2–3	49:39 – Gius (Mistrotofolo)
Miljone (Geca-Miljone) – 52:55	3–3
Miljone (Geca-Miljone) – 58:12	4–3

10 min
Penalties
8 min
27
Shots
36

8 April 2016; 13:30	Netherlands	3–6 (1–1, 1–1, 1–4)	Kazakhstan	Pala Hodegart, Asiago; Attendance: 80

Game reference

Claudia van Leeuwen
Bianka Bos
Goalies
Aizhan Raushanova
Referee:
(Germany) Ramona Weiss
Linesmen:
(Switzerland) Anina Egli
(Italy) Mirjam Gruber

	0–1	06:36 – Ryspek (Fux) (SH)
Haverkorn van Rijsewijk (Barbier, Huisman) (PP) – 09:11	1–1
	1–2	24:47 – Ryspek (Koroleva, Likhaus)
Hamers (Tjin-A-Ton, Van Nes) – 39:14	2–2
	2–3	40:57 – Fux (Feklistova)
	2–4	43:17 – Moldabai (Fux, Tukhtieva) (PP)
	2–5	46:12 – Fux (Tukhtieva, Moldabai) (PP)
Wielenga (Van Nes, Tegelaar) (PP) – 58:18	3–5
	3–6	59:45 – Fux (ENG)

8 min
Penalties
10 min
35
Shots
20

8 April 2016; 17:00	China	1–3 (0–1, 1–0, 0–2)	Latvia	Pala Hodegart, Asiago; Attendance: 40

Game reference

Wang Yuqing
Goalies
Evija Tētiņa
Referee:
(Finland) Maija Kontturi
Linesmen:
(Poland) Joanna Pobożniak
(United States) Jodi Price

	0–1	04:50 – Kubliņa (Ag. Apsīte)
Kong (Zhao) – 38:27	1–1
	1–2	57:01 – Petersone (Koka)
	1–3	59:46 – Miljone (ENG)

4 min
Penalties
2 min
30
Shots
40

8 April 2016; 20:30	Hungary	4–2 (2–0, 2–1, 0–1)	Italy	Pala Hodegart, Asiago; Attendance: 550

Game reference

Anikó Németh
Goalies
Eugenia Pompanin
Daniela Klotz
Referee:
(Canada) Lacey Senuk
Linesmen:
(Slovakia) Michaela Kúdeľová
(Germany) Svenja Strohmenger

Pintér (Kiss) – 18:14	1–0
Dabasi (Jókai-Szilágyi) – 18:24	2–0
B. Németh (PP) – 22:28	3–0
Horváth (Dabasi) – 33:33	4–0
	4–1	34:46 – Carignano (Saletta, Gius)
	4–2	47:42 – De la Forest de Divonne (Dalpra)

6 min
Penalties
12 min
32
Shots
19

10 April 2016; 13:30	China	3–1 (1–0, 1–0, 1–1)	Hungary	Pala Hodegart, Asiago; Attendance: 150

Game reference

Wamg Yuqing
Goalies
Renata Poltzer
Referee:
(Slovakia) Nikoleta Celárová
Linesmen:
(Switzerland) Anina Egli
(Poland) Joanna Pobożniak

Yu (He) – 03:06	1–0
Zhang (Kong) – 38:05	2–0
	2–1	58:26 – Trencsényi (Pinter) (PP, EA)
Zhang (Kong) (ENG) – 59:31	3–1

4 min
Penalties
8 min
13
Shots
29

10 April 2016; 17:00	Latvia	2–4 (1–3, 1–0, 0–1)	Netherlands	Pala Hodegart, Asiago; Attendance: 110

Game reference

Kristiāna Apsīte
Goalies
Bianka Bos
Referee:
(Canada) Lacey Senuk
Linesmen:
(Italy) Mirjam Gruber
(United States) Jodi Price

	0–1	02:40 – Van Nes (Tjin-A-Ton, Tegelaar)
	0–2	06:43 – De Jong (Zwarthoed, Wielenga) (PP)
Miljone (Mihejenko, Ag. Apsīte) (PP) – 16:11	1–2
	1–3	16:58 – Barbier (Schollaardt)
Pētersone (Koka, Bičevska) – 35:54	2–3
	2–4	56:34 – Zwarthoed (Wielenga, Wortel)

14 min
Penalties
20 min
33
Shots
32

10 April 2016; 20:30	Italy	2–1 GWS (0–0, 0–1, 1–0) (OT 0–0) (SO: 1–0)	Kazakhstan	Pala Hodegart, Asiago; Attendance: 700

Game reference
Daniela Klotz	Goalies	Aizhan Raushanova	Referee: (Finland) Maija Kontturi; Linesmen: (Slovakia) Michaela Kúdeľová (Switzerland) Anne-Ruth Kuonen
/ 0–1 / 32:50 – Konysheva; Bettarini (Furlani) – 45:28 / 1–1			Referee: (Finland) Maija Kontturi; Linesmen: (Slovakia) Michaela Kúdeľová (Switzerland) Anne-Ruth Kuonen
Larger (miss); Furlani; Dalpra (miss); Furlani	Shootout	(miss) Fux; Tukhtieva; (miss) Ryspek; (miss) Tukhtieva	Referee: (Finland) Maija Kontturi; Linesmen: (Slovakia) Michaela Kúdeľová (Switzerland) Anne-Ruth Kuonen
4 min	Penalties	10 min	Referee: (Finland) Maija Kontturi; Linesmen: (Slovakia) Michaela Kúdeľová (Switzerland) Anne-Ruth Kuonen
47	Shots	17	Referee: (Finland) Maija Kontturi; Linesmen: (Slovakia) Michaela Kúdeľová (Switzerland) Anne-Ruth Kuonen

=== Awards and statistics ===
==== Awards ====
- Best players selected by the directorate:
  - Best Goalkeeper: (Hungary) Anikó Németh
  - Best Defenseman: (Hungary) Bernadett Németh
  - Best Forward: (Kazakhstan) Alyona Fux

Source: IIHF.com

==== Scoring leaders ====
List shows the top skaters sorted by points, then goals.

	Player	GP	G	A	Pts	+/−	PIM	POS
(Kazakhstan)	Alyona Fux	5	5	3	8	+4	0	F
(China)	Minghui Kong	5	3	5	8	+7	2	F
(Kazakhstan)	Zarina Tukhtieva	5	2	6	8	+1	2	F
(Latvia)	Līga Miljone	5	7	0	7	0	2	F
(China)	Mengying Zhang	5	4	3	7	+5	4	F
(Latvia)	Iveta Koka	5	3	4	7	+4	4	F
(Italy)	Chelsea Furlani	5	4	2	6	–2	4	F
(Netherlands)	Bieke van Nes	5	2	3	5	+1	10	F
(Netherlands)	Savine Wielenga	5	2	3	5	–1	4	F
(Italy)	Anna De la Forest	5	3	1	4	–2	0	F
(Latvia)	Ieva Pētersone	5	3	1	4	+3	6	F

GP = Games played; G = Goals; A = Assists; Pts = Points; +/− = Plus/minus; PIM = Penalties in minutes; POS = Position
Source: IIHF.com

==== Leading goaltenders ====
Only the top five goaltenders, based on save percentage, who have played at least 40% of their team's minutes, are included in this list.

	Player	TOI	GA	GAA	SA	Sv%	SO
(China)	Yuquing Wang	298:42	9	1.81	135	93.33	0
(Kazakhstan)	Aizhan Raushanova	304:38	14	2.76	186	92.47	0
(Latvia)	Evija Tētiņa	240:00	11	2.75	134	91.79	0
(Hungary)	Anikó Németh	240:00	7	1.75	76	90.79	0
(Netherlands)	Claudia van Leeuwen	226:26	10	2.65	108	90.74	0

TOI = Time on ice (minutes:seconds); SA = Shots against; GA = Goals against; GAA = Goals against average; Sv% = Save percentage; SO = Shutouts
Source: IIHF.com
