= 2017 IIHF Women's World Championship Division I =

International ice hockey tournament

Tournament details
- Host countries: Austria; Poland
- Venue: 2 (in 2 host cities)
- Dates: 15–21 April 2017; 8–14 April 2017
- Teams: 12

The 2017 IIHF Women's World Championship Division I consisted of two international ice hockey tournaments organized by the International Ice Hockey Federation. Division I A and Division I B represent the second and third tier of the IIHF Women's World Championship.

At the 2017 IIHF annual congress it was decided that the Top Division would expand from eight to ten teams. As a result, all relegations from the 2017 tournaments were cancelled, and there would also be no relegation in all 2018 tournaments.

== Venues ==
Division I Group A	Division I Group B
Graz	Katowice
Eisstadion Liebenau; Capacity: 4,050	Katowice Satelita; Capacity: 1,500

== Division I Group A ==
2017 IIHF Women's World Championship Division I A
Tournament details
- Host country: Austria
- City: Graz
- Venue: 1 (in 1 host city)
- Dates: 15–21 April 2017
- Teams: 6

Tournament statistics
- Games played: 15
- Goals scored: 65 (4.33 per game)
- Attendance: 5,454 (364 per game)
- Scoring leader: (Austria) Denise Altmann (12 points)

Official website
- www.iihf.com

The Division I Group A tournament was played in Graz, Austria, from 15 to 21 April 2017.

=== Participating teams ===
Team	Qualification
Japan	Placed 8th in Top Division last year and were relegated.
France	Placed 2nd in Division I A last year.
Austria	Hosts; placed 3rd in Division I A last year.
Denmark	Placed 4th in Division I A last year.
Norway	Placed 5th in Division I A last year.
Hungary	Placed 1st in Division I B last year and were promoted.

=== Match officials ===
4 referees and 7 linesmen were selected for the tournament.

Referees

- (Germany) Tijana Haack
- (Netherlands) Debby Hengst
- (Finland) Maija Kontturi
- (United States) Kristine Morrison

Linesmen

- (Italy) Mirjam Gruber
- (Austria) Julia Kainberger
- (Switzerland) Anne Kuonen
- (United States) Jodi Price
- (Czech Republic) Michaela Štefková
- (Canada) Vanessa Stratton
- (Germany) Svenja Strohmenger

=== Final standings ===
Pos	Team	Pld	W	OTW	OTL	L	GF	GA	GD	Pts	Promotion
1	Japan	5	5	0	0	0	17	4	+13	15	Promoted to the 2019 Top Division
2	Austria (H)	5	4	0	0	1	20	12	+8	12	
3	Norway	5	2	0	0	3	17	14	+3	6 (Note: NOR: 3 Pts, +4 GD; DEN: 3 Pts, 0 GD; HUN: 3 Pts, −4 GD)	
4	Denmark	5	2	0	0	3	5	12	−7	6	
5	Hungary	5	2	0	0	3	5	11	−6	6	
6	France	5	0	0	0	5	1	12	−11	0	

Source: IIHF
Rules for classification: 1) points; 2) head-to-head points; 3) head-to-head goal difference; 4) head-to-head number of goals scored; 5) result against closest best-ranked team outside tied teams; 6) result against second-best ranked team outside tied teams; 7) seeding before tournament.
(H) Host

=== Match results ===
All times are local (Central European Summer Time – UTC+2).

15 April 2017; 13:00	Denmark	1–0 (1–0, 0–0, 0–0)	France	Eisstadion Liebenau, Graz; Attendance: 52

Game reference
Lisa Jensen	Goalies	Caroline Baldin	Referee: (Germany) Tijana Haack; Linesmen: (Austria) Julia Kainberger (Germany) Svenja Strohmenger
Brix (Frandsen) (SH) – 19:58 / 1–0			Referee: (Germany) Tijana Haack; Linesmen: (Austria) Julia Kainberger (Germany) Svenja Strohmenger
14 min	Penalties	10 min	Referee: (Germany) Tijana Haack; Linesmen: (Austria) Julia Kainberger (Germany) Svenja Strohmenger
16	Shots	32	Referee: (Germany) Tijana Haack; Linesmen: (Austria) Julia Kainberger (Germany) Svenja Strohmenger

15 April 2017; 16:30	Hungary	0–1 (0–1, 0–0, 0–0)	Japan	Eisstadion Liebenau, Graz; Attendance: 228

Game reference
Anikó Németh	Goalies	Nana Fujimoto	Referee: (Finland) Maija Kontturi; Linesmen: (Switzerland) Anne Kuonen (Czech Republic) Michaela Štefková
0–1 / 06:51 – A. Toko (PP)			Referee: (Finland) Maija Kontturi; Linesmen: (Switzerland) Anne Kuonen (Czech Republic) Michaela Štefková
8 min	Penalties	2 min	Referee: (Finland) Maija Kontturi; Linesmen: (Switzerland) Anne Kuonen (Czech Republic) Michaela Štefková
11	Shots	34	Referee: (Finland) Maija Kontturi; Linesmen: (Switzerland) Anne Kuonen (Czech Republic) Michaela Štefková

15 April 2017; 20:00	Norway	4–6 (2–2, 0–2, 2–2)	Austria	Eisstadion Liebenau, Graz; Attendance: 669

Game reference

Ena Nystrøm
Linnea Olsson Holterud
Goalies
Jessica Ekrt
Referee:
(United States) Kristine Morrison
Linesmen:
(United States) Jodi Price
(Canada) Vanessa Stratton

	0–1	01:12 – Wittich (Altmann, Schafzahl) (PP)
	0–2	04:49 – Vlcek (Hummel)
Dalen (Bialik) – 06:21	1–2
Haug Hansen (Fischer, Olafsen) (PP) – 18:33	2–2
	2–3	28:40 – Altmann (Schafzahl, Matzka)
	2–4	38:27 – Altmann (Schafzahl, Fazokas)
	2–5	40:57 – Wittich (Altmann, Meixner) (PP2)
Sirum (Fischer, Holøs) – 46:12	3–5
	3–6	48:53 – Beiter (Hanser, Weber) (PP)
Dalen – 58:42	4–6

14 min
Penalties
10 min
31
Shots
33

16 April 2017; 13:00	Japan	3–0 (1–0, 1–0, 1–0)	Denmark	Eisstadion Liebenau, Graz; Attendance: 72

Game reference

Akane Konishi
Goalies
Lisa Jensen
Referee:
(United States) Kristine Morrison
Linesmen:
(Italy) Mirjam Gruber
(Canada) Vanessa Stratton

Osawa (M. Fujimoto) – 09:23	1–0
Ukita (Yoneyama, A. Toko) – 33:40	2–0
Nakamura (Osawa, Hori) – 41:56	3–0

2 min
Penalties
8 min
35
Shots
6

16 April 2017; 16:30	France	0–3 (0–1, 0–1, 0–1)	Norway	Eisstadion Liebenau, Graz; Attendance: 107

Game reference

Caroline Baldin
Goalies
Ena Nystrøm
Referee:
(Finland) Maija Kontturi
Linesmen:
(United States) Jodi Price
(Germany) Svenja Strohmenger

0–1	01:12 – Haug Hansen (Morset, Biseth Engmann)
0–2	33:46 – Furulund (Sirum, Fischer)
0–3	47:57 – Tendenes (Bialik, Haug Hansen)

2 min
Penalties
6 min
20
Shots
25

16 April 2017; 20:00	Austria	4–2 (1–1, 2–1, 1–0)	Hungary	Eisstadion Liebenau, Graz; Attendance: 618

Game reference

Theresa Hornich
Goalies
Anikó Németh
Referee:
(Netherlands) Debby Hengst
Linesmen:
(Switzerland) Anne Kuonen
(Czech Republic) Michaela Štefková

	0–1	03:11 – Gasparics (Kiss-Simon)
Hanser (Weber, Beiter) – 11:14	1–1
Schafzahl (Wittich, Altmann) (PP) – 22:40	2–1
	2–2	31:14 – Dabasi (B. Németh, Tóth) (PP)
Altmann (Wittich, Schafzahl) (PP2) – 36:18	3–2
Altmann (Meixner, Fazokas) – 46:09	4–2

12 min
Penalties
22 min
34
Shots
22

18 April 2017; 13:00	Japan	5–3 (2–2, 2–0, 1–1)	Norway	Eisstadion Liebenau, Graz; Attendance: 87

Game reference

Nana Fujimoto
Goalies
Ena Nystrøm
Referee:
(Netherlands) Debby Hengst
Linesmen:
(Czech Republic) Michaela Štefková
(Germany) Svenja Strohmenger

	0–1	03:13 – Haug Hansen (Sirum, Fischer)
	0–2	08:51 – Bialik (Haug Hansen, Dalen) (PP)
Osawa (Yoneyama) (SH) – 09:07	1–2
Hosoyamada (Yoneyama) (PP) – 19:21	2–2
Hosoyamada (A. Toko) (PP) – 34:38	3–2
Shishiuchi (Yoneyama, Osawa) (PP) – 38:31	4–2
	4–3	41:56 – Haug Hansen (Tendenes, Fischer) (PP)
Hosoyamada (SH, ENG) – 59:06	5–3

12 min
Penalties
14 min
48
Shots
19

18 April 2017; 16:30	Hungary	2–0 (1–0, 0–0, 1–0)	Denmark	Eisstadion Liebenau, Graz; Attendance: 132

Game reference
Anikó Németh	Goalies	Lisa Jensen	Referee: (Germany) Tijana Haack; Linesmen: (Italy) Mirjam Gruber (Austria) Julia Kainberger
K. Jókai Szilágyi (T. Horváth, Z. Jókai Szilágyi) – 07:52 / 1–0; Gasparics (PS) – 59:05 / 2–0			Referee: (Germany) Tijana Haack; Linesmen: (Italy) Mirjam Gruber (Austria) Julia Kainberger
6 min	Penalties	18 min	Referee: (Germany) Tijana Haack; Linesmen: (Italy) Mirjam Gruber (Austria) Julia Kainberger
20	Shots	13	Referee: (Germany) Tijana Haack; Linesmen: (Italy) Mirjam Gruber (Austria) Julia Kainberger

18 April 2017; 20:00	France	1–3 (0–0, 1–2, 0–1)	Austria	Eisstadion Liebenau, Graz; Attendance: 603

Game reference

Jeanne Morin
Goalies
Theresa Hornich
Referee:
(United States) Kristine Morrison
Linesmen:
(United States) Jodi Price
(Canada) Vanessa Stratton

	0–1	26:44 – Altmann (Meixner)
Escudero (Parment, Rozier) – 35:33	1–1
	1–2	39:14 – Weber (Matzka, Granitz)
	1–3	44:21 – Meixner (Granitz)

4 min
Penalties
6 min
27
Shots
25

20 April 2017; 13:00	France	0–1 (0–0, 0–1, 0–0)	Hungary	Eisstadion Liebenau, Graz; Attendance: 84

Game reference
Caroline Baldin	Goalies	Anikó Németh	Referee: (Finland) Maija Kontturi; Linesmen: (Italy) Mirjam Gruber (Switzerland) Anne Kuonen
0–1 / 23:02 – Huszák (Kiss-Simon) (PP)			Referee: (Finland) Maija Kontturi; Linesmen: (Italy) Mirjam Gruber (Switzerland) Anne Kuonen
8 min	Penalties	4 min	Referee: (Finland) Maija Kontturi; Linesmen: (Italy) Mirjam Gruber (Switzerland) Anne Kuonen
23	Shots	22	Referee: (Finland) Maija Kontturi; Linesmen: (Italy) Mirjam Gruber (Switzerland) Anne Kuonen

20 April 2017; 16:30	Denmark	3–1 (2–1, 0–0, 1–0)	Norway	Eisstadion Liebenau, Graz; Attendance: 127

Game reference

Lisa Jensen
Goalies
Ena Nystrøm
Referee:
(Germany) Tijana Haack
Linesmen:
(Austria) Julia Kainberger
(Germany) Svenja Strohmenger

Andersen (N. Jensen) – 09:41	1–0
	1–1	14:22 – Lovdal (Furulund, Olafsen)
Brix (N. Jensen) (PP) – 17:32	2–1
Friis-Hansen (Persson) – 42:32	3–1

4 min
Penalties
10 min
21
Shots
29

20 April 2017; 20:00	Austria	1–4 (0–2, 1–2, 0–0)	Japan	Eisstadion Liebenau, Graz; Attendance: 1,138

Game reference

Jessica Ekrt
Theresa Hornich
Goalies
Nana Fujimoto
Referee:
(Netherlands) Debby Hengst
Linesmen:
(United States) Jodi Price
(Canada) Vanessa Stratton

	0–1	11:36 – Kubo (Ukita)
	0–2	16:22 – Kubo (Koike, Ukita) (PP)
	0–3	23:45 – M. Fujimoto (Yoneyama)
	0–4	27:04 – Suzuki (H. Toko)
Beiter (Weber, Fazokas) (PP) – 35:32	1–4

4 min
Penalties
8 min
19
Shots
28

21 April 2017; 13:00	Norway	6–0 (3–0, 0–0, 3–0)	Hungary	Eisstadion Liebenau, Graz; Attendance: 108

Game reference

Ena Nystrøm
Goalies
Anikó Németh
Vanessa Horváth
Referee:
(Netherlands) Debby Hengst
Linesmen:
(Austria) Julia Kainberger
(Czech Republic) Michaela Štefková

Morset (Bialik, Dalen) – 04:04	1–0
Bialik – 14:58	2–0
Dalen (Bialik, Morset) – 17:17	3–0
Holøs (Sirum) (PP) – 40:24	4–0
Sirum – 41:20	5–0
Dalen (Bialik) – 52:01	6–0

8 min
Penalties
18 min
33
Shots
24

21 April 2017; 16:30	Japan	4–0 (3–0, 1–0, 0–0)	France	Eisstadion Liebenau, Graz; Attendance: 87

Game reference

Akane Konishi
Goalies
Jeanne Morin
Referee:
(Germany) Tijana Haack
Linesmen:
(Italy) Mirjam Gruber
(Switzerland) Anne Kuonen

Ono – 02:45	1–0
Enomoto (Ono) – 05:41	2–0
Kubo (H. Toko) – 12:07	3–0
H. Toko (M. Fujimoto, Kubo) – 38:25	4–0

8 min
Penalties
2 min
40
Shots
14

21 April 2017; 20:00	Austria	6–1 (0–1, 4–0, 2–0)	Denmark	Eisstadion Liebenau, Graz; Attendance: 1,342

Game reference

Jessica Ekrt
Goalies
Lisa Jensen
Martine Terrida
Referee:
(United States) Kristine Morrison
Linesmen:
(United States) Jodi Price
(Canada) Vanessa Stratton

	0–1	02:14 – Glud (Østergaard, Asperup)
Altmann (Wittich) – 32:32	1–1
Grascher (Vlcek) – 33:01	2–1
Meixner (Altmann, Schafzahl) – 34:25	3–1
Schafzahl – 36:58	4–1
Meixner (Altmann, Kantor (PP) – 40:54	5–1
Altmann (Meixner) (PP) – 50:03	6–1

6 min
Penalties
12 min
41
Shots
24

=== Awards and statistics ===
==== Awards ====
- Best players selected by the directorate:
  - Best Goaltender: (Hungary) Anikó Németh
  - Best Defenceman: (Japan) Ayaka Toko
  - Best Forward: (Austria) Denise Altmann

Source: IIHF.com

==== Scoring leaders ====
List shows the top skaters sorted by points, then goals.

Player	GP	G	A	Pts	+/−	PIM	POS
(Austria) Denise Altmann	5	7	5	12	+6	2	F
(Austria) Anna Meixner	5	3	4	7	+6	2	F
(Norway) Line Bialik	5	2	5	7	+3	4	F
(Austria) Theresa Schafzahl	5	2	5	7	+4	2	F
(Norway) Andrea Schjelderup Dalen	5	4	2	6	+2	0	F
(Norway) Madelen Haug Hansen	5	4	2	6	+2	8	F
(Norway) Millie Sirum	5	2	3	5	+1	6	F
(Austria) Charlotte Wittich	5	2	3	5	+2	2	D
(Norway) Mathea Fischer	5	0	5	5	+4	4	F
(Japan) Haruna Yoneyama	5	0	5	5	+5	0	F

GP = Games played; G = Goals; A = Assists; Pts = Points; +/− = Plus/minus; PIM = Penalties in minutes; POS = Position
Source: IIHF.com

==== Leading goaltenders ====
Only the top five goaltenders, based on save percentage, who have played at least 40% of their team's minutes, are included in this list.

Player	TOI	GA	GAA	SA	Sv%	SO
(Japan) Akane Konishi	120:00	0	0.00	20	100.00	2
(Austria) Jessica Ekrt	152:56	5	1.96	71	92.96	0
(Denmark) Lisa Jensen	280:06	11	2.36	148	92.57	1
(Hungary) Anikó Németh	289:54	10	2.07	133	92.48	2
(France) Caroline Baldin	176:06	5	1.70	63	92.06	0

TOI = Time on ice (minutes:seconds); SA = Shots against; GA = Goals against; GAA = Goals against average; Sv% = Save percentage; SO = Shutouts
Source: IIHF.com

== Division I Group B ==
2017 IIHF Women's World Championship Division I B
Tournament details
- Host country: Poland
- City: Katowice
- Venue: 1 (in 1 host city)
- Dates: 8–14 April 2017
- Teams: 6

Tournament statistics
- Games played: 15
- Goals scored: 78 (5.2 per game)
- Attendance: 4,632 (309 per game)
- Scoring leader: (Slovakia) Nicol Čupková (11 points)

Official website
- www.iihf.com

The Division I Group B tournament was played in Katowice, Poland, from 8 to 14 April 2017.

=== Participating teams ===
Team	Qualification
Slovakia	Placed 6th in Division I A last year and were relegated.
Latvia	Placed 2nd in Division I B last year.
Kazakhstan	Placed 3rd in Division I B last year.
Italy	Placed 4th in Division I B last year.
China	Placed 5th in Division I B last year.
Poland	Hosts; placed 1st in Division II A last year and were promoted.

=== Match officials ===
4 referees and 7 linesmen were selected for the tournament.

Referees

- (Denmark) Maria Füchsel
- (Australia) Ainslie Gardner
- (Canada) Meghan Mallette
- (Austria) Ulrike Winklmayr

Linesmen

- (Belgium) Marine Dinant
- (Germany) Daniela Kiefer
- (Russia) Diana Mokhova
- (Denmark) Trine Phillipsen
- (Poland) Joanna Pobożniak
- (Finland) Jenna Puhakka
- (France) Sueva Torribio

=== Final standings ===
Pos	Team	Pld	W	OTW	OTL	L	GF	GA	GD	Pts	Promotion
1	Slovakia	5	4	0	0	1	22	9	+13	12	Promoted to the 2018 Division I A
2	Kazakhstan	5	3	0	1	1	11	10	+1	10	
3	Latvia	5	3	0	0	2	13	17	−4	9	
4	China	5	2	1	0	2	13	6	+7	8	
5	Italy	5	1	0	1	3	8	12	−4	4	
6	Poland (H)	5	0	1	0	4	11	24	−13	2	

Source: IIHF
Rules for classification: 1) points; 2) head-to-head points; 3) head-to-head goal difference; 4) head-to-head number of goals scored; 5) result against closest best-ranked team outside tied teams; 6) result against second-best ranked team outside tied teams; 7) seeding before tournament.
(H) Host

=== Match results ===
All times are local (Central European Summer Time – UTC+2).

8 April 2017; 13:00	Italy	1–4 (0–2, 1–1, 0–1)	Latvia	Katowice Satelita, Katowice; Attendance: 65

Game reference

Daniela Klotz
Goalies
Kritiāna Apsīte
Referee:
(Austria) Ulrike Winklmayr
Linesmen:
(Belgium) Marine Ninant
(Germany) Daniela Kiefer

	0–1	00:33 – Miljone (Kublina)
	0–2	15:02 – Miljone (Ag. Apsīte, Dekmeijere-Trigubova)
Gius (Mistrotofolo, Stocker) – 32:42	1–2
	1–3	37:07 – Lagzdiņa (Ai. Apsīte)
	1–4	59:59 – Miljone (Kublina) (ENG)

6 min
Penalties
8 min
53
Shots
24

8 April 2017; 16:30	China	2–0 (1–0, 0–0, 1–0)	Kazakhstan	Katowice Satelita, Katowice; Attendance: 85

Game reference
Wang Yuqing	Goalies	Daria Dmitrieva	Referee: (Australia) Ainslie Gardner; Linesmen: (Poland) Joanna Pobozniak (Finland) Jenna Puhakka
Zhang M. (Kong) (SH) – 02:15 / 1–0; Fang (Kong, Zhao) (PP2) – 59:57 / 2–0			Referee: (Australia) Ainslie Gardner; Linesmen: (Poland) Joanna Pobozniak (Finland) Jenna Puhakka
8 min	Penalties	6 min	Referee: (Australia) Ainslie Gardner; Linesmen: (Poland) Joanna Pobozniak (Finland) Jenna Puhakka
26	Shots	26	Referee: (Australia) Ainslie Gardner; Linesmen: (Poland) Joanna Pobozniak (Finland) Jenna Puhakka

8 April 2017; 20:00	Poland	2–7 (0–1, 2–4, 0–2)	Slovakia	Katowice Satelita, Katowice; Attendance: 850

Game reference

Martyna Sass
Goalies
Romana Kiapešová
Referee:
(Denmark) Maria Füchsel
Linesmen:
(Russia) Diana Mokhova
(France) Sueva Torribio

	0–1	08:31 – Obercianová (Kežmarská, Korenková)
	0–2	20:40 – Čupková (Klimášová) (PP)
Chrapek (Późniewska) (PP2) – 22:50	1–2
	1–3	26:08 – Zálešaková (Košecká)
	1–4	28:29 – Čupková (Kapustová)
Sopata – 36:00	2–4
	2–5	38:16 – Rumanová (Maskaľová)
	2–6	52:24 – Čupková (Kapustová, Ihnaťová)
	2–7	55:54 – Ihnaťová (Kapustová, Čupková) (PP)

10 min
Penalties
10 min
21
Shots
49

9 April 2017; 13:00	Latvia	3–2 (1–0, 1–2, 1–0)	China	Katowice Satelita, Katowice; Attendance: 87

Game reference

Kritiāna Apsīte
Goalies
Wang Yuqing
Referee:
(Canada) Meghan Mallette
Linesmen:
(Belgium) Marine Dinant
(France) Sueva Torribio

Miljone (Mihejenko) – 00:39	1–0
	1–1	21:09 – Fang (He X.)
	1–2	30:06 – Tian (Fang, Lyu)
Mihejenko (Dekmeijere-Trigubova, Miljone) – 37:09	2–2
Pētersone (Miljone, Dekmeijere-Trigubova) (PP) – 58:21	3–2

10 min
Penalties
6 min
10
Shots
32

9 April 2017; 16:30	Slovakia	3–2 (3–1, 0–0, 0–1)	Italy	Katowice Satelita, Katowice; Attendance: 121

Game reference

Romana Kiapešová
Goalies
Giulia Mazzocchi
Referee:
(Australia) Ainslie Gardner
Linesmen:
(Denmark) Trine Phillipsen
(Poland) Joanna Pobożniak

Obercianová (Vargová) – 01:08	1–0
Ištocyová (Kežmarská) (PP) – 04:50	2–0
Klimešová (Ihnaťová) – 06:09	3–0
	3–1	10:25 – Dalprà (Furlani, Gius)
	3–2	46:57 – Dalprà (Furlani) (PP2)

16 min
Penalties
12 min
23
Shots
24

9 April 2017; 20:00	Kazakhstan	3–4 GWS (2–1, 0–2, 1–0) (OT 0–0) (SO: 0–1)	Poland	Katowice Satelita, Katowice; Attendance: 851

Game reference

Aizhan Raushanova
Goalies
Martyna Sass
Referee:
(Austria) Ulrike Winklmayr
Linesmen:
(Germany) Daniela Kiefer
(Finland) Jenna Puhakka

Likhaus (PP) – 06:01	1–0
Fux (Ryspek) – 11:06	2–0
	2–1	11:44 – Wieczorek (Frąckowiak, Bigos)
	2–2	24:39 – Czaplik (Późniewska)
	2–3	28:59 – Bigos (Późniewska)
Fux (Ryspek) – 46:32	3–3

Fux
Koroleva
Tukhtieva (miss)
Fux
Koroleva (miss)
Shootout
(miss) Późniewska
Czaplik
Wieczorek
Wieczorek
Wieczorek
8 min
Penalties
14 min
19
Shots
15

11 April 2017; 13:00	Slovakia	2–1 (2–0, 0–0, 0–1)	China	Katowice Satelita, Katowice; Attendance: 134

Game reference

Romana Kiapešová
Goalies
Wang Yuqing
Referee:
(Denmark) Maria Füchsel
Linesmen:
(Germany) Daniela Kiefer
(France) Sueva Torribio

Čupková (Ištocyová)(PP) – 10:25	1–0
Čupková (Ihnaťová) (SH) – 17:01	2–0
	2–1	49:57 – Zhang M. (Yu, Fang) (PP)

6 min
Penalties
4 min
34
Shots
17

11 April 2017; 16:30	Latvia	1–2 (0–0, 1–0, 0–2)	Kazakhstan	Katowice Satelita, Katowice; Attendance: 50

Game reference

Kritiāna Apsīte
Goalies
Daria Dmitrieva
Referee:
(Australia) Ainslie Gardner
Linesmen:
(Russia) Diana Mokhova
(Poland) Joanna Pobożniak

Pētersone (Miljone) – 24:49	1–0
	1–1	50:38 – Shegebayeva (Felzink)
	1–2	58:52 – Nurgalieva (Likhaus) (PP2)

10 min
Penalties
14 min
24
Shots
18

11 April 2017; 20:00	Poland	1–3 (0–2, 0–1, 1–0)	Italy	Katowice Satelita, Katowice; Attendance: 680

Game reference

Martyna Sass
Gabriela Mizera
Goalies
Daniela Klotz
Referee:
(Canada) Meghan Mallette
Linesmen:
(Denmark) Trine Phillipsen
(Finland) Jenna Puhakka

	0–1	14:26 – Gius (Masperi, Dalprà)
	0–2	18:44 – Dalprà
	0–3	31:02 – Mistrotofolo (Galtieri)
Frąckowiak (Wieczorek) – 46:06	1–3

12 min
Penalties
12 min
12
Shots
24

12 April 2017; 13:00	Kazakhstan	4–2 (1–0, 0–1, 3–1)	Slovakia	Katowice Satelita, Katowice; Attendance: 65

Game reference

Daria Dmitrieva
Goalies
Romana Kiapešová
Referee:
(Canada) Meghan Mallette
Linesmen:
(Denmark) Trine Phillipsen
(Finland) Jenna Puhakka

Nurgalieva (Fux) – 14:01	1–0
	1–1	26:01 – Ihnaťová (Cagáňová, Klimešová)
Kartanbayeva (Shegebayeva) – 48:28	2–1
	2–2	50:04 – Košecká (Kežmarská)
Tukhtieva (Likhaus, Fux) – 50:34	3–2
Tukhtieva (Fux) – 57:07	4–2

6 min
Penalties
4 min
18
Shots
28

12 April 2017; 16:30	Italy	1–2 GWS (0–0, 0–1, 1–0) (OT 0–0) (SO: 0–1)	China	Katowice Satelita, Katowice; Attendance: 80

Game reference
Giulia Mazzocchi	Goalies	Wang Yuqing	Referee: (Austria) Ulrike Winklmayr; Linesmen: (Germany) Daniela Kiefer (Poland) Joanna Pobożniak
/ 0–1 / 26:40 – Lu (Ju, Zhang M.); Furlani (Mattivi, Elliscasis) (PP) – 50:01 / 1–1			Referee: (Austria) Ulrike Winklmayr; Linesmen: (Germany) Daniela Kiefer (Poland) Joanna Pobożniak
Furlani (miss); Dalprà (miss); Gius (miss); Furlani (miss)	Shootout	(miss) Kong; (miss) Wen; (miss) Zhang M. Yu	Referee: (Austria) Ulrike Winklmayr; Linesmen: (Germany) Daniela Kiefer (Poland) Joanna Pobożniak
8 min	Penalties	6 min	Referee: (Austria) Ulrike Winklmayr; Linesmen: (Germany) Daniela Kiefer (Poland) Joanna Pobożniak
22	Shots	34	Referee: (Austria) Ulrike Winklmayr; Linesmen: (Germany) Daniela Kiefer (Poland) Joanna Pobożniak

12 April 2017; 20:00	Latvia	5–4 (3–1, 1–2, 1–1)	Poland	Katowice Satelita, Katowice; Attendance: 540

Game reference

Kritiāna Apsīte
Goalies
Gabriela Mizera
Referee:
(Denmark) Maria Füchsel
Linesmen:
(Belgium) Marine Dinant
(Russia) Diana Mokhova

Kublina (Dekmeijere-Trigubova, Miljone) – 00:38	1–0
	1–1	02:36 – Późniewska (Czaplik)
Pētersone (Stengrevica) – 10:22	2–1
Mihejenko (Miljone) (PP) – 18:58	3–1
	3–2	22:34 – Cygan (Czaplik) (PP)
Miljone – 31:49	4–2
	4–3	32:41 – Późniewska (Frąckowiak)
	4–4	49:47 – Bigos
Ai. Apsīte (Pētersone) – 58:33	5–4

22 min
Penalties
16 min
28
Shots
38

14 April 2017; 13:00	Kazakhstan	2–1 (1–0, 1–1, 0–0)	Italy	Katowice Satelita, Katowice; Attendance: 80

Game reference

Daria Dmitrieva
Goalies
Giulia Mazzocchi
Referee:
(Australia) Ainslie Gardner
Linesmen:
(Belgium) Marine Dinant
(Russia) Diana Mokhova

Aldabergenova (Fux, Ryspek) – 14:55	1–0
	1–1	25:35 – Stocker (Furlani, Mattivi) (PP)
Fux (Tukhtieva) (PP) – 32:38	2–1

10 min
Penalties
12 min
14
Shots
28

14 April 2017; 16:30	Slovakia	8–0 (1–0, 4–0, 3–0)	Latvia	Katowice Satelita, Katowice; Attendance: 124

Game reference

Romana Kiapešová
Goalies
Kritiāna Apsīte
Referee:
(Denmark) Maria Füchsel
Linesmen:
(Poland) Joanna Pobożniak
(Finland) Jenna Puhakka

Čupková – 04:20	1–0
Ihnaťová (Čupková) (PP) – 26:13	2–0
Kapustová (PP) – 31:08	3–0
Frühauf (PP) – 33:02	4–0
Čupková (Kapustová) – 38:54	5–0
Ihnaťová (Čupková) – 43:33	6–0
Drábeková (Čupková, Kapustová) (PP) – 54:18	7–0
Maskaľová (Fáberová) – 55:42	8–0

12 min
Penalties
16 min
32
Shots
14

14 April 2017; 20:00	China	6–0 (1–0, 4–0, 1–0)	Poland	Katowice Satelita, Katowice; Attendance: 820

Game reference

Wang Yuqing
Goalies
Martyna Sass
Gabriela Mizera
Referee:
(Canada) Meghan Mallette
Linesmen:
(Germany) Daniela Kiefer
(Denmark) Trine Phillipsen

Kong (Zhang M.) – 15:14	1–0
Fang (Deng) – 21:02	2–0
Tian (Guan, Deng) – 23:56	3–0
Deng (Yu) – 25:39	4–0
He X. (Kong) – 39:49	5–0
Tian (Fang) (PP) – 49:44	6–0

0 min
Penalties
6 min
36
Shots
19

=== Awards and statistics ===
==== Awards ====
- Best players selected by the directorate:
  - Best Goaltender: (Kazakhstan) Daria Dmitrieva
  - Best Defenceman: (Slovakia) Iveta Klimášová
  - Best Forward: (Latvia) Līga Miljone

Source: IIHF.com

==== Scoring leaders ====
List shows the top skaters sorted by points, then goals.

Player	GP	G	A	Pts	+/−	PIM	POS
(Slovakia) Nicol Čupková	5	7	4	11	+4	4	F
(Latvia) Līga Miljone	5	5	5	10	+4	14	F
(Slovakia) Viktória Ihnaťová	5	4	3	7	+3	6	F
(Kazakhstan) Alyona Fux	5	3	4	7	+4	6	F
(China) Fang Xin	5	3	3	6	+2	0	F
(Slovakia) Jana Kapustová	4	1	5	6	+5	4	F
(Poland) Karolina Późniewska	5	2	3	5	+1	2	F
(Italy) Eleonora Dalprà	5	3	1	4	−2	10	F
(Latvia) Ieva Pētersone	5	3	1	4	−3	2	F
(China) Zhang Mengying	5	2	2	4	+3	0	F

GP = Games played; G = Goals; A = Assists; Pts = Points; +/− = Plus/minus; PIM = Penalties in minutes; POS = Position
Source: IIHF.com

==== Leading goaltenders ====
Only the top five goaltenders, based on save percentage, who have played at least 40% of their team's minutes, are included in this list.

Player	TOI	GA	GAA	SA	Sv%	SO
(China) Wang Yuqing	303:46	6	1.19	111	94.59	2
(Kazakhstan) Daria Dmitrieva	305:00	10	1.97	121	91.74	0
(Slovakia) Romana Kiapešová	299:58	9	1.80	94	90.43	1
(Latvia) Kritiāna Apsīte	299:48	17	3.40	173	90.17	0
(Italy) Giulia Mazzocchi	182:33	7	2.30	71	90.14	0

TOI = Time on ice (minutes:seconds); SA = Shots against; GA = Goals against; GAA = Goals against average; Sv% = Save percentage; SO = Shutouts
Source: IIHF.com
