= Bernadett Németh =

Hungarian ice hockey player (born 1996)

- Born: 6 September 1996 (age 30) Budapest, Hungary
- Height: 165 cm (5 ft 5 in)
- Weight: 56 kg (123 lb; 8 st 11 lb)
- Position: Defense
- Shoots: Left
- EWHL team Former teams: MAC Budapest: Aisulu Almaty; KMH Budapest; Sundsvall/Timrå; Budapest Stars
- National team: Hungary
- Playing career: 2009–present

Bernadett Anita Németh (born 6 September 1996) is a Hungarian ice hockey player and member of the Hungarian national ice hockey team. She has played with MAC Budapest in the European Women's Hockey League (EWHL) and Női OB I bajnokság since 2025.

== Playing career ==
As a junior ice hockey player with the Hungarian national under-18 team, she participated in the Top Division tournaments of the IIHF U18 Women's World Championship in 2013 and 2014, and in both the Division I qualification and Division I tournament in 2012.

As of 2024, Németh had represented Hungary at twelve IIHF World Women's Championships: twice at the Division II A level, three times at the Division I B level, four times at the Division I A level, and at the Top Division tournaments in 2021, 2022, and 2023.

She was named Women's Hockey Player of the Year by the Hungarian Ice Hockey Federation in 2017.

== Personal life ==
Németh's twin sister, Anikó, is an ice hockey goaltender and fellow member of the Hungarian national team.

== Career statistics ==
=== International ===
As of March 2025

Year	Team	Event	Result	GP	G	A	Pts	PIM
2011	Hungary U18	WC18 D1Q	1st	5	0	0	0	4
2012	Hungary U18	WC18 D1	1st	5	0	0	0	2
2012	Hungary	WC D2A	2nd	5	0	0	0	6
2012	Hungary	OGQ	DNQ	3	0	0	0	2
2013	Hungary U18	WC18	6th	5	1	0	1	6
2013	Hungary	WC D2A	1st	5	0	0	0	10
2014	Hungary U18	WC18	8th	5	0	1	1	10
2014	Hungary	WC D1B	3rd	5	1	2	3	4
2015	Hungary	WC D1B	4th	5	0	1	1	2
2016	Hungary	WC D1B	1st	5	1	2	3	14
2016	Hungary	OGQ	DNQ	3	0	0	0	8
2017	Hungary	WC D1A	5th	5	0	1	1	6
2018	Hungary	WC D1A	3rd	5	0	0	0	0
2019	Hungary	WC D1A	1st	5	1	3	4	6
2021	Hungary	WC	9th	4	0	2	2	0
2021	Hungary	OGQ	DNQ	3	0	0	0	4
2022	Hungary	WC	8th	6	0	0	0	0
2023	Hungary	WC	9th	0	0	0	0	0
2024	Hungary	WC D1A	2nd	5	1	0	1	4
2025	Hungary	OGQ	DNQ	3	0	0	0	0
Junior totals				20	1	1	2	22
Senior totals				71	4	11	15	68
