= Chelsea Furlani =

American-Italian ice hockey player (born 1988)

- Born: May 18, 1988 (age 37) Colchester, Vermont, U.S.
- Height: 5 ft 5 in (165 cm)
- Weight: 132 lb (60 kg; 9 st 6 lb)
- Position: Forward
- Shoots: Right
- Current team Former teams: Free agent Vienna Flyers; EV Bozen Eagles
- National team: Italy
- Playing career: 2006–present

Chelsea Marie Furlani (born May 18, 1988) is an American-Italian ice hockey player. She is known as a member of the Italian national ice hockey team and for her accomplished career with the EV Bozen Eagles in the European Women's Hockey League (EWHL) and Italian Hockey League Women (IHLW).

== Playing career ==
=== College ===
Furlani played college ice hockey with the Vermont Catamounts women's ice hockey program in the Hockey East (HEA) conference of the NCAA Division 1. She served as team captain in both her junior and senior seasons. Over four seasons with the team, she recorded 49 points on 25 goals and 24 assists in 132 games.

=== Professional ===
After graduating, Furlani signed with the Vienna Flyers in Austria for the 2010–11 season of the Elite Women's Hockey League (EWHL, renamed European Women's Hockey League in 2019). After one season, she relocated to Bolzano, Italy to play with the EV Bozen 84 Eagles in the Serie A Femminile, the Italian championship league (renamed Italian Hockey League Women—IHLW in 2017). In her first season with the team, she was the top scorer in the Serie A and led the Bozen Eagles to victory in both the Italian championship and the Italian Cup.

She re-signed with the team for the 2012–13 season, during which the Bozen Eagles won the Italian championship again. The Eagles participated in the 2012–13 edition of the IIHF European Women's Champions Cup (EWCC), where Furlani was selected for the all-star team of the semifinal round despite the team's elimination. The Eagles finished fourth in the 2012–13 EWHL season.

During the 2013–14 EWHL season, the Eagles won the EWHL championship for the first time, with Furlani scoring four of the team's seven goals in the final against the Neuberg Highlanders.

== International play ==
Furlani publicly expressed a desire to play for the Italian national team in 2011, while playing in Austria during her first season in Europe. After completing two seasons with the Bozen Eagles, she applied for citizenship in 2013 and was invited to play with the Italian national team in friendly matches. Delays in the naturalization process prevented her from participating in official matches and, in August 2015, EV Bolzano wrote to President of the Republic Sergio Mattarella on her behalf to appeal the situation. In November 2015, the Council of Ministers conferred Italian citizenship to Furlani for special merits, and she returned to competition in January 2016.

Finally able to represent Italy on an official basis, Furlani made a commanding debut with the national team at the Group B tournament of the 2016 IIHF Women's World Championship Division I. Her six points in five games – earned on four goals and two assists – ranked seventh in scoring of all tournament skaters. She was Italy's leading scorer and was selected as best player on the team by the coaches.

Furlani subsequently participated in the World Championship Division I Group B tournaments in 2017, 2022, 2023, and 2024, scoring at least a point at each iteration. She was a key player in Italy's Olympic aspirations ahead of the Games in 2018 and 2022, scoring seven points (6+1) across six games of the qualifiers for PyeongChang 2018 and tallying five points across six games of the qualifiers for Beijing 2022. Despite the team's efforts, Italy did not qualify in either 2018 or 2022.

== Personal life ==
Furlani was born in Colchester, Vermont, United States to a family of Italian descent; her great-grandfather was from San Costanzo in the Marche region of Italy. A citizen of the United States by birth, she gained multiple citizenship as a naturalized Italian citizen in 2015.

A 2010 graduate of the University of Vermont, Furlani holds a bachelor's degree in sports science. She has served in various coaching roles with both the men's and women's teams of EV Bozen.

Furlani married fellow ice hockey player and national team teammate Valentina Bettarini in 2019.

== Career statistics ==
=== International ===
Note: Olympic qualification scoring is not included in career totals

Year	Team	Event	Result	GP	G	A	Pts	PIM
2016	Italy	WC D1B	4th	5	4	2	6	4
2017	Italy	OGQ	DNQ	6	6	1	7	2
2017	Italy	WC D1B	5th	5	1	3	4	2
2022	Italy	OGQ	DNQ	6	4	1	5	4
2022	Italy	WC D1B	3rd	5	2	0	2	2
2023	Italy	WC D1B	3rd	3	1	1	2	0
2024	Italy	WC D1B	3rd	5	0	1	1	2
				23	8	7	15	10

== Awards and honors ==
Award	Year
EV Bozen Eagles
Italian Championship	2012, 2013, 2014, 2015, 2016, 2017, 2018, 2021, 2022
EWHL Championship	2014, 2017
Italian Cup	2012
International
World Championship D1B Best Player on Team	2016
