= Bettarini =

Bettarini is an Italian surname. Notable people with the surname include:

- Cesare Bettarini (1901–1975), Italian actor
- Rebecca Virginia Bettarini (born 1982), Italian businesswoman
- Stefano Bettarini (born 1972), Italian footballer
- Valentina Bettarini (born 1990), Italian ice hockey player

== See also ==
- 7141 Bettarini, a main-belt asteroid
