= Anikó Németh =

Hungarian ice hockey player (born 1996)

- Born: 6 September 1996 (age 30) Budapest, Hungary
- Height: 1.64 m (5 ft 5 in)
- Weight: 67 kg (148 lb; 10 st 8 lb)
- Position: Goaltender
- Catches: Left
- EWHL team Former teams: MAC Budapest: Budapest JA; IF Björklöven; KMH Budapest; Karlskrona HK; HTI Stars; Budapest Stars
- National team: Hungary
- Playing career: 2009–present

Anikó Krisztina Németh (born 6 September 1996) is a Hungarian ice hockey goaltender and member of the Hungarian national team. She has played with MAC Budapest in the European Women's Hockey League (EWHL) since 2026.

== Playing career ==
Németh has also played in the EWHL with KMH Budapest and Budapest Jégkorong Akadémia, and in the Swedish Nationella Damhockeyligan (NDHL; previously DamEttan) with IF Björklöven and Karlskrona HK.

== International play ==
As a youth player with the Hungarian national under-18 team, she made her international debut in the qualification tournament for the 2012 IIHF U18 Women's World Championship Division I and was a key factor in the team securing qualification, earning wins in every game and posting a brilliant .967 save percentage for the tournament. She remained steadfast throughout the 2012 Division I tournament, delivering the tournament's only shutout (earned against Slovakia) and posting a steady .913 save percentage across five games, as Hungary secured promotion to the Top Division for the first time in program history. She went on to play in the Top Division tournaments of the IIHF U18 Women's World Championship in 2013 and 2014, receiving selection by the coaches as a top-three player for Hungary at the 2014 tournament.

Németh has represented Hungary with the senior national team at fourteen IIHF Women's World Championship tournaments – twice at the Division II, Group A level; three times at the Division I, Group B level; five times at the Division I, Group A level; and at the Top Division tournaments in 2021, 2022, 2023, and 2025.

== Personal life ==
Németh's twin sister, Bernadett, is an ice hockey defenseman and also plays with the Hungarian national team.

== Career statistics ==
=== International ===
Year	Team	Event	Result	GP	W	L	MIN	GA	SO	GAA	SV%
2011	Hungary U18	WC18 D1Q	1st	5	4	0	254:43	2	2	0.47	.968
2012	Hungary U18	WC18 D1	1st	5	4	0	305:00	10	1	1.97	.913
2012	Hungary	WC D2A	2nd	4	3	1	179:00	5	1	1.69	.909
2012	Hungary	OGQ	DNQ	2	1	1	119:06	5	0	2.52	.844
2013	Hungary U18	WC18	6th	5	1	4	282:17	16	0	3.40	.890
2013	Hungary	WC D2A	1st	5	4	1	247:04	9	0	2.19	.906
2014	Hungary U18	WC18	8th	5	0	5	298:57	25	0	5.02	.892
2014	Hungary	WC D1B	3rd	5	3	2	300:13	13	0	2.60	.895
2015	Hungary	WC D1B	4th	5	2	3	297:56	12	0	2.42	.912
2016	Hungary	WC D1B	1st	4	4	0	240:00	7	0	1.75	.908
2016	Hungary	OGQ	DNQ	3	2	1	160:00	6	1	2.25	.929
2017	Hungary	WC D1A	5th	5	2	3	289:54	10	2	2.07	.925
2018	Hungary	WC D1A	3rd	5	3	2	298:48	13	1	2.61	.900
2019	Hungary	WC D1A	1st	4	3	1	245:00	3	1	0.73	.968
2021	Hungary	WC	9th	2	0	2	120:00	7	0	3.50	.873
2021	Hungary	OGQ	DNQ	3	2	1	180:00	9	0	3.00	.878
2022	Hungary	WC	8th	6	1	5	356:20	26	0	4.38	.887
2023	Hungary	WC	9th	4	1	3	193:15	13	0	4.04	.877
2026	Hungary	OGQ	DNQ	3	2	1	179:01	5	0	1.68	.924
2024	Hungary	WC D1A	2nd	5	3	2	310:00	4	2	0.77	.955
2025	Hungary	WC	10th	4	0	4	236:24	8	0	2.03	.907
2026	Hungary	WC D1A	2nd	5	4	1	300:19	7	1	1.40	.942

== Awards and honors ==
Award	Year
International
World U18 Top 3 Player on Team	2014
World Championship D1B Best Goaltender	2016
World Championship D1A Best Goaltender	2017
World Championship D1A Best Goaltender	2026
World Championship Top-3 Player on Team	2022
World Championship Top-3 Player on Team	2025
World Championship D1A Top Player on Team	2026
European Women's Hockey League
EWHL Champion	2019
Other
Hungarian Women's Hockey Player of the Year	2014
Hungarian Female Goaltender of the Year	2019
Hungarian Female Goaltender of the Year	2020
Hungarian Female Goaltender of the Year	2023
Hungarian Female Goaltender of the Year	2024
Hungarian Female Goaltender of the Year	2025
