= Michele Brix Nielsen =

Danish ice hockey player (born 1996)

- Born: 10 July 1996 (age 30) Odense, Denmark
- Height: 168 cm (5 ft 6 in)
- Weight: 73 kg (161 lb; 11 st 7 lb)
- Position: Forward
- Shoots: Left
- KvindeLigaen team Former teams: Odense IK; Hvidovre IK; Brynäs IF
- National team: Denmark
- Playing career: 2007–present

Michele Brix Nielsen (born 10 July 1996) is a Danish ice hockey player and member of the Danish national ice hockey team, currently serving as captain of the Odense IK Kvinder in the KvindeLigaen.

== Playing career ==
She has represented Denmark at eight IIHF Women's World Championships, including at the Top Division tournament of the 2021 IIHF Women's World Championship.

Her club career began when she debuted in the DM i ishockey for kvinder at age 12 and she has also played seasons in the Swedish Women's Hockey League (SDHL) and the Elite Women's Hockey League (EWHL).

== Career statistics ==
=== International ===
Year	Team	Event	Result	GP	G	A	Pts	PIM
2013	Denmark	OGQ	DNQ	6	1	1	2	0
2013	Denmark	WC D1A	2nd	5	0	0	0	0
2014	Denmark	WC D1A	2nd	5	0	0	0	2
2015	Denmark	WC D1A	4th	5	1	2	3	0
2016	Denmark	WC D1A	4th	5	1	4	5	0
2017	Denmark	WC D1A	4th	5	2	0	2	2
2017	Denmark	OGQ	DNQ	3	1	0	1	2
2018	Denmark	WC D1A	4th	5	1	0	1	2
2019	Denmark	WC D1A	2nd	5	1	1	2	0
2021	Denmark	WC	10th	4	0	0	0	4
2021	Denmark	OGQ	Q	3	0	2	2	0
Totals				51	8	10	18	12
