= Linda De Rocco =

Italian ice hockey player (born 1986)

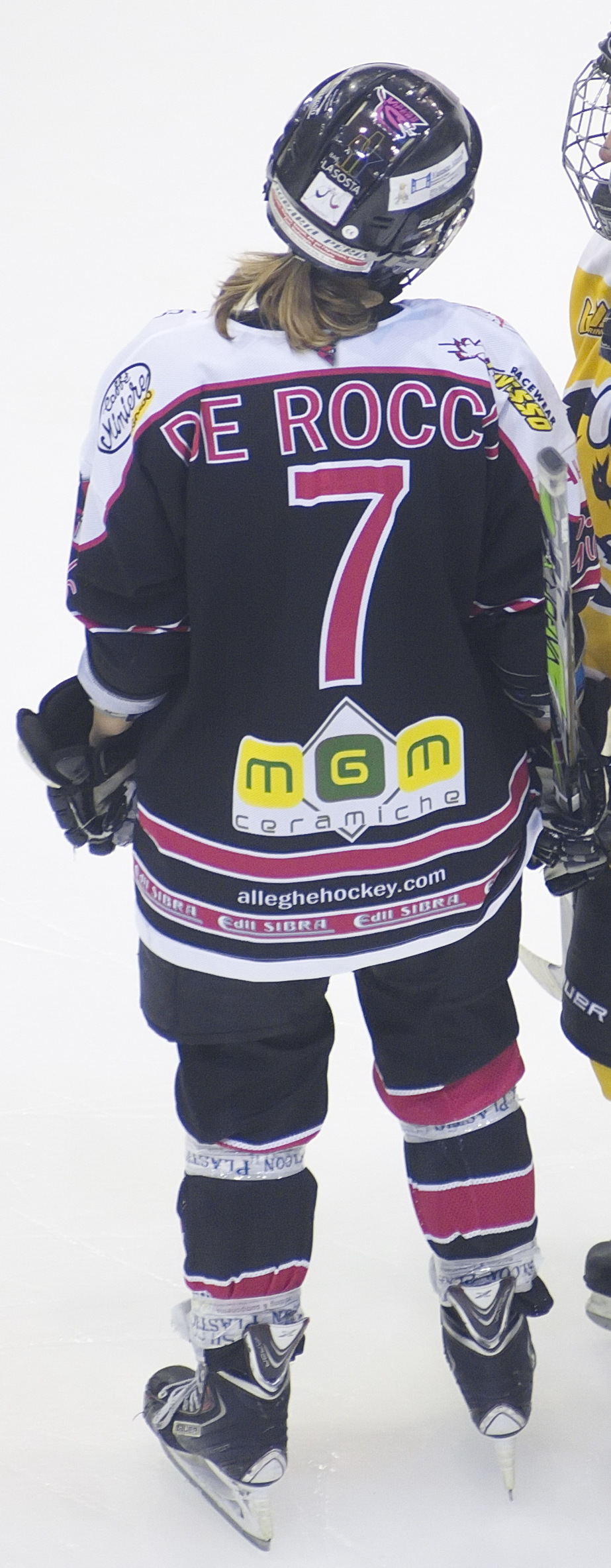
- De Rocco with the Alleghe Hockey Girls during the 2014–15 Serie A season
- Born: 3 January 1986 (age 40) Belluno, Italy
- Height: 163 cm (5 ft 4 in)
- Position: Defense
- Shot: Left
- IHLW team Former teams: HC Dobbiaco Femminile: HC Agordo; HC Feltreghiaccio Femminile; Alleghe Hockey Girls; EV Bozen Eagles
- National team: Italy
- Playing career: 2000–2025

Linda De Rocco (born 3 January 1986) is an Italian ice hockey player. She competed in the women's tournament at the 2006 Winter Olympics.
