= Anna De la Forest =

Italian ice hockey player

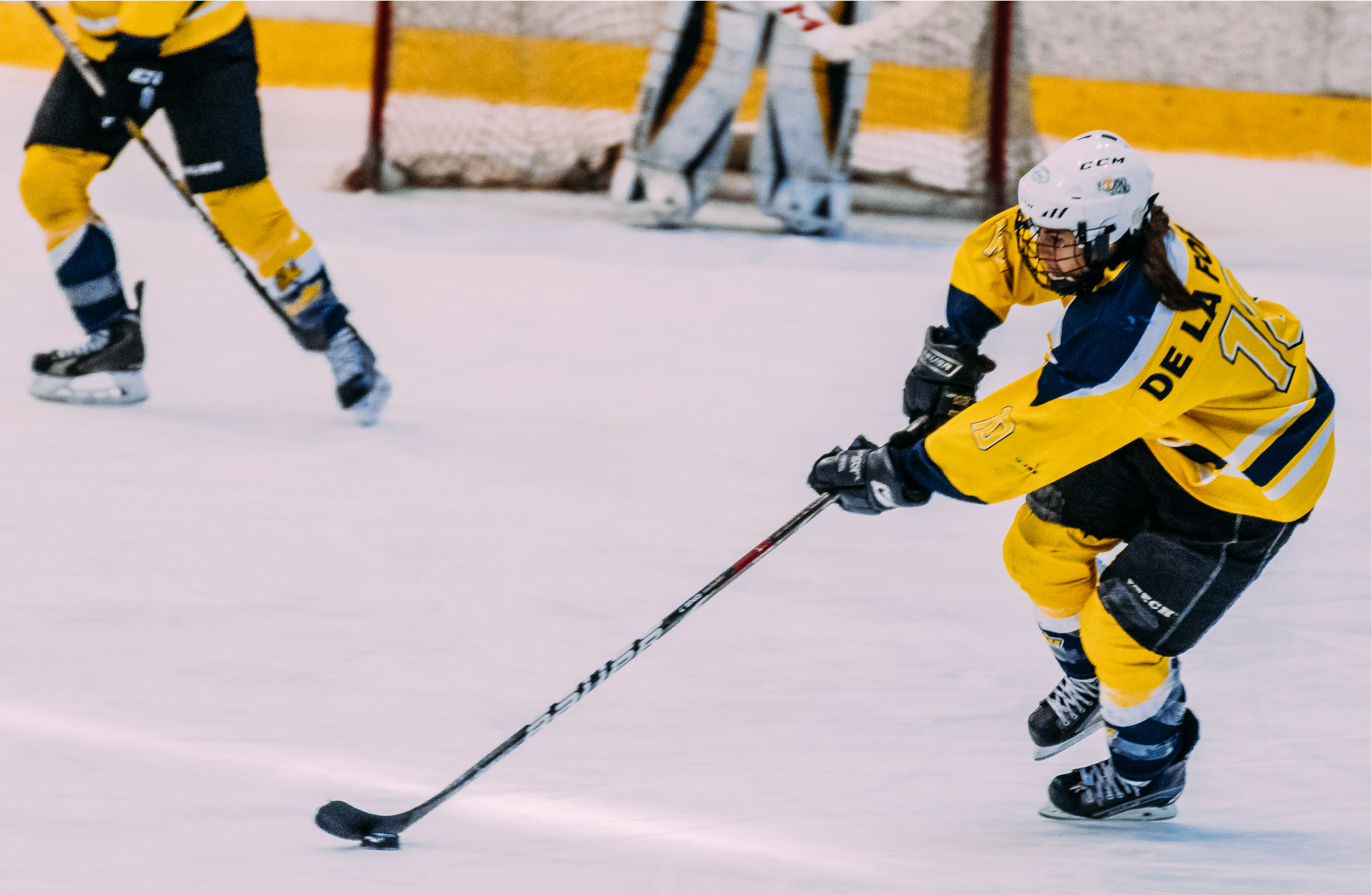
- SAF - Bulls-Eagles
- Born: 24 June 1988 (age 38) Turin, Italy
- Height: 163 cm (5 ft 4 in)
- Weight: 47 kg (104 lb; 7 st 6 lb)
- Position: Forward
- Shoots: Left
- IHLW team Former teams: Piemont Rebelles: AHC Lakers Neumarkt; Torino Bulls; EV Bozen Eagles; Real Torino; All Stars Piemonte
- National team: Italy
- Playing career: 2002–present

Anna De la Forest de Divonne (born 24 June 1988) is an Italian ice hockey forward and member of the Italian national ice hockey team, currently playing in the Italian Hockey League Women (IHLW) with the Piemont Rebelles. She represented Italy in the women's ice hockey tournament at the 2006 Winter Olympics.

A mainstay of the Italian national team for nearly two decades, De la Forest has participated in thirteen IIHF Women's World Championship tournaments – the Division II tournaments in 2004, 2005, 2007, 2008, 2009, and 2011; the Division II Group A tournaments in 2013 and 2014; the Division I Group B tournaments in 2012, 2015, 2016, and 2018; and the Division I Group A tournament in 2019.

== Personal life ==
De la Forest studied law at the University of Turin and works as a lawyer at a private firm in Piedmont, Italy.
