= Laura Kluge =

German ice hockey player (born 1996)

- Kluge with the Boston Fleet in 2026
- Born: 6 November 1996 (age 30) Berlin, Germany
- Height: 1.78 m (5 ft 10 in)
- Weight: 55 kg (121 lb; 8 st 9 lb)
- Position: Forward
- Shoots: Left
- PWHL team Former teams: Boston Fleet: Toronto Sceptres; OSC Berlin; Linköping HC; ECDC Memmingen
- National team: Germany
- Playing career: 2010–present

Laura Kluge (born 6 November 1996) is a German professional ice hockey player for the Boston Fleet of the Professional Women's Hockey League (PWHL) and a member of the German national team. She previously played for the Toronto Sceptres of the PWHL.

== Playing career ==
=== PWHL ===
After going undrafted in the 2024 PWHL draft, Kluge was invited to the Toronto Sceptres' training camp. She was not offered a contract following the camp, due in part to a commitment to the German military. Kluge signed a one-year contract with the Sceptres on 10 February 2025, following an injury to Sarah Nurse. On 20 June 2025, she signed a one-year contract with the Boston Fleet. On 20 June 2026, she signed a two-year contract extension with the Fleet.

== International play ==
Kluge participated at the 2015 IIHF Women's World Championship.

In Germany's first win at the 2026 Olympics, Kluge scored a goal and added three assists in a 5–2 win versus Japan on February 7.

On February 9, 2026, Germany's third game at the Olympics, Kluge scored a goal versus France, contributing in a 2–1 overtime win.
