= Gwendoline Gendarme =

French ice hockey player

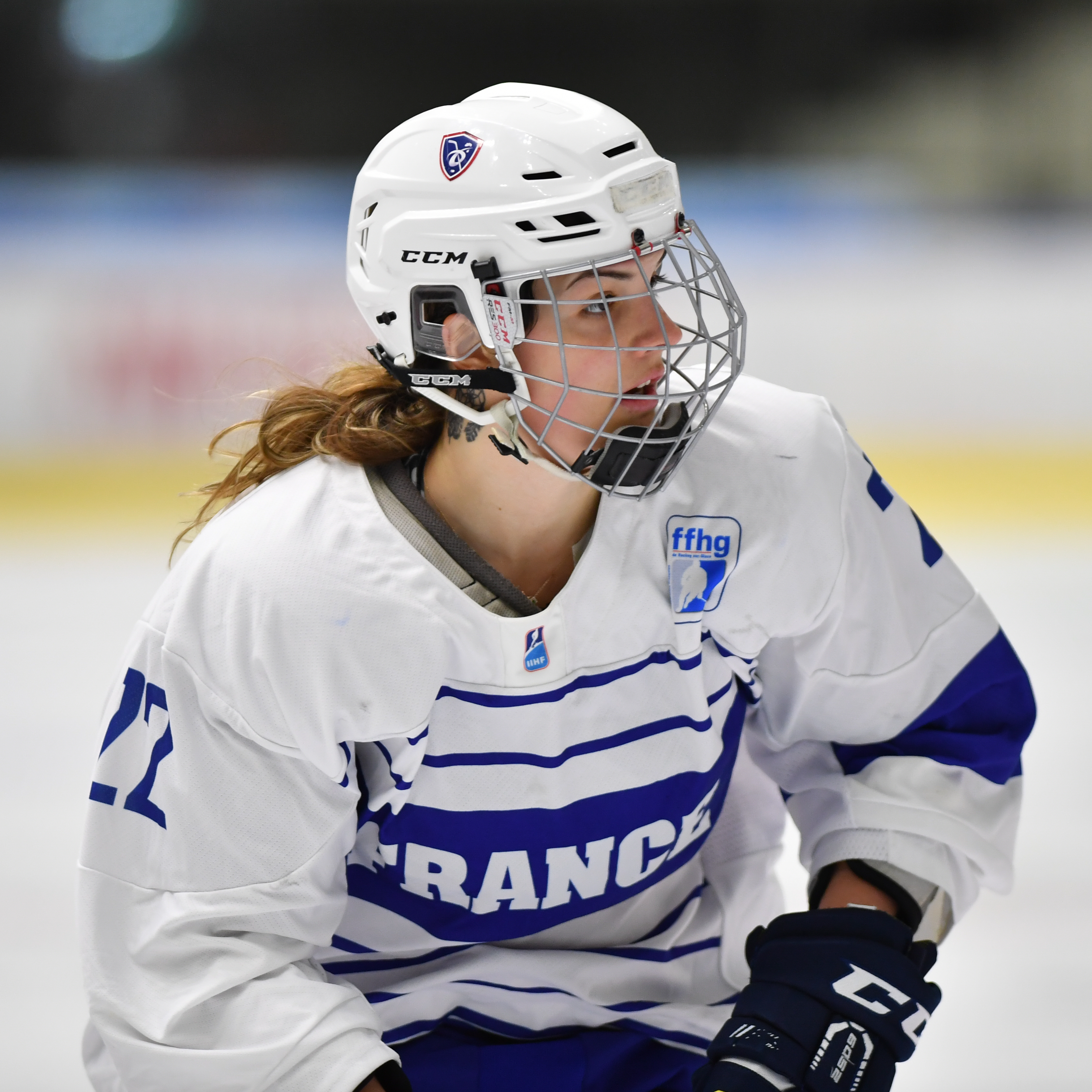
- Born: 18 March 1991 (age 34); Rosny-sous-Bois, France
- Height: 1.70 m (5 ft 7 in)
- Weight: 72 kg (159 lb; 11 st 5 lb)
- Position: Defence
- Shoots: Right
- SWHL team Former teams: Djurgårdens IF Hockey; Pôle France Féminin; HC Université Neuchâtel
- National team: France
- Playing career: 2011–present

Gwendoline Gendarme (born 18 March 1991) is a French ice hockey player for Djurgårdens IF Hockey and the French national team.

She represented France at the 2019 IIHF Women's World Championship.
