= Madelen Haug Hansen =

Norwegian ice hockey forward

- Born: 9 August 1993 (age 32) Halden, Østfold, Norway
- Height: 163 cm (5 ft 4 in)
- Weight: 64 kg (141 lb; 10 st 1 lb)
- Position: Wing
- Shoots: Left
- SDHL team Former teams: Linköping HC; Sparta Warriors; Modo Hockey
- National team: Norway
- Playing career: 2009–present

Madelen Haug Hansen (born 9 August 1993) is a Norwegian ice hockey forward, currently serving as captain of Linköping HC Dam in the Swedish Women's Hockey League (SDHL) and the Norwegian national team. She has received the Gullpucken as Norwegian player of the year twice, in 2015 and 2019. She has won three silver medals and two bronze medals in the IIHF World Championship - Division I, as well as two SDHL Swedish Championships.

She scored the first goal of the 2016-17 SDHL season, the first season in which the league was organised as the SDHL.
