= Caroline Lambert =

French ice hockey player

- Born: 1 April 1995 (age 31) Villard-de-Lans, France
- Height: 1.65 m (5 ft 5 in)
- Weight: 69 kg (152 lb; 10 st 12 lb)
- Position: Goaltender
- Catches: Left
- SWHL A team SWHL B team Former teams: HT Thurgau; EC Wil; SC Weinfelden; ŽHK Poprad; Timrå IK
- National team: France
- Playing career: 2013–present

Caroline Lambert (born 1 April 1995) is a French ice hockey player and member of the French national team, currently playing with HT Thurgau in the Women's League (SWHL A) and with EC Wil in the Swiss Women's Hockey League B (SWHL B).

She represented France at the 2019 IIHF Women's World Championship.
