= Jade Vix =

French ice hockey player

- Born: 3 May 1997 (age 27); Strasbourg, France
- Height: 1.74 m (5 ft 9 in)
- Weight: 67 kg (148 lb; 10 st 8 lb)
- Position: Forward
- Shoots: Right
- Played for: Montreal Carabins
- National team: France
- Playing career: 2014–present

Jade Vix (born 3 May 1997) is a French ice hockey player, most recently of the Montreal Carabins women's ice hockey program during the 2018–19 U Sports women's ice hockey season.

She represented France at the 2019 IIHF Women's World Championship.
