= Manuela Anwander =

German ice hockey player (born 1992)

- Born: January 9, 1992 (age 33); Gräfelfing, Germany
- Height: 5 ft 5 in (165 cm)
- Weight: 148 lb (67 kg; 10 st 8 lb)
- Position: Forward
- Shoots: Right
- DFEL team Former teams: Memmingen Indians; ESC Planegg; ERC Ingolstadt
- National team: Germany
- Playing career: 2007–present

Manuela Anwander (born January 9, 1992) is a German ice hockey forward.

== International career ==
Anwander was selected for the Germany women's national ice hockey team in the 2014 Winter Olympics. She played in all five games, scoring one goal and adding one assists.

Anwander also played for Germany in the qualifying event for the 2014 Winter Olympics. She played in all three games, scoring one goal and adding two assists. She also appeared in the 2010 qualifying

As of 2014, Anwander has also appeared for Germany at four IIHF Women's World Championships. Her first appearance came in 2008.

Anwander made three appearances for the Germany women's national under-18 ice hockey team, at the IIHF World Women's U18 Championships, with the first in 2008.

== Career statistics ==
=== International career ===
Through 2013–14 season

Year	Team	Event	GP	G	A	Pts	PIM
2008	Germany U18	U18	5	4	3	7	0
2008	Germany	WW	4	2	0	2	0
2010	Germany	OlyQ	3	0	1	1	2
2011	Germany	WW DI	4	0	1	1	2
2012	Germany	WW	5	2	0	2	2
2014	Germany	OlyQ	3	1	2	3	2
2013	Germany	WW	5	1	3	4	0
2014	Germany	Oly	5	1	1	2	2
