= Yvonne Rothemund =

German ice hockey player

- Born: 23 September 1992 (age 33) Kulmbach, Germany
- Height: 1.80 m (5 ft 11 in)
- Weight: 79 kg (174 lb; 12 st 6 lb)
- Position: Defence
- Shoots: Left
- DFEL team Former teams: ESC Planegg; ECDC Memmingen
- National team: Germany
- Playing career: 2008–present

Yvonne Rothemund (born 23 September 1992) is a German ice hockey player for ESC Planegg and the German national team.

She participated at the 2015 IIHF Women's World Championship. She also participated at the 2016, 2017, 2019 and 2021 IIHF Women‘s World Championships.
