= Silvia Carignano =

Italian ice hockey player

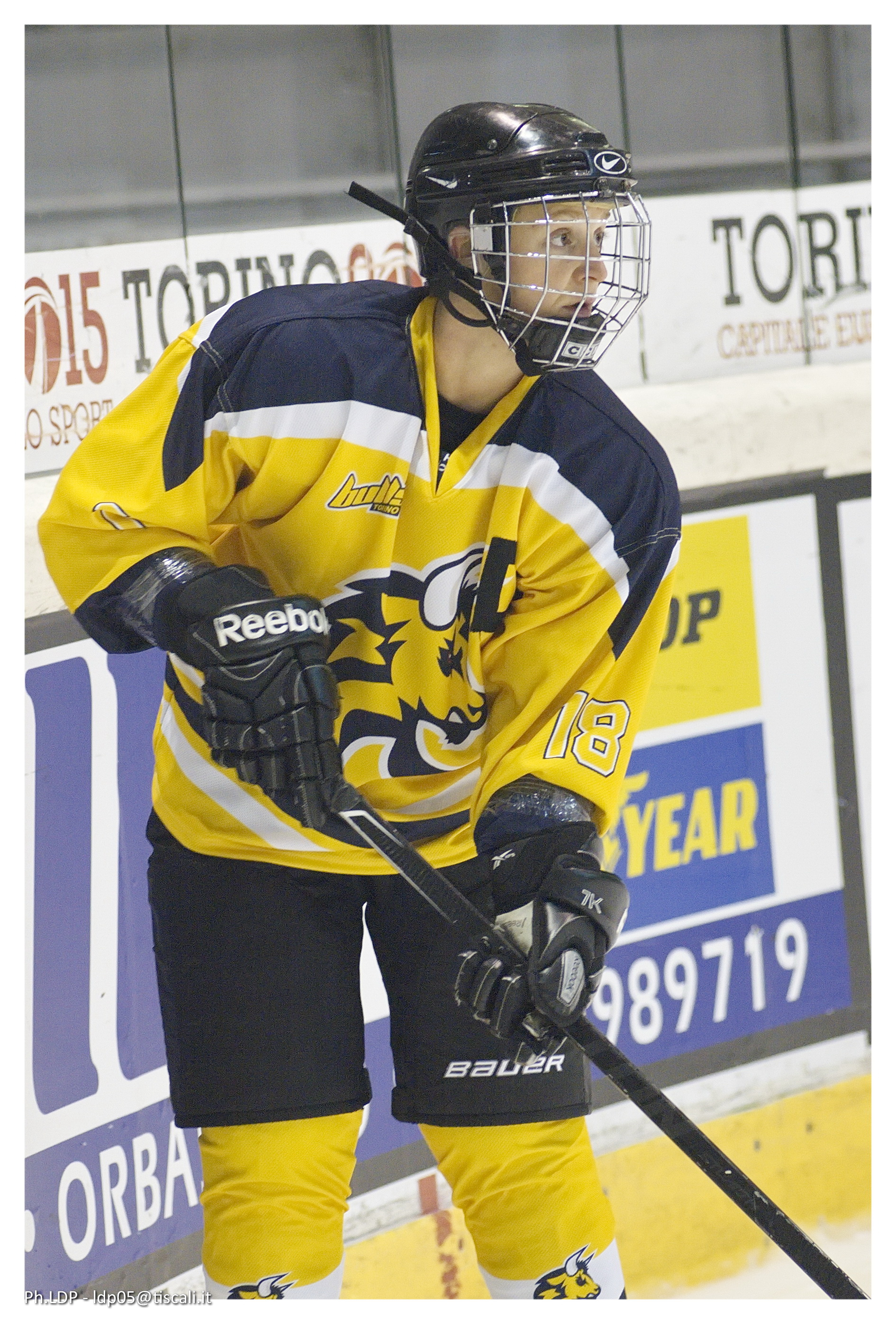
- Carignano in 2014
- Born: 11 August 1987 (age 37); Pinerolo, Italy
- Height: 163 cm (5 ft 4 in)
- Weight: 55 kg (121 lb; 8 st 9 lb)
- Position: Forward
- Shot: left
- Played for: Serie A/IHLW: All Stars Piemonte; Real Torino; Torino Bulls; EWHL: EV Bozen Eagles; DEBL2: HC Lakers
- National team: Italy
- Playing career: 2002–2019

Silvia "Sissi" Carignano (born 11 August 1987) is an Italian former ice hockey player. She competed in the women's tournament at the 2006 Winter Olympics.
