= Valentina Bettarini =

Italian ice hockey player

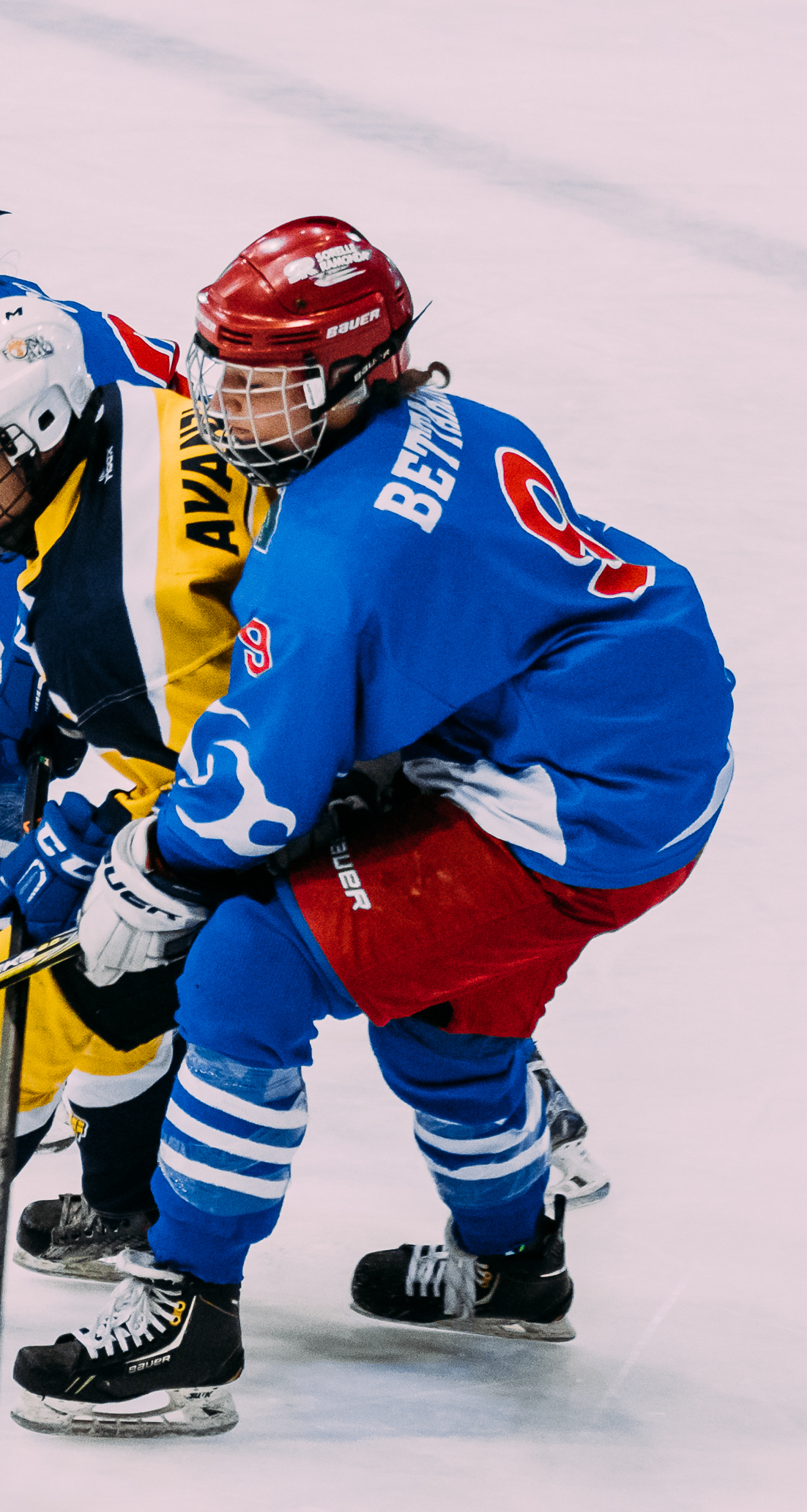
- Born: 29 June 1990 (age 36) Bolzano, Italy
- Height: 1.72 m (5 ft 8 in)
- Weight: 62 kg (137 lb; 9 st 11 lb)
- Position: Defense
- Shoots: Left
- EWHL/IHLW team Former teams: EVB Eagles Südtirol; EHV Sabres; ESC Planegg; SC Riessersee; HC Eagles Bolzano
- National team: Italy
- Playing career: 2004–present

Valentina Bettarini (born 29 June 1990) is an Italian ice hockey player and a member of the Italian national ice hockey team. She currently plays with the EVB Eagles Südtirol in both the European Women's Hockey League (EWHL) and the Italian Hockey League Women (IHLW). She represented Italy in the women's ice hockey tournament at the 2006 Winter Olympics in Turin. At 15 years and 228 days, she was the youngest woman to participate in the tournament.

Bettarini has been an EWHL champion five times, winning in 2011, 2012, 2015, and 2016 with the EHV Sabres, and in 2017 with the EVB Eagles. With the EVB Eagles, she also won the Italian Championship four times, in 2017, 2018, 2021, and 2022.

== Career stats ==
=== International ===
Year	Team	Event	Result	GP	G	A	Pts	PIM
2005	Italy	WW D2	2nd	5	0	0	0	2
2006	Italy	OG	8th	5	0	1	1	4
2007	Italy	WW D2	2nd	5	0	0	0	8
2008	Italy	WW D2	4th	5	1	3	4	12
2009	Italy	WW D2	4th	5	0	0	0	2
2009	Italy	OGQ	DNQ	4	4	4	8	14
2011	Italy	WW D2	4th	4	0	1	1	8
2012	Italy	WW D1B	6th	5	0	1	1	26
2013	Italy	WW D2A	2nd	5	0	1	1	2
2013	Italy	OGQ	DNQ	3	0	1	1	4
2014	Italy	WW D2A	1st	5	1	0	1	4
2015	Italy	WW D1B	5th	5	1	4	5	4
2016	Italy	WW D1B	4th	5	1	3	4	6
2021	Italy	OGQ	DNQ	6	0	0	0	0
Totals				54	4	14	18	78

Olympic qualification scoring not included in career totals
