= Lara Escudero =

French ice hockey player

- Born: 6 June 1993 (age 32); Valenciennes, Hauts-de-France, France
- Height: 1.64 m (5 ft 5 in)
- Weight: 64 kg (141 lb; 10 st 1 lb)
- Position: Forward
- Shoots: Right
- EWHL team Former teams: KMH Budapest: TPS Turku; Hockey Féminin 74; Ladies Team Lugano; EV Bomo Thun; Saint-Laurent Patriotes; Pôle France Féminin; Cergy-Pontoise Jokers
- National team: France
- Playing career: 2011–present

Lara Escudero (born 6 June 1993) is a French ice hockey player and member of the French national team, currently playing with KMH Budapest of the European Women's Hockey League (EWHL).

She represented France at the 2019 IIHF Women's World Championship.
