= Léa Parment =

French ice hockey player

- Born: 16 December 1996 (age 29) Villeneuve-Saint-Georges, France
- Height: 1.66 m (5 ft 5 in)
- Weight: 95 kg (209 lb; 14 st 13 lb)
- Position: Forward
- Shoots: Left
- CFHF team Former teams: Évry-Viry HC; Pôle France Féminin; Timrå IK
- National team: France
- Playing career: 2012–present

Léa Parment (born 16 December 1996) is a French ice hockey player for Évry-Viry HC and was playing for the French national team.

She represented France at the 2019 IIHF Women's World Championship.
