= Denmark at the 2022 Winter Olympics =

- Flag of Denmark
- IOC code: DEN
- NOC: National Olympic Committee and Sports Confederation of Denmark
- Website: www.dif.dk/en

in Beijing, China 4–20 February 2022
- Competitors: 62 (33 men and 29 women) in 5 sports
- Flag bearers (opening): Madeleine Dupont; Frans Nielsen
- Flag bearer (closing): Stefan Due Schmidt
- Medals: Gold 0 Silver 0 Bronze 0 Total 0

Winter Olympics appearances (overview)
- 1948; 1952; 1956; 1960; 1964; 1968; 1972–1984; 1988; 1992; 1994; 1998; 2002; 2006; 2010; 2014; 2018; 2022; 2026

Denmark competed at the 2022 Winter Olympics in Beijing, China, from 4 to 20 February 2022.

With the debut of both the men's and women's ice hockey teams, this was the largest delegation Denmark ever sent to the Winter Games, and more than 3 times the size of the previous largest delegation, which was 18 in 2010.

On 20 January 2022, it was announced the Danish team would consist of 62 athletes (33 men and 29 women) competing in five sports. Curler Madeleine Dupont and hockey player Frans Nielsen were also named as the Danish flagbearers during the opening ceremony. Meanwhile speed skater Stefan Due Schmidt was the flagbearer during the closing ceremony.

Their best placement was 7th, in the men's ice hockey tournament.

== Competitors ==
The following is the list of number of competitors participating at the Games per sport/discipline.

Sport	Men	Women	Total
Alpine skiing	1	0	1
Biathlon	0	1	1
Curling	5	5	10
Ice hockey	25	23	48
Speed skating	2	0	2
Total	33	29	62

== Alpine skiing ==
By meeting the basic qualification standards Denmark qualified one male and one female alpine skier, but declined the female quota.

Athlete	Event	Run 1		Run 2		Total	
Athlete	Event	Time	Rank	Time	Rank	Time	Rank
Casper Dyrbye Næsted	Men's slalom	1:01.38	38	55.89	31	1:57.27	30

== Biathlon ==
Based on the IBU Qualifying Points list Denmark qualified one athlete – Ukaleq Slettemark. Slettemark competes for Greenland (a constituent country in the Kingdom of Denmark) in the Biathlon World Cup, but as they don't have a National Olympic Committee, Greenlandic athletes compete at the Olympics for Denmark.

Athlete	Event	Time	Misses	Rank
Ukaleq Slettemark	Women's sprint	23:54.6	0 (0+0)	65
Ukaleq Slettemark	Women's individual	50:27.4	0 (0+0+0+0)	53

== Curling ==
Summary

Team	Event	Group stage										Semifinal	Final / BM	
Team	Event	Opposition Score	Opposition Score	Opposition Score	Opposition Score	Opposition Score	Opposition Score	Opposition Score	Opposition Score	Opposition Score	Rank	Opposition Score	Opposition Score	Rank
Mikkel Krause; Mads Nørgård; Henrik Holtermann; Kasper Wiksten; Tobias Thune	Men's tournament	CAN; L 5–10	CHN; L 4–5	ROC; L 2–10	SUI; L 6–8	GBR; L 2–8	NOR; W 6–5	SWE; L 3–8	ITA; L 3–10	USA; L 5–7	10	did not advance		
Madeleine Dupont; Mathilde Halse; Denise Dupont; My Larsen; Jasmin Lander	Women's tournament	CHN; W 7–6	USA; L 5–7	JPN; L 7–8	SUI; L 5–8	GBR; L 2–7	ROC; W 10–5	SWE; L 3–9	KOR; L 7–8	CAN; L 4–10	9	did not advance		

=== Men's tournament ===
Denmark qualified their men's team (five athletes), by finishing in third in the 2021 Olympic Qualification Event.

Final Round Robin Standings
Team	Skip	Pld	W	L	W–L	PF	PA	EW	EL	BE	SE	S%	DSC	Qualification
Great Britain	Bruce Mouat	9	8	1	–	63	44	39	31	5	10	88.0%	18.81	Playoffs
Sweden	Niklas Edin	9	7	2	–	64	44	43	30	10	11	85.7%	14.02	Playoffs
Canada	Brad Gushue	9	5	4	1–0	58	50	34	38	7	7	84.4%	26.49	Playoffs
United States	John Shuster	9	5	4	0–1	56	61	35	41	4	5	83.0%	32.29	Playoffs
China	Ma Xiuyue	9	4	5	2–1; 1–0	59	62	39	36	6	4	85.4%	23.55	
Norway	Steffen Walstad	9	4	5	2–1; 0–1	58	53	40	36	0	11	84.4%	20.96	
Switzerland	Peter de Cruz	9	4	5	1–2; 1–0	51	54	33	38	13	3	84.5%	15.74	
ROC	Sergey Glukhov	9	4	5	1–2; 0–1	58	58	33	38	6	6	81.2%	33.72	
Italy	Joël Retornaz	9	3	6	–	59	65	36	35	3	8	81.7%	30.76	
Denmark	Mikkel Krause	9	1	8	–	36	71	30	39	3	2	78.1%	32.84	

Round robin

Denmark had a bye in draws 2, 6 and 10.

Draw 1

Wednesday, 9 February, 20:05

Sheet A	1	2	3	4	5	6	7	8	9	10	Final
Denmark (Krause) 🔨	0	2	0	2	0	0	1	0	X	X	5
Canada (Gushue)	1	0	3	0	1	2	0	3	X	X	10

Draw 3

Friday, 11 February, 9:05

Sheet D	1	2	3	4	5	6	7	8	9	10	Final
Denmark (Krause)	0	1	0	1	0	1	0	1	0	0	4
China (Ma) 🔨	1	0	1	0	2	0	1	0	0	0	5

Draw 4

Friday, 11 February, 20:05

Sheet B	1	2	3	4	5	6	7	8	9	10	Final
ROC (Glukhov) 🔨	0	2	0	2	6	0	X	X	X	X	10
Denmark (Krause)	0	0	1	0	0	1	X	X	X	X	2

Draw 5

Saturday, 12 February, 14:05

Sheet C	1	2	3	4	5	6	7	8	9	10	Final
Denmark (Krause)	0	1	0	2	0	1	0	0	2	0	6
Switzerland (de Cruz) 🔨	2	0	2	0	2	0	0	1	0	1	8

Draw 7

Sunday, 13 February, 20:05

Sheet A	1	2	3	4	5	6	7	8	9	10	Final
Great Britain (Mouat) 🔨	2	0	2	0	0	1	0	3	X	X	8
Denmark (Krause)	0	0	0	0	1	0	1	0	X	X	2

Draw 8

Monday, 14 February, 14:05

Sheet B	1	2	3	4	5	6	7	8	9	10	11	Final
Denmark (Krause) 🔨	1	0	0	1	1	0	1	0	1	0	1	6
Norway (Walstad)	0	1	0	0	0	2	0	1	0	1	0	5

Draw 9

Tuesday, 15 February, 9:05

Sheet D	1	2	3	4	5	6	7	8	9	10	Final
Sweden (Edin) 🔨	0	1	0	1	0	3	0	2	1	X	8
Denmark (Krause)	0	0	1	0	1	0	1	0	0	X	3

Draw 11

Wednesday, 16 February, 14:05

Sheet C	1	2	3	4	5	6	7	8	9	10	Final
Italy (Retornaz)	0	2	2	1	0	4	1	X	X	X	10
Denmark (Krause) 🔨	2	0	0	0	1	0	0	X	X	X	3

Draw 12

Thursday, 17 February, 9:05

Sheet A	1	2	3	4	5	6	7	8	9	10	Final
Denmark (Krause) 🔨	1	1	0	0	1	0	0	0	2	X	5
United States (Shuster)	0	0	2	3	0	0	1	1	0	X	7

=== Women's tournament ===
Denmark qualified their women's team (five athletes), by finishing in the top six teams in the 2021 World Women's Curling Championship.

Final Round Robin Standings
Team	Skip	Pld	W	L	W–L	PF	PA	EW	EL	BE	SE	S%	DSC	Qualification
Switzerland	Silvana Tirinzoni	9	8	1	–	67	46	44	36	4	12	81.6%	19.14	Playoffs
Sweden	Anna Hasselborg	9	7	2	–	64	49	39	35	6	12	82.0%	25.02	Playoffs
Great Britain	Eve Muirhead	9	5	4	1–1	63	47	39	33	4	9	80.6%	35.27	Playoffs
Japan	Satsuki Fujisawa	9	5	4	1–1	64	62	40	36	2	13	82.3%	36.00	Playoffs
Canada	Jennifer Jones	9	5	4	1–1	71	59	42	41	1	14	80.4%	45.44	
United States	Tabitha Peterson	9	4	5	2–0	60	64	40	39	2	12	79.5%	33.87	
China	Han Yu	9	4	5	1–1	56	67	38	41	3	10	79.6%	30.06	
South Korea	Kim Eun-jung	9	4	5	0–2	62	66	40	42	3	10	80.8%	27.79	
Denmark	Madeleine Dupont	9	2	7	–	50	68	33	41	7	0	77.2%	23.36	
ROC	Alina Kovaleva	9	1	8	–	50	79	34	45	2	7	78.9%	29.34	

Round robin

Denmark had a bye in draws 3, 7 and 10.

Draw 1

Thursday, 10 February, 9:05

Sheet B	1	2	3	4	5	6	7	8	9	10	Final
Denmark (Dupont) 🔨	0	2	0	1	0	0	3	0	0	1	7
China (Han)	0	0	1	0	2	0	0	1	2	0	6

Draw 2

Thursday, 10 February, 20:05

Sheet C	1	2	3	4	5	6	7	8	9	10	Final
United States (Peterson)	1	0	2	0	0	1	0	2	0	1	7
Denmark (Dupont) 🔨	0	1	0	2	0	0	1	0	1	0	5

Draw 4

Saturday, 12 February, 9:05

Sheet D	1	2	3	4	5	6	7	8	9	10	Final
Japan (Fujisawa)	0	1	0	2	0	1	0	1	0	3	8
Denmark (Dupont) 🔨	0	0	2	0	2	0	2	0	1	0	7

Draw 5

Saturday, 12 February, 20:05

Sheet B	1	2	3	4	5	6	7	8	9	10	Final
Denmark (Dupont)	0	0	1	0	0	0	3	0	1	0	5
Switzerland (Tirinzoni) 🔨	1	0	0	1	0	1	0	3	0	2	8

Draw 6

Sunday, 13 February, 14:05

Sheet A	1	2	3	4	5	6	7	8	9	10	Final
Denmark (Dupont)	0	0	1	0	0	1	0	0	0	X	2
Great Britain (Muirhead) 🔨	2	0	0	0	1	0	0	1	3	X	7

Draw 8

Monday, 14 February, 20:05

Sheet D	1	2	3	4	5	6	7	8	9	10	Final
Denmark (Dupont) 🔨	2	0	0	1	0	1	0	3	0	3	10
ROC (Kovaleva)	0	2	0	0	1	0	1	0	1	0	5

Draw 9

Tuesday, 15 February, 14:05

Sheet B	1	2	3	4	5	6	7	8	9	10	Final
Sweden (Hasselborg)	0	2	3	0	3	0	1	X	X	X	9
Denmark (Dupont) 🔨	1	0	0	1	0	1	0	X	X	X	3

Draw 11

Wednesday, 16 February, 20:05

Sheet A	1	2	3	4	5	6	7	8	9	10	Final
South Korea (Kim)	0	2	0	1	0	2	0	1	0	2	8
Denmark (Dupont) 🔨	1	0	1	0	3	0	1	0	1	0	7

Draw 12

Thursday, 17 February, 14:05

Sheet C	1	2	3	4	5	6	7	8	9	10	Final
Denmark (Dupont)	0	1	0	2	0	0	0	1	X	X	4
Canada (Jones) 🔨	1	0	2	0	2	3	2	0	X	X	10

== Ice hockey ==
Denmark qualified 25 male competitors to the ice hockey tournament.

Summary

Key:

- OT – Overtime
- GWS – Match decided by penalty-shootout

Team	Event	Group stage					Qualification playoff	Quarterfinal	Semifinal	Final / BM	
Team	Event	Opposition Score	Opposition Score	Opposition Score	Opposition Score	Rank	Opposition Score	Opposition Score	Opposition Score	Opposition Score	Rank
Denmark men's	Men's tournament	Czech Republic; W 2–1	ROC; L 0–2	Switzerland; W 5–3	—N/a	2 Q	Latvia; W 3–2	ROC; L 1–3	did not advance		7
Denmark women's	Women's tournament	China; L 1–3	Japan; L 2–6	Czech Republic; W 3–2	Sweden; L 1–3	5	—N/a	did not advance			10

=== Men's tournament ===
Denmark men's national ice hockey team qualified by winning the final qualification tournament.

Team roster

The roster was announced on 18 January 2022.

Head coach: Heinz Ehlers

No.	Pos.	Name	Height	Weight	Birthdate	Team
1	G	Frederik Dichow	1.95 m (6 ft 5 in)	87 kg (192 lb)	1 March 2001 (aged 20)	(Sweden) Kristianstads IK
2	D	Phillip Bruggisser	1.83 m (6 ft 0 in)	85 kg (187 lb)	7 August 1991 (aged 30)	(Germany) Fischtown Pinguins
9	F	Frederik Storm	1.80 m (5 ft 11 in)	86 kg (190 lb)	20 February 1989 (aged 32)	(Germany) ERC Ingolstadt
15	D	Matias Lassen	1.82 m (6 ft 0 in)	82 kg (181 lb)	15 March 1996 (aged 25)	(Sweden) Malmö Redhawks
16	F	Matthias Asperup	1.82 m (6 ft 0 in)	84 kg (185 lb)	3 March 1995 (aged 26)	(Denmark) Herlev Eagles
17	F	Nicklas Jensen	1.91 m (6 ft 3 in)	98 kg (216 lb)	6 March 1993 (aged 28)	(Finland) Jokerit
22	D	Markus Lauridsen	1.86 m (6 ft 1 in)	87 kg (192 lb)	28 February 1991 (aged 30)	(Sweden) Malmö Redhawks
25	D	Oliver Lauridsen	1.97 m (6 ft 6 in)	93 kg (205 lb)	24 March 1989 (aged 32)	(Sweden) Malmö Redhawks
28	D	Emil Kristensen	1.84 m (6 ft 0 in)	81 kg (179 lb)	20 September 1992 (aged 29)	(Italy) HC Pustertal Wölfe
29	F	Morten Madsen	1.90 m (6 ft 3 in)	95 kg (209 lb)	16 January 1987 (aged 35)	(Sweden) Timrå IK
31	G	Patrick Galbraith	1.83 m (6 ft 0 in)	81 kg (179 lb)	11 March 1986 (aged 35)	(Denmark) SønderjyskE Ishockey
32	G	Sebastian Dahm	1.82 m (6 ft 0 in)	83 kg (183 lb)	28 February 1987 (aged 34)	(Austria) EC KAC
33	F	Julian Jakobsen	1.84 m (6 ft 0 in)	87 kg (192 lb)	11 April 1987 (aged 34)	(Denmark) Aalborg Pirates
38	F	Morten Poulsen	1.86 m (6 ft 1 in)	95 kg (209 lb)	9 September 1988 (aged 33)	(Denmark) Herning Blue Fox
40	F	Jesper Jensen	1.83 m (6 ft 0 in)	80 kg (180 lb)	5 February 1987 (aged 35)	(Denmark) Frederikshavn White Hawks
41	D	Jesper Jensen Aabo (A)	1.83 m (6 ft 0 in)	93 kg (205 lb)	30 July 1991 (aged 30)	(Germany) Krefeld Pinguine
47	D	Oliver Larsen	1.85 m (6 ft 1 in)	94 kg (207 lb)	25 December 1998 (aged 23)	(Finland) Mikkelin Jukurit
48	D	Nicholas Jensen	1.89 m (6 ft 2 in)	102 kg (225 lb)	8 April 1989 (aged 32)	(Germany) Eisbären Berlin
50	F	Mathias Bau Hansen	2.00 m (6 ft 7 in)	108 kg (238 lb)	3 July 1993 (aged 28)	(Denmark) Herning Blue Fox
51	F	Frans Nielsen (A)	1.85 m (6 ft 1 in)	82 kg (181 lb)	24 April 1984 (aged 37)	(Germany) Eisbären Berlin
63	F	Patrick Russell	1.85 m (6 ft 1 in)	93 kg (205 lb)	4 January 1993 (aged 29)	(Sweden) Linköping HC
72	F	Nicolai Meyer	1.79 m (5 ft 10 in)	82 kg (181 lb)	21 July 1993 (aged 28)	(Austria) Vienna Capitals
89	F	Mikkel Bødker	1.82 m (6 ft 0 in)	95 kg (209 lb)	16 December 1989 (aged 32)	(Switzerland) HC Lugano
93	F	Peter Regin (C)	1.88 m (6 ft 2 in)	93 kg (205 lb)	16 April 1986 (aged 35)	(Switzerland) HC Ambrì-Piotta
95	F	Nick Olesen	1.85 m (6 ft 1 in)	84 kg (185 lb)	14 November 1995 (aged 26)	(Sweden) Brynäs IF

Group play

Pos	Team	Pld	W	OTW	OTL	L	GF	GA	GD	Pts	Qualification
1	ROC	3	2	0	1	0	8	6	+2	7	Quarterfinals
2	Denmark	3	2	0	0	1	7	6	+1	6	Playoffs
3	Czech Republic	3	0	2	0	1	9	8	+1	4	Playoffs
4	Switzerland	3	0	0	1	2	4	8	−4	1	Playoffs

Source: IIHF

February 9, 2022; 21:10 v	Czech Republic	1–2 (0–2, 1–0, 0–0)	Denmark	Beijing National Indoor Stadium, Beijing; Attendance: 891

Game reference

Šimon Hrubec
Goalies
Sebastian Dahm
Referees:
(Canada) Oliver Gouin
(Switzerland) Michael Tscherrig
Linesmen:
(Sweden) Ludvig Lundgren
(Finland) Lauri Nikulainen

	0–1	11:21 – Lauridsen
	0–2	17:23 – Nielsen (PS)
Červenka (Kovář) – 23:45	1–2

2 min
Penalties
6 min
40
Shots
17

February 11, 2022; 12:10 v	Denmark	0–2 (0–0, 0–1, 0–1)	ROC	Beijing National Indoor Stadium, Beijing; Attendance: 907

Game reference
Frederik Dichow	Goalies	Ivan Fedotov	Referees: (Canada) Michael Campbell (Czech Republic) Martin Fraňo; Linesmen: (United States) William Hancock (Sweden) Andreas Malmqvist
0–1 / 28:18 – Karnaukhov (Slepyshev, Voronkov); 0–2 / 59:54 – Semyonov (ENG)			Referees: (Canada) Michael Campbell (Czech Republic) Martin Fraňo; Linesmen: (United States) William Hancock (Sweden) Andreas Malmqvist
10 min	Penalties	2 min	Referees: (Canada) Michael Campbell (Czech Republic) Martin Fraňo; Linesmen: (United States) William Hancock (Sweden) Andreas Malmqvist
16	Shots	33	Referees: (Canada) Michael Campbell (Czech Republic) Martin Fraňo; Linesmen: (United States) William Hancock (Sweden) Andreas Malmqvist

February 12, 2022; 21:10 v	Switzerland	3–5 (1–0, 0–3, 2–2)	Denmark	Wukesong Arena, Beijing; Attendance: 620

Game reference

Reto Berra
Goalies
Sebastian Dahm
Referees:
(Russia) Roman Gofman
(Finland) Kristian Vikman
Linesmen:
(Sweden) Andreas Malmqvist
(Russia) Nikita Shalagin

Corvi (Weber, Thürkauf) – 15:59	1–0
	1–1	20:46 – Regin (Storm, Nick. Jensen) (PP)
	1–2	21:07 – Storm (Nich. Jensen, Russell)
	1–3	33:12 – Bødker (Russell, Lauridsen)
	1–4	41:55 – Meyer (Nich. Jensen, Jakobsen)
Loeffel (Untersander, Corvi) (PP) – 44:53	2–4
Herzog (Corvi, Untersander) (EA) – 57:37	3–4
	3–5	59:01 – Storm (Russell) (ENG)

14 min
Penalties
6 min
31
Shots
30

Playoffs

February 15, 2022; 12:10 v	Denmark	3–2 (1–1, 1–1, 1–0)	Latvia	Wukesong Arena, Beijing; Attendance: 726

Game reference

Sebastian Dahm
Goalies
Jānis Kalniņš
Ivars Punnenovs
Referees:
(United States) Andrew Bruggema
(Germany) André Schrader
Linesmen:
(Canada) Dustin McCrank
(Russia) Dmitry Shishlo

Poulsen (Jakobsen, Lassen) – 12:02	1–0
	1–1	16:23 – Dārziņš (Krastenbergs, Cibuļskis)
	1–2	22:33 – Dārzinš (Balinskis, Krastenbergs) (PP)
Jakobsen (Meyer) – 36:57	2–2
Lauridsen (Bødker, Nielsen) (PP) – 41:45	3–2

8 min
Penalties
8 min
31
Shots
27

Quarterfinals

February 16, 2022; 14:00 v	ROC	3–1 (1–1, 1–0, 1–0)	Denmark	Wukesong Arena, Beijing; Attendance: 727

Game reference

Ivan Fedotov
Goalies
Sebastian Dahm
Referees:
(Canada) Michael Campbell
(Czech Republic) Martin Fraňo
Linesmen:
(Sweden) Andreas Malmqvist
(Czech Republic) Jiří Ondráček

Shipachyov (Gusev, Yakovlev) – 13:01	1–0
	1–1	22:57 – Nielsen (Bau Hansen, Lauridsen) (PP)
Nesterov (Gusev, Gritsyuk) – 34:36	2–1
Voynov (Shipachyov, Gritsyuk) (PP) – 55:45	3–1

4 min
Penalties
6 min
40
Shots
18

=== Women's tournament ===
Denmark women's national ice hockey team qualified by winning a final qualification tournament.

Team roster

The roster was announced on 10 January 2022.

Head coach: (Sweden) Peter Elander

No.	Pos.	Name	Height	Weight	Birthdate	Team
2	D	Kristine Melberg Hansen	1.69 m (5 ft 7 in)	69 kg (152 lb)	28 December 2000 (aged 21)	(Sweden) IF Malmö
4	F	Silke Lave Glud	1.75 m (5 ft 9 in)	65 kg (143 lb)	3 March 1996 (aged 25)	(Denmark) Rødovre SIK
8	F	Josefine Persson	1.76 m (5 ft 9 in)	69 kg (152 lb)	28 March 1994 (aged 27)	(Sweden) Luleå HF
11	D	Amalie Andersen	1.73 m (5 ft 8 in)	73 kg (161 lb)	6 October 1999 (aged 22)	(United States) Maine Black Bears
13	F	Michele Brix Nielsen	1.69 m (5 ft 7 in)	75 kg (165 lb)	10 July 1996 (aged 25)	(Denmark) Odense IK
14	F	Nicoline Jensen – A	1.65 m (5 ft 5 in)	65 kg (143 lb)	8 November 1992 (aged 29)	(Sweden) HV71
15	D	Amanda Refsgaard	1.75 m (5 ft 9 in)	63 kg (139 lb)	8 March 2001 (aged 20)	(Denmark) Rødovre SIK
17	F	Sofia Skriver	1.65 m (5 ft 5 in)	60 kg (130 lb)	7 June 2003 (aged 18)	(Sweden) Luleå HF
18	F	Maria Holm Peters	1.68 m (5 ft 6 in)	60 kg (130 lb)	16 September 1999 (aged 22)	(Denmark) Odense IK
19	D	Josephine Asperup	1.63 m (5 ft 4 in)	64 kg (141 lb)	21 July 1992 (aged 29)	(Sweden) IF Malmö
21	F	Michelle Weis	1.69 m (5 ft 7 in)	59 kg (130 lb)	10 April 1997 (aged 24)	(United States) Maine Black Bears
22	D	Sofie Skott Dahl	1.72 m (5 ft 8 in)	62 kg (137 lb)	14 June 2002 (aged 19)	(Denmark) Hvidovre IK
23	F	Julie Oksbjerg	1.78 m (5 ft 10 in)	67 kg (148 lb)	2 December 2000 (aged 21)	(Denmark) Odense IK
27	F	Lilli Friis-Hansen	1.63 m (5 ft 4 in)	55 kg (121 lb)	27 January 2000 (aged 22)	(United States) RPI Engineers
30	G	Lisa Jensen	1.65 m (5 ft 5 in)	61 kg (134 lb)	26 February 1997 (aged 24)	(Sweden) IF Malmö
33	G	Emma-Sofie Nordström	1.77 m (5 ft 10 in)	75 kg (165 lb)	5 November 2002 (aged 19)	(Sweden) Linköping HC
50	F	Mia Bau Hansen	1.67 m (5 ft 6 in)	65 kg (143 lb)	22 June 1995 (aged 26)	(Sweden) IF Malmö
63	F	Josefine Jakobsen – C	1.70 m (5 ft 7 in)	72 kg (159 lb)	17 May 1991 (aged 30)	(Sweden) Djurgårdens IF
68	F	Emma Russell	1.68 m (5 ft 6 in)	75 kg (165 lb)	18 August 1995 (aged 26)	(Denmark) Rødovre SIK
72	G	Cassandra Repstock-Romme	1.71 m (5 ft 7 in)	72 kg (159 lb)	26 August 2001 (aged 20)	(Denmark) Hvidovre IK
80	F	Julie Funch Østergaard	1.70 m (5 ft 7 in)	65 kg (143 lb)	6 August 1995 (aged 26)	(Denmark) Hvidovre IK
87	D	Simone Jacquet Thrysøe	1.80 m (5 ft 11 in)	72 kg (159 lb)	23 April 1987 (aged 34)	(Denmark) Aalborg IK
89	D	Malene Frandsen	1.78 m (5 ft 10 in)	68 kg (150 lb)	25 October 1995 (aged 26)	(Sweden) IF Malmö

Group play

Pos	Team	Pld	W	OTW	OTL	L	GF	GA	GD	Pts	Qualification
1	Japan	4	2	1	1	0	13	7	+6	9	Quarterfinals
2	Czech Republic	4	2	0	1	1	10	8	+2	7	Quarterfinals
3	Sweden	4	2	0	0	2	7	8	−1	6	Quarterfinals
4	China (H)	4	1	1	0	2	7	7	0	5	Eliminated
5	Denmark	4	1	0	0	3	7	14	−7	3	Eliminated

Source: IIHF
Rules for classification: Tiebreakers
(H) Host

4 February 2022; 12:10 v	Denmark	1–3 (1–0, 0–1, 0–2)	China	Wukesong Arena, Beijing; Attendance: 580

Game reference

Cassandra Repstock-Romme
Goalies
Kimberly Newell
Referees:
(Russia) Daria Ermak
(United States) Chelsea Rapin
Linesmen:
(Sweden) Veronica Lovensnö
(Finland) Linnea Sainio

Frandsen (N. Jensen, Glud) – 08:06	1–0
	1–1	36:46 – Lum (Yu, Wong)
	1–2	59:10 – Llanes (Lum)
	1–3	59:28 – Lum (ENG)

6 min
Penalties
6 min
23
Shots
32

5 February 2022; 16:40 v	Japan	6–2 (3–0, 2–1, 1–1)	Denmark	Wukesong Arena, Beijing; Attendance: 476

Game reference

Nana Fujimoto
Akane Konishi
Goalies
Cassandra Repstock-Romme
Lisa Jensen
Referees:
(United States) Kelly Cooke
(Sweden) Maria Furberg
Linesmen:
(Canada) Alex Clarke
(United States) Sara Strong

H. Yamashita (Miura, Koike) – 10:46	1–0
H. Toko (Ao. Shiga, A. Toko) – 12:08	2–0
Ukita – 13:50	3–0
A. Toko (H. Toko) – 22:53	4–0
	4–1	29:16 – Bau Hansen (N. Jensen)
Ak. Shiga (Kubo, H. Toko) (PP) – 39:54	5–1
H. Yoneyama (H. Yamashita, Koike) – 48:02	6–1
	6–2	59:55 – Jakobsen (Persson, Weis) (PP)

8 min
Penalties
8 min
42
Shots
20

7 February 2022; 16:40 v	Denmark	3–2 (1–1, 1–1, 1–0)	Czech Republic	Wukesong Arena, Beijing; Attendance: 637

Game reference

Cassandra Repstock-Romme
Goalies
Viktorie Švejdová
Referees:
(Sweden) Maria Furberg
(Canada) Lacey Senuk
Linesmen:
(Canada) Alex Clarke
(United States) Sara Strong

	0–1	05:48 – Tejralová (Křížová)
Jakobsen – 09:14	1–1
	1–2	23:01 – Mrázová (Radová, Vanišová)
Weis – 24:28	2–2
Glud (Jakobsen, N. Jensen) (PP) – 40:49	3–2

12 min
Penalties
8 min
17
Shots
32

8 February 2022; 21:10 v	Sweden	3–1 (1–0, 1–1, 1–0)	Denmark	Wukesong Arena, Beijing; Attendance: 696

Game reference

Emma Söderberg
Goalies
Cassandra Repstock-Romme
Referees:
(Finland) Anniina Nurmi
(United States) Chelsea Rapin
Linesmen:
(Sweden) Anna Hammar
(Finland) Jenni Heikkinen

Nordin (Lundin) – 04:00	1–0
	1–1	34:04 – Oksbjerg (Jakobsen, Friis-Hansen)
Lis. Johansson (Lundin, Waxin) (PP) – 36:00	2–1
Berglund (Ljungblom) (PP, ENG) – 59:43	3–1

14 min
Penalties
10 min
21
Shots
26

== Speed skating ==
Based on the results from the fall World Cups during the 2021–22 ISU Speed Skating World Cup season, Denmark earned the following start quotas: The country would later be reallocated quota for the men's 5000 metres event.

Men
Distance

Athlete	Event	Race	
Athlete	Event	Time	Rank
Viktor Hald Thorup	5000 m	6:28.87	19

Mass start

Athlete	Event	Semifinal			Final		
Athlete	Event	Points	Time	Rank	Points	Time	Rank
Stefan Due Schmidt	Mass start	0	7:58.01	12	did not advance		25
Viktor Hald Thorup	Mass start	1	8:21.94	10	did not advance		21

== Non-competing sports ==
=== Cross-country skiing ===
By meeting the basic qualification standards, Denmark qualified at least one male cross-country skier, however an athlete was not named to the team.
