= 2022 IIHF Women's World Championship rosters =

Each team's roster consisted of at least 15 skaters (forwards, and defencemen) and two goaltenders, and at most 20 skaters and three goaltenders. All ten participating nations, through the confirmation of their respective national associations, had to submit a roster by the first IIHF directorate.

Ages are as of 25 August 2022.

== Group A ==
=== Canada ===
The roster was announced on 15 August 2022.

Head coach: Troy Ryan

No.	Pos.	Name	Height	Weight	Birthdate	Team
3	D	Jocelyne Larocque – A	1.68 m (5 ft 6 in)	66 kg (146 lb)	19 May 1988 (aged 34)	(Canada) PWHPA Toronto
7	F	Laura Stacey	1.78 m (5 ft 10 in)	71 kg (157 lb)	5 May 1994 (aged 28)	(Canada) PWHPA Montreal
10	F	Sarah Fillier	1.65 m (5 ft 5 in)	65 kg (143 lb)	9 June 2000 (aged 22)	(United States) Princeton Tigers
12	D	Meaghan Mikkelson	1.75 m (5 ft 9 in)	68 kg (150 lb)	4 January 1985 (aged 37)	(Canada) PWHPA Calgary
14	D	Renata Fast	1.68 m (5 ft 6 in)	65 kg (143 lb)	6 October 1994 (aged 27)	(Canada) PWHPA Toronto
17	D	Ella Shelton	1.73 m (5 ft 8 in)	80 kg (180 lb)	19 January 1998 (aged 24)	(Canada) PWHPA Toronto
19	F	Brianne Jenner	1.75 m (5 ft 9 in)	71 kg (157 lb)	4 May 1991 (aged 31)	(Canada) PWHPA Toronto
20	F	Sarah Nurse	1.75 m (5 ft 9 in)	67 kg (148 lb)	4 January 1995 (aged 27)	(Canada) PWHPA Toronto
21	D	Ashton Bell	1.73 m (5 ft 8 in)	73 kg (161 lb)	7 December 1999 (aged 22)	(United States) Minnesota Duluth Bulldogs
23	D	Erin Ambrose	1.65 m (5 ft 5 in)	64 kg (141 lb)	30 April 1994 (aged 28)	(Canada) PWHPA Montreal
26	F	Emily Clark	1.70 m (5 ft 7 in)	70 kg (150 lb)	28 November 1995 (aged 26)	(Canada) PWHPA Montreal
27	F	Emma Maltais	1.60 m (5 ft 3 in)	66 kg (146 lb)	4 November 1999 (aged 22)	(United States) Ohio State Buckeyes
28	D	Micah Zandee-Hart	1.73 m (5 ft 8 in)	68 kg (150 lb)	13 January 1997 (aged 25)	(Canada) PWHPA Calgary
29	F	Marie-Philip Poulin – C	1.70 m (5 ft 7 in)	73 kg (161 lb)	28 March 1991 (aged 31)	(Canada) PWHPA Montreal
35	G	Ann-Renée Desbiens	1.75 m (5 ft 9 in)	73 kg (161 lb)	10 April 1994 (aged 28)	(Canada) PWHPA Montreal
38	G	Emerance Maschmeyer	1.68 m (5 ft 6 in)	64 kg (141 lb)	5 October 1994 (aged 27)	(Canada) PWHPA Montreal
40	F	Blayre Turnbull – A	1.70 m (5 ft 7 in)	68 kg (150 lb)	15 July 1993 (aged 29)	(Canada) PWHPA Calgary
43	F	Kristin O'Neill	1.63 m (5 ft 4 in)	57 kg (126 lb)	30 March 1998 (aged 24)	(Canada) PWHPA Toronto
44	F	Sarah Potomak	1.65 m (5 ft 5 in)	64 kg (141 lb)	19 December 1997 (aged 24)	(Canada) PWHPA Calgary
47	F	Jamie Lee Rattray	1.70 m (5 ft 7 in)	70 kg (150 lb)	30 September 1992 (aged 29)	(Canada) PWHPA Toronto
50	G	Kristen Campbell	1.78 m (5 ft 10 in)	82 kg (181 lb)	30 November 1997 (aged 24)	(Canada) PWHPA Calgary
51	F	Victoria Bach	1.62 m (5 ft 4 in)	56 kg (123 lb)	12 July 1996 (aged 26)	(Canada) PWHPA Toronto
55	F	Jessie Eldridge	1.73 m (5 ft 8 in)	77 kg (170 lb)	17 December 1997 (aged 24)	(Canada) PWHPA Montreal

=== Finland ===
The roster was announced on 3 August 2022.

Head coach: Juuso Toivola

No.	Pos.	Name	Height	Weight	Birthdate	Team
2	D	Sini Karjalainen	1.74 m (5 ft 9 in)	68 kg (150 lb)	30 January 1999 (aged 23)	(United States) Vermont Catamounts
6	D	Jenni Hiirikoski – C	1.62 m (5 ft 4 in)	62 kg (137 lb)	30 March 1987 (aged 35)	(Sweden) Luleå HF
7	D	Sanni Rantala	1.73 m (5 ft 8 in)	62 kg (137 lb)	8 July 2002 (aged 20)	(Finland) KalPa
8	D	Ella Viitasuo	1.72 m (5 ft 8 in)	69 kg (152 lb)	27 May 1996 (aged 26)	(Sweden) HV71
9	D	Nelli Laitinen	1.69 m (5 ft 7 in)	62 kg (137 lb)	29 April 2002 (aged 20)	(United States) Minnesota Golden Gophers
10	F	Elisa Holopainen	1.66 m (5 ft 5 in)	58 kg (128 lb)	27 December 2001 (aged 20)	(Finland) KalPa
12	F	Sanni Vanhanen	1.68 m (5 ft 6 in)	60 kg (130 lb)	1 July 2005 (aged 17)	(Finland) HIFK
14	D	Krista Parkkonen	1.68 m (5 ft 6 in)	65 kg (143 lb)	25 June 2002 (aged 20)	(United States) Vermont Catamounts
16	F	Petra Nieminen – A	1.69 m (5 ft 7 in)	67 kg (148 lb)	4 May 1999 (aged 23)	(Sweden) Luleå HF
18	G	Meeri Räisänen	1.70 m (5 ft 7 in)	66 kg (146 lb)	2 December 1989 (aged 32)	(United States) Connecticut Whale
19	F	Emmi Rakkolainen	1.76 m (5 ft 9 in)	62 kg (137 lb)	9 August 1996 (aged 26)	(Finland) Kiekko-Espoo
24	F	Viivi Vainikka	1.66 m (5 ft 5 in)	67 kg (148 lb)	23 December 2001 (aged 20)	(Sweden) Luleå HF
25	F	Kiira Yrjänen	1.61 m (5 ft 3 in)	58 kg (128 lb)	2 January 2002 (aged 20)	(Sweden) HV71
28	F	Jenniina Nylund	1.71 m (5 ft 7 in)	63 kg (139 lb)	18 June 1999 (aged 23)	(United States) St. Cloud State Huskies
31	G	Jenna Silvonen	1.65 m (5 ft 5 in)	61 kg (134 lb)	2 January 1999 (aged 23)	(Finland) Kiekko-Espoo
32	F	Emilia Vesa	1.77 m (5 ft 10 in)	66 kg (146 lb)	3 January 2001 (aged 21)	(Finland) HIFK
33	F	Michelle Karvinen – A	1.67 m (5 ft 6 in)	65 kg (143 lb)	27 March 1990 (aged 32)	(Sweden) Frölunda HC
34	F	Sofianna Sundelin	1.69 m (5 ft 7 in)	56 kg (123 lb)	13 January 2003 (aged 19)	(Finland) Team Kuortane
36	G	Anni Keisala	1.75 m (5 ft 9 in)	80 kg (180 lb)	5 April 1997 (aged 25)	(Sweden) HV71
40	F	Noora Tulus	1.65 m (5 ft 5 in)	59 kg (130 lb)	15 August 1995 (aged 27)	(Sweden) Luleå HF
77	F	Susanna Tapani	1.77 m (5 ft 10 in)	68 kg (150 lb)	2 March 1993 (aged 29)	
88	D	Ronja Savolainen	1.77 m (5 ft 10 in)	74 kg (163 lb)	29 November 1997 (aged 24)	(Sweden) Luleå HF
91	F	Julia Liikala	1.66 m (5 ft 5 in)	64 kg (141 lb)	20 March 2001 (aged 21)	(Finland) HIFK

=== Japan ===
The roster was announced on 10 August 2022.

Head coach: Yuji Iizuka

No.	Pos.	Name	Height	Weight	Birthdate	Team
1	G	Riko Kawaguchi	1.65 m (5 ft 5 in)	70 kg (150 lb)	19 September 2004 (aged 17)	(Japan) Daishin
2	D	Shiori Koike – C	1.59 m (5 ft 3 in)	53 kg (117 lb)	21 March 1993 (aged 29)	(Japan) DK Peregrine
3	D	Aoi Shiga	1.65 m (5 ft 5 in)	63 kg (139 lb)	4 July 1999 (aged 23)	(Japan) Toyota Cygnus
4	D	Ayaka Hitosato – A	1.61 m (5 ft 3 in)	58 kg (128 lb)	22 August 1994 (aged 28)	(Sweden) Linköping HC
5	D	Shiori Yamashita	1.58 m (5 ft 2 in)	52 kg (115 lb)	28 April 2002 (aged 20)	(Japan) Seibu Princess Rabbits
6	D	Kohane Sato	1.63 m (5 ft 4 in)	59 kg (130 lb)	16 March 2006 (aged 16)	(Japan) Daishin
7	D	Kanami Seki	1.68 m (5 ft 6 in)	70 kg (150 lb)	23 June 2000 (aged 22)	(Japan) Seibu Princess Rabbits
8	D	Akane Hosoyamada – A	1.63 m (5 ft 4 in)	59 kg (130 lb)	9 March 1992 (aged 30)	(Japan) DK Peregrine
10	F	Hikaru Yamashita	1.58 m (5 ft 2 in)	54 kg (119 lb)	23 September 2000 (aged 21)	(Japan) Seibu Princess Rabbits
11	F	Akane Shiga	1.65 m (5 ft 5 in)	61 kg (134 lb)	3 March 2001 (aged 21)	(Japan) Toyota Cygnus
13	F	Chisato Miyazaki	1.51 m (4 ft 11 in)	51 kg (112 lb)	8 August 1997 (aged 25)	(Japan) Seibu Princess Rabbits
14	F	Haruka Toko	1.67 m (5 ft 6 in)	65 kg (143 lb)	16 March 1997 (aged 25)	(Sweden) Linköping HC
16	F	Yoshino Enomoto	1.60 m (5 ft 3 in)	48 kg (106 lb)	22 September 1998 (aged 23)	(Japan) Seibu Princess Rabbits
18	F	Suzuka Taka	1.61 m (5 ft 3 in)	53 kg (117 lb)	16 October 1996 (aged 25)	(Japan) DK Peregrine
19	F	Makoto Ito	1.67 m (5 ft 6 in)	67 kg (148 lb)	2 May 2004 (aged 18)	(Japan) Daishin
20	F	Ami Sasaki	1.56 m (5 ft 1 in)	52 kg (115 lb)	3 February 2002 (aged 20)	(Japan) Toyota Cygnus
22	F	Yumeka Wajima	1.56 m (5 ft 1 in)	48 kg (106 lb)	19 October 2002 (aged 19)	(Japan) DK Peregrine
25	D	Fumika Sasano	1.67 m (5 ft 6 in)	67 kg (148 lb)	26 June 1997 (aged 25)	(Sweden) Göteborg HC
26	F	Miyuri Ogawa	1.54 m (5 ft 1 in)	55 kg (121 lb)	3 October 2000 (aged 21)	(Japan) Daishin
27	F	Remi Koyama	1.47 m (4 ft 10 in)	52 kg (115 lb)	17 July 2000 (aged 22)	(Japan) Seibu Princess Rabbits
29	G	Miyuu Masuhara	1.57 m (5 ft 2 in)	50 kg (110 lb)	4 October 2001 (aged 20)	(Japan) DK Peregrine
30	G	Akane Konishi	1.67 m (5 ft 6 in)	74 kg (163 lb)	14 August 1995 (aged 27)	(Sweden) Vänersborgs HC
79	F	Hinata Corazon Lack	1.57 m (5 ft 2 in)	52 kg (115 lb)	19 December 2003 (aged 18)	(Japan) DK Peregrine

=== Switzerland ===
The roster was announced on 17 August 2022.

Head coach: Colin Muller

No.	Pos.	Name	Height	Weight	Birthdate	Team
4	D	Nadine Hofstetter	1.65 m (5 ft 5 in)	65 kg (143 lb)	21 October 1994 (aged 27)	(Switzerland) SC Langenthal
6	F	Mara Frey	1.69 m (5 ft 7 in)	66 kg (146 lb)	26 September 2002 (aged 19)	(Switzerland) SC Langenthal
7	F	Lara Stalder – C	1.67 m (5 ft 6 in)	63 kg (139 lb)	15 May 1994 (aged 28)	(Sweden) Brynäs IF
8	F	Kaleigh Quennec	1.72 m (5 ft 8 in)	79 kg (174 lb)	15 February 1998 (aged 24)	(Canada) Montreal Carabins
9	D	Shannon Sigrist	1.67 m (5 ft 6 in)	68 kg (150 lb)	20 April 1999 (aged 23)	(Switzerland) HC Thurgau Ladies
10	D	Janine Hauser	1.70 m (5 ft 7 in)	73 kg (161 lb)	6 May 2001 (aged 21)	(Switzerland) GCK/ZSC Lions
12	F	Lisa Rüedi	1.67 m (5 ft 6 in)	67 kg (148 lb)	3 November 2000 (aged 21)	(Switzerland) GCK/ZSC Lions
14	F	Evelina Raselli – A	1.70 m (5 ft 7 in)	61 kg (134 lb)	3 May 1992 (aged 30)	(United States) Boston Pride
15	F	Laura Zimmermann	1.63 m (5 ft 4 in)	73 kg (161 lb)	5 April 2003 (aged 19)	(United States) St. Cloud State Huskies
16	D	Nicole Vallario	1.66 m (5 ft 5 in)	71 kg (157 lb)	30 August 2001 (aged 20)	(United States) St. Thomas Tommies
17	D	Lara Christen	1.63 m (5 ft 4 in)	64 kg (141 lb)	2 October 2002 (aged 19)	(Switzerland) SC Langenthal
18	D	Stefanie Wetli	1.73 m (5 ft 8 in)	71 kg (157 lb)	4 February 2000 (aged 22)	(Switzerland) HC Thurgau Ladies
19	F	Emma Ingold	1.71 m (5 ft 7 in)	62 kg (137 lb)	12 August 2002 (aged 20)	(Switzerland) SC Langenthal
20	G	Andrea Brändli	1.67 m (5 ft 6 in)	72 kg (159 lb)	5 June 1997 (aged 25)	(United States) Ohio State Buckeyes
22	F	Sinja Leemann	1.68 m (5 ft 6 in)	62 kg (137 lb)	19 April 2002 (aged 20)	(Switzerland) GCK/ZSC Lions
24	F	Noemi Ryhner	1.65 m (5 ft 5 in)	62 kg (137 lb)	24 April 2000 (aged 22)	(Sweden) Leksands IF
25	F	Alina Müller – A	1.67 m (5 ft 6 in)	63 kg (139 lb)	12 March 1998 (aged 24)	(United States) Northeastern Huskies
26	F	Dominique Rüegg	1.73 m (5 ft 8 in)	73 kg (161 lb)	5 February 1996 (aged 26)	(Switzerland) GCK/ZSC Lions
28	F	Alina Marti	1.67 m (5 ft 6 in)	67 kg (148 lb)	23 April 2004 (aged 18)	(Switzerland) GCK/ZSC Lions
29	G	Saskia Maurer	1.66 m (5 ft 5 in)	63 kg (139 lb)	29 July 2001 (aged 21)	(United States) St. Thomas Tommies
40	G	Alexandra Lehmann	1.79 m (5 ft 10 in)	85 kg (187 lb)	21 February 2000 (aged 22)	(Switzerland) EV Bomo Thun
71	F	Lena Marie Lutz	1.67 m (5 ft 6 in)	71 kg (157 lb)	12 July 2001 (aged 21)	(Switzerland) HC Ladies Lugano
82	D	Alessia Baechler	1.73 m (5 ft 8 in)	68 kg (150 lb)	7 September 2005 (aged 16)	(Switzerland) GCK/ZSC Lions

=== United States ===
The roster was announced on 14 August 2022.

Head coach: John Wroblewski

No.	Pos.	Name	Height	Weight	Birthdate	Team
2	D	Lee Stecklein – A	1.83 m (6 ft 0 in)	77 kg (170 lb)	23 April 1994 (aged 28)	(United States) PWHPA Minnesota
3	D	Cayla Barnes	1.57 m (5 ft 2 in)	63 kg (139 lb)	7 January 1999 (aged 23)	(United States) Boston College Eagles
4	D	Caroline Harvey	1.70 m (5 ft 7 in)	66 kg (146 lb)	14 October 2002 (aged 19)	(United States) Wisconsin Badgers
5	D	Megan Keller	1.80 m (5 ft 11 in)	75 kg (165 lb)	1 May 1996 (aged 26)	(United States) PWHPA New Hampshire
6	F	Lacey Eden	1.73 m (5 ft 8 in)	68 kg (150 lb)	2 May 2002 (aged 20)	(United States) Wisconsin Badgers
11	F	Abby Roque	1.70 m (5 ft 7 in)	82 kg (181 lb)	25 September 1997 (aged 24)	(United States) PWHPA Minnesota
12	F	Kelly Pannek	1.73 m (5 ft 8 in)	75 kg (165 lb)	29 December 1995 (aged 26)	(United States) PWHPA Minnesota
13	F	Grace Zumwinkle	1.75 m (5 ft 9 in)	75 kg (165 lb)	23 April 1999 (aged 23)	(United States) Minnesota Golden Gophers
15	D	Savannah Harmon	1.60 m (5 ft 3 in)	67 kg (148 lb)	27 October 1995 (aged 26)	(United States) PWHPA Minnesota
16	F	Hayley Scamurra	1.73 m (5 ft 8 in)	73 kg (161 lb)	14 December 1994 (aged 27)	(United States) PWHPA New Hampshire
18	F	Jesse Compher	1.73 m (5 ft 8 in)	68 kg (150 lb)	1 July 1999 (aged 23)	(United States) Wisconsin Badgers
19	D	Jincy Roese	1.68 m (5 ft 6 in)	70 kg (150 lb)	15 May 1997 (aged 25)	(United States) PWHPA Minnesota
20	F	Hannah Brandt	1.68 m (5 ft 6 in)	68 kg (150 lb)	27 November 1993 (aged 28)	(United States) PWHPA Minnesota
21	F	Hilary Knight – A	1.80 m (5 ft 11 in)	78 kg (172 lb)	12 July 1989 (aged 33)	(United States) PWHPA Minnesota
23	F	Hannah Bilka	1.65 m (5 ft 5 in)	59 kg (130 lb)	24 March 2001 (aged 21)	(United States) Boston College Eagles
25	F	Alex Carpenter	1.70 m (5 ft 7 in)	70 kg (150 lb)	13 April 1994 (aged 28)	(China) KRS Vanke Rays
26	F	Kendall Coyne Schofield – C	1.57 m (5 ft 2 in)	57 kg (126 lb)	25 May 1992 (aged 30)	(United States) PWHPA Minnesota
27	F	Taylor Heise	1.78 m (5 ft 10 in)	66 kg (146 lb)	17 March 2000 (aged 22)	(United States) Minnesota Golden Gophers
28	F	Amanda Kessel	1.68 m (5 ft 6 in)	59 kg (130 lb)	28 August 1991 (aged 30)	(United States) PWHPA New Hampshire
29	G	Nicole Hensley	1.68 m (5 ft 6 in)	70 kg (150 lb)	23 June 1994 (aged 28)	(United States) PWHPA Minnesota
31	G	Aerin Frankel	1.65 m (5 ft 5 in)	63 kg (139 lb)	24 May 1999 (aged 23)	(United States) Northeastern Huskies
35	G	Maddie Rooney	1.65 m (5 ft 5 in)	66 kg (146 lb)	7 July 1997 (aged 25)	(United States) PWHPA Minnesota
36	D	Rory Guilday	1.78 m (5 ft 10 in)	73 kg (161 lb)	7 September 2002 (aged 19)	(United States) Cornell Big Red

== Group B ==
=== Czechia ===
The roster was announced on 26 July 2022.

Head coach: Carla MacLeod

No.	Pos.	Name	Height	Weight	Birthdate	Team
1	G	Viktorie Švejdová	1.68 m (5 ft 6 in)	69 kg (152 lb)	24 June 2002 (aged 20)	(Sweden) SDE Hockey
2	D	Aneta Tejralová – A	1.64 m (5 ft 5 in)	53 kg (117 lb)	4 January 1996 (aged 26)	(United States) Boston Pride
3	D	Adéla Šapovalivová	1.62 m (5 ft 4 in)	54 kg (119 lb)	17 May 2006 (aged 16)	(Czech Republic) Berounští Medvědi
4	D	Daniela Pejšová	1.75 m (5 ft 9 in)	70 kg (150 lb)	14 August 2002 (aged 20)	(Sweden) Luleå HF/MSSK
8	D	Klára Seroiszková	1.75 m (5 ft 9 in)	73 kg (161 lb)	25 January 2001 (aged 21)	(Sweden) Göteborg HC
9	F	Alena Mills – C	1.73 m (5 ft 8 in)	83 kg (183 lb)	9 June 1990 (aged 32)	(Sweden) Brynäs IF
10	F	Denisa Křížová – A	1.65 m (5 ft 5 in)	64 kg (141 lb)	3 November 1994 (aged 27)	(United States) Minnesota Whitecaps
11	F	Karolína Erbanová	1.76 m (5 ft 9 in)	72 kg (159 lb)	27 October 1992 (aged 29)	(Finland) HPK
12	F	Klára Hymlarová	1.63 m (5 ft 4 in)	67 kg (148 lb)	27 February 1999 (aged 23)	(United States) St. Cloud State Huskies
13	F	Laura Lerchová	1.70 m (5 ft 7 in)	69 kg (152 lb)	13 June 2000 (aged 22)	(Sweden) Skellefteå AIK
14	D	Dominika Lásková	1.67 m (5 ft 6 in)	70 kg (150 lb)	20 December 1996 (aged 25)	(Canada) Toronto Six
15	D	Andrea Trnková	1.76 m (5 ft 9 in)	70 kg (150 lb)	3 March 2004 (aged 18)	(Czech Republic) HC Choceň
16	F	Kateřina Mrázová	1.63 m (5 ft 4 in)	63 kg (139 lb)	19 October 1992 (aged 29)	(United States) Connecticut Whale
17	D	Pavlína Horálková	1.64 m (5 ft 5 in)	61 kg (134 lb)	24 May 1991 (aged 31)	
18	F	Michaela Pejzlová	1.69 m (5 ft 7 in)	62 kg (137 lb)	4 June 1997 (aged 25)	(Finland) HIFK
19	F	Natálie Mlýnková	1.61 m (5 ft 3 in)	61 kg (134 lb)	24 May 2001 (aged 21)	(United States) Vermont Catamounts
23	F	Agáta Sarnovská	1.74 m (5 ft 9 in)	75 kg (165 lb)	17 October 2001 (aged 20)	(Sweden) AIK
25	F	Kristýna Pátková	1.67 m (5 ft 6 in)	70 kg (150 lb)	17 June 1998 (aged 24)	(United States) Vermont Catamounts
26	F	Vendula Přibylová	1.71 m (5 ft 7 in)	78 kg (172 lb)	23 March 1996 (aged 26)	(Sweden) Modo
27	D	Tereza Radová	1.76 m (5 ft 9 in)	74 kg (163 lb)	22 November 2001 (aged 20)	(Sweden) Leksands IF
28	F	Noemi Neubauerová	1.73 m (5 ft 8 in)	69 kg (152 lb)	15 December 1999 (aged 22)	(United States) Providence Friars
29	G	Klára Peslarová	1.64 m (5 ft 5 in)	63 kg (139 lb)	23 November 1996 (aged 25)	(Sweden) Brynäs IF
31	G	Blanka Škodová	1.77 m (5 ft 10 in)	68 kg (150 lb)	1 October 1997 (aged 24)	(United States) Minnesota Duluth Bulldogs

=== Denmark ===
The roster was announced on 13 August 2022.

Head coach: Björn Edlund

No.	Pos.	Name	Height	Weight	Birthdate	Team
1	G	Mille Kieler Jensen	1.68 m (5 ft 6 in)	66 kg (146 lb)	9 November 2002 (aged 19)	(Denmark) Odense IK
4	F	Silke Glud	1.75 m (5 ft 9 in)	65 kg (143 lb)	3 March 1996 (aged 26)	(Sweden) IF Malmö
8	F	Josefine Persson – A	1.76 m (5 ft 9 in)	70 kg (150 lb)	28 March 1994 (aged 28)	(Sweden) Luleå HF
11	D	Amalie Andersen	1.73 m (5 ft 8 in)	69 kg (152 lb)	6 October 1999 (aged 22)	(United States) Maine Black Bears
12	F	Mille Sørensen	1.55 m (5 ft 1 in)	60 kg (130 lb)	17 December 2001 (aged 20)	(Sweden) IF Malmö
13	F	Michele Brix	1.69 m (5 ft 7 in)	75 kg (165 lb)	10 July 1996 (aged 26)	(Denmark) Odense IK
14	F	Nicoline Jensen – A	1.65 m (5 ft 5 in)	65 kg (143 lb)	8 November 1992 (aged 29)	(Denmark) Rødovre SIK
15	D	Amanda Refsgaard	1.75 m (5 ft 9 in)	63 kg (139 lb)	8 March 2000 (aged 22)	(Denmark) Rødovre SIK
16	F	Nathalie Perry	1.72 m (5 ft 8 in)	68 kg (150 lb)	24 December 1996 (aged 25)	(Sweden) IF Malmö
17	F	Sofia Skriver	1.65 m (5 ft 5 in)	60 kg (130 lb)	7 June 2003 (aged 19)	(Sweden) Luleå HF
18	F	Maria Peters	1.68 m (5 ft 6 in)	60 kg (130 lb)	16 September 1999 (aged 22)	(Denmark) Odense IK
19	D	Josephine Asperup	1.63 m (5 ft 4 in)	64 kg (141 lb)	21 July 1992 (aged 30)	(Sweden) IF Malmö
21	F	Michelle Weis	1.69 m (5 ft 7 in)	59 kg (130 lb)	10 April 1997 (aged 25)	(Sweden) IF Malmö
22	D	Sofie Skott	1.72 m (5 ft 8 in)	62 kg (137 lb)	14 June 2002 (aged 20)	(United States) Vermont Catamounts
23	F	Julie Oksbjerg	1.78 m (5 ft 10 in)	67 kg (148 lb)	2 December 2000 (aged 21)	(Denmark) Odense IK
27	F	Lilli Friis-Hansen	1.63 m (5 ft 4 in)	55 kg (121 lb)	27 January 2000 (aged 22)	(Denmark) Rødovre SIK
30	G	Lisa Jensen	1.65 m (5 ft 5 in)	61 kg (134 lb)	26 February 1997 (aged 25)	(Sweden) IF Malmö
50	F	Mia Bau Hansen	1.67 m (5 ft 6 in)	65 kg (143 lb)	22 June 1995 (aged 27)	(Sweden) IF Malmö
63	F	Josefine Jakobsen – C	1.70 m (5 ft 7 in)	72 kg (159 lb)	17 May 1991 (aged 31)	(Sweden) Djurgårdens IF
68	D	Emma Russell	1.68 m (5 ft 6 in)	75 kg (165 lb)	18 August 1995 (aged 27)	(Denmark) Rødovre SIK
72	G	Cassandra Repstock-Romme	1.71 m (5 ft 7 in)	72 kg (159 lb)	26 August 2001 (aged 20)	(Denmark) Hvidovre IK
80	F	Julie Østergaard	1.70 m (5 ft 7 in)	67 kg (148 lb)	6 August 1995 (aged 27)	(Denmark) Hvidovre IK
87	D	Simone Jacquet Thrysøe	1.80 m (5 ft 11 in)	72 kg (159 lb)	23 April 1987 (aged 35)	(Denmark) Aalborg IK

=== Germany ===
A 28-player roster was announced on 13 August 2022. The final squad was revealed on 21 August 2022.

Head Coach: Thomas Schädler

No.	Pos.	Name	Height	Weight	Birthdate	Team
6	F	Theresa Wagner	1.64 m (5 ft 5 in)	56 kg (123 lb)	5 May 1995 (aged 27)	(Germany) ERC Ingolstadt
7	F	Franziska Feldmeier	1.67 m (5 ft 6 in)	67 kg (148 lb)	5 February 1999 (aged 23)	(Germany) ESC Planegg
11	F	Nicola Eisenschmid	1.66 m (5 ft 5 in)	65 kg (143 lb)	10 September 1996 (aged 25)	(Sweden) Djurgårdens IF
13	F	Luisa Welcke	1.65 m (5 ft 5 in)	63 kg (139 lb)	29 April 2002 (aged 20)	(United States) Maine Black Bears
14	D	Carina Strobel	1.72 m (5 ft 8 in)	60 kg (130 lb)	11 September 1997 (aged 24)	(Germany) ECDC Memmingen Indians
16	F	Jule Schiefer	1.75 m (5 ft 9 in)	59 kg (130 lb)	12 September 2001 (aged 20)	(Germany) ERC Ingolstadt
17	D	Lena Düsterhöft	1.77 m (5 ft 10 in)	70 kg (150 lb)	26 August 1996 (aged 25)	(Germany) ERC Ingolstadt
18	F	Bernadette Karpf	1.67 m (5 ft 6 in)	61 kg (134 lb)	3 July 1996 (aged 26)	(Sweden) Leksands IF
20	D	Daria Gleissner – C	1.70 m (5 ft 7 in)	71 kg (157 lb)	30 June 1993 (aged 29)	(Germany) ECDC Memmingen Indians
21	D	Tabea Botthof	1.75 m (5 ft 9 in)	73 kg (161 lb)	1 June 2000 (aged 22)	(United States) Yale Bulldogs
22	F	Marie Delarbre	1.74 m (5 ft 9 in)	70 kg (150 lb)	22 January 1994 (aged 28)	(Sweden) Djurgårdens IF
23	D	Tanja Eisenschmid – A	1.72 m (5 ft 8 in)	69 kg (152 lb)	20 April 1993 (aged 29)	(Sweden) Djurgårdens IF
25	F	Laura Kluge – A	1.78 m (5 ft 10 in)	55 kg (121 lb)	6 November 1996 (aged 25)	(Germany) ECDC Memmingen Indians
26	F	Anne Bartsch	1.63 m (5 ft 4 in)	61 kg (134 lb)	22 September 1995 (aged 26)	(Germany) ECDC Memmingen Indians
27	D	Heidi Strompf	1.64 m (5 ft 5 in)	58 kg (128 lb)	10 September 2002 (aged 19)	(Slovakia) HC Prešov Penguins
28	D	Nina Jobst-Smith	1.65 m (5 ft 5 in)	63 kg (139 lb)	30 August 2001 (aged 20)	(United States) Minnesota Duluth Bulldogs
29	F	Nina Christof	1.62 m (5 ft 4 in)	64 kg (141 lb)	18 August 2002 (aged 20)	(United States) RPI Engineers
31	G	Lilly Uhrmann	1.63 m (5 ft 4 in)	63 kg (139 lb)	20 June 2003 (aged 19)	(Germany) ECDC Memmingen Indians
33	F	Lilli Welcke	1.65 m (5 ft 5 in)	65 kg (143 lb)	29 April 2002 (aged 20)	(United States) Maine Black Bears
34	F	Celina Haider	1.70 m (5 ft 7 in)	65 kg (143 lb)	20 July 2000 (aged 22)	(Germany) ERC Ingolstadt
35	G	Sandra Abstreiter	1.81 m (5 ft 11 in)	67 kg (148 lb)	23 July 1998 (aged 24)	(United States) Providence Friars
36	F	Sonja Weidenfelder	1.65 m (5 ft 5 in)	63 kg (139 lb)	7 March 1993 (aged 29)	(Germany) ECDC Memmingen Indians
95	G	Franziska Albl	1.67 m (5 ft 6 in)	67 kg (148 lb)	29 April 1995 (aged 27)	(Germany) Wanderers Germering

=== Hungary ===
The roster was announced on 29 July 2022.

Head coach: Pat Cortina

No.	Pos.	Name	Height	Weight	Birthdate	Team
1	G	Anikó Németh	1.65 m (5 ft 5 in)	61 kg (134 lb)	6 September 1996 (aged 25)	(Hungary) MAC Budapest
2	D	Bernadett Németh	1.65 m (5 ft 5 in)	57 kg (126 lb)	6 September 1996 (aged 25)	(Hungary) MAC Budapest
3	F	Hayley Williams	1.63 m (5 ft 4 in)	60 kg (130 lb)	3 June 1990 (aged 32)	(Hungary) KMH Budapest
4	D	Taylor Baker	1.63 m (5 ft 4 in)	69 kg (152 lb)	30 July 1997 (aged 25)	(Hungary) MAC Budapest
7	D	Adél Márton	1.64 m (5 ft 5 in)	62 kg (137 lb)	26 July 2004 (aged 18)	(Hungary) Budapest JA
8	F	Petra Szamosfalvi	1.63 m (5 ft 4 in)	60 kg (130 lb)	10 May 2002 (aged 20)	(Hungary) KMH Budapest
10	F	Imola Horváth	1.67 m (5 ft 6 in)	72 kg (159 lb)	2 August 2002 (aged 20)	(Sweden) Göteborg HC
11	F	Fanni Gasparics – C	1.67 m (5 ft 6 in)	61 kg (134 lb)	20 November 1994 (aged 27)	(Hungary) MAC Budapest
12	F	Lara Strobl	1.65 m (5 ft 5 in)	48 kg (106 lb)	11 May 2003 (aged 19)	(Hungary) Budapest JA
13	D	Lotti Odnoga – A	1.74 m (5 ft 9 in)	71 kg (157 lb)	19 January 1999 (aged 23)	(United States) Dartmouth Big Green
14	D	Franciska Kiss-Simon	1.80 m (5 ft 11 in)	75 kg (165 lb)	7 November 1995 (aged 26)	(Hungary) KMH Budapest
15	F	Réka Dabasi	1.68 m (5 ft 6 in)	60 kg (130 lb)	24 December 1996 (aged 25)	(United States) Metropolitan Riveters
17	F	Zsófia Pázmándi	1.63 m (5 ft 4 in)	63 kg (139 lb)	16 December 2002 (aged 19)	(Hungary) MAC Budapest
18	F	Alexandra Huszák – A	1.73 m (5 ft 8 in)	63 kg (139 lb)	18 June 1995 (aged 27)	(Hungary) KMH Budapest
22	F	Alexandra Rónai	1.60 m (5 ft 3 in)	59 kg (130 lb)	8 December 1993 (aged 28)	(Hungary) MAC Budapest
25	G	Bianka Bogáti	1.63 m (5 ft 4 in)	52 kg (115 lb)	21 January 2005 (aged 17)	(Hungary) Budapest JA
33	G	Zsuzsa Révész	1.65 m (5 ft 5 in)	80 kg (180 lb)	17 August 2005 (aged 17)	(Hungary) Debreceni HK
71	D	Fruzsina Mayer	1.68 m (5 ft 6 in)	78 kg (172 lb)	16 July 2000 (aged 22)	(Canada) HTI Stars
72	F	Míra Seregély	1.76 m (5 ft 9 in)	64 kg (141 lb)	27 April 2003 (aged 19)	(United States) Maine Black Bears
77	F	Regina Metzler	1.77 m (5 ft 10 in)	73 kg (161 lb)	25 October 2005 (aged 16)	(Hungary) Budapest Stars
88	F	Emma Kreisz	1.75 m (5 ft 9 in)	70 kg (150 lb)	2 September 2003 (aged 18)	(Canada) Stanstead College
96	D	Sarah Knee	1.85 m (6 ft 1 in)	86 kg (190 lb)	29 March 1996 (aged 26)	(Hungary) KMH Budapest
97	F	Kinga Jókai-Szilágyi	1.70 m (5 ft 7 in)	62 kg (137 lb)	19 August 1997 (aged 25)	(Austria) EHV Sabres Vienna

=== Sweden ===
The roster was announced on 13 August 2022.

Head Coach: Ulf Lundberg

No.	Pos.	Name	Height	Weight	Birthdate	Team
1	G	Ida Boman	1.66 m (5 ft 5 in)	58 kg (128 lb)	1 April 2003 (aged 19)	(Sweden) Djurgårdens IF
3	D	Anna Kjellbin – A	1.69 m (5 ft 7 in)	63 kg (139 lb)	16 March 1994 (aged 28)	(Sweden) Luleå HF/MSSK
6	D	Mira Jungåker	1.69 m (5 ft 7 in)	62 kg (137 lb)	22 July 2005 (aged 17)	(Sweden) HV71
8	D	Ebba Berglund	1.61 m (5 ft 3 in)	63 kg (139 lb)	13 June 1998 (aged 24)	(United States) Metropolitan Riveters
9	D	Jessica Adolfsson	1.78 m (5 ft 10 in)	80 kg (180 lb)	15 July 1998 (aged 24)	(Sweden) Linköping HC
10	D	Mina Waxin	1.64 m (5 ft 5 in)	60 kg (130 lb)	29 April 2001 (aged 21)	(Sweden) Brynäs IF
11	F	Josefin Bouveng	1.75 m (5 ft 9 in)	69 kg (152 lb)	15 May 2001 (aged 21)	(United States) Minnesota Golden Gophers
12	D	Maja Nylén Persson – A	1.64 m (5 ft 5 in)	67 kg (148 lb)	20 November 2000 (aged 21)	(Sweden) Brynäs IF
13	F	Emma Murén	1.66 m (5 ft 5 in)	65 kg (143 lb)	17 January 1998 (aged 24)	(Sweden) Färjestad BK
16	F	Linnéa Johansson	1.71 m (5 ft 7 in)	69 kg (152 lb)	5 April 2002 (aged 20)	(Sweden) Linköping HC
17	F	Sofie Lundin	1.64 m (5 ft 5 in)	63 kg (139 lb)	15 February 2000 (aged 22)	(United States) Ohio State Buckeyes
18	F	Jenny Antonsson	1.73 m (5 ft 8 in)	77 kg (170 lb)	23 December 2001 (aged 20)	(Sweden) Brynäs IF
19	F	Sara Hjalmarsson	1.76 m (5 ft 9 in)	74 kg (163 lb)	8 February 1998 (aged 24)	(United States) Providence Friars
20	D	Paula Bergström	1.72 m (5 ft 8 in)	69 kg (152 lb)	26 January 1999 (aged 23)	(United States) LIU Sharks
21	F	Celine Tedenby	1.67 m (5 ft 6 in)	67 kg (148 lb)	15 June 1999 (aged 23)	(United States) Merrimack Warriors
23	F	Thea Johansson	1.71 m (5 ft 7 in)	67 kg (148 lb)	22 November 2002 (aged 19)	(United States) Mercyhurst Lakers
24	F	Felizia Wikner-Zienkiewicz	1.70 m (5 ft 7 in)	65 kg (143 lb)	17 September 1999 (aged 22)	(Sweden) Brynäs IF
25	F	Lina Ljungblom	1.67 m (5 ft 6 in)	79 kg (174 lb)	15 October 2001 (aged 20)	(Sweden) Modo Hockey
26	F	Hanna Olsson	1.73 m (5 ft 8 in)	69 kg (152 lb)	20 January 1999 (aged 23)	(Sweden) Frölunda HC
28	F	Michelle Löwenhielm – C	1.72 m (5 ft 8 in)	67 kg (148 lb)	22 March 1995 (aged 27)	(Sweden) SDE Hockey
29	F	Olivia Carlsson	1.74 m (5 ft 9 in)	75 kg (165 lb)	2 March 1995 (aged 27)	(Sweden) Modo Hockey
30	G	Emma Söderberg	1.71 m (5 ft 7 in)	69 kg (152 lb)	18 February 1998 (aged 24)	(United States) Minnesota Duluth Bulldogs
35	G	Ellen Jonsson	1.72 m (5 ft 8 in)	67 kg (148 lb)	8 June 1998 (aged 24)	(Sweden) AIK
