= Ice hockey at the 2014 Winter Olympics – Women's qualification =

Qualification for the women's tournament at the 2014 Winter Olympics determined by the IIHF World Ranking following the 2012 IIHF Women's World Championships. The top five teams in the World Ranking received automatic berths into the Olympics, Russia received an automatic berth as host, and all other teams had an opportunity to qualify for the remaining two spots.

== Qualified teams ==
Event	Date	Location	Vacancies	Qualified
Host			1	Russia
2012 IIHF World Ranking	4 April 2009 – 14 April 2012	(United States) Burlington	5	Canada; United States; Finland; Switzerland; Sweden
Final qualification tournament	7–10 February 2013	(Slovakia) Poprad	1	Japan
Final qualification tournament	7–10 February 2013	(Germany) Weiden	1	Germany
TOTAL			8	

Notes

1. ^{a} 2012 IIHF World Ranking were comprising the following events: 2009 World Championships, 2010 Winter Olympic Games, 2011 World Championships and 2012 World Championships.
2. ^{b} Burlington was the site for 2012 World Championship; at the conclusion of the tournament the ranking were finalized with regards to the qualification slots.

== IIHF World Ranking ==
Qualified directly to Olympic Tournament
Final qualification
Pre-qualification
Preliminary qualification

Rank	Team	WC 2012 (100%)	WC 2011 (75%)	OLY 2010 (50%)	WC 2009 (25%)	Total
1	Canada	1200	1160	1200	1160	2960
2	United States	1160	1200	1160	1200	2940
3	Finland	1100	1120	1120	1120	2780
4	Switzerland	1120	1040	1060	1020	2685
5	Sweden	1060	1060	1100	1100	2680
6	Russia	1040	1100	1040	1060	2650
7	Slovakia	1000	1020	1000	940	2500
8	Germany	1020	960	920	920	2430
9	Kazakhstan	860	1000	960	1040	2350
10	Norway	940	940	900	900	2320
11	Japan	920	860	940	1000	2285
12	Czech Republic	960	840	880	860	2245
13	China	820	880	1020	980	2235
14	Latvia	880	920	840	820	2195
15	Austria	900	900	780	880	2185
16	France	800	820	860	840	2055
17	Great Britain	780	760	820	780	1955
18	Italy	740	780	800	760	1915
19	Denmark	840	800		740	1625
20	Slovenia	640	660	740		1505
21	Netherlands	760	720		720	1480
22	Croatia	620	640	760		1480
23	Hungary	700	680			1210
24	Australia	680	700			1205
25	New Zealand	660	600			1110
26	South Korea	560	580			995
27	Belgium	520	620			985
28	Poland	600	500			975
29	Iceland	540	560			960
30	Spain	580	480			940
31	North Korea	720	0		800	920
32	South Africa	500	520			890
33	Bulgaria		460	720		705
34	Romania		540			405
35	Turkey		440			330
36	Ireland		420			315

== Olympic preliminary qualification ==
Group G was played 12–14 October in Barcelona, while Group H was played 27–30 September in Jastrzebie-Zdroj. Denmark and Slovenia were the expected hosts, being the nations ranked 19th and 20th respectively amongst participating nations. The winners of each tournament advanced to the Olympic Pre-Qualification tournaments in November of the same year.

=== Group G ===
Team	GP	W	OTW	OTL	L	GF	GA	DIF	PTS
Denmark	3	3	0	0	0	30	4	+26	9
Hungary	3	2	0	0	1	18	6	+12	6
Spain	3	1	0	0	2	3	14	−11	3
Croatia	3	0	0	0	3	3	30	−27	0

All times are local (UTC+2).

12 October 2012; 16:00	Hungary	3–4 (2–1, 0–3, 1–0)	Denmark	Pista de Gel Camp Nou; Attendance: 400

Game reference

Anikó Németh
Goalies
Kamilla Nielsen
Referee:
(Norway) Janne Vesterheim Krogh
Linesmen:
(Germany) Melanie Bauer
(Czech Republic) Gabriela Malá

T. Horváth (F. Gasparics) – 03:35	1–0
	1–1	08:19 – J. Persson (M. Olausson) (PP)
F. Gasparics (T. Horváth) – 10:30	2–1
	2–2	23:55 – E. Russell (J. Persson)
	2–3	30:23 – M. Henriksen (M. Olausson)
	2–4	38:40 – C. Densing (C. Andersen) (PP)
Z. Jókai-Szilágyi (F. Gasparics) – 44:58	3–4

16 min
Penalties
10 min
18
Shots
16

12 October 2012; 20:00	Croatia	1–2 (1–2, 0–0, 0–0)	Spain	Pista de Gel Camp Nou; Attendance: 650

Game reference

Petra Belobrk
Goalies
Carlota Alvarado
Referee:
(Sweden) Gabriella Gran
Linesmen:
(Russia) Elena Ivanova
(Iceland) Steinunn Sigurgeirsdóttir

A. Širanović (N. Matić) – 00:29	1–0
	1–1	02:39 – A. González (V. Ibañez)
	1–2	16:45 – A. Ucedo (A. Calero)

8 min
Penalties
6 min
28
Shots
20

13 October 2012; 16:00	Croatia	1–8 (0–0, 0–6, 1–2)	Hungary	Pista de Gel Camp Nou; Attendance: 150

Game reference

Petra Belobrk
Lana Belič
Goalies
Boglárka Gegesy
Referee:
(Slovakia) Nikoleta Celarova
Linesmen:
(Russia) Elena Ivanova
(Italy) Helga Tschorner

	0–1	27:56 – N. Brgles (V. Somogyi, Z. Jókai-Szilágyi)
	0–2	29:15 – A. Huszák (F. Kiss-Simon)
	0–3	32:01 – F. Gasparics (A. Huszák, A. Kiss)
	0–4	38:03 – A. Huszák (F. Gasparics)
	0–5	38:17 – F. Gasparics (F. Kiss-Simon, A. Kiss)
	0–6	39:13 – Z. Jókai-Szilágyi (V. Somogyi)
	0–7	43:12 – L. Pintér (T. Horváth, R. Dabasi)
A. Širanović (D. Kruselj-Posavec, M. Pack) – 50:06	1–7
	1–8	54:33 – R. Dabasi (L. Pintér) (PP)

10 min
Penalties
4 min
10
Shots
36

13 October 2012; 20:00	Denmark	6–0 (2–0, 3–0, 1–0)	Spain	Pista de Gel Camp Nou; Attendance: 900

Game reference

Kamilla Lund Nielsen
Goalies
Carlota Alvarado
Virginia Martínez
Referee:
(Norway) Janne Vesterheim Krogh
Linesmen:
(Germany) Melanie Bauer
(Czech Republic) Gabriela Malá

J. Gregersen (A. Asperup) – 02:44	1–0
M. Olausson (C. Densing) (PP) – 13:51	2–0
M. Frandsen (J. Persson) (PP) – 20:46	3–0
J. Gregersen (J. Persson) – 24:29	4–0
M. Olausson (M. Henriksen) – 30:30	5–0
M. Henriksen (C. Andersen, S. Glud) – 49:04	6–0

8 min
Penalties
16 min
44
Shots
8

14 October 2012; 16:00	Denmark	20–1 (6–0, 5–0, 9–1)	Croatia	Pista de Gel Camp Nou; Attendance: 150

Game reference

Mette Vorup
Goalies
Petra Belobrk
Lana Belič
Referee:
(Sweden) Gabriella Gran
Linesmen:
(Czech Republic) Gabriela Malá
(Iceland) Steinunn Sigurgeirsdóttir

L. Ernst (M. Olausson, I. Rosendal) – 04:53	1–0
J. Gregersen (E. Russell) – 05:33	2–0
J. Gregersen (J. Persson) – 14:22	3–0
J. Jensen – 16:59	4–0
S. Glud (C. Andersen) – 18:17	5–0
L. Ernst – 19:26	6–0
S. Jacquet (J. Langsager) – 23:19	7–0
M. Henriksen (J. Langsager) – 26:00	8–0
M. Henriksen (PP) – 33:59	9–0
J. Persson (L. Ernst) – 35:36	10–0
J. Gregersen (J. Persson) – 38:57	11–0
	11–1	41:48 – D. Kruselj-Posavec
J. Gregersen (L. Hansen) – 42:48	12–1
M. Henriksen (J. Persson) – 43:25	13–1
J. Persson (M. Henriksen) – 52:27	14–1
I. Rosendal (M. Olausson) – 54:04	15–1
M. Nielsen (J. Asperup) – 54:54	16–1
E. Russell (J. Persson, L. Ernst) – 56:11	17–1
S. Glud (J. Gregersen) – 57:10	18–1
J. Jensen – 58:10	19–1
L. Hansen (M. Nielsen) – 58:20	20–1

0 min
Penalties
6 min
52
Shots
9

14 October 2012; 20:00	Spain	1–7 (0–2, 0–0, 1–5)	Hungary	Pista de Gel Camp Nou; Attendance: 850

Game reference

Carlota Alvarado
Goalies
Anikó Németh
Referee:
(Slovakia) Nikoleta Celarova
Linesmen:
(Russia) Elena Ivanova
(Italy) Helga Tschorner

	0–1	10:03 – T. Horváth (L. Pintér)
	0–2	13:33 – D. Medgyes (R. Dabasi)
L. Abrisqueta (PP) – 45:47	1–2
	1–3	46:22 – L. Pintér (T. Horváth)
	1–4	52:10 – R. Dabasi (L. Pintér)
	1–5	53:20 – A. Huszák (F. Kiss-Simon, F. Gasparics)
	1–6	54:14 – F. Gasparics (A. Huszák)
	1–7	59:30 – A. Huszák (F. Kiss-Simon) (PP)

6 min
Penalties
10 min
16
Shots
40

=== Group H ===
Team	GP	W	OTW	OTL	L	GF	GA	DIF	PTS
Netherlands	3	2	1	0	0	14	6	+8	8
Poland	3	1	1	1	0	11	10	+1	6
Slovenia	3	1	0	1	1	5	8	−3	4
South Korea	3	0	0	0	3	4	10	−6	0

Team advanced to Olympic Pre-Qualification

All times are local (UTC+2).

27 September 2012; 16:00	Netherlands	5–2 (1–1, 1–1, 3–1)	South Korea	Jastor Arena; Attendance: 100

Game reference

Claudia van Leeuwen
Nadia Zijstra
Goalies
Shin So-jung
Referee:
(Germany) Ramona Weiss
Linesmen:
(Norway) Anna Nygard
(Poland) Joanna Pobozniak

J. de Graaf – 18:04	1–0
	1–1	21:19 – Han S.J. (Park J.A., Park Y.E.) (PP)
J. Schipper (M. de Jong, S. Wielenga) (PP) – 38:06	2–1
J. Zwarthoed (S. Wielenga, M. Martens) (PP) – 51:37	3–1
C. Keijzer (H. Huisman, G. Barton) (PP) – 53:16	4–1
	4–2	54:33 – Ahn K.Y. (Park J.A., Yong H.Y.) (PP)
S. Wielenga (M. de Jong) (ENG) – 58:52	5–2

18 min
Penalties
30 min
40
Shots
12

27 September 2012; 19:30	Poland	4–3 GWS (1–0, 0–1, 2–2) (OT 0–0) (SO: 1–0)	Slovenia	Jastor Arena; Attendance: 300

Game reference

Agata Kosińska
Goalies
Hedvika Korbar
Referee:
(Russia) Arina Ustinova
Linesmen:
(Hungary) Zsuzsanna Sandor
(Denmark) Malene Skovbakke

K. Późniewska – 18:28	1–0
	1–1	39:04 – P. Pren (L. Deisinger)
K. Późniewska – 45:20	2–1
M. Czaplik (K. Późniewska) (PP) – 47:28	3–1
	3–2	50:54 – T. Lahajnar (P. Pren, N. Vakaricić) (PP)
	3–3	59:03 – N. Vakaricić (P. Pren, M. Manfreda) (PP)

K. Frackowiak (miss)
M. Bigos (miss)
K. Późniewska (miss)
K. Późniewska
Shootout
(miss) I. Kraner
(miss) P. Pren
(miss) A. Prsina
(miss) P. Pren
14 min
Penalties
4 min
39
Shots
25

28 September 2012; 16:00	Slovenia	2–0 (1–0, 0–0, 1–0)	South Korea	Jastor Arena; Attendance: 50

Game reference
Hedvika Korbar	Goalies	Shin So-jung	Referee: (United States) Leah O'Brien; Linesmen: (Poland) Joanna Pobozniak (Hungary) Zsuzsanna Sandor
P. Pren (L. Deisinger, T. Lahajnar) (PP) – 11:32 / 1–0; A. Prsina – 56:31 / 2–0			Referee: (United States) Leah O'Brien; Linesmen: (Poland) Joanna Pobozniak (Hungary) Zsuzsanna Sandor
8 min	Penalties	14 min	Referee: (United States) Leah O'Brien; Linesmen: (Poland) Joanna Pobozniak (Hungary) Zsuzsanna Sandor
18	Shots	42	Referee: (United States) Leah O'Brien; Linesmen: (Poland) Joanna Pobozniak (Hungary) Zsuzsanna Sandor

28 September 2012; 19:30	Netherlands	5–4 OT (1–1, 0–1, 3–2) (OT 1–0)	Poland	Jastor Arena; Attendance: 300

Game reference

Claudia van Leeuwen
Goalies
Malgorzata Burda
Referee:
(Germany) Ramona Weiss
Linesmen:
(Norway) Anna Nygard
(Germany) Caroline Sauer

	0–1	06:49 – S. Kosakowska (K. Frackowiak, I. Malinowska)
S. Wielenga (J. Zwarthoed, M. Martens) – 19:51	1–1
	1–2	26:33 – S. Kosakowska (K. Frackowiak S. Bielas)
	1–3	40:43 – K. Późniewska (K. Chrapek, I. Malinowska) (PP2)
M. de Jong (J. Zwarthoed, J. de Graaf) – 45:43	2–3
S. Wielenga (J. Zwarthoed, M. Martens) – 47:08	3–3
	3–4	57:40 – M. Bigos (S. Kosakowska, S. Bielas)
J. Schipper (S. Wielenga, M. de Jong) – 59:57	4–4
J. Zwarthoed (J. de Graaf, M. de Jong) (PP) – 61:44	5–4

12 min
Penalties
6 min
35
Shots
33

30 September 2012; 13:00	Slovenia	0–4 (0–1, 0–1, 0–2)	Netherlands	Jastor Arena; Attendance: 100

Game reference

Hedvika Korbar
Goalies
Claudia van Leeuwen
Nadia Zijlstra
Referee:
(Russia) Arina Ustinova
Linesmen:
(Poland) Joanna Pobozniak
(Germany) Caroline Sauer

0–1	04:54 – S. Wielenga
0–2	28:28 – J. Zwarthoed (M. De Jong)
0–3	45:14 – M. de Jong (J. Zwarthoed)
0–4	52:21 – M. de Jong (PP)

8 min
Penalties
16 min
14
Shots
36

30 September 2012; 16:30	South Korea	2–3 (0–1, 0–0, 2–2)	Poland	Jastor Arena; Attendance: 300

Game reference

Shin So-jung
Goalies
Agata Kosińska
Referee:
(United States) Leah O'Brien
Linesmen:
(Norway) Anna Nygard
(Denmark) Malene Skovbakke

	0–1	08:46 – M. Szynal (P. Kulas, E. Czarnecka)
Jo S.S. (Han J.Y.) – 50:59	1–1
	1–2	55:57 – I. Malinowska
Park J.A. (Ko C.R., Han S.J.) (PP) – 57:59	2–2
	2–3	59:20 – M. Bigos

8 min
Penalties
12 min
17
Shots
30

== Olympic pre-qualification ==
The two preliminary round winners joined the nations ranked thirteen to eighteen. Two round robins were played from 8–11 November 2012 in Shanghai and Valmiera. The winners of each group advanced to the final qualification tournaments.

=== Group E ===
Team	GP	W	OTW	OTL	L	GF	GA	DIF	PTS
China	3	2	1	0	0	14	5	+9	8
France	3	1	0	2	0	13	8	+5	5
Great Britain	3	1	0	0	2	2	13	−11	3
Netherlands	3	0	1	0	2	7	10	−3	2

All times are local (UTC+8).

8 November 2012; 15:00	France	7–0 (1–0, 2–0, 4–0)	Great Britain	S.U.S. Sport Complex; Attendance: 147

Game reference

Caroline Baldin
Goalies
Nicole Jackson
Referee:
(Japan) Kyoko Ugajin
Linesmen:
(China) Ma Jinping
(Canada) Lacey Senuk

M. Allemoz (E. Passard) (PP) – 19:46	1–0
S. Fohrer (L. Baudrit) – 20:22	2–0
S. Fohrer (L. Baudrit) – 24:06	3–0
. Allemoz (B. Jouanny) (PP) – 41:28	4–0
E. Passard (B. Jouanny) (PP) – 42:25	5–0
D. Gicquel – 47:28	6–0
L. Baudrit (G. Gendarme) (PP) – 56:00	7–0

12 min
Penalties
14 min
54
Shots
12

8 November 2012; 19:00	China	5–2 (1–0, 1–1, 3–1)	Netherlands	S.U.S. Sport Complex; Attendance: 779

Game reference

Shi Yao
Goalies
Claudia van Leeuwen
Referee:
(Canada) Genevieve Bordeleau
Linesmen:
(United States) Michaela Frattarelli
(Japan) Chieko Inoue

Kong M. (Jin F., Jiang N.) (PP) – 09:34	1–0
Sun R. – 26:16	2–0
	2–1	30:43 – M. de Jong
Tang L. (Sun R.) – 42:55	3–1
	3–2	44:24 – M. de Jong
Yu B. (Qi X., Jin F.) (PP) – 47:17	4–2
Sun R. (PP) – 58:39	5–2

14 min
Penalties
10 min
61
Shots
13

9 November 2012; 15:00	France	3–4 GWS (1–0, 1–2, 1–1) (OT: 0–0) (SO: 0–1)	Netherlands	S.U.S. Sport Complex; Attendance: 137

Game reference

Caroline Baldin
Goalies
Claudia van Leeuwen
Referee:
(United States) Erin Blair
Linesmen:
(China) Ma Jinping
(China) Wang Hui

L. Escudero (E. Passard, V. Bouetz Andrieu) (PP) – 19:45	1–0
D. Gicquel (A. Cuasnet, A. Bouche) – 22:51	2–0
	2–1	27:06 – Z. Barbier
	2–2	36:13 – B. van Nes (G. Barton)
L. Baudrit (S. Fohrer) – 53:28	3–2
	3–3	58:51 – M. de Jong

M. Allemoz (miss)
E. Passard (miss)
S. Fohrer (miss)
Shootout
(miss) J. Zwarthoed
(miss) M. de Jong
S. Wielenga
8 min
Penalties
10 min
66
Shots
19

9 November 2012; 19:00	Great Britain	0–5 (0–2, 0–2, 0–1)	China	S.U.S. Sport Complex; Attendance: 363

Game reference

Chelsea Mackenzie
Goalies
Shi Yao
Referee:
(Japan) Kyoko Ugajin
Linesmen:
(United States) Michaela Frattarelli
(Canada) Lacey Senuk

0–1	06:29 – Kong M. (Sun R.)
0–2	14:19 – Sun R. (Qi X.)
0–3	26:11 – Tang L. (Sun R.) (PP)
0–4	34:09 – Tang L. (Sun R., Qi X.)
0–5	46:03 – Zhang M.

10 min
Penalties
6 min
9
Shots
43

11 November 2012; 15:00	Netherlands	1–2 (0–0, 1–0, 0–2)	Great Britain	S.U.S. Sport Complex; Attendance: 170

Game reference

Claudia van Leeuwen
Goalies
Nicole Jackson
Referee:
(United States) Erin Blair
Linesmen:
(United States) Michaela Frattarelli
(China) Wang Hui

M. de Jong (J. Zwarthoed) – 29:53	1–0
	1–1	45:47 – L. Wilkinson (N. Davies, G. Farman)
	1–2	55:54 – K. Henry (SH)

10 min
Penalties
16 min
33
Shots
34

11 November 2012; 19:00	China	4–3 GWS (0–3, 2–0, 1–0) (OT: 0–0) (SO: 1–0)	France	S.U.S. Sport Complex; Attendance: 467

Game reference

Shi Yao
Jia Dandan
Goalies
Caroline Baldin
Referee:
(Canada) Genevieve Bordeleau
Linesmen:
(Japan) Chieko Inoue
(Canada) Lacey Senuk

	0–1	03:22 – E. Passard (G. Gendarme) (PP)
	0–2	11:28 – B. Jouanny (M. Allemoz) (PP)
	0–3	15:02 – M. Allemoz (S. Fohrer, L. Baudrit)
Jin F. (Qi X., Sun R.) (PP) – 20:46	1–3
Sun R. (Jiang N.) (PP) – 21:35	2–3
Tang L. (Sun R.) – 58:21	3–3

Hui C. (miss)
Yu B.
Sun R.
Shootout
(miss) M. Allemoz
(miss) L. Escudero
6 min
Penalties
10 min
40
Shots
26

=== Group F ===
Team	GP	W	OTW	OTL	L	GF	GA	DIF	PTS
Denmark	3	3	0	0	0	8	2	+6	9
Austria	3	2	0	0	1	10	3	+7	6
Italy	3	1	0	0	2	4	10	−6	3
Latvia	3	0	0	0	3	3	10	−7	0

All times are local (UTC+2).

8 November 2012; 15:30	Austria	7–0 (1–0, 2–0, 4–0)	Italy	Vidzeme Olimpic Centre Ice Arena; Attendance: 89

Game reference

Paula Marchhart
Theresa Hornich
Goalies
Giulia Mazzocchi
Rita Flor
Referee:
(Finland) Kaisa Ketonen
Linesmen:
(Sweden) Linn Forsberg
(Norway) Marlen Hansen

J. Weber (D. Altmann, M. Brunner) (PP) – 19:24	1–0
J. Weber (C. Wittich, T. Grascher) (PP) – 33:40	2–0
A. Meixner (E.M. Verworner, V. Hummel) – 38:27	3–0
D. Altmann (PP) – 40:13	4–0
J. Willenshofer (E.M. Schwarzler) – 45:39	5–0
E.M. Schwarzler (V. Hummel, J. Willenshofer) – 49:18	6–0
D. Altmann (E.M. Verworner) – 56:03	7–0

8 min
Penalties
10 min
36
Shots
27

8 November 2012; 19:30	Latvia	1–4 (0–1, 0–2, 1–1)	Denmark	Vidzeme Olimpic Centre Ice Arena; Attendance: 368

Game reference

Evija Tētiņa
Goalies
Kamilla Lund Nielsen
Referee:
(Czech Republic) Radka Ruzickova
Linesmen:
(Estonia) Kaire Leet
(Czech Republic) Ilona Novotná

	0–1	02:52 – S. Jacquet (J. Jakobsen)
	0–2	24:27 – A. Clausen
	0–3	24:59 – J. Gregersen (M. Frandsen)
I. Pētersone (L. Hartmane) – 45:07	1–3
	1–4	53:04 – N. Jensen (J. Jakobsen)

4 min
Penalties
6 min
21
Shots
46

9 November 2012; 15:30	Austria	0–1 (0–0, 0–1, 0-0)	Denmark	Vidzeme Olimpic Centre Ice Arena; Attendance: 76

Game reference
Paula Marchhart	Goalies	Kamilla Lund Nielsen; Amalie Joa	Referee: (Germany) Katja Bandlofsky; Linesmen: (Norway) Marlen Hansen (Czech Republic) Ilona Novotná
0–1 / 35:30 – H. Ostergaard (SH)			Referee: (Germany) Katja Bandlofsky; Linesmen: (Norway) Marlen Hansen (Czech Republic) Ilona Novotná
8 min	Penalties	12 min	Referee: (Germany) Katja Bandlofsky; Linesmen: (Norway) Marlen Hansen (Czech Republic) Ilona Novotná
31	Shots	21	Referee: (Germany) Katja Bandlofsky; Linesmen: (Norway) Marlen Hansen (Czech Republic) Ilona Novotná

9 November 2012; 19:30	Italy	3–0 (1–0, 2–0, 0–0)	Latvia	Vidzeme Olimpic Centre Ice Arena; Attendance: 89

Game reference

Giulia Mazzocchi
Goalies
Evija Tētiņa
Referee:
(Finland) Kaisa Ketonen
Linesmen:
(Estonia) Kaire Leet
(Kazakhstan) Oksana Shestakova

M. Campo (da Rugna, H. Elliscasis) – 17:20	1–0
B. Larger – 22:32	2–0
E. Dalpra (C. Saletta, V. Bettarini) – 22:51	3–0

16 min
Penalties
10 min
28
Shots
26

11 November 2012; 13:00	Denmark	3–1 (0–1, 3–0, 0–0)	Italy	Vidzeme Olimpic Centre Ice Arena; Attendance: 72

Game reference

Kamilla Nielsen
Goalies
Giulia Mazzocchi
Referee:
(Czech Republic) Radka Ruzickova
Linesmen:
(Norway) Marlen Hansen
(Kazakhstan) Oksana Shestakova

	0–1	11:01 – A. Tartaglione
J. Persson (S. Jacquet) – 21:20	1–1
M. Olausson (M. Frandsen) – 21:44	2–1
J. Persson (N. Jensen) – 33:24	3–1

16 min
Penalties
18 min
15
Shots
28

11 November 2012; 17:00	Latvia	2–3 (0–1, 1–2, 1–0)	Austria	Vidzeme Olimpic Centre Ice Arena; Attendance: 173

Game reference

Evija Tētiņa
Goalies
Paula Marchhart
Referee:
(Germany) Katja Bandlofsky
Linesmen:
(Sweden) Linn Forsberg
(Czech Republic) Ilona Novotná

	0–1	05:11 – D. Altmann (S. Ban, T. Grascher)
	0–2	28:21 – D. Altmann (E. Kantor) (PP)
	0–3	28:53 – E. Kantor (E-M. Verworner) (PP)
I. Koka (I. Geca-Miljone) – 30:09	1–3
I. Pētersone (I. Koka, I. Geca-Miljone) – 48:33	2–3

22 min
Penalties
8 min
18
Shots
40

== Final qualification ==
The two pre-qualification winners joined the nations ranked seventh through twelfth, to determine the final two olympic qualifiers. Two round robins were played from 7–10 February 2013 in Poprad and Weiden. The winners of each group qualified for the olympics.

=== Group C ===
Team	GP	W	OTW	OTL	L	GF	GA	DIF	PTS
Japan	3	2	0	1	0	9	4	+5	7
Denmark	3	1	1	0	1	4	7	−3	5
Norway	3	1	0	1	1	9	9	0	4
Slovakia	3	0	1	0	2	5	7	−2	2

All times are local (UTC+1).

7 February 2013; 14:00	Norway	3–4 (1–0, 2–1, 0–3)	Japan	Poprad Ice Stadium; Attendance: 314

Game reference

Christine Smestad
Goalies
Azusa Nakaoku
Referee:
(Germany) Nicole Hertrich
Linesmen:
(Slovakia) Katarina Janíková
(Slovakia) Michaela Kúdelová

B. Lersbryggen (M. Hansen) (PP) – 18:16	1–0
L. Bialik – 22:20	2–0
I. Farstad (L. Bialik, H. Martinsen) – 28:30	3–0
	3–1	32:12 – K. Aoki (C. Osawa, M. Shishiuchi) (PP)
	3–2	49:17 – C. Osawa
	3–3	50:59 – A. Nakamura (H. Kubo, S. Koike)
	3–4	57:13 – T. Sakagami (T. Yamane) (PP)

10 min
Penalties
12 min
28
Shots
35

7 February 2013; 18:00	Slovakia	1–2 (1–2, 0–0, 0–0)	Denmark	Poprad Ice Stadium; Attendance: 981

Game reference

Zuzana Tomčíková
Goalies
Kamilla Lund Nielsen
Referee:
(United States) Dina Allen
Linesmen:
(Russia) Olga Steinberg
(Finland) Johanna Tauriainen

J. Čulíková (M. Veličková) – 00:53	1–0
	1–1	03:35 – J. Persson
	1–2	11:56 – C. Densing (J. Jakobsen) (PP)

14 min
Penalties
8 min
21
Shots
39

8 February 2013; 14:00	Norway	1–2 GWS (0–0, 1–0, 0–1) (OT 0–0) (SO: 0–1)	Denmark	Poprad Ice Stadium; Attendance: 367

Game reference
Jorid Dagfinrud	Goalies	Kamilla Lund Nielsen	Referee: (Finland) Paivi Laurla; Linesmen: (Slovakia) Katarina Janíková (Russia) Olga Steinberg
I. Morset (L. Bialik, A. Dalen) – 33:35 / 1–0; / 1–1 / 44:41 – E. Russell (J. Jakobsen, H. Ostergaard)			Referee: (Finland) Paivi Laurla; Linesmen: (Slovakia) Katarina Janíková (Russia) Olga Steinberg
A. Dalen (miss); L. Bialik (miss); B. Lersbryggen (miss)	Shootout	(miss) J. Jakobsen; J. Gregersen; (miss) E. Russell	Referee: (Finland) Paivi Laurla; Linesmen: (Slovakia) Katarina Janíková (Russia) Olga Steinberg
6 min	Penalties	8 min	Referee: (Finland) Paivi Laurla; Linesmen: (Slovakia) Katarina Janíková (Russia) Olga Steinberg
42	Shots	20	Referee: (Finland) Paivi Laurla; Linesmen: (Slovakia) Katarina Janíková (Russia) Olga Steinberg

8 February 2013; 18:00	Japan	0–1 GWS (0–0, 0–0, 0–0) (OT 0–0) (SO: 0–1)	Slovakia	Poprad Ice Stadium; Attendance: 1,183

Game reference
Azusa Nakaoku	Goalies	Zuzana Tomčíková	Referee: (United States) Dina Allen; Linesmen: (Sweden) Karolin Strom (Finland) Johanna Tauriainen
C. Osawa (miss); R. Ukita (miss); H. Kubo (miss); T. Sakagami (miss)	Shootout	(miss) M. Veličková; (miss) J. Kapustová; (miss) J. Čulíková; J. Kapustová	Referee: (United States) Dina Allen; Linesmen: (Sweden) Karolin Strom (Finland) Johanna Tauriainen
8 min	Penalties	6 min	Referee: (United States) Dina Allen; Linesmen: (Sweden) Karolin Strom (Finland) Johanna Tauriainen
62	Shots	16	Referee: (United States) Dina Allen; Linesmen: (Sweden) Karolin Strom (Finland) Johanna Tauriainen

10 February 2013; 14:00	Denmark	0–5 (0–2, 0–2, 0–1)	Japan	Poprad Ice Stadium; Attendance: 315

Game reference

Kamilla Lund Nielsen
Goalies
Azusa Nakaoku
Referee:
(Germany) Nicole Hertrich
Linesmen:
(Slovakia) Michaela Kúdelová
(Finland) Johanna Tauriainen

0–1	09:07 – M. Shishiuchi (Y. Hirano, K. Aoki) (PP)
0–2	18:36 – H. Kubo (Y. Hirano)
0–3	27:22 – Y. Hirano (H. Kubo, A. Nakamura)
0–4	39:57 – H. Kubo (T. Sakagami, Y. Hirano)
0–5	50:53 – S. Koike (H. Kubo, T. Sakagami) (PP)

8 min
Penalties
8 min
20
Shots
34

10 February 2013; 18:00	Slovakia	3–5 (0–3, 3–1, 0–1)	Norway	Poprad Ice Stadium; Attendance: 943

Game reference

Zuzana Tomčíková
Goalies
Jorid Dagfinrud
Referee:
(Finland) Paivi Laurla
Linesmen:
(Russia) Olga Steinberg
(Sweden) Karolin Strom

	0–1	09:41 – H. Ask (H. Sletbak, M. Henriksen)
	0–2	11:43 – H. Sletbak (S. Holos, M. Carlsson)
	0–3	17:34 – A. Dalen (S. Holos)
J. Kapustová (D. Lalíková) – 21:38	1–3
J. Čulíková (J. Kapustová) – 23:32	2–3
J. Kapustová (SH) – 29:04	3–3
	3–4	32:53 – H. Martinsen (H. Ask) (PP)
	3–5	49:07 – L. Bialik (A. Dalen, S. Holos) (PP)

6 min
Penalties
12 min
23
Shots
47

=== Group D ===
Team	GP	W	OTW	OTL	L	GF	GA	DIF	PTS
Germany	3	3	0	0	0	11	2	+9	9
Czech Republic	3	1	1	0	1	9	6	+3	5
China	3	1	0	1	1	5	7	−2	4
Kazakhstan	3	0	0	0	3	2	12	−10	0

All times are local (UTC+1).

7 February 2013; 16:00	Kazakhstan	1–5 (0–3, 1–1, 0–1)	Czech Republic	Weiden Arena; Attendance: 300

Game reference

Daria Obydennova
Goalies
Radka Lhotská
Referee:
(France) Marie Picavet
Linesmen:
(Finland) Jenni Heikkinen
(Germany) Natalie Mauelshagen

	0–1	03:23 – K. Mrázová (P. Herzigová, K. Chmelová)
	0–2	07:38 – A. Lédlová (K. Chmelová) (PP)
	0–3	09:03 – K. Chmelová (L. Manhartová) (SH)
T. Koroleva – 36:27	1–3
	1–4	38:41 – D. Křížová
	1–5	45:30 – A. Polenská (P. Herzigová, P. Horálková)

6 min
Penalties
6 min
16
Shots
45

7 February 2013; 19:30	Germany	3–1 (1–0, 0–1, 2–0)	China	Weiden Arena; Attendance: 485

Game reference

Viona Harrer
Goalies
Shi Yao
Referee:
(United Kingdom) Joy Tottman
Linesmen:
(United States) Alicia Hanrahan
(Netherlands) Senovwa Mollen

J. Zorn (F. Busch, A. Lanzl) (PP) – 10:52	1–0
	1–1	30:24 – Sun R. (Jin F., Zhang B.) (PP)
T. Eisenschmid (M. Anwander) – 48:41	2–1
J. Zorn (A. Lanzl, F. Busch) – 56:14	3–1

12 min
Penalties
8 min
32
Shots
19

8 February 2013; 16:00	Kazakhstan	1–2 (0–0, 1–2, 0–0)	China	Weiden Arena; Attendance: 215

Game reference

Daria Obydennova
Goalies
Jia Dandan
Referee:
(Norway) Aina Hove
Linesmen:
(Germany) Natalie Mauelshagen
(Germany) Svenja Strohmenger

	0–1	20:42 – Zhang B. (Zhang M., Kong M.)
	0–2	24:23 – Sun R. (SH)
G. Shu (L. Ibragimova, Z. Tukhtieva) – 30:48	1–2

10 min
Penalties
4 min
23
Shots
20

8 February 2013; 19:30	Czech Republic	1–3 (1–1, 0–2, 0–0)	Germany	Weiden Arena; Attendance: 1,104

Game reference

Radka Lhotská
Goalies
Viona Harrer
Referee:
(France) Marie Picavet
Linesmen:
(Finland) Jenni Heikkinen
(Netherlands) Senovwa Mollen

	0–1	05:46 – T. Eisenschmid (M. Anwander)
A. Lédlová (L. Manhartová) (PP) – 07:51	1–1
	1–2	27:51 – S. Gotz (S. Fellner) (PP)
	1–3	29:20 – M. Anwander (M. Bittner) (PP)

12 min
Penalties
8 min
25
Shots
23

10 February 2013; 14:00	China	2–3 GWS (0–1, 0–0, 2–1) (OT 0–0) (SO: 0–1)	Czech Republic	Weiden Arena; Attendance: 175

Game reference

Jia Dandan
Goalies
Radka Lhotská
Referee:
(United Kingdom) Joy Tottman
Linesmen:
(Netherlands) Senovwa Mollen
(Germany) Svenja Strohmenger

	0–1	06:30 – A. Lédlová (L. Manhartová, K. Chmelová)
	0–2	43:22 – S. Studentová (D. Křížová)
Fang X. – 50:13	1–2
Jin F. (Fang X.) – 55:53	2–2

Yu B. (miss)
Sun R.
Qi X. (miss)
Sun R. (miss)
Shootout
P. Herzigová
(miss) K. Mrázová
(miss) S. Nováková
K. Chmelová
8 min
Penalties
12 min
13
Shots
42

10 February 2013; 17:30	Germany	5–0 (1–0, 2–0, 2–0)	Kazakhstan	Weiden Arena; Attendance: 750

Game reference

Jennifer Harß
Ivonne Schroder
Goalies
Daria Obydennova
Referee:
(Norway) Aina Hove
Linesmen:
(United States) Alicia Hanrahan
(Finland) Jenni Heikkinen

N. Kamenik (R. Richter) – 06:50	1–0
N. Kamenik (L. Schuster) – 20:50	2–0
S. Kratzer (S. Fellner, S. Gotz) (PP2) – 33:48	3–0
A. Lanzl (F. Busch, S. Gotz) – 52:21	4–0
A. Lanzl (M. Bittner) (PP) – 58:25	5–0

0 min
Penalties
10 min
50
Shots
10
