= Malene Frandsen =

Danish ice hockey player (born 1995)

- Born: 25 October 1996 (age 29) Kastrup, Denmark
- Height: 178 cm (5 ft 10 in)
- Weight: 67 kg (148 lb; 10 st 8 lb)
- Position: Defense
- Shoots: Left
- Damettan team Former teams: Malmö Redhawks; Göteborg HC; Hvidovre IK
- National team: Denmark
- Playing career: 2006–present

Malene Clarin Frandsen (born 25 October 1995) is a Danish ice hockey defenseman, currently playing in the Swedish Damettan with the Malmö Redhawks Dam.

== Playing career ==
Frandsen debuted with Hvidovre IK in the DM i ishockey for kvinder, the top-tier national league in Denmark, at age 11 and went on to play with Hvidovre IK in the Elite Women's Hockey League (EWHL) and with Göteborg HC in the Swedish Women's Hockey League (SDHL). Since 2018, she has played with the women's team of the Malmö Redhawks, serving as team captain in the 2020–21 and 2021–22 seasons.

In 2016, she was named the Danish Women's Player of the Year by the Danish Ice Hockey Union.

=== International play ===
Frandsen was a member of the Danish national ice hockey team during 2011 to 2022, and represented Denmark at nine IIHF Women's World Championships, including at the Top Division tournament of the 2021 IIHF Women's World Championship. She scored Denmark's first-ever goal at the Olympics during the women's ice hockey tournament at the 2022 Winter Olympics in Beijing.
