= Lauren Wilkinson =

Lauren Wilkinson may refer to:

- Lauren Wilkinson (rower) (born 1989), Canadian rower
- Lauren Wilkinson (ice hockey) (born 1989), British ice hockey player
- Lauren Wilkinson (writer), American fiction writer
