= Kristine Melberg Hansen =

Danish ice hockey player

- Born: 28 December 2000 (age 25) Copenhagen, Denmark
- Height: 169 cm (5 ft 7 in)
- Weight: 69 kg (152 lb; 10 st 12 lb)
- Position: Defense
- Shoots: Left
- Damettan team Former teams: Malmö Redhawks; Herlev IK
- National team: Denmark
- Playing career: 2014–present

Kristine Melberg Hansen (born 28 December 2000) is a Danish ice hockey player and member of the Danish national ice hockey team, currently playing with the Malmö Redhawks Dam of the Swedish Damettan.

Melberg Hansen represented Denmark in the Division I Group A tournaments of the IIHF Women's World Championship in 2017 and 2019, and at the Top Division tournament in 2021. As a junior player with the Danish national under-18 team, she participated in the Division I Qualification tournament of the IIHF Women's U18 World Championship in 2015 and the Division I Group B tournaments in 2017 and 2018.
