= Andrea Lanzl =

German ice hockey player

- Born: 8 October 1987 (age 38) Starnberg, West Germany
- Height: 1.63 m (5 ft 4 in)
- Weight: 64 kg (141 lb; 10 st 1 lb)
- Position: Forward
- Shoots: Left
- DFEL team Former teams: ERC Ingolstadt; EC Bergkamen; ESC Planegg; Linköpings HC
- National team: Germany
- Playing career: 2004–present

Andrea Lanzl (born 8 October 1987) is a German ice hockey player for ERC Ingolstadt and the German national team. In February 2020, she surpassed Udo Kiessling to become the all-time leader in international appearances among German national team players (both male and female).

She participated at the 2015 IIHF Women's World Championship.

== International career ==
Lanzl was selected for the Germany women's national ice hockey team in the 2006 and 2014 Winter Olympics. In 2006, she did not record a point in five games. In 2014, she recorded one assist.

Lanzl also played for Germany in the qualifying event for the 2014 Winter Olympics, and the 2010 Olympics

As of 2014, Lanzl has also appeared for Germany at seven IIHF Women's World Championships. Her first appearance came in 2005.

== Career statistics ==
Through 2013–14 season

Year	Team	Event	GP	G	A	Pts	PIM
2005	Germany	WW	5	0	0	0	2
2006	Germany	Oly	5	0	0	0	4
2007	Germany	WW	4	1	0	1	4
2008	Germany	WW	4	0	2	2	4
2008	Germany	OlyQ	3	2	0	2	0
2009	Germany	WW DI	5	0	4	4	6
2011	Germany	WW DI	4	1	1	2	2
2012	Germany	WW	5	0	1	1	2
2013	Germany	OlyQ	3	2	2	4	2
2013	Germany	WW	5	1	0	1	2
2014	Germany	Oly	5	0	1	1	0
