= Emma Russell (ice hockey) =

Danish ice hockey player (born 1995)

- Born: 18 August 1995 (age 31)
- Height: 168 cm (5 ft 6 in)
- Weight: 63 kg (139 lb; 9 st 13 lb)
- Position: Wing
- Shoots: Right
- DM team Former teams: Rødovre Mighty Bulls; Herlev IK; IC Gentofte
- National team: Denmark
- Playing career: 2011–present

Emma Elizabeth Russell (born 18 August 1995) is a Danish ice hockey player and member of the Danish national ice hockey team, currently playing with the Rødovre Mighty Bulls Q of the KvindeLigaen (DM i ishockey for kvinder).

Russell has represented Denmark at seven IIHF Women's World Championships: the Top Division tournament in 2021, the Division I Group A tournaments in 2013, 2014, 2015, 2016, and 2017, and the Group B tournament in 2012.
