= Mia Bau Hansen =

Danish ice hockey player (born 1995)

- Born: 22 June 1995 (age 31) Rødovre, Denmark
- Height: 171 cm (5 ft 7 in)
- Weight: 70 kg (154 lb; 11 st 0 lb)
- Position: Left wing
- Shoots: Left
- Damettan team Former teams: Malmö Redhawks; Göteborg HC; Hvidovre IK
- National team: Denmark
- Playing career: 2013–present

Mia Bau Hansen (born 22 June 1995) is a Danish ice hockey player and member of the Danish national ice hockey team, currently playing with the Malmö Redhawks Dam of the Swedish Damettan.

Bau Hansen made her debut with the Danish national team at the Division I A tournament of the IIHF Women's World Championship in 2017 and participated in the following Division I A tournaments in 2018 and 2019. She was a part of the Danish roster in the 2021 IIHF Women's World Championship, Denmark's first Top Division tournament since 1992, and in the Olympic qualification for the women's ice hockey tournament at the 2022 Winter Olympics, at which Denmark qualified to participate in the Olympic Games for the first time in team history.
