= Maria Holm Peters =

Danish ice hockey player (born 1999)

- Born: 16 September 1999 (age 27) Odense, Denmark
- Height: 167 cm (5 ft 6 in)
- Weight: 59 kg (130 lb; 9 st 4 lb)
- Position: Left wing
- Shoots: Left
- DM team Former teams: Odense IK; Leksands IF
- National team: Denmark
- Playing career: 2013–present

Maria Holm Peters (born 16 September 1999) is a Danish ice hockey player and member of the Danish national ice hockey team, currently playing with the Odense IK Kvinder of the KvindeLigaen (DM i ishockey for kvinder, 'Danish Championship in ice hockey for women').

Holm Peters represented Denmark at the IIHF Women's World Championship Division I Group A tournaments in 2016, 2017, 2018, and 2019, and at the Top Division tournament in 2021. She tallied her first senior national team goal at the qualification tournament for the 2022 Winter Olympics, scoring the game winner in a match against Austria. As a junior player with the Danish national under-18 team, she participated in the Division I Qualification tournament of the IIHF Women's U18 World Championship in 2015, the Division I tournament in 2016, and the Division I Group B tournaments in 2017 and 2018.
