= Cassandra Repstock-Romme =

Danish ice hockey goaltender

- Born: 26 August 2001 (age 24) Hellerup, Denmark
- Height: 171 cm (5 ft 7 in)
- Weight: 72 kg (159 lb; 11 st 5 lb)
- Position: Goaltender
- Caught: Left
- Played for: Herlev IK; IC Gentofte; Hvidovre IK
- National team: Denmark
- Playing career: 2014–2022

Cassandra Repstock-Romme (born 26 August 2001) is a Danish retired ice hockey goaltender.

Repstock-Romme represented Denmark in the Division I Group A tournaments of the IIHF Women's World Championship in 2018 and 2019, and at the Top Division tournament in 2021. At the 2021 tournament, she maintained an excellent .926 save percentage and was selected as a top three player on the team by the coaching staff. As a junior player with the Danish national under-18 team, she participated in the 2016 IIHF World Women's U18 Championship – Division I and the 2017 IIHF World Women's U18 Championship – Division I Group B.

In November 2022, she announced her retirement.

== Career statistics ==
=== International ===
Note: GP = Games played; Min, TOI = Minutes played; W = Wins; L = Losses; T,T/OT = Ties; OTL = Overtime losses; GA = Goals-against; GAA = Goals-against average; SO = Shutouts; SV% = Save percentage;

				Regular season
Year	Team	Event	Result	GP	W	L	T/OT	MIN	GA	SO	GAA	SV%
2022	Denmark	OG	10th	4	1	3	0	191:44	9	0	2.82	0.905
