= Josephine Asperup =

Danish ice hockey player (born 1992)

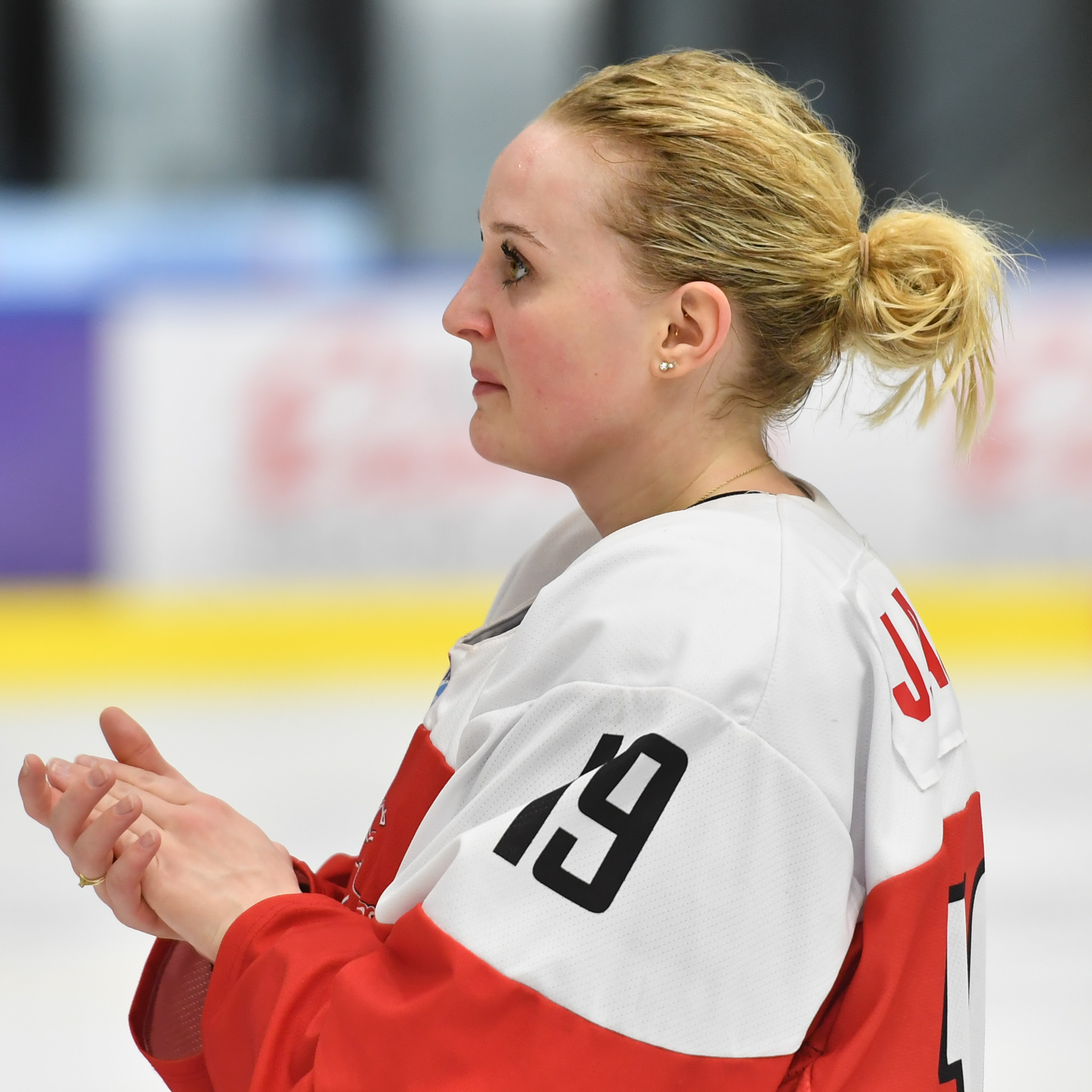
- Asperup representing Denmark at the 2017 IIHF World Championship D1A tournament
- Born: 21 July 1992 (age 34) Søborg, Denmark
- Height: 163 cm (5 ft 4 in)
- Weight: 60 kg (132 lb; 9 st 6 lb)
- Position: Defense
- Shoots: Left
- SDHL team Former teams: Linköping HC: Malmö Redhawks; Luleå HF/MSSK; Djurgårdens IF; Hvidovre IK; AIK IF; Segeltorps IF; Herlev IK; Rødovre SIK
- National team: Denmark
- Playing career: 2005–present

Josephine Asperup (born 21 July 1992) is a Danish ice hockey defenseman and member of the Danish national ice hockey team, currently playing in the Swedish Women's Hockey League (SDHL) with Linköping HC.

Asperup represented Denmark in the women's ice hockey tournament at the 2022 Winter Olympics in Beijing and at twelve IIHF Women's World Championships, including at the Top Division tournaments in 2021 and 2022.

== Playing career ==
Her club career began when she debuted in the DM i ishockey for kvinder at age 13 and has been played in elite leagues in Denmark and Sweden, and in the Elite Women's Hockey League (EWHL).

== Personal life ==
Asperup's younger brother, Matthias, is also an ice hockey player – a winger – and a member of the Danish national team.

== Career statistics ==
=== Regular season and playoffs ===
Note: Riksserien rebranded as SDHL in 2016. Damettan was reconfigured into the Nationella Damhockeyligan (NDHL) in 2021.

			Regular season					Playoffs
Season	Team	League	GP	G	A	Pts	PIM	GP	G	A	Pts	PIM
2005–06	Rødovre SIK	DM i ishockey	9	5	3	8	8	2	0	0	0	0
2006–07	Rødovre SIK	DM i ishockey	9	2	3	5	2	3	0	2	2	6
2007–08	Rødovre SIK	DM i ishockey	10	3	2	5	2	–	–	–	–	–
2008–09	Herlev IK	DM i ishockey	12	2	10	12	6	3	0	2	2	6
2008–09	Herlev IK U17	Denmark U17	5	0	3	3	2	–	–	–	–	–
2009–10	Herlev IK	DM i ishockey	20	14	19	33	12	3	0	0	0	6
2009–10	Herlev IK U17	Denmark U17	19	5	7	12	7	–	–	–	–	–
2010–11	Segeltorps IF	Riksserien	16	0	0	0	6	2	0	0	0	0
2011–12	AIK IF	Riksserien	13	1	1	2	0	2	0	0	0	0
2012–13	Hvidovre IK	DM i ishockey	16	5	31	36	16	5	1	8	9	2
2013–14	Hvidovre IK	DM i ishockey	13	17	21	38	24	8	6	4	10	16
2013–14	Hvidovre IK Fighters	DM i ishockey	6	8	5	13	18	–	–	–	–	–
2014–15	Hvidovre IK	DM i ishockey	15	15	8	23	20	7	6	4	10	16
2015–16	Hvidovre IK	DM i ishockey	10	11	12	23	10	7	6	3	9	0
2015–16	Hvidovre IK Fighters	Damettan	8	9	7	16	8	–	–	–	–	–
2016–17	Hvidovre IK	DM i ishockey	4	2	4	6	4	7	8	7	15	8
2017–18	Hvidovre IK	DM i ishockey	4	5	4	9	0	6	9	6	15	18
2017–18	Hvidovre IK	Damettan	15	20	15	35	22	–	–	–	–	–
2017–18	Hvidovre IK	EWHL	12	5	8	13	18	–	–	–	–	–
2018–19	Malmö Redhawks	Damettan	15	8	11	19	10	–	–	–	–	–
2018–19	Linköping HC	SDHL	–	–	–	–	–	12	0	1	1	0
2019–20	Djurgårdens IF	SDHL	4	0	0	0	2	–	–	–	–	–
2019–20	Luleå HF (L)	SDHL	5	0	0	0	4	–	–	–	–	–
2019–20	Malmö Redhawks	Damettan	16	3	9	12	8	6	0	3	3	4
2020–21	Malmö Redhawks	Damettan	5	2	5	7	0	–	–	–	–	–
2021–22	Malmö Redhawks	NDHL	15	10	26	36	24	6	2	8	10	8
2021–22	Djurgårdens IF (L)	SDHL	4	0	0	0	2	–	–	–	–	—
2022–23	Linköping HC	SDHL	24	1	3	4	10	2	0	0	0	6
DM i ishockey for kvinder totals			126	89	122	211	122	50	30	37	67	68
SDHL totals			75	3	5	8	26	18	0	1	1	6
NDHL totals			82	56	90	146	90	12	2	11	13	14

=== International ===
Year	Team	Event	Result	GP	G	A	Pts	PIM
2009	Denmark	WW D2	5th	5	0	0	0	4
2011	Denmark	WW D2	3rd	4	0	1	1	8
2012	Denmark	WW D1B	1st	5	0	8	8	8
2013	Denmark	OGQ	DNQ	9	0	2	2	6
2014	Denmark	WW D1A	2nd	5	1	2	3	2
2015	Denmark	WW D1A	4th	5	0	1	1	6
2016	Denmark	WW D1A	4th	5	0	3	3	0
2017	Denmark	WW D1A	4th	5	0	1	1	8
2017	Denmark	OGQ	DNQ	3	0	1	1	8
2018	Denmark	WW D1A	4th	5	0	1	1	2
2019	Denmark	WW D1A	2nd	5	1	1	2	6
2021	Denmark	WW	10th	4	0	0	0	4
2021	Denmark	OGQ	Q	3	0	2	2	0
2022	Denmark	OG	10th	4	0	0	0	8
2022	Denmark	WW	10th	4	0	1	1	2
2023	Denmark	WW D1A	2nd	5	0	0	0	6
Totals				61	2	19	21	64
