= Danish Ice Hockey Union =

Governing body of ice hockey in Denmark

Denmark
- Association name: Danmarks Ishockey Union
- IIHF Code: DEN
- Founded: 27 November 1949
- IIHF membership: 27 April 1946
- President: Henrik Bach Nielsen
- IIHF men's ranking: 10 (▼1) (3 June 2026)
- IIHF women's ranking: 10 (21 April 2025)

Danmarks Ishockey Union ('The Danish Ice Hockey Union') or DIU is the governing body of ice hockey in Denmark. It is a member of the National Olympic Committee and Sports Confederation of Denmark (DIF) and the International Ice Hockey Federation (IIHF). The association was founded on 27 November 1949 and became a member of the International Ice Hockey Federation the same year.

The union is responsible for all of Denmark's national ice hockey teams and organizes the Metal Ligaen, KvindeLigaen, and the other ice hockey leagues and tournaments in Denmark.

On 1 June 2014, seventeen ice hockey clubs and 4,252 players were registered with the DIU.

== National teams ==
- Denmark men's national ice hockey team
- Denmark women's national ice hockey team
- Denmark men's national junior ice hockey team
- Denmark men's national under-18 ice hockey team
- Denmark women's national under-18 ice hockey team
