= Lisa Jensen =

Danish ice hockey player (born 1997)

- Born: 26 February 1997 (age 29) Kastrup, Denmark
- Height: 165 cm (5 ft 5 in)
- Weight: 60 kg (132 lb; 9 st 6 lb)
- Position: Goaltender
- Catches: Left
- Damettan team Former teams: Malmö Redhawks; Hvidovre IK; Herlev IK
- National team: Denmark
- Playing career: 2013–present

Lisa Sellberg Jensen (born 26 February 1997) is a Danish ice hockey goaltender and member of the Danish national ice hockey team, currently playing with the Malmö Redhawks Dam of the Swedish Damettan.

Jensen represented Denmark in the Division I Group A tournaments of the IIHF Women's World Championship in 2014, 2016, 2017, 2018 and 2019, and in the Top Division tournament in 2021. As a junior player with the Danish national under-18 team, she participated in the 2015 IIHF World Women's U18 Championship – Division I.

== Career statistics ==
=== International ===
Note: GP = Games played; Min, TOI = Minutes played; W = Wins; L = Losses; T,T/OT = Ties; OTL = Overtime losses; GA = Goals-against; GAA = Goals-against average; SO = Shutouts; SV% = Save percentage;

				Regular season
Year	Team	Event	Result	GP	W	L	T/OT	MIN	GA	SO	GAA	SV%
2022	Denmark	OG	10th	1	0	1	0	60:00	9	0	3.00	0.900
