= Mille Kunnerup Sørensen =

Danish ice hockey player

- Born: 17 December 2001 (age 24) Kjellerup, Denmark
- Height: 155 cm (5 ft 1 in)
- Weight: 58 kg (128 lb; 9 st 2 lb)
- Position: Forward
- Shoots: Left
- SDHL team Former teams: AIK Hockey: Malmö Redhawks; Hvidovre IK; Silkeborg SF
- National team: Denmark
- Playing career: 2014–present

Mille Kunnerup Sørensen (born 17 December 2001) is a Danish ice hockey player and member of the Danish national team, currently playing in the Swedish Women's Hockey League (SDHL) with AIK Hockey Dam.

Kunnerup Sørensen represented Denmark at the Division I Group A tournament of the IIHF Women's World Championship in 2019 and at the Top Division tournaments in 2021 and 2022. As a junior player with the Danish national under-18 team, she participated in the IIHF Women's U18 World Championship Division I Group B tournaments in 2017 and 2018, and the Division I Group A tournament in 2019.
