= Julie Oksbjerg =

Danish ice hockey player

- Born: 2 December 2000 (age 25)
- Height: 178 cm (5 ft 10 in)
- Weight: 73 kg (161 lb; 11 st 7 lb)
- Position: Right Wing
- Shoots: Left
- DM team Former teams: Odense IK; Hvidovre IK
- National team: Denmark
- Playing career: 2013–present

Julie Oksbjerg (born 2 December 2000) is a Danish ice hockey player and member of the Danish national ice hockey team, currently playing with the Odense IK Kvinder of the KvindeLigaen (DM i ishockey for kvinder, 'Danish Championship in ice hockey for women').

Oksbjerg represented Denmark at the Division I Group A tournaments of the IIHF Women's World Championship in 2017, 2018, and 2019, and at the Top Division tournament in 2021. As a junior player with the Danish national under-18 team, she participated in the Division I Qualification tournament of the IIHF Women's U18 World Championship in 2015, the Division I tournament in 2016, and the Division I Group B tournaments in 2017 and 2018.
