= Julie Funch Østergaard =

Danish ice hockey player (born 1995)

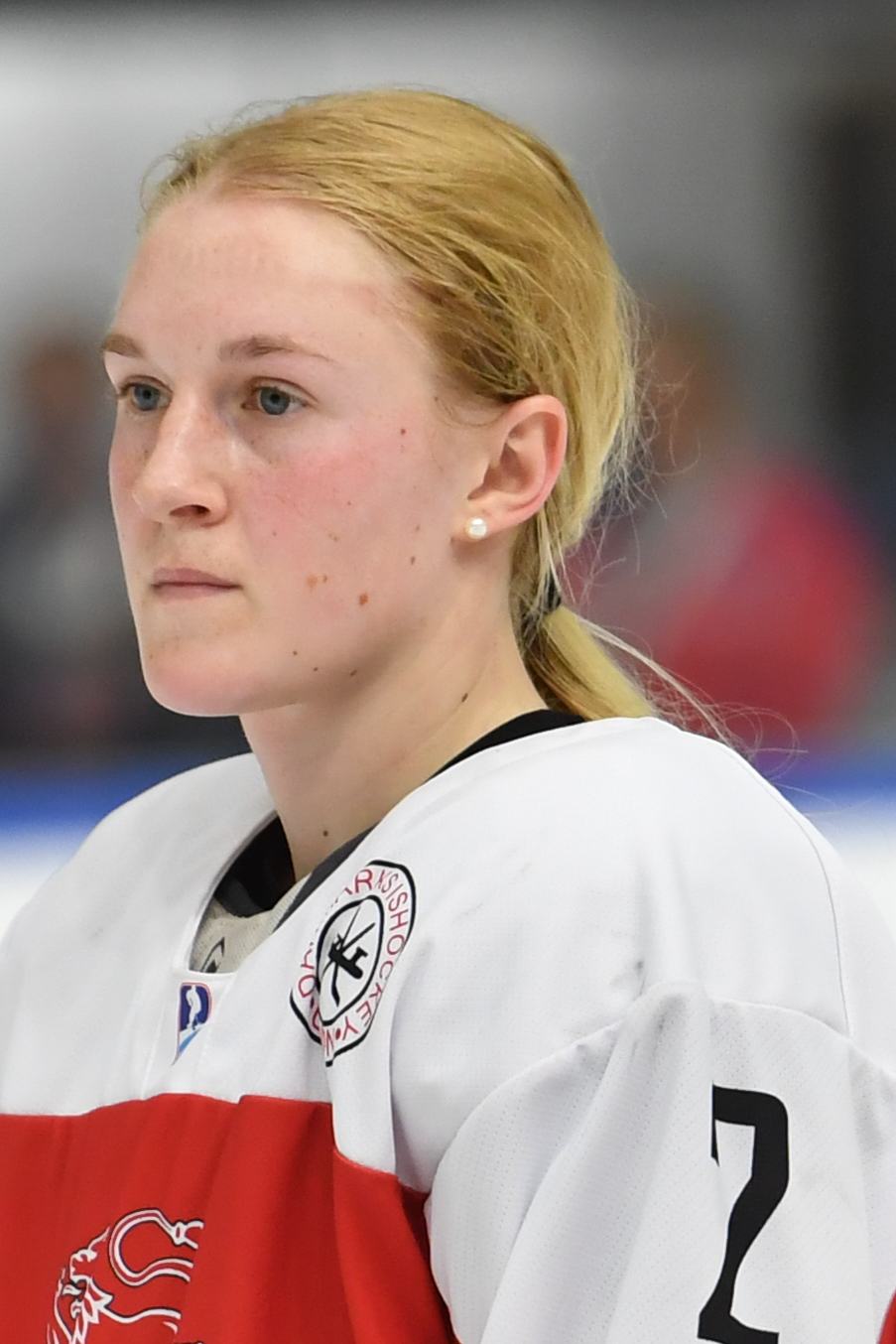
- Funch Østergaard representing Denmark at the 2017 World Championship D1A
- Born: 6 August 1995 (age 31) Copenhagen, Denmark
- Height: 169 cm (5 ft 7 in)
- Weight: 65 kg (143 lb; 10 st 3 lb)
- Position: Centre
- Shoots: Left
- DM team: Hvidovre IK
- National team: Denmark
- Playing career: 2009–present

Julie Marie Funch Østergaard née Gregersen (born 6 August 1995) is a Danish ice hockey player and member of the Danish national ice hockey team, currently playing with Hvidovre IK Kvinder of the KvindeLigaen (DM i ishockey for kvinder).

Funch Østergaard has represented Denmark at eight IIHF Women's World Championships: the Top Division tournament in 2021, the Division I Group A tournaments in 2013, 2014, 2015, 2016, 2017, and 2018, and the Group B tournament in 2012.
