= Sofia Skriver =

Danish ice hockey player

- Born: 7 June 2003 (age 21); Silkeborg, Denmark
- Height: 164 cm (5 ft 5 in)
- Weight: 63 kg (139 lb; 9 st 13 lb)
- Position: Centre
- Shoots: Left
- SDHL team Former teams: Luleå HF/MSSK; Hvidovre IK; Silkeborg SF
- National team: Denmark
- Playing career: 2014–present

Sofia Blüthgen Skriver (born 7 June 2003) is a Danish ice hockey player and member of the Danish national ice hockey team, currently playing with Luleå HF/MSSK of the Swedish Women's Hockey League (SDHL).

Skriver represented Denmark at the Division I Group A tournament of IIHF Women's World Championship in 2019 and at the Top Division tournament in 2021. She also played in the qualification tournament for the 2022 Winter Olympics, at which the Danes earned an Olympic berth for the first time. As a junior player with the Danish national under-18 team, she participated in the IIHF Women's U18 World Championship Division I Group B tournament in 2018 and the Division I Group A tournaments in 2019 and 2020.
