= Simone Jacquet Thrysøe =

Danish ice hockey player

- Born: 3 April 1987 (age 37); Aalborg, Denmark
- Height: 180 cm (5 ft 11 in)
- Weight: 72 kg (159 lb; 11 st 5 lb)
- Position: Defense
- Shoots: Left
- KvindeLigaen team Former teams: AaB Ishockey; Herning IK; Odense IK; Frederikshavn IK
- National team: Denmark
- Playing career: c. 2003–present

Simone Jacquet Thrysøe née Jacquet-Melby (born 3 April 1987) is a Danish ice hockey player and member of the Danish national ice hockey team, currently serving as captain of AaB Ishockey Damer in the KvindeLigaen.

She has represented Denmark at eleven IIHF Women's World Championships, including at the Top Division tournament of the 2021 IIHF Women's World Championship.
