= Lauren Wilkinson (ice hockey) =

British ice hockey player

- Born: 3 January 1989 (age 36)
- Height: 1.78 m (5 ft 10 in)
- Weight: 70 kg (154 lb; 11 st 0 lb)
- Position: Forward
- Shoots: Right
- WPIHL team: Kingston Diamonds
- National team: Great Britain

Lauren Wilkinson (born 3 January 1989) is a British ice hockey player. She played for the 2011 Great Britain women's national ice hockey team.
