= Silke Lave Glud =

Danish ice hockey player (born 1996)

- Born: 3 March 1996 (age 29) Hvidovre, Denmark
- Height: 175 cm (5 ft 9 in)
- Weight: 60 kg (132 lb; 9 st 6 lb)
- Position: Defense
- Shoots: Left
- KvindeLigaen team Former teams: Rødovre Mighty Bulls Q Herlev IK; Hvidovre IK; Luleå HF/MSSK
- National team: Denmark
- Playing career: 2007–present

Silke Lave Glud (born 3 March 1996) is a Danish ice hockey player and member of the Danish national ice hockey team, currently serving as captain of the Rødovre Mighty Bulls Q in the KvindeLigaen.

== Playing career ==
She has represented Denmark at seven IIHF Women's World Championships, including at the Top Division tournament of the 2021 IIHF Women's World Championship.

== Career statistics ==
=== International ===
Year	Team	Event	Result	GP	G	A	Pts	PIM
2013	Denmark	OGQ	DNQ	6	2	1	3	0
2013	Denmark	WC D1A	2nd	5	0	0	0	0
2014	Denmark	WC D1A	2nd	5	0	0	0	0
2016	Denmark	WC D1A	4th	5	2	3	5	0
2017	Denmark	WC D1A	4th	5	1	0	1	0
2017	Denmark	OGQ	DNQ	3	0	0	0	0
2018	Denmark	WC D1A	4th	5	6	3	9	0
2019	Denmark	WC D1A	2nd	5	2	4	6	2
2021	Denmark	WC	10th	4	0	0	0	0
2021	Denmark	OGQ	Q	3	1	1	2	0
Totals				46	14	12	26	2
