= Nicoline Jensen =

Danish ice hockey player (born 1992)

- Born: 8 November 1992 (age 33) Tårnby, Denmark
- Height: 165 cm (5 ft 5 in)
- Weight: 63 kg (139 lb; 9 st 13 lb)
- Position: Right wing
- Shoots: Left
- DM/NDHL team Former teams: Rødovre Mighty Bulls Q: Skellefteå AIK; HV71; Luleå HF/MSSK; Linköping HC; New Hampshire Wildcats; Castleton Spartans; Malmö Redhawks; Rødovre SIK; Amager IC
- National team: Denmark
- Playing career: 2005–present

Nicoline Søndergaard Jensen (born 8 November 1992) is a Danish ice hockey player and captain of the Danish national team. She is captain of the Rødovre Mighty Bulls Q in the Danish KvindeLigaen (DM i ishockey for kvinder) and Swedish Nationella Damhockeyligan (NDHL).

Jensen has represented Denmark at thirteen IIHF Women's World Championships, including at the Top Division tournaments in 2021 and 2022, and in the women's ice hockey tournament at the 2022 Winter Olympics in Beijing.

== Playing career ==
Her club career began when she debuted in the DM i ishockey for kvinder with the Amager Ishockey Club at age 13. She went on to play in the Swedish Damettan with the Malmö Redhawks Dam and in the United States with the Castleton Spartans women's ice hockey program in the NCAA Division III and with the New Hampshire Wildcats women's ice hockey program in the NCAA Division I. Active in the Swedish Women's Hockey League (SDHL) during 2016 to 2022, she played with Linköping HC, Luleå HF/MSSK, and HV71.
