= KvindeLigaen (ice hockey) =

Danish national championship ice hockey league

Kvindeligaen DM i ishockey for kvinder
- Sport: Ice hockey
- Founded: 1989
- Founder: Danmarks Ishockey Union
- First season: 1989–90
- COO: Claus Fonnesbech Christensen
- No. of teams: 5
- Country: Denmark
- Most recent champion: Hvidovre IK (2025–26)
- Most titles: Herlev IK (13)
- Domestic cup: Danish Cup
- International cup: EWHL Euro Cup

Kvindeligaen (lit. 'The Women's League') is the premier women's ice hockey league in Denmark. It was founded as the DM i ishockey for kvinder (lit. 'Danish Championship in ice hockey for women') in 1989 by the Danish Ice Hockey Union.

== Teams ==
=== 2026–27 season ===
Location of Kvindeligaen teams in Denmark.

Team	City	Home venue	Head coach
Copenhagen Falcons	Copenhagen	Ørestad Skøjtehal	Kyle McCann
Gentofte Stars	Gentofte	Gentofte Skøjtehal	Camilla Foss
KHA	Hvidovre	Hassenkamm Stilladser Ishockey Arena	Jonas Kellander
Odense IK	Odense	Odense Isstadion	Ulf Werner
Silkeborg SF	Silkeborg	Silkeborg Skøjtehal	René Baltzer Madsen

Source: Danish Ice Hockey Union

=== Past participants ===
- AaB Ishockey Damer, 2009–2022
- Frederikshavn Ishockey Klub (as Frederikshavn IK and Frederikshavn White Hawks)
- Gladsaxe Bears Q, –2024
- IC Gentofte, 2011–2016
- Hellerup Idræts Klub (HIK), 1989–c. 1997
- Herning IK, –2023
- Kjøbenhavns Skøjteløberforening (KSF), 2009–2014
- Rungsted Ishockey Klub (Rungsted IK)
- Silkeborg Skøjteløberforening af 1896 (Silkeborg SF)
- Århus Ishockey Klub (Århus IK)

== Champions ==
=== All-time medal count ===
	Team	1st place, gold medalist(s)	2nd place, silver medalist(s)	3rd place, bronze medalist(s)	Total
1	Herlev IK	13	13	1	27
2	Hvidovre IK	10	6	1	17
3	Rødovre SIK	6	7	3	14
4	Hellerup IK	5	2	0	7
5	Frederikshavn IK	1	1	6	8
6	Herning IK	0	1	4	5
7	Odense IK	0	0	11	11
8	Rungsted IK	0	0	2	2
9	IC Gentofte	0	0	1	1
9	KSF	0	0	1	1
9	Silkeborg SF	0	0	1	1
9	Århus IK	0	0	1	1

=== Danish Champions by season ===
Season	(gold) Champion	(silver) Runner-up	(bronze) Third place
1989–90	Hellerup IK (1)		
1990–91	Hellerup IK (2)		
1991–92	Hellerup IK (3)		
1992–93	Hellerup IK (4)		
1993–94	Hellerup IK (5)	Herlev IK	Århus IK
1994–95	Herlev IK (1)	Hellerup IK	Frederikshavn IK
1995–96	Herlev IK (2)	Hellerup IK	Frederikshavn IK
1996–97	Herlev IK (3)		
1997–98	Herlev IK (4)	Rødovre SIK	Rungsted IK
1998–99	Rødovre SIK (1)	Herlev IK	Rungsted IK
1999–2000	Rødovre SIK (2)	Herlev IK	Frederikshavn IK
2000–01	Frederikshavn IK (1)	Herlev IK	Rødovre SIK
2001–02	Herlev IK (5)	Rødovre SIK	Frederikshavn IK
2002–03	Rødovre SIK (3)	Frederikshavn IK	Herlev IK
2003–04	Herlev IK (6)	Rødovre SIK	Frederikshavn IK
2004–05	Rødovre SIK (4)	Herlev IK	Frederikshavn IK
2005–06	Herlev IK (7)	Rødovre SIK	Herning IK
2006–07	Herlev IK (8)	Rødovre SIK	Herning IK
2007–08	Herlev IK (9)	Herning IK	Hvidovre IK
2008–09	Herlev IK (10)	Hvidovre IK	Odense IK
2009–10	Herlev IK (11)	Hvidovre IK	Rødovre SIK
2010–11	Herlev IK (12)	Hvidovre IK	KSF
2011–12	Hvidovre IK (1)	Herlev IK	Odense IK
2012–13	Hvidovre IK (2)	Herlev IK	Herning IK
2013–14	Herlev IK (13)	Hvidovre IK	IC Gentofte Stars
2014–15	Hvidovre IK (3)	Herlev IK	Odense IK
2015–16	Hvidovre IK (4)	Herlev IK	Herning IK
2016–17	Hvidovre IK (5)	Herlev IK	Odense IK
2017–18	Hvidovre IK (6)	Herlev IK	Silkeborg SF
2018–19	Hvidovre IK (7)	Herlev IK	Odense IK
2019–20	Finals cancelled due to COVID-19 pandemic.		Odense IK
2020–21	Hvidovre IK (8)	Herlev IK	Odense IK
2021–22	Rødovre Mighty Bulls Q (5)	Hvidovre IK	Odense IK
2022–23	Rødovre Mighty Bulls Q (6)	Hvidovre IK	Odense IK
2023–24	Hvidovre IK (9)	Rødovre Mighty Bulls Q	Odense IK
2024–25	Hvidovre IK (10)	Rødovre Mighty Bulls Q	Odense IK
2025–26	Hvidovre IK (11)	Odense IK	Copenhagen Falcons
