= Denmark women's national ice hockey team =

Denmark
- Nickname: Danske Løver (Danish Lions)
- Association: Danmarks Ishockey Union
- General manager: Morten Green
- Head coach: Björn Edlund
- Assistants: Mikkel Ry
- Captain: Nicoline Jensen
- Most games: Josefine Jakobsen (85)
- Top scorer: Josefine Jakobsen (57)
- Most points: Josefine Jakobsen (109)
- IIHF code: DEN
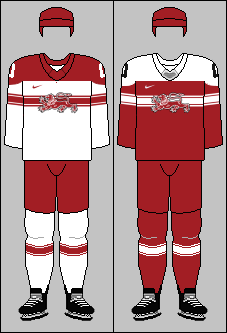

Ranking
- Current IIHF: 10 (3 June 2026)
- Highest IIHF: 10 (first in 2015)
- Lowest IIHF: 22 (2010)

First international
- Denmark 5–1 England (Lyss, Switzerland; 18 December 1987)

Biggest win
- Denmark 20–1 Croatia (Barcelona, Spain; 14 October 2012)

Biggest defeat
- Finland 18–0 Denmark (Düsseldorf, West Germany; 6 April 1989)

Olympics
- Appearances: 1 (first in 2022)

World Championship
- Appearances: 24 (first in 1992)
- Best result: 7th (1992)

European Championship
- Appearances: 3 (first in 1989)
- Best result: (bronze) (1991)

International record (W–L–T)
- 126–151–12

The Danish women's national ice hockey team (Danish: Danske ishockeylandshold for kvinder) is the women's national ice hockey team of Denmark. The team represents Denmark at the International Ice Hockey Federation's Women's World Championship and other international tournaments. The team is organized by the Danish Ice Hockey Union (Danmarks Ishockey Union, DIU).

As of 2026, Denmark had a total of 594 female players registered with the IIHF, of which 135 were youth players and 459 were senior players. In comparison, 702 female players were registered with the IIHF in 2020, and 406 players were registered in 2014.

== Tournament record ==
=== Olympic Games ===
- 2022 – Finished 10th

=== World Championship ===
- 1992 – Finished 7th
- 1999 – Finished 6th in Group B
- 2000 – Finished 4th in Group B
- 2001 – Finished 8th in Division I (relegated to Division II)
- 2003 – Finished 2nd in Division II
- 2004 – Finished 1st in Division II (promoted to Division I)
- 2005 – Finished 5th in Division I
- 2007 – Finished 6th in Division I (relegated to Division II)
- 2008 – Finished 2nd in Division II
- 2009 – Finished 5th in Division II
- 2011 – Finished 3rd in Division II
- 2012 – Finished 1st in Division IB (promoted to Division IA)
- 2013 – Finished 2nd in Division IA
- 2014 – Finished 3rd in Division IA
- 2015 – Finished 4th in Division IA
- 2016 – Finished 4th in Division IA
- 2017 – Finished 4th in Division IA
- 2018 – Finished 4th in Division IA
- 2019 – Finished 2nd in Division IA (promoted to Top Division)
- 2020 – Cancelled due to the coronavirus pandemic
- 2021 – Finished 10th
- 2022 – Finished 10th (relegated to Division IA)
- 2023 – Finished 2nd in Division IA (promoted to Top Division)
- 2024 – Finished 10th (relegated to Division IA)
- 2025 – Finished 2nd in Division IA (promoted to Top Division)
- 2026 – Finished 8th

=== European Championship ===
- 1989 – Finished 6th
- 1991 – Finished 3rd (bronze) Won Bronze Medal
- 1993 – Finished 6th (relegated to Group B)
- 1995 – Finished 2nd in Group B
- 1996 – Finished 1st in Group B

== Team ==
=== Current roster ===
Roster for the 2026 IIHF Women's World Championship.

Head coach: Björn Edlund

No.	Pos.	Name	Height	Weight	Birthdate	Team
1	G	Aya Petersen	1.78 m (5 ft 10 in)	83 kg (183 lb)	19 January 2004 (age 22)	(Sweden) Malmö Redhawks
4	F	Silke Glud	1.75 m (5 ft 9 in)	65 kg (143 lb)	3 March 1996 (age 30)	(Sweden) Malmö Redhawks
5	D	Sille Flygenring	1.70 m (5 ft 7 in)	56 kg (123 lb)	10 December 2001 (age 24)	(Denmark) Hvidovre IF
6	D	Lærke Søndergaard	1.80 m (5 ft 11 in)	82 kg (181 lb)	5 January 2004 (age 22)	(Austria) Lakers Kärnten
7	D	Freya Ekberg	1.63 m (5 ft 4 in)	60 kg (130 lb)	12 May 2009 (age 17)	(Canada) Purcell HA
9	F	Alma Madsen-Mygdal	1.67 m (5 ft 6 in)	55 kg (121 lb)	31 October 2007 (age 19)	(Denmark) Hvidovre IF
10	D	Silja Rasmussen	1.75 m (5 ft 9 in)	69 kg (152 lb)	16 February 2007 (age 19)	(Sweden) Malmö Redhawks
11	D	Klara Holm	1.73 m (5 ft 8 in)	69 kg (152 lb)	29 July 2007 (age 19)	(Denmark) Hvidovre IF
12	F	Mille Sørensen – A	1.56 m (5 ft 1 in)	62 kg (137 lb)	17 December 2001 (age 24)	(Sweden) Leksands IF
13	F	Frida Kielstrup	1.55 m (5 ft 1 in)	63 kg (139 lb)	21 March 2005 (age 21)	(Denmark) Hvidovre IF
14	F	Nicoline Jensen – C	1.65 m (5 ft 5 in)	65 kg (143 lb)	8 November 1992 (age 34)	(Sweden) Malmö Redhawks
17	F	Frederikke Foss	1.72 m (5 ft 8 in)	72 kg (159 lb)	12 February 2005 (age 21)	(Canada) UNB Reds
18	F	Maria Peters	1.68 m (5 ft 6 in)	60 kg (130 lb)	16 August 1999 (age 27)	(Denmark) Odense IK
19	D	Josephine Asperup – A	1.63 m (5 ft 4 in)	65 kg (143 lb)	21 July 1992 (age 34)	(Sweden) Malmö Redhawks
20	F	Teresa Christensen	1.65 m (5 ft 5 in)	54 kg (119 lb)	17 April 2009 (age 17)	(Canada) OHA Mavericks
21	D	Olivia Ranum	1.69 m (5 ft 7 in)	60 kg (130 lb)	18 May 2008 (age 18)	(Sweden) Rögle BK
22	D	Sofie Skott	1.72 m (5 ft 8 in)	62 kg (137 lb)	14 June 2002 (age 24)	(Germany) Mad Dogs Mannheim
23	F	Julie Oksbjerg	1.78 m (5 ft 10 in)	68 kg (150 lb)	2 December 2000 (age 25)	(Denmark) Odense IK
24	F	Julie Henriksen	1.57 m (5 ft 2 in)	68 kg (150 lb)	30 September 2001 (age 25)	(Denmark) Hvidovre IF
26	F	Nikita Bergmann	1.80 m (5 ft 11 in)	63 kg (139 lb)	25 August 2008 (age 18)	(Sweden) Skellefteå AIK
29	F	Sarah Stauning	1.72 m (5 ft 8 in)	70 kg (150 lb)	2 August 2004 (age 22)	(Sweden) Malmö Redhawks
30	G	Caroline Bjergstad	1.65 m (5 ft 5 in)	60 kg (130 lb)	9 March 2005 (age 21)	(United States) RPI Engineers
33	G	Emma-Sofie Nordstrøm	1.77 m (5 ft 10 in)	71 kg (157 lb)	5 November 2002 (age 24)	(Canada) Hamilton Havoc
61	F	Michele Brix Nielsen	1.69 m (5 ft 7 in)	75 kg (165 lb)	10 July 1996 (age 30)	(Denmark) Odense IK
