= 2025 Deutschland Cup =

Tournament details
- Host country: Germany
- Venue: 1 (in 1 host city)
- Dates: 5–9 November
- Teams: 8

The 2025 Deutschland Cup was 36th edition of the tournament, held between 5 and 9 November 2025.

== Men's tournament ==
2025 Deutschland Cup
Tournament details
- Venue: 1 (in 1 host city)
- Dates: 6–9 November
- Teams: 4

Tournament statistics
- Games played: 6
- Goals scored: 34 (5.67 per game)
- Attendance: 13,062 (2,177 per game)
- Scoring leader: (Slovakia) Matúš Sukeľ (5 points)

=== Standings ===
Pos	Team	Pld	W	OTW	OTL	L	GF	GA	GD	Pts
1	Germany (H)	3	2	0	0	1	9	6	+3	6 (Note: Germany 3–0 Slovakia)
2	Slovakia	3	2	0	0	1	10	6	+4	6
3	Latvia	3	1	0	0	2	6	10	−4	3 (Note: Latvia 4–2 Austria)
4	Austria	3	1	0	0	2	9	12	−3	3

Source: IIHF
Rules for classification: 1) points; 2) head-to-head points; 3) head-to-head goal difference; 4) head-to-head number of goals scored.
(H) Host

=== Results ===
All times are local (UTC+1).

6 November 2025; 12:15	Austria	2–6 (0–5, 1–0, 1–1)	Slovakia	Fanatec Arena, Landshut; Attendance: 508

Game reference

David Kickert
Goalies
Stanislav Škorvánek
Referees:
(Hungary) Gergely Gebei
(Germany) Sirko Hunnius
Linesmen:
(Germany) Maksim Cepik
(Germany) Jonas Reinold

	0–1	01:50 – Čajkovič (Čederle, Rosandić)
	0–2	04:10 – Cehlárik (Kňažko, Lantoši) (PP)
	0–3	06:40 – Sukeľ (Okuliar, Takáč)
	0–4	10:29 – Čacho (Čiernik, Ivan)
	0–5	18:20 – Sukeľ (Čederle, Takáč) (PP)
Schneider (Zwerger, Schnetzer) – 35:01	1–5
Thaler (Zündel, Schneider) – 48:25	2–5
	2–6	58:17 – Sukeľ (Takáč, Rosandić) (SH)

8 min
Penalties
10 min
29
Shots
22

6 November 2025; 19:45	Germany	4–1 (2–1, 0–0, 2–0)	Latvia	Fanatec Arena, Landshut; Attendance: 2,107

Game reference

Mathias Niederberger
Goalies
Ivars Punnenovs
Referees:
(Norway) Oskar Ovstedal
(Germany) Marian Rohatsch
Linesmen:
(Germany) Vincent Brüggemann
(Germany) Patrick Laguzov

	0–1	05:40 – Smirnovs (Daugaviņš)
Kahun (Fischbuch, Kälble) – 06:16	1–1
Ehliz (Sinn, Müller) – 11:28	2–1
Sinn (Ehliz, Fischbuch) (PP) – 43:55	3–1
Michaelis (Wagner) (EN) – 57:16	4–1

8 min
Penalties
4 min
33
Shots
20

8 November 2025; 11:00	Slovakia	4–1 (2–0, 1–0, 1–1)	Latvia	Fanatec Arena, Landshut; Attendance: 1,514

Game reference

Eugen Rabčan
Goalies
Gustavs Grigals
Referees:
(Norway) Oskar Ovstedal
(Germany) Marian Rohatsch
Linesmen:
(Germany) Maksim Cepik
(Germany) Joshua Römer

Cehlárik (Lantoši, Hrivík) – 02:50	1–0
Ivan (Okuliar, Čacho) – 10:50	2–0
Sukeľ (Takáč, Hrivík) – 34:27	3–0
Sukeľ (Takáč, Okuliar) – 41:22	4–0
	4–1	43:51 – Smirnovs (Krastenbergs, Daugaviņš)

6 min
Penalties
6 min
32
Shots
23

8 November 2025; 18:45	Germany	2–5 (0–1, 1–1, 0–3)	Austria	Fanatec Arena, Landshut; Attendance: 4,200

Game reference

Dustin Strahlmeier
Goalies
Atte Tolvanen
Referees:
(Hungary) Gergely Gebei
(Germany) Christopher Schadewaldt
Linesmen:
(Germany) Patrick Laguzov
(Germany) Jonas Reinold

	0–1	14:25 – Rohrer (Huber) (SH)
Müller (Brunnhuber, Fleischer) – 29:32	1–1
	1–2	31:52 – Huber (Zündel, Wallner)
	1–3	40:49 – Wallner (Rohrer)
	1–4	51:31 – Rohrer (Hackl, Wallner)
	1–5	54:50 – Zwerger (Haudum, Schneider)
Preto (Fleischer, Brunnhuber) – 58:03	2–5

6 min
Penalties
6 min
24
Shots
26

9 November 2025; 11:00	Latvia	4–2 (0–0, 1–0, 3–2)	Austria	Fanatec Arena, Landshut; Attendance: 1,400

Game reference

Ivars Punnenovs
Goalies
Florian Vorauer
Referees:
(Hungary) Gergely Gebei
(Norway) Oskar Ovstedal
Linesmen:
(Germany) Vincent Brüggemann
(Germany) Patrick Laguzov

Smirnovs (Sējējs, Daugaviņš) – 31:05	1–0
Krastenbergs (Šmits, Smirnovs) (PP) – 42:09	2–0
Indrašis (Brunnhuber, Bukarts) – 49:02	3–0
	3–1	51:58 – Söllinger (Kainz)
	3–2	52:41 – Schneider (Wolf, Nickl)
Krastenbergs (Daugaviņš, Smirnovs) (EN) – 59:16	4–2

4 min
Penalties
8 min
35
Shots
21

9 November 2025; 14:45	Germany	3–0 (2–0, 1–0, 0–0)	Slovakia	Fanatec Arena, Landshut; Attendance: 3,333

Game reference

Maximilian Franzreb
Goalies
Stanislav Škorvánek
Referees:
(Germany) Sirko Hunnius
(Germany) Christopher Schadewaldt
Linesmen:
(Germany) Maksim Cepik
(Germany) Joshua Römer

Tuomie – 10:02	1–0
Rossmy (Kastner, Wagner) – 11:10	2–0
Wagner (Hüttl, Fleischer) – 22:59	3–0

10 min
Penalties
14 min
27
Shots
28

== Women's tournament ==
2025 Deutschland Cup
Tournament details
- Venue: 1 (in 1 host city)
- Dates: 5–8 November
- Teams: 4

Tournament statistics
- Games played: 6
- Goals scored: 33 (5.5 per game)
- Attendance: 8,014 (1,336 per game)
- Scoring leader: (Germany) Emily Nix (5 points)

=== Standings ===
Pos	Team	Pld	W	OTW	OTL	L	GF	GA	GD	Pts
1	Germany (H)	3	1	2	0	0	15	5	+10	7
2	Slovakia	3	2	0	1	0	7	6	+1	7
3	Hungary	3	1	0	0	2	7	13	−6	3
4	France	3	0	0	1	2	4	9	−5	1

Source: IIHF
Rules for classification: 1) points; 2) head-to-head points; 3) head-to-head goal difference; 4) head-to-head number of goals scored.
(H) Host

=== Results ===
5 November 2025; 16:00	Slovakia	3–2 (0–2, 2–0, 1–0)	Hungary	Fanatec Arena, Landshut; Attendance: 340

Game reference

Zuzana Tomečková
Goalies
Anikó Németh
Referees:
(Sweden) Ida Henriksson
(Switzerland) Raica Staiger
Linesmen:
(Germany) Lara Fischer
(Czech Republic) Kristýna Hájková

	0–1	06:58 – Lippai (Seregély, Odnoga)
	0–2	10:46 – Fehér (Lippai, Odnoga)
Kapičáková (Fančovičová, Košecká) (PP) – 26:27	1–2
Nemčeková (Halušková, Tóthová) – 33:12	2–2
Tóthová (Košecká, Kapičáková) (PP) – 40:38	3–2

8 min
Penalties
8 min
18
Shots
33

5 November 2025; 19:30	Germany	3–2 GWS (0–1, 1–1, 1–0) (OT: 0–0) (SO: 1–0)	France	Fanatec Arena, Landshut; Attendance: 1,320

Game reference

Sandra Abstreiter
Goalies
Alice Philbert
Referees:
(Germany) Vanessa Anselm
(Germany) Tijana Haack
Linesmen:
(Germany) Leonie Ernst
(Finland) Tiina Saarimäki

Nix (Weichenhain, Strobel) – 19:49	1–0
	1–1	42:12 – Nonnenmacher (Galbrun) (PP)
	1–2	47:40 – Rozier (Boudin, Duvin)
Kluge (Feldmeier, Gleißner) (EA) – 58:55	2–2

Feldmeier
Hadraschek-Eisenschmid (miss)
Kluge
Haider
Shootout
(miss) Duvin
Rozier
(miss) Mesplède
(miss) Baudrit
6 min
Penalties
10 min
33
Shots
14

6 November 2025; 16:15	France	1–2 (0–0, 1–1, 0–1)	Slovakia	Fanatec Arena, Landshut; Attendance: 757

Game reference

Alice Philbert
Goalies
Lívia Debnárová
Referees:
(Germany) Tijana Haack
(Switzerland) Raica Staiger
Linesmen:
(Germany) Leonie Ernst
(Czech Republic) Kristýna Hájková

	0–1	23:07 – Jancsóová (Rumanová, Fančovičová)
Boudin (Peyne, Baudrit) – 37:23	1–1
	1–2	50:55 – Bednárik (Šuliková, Matejková)

4 min
Penalties
10 min
30
Shots
22

7 November 2025; 15:00	Hungary	4–1 (0–1, 2–0, 2–0)	France	Fanatec Arena, Landshut; Attendance: 526

Game reference

Noémi Takács
Goalies
Margaux Mameri
Violette Pianel
Referees:
(Germany) Tijana Haack
(Sweden) Ida Henriksson
Linesmen:
(Germany) Lara Fischer
(Czech Republic) Kristýna Hájková

	0–1	17:52 – Galbrun (Duvin, Rozier)
Seregély (Szilágyi, Báhiczki-Tóth) – 22:45	1–1
Leidt (Dabasi) – 38:33	2–1
Odnoga (EN) – 57:38	3–1
Báhiczki-Tóth (Weiler) (EN) – 59:23	4–1

2 min
Penalties
10 min
19
Shots
20

7 November 2025; 19:00	Germany	3–2 OT (1–2, 1–0, 0–0) (OT: 1–0)	Slovakia	Fanatec Arena, Landshut; Attendance: 1,825

Game reference

Lisa Hemmerle
Goalies
Lívia Debnárová
Referees:
(Germany) Vanessa Anselm
(Switzerland) Raica Staiger
Linesmen:
(Germany) Leonie Ernst
(Finland) Tiina Saarimäki

Nix (Hadraschek-Eisenschmid, Kluge) (PP) – 05:44	1–0
	1–1	06:01 – Rumanová (Kostková, Matejková)
Botthof (Dopheide, Bartsch) – 32:33	2–1
	2–2	19:35 – Bednárik (Kapičáková, Hlinka) (PP)
Hadraschek-Eisenschmid (Nix, Strobel) – 61:26	3–2

14 min
Penalties
18 min
28
Shots
22

8 November 2025; 14:45	Germany	9–1 (2–0, 3–0, 4–1)	Hungary	Fanatec Arena, Landshut; Attendance: 3,246

Game reference

Sandra Abstreiter
Goalies
Anikó Németh
Noémi Takács
Referees:
(Germany) Vanessa Anselm
(Sweden) Ida Henriksson
Linesmen:
(Czech Republic) Kristýna Hájková
(Finland) Tiina Saarimäki

Strobel (Weichenhain, Bartsch) – 01:40	1–0
Heine (Feldmeier, Haider) (PP) – 15:45	2–0
Hark (Gleißner, Kluge) (PP) – 25:25	3–0
Gleißner (Hadraschek-Eisenschmid) – 27:14	4–0
Haider (Voigt, Feldmeier) – 36:49	5–0
	5–1	40:35 – Seregély (Szilágyi, Odnoga)
Nix (Gleißner, Hark) – 44:34	6–1
Heine (Bartsch, Voigt) – 47:47	7–1
Häckelsmiller (Hadraschek-Eisenschmid) – 50:21	8–1
Feldmeier (Hadraschek-Eisenschmid, Nix) – 51:27	9–1

6 min
Penalties
6 min
38
Shots
17
