= Ice hockey at the 2022 Winter Olympics – Women's qualification =

Qualification for the women's tournament at the 2022 Winter Olympics was determined by the IIHF World Ranking following the 2020 Women's Ice Hockey World Championships. The host along with the top six teams in the world ranking received automatic berths into the Olympics, while all other teams had an opportunity to qualify for the remaining three spots in the Olympics.

== Qualified teams ==
Event	Date	Location	Vacancies	Qualified
Hosts	17 May 2018	(Denmark) Copenhagen	1	China
2020 IIHF World Ranking	12 December 2016 – 10 April 2020	—N/a	6	United States; Canada; Finland (Russia) ROC; Switzerland; Japan
Final qualification tournament	11–14 November 2021	(Czech Republic) Chomutov	1	Czech Republic
Final qualification tournament	11–14 November 2021	(Germany) Füssen	1	Denmark
Final qualification tournament	11–14 November 2021	(Sweden) Luleå	1	Sweden
Total			10	

Notes

1. ^{a} 2020 IIHF World Ranking and formulated from the following events: 2017 World Championship, 2018 World Championship, 2018 Winter Olympic Games, 2019 World Championship and 2020 World Championship
2. ^{b} Halifax and Truro were the sites for 2020 IIHF World Championship; the conclusion of the tournament the ranking was to be finalized with regards to the direct qualification slots, but several 2020 Women's Ice Hockey World Championships were cancelled due to the COVID-19 pandemic. Seeding for 2020 was used in lieu of placement to determine ranking for unplayed tournaments.

== Qualification seeding ==
To qualify directly, a nation had to be ranked in the top six following the 2020 Women's Ice Hockey World Championships. Using the IIHF World Ranking points system, the current year received full value, and each preceding year was worth 25% less. The following is a ranking based on points that were accumulated toward Olympic qualification.

Note: Several WC 2020 tournaments were cancelled due to the COVID-19 pandemic so points for that year were earned based on overall finish in 2019.

Place	1	2	3	4	5	6	7	8	9	10	11	12	13	14	15	16	17	18	19	20	...
Points	1200	1160	1120	1100	1060	1040	1020	1000	960	940	920	900	880	860	840	820	800	780	760	740	...

Qualified directly to Olympic Tournament
Enter qualifying in the final round
Enter qualifying in the pre-qualification round 2
Enter qualifying in the pre-qualification round 1 (cancelled)

Seeding	Team	WC 2020	WC 2019	WC 2018	OLY 2018	WC 2017	Total
1	United States	1200	900	600	600	300	3600
2	Canada	1160	840	580	580	290	3450
3	Finland	1120	870	560	560	280	3390
4	Russia	1100	825	550	550	265	3290
5	Switzerland	1060	795	530	530	255	3170
6	Japan	1040	750	520	520	240	3070
7	Czech Republic	1020	780	500	480	250	3030
8	Germany	1000	765	490	470	275	3000
9	Sweden	920	720	510	510	260	2920
10	France	900	705	480	460	215	2760
11	Denmark	960	675	450	440	225	2750
12	Hungary	940	690	460	410	220	2720
13	Norway	880	660	440	450	230	2660
14	Austria	860	645	470	430	235	2640
15	Slovakia	840	630	430	400	210	2510
16	South Korea	780	585	410	500	180	2455
17	Italy	800	615	420	420	190	2445
18	Netherlands	820	600	360	360	175	2315
Hosts	China	740	555	380	380	195	2250
19	Poland	760	570	370	350	185	2235
20	Kazakhstan	720	540	390	370	205	2225
	Latvia	680	525	400	390	200	2195
21	Great Britain	660	495	350	330	170	2005
22	Slovenia	700	510	320	310	160	2000
23	Spain	640	480	300	340	145	1905
24	Mexico	620	465	310	320	150	1865
25	Turkey	500	375	260	300	130	1565
	North Korea	600	450	340	0	165	1555
	Australia	560	435	330	0	155	1480
26	Chinese Taipei	580	420	290	0	120	1410
27	Iceland	540	390	280	0	135	1345
	New Zealand	520	405	270	0	140	1335
28	Hong Kong	340	285	210	290	100	1225
	Romania	400	345	250	0	125	1120
	Croatia	480	360	240	0	0	1080
	Belgium	420	315	230	0	115	1080
	South Africa	440	300	220	0	110	1070
29	Bulgaria	380	270	200	0	105	955
	Ukraine	460	330	0	0	0	790
30	Lithuania	360	0	0	0	0	360

- Solid shading indicate the nation is assured of being in that round.
- If a nation does not register for olympic qualification those ranked lower move up.

== Pre-qualification Round 1 ==
Teams ranked 27th and lower would have played off to advance to the next round. The tournament was scheduled to take place from 17 to 19 December 2020, but was postponed due to the COVID-19 pandemic until 26 to 29 August 2021.

The tournament was supposed to be held in Reykjavík, Iceland and feature Iceland, Hong Kong, Bulgaria and Lithuania. However, it was cancelled on 9 August 2021 after Bulgaria withdrew and the other teams raised concerns because of the pandemic. As a result Iceland, the highest seeded team, automatically advanced to the next round.

== Pre-qualification Round 2 ==
Teams ranked 16th to 26th, plus one qualifier from Round 1 played in three tournaments to determine qualifiers for the next round. Each tournament winner was ranked by their qualification seeding and entered the next round as qualifier four, five or six. These tournaments were scheduled to take place from 11 to 14 February 2021, but were postponed to 7 to 10 October 2021.

=== Group F ===
The tournament was scheduled to be held in Gangneung, South Korea. On 3 September 2021, the IIHF announced that it had moved the tournament to Nottingham, Great Britain due to COVID-19 restrictions in South Korea.

Pos	Team	Pld	W	OTW	OTL	L	GF	GA	GD	Pts	Qualification
1	South Korea	3	2	0	0	1	13	1	+12	6 (Note: South Korea 3 Pts, +2 GD; Great Britain 3 Pts, 0 GD; Slovenia 3 Pts, −2 GD)	Final qualification
2	Great Britain (H)	3	2	0	0	1	7	2	+5	6	
3	Slovenia	3	2	0	0	1	8	6	+2	6	
4	Iceland	3	0	0	0	3	2	21	−19	0	

Source: IIHF
Rules for classification: 1) points; 2) head-to-head points; 3) head-to-head goal difference; 4) head-to-head number of goals scored; 5) result against closest best-ranked team outside tied teams; 6) result against second-best ranked team outside tied teams; 7) seeding before tournament.
(H) Host
Notes:

All times are local (UTC+1).

7 October 2021; 14:00	Slovenia	0–3 (0–0, 0–2, 0–1)	South Korea	Motorpoint Arena Nottingham, Nottingham; Attendance: 360

Game reference

Pia Dukarič
Goalies
Jang In-hye
Referee:
(Norway) Elise Harbitz-Rasmussen
Linesmen:
(United Kingdom) Faye Andrews
(Norway) Maren Frohaug

0–1	34:00 – Lee E.
0–2	34:55 – Lee E. (Kang S.)
0–3	58:43 – Kang (Lee E., Park Jo.)

8 min
Penalties
12 min
12
Shots
46

7 October 2021; 19:15	Great Britain	5–0 (2–0, 1–0, 2–0)	Iceland	Motorpoint Arena Nottingham, Nottingham; Attendance: 783

Game reference

Nicole Jackson
Ella Howard
Goalies
Birta Helgudóttir
Referee:
(Latvia) Agnese Kārkliņa
Linesmen:
(Denmark) Loise Larsen
(Sweden) Veronica Lovensnö

Gale (Hutchinson) – 09:39	1–0
Hill (Bloom, Adams) (PP) – 12:52	2–0
Headland (Cartwright, Gale) – 31:47	3–0
Allen (Marsden) (PP) – 44:09	4–0
Traill (Marsden, Allen) (PP) – 56:37	5–0

4 min
Penalties
8 min
38
Shots
11

8 October 2021; 14:00	South Korea	10–0 (3–0, 3–0, 4–0)	Iceland	Motorpoint Arena Nottingham, Nottingham; Attendance: 480

Game reference

Jang In-hye
Lee Ye-jin
Goalies
Andrea Bachmann
Birta Helgudóttir
Referee:
(Finland) Hanna Åberg
Linesmen:
(United Kingdom) Lorna Beresford
(Denmark) Loise Larsen

Song (Choi Y.) – 08:44	1–0
Park Jo. (Lee E.) – 10:37	2–0
Lee E. (Kang N., Kim S.) (PP) – 13:12	3–0
Choi S. (Choi Y., Song) – 21:45	4–0
Park C. (Kim S.) – 23:31	5–0
Park Y. (PP) – 28:31	6–0
Choi J. (Kim H.) (PP) – 46:29	7–0
Kim S. (Kim H.) – 48:11	8–0
Kim H. (SH2) – 54:06	9–0
Choi J. (Kim S.) – 54:56	10–0

6 min
Penalties
12 min
45
Shots
6

8 October 2021; 19:00	Great Britain	1–2 (1–0, 0–2, 0–0)	Slovenia	Motorpoint Arena Nottingham, Nottingham; Attendance: 1,027

Game reference

Nicole Jackson
Goalies
Pia Dukarič
Referee:
(Norway) Elise Harbitz-Rasmussen
Linesmen:
(Norway) Maren Frohaug
(Sweden) Veronica Lovensnö

Beal (PP) – 19:17	1–0
	1–1	29:47 – Pren (Blazinšek, Confidenti)
	1–2	31:39 – Blazinšek

12 min
Penalties
10 min
49
Shots
22

10 October 2021; 13:00	Iceland	2–6 (1–1, 1–2, 0–3)	Slovenia	Motorpoint Arena Nottingham, Nottingham; Attendance: 624

Game reference

Birta Helgudóttir
Goalies
Pia Dukarič
Referee:
(Latvia) Agnese Kārkliņa
Linesmen:
(United Kingdom) Faye Andrews
(United Kingdom) Lorna Beresford

Garðarsdóttir (Si. Björgvinsdóttir) (PP) – 01:39	1–0
	1–1	04:16 – Blazinšek (Pren)
Garðarsdóttir (SH) – 23:07	2–1
	2–2	36:34 – Confidenti (Pren)
	2–3	39:56 – Pren (Blazinšek)
	2–4	40:29 – Blazinšek (Lončar)
	2–5	57:15 – E. Dukarič (Biščak) (PP)
	2–6	58:53 – Pren (Confidenti) (ENG)

8 min
Penalties
10 min
27
Shots
23

10 October 2021; 17:00	South Korea	0–1 (0–0, 0–1, 0–0)	Great Britain	Motorpoint Arena Nottingham, Nottingham; Attendance: 1,700

Game reference
Jang In-hye	Goalies	Nicole Jackson	Referee: (Finland) Hanna Åberg; Linesmen: (Denmark) Loise Larsen (Sweden) Veronica Lovensnö
0–1 / 39:00 – Adams (Marsden) (PP)			Referee: (Finland) Hanna Åberg; Linesmen: (Denmark) Loise Larsen (Sweden) Veronica Lovensnö
10 min	Penalties	8 min	Referee: (Finland) Hanna Åberg; Linesmen: (Denmark) Loise Larsen (Sweden) Veronica Lovensnö
25	Shots	23	Referee: (Finland) Hanna Åberg; Linesmen: (Denmark) Loise Larsen (Sweden) Veronica Lovensnö

=== Group G ===
The tournament was held in Torre Pellice, Italy.

Pos	Team	Pld	W	OTW	OTL	L	GF	GA	GD	Pts	Qualification
1	Italy (H)	3	3	0	0	0	13	2	+11	9	Final qualification
2	Spain	3	1	1	0	1	8	6	+2	5	
3	Kazakhstan	3	1	0	1	1	10	6	+4	4	
4	Chinese Taipei	3	0	0	0	3	1	18	−17	0	

Source: IIHF
Rules for classification: 1) points; 2) head-to-head points; 3) head-to-head goal difference; 4) head-to-head number of goals scored; 5) result against closest best-ranked team outside tied teams; 6) result against second-best ranked team outside tied teams; 7) seeding before tournament.
(H) Host

All times are local (UTC+2).

7 October 2021; 16:00	Kazakhstan	7–1 (2–0, 4–1, 1–0)	Chinese Taipei	Olympic Ice Palace, Torre Pellice; Attendance: 100

Game reference

Darya Dmitrieva
Goalies
Hsu Tzu-ting
Referee:
(France) Marie Picavet
Linesmen:
(Slovenia) Ines Confidenti
(Italy) Danielle Rostan

Koroleva (Sviridova) – 11:40	1–0
Berndsen – 16:39	2–0
Broad – 21:02	3–0
	3–1	30:40 – Pan (Yeh)
Filimonova (Sviridova, Koroleva) – 33:36	4–1
Broad (Senger) – 38:15	5–1
Berndsen (McLean, Rioux) – 39:27	6–1
Rioux – 47:29	7–1

4 min
Penalties
6 min
59
Shots
16

7 October 2021; 20:15	Spain	1–4 (0–3, 1–0, 0–1)	Italy	Olympic Ice Palace, Torre Pellice; Attendance: 300

Game reference

Alba Gonzalo
Goalies
Elisa Biondi
Referee:
(Austria) Ulrike Winklmayr
Linesmen:
(Switzerland) Jamie Monard
(Slovenia) Katja Mrak

	0–1	01:35 – Caumo (Roccella)
	0–2	10:03 – Abatangelo (Caumo) (PP)
	0–3	17:10 – Furlani (Mattivi) (PP)
Fernández – 21:03	1–3
	1–4	57:01 – Mazzocchi (Abatangelo)

20 min
Penalties
12 min
16
Shots
46

9 October 2021; 16:00	Kazakhstan	2–3 GWS (0–0, 1–2, 1–0) (OT: 0–0) (SO: 0–1)	Spain	Olympic Ice Palace, Torre Pellice; Attendance: 150

Game reference

Arina Shyokolova
Darya Dmitrieva
Goalies
Alba Gonzalo
Referee:
(Austria) Ulrike Winklmayr
Linesmen:
(Switzerland) Jamie Monard
(Italy) Danielle Rostan

Rioux (Konysheva) – 26:35	1–0
	1–1	26:49 – Muñoz (Fernández de Romartagui)
	1–2	37:14 – Álvarez (Muñoz) (PP2)
McLean (Sayakhatkyzy) – 51:27	2–2

Ashimova (miss)
Aldabergenova (miss)
Broad (miss)
Rioux (miss)
McLean (miss)
Shootout
Scilipoti
(miss) Muñoz
(miss) Ramos
(miss) Gil
16 min
Penalties
8 min
38
Shots
14

9 October 2021; 20:15	Italy	7–0 (1–0, 2–0, 4–0)	Chinese Taipei	Olympic Ice Palace, Torre Pellice; Attendance: 200

Game reference

Martina Fedel
Ilaria Girardi
Goalies
Hsu Tzu-ting
Wang Yun-tzu
Referee:
(Switzerland) Melissa Boverio
Linesmen:
(France) Alexia Cheyroux
(Slovenia) Katja Mrak

Caumo (Roccella) – 15:40	1–0
Stocker (Furlani) – 28:32	2–0
Caumo (Lobis) – 31:12	3–0
Furlani (Gius) (PP) – 43:26	4–0
Caumo (Kaneppele) – 48:34	5–0
Mazzocchi (Saletta) – 51:45	6–0
Gius – 55:03	7–0

2 min
Penalties
10 min
48
Shots
6

10 October 2021; 16:00	Chinese Taipei	0–4 (0–0, 0–3, 0–1)	Spain	Olympic Ice Palace, Torre Pellice; Attendance: 100

Game reference

Hsu Tzu-ting
Wang Yun-tzu
Goalies
Carolina Moreno
Referee:
(Switzerland) Melissa Boverio
Linesmen:
(Slovenia) Katja Mrak
(Italy) Danielle Rostan

0–1	33:43 – Aizpurua (SH)
0–2	38:32 – Fernández de Romartagui (Serna)
0–3	39:47 – Scilipoti
0–4	43:39 – Moreno

6 min
Penalties
4 min
16
Shots
44

10 October 2021; 20:15	Italy	2–1 (0–1, 0–0, 2–0)	Kazakhstan	Olympic Ice Palace, Torre Pellice; Attendance: 300

Game reference

Martina Fedel
Goalies
Darya Dmitrieva
Referee:
(France) Marie Picavet
Linesmen:
(France) Alexia Cheyroux
(Slovenia) Ines Confidenti

	0–1	03:45 – Sviridova (Broad)
Stocker (Mattivi) (PP) – 42:27	1–1
Caumo (Campo) – 50:00	2–1

10 min
Penalties
12 min
31
Shots
15

=== Group H ===
The tournament was held in Bytom, Poland.

Pos	Team	Pld	W	OTW	OTL	L	GF	GA	GD	Pts	Qualification
1	Poland (H)	3	3	0	0	0	23	3	+20	9	Final qualification
2	Netherlands	3	2	0	0	1	32	4	+28	6	
3	Mexico	3	1	0	0	2	8	16	−8	3	
4	Turkey	3	0	0	0	3	1	41	−40	0	

Source: IIHF
Rules for classification: 1) points; 2) head-to-head points; 3) head-to-head goal difference; 4) head-to-head number of goals scored; 5) result against closest best-ranked team outside tied teams; 6) result against second-best ranked team outside tied teams; 7) seeding before tournament.
(H) Host

All times are local (UTC+2).

7 October 2021; 15:30	Poland	12–0 (5–0, 5–0, 2–0)	Turkey	Arena Pulaskiego, Bytom; Attendance: 250

Game reference

Agata Kosińska
Goalies
Merve Karataş
Referee:
(Slovakia) Nikoleta Celárová
Linesmen:
(Spain) Claudia de la Pompa
(Russia) Viktoria Kozhevnikova

Zielińska (Sikorska) – 01:04	1–0
Talanda (Orawska) – 04:23	2–0
Sikorska (Wieczorek, Tomczok) – 09:33	3–0
Czarnecka (Łąpieś) (PP) – 11:45	4–0
Wieczorek (Sikorska) – 11:59	5–0
Późniewska (Łaskawska) – 24:56	6–0
Sikorska (Zielińska) (PP) – 30:34	7–0
Późniewska (Czarnecka) – 33:00	8–0
Późniewska (SH) – 35:32	9–0
Dziwok (Wcisło, Łapińska) – 37:28	10–0
Sikorska (Wieczorek) – 54:30	11–0
Tomczok (Sikorska) – 58:17	12–0

2 min
Penalties
6 min
57
Shots
1

7 October 2021; 19:30	Netherlands	7–1 (1–0, 2–1, 4–0)	Mexico	Arena Pulaskiego, Bytom; Attendance: 50

Game reference

Nadia Zijlstra
Goalies
Mónica Renteria
Referee:
(Czech Republic) Radka Růžičková
Linesmen:
(Poland) Natalia Suchanek
(Poland) Monika Szpyt

Hamers (Schollaardt) – 12:30	1–0
Zwarthoed (Hamers) – 22:56	2–0
Even (Zwarthoed, Hamers) (PP) – 29:56	3–0
	3–1	39:59 – J. Rojas (González)
Collard (Even) – 44:22	4–1
Van Nes (Dijkema) (PP) – 47:55	5–1
Noe (Dijkema, De Jong) – 56:48	6–1
Zwarthoed (SH) – 57:33	7–1

6 min
Penalties
14 min
47
Shots
6

8 October 2021; 16:00	Turkey	0–23 (0–8, 0–6, 0–9)	Netherlands	Arena Pulaskiego, Bytom; Attendance: 50

Game reference

Azra Sert
Goalies
Eline Gabriele
Referee:
(Germany) Svenja Strohmenger
Linesmen:
(Spain) Claudia de la Pompa
(Poland) Monika Szpyt

0–1	01:15 – Barbier (Zwarthoed)
0–2	05:14 – Van Nes (Schollaardt, Tjin-A-Ton)
0–3	06:28 – Dijkema (De Jong)
0–4	10:03 – Van Nes
0–5	10:29 – Barbier
0–6	13:32 – Zwarthoed (Karst, Barbier)
0–7	16:55 – Even (Hamers, Zwarthoed)
0–8	17:57 – Van Nes (Huisman) (PP)
0–9	20:33 – Huisman (Tjin-A-Ton, Van Nes)
0–10	21:24 – Zwarthoed (Collard, Barbier) (PP)
0–11	26:48 – Schollaardt (Van Nes, Tjin-A-Ton)
0–12	27:17 – Barbier (Even, Collard)
0–13	29:58 – Van Nes (Schollaardt, Huisman)
0–14	37:24 – Zwarthoed (Hamers, Barbier)
0–15	41:12 – Van Nes (Tjin-A-Ton)
0–16	44:35 – Tjin-A-Ton (Van Houten)
0–17	45:01 – Hamers (Zwarthoed, Collard)
0–18	47:51 – Zwarthoed (Hamers, Barbier) (PP)
0–19	52:58 – Van Nes (Huisman)
0–20	53:53 – Dijkema (De Jong)
0–21	54:42 – Haverkorn (Van Ooijen)
0–22	58:04 – Van Nes (EA)
0–23	58:58 – Schollaardt (Zwarthoed, Barbier)

6 min
Penalties
4 min
2
Shots
78

8 October 2021; 20:00	Poland	8–1 (5–0, 1–1, 2–0)	Mexico	Arena Pulaskiego, Bytom; Attendance: 250

Game reference

Martyna Sass
Goalies
Mónica Renteria
Referee:
(Czech Republic) Radka Růžičková
Linesmen:
(Austria) Anja Klemm
(Russia) Viktoria Kozhevnikova

Strzelecka (Talanda) – 03:51	1–0
Sikorska (Wieczorek, Tomczok) – 05:51	2–0
Wieczorek (Zielińska, Gogoc) (PP) – 07:18	3–0
Czarnecka (Sfora, Strzelecka) (PP) – 08:21	4–0
Chrapek (Strzelecka, Czarnecka) (PP) – 15:56	5–0
Łąpieś (Talanda) – 37:48	6–0
	6–1	39:26 – Téllez (G. Rojas)
Wieczorek (Tomczok) – 44:58	7–1
Chrapek (Łaskawska, Sfora) (PP) – 51:22	8–1

6 min
Penalties
12 min
64
Shots
3

10 October 2021; 12:15	Netherlands	2–3 (0–0, 1–0, 1–3)	Poland	Arena Pulaskiego, Bytom; Attendance: 300

Game reference

Eline Gabriele
Goalies
Martyna Sass
Referee:
(Slovakia) Nikoleta Celárová
Linesmen:
(Spain) Claudia de la Pompa
(Austria) Anja Klemm

Schollaardt (Barbier) (PP) – 24:21	1–0
Noe (De Jong) – 50:02	2–0
	2–1	52:47 – Późniewska (Wieczorek, Sikorska)
	2–2	54:14 – Sikorska (Późniewska)
	2–3	54:32 – Chrapek (Czarnecka)

18 min
Penalties
12 min
22
Shots
25

10 October 2021; 16:15	Mexico	6–1 (1–0, 0–1, 5–0)	Turkey	Arena Pulaskiego, Bytom; Attendance: 50

Game reference

Mónica Renteria
Daniela Castro
Goalies
Azra Sert
Merve Karatas
Referee:
(Germany) Svenja Strohmenger
Linesmen:
(Poland) Natalia Suchanek
(Poland) Monika Szpyt

Chávez (Amaya) – 1:17	1–0
	1–1	33:26 – Koçak (Tüzgen Dağlı)
Chávez – 41:39	2–1
Chávez (Escobedo) – 45:25	3–1
Téllez (J. Rojas) – 46:24	4–1
Téllez (Chávez) – 51:14	5–1
J. Rojas (G. Rojas, Ayala) – 59:19	6–1

4 min
Penalties
2 min
49
Shots
5

== Final qualification ==
Teams ranked 7th to 15th, plus three qualifiers played in three tournaments to determine qualifiers for the Olympic tournament. Each tournament winner was ranked by their qualification seeding and played in Group B as qualifier one, two, or three. These tournaments were scheduled to take place from 26 to 29 August 2021, but were postponed until 11 to 14 November 2021.

=== Group C ===
The tournament was held in Chomutov, Czech Republic.

Pos	Team	Pld	W	OTW	OTL	L	GF	GA	GD	Pts	Qualification
1	Czech Republic (H)	3	3	0	0	0	24	2	+22	9	2022 Winter Olympics
2	Hungary	3	2	0	0	1	17	9	+8	6	
3	Norway	3	1	0	0	2	11	9	+2	3	
4	Poland	3	0	0	0	3	2	34	−32	0	

Source: IIHF
Rules for classification: 1) points; 2) head-to-head points; 3) head-to-head goal difference; 4) head-to-head number of goals scored; 5) result against closest best-ranked team outside tied teams; 6) result against second-best ranked team outside tied teams; 7) seeding before tournament.
(H) Host

All times are local (UTC+1).

11 November 2021; 12:00	Hungary	11–1 (3–1, 4–0, 4–0)	Poland	Rocknet aréna, Chomutov; Attendance: 110

Game reference

Anikó Németh
Goalies
Martyna Sass
Referees:
(Russia) Daria Ermak
(Finland) Kaisa Ketonen
Linesmen:
(Russia) Polina Danilova
(Finland) Linnea Sainio

	0–1	10:17 – W. Sikorska
Huszák (Dabasi) (PP) – 12:39	1–1
Kreisz – 16:48	2–1
Jókai Szilágyi (Baker) – 19:04	3–1
Kreisz (Huszák, Baker) (PP) – 20:25	4–1
Seregély – 22:37	5–1
Baker (Huszák, Kreisz) (PP) – 24:37	6–1
Szamosfalvi (Strobl) – 37:25	7–1
Seregély – 53:59	8–1
Baker – 55:22	9–1
Horváth (Williams) – 56:00	10–1
Seregély – 57:40	11–1

14 min
Penalties
16 min
53
Shots
21

11 November 2021; 16:00	Czech Republic	3–1 (2–1, 0–0, 1–0)	Norway	Rocknet aréna, Chomutov; Attendance: 753

Game reference

Klára Peslarová
Goalies
Ena Nystrøm
Referees:
(Russia) Elena Ivanova
(United States) Chelsea Rapin
Linesmen:
(Canada) Alex Blair
(Russia) Diana Mokhova

Mills (Horálková, Křížová) (EA) – 10:59	1–0
	1–1	16:16 – Morset (Haug Hansen, Bialik)
Pejšová (Neubauerová) – 16:35	2–1
Lédlová (Pejšová) (EA) – 42:21	3–1

4 min
Penalties
6 min
43
Shots
7

13 November 2021; 16:00	Poland	0–16 (0–5, 0–7, 0–4)	Czech Republic	Rocknet aréna, Chomutov; Attendance: 1,139

Game reference

Agata Kosińska
Martyna Sass
Goalies
Viktorie Švejdová
Referees:
(Russia) Daria Ermak
(Russia) Elena Ivanova
Linesmen:
(Russia) Diana Mokhova
(Finland) Linnea Sainio

0–1	00:52 – Mills (Tejralová, Hymlárová)
0–2	01:58 – Lásková (Serdar)
0–3	06:02 – Neubauerová (Horálková, Mrázová) (EA)
0–4	15:27 – Mills (Tejralová, Hymlárová)
0–5	17:33 – Neubauerová (Mrázová, Tejralová)
0–6	23:03 – Mrázová (Mlýnková)
0–7	26:38 – Mlýnková (Mrázová, Čajanová)
0–8	28:07 – Kolowratová (Přibylová, Lédlová)
0–9	32:07 – Erbanová (Horálková, Tejralová) (PP)
0–10	32:52 – Hymlárová (Křížová)
0–11	38:51 – Serdar (Bukolská) (PP2)
0–12	39:34 – Mrázová (Mlýnková, Tejralová) (PP2)
0–13	40:57 – Čajanová (Serdar)
0–14	48:41 – Hymlárová (Mills)
0–15	54:39 – Lédlová (Erbanová, Pátková) (PP)
0–16	58:24 – Neubauerová (Mrázová)

14 min
Penalties
4 min
3
Shots
57

13 November 2021; 20:00	Hungary	5–3 (0–0, 2–3, 3–0)	Norway	Rocknet aréna, Chomutov; Attendance: 250

Game reference

Anikó Németh
Goalies
Ena Nystrøm
Referees:
(Finland) Kaisa Ketonen
(Canada) Lacey Senuk
Linesmen:
(Russia) Polina Danilova
(United States) Jacqueline Spresser

Metzler (Horváth) – 22:05	1–0
	1–1	26:03 – Haug Hansen (Morset, Kruse) (PP2)
	1–2	26:31 –Fischer (Morset, Berge) (PP)
	1–3	28:06 – Fischer (Haug Hansen, Morset)
Gasparics (Jókai Szilágyi, Williams) – 35:17	2–3
Jókai Szilágyi (Williams) (PP) – 49:43	3–3
Kreisz (Huszák) (PP) – 55:14	4–3
Seregély (Kiss-Simon) (ENG) – 58:27	5–3

10 min
Penalties
10 min
38
Shots
21

14 November 2021; 16:00	Czech Republic	5–1 (3–0, 1–0, 1–1)	Hungary	Rocknet aréna, Chomutov; Attendance: 1,853

Game reference

Klára Peslarová
Goalies
Anikó Németh
Referees:
(United States) Chelsea Rapin
(Canada) Lacey Senuk
Linesmen:
(Canada) Alex Blair
(United States) Jacqueline Spresser

Hymlárová (Tejralová) – 01:24	1–0
Serdar (Čajanová, Lásková) – 12:15	2–0
Přibylová (SH) – 13:55	3–0
Kolowratová (Neubauerová, Mlýnková) – 27:30	4–0
Křížová (Hymlárová, Tejralová) (PP) – 55:30	5–0
	5–1	57:59 – Huszák (Gasparics, Szilágyi)

8 min
Penalties
14 min
32
Shots
15

14 November 2021; 20:00	Norway	7–1 (2–0, 2–1, 3–0)	Poland	Rocknet aréna, Chomutov; Attendance: 110

Game reference
Linnea Holterud Olsson	Goalies	Martyna Sass	Referees: (Russia) Daria Ermak (Finland) Kaisa Ketonen; Linesmen: (Russia) Polina Danilova (Finland) Linnea Sainio
Jørgensen (Nyberg) – 05:42 / 1–0; Fischer (Dalen, Bialik) – 06:35 / 2–0			Referees: (Russia) Daria Ermak (Finland) Kaisa Ketonen; Linesmen: (Russia) Polina Danilova (Finland) Linnea Sainio
17 min	Penalties	2 min	Referees: (Russia) Daria Ermak (Finland) Kaisa Ketonen; Linesmen: (Russia) Polina Danilova (Finland) Linnea Sainio
40	Shots	16	Referees: (Russia) Daria Ermak (Finland) Kaisa Ketonen; Linesmen: (Russia) Polina Danilova (Finland) Linnea Sainio

=== Group D ===
The tournament was held in Füssen, Germany.

Pos	Team	Pld	W	OTW	OTL	L	GF	GA	GD	Pts	Qualification
1	Denmark	3	2	0	1	0	7	3	+4	7	2022 Winter Olympics
2	Austria	3	2	0	0	1	9	2	+7	6	
3	Germany (H)	3	1	1	0	1	7	6	+1	5	
4	Italy	3	0	0	0	3	2	14	−12	0	

Source: IIHF
Rules for classification: 1) points; 2) head-to-head points; 3) head-to-head goal difference; 4) head-to-head number of goals scored; 5) result against closest best-ranked team outside tied teams; 6) result against second-best ranked team outside tied teams; 7) seeding before tournament.
(H) Host

All times are local (UTC+1).

11 November 2021; 17:15	Germany	0–3 (0–1, 0–1, 0–1)	Austria	Arena Füssen, Füssen; Attendance: 386

Game reference

Sandra Abstreiter
Goalies
Selma Luggin
Referees:
(Slovakia) Nikoleta Celárová
(Switzerland) Anna Wiegand
Linesmen:
(United States) Kristin Moore
(United States) Sara Strong

0–1	18:35 – Schafzahl (Meixner)
0–2	34:38 – Weber (Trummer) (PP)
0–3	54:55 – Weber (Trummer)

4 min
Penalties
16 min
20
Shots
23

11 November 2021; 20:45	Denmark	4–0 (1–0, 2–0, 1–0)	Italy	Arena Füssen, Füssen; Attendance: 78

Game reference

Cassandra Repstock-Romme
Goalies
Martina Fedel
Referees:
(Germany) Tijana Haack
(Canada) Elizabeth Mantha
Linesmen:
(Germany) Lisa Linnek
(Canada) Justine Todd

Jakobsen (Brix, Weis) (PP) – 17:43	1–0
Jakobsen (Persson, Weis) – 36:19	2–0
Persson (Jensen, Brix) (PP) – 39:02	3–0
Weis (Persson, Jakobsen) – 46:47	4–0

6 min
Penalties
10 min
36
Shots
19

13 November 2021; 12:00	Italy	1–4 (0–1, 1–1, 0–2)	Germany	Arena Füssen, Füssen; Attendance: 452

Game reference

Elisa Biondi
Goalies
Franziska Albl
Referees:
(Slovakia) Nikoleta Celárová
(Canada) Elizabeth Mantha
Linesmen:
(Austria) Julia Kainberger
(United States) Sara Strong

	0–1	03:05 – N. Eisenschmid (Delarbre, Welcke)
Furlani (Mattivi) (PP) – 24:04	1–1
	1–2	29:30 – Welcke (Zorn)
	1–3	47:16 – Delarbre (N. Eisenschmid, Welcke)
	1–4	51:46 – Jobst-Smith (PP)

16 min
Penalties
12 min
11
Shots
39

13 November 2021; 15:30	Denmark	1–0 (0–0, 1–0, 0–0)	Austria	Arena Füssen, Füssen; Attendance: 207

Game reference
Cassandra Repstock-Romme	Goalies	Selma Luggin	Referees: (Germany) Tijana Haack (Canada) Cianna Lieffers; Linesmen: (Germany) Lisa Linnek (United States) Kristin Moore
Peters (Glud, Asperup) (PP) – 37:37 / 1–0			Referees: (Germany) Tijana Haack (Canada) Cianna Lieffers; Linesmen: (Germany) Lisa Linnek (United States) Kristin Moore
4 min	Penalties	10 min	Referees: (Germany) Tijana Haack (Canada) Cianna Lieffers; Linesmen: (Germany) Lisa Linnek (United States) Kristin Moore
24	Shots	11	Referees: (Germany) Tijana Haack (Canada) Cianna Lieffers; Linesmen: (Germany) Lisa Linnek (United States) Kristin Moore

14 November 2021; 12:00	Germany	3–2 GWS (0–0, 2–1, 0–1) (OT: 0–0) (SO: 1–0)	Denmark	Arena Füssen, Füssen; Attendance: 565

Game reference

Franziska Albl
Goalies
Cassandra Repstock-Romme
Referees:
(Canada) Cianna Lieffers
(Switzerland) Anna Wiegand
Linesmen:
(Austria) Julia Kainberger
(United States) Kristin Moore

T. Eisenschmid (Zorn, Jobst-Smith) – 30:24	1–0
Welcke (Karpf, Weidenfelder) (PP) – 34:15	2–0
	2–1	39:18 – Frandsen (Jakobsen, Weis)
	2–2	47:58 – Glud (Frandsen, Asperup)

N. Eisenschmid (miss)
Zorn
Kluge
Feldmeier (miss)
T. Eisenschmid (miss)
Zorn
Shootout
Jakobsen
(miss) Brix
(miss) Glud
Jensen
(miss) Skriver
(miss) Asperup
4 min
Penalties
10 min
21
Shots
21

14 November 2021; 15:30	Austria	6–1 (2–1, 1–0, 3–0)	Italy	Arena Füssen, Füssen; Attendance: 89

Game reference

Selma Luggin
Goalies
Martina Fedel
Referees:
(Slovakia) Nikoleta Celárová
(Germany) Tijana Haack
Linesmen:
(Germany) Lisa Linnek
(Canada) Justine Todd

	0–1	03:35 – Furlani (Campo Bagatin, Gius)
Meixner (Fazokas) – 12:38	1–1
Weber (Trummer) – 16:28	2–1
Fazokas (Schafzahl, Matzka) – 34:48	3–1
Matzka (Hofbauer) – 51:34 (PP)	4–1
Matzka (Trummer) – 57:07	5–1
Trummer (Weber) (SH) – 59:45	6–1

4 min
Penalties
4 min
26
Shots
27

=== Group E ===
The tournament was held at the Coop Norrbotten Arena in Luleå, Sweden.

Pos	Team	Pld	W	OTW	OTL	L	GF	GA	GD	Pts	Qualification
1	Sweden (H)	3	3	0	0	0	21	2	+19	9	2022 Winter Olympics
2	France	3	2	0	0	1	9	4	+5	6	
3	Slovakia	3	1	0	0	2	8	7	+1	3	
4	South Korea	3	0	0	0	3	1	26	−25	0	

Source: IIHF
Rules for classification: 1) points; 2) head-to-head points; 3) head-to-head goal difference; 4) head-to-head number of goals scored; 5) result against closest best-ranked team outside tied teams; 6) result against second-best ranked team outside tied teams; 7) seeding before tournament.
(H) Host

All times are local (UTC+1).

11 November 2021; 15:00	France	4–0 (1–0, 2–0, 1–0)	South Korea	Coop Norrbotten Arena, Luleå; Attendance: 112

Game reference

Caroline Baldin
Goalies
Jang In-hye
Referees:
(Russia) Daria Abrosimova
(Sweden) Maria Furberg
Linesmen:
(Sweden) Anna Hammar
(Sweden) Veronica Lovensnö

Duvin (Rozier, Aurard) – 12:33	1–0
Rozier – 30:17	2–0
Mesplède – 33:37	3–0
Rozier (Escudero) (PP) – 56:58	4–0

10 min
Penalties
8 min
36
Shots
10

11 November 2021; 19:00	Slovakia	0–3 (0–1, 0–0, 0–2)	Sweden	Coop Norrbotten Arena, Luleå; Attendance: 1,011

Game reference

Nikola Zimková
Goalies
Sara Grahn
Referees:
(United States) Kelly Cooke
(Latvia) Agnese Kārkliņa
Linesmen:
(United States) Kendall Hanley
(China) Wang Hui

0–1	19:42 – Nordin (Olsson, Bouveng)
0–2	40:43 – Wikner (Löwenhielm, Persson)
0–3	48:26 – Bouveng (PP)

4 min
Penalties
8 min
15
Shots
29

13 November 2021; 12:00	France	3–1 (1–0, 1–0, 1–1)	Slovakia	Coop Norrbotten Arena, Luleå; Attendance: 157

Game reference

Caroline Baldin
Goalies
Nikola Zimková
Referees:
(Russia) Daria Abrosimova
(Finland) Anniina Nurmi
Linesmen:
(Slovakia) Magdaléna Čerhitová
(Sweden) Anna Hammar

Duvin (Rozier) – 01:22	1–0
Gendarme (Aurard) – 22:03	2–0
Baudrit (SH) – 50:18	3–0
	3–1	54:05 – Čupková (PS)

6 min
Penalties
8 min
23
Shots
28

13 November 2021; 16:00	Sweden	15–0 (7–0, 4–0, 4–0)	South Korea	Coop Norrbotten Arena, Luleå

Game reference

Emma Söderberg
Goalies
Jang In-hye
Yejin Ye-jin
Referees:
(Sweden) Maria Furberg
(Latvia) Agnese Kārkliņa
Linesmen:
(Finland) Jenni Heikkinen
(Sweden) Veronica Lovensnö

Carlsson (Hjalmarsson, Hedin) – 02:16	1–0
Wikner Zienkiewicz (Löwenhielm, Waxin) – 02:45	2–0
Nordin (Bouveng) – 06:45	3–0
Hjalmarsson (Lis. Johansson) – 08:23	4–0
Ljungblom (Adolfsson, Andersson) – 10:50	5–0
Hedin (Lis. Johansson, Hjalmarsson) – 11:28	6–0
Wikner Zienkiewicz (Persson, Waxin) – 18:18	7–0
Nordin (Persson) – 20:16	8–0
Bouveng (Olsson) – 27:10	9–0
Hjalmarsson (Hedin, Fällman) – 36:32	10–0
Wikner Zienkiewicz (Persson, Löwenhielm) – 37:53	11–0
Lundin (Löwenhielm, Bouveng) – 44:36	12–0
Ljungblom (Lin. Johansson, Adolfsson) – 45:52	13–0
Nordin (Olsson, Kjellbin) (PP) – 54:57	14–0
Fällman (Lis. Johansson, Hjalmarsson) – 55:10	15–0

6 min
Penalties
4 min
47
Shots
5

14 November 2021; 12:00	South Korea	1–7 (1–4, 0–2, 0–1)	Slovakia	Coop Norrbotten Arena, Luleå; Attendance: 52

Game reference

Jang In-hye
Goalies
Laura Medviďová
Referees:
(Russia) Daria Abrosimova
(Latvia) Agnese Kārkliņa
Linesmen:
(Slovakia) Magdaléna Čerhitová
(China) Wang Hui

	0–1	03:22 – Korenková
	0–2	05:08 – Čupková (Bednárik, Hlinková)
	0–3	10:55 – Čupková (Šuliková, Kubeková)
	0–4	13:17 – Ištocyová (Šuliková, Korenková) (PP)
Choi J. – 17:19	1–4
	1–5	23:46 – Kúbeková
	1–6	35:53 – Matejková (Košecká, Maskaľová) (PP)
	1–7	53:38 – Ištocyová (Kúbeková)

6 min
Penalties
4 min
12
Shots
36

14 November 2021; 19:00	Sweden	3–2 (1–0, 1–1, 1–1)	France	Coop Norrbotten Arena, Luleå; Attendance: 1,149

Game reference

Sara Grahn
Goalies
Caroline Baldin
Referees:
(United States) Kelly Cooke
(Finland) Anniina Nurmi
Linesmen:
(United States) Kendall Hanley
(Finland) Jenni Heikkinen

Löwenhielm (Wikner Zienkiewicz, Persson) – 12:30	1–0
Hjalmarsson (Carlsson) – 23:28	2–0
	2–1	27:17 – Rozier (Parment)
Ljungblom (Adolfsson, Lin. Johansson) – 41:58	3–1
	3–2	55:43 – Villiot (Escudero, Rozier)

2 min
Penalties
13 min
40
Shots
17
