= 2020–21 EWHL season =

17th season of the European Women's Hockey League

- League: European Women's Hockey League
- Sport: Ice hockey
- Duration: 26 September 2020 – 21 February 2021
- Number of games: 16 per team
- Number of teams: 9

Regular Season
- Season champions: KMH Budapest
- Runners-up: ŠKP Bratislava
- Top scorer: Hayley Williams (KMH Budapest)

Playoffs
- Finals champions: KMH Budapest
- Runners-up: EHV Sabres

Seasons
- ← 2019–20 2021–22 →

The 2020–21 EWHL season was the seventeenth season of the European Women's Hockey League (EWHL) since the league's creation in 2004. It was the second season since the league's administrative and organizational duties were transferred to the Hungarian Ice Hockey Federation (HIHF/MJSZ).

KMH Budapest played a perfect season in which they won all sixteen games to claim the regular season title. KMH held steady in the playoffs, shutting out their opponents in both games on the way to winning the team's third consecutive EWHL Championship title.

KMH Budapest players also dominated the league's individual statistics. KMH forward Hayley Williams narrowly beat out teammate Alexandra Huszák as top point scorer in the regular season, with 9 goals and 22 assists for 31 points in fifteen games played. Huszák was the EWHL top goal scorer, netting 18 goals in 13 games played. Eighteen year old Zsófia Tóth topped the goaltender statistics with a stellar .972 save percentage and 0.83 goals against average.

== Teams ==
Team	Location	Home venue	Head coach
Aisulu Almaty	(Kazakhstan) Almaty	none	Alexander Maltsev
DEC Salzburg Eagles	(Austria) Salzburg	Eisarena Salzburg	Johanna Ikonen
EHV Sabres Vienna	(Austria) Vienna	Erste Bank Arena	Risto Kurkinen
EV Bozen Eagles	(Italy) Bolzano	PalaOnda	Stefano Daprà
KMH Budapest	(Hungary) Budapest	Tüskesátor	Mika Väärälä
Lakers Kärnten	(Austria) Villach	Stadthalle Villach	Günther Ropatsch
MAC Budapest	(Hungary) Budapest	Kisstadion	András Kis
Silesian Metropolis Katowice	(Poland) Katowice	Jantor Janów	Tomasz Marznica
ŠKP Bratislava	(Slovakia) Bratislava	none	Tomáš Segíň

== Regular season ==
The regular season began on 26 September 2020 and ended on 21 February 2021. MAC Budapest were the regular season champions after playing a perfect season, in which they won all sixteen games in regulation time.

Pos	Team	Pld	W	OTW	OTL	L	GF	GA	GD	Pts	Final Result
1	KMH Budapest	16	16	0	0	0	81	18	+63	48	Advanced to playoffs
2	ŠKP Bratislava	16	12	0	0	4	63	39	+24	36	Advanced to playoffs
3	EHV Sabres	16	11	1	0	4	57	29	+28	35	Advanced to playoffs
4	MAC Budapest	16	9	1	2	4	62	40	+22	31	Advanced to playoffs
5	Aisulu Almaty	16	7	1	2	6	55	39	+16	25	Did not advance
6	DEC Salzburg	16	6	1	0	9	42	67	−25	20	Did not advance
7	Metropolis Katowice	16	3	1	0	12	35	65	−30	11	Did not advance
8	Lakers Kärnten	16	2	1	0	13	31	83	−52	8	Did not advance
9	EV Bolzano	16	0	0	2	14	13	60	−47	2	Did not advance

Updated to match(es) played on 21 February 2021. Source: European Women's Hockey League

=== Player statistics ===
==== Scoring leaders ====
The following players led the league in points at the conclusion of the regular season on 21 February 2021.

	Player	Team	GP	G	A	Pts
1	Hayley Williams	KMH Budapest	15	9	22	31
2	Alexandra Huszák	KMH Budapest	13	18	12	30
3	Fanni Gasparics	MAC Budapest	16	17	12	29
4	Annika Fazokas	DEC Salzburg	16	17	10	27
5	Danielle Hartje	ŠKP Bratislava	16	11	14	25
6	Karolina Późniewska	Katowice	16	8	15	23
7	Emilie Brigham	DEC Salzburg	16	12	9	21
8	Roxanne Rioux	Aisulu Almaty	16	9	9	18
9	Kinga Jókai Szilágyi	EHV Sabres	16	8	10	18
10	Kayla Nielsen	EHV Sabres	14	9	8	17
11	Tatiana Ištocyová	ŠKP Bratislava	16	5	12	17

==== Goaltenders ====
The following goaltenders lead the league in save percentage at the conclusion of the season on 21 February 2021, while starting at least one third of matches.

	Player	Team	GP	TOI	W	L	SA	GA	SO	SV%	GAA
1	Zsófia Tóth	KMH Budapest	7	363	6	0	177	5	1	.972	0.83
2	Selma Luggin	EHV Sabres	10	581	8	2	311	11	3	.965	1.14
3	Maude Lévesque-Ryan	KMH Budapest	9	537:37	9	0	195	13	2	.933	1.45
4	Carmen Lasis	DEC Salzburg	16	945:35	7	9	761	59	1	.922	3.74
5	Nikola Zimková	ŠKP Bratislava	6	360:00	5	1	133	11	0	.917	1.84
6	Darya Dmitriyeva	Aisulu Almaty	10	569:13	4	6	257	23	3	.909	2.42
7	Anikó Németh	MAC Budapest	16	930	10	6	394	37	4	.906	2.39
8	Jessica Ekrt	EHV Sabres	7	378:56	4	2	177	17	0	.904	2.69
9	Agata Kosińska	Metropolis Katowice	9	490:22	3	5	329	33	0	.900	4.04
10	Molly Jenkins	Aisulu Almaty	7	399:53	4	2	149	15	1	.899	2.25

== Playoffs ==
Semifinal
1	KMH Budapest	1
4	MAC Budapest	0
2	ŠKP Bratislava	1
3	EHV Sabres	0

Championship final
1	KMH Budapest	1
3	EHV Sabres	0
Bronze medal game
2	ŠKP Bratislava	1
4	MAC Budapest	0

=== Semifinals ===
27 February 2021; 14:00	KMH Budapest (Hungary)	3–2; 1–1 / 1–1 / 0–0 / 0–0	(Hungary) MAC Budapest	Tüskesátor, Budapest

Game reference

Zsófia Tóth
Goalies
Anikó Németh
Referees:
Gergely Korbuly
Márk Kókai
Linesmen:
Adrienn Paulheim
Bence Kövesi

	0–1	2:24 – Gasparics (Odnoga, Gowie)
Escudero (SH) – 10:35	1–1
	1–2	29:15 – Pázmándi (Pártos, Gasparics)
Williams (Huszák, Szamosfalvi) – 29:46	2–2

Alexandra Huszák
6 min
Penalties
6 min
40
Shots
32

February 27, 2021; 17:00	ŠKP Bratislava (Slovenia)	3–4; 2–1 / 1–1 / 0–1 / 0–1	(Austria) EHV Sabres	Tüskesátor, Budapest

Game reference

Nikola Zimková
Goalies
Selma Luggin
Referees:
Barna Kis-Király
Bonifác Máhr-Stumpf
Linesmen:
Zóra Gottlibet
Bernadett Holzer

Hartje (L. Ištocyová) – 1:13	1–0
Hartje (L. Ištocyová, Vysokajová) – 9:13	2–0
	2–1	18:23 – Hofbauer
	2–2	20:27 – Edney (PS)
Vysokajová (T. Ištocyová) – 27:21	3–2
	3–3	59:49 – Trummer (Jókai-Szilágyi, Nielsen) (PP)
	3–4	61:41 – Trummer (PS)

14 min
Penalties
4 min
29
Shots
32

=== Bronze medal game ===
28 February 2021; 10:30	ŠKP Bratislava (Slovenia)	1–0; 0–0 / 1–0 / 0–0	(Hungary) MAC Budapest	Tüskesátor, Budapest

Game reference
Nikola Zimková	Goalies	Anikó Németh	Referees: Bonifác Máhr-Stumpf; Márk Kókai; Linesmen: Bence Kövesi; Zóra Gottlibet
Kapičáková (T. Ištocyová, Korenková) – 38:53 / 1–0			Referees: Bonifác Máhr-Stumpf; Márk Kókai; Linesmen: Bence Kövesi; Zóra Gottlibet
8 min	Penalties	6 min	Referees: Bonifác Máhr-Stumpf; Márk Kókai; Linesmen: Bence Kövesi; Zóra Gottlibet
24	Shots	23	Referees: Bonifác Máhr-Stumpf; Márk Kókai; Linesmen: Bence Kövesi; Zóra Gottlibet

=== Championship final ===
28 February 2021; 13:30	KMH Budapest (Hungary)	3–0; 1–0 / 2–0 / 0–0	(Austria) EHV Sabres	Tüskesátor, Budapest

Game reference

Zsófia Tóth
Goalies
Selma Luggin
Referees:
Barna Kis-Király
Gergely Korbuly
Linesmen:
Bernadett Holzer
Adrienn Paulheim

Somogyi (Ungár, Kiss-Simon) – 9:11	1–0
Tarnowski (Szamosfalvi, Tóth) (PP) – 28:16	2–0
Tarnowski (SH) – 39:44	3–0

16 min
Penalties
24 min
33
Shots
44

=== Player statistics ===
==== Scoring leaders ====
The following players led the league in playoff points.

	Player	Team	GP	G	A	Pts
1	Danielle Hartje	ŠKP Bratislava	2	2	0	2
1	Natasza Tarnowski	KMH Budapest	2	2	0	2
1	Anja Trummer	EHV Sabres	2	2	0	2
4	Fanni Gasparics	MAC Budapest	2	1	1	2
4	Sofia Vysokajová	ŠKP Bratislava	2	1	1	2
6	Lucia Ištocyová	ŠKP Bratislava	2	0	2	2
6	Tatiana Ištocyová	ŠKP Bratislava	2	0	2	2
6	Petra Szamosfalvi	KMH Budapest	2	0	2	2

==== Goaltenders ====
The following goaltenders recorded time in net during the playoffs.

	Player	Team	GP	TOI	W	L	SA	GA	SO	SV%	GAA
1	Zsófia Tóth	KMH Budapest	2	125	2	0	74	2	1	.974	0.96
2	Anikó Németh	MAC Budapest	2	123	0	2	63	3	0	.952	1.47
3	Nikola Zimková	ŠKP Bratislava	2	122	1	1	55	4	1	.927	1.97
4	Selma Luggin	EHV Sabres	2	119	1	1	62	6	0	.903	3.04

== Awards ==
- Best goaltender: Zsófia Tóth, KMH Budapest
- Top goal scorer: Alexandra Huszák, KMH Budapest
- Top point scorer: Hayley Williams, KMH Budapest

=== 2020–21 All-Star Team ===
- Goaltender: Selma Luggin, EHV Sabres
- Defenceman: Franciska Kiss-Simon, KMH Budapest
- Defenceman: Tatiana Ištocyová, ŠKP Bratislava
- Winger: Annika Fazokas, DEC Salzburg
- Center: Alexandra Huszák, KMH Budapest
- Winger: Fanni Gasparics, KMH Budapest
