= Alexandra Gowie =

Canadian-Hungarian ice hockey player

- Born: 2 February 1993 (age 33) Durban, South Africa
- Height: 173 cm (5 ft 8 in)
- Weight: 66 kg (146 lb; 10 st 6 lb)
- Position: Defense
- Shoots: Right
- EWHL team Former teams: KSV Highlanders; Alberta Pandas; EV Bozen Eagles; HK Spišská Nová Ves; KMH Budapest; Calgary Dinos
- National team: Hungary
- Playing career: 2011–present

Alexandra Vena "Alex" Gowie (born 2 February 1993) is a Canadian-Hungarian ice hockey player and member of the Hungarian national ice hockey team, currently playing in the European Women's Hockey League (EWHL) with the women's representative team of MAC Budapest.

She represented Hungary at the 2021 IIHF Women's World Championship.

== Playing career ==
Born in Durban, South Africa, Gowie grew up in Port Coquitlam, British Columbia, Canada. As a teen, she played ice hockey with the Thompson-Okanagan Rockets in the BC Female Midget AAA Hockey League and with the Okanagan Hockey Academy.

Gowie became a member of the Calgary Dinos women's ice hockey program in 2011, joining a roster which included international stars Hayley Wickenheiser and Iya Gavrilova. In her rookie season, she won the Canadian Interuniversity Sport women's ice hockey championship with the Dinos. Uncertain about her major and with the encouragement of Hungarian teammate, Kitti Trencsényi, Gowie opted to leave the team after three seasons and pursue playing opportunities in Europe.

Alongside Trencsényi, she signed with the women's representative team of the Hungarian ice hockey club KMH Budapest for the 2014–15 EWHL season. In her first season, she led the team in scoring and was urged to return for a second season, at the end of which she would be eligible to play for the Hungarian national team. Gowie decided to resign with KMH for the 2015–16 season and led the team in scoring for a second consecutive season.

=== International career ===
Gowie gained Hungarian dual citizenship in 2016 and made her debut with the Hungarian national team in December 2016, during the third preliminary round of qualification for the 2018 Winter Olympics. She joined a number of former KMH teammates on the national team roster, including Réka Dabasi, Jelena Grković, Kinga Jókai Szilágyi, Anikó Németh, Bernadett Németh, Réka Pártos, Hanna Pintér, and Alexandra Rónai.

== Career statistics ==
=== International ===
Year	Team	Event	Result	GP	G	A	Pts	PIM
2016	Hungary	OGQ	DNQ	3	1	1	2	2
2018	Hungary	WW D1A	3rd	5	1	1	2	2
2019	Hungary	WW D1A	1st	5	0	1	1	2
2021	Hungary	WW	9th	4	2	0	2	0
Totals				14	3	2	5	4
