= Taylor Baker (ice hockey) =

Hungarian-Canadian ice hockey player

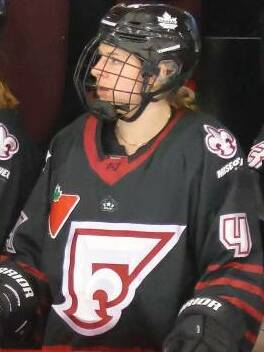
- Baker with the Montreal Force in 2022
- Born: July 30, 1997 (age 29) Toronto, Ontario, Canada
- Height: 5 ft 5 in (165 cm)
- Weight: 143 lb (65 kg; 10 st 3 lb)
- Position: Defence
- Shoots: Right
- SDHL team Former teams: Brynäs IF: New York Sirens; Montreal Force; MAC Budapest
- National team: Hungary
- Playing career: 2016–present

Taylor Samantha Baker (born July 30, 1997) is a Hungarian-Canadian ice hockey player who is a defender and member of the Hungarian national team. She has played in the Swedish Women's Hockey League (SDHL) with Brynäs IF since January 17, 2025.

== Playing career ==
Baker began playing ice hockey early in her childhood, around 3 or 4 years of age, and developed on minor teams in her home city of Toronto. Her junior career was played with the Toronto Jr. Aeros in the Provincial Women's Hockey League (Provincial WHL). She played one regular season game with the Jr. Aeros in the 2012–13 and 2013–14 Provincial WHL seasons before fully joining the team for the 2014–15 season. Across her final two seasons with the team, 2014–15 and 2015–16, she scored 10 goals and 19 assists for 29 points in 72 games and racked up 62 penalty minutes. During Baker's four seasons with the Jr. Aeros, the team's roster featured a number of future Premier Hockey Federation (PHF) and Professional Women's Hockey Players Association (PWHPA) players, including Jessie Eldridge, Loren Gabel, Mikyla Grant-Mentis, Emma Greco, Sarah Knee, Daryl Watts, and Breanne Wilson-Bennett.

=== NCAA ===
Her college ice hockey career was played with the RIT Tigers women's ice hockey program in the College Hockey America (CHA) conference of the NCAA Division I during 2016 to 2020. A traditional stay-at-home defenceman, Baker amassed modest collegiate statistics in offensive categories but was a standout in blocked shots. She led the team in her first season with 60 blocked shots and tallied 49 and 45 blocked shots respectively in the following two seasons.

=== Professional ===
The end of Baker's college career coincided with the onset of the COVID-19 pandemic in North America. Options to play in Canada or the United States were suddenly in short supply, so she pursued opportunities in Europe and opted to sign with the women's ice hockey team of MAC Budapest, which plays in the European Women's Hockey League (EWHL) and the Női OB I bajnokság. She played the 2020–21 season and 2021–22 season with MAC Budapest.

Returning to Canada after six seasons playing abroad, Baker signed with the newest expansion team of the Premier Hockey Federation (PHF), the Montreal Force, one day before the 2022–23 PHF season began. That season, she and Christine Deaudelin tied as the Force's top scoring defencemen, with nine points each.

Following the buyout of the PHF in June 2023, Baker signed in the newly established Professional Women's Hockey League (PWHL) with PWHL New York. She played in 22 of 24 games with New York during the 2024 PWHL season. Ahead of the 2024–25 PWHL season, PWHL New York was renamed the New York Sirens. Baker re-signed with the freshly renamed team but played in only three games before her contract was released on January 4, 2025.

Baker relocated to Sweden soon thereafter to sign with Brynäs IF for the remainder of the 2024–25 SDHL season. She joined former PWHLer Maude Poulin-Labelle and Hunagrian national team captain Fanni Garát-Gasparics, in addition to a number of national team players from other nations, on the Brynäs roster.

== International play ==
Baker was offered Hungarian citizenship and the chance to compete with the Hungarian national team while playing with MAC Budapest. She made her debut with the Hungarian national team in the qualification tournament for the 2022 Winter Olympics, at which Hungary narrowly missed qualifying. Her first IIHF Women's World Championship was the 2022 Top Division tournament in Denmark and she also represented Hungary at the 2023 Top Division tournament.

== Personal life ==
Baker was born on July 30, 1997, in Toronto to Nancy and Peter Baker. One of three siblings, she has two brothers.

She earned a bachelor's degree in biomedical sciences from Rochester Institute of Technology (RIT) and an MBA with a concentration in sports business from Toronto Metropolitan University in 2023.

Baker holds multiple citizenship – Canadian by birth and Hungarian via naturalization. She does not speak Hungarian.

== Career statistics ==
=== Regular season and playoffs ===
| | | | Regular season | | | | | Playoffs |
| Season | Team | League | GP | G | A | Pts | PIM | GP | G | A | Pts | PIM |
|---|---|---|---|---|---|---|---|---|---|---|---|---|
| 2014–15 | Toronto Jr. Aeros | Prov. WHL | 36 | 7 | 9 | 16 | 32 | 14 | 2 | 1 | 3 | 0 |
| 2015–16 | Toronto Jr. Aeros | Prov. WHL | 36 | 3 | 10 | 13 | 30 | 11 | 1 | 1 | 2 | 10 |
| 2016–17 | Rochester Institute of Technology | CHA | 34 | 1 | 2 | 3 | 14 | — | — | — | — | — |
| 2017–18 | Rochester Institute of Technology | CHA | 31 | 0 | 1 | 1 | 26 | — | — | — | — | — |
| 2018–19 | Rochester Institute of Technology | CHA | 19 | 2 | 7 | 9 | 14 | — | — | — | — | — |
| 2019–20 | Rochester Institute of Technology | CHA | 35 | 3 | 11 | 14 | 32 | — | — | — | — | — |
| 2020–21 | MAC Budapest | EWHL | 16 | 5 | 9 | 14 | 6 | 2 | 0 | 0 | 0 | 0 |
| 2021–22 | MAC Budapest | EWHL | 17 | 4 | 14 | 18 | 12 | 4 | 0 | 0 | 0 | 0 |
| 2022–23 | Montreal Force | PHF | 24 | 1 | 8 | 9 | 14 | — | — | — | — | — |
| 2023–24 | New York | PWHL | 22 | 0 | 0 | 0 | 6 | — | — | — | — | – |
| 2024–25 | New York Sirens | PWHL | 3 | 0 | 0 | 0 | 0 | — | — | — | — | — |
| College totals | | | 119 | 6 | 21 | 27 | 86 | — | — | — | — | — |
| PWHL totals | | | 25 | 0 | 0 | 0 | 6 | — | — | — | — | — |

=== International ===
| Year | Team | Event | Result | GP | G | A | Pts | PIM |
|---|---|---|---|---|---|---|---|---|
| 2021 | Hungary | OGQ | DNQ | 3 | 2 | 2 | 4 | 4 |
| 2022 | Hungary | WC | 8th | 6 | 0 | 0 | 0 | 2 |
| 2023 | Hungary | WC | 9th | 4 | 0 | 0 | 0 | 6 |
| 2024 | Hungary | WC D1A | 2nd | 4 | 0 | 1 | 1 | 6 |
| | | | | 14 | 0 | 1 | 1 | 14 |
