= Lotti Odnoga =

Hungarian ice hockey player (born 1999)

- Born: 19 January 1999 (age 27) Győr, Hungary
- Height: 1.75 m (5 ft 9 in)
- Weight: 71 kg (157 lb; 11 st 3 lb)
- Position: Defense
- Shoots: Left
- SDHL team Former teams: Skellefteå AIK: St. Thomas Tommies; Dartmouth Big Green; MAC Budapest; KMH Budapest; SDE
- National team: Hungary
- Playing career: 2013–present

Lotti Odnoga (born 19 January 1999) is a Hungarian ice hockey defenseman and member of the Hungarian national team, currently playing in the Swedish Women's Hockey League (SDHL) with Skellefteå AIK.

== Playing career ==
Odnoga developed in the minor ice hockey department of Győri ETO HC in her home city of Győr in northwestern Hungary. She played on boys' teams with Győri ETO HC throughout her childhood. At age 14, she began to also play with the KMH Budapest senior women's team in the Elite Women's Hockey League (EWHL), making her debut in the 2013–14 season. Odnoga continued to split her time between the Győri ETO HC junior men's teams and KMH Budapest during the 2014–15 season, appearing in fifteen games with KMH and recording 10 points on 4 goals and 6 assists.

The 2015–16 season saw Odnoga relocate to the United States to attend Vermont Academy, a private boarding school in Saxtons River, Vermont. She became interested in attending the school after speaking with the Vermont Academy ice hockey coach at an international ice hockey camp in Lake Placid, New York during the summer of 2015, however, playing ice hockey and studying in the United States had long been a dream of hers. At Vermont Academy, she was a three-sport athlete, participating in association football, ice hockey, and tennis, and a ten-time letter winner. In her senior year, Odnoga served as captain of the tennis team and earned Division II All-NEPSAC First Team ice hockey honours and was named to the NEPSAC Class D Ice Hockey Tournament All-Star Team.

As high school graduation approached, Odnoga received scholarship offers to play NCAA Division I ice hockey at a number of schools, including Rensselaer Polytechnic Institute (RPI), the University of Vermont, and Boston University, among others, but ultimately committed to Dartmouth College due to its small size, Ivy League reputation, and her familiarity with and affinity for the area – Dartmouth campus is less than 50 miles (80 km) from Vermont Academy.

In her rookie season with the Dartmouth Big Green women's ice hockey program, she ranked fourth on the team in points, with 12 points in 29 games, and led the team in assists, with 10. She also led the team in penalty minutes, with 42 PIM – twelve more minutes than her second ranked teammate. Odnoga continued to be a leading defenseman for the Big Green in her sophomore season, again ranking fourth for points, with 11 points in 29 games, and tying with forward Gabby Billing for most assists, with 9. Her performance in the 2019–20 season merited selection to the All-Ivy Honorable Mention team, making Odnoga the only Dartmouth Big Green player to earn All-Ivy lauds that season.

She concluded her collegiate career with the St. Thomas Tommies women's ice hockey program in the Western Collegiate Hockey Association (WCHA) conference during the 2022–23 season.

== Personal life ==
Odnoga's older brother, Mátyás, is a professional ice hockey player and has played with several Hungarian clubs in the Erste Liga.

She studied at Révai Miklós Gimnázium in Győr before moving to the United States to complete her secondary education and credits the school with providing a solid foundation in the English language.

As a child, Odnoga competed in equestrian sports at the national and regional levels, participating primarily in dressage and show jumping events.

== Career statistics ==
=== Regular season and playoffs ===
			Regular season					Playoffs
Season	Team	League	GP	G	A	Pts	PIM	GP	G	A	Pts	PIM
2013–14	KMH Budapest	EWHL	12	0	1	1	10	–	–	–	–	–
2014-15	KMH Budapest	EWHL	15	4	6	10	26	–	–	–	–	–
2018-19	Dartmouth Big Green	NCAA	29	2	10	12	42	–	–	–	–	–
2019-20	Dartmouth Big Green	NCAA	28	2	9	11	24	–	–	–	–	–
2020-21	Dartmouth Big Green	NCAA	0	0	0	0	0	–	–	–	–	–
2020-21	MAC Budapest	EWHL	6	1	3	4	2	2	0	1	1	0
2021-22	Dartmouth Big Green	NCAA	23	2	3	5	17	–	–	–	–	–
2022-23	St. Thomas Tommies	NCAA	34	2	3	5	12	–	–	–	–	—
EWHL totals			33	5	10	15	38	2	0	1	1	0

Sources: USCHO

=== International ===
Year	Team	Event	Result	GP	G	A	Pts	PIM
2014	Hungary U18	WW18	8th	5	0	0	0	4
2015	Hungary U18	WW18 D1	13th	5	1	2	3	4
2015	Hungary	WW D1B	18th	5	0	0	0	6
2016	Hungary U18	WW18 D1	13th	5	0	1	1	2
2016	Hungary	WW D1B	15th	5	0	0	0	0
2017	Hungary U18	WW18 D1A	12th	5	2	0	2	14
2017	Hungary	WW D1A	13th	5	0	0	0	16
2018	Hungary	WW D1A	11th	5	0	0	0	2
2019	Hungary	WW D1A	9th	5	0	3	3	2
2021	Hungary	WW	9th	4	0	1	1	4
2022	Hungary	WW	8th	6	0	0	0	2
2023	Hungary	WW	9th	4	0	1	1	4
Junior totals				20	3	3	6	24
Senior totals				39	0	5	5	36

== Awards and honors ==
- 2015 World U18 Championship – Division I, Best Player on Team
- 2015 Héraklész Program Best Female Ice Hockey Player
- 2019–20 All-Ivy League Honorable Mention
- 2021 IIHF Women's World Championship, Top-3 Player on Team as selected by coaches
- 2021–22 MJSZ Best Hungarian Women's Defenseman
