= Zsófia Tóth (ice hockey) =

Hungarian ice hockey player (born 2003)

- Born: 1 August 2003 (age 21); Budapest, Hungary
- Height: 1.66 m (5 ft 5 in)
- Weight: 65 kg (143 lb; 10 st 3 lb)
- Position: Goaltender
- Catches: Left
- EWHL team Former teams: HK Budapest; KMH Budapest
- National team: Hungary
- Playing career: 2017–present

Zsófia Tóth (born 1 August 2003) is a Hungarian ice hockey goaltender and member of the Hungarian national ice hockey team, currently playing with the women's representative team of Hokiklub Budapest in the European Women's Hockey League (EWHL). She was named the Hungarian Female Goaltender of the Year by the Hungarian Ice Hockey Federation (MJSZ) in 2021.

Tóth made her debut with the Hungarian senior national team at the 2021 IIHF Women's World Championship. As a member of the Hungarian national under-18 team, she participated in the IIHF Women's World U18 Championship Division I A tournaments in 2018, 2019, and 2020. At the 2019 tournament, Tóth was named best goaltender as selected by the directorate.

== Career statistics ==
=== International ===
Year	Team	Event	Result	GP	W	L	MIN	GA	SO	GAA	SV%
2018	Hungary U18	WW18 D1A	5th	4	1	3	243:55	12	0	2.95	.888
2019	Hungary U18	WW18 D1A	3rd	5	3	2	299:40	9	0	1.80	.945
2020	Hungary U18	WW18 D1A	3rd	5	2	3	315:00	7	0	1.33	.958
2021	Hungary	WW	9th	1	0	1	59:28	4	0	4.04	.889
Junior totals				14	6	8	858:35	28	0	1.96	.936

== Awards and honors ==
Award	Year	ref
European Women's Hockey League
EWHL Champion	2018–19, 2020–21	
International
World U18 D1A Best Goaltender	2019	
World U18 D1A Best Player on Team	2020	
Other
Hungarian Female Goaltender of the Year	2021	
