= Hartje (surname) =

Hartje is a surname. Notable people with the surname include:

- Chris Hartje (1915–1946), American baseball player
- Tod Hartje (born 1968), American ice hockey player
