= 2011 IIHF Women's World Championship Division III =

Tournament details
- Host country: Australia
- City: Newcastle
- Venue: 1 (in 1 host city)
- Dates: 1–6 February 2011
- Teams: 6

The 2011 IIHF Women's World Championship Division III was an international ice hockey tournament organized by the International Ice Hockey Federation. It was played in Newcastle, Australia, from 1 to 6 February 2011. Division III represented the fourth tier of the IIHF Women's World Championship.

The winner of this tournament was promoted to Division II (renamed I B) for the 2012 championships, while the last-placed team in the group was relegated to Division IV (renamed II B).

This tournament was the first at this level since 2008, and finished in dramatic style as the Netherlands won in a shootout. The top two ranked teams (Australia and the Netherlands), were both undefeated until they played each other on the final day, with Julie Zwarthoed scoring the decisive goal.

== Participating teams ==
Team	Qualification
Australia	hosts; placed 6th in 2008 Division II and were relegated
Netherlands	placed 6th in 2009 Division II and were relegated
Slovenia	placed 2nd in 2008 Division III
Croatia	placed 3rd in 2008 Division III
Belgium	placed 4th in 2008 Division III
Hungary	placed 5th in 2008 Division III

== Final standings ==
Pos	Team	Pld	W	OTW	OTL	L	GF	GA	GD	Pts	Promotion, qualification or relegation
1	Netherlands	5	4	1	0	0	33	4	+29	14	Promoted to the 2012 Division I B
2	Australia (H)	5	4	0	1	0	22	9	+13	13	Qualified for the 2012 Division II A
3	Hungary	5	2	1	0	2	27	11	+16	8	Qualified for the 2012 Division II A
4	Slovenia	5	2	0	1	2	19	16	+3	7	Qualified for the 2012 Division II A
5	Croatia	5	1	0	0	4	5	29	−24	3	Qualified for the 2012 Division II A
6	Belgium	5	0	0	0	5	3	40	−37	0	Relegated to the 2012 Division II B

Source: IIHF
(H) Host

== Match results ==
All times are local (Australian Eastern Standard Time – UTC+10).

1 February 2011; 13:00	Hungary	12–1 (7–1, 2–0, 3–0)	Croatia	HISS Arena

Game reference

1 February 2011; 16:30	Slovenia	0–3 (0–0, 0–2, 0–1)	Netherlands	HISS Arena

Game reference

1 February 2011; 20:00	Australia	7–1 (1–1, 4–0, 2–0)	Belgium	HISS Arena

Game reference

2 February 2011; 13:00	Netherlands	9–0 (1–0, 5–0, 3–0)	Croatia	HISS Arena

Game reference

2 February 2011; 16:30	Belgium	1–9 (1–0, 0–2, 0–7)	Hungary	HISS Arena

Game reference

2 February 2011; 20:00	Australia	7–4 (2–1, 3–2, 2–1)	Slovenia	HISS Arena

Game reference

3 February 2011; 13:00	Netherlands	13–0 (2–0, 7–0, 4–0)	Belgium	HISS Arena

Game reference

3 February 2011; 16:30	Slovenia	3–1 (3–0, 0–0, 0–1)	Croatia	HISS Arena

Game reference

3 February 2011; 20:00	Australia	1–0 (0–0, 1–0, 0–0)	Hungary	HISS Arena

Game reference

5 February 2011; 13–00	Belgium	1–9 (0–3, 1–3, 0–3)	Slovenia	HISS Arena

Game reference

5 February 2011; 16:30	Hungary	2–5 (1–1, 1–0, 0–4)	Netherlands	HISS Arena

Game reference

5 February 2011; 20:00	Croatia	1–5 (1–1, 0–1, 0–3)	Australia	HISS Arena

Game reference

6 February 2011; 13:00	Slovenia	3–4 (OT) (1–0, 1–2, 1–1) (0–1)	Hungary	HISS Arena

Game reference

6 February 2011; 16:30	Croatia	2–0 (1–0, 0–0, 1–0)	Belgium	HISS Arena

Game reference

6 February 2011; 20:00	Netherlands	3–2 (GWS) (0–0, 1–1, 1–1) (0–0, 1–0)	Australia	HISS Arena

Game reference

== Statistics ==
=== Scoring leaders ===
Pos	Player	Country	GP	G	A	Pts	+/−	PIM
1	Fanni Gasparics	Hungary	5	6	7	13	+10	2
2	Jasmina Rošar	Slovenia	5	6	6	12	+9	0
3	Natasha Farrier	Australia	5	7	4	11	+8	0
4	Savine Wielenga	Netherlands	5	6	4	10	+9	0
5	Alexandra Rónai	Hungary	5	6	3	9	+10	6
6	Pia Pren	Slovenia	5	7	1	8	+4	6
7	Jessie Tegelaar	Netherlands	5	6	2	8	+12	2
8	Mieneke de Jong	Netherlands	5	3	5	8	+7	4
9	Jose Schipper	Netherlands	5	5	2	7	+8	26
9	Kitti Trencsényi	Hungary	5	5	2	7	+4	12

GP = Games played; G = Goals; A = Assists; Pts = Points; +/− = Plus–minus; PIM = Penalties In Minutes
Source: IIHF.com

=== Goaltending leaders ===
(minimum 40% team's total ice time)

Pos	Player	Country	TOI	GA	GAA	Sv%	SO
1	Claudia van Leeuwen	Netherlands	210:29	4	1.14	96.12	1
2	Monika Gyömber	Hungary	180:00	7	2.33	94.74	0
3	Ashleigh Brown	Australia	296:53	9	1.82	93.08	1
4	Eszter Kökényesi	Hungary	122:27	4	1.96	92.86	0
5	Anja Jeršin-Grilc	Slovenia	289:37	15	3.11	91.18	0

TOI = Time On Ice (minutes:seconds); GA = Goals against; GAA = Goals against average; Sv% = Save percentage; SO = Shutouts
Source: IIHF.com

=== Directorate Awards ===
- Goaltender: Claudia van Leeuwen, Netherlands
- Defenseman: Kitti Trencsényi, Hungary
- Forward: Natasha Farrier, Australia

Source: IIHF.com
