= Regina Metzler =

Hungarian ice hockey player

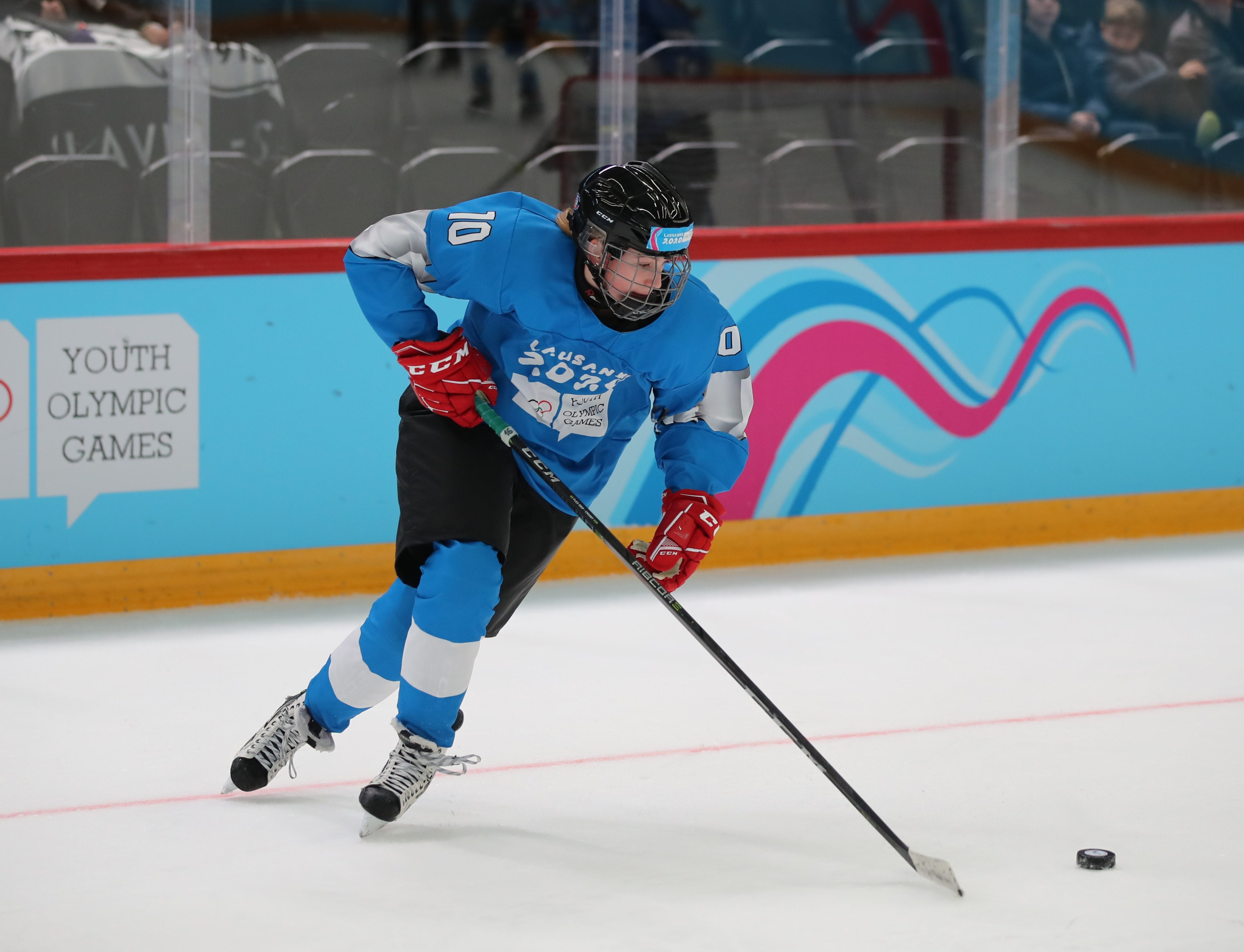
- Metzler at the 2020 Winter Youth Olympics
- Born: 25 October 2005 (age 20) Budapest, Hungary
- Height: 178 cm (5 ft 10 in)
- Weight: 73 kg (161 lb; 11 st 7 lb)
- Position: Forward
- Shoots: Left
- NCAA D1 team Former teams: Mercyhurst Lakers; KMH Budapest
- National team: Hungary
- Playing career: 2018–present

Regina Metzler (born 25 October 2005) is a Hungarian ice hockey player and member of the Hungarian national team. She plays college ice hockey with the Mercyhurst Lakers women's ice hockey program in the Atlantic Hockey America (AHA) conference of the NCAA Division I.

== Playing career ==
Metzler began her senior league career in the Women's Ice Hockey Bundesliga (DEBL) during the 2018–19 season with KMH Budapest II, the women's development team of KMH Budapest. She made her European Women's Hockey League (EWHL) debut with the women's representative team of KMH Budapest during the playoffs of the 2020–21 season and played part of the 2021–22 season with the team. Concurrent to her women's senior league career, she also played with Hungarian men's junior teams, including in the U.-16 I. Csoport with the U16 men's team of Vasas SC. During the 2021–22 season, she spent a month with the Hockey Training Institute (HTI) Stars women's under-20 team, based in Mulmur, Ontario, Canada.

== International play ==
At the 2020 Winter Youth Olympics, Metzler won a bronze medal in the girls' 3x3 mixed tournament with Team Blue Crystals, an international team of thirteen under-16 players that included Sidre Özer, who became the first Turkish ice hockey player to ever win an Olympic medal at the event.

With the Hungarian national under-18 team, she participated in the Division I Group A tournaments of the IIHF U18 Women's World Championship in 2020 and 2022. Aged fourteen years and two months, she was the youngest Hungarian player at the 2020 tournament and tied Petra Szamosfalvi for third in team scoring with 1 goal and 1 assist. The 2022 tournament was a breakout for Metzler, who led all tournament skaters in goals scored, with 5 goals in three games played, and recorded the tournament's best face-off percentage, at 75.41%. In recognition of her exemplary play in the 2022 tournament, she was selected as the Best Player of the Hungarian team by the coaches.

She served as captain of the Hungarian team in the girls' ice hockey tournament at the 2022 European Youth Olympic Winter Festival in Kainuu, Finland during March 2022.

Metzler represented Hungary at the IIHF Women's World Championship in 2021 and 2022. Though she was the youngest Hungarian player at the 2022 tournament, aged sixteen years and nine months, she ranked third on the team for points and tied Alexandra Huszák, the Hungarian national team's all-time top scorer, for second on the team in goals, scoring Hungary's only goal against the United States and slipping one past Anni Keisala of Finland, the 2021 World Championship Best Goaltender, for 2 goals in six games played.

== Career statistics ==
=== Regular season and playoffs ===
			Regular season					Playoffs
Season	Team	League	GP	G	A	Pts	PIM	GP	G	A	Pts	PIM
2018–19	KMH Budapest II	DEBL	6	3	5	8	2	1	0	0	0	0
2019–20	KMH Budapest II	DEBL	9	7	1	8	4	4	1	0	1	0
2019–20	KMH Budapest	EWHL	–	–	–	–	–	2	0	0	0	2
2020–21	KMH Budapest II	DEBL	7	7	2	9	2	2	0	0	0	0
2020–21	KMH Budapest	EWHL	–	–	–	–	–	2	0	0	0	0
2021–22	KMH Budapest	EWHL	5	1	1	2	0	–	–	–	–	–
2022–23	OHA Tardiff	OWHL	42	16	15	31	6	–	–	–	–	–
2023–24	OHA Mavericks	OWHL	57	16	28	44	8	–	–	–	–	–
OWHL totals			99	32	43	75	14	–	–	–	–	–

=== International ===
Year	Team	Event	Result	GP	G	A	Pts	PIM
2020	Hungary	U18 D1A	3rd	5	1	1	2	0
2021	Hungary	WC	9th	4	0	0	0	0
2022	Hungary	U18 D1A	4th	3	5	0	5	0
2022	Hungary	WC	8th	6	2	0	2	0
2023	Hungary	U18 D1A	4th	5	4	2	6	4
2023	Hungary	WC	9th	4	1	1	2	0
2024	Hungary	WC D1A	2nd	5	0	0	0	0
Junior totals				13	10	3	13	4
Senior totals				19	3	1	4	0
