= Fruzsina Mayer =

Hungarian ice hockey player (born 2000)

- Born: 16 July 2000 (age 26)
- Height: 168 cm (5 ft 6 in)
- Weight: 78 kg (172 lb; 12 st 4 lb)
- Position: Defense
- Shoots: Left
- EWHL team Former teams: HK Budapest; MAC Budapest
- National team: Hungary
- Playing career: 2015–present

Fruzsina Mayer (born 16 July 2000) is a Hungarian ice hockey player and member of the Hungarian national team, currently playing in the European Women's Hockey League (EWHL) with HK Budapest.

She represented Hungary at the IIHF Women's World Championship Top Division tournaments in 2021 and 2022.

== Career statistics ==
=== International ===
As of September 2022

Year	Team	Event	Result	GP	G	A	Pts	PIM
2015	Hungary U18	WW18 D1	5th	5	0	0	0	2
2016	Hungary U18	WW18 D1	5th	5	0	0	0	4
2016	Hungary	WW D1B	1st	5	0	0	0	4
2017	Hungary U18	WW18 D1A	4th	5	0	3	3	6
2017	Hungary	WW D1A	5th	5	0	0	0	0
2017	Hungary	OGQ	DNQ	3	0	0	0	2
2018	Hungary U18	WW18 D1A	5th	5	0	2	2	12
2018	Hungary	WW D1A	3rd	5	0	1	1	0
2019	Hungary	WW D1A	1st	3	0	0	0	0
2021	Hungary	WW	9th	4	0	0	0	4
2021	Hungary	OGQ	DNQ	3	0	0	0	2
2022	Hungary	WW	8th	6	0	2	2	0
Junior totals				20	0	5	5	24
Senior totals				28	0	3	3	8
