= Julie Zwarthoed =

Dutch ice hockey player (born 1994)

- Born: 25 September 1994 (age 32) Schinnen, Netherlands
- Height: 169 cm (5 ft 7 in)
- Weight: 75 kg (165 lb; 11 st 11 lb)
- Position: Right Wing
- Shoots: Right
- SDHL team Former teams: SDE Hockey; Smoke Eaters Geleen II; Team Netherlands (EWHL)
- National team: Netherlands
- Playing career: 2008–present

Julie Zwarthoed (born 25 September 1994) is a Dutch ice hockey winger and captain of SDE HF in the Swedish Women's Hockey League (SDHL). She has represented the Netherlands at nine IIHF World Championships.

== Playing career ==
Zwarthoed began playing ice hockey at age three with the youth department of VJB Smoke Eaters Geleen. She developed in the club throughout her childhood, eventually playing on their top junior team, the Smoke Eaters Geleen II in the Tweede Divisie from 2011 through 2015.

During the 2011–12 season, she also played in the Elite Women's Hockey League (EWHL; renamed European Women's Hockey League in 2019) with Team Netherlands.

In 2015, she signed with SDE Hockey in the Swedish Riksserien (renamed Swedish Women's Hockey League in 2016). The SDE roster already featured a Dutch national team player in Zoe Barbier, who had played the 2014–15 season with the club, and Zwarthoed signed alongside national team teammate Kayleigh Hamers to increase SDE's Netherlands contingent to three players.

She served as an alternate captain of SDE HF from the 2016–17 season through the 2022–23 season before being appointed to the captaincy in 2023.

As of the 2022–23 SDHL season, Zwarthoed was the leading point scorer in SDE HF history, having amassed 139 points in 275 games, and also held the record for most SDE goals scored, with 66 goals.

== International play ==
Zwarthoed has represented the Netherlands at nine IIHF World Championships: in the Division III tournament in 2011; the Division I Group B tournaments in 2012, 2013, 2014, 2015, and 2016; the Division II Group A tournaments in 2017 and 2018; and in the Division I Group A tournament in 2022. She also competed in the qualification tournament for the 2014 Winter Olympics in Sochi, the qualification tournament for the 2018 Winter Olympics in Pyeongchang, and the qualification tournament for the 2022 Winter Olympics in Beijing.

She was a member of Netherlands delegation at the 2012 Winter Youth Olympics in Innsbruck, where she won a gold medal in the girls' individual skills challenge. The jersey she wore during the skills competition is on display at the Hockey Hall of Fame.

== Career statistics ==
=== International ===
Year	Team	Event	Result	GP	G	A	Pts	PIM
2011	Netherlands	WW D3	1st	5	4	3	7	2
2012	Netherlands	WW D1B	5th	5	1	0	1	20
2013	Netherlands	OGQ	DNQ	6	3	5	8	12
2013	Netherlands	WW D1B	2nd	5	2	3	5	20
2014	Netherlands	WW D1B	4th	5	1	2	3	6
2015	Netherlands	WW D1B	2nd	5	2	0	2	4
2016	Netherlands	WW D1B	6th	5	1	1	2	29
2017	Netherlands	OGQ	DNQ	3	2	3	5	12
2017	Netherlands	WW D2A	2nd	5	3	5	8	2
2018	Netherlands	WW D2A	1st	5	5	6	11	2
2022	Netherlands	WW D1A	5th	4	2	2	4	4
2022	Netherlands	OGQ	DNQ	3	6	5	11	2
World Championship totals				47	21	22	23	89

== Awards ==
=== International ===
- Youth Olympic Gold Medal: 2012
- World Championship Division II Group A, Top Player on Team: 2017
- World Championship Division II Group A, Tournament Top Scorer: 2018

=== SDHL ===
- SDE Hockey regular season top scorer: 2019–20
