= Imola Horváth =

Hungarian ice hockey player

- Born: 2 August 2002 (age 24) Székesfehérvár, Hungary
- Height: 168 cm (5 ft 6 in)
- Weight: 76 kg (168 lb; 12 st 0 lb)
- Position: Forward
- Shoots: Left
- EWHL team Former teams: MAC Budapest; Göteborg HC
- National team: Hungary
- Playing career: 2016–present

Imola Horváth (born 2 August 2002) is a Hungarian ice hockey player and member of the Hungarian national ice hockey team. She plays in the European Women's Hockey League (EWHL) with the women's team of MAC Budapest.

She represented Hungary at the Top Division tournaments of the IIHF Women's World Championship in 2021, 2022, and 2023.

== Career statistics ==
=== International ===
| Year | Team | Event | Result | GP | G | A | Pts | PIM |
|---|---|---|---|---|---|---|---|---|
| 2017 | Hungary U18 | WC18 D1A | 4th | 5 | 1 | 0 | 1 | 0 |
| 2018 | Hungary U18 | WC18 D1A | 5th | 5 | 2 | 2 | 4 | 10 |
| 2019 | Hungary U18 | WC18 D1A | 3rd | 5 | 3 | 3 | 6 | 2 |
| 2020 | Hungary U18 | WC18 D1A | 3rd | 5 | 0 | 2 | 2 | 6 |
| 2021 | Hungary | WC | 9th | 4 | 0 | 0 | 0 | 2 |
| 2021 | Hungary | OGQ | DNQ | 3 | 1 | 1 | 2 | 4 |
| 2022 | Hungary | WC | 8th | 6 | 0 | 0 | 0 | 0 |
| 2023 | Hungary | WC | 9th | 4 | 0 | 0 | 0 | 0 |
| Junior totals | | | | 20 | 6 | 7 | 13 | 18 |
| Senior totals | | | | 14 | 0 | 0 | 0 | 2 |
