= Emma Kreisz =

Hungarian ice hockey player (born 2003)

- Born: 2 September 2003 (age 23) Budapest, Hungary
- Height: 175 cm (5 ft 9 in)
- Position: Forward
- Shoots: Left
- NCAA team Former teams: Minnesota; Stanstead Spartans; MAC Budapest; MAC Marilyn Budapest; Budapest U25 Select
- National team: Hungary
- Playing career: 2016–present

Emma Kreisz (born 2 September 2003) is a Hungarian ice hockey player and member of the Hungarian national team, currently playing college ice hockey for the Minnesota Golden Gophers women's ice hockey program in the Western Collegiate Hockey Association (WCHA) conference of the NCAA Division I. She previously played in the North American Prep Hockey Association (NAPHA) with the varsity team of Stanstead College

Kreisz represented Hungary at the 2021 IIHF Women's World Championship. As a member of the Hungarian national under-18 team, she participated in the Division 1 Group A tournaments of the IIHF Women's U18 World Championships in 2018, 2019, and 2020, serving as team captain in both 2019 and 2020.

== Career statistics ==
=== International ===
As of May 2022

Year	Team	Event	Result	GP	G	A	Pts	PIM
2018	Hungary U18	WW18 D1A	5th	5	1	0	1	6
2019	Hungary U18	WW18 D1A	3rd	5	2	8	10	6
2019	Hungary	WW D1A	1st	5	0	3	3	6
2020	Hungary U18	WW18 D1A	3rd	5	3	0	3	45
2021	Hungary	WW	9th	4	0	1	1	6
2021	Hungary	OGQ	DNQ	3	3	1	4	0
Junior totals				15	6	8	14	57
Senior totals				9	0	4	4	12
