= Elle Hartje =

American ice hockey player (born 2001)

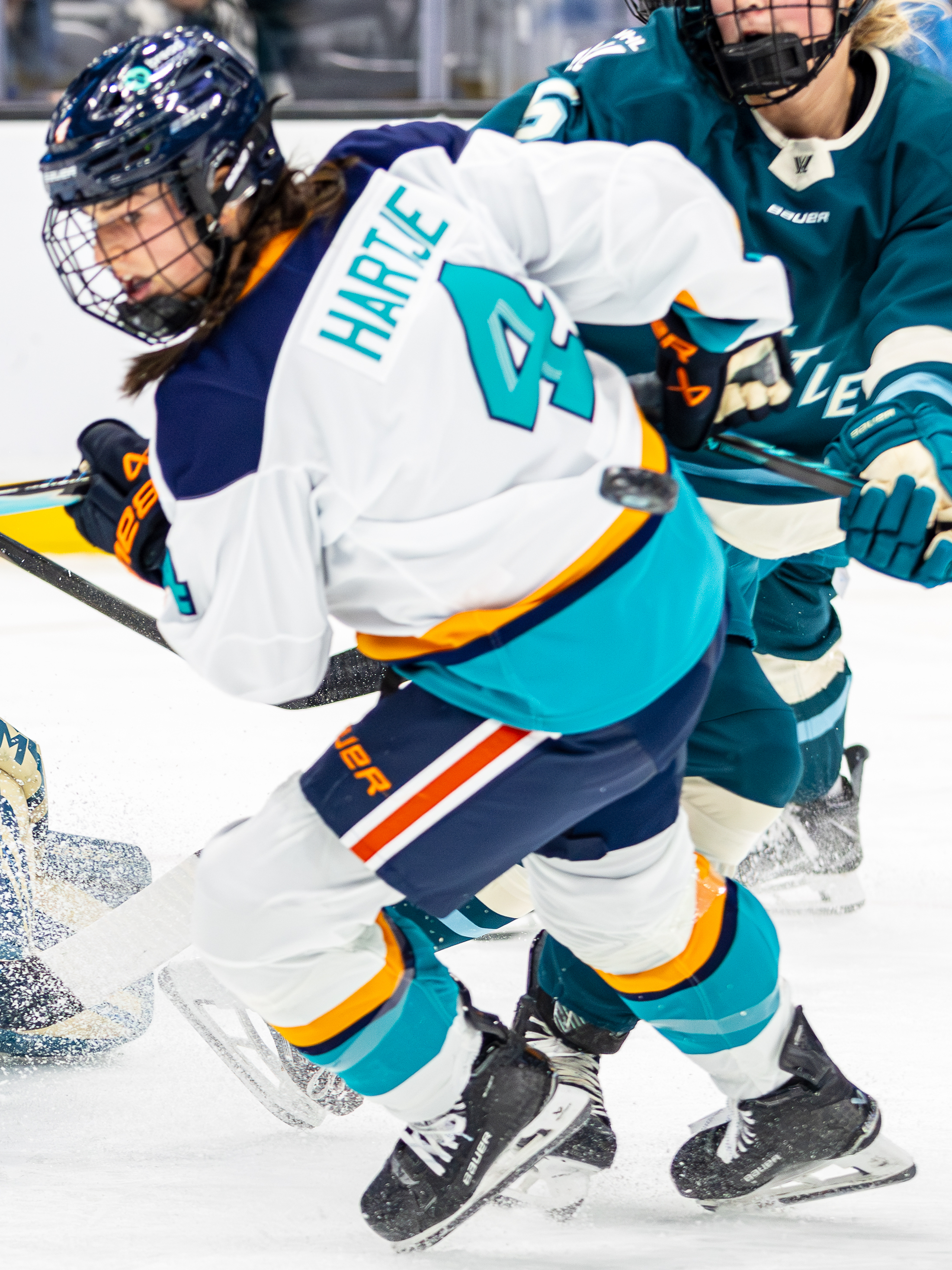
- Hartje with the New York Sirens in 2025
- Born: April 13, 2001 (age 25) Detroit, Michigan, U.S.
- Height: 5 ft 5 in (165 cm)
- Position: Center
- Shoots: Left
- PWHL team Former teams: New York Sirens; ŠKP Bratislava
- National team: Slovakia
- Playing career: 2024–present

Danielle "Elle" Hartje (born April 13, 2001) is an American professional ice hockey player who is a forward for the New York Sirens of the Professional Women's Hockey League (PWHL). She played college ice hockey at Yale.

== Playing career ==
=== College ===
Hartje played her college hockey at Yale. Following her rookie season at Yale, she played for HC ŠKP Bratislava in the European Women's Hockey League (EWHL), leading the team in points with 25.

Returning to the Bulldogs for the 2021–22 season, she broke Yale's record for most assists in a season with 35 and scored 51 points, the second most single-season points in Yale history. She led ECAC Hockey in points-per-game with 1.42. She was named first-team All-ECAC and first-team All-Ivy League while leading Yale to its first ever Frozen Four. In 2022–23, she averaged two points per game and broke her own Yale single-season assists record, recording 39 in a season. She was the NCAA statistical leader in assists per game with 1.18/game and was named an All-American. She was once again first-team All-ECAC and first-team All-Ivy. Yale won the Ivy League and Hartje was named Ivy League Player of the Year.

In 2023–24, Hartje served as the captain for Yale. She earned All-Ivy and All-ECAC honors and broke Yale's all-time scoring record which had stood for 35 years, graduating with 168 points in 129 games.

=== Professional ===
Entering the 2024 PWHL Draft, Hartje was projected as a top-20 pick by The Hockey News because of her 200-foot play, playmaking ability, and face-off prowess. She was drafted by the New York Sirens 25th overall. The Sirens signed her to a three-year contract following their preseason camp.

In 2026, Hartje became the first female ambassador for Hockey in New Jersey, a grassroots organization focused on growing participation in hockey. She joined fellow ambassadors Jack Hughes and Luke Hughes in supporting the organization's efforts to promote the sport and inspire the next generation of hockey players.

== International play ==
Hartje played as a member of the United States under-18 team at the U18 Series against Canada in 2018. And has twice represented the US as part of the U-22 team playing against Canada. She has also participated in USA Hockey Women's National Festivals and player development camps, most recently at the senior level in 2024.

Hartje played for the Slovak national team in 2021 against Austria, Germany, and the Czech Republic after she had lived in Slovakia for eight months and established residency. She received permission from USA Hockey to play with the team and is still eligible for the American national team player pool.

== Personal life ==
Hartje is one of four children of Tod Hartje and Nicole Hartje (née Rival). Both of her parents attended Harvard University, where her father played on the ice hockey team and her mother was captain of the tennis team. Her father went on to play professional ice hockey in the Soviet Championship League, the American Hockey League, and the International Hockey League, among others. Her maternal grandparents are from Bratislava, Slovakia.

She grew up in Bloomfield Hills, Michigan, a northern suburb of Detroit, and attended Detroit Country Day School. During high school, she played for Detroit Country Day's tennis and soccer teams and, ultimately, captained both teams. A four-time All-State selection in both sports, she was a Michigan Athlete of the Year and named High School Athlete of the Year by The Jewish News and the Michigan Jewish Sports Foundation.

She studied political science at Yale University and was a four-time Academic All-American. She was awarded ECAC Hockey's Mandi Schwartz Scholar-Athlete of the Year Award in 2024 for her on-ice skill and off-ice dedication to community service. Her community outreach included organizing volunteer work at the Yale Community Kitchen, a fundraiser for Court Appointed Special Advocates, and involvement with Yale's Student Athlete organizations. She was also a Sarah Devens Award recipient, an award given jointly by Hockey East and the ECAC to one player.

== Career statistics ==
			Regular season					Playoffs
Season	Team	League	GP	G	A	Pts	PIM	GP	G	A	Pts	PIM
2019–20	Yale University	ECAC	28	11	14	25	12	—	—	—	—	—
2020–21	ŠKP Bratislava	EWHL	16	11	14	25	8	—	—	—	—	—
2021–22	Yale University	ECAC	36	16	35	51	12	—	—	—	—	—
2022–23	Yale University	ECAC	33	13	39	52	6	—	—	—	—	—
2023–24	Yale University	ECAC	32	12	28	40	18	—	—	—	—	—
2024–25	New York Sirens	PWHL	27	0	6	6	6	—	—	—	—	—
2025–26	New York Sirens	PWHL	29	0	7	7	6	—	—	—	—	—
PWHL totals			56	0	13	13	12	—	—	—	—	—
