= Rocknet aréna =

Indoor sporting arena

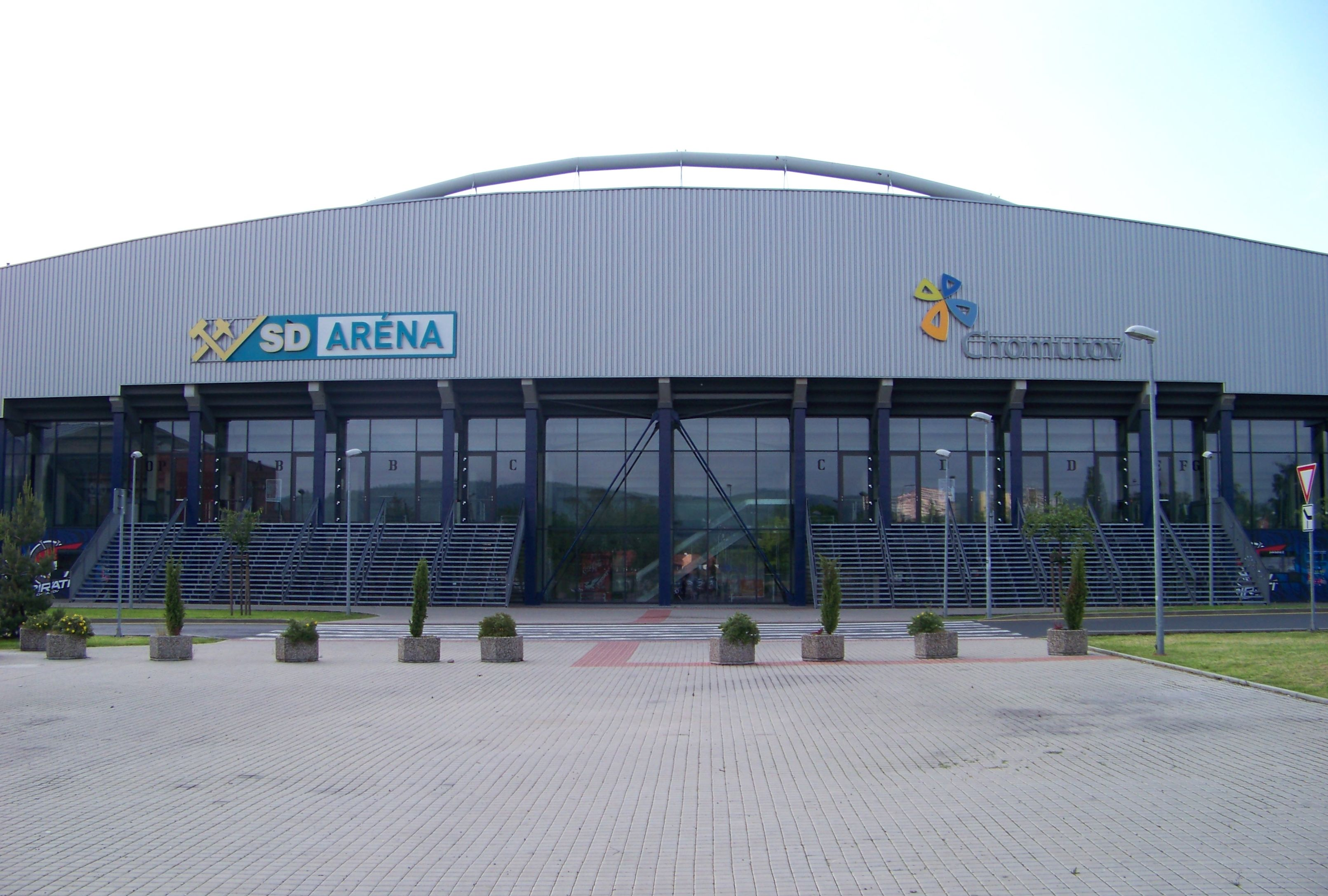
- Interactive map of Rocknet aréna
- Former names: SD Aréna
- Location: Mostecká 5773, Chomutov, Czech Republic, 430 01
- Coordinates: 50°28′04″N 13°25′35″E
- Owner: Chomutov
- Capacity: 4,500
- Field size: 28 m × 60 m (92 ft × 197 ft)

Construction
- Groundbreaking: May 2009
- Opened: April 2011

Tenants
- Piráti Chomutov (2011–); Rytíři Kladno (2021)

Rocknet aréna is an indoor sporting arena located in Chomutov, Czech Republic. The capacity of the arena is 5,250 people. It replaced ČEZ Stadion Chomutov as home of the ice hockey team Piráti Chomutov. The arena opened on 30 April 2011 with an exhibition match attended by over 5,000 people. The arena is part of a complex which was built on the site of former barracks.

The arena hosted two matches of the Czech Republic men's national volleyball team in 2014. In 2018, the arena, which had previously been known as SD Aréna after title sponsor Severočeské doly, took the new name of Rocknet aréna on a five-year naming rights deal.

In September 2021 the Czech Extraliga team Rytíři Kladno started playing matches at Rocknet aréna due to the reconstruction of their home arena in Kladno, for the 2021–22 season. The arena additionally hosted the final qualification group for women's ice hockey at the 2022 Winter Olympics in 2021.
