= Carina Strobel =

German ice hockey player (born 1997)

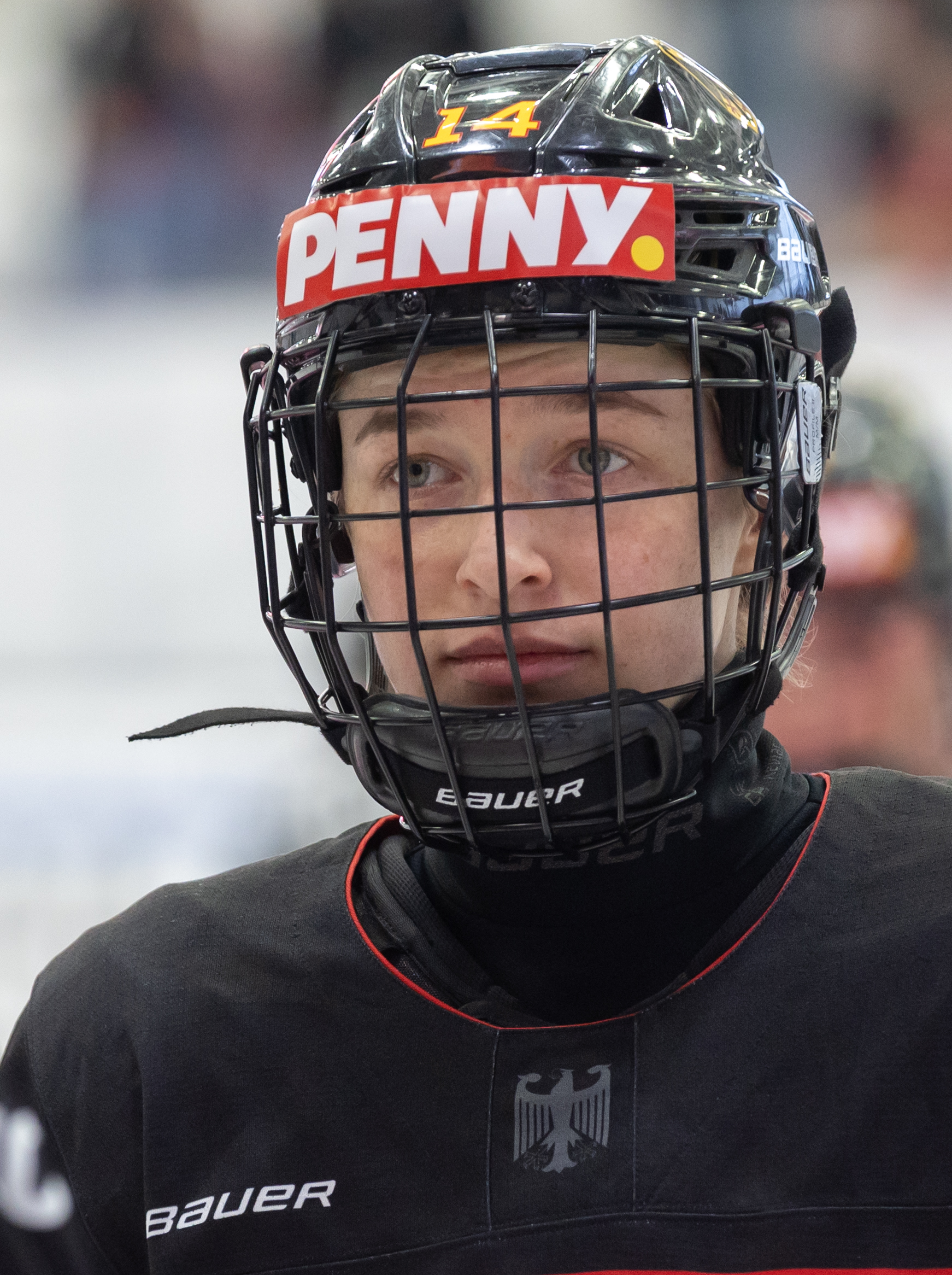
- Strobel in 2026
- Born: 11 September 1997 (age 28) Landsberg am Lech, Germany
- Height: 1.72 m (5 ft 8 in)
- Weight: 60 kg (132 lb; 9 st 6 lb)
- Position: Defence
- Shoots: Left
- DFEL team: Memmingen Indians
- National team: Germany
- Playing career: 2015–present

Carina Strobel (born 11 September 1997) is a German ice hockey player for the Memmingen Indians and the German national team.

== Playing career ==
=== International ===
She participated at the 2015 IIHF Women's World Championship.

With Germany making their first appearance in women's ice hockey at the Olympics since 2014, the February 5, 2026 match versus Sweden meant that every member of the German roster were making their Olympic debut.

She recorded an assist on Katarina Jobst-Smith's goal, plus 22:10 of ice time in a 4-1 loss to Sweden.
