= Tod Hartje =

American ice hockey player (born 1968)

- Born: February 27, 1968 (age 58) Anoka, Minnesota, US
- Height: 6 ft 1 in (185 cm)
- Weight: 190 lb (86 kg; 13 st 8 lb)
- Position: Center
- Shot: Left
- Played for: Sokil Kyiv; Fort Wayne Komets; Moncton Hawks; Providence Bruins; Adirondack Red Wings; Nashville Knights; Minnesota Moose; Atlanta Knights; Dayton Bombers; Toledo Storm
- Current MHSAA coach: Detroit Country Day
- NHL draft: 142nd overall, 1987; Winnipeg Jets
- Playing career: 1990–2003
- Coaching career: 2023–present

Tod Hartje (born February 27, 1968) is a retired ice hockey center. Hartje was the first North American trained player to play in the Soviet Championship League in 1990 with Sokil Kyiv. He would also play for several teams in the American Hockey League, International Hockey League and East Coast Hockey League.

== Personal life ==
Hartje and his wife, Nicole (née Rival), have four children: Jake (born 1996), Sasha (born 1999), Elle (born 2001), and Clay. Three of their children followed in their father's footsteps and played college ice hockey. Elle Hartje has played professional ice hockey in the Professional Women's Hockey League since 2024.

== Career statistics ==
			Regular season					Playoffs
Season	Team	League	GP	G	A	Pts	PIM	GP	G	A	Pts	PIM
1986–87	Harvard University	NCAA	34	3	9	12	36	—	—	—	—	—
1987–88	Harvard University	NCAA	32	5	17	22	40	—	—	—	—	—
1988–89	Harvard University	NCAA	33	4	17	21	40	—	—	—	—	—
1989–90	Harvard University	NCAA	28	6	10	16	29	—	—	—	—	—
1990–91	Sokil Kyiv	Soviet	32	2	4	6	18	—	—	—	—	—
1990–91	ShVSM Kyiv	Soviet3	3	1	1	2	0	—	—	—	—	—
1990–91	Fort Wayne Komets	IHL	1	1	0	1	2	—	—	—	—	—
1991–92	Moncton Hawks	AHL	38	9	9	18	35	—	—	—	—	—
1992–93	Moncton Hawks	AHL	29	3	7	10	2	—	—	—	—	—
1992–93	Fort Wayne Komets	IHL	5	1	2	3	6	—	—	—	—	—
1992–93	Providence Bruins	AHL	29	2	14	16	32	4	1	0	1	20
1993–94	Providence Bruins	AHL	80	22	27	49	157	—	—	—	—	—
1994–95	Nashville Knights	ECHL	25	13	26	39	74	—	—	—	—	—
1994–95	Minnesota Moose	IHL	6	1	1	2	6	—	—	—	—	—
1994–95	Atlanta Knights	IHL	2	0	0	0	0	—	—	—	—	—
1994–95	Adirondack Red Wings	AHL	31	6	10	16	33	4	0	0	0	4
1995–96	Providence Bruins	AHL	77	19	22	41	106	4	1	3	4	14
1996–97	Dayton Bombers	ECHL	4	2	1	3	6	—	—	—	—	—
1997–98	Dayton Bombers	ECHL	3	1	0	1	6	—	—	—	—	—
2001–02	Toledo Storm	ECHL	6	0	1	1	8	—	—	—	—	—
2002–03	Toledo Storm	ECHL	1	0	0	0	0	—	—	—	—	—
AHL totals			284	61	89	150	365	12	2	3	5	38
