= Kinga Jókai Szilágyi =

Hungarian ice hockey player (born 1997)

- Born: 19 August 1997 (age 29)
- Height: 1.70 m (5 ft 7 in)
- Weight: 66 kg (146 lb; 10 st 6 lb)
- Position: Left wing
- Shoots: Left
- NDHL team Former teams: SKN Sabres St. Pölten: Skellefteå AIK; MAC Budapest; EHV Sabres Vienna; KMH Budapest; Luleå HF/MSSK; SC Weinfelden
- National team: Hungary
- Playing career: 2011–present

Kinga Jókai Szilágyi (born 19 August 1997) is a Hungarian ice hockey player and member of the Hungarian national ice hockey team. She plays in the European Women's Hockey League (EWHL) with SKN Sabres St. Pölten.

== Playing career ==
Jókai Szilágyi began her senior club career with the women's representative team of KMH Budapest in the Elite Women's Hockey League (EWHL; renamed from Elite to European in 2019). She has gone on to play with SC Weinfelden in the Swiss Leistungsklasse A (LKA), Luleå HF/MSSK in the Swedish Women's Hockey League (SDHL), the EHV Sabres (reformed as SKN Sabres St. Pölten in 2023) in the EWHL and Austrian National Championship league, MAC Budapest in the EWHL, and Skellefteå AIK in the Swedish Nationella Damhockeyligan (NDHL).

== International play ==
Jókai Szilágyi represented Hungary at four IIHF Women's U18 World Championships, appearing in the Division I tournaments in 2012 and 2015, and in the Top Division tournaments in 2013 and 2014.

Her first tournament with the senior national team was the 2013 IIHF Women's World Championship Division II A, in which Hungary secured promotion to the Division I B. She appeared at the Division I B tournaments in 2014, 2015, and 2016, and at the Division I A tournaments in 2017, 2018, and 2019.

At the 2021 IIHF Women's World Championship, she was a member of the first women's national team to represent Hungary at the Top Division level and was the team's second-highest point leader behind Fanni Gasparics, with one goal and three assists for four points in four games.

== Personal life ==
Her older sister, Zsófia Jókai Szilágyi, was a member of the Hungarian national ice hockey team from 2010 until 2021, when a back injury forced her to retire from elite play at age 28.

== Career statistics ==
=== International ===
Year	Team	Event	Result	GP	G	A	Pts	PIM
2012	Hungary U18	WC18 D1	2nd	5	0	0	0	2
2013	Hungary U18	WC18	6th	5	0	2	2	4
2013	Hungary	WC D2A	1st	5	0	2	2	0
2014	Hungary U18	WC18	8th	5	0	1	1	0
2014	Hungary	WC D1B	3rd	5	0	0	0	0
2015	Hungary U18	WC18 D1	5th	5	1	2	3	4
2015	Hungary	WC D1B	4th	5	0	1	1	2
2016	Hungary	WC D1B	1st	5	0	1	1	0
2016	Hungary	OGQ	DNQ	1	0	0	0	0
2017	Hungary	WC D1A	5th	5	1	0	1	0
2018	Hungary	WC D1A	3rd	5	0	1	1	0
2019	Hungary	WC D1A	1st	5	0	0	0	0
2021	Hungary	WC	9th	4	1	3	4	0
2022	Hungary	WC	8th	6	1	1	2	2
2023	Hungary	WC	9th	4	0	0	0	2
Junior totals				20	1	5	6	10
Senior totals				39	2	8	10	2
