= Réka Dabasi =

Hungarian ice hockey player (born 1996)

- Born: 24 December 1996 (age 28); Budapest, Hungary
- Height: 1.69 m (5 ft 7 in)
- Weight: 59 kg (130 lb; 9 st 4 lb)
- Position: Forward
- Shoots: Left
- EWHL team Former teams: HK Budapest; Metropolitan Riveters; KMH Budapest
- National team: Hungary
- Playing career: 2009–present

Réka Dabasi (born 24 December 1996) is a Hungarian ice hockey player and member of the Hungarian national team. She plays in the European Women's Hockey League (EWHL) with Hokiklub Budapest.

In July 2021, she was selected second overall by the Toronto Six in the inaugural NWHL International Draft and, in May 2022, she became the first Hungarian player to sign with a Premier Hockey Federation (PHF; called NWHL until 2021) team after signing a contract with the Metropolitan Riveters for the 2022–23 season.

== Playing career ==
Dabasi has represented Hungary at ten IIHF World Women's Championships – twice at the Division II A level, three times at the Division I B level, three times at the Division I A level, and at the Top Division tournaments in 2021 and 2022. She scored the first goal at the World Championship Top Division level in Hungarian women's national team history in the second game of the 2021 World Championship preliminary round, a matchup between Hungary and the Czech Republic.

With the Hungarian national under-18 team, Dabasi participated in the IIHF Women's U18 World Championships in 2013 and 2014.

== Career statistics ==
=== International ===
As of May 2022

Year	Team	Event	Result	GP	G	A	Pts	PIM
2011	Hungary U18	WW18 D1Q	1st	5	3	3	6	0
2012	Hungary U18	WW18 D1	1st	5	1	0	1	2
2012	Hungary	WW D2A	2nd	5	2	1	3	0
2012	Hungary	OGQ	DNQ	3	2	2	4	0
2013	Hungary U18	WW18	6th	5	0	0	0	4
2013	Hungary	WW D2A	1st	5	1	1	2	2
2014	Hungary U18	WW18	8th	5	0	0	0	0
2014	Hungary	WW D1B	3rd	5	1	2	3	2
2015	Hungary	WW D1B	4th	5	2	2	4	2
2016	Hungary	WW D1B	1st	5	2	1	3	0
2016	Hungary	OGQ	DNQ	3	0	3	3	0
2017	Hungary	WW D1A	5th	5	1	0	1	4
2018	Hungary	WW D1A	3rd	5	1	2	3	0
2019	Hungary	WW D1A	1st	5	2	1	3	0
2021	Hungary	WW	9th	4	1	0	1	0
2021	Hungary	OGQ	DNQ	3	0	1	1	0
Junior totals				20	4	3	7	6
Senior totals				51	15	15	30	10
