= Franziska Feldmeier =

German ice hockey player (born 1999)

- Born: 5 February 1999 (age 27) Munich, Germany
- Height: 1.65 m (5 ft 5 in)
- Weight: 70 kg (154 lb; 11 st 0 lb)
- Position: Forward
- Shoots: Right
- DFEL team Former teams: Eisbaren Juniors Berlin; ECDC Memmingen; Linkoping HC
- National team: Germany
- Playing career: 2012–present

Franziska Feldmeier (born 5 February 1999) is a German ice hockey player. She is a member of the Germany women's national ice hockey team that participated in women's ice hockey tournament at the 2026 Winter Olympics.

== Playing career ==
=== International ===
In the third game of Group B preliminary round play at the 2024 IIHF Women's World Championship, Feldmeier scored the game winning goal in third period versus Sweden in an 8 April match. With the win, Germany clinched first place in Group B competition.

With Germany making their first appearance in women's ice hockey at the Olympics since 2014, the 5 February 2026 match versus Sweden meant that every member of the German roster were making their Olympic debut. Feldmeier, wearing number 7, logged 16 minutes of ice time in a 4–1 loss to Sweden.

In the 2026 Olympic quarterfinals against Canada, Franziska Feldmeier scored on Emerance Maschmeyer in a 5–1 loss on 14 February. It was the first ever goal for Germany versus Canada in senior play.

== In popular culture ==
Feldmeier appeared in a pictorial for the Olympic edition of the German Playboy magazine, cover date March 2026. She appeared in the edition to make women, especially a sporty or muscular woman, feel more confident about their bodies. Also appearing in the issue is German bobsledder Vanessa Mark. Two covers were published for the issue, with one featuring Feldmeier while the other had Mark.

== Awards and Honors ==
- Player of the Game (Germany) - 6 April 2024 versus Japan - 2024 IIHF Women's World Championships
