= Hungary women's national ice hockey team =

Hungary
- Nickname: Magyar
- Association: Hungarian Ice Hockey Federation
- General manager: Judit Jaso
- Head coach: Delaney Collins
- Assistants: Kristi Kehoe
- Captain: Lotti Odnoga
- Most games: Lotti Odnoga (159)
- Top scorer: Alexandra Huszák (69)
- Most points: Fanni Garát-Gasparics (121)
- Team colors
- IIHF code: HUN

Ranking
- Current IIHF: 9 (3 June 2026)
- Highest IIHF: 9 (2022)
- Lowest IIHF: 27 (2010)

First international
- Hungary 6–0 South Africa (Székesfehérvár, Hungary; 19 March 1999)

Biggest win
- Hungary 14–1 South Africa; Sheffield, Great Britain; 10 March 2007)

Biggest defeat
- France 17–0 Hungary (Tilburg, Netherlands; 9 February 2002)

World Championships
- Appearances: 22 (first in 1999)
- Best result: 8th (2022)

International record (W–L–T)
- 134–128–1

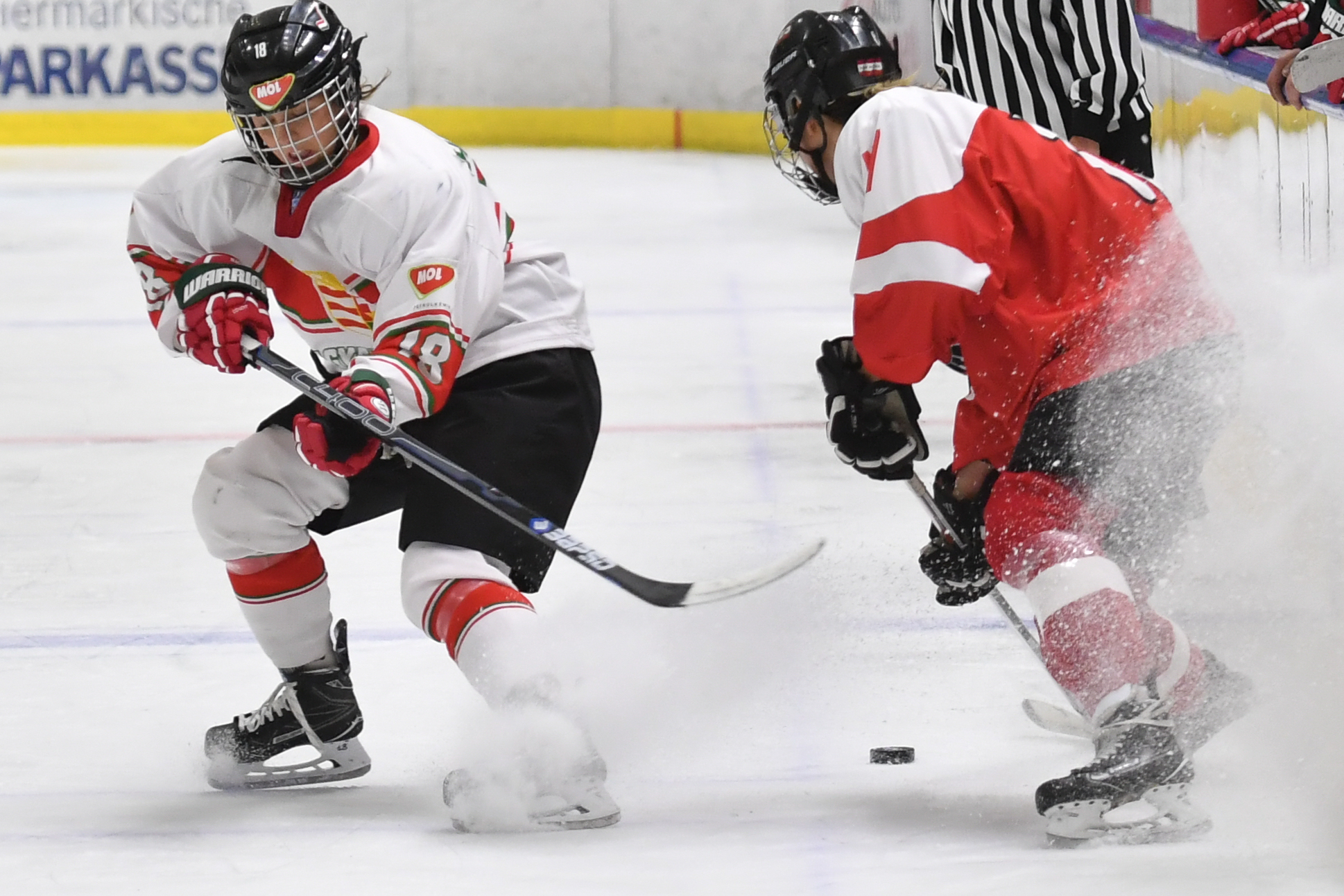

The Hungarian women's national ice hockey team (Hungarian: Magyar női jégkorong-válogatott) represents Hungary at the International Ice Hockey Federation (IIHF) Women's World Championship and other senior international women's tournaments. The women's national team is organized by the Magyar Jégkorong Szövetség (Hungarian Ice Hockey Federation). The Hungarian women's national team was ranked 12th in the world in 2020. They hosted and won the 2019 World Championship Division I Group A tournament in Budapest. The victory earned promotion to the Top Division for the first time in team history.

Ice hockey increased in popularity among women in Hungary during the later part of the 2010s. Hungary had 477 female players registered with the IIHF in 2016 and, by 2020, the number had more than doubled to 1,144.

== Tournament record ==
=== Olympic ===
The Hungarian women's hockey team has never qualified for an Olympic tournament.

=== World Championships ===
- 1999 – Not ranked (3rd in 2000 Group B Qualification Pool A)
- 2000 – Finished in 22nd place
- 2001 – Finished in 24th place
- 2003 – Finished in 24th place (4th in Division III)
- 2004 – Finished in 24th place (3rd in Division III)
- 2005 – Finished in 24th place (4th in Division III)
- 2007 – Finished in 25th place (4th in Division III)
- 2008 – Finished in 26th place (5th in Division III)
- 2009 – Division III canceled
- 2011 – Finished in 22nd place (3rd in Division III)
- 2012 – Finished in 22nd place (2nd in Division IIA)
- 2013 – Finished in 21st place (1st in Division IIA, Promoted to Division IB)
- 2014 – Finished in 17th place (3rd in Division IB)
- 2015 – Finished in 18th place (4th in Division IB)
- 2016 – Finished in 15th place (1st in Division IB, Promoted to Division IA)
- 2017 – Finished in 13th place (5th in Division IA)
- 2018 – Finished in 12th place (3rd in Division IA)
- 2019 – Finished in 11th place (1st in Division IA, Promoted to Top Division)
- 2020 – Cancelled due to the COVID-19 pandemic
- 2021 – Finished in 9th place
- 2022 – Finished in 8th place
- 2023 – Finished in 9th place (relegated to Division IA)
- 2024 – Finished in 12th place (2nd in Division IA, Promoted to Top Division)
- 2025 – Finished in 10th place (relegated to Division IA)
- 2026 – Finished in 12th place (2nd in Division IA)

== Team ==
=== Current roster ===
The roster for the 2025 IIHF Women's World Championship, as published on 7 April 2025.

Head coach: Pat Cortina

| No. | Pos. | Name | Height | Weight | Birthdate | Team |
|---|---|---|---|---|---|---|
| 1 | G | Anikó Németh | 1.65 m (5 ft 5 in) | 61 kg (134 lb) | 6 September 1996 (age 29) | (Hungary) Budapest JA |
| 2 | D | Bernadett Németh | 1.65 m (5 ft 5 in) | 56 kg (123 lb) | 6 September 1996 (age 29) | (Kazakhstan) Aisulu Almaty |
| 4 | D | Taylor Baker | 1.65 m (5 ft 5 in) | 66 kg (146 lb) | 30 July 1997 (age 29) | (Sweden) Brynäs IF |
| 6 | D | Lili Hajdu | 1.75 m (5 ft 9 in) | 69 kg (152 lb) | 6 January 2009 (age 17) | (Hungary) Budapest JA |
| 7 | F | Zsófia Pázmándi | 1.65 m (5 ft 5 in) | 65 kg (143 lb) | 16 December 2002 (age 23) | (United States) Lindenwood Lady Lions |
| 8 | D | Isabel Lippai | 1.65 m (5 ft 5 in) | 60 kg (130 lb) | 25 June 2002 (age 24) | (Hungary) MAC Budapest |
| 9 | F | Krisztina Weiler | 1.64 m (5 ft 5 in) | 65 kg (143 lb) | 1 January 2008 (age 18) | (Canada) Ontario Hockey Academy |
| 10 | F | Imola Horváth | 1.68 m (5 ft 6 in) | 76 kg (168 lb) | 2 August 2002 (age 24) | (Sweden) Södertalje SK |
| 11 | F | Fanni Gasparics – C | 1.67 m (5 ft 6 in) | 61 kg (134 lb) | 20 November 1994 (age 31) | (Sweden) Brynäs IF |
| 12 | F | Petra Polónyi | 1.70 m (5 ft 7 in) | 65 kg (143 lb) | 25 September 2008 (age 17) | (Canada) Ontario Hockey Academy |
| 13 | D | Lotti Odnoga – A | 1.74 m (5 ft 9 in) | 71 kg (157 lb) | 19 January 1999 (age 27) | (Sweden) SDE HF |
| 14 | D | Franciska Kiss-Simon | 1.80 m (5 ft 11 in) | 74 kg (163 lb) | 7 November 1995 (age 30) | (Hungary) HK Budapest |
| 15 | F | Réka Dabasi – A | 1.68 m (5 ft 6 in) | 59 kg (130 lb) | 24 December 1996 (age 29) | (Hungary) HK Budapest |
| 17 | F | Madeline Leidt | 1.70 m (5 ft 7 in) | 70 kg (150 lb) | 7 October 1998 (age 27) | (Hungary) HK Budapest |
| 18 | F | Alexandra Huszák | 1.73 m (5 ft 8 in) | 61 kg (134 lb) | 18 June 1995 (age 31) | (Hungary) MAC Budapest |
| 23 | F | Réka Hiezl | 1.69 m (5 ft 7 in) | 60 kg (130 lb) | 10 June 2009 (age 17) | (Hungary) Vasas SC U16 |
| 31 | G | Zoé Takács | 1.67 m (5 ft 6 in) | 67 kg (148 lb) | 25 August 2008 (age 17) | (Hungary) MAC Budapest |
| 33 | G | Zsuzsa Révész | 1.65 m (5 ft 5 in) | 83 kg (183 lb) | 17 August 2005 (age 20) | (United States) North American Hockey Academy |
| 41 | F | Boglárka Báhiczki-Tóth | 1.82 m (6 ft 0 in) | 80 kg (180 lb) | 11 October 2007 (age 18) | (Canada) Purcell Hockey Academy |
| 71 | D | Fruzsina Mayer | 1.68 m (5 ft 6 in) | 73 kg (161 lb) | 16 July 2000 (age 26) | (Hungary) HK Budapest |
| 72 | F | Míra Seregély | 1.76 m (5 ft 9 in) | 66 kg (146 lb) | 27 April 2003 (age 23) | (United States) Maine Black Bears |
| 77 | F | Regina Metzler | 1.78 m (5 ft 10 in) | 80 kg (180 lb) | 25 October 2005 (age 20) | (United States) Mercyhurst Lakers |
| 88 | F | Emma Kreisz | 1.75 m (5 ft 9 in) | 73 kg (161 lb) | 2 September 2003 (age 22) | (United States) Minnesota Golden Gophers |
| 91 | D | Lorina Haraszt | 1.64 m (5 ft 5 in) | 62 kg (137 lb) | 5 March 2008 (age 18) | (Hungary) IOGJA |
| 97 | F | Kinga Jókai-Szilágyi | 1.68 m (5 ft 6 in) | 65 kg (143 lb) | 19 August 1997 (age 28) | (Austria) SKN Sabres St. Pölten |

=== Head coaches ===
- Tibor Balogh (1997–1999)
- Bence Vadócz (1999–2001)
- Vladimir Matejov (2001–2002)
- Tibor Balogh (2002–2005)
- László Pindák (2006–2007)
- András Kis (2007–2009)
- Csaba Gömöri (2011–2014)
- Dwayne Gylywoychuk (2015)
- Tibor Marton (2015–2018)
- Jari Risku (2018–2019)
- Pat Cortina (2019–2020)
- Lisa Haley (2020–2021)
- Pat Cortina (2022–)

=== Awards and honors ===
- Fanni Gasparics, Directorate Award, Best Forward, 2019 IIHF Women's World Championship Division I
