= KMH Budapest =

Kanadai Magyar Hokiklub SE
- City: Budapest, Hungary
- League: 2.Liga
- Founded: 2006
- Home arena: Tüskecsarnok
- Colors: Red, white, black
- General manager: Attila Andras
- Head coach: Otto Benczenleitner
- Website: kmh.sport.hu

Kanadai Magyar Hokiklub SE is a men's ice hockey team. They were formed in 2006. They play in the city of Budapest, Hungary at Tüske Hall Budapest. They joined the Slovak third-tier 2. Liga in 2016.
