= Hungarian Ice Hockey Federation =

Ice hockey governing body in Hungary

Hungary
- Association name: Hungarian Ice Hockey Federation
- IIHF Code: HUN
- IIHF membership: January 24, 1927
- President: Miklós Németh
- IIHF men's ranking: 16 (26 May 2025)
- IIHF women's ranking: 9 (21 April 2025)

The Hungarian Ice Hockey Federation (Hungarian: Magyar Jégkorong Szövetség, pronounced [ˈmɒɟɒr ˈjeːkːoroŋɡ ˈsøvɛt͡ʃːeːɡ], MJSZ) is the governing body of ice hockey in Hungary. The federation was founded under the leadership of György Pásztor in 1988, when it separated from the Hungarian Ice Sports Association. He felt that to improve ice hockey in Hungary, a stronger national league was needed, which required more youths, more arenas, and proper leadership.

== Notable people ==
- György Pásztor, vice-president (1988 to 1994) and IIHF Hall of Fame inductee.
- Zoltán Kovács, vice-president (since 2017) and Paul Loicq Award recipient.
