= Fanni Garát-Gasparics =

Hungarian ice hockey player (born 1994)

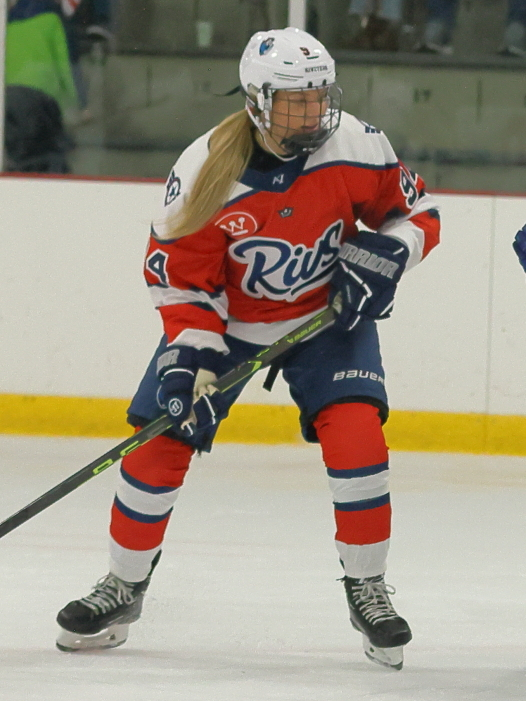
- Garát-Gasparics with the Metropolitan Riveters in 2022
- Born: 20 November 1994 (age 31) Budapest, Hungary
- Height: 1.67 m (5 ft 6 in)
- Weight: 63 kg (139 lb; 9 st 13 lb)
- Position: Forward
- Shoots: Right
- SDHL team Former teams: Brynäs IF: PWHL Ottawa; Metropolitan Riveters; MAC Budapest; KMH Budapest; Agidel Ufa; Belye Medveditsy Chelyabinsk; Fakel Chelyabinsk
- National team: Hungary
- Playing career: 2010–present
Medal record
Winter Youth Olympics
Silver medal – second place	2012 Innsbruck	Skills challenge
World Championship Division I
Gold medal – first place	2019 Hungary

Fanni Garát-Gasparics née Gasparics (born 20 November 1994) is a Hungarian professional ice hockey forward for Brynäs IF of the Swedish Women's Hockey League (SDHL), and a member of Hungary women's national ice hockey team.

== Playing career ==
She was selected by the Minnesota Whitecaps in the 2021 NWHL International Draft on 25 July 2021. She joined the Metropolitan Riveters for the 2022-23 season, and spent one season with them before the dissolution of the PHF. She went undrafted in the 2023 PWHL draft, but ended up signing with PWHL Ottawa for the 2023-24 season. She would play in 15 games for Ottawa before suffering an injury during their March 5 game against PWHL Minnesota and missing the remainder of the season.

=== International play ===
Garát-Gasparics represented Hungary at the 2012 IIHF World Women's U18 Championship – Division I and was a standout player on the team as they claimed gold in the tournament and gained promotion to the Top Division. Hungary, a newcomer to the World U18 stage, went undefeated in the tournament to produce what was long considered the greatest success in the history of Hungarian women's ice hockey. Garát-Gasparics ranked second in scoring of all players participating in the tournament, with 2 goals and 8 assists for 10 points, only trailing linemate Alexandra Huszák's 7 goals and 3 assists.

In January 2012, Garát-Gasparics also represented Hungary at the first ever Winter Youth Olympics, competing in the individual skills challenge, where she came second and collected the silver medal.

== Awards and honors ==
- Directorate Award, Best Forward, 2019 IIHF Women's World Championship Division I
