= 2026 IIHF Women's World Championship =

2026 edition of the Women's Ice Hockey World Championship

Tournament details
- Host country: Denmark
- Cities: Herning; Esbjerg
- Venues: 2 (in 2 host cities)
- Dates: 6–16 November
- Teams: 10

Final positions
- Champions: United States (12th title)
- Runners-up: Canada
- Third place: Sweden
- Fourth place: Finland

Tournament statistics
- Games played: 29
- Goals scored: 171 (5.9 per game)
- Attendance: 20,787 (717 per game)
- Scoring leader: (United States) Caroline Harvey (16 points)

Awards
- MVP: (United States) Caroline Harvey

Official website
- www.iihf.com

The 2026 IIHF Women's World Championship was the 25th edition of the Top Division of the Women's Ice Hockey World Championship organized by the International Ice Hockey Federation (IIHF). The tournament was contested in Herning and Esbjerg, Denmark from 6 to 16 November 2026.

The United States won their 12th title, after a 6–2 win in the final against Canada.

== Host selection ==
The following two countries chose to bid:

- Canada
- Denmark

Due to scheduling issues, the hosts announcement was delayed to October 2025. On 3 October 2025, Denmark was awarded the hosting rights at the Semi Annual Congress in Nice, with Herning and a then-unknown second city hosting the tournament, later announced to be Esbjerg. This marks Denmark's second time hosting after 2022.

== Participants ==
Ten teams took part in the competition for the seventh time. Hungary and Norway were immediately relegated back to Division I after only appearing in the 2025 edition. They were replaced by Division I champions Austria, who made their debut in the top division, and runners-up, Denmark, who secured their immediate promotion back to the top division. Denmark would later be awarded the hosting rights as well.

Qualification	Host	Dates	Vacancies	Qualified
Top eight in 2025	(Czech Republic) České Budějovice	9–20 April 2025	8	United States; Canada; Finland; Czechia; Switzerland; Sweden; Japan; Germany
Promoted from Division I	(China) Shenzhen	13–19 April 2025	2	Austria; Denmark (H)

=== Summary of qualified teams ===
Team	Qualification method	Appearance(s)				Previous best performance (Note: Bold text indicates they hosted that edition.)	Rank
Team	Qualification method	Total (Note: In top division. Results in tiers below are excluded.)	First	Last	Streak	Previous best performance	Rank
United States	First in 2025	25	1990	2025	25	Champions (Eleven times) (Note: United States have won in 2005, 2008, 2009, 2011, 2013, 2015, 2016, 2017, 2019, 2023 and 2025.)	1
Canada	Second in 2025	25	1990	2025	25	Champions (Thirteen times) (Note: Canada have won in 1990, 1992, 1994, 1997, 1999, 2000, 2001, 2004, 2007, 2012, 2021, 2022 and 2024.)	2
Finland	Third in 2025	25	1990	2025	25	Runners-up (2019)	3
Czechia	Fourth in 2025	10	2012	2025	9	Third place (2022, 2023)	4
Switzerland	Fifth in 2025	21	1990	2025	16	Third place (2012)	5
Sweden	Sixth in 2025	24	1990	2025	5	Third place (2005, 2007)	6
Japan	Seventh in 2025	12	1990	2025	7	Fifth place (2022)	7
Germany	Eighth in 2025	19	1990	2025	8	Fourth place (2017)	8
Austria	Top two in Division I	1	Debut				13
Denmark	Top two in Division I	4	2021	2024	1	Tenth place (2021, 2022, 2024)	10

=== Groups composition ===
The serpentine system was used to organise the groups (rankings in brackets).

Group A

- United States (1)
- Czechia (4)
- Switzerland (5)
- Germany (8)
- Austria (9)

Group B

- Canada (2)
- Finland (3)
- Sweden (6)
- Japan (7)
- Denmark (10)

== Venue ==
Two venues were used for the tournament. When Denmark was awarded the hosting rights, it was announced that Herning and an unknown second city would host the tournament. That city would be Esbjerg, as they were announced as the secondary host on 22 December 2025, with the Granly Hockey Arena as the venue.

Herning had previously hosted the 2022 edition while also hosting the men's edition in 2018 and 2025.

=== Overview of venues ===
- The KVIK Hockey Arena in Herning was the main venue for the tournament, similar to 2022. The arena was built in 1987, but was renovated in 2018 as it was used as a training facility for the 2018 IIHF World Championship. The venue hosts Herning Blue Fox in the Danish league.
- The Granly Hockey Arena in Esbjerg was the secondary venue for the competition. The facility organised the 2011 World Women's Curling Championship and the 2015 European Curling Championships. The venue was built in 1974 and is home to Esbjerg Energy.

Tournament venues information
Venue	Rounds	Games
KVIK Hockey Arena	Group B, Relegation game, Quarterfinals, Semifinals and Final	17
Granly Hockey Arena	Group A, Quarterfinals	12

Venues in Denmark
Herning	2026 IIHF Women's World Championship is located in Denmark	Esbjerg
KVIK Hockey Arena	2026 IIHF Women's World Championship is located in Denmark	Granly Hockey Arena
Capacity: 4,120	2026 IIHF Women's World Championship is located in Denmark	Capacity: 4,200

== Format ==
The teams were split into two groups, using the serpentine system. The top four teams advanced to the knockout phase, while the bottom teams played the relegation playoff. During the knockout stage, there was a re-seeding after the quarterfinals.

== Match officials ==
Twelve referees and twelve linespersons were selected for the tournament.

Referees	Linespersons
(Canada) Jennifer Berezowski; (Canada) Amy Martin; (Canada) Shauna Neary; (Finland) Anniina Nurmi; (Germany) Tijana Haack; (Sweden) Veronica Lovensnö; (Sweden) Anna Hammar; (Switzerland) Anneke Orlandini; (United States) Michaela Bahl; (United States) Sydney Harris; (United States) Shannon Motzko; (United States) Laura Schmidlein	(Canada) Alannah Beres; (Canada) Stéphanie Gagnon; (Canada) Sophie Thomson; (Czech Republic) Kristýna Hájková; (France) Alexia Cheyroux; (Germany) Leonie Ernst; (Germany) Lara Fischer; (Poland) Natalia Suchanek; (United States) Kathryn Glover; (United States) Erika Greenen; (United States) Ashley Johnston

== Preliminary round ==
The groups were based on the final rankings from the previous tournament.

All times are local (UTC+1).

=== Group A ===
Pos	Team	Pld	W	OTW	OTL	L	GF	GA	GD	Pts	Qualification
1	United States	4	4	0	0	0	31	2	+29	12	Quarterfinals
2	Germany	4	2	1	0	1	7	7	0	8	Quarterfinals
3	Switzerland	4	1	1	0	2	7	13	−6	5 (Note: Czech Republic 1–2 Switzerland)	Quarterfinals
4	Czechia	4	1	0	2	1	7	13	−6	5	Quarterfinals
5	Austria	4	0	0	0	4	4	21	−17	0	Relegation playoff

Source: IIHF
Rules for classification: 1) points; 2) head-to-head points; 3) head-to-head goal difference; 4) head-to-head number of goals scored; 5) result against closest best-ranked team outside tied teams; 6) result against second-best ranked team outside tied teams; 7) seeding before tournament.
Notes:

6 November 2026; 15:00	Austria	1–4 (1–1, 0–1, 0–2)	Czech Republic	Granly Hockey Arena, Esbjerg; Attendance: 415

Game reference

Selma Luggin
Goalies
Klára Peslarová
Referees:
(United States) Michaela Bahl
(Germany) Tijana Haack
Linesmen:
(Canada) Stéphanie Gagnon
(United States) Ashley Johnston

Meixner (Schafzahl, Billa) – 07:03	1–0
	1–1	18:55 – Hymlárová (Tejralová)
	1–2	33:27 – Mlýnková (Čajanová, Mrázová)
	1–3	52:22 – Mrázová (Šapovalivová, Mlýnková)
	1–4	58:41 – Mrázová (EN)

10 min
Penalties
6 min
12
Shots
46

6 November 2026; 19:00	Switzerland	0–7 (0–1, 0–2, 0–4)	United States	Granly Hockey Arena, Esbjerg; Attendance: 727

Game reference

Andrea Brändli
Goalies
Aerin Frankel
Referees:
(Canada) Jennifer Berezowski
(Canada) Shauna Neary
Linesmen:
(Germany) Lara Fischer
(Canada) Sophie Thomson

0–1	09:01 – Bilka (Fox)
0–2	23:44 – O'Brien (Eden, Harvey)
0–3	32:56 – Edwards (Harvey, O'Brien) (PP)
0–4	41:11 – Bilka (Murphy, Fox)
0–5	46:40 – Simms (Harvey, Eden)
0–6	49:38 – Knight (Pannek)
0–7	59:06 – Edwards (Carpenter, Janecke)

2 min
Penalties
6 min
8
Shots
38

7 November 2026; 19:00	Germany	2–0 (0–0, 1–0, 1–0)	Austria	Granly Hockey Arena, Esbjerg; Attendance: 628

Game reference
Sandra Abstreiter	Goalies	Selma Luggin	Referees: (Sweden) Anna Hammar (United States) Sydney Harris; Linesmen: (France) Alexia Cheyroux (Canada) Stéphanie Gagnon
Jobst-Smith (Li. Welcke, Strobel) – 27:34 / 1–0; Jobst-Smith (Haider, Schiefer) (EN) – 58:28 / 2–0			Referees: (Sweden) Anna Hammar (United States) Sydney Harris; Linesmen: (France) Alexia Cheyroux (Canada) Stéphanie Gagnon
4 min	Penalties	4 min	Referees: (Sweden) Anna Hammar (United States) Sydney Harris; Linesmen: (France) Alexia Cheyroux (Canada) Stéphanie Gagnon
50	Shots	14	Referees: (Sweden) Anna Hammar (United States) Sydney Harris; Linesmen: (France) Alexia Cheyroux (Canada) Stéphanie Gagnon

8 November 2026; 15:00	United States	5–0 (2–0, 1–0, 2–0)	Germany	Granly Hockey Arena, Esbjerg; Attendance: 718

Game reference

Gwyneth Philips
Goalies
Sandra Abstreiter
Referees:
(Sweden) Anna Hammar
(Canada) Shauna Neary
Linesmen:
(France) Alexia Cheyroux
(Canada) Sophie Thomson

O'Brien (Harvey, Eden) – 13:58	1–0
Peschel (Simms, O'Brien) – 19:39	2–0
Carpenter (Knight, Pannek) – 25:45	3–0
Murphy (Bilka, Fox) – 49:28	4–0
Dunne (Harvey, Janecke) – 54:24	5–0

8 min
Penalties
10 min
38
Shots
13

8 November 2026; 19:00	Czech Republic	1–2 OT (0–1, 1–0, 0–0) (OT: 0–1)	Switzerland	Granly Hockey Arena, Esbjerg; Attendance: 312

Game reference

Klára Peslarová
Goalies
Saskia Maurer
Referees:
(United States) Michaela Bahl
(Canada) Jennifer Berezowski
Linesmen:
(Germany) Lara Fischer
(United States) Ashley Johnston

	0–1	14:29 – Wey (Müller)
Vocetková – 23:09	1–1
	1–2	61:49 – Müller (Baechler, Enzler)

33 min
Penalties
12 min
34
Shots
13

9 November 2026; 19:00	Austria	1–11 (0–4, 0–4, 1–3)	United States	Granly Hockey Arena, Esbjerg; Attendance: 571

Game reference

Magdalena Luggin
Goalies
Aerin Frankel
Gwyneth Philips
Referees:
(Canada) Jennifer Berezowski
(Germany) Tijana Haack
Linesmen:
(Canada) Stéphanie Gagnon
(Canada) Sophie Thomson

	0–1	09:08 – Harvey (Fox, Winn)
	0–2	12:59 – Knight (Barnes, Eden)
	0–3	16:46 – Harvey (O'Brien)
	0–4	17:08 – Janecke (Guilday, Dunne)
	0–5	20:09 – Janecke (Carpenter, Dunne)
	0–6	25:04 – Dunne (Fox, Bilka)
	0–7	35:49 – Eden (Harvey, Janecke)
	0–8	37:08 – Keller (Dunne, Pannek)
	0–9	48:46 – Knight (Edwards, Keller)
	0–10	51:17 – Guilday (Edwards, Murphy)
	0–11	53:40 – Harvey
Fazokas (Dauböck) – 54:35	1–11

4 min
Penalties
0 min
5
Shots
66

10 November 2026; 15:00	Czech Republic	1–2 GWS (1–1, 0–0, 0–0) (OT: 0–0) (SO: 0–1)	Germany	Granly Hockey Arena, Esbjerg; Attendance: 125

Game reference
Klára Peslarová	Goalies	Sandra Abstreiter	Referees: (Canada) Jennifer Berezowski (United States) Sydney Harris; Linesmen: (Germany) Lara Fischer (Canada) Sophie Thomson
/ 0–1 / 01:12 – Li. Welcke (Strobel, Lu. Welcke); Vocetková (Mrázová, Šapovalivová) – 10:22 / 1–1			Referees: (Canada) Jennifer Berezowski (United States) Sydney Harris; Linesmen: (Germany) Lara Fischer (Canada) Sophie Thomson
Mrázová (miss); Neubauerová (miss); Šapovalivová (miss); Vocetková (miss); Mlýnková (miss); Kaltounková; Mlýnková (miss)	Shootout	(miss) Hadraschek; (miss) Li. Welcke; (miss) Feldmeier; Lu. Welcke; (miss) Haider; (miss) Lu. Welcke; Li. Welcke	Referees: (Canada) Jennifer Berezowski (United States) Sydney Harris; Linesmen: (Germany) Lara Fischer (Canada) Sophie Thomson
6 min	Penalties	8 min	Referees: (Canada) Jennifer Berezowski (United States) Sydney Harris; Linesmen: (Germany) Lara Fischer (Canada) Sophie Thomson
30	Shots	24	Referees: (Canada) Jennifer Berezowski (United States) Sydney Harris; Linesmen: (Germany) Lara Fischer (Canada) Sophie Thomson

10 November 2026; 19:00	Switzerland	4–2 (1–0, 1–2, 2–0)	Austria	Granly Hockey Arena, Esbjerg; Attendance: 274

Game reference

Andrea Brändli
Goalies
Selma Luggin
Referees:
(United States) Michaela Bahl
(Germany) Tijana Haack
Linesmen:
(France) Alexia Cheyroux
(United States) Ashley Johnston

Leemann (Herzig, Baechler) – 12:23	1–0
	1–1	25:41 – Schafzahl (Meixner, Pfeffer)
	1–2	33:27 – Dauböck (Meixner, Schafzahl) (PP)
Müller (Wey, Zimmermann) – 33:46	2–2
Wey (Vallario, Leemann) (PP) – 44:57	3–2
Müller (Wetli) (EN) – 59:13	4–2

6 min
Penalties
16 min
40
Shots
23

11 November 2026; 15:00	Germany	3–1 (0–1, 2–0, 1–0)	Switzerland	Granly Hockey Arena, Esbjerg; Attendance: 326

Game reference

Sandra Abstreiter
Goalies
Saskia Maurer
Referees:
(United States) Michaela Bahl
(Sweden) Anna Hammar
Linesmen:
(France) Alexia Cheyroux
(United States) Ashley Johnston

	0–1	08:32 – Baechler (Enzler, Herzig)
Kluge (Hadraschek, Weichenhain) – 33:38	1–1
Jobst-Smith (Li. Welcke, Voigt) – 34:33	2–1
Nix (Kluge, Hadraschek) – 42:07	3–1

6 min
Penalties
10 min
31
Shots
21

11 November 2026; 19:00	United States	8–1 (2–0, 4–0, 2–1)	Czech Republic	Granly Hockey Arena, Esbjerg; Attendance: 861

Game reference

Aerin Frankel
Goalies
Aneta Šenková
Daniela Nováková
Referees:
(United States) Sydney Harris
(Canada) Shauna Neary
Linesmen:
(Germany) Lara Fischer
(Canada) Stéphanie Gagnon

Murphy (Fox) – 00:53	1–0
Knight (Janecke, Winn) – 15:57	2–0
Knight (Eden, Barnes) – 22:53	3–0
Murphy (Fox, Peschel) – 29:19	4–0
Zumwinkle (O'Brien) – 35:49	5–0
Edwards (Fox, Carpenter) (PP2) – 37:07	6–0
Knight (O'Brien) (SH) – 44:41	7–0
Carpenter (Janecke, Edwards) – 53:24	8–0
	8–1	56:38 – Mlýnková (Gildainová, Čabelová)

8 min
Penalties
14 min
54
Shots
12

=== Group B ===
Pos	Team	Pld	W	OTW	OTL	L	GF	GA	GD	Pts	Qualification or relegation
1	Canada	4	4	0	0	0	26	1	+25	12	Quarterfinals
2	Sweden	4	3	0	0	1	20	6	+14	9	Quarterfinals
3	Finland	4	2	0	0	2	13	9	+4	6	Quarterfinals
4	Denmark (H)	4	0	1	0	3	4	26	−22	2	Quarterfinals
5	Japan	4	0	0	1	3	4	25	−21	1	Relegation playoff

Source: IIHF
Rules for classification: 1) points; 2) head-to-head points; 3) head-to-head goal difference; 4) head-to-head number of goals scored; 5) result against closest best-ranked team outside tied teams; 6) result against second-best ranked team outside tied teams; 7) seeding before tournament.
(H) Host

6 November 2026; 15:00	Sweden	1–5 (0–3, 0–1, 1–1)	Canada	KVIK Hockey Arena, Herning; Attendance: 578

Game reference

Ebba Svensson Träff
Goalies
Ann-Renée Desbiens
Referees:
(Finland) Anniina Nurmi
(Switzerland) Anneke Orlandini
Linesmen:
(United States) Erika Greenen
(Poland) Natalia Suchanek

	0–1	06:59 – Eldridge (Tremblay, Cooper)
	0–2	10:13 – Clark (Watts, Ambrose) (PP)
	0–3	18:43 – Leslie
	0–4	29:38 – Cooper (Eldridge) (PP)
Thuvik (Jungåker, Raunio) (PP) – 42:37	1–4
	1–5	53:44 – Eldridge (Kraemer, Primerano) (PP)

41 min
Penalties
6 min
14
Shots
41

6 November 2026; 19:00	Denmark	1–4 (0–1, 0–2, 1–1)	Finland	KVIK Hockey Arena, Herning; Attendance: 1,425

Game reference

Emma-Sofie Nordstrøm
Goalies
Sanni Ahola
Referees:
(Sweden) Veronica Lovensnö
(Canada) Amy Martin
Linesmen:
(United States) Kathryn Glover
(Czech Republic) Kristýna Hájková

	0–1	03:56 – Holopainen (Schalin)
	0–2	24:38 – E. Nuutinen (Tapani, Karvinen)
	0–3	26:38 – S. Nuutinen (SH)
Bergmann – 42:32	1–3
	1–4	47:27 – Nieminen (Koukkula)

6 min
Penalties
4 min
6
Shots
59

7 November 2026; 19:00	Japan	2–3 GWS (2–0, 0–1, 0–1) (OT: 0–0) (SO: 0–1)	Denmark	KVIK Hockey Arena, Herning; Attendance: 1,296

Game reference

Miyuu Masuhara
Goalies
Emma-Sofie Nordstrøm
Referees:
(United States) Shannon Motzko
(United States) Laura Schmidlein
Linesmen:
(Canada) Alannah Beres
(Germany) Leonie Ernst

Odaira (Koyama) – 05:22	1–0
Odaira (Nagaoka) – 13:53	2–0
	2–1	20:47 – Bergmann (Jensen)
	2–2	57:04 – Christensen (Bergmann, Asperup)

Ito (miss)
Odaira
Shiga (miss)
Wajima (miss)
Nagaoka (miss)
Shootout
Jensen
(miss) Bergmann
(miss) Christensen
(miss) Glud
Foss
10 min
Penalties
12 min
32
Shots
15

8 November 2026; 15:00	Finland	1–4 (0–2, 0–0, 1–2)	Sweden	KVIK Hockey Arena, Herning; Attendance: 615

Game reference

Sanni Ahola
Goalies
Ebba Svensson Träff
Referees:
(Canada) Amy Martin
(United States) Shannon Motzko
Linesmen:
(Canada) Alannah Beres
(Czech Republic) Kristýna Hájková

	0–1	04:14 – Karlsson (Svensson)
	0–2	08:21 – Svensson (Jungåker, Raunio) (PP)
	0–3	46:14 – Hjalmarsson (Jungåker, Löwenhielm)
Nieminen (Yrjölä, Vanhanen) – 48:41	1–3
	1–4	58:38 – Grillfors (EN)

8 min
Penalties
4 min
29
Shots
32

8 November 2026; 19:00	Canada	9–0 (2–0, 2–0, 5–0)	Japan	KVIK Hockey Arena, Herning; Attendance: 205

Game reference

Ève Gascon
Goalies
Riko Kawaguchi
Referees:
(Sweden) Veronica Lovensnö
(Switzerland) Anneke Orlandini
Linesmen:
(United States) Kathryn Glover
(Poland) Natalia Suchanek

Primerano (EA) – 06:29	1–0
Ambrose (Serdachny, Leslie) – 14:32	2–0
Watts (Eldridge, Gosling) (PP2) – 21:14	3–0
Tremblay (Watts) – 33:57	4–0
Cooper (Manness, O'Neill) – 46:51	5–0
Maltais – 52:52	6–0
Jaques (O'Neill) (PP) – 58:10	7–0
Wozniewicz (Cooper) – 58:47	8–0
Kraemer (Ambrose, Stacey) – 59:42	9–0

6 min
Penalties
8 min
59
Shots
14

9 November 2026; 19:00	Denmark	0–10 (0–3, 0–4, 0–3)	Canada	KVIK Hockey Arena, Herning; Attendance: 1,807

Game reference

Caroline Bjergstad
Aya Petersen
Goalies
Kayle Osborne
Referees:
(Finland) Anniina Nurmi
(United States) Laura Schmidlein
Linesmen:
(Germany) Leonie Ernst
(United States) Erika Greenen

0–1	15:38 – Fast (McDonald, Clark)
0–2	15:54 – Tremblay (Eldridge, Shelton)
0–3	18:48 – Maltais (Leslie, Gosling)
0–4	23:34 – O'Neill (Ambrose)
0–5	27:31 – Fillier (Primerano) (PP)
0–6	28:03 – Maltais (Jaques, Stacey)
0–7	33:34 – Cooper (Stacey, Kraemer)
0–8	43:14 – Eldridge (Fillier, Primerano)
0–9	44:48 – Manness (Jaques)
0–10	47:21 – Stacey (Kraemer, Shelton)

2 min
Penalties
6 min
6
Shots
74

10 November 2026; 15:00	Finland	8–2 (3–1, 2–1, 3–0)	Japan	KVIK Hockey Arena, Herning; Attendance: 72

Game reference

Emilia Kyrkkö
Goalies
Riko Kawaguchi
Miyuu Masuhara
Referees:
(Canada) Amy Martin
(Switzerland) Anneke Orlandini
Linesmen:
(Canada) Alannah Beres
(Germany) Leonie Ernst

	0–1	04:11 – Koyama
E. Nuutinen (Tulus, Nieminen) (EA) – 06:56	1–1
Liikala (S. Nuutinen, Parkkonen) – 07:38	2–1
Vanhanen (Juusela, Vainikka) – 09:46	3–1
	3–2	21:38 – Rio Noro (Ito, Nagaoka) (PP2)
Juusela (Vainikka) – 23:24	4–2
Schalin (Koukkula, Yrjölä) (SH) – 25:59	5–2
Rantala (Juusela, Vanhanen) – 49:51	6–2
E. Nuutinen (Tulus, Vanhanen) (PP) – 56:23	7–2
Yrjölä (Tapani) – 56:42	8–2

8 min
Penalties
8 min
40
Shots
17

10 November 2026; 19:00	Sweden	10–0 (2–0, 5–0, 3–0)	Denmark	KVIK Hockey Arena, Herning; Attendance: 1,257

Game reference

Emma Söderberg
Goalies
Emma-Sofie Nordstrøm
Referees:
(United States) Shannon Motzko
(United States) Laura Schmidlein
Linesmen:
(United States) Erika Greenen
(Czech Republic) Kristýna Hájková

Ljungblom (Jungåker) – 07:16	1–0
Löwenhielm (Karlsson, Holmgren) – 17:57	2–0
Karlsson (Holmgren) – 21:42	3–0
Hedqvist (Löwenhielm, Jungåker) – 22:11	4–0
Hjalmarsson (Jungåker, Svensson) (PP) – 24:22	5–0
Hall (Jungåker) – 30:47	6–0
Hedqvist (Löwenhielm, Bouveng) – 37:18	7 –0
Grillfors (Blom, Ljungblom) – 43:55	8–0
T. Johansson (Löwenhielm, Blom) – 47:33	9–0
Hall (Lundin, Hjalmarsson) – 53:04	10–0

2 min
Penalties
6 min
63
Shots
4

11 November 2026; 15:00	Canada	2–0 (1–0, 0–0, 1–0)	Finland	KVIK Hockey Arena, Herning; Attendance: 340

Game reference
Ann-Renée Desbiens	Goalies	Sanni Ahola	Referees: (Sweden) Veronica Lovensnö (Switzerland) Anneke Orlandini; Linesmen: (Germany) Leonie Ernst (United States) Kathryn Glover
Kraemer (Watts, Tabin) – 03:22 / 1–0; Fillier (Eldridge) – 46:44 / 2–0			Referees: (Sweden) Veronica Lovensnö (Switzerland) Anneke Orlandini; Linesmen: (Germany) Leonie Ernst (United States) Kathryn Glover
8 min	Penalties	2 min	Referees: (Sweden) Veronica Lovensnö (Switzerland) Anneke Orlandini; Linesmen: (Germany) Leonie Ernst (United States) Kathryn Glover
38	Shots	25	Referees: (Sweden) Veronica Lovensnö (Switzerland) Anneke Orlandini; Linesmen: (Germany) Leonie Ernst (United States) Kathryn Glover

11 November 2026; 19:00	Japan	0–5 (0–3, 0–1, 0–1)	Sweden	KVIK Hockey Arena, Herning; Attendance: 231

Game reference

Miyuu Masuhara
Goalies
Ebba Svensson Träff
Referees:
(United States) Shannon Motzko
(Finland) Anniina Nurmi
Linesmen:
(Canada) Alannah Beres
(Poland) Natalia Suchanek

0–1	00:54 – T. Johansson (Löwenhielm, Hallin)
0–2	12:15 – Jungåker (Persson, Bouveng)
0–3	15:12 – Hedqvist (Bouveng, L. Johansson)
0–4	26:11 – Sundin (Grillfors, Ljungblom)
0–5	45:17 – Sundin

4 min
Penalties
2 min
14
Shots
41

== Relegation playoff ==
13 November 2026; 11:00	Japan	1–2 OT (0–0, 0–1, 1–0) (OT: 0–1)	Austria	KVIK Hockey Arena, Herning; Attendance: 1,118

Game reference

Riko Kawaguchi
Goalies
Selma Luggin
Referees:
(United States) Michaela Bahl
(United States) Laura Schmidlein
Linesmen:
(France) Alexia Cheyroux
(United States) Kathryn Glover

	0–1	20:36 – Meixner (Fazokas, Lintner) (PP)
Ak. Shiga (Seki, Ao. Shiga) – 50:22	1–1
	1–2	61:10 – Meixner (Fazokas, Schafzahl) (PP)

8 min
Penalties
6 min
31
Shots
20

== Knockout stage ==
There will be a re-seeding after the quarterfinals.

=== Qualified teams' seedings ===
Quarter-finalists are paired according to their positions in the groups: the first-place team in each preliminary-round group plays the fourth-place team of the other group, while the second-place team plays the third-place team of the other group.

Semi-finalists are paired according to their seeding after the preliminary round, which is determined by the following criteria. The best-ranked semi-finalist plays against the lowest-ranked semi-finalist, while the second-best ranked semi-finalist plays the third-best ranked semi-finalist.

Rank	Team	Grp	Pos	Pts	GD	GF	Seed
1	United States	A	1	12	+29	31	1
2	Canada	B	1	12	+25	26	2
3	Sweden	B	2	9	+14	20	6
4	Germany	A	2	8	0	7	7
5	Finland	B	3	6	+4	13	5
6	Switzerland	A	3	5	−6	7	4
7	Czechia	A	4	5	−6	7	3
8	Denmark	B	4	2	−22	4	10

Classification rules: 1) position in the group; 2) number of points; 3) goal difference; 4) number of goals scored for; 5) seeding number entering the tournament.

=== Bracket ===
Quarterfinals
13 November
A1 United States	14
B4 Denmark	0
13 November
B2 Sweden	1
A3 Switzerland	0
13 November
B1 Canada	3
A4 Czechia	2
13 November
A2 Germany	0
B3 Finland	6

Semifinals
15 November
1 United States	5
5 Finland	0
15 November
2 Canada	3
3 Sweden	0

Final
16 November
1 United States	6
2 Canada	2
Third place match
16 November
3 Sweden (GWS)	2
5 Finland	1

=== Quarterfinals ===
13 November 2026; 15:00	Canada	3–2 (0–0, 3–1, 0–1)	Czechia	KVIK Hockey Arena, Herning; Attendance: 434

Game reference

Ève Gascon
Goalies
Klára Peslarová
Referees:
(Sweden) Veronica Lovensnö
(Switzerland) Anneke Orlandini
Linesmen:
(Germany) Leonie Ernst
(United States) Erika Greenen

Fillier (Tremblay, Eldridge) – 21:29	1–0
Leslie (Primerano) (PP) – 24:12	2–0
	2–1	31:01 – Kaltounková (Neubauerová, Hymlárová) (PP)
Fast (Serdachny, Gosling) – 36:47	3–1
	3–2	45:57 – Kaltounková (Neubauerová) (PP)

10 min
Penalties
12 min
41
Shots
16

13 November 2026; 15:00	Germany	0–6 (0–2, 0–1, 0–3)	Finland	Granly Hockey Arena, Esbjerg; Attendance: 601

Game reference

Sandra Abstreiter
Goalies
Sanni Ahola
Referees:
(Canada) Jennifer Berezowski
(Sweden) Anna Hammar
Linesmen:
(United States) Ashley Johnston
(Canada) Sophie Thomson

0–1	13:17 – Karvinen (Rantala, Nieminen)
0–2	16:40 – Schalin (S. Nuutinen, Parkkonen)
0–3	30:32 – Vainikka (Laitinen, Tulus) (PP)
0–4	50:30 – Nieminen (Vanhanen, Juusela)
0–5	50:51 – Parkkonen (Nieminen, Tapani)
0–6	59:26 – Holopainen (Juusela, Koukkula)

6 min
Penalties
2 min
11
Shots
32

13 November 2026; 19:00	United States	14–0 (5–0, 5–0, 4–0)	Denmark	KVIK Hockey Arena, Herning; Attendance: 1,065

Game reference

Gwyneth Philips
Goalies
Emma-Sofie Nordstrøm
Referees:
(Germany) Tijana Haack
(United States) Shannon Motzko
Linesmen:
(Czech Republic) Kristýna Hájková
(Poland) Natalia Suchanek

Fox (Bilka, Harvey) – 00:57	1–0
O'Brien (Dunne, Winn) – 02:20	2–0
Pannek (Winn, Zumwinkle) – 02:50	3–0
Fillier (Tremblay, Eldridge) – 04:35	4–0
Carpenter (Knight) – 04:35	5–0
Winn (Harvey) – 07:54	6–0
Harvey (Fox, Bilka) (PP) – 21:31	7–0
Bilka (Fox, Stecklein) – 28:54	8–0
Zumwinkle (O'Brien, Edwards) – 29:55	9–0
Pannek (Harvey, Winn) – 31:32	10–0
Edwards (Keller, Scamurra) – 39:48	11–0
Harvey (Fox) – 45:51	12–0
Winn (Dunne) – 48:18	13–0
Compher (Dunne) – 52:15	14–0

4 min
Penalties
4 min
85
Shots
8

13 November 2026; 19:00	Sweden	1–0 (0–0, 1–0, 0–0)	Switzerland	Granly Hockey Arena, Esbjerg; Attendance: 873

Game reference
Ebba Svensson Träff	Goalies	Saskia Maurer	Referees: (United States) Sydney Harris (Canada) Shauna Neary; Linesmen: (Germany) Lara Fischer (Canada) Stéphanie Gagnon
Hjalmarsson (Jungåker, Lundin) – 34:40 / Goals			Referees: (United States) Sydney Harris (Canada) Shauna Neary; Linesmen: (Germany) Lara Fischer (Canada) Stéphanie Gagnon
4 min	Penalties	4 min	Referees: (United States) Sydney Harris (Canada) Shauna Neary; Linesmen: (Germany) Lara Fischer (Canada) Stéphanie Gagnon
25	Shots	9	Referees: (United States) Sydney Harris (Canada) Shauna Neary; Linesmen: (Germany) Lara Fischer (Canada) Stéphanie Gagnon

=== Semifinals ===
15 November 2026; 15:00	United States	5–0 (2–0, 3–0, 0–0)	Finland	KVIK Hockey Arena, Herning; Attendance: 694

Game reference

Aerin Frankel
Goalies
Sanni Ahola
Referees:
(Canada) Jennifer Berezowski
(Canada) Amy Martin
Linesmen:
(Canada) Alannah Beres
(Canada) Sophie Thomson

Pannek (Scamurra, Edwards) – 06:36	1–0
Carpenter (Knight, Janecke) – 16:34	2–0
Harvey (Winn, Fox) – 33:33	3–0
Eden (Dunne, O'Brien) – 34:07	4–0
Knight (Keller, Janecke) – 35:08	5–0

4 min
Penalties
2 min
34
Shots
17

15 November 2026; 19:00	Canada	3–0 (0–0, 2–0, 1–0)	Sweden	KVIK Hockey Arena, Herning; Attendance: 661

Game reference

Ann-Renée Desbiens
Goalies
Ebba Svensson Träff
Referees:
(Finland) Anniina Nurmi
(Switzerland) Anneke Orlandini
Linesmen:
(Czech Republic) Kristýna Hájková
(United States) Ashley Johnston

Fillier (Eldridge, Primerano) (PP) – 27:15	1–0
Wozniewicz (Gosling, O'Neill) – 32:57	2–0
Maltais (Shelton) – 48:08	3–0

6 min
Penalties
8 min
30
Shots
13

=== Third place game ===
16 November 2026; 15:00	Sweden	2–1 GWS (0–0, 0–1, 1–0) (OT: 0–0) (SO: 1–0)	Finland	KVIK Hockey Arena, Herning; Attendance: 516

Game reference
Ebba Svensson Träff	Goalies	Sanni Ahola	Referees: (Canada) Shauna Neary (Switzerland) Anneke Orlandini; Linesmen: (Canada) Alannah Beres (Canada) Sophie Thomson
/ 0–1 / 36:55 – Karvinen (Holopainen, Nieminen) (PP); Ljungblom (Thuvik, Svensson) (PP) – 54:00 / 1–1			Referees: (Canada) Shauna Neary (Switzerland) Anneke Orlandini; Linesmen: (Canada) Alannah Beres (Canada) Sophie Thomson
Grillfors; Jungåker (miss); Svensson; Persson (miss)	Shootout	Tulus; (miss) E. Nuutinen; (miss) Karvinen; (miss) Nieminen; (miss) Juusela	Referees: (Canada) Shauna Neary (Switzerland) Anneke Orlandini; Linesmen: (Canada) Alannah Beres (Canada) Sophie Thomson
4 min	Penalties	12 min	Referees: (Canada) Shauna Neary (Switzerland) Anneke Orlandini; Linesmen: (Canada) Alannah Beres (Canada) Sophie Thomson
37	Shots	30	Referees: (Canada) Shauna Neary (Switzerland) Anneke Orlandini; Linesmen: (Canada) Alannah Beres (Canada) Sophie Thomson

=== Final ===
16 November 2026; 19:00	United States	6–2 (1–1, 2–0, 3–1)	Canada	KVIK Hockey Arena, Herning; Attendance: 2,042

Game reference

Aerin Frankel
Goalies
Ann-Renée Desbiens
Referees:
(Canada) Amy Martin
(Finland) Anniina Nurmi
Linesmen:
(Germany) Lara Fischer
(Czech Republic) Kristýna Hájková

	0–1	Fillier (Eldridge, Tremblay) – 11:03
Knight (Janecke, Edwards) – 16:17	1–1
Pannek (Scamurra, Zumwinkle) – 31:33	2–1
Knight (Keller, Fox) – 37:51	3–1
Pannek (Barnes, Stecklein) – 41:29	4–1
Eden (Dunne, Harvey) – 42:48	5–1
	5–2	Fillier (O'Neill, Fast) – 43:28
Scamurra (Knight) – 56:33	6–2

12 min
Penalties
8 min
27
Shots
20

== Final standings ==
Pos	Grp	Team	Pld	W	OTW	OTL	L	GF	GA	GD	Pts	Final Result
1	A	United States	7	7	0	0	0	56	4	+52	21	Champions
2	B	Canada	7	6	0	0	1	34	9	+25	18	Runners-up
3	B	Sweden	7	5	0	0	2	23	11	+12	15	Third place
4	B	Finland	7	3	0	0	4	20	15	+5	9	Fourth place
5	A	Germany	5	2	1	0	2	7	13	−6	8	Eliminated in quarterfinals
6	A	Switzerland	5	1	1	0	3	7	14	−7	5	Eliminated in quarterfinals
7	A	Czechia	5	1	0	2	2	9	16	−7	5	Eliminated in quarterfinals
8	B	Denmark	5	0	1	0	4	4	40	−36	2	Eliminated in quarterfinals
9	A	Austria	5	0	1	0	4	6	22	−16	2	Avoided relegation
10	B	Japan	5	0	0	2	3	5	27	−22	2	Relegated to the 2027 Division I A

Source: IIHF

== Awards and statistics ==
The awards were announced on 16 November 2026.

=== Awards ===
Directorate Awards

Position	Player
Goaltender	(United States) Aerin Frankel
Defenceman	(United States) Caroline Harvey
Forward	(United States) Hilary Knight
MVP	(United States) Caroline Harvey

All-Star team

Position	Player
Goaltender	(Austria) Selma Luggin
Defenceman	(United States) Caroline Harvey
Defenceman	(Sweden) Mira Jungåker
Forward	(Canada) Jessie Eldridge
Forward	(Canada) Sarah Fillier
Forward	(United States) Hilary Knight

== Statistics ==
=== Scoring leaders ===
List shows the top ten skaters sorted by points, then goals.

Player	GP	G	A	Pts	+/−	PIM	POS
(United States) Caroline Harvey	7	6	10	16	+20	8	D
(United States) Taylor Fox	7	1	13	14	+9	0	F
(United States) Hilary Knight	7	9	4	13	+12	0	F
(United States) Kelly Pannek	7	5	5	10	+15	2	F
(United States) Laila Edwards	7	4	6	10	+20	2	D
(United States) Casey O'Brien	7	3	7	10	+12	0	F
(Canada) Jessie Eldridge	7	3	7	10	+6	2	F
(United States) Joy Dunne	7	2	8	10	+12	4	F
(United States) Tessa Janecke	7	2	8	10	+10	0	F
(Sweden) Mira Jungåker	7	1	8	9	+6	2	D

GP = Games played; G = Goals; A = Assists; Pts = Points; +/− = Plus/Minus; PIM = Penalties in Minutes; POS = Position
Source: IIHF

=== Goaltending leaders ===
Only the top five goaltenders, based on save percentage, who have played at least 40% of their team's minutes, are included in this list.

Player	GP	TOI	GA	GAA	SA	SV%	SO
(Austria) Selma Luggin	4	237:04	8	2.02	156	95.12	0
(United States) Aerin Frankel	5	270:45	3	0.66	56	94.92	2
(Switzerland) Saskia Maurer	3	179:31	5	1.67	85	94.44	0
(Sweden) Ebba Svensson Träff	6	367:57	10	1.63	143	93.46	2
(Canada) Ann-Renée Desbiens	4	238:35	6	1.51	72	92.31	2

GP = games played; TOI = time on ice (minutes:seconds); GA = goals against; GAA = goals against average; SA = shots against; SV% = save percentage; SO = shutouts
Source: IIHF
