= Eisenschmid =

Eisenschmid is a German surname. Notable people with the surname include:

- Markus Eisenschmid (born 1995), German ice hockey player
- Nicola Eisenschmid (born 1996), German ice hockey player
- Tanja Eisenschmid (born 1993), German ice hockey player
