= 2022 IIHF Women's World Championship =

2022 edition of the IIHF Women's World Championship

Tournament details
- Host country: Denmark
- Cities: Herning, Frederikshavn
- Venues: 2 (in 2 host cities)
- Dates: 25 August – 4 September
- Opened by: Margrethe II
- Teams: 10

Final positions
- Champions: Canada (12th title)
- Runners-up: United States
- Third place: Czechia
- Fourth place: Switzerland

Tournament statistics
- Games played: 31
- Goals scored: 192 (6.19 per game)
- Attendance: 21,580 (696 per game)
- Scoring leader: (United States) Taylor Heise (18 points)

Awards
- MVP: (United States) Taylor Heise

Official website
- www.iihf.com

The 2022 IIHF Women's World Championship was the 21st edition of the Top Division of the Women's Ice Hockey World Championship organized by the International Ice Hockey Federation. The tournament was contested in Herning and Frederikshavn, Denmark, from 25 August to 4 September 2022, at the KVIK Hockey Arena, and Scanel Hockey Arena. Historically, a top division tournament was not played during Olympic years, but in 2021, the IIHF decided that the tournament will be played each year, even during Olympic years.

Canada defeated the United States 2–1 in the final to win their record-extending 12th title.

== Venues ==
Herning	Frederikshavn
KVIK Hockey Arena; Capacity: 4,120 (seats: 420)	Scanel Hockey Arena; Capacity:4,000 (seats: 750)

== Participating teams ==
Group A

- Canada
- United States
- Finland
- Switzerland
- ~~ROC~~^{1} (expelled)
- Japan

Group B

- Czechia
- Germany
- Hungary
- Denmark
- Sweden^{1}

^{1}Russia was expelled on 1 March 2022, and Sweden was invited to replace them.

== Rosters ==
Each team's roster consisted of at least 15 skaters (forwards and defencemen) and two goaltenders, and at most 20 skaters and three goaltenders. All ten participating nations, through the confirmation of their respective national associations, had to submit a "Long List" roster no later than two weeks before the tournament.

== Match officials ==
Eleven referees and ten linesmen were selected for the tournament.

Referees	Linesmen
(Austria) Julia Kainberger; (Canada) Cianna Lieffers; (Canada) Shauna Neary; (Finland) Kaisa Ketonen; (Finland) Anniina Nurmi; (Germany) Tijana Haack; (Latvia) Agnese Kārkliņa; (Slovakia) Nikoleta Celárová; (United States) Kaylen Hanson; (United States) Samantha Hiller; (United States) Amanda Tassoni	(Belgium) Marine Dinant; (Canada) Jessica Chartrand; (Canada) Marie-Pierre Jalbert; (Canada) Justine Todd; (China) Wang Hui; (Finland) Tiina Saarimäki; (Finland) Linnea Sainio; (Slovakia) Magda Jonáková; (Sweden) Anna Hammar; (United States) Jennifer Cameron

== Preliminary round ==
All times are local (Central European Summer Time – UTC+2).

=== Group A ===
Pos	Team	Pld	W	OTW	OTL	L	GF	GA	GD	Pts	Qualification
1	United States	4	4	0	0	0	30	3	+27	12	Quarterfinals
2	Canada	4	3	0	0	1	19	7	+12	9	Quarterfinals
3	Finland	4	2	0	0	2	15	13	+2	6	Quarterfinals
4	Switzerland	4	1	0	0	3	4	18	−14	3	Quarterfinals
5	Japan	4	0	0	0	4	4	31	−27	0	Quarterfinals

Source: IIHF
Rules for classification: 1) points; 2) head-to-head points; 3) head-to-head goal difference; 4) head-to-head number of goals scored; 5) result against closest best-ranked team outside tied teams; 6) result against second-best ranked team outside tied teams; 7) seeding before tournament.

25 August 2022; 15:00	Japan	0–10 (0–4, 0–5, 0–1)	United States	KVIK Hockey Arena, Herning; Attendance: 438

Game reference

Akane Konishi
Miyuu Masuhara
Goalies
Nicole Hensley
Referees:
(Latvia) Agnese Kārkliņa
(Canada) Cianna Lieffers
Linesmen:
(Finland) Linnea Sainio
(China) Wang Hui

0–1	06:27 – Pannek (Coyne Schofield, Eden)
0–2	08:12 – Guilday (Harmon, Kessel)
0–3	19:00 – Harvey (Heise) (EA)
0–4	19:49 – Scamurra (Keller, Heise)
0–5	21:15 – Eden (Harmon, Coyne Schofield)
0–6	21:56 – Bilka (Heise, Carpenter) (PP)
0–7	28:36 – Roque (Barnes, Coyne Schofield) (PP)
0–8	38:08 – Carpenter (Heise, Kessel)
0–9	38:37 – Kessel (Heise)
0–10	43:57 – Carpenter (Stecklein)

12 min
Penalties
4 min
6
Shots
62

25 August 2022; 19:00	Finland	1–4 (1–2, 0–1, 0–1)	Canada	KVIK Hockey Arena, Herning; Attendance: 501

Game reference

Anni Keisala
Goalies
Ann-Renée Desbiens
Referees:
(Slovakia) Nikoleta Celárová
(United States) Amanda Tassoni
Linesmen:
(United States) Jennifer Cameron
(Sweden) Anna Hammar

	0–1	07:38 – Nurse (Poulin, Larocque) (PP)
Liikala (Tapani, Hiirikoski) – 12:07	1–1
	1–2	14:51 – Poulin (Nurse, Larocque)
	1–3	33:01 – Mikkelson (Shelton, Fillier)
	1–4	58:28 – Turnbull (Clark) (EN)

27 min
Penalties
12 min
17
Shots
43

26 August 2022; 18:30	Switzerland	3–1 (0–0, 2–0, 1–1)	Japan	KVIK Hockey Arena, Herning; Attendance: 389

Game reference

Andrea Brändli
Goalies
Miyuu Masuhara
Referees:
(Finland) Anniina Nurmi
(United States) Amanda Tassoni
Linesmen:
(Canada) Jessica Chartrand
(Sweden) Anna Hammar

Stalder (Müller) – 27:23	1–0
Müller (Stalder, Leemann) – 38:55	2–0
Lutz (Zimmermann) (EN) – 57:55	3–0
	3–1	59:37 – Ak. Shiga (Ao. Shiga, Hitosato) (EA)

0 min
Penalties
8 min
20
Shots
17

27 August 2022; 15:00	United States	6–1 (1–0, 2–0, 3–1)	Finland	KVIK Hockey Arena, Herning; Attendance: 526

Game reference

Maddie Rooney
Goalies
Anni Keisala
Referees:
(Slovakia) Nikoleta Celárová
(Austria) Julia Kainberger
Linesmen:
(Slovakia) Magda Jonáková
(Canada) Justine Todd

Dunne (Brandt, Kessel) – 06:13	1–0
Roque (Barnes, Coyne Schofield) (PP) – 28:53	2–0
Kessel (Roque, Coyne Schofield) (PP) – 37:11	3–0
	3–1	40:46 – Viitasuo (Liikala)
Kessel (Heise, Carpenter) – 42:39	4–1
Bilka (EN) – 57:43	5–1
Brandt (Knight, Bilka) – 58:24	6–1

6 min
Penalties
10 min
72
Shots
16

27 August 2022; 19:00	Canada	4–1 (1–0, 2–0, 1–1)	Switzerland	KVIK Hockey Arena, Herning; Attendance: 530

Game reference

Ann-Renée Desbiens
Goalies
Andrea Brändli
Referees:
(United States) Samantha Hiller
(Finland) Anniina Nurmi
Linesmen:
(Finland) Tiina Saarimäki
(China) Wang Hui

Fillier (Shelton) – 10:15	1–0
Fillier – 29:40	2–0
Clark (Turnbull, Bach) – 31:12	3–0
	3–1	52:32 – Marti (Zimmermann, Lutz)
Turnbull (Fast) – 58:46	4–1

12 min
Penalties
4 min
46
Shots
8

28 August 2022; 15:00	Japan	0–9 (0–3, 0–4, 0–2)	Canada	KVIK Hockey Arena, Herning; Attendance: 302

Game reference

Akane Konishi
Riko Kawaguchi
Goalies
Emerance Maschmeyer
Referees:
(Germany) Tijana Haack
(Austria) Julia Kainberger
Linesmen:
(Canada) Marie-Pierre Jalbert
(Slovakia) Magda Jonáková

0–1	01:25 – Bach (Zandee-Hart, Shelton) (PP)
0–2	06:54 – Poulin (Ambrose, Fillier) (PP)
0–3	15:05 – Maltais (Mikkelson, Stacey)
0–4	22:26 – Turnbull (Bach, Larocque)
0–5	33:09 – Poulin (Jenner)
0–6	37:19 – Shelton (O'Neill, Bach)
0–7	38:02 – Rattray (Turnbull, Larocque)
0–8	44:32 – Potomak (Eldridge, Fillier)
0–9	50:36 – Fillier (Poulin, Ambrose) (PP)

16 min
Penalties
0 min
5
Shots
69

29 August 2022; 15:00	Finland	9–3 (2–1, 4–1, 3–1)	Japan	KVIK Hockey Arena, Herning; Attendance: 531

Game reference

Meeri Räisänen
Goalies
Miyuu Masuhara
Referees:
(United States) Kaylen Hanson
(Canada) Shauna Neary
Linesmen:
(Finland) Tiina Saarimäki
(Canada) Justine Todd

Sundelin (Yrjänen) – 10:13	1–0
	1–1	13:25 – Ak. Shiga (Ito, Toko)
Tapani (Karvinen) – 14:44	2–1
Vainikka (Rantala, Tulus) – 21:33	3–1
Holopainen (Parkkonen) – 27:31	4–1
	4–2	31:01 – Ak. Shiga (Seki)
Vainikka (Rantala, Holopainen) – 34:13	5–2
Nieminen (Laitinen, Rantala) – 39:14	6–2
Laitinen (Sundelin) – 43:20	7–2
Holopainen (Tulus, Vainikka) – 44:59	8–2
Karjalainen (Yrjänen, Vanhanen) – 56:28	9–2
	9–3	58:14 – Ao. Shiga (Toko, Ak. Shiga)

2 min
Penalties
4 min
51
Shots
20

29 August 2022; 19:00	United States	9–0 (4–0, 1–0, 4–0)	Switzerland	KVIK Hockey Arena, Herning; Attendance: 791

Game reference

Maddie Rooney
Goalies
Saskia Maurer
Referees:
(United States) Samantha Hiller
(Finland) Kaisa Ketonen
Linesmen:
(Canada) Marie-Pierre Jalbert
(Slovakia) Magda Jonáková

Roque (Stecklein, Zumwinkle) – 05:48	1–0
Bilka (Harvey, Stecklein) – 12:33	2–0
Heise (Carpenter) – 14:46	3–0
Heise (Carpenter, Harmon) – 18:00	4–0
Knight (Carpenter, Bilka) (PP) – 35:43	5–0
Harmon (Keller, Coyne Schofield) – 44:28	6–0
Knight (Pannek, Bilka) – 46:15	7–0
Barnes (Coyne Schofield) (PP) – 50:29	8–0
Zumwinkle (Dunne, Guilday) – 50:45	9–0

6 min
Penalties
10 min
57
Shots
4

30 August 2022; 16:00	Switzerland	0–4 (0–2, 0–2, 0–0)	Finland	KVIK Hockey Arena, Herning; Attendance: 1,201

Game reference

Andrea Brändli
Saskia Maurer
Goalies
Anni Keisala
Jenna Silvonen
Referees:
(Germany) Tijana Haack
(United States) Samantha Hiller
Linesmen:
(Sweden) Anna Hammar
(Finland) Tiina Saarimäki

0–1	02:51 – Tapani (Nieminen, Laitinen)
0–2	06:25 – Holopainen (Tulus)
0–3	27:49 – Parkkonen (Karvinen, Tapani)
0–4	39:22 – Savolainen (Laitinen, Vainikka) (PP2)

10 min
Penalties
6 min
6
Shots
44

30 August 2022; 20:00	Canada	2–5 (2–0, 0–2, 0–3)	United States	KVIK Hockey Arena, Herning; Attendance: 1,216

Game reference

Emerance Maschmeyer
Goalies
Nicole Hensley
Referees:
(Finland) Anniina Nurmi
(United States) Amanda Tassoni
Linesmen:
(United States) Jennifer Cameron
(Canada) Justine Todd

Fillier (Fast, Potomak) – 03:29	1–0
Shelton (Bach, O'Neill) (PP) – 18:12	2–0
	2–1	24:16 – Keller (Bilka, Knight) (PP)
	2–2	31:11 – Pannek (Barnes)
	2–3	43:14 – Eden (Harmon, Keller)
	2–4	53:28 – Coyne Schofield (Harmon)
	2–5	59:06 – Knight (Heise, Guilday)

4 min
Penalties
4 min
28
Shots
33

=== Group B ===
Pos	Team	Pld	W	OTW	OTL	L	GF	GA	GD	Pts	Qualification or relegation
1	Czechia	4	4	0	0	0	21	2	+19	12	Quarterfinals
2	Sweden	4	1	2	0	1	12	10	+2	7	Quarterfinals
3	Hungary	4	1	0	1	2	7	13	−6	4 (Note: Germany 2–4 Hungary)	Quarterfinals
4	Germany	4	1	0	1	2	8	16	−8	4	
5	Denmark (H)	4	1	0	0	3	6	13	−7	3	Relegated to the 2023 Division I A

Source: IIHF
Rules for classification: 1) points; 2) head-to-head points; 3) head-to-head goal difference; 4) head-to-head number of goals scored; 5) result against closest best-ranked team outside tied teams; 6) result against second-best ranked team outside tied teams; 7) seeding before tournament.
(H) Host
Notes:

25 August 2022; 15:30	Germany	2–4 (2–1, 0–2, 0–1)	Hungary	Scanel Hockey Arena, Frederikshavn; Attendance: 526

Game reference

Franziska Albl
Goalies
Anikó Németh
Referees:
(Finland) Kaisa Ketonen
(Canada) Shauna Neary
Linesmen:
(Canada) Marie-Pierre Jalbert
(Finland) Tiina Saarimäki

Lu. Welcke (Strompf, Botthof) – 01:56	1–0
Kluge (Eisenschmid, Jobst-Smith) (PP) – 10:29	2–0
	2–1	10:54 – Kiss-Simon (Seregély)
	2–2	23:19 – Kiss-Simon (Mayer, Gasparics) (PP)
	2–3	35:19 – Jókai-Szilágyi (SH)
	2–4	59:51 – Seregély (EN)

10 min
Penalties
10 min
28
Shots
25

25 August 2022; 19:30	Denmark	2–5 (1–1, 0–2, 1–2)	Sweden	Scanel Hockey Arena, Frederikshavn; Attendance: 1,496

Game reference

Cassandra Repstock-Romme
Goalies
Emma Söderberg
Referees:
(United States) Kaylen Hanson
(Austria) Julia Kainberger
Linesmen:
(Slovakia) Magda Jonáková
(Canada) Justine Todd

Russell (Andersen, Glud) – 01:51	1–0
	1–1	01:51 – Olsson (Carlsson)
	1–2	33:42 – Olsson (Kjellbin, Jungåker)
	1–3	34:03 – Nylén Persson (L. Johansson, Jungåker)
	1–4	48:07 – Löwenhielm (Bouveng, Lundin)
Jakobsen (Persson, Asperup) – 51:05	2–4
	2–5	56:38 – Olsson (Jungåker, Nylén Persson) (PP2)

12 min
Penalties
8 min
28
Shots
36

26 August 2022; 19:00	Hungary	1–7 (0–2, 1–2, 0–3)	Czechia	Scanel Hockey Arena, Frederikshavn; Attendance: 250

Game reference

Anikó Németh
Goalies
Klára Peslarová
Referees:
(Germany) Tijana Haack
(United States) Samantha Hiller
Linesmen:
(Belgium) Marine Dinant
(Finland) Linnea Sainio

	0–1	01:02 – Hymlarová (Horálková, Pejzlová)
	0–2	02:21 – Pejšová (Lásková)
	0–3	29:59 – Radová (Horálková)
	0–4	33:07 – Šapovalivová (Mrázová, Pejšová) (PP)
Huszák (Jókai-Szilágyi) (PP) – 35:18	1–4
	1–5	44:26 – Mlýnková (Sarnovská)
	1–6	47:35 – Šapovalivová
	1–7	57:36 – Sarnovská

14 min
Penalties
12 min
7
Shots
45

27 August 2022; 15:30	Sweden	4–3 GWS (0–0, 2–0, 1–3) (OT: 0–0) (SO: 1–0)	Germany	Scanel Hockey Arena, Frederikshavn; Attendance: 395

Game reference

Emma Söderberg
Goalies
Sandra Abstreiter
Referees:
(Latvia) Agnese Kārkliņa
(Canada) Shauna Neary
Linesmen:
(Canada) Marie-Pierre Jalbert
(Finland) Linnea Sainio

Ljungblom (Johansson, Jungåker) (PP) – 32:48	1–0
Olsson (Waxin, Carlsson) – 35:40	2–0
Bergström (Ljungblom) – 46:59	3–0
	3–1	52:43 – Christof (T. Eisenschmid, Bartsch) (PP)
	3–2	56:31 – N. Eisenschmid (T. Eisenschmid, Kluge) (PP)
	3–3	59:18 – T. Eisenschmid (Kluge, Feldmeier) (PP, EA)

Olsson
Jungåker
Wikner-Zienkiewicz (miss)
Shootout
(miss) Feldmeier
(miss) Kluge
(miss) Jobst-Smith
(miss) N. Eisenschmid
33 min
Penalties
8 min
31
Shots
24

27 August 2022; 19:30	Czechia	5–1 (1–1, 1–0, 3–0)	Denmark	Scanel Hockey Arena, Frederikshavn; Attendance: 766

Game reference

Klára Peslarová
Goalies
Lisa Jensen
Referees:
(United States) Kaylen Hanson
(Finland) Kaisa Ketonen
Linesmen:
(Belgium) Marine Dinant
(Sweden) Anna Hammar

	0–1	12:34 – Weis (PP)
Mrázová (Lásková, Mlýnková) (PP) – 17:57	1–1
Mlýnková (Mrázová) (PP2) – 35:38	2–1
Pejšová (Lásková) – 40:37	3–1
Pejzlová (Horálková, Křížová) (PP) – 55:16	4–1
Pejšová (Mlýnková) (PP) – 58:20	5–1

10 min
Penalties
18 min
49
Shots
13

28 August 2022; 17:00	Denmark	1–0 (0–0, 0–0, 1–0)	Hungary	Scanel Hockey Arena, Frederikshavn; Attendance: 719

Game reference
Lisa Jensen	Goalies	Anikó Németh	Referees: (Finland) Anniina Nurmi (United States) Amanda Tassoni; Linesmen: (United States) Jennifer Cameron (Canada) Jessica Chartrand
Østergaard (Jakobsen) – 53:05 / 1–0			Referees: (Finland) Anniina Nurmi (United States) Amanda Tassoni; Linesmen: (United States) Jennifer Cameron (Canada) Jessica Chartrand
16 min	Penalties	8 min	Referees: (Finland) Anniina Nurmi (United States) Amanda Tassoni; Linesmen: (United States) Jennifer Cameron (Canada) Jessica Chartrand
19	Shots	45	Referees: (Finland) Anniina Nurmi (United States) Amanda Tassoni; Linesmen: (United States) Jennifer Cameron (Canada) Jessica Chartrand

29 August 2022; 15:30	Germany	0–6 (0–2, 0–3, 0–1)	Czechia	Scanel Hockey Arena, Frederikshavn; Attendance: 332

Game reference

Sandra Abstreiter
Franziska Albl
Goalies
Klára Peslarová
Blanka Škodová
Referees:
(Latvia) Agnese Kārkliņa
(Finland) Anniina Nurmi
Linesmen:
(United States) Jennifer Cameron
(Belgium) Marine Dinant

0–1	12:02 – Šapovalivová (Pejšová, Mrázová) (PP)
0–2	16:43 – Mlýnková (Mrázová, Lásková) (PP)
0–3	28:56 – Mills
0–4	31:42 – Neubauerová (Mills, Lásková)
0–5	39:10 – Sarnovská (Mrázová, Tejralová)
0–6	41:06 – Hymlarová (Křížová, Tejralová)

12 min
Penalties
2 min
9
Shots
32

29 August 2022; 19:30	Hungary	2–3 GWS (1–1, 0–1, 1–0) (OT: 0–0) (SO: 0–1)	Sweden	Scanel Hockey Arena, Frederikshavn; Attendance: 345

Game reference

Anikó Németh
Goalies
Ida Boman
Referees:
(Slovakia) Nikoleta Celárová
(Canada) Cianna Lieffers
Linesmen:
(Canada) Jessica Chartrand
(Finland) Linnea Sainio

	0–1	17:36 – Jungåker (Lundin) (PP)
Kreisz (Gasparics) (PP) – 04:07	1–1
	1–2	25:10 – L. Johansson (Nylén Persson, Jungåker) (PP)
Kiss-Simon (Huszák, Mayer) – 48:19	2–2

Kreisz (miss)
Gasparics (miss)
Huszák (miss)
Seregély (miss)
Mayer (miss)
Seregély (miss)
Dabasi (miss)
Gasparics (miss)
Shootout
(miss) Olsson
(miss) Jungåker
(miss) Nylén Persson
(miss) Bouveng
(miss) Wikner-Zienkiewicz
(miss) Olsson
(miss) Jungåker
Olsson
4 min
Penalties
15 min
42
Shots
40

30 August 2022; 15:30	Sweden	0–3 (0–0, 0–1, 0–2)	Czechia	Scanel Hockey Arena, Frederikshavn; Attendance: 337

Game reference

Emma Söderberg
Goalies
Klára Peslarová
Referees:
(Austria) Julia Kainberger
(Latvia) Agnese Kārkliņa
Linesmen:
(Canada) Jessica Chartrand
(Canada) Marie-Pierre Jalbert

0–1	29:11 – Přibylová (Neubauerová, Horálková)
0–2	49:40 – Mlýnková (Pátková, Pejšová)
0–3	52:12 – Hymlarová (Křížová) (EN)

6 min
Penalties
6 min
27
Shots
24

30 August 2022; 19:30	Denmark	2–3 (1–1, 1–0, 0–2)	Germany	Scanel Hockey Arena, Frederikshavn; Attendance: 1,150

Game reference

Cassandra Repstock-Romme
Goalies
Sandra Abstreiter
Referees:
(United States) Kaylen Hanson
(Canada) Shauna Neary
Linesmen:
(Belgium) Marine Dinant
(Slovakia) Magda Jonáková

Persson (Glud, Andersen) – 04:40	1–0
	1–1	08:05 – Feldmeier (Jobst-Smith, N. Eisenschmid) (PP)
Russell-Simon (Jakobsen) – 28:57	2–1
	2–2	55:49 – Kluge (Welcke)
	2–3	59:59 – T. Eisenschmid (EA)

4 min
Penalties
4 min
11
Shots
41

== Knockout stage ==
There was a re-seeding after the quarterfinals.

Rank	Team	Grp	Pos	Pts	GD	GF	Seed
1	United States	A	1	12	+27	30	2
2	Canada	A	2	9	+12	19	1
3	Finland	A	3	6	+2	15	3
4	Switzerland	A	4	3	−14	4	4
5	Japan	A	5	0	−27	4	6
6	Czechia	B	1	12	+19	21	7
7	Sweden	B	2	9	+2	12	8
8	Hungary	B	3	6	−6	7	11

=== Bracket ===
Quarterfinals
1 September
United States	12
Hungary	1
1 September
Canada	3
Sweden	0
1 September
Finland	1
Czechia (OT)	2
1 September
Switzerland (GWS)	2
Japan	1

Semifinals
3 September
United States	10
Czechia	1
3 September
Canada	8
Switzerland	1

Final
4 September
United States	1
Canada	2
Third place
4 September
Switzerland	2
Czechia	4

=== Quarterfinals ===
1 September 2022; 12:15	Switzerland	2–1 GWS (0–0, 0–1, 1–0) (OT: 0–0) (SO: 2–0)	Japan	KVIK Hockey Arena, Herning; Attendance: 891

Game reference
Andrea Brändli	Goalies	Miyuu Masuhara	Referees: (Austria) Julia Kainberger (Canada) Cianna Lieffers; Linesmen: (Sweden) Anna Hammar (Finland) Tiina Saarimäki
/ 0–1 / 34:35 – Ito (Hitosato); Leemann (Raselli) (SH) – 46:01 / 1–1			Referees: (Austria) Julia Kainberger (Canada) Cianna Lieffers; Linesmen: (Sweden) Anna Hammar (Finland) Tiina Saarimäki
Marti; Rüegg (miss); Leemann	Shootout	(miss) Enomoto; (miss) Toko; (miss) Ak. Shiga; (miss) Ao. Shiga	Referees: (Austria) Julia Kainberger (Canada) Cianna Lieffers; Linesmen: (Sweden) Anna Hammar (Finland) Tiina Saarimäki
2 min	Penalties	8 min	Referees: (Austria) Julia Kainberger (Canada) Cianna Lieffers; Linesmen: (Sweden) Anna Hammar (Finland) Tiina Saarimäki
24	Shots	33	Referees: (Austria) Julia Kainberger (Canada) Cianna Lieffers; Linesmen: (Sweden) Anna Hammar (Finland) Tiina Saarimäki

1 September 2022; 16:00	United States	12–1 (1–0, 9–0, 2–1)	Hungary	KVIK Hockey Arena, Herning; Attendance: 923

Game reference

Nicole Hensley
Aerin Frankel
Goalies
Anikó Németh
Zsuzsa Révész
Referees:
(Germany) Tijana Haack
(United States) Samantha Hiller
Linesmen:
(Canada) Marie-Pierre Jalbert
(Canada) Justine Todd

Heise (Dunne, Kessel) – 01:36	1–0
Heise (Kessel, Dunne) – 21:25	2–0
Bilka (Brandt) – 22:09	3–0
Pannek (Kessel, Coyne Schofield) – 24:02	4–0
Roque (Kessel, Coyne Schofield) (PP) – 25:20	5–0
Dunne (Barnes, Heise) – 30:14	6–0
Bilka (Knight, Harvey) – 32:39	7–0
Stecklein (Kessel, Harvey) – 35:17	8–0
Brandt (Harvey, Bilka) – 35:49	9–0
Heise (Carpenter, Roque) – 38:00	10–0
Knight (Bilka, Brandt) – 43:00	11–0
	11–1	52:51 – Metzler (Huszák, Knee) (PP)
Bilka (Keller, Guilday) – 54:42	12–1

6 min
Penalties
4 min
69
Shots
10

1 September 2022; 17:30	Finland	1–2 OT (0–0, 0–1, 1–0) (OT: 0–1)	Czechia	Scanel Hockey Arena, Frederikshavn; Attendance: 326

Game reference

Anni Keisala
Goalies
Klára Peslarová
Referees:
(United States) Kaylen Hanson
(Canada) Shauna Neary
Linesmen:
(Canada) Jessica Chartrand
(Belgium) Marine Dinant

	0–1	37:00 – Pejšová (Mills)
Tulus (Holopainen, Rantala) – 48:01	1–1
	1–2	60:41 – Tejralová

6 min
Penalties
6 min
37
Shots
33

1 September 2022; 20:00	Canada	3–0 (1–0, 1–0, 1–0)	Sweden	KVIK Hockey Arena, Herning; Attendance: 927

Game reference

Ann-Renée Desbiens
Goalies
Emma Söderberg
Referees:
(Finland) Anniina Nurmi
(United States) Amanda Tassoni
Linesmen:
(United States) Jennifer Cameron
(Slovakia) Magda Jonáková

Larocque (Fast, Poulin) – 17:11	1–0
Potomak (Shelton) – 33:56	2–0
Ambrose (Potomak, Maltais) – 53:10	3–0

8 min
Penalties
16 min
57
Shots
9

=== 5th–8th place semifinals ===
3 September 2022; 12:00	Finland	3–2 OT (1–0, 1–2, 0–0) (OT: 1–0)	Hungary	Scanel Hockey Arena, Frederikshavn; Attendance: 344

Game reference

Anni Keisala
Goalies
Anikó Németh
Referees:
(United States) Kaylen Hanson
(Latvia) Agnese Kārkliņa
Linesmen:
(Canada) Marie-Pierre Jalbert
(Slovakia) Magda Jonáková

Tapani (Nieminen, Parkkonen) – 06:55	1–0
Tulus (Nieminen, Savolainen) – 20:58	2–0
	2–1	23:30 – Metzler (Strobl)
	2–2	31:45 – Huszák (Szamosfalvi)
Holopainen (Tapani, Laitinen) – 61:26	3–2

10 min
Penalties
4 min
38
Shots
18

3 September 2022; 16:00	Japan	5–4 (0–3, 3–0, 2–1)	Sweden	Scanel Hockey Arena, Frederikshavn; Attendance: 378

Game reference

Miyuu Masuhara
Goalies
Emma Söderberg
Referees:
(Slovakia) Nikoleta Celárová
(Finland) Kaisa Ketonen
Linesmen:
(Belgium) Marine Dinant
(Finland) Linnea Sainio

	0–1	06:33 – Murén (T. Johansson)
	0–2	10:18 – Carlsson (Olsson, Adolfsson)
	0–3	19:56 – Nylén Persson (Olsson) (PP)
Toko (Hitosato, Enomoto) (PP) – 24:01	1–3
Enomoto (Ito, Toko) (PP) – 25:19	2–3
Ito (Toko, Hikosato) (PP) – 39:19	3–3
Toko (Shiga) – 47:22	4–3
	4–4	Olsson (Hjalmarsson) – 48:40
Koyama (Yamashita) – 57:12	5–4

8 min
Penalties
6 min
28
Shots
36

=== Semifinals ===
3 September 2022; 14:00	United States	10–1 (6–0, 2–1, 2–0)	Czechia	KVIK Hockey Arena, Herning; Attendance: 851

Game reference

Nicole Hensley
Goalies
Klára Peslarová
Blanka Škodová
Referees:
(Austria) Julia Kainberger
(United States) Amanda Tassoni
Linesmen:
(United States) Jennifer Cameron
(Canada) Jessica Chartrand

Heise (Carpenter) – 07:53	1–0
Scamurra (Zumwinkle, Compher) – 09:50	2–0
Kessel (Heise) – 10:47	3–0
Knight (Heise, Keller) (PP) – 14:56	4–0
Knight (Bilka, Dunne) – 18:18	5–0
Compher (Eden, Keller) – 19:25	6–0
Kessel (Roque, Harvey) – 26:56	7–0
	7–1	31:16 – Hymlarová (Křížová, Tejralová)
Kessel (Heise) – 31:30	8–1
Harvey (Scamurra) – 50:36	9–1
Heise (Kessel) – 52:33	10–1

6 min
Penalties
12 min
39
Shots
10

3 September 2022; 18:00	Canada	8–1 (2–0, 2–1, 4–0)	Switzerland	KVIK Hockey Arena, Herning; Attendance: 864

Game reference

Ann-Renée Desbiens
Goalies
Saskia Maurer
Referees:
(Germany) Tijana Haack
(United States) Samantha Hiller
Linesmen:
(Finland) Tiina Saarimäki
(Canada) Justine Todd

O'Neill (Shelton) – 13:37	1–0
Eldridge (Maltais, Shelton) – 13:47	2–0
Jenner (Larocque) – 23:00	3–0
Fillier (Clark) – 27:32	4–0
	4–1	32:31 – Christen (Stalder, Leemann) (PP2)
Poulin (Potomak, Fast) – 41:17	5–1
Nurse (Fillier, Poulin) (PP) – 43:39	6–1
Poulin (Potomak, Jenner) – 45:14	7–1
Clark (Fillier) – 54:13	8–1

10 min
Penalties
8 min
56
Shots
6

=== Fifth place game ===
4 September 2022; 11:00	Finland	0–1 GWS (0–0, 0–0, 0–0) (OT: 0–0) (SO: 1–2)	Japan	Scanel Hockey Arena, Frederikshavn; Attendance: 303

Game reference
Anni Keisala	Goalies	Miyuu Masuhara	Referees: (United States) Kaylen Hanson (Canada) Shauna Neary; Linesmen: (Canada) Marie-Pierre Jalbert (Slovakia) Magda Jonáková
Tulus; Nieminen (miss); Karvinen (miss); Holopainen (miss); Vainikka (miss)	Shootout	(miss) Ito; (miss) Ak. Shiga; Toko; Koyama	Referees: (United States) Kaylen Hanson (Canada) Shauna Neary; Linesmen: (Canada) Marie-Pierre Jalbert (Slovakia) Magda Jonáková
0 min	Penalties	2 min	Referees: (United States) Kaylen Hanson (Canada) Shauna Neary; Linesmen: (Canada) Marie-Pierre Jalbert (Slovakia) Magda Jonáková
61	Shots	17	Referees: (United States) Kaylen Hanson (Canada) Shauna Neary; Linesmen: (Canada) Marie-Pierre Jalbert (Slovakia) Magda Jonáková

=== Third place game ===
4 September 2022; 15:00	Switzerland	2–4 (1–2, 0–2, 1–0)	Czechia	KVIK Hockey Arena, Herning; Attendance: 1,294

Game reference

Andrea Brändli
Goalies
Klára Peslarová
Referees:
(United States) Samantha Hiller
(Canada) Cianna Lieffers
Linesmen:
(United States) Jennifer Cameron
(Sweden) Anna Hammar

	0–1	07:03 – Mlýnková (Mrázová, Tejralová) (PP)
Marti (Christen, Leemann) (PP) – 11:19	1–1
	1–2	15:07 – Pejšová (Lásková)
	1–3	22:06 – Přibylová (Neubauerová, Peslarová)
	1–4	29:59 – Mlýnková (Mrázová)
Vallario (Rüegg, Stalder (PP) – 49:11	2–4

12 min
Penalties
14 min
20
Shots
27

=== Final ===
4 September 2022; 19:30	United States	1–2 (0–0, 1–2, 0–0)	Canada	KVIK Hockey Arena, Herning; Attendance: 1,738

Game reference

Nicole Hensley
Goalies
Ann-Renée Desbiens
Referees:
(Finland) Anniina Nurmi
(United States) Amanda Tassoni
Linesmen:
(Finland) Tiina Saarimäki
(Canada) Justine Todd

	0–1	29:30 – Jenner (Poulin, Shelton)
	0–2	30:54 – Jenner (Fillier, Nurse) (PP)
Roque (Kessel, Coyne Schofield) (PP) – 39:39	1–2

8 min
Penalties
6 min
21
Shots
19

== Awards and statistics ==
The awards were announced on 4 September 2022.

=== Awards ===
Directorate Awards

Position	Player
Goaltender	(United States) Nicole Hensley
Defenceman	(Czech Republic) Daniela Pejšová
Forward	(United States) Taylor Heise
MVP	(United States) Taylor Heise

All-Star team

Position	Player
Goaltender	(Czech Republic) Klára Peslarová
Defenceman	(Czech Republic) Daniela Pejšová
Defenceman	(United States) Caroline Harvey
Forward	(United States) Taylor Heise
Forward	(Canada) Sarah Fillier
Forward	(United States) Amanda Kessel

=== Scoring leaders ===
List shows the top skaters sorted by points, then goals.

As of 4 September 2022

Player	GP	G	A	Pts	+/−	PIM	POS
(United States) Taylor Heise	7	7	11	18	+16	2	F
(United States) Amanda Kessel	7	6	11	17	+17	4	F
(United States) Hannah Bilka	7	5	7	12	+13	4	F
(Canada) Sarah Fillier	7	5	6	11	+4	6	F
(United States) Kendall Coyne Schofield	7	1	10	11	+5	2	F
(Canada) Marie-Philip Poulin	7	5	5	10	+4	6	F
(United States) Hilary Knight	7	6	3	9	+11	0	F
(Czech Republic) Daniela Pejšová	7	5	4	9	+6	6	D
(United States) Alexandra Carpenter	7	2	7	9	+15	0	F
(Canada) Ella Shelton	7	2	7	9	+8	0	D

GP = Games played; G = Goals; A = Assists; Pts = Points; +/− = Plus/minus; PIM = Penalties in minutes; POS = Position
Source: IIHF

=== Leading goaltenders ===
Only the top five goaltenders, based on save percentage, who have played at least 40% of their team's minutes, are included in this list.

As of 4 September 2022

Player	TOI	GA	GAA	SA	Sv%	SO
(Denmark) Lisa Jensen	120:00	5	2.50	94	94.68	1
(Canada) Ann-Renée Desbiens	300:00	4	0.80	61	93.44	1
(Finland) Anni Keisala	350:32	12	2.05	183	93.44	1
(United States) Nicole Hensley	277:21	5	1.08	71	92.96	1
(Japan) Miyuu Masuhara	349:48	19	3.26	223	91.48	1

TOI = Time on ice (minutes:seconds); SA = Shots against; GA = Goals against; GAA = Goals against average; Sv% = Save percentage; SO = Shutouts
Source: IIHF

== Final standings ==
Pos	Grp	Team	Pld	W	OTW	OTL	L	GF	GA	GD	Pts	Final result
1	A	Canada	7	6	0	0	1	32	9	+23	18	Champions
2	A	United States	7	6	0	0	1	53	7	+46	18	Runners-up
3	B	Czechia	7	5	1	0	1	28	15	+13	17	Third place
4	A	Switzerland	7	1	1	0	5	9	31	−22	5	Fourth place
5	A	Japan	7	1	1	1	4	11	37	−26	6	Fifth place game
6	A	Finland	7	2	1	2	2	19	18	+1	10	Fifth place game
7	B	Sweden	6	1	2	0	3	16	18	−2	7	
8	B	Hungary	6	1	0	2	3	10	28	−18	5	
9	B	Germany	4	1	0	1	2	8	16	−8	4	Eliminated in Preliminary round
10	B	Denmark	4	1	0	0	3	6	13	−7	3	Relegated to the 2023 Division I A

Source: IIHF
Rules for classification: 1) position in the group; 2) number of points; 3) goal difference; 4) goals scored; 5) seeding before tournament.
