= List of indoor arenas in Denmark =

The following is a list of indoor arenas in Denmark. Capacity figures are based on the venue's capacity for sports events.

== Existing arenas ==
=== Multi arenas ===
Images	Stadium	Capacity for sports	Capacity for concerts	City	Home team	Opened
	Royal Arena	12,500	17,000	Copenhagen	None	2017
	Jyske Bank Boxen	12,000	15,000	Herning	None	2010
	Ballerup Super Arena	7,580	9,200	Copenhagen	None	2001
	Sydbank Arena	5,001		Kolding	KIF Kolding	1996
	Ceres Arena	5,001	5,000	Århus	Skanderborg Aarhus Håndbold, Bakken Bears (Some Games)	2001
	Brøndbyhallen	5,000		Copenhagen		1973
	Gigantium	5,000		Aalborg	Aalborg Håndbold	1999
	Syd Energi Arena	5,000		Haderslev	SønderjyskE Ishockey	2011
	K.B. Hallen	4,500	4,950	Copenhagen	Kjøbenhavns Boldklub	1938/2019
	Arena Randers (Arena 1)	4,200	6,000	Randers		2020
	Forum Horsens	4,000	5,000	Horsens	HH Elite, Horsens IC	2004
	Gråkjær Arena	3,250		Holstebro	TTH Holstebro, Holstebro Håndbold	2011
	Royal Stage Hillerød	3.017	4,000	Hillerød		2020
	Farum Arena	3,000	10,000	Farum		2000
	Blue Water Dokken	3,000	4,500	Esbjerg	Team Esbjerg, Ribe-Esbjerg HH	2012
	Jyske Bank Arena	4,000	5,000	Odense	Odense Håndbold	2007
	Vibocold Arena	3,000	4,000	Viborg	Viborg HK	1997
	Skjern Bank Arena	2,800		Skjern	Skjern Håndbold	2013
	Jysk Arena	2,567		Silkeborg	Bjerringbro-Silkeborg, Silkeborg-Voel KFUM	1986
	Arena Randers (Arena 2)	2,500	4,000	Randers	Randers HK	1954
	Arena Nord	2,500	4,000	Frederikshavn	Ffi Håndbold/Sæby HK	2003
	Ikast-Brande Arena	2,500	3,000	Ikast		1968
	Sydbank Arena Odense	2,256	3,000	Odense	Odense Håndbold	1967
	Vejle Spektrum	2,100	5,000	Vejle		2015

=== Ice Hockey arenas ===
Images	Stadium	Capacity for sports	Capacity for concerts	City	Home team	Opened
	Sparekassen Danmark Isarena	5,200	8,500	Aalborg	Aalborg Pirates	2007
	Frøs Arena	5,000		Vojens	SønderjyskE Ishockey	2011
	Granly Hockey Arena	4,200		Esbjerg	Esbjerg Energy	1974
	KVIK Hockey Arena	4,120		Herning	Herning Blue Fox	1987
	Scanel Hockey Arena	4,000		Frederikshavn	Frederikshavn White Hawks	1954
Bryggeriet Vestfyen Arena	Spar Nord Arena	3,280		Odense	Odense Bulldogs	1999
	Holger Danske Arena	3,600		Rødovre	Rødovre Mighty Bulls	1995
	Concordium Arena	2,460		Rungsted	Rungsted Seier Capital	1971
	PM Montage Arena	1,740		Herlev	Herlev Eagles	1977

=== Messecenters ===
Images	Stadium	Capacity for sports	Capacity for concerts	City	Home team	Opened
	Bella Center Copenhagen; Hall D (Bella Arena)	7,000		Copenhagen	None	1965
	MCH Messecenter; Hall M	8,000	9,100	Herning	None	2004

== See also ==
- List of indoor arenas in Europe
- List of indoor arenas by capacity
- Lists of stadiums
