= 2022 IIHF Women's World Championship final =

	1	2	3	Total
United States	0	1	0	1
Canada	0	2	0	2
- Date: 4 September
- Arena: KVIK Hockey Arena
- City: Herning
- Attendance: 1,738

The 2022 IIHF Women's World Championship final was played on 4 September 2022, at KVIK Hockey Arena in Herning, Denmark. Canada defeated the United States 2–1 in to win their 12th title.

== Background ==
Since the first IIHF Women's World Championship in 1990 and the first women's tournament at the Winter Olympics in 1998, the American and Canadian national teams have played in the finals on all occasions except for the 2006 Winter Olympics, when Sweden played Canada, and the 2019 IIHF Women's World Championship, when Finland played the United States.

== Road to the final ==
United States
Round
Canada
Opponent
Result
Preliminary round
Opponent
Result
Japan
10–2
Game 1
Finland
4–1
Finland
6–1
Game 2
Switzerland
4–1
Switzerland
9–0
Game 3
Japan
5–0
Canada
5–2
Game 4
United States
2–5
Both teams played in Group A.

Pos	Team	Pld	W	OTW	OTL	L	GF	GA	GD	Pts	Qualification
1	United States	4	4	0	0	0	30	3	+27	12	Quarterfinals
2	Canada	4	3	0	0	1	19	7	+12	9	Quarterfinals
3	Finland	4	2	0	0	2	15	13	+2	6	Quarterfinals
4	Switzerland	4	1	0	0	3	4	18	−14	3	Quarterfinals
5	Japan	4	0	0	0	4	4	31	−27	0	Quarterfinals

Source: IIHF
Rules for classification: 1) points; 2) head-to-head points; 3) head-to-head goal difference; 4) head-to-head number of goals scored; 5) result against closest best-ranked team outside tied teams; 6) result against second-best ranked team outside tied teams; 7) seeding before tournament.
Opponent
Result
Playoff
Opponent
Result
Hungary
12–1
Quarterfinals
Sweden
3–0
Czechia
10–1
Semifinals
Switzerland
8–1

== Match ==
4 September 2022; 19:30	United States	1–2 (0–0, 1–2, 0–0)	Canada	KVIK Hockey Arena, Herning; Attendance: 1,738

Game reference

Nicole Hensley
Goalies
Ann-Renée Desbiens
Referees:
(Finland) Anniina Nurmi
(United States) Amanda Tassoni
Linesmen:
(Finland) Tiina Saarimäki
(Canada) Justine Todd

	0–1	29:30 – Jenner (Poulin, Shelton)
	0–2	30:54 – Jenner (Fillier, Nurse) (PP)
Roque (Kessel, Coyne Schofield) (PP) – 39:39	1–2

8 min
Penalties
6 min
21
Shots
19
