= Rebecca Leslie =

Canadian ice hockey player (born 1996)

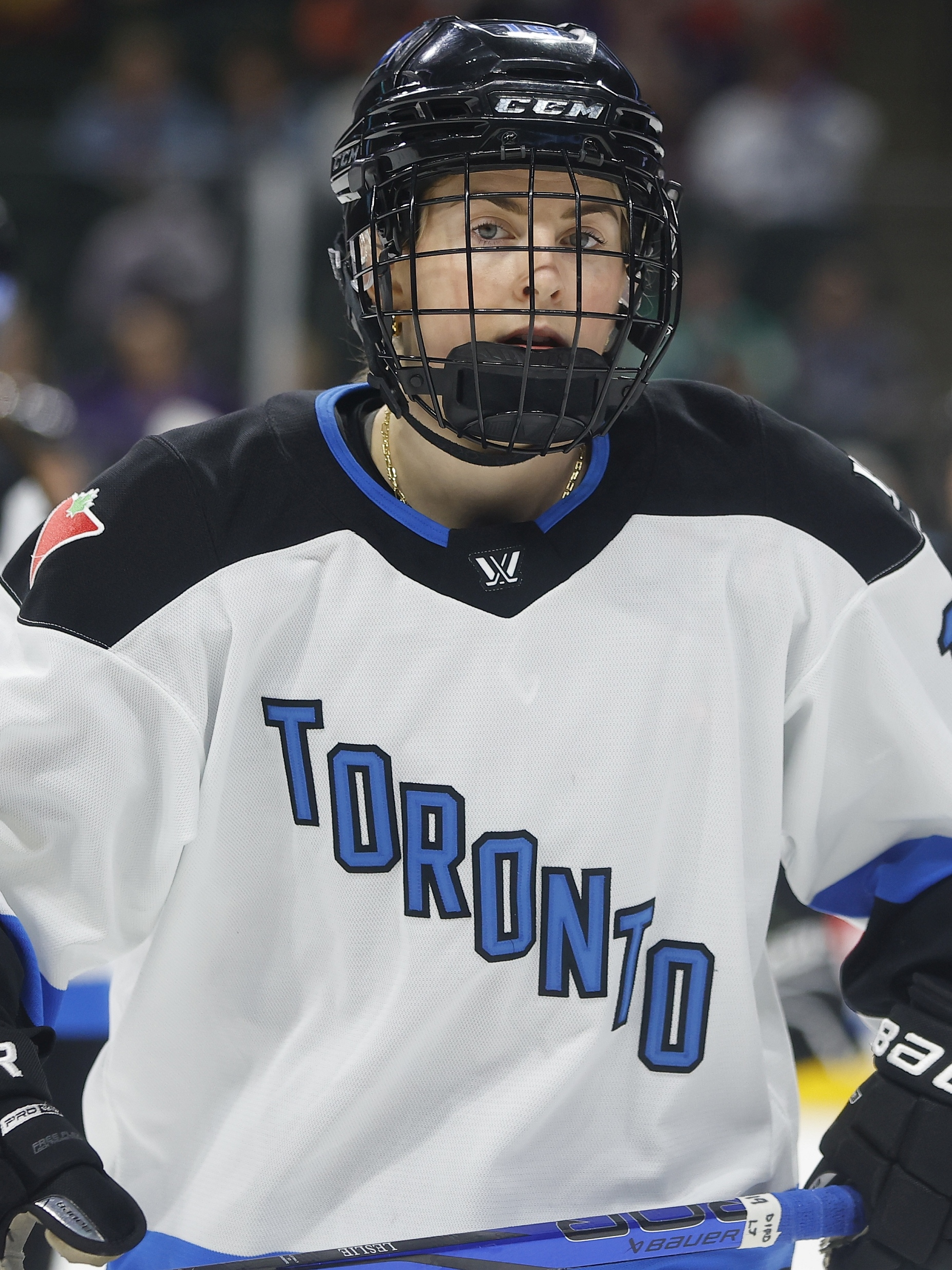
- Leslie with PWHL Toronto in 2024
- Born: May 8, 1996 (age 30) Ottawa, Ontario, Canada
- Height: 168 cm (5 ft 6 in)
- Position: Forward
- Shoots: Right
- PWHL team Former teams: Ottawa Charge; Calgary Inferno; PWHL Toronto
- National team: Canada
- Playing career: 2018–present
Medal record
World Championships
Silver medal – second place	2026 Denmark

Rebecca Leslie (born May 8, 1996) is a Canadian ice hockey forward who plays professionally for the Ottawa Charge in the Professional Women's Hockey League (PWHL).

== Playing career ==
Over her four-year collegiate career at Boston University, Leslie amassed 171 points in 139 games and served as team captain in her senior season. In 2018, she began her professional career by signing with the Calgary Inferno of the CWHL, where she won the Clarkson Cup and was a finalist for Rookie of the Year. Following the league's closure, she announced her decision to join the newly established PWHPA.

Leslie was selected in the 12th round of the 2023 PWHL Draft by PWHL Toronto and went on to sign a one-year deal with the team in November of that year. During her time with Toronto, she tallied two goals and seven assists over 24 games. On June 24, 2024, she signed a one-year contract with PWHL Ottawa. In the 2024–25 season, she contributed one goal and two assists across 27 games. In the 2025 PWHL playoffs, she added two goals and an assist in eight games. On June 18, 2025, she secured a two-year contract extension with the Charge.

=== International ===
In 2014, Leslie tallied five points across five games while representing Canada's U18 team, helping them capture gold at the IIHF Women’s World Junior Championship. She made her debut with the senior national team in 2019 during the Rivalry Series. She made her Women’s World Championship debut in 2026, scoring a goal in the first game of the tournament for Canada.

== Awards and honours ==
- 2025 PWHL Intact Impact Award (honours one player from each team who best displayed leadership, integrity and commitment)

== Personal life ==
Her brother, Zac Leslie, is also a professional ice hockey player who has primarily competed in the AHL, the top developmental league for the NHL.

== Career statistics ==
=== Regular season and playoffs ===
			Regular season					Playoffs
Season	Team	League	GP	G	A	Pts	PIM	GP	G	A	Pts	PIM
2011–12	Ottawa Lady Senators	Prov. WHL	12	3	4	7	2	—	—	—	—	—
2012–13	Ottawa Lady Senators	Prov. WHL	37	18	18	36	32	4	4	1	5	0
2013–14	Ottawa Lady Senators	Prov. WHL	38	25	27	52	26	3	0	1	1	0
2014–15	Boston University	HE	35	14	17	31	6	—	—	—	—	—
2015–16	Boston University	HE	39	15	34	49	14	—	—	—	—	—
2016–17	Boston University	HE	32	16	18	34	8	—	—	—	—	—
2017–18	Boston University	HE	33	24	33	57	22	—	—	—	—	—
2018–19	Calgary Inferno	CWHL	27	11	15	26	16	4	2	0	2	4
2020–21	Team Bauer	PWHPA	4	2	2	4	2	—	—	—	—	—
2021–22	Team Harvey's	PWHPA	6	4	4	8	0	—	—	—	—	—
2022–23	Team Sonnet	PWHPA	20	0	3	3	2	—	—	—	—	—
2023–24	PWHL Toronto	PWHL	24	2	7	9	12	5	1	0	1	0
2024–25	Ottawa Charge	PWHL	27	1	2	3	4	8	2	1	3	6
2025–26	Ottawa Charge	PWHL	30	14	9	23	10	8	4	2	6	2
PWHL totals			81	17	18	35	26	21	7	3	10	8

=== International ===
Year	Team	Event	Result	GP	G	A	Pts	PIM
2014	Canada	U18	1st place, gold medalist(s)	5	2	3	5	4
Junior totals				5	2	3	5	4

== Awards and honours ==
Honors	Year	Ref
PWHL
All-Second Team	2026	
