= Rory Guilday =

American ice hockey player (born 2002)

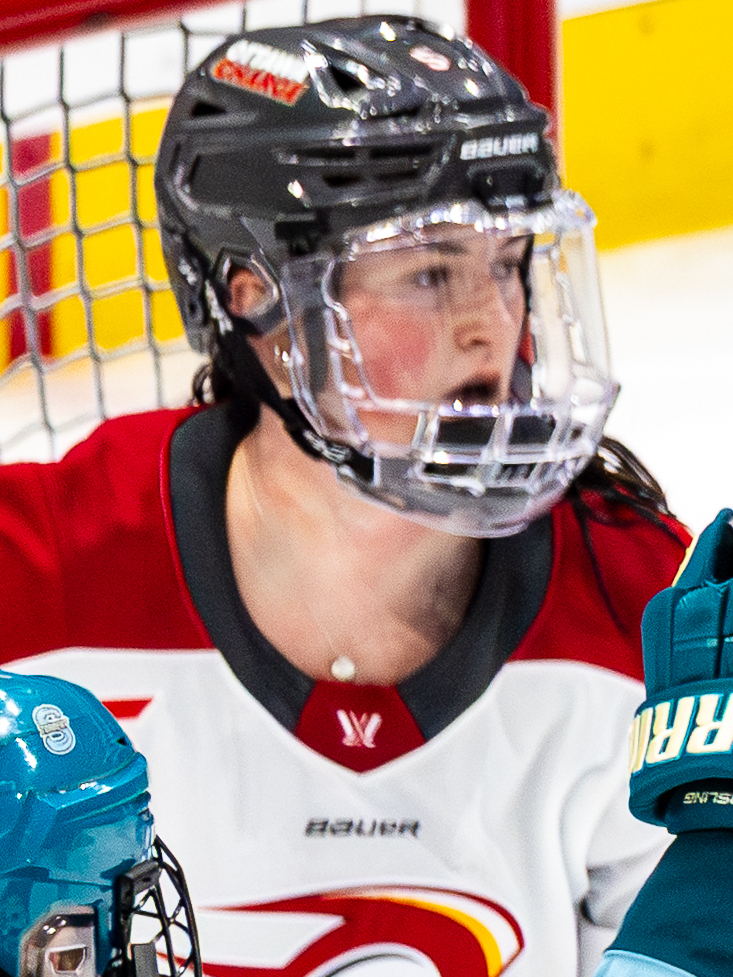
- Guilday with the Ottawa Charge in 2025
- Born: September 7, 2002 (age 24) Chanhassen, Minnesota, US
- Height: 5 ft 11 in (180 cm)
- Weight: 160 lb (73 kg; 11 st 6 lb)
- Position: Defense
- Shoots: Left
- PWHL team Former teams: San Jose Sea Lions; Ottawa Charge
- National team: United States
- Playing career: 2021–present
Medal record
Olympic Games
Gold medal – first place	2026 Milano Cortina	Team
World Championships
Gold medal – first place	2023 Canada
Gold medal – first place	2026 Denmark
Silver medal – second place	2022 Denmark
Silver medal – second place	2024 United States
World U18 Championship
Gold medal – first place	2020 Slovakia

Rory Susanna Guilday (born September 7, 2002) is an American professional ice hockey player who is a defender for the San Jose Sea Lions of the Professional Women's Hockey League (PWHL) and a member of the United States women's national ice hockey team. She played college ice hockey at Cornell and formerly played for Ottawa Charge in the PWHL.

== Early life ==
Born in Chanhassen, Minnesota to Sarah and Landon Guilday, Rory was raised with her two sisters and brother. She began playing hockey at age 5.

In 2016, she was diagnosed with a brain tumor that led to optic nerve glioma and was sidelined from contact sports for nearly a year while undergoing chemotherapy. Despite losing most of her vision in her right eye and having to rebuild her muscle strength and balance, she eventually returned to the ice.

Guilday attended Minnetonka High School in Minnetonka, Minnesota, where she was a two-time captain, and twice earning all-state, all-conference and all-Metro team honors. As a senior in 2021, she recorded eight goals and 11 assists in 23 games. She was subsequently named a top-five finalist for the Minnesota Ms. Hockey Award, and was awarded the Class AA Herb Brooks Award.

== Playing career ==
=== College ===
Guilday began her collegiate career for Cornell during the 2021–22 NCAA season, where she recorded seven goals and 11 assists in 28 games. She made her debut on October 22, 2021, in a game against Mercyhurst and recorded her first collegiate point, an assist in the third period. She scored her first collegiate goal the next day in a 4–0 victory over Mercyhurst. She was subsequently named the ECAC Hockey Rookie of the Week for the week ending October 25, 2021, after she recorded two points and eight blocked shots during the weekend series. She ranked second on the team in blocked shots with 63, and ranked fourth on the team in points. Following the season, she was named to the All-Ivy League second team, ECAC Hockey All-Rookie team, and the USCHO All-Rookie team. She became the first Cornell player to earn a national all-rookie honor since Micah Zandee-Hart in 2016.

=== Professional ===
==== Ottawa Charge (2025–2026) ====
On June 24, 2025, Guilday was drafted fifth overall by the Ottawa Charge in the 2025 PWHL Draft. On July 25, 2025, she signed a three-year contract with the Charge. In her professional debut, Guilday recorded two assists on November 26, 2025, in a 5–1 victory over the Vancouver Goldeneyes, becoming the first Charge defender to record a point that season and the first rookie defender in the PWHL to find the scoresheet. She subsequently recorded assists in three consecutive games, leading all PWHL rookies in scoring with seven points in her first 10 games.

==== San Jose Sea Lions (2026–present) ====
On June 5, 2026, Guilday became the second ever player signed by the San Jose Sea Lions, joining after being left unprotected by the Ottawa Charge during Phase Two of the league's Expansion Roster Distribution Process. She was signed through the 2027–28 season.

== International play ==
=== Junior ===
Guilday represented the United States at the 2020 IIHF World Women's U18 Championship where she recorded one goal in five games and won a gold medal.

=== Senior ===
==== World Championships ====
On August 14, 2022, Guilday was named to the roster for the United States at the 2022 IIHF Women's World Championship. The United States won the silver medal at the tournament. Guilday was part of the United States roster at the 2023 IIHF Women's World Championship in Brampton, Ontario, where the Americans defeated Canada 6–3 in the gold medal game to win their first World Championship since 2019.

Guilday returned to the United States roster for the 2024 IIHF Women's World Championship held in Utica, New York. The United States earned the silver medal after falling to Canada 6–5 in overtime in the gold medal game.

==== Olympics ====
On January 2, 2026, Guilday was named to team USA's roster to compete at the 2026 Winter Olympics.

== Personal life ==
Guilday was diagnosed with a brain tumor in 2016 that led to optic nerve glioma and she was sidelined from any contact sports for a year due to chemotherapy. As a result, she lost the majority of eyesight in her right eye.

== Career statistics ==
=== Regular season and playoffs ===
			Regular season					Playoffs
Season	Team	League	GP	G	A	Pts	PIM	GP	G	A	Pts	PIM
2017–18	Minnetonka	MSHSL	25	2	4	6	6	2	0	0	0	0
2018–19	Minnetonka	MSHSL	25	3	15	18	12	6	0	2	2	0
2019–20	Minnetonka	MSHSL	19	2	16	18	16	6	1	1	2	6
2020–21	Minnetonka	MSHSL	23	8	11	19	16	—	—	—	—	—
2021–22	Cornell University	ECAC	28	7	11	18	16	—	—	—	—	—
2022–23	Cornell University	ECAC	15	1	7	8	4	—	—	—	—	—
2023–24	Cornell University	ECAC	32	6	11	17	18	—	—	—	—	—
2024–25	Cornell University	ECAC	30	5	4	9	22	—	—	—	—	—
2025–26	Ottawa Charge	PWHL	30	1	8	9	18	8	0	2	2	8
NCAA totals			105	19	33	52	60	—	—	—	—	—
PWHL totals			30	1	8	9	18	8	0	2	2	8

=== International ===
Year	Team	Event	Result	GP	G	A	Pts	PIM
2020	United States	U18	1st place, gold medalist(s)	5	1	0	1	0
2022	United States	WC	2nd place, silver medalist(s)	7	1	3	4	2
2023	United States	WC	1st place, gold medalist(s)	7	0	1	1	4
2024	United States	WC	2nd place, silver medalist(s)	7	0	1	1	4
2026	United States	OG	1st place, gold medalist(s)	7	0	0	0	2
Junior totals				5	1	0	1	0
Senior totals				28	1	5	6	12
