= Mira Jungåker =

Swedish ice hockey player (born 2005)

- Born: 22 July 2005 (age 21) Jönköping, Sweden
- Height: 170 cm (5 ft 7 in)
- Weight: 68 kg (150 lb; 10 st 10 lb)
- Position: Defence
- Shoots: Right
- WCHA team Former teams: Ohio State; HV71
- National team: Sweden
- Playing career: 2019–present
Medal record
World Championship
Bronze medal – third place	2026 Denmark

Mira Jungåker (born 22 July 2005) is a Swedish college ice hockey defenceman for Ohio State of the National Collegiate Athletic Association (NCAA) and is a member of Sweden women's national ice hockey team. She previously played for HV71 of the Swedish Women's Hockey League (SDHL).

== Playing career ==
Jungåker began her career with HV71 of the SDHL where she played for five seasons. During the 2021–22 season she recorded six goals and 15 assists and was named the SDHL Rookie of the Year.

On 14 November 2023, she signed her National Letter of Intent to play college ice hockey at Ohio State. During the 2024–25 season, in her freshman year, she recorded five goals and 11 assists in 19 games after missing the majority of the first half of the season due to an injury.

== International play ==
=== Junior ===
Jungåker represented Sweden at the 2022 IIHF U18 Women's World Championship where she recorded one goal and two assists in four games. She again represented Sweden at the 2023 IIHF U18 Women's World Championship where she recorded three goals and two assists in six games and won a silver medal. She was subsequently named the tournament's best defender and to the media all-star team.

=== Senior ===
She made her senior national team debut for Sweden during the 2022 IIHF Women's World Championship where she recorded one goal and four assists in six games. At 17 years old, she was the youngest member on the team.

On 17 March 2023, she was named to Sweden's roster for the 2023 IIHF Women's World Championship. During the tournament, she recorded one goal and three assists in seven games. On 21 March 2024 she was named to Sweden's roster for the 2024 IIHF Women's World Championship and was scoreless in five games. On 25 March 2025, she was again named to Sweden's roster for the 2025 IIHF Women's World Championship. Prior to the 2025 IIHF World Championship she suffered a blood clot. During the tournament she recorded four assists in six games.

On 12 January 2026, she was named to Sweden's roster to compete at the 2026 Winter Olympics. In the bronze medal game versus Switzerland, Jungåker recorded a goal in a 2–1 overtime loss.

She represented Sweden at the 2026 IIHF Women's World Championship where she led the team in scoring with one goal and eight assists in seven games and won a bronze medal. During the bronze medal game against Finland, she recorded 30:15 of ice time in regulation to help Sweden win their first IIHF Women's World Championship medal since 2007. She was subsequently named to the Media All-Star Team.

== Career statistics ==
=== Regular season and playoffs ===
			Regular season					Playoffs
Season	Team	League	GP	G	A	Pts	PIM	GP	G	A	Pts	PIM
2019–20	HV71	SDHL	4	0	0	0	2	—	—	—	—	—
2020–21	HV71	SDHL	35	0	7	7	10	5	0	0	0	2
2021–22	HV71	SDHL	36	6	15	21	20	6	0	2	2	2
2022–23	HV71	SDHL	24	3	6	9	18	2	0	1	1	0
2023–24	HV71	SDHL	34	10	11	21	20	2	1	1	2	0
2024–25	Ohio State University	WCHA	19	5	11	16	10	—	—	—	—	—
2025–26	Ohio State University	WCHA	29	6	19	25	59	—	—	—	—	—
SDHL totals			132	19	39	58	70	15	1	4	5	4

=== International ===
Year	Team	Event	Result	GP	G	A	Pts	PIM
2022	Sweden	U18	4th	4	1	2	3	4
2022	Sweden	WC	7th	6	1	4	5	4
2023	Sweden	U18	2nd place, silver medalist(s)	6	3	2	5	0
2023	Sweden	WC	6th	7	1	3	4	6
2024	Sweden	WC	7th	5	0	0	0	0
2025	Sweden	WC	6th	6	0	4	4	2
2026	Sweden	OG	4th	7	2	0	2	6
2026	Sweden	WC	3rd place, bronze medalist(s)	7	1	8	9	2
Junior totals				10	4	4	8	4
Senior totals				38	5	19	24	22
