= Granly Hockey Arena =

Ice hockey arena in Esbjerg, Denmark

Coordinates: 55°28′57″N 8°26′16″E

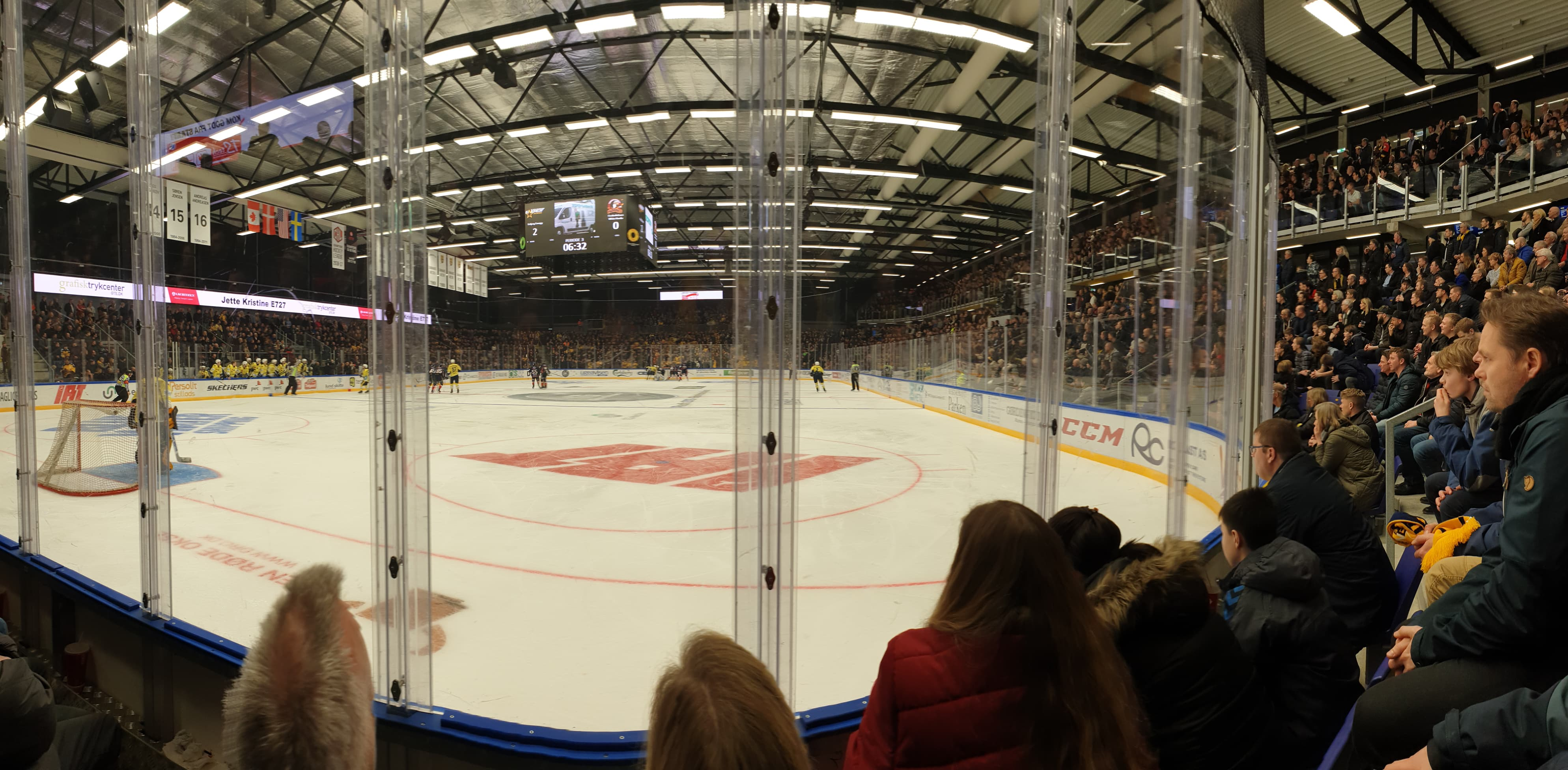
Granly Hockey Arena

Granly Hockey Arena (also known as Esbjerg Skøjtehal) is an ice hockey arena located in Esbjerg, Denmark. The arena opened in 1974 and has a capacity of 4,200 people. Its primary tenant is Esbjerg IK. The arena has been home to the ice hockey club Esbjerg Elite Ishockey since 2005.

The rink has also hosted international curling matches, most notably the 2011 World Women's Curling Championship and the 2015 European Curling Championships (both men and women).

== See also ==
- List of indoor arenas in Denmark
- List of indoor arenas in Nordic countries
