= Nicola Hadraschek-Eisenschmid =

German ice hockey player (born 1996)

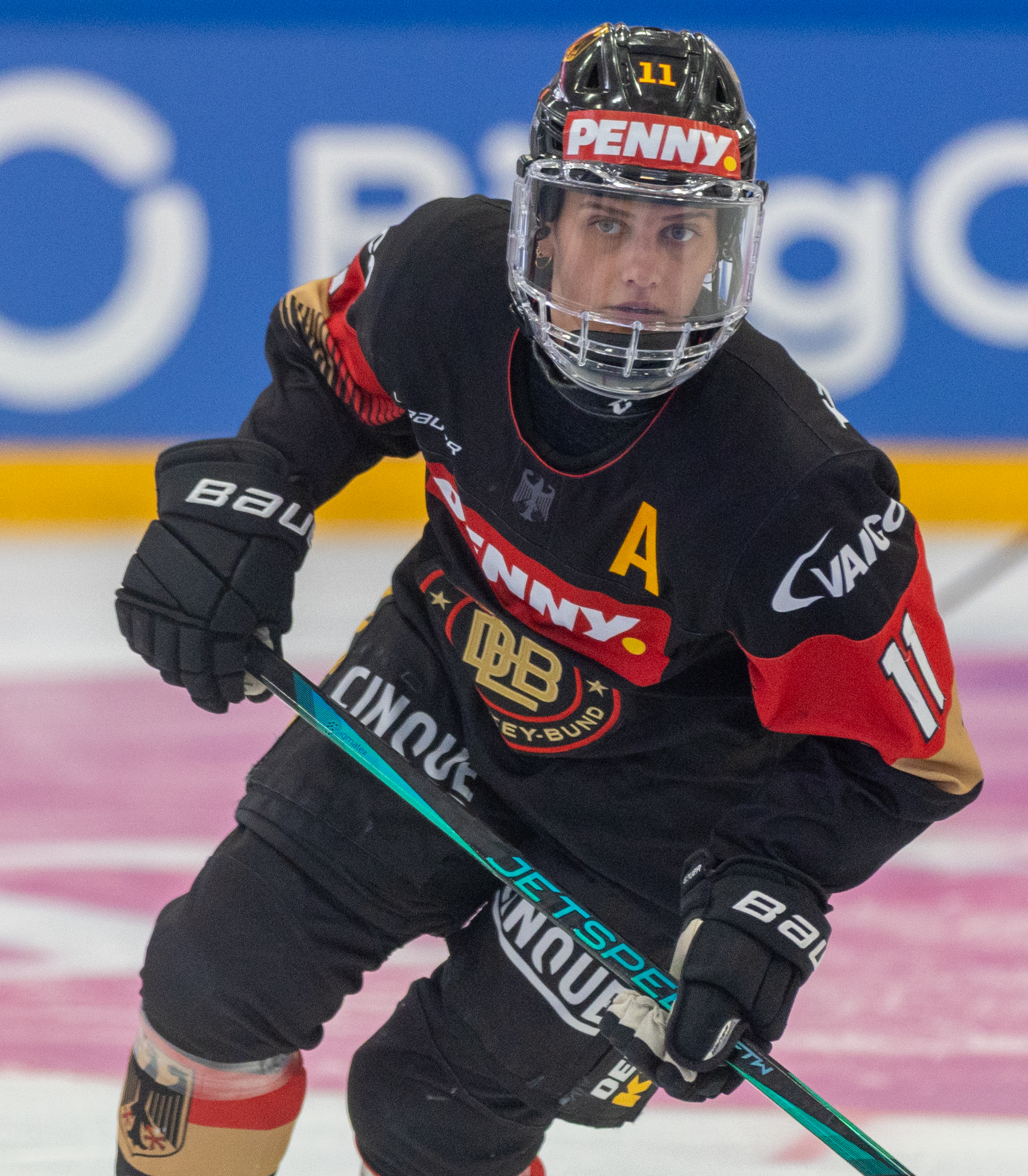
- Hadraschek-Eisenschmid in 2026
- Born: 10 September 1996 (age 29) Marktoberdorf, Germany
- Height: 1.67 m (5 ft 6 in)
- Weight: 66 kg (146 lb; 10 st 6 lb)
- Position: Right wing
- Shoots: Left
- DFEL team Former teams: ECDC Memmingen; Djurgårdens IF; ERC Ingolstadt
- National team: Germany
- Playing career: 2012–present

Nicola Hadraschek-Eisenschmid née Eisenschmid (born 10 September 1996) is a German ice hockey player and member of the German national team. She plays in the German Women's Ice Hockey League (DFEL) with ECDC Memmingen.

== International play ==
Hadraschek-Eisenschmid represented Germany at the IIHF Women's World Championships in 2015, 2017, 2019, 2021, 2022, 2023, and 2024.

== Personal life ==
Her older brother, Markus Eisenschmid, and older sister, Tanja Eisenschmid, are also German national ice hockey team players.

She and German ice hockey player Maximilian Hadraschek were married in July 2024.
