= Tanja Eisenschmid =

German ice hockey player

- Born: 20 April 1993 (age 33) Kaufbeuren, Germany
- Height: 174 cm (5 ft 9 in)
- Weight: 65 kg (143 lb; 10 st 3 lb)
- Position: Defence
- Shoots: Left
- SDHL team Former teams: Djurgårdens IF: ERC Ingolstadt; Minnesota Whitecaps; North Dakota Fighting Hawks; ECDC Memmingen; ESC Planegg
- National team: Germany
- Playing career: 2010–present

Tanja Eisenschmid (born 20 April 1993) is a German ice hockey player and member of the German national team, currently playing in the Swedish Women's Hockey League (SDHL) with Djurgårdens IF Hockey Dam.

She attended the University of North Dakota and played four years of college ice hockey with the North Dakota Fighting Hawks women's ice hockey program during 2012 to 2016. Afterwards, she joined the independent Minnesota Whitecaps beginning in the 2016–17 season. She remained with the Whitecaps when the team joined the professional National Women's Hockey League (NWHL) in the 2018–19 season. She was also a marketing intern for the University of North Dakota's television show, Studio One.

Eisenschmid represented Germany in the women's ice hockey tournament at the 2014 Winter Olympics and at the IIHF Women's World Championships in 2012, 2013, 2015, 2017, 2021, and 2022.

Her younger brother, Markus Eisenschmid, and younger sister, Nicola Eisenschmid, are also German national team ice hockey players.
