= Markus Eisenschmid =

German ice hockey player

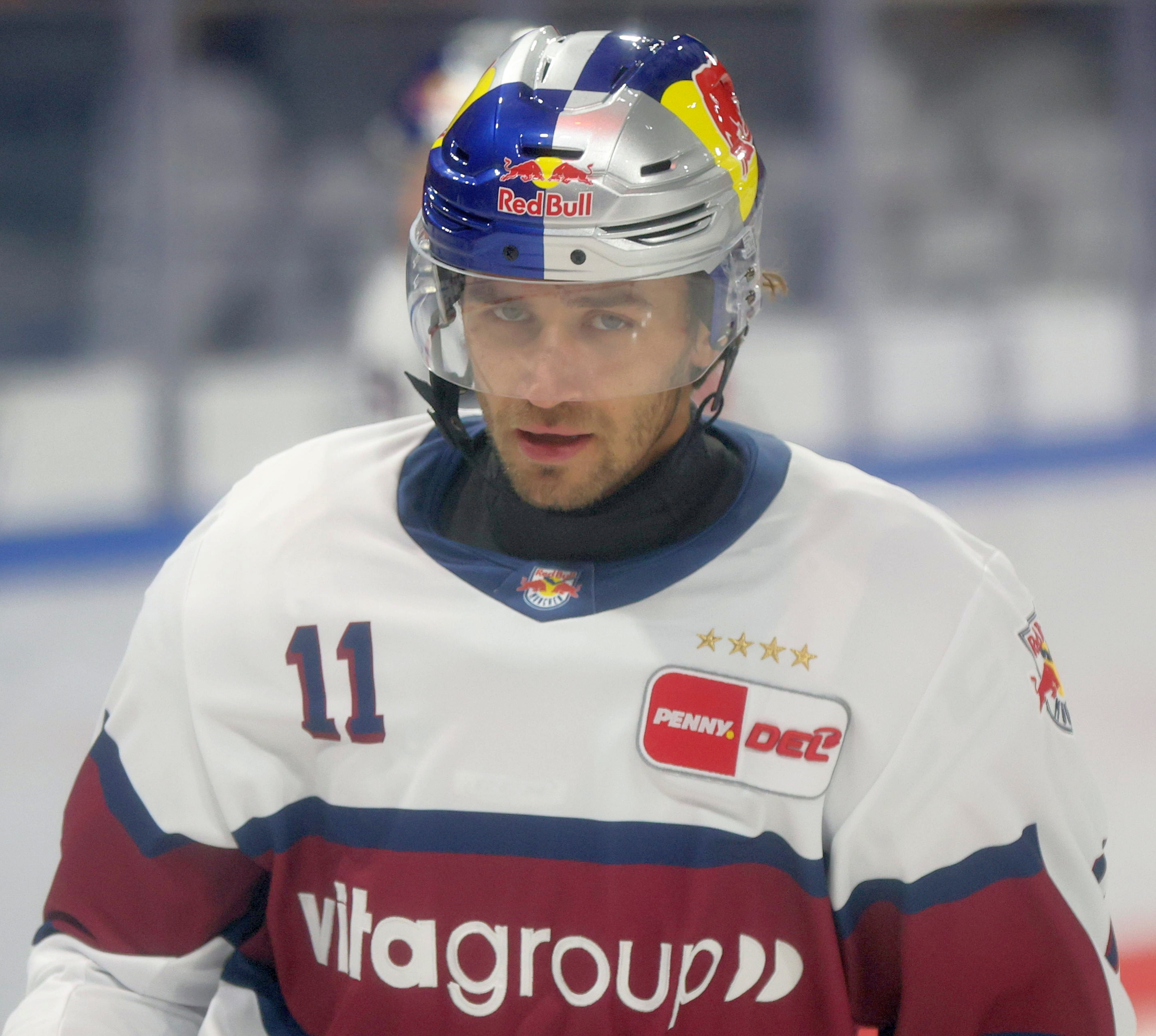
- Born: 22 January 1995 (age 31) Marktoberdorf, Germany
- Height: 6 ft 1 in (185 cm)
- Weight: 194 lb (88 kg; 13 st 12 lb)
- Position: Forward
- Shoots: Right
- DEL team Former teams: EHC München; Adler Mannheim
- National team: Germany
- NHL draft: Undrafted
- Playing career: 2013–present

Markus Eisenschmid (born 22 January 1995) is a German professional ice hockey player for EHC Red Bull München of the Deutsche Eishockey Liga (DEL). He has previously played for the St. John's IceCaps and Laval Rocket of the American Hockey League (AHL).

== Playing career ==
During his youth, Eisenschmid played for the youth team of the ESV Kaufbeuren. For the 2011–12 and 2012–13 seasons, he played in the Deutsche Nachwuchsliga (DNL). At the same time, he was named to the junior team of the national team. In the 2012–13 season, Eisenschmid completed his first game for the first team in the former 2nd Bundesliga. In April 2013, Eisenschmid was signed by the Hamburg Freezers, but he never played for them.

Before the 2013–14 season, North America scouts became aware of Eisenschmid. He was selected by the Medicine Hat Tigers of the Western Hockey League (WHL) in the CHL Import Draft in the first round in 28th overall. Due to a clause in his contract, he was able to switch to the Tigers, whom he played with for two seasons. After two successful seasons in the Canadian Hockey League (CHL), he was invited to the Montreal Canadiens summer training camp due to his good performance. He was then offered an AHL contract with the St. John's IceCaps, for whom he was active from October 2015. In January 2017, the Canadiens signed him to a two-year contract, after which he played the 2017–18 season for their new farm team, the Laval Rocket.

In June 2018, he signed a contract with the Adler Mannheim of the Deutsche Eishockey Liga (DEL), returning to his homeland.

Following five seasons with Adler Mannheim, Eisenschmid continued his career in the DEL, signing a one-year contract with EHC Red Bull München on 4 May 2023.

== International play ==
Eisenschmid has represented Germany since his first nomination to the U16 national team of the DEB-Pokal. He also took part in the World Junior Championships for Germany. Eisenschmid debuted for the German senior national team at the end of April 2018 for the 2018 Euro Hockey Challenge and then took part in the 2018 World Championship in Denmark.

== Personal life ==
Eisenschmid has two sisters who also play hockey. His older sister, Tanja, and his younger sister, Nicola, played for the German women's national team. His older brother, Michael, plays ball hockey.

== Career statistics ==
=== Regular season and playoffs ===
			Regular season					Playoffs
Season	Team	League	GP	G	A	Pts	PIM	GP	G	A	Pts	PIM
2011–12	ESV Kaufbeuren	DNL	35	18	23	41	54	3	1	3	4	14
2012–13	ESV Kaufbeuren	DNL	19	11	7	18	34	4	3	3	6	8
2012–13	ESV Kaufbeuren	2.GBun	39	2	5	7	4	—	—	—	—	—
2013–14	Medicine Hat Tigers	WHL	56	7	16	23	20	18	0	5	5	0
2014–15	Medicine Hat Tigers	WHL	50	19	25	44	14	10	2	3	5	8
2015–16	St. John's IceCaps	AHL	28	1	4	5	0	—	—	—	—	—
2016–17	St. John's IceCaps	AHL	39	6	4	10	12	—	—	—	—	—
2017–18	Laval Rocket	AHL	57	6	10	16	29	—	—	—	—	—
2018–19	Adler Mannheim	DEL	50	20	22	42	30	14	8	4	12	14
2019–20	Adler Mannheim	DEL	18	6	9	15	18	—	—	—	—	—
2020–21	Adler Mannheim	DEL	38	14	16	30	20	6	0	4	4	4
2021–22	Adler Mannheim	DEL	47	11	13	24	28	8	1	2	3	0
2022–23	Adler Mannheim	DEL	56	17	12	29	26	12	1	4	5	10
2023–24	EHC München	DEL	42	11	4	15	10	9	1	2	3	6
2024–25	EHC München	DEL	51	13	10	23	20	6	3	1	4	10
2025–26	EHC München	DEL	38	14	10	24	28	11	3	1	4	12
AHL totals			124	13	18	31	41	—	—	—	—	—
DEL totals			340	106	96	202	180	66	17	18	35	56

=== International ===
Year	Team	Event	Result	GP	G	A	Pts	PIM
2012	Germany	U17	9th	5	0	4	4	2
2012	Germany	U18	6th	6	1	1	2	0
2013	Germany	U18	8th	5	0	1	1	27
2014	Germany	WJC	9th	7	1	0	1	4
2015	Germany	WJC	10th	6	0	0	0	6
2018	Germany	WC	11th	7	1	1	2	0
2019	Germany	WC	6th	8	1	6	7	2
2021	Germany	WC	4th	10	1	3	4	10
Junior totals				29	2	6	8	39
Senior totals				25	3	10	13	12

== Awards and honours ==
Award	Year
DEL
Champion (Adler Mannheim)	2019
