= Shauna Neary =

Canadian ice hockey referee

- Education: Mount Allison University
- Occupations: Ice hockey referee, hockey coach
- Known for: Officiating at the 2026 Winter Olympics
- Awards: Hockey Canada Officiating Program Branch Award: Most Deserving (2021); Hal Lewis Award (2022)

Shauna Neary is a Canadian ice hockey referee from Antigonish, Nova Scotia, who has officiated in Canadian university and national-level competition, International Ice Hockey Federation (IIHF) events, and professional leagues including the Professional Women's Hockey League (PWHL). She was selected by the IIHF as one of the Canadian referees for women’s hockey at the 2026 Winter Olympics in Italy.

== Personal life ==
Neary has been described by Hockey Nova Scotia and local media as being from Antigonish, Nova Scotia. Hockey Canada lists her as being from Herring Cove, Nova Scotia, in its official announcements and IIHF licensing lists, and Sport Nova Scotia also lists her as being from Herring Cove in its Support4Sport awards materials.

Neary graduated from Mount Allison University in 2008 and played as a goaltender for the Mount Allison Mounties women's hockey program. She married Jess Healy on August 23, 2014, whom she met while coaching at a hockey camp in 2005. In 2026, media coverage of her Olympic assignment identified her as the mother of a son named Charlie.

== Officiating career ==
Neary has officiated in U Sports women’s hockey and served in leadership and development roles in Nova Scotia, including as referee-in-chief for the Metro West Force Female Hockey Association. She has also been involved with the Hockey Nova Scotia High Performance Program and worked as an assistant coach with the Dalhousie Tigers women’s hockey team.

=== International assignments ===
Neary officiated at the 2019 IIHF Women's World Championship Division III tournament in Sofia, Bulgaria, in 2019. She later worked the 2021 IIHF Women's World Championship in Calgary, Alberta. In 2024–25, she was among Canadian officials licensed by the IIHF for international competition.

Neary was assigned to games in the Rivalry Series in 2021. In February 2025, she officiated at the Group I women’s final Olympic qualification tournament in Germany.

=== Professional leagues ===
Neary has officiated in the PWHL, wearing uniform number 49. She was also listed on the PWHL’s officiating roster for the 2025–26 season.

=== 2026 Winter Olympics ===
Neary was selected by the IIHF as one of the Canadian referees for women’s hockey at the 2026 Winter Olympics in Italy. During the tournament, she was assigned to officiate games in the women’s Olympic hockey competition, including a preliminary round matchup between Sweden and Germany on February 5, 2026. She was also reported to be among the referees working the women’s Olympic tournament in Milan and Cortina d’Ampezzo.

== Awards and honours ==
- 2021 Hockey Canada Officiating Program Branch Award: Most Deserving (Hockey Nova Scotia)
- 2022 Hal Lewis Award (Hockey Nova Scotia Official of the Year)
