= Scanel Hockey Arena =

Ice hockey venue in Frederikshavn, Denmark

Coordinates: 57.4170°N 10.5208°E

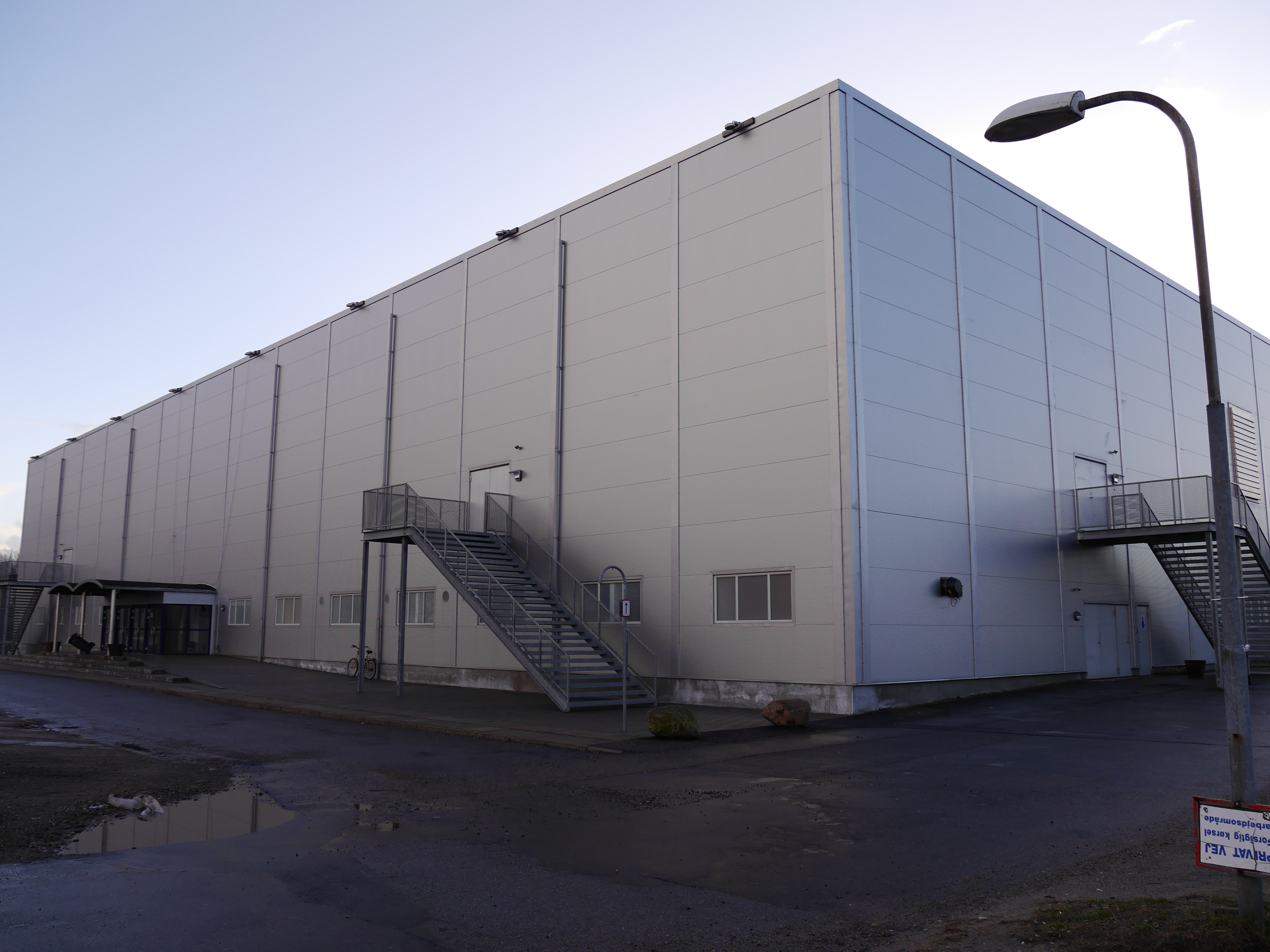
- Location: Skøjtealléen 4; 9900 Frederikshavn
- Capacity: 4000 (seats: 750)

Construction
- Built: 1970
- Renovated: 2014
- Construction cost: Renovation cost: 39 million DKK $5.9 million

Tenants
- Frederikshavn Whitehawks (2014 - present)

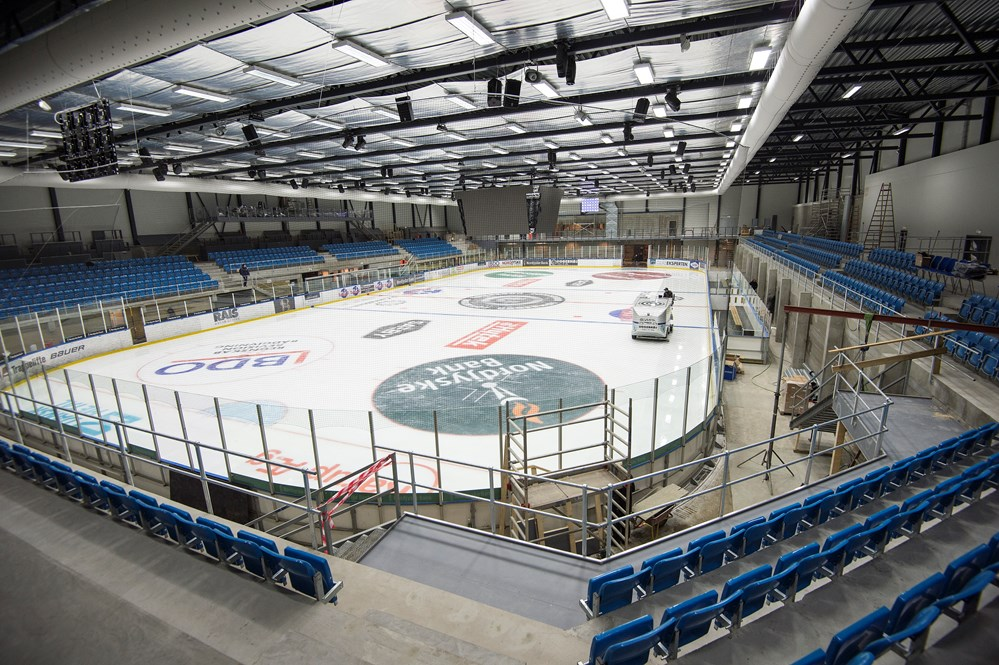
Scanel Hockey Arena

Scanel Hockey Arena (also known as Iscenter Nord) is an arena in Frederikshavn, Denmark. It is used by Frederikshavn White Hawks. The old ice rink from 1970 was demolished and in 2014 the Scanel Hockey Arena was built. It has a capacity of 4000 with 750 seats.
