= KVIK Hockey Arena =

Indoor ice hockey venue in Herning, Denmark

Coordinates: 56.1576°N 8.9668°E

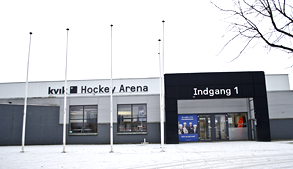
- Interactive map of KVIK Hockey Arena
- Location: Holingknuden 1; 7400 Herning
- Capacity: 4,120 (seats: 420)

Construction
- Built: 1987

Tenant
- Herning Bluefox (1988–present)

KVIK Hockey Arena is a hockey arena in Herning, Denmark. It is used by Herning Blue Fox. The complex consists of two rinks, KVIK Hockey Arena that has a capacity of 4,120, where 420 of them are seats, and the new training arena that has a capacity of 200.

== Renovation ==
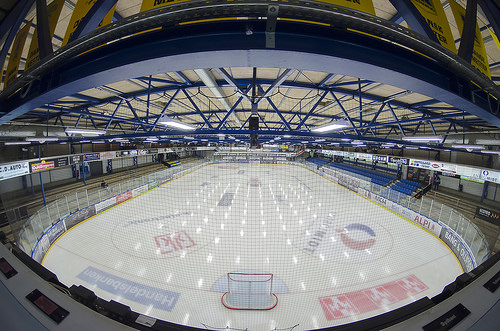
Inside KVIK Hockey Arena

It was decided in June 2016 that the 30 year old arena wasn't good enough as a training facility for the 2018 IIHF World Championship which is set in Herning and Copenhagen, Denmark. The arena will be fully rebuilt and renovated for 61 million DKK for the championship.

== See also ==
- List of indoor arenas in Denmark
- List of indoor arenas in Nordic countries
