= 2023 IIHF Women's World Championship rosters =

Each team's roster consisted of at least 15 skaters (forwards, and defencemen) and two goaltenders, and at most 20 skaters and three goaltenders. All ten participating nations, through the confirmation of their respective national associations, had to submit a roster by the first IIHF directorate.

Ages are as of 5 April 2023, the first day of the tournament.

== Group A ==
=== Canada ===
The roster was announced on 9 March 2023.

Head coach: Troy Ryan

No.	Pos.	Name	Height	Weight	Birthdate	Team
3	D	Jocelyne Larocque	1.68 m (5 ft 6 in)	66 kg (146 lb)	19 May 1988 (aged 34)	(Canada) PWHPA Toronto
6	F	Rebecca Johnston	1.75 m (5 ft 9 in)	68 kg (150 lb)	24 September 1989 (aged 33)	(Canada) PWHPA Calgary
7	F	Laura Stacey	1.78 m (5 ft 10 in)	71 kg (157 lb)	5 May 1994 (aged 28)	(Canada) PWHPA Montreal
10	F	Sarah Fillier	1.65 m (5 ft 5 in)	65 kg (143 lb)	9 June 2000 (aged 22)	(United States) Princeton Tigers
14	D	Renata Fast – A	1.68 m (5 ft 6 in)	65 kg (143 lb)	6 October 1994 (aged 28)	(Canada) PWHPA Toronto
17	D	Ella Shelton	1.73 m (5 ft 8 in)	80 kg (180 lb)	19 January 1998 (aged 25)	(Canada) PWHPA Toronto
19	F	Brianne Jenner	1.75 m (5 ft 9 in)	71 kg (157 lb)	4 May 1991 (aged 31)	(Canada) PWHPA Toronto
20	F	Sarah Nurse	1.75 m (5 ft 9 in)	67 kg (148 lb)	4 January 1995 (aged 28)	(Canada) PWHPA Toronto
23	D	Erin Ambrose	1.65 m (5 ft 5 in)	64 kg (141 lb)	30 April 1994 (aged 28)	(Canada) PWHPA Montreal
24	F	Natalie Spooner	1.78 m (5 ft 10 in)	77 kg (170 lb)	17 October 1990 (aged 32)	(Canada) PWHPA Toronto
25	D	Jaime Bourbonnais	1.70 m (5 ft 7 in)	57 kg (126 lb)	9 September 1999 (aged 23)	(Canada) PWHPA Montreal
26	F	Emily Clark	1.70 m (5 ft 7 in)	70 kg (150 lb)	28 November 1995 (aged 27)	(Canada) PWHPA Montreal
27	F	Emma Maltais	1.60 m (5 ft 3 in)	66 kg (146 lb)	4 November 1999 (aged 23)	(United States) Ohio State Buckeyes
28	D	Micah Zandee-Hart	1.73 m (5 ft 8 in)	68 kg (150 lb)	13 January 1997 (aged 26)	(Canada) PWHPA Calgary
29	F	Marie-Philip Poulin – C	1.70 m (5 ft 7 in)	73 kg (161 lb)	28 March 1991 (aged 32)	(Canada) PWHPA Montreal
35	G	Ann-Renée Desbiens	1.75 m (5 ft 9 in)	73 kg (161 lb)	10 April 1994 (aged 28)	(Canada) PWHPA Montreal
38	G	Emerance Maschmeyer	1.68 m (5 ft 6 in)	64 kg (141 lb)	5 October 1994 (aged 28)	(Canada) PWHPA Montreal
40	F	Blayre Turnbull – A	1.70 m (5 ft 7 in)	68 kg (150 lb)	15 July 1993 (aged 29)	(Canada) PWHPA Calgary
42	D	Claire Thompson	1.73 m (5 ft 8 in)	67 kg (148 lb)	28 January 1998 (aged 25)	(Canada) PWHPA Toronto
43	F	Kristin O'Neill	1.63 m (5 ft 4 in)	57 kg (126 lb)	30 March 1998 (aged 25)	(Canada) PWHPA Toronto
47	F	Jamie Lee Rattray	1.70 m (5 ft 7 in)	70 kg (150 lb)	30 September 1992 (aged 30)	(Canada) PWHPA Toronto
50	G	Kristen Campbell	1.78 m (5 ft 10 in)	82 kg (181 lb)	30 November 1997 (aged 25)	(Canada) PWHPA Calgary
92	F	Danielle Serdachny	1.74 m (5 ft 9 in)	72 kg (159 lb)	12 May 2001 (aged 21)	(United States) Colgate Raiders

=== Czechia ===
The roster was announced on 20 March 2023.

Head coach: (Canada) Carla MacLeod

No.	Pos.	Name	Height	Weight	Birthdate	Team
1	G	Michaela Hesová	1.69 m (5 ft 7 in)	60 kg (130 lb)	2 November 2005 (aged 17)	(United States) Bishop Kearney Selects
2	D	Aneta Tejralová – A	1.64 m (5 ft 5 in)	53 kg (117 lb)	4 January 1996 (aged 27)	(United States) Boston Pride
3	F	Adéla Šapovalivová	1.62 m (5 ft 4 in)	54 kg (119 lb)	17 May 2006 (aged 16)	(Czech Republic) HC Berounští Medvědi U15
4	D	Daniela Pejšová	1.75 m (5 ft 9 in)	70 kg (150 lb)	14 August 2002 (aged 20)	(Sweden) Luleå HF
8	F	Tereza Pištěková	1.71 m (5 ft 7 in)	60 kg (130 lb)	3 June 2005 (aged 17)	(Finland) TPS
9	F	Alena Mills – C	1.73 m (5 ft 8 in)	82 kg (181 lb)	9 June 1990 (aged 32)	(Sweden) Brynäs IF
10	F	Denisa Křížová	1.65 m (5 ft 5 in)	64 kg (141 lb)	3 November 1994 (aged 28)	(United States) Minnesota Whitecaps
12	F	Klára Hymlarová	1.63 m (5 ft 4 in)	67 kg (148 lb)	27 February 1999 (aged 24)	(United States) St. Cloud State Huskies
13	D	Klára Jandušíková	1.65 m (5 ft 5 in)	62 kg (137 lb)	29 December 2001 (aged 21)	(United States) Colby Mules
14	D	Dominika Lásková	1.67 m (5 ft 6 in)	70 kg (150 lb)	20 December 1996 (aged 26)	(Canada) Toronto Six
15	D	Andrea Trnková	1.76 m (5 ft 9 in)	74 kg (163 lb)	3 March 2004 (aged 19)	(Czech Republic) HC Choceň
16	F	Kateřina Mrázová – A	1.63 m (5 ft 4 in)	63 kg (139 lb)	19 October 1992 (aged 30)	(United States) Connecticut Whale
17	D	Karolína Kosinová	1.71 m (5 ft 7 in)	73 kg (161 lb)	21 May 1998 (aged 24)	(Czech Republic) HC Berounští Medvědi
18	F	Michaela Pejzlová	1.69 m (5 ft 7 in)	62 kg (137 lb)	4 June 1997 (aged 25)	(Finland) HIFK
19	F	Natálie Mlýnková	1.61 m (5 ft 3 in)	61 kg (134 lb)	24 May 2001 (aged 21)	(United States) Vermont Catamounts
21	F	Tereza Vanišová	1.69 m (5 ft 7 in)	65 kg (143 lb)	30 January 1996 (aged 27)	(Canada) Toronto Six
22	F	Tereza Plosová	1.75 m (5 ft 9 in)	65 kg (143 lb)	5 July 2006 (aged 16)	(Czech Republic) HC Vlci Jablonec nad Nisou
24	D	Sára Čajanová	1.70 m (5 ft 7 in)	63 kg (139 lb)	10 December 2002 (aged 20)	(Sweden) Brynäs IF
25	F	Kristýna Pátková	1.67 m (5 ft 6 in)	70 kg (150 lb)	17 June 1998 (aged 24)	(United States) Vermont Catamounts
26	F	Vendula Přibylová	1.71 m (5 ft 7 in)	82 kg (181 lb)	23 March 1996 (aged 27)	(Sweden) MoDo
28	F	Noemi Neubauerová	1.73 m (5 ft 8 in)	69 kg (152 lb)	15 December 1999 (aged 23)	(United States) Providence Friars
30	G	Kateřina Zechovská	1.65 m (5 ft 5 in)	76 kg (168 lb)	4 November 1998 (aged 24)	(Czech Republic) HC Draci Bílina
31	G	Blanka Škodová	1.77 m (5 ft 10 in)	68 kg (150 lb)	1 October 1997 (aged 25)	(United States) Minnesota Duluth Bulldogs

=== Japan ===
The roster was announced on 24 March 2023.

Head coach: Yuji Iizuka

No.	Pos.	Name	Height	Weight	Birthdate	Team
2	D	Shiori Koike – C	1.59 m (5 ft 3 in)	53 kg (117 lb)	21 March 1993 (aged 30)	(Japan) DK Peregrine
3	D	Aoi Shiga	1.65 m (5 ft 5 in)	63 kg (139 lb)	4 July 1999 (aged 23)	(Japan) Toyota Cygnus
4	D	Ayaka Hitosato – A	1.61 m (5 ft 3 in)	58 kg (128 lb)	22 August 1994 (aged 28)	(Sweden) Linköping HC
5	D	Shiori Yamashita	1.58 m (5 ft 2 in)	52 kg (115 lb)	28 April 2002 (aged 20)	(Japan) Seibu Princess Rabbits
6	D	Kohane Sato	1.63 m (5 ft 4 in)	60 kg (130 lb)	16 March 2006 (aged 17)	(Japan) Daishin
7	D	Kanami Seki	1.68 m (5 ft 6 in)	70 kg (150 lb)	23 June 2000 (aged 22)	(Japan) Seibu Princess Rabbits
8	D	Akane Hosoyamada – A	1.63 m (5 ft 4 in)	59 kg (130 lb)	9 March 1992 (aged 31)	(Japan) DK Peregrine
10	F	Hikaru Yamashita	1.58 m (5 ft 2 in)	54 kg (119 lb)	23 September 2000 (aged 22)	(Japan) Seibu Princess Rabbits
11	F	Akane Shiga	1.65 m (5 ft 5 in)	61 kg (134 lb)	3 March 2001 (aged 22)	(Japan) Toyota Cygnus
13	F	Chisato Miyazaki	1.51 m (4 ft 11 in)	51 kg (112 lb)	8 August 1997 (aged 25)	(Japan) Seibu Princess Rabbits
14	F	Haruka Toko	1.67 m (5 ft 6 in)	65 kg (143 lb)	16 March 1997 (aged 26)	(Sweden) Linköping HC
15	F	Rui Ukita	1.70 m (5 ft 7 in)	72 kg (159 lb)	6 June 1996 (aged 26)	(Japan) Daishin
16	F	Yoshino Enomoto	1.62 m (5 ft 4 in)	57 kg (126 lb)	22 September 1998 (aged 24)	(Japan) Seibu Princess Rabbits
19	F	Makoto Ito	1.67 m (5 ft 6 in)	67 kg (148 lb)	2 May 2004 (aged 18)	(Japan) Daishin
20	G	Miyuu Masuhara	1.57 m (5 ft 2 in)	50 kg (110 lb)	4 October 2001 (aged 21)	(Japan) DK Peregrine
23	F	Chihiro Suzuki	1.57 m (5 ft 2 in)	62 kg (137 lb)	4 May 2002 (aged 20)	(Canada) Guelph Gryphons
24	F	Mei Miura	1.62 m (5 ft 4 in)	63 kg (139 lb)	16 November 1998 (aged 24)	(Japan) Toyota Cygnus
27	F	Remi Koyama	1.47 m (4 ft 10 in)	52 kg (115 lb)	17 July 2000 (aged 22)	(Japan) Seibu Princess Rabbits
30	G	Kiku Kobayashi	1.67 m (5 ft 6 in)	59 kg (130 lb)	7 July 2002 (aged 20)	(Japan) Seibu Princess Rabbits
31	G	Riko Kawaguchi	1.65 m (5 ft 5 in)	70 kg (150 lb)	19 September 2004 (aged 18)	(Japan) Daishin
40	F	Rio Noro	1.65 m (5 ft 5 in)	62 kg (137 lb)	15 May 2004 (aged 18)	(Japan) Daishin
41	F	Riri Noro	1.62 m (5 ft 4 in)	55 kg (121 lb)	15 May 2004 (aged 18)	(Japan) Daishin
61	F	Yumeka Wajima	1.56 m (5 ft 1 in)	48 kg (106 lb)	19 October 2002 (aged 20)	(Japan) DK Peregrine

=== Switzerland ===
The roster was announced on 28 February 2023. On 21 March, Noemi Ryhner withdrew because of an injury and was replaced with Alena Lynn Rossel.

Head coach: Colin Muller

No.	Pos.	Name	Height	Weight	Birthdate	Team
3	D	Sarah Forster – A	1.70 m (5 ft 7 in)	65 kg (143 lb)	19 May 1993 (aged 29)	(United States) Metropolitan Riveters
4	D	Nadine Hofstetter	1.65 m (5 ft 5 in)	65 kg (143 lb)	21 October 1994 (aged 28)	(Switzerland) SC Langenthal
7	F	Lara Stalder – C	1.67 m (5 ft 6 in)	63 kg (139 lb)	15 May 1994 (aged 28)	(Sweden) Brynäs IF
8	F	Kaleigh Quennec	1.72 m (5 ft 8 in)	79 kg (174 lb)	15 February 1998 (aged 25)	(Canada) Montreal Carabins
9	D	Shannon Sigrist	1.67 m (5 ft 6 in)	68 kg (150 lb)	20 April 1999 (aged 23)	(Switzerland) HC Thurgau Ladies
10	D	Janine Hauser	1.70 m (5 ft 7 in)	73 kg (161 lb)	6 May 2001 (aged 21)	(Switzerland) GCK/ZSC Lions
11	F	Laura Zimmermann	1.63 m (5 ft 4 in)	73 kg (161 lb)	5 April 2003 (aged 20)	(United States) St. Cloud State Huskies
12	F	Lisa Rüedi	1.67 m (5 ft 6 in)	67 kg (148 lb)	3 November 2000 (aged 22)	(Switzerland) GCK/ZSC Lions
16	D	Nicole Vallario	1.66 m (5 ft 5 in)	71 kg (157 lb)	30 August 2001 (aged 21)	(United States) St. Thomas Tommies
17	D	Lara Christen	1.63 m (5 ft 4 in)	64 kg (141 lb)	2 October 2002 (aged 20)	(Switzerland) SC Langenthal
18	D	Stefanie Wetli	1.73 m (5 ft 8 in)	71 kg (157 lb)	4 February 2000 (aged 23)	(Switzerland) HC Thurgau Ladies
19	F	Emma Ingold	1.71 m (5 ft 7 in)	62 kg (137 lb)	12 August 2002 (aged 20)	(Switzerland) SC Langenthal
20	G	Andrea Brändli	1.69 m (5 ft 7 in)	75 kg (165 lb)	5 June 1997 (aged 25)	(United States) Boston University Terriers
21	F	Rahel Enzler	1.63 m (5 ft 4 in)	66 kg (146 lb)	30 July 2000 (aged 22)	(United States) Maine Black Bears
22	F	Sinja Leemann	1.68 m (5 ft 6 in)	62 kg (137 lb)	19 April 2002 (aged 20)	(Switzerland) GCK/ZSC Lions
25	F	Alina Müller – A	1.67 m (5 ft 6 in)	63 kg (139 lb)	12 March 1998 (aged 25)	(United States) Northeastern Huskies
28	F	Alina Marti	1.67 m (5 ft 6 in)	67 kg (148 lb)	23 April 2004 (aged 18)	(Switzerland) GCK/ZSC Lions
29	G	Saskia Maurer	1.66 m (5 ft 5 in)	58 kg (128 lb)	29 July 2001 (aged 21)	(United States) St. Thomas Tommies
39	G	Caroline Spies	1.69 m (5 ft 7 in)	62 kg (137 lb)	2 July 2002 (aged 20)	(Switzerland) SC Langenthal
71	F	Lena Marie Lutz	1.67 m (5 ft 6 in)	71 kg (157 lb)	12 July 2001 (aged 21)	(Switzerland) HC Ladies Lugano
82	D	Alessia Baechler	1.74 m (5 ft 9 in)	68 kg (150 lb)	7 September 2005 (aged 17)	(Switzerland) GCK/ZSC Lions
87	F	Cindy Joray	1.66 m (5 ft 5 in)	59 kg (130 lb)	8 June 1993 (aged 29)	(Switzerland) EV Bomo Thun
94	F	Alena Rossel	1.69 m (5 ft 7 in)	58 kg (128 lb)	8 June 2006 (aged 16)	(Switzerland) EV Bomo Thun

=== United States ===
The roster was announced on 1 April 2023.

Head coach: John Wroblewski

No.	Pos.	Name	Height	Weight	Birthdate	Team
2	D	Lee Stecklein – A	1.83 m (6 ft 0 in)	77 kg (170 lb)	23 April 1994 (aged 28)	(United States) PWHPA Harvey's
3	D	Cayla Barnes	1.57 m (5 ft 2 in)	63 kg (139 lb)	7 January 1999 (aged 24)	(United States) Boston College
4	D	Caroline Harvey	1.70 m (5 ft 7 in)	66 kg (146 lb)	14 October 2002 (aged 20)	(United States) Wisconsin Badgers
5	D	Megan Keller	1.80 m (5 ft 11 in)	75 kg (165 lb)	1 May 1996 (aged 26)	(United States) PWHPA Scotiabank
6	D	Rory Guilday	1.78 m (5 ft 10 in)	73 kg (161 lb)	7 September 2002 (aged 20)	(United States) Cornell Big Red
7	F	Lacey Eden	1.73 m (5 ft 8 in)	68 kg (150 lb)	2 May 2002 (aged 20)	(United States) Wisconsin Badgers
8	D	Haley Winn	1.65 m (5 ft 5 in)	68 kg (150 lb)	14 July 2003 (aged 19)	(United States) Clarkson University
10	F	Becca Gilmore	1.68 m (5 ft 6 in)	70 kg (150 lb)	15 February 1998 (aged 25)	(United States) Boston Pride
11	F	Abby Roque	1.70 m (5 ft 7 in)	82 kg (181 lb)	25 September 1997 (aged 25)	(United States) PWHPA Sonnet
12	F	Kelly Pannek	1.73 m (5 ft 8 in)	75 kg (165 lb)	29 December 1995 (aged 27)	(United States) PWHPA Scotiabank
15	D	Savannah Harmon	1.60 m (5 ft 3 in)	67 kg (148 lb)	27 October 1995 (aged 27)	(United States) PWHPA Harvey's
16	F	Hayley Scamurra	1.73 m (5 ft 8 in)	73 kg (161 lb)	14 December 1994 (aged 28)	(United States) PWHPA Harvey's
17	F	Britta Curl	1.75 m (5 ft 9 in)	72 kg (159 lb)	20 March 2000 (aged 23)	(United States) Wisconsin Badgers
21	F	Hilary Knight – C	1.80 m (5 ft 11 in)	78 kg (172 lb)	12 July 1989 (aged 33)	(United States) PWHPA Sonnet
22	F	Tessa Janecke	1.73 m (5 ft 8 in)	72 kg (159 lb)	12 May 2004 (aged 18)	(United States) Penn State Nittany Lions
23	F	Hannah Bilka	1.65 m (5 ft 5 in)	59 kg (130 lb)	24 March 2001 (aged 22)	(United States) Boston College
25	F	Alex Carpenter – A	1.70 m (5 ft 7 in)	70 kg (150 lb)	13 April 1994 (aged 28)	(China) Shenzhen KRS
27	F	Taylor Heise	1.78 m (5 ft 10 in)	66 kg (146 lb)	17 March 2000 (aged 23)	(United States) Minnesota Golden Gophers
28	F	Amanda Kessel	1.68 m (5 ft 6 in)	59 kg (130 lb)	28 August 1991 (aged 31)	(United States) PWHPA Adidas
29	G	Nicole Hensley	1.68 m (5 ft 6 in)	70 kg (150 lb)	23 June 1994 (aged 28)	(United States) PWHPA Sonnet
30	G	Abbey Levy	1.85 m (6 ft 1 in)	68 kg (150 lb)	2 April 2000 (aged 23)	(United States) Boston College
31	G	Aerin Frankel	1.65 m (5 ft 5 in)	63 kg (139 lb)	24 May 1999 (aged 23)	(United States) PWHPA Adidas
36	F	Gabbie Hughes	1.72 m (5 ft 8 in)	61 kg (134 lb)	4 October 1999 (aged 23)	(United States) Minnesota Duluth Bulldogs
37	F	Abbey Murphy	1.65 m (5 ft 5 in)	66 kg (146 lb)	14 April 2002 (aged 20)	(United States) Minnesota Golden Gophers

== Group B ==
=== Finland ===
The roster was announced on 21 March 2023.

Head coach: Juuso Toivola

No.	Pos.	Name	Height	Weight	Birthdate	Team
1	G	Sanni Ahola	1.71 m (5 ft 7 in)	75 kg (165 lb)	3 June 2000 (aged 22)	(United States) St. Cloud State Huskies
2	D	Sini Karjalainen	1.74 m (5 ft 9 in)	68 kg (150 lb)	30 January 1999 (aged 24)	(United States) Vermont Catamounts
4	D	Rosa Lindstedt	1.87 m (6 ft 2 in)	81 kg (179 lb)	24 January 1988 (aged 35)	(Sweden) Brynäs IF
6	D	Jenni Hiirikoski – C	1.62 m (5 ft 4 in)	62 kg (137 lb)	30 March 1987 (aged 36)	(Sweden) Luleå HF
7	D	Sanni Rantala	1.73 m (5 ft 8 in)	62 kg (137 lb)	8 July 2002 (aged 20)	(Finland) KalPa
9	D	Nelli Laitinen	1.69 m (5 ft 7 in)	62 kg (137 lb)	29 April 2002 (aged 20)	(United States) Minnesota Golden Gophers
12	F	Sanni Vanhanen	1.68 m (5 ft 6 in)	60 kg (130 lb)	1 July 2005 (aged 17)	(Finland) HIFK
14	D	Krista Parkkonen	1.68 m (5 ft 6 in)	65 kg (143 lb)	25 June 2002 (aged 20)	(United States) Vermont Catamounts
15	F	Oona Havana	1.71 m (5 ft 7 in)	65 kg (143 lb)	20 August 2004 (aged 18)	(Finland) Kärpät
16	F	Petra Nieminen – A	1.69 m (5 ft 7 in)	67 kg (148 lb)	4 May 1999 (aged 23)	(Sweden) Luleå HF
19	F	Emmi Rakkolainen	1.76 m (5 ft 9 in)	62 kg (137 lb)	9 August 1996 (aged 26)	(Finland) Kiekko-Espoo
20	F	Anna-Kaisa Antti-Roiko	1.68 m (5 ft 6 in)	60 kg (130 lb)	21 May 2004 (aged 18)	(Finland) Kärpät
24	F	Viivi Vainikka	1.66 m (5 ft 5 in)	67 kg (148 lb)	23 December 2001 (aged 21)	(Sweden) Luleå HF
25	F	Kiira Yrjänen	1.61 m (5 ft 3 in)	58 kg (128 lb)	2 January 2002 (aged 21)	(Sweden) HV71
27	F	Anni Montonen	1.69 m (5 ft 7 in)	60 kg (130 lb)	7 May 2000 (aged 22)	(Finland) Kiekko-Espoo
28	F	Jenniina Nylund	1.71 m (5 ft 7 in)	63 kg (139 lb)	18 June 1999 (aged 23)	(United States) St. Cloud State Huskies
30	G	Emilia Kyrkkö	1.69 m (5 ft 7 in)	68 kg (150 lb)	24 February 2004 (aged 19)	(Finland) Team Kuortane
32	F	Emilia Vesa	1.77 m (5 ft 10 in)	66 kg (146 lb)	3 January 2001 (aged 22)	(Finland) HIFK
34	F	Sofianna Sundelin	1.69 m (5 ft 7 in)	56 kg (123 lb)	13 January 2003 (aged 20)	(Finland) Team Kuortane
36	G	Anni Keisala	1.75 m (5 ft 9 in)	80 kg (180 lb)	5 April 1997 (aged 26)	(Sweden) HV71
40	F	Noora Tulus – A	1.65 m (5 ft 5 in)	59 kg (130 lb)	15 August 1995 (aged 27)	(Sweden) Luleå HF
88	D	Ronja Savolainen	1.77 m (5 ft 10 in)	74 kg (163 lb)	29 November 1997 (aged 25)	(Sweden) Luleå HF
91	F	Julia Liikala	1.66 m (5 ft 5 in)	64 kg (141 lb)	20 March 2001 (aged 22)	(Finland) HIFK

=== France ===
The roster was announced on 1 March 2023. Following the announcement, forward Shana Casanova and goaltender Justine Crousy Théode were added to the lineup.

Head coach: Grégory Tarlé

No.	Pos.	Name	Height	Weight	Birthdate	Team
1	G	Margaux Mameri	1.61 m (5 ft 3 in)	57 kg (126 lb)	12 April 1997 (aged 25)	(France) Evry-Viry
2	F	Lisa Cedelle	1.49 m (4 ft 11 in)	42 kg (93 lb)	19 September 2003 (aged 19)	(Canada) Saint-Laurent Patriotes
3	D	Mia Väänänen	1.73 m (5 ft 8 in)	68 kg (150 lb)	30 November 1999 (aged 23)	(Canada) McGill Martlets
4	D	Louanne Mermier	1.73 m (5 ft 8 in)	82 kg (181 lb)	1 February 2001 (aged 22)	(Canada) André-Laurendeau Boomerang
6	F	Margot Desvignes	1.58 m (5 ft 2 in)	76 kg (168 lb)	10 June 2000 (aged 22)	(Sweden) Falu IF
7	D	Lucie Quarto	1.69 m (5 ft 7 in)	65 kg (143 lb)	7 September 2002 (aged 20)	(France) Jokers de Cergy-Pontoise
8	F	Jade Barbirati	1.67 m (5 ft 6 in)	64 kg (141 lb)	6 January 2004 (aged 19)	(Canada) John Abbott College Islanders
10	D	Sophie Leclerc	1.63 m (5 ft 4 in)	61 kg (134 lb)	14 August 1997 (aged 25)	(France) Brûleurs de Loups
12	F	Estelle Duvin – A	1.71 m (5 ft 7 in)	65 kg (143 lb)	1 February 1997 (aged 26)	(Switzerland) EV Bomo Thun
13	D	Marie-Pierre Pélissou	1.73 m (5 ft 8 in)	69 kg (152 lb)	31 August 1995 (aged 27)	(Switzerland) EV Bomo Thun
14	D	Athéna Locatelli	1.60 m (5 ft 3 in)	59 kg (130 lb)	16 July 1991 (aged 31)	(Finland) HIFK
15	F	Betty Jouanny	1.59 m (5 ft 3 in)	55 kg (121 lb)	4 January 1992 (aged 31)	(Switzerland) HC Fribourg-Gottéron
16	F	Clara Rozier	1.61 m (5 ft 3 in)	58 kg (128 lb)	28 August 1997 (aged 25)	(Finland) HIFK
17	F	Chloé Aurard – A	1.68 m (5 ft 6 in)	61 kg (134 lb)	15 March 1999 (aged 24)	(United States) Northeastern Huskies
18	F	Anaé Simon	1.69 m (5 ft 7 in)	66 kg (146 lb)	16 December 2002 (aged 20)	(France) Drakkars de Caen
19	F	Lore Baudrit – C	1.90 m (6 ft 3 in)	85 kg (187 lb)	11 October 1991 (aged 31)	(Sweden) Linköping HC
20	G	Justine Crousy Théode	1.79 m (5 ft 10 in)	61 kg (134 lb)	6 March 2001 (aged 22)	(France) Reims Champagne
22	F	Manon le Scodan	1.61 m (5 ft 3 in)	67 kg (148 lb)	25 December 2004 (aged 18)	(Canada) John Abbott College Islanders
23	D	Perrine Lavorel	1.74 m (5 ft 9 in)	62 kg (137 lb)	16 January 2005 (aged 18)	(France) Annecy
24	F	Emma Nonnenmacher	1.70 m (5 ft 7 in)	60 kg (130 lb)	21 August 2004 (aged 18)	(Canada) Dawson College Blues
25	G	Caroline Lambert	1.64 m (5 ft 5 in)	67 kg (148 lb)	1 April 1995 (aged 28)	(Switzerland) HC Thurgau
27	F	Shana Casanova	1.58 m (5 ft 2 in)	58 kg (128 lb)	14 July 2004 (aged 18)	(France) Scorpions de Mulhouse
29	D	Léa Berger	1.77 m (5 ft 10 in)	66 kg (146 lb)	29 October 2003 (aged 19)	(Canada) Saint-Laurent Patriotes

=== Germany ===
The roster was announced on 24 March 2023.

Head coach: Thomas Schädler

No.	Pos.	Name	Height	Weight	Birthdate	Team
5	D	Charlott Schaffrath	1.84 m (6 ft 0 in)	68 kg (150 lb)	26 December 2005 (aged 17)	(Germany) ECDC Memmingen
6	F	Theresa Wagner	1.63 m (5 ft 4 in)	60 kg (130 lb)	5 May 1995 (aged 27)	(Germany) ERC Ingolstadt
7	F	Franziska Feldmeier	1.64 m (5 ft 5 in)	66 kg (146 lb)	5 February 1999 (aged 24)	(Germany) ESC Planegg-Würmtal
8	D	Ronja Hark	1.58 m (5 ft 2 in)	60 kg (130 lb)	17 August 2003 (aged 19)	(Germany) ECDC Memmingen
9	F	Svenja Voigt	1.65 m (5 ft 5 in)	60 kg (130 lb)	29 March 2004 (aged 19)	(United States) St. Cloud State Huskies
11	F	Nicola Eisenschmid	1.67 m (5 ft 6 in)	66 kg (146 lb)	10 September 1996 (aged 26)	(Sweden) Djurgårdens IF
13	F	Luisa Welcke	1.66 m (5 ft 5 in)	65 kg (143 lb)	29 April 2002 (aged 20)	(United States) Maine Black Bears
14	D	Carina Strobel	1.72 m (5 ft 8 in)	60 kg (130 lb)	11 September 1997 (aged 25)	(Germany) ECDC Memmingen
16	F	Jule Schiefer	1.73 m (5 ft 8 in)	68 kg (150 lb)	12 September 2001 (aged 21)	(Germany) ERC Ingolstadt
18	F	Bernadette Karpf – A	1.67 m (5 ft 6 in)	63 kg (139 lb)	3 July 1996 (aged 26)	(Sweden) Leksands IF
20	D	Daria Gleißner – C	1.70 m (5 ft 7 in)	68 kg (150 lb)	30 June 1993 (aged 29)	(Germany) ECDC Memmingen
21	D	Tabea Botthof	1.75 m (5 ft 9 in)	73 kg (161 lb)	1 June 2000 (aged 22)	(Sweden) SDE Hockey
22	F	Marie Delarbre	1.72 m (5 ft 8 in)	69 kg (152 lb)	22 January 1994 (aged 29)	(Sweden) Djurgårdens IF
25	F	Laura Kluge – A	1.79 m (5 ft 10 in)	63 kg (139 lb)	6 November 1996 (aged 26)	(Germany) ECDC Memmingen
26	F	Anne Bartsch	1.64 m (5 ft 5 in)	63 kg (139 lb)	22 September 1995 (aged 27)	(Germany) ECDC Memmingen
27	D	Heidi Strompf	1.64 m (5 ft 5 in)	58 kg (128 lb)	10 September 2002 (aged 20)	(Slovakia) ŽHK Šarišanka Prešov
28	D	Nina Jobst-Smith	1.70 m (5 ft 7 in)	68 kg (150 lb)	30 August 2001 (aged 21)	(United States) Minnesota Duluth Bulldogs
29	F	Nina Christof	1.64 m (5 ft 5 in)	66 kg (146 lb)	18 August 2002 (aged 20)	(United States) RPI Engineers
31	G	Johanna May	1.68 m (5 ft 6 in)	85 kg (187 lb)	23 April 2000 (aged 22)	(Germany) ESC River Rats Geretsried
34	F	Celina Haider	1.70 m (5 ft 7 in)	62 kg (137 lb)	20 July 2000 (aged 22)	(Germany) ERC Ingolstadt
35	G	Sandra Abstreiter	1.81 m (5 ft 11 in)	78 kg (172 lb)	23 July 1998 (aged 24)	(United States) Providence Friars
36	F	Sonja Weidenfelder	1.68 m (5 ft 6 in)	63 kg (139 lb)	7 March 1993 (aged 30)	(Germany) ECDC Memmingen
67	G	Chiara Schultes	1.66 m (5 ft 5 in)	59 kg (130 lb)	22 July 2005 (aged 17)	(Germany) EHC Straubing

=== Hungary ===
The roster was announced on 27 March 2023.

Head coach: (Italy) Pat Cortina

No.	Pos.	Name	Height	Weight	Birthdate	Team
1	G	Anikó Németh	1.65 m (5 ft 5 in)	57 kg (126 lb)	6 September 1996 (aged 26)	(Hungary) MAC Budapest
2	D	Bernadett Németh	1.65 m (5 ft 5 in)	55 kg (121 lb)	6 September 1996 (aged 26)	(Hungary) MAC Budapest
3	F	Hayley Williams	1.63 m (5 ft 4 in)	59 kg (130 lb)	3 June 1990 (aged 32)	(Russia) Dinamo-Neva St. Petersburg
4	D	Taylor Baker	1.65 m (5 ft 5 in)	66 kg (146 lb)	30 July 1997 (aged 25)	(Canada) Montreal Force
7	F	Zsófia Pázmándi	1.63 m (5 ft 4 in)	62 kg (137 lb)	16 December 2002 (aged 20)	(Canada) OHA Tardiff
8	F	Petra Szamosfalvi	1.64 m (5 ft 5 in)	61 kg (134 lb)	10 May 2002 (aged 20)	(Hungary) HK Budapest
10	F	Imola Horváth	1.68 m (5 ft 6 in)	73 kg (161 lb)	2 August 2002 (aged 20)	(Hungary) MAC Budapest
11	F	Fanni Garát-Gasparics – C	1.67 m (5 ft 6 in)	62 kg (137 lb)	20 November 1994 (aged 28)	(United States) Metropolitan Riveters
12	F	Lara Strobl	1.55 m (5 ft 1 in)	48 kg (106 lb)	11 May 2003 (aged 19)	(Hungary) HK Budapest
13	D	Lotti Odnoga	1.74 m (5 ft 9 in)	71 kg (157 lb)	19 January 1999 (aged 24)	(United States) St. Thomas Tommies
14	D	Franciska Kiss-Simon – A	1.80 m (5 ft 11 in)	74 kg (163 lb)	7 November 1995 (aged 27)	(Hungary) HK Budapest
15	F	Réka Dabasi – A	1.68 m (5 ft 6 in)	62 kg (137 lb)	24 December 1996 (aged 26)	(United States) Metropolitan Riveters
17	D	Enikő Tóth	1.63 m (5 ft 4 in)	61 kg (134 lb)	17 March 1996 (aged 27)	(Hungary) Budapest JA
18	F	Alexandra Huszák	1.73 m (5 ft 8 in)	62 kg (137 lb)	18 June 1995 (aged 27)	(Hungary) HK Budapest
22	F	Alexandra Rónai	1.60 m (5 ft 3 in)	61 kg (134 lb)	8 December 1993 (aged 29)	(Hungary) MAC Budapest
25	G	Bianka Bogáti	1.63 m (5 ft 4 in)	53 kg (117 lb)	21 January 2005 (aged 18)	(Hungary) HK Budapest
26	D	Lilla Faggyas	1.75 m (5 ft 9 in)	62 kg (137 lb)	25 February 2002 (aged 21)	(Hungary) HK Budapest
33	G	Zsuzsa Révész	1.65 m (5 ft 5 in)	78 kg (172 lb)	17 August 2005 (aged 17)	(Hungary) DEAC JA
71	D	Fruzsina Mayer	1.68 m (5 ft 6 in)	75 kg (165 lb)	16 July 2000 (aged 22)	(Hungary) HK Budapest
72	F	Míra Seregély	1.76 m (5 ft 9 in)	68 kg (150 lb)	27 April 2003 (aged 19)	(United States) Maine Black Bears
77	F	Regina Metzler	1.78 m (5 ft 10 in)	73 kg (161 lb)	25 October 2005 (aged 17)	(Canada) OHA Tardiff
88	F	Emma Kreisz	1.75 m (5 ft 9 in)	73 kg (161 lb)	2 September 2003 (aged 19)	(Canada) Stanstead College
96	D	Sarah Knee	1.85 m (6 ft 1 in)	85 kg (187 lb)	29 March 1996 (aged 27)	(Finland) KalPa
97	F	Kinga Jókai Szilágyi	1.68 m (5 ft 6 in)	62 kg (137 lb)	19 August 1997 (aged 25)	(Hungary) MAC Budapest

=== Sweden ===
The roster was announced on 17 March 2023.

Head Coach: Ulf Lundberg

No.	Pos.	Name	Height	Weight	Birthdate	Team
1	G	Sara Grahn	1.70 m (5 ft 7 in)	67 kg (148 lb)	25 September 1988 (aged 34)	(Sweden) Luleå HF
2	D	Paula Bergström	1.72 m (5 ft 8 in)	69 kg (152 lb)	26 January 1999 (aged 24)	(United States) LIU Sharks
3	D	Anna Kjellbin – C	1.69 m (5 ft 7 in)	63 kg (139 lb)	16 March 1994 (aged 29)	(Sweden) Luleå HF
4	D	Linnéa Andersson	1.71 m (5 ft 7 in)	68 kg (150 lb)	30 September 1998 (aged 24)	(Sweden) MoDo Hockey
5	D	Annie Silén	1.71 m (5 ft 7 in)	73 kg (161 lb)	28 March 2002 (aged 21)	(Sweden) Leksands IF
6	D	Josefine Holmgren	1.75 m (5 ft 9 in)	73 kg (161 lb)	11 April 1993 (aged 29)	(Sweden) Djurgårdens IF
7	D	Mira Jungåker	1.70 m (5 ft 7 in)	68 kg (150 lb)	22 July 2005 (aged 17)	(Sweden) HV71
8	F	Hilda Svensson	1.67 m (5 ft 6 in)	64 kg (141 lb)	24 August 2006 (aged 16)	(Sweden) HV71
10	D	Nathalie Lidman	1.71 m (5 ft 7 in)	73 kg (161 lb)	28 May 2001 (aged 21)	(Sweden) Leksands IF
11	F	Josefin Bouveng	1.75 m (5 ft 9 in)	69 kg (152 lb)	15 May 2001 (aged 21)	(United States) Minnesota Golden Gophers
12	D	Maja Nylén Persson – A	1.64 m (5 ft 5 in)	67 kg (148 lb)	20 November 2000 (aged 22)	(Sweden) Brynäs IF
15	F	Lisa Johansson	1.61 m (5 ft 3 in)	58 kg (128 lb)	11 April 1992 (aged 30)	(Sweden) Luleå HF
17	F	Sofie Lundin	1.64 m (5 ft 5 in)	64 kg (141 lb)	15 February 2000 (aged 23)	(United States) Ohio State Buckeyes
19	F	Sara Hjalmarsson	1.76 m (5 ft 9 in)	74 kg (163 lb)	8 February 1998 (aged 25)	(United States) Providence Friars
20	F	Fanny Rask	1.68 m (5 ft 6 in)	64 kg (141 lb)	21 May 1991 (aged 31)	(Sweden) Djurgårdens IF
21	F	Lova Blom	1.68 m (5 ft 6 in)	78 kg (172 lb)	15 July 2003 (aged 19)	(Sweden) Djurgårdens IF
22	F	Hanna Thuvik	1.70 m (5 ft 7 in)	72 kg (159 lb)	17 May 2002 (aged 20)	(Sweden) Brynäs IF
23	F	Ebba Hedqvist	1.67 m (5 ft 6 in)	67 kg (148 lb)	30 September 2006 (aged 16)	(Sweden) MoDo Hockey
24	F	Felizia Wikner-Zienkiewicz	1.70 m (5 ft 7 in)	65 kg (143 lb)	17 September 1999 (aged 23)	(Sweden) Brynäs IF
25	F	Lina Ljungblom	1.67 m (5 ft 6 in)	79 kg (174 lb)	15 October 2001 (aged 21)	(Sweden) MoDo Hockey
26	F	Hanna Olsson	1.73 m (5 ft 8 in)	69 kg (152 lb)	20 January 1999 (aged 24)	(Sweden) Frölunda HC
29	F	Olivia Carlsson – A	1.74 m (5 ft 9 in)	75 kg (165 lb)	2 March 1995 (aged 28)	(Sweden) MoDo Hockey
30	G	Emma Söderberg	1.71 m (5 ft 7 in)	69 kg (152 lb)	18 February 1998 (aged 25)	(United States) Minnesota Duluth Bulldogs
35	G	Tindra Holm	1.72 m (5 ft 8 in)	68 kg (150 lb)	26 May 2001 (aged 21)	(United States) LIU Sharks
