= 2024 IIHF Women's World Championship Division I =

International ice hockey tournament

Tournament details
- Host countries: Austria; Latvia
- Venues: 2 (in 2 host cities)
- Dates: 21–27 April; 31 March – 6 April
- Teams: 12

The 2024 IIHF Women's World Championship Division I consisted of two international ice hockey tournaments of the 2024 Women's Ice Hockey World Championships organized by the International Ice Hockey Federation (IIHF).

The Group A tournament was played in Klagenfurt, Austria from 21 to 27 April 2024, while Group B was held in Riga, Latvia, from 31 March to 6 April 2024. Group A would have returned to Shenzhen, China had the Chinese team not been promoted.

Hungary and Norway were promoted from Group A to the top division and South Korea was relegated. In Group B, Slovakia were promoted to the Group A tournament for next year while Poland were relegated to Division II.

== Group A tournament ==
2024 IIHF Women's World Championship Division I A

Tournament details
- Host country: Austria
- City: Klagenfurt
- Venue: 1 (in 1 host city)
- Dates: 21–27 April
- Teams: 6

Tournament statistics
- Games played: 15
- Goals scored: 76 (5.07 per game)
- Attendance: 14,055 (937 per game)
- Scoring leader: (France) Estelle Duvin (10 points)

Official website
- IIHF

=== Participants ===
Team	Qualification
Hungary	Placed 9th in 2023 Top Division and was relegated.
France	Placed 10th in 2023 Top Division and was relegated.
Austria	Host, placed 3rd in 2023 Division I A.
Netherlands	Placed 4th in 2023 Division I A.
Norway	Placed 5th in 2023 Division I A.
South Korea	Placed 1st in 2023 Division I B and was promoted.

=== Match officials ===
Eight referees and eight linesmen were selected for the tournament.

Referees	Linesmen
(United Kingdom) Hollie Neenan; (Japan) Anna Kuroda; (Japan) Miyuki Nakayama; (Latvia) Agnese Kārkliņa; (Sweden) Anna Hammar; (United States) Kelly Cooke; (United States) Kaylen Hanson; (United States) Charlotte Hurley	(Canada) Erin Zach; (Denmark) Cassandra Repstock-Romme; (Norway) Maren Frohaug; (Sweden) Julia Johansson; (Sweden) Jessica Lundgren; (Switzerland) Anina Schüpbach; (United States) Jennifer Cameron; (United States) Breana Kraut

=== Standings ===
Pos	Team	Pld	W	OTW	OTL	L	GF	GA	GD	Pts	Promotion or relegation
1	Norway	5	2	3	0	0	18	6	+12	12	Promoted to the 2025 Top Division
2	Hungary	5	3	0	2	0	9	6	+3	11	Promoted to the 2025 Top Division
3	France	5	3	0	1	1	19	10	+9	10	
4	Austria (H)	5	1	2	0	2	20	15	+5	7	
5	Netherlands	5	1	0	2	2	9	15	−6	5	
6	South Korea	5	0	0	0	5	1	24	−23	0	Relegated to the 2025 Division I B

Source: IIHF
Rules for classification: 1) points; 2) head-to-head points; 3) head-to-head goal difference; 4) head-to-head number of goals scored; 5) result against closest best-ranked team outside tied teams; 6) result against second-best ranked team outside tied teams; 7) seeding before tournament.
(H) Host

=== Results ===
All times are local (UTC+2)

21 April 2024; 11:30	Netherlands	1–5 (0–1, 1–3, 0–1)	France	Stadthalle, Klagenfurt; Attendance: 350

Game reference

Eline Gabriele
Goalies
Margaux Mameri
Referees:
(United States) Kaylen Hanson
(United States) Charlotte Hurley
Linesmen:
(Sweden) Julia Johansson
(Denmark) Cassandra Repstock-Romme

	0–1	18:23 – Barbirati (Le Scodan, Pélissou)
	0–2	21:21 – Huot-Marchand (De Serres, Aurard)
	0–3	28:29 – Villiot (Le Scodan, Huot-Marchand)
Van Nes (Zwarthoed, Barbier) – 36:20	1–3
	1–4	39:22 – Villiot (Duvin, Aurard) (PP)
	1–5	46:14 – Duvin (Nonnenmacher, Rozier)

10 min
Penalties
4 min
23
Shots
36

21 April 2024; 15:00	South Korea	0–2 (0–0, 0–1, 0–1)	Hungary	Stadthalle, Klagenfurt; Attendance: 380

Game reference
Park Jong-ju	Goalies	Anikó Németh	Referees: (Japan) Anna Kuroda (Japan) Miyuki Nakayama; Linesmen: (Norway) Maren Frohaug (Sweden) Jessica Lundgren
0–1 / 36:14 – Huszák (Dabasi, Mayer); 0–2 / 52:44 – Kreisz (Pázmándi, Jókai Szilágyi)			Referees: (Japan) Anna Kuroda (Japan) Miyuki Nakayama; Linesmen: (Norway) Maren Frohaug (Sweden) Jessica Lundgren
8 min	Penalties	2 min	Referees: (Japan) Anna Kuroda (Japan) Miyuki Nakayama; Linesmen: (Norway) Maren Frohaug (Sweden) Jessica Lundgren
9	Shots	37	Referees: (Japan) Anna Kuroda (Japan) Miyuki Nakayama; Linesmen: (Norway) Maren Frohaug (Sweden) Jessica Lundgren

21 April 2024; 18:30	Norway	3–2 (0–0, 0–1, 3–1)	Austria	Stadthalle, Klagenfurt; Attendance: 1,758

Game reference

Ena Nystrøm
Goalies
Selma Luggin
Referees:
(Latvia) Agnese Kārkliņa
(United Kingdom) Hollie Neenan
Linesmen:
(United States) Breana Kraut
(Canada) Erin Zach

	0–1	23:19 – Fazokas (Trummer)
Sirum (Bergesen) (PP) – 41:33	1–1
Biseth Engmann – 45:12	2–1
Sirum (Fischer, Bergesen) – 47:00	3–1
	3–2	56:58 – Fazokas (Meixner, Schafzahl) (PP2)

16 min
Penalties
6 min
26
Shots
34

22 April 2024; 12:30	Hungary	2–0 (1–0, 1–0, 0–0)	Netherlands	Stadthalle, Klagenfurt; Attendance: 712

Game reference
Anikó Németh	Goalies	Eline Gabriele	Referees: (United States) Charlotte Hurley (United Kingdom) Hollie Neenan; Linesmen: (United States) Jennifer Cameron (Switzerland) Anina Schüpbach
Pázmándi (Baker, Kreisz) (PP) – 12:22 / 1–0; Dabasi (Huszák, Kiss-Simon) – 39:10 / 2–0			Referees: (United States) Charlotte Hurley (United Kingdom) Hollie Neenan; Linesmen: (United States) Jennifer Cameron (Switzerland) Anina Schüpbach
10 min	Penalties	10 min	Referees: (United States) Charlotte Hurley (United Kingdom) Hollie Neenan; Linesmen: (United States) Jennifer Cameron (Switzerland) Anina Schüpbach
32	Shots	22	Referees: (United States) Charlotte Hurley (United Kingdom) Hollie Neenan; Linesmen: (United States) Jennifer Cameron (Switzerland) Anina Schüpbach

22 April 2024; 16:00	France	3–4 GWS (0–3, 2–0, 1–0) (OT: 0–0) (SO: 0–1)	Norway	Stadthalle, Klagenfurt; Attendance: 345

Game reference

Justine Crousy-Théode
Goalies
Ena Nystrøm
Referees:
(Sweden) Anna Hammar
(Japan) Miyuki Nakayama
Linesmen:
(Norway) Maren Frohaug
(Canada) Erin Zach

	0–1	05:35 – K. Pedersen (Tillman, Morset)
	0–2	10:11 – Morset
	0–3	17:19 – Sirum (Bergesen, Kruse Johansen)
Rozier (Duvin, Aurard) (PP) – 36:50	1–3
Aurard (Rozier, De Serres) (PP) – 38:22	2–3
De Serres (Duvin, Aurard) (PP) – 57:09	3–3

Aurard (miss)
Barbirati (miss)
Duvin
Le Scodan (miss)
Rozier (miss)
Duvin
Duvin
Aurard (miss)
Rozier
Duvin (miss)
Shootout
(miss) Sirum
(miss) Bergesen
(miss) Dalen
(miss) Haug Hansen
Kruse Johansen
Fischer
Fischer
(miss) Kruse Johansen
Sirum
Dalen
12 min
Penalties
14 min
29
Shots
27

22 April 2024; 19:30	Austria	6–0 (2–0, 0–0, 4–0)	South Korea	Stadthalle, Klagenfurt; Attendance: 1,367

Game reference

Magdalena Luggin
Goalies
Park Jong-ju
Referees:
(United States) Kelly Cooke
(Japan) Anna Kuroda
Linesmen:
(Sweden) Julia Johansson
(Denmark) Cassandra Repstock-Romme

Fazokas (Trummer) – 16:51	1–0
Meixner (Schafzahl) – 18:32	2–0
Meixner (Schafzahl, Fazokas) – 40:27	3–0
Dauböck (Lüftenegger) – 56:25	4–0
Grascher (Kutzer, Wittich) – 57:12	5–0
Meixner (Dauböck, Schafzahl) (PP) – 58:08	6–0

6 min
Penalties
6 min
29
Shots
17

24 April 2024; 12:30	Hungary	1–2 GWS (0–0, 0–1, 1–0) (OT: 0–0) (SO: 0–1)	Norway	Stadthalle, Klagenfurt; Attendance: 411

Game reference
Anikó Németh	Goalies	Ena Nystrøm	Referees: (United States) Kelly Cooke (United States) Charlotte Hurley; Linesmen: (Sweden) Jessica Lundgren (Canada) Erin Zach
/ 0–1 / 34:01 – Fischer (Bergesen); Huszák (Dabasi, Kiss-Simon) (PP) – 54:21 / 1–1			Referees: (United States) Kelly Cooke (United States) Charlotte Hurley; Linesmen: (Sweden) Jessica Lundgren (Canada) Erin Zach
Jókai Szilágyi (miss); Kreisz (miss); Pázmándi; Huszák (miss); Dabasi (miss); Odnoga (miss); Seregély (miss); Kreisz (miss)	Shootout	(miss) Kruse Johansen; (miss) Haug Hansen; (miss) Sirum; Fischer; (miss) Dalen; (miss) Fischer; (miss) Dalen; Sirum	Referees: (United States) Kelly Cooke (United States) Charlotte Hurley; Linesmen: (Sweden) Jessica Lundgren (Canada) Erin Zach
8 min	Penalties	12 min	Referees: (United States) Kelly Cooke (United States) Charlotte Hurley; Linesmen: (Sweden) Jessica Lundgren (Canada) Erin Zach
45	Shots	21	Referees: (United States) Kelly Cooke (United States) Charlotte Hurley; Linesmen: (Sweden) Jessica Lundgren (Canada) Erin Zach

24 April 2024; 16:00	South Korea	1–3 (0–1, 1–0, 0–2)	Netherlands	Stadthalle, Klagenfurt; Attendance: 435

Game reference

Park Jong-ju
Goalies
Eline Gabriele
Referees:
(United States) Kaylen Hanson
(Latvia) Agnese Kārkliņa
Linesmen:
(United States) Breana Kraut
(Switzerland) Anina Schüpbach

	0–1	14:40 – Hamers (Wielenga) (PP)
Song Y. (Kim T., Park Ji.) – 34:08	1–1
	1–2	45:25 – Milders (De Jong, Van Nes)
	1–3	59:52 – Wielenga (Van Nes) (EN)

6 min
Penalties
6 min
19
Shots
28

24 April 2024; 19:30	France	5–3 (1–1, 1–1, 3–1)	Austria	Stadthalle, Klagenfurt; Attendance: 1,942

Game reference

Justine Crousy-Théode
Goalies
Selma Luggin
Referees:
(Sweden) Anna Hammar
(Japan) Anna Kuroda
Linesmen:
(United States) Jennifer Cameron
(Sweden) Julia Johansson

	0–1	10:09 – Dauböck (Fazokas)
Duvin – 14:05	1–1
	1–2	22:55 – Schafzahl (Hofbauer, Fazokas) (PP)
Rozier (Duvin, Aurard) – 34:45	2–2
	2–3	42:47 – Schafzahl (Meixner, Trummer)
Duvin (Rozier) – 49:42	3–3
Nonnenmacher (Baudrit) – 50:30	4–3
Duvin (Baudrit) (EN) – 59:59	5–3

8 min
Penalties
2 min
16
Shots
29

26 April 2024; 12:30	France	5–0 (2–0, 1–0, 2–0)	South Korea	Stadthalle, Klagenfurt; Attendance: 416

Margaux Mameri
Goalies
Park Jong-ju
Cheon Hyo-seo
Referees:
(United States) Kelly Cooke
(Latvia) Agnese Kārkliņa
Linesmen:
(United States) Breana Kraut
(Denmark) Cassandra Repstock-Romme

Quarto (Baudrit, Nonnenmacher) – 01:05	1–0
Simon – 01:50	2–0
Villiot (Rozier, Aurard) (PP) – 20:51	3–0
Quarto (Duvin) – 42:45	4–0
Cédelle (De Serres, Duvin) – 46:29	5–0

0 min
Penalties
4 min
31
Shots
16

26 April 2024; 16:00	Netherlands	0–1 GWS (0–0, 0–0, 0–0) (OT: 0–0) (SO: 0–1)	Norway	Stadthalle, Klagenfurt; Attendance: 435

Game reference
Eline Gabriele	Goalies	Ena Nystrøm	Referees: (United States) Kaylen Hanson (United Kingdom) Hollie Neenan; Linesmen: (Sweden) Jessica Lundgren (Switzerland) Anina Schüpbach
Hamers (miss); Wielenga (miss); Van Nes (miss); Zwarthoed (miss)	Shootout	(miss) Haug Hansen; (miss) Dalen; (miss) Sirum; Kruse Johansen; Fischer	Referees: (United States) Kaylen Hanson (United Kingdom) Hollie Neenan; Linesmen: (Sweden) Jessica Lundgren (Switzerland) Anina Schüpbach
12 min	Penalties	8 min	Referees: (United States) Kaylen Hanson (United Kingdom) Hollie Neenan; Linesmen: (Sweden) Jessica Lundgren (Switzerland) Anina Schüpbach
22	Shots	32	Referees: (United States) Kaylen Hanson (United Kingdom) Hollie Neenan; Linesmen: (Sweden) Jessica Lundgren (Switzerland) Anina Schüpbach

26 April 2024; 20:25	Austria	3–2 GWS (2–2, 0–0, 0–0) (OT: 0–0) (SO: 1–0)	Hungary	Stadthalle, Klagenfurt; Attendance: 2,279

Game reference

Magdalena Luggin
Goalies
Anikó Németh
Referees:
(Sweden) Anna Hammar
(Japan) Miyuki Nakayama
Linesmen:
(United States) Jennifer Cameron
(Norway) Maren Frohaug

	0–1	02:36 – Seregély (Huszák, Kiss-Simon) (PP)
	0–2	06:07 – Németh (Pázmándi, Jókai Szilágyi)
Fazokas (Kutzer, Schafzahl) – 19:09	1–2
Artner (Kutzer) – 19:34	2–2

Grascher (miss)
Trummer
Fazokas (miss)
Schafzahl (miss)
Meixner
Shootout
Metzler
(miss) Huszák
(miss) Pázmándi
(miss) Kreisz
(miss) Dabasi
6 min
Penalties
4 min
14
Shots
28

27 April 2024; 12:30	Norway	8–0 (3–0, 3–0, 2–0)	South Korea	Stadthalle, Klagenfurt; Attendance: 358

Game reference

Ena Nystrøm
Goalies
Cheon Hyo-seo
Park Jong-ju
Referees:
(United States) Charlotte Hurley
(Japan) Anna Kuroda
Linesmen:
(United States) Jennifer Cameron
(Switzerland) Anina Schüpbach

Bergesen (Løkke Nyberg, L. Pedersen) – 02:27	1–0
Løkke Nyberg (Morset, Biseth Engmann) – 05:59	2–0
Løkke Nyberg (Tillman, Biseth Engmann) – 06:08	3–0
Kruse Johansen (Løkke Nyberg, Sirum) – 21:01	4–0
Tillman (Jørgensen, Furulund) – 30:57	5–0
Haug Hansen – 33:02	6–0
Dalen (Jørgensen) – 46:22	7–0
Bjelland (K. Pedersen) – 46:35	8–0

10 min
Penalties
8 min
37
Shots
13

27 April 2024; 16:00	Hungary	2–1 (0–1, 1–0, 1–0)	France	Stadthalle, Klagenfurt; Attendance: 482

Game reference

Anikó Németh
Goalies
Justine Crousy-Théode
Referees:
(United States) Kelly Cooke
(Sweden) Anna Hammar
Linesmen:
(Sweden) Jessica Lundgren
(Canada) Erin Zach

	0–1	00:43 – Baudrit (Aurard, Leclerc)
Jókai Szilágyi (Kreisz) – 39:04	1–1
Seregély (Huszák, Kiss-Simon) (PP) – 42:30	2–1

29 min
Penalties
4 min
22
Shots
25

27 April 2024; 20:25	Austria	6–5 OT (2–2, 3–1, 0–2) (OT: 1–0)	Netherlands	Stadthalle, Klagenfurt; Attendance: 2,385

Game reference

Magdalena Luggin
Goalies
Eline Gabriele
Arwen ten Cate
Referees:
(Latvia) Agnese Kārkliņa
(United Kingdom) Hollie Neenan
Linesmen:
(Norway) Maren Frohaug
(Sweden) Julia Johansson

	0–1	00:10 – Hamers
Hofbauer (Dauböck, Schall) – 04:50	1–1
Lüftenegger (Linzbichler) – 07:25	2–1
	2–2	14:16 – Hamers (Zwarthoed, Wielenga) (PP)
Schafzahl (Trummer, Meixner) – 30:08	3–2
Hengelmüller (Linzbichler) – 32:50	4–2
	4–3	33:24 – Van Nes (Seppenwolde)
Schafzahl (Meixner, Fazokas) – 33:57	5–3
	5–4	55:42 – Zwarthoed (Huisman, Hamers) (PP)
	5–5	59:35 – Milders (Barbier, Zwarthoed) (PP, EA)
Fazokas (PP) – 62:48	6–5

14 min
Penalties
8 min
25
Shots
31

=== Statistics ===
==== Scoring leaders ====
List shows the top skaters sorted by points, then goals.

Player	GP	G	A	Pts	+/−	PIM	POS
(France) Estelle Duvin	5	4	6	10	+4	4	F
(Austria) Annika Fazokas	5	5	4	9	+8	4	D
(Austria) Theresa Schafzahl	5	4	5	9	+7	0	F
(Austria) Anna Meixner	5	3	4	7	+5	2	F
(France) Chloé Aurard	5	1	6	7	+1	0	D
(France) Clara Rozier	5	2	4	6	+4	4	D
(Hungary) Alexandra Huszák	5	2	3	5	+1	0	F
(France) Lore Baudrit	5	1	4	5	+4	2	F
(Norway) Emma Bergesen	5	1	4	5	+5	2	D
(Netherlands) Kayleigh Hamers	5	3	1	4	0	4	D
(Norway) Millie Sirum	5	3	1	4	+4	10	F

GP = Games played; G = Goals; A = Assists; Pts = Points; +/− = Plus/Minus; PIM = Penalties in Minutes; POS = Position
Source: IIHF.com

==== Goaltending leaders ====
Only the top five goaltenders, based on save percentage, who have played at least 40% of their team's minutes, are included in this list.

Player	TOI	GA	GAA	SA	Sv%	SO
(Norway) Ena Nystrøm	315:00	6	1.14	143	95.80	2
(Hungary) Anikó Németh	310:00	4	0.77	89	95.51	2
(France) Justine Crousy-Théode	162:37	5	1.84	68	92.65	0
(France) Margaux Mameri	140:00	4	1.71	48	91.67	1
(Netherlands) Eline Gabriele	280:38	11	2.35	132	91.67	1

TOI = time on ice (minutes:seconds); SA = shots against; GA = goals against; GAA = goals against average; Sv% = save percentage; SO = shutouts
Source: IIHF.com

=== Awards ===
Position	Player
Goaltender	(Norway) Ena Nystrøm
Defenceman	(Austria) Annika Fazokas
Forward	(France) Estelle Duvin

== Group B tournament ==
2024 IIHF Women's World Championship Division I B

Tournament details
- Host country: Latvia
- City: Riga
- Venue: 1 (in 1 host city)
- Dates: 31 March – 6 April
- Teams: 6

Tournament statistics
- Games played: 15
- Goals scored: 78 (5.2 per game)
- Attendance: 4,849 (323 per game)
- Scoring leader: (Latvia) Karīna Šilajāne (9 points)

Awards
- MVP: (Latvia) Karīna Šilajāne

Official website
- IIHF

=== Participants ===
Team	Qualification
Slovakia	Placed 6th in 2023 Division I A and was relegated.
Poland	Placed 2nd in 2023 Division I B.
Italy	Placed 3rd in 2023 Division I B.
Slovenia	Placed 4th in 2023 Division I B.
Great Britain	Placed 5th in 2023 Division I B.
Latvia	Host, placed 1st in 2023 Division II A and was promoted.

=== Match officials ===
Four referees and seven linesmen were selected for the tournament.

Referees	Linesmen
(Canada) Grace Barlow; (Finland) Reetta-Kaisa Lusi; (Italy) Anneke Orlandini; (Sweden) Maria Furberg	(Australia) Bethany Bowshall; (Canada) Joanie Duchesneau; (Canada) Sophie Thomson; (Hungary) Zóra Gottlibet; (Latvia) Baiba Dzene; (Slovakia) Magdaléna Jonáková; (Sweden) Ottilia Classon

=== Standings ===
Pos	Team	Pld	W	OTW	OTL	L	GF	GA	GD	Pts	Promotion or relegation
1	Slovakia	5	4	0	0	1	25	6	+19	12	Promoted to the 2025 Division I A
2	Latvia (H)	5	3	0	1	1	16	15	+1	10	
3	Italy	5	3	0	0	2	13	8	+5	9	
4	Great Britain	5	2	0	1	2	8	14	−6	7	
5	Slovenia	5	1	1	0	3	10	16	−6	5	
6	Poland	5	0	1	0	4	6	19	−13	2	Relegated to the 2025 Division II A

Source: IIHF
Rules for classification: 1) points; 2) head-to-head points; 3) head-to-head goal difference; 4) head-to-head number of goals scored; 5) result against closest best-ranked team outside tied teams; 6) result against second-best ranked team outside tied teams; 7) seeding before tournament.
(H) Host

=== Results ===
All times are local (UTC+3)

31 March 2024; 12:30	Great Britain	1–0 (0–0, 1–0, 0–0)	Italy	Volvo Sports Center, Riga; Attendance: 144

Game reference
Nicole Jackson	Goalies	Martina Fedel	Referee: (Sweden) Maria Furberg; Linesmen: (Canada) Joanie Duchesneau (Latvia) Baiba Dzene
Alderson-Smith (Marsden, Horwood) – 37:55 / 1–0			Referee: (Sweden) Maria Furberg; Linesmen: (Canada) Joanie Duchesneau (Latvia) Baiba Dzene
8 min	Penalties	2 min	Referee: (Sweden) Maria Furberg; Linesmen: (Canada) Joanie Duchesneau (Latvia) Baiba Dzene
30	Shots	44	Referee: (Sweden) Maria Furberg; Linesmen: (Canada) Joanie Duchesneau (Latvia) Baiba Dzene

31 March 2024; 16:30	Slovenia	4–1 (2–1, 1–0, 1–0)	Poland	Volvo Sports Center, Riga; Attendance: 108

Game reference

Pia Dukarič
Goalies
Martyna Sass
Referee:
(Italy) Anneke Orlandini
Linesmen:
(Sweden) Ottilia Classon
(Slovakia) Magdaléna Jonáková

Pren (Nylaander, Confidenti) (PP) – 03:15	1–0
	1–1	04:13 – Zielińska (Sikorska)
Svetina (Blazinšek, Pezdir) – 15:36	2–1
Blazinšek (Pezdir) – 21:38	3–1
Nylaander (Pren, Confidenti) (PP) – 43:25	4–1

14 min
Penalties
10 min
32
Shots
66

31 March 2024; 19:30	Latvia	1–7 (1–1, 0–6, 0–0)	Slovakia	Volvo Sports Center, Riga; Attendance: 570

Game reference

Kristiāna Apsīte
Goalies
Andrea Rišianová
Referee:
(Finland) Reetta-Kaisa Lusi
Linesmen:
(Hungary) Zóra Gottlibet
(Canada) Sophie Thomson

Lagzdina (Yip-Chuck, Šilajāne) (PP) – 05:12	1–0
	1–1	19:59 – Hlinka (Šuliková, Nemčeková) (PP)
	1–2	23:55 – Kapičáková
	1–3	28:39 – Blichová (Beňáková, Klimášová)
	1–4	29:01 – Kubeková (Korenková, Halušková)
	1–5	35:54 – Tóthová (Kapičáková, Šuliková)
	1–6	37:13 – Tóthová (SH)
	1–7	39:57 – Kapičáková (Hlinka)

8 min
Penalties
8 min
21
Shots
51

1 April 2024; 12:30	Poland	3–2 OT (0–2, 1–0, 1–0) (OT: 1–0)	Great Britain	Volvo Sports Center, Riga; Attendance: 132

Game reference

Martyna Sass
Goalies
Nicole Jackson
Referee:
(Finland) Reetta-Kaisa Lusi
Linesmen:
(Sweden) Ottilia Classon
(Hungary) Zóra Gottlibet

	0–1	03:43 – Sylvester (Headland, Gale)
	0–2	17:49 – Horwood (Alderson-Smith)
Onyshchenko (Późniewska, Gogoc) – 25:29	1–2
Tomczok (Zielińska, Sikorska) (PP, EA) – 59:30	2–2
Dziwok (Tomczok) – 61:23	3–2

2 min
Penalties
2 min
29
Shots
30

1 April 2024; 16:30	Slovakia	4–0 (2–0, 1–0, 1–0)	Slovenia	Volvo Sports Center, Riga; Attendance: 110

Game reference

Andrea Rišianová
Goalies
Pia Dukarič
Referee:
(Canada) Grace Barlow
Linesmen:
(Canada) Joanie Duchesneau
(Canada) Sophie Thomson

Šuliková (Kapičáková, Hlinka) (PP) – 04:21	1–0
Halušková (Drábeková, Korenková) – 15:50	2–0
Blichová (Fančovičová, Janeková) – 34:24	3–0
Ištocyová (Šuliková, Hlinka) (PP) – 53:15	4–0

4 min
Penalties
8 min
75
Shots
7

1 April 2024; 19:30	Italy	2–3 (0–0, 1–1, 1–2)	Latvia	Volvo Sports Center, Riga; Attendance: 433

Game reference

Ilaria Girardi
Goalies
Kristiāna Apsīte
Referee:
(Italy) Anneke Orlandini
Linesmen:
(Australia) Bethany Bowshall
(Slovakia) Magdaléna Jonáková

	0–1	38:08 – A. Apsīte (Kubliņa, Miljone)
Abatangelo (Furlani, Gius) – 38:54	1–1
	1–2	53:39 – Yip-Chuck (Šilajāne, Rubīna)
	1–3	57:36 – Šilajāne (EN)
Niccolai (Roccella, Stocker) (EA) – 59:12	2–3

12 min
Penalties
6 min
44
Shots
30

3 April 2024; 12:30	Slovakia	7–1 (2–1, 4–0, 1–0)	Great Britain	Volvo Sports Center, Riga; Attendance: 168

Game reference

Andrea Risianova
Goalies
Nicole Jackson
Referee:
(Sweden) Maria Furberg
Linesmen:
(Australia) Bethany Bowshall
(Hungary) Zóra Gottlibet

Klimášová (Bednárik, Hlinka) – 01:51	1–0
Bednárik (Tóthová, Hlinka) – 08:15	2–0
	2–1	12:40 – Marsden (Sylvester, Harris) (PP)
Hlinka (Klimášová) – 21:35	3–1
Gálisová (Janeková, Tóthová) – 28:06	4–1
Beňáková (Drábeková, Blichová) – 29:35	5–1
Gálisová (Nemčeková, Dobiášová) – 38:52	6–1
Hlinka (Tóthová, Kapičáková) – 59:04	7–1

4 min
Penalties
6 min
46
Shots
32

3 April 2024; 16:30	Poland	1–2 (1–1, 0–0, 0–1)	Italy	Volvo Sports Center, Riga; Attendance: 122

Game reference

Martyna Sass
Goalies
Martina Fedel
Referee:
(Canada) Grace Barlow
Linesmen:
(Latvia) Baiba Dzene
(Canada) Sophie Thomson

Onyshchenko (Późniewska, Chrapek) – 04:36	1–0
	1–1	08:26 – Gius (Caumo, Lobis) (PP)
	1–2	47:49 – Niccolai (Stocker)

8 min
Penalties
14 min
30
Shots
42

3 April 2024; 19:30	Latvia	3–4 GWS (1–0, 2–3, 0–0) (OT: 0–0) (SO: 0–1)	Slovenia	Volvo Sports Center, Riga; Attendance: 675

Game reference

Kristiāna Apsīte
Goalies
Pia Dukarič
Referee:
(Italy) Anneke Orlandini
Linesmen:
(Canada) Joanie Duchesneau
(Slovakia) Magdaléna Jonáková

A. Apsīte (Lagzdina, Rulle) – 13:46	1–0
	1–1	21:42 – Pezdir (Blazinšek, Friš Lorber)
Lagzdina (Kezika, Želubovska) – 26:08	2–1
Miljone (Šilajāne, Yip-Chuck) – 30:42	3–1
	3–2	31:45 – Nylaander (Pren)
	3–3	39:52 – Vakaričič (Pren, Confidenti) (PP)

Miljone (miss)
Rulle
A. Apsīte (miss)
Yip-Chuck (miss)
Šilajāne (miss)
Miljone (miss)
Shootout
(miss) Nylaander
(miss) Blazinšek
Confidenti
(miss) Friš Lorber
(miss) Pren
Confidenti
8 min
Penalties
10 min
46
Shots
38

5 April 2024; 12:30	Italy	3–2 (0–1, 1–0, 2–1)	Slovakia	Volvo Sports Center, Riga; Attendance: 142

Game reference

Martina Fedel
Goalies
Andrea Rišianová
Referee:
(Finland) Reetta-Kaisa Lusi
Linesmen:
(Sweden) Ottilia Classon
(Canada) Joanie Duchesneau

	0–1	17:56 – Kubeková (Nemčeková, Šuliková) (PP)
Caumo (PP) – 31:48	1–1
	1–2	40:29 – Korenková (Drábeková)
Niccolai (Roccella, Lobis) – 54:58	2–2
Caumo (Lobis) – 59:30	3–2

6 min
Penalties
6 min
16
Shots
42

5 April 2024; 16:30	Slovenia	1–2 (0–0, 1–1, 0–1)	Great Britain	Volvo Sports Center, Riga; Attendance: 113

Game reference

Pia Dukarič
Goalies
Nicole Jackson
Referee:
(Canada) Grace Barlow
Linesmen:
(Australia) Bethany Bowshall
(Latvia) Baiba Dzene

Pren (Confidenti) – 27:08	1–0
	1–1	28:17 – Gale (Headland)
	1–2	50:40 – Alderson-Smith (Horwood) (PP)

8 min
Penalties
8 min
26
Shots
70

5 April 2024; 19:30	Poland	0–6 (0–1, 0–2, 0–3)	Latvia	Volvo Sports Center, Riga; Attendance: 875

Game reference

Martyna Sass
Goalies
Kristiāna Apsīte
Referee:
(Sweden) Maria Furberg
Linesmen:
(Hungary) Zóra Gottlibet
(Slovakia) Magdaléna Jonáková

0–1	10:34 – Yip-Chuck (Šilajāne)
0–2	26:50 – Šilajāne (Lukaševiča, Jokovleva) (PP)
0–3	39:06 – Miljone (Šilajāne, Yip-Chuck)
0–4	44:31 – Miljone (Šilajāne)
0–5	46:14 – Lagzdina (Kublina, A. Apsīte) (PP)
0–6	54:39 – Šilajāne (Miljone)

12 min
Penalties
10 min
52
Shots
31

6 April 2024; 12:30	Italy	6–1 (2–0, 2–0, 2–1)	Slovenia	Volvo Sports Center, Riga; Attendance: 112

Game reference

Martina Fedel
Goalies
Pia Dukarič
Referee:
(Sweden) Maria Furberg
Linesmen:
(Hungary) Zóra Gottlibet
(Canada) Sophie Thomson

Caumo (Stocker, Lobis) – 08:01	1–0
Mazzocchi (Saletta, Cereghini) – 19:31	2–0
Roccella (Stocker, Rohregger) (PP) – 34:27	3–0
Saletta (Mazzocchi, Lobis) – 35:42	4–0
	4–1	49:49 – Nylaander (Blazinšek, Glavič)
Lobis (EN) – 57:10	5–1
Bedont – 57:28	6–1

0 min
Penalties
6 min
52
Shots
15

6 April 2024; 16:30	Slovakia	5–1 (1–0, 3–1, 1–0)	Poland	Volvo Sports Center, Riga; Attendance: 116

Game reference

Andrea Rišianová
Goalies
Martyna Sass
Agata Kosińska-Horzelska
Referee:
(Italy) Anneke Orlandini
Linesmen:
(Australia) Bethany Bowshall
(Latvia) Baiba Dzene

Kubeková (Drábeková, Halušková) – 13:41	1–0
	1–1	20:10 – Sikorska (Zielińska, Onyshchenko)
Ištocyová (Šuliková, Halušková) (PP) – 27:02	2–1
Kubeková (Halušková, Korenková) – 28:10	3–1
Ištocyová (Nemčeková, Blichová) – 34:47	4–1
Blichová (Fančovičová, Bednárik) – 44:33	5–1

8 min
Penalties
8 min
50
Shots
23

6 April 2024; 19:30	Great Britain	2–3 (1–1, 1–1, 0–1)	Latvia	Volvo Sports Center, Riga; Attendance: 1,029

Game reference

Nicole Jackson
Goalies
Kristiāna Apsīte
Referee:
(Canada) Grace Barlow
Linesmen:
(Sweden) Ottilia Classon
(Canada) Joanie Duchesneau

Saunders (Traill, Towns) – 02:20	1–0
	1–1	17:34 – Jokovleva (Yip-Chuck, Miljone) (PP)
	1–2	33:58 – Miljone (PS)
Marsden (Harris, Alderson-Smith) – 34:46	2–2
	2–3	43:50 – Rulle (Kublina, A. Apsīte) (PP)

14 min
Penalties
8 min
51
Shots
31

=== Statistics ===
==== Scoring leaders ====
List shows the top skaters sorted by points, then goals.

Player	GP	G	A	Pts	+/−	PIM	POS
(Latvia) Karīna Šilajāne	5	3	6	9	+1	6	F
(Slovakia) Janka Hlinka	5	3	5	8	+8	0	F
(Latvia) Līga Miljone	5	4	3	7	+6	2	F
(Latvia) Krista Yip-Chuck	5	2	4	6	0	2	F
(Italy) Laura Lobis	5	1	5	6	+4	6	D
(Slovakia) Laura Šuliková	5	1	5	6	+6	0	D
(Slovakia) Tatiana Blichová	5	3	2	5	+4	0	F
(Slovakia) Barbora Kapičáková	5	2	3	5	+7	0	F
(Slovenia) Pia Pren	5	2	3	5	–1	4	F
(Slovakia) Ema Tóthová	5	2	3	5	+7	0	F

GP = Games played; G = Goals; A = Assists; Pts = Points; +/− = Plus/Minus; PIM = Penalties in Minutes; POS = Position
Source: IIHF.com

==== Goaltending leaders ====
Only the top five goaltenders, based on save percentage, who have played at least 40% of their team's minutes, are included in this list.

Player	TOI	GA	GAA	SA	Sv%	SO
(Italy) Martina Fedel	238:51	5	1.26	117	95.73	0
(Slovenia) Pia Dukarič	302:35	15	2.97	308	95.13	0
(Latvia) Kristiāna Apsīte	305:00	14	2.75	235	94.04	1
(Slovakia) Andrea Rišianová	299:48	6	1.20	99	93.94	1
(United Kingdom) Nicole Jackson	300:19	14	2.80	176	92.05	1

TOI = time on ice (minutes:seconds); SA = shots against; GA = goals against; GAA = goals against average; Sv% = save percentage; SO = shutouts
Source: IIHF.com

=== Awards ===
Position	Player
Goaltender	(Slovenia) Pia Dukarič
Defenceman	(Italy) Laura Lobis
Forward	(Slovakia) Janka Hlinka
