= Léa Berger =

French ice hockey player (born 2003)

- Born: October 29, 2003 (age 22) Mulhouse, France
- Height: 1.77 m (5 ft 10 in)
- Weight: 63 kg (139 lb; 9 st 13 lb)
- Position: Defense
- Shoots: Right
- RSEQ team: Montreal Carabins
- National team: France
- Playing career: 2018–present

Léa Berger (born 29 October 2003) is a French ice hockey player who plays as a defenceman for the Montreal Carabins in the RSEQ. She has represented France internationally, including at the IIHF Women's World Championship.

Berger was selected to represent France at the women's ice hockey tournament at the 2026 Winter Olympics.

== Playing career ==
Berger moved to Canada in 2022 to play for the Patriotes de Saint-Laurent in the RSEQ collegiate circuit. In 2024, she joined the Université de Montréal to play for the Carabins at the U Sports level.

== Personal life ==
Berger's player profile with the Carabins lists her hometown as Sanchey, France, and her programme of study as kinesiology at the Université de Montréal.

== Career statistics ==
=== Regular season and playoffs ===
			Regular season					Playoffs
Season	Team	League	GP	G	A	Pts	PIM	GP	G	A	Pts	PIM
2022–23	Patriotes de Saint-Laurent	RSEQ Collégial (F)	27	0	2	2	20	2	0	1	1	4
2023–24	Patriotes de Saint-Laurent	RSEQ Collégial (F)	29	0	0	0	16	—	—	—	—	—
2024–25	Université de Montréal	RSEQ (U Sports)	9	0	0	0	2	2	0	0	0	0
2025–26	Université de Montréal	RSEQ (U Sports)	15	0	0	0	4	—	—	—	—	—

=== International ===
Year	Team	Event	Result	GP	G	A	Pts	PIM
2020	France	U18 (Div I)	4th	5	0	0	0	0
2023	France	WC	10th	4	0	0	0	4
2024	France	WC (Div I-A)	3rd place, bronze medalist(s)	5	0	0	0	0
2025	France	WC (Div I-A)	4th	5	0	0	0	0
2026	France	Olympics	10th	4	0	0	0	0
