= Sanni Ahola =

Finnish ice hockey player (born 2000)

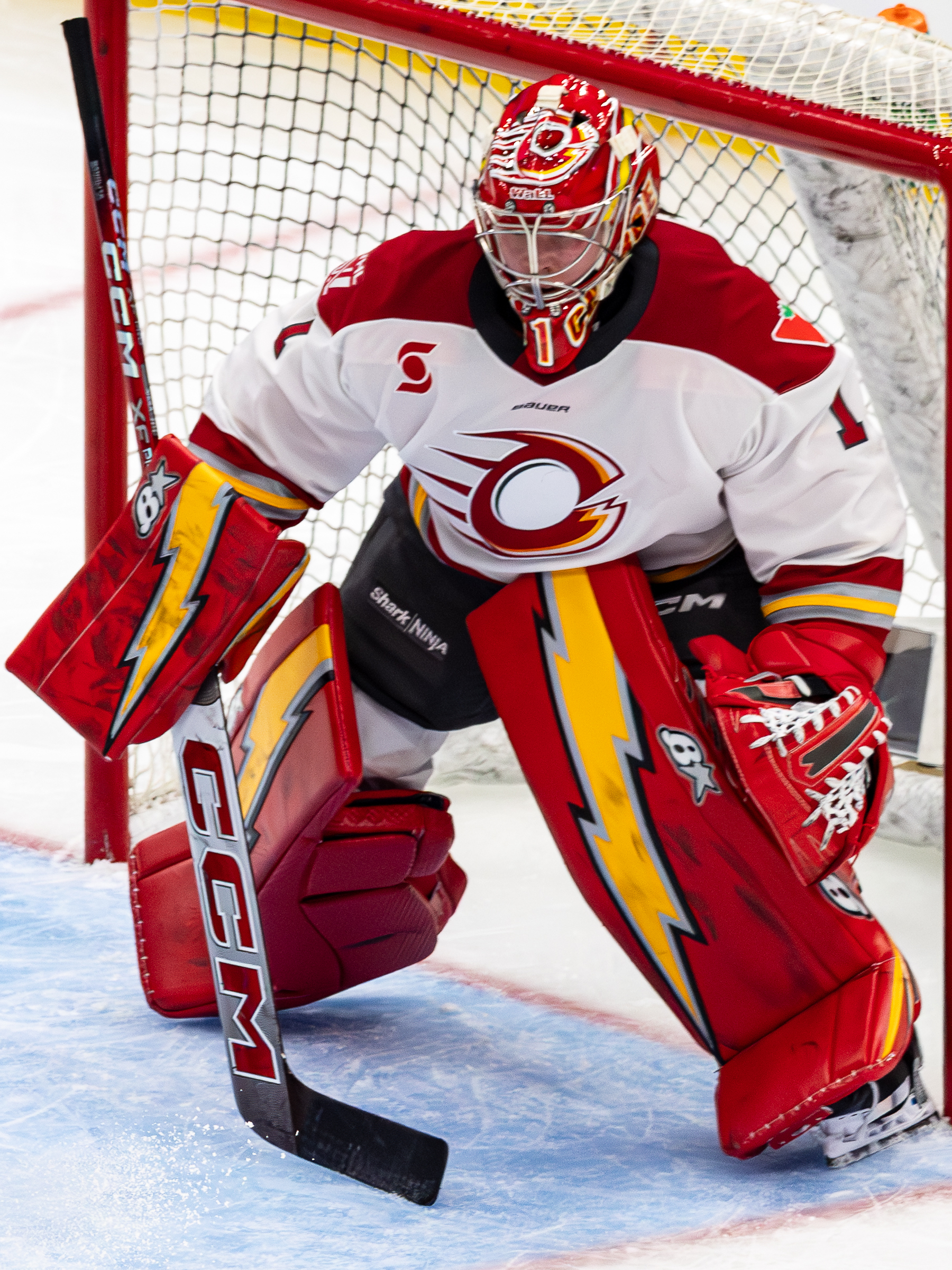
- Ahola with the Ottawa Charge in 2025
- Born: 3 June 2000 (age 26) Helsinki, Finland
- Height: 1.71 m (5 ft 7 in)
- Weight: 81 kg (179 lb; 12 st 11 lb)
- Position: Goaltender
- Catches: Left
- PWHL team Former teams: Ottawa Charge; IFK Helsinki
- National team: Finland
- Playing career: 2018–present
Medal record
World Championship
Bronze medal – third place	2024 United States
Bronze medal – third place	2025 Czechia

Sanni Ahola (born 3 June 2000) is a Finnish ice hockey goaltender for the Ottawa Charge of the Professional Women's Hockey League (PWHL) and a member of the Finnish national team.

== Playing career ==
Ahola developed on the minor ice hockey teams of Red Wings Helsinki, a youth ice hockey club in the Malmi neighborhood of Helsinki. She played as a defenseman and in goal throughout her childhood but committed to the pursuit of goaltending by age thirteen.

During her early teens, she served as goaltender with several boys' teams of Itä-Helsingin Kiekko (IHK) and was the starting net minder for the IHK boys' under-16 (U16) team during the 2014–15 season. In the following season, she split starts for IHK U17 in the U17 Mestis. In addition to backstopping IHK teams, she continued to play as both a skater and goaltender with Red Wing girls' teams.

When Saara Niemi established the new HIFK Naiset team in 2018, Ahola was one of the first players she named to the team. HIFK's inaugural season was an historic success that culminated in the team's promotion to the Naisten Liiga (NSML), the premier national league in Finland. Ahola maintained a .957 (95.7%) save percentage across seventeen Naisten Mestis games, improving to .967 across five games in the post-season Naisten Liiga qualification series.

Entering the 2019–20 season, she remained HIFK's number one goaltender as the team recruited a number of new players, including Karoliina Rantamäki, French national team players Athéna Locatelli and Emmanuelle Passard, and future Finnish national team player Krista Parkkonen. Ahola achieved a .915 (91.5%) save percentage in 21 games and helped the team secure a playoff berth in their first full Naisten Liiga season.

=== NCAA ===
By Ahola's own assessment, the 2021–22 season "didn't go exactly as [she] would have liked." The team struggled overall, amassing a 9–23–3 record with a win percentage of .300 (30%), and Ahola's game was not immune to the collective slump. Deployed in a goaltending tandem with Polusny, she played in eighteen games and recorded a .900 save percentage (90%), 3.75 GAA, and chartered a 5–13–0 record.

Ahead of the 2022–23 season, Brian Idalski was named head coach of the Huskies program and Finnish Olympian Mira Jalosuo was hired as the assistant coach overseeing defense. The coaching staff was the catalyst for a "really big change in the team" and Ahola was one of a number of players who had career years under the new regime. Highlights of her season included a shutout against the Bemidji State Beavers on 4 November and a 34-save performance in St. Cloud State's 4–1 victory over the Minnesota Golden Gophers on 7 November, the fourth win against Minnesota in program history. Her continued level of play across the remaining games of November 2022 resulted in her selection as the WCHA Goaltender of the Month and as the St. Cloud State University (SCSU) Athletics Female Athlete of the Month.

=== PWHL ===
Ahola was drafted in the fifth round, 37th overall, by the Ottawa Charge in the 2025 PWHL Draft. On 14 July 2025, she signed a one-year contract with the Charge for the 2025–26 season.

She recorded her first PWHL win in the Halifax Takeover Series on January 11, 2025, for the Ottawa Charge against the Boston Fleet. Ottawa won 2–1 in a shootout.

== International play ==
Ahola was a member of the Finnish national under-18 ice hockey team during 2015 to 2019. She served as backup goaltender to Jenna Silvonen at the 2017 IIHF U18 Women's World Championship and played the preliminary round match against Czechia, recording a .909 (90.9%) save percentage and 2.95 GAA as Finland lost the march 2–3 in overtime.

At the 2018 IIHF U18 Women's World Championship, she recorded the best save percentage (.929/92.9%) and best goals against average (1.81) of all starters at the tournament, and was selected as one of the top-three players for Finland by the coaches.

She made her debut with the Finnish national team in the second tournament of the 2022–23 Women's Euro Hockey Tour, a 5-nations tournament in Ängelholm, Sweden. Starting in two matches, she notched a win against Switzerland and posted a shutout against Germany.

Ahola was selected to the Finnish roster for the 2023 IIHF Women's World Championship on 20 March 2023, alongside goaltenders Anni Keisala and Emilia Kyrkkö.

On 2 January 2026, she was named to Finland's roster to compete at the 2026 Winter Olympics.

== Personal life ==
Ahola was born on 3 June 2000 to Riikka and Jukka Ahola in Helsinki, Finland. She attended the sports high school of the North Haaga Community School in the Haaga district of Helsinki.

She holds a degree in biology with a specialization in biodiversity, ecology and evolution from St. Cloud State University.

== Career statistics ==
=== Regular season and playoffs ===
			Regular season									Playoffs
Season	Team	League	GP	W	L	T	Min	GA	SO	SV%	GAA	GP	W	L	T	Min	GA	SO	SV%	GAA
2018-19	HIFK	NMestis	17	15	1	—	1023:33	18	5	95.7	1.05	—	—	—	—	—	—	—	—	—
2018-19	HIFK	NSML	—	—	—	—	—	—	—	—	—	5	4	0	–	275:40	4	1	96.6	0.87
2019-20	HIFK	NSML	17	5	10	—	1074:27	48	2	91.4	2.68	3	0	3	–	180:24	9	0	.922	2.99
2020-21	St. Cloud State Huskies	NCAA	10	3	5	1	541:07	28	2	91.8	3.11	—	—	—	—	—	—	—	—	—
2021-22	St. Cloud State Huskies	NCAA	18	5	13	0	1056:16	66	0	90.0	3.75	—	—	—	—	—	—	—	—	—
2022-23	St. Cloud State Huskies	NCAA	20	9	11	0	1128:03	47	1	92.3	2.50	—	—	—	—	—	—	—	—	—
2023-24	St. Cloud State Huskies	NCAA	17	10	6	1	1013:23	29	5	93.5	1.72	—	—	—	—	—	—	—	—	—
2024-25	St. Cloud State Huskies	NCAA	19	8	8	3	1108:00	41	2	92.7	1.93	—	—	—	—	—	—	—	—	—
2025-26	Ottawa Charge	PWHL	2	1	1	0	124:37	4	0	92.7	1.93	—	—	—	—	—	—	—	—	—
NCAA totals			84	35	43	5	4845:34	211	10	91.7	2.61	—	—	—	—	—	—	—	—	—
PWHL totals			2	1	1	0	124:37	4	0	92.7	1.93	—	—	—	—	—	—	—	—	—

=== International ===
Year	Team	Event	Result	GP	W	L	MIN	GA	SO	SV%	GAA
2017	Finland	U18	5th	1	0	1	61:02	3	0	90.9	2.95
2018	Finland	U18	5th	5	3	2	299:07	9	0	92.9	1.81
2023	Finland	WC	5th	3	3	0	179:39	2	1	95.7	0.67
2024	Finland	WC	3rd place, bronze medalist(s)	6	3	3	367:49	16	0	91.4	2.61
2025	Finland	WC	3rd place, bronze medalist(s)	4	3	1	244:27	14	0	85.4	3.44
2026	Finland	OG	6th	4	1	3	238:03	12	0	88.1	3.02
Junior totals				6	3	3	360:09	12	0	92.5	2.00
Senior totals				17	10	7	1029:58	44	1	87.7	2.56

== Awards and honors ==
Award	Year or Period
International
World U18 Top-3 Player on Team	2018
World Championship Bronze Medal	2024
World Championship Media All-Star	2024
World Championship Top-3 Player on Team	2024
College
WCHA All-Rookie Team	2020–21
WCHA Goaltender of the Month	November 2022
WCHA Goaltender of the Month	October 2023
WCHA Goaltender of the Month	December 2023
SCSU Athletics Female Athlete of the Month	November 2022
HCA National Goaltender of the Month	September/October 2023
HCA National Goaltender of the Month	December 2023
HCA National Goalie of the Year semifinalist	2023–24
All-WCHA First Team	2023–24
WCHA Goaltender of the Year	2023–24

== See also ==
- List of Finnish women in North American collegiate ice hockey
