= 2023 IIHF Women's World Championship =

2023 edition of the IIHF Women's World Championship

Tournament details
- Host country: Canada
- City: Brampton
- Venue: 1 (in 1 host city)
- Dates: 5–16 April
- Opened by: Mary Simon
- Teams: 10

Final positions
- Champions: United States (10th title)
- Runners-up: Canada
- Third place: Czechia
- Fourth place: Switzerland

Tournament statistics
- Games played: 31
- Goals scored: 194 (6.26 per game)
- Attendance: 59,372 (1,915 per game)
- Scoring leader: (United States) Caroline Harvey (14 points)

Awards
- MVP: (Canada) Sarah Fillier

Official website
- www.iihf.com

The 2023 IIHF Women's World Championship was the 22nd edition of the Top Division of the Women's Ice Hockey World Championship organized by the International Ice Hockey Federation (IIHF). The tournament was contested in Brampton, Canada from 5 to 16 April 2023 at the CAA Centre.

The United States won their tenth title, after defeating Canada 6–3 in the final, while Czechia captured bronze over Switzerland.

== Format ==
The top five teams from the previous tournament were placed in Group A and the teams that finished sixth through ninth in the 2022 tournament, plus France, which was promoted after the 2022 tournament, were placed in Group B. All of the teams in Group A and the top three teams from Group B continued to the knockout phase, while the bottom two teams from Group B were relegated. During the knockout stage, there was a re-seeding after the quarterfinals.

== Venue ==
Brampton
CAA Centre
Capacity: 5,000
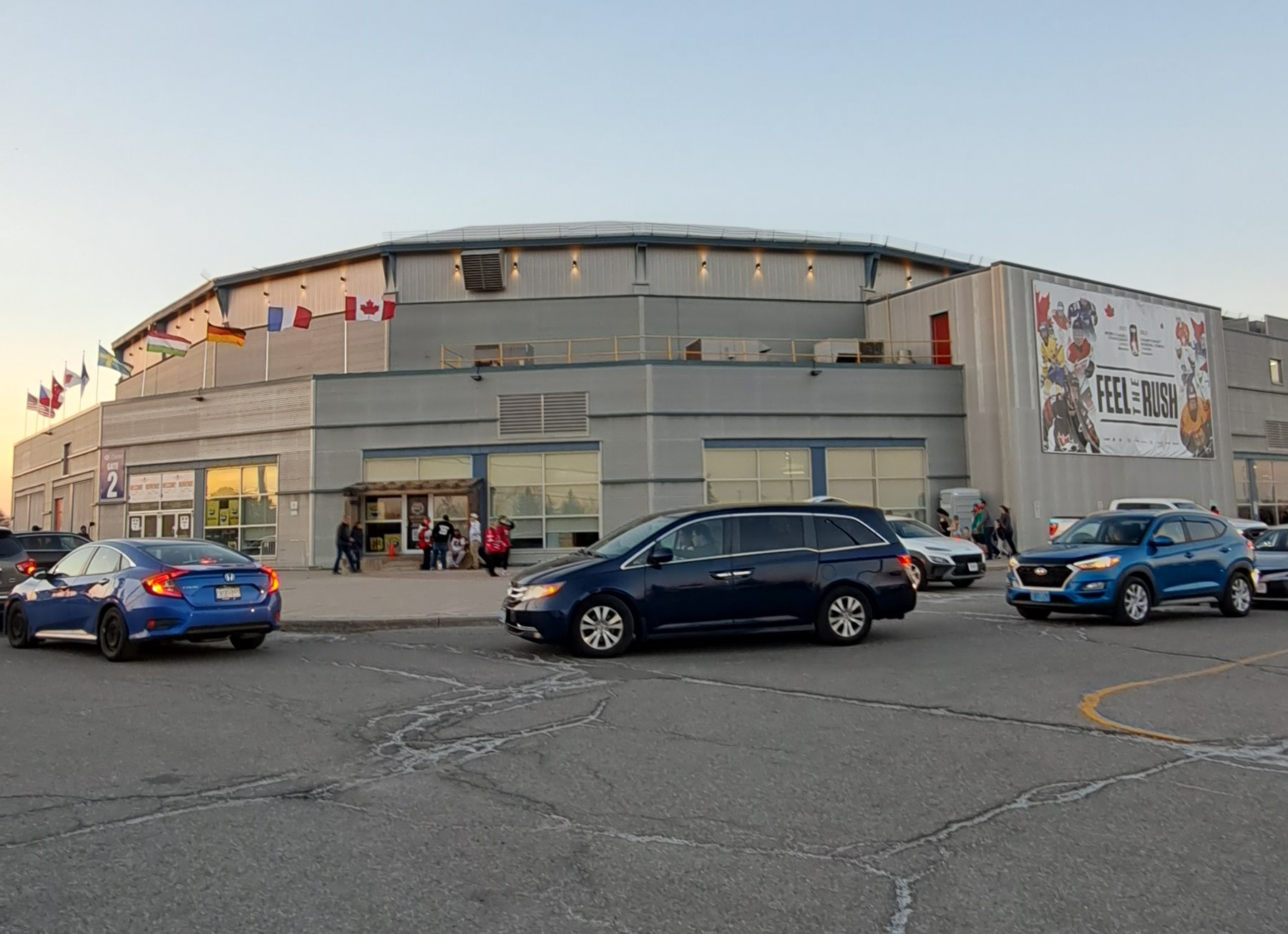

== Participating teams ==
Group A

- Canada
- United States
- Czechia
- Switzerland
- Japan

Group B

- Finland
- Sweden
- Hungary
- Germany
- France – Promoted from Division I Group A in 2022

== Rosters ==
Each team's roster consisted of at least 15 skaters (forwards and defencemen) and two goaltenders and at most 20 skaters and three goaltenders. All ten participating nations, through the confirmation of their respective national associations, had to submit a "Long List" roster no later than two weeks before the tournament.

== Match officials ==
Twelve referees and twelve linesmen were selected for the tournament.

Referees	Linesmen
(Austria) Julia Kainberger; (Canada) Brandy Dewar; (Canada) Cianna Lieffers; (Canada) Elizabeth Mantha; (Canada) Shauna Neary; (Finland) Anniina Nurmi; (Germany) Tijana Haack; (Latvia) Agnese Kārkliņa; (United States) Kelly Cooke; (United States) Samantha Hiller; (United States) Chelsea Rapin; (United States) Amanda Tassoni	(Canada) Jessica Chartrand; (Canada) Justine Todd; (Canada) Erin Zach; (Czech Republic) Kamila Smetková; (Finland) Tiina Saarimäki; (United Kingdom) Amy Lack; (Hungary) Zóra Gottlibet; (Slovakia) Magdalena Jonáková; (Sweden) Anna Hammar; (United States) Sarah Buckner; (United States) Jennifer Cameron; (United States) Erika Greenen

== Preliminary round ==
The groups were based on the final rankings from the previous tournament.

All times are local (Eastern Time Zone – UTC−4).

=== Group A ===
Pos	Team	Pld	W	OTW	OTL	L	GF	GA	GD	Pts	Qualification
1	Canada (H)	4	3	1	0	0	18	4	+14	11	Quarterfinals
2	United States	4	3	0	1	0	25	8	+17	10	Quarterfinals
3	Czechia	4	1	1	0	2	10	14	−4	5	Quarterfinals
4	Switzerland	4	1	0	0	3	7	21	−14	3	Quarterfinals
5	Japan	4	0	0	1	3	5	18	−13	1	Quarterfinals

Source: IIHF
Rules for classification: 1) points; 2) head-to-head points; 3) head-to-head goal difference; 4) head-to-head number of goals scored; 5) result against closest best-ranked team outside tied teams; 6) result against second-best ranked team outside tied teams; 7) seeding before tournament.
(H) Host

5 April 2023; 15:00	United States	7–1 (2–1, 2–0, 3–0)	Japan	CAA Centre, Brampton; Attendance: 894

Game reference

Aerin Frankel
Goalies
Miyuu Masuhara
Riko Kawaguchi
Referees:
(Latvia) Agnese Kārkliņa
(Canada) Cianna Lieffers
Linesmen:
(Finland) Tiina Saarimäki
(Canada) Justine Todd

	0–1	08:14 – Toko (Koyama)
Keller (Heise, Janecke) – 09:29	1–1
Carpenter (Barnes, Knight) (PP) – 14:44	2–1
Carpenter (Kessel, Knight) – 21:52	3–1
Heise (Guilday, Harvey) – 22:43	4–1
Bilka (Harvey, Winn) – 45:07	5–1
Murphy – 54:16	6–1
Knight (Winn, Carpenter) – 57:09	7–1

4 min
Penalties
4 min
58
Shots
13

5 April 2023; 19:00	Canada	4–0 (2–0, 1–0, 1–0)	Switzerland	CAA Centre, Brampton; Attendance: 3,510

Game reference

Ann-Renée Desbiens
Goalies
Andrea Brändli
Referees:
(Finland) Anniina Nurmi
(United States) Amanda Tassoni
Linesmen:
(Hungary) Zóra Gottlibet
(United States) Erika Greenen

Spooner – 11:42	1–0
Nurse (Ambrose, Fillier) (PP) – 14:27	2–0
Johnston (Rattray, Spooner) (PP) – 21:44	3–0
Fillier (Nurse) – 54:07	4–0

12 min
Penalties
14 min
49
Shots
12

6 April 2023; 15:00	Japan	1–2 OT (0–1, 0–0, 1–0) (OT: 0–1)	Czechia	CAA Centre, Brampton; Attendance: 568

Game reference

Miyuu Masuhara
Goalies
Blanka Škodová
Referees:
(United States) Kelly Cooke
(United States) Chelsea Rapin
Linesmen:
(Czech Republic) Kamila Smetková
(Canada) Erin Zach

	0–1	19:23 – Pejšová (Přibylová, Neubauerová)
Ukita (Toko) – 43:14	1–1
	1–2	63:16 – Mrázová (Neubauerová, Lásková) (EA)

2 min
Penalties
2 min
17
Shots
28

7 April 2023; 11:00	Switzerland	1–9 (0–4, 0–2, 1–3)	United States	CAA Centre, Brampton; Attendance: 2,227

Game reference

Saskia Maurer
Goalies
Nicole Hensley
Referees:
(United States) Samantha Hiller
(Austria) Julia Kainberger
Linesmen:
(United States) Jennifer Cameron
(Canada) Jessica Chartrand

	0–1	00:07 – Murphy (Roque)
	0–2	15:19 – Harvey (Heise) (PP)
	0–3	15:42 – Bilka (Heise)
	0–4	16:56 – Gilmore (Hughes, Murphy)
	0–5	28:23 – Roque (Murphy)
	0–6	38:04 – Kessel (Heise, Barnes)
	0–7	47:45 – Harvey (Roque, Janecke) (PP)
Enzler (Müller, Stalder) (PP) – 50:27	1–7
	1–8	55:00 – Barnes (Carpenter, Knight) (PP)
	1–9	59:31 – Hughes (Barnes, Roque)

10 min
Penalties
27 min
13
Shots
54

7 April 2023; 19:00	Czechia	1–5 (1–2, 0–1, 0–2)	Canada	CAA Centre, Brampton; Attendance: 4,036

Game reference

Blanka Škodová
Goalies
Ann-Renée Desbiens
Referees:
(Canada) Brandy Dewar
(Canada) Shauna Neary
Linesmen:
(Sweden) Anna Hammar
(United Kingdom) Amy Lack

	0–1	08:03 – Poulin (Turnbull, Jenner)
Mlýnková – 18:27	1–1
	1–2	18:52 – Fast (Larocque, Turnbull)
	1–3	38:57 – Turnbull (Larocque, Clark)
	1–4	42:16 – Poulin (Jenner)
	1–5	54:40 – Stacey (Turnbull, Shelton)

12 min
Penalties
10 min
15
Shots
42

8 April 2023; 19:00	Japan	0–5 (0–2, 0–2, 0–1)	Canada	CAA Centre, Brampton; Attendance: 3,755

Game reference

Miyuu Masuhara
Riko Kawaguchi
Goalies
Emerance Maschmeyer
Referees:
(Germany) Tijana Haack
(Canada) Elizabeth Mantha
Linesmen:
(United States) Sarah Buckner
(Slovakia) Magdalena Jonáková

0–1	03:56 – Jenner (Poulin, Ambrose)
0–2	08:03 – Fillier (Fast, Nurse)
0–3	23:34 – Nurse (Ambrose, Poulin) (PP)
0–4	38:35 – Spooner (Rattray, Fillier)
0–5	56:41 – Fillier (Serdachny, Turnbull)

4 min
Penalties
8 min
11
Shots
60

9 April 2023; 15:00	United States	6–2 (2–2, 2–0, 2–0)	Czechia	CAA Centre, Brampton; Attendance: 2,149

Game reference

Aerin Frankel
Goalies
Blanka Škodová
Referees:
(Canada) Elizabeth Mantha
(Finland) Anniina Nurmi
Linesmen:
(United States) Jennifer Cameron
(United Kingdom) Amy Lack

Keller (Murphy) – 06:27	1–0
	1–1	07:59 – Křížová (Pejzlová, Vanišová) (PP)
	1–2	13:06 – Čajanová
Scamurra (Pannek, Harvey) – 16:11	2–2
Eden – 20:45	3–2
Janecke (Heise, Bilka) – 30:42	4–2
Knight (Carpenter, Harvey) – 41:22	5–2
Roque (SH) – 48:51	6–2

49 min
Penalties
8 min
29
Shots
24

10 April 2023; 15:00	Switzerland	4–3 (0–2, 2–1, 2–0)	Japan	CAA Centre, Brampton; Attendance: 1,101

Game reference

Andrea Brändli
Goalies
Riko Kawaguchi
Referees:
(Austria) Julia Kainberger
(United States) Amanda Tassoni
Linesmen:
(Sweden) Anna Hammar
(Finland) Tiina Saarimäki

	0–1	06:08 – Koyama (Toko, Hitosato)
	0–2	11:21 – Enomoto (Ito, Ukita) (PP)
Christen (Müller, Stalder) (PP) – 26:32	1–2
Vallario – 26:53	2–2
	2–3	34:26 – Ao. Shiga (Ak. Shiga, Noro)
Müller (Enzler, Baechler) – 47:57	3–3
Stalder (Müller, Vallario) – 50:54	4–3

6 min
Penalties
4 min
28
Shots
22

10 April 2023; 19:00	Canada	4–3 GWS (1–1, 1–0, 1–2) (OT: 0–0) (SO: 1–0)	United States	CAA Centre, Brampton; Attendance: 4,322

Game reference

Ann-Renée Desbiens
Goalies
Aerin Frankel
Referees:
(United States) Samantha Hiller
(Canada) Cianna Lieffers
Linesmen:
(United States) Sarah Buckner
(Canada) Justine Todd

	0–1	08:45 – Bilka (Roque, Janecke) (PP)
Fillier (Nurse, Zandee-Hart) – 12:38	1–1
Poulin (Ambrose, Fillier) (PP2) – 23:08	2–1
Stacey (Clark, Thompson) (ENG) – 57:33	3–1
	3–2	59:21 – Knight (Harvey, Heise) (EA)
	3–3	59:56 – Kessel (Bilka, Heise) (EA)

Jenner
Fillier (miss)
Poulin (miss)
Spooner (miss)
Nurse (miss)
Poulin (miss)
Jenner (miss)
Fillier (miss)
Rattray
Shootout
Knight
(miss) Harvey
(miss) Heise
(miss) Carpenter
(miss) Kessel
(miss) Knight
(miss) Heise
(miss) Bilka
(miss) Knight
14 min
Penalties
10 min
37
Shots
29

11 April 2023; 19:00	Czechia	5–2 (3–0, 1–0, 1–2)	Switzerland	CAA Centre, Brampton; Attendance: 1,119

Game reference

Blanka Škodová
Goalies
Saskia Maurer
Caroline Spies
Referees:
(United States) Kelly Cooke
(Germany) Tijana Haack
Linesmen:
(Canada) Jessica Chartrand
(Canada) Erin Zach

Šapovalivová (Mlýnková) – 00:52	1–0
Pejzlová (Čajanová, Vanišová) – 13:26	2–0
Mills (Pejšová, Lásková) – 19:00	3–0
Hymlarová (Neubauerová, Lásková) (PP) – 39:08	4–0
	4–1	40:29 – Stalder (Enzler, Christen)
Pištěková (Plosová, Mills) – 42:04	5–1
	5–2	50:08 – Müller (Stalder, Enzler)

4 min
Penalties
8 min
35
Shots
15

=== Group B ===
Pos	Team	Pld	W	OTW	OTL	L	GF	GA	GD	Pts	Qualification or relegation
1	Finland	4	4	0	0	0	26	3	+23	12	Quarterfinals
2	Germany	4	3	0	0	1	11	6	+5	9	Quarterfinals
3	Sweden	4	2	0	0	2	18	14	+4	6	Quarterfinals
4	Hungary	4	1	0	0	3	7	15	−8	3	Relegated to the 2024 Division I A
5	France	4	0	0	0	4	5	29	−24	0	Relegated to the 2024 Division I A

Source: IIHF
Rules for classification: 1) points; 2) head-to-head points; 3) head-to-head goal difference; 4) head-to-head number of goals scored; 5) result against closest best-ranked team outside tied teams; 6) result against second-best ranked team outside tied teams; 7) seeding before tournament.

5 April 2023; 11:00	France	1–14 (0–6, 1–3, 0–5)	Finland	CAA Centre, Brampton; Attendance: 705

Game reference

Margaux Mameri
Caroline Lambert
Goalies
Sanni Ahola
Referees:
(Austria) Julia Kainberger
(Canada) Shauna Neary
Linesmen:
(United States) Jennifer Cameron
(United Kingdom) Amy Lack

	0–1	05:19 – Nieminen (Liikala) (SH)
	0–2	06:03 – Nylund (Sundelin, Rantala) (SH)
	0–3	08:27 – Vesa (Sundelin, Karjalainen)
	0–4	15:37 – Vesa (Laitinen, Hiirikoski)
	0–5	16:33 – Tulus (Savolainen, Rantala)
	0–6	18:04 – Liikala (Vanhanen, Nieminen)
Duvin (Aurard) – 20:36	1–6
	1–7	21:53 – Nylund (Parkkonen, Karjalainen)
	1–8	23:51 – Lindstedt (Parkkonen, Yrjänen)
	1–9	30:41 – Laitinen (Hiirikoski, Nieminen)
	1–10	42:34 – Vainikka (Liikala, Vanhanen)
	1–11	48:32 – Vainikka (Savolainen, Tulus)
	1–12	51:57 – Nieminen (Laitinen, Vainikka)
	1–13	56:08 – Nylund (Laitinen, Vanhanen) (PP)
	1–14	58:38 – Savolainen (Vainikka, Tulus)

6 min
Penalties
4 min
12
Shots
53

6 April 2023; 11:00	Germany	6–2 (1–1, 3–1, 2–0)	Sweden	CAA Centre, Brampton; Attendance: 1,021

Game reference

Sandra Abstreiter
Goalies
Emma Söderberg
Referees:
(Germany) Tijana Haack
(United States) Samantha Hiller
Linesmen:
(Canada) Jessica Chartrand
(Slovakia) Magdalena Jonáková

	0–1	00:10 – Svensson
Feldmeier (Strobel, Haider) (PP) – 18:15	1–1
Kluge (Welcke, Weidenfelder) – 24:47	2–1
Haider (Wagner, Karpf) – 25:31	3–1
	3–2	25:50 – Svensson
Voigt (Jobst-Smith, Haider) – 33:05	4–2
Haider (Wagner, Karpf) – 47:21	5–2
Feldmeier (Strobel, Botthof) (EN) – 55:07	6–2

2 min
Penalties
6 min
28
Shots
33

6 April 2023; 19:00	France	2–4 (0–2, 0–1, 2–1)	Hungary	CAA Centre, Brampton; Attendance: 1,072

Game reference

Caroline Lambert
Goalies
Anikó Németh
Referees:
(Canada) Brandy Dewar
(Canada) Elizabeth Mantha
Linesmen:
(United States) Sarah Buckner
(Sweden) Anna Hammar

	0–1	05:46 – Huszák (Metzler, Kiss-Simon)
	0–2	11:41 – Metzler (Kiss-Simon, Mayer) (PP)
	0–3	37:50 – Huszák (Dabasi)
Duvin (Rozier, Väänänen) – 42:59	1–3
Locatelli (Duvin, Baudrit) (PP) – 48:07	2–3
	2–4	52:40 – Dabasi (Huszák, Kiss-Simon) (PP)

31 min
Penalties
6 min
34
Shots
32

7 April 2023; 15:00	Finland	3–0 (2–0, 1–0, 0–0)	Germany	CAA Centre, Brampton; Attendance: 1,532

Game reference

Anni Keisala
Goalies
Johanna May
Referees:
(Latvia) Agnese Kārkliņa
(United States) Amanda Tassoni
Linesmen:
(Hungary) Zóra Gottlibet
(Canada) Justine Todd

Lindstedt (Nieminen, Hiirikoski) (PP) – 13:18	1–0
Vesa (Sundelin, Nylund) – 15:59	2–0
Vainikka (Laitinen, Hiirikoski) – 28:39	3–0

4 min
Penalties
4 min
43
Shots
16

8 April 2023; 11:00	Sweden	6–2 (4–2, 1–0, 1–0)	Hungary	CAA Centre, Brampton; Attendance: 1,337

Game reference

Sara Grahn
Goalies
Anikó Németh
Zsuzsa Révész
Referees:
(Canada) Cianna Lieffers
(Finland) Anniina Nurmi
Linesmen:
(United States) Erika Greenen
(Finland) Tiina Saarimäki

Ljungblom (Svensson, Kjellbin) – 03:00	1–0
Ljungblom (Svensson, Olsson) – 06:13	2–0
	2–1	07:27 – Seregély (Gasparics)
	2–2	08:57 – Dabasi (Huszák, Mayer) (PP)
Ljungblom (Svensson, Nylén Persson) (PP) – 13:08	3–2
Andersson (Thuvik, Jungåker) – 14:58	4–2
Ljungblom (Olsson) – 24:44	5–2
Svensson (Nylén Persson, Olsson) (PP) – 51:54	6–2

14 min
Penalties
6 min
28
Shots
29

9 April 2023; 11:00	Finland	4–2 (0–0, 0–2, 4–0)	Sweden	CAA Centre, Brampton; Attendance: 1,919

Game reference

Anni Keisala
Goalies
Sara Grahn
Referees:
(Canada) Brandy Dewar
(United States) Chelsea Rapin
Linesmen:
(United States) Erika Greenen
(Czech Republic) Kamila Smetková

	0–1	21:08 – Thuvik (Hjalmarsson)
	0–2	38:59 – Jungåker (Kjellbin, Johansson) (PP)
Vainikka (Rantala, Tulus) – 43:42	1–2
Savolainen (Nieminen, Tulus) (PP) – 46:06	2–2
Nieminen (Liikala, Vanhanen) – 47:51	3–2
Savolainen (Tulus, Hiirikoski) (PP) – 58:34	4–2

4 min
Penalties
11 min
38
Shots
15

9 April 2023; 19:00	Germany	3–0 (1–0, 1–0, 1–0)	France	CAA Centre, Brampton; Attendance: 1,020

Game reference

Sandra Abstreiter
Goalies
Margaux Mameri
Referees:
(United States) Kelly Cooke
(Canada) Shauna Neary
Linesmen:
(Hungary) Zóra Gottlibet
(Canada) Erin Zach

Haider (Strobel, Feldmeier) (PP) – 15:49	1–0
Eisenschmid – 20:28	2–0
Jobst-Smith (Kluge, Eisenschmid) (PP) – 50:39	3–0

10 min
Penalties
10 min
26
Shots
28

10 April 2023; 11:00	Hungary	0–5 (0–1, 0–3, 0–1)	Finland	CAA Centre, Brampton; Attendance: 1,073

Game reference

Anikó Németh
Zsuzsa Révész
Goalies
Sanni Ahola
Referees:
(Germany) Tijana Haack
(Latvia) Agnese Kārkliņa
Linesmen:
(United States) Jennifer Cameron
(Slovakia) Magdalena Jonáková

0–1	11:36 – Laitinen (Nieminen, Vanhanen)
0–2	22:12 – Hiirikoski (Tulus, Lindstedt) (PP)
0–3	36:15 – Nylund (Vanhanen, Vainikka) (PP)
0–4	36:21 – Vesa (Sundelin)
0–5	59:47 – Savolainen (Rantala, Yrjänen)

8 min
Penalties
2 min
15
Shots
36

11 April 2023; 11:00	Hungary	1–2 (0–2, 1–0, 0–0)	Germany	CAA Centre, Brampton; Attendance: 1,232

Game reference

Anikó Németh
Goalies
Sandra Abstreiter
Referees:
(Canada) Shauna Neary
(United States) Chelsea Rapin
Linesmen:
(United States) Erika Greenen
(Czech Republic) Kamila Smetková

	0–1	10:34 – Hark (Delarbre, Jobst-Smith)
	0–2	19:25 – Eisenschmid (Feldmeier)
Dabasi (Odnoga) – 20:49	1–2

2 min
Penalties
6 min
37
Shots
26

11 April 2023; 15:00	Sweden	8–2 (3–0, 4–0, 1–2)	France	CAA Centre, Brampton; Attendance: 702

Game reference

Emma Söderberg
Goalies
Caroline Lambert
Margaux Mameri
Referees:
(Latvia) Agnese Kārkliņa
(Finland) Anniina Nurmi
Linesmen:
(Slovakia) Magdalena Jonáková
(United Kingdom) Amy Lack

Olsson (Ljungblom, Holmgren) – 06:49	1–0
Lundin (Olsson, Nylén Persson) (PP) – 09:22	2–0
Olsson (Ljungblom) – 18:27	3–0
Olsson (Svensson, Nylén Persson) (PP) – 26:02	4–0
Ljungblom (Lundin, Nylén Persson) (PP) – 29:12	5–0
Olsson (Ljungblom, Jungåker) – 33:17	6–0
Ljungblom (Svensson, Olsson) – 35:53	7–0
Svensson (Olsson, Lundin) (PP) – 45:38	8–0
	8–1	48:43 – Barbirati (Le Scodan, Desvignes)
	8–2	50:05 – Baudrit (Duvin, Rozier) (PP)

10 min
Penalties
14 min
48
Shots
24

== Knockout stage ==
There was a re-seeding after the quarterfinals.

Rank	Team	Grp	Pos	Pts	GD	GF	Seed
1	Canada	A	1	11	+14	18	2
2	United States	A	2	10	+17	25	1
3	Czechia	A	3	5	−4	10	6
4	Switzerland	A	4	3	−14	7	4
5	Japan	A	5	1	−13	5	7
6	Finland	B	1	12	+23	26	3
7	Germany	B	2	9	+5	11	10
8	Sweden	B	3	6	+4	18	8

=== Bracket ===
Quarter-finals
13 April
A1 Canada (OT)	3
B3 Sweden	2
13 April
A2 United States	3
B2 Germany	0
13 April
A3 Czechia	2
B1 Finland	1
13 April
A4 Switzerland	5
A5 Japan	1

Semi-finals
15 April
1 Canada	5
4 Switzerland	1
15 April
2 United States	9
3 Czechia	1

Final
16 April
1 Canada	3
2 United States	6
Third place
16 April
3 Czechia	3
4 Switzerland	2

=== Quarterfinals ===
13 April 2023; 10:00	Czechia	2–1 (0–1, 2–0, 0–0)	Finland	CAA Centre, Brampton; Attendance: 1,034

Game reference

Blanka Škodová
Goalies
Anni Keisala
Referees:
(Canada) Cianna Lieffers
(United States) Chelsea Rapin
Linesmen:
(Sweden) Anna Hammar
(Canada) Justine Todd

	0–1	15:18 – Vainikka (Tulus, Laitinen)
Mlýnková (Křížová, Mrázová) (PP) – 26:46	1–1
Mrázová (Tejralová, Čajanová) – 27:35	2–1

10 min
Penalties
8 min
22
Shots
42

13 April 2023; 13:30	United States	3–0 (1–0, 1–0, 1–0)	Germany	CAA Centre, Brampton; Attendance: 1,375

Game reference

Aerin Frankel
Goalies
Sandra Abstreiter
Referees:
(Canada) Elizabeth Mantha
(Canada) Shauna Neary
Linesmen:
(Canada) Jessica Chartrand
(Hungary) Zóra Gottlibet

Kessel (Harvey, Carpenter) (PP) – 19:05	1–0
Bilka (Winn, Roque) (PP) – 32:39	2–0
Murphy (Scamurra, Stecklein) (SH) – 47:56	3–0

10 min
Penalties
6 min
52
Shots
18

13 April 2023; 17:00	Canada	3–2 OT (1–0, 1–1, 0–1) (OT: 1–0)	Sweden	CAA Centre, Brampton; Attendance: 4,019

Game reference

Emerance Maschmeyer
Goalies
Emma Söderberg
Referees:
(Germany) Tijana Haack
(United States) Amanda Tassoni
Linesmen:
(United States) Erika Greenen
(Czech Republic) Kamila Smetková

Turnbull (Fast) – 08:20	1–0
Nurse (Ambrose, Jenner) (PP) – 33:01	2–0
	2–1	38:37 – Ljungblom (Svensson, Nylén Persson) (PP)
	2–2	59:50 – Svensson (Nylén Persson, Jungåker) (EA)
Nurse (Fillier, Larocque) – 64:26	3–2

8 min
Penalties
8 min
54
Shots
14

13 April 2023; 20:30	Switzerland	5–1 (1–1, 3–0, 1–0)	Japan	CAA Centre, Brampton; Attendance: 1,344

Game reference

Andrea Brändli
Goalies
Miyuu Masuhara
Riko Kawaguchi
Referees:
(Austria) Julia Kainberger
(Finland) Anniina Nurmi
Linesmen:
(United States) Jennifer Cameron
(Canada) Erin Zach

	0–1	08:17 – Toko (Ukita, Seki)
Christen (Müller, Stalder) (PP) – 18:22	1–1
Müller (Stalder) – 20:29	2–1
Stalder (Enzler) – 24:26	3–1
Enzler (Stalder, Christen) – 26:10	4–1
Enzler (Müller, Stalder) (PP) – 48:29	5–1

4 min
Penalties
10 min
35
Shots
28

=== 5th–8th place semifinals ===
14 April 2023; 15:00	Finland	8–2 (1–1, 3–1, 4–0)	Germany	CAA Centre, Brampton; Attendance: 679

Game reference

Anni Keisala
Goalies
Sandra Abstreiter
Johanna May
Referees:
(United States) Kelly Cooke
(Canada) Brandy Dewar
Linesmen:
(Slovakia) Magdalena Jonáková
(Finland) Tiina Saarimäki

	0–1	10:17 – Weidenfelder (Feldmeier, Haider) (PP)
Nylund (Vesa, Sundelin) – 10:33	1–1
Nieminen (Hiirikoski, Savolainen) (PP) – 20:35	2–1
	2–2	21:49 – Wagner (Karpf, Hark)
Nieminen (Tulus) (PP) – 25:31	3–2
Nieminen (Hiirikoski, Laitinen) (EA) – 28:50	4–2
Liikala (Parkkonen, Nieminen) – 45:11	5–2
Hiirikoski (Laitinen) – 48:17	6–2
Vesa (Nylund, Rantala) – 49:19	7–2
Laitinen (Vainikka, Liikala) (PP) – 59:45	8–2

6 min
Penalties
8 min
41
Shots
22

14 April 2023; 19:00	Japan	0–1 (0–1, 0–0, 0–0)	Sweden	CAA Centre, Brampton; Attendance: 976

Game reference
Riko Kawaguchi	Goalies	Emma Söderberg	Referees: (United States) Samantha Hiller (Latvia) Agnese Kārkliņa; Linesmen: (United States) Sarah Buckner (Czech Republic) Kamila Smetková
0–1 / 09:06 – Bouveng (Lundin, Olsson)			Referees: (United States) Samantha Hiller (Latvia) Agnese Kārkliņa; Linesmen: (United States) Sarah Buckner (Czech Republic) Kamila Smetková
6 min	Penalties	12 min	Referees: (United States) Samantha Hiller (Latvia) Agnese Kārkliņa; Linesmen: (United States) Sarah Buckner (Czech Republic) Kamila Smetková
23	Shots	24	Referees: (United States) Samantha Hiller (Latvia) Agnese Kārkliņa; Linesmen: (United States) Sarah Buckner (Czech Republic) Kamila Smetková

=== Semifinals ===
15 April 2023; 12:00	United States	9–1 (1–0, 5–1, 3–0)	Czechia	CAA Centre, Brampton; Attendance: 2,663

Game reference

Aerin Frankel
Goalies
Blanka Škodová
Kateřina Zechovská
Referees:
(United States) Kelly Cooke
(Canada) Cianna Lieffers
Linesmen:
(Sweden) Anna Hammar
(Finland) Tiina Saarimäki

Kessel (Barnes, Harvey) (PP) – 11:30	1–0
Knight (Barnes, Roque) – 24:22	2–0
Knight (Harvey, Barnes (PP) – 25:57	3–0
Murphy (Harvey, Carpenter) – 28:13	4–0
	4–1	31:31 – Šapovalivová (Mrázová, Čajanová)
Roque (Heise, Winn) (PP) – 35:00	5–1
Kessel (Knight) – 38:19	6–1
Janecke (Heise, Bilka) – 42:50	7–1
Janecke (Heise, Winn) (PP) – 47:11	8–1
Harvey (Kessel) – 54:08	9–1

6 min
Penalties
10 min
45
Shots
15

15 April 2023; 16:00	Canada	5–1 (0–0, 2–0, 3–1)	Switzerland	CAA Centre, Brampton; Attendance: 4,235

Game reference

Ann-Renée Desbiens
Goalies
Andrea Brändli
Referees:
(United States) Samantha Hiller
(United States) Chelsea Rapin
Linesmen:
(United States) Jennifer Cameron
(Canada) Jessica Chartrand

Fillier (Nurse, Spooner) – 31:06	1–0
Fillier (Spooner) – 37:04	2–0
Rattray (Spooner, Thompson) (PP) – 43:48	3–0
Fillier (Ambrose, Maltais) – 55:04	4–0
	4–1	57:56 – Müller (Christen, Quennec) (PP2)
Johnston (Bourbonnais, Poulin) – 59:59	5–1

10 min
Penalties
27 min
59
Shots
9

=== Fifth place game ===
16 April 2023; 10:00	Finland	3–1 (1–1, 1–0, 1–0)	Sweden	CAA Centre, Brampton; Attendance: 956

Game reference

Sanni Ahola
Goalies
Emma Söderberg
Referees:
(United States) Kelly Cooke
(Canada) Cianna Lieffers
Linesmen:
(Sweden) Anna Hammar
(Finland) Tiina Saarimäki

	0–1	00:48 – Kjellbin (Johansson, Hjalmarsson)
Hiirikoski (PP) – 10:12	1–1
Yrjänen (Savolainen, Vainikka) – 26:48	2–1
Tulus (Nieminen, Hiirikoski) (PP) – 57:10	3–1

4 min
Penalties
14 min
42
Shots
19

=== Third place game ===
16 April 2023; 15:00	Czechia	3–2 (2–1, 1–1, 0–0)	Switzerland	CAA Centre, Brampton; Attendance: 2,162

Game reference

Blanka Škodová
Goalies
Andrea Brändli
Referees:
(United States) Samantha Hiller
(United States) Chelsea Rapin
Linesmen:
(United States) Jennifer Cameron
(Canada) Jessica Chartrand

	0–1	11:15 – Stalder (Quennec, Müller) (PP)
Křížová (Vanišová, Tejralová) – 11:46	1–1
Pejzlová (Vanišová, Křížová) – 14:31	2–1
	2–2	28:09 – Lutz
Křížová (Tejralová, Jandušíková) – 37:16	3–2

12 min
Penalties
16 min
33
Shots
13

=== Final ===
16 April 2023; 19:00	Canada	3–6 (1–1, 2–1, 0–4)	United States	CAA Centre, Brampton; Attendance: 4,635

Game reference

Ann-Renée Desbiens
Goalies
Aerin Frankel
Referees:
(Canada) Elizabeth Mantha
(United States) Amanda Tassoni
Linesmen:
(United States) Sarah Buckner
(Canada) Justine Todd

Poulin (Ambrose, Jenner) (PP2) – 06:23	1–0
	1–1	18:01 – Murphy (Carpenter)
Jenner (Fast, Rattray) – 25:03	2–1
	2–2	28:30 – Knight (Kessel)
Jenner (Fast, Poulin) – 29:39	3–2
	3–3	45:40 – Harvey
	3–4	56:50 – Knight (Heise, Carpenter) (PP2)
	3–5	57:17 – Knight (Harvey, Kessel) (PP)
	3–6	58:02 – Barnes (ENG)

8 min
Penalties
10 min
27
Shots
22

== Awards and statistics ==
The awards were announced on 16 April 2023.

=== Awards ===
Directorate Awards

Position	Player
Goaltender	(Canada) Ann-Renée Desbiens
Defenceman	(United States) Caroline Harvey
Forward	(Canada) Sarah Fillier
MVP	(Canada) Sarah Fillier

All-Star team

Position	Player
Goaltender	(Sweden) Emma Söderberg
Defenceman	(Canada) Renata Fast
Defenceman	(United States) Caroline Harvey
Forward	(Canada) Sarah Fillier
Forward	(Finland) Petra Nieminen
Forward	(Canada) Marie-Philip Poulin

=== Scoring leaders ===
List shows the top skaters sorted by points, then goals.

Player	GP	G	A	Pts	+/−	PIM	POS
(United States) Caroline Harvey	7	4	10	14	+14	6	D
(Finland) Petra Nieminen	7	6	7	13	+7	2	F
(United States) Hilary Knight	7	8	4	12	+7	6	F
(United States) Taylor Heise	7	1	11	12	+9	2	F
(Canada) Sarah Fillier	7	7	4	11	+9	2	F
(Sweden) Hilda Svensson	7	5	6	11	+8	2	F
(Sweden) Hanna Olsson	7	4	7	11	+9	4	F
(Switzerland) Lara Stalder	7	4	7	11	+1	35	F
(Finland) Jenni Hiirikoski	7	3	8	11	+6	2	D
(Sweden) Lina Ljungblom	7	7	3	10	+6	6	F

GP = Games played; G = Goals; A = Assists; Pts = Points; +/− = Plus/minus; PIM = Penalties in minutes; POS = Position
Source: IIHF

=== Leading goaltenders ===
Only the top five goaltenders, based on save percentage, who have played at least 40% of their team's minutes, are included in this list.

Player	TOI	GA	GAA	SA	Sv%	SO
(Finland) Sanni Ahola	179:39	2	0.67	46	95.65	1
(United States) Aerin Frankel	364:01	9	1.48	132	93.18	1
(Germany) Sandra Abstreiter	288:39	13	2.70	182	92.86	1
(Sweden) Emma Söderberg	301:47	13	2.58	170	92.35	1
(Finland) Anni Keisala	237:01	6	1.52	75	92.00	1

TOI = Time on ice (minutes:seconds); SA = Shots against; GA = Goals against; GAA = Goals against average; Sv% = Save percentage; SO = Shutouts
Source: IIHF

== Final standings ==
Pos	Grp	Team	Pld	W	OTW	OTL	L	GF	GA	GD	Pts	Final result
1	A	United States	7	6	0	1	0	43	12	+31	19	Champions
2	A	Canada (H)	7	4	2	0	1	29	13	+16	16	Runners-up
3	A	Czechia	7	3	1	0	3	16	26	−10	11	Third place
4	A	Switzerland	7	2	0	0	5	15	30	−15	6	Fourth place
5	B	Finland	7	6	0	0	1	38	8	+30	18	Fifth place game
6	B	Sweden	7	3	0	1	3	22	20	+2	10	Fifth place game
7	A	Japan	6	0	0	1	5	6	24	−18	1	
8	B	Germany	6	3	0	0	3	13	17	−4	9	
9	B	Hungary	4	1	0	0	3	7	15	−8	3	Eliminated in Preliminary round and relegated to the 2024 Division I A
10	B	France	4	0	0	0	4	5	29	−24	0	Eliminated in Preliminary round and relegated to the 2024 Division I A

Source: IIHF
Rules for classification: 1) tier of the group; 2) position in the group; 3) number of points; 4) goal difference; 5) goals scored; 6) seeding before tournament.
(H) Host
