= Grégory Tarlé =

French ice hockey player and coach

- Born: 11 April 1983 (age 43) Rouen, France
- Height: 1.79 cm (0.70 in)
- Weight: 77 kg (170 lb; 12 st 2 lb)
- Position: Forward
- Shot: Left
- Played for: Neuilly-sur-Marne
- Current coach: France
- Playing career: 2002–2009
- Coaching career: 2010–present

Grégory Tarlé (born 11 April 1983) is a French ice hockey coach and the current head coach of the French women's national team. Prior to his coaching career, he played as a forward with the Docks du Havre and the Bisons de Neuilly-sur-Marne.

== Coaching career ==
Tarlé started with the national team as an assistant coach to head coach Christine Duchamp ahead of the 2011 IIHF Women's World Championship Division II. He remained in role until being promoted to head coach in 2013. His first major tournament as head coach was the 2014 IIHF Women's World Championship Division I Group A.

Under Tarlé, France achieved promotion to the World Championship Top Division tournament for the first time in national team history and made their debut at the 2019 IIHF Women's World Championship. They returned to the Top Division for the 2023 IIHF Women's World Championship.
