= Louanne Mermier =

French ice hockey player

- Born: 1 February 2001 (age 24); Sallanches, France
- Height: 1.74 m (5 ft 9 in)
- Weight: 78 kg (172 lb; 12 st 4 lb)
- Position: Defence
- Shoots: Right
- CFHF team Former teams: Megève HC; Hockey Club 74; Chamonix HC
- National team: France
- Playing career: 2016–present

Louanne Mermier (born 1 February 2001) is a French ice hockey player for Megève HC and the French national team.

She represented France at the 2019 IIHF Women's World Championship.
