= Anaé Simon =

French ice hockey player (born 2002)

- Born: 16 December 2002 (age 23) Lannemezan, France
- Height: 1.69 m (5 ft 7 in)
- Weight: 66 kg (146 lb; 10 st 6 lb)
- Position: Forward
- Shoots: Right
- FFHGD1 team Former teams: Lyon Hockey Club; Amiens
- National team: France
- Playing career: 2016–present

Anae Simon (born 16 December 2002) is a French ice hockey player.

== International play ==
Simon represented the France national team at the 2026 Winter Olympics and the 2023 IIHF Women's World Championship.
