= Manon le Scodan =

French ice hockey player (born 2004)

- Born: 25 December 2004 (age 21) Sallanches, France
- Height: 1.69 m (5 ft 7 in)
- Weight: 67 kg (148 lb; 10 st 8 lb)
- Position: Forward
- Shoots: Left
- ECAC team Former teams: Clarkson Golden Knights; Hockey Club 74
- National team: France
- Playing career: 2018–present

Manon le Scodan (born 25 December 2004) is a French ice hockey player. A member of the French women's national ice hockey team since 2022, she participated in women's ice hockey tournament at the 2026 Winter Olympics.

== Playing career ==
=== College ===
Le Scodan began her college ice hockey career in 2022 at John Abbott College, where she spent three seasons with the Islanders women's ice hockey program in the RSEQ.

In 2025, she joined the Clarkson Golden Knights women's ice hockey program in the ECAC conference of the NCAA Division I. In her debut with the Golden Knights, a 26 September 2025 road match versus Merrimack, le Scodan logged a goal and an assist.

=== International ===
Making her Olympic debut on February 5, 2026, also the first game for France in women's ice hockey at the Olympics, le Scodan, wearing number 22, logged 21:52 of ice time.

On 9 February 2026, le Scodan earned an assist on a goal by Estelle Duvin in a 2–1 overtime loss versus Germany.
