= Emma Nonnenmacher =

Canadian-French ice hockey player (born 2004)

- Born: 21 August 2004 (age 22) Haguenau, France
- Height: 1.70 m (5 ft 7 in)
- Weight: 60 kg (132 lb; 9 st 6 lb)
- Position: Forward
- Shoots: Left
- RSEQ team: Concordia Stingers
- National team: France
- Playing career: 2018–present

Emma Nonnenmacher (born 21 August 2004) is a Canadian-French ice hockey player and member of the French national team. She represented France in the women's ice hockey tournament at the 2026 Winter Olympics.

== Playing career ==
=== College ===
Nonnenmacher has played college ice hockey with the Concordia Stingers women's ice hockey program in the RSEQ conference of U Sports since 2025. She was joined on the French national team at the 2026 Winter Olympics by former Concordia goaltender Alice Philbert.
