= France women's national ice hockey team =

France
- Nickname: Les Bleus (The Blues)
- Association: French Ice Hockey Federation
- General manager: Jean Baptiste Chauvin
- Head coach: Grégory Tarlé
- Assistants: Pierre Pousse; Sébastien Roujon
- Captain: Lore Baudrit
- Most games: Lore Baudrit (105)
- Top scorer: Marion Allemoz (43)
- Most points: Marion Allemoz (77)
- Team colors
- IIHF code: FRA

Ranking
- Current IIHF: 11 (▲3) (3 June 2026)
- Highest IIHF: 10 (first in 2018)
- Lowest IIHF: 16 (first in 2011)

First international
- France 1–1 Czechoslovakia (Plzeň, Czechoslovakia; 18 March 1989)

Biggest win
- France 17–0 Hungary (Tilburg, Netherlands; 9 February 2002)

Biggest defeat
- Finland 28–0 France (Havířov, Czechoslovakia; 18 March 1991)

Olympics
- Appearances: 1 (first in 2026)
- Medals: 10th (2026)

World Championships
- Appearances: 23 (first in 1999)
- Best result: 10th (2016, 2018, 2019)

International record (W–L–T)
- 201–247–23

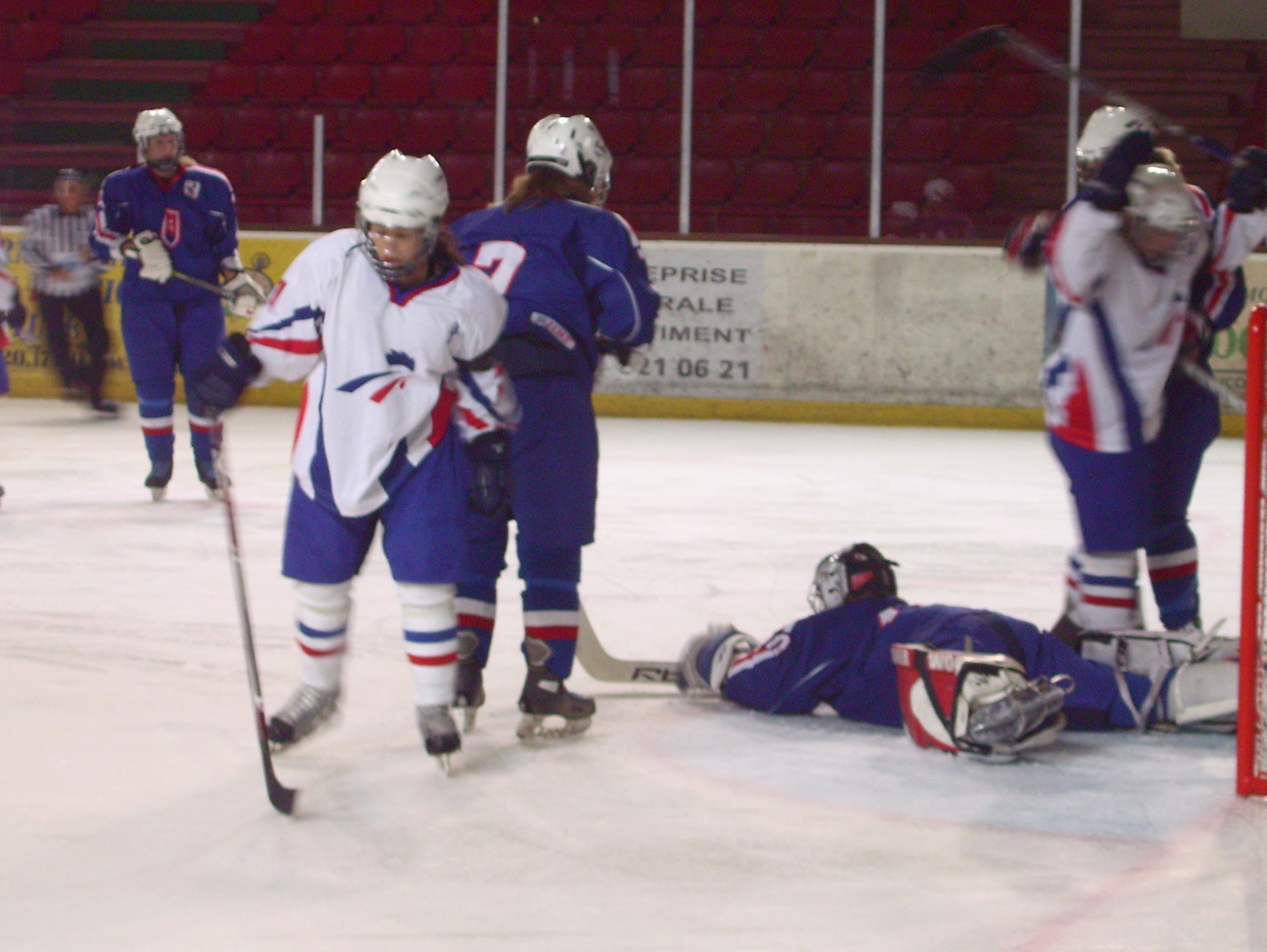
France-Slovakia at Briançon (28 August 2008)

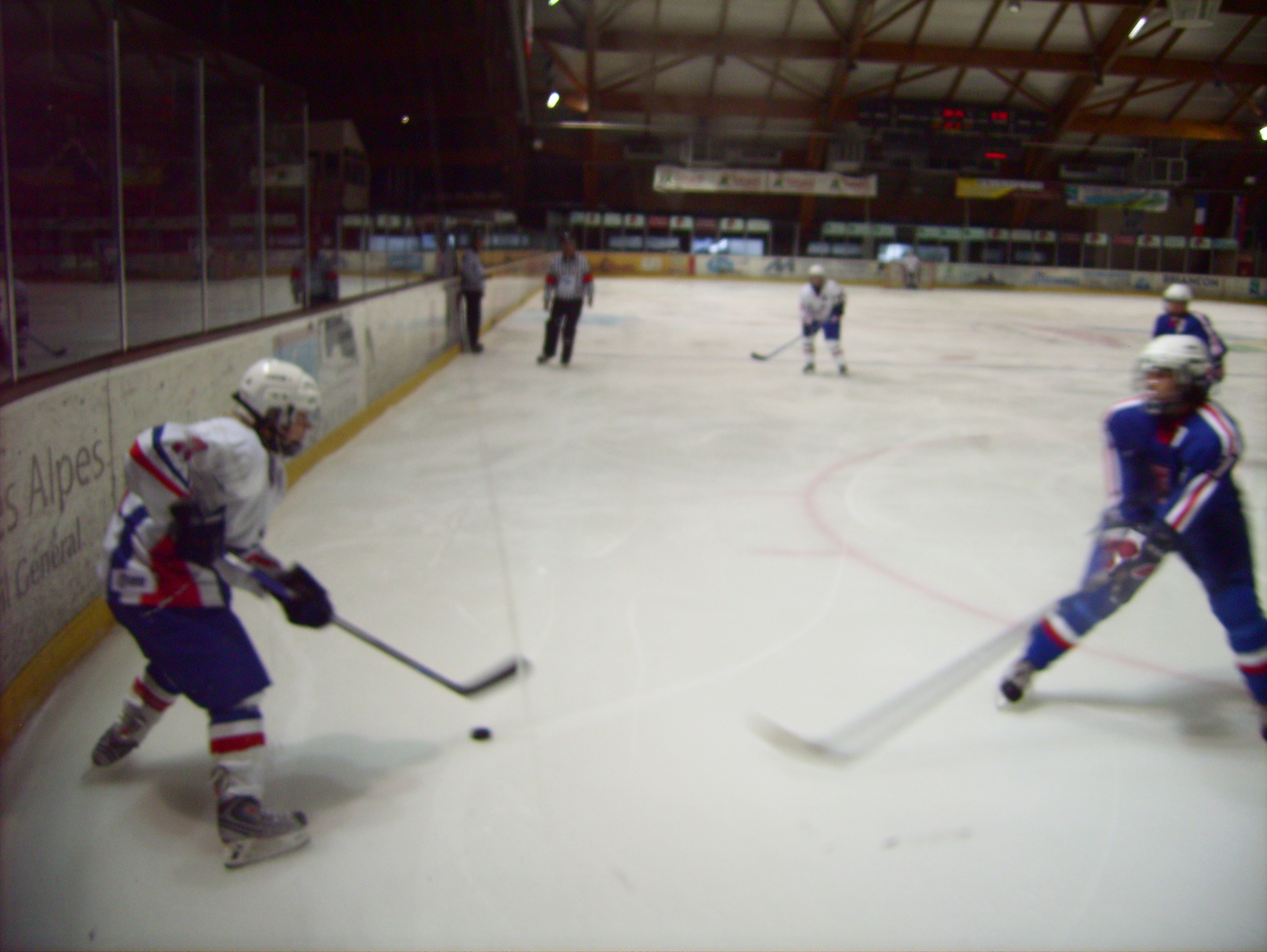
France vs Slovakia at Briançon on 28 August 2008

The French women's national ice hockey team represents France at international ice hockey tournaments, including the International Ice Hockey Federation (IIHF) Women's World Championship. The women's national team is controlled by French Ice Hockey Federation (FFHG). France had 2,622 female ice hockey players registered with the IIHF in 2022, an increase of more than 250% over the 952 players recorded in 2011. As of March 2022, the French women's national team is ranked twelfth in the world; they have ranked as high as tenth, first in 2018.

== Tournament record ==
=== Olympic Games ===
- 2026 – Finished in 10th place

=== World Championship ===
- 1999 – Finished in 11th place (3rd in Lower Division)
- 2000 – Finished in 13th place (5th in Lower Division)
- 2001 – Finished in 13th place (5th in Division I)
- 2003 – 4th in Division I (Top Division not Played)
- 2004 – Finished in 13th place (4th in Division I)
- 2005 – Finished in 12th place (4th in Division I)
- 2007 – Finished in 12th place (3rd in Division I)
- 2008 – Finished in 13th place (4th in Division I)
- 2009 – Finished in 15th place (6th in Division I and demoted to Division II)
- 2011 – Finished in 15th place (2nd in Division II)
- 2012 – Finished in 17th place (3rd in Division IB)
- 2013 – Finished in 15th place (1st in Division IB and promoted to Division IA)
- 2014 – Finished in 12th place (4th in Division IA)
- 2015 – Finished in 11th place (3rd in Division IA)
- 2016 – Finished in 10th place (2nd in Division IA)
- 2017 – Finished in 14th place (6th in Division IA)
- 2018 – Finished in 10th place (1st in Division IA and promoted to Top division)
- 2019 – Finished in 10th place (demoted to Division IA)
- 2020 – Cancelled due to the COVID-19 pandemic
- 2021 – Cancelled due to the COVID-19 pandemic
- 2022 – Finished in 11th place (1st in Division IA and promoted to Top division)
- 2023 – Finished in 10th place (relegated to Division IA)
- 2024 – Finished in 13th place (3rd in Division IA)
- 2025 – Finished in 14th place (4th in Division IA)
- 2026 – Finished in 11th place (1st in Division IA and promoted to Top division)

=== European Championship ===
- 1991 – Finished in 7th place
- 1993 – Finished in 9th place (3rd in Group B)
- 1995 – Finished in 11th place (5th in Group B)
- 1996 – Finished in 11th place (5th in Group B)

== Team ==
=== 2026 Olympics roster ===
The roster was announced on 23 December 2025.

Head coach: Grégory Tarlé

No.	Pos.	Name	Height	Weight	Birthdate	Team
1	G	Margaux Mameri	1.61 m (5 ft 3 in)	58 kg (128 lb)	12 April 1997 (aged 28)	(France) Les Comètes de Meudon
5	D	Gabrielle De Serres	1.73 m (5 ft 8 in)	70 kg (150 lb)	29 January 1998 (aged 28)	(Canada) Sudbury Lady Wolves
6	F	Margot Huot-Marchand	1.60 m (5 ft 3 in)	73 kg (161 lb)	10 June 2000 (aged 25)	(Sweden) Rögle BK
7	D	Lucie Quarto	1.67 m (5 ft 6 in)	66 kg (146 lb)	7 September 2002 (aged 23)	(United States) Lindenwood Lady Lions
8	F	Jade Barbirati	1.67 m (5 ft 6 in)	67 kg (148 lb)	6 January 2004 (aged 22)	(United States) Quinnipiac Bobcats
10	D	Sophie Leclerc	1.64 m (5 ft 5 in)	64 kg (141 lb)	14 August 1997 (aged 28)	(France) Brûleurs de Loups
11	D	Léa Villiot	1.65 m (5 ft 5 in)	64 kg (141 lb)	11 February 1997 (aged 28)	(Germany) ERC Ingolstadt
12	F	Estelle Duvin – A	1.71 m (5 ft 7 in)	65 kg (143 lb)	1 February 1997 (aged 29)	(Switzerland) SC Bern
13	D	Marie-Pierre Pelissou	1.73 m (5 ft 8 in)	67 kg (148 lb)	31 August 1995 (aged 30)	(Switzerland) HC Davos Ladies
16	F	Clara Rozier – A	1.61 m (5 ft 3 in)	57 kg (126 lb)	28 August 1997 (aged 28)	(Switzerland) SC Bern
17	F	Chloé Aurard-Bushee	1.68 m (5 ft 6 in)	61 kg (134 lb)	15 March 1999 (aged 26)	(Switzerland) ZSC Lions
18	F	Anaé Simon	1.70 m (5 ft 7 in)	65 kg (143 lb)	16 December 2002 (aged 23)	(France) Lyon Hockey Club
19	F	Lore Baudrit – C	1.90 m (6 ft 3 in)	86 kg (190 lb)	11 October 1991 (aged 34)	(Germany) ERC Ingolstadt
21	F	Julia Mesplède	1.60 m (5 ft 3 in)	55 kg (121 lb)	12 October 2002 (aged 23)	(United States) Vermont Catamounts
22	F	Manon le Scodan	1.70 m (5 ft 7 in)	66 kg (146 lb)	25 December 2004 (aged 21)	(United States) Clarkson Golden Knights
24	F	Emma Nonnenmacher	1.70 m (5 ft 7 in)	60 kg (130 lb)	21 August 2004 (aged 21)	(Canada) Concordia Stingers
29	D	Lea Berger	1.77 m (5 ft 10 in)	63 kg (139 lb)	29 October 2003 (aged 22)	(Canada) Montreal Carabins
31	G	Violette Pianel-Couriaut	1.73 m (5 ft 8 in)	68 kg (150 lb)	9 May 2006 (aged 19)	(France) Villard-de-Lans U20
32	G	Alice Philbert	1.67 m (5 ft 6 in)	54 kg (119 lb)	10 November 1996 (aged 29)	(Italy) EV Bozen Eagles
44	F	Anais Peyne-Dingival	1.67 m (5 ft 6 in)	70 kg (150 lb)	29 May 2007 (aged 18)	(Canada) John Abbott College
55	F	Sehana Galbrun	1.69 m (5 ft 7 in)	60 kg (130 lb)	14 September 2005 (aged 20)	(Finland) HIFK
85	F	Clémence Boudin	1.63 m (5 ft 4 in)	56 kg (123 lb)	1 June 2008 (aged 17)	(France) Sporting Hockey Club Saint Gervais
91	D	Elina Zilliox	1.67 m (5 ft 6 in)	70 kg (150 lb)	14 May 2005 (aged 20)	(United States) Lindenwood Lady Lions

=== Team captaincy history ===
- Marion Allemoz, c. 2010–2022
- Lore Baudrit, 2022–present

=== Head coaches ===
- Patrick Adin, 1998–99
- James Tibbetts, 1999–2000
- Stéphane Sabourin, 2000–01
- Christer Eriksson, 2002–03
- Renaud Jacquin, 2003–2005
- Christine Duchamp, 2006–2013
- Grégory Tarlé, 2013–present
