= Margaux Mameri =

French ice hockey player (born 1997)

- Born: 12 April 1997 (age 28) Clamart, France
- Height: 1.61 m (5 ft 3 in)
- Weight: 65 kg (143 lb; 10 st 3 lb)
- Position: Goaltender
- Catches: Left
- FFHG D2 team Former teams: Jets d’Evry-Viry; HPK Hämeenlinna; IF Björklöven; Shelburne Stars; Pôle France Féminin
- National team: France
- Playing career: 2014–present

Margaux Mameri (born 12 April 1997) is a French ice hockey goaltender and member of the French national team, currently playing in the FFHG Division 2 with the Jets d’Evry-Viry. She began the 2022–23 season with HPK Hämeenlinna in the Finnish Naisten Liiga (NSML) before leaving the club in November 2022.

== Playing career ==
As a junior player with the French national under-18 ice team, Mameri participated in the Division I tournaments of the IIHF U18 Women's World Championship in 2014 and 2015. At the 2015 tournament, she was named Best Player of the French team by the coaches as France finished the tournament in first place and earned promotion to the Top Division.

She reprepresented France with the senior national team at the 2019 IIHF Women's World Championship and the 2022 IIHF Women's World Championship Division I. She did not see ice time at either tournament, serving as third goaltender behind starter Caroline Baldin and backup Caroline Lambert in 2019 and as backup to Baldin in 2022.

On February 5, 2026, Mameri, wearing the number 1, enjoyed her first Olympic experience. In a game versus Italy in the women's ice hockey tournament, she dressed as the backup goaltender to Alice Philbert.
