= Jade Barbirati =

French ice hockey player (born 2004)

- Born: 6 January 2004 (age 22) Aix-les-Bains, France
- Height: 1.67 m (5 ft 6 in)
- Weight: 67 kg (148 lb; 10 st 8 lb)
- Position: Forward
- Shoots: Left
- ECAC team: Quinnipiac Bobcats
- National team: France
- Playing career: 2021–present

Jade Barbirati (born 6 January 2004) is a French ice hockey player and member of the French national team. She represented France in the women's ice hockey tournament at the 2026 Winter Olympics.

== Playing career ==
=== College ===
Barbirati has played college ice hockey with the Quinnipiac Bobcats program in the ECAC conference of the NCAA Division I since 2025.

In her first appearance with the Bobcats, a 26 September 2025 game versus the Maine Black Bears, Barbirati contributed a pair of assists for her first collegiate points. The following day, Barbirati logged a pair of goals in a 4–3 overtime victory, including the game-winning goal. She was subsequently named ECAC Hockey Forward of the Week.

=== International ===
Barbirati made her Olympic debut on 5 February 2026 in a preliminary round match against Italy. She wore number 8 and logged 18:57 of ice time.
