= Ice hockey at the 2026 Winter Olympics – Women's team rosters =

These are the team rosters of the nations participating in the women's ice hockey tournament of the 2026 Winter Olympics.

Age and clubs listed as of the start of the tournament, 5 February 2026.

== Group A ==
=== Canada ===
The roster was announced on January 9, 2026.

Head coach: Troy Ryan

No.	Pos.	Name	Height	Weight	Birthdate	Team
2	D	Sophie Jaques	1.72 m (5 ft 8 in)	78 kg (172 lb)	16 October 2000 (aged 25)	(Canada) Vancouver Goldeneyes
3	D	Jocelyne Larocque – A	1.68 m (5 ft 6 in)	66 kg (146 lb)	19 May 1988 (aged 37)	(Canada) Ottawa Charge
4	D	Kati Tabin	1.72 m (5 ft 8 in)	70 kg (150 lb)	21 April 1997 (aged 28)	(Canada) Montreal Victoire
7	F	Laura Stacey	1.78 m (5 ft 10 in)	71 kg (157 lb)	5 May 1994 (aged 31)	(Canada) Montreal Victoire
10	F	Sarah Fillier	1.67 m (5 ft 6 in)	59 kg (130 lb)	9 June 2000 (aged 25)	(United States) New York Sirens
14	D	Renata Fast	1.70 m (5 ft 7 in)	65 kg (143 lb)	6 October 1994 (aged 31)	(Canada) Toronto Sceptres
17	D	Ella Shelton	1.73 m (5 ft 8 in)	68 kg (150 lb)	19 January 1998 (aged 28)	(Canada) Toronto Sceptres
19	F	Brianne Jenner	1.75 m (5 ft 9 in)	71 kg (157 lb)	4 May 1991 (aged 34)	(Canada) Ottawa Charge
20	F	Sarah Nurse	1.75 m (5 ft 9 in)	67 kg (148 lb)	5 January 1995 (aged 31)	(Canada) Vancouver Goldeneyes
23	D	Erin Ambrose	1.65 m (5 ft 5 in)	60 kg (130 lb)	30 April 1994 (aged 31)	(Canada) Montreal Victoire
24	F	Natalie Spooner	1.78 m (5 ft 10 in)	82 kg (181 lb)	17 October 1990 (aged 35)	(Canada) Toronto Sceptres
26	F	Emily Clark	1.70 m (5 ft 7 in)	61 kg (134 lb)	28 November 1995 (aged 30)	(Canada) Ottawa Charge
27	F	Emma Maltais	1.63 m (5 ft 4 in)	66 kg (146 lb)	4 November 1999 (aged 26)	(Canada) Toronto Sceptres
29	F	Marie-Philip Poulin – C	1.70 m (5 ft 7 in)	73 kg (161 lb)	28 March 1991 (aged 34)	(Canada) Montreal Victoire
35	G	Ann-Renée Desbiens	1.75 m (5 ft 9 in)	73 kg (161 lb)	10 April 1994 (aged 31)	(Canada) Montreal Victoire
38	G	Emerance Maschmeyer	1.68 m (5 ft 6 in)	64 kg (141 lb)	5 October 1994 (aged 31)	(Canada) Vancouver Goldeneyes
40	F	Blayre Turnbull – A	1.70 m (5 ft 7 in)	69 kg (152 lb)	15 July 1993 (aged 32)	(Canada) Toronto Sceptres
42	D	Claire Thompson	1.72 m (5 ft 8 in)	60 kg (130 lb)	28 January 1998 (aged 28)	(Canada) Vancouver Goldeneyes
43	F	Kristin O'Neill	1.63 m (5 ft 4 in)	57 kg (126 lb)	30 March 1998 (aged 27)	(United States) New York Sirens
82	G	Kayle Osborne	1.73 m (5 ft 8 in)	77 kg (170 lb)	28 February 2002 (aged 23)	(United States) New York Sirens
88	F	Julia Gosling	1.80 m (5 ft 11 in)	81 kg (179 lb)	21 February 2001 (aged 24)	(United States) Seattle Torrent
94	F	Jenn Gardiner	1.67 m (5 ft 6 in)	69 kg (152 lb)	18 September 2001 (aged 24)	(Canada) Vancouver Goldeneyes
95	F	Daryl Watts	1.67 m (5 ft 6 in)	65 kg (143 lb)	15 May 1999 (aged 26)	(Canada) Toronto Sceptres

=== Czech Republic ===
The roster was announced on 6 January 2026.

Head coach: (Canada) Carla MacLeod

No.	Pos.	Name	Height	Weight	Birthdate	Team
1	G	Michaela Hesová	1.69 m (5 ft 7 in)	60 kg (130 lb)	2 November 2005 (aged 20)	(United States) Dartmouth Big Green
2	D	Aneta Tejralová – C	1.64 m (5 ft 5 in)	57 kg (126 lb)	4 January 1996 (aged 30)	(United States) Seattle Torrent
3	F	Adéla Šapovalivová	1.61 m (5 ft 3 in)	58 kg (128 lb)	17 May 2006 (aged 19)	(United States) Wisconsin Badgers
4	D	Daniela Pejšová	1.73 m (5 ft 8 in)	73 kg (161 lb)	14 August 2002 (aged 23)	(United States) Boston Fleet
6	F	Linda Vocetková	1.74 m (5 ft 9 in)	70 kg (150 lb)	22 March 2007 (aged 18)	(Sweden) Djurgårdens IF
7	D	Klára Seroiszková	1.75 m (5 ft 9 in)	72 kg (159 lb)	25 January 2001 (aged 25)	(Switzerland) HC Davos
8	F	Tereza Pištěková	1.71 m (5 ft 7 in)	64 kg (141 lb)	3 June 2000 (aged 25)	(Sweden) SDE
10	F	Denisa Křížová – A	1.65 m (5 ft 5 in)	63 kg (139 lb)	3 November 1994 (aged 31)	(United States) Minnesota Frost
12	F	Klára Hymlárová	1.62 m (5 ft 4 in)	67 kg (148 lb)	27 February 1999 (aged 26)	(United States) Minnesota Frost
14	D	Dominika Lásková	1.67 m (5 ft 6 in)	71 kg (157 lb)	20 December 1996 (aged 29)	(Sweden) SDE
15	D	Andrea Trnková	1.76 m (5 ft 9 in)	75 kg (165 lb)	3 March 2004 (aged 21)	(United States) Clarkson Golden Knights
16	F	Kateřina Mrázová – A	1.63 m (5 ft 4 in)	64 kg (141 lb)	19 October 1992 (aged 33)	(Canada) Ottawa Charge
18	F	Michaela Pejzlová	1.70 m (5 ft 7 in)	62 kg (137 lb)	4 June 1997 (aged 28)	(Switzerland) HC Ambrì-Piotta
19	F	Natálie Mlýnková	1.61 m (5 ft 3 in)	63 kg (139 lb)	24 May 2001 (aged 24)	(Canada) Montreal Victoire
20	F	Barbora Juříčková	1.68 m (5 ft 6 in)	60 kg (130 lb)	21 October 2006 (aged 19)	(Finland) HPK Hämeenlinna
21	F	Tereza Vanišová	1.70 m (5 ft 7 in)	64 kg (141 lb)	30 January 1996 (aged 30)	(Canada) Vancouver Goldeneyes
22	F	Tereza Plosová	1.77 m (5 ft 10 in)	64 kg (141 lb)	5 July 2006 (aged 19)	(United States) Minnesota Golden Gophers
24	D	Sára Čajanová	1.68 m (5 ft 6 in)	63 kg (139 lb)	10 December 2002 (aged 23)	(Sweden) Brynäs IF
26	F	Vendula Přibylová	1.71 m (5 ft 7 in)	78 kg (172 lb)	23 March 1996 (aged 29)	(Sweden) Modo Hockey
28	D	Noemi Neubauerová	1.73 m (5 ft 8 in)	69 kg (152 lb)	15 December 1999 (aged 26)	(Switzerland) EV Zug
29	G	Klára Peslarová	1.64 m (5 ft 5 in)	63 kg (139 lb)	23 November 1996 (aged 29)	(Sweden) Brynäs IF
32	G	Julie Pejšová	1.72 m (5 ft 8 in)	91 kg (201 lb)	3 February 2003 (aged 23)	(Czech Republic) HC Milevsko 1934
98	F	Kristýna Kaltounková	1.74 m (5 ft 9 in)	77 kg (170 lb)	14 April 2002 (aged 23)	(United States) New York Sirens

=== Finland ===
The roster was announced on 2 January 2026.

Head coach: Tero Lehterä

No.	Pos.	Name	Height	Weight	Birthdate	Team
1	G	Sanni Ahola	1.71 m (5 ft 7 in)	81 kg (179 lb)	3 June 2000 (aged 25)	(Canada) Ottawa Charge
2	D	Sini Karjalainen	1.75 m (5 ft 9 in)	73 kg (161 lb)	30 January 1999 (aged 27)	(Sweden) Skellefteå AIK
5	D	Siiri Yrjölä	1.66 m (5 ft 5 in)	70 kg (150 lb)	8 September 2004 (aged 21)	(United States) St. Cloud State Huskies
6	D	Jenni Hiirikoski	1.62 m (5 ft 4 in)	62 kg (137 lb)	30 March 1987 (aged 38)	(Sweden) Luleå HF
7	D	Sanni Rantala	1.73 m (5 ft 8 in)	64 kg (141 lb)	8 July 2002 (aged 23)	(Sweden) Frölunda HC
8	D	Elli Suoranta	1.68 m (5 ft 6 in)	75 kg (165 lb)	17 June 2002 (aged 23)	(Finland) Ilves Tampere
9	D	Nelli Laitinen – A	1.69 m (5 ft 7 in)	62 kg (137 lb)	29 April 2002 (aged 23)	(United States) Minnesota Golden Gophers
10	F	Elisa Holopainen	1.66 m (5 ft 5 in)	58 kg (128 lb)	27 December 2001 (aged 24)	(Sweden) Frölunda HC
12	F	Sanni Vanhanen	1.68 m (5 ft 6 in)	65 kg (143 lb)	1 July 2005 (aged 20)	(United States) Ohio State Buckeyes
16	F	Petra Nieminen	1.69 m (5 ft 7 in)	71 kg (157 lb)	4 May 1999 (aged 26)	(Sweden) Luleå HF
18	F	Jenniina Nylund	1.71 m (5 ft 7 in)	62 kg (137 lb)	18 June 1999 (aged 26)	(Sweden) Brynäs IF
19	F	Ida Kuoppala	1.68 m (5 ft 6 in)	80 kg (180 lb)	17 February 2000 (aged 25)	(Sweden) Skellefteå AIK
22	F	Julia Schalin	1.60 m (5 ft 3 in)	65 kg (143 lb)	31 August 2005 (aged 20)	(United States) Mercyhurst Lakers
24	F	Viivi Vainikka	1.66 m (5 ft 5 in)	63 kg (139 lb)	23 December 2001 (aged 24)	(Sweden) Brynäs IF
30	G	Emilia Kyrkkö	1.69 m (5 ft 7 in)	74 kg (163 lb)	24 February 2004 (aged 21)	(United States) St. Cloud State Huskies
32	F	Emilia Vesa	1.77 m (5 ft 10 in)	67 kg (148 lb)	3 January 2001 (aged 25)	(Sweden) Frölunda HC
33	F	Michelle Karvinen – C	1.66 m (5 ft 5 in)	65 kg (143 lb)	27 March 1990 (aged 35)	(Canada) Vancouver Goldeneyes
36	G	Anni Keisala	1.75 m (5 ft 9 in)	80 kg (180 lb)	5 April 1997 (aged 28)	(Finland) HPK Hämeenlinna
40	F	Noora Tulus	1.65 m (5 ft 5 in)	65 kg (143 lb)	15 August 1995 (aged 30)	(Sweden) Brynäs IF
61	F	Emma Nuutinen	1.77 m (5 ft 10 in)	75 kg (165 lb)	7 December 1996 (aged 29)	(Finland) Kiekko-Espoo
77	F	Susanna Tapani	1.77 m (5 ft 10 in)	70 kg (150 lb)	2 March 1993 (aged 32)	(United States) Boston Fleet
88	D	Ronja Savolainen – A	1.77 m (5 ft 10 in)	75 kg (165 lb)	29 November 1997 (aged 28)	(Canada) Ottawa Charge
91	F	Julia Liikala	1.66 m (5 ft 5 in)	62 kg (137 lb)	20 March 2001 (aged 24)	(Switzerland) HC Ambrì-Piotta

=== Switzerland ===
The roster was announced on 7 January 2026.

Head coach: Colin Muller

No.	Pos.	Name	Height	Weight	Birthdate	Team
2	D	Annic Büchi	1.69 m (5 ft 7 in)	67 kg (148 lb)	2 April 2005 (aged 20)	(Switzerland) EV Zug
7	F	Lara Stalder – C	1.67 m (5 ft 6 in)	63 kg (139 lb)	15 May 1994 (aged 31)	(Switzerland) EV Zug
8	F	Kaleigh Quennec – A	1.72 m (5 ft 8 in)	80 kg (180 lb)	15 February 1998 (aged 27)	(Switzerland) SC Bern
9	D	Shannon Sigrist	1.67 m (5 ft 6 in)	67 kg (148 lb)	20 April 1999 (aged 26)	(Switzerland) ZSC Lions
11	F	Laura Zimmermann	1.63 m (5 ft 4 in)	69 kg (152 lb)	5 April 2003 (aged 22)	(United States) St. Cloud State Huskies
12	F	Lisa Rüedi	1.67 m (5 ft 6 in)	67 kg (148 lb)	3 November 2000 (aged 25)	(Switzerland) ZSC Lions
13	F	Ivana Wey	1.72 m (5 ft 8 in)	67 kg (148 lb)	4 February 2006 (aged 20)	(Switzerland) EV Zug
15	D	Laure Mériguet	1.73 m (5 ft 8 in)	65 kg (143 lb)	15 August 2008 (aged 17)	(Switzerland) Genève-Servette HC U17
16	D	Nicole Vallario	1.66 m (5 ft 5 in)	66 kg (146 lb)	30 August 2001 (aged 24)	(United States) New York Sirens
17	D	Lara Christen	1.63 m (5 ft 4 in)	64 kg (141 lb)	2 October 2002 (aged 23)	(Switzerland) SC Bern
18	D	Stefanie Wetli	1.73 m (5 ft 8 in)	67 kg (148 lb)	4 February 2000 (aged 26)	(Switzerland) SC Bern
20	G	Andrea Brändli	1.67 m (5 ft 6 in)	76 kg (168 lb)	5 June 1997 (aged 28)	(Sweden) Frölunda HC
21	F	Rahel Enzler	1.63 m (5 ft 4 in)	66 kg (146 lb)	30 July 2000 (aged 25)	(Switzerland) EV Zug
22	F	Sinja Leemann	1.68 m (5 ft 6 in)	65 kg (143 lb)	19 April 2002 (aged 23)	(Switzerland) SC Bern
25	F	Alina Müller – A	1.67 m (5 ft 6 in)	65 kg (143 lb)	12 March 1998 (aged 27)	(United States) Boston Fleet
26	F	Naemi Herzig	1.70 m (5 ft 7 in)	68 kg (150 lb)	21 March 2007 (aged 18)	(United States) Holy Cross Crusaders
28	F	Alina Marti	1.67 m (5 ft 6 in)	66 kg (146 lb)	23 April 2004 (aged 21)	(Switzerland) EV Zug
29	G	Saskia Maurer	1.66 m (5 ft 5 in)	59 kg (130 lb)	29 July 2001 (aged 24)	(Switzerland) SC Bern
53	F	Vanessa Schaefer	1.63 m (5 ft 4 in)	63 kg (139 lb)	21 March 2005 (aged 20)	(Canada) UBC Thunderbirds
68	F	Leoni Balzer	1.65 m (5 ft 5 in)	60 kg (130 lb)	18 January 2006 (aged 20)	(Switzerland) HC Davos
70	G	Monja Wagner	1.64 m (5 ft 5 in)	62 kg (137 lb)	10 April 2003 (aged 22)	(United States) Union Garnet Chargers
71	F	Lena-Marie Lutz	1.68 m (5 ft 6 in)	68 kg (150 lb)	12 July 2001 (aged 24)	(Switzerland) HC Ambrì-Piotta
82	D	Alessia Baechler	1.74 m (5 ft 9 in)	72 kg (159 lb)	7 September 2005 (aged 20)	(United States) Northeastern Huskies

=== United States ===
The roster was announced on January 2, 2026.

Head coach: John Wroblewski

No.	Pos.	Name	Height	Weight	Birthdate	Team
2	D	Lee Stecklein	1.83 m (6 ft 0 in)	77 kg (170 lb)	23 April 1994 (aged 31)	(United States) Minnesota Frost
3	D	Cayla Barnes	1.57 m (5 ft 2 in)	63 kg (139 lb)	7 January 1999 (aged 27)	(United States) Seattle Torrent
4	D	Caroline Harvey	1.73 m (5 ft 8 in)	73 kg (161 lb)	14 October 2002 (aged 23)	(United States) Wisconsin Badgers
5	D	Megan Keller – A	1.80 m (5 ft 11 in)	75 kg (165 lb)	1 May 1996 (aged 29)	(United States) Boston Fleet
6	D	Rory Guilday	1.80 m (5 ft 11 in)	74 kg (163 lb)	7 September 2002 (aged 23)	(Canada) Ottawa Charge
8	D	Haley Winn	1.68 m (5 ft 6 in)	68 kg (150 lb)	14 July 2003 (aged 22)	(United States) Boston Fleet
9	F	Kirsten Simms	1.65 m (5 ft 5 in)	61 kg (134 lb)	31 August 2004 (aged 21)	(United States) Wisconsin Badgers
10	D	Laila Edwards	1.85 m (6 ft 1 in)	83 kg (183 lb)	25 January 2004 (aged 22)	(United States) Wisconsin Badgers
12	F	Kelly Pannek	1.70 m (5 ft 7 in)	75 kg (165 lb)	29 December 1995 (aged 30)	(United States) Minnesota Frost
13	F	Grace Zumwinkle	1.75 m (5 ft 9 in)	75 kg (165 lb)	23 April 1999 (aged 26)	(United States) Minnesota Frost
16	F	Hayley Scamurra	1.73 m (5 ft 8 in)	73 kg (161 lb)	14 December 1994 (aged 31)	(Canada) Montreal Victoire
17	F	Britta Curl-Salemme	1.75 m (5 ft 9 in)	72 kg (159 lb)	20 March 2000 (aged 25)	(United States) Minnesota Frost
21	F	Hilary Knight – C	1.80 m (5 ft 11 in)	78 kg (172 lb)	12 July 1989 (aged 36)	(United States) Seattle Torrent
22	F	Tessa Janecke	1.73 m (5 ft 8 in)	76 kg (168 lb)	12 May 2004 (aged 21)	(United States) Penn State Nittany Lions
23	F	Hannah Bilka	1.65 m (5 ft 5 in)	59 kg (130 lb)	24 March 2001 (aged 24)	(United States) Seattle Torrent
24	F	Joy Dunne	1.80 m (5 ft 11 in)	79 kg (174 lb)	13 June 2005 (aged 20)	(United States) Ohio State Buckeyes
25	F	Alex Carpenter – A	1.70 m (5 ft 7 in)	70 kg (150 lb)	13 April 1994 (aged 31)	(United States) Seattle Torrent
26	F	Kendall Coyne Schofield	1.57 m (5 ft 2 in)	57 kg (126 lb)	25 May 1992 (aged 33)	(United States) Minnesota Frost
27	F	Taylor Heise	1.78 m (5 ft 10 in)	74 kg (163 lb)	17 March 2000 (aged 25)	(United States) Minnesota Frost
30	G	Ava McNaughton	1.83 m (6 ft 0 in)	83 kg (183 lb)	27 October 2004 (aged 21)	(United States) Wisconsin Badgers
31	G	Aerin Frankel	1.65 m (5 ft 5 in)	63 kg (139 lb)	24 May 1999 (aged 26)	(United States) Boston Fleet
33	G	Gwyneth Philips	1.65 m (5 ft 5 in)	63 kg (139 lb)	17 September 2000 (aged 25)	(Canada) Ottawa Charge
37	F	Abbey Murphy	1.65 m (5 ft 5 in)	66 kg (146 lb)	14 April 2002 (aged 23)	(United States) Minnesota Golden Gophers

== Group B ==
=== France ===
The roster was announced on 23 December 2025.

Head coach: Grégory Tarlé

No.	Pos.	Name	Height	Weight	Birthdate	Team
1	G	Margaux Mameri	1.61 m (5 ft 3 in)	58 kg (128 lb)	12 April 1997 (aged 28)	(France) Les Comètes de Meudon
5	D	Gabrielle De Serres	1.73 m (5 ft 8 in)	70 kg (150 lb)	29 January 1998 (aged 28)	(Canada) Sudbury Lady Wolves
6	F	Margot Huot-Marchand	1.60 m (5 ft 3 in)	73 kg (161 lb)	10 June 2000 (aged 25)	(Sweden) Rögle BK
7	D	Lucie Quarto	1.67 m (5 ft 6 in)	66 kg (146 lb)	7 September 2002 (aged 23)	(United States) Lindenwood Lady Lions
8	F	Jade Barbirati	1.67 m (5 ft 6 in)	67 kg (148 lb)	6 January 2004 (aged 22)	(United States) Quinnipiac Bobcats
10	D	Sophie Leclerc	1.64 m (5 ft 5 in)	64 kg (141 lb)	14 August 1997 (aged 28)	(France) Brûleurs de Loups
11	D	Léa Villiot	1.65 m (5 ft 5 in)	64 kg (141 lb)	11 February 1997 (aged 28)	(Germany) ERC Ingolstadt
12	F	Estelle Duvin – A	1.71 m (5 ft 7 in)	65 kg (143 lb)	1 February 1997 (aged 29)	(Switzerland) SC Bern
13	D	Marie-Pierre Pelissou	1.73 m (5 ft 8 in)	67 kg (148 lb)	31 August 1995 (aged 30)	(Switzerland) HC Davos Ladies
16	F	Clara Rozier – A	1.61 m (5 ft 3 in)	57 kg (126 lb)	28 August 1997 (aged 28)	(Switzerland) SC Bern
17	F	Chloé Aurard-Bushee	1.68 m (5 ft 6 in)	61 kg (134 lb)	15 March 1999 (aged 26)	(Switzerland) ZSC Lions
18	F	Anaé Simon	1.70 m (5 ft 7 in)	65 kg (143 lb)	16 December 2002 (aged 23)	(France) Lyon Hockey Club
19	F	Lore Baudrit – C	1.90 m (6 ft 3 in)	86 kg (190 lb)	11 October 1991 (aged 34)	(Germany) ERC Ingolstadt
21	F	Julia Mesplède	1.60 m (5 ft 3 in)	55 kg (121 lb)	12 October 2002 (aged 23)	(United States) Vermont Catamounts
22	F	Manon le Scodan	1.70 m (5 ft 7 in)	66 kg (146 lb)	25 December 2004 (aged 21)	(United States) Clarkson Golden Knights
24	F	Emma Nonnenmacher	1.70 m (5 ft 7 in)	60 kg (130 lb)	21 August 2004 (aged 21)	(Canada) Concordia Stingers
29	D	Lea Berger	1.77 m (5 ft 10 in)	63 kg (139 lb)	29 October 2003 (aged 22)	(Canada) Montreal Carabins
31	G	Violette Pianel-Couriaut	1.73 m (5 ft 8 in)	68 kg (150 lb)	9 May 2006 (aged 19)	(France) Villard-de-Lans U20
32	G	Alice Philbert	1.67 m (5 ft 6 in)	54 kg (119 lb)	10 November 1996 (aged 29)	(Italy) EV Bozen Eagles
44	F	Anais Peyne-Dingival	1.67 m (5 ft 6 in)	70 kg (150 lb)	29 May 2007 (aged 18)	(Canada) John Abbott College
55	F	Sehana Galbrun	1.69 m (5 ft 7 in)	60 kg (130 lb)	14 September 2005 (aged 20)	(Finland) HIFK
85	F	Clémence Boudin	1.63 m (5 ft 4 in)	56 kg (123 lb)	1 June 2008 (aged 17)	(France) Sporting Hockey Club Saint Gervais
91	D	Elina Zilliox	1.67 m (5 ft 6 in)	70 kg (150 lb)	14 May 2005 (aged 20)	(United States) Lindenwood Lady Lions

=== Germany ===
The roster was announced on 7 January 2026.

Head coach: (Canada) Jeff MacLeod

No.	Pos.	Name	Height	Weight	Birthdate	Team
5	D	Charlott Schaffrath	1.84 m (6 ft 0 in)	72 kg (159 lb)	26 December 2005 (aged 20)	(Germany) ECDC Memmingen
7	F	Franziska Feldmeier	1.65 m (5 ft 5 in)	68 kg (150 lb)	5 February 1999 (aged 27)	(Germany) Eisbären Juniors Berlin
8	D	Ronja Hark – A	1.58 m (5 ft 2 in)	60 kg (130 lb)	17 August 2003 (aged 22)	(Germany) ECDC Memmingen
9	F	Svenja Voigt	1.65 m (5 ft 5 in)	60 kg (130 lb)	29 March 2004 (aged 21)	(United States) St. Cloud State Huskies
10	F	Katharina Häckelsmiller	1.65 m (5 ft 5 in)	63 kg (139 lb)	27 August 2004 (aged 21)	(Germany) ERC Ingolstadt
11	F	Nicola Hadraschek-Eisenschmid	1.66 m (5 ft 5 in)	68 kg (150 lb)	10 September 1996 (aged 29)	(Germany) ECDC Memmingen
13	F	Luisa Welcke	1.66 m (5 ft 5 in)	66 kg (146 lb)	29 April 2002 (aged 23)	(United States) Boston University Terriers
14	D	Carina Strobel	1.72 m (5 ft 8 in)	62 kg (137 lb)	11 September 1997 (aged 28)	(Germany) ECDC Memmingen
16	F	Jule Schiefer	1.73 m (5 ft 8 in)	68 kg (150 lb)	12 September 2001 (aged 24)	(Germany) ECDC Memmingen
17	F	Emily Nix	1.73 m (5 ft 8 in)	77 kg (170 lb)	12 January 1998 (aged 28)	(Sweden) Frölunda HC
20	D	Daria Gleißner – C	1.71 m (5 ft 7 in)	69 kg (152 lb)	30 June 1993 (aged 32)	(Germany) ECDC Memmingen
23	F	Lilli Welcke	1.66 m (5 ft 5 in)	66 kg (146 lb)	29 April 2002 (aged 23)	(United States) Boston University Terriers
25	F	Laura Kluge – A	1.79 m (5 ft 10 in)	63 kg (139 lb)	6 November 1996 (aged 29)	(United States) Boston Fleet
26	D	Tara Schmitz	1.65 m (5 ft 5 in)	61 kg (134 lb)	16 March 1998 (aged 27)	(Germany) Mad Dogs Mannheim
28	D	Nina Jobst-Smith	1.70 m (5 ft 7 in)	67 kg (148 lb)	30 August 2001 (aged 24)	(Canada) Vancouver Goldeneyes
29	F	Nina Christof	1.64 m (5 ft 5 in)	66 kg (146 lb)	18 August 2003 (aged 22)	(United States) RPI Engineers
34	F	Celina Haider	1.70 m (5 ft 7 in)	62 kg (137 lb)	20 July 2000 (aged 25)	(Germany) Eisbären Juniors Berlin
35	G	Sandra Abstreiter	1.81 m (5 ft 11 in)	78 kg (172 lb)	23 July 1998 (aged 27)	(Canada) Montreal Victoire
41	F	Mathilda Heine	1.70 m (5 ft 7 in)	69 kg (152 lb)	18 February 2009 (aged 16)	(Germany) Eisbären Juniors Berlin
44	D	Hanna Hoppe	1.64 m (5 ft 5 in)	62 kg (137 lb)	23 August 2006 (aged 19)	(Germany) ESC Dresden
70	G	Lisa Hemmerle	1.67 m (5 ft 6 in)	63 kg (139 lb)	11 December 1995 (aged 30)	(Germany) ERC Ingolstadt
71	F	Anne Bartsch	1.64 m (5 ft 5 in)	64 kg (141 lb)	22 September 1995 (aged 30)	(Germany) ECDC Memmingen
75	G	Chiara Schultes	1.67 m (5 ft 6 in)	62 kg (137 lb)	22 July 2005 (aged 20)	(Germany) ECDC Memmingen

=== Italy ===
The roster was named on 20 January 2026.

Head coach: (Canada) Eric Bouchard

No.	Pos.	Name	Height	Weight	Birthdate	Team
1	G	Gabriella Durante	1.81 m (5 ft 11 in)	69 kg (152 lb)	20 January 2001 (aged 25)	(Italy) Real Torino
2	D	Amie Varano	1.65 m (5 ft 5 in)	65 kg (143 lb)	18 June 1994 (aged 31)	(Sweden) Malmö Redhawks
3	D	Manuela Heidenberger	1.71 m (5 ft 7 in)	66 kg (146 lb)	15 September 2007 (aged 18)	(Finland) HPK Hämeenlinna
4	F	Carola Saletta	1.74 m (5 ft 9 in)	66 kg (146 lb)	11 February 1993 (aged 32)	(Switzerland) HC Fribourg-Gottéron
8	F	Anna Caumo	1.67 m (5 ft 6 in)	67 kg (148 lb)	16 February 2002 (aged 23)	(Italy) HC Pustertal Wölfe
10	F	Aurora Abatangelo	1.65 m (5 ft 5 in)	69 kg (152 lb)	14 December 2002 (aged 23)	(Switzerland) HC Davos
11	F	Justine Reyes	1.73 m (5 ft 8 in)	72 kg (159 lb)	14 February 1997 (aged 28)	(Sweden) Modo Hockey
12	F	Rebecca Roccella	1.62 m (5 ft 4 in)	60 kg (130 lb)	3 April 2001 (aged 24)	(Switzerland) HC Davos
13	D	Laura Lobis	1.68 m (5 ft 6 in)	72 kg (159 lb)	25 March 2006 (aged 19)	(Italy) SV Kaltern
14	F	Eleonora Bonafini	1.74 m (5 ft 9 in)	74 kg (163 lb)	17 February 1995 (aged 30)	(Italy) Bolzano Eagles
15	D	Greta Niccolai	1.62 m (5 ft 4 in)	60 kg (130 lb)	10 May 2001 (aged 24)	(Switzerland) HC Davos
17	F	Matilde Fantin	1.74 m (5 ft 9 in)	74 kg (163 lb)	1 January 2007 (aged 19)	(United States) Penn State Nittany Lions
18	D	Franziska Stocker	1.72 m (5 ft 8 in)	75 kg (165 lb)	16 December 1997 (aged 28)	(Sweden) Södertälje SK
19	F	Kristin Della Rovere	1.76 m (5 ft 9 in)	74 kg (163 lb)	30 November 2000 (aged 25)	(Canada) Toronto Sceptres
21	F	Marta Mazzocchi	1.60 m (5 ft 3 in)	61 kg (134 lb)	23 August 2004 (aged 21)	(Italy) Bolzano Eagles
22	F	Sara Kaneppele	1.74 m (5 ft 9 in)	74 kg (163 lb)	30 June 2003 (aged 22)	(Italy) Bolzano Eagles
25	G	Martina Fedel	1.65 m (5 ft 5 in)	62 kg (137 lb)	20 December 2002 (aged 23)	(Canada) University of Guelph
27	D	Kristen Guerriero	1.72 m (5 ft 8 in)	77 kg (170 lb)	27 May 1999 (aged 26)	(Italy) Bolzano Eagles
55	D	Jacquie Pierri	1.63 m (5 ft 4 in)	65 kg (143 lb)	11 June 1990 (aged 35)	(Italy) Bolzano Eagles
66	G	Margherita Ostoni	1.68 m (5 ft 6 in)	68 kg (150 lb)	1 July 2006 (aged 19)	(Sweden) IF Björklöven
77	D	Laura Fortino – A	1.63 m (5 ft 4 in)	62 kg (137 lb)	30 January 1991 (aged 35)	(Italy) Real Torino
82	F	Kayla Tutino – A	1.65 m (5 ft 5 in)	62 kg (137 lb)	18 December 1992 (aged 33)	(Italy) Real Torino
93	D	Nadia Mattivi – C	1.77 m (5 ft 10 in)	78 kg (172 lb)	2 May 2000 (aged 25)	(Sweden) Luleå HF

=== Japan ===
The roster was announced on 25 December 2025.

Head coach: Yuji Iizuka

No.	Pos.	Name	Height	Weight	Birthdate	Team
2	D	Shiori Koike – C	1.59 m (5 ft 3 in)	56 kg (123 lb)	21 March 1993 (aged 32)	(Japan) DK Perigrine
3	D	Aoi Shiga	1.65 m (5 ft 5 in)	61 kg (134 lb)	4 July 1999 (aged 26)	(Sweden) Modo Hockey
4	D	Ayaka Hitosato – A	1.60 m (5 ft 3 in)	60 kg (130 lb)	22 August 1994 (aged 31)	(Sweden) Linköping HC
5	D	Shiori Yamashita	1.58 m (5 ft 2 in)	53 kg (117 lb)	28 April 2002 (aged 23)	(Japan) Seibu Princess Rabbits
6	D	Kohane Sato	1.64 m (5 ft 5 in)	63 kg (139 lb)	16 March 2006 (aged 19)	(Japan) Daishin IHC
7	D	Kanami Seki	1.68 m (5 ft 6 in)	66 kg (146 lb)	23 June 2000 (aged 25)	(Japan) Seibu Princess Rabbits
8	D	Akane Hosoyamada – A	1.63 m (5 ft 4 in)	62 kg (137 lb)	9 March 1992 (aged 33)	(Japan) DK Perigrine
9	D	Nana Akimoto	1.59 m (5 ft 3 in)	50 kg (110 lb)	8 April 2009 (aged 16)	(Japan) DK Perigrine
11	F	Akane Shiga	1.65 m (5 ft 5 in)	63 kg (139 lb)	3 March 2001 (aged 24)	(Sweden) Luleå HF
13	F	Yumeka Wajima	1.56 m (5 ft 1 in)	50 kg (110 lb)	19 October 2002 (aged 23)	(Japan) DK Perigrine
14	F	Haruka Toko	1.67 m (5 ft 6 in)	64 kg (141 lb)	16 March 1997 (aged 28)	(Sweden) Linköping HC
15	F	Rui Ukita	1.70 m (5 ft 7 in)	71 kg (157 lb)	6 June 1996 (aged 29)	(Japan) Daishin IHC
17	F	Ai Tada	1.58 m (5 ft 2 in)	60 kg (130 lb)	4 April 2006 (aged 19)	(Japan) Daishin IHC
18	F	Suzuka Maeda	1.61 m (5 ft 3 in)	54 kg (119 lb)	16 October 1996 (aged 29)	(Japan) DK Perigrine
19	F	Makoto Ito	1.69 m (5 ft 7 in)	73 kg (161 lb)	2 May 2004 (aged 21)	(Japan) Toyota Cygnus
20	G	Miyuu Masuhara	1.57 m (5 ft 2 in)	53 kg (117 lb)	4 October 2001 (aged 24)	(Japan) DK Perigrine
24	F	Mei Miura	1.62 m (5 ft 4 in)	65 kg (143 lb)	16 November 1998 (aged 27)	(Japan) Toyota Cygnus
27	F	Remi Koyama	1.47 m (4 ft 10 in)	54 kg (119 lb)	17 July 2000 (aged 25)	(Japan) Seibu Princess Rabbits
30	G	Rei Halloran	1.70 m (5 ft 7 in)	65 kg (143 lb)	22 March 2001 (aged 24)	(Sweden) Järnbrotts HK
31	G	Riko Kawaguchi	1.66 m (5 ft 5 in)	71 kg (157 lb)	19 September 2004 (aged 21)	(Japan) Daishin IHC
40	F	Rio Noro	1.64 m (5 ft 5 in)	59 kg (130 lb)	15 May 2004 (aged 21)	(Japan) Daishin IHC
41	F	Riri Noro	1.61 m (5 ft 3 in)	59 kg (130 lb)	15 May 2004 (aged 21)	(Japan) Daishin IHC
91	F	Umeka Odaira	1.62 m (5 ft 4 in)	55 kg (121 lb)	12 December 2008 (aged 17)	(Japan) Daishin IHC

=== Sweden ===
The roster was announced on 12 January 2026.

Head coach: Ulf Lundberg

No.	Pos.	Name	Height	Weight	Birthdate	Team
1	G	Ebba Svensson Träff	1.65 m (5 ft 5 in)	69 kg (152 lb)	27 November 2005 (aged 20)	(Sweden) Linköping HC
4	D	Linnéa Andersson	1.71 m (5 ft 7 in)	64 kg (141 lb)	30 September 1998 (aged 27)	(Sweden) MoDo Hockey
7	D	Mira Jungåker	1.72 m (5 ft 8 in)	70 kg (150 lb)	22 July 2005 (aged 20)	(United States) Ohio State Buckeyes
8	F	Hilda Svensson	1.70 m (5 ft 7 in)	67 kg (148 lb)	24 August 2006 (aged 19)	(United States) Ohio State Buckeyes
9	D	Jessica Adolfsson	1.76 m (5 ft 9 in)	82 kg (181 lb)	15 July 1998 (aged 27)	(Sweden) SDE HF
11	F	Josefin Bouveng	1.75 m (5 ft 9 in)	72 kg (159 lb)	15 May 2001 (aged 24)	(United States) Minnesota Golden Gophers
12	D	Maja Nylén Persson	1.62 m (5 ft 4 in)	66 kg (146 lb)	20 November 2000 (aged 25)	(United States) New York Sirens
14	D	Ida Karlsson	1.75 m (5 ft 9 in)	68 kg (150 lb)	30 June 2004 (aged 21)	(United States) Minnesota Duluth Bulldogs
15	F	Lisa Johansson	1.61 m (5 ft 3 in)	59 kg (130 lb)	11 April 1992 (aged 33)	(Sweden) SDE HF
17	F	Sofie Lundin	1.64 m (5 ft 5 in)	63 kg (139 lb)	15 February 2000 (aged 25)	(Sweden) Frölunda HC
19	F	Sara Hjalmarsson – A	1.76 m (5 ft 9 in)	79 kg (174 lb)	8 February 1998 (aged 27)	(Canada) Toronto Sceptres
22	F	Hanna Thuvik	1.70 m (5 ft 7 in)	75 kg (165 lb)	17 May 2002 (aged 23)	(Sweden) Brynäs IF
23	F	Thea Johansson	1.71 m (5 ft 7 in)	67 kg (148 lb)	22 November 2002 (aged 23)	(United States) Minnesota Duluth Bulldogs
24	F	Ebba Hedqvist	1.68 m (5 ft 6 in)	67 kg (148 lb)	30 September 2006 (aged 19)	(Sweden) MoDo Hockey
25	F	Lina Ljungblom	1.67 m (5 ft 6 in)	77 kg (170 lb)	15 October 2001 (aged 24)	(Canada) Montreal Victoire
26	F	Hanna Olsson – A	1.73 m (5 ft 8 in)	69 kg (152 lb)	20 January 1999 (aged 27)	(Sweden) Frölunda HC
29	F	Felizia Wikner Zienkiewicz	1.70 m (5 ft 7 in)	65 kg (143 lb)	17 September 1999 (aged 26)	(Sweden) Frölunda HC
30	G	Emma Söderberg	1.71 m (5 ft 7 in)	69 kg (152 lb)	18 February 1998 (aged 27)	(Sweden) SDE HF
34	F	Mira Hallin	1.67 m (5 ft 6 in)	65 kg (143 lb)	24 April 2006 (aged 19)	(Sweden) MoDo Hockey
35	G	Tindra Holm	1.72 m (5 ft 8 in)	69 kg (152 lb)	26 May 2001 (aged 24)	(Sweden) MoDo Hockey
55	D	Jenna Raunio	1.74 m (5 ft 9 in)	70 kg (150 lb)	25 September 2006 (aged 19)	(United States) Ohio State Buckeyes
71	D	Anna Kjellbin – C	1.69 m (5 ft 7 in)	63 kg (139 lb)	16 March 1994 (aged 31)	(Canada) Toronto Sceptres
89	F	Nicole Hall	1.66 m (5 ft 5 in)	74 kg (163 lb)	24 March 2004 (aged 21)	(United States) Penn State Nittany Lions
