= 2025 IIHF Women's World Championship Division I =

Tournament details
- Host countries: China; Great Britain
- Venues: 2 (in 2 host cities)
- Dates: 13–19 April; 9–15 April
- Teams: 12

The 2025 IIHF Women's World Championship Division I comprised two international ice hockey tournaments of the 2025 Women's Ice Hockey World Championships organised by the International Ice Hockey Federation (IIHF).

Group A was held in Shenzhen, China from 13 to 19 April and Group B in Dumfries, Great Britain, from 9 to 15 April 2025.

== Group A tournament ==
2025 IIHF Women's World Championship Division I A

Tournament details
- Host country: China
- City: Shenzhen
- Venue: 1 (in 1 host city)
- Dates: 13–19 April
- Teams: 6

Tournament statistics
- Games played: 15
- Goals scored: 68 (4.53 per game)
- Attendance: 9,995 (666 per game)
- Scoring leader: (France) Estelle Duvin (9 points)

Official website
- Website

=== Participants ===
Team	Qualification
China	Host, placed 9th in 2024 Top Division and was relegated.
Denmark	Placed 10th in 2024 Top Division and was relegated.
France	Placed 3rd in 2024 Division I A.
Austria	Placed 4th in 2024 Division I A.
Netherlands	Placed 5th in 2024 Division I A.
Slovakia	Placed 1st in 2024 Division I B and was promoted.

=== Match officials ===
Eight referees and eight linesmen were selected for the tournament.

Referees	Linesmen
(Canada) Jennifer Berezowski; (Canada) Brandy Dewar; (Finland) Kaisa Ketonen; (Germany) Tijana Haack; (Latvia) Agnese Kārkliņa; (Switzerland) Mariko Dale; (United States) Charlotte Hurley; (United States) Chelsea Rapin	(Belgium) Marine Dinant; (Canada) Jessica Chartrand; (Canada) Sophie Thomson; (Czech Republic) Kamila Smetková; (Sweden) Julia Hjelmström; (Switzerland) Jamie Monard; (United States) Kathryn Glover; (United States) Erika Greenen

=== Standings ===
Pos	Team	Pld	W	OTW	OTL	L	GF	GA	GD	Pts	Promotion or relegation
1	Austria	5	4	1	0	0	15	5	+10	14	Promoted to the 2026 Top Division
2	Denmark	5	3	0	0	2	10	8	+2	9 (Note: Denmark 2–0 Slovakia)	Promoted to the 2026 Top Division
3	Slovakia	5	3	0	0	2	14	7	+7	9	
4	France	5	2	1	0	2	15	13	+2	8	
5	China (H)	5	1	0	1	3	4	12	−8	4	
6	Netherlands	5	0	0	1	4	10	23	−13	1	Relegated to the 2026 Division I B

Source: IIHF
Rules for classification: 1) points; 2) head-to-head points; 3) head-to-head goal difference; 4) head-to-head number of goals scored; 5) result against closest best-ranked team outside tied teams; 6) result against second-best ranked team outside tied teams; 7) seeding before tournament.
(H) Host

=== Results ===
All times are local (UTC+8).

13 April 2025; 13:00	Netherlands	3–8 (1–3, 1–4, 1–1)	France	Shenzhen Universiade Sports Centre, Shenzhen; Attendance: 872

Game reference

Eline Gabriele
Arwen ten Cate
Goalies
Alice Philbert
Referees:
(Canada) Jennifer Berezowski
(Switzerland) Mariko Dale
Linesmen:
(Canada) Jessica Chartrand
(Belgium) Marine Dinant

Wielenga (Seppenwolde, Van Nes) (PP2) – 08:08	1–0
	1–1	09:19 – Duvin (SH)
	1–2	15:21 – Aurard (Baudrit)
	1–3	19:39 – Rozier (Leclerc, Aurard)
Van Nes (Wielenga, Seppenwolde) (PP) – 21:07	2–3
	2–4	32:22 – Nonnenmacher (Huot-Marchand, Baudrit)
	2–5	37:02 – Duvin (De Serres, Aurard)
	2–6	38:37 – Le Scodan (Rozier, Duvin)
	2–7	39:36 – Duvin (Aurard)
	2–8	49:52 – Mesplède (Zilliox)
Hamers (Wielenga, Seppenwolde) (PP) – 52:18	3–8

10 min
Penalties
12 min
24
Shots
38

13 April 2025; 16:30	Austria	3–0 (0–0, 1–0, 2–0)	Denmark	Shenzhen Universiade Sports Centre, Shenzhen; Attendance: 738

Game reference

Selma Luggin
Goalies
Emma-Sofie Nordstrøm
Referees:
(Canada) Brandy Dewar
(Germany) Tijana Haack
Linesmen:
(United States) Kathryn Glover
(United States) Erika Greenen

Fazokas (Lintner) – 38:11	1–0
Meixner (Schafzahl, Fazokas) – 45:14	2–0
Schafzahl (Meixner, Fazokas) (EN) – 59:36	3–0

8 min
Penalties
0 min
23
Shots
30

13 April 2025; 20:00	Slovakia	4–0 (1–0, 3–0, 0–0)	China	Shenzhen Universiade Sports Centre, Shenzhen; Attendance: 1,465

Game reference

Lívia Debnárová
Goalies
Zhan Jiahui
Referees:
(United States) Charlotte Hurley
(Latvia) Agnese Kārkliņa
Linesmen:
(Sweden) Julia Hjelmström
(Switzerland) Jamie Monard

Šuliková (Halušková, Ištocyová) (PP) – 11:47	1–0
Hlinková (Fančovičová, Paulínyová) – 29:26	2–0
Tóthová (Košecká, Hlinková) (PP) – 32:02	3–0
Nemčeková (Halušková) – 35:20	4–0

4 min
Penalties
8 min
43
Shots
15

14 April 2025; 13:00	Denmark	6–3 (3–2, 2–0, 1–1)	Netherlands	Shenzhen Universiade Sports Centre, Shenzhen; Attendance: 273

Game reference

Emma-Sofie Nordstrøm
Goalies
Eline Gabriele
Arwen ten Cate
Referees:
(Finland) Kaisa Ketonen
(United States) Chelsea Rapin
Linesmen:
(Czech Republic) Kamila Smetková
(Canada) Sophie Thomson

Sørensen (Glud, Lau) – 02:13	1–0
Foss (Russell) (PP) – 02:56	2–0
	2–1	14:00 – Seppenwolde (Van Nes, Karst)
Glud (Jensen) (SH) – 16:27	3–1
	3–2	16:59 – De Jong (Dijkema, Hamers) (PP)
Glud (Asperup, Jensen) – 31:20	4–2
Glud (Jensen, Asperup) – 34:25	5–2
Bergmann (Asperup, Jensen) (PP) – 52:48	6–2
	6–3	54:42 – Van Nes (Hamers, Hardenbol) (PP)

8 min
Penalties
8 min
31
Shots
35

14 April 2025; 16:30	France	1–4 (1–0, 0–3, 0–1)	Slovakia	Shenzhen Universiade Sports Centre, Shenzhen; Attendance: 312

Game reference

Alice Philbert
Goalies
Lívia Debnárová
Referees:
(Canada) Jennifer Berezowski
(Latvia) Agnese Kārkliņa
Linesmen:
(Canada) Jessica Chartrand
(Belgium) Marine Dinant

Duvin (Rozier) – 08:36	1–0
	1–1	28:07 – Leskovjanská (Košecká, Hlinková) (EA)
	1–2	36:10 – Kapičáková (Hlinková, Lopušanová)
	1–3	39:10 – Halušková (Tóthová, Matejková)
	1–4	52:25 – Matejková (Halušková, Drábeková) (PP)

4 min
Penalties
6 min
39
Shots
32

14 April 2025; 20:00	China	0–3 (0–1, 0–1, 0–1)	Austria	Shenzhen Universiade Sports Centre, Shenzhen; Attendance: 423

Game reference

Zhan Jiahui
Goalies
Selma Luggin
Referees:
(Switzerland) Mariko Dale
(Canada) Brandy Dewar
Linesmen:
(United States) Kathryn Glover
(United States) Erika Greenen

0–1	08:13 – Meixner (Nagy)
0–2	27:47 – Lintner (Trummer)
0–3	47:10 – Fazokas (Meixner, Schafzahl) (PP)

6 min
Penalties
6 min
11
Shots
47

16 April 2025; 13:00	Slovakia	2–3 (1–1, 1–0, 1–2)	Austria	Shenzhen Universiade Sports Centre, Shenzhen; Attendance: 231

Game reference

Lívia Debnárová
Goalies
Selma Luggin
Referees:
(United States) Charlotte Hurley
(United States) Chelsea Rapin
Linesmen:
(Sweden) Julia Hjelmström
(Czech Republic) Kamila Smetková

	0–1	13:49 – Trummer (Schafzahl, Meixner) (PP)
Fančovičová (Beňáková, Halušková) – 14:18	1–1
Fančovičová (Paulínyová, Gálisová) – 22:38	2–1
	2–2	51:04 – Meixner (Schafzahl, Fazokas) (PP)
	2–3	59:27 – Meixner (Luggin) (PP)

12 min
Penalties
6 min
20
Shots
30

16 April 2025; 16:30	Denmark	1–2 (0–1, 0–0, 1–1)	France	Shenzhen Universiade Sports Centre, Shenzhen; Attendance: 263

Game reference

Emma-Sofie Nordstrøm
Goalies
Alice Philbert
Referees:
(Latvia) Agnese Kārkliņa
(Finland) Kaisa Ketonen
Linesmen:
(United States) Erika Greenen
(Switzerland) Jamie Monard

	0–1	13:40 – Rozier (Duvin, Leclerc)
	0–2	40:29 – Rozier (Duvin, Aurard)
Bergmann (Ranum, Glud) (PP, EA) – 59:52	1–2

14 min
Penalties
10 min
28
Shots
37

16 April 2025; 20:00	China	2–1 (0–1, 1–0, 1–0)	Netherlands	Shenzhen Universiade Sports Centre, Shenzhen; Attendance: 416

Game reference

Zhan Jiahui
Goalies
Eline Gabriele
Referees:
(Canada) Brandy Dewar
(Germany) Tijana Haack
Linesmen:
(United States) Kathryn Glover
(Canada) Sophie Thomson

	0–1	02:43 – Collard (De Jong, Dijkema)
Qu (Wang J., Kong) – 39:34	1–1
Zhang (PS) – 43:42	2–1

6 min
Penalties
2 min
28
Shots
23

17 April 2025; 13:00	Denmark	2–0 (0–0, 2–0, 0–0)	Slovakia	Shenzhen Universiade Sports Centre, Shenzhen; Attendance: 184

Game reference
Emma-Sofie Nordstrøm	Goalies	Lívia Debnárová	Referees: (Canada) Jennifer Berezowski (United States) Charlotte Hurley; Linesmen: (Canada) Jessica Chartrand (Belgium) Marine Dinant
Glud (Lau, Jensen) – 20:36 / 1–0; Foss (Peters, Oksbjerg) – 25:35 / 2–0			Referees: (Canada) Jennifer Berezowski (United States) Charlotte Hurley; Linesmen: (Canada) Jessica Chartrand (Belgium) Marine Dinant
6 min	Penalties	8 min	Referees: (Canada) Jennifer Berezowski (United States) Charlotte Hurley; Linesmen: (Canada) Jessica Chartrand (Belgium) Marine Dinant
15	Shots	35	Referees: (Canada) Jennifer Berezowski (United States) Charlotte Hurley; Linesmen: (Canada) Jessica Chartrand (Belgium) Marine Dinant

17 April 2025; 16:30	Austria	3–2 OT (0–1, 1–1, 1–0) (OT: 1–0)	Netherlands	Shenzhen Universiade Sports Centre, Shenzhen; Attendance: 211

Game reference

Selma Luggin
Goalies
Eline Gabriele
Referees:
(Switzerland) Mariko Dale
(Finland) Kaisa Ketonen
Linesmen:
(Switzerland) Jamie Monard
(Czech Republic) Kamila Smetková

	0–1	12:08 – De Jong (Hamers, Dijkema)
	0–2	25:34 – Van Nes (Wielenga, Hamers)
Lintner (Obermayr, Billa) – 33:11	1–2
Fazokas (Meixner, Matzka) – 45:23	2–2
Fazokas (Lintner, Trummer) – 63:32	3–2

10 min
Penalties
6 min
50
Shots
23

17 April 2025; 20:00	France	3–2 GWS (1–2, 0–0, 1–0) (OT: 0–0) (SO: 1–0)	China	Shenzhen Universiade Sports Centre, Shenzhen; Attendance: 1,343

Game reference

Alice Philbert
Goalies
Zhan Jiahui
Referees:
(Germany) Tijana Haack
(United States) Chelsea Rapin
(Latvia) Agnese Kārkliņa
Linesmen:
(Sweden) Julia Hjelmström
(Canada) Sophie Thomson

	0–1	00:27 – Fang (Qu)
Aurard (Leclerc, Duvin) – 07:10	1–1
	1–2	16:44 – Zhang (Du, Kong)
Villiot (Rozier, Aurard) (EA) – 57:43	2–2

Duvin (miss)
Le Scodan (miss)
Villiot (miss)
Mesplède (miss)
De Serres (miss)
Duvin (miss)
Baudrit (miss)
Duvin
Shootout
(miss) Kong
(miss) Fang
(miss) Wen
(miss) Zhang
(miss) Yang
(miss) Fang
(miss) Qu
(miss) Kong
2 min
Penalties
8 min
51
Shots
21

19 April 2025; 13:00	Netherlands	1–4 (0–0, 0–1, 1–3)	Slovakia	Shenzhen Universiade Sports Centre, Shenzhen; Attendance: 327

Game reference

Arwen ten Cate
Goalies
Lívia Debnárová
Referees:
(Canada) Brandy Dewar
(United States) Chelsea Rapin
Linesmen:
(United States) Erika Greenen
(Czech Republic) Kamila Smetková

	0–1	27:24 – Ištocyová (Matejková
	0–2	40:34 – Kapičáková (Halušková, Leskovjanská)
	0–3	50:48 – Tóthová (Kapičáková, Hlinková) (PP)
	0–4	51:05 – Beňáková (Lopušanová)
Wielenga (Seppenwolde, Huisman) (PP) – 56:14	1–4

2 min
Penalties
6 min
21
Shots
27

19 April 2025; 16:30	France	1–3 (0–0, 0–1, 1–2)	Austria	Shenzhen Universiade Sports Centre, Shenzhen; Attendance: 411

Game reference

Alice Philbert
Goalies
Selma Luggin
Referees:
(United States) Charlotte Hurley
(Latvia) Agnese Kārkliņa
Linesmen:
(United States) Kathryn Glover
(Canada) Sophie Thomson

	0–1	24:30 – Lintner (Matzka, Wittich) (PP)
	0–2	46:51 – Lisa Schröfl (Linzbichler, Grascher)
	0–3	56:14 – Schafzahl
Rozier (Duvin, de Serres) (PP) – 59:41	1–3

24 min
Penalties
20 min
31
Shots
25

19 April 2025; 20:00	China	0–1 (0–0, 0–0, 0–1)	Denmark	Shenzhen Universiade Sports Centre, Shenzhen; Attendance: 2,526

Game reference
Zhan Jiahui	Goalies	Emma-Sofie Nordstrøm	Referees: (Canada) Jennifer Berezowski (Switzerland) Mariko Dale; Linesmen: (Canada) Jessica Chartrand (Sweden) Julia Hjelmström
0–1 / 53:51 – Jensen (Asperup, Glud)			Referees: (Canada) Jennifer Berezowski (Switzerland) Mariko Dale; Linesmen: (Canada) Jessica Chartrand (Sweden) Julia Hjelmström
2 min	Penalties	4 min	Referees: (Canada) Jennifer Berezowski (Switzerland) Mariko Dale; Linesmen: (Canada) Jessica Chartrand (Sweden) Julia Hjelmström
12	Shots	24	Referees: (Canada) Jennifer Berezowski (Switzerland) Mariko Dale; Linesmen: (Canada) Jessica Chartrand (Sweden) Julia Hjelmström

=== Statistics ===
==== Scoring leaders ====
List shows the top skaters sorted by points, then goals.

Note: Pos = Position; GP = Games played; G = Goals; A = Assists; Pts = Points; PIM = Penalty minutes;

Player	GP	G	A	Pts	+/−	PIM	POS
(France) Estelle Duvin	5	4	5	9	+4	4	F
(Austria) Anna Meixner	5	4	4	8	+4	2	F
(Austria) Annika Fazokas	5	4	3	7	+5	4	D
(Denmark) Silke Lave Glud	5	4	3	7	+5	2	F
(France) Clara Rozier	5	4	3	7	+3	4	F
(France) Chloé Aurard	5	2	5	7	+3	20	F
(Austria) Theresa Schafzahl	5	2	4	6	+5	10	F
(Slovakia) Lucia Halušková	5	1	5	6	+4	2	F
(Denmark) Nicoline Jensen	5	1	5	6	+3	4	F
(Austria) Emma Lintner	5	3	2	5	+3	2	F
(Netherlands) Bieke van Nes	5	3	2	5	−6	4	F

Source: IIHF.com

==== Goaltending leaders ====
Only the top five goaltenders, based on save percentage, who have played at least 40% of their team's minutes, are included in this list.

Note: GP = Games played; Min, TOI = Minutes played; W = Wins; L = Losses; T,T/OT = Ties; OTL = Overtime losses; GA = Goals-against; GAA = Goals-against average; SO = Shutouts; SV% = Save percentage;

Player	TOI	GA	GAA	SA	Sv%	SO
(Austria) Selma Luggin	303:32	5	0.99	115	95.65	2
(Denmark) Emma-Sofie Nordstrøm	296:42	7	1.42	139	94.96	2
(Slovakia) Lívia Debnárová	299:49	7	1.40	120	94.17	1
(China) Zhan Jiahui	303:16	11	2.18	187	94.12	0
(France) Alice Philbert	304:05	12	2.37	129	90.70	0

Source: IIHF.com

=== Awards ===
Position	Player
Goaltender	(Austria) Selma Luggin
Defenceman	(Austria) Annika Fazokas
Forward	(France) Estelle Duvin

== Group B tournament ==
2025 IIHF Women's World Championship Division I B

Tournament details
- Host country: Great Britain
- City: Dumfries
- Venue: 1 (in 1 host city)
- Dates: 9–15 April
- Teams: 6

Tournament statistics
- Games played: 15
- Goals scored: 103 (6.87 per game)
- Attendance: 3,298 (220 per game)
- Scoring leader: (Italy) Matilde Fantin (10 points)

Official website
- Website

=== Participants ===
Team	Qualification
South Korea	Placed 6th in 2024 Division I A and was relegated.
Latvia	Placed 2nd in 2024 Division I B.
Italy	Placed 3rd in 2024 Division I B.
Great Britain	Host, placed 4th in 2024 Division I B.
Slovenia	Placed 5th in 2024 Division I B.
Kazakhstan	Placed 1st in 2024 Division II A and was promoted.

=== Match officials ===
Eight referees and eight linesmen were selected for the tournament.

Referees	Linesmen
(Canada) Grace Barlow; (Finland) Linnea Marin; (Germany) Caroline Butt; (Latvia) Sintija Čamane; (Sweden) Veronica Lovensnö; (Switzerland) Reica Staiger; (United States) Michaela Bahl; (United States) Rylie Lissebeck	(Denmark) Cassandra Repstock-Romme; (Finland) Helinä Anttila; (Finland) Johanna Oksanen; (Norway) Anette Fjeldstad; (Norway) Maren Frøhaug; (Slovakia) Eva Moleková; (Switzerland) Domenica Maurer; (United States) Breana Kraut

=== Standings ===
Pos	Team	Pld	W	OTW	OTL	L	GF	GA	GD	Pts	Promotion or relegation
1	Italy	5	5	0	0	0	31	0	+31	15	Promoted to the 2026 Division I A
2	Latvia	5	4	0	0	1	24	12	+12	12	
3	Great Britain (H)	5	2	0	1	2	12	12	0	7	
4	Kazakhstan	5	2	0	0	3	16	14	+2	6	
5	South Korea	5	1	1	0	3	12	19	−7	5	
6	Slovenia	5	0	0	0	5	8	46	−38	0	Relegated to the 2026 Division II A

Source: IIHF
Rules for classification: 1) points; 2) head-to-head points; 3) head-to-head goal difference; 4) head-to-head number of goals scored; 5) result against closest best-ranked team outside tied teams; 6) result against second-best ranked team outside tied teams; 7) seeding before tournament.
(H) Host

=== Results ===
All times are local (UTC+1).

9 April 2025; 13:00	Kazakhstan	4–2 (1–1, 1–0, 2–1)	South Korea	Ice Bowl, Dumfries; Attendance: 228

Game reference

Arina Chshyokolova
Goalies
Kim Yeon-ju
Referees:
(Latvia) Sintija Čamane
(Switzerland) Reica Staiger
Linesmen:
(Finland) Helinä Anttila
(Switzerland) Domenica Maurer

	0–1	11:25 – Park Jo. (Lee Eun-ji)
Butorina (Zubkova) – 14:33	1–1
M. Sayakhatkyzy (D. Sayakhatkyzy, Zubkova) – 33:32	2–1
	2–2	40:20 – Lee Eun-ji (Park Jo.)
Filimonova (Kutsenko) – 42:37	3–2
Pyatkova (Olzhabayeva) (PP2) – 49:14	4–2

2 min
Penalties
8 min
20
Shots
38

9 April 2025; 16:30	Slovenia	0–12 (0–3, 0–5, 0–4)	Italy	Ice Bowl, Dumfries; Attendance: 134

Game reference

Tjaša Intihar
Goalies
Martina Fedel
Referees:
(United States) Michaela Bahl
(United States) Rylie Lissebeck
Linesmen:
(United States) Breana Kraut
(Finland) Johanna Oksanen

0–1	06:26 – Saletta (Guerriero, Roccella)
0–2	07:30 – Abatangelo (Fantin)
0–3	15:23 – Gius (Mazzocchi, Bonafini)
0–4	25:14 – Abatangelo (Fantin, Tutino)
0–5	30:34 – Stocker (Heidenberger, Guerriero) (PP)
0–6	35:30 – Varano (Gius, Niccolai)
0–7	36:23 – Roccella (Saletta, Fedel)
0–8	39:30 – Heidenberger (Mattivi, Stocker)
0–9	49:24 – Saletta (Roccella)
0–10	50:41 – Fantin (Heidenberger, Stocker)
0–11	51:41 – Varano (Guerriero, Bonafini)
0–12	55:02 – Campo Bagatin (Roccella, Bedont)

4 min
Penalties
12 min
12
Shots
70

9 April 2025; 20:00	Great Britain	0–3 (0–0, 0–2, 0–1)	Latvia	Ice Bowl, Dumfries; Attendance: 336

Game reference

Nicole Jackson
Goalies
Kristiāna Apsīte
Referees:
(Germany) Caroline Butt
(Sweden) Veronica Lovensnö
Linesmen:
(Norway) Maren Frøhaug
(Slovakia) Eva Moleková

0–1	33:59 – Šilajāne (Rulle)
0–2	38:34 – Šilajāne (Lagzdiņa)
0–3	55:17 – Miljone (A. Apsīte)

8 min
Penalties
6 min
56
Shots
21

10 April 2025; 13:00	Italy	2–0 (1–0, 0–0, 1–0)	Kazakhstan	Ice Bowl, Dumfries; Attendance: 301

Game reference
Martina Fedel	Goalies	Arina Chshyokolova	Referees: (Canada) Grace Barlow (Germany) Caroline Butt; Linesmen: (Norway) Anette Fjeldstad (Denmark) Cassandra Repstock-Romme
Della Rovere (Mattivi, Fantin) (PP) – 04:06 / 1–0; Abatangelo (Della Rovere, Guerriero) – 54:45 / 2–0			Referees: (Canada) Grace Barlow (Germany) Caroline Butt; Linesmen: (Norway) Anette Fjeldstad (Denmark) Cassandra Repstock-Romme
6 min	Penalties	6 min	Referees: (Canada) Grace Barlow (Germany) Caroline Butt; Linesmen: (Norway) Anette Fjeldstad (Denmark) Cassandra Repstock-Romme
35	Shots	19	Referees: (Canada) Grace Barlow (Germany) Caroline Butt; Linesmen: (Norway) Anette Fjeldstad (Denmark) Cassandra Repstock-Romme

10 April 2025; 16:30	Latvia	11–2 (5–0, 3–1, 3–1)	Slovenia	Ice Bowl, Dumfries; Attendance: 123

Game reference

Kristiāna Apsīte
Guna Gailīte
Goalies
Tjaša Intihar
Referees:
(Sweden) Veronica Lovensnö
(Finland) Linnea Marin
Linesmen:
(Norway) Maren Frøhaug
(United States) Breana Kraut

Rulle – 02:23	1–0
Kubliņa (Miljone) (PP) – 05:40	2–0
Yip-Chuck – 12:44	3–0
Rulle (Jakovļeva) (PP) – 17:26	4–0
Jakovļeva (Rulle) – 19:55	5–0
Lagzdiņa (Rulle, Šilajāne) – 25:14	6–0
	6–1	26:09 – Blazinšek (Confidenti, Pren))
Miljone (SH) – 32:03	7–1
Lukaševiča – 37:32	8–1
Rulle (Šilajāne, Lagzdiņa) – 48:12	9–1
Yip-Chuc (Miljone) – 48:47	10–1
	10–2	51:57 – Pezdir (Buljeta, Golob)
Šardina – 55:28	11–2

6 min
Penalties
14 min
50
Shots
27

10 April 2025; 20:00	South Korea	3–2 OT (0–2, 1–0, 1–0) (OT: 1–0)	Great Britain	Ice Bowl, Dumfries; Attendance: 352

Game reference

Ahn Se-won
Goalies
Ella Howard
Referees:
(United States) Michaela Bahl
(Switzerland) Reica Staiger
Linesmen:
(Finland) Helinä Anttila
(Finland) Johanna Oksanen

	0–1	10:26 – Adams (Mardsen) (PP)
	0–2	16:38 – Rees
Lee S. (Han S.) (PP) – 24:38	1–2
Jung S. (Lee S.) – 53:37	2–2
Lee E. (Park Ji.) (PP) – 61:24	3–2

6 min
Penalties
8 min
33
Shots
21

12 April 2025; 13:00	South Korea	6–3 (2–1, 2–1, 2–1)	Slovenia	Ice Bowl, Dumfries; Attendance: 143

Game reference

Ahn Se-won
Goalies
Tjaša Intihar
Referees:
(Canada) Grace Barlow
(Finland) Linnea Marin
Linesmen:
(Norway) Maren Frøhaug
(Denmark) Cassandra Repstock-Romme

	0–1	00:55 – Nylaander
Park Ju. (Park Jo.) – 02:29	1–1
Kim T. (Park Jo., Lee Eun-ji) (PP) – 12:45	2–1
Han S. – 31:23	3–1
	3–2	33:02 – Confidenti (Maver, Porekar)
Han S. (PP) – 39:29	4–2
	4–3	43:42 – Blazinšek
Kim T. (Lee Eun-ji, Park Jo.) (PP) – 49:48	5–3
Han S. (Lee Eun-ji, Lee S.) (PP) – 54:43	6–3

4 min
Penalties
14 min
37
Shots
15

12 April 2025; 16:30	Latvia	0–6 (0–2, 0–2, 0–2)	Italy	Ice Bowl, Dumfries

Game reference

Kristiāna Apsīte
Goalies
Martina Fedel
Referees:
(Germany) Caroline Butt
(Switzerland) Reica Staiger
Linesmen:
(Slovakia) Eva Moleková
(Finland) Johanna Oksanen

0–1	12:09 – Fantin (Tutino)
0–2	19:52 – Caumo
0–3	25:05 – Varano (Roccella)
0–4	36:43 – Stocker (Heidenberger, Abatangelo) (PP)
0–5	47:45 – Della Rovere (Fantin) (PP)
0–6	56:13 – Fantin (Bedont, Rindone)

14 min
Penalties
12 min
13
Shots
48

12 April 2025; 20:00	Kazakhstan	0–2 (0–1, 0–2, 0–1)	Great Britain	Ice Bowl, Dumfries; Attendance: 322

Game reference
Arina Chshyokolova	Goalies	Nicole Jackson	Referees: (Latvia) Sintija Čamane (United States) Rylie Lissebeck; Linesmen: (Norway) Anette Fjeldstad (Switzerland) Domenica Maurer
0–1 / 17:08 – Wallace (Horwood); 0–2 / 46:36 – C. Jackson (Adams, (Mardsen)			Referees: (Latvia) Sintija Čamane (United States) Rylie Lissebeck; Linesmen: (Norway) Anette Fjeldstad (Switzerland) Domenica Maurer
6 min	Penalties	8 min	Referees: (Latvia) Sintija Čamane (United States) Rylie Lissebeck; Linesmen: (Norway) Anette Fjeldstad (Switzerland) Domenica Maurer
20	Shots	31	Referees: (Latvia) Sintija Čamane (United States) Rylie Lissebeck; Linesmen: (Norway) Anette Fjeldstad (Switzerland) Domenica Maurer

13 April 2025; 13:00	Italy	7–0 (3–0, 3–0, 1–0)	South Korea	Ice Bowl, Dumfries; Attendance: 241

Game reference

Martina Fedel
Goalies
Ahn Se-won
Kim Yeon-ju
Referees:
(United States) Michaela Bahl
(Canada) Grace Barlow
Linesmen:
(Slovakia) Eva Moleková
(Denmark) Cassandra Repstock-Romme

Bedont (Gius) – 02:02	1–0
Guerriero (Heidenberger) – 12:41	2–0
Fantin (Tutino) – 19:42	3–0
Abatangelo (Della Rovere, Caumo) – 28:48	4–0
Heidenberger (Guerriero) – 37:12	5–0
Bonafini (Mattivi, Gius) – 37:59	6–0
Varano (Tutino, Guerriero) – 57:34	7–0

4 min
Penalties
2 min
40
Shots
16

13 April 2025; 16:30	Latvia	7–3 (2–0, 1–3, 4–0)	Kazakhstan	Ice Bowl, Dumfries; Attendance: 186

Game reference

Kristiāna Apsīte
Goalies
Arina Chshyokolova
Referees:
(United States) Rylie Lissebeck
(Finland) Linnea Marin
Linesmen:
(United States) Breana Kraut
(Switzerland) Domenica Maurer

Štrause (Želubovska) – 01:58	1–0
Miljone – 17:38	2–0
	2–1	25:41 – M. Sayakhatkyzy (Butorina, Shegay)
	2–2	28:41 – Tursynova
	2–3	30:49 – Zubkova
Yip-Chuck (Miljone) – 33:07	3–3
Yip-Chuck (SH) – 43:32	4–3
Lagzdiņa (Kubliņa, Šilajāne) (PP) – 46:10	5–3
Šilajāne – 51:18	6–3
Miljone (Yip-Chuck) (PP) – 53:59	7–3

4 min
Penalties
8 min
40
Shots
34

13 April 2025; 20:00	Great Britain	8–2 (1–0, 3–1, 4–1)	Slovenia	Ice Bowl, Dumfries; Attendance: 375

Game reference

Nicole Jackson
Goalies
Tjaša Intihar
Referees:
(Latvia) Sintija Čamane
(Sweden) Veronica Lovensnö
Linesmen:
(Finland) Helinä Anttila
(Norway) Anette Fjeldstad

Newlands – 16:31	1–0
	1–1	21:26 – Confidenti (Buljeta, Pren)
Marsden (Newlands) – 22:36	2–1
Traill (Adams) – 23:15	3–1
Mullen (Horwood, Lamberton) – 32:04	4–1
	4–2	41:59 – Confidenti (Buljeta, Pren)
C. Jackson (Hill, Alderson-Smith) – 44:29	5–2
Alderson-Smith – 47:27	6–2
Adams (Marsden, Newlands) – 49:37	7–2
Cartwright (Wallace) – 57:25	8–2

10 min
Penalties
4 min
51
Shots
23

15 April 2025; 13:00	Slovenia	1–9 (0–1, 0–5, 1–3)	Kazakhstan	Ice Bowl, Dumfries; Attendance: 130

Game reference

Tjaša Intihar
Jera Vovk
Goalies

Referees:
(United States) Michaela Bahl
(Sweden) Veronica Lovensnö
Linesmen:
(United States) Breana Kraut
(Slovakia) Eva Moleková

	0–1	12:29 – Kutsenko (Voronova)
	0–2	21:26 – Moldabay (Orazbayeva)
	0–3	33:29 – Pyatkova (PP)
	0–4	35:19 – Ashimova (Filimonova, Aldabergenova)
	0–5	36:22 – Moldabay (Kutsenko)
	0–6	37:25 – Voronova (Butorina) (PP)
	0–7	44:52 – Orazbayeva (Shegay)
Confidenti (SH) – 46:15	1–7
	1–8	58:17 – Koroleva (Yakovleva) (PP)
	1–9	59:31 – Kutsenko (D. Sayakhatkyzy)

12 min
Penalties
8 min
16
Shots
55

15 April 2025; 16:30	South Korea	1–3 (1–1, 0–1, 0–1)	Latvia	Ice Bowl, Dumfries

Game reference

Ahn Se-won
Goalies
Kristiāna Apsīte
Referees:
(United States) Rylie Lissebeck
(Switzerland) Reica Staiger
Linesmen:
(Finland) Helinä Anttila
(Finland) Johanna Oksanen

Lee Eun-ji (Han Y.) – 08:54	1–0
	1–1	16:42 – Štrause (Želubovska)
	1–2	24:43 – Miljone (Yip-Chuck) (PP)
	1–3	59:33 – Želubovska (Kubliņa) (PP)

8 min
Penalties
10 min
48
Shots
17

15 April 2025; 20:00	Italy	4–0 (1–0, 2–0, 1–0)	Great Britain	Ice Bowl, Dumfries; Attendance: 427

Game reference

Margherita Ostoni
Goalies
Nicole Jackson
Referees:
(Canada) Grace Barlow
(Germany) Caroline Butt
Linesmen:
(Norway) Anette Fjeldstad
(Norway) Maren Frøhaug

Fantin (Della Rovere, Mattivi) (PP) – 14:58	1–0
Caumo (Guerriero) – 32:11	2–0
Caumo (Della Rovere) – 35:10	3–0
Tutino (Fantin, Della Rovere) (PP) – 45:25	4–0

2 min
Penalties
10 min
51
Shots
12

=== Statistics ===
==== Scoring leaders ====
List shows the top skaters sorted by points, then goals.

Note: Pos = Position; GP = Games played; G = Goals; A = Assists; Pts = Points; PIM = Penalty minutes;

Player	GP	G	A	Pts	+/−	PIM	POS
(Italy) Matilde Fantin	5	5	5	10	+9	2	F
(Latvia) Līga Miljone	5	5	3	8	+4	10	F
(Italy) Kristen Guerriero	5	1	7	8	+13	2	D
(Italy) Kristin Della Rovere	5	2	5	7	+6	6	F
(Latvia) Krista Yip-Chuck	5	4	2	6	+1	2	F
(South Korea) Lee Eun-ji	5	3	3	6	−2	0	F
(Latvia) Linda Rulle	5	3	3	6	+4	10	F
(Latvia) Karīna Šilajāne	5	3	3	6	+6	2	F
(Italy) Manuela Heidenberger	5	2	4	6	+7	2	F
(Italy) Aurora Abatangelo	5	4	1	5	+11	0	F
(Slovenia) Sara Confidenti	5	4	1	5	−8	2	F

Source: IIHF.com

==== Goaltending leaders ====
Only the top five goaltenders, based on save percentage, who have played at least 40% of their team's minutes, are included in this list.

Note: GP = Games played; Min, TOI = Minutes played; W = Wins; L = Losses; T,T/OT = Ties; OTL = Overtime losses; GA = Goals-against; GAA = Goals-against average; SO = Shutouts; SV% = Save percentage;

Player	TOI	GA	GAA	SA	Sv%	SO
(Italy) Martina Fedel	240:00	0	0.00	60	100.00	4
(Latvia) Kristiāna Apsīte	280:00	11	2.36	205	94.63	1
(United Kingdom) Nicole Jackson	240:00	9	2.25	115	92.17	1
(Kazakhstan) Arina Chshyokolova	300:00	14	2.80	160	91.25	0
(South Korea) Ahn Se-won	232:41	14	3.61	85	83.53	0

Source: IIHF.com

=== Awards ===
Position	Player
Goaltender	(Latvia) Kristiāna Apsīte
Defenceman	(Italy) Nadia Mattivi
Forward	(Italy) Matilde Fantin
