= 2024 IIHF U18 Women's World Championship Division I =

2024 IIHF World Women's U18 Championship Division I
Tournament details
- Host countries: Italy; Spain
- Venues: 2 (in 2 host cities)
- Dates: 6–12 January 2024; 8–14 January 2024
- Teams: 12

The 2024 IIHF U18 Women's World Championship Division I was two international under-18 women's ice hockey tournaments organized by the International Ice Hockey Federation (IIHF). Divisions I A and I B represent the second and the third tier of competition at the 2024 IIHF U18 Women's World Championship.

== Group A tournament ==
2024 IIHF World Women's U18 Championship Division I Group A

Tournament details
- Host country: Italy
- City: Neumarkt, South Tyrol
- Venue: 1 (in 1 host city)
- Dates: 6–12 January 2024
- Teams: 6

Tournament statistics
- Games played: 15
- Goals scored: 68 (4.53 per game)
- Attendance: 2,661 (177 per game)
- Scoring leader: (Italy) Matilde Fantin (11 points)

Official website
- Official website

The Division I Group A tournament was played in Egna (Neumarkt), Italy, from 6 to 12 January 2024. Japan was the tournament champion and earned promotion to the Top Division tournament of the 2025 IIHF U18 Women's World Championship.

=== Participating teams ===
| Team | Qualification |
|---|---|
| Japan | 8th place in 2023 World Championship Top Division and were relegated |
| Italy | Hosts; 2nd place in 2023 World Championship Division I A |
| France | 3rd place in 2023 World Championship Division I A |
| Hungary | 4th place in 2023 World Championship Division I A |
| Austria | 5th place in 2023 World Championship Division I A |
| Denmark | 1st place in 2023 World Championship Division I B and were promoted |

=== Standings ===
| Pos | Team | Pld | W | OTW | OTL | L | GF | GA | GD | Pts | Promotion or relegation |
|---|---|---|---|---|---|---|---|---|---|---|---|
| 1 | Japan | 5 | 5 | 0 | 0 | 0 | 21 | 4 | +17 | 15 | Promoted to the 2025 Top Division |
| 2 | Italy (H) | 5 | 3 | 0 | 1 | 1 | 15 | 13 | +2 | 10 | |
| 3 | Hungary | 5 | 2 | 1 | 0 | 2 | 8 | 8 | 0 | 8 | |
| 4 | Austria | 5 | 1 | 2 | 1 | 1 | 10 | 11 | −1 | 8 | |
| 5 | France | 5 | 1 | 0 | 0 | 4 | 8 | 14 | −6 | 3 | |
| 6 | Denmark | 5 | 0 | 0 | 1 | 4 | 6 | 18 | −12 | 1 | Relegated to the 2025 Division I B |

Source: IIHF
Rules for classification: 1) points; 2) head-to-head points; 3) head-to-head goal difference; 4) head-to-head number of goals scored; 5) result against closest best-ranked team outside tied teams; 6) result against second-best ranked team outside tied teams; 7) seeding before tournament.
(H) Host

=== Schedule ===
All times are local (Central European Time – UTC+01:00).

| 6 January 2024; 12:30 | Austria | 2–1 (1–0, 0–0, 1–1) | France | Sportarena Unterland, Egna; Attendance: 107 |

Game reference

Karla Kronberger
Goalies
Violette Pianel Couriaut
Referee:
(Latvia) Sintija Čamane
Linesmen:
(Norway) Anette Fjeldstad
(Hungary) Bernadett Holzer

| Frieß (Danninger, Prosen) – 18:33 | 1–0 |
| Billa – 46:47 | 2–0 |
| | 2–1 | 47:38 – Chabert (Bontemps) |

2 min
Penalties
2 min
19
Shots
25

| 6 January 2024; 16:00 | Denmark | 1–4 (1–3, 0–0, 0–1) | Japan | Sportarena Unterland, Egna; Attendance: 98 |

Game reference

Anja Poulsen
Goalies
Haruka Kuromaru
Referee:
(United States) Sydney Harris
Linesmen:
(Canada) Melissa Brunn
(United States) Abigail Torres

| Ranum (Bergmann) – 01:22 | 1–0 |
| | 1–1 | 05:27 – Odermatt (Sone) |
| | 1–2 | 07:27 – Homma (K. Sato) |
| | 1–3 | 12:39 – K. Sato |
| | 1–4 | 52:59 – N. Okumura (Odaira) |

6 min
Penalties
6 min
12
Shots
43

| 6 January 2024; 19:30 | Hungary | 0–4 (0–1, 0–2, 0–1) | Italy | Sportarena Unterland, Egna; Attendance: 287 |

Game reference

Noémi Takács
Goalies
Margherita Ostoni
Referee:
(Switzerland) Reica Staiger
Linesmen:
(United States) Kathryn Glover
(United States) Danika Korpacz

| 0–1 | 09:06 – Heidenberger (Bedont) |
| 0–2 | 24:17 – Fantin (Heidenberger, Bedont) |
| 0–3 | 33:16 – Fantin (Heidenberger) |
| 0–4 | 58:37 – Fantin (SH; ENG) |

6 min
Penalties
8 min
27
Shots
16

| 7 January 2024; 12:30 | France | 3–1 (1–0, 2–0, 0–1) | Denmark | Sportarena Unterland, Egna; Attendance: 101 |

Game reference

Violette Pianel Couriaut
Goalies
Anja Poulsen
Referee:
(Switzerland) Reica Staiger
Linesmen:
(United States) Danika Korpacz
(United States) Abigail Torres

| Apertet (Origlio) – 07:42 | 1–0 |
| Origlio (Boudin) – 24:38 | 2–0 |
| Piazzon – 28:17 | 3–0 |
| | 3–1 | 55:10 – Olesen (Ranum, Dahlmann) |

8 min
Penalties
8 min
36
Shots
16

| 7 January 2024; 16:00 | Italy | 3–4 GWS (0–0, 3–1, 0–2) (OT: 0–0) (SO: 0–1) | Austria | Sportarena Unterland, Egna; Attendance: 457 |

Game reference

Margherita Ostoni
Goalies
Rosina Fichtinger
Referee:
(United States) Sydney Harris
Linesmen:
(United States) Kathryn Glover
(Hungary) Bernadett Holzer

| Heidenberger (Cambruzzi, Bedont) – 20:53 | 1–0 |
| Fantin (PP) – 26:16 | 2–0 |
| Fantin (Cambruzzi, Todesco) – 33:48 | 3–0 |
| | 3–1 | 39:35 – Danninger (Leitner) (PP) |
| | 3–2 | 51:43 – Tekin (Billa, Unger) (PP) |
| | 3–3 | 58:24 – Henek (Lintner, Tekin) |

Cambruzzi (miss)
Fantin (miss)
Heidenberger (miss)
Weber (miss)
Bedont (miss)
Fantin (miss)
Heidenberger (miss)
Shootout
(miss) Prosen
(miss) Lintner
(miss) Hobitsch
(miss) Billa
(miss) Picka
(miss) Unger
Nagy
14 min
Penalties
12 min
30
Shots
34

| 7 January 2024; 19:30 | Japan | 2–0 (2–0, 0–0, 0–0) | Hungary | Sportarena Unterland, Egna; Attendance: 102 |

Game reference
| Haruka Kuromaru | Goalies | Noémi Takács | Referee: (Latvia) Sintija Čamane; Linesmen: (Canada) Melissa Brunn (Norway) Anette Fjeldstad |
| Akimoto – 15:42 / 1–0; A. Tada (Numabe, Terauchi) (PP) – 18:05 / 2–0 | | | Referee: (Latvia) Sintija Čamane; Linesmen: (Canada) Melissa Brunn (Norway) Anette Fjeldstad |
| 12 min | Penalties | 4 min | Referee: (Latvia) Sintija Čamane; Linesmen: (Canada) Melissa Brunn (Norway) Anette Fjeldstad |
| 22 | Shots | 37 | Referee: (Latvia) Sintija Čamane; Linesmen: (Canada) Melissa Brunn (Norway) Anette Fjeldstad |

| 9 January 2024; 12:30 | Denmark | 0–4 (0–2, 0–0, 0–2) | Hungary | Sportarena Unterland, Egna; Attendance: 98 |

Game reference

Anja Poulsen
Goalies
Helga Milibák
Referee:
(Sweden) Sabina Küller
Linesmen:
(Iceland) Elva Hjálmarsdóttir
(United States) Abigail Torres

| 0–1 | 02:53 – Hiezl (Weiler) |
| 0–2 | 11:17 – Báhiczki-Tóth (Hiezl) (PP) |
| 0–3 | 54:41 – Weiler (Hiezl) (PP) |
| 0–4 | 59:27 – Báhiczki-Tóth (Hiezl) (PP2) |

41 min
Penalties
2 min
6
Shots
45

| 9 January 2024; 16:00 | Japan | 3–0 (2–0, 0–0, 1–0) | Austria | Sportarena Unterland, Egna; Attendance: 87 |

Game reference

Haruka Kuromaru
Goalies
Karla Kronberger
Referee:
(Switzerland) Reica Staiger
Linesmen:
(Canada) Melissa Brunn
(United States) Danika Korpacz

| Akimoto (Suzuki, Homma) – 08:47 | 1–0 |
| Odermatt (K. Sato, Kishibe) (PP) – 12:07 | 2–0 |
| Numabe (A. Tada) – 45:09 | 3–0 |

4 min
Penalties
14 min
27
Shots
15

| 9 January 2024; 19:30 | Italy | 3–1 (2–1, 1–0, 0–0) | France | Sportarena Unterland, Egna; Attendance: 187 |

Game reference

Margherita Ostoni
Goalies
Violette Pianel-Couriaut
Referee:
(Latvia) Sintija Čamane
Linesmen:
(Norway) Anette Fjeldstad
(United States) Kathryn Glover

| Fantin (PP) – 02:42 | 1–0 |
| | 1–1 | 04:27 – Boudin (Apertet, Origlio) |
| Heidenberger (Fantin, Lobis) (PP) – 10:04 | 2–1 |
| Fantin (De Bortoli, Heidenberger) – 39:24 | 3–1 |

8 min
Penalties
14 min
22
Shots
30

| 10 January 2024; 12:30 | Hungary | 2–1 OT (0–1, 1–0, 0–0) (OT: 1–0) | Austria | Sportarena Unterland, Egna; Attendance: 78 |

Game reference

Helga Milibák
Goalies
Rosina Fichtinger
Referee:
(Sweden) Sabina Küller
Linesmen:
(Norway) Anette Fjeldstad
(United States) Danika Korpacz

| | 0–1 | 17:55 – Hobitsch (Tekin) (PP) |
| Kárpáti (Mozolai) – 36:16 | 1–1 |
| Hiezl (Báhiczki-Tóth) – 61:01 | 2–1 |

4 min
Penalties
8 min
32
Shots
15

| 10 January 2024; 16:00 | Italy | 4–2 (0–0, 0–2, 4–0) | Denmark | Sportarena Unterland, Egna; Attendance: 142 |

Game reference

Margherita Ostoni
Goalies
Mila Petersen
Referee:
(United States) Sydney Harris
Linesmen:
(Iceland) Elva Hjálmarsdóttir
(Hungary) Bernadett Holzer

| | 0–1 | 20:58 – Ranum (Bergmann) (PP) |
| | 0–2 | 39:16 – Bergmann (Søndergaard, Lau) (PP2) |
| Weber (Giuliani) – 41:39 | 1–2 |
| Heidenberger (De Bortoli, Fantin) – 42:13 | 2–2 |
| Todesco (Fantin, Lobis) (PP) – 55:30 | 3–2 |
| Carioti (ENG) – 59:07 | 4–2 |

16 min
Penalties
8 min
37
Shots
13

| 10 January 2024; 19:30 | France | 2–6 (1–3, 1–1, 0–2) | Japan | Sportarena Unterland, Egna; Attendance: 69 |

Game reference

Liv Wegmuller
Goalies
Haruka Kuromaru
Referee:
(Latvia) Sintija Čamane
Linesmen:
(United States) Kathryn Glover
(United States) Abigail Torres

| | 0–1 | 04:16 – Numabe (Terauchi, A. Tada) |
| Verleene (Moussier) – 09:57 | 1–1 |
| | 1–2 | 11:58 – Gotoh (Kishibe) |
| | 1–3 | 16:47 – N. Okumura (Numabe, A. Tada) (PP) |
| Bontemps (Peyne-Dingival) (PP) – 25:38 | 2–3 |
| | 2–4 | 31:33 – K. Sato (Odaira, Homma) |
| | 2–5 | 52:44 – K. Sato (Odaira, A. Tada) |
| | 2–6 | 55:32 – Odaira |

10 min
Penalties
4 min
20
Shots
30

| 12 January 2024; 12:30 | Austria | 3–2 GWS (1–1, 0–1, 1–0) (OT: 0–0) (SO: 1–0) | Denmark | Sportarena Unterland, Egna; Attendance: 88 |

Game reference

Rosina Fichtinger
Goalies
Mila Petersen
Referee:
(United States) Sydney Harris
Linesmen:
(Canada) Melissa Brunn
(United States) Karhryn Glover

| Nagy (Lintner, Henek) – 04:16 | 1–0 |
| | 1–1 | 05:40 – Ranum (Bergmann) |
| | 1–2 | 36:43 – Bergmann (Holm) (PP2) |
| Tekin (EA) – 59:05 | 2–2 |

Nagy (miss)
Prosen (miss)
Picka
Lintner (miss)
Hobitsch (miss)
Shootout
(miss) Bergmann
(miss) Lau
(miss) Ranum
(miss) Dahlmann
(miss) Holm
12 min
Penalties
14 min
43
Shots
12

| 12 January 2024; 16:00 | France | 1–2 (0–0, 0–0, 1–2) | Hungary | Sportarena Unterland, Egna; Attendance: 71 |

Game reference

Violette Pianel-Couriaut
Goalies
Helga Milibák
Referee:
(Switzerland) Reica Staiger
Linesmen:
(Iceland) Elva Hjálmarsdóttir
(United States) Danika Korpacz

| Origlio (Peyne-Dingival) (PP) – 42:46 | 1–0 |
| | 1–1 | 45:30 – Gergely (Hiezl) (SH) |
| | 1–2 | 53:16 – Polónyi (Weiler) (PP) |

6 min
Penalties
10 min
14
Shots
37

| 12 January 2024; 19:30 | Japan | 6–1 (4–0, 0–1, 2–0) | Italy | Sportarena Unterland, Egna; Attendance: 689 |

Game reference

Haruka Kuromaru
Goalies
Margherita Ostoni
Referee:
(Sweden) Sabina Küller
Linesmen:
(Hungary) Bernadett Holzer
(United States) Abigail Torres

| Odaira (Numabe, Terauchi) (PP) – 05:06 | 1–0 |
| N. Okumura – 06:07 | 2–0 |
| Odaira (Numabe) – 15:36 | 3–0 |
| Tada (Odaira) (PP) – 17:36 | 4–0 |
| | 4–1 | 37:41 – Cambruzzi (Fantin) |
| Odaira (Numabe) (PP) – 43:42 | 5–1 |
| Terauchi (Odaira) (PP) – 53:03 | 6–1 |

4 min
Penalties
12 min
27
Shots
21

=== Statistics ===
==== Scoring leaders ====
| Pos | Player | Country | GP | G | A | Pts | +/− | PIM |
|---|---|---|---|---|---|---|---|---|
| 1 | Matilde Fantin | Italy | 5 | 7 | 4 | 11 | +7 | 12 |
| 2 | Umeka Odaira | Japan | 5 | 4 | 5 | 9 | +3 | 0 |
| 3 | Manuela Heidenberger | Italy | 5 | 4 | 3 | 7 | +7 | 6 |
| 4 | Azumi Numabe | Japan | 5 | 2 | 5 | 7 | +4 | 2 |
| 5 | Kohane Sato | Japan | 5 | 3 | 3 | 6 | +5 | 6 |
| 6 | Réka Hiezl | Hungary | 5 | 2 | 4 | 6 | +2 | 0 |
| 6 | Ai Tada | Japan | 5 | 2 | 4 | 6 | +3 | 6 |
| 8 | Nikita Bergmann | Denmark | 5 | 2 | 3 | 5 | –2 | 18 |
| 9 | Olivia Ranum | Denmark | 5 | 3 | 1 | 4 | –2 | 27 |
| 10 | Marleen Origlio | France | 5 | 2 | 2 | 4 | –1 | 2 |
| 10 | Artemis Tekin | Austria | 5 | 2 | 2 | 4 | 0 | 6 |

GP = Games played; G = Goals; A = Assists; Pts = Points; +/− = Plus–minus; PIM = Penalties In Minutes
Source: IIHF

==== Goaltending leaders ====
(minimum 40% team's total ice time)

| Pos | Player | Country | TOI | GA | GAA | SA | Sv% | SO |
|---|---|---|---|---|---|---|---|---|
| 1 | Haruka Kuromaru | Japan | 300:00 | 4 | 0.80 | 105 | 96.19 | 2 |
| 2 | Helga Milibák | Hungary | 181:01 | 2 | 0.66 | 35 | 94.29 | 1 |
| 3 | Mila Petersen | Denmark | 123:58 | 5 | 2.42 | 78 | 93.59 | 0 |
| 4 | Violette Pianel-Couriaut | France | 239:00 | 8 | 2.01 | 94 | 91.49 | 0 |
| 5 | Anja Poulsen | Denmark | 179:19 | 11 | 3.68 | 124 | 91.13 | 0 |

TOI = Time on ice (minutes:seconds); GA = Goals against; GAA = Goals against average; SA = Shots against; Sv% = Save percentage; SO = Shutouts
Source: IIHF

=== Awards ===
- Best players selected by the directorate:
  - Best Goaltender: (Japan) Haruka Kuromaru
  - Best Defender: (Japan) Kohane Sato
  - Best Forward: (Italy) Matilde Fantin

Source: IIHF

== Group B tournament ==
2024 IIHF World Women's U18 Championship Division I B

Tournament details
- Host country: Spain
- City: Jaca
- Venue: 1 (in 1 host city)
- Dates: 8–14 January 2024
- Teams: 6

Tournament statistics
- Games played: 15
- Goals scored: 112 (7.47 per game)
- Attendance: 3,394 (226 per game)
- Scoring leader: (Spain) Claudia Castellanos (14 points)

Official website
- www.iihf.com

The Division I Group B tournament was played in Jaca, Spain, from 8 to 14 January 2024.

=== Participating teams ===
| Team | Qualification |
|---|---|
| Norway | 6th place in 2023 World Championship Division I A and were relegated |
| Poland | 2nd place in 2023 World Championship Division I B |
| Spain | Hosts; 3rd place in 2023 World Championship Division I B |
| South Korea | 4th place in 2023 World Championship Division I B |
| Chinese Taipei | 5th place in 2023 World Championship Division I B |
| Australia | 1st place in 2023 World Championship Division II A and were promoted |

=== Standings ===
| Pos | Team | Pld | W | OTW | OTL | L | GF | GA | GD | Pts | Promotion or relegation |
|---|---|---|---|---|---|---|---|---|---|---|---|
| 1 | Norway | 5 | 5 | 0 | 0 | 0 | 37 | 4 | +33 | 15 | Promoted to the 2025 Division I A |
| 2 | Spain (H) | 5 | 4 | 0 | 0 | 1 | 33 | 4 | +29 | 12 | |
| 3 | Poland | 5 | 3 | 0 | 0 | 2 | 21 | 13 | +8 | 9 | |
| 4 | Australia | 5 | 1 | 0 | 0 | 4 | 5 | 32 | −27 | 3 (Note: In head-to-head games Australia 3 pts and +2 GD, South Korea 3 pts and +2 GD, Chinese Taipei 3 pts and –4 GD, Australia defeated South Korea 3–0.) | |
| 5 | South Korea | 5 | 1 | 0 | 0 | 4 | 10 | 17 | −7 | 3 | |
| 6 | Chinese Taipei | 5 | 1 | 0 | 0 | 4 | 6 | 42 | −36 | 3 | Relegated to the 2025 Division II A |

Source: IIHF
Rules for classification: 1) points; 2) head-to-head points; 3) head-to-head goal difference; 4) head-to-head number of goals scored; 5) result against closest best-ranked team outside tied teams; 6) result against second-best ranked team outside tied teams; 7) seeding before tournament.
(H) Host

=== Schedule ===
All times are local (Central European Time – UTC+1).

| 8 January 2024; 13:00 | South Korea | 2–4 (0–2, 0–1, 2–1) | Poland | Pabellón de Hielo, Jaca |

Game reference

| 8 January 2024; 16:30 | Australia | 0–15 (0–5, 0–3, 0–7) | Norway | Pabellón de Hielo, Jaca |

Game reference

| 8 January 2024; 20:00 | Chinese Taipei | 0–15 (0–3, 0–6, 0–6) | Spain | Pabellón de Hielo, Jaca |

Game reference

| 9 January 2024; 13:00 | Norway | 6–1 (1–0, 4–1, 1–0) | South Korea | Pabellón de Hielo, Jaca |

Game reference

| 9 January 2024; 16:30 | Poland | 9–2 (3–1, 2–0, 4–1) | Chinese Taipei | Pabellón de Hielo, Jaca |

Game reference

| 9 January 2024; 20:00 | Spain | 9–0 (1–0, 4–0, 4–0) | Australia | Pabellón de Hielo, Jaca |

Game reference

| 11 January 2024; 13:00 | Norway | 10–0 (2–0, 4–0, 4–0) | Chinese Taipei | Pabellón de Hielo, Jaca |

Game reference

| 11 January 2024; 16:30 | Australia | 3–0 (0–0, 2–0, 1–0) | South Korea | Pabellón de Hielo, Jaca |

Game reference

| 11 January 2024; 20:00 | Poland | 1–5 (0–0, 0–4, 1–1) | Spain | Pabellón de Hielo, Jaca |

Game reference

| 13 January 2024; 13:00 | Poland | 5–0 (2–0, 2–0, 1–0) | Australia | Pabellón de Hielo, Jaca |

Game reference

| 13 January 2024; 16:30 | South Korea | 6–1 (1–0, 2–1, 3–0) | Chinese Taipei | Pabellón de Hielo, Jaca |

Game reference

| 13 January 2024; 20:00 | Spain | 1–2 (1–0, 0–1, 0–2) | Norway | Pabellón de Hielo, Jaca |

Game reference

| 14 January 2024; 13:00 | Chinese Taipei | 3–2 (0–2, 1–0, 2–0) | Australia | Pabellón de Hielo, Jaca |

Game reference

| 14 January 2024; 16:30 | Norway | 4–2 (2–1, 2–0, 0–1) | Poland | Pabellón de Hielo, Jaca |

Game reference

| 14 January 2024; 20:00 | Spain | 3–1 (0–1, 3–0, 0–0) | South Korea | Pabellón de Hielo, Jaca |

Game reference

=== Awards and statistics ===
==== Scoring leaders ====
List shows the top skaters sorted by points, then goals.

| Rank | Player | GP | G | A | Pts | +/− | PIM | POS |
|---|---|---|---|---|---|---|---|---|
| 1 | (Spain) Claudia Castellanos | 5 | 11 | 3 | 14 | +16 | 4 | F |
| 2 | (Norway) Tilde Simensen | 5 | 10 | 3 | 13 | +16 | 6 | F |
| 3 | (Poland) Magdalena Łąpieś | 5 | 6 | 4 | 10 | +6 | 4 | F |
| 4 | (Norway) Kajsa Bråten | 5 | 6 | 3 | 9 | +8 | 0 | F |
| 5 | (Spain) Nerea Giménez | 5 | 3 | 6 | 9 | +12 | 0 | F |
| 6 | (Poland) Matylda Stępień | 5 | 6 | 2 | 8 | +7 | 0 | F |
| 7 | (Norway) Edle Rise Moe | 5 | 4 | 4 | 8 | +16 | 4 | F |
| 8 | (Spain) Paula Giménez | 5 | 3 | 4 | 7 | +13 | 4 | F |
| 9 | (Norway) Tiril Arntzen | 5 | 2 | 5 | 7 | +15 | 2 | F |
| 10 | (Poland) Lena Zięba | 5 | 5 | 1 | 6 | +6 | 0 | F |

GP = Games played; G = Goals; A = Assists; Pts = Points; +/− = Plus/minus; PIM = Penalties in minutes; POS = Position
Source: IIHF

==== Leading goaltenders ====
Only the top five goaltenders, based on save percentage, who have played at least 40% of their team's minutes, are included in this list.

| Rank | Player | TOI | GA | GAA | SA | Sv% | SO |
|---|---|---|---|---|---|---|---|
| 1 | (Spain) Maria Sierra | 280:00 | 4 | 0.86 | 101 | 96.04 | 1 |
| 2 | (Norway) Mia Lind | 220:00 | 4 | 1.09 | 59 | 93.22 | 0 |
| 3 | (South Korea) Cheon Hyo-seo | 299:29 | 17 | 3.41 | 174 | 90.23 | 0 |
| 4 | (Chinese Taipei) Chiu Yi-ting | 226:36 | 26 | 6.88 | 245 | 89.39 | 0 |
| 5 | (Poland) Alicja Kobiela | 280:00 | 12 | 2.57 | 93 | 87.10 | 1 |

TOI = Time on ice (minutes:seconds); SA = Shots against; GA = Goals against; GAA = Goals against average; Sv% = Save percentage; SO = Shutouts
Source: IIHF

==== Awards ====
- Best players selected by the directorate:
  - Best Goaltender: (Spain) Maria Sierra
  - Best Defender: (Norway) Thea Fernande Rustbakken
  - Best Forward: (Norway) Tilde Simensen

Source: IIHF.com
