= Fantin =

Fantin is a surname. Notable people with the surname include:

- Antonio Fantin (born 2001), Italian swimmer
- Henri Fantin-Latour (1836–1904), French painter and lithographer
  - 10311 Fantin-Latour (1990 QL9), Main-belt Asteroid discovered on August 16, 1990
- Matilde Fantin (born 2007) Played for the Italian women's national ice hockey team in the women's ice hockey tournament at the 2026 Winter Olympics
- Pietro Fantin (born 1991), Brazilian racing driver
- Priscila Fantin (born 1983), Brazilian actress
