= Sehana Galbrun =

French ice hockey player (born 2005)

- Born: 14 September 2005 (age 21) Saint-Martin-d'Hères, Isère, France
- Height: 1.69 m (5 ft 7 in)
- Weight: 60 kg (132 lb; 9 st 6 lb)
- Position: Forward
- Shoots: Left
- Auroraliiga team: IFK Helsinki
- National team: France
- Playing career: 2018–present

Sehana Galbrun (born 14 September 2005) is a French ice hockey player who plays as a forward for IFK Helsinki in the Auroraliiga.

Galbrun represented France at the women's ice hockey tournament at the 2026 Winter Olympics.

== Playing career ==
Galbrun developed through France's national team pathway and was selected to represent France at the under-16 and under-18 levels. She later moved to Finland and joined IFK Helsinki. In December 2024, the French Ice Hockey Federation noted her strong start to her first Auroraliiga season, reporting six points (two goals, four assists) early in the campaign.

== International play ==
At junior level, Galbrun won a Division I silver medal with France at the 2022 IIHF U18 Women's World Championship Division I Group A and a Division I bronze medal at the 2023 tournament.

At senior level, she played for France at the 2025 IIHF Women's World Championship Division I Group A, appearing in five games.

In January 2026, Galbrun was selected to represent France at the Milan–Cortina Olympic Games. She appeared in four games at the Olympics.

== Personal life ==
Galbrun studies mathematics and computer science through a distance-learning degree programme.

== Career statistics ==
=== International ===
| Year | Team | Event | Result | GP | G | A | Pts | PIM |
|---|---|---|---|---|---|---|---|---|
| 2022 | France | U18 (D1A) | 2nd | 4 | 0 | 0 | 0 | 0 |
| 2023 | France | U18 (D1A) | 3rd | 5 | 0 | 2 | 2 | 2 |
| 2025 | France | WC (D1A) | 4th | 5 | 0 | 0 | 0 | 0 |
| 2026 | France | OG | 10th | 4 | 0 | 0 | 0 | 0 |
