= Margherita Ostoni =

Italian ice hockey player (born 2006)

- Born: 1 July 2006 (age 20) Milan, Italy
- Height: 1.68 m (5 ft 6 in)
- Weight: 64 kg (141 lb; 10 st 1 lb)
- Position: Goaltender
- Catches: Left
- team Former teams: IF Bjorkloven; Piemont Rebelles
- National team: Italy
- Playing career: 2020–present

Margherita Ostoni (born 1 July 2006) is an Italian ice hockey goaltender. She is a member of the Italian women's national ice hockey team, she participated in women's ice hockey tournament at the 2026 Winter Olympics.

== Playing career ==
=== International ===
Ostoni was a member of the Italian roster that captured the gold medal at the 2025 IIHF Women's World Championship Division I, Group B event in Dumfries, Great Britain. Italy went 5–0 to earn a promotion to Group A.

In the tournament's final game, which saw Italy defeat host nation Great Britain by a 4–0 mark, Ostoni has 12 saves.

At the 2026 Winter Olympics, Ostoni was the third goaltender for Italy, behind Martina Fedel and Gabriella Durante.
