= Italy women's national ice hockey team =

Italy
- Nickname: Le Azzurre (The Blues)
- Association: Italian Ice Sports Federation
- Head coach: Alexandre Tremblay
- Assistants: Stefano Daprà; Éric Houde
- Captain: Nadia Mattivi
- Most games: Linda De Rocco (91)
- Top scorer: Federica Zandegiacomo (32)
- Most points: Eleonora Dalprà (59)
- Team colors
- IIHF code: ITA
Home colours	Away colours

Ranking
- Current IIHF: 15 (▲2) (3 June 2026)
- Highest IIHF: 11 (2006)
- Lowest IIHF: 20 (first in 2014)

First international
- Czech Republic 6–0 Italy (Feltre, Italy; 27 February 1993)

Biggest win
- Italy 41–0 Bulgaria (Liepāja, Latvia; 2 September 2008)

Biggest defeat
- Canada 16–0 Italy (Turin, Italy; 11 February 2006)

Olympics
- Appearances: 2 (first in 2006)

World Championship
- Appearances: 23 (first in 2000)
- Best result: 13th (2026)

International record (W–L–T)
- 118–122–3

The Italian women's national ice hockey team (Italian: Nazionale femminile di hockey su ghiaccio dell'Italia) represents Italy at the Winter Olympic Games, the International Ice Hockey Federation (IIHF) Women's World Championship, and other international ice hockey competitions. Nicknamed le Azzurre (lit. 'the Blues') on account of their blue uniform, the team is controlled by the Federazione Italiana Sport del Ghiaccio (FISG).

Women's participation in Italian ice hockey has remained relatively low but consistent in recent decades: Italy had 490 female players registered with the IIHF in 2011, and 487 female players in 2025.

== Tournament record ==
=== Olympic Games ===
- 2006 – Finished in 8th place
- 2026 – Finished in 8th place

=== World Championship ===
- 1999 – Finished in 17th place (1st in Pool B)
- 2000 – Finished in 16th place (8th in Pool B)
- 2001 – Finished in 19th place (2nd in Division II/A)
- 2003 – Finished in 18th place (4th in Division II)
- 2004 – Finished in 17th place (2nd in Division II)
- 2005 – Finished in 16th place (2nd in Division II)
- 2007 – Finished in 17th place (2nd in Division II)
- 2008 – Finished in 19th place (4th in Division II)
- 2009 – Finished in 19th place (4th in Division II)
- 2011 – Finished in 17th place (4th in Division II)
- 2012 – Finished in 20th place (6th in Division IB)
- 2013 – Finished in 22nd place (2nd in Division IIA)
- 2014 – Finished in 21st place (1st in Division IIA)
- 2015 – Finished in 19th place (5th in Division IB)
- 2016 – Finished in 18th place (4th in Division IB)
- 2017 – Finished in 19th place (5th in Division IB)
- 2018 – Finished in 16th place (1st in Division IB, promoted to Division IA)
- 2019 – Finished in 16th place (6th in Division IA, relegated to Division IB)
- 2020 – Cancelled due to the COVID-19 pandemic
- 2021 – Cancelled due to the COVID-19 pandemic
- 2022 – Finished in 18th place (3rd in Division IB)
- 2023 – Finished in 19th place (3rd in Division IB)
- 2024 – Finished in 19th place (3rd in Division IB)
- 2025 – Finished in 17th place (1st in Division IB, promoted to Division IA)
- 2026 – Finished in 13th place (3rd in Division IA)

== Team ==
=== 2026 Olympics roster ===
The roster was named on 20 January 2026.

Head coach: (Canada) Eric Bouchard

No.	Pos.	Name	Height	Weight	Birthdate	Team
1	G	Gabriella Durante	1.81 m (5 ft 11 in)	69 kg (152 lb)	20 January 2001 (aged 25)	(Italy) Real Torino
2	D	Amie Varano	1.65 m (5 ft 5 in)	65 kg (143 lb)	18 June 1994 (aged 31)	(Sweden) Malmö Redhawks
3	D	Manuela Heidenberger	1.71 m (5 ft 7 in)	66 kg (146 lb)	15 September 2007 (aged 18)	(Finland) HPK Hämeenlinna
4	F	Carola Saletta	1.74 m (5 ft 9 in)	66 kg (146 lb)	11 February 1993 (aged 32)	(Switzerland) HC Fribourg-Gottéron
8	F	Anna Caumo	1.67 m (5 ft 6 in)	67 kg (148 lb)	16 February 2002 (aged 23)	(Italy) HC Pustertal Wölfe
10	F	Aurora Abatangelo	1.65 m (5 ft 5 in)	69 kg (152 lb)	14 December 2002 (aged 23)	(Switzerland) HC Davos
11	F	Justine Reyes	1.73 m (5 ft 8 in)	72 kg (159 lb)	14 February 1997 (aged 28)	(Sweden) Modo Hockey
12	F	Rebecca Roccella	1.62 m (5 ft 4 in)	60 kg (130 lb)	3 April 2001 (aged 24)	(Switzerland) HC Davos
13	D	Laura Lobis	1.68 m (5 ft 6 in)	72 kg (159 lb)	25 March 2006 (aged 19)	(Italy) SV Kaltern
14	F	Eleonora Bonafini	1.74 m (5 ft 9 in)	74 kg (163 lb)	17 February 1995 (aged 30)	(Italy) Bolzano Eagles
15	D	Greta Niccolai	1.62 m (5 ft 4 in)	60 kg (130 lb)	10 May 2001 (aged 24)	(Switzerland) HC Davos
17	F	Matilde Fantin	1.74 m (5 ft 9 in)	74 kg (163 lb)	1 January 2007 (aged 19)	(United States) Penn State Nittany Lions
18	D	Franziska Stocker	1.72 m (5 ft 8 in)	75 kg (165 lb)	16 December 1997 (aged 28)	(Sweden) Södertälje SK
19	F	Kristin Della Rovere	1.76 m (5 ft 9 in)	74 kg (163 lb)	30 November 2000 (aged 25)	(Canada) Toronto Sceptres
21	F	Marta Mazzocchi	1.60 m (5 ft 3 in)	61 kg (134 lb)	23 August 2004 (aged 21)	(Italy) Bolzano Eagles
22	F	Sara Kaneppele	1.74 m (5 ft 9 in)	74 kg (163 lb)	30 June 2003 (aged 22)	(Italy) Bolzano Eagles
25	G	Martina Fedel	1.65 m (5 ft 5 in)	62 kg (137 lb)	20 December 2002 (aged 23)	(Canada) University of Guelph
27	D	Kristen Guerriero	1.72 m (5 ft 8 in)	77 kg (170 lb)	27 May 1999 (aged 26)	(Italy) Bolzano Eagles
55	D	Jacquie Pierri	1.63 m (5 ft 4 in)	65 kg (143 lb)	11 June 1990 (aged 35)	(Italy) Bolzano Eagles
66	G	Margherita Ostoni	1.68 m (5 ft 6 in)	68 kg (150 lb)	1 July 2006 (aged 19)	(Sweden) IF Björklöven
77	D	Laura Fortino – A	1.63 m (5 ft 4 in)	62 kg (137 lb)	30 January 1991 (aged 35)	(Italy) Real Torino
82	F	Kayla Tutino – A	1.65 m (5 ft 5 in)	62 kg (137 lb)	18 December 1992 (aged 33)	(Italy) Real Torino
93	D	Nadia Mattivi – C	1.77 m (5 ft 10 in)	78 kg (172 lb)	2 May 2000 (aged 25)	(Sweden) Luleå HF

=== Head coaches ===
- Markus Sparer, c. 1999–2005
- Herbert Frisch, 2006–2007
- Marco Liberatore, 2007–2019
- Massimo Fedrizzi, 2021–2023
- Stéphanie Poirier, 2024–
