= Justine Reyes =

American-Italian ice hockey player (born 1997)

- Born: February 17, 1997 (age 29) Chino Hills, California, United States
- Height: 1.73 m (5 ft 8 in)
- Weight: 72 kg (159 lb; 11 st 5 lb)
- Position: Forward
- SDHL team Former teams: HV71Hockey: St. Lawrence; ESC Planneg; Linköping HC; Connecticut Whale; EV Bozen Eagles
- National team: Italy
- Playing career: 2013–present

Justine Reyes (born February 14, 1997) is an American-Italian ice hockey player. As a member of the Italian national team, she participated in the women's ice hockey tournament at the 2026 Winter Olympics.

== Playing career ==
=== College ===
Reyes played four seasons (2015–19) of college ice hockey with the St. Lawrence Skating Saints women's ice hockey program in the ECAC conference of the NCAA Division I. She appeared in 144 games, logging 52 goals and 55 assists for 107 points. She is joined on the 2026 Italian Olympic team by fellow St. Lawrence alum Kristen Guerriero.

=== International ===
In Italy's fourth game of Group B play, Reyes scored a goal in a 2-1 loss versus Germany.

In the quarterfinals of the 2026 Olympics, Italy played the United States, marking the first time they played each other in women's ice hockey at the Winter Olympics. Reyes registered one of Italy's six shots on net, logging 22:33 of ice time in a 6-0 loss.

== Awards and honours ==
- 2017-18 ECAC Hockey All-Academic Team
- 2019 St. Lawrence Bernie MacKinnon Team MVP Award
