= Sara Kaneppele =

Italian ice hockey player (born 2003)

- Born: June 30, 2003 (age 23) Merano, Italy
- Height: 1.75 m (5 ft 9 in)
- Weight: 70 kg (154 lb; 11 st 0 lb)
- Position: Forward
- Shoots: Left
- EWHL team Former teams: Bolzano Eagles; ERC Ingolstadt
- National team: Italy
- Playing career: 2017–present

Sara Kaneppele (born June 30, 2003) is an Italian ice hockey player. She is a member of the Italian women's national ice hockey team, she participated in women's ice hockey tournament at the 2026 Winter Olympics.

== Playing career ==
=== International ===
Making her Olympic debut on February 5, 2026, the game also marked France's first appearance in women's ice hockey at the Olympics. Wearing number 22, Kaneppele logged 8:03 minutes of ice time.
