= Gabriella Durante =

Italian-Canadian ice hockey player (born 2001)

- Born: January 20, 2001 (age 25) Calgary, Alberta, Canada
- Height: 1.81 m (5 ft 11 in)
- Weight: 69 kg (152 lb; 10 st 12 lb)
- Position: Goaltender
- IHLW team Former teams: Real Torino; Calgary Dinos
- National team: Italy

Gabriella Frances Durante (born January 20, 2001) is an Italian-Canadian ice hockey player. She is a member of the Italian women's national ice hockey team that participated in Ice hockey at the 2026 Winter Olympics – Women's tournament. Durante was selected sixty second overall by the Seattle Torrent in the 2026 PWHL Draft.

== Playing career ==
=== College ===
Durante played five seasons of college ice hockey with the Calgary Dinos women's ice hockey program in the Canada West conference of U SPORTS, appearing in 77 games. With the Dinos, Durante was a three-time Canadian All-Academic. Coincidentally, her first head coach with the Dinos was Carla MacLeod, who served as head coach for the Czech Republic women's national ice hockey team at the 2026 Winter Olympics.

=== International ===
Durante was named one of the goaltenders for Italy at the 2026 Winter Olympics. Serving as the backup to Martina Fedel, Durante made her first Olympic appearance on February 7, 2026. After Sweden scored their fifth goal of the game, Durante entered the game at the 46:53 mark. She allowed a goal to Thea Johansson in a 6–1 loss.

In Italy's third game of the Olympics, Durante stopped 27 of 29 shots in a 3–2 win on February 9, 2026, versus Japan.

In the quarterfinals of the 2026 Olympics, Italy played the United States, marking the first time they played each other in women's ice hockey at the Winter Olympics. Durante faced 51 shots, recording 45 saves in a 6–0 shutout loss.

== Awards and honours ==
- U Sports Athlete of the Week (awarded November 29, 2023)
- U Sports Athlete of the Week (awarded February 21, 2024)
- Canada West 2nd Team All-Star (2022-23)
