= Jacquie Pierri =

American-Italian ice hockey player (born 1990)

- Born: June 11, 1990 (age 36) Montclair, New Jersey, U.S.
- Height: 1.63 m (5 ft 4 in)
- Weight: 65 kg (143 lb; 10 st 3 lb)
- Position: Defense
- Shoots: Right
- EWHL team Former teams: EV Bozen Eagles; SDE Hockey (SDHL); Calgary Inferno (CWHL); Brown Bears (ECAC)
- National team: Italy
- Playing career: 2008–present

Jacqueline Malca Pierri (born June 11, 1990) is an American-Italian ice hockey player. She is also a member of the Italian women's national ice hockey team that participated at the 2026 Winter Olympics.

Raised in Montclair, New Jersey, Pierri played prep hockey at Montclair High School, where she graduated in 2008. She played on the varsity boys' ice hockey team during all four years and was team captain as a senior.

== Playing career ==
=== College ===
Pierri played four seasons of college ice hockey with the Brown Bears women's ice hockey program in the Hockey East (HEA) conference of the NCAA Division I. While at Brown, Pierri studied mechanical engineering, with a concentration on energy conversion.

=== Professional ===
Pierri played for the Calgary Inferno of the Canadian Women's Hockey League. She made her debut on November 9, 2013 versus the Toronto Furies.

Pierri appeared in the 2016 and 2017 Clarkson Cup Finals, winning in 2016. In her final season (2017–18) with the Inferno, Pierri recorded her first CWHL goal, finishing the season with four goals. During the 2017–18, Pierri led all Inferno skaters in Plus/Minus with a ranking of+20.

=== International play ===
Pierri represented Italy at the 2026 Winter Olympics. In her Olympic debut, a 4-1 win versus France, she logged 10 minutes of ice time and 16 shifts.

In the quarterfinals of the 2026 Olympics, Italy played the United States, marking the first time they played each other in women's ice hockey at the Winter Olympics. Pierri registered one of Italy's six shots on net, logging 11:22 of ice time in a 6-0 loss.

== Personal life ==
Pierri relocated from North America to Sweden to earn a master's degree in sustainable energy systems. The thesis for her master's was "Practical Aspects of Ammonia Water as Secondary Refrigerants in Ice Rinks," studying a new version of liquid ammonia to cool rinks.

While in Calgary, Pierri worked to find efficiencies and more sustainable pathways in the natural gas industry.

During her years in Italy, Pierri has worked for a firm capturing heat from compost and another with a focus on ecologically sound construction.

Pierri is a climate activist, recognized as a member of Eco Athletes.

== Awards and honours ==
- Clarkson Cup champion (2016)
- New Jersey High School Ice Hockey Hall of Fame (inducted 2026)
