= Lucie Quarto =

French ice hockey player (born 2002)

- Born: 7 September 2002 (age 23) Besancon, France
- Height: 1.67 m (5 ft 6 in)
- Weight: 66 kg (146 lb; 10 st 6 lb)
- Position: Defense
- Shoots: Left
- IAHA team Former teams: Lindenwood Lady Lions; Carleton Ravens (U SPORTS)
- National team: France
- Playing career: 2016–present

Lucie Quarto (born 7 September 2002) is a French ice hockey player. She is a member of the France women's national ice hockey team that participated in women's ice hockey tournament at the 2026 Winter Olympics.

== Playing career ==
=== College ===
Quarto currently plays college ice hockey with the Lindenwood Lady Lions program in the Atlantic Hockey America (AHA) conference of the NCAA Division I. Worth noting, Lindenwood teammate Elina Zilliox also played for France at the 2026 Winter Olympics.

She recorded her first NCAA goal on 4 October 2025, versus Minnesota State. Before Lindenwood, she played at the university level in Canada with Ottawa's Carleton Ravens women's ice hockey during the 2021–22 season, competing in U SPORTS play.

=== International ===
Making her Olympic debut on 5 February 2026, also the first game for France in women's ice hockey at the Olympics, Quarto, wearing number 7, logged 17:04 of ice time.
