= Amie Varano =

Italian-American ice hockey player (born 1994)

- Born: June 18, 1994 (age 32) Duxbury, Massachusetts, United States
- Height: 1.68 m (5 ft 6 in)
- Weight: 66 kg (146 lb; 10 st 6 lb)
- Position: Defense
- Shoots: Right
- team Former teams: Malmo Redhawks; Sacred Heart Pioneers; EV Bozen Eagles
- National team: Italy
- Playing career: 2013–present

Amie Varano (born June 18, 1994) is an Italian-American ice hockey player. She is a member of the Italian women's national ice hockey team, she participated in women's ice hockey tournament at the 2026 Winter Olympics.

== Playing career ==
=== College ===
Varano played four seasons of college ice hockey with the Sacred Heart Pioneers women's ice hockey program in the New England Women's Hockey Alliance (NEWHA) conference of the NCAA Division I.

In her first three seasons (2013–16), Varano did not miss a game. She scored her first collegiate goal on November 8, 2013 versus the Holy Cross Crusaders.

During her senior season (2016–17), she served as captain, amassing 20 points as the Pioneers went 20-9-2.

Of note, Varano iis the first player in Pioneers program history to appear in women's ice hockey at the Winter Olympics.

=== International ===
Varano is of Italian descent through a grandfather, and holds dual Italian and American citizenship. She was a member of the Italian roster that captured the gold medal at the 2025 IIHF Women's World Championship Division I, Group B event in Dumfries, Great Britain. Varano scored four goals in the event as Italy earned promotion to Group A.

Making her Olympic debut on February 5, 2026 versus France, Varano logged 16:10 of ice time in a 4-1 win.

In the quarterfinals of the 2026 Olympics, Italy played the United States, marking the first time they played each other in women's ice hockey at the Winter Olympics. Varano logged 2:16 of ice time in a 6-0 loss.
