= Nadia Mattivi =

Italian ice hockey player (born 2000)

- Born: 2 May 2000 (age 26) Baselga di Piné, Trentino, Italy
- Height: 1.77 m (5 ft 10 in)
- Weight: 78 kg (172 lb; 12 st 4 lb)
- Position: Defense
- Shoots: Left
- PWHL team Former teams: Montréal Victoire: Luleå HF; Boston University Terriers; Linköping HC; EVB Eagles Südtirol
- National team: Italy
- Playing career: 2013–present

Nadia Mattivi (born 2 May 2000) is an Italian professional ice hockey player for the Montreal Victoire and captain of the Italian women's national ice hockey team.

== Playing career ==
Mattivi played five seasons of college ice hockey with the Boston University Terriers women's ice hockey program in the Hockey East (HEA) conference of the NCAA Division I. On 24 March 2026, she signed with Montréal Victoire of the PWHL for the remainder of the season. On 19 June 2026, she signed a three-year Standard Player Agreement with the Montreal Victoire.

=== International ===
At the 2022 IIHF Women's World Championship Division I, Group B tournament in Katowice, Poland, Mattivi won a bronze medal with Italy.

Mattivi was a member of the Italian roster that captured the gold medal at the 2025 IIHF Women's World Championship Division I, Group B event in Dumfries, Great Britain. Italy went 5–0 to earn a promotion to Group A.

In the tournament's final game, which saw Italy defeat host nation Great Britain by a 4–0 mark, Mattivi contributed an assist.

Mattivi was named team captain for Italy at the 2026 Winter Olympics. Making her Olympic debut on 5 February, Italy opposed France, who were making their Olympic debut. Mattivi earned the assist on Italy's first goal of the game, scored by Kayla Tutino, who also played at Boston University. Italy prevailed in a 4–1 final.

In Italy's third game of the Olympics, Mattivi logged an assist, also recording 28:42 of ice time in a 3–2 win on 9 February 2026, versus Japan.

== Career statistics ==
=== Regular season and playoffs ===
			Regular season					Playoffs
Season	Team	League	GP	G	A	Pts	PIM	GP	G	A	Pts	PIM
2019-20	Boston University	HE	33	5	8	13	20	—	—	—	—	—
2020-21	Boston University	HE	12	0	4	4	8	—	—	—	—	—
2021-22	Boston University	HE	29	3	9	12	28	—	—	—	—	—
2022-23	Boston University	HE	33	6	11	17	22	—	—	—	—	—
2023-24	Boston University	HE	34	3	14	17	20	—	—	—	—	—
2025–26	Montréal Victoire	PWHL	6	0	0	0	2	4	0	1	1	4
PWHL totals			6	0	0	0	2	4	0	1	1	4

== Awards and honours ==
- Hockey East All-Rookie Team (2020)
- Hockey East All-Academic selection (2020, 2021, 2022, 2023, 2024)
- Best Defender, 2022 IIHF Women's World Championship, Division I, Group B
- Walter Cup champion (2026)
