= Kristin Della Rovere =

Italian-Canadian ice hockey player

- Born: November 30, 2000 (age 25) Caledon, Ontario, Canada
- Height: 5 ft 9 in (175 cm)
- Weight: 163 lb (74 kg; 11 st 9 lb)
- Position: Centre
- Shoots: Right
- PWHL team Former teams: San Jose Sea Lions; PWHL Ottawa; EVB Eagles Südtirol; Toronto Sceptres
- National team: Italy
- Playing career: 2018–present

Kristin Della Rovere (born November 30, 2000) is an Italian-Canadian professional ice hockey centre for the San Jose Sea Lions of the Professional Women's Hockey League (PWHL). She is also a member of the Italy women's national ice hockey team. She previously played for PWHL Ottawa and Toronto Sceptres of the PWHL, as well as the EVB Eagles Südtirol of the European Women's Hockey League (EWHL) and Italian Hockey League Women (IHLW). She played college ice hockey at Harvard.

== Early life ==
Della Rovere and her childhood best friend, Zoe Boyd, grew up together in Caledon, Ontario. They played minor hockey together for the Caledon Hawks, Brampton Canadettes, and North Halton Twisters. Della Rovere and Boyd served as captain and alternate captains of the Caledon Hawks' boys hockey team.

== Playing career ==
=== College ===
Della Rovere began her collegiate career for Harvard during the 2018–19 season. During her freshman year, she ranked second on the team in scoring with 13 goals and 12 assists in 31 games. During the 2019–20 season, in her sophomore year, she led the team in scoring with 22 goals and 15 assists in 33 games. She also led the team with 168 shots on goal.

The Ivy League cancelled the 2020–21 season due to the COVID-19 pandemic. During the 2021–22 season, in her junior year, she recorded 15 goals and 25 assists in 32 games. She ranked first on the team with 403 face-off wins, second in points and assists and third in goals. Following the season she was named to the ECAC Hockey First-Team All-League and All-Ivy First Team. During the 2022–23 season, in her senior year, she recorded six goals and 14 assists in 31 games. She led the NCAA in face-off wins with 529.

=== Professional ===
On September 18, 2023, Della Rovere was drafted in the tenth round, 56th overall, by PWHL Ottawa in the 2023 PWHL Draft. On November 2, 2023, she signed a one-year contract with Ottawa. During the 2023–24 season she recorded one goal in nine games before suffering a season-ending wrist injury in March 2024.

On July 22, 2024, she signed with EVB Eagles Südtirol of the EWHL and IHLW in Italy. Her decision to sign with an Italian club was motivated by a desire to become a naturalized Italian citizen and represent Italy at the 2026 Winter Olympics. Following training camp, she signed a reserve player contract with the Toronto Sceptres prior to the 2025–26 season. On June 21, 2026, Della Rovere signed a one-year contract with the San Jose Sea Lions.

== International play ==
Della Rovere was a member of the Italian roster that captured the gold medal at the 2025 IIHF Women's World Championship Division I, Group B event in Dumfries, Great Britain. Italy went 5-0 to earn a promotion to Group A. In the tournament's final game, which saw Italy defeat host nation Great Britain by a 4-0 mark, Della Rovere contributed three assists.

On 20 January 2026, she was selected to represent Italy at the 2026 Winter Olympics. She made her Olympic debut on 5 February 2026, and scored a goal and an assist in a 4–1 victory over France. During Italy's third preliminary round game against Japan, she scored the game-winning goal in a 3–2 victory on 9 February 2026. During the quarterfinals, Italy faced the United States, marking the first time they played each other in women's ice hockey at the Winter Olympics. Italy lost the game 6–0 and were eliminated. Della Rovere led Italy in scoring during the tournament with two goals and two assists in five games.

== Personal life ==
Della Rovere's paternal grandparents, Alladino and Luigina (née Ciorri), were from southern Italy. Luigina was born in Colledara and she lived in the Della Rovere household during Della Rovere's childhood. Her mother of Macedonian origin is Elizabeth Dimovski-Della Rovere. Della Rovere obtained an Italian passport in 2025. Her brother, Andrew, plays NCAA Division III ice hockey at Utica University.

Della Rovere's cousin, Stefan, is a former professional ice hockey player.

== Career statistics ==
=== Regular season and playoffs ===
			Regular season					Playoffs
Season	Team	League	GP	G	A	Pts	PIM	GP	G	A	Pts	PIM
2018–19	Harvard University	ECAC	31	13	12	25	8	—	—	—	—	—
2019–20	Harvard University	ECAC	33	22	15	37	14	—	—	—	—	—
2021–22	Harvard University	ECAC	32	15	25	40	22	—	—	—	—	—
2022–23	Harvard University	ECAC	31	6	14	20	14	—	—	—	—	—
2023–24	PWHL Ottawa	PWHL	9	1	0	1	0	—	—	—	—	—
2024–25	EVB Eagles	EWHL	20	22	26	48	4	4	3	0	3	0
2024–25	EVB Eagles	IHLW	3	4	1	5	2	2	4	5	9	0
2025–26	Toronto Sceptres	PWHL	5	0	0	0	2	—	—	—	—	—
PWHL totals			14	1	0	1	2	—	—	—	—	—
EWHL totals			20	22	26	48	4	4	3	0	3	0

=== International ===
Year	Team	Event	Result	GP	G	A	Pts	PIM
2025	Italy	WC D1B	1st	5	2	5	7	6
2026	Italy	OG	8th	5	2	2	4	2
Senior totals				10	4	7	11	8
