= Carola Saletta =

Italian ice hockey player (born 1993)

- Born: 11 February 1993 (age 33) Moncalieri, Italy
- Height: 1.74 m (5 ft 9 in)
- Weight: 66 kg (146 lb; 10 st 6 lb)
- Position: Forward
- Shoots: Left
- PFWL team Former teams: HC Fribourg-Gottéron: Real Torino; EV Bozen Eagles; HC Torino Bulls; EV Bomo Thun
- National team: Italy
- Playing career: 2008–present

Carola Saletta (born 11 February 1993) is an Italian ice hockey player. She is a member of the Italian women's national ice hockey team and she participated in women's ice hockey tournament at the 2026 Winter Olympics.

== Playing career ==
=== International ===
Saletta made her Olympic debut on 5 February 2026 in a preliminary round match against France. Wearing number 4, Saletta logged 6:05 minutes of ice time.

== Personal life ==
Saletta is a Junior Professional Officer with the Legal Department of the World Health Organization.
