= Julia Mesplède =

French ice hockey player (born 2002)

- Born: 12 October 2002 (age 23) Pessac, France
- Height: 1.60 m (5 ft 3 in)
- Weight: 55 kg (121 lb; 8 st 9 lb)
- Position: Forward
- Shoots: Right
- HEA team: Vermont Catamounts
- National team: France
- Playing career: 2017–present

Julia Mesplède (born 12 October 2002) is a French ice hockey player. She is a member of the France women's national ice hockey team that participated in women's ice hockey tournament at the 2026 Winter Olympics.

== Playing career ==
=== College ===
Mesplède has played college ice hockey with the Vermont Catamounts women's ice hockey program in the Hockey East (HEA) conference of the NCAA Division I since 2022. She made her first appearance with Vermont in a match versus RPI on 30 September 2022. Her first collegiate goal was scored on 5 January 2025 versus Connecticut.

=== International ===
Making her Olympic debut on February 5, 2026, also the first game for France in women's ice hockey at the Olympics, Mesplède, wearing number 21, logged 10:49 of ice time.

== Awards and honours ==
- Hockey East All-Academic Team (2023–24, 2024–25)
