= Elina Zilliox =

French ice hockey player (born 2005)

- Born: 14 May 2005 (age 21) Schiltigheim, France
- Height: 1.67 m (5 ft 6 in)
- Weight: 69 kg (152 lb; 10 st 12 lb)
- Position: Defense
- Shoots: Left
- IAHA team Former teams: Lindenwood Lady Lions; Strasbourg CSGSA (France)
- National team: France
- Playing career: 2019–present

Elina Zilliox (born 14 May 2005) is a French ice hockey player. She is a member of the France women's national ice hockey team that participated in women's ice hockey tournament at the 2026 Winter Olympics.

She began her ice hockey career with Strasbourg CSGSA in France, where she played alongside boys until 2023. For the 2023–2024 season, she moved overseas to join the IROUNBOUND Elite program in the United States. In 2024, she began her collegiate ice hockey career at Lindenwood University, where she currently plays for the women's ice hockey team.

== Playing career ==
=== College ===
Zilliox began her collegiate ice hockey career in 2024 with the Lindenwood Lady Lions women's ice hockey program at Lindenwood University, competing in the Atlantic Hockey America (AHA) conference of NCAA Division I. She plays as a defenseman and wears jersey number 18.

During her freshman season (2024–25), Zilliox appeared in 27 games, recording two assists and 33 blocked shots. In her sophomore season (2025–26), she appeared in nine games, recording 15 shots on goal and finishing with a plus-minus rating of +5.

During the fall of 2025, Zilliox sustained a hand injury that required surgery, temporarily interrupting her collegiate season. She subsequently returned to competition and was selected to represent France at the 2026 Winter Olympics in Milan and Cortina d'Ampezzo, Italy.

Her Lindenwood teammate Lucie Quarto also represented France in the women's ice hockey tournament at the 2026 Winter Olympics.

=== International ===
Making her Olympic debut on February 5, 2026, also the first game for France in women's ice hockey at the Olympics, Zilliox, wearing number 91, logged 20:04 of ice time.
