= Eleonora Bonafini =

Italian ice hockey player (born 1995)

- Born: 17 February 1995 (age 31) Riva del Garda, Italy
- Height: 1.74 m (5 ft 9 in)
- Weight: 74 kg (163 lb; 11 st 9 lb)
- Position: Forward
- Shoots: Right
- team: Bolzano Eagles
- National team: Italy
- Playing career: 2010–present

Eleonora Bonafini (born 17 February 1995) is an Italian ice hockey player. She is a member of the Italian women's national ice hockey team, she participated in women's ice hockey tournament at the 2026 Winter Olympics.

== Playing career ==
=== International ===
Making her Olympic debut on 5 February 2026, the game also marked France's first appearance in women's ice hockey at the Olympics. Wearing number 14, Bonafini logged 4:06 minutes of ice time.
