= Greta Niccolai =

Italian ice hockey player (born 2001)

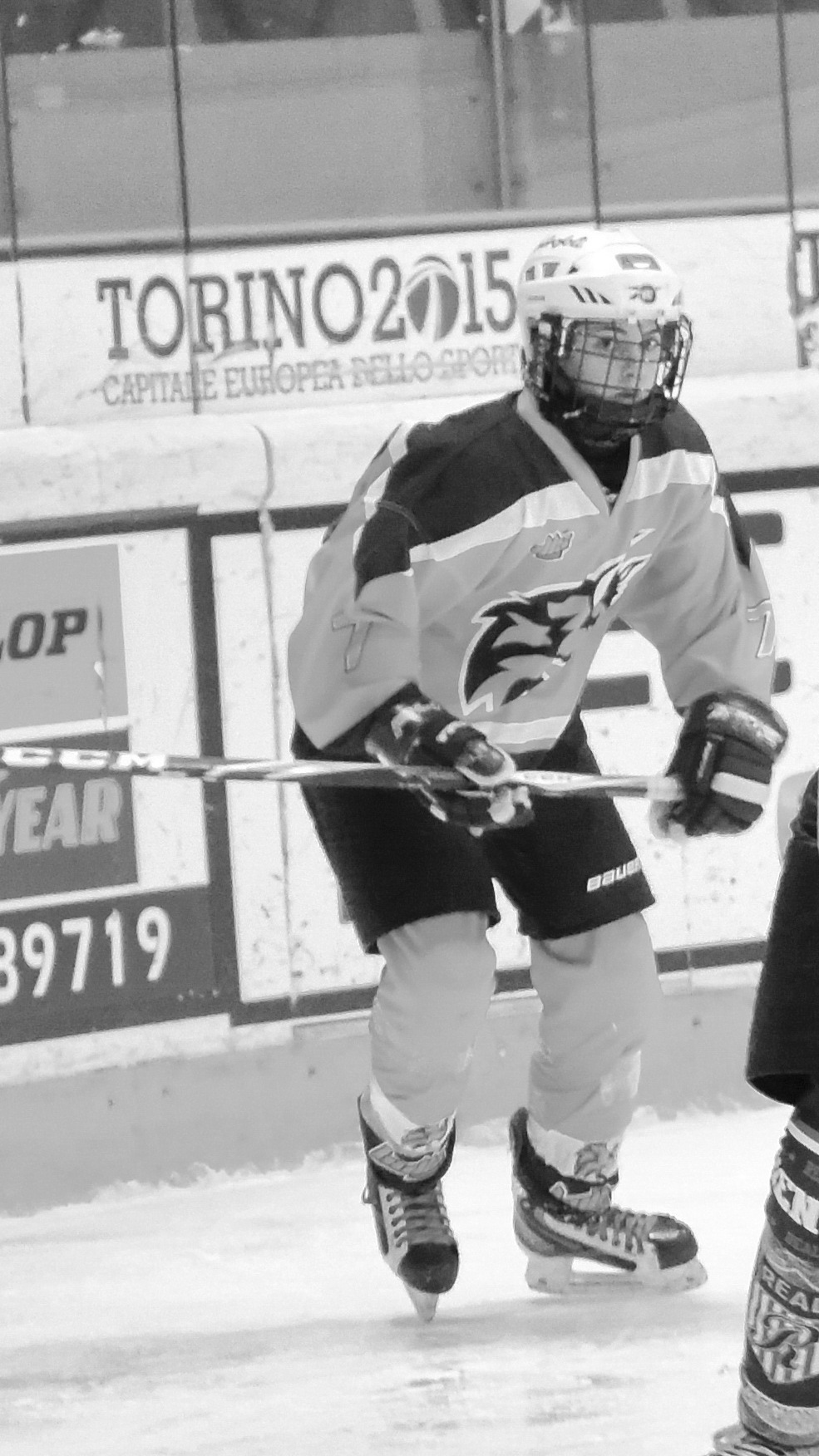
- Niccolai in 2015
- Born: 10 May 2001 (age 25) Milan, Italy
- Height: 1.62 m (5 ft 4 in)
- Weight: 54 kg (119 lb; 8 st 7 lb)
- Position: Forward
- Shoots: Right
- PFWL team Former teams: HC Ambri-Piotta Women; Lugano
- National team: Italy
- Playing career: 2014–present

Greta Niccolai (born 10 May 2001) is an Italian ice hockey player. She is a member of the Italian women's national ice hockey team, she participated in women's ice hockey tournament at the 2026 Winter Olympics.

== Playing career ==
=== International ===
In the quarterfinals of the 2026 Olympics, Italy played the United States, marking the first time they played each other in women's ice hockey at the Winter Olympics. Niccolai registered one of Italy's six shots on net, logging 12:17 of ice time in a 6-0 loss.
