= Kristen Guerriero =

Canadian-Italian ice hockey player (born 1999)

- Born: May 27, 1999 (age 27) Montreal, Quebec, Canada
- Height: 1.72 m (5 ft 8 in)
- Weight: 77 kg (170 lb; 12 st 2 lb)
- Position: Defense
- Shoots: Left
- EWHL/IHLW team Former teams: Bolzano Eagles: Neuchâtel HA; Budapest JA; St. Lawrence
- National team: Italy
- Playing career: 2014–present

Kristen Guerriero (born May 27, 1999) is a Canadian-Italian ice hockey player. She has been a member of the Italian national team since 2024 and participated in the women's ice hockey tournament at the 2026 Winter Olympics.

== Playing career ==
=== College ===
Guerriero played four seasons (2018–2022) of college ice hockey with the St. Lawrence Saints women's ice hockey program in the ECAC conference of the NCAA Division I. She appeared in 117 games, logging seven goals and 13 assists for 20 points. She is joined on the 2026 Italian Olympic team by fellow St. Lawrence alum Justine Reyes.

She scored her first goal with St. Lawrence on November 17, 2018, in a 4-1 win versus the Brown Bears. Coincidentally, Justine Reyes logged an assist in the win. She was subsequently named the ECAC Rookie of the Week.

== Awards and honours ==
- 2016 Canadian Under-18 Nationals, Silver Medal (Team Quebec)
- 2017-18 RSEQ All-Star
- 2022 ECAC Hockey All-Academic Team
