= Aurora Abatangelo =

Italian ice hockey player (born 2002)

- Born: 14 December 2002 (age 23) Desio, Italy
- Height: 1.65 m (5 ft 5 in)
- Weight: 69 kg (152 lb; 10 st 12 lb)
- Position: Forward
- team: HC Davos
- National team: Italy

Aurora Abatangelo (born 14 December 2002) is an Italian ice hockey player. She is a member of the Italian women's national ice hockey team, she participated in women's ice hockey tournament at the 2026 Winter Olympics.

== Playing career ==
=== International ===
Making her Olympic debut on 5 February 2026, the game also marked France's first appearance in women's ice hockey at the Olympics. Wearing number 10, Abatangelo logged 21:52 minutes of ice time.
