= Sophie Leclerc =

French ice hockey player (born 1997)

- Born: 14 August 1997 (age 29) Besancon, France
- Height: 1.64 m (5 ft 5 in)
- Weight: 64 kg (141 lb; 10 st 1 lb)
- Position: Forward
- team: Brûleurs de Loups
- National team: France
- Playing career: 2011–present

Sophie Leclerc (born 14 August 1997) is a French ice hockey player. She is a member of the France women's national ice hockey team that participated in women's ice hockey tournament at the 2026 Winter Olympics.

== Playing career ==
=== International ===
Making her Olympic debut on 5 February 2026, also the first game for France in women's ice hockey at the Olympics, Leclerc, wearing number 10, logged 15:26 of ice time.
