= Gabrielle De Serres =

Canadian-French ice hockey player (born 1998)

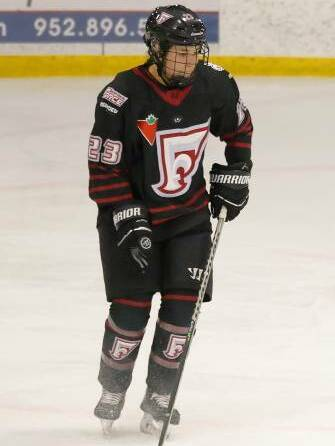
- De Serres with the Force de Montréal in 2022
- Born: January 29, 1998 (age 28) Montreal, Quebec, Canada
- Height: 1.73 m (5 ft 8 in)
- Weight: 73 kg (161 lb; 11 st 7 lb)
- Position: Defense
- Shoots: Right
- FFHG FÉ team Former teams: Cergy Pontoise; Toronto Lady Blues (OUA); Force de Montréal(PHF)
- National team: France

Gabrielle De Serres (born January 29, 1998) is a Canadian-French ice hockey player. She is a member of the France women's national ice hockey team that participated in Ice hockey at the 2026 Winter Olympics – Women's tournament.

== Playing career ==
=== College ===
De Serres played four seasons of college ice hockey with the Toronto Lady Blues women's ice hockey program in the Ontario University Athletics (OUA) conference of the U SPORTS. In her first season (2017–18), she ranked first among OUA rookie blueliners with 10 assists. In addition, she left all rookie blueliners in U SPORTS with 12 points. From 2017-20, her sister Mathilde De Serres also played for the Lady Blues.

=== International ===
De Serres was selected to play for Team Canada in women's ice hockey at the 2021 Winter Universiade in Lucerne, Switzerland. The event was cancelled due to concerns over the global pandemic.

Making her Olympic debut on February 5, 2026, the game also marked France's first appearance in women's ice hockey at the Olympics. De Serres scored France's first ever Olympic goal in a 4-1 loss

== Awards and honours ==
- 2017-18 OUA All-Rookie Team
- 2017-18 U SPORTS All-Rookie Team
- 2019-20 OUA Second Team All-Star
- 2021-22 OUA East Division First Team All-Star
- 2021-22 OUA East Division Most Valuable Player
