= Marta Mazzocchi =

Italian ice hockey player (born 2004)

- Born: 23 August 2004 (age 22) Aosta, Italy
- Height: 1.60 m (5 ft 3 in)
- Weight: 61 kg (134 lb; 9 st 8 lb)
- Position: Forward
- Shoots: Left
- EWHL team Former teams: Bolzano Eagles; Torino Bulls; Trinity College
- National team: Italy
- Playing career: 2017–present

Marta Mazzocchi (born 23 August 2004) is an Italian ice hockey player. She is a member of the Italian women's national ice hockey team, she participated in women's ice hockey tournament at the 2026 Winter Olympics.

== Playing career ==
=== International ===
Making her Olympic debut on 5 February 2026, the game also marked France's first appearance in women's ice hockey at the Olympics. Wearing number 21, Kaneppele logged 11:39 minutes of ice time.
