= Alice Philbert =

Canadian-French ice hockey player (born 1996)

- Born: November 10, 1996 (age 30) Saint-Bruno-de-Montarville, Quebec, Canada
- Height: 1.67 m (5 ft 6 in)
- Weight: 54 kg (119 lb; 8 st 7 lb)
- Position: Goaltender
- Catches: Left
- PWHL team Former teams: Detroit Clutch; EV Bozen Eagles
- National team: France
- Playing career: 2017–present

Alice Philbert (born November 10, 1996) is a Canadian-French professional ice hockey player for the Detroit Clutch of the Professional Women's Hockey League (PWHL). She is a member of the France women's national ice hockey team that competed at the 2026 Winter Olympics.

== Playing career ==
=== University ===
Philbert played five seasons of university ice hockey with the Concordia Stingers women's ice hockey program in the RSEQ conference of U SPORTS. She was a member of the Stingers roster that won the 2022 U Sports Women's Ice Hockey Championship. In the national championship final versus the Nipissing Lakers (OUA), Philbert recorded a shutout, making 25 saves in a 4-0 victory.

=== Professional ===
On June 22, 2026, she signed a two-year contract with the Detroit Clutch.

=== International ===
Born in Canada, Philbert naturalized in 2022 to play for the France women's national ice hockey team. She represented France at the 2026 Winter Olympics, and made her Olympic debut on February 5, 2026. The game also marked France's first appearance in women's ice hockey at the Olympics. Philbert faced 46 shots in a 4-1 loss In France's second game of the Olympics, a February 6, 2026 match versus Japan, Philbert faced 38 shots in a 3-2 loss. On February 9, 2026, Philbert gained the start versus Germany, facing 47 shots. The match went to overtime, as Germany prevailed in a 2-1 win. In Group B preliminary round play at the Olympics, Philbert played every minute for France.

== Awards and honours ==
- 2022 U SPORTS National Championship All-Star Team
