= Franziska Stocker =

Italian ice hockey player (born 1997)

- Born: 16 December 1997 (age 28) Bolzano, Italy
- Height: 1.72 m (5 ft 8 in)
- Weight: 75 kg (165 lb; 11 st 11 lb)
- Position: Defense
- Shoots: Right
- SDHL team Former teams: Södertälje; EV Bozen Eagles; Brynas IF; Lugano
- National team: Italy
Medal record
World Championship
Bronze medal – third place	2022 Div I, Group B, Poland

Franziska Stocker (born 16 December 1997) is an Italian ice hockey defender. She is a member of the Italian women's national ice hockey team that participated in the 2026 Winter Olympics.

== Playing career ==
=== International ===
Competing versus Sweden on 7 February 2026, Stocker scored Italy's only goal in a 6-1 loss.
