= Matilde Fantin =

Italian ice hockey player (born 2007)

- Born: 1 January 2007 (age 19) Como, Italy
- Height: 1.74 m (5 ft 9 in)
- Weight: 74 kg (163 lb; 11 st 9 lb)
- Position: Forward
- Shoots: Left
- NCAA team Former teams: Penn State; HC Ambrì-Piotta
- National team: Italy
- Playing career: 2022–present

Matilde Fantin (born 1 January 2007) is an Italian ice hockey player for Penn State. She is a member of the Italian women's national ice hockey team and participated in the women's ice hockey tournament at the 2026 Winter Olympics.

== Playing career ==
=== College ===
Fantin currently plays college ice hockey with the Penn State Nittany Lions women's ice hockey program in the Atlantic Hockey America (AHA) conference of the NCAA Division I.

Fantin was one of four Nittany Lions participating in women's ice hockey at the 2026 Winter Olympics, including Tessa Janecke, skating for the United States, plus Jessica Adolfsson and Nicole Hall, both members of Team Sweden.

=== International play ===
Fantin was a member of the Italian roster that captured the gold medal at the 2025 IIHF Women's World Championship Division I, Group B event in Dumfries, Great Britain. Italy went 5–0 to earn a promotion to Group A as Fantin was the tournament's leading scorer with 10 points.

Making her Olympic debut on 5 February, Italy opposed France, who were making their Olympic debut. Fantin scored Italy's third goal, prevailing in a 4–1 final.

She was one of 17 teenagers that played in women's ice hockey at the 2026 Winter Olympics.

In Italy's third game of the Olympics, Fantin scored twice in a 3–2 win on 9 February 2026, versus Japan.

In the quarterfinals of the 2026 Olympics, Italy played the United States, marking the first time they played each other in women's ice hockey at the Winter Olympics. Fantin registered one of Italy's six shots on net, logging 21:38 of ice time in a 6–0 loss.

== See also ==
- List of Pennsylvania State University Olympians
