= Manuela Heidenberger =

Italian ice hockey player (born 2007)

- Born: 15 September 2007 (age 19) Renon, Italy
- Height: 1.71 m (5 ft 7 in)
- Weight: 66 kg (146 lb; 10 st 6 lb)
- Position: Forward
- Shoots: Right
- HEA team Former teams: Holy Cross Crusaders: HPK Hämeenlinna; EV Bozen Eagles; HC Ladies Lugano
- National team: Italy
- Playing career: 2020–present

Manuela Heidenberger (born 15 September 2007) is an Italian ice hockey player and member of the Italian national team. She has played college ice hockey with the Holy Cross Crusaders women's ice hockey program since 2026.

Heidenberger participated in the women's ice hockey tournament at the 2026 Winter Olympics.

== Playing career ==
Heidenberger has played in the European Women's Hockey League (EWHL) and Italian Hockey League Women (IHLW) with EV Bozen Eagles, in the Swiss Women's League with HC Ladies Lugano, and in the Finnish Auroraliiga with HPK Hämeenlinna.

== International play ==
Heidenberger made her Olympic debut in a preliminary round match against France on 5 February 2026.

== Personal life ==
Heidenberger began attending the College of the Holy Cross in Worcester, Massachusetts, United States in autumn 2026.
