= Martina Fedel =

Swedish-Italian ice hockey player (born 2002)

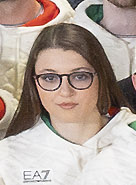
- Born: December 20, 2002 (age 23) Trento, Italy
- Height: 1.65 m (5 ft 5 in)
- Weight: 62 kg (137 lb; 9 st 11 lb)
- Position: Goaltender
- Catches: Left
- OUA team Former teams: Guelph Gryphons; SDE Hockey; HK Olimpija Ljubljana
- National team: Italy
- Playing career: 2015–present

Martina Fedel (born December 20, 2002) is a Swedish-Italian ice hockey goaltender for the Guelph Gryphons of Ontario University Athletics (OUA). She is a member of the Italian women's national ice hockey team and participated at the 2026 Winter Olympics.

== Playing career ==
=== College ===
Fedel joined the Guelph Gryphons women's ice hockey program in 2021, competing in the Ontario University Athletics (OUA) conference of U Sports.

== International play ==
Fedel was the starting goaltender for Italy at the Group B tournament of the 2022 IIHF Women's World Championship Division I in Katowice, Poland. Among the event highlights, she posted a 1–0 shutout versus Kazakhstan.

Fedel was named to the roster for Italy at the 2026 Winter Olympics. Making her Olympic debut on February 5, Fedel gained the start as Italy opposed France, who were making their Olympic debut. She made 14 saves as Italy prevailed in a 4–1 final.

== Personal life ==
Fedel has been a student at the University of Guelph in Guelph, Ontario, Canada since 2021. She is majoring in animal biology.

== Awards and honours ==
- OUA Athlete of the Week (Awarded November 14, 2023)
- 2024 Guelph Gryphons Female Athlete of the Year
- 2024 OUA First Team All-Star
- 2024 OUA Goaltender of the Year
- 2024 U Sports First Team All-Canadian
- 2025 OUA Second Team All-Star
