= Real Torino HC =

- City: Turin, Italy
- Founded: 2001
- Home arena: Palaghiaccio Tazzoli
- Colours: Blue, Red

Real Torino HC is an ice hockey team in Turin, Italy. They played in the Serie A2. The club was founded in 2001, and were promoted to the Serie A2 in 2008.
