= 2023 IIHF Women's World Championship Division I =

International ice hockey tournament

Tournament details
- Host countries: China; South Korea
- Venues: 2 (in 2 host cities)
- Dates: 20–26 August; 17–23 April
- Teams: 12

The 2023 IIHF Women's World Championship Division I consisted of two international ice hockey tournaments of the 2023 Women's Ice Hockey World Championships organized by the International Ice Hockey Federation (IIHF). Division I A and Division I B represent the second and third tier of the IIHF World Women's Championship.

China and Denmark gained promotion to the Top Division, while Slovakia were relegated from the Group A tournament. South Korea won the Group B tournament and got promoted, while Kazakhstan were relegated.

== Group A tournament ==
2023 IIHF Women's World Championship Division I A

Tournament details
- Host country: China
- City: Shenzhen
- Venue: 1 (in 1 host city)
- Dates: 20–26 August
- Teams: 6

Tournament statistics
- Games played: 15
- Goals scored: 64 (4.27 per game)
- Attendance: 65,408 (4,361 per game)
- Scoring leader: (Norway) Millie Sirum (7 points)

Official website
- www.iihf.com

The Division I Group A tournament was scheduled to be played in Shenzhen, China from 11 to 17 April 2023, but in March 2023, it was postponed. On 22 March, it was rescheduled to 20–26 August 2023.

=== Participating teams ===
Team	Qualification
Denmark	Placed 10th in Top Division last year and were relegated.
Norway	Placed 2nd in Division I A last year.
Slovakia	Placed 3rd in Division I A last year.
Austria	Placed 4th in Division I A last year.
Netherlands	Placed 5th in Division I A last year.
China	Hosts; placed 1st in Division I B last year and were promoted.

=== Match officials ===
Eight referees and linesmen were selected for the tournament.

Referees	Linesmen
(Canada) Amy Martin; (Canada) Michelle Stapleton; (Finland) Kaisa Ketonen; (Japan) Miyuki Nakayama; (Sweden) Ida Henriksson; (United States) Jestina Vichorek; (United States) Mackenzie Welter; (United States) Laura White	(Belgium) Marine Dinant; (Canada) Laura Gutasukas; (Canada) Kirsten Welsh; (Finland) Johanna Oksanen; (Hungary) Adrienn Paulheim; (Poland) Natalia Suchanek; (Slovakia) Eva Mária Moleková; (Switzerland) Jennifer Vicha

=== Final standings ===
Pos	Team	Pld	W	OTW	OTL	L	GF	GA	GD	Pts	Promotion or relegation
1	China (H)	5	5	0	0	0	14	6	+8	15	Promoted to the 2024 Top Division
2	Denmark	5	3	0	0	2	14	8	+6	9 (Note: Denmark 3 points, +4 GD; Austria 3 points, 0 GD; Netherlands 3 points, −4 GD.)	Promoted to the 2024 Top Division
3	Austria	5	3	0	0	2	8	5	+3	9	
4	Netherlands	5	3	0	0	2	13	12	+1	9	
5	Norway	5	1	0	0	4	11	21	−10	3	
6	Slovakia	5	0	0	0	5	4	12	−8	0	Relegated to the 2024 Division I B

Source: IIHF
Rules for classification: 1) points; 2) head-to-head points; 3) head-to-head goal difference; 4) head-to-head number of goals scored; 5) result against closest best-ranked team outside tied teams; 6) result against second-best ranked team outside tied teams; 7) seeding before tournament.
(H) Host

=== Match results ===
All times are local (Time in China – UTC+8).

20 August 2023; 13:00	Netherlands	1–6 (0–2, 1–1, 0–3)	Denmark	Shenzhen Universiade Sports Centre, Shenzhen; Attendance: 3,100

Game reference

Eline Gabriele
Goalies
Emma-Sofie Nordström
Referees:
(Sweden) Ida Henriksson
(United States) Jestina Vichorek
Linesmen:
(Finland) Johanna Oksanen
(Hungary) Adrienn Paulheim

	0–1	03:29 – Friis-Hansen (Aldous)
	0–2	07:09 – Skriver (Jakobsen, Refsgaard)
	0–3	32:15 – Jakobsen (Glud, Refsgaard)
Wielenga (SH) – 35:38	1–3
	1–4	46:05 – Glud (Jakobsen)
	1–5	48:27 – Skriver (Jensen)
	1–6	53:55 – Peters (Brix)

6 min
Penalties
4 min
16
Shots
34

20 August 2023; 16:30	Austria	4–0 (2–0, 2–0, 0–0)	Norway	Shenzhen Universiade Sports Centre, Shenzhen; Attendance: 2,800

Game reference

Selma Luggin
Goalies
Linnea Holterud Olsson
Referees:
(Finland) Kaisa Ketonen
(Canada) Michelle Stapleton
Linesmen:
(Belgium) Marine Dinant
(Poland) Natalia Suchanek

Grascher (Fazokas) (PP) – 07:04	1–0
Grascher (Kutzer) – 19:18	2–0
Meixner (Hofbauer, Kutzer) – 31:35	3–0
Meixner (Trummer) (PP) – 39:34	4–0

4 min
Penalties
8 min
35
Shots
31

20 August 2023; 20:00	China	1–0 (0–0, 1–0, 0–0)	Slovakia	Shenzhen Universiade Sports Centre, Shenzhen; Attendance: 6,673

Game reference
Chen Tiya	Goalies	Andrea Rišianová	Referees: (Japan) Miyuki Nakayama (United States) Laura White; Linesmen: (Canada) Laura Gutasukas (Canada) Kirsten Welsh
Kong (Yu, Zhang X.) – 38:32 / 1–0			Referees: (Japan) Miyuki Nakayama (United States) Laura White; Linesmen: (Canada) Laura Gutasukas (Canada) Kirsten Welsh
6 min	Penalties	16 min	Referees: (Japan) Miyuki Nakayama (United States) Laura White; Linesmen: (Canada) Laura Gutasukas (Canada) Kirsten Welsh
46	Shots	26	Referees: (Japan) Miyuki Nakayama (United States) Laura White; Linesmen: (Canada) Laura Gutasukas (Canada) Kirsten Welsh

21 August 2023; 13:00	Denmark	0–1 (0–0, 0–1, 0–0)	Austria	Shenzhen Universiade Sports Centre, Shenzhen; Attendance: 2,355

Game reference
Caroline Bjergstad	Goalies	Selma Luggin	Referees: (Canada) Michelle Stapleton (United States) Laura White; Linesmen: (Hungary) Adrienn Paulheim (Poland) Natalia Suchanek
0–1 / 21:05 – Meixner (Hofbauer, Fazokas)			Referees: (Canada) Michelle Stapleton (United States) Laura White; Linesmen: (Hungary) Adrienn Paulheim (Poland) Natalia Suchanek
8 min	Penalties	12 min	Referees: (Canada) Michelle Stapleton (United States) Laura White; Linesmen: (Hungary) Adrienn Paulheim (Poland) Natalia Suchanek
28	Shots	27	Referees: (Canada) Michelle Stapleton (United States) Laura White; Linesmen: (Hungary) Adrienn Paulheim (Poland) Natalia Suchanek

21 August 2023; 16:30	Slovakia	0–3 (0–0, 0–2, 0–1)	Netherlands	Shenzhen Universiade Sports Centre, Shenzhen; Attendance: 2,670

Game reference

Andrea Rišianová
Goalies
Eline Gabriele
Referees:
(Finland) Kaisa Ketonen
(United States) Jestina Vichorek
Linesmen:
(Belgium) Marine Dinant
(Finland) Johanna Oksanen

0–1	23:58 – De Jong (Barbier)
0–2	26:58 – Wielenga (Hamers, Van Nes)
0–3	48:16 – Van Nes (Huisman, Hamers) (PP)

10 min
Penalties
12 min
33
Shots
19

21 August 2023; 20:00	Norway	3–5 (1–0, 1–3, 1–2)	China	Shenzhen Universiade Sports Centre, Shenzhen; Attendance: 7,132

Game reference

Linnea Holterud Olsson
Goalies
Chen Tiya
Referees:
(Sweden) Ida Henriksson
(Canada) Amy Martin
Linesmen:
(Slovakia) Eva Mária Moleková
(Switzerland) Jennifer Vicha

Bergesen (Dalen, Malthe) – 08:26	1–0
Sirum (Brunvold, Fischer) – 23:02	2–0
	2–1	30:15 – Kang (Wang Y., Zhang X.) (PP)
	2–2	31:23 – Kong (Hu, Fang)
	2–3	36:50 – Fang (Hu, Kong)
Kruse (Sirum, Fischer) – 43:18	3–3
	3–4	48:45 – Kong (Hu, Wang Y.)
	3–5	58:00 – Zhang X. (EN)

12 min
Penalties
2 min
24
Shots
49

23 August 2023; 13:00	Norway	4–2 (1–0, 0–2, 3–0)	Slovakia	Shenzhen Universiade Sports Centre, Shenzhen; Attendance: 2,350

Game reference

Linnea Holterud Olsson
Goalies
Andrea Rišianová
Referees:
(Sweden) Ida Henriksson
(Canada) Michelle Stapleton
Linesmen:
(Belgium) Marine Dinant
(Switzerland) Jennifer Vicha

Jørgensen (Brunvold, Dalen) – 19:01	1–0
	1–1	25:12 – Bednárik (Kapičáková)
	1–2	34:16 – Korenková (L. Šulíková, Kúbeková)
Kruse (Fischer, Sirum) (PP) – 44:14	2–2
Fischer (Dalen, Bergesen) – 44:42	3–2
Biseth Engmann (Gundersen, Dalen) (PP) – 59:17	4–2

6 min
Penalties
4 min
19
Shots
32

23 August 2023; 16:30	Netherlands	2–1 (0–0, 1–1, 1–0)	Austria	Shenzhen Universiade Sports Centre, Shenzhen; Attendance: 2,730

Game reference

Eline Gabriele
Goalies
Selma Luggin
Referees:
(Japan) Miyuki Nakayama
(United States) Jestina Vichorek
Linesmen:
(Slovakia) Eva Mária Moleková
(Canada) Kirsten Welsh

Wielenga (Van Nes) – 27:23	1–0
	1–1	35:44 – Wittich (Meixner)
Van Nes (Even, Wielenga) (PP) – 55:23	2–1

12 min
Penalties
6 min
20
Shots
27

23 August 2023; 20:00	Denmark	2–4 (0–3, 1–0, 1–1)	China	Shenzhen Universiade Sports Centre, Shenzhen; Attendance: 7,631

Game reference

Emma-Sofie Nordström
Goalies
Chen Tiya
Referees:
(Finland) Kaisa Ketonen
(Canada) Amy Martin
Linesmen:
(Canada) Laura Gutasukas
(Poland) Natalia Suchanek

	0–1	01:53 – Guan (Zhu, Du)
	0–2	12:30 – Wang J. (Zhang M.)
	0–3	19:53 – Zhang X. (Kang)
Jensen (Oksbjerg, Kielstrup) – 23:17	1–3
	1–4	53:04 – Fang (Fei, Hu)
Jensen (Refsgaard) – 54:16	2–4

4 min
Penalties
8 min
28
Shots
31

24 August 2023; 13:00	Norway	3–6 (1–1, 2–3, 0–2)	Netherlands	Shenzhen Universiade Sports Centre, Shenzhen; Attendance: 2,415

Game reference

Kaja Ekle
Linnea Holterud Olsson
Goalies
Eline Gabriele
Referees:
(Canada) Amy Martin
(United States) Laura White
Linesmen:
(Slovakia) Eva Mária Moleková
(Finland) Johanna Oksanen

Sirum (Kruse, Fischer) – 03:28	1–0
	1–1	10:19 – Strople (Milders, Even) (PP)
Sirum (Kruse, Fischer) (PP) – 24:16	2–1
Sirum (Jørgensen, Kruse) – 25:29	3–1
	3–2	29:49 – Seppenwolde
	3–3	31:33 – Hamers (Collard, De Jong) (PP)
	3–4	33:13 – Huisman (Wielenga, Hamers) (PP)
	3–5	44:51 – Van Nes (Seppenwolde, Milders)
	3–6	59:37 – Van Nes (Milders, Wielenga) (EN)

14 min
Penalties
6 min
30
Shots
39

24 August 2023; 16:30	Slovakia	1–2 (1–1, 0–0, 0–1)	Denmark	Shenzhen Universiade Sports Centre, Shenzhen; Attendance: 2,530

Game reference

Andrea Rišianová
Goalies
Emma-Sofie Nordström
Referees:
(Japan) Miyuki Nakayama
(United States) Jestina Vichorek
Linesmen:
(Hungary) Adrienn Paulheim
(Switzerland) Jennifer Vicha

Kapičáková (Dobiašová, L. Šulíková) – 03:54	1–0
	1–1	18:05 – Jensen
	1–2	45:49 – Jakobsen (Glud)

2 min
Penalties
0 min
22
Shots
27

24 August 2023; 20:00	Austria	0–2 (0–0, 0–1, 0–1)	China	Shenzhen Universiade Sports Centre, Shenzhen; Attendance: 7,920

Game reference
Selma Luggin	Goalies	Chen Tiya	Referees: (Sweden) Ida Henriksson (Canada) Michelle Stapleton; Linesmen: (Canada) Laura Gutasukas (Canada) Kirsten Welsh
0–1 / 34:03 – Lin Q. (Lin N., Kang) (PP); 0–2 / 59:48 – Wang Y. (EN)			Referees: (Sweden) Ida Henriksson (Canada) Michelle Stapleton; Linesmen: (Canada) Laura Gutasukas (Canada) Kirsten Welsh
2 min	Penalties	0 min	Referees: (Sweden) Ida Henriksson (Canada) Michelle Stapleton; Linesmen: (Canada) Laura Gutasukas (Canada) Kirsten Welsh
30	Shots	30	Referees: (Sweden) Ida Henriksson (Canada) Michelle Stapleton; Linesmen: (Canada) Laura Gutasukas (Canada) Kirsten Welsh

26 August 2023; 13:00	Slovakia	1–2 (0–0, 0–1, 1–1)	Austria	Shenzhen Universiade Sports Centre, Shenzhen; Attendance: 2,057

Game reference

Andrea Rišianová
Goalies
Selma Luggin
Referees:
(Finland) Kaisa Ketonen
(United States) Laura White
Linesmen:
(Canada) Laura Gutasukas
(Poland) Natalia Suchanek

	0–1	34:40 – Fazokas (Meixner, Kutzer)
	0–2	44:32 – Grascher (Matzka, Hofbauer)
Rumanová (Blichová, Leskovjanská) – 56:22	1–2

4 min
Penalties
8 min
46
Shots
15

26 August 2023; 16:30	Denmark	4–1 (2–0, 0–1, 2–0)	Norway	Shenzhen Universiade Sports Centre, Shenzhen; Attendance: 2,957

Game reference

Emma-Sofie Nordström
Goalies
Linnea Holterud Olsson
Referees:
(Canada) Amy Martin
(Japan) Miyuki Nakayama
Linesmen:
(Slovakia) Eva Mária Moleková
(Finland) Johanna Oksanen

Jakobsen (Glud) – 03:10	1–0
Glud (Jakobsen) – 10:44	2–0
	2–1	21:02 – Sirum (Kruse, Malthe)
Friis-Hansen (Skott Dahl, Holm Peters) (PP) – 43:38	3–1
Holm Peters (Refsgaard) (EN) – 58:18	4–1

4 min
Penalties
4 min
37
Shots
24

26 August 2023; 20:00	China	2–1 (1–0, 0–1, 1–0)	Netherlands	Shenzhen Universiade Sports Centre, Shenzhen; Attendance: 10,088

Game reference

Chen Tiya
Goalies
Eline Gabriele
Referees:
(Sweden) Ida Henriksson
(Canada) Michelle Stapleton
Linesmen:
(Belgium) Marine Dinant
(Canada) Kirsten Welsh

Kong (Fang) – 16:27	1–0
	1–1	28:03 – Seppenwolde (Van Nes, Wielenga) (PP)
Kang (Lin N., Lin Q.) – 43:58	2–1

10 min
Penalties
4 min
36
Shots
36

=== Statistics ===
==== Scoring leaders ====
List shows the top skaters sorted by points, then goals.

Player	GP	G	A	Pts	+/−	PIM	POS
(Norway) Millie Sirum	5	5	2	7	+1	6	F
(Netherlands) Bieke van Nes	5	4	3	7	+1	6	F
(Netherlands) Savine Wielenga	5	3	4	7	+3	4	F
(Denmark) Josefine Jakobsen	5	3	3	6	+2	0	F
(Norway) Emilie Kruse	5	2	4	6	0	8	F
(Norway) Mathea Fischer	5	1	5	6	0	0	F
(China) Kong Minghui	5	4	1	5	+5	0	F
(Austria) Anna Meixner	5	3	2	5	+3	0	F
(Denmark) Nicoline Jensen	5	3	1	4	+2	2	F
(China) Fang Xin	5	2	2	4	+4	0	F
(Denmark) Silke Lave Glud	5	2	2	4	+2	4	F
(China) Kang Mulan	5	2	2	4	+1	0	F
(China) Zhang Xifang	5	2	2	4	+3	8	F

GP = Games played; G = Goals; A = Assists; Pts = Points; +/− = Plus/Minus; PIM = Penalties in Minutes; POS = Position
Source: IIHF.com

==== Goaltending leaders ====
Only the top five goaltenders, based on save percentage, who have played at least 40% of their team's minutes, are included in this list.

Player	TOI	GA	GAA	SA	Sv%	SO
(Austria) Selma Luggin	297:49	4	0.81	154	97.40	2
(China) Chen Tiya	300:00	6	1.20	147	95.92	2
(Denmark) Emma-Sofie Nordström	237:47	7	1.77	93	92.47	0
(Netherlands) Eline Gabriele	299:04	12	2.41	159	92.45	1
(Norway) Linnea Holterud Olsson	259:48	14	3.23	167	91.62	0

TOI = time on ice (minutes:seconds); SA = shots against; GA = goals against; GAA = goals against average; Sv% = save percentage; SO = shutouts
Source: IIHF.com

=== Awards ===
Position	Player
Goaltender	(Austria) Selma Luggin
Defenceman	(China) Lin Qiqi
Forward	(Netherlands) Savine Wielenga

== Group B tournament ==
2023 IIHF Women's World Championship Division I B

Tournament details
- Host country: South Korea
- City: Suwon
- Venue: 1 (in 1 host city)
- Dates: 17–23 April
- Teams: 6

Tournament statistics
- Games played: 15
- Goals scored: 54 (3.6 per game)
- Attendance: 8,093 (540 per game)
- Scoring leader: (Slovenia) Sara Confidenti (7 points)

Official website
- www.iihf.com

The Division I Group B tournament was played in Suwon, South Korea, from 17 to 23 April 2023.

=== Participating teams ===
Team	Qualification
Poland	Placed 2nd in Division I B last year.
Italy	Placed 3rd in Division I B last year.
Kazakhstan	Placed 4th in Division I B last year.
South Korea	Hosts; placed 5th in Division I B last year.
Slovenia	Placed 6th in Division I B last year.
Great Britain	Placed 1st in Division II A last year and were promoted.

=== Match officials ===
Four referees and seven linesmen were selected for the tournament.

Referees	Linesmen
(France) Marie Picavet; (Slovakia) Nikoleta Celárová; (Switzerland) Michaela Matejova; (United States) Melissa Doyle	(Australia) Bethany Bowshall; (Canada) Melissa Brunn; (South Korea) Ma Sang-hee; (Switzerland) Magali Anex dit Chenaud; (Switzerland) Jamie Monard; (Sweden) Alexandra Kohl; (United States) Brooke Branson

=== Final standings ===
Pos	Team	Pld	W	OTW	OTL	L	GF	GA	GD	Pts	Promotion or relegation
1	South Korea (H)	5	4	1	0	0	15	6	+9	14	Promoted to the 2024 Division I A
2	Poland	5	4	0	0	1	8	7	+1	12	
3	Italy	5	3	0	1	1	10	5	+5	10	
4	Slovenia	5	1	1	0	3	10	14	−4	5	
5	Great Britain	5	1	0	1	3	7	11	−4	4	
6	Kazakhstan	5	0	0	0	5	4	11	−7	0	Relegated to the 2024 Division II A

Source: IIHF
Rules for classification: 1) points; 2) head-to-head points; 3) head-to-head goal difference; 4) head-to-head number of goals scored; 5) result against closest best-ranked team outside tied teams; 6) result against second-best ranked team outside tied teams; 7) seeding before tournament.
(H) Host

=== Match results ===
All times are local (Time in South Korea – UTC+9).

17 April 2023; 12:15	Great Britain	1–0 (0–0, 0–0, 1–0)	Kazakhstan	Suwon Ice Rink, Suwon; Attendance: 35

Game reference
Nicole Jackson	Goalies	Arina Chshyokolova	Referee: (France) Marie Picavet; Linesmen: (Switzerland) Magali Anex dit Chenaud (Australia) Bethany Bowshall
Henry (PS) – 49:00 / 1–0			Referee: (France) Marie Picavet; Linesmen: (Switzerland) Magali Anex dit Chenaud (Australia) Bethany Bowshall
10 min	Penalties	10 min	Referee: (France) Marie Picavet; Linesmen: (Switzerland) Magali Anex dit Chenaud (Australia) Bethany Bowshall
34	Shots	14	Referee: (France) Marie Picavet; Linesmen: (Switzerland) Magali Anex dit Chenaud (Australia) Bethany Bowshall

17 April 2023; 15:45	Slovenia	0–2 (0–0, 0–1, 0–1)	Poland	Suwon Ice Rink, Suwon; Attendance: 50

Game reference
Pia Dukarič	Goalies	Martyna Sass	Referee: (Slovakia) Nikoleta Celárová; Linesmen: (Sweden) Alexandra Kohl (South Korea) Ma Sang-hee
0–1 / 22:20 – Brzezińska (Onyshchenko, Tomczok); 0–2 / 42:08 – Onyshchenko (Brzezińska, Tomczok)			Referee: (Slovakia) Nikoleta Celárová; Linesmen: (Sweden) Alexandra Kohl (South Korea) Ma Sang-hee
6 min	Penalties	6 min	Referee: (Slovakia) Nikoleta Celárová; Linesmen: (Sweden) Alexandra Kohl (South Korea) Ma Sang-hee
18	Shots	52	Referee: (Slovakia) Nikoleta Celárová; Linesmen: (Sweden) Alexandra Kohl (South Korea) Ma Sang-hee

17 April 2023; 19:15	South Korea	2–1 OT (0–0, 1–1, 0–0) (OT: 1–0)	Italy	Suwon Ice Rink, Suwon; Attendance: 650

Game reference

Huh Eun-bee
Goalies
Martina Fedel
Referee:
(Switzerland) Michaela Matejova
Linesmen:
(United States) Brooke Branson
(Switzerland) Jamie Monard

Lee E. (Park Yo., Park Ji.) – 22:49	1–0
	1–1	24:24 – Furlani (Fantin)
Kim H. (Lee E.) (PP) – 61:16	2–1

16 min
Penalties
4 min
25
Shots
40

18 April 2023; 12:15	Kazakhstan	1–2 (0–1, 0–0, 1–1)	Slovenia	Suwon Ice Rink, Suwon; Attendance: 30

Game reference

Arina Shchyokolova
Goalies
Pia Dukarič
Referee:
(United States) Melissa Doyle
Linesmen:
(Canada) Melissa Brunn
(South Korea) Ma Sang-hee

	0–1	03:10 – Confidenti (Pren)
	0–2	45:08 – Pren (Confidenti, Nylaander) (PP)
Golotvina (D. Sayakhatkyzy) – 45:21	1–2

4 min
Penalties
4 min
57
Shots
36

18 April 2023; 15:45	Italy	2–0 (0–0, 1–0, 1–0)	Great Britain	Suwon Ice Rink, Suwon; Attendance: 60

Game reference
Elisa Biondi	Goalies	Nicole Jackson	Referee: (Switzerland) Michaela Matejova; Linesmen: (Australia) Bethany Bowshall (Switzerland) Jamie Monard
Caumo (Gius) (SH) – 21:14 / 1–0; Fantin (Mattivi, Furlani) (PP2) – 52:01 / 2–0			Referee: (Switzerland) Michaela Matejova; Linesmen: (Australia) Bethany Bowshall (Switzerland) Jamie Monard
16 min	Penalties	16 min	Referee: (Switzerland) Michaela Matejova; Linesmen: (Australia) Bethany Bowshall (Switzerland) Jamie Monard
47	Shots	16	Referee: (Switzerland) Michaela Matejova; Linesmen: (Australia) Bethany Bowshall (Switzerland) Jamie Monard

18 April 2023; 19:15	Poland	0–4 (0–1, 0–2, 0–1)	South Korea	Suwon Ice Rink, Suwon; Attendance: 1,000

Game reference

Martyna Sass
Goalies
Huh Eun-bee
Referee:
(Slovakia) Nikoleta Celárová
Linesmen:
(Switzerland) Magali Anex dit Chenaud
(United States) Brooke Branson

0–1	16:25 – Park C. (Han) (PP)
0–2	29:43 – Kim H. (Choi J.)
0–3	33:07 – Choi J. (Im, Kim H.)
0–4	42:58 – Han (Park Jong-a.)

8 min
Penalties
14 min
35
Shots
30

20 April 2023; 12:15	Poland	2–1 (0–0, 0–1, 2–0)	Great Britain	Suwon Ice Rink, Suwon; Attendance: 23

Game reference

Martyna Sass
Goalies
Nicole Jackson
Referee:
(Switzerland) Michaela Matejova
Linesmen:
(Switzerland) Magali Anex dit Chenaud
(Sweden) Alexandra Kohl

	0–1	29:11 – Hill (C. Jackson)
Gogoc (Onyshchenko, Sikorska) – 40:46	1–1
Chrapek (Sikorska, Czarnecka) (PP) – 58:54	2–1

6 min
Penalties
6 min
31
Shots
30

20 April 2023; 15:45	Italy	3–0 (1–0, 2–0, 0–0)	Kazakhstan	Suwon Ice Rink, Suwon; Attendance: 295

Game reference

Elisa Biondi
Goalies
Arina Shchyokolova
Referee:
(United States) Melissa Doyle
Linesmen:
(United States) Brooke Branson
(South Korea) Ma Sang-hee

Varano (Lobis, Niccolai) (PP) – 15:18	1–0
Abatangelo (Lobis) – 30:44	2–0
Campo Bagatin (Saletta, Heidenberger) – 38:09	3–0

12 min
Penalties
12 min
40
Shots
26

20 April 2023; 19:15	Slovenia	2–4 (1–1, 0–1, 1–2)	South Korea	Suwon Ice Rink, Suwon; Attendance: 1,250

Game reference

Pia Dukarič
Goalies
Huh Eun-bee
Referee:
(France) Marie Picavet
Linesmen:
(Canada) Melissa Brunn
(Switzerland) Jamie Monard

Confidenti (Podrekar) – 05:41	1–0
	1–1	08:26 – Han (Park Jong-a.) (PP)
	1–2	27:29 – Lee E. (Kim S.) (EA)
	1–3	44:12 – Park Jong-a. (Lee S., Im)
	1–4	47:41 – Lee E. (Park Jong-a., Han) (PP)
Confidenti (Pren) (PP) – 49:15	2–4

12 min
Penalties
4 min
14
Shots
44

22 April 2023; 12:15	Italy	4–2 (3–1, 1–1, 0–0)	Slovenia	Suwon Ice Rink, Suwon; Attendance: 200

Game reference

Martina Fedel
Goalies
Pia Dukarič
Referee:
(Switzerland) Michaela Matejova
Linesmen:
(Canada) Melissa Brunn
(Switzerland) Jamie Monard

Gius (Fantin) – 06:13	1–0
Stocker (Roccella) – 06:56	2–0
	2–1	10:27 – Nylaander (Pezdir, Blazinšek)
Larger (Gius, Stocker) (PP) – 18:26	3–1
	3–2	21:54 – Confidenti (Nylaander)
Roccella (Caumo) (PP) – 27:22	4–2

4 min
Penalties
18 min
66
Shots
10

22 April 2023; 15:45	South Korea	3–2 (1–0, 2–2, 0–0)	Great Britain	Suwon Ice Rink, Suwon; Attendance: 1,700

Game reference

Hun Eun-bee
Goalies
Ella Howard
Referee:
(United States) Melissa Doyle
Linesmen:
(Australia) Bethany Bowshall
(Sweden) Alexandra Kohl

Park Jong-a. (Lee E., Kim T.) – 14:32	1–0
Kim H. (Park Ji.) (PP) – 24:44	2–0
	2–1	28:39 – Marsden (Henry)
	2–2	32:30 – Gale (Hill) (PP)
Han (Kim S., Lee E.) (PP) – 39:59	3–2

8 min
Penalties
8 min
23
Shots
18

22 April 2023; 19:15	Kazakhstan	2–3 (1–1, 0–0, 1–2)	Poland	Suwon Ice Rink, Suwon; Attendance: 200

Game reference

Arina Shchyokolova
Goalies
Martyna Sass
Referee:
(Slovakia) Nikoleta Celárová
Linesmen:
(Switzerland) Magali Anex dit Chenaud
(South Korea) Ma Sang-hee

Moldabay (Filimonova, Orazbayeva) (PP) – 06:30	1–0
	1–1	12:40 – Chrapek (Późniewska, Czarnecka) (PP)
	1–2	40:32 – Chrapek (Onyshchenko, Późniewska) (PP)
Golotvina (Kozgulova) – 54:41	2–2
	2–3	59:22 – Późniewska (Dziwok)

12 min
Penalties
12 min
30
Shots
42

23 April 2023; 12:15	Great Britain	3–4 GWS (1–0, 1–2, 1–1) (OT: 0–0) (SO: 0–1)	Slovenia	Suwon Ice Rink, Suwon; Attendance: 100

Game reference

Nicole Jackson
Goalies
Pia Dukarič
Referee:
(Slovakia) Nikoleta Celárová
Linesmen:
(South Korea) Ma Sang-hee
(Switzerland) Jamie Monard

Beal (Henry, Bloom) (PP) – 03:07	1–0
	1–1	22:33 – Nylaander (Pezdir)
Marsden (Douglas, Harris) – 23:43	2–1
	2–2	25:58 – Pren (Confidenti)
Headland (Gale, Cartwright) – 55:13	3–2
	3–3	56:10 – Confidenti (Pren) (PP)

Henry (miss)
Marsden (miss)
Towns (miss)
Cartwright (miss)
Gale (miss)
Shootout
(miss) Nylaander
(miss) Pezdir
(miss) Blazinšek
Confidenti
2 min
Penalties
6 min
48
Shots
33

23 April 2023; 15:45	Kazakhstan	1–2 (1–1, 0–0, 0–1)	South Korea	Suwon Ice Rink, Suwon; Attendance: 2,300

Game reference

Arina Shchyokolova
Goalies
Hun Eun-bee
Referee:
(France) Marie Picavet
Linesmen:
(Australia) Bethany Bowshall
(Canada) Melissa Brunn

	0–1	04:09 – Han (Park Jong-a., Park C.) (PP)
Sviridova (Ivanchenko, Aldabergenova) – 09:13	1–1
	1–2	56:23 – Kim H. (Kim T., Choi J.)

10 min
Penalties
4 min
18
Shots
41

23 April 2023; 19:15	Poland	1–0 (0–0, 1–0, 0–0)	Italy	Suwon Ice Rink, Suwon; Attendance: 200

Game reference
Martyna Sass	Goalies	Elisa Biondi	Referee: (United States) Melissa Doyle; Linesmen: (Switzerland) Magali Anex dit Chenaud (United States) Brooke Branson
Późniewska (Dziwok) – 31:14 / 1–0			Referee: (United States) Melissa Doyle; Linesmen: (Switzerland) Magali Anex dit Chenaud (United States) Brooke Branson
10 min	Penalties	8 min	Referee: (United States) Melissa Doyle; Linesmen: (Switzerland) Magali Anex dit Chenaud (United States) Brooke Branson
17	Shots	49	Referee: (United States) Melissa Doyle; Linesmen: (Switzerland) Magali Anex dit Chenaud (United States) Brooke Branson

=== Statistics ===
==== Scoring leaders ====
List shows the top skaters sorted by points, then goals.

Player	GP	G	A	Pts	+/−	PIM	POS
(Slovenia) Sara Confidenti	5	5	2	7	+1	2	F
(South Korea) Han Soo-jin	5	4	2	6	+2	2	F
(South Korea) Kim Hee-won	5	4	2	6	+5	8	F
(South Korea) Park Jong-ah	5	2	4	6	+3	2	F
(Slovenia) Pia Pren	5	2	3	5	0	10	F
(South Korea) Lee Eun-ji	5	2	2	4	+2	0	F
(Slovenia) Arwen Nylaander	5	2	2	4	+2	4	F
(Poland) Karolina Późniewska	5	2	2	4	+1	6	F
(Poland) Tetiana Onyshchenko	5	1	3	4	+2	6	F
(Poland) Klaudia Chrapek	5	3	0	3	−1	0	D

GP = Games played; G = Goals; A = Assists; Pts = Points; +/− = Plus/Minus; PIM = Penalties in Minutes; POS = Position
Source: IIHF.com

==== Goaltending leaders ====
Only the top five goaltenders, based on save percentage, who have played at least 40% of their team's minutes, are included in this list.

Player	TOI	GA	GAA	SA	Sv%	SO
(Italy) Elisa Biondi	179:10	1	0.33	59	98.31	2
(Poland) Martyna Sass	300:00	7	1.40	157	95.54	2
(South Korea) Hun Eun-bee	301:16	6	1.19	119	95.20	1
(Slovenia) Pia Dukarič	303:16	14	2.77	253	94.76	0
(United Kingdom) Nicole Jackson	245:00	7	1.71	117	94.34	1

TOI = time on ice (minutes:seconds); SA = shots against; GA = goals against; GAA = goals against average; Sv% = save percentage; SO = shutouts
Source: IIHF.com

=== Awards ===
Position	Player
Goaltender	(Slovenia) Pia Dukarič
Defenceman	(Italy) Nadia Mattivi
Forward	(South Korea) Park Jong-ah
