= 2022 IIHF Women's World Championship Division I =

Tournament details
- Host countries: France; Poland
- Venues: 2 (in 2 host cities)
- Dates: 24–30 April; 8–14 April
- Teams: 11

The 2022 IIHF Women's World Championship Division I consisted of two international ice hockey tournaments of the 2022 Women's Ice Hockey World Championships organized by the International Ice Hockey Federation (IIHF). Division I A and Division I B represent the second and third tier of the IIHF World Women's Championship.

All divisions stayed put after all events last year were cancelled due to the COVID-19 pandemic.

France won Group A and were promoted to the Top Division, while China got promoted after winning the Group B tournament. Due to Russia's exclusion, no team was relegated this season.

== Group A tournament ==
2022 IIHF Women's World Championship Division I A

Tournament details
- Host country: France
- City: Angers
- Venue: 1 (in 1 host city)
- Dates: 24–30 April
- Teams: 5

Tournament statistics
- Games played: 10
- Goals scored: 48 (4.8 per game)
- Attendance: 14,993 (1,499 per game)
- Scoring leader: (France) Chloé Aurard (8 points)

Official website
- www.iihf.com

The Division I Group A tournament was played in Angers, France, from 24 to 30 April 2022.

=== Participating teams ===
Team	Qualification
France	Hosts; placed 10th in 2019 Top Division and were relegated.
Norway	Placed 3rd in 2019 Division I A.
Austria	Placed 4th in 2019 Division I A.
Slovakia	Placed 5th in 2019 Division I A.
Netherlands	Placed 1st in 2019 Division I B and were promoted.

=== Match officials ===
Six referees and six linesmen are selected for the tournament.

Referees	Linesmen
(Canada) Brandy Dewar; (France) Marie Picavet; (Finland) Henna Åberg; (Finland) Johanna Taurianen; (Latvia) Agnese Kārkliņa; (Norway) Aina Hove	(Canada) Judith Closset; (United Kingdom) Amy Lack; (Hungary) Zóra Gottlibet; (Sweden) Julia Johansson; (Switzerland) Anina Egli; (United States) Erika Greenen

=== Final standings ===
Pos	Team	Pld	W	OTW	OTL	L	GF	GA	GD	Pts	Promotion
1	France (H)	4	3	0	1	0	14	5	+9	10	Promoted to the 2023 Top Division
2	Norway	4	2	0	1	1	13	10	+3	7	
3	Slovakia	4	2	0	0	2	7	8	−1	6 (Note: Austria 1–2 Slovakia)	
4	Austria	4	0	3	0	1	10	8	+2	6	
5	Netherlands	4	0	0	1	3	4	17	−13	1	

Source: IIHF
Rules for classification: 1) points; 2) head-to-head points; 3) head-to-head goal difference; 4) head-to-head number of goals scored; 5) result against closest best-ranked team outside tied teams; 6) result against second-best ranked team outside tied teams; 7) seeding before tournament.
(H) Host

=== Match results ===
All times are local (Central European Summer Time – UTC+2)

24 April 2022; 16:00	Netherlands	1–2 GWS (0–0, 0–1, 1–0) (OT: 0–0) (SO: 0–1)	Austria	Angers IceParc, Angers; Attendance: 1,015

Game reference
Eline Gabriele	Goalies	Selma Luggin	Referees: (Canada) Brandy Dewar (Finland) Johanna Taurianen; Linesmen: (United States) Erika Greenen (Sweden) Julia Johansson
/ 0–1 / 31:10 – Wittich (Trummer, Beiter) (PP); Zwarthoed (Hamers, Wielenga) – 46:58 / 1–1			Referees: (Canada) Brandy Dewar (Finland) Johanna Taurianen; Linesmen: (United States) Erika Greenen (Sweden) Julia Johansson
	Shootout	Wittich	Referees: (Canada) Brandy Dewar (Finland) Johanna Taurianen; Linesmen: (United States) Erika Greenen (Sweden) Julia Johansson
16 min	Penalties	4 min	Referees: (Canada) Brandy Dewar (Finland) Johanna Taurianen; Linesmen: (United States) Erika Greenen (Sweden) Julia Johansson
11	Shots	48	Referees: (Canada) Brandy Dewar (Finland) Johanna Taurianen; Linesmen: (United States) Erika Greenen (Sweden) Julia Johansson

24 April 2022; 19:30	Slovakia	1–2 (1–1, 0–1, 0–0)	Norway	Angers IceParc, Angers; Attendance: 730

Game reference

Andrea Orolínová
Goalies
Ena Nystrøm
Referees:
(Latvia) Agnese Kārkliņa
(France) Marie Picavet
Linesmen:
(Switzerland) Anina Egli
(Hungary) Zóra Gottlibet

	0–1	01:02 – Tendenes (Kruse, Haug Hansen)
Ištocyová (PP) – 12:29	1–1
	1–2	37:31 – Berge (Kruse, Morset) (PP)

8 min
Penalties
10 min
37
Shots
24

25 April 2022; 16:00	Norway	7–1 (2–1, 3–0, 2–0)	Netherlands	Angers IceParc, Angers; Attendance: 634

Game reference

Ena Nystrøm
Goalies
Eline Gabriele
Claudia van Leeuwen
Referees:
(Finland) Henna Åberg
(Finland) Johanna Taurianen
Linesmen:
(Canada) Judith Closset
(Sweden) Julia Johansson

Brunvold (Jørgensen, Kruse) – 03:45	1–0
L. Pedersen (Bergesen) (PP) – 15:07	2–0
	2–1	17:33 – Wielenga (Hamers, Zwarthoed)
L. Pedersen (Dalen, Tendenes) (PP) – 21:48	3–1
Dalen (Brunvold, Bergesen) – 22:38	4–1
Bialik (Bergesen, Dalen) (PP) – 28:34	5–1
Haug Hansen (Berge, Fischer) (PP) – 48:45	6–1
Kruse (Brunvold, Morset) – 51:11	7–1

4 min
Penalties
14 min
34
Shots
25

25 April 2022; 19:30	France	4–0 (2–0, 1–0, 1–0)	Slovakia	Angers IceParc, Angers; Attendance: 1,894

Game reference

Caroline Baldin
Goalies
Andrea Orolínová
Referees:
(Norway) Aina Hove
(Latvia) Agnese Kārkliņa
Linesmen:
(Switzerland) Anina Egli
(United Kingdom) Amy Lack

Aurard (Baudrit) – 10:25	1–0
Allemoz (Baudrit, Villiot) – 12:52	2–0
Allemoz (Aurard, Baudrit) – 24:01	3–0
Duvin (Villiot, Aurard) (PP2) – 47:33	4–0

6 min
Penalties
12 min
33
Shots
26

27 April 2022; 16:00	Norway	3–4 OT (0–2, 3–0, 0–1) (OT: 0–1)	Austria	Angers IceParc, Angers; Attendance: 993

Game reference

Ena Nystrøm
Goalies
Selma Luggin
Referees:
(Norway) Aina Hove
(France) Marie Picavet
Linesmen:
(Canada) Judith Closset
(Hungary) Zóra Gottlibet

	0–1	12:19 – Fazokas (PP2)
	0–2	13:13 – Grascher (Matzka) (PP)
Fischer (Bergesen, Kruse) (PP) – 26:05	1–2
Bjelland (Nyberg) – 27:09	2–2
L. Pedersen (Bergesen, Bialik) (PP2) – 39:45	3–2
	3–3	52:14 – Beiter
	3–4	60:40 – Meixner (Schafzahl, Fazokas)

16 min
Penalties
8 min
19
Shots
47

27 April 2022; 19:30	France	4–1 (1–0, 2–1, 1–0)	Netherlands	Angers IceParc, Angers; Attendance: 2,468

Game reference

Caroline Baldin
Goalies
Eline Gabriele
Referees:
(Finland) Henna Åberg
(Canada) Brandy Dewar
Linesmen:
(United States) Erika Greenen
(United Kingdom) Amy Lack

Barbirati (Mesplède, Villiot) – 14:03	1–0
Duvin (Aurard, Rozier) – 34:55	2–0
	2–1	38:26 – Hamers (Milders, Zwarthoed) (PP)
Parment (Allemoz) (PP) – 38:49	3–1
Aurard (Duvin) (SH, EN) – 59:00	4–1

12 min
Penalties
6 min
43
Shots
21

28 April 2022; 16:00	Slovakia	4–1 (0–0, 2–1, 2–0)	Netherlands	Angers IceParc, Angers; Attendance: 423

Game reference

Nikola Zimková
Goalies
Eline Gabriele
Referees:
(Canada) Brandy Dewar
(Latvia) Agnese Kārkliņa
Linesmen:
(Switzerland) Anina Egli
(United Kingdom) Amy Lack

Nemčeková (Maskaľová) – 23:06	1–0
	1–1	32:43 – Zwarthoed (Van Nes, Wielenga) (PP)
Nemčeková (Vysokajová) – 37:39	2–1
Ištocyová (Kúbeková) (PP) – 51:28	3–1
Korenková (Čupková, Drábeková) – 54:05	4–1

2 min
Penalties
10 min
33
Shots
22

28 April 2022; 19:30	Austria	3–2 OT (0–1, 2–0, 0–1) (OT: 1–0)	France	Angers IceParc, Angers; Attendance: 2,310

Game reference

Selma Luggin
Goalies
Caroline Baldin
Referees:
(Finland) Henna Åberg
(Finland) Johanna Taurianen
Linesmen:
(Hungary) Zóra Gottlibet
(Sweden) Julia Johansson

	0–1	14:14 – Parment (Duvin)
Meixner (Trummer, Wittich) (PP) – 20:53	1–1
Schafzahl (Meixner) – 23:18	2–1
	2–2	56:50 – Aurard (Duvin)
Schafzahl (Meixner) – 60:15	3–2

6 min
Penalties
4 min
35
Shots
22

30 April 2022; 16:00	Austria	1–2 (0–1, 1–1, 0–0)	Slovakia	Angers IceParc, Angers; Attendance: 940

Game reference

Selma Luggin
Goalies
Nikola Zimková
Referees:
(Norway) Aina Hove
(France) Marie Picavet
Linesmen:
(Hungary) Zóra Gottlibet
(United Kingdom) Amy Lack

	0–1	00:37 – Korenková
	0–2	35:13 – Halušková (Hlinková, Čupková)
Fazokas – 36:05	1–2

4 min
Penalties
10 min
29
Shots
19

30 April 2022; 19:30	France	4–1 (1–0, 2–0, 1–1)	Norway	Angers IceParc, Angers; Attendance: 3,586

Game reference

Caroline Baldin
Goalies
Ena Nystrøm
Referees:
(Canada) Brandy Dewar
(Latvia) Agnese Kārkliņa
Linesmen:
(Canada) Judith Closset
(United States) Erika Greenen

Duvin (Aurard) (SH) – 08:42	1–0
Aurard (Duvin, Quarto) – 30:28	2–0
Rozier (Duvin) – 32:07	3–0
	3–1	48:15 – Dalen (Jørgensen)
Escudero (Baudrit) (PP) – 51:28	4–1

6 min
Penalties
6 min
40
Shots
37

=== Statistics ===
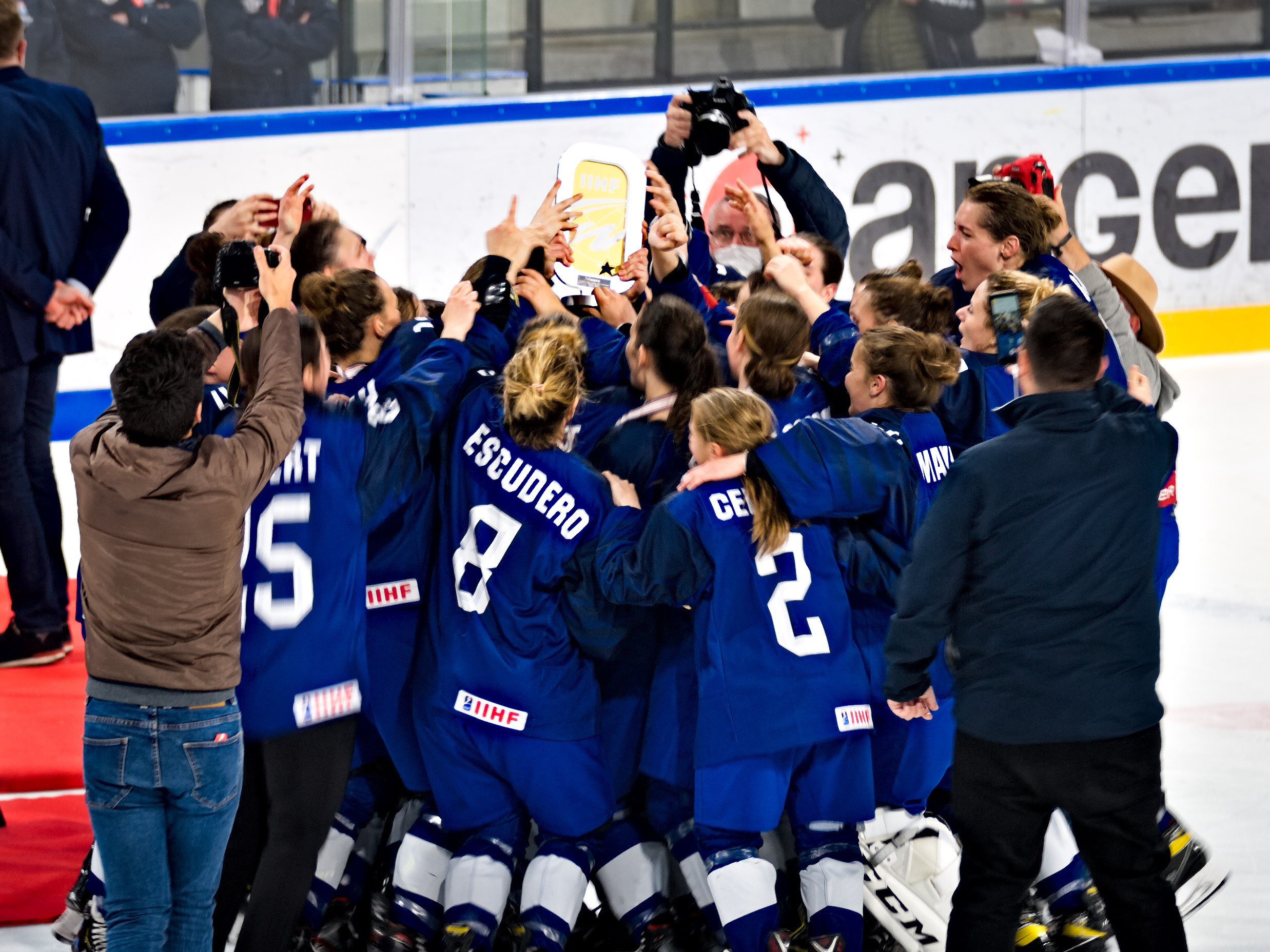
French team celebrating Division IA championship

==== Scoring leaders ====
List shows the top skaters sorted by points, then goals.

Player	GP	G	A	Pts	+/−	PIM	POS
(France) Chloé Aurard	4	4	4	8	+9	0	F
(France) Estelle Duvin	4	3	5	8	+7	4	F
(Norway) Emilie Kruse	4	1	4	6	+2	6	F
(Norway) Emma Bergesen	4	0	5	5	+2	0	D
(Norway) Andrea Dalen	4	2	2	4	+1	0	F
(Austria) Anna Meixner	4	2	2	4	+2	4	F
(Netherlands) Julie Zwarthoed	4	2	2	4	−3	4	F
(France) Lore Baudrit	4	0	4	4	+3	2	F
(Norway) Lotte Pedersen	4	3	0	3	−1	4	F
(France) Marion Allemoz	4	2	1	3	+2	0	F

GP = Games played; G = Goals; A = Assists; Pts = Points; +/− = Plus/minus; PIM = Penalties in minutes; POS = Position
Source: IIHF.com

==== Goaltending leaders ====
Only the top five goaltenders, based on save percentage, who have played at least 40% of their team's minutes, are included in this list.

Player	TOI	GA	GAA	SA	Sv%	SO
(Slovakia) Nikola Zimková	120:00	2	1.00	51	96.08	0
(France) Caroline Baldin	240:15	5	1.25	119	95.80	1
(Norway) Ena Nystrøm	237:34	10	2.53	149	93.29	0
(Netherlands) Eline Gabriele	205:58	11	3.20	132	91.67	0
(Slovakia) Andrea Orolínová	119:12	6	3.02	57	89.47	0

TOI = time on ice (minutes:seconds); SA = shots against; GA = goals against; GAA = goals against average; Sv% = save percentage; SO = shutouts
Source: IIHF.com

=== Awards ===
Position	Player
Goaltender	(France) Caroline Baldin
Defenceman	(Norway) Emma Bergesen
Forward	(France) Chloé Aurard

== Group B tournament ==
2022 IIHF Women's World Championship Division I B

Tournament details
- Host country: Poland
- City: Katowice
- Venue: 1 (in 1 host city)
- Dates: 8–14 April
- Teams: 6

Tournament statistics
- Games played: 15
- Goals scored: 86 (5.73 per game)
- Attendance: 3,839 (256 per game)
- Scoring leader(s): (China) Rachel Llanes (China) Leah Lum (15 points)

Official website
- www.iihf.com

The Division I Group B tournament was played in Katowice, Poland, from 8 to 14 April 2022.

=== Participating teams ===
Team	Qualification
Italy	Placed 6th in 2019 Division I A and were relegated.
South Korea	Placed 2nd in 2019 Division I B.
Poland	Hosts; placed 3rd in 2019 Division I B.
China	Placed 4th in 2019 Division I B.
Kazakhstan	Placed 5th in 2019 Division I B.
Slovenia	Placed 1st in 2019 Division II A and were promoted.

=== Match officials ===
Four referees and six linesmen were selected for the tournament.

Referees	Linesmen
(Canada) Marie-Ève Couture; (Czech Republic) Gabriela Malá; (Sweden) Ida Henriksson; (United States) Laura White	(France) Sueva Torribio; (United Kingdom) Faye Andrews; (Poland) Natalia Suchanek; (Slovenia) Ines Confidenti; (Spain) Alba Calero; (Switzerland) Michele Müller

=== Final standings ===
Pos	Team	Pld	W	OTW	OTL	L	GF	GA	GD	Pts	Promotion or relegation
1	China	5	5	0	0	0	38	9	+29	15	Promoted to the 2023 Division I A
2	Poland (H)	5	3	1	0	1	16	13	+3	11	
3	Italy	5	2	0	1	2	11	15	−4	7	
4	Kazakhstan	5	2	0	0	3	10	11	−1	6	
5	South Korea	5	1	0	0	4	5	15	−10	3 (Note: South Korea 2–1 Slovenia)	
6	Slovenia	5	1	0	0	4	6	23	−17	3	

Source: IIHF
Rules for classification: 1) points; 2) head-to-head points; 3) head-to-head goal difference; 4) head-to-head number of goals scored; 5) result against closest best-ranked team outside tied teams; 6) result against second-best ranked team outside tied teams; 7) seeding before tournament.
(H) Host

=== Match results ===
All times are local (Central European Summer Time – UTC+2)

8 April 2022; 13:00	Slovenia	3–1 (2–0, 0–1, 1–0)	Italy	Janów Arena, Janów-Nikiszowiec; Attendance: 50

Game reference

Pia Dukarič
Goalies
Martina Fedel
Referee:
(Sweden) Ida Henriksson
Linesmen:
(Poland) Natalia Suchanek
(France) Sueva Torribio

Confidenti (Pren) – 01:56	1–0
Pren (Confidenti) – 04:00	2–0
	2–1	34:40 – Mattivi
Confidenti (Pren) – 52:41	3–1

6 min
Penalties
4 min
17
Shots
55

8 April 2022; 16:30	China	5–0 (1–0, 1–0, 3–0)	South Korea	Janów Arena, Janów-Nikiszowiec; Attendance: 100

Game reference

Tia Chan
Goalies
Cheon Hyo-seo
Referee:
(Canada) Marie-Ève Couture
Linesmen:
(Slovenia) Ines Confidenti
(Switzerland) Michele Müller

Segedi (Guang, Zhu) – 13:09	1–0
Lum (Wong, Llanes) – 29:08	2–0
Miller (Llanes) – 44:24	3–0
Zhu (Liu) – 45:38	4–0
Betinol (Liu) – 51:00	5–0

6 min
Penalties
2 min
40
Shots
13

8 April 2022; 20:00	Kazakhstan	1–3 (1–1, 0–2, 0–0)	Poland	Janów Arena, Janów-Nikiszowiec; Attendance: 511

Game reference

Arina Shyokolova
Goalies
Martyna Sass
Referee:
(Czech Republic) Gabriela Malá
Linesmen:
(United Kingdom) Faye Andrews
(Spain) Alba Calero

Koroleva (Moldabay) – 01:50	1–0
	1–1	13:55 – Późniewska (Chrapek) (PP)
	1–2	35:33 – Zielińska (Późniewska, Łaskawska) (PP)
	1–3	38:18 – Tomczok (Gogoc) (PP)

12 min
Penalties
14 min
22
Shots
32

9 April 2022; 13:00	South Korea	1–5 (0–2, 0–3, 1–0)	Kazakhstan	Janów Arena, Janów-Nikiszowiec; Attendance: 102

Game reference

Cheon Hyo-seo
Jang In-hye
Goalies
Darya Dmitrieva
Referee:
(United States) Laura White
Linesmen:
(Spain) Alba Calero
(France) Sueva Torribio

	0–1	11:10 – Broad (Rioux, Berndsen)
	0–2	14:29 – Aldabergenova (Ashimova, Tursynova) (PP)
	0–3	20:15 – Tursynova (Aldabergenova, Ashimova)
	0–4	25:01 – Broad (Rioux, Berndsen)
	0–5	25:50 – Aldabergenova (McLean, Ashimova)
Choi J. (Kim S., Kim T.) – 59:47	1–5

6 min
Penalties
6 min
23
Shots
23

9 April 2022; 16:30	Italy	3–6 (0–3, 2–1, 1–2)	China	Janów Arena, Janów-Nikiszowiec; Attendance: 129

Game reference

Elisa Biondi
Martina Fedel
Goalies
Tia Chan
Referee:
(Czech Republic) Gabriela Malá
Linesmen:
(Slovenia) Ines Confidenti
(Poland) Natalia Suchanek

	0–1	03:14 – Llanes (Miller, Wong)
	0–2	09:32 – Miller (Lum)
	0–3	14:06 – Miller (PS)
Caumo (Roccella) (PP) – 30:37	1–3
	1–4	33:01 – Wong (Miller)
Bettarini (Niccolai, Caumo) – 36:16	2–4
Roccella – 48:05	3–4
	3–5	55:14 – Llanes (Wong)
	3–6	58:58 – Wong (Yu) (EN)

6 min
Penalties
16 min
26
Shots
39

9 April 2022; 20:00	Poland	4–0 (0–0, 2–0, 2–0)	Slovenia	Janów Arena, Janów-Nikiszowiec; Attendance: 729

Game reference

Martyna Sass
Goalies
Pia Dukarič
Referee:
(Canada) Marie-Ève Couture
Linesmen:
(United Kingdom) Faye Andrews
(Switzerland) Michele Müller

Sikorska (Łąpieś, Wieczorek) – 30:26	1–0
Czarnecka (Zielińska, Późniewska) – 30:50	2–0
Talanda (Sikorska) – 42:44	3–0
Dziwok (Strzelecka) – 57:22	4–0

6 min
Penalties
6 min
57
Shots
20

11 April 2022; 13:00	Slovenia	2–14 (1–2, 1–9, 0–3)	China	Janów Arena, Janów-Nikiszowiec; Attendance: 30

Game reference

Pia Dukarič
Nuša Dovžan
Goalies
Tia Chan
Wang Yuqing
Referee:
(Sweden) Ida Henriksson
Linesmen:
(United Kingdom) Faye Andrews
(France) Sueva Torribio

Confidenti (Blazinšek) – 05:01	1–0
	1–1	11:50 – Woo (Kolstad) (PP)
	1–2	19:32 – Llanes (Lum)
	1–3	21:45 – Woo
	1–4	24:22 – Miller (Lum, Llanes)
	1–5	27:31 – Betinol (Lum)
	1–6	28:59 – Woo (Liu, Yu)
	1–7	32:23 – Llanes (Miller, Lum)
	1–8	33:05 – Segedi (Woo) (PP)
	1–9	33:36 – Miller (Woo)
	1–10	34:24 – Betinol (Zhang, Kolstad)
	1–11	35:56 – Kolstad (Zhao) (PP)
Nylaander (E. Dukarič) – 37:23	2–11
	2–12	42:31 – Llanes (Miler)
	2–13	45:40 – Zhang (Liu)
	2–14	49:51 – Lum (Miller, Llanes)

8 min
Penalties
2 min
7
Shots
67

11 April 2022; 16:30	Italy	1–0 (0–0, 1–0, 0–0)	Kazakhstan	Janów Arena, Janów-Nikiszowiec; Attendance: 89

Game reference
Martina Fedel	Goalies	Darya Dmitrieva	Referee: (Czech Republic) Gabriela Malá; Linesmen: (Switzerland) Michele Müller (Poland) Natalia Suchanek
Stocker (Gius) (PP) – 35:09 / 1–0			Referee: (Czech Republic) Gabriela Malá; Linesmen: (Switzerland) Michele Müller (Poland) Natalia Suchanek
20 min	Penalties	12 min	Referee: (Czech Republic) Gabriela Malá; Linesmen: (Switzerland) Michele Müller (Poland) Natalia Suchanek
17	Shots	26	Referee: (Czech Republic) Gabriela Malá; Linesmen: (Switzerland) Michele Müller (Poland) Natalia Suchanek

11 April 2022; 20:00	South Korea	1–2 (1–1, 0–1, 0–0)	Poland	Janów Arena, Janów-Nikiszowiec; Attendance: 606

Game reference

Cheon Hyo-seo
Goalies
Martyna Sass
Referee:
(United States) Laura White
Linesmen:
(Spain) Alba Calero
(Slovenia) Ines Confidenti

	0–1	01:51 – Sikorska (Onyshchenko, Korkuz)
Park Jo. (Choi J., Park Ji-yoo.) – 09:41	1–1
	1–2	35:14 – Późniewska (Łaskawska)

6 min
Penalties
4 min
23
Shots
35

12 April 2022; 13:00	China	6–2 (3–1, 1–1, 2–0)	Kazakhstan	Janów Arena, Janów-Nikiszowiec; Attendance: 22

Game reference

Tia Chan
Goalies
Darya Dmitrieva
Arina Shyokolova
Referee:
(United States) Laura White
Linesmen:
(United Kingdom) Faye Andrews
(Poland) Natalia Suchanek

	0–1	02:26 – Olzhabayeva (Sviridova, Moldabay)
Lum (Llanes) – 05:11	1–1
Woo (Liu, Zhu) – 12:34	2–1
Kolstad (Lum) – 16:01	3–1
	3–2	36:15 – Berndsen (McLean, Broad) (PP)
Betinol (Zhu, Segedi) – 38:36	4–2
Zhang (Zhu, Wong) – 46:01	5–2
Lum (Llanes) – 59:12	6–2

4 min
Penalties
0 min
43
Shots
23

12 April 2022; 16:30	South Korea	2–1 (1–0, 1–1, 0–0)	Slovenia	Janów Arena, Janów-Nikiszowiec; Attendance: 75

Game reference

Cheon Hyo-seo
Goalies
Pia Dukarič
Referee:
(Canada) Marie-Ève Couture
Linesmen:
(Spain) Alba Calero
(Switzerland) Michele Müller

Kim S. (Park Ji-yoo., Choi J.) – 16:52	1–0
Park Jo. (Park Ji-yoo.) – 31:40	2–0
	2–1	39:54 – Confidenti (Pren)

0 min
Penalties
6 min
46
Shots
12

12 April 2022; 20:00	Poland	5–4 OT (1–0, 1–1, 0–0) (OT: 1–0)	Italy	Janów Arena, Janów-Nikiszowiec; Attendance: 597

Game reference

Martyna Sass
Goalies
Martina Fedel
Referee:
(Sweden) Ida Henriksson
Linesmen:
(Slovenia) Ines Confidenti
(France) Sueva Torribio

	0–1	19:10 – Roccella (Caumo, Niccolai)
Późniewska (Czarnecka) – 20:21	1–1
	1–2	28:43 – Furlani (Mattivi) (EA)
Wieczorek (Gogoc, Sfora) – 39:06	2–2
	2–3	48:11 – Abatangelo (Mazzocchi)
Korkuz (Łąpieś, Onyshchenko) – 51:04	3–3
Sfora (Późniewska, Czarnecka) – 53:02	4–3
	4–4	53:21 – Mattivi (Roccella)
Gogoc (Późniewska) (PP) – 63:32	5–4

6 min
Penalties
12 min
33
Shots
38

14 April 2022; 13:00	Italy	2–1 (1–0, 0–0, 1–1)	South Korea	Janów Arena, Janów-Nikiszowiec; Attendance: 40

Game reference

Martina Fedel
Goalies
Cheon Hyo-seo
Referee:
(United States) Laura White
Linesmen:
(Slovenia) Ines Confidenti
(Poland) Natalia Suchanek

Furlani (Bettarini, Da Rech) – 13:56	1–0
Niccolai (Bonafini, Roccella) – 55:41	2–0
	2–1	59:34 – Lee E. (Jung, Park Ji-yoo.) (EA)

4 min
Penalties
2 min
15
Shots
16

14 April 2022; 16:30	Kazakhstan	2–0 (1–0, 1–0, 0–0)	Slovenia	Janów Arena, Janów-Nikiszowiec; Attendance: 30

Game reference
Arina Shyokolova	Goalies	Pia Dukarič	Referee: (Sweden) Ida Henriksson; Linesmen: (United Kingdom) Faye Andrews (Spain) Alba Calero
Berndsen (Rioux) – 16:53 / 1–0; Ashimova (Aldabergenova, Konysheva) – 38:33 / 2–0			Referee: (Sweden) Ida Henriksson; Linesmen: (United Kingdom) Faye Andrews (Spain) Alba Calero
2 min	Penalties	0 min	Referee: (Sweden) Ida Henriksson; Linesmen: (United Kingdom) Faye Andrews (Spain) Alba Calero
58	Shots	18	Referee: (Sweden) Ida Henriksson; Linesmen: (United Kingdom) Faye Andrews (Spain) Alba Calero

14 April 2022; 20:00	Poland	2–7 (0–6, 2–0, 0–1)	China	Janów Arena, Janów-Nikiszowiec; Attendance: 729

Game reference

Martyna Sass
Goalies
Chen Tiya
Referee:
(Canada) Marie-Ève Couture
Linesmen:
(Switzerland) Michele Müller
(France) Sueva Torribio

	0–1	00:38 – Lum (Liu)
	0–2	01:55 – Lum (Yu, Llanes)
	0–3	05:12 – Liu (Wong, Lum
	0–4	07:02 – Miller (Llanes, Liu)
	0–5	12:51 – Segedi (Liu)
	0–6	19:17 – Llanes (Mi)
Onyshchenko (Chrapek, Późniewska) (PP) – 25:25	1–6
Chrapek (Czarnecka, Zielińska) (PP2) – 30:02	2–6
	2–7	51:27 – Yu (Liu, Zhang) (PP)

6 min
Penalties
10 min
23
Shots
52

=== Statistics ===
==== Scoring leaders ====
List shows the top skaters sorted by points, then goals.

Player	GP	G	A	Pts	+/−	PIM	POS
(China) Rachel Llanes	5	7	8	15	+17	4	F
(China) Leah Lum	5	7	8	15	+20	0	F
(China) Hannah Miller	5	6	6	12	+19	2	F
(China) Liu Zhixin	5	2	9	11	+16	2	D
(China) Anna Segedi	5	5	3	8	+5	0	F
(Poland) Karolina Późniewska	5	3	5	8	−2	4	F
(China) Maddie Woo	5	4	2	6	+2	4	F
(Slovenia) Sara Confidenti	5	4	1	5	−6	0	F
(Italy) Rebecca Roccella	5	2	3	5	−2	4	F
(China) Zhu Rui	5	1	4	5	+4	2	F

GP = Games played; G = Goals; A = Assists; Pts = Points; +/− = Plus/minus; PIM = Penalties in minutes; POS = Position
Source: IIHF.com

==== Goaltending leaders ====
Only the top five goaltenders, based on save percentage, who have played at least 40% of their team's minutes, are included in this list.

Player	TOI	GA	GAA	SA	Sv%	SO
(Slovenia) Pia Dukarič	272:57	18	3.96	259	93.05	0
(Kazakhstan) Darya Dmitrieva	154:13	5	1.95	67	92.54	0
(Poland) Martyna Sass	303:32	13	2.57	155	91.61	1
(Kazakhstan) Arina Shyokolova	145:47	6	2.47	66	90.91	1
(China) Tia Chan	280:00	9	1.93	91	90.11	1

TOI = time on ice (minutes:seconds); SA = shots against; GA = goals against; GAA = goals against average; Sv% = save percentage; SO = shutouts
Source: IIHF.com

=== Awards ===
Position	Player
Goaltender	(Poland) Martyna Sass
Defenceman	(Italy) Nadia Mattivi
Forward	(China) Hannah Miller
