= Camryn Wong =

Canadian ice skater (b. 2000)

- Born: 5 September 2000 (age 26) Vancouver, British Columbia, Canada
- Height: 5 ft 4 in (163 cm)
- Position: Defence
- Shoots: Right
- SDHL team Former teams: Luleå HF/MSSK; UConn Huskies; KRS Vanke Rays
- National team: China
- Playing career: 2018–present

Huang Huier
- Traditional Chinese: 黃慧兒
- Simplified Chinese: 黄慧儿
Transcriptions
Standard Mandarin
- Hanyu Pinyin: Huáng Huì'er
Yue: Cantonese
- Yale Romanization: Wòhng Waih'yìh

Camryn Elise Wong (born 5 September 2000), also known by the Chinese name Huang Huier, is a Canadian ice hockey player. She has played in the Swedish Women's Hockey League (SDHL) with Luleå HF/MSSK since December 2024. Her college ice hockey career was played with the UConn Huskies women's ice hockey program in the Hockey East (HEA) conference of the NCAA Division I.

Wong was a member of the Chinese national ice hockey team that participated in the women's ice hockey tournament at the 2022 Winter Olympics in Beijing and at the 2022 IIHF Women's World Championship Division I Group B.

== Career statistics ==
=== Regular season and playoffs ===
			Regular season					Playoffs
Season	Team	League	GP	G	A	Pts	PIM	GP	G	A	Pts	PIM
2016–17	Pacific Steelers	JWHL	13	2	8	10	0	–	–	–	–	—
2017–18	Pacific Steelers	JWHL	27	9	17	26	18	–	–	–	–	—
2018–19	UConn Huskies	HEA	36	2	3	5	18	–	–	–	–	—
2019–20	UConn Huskies	HEA	39	1	5	6	8	–	–	–	–	—
2020–21	UConn Huskies	HEA	20	2	4	6	4	–	–	–	–	—
2021–22	KRS Vanke Rays	ZhHL	22	1	2	3	18	–	–	–	–	—
2022–23	UConn Huskies	HEA	35	4	7	11	21	–	–	–	–	—
NCAA totals			125	9	19	28	51	–	–	–	–	–

=== International ===
Year	Team	Event	Result	GP	G	A	Pts	PIM
2022	China	OG	9th	4	0	0	0	2
2022	China	WC D1B	1st	5	0	4	4	10
				9	0	4	4	12

== Awards and honours ==
Award	Year or Period
UConn Huskies
Hockey East Rookie of the Week	Week of 1 October 2018
Hockey East All-Conference First Team	2023–24
