= 2015 World Ice Hockey Championships =

2015 World Ice Hockey Championships may refer to:

- 2015 Men's World Ice Hockey Championships
- 2015 Women's World Ice Hockey Championships
- 2015 World Junior Ice Hockey Championships
- 2015 IIHF World U18 Championships
