= Anna Fairman =

American ice hockey player (born 2000)

- Born: October 13, 2000 (age 26) Troy, Michigan, United States
- Height: 5 ft 7 in (170 cm)
- Position: Defense
- Shoots: Right
- NCAA team Former teams: LIU Sharks; KRS Vanke Rays; Robert Morris Colonials
- National team: China
- Playing career: 2019–present

Fei Anna
- Traditional Chinese: 費安娜
- Simplified Chinese: 费安娜
Transcriptions
Standard Mandarin
- Hanyu Pinyin: Fèi Ānnà
Yue: Cantonese
- Yale Romanization: Fai Ōnnóh

Anna Fairman (born October 13, 2000), also known by the Chinese name Fei Anna (Chinese: 费 安娜; pinyin: Fèi Ānnà), is an American ice hockey defenceman, currently playing professionally with Aisulu Almaty of the European Women’s Hockey League. Previously member of the LIU Sharks women's ice hockey program in the New England Women's Hockey Alliance (NEWHA) conference of the NCAA Division I.

As a member of the Chinese women's national ice hockey team, she competed in the women's ice hockey tournament at the 2022 Winter Olympics in Beijing.

== Playing career ==
Fairman was a three-time state champion in Michigan and won two silver medals while competing in the under-19 US nationals in 2018 and 2019. She began her college ice hockey career with the Robert Morris Colonials women's ice hockey program of Robert Morris University in 2019.

She started playing professional ice hockey in 2021, joining KRS Vanke Rays. She was a member of the Chinese team at the 2022 Winter Olympics. She went viral on TikTok during the Olympic games for posting videos documenting her time in the Olympic village.

Ahead of the 2022–23 season, she transferred to Long Island University and joined the LIU Sharks women's ice hockey program.

She is currently a member of the Aisulu Almaty team playing in the European Women’s Hockey League (EWHL)
