= Austria women's national ice hockey team =

Austria
- Nickname: The Lady Eagles
- Association: Österreichischer Eishockeyverband
- General manager: Gina Kingsbury
- Head coach: Alexander Bröms
- Assistants: Sarah Hodges; Rachel Flanagan
- Captain: Anna Meixner
- Most games: Esther Väärälä (141)
- Top scorer: Denise Altmann (100)
- Most points: Denise Altmann (199)
- IIHF code: AUT

Ranking
- Current IIHF: 13 (3 June 2026)
- Highest IIHF: 10 (first in 2017)
- Lowest IIHF: 26 (2004)

First international
- Hungary 4–1 Austria; Villach, Austria; 31 March 2001

Biggest win
- Austria 14–0 Romania; Graz, Austria; 19 March 2004

Biggest defeat
- United States 11–1 Austria; Esbjerg, Denmark; 9 November 2026

World Championship
- Appearances: 18 (first in 2009)
- Best result: 10th (2015, 2017)

International record (W–L–T)
- 116–141–3

The Austrian national women's ice hockey team (German: Österreichische Eishockeynationalmannschaft der Frauen) represents Austria at the International Ice Hockey Federation (IIHF) Women's World Championship and other international tournaments. The team is controlled by the Österreichischer Eishockeyverband. Austria had 644 female players in 2011 and 624 female players in 2025.

== Tournament record ==
=== Olympic Games ===
The women's team of Austria has never qualified for an Olympic tournament.

=== World Championship ===
The Austrian team participated in the World championship for the first time in 2004 (in Division III). That same year, Austria was promoted to Division II. They remained there until their promotion to Division I further to the world championship 2008. Their best performance was 10th place at the World championship of 2015

| Year | Finish | Div rank |
|---|---|---|
| 2004 | Finished in 22nd place | 1st in Division III and promoted to Division II |
| 2005 | Finished in 19th place | 5th in Division II |
| 2007 | Finished in 19th place | 4th in Division II |
| 2008 | Finished in 16th place | 1st in division II and promoted to Division I |
| 2009 | Finished in 13th place | 4th in Division I |
| 2011 | Finished in 12th place | 4th in Division I |
| 2012 | Finished in 12th place | 4th in Division IA |
| 2013 | Finished in 12th place | 4th in Division IA |
| 2014 | Finished in 13th place | 5th in Division IA |
| 2015 | Finished in 10th place | 2nd in Division IA |
| 2016 | Finished in 11th place | 3rd in Division IA |
| 2017 | Finished in 10th place | 2nd in Division IA |
| 2018 | Finished in 11th place | 2nd in Division IA |
| 2019 | Finished in 14th place | 4th in Division IA |
| 2020 | Cancelled due to the COVID-19 pandemic | |
| 2021 | Cancelled due to the COVID-19 pandemic | |
| 2022 | Finished in 14th place | 4th in Division IA |
| 2023 | Finished in 13th place | 3rd in Division IA |
| 2024 | Finished in 14th place | 4th in Division IA |
| 2025 | Finished in 11th place | 1st in Division IA and promoted to Top Division |
| 2026 | Finished in 9h place | |

== Team ==
=== Current roster ===
Roster for the 2026 IIHF Women's World Championship

Head coach: Alexander Bröms

| No. | Pos. | Name | Height | Weight | Birthdate | Team |
|---|---|---|---|---|---|---|
| 4 | F | Marja Linzbichler | 1.66 m (5 ft 5 in) | 56 kg (123 lb) | 28 May 2004 (age 22) | (United States) Norwich Cadets |
| 6 | F | Emma Lintner | 1.81 m (5 ft 11 in) | 70 kg (150 lb) | 15 December 2008 (age 17) | (Switzerland) EV Zug |
| 7 | F | Theresa Schafzahl | 1.71 m (5 ft 7 in) | 63 kg (139 lb) | 12 April 2000 (age 26) | (United States) Boston Fleet |
| 11 | F | Emma Hofbauer | 1.58 m (5 ft 2 in) | 60 kg (130 lb) | 30 November 2004 (age 21) | (United States) Providence Friars |
| 12 | D | Annika Fazokas | 1.67 m (5 ft 6 in) | 59 kg (130 lb) | 6 April 1997 (age 29) | (Switzerland) EV Zug |
| 13 | F | Tamara Grascher – A | 1.68 m (5 ft 6 in) | 62 kg (137 lb) | 13 June 1994 (age 32) | (Austria) Graz99ers Huskies |
| 14 | D | Anna Billa | 1.65 m (5 ft 5 in) | 65 kg (143 lb) | 21 June 2006 (age 20) | (United States) Holy Cross Crusaders |
| 15 | D | Emma Mörtl | 1.72 m (5 ft 8 in) | 61 kg (134 lb) | 22 November 2003 (age 22) | (Austria) Sabres St. Pölten |
| 16 | F | Eva Beiter | 1.63 m (5 ft 4 in) | 55 kg (121 lb) | 26 December 1988 (age 37) | (Austria) EHC Lustenau |
| 19 | F | Amelie Suppan | 1.65 m (5 ft 5 in) | 57 kg (126 lb) | 8 January 2009 (age 17) | (Austria) Sabres St. Pölten |
| 21 | F | Lena Dauböck | 1.65 m (5 ft 5 in) | 59 kg (130 lb) | 5 June 2003 (age 23) | (Austria) KSV Highlanders |
| 22 | D | Artemis Tekin | 1.64 m (5 ft 5 in) | 60 kg (130 lb) | 3 May 2008 (age 18) | (Austria) Sabres St. Pölten |
| 23 | D | Antonia Matzka – A | 1.73 m (5 ft 8 in) | 70 kg (150 lb) | 16 February 1999 (age 27) | (Austria) Sabres St. Pölten |
| 24 | F | Anja Trummer | 1.72 m (5 ft 8 in) | 63 kg (139 lb) | 24 July 2001 (age 25) | (Switzerland) ZSC Lions |
| 25 | G | Selma Luggin | 1.78 m (5 ft 10 in) | 67 kg (148 lb) | 5 October 2002 (age 24) | (Austria) Sabres St. Pölten |
| 26 | F | Leonie Kutzer | 1.61 m (5 ft 3 in) | 53 kg (117 lb) | 26 March 2005 (age 21) | (Switzerland) EV Zug |
| 28 | F | Hanna Obermayr | 1.67 m (5 ft 6 in) | 60 kg (130 lb) | 13 July 2004 (age 22) | (Austria) Sabres St. Pölten |
| 29 | D | Lisa Schröfl | 1.65 m (5 ft 5 in) | 60 kg (130 lb) | 3 January 2004 (age 22) | (Austria) KSV Highlanders |
| 31 | G | Magdalena Luggin | 1.75 m (5 ft 9 in) | 58 kg (128 lb) | 6 November 2005 (age 21) | (United States) Mercyhurst Lakers |
| 40 | F | Emma Pfeffer | 1.65 m (5 ft 5 in) | 52 kg (115 lb) | 11 September 2004 (age 22) | (United States) Merrimack Warriors |
| 55 | D | Laura Nagy | 1.74 m (5 ft 9 in) | 74 kg (163 lb) | 2 October 2006 (age 20) | (United States) LIU Sharks |
| 81 | G | Anja Adamitsch | 1.65 m (5 ft 5 in) | 53 kg (117 lb) | 16 October 2001 (age 25) | (Austria) KSV Highlanders |
| 88 | F | Vanessa Picka | 1.65 m (5 ft 5 in) | 60 kg (130 lb) | 3 July 2008 (age 18) | (Sweden) Leksands IF |
| 93 | D | Charlotte Wittich | 1.71 m (5 ft 7 in) | 70 kg (150 lb) | 23 July 1993 (age 33) | (Austria) Sabres St. Pölten |
| 94 | F | Anna Meixner – C | 1.61 m (5 ft 3 in) | 64 kg (141 lb) | 16 June 1994 (age 32) | (Sweden) Brynäs IF |

== Awards and honors ==
- Charlotte Wittich, Directorate Award, Best Defender, 2019 IIHF Women's World Championship Division I
