= Anna Segedi =

American ice hockey player (born 2000)

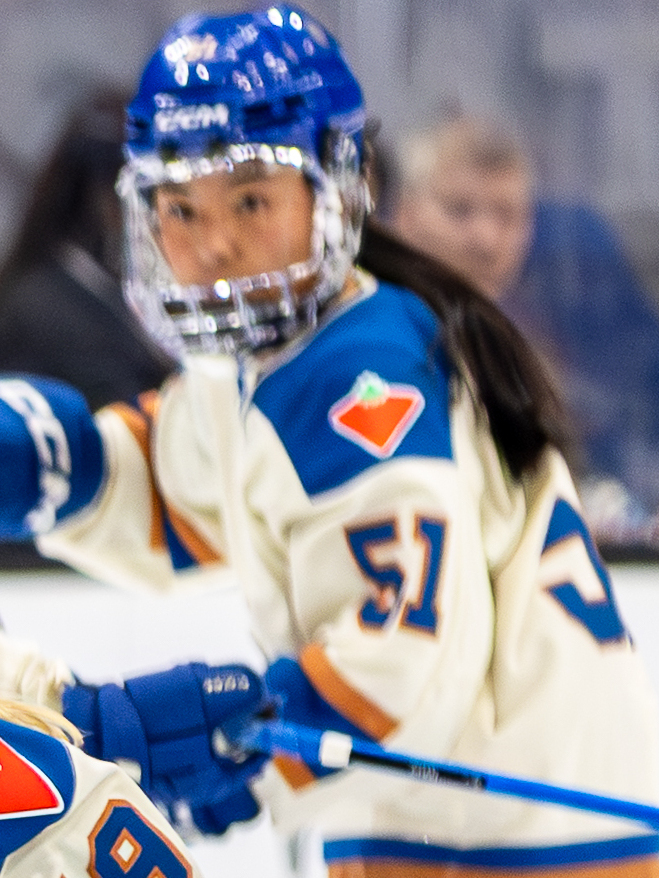
- Segedi with the Vancouver Goldeneyes in 2026
- Born: December 20, 2000 (age 25) Commerce Township, Michigan
- Height: 5 ft 5 in (165 cm)
- Weight: 63 kg (139 lb; 9 st 13 lb)
- Position: Center
- Shoots: Left
- PWHL team Former teams: Vancouver Goldeneyes; KRS Vanke Rays
- National team: China
- Playing career: 2019–present

Zhang Xifang
- Traditional Chinese: 張喜芳
- Simplified Chinese: 张喜芳
Transcriptions
Standard Mandarin
- Hanyu Pinyin: Zhāng Xǐfāng

Anna Segedi (born December 20, 2000), also known by the Chinese name Zhang Xifang (Chinese: 张喜芳), is an American professional ice hockey player for the Vancouver Goldeneyes of the Professional Women's Hockey League (PWHL). She played college ice hockey at St. Lawrence.

Segedi was a member of the Chinese national team that played in the women's ice hockey tournament at the 2022 Winter Olympics and at Division 1 tournaments of the IIHF Women's World Championship in 2022 and 2023.

== Early life ==
Born in China, Segedi grew up in Commerce Township, Michigan, a western suburb of Metro Detroit in the United States. She played minor ice hockey in the Tier 1 Elite B Hockey League (T1EBHL) with Detroit-based Honeybaked 14U from 2012 to 2014 and in the T1EHL 16U league with Belle Tire Girls Minor Midget in the 2014–15 season, ranking third in the league for scoring and leading the team to the 16U national title. Her junior career was played with Belle Tire Girls 19U in the T1EHL 19U and USA Hockey Girls Tier I 19U, with whom she won the national championship title in 2017, a national championship silver medal in 2018, a national championship bronze medal in 2019, and claimed three consecutive Michigan state titles.

== Playing career ==
=== College ===
Segedi joined the St. Lawrence Saints women's ice hockey program in the ECAC Hockey conference of the NCAA Division I as a freshman in the 2019–20 season. She found success in her first month of NCAA play, scoring six goals and five assists – including a hat-trick against New Hampshire – and was named the Women's Player of the Week for October 7, 2019, and the Women's Rookie of the Month for October 2019 by ECAC Hockey. She concluded her rookie season ranked second of all St. Lawrence skaters in scoring, with 11 goals and 12 assists for 23 points in 36 games.

Her sophomore season continued to build on her success and saw Segedi lead the team in scoring, with four goals and eight assists for 12 points in 13 games of the COVID-19 shorted season. She was named the February 2021 Army ROTC Player of the Month by ECAC Hockey after averaging more than a point per game across the month and recording three multi-point performances.

=== ZhHL ===
Presented with the opportunity to try out for the Chinese women's national ice hockey team at the 2022 Winter Olympics, Segedi paused her college ice hockey career and signed to play professionally in the Zhenskaya Hockey League (ZhHL) with the KRS Vanke Rays in the summer of 2021. The team's roster for 2021–22 comprised only players eligible to represent China at the upcoming Olympics, giving head coach Brian Idalski extensive time to assess individual play before building the national team. Segedi made a convincing case for her place on the national team, scoring a hat-trick against 7.62 Voskresensk and ranking third on the team for goals (fourth for points). She was named the ZhHL Rookie of the Month in September 2021.

=== PWHL ===
Segedi was drafted in the third round, twenty-second overall, by the Minnesota Frost in the 2025 PWHL Draft. On July 29, 2025, she signed a two-year contract with the Frost. She was traded to the Vancouver Goldeneyes for Denisa Křížová on November 19, 2025, prior to her PWHL debut.

== International play ==
As a teen, Segedi participated in several USA Hockey Girls U18 Development Camps.

She was officially named to the Chinese roster for the women's ice hockey tournament at the 2022 Winter Olympics on January 28, 2022.

== Career statistics ==
=== Regular season and playoffs ===
Note: GP = Games played; G = Goals; A = Assists; Pts = Points; PIM = Penalty minutes;

			Regular season					Playoffs
Season	Team	League	GP	G	A	Pts	PIM	GP	G	A	Pts	PIM
2019–20	St. Lawrence University	ECAC	36	11	12	23	20	—	—	—	—	—
2020–21	St. Lawrence University	ECAC	13	4	8	12	2	—	—	—	—	—
2021–22	KRS Vanke Rays	ZhHL	20	7	6	13	18	—	—	—	—	—
2022–23	St. Lawrence University	ECAC	37	11	10	21	26	—	—	—	—	—
2023–24	St. Lawrence University	ECAC	39	18	21	39	14	—	—	—	—	—
2024–25	St. Lawrence University	ECAC	39	10	14	24	14	—	—	—	—	—
2025–26	Vancouver Goldeneyes	PWHL	27	1	1	2	2	—	—	—	—	—
ZhHL totals			20	7	6	13	18	—	—	—	—	—
PWHL totals			27	1	1	2	2	—	—	—	—	—

=== International ===
Note: GP = Games played; G = Goals; A = Assists; Pts = Points; PIM = Penalty minutes;

				Regular season
Year	Team	Event	Result	GP	G	A	Pts	PIM
2022	China	OG	9th	3	0	0	0	2
2022	China	WWC D1B	1st	5	5	3	8	0
2023	China	WWC D1A	1st	5	2	2	4	8
Senior totals				13	7	5	12	10
