= Emma Bergesen =

Norwegian ice hockey player (born 1999)

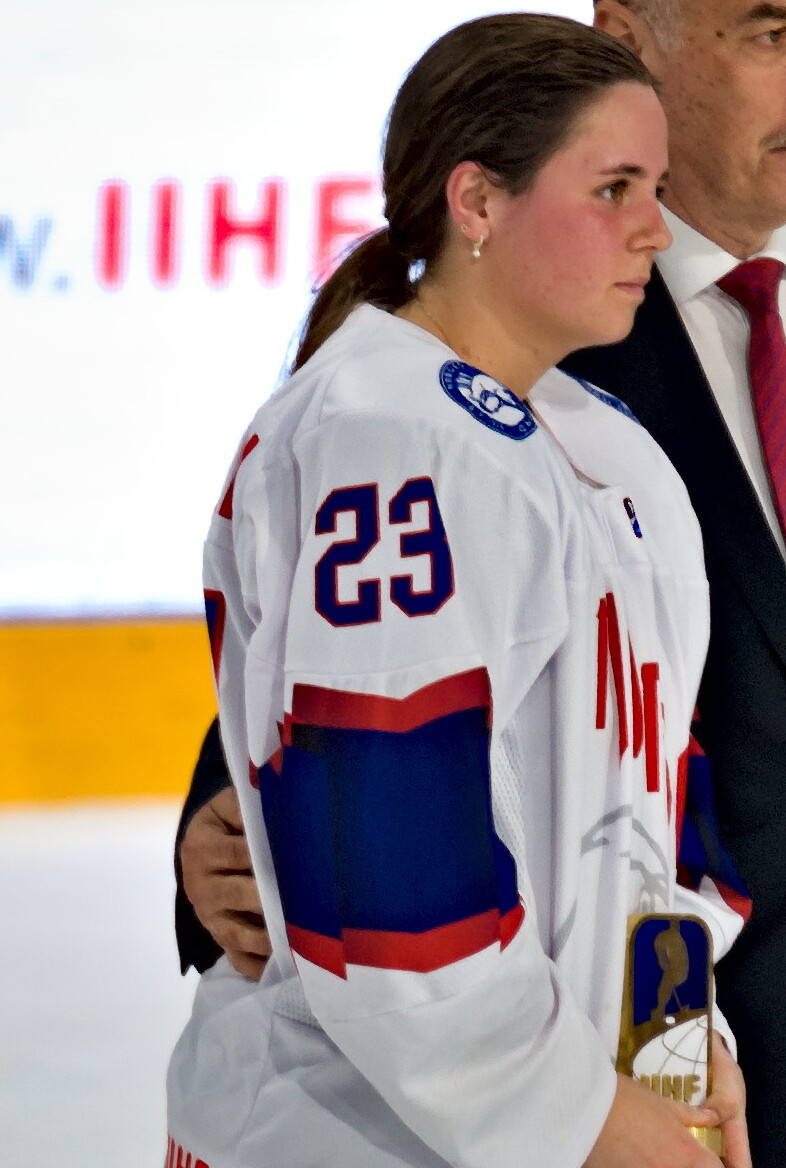
- Bergesen at the 2022 IIHF World Championship
- Born: November 1, 1999 (age 26) Stavanger, Norway
- Height: 5 ft 8 in (173 cm)
- Weight: 143 lb (65 kg; 10 st 3 lb)
- Position: Defence
- Shoots: Left
- PWHL team Former teams: Ottawa Charge; SDE Hockey
- National team: Norway
- Playing career: 2019–present

Emma Aarthun Bergesen (born 1 November 1999) is a Norwegian professional ice hockey defender for the Ottawa Charge of the Professional Women's Hockey League (PWHL) and a member of Norway women's national ice hockey team. She previously played for SDE Hockey of the Swedish Women's Hockey League (SDHL).

== Playing career ==
Bergesen attended Mount Royal University where she played ice hockey for the Cougars. During the 2022–23 season, she recorded five goals and 17 assists in 28 games. During the finals of the 2023 U Sports Women's Ice Hockey Championship against Concordia, she scored the game-winning goal in overtime to help the Cougars win the U Sports women's ice hockey championship, their first championship in program history Following the season she was named the Canada West Defencemen of the Year. During the 2023–24 season, she recorded seven goals and 15 assists in 28 games, and was named a USports All-Canadian First Team honoree, and the Canada West Defencemen of the Year for the second consecutive year.

Following her collegiate career, she joined SDE Hockey of the SDHL. During the 2024–25 season, in her first year as a professional, she recorded three goals and 16 assists in 33 games. On 21 June 2025, Bergesen signed a one-year contract with the Ottawa Charge. She became the first Norwegian player to sign in the PWHL.

== International play ==
Bergesen represented Norway at three IIHF U18 Women's World Championship. She has represented Norway at several IIHF Women's World Championships. During the 2024 IIHF Women's World Championship Division I, she led her team in scoring with one goal and four assists in five games to win gold. Norway was subsequently promoted to the top division for the first time since 1997.

== Career statistics ==
=== Regular season and playoffs ===
| | | | Regular season | | | | | Playoffs |
| Season | Team | League | GP | G | A | Pts | PIM | GP | G | A | Pts | PIM |
|---|---|---|---|---|---|---|---|---|---|---|---|---|
| 2019–20 | Mount Royal University | U Sports | 25 | 4 | 6 | 10 | 6 | 7 | 0 | 0 | 0 | 2 |
| 2021–22 | Mount Royal University | U Sports | 18 | 2 | 8 | 10 | 6 | 2 | 0 | 0 | 0 | 0 |
| 2022–23 | Mount Royal University | U Sports | 28 | 5 | 17 | 22 | 24 | 9 | 0 | 2 | 2 | 6 |
| 2023–24 | Mount Royal University | U Sports | 28 | 7 | 15 | 22 | 8 | 5 | 1 | 4 | 5 | 2 |
| 2024–25 | SDE Hockey | SDHL | 33 | 3 | 16 | 19 | 4 | 8 | 1 | 1 | 2 | 2 |
| SDHL totals | | | 33 | 3 | 16 | 19 | 4 | 8 | 1 | 1 | 2 | 2 |

=== International ===
| Year | Team | Event | Result | GP | G | A | Pts | PIM |
|---|---|---|---|---|---|---|---|---|
| 2015 | Norway | U18-D1 | 10th | 5 | 0 | 0 | 0 | 0 |
| 2016 | Norway | U18-D1 | 12th | 5 | 0 | 2 | 2 | 0 |
| 2017 | Norway | U18-D1 | 11th | 5 | 1 | 5 | 6 | 2 |
| 2017 | Norway | WC-D1A | 11th | 5 | 0 | 0 | 0 | 2 |
| 2017 | Norway | OGQ | DNQ | 6 | 1 | 0 | 1 | 0 |
| 2018 | Norway | WC-D1A | 14th | 5 | 0 | 0 | 0 | 0 |
| 2019 | Norway | WC-D1A | 13th | 5 | 0 | 1 | 1 | 2 |
| 2021 | Norway | OGQ | DNQ | 3 | 0 | 0 | 0 | 0 |
| 2022 | Norway | WC-D1A | 12th | 4 | 0 | 5 | 5 | 0 |
| 2023 | Norway | WC-D1A | 15th | 5 | 1 | 1 | 2 | 0 |
| 2024 | Norway | WC-D1A | 11th | 5 | 1 | 4 | 5 | 2 |
| 2025 | Norway | OGQ | DNQ | 3 | 0 | 4 | 4 | 2 |
| 2025 | Norway | WC | 9th | 4 | 1 | 1 | 2 | 0 |
| Junior totals | | | | 15 | 1 | 7 | 8 | 2 |
| Senior totals | | | | 45 | 4 | 16 | 20 | 8 |
