= Tia Chan =

Canadian ice hockey player (born 2002)

- Born: 3 September 2002 (age 24) Hamilton, Ontario, Canada
- Height: 1.67 m (5 ft 6 in)
- Weight: 68 kg (150 lb; 10 st 10 lb)
- Position: Goaltender
- Catches: Right
- PWHL team Former teams: San Jose Sea Lions; UConn Huskies KRS Vanke Rays
- National team: China
- Playing career: 2020–present

Chen Tiya
- Traditional Chinese: 陳提婭
- Simplified Chinese: 陈提娅
Transcriptions
Standard Mandarin
- Hanyu Pinyin: Chén Tíyà
Yue: Cantonese
- Yale Romanization: Chàhn Tàih'a

Tia Chan (born 3 September 2002), also known as Chen Tiya (Chinese: 陈提娅; pinyin: Chén Tíyà), is a Chinese-Canadian ice hockey goaltender drafted to the San Jose Sea Lions of the Professional Women's Hockey League. She played college ice hockey with the UConn Huskies. She has also played in the Zhenskaya Hockey League (ZhHL) with the KRS Vanke Rays. A member of the Chinese national team, Chan represented China at the 2022 Winter Olympics.

She was drafted by the San Jose Sea Lions in the 2026 PWHL Draft.

== Playing career ==
Chan began playing ice hockey at age four, following her two brothers, James and Ryan, onto the ice. She settled into goaltending after her brothers regularly asked her to man the goal so they could practice shooting.

She got her start playing on boys' minor ice hockey teams in the Greater Toronto and Hamilton Area before moving to women's teams at the age of eight. Her junior career was played with the Burlington Junior Barracudas of the Provincial Women's Hockey League (Provincial WHL).

=== College ===
For the 2020–21 season, Chan joined the UConn in the Hockey East (WHEA) conference of the NCAA Division I as an incoming freshman. As a rookie, she started ten games and posted a 1.49 goals against average (GAA) and .947 save percentage (SV%) on the season. Her play was recognized with selection to the Hockey East All-Rookie Team.

During the 2025–26 season, she led Hockey East in minutes played (2252:25), wins (27), shutouts (5), goals against average (1.55), and save percentage (.951) and was second with 1,122 saves. Nationally, she was second in wins, save percentage, and minutes played, third in saves, fourth in goals against average, and eighth in shutouts. Following the season she was named the WHCA Goalie of the Year.

=== Professional ===
In the 2026 PWHL Draft, Chan was selected in the third round, 28th overall, by the San Jose Sea Lions.

== Career statistics ==
=== Regular season and playoffs ===
			Regular season									Playoffs
Season	Team	League	GP	W	L	T	Min	GA	SO	GAA	SV%	GP	W	L	Min	GA	SO	GAA	SV%
2016–17	Burlington Jr. Barracudas	Provincial WHL	1	0	1	0	48:28	3	0	3.09	.850	0	–	–	0:00	–	–	–	–
2017–18	Burlington Jr. Barracudas	Provincial WHL	26	8	10	5	1235:21	44	3	1.78	.939	3	0	2	119:00	6	0	2.52	.932
2018–19	Burlington Jr. Barracudas	Provincial WHL	20	9	10	1	995:07	33	4	1.66	.940	2	0	2	96:58	5	0	2.58	.917
2019–20	Burlington Jr. Barracudas	Provincial WHL	26	14	8	3	1290:03	36	6	1.40	.949	4	3	0	189:48	8	0	2.11	.917
2020–21	UConn Huskies	HEA	10	4	5	1	603:27	15	3	1.49	.947	–	–	–	–	–	–	–	–
2021–22	KRS Vanke Rays	ZhHL	9	6	2	–	545:00	11	3	1.21	.945	–	–	–	–	–	–	–	–
2022–23	UConn Huskies	HEA	27	10	12	4	1583:43	44	6	1.67	.935	–	–	–	–	–	–	–	–
2023–24	UConn Huskies	HEA	23	13	5	4	1405:05	27	8	1.15	.956	–	–	–	–	–	–	–	–
2024–25	UConn Huskies	HEA	15	8	5	2	907:00	26	3	1.72	.940	–	–	–	–	–	–	–	–
2025–26	UConn Huskies	HEA	24	18	6	0	1464:30	38	4	1.56	.948	–	–	–	–	–	–	–	–
Provincial WHL totals			73	31	29	9	3567:59	116	13	1.63	.942	9	3	4	404:06	19	0	2.35	.922

=== International ===
Year	Team	Event	Result	GPI	W	L	MIN	GA	SO	GAA	SV%
2022	China	OG	9th	1	0	1	60:00	3	0	3.00	.917
2022	China	WC D1B	1st	5	5	0	280:00	9	1	1.93	.901
2023	China	WC D1A	1st	5	5	0	300:00	6	2	1.20	.958
				11	10	1	640:00	18	3

== Awards and honours ==
Award	Year
College
Hockey East All-Rookie Team	2020–21
Hockey East All-Conference Third Team	2022–23
HCA National Goalie of the Year semifinalist	2022–23
Hockey East All-Conference Second Team	2023–24
National Goalie of the Year	2025–26
