= Leah Lum =

Canadian ice hockey player (born 1996)

- Born: May 12, 1996 (age 30) Richmond, British Columbia, Canada
- Height: 5 ft 4 in (163 cm)
- Weight: 145 lb (66 kg; 10 st 5 lb)
- Position: Forward
- Shoots: Left
- Played for: Montreal Victoire; Toronto Six; KRS Vanke Rays; UConn Huskies
- National team: China
- Playing career: 2014–present

Lin Qiqi
- Traditional Chinese: 林綺琪
- Simplified Chinese: 林绮琪
Transcriptions
Standard Mandarin
- Hanyu Pinyin: Lín Qǐqí
Yue: Cantonese
- Yale Romanization: Làhm Yíkèih

Leah Lum (born May 12, 1996), also known by the Chinese name Lin Qiqi (Chinese: 林绮琪), is a professional Canadian-born Chinese ice hockey forward. She most recently played during the 2023–24 season with the Montreal Victoire of the Professional Women's Hockey League (PWHL).

Lum represented China in the women's ice hockey tournament at the 2022 Winter Olympics in Beijing and at the 2022 IIHF Women's World Championship Division I Group B, where she tied teammate Rachel Llanes (Lin Ni) for most goals (7) and most points (15) scored in the tournament.

== Playing career ==
Lum scored 102 points in 148 games with the UConn Huskies women's ice hockey program in the Hockey East (WHEA) conference of the NCAA Division I. In her last year with the Huskies, she served as alternate captain.

After graduating, Lum signed with the Shenzhen KRS Vanke Rays of the Canadian Women's Hockey League (CWHL), who had drafted her 11th overall in the 2018 CWHL Draft. She stayed with the team as it moved to the Zhenskaya Hockey League (ZhHL) after the collapse of the CWHL in 2019 and was named to the ZhHL All-Star Game in 2020. As of August 2022, she ranks fourth on the Shenzhen KRS all-time record lists for most goals (28), assists (52), points (80), and games played (104).

== Personal life ==
Lum is member of the LGBTQ community.
