= Maddie Woo =

American ice hockey player (born 1994)

- Born: September 24, 1994 (age 32) Plymouth, Minnesota, US
- Height: 172 cm (5 ft 8 in)
- Weight: 69 kg (152 lb; 10 st 12 lb)
- Position: Right wing
- Shoots: Right
- Played for: KRS Vanke Rays; Brown Bears
- National team: China
- Playing career: 2013–present

Hu Baozhen
- Traditional Chinese: 胡寶珍
- Simplified Chinese: 胡宝珍
Transcriptions
Standard Mandarin
- Hanyu Pinyin: Hú Bǎozhēn
Yue: Cantonese
- Yale Romanization: Wùh Bóujān

Madison "Maddie" Woo (born September 24, 1994), also known by her Chinese name Hu Baozhen (胡宝珍; Hú Bǎozhēn), is an American ice hockey player and member of the Chinese national ice hockey team. She played with the KRS Vanke Rays in the Canadian Women's Hockey League (CWHL) from 2017 to 2019 and in the Zhenskaya Hockey League (ZhHL) from 2019 to 2022.

Woo represented China in the women's ice hockey tournament at the 2022 Winter Olympics in Beijing.

== Playing career ==
Woo was born and raised in Plymouth, Minnesota, on the western edge of the Minneapolis suburbs, in the United States. She attended Maple Grove Senior High School and played four years with the Maple Grove Crimson girls' varsity AA team in the Minnesota State High School League (MSHSL). While a high school ice hockey player, she was a two-time All-Conference selection for the Northwest Suburban Conference and was named a Minnesota All-State honorable mention as a senior.

=== NCAA ===
Her college ice hockey career was played with the Brown Bears women's ice hockey program in the ECAC Hockey conference of the NCAA Division I during 2013 to 2017. She played in all 29 games as a freshman, sophomore, and junior and was named captain as a senior before suffering a season-ending injury after appearing in just five games. The team’s leading scorer as a junior in the 2015–16 season, she tallied six goals – including five power play goals – and nine assists for 15 points in 29 games.

=== Professional ===
In 2017, the Canadian Women's Hockey League (CWHL) announced the creation of two new China-based teams, the Vanke Rays and Kunlun Red Star WIH, launched in partnership with the Chinese Ice Hockey Association to improve the state of women’s ice hockey in China ahead of the 2022 Winter Olympics, for which the Chinese national team was guaranteed a berth as the representative team of the host nation. American and Canadian "heritage players" – a designation which, at that time, required a minimum of one Chinese-born grandparent – were sought out by the new teams, as it was possible that they could represent China with the national team in the future.

Woo was recruited as a heritage player and was ultimately selected 48th overall in the 2017 CWHL Draft by Kunlun Red Star WIH. She signed to Kunlun Red Star’s inaugural roster for the 2017–18 CWHL season as one of two heritage players, along with teammate Jessica Wong, and was named one of the team’s "Sport Ambassadors," players selected to mentor their Chinese teammates.

Woo resigned from the team as it merged with the Vanke Rays and became the Shenzhen KRS Vanke Rays ahead of the 2018–19 CWHL season. As in her rookie season, she played all 28 games and scored three goals, though her three assists fell short of the seven she had notched previously.

Following the collapse of the Canadian Women's Hockey League in 2019 and the KRS Vanke Rays' move to the ZhHL, Woo took a step back from hockey to focus on her scientific career. She sporadically played with the team during their first two seasons in the Russian league, appearing in four regular-season games of the 2019–20 season and in the 2021 ZhHL Cup Final.

She fully rejoined the team for the 2021–22 season, tallying five goals and seven assists for 12 points in 21 games before the Olympic break.

== Personal life ==
Woo holds a Bachelor of Science (2017) and a Master of Science (2020) in biomedical engineering from the Center for Biomedical Engineering at the Brown University School of Engineering. Her master's thesis was "Label-free functional imaging of cell viability response to disruptive agents in 3D spheroids using optical coherence tomography."

== Career statistics ==
=== Regular season and playoffs ===
			Regular season					Playoffs
Season	Team	League	GP	G	A	Pts	PIM	GP	G	A	Pts	PIM
2009–10	Maple Grove Crimson	MSHSL	20	4	6	10	8	–	–	–	–	–
2010–11	Maple Grove Crimson	MSHSL	25	11	14	25	2	1	0	0	0	0
2011–12	Maple Grove Crimson	MSHSL	25	9	21	30	10	1	0	0	0	0
2012–13	Maple Grove Crimson	MSHSL	25	19	15	34	34	1	0	0	0	2
2013–14	Brown Bears	NCAA	29	2	1	3	14	–	–	–	–	–
2014–15	Brown Bears	NCAA	29	5	7	12	22	–	–	–	–	–
2015–16	Brown Bears	NCAA	29	6	9	15	34	–	–	–	–	–
2016–17	Brown Bears	NCAA	5	1	3	4	2	–	–	–	–	–
2017–18	Kunlun Red Star WIH	CWHL	28	3	7	10	10	4	0	0	0	4
2018–19	KRS Vanke Rays	CWHL	28	3	3	6	10	–	–	–	–	–
2019–20	KRS Vanke Rays	ZhHL	4	0	0	0	0	–	–	–	–	–
2020–21	KRS Vanke Rays	ZhHL	–	–	–	–	–	3	0	0	0	0
2021–22	KRS Vanke Rays	ZhHL	21	5	7	12	18	–	–	–	–	—
NCAA totals			92	14	20	34	72	–	–	–	–	–
CWHL totals			56	6	10	16	20	4	0	0	0	4
ZhHL totals			25	5	7	12	18	3	0	0	0	0

=== International ===
Year	Team	Event	Result	GP	G	A	Pts	PIM
2022	China	OG	9th	4	1	0	1	2
2022	China	WW D1B	1st	5	4	2	6	4
				9	5	2	7	6
