= Rebecca Roccella =

Italian ice hockey player (born 2001)

- Born: 3 April 2001 (age 25) Turin, Italy
- Height: 1.62 m (5 ft 4 in)
- Weight: 60 kg (132 lb; 9 st 6 lb)
- Position: Forward
- Shoots: Left
- PFWL team Former teams: HC Davos Ladies; Real Torino; Hockey Como; Alleghe Hockey Girls; HC Ambrì-Piotta Girls; HC Ladies Lugano
- National team: Italy
- Playing career: 2014–present

Rebecca Roccella (born 3 April 2001) is an Italian ice hockey player. She is a member of the Italian women's national ice hockey team that participated at the 2026 Winter Olympics.

== Playing career ==
=== International ===
Roccella was Italy's leading scorer at the Group B tournament of the 2022 IIHF Women's World Championship Division I in Katowice, Poland. Italy gained a podium finish at the event, earning bronze.

Making her Olympic debut on 5 February, Italy opposed France, who were making their Olympic debut. Roccella scored the game winning goal as Italy prevailed in a 4-1 final. In the game, she played on a line with Anna Caumo and Kristin Della Rovere.
