= Kassy Betinol =

Canadian ice hockey player (born 2001)

Kas Betinol
- Born: June 14, 2001 (age 25) Okotoks, Alberta, Canada
- Height: 162 cm (5 ft 4 in)
- Weight: 63 kg (139 lb; 9 st 13 lb)
- Position: Forward
- Shoots: Right
- NCAA team Former teams: Colgate Raiders; KRS Vanke Rays; Minnesota Duluth Bulldogs
- National team: China
- Playing career: 2019–present

Kang Mulan
- Traditional Chinese: 康木蘭
- Simplified Chinese: 康木兰
Transcriptions
Standard Mandarin
- Hanyu Pinyin: Kāng Mùlán
Yue: Cantonese
- Yale Romanization: Hōng Muhklàahn or Hōng Muhklāan

Kasundra Primylean "Kassy/Kas" Betinol (born June 14, 2001), also known by the Chinese name Kang Mulan (Chinese: 康木兰; pinyin: Kāng Mùlán), is a Canadian ice hockey player, currently playing in the ECAC Hockey conference of the NCAA Division I with the Colgate Raiders women's ice hockey program. She has played internationally with the Chinese national ice hockey team.

== Playing career ==
Betinol first played college ice hockey with the Minnesota Duluth Bulldogs women's ice hockey program during the 2019–20 and 2020–21 seasons.

Betinol represented China in the women's ice hockey tournament at the 2022 Winter Olympics in Beijing. In preparation for the tournament, she played the 2021–22 season in the Zhenskaya Hockey League (ZhHL) with the KRS Vanke Rays, which was populated exclusively by players eligible to represent China at the 2022 Winter Olympics, and was named ZhHL Rookie of the Month for October 2021.

Ahead of the 2022–23 season, she transferred from the University of Minnesota Duluth to Colgate University and joined the Colgate Raiders women's ice hockey program.

== Career statistics ==
=== Regular season and playoffs ===
			Regular season					Playoffs
Season	Team	League	GP	G	A	Pts	PIM	GP	G	A	Pts	PIM
2019–20	Minnesota Duluth Bulldogs	NCAA	36	2	2	4	2	—	—	—	—	—
2020–21	Minnesota Duluth Bulldogs	NCAA	19	1	2	3	0	—	—	—	—	—
2021–22	KRS Vanke Rays	ZhHL	22	10	11	21	14	—	—	—	—	—
2022–23	Colgate Raiders	NCAA	40	8	7	15	7	—	—	—	—	—
NCAA totals			95	11	11	22	14	—	—	—	—	—

=== International ===
Year	Team	Event	Result	GP	G	A	Pts	PIM
2022	China	OG	9th	4	1	0	1	0
2022	China	WW D1B	1st	5	4	0	4	2
