= 2015 Women's Ice Hockey World Championships =

Tournament details
- Host countries: Sweden; France; China; Great Britain; Spain; Hong Kong
- Venues: 7 (in 6 host cities)
- Teams: 36

Final positions
- Champions: United States (6th title)
- Runners-up: Canada
- Third place: Finland

The 2015 Women's Ice Hockey World Championships were the 18th such series of tournaments organized by the International Ice Hockey Federation. These championships also served as qualifications for the 2016 competition.

== Championship (Top Division) ==
The Top Division tournament was played in Malmö, Sweden, from 28 March to 4 April 2015.

Rank	Team
1st place, gold medalist(s)	United States
2nd place, silver medalist(s)	Canada
3rd place, bronze medalist(s)	Finland
4	Russia
5	Sweden
6	Switzerland
7	Japan
8	Germany

Relegated to the 2016 Division I A

Quarterfinals
A4	Russia	2
B1	Sweden	1
A3	Finland	3
B2	Switzerland	0

Semifinals
A1	United States	13
A4	Russia	1
A2	Canada	3
A3	Finland	0

Final
A1	United States	7
A2	Canada	5
Bronze medal game
A4	Russia	1
A3	Finland	4

== Division I ==
=== Division I Group A ===
The Division I Group A tournament was played in Rouen, France, from 12 to 18 April 2015.

Pos	Team	Pld	W	OTW	OTL	L	GF	GA	GD	Pts	Promotion or relegation
1	Czech Republic	5	5	0	0	0	20	4	+16	15	Promoted to the 2016 Top Division
2	Austria	5	4	0	0	1	25	10	+15	12	
3	France (H)	5	2	0	1	2	17	15	+2	7	
4	Denmark	5	2	0	0	3	12	18	−6	6	
5	Norway	5	1	1	0	3	12	18	−6	5	
6	Latvia	5	0	0	0	5	6	27	−21	0	Relegated to the 2016 Division I B

Source: IIHF
(H) Host

=== Division I Group B ===
The Division I Group B tournament was played in Beijing, China, from 6 to 12 April 2015.

Pos	Team	Pld	W	OTW	OTL	L	GF	GA	GD	Pts	Promotion or relegation
1	Slovakia	5	4	1	0	0	21	8	+13	14	Promoted to the 2016 Division I A
2	Netherlands	5	3	1	0	1	16	6	+10	11	
3	China (H)	5	3	0	1	1	21	15	+6	10	
4	Hungary	5	2	0	0	3	10	12	−2	6	
5	Italy	5	1	0	1	3	11	14	−3	4	
6	North Korea	5	0	0	0	5	6	30	−24	0	Relegated to the 2016 Division II A

Source: IIHF
(H) Host

== Division II ==
=== Division II Group A ===
The Division II Group A tournament was played in Dumfries, Great Britain, from 30 March to 5 April 2015.

Pos	Team	Pld	W	OTW	OTL	L	GF	GA	GD	Pts	Promotion or relegation
1	Kazakhstan	5	5	0	0	0	30	2	+28	15	Promoted to the 2016 Division I B
2	Great Britain (H)	5	4	0	0	1	23	5	+18	12	
3	South Korea	5	2	1	0	2	21	8	+13	8	
4	Poland	5	1	1	1	2	17	17	0	6	
5	Croatia	5	1	0	0	4	9	45	−36	3	
6	New Zealand	5	0	0	1	4	5	28	−23	1	Relegated to the 2016 Division II B

Source: IIHF
(H) Host

=== Division II Group B ===
The Division II Group B tournament was played in Jaca, Spain, from 7 to 13 March 2015.

Pos	Team	Pld	W	OTW	OTL	L	GF	GA	GD	Pts	Promotion or relegation
1	Slovenia	5	4	0	0	1	28	9	+19	12	Promoted to the 2016 Division II A
2	Mexico	5	3	0	1	1	13	7	+6	10	
3	Spain (H)	5	2	1	0	2	15	11	+4	8	
4	Iceland	5	1	1	2	1	13	16	−3	7	
5	Australia	5	2	0	0	3	8	13	−5	6	
6	Belgium	5	0	1	0	4	5	26	−21	2	Relegated to the 2016 Division II B Qualification (Note: Belgium actually did not participate in 2016. Their next World Championship participation was in the 2017 Division II B Qualification.)

Source: IIHF
(H) Host

=== Division II Group B Qualification ===
The Division II Group B Qualification tournament was played in Hong Kong, from 18 to 21 February 2015.

Pos	Team	Pld	W	OTW	OTL	L	GF	GA	GD	Pts	Promotion
1	Turkey	3	3	0	0	0	23	8	+15	9	Promoted to the 2016 Division II B
2	Hong Kong (H)	3	2	0	0	1	10	8	+2	6	
3	South Africa	3	1	0	0	2	13	12	+1	3	
4	Bulgaria	3	0	0	0	3	4	22	−18	0	

Source: IIHF
(H) Host
