= Anna Caumo =

Italian ice hockey player (born 2002)

- Born: 16 February 2002 (age 24) Brunico, Italy
- Height: 1.67 m (5 ft 6 in)
- Weight: 67 kg (148 lb; 10 st 8 lb)
- Position: Forward
- Shoots: Left
- NEHWA team Former teams: Franklin Pierce Ravens; EV Bozen Eagles; Maine Black Bears
- National team: Italy
- Playing career: 2015–present

Anna Caumo (born 16 February 2002) is an Italian ice hockey player. She is a member of the Italian women's national ice hockey team that participated in the women's ice hockey tournament at the 2026 Winter Olympics.

== Playing career ==
=== College ===
Caumo played one season (2022–23) of college ice hockey with the Maine Black Bears women's ice hockey program in the Hockey East (HEA) conference of the NCAA Division I. She scored her first goal with Maine on 27 January 2023, defeating the UConn Huskies in a 5–4 overtime triumph.

Two of her teammates that season, Lilli Welcke and Luisa Welcke, played for Germany at the 2026 Winter Olympics.

In the autumn of 2023, she joined the Franklin Pierce Ravens women's ice hockey team of the New England Women's Hockey Alliance (NEWHA) conference. She is the first player in program history named to an Olympic roster.

=== International ===
Making her Olympic debut on 5 February 2026, as Italy hosted France, Caumo played on a line with Rebecca Roccella and Kristin Della Rovere. In the third period, Caumo logged an assist on a goal by Della Rovere, as Italy prevailed in a 4–1 final,. resulting in Italy's first Olympic win in women's hockey.

In the quarterfinals of the 2026 Olympics, Italy played the United States, marking the first time they played each other in women's ice hockey at the Winter Olympics. Caumo registered one of Italy's six shots on net, logging 21:52 of ice time in a 6–0 loss.
