= Ice hockey at the 2022 Winter Olympics – Women's tournament =

2022 Winter Olympics

Tournament details
- Host country: China
- Venue(s): Beijing National Indoor Stadium; Wukesong Arena
- Dates: 3–17 February 2022
- Teams: 10

Final positions
- Champions: Canada (5th title)
- Runners-up: United States
- Third place: Finland
- Fourth place: Switzerland

Tournament statistics
- Games played: 28
- Goals scored: 176 (6.29 per game)
- Attendance: 16,662 (595 per game)
- Scoring leader: (Canada) Sarah Nurse (18 points)

Awards
- MVP: (Canada) Brianne Jenner

The women's tournament in ice hockey at the 2022 Winter Olympics was held in Beijing, China between 3 and 17 February 2022. Ten countries qualified for the tournament; six of them did so automatically by virtue of their ranking by the International Ice Hockey Federation, one, China, automatically qualified as hosts, while the three others took part in a qualification tournament.

The United States had been the defending champion. Canada won the gold medal, defeating the United States in the final 3–2. Finland defeated Switzerland 4–0 for the bronze medal. The final standings from first through seventh place were an exact repeat of the 2021 IIHF Women's World Championship.

== Qualified teams ==
Event	Date	Location	Vacancies	Qualified
Hosts	17 May 2018	(Denmark) Copenhagen	1	China
2020 IIHF World Ranking	12 December 2016 – 10 April 2020	—N/a	6	United States; Canada; Finland (Russia) ROC; Switzerland; Japan
Final qualification tournament	11–14 November 2021	(Czech Republic) Chomutov	1	Czech Republic
Final qualification tournament	11–14 November 2021	(Germany) Füssen	1	Denmark
Final qualification tournament	11–14 November 2021	(Sweden) Luleå	1	Sweden
Total			10	

Notes

1. ^{a} 2020 IIHF World Ranking and formulated from the following events: 2017 World Championship, 2018 World Championship, 2018 Winter Olympic Games, 2019 World Championship and 2020 World Championship
2. ^{b} Halifax and Truro were the sites for 2020 IIHF World Championship; the conclusion of the tournament the ranking was to be finalized with regards to the direct qualification slots, but several 2020 Women's Ice Hockey World Championships were cancelled due to the COVID-19 pandemic. Seeding for 2020 was used in lieu of placement to determine ranking for unplayed tournaments.

== Format ==
The ten teams were split into two groups of five teams each, in which they played against each team once. All teams from Group A and the top-three ranked teams from Group B advanced to the quarterfinals. A knockout system was used after the group stage.

== Venues ==
Beijing National Indoor Stadium Capacity: 19,418	Wukesong Arena Capacity: 15,384
Beijing National Indoor Stadium	Cadillac Arena
Beijing	Beijing

== Match officials ==
12 referees and 12 linesmen were selected for the tournament.

Referees

- (Canada) Cianna Lieffers
- (Canada) Elizabeth Mantha
- (Canada) Lacey Senuk
- (Finland) Anniina Nurmi
- (Germany) Tijana Haack
- (Russia) Daria Abrosimova
- (Russia) Daria Ermak
- (Slovakia) Nikoleta Celárová
- (Sweden) Maria Furberg
- (Switzerland) Anna Wiegand
- (United States) Kelly Cooke
- (United States) Chelsea Rapin

Linesmen

- (Austria) Julia Kainberger
- (Canada) Alex Clarke
- (Canada) Justine Todd
- (Finland) Jenni Heikkinen
- (Finland) Linnea Sainio
- (Germany) Lisa Linnek
- (Russia) Diana Mokhova
- (Sweden) Anna Hammar
- (Sweden) Veronica Lovensnö
- (United States) Kendall Hanley
- (United States) Jacqueline Spresser
- (United States) Sara Strong

== Preliminary round ==
All times are local (UTC+8).

=== Tiebreak criteria ===
In each group, teams were ranked according to the following criteria:

1. Number of points (three points for a regulation-time win, two points for an overtime or shootout win, one point for an overtime or shootout defeat, no points for a regulation-time defeat);
2. In case two teams are tied on points, the result of their head-to-head match will determine the ranking;
3. In case three or four teams are tied on points, the following criteria will apply (if, after applying a criterion, only two teams remain tied, the result of their head-to-head match will determine their ranking):
  1. Points obtained in head-to-head matches between the teams concerned;
  2. Goal differential in head-to-head matches between the teams concerned;
  3. Number of goals scored in head-to-head matches between the teams concerned;
  4. If three teams remain tied, result of head-to-head matches between each of the teams concerned and the remaining team in the group (points, goal difference, goals scored);
  5. Place in 2021 IIHF World Ranking.

=== Group A ===
Pos	Team	Pld	W	OTW	OTL	L	GF	GA	GD	Pts	Qualification
1	Canada	4	4	0	0	0	33	5	+28	12	Quarterfinals
2	United States	4	3	0	0	1	20	6	+14	9	Quarterfinals
3	Finland	4	1	0	0	3	10	19	−9	3 (Note: Finland 3 Pts, +4 GD; ROC 3 Pts, −2 GD; Switzerland 3 Pts, −2 GD. ROC defeated Switzerland 5–2.)	Quarterfinals
4	ROC	4	1	0	0	3	6	18	−12	3	Quarterfinals
5	Switzerland	4	1	0	0	3	6	27	−21	3	Quarterfinals

Source: IIHF
Rules for classification: Tiebreakers
Notes:

3 February 2022; 12:10 v	Canada	12–1 (3–0, 5–0, 4–1)	Switzerland	Beijing National Indoor Stadium, Beijing; Attendance: 821

Game reference

Ann-Renée Desbiens
Goalies
Andrea Brändli
Referees:
(Russia) Daria Ermak
(Switzerland) Anna Wiegand
Linesmen:
(Germany) Lisa Linnek
(Finland) Linnea Sainio

Fillier (Spooner) – 01:04	1–0
Fillier (Poulin) – 07:55	2–0
Spooner (Fillier, Ambrose) – 11:20	3–0
Johnston (Thompson, Turnbull) – 28:06	4–0
Stacey (Bell) – 28:21	5–0
Spooner (Nurse, Thompson) (PP) – 33:20	6–0
Turnbull (Thompson, Johnston) – 35:40	7–0
Stacey (Shelton) – 37:02	8–0
Turnbull (Rattray, Spooner) – 46:14	9–0
	9–1	48:30 – Stalder (Christen) (PP2)
Bell (Turnbull, Johnston) – 53:46	10–1
Thompson (Johnston, Nurse) – 56:20	11–1
Ambrose (Spooner, Thompson) (PP) – 59:58	12–1

14 min
Penalties
8 min
70
Shots
15

3 February 2022; 21:10 v	Finland	2–5 (0–2, 0–2, 2–1)	United States	Wukesong Arena, Beijing; Attendance: 335

Game reference

Anni Keisala
Goalies
Maddie Rooney
Referees:
(United States) Kelly Cooke
(Canada) Lacey Senuk
Linesmen:
(Canada) Alex Clarke
(United States) Sara Strong

	0–1	10:37 – Kessel (Harmon)
	0–2	13:00 – Carpenter (Pannek, Dunne) (PP)
	0–3	25:32 – Coyne Schofield (Barnes, Compher)
	0–4	26:36 – Coyne Schofield (Harmon, Knight)
Tapani (Laitinen, Nieminen) (PP) – 43:15	1–4
	1–5	48:01 – Carpenter (Roque, Kessel)
Tapani (Karvinen) (PP) – 57:40	2–5

8 min
Penalties
6 min
12
Shots
52

4 February 2022; 12:10 v	ROC	5–2 (2–1, 2–1, 1–0)	Switzerland	Beijing National Indoor Stadium, Beijing

Game reference

Maria Sorokina
Goalies
Andrea Brändli
Referees:
(Canada) Cianna Lieffers
(Canada) Elizabeth Mantha
Linesmen:
(United States) Kendall Hanley
(United States) Jacqueline Spresser

Dobrodeyeva (Vafina, Pavlova) – 05:54	1–0
	1–1	17:16 – Stalder (Christen, Müller) (PP)
Bolgareva (Kadirova) – 17:29	2–1
	2–2	26:57 – Müller (Ryhner) (SH)
Shibanova (Pechnikova, Bratisheva) – 30:30	3–2
Bolgareva (Kadirova) – 37:07	4–2
Bolgareva (Vafina) (SH) – 41:39	5–2

10 min
Penalties
6 min
31
Shots
30

5 February 2022; 12:10 v	Canada	11–1 (2–1, 5–0, 4–0)	Finland	Wukesong Arena, Beijing; Attendance: 670

Game reference

Ann-Renée Desbiens
Goalies
Meeri Räisänen
Anni Keisala
Referees:
(United States) Chelsea Rapin
(Switzerland) Anna Wiegand
Linesmen:
(Germany) Lisa Linnek
(Sweden) Veronica Lovensnö

Fillier (Spooner, Thompson) – 01:01	1–0
Nurse – 12:45	2–0
	2–1	18:27 – Tuominen
Fillier (Fast, Spooner) – 23:22	3–1
Nurse (Spooner, Rattray) – 30:01	4–1
Jenner (Larocque, Poulin) – 31:20	5–1
Jenner (Zandee-Hart, Poulin) – 34:27	6–1
Stacey (Maltais, Shelton) – 36:35	7–1
Rattray (Jenner, Bell) – 47:06	8–1
Nurse (Ambrose, Spooner) – 53:07	9–1
Stacey (Shelton, Bell) – 54:10	10–1
Jenner (Clark, Poulin) – 54:45	11–1

14 min
Penalties
8 min
48
Shots
29

5 February 2022; 21:10 v	United States	5–0 (1–0, 1–0, 3–0)	ROC	Wukesong Arena, Beijing; Attendance: 581

Game reference

Nicole Hensley
Goalies
Maria Sorokina
Daria Gredzen
Referees:
(Germany) Tijana Haack
(Finland) Anniina Nurmi
Linesmen:
(Sweden) Anna Hammar
(Finland) Jenni Heikkinen

Harmon (Knight, Brandt) – 12:29	1–0
Knight (Harmon, Coyne Schofield) – 28:51	2–0
Zumwinkle (Cameranesi, Bozek) – 43:57	3–0
Compher (Murphy, Scamurra) – 46:15	4–0
Carpenter (Kessel, Harmon) – 48:44	5–0

6 min
Penalties
14 min
62
Shots
12

6 February 2022; 21:10 v	Switzerland	0–8 (0–5, 0–2, 0–1)	United States	Wukesong Arena, Beijing; Attendance: 545

Game reference

Andrea Brändli
Saskia Maurer
Goalies
Alex Cavallini
Referees:
(Sweden) Maria Furberg
(Canada) Lacey Senuk
Linesmen:
(Canada) Alex Clarke
(United States) Sara Strong

0–1	05:40 – Knight (Brandt, Keller) (PP)
0–2	14:04 – Compher (Scamurra, Bozek)
0–3	14:13 – Knight
0–4	16:15 – Pannek
0–5	19:38 – Kessel (Dunne, Barnes)
0–6	22:11 – Pannek (Kessel, Carpenter)
0–7	37:12 – Compher (Bozek, Dunne)
0–8	57:29 – Cameranesi (Pannek, Barnes)

8 min
Penalties
4 min
12
Shots
66

7 February 2022; 13:15 v	ROC	1–6 (0–2, 1–2, 0–2)	Canada	Wukesong Arena, Beijing; Attendance: 545

Game reference

Daria Gredzen
Maria Sorokina
Goalies
Emerance Maschmeyer
Referees:
(Russia) Daria Ermak
(United States) Chelsea Rapin
Linesmen:
(Sweden) Veronica Lovensnö
(Finland) Linnea Sainio

	0–1	02:09 – Nurse
	0–2	02:29 – Fillier (Fast, Rattray)
	0–3	27:45 – Rattray (Spooner, Nurse) (PP)
	0–4	30:29 – Ambrose (Johnston, Stacey)
Shokhina (Vafina) – 37:21	1–4
	1–5	40:39 – Johnston (Jenner, Poulin) (PP)
	1–6	45:50 – Poulin (Jenner, Ambrose) (PP)

14 min
Penalties
8 min
12
Shots
49

7 February 2022; 21:10 v	Switzerland	3–2 (1–0, 1–1, 1–1)	Finland	Beijing National Indoor Stadium, Beijing; Attendance: 742

Game reference

Andrea Brändli
Goalies
Anni Keisala
Referees:
(Canada) Cianna Lieffers
(Canada) Elizabeth Mantha
Linesmen:
(United States) Kendall Hanley
(Russia) Diana Mokhova

Christen (Müller, Stalder) (PP2) – 11:52	1–0
	1–1	27:49 – Laitinen (Savolainen, Tuominen) (PP)
Rüegg (Müller, Leemann) (PP, EA) – 30:00	2–1
Stalder (Müller, Sigrist) – 41:21	3–1
	3–2	50:11 – Holopainen (Vainikkaa, Tulus)

6 min
Penalties
14 min
24
Shots
40

8 February 2022; 12:10 v	United States	2–4 (0–1, 2–3, 0–0)	Canada	Wukesong Arena, Beijing; Attendance: 591

Game reference

Maddie Rooney
Goalies
Ann-Renée Desbiens
Referees:
(Canada) Cianna Lieffers
(Canada) Lacey Senuk
(Canada) Elizabeth Mantha
Linesmen:
(United States) Kendall Hanley
(United States) Jacqueline Spresser

	0–1	14:10 – Jenner (Fillier, Poulin) (PP)
Cameranesi (Pannek, Barnes) – 29:17	1–1
Carpenter (Kessel, Keller) (PP) – 31:34	2–1
	2–2	32:00 – Jenner (Nurse)
	2–3	34:25 – Rattray (Spooner, Zandee-Hart)
	2–4	37:25 – Poulin (PS)

2 min
Penalties
12 min
53
Shots
27

8 February 2022; 21:10 v	Finland	5–0 (2–0, 3–0, 0–0)	ROC	Beijing National Indoor Stadium, Beijing; Attendance: 797

Game reference

Anni Keisala
Goalies
Maria Sorokina
Valeria Merkusheva
Referees:
(United States) Kelly Cooke
(Switzerland) Anna Wiegand
Linesmen:
(Canada) Alex Clarke
(United States) Sara Strong

Rantala (Niskanen) – 09:06	1–0
Karvinen (Nieminen, Tulus) (PP) – 18:18	2–0
Nylund (Vanhanen, Rantala) – 27:09	3–0
Tuominen (Laitinen) (PP) – 30:37	4–0
Tapani (Hiirikoski, Tulus) (PP) – 31:06	5–0

6 min
Penalties
14 min
30
Shots
19

=== Group B ===
Pos	Team	Pld	W	OTW	OTL	L	GF	GA	GD	Pts	Qualification
1	Japan	4	2	1	1	0	13	7	+6	9	Quarterfinals
2	Czech Republic	4	2	0	1	1	10	8	+2	7	Quarterfinals
3	Sweden	4	2	0	0	2	7	8	−1	6	Quarterfinals
4	China (H)	4	1	1	0	2	7	7	0	5	Eliminated
5	Denmark	4	1	0	0	3	7	14	−7	3	Eliminated

Source: IIHF
Rules for classification: Tiebreakers
(H) Host

3 February 2022; 12:10 v	Czech Republic	3–1 (1–0, 1–1, 1–0)	China	Wukesong Arena, Beijing; Attendance: 499

Game reference

Klára Peslarová
Goalies
Tia Chan
Referees:
(Germany) Tijana Haack
(Finland) Anniina Nurmi
Linesmen:
(Sweden) Anna Hammar
(Austria) Julia Kainberger

Radová (Vanišová, Mrázová) – 10:38	1–0
Křížová (Neubauerová, Čajanová) – 23:57	2–0
	2–1	29:02 – Miller (Lum, Wong) (PP)
Pejzlová (Horálková) – 46:27	3–1

4 min
Penalties
6 min
36
Shots
14

3 February 2022; 16:40 v	Sweden	1–3 (0–1, 1–0, 0–2)	Japan	Wukesong Arena, Beijing; Attendance: 482

Game reference

Emma Söderberg
Goalies
Nana Fujimoto
Referees:
(Canada) Cianna Lieffers
(Canada) Elizabeth Mantha
Linesmen:
(United States) Kendall Hanley
(Russia) Diana Mokhova

	0–1	19:13 – Koike (Kubo, Osawa)
Nylén Persson (Wikner-Zienkiewicz) – 20:30	1–1
	1–2	44:03 – Ukita (Ak. Shiga, Ao. Shiga)
	1–3	58:59 – Yoneyama (Koyama, Hosoyamada) (ENG)

6 min
Penalties
4 min
27
Shots
40

4 February 2022; 12:10 v	Denmark	1–3 (1–0, 0–1, 0–2)	China	Wukesong Arena, Beijing; Attendance: 580

Game reference

Cassandra Repstock-Romme
Goalies
Kimberly Newell
Referees:
(Russia) Daria Ermak
(United States) Chelsea Rapin
Linesmen:
(Sweden) Veronica Lovensnö
(Finland) Linnea Sainio

Frandsen (N. Jensen, Glud) – 08:06	1–0
	1–1	36:46 – Lum (Yu, Wong)
	1–2	59:10 – Llanes (Lum)
	1–3	59:28 – Lum (ENG)

6 min
Penalties
6 min
23
Shots
32

5 February 2022; 16:40 v	Japan	6–2 (3–0, 2–1, 1–1)	Denmark	Wukesong Arena, Beijing; Attendance: 476

Game reference

Nana Fujimoto
Akane Konishi
Goalies
Cassandra Repstock-Romme
Lisa Jensen
Referees:
(United States) Kelly Cooke
(Sweden) Maria Furberg
Linesmen:
(Canada) Alex Clarke
(United States) Sara Strong

H. Yamashita (Miura, Koike) – 10:46	1–0
H. Toko (Ao. Shiga, A. Toko) – 12:08	2–0
Ukita – 13:50	3–0
A. Toko (H. Toko) – 22:53	4–0
	4–1	29:16 – Bau Hansen (N. Jensen)
Ak. Shiga (Kubo, H. Toko) (PP) – 39:54	5–1
H. Yoneyama (H. Yamashita, Koike) – 48:02	6–1
	6–2	59:55 – Jakobsen (Persson, Weis) (PP)

8 min
Penalties
8 min
42
Shots
20

5 February 2022; 16:40 v	Czech Republic	3–1 (1–0, 1–1, 1–0)	Sweden	Beijing National Indoor Stadium, Beijing; Attendance: 438

Game reference

Klára Peslarová
Goalies
Emma Söderberg
Referees:
(Canada) Cianna Lieffers
(Canada) Elizabeth Mantha
Linesmen:
(Russia) Diana Mokhova
(United States) Jacqueline Spresser

Vanišová – 18:23	1–0
Hymlárová (SH) – 33:56	2–0
	2–1	39:16 – Muren (Lin. Johansson, Adolfsson)
Vanišová – 54:03	3–1

12 min
Penalties
8 min
46
Shots
28

6 February 2022; 16:40 v	China	2–1 GWS (0–1, 0–0, 1–0) (OT: 0–0) (SO: 1–0)	Japan	Wukesong Arena, Beijing; Attendance: 506

Game reference
Kimberly Newell	Goalies	Nana Fujimoto	Referees: (Germany) Tijana Haack (Finland) Anniina Nurmi; Linesmen: (Finland) Jenni Heikkinen (Austria) Julia Kainberger
/ 0–1 / 18:02 – Hosoyamada (Koike, Osawa) (PP); Woo (Kolstad) – 41:06 / 1–1			Referees: (Germany) Tijana Haack (Finland) Anniina Nurmi; Linesmen: (Finland) Jenni Heikkinen (Austria) Julia Kainberger
Lum (miss); Llanes (miss); Segedi (miss); Miller	Shootout	(miss) Kubo; (miss) Shiga; (miss) Ukita; (miss) H. Toko; (miss) A. Toko	Referees: (Germany) Tijana Haack (Finland) Anniina Nurmi; Linesmen: (Finland) Jenni Heikkinen (Austria) Julia Kainberger
6 min	Penalties	0 min	Referees: (Germany) Tijana Haack (Finland) Anniina Nurmi; Linesmen: (Finland) Jenni Heikkinen (Austria) Julia Kainberger
30	Shots	33	Referees: (Germany) Tijana Haack (Finland) Anniina Nurmi; Linesmen: (Finland) Jenni Heikkinen (Austria) Julia Kainberger

7 February 2022; 16:40 v	Denmark	3–2 (1–1, 1–1, 1–0)	Czech Republic	Wukesong Arena, Beijing; Attendance: 637

Game reference

Cassandra Repstock-Romme
Goalies
Viktorie Švejdová
Referees:
(Sweden) Maria Furberg
(Canada) Lacey Senuk
Linesmen:
(Canada) Alex Clarke
(United States) Sara Strong

	0–1	05:48 – Tejralová (Křížová)
Jakobsen – 09:14	1–1
	1–2	23:01 – Mrázová (Radová, Vanišová)
Weis – 24:28	2–2
Glud (Jakobsen, N. Jensen) (PP) – 40:49	3–2

12 min
Penalties
8 min
17
Shots
32

7 February 2022; 21:10 v	China	1–2 (1–0, 0–2, 0–0)	Sweden	Wukesong Arena, Beijing; Attendance: 588

Game reference

Kimberly Newell
Goalies
Emma Söderberg
Referees:
(Finland) Anniina Nurmi
(Switzerland) Anna Wiegand
Linesmen:
(Finland) Jenni Heikkinen
(Austria) Julia Kainberger

Betinol (Lum) – 05:16	1–0
	1–1	25:14 – Wikner-Zienkiewicz (PS)
	1–2	26:39 – Bouveng (Nylén Persson, Waxin)

2 min
Penalties
8 min
33
Shots
33

8 February 2022; 16:40 v	Japan	3–2 GWS (1–0, 0–1, 1–1) (OT: 0–0) (SO: 1–0)	Czech Republic	Wukesong Arena, Beijing; Attendance: 638

Game reference

Nana Fujimoto
Goalies
Klára Peslarová
Referees:
(Russia) Daria Abrosimova
(Russia) Daria Ermak
Linesmen:
(Germany) Lisa Linnek
(Finland) Linnea Sainio

H. Toko (Ao. Shiga, A. Toko) (PP) – 04:00	1–0
	1–1	26:09 – Křížová (Vanišová)
H. Toko (Kubo, A. Toko) (PP) – 40:23	2–1
	2–2	45:53 – Mlýnková

Ukita (miss)
Kubo
Koyama (miss)
H. Toko (miss)
Ak. Shiga (miss)
Shootout
(miss) Pátková
(miss) Křížová
(miss) Pejzlová
(miss) Mrázová
(miss) Mills
6 min
Penalties
10 min
25
Shots
38

8 February 2022; 21:10 v	Sweden	3–1 (1–0, 1–1, 1–0)	Denmark	Wukesong Arena, Beijing; Attendance: 696

Game reference

Emma Söderberg
Goalies
Cassandra Repstock-Romme
Referees:
(Finland) Anniina Nurmi
(United States) Chelsea Rapin
Linesmen:
(Sweden) Anna Hammar
(Finland) Jenni Heikkinen

Nordin (Lundin) – 04:00	1–0
	1–1	34:04 – Oksbjerg (Jakobsen, Friis-Hansen)
Lis. Johansson (Lundin, Waxin) (PP) – 36:00	2–1
Berglund (Ljungblom) (PP, ENG) – 59:43	3–1

14 min
Penalties
10 min
21
Shots
26

== Playoff round ==
=== Ranking ===
Winning teams were reseeded for the semi-finals in accordance with the following ranking:

1. tier of the group played in
2. rank within group

Rank	Team	Grp	Pos
1	Canada	A	1
2	United States	A	2
3	Finland	A	3
4	ROC	A	4
5	Switzerland	A	5
6	Japan	B	1
7	Czech Republic	B	2
8	Sweden	B	3

=== Bracket ===
Quarter-finals
11 February
Canada	11
Sweden	0
12 February
ROC	2
Switzerland	4
11 February
United States	4
Czech Republic	1
12 February
Finland	7
Japan	1

Semi-finals
14 February
Canada	10
Switzerland	3
14 February
United States	4
Finland	1

Gold medal game
17 February
Canada	3
United States	2
Bronze medal game
16 February
Finland	4
Switzerland	0

=== Quarterfinals ===
11 February 2022; 12:10 v	United States	4–1 (0–0, 1–1, 3–0)	Czech Republic	Wukesong Arena, Beijing; Attendance: 636

Game reference

Alex Cavallini
Goalies
Klára Peslarová
Referees:
(Canada) Elizabeth Mantha
(Finland) Anniina Nurmi
Linesmen:
(Sweden) Anna Hammar
(United States) Kendall Hanley

	0–1	24:59 – Pejzlová (Vanišová, Křížová)
Knight (Coyne Schofield) – 25:47	1–1
Stecklein (Pannek, Keller) – 46:49	2–1
Harmon (Brandt, Knight) (PP) – 56:51	3–1
Coyne Schofield (Keller) (ENG) – 59:54	4–1

11 min
Penalties
10 min
59
Shots
6

11 February 2022; 21:10 v	Canada	11–0 (4–0, 5–0, 2–0)	Sweden	Wukesong Arena, Beijing; Attendance: 669

Game reference

Emerance Maschmeyer
Goalies
Emma Söderberg
Ida Boman
Referees:
(Russia) Daria Abrosimova
(Canada) Lacey Senuk
Linesmen:
(Canada) Alex Clarke
(Austria) Julia Kainberger

Jenner (Poulin, Nurse) – 03:05	1–0
Fillier (Johnston, Poulin) (PP) – 17:05	2–0
Fillier (Rattray, Fast) – 17:41	3–0
Rattray (Thompson, Nurse) (PP) – 19:35	4–0
Spooner (Nurse, Larocque) (PP) – 23:16	5–0
Ambrose (Poulin, Thompson) – 25:15	6–0
Turnbull (Ambrose, Saulnier) – 26:56	7–0
Jenner (Poulin, Nurse) – 28:13	8–0
Clark (Bell, Hart) (PP) – 29:09	9–0
Jenner (Hart, Thompson) – 50:55	10–0
Fillier (Spooner, Fast) – 52:06	11–0

8 min
Penalties
14 min
56
Shots
11

12 February 2022; 12:10 v	ROC	2–4 (0–0, 1–1, 1–3)	Switzerland	Wukesong Arena, Beijing; Attendance: 670

Game reference

Valeria Merkusheva
Goalies
Andrea Brändli
Referees:
(United States) Kelly Cooke
(United States) Chelsea Rapin
Linesmen:
(Finland) Jenni Heikkinen
(United States) Sara Strong

	0–1	34:31 – Stänz (Müller, Stalder)
Savonina (Shokhina, Korzhakova) – 37:38	1–1
	1–2	47:31 – Rüegg (Moy, Vallario)
Kadirova (Luchnikova, Provorova) – 56:53	2–2
	2–3	57:23 – Müller (Stalder)
	2–4	59:58 – Müller (SH, ENG)

4 min
Penalties
6 min
24
Shots
36

12 February 2022; 16:40 v	Finland	7–1 (2–1, 2–0, 3–0)	Japan	Wukesong Arena, Beijing; Attendance: 675

Game reference

Anni Keisala
Goalies
Nana Fujimoto
Akane Konishi
Referees:
(Canada) Cianna Lieffers
(Switzerland) Anna Wiegand
Linesmen:
(Germany) Lisa Linnek
(Sweden) Veronica Lovensnö

Nieminen (Tulus, Hiirikoski) (PP) – 02:08	1–0
Vainikka (Laitinen, Holopainen) – 04:32	2–0
	2–1	15:01 – Shiga (H. Toko)
Karvinen (Nieminen, Tapani) – 25:01	3–1
Nieminen (Karvinen, Laitinen) – 28:29	4–1
Nieminen (Tapani, Hiirikoski) – 40:18	5–1
Tapani (Karvinen, Nieminen) – 48:28	6–1
Hakala (Niskanen, Laitinen) – 52:29	7–1

8 min
Penalties
4 min
49
Shots
25

=== Semifinals ===
14 February 2022; 12:10 v	Canada	10–3 (5–1, 3–2, 2–0)	Switzerland	Wukesong Arena, Beijing; Attendance: 645

Game reference

Ann-Renee Desbiens
Goalies
Andrea Brändli
Saskia Maurer
Referees:
(Finland) Anniina Nurmi
(United States) Chelsea Rapin
Linesmen:
(Finland) Jenni Hekkinen
(United States) Jackie Spresser

Thompson (Johnston) – 07:16	1–0
Rattray (Ambrose, Fillier) – 08:28	2–0
Turnbull (Thompson, Johnston) – 09:04	3–0
Fast (Nurse, Jenner) – 09:21	4–0
Ambrose (Daoust, Spooner) – 10:40	5–0
	5–1	18:37 – Stalder (Müller) (PP)
	5–2	24:59 – Müller (Stalder)
Poulin (Nurse) – 27:52	6–2
Clark (Johnston, Turnbull) – 28:03	7–2
	7–3	29:44 – Stalder (PP)
Poulin (Nurse, Thompson) – 33:27	8–3
Maltais (Stacey, Saulnier) – 43:13	9–3
Jenner (Nurse) – 58:11	10–3

8 min
Penalties
4 min
61
Shots
13

14 February 2022; 21:10 v	United States	4–1 (0–0, 2–0, 2–1)	Finland	Wukesong Arena, Beijing; Attendance: 642

Game reference

Alex Cavallini
Goalies
Anni Keisala
Referees:
(United States) Kelly Cooke
(Canada) Cianna Lieffers
Linesmen:
(Sweden) Anna Hammar
(Austria) Julia Kainberger

Barnes (Brandt, Knight) (PP) – 23:39	1–0
Knight (Harmon, Coyne Schofield) – 38:53	2–0
Scamurra (Barnes) – 55:20	3–0
	3–1	59:34 – Tapani (Karvinen, Hiirikoski) (EA)
Roque (Carpenter, Kessel) (ENG) – 59:55	4–1

6 min
Penalties
6 min
42
Shots
26

=== Bronze medal game ===
16 February 2022; 19:30 v	Finland	4–0 (1–0, 0–0, 3–0)	Switzerland	Wukesong Arena, Beijing; Attendance: 724

Game reference

Anni Keisala
Goalies
Andrea Brändli
Referees:
(Canada) Elizabeth Mantha
(Canada) Lacey Senuk
Linesmen:
(Canada) Alex Clarke
(United States) Sara Strong

Vainikkaa (Tulus, Holopainen) – 11:38	1–0
Tapani (SH) – 43:24	2–0
Laitinen (Holopainen, Savolainen) (PP) – 54:24	3–0
Karvinen (Nieminen, Hiirikoski) (PP) – 59:03	4–0

8 min
Penalties
8 min
47
Shots
15

=== Gold medal game ===
17 February 2022; 12:10	Canada	3–2 (2–0, 1–1, 0–1)	United States	Wukesong Arena, Beijing; Attendance: 834

Game reference

Ann-Renee Desbiens
Goalies
Alex Cavallini
Referees:
(United States) Kelly Cooke
(Switzerland) Anna Wiegand
Linesmen:
(Sweden) Anna Hammar
(United States) Kendall Hanley

Nurse (Thompson, Poulin) – 07:50	1–0
Poulin – 15:02	2–0
Poulin (Jenner, Nurse) – 29:08	3–0
	3–1	36:39 – Knight (Brandt) (SH)
	3–2	59:47 – Kessel (Roque, Carpenter) (PP, EA)

6 min
Penalties
4 min
21
Shots
40

== Medalists ==
Event	Gold	Silver	Bronze
Women's tournament	Canada; Erin Ambrose; Ashton Bell; Kristen Campbell; Emily Clark; Mélodie Daoust; Ann-Renée Desbiens; Renata Fast; Sarah Fillier; Brianne Jenner; Rebecca Johnston; Jocelyne Larocque; Emma Maltais; Emerance Maschmeyer; Sarah Nurse; Marie-Philip Poulin; Jamie Lee Rattray; Jill Saulnier; Ella Shelton; Natalie Spooner; Laura Stacey; Claire Thompson; Blayre Turnbull; Micah Zandee-Hart	United States; Cayla Barnes; Megan Bozek; Hannah Brandt; Dani Cameranesi; Alex Carpenter; Alex Cavallini; Jesse Compher; Kendall Coyne Schofield; Brianna Decker; Jincy Roese; Savannah Harmon; Caroline Harvey; Nicole Hensley; Megan Keller; Amanda Kessel; Hilary Knight; Abbey Murphy; Kelly Pannek; Maddie Rooney; Abby Roque; Hayley Scamurra; Lee Stecklein; Grace Zumwinkle	Finland; Sanni Hakala; Jenni Hiirikoski; Elisa Holopainen; Sini Karjalainen; Michelle Karvinen; Anni Keisala; Nelli Laitinen; Julia Liikala; Eveliina Mäkinen; Petra Nieminen; Tanja Niskanen; Jenniina Nylund; Meeri Räisänen; Sanni Rantala; Ronja Savolainen; Sofianna Sundelin; Susanna Tapani; Noora Tulus; Minttu Tuominen; Viivi Vainikka; Sanni Vanhanen; Emilia Vesa; Ella Viitasuo

== Final ranking ==
The places five to eight are ranked by their preliminary round group and then placement.

Pos	Grp	Team	Pld	W	OTW	OTL	L	GF	GA	GD	Pts	Final result
1st place, gold medalist(s)	A	Canada	7	7	0	0	0	57	10	+47	21	Champions
2nd place, silver medalist(s)	A	United States	7	5	0	0	2	30	11	+19	15	Runners-up
3rd place, bronze medalist(s)	A	Finland	7	3	0	0	4	22	24	−2	9	Third place
4	A	Switzerland	7	2	0	0	5	13	43	−30	6	Fourth place
5	A	ROC	5	1	0	0	4	8	22	−14	3	Eliminated in quarterfinals
6	B	Japan	5	2	1	1	1	14	14	0	9	Eliminated in quarterfinals
7	B	Czech Republic	5	2	0	1	2	11	12	−1	7	Eliminated in quarterfinals
8	B	Sweden	5	2	0	0	3	7	19	−12	6	Eliminated in quarterfinals
9	B	China (H)	4	1	1	0	2	7	7	0	5	Eliminated in preliminary round
10	B	Denmark	4	1	0	0	3	7	14	−7	3	Eliminated in preliminary round

Source: IIHF
(H) Host

== Statistics ==
=== Scoring leaders ===
List shows the top ten skaters sorted by points, then goals.

Player	GP	G	A	Pts	+/−	PIM	POS
(Canada) Sarah Nurse	7	5	13	18	+19	4	F
(Canada) Marie-Philip Poulin	7	6	11	17	+9	6	F
(Canada) Brianne Jenner	7	9	5	14	+15	2	F
(Canada) Natalie Spooner	7	3	11	14	+12	0	F
(Canada) Claire Thompson	7	2	11	13	+23	2	D
(Canada) Sarah Fillier	7	8	3	11	+13	0	F
(United States) Hilary Knight	7	6	4	10	+6	0	F
(Switzerland) Alina Müller	7	4	6	10	+1	4	F
(Canada) Rebecca Johnston	7	2	8	10	+8	2	F
(Canada) Jamie Lee Rattray	7	5	4	9	+9	0	F
(Switzerland) Lara Stalder	7	5	4	9	–3	2	F

Note: Pos = Position; GP = Games played; G = Goals; A = Assists; Pts = Points; PIM = Penalty minutes; +/- = Plus/minus; PPG = Power-play goals; SHG = Short-handed goals; GWG = Game-winning goals

Source: IIHF

=== Leading goaltenders ===
Only the top five goaltenders, based on save percentage, who have played at least 40% of their team's minutes, are included in this list.

Player	TOI	GA	GAA	SA	Sv%	SO
(China) Zhou Jiaying	182:46	4	1.31	89	95.51	0
(Czech Republic) Klára Peslarová	262:03	7	1.60	127	94.49	0
(Canada) Ann-Renée Desbiens	300:00	9	1.80	150	94.00	0
(United States) Alex Cavallini	236:51	5	1.27	65	92.31	1
(Japan) Nana Fujimoto	292:54	12	2.46	149	91.95	0

Note: Pos = Position;GP = Games played; Min, TOI = Minutes played; W = Wins; L = Losses; T,T/OT = Ties; OTL = Overtime losses; GA = Goals-against; GAA = Goals-against average; SO = Shutouts; SA = Shots against; SV = Shots saved; SV% = Save percentage;

Source: IIHF

=== Awards ===
The all-star team was announced on 17 February 2022.

Goalkeeper	Defenders	Forwards
(Czech Republic) Klára Peslarová	(Canada) Claire Thompson (Finland) Jenni Hiirikoski	(Canada) Sarah Nurse (Canada) Marie-Philip Poulin (Canada) Brianne Jenner

Brianne Jenner was named the MVP of the tournament.

== See also ==
- Ice hockey at the Winter Olympics
- Ice hockey at the 2022 Winter Olympics – Men's tournament
