= British Women's Ice Hockey Friendship Tournament =

The British Women's Ice Hockey Friendship Tournament has been running for 16 consecutive years every June in Swindon, Wiltshire, United Kingdom at the Link Centre.

== Overview ==
The tournament is currently organised by English Becci Hargreves, Michael Armstrong and their team of helpers from Swindon.

== Participating teams ==
=== 2009 ===
- Basingstoke Bison Ladies
- Bracknell Queen Bees (runner up)
- Bracknell FireBees
- Cardiff Comets
- Chelmsford Cobras
- Coventry Phoenix
- Guildford Lightning ('winner')
- Invicta Dynamics
- Milton Keynes Falcons
- Peterborough Penguins
- Telford Wrekin Raiders
- Swindon Topcats

=== 2008 ===
- Bracknell Queen Bees (winner)
- Slough Phantoms (runner-up)
- Basingstoke Bison
- Bracknell FireBees
- Cardiff Comets
- Chelmsford Cobras
- Coventry Phoenix
- Flintshire Furies
- Invicta Dynamics
- Oxford MidnightStars
- Streatham Storm A
- Streatham Storm B
- Swindon Topcats
- Telford Wrekin Raiders

=== 2007 ===
- Slough Phantoms (winner)
- Swindon Topcats (runner-up)
- Basingstoke Bison
- Bracknell FireBees
- Bracknell Queen Bees
- Cardiff Comets
- Coventry Phoenix
- Guildford Lightning
- Oxford University
- Streatham Storm A
- Streatham Storm B
- Telford Wrekin Raiders

=== 2006 ===
- Cardiff Comets (winner)
- Bracknell Queen Bees (runner-up)
- Chelmsford Cobras
- Coventry Phoenix
- Flintshire Furies
- Guildford Lightning
- Invicta Dynamics
- Oxford City Zodiacs
- Slough Phantoms
- Streatham Storm A
- Streatham Storm B
- Swindon Topcats

=== 2005 ===
- Cardiff Comets (winner)
- Bracknell Queen Bees (runner-up)
- Basingstoke Bison
- Flintshire Furies
- Guildford Lightning
- Invicta Dynamics
- Milton Keynes Falcons
- Oxford City Zodiacs
- Oxford University
- Streatham Storm
- Swindon Topcats
- Telford Wrekin Raiders

=== 2004 ===
- Bracknell Queen Bees (winner)
- Swindon Topcats (runner-up)
- Blackburn Thunder
- Flintshire Furies
- Guildford Lightning
- Invicta Dynamics
- Milton Keynes Falcons
- Oxford City Zodiacs
- Romford Nighthawks
- Sheffield Shadows
- Streatham Storm
- Telford Wrekin Raiders
