= Women's Premier League =

Women's Premier League may refer to:

== Association football ==
- FA Women's Premier League, a football league in England now known as the FA Women's National League
- Ghana Women's Premier League, the top-tier women's football league in Ghana
- Scottish Women's Premier League, a football league in Scotland
- Women's Premier League (Singapore), women's football league in Singapore
- Women's Premier League (Solomon Islands), women's football league in the Solomon Islands
- Women's Premier Soccer League, in the USA
- Welsh Premier Women's Football League, a women's football league in Wales

== Other sports ==
- Women's Premier League (cricket), a T20 cricket league in India
- Women's Premier League Rugby, United States
- Women's Premier League, an ice hockey league in England and Wales
