= Jodie Alderson-Smith =

British ice hockey player (born 1994)

- Born: 27 August 1994 (age 31) Nottingham, Nottinghamshire, England
- Height: 1.60 m (5 ft 3 in)
- Weight: 68 kg (150 lb; 10 st 10 lb)
- Position: Forward
- Shoots: Right
- WNIHL team Former teams: Solihull Vixens; Coventry Blaze NIHL; Nottingham Vipers; Nottingham Cougars; Sheffield Shadows; Deeside Dragons
- National team: Great Britain
- Playing career: 2003–present

Jodie-Leigh Alderson-Smith (born 27 August 1994) is a British ice hockey player. She plays as captain of the Solihull Vixens women's team and the Great Britain women's national ice hockey team, and for the men's Coventry Blaze NIHL. In 2025, she made her 50th appearance for Great Britain women's national team.

== Career ==
Alderson-Smith performed figure skating, but switched sports to ice hockey after getting free tickets to watch her local team. Alongside hockey, she works as a teaching assistant in a special educational needs school.

=== Teams ===
Alderson-Smith plays as captain of the women's top tier Solihull Vixens in the Women's National Ice Hockey Elite League (WNIHL), and in the men's fourth tier for Coventry Blaze NIHL, the National Ice Hockey League (NIHL) affiliate of Coventry Blaze of the Elite Ice Hockey League (EIHL). She has previously played for the Nottingham U16 Girls team and the Nottingham Vipers, Nottingham Cougars and Sheffield Shadows women's teams.

In 2023, Alderson-Smith led the Solihull Vixens to being crowned as Women’s National Ice Hockey Elite League champions for the 2022/2023 season. In the 2024/2025 season, she was top goal scorer for the Solihull Vixens.

In September 2023, Alderson-Smith was an emergency signing for the Welsh men's ice hockey team Deeside Dragons, who play in the NIHL's north division, assisting in a goal from captain James Parsons during her first ice time.

=== Great Britain ===
Alderson-Smith made her debut for Great Britain women's national ice hockey team at the 2014 Women's Ice Hockey World Championships in Italy, scoring in her first game. In 2023, Alderson-Smith was named captain of the Great Britain national women's team, after playing as assistant captain from 2018.

In December 2024, Alderson-Smith scored during the 2026 Winter Olympics qualifying games against Latvia and Spain, but Great Britain did not qualify for the games. In 2025, she made her 50th appearance for Great Britain and led the national women's team at the 2025 IIHF Women's World Championship Division I. In 2026, she was assistant captain of the national women's team and played at the 2026 IIHF Women's World Championship Division IB in Spain.
