= 2026 IIHF Women's World Championship Division I =

Tournament details
- Host countries: Hungary; Spain
- Venues: 2 (in 2 host cities)
- Dates: 12–18 April
- Teams: 12

The 2026 IIHF Women's World Championship Division I consisted of two international ice hockey tournaments of the 2026 Women's Ice Hockey World Championships organised by the International Ice Hockey Federation (IIHF).

Group A was held in Budapest, Hungary and Group B in Puigcerdà, Spain, from 12 to 18 April 2026.

France won Group A and got promoted to the top division, while China was relegated. In Group B, the Netherlands captured promotion and Spain got relegated.

== Group A tournament ==
2026 IIHF Women's World Championship Division I A

Tournament details
- Host country: Hungary
- City: Budapest
- Venue: 1 (in 1 host city)
- Dates: 12–18 April
- Teams: 6

Tournament statistics
- Games played: 15
- Goals scored: 81 (5.4 per game)
- Attendance: 8,210 (547 per game)
- Scoring leader(s): (Italy) Kristin Della Rovere (Italy) Justine Reyes (11 points)

Official website
- Website

=== Participants ===
Team	Qualification
Norway	Placed 9th in 2025 Top Division and was relegated.
Hungary	Host, placed 10th in 2025 Top Division and was relegated.
Slovakia	Placed 3rd in 2025 Division I A.
France	Placed 4th in 2025 Division I A.
China	Placed 5th in 2025 Division I A.
Italy	Placed 1st in 2025 Division I B and was promoted.

=== Match officials ===
Eight referees and linespersons were selected for the tournament.

Referees	Linesperson
(Canada) Grace Barlow; (Canada) Brandy Beecroft; (Germany) Tijana Haack; (United Kingdom) Hollie Neenan; (Italy) Anneke Orlandini; (Sweden) Veronica Lovensnö; (United States) Michaela Bahl; (United States) Shannon Motzko	(Canada) Alannah Beres; (Canada) Sophie Thomson; (Germany) Leonie Ernst; (Poland) Natalia Suchanek; (Sweden) Ottilia Classon; (Switzerland) Jamie Monard; (United States) Janice Bolton; (United States) Breana Kraut

=== Standings ===
Pos	Team	Pld	W	OTW	OTL	L	GF	GA	GD	Pts	Promotion or relegation
1	France	5	3	1	1	0	20	9	+11	12	Promoted to the 2027 Top Division
2	Hungary (H)	5	3	1	0	1	14	7	+7	11	
3	Italy	5	3	0	1	1	19	11	+8	10	
4	Slovakia	5	3	0	0	2	19	10	+9	9	
5	Norway	5	1	0	0	4	8	15	−7	3	
6	China	5	0	0	0	5	1	30	−29	0	Relegated to the 2027 Division I B

Source: IIHF
Rules for classification: 1) points; 2) head-to-head points; 3) head-to-head goal difference; 4) head-to-head number of goals scored; 5) result against closest best-ranked team outside tied teams; 6) result against second-best ranked team outside tied teams; 7) seeding before tournament.
(H) Host

=== Results ===
All times are local (UTC+2).

12 April 2026; 12:30	China	0–7 (0–3, 0–2 ,0–2)	Slovakia	Vasas Jégcentrum, Budapest; Attendance: 115

Game reference

Zhan Jiahui
Lai Guimin
Goalies
Lívia Debnárová
Referees:
(United States) Michaela Bahl
(Italy) Anneke Orlandini
Linesmen:
(Canada) Alannah Beres
(United States) Janice Bolton

0–1	02:09 – Matejková (Halušková, Košecká) (PP)
0–2	03:27 – Hlinka (Halušková)
0–3	04:47 – Halušková
0–4	27:54 – Kapičáková (Lopušanová)
0–5	37:27 – Košecká (Matejková, Hlinka)
0–6	50:31 – Fančovičová (Blichová)
0–7	54:45 – Lopušanová (Tóthová, Kapičáková)

10 min
Penalties
13 min
23
Shots
33

12 April 2026; 16:00	Italy	2–1 (1–0, 0–0, 1–1)	Norway	Vasas Jégcentrum, Budapest; Attendance: 110

Game reference

Gabriella Durante
Goalies
Ena Nystrøm
Referees:
(Canada) Brandy Beecroft
(United Kingdom) Hollie Neenan
Linesmen:
(Sweden) Ottilia Classon
(Germany) Leonie Ernst

Fantin (Abatangelo, Stocker) – 18:08	1–0
Fantin (Fortino) (PP) – 42:15	2–0
	2–1	52:25 – Sirum (Bergesen, Bjelland) (PP)

11 min
Penalties
4 min
28
Shots
26

12 April 2026; 19:30	France	2–3 OT (0–1, 1–1, 1–0) (OT: 0–1)	Hungary	Vasas Jégcentrum, Budapest; Attendance: 1,360

Game reference

Alice Philbert
Goalies
Anikó Németh
Referees:
(Germany) Tijana Haack
(Sweden) Veronica Lovensnö
Linesmen:
(United States) Breana Kraut
(Switzerland) Jamie Monard

	0–1	12:05 – Dabasi (Leidt, Koncz)
Duvin (De Serres) – 25:03	1–1
	1–2	31:52 – Lippai (Kreisz, Seregély) (PP)
Aurard-Bushee (Pelissou) – 54:41	2–2
	2–3	61:43 – Kreisz (Seregély)

8 min
Penalties
8 min
31
Shots
26

13 April 2026; 12:30	Slovakia	4–6 (1–3, 1–3, 2–0)	Italy	Vasas Jégcentrum, Budapest; Attendance: 109

Game reference

Lívia Debnárová
Zuzana Tomečková
Goalies
Gabriella Durante
Referees:
(United States) Shannon Motzko
(United Kingdom) Hollie Neenan
Linesmen:
(Poland) Natalia Suchanek
(Canada) Sophie Thomson

Halušková – 00:12	1–0
	1–1	00:51 – Fortino (Della Rovere, Tutino)
	1–2	05:55 – Reyes (Della Rovere, Mattivi)
	1–3	11:06 – Della Rovere (Reyes, Guerriero)
Matejková (Košecká, Halušková) (PP) – 27:53	2–3
	2–4	32:22 – Caumo (Mattivi, Fortino) (PP)
	2–5	36:06 – Reyes (Della Rovere, Fortino) (PP)
	2–6	38:26 – Caumo (Mattivi, Fortino) (PP)
Lopušanová (Tóthová, Kapičáková) – 44:26	3–6
Kapičáková (Lopušanová) – 45:11	4–6

8 min
Penalties
6 min
29
Shots
27

13 April 2026; 16:00	Norway	1–4 (1–1, 0–1, 0–2)	France	Vasas Jégcentrum, Budapest; Attendance: 117

Game reference

Ena Nystrøm
Goalies
Alice Philbert
Referees:
(Canada) Grace Barlow
(Italy) Anneke Orlandini
Linesmen:
(Canada) Alannah Beres
(Sweden) Ottilia Classon

Brunvold (Bergesen, Bjelland) (PP) – 12:23	1–0
	1–1	06:34 – Boudin (Rozier, Zilliox)
	1–2	39:27 – Pelissou
	1–3	47:11 – De Serres (Rozier, Duvin) (PP)
	1–4	58:11 – Rozier (Le Scodan, Leclerc) (EN)

10 min
Penalties
8 min
32
Shots
32

13 April 2026; 19:30	Hungary	4–0 (3–0, 1–0, 0–0)	China	Vasas Jégcentrum, Budapest; Attendance: 777

Game reference

Anikó Németh
Goalies
Zhan Jiahui
Referees:
(Canada) Brandy Beecroft
(Germany) Tijana Haack
Linesmen:
(Germany) Leonie Ernst
(United States) Breana Kraut

Báhiczki-Tóth (Hiezl, Koncz) – 02:23	1–0
Faragó (Dabasi, Metzler) – 03:24	2–0
Metzler (Jókai Szilágyi, Dabasi) – 13:27	3–0
Pázmándi – 37:45	4–0

2 min
Penalties
4 min
44
Shots
24

15 April 2026; 12:30	Norway	4–0 (1–0, 0–0, 3–0)	China	Vasas Jégcentrum, Budapest; Attendance: 75

Game reference

Ena Nystrøm
Goalies
Zhan Jiahui
Referees:
(United States) Michaela Bahl
(Germany) Tijana Haack
Linesmen:
(United States) Breana Kraut
(Poland) Natalia Suchanek

Bergesen (Fischer) – 07:52	1–0
Tillman – 49:47	2–0
Kruse (Furulund) – 56:47	3–0
Sirum (Kruse, Morset) – 58:52	4–0

2 min
Penalties
10 min
47
Shots
17

15 April 2026; 16:00	Hungary	0–2 (0–0, 0–0, 0–2)	Slovakia	Vasas Jégcentrum, Budapest; Attendance: 1,049

Game reference
Anikó Németh	Goalies	Lívia Debnárová	Referees: (Sweden) Veronica Lovensnö (Italy) Anneke Orlandini; Linesmen: (Canada) Alannah Beres (Switzerland) Jamie Monard
0–1 / 41:34 – Tóthová (Kapičáková); 0–2 / 53:15 – Košecká (Halušková, Fančovičová) (PP)			Referees: (Sweden) Veronica Lovensnö (Italy) Anneke Orlandini; Linesmen: (Canada) Alannah Beres (Switzerland) Jamie Monard
10 min	Penalties	10 min	Referees: (Sweden) Veronica Lovensnö (Italy) Anneke Orlandini; Linesmen: (Canada) Alannah Beres (Switzerland) Jamie Monard
25	Shots	31	Referees: (Sweden) Veronica Lovensnö (Italy) Anneke Orlandini; Linesmen: (Canada) Alannah Beres (Switzerland) Jamie Monard

15 April 2026; 19:30	Italy	2–3 GWS (1–1, 1–0, 0–1) (OT: 0–0) (SO: 0–1)	France	Vasas Jégcentrum, Budapest; Attendance: 165

Game reference

Gabriella Durante
Goalies
Alice Philbert
Referees:
(Canada) Grace Barlow
(United States) Shannon Motzko
Linesmen:
(United States) Janice Bolton
(Canada) Sophie Thomson

	0–1	02:20 – Peyne-Dingival (Pelissou, Huot-Marchand)
Reyes (Caumo, Mattivi) (PP) – 11:44	1–1
Reyes (Stocker, Mattivi) – 25:48	2–1
	2–2	53:06 – Rozier (Duvin, Leclerc)

Reyes (miss)
Della Rovere
Mattivi
Caumo (miss)
Tutino (miss)
Mattivi
Mattivi (miss)
Reyes (miss)
Shootout
(miss) Duvin
Rozier
(miss) Huot-Marchand
(miss) Le Scodan
Aurard-Bushee
Duvin
(miss) Rozier
Duvin
6 min
Penalties
10 min
34
Shots
26

17 April 2026; 12:30	France	8–1 (1–0, 4–0, 3–1)	China	Vasas Jégcentrum, Budapest; Attendance: 82

Game reference

Alice Philbert
Goalies
Zhan Jiahui
Lai Guimin
Referees:
(United States) Shannon Motzko
(United Kingdom) Hollie Neenan
Linesmen:
(Germany) Leonie Ernst
(Poland) Natalia Suchanek

Duvin (Leclerc, Rozier) – 00:48	1–0
Duvin (Le Scodan, Leclerc) (SH) – 23:19	2–0
Peyne-Dingival (Huot-Marchand, Baudrit) – 27:55	3–0
Le Scodan (Aurard-Bushee) – 32:51	4–0
Pelissou (Duvin) (PP) – 38:08	5–0
Duvin (Rozier, De Serres) (PP) – 44:22	6–0
	6–1	45:07 – Zhao Z. (Zhao Q.)
Aurard-Bushee (Baudrit, Berger) – 49:16	7–1
Duvin (Boudin, Rozier) – 50:42	8–1

4 min
Penalties
8 min
55
Shots
13

17 April 2026; 16:00	Hungary	3–2 (0–1, 1–0, 2–1)	Italy	Vasas Jégcentrum, Budapest; Attendance: 1,490

Game reference

Anikó Németh
Goalies
Gabriella Durante
Referees:
(United States) Michaela Bahl
(Sweden) Veronica Lovensnö
Linesmen:
(Switzerland) Jamie Monard
(Canada) Sophie Thomson

	0–1	03:50 – Varano (Reyes, Tutino)
Hiezl (Leidt, Mayer) (PP) – 30:48	1–1
Odnoga (Lippai, Kreisz) (SH) – 41:37	2–1
Huszák (Metzler) – 51:37	3–1
	3–2	52:46 – Caumo (Mattivi, Fortino) (PP)

4 min
Penalties
8 min
31
Shots
27

17 April 2026; 19:30	Slovakia	5–1 (2–0, 2–1, 1–0)	Norway	Vasas Jégcentrum, Budapest; Attendance: 205

Game reference

Lívia Debnárová
Goalies
Ena Nystrøm
Referees:
(Canada) Grace Barlow
(Canada) Brandy Beecroft
Linesmen:
(United States) Janice Bolton
(Sweden) Ottilia Classon

Kapičáková (Lopušanová, Tóthová) – 17:25	1–0
Kapičáková (Lopušanová, Drábeková) – 19:59	2–0
Tóthová (Halušková, Drábeková) (PP) – 31:33	3–0
Lopušanová – 32:41	4–0
	4–1	38:02 – Sirum (Kruse, Bergesen) (PP)
Lopušanová (Kapičáková, Tóthová) – 44:07	5–1

6 min
Penalties
4 min
28
Shots
21

18 April 2026; 12:30	China	0–7 (0–2, 0–3, 0–2)	Italy	Vasas Jégcentrum, Budapest; Attendance: 95

Game reference

Lai Guimin
Goalies
Gabriella Durante
Martina Fedel
Referees:
(Canada) Grace Barlow
(Italy) Anneke Orlandini
Linesmen:
(Canada) Alannah Beres
(Germany) Leonie Ernst

0–1	03:05 – Pierri (Caumo, Della Rovere)
0–2	15:36 – Lobis (Della Rovere, Varano)
0–3	20:24 – Della Rovere (Reyes, Stocker)
0–4	21:47 – Della Rovere (Varano, Reyes)
0–5	30:44 – Della Rovere (Lobis, Reyes) (PP)
0–6	40:40 – Della Rovere (Reyes) (SH)
0–7	54:29 – Reyes (Mattivi, Della Rovere)

6 min
Penalties
6 min
11
Shots
40

18 April 2026; 17:50	Slovakia	1–3 (0–1, 1–1, 0–1)	France	Vasas Jégcentrum, Budapest; Attendance: 825

Game reference

Lívia Debnárová
Goalies
Alice Philbert
Referees:
(United States) Michaela Bahl
(Sweden) Veronica Lovensnö
Linesmen:
(United States) Breana Kraut
(Canada) Sophie Thomson

	0–1	03:08 – Rozier (Duvin)
Hlinka (Beňáková, Fančovičová) (EA) – 26:49	1–1
	1–2	38:43 – De Serres (Aurard-Bushee, Pelissou)
	1–3	59:38 – Aurard-Bushee (Baudrit) (EN)

2 min
Penalties
8 min
27
Shots
16

18 April 2026; 20:30	Norway	1–4 (0–1, 0–0, 1–3)	Hungary	Vasas Jégcentrum, Budapest; Attendance: 1,636

Game reference

Ena Nystrøm
Goalies

Referees:
(Germany) Tijana Haack
(United States) Shannon Motzko
Linesmen:
(United States) Janice Bolton
(Poland) Natalia Suchanek

	0–1	11:12 – Metzler
Fischer (Løkke Nyberg) – 26:49	1–1
	1–2	47:42 – Odnoga (Leidt, Pázmándi) (EA)
	1–3	48:44 – Odnoga (Pázmándi, Seregély)
	1–4	57:31 – Pázmándi (EN)

8 min
Penalties
0 min
8
Shots
46

=== Statistics ===
==== Scoring leaders ====
List shows the top skaters sorted by points, then goals.

Player	GP	G	A	Pts	+/−	PIM	POS
(Italy) Kristin Della Rovere	5	5	6	11	+5	4	F
(Italy) Justine Reyes	5	5	6	11	+5	0	F
(France) Estelle Duvin	5	5	4	9	+11	2	F
(Slovakia) Barbora Kapičáková	5	4	4	8	+8	4	F
(Slovakia) Nela Lopušanová	5	4	4	8	+8	7	F
(France) Clara Rozier	5	3	5	8	+10	6	F
(Slovakia) Lucia Halušková	5	2	5	7	+2	2	F
(Italy) Nadia Mattivi	5	0	7	7	+2	0	D
(Slovakia) Ema Tóthová	5	2	4	6	+8	0	F
(Italy) Laura Fortino	5	1	5	6	0	0	D

GP = Games played; G = Goals; A = Assists; Pts = Points; +/− = Plus/Minus; PIM = Penalties in Minutes; POS = Position
Source: IIHF.com

==== Goaltending leaders ====
Only the top five goaltenders, based on save percentage, who have played at least 40% of their team's minutes, are included in this list.

Player	TOI	GA	GAA	SA	Sv%	SO
(Hungary) Anikó Németh	300:19	7	1.40	121	94.21	1
(France) Alice Philbert	306:43	8	1.56	132	93.94	0
(Slovakia) Lívia Debnárová	279:10	9	1.93	104	91.35	2
(Norway) Ena Nystrøm	294:19	13	2.65	149	91.28	1
(Italy) Gabriella Durante	271:42	10	2.21	112	91.07	0

TOI = time on ice (minutes:seconds); SA = shots against; GA = goals against; GAA = goals against average; Sv% = save percentage; SO = shutouts
Source: IIHF.com

=== Awards ===
Position	Player
Goaltender	(Hungary) Anikó Németh
Defenceman	(Italy) Nadia Mattivi
Forward	(France) Estelle Duvin

== Group B tournament ==
2026 IIHF Women's World Championship Division I B

Tournament details
- Host country: Spain
- City: Puigcerdà
- Venue: 1 (in 1 host city)
- Dates: 12–18 April
- Teams: 6

Tournament statistics
- Games played: 15
- Goals scored: 81 (5.4 per game)
- Attendance: 2,234 (149 per game)
- Scoring leader: (Netherlands) Maree Dijkema (10 points)

Official website
- Website

=== Participants ===
Team	Qualification
Netherlands	Placed 6th in 2025 Division I A and was relegated.
Latvia	Placed 2nd in 2025 Division I B.
Great Britain	Placed 3rd in 2025 Division I B.
Kazakhstan	Placed 4th in 2025 Division I B.
South Korea	Placed 5th in 2025 Division I B.
Spain	Host, placed 1st in 2025 Division II A and was promoted.

=== Match officials ===
Seven referees and linesperson were selected for the tournament.

Referees	Linesperson
(Canada) Beatrice Fortin; (China) Liu Lu; (Germany) Caroline Butt; (Germany) Harriet Weegh; (France) Eloïse Jure; (Japan) Miyuki Nakayama; (United States) Kaylen Hanson	(China) Zhang Wenxi; (Finland) Aino Ranki; (Hungary) Zóra Gottlibet; (Norway) Anette Fjeldstad; (Slovakia) Eva Moleková; (Ukraine) Anhelina Maifeld; (United States) Amanda Ziola

=== Standings ===
Pos	Team	Pld	W	OTW	OTL	L	GF	GA	GD	Pts	Promotion or relegation
1	Netherlands	5	4	0	1	0	18	4	+14	13	Promoted to the 2027 Division I A
2	Great Britain	5	2	2	1	0	13	9	+4	11	
3	Kazakhstan	5	2	0	1	2	10	14	−4	7 (Note: Kazakhstan 4–3 South Korea)	
4	South Korea	5	2	0	1	2	16	17	−1	7	
5	Latvia	5	0	2	0	3	16	21	−5	4	
6	Spain (H)	5	1	0	0	4	8	16	−8	3	Relegated to the 2027 Division II A

Source: IIHF
Rules for classification: 1) points; 2) head-to-head points; 3) head-to-head goal difference; 4) head-to-head number of goals scored; 5) result against closest best-ranked team outside tied teams; 6) result against second-best ranked team outside tied teams; 7) seeding before tournament.
(H) Host

=== Results ===
All times are local (UTC+2).

12 April 2026; 13:00	South Korea	2–3 GWS (1–0, 1–0, 0–2) (OT: 0–0) (SO: 0–1)	Great Britain	Poliesportiu, Puigcerdà; Attendance: 76

Game reference

Ahn Se-won
Goalies
Nicole Jackson
Referees:
(Canada) Béatrice Fortin
(France) Eloïse Jure
Linesmen:
(Slovakia) Eva Moleková
(China) Zhang Wenxi

Lee E. (Kim N.) – 15:18	1–0
Han – 24:29	2–0
	2–1	40:47 – Adams
	2–2	48:25 – Marsden (Adams) (PP)

Park Ji. (miss)
Han (miss)
Lee E.
Park Jo.
Kim N. (miss)
Shootout
(miss) Adams
Alderson-Smith
Rees
(miss) Gale
Marsden
14 min
Penalties
10 min
33
Shots
25

12 April 2026; 16:30	Kazakhstan	2–3 GWS (1–0, 0–0, 1–2) (OT: 0–0) (SO: 0–1)	Latvia	Poliesportiu, Puigcerdà; Attendance: 66

Game reference

Arina Chshyokolova
Goalies
Kristiāna Apsīte
Referees:
(Japan) Miyuki Nakayama
(Germany) Harriet Weegh
Linesmen:
(Ukraine) Anhelina Maifeld
(United States) Amanda Ziola

Muravyeva (Kutsenko, Meskini) – 06:25	1–0
	1–1	50:05 – Šilajāne (Rulle) (PP)
Shegay (Moldabay, Orazbayeva) (PP) – 52:54	2–1
	2–2	53:53 – Taube (Rulle)

Muravyeva (miss)
Orazbayeva (miss)
Zubkova (miss)
Aldabergenova
Shegay (miss)
Shootout
Rulle
(miss) Yip-Chuck
(miss) Želubovska
A. Apsīte
(miss) Miljone
12 min
Penalties
6 min
33
Shots
40

12 April 2026; 20:00	Spain	0–6 (0–3, 0–2, 0–1)	Netherlands	Poliesportiu, Puigcerdà; Attendance: 223

Game reference

Carolina Moreno
Alba Gonzalo
Goalies
Eline Gabriele
Referees:
(Germany) Caroline Butt
(United States) Kaylen Hanson
Linesmen:
(Norway) Anette Fjeldstad
(Finland) Aino Ranki

0–1	10:21 – Dijkema (Hamers, Zwarthoed) (PP)
0–2	11:16 – Hamers (Visser, Huisman)
0–3	13:18 – Milders (Van Ooijen) (PP)
0–4	24:19 – Dijkema
0–5	33:34 – Hamers (Zwarthoed)
0–6	54:17 – Van Ooijen (Hamers)

18 min
Penalties
8 min
24
Shots
34

13 April 2026; 13:00	Latvia	6–7 (0–1, 4–1, 2–5)	South Korea	Poliesportiu, Puigcerdà; Attendance: 38

Game reference

Kristiāna Apsīte
Goalies
Ahn Se-won
Kim Yeon-ju
Referees:
(France) Eloïse Jure
(Japan) Miyuki Nakayama
Linesmen:
(Hungary) Zóra Gottlibet
(China) Zhang Wenxi

	0–1	08:19 – Song (Han)
	0–2	23:45 – Jang (Kang, Kim D.)
A. Apsīte (Yip-Chuck) – 24:41	1–2
Šilajāne (Rulle) – 29:46	2–2
Rulle (Lagzdiņa, Šilajāne) (PP) – 32:07	3–2
Rulle (Lagzdiņa) – 34:10	4–2
Miljone (Yip-Chuck, Kezika) – 44:16	5–2
	5–3	45:18 – Park Ji. (Kim S., Han) (PP)
	5–4	54:28 – Lee E. (Kim M.)
	5–5	55:05 – Kim N. (Kim T., Lee E.)
Lagzdiņa (Šilajāne, Miljone) – 56:25	6–5
	6–6	56:42 – Park Ji. (Han)
	6–7	56:54 – Kim N. (Park Jo.)

6 min
Penalties
6 min
21
Shots
46

13 April 2026; 16:30	Netherlands	3–0 (1–0, 1–0, 1–0)	Kazakhstan	Poliesportiu, Puigcerdà; Attendance: 71

Game reference

Eline Gabriele
Goalies
Arina Chshyokolova
Referees:
(United States) Kaylen Hanson
(China) Liu Lu
Linesmen:
(Finland) Aino Ranki
(United States) Amanda Ziola

De Jong (Collard, Dijkema) – 13:27	1–0
Milders (Zwarthoed) – 25:44	2–0
Hamers (Seppenwolde, Dijkema) (PP2) – 48:31	3–0

4 min
Penalties
6 min
34
Shots
20

13 April 2026; 20:00	Great Britain	3–2 (3–1, 0–1, 0–0)	Spain	Poliesportiu, Puigcerdà; Attendance: 313

Game reference

Nicole Jackson
Goalies
Carolina Moreno
Referees:
(Canada) Béatrice Fortin
(Germany) Harriet Weegh
Linesmen:
(Ukraine) Anhelina Maifeld
(Slovakia) Eva Moleková

	0–1	05:37 – Bosch (Romero, Sanz)
Marsden (Gale) (PP) – 08:29	1–1
Alderson-Smith (Newlands, Headland) – 11:09	2–1
Endicott – 16:55	3–1
	3–2	32:01 – Fernández (O'Hare)

8 min
Penalties
10 min
24
Shots
25

15 April 2026; 13:00	Netherlands	3–0 (2–0, 1–0, 0–0)	South Korea	Poliesportiu, Puigcerdà; Attendance: 56

Game reference

Eline Gabriele
Goalies
Ahn Se-won
Referees:
(Canada) Béatrice Fortin
(China) Liu Lu
Linesmen:
(Ukraine) Anhelina Maifeld
(China) Zhang Wenxi

Milders (Collard) – 02:08	1–0
Dijkema (de Jong, Huisman) – 17:05	2–0
Zwarthoed (Dijkema) – 28:19	3–0

8 min
Penalties
4 min
29
Shots
23

15 April 2026; 16:30	Latvia	4–3 OT (0–2, 2–0, 1–1) (OT: 1–0)	Great Britain	Poliesportiu, Puigcerdà; Attendance: 74

Game reference

Kristiāna Apsīte
Goalies
Nicole Jackson
Referees:
(Germany) Caroline Butt
(Germany) Harriet Weegh
Linesmen:
(Norway) Anette Fjeldstad
(Slovakia) Eva Moleková

	0–1	10:00 – C. Jackson (Wakeling, Sire)
	0–2	10:22 – Gale (Adams, Traill)
Miljone (Yip-Chuck) – 31:57	1–2
Miljone (Kublina) (PP) – 33:24	2–2
Miljone (Yip-Chuck, Kezika) – 40:48	3–2
	3–3	49:45 – Adams (Marsden)
Rulle (Yip-Chuck) – 63:36	4–3

6 min
Penalties
14 min
43
Shots
24

15 April 2026; 20:00	Spain	2–3 (1–1, 0–1, 1–1)	Kazakhstan	Poliesportiu, Puigcerdà; Attendance: 233

Game reference

Alba Gonzalo
Goalies
Arina Chshyokolova
Referees:
(United States) Kaylen Hanson
(France) Eloïse Jure
Linesmen:
(Finland) Aino Ranki
(Hungary) Zóra Gottlibet

	0–1	16:52 – Filimonova (Butorina, Shegay) (PP2)
P. Giménez (Castellanos) – 17:37	1–1
	1–2	31:39 – Orazbayeva (Shegay, Filimonova) (PP)
Serna (Bosch) (PP) – 41:31	2–2
	2–3	45:18 – Filimonova (Tursynova)

14 min
Penalties
14 min
44
Shots
35

17 April 2026; 13:00	Great Britain	1–0 GWS (0–0, 0–0, 0–0) (OT: 0–0) (SO: 1–0)	Netherlands	Poliesportiu, Puigcerdà; Attendance: 86

Game reference
Nicole Jackson	Goalies	Eline Gabriele	Referees: (Canada) Béatrice Fortin (United States) Kaylen Hanson; Linesmen: (Hungary) Zóra Gottlibet (United States) Amanda Ziola
Beal (miss); Alderson-Smith; Rees; Newlands (miss)	Shootout	(miss) Dijkema; (miss) Hamers; Zwarthoed; (miss) Huisman; (miss) De Jong	Referees: (Canada) Béatrice Fortin (United States) Kaylen Hanson; Linesmen: (Hungary) Zóra Gottlibet (United States) Amanda Ziola
8 min	Penalties	6 min	Referees: (Canada) Béatrice Fortin (United States) Kaylen Hanson; Linesmen: (Hungary) Zóra Gottlibet (United States) Amanda Ziola
22	Shots	28	Referees: (Canada) Béatrice Fortin (United States) Kaylen Hanson; Linesmen: (Hungary) Zóra Gottlibet (United States) Amanda Ziola

17 April 2026; 16:30	Kazakhstan	4–3 (1–0, 2–1, 1–2)	South Korea	Poliesportiu, Puigcerdà; Attendance: 68

Game reference

Arina Chshyokolova
Goalies
Ahn Se-won
Referees:
(Germany) Caroline Butt
(Japan) Miyuki Nakayama
Linesmen:
(Slovakia) Eva Moleková
(China) Zhang Wenxi

Muravyeva (Zubkova) – 01:34	1–0
	1–1	20:23 – Kim N. (Park Jo., Lee E.)
Shegay (SH) – 29:04	2–1
Shegay (Filimonova, Tursynova) (PP) – 39:21	3–1
	3–2	43:17 – Park Ji. (Han, Song)
	3–3	53:49 – Park Jo. (Kim S., Lee E.)
Ashimova (Diundina, Pyatkova) – 59:51	4–3

17 April 2026; 20:00	Latvia	0–3 (0–1, 0–0, 0–2)	Spain	Poliesportiu, Puigcerdà; Attendance: 316

Game reference

Kristiāna Apsīte
Goalies
Carolina Moreno
Referees:
(China) Liu Lu
(Germany) Harriet Weegh
Linesmen:
(Norway) Anette Fjeldstad
(Ukraine) Anhelina Maifeld

0–1	19:55 – Bosch (O'Hare, Fernández)
0–2	51:49 – P. Giménez (Fernández)
0–3	57:19 – Bosch (EN)

4 min
Penalties
8 min
26
Shots
31

18 April 2026; 13:00	Netherlands	6–3 (2–0, 0–2, 4–1)	Latvia	Poliesportiu, Puigcerdà; Attendance: 94

Game reference

Eline Gabriele
Goalies
Kristiāna Apsīte
Referees:
(Canada) Béatrice Fortin
(Japan) Miyuki Nakayama
Linesmen:
(Norway) Anette Fjeldstad
(Hungary) Zóra Gottlibet

Milders – 01:16	1–0
De Jong (Huisman, Dijkema) – 18:43	2–0
	2–1	24:43 – Rulle (PP)
	2–2	36:37 – Yip-Chuck (Miljone)
Zwarthoed (Hamers, Dijkema) – 44:00	3–2
Dijkema (Zwarthoed, De Jong) – 45:07	4–2
Zwarthoed (De Jong) – 54:23	5–2
	5–3	56:24 – Taube (Rulle)
Dijkema (De Jong, Hamers) (EN) – 58:09	6–3

8 min
Penalties
2 min
36
Shots
24

18 April 2026; 16:30	Great Britain	3–1 (1–0, 2–1, 0–0)	Kazakhstan	Poliesportiu, Puigcerdà; Attendance: 58

Game reference

Nicole Jackson
Goalies
Arina Chshyokolova
Referees:
(Germany) Caroline Butt
(China) Liu Lu
Linesmen:
(Ukraine) Anhelina Maifeld
(China) Zhang Wenxi

Alderson-Smith (PP) – 01:52	1–0
Mullen (C. Jackson) – 21:33	2–0
	2–1	36:40 – Orazbayeva (Shegay, Tursynova)
Alderson-Smith (Newlands) – 21:59	3–1

4 min
Penalties
6 min
19
Shots
20

18 April 2026; 20:00	South Korea	4–1 (0–0, 3–1, 1–0)	Spain	Poliesportiu, Puigcerdà; Attendance: 462

Game reference

Ahn Se-won
Goalies
Carolina Moreno
Referees:
(United States) Kaylen Hanson
(France) Eloïse Jure
Linesmen:
(Finland) Aino Ranki
(United States) Amanda Ziola

Kim T. (Lee E., Kim N.) – 26:04	1–0
Park Ji. (Kim M., Han) – 26:55	2–0
	2–1	36:40 – V. Muñoz (Bosch)
Park Jo. (Lee E.) – 29:50	3–1
Lee E. (Park Jo., Kim N.) (PP) – 44:46	4–1

2 min
Penalties
6 min
19
Shots
19

=== Statistics ===
==== Scoring leaders ====
List shows the top skaters sorted by points, then goals.

Player	GP	G	A	Pts	+/−	PIM	POS
(Netherlands) Maree Dijkema	5	5	5	10	+8	4	F
(Latvia) Linda Rulle	5	4	4	8	−2	2	F
(South Korea) Lee Eun-ji	5	3	5	8	+4	0	F
(Netherlands) Kayleigh Hamers	5	3	4	7	+8	4	F
(Netherlands) Julie Zwarthoed	5	3	4	7	+6	0	F
(Latvia) Līga Miljone	5	4	2	6	−3	4	F
(South Korea) Kim Na-yeon	5	3	3	6	+3	2	F
(Kazakhstan) Alexandra Shegay	5	3	3	6	+1	4	F
(Netherlands) Esther de Jong	5	2	4	6	+8	6	F
(South Korea) Han Yu-an	5	1	5	6	0	2	F
(Latvia) Krista Yip-Chuck	5	1	5	6	−3	2	F

GP = Games played; G = Goals; A = Assists; Pts = Points; +/− = Plus/Minus; PIM = Penalties in Minutes; POS = Position
Source: IIHF.com

==== Goaltending leaders ====
Only the top five goaltenders, based on save percentage, who have played at least 40% of their team's minutes, are included in this list.

Player	TOI	GA	GAA	SA	Sv%	SO
(Netherlands) Eline Gabriele	205:03	3	0.61	109	97.25	3
(United Kingdom) Nicole Jackson	313:36	9	1.72	149	93.96	1
(Kazakhstan) Arina Chshyokolova	305:00	13	2.56	165	92.12	0
(Latvia) Kristiāna Apsīte	307:11	19	3.71	168	88.69	0
(Spain) Carolina Moreno	215:48	12	3.34	92	86.96	1

TOI = time on ice (minutes:seconds); SA = shots against; GA = goals against; GAA = goals against average; Sv% = save percentage; SO = shutouts
Source: IIHF.com

=== Awards ===
Position	Player
Goaltender	(United Kingdom) Nicole Jackson
Defenceman	(Spain) Indira Bosch
Forward	(Netherlands) Maree Dijkema
