= Saffron Lane =

English ice hockey player (born 1995)

MBE Saffron Lane
- Born: 28 March 1995 (age 31) Much Wenlock, England
- Height: 164 cm (5 ft 5 in)
- Weight: 79 kg (174 lb; 12 st 6 lb)
- Position: Forward
- Shot: Right
- Played for: Solihull Vixens
- National team: Great Britain
- Playing career: 2005–2024

Saffron Lane MBE (née Allen, born 28 March 1995) is an English ice hockey player and sports therapist. She played for the Solihull Vixens and represented Great Britain for 12 years on the Great Britain women's national ice hockey team. She was captain of the national team from 2019 until her retirement from international level ice hockey in 2023.

== Career ==
Lane became interested in ice hockey by attending Telford Tigers games with her brother. As there no pathway for girls to play ice hockey when she began playing, she played boys ice hockey for the Telford Venom under 16s team. Lane then played for the Telford Wrekin Raiders women's team from when she was aged 11. She graduated to the Great Britain women's national under-18 ice hockey team.

While attending William Brookes School in Shropshire, Lane was an Olympic Games Youth Ambassador and was chosen to carry the Olympic Torch when it passed through Shropshire en route to London for the 2012 Summer Olympics. She attended the University of Gloucestershire.

From 2012, Kane played for the Solihull Vixens women's team. From 2016 to 2019, she was both a player and an assistant coach for the team. Solihull Vixens won the Women's National Ice Hockey Elite League (WNIHL Elite) championships in 2017, 2020, 2022 and 2023.

Alongside her ice hockey career, Lane worked as a self-employed sports therapist.

=== Great Britain ===
In 2011, Lane made her debut for the Great Britain women's national ice hockey team against Denmark at the IIHF Women’s World Championship Division II in Caen, France. She scored her first senior goal in the tournament, against France.

In November 2012, Lane suffered a serious spinal injury and slipped two discs while playing in an Olympics qualifying tournament in China. Through rehab, she recovered back to fitness within 14 months to play at 2013 Winter Universiade in Pergine Valsugana, Italy, where she scored against the United States and Spain. In 2013, she was awarded the British Olympic Association (BOA) Athlete of the Year award for ice hockey.

Lane was named alternate captain in 2016 and became captain in 2019.

In 2022, Lane represented Greet Britain at the 2022 IIHF Women's World Championship Division II, where Great Britain won the Group A tournament and were promoted to Division I.

Lane retired from international level ice hockey in 2023. While a member of the women's national team Lane represented Great Britain in nine World Championships and three Olympic qualifiers, and scored 18 goals with 20 assists for 38 points. She continued to play for Solihull Vixens until 2024.

Lane was appointed a Member of the Order of the British Empire (MBE) for her Services to Sport in 2025.
