= Estelle Duvin =

French ice hockey player (born 1997)

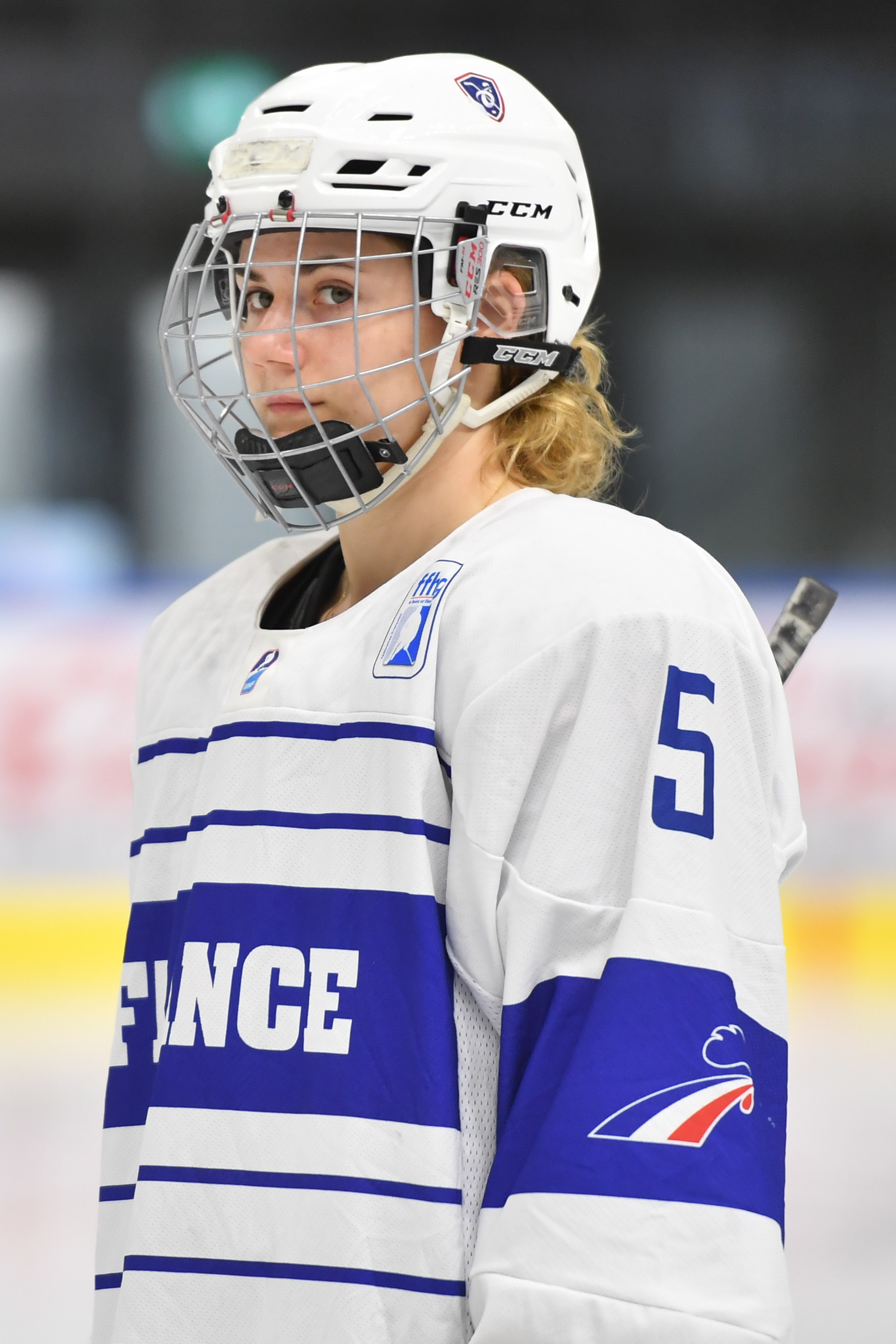
- Duvin with the French national team in 2017
- Born: 1 February 1997 (age 29) Coudekerque-Branche, France
- Height: 1.71 m (5 ft 7 in)
- Weight: 65 kg (143 lb; 10 st 3 lb)
- Position: Centre
- Shoots: Right
- PFWL team Former teams: SC Bern: TPS Turku; Bisonnes de Neuilly-sur-Marne
- National team: France
- Playing career: 2011–present

Estelle Duvin (born 1 February 1997) is a French ice hockey player. She is a centre for SC Bern of the Swiss Women's League (PFWL) and member of the French national team.

== Playing career ==
Duvin attended the University of Maine, but was unable to play for the Black Bears due to differences in the French and American school systems. She spent the year training before moving to the Université de Montréal.

In her debut with the Montreal Carabins women's ice hockey program on 16 October 2016, a 5–1 victory over the Concordia Singers, Duvin recorded an assist. She recorded her first U Sports goal on 30 October, in a 5–2 victory also against Concordia.

Entering the 2020–21 season, Duvin and international teammate Lara Escudero searched for a team that would sign both of them. After inquiring to clubs across Europe, the two Frenchwomen secured contracts with TPS Turku of the Finnish Naisten Liiga (NSML).

Duvin returned to TPS for the 2021–22 season. Following an incident on 26 September 2021 where teammate Maija Otamo cross-checked Ilves forward Emilia Varpula in the head, rendering Varpula unconscious, Duvin was involved in an altercation with Elli Suoranta, and both were suspended for one game.

Moving to EV Bomo Thun of the Swiss Women's League (PFWL) for the 2022–23 season, Duvin recorded 47 points in 23 games and was named the league's best forward.

In the 2023–24 season, Duvin led the PFWL with 35 goals and 67 points in 28 games, earning the titles of best forward and league MVP. She signed a one-year extension with the club on 24 January 2024.

Playing for SC Bern in the 2024–25 season, Duvin repeated as league MVP after producing 23 goals and 54 points in 28 games.

== International play ==
At the 2015 World U18 Championship Division IA, Duvin led France to a gold medal with nine goals and 13 points in five games, the best marks in the tournament.

Duvin represented France at the IIHF Women's World Championship in 2019 and 2023.

At the 2022 World Championship Division IA, Duvin recorded a goal and three points in a 4–1 victory over Norway to secure promotion to the top division.

In the 2024 World Championship Division IA, Duvin earned the directorate award for best forward with a tournament-leading 10 points in five games.

The following year, Duvin recorded four goals and nine points, including a hat-trick in an 8–1 victory over the Netherlands to open the event. Her tournament-leading scoring earned her best forward honors for the second consecutive year.

Duvin made her Olympic debut on 5 February 2026, also the first game for France in women's ice hockey at the Olympics. She wore number 12 and logged 22:26 of ice time.

== Career statistics ==
=== Regular season and playoffs ===
			Regular season					Playoffs
Season	Team	League	GP	G	A	Pts	PIM	GP	G	A	Pts	PIM
2011–12	Bisonnes de Neuilly-sur-Marne	France	10	5	6	11	6	—	—	—	—	—
2012–13	Bisonnes de Neuilly-sur-Marne	France	12	26	7	33	10	2	4	3	7	2
2013–14	Bisonnes de Neuilly-sur-Marne	France	8	15	4	19	26	—	—	—	—	—
2014–15	Pôle France Féminin	FRA U18 2 (Men's)	19	5	12	17	18	2	1	0	1	2
2016–17	Université de Montréal	RSEQ	16	5	4	9	12	—	—	—	—	—
2017–18	Université de Montréal	RSEQ	20	2	8	10	18	6	1	3	4	2
2018–19	Université de Montréal	RSEQ	18	6	10	16	40	4	1	2	3	2
2019–20	Université de Montréal	RSEQ	19	4	6	10	39	—	—	—	—	—
2020–21	TPS Turku	NSML	27	22	22	44	81	2	0	0	0	2
2021–22	TPS Turku	NSML	26	31	26	57	65	7	7	4	11	6
2022–23	EV Bomo Thun	SWHL A	23	20	27	47	37	8	5	7	12	4
2023–24	SC Bern	SWHL A	28	35	32	67	18	8	2	6	8	12
2024–25	SC Bern	SWHL A	28	23	31	54	30	6	4	8	12	8
SWHL A totals			79	78	90	168	85	22	11	21	32	24

=== International ===
Year	Team	Event	Result	GP	G	A	Pts	PIM
2013	France	U18 (Div I)	3rd place, bronze medalist(s)	5	1	2	3	8
2013	France	WC (Div IB)	1st place, gold medalist(s)	5	1	0	1	6
2014	France	WC (Div IA)	4th	5	0	3	3	10
2015	France	U18 (Div I)	1st place, gold medalist(s)	5	9	4	13	6
2015	France	WC (Div IA)	3rd place, bronze medalist(s)	5	1	3	4	8
2016	France	WC (Div IA)	2nd place, silver medalist(s)	5	2	0	2	4
2017	France	WC (Div IA)	6th	5	0	0	0	2
2018	France	WC (Div IA)	1st place, gold medalist(s)	5	3	2	5	2
2019	France	WC	10th	5	1	2	3	4
2022	France	WC (Div IA)	1st place, gold medalist(s)	4	3	5	8	4
2023	France	WC	10th	4	2	2	4	2
2024	France	WC (Div IA)	3rd place, bronze medalist(s)	5	4	4	8	4
2025	France	WC (Div IA)	4th	5	4	5	9	4
2026	France	OG	10th	4	1	1	2	0
2026	France	WC (Div IA)	4th	5	5	4	9	2
Junior totals				10	10	6	16	14
Senior totals				62	27	31	58	52

== Awards and honours ==
Award	Year	Ref
NSML
First Team All-Star	2021, 2022	
Marianne Ihalainen Award	2022	
SWHL A
Best Forward	2023, 2024	
Most Valuable Player	2024	
International
World U18 Championship (Div I) – Best Forward	2015	
World Championship (Div IA) – Best Forward	2024	
