= Swindon Top Cats =

Ice hockey team from Wiltshire, England

- Founded: 1990
- League: Women's Premier Ice Hockey League
- Based in: Swindon, Wiltshire, England
- Arena: Link Centre, Swindon
- Colours: Black, White & Red
- Head coach: Rebecca Osman
- Manager: Michael Armstrong
- Captain: Louise Fisher
- Website: www.swindontopcats.org.uk

Swindon Topcats are a ladies ice hockey club based in Swindon, Wiltshire, England. They are located at the Link Centre in Swindon.

== Overview ==
The club operates two teams: the Topcats, playing in the British Women's Leagues premier division and the Junior Topcats playing in the U16 Girls South Division.

The Swindon TopCats were formed in 1990 by Bob Townsend and entered Division One South for the 1990–1991 season. The girls had an amazing first year and gained promotion to the Premier League, Britain's top division, where they remained for 14 years until a cruel 1–0 defeat in the relegation playoff sent them back down for the 2005–2006 season. However at the end of the 07/08 season the Topcats gained promotion back into the Premier League after a perfect season and slaughtering their way through the promotional playoffs.

The topcats team colours are Red and White with the head of a lion in the middle.

For the 09/10 season the Topcats adopted a third strip, Blue and White with the usual logo in the middle, which they wore at the Friendship Tournament.

== British Women's Friendship Tournament ==
Since its beginning in 1995, Swindon has played host to the British Women's Ice Hockey Friendship Tournament. Throughout its history the Topcats have won their tournament three times and been runners-up four times.

== U16 Girls Team ==
In 2009 the Topcats formed their own U16 Girls Team. They plan to give a different, more original appropriate name for this newly formed team. Swindon Junior Topcats are an U16 Girls ice hockey club based in Swindon, Wiltshire, United Kingdom. They play at the Link Centre in Swindon.
