= École secondaire Étienne-Brûlé =

École secondaire Étienne Brûlé
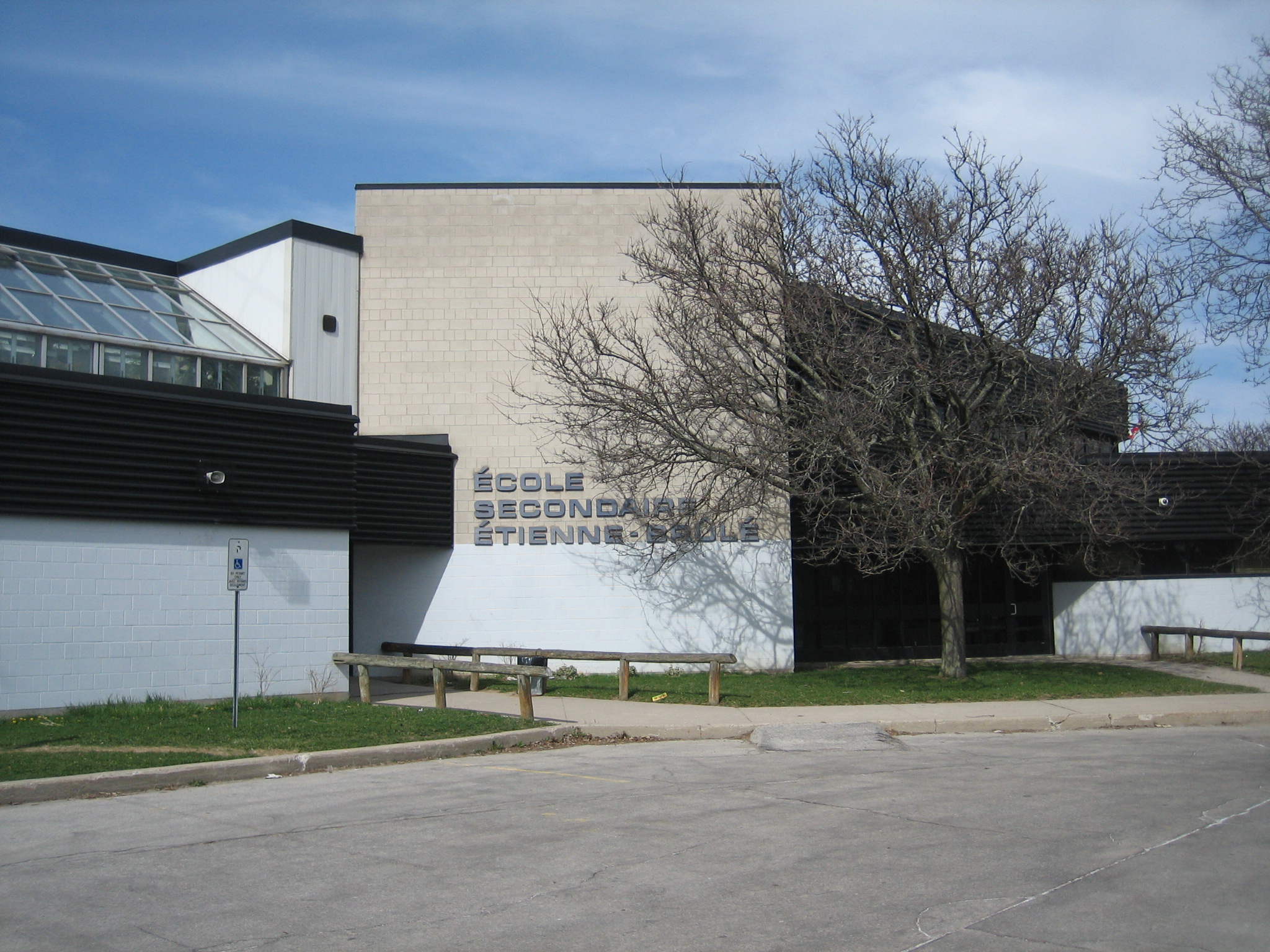

Location
- 300 Banbury Rd; Toronto, Ontario, M2L 2V3; Canada; 43°45′08″N 79°22′17″W

Information
- School type: Public High school
- Motto: Unité dans la diversité (Unity in diversity)
- Religious affiliation: Secular
- Founded: 1969
- School board: Conseil scolaire Viamonde
- School number: 907588
- Principal: Vicky Fauteux (2025–)
- Grades: 7–12
- Language: French
- Website: etiennebrule.csviamonde.ca

École secondaire Étienne-Brûlé (French pronunciation: [ekɔl səɡɔ̃dɛʁ etjɛn bʁyle]) is a French-language public high school located in Toronto, Ontario, Canada, named for a famous explorer of the same name. Part of the Conseil scolaire Viamonde, the school serves the French population of the Greater Toronto Area (GTA).

It is featured in the NFB documentary Une école sans frontières (A School Without Borders) by Nadine Valcin and the third season of reality TV show Comment devenir adulte.

== History ==
In 1969, École secondaire Étienne-Brûlé was founded. It was part of the Conseil scolaire de district du Centre-Sud-Ouest during the late 2000s. Étienne-Brûlé is currently the only public secular French-language secondary school in the North York region, and the only Conseil Scolaire Viamonde school in Toronto offering the Advanced Placement programme.

== Notable alumni ==
- Frank Baylis
- Marjolaine Boutin-Sweet
- Patrick Chan
- Rose Cossar
- Shady El Nahas
- Chantal Hébert
- Paul Poirier
- Marie-Pierre Pelissou

== See also ==
- Education in Ontario
- List of secondary schools in Ontario
