= 2027 IIHF Women's World Championship =

2027 edition of the Women's Ice Hockey World Championship

Tournament details
- Host country: Canada
- City: Quebec City
- Venue: 1 (in 1 host city)
- Dates: November 3–14
- Teams: 10

The 2027 IIHF Women's World Championship will be the 26th edition of the Top Division of the Women's Ice Hockey World Championship organized by the International Ice Hockey Federation (IIHF). The tournament will be played in Quebec City, Canada in from November 3 to 14, 2027.

== Host selection ==
Canada was allocated 5 women's ice hockey championships by the IIHF from 2026 to 2030. This was announced with the confirmation that this included the 2026 Women's World Championship. It was announced later in 2025 that Quebec City, in partnership with event management company Gestev, would host the 2027 tournament. This will be the tenth time Canada hosted the tournament.

== Participants ==
Participants were determined by the previous edition.

Qualification	Host	Dates	Vacancies	Qualified
Top nine in 2026	(Denmark) Esbjerg / Herning	6–16 November 2026	9	United States; Canada; Sweden; Finland; Germany; Switzerland; Czechia; Denmark; Austria
Promoted from Division I	(Hungary) Budapest	12–18 April 2026	1	France

== Venue ==
The tournament will be held at Centre Vidéotron in Quebec City, with some practices taking place at Pavillon Guy-Lafleur. This will be the first time a Women's World Championship has been played in this arena. The Centre Vidéotron was opened in 2015 and is the home of the Quebec Remparts. It is the 18th-largest ice hockey arena in North America.
