= Solihull Vixens =

English women's ice hockey club

Solihull Vixens are a women's ice hockey club based in Solihull. The Vixens compete in the Women's National Ice Hockey Elite League (WNIHL Elite), the highest level of women's ice hockey competition in England. The Vixens play out of Planet Ice, Solihull.

== History ==
Solihull Vixens have won the WNIHL Elite championship in 2017, 2020, 2022, 2023 and 2025.

== Notable players ==
- Jodie Alderson-Smith
- Saffron Lane
