= Coventry Phoenix =

Ice hockey team in Coventry, England

- City: Coventry, England
- League: WNIHL 2 (South)
- Division: Division One (South)
- Founded: 2004
- Home arena: SkyDome Arena, Coventry; Capacity: 2800; Ice size: 58m x 28x
- Colours: Purple, black, white and orange
- Head coach: Steve Lynas
- Captain: Jennifer Adams
- Website: https://www.facebook.com/CoventryPhoenixHockey/

Coventry Phoenix are Coventry's female ice hockey team. The team was established in 2003, and currently competes in Division One (South) of the British Women's Leagues. They play out of the SkyDome Arena, in the centre of Coventry, the same venue as the Coventry Blaze men's professional ice hockey teams.

== History ==
The Phoenix had their best season ever in 2013/14 finishing runners up to Whitley Bay. They made their first appearance at the women's playoffs in Sheffield losing 1–0 to the eventual winner, Swindon Top Cats, in the Semi Final. They then beat Cardiff to finish on 3rd place overall.

The Club ran a series of free "Learn to Play" sessions, providing loanable kits, in the summer of 2014, and again in partnership with Willies in 2025.
