= Coventry Blaze NIHL =

Ice hockey team in West Midlands, England

- City: Coventry, West Midlands
- League: NIHL Division 2 North
- Founded: 2007
- Home arena: Coventry Skydome
- Colors: Black, dark/light blue & white
- Head coach: Sean Alderson
- Captain: Daniel Kent
- Affiliate: Coventry Blaze

Franchise history
- 2007 – 2012: Coventry Blaze (ENL)
- 2012 – Present: Coventry NIHL Blaze

The Coventry Blaze NIHL are a British ice hockey team based in Coventry, England. They are the NIHL affiliate of Coventry Blaze of the EIHL. The team started life as the Coventry Blaze (ENL) in 2007, changing their name to the Coventry Blaze NIHL ahead of the 2012–13 season. The team often provides many juniors competitive ice time. The team withdrew from the 2019–20 season, after being unable to replace the players that had left during the off-season, returning to NIHL action ahead of the 2020–21 season.

== Season-by-season record ==
Season	League	GP	W	T	L	OTW	OTL	Pts.	Rank	Post Season
2007-08	ENL	16	9	0	7	-	-	18	5	Did not make playoffs
2008-09	ENL	28	11	4	13	-	-	26	4	Semifinal loss
2009-10	ENL	28	11	6	11	-	-	28	4	Playoffs qualifier loss
2010-11	ENL	28	15	2	11	-	-	32	3	Final loss
2011-12	ENL	32	11	4	17	-	-	26	6	Did not make playoffs
2012-13	NIHL 1	32	6	5	21	-	-	17	8	Placement game win
2013-14	NIHL 2	28	16	2	10	-	-	34	3	Semifinal loss
2014-15	NIHL 2	36	8	4	24	-	-	20	8	No playoffs held
2015-16	NIHL 2	28	4	1	23	-	-	9	7	Did not make playoffs
2016-17	NIHL 2	28	2	2	24	-	-	6	8	Did not make playoffs
2017-18	NIHL 2	36	10	-	20	2	3	28	8	Did not make playoffs
2018-19	NIHL 2	32	13	-	16	1	2	30	6	Did not make playoffs
2020-21	NIHL 2									

== Club roster 2020–21 ==
Netminders
No.	Nat.	Player	Catches	Date of birth	Place of birth	Acquired	Contract

Defencemen
No.	Nat.	Player	Shoots	Date of birth	Place of birth	Acquired	Contract

Forwards
No.	Nat.	Player	Shoots	Date of birth	Place of birth	Acquired	Contract

== 2020/21 Outgoing ==
Outgoing
No.	Nat.	Player	Shoots	Date of birth	Place of birth	Leaving For
