= Link Centre =

Leisure centre in Swindon, England

- 'Link' or 'The Link'
- The Link Centre Logo

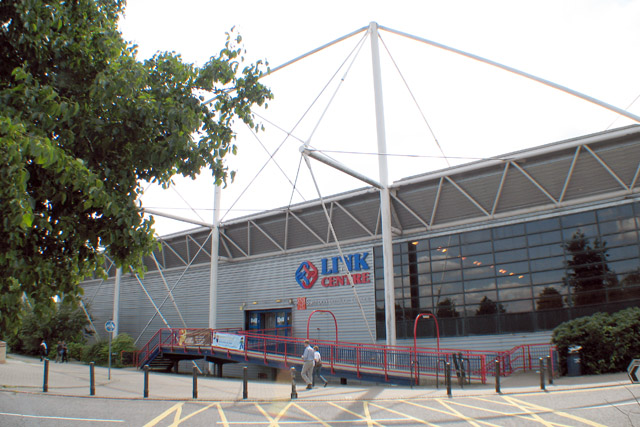
- Entrance to the Link Centre, northeast side
- Interactive map of Link Centre
- Full name: The Link Centre
- Location: Swindon, Wiltshire, England
- Coordinates: 51.5588°N 1.8309°W
- Owner: Swindon Borough Council
- Operator: Greenwich Leisure
- Field size: 56x26m (rink), 25m (pool)

Construction
- Groundbreaking: 1983
- Built: 1984
- Renovated: 2012
- Cost: £9,500,000 (approx.)
- Architect: K P Sherry

Tenant
- Swindon Wildcats (Ice Hockey) Swindon Dolphins (Swimming)

Website
- www.better.org.uk/leisure-centre/swindon/the-link-centre

The Link Centre is a leisure centre in Swindon, England. The building, owned by Swindon Borough Council and operated by Greenwich Leisure under the brand "Better", is best known for its national-sized ice rink which houses a National Ice Hockey League team, the Swindon Wildcats.

== Location ==
The building is part of the West Swindon district centre, in Westlea, about 2 miles (3.2 km) west of Swindon town centre. The complex includes a large Asda supermarket as well as many smaller shops

== History ==
The centre was commissioned by Thamesdown Borough Council (later renamed Swindon Borough Council) in 1970 to provide leisure and social facilities for an estimated West Swindon population of 50,000. Design was undertaken in-house under chief architect K P Sherry, and work began on the site in 1983.

The modern, multi-axial design incorporating an ice rink, swimming pool and other facilities opened in April 1985, received an estimated 1 million visitors in its first year of operation and "won awards and favourable mentions in architectural circles". The complex, designed to provide facilities for more than 20 sports and leisure activities, was described in architectural and sports journals as the most comprehensive development of its kind in Britain.

The £2million ice rink was praised on completion but local residents were unhappy that the swimming pool, at only 25 metres long, was not of competition standard.

In 2003, the centre was closed temporarily following the finding of the legionella bacteria in the water cooling system. This bacteria, found during a routine test, is the cause of Legionnaires' disease. The centre re-opened following a full sterilisation of the water supply. In 2006, the metal-exterior centre was closed for a short time after a major electrical fault was caused by an internal flood.

== Facilities ==
- Ice rink

The international-sized (56mx26m) ice pad is recognised as a "centre of excellence" for both figure skating and ice hockey. It is an approved national centre for squad training for British Ice Skating and Ice Hockey UK, and a NISA approved regional test centre.

- 25m deck-level heated swimming pool
- Gym with over 100 stations and Astroturf area
- Dedicated spin studio
- Two fitness class studios
- 1,100 square metre trampoline park (Better Extreme)
- Squash courts
- Library

== Ice hockey teams ==
A number of ice hockey teams play at the Link Centre, including:

- Swindon Wildcats
- Swindon Wildcats 2
- Swindon Top Cats
- Swindon Steelhawks
