= Marie-Pierre Pelissou =

French-Canadian ice hockey player (born 1995)

- Born: 31 August 1995 (age 31) Montreal, Quebec, Canada
- Height: 1.73 m (5 ft 8 in)
- Weight: 69 kg (152 lb; 10 st 12 lb)
- Position: Defense
- Shoots: Left
- team Former teams: HC Davos; SC Bern Frauen; Laurentian Voyageurs; Queen's Gaels
- National team: France
- Playing career: 2010–present

Marie-Pierre Pelissou (born 31 August 1995) is a French-Canadian ice hockey player. She is a member of the France women's national ice hockey team that participated in women's ice hockey tournament at the 2026 Winter Olympics.

== Playing career ==
=== College ===
Pelissou played four seasons of college ice hockey. Her first season was spent with the Queen's Golden Gaels, followed by three seasons with the Laurentian Voyageurs women's ice hockey program in the OUA conference of U SPORTS. Through her four seasons, she amassed 21 points.

=== International ===
Pelissou played for France at the 2023 IIHF Women's World Championships in Brampton, Ontario, Canada.

Making her Olympic debut on 5 February 2026, also the first game for France in women's ice hockey at the Olympics, Pelissou, wearing number 13, logged 22:35 of ice time.

== Personal life ==
Pelissou was born in Canada to a French father and Canadian mother, and holds dual citizenship. She attended high school at École secondaire Étienne-Brûlé.
