= Women's Premier League (Solomon Islands) =

- Founded: 2020
- First season: 2020
- Country: Solomon Islands
- Confederation: OFC (Oceania)
- Divisions: 1
- Number of clubs: 8
- Level on pyramid: 1
- Current: 2026 Women's Premier League (Solomon Islands)

The Women's Premier League, also known as the Solrais Women's Premier League due to sponsorship reasons with local rice distributor Solrais, is the top-flight women's football league in the Solomon Islands.

== History ==
The Solomon Islands Football Federation launched the inaugural season of the Women's Premier League in August 2020 with local rice distributor Solrais as the league's title sponsor amidst the COVID-19 pandemic. This the first women's competition of its kind organized by the country's federation which plans a women's national team to regularly compete in competitions in Oceania by 2023 when the league is projected to be on its third season. The first season which is planned to be held until November 2020 was pioneered by eight teams; Koloale FC, Solright FC, Frigates United, RSIPF, Haura FC, Marist FC, Naha FC and Renbel Ibis.
