= Women's National Ice Hockey Elite League =

Womenʼs ice hockey league in England

- Current season, competition or edition: 2025/2026
- Sport: Ice hockey
- No. of teams: 6
- Region: United Kingdom
- Continent: Europe
- Most recent champion: Solihull Vixens (2024/2025)
- Most titles: Solihull Vixens
- Website: www.eliteleague.co.uk

The Womenʼs National Ice Hockey Elite League (WNIHL Elite) is a womenʼs ice hockey league in England. It is the highest level of women's ice hockey competition in England and is part of the broader Women's National Ice Hockey League (WNIHL) structure. It is administered by the English Ice Hockey Association.

The league currently consists of one division of six teams and the teams face each other multiple times throughout each season: twice home, twice away. The season runs from September to May each year, which each team competing to be crowned champions at the WNIHL Championship weekend in May. The first Championship weekend was held in 2016.

== Teams ==
- Bracknell Queen Bees
- Bristol Huskies
- Guildford Lightning
- Solihull Vixens
- Streatham Storm
- Whitley Bay Beacons

=== Champions ===
- 2015/16 – Bracknell Queen Bees
- 2016/17 – Solihull Vixens
- 2017/18 – Bracknell Queen Bees
- 2018/19 – Bracknell Queen Bees
- 2019/20 – Solihull Vixens
- 2021/22 – Solihull Vixens
- 2022/23 – Solihull Vixens
- 2023/24 – Bracknell Queen Bees
- 2024/25 – Solihull Vixens

== See also ==
- Women's ice hockey in Great Britain
- Great Britain women's national ice hockey team
