= Eloïse Jure =

French ice hockey player (born 2001)

- Born: 5 April 2001 (age 24) Saint-Martin-d'Hères, France
- Height: 1.63 m (5 ft 4 in)
- Weight: 60 kg (132 lb; 9 st 6 lb)
- Position: Defense
- Shoots: Left
- FFHG FÉ team Former teams: Grenoble; Pôle France Féminin; Montreal Carabins
- National team: France
- Playing career: 2016–present

Eloïse Jure (born 5 April 2001) is a French ice hockey player for Grenoble in the FFHG Féminin Élite.

== International play ==
As a junior player with the French national under-18 team, she participated in four IIHF U18 Women's World Championships – the Top Division tournament in 2016, the Division I Group A tournament in 2017, and the Division I Group B tournaments in 2018 and 2019.

She made her debut with the French senior national team at the Group A tournament of the 2018 IIHF Women's World Championship Division I, where she recorded her first national team point, the primary assist on a Chloé Aurard goal against Austria. Jure also represented France at the 2019 IIHF Women's World Championship.
