= Bracknell Queen Bees =

Ice hockey team in Berkshire, England

Bracknell Queen Bees IHC
- City: Bracknell, Berkshire, England
- League: Women's National Ice Hockey Premier League
- Founded: 1987
- Home arena: Slough Ice Arena; Capacity: 1000; Ice size: 56m x 26m
- Colours: Gold, black
- Head coach: Chrissy Newman, Katherine Gale & Louise Adams

Queen Bees IHC is a women's ice hockey club based in Slough, Berkshire, England. They play at the Slough Ice Arena, having previously played at the John Nike Leisuresport Complex in Bracknell.

The club operates three teams, which compete in various levels of the EIHA's Women's National Ice Hockey League (WNIHL):

The Queen Bees compete in the WNIHL Elite.

The Fire Bees compete in the WNIHL League.

The Ice Bees compete in the WNIHL Division U16 South.

The Queen Bees club was founded in November 1987, when the rink at Bracknell opened. It has supplied players for the GB ice or inline / skater hockey teams in most years since. The Firebees team was formed later as a development squad in September 2005, entering Division 1 for its maiden season in 2006 after 6 friendlies. In 2007 the Ice Bees were formed, specifically for girls under 16.

In July 2020, after having been shut for 4 months due to the COVID-19 pandemic, the team's home rink in Bracknell was permanently closed. This forced the relocation of the Queen Bees team to Slough Ice Arena, where they play to this day.

All teams play in the same strip. Previously the Queen Bees played in black and gold (away) or black and white (home) horizontal stripes. To conform with new league rules the strip was altered in 2006, but the club colours of black and gold remain the same.

The head coach is Chrissy Newman, assisted player-coaches Katherine Gale and Louise Adams.

== History ==
=== The Queen Bees ===
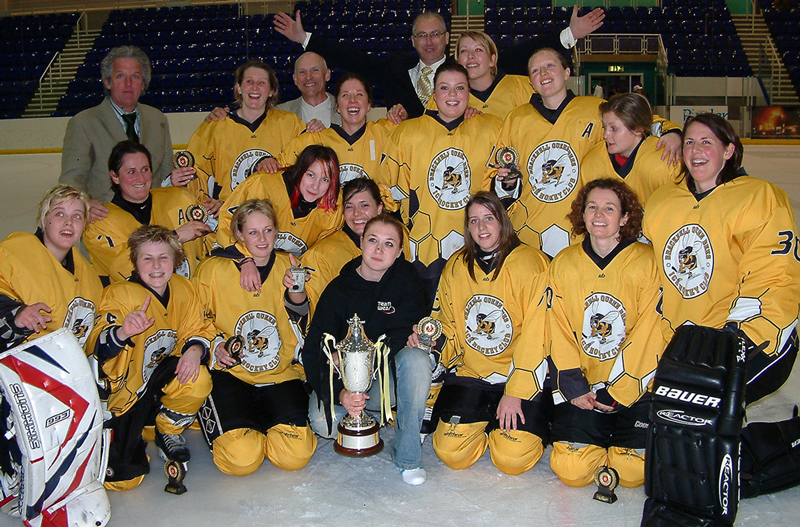
Bracknell Queen Bees 2006/07 Playoff Champions

1988–89 The Queen Bees first season. They entered the Capital League and finished in 3rd place.

Great Britain Representatives: Julie Biles, Rachel Cotton and Claire Pannell.

1989–90 The Capital League was changed to the Southern Division. The Queen Bees finished in 3rd place.

1990–91 A change again introduced the inaugural season of the EIHA Women's Premier Division (WPL) with the top two teams from each division from the 1989-90 season were invited to form this league. Chelmsford Cobras, however, who finished 2nd in our division, declined to move up to the Premier Division and the Queen Bees were offered the opportunity instead and took it.

In the WPL the Queen Bees finished 2nd to Oxford City Rockets. Claire Pannell finished 5th in the leading Scorers table and Karen Hare finished as 2nd leading netminder.

With this new higher division formulated the playoffs set-up was changed to the format that exists today. The first playoff final was between the Queen Bees and the Oxford City Rockets. Unfortunately Oxford beat the Queen Bees 5-1, to secure the double, achieving both League and Playoff Champions.

Great Britain Representatives: Julie Biles, Rachel Cotton, Kathy Nike and Claire Pannell.

1991–92 The Queen Bees again finished 2nd to Oxford City Rockets in the WPL. and again faced Oxford in the playoff final. At the end of regulation time and sudden death overtime the score ended 1–1. The final went to penalties and after 2 rounds of penalty shots the final result to Oxford 3–1.

1992–93 The Queen Bees finished 2nd in the WPL and for the third year running faced Oxford City Rockets in the playoff final. Oxford went on to beat the Queen Bees 4–0.

1993–94 This season saw the Queen Bees crowned league champions. In the playoffs the Queen Bees became double champions beating beat the Slough Phantoms 7–2.

1994–95 The Queen Bees finished 3rd in the WPL

Netminder Karen Hare was top goalie in the league. Great Britain Representatives: Rachel Cotton, Lisa Davies, Jeanette Mountjoy and Kathy Nike.

1995–96 The Queen Bees finished 2nd in the league.

Great Britain Representatives: Becky Bowles, Rachel Cotton, Lisa Davies, Jeanette Mountjoy, Kim Strongman and Claire Pannell.

1996–97 The Queen Bees finished 2nd in the league. In the playoffs the Queen Bees lost to the Sunderland Scorpions (score unknown)

1997–98 The Queen Bees finished 2nd in the WPL. In the playoffs the Queen Bees lost to the Sunderland Scorpions (score unknown)

Great Britain Representatives: Verity Boome, Vicky Burton, Laura Byrne, Rachelle Kyffin and Kim Strongman.

1998–99 The Queen Bees finished 3rd in the WPL. In the playoffs the Queen Bees finished 4th losing to Slough in the semi-finals and then Guildford in the Bronze medal game.

1999–2000 This season unfortunately, began with the Queen Bees losing three of their international players for most of the season. Kim Strongman emigrated to Canada, Claire Pannell fell pregnant and Laura Byrne also went to Canada.

The Queen Bees finished 5th in the WPL and for the first time did not qualify for the playoff finals.

Great Britain Representatives: Vicky Burton, Laura Byrne and Sam Cheetham.

During the 2000-01 season, the Bracknell Queen Bees added several new senior players and younger recruits, resulting in a squad with ages ranging from 6 to 30 years.

The Queen Bees finished 2nd in the WPL.

In the playoff finals the Queen Bees finished in 3rd beating Sunderland Scorpions 3–1 in the bronze medal game.

Great Britain Representatives: Vicky Burton, Laura Byrne, Heather Brunning and Amy Johnson.

2001–02 The Queen Bees finish 4th in the WPL.

In the playoff finals the Queen Bees finished 3rd beating Cardiff Comets in the bronze medal game.

In the Swindon Tournament the Queen Bees finished 2nd losing to Cardiff on penalty shots in the final.

Great Britain Representatives: Vicky Burton, Laura Byrne, Heather Brunning.

Queen Bees players selected to the newly formed England squad: Sam Bidmead, Rhian Hayes, Claire Pannell and Laura Stark.

Queen Bees players representing Wales: Sam Cheetham and Heather Brunning.

GB Roller/Skater/Inline representatives: Sam Bonathan, Heather Brunning, Sam Cheetham and Laura Stark.

2002–03 The Queen Bees finished 6th in the WPL.

In the inaugural EIHA Knockout Cup competition the Queen Bees reached the final and beat the Swindon Topcats 4–1 to claim the silverware.

In the Swindon Tournament the Queen Bees finished 3rd

Great Britain Representatives: Vicky Burton and Heather Brunning

Wales representatives: Sam Cheetham and Heather Brunning

GB Roller/Skater/Inline representatives: Sam Bonathan, Heather Brunning, Sam Cheetham and Laura Stark.

2003–04 The Queen Bees finished 7th in the WPL

In the EIHA Knockout Cup competition the Queen Bees reached the quarter-finals losing to Solihull Vixens on penalty shots.

In the Swindon Tournament the Queen Bees finished as tournament champions beating Swindon 3–0 in the final.

Great Britain Representatives: Heather Brunning

Wales representatives: Sam Cheetham and Heather Brunning.

GB Roller/Skater/Inline representatives: Sam Bonathan and Laura Stark.

2004–05 The Queen Bees finished 3rd in the WPL.

The Queen Bees became the playoff champions beating Sunderland 1–0 in the final.

In the EIHA Knockout Cup the Queen Bees became double champions beating Swindon 8–2 in the final.

In the Swindon Tournament the Queen Bees finished 2nd losing to Cardiff on sudden-death penalty shots in the final.

Wales representatives: Sam Cheetham and Heather Brunning.

This season the EIHA set up a Southern Conference team. Queen Bees representatives were Sam Bonathan, Sam Bidmead, Jenni Jones, Lydia Westcombe, Dani Summers, Amy Lack, Chrissy Newman, Laura Stark

EIHA U16's School of Excellence: Dani Summers

GB Roller/Skater/Inline representatives: Sam Bonathan and Laura Stark.

2005–06 The Queen Bees finished 2nd in the WPL

In the playoffs (renamed- The Bill Britton Memorial Cup) the Queen Bees finished 3rd beating Slough Phantoms 8–0

The Queen Bees were EIHA Knockout Cup competition Semi-finalists

In the Swindon Tournament the Queen Bees finished 2nd losing to Cardiff Comets on sudden-death penalty shots in the final.

Wales representatives: Sam Cheetham and Heather Brunning.

England Senior team representatives: Sam Bonathan, Alex von Haselberg-Palyvou, Lydia Westcombe, Jenni Jones,

England U16 team representatives: Natalie Aldridge (U16), Amanda Carr (U16)

Southern Conference representatives: Sam Bonathan, Natalie Aldridge (U16), Jenni Jones, Lydia Westcombe, Dani Summers (U16), Amy Lack, Chrissy Newman, Laura Stark, Amanda Carr (U16), Alex von Haselberg-Palyvou

GB Roller/Skater/Inline representatives: Natalie Aldridge, Sam Bonathan and Laura Stark.

Queen Bees set up a development squad for the first season. This new team accepted to play in Division One South as the Fire Bees for 2006–07 season

2006–07 The Queen Bees finished 2nd in the WPL.

In the playoffs (Bill Britton Memorial Cup) the Queen Bees became champions beating the Newcastle Lady Vipers 2–1 in the final

In the EIHA Knockout Cup the Queen Bees became double champions beating Solihull Vixens 5–0 in the final

In the Swindon Tournament the Queen Bees finished 3rd

Great Britain representatives: Alex von Haselberg-Palyvou

Great Britain U18 representatives: Natalie Aldridge, Amanda Carr, Dani Summers

Wales representatives: Sam Cheetham

England representatives: Natalie Aldridge, Jenni Jones, Amy Lack, Alex von Haselberg-Palyvou

GB Roller/Skater/Inline representatives: Natalie Aldridge, Laura Saunders and Laura Stark.

2007–08 The Queen Bees finished 3rd in the WPL In the playoffs the Queen Bees finished 3rd beating Guildford 10-4.

In the British Women's Ice Hockey Friendship Tournament the Queen Bees became champions beating Slough Phantoms 4-2 in the final

Great Britain representatives: Alex von Haselberg-Palyvou, Amanda Carr

2008–09 The Queen Bees finished 4th in the WPL

In the playoffs the Queen Bees were champions beating Guildford Lightning 6–0

In the British Women's Ice Hockey Friendship Tournament the Queen Bees were runners up losing to Guildford Lightning on a 'sudden death' penalty shootout.

Great Britain representatives: Alex von Haselberg-Palyvou, Amanda Carr, Chrissy Newman and Leanne Ganney

2009–10 The Queen Bees finished 3rd in the WPL

In the playoffs the Queen Bees finished 3rd, losing 4–3 to Kingston

2010–11 The Queen Bees finished 4th in the WPL

In the playoffs the Queen Bees finished Champions beating Sheffield 2-1 on penalties

2011–12 The Queen Bees finished Champions in the WPL

In the playoffs the Queen Bees finished 3rd, losing 3–2 to Solihull

2012–13 The Queen Bees finished Champions in the WPL

The Queen Bees finished 3rd in the Elite Cup

In the playoffs the Queen Bees finished 2nd, losing 3–2 to Kingston

2013–14 The Queen Bees finished Champions in the WPL

The Queen Bees finished Champions in the Elite Cup

In the playoffs the Queen Bees finished, 2nd losing on penalties 2 1 to Kingston

2014–15 The Queen Bees finished Champions in the WPL

The Queen Bees finished Champions in the Elite Cup

In the playoffs the Queen Bees finished Champions beating Kingston 4-0

2015–16 The Queen Bees finished Champions in the newly formed Women's Elite League

In the playoffs the Queen Bees finished Champions beating Solihull 7–2

2016–17 The Queen Bees finished Champions in the Women's Elite League

In the playoffs the Queen Bees lost out to Solihull 3–4

2017–18 Champions

2018–19 The Queen Bees finished Champions in the Women's Elite League

2019-20 The Queen Bees finished 2nd in the Women's Elite League

Playoffs: the postseason was cancelled due to the COVID-19 pandemic, so there was no playoff finish recorded

2020-21 The 2020–21 WNIHL Elite season was not played because of the COVID-19 pandemic. As a result: The Bracknell Queen Bees did not record a league finishing position. No playoffs were held, so there was no playoff placing either.

Some friendly matches were played later in 2021, including a 10–0 Queen Bees win over Streatham Storm, but there was no official Elite League championship or playoff competition that season.

2021-22 The Queen Bees finished 2nd in the Women's Elite League

In the playoffs the Queen Bee didn't make it to the final.

2022-23 The Queen Bees finished 2nd in the Women's Elite League

In the playoffs the Queen Bees finished Champions beating Solihull Vixens.

2023-24 The Queen Bees finished Champions in the Women's Elite League

In the playoffs the Queen Bees finished Champions beating Solihull Vixens.

2024-25 The Queen Bees finished 2nd in the Women's Elite League.

In the playoffs the Queen Bees finished Champions beating Solihull Vixens 2-0

2025-26 The Queen Bees finished Champions in the Women's Elite League

In the playoffs the Queen Bees finished Champions beating Guildford lighting 2-1

=== The FireBees ===
Firebees training

2006–07 The FireBees finished 10th in the South Division 1 League

2007–08 The FireBees finished 9th in the South Division 1 League

2008–09 The FireBees finished 4th in the South Division 1 League

2009–10 The FireBees finished 4th in the South Division 1 League

2010–11 The FireBees finished 5th in the South Division 1 League

2011–12 The FireBees finished 4th in the South Division 1 League

In the British Women's Ice Hockey Friendship Tournament the FireBees finished 10th

2012–13 The FireBees finished 3rd in the South Division 1 League

2013–14 The FireBees finished 5th in the South Division 1 League

2014–15 The FireBees finished 4th in the South Division 1 League

2015–16 The FireBees finished 3rd in the South Division 1 League

2016–17 The FireBees finished 1st in the South Division 1 League and went on to defeat Basingstoke at the play-off weekend to win the National Division 1 final. This gained the FireBees promotion to the Women's Premier League for the 2017-18 season

2017–18 The FireBees finished 4th in the Premier League, and remained for the 2018-19 season

""2018–19"" Women’s Premier League; 6th place; avoided relegation

""2019–20"" Women’s Premier League; 5th; season cut short by COVID-19

""2020–21"" No competitive season (pandemic)

""2021–22"" WNIHL Premier; 4th; reached semi-finals

""2022–23"" WNIHL League (rebranded); 6th; did not qualify for playoffs

""2023–24"" WNIHL League; 4th; semi-final exit. Qualified for playoffs, Knockout of the semi-finals by Swindon Topcats.

""2024–25"" WNIHL League; 7th; mid-table finish

""2025–26"" WNIHL League; 2nd; Knockout of the playoffs semi-finals by Kingston Diamonds.

=== The Ice Bees ===
Bracknell Fire Bees 2005/06 Season

Bracknell Ice Bees 2007/08 Playoff Runners Up

2007–08 The Ice Bees finished the women's U16 Southern Division Champions

The Ice Bees were runners up in the U16 North v South play off losing to Kingston 5–2

EIHA U16's School of Excellence: Ellie Ranson, Louise Adams, Gemma Dale, Katherine Gale, Coral Backhurst, Meghan Sullivan, Jerrika Jentsch, Hannah Byrom

2008–09 The Ice Bees finished the women's U16 Southern Division Champions

The Ice Bees became national champion in the playoff final beating Kingston 3–2

EIHA U16's School of Excellence: Ellie Ranson, Gemma Dale, Katherine Gale, Coral Backhurst, Hannah Byrom, Samantha Bolwell, Monica Petrosino, Jessica Curtis

2009–10 The Ice Bees finished the women's U16 Southern Division Champions

The Ice Bees finished 2nd in the playoff final losing to Kingston 3–2

2010–11 The Ice Bees finished the women's U16 Southern Division Champions

The Ice Bees finished 2nd in the playoff final losing to Kingston 6–2

2011–12 The Ice Bees finished the women's U16 Southern Division Champions

The Ice Bees finished 2nd in the playoff final losing to Kingston 6–2 (again)

2012–13 The Ice Bees finished the women's U16 Southern Division Champions

The Ice Bees finished 2nd in the playoff final losing to Kingston 9-3

2013–14 The Ice Bees finished the women's U16 Southern Division Champions

The Ice Bees finished 2nd in the playoff final losing to Kingston 3-0

2014–15 The Ice Bees finished the women's U16 Southern Division Champions

The Ice Bees became national champion in the playoff final beating Kingston 7-4

2015–16 The Ice Bees finished the women's U16 Southern Division Champions

Conceded no (zero) goals in the entire season

The Ice Bees became national champion in the playoff final beating Sheffield 6-0

2016–17 The Ice Bees finished the women's U16 Southern Division Champions, and went on to defeat Sheffield again to become National Champions for Under-16 Girls

2017–18 Once again, the Ice Bees finished Champions.

2018–19 TBC - however most likely champions once again.
