= Women's ice hockey in Great Britain =

Ice hockey
- Country: Great Britain
- Governing body: Ice Hockey UK
- National team: Women's national team

National competitions
- Women's Premier League

Women's ice hockey in Great Britain is administered by the English and Scottish Ice Hockey Associations. It is one of the fastest growing areas of the game.

The British Women's Leagues were formed with six teams in 1984. The founder members of the league were:

- Brighton Amazons
- Cambridge University
- Oxford University
- Peterborough Ravens
- Solihull Vixens
- Streatham Strikers

Of those teams, only one has been in the league uninterrupted since: Solihull. Oxford University has at various points be told they can't play league hockey and have left and rejoined the league several times, and now play in the university leagues. (In the 1990s the governing body didn't want two teams playing out of the same rink but eventually relented so that in the late 1990s and early 2000s Oxford University and Oxford city both played in the league). Cambridge University had a non-league team for a long time. After the Ravens folded, a new team, the Penguins, was set up in Peterborough. Streatham Strickers folded in the early 1990s but a new Streatham team, Streatham Storm formed in 1996, re-entering the league in 1997 and remaining active ever since.

== League structure ==
In England and Wales, 36 teams play in the British Women's Leagues. The top 6 teams in the country play in the Elite League, with WNIHL 1 league consisting of 11 teams with 5 in the North and 6 in the South as at 2024-25 season, and below that WNIHL 2 is split into North (7 teams) and South (12 teams). The South is further split into South A and South B in WNIHL 2. The winners of South B are promoted with the last placed team of South A being relegated. There are also 14 U16 teams playing in a North and South format. U16 Girls hockey was introduced in 2007-08 season. Three teams (Oxford, Streatham and Bracknell) were created in a Southern Division and four teams were created in the women's U16 Northern Division. For 2008–09, Oxford folded and was replaced by Peterborough in the South.

In the Elite and WNIHL 1 Divisions (North and South), the sides play each other, twice home, twice away, with the team ranked highest being declared champion of each league.

At the end of each season the teams compete the playoffs. The winners of WNIHL 2 playoffs are automatically promoted to WNIHL 1, whereas the winners of WNIHL 1 play offs play a promotion and relegation game with the bottom placed Elite team to try and gain promotion. This game takes place on the Monday (as play offs played on a holiday weekend) after the U16s final.

In addition to the playoffs, there is promotion and relegation between the Elite, Premier, and Division 1 leagues. In 2004/05, this was decided with a Playoff Weekend at Coventry. The Division One sides played first in a one-off game; the following day the winner of that game played the 10th ranked team in the Premier league, to decide who played in the Premier and Division 1 leagues for the following season.

Three teams (Oxford, Streatham and Bracknell) were created in a Southern Division and four teams were created in the women's U16 Northern Division. For 2008–09, Oxford folded and was replaced by Peterborough in the South.

In 2022 the naming of the league was changed to:

- Elite
- WNIHL1
- WNIHL2

== Early history ==
=== Formation of the Women's English League ===
In the 1980s ice hockey was exclusively a male sport in the UK. Many ice skaters who wanted to start playing ice hockey were turned away at clubs being told that girls can't play ice hockey.

In Streatham, Sue Parsons was told just that. But instead of giving up, she fought hard to be allowed to play. She wrote to the British Ice Hockey association, but received no reply. She gathered a petition with lists of female players who wanted to play, and hand delivered it to the British Ice Hockey association, but again received no reply.

Meanwhile, in Oxford University, Deborah Coyne set up the first women's ice hockey team, and persuaded Cambridge to do the same and in 1982 they held the first women's Varsity game between Oxford and Cambridge. Sue Parsons and her friend Kate Quirrey actually played as the goalies in that first game, as neither Oxford nor Cambridge had a goalie. They became close friends of Debbie and all three worked hard to get the league set up.

A reporter from ITV advised Parsons to go to the Sports Council of Great Britain. they agreed to meet her and she showed them all the evidence that women wanted to play ice hockey and that they were actively playing hockey. The Sports Council of Great Britain then invited her to a second meeting, and also in attendance was the British Ice Hockey Association. The representative of the Sports Council delivered the message that the British Ice Hockey Association were not going to get any more funding until they included women in their programme.

In the early days, many of the women didn't have any kit, so would wear rolled up magazines down their socks and would be sharing and swapping helmets on the bench during games. Parsons went to other rinks to drum up interest in the game and encourage other women's teams to form.

An additional challenge during this period was the absence of qualified women's coaches, which was a prerequisite for participation. A number of male coaches provided support to women's teams, often despite opposition from peers within their own clubs. The early women's teams relied significantly on this assistance during their formative years.

1986

Set up of first Women's England Team. (More information needed)

== Teams ==
=== Elite League (after 2024/2025 season conclusion) ===
- Queen Bees
- Bristol Huskies
- Guildford Lightning
- Solihull Vixens
- Streatham Storm
- Whitley Bay Beacons

=== WNIHL 1 North (after 2024/2025 season conclusion) ===
- Caledonia Steel Queens
- Kingston Diamonds
- Nottingham Vipers
- Sheffield Shadows
- Solway Sharks

=== WNIHL 1 South (after 2024/2025 season conclusion) ===
- Cambridge Kodiaks (promoted 2025 Playoffs)
- Cardiff Comets (Query over relegation status)
- Chelmsford Cobras
- Milton Keynes Falcons
- Firebees
- Swindon Top Cats

=== Division 2 North League (after 2024/2025 season conclusion)^ ===
- Blackburn Hawks Women (Declared application to join)
- Caledonia Steel Queen Bees
- Kingston Diamonds
- Leeds Roses
- Sheffield Shadows B
- Telford Wrekin Raiders
- Whitley Bay Beacons B
- Widnes Wild Women

=== Division 2 South League (after 2024/2025 season conclusion) ===
- Haringey Greyhounds (promoted by winning South B) ^
- Oxford Midnight Stars ^
- Slough Sirens ^
- Solent Amazons ^
- Streatham Storm B ^
- Peterborough Phantoms Women
- Bristol Huskies B
- Chelmsford Pythons
- Coventry Phoenix
- Invicta Dynamics
- Lee Valley Vampires

^Denotes South A team Italics Uncertain on placement

== History ==
Below is a list of the winners of the major competitions. The team's standing is shown in win–loss–tie format.

=== Women's English League ===
- 1984/85 - Peterborough Ravens (8-0-0)
- 1985/86 - Streatham Strikers (11-1-0)
- 1986/87 - Oxford University Blues (12-0-0)
- 1987/88 - Streatham Strikers (10-1-1)

The Women's England League was the first incarnation of the league, starting with five teams before moving up to seven by 1988. An influx of interest from new teams resulted in a complete regionalisation of the sport, a system that lasted two years.

=== Regionalised British League ===
==== Overall champion ====
- 1988/89 - Oxford City Rockets (beat Streatham Strikers 3–1 in final game)
- 1989/90 - no official champion*

Oxford City Rockets declared unofficial champions after beating Streatham in a regional playoff by four goals to one. Rockets were never able to play the final against Sunderland (champions of the Northern Division).

==== Northern Division ====
- 1988/89 - Sunderland Scorpions (4–0–2)
- 1989/90 - Sunderland Scorpions (6–1–1)

==== Central Division ====
- 1988/89 - Oxford City Rockets (10–0–0)
- 1989/90 - Oxford City Rockets (12–0–0)

==== Capital/South Division ====
- 1988/89 - Streatham Strikers (10–0–0)
- 1989/90 - Streatham Strikers (8–0–0)

After two years of this format, the system switched to the structure that exists to the present day, making it after 15 years one of the longest lasting formats of any ice hockey league that ever has been in the UK.

=== British Women's Leagues ===
==== Elite League ====
- 2015/16 - Bracknell Queen Bees (12–2–2)
- 2016/17 - Solihull Vixens (14–3–3)
- 2017/18 - Bracknell Queen Bees
- 2018/19 - Bracknell Queen Bees

==== Premier League ====
- 1990/91 - Oxford City Rockets (9–0–1)
- 1991/92 - Oxford City Rockets (13–0–1)
- 1992/93 - Oxford City Rockets (14–0–0)
- 1993/94 - Bracknell Queen Bees (9–1–2)
- 1994/95 - Sunderland Scorpions (11–2–1)
- 1995/96 - Sunderland Scorpions (13–0–1)
- 1996/97 - Sunderland Scorpions (14–0–0)
- 1997/98 - Sunderland Scorpions (13–1–0)
- 1998/99 - Slough Phantoms (12–1–1)
- 1999/00 - Nottingham Vipers (11–2–1)
- 2000/01 - Sunderland Scorpions (11–2–1)
- 2001/02 - Guildford Lightning (15–1–0)
- 2002/03 - Cardiff Comets (13–2–1)
- 2003/04 - Sunderland Scorpions (16–2–0)
- 2004/05 - Sunderland Scorpions (16–2–2)
- 2005/06 - Newcastle Vipers (15–2–1)
- 2006/07 - Slough Phantoms (16–1–1)
- 2007/08 - Slough Phantoms (17–1–0)
- 2008/09 - Sheffield Shadows (17–1–0)
- 2009/10 - Slough Phantoms (17–0–1)
- 2010/11 - Sheffield Shadows (17–0–1)
- 2011/12 - Kingston Hull Diamonds (12–0–4)
- 2012/13 - Kingston Hull Diamonds (14–0–2)
- 2013/14 - Kingston Hull Diamonds (11–0–3)
- 2014/15 - Bracknell Queen Bees (13–0–1)
- 2015/16 - Swindon Top Cats (12–2–0)
- 2016/17 - Milton Keyes Falcons (9–2–1)

==== Division One (North) ====
- 1990/91 - Unknown
- 1991/92 - Unknown
- 1992/93 - Unknown
- 1993/94 - Unknown
- 1994/95 - Sheffield Shadows (8–0–0)
- 1995/96 - Solihull Vixens (record unknown)
- 1996/97 - Solihull Vixens (5–2–1)
- 1997/98 - Kingston Hull Diamonds (10–2–0)
- 1998/99 - Kingston Hull Diamonds (13–2–1)
- 1999/00 - Kingston Hull Diamonds (15–3–2)
- 2000/01 - Billingham Wildcats (15–1–0)
- 2001/02 - Sheffield Shadows (15–0–1)
- 2002/03 - Flintshire Furies (12–4–0)
- 2003/04 - (Telford) Wrekin Raiders (18–1–1)
- 2004/05 - Billingham Wildcats (12–2–2)
- 2005/06 - Nottingham Vipers (11–0–3)
- 2006/07 - Billingham Wildcats (12–1–1)
- 2007/08 - Nottingham Vipers (11–1–2)
- 2008/09 - Billingham Wildcats (12–1–1)
- 2009/10 - Flintshire Furies (17–0–1)
- 2010/11 - Sheffield Shadows B (13–0–1)
- 2011/12 - Whitley Bay Squaws (15–1–0)
- 2012/13 - Whitley Bay Squaws (14–0–0)
- 2013/14 - Whitley Bay Squaws (15–1–0)
- 2014/15 - Manchester Phoenix (16–1–1)
- 2015/16 - Billingham Wildcats (10–1–1)
- 2016/17 - Billingham Wildcats (9–0–1)

==== Division One (Midlands) ====
- 2008/09 - Milton Keyes Falcons (12–1–1)
- 2009/10 - Milton Keyes Falcons (12–2–0)

==== Division One (South) ====
- 1990/91 - Unknown
- 1991/92 - Unknown
- 1992/93 - Unknown
- 1993/94 - Guildford Lightning (record unknown)
- 1994/95 - Chelmsford Cobras (8–0–0)
- 1995/96 - Chelmsford Cobras (record unknown)
- 1996/97 - Romford Nighthawks (7–2–1)
- 1997/98 - Basingstoke Bison Ladies (13–0–1)
- 1998/99 - Cardiff Comets (12–0–0)
- 1999/00 - Cardiff Comets (14–0–0)
- 2000/01 - Romford Nighthawks (15–0–1)
- 2001/02 - Basingstoke Bison Ladies (15–2–1)
- 2002/03 - Solihull Vixens (17–0–1)
- 2003/04 - Romford Nighthawks (18–0–0)
- 2004/05 - Streatham Storm (17–0–3)
- 2005/06 - Swindon Top Cats (17–1–0)
- 2006/07 - Swindon Top Cats (17–1–0)
- 2007/08 - Swindon Top Cats (18–0–0)
- 2008/09 - Chelmsford Cobras (13–0–1)
- 2009/10 - Basingstoke Bison Ladies (13–0–3)
- 2010/11 - Milton Keyes Falcons (17–0–1)
- 2011/12 - Cardiff Comets (14–1–1)
- 2012/13 - Chelmsford Cobras (12–0–0)
- 2013/14 - Swindon Top Cats (16–0–0)
- 2014/15 - Swindon Top Cats (16–0–0)
- 2015/16 - Invicta Dynamics (12–0–0)
- 2016/17 - Bracknell Firebees (10–1–1)
- 2017/18 - Basingstoke Bison
- 2018/19 - Swindon Topcats (13–2–1)

==== U16 Northern Division ====
- 2007/08 - Kingston Hull Junior Diamonds (5–0–1)
- 2008/09 - Kingston Hull Junior Diamonds (4–0–0)
- 2009/10 - Kingston Hull Junior Diamonds (record unknown)
- 2010/11 - Kingston Hull Junior Diamonds (7–1–0)
- 2011/12 - Kingston Hull Junior Diamonds (4–0–0)
- 2012/13 - Kingston Hull Junior Diamonds (4–0–0)
- 2013/14 - Kingston Hull Junior Diamonds (3–0–0)
- 2014/15 - Kingston Hull Junior Diamonds (2–0–1)
- 2015/16 - Sheffield Shadows U16 (7–0–1)
- 2016/17 - Sheffield Shadows U16 (7–0–0)

==== U16 Southern Division ====
- 2007/08 - Bracknell Ice Bees (7–1–0)
- 2008/09 - Bracknell Ice Bees (7–1–0)
- 2009/10 - Bracknell Ice Bees (5–1–0)
- 2010/11 - Bracknell Ice Bees (4–0–2)
- 2011/12 - Bracknell Ice Bees (8–0–0)
- 2012/13 - Bracknell Ice Bees (2–1–1)
- 2013/14 - Bracknell Ice Bees (3–1–0)
- 2014/15 - Bracknell Ice Bees (6–0–0)
- 2015/16 - Bracknell Ice Bees (6–0–0)
- 2016/17 - Bracknell Ice Bees (10–2–0)

=== Trophy Weekend ===
The Trophy Weekend has been split into the Bill Britton Memorial Trophy and D1 Trophy. The Memorial Trophy sees 1st vs 4th and 2nd vs 3rd in the Premier League, with the winners playing the final the following day.

Prior to the Memorial Trophy being renamed, it was called the Chairman's Cup.

The D1 Trophy sees the Champion of the North playing the runner-up of the South, and Champion of the South vs runner-up of the North, with the winners playing the final the following day.

The introduction of the Women's U16 Northern and Southern (season 2007/08) created a third play-off final between the winners of each league.

==== Bill Britton Memorial Trophy ====
- 2005/06 - Sheffield Shadows bt Newcastle Vipers (3–0)
- 2006/07 - Bracknell Queen Bees bt Newcastle Vipers (2–1)
- 2007/08 - Sheffield Shadows bt Slough Phantoms (4–2)
- 2008/09 - Bracknell Queen Bees bt Guildford Lightning (6–0)

==== Chairman's Cup ====
- 1990/91 - Oxford City Rockets bt Bracknell Queen Bees (5–1)
- 1991/92 - Oxford City Rockets bt Bracknell Queen Bees (2–1) (AOT) (APS)
- 1992/93 - Oxford City Rockets bt Bracknell Queen Bees (4–0)
- 1993/94 - Bracknell Queen Bees bt Slough Phamtons (7–2)
- 1994/95 - Sunderland Scorpions bt Guildford Lightning (4–2)
- 1995/96 - Unknown
- 1996/97 - Sunderland Scorpions bt Bracknell Queen Bees (3–2) (AOT)
- 1997/98 - Sunderland Scorpions bt Bracknell Queen Bees (4–2)
- 1998/99 - Sunderland Scorpions bt Slough Phantoms (6–3)
- 1999/00 - Sunderland Scorpions bt Nottingham Vipers (4–0)
- 2000/01 - Guildford Lightning bt Slough Phantoms (1–0)
- 2001/02 - Sunderland Scorpions bt Guildford Lightning (2–1)
- 2002/03 - Cardiff Comets bt Sunderland Scorpions (5–4) (AOT) (APS)
- 2003/04 - Sunderland Scorpions bt Guildford Lightning (2–0)
- 2004/05 - Bracknell Queen Bees bt Sunderland Scorpions (1–0)

==== Division One Trophy ====
- 1996/97 - Solihull Vixens bt Kingston Hull Diamonds (5–0)
- 1997/98 - Kingston Hull Diamonds bt Basingstoke Bison Ladies (4–3)
- 1998/99 - Kingston Hull Diamonds bt Cardiff Comets (1–0) (AOT) (APS)
- 1999/00 - Kingston Hull Diamonds bt Billingham Wildcats (2–1)
- 2000/01 - Billingham Wildcats bt Sheffield Shadows (4–2)
- 2001/02 - Sheffield Shadows bt Whitley Bay Squaws (7–2)
- 2002/03 - Solihull Vixens bt Flintshire Furies (1–0)
- 2003/04 - Solihull Vixens bt Whitley Bay Squaws (9–2)
- 2004/05 - Streatham Storm bt Basingstoke Bison Ladies (3–1)
- 2005/06 - Swindon Top Cats bt Nottingham Vipers (3–1)
- 2006/07 - Swindon Top Cats bt Billingham Wildcats (4–0)
- 2007/08 - Swindon Top Cats bt Chelmsford Cobras (6–4)

==== Women's U16 Trophy ====
- 2007/08 - Kingston Hull Junior Diamonds bt Bracknell Ice Bees (5–2)
- 2008/09 - Bracknell Ice Bees bt Kingston Hull Junior Diamonds (3–2)

=== Promotion/relegation playoffs ===
Information on these playoffs is sketchy; however, the following contains most of them. Playoffs were not held in every season due to either team's not wanting to go for promotion to the higher league, or a natural expansion of the Premier League.

- 1994/95 - Sheffield Shadows bt Durham Dynamites (unknown score)
- 1995/96 - Chelmsford Cobras bt Solihull Vixens (unknown score)
- 1996/97 - Solihull Vixens bt Chelmsford Cobras (unknown score)
- 1997/98 - Basingstoke Bison Ladies bt (Telford) Wrekin Raiders (5–0,5–1)
- 1998/99 - Nottingham Vipers bt Kingston Hull Diamonds (2–1,5–3)
- 1999-2004 - Playoff system scrapped, Premier League naturally expanded.
- 2004/05 - Streatham Storm bt Swindon Top Cats (1–0)
- 2005/06 - Nottingham Vipers bt Flintshire Furies (11–1)

=== Knockout Cup ===
The Knockout Cup was proposed to allow teams of different standard to play each other, and also to increase the number of competitions played in the women's game.

- 2002/2003 - Bracknell Queen Bees bt Swindon Top Cats (4–1)
- 2003/2004 - Kingston Hull Diamonds bt Solihull Vixens (4–3) (APS)
- 2004/2005 - Bracknell Queen Bees bt Swindon Top Cats (8–2)
- 2005/2006 - Newcastle Vipers bt Solihull Vixens (5–1)
- 2006/2007 - Bracknell Queen Bees bt Solihull Vixens (5–0)

== Regional/national/international sides ==
In the UK, there are five sides that play at regional, national and international levels.

=== Regional level ===
England is divided into two regional sides, featuring the best players who have not been selected for Team Great Britain. The regional sides are a recent addition to assist with the development of the top women's and girls' hockey in the UK. For the purposes of the records shown, only games against other regional, national or international teams shall be considered.

In addition, the conference sections are divided into Senior and Junior (U16) teams.

- North of England Senior: 1–2
- North of England Junior: 1–1
- South of England Senior: 1–1
- South of England Junior: 1–1

=== National teams ===
In total there are three national teams, although Team England has been defunct since 2002. 2006 saw the England team reinstated and an Under 16 England added to the list of national teams. In August 2006 both teams travelled to Prague for a training camp, followed by a tournament in Pilzen which saw the Senior Team play their way to a silver medal.

Details of all Home Internationals known are shown below:

- Saturday, 25 June 2005 - Team Wales 4 - 0 Team Scotland @ Cardiff
- Saturday, 10 April 2004 - Team Scotland 0 - 7 Team Wales @ Paisley
- Saturday, 18 May 2002 - Team England 1 - 4 Team Wales @ Nottingham
- Saturday, 30 January 1993 - Team England 7 - 0 Team Scotland @ Sheffield
- Saturday, 16 May 1992 - Team England 3 - 1 Team Scotland @ Nottingham
- Saturday, 28 December 1991 - Team Scotland 1 - 1 Team England @ Murrayfield

The overall records of the teams are therefore:

- Team England : 2–1–1
- Team Scotland : 0–4–1
- Team Wales : 3–0–0

=== Team GB ===
Team Great Britain is the national side that represents the UK in firstly the European Championships followed by the IIHF World Championships.

Below is a guide to GB's performances year by year. Only 'competitive' games (challenge matches ignored) are counted for the records.

==== 1989 ====
Team GB re-entered the world of international Hockey with a European Championship two-leg qualifying match against the Netherlands in Chelmsford. GB battled hard in both games but were defeated by an experienced Dutch side, winning both games by the margin of four goals to two, giving the Dutch an 8–4 aggregate win and a place in the European Championship.

Overall record: 0–2–0

==== 1990 ====
No official competitions existed; however, GB defeated the Dutch in Amsterdam 1–0 in a challenge match.

==== 1991 ====
Team GB took part in the 1991 European Championship finishing 9th out of 10 teams. Placed in a very tough Group B, they lost their first three games to Sweden (0–16), Denmark (0–4) and Germany (0–6) before surprising the Czech Republic with a 2–2 draw in their final game. GB finished bottom of their group, and played Holland in the 9th/10th playoff which they won 3–0.

Record: 1–3–1

==== 1993 ====
After the break for an Olympic year, GB started again in the newly formed European Championship Pool B. Following an opening loss against Latvia (0–3), GB repeated their performance against the Czech Republic from two years previous, this time with a 1–1 draw. France dispatched GB easily in the third game by 7 goals to 2, and GB won their first international game in the final match of the tournament with a 1–0 win over Ukraine. giving GB a 4th place finish out of five teams, with GB only missing a medal by one point.

Record: 1–2–1

==== 1995 ====
GB went to Denmark for the IIHF European Women's Championships Pool B in March 1995, faced a tough group on paper and proved to be a tough group on ice. GB fell to their worst defeat in four years in the opening game with a 14–1 defeat to Denmark. Slovakia defeated GB 4–1 and in the final group game Holland put seven past the Brits, with only two coming back.

The 7th/8th playoff game saw GB take on Ukraine, the only side they had beaten in competitive hockey so far. Ukraine skated to a 2–0 victory which saw GB finish 8th out of eight teams.

Record: 0–4–0

Team roster:

- Gill Barton – Guildford
- Julie Biles – Guildford
- Verity Boome – Guildford
- Laura Bugbee – Slough
- Sarah Burton – Swindon
- Rachael Cotton – Bracknell
- Lisa Davies – Bracknell
- Lynsey Emmerson – Sunderland
- Fiona Johnstone – Swindon
- Fiona King – Guildford
- Teresa Lewis – Sunderland
- Julie Lossnitzer – Slough
- Jane McLelland – Sunderland
- Jeanette Mountjoy – Bracknell
- Sarah Musgrove – Telford
- Kathy Nike – Bracknell
- Kim Strongman – Guildford
- Laura Urquhart – Slough
- Louise Wheeler – Slough
- Manager – Anne Sheppard. Head Coach – Mike Urquhart. Asst Coaches – Charlie Colon and Paul O'Higgins.

==== 1996 ====
A trip to Slovakia was in store for GB in Pool B in 1996. GB started positively with a much better account against Denmark who they had been routed against the previous year falling only to a 5–0 defeat. Any hopes of a great comeback were dashed in their second game against the Danes who GB had previously done well against, collapsing to a 7–1 defeat. That scoreline was repeated in the final group round game against the Dutch to leave GB adrift at the bottom of their group.

The 7th/8th playoff saw GB take on Kazakhstan and for the first time in the tournament. Kazakhstan was just able to edge ahead and won by the odd goal in 9 leaving GB in 8th out of eight place and without a win in two years.

Record: 0–4–0

Team roster:

- Gill Barton – Guildford
- Julie Biles – Guildford
- Verity Boome – Peterborough
- Becky Bowles – Bracknell
- Sarah Burton – Swindon
- Laura Byrne – Oxford
- Rachael Cotton – Bracknell
- Lisa Davies – Bracknell
- Lynsey Emmerson – Sunderland
- Fiona King – Guildford
- Teresa Lewis – Sunderland
- Jane McLelland – Sunderland
- Jeanette Mountjoy – Bracknell
- Claire Pannell – Bracknell
- Debbie Palmer – Swindon
- Nicola Pattinson – Sunderland
- Cheryl Smith – Sunderland
- Michelle Smith – Sunderland
- Kim Strongman – Guildford
- Laura Urquhart – Sunderland
- Elaine Whitney – Telford

==== 1999 ====
Székesfehérvár, Hungary

Following a re-structure in the World Championships, and no championship in 1998 due to it being an Olympic year, GB finally came back into the new Pool B Qualifying Group to decide the final spot in Pool B for the following year.

Great Britain opened brightly holding Italy to a 1–1 draw after 40 minutes in the opening game before Italy stepping the game up a gear to skate out to a 4–1 victory; however, the signs looked good. The next game was against South Africa, which ended to be a sporting contest on the opening puck drop with GB running up their highest ever victory at international level with a 22–0 victory.

After a slow start in the final game GB hit the host team Hungary hard with five quick goals in a match that ended up as 9–1 to the Brits, leaving them to finish 2nd out of four teams.

Record: 2–1–0

Team roster:

- Natalie Arthur – Backburn
- Zoe Bayne – Billinghham
- Nicola Bicknell – Slough
- Vicky Burton – Bracknell
- Laura Byrne – Bracknell
- Louise Fisher – Slough
- Amy Johnson – Haringey
- Fiona King – Guildford
- Teresa Lewis – Basingstoke
- Claire Oldfield – Whitley Bay
- Ceri Powell – Solihull
- Tasmin Quinn – Basingstoke
- Vicky Robbins – Guildford
- Cheryl Smith – Slough
- Michelle Smith – Slough
- Tonia Scialdone – Solihull
- Emily Turner – Sheffield
- Louise Wheeler – Slough
- Manager – Teresa Fisher. Coaches – Mike Urquhart, Laura Urquhart and David Graham.

==== 2000 ====
Székesfehérvár, Hungary

It was back to Hungary in 2000, for the Pool B Qualifying Tournament. GB again had a strong start with the Brits 1–1 against the Group Favorites DPR Korea in their first game. Korea struck back with two 2nd period goals but despite a fightback by GB, the game ended up 4–2 to the Asian side.

Australia were next up for GB and were comfortably dispatched by seven goals to one. GB finally defeated Holland in a competitive game, 11 years after their first attempt with a comfortable 5–2 victory. GB again finished second out of four teams in their group.

Belgium, who finished second in the other group, took on GB in the 3rd/4th place playoff. GB comfortably dispatched the Belgians by 8 goals to 1 which saw GB ranked overall third out of eight teams.

Record: 3–1–0

Team roster:

- Natalie Arthur – Blackburn
- Zoe Bayne – Billingham
- Nicola Bicknell – Slough
- Vicky Burton – Bracknell
- Laura Byrne – Bracknell
- Samantha Cheetham – Bracknell
- Louise Fisher – Slough
- Susan Hemmerman – Kingston
- Amy Johnson – Swindon
- Fiona King – Guildford
- Claire Oldfield – Whitley Bay
- Debbie Palmer – Swindon
- Vicky Robbins – Guildford
- Tonia Scialdone – Nottingham
- Cheryl Smith – Nottingham
- Michelle Smith – Nottingham
- Emily Turner – Sheffield
- Louise Wheeler – Slough
- Manager – Teresa Fisher. Head Coach – Laura Urquhart.

==== 2001 ====
Maribor, Slovenia

Pool B overnight was renamed Division 1, but apart from that the challenge stayed the same for GB with their third straight attempt at qualification into the 2nd tier.

GB looked to their first game against hosts Slovenia to set the standard for the tournament and they did not disappoint. 5–0 up after 20 minutes, they went on to win 12–0. Hungary also fell to a GB by 12 goals to 0 in Game 2, and with GB dispatching the Aussies by 4–2 in Game 3 they were left in the pleasant situation of played 3, won 3, scored 28, conceded 2.

Slovakia took on GB in the final game. Despite getting a goal back in the 3rd, Team GB went down to a 4–1 defeat against Slovakia and finished second in their group for the third consecutive year.

Record: 3–1–0

Team roster:

- Natalie Arthur – Blackburn
- Zoe Bayne – Billingham
- Nicola Bicknell – Slough
- Laura Burke – Sheffield
- Vicky Burton – Bracknell
- Laura Byrne – Bracknell
- Louise Fisher – Guildford
- Susan Hemmerman – Kingston
- Amy Johnson – Bracknell
- Fiona King – Guildford
- Teresa Lewis – Sunderland
- Rachel McCabe – Billingham
- Claire Oldfield – Whitley Bay
- Vicky Robbins – Guildford
- Tonia Scialdone – Birmingham
- Cheryl Smith – Nottingham
- Michelle Smith – Nottingham
- Emily Turner – Sheffield
- Louise Wheeler – Slough
- Gillian Wyatt – Kingston
- Manager – Alison McCabe, Head Coach – Tony Hall. Assistant Coach – Reg Wilcox.

==== 2002 ====
Hull, UK

An Olympic year saw no official hockey taking place, but the IIHF hosted a women's challenge tri-series between Italy, Belgium and GB, held in Hull.

GB beat Belgium, but fell to Italy to finish second in the three team group.

Team roster:

- Zoe Bayne – Billingham
- Kirstin Beattie – Murrayfield
- Nicola Bicknell – Slough
- Verity Boome – Slough
- Heather Brunning – Bracknell
- Laura Burke – Sheffield
- Vicky Burton – Bracknell
- Louise Fisher – Guildford
- Alex von Haselberg – Guildford
- Susan Hemmerman – Kingston
- Fiona King – Guildford
- Alice Lamb – Slough
- Claire Oldfield – Whitley Bay
- Vicky Robbins – Guildford
- Tonia Scialdone – Birmingham
- Angela Taylor – Paisley
- Emily Turner – Sheffield
- Gemma Watt – Paisley
- Gillian Wyatt – Kingston
- Hannah Young – Guildford
- Manager – Alison McCabe. Head Coach – Tony Hall. Assistant Coach – Reg Wilcox.

==== 2003 ====
Lecco, Italy

The tea were off to Italy for Division 2, which now sported six teams in direct parity with the men's game for the first time.

GB collapsed to the worst possible start against longtime foes Slovakia. 5–0 down after the first period, they ended up losing 8–1 to the Eastern Bloc side. Game 2 against group favourites Norway was just as tough for the Brits along a spirited performance saw them just 1–0 down after the first GB collapsed to an 8–3 defeat.

Game 3 against Denmark saw a pulsating clash from end to end which saw GB register their first points with a 4–4 draw; however, after leading the Danes were 1–0 at the end of the 1st. The Netherlands, a long term bogey team of the Brits, skated to a 4–2 win over GB. GB's final game against Italy proved too much for them and they were defeated as they had been the previous year to an experienced Italian side, this time 4–2.

GB were relegated, or so was thought. However, due to the SARS pandemic in China the World Championships were cancelled for that year and the IIHF did not relegate any teams from any divisions, effectively rescuing GB from relegation.

Record: 0–4–1

Team roster:

- Zoe Bayne – Sheffield
- Kirstin Beattie – Murrayfield
- Nicola Bicknell – Slough
- Verity Boome – Slough
- Heather Brunning – Bracknell
- Laura Burke – Sheffield
- Vicky Burton – Bracknell
- Lynsey Emmerson – Sunderland
- Alex von Haselberg – Guildford
- Fiona King – Guildford
- Teresa Lewis – Sunderland
- Eleanor Maitland – Kilmarnock
- Ami Merrick – Cardiff
- Claire Oldfield – Sunderland
- Vicky Robbins – Basingstoke
- Angela Taylor – Paisley
- Emily Turner – Sheffield
- Gemma Watt – Paisley
- Gillian Wyatt – Kingston
- Hannah Young – Guildford
- Manager – Ian Turner. Head Coach – Tony Hall. Assistant Coach – Reg Wilcox.

==== 2004 ====
Vipiteno-Sterzing, Italy

From a standings point of view, the 2004 saw GB's worst ever performance in international ice hockey, with defeats to Denmark, Italy, Slovakia, the Netherlands and Australia.

However, when a team is washed out a goal on a wraparound due to the referee 'losing sight of the puck' as it went round the net, there is not much to be done. GB battled desperately hard under some of the worst refereeing ever seen in an international competition.

GB were relegated to Division 3 along with Australia.

Record: 0–5–0

Team roster:

- Zoe Bayne – Sheffield
- Kirstin Beattie – Murrayfield
- Nicola Bicknell – Slough
- Lynsey Emmerson – Sheffield
- Louise Fisher – Guildford
- Lauren Halliwell – Kingston
- Alex von Haselberg – Guildford
- Kelly Herring – Peterborough
- Becky Kasner – Whitley Bay
- Fiona King – Guildford
- Eleanor Maitland – Kilmarnock
- Ami Merrick – Cardiff
- Claire Oldfield – Sunderland
- Vicky Robbins – Basingstoke
- Helen Stowe – Sunderland
- Angela Taylor – Pailsey
- Emily Turner – Sheffield
- Gemma Watt – Sunderland
- Katherine Wiggins – Guildford
- Gillian Wyatt – Sheffield
- Hannah Young – Guildford
- Manager – Ian Turner. Head Coach – Reg Wilcox. Assistant Coach – Jo Abbs

==== 2005 ====
Cape Town, South Africa

Division III was the setting for GB. GB started off the tournament in impressive fashion easily dispatching Hungary 5–0 followed by an 11–0 demolition of Belgium.

GB's minds were however firmly planted on the 3rd game, without a doubt the title decider. GB went a goal down at 26:56 before Newcastle's Teresa Lewis opened the account for GB on the half hour mark.

With the scores neatly tied at 1 heading into the final period, GB battled hard. University of New Hampshire's Angela Taylor picked up a penalty for highsticking at 47:39, and with eight seconds left in the game heartbreak as Slovenia took the lead. GB were never able to get back in the game and ended losing 4–1 with the final goal placed into the empty net.

Game 4 saw GB take out their frustrations of the previous game with a 19–0 victory over South Africa, who were saved relegation by the IIHF Women's Committee as they expanded the Elite competition to nine teams, and thus no teams were relegated this time around.

Game 5 saw GB finally lay the ghost of a year ago with a 6–2 victory over Australia to ensure GB's 2nd place finish.

Record: 4–1–0

Team Roster:

- Zoe Bayne – Sheffield
- Kirstin Beattie – Murrayfield
- Nicola Bicknell – Slough
- Laura Burke – Sheffield
- Lynsey Emmerson – Sunderland
- Louise Fisher – Guildford
- Lauren Halliwell – Kingston
- Kelly Herring – Slough
- Becky Kasner – Whitley Bay
- Beth Kavanagh – Flintshire
- Fiona King – Guildford
- Alice Lamb – Slough
- Claire Oldfield – Sunderland
- Vicky Robbins – Basingstoke
- Angela Taylor – Paisley
- Emily Turner – Sheffield
- Katherine Wiggins – Guildford
- Gillian Wyatt – Sheffield
- Laura Urquhart – Nottingham
- Teresa Lewis – Sunderland
- Manager: Ian Turner, Head Coach: Reg Wilcox. Assistant Coach: Jo Abbs

==== Overall record ====
GB's all time competitive international record stands at: 14–28–3
