= 2023 IIHF Women's World Championship Division III =

International ice hockey tournament

Tournament details
- Host countries: Romania; Israel
- Venues: 2 (in 2 host cities)
- Dates: 3–9 April; 26–31 March
- Teams: 9

The 2023 IIHF Women's World Championship Division III consisted of two international ice hockey tournaments of the 2023 Women's Ice Hockey World Championships organized by the International Ice Hockey Federation (IIHF). Division III A and Division III B represent the sixth and seventh tier of the IIHF World Women's Championship.

Hong Kong took the Group A tournament and got promoted, while Estonia were relegated to Group B. Serbia won the Group B tournament and were promoted to Group A.

== Group A tournament ==
2023 IIHF Women's World Championship Division III A

Tournament details
- Host country: Romania
- City: Brașov
- Venue: 1 (in 1 host city)
- Dates: 3–9 April
- Teams: 6

Tournament statistics
- Games played: 15
- Goals scored: 99 (6.6 per game)
- Attendance: 2,260 (151 per game)
- Scoring leader: (Lithuania) Klara Miuller (18 points)

Official website
- www.iihf.com

The Division III Group A tournament was played in Brașov, Romania, from 3 to 9 April 2023.

=== Participating teams ===
Team	Qualification
Lithuania	Placed 2nd in Division III A last year.
Bulgaria	Placed 3rd in Division III A last year.
Romania	Hosts; did not participate last year.
Ukraine	Did not participate last year.
Hong Kong	Did not participate last year.
Estonia	Placed 1st in Division III B last year and were promoted.

=== Match officials ===
Four referees and six linesmen were selected for the tournament.

Referees	Linesmen
(Austria) Ulrike Winklmayr; (Czech Republic) Ilona Novotná; (United Kingdom) Emma Sanders; (South Korea) Lee Kyung-sun	(France) Laura Peronnin; (Germany) Julia Strube; (Iceland) Elva Hjálmarsdóttir; (Netherlands) Amy Keijzers; (Sweden) Julia Hjelmström; (Turkey) Elif Bağlar

=== Final standings ===
Pos	Team	Pld	W	OTW	OTL	L	GF	GA	GD	Pts	Promotion or relegation
1	Hong Kong	5	4	0	1	0	18	9	+9	13	Promoted to the 2024 Division II B
2	Ukraine	5	4	0	0	1	22	6	+16	12	
3	Lithuania	5	3	1	0	1	25	10	+15	11	
4	Romania (H)	5	2	0	0	3	17	14	+3	6	
5	Bulgaria	5	1	0	0	4	15	36	−21	3	
6	Estonia	5	0	0	0	5	2	24	−22	0	Relegated to the 2024 Division III B

Source: IIHF
Rules for classification: 1) points; 2) head-to-head points; 3) head-to-head goal difference; 4) head-to-head number of goals scored; 5) result against closest best-ranked team outside tied teams; 6) result against second-best ranked team outside tied teams; 7) seeding before tournament.
(H) Host

=== Match results ===
All times are local (Eastern European Summer Time – UTC+3)

3 April 2023; 13:00	Lithuania	6–0 (1–0, 3–0, 2–0)	Estonia	Olympic Ice Rink, Brașov; Attendance: 50

Game reference

Viltė Beličenkaitė
Emilie Simonsen
Goalies
Uljana Jeggi
Referee:
(United Kingdom) Emma Sanders
Linesmen:
(Turkey) Elif Bağlar
(Iceland) Elva Hjálmarsdóttir

Miuller – 06:31	1–0
Miuller (Petrauskaitė) – 24:54	2–0
Rastenytė (Jasinevičiūtė) – 32:36	3–0
Miuller (Rastenytė) – 39:47	4–0
Jasinevičiūtė (Rastenytė) – 50:46	5–0
Miuller (Tučiūtė, Petrauskaitė) – 52:34	6–0

2 min
Penalties
4 min
40
Shots
24

3 April 2023; 16:30	Bulgaria	2–6 (1–4, 1–1, 0–1)	Hong Kong	Olympic Ice Rink, Brașov; Attendance: 50

Game reference

Paulina Georgieva
Goalies
Chau Sumi
Referee:
(Czech Republic) Ilona Novotná
Linesmen:
(Netherlands) Amy Keijzers
(Germany) Julia Strube

	0–1	13:14 – Ng (C. Wong) (SH)
	0–2	14:13 – Ip (A. Li)
	0–3	16:11 – Cheng (Lee)
Stoyanova (Kotseva, Asparuhova) (PP) – 17:37	1–3
	1–4	19:56 – Ng (Ip, C. Wong) (PP)
	1–5	24:35 – Ip (Ng, T. Wong)
Dimitrova (Stoyanova) – 26:07	2–5
	2–6	58:26 – Ng (C. Wong)

16 min
Penalties
12 min
14
Shots
46

3 April 2023; 20:00	Romania	0–4 (0–1, 0–3, 0–0)	Ukraine	Olympic Ice Rink, Brașov; Attendance: 400

Game reference

Nadina Niciu
Goalies
Viktoria Tkachenko
Referee:
(South Korea) Lee Kyung-sun
Linesmen:
(Sweden) Julia Hjelmström
(France) Laura Peronnin

0–1	15:18 – Dobrovolska (Tsymyrenko)
0–2	27:14 – Eli. Alipova (Dobrovolska)
0–3	30:13 – Mashkina (Tsymyrenko)
0–4	39:38 – Telehina (Les)

12 min
Penalties
8 min
21
Shots
59

4 April 2023; 13:00	Estonia	2–6 (1–2, 1–3, 0–1)	Bulgaria	Olympic Ice Rink, Brașov; Attendance: 40

Game reference

Sofia Salamatina
Goalies
Paulina Georgieva
Petya Simeoneva
Referee:
(Austria) Ulrike Winklmayr
Linesmen:
(Turkey) Elif Bağlar
(Netherlands) Amy Keijzers

Parnik (Kulla, Lauk-Gurtovoi) – 00:47	1–0
	1–1	07:55 – Asparuhova (Stoyanova) (PP)
	1–2	09:25 – Stoyanova (Runevska, Asparuhova)
	1–3	21:02 – Stoyanova (Runevska)
	1–4	25:34 – Runevska (Asparuhova)
Molder (Kaareste) – 30:13	2–4
	2–5	34:16 – Runevska (Asparuhova)
	2–6	48:38 – Asparuhova (Runevska)

14 min
Penalties
2 min
34
Shots
32

4 April 2023; 16:30	Ukraine	1–2 (0–0, 0–0, 1–2)	Hong Kong	Olympic Ice Rink, Brașov; Attendance: 80

Game reference

Viktoria Tkachenko
Goalies
Keira Mok
Referee:
(United Kingdom) Emma Sanders
Linesmen:
(Sweden) Julia Hjelmström
(Germany) Julia Strube

	0–1	46:23 – Ip (Ng)
	0–2	50:27 – I. Li (A. Li, Kwok) (PP)
Telehina (Tsymyrenko) – 53:13	1–2

10 min
Penalties
2 min
44
Shots
23

4 April 2023; 20:00	Lithuania	5–2 (2–0, 1–2, 2–0)	Romania	Olympic Ice Rink, Brașov; Attendance: 90

Game reference

Viltė Beličenkaitė
Goalies
Nadina Niciu
Referee:
(Czech Republic) Ilona Novotná
Linesmen:
(Iceland) Elva Hjálmarsdóttir
(France) Laura Peronnin

Miuller (Petrauskaitė) – 03:45	1–0
Miuller (Jatkevičienė) – 07:06	2–0
	2–1	27:56 – David (Csiszér)
Miuller (Tučiūtė) – 29:12	3–1
	3–2	39:59 – Oprea (PS)
Miuller (Rastenytė) (PP) – 57:09	4–2
Petrauskaitė (Rastenytė, Miuller) (EN) – 59:52	5–2

8 min
Penalties
14 min
38
Shots
39

6 April 2023; 13:00	Lithuania	8–2 (1–0, 4–2, 3–0)	Bulgaria	Olympic Ice Rink, Brașov; Attendance: 40

Game reference

Viltė Beličenkaitė
Emilie Simonsen
Goalies
Paulina Georgieva
Petya Simeoneva
Referee:
(South Korea) Lee Kyung-sun
Linesmen:
(France) Laura Peronnin
(Germany) Julia Strube

Miuller – 03:42	1–0
Petrauskaitė (Maleckienė, Miuller) – 20:23	2–0
	2–1	22:26 – Stoyanova (Asparuhova)
Miuller (Jasinevičiūtė) (PP) – 27:55	3–1
	3–2	30:45 – Asparuhova (Kotseva, Stoyanova)
Miuller (Petrauskaitė, Jasinevičiūtė) – 33:13	4–2
Tučiūtė (Jasinevičiūtė, Miuller) (PP) – 38:27	5–2
Jasinevičiūtė (PP) – 44:56	6–2
Jasinevičiūtė (Rakauskaitė) – 56:59	7–2
Tučiūtė – 57:08	8–2

12 min
Penalties
16 min
44
Shots
28

6 April 2023; 16:30	Ukraine	5–0 (3–0, 2–0, 0–0)	Estonia	Olympic Ice Rink, Brașov; Attendance: 200

Game reference

Viktoria Tkachenko
Goalies
Uljana Jeggi
Referee:
(Czech Republic) Ilona Novotná
Linesmen:
(Sweden) Julia Hjelmström
(Netherlands) Amy Keijzers

Tsymyrenko (Telehina, Kyrychenko) (PP) – 11:09	1–0
Tsenova (Les) – 16:45	2–0
Telehina (Tsymyrenko, Dobrovolska) – 17:27	3–0
Lopatina (Maifeld, Les) – 33:46	4–0
Rozhok (Eli. Alipova) (PP) – 39:17	5–0

6 min
Penalties
10 min
79
Shots
10

6 April 2023; 20:00	Romania	1–3 (0–0, 0–1, 1–2)	Hong Kong	Olympic Ice Rink, Brașov; Attendance: 200

Game reference

Nadina Niciu
Goalies
Chau Sumi
Referee:
(Austria) Ulrike Winklmayr
Linesmen:
(Turkey) Elif Bağlar
(Iceland) Elva Hjálmarsdóttir

	0–1	29:56 – T. Wong (C. Wong, Lee)
	0–2	45:46 – Ip (Ng)
Voicu (Máthé) – 55:31	1–2
	1–3	57:31 – I. Li

6 min
Penalties
10 min
47
Shots
26

7 April 2023; 13:00	Bulgaria	3–10 (1–3, 1–3, 1–4)	Ukraine	Olympic Ice Rink, Brașov; Attendance: 100

Game reference

Paulina Georgieva
Goalies
Viktoria Tkachenko
Yuliana Vilhan
Referee:
(United Kingdom) Emma Sanders
Linesmen:
(Turkey) Elif Bağlar
(Germany) Julia Strube

	0–1	00:54 – Eli. Alipova (Ele. Alipova)
Runevska (Stoyanova, Kotseva) – 04:30	1–1
	1–2	08:10 – Eli. Alipova (Ele. Alipova, Rozhok)
	1–3	11:15 – Tsymyrenko (Dobrovolska)
	1–4	28:50 – Kyrychenko (Telehina, Tsymyrenko) (PP)
	1–5	32:51 – Tsymyrenko (Telehina, Kyrychenko)
	1–6	35:21 – Tsymyrenko (Telehina, Dobrovolska)
Asparuhova – 39:05	2–6
Stoyanova (Asparuhova) – 40:12	3–6
	3–7	50:43 – Telehina (Kyrychenko)
	3–8	51:08 – Gutor (Lopatina, Ele. Alipova)
	3–9	52:13 – Telehina (Mashkina)
	3–10	57:07 – Ele. Alipova (Kryvoruchko) (PP2)

12 min
Penalties
10 min
20
Shots
65

7 April 2023; 16:30	Hong Kong	4–5 GWS (1–0, 2–1, 1–3) (OT: 0–0) (SO: 0–1)	Lithuania	Olympic Ice Rink, Brașov; Attendance: 80

Game reference

Keira Mok
Goalies
Emilie Simonsen
Viltė Beličenkaitė
Referee:
(Austria) Ulrike Winklmayr
Linesmen:
(Iceland) Elva Hjálmarsdóttir
(Netherlands) Amy Keijzers

Lam (Yuen) – 02:38	1–0
	1–1	22:15 – Kukanova (Miuller, Petrauskaitė) (PP)
Wang (Leung) – 28:29	2–1
C. Wong (Lee, T. Wong) – 33:33	3–1
T. Wong (Lam, Lee) – 48:38	4–1
	4–2	52:59 – Jasinevičiūtė (Kukanova)
	4–3	53:46 – Miuller (Petrauskaitė)
	4–4	55:35 – Miuller (Rakauskaitė)

T. Wong (miss)
Ng
C. Wong (miss)
Lam (miss)
Shootout
(miss) Miuller
(miss) Jasinevičiūtė
Tučiūtė
Rastenytė
Kukanova
10 min
Penalties
4 min
38
Shots
42

7 April 2023; 20:00	Estonia	0–4 (0–0, 0–0, 0–4)	Romania	Olympic Ice Rink, Brașov; Attendance: 200

Game reference

Uljana Jeggi
Goalies
Nadina Niciu
Referee:
(South Korea) Lee Kyung-sun
Linesmen:
(Sweden) Julia Hjelmström
(France) Laura Peronnin

0–1	40:28 – Barbul (Máthé, Voicu) (PP)
0–2	41:37 – Simina (Oprea, Noémi)
0–3	44:46 – Voicu (David)
0–4	47:13 – Barbul (Voicu, David) (PP)

8 min
Penalties
18 min
26
Shots
51

9 April 2023; 13:00	Hong Kong	3–0 (1–0, 0–0, 2–0)	Estonia	Olympic Ice Rink, Brașov; Attendance: 50

Game reference

Chau Sumi
Goalies
Sofia Salamatina
Referee:
(Czech Republic) Ilona Novotná
Linesmen:
(Turkey) Elif Bağlar
(France) Laura Peronnin

T. Wong (Ip) (PP) – 09:44	1–0
C. Wong (T. Wong) – 47:59	2–0
Ip (Ng, Leung) (PP) – 57:12	3–0

10 min
Penalties
8 min
45
Shots
18

9 April 2023; 16:30	Ukraine	2–1 (0–0, 1–0, 1–1)	Lithuania	Olympic Ice Rink, Brașov; Attendance: 430

Game reference

Viktoria Tkachenko
Goalies
Viltė Beličenkaitė
Referee:
(Austria) Ulrike Winklmayr
Linesmen:
(Netherlands) Amy Keijzers
(Germany) Julia Strube

Zahrekova (Tsenova, Les) – 33:07	1–0
	1–1	42:16 – Petrauskaitė (Jasinevičiūtė, Miuller)
Tsenova (Zahrekova, Izmailova) – 53:45	2–1

12 min
Penalties
4 min
35
Shots
36

9 April 2023; 20:00	Romania	10–2 (1–1, 2–0, 7–1)	Bulgaria	Olympic Ice Rink, Brașov; Attendance: 250

Game reference

Andrea Laczkó
Goalies
Paulina Georgieva
Referee:
(United Kingdom) Emma Sanders
Linesmen:
(Iceland) Elva Hjálmarsdóttir
(Sweden) Julia Hjelmström

	0–1	05:42 – Asparuhova (Dilova)
Voicu (Popescu, David) – 00:47	1–1
Oprea (Bálint) – 22:35	2–1
Voicu (Kulla, Adam) (SH) – 24:41	3–1
	3–2	40:45 – Runevska
Voicu (Barbul) – 55:53	4–2
David (Máthé, Csiszér) (PP) – 49:23	5–2
Voicu (Barbul, Popescu) (PP) – 51:09	6–2
David (Adam) (PP) – 51:33	7–2
Voicu (David, Barbul) – 55:53	8–2
Bálint (Rácz) – 58:30	9–2
Simina (Ónodi, Oprea) – 59:31	10–2

265 min
Penalties
289 min
72
Shots
12

=== Statistics ===
==== Scoring leaders ====
List shows the top skaters sorted by points, then goals.

Player	GP	G	A	Pts	+/−	PIM	POS
(Lithuania) Klara Miuller	5	13	5	18	+11	0	F
(Bulgaria) Simona Asparuhova	5	5	6	11	−2	43	F
(Romania) Ana Voicu	5	7	2	9	+1	10	F
(Bulgaria) Stefani Stoyanova	5	5	4	9	+1	27	F
(Ukraine) Polina Telehina	5	5	4	9	+6	4	F
(Lithuania) Viltautė Jasinevičiūtė	5	4	5	9	−2	4	F
(Ukraine) Daria Tsymyrenko	5	4	5	9	+7	2	F
(Lithuania) Gabija Petrauskaitė	5	3	6	9	+8	2	F
(Hong Kong) Estelle Ip	5	5	2	7	+4	2	F
(Bulgaria) Maria Runevska	5	4	3	7	+2	27	F

GP = Games played; G = Goals; A = Assists; Pts = Points; +/− = Plus/Minus; PIM = Penalties in Minutes; POS = Position
Source: IIHF.com

==== Goaltending leaders ====
Only the top five goaltenders, based on save percentage, who have played at least 40% of their team's minutes, are included in this list.

Player	TOI	GA	GAA	SA	Sv%	SO
(Hong Kong) Chau Sumi	180:00	3	1.00	79	96.20	1
(Ukraine) Viktoria Tkachenko	294:19	6	1.22	108	94.44	2
(Hong Kong) Keira Mok	125:00	5	2.40	85	94.12	0
(Lithuania) Viltė Beličenkaitė	231:02	7	1.82	118	94.07	0
(Romania) Nadina Niciu	238:04	11	2.77	148	92.57	1

TOI = time on ice (minutes:seconds); SA = shots against; GA = goals against; GAA = goals against average; Sv% = save percentage; SO = shutouts
Source: IIHF.com

=== Awards ===
Position	Player
Goaltender	(Hong Kong) Keira Mok
Defenceman	(Ukraine) Tetiana Kyrychenko
Forward	(Lithuania) Klara Miuller

== Group B tournament ==
2023 IIHF Women's World Championship Division III B

Tournament details
- Host country: Israel
- City: Tnuvot
- Venue: 1 (in 1 host city)
- Dates: 26–31 March
- Teams: 3

Tournament statistics
- Games played: 6
- Goals scored: 50 (8.33 per game)
- Attendance: 855 (143 per game)
- Scoring leader: (Serbia) Valentina Vrhoci (14 points)

Official website
- Website

The Division III Group B tournament was played in Tnuvot, Israel, from 26 to 31 March 2023.

=== Participating teams ===
Team	Qualification
Serbia	Placed 2nd in Division III B last year.
Bosnia and Herzegovina	Placed 3rd in Division III B last year.
Israel	Hosts; placed 4th in Division III B last year.

=== Match officials ===
Two referees and three linesmen were selected for the tournament.

Referees	Linesmen
(Australia) Cien Pereira; (Switzerland) Drahomira Fialova	(Norway) Mildrid Johnsen; (Singapore) Serena Tsang; (Slovenia) Katja Mrak

=== Final standings ===
Pos	Team	Pld	W	OTW	OTL	L	GF	GA	GD	Pts	Promotion
1	Serbia	4	4	0	0	0	37	2	+35	12	Promoted to the 2024 Division III A
2	Israel (H)	4	1	0	0	3	7	19	−12	3	
3	Bosnia and Herzegovina	4	1	0	0	3	6	29	−23	3	

Source: IIHF
Rules for classification: 1) points; 2) head-to-head points; 3) head-to-head goal difference; 4) head-to-head number of goals scored; 5) result against closest best-ranked team outside tied teams; 6) result against second-best ranked team outside tied teams; 7) seeding before tournament.
(H) Host

=== Match results ===
All times are local (Israel Summer Time – UTC+3)

26 March 2023; 19:00	Serbia	5–1 (1–0, 2–0, 2–1)	Israel	OneIce Arena, Tnuvot; Attendance: 150

Game reference

Jovana Korica
Goalies
Yael Fatiev
Shelly Zilkha
Referee:
(Switzerland) Drahomira Fialova
Linesmen:
(Norway) Mildrid Johnsen
(Slovenia) Katja Mrak

Popov (Radović) – 07:48	1–0
Čizmić (H. Rac Sabo) – 29:02	2–0
Vrhoci (Ilić) – 29:55	3–0
Velček (Vrhoci) – 45:13	4–0
	4–1	53:29 – Kotler (Armoza, Dar)
Vastag (Vrhoci, Velček]) – 59:16	5–1

8 min
Penalties
6 min
37
Shots
7

27 March 2023; 19:00	Israel	2–4 (0–0, 2–2, 0–2)	Bosnia and Herzegovina	OneIce Arena, Tnuvot; Attendance: 182

Game reference

Yael Fatiev
Goalies
Hana Sadović
Asja Abdomerović
Referee:
(Australia) Cien Pereira
Linesmen:
(Slovenia) Katja Mrak
(Singapore) Serena Tsang

	0–1	28:02 – Kapić (Karamehmedović)
Dar (Basov, Kotler) (PP2) – 33:26	1–1
	1–2	35:54 – Kapić
Armoza (Kotler, Basov) – 36:49	2–2
	2–3	45:02 – Kapić
	2–4	50:47 – Karamehmedović (Muharemović, Kokaj) (PP)

8 min
Penalties
12 min
26
Shots
34

28 March 2023; 19:00	Serbia	12–1 (5–0, 4–0, 3–1)	Bosnia and Herzegovina	OneIce Arena, Tnuvot; Attendance: 52

Game reference

Jovana Korica
Sanela Ćormaković
Goalies
Hana Sadović
Asja Abdomerović
Referee:
(Switzerland) Drahomira Fialova
Linesmen:
(Norway) Mildrid Johnsen
(Singapore) Serena Tsang

Benčić (Velček) – 01:57	1–0
Vrhoci (Gladić) – 03:02	2–0
Popov (Vrhoci, Vastag) – 09:35	3–0
Popov (Vastag, Katarić) – 19:04	4–0
Vastag (Vrhoci) – 19:36	5–0
H. Rac Sabo (Čizmić) (PP) – 27:40	6–0
Vrhoci Popov, Vastag) – 29:52	7–0
Čizmić (Benčić) – 32:09	8–0
Velček (Vrhoci) – 36:31	9–0
Čizmić (H. Rac Sabo) – 42:24	10–0
	10–1	43:12 – Zajimović (Kapić)
Popov (Velček) – 57:04	11–1
Čizmić (H. Rac Sabo) – 57:18	12–1

10 min
Penalties
10 min
47
Shots
19

29 March 2023; 19:00	Israel	0–9 (0–3, 0–2, 0–4)	Serbia	OneIce Arena, Tnuvot; Attendance: 137

Game reference

Shelly Zilkha
Goalies
Jovana Korica
Sanela Ćormaković
Referee:
(Australia) Cien Pereira
Linesmen:
(Norway) Mildrid Johnsen
(Slovenia) Katja Mrak

0–1	11:02 – Velček (Ivanov) (PP)
0–2	13:47 – Vrhoci (Gladić)
0–3	15:20 – Radović (L. Rac Sabo)
0–4	21:02 – Vrhoci (Vučković, Velček) (PP)
0–5	34:17 – Vastag (Radović) (SH)
0–6	48:02 – Sekulić (Radović, Velček) (PP2)
0–7	49:30 – Vučković (Čizmić)
0–8	50:32 – Milodanović (Sekulić)
0–9	51:36 – Vrhoci

14 min
Penalties
10 min
8
Shots
66

30 March 2023; 17:00	Bosnia and Herzegovina	1–4 (0–1, 0–0, 1–3)	Israel	OneIce Arena, Tnuvot; Attendance: 201

Game reference

Hana Sadović
Goalies
Yael Fatiev
Referee:
(Switzerland) Drahomira Fialova
Linesmen:
(Slovenia) Katja Mrak
(Singapore) Serena Tsang

	0–1	00:49 – Basov
	0–2	43:06 – Zioni (Adivi)
Šopović (Kapić) – 43:58	1–2
	1–3	45:56 – Armoza (Kotler, Basov)
	1–4	50:24 – Kotler (Dar)

14 min
Penalties
6 min
30
Shots
17

31 March 2023; 14:00	Bosnia and Herzegovina	0–11 (0–4, 0–2, 0–5)	Serbia	OneIce Arena, Tnuvot; Attendance: 133

Game reference

Hana Sadović
Goalies
Jovana Korica
Referee:
(Australia) Cien Pereira
Linesmen:
(Norway) Mildrid Johnsen
(Singapore) Serena Tsang

0–1	09:27 – H. Rac Sabo (Čizmić)
0–2	15:53 – Vrhoci (Vastag) (SH)
0–3	18:18 – Stantić (H. Rac Sabo, Milišić)
0–4	19:48 – Vrhoci (Radović) (PP)
0–5	26:17 – Ivanov (Radović) (SH)
0–6	34:40 – Ivanov (Sekulić) (PP)
0–7	44:34 – Vrhoci (Popov, Vastag)
0–8	55:20 – Popov (Velček, L. Rac Sabo)
0–9	56:02 – Radović (L. Rac Sabo)
0–10	57:37 – Gladić (Katarić)
0–11	58:30 – Vrhoci (Vastag) (SH)

12 min
Penalties
18 min
12
Shots
54

=== Statistics ===
==== Scoring leaders ====
List shows the top skaters sorted by points, then goals.

Player	GP	G	A	Pts	+/−	PIM	POS
(Serbia) Valentina Vrhoci	4	10	4	14	+15	0	F
(Serbia) Milica Velček	4	3	7	10	+8	10	F
(Serbia) Ivett Vastag	4	3	6	9	+15	0	F
(Serbia) Katarina Čizmić	4	5	2	7	+6	4	F
(Serbia) Jovana Popov	4	5	2	7	+11	4	F
(Bosnia and Herzegovina) Irma Kapić	4	3	3	6	−9	2	F
(Serbia) Hanna Rac Sabo	4	2	4	6	+5	0	F
(Serbia) Jana Radović	4	2	4	6	+6	4	F
(Israel) Shani Kotler	4	2	3	5	0	0	F
(Israel) Pnina Basov	4	1	3	4	−3	0	F

GP = Games played; G = Goals; A = Assists; Pts = Points; +/− = Plus/Minus; PIM = Penalties in Minutes; POS = Position
Source: IIHF.com

==== Goaltending leaders ====
Only the top five goaltenders, based on save percentage, who have played at least 40% of their team's minutes, are included in this list.

Player	TOI	GA	GAA	SA	Sv%	SO
(Serbia) Jovana Korica	229:32	2	0.52	42	95.24	1
(Israel) Yael Fatiev	173:29	9	3.11	96	90.62	0
(Bosnia and Herzegovina) Hana Sadović	230:07	28	7.30	143	80.42	0

TOI = time on ice (minutes:seconds); SA = shots against; GA = goals against; GAA = goals against average; Sv% = save percentage; SO = shutouts
Source: IIHF.com

=== Awards ===
Position	Player
Goaltender	(Israel) Yael Fatiev
Defenceman	(Bosnia and Herzegovina) Amila Šoše
Forward	(Serbia) Milica Velček
