= 2020 Women's Ice Hockey World Championships =

Tournament details
- Host countries: Iceland; Bulgaria
- Venues: 2 (in 2 host cities)
- Teams: 12

The 2020 Women's Ice Hockey World Championships were the 23rd such series of tournaments organized by the International Ice Hockey Federation. Teams were supposed to play at six tiers of competition. However, four of the six tournaments were cancelled due to the COVID-19 pandemic. The competition also served as qualifications for the 2021 competition and finalized seeding for the 2022 Winter Olympics qualification.

== Championship (Top Division) ==
The tournament would have been played in Halifax and Truro, Nova Scotia, Canada, from 31 March to 10 April 2020. It was cancelled on 7 March 2020 due to the COVID-19 pandemic. The women's national ice hockey teams of Canada, Finland, Russia, Switzerland, and the United States were scheduled to compete in Group A; the national teams of the Czech Republic, Denmark, Germany, Hungary, and Japan were scheduled to compete in Group B.

== Division I ==
=== Division I Group A ===
The Division I Group A tournament would have been played in Angers, France, from 12 to 18 April 2020. It was cancelled on 7 March 2020 due to the coronavirus outbreak. The women's national teams of Austria, France, the Netherlands, Norway, Slovakia, and Sweden were scheduled to compete in the tournament.

=== Division I Group B ===
The Division I Group B tournament would have been played in Katowice, Poland, from 28 March to 3 April 2020. On 2 March 2020, the tournament was cancelled due to the coronavirus outbreak. The women's national teams of China, Italy, Kazakhstan, Poland, Slovenia, and South Korea were scheduled to compete in the tournament.

== Division II ==
=== Division II Group A ===
The Division II Group A tournament would have been played in Jaca, Spain, from 29 March to 4 April 2020. On 2 March 2020, the tournament was cancelled due to the COVID-19 pandemic. The women's national teams of Chinese Taipei, Great Britain, Latvia, Mexico, DPR Korea, and Spain were scheduled to compete in the tournament.

=== Division II Group B ===
The Division II Group B tournament was played in Akureyri, Iceland, from 23 to 29 February 2020.

Pos	Team	Pld	W	OTW	OTL	L	GF	GA	GD	Pts	Relegation
1	Australia (Note: Australia were originally promoted to Division II A, however, that promotion was rescinded due to the COVID-19 pandemic.)	5	5	0	0	0	39	4	+35	15	
2	Iceland (H)	5	4	0	0	1	25	7	+18	12	
3	New Zealand	5	3	0	0	2	20	16	+4	9	
4	Turkey	5	1	1	0	3	10	14	−4	5	
5	Croatia	5	0	1	0	4	5	39	−34	2 (Note: Croatia 2–1 (GWS) Ukraine)	
6	Ukraine	5	0	0	2	3	7	26	−19	2	Relegated to the 2022 Division III

Source: IIHF
Rules for classification: 1) points; 2) head-to-head points; 3) head-to-head goal difference; 4) head-to-head number of goals scored; 5) result against closest best-ranked team outside tied teams; 6) result against second-best ranked team outside tied teams; 7) seeding before tournament.
(H) Host

== Division III ==
The Division III tournament was played in Sofia, Bulgaria, from 4 to 10 December 2019.

Pos	Team	Pld	W	OTW	OTL	L	GF	GA	GD	Pts	Promotion
1	South Africa	5	4	0	0	1	16	18	−2	12	Promoted to the 2022 Division II B
2	Belgium	5	3	0	0	2	22	13	+9	9 (Note: Romania 2–4 Belgium)	
3	Romania	5	2	1	1	1	22	15	+7	9	
4	Bulgaria (H)	5	2	1	0	2	14	10	+4	8	
5	Lithuania	5	2	0	0	3	13	14	−1	6	
6	Hong Kong	5	0	0	1	4	4	21	−17	1	

Source: IIHF
Rules for classification: 1) points; 2) head-to-head points; 3) head-to-head goal difference; 4) head-to-head number of goals scored; 5) result against closest best-ranked team outside tied teams; 6) result against second-best ranked team outside tied teams; 7) seeding before tournament.
(H) Host
