= Israel women's national ice hockey team =

Israel
- Association: Ice Hockey Federation of Israel
- General manager: Keren Brauner
- Head coach: Melissa Wronzberg
- Assistants: Yuval Halpert; Michael Mazeika
- Captain: Liv Sharabi
- Most games: Pnina Basov; Shani Kotler (20)
- Top scorer: Lior Leshem (23)
- Most points: Lior Leshem (29)
- IIHF code: ISR

Ranking
- Current IIHF: 42 (3 June 2026)
- Highest IIHF: 44 (first in 2022)
- Lowest IIHF: 44 (first in 2022)

First international
- Bosnia and Herzegovina 5–1 Israel (Belgrade, Serbia; 22 March 2022)

Biggest win
- Israel 11–0 Singapore (Kohtla-Järve, Estonia; 28 February 2026)

Biggest defeat
- Estonia 10–0 Israel (Belgrade, Serbia; 23 March 2022)

World Championships
- Appearances: 5 (first in 2022)
- Best result: 38th (2022)

International record (W–L–T)
- 8–12–0

The Israel women's national ice hockey team is the women's national ice hockey team of Israel.

== History ==
The team first played in an international tournament at the 2022 IIHF Women's World Championship Division III.

== World Championship record ==
- 2022 – Finished in 38th place (2nd in Division IIIB)
- 2023 – Finished in 40th place (2nd in Division IIIB)
- 2024 – Finished in 43rd place (3rd in Division IIIB)
- 2025 – Finished in 42nd place (2nd in Division IIIB)
- 2026 – Finished in 44th place (4th in Division IIIB)
