= Estonia national ice hockey team =

Estonia national ice hockey team may refer to:

- Estonia men's national ice hockey team
  - Estonia men's national junior ice hockey team
  - Estonia men's national under-18 ice hockey team
- Estonia women's national ice hockey team
