= 2025 IIHF Women's World Championship Division III =

Tournament details
- Host countries: Serbia; Bosnia and Herzegovina
- Venues: 2 (in 2 host cities)
- Dates: 2–8 March; 13–18 February
- Teams: 11

The 2025 IIHF Women's World Championship Division III consisted of two international ice hockey tournaments organized by the International Ice Hockey Federation (IIHF). Divisions III A and III B represent the sixth and the seventh tier of the 2025 Women's Ice Hockey World Championships.

Group A was held in Belgrade, Serbia, from 2 to 8 March 2025 and Group B in Sarajevo, Bosnia and Herzegovina, from 13 to 18 February 2025.

== Group A tournament ==
2025 IIHF Women's World Championship Division III A

Tournament details
- Host country: Serbia
- Venue: 1 (in 1 host city)
- Dates: 2–8 March
- Teams: 6

Tournament statistics
- Games played: 15
- Goals scored: 94 (6.27 per game)
- Attendance: 2,585 (172 per game)
- Scoring leader: (Romania) Edit Szekeres (13 points)

Official website
- Website

=== Participants ===
Team	Qualification
South Africa	Placed 6th in 2024 Division II B and was relegated.
Romania	Placed 2nd in 2024 Division III A.
Lithuania	Placed 3rd in 2024 Division III A.
Serbia	Host, placed 4th in 2024 Division III A.
Croatia	Placed 5th in 2024 Division III A.
Thailand	Placed 1st in 2024 Division III B and was promoted.

=== Match officials ===
Four referees and seven linesmen were selected for the tournament.

Referees	Linesmen
(China) Song Meina; (Japan) Mai Mizuhori; (New Zealand) Ashleigh Davidson; (Norway) Alina Hove	(Finland) Salla Raitala; (United Kingdom) Charlotte Cramp; (Italy) Chiara Iori; (Japan) Rinka Kubota; (Serbia) Dana Ilić; (Sweden) Wilma Westlund; (Switzerland) Tamara Perrin

=== Standings ===
Pos	Team	Pld	W	OTW	OTL	L	GF	GA	GD	Pts	Promotion or relegation
1	Lithuania	5	3	1	0	1	20	8	+12	11	Promoted to the 2026 Division II B
2	Thailand	5	3	0	1	1	16	9	+7	10	
3	Serbia (H)	5	3	0	0	2	15	10	+5	9 (Note: Serbia 2–0 Romania)	
4	Romania	5	3	0	0	2	19	11	+8	9	
5	Croatia	5	2	0	0	3	13	13	0	6	
6	South Africa	5	0	0	0	5	11	43	−32	0	Relegated to the 2026 Division III B

Source: IIHF
Rules for classification: 1) points; 2) head-to-head points; 3) head-to-head goal difference; 4) head-to-head number of goals scored; 5) result against closest best-ranked team outside tied teams; 6) result against second-best ranked team outside tied teams; 7) seeding before tournament.
(H) Host

=== Results ===
All times are local (UTC+1).

2 March 2025; 12:30	Lithuania	10–3 (3–1, 6–2, 1–0)	South Africa	Pionir Ice Hall, Belgrade; Attendance: 33

Game reference

Viltė Beličenkaitė
Milėja Girkontaitė
Goalies
Shaylene Rorke
Referee:
(New Zealand) Ashleigh Davidson
Linesmen:
(United Kingdom) Charlotte Cramp
(Japan) Rinka Kubota

Jasinevičiūtė (Rakauskaitė, Miuller) – 04:21	1–0
Miuller (Jasinevičiūtė, Tučiūtė) (PP) – 07:46	2–0
	2–1	15:21 – Van Doesburgh (PS)
Miuller (Jasinevičiūtė, Tučiūtė) – 15:41	3–1
Vyšniauskaitė (Kondratjeva, Griniūtė) – 22:05	4–1
Orvide (Jasinevičiūtė) – 24:02	5–1
Rastenytė (Vyšniauskaitė, Kondratjeva (PP) – 30:46	6–1
Butkina (Jatkevičienė) – 31:15	7–1
	7–2	31:41 – Rhode (D'Oliveira, Lechtanski)
Petrauskaitė – 31:49	8–2
	8–3	33:23 – Rhode (D'Oliveira, Els)
Miuller (Jasinevičiūtė, Tučiūtė) – 36:44	9–3
Petrauskaitė (Rakauskaitė, Miuller) (PP) – 59:27	10–3

4 min
Penalties
12 min
45
Shots
19

2 March 2025; 16:00	Romania	4–3 (0–0, 2–1, 2–2)	Croatia	Pionir Ice Hall, Belgrade; Attendance: 29

Game reference

Nadina Niciu
Goalies
Klara Kolar
Referee:
(Norway) Alina Hove
Linesmen:
(Serbia) Dana Ilić
(Finland) Salla Raitala

Szekeres (Vitos, Bende) – 22:36	1–0
	1–1	25:06 – Čavka (Bauman, Soldić)
Voicu (Barbul, Mathe) – 26:38	2–1
	2–2	49:59 – Stolar (Čavka) (PP)
Bende (Szekeres) – 50:07	3–2
Szekeres (SH) – 57:25	4–2
	4–3	58:28 – Benzon (Matak) (PP)

12 min
Penalties
6 min
25
Shots
23

2 March 2025; 19:30	Thailand	3–4 (0–1, 2–2, 1–1)	Serbia	Pionir Ice Hall, Belgrade; Attendance: 536

Game reference

Thamida Kunthadapakorn
Goalies
Ana Ilić
Referee:
(China) Song Meina
Linesmen:
(Italy) Chiara Iori
(Switzerland) Tamara Perrin

	0–1	04:01 – Popov (Vastag, Ivanov) (PP)
	0–2	24:01 – Vastag (Vukelić)
Yannakornthanapun (Thamma, Satityathiwat) – 30:01	1–2
	1–3	30:43 – Sekulić (Rác Szabó, Vučković)
Thamma (Jittresin, Panyamaneerat) – 37:16	2–3
Yannakornthanapun (Satityathiwat, Dejthai) – 42:36	3–3
	3–4	58:17 – Vastag

6 min
Penalties
6 min
30
Shots
26

3 March 2025; 12:30	Romania	2–1 (0–1, 1–0, 1–0)	Lithuania	Pionir Ice Hall, Belgrade; Attendance: 26

Game reference

Nadina Niciu
Goalies
Viltė Beličenkaitė
Referee:
(China) Song Meina
Linesmen:
(Serbia) Dana Ilić
(Sweden) Wilma Westlund

	0–1	05:20 – Petrauskaitė (Jasinevičiūtė, Miuller)
Bende (Szekeres, Barbul) – 33:41	1–1
Szekeres (PP) – 51:53	2–1

6 min
Penalties
4 min
33
Shots
34

3 March 2025; 16:00	Croatia	0–3 (0–2, 0–1, 0–0)	Thailand	Pionir Ice Hall, Belgrade; Attendance: 23

Game reference

Klara Kolar
Goalies
Thamida Kunthadapakorn
Referee:
(New Zealand) Ashleigh Davidson
Linesmen:
(Japan) Rinka Kubota
(Switzerland) Tamara Perrin

0–1	07:38 – Kosanunt (SH)
0–2	10:59 – Panyamaneerat (Chimpradid)
0–3	39:40 – Yannakornthanapunt (Satityathiwat)

10 min
Penalties
6 min
17
Shots
22

3 March 2025; 19:30	South Africa	3–9 (1–2, 1–4, 1–3)	Serbia	Pionir Ice Hall, Belgrade; Attendance: 176

Game reference

Shaylene Rorke
Akaisha Mc Namara
Goalies
Ana Ilić
Sanela Ćormaković
Referee:
(Japan) Mai Mizuhori
Linesmen:
(Italy) Chiara Iori
(Finland) Salla Raitala

	0–1	08:51 – Vukelić (Vrhoci, Ivanov)
	0–2	12:32 – Vukelić (Čizmić, Vrhoci)
Rhode (Kruger, D'Oliveira) – 15:11	1–2
	1–3	23:48 – Vasiljević (Popov, Sekulić)
	1–4	24:20 – Čizmić (Vukelić, Milišić)
Rhode (D'Oliveira) – 31:09	2–4
	2–5	33:40 – Vukelić (Vasiljević) (SH)
	2–6	35:32 – Popov (Velcek, Vasiljević)
	2–7	52:23 – Čizmić (Benčić, Vukelić) (PP)
	2–8	54:15 – Vastag (Radović, Mandić)
Botha (Retief) – 57:08	3–8
	3–9	57:08 – Rác Szabó (Radović, Vasiljević)

6 min
Penalties
10 min
16
Shots
45

5 March 2025; 12:30	South Africa	2–7 (1–1, 0–5, 1–1)	Croatia	Pionir Ice Hall, Belgrade; Attendance: 34

Game reference

Shaylene Rorke
Goalies
Klara Kolar
Referee:
(Norway) Alina Hove
Linesmen:
(Italy) Chiara Iori
(Switzerland) Tamara Perrin

Jamieson (Van Doesburgh, Herringer) (PP) – 13:20	1–0
	1–1	19:07 – Stolar (PP)
	1–2	21:30 – Soldić (Bauman, Čavka)
	1–3	27:12 – Stolar
	1–4	35:38 – Marinković (Matak, Vukelić) (PP)
	1–5	36:34 – Bauman
	1–6	36:50 – Marinkovic
Els – 55:45	2–6
	2–7	57:23 – Soldić (Bauman)

14 min
Penalties
6 min
20
Shots
38

5 March 2025; 16:00	Romania	2–3 (1–2, 1–0, 0–1)	Thailand	Pionir Ice Hall, Belgrade; Attendance: 31

Game reference

Stefania Bojian
Goalies
Thamida Kunthadapakorn
Referee:
(New Zealand) Ashleigh Davidson
Linesmen:
(Serbia) Dana Ilić
(Japan) Rinka Kubota

Vitos (Szekeres, Mathe) (PP) – 05:24	1–0
	1–1	08:10 – Panyamaneerat (Thanyalakpark, Thamma) (PP2)
	1–2	08:58 – Thanyalakpark (Thanyalakpark, Satityathiwat) (PP)
Szekeres (PS) – 28:41	2–2
	2–3	59:12 – Pothang (Thamma) (PP)

12 min
Penalties
10 min
32
Shots
27

5 March 2025; 19:30	Lithuania	3–0 (0–0, 2–0, 1–0)	Serbia	Pionir Ice Hall, Belgrade; Attendance: 476

Game reference

Viltė Beličenkaitė
Goalies
Ana Ilić
Referee:
(Japan) Mai Mizuhori
Linesmen:
(United Kingdom) Charlotte Cramp
(Sweden) Wilma Westlund

Vyšniauskaitė (Miuller, Kukanova) – 23:23	1–0
Miuller (Tučiūtė) – 37:20	2–0
Vyšniauskaitė (ENG) – 56:30	3–0

8 min
Penalties
8 min
48
Shots
34

6 March 2025; 12:30	Thailand	6–1 (2–0, 2–0, 2–1)	South Africa	Pionir Ice Hall, Belgrade; Attendance: 17

Game reference

Thamida Kunthadapakorn
Goalies
Akaisha Mc Namara
Referee:
(China) Song Meina
Linesmen:
(United Kingdom) Charlotte Cramp
(Japan) Rinka Kubota

Yannakornthanapunt (Thanyalakpark, Satityathiwat) (PP) – 05:07	1–0
Thamma (Panyamaneerat, Chimpradid) – 12:51	2–0
Satityathiwat (Kosanunt) – 21:11	3–0
Jittresin (Yannakornthanapunt) – 27:43	4–0
	4–1	46:58 – D'Oliveira (Grant)
Satityathiwat (Thamma, Thanyalakpark) (PP) – 50:33	5–1
Pothang (Yannakornthanapunt) – 56:16	6–1

6 min
Penalties
8 min
33
Shots
12

6 March 2025; 16:00	Croatia	2–4 (2–3, 0–1, 0–0)	Lithuania	Pionir Ice Hall, Belgrade; Attendance: 37

Game reference

Viltė Beličenkaitė
Goalies
Klara Kolar
Referee:
(Japan) Mai Mizuhori
Linesmen:
(Serbia) Dana Ilić
(Finland) Salla Raitala

	0–1	00:19 – Miuller (Jasinevičiūtė, Petrauskaitė)
	0–2	05:36 – Tučiūtė (Jasinevičiūtė, Petrauskaitė) (PP)
	0–3	07:55 – Jasinevičiūtė (Miuller)
Bauman (Čavka, Soldić) – 09:00	1–3
Soldić – 14:41	2–3
	2–4	37:32 – Tučiūtė (Kukanova, Miuller) (PP)

6 min
Penalties
4 min
25
Shots
13

6 March 2025; 19:30	Serbia	2–0 (0–0, 1–0, 1–0)	Romania	Pionir Ice Hall, Belgrade; Attendance: 367

Game reference
Ana Ilić	Goalies	Nadina Niciu	Referee: (Norway) Alina Hove; Linesmen: (Switzerland) Tamara Perrin (Sweden) Wilma Westlund
Čizmić (Vrhoci, Mandić) – 23:52 / 1–0; Velcek (Vrhoci, Benčić) (PP) – 52:35 / 2–0			Referee: (Norway) Alina Hove; Linesmen: (Switzerland) Tamara Perrin (Sweden) Wilma Westlund
4 min	Penalties	10 min	Referee: (Norway) Alina Hove; Linesmen: (Switzerland) Tamara Perrin (Sweden) Wilma Westlund
14	Shots	33	Referee: (Norway) Alina Hove; Linesmen: (Switzerland) Tamara Perrin (Sweden) Wilma Westlund

8 March 2025; 12:30	Lithuania	2–1 OT (0–1, 0–0, 1–0) (OT: 1–0)	Thailand	Pionir Ice Hall, Belgrade; Attendance: 29

Game reference

Viltė Beličenkaitė
Goalies
Thamida Kunthadapakorn
Referee:
(New Zealand) Ashleigh Davidson
Linesmen:
(Finland) Salla Raitala
(Sweden) Wilma Westlund

	0–1	09:08 – Poka (Panyamaneerat, Thamma)
Petrauskaitė (Kukanova, Jasinevičiūtė) (PP) – 48:00	1–1
Miuller (Tučiūtė) (SH) – 62:37	2–1

12 min
Penalties
2 min
25
Shots
25

8 March 2025; 16:00	South Africa	2–11 (1–3, 0–3, 1–5)	Romania	Pionir Ice Hall, Belgrade; Attendance: 37

Game reference

Shaylene Rorke
Akaisha Mc Namara
Goalies
Nadina Niciu
Stefania Bojian
Referee:
(Japan) Mai Mizuhori
Linesmen:
(United Kingdom) Charlotte Cramp
(Serbia) Dana Ilić

	0–1	04:51 – Szekeres (Mathe, Bende)
	0–2	07:59 – Barbul (Bende, Szekeres) (PP)
	0–3	13:44 – Vasile (PP)
Van Doesburgh – 14:28	1–3
	1–4	23:38 – Szekeres (Bende)
	1–5	35:38 – Vitos (Bende, Ádám)
	1–6	36:37 – Voicu (Csiszér, Bálint)
	1–7	41:02 – Bende (Szekeres)
Els – 41:35	2–7
	2–8	44:31 – Bende (Szekeres, Vitos)
	2–9	45:57 – Simina (Mihai, David)
	2–10	47:58 – Szekeres (Vitos, Bende)
	2–11	55:15 – Barbul

6 min
Penalties
6 min
11
Shots
49

8 March 2025; 19:30	Serbia	0–1 (0–0, 0–0, 0–1)	Croatia	Pionir Ice Hall, Belgrade; Attendance: 734

Game reference
Ana Ilić	Goalies	Klara Kolar	Referee: (Norway) Alina Hove; Linesmen: (Italy) Chiara Iori (Japan) Rinka Kubota
0–1 / 42:12 – Stolar (Čavka, Vlašić) (PP)			Referee: (Norway) Alina Hove; Linesmen: (Italy) Chiara Iori (Japan) Rinka Kubota
10 min	Penalties	10 min	Referee: (Norway) Alina Hove; Linesmen: (Italy) Chiara Iori (Japan) Rinka Kubota
14	Shots	24	Referee: (Norway) Alina Hove; Linesmen: (Italy) Chiara Iori (Japan) Rinka Kubota

=== Statistics ===
==== Scoring leaders ====
List shows the top skaters sorted by points, then goals.

Player	GP	G	A	Pts	+/−	PIM	POS
(Romania) Edit Szekeres	5	7	6	13	+11	0	F
(Lithuania) Klara Miuller	5	6	6	12	+8	4	F
(Lithuania) Viltautė Jasinevičiūtė	5	2	9	11	+9	0	F
(Romania) Julia Bende	5	4	6	10	+11	8	F
(Thailand) Thitaree Satityathiwat	5	2	6	8	+4	0	F
(Thailand) Supitsara Thamma	5	2	5	8	+3	2	F
(Lithuania) Emilija Tučiūtė	5	2	5	7	+7	2	D
(Lithuania) Gabija Petrauskaitė	5	4	2	6	+5	4	F
(Thailand) Thipwarintorn Yannakornthanapun	5	4	2	6	+3	2	F
(Serbia) Jana Vukelić	5	3	3	6	+3	0	F

GP = Games played; G = Goals; A = Assists; Pts = Points; +/− = Plus/Minus; PIM = Penalties in Minutes; POS = Position
Source: IIHF.com

==== Goaltending leaders ====
Only the top five goaltenders, based on save percentage, who have played at least 40% of their team's minutes, are included in this list.

Player	TOI	GA	GAA	SA	Sv%	SO
(Serbia) Ana Ilić	291:50	8	1.64	147	94.56	1
(Lithuania) Viltė Beličenkaitė	281:35	8	1.70	133	93.98	1
(Thailand) Thamida Kunthadapakorn	302:37	9	1.78	112	91.96	1
(Romania) Nadina Niciu	180:11	6	2.00	72	91.67	0
(Croatia) Klara Kolar	290:51	12	2.48	89	86.52	1

TOI = time on ice (minutes:seconds); SA = shots against; GA = goals against; GAA = goals against average; Sv% = save percentage; SO = shutouts
Source: IIHF.com

=== Awards ===
Position	Player
Goaltender	(Serbia) Ana Ilić
Defenceman	(Croatia) Diana Stolar
Forward	(Lithuania) Klara Miuller

== Group B tournament ==
2025 IIHF Women's World Championship Division III B

Tournament details
- Host country: Bosnia and Herzegovina
- Venue: 1 (in 1 host city)
- Dates: 13–18 February
- Teams: 5

Tournament statistics
- Games played: 10
- Goals scored: 67 (6.7 per game)
- Attendance: 693 (69 per game)
- Scoring leader: (Bulgaria) Maria Runevska (11 points)

Official website
- Website

=== Participants ===
Team	Qualification
Bulgaria	Placed 6th in 2024 Division III A and was relegated.
Estonia	Placed 2nd in 2024 Division III B.
Israel	Placed 3rd in 2024 Division III B.
Singapore	Placed 4th in 2024 Division III B.
Bosnia and Herzegovina	Host, Placed 5th in 2024 Division III B.

=== Match officials ===
Three referees and five linesmen were selected for the tournament.

Referees	Linesmen
(Canada) Audrey-Anne Girard; (Slovakia) Zuzana Rimbalová; (South Korea) Choi Bo-young	(France) Gaëlle Bourdon; (France) Sueva Torribio-Rousselin; (Hungary) Lili Sánta; (Sweden) Tova Andersson; (United Arab Emirates) Fatima Al-Ali

=== Standings ===
Pos	Team	Pld	W	OTW	OTL	L	GF	GA	GD	Pts	Promotion
1	Bulgaria	4	3	0	1	0	19	9	+10	10	Promoted to the 2026 Division III A
2	Israel	4	2	1	0	1	17	10	+7	8	
3	Estonia	4	2	0	1	1	11	11	0	7	
4	Bosnia and Herzegovina (H)	4	1	1	0	2	16	14	+2	5	
5	Singapore	4	0	0	0	4	4	23	−19	0	

Source: IIHF
Rules for classification: 1) points; 2) head-to-head points; 3) head-to-head goal difference; 4) head-to-head number of goals scored; 5) result against closest best-ranked team outside tied teams; 6) result against second-best ranked team outside tied teams; 7) seeding before tournament.
(H) Host

=== Results ===
All times are local (UTC+1).

13 February 2025; 15:00	Bulgaria	5–2 (1–0, 2–1, 2–1)	Israel	Mirza Delibašić Hall, Sarajevo; Attendance: 23

Game reference

Monika Nedyalkova
Goalies
Yael Fatiev
Referee:
(South Korea) Choi Bo-young
Linesmen:
(United Arab Emirates) Fatima Al-Ali
(Sweden) Tova Andersson

Stoyanova (Runevska) (PP) – 05:36	1–0
Stoyanova – 27:20	2–0
Ivanova (Dikova) – 29:08	3–0
	3–1	38:11 – Basov (Kotler)
Dimova (M. Georgieva, Stoyanova) – 42:51	4–1
Kozarova (Runevska) – 53:43	5–1
	5–2	57:40 – Leshem

6 min
Penalties
12 min
61
Shots
22

13 February 2025; 19:00	Bosnia and Herzegovina	2–4 (1–1, 1–2, 0–1)	Estonia	Mirza Delibašić Hall, Sarajevo; Attendance: 113

Game reference

Amra Zubčević
Goalies
Sofia Salamatina
Referee:
(Canada) Audrey-Anne Girard
Linesmen:
(France) Gaëlle Bourdon
(Hungary) Lili Sánta

	0–1	03:08 – Griffin
Lincender – 19:54	1–1
L. Zubčević (Šoše) – 20:58	2–1
	2–2	39:09 – Prants (Kaareste) (PP)
	2–3	39:35 – Jõemets (Hollo)
	2–4	59:46 – Prants (EN)

4 min
Penalties
8 min
36
Shots
23

14 February 2025; 19:00	Singapore	1–9 (0–4, 0–1, 1–4)	Bosnia and Herzegovina	Mirza Delibašić Hall, Sarajevo; Attendance: 149

Game reference

Qina Foo
Goalies
Amra Zubčević
Referee:
(Slovakia) Zuzana Rimbalová
Linesmen:
(Sweden) Tova Andersson
(France) Sueva Torribio-Rousselin

	0–1	01:11 – Kapić (L. Zubčević)
	0–2	12:36 – Šopović (Kapić) (PP)
	0–3	14:30 – Muharemović (Nikolić, Posavec)
	0–4	16:15 – L. Zubčević (Kapić)
	0–5	30:24 – Krupalija (H. Mulazimović, Karamehmedović)
	0–6	47:23 – Kapić (PP)
Yap (Mak) – 51:20	1–6
	1–7	55:26 – Lincender (Kapić) (PP)
	1–8	58:28 – L. Zubčević (Lincender, Nikolić)
	1–9	59:21 – L. Zubčević (Hodžić)

8 min
Penalties
8 min
15
Shots
43

15 February 2025; 15:00	Estonia	2–3 OT (1–1, 1–1, 0–0) (OT: 0–1)	Israel	Mirza Delibašić Hall, Sarajevo; Attendance: 14

Game reference

Uljana Jeggi
Goalies
Yael Fatiev
Referee:
(Slovakia) Zuzana Rimbalová
Linesmen:
(Hungary) Lili Sánta
(France) Sueva Torribio-Rousselin

	0–1	00:58 – Leshem
Griffin (Jõemets, Prants) – 09:24	1–1
Prants – 21:16	2–1
	2–2	39:29 – Basov
	2–3	64:19 – Leshem (Kotler)

6 min
Penalties
6 min
56
Shots
29

15 February 2025; 19:00	Singapore	0–6 (0–2, 0–1, 0–3)	Bulgaria	Mirza Delibašić Hall, Sarajevo; Attendance: 29

Game reference

Qina Foo
Goalies
Angelina Dimova
Referee:
(South Korea) Choi Bo-young
Linesmen:
(United Arab Emirates) Fatima Al-Ali
(France) Gaëlle Bourdon

0–1	01:03 – Runevska (SH)
0–2	04:37 – M. Georgieva (Ivanova, Stoyanova) (PP)
0–3	30:19 – Runevska (Baykusheva)
0–4	53:17 – Runevska (Petrova)
0–5	56:25 – Stoyanova (Ivanova)
0–6	59:55 – Ivanova (Zlateva, Dikova)

8 min
Penalties
12 min
11
Shots
39

16 February 2025; 19:00	Bosnia and Herzegovina	4–3 OT (1–3, 1–0, 1–0) (OT: 1–0)	Bulgaria	Mirza Delibašić Hall, Sarajevo; Attendance: 176

Game reference

Amra Zubčević
Goalies
Angelina Dimova
Referee:
(Canada) Audrey-Anne Girard
Linesmen:
(Sweden) Tova Andersson
(France) Sueva Torribio-Rousselin

	0–1	02:05 – Petrova (Runevska)
	0–2	02:40 – K. Dimova (Petrova)
L. Zubčević (Kapić, Lincender) (PP) – 10:29	1–2
	1–3	17:09 – Ivanova (Runevska)
Mulazimović (Krupalija) – 31:51	2–3
L. Zubčević (Lincender) – 55:04	3–3
L. Zubčević (Lincender) – 63:21	4–3

8 min
Penalties
8 min
22
Shots
24

17 February 2025; 15:00	Estonia	2–1 (1–0, 0–1, 1–0)	Singapore	Mirza Delibašić Hall, Sarajevo; Attendance: 7

Game reference

Uljana Jeggi
Goalies
Qina Foo
Referee:
(Canada) Audrey-Anne Girard
Linesmen:
(Sweden) Tova Andersson
(Hungary) Lili Sánta

Seppar (Zrelov) – 08:13	1–0
	1–1	35:40 – Chua (Ong)
Valiste (Bilorus) – 50:55	2–1

4 min
Penalties
8 min
36
Shots
12

17 February 2025; 19:00	Israel	6–1 (1–1, 1–0, 4–0)	Bosnia and Herzegovina	Mirza Delibašić Hall, Sarajevo; Attendance: 132

Game reference

Yael Fatiev
Goalies
Amra Zubčević
Hana Sadović
Referee:
(Slovakia) Zuzana Rimbalová
Linesmen:
(France) Gaëlle Bourdon
(France) Sueva Torribio-Rousselin

Angress (Kotler) – 01:17	1–0
	1–1	14:47 – L. Zubčević (Lincender) (PP)
Zioni – 38:36	2–1
Kotler (Basov, Leshem) – 46:08	3–1
Leshem (PP) – 49:45	4–1
Mirotchnik (Leshem, Basov) (PP) – 57:15	5–1
Basov (Kotler) – 58:47	6–1

14 min
Penalties
10 min
21
Shots
38

18 February 2025; 15:00	Bulgaria	5–3 (1–1, 1–2, 3–0)	Estonia	Mirza Delibašić Hall, Sarajevo; Attendance: 35

Game reference

Monika Nedyalkova
Goalies
Sofia Salamatina
Referee:
(Canada) Audrey-Anne Girard
Linesmen:
(Sweden) Tova Andersson
(Hungary) Lili Sánta

	0–1	05:18 – Kulla (Kaareste) (PP)
Runevska (Stoyanova) – 11:49	1–1
	1–2	25:47 – Kulla (Vont)
	1–3	30:07 – Prants (Griffin)
Stoyanova (Runevska) – 36:51	2–3
M. Georgieva (Runevska, Ivanova) (PP) – 43:13	3–3
Runevska – 47:31	4–3
Ivanova (ENG) – 59:39	5–3

6 min
Penalties
2 min
46
Shots
22

18 February 2025; 19:00	Israel	6–2 (3–1, 1–0, 2–1)	Singapore	Mirza Delibašić Hall, Sarajevo; Attendance: 15

Game reference

Yael Fatiev
Bisan Maree
Goalies
Qina Foo
Referee:
(South Korea) Choi Bo-young
Linesmen:
(United Arab Emirates) Fatima Al-Ali
(France) Gaëlle Bourdon

Kotler (Leshem, Basov) – 02:02	1–0
	1–1	05:21 – Goh (Ong)
Zioni (Adivi, Orgil) – 07:36	2–1
Basov – 15:58	3–1
Elia (Leshem) (PP) – 21:44	4–1
	4–2	52:22 – Oliveiro
Zioni (Leshem) – 54:04	5–2
Leshem (Basov) – 56:56	6–2

2 min
Penalties
8 min
35
Shots
20

=== Statistics ===
==== Scoring leaders ====
List shows the top skaters sorted by points, then goals.

Player	GP	G	A	Pts	+/−	PIM	POS
(Bulgaria) Maria Runevska	4	5	6	11	+8	2	F
(Israel) Lior Leshem	4	6	4	10	+6	2	D
(Israel) Pnina Basov	4	3	7	10	+6	8	F
(Bosnia and Herzegovina) Lamija Zubčević	4	8	1	9	+4	0	F
(Bulgaria) Lena Ivanova	4	4	3	7	+8	0	F
(Bulgaria) Stefani Stoyanova	4	4	3	7	+8	2	F
(Bosnia and Herzegovina) Ava Lincender	4	2	5	7	+5	4	F
(Israel) Shani Kotler	4	3	3	6	+6	0	F
(Bosnia and Herzegovina) Irma Kapić	4	2	4	6	0	6	F
(Estonia) Olesja Prants	4	4	1	5	+4	0	F

GP = Games played; G = Goals; A = Assists; Pts = Points; +/− = Plus/Minus; PIM = Penalties in Minutes; POS = Position
Source: IIHF.com

==== Goaltending leaders ====
Only the top five goaltenders, based on save percentage, who have played at least 40% of their team's minutes, are included in this list.

Player	TOI	GA	GAA	SA	Sv%	SO
(Israel) Yael Fatiev	234:37	9	2.30	172	94.77	0
(Estonia) Sofia Salamatina	178:57	7	2.35	93	92.47	0
(Bulgaria) Monika Nedyalkova	120:00	5	2.50	44	88.64	0
(Bulgaria) Angelina Dimova	123:21	4	1.95	33	87.88	1
(Bosnia and Herzegovina) Amra Zubčević	229:50	10	2.61	78	87.18	0

TOI = time on ice (minutes:seconds); SA = shots against; GA = goals against; GAA = goals against average; Sv% = save percentage; SO = shutouts
Source: IIHF.com

=== Awards ===
Position	Player
Goaltender	(Israel) Yael Fatiev
Defenceman	(Estonia) Aleksandra-Olga Seppar
Forward	(Bulgaria) Maria Runevska
