= 2022 IIHF Women's World Championship Division III =

International ice hockey tournament

Tournament details
- Host countries: Bulgaria; Serbia
- Venues: 2 (in 2 host cities)
- Dates: 4–9 April; 22–25 March
- Teams: 7

The 2022 IIHF Women's World Championship Division III consisted of two international ice hockey tournaments of the 2022 Women's Ice Hockey World Championships organized by the International Ice Hockey Federation (IIHF). Division III A and Division III B represent the sixth and seventh tier of the IIHF World Women's Championship.

Belgium won Group A and were promoted to Division II, while Estonia won the Group B tournament and were promoted to Group A. Due to Russia's exclusion, no team was relegated this season.

== Group A tournament ==
2022 IIHF Women's World Championship Division III A

Tournament details
- Host country: Bulgaria
- City: Sofia
- Venue: 1 (in 1 host city)
- Dates: 4–9 April
- Teams: 3

Tournament statistics
- Games played: 6
- Goals scored: 45 (7.5 per game)
- Attendance: 1,782 (297 per game)
- Scoring leader: (Belgium) Lotte De Guchtenaere (13 points)

Official website
- www.iihf.com

The Division III Group A tournament was played in Sofia, Bulgaria, from 4 to 9 April 2022.

=== Participating teams ===
Team	Qualification
~~Ukraine~~	Placed 6th in 2020 Division II B and were relegated.
Belgium	Placed 2nd in 2020 Division III.
~~Romania~~	Placed 3rd in 2020 Division III.
Bulgaria	Hosts; placed 4th in 2020 Division III.
Lithuania	Placed 5th in 2020 Division III.
~~Hong Kong~~	Placed 6th in 2020 Division III.

=== Match officials ===
Two referees and three linesmen were selected for the tournament.

Referees	Linesmen
(Switzerland) Drahomira Fialova; (Turkey) Sinem Türkmen	(Austria) Harriet Weegh; (Germany) Julia Strube; (Sweden) Julia Hjelmström

=== Final standings ===
Pos	Team	Pld	W	OTW	OTL	L	GF	GA	GD	Pts	Promotion or relegation
1	Belgium	4	3	0	0	1	26	3	+23	9 (Note: Belgium and Lithuania are tied on head-to-head points (3–3); head-to-head goal difference: Belgium +7, Lithuania –7.)	Promoted to the 2023 Division II B
2	Lithuania	4	3	0	0	1	14	15	−1	9	
3	Bulgaria (H)	4	0	0	0	4	5	27	−22	0	
–	Romania (Note: Romania withdrew their team on 25 March 2022 because of the COVID-19 pandemic.)	0	0	0	0	0	0	0	0	0	Withdrawn
–	Ukraine (Note: Ukraine withdrew due to the 2022 Russian invasion of Ukraine.)	0	0	0	0	0	0	0	0	0	Withdrawn
–	Hong Kong (Note: Hong Kong withdrew their team on 3 March 2022 because of the COVID-19 pandemic.)	0	0	0	0	0	0	0	0	0	Withdrawn

Source: IIHF
Rules for classification: 1) points; 2) head-to-head points; 3) head-to-head goal difference; 4) head-to-head number of goals scored; 5) result against closest best-ranked team outside tied teams; 6) result against second-best ranked team outside tied teams; 7) seeding before tournament.
(H) Host

=== Match results ===
All times are local (Eastern European Summer Time – UTC+3)

4 April 2022; 18:30	Belgium	2–3 (0–2, 1–0, 1–1)	Lithuania	Winter Sports Palace, Sofia; Attendance: 201

Game reference

Nina Van Orshaegen
Goalies
Emilie Simonsen
Referee:
(Turkey) Sinem Türkmen
Linesmen:
(Germany) Julia Strube
(Austria) Harriet Weegh

	0–1	05:13 – Petrauskaitė (Miuller)
	0–2	19:14 – Miuller
Bosmans – 34:11	1–2
Steeno (PP) – 54:53	2–2
	2–3	56:43 – Miuller (PP2)

20 min
Penalties
16 min
45
Shots
15

5 April 2022; 18:30	Lithuania	8–3 (3–1, 3–1, 2–1)	Bulgaria	Winter Sports Palace, Sofia; Attendance: 600

Game reference

Emilie Simonsen
Goalies
Paulina Georgieva
Katrin Stankova
Referee:
(Switzerland) Drahomira Fialova
Linesmen:
(Sweden) Julia Hjelmström
(Germany) Julia Strube

Miuller – 04:24	1–0
	1–1	12:46 – Dilova (Baykusheva, Ovcharova)
Miuller (Maleckienė) (PP) – 15:07	2–1
Miuller (Maleckienė, Bazevičiūtė) (PP) – 17:43	3–1
	3–2	31:49 – Zareva (Popova, Runevska) (PP)
Miuller (Petrauskaitė) – 36:49	4–2
Miuller (Karpavičiūtė) – 39:52	5–2
Maleckienė (Miuller) – 39:59	6–2
Miuller (Simonsen) – 42:38	7–2
	7–3	48:21 – Zareva (Lisichkova)
Tučiūtė – 50:30	8–3

4 min
Penalties
6 min
21
Shots
29

6 April 2022; 18:30	Belgium	8–0 (3–0, 1–0, 4–0)	Bulgaria	Winter Sports Palace, Sofia; Attendance: 350

Game reference

Nina Van Orshaegen
Charlotte Swinnen
Goalies
Katrin Stankova
Referee:
(Turkey) Sinem Türkmen
Linesmen:
(Sweden) Julia Hjelmström
(Austria) Harriet Weegh

De Wolf (Paulissen) – 04:31	1–0
Boon (De Wolf, De Terwangne) – 05:22	2–0
Steeno (Van Calster) – 14:23	3–0
De Guchtenaere (Bosmans, Van Calster) – 25:50	4–0
Bosmans (De Guchtenaere, Steeno) – 43:32	5–0
De Terwangne (Meulebrouck) – 47:32	6–0
De Guchtenaere – 50:52	7–0
De Guchtenaere (Bosmans) (PP) – 59:47	8–0

6 min
Penalties
8 min
27
Shots
16

7 April 2022; 18:30	Lithuania	0–8 (0–0, 0–1, 0–7)	Belgium	Winter Sports Palace, Sofia; Attendance: 120

Game reference

Emilie Simonsen
Viltė Beličenkaitė
Goalies
Nina Van Orshaegen
Referee:
(Switzerland) Drahomira Fialova
Linesmen:
(Sweden) Julia Hjelmström
(Germany) Julia Strube

0–1	29:50 – Paulissen (De Wolf)
0–2	43:25 – De Guchtenaere (Steeno, Bosmans)
0–3	44:30 – De Guchtenaere (Bosmans, Van Calster)
0–4	46:47 – Bosmans (Steeno, Boon)
0–5	47:28 – Bosmans (De Guchtenaere, Steeno)
0–6	49:27 – De Guchtenaere (Bosmans, Horemans) (PP)
0–7	50:16 – Steeno
0–8	57:37 – De Wolf (Horemans

4 min
Penalties
4 min
6
Shots
53

8 April 2022; 18:30	Bulgaria	2–3 (0–3, 2–0, 0–0)	Lithuania	Winter Sports Palace, Sofia; Attendance: 210

Game reference

Katrin Stankova
Goalies
Emilie Simonsen
Referee:
(Turkey) Sinem Türkmen
Linesmen:
(Germany) Julia Strube
(Austria) Harriet Weegh

	0–1	06:58 – Maleckienė (Tučiūtė)
	0–2	08:50 – Miuller (PP)
	0–3	11:57 – Tučiūtė (Miuller) (Petrauskaitė)
Runevska (Dimova) (Kotseva) – 26:27	1–3
Zareva (Popova) – 35:40	2–3

10 min
Penalties
12 min
37
Shots
23

9 April 2022; 19:00	Bulgaria	0–8 (0–4, 0–1, 0–3)	Belgium	Winter Sports Palace, Sofia; Attendance: 301

Game reference

Katrin Stankova
Goalies
Nina Van Orshaegen
Charlotte Swinnen
Referee:
(Switzerland) Drahomira Fialova
Linesmen:
(Sweden) Julia Hjelmström
(Austria) Harriet Weegh

0–1	11:52 – Steeno (Bosmans, De Guchtenaere)
0–2	13:10 – Bosmans
0–3	13:38 – Azitemina (De Terwangne, Meulebrouck)
0–4	14:03 – Bosmans (De Guchtenaere, Steeno)
0–5	33:32 – De Guchtenaere (De Wolf) (SH)
0–6	43:23 – Azitemina (De Guchtenaere)
0–7	51:33 – Steeno (Bosmans, De Guchtenaere)
0–8	55:09 – Steeno (Bosmans, Bollen)

2 min
Penalties
8 min
15
Shots
30

=== Statistics ===
==== Scoring leaders ====
List shows the top skaters sorted by points, then goals.

Player	GP	G	A	Pts	+/−	PIM	POS
(Belgium) Lotte De Guchtenaere	4	7	6	13	+15	2	F
(Belgium) Femke Bosmans	4	5	8	13	+12	6	F
(Lithuania) Klara Miuller	4	9	3	12	+5	2	F
(Belgium) Anke Steeno	4	6	5	11	+12	2	F
(Belgium) Renee De Wolf	4	2	3	5	+7	8	F
(Lithuania) Ramune Maleckienė	4	2	2	4	+5	4	F
(Bulgaria) Mirela Zareva	4	3	0	4	−10	0	F
(Belgium) Louise Paulissen	4	2	1	3	+5	0	F
(Lithuania) Emilija Tučiūtė	4	2	1	3	+5	2	D
(Belgium) Audrey De Terwangne	4	1	2	3	+3	0	F

GP = Games played; G = Goals; A = Assists; Pts = Points; +/− = Plus/Minus; PIM = Penalties in Minutes; POS = Position
Source: IIHF.com

==== Goaltending leaders ====
Only the top five goaltenders, based on save percentage, who have played at least 40% of their team's minutes, are included in this list.

Player	TOI	GA	GAA	SA	Sv%	SO
(Belgium) Nina Van Orshaegen	204:50	4	0.88	44	93.18	1
(Lithuania) Emilie Simonsen	225:50	12	3.19	150	92.00	0
(Bulgaria) Katrin Stankova	199:10	21	6.33	89	76.40	0

TOI = time on ice (minutes:seconds); SA = shots against; GA = goals against; GAA = goals against average; Sv% = save percentage; SO = shutouts
Source: IIHF.com

=== Awards ===
Position	Player
Goaltender	(Lithuania) Emilie Simonsen
Defenceman	(Belgium) Chinouk Van Calster
Forward	(Belgium) Lotte De Guchtenaere

== Group B tournament ==
2022 IIHF Women's World Championship Division III B

Tournament details
- Host country: Serbia
- City: Belgrade
- Venue: 1 (in 1 host city)
- Dates: 22–25 March
- Teams: 4

Tournament statistics
- Games played: 6
- Goals scored: 43 (7.17 per game)
- Attendance: 493 (82 per game)
- Scoring leader: (Estonia) Edith Pärnik (6 points)

Official website
- www.iihf.com

The Division III Group B tournament was played in Belgrade, Serbia, from 22 to 25 March 2022.

=== Participating teams ===
Team	Qualification
Estonia	Last participated in 2008.
Bosnia and Herzegovina	First time participating in World Championship.
Serbia	Hosts; first time participating in World Championship.
Israel	First time participating in World Championship.
~~Iran~~	~~First time participating in World Championship.~~

=== Final standings ===
Pos	Team	Pld	W	OTW	OTL	L	GF	GA	GD	Pts	Promotion
1	Estonia	3	3	0	0	0	24	1	+23	9	Promoted to the 2023 Division III A
2	Serbia (H)	3	2	0	0	1	11	5	+6	6	
3	Bosnia and Herzegovina	3	1	0	0	2	7	16	−9	3	
4	Israel	3	0	0	0	3	1	21	−20	0	
–	Iran (Note: Iran was scheduled to participate, but withdrew in September 2021 to avoid competing against Israel.)	0	0	0	0	0	0	0	0	0	Withdrawn

Source: IIHF
Rules for classification: 1) points; 2) head-to-head points; 3) head-to-head goal difference; 4) head-to-head number of goals scored; 5) result against closest best-ranked team outside tied teams; 6) result against second-best ranked team outside tied teams; 7) seeding before tournament.
(H) Host

=== Match results ===
All times are local (Central European Time – UTC+1)

22 March 2022; 14:00	Bosnia and Herzegovina	5–1 (3–0, 2–1, 0–0)	Israel	Pionir Ice Hall, Belgrade; Attendance: 37

Game reference

Hana Sadović
Goalies
Yael Fatiev
Shelly Zilkha
Referee:
(Finland) Sini Kauhanen
Linesmen:
(Latvia) Baiba Dzene
(France) Laura Perronin

Kapić (SH) – 04:48	1–0
Mulić (Karamehmedović) – 10:57	2–0
Kapić (Šopović) – 18:55	3–0
Mulić (Hodžić) (PP) – 23:46	4–0
	4–1	25:24 – C. Kotler (S. Kotler)
Karamehmedović (Viden, Hanić) – 39:56	5–1

8 min
Penalties
8 min
35
Shots
13

22 March 2022; 17:30	Estonia	4–0 (2–0, 1–0, 1–0)	Serbia	Pionir Ice Hall, Belgrade; Attendance: 126

Game reference

Delen Schule
Goalies
Jovana Korica
Referee:
(Switzerland) Mariko Dale
Linesmen:
(Iceland) Elva Hjálmarsdóttir
(Czech Republic) Lucie Povová

Pärnik (Kulla) – 01:44	1–0
Seppar (Griffin) – 10:57	2–0
Lauk (Kulla) – 23:40	3–0
Pärnik (Kaareste, Kulla) – 40:46	4–0

31 min
Penalties
10 min
20
Shots
15

23 March 2022; 14:00	Israel	0–10 (0–5, 0–5, 0–0)	Estonia	Pionir Ice Hall, Belgrade; Attendance: 27

Game reference

Shelly Zilkha
Yael Fatiev
Goalies
Triinu Tuvike
Referee:
(Finland) Sini Kauhanen
Linesmen:
(Norway) Maren Frohaug
(Czech Republic) Lucie Povová

0–1	03:05 – Pärnik (Kaareste)
0–2	10:45 – Benetis (Griffin)
0–3	11:04 – Pärnik
0–4	16:49 – Mahla
0–5	19:00 – Lauk (Kaareste)
0–6	25:41 – Griffin (Jõemets) (PP, EA)
0–7	27:12 – Leet (Seppar)
0–8	27:48 – Benetis (Griffin) (EA)
0–9	35:44 – Lauk (Kulla)
0–10	38:40 – Pärnik (Kaareste)

10 min
Penalties
6 min
4
Shots
69

23 March 2022; 17:30	Bosnia and Herzegovina	1–5 (0–1, 0–3, 1–1)	Serbia	Pionir Ice Hall, Belgrade; Attendance: 114

Game reference

Zejneb Paldum
Goalies
Jovana Korica
Sintija Vereš
Referee:
(Switzerland) Mariko Dale
Linesmen:
(Latvia) Baiba Dzene
(Iceland) Elva Hjálmarsdóttir

	0–1	19:22 – Benčić (Vrhoci) (PP)
	0–2	29:04 – Vrhoci (SH)
	0–3	30:51 – Vaštag (Vrhoci) (PP)
	0–4	36:09 – Milodanović (Vaštag)
Kapić (Šoše) (PP) – 46:30	1–4
	1–5	46:42 – Stantić (Popov)

10 min
Penalties
8 min
6
Shots
23

25 March 2022; 14:00	Estonia	10–1 (2–0, 3–1, 5–0)	Bosnia and Herzegovina	Pionir Ice Hall, Belgrade; Attendance: 36

Game reference

Delen Schule
Goalies
Hana Sadović
Zejneb Paldum
Referee:
(Switzerland) Mariko Dale
Linesmen:
(Latvia) Baiba Dzene
(Norway) Maren Frohaug

Kulla (Seppar) (PP) – 03:30	1–0
Aasma (Neering) – 09:26	2–0
Mahla – 23:29	3–0
	3–1	28:39 – Kapić
Mahla (Aasma) – 29:11	4–1
Joemets (Kaareste) – 30:21	5–1
Lauk (Seppar) – 40:19	6–1
Disko (Roosileht) – 42:37	7–1
Hollo (Griffin) – 44:34	8–1
Lauk (Pärnik) – 50:11	9–1
Leet – 56:40	10–1

12 min
Penalties
8 min
33
Shots
6

25 March 2022; 17:30	Serbia	6–0 (2–0, 2–0, 2–0)	Israel	Pionir Ice Hall, Belgrade; Attendance: 153

Game reference

Jovana Korica
Sintija Veres
Goalies
Yael Fatiev
Referee:
(Finland) Sini Kauhanen
Linesmen:
(France) Laura Peronnin
(Czech Republic) Lucie Povová

H. Rac Sabo (Radović) (PP) – 07:02	1–0
Popov (Stantić) – 11:16	2–0
Milodanović (Popov) – 26:49	3–0
L. Rac Sabo (Vastag) – 31:46	4–0
L. Rac Sabo (Vrhoci) – 55:58	5–0
Vastag (Vrhoci) – 58:19	6–0

12 min
Penalties
8 min
42
Shots
0

=== Statistics ===
==== Scoring leaders ====
List shows the top skaters sorted by points, then goals.

Player	GP	G	A	Pts	+/−	PIM	POS
(Estonia) Edith Pärnik	3	5	1	6	+12	0	F
(Estonia) Christin Lauk	3	5	0	5	+10	0	D
(Estonia) Merlin Griffin	3	1	4	5	+4	0	F
(Estonia) Kirke Kulla	3	1	4	5	+9	2	F
(Serbia) Valentina Vrhoci	3	1	4	5	+3	0	F
(Estonia) Diane Kaareste	3	0	5	5	+9	0	F
(Bosnia and Herzegovina) Irma Kapić	3	4	0	4	−1	4	F
(Serbia) Ivett Vastag	3	2	2	4	+2	2	F
(Estonia) Aleksandra-Olga Seppar	3	1	3	4	+5	4	D
(Estonia) Helen Mahla	3	3	0	3	+5	0	F

GP = Games played; G = Goals; A = Assists; Pts = Points; +/− = Plus/Minus; PIM = Penalties in Minutes; POS = Position
Source: IIHF.com

==== Goaltending leaders ====
Only the top five goaltenders, based on save percentage, who have played at least 40% of their team's minutes, are included in this list.

Player	TOI	GA	GAA	SA	Sv%	SO
(Estonia) Delen Schule	120:00	1	0.50	21	95.24	1
(Israel) Yael Fatiev	141:16	13	5.52	111	88.29	0
(Serbia) Jovana Korica	160:25	5	1.87	25	80.00	0
(Bosnia and Herzegovina) Hana Sadović	102:37	8	4.68	36	77.78	0
(Bosnia and Herzegovina) Zejneb Paldum	77:23	8	6.20	33	75.76	0

TOI = time on ice (minutes:seconds); SA = shots against; GA = goals against; GAA = goals against average; Sv% = save percentage; SO = shutouts
Source: IIHF.com

=== Awards ===
Position	Player
Goaltender	(Estonia) Delen Schule
Defenceman	(Estonia) Christin Lauk
Forward	(Serbia) Valentina Vrhoci
