= 2020 IIHF Women's World Championship Division III =

Tournament details
- Host country: Bulgaria
- City: Sofia
- Venue: 1 (in 1 host city)
- Dates: 4–10 December 2019
- Teams: 6

Tournament statistics
- Games played: 15
- Goals scored: 91 (6.07 per game)
- Attendance: 3,304 (220 per game)
- Scoring leader: (Lithuania) Klara Miuller (10 points)

Official website
- www.iihf.com

The 2020 IIHF Women's World Championship Division III was an international ice hockey tournament organized by the International Ice Hockey Federation.

The tournament was played in Sofia, Bulgaria, from 4 to 10 December 2019.

South Africa won the tournament and were promoted to Division II B.

== Participating teams ==
Team	Qualification
Romania	Placed 6th in Division II B previous year and were relegated.
Belgium	Placed 2nd in Division II B Qualification previous year.
South Africa	Placed 3rd in Division II B Qualification previous year.
Hong Kong	Placed 4th in Division II B Qualification previous year.
Bulgaria	Hosts; placed 5th in Division II B Qualification previous year.
Lithuania	First time participating in World Championship.

== Match officials ==
Four referees and seven linesmen are selected for the tournament.

Referees	Linesmen
(Australia) Gabrielle Aston; (Canada) Shauna Neary; (Norway) Rita Rygh; (United States) Laura White	(Belarus) Anastasia Tanasevich; (Finland) Aino Härkönen; (United Kingdom) Lorna Beresford; (Norway) Nina Refset; (Russia) Yulia Lavelina; (Slovenia) Ines Confidenti; (Switzerland) Michelle Müller

== Final standings ==
Pos	Team	Pld	W	OTW	OTL	L	GF	GA	GD	Pts	Promotion
1	South Africa	5	4	0	0	1	16	18	−2	12	Promoted to the 2022 Division II B
2	Belgium	5	3	0	0	2	22	13	+9	9 (Note: Romania 2–4 Belgium)	
3	Romania	5	2	1	1	1	22	15	+7	9	
4	Bulgaria (H)	5	2	1	0	2	14	10	+4	8	
5	Lithuania	5	2	0	0	3	13	14	−1	6	
6	Hong Kong	5	0	0	1	4	4	21	−17	1	

Source: IIHF
Rules for classification: 1) points; 2) head-to-head points; 3) head-to-head goal difference; 4) head-to-head number of goals scored; 5) result against closest best-ranked team outside tied teams; 6) result against second-best ranked team outside tied teams; 7) seeding before tournament.
(H) Host

== Match results ==
All times are local (Eastern European Time – UTC+2).

4 December 2019; 13:00	South Africa	4–11 (1–4, 0–5, 3–2)	Romania	Winter Sports Palace, Sofia; Attendance: 233

Game reference

Shaylene Swanepoel
Rachel van der Merwe
Goalies
Andrea Kurkó
Nadina Niciu
Referee:
(United States) Laura White
Linesmen:
(Finland) Aino Härkönen
(Switzerland) Michelle Müller

	0–1	03:15 – Elekes (Dávid, Barta)
	0–2	05:31 – Voicu
Schuurman – 06:38	1–2
	1–3	14:55 – Oprea (Popescu, Barta)
	1–4	18:44 – Dávid (Popescu, Bálint) (PP)
	1–5	24:08 – Bálint (Popescu, Oprea)
	1–6	24:27 – Laczkó-Szabó (Csiszér, Voicu) (EA)
	1–7	26:20 – Elekes (Sârbu, Szopos)
	1–8	30:12 – Dávid (SH)
	1–9	38:33 – Csiszér (Voicu, Laczkó-Szabó)
	1–10	42:19 – Voicu (Laczkó-Szabó, Szopos)
Rhode (Schuurman) – 45:50	2–10
Jamieson (Van Doesburgh) – 47:41	3–10
Rhode (Schuurman, Van Doesburgh) (SH) – 54:27	4–10
	4–11	58:20 – Csiszér (Voicu, Laczkó-Szabó)

4 min
Penalties
6 min
19
Shots
27

4 December 2019; 16:30	Lithuania	4–1 (2–1, 0–0, 2–0)	Hong Kong	Winter Sports Palace, Sofia; Attendance: 280

Game reference

Emilie Simonsen
Goalies
Stephanie Fok
Referee:
(Norway) Rita Rygh
Linesmen:
(United Kingdom) Lorna Beresford
(Norway) Nina Refset

	0–1	04:06 – Ip (A. Li, So)
Miuller (Kukanova) – 08:18	1–1
Miuller (SH) – 09:58	2–1
Šeršniova – 52:13	3–1
Miuller (PP) – 58:02	4–1

10 min
Penalties
8 min
15
Shots
32

4 December 2019; 20:00	Belgium	4–2 (2–0, 1–2, 1–0)	Bulgaria	Winter Sports Palace, Sofia; Attendance: 410

Game reference

Lieselot De Wageneer
Goalies
Paulina Georgieva
Referee:
(Canada) Shauna Neary
Linesmen:
(Russia) Yulia Lavelina
(Belarus) Anastasia Tanasevich

De Guchtenaere (Vetters) – 00:45	1–0
L. Bosmans (Boon, Clincke) – 01:43	2–0
	2–1	21:54 – Dilova (Stoyanova, Lisichkova) (PP)
	2–2	26:46 – Metanova (Zareva, Monova)
De Guchtenaere (F. Bosmans, Jenaer) (PP) – 32:59	3–2
De Guchtenaere (Horemans) – 43:52	4–2

8 min
Penalties
10 min
35
Shots
13

5 December 2019; 13:00	Romania	2–1 OT (0–0, 1–1, 0–0) (OT: 1–0)	Hong Kong	Winter Sports Palace, Sofia; Attendance: 35

Game reference

Nadina Niciu
Goalies
Sumi Chau
Referee:
(Australia) Gabrielle Aston
Linesmen:
(Slovenia) Ines Confidenti
(Norway) Nina Refset

	0–1	35:22 – Ip (A. Li, Leung) (PP2)
Popescu – 39:49	1–1
Voicu (Adorján) (PP2) – 63:39	2–1

24 min
Penalties
24 min
27
Shots
14

5 December 2019; 16:30	Belgium	3–4 (2–1, 1–1, 0–2)	South Africa	Winter Sports Palace, Sofia; Attendance: 231

Game reference

Charlotte Swinnen
Goalies
Shaylene Swanepoel
Referee:
(United States) Laura White
Linesmen:
(United Kingdom) Lorna Beresford
(Belarus) Anastasia Tanasevich

	0–1	00:31 – Schuurman (Rhode, Verwey)
Maka (Fransen, Willemot) – 06:56	1–1
De Guchtenaere (Jenaer) – 11:59	2–1
	2–2	20:40 – Rhode (Van Doesburgh, Verwey)
F. Bosmans (De Guchtenaere, Leyen) – 33:14	3–2
	3–3	53:25 – Brits (Loubser, Verwey)
	3–4	56:27 – Schuurman (Rhode)

8 min
Penalties
2 min
29
Shots
18

5 December 2019; 20:00	Bulgaria	2–1 (0–0, 1–1, 1–0)	Lithuania	Winter Sports Palace, Sofia; Attendance: 310

Game reference

Paulina Georgieva
Goalies
Emilie Simonsen
Referee:
(Canada) Shauna Neary
Linesmen:
(Russia) Yulia Lavelina
(Switzerland) Michelle Müller

	0–1	28:21 – Šeršniova (Karpavičiūtė, Burneikaitė)
Lisichkova (Popova) (PP) – 31:53	1–1
Lisichkova – 56:43	2–1

4 min
Penalties
8 min
45
Shots
16

7 December 2019; 13:00	Belgium	3–4 (2–1, 0–1, 1–2)	Lithuania	Winter Sports Palace, Sofia; Attendance: 150

Game reference

Charlotte Swinnen
Goalies
Emilie Simonsen
Referee:
(Australia) Gabrielle Aston
Linesmen:
(United Kingdom) Lorna Beresford
(Russia) Yulia Lavelina

L. Bosmans (F. Bosmans, Willemot) – 01:00	1–0
Jenaer (Leirs) – 02:21	2–0
	2–1	03:37 – Miuller (Jakavičienė)
	2–2	25:33 – Miuller (Maleckienė)
	2–3	42:19 – Miuller
	2–4	44:18 – Miuller (Kukanova, Maleckienė)
De Guchtenaere – 58:59	3–4

2 min
Penalties
2 min
38
Shots
8

7 December 2019; 16:30	South Africa	2–1 (0–0, 1–0, 1–1)	Hong Kong	Winter Sports Palace, Sofia; Attendance: 220

Game reference

Shaylene Swanepoel
Goalies
Sumi Chau
Referee:
(Norway) Rita Rygh
Linesmen:
(Slovenia) Ines Confidenti
(Finland) Aino Härkönen

Van Doesburgh (Brits) – 27:02	1–0
	1–1	47:24 – A. Li (PP)
Schuurman (Van Doesburgh) – 59:29	2–1

16 min
Penalties
10 min
19
Shots
11

7 December 2019; 20:00	Romania	3–4 OT (0–1, 3–1, 0–1) (OT: 0–1)	Bulgaria	Winter Sports Palace, Sofia; Attendance: 310

Game reference

Andrea Kurkó
Goalies
Paulina Georgieva
Referee:
(United States) Laura White
Linesmen:
(Switzerland) Michelle Müller
(Norway) Nina Refset

	0–1	11:52 – Lisichkova (Stoyanova, Todorova)
Oprea (Máthé) (SH) – 28:13	1–1
Oprea (Csiszér, Popescu) – 31:13	2–1
Csiszér (Barta) – 32:28	3–1
	3–2	33:29 – Metanova (Lisichkova)
	3–3	58:30 – Kotseva (Metanova, Todorova)
	3–4	64:27 – Metanova (Dilova, Lisichkova) (PP)

26 min
Penalties
35 min
23
Shots
27

8 December 2019; 13:00	Hong Kong	1–8 (0–2, 1–6, 0–0)	Belgium	Winter Sports Palace, Sofia; Attendance: 35

Game reference

Stephanie Fok
Sumi Chau
Goalies
Charlotte Swinnen
Lieselot De Wageneer
Referee:
(Canada) Shauna Neary
Linesmen:
(Finland) Aino Härkönen
(Belarus) Anastasia Tanasevich

	0–1	01:05 – Maka (F. Bosmans)
	0–2	19:15 – F. Bosmans (Van Calster) (PP)
	0–3	21:59 – Maka (Van Calster)
Ip (Wong, Leung) – 25:10	1–3
	1–4	26:01 – De Guchtenaere (Willemot, Clincke)
	1–5	27:14 – L. Bosmans (Van Calster)
	1–6	29:19 – Van Calster (Maka, L. Bosmans) (PP2)
	1–7	30:12 – F. Bosmans (Van Calster, Leyen) (PP)
	1–8	30:38 – Van Calster (Leyen, L. Bosmans) (PP)

14 min
Penalties
12 min
4
Shots
37

8 December 2019; 16:30	Lithuania	2–4 (0–1, 1–0, 1–3)	Romania	Winter Sports Palace, Sofia; Attendance: 150

Game reference

Emilie Simonsen
Goalies
Andrea Kurkó
Referee:
(Australia) Gabrielle Aston
Linesmen:
(Slovenia) Ines Confidenti
(Russia) Yulia Lavelina

	0–1	09:17 – Antal
Miuller (Maleckienė) – 39:15	1–1
	1–2	50:39 – Csiszér (Bálint)
Šeršniova (Miuller) (SH) – 56:55	2–2
	2–3	58:39 – Oprea (Máthé, Popescu) (PP)
	2–4	59:55 – Oprea (Csiszér)

14 min
Penalties
10 min
10
Shots
34

8 December 2019; 20:00	Bulgaria	1–2 (1–0, 0–0, 0–2)	South Africa	Winter Sports Palace, Sofia; Attendance: 360

Game reference

Paulina Georgieva
Goalies
Shaylene Swanepoel
Referee:
(Norway) Rita Rygh
Linesmen:
(United Kingdom) Lorna Beresford
(Switzerland) Michelle Müller

Metanova (Popova, Stoyanova) – 14:22	1–0
	1–1	51:42 – Herringer (I. Marais)
	1–2	55:22 – Keuler (Schuurman, Rhode)

24 min
Penalties
6 min
22
Shots
20

10 December 2019; 13:00	South Africa	4–2 (1–1, 2–1, 1–0)	Lithuania	Winter Sports Palace, Sofia; Attendance: 150

Game reference

Shaylene Swanepoel
Goalies
Emilie Simonsen
Referee:
(United States) Laura White
Linesmen:
(Slovenia) Ines Confidenti
(Belarus) Anastasiya Tanasevich

Rhode – 04:48	1–0
	1–1	12:09 – Miuller
Keuler (Schuurman) – 23:55	2–1
I. Marais (Schuurman, Van Doesburgh) – 30:43	3–1
	3–2	39:32 – Burneikaitė (Šeršniova) (PP)
Rhode (Schuurman, Van Doesburgh) – 41:54	4–2

2 min
Penalties
10 min
43
Shots
9

10 December 2019; 16:30	Hong Kong	0–5 (0–1, 0–3, 0–1)	Bulgaria	Winter Sports Palace, Sofia; Attendance: 250

Game reference

Sumi Chau
Goalies
Paulina Georgieva
Referee:
(Norway) Rita Rygh
Linesmen:
(United Kingdom) Lorna Beresford
(Norway) Nina Refset

0–1	09:58 – Zareva (Dimitrova, Popova)
0–2	20:30 – Popova (Stoyanova, Zareva)
0–3	21:59 – Metanova
0–4	35:56 – Metanova
0–5	45:19 – Metanova (Lisichkova, Stoyanova) (PP)

6 min
Penalties
16 min
8
Shots
23

10 December 2019; 20:00	Romania	2–4 (1–1, 0–3, 1–0)	Belgium	Winter Sports Palace, Sofia; Attendance: 180

Game reference

Andrea Kurkó
Nadina Niciu
Goalies
Charlotte Swinnen
Referee:
(Canada) Shauna Neary
Linesmen:
(Finland) Aino Härkönen
(Russia) Yulia Lavelina

Voicu (Csiszér) – 13:37	1–0
	1–1	17:48 – F. Bosmans (Van Calster)
	1–2	24:28 – De Guchtenaere (Clincke)
	1–3	31:09 – De Guchtenaere (Leyen) (PP)
	1–4	37:12 – Maka (Leirs, F. Bosmans)
Voicu (Csiszér) – 59:11	2–4

6 min
Penalties
10 min
24
Shots
15

== Awards and statistics ==
=== Awards ===
Award	Player
Best Goalkeeper	(Lithuania) Emilie Simonsen
Best Defenceman	(South Africa) Donne van Doesburgh
Best Forward	(Lithuania) Klara Miuller

=== Scoring leaders ===
List shows the top skaters sorted by points, then goals.

Player	GP	G	A	Pts	+/−	PIM	POS
(Lithuania) Klara Miuller	5	9	1	10	+4	10	F
(South Africa) Chloe Schuurman	5	4	8	10	+7	4	F
(Belgium) Lotte De Guchtenaere	5	8	1	9	0	2	F
(Romania) Timea Csiszér	5	4	5	9	+8	4	F
(Belgium) Veronika Metanova	5	7	1	8	+2	4	F
(South Africa) Dalene Rhode	5	5	3	8	+5	8	F
(Romania) Ana Voicu	5	5	3	8	+6	20	F
(Belgium) Femke Bosmans	5	4	4	8	+4	2	F
(Bulgaria) Tina Lisichkova	5	3	4	7	0	12	D
(Belgium) Chinouk Van Calster	5	2	5	7	+6	0	D

GP = Games played; G = Goals; A = Assists; Pts = Points; +/− = Plus/minus; PIM = Penalties in minutes; POS = Position
Source: IIHF.com

=== Goaltending leaders ===
Only the top five goaltenders, based on save percentage, who have played at least 40% of their team's minutes, are included in this list.

Player	TOI	GA	GAA	SA	Sv%	SO
(Lithuania) Emilie Simonsen	300:00	14	2.80	192	92.71	0
(Bulgaria) Paulina Georgieva	303:22	10	1.98	102	90.20	1
(Hong Kong) Sumi Chau	213:27	10	2.81	82	87.80	0
(South Africa) Shaylene Swanepoel	266:20	14	3.15	87	83.91	0
(Romania) Andrea Kurkó	198:19	11	3.33	58	81.03	0

TOI = Time on Ice (minutes:seconds); SA = Shots against; GA = Goals against; GAA = Goals against average; Sv% = Save percentage; SO = Shutouts
Source: IIHF.com
