= Serbia women's national ice hockey team =

Serbia
- Association: Serbian Ice Hockey Association
- Head coach: Stefan Ilić
- Assistants: Nemanja Janković
- Captain: Valentina Vrhoci
- Most games: six players (22)
- Top scorer: Valentina Vrhoci (15)
- Most points: Valentina Vrhoci (32)
- IIHF code: SRB

Ranking
- Current IIHF: 39 ▲1 (3 June 2026)
- Highest IIHF: 42 (2023)
- Lowest IIHF: 43 (2022)

First international
- Serbia 11–0 Bosnia and Herzegovina (Sarajevo, BIH; 15 October 2021)

Biggest win
- Serbia 18–0 Bosnia and Herzegovina (Novi Sad, Serbia; 12 November 2021)

Biggest defeat
- Romania 7–0 Serbia (Zagreb, Croatia; 11 March 2024)

World Championships
- Appearances: 5 (first in 2022)
- Best result: 35th (2025)

International record (W–L–T)
- 19–10–0

The Serbia women's national ice hockey team is the women's national ice hockey team of Serbia. The team is controlled by the Serbian Ice Hockey Association, a member of the International Ice Hockey Federation.

== History ==
The team first played in an international tournament at the 2022 IIHF Women's World Championship Division III, the lowest IIHF women's hockey tier.

== World Championship record ==
- 2022 – Finished in 36th place (2nd in Division IIIB)
- 2023 – Finished in 39th place (1st in Division IIIB)
- 2024 – Finished in 38th place (4th in Division IIIA)
- 2025 – Finished in 35th place (3rd in Division IIIA)
- 2026 – Finished in 39th place (5th in Division IIIA)
- 2027 – (Division IIIA)
