= Serbian Ice Hockey Association =

Serbia
- Association name: Serbian Ice Hockey Association
- IIHF Code: SRB
- Founded: 1932
- IIHF membership: February 1, 1939
- President: Marko Milovanović
- IIHF men's ranking: 30th
- IIHF women's ranking: N/A

The Serbian Ice Hockey Association (Serbian Savez hokeja na ledu Srbije, Савез хокеја на леду Србије) is the governing body and member of the International Ice Hockey Federation (IIHF) that oversees ice hockey in Serbia. The IIHF recognizes the Yugoslavia, which joined in 1939, as the predecessor to Serbia, which officially became a member in 2007.

== National teams ==
- Serbia men's national ice hockey team
- Serbia men's national junior ice hockey team
- Serbia men's national under-18 ice hockey team
- Serbia women's national ice hockey team
