= 2024 IIHF Women's World Championship Division III =

Women's ice hockey tournaments

Tournament details
- Host countries: Croatia; Estonia
- Venues: 2 (in 2 host cities)
- Dates: 11–17 March; 24–29 March
- Teams: 11

The 2024 IIHF Women's World Championship Division III comprised two international ice hockey tournaments of the 2024 Women's Ice Hockey World Championships organised by the International Ice Hockey Federation (IIHF).

The Group A tournament was played in Zagreb, Croatia from 11 to 17 March and Group B in Kohtla-Järve, Estonia, from 24 to 29 March 2024. The IIHF has indicated that they met in February to discuss Israel's participation in the Group B tournament.

Ukraine won the Group A tournament and was promoted to Division II, while Bulgaria was relegated to Group B. In Group B, Thailand was promoted after winning the tournament.

== Group A tournament ==
2024 IIHF Women's World Championship Division III A

Tournament details
- Host country: Croatia
- City: Zagreb
- Venue: 1 (in 1 host city)
- Dates: 11–17 March
- Teams: 6

Tournament statistics
- Games played: 15
- Goals scored: 90 (6 per game)
- Attendance: 1,935 (129 per game)
- Scoring leader: (Ukraine) Valeria Manchak (18 points)

Official website
- IIHF

=== Participants ===
Team	Qualification
Croatia	Host, placed 6th in 2023 Division II B and was relegated.
Ukraine	Placed 2nd in 2023 Division III A.
Lithuania	Placed 3rd in 2023 Division III A.
Romania	Placed 4th in 2023 Division III A.
Bulgaria	Placed 5th in 2023 Division III A.
Serbia	Placed 1st in 2023 Division III B and was promoted.

=== Match officials ===
Five referees and seven linesmen were selected for the tournament.

Referees	Linesmen
(China) Bai Meichen; (Finland) Sini Kauhanen; (Norway) Rite Rygh; (Switzerland) Melissa Boverio; (Switzerland) Reica Staiger	(China) Yan Aiping; (Czech Republic) Natalie Pavlačková; (France) Gaëlle Bourdon; (Germany) Natalie Bertl; (Germany) Harriet Weegh; (Japan) Kumiko Okuda; (United States) Calley Brandon-Laux

=== Standings ===
Pos	Team	Pld	W	OTW	OTL	L	GF	GA	GD	Pts	Promotion or relegation
1	Ukraine	5	4	1	0	0	28	8	+20	14	Promoted to the 2025 Division II B
2	Romania	5	4	0	0	1	20	11	+9	12	
3	Lithuania	5	2	1	0	2	15	11	+4	8	
4	Serbia	5	2	0	1	2	12	19	−7	7	
5	Croatia (H)	5	1	0	1	3	10	16	−6	4	
6	Bulgaria	5	0	0	0	5	5	25	−20	0	Relegated to the 2025 Division III B

Source: IIHF
Rules for classification: 1) points; 2) head-to-head points; 3) head-to-head goal difference; 4) head-to-head number of goals scored; 5) result against closest best-ranked team outside tied teams; 6) result against second-best ranked team outside tied teams; 7) seeding before tournament.
(H) Host

=== Results ===
All times are local (UTC+1)

11 March 2024; 12:30	Ukraine	9–1 (3–1, 5–0, 1–0)	Bulgaria	Dvorana Velesajam, Zagreb; Attendance: 68

Game reference

Viktoria Tkachenko
Goalies
Monika Nedyalkova
Referee:
(Norway) Rita Rygh
Linesmen:
(Czech Republic) Natalie Pavláčková
(Germany) Harriet Weegh

Manchak (Telehina, Tsymyrenko) – 04:19	1–0
Telehina (Vedmedenko) – 07:26	2–0
	2–1	12:39 – Dikova
Tsymyrenko (Telehina, Manchak) – 14:58	3–1
Manchak (Telehina, Tsymyrenko) – 22:22	4–1
Rozhok (Vedmedenko, Telehina) (EA) – 26:39	5–1
Vedmedenko (Tsymyrenko) – 34:46	6–1
Izmailova (Tsenova, Les) – 35:32	7–1
Mashkina (Manchak, Tsymyrenko) (PP) – 39:08	8–1
Tsymyrenko (Manchak, Telehina) – 44:56	9–1

6 min
Penalties
20 min
48
Shots
20

11 March 2024; 16:00	Serbia	0–7 (0–3, 0–2, 0–2)	Romania	Dvorana Velesajam, Zagreb; Attendance: 83

Game reference

Ana Ilić
Goalies
Andrea Kurkó
Referee:
(Finland) Sini Kauhanen
Linesmen:
(Germany) Natalie Bertl
(France) Gaëlle Bourdon

0–1	08:44 – Bende
0–2	08:55 – Szekeres (Bende)
0–3	17:23 – Oprea (David, Sarbu)
0–4	26:52 – Vitos
0–5	33:44 – Szekeres (Bende)
0–6	53:51 – Oprea
0–7	54:20 – Szekeres (Vitos)

6 min
Penalties
10 min
29
Shots
46

11 March 2024; 19:30	Lithuania	2–1 GWS (0–0, 1–1, 0–0) (OT: 0–0) (SO: 1–0)	Croatia	Dvorana Velesajam, Zagreb; Attendance: 310

Game reference
Viltė Beličenkaitė	Goalies	Julija Baždar	Referee: (Switzerland) Reica Staiger; Linesmen: (United States) Calley Brandon-Laux (Japan) Kumiko Okuda
/ 0–1 / 33:35 – Bauman; Tučiūtė (Miuller, Rastenytė) (PP) – 39:54 / 1–1			Referee: (Switzerland) Reica Staiger; Linesmen: (United States) Calley Brandon-Laux (Japan) Kumiko Okuda
Rastenytė; Tučiūtė (miss); Miuller (miss); Griniūtė (miss); Kukanova (miss)	Shootout	(miss) Čavka; (miss) Bauman; (miss) Matak; (miss) Stiperski; (miss) Stolar	Referee: (Switzerland) Reica Staiger; Linesmen: (United States) Calley Brandon-Laux (Japan) Kumiko Okuda
8 min	Penalties	4 min	Referee: (Switzerland) Reica Staiger; Linesmen: (United States) Calley Brandon-Laux (Japan) Kumiko Okuda
31	Shots	44	Referee: (Switzerland) Reica Staiger; Linesmen: (United States) Calley Brandon-Laux (Japan) Kumiko Okuda

12 March 2024; 12:30	Bulgaria	1–3 (0–2, 1–1, 0–0)	Serbia	Dvorana Velesajam, Zagreb; Attendance: 25

Game reference

Angelina Dimova
Goalies
Ana Ilić
Referee:
(China) Bai Meichen
Linesmen:
(France) Gaëlle Bourdon
(Japan) Kumiko Okuda

	0–1	12:48 – Benčić (Vukelić)
	0–2	13:56 – Velček (Ivanov, Vrhoci)
	0–3	25:20 – J. Radović
Dikova – 38:00	1–3

10 min
Penalties
10 min
28
Shots
44

12 March 2024; 16:00	Ukraine	3–1 (0–0, 1–0, 2–1)	Lithuania	Dvorana Velesajam, Zagreb; Attendance: 27

Game reference

Viktoria Tkachenko
Goalies
Viltė Beličenkaitė
Referee:
(Finland) Sini Kauhanen
Linesmen:
(Germany) Natalie Bertl
(China) Yan Aiping

Telehina (Manchak) (SH) – 21:46	1–0
Manchak (Tsymyrenko, Telehina) – 40:50	2–0
Lopatina (Izmailova) – 55:50	3–0
	3–1	59:00 – Maleckienė (Rastenytė)

8 min
Penalties
2 min
43
Shots
11

12 March 2024; 19:30	Croatia	2–4 (1–2, 0–1, 1–1)	Romania	Dvorana Velesajam, Zagreb; Attendance: 280

Game reference

Julija Baždar
Goalies
Nadina Niciu
Referee:
(Norway) Rite Rygh
Linesmen:
(United States) Calley Brandon-Laux
(Germany) Harriet Weegh

	0–1	09:11 – Szekeres
Matak (SH) – 15:04	1–1
	1–2	15:42 – Oprea (Csiszér, David)
	1–3	37:29 – Bende (Szekeres, Adam) (SH)
Vukelić (Stolar, Stiperski) – 41:01	2–3
	2–4	47:19 – Szekeres (Mihai, Bende)

12 min
Penalties
12 min
26
Shots
32

14 March 2024; 12:30	Lithuania	3–4 (1–1, 1–0, 1–3)	Romania	Dvorana Velesajam, Zagreb; Attendance: 15

Game reference

Viltė Beličenkaitė
Goalies
Nadina Niciu
Referee:
(China) Bai Meichen
Linesmen:
(Germany) Natalie Bertl
(Germany) Harriet Weegh

Jasinevičiūtė (Miuller) – 00:39	1–0
	1–1	06:15 – Bende (Szekeres)
Miuller (Jasinevičiūtė) – 21:36	2–1
Miuller (Jasinevičiūtė, Maleckienė) – 52:13	3–1
	3–2	52:33 – Bende (Adam)
	3–3	52:53 – Bende (Adam)
	3–4	54:27 – Szekeres (Bende)

2 min
Penalties
4 min
25
Shots
36

14 March 2024; 16:00	Ukraine	5–4 OT (0–2, 1–1, 3–1) (OT: 1–0)	Serbia	Dvorana Velesajam, Zagreb; Attendance: 65

Game reference

Viktoria Tkachenko
Yuliana Vilhan
Goalies
Ana Ilić
Referee:
(Switzerland) Reica Staiger
Linesmen:
(France) Gaëlle Bourdon
(China) Yan Aiping

	0–1	00:11 – Vasiljević (Velček)
	0–2	18:13 – Vukelić (Ivanov)
	0–3	22:03 – Velček (SH)
Manchak – 24:41	1–3
	1–4	46:10 – Vrhoci (T. Radović, Velček) (PP)
Manchak (Telehina) (PP) – 56:01	2–4
Manchak (Telehina) – 57:11	3–4
Tsymyrenko (Manchak, Rozhok) (EA) – 59:07	4–4
Manchak (Rozhok) – 62:01	5–4

4 min
Penalties
10 min
55
Shots
17

14 March 2024; 19:30	Croatia	5–1 (0–0, 2–0, 3–1)	Bulgaria	Dvorana Velesajam, Zagreb; Attendance: 193

Game reference

Julija Baždar
Klara Kolar
Goalies
Monika Nedyalkova
Referee:
(Finland) Sini Kauhanen
Linesmen:
(United States) Calley Brandon-Laux
(Czech Republic) Natalie Pavlačková

Matak (Čavka) – 32:43	1–0
Marinković (Vukelić) – 35:38	2–0
Bauman (Čavka) (PP) – 43:01	3–0
Vukelić (Marinković) – 46:15	4–0
Vlašić (Vukelić) – 56:40	5–0
	5–1	57:53 – Asparuhova (Runevska) (PP)

8 min
Penalties
13 min
46
Shots
29

15 March 2024; 12:30	Romania	1–5 (0–2, 0–1, 1–2)	Ukraine	Dvorana Velesajam, Zagreb; Attendance: 53

Game reference

Andrea Kurkó
Goalies
Viktoria Tkachenko
Referee:
(Switzerland) Reica Staiger
Linesmen:
(Germany) Natalie Bertl
(United States) Calley Brandon-Laux

	0–1	13:24 – Tsymyrenko (Manchak) (PP2)
	0–2	18:12 – Tsymyrenko (Manchak)
	0–3	28:41 – Telehina (Manchak)
	0–4	40:29 – Telehina (Tsymyrenko, Manchak)
Csiszér – 45:32	1–4
	1–5	57:48 – Tsymyrenko (Manchak)

10 min
Penalties
2 min
18
Shots
35

15 March 2024; 16:00	Bulgaria	1–4 (1–2, 0–2, 0–0)	Lithuania	Dvorana Velesajam, Zagreb; Attendance: 63

Game reference

Angelina Dimova
Goalies
Viltė Beličenkaitė
Referee:
(Norway) Rite Rygh
Linesmen:
(Czech Republic) Natalie Pavlačková
(China) Yan Aiping

	0–1	03:30 – Maleckienė (Jasinevičiūtė)
Asparuhova (Runevska, Dimova) – 04:03	1–1
	1–2	07:46 – Jasinevičiūtė
	1–3	25:00 – Jasinevičiūtė (Miuller, Tučiūtė)
	1–4	27:30 – Rastenytė (Jasinevičiūtė, Tučiūtė)

6 min
Penalties
6 min
15
Shots
37

15 March 2024; 19:30	Serbia	3–1 (0–0, 1–1, 2–0)	Croatia	Dvorana Velesajam, Zagreb

Game reference

Ana Ilić (ice hockey)
Goalies
Julija Baždar
Referee:
(Finland) Sini Kauhanen
Linesmen:
(Japan) Kumiko Okuda
(Germany) Harriet Weegh

	0–1	26:24 – Bauman (Stiperski)
Vukelić (Vrhoci, Velček) – 31:57	1–1
Velček (Vrhoci) (SH) – 42:28	2–1
Velček (Vrhoci) (EN) – 59:34	3–1

8 min
Penalties
4 min
34
Shots
22

17 March 2024; 12:30	Lithuania	5–2 (1–1, 1–1, 3–0)	Serbia	Dvorana Velesajam, Zagreb; Attendance: 51

Game reference

Viltė Beličenkaitė
Goalies
Ana Ilić
Referee:
(Norway) Rite Rygh
Linesmen:
(France) Gaëlle Bourdon
(China) Yan Aiping

Jasinevičiūtė (Miuller, Tučiūtė) (PP) – 07:32	1–0
	1–1	13:29 – Vrhoci (Vasiljević)
	1–2	22:36 – Popov (Benčić, Vukelić)
Miuller (Kukanova) (SH) – 25:14	2–2
Jasinevičiūtė (Miuller) – 54:20	3–2
Miuller (Griniūtė, Jasinevičiūtė) – 59:25	4–2
Miuller – 59:44	5–2

6 min
Penalties
8 min
32
Shots
24

17 March 2024; 16:00	Romania	4–1 (3–0, 1–0, 0–1)	Bulgaria	Dvorana Velesajam, Zagreb; Attendance: 62

Game reference

Nadina Niciu
Andrea Kurkó
Goalies
Monika Nedyalkova
Angelina Dimova
Referee:
(Switzerland) Reica Staiger
Linesmen:
(Germany) Natalie Bertl
(United States) Calley Brandon-Laux

Máthé (Bende) – 07:22	1–0
Mihai – 18:20	2–0
Szekeres (Sarbu) – 18:34	3–0
Szekeres – 39:52	4–0
	4–1	42:29 – Runevska

6 min
Penalties
2 min
42
Shots
31

17 March 2024; 19:30	Croatia	1–6 (1–0. 0–4, 0–2)	Ukraine	Dvorana Velesajam, Zagreb; Attendance: 320

Game reference

Klara Kolar
Goalies
Viktoria Tkachenko
Referee:
(China) Bai Meichen
Linesmen:
(Japan) Kumiko Okuda
(Czech Republic) Natalie Pavlačková

Stolar (Bauman) – 11:26	1–0
	1–1	21:13 – Mashkina
	1–2	25:27 – Telehina (Rozhok, Tsymyrenko) (PP)
	1–3	33:19 – Manchak (SH)
	1–4	38:10 – Rohanova (Elen Alipova, Eli. Alipova)
	1–5	42:27 – Tsenova (Izmailova)
	1–6	56:22 – Tsenova (Izmailova)

10 min
Penalties
8 min
16
Shots
44

=== Statistics ===
==== Scoring leaders ====
List shows the top skaters sorted by points, then goals.

Player	GP	G	A	Pts	+/−	PIM	POS
(Ukraine) Valeria Manchak	5	8	10	18	+14	4	F
(Ukraine) Daria Tsymyrenko	5	6	7	13	+12	0	F
(Ukraine) Polina Telehina	5	5	8	13	+17	0	F
(Romania) Edet Szekeres	5	8	2	10	+9	0	F
(Romania) Julia Bende	5	5	5	10	+10	10	F
(Lithuania) Viltautė Jasinevičiūtė	5	5	5	10	+8	4	F
(Lithuania) Klara Miuller	5	5	5	10	+8	0	F
(Serbia) Milica Velček	5	4	3	7	+1	4	F
(Serbia) Valentina Vrhoci	5	2	4	6	–1	0	F
(Croatia) Ana Bauman	5	3	1	4	+2	4	D

GP = Games played; G = Goals; A = Assists; Pts = Points; +/− = Plus/Minus; PIM = Penalties in Minutes; POS = Position
Source: IIHF.com

==== Goaltending leaders ====
Only the top five goaltenders, based on save percentage, who have played at least 40% of their team's minutes, are included in this list.

Player	TOI	GA	GAA	SA	Sv%	SO
(Croatia) Julija Baždar	241:00	7	1.74	119	94.12	0
(Romania) Andrea Kurkó	120:00	4	2.00	60	93.33	1
(Lithuania) Viltė Beličenkaitė	303:26	11	2.18	162	93.21	0
(Bulgaria) Angelina Dimova	148:31	8	3.23	106	92.45	0
(Ukraine) Viktoria Tkachenko	283:27	6	1.27	76	92.11	0

TOI = time on ice (minutes:seconds); SA = shots against; GA = goals against; GAA = goals against average; Sv% = save percentage; SO = shutouts
Source: IIHF.com

=== Awards ===
Position	Player
Goaltender	(Lithuania) Viltė Beličenkaitė
Defenceman	(Croatia) Diana Stolar
Forward	(Ukraine) Valeria Manchak

== Group B tournament ==
2024 IIHF Women's World Championship Division III B

Tournament details
- Host country: Estonia
- City: Kohtla-Järve
- Venue: 1 (in 1 host city)
- Dates: 24–29 March
- Teams: 5

Tournament statistics
- Games played: 10
- Goals scored: 53 (5.3 per game)
- Attendance: 3,674 (367 per game)
- Scoring leader: (Thailand) Wirasinee Rattananai (6 points)

Official website
- IIHF

=== Participants ===
Team	Qualification
Estonia	Host, placed 6th in 2023 Division III A and was relegated.
Israel	Placed 2nd in 2023 Division III B.
Bosnia and Herzegovina	Placed 3rd in 2023 Division III B.
Singapore	First time participating.
Thailand	First time participating.

=== Match officials ===
Three referees and five linesmen were selected for the tournament.

Referees	Linesmen
(Germany) Caroline Butt; (South Korea) Choi Bo-young; (Turkey) Elif Bağlar	(Estonia) Kaire Leet; (United Kingdom) Eva Harrison; (Japan) Rinka Kubota; (South Africa) Jessica Stanton; (Turkey) Ceren Alkan

=== Standings ===
Pos	Team	Pld	W	OTW	OTL	L	GF	GA	GD	Pts	Promotion
1	Thailand	4	4	0	0	0	20	1	+19	12	Promoted to the 2025 Division III A
2	Estonia (H)	4	2	1	0	1	10	4	+6	8	
3	Israel	4	2	0	0	2	7	11	−4	6	
4	Singapore	4	1	0	1	2	8	11	−3	4	
5	Bosnia and Herzegovina	4	0	0	0	4	8	26	−18	0	

Source: IIHF
Rules for classification: 1) points; 2) head-to-head points; 3) head-to-head goal difference; 4) head-to-head number of goals scored; 5) result against closest best-ranked team outside tied teams; 6) result against second-best ranked team outside tied teams; 7) seeding before tournament.
(H) Host

=== Results ===
24 March 2024; 15:00	Thailand	4–0 (3–0, 0–0, 1–0)	Israel	Kohtla-Järve Ice Hall, Kohtla-Järve; Attendance: 150

Game reference

Thamida Kunthadapakorn
Goalies
Yael Fatiev
Referee:
(South Korea) Choi Bo-young
Linesmen:
(Japan) Rinka Kubota
(Estonia) Kaire Leet

Kosanunt (Chimpradid) – 15:16	1–0
Vorawat (Chimpradid) – 16:44	2–0
Pothong (Rattananai, Jittresin) – 19:59	3–0
Kosanunt – 58:12	4–0

6 min
Penalties
8 min
69
Shots
13

24 March 2024; 18:30	Estonia	5–2 (2–0, 1–2, 2–0)	Bosnia and Herzegovina	Kohtla-Järve Ice Hall, Kohtla-Järve; Attendance: 450

Game reference

Sofia Salamatina
Goalies
Hana Sadović
Referee:
(Germany) Caroline Butt
Linesmen:
(United Kingdom) Eva Harrison
(South Africa) Jessica Stanton

Prants (Kaareste) – 00:39	1–0
Neering (Kaareste, Prants) (PP) – 10:46	2–0
Seppar (Griffin, Aasma) – 20:36	3–0
	3–1	26:20 – Karamehmedović (Mulazimović, Krupalija)
	3–2	34:38 – Karamehmedović (Krupalija, Mulazimović)
Kalde (Geller) – 50:19	4–2
Kaareste (Koger, Hollo) (PP) – 53:09	5–2

9 min
Penalties
14 min
38
Shots
30

25 March 2024; 18:30	Singapore	0–4 (0–1, 0–1, 0–2)	Thailand	Kohtla-Järve Ice Hall, Kohtla-Järve; Attendance: 135

Game reference

Qina Foo
Goalies
Wilaksaya Watthanakulcharoenchai
Referee:
(Germany) Caroline Butt
Linesmen:
(Turkey) Ceren Alkan
(Estonia) Kaire Leet

0–1	19:12 – Ponglerkdee (Boonyubol)
0–2	36:14 – Vorawat (Yannakornthanapunt, Dejthai)
0–3	46:12 – Ponglerkdee (Sakchaicharoenkul, Pothong)
0–4	53:50 – Thamma (Sakchaicharoenkul) (SH)

8 min
Penalties
10 min
8
Shots
38

26 March 2024; 15:00	Israel	4–3 (0–1, 2–2, 2–0)	Bosnia and Herzegovina	Kohtla-Järve Ice Hall, Kohtla-Järve; Attendance: 178

Game reference

Yael Fatiev
Goalies
Amra Zubčević
Referee:
(Turkey) Elif Bağlar
Linesmen:
(United Kingdom) Eva Harrison
(South Africa) Jessica Stanton

	0–1	11:14 – Karamehmedović (Krupalija, Mulazimović)
	0–2	28:26 – Šopović (Mulić) (PP)
	0–3	30:49 – Mulazimović
Leshem (Adivi, S. Kotler) – 32:20	1–3
Leshem (Basov, C. Kotler) (PP) – 36:16	2–3
Basov (Zioni, S. Kotler) (PP) – 48:46	3–3
Leshem – 52:26	4–3

10 min
Penalties
14 min
28
Shots
30

26 March 2024; 18:30	Singapore	1–2 OT (0–0, 1–0, 0–1) (OT: 0–1)	Estonia	Kohtla-Järve Ice Hall, Kohtla-Järve; Attendance: 534

Game reference

Qina Foo
Goalies
Uljana Jeggi
Referee:
(South Korea) Choi Bo-young
Linesmen:
(Turkey) Ceren Alkan
(Japan) Rinka Kubota

Ong (Lim W., Yeoh) (PP) – 30:04	1–0
	1–1	59:51 – Aasma (Seppar, Griffin) (EA)
	1–2	61:27 – Aasma (Griffin, Kalde)

10 min
Penalties
4 min
17
Shots
35

27 March 2024; 18:30	Thailand	1–0 (1–0, 0–0, 0–0)	Estonia	Kohtla-Järve Ice Hall, Kohtla-Järve; Attendance: 789

Game reference
Thamida Kunthadapakorn	Goalies	Sofia Salamatina	Referee: (Germany) Caroline Butt; Linesmen: (Turkey) Ceren Alkan (United Kingdom) Eva Harrison
Dejthai (Thanyalakpark, Rattananai) (PP) – 10:09 / 1–0			Referee: (Germany) Caroline Butt; Linesmen: (Turkey) Ceren Alkan (United Kingdom) Eva Harrison
6 min	Penalties	8 min	Referee: (Germany) Caroline Butt; Linesmen: (Turkey) Ceren Alkan (United Kingdom) Eva Harrison
34	Shots	26	Referee: (Germany) Caroline Butt; Linesmen: (Turkey) Ceren Alkan (United Kingdom) Eva Harrison

28 March 2024; 15:00	Israel	3–1 (0–0, 1–1, 2–0)	Singapore	Kohtla-Järve Ice Hall, Kohtla-Järve; Attendance: 234

Game reference

Yael Fatiev
Goalies
Qina Foo
Referee:
(Turkey) Elif Bağlar
Linesmen:
(United Kingdom) Eva Harrison
(Estonia) Kaire Leet

Leshem – 26:25	1–0
	1–1	37:30 – Yeoh (Ong, Kewk) (PP)
Basov (S. Kotler) – 46:30	2–1
Leshem (Basov, S. Kotler) (EN) – 59:34	3–1

16 min
Penalties
8 min
35
Shots
25

28 March 2024; 18:30	Bosnia and Herzegovina	1–11 (0–3, 0–5, 1–3)	Thailand	Kohtla-Järve Ice Hall, Kohtla-Järve; Attendance: 123

Game reference

Amra Zubčević
Hana Sadović
Goalies
Wilaksaya Watthanakulcharoenchai
Referee:
(Germany) Caroline Butt
Linesmen:
(Japan) Rinka Kubota
(South Africa) Jessica Stanton

	0–1	06:53 – Kosanunt (Ponglerkdee)
	0–2	13:51 – Yannakornthanapunt (Rattananai, Thamma)
	0–3	18:31 – Thamma (Rattananai, Jittresin) (PP)
	0–4	27:14 – Ponglerkdee (Kosanunt)
	0–5	31:23 – Ponglerkdee
	0–6	32:05 – Thamma
	0–7	35:31 – Vorawat
	0–8	36:54 – Yannakornthanapunt (Rattananai)
	0–9	42:24 – Kosanunt (SH)
	0–10	49:02 – Sakchaicharoenkul (Vorawat)
	0–11	51:49 – Yannakornthanapunt (Rattananai, Thamma)
Kapić – 55:50	1–11

4 min
Penalties
8 min
12
Shots
37

29 March 2024; 15:00	Estonia	3–0 (1–0, 2–0, 0–0)	Israel	Kohtla-Järve Ice Hall, Kohtla-Järve; Attendance: 956

Game reference

Uljana Jeggi
Goalies
Yael Fatiev
Referee:
(Turkey) Elif Bağlar
Linesmen:
(Turkey) Ceren Alkan
(Japan) Rinka Kubota

04:58 – Koger (Väliste)	1–0
25:16 – Griffin (Seppar)	2–0
27:09 – Prants (Kaareste)	3–0

2 min
Penalties
4 min
33
Shots
18

29 March 2024; 18:30	Bosnia and Herzegovina	2–6 (1–4, 0–1, 1–1)	Singapore	Kohtla-Järve Ice Hall, Kohtla-Järve; Attendance: 125

Game reference

Amra Zubčević
Hana Sadović
Goalies
Qina Foo
Referee:
(South Korea) Choi Bo-young
Linesmen:
(Estonia) Kaire Leet
(South Africa) Jessica Stanton

	0–1	00:32 – Ong (Aly. Goh)
	0–2	02:08 – Ale. Goh (Chia, G. Lim)
	0–3	03:44 – Chang
Šopović – 14:51	1–3
	1–4	18:34 – Yeoh (Ong, Kwek) (PP)
	1–5	37:26 – Kwek (SH)
Kapić (Šopović) – 50:32	2–5
	2–6	55:51 – Ong (PP)

6 min
Penalties
4 min
21
Shots
20

=== Statistics ===
==== Scoring leaders ====
List shows the top skaters sorted by points, then goals.

Player	GP	G	A	Pts	+/−	PIM	POS
(Thailand) Wirasinee Rattananai	4	0	6	6	+4	0	F
(Israel) Lior Leshem	4	5	0	5	+3	8	D
(Thailand) Apichaya Kosanunt	4	4	1	5	+6	4	F
(Thailand) Nuchanat Ponglerkdee	4	4	1	5	+5	2	F
(Singapore) Tiffany Ong	4	3	2	5	–5	10	F
(Thailand) Supitsara Thamma	4	3	2	5	+6	2	F
(Thailand) Thipwarintorn Yannakornthanapunt	4	3	2	5	+6	2	F
(Thailand) Pacharamon Vorawat	4	3	1	4	+5	8	F
(Israel) Pnina Basov	4	2	2	4	–1	4	F
(Estonia) Merlin Griffin	4	1	3	4	+5	0	F
(Estonia) Diana Kaareste	4	1	3	4	+1	5	F
(Bosnia and Herzegovina) Hana Mulazimović	4	1	3	4	–9	0	F

GP = Games played; G = Goals; A = Assists; Pts = Points; +/− = Plus/Minus; PIM = Penalties in Minutes; POS = Position
Source: IIHF.com

==== Goaltending leaders ====
Only the top five goaltenders, based on save percentage, who have played at least 40% of their team's minutes, are included in this list.

Player	TOI	GA	GAA	SA	Sv%	SO
(Thailand) Thamida Kunthadapakorn	120:00	0	0.00	39	100.00	2
(Estonia) Uljana Jeggi	120:22	1	0.50	35	97.14	1
(Estonia) Sofia Salamatina	120:00	3	1.50	64	95.31	0
(Thailand) Wilaksaya Watthanakulcharoenchai	120:00	1	0.50	20	95.00	1
(Israel) Yael Fatiev	240:00	11	2.75	157	92.99	0

TOI = time on ice (minutes:seconds); SA = shots against; GA = goals against; GAA = goals against average; Sv% = save percentage; SO = shutouts
Source: IIHF.com

=== Awards ===
Position	Player
Goaltender	(Estonia) Sofia Salamatina
Defenceman	(Israel) lior Leshem
Forward	(Thailand) Apichaya Kosanunt
