= Lithuania women's national ice hockey team =

Lithuania
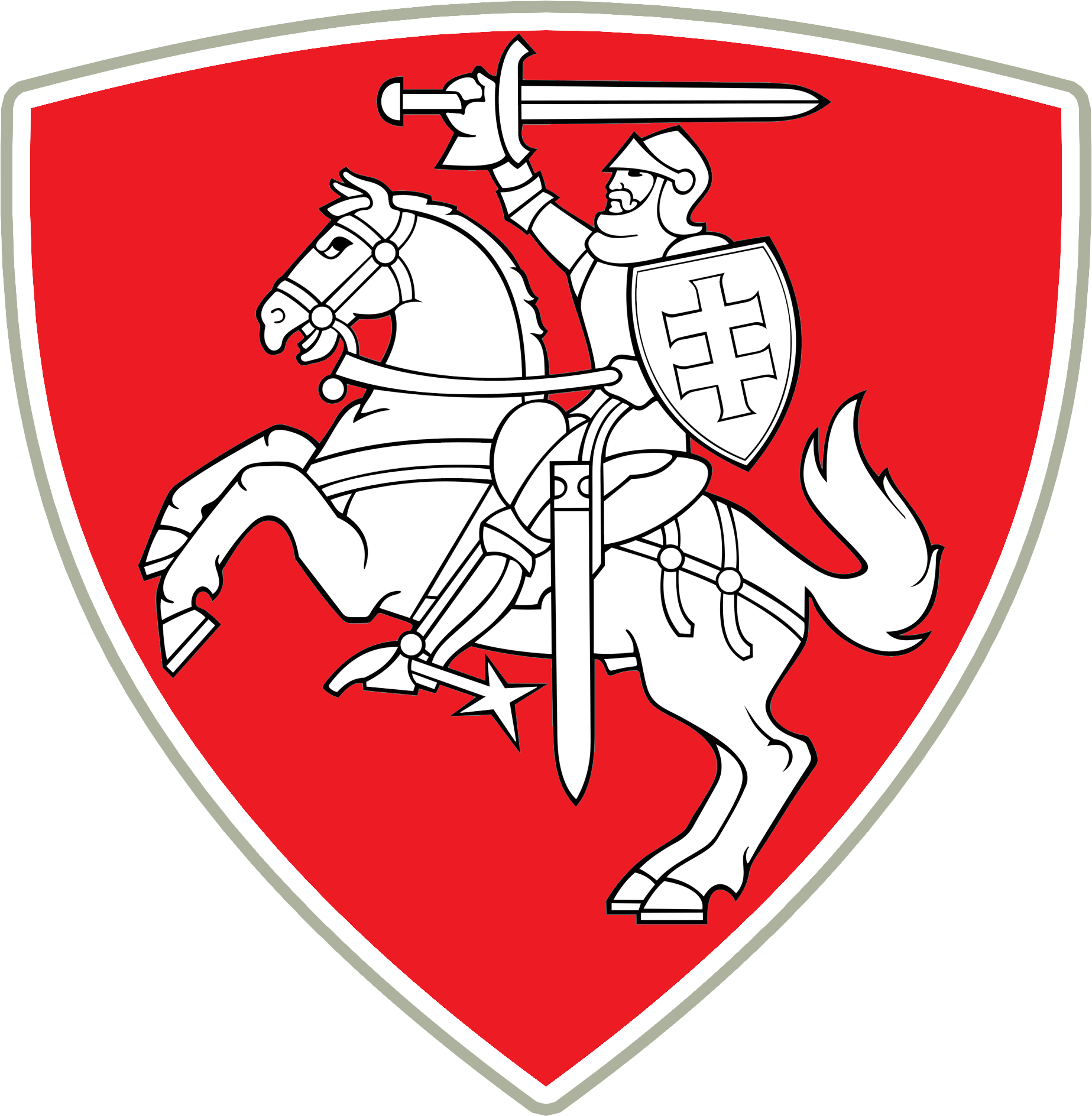
- Association: Lithuanian Ice Hockey Federation
- General manager: Eglė Kulikauskaitė
- Head coach: Mauras Baltrukonis
- Assistants: Ramunė Maleckienė; Edgar Rybakov
- Captain: Klara Miuller
- Most games: Klara Miuller (29)
- Top scorer: Klara Miuller (46)
- Most points: Klara Miuller (68)
- IIHF code: LTU

Ranking
- Current IIHF: 35 (▼2) (3 June 2026)
- Highest IIHF: 32 (2023)
- Lowest IIHF: 40 (first in 2020)

First international
- Lithuania 4–1 Hong Kong (Sofia, Bulgaria; 4 December 2019)

Biggest win
- Lithuania 10–3 South Africa (Belgrade, Serbia; 2 March 2025)

Biggest defeat
- Belgium 8–0 Lithuania (Sofia, Bulgaria; 7 April 2022)

World Championships
- Appearances: 6 (first in 2020)
- Best result: 30th (2026)

International record (W–L–T)
- 24–10–0

The Lithuania women's national ice hockey team is the women's national ice hockey team in Lithuania. As of April 2020, they are ranked 40th in the IIHF world rankings. The team is a new addition to Division III, joining for the 2020 Women's World Championship tournament. On 4 December 2019, they won their first game against Hong Kong, China, by a score of 4–2. They subsequently defeated Belgium by a score of 4–3. In their final game of the tournament, they lost to South Africa 4–2.

Forward Klara Miuller is the captain and the team's scoring leader, with 36 goals and 14 assist in 4 tournaments (2020-2024). Bernd Haake, from Germany, is the team's head coach. He is well known in Lithuania for his contribution to the development of the sport in the country.

Lithuania has been chosen to host the 2021 Women's World Championship, Division III.

== Tournament record ==
=== World Championships ===
- 2020 – Finished in 39th place (5th in Division III)
- 2021 – Cancelled due to the COVID-19 pandemic
- 2022 – Finished in 33rd place (2nd in Division IIIA)
- 2023 – Finished in 35th place (3rd in Division IIIA)
- 2024 – Finished in 37th place (3rd in Division IIIA)
- 2025 – Finished in 33rd place (1st in Division IIIA, promoted to Division IIB)
- 2026 – Finished in 30th lace (2nd in Division IIB)

=== Baltic Cup ===
- 2023 – Gold
