= Tnuvot =

Moshav in central Israel

Tnuvot: תְּנוּבוֹת (Hebrew)
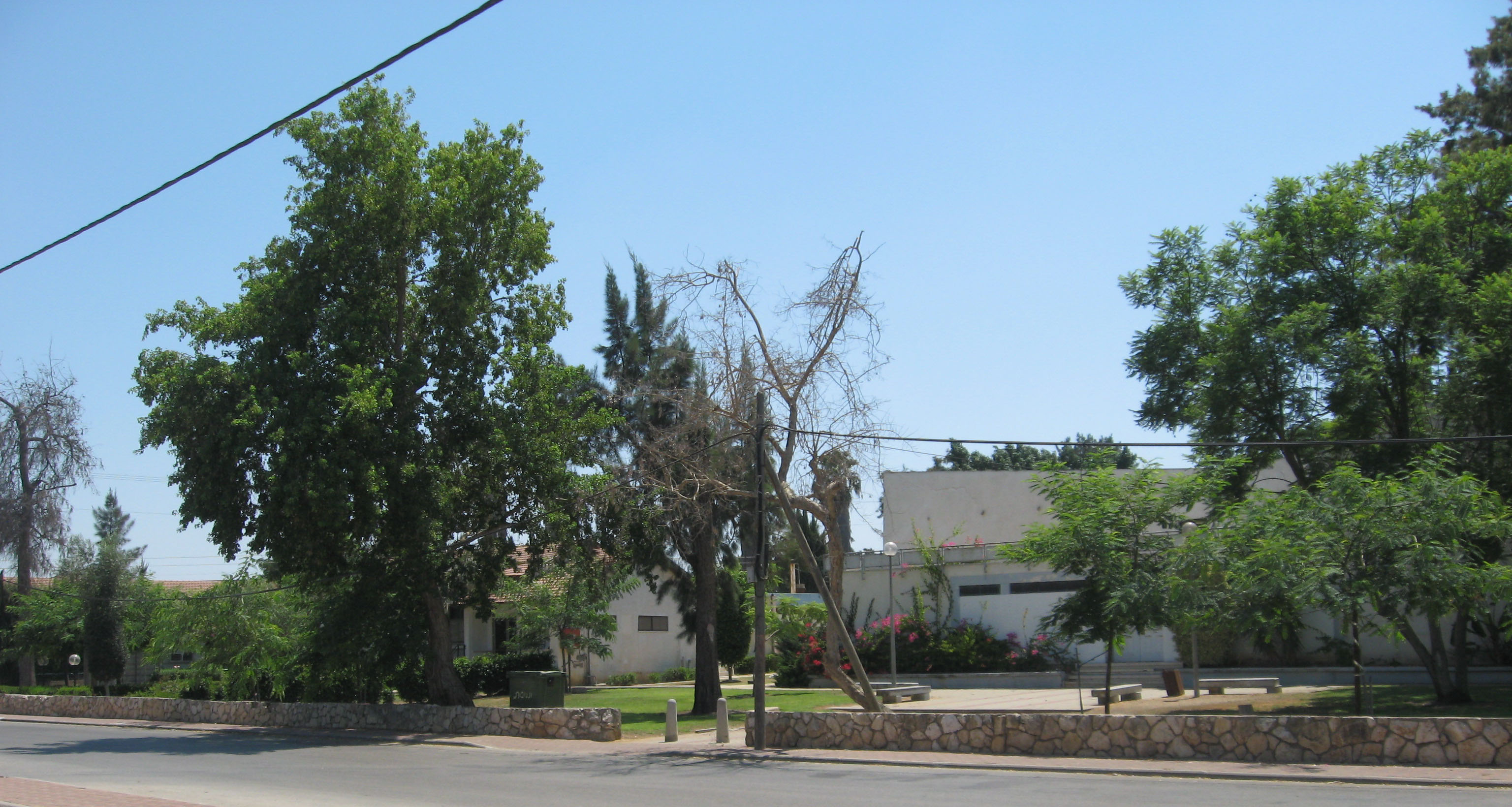

- Location within Central Israel
- Coordinates: 32°18′20″N 34°57′46″E
- Country: Israel
- District: Central
- Subdistrict: HaSharon
- Council: Lev HaSharon
- Affiliation: Moshavim Movement
- Founded: 1952
- Founder: Yemenite immigrants
- Population (2024): 974

Tnuvot (Hebrew: תְּנוּבוֹת, lit. 'Crops') is a moshav in central Israel. Located in the Sharon plain between Netanya and Tulkarm, it falls under the jurisdiction of Lev HaSharon Regional Council. In 2024 it had a population of 974.

== History ==
A historical ancient site with a mosaic from the Roman–Byzantine era, called "Tel Shevah" (Arabic Tall Subh) is located nearby, as is a landing strip for ultralight aviation. Before the 20th century the area formed part of the Forest of Sharon. It was an open woodland dominated by Mount Tabor Oak, which extended from Kfar Yona in the north to Ra'anana in the south. The local Arab inhabitants traditionally used the area for pasture, firewood and intermittent cultivation. The intensification of settlement and agriculture in the coastal plain during the 19th century led to deforestation and subsequent environmental degradation.

The village was founded in 1952, on land near Qalansawe, by Jewish immigrants from Yemen. Its name is symbolic for its agricultural base and was taken from the Bible by the verse : "He made him ride on the high places of the earth, and he did eat the fruitage of the field; and He made him to suck honey out of the crag, and oil out of the flinty rock" (Deuteronomy 32,13).
