= Bulgaria women's national ice hockey team =

Women's national ice hockey team

Bulgaria
- The coat of arms of Bulgaria is the badge used on national team jerseys.
- Association: Bulgarian Ice Hockey Federation
- General manager: Denitza Georgieva
- Head coach: Borislav Blagoev
- Assistants: Yanaki Gatchev
- Captain: Stefani Stoyanova
- Most games: Stefani Stoyanova (42)
- Top scorer: Stefani Stoyanova (16)
- Most points: Stefani Stoyanova (35)
- Team colors
- IIHF code: BUL

Ranking
- Current IIHF: 40 (▼3) (3 June 2026)
- Highest IIHF: 23 (2011)
- Lowest IIHF: 39 (2021)

First international
- Italy 41–0 Bulgaria (Liepāja, Latvia; 2 September 2008)

Biggest win
- Bulgaria 6–0 Singapore (Sarajevo, BIH; 15 February 2025)

Biggest defeat
- Slovakia 82–0 Bulgaria (Liepāja, Latvia; 6 September 2008)

World Championships
- Appearances: 14 (first in 2011)
- Best result: 33rd (2011)

International record (W–L–T)
- 13–50–0

The Bulgarian women's national ice hockey team (Bulgarian: Женски национален отбор по хокей на лед на България, romanized: Zhenski natsionalen otbor po khokeĭ na led na Bŭlgariya) represents Bulgaria in the IIHF Women's World Championship. The women's national team is controlled by Bulgarian Ice Hockey Federation. As of 2020, Bulgaria had 53 female players registered with the IIHF, down from 65 players in 2016. The Bulgarian women's national team ranked 38th in the world in 2020.

== Qualification tournament for the 2010 Olympics ==
The Bulgaria participated in the women's qualification tournament for the 2010 Winter Olympics in Vancouver. They played four games, facing Slovakia, Croatia, Italy, and Latvia. The team lost all four games in blowouts: 0–39 against Latvia, 1–30 against Croatia, 0–41 against Italy, and a record-setting 0–82 loss to Slovakia, which remains the highest goal differential ever recorded in an IIHF sanctioned match as of 2020. Tallied in the game against Croatia, the only goal was scored by forward Olga Gospodinova and assisted by the defensemen Elina Milanova and Sofiya Iliycheva.

== World Championship record ==
In 2011, the Bulgarian women's national team debuted at their first IIHF Women's World Championship tournament, competing in Division V. They were scheduled to compete in the 2009 Division V tournament in Gdańsk Poland, but the tournament was cancelled for financial reasons.

Year	Division result	Overall rank
(Bulgaria) 2011	3rd in Division V	33rd
(Turkey) 2013	2nd in Division II B	34th
(Mexico) 2014	3rd in Division II B	35th
(Hong Kong) 2015	4th in Division II B	36th
(Bulgaria) 2016	4th in Division II B	36th
(Chinese Taipei) 2017	4th in Division II B	36th
(Bulgaria) 2018	5th in Division II B	38th
(South Africa) 2019	5th in Division II B	39th
(Bulgaria) 2020	4th in Division III	38th
(Lithuania) 2021	Division III	Cancelled due to the COVID-19 pandemic
(Bulgaria) 2022	3rd in Division III A	34th
(Romania) 2023	5th in Division III A	37th
(Croatia) 2024	6th in Division III A	40th
(Bosnia and Herzegovina) 2025	1st in Division III B	41st
(Croatia) 2026	6th Division III A	40th
