= Bosnia and Herzegovina women's national ice hockey team =

Bosnia and Herzegovina
- Association: Bosnia and Herzegovina Ice Hockey Federation
- Head coach: Haris Mrkva
- Assistants: Benjamin Muhić
- Captain: Majda Hanić
- Most games: five players (20)
- Top scorer: Ava Lincender; Lamija Zubčević (13)
- Most points: Ava Lincender (22)
- IIHF code: BIH

Ranking
- Current IIHF: 43 (3 June 2026)
- Highest IIHF: 41 (2023)
- Lowest IIHF: 42 (first in 2021)

First international
- Serbia 11–0 Bosnia and Herzegovina (Sarajevo, BIH; 15 October 2021)

Biggest win
- Bosnia and Herzegovina 11–0 Singapore (Kohtla-Järve, Estonia; 6 March 2026)

Biggest defeat
- Serbia 18–0 Bosnia and Herzegovina (Novi Sad, Serbia; 12 November 2021)

World Championships
- Appearances: 5 (first in 2022)
- Best result: 37th (2022)

International record (W–L–T)
- 8–18–0

The Bosnia and Herzegovina women's national ice hockey team is the women's national ice hockey team of Bosnia and Herzegovina. The team is controlled by the Bosnia and Herzegovina Ice Hockey Federation, a member of the International Ice Hockey Federation.

== History ==
The team first played in an international tournament at the 2022 IIHF Women's World Championship Division III, the lowest IIHF women's hockey tier.

== World Championship record ==
- 2022 – Finished in 37th place (3rd in Division IIIB)
- 2023 – Finished in 41st place (3rd in Division IIIB)
- 2024 – Finished in 45th place (5th in Division IIIB)
- 2025 – Finished in 44th place (4th in Division IIIB)
- 2026 – Finished in 42nd place (2nd in Division IIIB)
