= Estonia women's national ice hockey team =

Women's national ice hockey team representing Estonia

Estonia
- Association: Estonian Ice Hockey Association
- General manager: Juri Rooba
- Head coach: Villem-Henrik Koitmaa
- Assistants: Artjom Rozenberg
- Captain: Grete Hollo
- Most games: Christin Lauk-Gurtovoi (27)
- Top scorer: Alexandra Stolyarova (14)
- Most points: Diana Kaareste (22)
- Team colors
- IIHF code: EST

Ranking
- Current IIHF: 41 (3 June 2026)
- Highest IIHF: 32 (first in 2007)
- Lowest IIHF: 41 (first in 2021)

First international
- Estonia 8–2 Iceland (Tallinn, Estonia; 25 November 2005)

Biggest win
- Estonia 14–1 Turkey (Miercurea-Ciuc, Romania; 27 March 2007)

Biggest defeat
- Latvia 15–0 Estonia (Valmiera, Latvia; 18 March 2006)

World Championships
- Appearances: 7 (first in 2007)
- Best result: 31st (in 2007, 2008)

International record (W–L–T)
- 18–22–0

The Estonia women's national ice hockey team (Estonian: Eesti naiste jäähokikoondis) is the women's national ice hockey team of Estonia. The team is controlled by the Estonian Ice Hockey Association, a member of the International Ice Hockey Federation.

== History ==
Estonia played its first game in 2005 in an exhibition game against Iceland, held in Tallinn, Estonia. Estonia won the game 8–2. The following year they competed at the Riga Tournament which was held in Valmiera, Latvia. Competing against Latvia, the Netherlands, and Norway, Estonia lost all three games with the 15–0 loss against Latvia being recorded as their worst ever result.

In 2007, Estonia competed at their first IIHF World Women's Championships. Placed in Division IV, they finished fourth, winning two of their five games. The following year Estonia competed at the 2008 IIHF Women's World Championship again winning two of their five games in Division IV.

After the Great Recession struck the world in 2008, the Estonian team halted activities, and would remain dormant until 2015, when former national team player Katrin Talvak gathered a group of players in Tallinn. In 2017, the Estonian Women's Hockey League (Estonian: Eesti Naiste Hokiliiga) was relaunched. The national team was due to return to competition at the 2021 IIHF Women's World Championship Division III, the lowest IIHF women's hockey tier, before the tournament was cancelled due to the COVID-19 pandemic. In December 2020, the team launched a documentary and fundraising project.

== Tournament record ==
=== World Championship ===
- 2007 – 4th in Division IV (31st overall)
- 2008 – 4th in Division IV (31st overall)
- 2021 – Cancelled due to the COVID-19 pandemic
- 2022 – 1st in Division III B (35th overall)
- 2023 – 6th in Division III A (38th overall)
- 2024 – 2nd in Division III B (42nd overall)
- 2025 – 3rd in Division III B (43rd overall)
- 2026 – 1st in Division III B (41st overall)

=== Other tournaments ===
- 2006 Riga Tournament – 4th

== All-time record against other nations ==
As of 14 September 2011

Team	GP	W	T	L	GF	GA
Turkey	2	2	0	0	22	2
Iceland	3	2	0	1	12	8
South Africa	1	1	0	0	2	1
Netherlands	1	0	0	1	0	5
Norway	1	0	0	1	0	8
Croatia	1	0	0	1	0	12
Latvia	1	0	0	1	0	15
Romania	2	0	0	2	3	13
New Zealand	2	0	0	2	1	13
