= Klara Miuller =

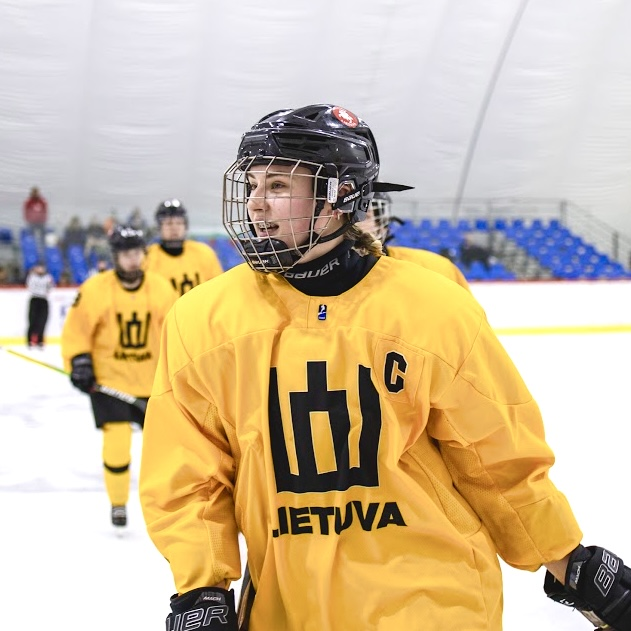
- Klara Miuller in a game of IIHF World Women's Championship division 3A in 2024
- Born: 4 November 2003 (age 22) Klaipėda, Lithuania
- Height: 5 ft 7 in (170 cm)
- Weight: 176 lb (80 kg; 12 st 8 lb)
- Position: Forward
- Shoots: Left
- Baltic (W) team: HC Klaipėda Girls
- National team: Lithuania
- Playing career: 2018–present

Klara Miuller (aka Klara Mueller or Klara Müller, born 4 November 2003) is a Lithuanian ice hockey player, captain of Lithuania's national ice hockey women's team.

== Playing career ==
Klara started playing ice hockey at the age of nine. In 2019, at the age of 16, she made her debut in the Lithuanian women's ice hockey team and was recognized as the best forward of the third division of the IIHF World Women's Championship of that year and the best player of the Lithuanian national team.

2020–2024 during the four world women's ice hockey championships, she scored 36 goals, made 14 assists and became the all-time leading player of the Lithuanian national team. 2022–2023 she became the best player in the Baltic Women's Ice Hockey Championship, scoring 36 goals in the regular season and 11 more in the playoffs. In 2024 Klara was elected captain of the Lithuanian women's ice hockey team and was awarded best player of team Lithuania after the 2024 third A division of the World Women's Ice Hockey Championship.

== Achievements ==
The following are Klara Miuller's career highlights by season:

2019–2020

- World Championship (D3|W) Best Forward
- World Championship (D3|W) Most Goals (9)
- World Championship (D3|W) Most Points (10)

2021–2022

- World Championship (D3A|W) Most Goals (9)
- World Championship (D3A|W) Silver Medal
- World Championship (D3A|W) Top Player on Team

2022–2023

- Baltic (W) Champion
- Baltic (W) Most Goals (36)
- Baltic (W) Most Points (46)
- Baltic (W) Playoffs Most Goals (11)
- Baltic (W) Playoffs Most Points (14)
- World Championship (D3A|W) Best Forward
- World Championship (D3A|W) Best Plus/Minus (+11)
- World Championship (D3A|W) Bronze Medal
- World Championship (D3A|W) Most Goals (13)
- World Championship (D3A|W) Most Points (18)
- World Championship (D3A|W) Top Player on Team

2023–2024

- World Championship (D3A|W) Bronze Medal
- World Championship (D3A|W) Top Player on Team
