= Kati Ahonen =

Finnish ice hockey goaltender (born 1966)

- Born: 7 November 1966 (age 59) Helsinki, Finland
- Height: 174 cm (5 ft 9 in)
- Weight: 68 kg (150 lb; 10 st 10 lb)
- Position: Goaltender
- Caught: Left
- Played for: Itä-Helsingin Kiekko; Kiekko-Espoo; Keravan Shakers; Tampereen Ilves
- National team: Finland
- Playing career: 1982–2001
Medal record
Women's ice hockey
Representing Finland
World Championship
Bronze medal – third place	1994 United States
Bronze medal – third place	1992 Finland
European Championship
Gold medal – first place	1995 Latvia
Gold medal – first place	1993 Denmark
Gold medal – first place	1991 Czechoslovakia
Gold medal – first place	1989 West Germany
Bronze medal – third place	1996 Russia

Katariina "Kati" Ahonen (born 7 November 1966) is a Finnish retired ice hockey goaltender. A ten-season member of the Finnish national ice hockey team, she won bronze medals at the IIHF Women's World Championships in 1992 and 1994, and participated in five IIHF European Women Championships, winning gold at the tournaments in 1989, 1991, 1993, and 1995, and bronze at the 1996 tournament.

At age 15, Ahonen debuted with the Tampereen Ilves Naiset in the inaugural season (1982–83) of the Naisten SM-sarja, the first national women’s ice hockey league in Finland. She went on to play a nineteen-season career in the league with the Tampereen Ilves Naiset, the Keravan Shakers, the Kiekko-Espoo Naiset (also under the name Espoo Blues Naiset), and the Itä-Helsingin Kiekko Naiset (IHK). During her playing career, Ahonen won the Finnish Championship eight times: four times with the Tampereen Ilves, in 1985, 1986, 1987, 1988; three times with the Keravan Shakers, in 1994, 1995, and 1996; and with the Espoo Blues in 1999.

== Career statistics ==
Year	Team	Event	Result	GP	W	L	T/OT	MIN	GA	SO	GAA	SV%
1994	Finland	WC	3rd place, bronze medalist(s)	2	-	-	-	80:00	1	-	0.75	0.950
