= 2016 Women's Ice Hockey World Championships =

Tournament details
- Host countries: Canada; Denmark; Italy; Slovenia; Spain; Bulgaria
- Venues: 7 (in 6 host cities)
- Teams: 36

Final positions
- Champions: United States (7th title)
- Runners-up: Canada
- Third place: Russia

The 2016 Women's World Ice Hockey Championships were the 19th such series of tournaments organized by the International Ice Hockey Federation. Teams participated at several levels of competition. These tournaments also served as qualifications for the 2017 competition and finalized seeding for the 2018 Winter Olympics qualification.

== Championship (Top Division) ==
The Top Division tournament was played in Kamloops, British Columbia, Canada, from 28 March to 4 April 2016.

Rank	Team
1st place, gold medalist(s)	United States
2nd place, silver medalist(s)	Canada
3rd place, bronze medalist(s)	Russia
4	Finland
5	Sweden
6	Czech Republic
7	Switzerland
8	Japan

Relegated to the 2017 Division I A

Quarterfinals
A4	Russia	4
B1	Sweden	1
A3	Finland	5
B2	Czech Republic	0

Semifinals
A1	United States	9
A4	Russia	0
A2	Canada	5
A3	Finland	3

Final
A1	United States (OT)	1
A2	Canada	0
Bronze medal game
A4	Russia (GWS)	1
A3	Finland	0

== Division I ==
=== Division I Group A ===
The Division I Group A tournament was played in Aalborg, Denmark, from 25 to 31 March 2016.

Pos	Team	Pld	W	OTW	OTL	L	GF	GA	GD	Pts	Promotion or relegation
1	Germany	5	4	0	0	1	16	7	+9	12 (Note: France 0–5 Germany)	Promoted to the 2017 Top Division
2	France	5	4	0	0	1	15	9	+6	12	
3	Austria	5	3	1	0	1	16	10	+6	11	
4	Denmark (H)	5	2	0	0	3	13	14	−1	6	
5	Norway	5	0	1	1	3	10	17	−7	3	
6	Slovakia	5	0	0	1	4	7	20	−13	1	Relegated to the 2017 Division I B

Source: IIHF
Rules for classification: 1) points; 2) head-to-head points; 3) head-to-head goal difference; 4) head-to-head number of goals scored; 5) result against closest best-ranked team outside tied teams; 6) result against second-best ranked team outside tied teams; 7) seeding before tournament.
(H) Host

=== Division I Group B ===
The Division I Group B tournament was played in Asiago, Italy, from 4 to 10 April 2016.

Pos	Team	Pld	W	OTW	OTL	L	GF	GA	GD	Pts	Promotion or relegation
1	Hungary	5	4	0	0	1	15	10	+5	12	Promoted to the 2017 Division I A
2	Latvia	5	3	0	0	2	16	15	+1	9	
3	Kazakhstan	5	2	0	1	2	13	14	−1	7	
4	Italy (H)	5	1	1	1	2	11	13	−2	6 (Note: Italy 3–2 China)	
5	China	5	2	0	0	3	10	10	0	6	
6	Netherlands	5	1	1	0	3	11	14	−3	5	Relegated to the 2017 Division II A

Source: IIHF
Rules for classification: 1) points; 2) head-to-head points; 3) head-to-head goal difference; 4) head-to-head number of goals scored; 5) result against closest best-ranked team outside tied teams; 6) result against second-best ranked team outside tied teams; 7) seeding before tournament.
(H) Host

== Division II ==
=== Division II Group A ===
The Division II Group A tournament was played in Bled, Slovenia, from 2 to 8 April 2016.

Pos	Team	Pld	W	OTW	OTL	L	GF	GA	GD	Pts	Promotion or relegation
1	Poland	5	4	0	0	1	37	9	+28	12 (Note: Poland 3 Pts, 3–3 GD; South Korea 3 Pts, 2–2 GD; Great Britain 3 Pts, 2–2 GD. After the tie is broken, head-to-head is used and South Korea defeated Great Britain 1–0.)	Promoted to the 2017 Division I B
2	South Korea	5	4	0	0	1	15	3	+12	12	
3	Great Britain	5	4	0	0	1	34	3	+31	12	
4	North Korea	5	2	0	0	3	21	23	−2	6	
5	Slovenia (H)	5	1	0	0	4	9	27	−18	3	
6	Croatia	5	0	0	0	5	4	55	−51	0	Relegated to the 2017 Division II B (Note: Croatia actually did not participate in 2017. Their next World Championship participation was in the 2018 Division II B Qualification.)

Source: IIHF
Rules for classification: 1) points; 2) head-to-head points; 3) head-to-head goal difference; 4) head-to-head number of goals scored; 5) result against closest best-ranked team outside tied teams; 6) result against second-best ranked team outside tied teams; 7) seeding before tournament.
(H) Host

=== Division II Group B ===
The Division II Group B tournament was played in Jaca, Spain, from 29 February to 6 March 2016.

Pos	Team	Pld	W	OTW	OTL	L	GF	GA	GD	Pts	Promotion or relegation
1	Australia	5	4	0	1	0	32	6	+26	13	Promoted to the 2017 Division II A
2	Spain (H)	5	4	0	0	1	26	8	+18	12	
3	Iceland	5	3	0	0	2	21	10	+11	9	
4	Mexico	5	2	1	0	2	13	9	+4	8	
5	New Zealand	5	1	0	0	4	13	40	−27	3	
6	Turkey	5	0	0	0	5	8	40	−32	0	Relegated to the 2017 Division II B Qualification

Source: IIHF
Rules for classification: 1) points; 2) head-to-head points; 3) head-to-head goal difference; 4) head-to-head number of goals scored; 5) result against closest best-ranked team outside tied teams; 6) result against second-best ranked team outside tied teams; 7) seeding before tournament.
(H) Host

=== Division II Group B Qualification ===
The Division II Group B Qualification tournament was played in Sofia, Bulgaria, from 7 to 10 December 2015.

Pos	Team	Pld	W	OTW	OTL	L	GF	GA	GD	Pts	Promotion
1	Romania	3	2	0	1	0	15	9	+6	7	Promoted to the 2017 Division II B
2	Hong Kong	3	2	0	0	1	15	9	+6	6	
3	South Africa	3	1	1	0	1	12	8	+4	5	
4	Bulgaria (H)	3	0	0	0	3	8	24	−16	0	

Source: IIHF
Rules for classification: 1) points; 2) head-to-head points; 3) head-to-head goal difference; 4) head-to-head number of goals scored; 5) result against closest best-ranked team outside tied teams; 6) result against second-best ranked team outside tied teams; 7) seeding before tournament.
(H) Host
