= 2000 Women's World Ice Hockey Championships (Lower Divisions) =

2000 IIHF World Women's Championship
Pool B

Tournament details
- Host country: Latvia
- Venue(s): Liepāja, Riga (in 1 host city)
- Dates: March 20 – March 26
- Teams: 8

Final positions
- Champions: Kazakhstan (1st title)

Tournament statistics
- Games played: 20
- Goals scored: 117 (5.85 per game)
- Attendance: 6,296 (315 per game)
- Scoring leader: (Switzerland) Rachel Rochat (4+4=8PTS)

The 2000 IIHF World Women's Championships Pool B were held between March 20–26, 2000 in the cities of Liepāja and Riga in Latvia. Kazakhstan won the tournament with an impressive performance winning all five of their matches. Additionally this advanced them to a qualification tournament for the Turin Olympics together with second place Switzerland, who narrowly edged out Norway for the privilege. Group 'B' changed its name to Division I following this season.

For the second year, a third tier tournament was played (called 2001 Pool B Qualification) in Székesfehérvár, Hungary.

== World Championship Group B ==
The eight participating teams were divided up into two seeded groups as below. The teams played each other once in a single round robin format. The top two teams from the group proceeded to the Final Round, while the remaining teams played in the Consolation Round. The teams would carry forward any matches against teams that they have already played in the first round, leaving just two matches to be played in the final round.

The winning team in the tournament was promoted to the 2001 World Championship, while the bottom team would be relegated to the 2003 Group B Qualification tournament.

=== First round ===
==== Group A ====
Pos	Team	Pld	W	D	L	GF	GA	GD	Pts	Qualification
1	Kazakhstan	3	3	0	0	8	3	+5	6	Advanced to Final round
2	Switzerland	3	2	0	1	10	4	+6	4	Advanced to Final round
3	Czech Republic	3	0	1	2	6	9	−3	1	Sent to Consolation round
4	Latvia	3	0	1	2	2	10	−8	1	Sent to Consolation round

Source: IIHF

==== Results ====
All times local

March 20, 2000; 4:00 pm	Switzerland	1–2 (0 – 1, 0 – 1, 1 – 0)	Kazakhstan	Attendance: 490

March 20, 2000; 7:00 pm	Czech Republic	2–2 (0 – 0, 2 – 1, 0 – 1)	Latvia	Attendance: 1050

March 21, 2000; 3:30 pm	Czech Republic	2–3 (0 – 1, 2 – 2, 0 – 0)	Kazakhstan	Attendance: 410

March 21, 2000; 7:00 pm	Latvia	0–5 (0 – 2, 0 – 1, 0 – 2)	Switzerland	Attendance: 980

March 23, 2000; 3:30 pm	Switzerland	4–2 (0 – 1, 2 – 1, 2 – 0)	Czech Republic	Attendance: 520

March 23, 2000; 7:00 pm	Kazakhstan	3–0 (1 – 0, 0 – 0, 2 – 0)	Latvia	Attendance: 964

==== Group B ====
Pos	Team	Pld	W	D	L	GF	GA	GD	Pts	Qualification
1	Norway	3	3	0	0	16	3	+13	6	Advanced to Final round
2	Denmark	3	1	1	1	8	5	+3	3	Advanced to Final round
3	France	3	1	1	1	12	10	+2	3	Sent to Consolation round
4	Italy	3	0	0	3	2	20	−18	0	Sent to Consolation round

Source: IIHF

==== Results ====
All times local

March 20, 2000; 4:00 pm	Norway	7–0 (2 – 0, 2 – 0, 3 – 0)	Italy

March 20, 2000; 7:00 pm	France	2–2 (0 – 0, 1 – 1, 1 – 1)	Denmark

March 22, 2000; 3:30 pm	France	8–2 (2 – 0, 2 – 0, 4 – 2)	Italy

March 22, 2000; 7:00 pm	Denmark	1–3 (0 – 1, 1 – 0, 0 – 2)	Norway

March 23, 2000; 3:30 pm	Norway	6–2 (2 – 0, 2 – 0, 2 – 2)	France

March 23, 2000; 7:00 pm	Italy	0–5 (0 – 2, 0 – 1, 0 – 2)	Denmark

=== Playoff round ===
==== Consolation Round 5–8 Place ====
Pos	Team	Pld	W	D	L	GF	GA	GD	Pts
5	France	3	2	1	0	12	5	+7	5
6	Latvia	3	1	2	0	7	5	+2	4
7	Czech Republic	3	1	1	1	9	5	+4	3
8	Italy	3	0	0	3	4	17	−13	0

Source: IIHF

==== Results ====
All times local

March 20, 2000; 4:00 pm	Latvia	2–2 (0 – 0, 2 – 1, 0 – 1)	Czech Republic	Attendance: 490

March 22, 2000; 7:00 pm	France	8–2 (2 – 0, 2 – 0, 4 – 2)	Italy

March 25, 2000; 1:00 pm	France	3–3 (0 – 1, 1 – 2, 2 – 0)	Latvia

March 25, 2000; 4:00 pm	Czech Republic	7–2 (1 – 1, 4 – 1, 2 – 0)	Italy

March 26, 2000; 1:00 pm	Czech Republic	0–1 (0 – 0, 0 – 1, 0 – 0)	France

March 26, 2000; 4:00 pm	Latvia	2–0 (0 – 0, 1 – 0, 1 – 0)	Italy	Attendance: 382

==== Final Round 1–4 Place ====
Pos	Team	Pld	W	D	L	GF	GA	GD	Pts
1	Kazakhstan	3	3	0	0	7	2	+5	6
2	Switzerland	3	1	1	1	7	4	+3	3
3	Norway	3	1	1	1	6	5	+1	3
4	Denmark	3	0	0	3	1	10	−9	0

Source: IIHF

==== Results ====
All times local

March 20, 2000; 4:00 pm	Switzerland	1–2 (0 – 1, 0 – 1, 1 – 0)	Kazakhstan	Attendance: 490

March 22, 2000; 7:00 pm	Denmark	1–3 (0 – 1, 1 – 0, 0 – 2)	Norway

March 25, 2000; 1:00 pm	Norway	2–2 (0 – 0, 2 -0, 0 – 2)	Switzerland

March 25, 2000; 4:00 pm	Kazakhstan	3–0 (0 – 0, 1 – 0, 2 – 0)	Denmark

March 26, 2000; 1:00 pm	Switzerland	4–0 (1 – 0, 0 – 0, 3 – 0)	Denmark

March 26, 2000; 4:00 pm	Kazakhstan	2–1 (1 – 0, 0 – 1, 1 – 0)	Norway

=== Scoring leaders ===
Player	GP	G	A	Pts	PIM	+/-
(Switzerland) Rachel Rochat	5	4	4	8	4	7
(France) Christine Duchamp	5	3	5	8	4	6
(France) Gwenola Personne	5	5	2	7	2	5
(Latvia) Inese Geca-Miljone	5	5	2	7	2	−1
(Norway) Marianne Dahlstrom	5	1	6	7	0	3
(Latvia) Iveta Koka	5	1	5	6	0	−1
(Norway) Ingvild Oversveen	5	4	1	5	2	2
(Switzerland) Jeanette Marty	5	4	1	5	8	6
(Switzerland) Ramona Fuhrer	5	3	2	5	2	6
(Kazakhstan) Olga Kryukova	5	1	4	5	2	5

=== Goaltending leaders ===
Player	Mins	GA	SOG	GAA	SV%
(Kazakhstan) Natalya Trunova	300:00	4	90	0.80	95.56
(Switzerland) Patricia Sautter	298:52	6	111	1.20	94.59
(Norway) Hege Moe	298:50	7	106	1.41	93.40
(Latvia) Lolita Andriševska	300:00	13	177	2.60	92.66
(Denmark) Birgitte Andersen	295:32	11	138	2.23	92.03

=== Champions ===
2000 IIHF World Women Championship Pool B winners

Kazakhstan
1st title

=== Final standings ===
Rk.	Team	Notes
1st place, gold medalist(s)	Kazakhstan	Promoted to the 2001 World Championships
2nd place, silver medalist(s)	Switzerland	
3rd place, bronze medalist(s)	Norway	
4.	Denmark	
5.	France	
6.	Latvia	
7.	Czech Republic	
8.	Italy	Relegated to the 2001 World Championships Division I Qualification

== 2001 Qualification Tournament ==
Two groups of four played a round robin with the group winners playing off for promotion to next years Division I tournament (Group B was renamed Division I). The tournament was played March 22–26, 2000 in Dunaújváros and Székesfehérvár Hungary.

=== First round ===
==== Group A ====
Pos	Team	Pld	W	D	L	GF	GA	GD	Pts	Qualification
1	Slovakia	3	3	0	0	39	0	+39	6	Advanced to Final
2	Belgium	3	2	0	1	11	10	+1	4	
3	Hungary	3	1	0	2	6	14	−8	2	
4	South Africa	3	0	0	3	3	35	−32	0	

Source: IIHF

==== Results ====
All times local

March 22, 2000; 1:00 pm	Slovakia	8–0 (2 – 0, 2 – 0, 4 – 0)	Belgium	Attendance: 300

March 22, 2000; 6:00 pm	Hungary	4–3 (1 – 0, 2 – 2, 1 – 1)	South Africa	Attendance: 850

March 23, 2000; 4:00 pm	South Africa	0–23 (0 – 5, 0 – 8, 0 – 10)	Slovakia	Attendance: 300

March 23, 2000; 6:00 pm	Hungary	2–3 (2 – 0, 0 – 0, 0 – 3)	Belgium	Attendance: 400

March 25, 2000; 4:00 pm	Slovakia	8–0 (4 – 0, 3 – 0, 1 – 0)	Hungary	Attendance: 310

March 25, 2000; 6:00 pm	Belgium	8–0 (1 – 0, 4 – 0, 3 – 0)	South Africa	Attendance: 400

==== Group B ====
Pos	Team	Pld	W	D	L	GF	GA	GD	Pts	Qualification
1	North Korea	3	2	1	0	14	5	+9	5	Advanced to Final
2	Great Britain	3	2	0	1	14	7	+7	4	
3	Netherlands	3	1	1	1	6	7	−1	3	
4	Australia	3	0	0	3	2	17	−15	0	

Source: IIHF

==== Results ====
All times local

March 22, 2000; 4:00 pm	Netherlands	2–0 (0 – 0, 1 – 0, 1 – 0)	Australia	Attendance: 300

March 22, 2000; 7:00 pm	Great Britain	2–4 (1 – 1, 0 – 2, 1 – 1)	North Korea	Attendance: 300

March 23, 2000; 1:00 pm	North Korea	2–2 (1 – 1, 1 – 1, 0 – 0)	Netherlands	Attendance: 300

March 23, 2000; 7:00 pm	Great Britain	7–1 (2 – 0, 1 – 1, 4 – 0)	Australia	Attendance: 300

March 25, 2000; 1:00 pm	Australia	1–8 (0 – 3, 1 – 2, 0 – 3)	North Korea	Attendance: 300

March 25, 2000; 7:00 pm	Netherlands	2–5 (1 – 2, 0 – 1, 1 – 2)	Great Britain	Attendance: 300

=== Final round ===
==== Match for seventh place ====
March 26, 2000	South Africa	0–6 (0 – 1, 0 – 2, 0 – 3)	Australia

==== Match for fifth place ====
March 26, 2000	Hungary	0–2 (0 – 1, 0 – 0, 0 – 1)	Netherlands

==== Match for third place ====
March 26, 2000	Belgium	1–8 (0 – 2, 0 – 4, 1 – 2)	Great Britain

==== Final ====
March 25, 2000	Slovakia	1–3 (1 – 0, 0 – 1, 0 – 2)	North Korea

North Korea qualified for the 2001 World Championship Division I.

=== Scoring leaders ===
Player	GP	G	A	Pts	PIM	+/-
(United Kingdom) Michelle Smith	4	9	2	11	4	14
(Slovakia) Zaneta Malachova	4	5	4	9	0	14
(Slovakia) Martina Kisova	4	6	2	8	0	12
(Slovakia) Marcela Stefanovicova	4	4	3	7	0	12
(United Kingdom) Laura Byrne	4	4	3	7	2	14
(Slovakia) Katarina Siskova	4	4	3	7	2	8
(United Kingdom) Louise Wheeler	4	1	6	7	2	12
(Netherlands) Saskia DeJong-Admiraal	4	5	1	6	4	4
(Belgium) Sara Verpoest	4	5	1	6	6	−1
(Slovakia) Katarina Buocikova	4	3	3	6	0	14

=== Goaltending leaders ===
Player	Mins	GA	SOG	GAA	SV%
(Slovakia) Andrea Risova	180:00	3	52	1.00	94.23
(Netherlands) Helena Kysela	198:26	4	57	1.21	92.98
(United Kingdom) Vicky Robbins	150:26	5	65	1.99	92.31
(Hungary) Eszter Kokenyesi	147:51	7	81	2.84	91.36
(Belgium) Isis Dhossche	120:00	8	54	4.00	85.19
