= 1999 Women's World Ice Hockey Championships (Lower Divisions) =

1999 IIHF World Women's Championship
Pool B

Tournament details
- Host country: France
- Venue: Colmar (in 1 host city)
- Dates: March 21 - March 28
- Teams: 8

Final positions
- Champions: Japan (1st title)

Tournament statistics
- Games played: 20
- Goals scored: 133 (6.65 per game)
- Attendance: 13,850 (693 per game)
- Scoring leader: (Japan) Masako Sato (12 points)

The 1999 IIHF World Women's Championships Pool B were held between March 21–28, 1999, in the town of Colmar in France.

This was the first year of the Pool B tournament which saw Japan win the Pool with a 7–1 final game victory over Norway to promote them to the World Championship. A third tier was played as well (called 2000 B Qualification) with six nations in Székesfehérvár, Hungary.

== 1999 Qualification Tournament ==
Group B contained the seven teams that failed to qualify for the main World Championships through the Qualification Process and Japan.

- Czech Republic
- Denmark
- France
- Japan
- Latvia
- Netherlands
- Norway
- Slovakia

== World Championship Group B ==
The eight participating teams were divided up into two seeded groups as below. The teams played each other once in a single round robin format. The top two teams from the group proceeded to the Final Round, while the remaining teams played in the consolation round.

The winning team in the tournament was promoted to the 2000 World Championship, while the bottom two teams would be relegated to the 2001 Group B Qualification tournament.

=== First round ===
==== Group A ====
Pos	Team	Pld	W	D	L	GF	GA	GD	Pts	Qualification
1	Japan	3	3	0	0	16	2	+14	6	Advanced to Final round
2	Norway	3	1	0	2	5	8	−3	2	Advanced to Final round
3	Denmark	3	1	0	2	5	11	−6	2	Sent to Consolation round
4	Latvia	3	1	0	2	5	10	−5	2	Sent to Consolation round

==== Results ====
All times local

March 22, 1999; 4:30 pm	Latvia	3 – 1 (1 - 0, 1 - 0, 1 - 1)	Denmark	Colmar; Attendance: 250

March 22, 1999; 8:00 pm	Norway	0 – 4 (0 - 1, 0 - 2, 0 - 1)	Japan	Colmar; Attendance: 250

March 24, 1999; 4:30 pm	Latvia	2 – 6 (1 - 2, 0 - 1, 0 - 2)	Japan	Colmar; Attendance: 200

March 24, 1999; 8:00 pm	Denmark	4 – 2 (1 - 0, 3 - 1, 0 - 1)	Norway	Colmar; Attendance: 300

March 25, 1999; 5:30 pm	Norway	3 – 0 (3 - 0, 0 - 0, 0 - 0)	Latvia	Colmar

March 25, 1999; 9:00 pm	Japan	6 – 0 (1 - 0, 3 - 0, 2 - 0)	Denmark	Colmar

==== Group B ====
Pos	Team	Pld	W	D	L	GF	GA	GD	Pts	Qualification
1	France	3	2	1	0	14	3	+11	5	Advanced to Final round
2	Czech Republic	3	2	1	0	14	4	+10	5	Advanced to Final round
3	Slovakia	3	1	0	2	6	8	−2	2	Sent to Consolation round
4	Netherlands	3	0	0	3	3	22	−19	0	Sent to Consolation round

==== Results ====
All times local

March 21, 1999; 5:00 pm	Czech Republic	9 – 0 (4 - 0, 1 - 0, 4 - 0)	Netherlands	Colmar; Attendance: 1000

March 21, 1999; 8:30 pm	France	3 – 0 (0 - 0, 2 - 0, 1 - 0)	Slovakia	Colmar; Attendance: 1300

March 23, 1999; 4:30 pm	Slovakia	2 – 3 (1 - 1, 1 - 0, 0 - 2)	Czech Republic	Colmar; Attendance: 250

March 23, 1999; 8:30 pm	France	9 – 1 (4 - 1, 2 - 0, 3 - 0)	Netherlands	Colmar; Attendance: 1000

March 25, 1999; 10:30 am	Netherlands	2 – 4 (0 - 0, 1 - 4, 1 - 0)	Slovakia	Colmar; Attendance: 1350

March 25, 1999; 2:00 pm	Czech Republic	2 – 2 (0 - 0, 2 - 1, 0 - 1)	France	Colmar; Attendance: 1350

=== Playoff round ===
==== Consolation round 5–8 place ====
March 27, 1999; 10:30 am	Denmark	9 – 1 (2 - 1, 4 - 0, 3 - 0)	Netherlands	Colmar

Netherlands relegated to 2001 Group B Qualification.

March 27, 1999; 2:00 pm	Latvia	8 – 0 (2 - 0, 5 - 0, 1 - 0)	Slovakia	Colmar

Slovakia relegated to 2001 Group B Qualification.

==== Consolation round 7–8 place ====
March 28, 1999; 9:30 am	Slovakia	8 – 7 (5 - 4, 1 - 1, 2 - 2)	Netherlands	Colmar

==== Consolation round 5–6 place ====
March 28, 1999; 1:00 pm	Denmark	3 – 5 (0 - 2, 1 - 1, 2 - 2)	Latvia	Colmar

=== Final round ===
Semi finals 27 March 1999
A1	Japan	2
B2	Czech Republic	1
B1	France	2
A2	Norway	3

Finals; 28 March 1999
Japan	7
Norway	1
Bronze Medal Game
France	5
Czech Republic	4

==== Semifinals ====
March 27, 1999; 5:30 pm	Japan	2 – 1 (1 - 0, 1 - 1, 0 - 0)	Czech Republic	Colmar

March 27, 1999; 9:00 pm	France	2 – 3 (1 - 2, 1 - 0, 0 - 1)	Norway	Colmar

==== Match for third place ====
March 28, 1999; 4:30 pm	France	5 – 4 (2 - 3, 1 - 0, 2 - 1)	Czech Republic	Colmar

==== Final ====
March 28, 1999; 8:00 pm	Japan	7 – 1 (2 - 1, 3 - 0, 2 - 0)	Norway	Colmar

=== Champions ===
1999 IIHF World Women Championship Pool B winners

Japan
1st title

=== Scoring leaders ===
Player	GP	G	A	Pts	PIM	+/-
(Japan) Masako Sato	5	8	4	12	4	6
(France) Gwenola Personne	5	2	9	11	2	13
(France) Christin Duchamp	4	7	3	10	2	14
(Latvia) Inese Geca-Miljone	5	7	3	10	4	1
(Czech Republic) Zuzana Králová	5	4	6	10	8	7
(Latvia) Iveta Koka	5	3	7	10	2	5
(Japan) Hanae Kubo	5	4	4	8	2	5
(Japan) Etsuko Wada	5	4	4	8	4	3
(Japan) Aki Tsuchida	5	2	5	7	8	5
(France) Deborah Iszraelewicz	5	5	1	6	2	13

=== Goaltending leaders ===
Player	Mins	GA	SOG	GAA	SV%
(Japan) Yuka Oda	261:51	3	72	0.69	95.83
(Latvia) Lolita Andrisevska	292:02	12	178	2.47	93.26
(Czech Republic) Ludmila Nelibová	290:58	11	126	2.27	91.27
(Norway) Hege Moe	175:11	11	102	3.77	89.22
(Netherlands) Desiree Jacobs	149:45	17	135	6.81	87.41

=== Final standings ===
Rk.	Team	Notes
1st place, gold medalist(s)	Japan	Promoted to the 2000 World Championships
2nd place, silver medalist(s)	Norway	
3rd place, bronze medalist(s)	France	
4.	Czech Republic	
5.	Latvia	
6.	Denmark	
7.	Slovakia	Relegated to the 2000 World Championships Group B Qualification
8.	Netherlands	Relegated to the 2000 World Championships Group B Qualification

== 2000 Qualification Tournament ==
Six additional nations played in two regional qualifiers for entry into the 2000 world championship group B. Both groups were played in Székesfehérvár, Hungary, with Group B being a best two out of three.

=== Group A ===
Pos	Team	Pld	W	D	L	GF	GA	GD	Pts
1	Italy	3	3	0	0	19	3	+16	6
2	Great Britain	3	2	0	1	32	5	+27	4
3	Hungary	3	1	0	2	8	17	−9	2
4	South Africa	3	0	0	3	1	35	−34	0

Italy qualified to 2000 World Championship Group B .

19 March 1999	Hungary	6-0 (1-0,3-0,2-0)	South Africa

19 March 1999	Italy	4-1 (0-0,1-1,3-0)	Great Britain

20 March 1999	Hungary	1-8 (0-3,1-4,0-1)	Italy

20 March 1999	South Africa	0-22 (0-8,0-2,0-12)	Great Britain

21 March 1999	South Africa	1-7 (0-0,1-3,0-4)	Italy

21 March 1999	Hungary	1-9 (0-1,1-5,0-3)	Great Britain

=== Group B ===
Pos	Team	Pld	W	D	L	GF	GA	GD	Pts
1	Kazakhstan	2	2	0	0	9	3	+6	4
2	North Korea	2	0	0	2	3	9	−6	0

Kazakhstan qualified to 2000 World Championship Group B .

19 March 1999	North Korea	3-4	Kazakhstan

21 March 1999	Kazakhstan	5-0 (forfeit)	North Korea

=== Scoring leaders ===
Player	GP	G	A	Pts	PIM	+/-
(United Kingdom) Michelle Smith	3	7	8	15	0	11
(United Kingdom) Louise Wheeler	3	5	9	14	0	11
(United Kingdom) Teresa Lewis	3	6	6	12	4	6
(Italy) Maria Leitner	3	5	3	8	0	3
(United Kingdom) Claire Oldfield	3	5	2	7	4	7
