= Katri Javanainen =

Finnish ice hockey player (born 1969)

- Born: 4 March 1969 (age 57)
- Position: Forward
- Played for: Porin Ässät
- National team: Finland
- Playing career: 1983–1992
Medal record
World Championship
| Bronze medal – third place | 1990 Canada |
European Championships
| Gold medal – first place | 1989 West Germany |
| Gold medal – first place | 1991 Czechoslovakia |

Katri Javanainen (born 4 March 1969) is a Finnish retired ice hockey player. As a member of the Finnish national ice hockey team, she won European Championship gold medals in 1989 and 1991 and a bronze medal at the 1990 IIHF Women's World Championship.

== Playing career ==
Javanainen's elite level club career was played in the Naisten SM-sarja with Porin Ässät. She was the second highest scoring player for Ässät during their tenure in the Naisten SM-sarja, tallying 71 goals and 38 assists for 109 points in 100 regular season games.

=== International ===
Javanainen represented Finland in a total of 30 A-level international matches during 1988 to 1991. During that span, she recorded 13 goals and 25 assists for 38 total points.

==== International statistics ====
| Year | Team | Event | Result | GP | G | A | Pts | PIM |
|---|---|---|---|---|---|---|---|---|
| 1989 | Finland | EC | 1st place, gold medalist(s) | 5 | 5 | 3 | 8 | 2 |
| 1990 | Finland | WW | 3rd place, bronze medalist(s) | 3 | 0 | 1 | 1 | 0 |
| 1991 | Finland | EC | 1st place, gold medalist(s) | 5 | 0 | 8 | 8 | 0 |
| Totals | | | | 13 | 5 | 12 | 17 | 2 |
