= 2020 IIHF Women's World Championship Division I =

Tournament details
- Host countries: France; Poland
- Venues: 2 (in 2 host cities)
- Dates: 12–18 April 2020 (cancelled); 28 March – 3 April 2020 (cancelled)
- Teams: 12

The 2020 IIHF Women's World Championship Division I was scheduled to be two international ice hockey tournaments organized by the International Ice Hockey Federation.

The Division I Group A tournament would have been played in Angers, France, from 12 to 18 April 2020, and the Division I Group B tournament in Katowice, Poland, from 28 March to 3 April 2020.

On 2 March 2020, the Division I Group B tournament was cancelled due to the COVID-19 pandemic. Five days later, the Division I Group A tournament was cancelled as well.

== Division I Group A ==
2020 IIHF Women's World Championship Division I A

Tournament details
- Host country: France
- Venue: 1 (in 1 host city)
- Dates: 12–18 April 2020
- Teams: 6

Official website
- www.iihf.com

=== Participating teams ===
Team	Qualification
Sweden	Placed 9th in Top Division previous year and were relegated.
France	Hosts; placed 10th in Top Division previous year and were relegated.
Norway	Placed 3rd in Division I A previous year.
Austria	Placed 4th in Division I A previous year.
Slovakia	Placed 5th in Division I A previous year.
Netherlands	Placed 1st in Division I B previous year and were promoted.

=== Match officials ===
Four referees and seven linesmen are selected for the tournament.

Referees	Linesmen
(Canada) Brandy Dewar; (Finland) Henna-Maria Koivuluoma; (Japan) Anna Kuroda; (United States) Jamie Huntley-Park	(Czech Republic) Veronika Lounová; (Finland) Jenni Jaatinen; (Germany) Julia Männlein; (Hungary) Adrienn Paulheim; (Poland) Joanna Pobożniak; (Sweden) Julia Johansson; (United States) Kristin Moore

=== Standings ===
Pos	Team	Pld	W	OTW	OTL	L	GF	GA	GD	Pts
1	Sweden	0	0	0	0	0	0	0	0	0
2	France (H)	0	0	0	0	0	0	0	0	0
3	Norway	0	0	0	0	0	0	0	0	0
4	Austria	0	0	0	0	0	0	0	0	0
5	Slovakia	0	0	0	0	0	0	0	0	0
6	Netherlands	0	0	0	0	0	0	0	0	0

Source: IIHF
(H) Host

=== Schedule ===
All times are local (Central European Summer Time – UTC+2).

12 April 2020; 12:30	Netherlands	Cancelled	Sweden	Patinoire du Haras, Angers

12 April 2020; 16:00	Austria	Cancelled	France	Patinoire du Haras, Angers

12 April 2020; 19:30	Slovakia	Cancelled	Norway	Patinoire du Haras, Angers

13 April 2020; 12:30	Sweden	Cancelled	Austria	Patinoire du Haras, Angers

13 April 2020; 16:00	Norway	Cancelled	Netherlands	Patinoire du Haras, Angers

13 April 2020; 19:30	France	Cancelled	Slovakia	Patinoire du Haras, Angers

15 April 2020; 12:30	Sweden	Cancelled	Slovakia	Patinoire du Haras, Angers

15 April 2020; 16:00	Netherlands	Cancelled	Austria	Patinoire du Haras, Angers

15 April 2020; 19:30	France	Cancelled	Norway	Patinoire du Haras, Angers

16 April 2020; 12:30	Austria	Cancelled	Slovakia	Patinoire du Haras, Angers

16 April 2020; 16:00	Norway	Cancelled	Sweden	Patinoire du Haras, Angers

16 April 2020; 19:30	France	Cancelled	Netherlands	Patinoire du Haras, Angers

18 April 2020; 12:30	Norway	Cancelled	Austria	Patinoire du Haras, Angers

18 April 2020; 16:00	Slovakia	Cancelled	Netherlands	Patinoire du Haras, Angers

18 April 2020; 19:30	Sweden	Cancelled	France	Patinoire du Haras, Angers

== Division I Group B ==
2020 IIHF Women's World Championship Division I B

Tournament details
- Host country: Poland
- Venue: 1 (in 1 host city)
- Dates: 28 March – 3 April 2020
- Teams: 6

Official website
- www.iihf.com

=== Participating teams ===
Team	Qualification
Italy	Placed 6th in Division I A previous year and were relegated.
South Korea	Placed 2nd in Division I B previous year.
Poland	Hosts; placed 3rd in Division I B previous year.
China	Placed 4th in Division I B previous year.
Kazakhstan	Placed 5th in Division I B previous year.
Slovenia	Placed 1st in Division II A previous year and were promoted.

=== Match officials ===
Four referees and seven linesmen are selected for the tournament.

Referees	Linesmen
(Finland) Johanna Tauriainen; (Germany) Svenja Strohmenger; (Latvia) Sintija Čamāne; (Russia) Yelizaveta Kolchina	(Canada) Geneviève Gouin; (Czech Republic) Zuzana Svobodová; (France) Sueva Torribio Rousselin; (Italy) Jessica Brambilla; (Japan) Mai Mizuhori; (Norway) Anette Fjeldstad; (United States) Jennifer Cameron

=== Standings ===
Pos	Team	Pld	W	OTW	OTL	L	GF	GA	GD	Pts
1	Italy	0	0	0	0	0	0	0	0	0
2	South Korea	0	0	0	0	0	0	0	0	0
3	Poland (H)	0	0	0	0	0	0	0	0	0
4	China	0	0	0	0	0	0	0	0	0
5	Kazakhstan	0	0	0	0	0	0	0	0	0
6	Slovenia	0	0	0	0	0	0	0	0	0

Source: IIHF
(H) Host

=== Schedule ===
All times are local (Central European Summer Time – UTC+2).

28 March 2020; 13:00	Slovenia	Cancelled	Italy	Katowice Jantor, Katowice

28 March 2020; 16:30	China	Cancelled	South Korea	Katowice Jantor, Katowice

28 March 2020; 20:00	Kazakhstan	Cancelled	Poland	Katowice Jantor, Katowice

29 March 2020; 13:00	South Korea	Cancelled	Kazakhstan	Katowice Jantor, Katowice

29 March 2020; 16:30	Italy	Cancelled	China	Katowice Jantor, Katowice

29 March 2020; 20:00	Poland	Cancelled	Slovenia	Katowice Jantor, Katowice

31 March 2020; 13:00	Slovenia	Cancelled	China	Katowice Jantor, Katowice

31 March 2020; 16:30	Italy	Cancelled	Kazakhstan	Katowice Jantor, Katowice

31 March 2020; 20:00	South Korea	Cancelled	Poland	Katowice Jantor, Katowice

1 April 2020; 13:00	China	Cancelled	Kazakhstan	Katowice Jantor, Katowice

1 April 2020; 16:30	South Korea	Cancelled	Slovenia	Katowice Jantor, Katowice

1 April 2020; 20:00	Poland	Cancelled	Italy	Katowice Jantor, Katowice

3 April 2020; 13:00	Italy	Cancelled	South Korea	Katowice Jantor, Katowice

3 April 2020; 16:30	Kazakhstan	Cancelled	Slovenia	Katowice Jantor, Katowice

3 April 2020; 20:00	Poland	Cancelled	China	Katowice Jantor, Katowice
