= Javanainen =

Javanainen is a surname. Notable people with the surname include:

- Arto Javanainen (1959–2011), Finnish ice hockey player
- Katri Javanainen (born 1969), Finnish ice hockey player
