= Czechoslovakia women's national ice hockey team =

Czechoslovakia
- Team colors
- IIHF code: TCH

First international
- Switzerland 8–1 Czechoslovakia (Beroun, Czechoslovakia; 2 April 1988)

Biggest win
- Czechoslovakia 7–1 Netherlands (West Germany; 9 April 1989)

Biggest defeat
- Finland 34–0 Czechoslovakia (West Germany; 4 April 1989)

IIHF European Women Championships
- Appearances: 2 (first in 1989)
- Best result: 7th (in 1989)

International record (W–L–T)
- 2–9–2

The Czechoslovakia women's national ice hockey team was the women's national ice hockey team of Czechoslovakia. The team was succeeded by the national women's teams of the Czech Republic and Slovakia following the split of Czechoslovakia in 1992.

== History ==
The first game played by a women's ice hockey team from Czechoslovakia was on 6 February 1985, where a team put together by coach Václav Roztočil played a team from Bergisch Gladbach, West Germany and won 2–1. Roztočil had discovered that women played ice hockey while accompanying a men's team to a match in West Germany, and recruited female players after being told by the Czechoslovak federation that none existed.

The Czechoslovakia national team played its first game in 1988 in an exhibition game against Switzerland, held in Beroun, Czechoslovakia, which they lost 8–1. The following year Czechoslovakia competed in a two-game qualification event against France in order to participate in the 1989 Women's European Ice Hockey Championships. Czechoslovakia defeated France 5–2 on aggregate, winning a spot in Group B for the 1989 tournament. During the group stage of the European Championships lost all three of their games, including a loss of 31–0 to Finland, which was recorded as Czechoslovakia's worst ever defeat. After finishing last in their group the team was drawn against Switzerland in a placement game for positions five to eight, with the other game being played between Denmark and the Netherlands. After losing to Switzerland, Czechoslovakia played the Netherlands for seventh place who had lost their game against Denmark. Czechoslovakia won the game 7–1 taking seventh in the rankings.

In 1991 Czechoslovakia fielded a team at the 1991 Women's European Ice Hockey Championships where they were placed in Group B. After losing three of their group stage games and tying in the fourth against Great Britain, Czechoslovakia was drawn in a placement game against France for seventh place. France won the game 2–1, taking seventh place in the rankings.

In 1993, the country of Czechoslovakia was split into the Czech Republic and Slovakia and so the Czechoslovak women's national team was disbanded and succeeded by the Czech and Slovak women's national ice hockey teams.

== International competitions ==
- 1989 Women's European Ice Hockey Championships. Finish: 7th
- 1991 Women's European Ice Hockey Championships. Finish: 8th

== See also ==
- Czechoslovakia men's national ice hockey team
