= 2016 World Ice Hockey Championships =

2016 World Ice Hockey Championships may refer to:

- 2016 Men's World Ice Hockey Championships
- 2016 Women's Ice Hockey World Championships
- 2016 World Junior Ice Hockey Championships
- 2016 IIHF World U18 Championships
