= Iveta Koka =

Latvian ice hockey player

- Born: 9 March 1982 (age 43)
- Height: 170 cm (5 ft 7 in)
- Weight: 65 kg (143 lb; 10 st 3 lb)
- Position: Left wing
- Shoots: Left
- Damettan team Former teams: Haninge Anchors HC; AIK Hockey; Leksands IF; HC Tornado
- National team: Latvia
- Playing career: 1995–present

Iveta Koka (born 9 March 1982) is a Latvian ice hockey forward, currently playing in the Swedish Damettan with the women's representative team of Haninge Anchors HC. She began playing with the Latvian national team in 1995 and holds the title for most career points in team history. During her nine-season career in the Swedish Women's Hockey League (SDHL), she scored over 240 points and is the all-time leading scorer from Latvia.

== Playing career ==
Early in her career, Koka played in the Russian Women's Hockey League with HC Tornado and in the Swiss Leistungsklasse A with the Ladies Team Lugano. From 2012 to 2018, she played for Leksands IF Dam in the Riksserien (renamed SDHL in 2016), putting up over a point per game with 179 points (81 goals + 98 assists) in 176 games for the club. As of 2021, she stands as the third highest scorer in Leksands history.

After leaving Leksands, she joined AIK Hockey Dam in Stockholm for the 2018–19 SDHL season. After scoring only 6 points in 19 games in the 2019–20 SDHL season, she signed an extension with the club and posted 4 points in her first 7 games of the 2020–21 season.

== International play ==
Koka made her debut with the Latvian national team at the 1995 IIHF European Women Championships, several weeks after her thirteenth birthday. Her next major international tournament was the 1999 Women's World Ice Hockey Championships – Pool B, the first lower-divisions tournament to be organized under the IIHF Women's World Championship, where she recorded 3 goals and 7 assists (10 points) in five games and was selected as Best Forward of the tournament by the directorate. She scored six points in five games at the lower divisions championships the next year, held in her native Latvia.

After Latvia was relegated in 2008, she scored 20 points in 5 games at the 2009 IIHF Women's World Championship Division II, earning honors as tournament MVP, contributing significantly to Latvia's undefeated streak and leading the team to gaining promotion right back to Division I. In 2014, she captained the country to promotion from Division 1B to 1A.

In total, Koka served as Latvian national team captain during six international seasons, most recently during the qualification tournament for the 2018 Winter Olympics.
