= South Africa women's national ice hockey team =

South Africa
- The flag of South Africa is the badge used on the players jerseys
- Association: South African Ice Hockey Association
- Head coach: Jean-Michel van Doesburgh
- Assistants: Ettiene Retief
- Captain: Donne van Doesburgh
- Most games: Donne van Doesburgh (72)
- Top scorer: Dalene Rhode (43)
- Most points: Donne van Doesburgh; Dalene Rhode (64)
- Team colors
- IIHF code: RSA

Ranking
- Current IIHF: 34 (▲1) (3 June 2026)
- Highest IIHF: 23 (2003)
- Lowest IIHF: 38 (2022)

First international
- Hungary 6–0 South Africa (Székesfehérvár, Hungary; 19 March 1999)

Biggest win
- South Africa 11–0 Bulgaria (Taipei, Republic of China; 15 December 2016)

Biggest defeat
- Great Britain 27–0 South Africa (Sheffield, United Kingdom; 9 March 2007)

World Championships
- Appearances: 22 (first in 1999)
- Best result: 23rd (2001)

International record (W–L–T)
- 23–71–1

The South Africa women's national ice hockey team represents South Africa at the International Ice Hockey Federation's IIHF World Women's Championships. The women's national team is controlled by South African Ice Hockey Association. The South African national team is the only national women's ice hockey team on the entire African continent. As of 2012, South Africa has 52 female players. The South Africa women's national team is ranked 32nd in the world.

== History ==
The South African women's national ice hockey team has participated in International Ice Hockey Federation events since the 1999 IIHF Women's World Championship. At their first World Championship in 1999, the team were unable to qualify for the B World Championship held the next year. In the following year, they were again unable to qualify for the B World Championship and were relegated several times over the following years, competing at the 2008 IIHF Women's World Championship in Division IV, the fifth World Championship level in women's ice hockey. As Divisions III to V saw no match play at the 2009 World Championship and there was no IIHF World Women's Championship in 2010 because of the Vancouver 2010 Winter Olympics, South Africa played their first World Championships match in three years in 2011, competing in Division IV.

== Tournament record ==
=== Olympic games ===
South Africa hockey team has never qualified for an Olympic tournament.

=== World Championship ===
- 1999 – Not ranked (4th in 2000 Group B Qualification Pool A)
- 2000 – Finished in 24th place (8th in 2001 Group B Qualification)
- 2001 – Finished in 23rd place (4th in 2003 Division I Qualification Group A)
- 2003 – Finished in 25th place (5th in Division III)
- 2005 – Finished in 26th place (6th in Division III)
- 2007 – Finished in 27th place (6th in Division III, Relegated to Division IV)
- 2008 – Finished in 32nd place (5th in Division IV)
- 2009 – Division IV canceled
- 2011 – Finished in 30th place (5th in Division IV)
- 2012 – Finished in 32nd place (6th in Division IIB)
- 2013 – Finished in 32nd place (6th in Division IIB, Relegated to Division IIB Qualification)
- 2014 – Finished in 34th place (2nd in Division IIB Qualification)
- 2015 – Finished in 35th place (3rd in Division IIB Qualification)
- 2016 – Finished in 35th place (3rd in Division IIB Qualification)
- 2017 – Finished in 35th place (3rd in Division IIB Qualification)
- 2018 – Finished in 36th place (3rd in Division IIB Qualification)
- 2019 – Finished in 37th place (3rd in Division IIB Qualification)
- 2020 – Finished in 35th place (1st in Division III, Promoted to Division IIB)
- 2021 – Cancelled due to the COVID-19 pandemic
- 2022 – Finished in 30th place (4th in Division IIB)
- 2023 – Finished in 31st place (4th in Division IIB)
- 2024 – Finished in 34rd place (6th in Division IIB, Relegated to Division IIIA)
- 2025 – Finished in 38th place (6th in Division IIIA, Relegated to Division IIIB)
- 2026 – Finished in 43rd place (3rd in Division IIIB)

== All-time record against other teams ==
As of 6 March 2026

Opponent	GP	W	L	T	GF	GA	GD	Win %
Australia	7	0	7	0	2	84	−82	0.00%
Austria	1	0	1	0	2	7	−5	0.00%
Belgium	12	2	10	0	18	68	−50	16.67%
Bosnia and Herzegovina	1	0	1	0	2	3	−1	0.00%
Bulgaria	7	7	0	0	40	9	+31	100.00%
Chinese Taipei	1	0	1	0	1	7	−6	0.00%
Croatia	5	2	3	0	9	31	−22	40.00%
Estonia	2	0	2	0	1	9	−8	0.00%
Great Britain	3	0	3	0	0	68	−68	0.00%
Hong Kong	8	5	3	0	39	18	+21	62.50%
Hungary	5	0	4	1	7	35	−28	0.00%
Iceland	5	0	5	0	6	35	−29	0.00%
Israel	1	1	0	0	3	1	+2	100.00%
Italy	2	0	2	0	2	16	−14	0.00%
Lithuania	2	1	1	0	7	12	−5	50.00%
Mexico	1	0	1	0	0	5	−5	0.00%
Netherlands	1	0	1	0	2	6	−4	0.00%
New Zealand	4	0	4	0	4	35	−31	0.00%
North Korea	1	0	1	0	0	14	−14	0.00%
Philippines	1	0	1	0	1	2	−1	0.00%
Poland	1	0	1	0	0	18	−18	0.00%
Romania	7	3	4	0	21	37	−16	42.86%
Serbia	1	0	1	0	3	9	−6	0.00%
Singapore	1	1	0	0	5	1	+4	100.00%
Slovakia	1	0	1	0	0	23	−23	0.00%
Slovenia	2	0	2	0	3	25	−22	0.00%
South Korea	4	0	4	0	4	31	−27	0.00%
Spain	2	0	2	0	1	24	−23	0.00%
Thailand	1	0	1	0	1	6	−5	0.00%
Turkey	4	1	3	0	13	27	−14	25.00%
Ukraine	1	0	1	0	1	3	−2	0.00%
Total	95	23	71	1	198	669	−471	24.21%
