= André Lysenstøen =

Norwegian ice hockey player and coach (born 1988)

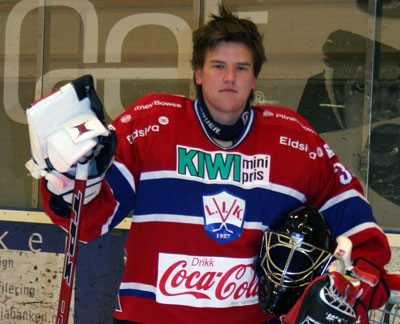
- Lysenstøen with Lillehammer IK in 2006
- Born: 27 October 1988 (age 36); Oslo, Norway
- Height: 1.94 m (6 ft 4 in)
- Weight: 112 kg (247 lb; 17 st 9 lb)
- Position: Goaltender
- Caught: Left
- Played for: Lillehammer IK; Stavanger Oilers; HeKi; Manglerud Star
- Current coach: Norway
- Coached for: Manglerud Star; Norway U18; Norway U18; Lillehammer IK; Norway U20; Vålerenga; Narvik IK
- National team: Norway
- Playing career: 2004–2012
- Coaching career: 2011–present

André Lysenstøen (born 27 October 1988) is a Norwegian ice hockey coach and former professional ice hockey goaltender. He has served as head coach of the Norwegian women's national ice hockey team since 2023. During his goaltending career, Lysenstøen played in the Norwegian Eliteserien with Lillehammer IK, the Stavanger Oilers, and Manglerud Star, and in the Finnish Mestis with HeKi.

== Playing career ==
=== International play ===
As a junior ice hockey player with the Norwegian national under-18 team, Lysenstøen participated in the 2006 IIHF World U18 Championships. He went on to represent Norway with the national under-20 ice hockey team at the IIHF World Junior Championship in 2007 and 2008.

With the Norwegian national ice hockey team, Lysenstøen participated in the Ice Hockey World Championships in 2008, 2009, and 2010. He represented Norway in the men's ice hockey tournament at the 2010 Winter Olympics in Vancouver, Canada.
