= Sweden women's national ice hockey team =

Women's national ice hockey team representing Sweden

Sweden
- Nickname: Damkronorna ('The Lady Crowns')
- Association: Swedish Ice Hockey Association
- General manager: Anders Lundberg
- Head coach: Erika Holst
- Assistants: Johan Andersson; Pernilla Winberg
- Captain: Anna Kjellbin
- Most games: Erika Holst (327)
- Most points: Erika Holst (233)
- Team colors
- IIHF code: SWE
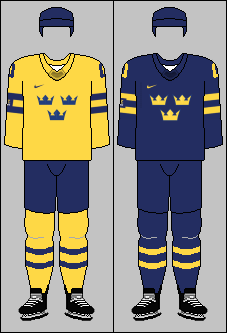

Ranking
- Current IIHF: 6 ▲1 (3 June 2026)
- Highest IIHF: 3 (first in 2006)
- Lowest IIHF: 9 (first in 2020)

First international
- United States 10–0 Sweden (North York or Mississauga, Canada; 22 April 1987)

Biggest win
- Sweden 17–0 Norway (Haninge, Sweden; 18 March 2000)

Biggest defeat
- Canada 15–1 Sweden (Ottawa, Canada; 19 March 1990)

Olympics
- Appearances: 8 (first in 1998)
- Medals: Silver (2006); Bronze (2002)

World Championship
- Appearances: 24 (first in 1990)
- Best result: (bronze) (2005, 2007, 2026)

European Championship
- Appearances: 5 (first in 1989)
- Best result: (gold) (1996)

International record (W–L–T)
- 285–297–15

Medal record

Olympic Games
Silver medal – second place	2006 Turin	Team
Bronze medal – third place	2002 Salt Lake City	Team

World Championship
Bronze medal – third place	2005 Sweden	
Bronze medal – third place	2007 Canada	
Bronze medal – third place	2026 Denmark	

European Championship
Gold medal – first place	1996 Russia	
Silver medal – second place	1989 West Germany	
Silver medal – second place	1991 Czechoslovakia	
Silver medal – second place	1993 Denmark	
Silver medal – second place	1995 Latvia	

The Swedish women's national ice hockey team (Swedish: Sveriges damlandslag i ishockey), also known by the Swedish nickname Damkronorna (lit. 'the Lady Crowns'), represents Sweden in international ice hockey competition, including the International Ice Hockey Federation's Women's World Championship and at the Olympic Games. The women's national team is organized by the Swedish Ice Hockey Association.

Ice hockey is popular among women and girls in Sweden and the Swedish Ice Hockey Association reported 10,908 female players registered with the IIHF in 2026 – an increase of more than three times the 3,425 players on record in 2011.

== History ==
In the early years of international women's ice hockey competition, the Swedish team was generally viewed as the fourth-best women's team in the world, behind Canada, the United States, and Finland. During the 1997 World Championship, Sweden qualified for the 1998 Olympic tournament in Nagano, at which the team finished in fifth place.

However, the team has shown steady improvement since 2001, winning bronze medals at the 2002 Winter Olympics, the 2005 IIHF Women's World Championship, and the 2007 IIHF Women's World Championship, and a silver medal at the 2006 Winter Olympics.

On 31 August 2011, Canada was bested by Sweden for just the second time in 66 all-time international meetings. Canada suffered from a 4–1 second-period deficit and lost by a 6–4 score.

On 9 April 2019, at the 2019 World Championship in Espoo, Finland, Sweden lost to Japan 3–2. Sweden was relegated to Division I for the first time in Women's Worlds history.

Ulf Lundberg was hired to replace Ylva Martinsen as head coach following the 2019 World Championship.

On 16 November 2026, Sweden won the bronze medal at the 2026 World Championship in Denmark by defeating Finland, 2–1 following penalty shootout, in the bronze medal game. It was the first Swedish World Championship since 2007.

=== Records ===
- Sweden was the first country from outside of North America to compete in the finals of any international women's hockey tournament.
- On 7 November 2008, in Lake Placid, Sweden defeated Canada for the first time in women's ice hockey with the 2–1 win in overtime at the 4 Nations Cup.

== Tournament record ==
=== Olympic Games ===
- 1998 – Finished in 5th place
- 2002 – Won bronze medal
- 2006 – Won silver medal
- 2010 – Finished in 4th place
- 2014 – Finished in 4th place
- 2018 – Finished in 7th place
- 2022 – Finished in 8th place
- 2026 – Finished in 4th place

=== World Championship ===
- 1990 – Finished in 4th place
- 1992 – Finished in 4th place
- 1994 – Finished in 5th place
- 1997 – Finished in 5th place
- 1999 – Finished in 4th place
- 2000 – Finished in 4th place
- 2001 – Finished in 7th place
- 2004 – Finished in 4th place
- 2005 – Won bronze medal
- 2007 – Won bronze medal
- 2008 – Finished in 5th place
- 2009 – Finished in 4th place
- 2011 – Finished in 5th place
- 2012 – Finished in 5th place
- 2013 – Finished in 7th place
- 2015 – Finished in 5th place
- 2016 – Finished in 5th place
- 2017 – Finished in 6th place
- 2019 – Finished in 9th place (relegated to Division IA)
- 2020 – Cancelled due to the COVID-19 pandemic
- 2021 – Cancelled due to the COVID-19 pandemic
- 2022 – Finished in 7th place
- 2023 – Finished in 6th place
- 2024 – Finished in 7th place
- 2025 – Finished in 6th place
- 2026 – Won bronze medal

=== European Championship ===
- 1989 – Won silver medal
- 1991 – Won silver medal
- 1993 – Won silver medal
- 1995 – Won silver medal
- 1996 – Won gold medal

=== 3/4 Nations Cup ===
- 2000 – Finished in 4th place
- 2001 – Won bronze medal (3 Nations Cup)
- 2002 – Finished in 4th place
- 2003 – Finished in 4th place
- 2004 – Won bronze medal
- 2005 – Finished in 4th place
- 2006 – Won bronze medal
- 2007 – Finished in 4th place
- 2008 – Won bronze medal
- 2009 – Won bronze medal
- 2010 – Finished in 4th place

== Team ==
=== Current roster ===
The roster for the 2026 IIHF Women's World Championship.

Head coach: Erika Holst

No.	Pos.	Name	Height	Weight	Birthdate	Team
1	G	Ebba Svensson Träff	1.66 m (5 ft 5 in)	70 kg (150 lb)	27 November 2004 (age 21)	(Sweden) Linköping HC
7	D	Mira Jungåker	1.73 m (5 ft 8 in)	70 kg (150 lb)	22 July 2005 (age 21)	(United States) Ohio State Buckeyes
8	F	Hilda Svensson	1.70 m (5 ft 7 in)	67 kg (148 lb)	24 August 2006 (age 20)	(United States) Ohio State Buckeyes
11	F	Josefin Bouveng	1.75 m (5 ft 9 in)	68 kg (150 lb)	15 May 2001 (age 25)	(United States) Vegas Vanguards
12	D	Maja Nylén-Persson	1.63 m (5 ft 4 in)	68 kg (150 lb)	20 November 2000 (age 25)	(United States) New York Sirens
13	F	Wilma Sundin	1.65 m (5 ft 5 in)	60 kg (130 lb)	24 September 2003 (age 23)	(Sweden) Brynäs IF
14	D	Ida Karlsson	1.78 m (5 ft 10 in)	68 kg (150 lb)	30 June 2004 (age 22)	(United States) Minnesota Duluth Bulldogs
15	F	Lisa Johansson	1.61 m (5 ft 3 in)	58 kg (128 lb)	11 April 1992 (age 34)	(Sweden) Frölunda HC
16	F	Tilde Grillfors	1.65 m (5 ft 5 in)	71 kg (157 lb)	3 July 2008 (age 18)	(Sweden) Brynäs IF
17	F	Sofie Lundin	1.64 m (5 ft 5 in)	63 kg (139 lb)	15 February 2000 (age 26)	(Sweden) Frölunda HC
19	F	Sara Hjalmarsson	1.76 m (5 ft 9 in)	77 kg (170 lb)	8 February 1998 (age 28)	(Canada) Toronto Sceptres
21	D	Lova Blom	1.69 m (5 ft 7 in)	75 kg (165 lb)	15 July 2003 (age 23)	(Sweden) Brynäs IF
22	F	Hanna Thuvik	1.70 m (5 ft 7 in)	75 kg (165 lb)	17 May 2002 (age 24)	(Sweden) Brynäs IF
23	F	Thea Johansson	1.71 m (5 ft 7 in)	68 kg (150 lb)	22 November 2002 (age 23)	(Sweden) HV71
24	F	Ebba Hedqvist	1.68 m (5 ft 6 in)	66 kg (146 lb)	30 September 2006 (age 20)	(Sweden) Luleå HF
25	F	Lina Ljungblom	1.67 m (5 ft 6 in)	79 kg (174 lb)	15 October 2001 (age 25)	(Canada) Montreal Victoire
30	G	Emma Söderberg	1.71 m (5 ft 7 in)	69 kg (152 lb)	18 February 1998 (age 28)	(Sweden) SDE HF
31	G	Ida Boman	1.69 m (5 ft 7 in)	58 kg (128 lb)	1 April 2003 (age 23)	(Sweden) Färjestad BK
34	F	Mira Hallin	1.67 m (5 ft 6 in)	61 kg (134 lb)	24 April 2006 (age 20)	(Sweden) MoDo Hockey
37	D	Josefine Holmgren	1.75 m (5 ft 9 in)	74 kg (163 lb)	4 November 1993 (age 33)	(Sweden) SDE HF
55	D	Jenna Raunio	1.74 m (5 ft 9 in)	70 kg (150 lb)	24 September 2006 (age 20)	(United States) Ohio State Buckeyes
67	F	Michelle Löwenhielm	1.73 m (5 ft 8 in)	73 kg (161 lb)	22 March 1995 (age 31)	(Sweden) Linköping HC
71	D	Anna Kjellbin – C	1.69 m (5 ft 7 in)	63 kg (139 lb)	16 March 1994 (age 32)	(Canada) Hamilton Havoc
89	F	Nicole Hall	1.68 m (5 ft 6 in)	73 kg (161 lb)	24 March 2004 (age 22)	(United States) Penn State Nittany Lions

=== Head coaches ===
- Christian Yngve, 1989–1996
- Bengt Ohlson, 1996–1998
- Christian Yngve, 1998–2001
- Peter Elander, 2003–2009
- Niclas Högberg, 2010–2013
- Leif Boork, 2014–2018
- Ylva Martinsen, 2018–2020
- Ulf Lundberg, 2020–2025
- Erika Holst, 2025–present

=== Notable players ===
- Gunilla Andersson
- Jenni Asserholt
- Emma Eliasson
- Erika Grahm
- Erika Holst
- Kim Martin Hasson
- Emma Nordin
- Maria Rooth
- Pernilla Winberg

== Player awards and honors ==
Event	Award	Player
2005 World Championship	All Star	Maria Rooth
2006 Winter Olympics	All Star	Kim Martin
2006 Winter Olympics	All Star	Maria Rooth

== See also ==
- Women's ice hockey in Sweden
