= Inese Geca-Miljone =

Latvian ice hockey player

- Born: March 3, 1978 (age 48) Rīga, Latvian SSR, Soviet Union
- Height: 172 cm (5 ft 8 in)
- Weight: 65 kg (143 lb; 10 st 3 lb)
- Position: Left Wing
- Shoots: Right
- OBWIC team: SHK Laima Rīga
- National team: Latvia
- Playing career: 1989–present

Inese Geca-Miljone (born March 3, 1978) is a Latvian ice hockey player, currently playing with SHK Laima Rīga. Geca-Miljone represented Latvian national team in fourteen IIHF Women's World Championships at the Division IA and IB levels. In 2017 she represented Latvian national team as an assistant coach.

Geca-Miljone and her daughter, Līga Miljone, made history as the first mother-daughter duo to play in the same IIHF World Women's Championship, first appearing together at the 2013 Division IA tournament, and again in 2014 and 2016. At the 2017 IIHF Women's World Championship they represented Latvia as coach and player.

== International play ==
Inese Geca-Miljone played her first International game in 1992 against Ukraine, which was the first ever game for Latvian national team. Inese Geca-Miljone and Latvian national team debuted in the 1999 Women's World Ice Hockey Championships (Lower Divisions) in Colmar, France and earned 5th place. Geca-Miljone posted 10 points (7+3) in her first IIHF tournament.

== Coaching career ==
Geca-Miljone was an assistant coach for Latvian national team in OGQ in 2016, and in 2017 IIHF Women's World Championship Division I. Latvian national team finished the IIHF 2017 tournament in third place and was recognized with bronze medals.

== Career statistics ==
=== International ===
Year	Team	Event	Result	GP	G	A	Pts
1999	Latvia	WWC	5th	5	7	3	10
2000	Latvia	WWC	6th	5	5	2	7
2001	Latvia	WWC	6th	4	2	2	4
2003	Latvia	WWC	5th	5	2	2	4
2004	Latvia	WWC	3rd place, bronze medalist(s)	5	5	0	5
2005	Latvia	WWC	6th	5	4	1	5
2005	Latvia	OGQ	DNQ	3	4	1	5
2007	Latvia	WWC	2nd place, silver medalist(s)	5	3	2	5
2008	Latvia	WWC	6th	5	4	1	5
2009	Latvia	WWC	1st place, gold medalist(s)	5	8	7	15
2009	Latvia	OGQ	DNQ	3	6	1	7
2011	Latvia	WWC	3rd place, bronze medalist(s)	4	2	2	4
2012	Latvia	WWC	5th	5	0	0	0
2013	Latvia	WWC	6th	5	0	1	1
2014	Latvia	WWC	1st place, gold medalist(s)	5	6	7	13
2014	Latvia	OGQ	DNQ	3	0	2	2
2016	Latvia	WWC	2nd place, silver medalist(s)	5	0	2	2
Senior totals				77	58	36	94
