= 2017 IIHF Women's World Championship Division II =

International ice hockey tournament

Tournament details
- Host countries: South Korea; Iceland; Taiwan
- Venue: 4 (in 3 host cities)
- Dates: 2–8 April 2017; 27 February – 5 March 2017; 12–17 December 2016
- Teams: 17

The 2017 IIHF Women's World Championship Division II consisted of three international ice hockey tournaments organized by the International Ice Hockey Federation. Division II A, Division II B and Division II B Qualification represent the fourth, fifth and sixth tier of the IIHF Women's World Championship.

At the 2017 IIHF annual congress it was decided that the Top Division would expand from eight to ten teams. As a result, all relegations from the 2017 tournaments were cancelled, and there would also be no relegation in all 2018 tournaments.

== Venues ==
Division II Group A	Division II Group B	Division II Group B Qualification
Gangneung	Akureyri	Taipei
Gangneung Hockey Centre; Capacity: 10,000; Kwandong Hockey Centre; Capacity: 6,000	Akureyri Ice Rink; Capacity: 1,000	Annex Ice Rink; Capacity: 1,000

== Division II Group A ==
2017 IIHF Women's World Championship Division II A
Tournament details
- Host country: South Korea
- City: Gangneung
- Venues: 2 (in 1 host city)
- Dates: 2–8 April 2017
- Teams: 6

Tournament statistics
- Games played: 15
- Goals scored: 84 (5.6 per game)
- Attendance: 20,611 (1,374 per game)
- Scoring leader: (United Kingdom) Angela Taylor (12 points)

The Division II Group A tournament was played in Gangneung, South Korea, from 2 to 8 April 2017.

=== Participating teams ===
Team	Qualification
Netherlands	Placed 6th in Division I B last year and were relegated.
South Korea	Hosts; placed 2nd in Division II A last year.
Great Britain	Placed 3rd in Division II A last year.
North Korea	Placed 4th in Division II A last year.
Slovenia	Placed 5th in Division II A last year.
Australia	Placed 1st in Division II B last year and were promoted.

=== Match officials ===
4 referees and 7 linesmen were selected for the tournament.

Referees

- (Canada) Vanessa Morin
- (Japan) Anna Kuroda
- (United States) Chelsea Rapin
- (Norway) Rita Rygh

Linesmen

- (Switzerland) Tanja Cadonau
- (Japan) Aiko Hoshi
- (Finland) Jenni Jaatinen
- (South Korea) Lee Kyung-sun
- (South Korea) Lee Tae-ri
- (Norway) Bente Owren
- (United States) Brienne Stewart

=== Final standings ===
Pos	Team	Pld	W	OTW	OTL	L	GF	GA	GD	Pts	Promotion
1	South Korea (H)	5	5	0	0	0	21	3	+18	15	Promoted to the 2018 Division I B
2	Netherlands	5	4	0	0	1	17	10	+7	12	
3	Great Britain	5	2	0	1	2	20	16	+4	7	
4	North Korea	5	1	1	0	3	10	13	−3	5	
5	Slovenia	5	1	0	0	4	9	22	−13	3 (Note: Slovenia 3–0 Australia)	
6	Australia	5	1	0	0	4	7	20	−13	3	

Source: IIHF
Rules for classification: 1) points; 2) head-to-head points; 3) head-to-head goal difference; 4) head-to-head number of goals scored; 5) result against closest best-ranked team outside tied teams; 6) result against second-best ranked team outside tied teams; 7) seeding before tournament.
(H) Host

=== Match results ===
All times are local (Time in South Korea – UTC+9).

2 April 2017; 12:00	Australia	2–1 (1–1, 0–0, 1–0)	North Korea	Gangneung Hockey Centre, Gangneung; Attendance: 1,923

Game reference

Michelle Coonan
Goalies
So Jong-sim
Referee:
(Japan) Anna Kuroda
Linesmen:
(South Korea) Lee Kyung-sun
(United States) Brienne Stewart

	0–1	07:52 – Kim Un-h. (Won)
Ayris (Godfrey) – 16:17	1–1
Crompton (Powell) – 48:56	2–1

14 min
Penalties
4 min
19
Shots
32

2 April 2017; 16:30	Great Britain	4–5 (0–1, 3–3, 1–1)	Netherlands	Catholic Kwandong University Gymnasium, Gangneung; Attendance: 409

Game reference

Nicole Jackson
Goalies
Bianka Bos
Referee:
(Canada) Vanessa Morin
Linesmen:
(Switzerland) Tanja Cadonau
(Finland) Jenni Jaatinen

	0–1	00:31 – Zwarthoed (Hamers)
	0–2	27:28 – Van Nes (Zwarthoed, Wielenga)
Marsden (Taylor, Henry) – 27:46	1–2
	1–3	31:14 – Hamers (Dijkema)
Marsden (Taylor, Traill) – 31:51	2–3
Ganney (Henry) – 35:08	3–3
	3–4	38:32 – Van Nes (Wielenga)
	3–5	46:46 – Huisman (Tjin–A–Ton)
Lane (Marsden, Summers) – 58:12	4–5

12 min
Penalties
10 min
12
Shots
43

2 April 2017; 21:00	South Korea	5–1 (1–1, 2–0, 2–0)	Slovenia	Catholic Kwandong University Gymnasium, Gangneung; Attendance: 1,096

Game reference

Han Do-hee
Goalies
Ines Confidenti
Referee:
(United States) Chelsea Rapin
Linesmen:
(Japan) Aiko Hoshi
(Norway) Bente Owren

Kim H. (Choi J.) – 04:36	1–0
	1–1	08:20 – E. Dukarič (S. Confidenti, Pren)
Jo (Eom) – 27:06	2–1
Choi J. (Park Yo.) (PP) – 31:24	3–1
Im (Griffin) – 47:32	4–1
Park J. (Park C.) – 49:09	5–1

10 min
Penalties
12 min
78
Shots
12

3 April 2017; 16:30	Netherlands	4–2 (1–0, 2–2, 1–0)	North Korea	Catholic Kwandong University Gymnasium, Gangneung; Attendance: 1,048

Game reference

Lisa Daams
Goalies
So Jong-sim
Referee:
(Norway) Rita Rygh
Linesmen:
(Switzerland) Tanja Cadonau
(South Korea) Lee Kyung-sun

Zwarthoed (Dijkema) – 08:47	1–0
	1–1	22:41 – Kim Un-h. (PS)
	1–2	28:28 – Kim H. (Jong) (PP)
Keijzer (Wielenga) – 31:21	2–2
Wielenga (Keijzer) (PP) – 38:59	3–2
Keijzer (Zwarthoed) (PP2) – 49:07	4–2

28 min
Penalties
14 min
31
Shots
19

3 April 2017; 21:00	Slovenia	3–0 (2–0, 1–0, 0–0)	Australia	Gangneung Hockey Centre, Gangneung; Attendance: 247

Game reference

Pia Dukarič
Goalies
Ashleigh Brown
Referee:
(Japan) Anna Kuroda
Linesmen:
(Japan) Aiko Hoshi
(Norway) Bente Owren

S. Confidenti (Zimšek, Pren) – 06:26	1–0
Pren (S. Confidenti) (SH) – 19:48	2–0
Pren (E. Dukarič) (SH) – 22:56	3–0

12 min
Penalties
10 min
19
Shots
45

3 April 2017; 21:00	South Korea	3–1 (2–0, 0–1, 1–0)	Great Britain	Gangneung Hockey Centre, Gangneung; Attendance: 1,228

Game reference

Han Do-hee
Goalies
Nicole Jackson
Referee:
(Canada) Vanessa Morin
Linesmen:
(Finland) Jenni Jaatinen
(United States) Brienne Stewart

Park J. – 15:55	1–0
Han (Park J.) – 19:56	2–0
	2–1	24:07 – Ganney (Lane)
Kim H. (Jo) – 54:43	3–1

6 min
Penalties
12 min
38
Shots
20

5 April 2017; 12:00	Netherlands	5–1 (2–1, 2–0, 1–0)	Slovenia	Catholic Kwandong University Gymnasium, Gangneung; Attendance: 851

Game reference

Bianka Bos
Goalies
Pia Dukarič
Referee:
(Japan) Anna Kuroda
Linesmen:
(Finland) Jenni Jaatinen
(South Korea) Lee Kyung-sun

	0–1	00:30 – Pren (S. Confidenti)
De Jong (Wielenga) – 06:26	1–1
Milders (Zwarthoed) – 18:38	2–1
Zwarthoed (Tjin-a-Ton, Even) – 31:45	3–1
Haverkorn (Zwarthoed, Milders) – 31:56	4–1
De Jong (Milders, Wielenga) (SH) – 50:37	5–1

8 min
Penalties
14 min
72
Shots
8

5 April 2017; 16:30	Great Britain	2–3 OT (0–0, 0–1, 2–1); OT: (0–1)	North Korea	Gangneung Hockey Centre, Gangneung; Attendance: 1,627

Game reference

Nicole Jackson
Goalies
So Jong-sim
Referee:
(United States) Chelsea Rapin
Linesmen:
(Japan) Aiko Hoshi
(United States) Brienne Stewart

	0–1	37:54 – Jong (Ryo, Hwang C.) (SH)
	0–2	42:07 – Won (Jin, Kim Un-h.) (PP)
Taylor (Traill, Mardsen) – 49:53	1–2
Ganney (Taylor, Lane) – 50:49	2–2
	2–3	61:59 – Jin (Won)

14 min
Penalties
8 min
35
Shots
30

5 April 2017; 21:00	South Korea	8–1 (2–0, 5–0, 1–1)	Australia	Catholic Kwandong University Gymnasium, Gangneung; Attendance: 1,042

Game reference

Han Do-hee
Goalies
Michelle Coonan
Ashleigh Brown
Referee:
(Norway) Rita Rygh
Linesmen:
(Switzerland) Tanja Cadonau
(Norway) Bente Owren

Park J. (Jo) – 05:02	1–0
Park Ye. (Choi J.) (PP) – 11:28	2–0
Han S. (Park J., Eom) (PP) – 20:52	3–0
Choi Y. (Im) – 24:41	4–0
Park J. (Park Ye., Eom) (PP) – 30:47	5–0
Lee E. (Park J., Eom) (PP) – 34:50	6–0
Eom (Han S.) (PP) – 39:59	7–0
	7–1	48:27 – Powell (Van der Wolf)
Choi Y – 59:43	8–1

0 min
Penalties
12 min
42
Shots
5

6 April 2017; 16:30	Slovenia	2–8 (0–4, 0–3, 2–1)	Great Britain	Catholic Kwandong University Gymnasium, Gangneung; Attendance: 396

Game reference

Pia Dukarič
Ines Confidenti
Goalies
Nicole Jackson
Michelle Franklin
Referee:
(Canada) Vanessa Morin
Linesmen:
(Switzerland) Tanja Cadonau
(Norway) Bente Owren

	0–1	09:47 – Ganney (Henry, Lane)
	0–2	12:24 – Mardsen (Hill, Taylor) (PP)
	0–3	14:09 – Allen (Taylor)
	0–4	16:57 – Mardsen (Taylor)
	0–5	20:16 – Henry (Farman, Lane) (PP)
	0–6	27:13 – Traill (Adams)
	0–7	30:01 – Henry (Taylor, Mardsen)
	0–8	43:09 – Farman (Allen)
S. Confidenti (Haus) – 47:03	1–8
Pren (Zimšek) – 58:48	2–8

10 min
Penalties
10 min
12
Shots
59

6 April 2017; 21:00	Australia	1–3 (0–2, 1–1, 0–0)	Netherlands	Catholic Kwandong University Gymnasium, Gangneung; Attendance: 367

Game reference

Ashleigh Brown
Goalies
Lisa Daams
Referee:
(Norway) Rita Rygh
Linesmen:
(Japan) Aiko Hoshi
(South Korea) Lee Kyung-sun

	0–1	06:44 – De Jong (Keijzer) (SH)
	0–2	09:00 – Hamers (Dijkema, Zwarthoed)
	0–3	34:15 – Tjin-A-Ton (Tegelaar, Huisman)
McOnie (Ayris) – 35:38	1–3

6 min
Penalties
8 min
17
Shots
26

6 April 2017; 21:00	North Korea	0–3 (0–2, 0–1, 0–0)	South Korea	Gangneung Hockey Centre, Gangneung; Attendance: 5,800

Game reference

So Jong-sim
Ri Pom
Goalies
Han Do-hee
Referee:
(United States) Chelsea Rapin
Linesmen:
(Finland) Jenni Jaatinen
(United States) Brienne Stewart

0–1	08:13 – Park Ye. (Park Yo., Griffin) (PP)
0–2	11:27 – Jo (Park Ye., Park Yo.) (PP)
0–3	37:57 – Lee E. (Park J., Kim S.)

10 min
Penalties
8 min
26
Shots
29

8 April 2017; 12:00	North Korea	4–2 (0–2, 2–0, 2–0)	Slovenia	Catholic Kwandong University Gymnasium, Gangneung; Attendance: 1,539

Game reference

Ri Pom
So Jong-sim
Goalies
Pia Dukarič
Referee:
(Japan) Anna Kuroda
Linesmen:
(Japan) Aiko Hoshi
(Finland) Jenni Jaatinen

	0–1	00:25 – E. Dukarič (S. Confidenti)
	0–2	07:34 – S. Confidenti (Lončar, Pren)
Kim K. (Ryo, Jong) – 26:41	1–2
Jong (Kim H.) – 34:23	2–2
Kim Un-j. (Choe U.) – 44:58	3–2
Kim K. – 58:14	4–2

2 min
Penalties
6 min
70
Shots
13

8 April 2017; 16:30	Netherlands	0–2 (0–0, 0–1, 0–1)	South Korea	Catholic Kwandong University Gymnasium, Gangneung; Attendance: 2,482

Game reference
Lisa Daams	Goalies	Shin So-jung	Referee: (Canada) Vanessa Morin; Linesmen: (Switzerland) Tanja Cadonau (United States) Brienne Stewart
0–1 / 36:04 – Han (Park J., Cho); 0–2 / 42:53 – Han (Park J., Lee E.) (PP)			Referee: (Canada) Vanessa Morin; Linesmen: (Switzerland) Tanja Cadonau (United States) Brienne Stewart
10 min	Penalties	2 min	Referee: (Canada) Vanessa Morin; Linesmen: (Switzerland) Tanja Cadonau (United States) Brienne Stewart
11	Shots	30	Referee: (Canada) Vanessa Morin; Linesmen: (Switzerland) Tanja Cadonau (United States) Brienne Stewart

8 April 2017; 21:00	Great Britain	5–3 (2–1, 1–2, 2–0)	Australia	Catholic Kwandong University Gymnasium, Gangneung; Attendance: 556

Game reference

Nicole Jackson
Goalies
Michelle Coonan
Referee:
(United States) Chelsea Rapin
Linesmen:
(South Korea) Lee Kyung-sun
(Norway) Bente Owren

Emery (Taylor) – 05:29	1–0
Taylor (Marsden) – 11:19	2–0
	2–1	19:30 – Godfrey (Van der Wolf)
	2–2	21:35 – Matheson (Parrington) (PP)
Marsden (Lewis) – 24:23	3–2
	3–3	28:54 Matheson (Costa, Van der Wolf) (PP)
Henry (Taylor, Hill) – 44:18	4–3
Taylor (Newman, Douglas) (PP) – 58:50	5–3

12 min
Penalties
14 min
26
Shots
20

=== Awards and statistics ===
==== Awards ====
- Best players selected by the directorate:
  - Best Goalkeeper: (South Korea) Han Do-hee
  - Best Defenseman: (Netherlands) Kayleigh Hamers
  - Best Forward: (Slovenia) Pia Pren

Source: IIHF.com

==== Scoring leaders ====
List shows the top skaters sorted by points, then goals.

Player	GP	G	A	Pts	+/−	PIM	POS
(United Kingdom) Angela Taylor	5	3	9	12	+8	2	F
(South Korea) Park Jong-ah	5	4	6	10	+5	0	F
(United Kingdom) Kathryn Marsden	5	5	4	9	+7	4	F
(Slovenia) Pia Pren	5	4	4	8	–1	4	F
(Netherlands) Julie Zwarthoed	5	3	5	8	+7	2	F
(Slovenia) Sara Confidenti	5	3	4	7	+1	6	F
(United Kingdom) Katie Henry	5	3	3	6	+3	10	F
(Netherlands) Savine Wielenga	5	1	5	6	+5	0	F
(South Korea) Han Soo-jin	5	4	1	5	+4	2	F
(South Korea) Jo Su-sie	5	2	3	5	+3	0	F

GP = Games played; G = Goals; A = Assists; Pts = Points; +/− = Plus/minus; PIM = Penalties in minutes; POS = Position
Source: IIHF.com

==== Goaltending leaders ====
Only the top five goaltenders, based on save percentage, who have played at least 40% of their team's minutes, are included in this list.

Player	TOI	GA	GAA	SA	Sv%	SO
(South Korea) Han Do-hee	240:00	3	0.75	63	95.24	1
(Slovenia) Pia Dukarič	201:01	16	4.57	221	92.76	1
(Netherlands) Lisa Daams	180:00	5	1.67	66	92.42	0
(North Korea) So Jong-sim	252:49	11	2.61	110	90.00	0
(United Kingdom) Nicole Jackson	291:16	15	3.09	140	89.29	0

TOI = Time on Ice (minutes:seconds); SA = Shots against; GA = Goals against; GAA = Goals against average; Sv% = Save percentage; SO = Shutouts
Source: IIHF.com

== Division II Group B ==
2017 IIHF Women's World Championship Division II B
Tournament details
- Host country: Iceland
- City: Akureyri
- Venues: 2 (in 1 host city)
- Dates: 27 February – 5 March 2017
- Teams: 6

Tournament statistics
- Games played: 15
- Goals scored: 109 (7.27 per game)
- Attendance: 3,429 (229 per game)
- Scoring leader: (New Zealand) Anjali Thakker (15 points)

The Division II Group B tournament was played in Akureyri, Iceland, from 27 February to 5 March 2017.

=== Participating teams ===
Team	Qualification
Spain	Placed 2nd in Division II B last year.
Iceland	Hosts; placed 3rd in Division II B last year.
Mexico	Placed 4th in Division II B last year.
New Zealand	Placed 5th in Division II B last year.
Romania	Placed 1st in Division II B Qualification last year and were promoted.
Turkey	Placed 6th in Division II B last year but were allowed to remain because of Croatia's withdrawal.

=== Match officials ===
4 referees and 7 linesmen were selected for the tournament.

Referees

- (Hungary) Katalin Gérnyi
- (Russia) Elena Ivanova
- (Finland) Henna-Maria Koivuluoma
- (Czech Republic) Gabriela Malá

Linesmen

- (Czech Republic) Veronika Dopitová
- (Sweden) Linn Forsberg
- (United Kingdom) Leigh Hetherington
- (Netherlands) Senovwa Mollen
- (Kazakhstan) Oksana Shestakova
- (Germany) Julia Tschirner
- (Austria) Julia Weegh

=== Final standings ===
Pos	Team	Pld	W	OTW	OTL	L	GF	GA	GD	Pts	Promotion
1	Mexico	5	4	0	0	1	19	9	+10	12	Promoted to the 2018 Division II A
2	Spain	5	3	1	0	1	26	7	+19	11	
3	New Zealand	5	3	0	1	1	20	13	+7	10	
4	Iceland (H)	5	2	0	0	3	19	13	+6	6 (Note: Iceland 6–0 Turkey)	
5	Turkey	5	2	0	0	3	15	31	−16	6	
6	Romania	5	0	0	0	5	10	36	−26	0	

Source: IIHF
Rules for classification: 1) points; 2) head-to-head points; 3) head-to-head goal difference; 4) head-to-head number of goals scored; 5) result against closest best-ranked team outside tied teams; 6) result against second-best ranked team outside tied teams; 7) seeding before tournament.
(H) Host

=== Match results ===
All times are local (Greenwich Mean Time – UTC±0).

27 February 2017; 13:00	Turkey	3–5 (1–3, 1–2, 1–0)	New Zealand	Akureyri Ice Rink, Akureyri; Attendance: 164

Game reference

Kübra Dadaşoğlu
Goalies
Lochlyn Hyde
Referee:
(Czech Republic) Gabriela Malá
Linesmen:
(Czech Republic) Veronika Dopitová
(Austria) Julia Weegh

Tayğar (Baktıroğlu) – 04:46	1–0
	1–1	08:21 – Murray (Thakker)
	1–2	16:37 – Thakker (Neville-Lamb, Murray) (PP)
	1–3	19:23 – Thakker (Goulding) (SH)
	1–4	21:44 – Thakker (SH)
	1–5	28:23 – Davis (A. Hyde)
Baktıroğlu (Demirkol) (PP) – 38:06	2–5
Yurt (Tayğar, Baktıroğlu) (EA) – 58:48	3–5

20 min
Penalties
14 min
16
Shots
39

27 February 2017; 16:30	Mexico	3–1 (2–0, 0–1, 1–0)	Spain	Akureyri Ice Rink, Akureyri; Attendance: 280

Game reference

Mónica Renteria
Goalies
Alba Gonzalo
Referee:
(Finland) Henna-Maria Koivuluoma
Linesmen:
(Sweden) Linn Forsberg
(United Kingdom) Leigh Hetherington

Chávez (Cruz, Tellez) (PP) – 01:30	1–0
Chávez (Tellez) (PP2) – 14:54	2–0
	2–1	34:18 – A. Merino
Escobedo (PP) – 54:38	3–1

12 min
Penalties
18 min
17
Shots
24

27 February 2017; 20:00	Iceland	7–2 (3–0, 1–0, 3–2)	Romania	Akureyri Ice Rink, Akureyri; Attendance: 420

Game reference

Elise Väljaots
Goalies
Andreea Herescu
Referee:
(Hungary) Katalin Gérnyi
Linesmen:
(Netherlands) Senovwa Mollen
(Germany) Julia Tschirner

Jóhannesdóttir (Baldursdóttir) – 05:49	1–0
Su. Björgvinsdóttir (Viðarsdóttir) (PP) – 06:17	2–0
Si. Björgvinsdóttir (SH) – 15:57	3–0
Si. Björgvinsdóttir (Guðbjartsdóttir) – 29:36	4–0
	4–1	42:01 – Oprea (Balló)
Karvelsdóttir (Ingadóttir, Guðbjartsdóttir) (PP) – 44:59	5–1
Þórisdóttir (D. Björgvinsdóttir) – 49:51	6–1
	6–2	52:05 – Popescu (Voicu)
Baldursdóttir (Jóhannesdóttir, Ágústsdóttir) (PP) – 59:35	7–2

12 min
Penalties
18 min
51
Shots
22

28 February 2017; 13:00	Spain	3–2 OT (2–2, 0–0, 0–0) (OT 1–0)	New Zealand	Akureyri Ice Rink, Akureyri; Attendance: 100

Game reference

Alba Gonzalo
Goalies
Lochlyn Hyde
Referee:
(Russia) Elena Ivanova
Linesmen:
(Sweden) Linn Forsberg
(Austria) Julia Weegh

	0–1	14:26 – Goulding (Davis, A. Hyde) (PP)
	0–2	14:57 – Shields (Murray, Thakker)
S. Danielsson (L. Danielsson) – 15:50	1–2
Rivera (Muñoz, Álvarez) (PP) – 19:32	2–2
A. Merino – 62:26	3–2

27 min
Penalties
12 min
29
Shots
25

28 February 2017; 16:30	Romania	4–6 (2–3, 1–2, 1–1)	Turkey	Akureyri Ice Rink, Akureyri; Attendance: 80

Game reference

Andreea Herescu
Goalies
Kübra Dadaşoğlu
Referee:
(Finland) Henna-Maria Koivuluoma
Linesmen:
(Czech Republic) Veronika Dopitová
(Germany) Julia Tschirner

	0–1	00:40 – Baktıroğlu
	0–2	03:06 – Baktıroğlu (Yılmaz)
Balló – 04:23	1–2
Voicu (Popescu) (PP) – 12:35	2–2
	2–3	18:15 – Yurt
Voicu (Barta) (PP) – 20:15	3–3
	3–4	22:29 – Baktıroğlu
	3–5	38:24 – Baktıroğlu (SH)
	3–6	54:11 – Demirkol (Baktıroğlu)
Popescu – 59:17	4–6

12 min
Penalties
6 min
33
Shots
42

28 February 2017; 20:00	Iceland	2–4 (1–1, 1–1, 0–2)	Mexico	Akureyri Ice Rink, Akureyri; Attendance: 350

Game reference

Elise Väljaots
Goalies
Mónica Renteria
Referee:
(Czech Republic) Gabriela Malá
Linesmen:
(United Kingdom) Leigh Hetherington
(Kazakhstan) Oksana Shestakova

	0–1	15:04 – Tellez (Ayala)
Su. Björgvinsdóttir (Si. Björgvinsdóttir) (PP) – 15:10	1–1
	1–2	21:38 – Cruz
Su. Björgvinsdóttir (Karvelsdottir) (PP) – 39:22	2–2
	2–3	56:09 – Tellez
	2–4	59:04 – Chávez (ENG)

8 min
Penalties
4 min
30
Shots
23

2 March 2017; 13:00	Spain	8–1 (1–1, 1–0, 6–0)	Romania	Akureyri Ice Rink, Akureyri; Attendance: 60

Game reference

Alba Gonzalo
Goalies
Andrea Kurko
Referee:
(Czech Republic) Gabriela Malá
Linesmen:
(Czech Republic) Veronika Dopitová
(United Kingdom) Leigh Hetherington

	0–1	09:40 – Voicu (Popescu)
Villar (Rivera, A. Merino) – 11:27	1–1
Muñoz (S. Danielsson, L. Danielsson) – 37:15	2–1
Sans (P. Merino) – 44:09	3–1
S. Danielsson (L. Danielsson) – 46:21	4–1
Muñoz – 46:53	5–1
A. Merino – 47:12	6–1
A. Merino (Senac Gómez, Villar) (PP) – 47:55	7–1
Sans (Rivera) – 54:12	8–1

4 min
Penalties
12 min
50
Shots
16

2 March 2017; 16:30	Mexico	1–0 (0–0, 1–0, 0–0)	New Zealand	Akureyri Ice Rink, Akureyri; Attendance: 95

Game reference
Mónica Renteria	Goalies	Lochlyn Hyde	Referee: (Hungary) Katalin Gérnyi; Linesmen: (Sweden) Linn Forsberg (Germany) Julia Tschirner
G. Rojas (Cárdenas) – 34:56 / 1–0			Referee: (Hungary) Katalin Gérnyi; Linesmen: (Sweden) Linn Forsberg (Germany) Julia Tschirner
6 min	Penalties	8 min	Referee: (Hungary) Katalin Gérnyi; Linesmen: (Sweden) Linn Forsberg (Germany) Julia Tschirner
15	Shots	28	Referee: (Hungary) Katalin Gérnyi; Linesmen: (Sweden) Linn Forsberg (Germany) Julia Tschirner

2 March 2017; 20:00	Iceland	6–0 (4–0, 0–0, 2–0)	Turkey	Akureyri Ice Rink, Akureyri; Attendance: 470

Game reference

Guðlaug Þorsteinsdóttir
Goalies
Kübra Dadaşoğlu
İrem Kırant
Referee:
(Russia) Elena Ivanova
Linesmen:
(Netherlands) Senovwa Mollen
(Austria) Julia Weegh

Su. Björgvinsdóttir (Karvelsdóttir, Viðarsdóttir) – 04:53	1–0
Jóhannesdóttir (Ágústsdóttir, Viðarsdóttir) (PP2) – 09:17	2–0
Geirsdóttir (Ágústsdóttir, Viðarsdóttir) (PP) – 15:55	3–0
Jóhannesdóttir (Sveinsdóttir) – 19:40	4–0
Karvelsdóttir (Ágústsdóttir, Jóhannesdóttir) (PP) – 49:36	5–0
Jóhannesdóttir (Sveinsdóttir) – 59:56	6–0

8 min
Penalties
10 min
53
Shots
17

3 March 2017; 13:00	Romania	0–6 (0–3, 0–1, 0–2)	Mexico	Akureyri Ice Rink, Akureyri; Attendance: 21

Game reference

Andrea Kurko
Goalies
María Meza
Referee:
(Hungary) Katalin Gérnyi
Linesmen:
(Kazakhstan) Oksana Shestakova
(Germany) Julia Tschirner

0–1	05:00 – Tellez (Cárdenas)
0–2	12:17 – Chávez (G. Rojas, Tellez)
0–3	18:21 – Cárdenas (Aravena, Meza)
0–4	32:16 – G. Rojas
0–5	54:54 – J. Rojas (Chávez)
0–6	57:37 – Tellez

2 min
Penalties
2 min
20
Shots
50

3 March 2017; 16:30	Turkey	0–11 (0–2, 0–5, 0–4)	Spain	Akureyri Ice Rink, Akureyri; Attendance: 34

Game reference

Kübra Dadaşoğlu
İrem Kırant
Goalies
Alba Gonzalo
Ester García
Referee:
(Russia) Elena Ivanova
Linesmen:
(United Kingdom) Leigh Hetherington
(Netherlands) Senovwa Mollen

0–1	08:30 – S. Danielsson (Muñoz)
0–2	19:18 – Muñoz
0–3	21:28 – Grande (Senac Gómez)
0–4	25:55 – A. Merino (Muñoz, S. Danielsson) (PP)
0–5	31:36 – A. Merino (Ortiz) (SH)
0–6	35:36 – L. Danielsson (Muñoz, S. Danielsson)
0–7	38:08 – Hernández (Ayala, Rivera)
0–8	46:07 – S. Danielsson (Muñoz, L. Danielsson)
0–9	53:33 – Hernández (Rivera)
0–10	57:24 – Ortega (Grande)
0–11	57:42 – Rivera (Ayala)

12 min
Penalties
6 min
19
Shots
69

3 March 2017; 20:00	New Zealand	4–3 (1–0, 1–3, 2–0)	Iceland	Akureyri Ice Rink, Akureyri; Attendance: 578

Game reference

Lochlyn Hyde
Goalies
Elise Väljaots
Referee:
(Finland) Henna-Maria Koivuluoma
Linesmen:
(Czech Republic) Veronika Dopitová
(Sweden) Linn Forsberg

Thakker (Jensen) – 05:17	1–0
	1–1	20:41 – Jóhannesdóttir (Karvelsdóttir)
	1–2	26:19 – Jóhannesdóttir (Su. Björgvinsdóttir) (SH)
	1–3	29:15 – Si. Björgvinsdóttir (Su. Björgvinsdóttir)
Neville-Lamb (Thakker) – 30:40	2–3
Murray (Shields) – 53:34	3–3
Gregory (Thakker, Goulding) – 56:18	4–3

4 min
Penalties
8 min
28
Shots
31

5 March 2017; 13:00	Mexico	5–6 (2–0, 3–4, 0–2)	Turkey	Akureyri Ice Rink, Akureyri; Attendance: 52

Game reference

María Meza
Goalies
Kübra Dadaşoğlu
Referee:
(Russia) Elena Ivanova
Linesmen:
(Kazakhstan) Oksana Shestakova
(Austria) Julia Weegh

J. Rojas (Chávez) – 12:00	1–0
Cárdenas (G. Rojas, Tellez) – 17:37	2–0
	2–1	21:05 – Yılmaz (Baktıroğlu, Eryılmaz)
Chávez (J. Rojas) – 21:28	3–1
	3–2	22:29 – Lökbaş (Tayğar)
J. Rojas (Chávez) – 24:08	4–2
	4–3	25:00 – Yılmaz (Baktıroğlu)
	4–4	37:15 – Baktıroğlu (Demirkol)
J. Rojas (Chávez) – 38:36	5–4
	5–5	47:03 – Baktıroğlu
	5–6	59:17 – Demirkol (Baktıroğlu)

6 min
Penalties
8 min
52
Shots
26

5 March 2017; 16:30	New Zealand	9–3 (1–0, 4–3, 4–0)	Romania	Akureyri Ice Rink, Akureyri; Attendance: 43

Game reference

Lochlyn Hyde
Tabitha Crump
Goalies
Andrea Kurko
Referee:
(Hungary) Katalin Gérnyi
Linesmen:
(Sweden) Linn Forsberg
(Netherlands) Senovwa Mollen

Jensen (Thakker, Keenan) – 04:07	1–0
Heale (Thakker) – 22:02	2–0
Thakker (Heale) – 24:48	3–0
Heale (Thakker) – 33:40	4–0
	4–1	35:04 – Bíró (Voicu, Popescu)
Heale (Thakker) – 36:48	5–1
	5–2	36:55 – Voicu (Popescu)
	5–3	37:12 – Voicu (Balló)
Thakker – 51:55	6–3
Davis (Murray, Goulding) – 54:39	7–3
Goulding (Kloss) – 58:12	8–3
Thakker (Murray) – 59:37	9–3

2 min
Penalties
6 min
76
Shots
21

5 March 2017; 20:00	Spain	3–1 (2–0, 1–0, 0–1)	Iceland	Akureyri Ice Rink, Akureyri; Attendance: 682

Game reference

Alba Gonzalo
Goalies
Elise Väljaots
Guðlaug Þorsteinsdóttir
Referee:
(Finland) Henna-Maria Koivuluoma
Linesmen:
(United Kingdom) Leigh Hetherington
(Germany) Julia Tschirner

L. Abrisqueta (Rivera) – 01:55	1–0
V. Abrisqueta (L. Abrisqueta, Villar) – 13:29	2–0
Rivera (Hernández, L. Abrisqueta) – 22:26	3–0
	3–1	50:45 – Karvelsdóttir (Su. Björgvinsdóttir, Geirsdóttir) (PP)

14 min
Penalties
24 min
42
Shots
26

=== Awards and statistics ===
==== Awards ====
- Best players selected by the directorate:
  - Best Goalkeeper: (Mexico) Mónica Renteria
  - Best Defenseman: (Iceland) Eva Karvelsdóttir
  - Best Forward: (New Zealand) Anjali Thakker

Source: IIHF.com

==== Scoring leaders ====
List shows the top skaters sorted by points, then goals.

Player	GP	G	A	Pts	+/−	PIM	POS
(New Zealand) Anjali Thakker	5	7	8	15	+9	2	F
(Turkey) Çağla Baktıroğlu	5	7	6	13	+1	0	F
(Mexico) María Chávez	5	5	4	9	+4	4	F
(Iceland) Flosrún Jóhannesdóttir	5	6	2	8	+1	6	F
(Mexico) Claudia Tellez	5	4	4	8	+6	4	F
(Spain) Vega Muñoz	5	3	5	8	+7	6	F
(Spain) Carmen Rivera	5	3	5	8	+7	2	F
(Spain) Ainhoa Merino	5	6	1	7	+7	4	F
(Romania) Voicu Ana	5	5	2	7	−4	14	F
(Iceland) Sunna Björgvinsdóttir	5	4	3	7	+4	4	F
(Spain) Sara Danielsson	5	4	3	7	+9	6	F

GP = Games played; G = Goals; A = Assists; Pts = Points; +/− = Plus/minus; PIM = Penalties in minutes; POS = Position
Source: IIHF.com

==== Leading goaltenders ====
Only the top five goaltenders, based on save percentage, who have played at least 40% of their team's minutes, are included in this list.

Player	TOI	GA	GAA	SA	Sv%	SO
(Mexico) Mónica Renteria	180:00	3	1.00	82	96.34	1
(Spain) Alba Gonzalo	282:26	7	1.49	100	93.00	0
(New Zealand) Lochlyn Hyde	297:47	13	2.62	117	88.89	0
(Turkey) Kübra Dadaşoğlu	290:55	28	5.77	239	88.28	0
(Iceland) Elise Väljaots	199:45	12	3.60	94	87.23	0

TOI = Time on Ice (minutes:seconds); SA = Shots against; GA = Goals against; GAA = Goals against average; Sv% = Save percentage; SO = Shutouts
Source: IIHF.com

== Division II Group B Qualification ==
2017 IIHF Women's World Championship Division II B Qualification
Tournament details
- Host country: Taiwan
- City: Taipei
- Venue: 1 (in 1 host city)
- Dates: 12–17 December 2016
- Teams: 5

Tournament statistics
- Games played: 10
- Goals scored: 85 (8.5 per game)
- Attendance: 4,869 (487 per game)
- Scoring leader: (Chinese Taipei) Yeh Hui-chen (15 points)

The Division II Group B Qualification tournament was played in Taipei, Taiwan, from 12 to 17 December 2016.

=== Participating teams ===
Team	Qualification
Hong Kong	Placed 2nd in Division II B Qualification last year.
South Africa	Placed 3rd in Division II B Qualification last year.
Bulgaria	Placed 4th in Division II B Qualification last year.
Belgium	Did not participate last year; they last participated in 2015.
Chinese Taipei	Hosts; first participation in World Championships.

=== Match officials ===
3 referees and 5 linesmen were selected for the tournament.

Referees

- (South Korea) Ma Sang-hee
- (Japan) Etsuko Wada
- (United States) Laura White

Linesmen

- (Japan) Sayaka Akama
- (New Zealand) Ashleigh Davidson
- (Canada) Elizabeth Mantha
- (Czech Republic) Theodore Streitu
- (Japan) Yuka Tochigi

=== Final standings ===
Pos	Team	Pld	W	OTW	OTL	L	GF	GA	GD	Pts	Promotion
1	Chinese Taipei (H)	4	4	0	0	0	32	3	+29	12	Promoted to the 2018 Division II B
2	Belgium	4	3	0	0	1	22	3	+19	9	
3	South Africa	4	2	0	0	2	22	15	+7	6	
4	Bulgaria	4	1	0	0	3	6	32	−26	3	
5	Hong Kong	4	0	0	0	4	3	32	−29	0	

Source: IIHF
Rules for classification: 1) points; 2) head-to-head points; 3) head-to-head goal difference; 4) head-to-head number of goals scored; 5) result against closest best-ranked team outside tied teams; 6) result against second-best ranked team outside tied teams; 7) seeding before tournament.
(H) Host

=== Match results ===
All times are local (Time in Taiwan – UTC+8).

12 December 2016; 15:30	Belgium	8–1 (3–0, 3–0, 2–1)	South Africa	Annex Ice Rink, Taipei; Attendance: 297

Game reference

Nina van Orshaegan
Goalies
Danielle Kotze
Shaylene Swanepoel
Referee:
(South Korea) Ma Sang-hee
Linesmen:
(New Zealand) Ashleigh Davidson
(Canada) Elizabeth Mantha

Frere (Jenaer) – 02:31	1–0
Morel de Westgaver – 10:39	2–0
De Decker (Van Calster) – 13:00	3–0
De Decker (Liesens) – 24:38	4–0
L. Bosmans (Jenaer) – 25:42	5–0
De Wolf – 32:32	6–0
De Wolf – 42:09	7–0
	7–1	56:03 – Rhode (Van Doesburgh)
Maka – 59:43	8–1

4 min
Penalties
2 min
51
Shots
34

12 December 2016; 19:00	Chinese Taipei	13–0 (4–0, 5–0, 4–0)	Bulgaria	Annex Ice Rink, Taipei; Attendance: 612

Game reference

Wang Yun-tzu
Goalies
Paulina Georgieva
Katrin Stankova
Referee:
(United States) Laura White
Linesmen:
(Japan) Sayaka Akama
(Czech Republic) Theodore Šteitů

Hsu Ti. (Pan, Yeh) – 06:50	1–0
Teng (Hsieh) – 08:59	2–0
Teng (Hsu Ti., Huang M.) (PP) – 16:18	3–0
Yeh – 17:04	4–0
Teng (Liu A.) – 27:39	5–0
Liu C. – 27:51	6–0
Yeh (Sheng) – 28:18	7–0
Yeh (Liu C., Hsu Ti.) (PP2) – 37:12	8–0
Liu C. – 39:31	9–0
Yeh (Teng, Huang M.) – 42:51	10–0
Hsu Ti. (Yeh, Liu C.) (PP) – 48:36	11–0
Lin (Sheng) – 49:28	12–0
Lan (Tao, Yao) – 55:48	13–0

0 min
Penalties
20 min
74
Shots
10

13 December 2016; 15:30	Hong Kong	0–7 (0–1, 0–4, 0–2)	Belgium	Annex Ice Rink, Taipei; Attendance: 352

Game reference

Virginia Wong
Chau Nga-sze
Goalies
Maud Smits
Nina van Orshaegen
Referee:
(Japan) Etsuko Wada
Linesmen:
(New Zealand) Ashleigh Davidson
(Czech Republic) Theodore Šteitů

0–1	08:32 – De Decker (Van Calster)
0–2	23:52 – F. Bosmans (Frere)
0–3	28:40 – Morel de Westgaver (F. Bosmans)
0–4	36:59 – Van Calster (Morel de Westgaver) (SH)
0–5	38:16 – L. Bosmans
0–6	43:14 – Willemot (PP)
0–7	53:43 – Frere (Van Calster, F. Bosmans) (PP)

10 min
Penalties
12 min
8
Shots
87

13 December 2016; 19:00	South Africa	1–7 (0–2, 0–4, 1–1)	Chinese Taipei	Annex Ice Rink, Taipei; Attendance: 479

Game reference

Danielle Kotze
Shaylene Swanepoel
Goalies
Hsu Tzu-ting
Referee:
(South Korea) Ma Sang-hee
Linesmen:
(Canada) Elizabeth Mantha
(Japan) Yuka Tochigi

	0–1	09:19 – Yeh (Hsu Ti.)
	0–2	16:46 – Yao
	0–3	22:06 – Yao
	0–4	26:08 – Yeh (Pan)
	0–5	33:52 – Yeh (Hsu Ti., Teng) (PP)
	0–6	38:44 – Yeh (Pan, Huang M.) (PP)
Van Doesburgh – 47:44	1–6
	1–7	58:03 – Yeh (Hsu Ti.)

12 min
Penalties
2 min
20
Shots
41

15 December 2016; 15:30	South Africa	11–0 (3–0, 3–0, 5–0)	Bulgaria	Annex Ice Rink, Taipei; Attendance: 238

Game reference

Danielle Kotze
Goalies
Paulina Georgieva
Katrin Stankova
Referee:
(United States) Laura White
Linesmen:
(Japan) Sayaka Akama
(Japan) Yuka Tochigi

Roos (Keuler, Verwey) – 03:42	1–0
Jamieson (Roos, Van Doesburgh) – 13:16	2–0
Rhode (C. Schuurman, Ketola) – 14:33	3–0
C. Schuurman (D. Verwey) – 23:55	4–0
Sheffield (Jamieson, Roos) – 31:33	5–0
N. Schuurman (C. Schuurman, Skinner) – 35:12	6–0
N. Schuurman (Skinner, C. Schuurman) – 42:43	7–0
C. Schuurman (SH) – 48:16	8–0
Skinner (C. Schuurman) (PP) – 56:43	9–0
Van Doesburgh – 57:47	10–0
Grobler (Skinner, Van Doesburgh) – 59:59	11–0

8 min
Penalties
8 min
67
Shots
16

15 December 2016; 19:00	Chinese Taipei	10–1 (3–1, 4–0, 3–0)	Hong Kong	Annex Ice Rink, Taipei; Attendance: 635

Game reference

Wang Yun-tzu
Goalies
Chau Nga-sze
Virginia Wong
Referee:
(Japan) Etsuko Wada
Linesmen:
(Canada) Elizabeth Mantha
(Czech Republic) Theodore Streitu

Liu C. (Pan) – 02:09	1–0
Huang Y. (Lin, Sheng) – 03:40	2–0
Yeh (Huang M.) (PP) – 05:36	3–0
	3–1	11:06 – Leung (Li, Lau) (PP)
Liu A. – 20:19	4–1
Teng (Hsieh, Liu A.) – 25:23	5–1
Hsu Ti. (Liu C., Yeh) (PP) – 31:16	6–1
Teng (Liu A.) – 38:03	7–1
Hsu Ti. (Teng, Huang M.) (PP) – 42:06	8–1
Yeh (Huang M.) (SH) – 54:05	9–1
Tao (Huang M., Yao) (PP) – 57:28	10–1

10 min
Penalties
10 min
76
Shots
9

16 December 2016; 15:30	Bulgaria	0–6 (0–0, 0–3, 0–3)	Belgium	Annex Ice Rink, Taipei; Attendance: 382

Game reference

Paulina Georgieva
Goalies
Nina van Orshaegen
Maud Smits
Referee:
(South Korea) Ma Sang-hee
Linesmen:
(Czech Republic) Theodore Streitu
(Japan) Yuka Tochigi

0–1	22:02 – De Decker (L. Bosmans, Jenaer)
0–2	25:37 – L. Bosmans (De Decker)
0–3	36:10 – Maka (Clincke)
0–4	43:55 – Clincke (Boon)
0–5	52:51 – Morel de Westgaver (Frere)
0–6	59:08 – Duchateau

6 min
Penalties
10 min
8
Shots
57

16 December 2016; 19:00	Hong Kong	0–9 (0–4, 0–3, 0–2)	South Africa	Annex Ice Rink, Taipei; Attendance: 577

Game reference

Virginia Wong
Chau Nga-sze
Goalies
Shaylene Swanepoel
Referee:
(United States) Laura White
Linesmen:
(Japan) Sayaka Akama
(New Zealand) Ashleigh Davidson

0–1	13:01 – N. Schuurman (Skinner)
0–2	16:06 – Verwey
0–3	17:14 – C. Schuurman (N. Schuurman, Van Doesburgh)
0–4	19:24 – Van Doesburgh (N. Schuurman) (PP)
0–5	27:44 – Gruber (N. Schuurman)
0–6	28:40 – Roos (Van Doesburgh)
0–7	32:59 – Rhode (Skinner) (PP)
0–8	44:11 – C. Schuurman (Skinner, N. Schuurman) (PP)
0–9	54:50 – C. Schuurman (Verwey)

12 min
Penalties
6 min
3
Shots
63

17 December 2016; 15:30	Bulgaria	6–2 (0–1, 4–1, 2–0)	Hong Kong	Annex Ice Rink, Taipei; Attendance: 485

Game reference

Paulina Georgieva
Goalies
Virginia Wong
Chau Nga-sze
Referee:
(Japan) Etsuko Wada
Linesmen:
(Japan) Sayaka Akama
(New Zealand) Ashleigh Davidson

	0–1	05:19 – Li
Lisichkova (SH) – 22:11	1–1
Zareva – 25:07	2–1
Monova (Zareva) – 28:57	3–1
Koleva (PP) – 32:28	4–1
	4–2	39:18 – Leung (Low)
Lisichkova (SH2) – 47:22	5–2
Todorova (Lisichkova) – 53:59	6–2

18 min
Penalties
6 min
34
Shots
27

17 December 2016; 19:00	Belgium	1–2 (0–0, 1–2, 0–0)	Chinese Taipei	Annex Ice Rink, Taipei; Attendance: 812

Game reference

Nina van Orshaegan
Goalies
Hsu Tzu-ting
Referee:
(United States) Laura White
Linesmen:
(Canada) Elizabeth Mantha
(Japan) Yuka Tochigi

Frere (Morel de Westgaver, F. Bosmans) – 20:23	1–0
	1–1	34:34 – Liu C. (Huang M., Hsu Ti.) (PP)
	1–2	36:38 – Liu C. (Pan, Yeh) (PP)

16 min
Penalties
8 min
34
Shots
38

=== Awards and statistics ===
==== Awards ====
- Best players selected by the directorate:
  - Best Goalkeeper: (Belgium) Nina van Orshaegen
  - Best Defenseman: (South Africa) Donne van Doesburgh
  - Best Forward: (Chinese Taipei) Yeh Hui-chen

Source: IIHF.com

==== Scoring leaders ====
List shows the top skaters sorted by points, then goals.

Player	GP	G	A	Pts	+/−	PIM	POS
(Chinese Taipei) Yeh Hui-chen	4	11	4	15	+8	0	F
(Chinese Taipei) Hsu Ting-yu	4	4	6	10	+8	0	F
(South Africa) Chloe Schuurman	4	5	4	9	+8	0	F
(Chinese Taipei) Liu Chih-lin	4	5	3	8	+11	0	D
(Chinese Taipei) Teng Yu-ting	4	5	3	8	+5	2	F
(South Africa) Donne van Doesburgh	4	3	5	8	+5	2	D
(Chinese Taipei) Huang Min-chuan	4	0	8	8	+6	0	D
(South Africa) Nicole Schuurman	4	3	4	7	+1	2	F
(South Africa) Jessica Skinner	4	1	6	7	+4	0	F
(Belgium) Leen de Decker	4	4	1	5	+8	2	F

GP = Games played; G = Goals; A = Assists; Pts = Points; +/− = Plus/minus; PIM = Penalties in minutes; POS = Position
Source: IIHF.com

==== Leading goaltenders ====
Only the top five goaltenders, based on save percentage, who have played at least 40% of their team's minutes, are included in this list.

Player	TOI	GA	GAA	SA	Sv%	SO
(Chinese Taipei) Hsu Tzu-ting	120:00	2	1.00	54	96.30	0
(Belgium) Nina van Orshaegen	179:49	3	1.00	81	96.30	0
(Chinese Taipei) Wang Yun-tzu	120:00	1	0.50	19	94.74	1
(Hong Kong) Chau Nga-sze	107:15	13	7.27	126	89.68	0
(South Africa) Danielle Kotze	119:21	7	3.52	62	88.71	1

TOI = Time on Ice (minutes:seconds); SA = Shots against; GA = Goals against; GAA = Goals against average; Sv% = Save percentage; SO = Shutouts
Source: IIHF.com

== See also ==
- List of sporting events in Taiwan
