= 1991 IIHF European Women Championships =

1991 IIHF European Women's Championship
Tournament details
- Host country: Czechoslovakia
- Venue(s): Frýdek-Místek, Havířov (in 2 host cities)
- Dates: 15–23 March
- Teams: 10

Final positions
- Champions: Finland (2nd title)

Tournament statistics
- Games played: 25
- Goals scored: 239 (9.56 per game)

The 1991 IIHF European Women Championships was held from 15 to 23 March 1991 in Czechoslovakia. Finland skated to their 2nd consecutive tournament with a 2–1 victory of Sweden in the final, after trailing 1–0 at the end of the 2nd period.

Denmark picked up the bronze medal with a victory over Norway in the 3rd place game. The tournament holds the record for the most teams competing in a single IIHF Women's tournament (10) and most games played at the tournament (25).

== Teams & format ==
Ten teams entered the championship. All of the teams were entered into the final tournament without any qualification. These were:

- Czechoslovakia
- Denmark
- Great Britain
- Finland
- France
- Germany
- Netherlands
- Norway
- Switzerland
- Sweden

The teams were divided into two groups of five teams. Each team played each other once within the group. The teams then played a play-off game against the team with the same position in the opposing group, i.e. the Group Winners played off for Gold and Silver, 2nd place in each group, for Bronze and 4th place etc.

== First round ==
=== Group A ===
==== Standings ====
Pos	Team	Pld	W	D	L	GF	GA	GD	Pts
1	Finland	4	4	0	0	71	0	+71	8
2	Norway	4	3	0	1	31	14	+17	6
3	Switzerland	4	2	0	2	24	20	+4	4
4	France	4	1	0	3	5	53	−48	2
5	Netherlands	4	0	0	4	2	46	−44	0

==== Results ====
All times local (GMT+4)

15 March 1991	Norway	14 – 0 (5 - 0, 3 - 0, 6 - 0)	Netherlands	Havířov

15 March 1991	Switzerland	14 – 0 (1 - 0, 7 - 0, 6 - 0)	France	Havířov

17 March 1991	Finland	20 – 0 (9 - 0, 6 - 0, 5 - 0)	Netherlands	Havířov

17 March 1991	Norway	10 – 1 (2 - 1, 4 - 0, 4 - 0)	France	Havířov

18 March 1991	Finland	28 – 0 (10 - 0, 11 - 0, 7 - 0)	France	Havířov

18 March 1991	Norway	7 – 2 (2 - 0, 3 - 1, 2 - 1)	Switzerland	Havířov

20 March 1991	Finland	12 – 0 (2 - 0, 5 - 0, 5 - 0)	Switzerland	Havířov

20 March 1991	France	4 – 1 (0 - 0, 2 - 1, 2 - 0)	Netherlands	Havířov

21 March 1991	Finland	11 – 0 (7 - 0, 2 - 0, 2 - 0)	Norway	Havířov

21 March 1991	Switzerland	8 – 1 (1 - 0, 2 - 1, 5 - 0)	Netherlands	Havířov

=== Group B ===
==== Standings ====
Pos	Team	Pld	W	D	L	GF	GA	GD	Pts
1	Sweden	4	4	0	0	53	2	+51	8
2	Denmark	4	3	0	1	11	14	−3	6
3	Germany	4	2	0	2	18	14	+4	4
4	Czechoslovakia	4	0	1	3	3	29	−26	1
5	Great Britain	4	0	1	3	2	28	−26	1

==== Results ====
All times local (GMT+4)

15 March 1991	Germany	9 – 1 (2 - 0, 5 - 1, 2 - 0)	Czechoslovakia	Frýdek-Místek

15 March 1991	Denmark	4 – 0 (2 - 0, 2 - 0, 0 - 0)	Great Britain	Frýdek-Místek

16 March 1991	Sweden	15 – 0 (8 - 0, 5 - 0, 2 - 0)	Czechoslovakia	Frýdek-Místek

16 March 1991	Germany	6 – 0 (4 - 0, 1 - 0, 1 - 0)	Great Britain	Frýdek-Místek

18 March 1991	Sweden	16 – 0 (4 - 0, 4 - 0, 8 - 0)	Great Britain	Frýdek-Místek

18 March 1991	Denmark	3 – 2 (2 - 0, 1 - 2, 0 - 0)	Germany	Frýdek-Místek

19 March 1991	Sweden	12 – 1 (4 - 1, 3 - 0, 5 - 0)	Denmark	Frýdek-Místek

19 March 1991	Czechoslovakia	2 – 2 (0 - 2, 1 - 0, 1 - 0)	Great Britain	Frýdek-Místek

21 March 1991	Sweden	10 – 1 (3 - 1, 2 - 0, 5 - 0)	Germany	Frýdek-Místek

21 March 1991	Denmark	3 – 0 (2 - 0, 0 - 0, 1 - 0)	Czechoslovakia	Frýdek-Místek

== Playoff round ==
=== Consolation round 9–10 place ===
23 March 1991	Great Britain	3 – 0 (1 - 0, 1 - 0, 1 - 0)	Netherlands	Frýdek-Místek

=== Consolation round 7–8 place ===
23 March 1991	France	2 – 1 (0 - 1, 1 - 0, 1 - 0)	Czechoslovakia	Havířov

=== Consolation round 5–6 place ===
23 March 1991	Switzerland	6 – 2 (2 - 1, 3 - 0, 1 - 1)	Germany	Frýdek-Místek

=== Match for third place ===
23 March 1991	Denmark	2 – 1 (0 - 1, 0 - 0, 2 - 0)	Norway	Havířov

=== Final ===
23 March 1991	Finland	2 – 1 (0 - 1, 0 - 0, 2 - 0)	Sweden	Frýdek-Místek

== Champions ==
1991 IIHF European Women Championship winners

Finland
2nd title

== Final standings ==
Rk.	Team	Notes
1st place, gold medalist(s)	Finland	Qualified for 1992 World Championship
2nd place, silver medalist(s)	Sweden	Qualified for 1992 World Championship
3rd place, bronze medalist(s)	Denmark	Qualified for 1992 World Championship
4.	Norway	Qualified for 1992 World Championship
5.	Switzerland	Qualified for 1992 World Championship
6.	Germany	
7.	France	Compete in Group B in 1993
8.	Czechoslovakia	Compete in Group B in 1993
9.	Great Britain	Compete in Group B in 1993
10.	Netherlands	Compete in Group B in 1993

== See also ==
- IIHF European Women Championships
