= 1989 IIHF European Women Championships =

1989 IIHF European Women's Championship
Tournament details
- Host country: West Germany
- Venue(s): Düsseldorf, Ratingen (in 2 host cities)
- Dates: April 4 - April 9
- Teams: 8

Final positions
- Champions: Finland (1st title)

Tournament statistics
- Games played: 20
- Goals scored: 220 (11 per game)

The 1989 IIHF European Women Championships (ice hockey) was held April 4–9, 1989, in West Germany, the first European Championship to be held. Finland won their first title with a 7–1 victory over neighbours Sweden in the Final. The hosts West Germany picked up the bronze after edging past Norway on penalty shots.

== Qualification tournament ==
Ten teams entered the championship. Of these, the top six ranked teams received a bye to the final tournament. These were:

- Denmark
- Finland
- Norway
- Switzerland
- Sweden
- West Germany

The final four sides played in Qualification matches. A two-leg aggregate playoff was played with the winners of the two matches taking the final two places.

March 6, 1989	Great Britain	2 – 4 (0 - 0, 1 - 2, 1 - 2)	Netherlands	Chelmsford

March 7, 1989	Great Britain	2 – 4 (0 - 3, 1 - 0, 1 - 1)	Netherlands	Chelmsford

- The Netherlands won the qualifier 8-4 on aggregate.

March 18, 1989	Czechoslovakia	1 – 1 (0 - 0, 1 - 1, 0 - 0)	France	Plzeň

March 19, 1989	Czechoslovakia	4 – 1 (1 - 0, 1 - 0, 2 - 1)	France	Beroun

- Czechoslovakia won the qualifier 5-2 on aggregate.

== Final tournament ==
The eight participating teams were divided up into two seeded groups as below. The teams played each other once in a single round robin format. The top two teams from the group proceeded to the Final Round, while the remaining teams played in the consolation round.

== First round ==
=== Group A ===
==== Standings ====
Pos	Team	Pld	W	D	L	GF	GA	GD	Pts	Qualification
1	Sweden	3	3	0	0	24	3	+21	6	Advanced to Final round
2	Norway	3	1	1	1	18	6	+12	3	Advanced to Final round
3	Switzerland	3	1	1	1	24	15	+9	3	Sent to Consolation round
4	Netherlands	3	0	0	3	1	43	−42	0	Sent to Consolation round

==== Results ====
All times local (GMT+4)

April 4, 1989	Sweden	12 – 0 (3 - 0, 7 - 0, 2 - 0)	Netherlands	Düsseldorf

April 4, 1989	Switzerland	4 – 4 (1 - 0, 2 - 1, 1 - 3)	Norway	Ratingen

April 5, 1989	Switzerland	17 – 1 (6 - 1, 2 - 0, 9 - 0)	Netherlands	Ratingen

April 5, 1989	Sweden	2 – 0 (0 - 0, 1 - 0, 1 - 0)	Norway	Düsseldorf

April 6, 1989	Sweden	10 – 3 (5 - 0, 4 - 1, 1 - 2)	Switzerland	Düsseldorf

April 6, 1989	Norway	14 – 0 (5 - 0, 2 - 0, 7 - 0)	Netherlands	Ratingen

=== Group B ===
==== Standings ====
Pos	Team	Pld	W	D	L	GF	GA	GD	Pts	Qualification
1	Finland	3	3	0	0	57	0	+57	6	Advanced to Final round
2	West Germany	3	2	0	1	17	5	+12	4	Advanced to Final round
3	Denmark	3	1	0	2	6	20	−14	2	Sent to Consolation round
4	Czechoslovakia	3	0	0	3	0	55	−55	0	Sent to Consolation round

==== Results ====
All times local (GMT+4)

April 4, 1989	Finland	34 – 0 (12 - 0, 12 - 0, 10 - 0)	Czechoslovakia	Ratingen

April 4, 1989	West Germany	2 – 0 (0 - 0, 0 - 0, 2 - 0)	Denmark	Düsseldorf

April 5, 1989	Denmark	6 – 0 (2 - 0, 3 - 0, 1 - 0)	Czechoslovakia	Düsseldorf

April 5, 1989	Finland	5 – 0 (0 - 0, 1 - 0, 4 - 0)	West Germany	Ratingen

April 6, 1989	Finland	18 – 0 (4 - 0, 6 - 0, 8 - 0)	Denmark	Ratingen

April 6, 1989	West Germany	15 – 0 (3 - 0, 7 - 0, 5 - 0)	Czechoslovakia	Düsseldorf

== Playoff round ==
=== Consolation round 5–8 place ===
April 8, 1989	Denmark	2 – 1 (1 - 0, 1 - 1, 0 - 0)	Netherlands	Ratingen

April 8, 1989	Switzerland	9 – 3 (3 - 3, 3 - 0, 3 - 0)	Czechoslovakia	Düsseldorf

=== Consolation round 7–8 place ===
April 9, 1989	Czechoslovakia	7 – 1 (3 - 0, 3 - 0, 1 - 1)	Netherlands	Düsseldorf

=== Consolation round 5–6 place ===
April 9, 1989	Switzerland	3 – 1 (0 - 0, 1 - 1, 2 - 0)	Denmark	Ratingen

=== Final round ===
Semi finals 8 April 1989
A1	Finland	9
B2	Norway	1
B1	Sweden	4
A2	West Germany	3

Finals; 9 April 1989
Finland	7
Sweden	1
Bronze Medal Game (APS)
West Germany	2
Norway	1

=== Semifinals ===
April 8, 1989	Finland	9 – 1 (2 - 0, 5 - 1, 2 - 0)	Norway	Düsseldorf

April 8, 1989	Sweden	4 – 3 (2 - 1, 2 - 1, 0 - 1)	West Germany	Ratingen

=== Match for 3-4 Place ===
April 9, 1989	West Germany	2 – 1 (0-0, 1-1, 0-0, 0-0, 1-0)	Norway	Düsseldorf

=== Final ===
April 9, 1989	Finland	7 – 1 (4 - 0, 1 - 0, 2 - 1)	Sweden	Ratingen

== Champions ==
1989 IIHF European Women Championship winners

Finland
1st title

== Final standings ==
Rk.	Team	Notes
1st place, gold medalist(s)	Finland	Qualified for 1990 World Championship
2nd place, silver medalist(s)	Sweden	Qualified for 1990 World Championship
3rd place, bronze medalist(s)	West Germany	Qualified for 1990 World Championship
4.	Norway	Qualified for 1990 World Championship
5.	Switzerland	Qualified for 1990 World Championship
6.	Denmark	
7.	Czechoslovakia	
8.	Netherlands	
9.	France	
10.	Great Britain	

== See also ==
- IIHF European Women Championships
