= IIHF European Women Championships =

Recurring ice hockey competition for women's national teams

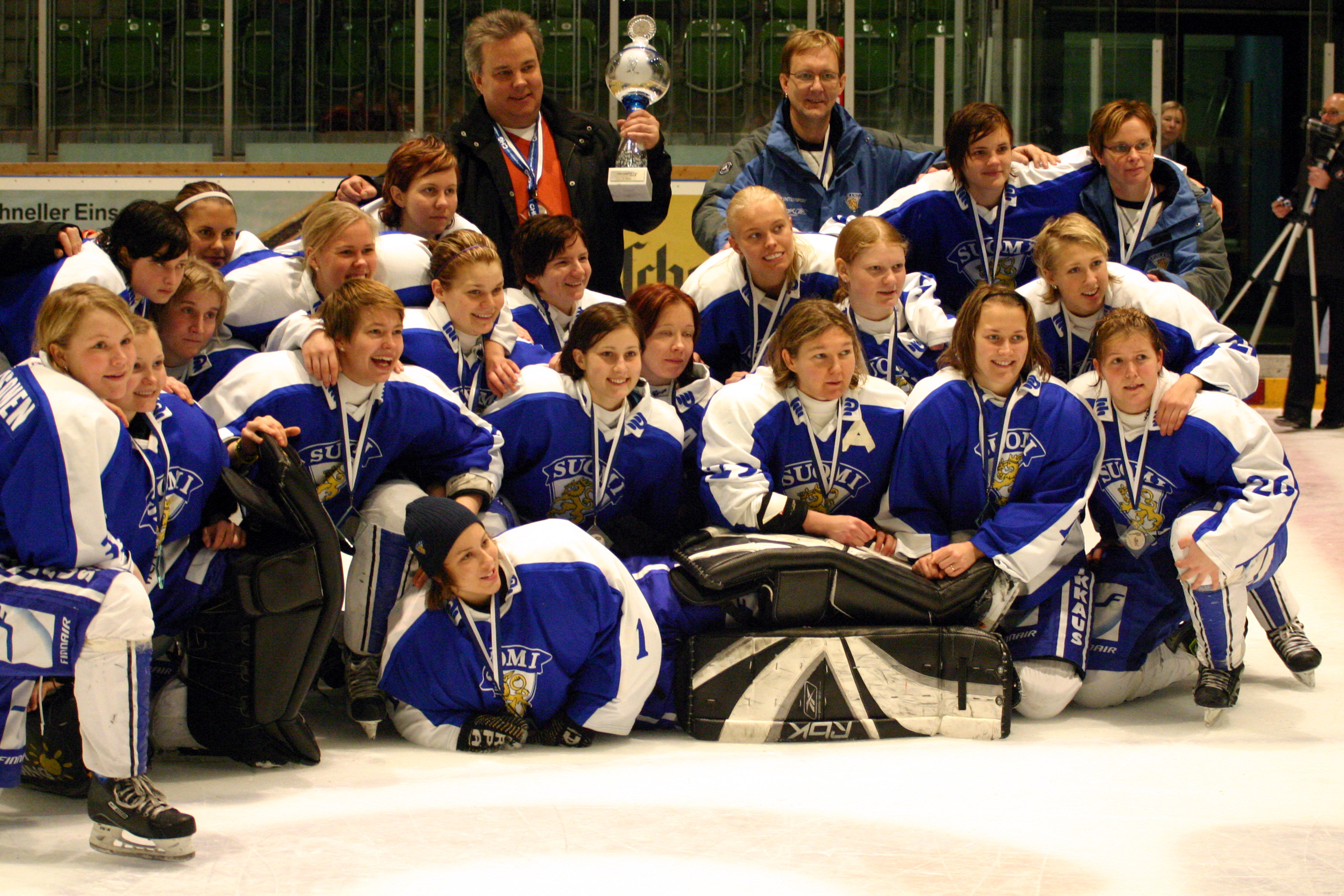
- Finland national women's ice hockey team at the Ravensburg Women's Air Canada Cup 2008
- Status: No longer active
- Genre: Sports event
- Date: January–March
- Frequency: Biannual
- Location: Various
- Inaugurated: 1989; 37 years ago
- Most recent: 1996; 30 years ago
- Organizer: IIHF

The IIHF European Women Championships is a former international women's ice hockey tournament between ice hockey playing nations in Europe. Finland's national women's team won the championship title four times and Sweden women's national ice hockey team won it once in 1996, the final year the competition took place.

The European competition was organized by International Ice Hockey Federation (IIHF) and was played from 1989 to 1996. An international women's ice hockey competition sanctioned by the IIHF began in 1990. The European tournament ceased in 1997 because there would be either an IIHF World Women's Championships or an Olympic tournament every year.

== History ==
The late 1980s marks the modern era of organized women's hockey when the first international invitational tournaments were beginning to become organized. The first IIHF European Women’s Championship, was played in Düsseldorf and Ratingen, Germany, in 1989. Team Finland was the first to win the championship.

== Winners ==
Year	Gold	Silver	Bronze	Country host
1989	Finland	Sweden	West Germany	West Germany
1991	Finland	Sweden	Denmark	Czechoslovakia
1993	Finland	Sweden	Norway	Denmark
1995	Finland	Sweden	Switzerland	Latvia
1996	Sweden	Russia	Finland	Russia

== See also ==
- IIHF European Cup of Nations
- Austria women's ice hockey Bundesliga
- German women's ice hockey Bundesliga
- Switzerland women's ice hockey league
