= Norway women's national ice hockey team =

Norway
- Nickname: The Polar Bears
- Association: Norwegian Ice Hockey Association
- General manager: Randi Aase
- Head coach: André Lysenstøen
- Assistants: Tom Jøstne; Henrik Ratejczak
- Captain: Mathea Fischer
- Most games: Andrea Dalen (97)
- Top scorer: Andrea Dalen (58)
- Most points: Line Bialik (98)
- Team colors
- IIHF code: NOR
Home colours	Away colours

Ranking
- Current IIHF: 12 (▼1) (3 June 2026)
- Highest IIHF: 10 (first in 2012)
- Lowest IIHF: 15 (first in 2005)

First international
- Denmark 2–0 Norway (27 December 1988; Copenhagen, Denmark)

Biggest win
- Norway 14–0 Netherlands (6 April 1989; Ratingen, West Germany); Norway 14–0 Netherlands (15 March 1991; Havířov, Czechoslovakia)

Biggest defeat
- United States 17–0 Norway (21 March 1990; Ottawa, Canada)

World Championships
- Appearances: 26 (first in 1990)
- Best result: 6th, 8th & 9th (1990, 1992, 1994, 1997 & 2025)

European Championships
- Appearances: 5 (first in 1989)
- Best result: (bronze) (1993)

International record (W–L–T)
- 151–193–12

The Norway women's national ice hockey team is the women's national ice hockey team in Norway. The team represents Norway at the International Ice Hockey Federation (IIHF)'s World Women's Championships and is controlled by Norges Ishockeyforbund. Women's ice hockey is growing in popularity in Norway and the number of Norwegian women's ice hockey players registered with the IIHF has increased from 482 in 2011 to 702 in 2019.

== Tournament record ==
=== Olympic Games ===
Norway has never participated in the Women's hockey Olympic tournament.

=== World Championship ===
Norway participated in every Women's World Championship, realizing its best performance during the first three tournaments by garnering a sixth-place finish. In 1999, it failed to qualify for Group A, and has since competed in the lower levels. From 2001 until 2005, the Norway players competed in series to be relegated or promoted between the first and second division. Since 2007, they have competed in Division I. Of note, the National Under-18 team competes in Division I for its respective category.

Year	Result
1990	6th
1992	6th
1994	6th
1997	8th
1999	10th and 2nd in Group B
2000	11th and 3rd in Group B
2001	15th and 7th in Group B
2003	15th and 1st in Division II
2004	14th and 5th in Division I
2005	15th and 1st in Division II
2007	13th and 4th in Division I
2008	14th and 5th in Division I
2009	12th and 3rd in Division I
2011	10th and 2nd in Division I
2012	10th and 2nd in Division IA
2013	13th and 5th in Division IA
2014	10th and 2nd in Division IA
2015	13th and 5th in Division IA
2016	13th and 5th in Division IA
2017	11th and 3rd in Division IA
2018	14th and 5th in Division IA
2019	13th and 3rd in Division IA
2020	Cancelled due to the COVID-19 pandemic
2021	Cancelled due to the COVID-19 pandemic
2022	12th and 2nd in Division IA
2023	15th and 5th in Division IA
2024	11th and 1st in Division IA
2025	9th and 5th in Top Division
2026	15th and 5th Division IA

=== European Women Championship ===
- 1989 – 4th
- 1991 – 4th
- 1993 – (bronze) 3rd
- 1995 – 4th
- 1996 – 4th

== Team ==
=== Current roster ===
Roster for the 2025 IIHF Women's World Championship.

Head coach: André Lysenstøen

No.	Pos.	Name	Height	Weight	Birthdate	Team
1	G	Ena Nystrøm	1.77 m (5 ft 10 in)	72 kg (159 lb)	28 April 2000 (age 26)	(Sweden) Brynäs IF
2	D	Iben Tillman	1.60 m (5 ft 3 in)	63 kg (139 lb)	7 May 2005 (age 21)	(Finland) HPK Hämeenlinna
3	D	Silje Kongstorp	1.73 m (5 ft 8 in)	67 kg (148 lb)	25 August 2002 (age 23)	(Norway) Lillehammer IK
4	D	Thea Rustbakken	1.71 m (5 ft 7 in)	67 kg (148 lb)	14 July 2006 (age 20)	(Norway) Lillehammer IK
5	D	Ava Malthe	1.72 m (5 ft 8 in)	63 kg (139 lb)	31 January 2004 (age 22)	(Canada) Mount Royal Cougars
6	F	Kajsa Bråten	1.63 m (5 ft 4 in)	64 kg (141 lb)	26 May 2007 (age 19)	(Sweden) Färjestad BK
7	F	Karoline Pedersen	1.72 m (5 ft 8 in)	70 kg (150 lb)	13 March 1999 (age 27)	(Denmark) Rødovre SIK
8	F	Lotte Pedersen	1.65 m (5 ft 5 in)	64 kg (141 lb)	28 February 2003 (age 23)	(Norway) Stavanger Oilers
9	F	Tea Nyberg	1.62 m (5 ft 4 in)	65 kg (143 lb)	11 November 2003 (age 22)	(Sweden) HV71
10	F	Millie Rose Sirum	1.75 m (5 ft 9 in)		2 November 2000 (age 25)	(United States) Providence Friars
11	F	Tiril Arntzen	1.66 m (5 ft 5 in)	69 kg (152 lb)	6 February 2007 (age 19)	(Norway) Vålerenga Oslo
12	D	Oda Austefjord	1.60 m (5 ft 3 in)	57 kg (126 lb)	22 May 2007 (age 19)	(Norway) Stavanger Oilers
13	F	Ida Haave	1.67 m (5 ft 6 in)	69 kg (152 lb)	2 July 2006 (age 20)	(Norway) Lillehammer IK
14	F	Tilde Simensen	1.66 m (5 ft 5 in)	60 kg (130 lb)	5 January 2007 (age 19)	(Norway) Stavanger Oilers
15	F	Emilie Kruse	1.67 m (5 ft 6 in)	65 kg (143 lb)	13 October 1999 (age 26)	(Sweden) Leksands IF
16	D	Andrine Furulund	1.78 m (5 ft 10 in)	71 kg (157 lb)	29 June 1998 (age 28)	(Sweden) Färjestad BK
17	F	Marthe Brunvold	1.69 m (5 ft 7 in)	59 kg (130 lb)	25 June 2001 (age 25)	(Sweden) Linköping HC
18	F	Josefine Engmann	1.74 m (5 ft 9 in)	68 kg (150 lb)	9 August 1998 (age 28)	(Norway) Lillehammer IK
19	D	Thea Jørgensen	1.76 m (5 ft 9 in)	80 kg (180 lb)	25 June 2001 (age 25)	(United States) Lindenwood Lady Lions
20	G	Marthe Kongstorp	1.76 m (5 ft 9 in)	78 kg (172 lb)	15 March 2005 (age 21)	(Norway) Lillehammer IK
21	F	Silje Gundersen	1.73 m (5 ft 8 in)	80 kg (180 lb)	8 February 2004 (age 22)	(United States) Lindenwood Lady Lions
22	F	Andrea Dalen – A	1.73 m (5 ft 8 in)	67 kg (148 lb)	19 June 1992 (age 34)	(Sweden) Frölunda HC
23	D	Emma Bergesen – A	1.65 m (5 ft 5 in)	62 kg (137 lb)	1 November 1999 (age 26)	(Sweden) SDE HF
24	F	Mathea Fischer – C	1.70 m (5 ft 7 in)	73 kg (161 lb)	8 October 1997 (age 28)	(Sweden) SDE HF
25	G	Kaja Ekle	1.69 m (5 ft 7 in)	58 kg (128 lb)	6 June 2002 (age 24)	(Sweden) IF Björklöven

== Awards and honors ==
- Ena Nystrøm, Directorate Award, Best Goaltender, 2019 IIHF Women's World Championship Division I
