= Netherlands women's national ice hockey team =

Netherlands
- A lion's head styled after the Coat of arms of the Netherlands is used on the front of player jerseys.
- Nickname: Oranje ('Orange,' from De Oranjes)
- Association: Netherlands Ice Hockey Association
- Head coach: Marco Kronenburg
- Assistants: Marijn den Dulk; Savine Wielenga
- Captain: Kayleigh Hamers
- Most games: Myrthe Martens (110)
- Top scorer: Savine Wielenga (74)
- Most points: Savine Wielenga (134)
- IIHF code: NED

Ranking
- Current IIHF: 16 (3 June 2026)
- Highest IIHF: 17 (first in 2015)
- Lowest IIHF: 23 (2010)

First international
- Japan 5–2 Netherlands (North York or Mississauga, Ontario, Canada; 21 April 1987)

Biggest win
- Netherlands 23–0 Turkey (Bytom, Poland; 8 October 2021)

Biggest defeat
- United States 20–0 Netherlands (North York or Mississauga, Ontario, Canada; 23 April 1987); Finland 20–0 Netherlands (Havířov, Czechoslovakia; 17 March 1991)

World Championships
- Appearances: 22 (first in 1999)
- Best result: 14th (2023)

European Championships
- Appearances: 4 (first in 1989)
- Best result: 8th (1989)

International record (W–L–T)
- 101–113–5

The Netherlands women's national ice hockey team represents the Netherlands in international ice hockey competition, including the International Ice Hockey Federation's (IIHF) Women's World Championship. The women's national team is overseen by Netherlands Ice Hockey Association. In February 2011, the Netherlands were promoted to Division II of the IIHF World Women's Championship. The Netherlands had 362 female ice hockey players registered with the IIHF in 2022, over double the 175 players on record in 2011.

== Tournament record ==
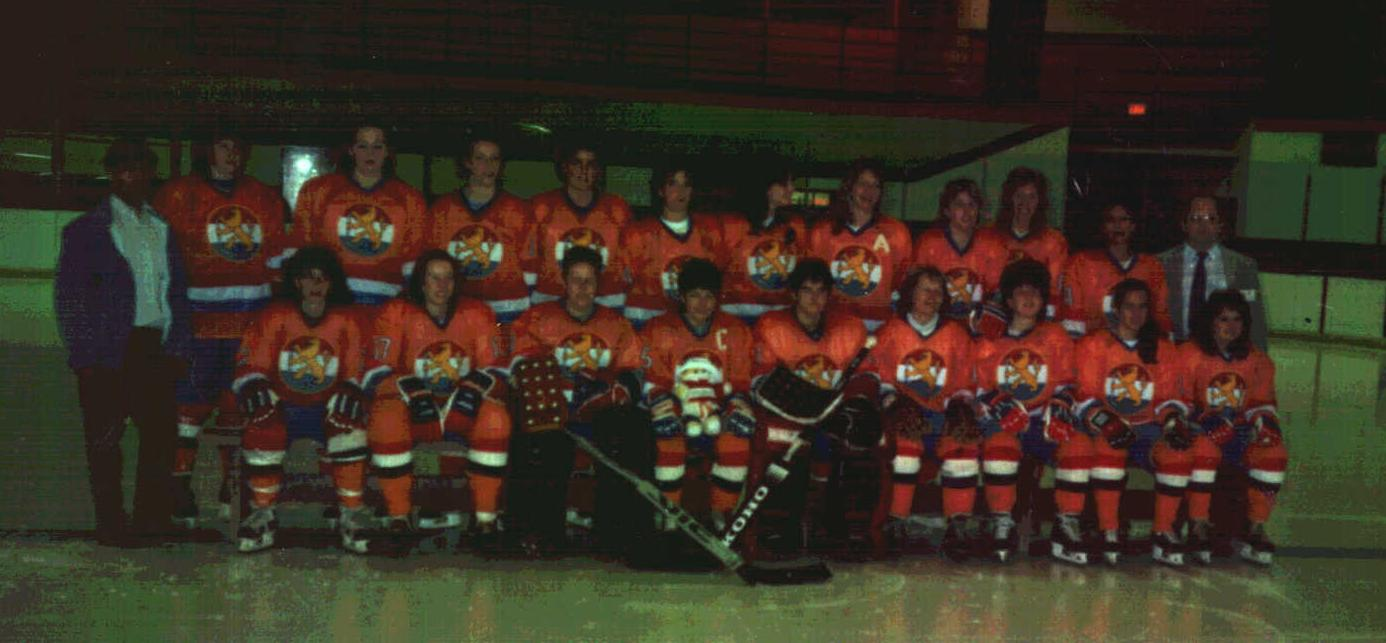
The women's national team (1987)

=== Olympic Games ===
The women's team of Netherlands has never qualified for an Olympic tournament.

=== World Championship ===
1990-2006

- 1999 – Finished in 16th place (8th in Group B)
- 2000 – Finished in 21st place
- 2001 – Finished in 18th place
- 2003 – Finished in 19th place (5th in Division II)
- 2004 – Finished in 19th place (4th in Division II)
- 2005 – Finished in 20th place (6th in Division II)

2007–

World Championship record
Year	Div	Pos	Pld	W	OTW	OTL	L	GF	GA	P/R	RK
2007	II	5th	5	0	1	1	3	6	23	Same position	20th
2008	II	5th	5	1	0	1	3	5	39	Same position	20th
2009	II	6th	5	0	0	1	4	4	17	▼	21st
2010	Competition not held during 2010 Olympics										
2011	III	1st	5	4	1	0	0	33	4	▲	20th
2012	IB	5th	5	1	0	0	4	7	34	Same position	19th
2013	IB	2nd	5	3	1	0	1	16	12	Same position	16th
2014	IB	4th	5	2	1	0	2	16	10	Same position	18th
2015	IB	2nd	5	3	1	0	1	16	6	Same position	16th
2016	IB	6th	5	1	1	0	3	11	14	▼	20th
2017	IIA	2nd	5	4	0	0	1	17	10	Same position	22nd
2018	IIA	1st	5	5	0	0	0	24	3	▲	22nd
2019	IB	1st	5	5	0	0	0	17	4	▲	17th
2020	Cancelled due to the COVID-19 pandemic										
2021	Cancelled due to the COVID-19 pandemic										
2022	IA	5th	4	0	0	1	3	4	7	Same position	15th
2023	IA	4th	5	3	0	0	2	13	12	Same position	14th
2024	IA	5th	5	1	0	2	2	9	15	Same position	15th
2025	IA	6th	5	0	0	1	4	10	23	▼	16th
2026	IB	1st	5	4	0	1	0	18	4	▲	17th
Total			84	37	6	8	33	226	237	—	

=== European Championship ===
European Championship record
Year	Pos	Pld	W	D	L	GF	GA
(West Germany) 1989	8th	5	0	0	5	3	52
(Czechoslovakia) 1991	10th	5	0	0	5	2	49
(Denmark) / (Ukraine) 1993	Did not qualify						
(Latvia) / (Denmark) 1995	12th	4	1	1	2	11	15
(Russia) / (Slovakia) 1996	12th	4	1	1	4	15	15
Total	5/5	18	2	2	14	31	131

=== Elite Women's Hockey League ===
Since the season 2010–11, the Netherlands women's national team participates two times in the Elite Women's Hockey League.

European Hockey League record
Season	Position	Pld	W	OTW	OTL	L	GF	GA
2004-2010	Did not enter							
2010–11	6th	14	3	3	0	8	15	35
2011–12	5th	20	6	1	0	13	40	76
2012-2023	Did not enter							
Total	2/19	34	9	4	0	21	45	111

== Team ==
=== Current roster ===
Roster for the Group A tournament of the 2025 IIHF Women's World Championship Division I.

Head coach: Marco Kronenburg
Assistant coaches: Marijn den Dulk, Katherine Kowalchuk (goaltender)

No.	Pos.	Name	Height	Weight	Birthdate	Team
1	G	Eline Gabriele	1.68 m (5 ft 6 in)	65 kg (143 lb)	11 February 2002 (age 24)	(Netherlands) Utrecht Dragons
2	F	Aimée Seppenwolde	1.65 m (5 ft 5 in)	60 kg (130 lb)	30 May 2003 (age 23)	(United States) Wesleyan Cardinals
3	D	Isabella van den Thillart	1.69 m (5 ft 7 in)	66 kg (146 lb)	14 November 2005 (age 20)	(Netherlands) Red Eagles 's-Hertogenbosch U23
4	D	Kayleigh Hamers	1.60 m (5 ft 3 in)	65 kg (143 lb)	10 June 1997 (age 29)	(Sweden) SDE HF
5	F	Marée Dijkema	1.77 m (5 ft 10 in)	76 kg (168 lb)	24 May 2000 (age 26)	(Austria) Neuberg Highlanders
8	F	Savine Wielenga – C	1.74 m (5 ft 9 in)	71 kg (157 lb)	27 February 1989 (age 37)	(Sweden) Linköping HC
9	F	Bieke van Nes – A	1.71 m (5 ft 7 in)	69 kg (152 lb)	17 September 1995 (age 30)	(Hungary) MAC Budapest
11	F	Nicky Tjin-a-Ton	1.58 m (5 ft 2 in)	58 kg (128 lb)	19 November 1995 (age 30)	(Netherlands) Dolphin Utrecht
12	F	Roos Karst	1.73 m (5 ft 8 in)	67 kg (148 lb)	17 May 2005 (age 21)	(Netherlands) Heerenveen Flyers II
14	D	Jet Milders	1.75 m (5 ft 9 in)	70 kg (150 lb)	9 October 1998 (age 27)	(Hungary) MAC Budapest
15	F	Nina Visser	1.66 m (5 ft 5 in)	63 kg (139 lb)	5 April 2005 (age 21)	(Netherlands) Red Eagles 's-Hertogenbosch U23
16	F	Esther de Jong	1.72 m (5 ft 8 in)	74 kg (163 lb)	4 March 2002 (age 24)	(Sweden) Malmö Redhawks
17	F	Kimberly Collard	1.78 m (5 ft 10 in)	72 kg (159 lb)	19 July 2004 (age 22)	(Austria) Lakers Kärnten
18	D	Michelle van Ooijen	1.67 m (5 ft 6 in)	61 kg (134 lb)	23 June 2002 (age 24)	(Austria) Neuberg Highlanders
19	F	Rana Ilksoy	1.69 m (5 ft 7 in)	61 kg (134 lb)	22 May 2006 (age 20)	(Netherlands) Amsterdam Tigers U17
20	G	Djarna Mans	1.80 m (5 ft 11 in)	78 kg (172 lb)	23 November 2005 (age 20)	(Netherlands) Eindhoven Kemphanen U23
22	D	Anne Hardenbol	1.70 m (5 ft 7 in)	73 kg (161 lb)	13 April 2000 (age 26)	(Netherlands) Dordrecht Lions
23	D	Hilde Huisman – A	1.74 m (5 ft 9 in)	60 kg (130 lb)	13 June 1996 (age 30)	(Austria) Neuburg Highlanders
24	F	Danique Koghee	1.75 m (5 ft 9 in)	70 kg (150 lb)	26 July 2006 (age 20)	(Netherlands) Alkmaar Flames
25	G	Arwen ten Cate	1.83 m (6 ft 0 in)	71 kg (157 lb)	19 March 2005 (age 21)	(Netherlands) Leeuwarden Capitals
