= 2019 Women's Ice Hockey World Championships =

Tournament details
- Host countries: Finland; Hungary; China; Great Britain; Romania; South Africa
- Venues: 7 (in 6 host cities)
- Teams: 39

Final positions
- Champions: United States (8th title)
- Runners-up: Finland
- Third place: Canada

The 2019 Women's Ice Hockey World Championships were the 22nd such series of tournaments organized by the International Ice Hockey Federation. Teams participated at several levels of competition. The competition also served as qualifications for the 2020 competition.

== Championship (Top Division) ==
The Top Division tournament was played in Espoo, Finland, from 4 to 14 April 2019, and for the first time had ten nations participating.

Pos	Grp	Team	Pld	W	OTW	OTL	L	GF	GA	GD	Pts	Final result
1	A	United States	7	6	1	0	0	41	5	+36	20	Champions
2	A	Finland (H)	7	4	0	1	2	21	19	+2	13	Runners-up
3	A	Canada	7	5	0	0	2	33	9	+24	15	Third place
4	A	Russia	7	2	0	0	5	6	35	−29	6	Fourth place
5	A	Switzerland	5	0	0	0	5	3	25	−22	0	Eliminated in Quarter-finals
6	B	Czech Republic	5	4	0	0	1	14	8	+6	12	Eliminated in Quarter-finals
7	B	Germany	5	1	1	1	2	7	13	−6	6	Eliminated in Quarter-finals
8	B	Japan	5	2	0	0	3	9	12	−3	6	Eliminated in Quarter-finals
9	B	Sweden	5	2	0	1	2	11	13	−2	7	Did not play World Championship in 2021 (Note: Sweden were originally supposed to be relegated to Division I A, but that was not played in 2020 and 2021 due to the COVID-19 pandemic. Subsequently, Sweden were supposed to play in the 2022 Division I A, but in the end they remained in the Top Division as a substitute for the expelled Russia.)
10	B	France	5	0	1	0	4	7	13	−6	2	Relegated to the 2022 Division I A

Source: IIHF
Rules for classification: 1) Group; 2) position in the group; 3) number of points; 4) goal difference; 5) goals scored; 6) seeding before tournament.
(H) Host

== Division I ==
=== Division I Group A ===
The Division I Group A tournament was played in Budapest, Hungary, from 7 to 13 April 2019.

Pos	Team	Pld	W	OTW	OTL	L	GF	GA	GD	Pts	Promotion or relegation
1	Hungary (H)	5	4	0	1	0	20	6	+14	13	Promoted to the 2021 Top Division
2	Denmark	5	3	0	0	2	18	16	+2	9 (Note: Denmark 4–0 Norway)	Promoted to the 2021 Top Division
3	Norway	5	3	0	0	2	12	10	+2	9	
4	Austria	5	2	1	0	2	20	13	+7	8	
5	Slovakia	5	1	1	1	2	7	12	−5	6	
6	Italy	5	0	0	0	5	3	23	−20	0	Relegated to the 2022 Division I B

Source: IIHF
Rules for classification: 1) points; 2) head-to-head points; 3) head-to-head goal difference; 4) head-to-head number of goals scored; 5) result against closest best-ranked team outside tied teams; 6) result against second-best-ranked team outside tied teams; 7) seeding before tournament.
(H) Host

=== Division I Group B ===
The Division I Group B tournament was played in Beijing, China, from 6 to 12 April 2019.

Pos	Team	Pld	W	OTW	OTL	L	GF	GA	GD	Pts	Promotion or relegation
1	Netherlands	5	5	0	0	0	17	4	+13	15	Promoted to the 2022 Division I A
2	South Korea	5	3	0	0	2	17	15	+2	9 (Note: South Korea 4–3 Poland)	
3	Poland	5	3	0	0	2	13	12	+1	9	
4	China (H)	5	2	0	0	3	12	12	0	6	
5	Kazakhstan	5	1	0	1	3	8	16	−8	4	
6	Latvia	5	0	1	0	4	4	12	−8	2	Relegated to the 2022 Division II A

Source: IIHF
Rules for classification: 1) points; 2) head-to-head points; 3) head-to-head goal difference; 4) head-to-head number of goals scored; 5) result against closest best-ranked team outside tied teams; 6) result against second-best-ranked team outside tied teams; 7) seeding before tournament.
(H) Host

== Division II ==
=== Division II Group A ===
The Division II Group A tournament was played in Dumfries, Great Britain, from 2 to 8 April 2019.

Pos	Team	Pld	W	OTW	OTL	L	GF	GA	GD	Pts	Promotion or relegation
1	Slovenia	5	3	1	1	0	24	11	+13	12	Promoted to the 2022 Division I B
2	Great Britain (H)	5	3	1	0	1	13	9	+4	11	
3	Spain	5	2	1	1	1	11	11	0	9	
4	Mexico	5	2	0	1	2	14	18	−4	7	
5	North Korea	5	1	1	1	2	12	13	−1	6	
6	Australia	5	0	0	0	5	10	22	−12	0	Relegated to the 2020 Division II B

Source: IIHF
Rules for classification: 1) points; 2) head-to-head points; 3) head-to-head goal difference; 4) head-to-head number of goals scored; 5) result against closest best-ranked team outside tied teams; 6) result against second-best-ranked team outside tied teams; 7) seeding before tournament.
(H) Host

=== Division II Group B ===
The Division II Group B tournament was played in Brașov, Romania, from 1 to 7 April 2019.

Pos	Team	Pld	W	OTW	OTL	L	GF	GA	GD	Pts	Promotion or relegation
1	Chinese Taipei	5	5	0	0	0	20	8	+12	15	Promoted to the 2022 Division II A
2	New Zealand	5	4	0	0	1	18	8	+10	12	
3	Iceland	5	3	0	0	2	21	12	+9	9	
4	Turkey	5	1	0	1	3	15	23	−8	4	
5	Croatia	5	1	0	0	4	7	18	−11	3	
6	Romania (H)	5	0	1	0	4	15	27	−12	2	Relegated to the 2020 Division III

Source: IIHF
Rules for classification: 1) points; 2) head-to-head points; 3) head-to-head goal difference; 4) head-to-head number of goals scored; 5) result against closest best-ranked team outside tied teams; 6) result against second-best-ranked team outside tied teams; 7) seeding before tournament.
(H) Host

=== Division II Group B Qualification ===
The Division II Group B Qualification tournament was played in Cape Town, South Africa, from 13 to 18 January 2019.

Pos	Team	Pld	W	OTW	OTL	L	GF	GA	GD	Pts	Promotion
1	Ukraine	4	4	0	0	0	17	5	+12	12	Promoted to the 2020 Division II B
2	Belgium	4	3	0	0	1	24	7	+17	9	
3	South Africa (H)	4	2	0	0	2	21	17	+4	6	
4	Hong Kong	4	0	1	0	3	11	29	−18	2	
5	Bulgaria	4	0	0	1	3	11	26	−15	1	

Source: IIHF
Rules for classification: 1) points; 2) head-to-head points; 3) head-to-head goal difference; 4) head-to-head number of goals scored; 5) result against closest best-ranked team outside tied teams; 6) result against second-best ranked team outside tied teams; 7) seeding before tournament.
(H) Host
