= 2017 Women's Ice Hockey World Championships =

Tournament details
- Host countries: United States; Austria; Poland; South Korea; Iceland; Chinese Taipei
- Venues: 7 (in 6 host cities)
- Teams: 37

Final positions
- Champions: United States (8th title)
- Runners-up: Canada
- Third place: Finland

The 2017 IIHF Ice Hockey Women's World Championships were the 20th such series of tournaments organized by the International Ice Hockey Federation. Teams participated at several levels of competition. These tournaments also served as qualifications for the 2018 competition.

At the 2017 IIHF annual congress it was decided that the Top Division would expand from eight to ten teams. As a result, all relegations from the 2017 tournaments were cancelled, and there would also be no relegation in all 2018 tournaments.

== Championship (Top Division) ==
The Top Division tournament was played in Plymouth Township, Michigan, United States, from 31 March to 7 April 2017.

Rank	Team
1st place, gold medalist(s)	United States
2nd place, silver medalist(s)	Canada
3rd place, bronze medalist(s)	Finland
4	Germany
5	Russia
6	Sweden
7	Switzerland
8	Czech Republic

Quarterfinals
A4	Russia	1
B1	Germany	2
A3	Finland	4
B2	Sweden	0

Semifinals
A1	United States	11
B1	Germany	0
A2	Canada	4
A3	Finland	0

Final
A1	United States	3
A2	Canada	2
Bronze medal game
A3	Finland	8
B1	Germany	0

== Division I ==
=== Division I Group A ===
The Division I Group A tournament was played in Graz, Austria, from 15 to 21 April 2017.

Pos	Team	Pld	W	OTW	OTL	L	GF	GA	GD	Pts	Promotion
1	Japan	5	5	0	0	0	17	4	+13	15	Promoted to the 2019 Top Division
2	Austria (H)	5	4	0	0	1	20	12	+8	12	
3	Norway	5	2	0	0	3	17	14	+3	6 (Note: NOR: 3 Pts, +4 GD; DEN: 3 Pts, 0 GD; HUN: 3 Pts, −4 GD)	
4	Denmark	5	2	0	0	3	5	12	−7	6	
5	Hungary	5	2	0	0	3	5	11	−6	6	
6	France	5	0	0	0	5	1	12	−11	0	

Source: IIHF
Rules for classification: 1) points; 2) head-to-head points; 3) head-to-head goal difference; 4) head-to-head number of goals scored; 5) result against closest best-ranked team outside tied teams; 6) result against second-best ranked team outside tied teams; 7) seeding before tournament.
(H) Host

=== Division I Group B ===
The Division I Group B tournament was played in Katowice, Poland, from 8 to 14 April 2017.

Pos	Team	Pld	W	OTW	OTL	L	GF	GA	GD	Pts	Promotion
1	Slovakia	5	4	0	0	1	22	9	+13	12	Promoted to the 2018 Division I A
2	Kazakhstan	5	3	0	1	1	11	10	+1	10	
3	Latvia	5	3	0	0	2	13	17	−4	9	
4	China	5	2	1	0	2	13	6	+7	8	
5	Italy	5	1	0	1	3	8	12	−4	4	
6	Poland (H)	5	0	1	0	4	11	24	−13	2	

Source: IIHF
Rules for classification: 1) points; 2) head-to-head points; 3) head-to-head goal difference; 4) head-to-head number of goals scored; 5) result against closest best-ranked team outside tied teams; 6) result against second-best ranked team outside tied teams; 7) seeding before tournament.
(H) Host

== Division II ==
=== Division II Group A ===
The Division II Group A tournament was played in Gangneung, South Korea, from 2 to 8 April 2017.

Pos	Team	Pld	W	OTW	OTL	L	GF	GA	GD	Pts	Promotion
1	South Korea (H)	5	5	0	0	0	21	3	+18	15	Promoted to the 2018 Division I B
2	Netherlands	5	4	0	0	1	17	10	+7	12	
3	Great Britain	5	2	0	1	2	20	16	+4	7	
4	North Korea	5	1	1	0	3	10	13	−3	5	
5	Slovenia	5	1	0	0	4	9	22	−13	3 (Note: Slovenia 3–0 Australia)	
6	Australia	5	1	0	0	4	7	20	−13	3	

Source: IIHF
Rules for classification: 1) points; 2) head-to-head points; 3) head-to-head goal difference; 4) head-to-head number of goals scored; 5) result against closest best-ranked team outside tied teams; 6) result against second-best ranked team outside tied teams; 7) seeding before tournament.
(H) Host

=== Division II Group B ===
The Division II Group B tournament was played in Akureyri, Iceland, from 27 February to 5 March 2017.

Pos	Team	Pld	W	OTW	OTL	L	GF	GA	GD	Pts	Promotion
1	Mexico	5	4	0	0	1	19	9	+10	12	Promoted to the 2018 Division II A
2	Spain	5	3	1	0	1	26	7	+19	11	
3	New Zealand	5	3	0	1	1	20	13	+7	10	
4	Iceland (H)	5	2	0	0	3	19	13	+6	6 (Note: Iceland 6–0 Turkey)	
5	Turkey	5	2	0	0	3	15	31	−16	6	
6	Romania	5	0	0	0	5	10	36	−26	0	

Source: IIHF
Rules for classification: 1) points; 2) head-to-head points; 3) head-to-head goal difference; 4) head-to-head number of goals scored; 5) result against closest best-ranked team outside tied teams; 6) result against second-best ranked team outside tied teams; 7) seeding before tournament.
(H) Host

=== Division II Group B Qualification ===
The Division II Group B Qualification tournament was played in Taipei, Taiwan, from 12 to 17 December 2016.

Pos	Team	Pld	W	OTW	OTL	L	GF	GA	GD	Pts	Promotion
1	Chinese Taipei (H)	4	4	0	0	0	32	3	+29	12	Promoted to the 2018 Division II B
2	Belgium	4	3	0	0	1	22	3	+19	9	
3	South Africa	4	2	0	0	2	22	15	+7	6	
4	Bulgaria	4	1	0	0	3	6	32	−26	3	
5	Hong Kong	4	0	0	0	4	3	32	−29	0	

Source: IIHF
Rules for classification: 1) points; 2) head-to-head points; 3) head-to-head goal difference; 4) head-to-head number of goals scored; 5) result against closest best-ranked team outside tied teams; 6) result against second-best ranked team outside tied teams; 7) seeding before tournament.
(H) Host
