= 2018 Women's Ice Hockey World Championships =

Tournament details
- Host countries: France; Italy; Slovenia; Spain; Bulgaria
- Venues: 5 (in 5 host cities)
- Teams: 29

The 2018 Women's Ice Hockey World Championships were the 21st such series of tournaments organized by the International Ice Hockey Federation. Teams participated at several levels of competition. These tournaments also served as qualifications for the 2019 competition.

For the 2018 program, there was no relegations, only promotions, to raise the total at the top level up to ten nations.

== Championship (Top Division) ==
The Top Division tournament was not held due to the 2018 Olympics.

== Division I ==
=== Division I Group A ===
The Division I Group A tournament was played in Vaujany, France, from 8 to 14 April 2018.

Pos	Team	Pld	W	OTW	OTL	L	GF	GA	GD	Pts	Promotion
1	France (H)	5	4	0	0	1	16	8	+8	12	Promoted to the 2019 Top Division
2	Austria	5	3	0	0	2	19	15	+4	9 (Note: Austria 6–4 Hungary)	
3	Hungary	5	3	0	0	2	21	13	+8	9	
4	Denmark	5	2	0	0	3	14	15	−1	6 (Note: Norway 0–1 Denmark)	
5	Norway	5	2	0	0	3	7	10	−3	6	
6	Slovakia	5	1	0	0	4	8	24	−16	3	

Source: IIHF
Rules for classification: 1) points; 2) head-to-head points; 3) head-to-head goal difference; 4) head-to-head number of goals scored; 5) result against closest best-ranked team outside tied teams; 6) result against second-best-ranked team outside tied teams; 7) seeding before tournament.
(H) Host

=== Division I Group B ===
The Division I Group B tournament was played in Asiago, Italy, from 8 to 14 April 2018.

Pos	Team	Pld	W	OTW	OTL	L	GF	GA	GD	Pts	Promotion
1	Italy (H)	5	4	0	0	1	14	6	+8	12	Promoted to the 2019 Division I A
2	South Korea	5	3	1	0	1	20	8	+12	11	
3	Latvia	5	3	0	0	2	7	12	−5	9	
4	Kazakhstan	5	2	0	1	2	9	10	−1	7	
5	China	5	2	0	0	3	7	7	0	6	
6	Poland	5	0	0	0	5	7	21	−14	0	

Source: IIHF
Rules for classification: 1) points; 2) head-to-head points; 3) head-to-head goal difference; 4) head-to-head number of goals scored; 5) result against closest best-ranked team outside tied teams; 6) result against second-best-ranked team outside tied teams; 7) seeding before tournament.
(H) Host

== Division II ==
=== Division II Group A ===
The Division II Group A tournament was played in Maribor, Slovenia, from 31 March to 6 April 2018.

Pos	Team	Pld	W	OTW	OTL	L	GF	GA	GD	Pts	Promotion
1	Netherlands	5	5	0	0	0	24	3	+21	15	Promoted to the 2019 Division I B
2	Great Britain	5	4	0	0	1	17	7	+10	12	
3	North Korea	5	3	0	0	2	14	15	−1	9	
4	Australia	5	2	0	0	3	10	17	−7	6	
5	Slovenia (H)	5	1	0	0	4	14	15	−1	3	
6	Mexico	5	0	0	0	5	3	25	−22	0	

Source: IIHF
Rules for classification: 1) points; 2) head-to-head points; 3) head-to-head goal difference; 4) head-to-head number of goals scored; 5) result against closest best-ranked team outside tied teams; 6) result against second-best ranked team outside tied teams; 7) seeding before tournament.
(H) Host

=== Division II Group B ===
The Division II Group B tournament was played in Valdemoro, Spain, from 17 to 23 March 2018.

Pos	Team	Pld	W	OTW	OTL	L	GF	GA	GD	Pts	Promotion
1	Spain (H)	5	5	0	0	0	29	5	+24	15	Promoted to the 2019 Division II A
2	Chinese Taipei	5	4	0	0	1	24	16	+8	12	
3	Iceland	5	2	1	0	2	25	11	+14	8	
4	New Zealand	5	2	0	1	2	24	21	+3	7	
5	Turkey	5	1	0	0	4	17	31	−14	3	
6	Romania	5	0	0	0	5	12	47	−35	0	

Source: IIHF
Rules for classification: 1) points; 2) head-to-head points; 3) head-to-head goal difference; 4) head-to-head number of goals scored; 5) result against closest best-ranked team outside tied teams; 6) result against second-best ranked team outside tied teams; 7) seeding before tournament.
(H) Host

=== Division II Group B Qualification ===
The Division II Group B Qualification tournament was played in Sofia, Bulgaria, from 4 to 9 December 2017.

Pos	Team	Pld	W	OTW	OTL	L	GF	GA	GD	Pts	Promotion
1	Croatia	4	4	0	0	0	27	2	+25	12	Promoted to the 2019 Division II B
2	Belgium	4	3	0	0	1	26	2	+24	9	
3	South Africa	4	2	0	0	2	12	8	+4	6	
4	Hong Kong	4	1	0	0	3	4	33	−29	3	
5	Bulgaria (H)	4	0	0	0	4	3	27	−24	0	

Source: IIHF
Rules for classification: 1) points; 2) head-to-head points; 3) head-to-head goal difference; 4) head-to-head number of goals scored; 5) result against closest best-ranked team outside tied teams; 6) result against second-best ranked team outside tied teams; 7) seeding before tournament.
(H) Host
