= 2014 IIHF Women's World Championship Division II =

Tournament details
- Host countries: Italy; Iceland; Mexico
- Venues: 3 (in 3 host cities)
- Dates: 6–12 April 2014; 24–30 March 2014; 19–22 March 2014
- Teams: 16

The 2014 IIHF Women's World Championship Division II consisted of three international ice hockey tournaments organized by the International Ice Hockey Federation. Division II A, Division II B and Division II B Qualification represent the fourth, fifth and sixth tier of the IIHF Women's World Championship.

== Division II Group A ==
2014 IIHF Women's World Championship Division II A
Tournament details
- Host country: Italy
- City: Asiago
- Venue: 1 (in 1 host city)
- Dates: 6–12 April 2014
- Teams: 6

Tournament statistics
- Games played: 15
- Goals scored: 79 (5.27 per game)
- Attendance: 4,885 (326 per game)

The Division II Group A tournament was played in Asiago, Italy, from 6 to 12 April 2014.

The winners of this tournament were promoted to the Division I Group B, while the last-placed team were relegated to the Division II Group B for the 2015 championship.

=== Participating teams ===
Team	Qualification
Great Britain	placed 6th in Division I B last year and were relegated
Italy	hosts; placed 2nd in Division II A last year
Australia	placed 3rd in Division II A last year
New Zealand	placed 4th in Division II A last year
Poland	placed 5th in Division II A last year
South Korea	placed 1st in Division II B last year and were promoted

=== Final standings ===
Pos	Team	Pld	W	OTW	OTL	L	GF	GA	GD	Pts	Promotion or relegation
1	Italy (H)	5	4	1	0	0	20	5	+15	14	Promoted to the 2015 Division I B
2	Great Britain	5	3	0	1	1	12	8	+4	10	
3	South Korea	5	1	2	0	2	9	10	−1	7	
4	Poland	5	2	0	1	2	18	18	0	7	
5	New Zealand	5	1	0	1	3	7	15	−8	4	
6	Australia	5	1	0	0	4	13	23	−10	3	Relegated to the 2015 Division II B

Source: IIHF
(H) Host

=== Match results ===
All times are local (Central European Summer Time – UTC+2).

6 April 2014; 13:15	South Korea	2–1 GWS (0–1, 1–0, 0–0) (OT 0–0) (SO: 1–0)	New Zealand	PalaOdegar, Asiago; Attendance: 125

Game reference
Shin So-Jung	Goalies	Grace Harrison	Referee: (Russia) Arina Ustinova; Linesmen: (Italy) Mirjam Gruber (Slovakia) Viera Šilhavíková
/ 0–1 / 19:58 – K. Langford (A. Goulding); Park J-A. (Han S-J.) (PP) – 39:56 / 1–1			Referee: (Russia) Arina Ustinova; Linesmen: (Italy) Mirjam Gruber (Slovakia) Viera Šilhavíková
Choi J-Y. Park J-A. (miss); Han S-J. (miss)	Shootout	(miss) K. Langford; (miss) A. Thakker; (miss) T. Tissink	Referee: (Russia) Arina Ustinova; Linesmen: (Italy) Mirjam Gruber (Slovakia) Viera Šilhavíková
14 min	Penalties	14 min	Referee: (Russia) Arina Ustinova; Linesmen: (Italy) Mirjam Gruber (Slovakia) Viera Šilhavíková
28	Shots	21	Referee: (Russia) Arina Ustinova; Linesmen: (Italy) Mirjam Gruber (Slovakia) Viera Šilhavíková

6 April 2014; 16:45	Australia	2–6 (1–2, 0–2, 1–2)	Great Britain	PalaOdegar, Asiago; Attendance: 250

Game reference

Jodie Walker
Michelle Coonan
Goalies
Laura Saunders
Referee:
(Japan) Miyuki Nakayama
Linesmen:
(Italy) Helga Tschorner
(Germany) Harriet Weegh

	0–1	00:43 – N. Aldridge (A. Handisides)
S. Green (A. del Basso, G. Moore) (PP) – 03:05	1–1
	1–2	17:08 – K. Gale (L. Durnell, J. Curtis)
	1–3	30:29 – A. Lamb (G. Farman, L. Durnell) (PP)
	1–4	37:53 – L. Ganney (S. Allen)
	1–5	43:35 – J-L. Bloom (S. Allen)
A. del Basso (S. Green, R. Padjen) – 45:07	2–5
	2–6	55:16 – G. Farman (A. Handisides)

8 min
Penalties
8 min
17
Shots
27

6 April 2014; 20:30	Italy	5–2 (4–1, 0–1, 1–0)	Poland	PalaOdegar, Asiago; Attendance: 400

Game reference

Giulia Mazzocchi
Goalies
Agata Kosińska
Referee:
(Germany) Michaela Kiefer
Linesmen:
(United States) Michaela Frattarelli
(France) Sueva Torribio

F. Zandegiacomo (B. Larger, S. Gius) – 01:17	1–0
B. Larger (L. de Rocco) – 09:43	2–0
E. Dalpra (C. Saletta) – 13:07	3–0
	3–1	15:20 – S. Bielas (I. Malinowska, K. Frackowiak) (PP)
A. de Divonne (E. Dalpra) (PP) – 19:10	4–1
	4–2	31:04 – I. Malinowska (PP2)
V. Bettarini (A. de Divonne) (PP) – 46:30	5–2

8 min
Penalties
14 min
27
Shots
23

7 April 2014; 13:15	Great Britain	2–0 (0–0, 1–0, 1–0)	New Zealand	PalaOdegar, Asiago; Attendance: 150

Game reference
Nicole Jackson	Goalies	Grace Harrison	Referee: (Germany) Michaela Kiefer; Linesmen: (Belgium) Marine Dinant (France) Sueva Torribio
L. Durnell (J. Curtis) – 30:06 / 1–0; L. Ganney – 57:47 / 2–0			Referee: (Germany) Michaela Kiefer; Linesmen: (Belgium) Marine Dinant (France) Sueva Torribio
8 min	Penalties	2 min	Referee: (Germany) Michaela Kiefer; Linesmen: (Belgium) Marine Dinant (France) Sueva Torribio
52	Shots	15	Referee: (Germany) Michaela Kiefer; Linesmen: (Belgium) Marine Dinant (France) Sueva Torribio

7 April 2014; 16:45	Poland	2–3 GWS (1–1, 1–0, 0–1) (OT 0–0) (SO: 0–1)	South Korea	PalaOdegar, Asiago; Attendance: 110

Game reference

Agata Kosińska
Goalies
Shin So-Jung
Referee:
(Slovakia) Zuzana Findurova
Linesmen:
(United States) Michaela Frattarelli
(Italy) Helga Tschorner

M. Czaplik (K. Pozniewska, A. Pioro) – 00:25	1–0
	1–1	15:01 – Ahn K-Y.
M. Czaplik (K. Pozniewska) (PP) – 23:45	2–1
	2–2	44:07 – Lee K-S. (Han S-J.) (PP)

K. Chrapek (miss)
K. Pozniewska
K. Wieczorek (miss)
Shootout
Choi J-Y.
Park J-A.
(miss) Han S-J.
6 min
Penalties
10 min
50
Shots
28

7 April 2014; 20:30	Italy	6–2 (3–1, 1–1, 2–0)	Australia	PalaOdegar, Asiago; Attendance: 400

Game reference

Giulia Mazzocchi
Goalies
Jodie Walker
Referee:
(Russia) Arina Ustinova
Linesmen:
(Slovakia) Viera Šilhavíková
(Germany) Harriet Weegh

A. de Divonne (L. de Rocco, C. Saletta) (PP) – 02:09	1–0
	1–1	02:36 – S. Crompton
H. Elliscasis – 11:10	2–1
B. Larger (PS) – 18:01	3–1
	3–2	31:34 – S. Green (S. Newmark) (PP)
E. Dalpra (C. Saletta) (SH) – 39:51	4–2
E. Dalpra (E. Ballardini) – 45:31	5–2
F. Zandegiacomo (S. Gius) – 57:10	6–2

8 min
Penalties
10 min
53
Shots
8

9 April 2014; 13:15	Great Britain	1–4 (1–3, 0–0, 0–1)	Poland	PalaOdegar, Asiago; Attendance: 120

Game reference

Laura Saunders
Nicole Jackson
Goalies
Agata Kosińska
Referee:
(Germany) Michaela Kiefer
Linesmen:
(Italy) Mirjam Gruber
(Italy) Helga Tschorner

K. Gale (N. Aldridge, L. Durnell) – 01:38	1–0
	1–1	04:13 – K. Pozniewska (SH)
	1–2	05:47 – A. Pioro (K. Pozniewska) (PP2)
	1–3	13:22 – M. Czaplik (A. Pioro)
	1–4	52:16 – K. Pozniewska (A. Pioro)

8 min
Penalties
14 min
40
Shots
34

9 April 2014; 16:45	Australia	3–2 (0–1, 2–0, 1–1)	New Zealand	PalaOdegar, Asiago; Attendance: 150

Game reference

Jodie Walker
Goalies
Grace Harrison
Referee:
(Slovakia) Zuzana Findurova
Linesmen:
(United States) Michaela Frattarelli
(Slovakia) Viera Šilhavíková

	0–1	10:27 – T. Tissink (A. Thakker, S. Murray)
K. Tihema (SH) – 24:03	1–1
A. del Basso – 26:07	2–1
R. Padjen (A. del Basso) – 45:33	3–1
	3–2	57:53 – C. Heale (A. Thakker)

12 min
Penalties
10 min
27
Shots
23

9 April 2014; 20:30	Italy	3–1 (2–1, 1–0, 0–0)	South Korea	PalaOdegar, Asiago; Attendance: 380

Game reference

Giulia Mazzocchi
Goalies
Shin So-Jung
Referee:
(Japan) Miyuki Nakayama
Linesmen:
(Belgium) Marine Dinant
(Germany) Harriet Weegh

H. Elliscasis (E. Bonafini) – 01:07	1–0
C. Saletta (E. Dalpra) – 03:23	2–0
	2–1	13:11 – Lee Y-J. (Han S-J.) (SH)
E. Dalpra (C. Saletta) – 33:42	3–1

6 min
Penalties
6 min
48
Shots
14

10 April 2014; 13:15	Poland	7–5 (3–1, 1–2, 3–2)	Australia	PalaOdegar, Asiago; Attendance: 100

Game reference

Agata Kosińska
Goalies
Jodie Walker
Michelle Coonan
Referee:
(Russia) Arina Ustinova
Linesmen:
(United States) Michaela Frattarelli
(Italy) Mirjam Gruber

K. Pozniewska (M. Czaplik) – 03:20	1–0
M. Czaplik (K. Pozniewska)(PP) – 16:48	2–0
	2–1	18:31 – K. Tihema
K. Pozniewska – 19:09	3–1
	3–2	33:25 – S. Green (R. Padjen, G. Moore) (PP)
M. Bigos (A. Cygan) – 35:10	4–2
	4–3	38:01 – T. Hocutt (S. Green)
M. Czaplik – 40:51	5–3
	5–4	44:28 – T. Hocutt (S. Newmark, R. Padjen) (PP)
K. Chrapek (K. Pozniewska) – 55:23	6–4
K. Chrapek (K. Pozniewska) (ENG) – 58:04	7–4
	7–5	59:04 – S. Green

18 min
Penalties
20 min
30
Shots
40

10 April 2014; 16:45	South Korea	1–3 (0–0, 0–0, 1–3)	Great Britain	PalaOdegar, Asiago; Attendance: 150

Game reference

Shin So-Jung
Goalies
Nicole Jackson
Referee:
(Japan) Miyuki Nakayama
Linesmen:
(Belgium) Marine Dinant
(Italy) Helga Tschorner

	0–1	40:34 – G. Farman (L. Durnell)
	0–2	52:36 – L. Ganney
	0–3	53:03 – N. Aldridge (G. Farman)
Ho S-S. (Choi J-Y.) – 58:33	1–3

4 min
Penalties
4 min
27
Shots
38

10 April 2014; 20:30	New Zealand	0–5 (0–2, 0–2, 0–1)	Italy	PalaOdegar, Asiago; Attendance: 500

Game reference

Lyndal Heinemann
Grace Harrison
Goalies
Daniela Klotz
Referee:
(Slovakia) Zuzana Findurova
Linesmen:
(France) Sueva Torribio
(Germany) Harriet Weegh

0–1	11:22 – H. Elliscasis (D. de Rugna, E. Bonafini)
0–2	14:10 – E. Dalpra (C. Saletta) (EA)
0–3	24:45 – C. Saletta (A. de Divonne)
0–4	29:51 – C. Saletta (A. de Divonne)
0–5	57:10 – G. Battisti (H. Caldart, E. Ballardini) (PP)

18 min
Penalties
8 min
17
Shots
97

12 April 2014; 13:15	Australia	1–2 (1–0, 0–0, 0–2)	South Korea	PalaOdegar, Asiago; Attendance: 200

Game reference

Michelle Coonan
Goalies
Shin So-Jung
Referee:
(Russia) Arina Ustinova
Linesmen:
(Italy) Mirjam Gruber
(Slovakia) Viera Šilhavíková

S. Lehmann (S. Newmark) – 06:53	1–0
	1–1	46:58 – Ahn K-Y. (Lee Y-J.)
	1–2	54:46 – Han S-J. (Choi J-Y.)

14 min
Penalties
6 min
25
Shots
19

12 April 2014; 16:45	New Zealand	4–3 (0–1, 1–1, 3–1)	Poland	PalaOdegar, Asiago; Attendance: 150

Game reference

Grace Harrison
Goalies
Agata Kosińska
Referee:
(Germany) Michaela Kiefer
Linesmen:
(Belgium) Marine Dinant
(Germany) Harriet Weegh

	0–1	16:38 – K. Wieczorek (K. Frackowiak)
	0–2	35:52 – P. Sfora (M. Czaplik) (PP)
S. de la Barra (A. Thakker) – 39:15	1–2
K. Woodyear-Smith (H. Murray, A. Thakker) – 41:21	2–2
A. Thakker (C. Heale) – 53:35	3–2
	3–3	55:04 – M. Czaplik (P. Sfora) (PP)
A. Thakker (H. Murray, T. Tissink) (PP) – 57:53	4–3

26 min
Penalties
8 min
26
Shots
35

12 April 2014; 20:30	Great Britain	0–1 GWS (0–0, 0–0, 0–0) (OT 0–0) (SO: 0–1)	Italy	PalaOdegar, Asiago; Attendance: 1,700

Game reference
Nicole Jackson	Goalies	Giulia Mazzocchi	Referee: (Japan) Miyuki Nakayama; Linesmen: (United States) Michaela Frattarelli (France) Sueva Torribio
L. Durnell (miss); L. Adams (miss)	Shootout	B. Larger; E. Dalpra	Referee: (Japan) Miyuki Nakayama; Linesmen: (United States) Michaela Frattarelli (France) Sueva Torribio
12 min	Penalties	20 min	Referee: (Japan) Miyuki Nakayama; Linesmen: (United States) Michaela Frattarelli (France) Sueva Torribio
26	Shots	43	Referee: (Japan) Miyuki Nakayama; Linesmen: (United States) Michaela Frattarelli (France) Sueva Torribio

=== Awards and statistics ===
==== Awards ====
- Best players selected by the directorate:
  - Best Goalkeeper: (South Korea) Shin So-Jung
  - Best Defenseman: (Italy) Valentina Bettarini
  - Best Forward: (Poland) Karolina Pozniewska

Source: IIHF.com

==== Scoring leaders ====
List shows the top skaters sorted by points, then goals.

Player	GP	G	A	Pts	+/−	PIM	POS
(Poland) Karolina Pozniewska	5	4	7	11	+5	6	F
(Poland) Magdalena Czaplik	5	7	1	8	+5	0	F
(Italy) Carola Saletta	5	3	5	8	+8	4	F
(Italy) Eleonora Dalpra	5	5	2	7	+7	4	F
(Australia) Shona Green	5	4	2	6	−2	6	F
(New Zealand) Anjali Thakker	5	3	3	6	−2	4	F
(Italy) Anna de Divonne	5	2	3	5	+6	0	F
(United Kingdom) Louisa Durnell	5	1	4	5	+4	2	F
(Italy) Beatrix Larger	5	3	1	4	+1	4	F
(Australia) Alivia del Basso	5	2	2	4	−3	2	F
(United Kingdom) Georgina Farman	5	2	2	4	+3	0	F

GP = Games played; G = Goals; A = Assists; Pts = Points; +/− = Plus/minus; PIM = Penalties in minutes; POS = Position
Source: IIHF.com

==== Leading goaltenders ====
Only the top five goaltenders, based on save percentage, who have played at least 40% of their team's minutes, are included in this list.

Player	TOI	GA	GAA	SA	Sv%	SO
(United Kingdom) Nicole Jackson	231:18	3	0.78	112	97.32	1
(South Korea) Shin So-Jung	309:01	10	1.94	182	94.51	0
(New Zealand) Grace Harrison	272:05	11	2.43	173	93.64	0
(Italy) Giulia Mazzocchi	245:00	5	1.22	71	92.96	1
(Poland) Agata Kosińska	304:42	18	3.54	161	88.82	0

TOI = Time on ice (minutes:seconds); SA = Shots against; GA = Goals against; GAA = Goals against average; Sv% = Save percentage; SO = Shutouts
Source: IIHF.com

== Division II Group B ==
2014 IIHF Women's World Championship Division II B
Tournament details
- Host country: Iceland
- City: Reykjavík
- Venue: 1 (in 1 host city)
- Dates: 24–30 March 2014
- Teams: 6

Tournament statistics
- Games played: 15
- Goals scored: 91 (6.07 per game)
- Attendance: 2,465 (164 per game)

The Division II Group B tournament was played in Reykjavík, Iceland, from 24 to 30 March 2014.

The winners of this tournament were promoted to the Division II Group A, while the last-placed team were relegated to the Division II Group B Qualification for the 2015 championship.

=== Participating teams ===
Team	Qualification
Slovenia	placed 6th in Division II A last year and were relegated
Spain	placed 2nd in Division II B last year
Croatia	placed 3rd in Division II B last year
Iceland	hosts; placed 4th in Division II B last year
Belgium	placed 5th in Division II B last year
Turkey	placed 1st in Division II B Qualification last year and were promoted

=== Final standings ===
Pos	Team	Pld	W	OTW	OTL	L	GF	GA	GD	Pts	Promotion or relegation
1	Croatia	5	5	0	0	0	26	8	+18	15	Promoted to the 2015 Division II A
2	Slovenia	5	4	0	0	1	24	9	+15	12	
3	Spain	5	3	0	0	2	22	15	+7	9	
4	Iceland (H)	5	2	0	0	3	8	14	−6	6	
5	Belgium	5	0	1	0	4	3	21	−18	2	
6	Turkey	5	0	0	1	4	8	24	−16	1	Relegated to the 2015 Division II B Qualification

Source: IIHF
(H) Host

=== Match results ===
All times are local (Greenwich Mean Time – UTC±0).

24 March 2014; 13:00	Spain	5–0 (1–0, 2–0, 2–0)	Belgium	Laugardalur Arena, Reykjavík; Attendance: 78

Game reference

Carlota Alvarado
Goalies
Kirsten Schonwetter
Jente Vanroy
Referee:
(Italy) Deana Cuglietta
Linesmen:
(United Kingdom) Leigh Hetherington
(Switzerland) Anne Kuonen

A. Ucedo (V. Muñoz) – 00:40	1–0
A. Ucedo (V. Muñoz) – 21:44	2–0
V. Muñoz (A. Merino, E. Álvarez) – 29:54	3–0
A. Merino (A. González) – 41:34	4–0
A. Ucedo (V. Muñoz) – 52:18	5–0

2 min
Penalties
10 min
47
Shots
11

24 March 2014; 16:30	Croatia	3–2 (0–0, 2–1, 1–1)	Slovenia	Laugardalur Arena, Reykjavík; Attendance: 114

Game reference

Petra Belobrk
Goalies
Ines Confidenti
Referee:
(Sweden) Katarina Timglas
Linesmen:
(Iceland) Ingibjörg Hjartardóttir
(Norway) Cathrine Vestheim

	0–1	20:41 – U. Pazlar (I. Kraner)
D. Kruselj Posaveć – 30:34	1–1
D. Kruselj Posaveć (E. Filipec) – 39:30	2–1
	2–2	42:19 – N. Vakaričič (P. Pren)
M. Klanac (A. Kadijević) – 49:08	3–2

2 min
Penalties
8 min
41
Shots
24

24 March 2014; 20:00	Turkey	2–3 (0–0, 0–2, 2–1)	Iceland	Laugardalur Arena, Reykjavík; Attendance: 358

Game reference

Sera Doğramacı
Goalies
Gudlaug Thorsteinsdóttir
Referee:
(Austria) Ulrike Winklmayr
Linesmen:
(Finland) Satu Auno
(Denmark) Loise Larsen

	0–1	27:40 – S. Shantz-Smiley (L. Sigfúsdóttir, G. Vidarsdóttir) (PP)
	0–2	28:44 – A. Ágústsdóttir (B. Bergthorsdóttir, F. Jóhannesdóttir) (PP)
T. Dokur (İ. Uygun) (PP) – 44:35	1–2
F. Yurt (S. Yılmaz) (PP) – 47:43	2–2
	2–3	51:38 – S. Sigurgeirsdóttir (F. Jóhannesdóttir)

10 min
Penalties
16 min
14
Shots
38

25 March 2014; 13:00	Spain	5–7 (2–2, 1–3, 2–2)	Croatia	Laugardalur Arena, Reykjavík; Attendance: 107

Game reference

Petra Belobrk
Goalies
Carlota Alvarado
Referee:
(Austria) Ulrike Winklmayr
Linesmen:
(Switzerland) Anne Kuonen
(South Korea) Lee Kyung-Sun

	0–1	07:05 – E. Filipec (D. Kruselj Posaveć) (PP)
V. Abrisqueta – 07:51	1–1
A. Calero – 11:00	2–1
	2–2	14:17 – M. Smolec (A. Kadijević)
	2–3	22:05 – D. Kruselj Posaveć (E. Filipec) (PP)
	2–4	35:02 – A. Kadijević (E. Filipec, D. Kruselj Posaveć) (PP)
L. Ortuño (M. Gurrea) (PP) – 37:57	3–4
	3–5	39:36 – D. Kruselj Posaveć (M. Smolec)
V. Abrisqueta (E. Marques) – 40:28	4–5
M. Gurrea (L. Ortuño) – 54:24	5–5
	5–6	54:52 – A. Kadijević (M. Klanac)
	5–7	59:53 – D. Kruselj Posaveć (A. Širanović) (PP, ENG)

10 min
Penalties
8 min
31
Shots
43

25 March 2014; 16:30	Belgium	2–1 OT (0–0, 0–0, 1–1) (OT 1–0)	Turkey	Laugardalur Arena, Reykjavík; Attendance: 132

Game reference

Kirsten Schonwetter
Goalies
Sera Doğramacı
Referee:
(Finland) Henna Aberg
Linesmen:
(Finland) Satu Auno
(Iceland) Ingibjörg Hjartardóttir

	0–1	41:00 – B. Taygar (T. Dokur)
S. Frere (L. Buret) – 48:54	1–1
R. de Wolf – 63:28	2–1

6 min
Penalties
6 min
40
Shots
16

25 March 2014; 20:00	Slovenia	5–2 (1–1, 1–0, 3–1)	Iceland	Laugardalur Arena, Reykjavík; Attendance: 249

Game reference

Ines Confidenti
Goalies
Karitas Halldórsdóttir
Referee:
(Italy) Deana Cuglietta
Linesmen:
(United Kingdom) Leigh Hetherington
(Norway) Cathrine Vestheim

	0–1	02:51 – L. Sveinsdóttir (S. Shantz-Smiley)
N. Vakaričič (P. Pren) (PP) – 04:41	1–1
S. Confidenti (P. Pren, M. Duh) – 32:57	2–1
P. Pren (S. Confidenti) – 41:28	3–1
S. Confidenti (M. Duh, P. Pren) – 50:42	4–1
T. Lepir (M. Duh, P. Pren) (PP) – 59:16	5–1
	5–2	59:52 – H. Einarsdóttir-Thorlacius

12 min
Penalties
8 min
32
Shots
16

27 March 2014; 13:00	Slovenia	4–0 (0–0, 2–0, 2–0)	Belgium	Laugardalur Arena, Reykjavík; Attendance: 112

Game reference

Ines Confidenti
Goalies
Jente Vanroy
Referee:
(Austria) Ulrike Winklmayr
Linesmen:
(United Kingdom) Leigh Hetherington
(Iceland) Ingibjörg Hjartardóttir

T. Lepir (P. Pren, N. Vakaričič) – 24:19	1–0
M. Duh (P. Pren, N. Vakaričič) (PP) – 29:22	2–0
P. Pren (M. Duh) – 43:37	3–0
S. Confidenti (T. Lepir) (PP) – 43:37	4–0

4 min
Penalties
8 min
44
Shots
13

27 March 2014; 16:30	Spain	6–3 (1–0, 2–2, 3–1)	Turkey	Laugardalur Arena, Reykjavík; Attendance: 147

Game reference

Carlota Alvarado
Ester García
Goalies
Sera Doğramacı
Referee:
(Sweden) Katarina Timglas
Linesmen:
(Denmark) Loise Larsen
(South Korea) Lee Kyung-Sun

V. Muñoz (A. Ucedo) – 12:52	1–0
	1–1	20:55 – T. Dokur
L. Ortuño (E. Marques) – 28:01	2–1
A. Merino (A. Ucedo) – 29:03	3–1
	3–2	30:57 – B. Turanal (D. Aydoğdu)
	3–3	44:43 – T. Dokur
M. Gurrea (PP) – 46:05	4–3
V. Ibañez (L. Ortuño) (PP) – 53:48	5–3
V. Muñoz (A. Ucedo) – 54:03	6–3

6 min
Penalties
8 min
52
Shots
14

27 March 2014; 20:00	Croatia	3–0 (0–0, 1–0, 2–0)	Iceland	Laugardalur Arena, Reykjavík; Attendance: 157

Game reference

Petra Belobrk
Goalies
Karitas Halldórsdóttir
Referee:
(Finland) Henna Aberg
Linesmen:
(Finland) Satu Auno
(Switzerland) Anne Kuonen

D. Kruselj Posaveć (A. Kadijević) (PP) – 33:39	1–0
D. Kruselj Posaveć (V. Gurka) – 46:28	2–0
T. Delic (M. Smolec, A. Kadijević) – 56:35	3–0

6 min
Penalties
18 min
38
Shots
14

28 March 2014; 13:00	Turkey	1–8 (0–4, 0–2, 1–2)	Slovenia	Laugardalur Arena, Reykjavík; Attendance: 103

Game reference

Sera Doğramacı
Tanay Günay
Goalies
Ines Confidenti
Spela Globocnik
Referee:
(Finland) Henna Aberg
Linesmen:
(United Kingdom) Leigh Hethering
(Switzerland) Anne Kuonen

	0–1	01:34 – S. Confidenti (P. Pren)
	0–2	11:33 – T. Lepir (P. Pren, S. Confidenti)
	0–3	15:50 – P. Beribak (T. Lahajnar)
	0–4	17:32 – S. Confidenti (T. Lepir)
	0–5	26:10 – T. Lahajnar (S. Zimsek)
	0–6	34:30 – T. Lahajnar (E. Dukaric)
	0–7	47:02 – N. Vakaričič (M. Duh) (PP)
	0–8	55:42 – P. Usnik (M. Leben)
T. Dokur (S. Demir) – 57:15	1–8

8 min
Penalties
4 min
9
Shots
56

28 March 2014; 16:30	Belgium	0–8 (0–4, 0–2, 0–2)	Croatia	Laugardalur Arena, Reykjavík; Attendance: 174

Game reference

Kirsten Schonwetter
Jente Vanroy
Goalies
Petra Belobrk
Lana Belič
Referee:
(Sweden) Katarina Timglas
Linesmen:
(Iceland) Ingibjörg Hjartardóttir
(Norway) Cathrine Vestheim

0–1	01:24 – E. Filipec (A. Kadijević)
0–2	05:36 – E. Filipec (M. Klanac)
0–3	13:02 – E. Filipec (D. Kruselj Posaveć) (PP)
0–4	13:54 – A. Širanović (D. Kruselj Posaveć)
0–5	25:34 – A. Kadijević (D. Kruselj Posaveć) (PP)
0–6	37:50 – D. Kruselj Posaveć (N. Matic) (PP)
0–7	50:11 – D. Kruselj Posaveć (A. Širanović) (PP2)
0–8	52:55 – M. Smolec (A. Kadijević, M. Goršič)

14 min
Penalties
2 min
17
Shots
44

28 March 2014; 20:00	Iceland	0–3 (0–1, 0–1, 0–1)	Spain	Laugardalur Arena, Reykjavík; Attendance: 178

Game reference

Karitas Halldórsdóttir
Goalies
Carlota Alvarado
Referee:
(Italy) Deana Cuglietta
Linesmen:
(Denmark) Loise Larsen
(South Korea) Lee Kyung-Sun

0–1	08:57 – M. Gurrea (L. Ortuño)
0–2	30:01 – V. Muñoz (A. Ucedo)
0–3	58:18 – A. Calero (V. Abrisqueta, A. Ucedo) (PP2)

10 min
Penalties
14 min
21
Shots
17

30 March 2014; 13:00	Croatia	5–1 (3–0, 1–1, 1–0)	Turkey	Laugardalur Arena, Reykjavík; Attendance: 123

Game reference

Petra Belobrk
Lana Belič
Goalies
Sera Doğramacı
Referee:
(Austria) Ulrike Winklmayr
Linesmen:
(Iceland) Ingibjörg Hjartardóttir
(South Korea) Lee Kyung-Sun

D. Kruselj Posaveć (E. Filipec) – 06:45	1–0
D. Kruselj Posaveć (E. Filipec) – 18:12	2–0
M. Smolec (D. Kruselj Posaveć) – 19:44	3–0
	3–1	32:07 – B. Taygar (S. Demir, İ. Uygun)
V. Gurka (N. Matic, D. Kruselj Posaveć) – 33:05	4–1
N. Matic (A. Širanović) – 43:55	5–1

4 min
Penalties
4 min
60
Shots
8

30 March 2014; 16:30	Slovenia	5–3 (2–2, 3–0, 0–1)	Spain	Laugardalur Arena, Reykjavík; Attendance: 124

Game reference

Ines Confidenti
Goalies
Carlota Alvarado
Referee:
(Finland) Henna Aberg
Linesmen:
(Switzerland) Anne Kuonen
(Denmark) Loise Larsen

	0–1	07:02 – V. Abrisqueta (L. Abrisqueta) (PP)
	0–2	11:21 – E. Marques (A. Sierra)
I. Kraner (N. Lončar, U. Pazlar) – 16:35	1–2
T. Lahajnar (T. Lepir) – 17:15	2–2
T. Lepir (P. Pren) – 27:53	3–2
I. Kraner (U. Pazlar) – 30:27	4–2
T. Lepir (M. Duh, N. Vakaričič) (PP) – 35:52	5–2
	5–3	50:58 – L. Ortuño (A. Sierra, A. Calero)

6 min
Penalties
6 min
33
Shots
23

30 March 2014; 20:00	Iceland	3–1 (0–0, 2–0, 1–1)	Belgium	Laugardalur Arena, Reykjavík; Attendance: 309

Game reference

Karitas Halldórsdóttir
Goalies
Jente Vanroy
Referee:
(Sweden) Katarina Timglas
Linesmen:
(Finland) Satu Auno
(Norway) Cathrine Vestheim

S. Sigurgeirsdóttir (S. Shantz-Smiley) – 21:20	1–0
L. Sveinsdóttir (J. Gudbjartsdottir) – 30:09	2–0
	2–1	54:55 – S. Morel de Westgaver (F. Bosmans)
J. Gudbjartsdottir (H. Einarsdottir-Thorlacius) – 59:08	3–1

4 min
Penalties
6 min
35
Shots
17

=== Awards and statistics ===
==== Awards ====
- Best players selected by the directorate:
  - Best Goalkeeper: (Turkey) Sera Doğramacı
  - Best Defenseman: (Croatia) Diana Kruselj Posaveć
  - Best Forward: (Slovenia) Pia Pren

Source: IIHF.com

==== Scoring leaders ====
List shows the top skaters sorted by points, then goals.

Player	GP	G	A	Pts	+/−	PIM	POS
(Croatia) Diana Kruselj Posaveć	5	11	7	18	+10	0	D
(Slovenia) Pia Pren	5	3	10	13	+5	0	F
(Slovenia) Tamara Lepir	5	5	4	9	+6	0	F
(Croatia) Ela Filipec	5	4	5	9	+8	8	D
(Croatia) Anja Kadijević	5	3	6	9	+6	0	F
(Spain) Ana Ucedo	5	3	5	8	+7	2	F
(Slovenia) Mojca Duh	5	1	7	8	+6	0	F
(Slovenia) Sara Confidenti	5	5	2	7	+6	2	F
(Spain) Vega Muñoz	5	4	3	7	+6	2	F
(Spain) Lorena Ortuño	5	3	3	6	+6	8	F

GP = Games played; G = Goals; A = Assists; Pts = Points; +/− = Plus/minus; PIM = Penalties in minutes; POS = Position
Source: IIHF.com

==== Leading goaltenders ====
Only the top five goaltenders, based on save percentage, who have played at least 40% of their team's minutes, are included in this list.

Player	TOI	GA	GAA	SA	Sv%	SO
(Slovenia) Ines Confidenti	259:44	8	1.85	94	91.49	1
(Croatia) Petra Belobrk	239:40	7	1.75	81	91.36	1
(Belgium) Jente Vanroy	196:12	13	3.98	139	90.65	0
(Turkey) Sera Doğramacı	283:13	22	4.66	229	90.39	0
(Spain) Carlota Alvarado	279:46	13	2.79	115	88.70	2

TOI = Time on ice (minutes:seconds); SA = Shots against; GA = Goals against; GAA = Goals against average; Sv% = Save percentage; SO = Shutouts
Source: IIHF.com

== Division II Group B Qualification ==
2014 IIHF Women's World Championship Division II B Qualification
Tournament details
- Host country: Mexico
- City: Mexico City
- Venue: 1 (in 1 host city)
- Dates: 19–22 March 2014
- Teams: 4

Tournament statistics
- Games played: 6
- Goals scored: 36 (6 per game)
- Attendance: 300 (50 per game)

The Division II Group B Qualification tournament was played in Mexico City, Mexico, from 19 to 22 March 2014.

The winners of this tournament were promoted to the Division II Group B for the 2015 championship.

=== Participating teams ===
Team	Qualification
South Africa	placed 6th in Division II B last year and were relegated
Bulgaria	placed 2nd in Division II B Q last year
Mexico	hosts; first participation in World Championship
Hong Kong	first participation in World Championship

=== Final standings ===
Pos	Team	Pld	W	OTW	OTL	L	GF	GA	GD	Pts	Promotion
1	Mexico (H)	3	3	0	0	0	18	2	+16	9	Promoted to the 2015 Division II B
2	South Africa	3	1	1	0	1	7	8	−1	5	
3	Bulgaria	3	1	0	1	1	7	16	−9	4	
4	Hong Kong	3	0	0	0	3	4	10	−6	0	

Source: IIHF
(H) Host

=== Match results ===
All times are local (Central Zone – UTC−6).

19 March 2014; 16:30	Hong Kong	2–5 (1–1, 1–3, 0–1)	South Africa	Mexico City Ice Dome, Mexico City; Attendance: 50

Game reference

Lee Jenny Kai-Chin
Goalies
Sandra McClurg
Referee:
(Canada) Lacey Senuk
Linesmen:
(Canada) Danielle McGurry
(United States) Jill Salvo

Kong C. (Li A.) – 11:10	1–0
	1–1	15:42 – B. Birrell
Ip E. (Kong C., Li A.) (PP) – 23:11	2–1
	2–2	28:43 – D. Rhode (C. Schuurman, D. Verwey)
	2–3	31:35 – D. Oxenham (C. Schuurman)
	2–4	37:51 – C. Schuurman (D. Verwey)
	2–5	47:52 – D. Rhode (D. Oxenham)

14 min
Penalties
14 min
22
Shots
33

19 March 2014; 19:30	Bulgaria	2–12 (1–5, 1–2, 0–5)	Mexico	Mexico City Ice Dome, Mexico City; Attendance: 50

Game reference

Monika Kitova
Vesela Krasteva
Goalies
Mónica Renteria
Referee:
(United States) Jamie Huntley
Linesmen:
(United States) Jamie Fenstermacher
(Canada) Justine Todd

	0–1	03:12 – F. Cardenas (M. Larios, T. Escobedo)
S. Stoyanova (M. Zareva, L. Bobeva) – 03:31	1–1
	1–2	09:47 – F. Cardenas (R. Hurtado)
	1–3	10:28 – R. Hurtado (B. González)
	1–4	11:25 – R. Hurtado (C. Tellez, F. Hernández) (PP)
	1–5	14:23 – M. Cruz (SH)
T. Lisichkova (PP) – 21:31	2–5
	2–6	24:01 – F. Cardenas (A. Hernández, T. Colas)
	2–7	36:17 – M. Chávez (M. Arroyo, T. Álvarez) (PP)
	2–8	43:47 – C. Tellez (M. Arroyo, F. Hernández) (PP)
	2–9	48:16 – C. Tellez (M. Chávez) (PP)
	2–10	50:27 – C. Tellez (M. Arroyo, F. Hernández) (PP2)
	2–11	57:25 – C. Tellez (M. Chávez)
	2–12	57:54 – T. Álvarez (C. Tellez, M. Chávez)

33 min
Penalties
10 min
8
Shots
38

21 March 2014; 16:30	Bulgaria	4–2 (1–0, 2–1, 1–1)	Hong Kong	Mexico City Ice Dome, Mexico City; Attendance: 50

Game reference

Vesela Krasteva
Goalies
Wong Ying Chi Virginia
Referee:
(Canada) Lisa Grison
Linesmen:
(United States) Jamie Fenstermacher
(Canada) Danielle McGurry

M. Zareva (L. Bobeva) – 08:51	1–0
M. Zareva – 32:06 (PP)	2–0
A. Peneva (E. Todorova, T. Petkova) – 32:38	3–0
	3–1	39:56 – Ip E.
T. Lisichkova (M. Zareva) – 44:22	4–1
	4–2	54:48 – Li A. (Ip E.)

34 min
Penalties
12 min
39
Shots
48

21 March 2014; 19:30	South Africa	0–5 (0–4, 0–1, 0–0)	Mexico	Mexico City Ice Dome, Mexico City; Attendance: 50

Game reference

Sandra McClurg
Goalies
Monica Renteria
Referee:
(Canada) Lacey Senuk
Linesmen:
(United States) Jill Salvo
(Canada) Justine Todd

0–1	04:29 – C. Tellez (SH)
0–2	09:36 – F. Hernández (T. Escobedo)
0–3	13:02 – B. González (M. Chávez, T. Escobedo) (PP)
0–4	13:22 – M. Chávez (T. Álvarez, C. Tellez)
0–5	31:33 – B. González (M. Cruz, F. Cardenas) (PP)

24 min
Penalties
20 min
19
Shots
32

22 March 2014; 16:30	South Africa	2–1 OT (0–0, 1–1, 0–0) (OT 1–0)	Bulgaria	Mexico City Ice Dome, Mexico City; Attendance: 50

Game reference

Sandra McClurg
Goalies
Vesela Krasteva
Referee:
(United States) Jamie Huntley
Linesmen:
(United States) Jamie Fenstermacher
(United States) Jill Salvo

R. Cronje (D. Oxenham, J. Skinner) (PP) – 29:36	1–0
	1–1	34:15 – M. Zareva (L. Bobeva, M. Terzieva)
D. Oxenham (D. Verwey) (SH) – 61:48	2–1

14 min
Penalties
10 min
53
Shots
28

22 March 2014; 19:30	Mexico	1–0 (1–0, 0–0, 0–0)	Hong Kong	Mexico City Ice Dome, Mexico City; Attendance: 50

Game reference
Maria Meza	Goalies	Wong Ying Chi Virginia	Referee: (Canada) Lisa Grison; Linesmen: (Canada) Danielle McGurry (Canada) Justine Todd
R. Hurtado (M. Arroyo, T. Colas) – 13:32 / 1–0			Referee: (Canada) Lisa Grison; Linesmen: (Canada) Danielle McGurry (Canada) Justine Todd
14 min	Penalties	12 min	Referee: (Canada) Lisa Grison; Linesmen: (Canada) Danielle McGurry (Canada) Justine Todd
48	Shots	7	Referee: (Canada) Lisa Grison; Linesmen: (Canada) Danielle McGurry (Canada) Justine Todd
