= Ireland national hockey team =

Ireland national hockey team may refer to:

- Ireland men's national field hockey team
- Ireland women's national field hockey team
- Ireland men's national ice hockey team
- Ireland women's national ice hockey team
