= Ireland women's national ice hockey team =

Ireland
- Association: Irish Ice Hockey Association
- Head coach: Aaron Guli
- Assistants: Paul Cummins, Scott Muir
- Team colors
- IIHF code: IRL

Ranking
- Current IIHF: NR (3 June 2026)
- Highest IIHF: 35 (first in 2013)
- Lowest IIHF: 38 (2016)

First international
- Poland 23–0 Ireland (Sofia, Bulgaria; 14 March 2011)

Biggest win
- Ireland 12–0 Andorra (Kuwait City, Kuwait; 12 November 2022)

Biggest defeat
- Poland 23–0 Ireland (Sofia, Bulgaria; 14 March 2011)

IIHF World Women's Championships
- Appearances: 2 (first in 2011)
- Best result: 35th (2011, 2013)

International record (W–L–T)
- 2–9–0

The Ireland women's national ice hockey team is the women's national ice hockey team of the Republic of Ireland. The team is controlled by the Irish Ice Hockey Association, a member of the International Ice Hockey Federation. Until the Dundalk Ice Dome reopens they do not meet minimum IIHF standards for participation.

== History ==
Ireland played its first game in 2011 during the 2011 Women's World Ice Hockey Championships – Division V tournament held in Sofia, Bulgaria. They competed against Bulgaria, Poland, Spain, and Turkey. Their first game of the tournament was against Poland which they went on to lose 23–0, which would also be their largest recorded loss. Ireland lost all of the other three games of the tournament, finishing last in the group. The following year Ireland competed in the 2013 IIHF Women's World Championship Division II Group B Qualification tournament against Bulgaria and Turkey. Ireland lost both of its games and failed to qualify for the 2014 IIHF Women's World Championship Division II Group B tournament.

== International competitions ==
=== World Championship ===
- 2011 IIHF Women's World Championships. Finish: 5th in Division V (35th overall)
- 2013 IIHF Women's World Championships. Finish: 3rd in Division II Group B Qualification (35th overall)

=== IIHF Women's Development Cup ===
Year	Host	Result	Pld	W	T	L
2022	Kuwait City	5th place	5	2	0	3
Total		1/1	5	2	0	3

The team also competed in the following year and came 4th.

== Roster ==
September 2026

#	Name	Pos	Club
1	Aoife McGee	G	(United States) Dallas Stars Elite
2	Maggie Conroy	D	Unnatached
4	Tracey Barritt	F	(Republic of Ireland) Northern Ireland Tridents
6	Alexandra Lawlor	F	Unnatached
7	Sinead Jennings	F	(United Kingdom) Haringey Greyhounds
12	Lilly McPherson	D	(Republic of Ireland) Kilkenny Storm
14	Ella Petroski	F	(United States) Little Caesers
20	Dorinda Sinton	F	Retired
30	Saoirse Lawlor	G	(Canada) Greater Vancouver Comets
33	Bonnie Bashford	F	(United Kingdom) Caledonia Steel Queen Bees
44	Lara O'Héinigh	F	(France) Spartiates de Marseille
61	Aundrea Hubble	D	(Republic of Ireland) Dublin Buccaneers
66	Caitlin Gavriel	D	(United Kingdom) Milton Keynes Falcons
79	Aoife Taylor	F	(United States) Texas Warriors
88	Elisa Petroski	D	(United States) Michigan State Spartans
95	Hallie Cummins	D	(Republic of Ireland) Kilkenny Storm

== All-time Record against other nations ==
As of 14 September 2011

Team	GP	W	T	L	GF	GA
Spain	1	0	0	1	0	14
Poland	1	0	0	1	0	23
Bulgaria	2	0	0	2	1	9
Turkey	2	0	0	2	1	10

== See also ==
- Ireland men's national ice hockey team
