= 2011 IIHF Women's World Championship Division V =

Tournament details
- Host country: Bulgaria
- City: Sofia
- Venue: 1 (in 1 host city)
- Dates: 14–19 March 2011
- Teams: 5

The 2011 IIHF Women's World Championship Division V was an international ice hockey tournament organized by the International Ice Hockey Federation. It was played in Sofia, Bulgaria, from 14 to 19 March 2011. Division V represented the sixth tier of the IIHF Women's World Championship.

As the winner of this tournament, Poland was promoted to Division IV (renamed II B) for the 2012 championships. Additionally Spain was elevated because of some nations' withdrawals. Bulgaria, Turkey and Ireland resumed play in 2013 in Division II B Qualification.

== Participating teams ==
Team	Qualification
Turkey	placed 6th in 2008 Division IV and were relegated
Bulgaria	hosts; first participation in World Championship
Ireland	first participation in World Championship
Poland	first participation in World Championship
Spain	first participation in World Championship

== Final standings ==
Pos	Team	Pld	W	OTW	OTL	L	GF	GA	GD	Pts	Promotion or relegation
1	Poland	4	3	1	0	0	61	4	+57	11	Promoted to the 2012 Division II B
2	Spain	4	3	0	1	0	32	5	+27	10	Promoted to the 2012 Division II B
3	Bulgaria (H)	4	2	0	0	2	5	27	−22	6	Did not participate in 2012
4	Turkey	4	1	0	0	3	4	23	−19	3	Did not participate in 2012
5	Ireland	4	0	0	0	4	0	43	−43	0	Did not participate in 2012

Source: IIHF
(H) Host

== Match results ==
All times are local (Eastern European Time – UTC+2).

14 March 2011; 14:30	Poland	23–0 (7–0, 9–0, 7–0)	Ireland	Winter Sports Palace

Game reference

14 March 2011; 18:30	Bulgaria	2–1 (1–1, 0–0, 1–0)	Turkey	Winter Sports Palace

Game reference

15 March 2011; 14:30	Turkey	0–7 (0–1, 0–1, 0–5)	Spain	Winter Sports Palace

Game reference

15 March 2011; 18:00	Poland	19–0 (5–0, 8–0, 6–0)	Bulgaria	Winter Sports Palace

Game reference

16 March 2011; 14:30	Ireland	0–3 (0–3, 0–0, 0–0)	Turkey	Winter Sports Palace

Game reference

16 March 2011; 18:00	Bulgaria	0–7 (0–1, 0–3, 0–3)	Spain	Winter Sports Palace

Game reference

18 March 2011; 14:30	Spain	4–5 OT (3–1, 1–3, 0–0) (0–1)	Poland	Winter Sports Palace

Game reference

18 March 2011; 18:00	Ireland	0–3 (0–2, 0–1, 0–0)	Bulgaria	Winter Sports Palace

Game reference

19 March 2011; 14:30	Spain	14–0 (8–0, 4–0, 2–0)	Ireland	Winter Sports Palace

Game reference

19 March 2011; 18:00	Turkey	0–14 (0–4, 0–5, 0–5)	Poland	Winter Sports Palace

Game reference

== Statistics ==
=== Scoring leaders ===
Pos	Player	Country	GP	G	A	Pts	+/−	PIM
1	Magdalena Szynal	Poland	4	10	10	20	+22	6
2	Marta Bigos	Poland	4	9	5	14	+26	2
3	Karolina Pozniewska	Poland	4	7	6	13	+15	4
4	Ewelina Czarnecka	Poland	4	6	6	12	+20	2
5	Aleksandra Berecka	Poland	4	6	5	11	+19	0
6	Maria Gurrea	Spain	4	6	4	10	+8	4
7	Ana Ucedo	Spain	4	1	9	10	+6	4
8	Vanesa Abrisqueta	Spain	4	6	3	9	+9	0
9	Katarzyna Frackowiak	Poland	4	5	4	9	+9	0
10	Ainhoa Merino	Spain	4	4	3	7	+6	0

GP = Games played; G = Goals; A = Assists; Pts = Points; +/− = Plus–minus; PIM = Penalties In Minutes

=== Goaltending leaders ===
(minimum 40% team's total ice time)

Pos	Player	Country	TOI	GA	GAA	Sv%	SO
1	Malgorzata Burda	Poland	144:12	2	0.83	92.31	0
2	Carlota Alvarado	Spain	158:38	5	1.97	90.20	1
3	Seanna Conway	Ireland	150:58	18	7.15	90.06	0
4	Karnelia Ivanova	Bulgaria	240:00	27	6.75	90.04	1
5	Joanna Katarzynska-Goj	Poland	97:16	2	1.23	89.47	0

TOI = Time on ice (minutes:seconds); GA = Goals against; GAA = Goals against average; Sv% = Save percentage; SO = Shutouts

=== Directorate Awards ===
- Goaltender: Karnelia Ivanova, Bulgaria
- Defenseman: Vanesa Abrisqueta, Spain
- Forward: Karolina Pozniewska, Poland
