= 2017 World Ice Hockey Championships =

2017 World Ice Hockey Championships may refer to:

- 2017 Men's World Ice Hockey Championships
- 2017 Women's World Ice Hockey Championships
- 2017 World Junior Ice Hockey Championships
- 2017 IIHF World U18 Championships
