= 2010 IIHF Women's Challenge Cup of Asia =

Inaugural Women's CCoA ice hockey tournament

Tournament details
- Host country: China
- Venue: 1 (in 1 host city)
- Dates: April 10 – April 14
- Teams: 4

Final positions
- Champions: China 1 (1st title)
- Runners-up: Japan
- Third place: North Korea
- Fourth place: China 2

Tournament statistics
- Games played: 8

The 2010 IIHF Women's Challenge Cup of Asia was the inaugural tournament of the IIHF Women's Challenge Cup of Asia (CCoA). It was hosted in Shanghai from 10 April to 14 April and was organized and managed by the International Ice Hockey Federation (IIHF). Games were played at the Taipei Arena in Shanghai University City International Ice Hockey Arena. China 1 won the tournament, winning all of its five games and defeating Japan in the final 2–1.

== Standings ==
Pos	Team	Pld	W	D	L	GF	GA	GD	Pts
1	China 1	3	3	0	0	29	4	+25	9
2	Japan	3	2	0	1	12	12	0	6
3	North Korea	3	1	0	2	11	16	−5	3
4	China 2	3	0	0	3	6	26	−20	0

== Fixtures ==
All times local.

April 10, 2010; 15:00	Japan	7 – 2	China 2	International Ice Hockey Arena

Game reference

April 10, 2010; 19:30	China 1	8 – 3	North Korea	International Ice Hockey Arena

Game reference

April 11, 2010; 15:00	North Korea	6 – 3	China 2	International Ice Hockey Arena

Game reference

April 11, 2010; 19:30	China 1	8 – 0	Japan	International Ice Hockey Arena

Game reference

April 13, 2010; 15:00	North Korea	2 – 5	Japan	International Ice Hockey Arena

Game reference

April 13, 2010; 19:30	China 1	13 – 1	China 2	International Ice Hockey Arena

Game reference

=== Bronze medal game ===
April 14, 2010; 15:00	North Korea	3 – 0	China 2	International Ice Hockey Arena

Game reference

=== Gold medal game ===
April 14, 2010; 19:30	China 1	2 – 1	Japan	International Ice Hockey Arena

Game reference
