= 2021 IIHF Women's World Championship Division III =

Ice hockey tournament

Tournament details
- Host country: Lithuania
- Venue: 1 (in 1 host city)
- Dates: 15–21 March 2021 (cancelled)
- Teams: 8

The 2021 IIHF Women's World Championship Division III was scheduled to be an international ice hockey tournament organized by the International Ice Hockey Federation. The tournament would have been held in Kaunas, Lithuania, from 15 to 21 March 2021.

The tournament was cancelled on 18 November 2020 due to the COVID-19 pandemic.

== Planned participating teams ==
Team	Qualification
Ukraine	Placed 6th in Division II B last year and were relegated.
Belgium	Placed 2nd in Division III last year.
Romania	Placed 3rd in Division III last year.
Bulgaria	Placed 4th in Division III last year.
Lithuania	Hosts; placed 5th in Division III last year.
Hong Kong	Placed 6th in Division III last year.
Estonia	Last participated in 2008.
Bosnia and Herzegovina	First time participating in tournament.

== Standings ==
Pos	Team	Pld	W	OTW	OTL	L	GF	GA	GD	Pts
1	Ukraine	0	0	0	0	0	0	0	0	0
2	Belgium	0	0	0	0	0	0	0	0	0
3	Romania	0	0	0	0	0	0	0	0	0
4	Bulgaria	0	0	0	0	0	0	0	0	0
5	Lithuania (H)	0	0	0	0	0	0	0	0	0
6	Hong Kong	0	0	0	0	0	0	0	0	0
7	Estonia	0	0	0	0	0	0	0	0	0
8	Bosnia and Herzegovina	0	0	0	0	0	0	0	0	0

(H) Host
