= Moscow Tournament =

Tournament details
- Host country: Russia
- City: Moscow
- Dates: October 7 - October 9
- Teams: 4

Final positions
- Champions: Finland

Tournament statistics
- Games played: 6
- Goals scored: 75 (12.5 per game)

The Moscow Tournament was an international women's ice hockey tournament held from October 7–9, 1994 in Moscow, Russia. The tournament was won by Finland, which won all three games by at least 10 goals without giving up a goal the entire tournament.

== Tournament ==
=== Results ===
Finland	31-0 (13-0, 8-0, 10-0)	Ukraine	Moscow

Russia	4-1 (1-0, 1-1, 2-0)	Latvia	Moscow

Russia	7-1 (1-1, 3-0, 3-0)	Ukraine	Moscow

Finland	12-0 (6-0, 2-0, 4-0)	Latvia	Moscow

Latvia	8-1 (3-0, 3-1, 2-0)	Ukraine	Moscow

Russia	0-10 (3-0, 3-1, 2-0)	Finland	Moscow

=== Final Table ===
Pl.	Team	GP	W	T	L	Goals	Pts
1.	Finland	3	3	0	0	53:0	6
2.	Russia	3	2	0	1	11:12	4
3.	Latvia	3	1	0	2	9:17	2
4.	Ukraine	3	0	0	3	2:46	0
