= Ice Hockey Association of the DPR Korea =

Ice hockey governing body in North Korea

North Korea
- Sport: Ice Hockey
- Affiliation date: August 8, 1963
- Headquarters: P.O. Box 56 Kumsongdong 2 Mangyongdae District, Pyongyang
- President: Pak Song Nam

DPR Korea
- Association name: Ice Hockey Association of the DPR Korea
- IIHF Code: PRK
- IIHF membership: August 8, 1963
- President: Pak Song Nam
- IIHF men's ranking: 43
- IIHF women's ranking: 21

The Ice Hockey Association of the DPR Korea (Korean: 조선아이스하키협회) is the governing body of ice hockey in North Korea led by Kim Kyong Jun as of 2026. It was founded in 1955, and has been facilitating international travel for IIHF tournaments since 2000s.

Its name is sometimes confusingly translated as "Korea Ice Hockey Association", the same translation as its South Korean counterpart.

On several occasions, it has collaborated with Korea Ice Hockey Association to form cross-Korea teams but not without controversies. Since 2003, KIHA has provided ice hockey equipment to its North Korean counterpart.

== See also ==
- North Korea men's national ice hockey team
- North Korea women's national ice hockey team
