= 2001 Women's World Ice Hockey Championships (Lower Divisions) =

2001 IIHF World Women's Championship
Division I

Tournament details
- Host country: France
- Venue(s): Briançon, France (in 1 host city)
- Dates: March 20 - March 25
- Teams: 8

Final positions
- Champions: Switzerland (1st title)

Tournament statistics
- Games played: 20
- Goals scored: 87 (4.35 per game)
- Attendance: 14,527 (726 per game)
- Scoring leader: (Czech Republic) Zuzana Kralova (5+3=8PTS)

The 2001 IIHF World Women's Championships Division I (formerly Pool 'B') were held between March 20–25, 2001 in the city of Briançon, France. Switzerland won the tournament with a narrow 2–1 victory over Japan in the final.

For the third consecutive year the number of participants grew, with this year's third tier having ten nations in two groups. The two groups played independent of each other in Bucharest, Romania and Maribor, Slovenia. Initially the two group winners, Slovakia and the Netherlands, were promoted to Division I with Denmark and Norway being relegated to Division I Qualification. However, before the 2003 season was played the formation of the divisions were changed.

The women's tiers were reformatted for 2003, so there would be a top level of eight teams, and Divisions I, II, III each with 6 teams. The winner of the 2001 Division I tournament was promoted to the 2003 World Championship, replacing the nation relegated from there. The relegated team and the next five placed nations formed Division I for 2003. The bottom two teams from 2001 Division I along with the top four nations from the two qualifying tournaments formed the 2003 Division II. All remaining participants proceeded to the 2003 Division III.

== World Championship Division I ==
The eight participating teams were divided up into two seeded groups as below. The teams played each other once in a single round robin format. The top two teams from the group proceeded to the Final Round, while the remaining teams played in the consolation round. In the placing rounds, the first place teams played each other for the promotion, while the fourth place teams were relegated.

=== First round ===
==== Group A ====
Pos	Team	Pld	W	D	L	GF	GA	GD	Pts	Qualification or relegation
1	Japan	3	1	2	0	10	8	+2	4	Advanced to Final
2	North Korea	3	1	1	1	10	14	−4	3	
3	France	3	1	1	1	7	8	−1	3	
4	Denmark	3	1	0	2	10	7	+3	2	Relegated to Division II

Source: IIHF

==== Results ====
All times local

March 20, 2001; 5:30pm	Denmark	8 – 2 (3 - 0, 1 - 2, 4 - 0)	North Korea	Parc 1326; Attendance: 451

March 20, 2001; 8:30pm	France	3 – 3 (1 - 2, 2 - 0, 0 - 1)	Japan	Parc 1326; Attendance: 1812

March 21, 2001; 4:30pm	Japan	4 – 4 (0 - 0, 4 - 1, 0 - 3)	North Korea	Parc 1326; Attendance: 409

March 21, 2001; 8:00pm	Denmark	1 – 2 (0 - 0, 1 - 2, 0 - 0)	France	Parc 1326; Attendance: 1592

March 23, 2001; 11:30am	Japan	3 – 1 (1 - 0, 0 - 0, 2 - 1)	Denmark	Parc 1326; Attendance: 413

March 23, 2001; 2:30pm	North Korea	4 – 2 (1 - 1, 2 - 0, 1 - 1)	France	Parc 1326; Attendance: 1867

==== Group B ====
Pos	Team	Pld	W	D	L	GF	GA	GD	Pts	Qualification or relegation
1	Switzerland	3	3	0	0	16	2	+14	6	Advanced to Final
2	Czech Republic	3	1	1	1	9	7	+2	3	
3	Latvia	3	1	1	1	6	8	−2	3	
4	Norway	3	0	0	3	2	16	−14	0	Relegated to Division II

Source: IIHF

==== Results ====
All times local

March 20, 2001; 11:00pm	Latvia	0 – 4 (0 - 1, 0 - 2, 0 - 1)	Switzerland	Parc 1326; Attendance: 300

March 20, 2001; 4:30pm	Norway	0 – 5 (0 - 1, 0 - 2, 0 - 2)	Czech Republic	Parc 1326; Attendance: 427

March 22, 2001; 4:30pm	Norway	1 – 3 (0 - 2, 0 - 0, 1 - 1)	Latvia	Parc 1326; Attendance: 513

March 22, 2001; 8:00pm	Switzerland	4 – 1 (2 - 0, 1 - 0, 1 - 1)	Czech Republic	Parc 1326; Attendance: 946

March 23, 2001; 5:30pm	Czech Republic	3 – 3 (1 - 1, 0 - 2, 2 - 0)	Latvia	Parc 1326; Attendance: 476

March 23, 2001; 8:00pm	Switzerland	8 – 1 (6 - 1, 0 - 0, 2 - 0)	Norway	Parc 1326; Attendance: 1337

=== Playoff round ===
==== Match for seventh place ====
March 25, 2001; 11:30am	Denmark	2 – 4 (1 - 2, 1 - 0, 0 - 2)	Norway	Parc 1326; Attendance: 319

==== Match for fifth place ====
March 25, 2001; 2:30pm	Latvia	1 – 2 (0 - 1, 1 - 1, 0 - 0)	France	Parc 1326; Attendance: 1555

==== Match for third place ====
March 25, 2001; 5:30pm	Czech Republic	3 – 2 (0 - 1, 1 - 0, 1 - 1, 0 - 0, 1 - 0)	North Korea	Parc 1326; Attendance: 1030

==== Final ====
March 25, 2001; 8:30pm	Switzerland	2 – 1 (2 - 0, 0 - 1, 0 - 0)	Japan	Parc 1326; Attendance: 1980

=== Scoring leaders ===
Player	GP	G	A	Pts	PIM	+/-
(Czech Republic) Zuzana Kralova	4	5	3	8	0	1
(Denmark) Anne-Sofie Lund	4	6	0	6	2	2
(Latvia) Iveta Koka	4	4	2	6	0	3
(Switzerland) Sandrine Ray	4	4	2	6	6	5
(Switzerland) Kathrin Lehmann	4	3	3	5	0	6
(Switzerland) Jeanette Marty	4	1	4	5	8	4
(Czech Republic) Simona Studentova	4	3	1	4	6	1
(North Korea) Han Song Nyo	4	3	1	4	8	0
(Latvia) Inese Geca-Miljone	4	2	2	4	4	3
(Switzerland) Prisca Mosimann	4	2	2	4	4	5
(France) Sophie Serre	4	2	2	4	4	–1

=== Goaltending leaders ===
Player	Mins	GA	SOG	GAA	SV%
(Switzerland) Riitta Schaeublin	188:13	2	90	0.64	97.78
(Latvia) Lolita Andrisevska	240:00	10	207	2.50	95.17
(Czech Republic) Radka Lhotska	208:35	7	112	2.01	93.75
(Norway) Hege Moe	100:00	4	62	2.40	93.55
(Denmark) Birgitte Andersen	239:16	11	169	2.76	93.49

=== Champions ===
2001 IIHF World Women Championship Pool B winners

Switzerland
1st title

=== Final standings ===
Rk.	Team	Notes
1st place, gold medalist(s)	Switzerland	Promoted to the 2003 World Championships
2nd place, silver medalist(s)	Japan	
3rd place, bronze medalist(s)	Czech Republic	
4.	North Korea	
5.	France	
6.	Latvia	
7.	Norway	Relegated to the 2003 World Championships Division II
8.	Denmark	Relegated to the 2003 World Championships Division II

== 2003 Division I Qualification ==
At the time these tournaments were played it was understood that the winner of each group would be promoted to Division I for 2003. With the reorganization of the lower tiers into smaller groups the winners and second-place finishers of both tournaments were sent to Division II, with the remaining six nations comprising Division III.

=== Group A ===
Played in Bucharest Romania March 5–11, 2001.

Pos	Team	Pld	W	D	L	GF	GA	GD	Pts
1	Netherlands	4	4	0	0	27	4	+23	8
2	Italy	4	3	0	1	33	4	+29	6
3	Belgium	4	2	0	2	12	16	−4	4
4	South Africa	4	1	0	3	12	20	−8	2
5	Romania	4	0	0	4	2	42	−40	0

Source: IIHF

Netherlands and Italy qualified in 2003 World Championship Division II

05 March 2001	South Africa	3-4 (1-1,2-2,0-1)	Belgium

05 March 2001	Romania	1-14 (1-7,0-2,0-5)	Netherlands

06 March 2001	Italy	9-1 (4-0,4-1,1-0)	South Africa

06 March 2001	Romania	0-7 (0-3,0-4,0-0)	Belgium

08 March 2001	Romania	0-15 (0-4,0-8,0-3)	Italy

08 March 2001	Belgium	0-5 (0-1,0-2,0-2)	Netherlands

09 March 2001	Netherlands	2-1 (2-0,0-1,0-0)	Italy

09 March 2001	Romania	1-6 (1-1,0-4,0-1)	South Africa

11 March 2001	Netherlands	6-2 (2-0,2-1,2-1)	South Africa

11 March 2001	Italy	8-1 (1-1,3-0,4-0)	Belgium

=== Scoring leaders ===
Player	GP	G	A	Pts	PIM	+/-
(Netherlands) Maria Pepels	4	8	4	12	4	10
(South Africa) Nadia Kemp	4	9	1	10	2	–3
(Italy) Federica Zandegiacomo	4	8	0	8	0	8
(Italy) Sabrian Viel	4	4	4	8	0	10
(Italy) Evelyn Bazzanella	4	2	5	7	4	5
(Italy) Waltraud Kaser	4	4	2	6	4	6
(Netherlands) Nancy Van Der Linden	4	4	2	6	22	9
(Belgium) Sara Verpoest	4	2	4	6	6	3
(Netherlands) Myrthe Martens	4	4	1	5	2	9
(Italy) Barbara Da Rold	4	4	1	5	4	8

=== Goaltending leaders ===
Player	Mins	GA	SOG	GAA	SV%
(Netherlands) Helena Kysela	150:56	2	23	0.80	91.30
(Italy) Michaela Mair	120:00	2	22	1.00	90.91
(Belgium) Ilse Vangheel	120:00	8	70	4.00	88.57
(Italy) Ngoc Lam Kim	120:00	2	16	1.00	87.50
(South Africa) Jennifer Sharland	104:01	11	66	6.35	83.33

=== Group B ===
Played in Maribor Slovenia March 20–25, 2001.

Pos	Team	Pld	W	D	L	GF	GA	GD	Pts
1	Slovakia	4	4	0	0	48	2	+46	8
2	Great Britain	4	3	0	1	29	6	+23	6
3	Australia	4	2	0	2	13	15	−2	4
4	Hungary	4	1	0	3	7	28	−21	2
5	Slovenia	4	0	0	4	3	50	−47	0

Source: IIHF

Slovakia and Great Britain qualified in 2003 World Championship Division II

20 March 2001	Hungary	0-12 (0-3,0-5,0-4)	Slovakia

20 March 2001	Slovenia	0-12 (0-5,0-5,0-2)	Great Britain

21 March 2001	Slovenia	2-7 (1-3,1-1,0-3)	Australia

21 March 2001	Great Britain	12-0 (4-0,5-0,3-0)	Hungary

22 March 2001	Slovakia	9-1 (5-1,3-0,1-0)	Australia

23 March 2001	Slovenia	0-23 (0-5,0-8,0-10)	Slovakia

24 March 2001	Great Britain	4-2 (0-1,2-0,2-1)	Australia

24 March 2001	Slovenia	1-7 (0-3,0-3,1-1)	Hungary

25 March 2001	Australia	3-0 (0-0,3-0,0-0)	Hungary

25 March 2001	Slovakia	4-1 (1-0,1-0,2-1)	Great Britain

=== Scoring leaders ===
Player	GP	G	A	Pts	PIM	+/-
(Slovakia) Michaela Durcanska	4	5	9	14	4	16
(Slovakia) Katarina Buocikova	4	5	6	11	0	11
(Slovakia) Bozena Kevesova	4	8	2	10	2	14
(Slovakia) Petra Babiakova	4	6	3	9	2	12
(Slovakia) Zuzana Moravčíková	4	5	4	9	0	14
(United Kingdom) Michelle Smith	4	6	2	8	4	9
(United Kingdom) Louise Wheeler	4	4	4	8	2	6
(Slovakia) Lucia Petrovicova	4	2	6	8	2	19
(Slovakia) Natalia Babonyova	4	4	3	7	0	9
(Australia) Melissa Rulli	4	4	2	6	8	1

=== Goaltending leaders ===
Player	Mins	GA	SOG	GAA	SV%
(Slovakia) Jana Tistanova	150:38	1	32	0.40	96.88
(United Kingdom) Amy Johnson	120:00	2	32	1.00	93.75
(United Kingdom) Vicky Robbins	120:00	4	54	2.00	91.11
(Australia) Ashliegh Sluga	223:20	10	93	2.69	89.25
(Hungary) Monika Kiskartali	169:55	17	118	6.00	85.59
