= Heidi Caldart =

Italian ice hockey player

Personal information
- Nationality: Italian
- Born: 19 October 1983 (age 41); Feltre, Italy

Sport
- Sport: Ice hockey

Heidi Caldart (born 19 October 1983) is an Italian ice hockey player. She competed in the women's tournament at the 2006 Winter Olympics.
