= 2020 IIHF Women's World Championship Division II =

Women's Worlds Championship of 2020

Tournament details
- Host countries: Spain; Iceland
- Venues: 2 (in 2 host cities)
- Dates: 29 March – 4 April 2020 (cancelled); 23–29 February 2020
- Teams: 12

The 2020 IIHF Women's World Championship Division II was scheduled to be two international ice hockey tournaments organized by the International Ice Hockey Federation, but only one tournament was played.

The Division II Group A tournament would have been played in Granada, Spain, from 29 March to 4 April 2020. On 2 March 2020, this tournament was cancelled due to the COVID-19 pandemic. The Division II Group B tournament was played in Akureyri, Iceland, from 23 to 29 February 2020.

Australia won the Division II Group B tournament and were originally promoted, while Ukraine were relegated. However, that promotion was rescinded due to the COVID-19 pandemic.

== Division II Group A ==
2020 IIHF Women's World Championship Division II A

Tournament details
- Host country: Spain
- Venue: 1 (in 1 host city)
- Dates: 29 March – 4 April 2020 (cancelled)
- Teams: 6

Official website
- www.iihf.com

=== Participating teams ===
Team	Qualification
Latvia	Placed 6th in Division I B previous year and were relegated.
Great Britain	Placed 2nd in Division II A previous year.
Spain	Hosts; placed 3rd in Division II A previous year.
Mexico	Placed 4th in Division II A previous year.
North Korea	Placed 5th in Division II A previous year.
Chinese Taipei	Placed 1st in Division II B previous year and were promoted.

=== Match officials ===
Four referees and seven linesmen are selected for the tournament.

Referees	Linesmen
(Finland) Sini Kauhanen; (Latvia) Agnese Kārkliņa; (Norway) Elise Harbitz-Rasmussen; (United States) Jestina Vichorek	(Canada) Marie-Pierre Jalbert; (Denmark) Loise Lybak Larsen; (Hong Kong) Wong Tsui Yi; (Japan) Yuka Tochigi; (Slovenia) Katja Mrak; (Spain) Alba Calero; (United States) Erika Greenen

=== Standings ===
Pos	Team	Pld	W	OTW	OTL	L	GF	GA	GD	Pts
1	Latvia	0	0	0	0	0	0	0	0	0
2	Great Britain	0	0	0	0	0	0	0	0	0
3	Spain (H)	0	0	0	0	0	0	0	0	0
4	Mexico	0	0	0	0	0	0	0	0	0
5	North Korea	0	0	0	0	0	0	0	0	0
6	Chinese Taipei	0	0	0	0	0	0	0	0	0

Source: IIHF
(H) Host

=== Schedule ===
All times are local (Central European Summer Time – UTC+2).

29 March 2020; 13:00	Chinese Taipei	Cancelled	Mexico	Pabellón de Hielo de Jaca, Jaca

29 March 2020; 16:30	Great Britain	Cancelled	North Korea	Pabellón de Hielo de Jaca, Jaca

29 March 2020; 20:00	Spain	Cancelled	Latvia	Pabellón de Hielo de Jaca, Jaca

30 March 2020; 13:00	North Korea	Cancelled	Chinese Taipei	Pabellón de Hielo de Jaca, Jaca

30 March 2020; 16:30	Latvia	Cancelled	Mexico	Pabellón de Hielo de Jaca, Jaca

30 March 2020; 20:00	Great Britain	Cancelled	Spain	Pabellón de Hielo de Jaca, Jaca

1 April 2020; 13:00	Latvia	Cancelled	North Korea	Pabellón de Hielo de Jaca, Jaca

1 April 2020; 16:30	Great Britain	Cancelled	Chinese Taipei	Pabellón de Hielo de Jaca, Jaca

1 April 2020; 20:00	Spain	Cancelled	Mexico	Pabellón de Hielo de Jaca, Jaca

3 April 2020; 13:00	Mexico	Cancelled	Great Britain	Pabellón de Hielo de Jaca, Jaca

3 April 2020; 16:30	Chinese Taipei	Cancelled	Latvia	Pabellón de Hielo de Jaca, Jaca

3 April 2020; 20:00	North Korea	Cancelled	Spain	Pabellón de Hielo de Jaca, Jaca

4 April 2020; 13:00	Latvia	Cancelled	Great Britain	Pabellón de Hielo de Jaca, Jaca

4 April 2020; 16:30	Mexico	Cancelled	North Korea	Pabellón de Hielo de Jaca, Jaca

4 April 2020; 20:00	Spain	Cancelled	Chinese Taipei	Pabellón de Hielo de Jaca, Jaca

== Division II Group B ==
2020 IIHF Women's World Championship Division II B

Tournament details
- Host country: Iceland
- City: Akureyri
- Venue: 1 (in 1 host city)
- Dates: 23–29 February 2020
- Teams: 6

Tournament statistics
- Games played: 15
- Goals scored: 106 (7.07 per game)
- Attendance: 1,957 (130 per game)
- Scoring leader: (Iceland) Silvía Björgvinsdóttir (13 points)

Official website
- www.iihf.com

=== Participating teams ===
Team	Qualification
Australia	Placed 6th in Division II A previous year and were relegated.
New Zealand	Placed 2nd in Division II B previous year.
Iceland	Hosts; placed 3rd in Division II B previous year.
Turkey	Placed 4th in Division II B previous year.
Croatia	Placed 5th in Division II B previous year.
Ukraine	Placed 1st in Division II B Qualification previous year and were promoted.

=== Match officials ===
Four referees and eight linesmen are selected for the tournament.

Referees	Linesmen
(Austria) Ulrike Winklmayr; (Czech Republic) Ilona Novotná; (Switzerland) Michaela Matejová; (United States) Charlotte Hurley	(United Kingdom) Faye Andrews; (Iceland) Ingibjörg Hjartardóttir; (Iceland) Guðlaug Þorsteinsdóttir; (Latvia) Baiba Dzene; (Poland) Klaudia Chrapek; (Slovakia) Eva Mária Moleková; (Switzerland) Anina Egli; (United Arab Emirates) Fatima Al-Ali

=== Final standings ===
Pos	Team	Pld	W	OTW	OTL	L	GF	GA	GD	Pts	Relegation
1	Australia (Note: Australia were originally promoted to Division II A, however, that promotion was rescinded due to the COVID-19 pandemic.)	5	5	0	0	0	39	4	+35	15	
2	Iceland (H)	5	4	0	0	1	25	7	+18	12	
3	New Zealand	5	3	0	0	2	20	16	+4	9	
4	Turkey	5	1	1	0	3	10	14	−4	5	
5	Croatia	5	0	1	0	4	5	39	−34	2 (Note: Croatia 2–1 (GWS) Ukraine)	
6	Ukraine	5	0	0	2	3	7	26	−19	2	Relegated to the 2022 Division III

Source: IIHF
Rules for classification: 1) points; 2) head-to-head points; 3) head-to-head goal difference; 4) head-to-head number of goals scored; 5) result against closest best-ranked team outside tied teams; 6) result against second-best ranked team outside tied teams; 7) seeding before tournament.
(H) Host

=== Match results ===
All times are local (Western European Time – UTC±0).

23 February 2020; 13:00	Ukraine	2–3 OT (0–2, 1–0, 1–0) (OT: 0–1)	Turkey	Akureyri Ice Rink, Akureyri; Attendance: 20

Game reference

Nataliya Kozachuk
Goalies
Sera Doğramacı
Referee:
(Czech Republic) Ilona Novotná
Linesmen:
(United Arab Emirates) Fatima Al-Ali
(United Kingdom) Faye Andrews

	0–1	03:50 – Taygar (Güven)
	0–2	15:17 – D. Lökbaş (Uygun)
Chyzhova (SH) – 21:03	1–2
Dobrovolska (PP2) – 36:19	2–2
	2–3	62:33 – Oğuz (Uygun)

10 min
Penalties
12 min
32
Shots
25

23 February 2020; 16:30	New Zealand	11–1 (2–0, 5–0, 4–1)	Croatia	Akureyri Ice Rink, Akureyri; Attendance: 17

Game reference

Danielle Strayer
Goalies
Petra Mlinarević
Mirna Sertić
Referee:
(Switzerland) Michaela Matejová
Linesmen:
(Poland) Klaudia Chrapek
(Iceland) Ingibjörg Hjartardóttir

Gregory (A. Hyde, Kivell) – 07:14	1–0
Shields (C. Heale) – 09:57	2–0
Horner-Pascoe (Shields) – 24:20	3–0
Gregory (Kivell) – 25:14	4–0
Horner-Pascoe (C. Heale) – 30:56	5–0
C. Heale (Shields) – 34:18	6–0
Lilly (Gregory) – 39:53	7–0
Gregory (Shields) – 41:07	8–0
Murray (A. Heale) – 42:17	9–0
	9–1	42:36 – Kadijević (Čavka)
Shields (C. Heale, Horner-Pascoe) – 45:52	10–1
Murray (Kloss) – 48:29	11–1

8 min
Penalties
14 min
41
Shots
10

23 February 2020; 20:00	Iceland	1–6 (0–4, 1–2, 0–0)	Australia	Akureyri Ice Rink, Akureyri; Attendance: 317

Game reference

Karitas Halldorsdóttir
Birta Helgudóttir
Goalies
Olivia Last
Referee:
(Austria) Ulrike Winklmayr
Linesmen:
(Latvia) Baiba Dzene
(Slovakia) Eva Mária Moleková

	0–1	03:45 – Clark-Crumpton (Farrier, Ayris)
	0–2	12:24 – Green (Moore) (PP)
	0–3	14:13 – Reynolds (Kenyon)
	0–4	19:25 – Clark-Crumpton (Farrier, Ayris)
	0–5	20:40 – Green (Aparicio)
	0–6	22:13 – Ayris
Su. Björgvinsdóttir (Blöndal, Si. Björgvinsdóttir) – 38:37	1–6

12 min
Penalties
8 min
23
Shots
31

24 February 2020; 13:00	Croatia	2–1 GWS (1–0, 0–1, 1–0) (OT: 0–0) (SO: 1–0)	Ukraine	Akureyri Ice Rink, Akureyri; Attendance: 15

Game reference
Petra Mlinarević	Goalies	Nataliya Kozachuk	Referee: (Czech Republic) Ilona Novotná; Linesmen: (Slovakia) Eva Mária Moleková (Iceland) Guðlaug Þorsteinsdóttir
Čavka (Smolec) (PP) – 14:30 / 1–0; / 1–1 / 24:11 – Kovtun			Referee: (Czech Republic) Ilona Novotná; Linesmen: (Slovakia) Eva Mária Moleková (Iceland) Guðlaug Þorsteinsdóttir
Kadijević; Buljeta; Smolec (miss)	Shootout	(miss) Zabarna; (miss) Tsymyrenko; (miss) Chyzhova; (miss) Tkachuk	Referee: (Czech Republic) Ilona Novotná; Linesmen: (Slovakia) Eva Mária Moleková (Iceland) Guðlaug Þorsteinsdóttir
8 min	Penalties	10 min	Referee: (Czech Republic) Ilona Novotná; Linesmen: (Slovakia) Eva Mária Moleková (Iceland) Guðlaug Þorsteinsdóttir
28	Shots	43	Referee: (Czech Republic) Ilona Novotná; Linesmen: (Slovakia) Eva Mária Moleková (Iceland) Guðlaug Þorsteinsdóttir

24 February 2020; 16:30	Australia	2–1 (1–0, 1–1, 0–0)	Turkey	Akureyri Ice Rink, Akureyri; Attendance: 20

Game reference

Olivia Last
Goalies
Sera Doğramacı
Referee:
(Austria) Ulrike Winklmayr
Linesmen:
(United Arab Emirates) Fatima Al-Ali
(Switzerland) Anina Egli

Clark-Crumpton (Aparicio, Green) (PP) – 14:40	1–0
	1–1	21:18 – Baktıroğlu (Figenli, D. Lökbaş) (PP)
Clark-Crumpton (Farrier, Ayris) – 30:20	2–1

16 min
Penalties
4 min
41
Shots
20

24 February 2020; 20:00	New Zealand	1–4 (0–2, 0–1, 1–1)	Iceland	Akureyri Ice Rink, Akureyri; Attendance: 333

Game reference

Danielle Strayer
Goalies
Birta Helgudóttir
Referee:
(United States) Charlotte Hurley
Linesmen:
(United Kingdom) Faye Andrews
(Poland) Klaudia Chrapek

	0–1	14:31 – Su. Björgvinsdóttir (Si. Björgvinsdóttir)
	0–2	15:09 – Si. Björgvinsdóttir (Garðarsdóttir)
	0–3	27:18 – Blöndal (Snorradóttir) (PP)
C. Heale (Kivell) – 48:17	1–3
	1–4	48:54 – Si. Björgvinsdóttir (Su. Björgvinsdóttir)

6 min
Penalties
10 min
18
Shots
45

26 February 2020; 13:00	Australia	15–0 (4–0, 5–0, 6–0)	Croatia	Akureyri Ice Rink, Akureyri; Attendance: 22

Game reference

Tina Girdler
Goalies
Petra Mlinarević
Mirna Sertić
Referee:
(United States) Charlotte Hurley
Linesmen:
(Latvia) Baiba Dzene
(Iceland) Guðlaug Þorsteinsdóttir

Green (Aparicio) – 02:59	1–0
Padjen (Roberts) – 05:03	2–0
Badaoui (Roberts, Tihema) – 12:27	3–0
Reynolds (Cochrane) – 14:55	4–0
Reynolds (Cochrane) – 24:43	5–0
Clark-Crumpton (Harvey) – 28:02	6–0
Ayris (Clark-Crumpton) – 30:46	7–0
Clark-Crumpton (Padjen) – 34:08	8–0
Aparicio (Morre, Cochrane) (PP) – 39:08	9–0
Godfrey (Moore) (SH) – 45:20	10–0
Godfrey (Padjen, Harvey) (SH) – 45:32	11–0
Ayris (Tihema, Padjen) (PP) – 47:24	12–0
Clark-Crumpton (Green, Moore) (PP) – 50:19	13–0
Aparicio (Green, Kenyon) – 54:40	14–0
Moore (Badaoui) (PP) – 56:52	15–0

10 min
Penalties
12 min
90
Shots
3

26 February 2020; 16:30	New Zealand	5–3 (3–1, 1–1, 1–1)	Ukraine	Akureyri Ice Rink, Akureyri; Attendance: 20

Game reference

Lochlyn Hyde
Goalies
Nataliya Kozachuk
Referee:
(Switzerland) Michaela Matejová
Linesmen:
(Switzerland) Anina Egli
(Iceland) Ingibjörg Hjartardóttir

Kivell (Gregory) (PP) – 02:36	1–0
Kivell (Woodyear-Smith, Neville-Lamb) (PP) – 06:22	2–0
	2–1	10:09 – Chyzhova (SH)
Kivell (PP2) – 18:42	3–1
	3–2	21:49 – Kovtun (Kozub) (PP)
Kivell (Gregory) 35:25	4–2
	4–3	41:27 – Chyzhova (Dobrovolska)
Shields (Woodyear-Smith) 47:32	5–3

10 min
Penalties
20 min
44
Shots
25

26 February 2020; 20:00	Iceland	6–0 (3–0, 0–0, 3–0)	Turkey	Akureyri Ice Rink, Akureyri; Attendance: 370

Game reference

Birta Helgudóttir
Goalies
Sera Doğramacı
Referee:
(Czech Republic) Ilona Novotná
Linesmen:
(Poland) Klaudia Chrapek
(Slovakia) Eva Mária Moleková

Si. Björgvinsdóttir (Blöndal) – 06:13	1–0
Snorradóttir (Si. Björgvinsdóttir) – 10:19	2–0
Bergsdóttir (Hjaltested, Viðarsdóttir) – 19:47	3–0
Si. Björgvinsdóttir – 46:57	4–0
Si. Björgvinsdóttir (Su. Björgvinsdóttir) – 53:36	5–0
Su. Björgvinsdóttir (Geirsdóttir) – 56:27	6–0

12 min
Penalties
2 min
45
Shots
9

27 February 2020; 13:00	Ukraine	1–9 (0–2, 0–2, 1–5)	Australia	Akureyri Ice Rink, Akureyri; Attendance: 12

Game reference

Viktoriia Tkachenko
Goalies
Tina Girdler
Referee:
(Switzerland) Michaela Matejová
Linesmen:
(United Kingdom) Faye Andrews
(Iceland) Ingibjörg Hjartardóttir

	0–1	07:08 – Clark-Crumpton (Moore)
	0–2	19:16 – Moore (Green, Cochrane) (PP)
	0–3	37:13 – Farrier (Godfrey)
	0–4	39:05 – Cochrane (Godfrey, Tihema)
	0–5	40:38 – Clark-Crumpton (Ayris, Farrier)
	0–6	42:57 – Farrier (Ayris)
	0–7	49:29 – Ayris (Farrier)
	0–8	53:18 – Farrier (Clark-Crumpton)
Tsymyrenko (Skashchuk) – 53:52	1–8
	1–9	55:27 – Godfrey (Farrier, Ayris) (PP)

10 min
Penalties
8 min
9
Shots
45

27 February 2020; 16:30	Turkey	1–2 (0–0, 0–1, 1–1)	New Zealand	Akureyri Ice Rink, Akureyri; Attendance: 17

Game reference

Sera Doğramacı
Goalies
Danielle Strayer
Referee:
(Austria) Ulrike Winklmayr
Linesmen:
(Switzerland) Anina Egli
(Iceland) Guðlaug Þorsteinsdóttir

	0–1	30:45 – Kivell (Gregory)
Uygun (Figenli) – 44:24	1–1
	1–2	47:54 – C. Heale (Horner-Pascoe, Smith)

4 min
Penalties
8 min
32
Shots
30

27 February 2020; 20:00	Croatia	0–7 (0–1, 0–3, 0–3)	Iceland	Akureyri Ice Rink, Akureyri; Attendance: 320

Game reference

Petra Mlinarević
Mirna Sertić
Goalies
Karitas Halldorsdóttir
Referee:
(United States) Charlotte Hurley
Linesmen:
(United Arab Emirates) Fatima Al-Ali
(Latvia) Baiba Dzene

0–1	16:33 – Garðarsdóttir (Leifsdóttir) (PP)
0–2	23:22 – Su. Björgvinsdóttir (Si. Björgvinsdóttir)
0–3	25:06 – Bergsdóttir (Hjaltested, Viðarsdóttir)
0–4	37:05 – Si. Björgvinsdóttir (PP)
0–5	41:41 – Shantz-Smiley (Johannesdóttir, Ágústsdóttir)
0–6	51:05 – Ingadóttir (Garðarsdóttir, Johannesdóttir)
0–7	52:09 – Arnadóttir (Alexdóttir)

12 min
Penalties
2 min
5
Shots
66

29 February 2020; 13:00	Turkey	5–2 (1–1, 2–1, 2–0)	Croatia	Akureyri Ice Rink, Akureyri; Attendance: 12

Game reference

Sera Doğramacı
Merve Karataş
Goalies
Petra Mlinarević
Referee:
(Switzerland) Michaela Matejová
Linesmen:
(Poland) Klaudia Chrapek
(Iceland) Ingibjörg Hjartardóttir

Demirkol (Dursun) – 08:33	1–0
	1–1	09:38 – Kadijević (Čavka, Vrbančić)
	1–2	27:52 – Kadijević (Matak)
Demirkol (Taygar) – 36:52	2–2
Baktıroğlu (D. Lökbaş) – 37:25	3–2
Güven (Oğuz) (SH) – 52:29	4–2
Taygar (A. Lökbaş) (SH, EN) – 58:27	5–2

8 min
Penalties
8 min
43
Shots
33

29 February 2020; 16:30	Australia	7–1 (1–1, 2–0, 4–0)	New Zealand	Akureyri Ice Rink, Akureyri; Attendance: 42

Game reference

Olivia Last
Goalies
Danielle Strayer
Referee:
(United States) Charlotte Hurley
Linesmen:
(Switzerland) Anina Egli
(Slovakia) Eva Mária Moleková

	0–1	02:44 – C. Heale (Horner-Pascoe)
Godfrey (SH) – 04:23	1–1
Padjen – 22:09	2–1
Aparicio (Farrier) – 27:15	3–1
Godfrey (Tihema) – 41:12	4–1
Tihema (Godfrey, Moore) – 45:04	5–1
Farrier – 47:55	6–1
Godfrey (Goonan) – 55:11	7–1

16 min
Penalties
12 min
53
Shots
24

29 February 2020; 20:00	Iceland	7–0 (0–0, 5–0, 2–0)	Ukraine	Akureyri Ice Rink, Akureyri; Attendance: 420

Game reference

Karitas Halldorsdóttir
Birta Helgudóttir
Goalies
Viktoriia Tkachenko
Nataliya Kozachuk
Referee:
(Czech Republic) Ilona Novotná
Linesmen:
(United Arab Emirates) Fatima Al-Ali
(United Kingdom) Faye Andrews

Gardarsdóttir (Hjaltested) – 21:18	1–0
Su. Björgvinsdóttir (Si. Björgvinsdóttir, Kjartansdóttir) – 27:03	2–0
Snorradóttir (Kjartansdóttir, Hafsteinsdóttir) – 32:54	3–0
Bergsdottir (Karvelsdóttir) – 33:37	4–0
Si. Björgvinsdóttir (Su. Björgvinsdóttir) – 34:59	5–0
Johannesdóttir (Kjartansdóttir, Gardarsdóttir) (PP) – 41:27	6–0
Si. Björgvinsdóttir (Su. Björgvinsdóttir) – 58:43	7–0

6 min
Penalties
10 min
55
Shots
10

=== Awards and statistics ===
==== Awards ====
Award	Player
Best Goalkeeper	(Australia) Olivia Last
Best Defenceman	(Australia) Rylie Padjen
Best Forward	(Iceland) Silvía Björgvinsdóttir

==== Scoring leaders ====
List shows the top skaters sorted by points, then goals.

Player	GP	G	A	Pts	+/−	PIM	POS
(Iceland) Silvía Björgvinsdóttir	5	8	5	13	+11	2	F
(Australia) Michelle Clark-Crumpton	5	9	2	11	+10	4	F
(Australia) Natasha Farrier	5	4	7	11	+12	4	F
(Australia) Natalie Ayris	5	4	6	11	+13	4	D
(Australia) Sharna Godfrey	5	6	3	9	+13	0	F
(Iceland) Sunna Björgvinsdóttir	5	5	4	9	+11	6	F
(New Zealand) Jana Kivell	5	5	3	8	0	0	F
(Australia) Georgia Moore	5	2	6	8	+11	0	D
(New Zealand) Caitlin Heale	5	4	3	7	+3	6	F
(Australia) Shona Green	5	3	4	7	+3	12	F
(New Zealand) Hope Gregory	5	3	4	7	0	0	F

GP = Games played; G = Goals; A = Assists; Pts = Points; +/− = Plus/minus; PIM = Penalties in minutes; POS = Position
Source: IIHF.com

==== Goaltending leaders ====
Only the top five goaltenders, based on save percentage, who have played at least 40% of their team's minutes, are included in this list.

Player	TOI	GA	GAA	SA	Sv%	SO
(Australia) Olivia Last	180:00	3	1.00	67	95.52	0
(Iceland) Birta Helgudóttir	189:17	3	0.95	49	93.88	1
(Turkey) Sera Doğramacı	299:50	14	2.80	181	92.27	0
(Australia) Tina Girdler	120:00	1	0.50	12	91.67	1
(New Zealand) Danielle Strayer	167:55	11	3.93	123	91.06	0

TOI = Time on ice (minutes:seconds); SA = Shots against; GA = Goals against; GAA = Goals against average; Sv% = Save percentage; SO = Shutouts
Source: IIHF.com
