= Ukraine women's national ice hockey team =

Ukraine
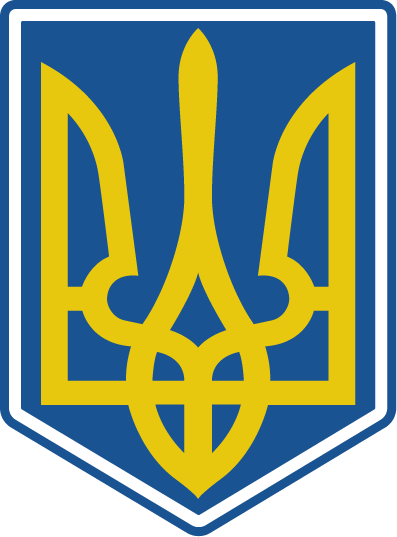
- Association: Ice Hockey Federation of Ukraine
- Head coach: Yevgeniy Alipov
- Assistants: Igor Karpenko; Oleksandr Nikulichev
- Captain: Valeria Manchak
- Most games: Darya Tsymirenko (28)
- Top scorer: Valeria Manchak (25)
- Most points: Valeria Manchak; Darya Tsymirenko (48)
- Team colors
- IIHF code: UKR

Ranking
- Current IIHF: 33 (▲1) (3 June 2026)
- Highest IIHF: 38 (first in 2021)
- Lowest IIHF: 40 (2022)

First international
- Ukraine 3–0 Latvia (Riga, Latvia; 1 November 1992)

Biggest win
- Ukraine 9–1 Bulgaria (Zagreb, Croatia; 11 March 2024); Ukraine 10–2 Hong Kong (Dunedin, New Zealand; 20 April 2025)

Biggest defeat
- Finland 31–0 Ukraine (Russia; 7 October 1994)

World Championships
- Appearances: 6 (first in 2019)
- Best result: 31st (2025, 2026)

European Championships
- Appearances: 2 (first in 1993)
- Best result: 11th (1993)

International record (W–L–T)
- 27–27–0

The Ukraine women's national ice hockey team is the women's national ice hockey team of Ukraine. The team is controlled by the Ice Hockey Federation of Ukraine, a member of the International Ice Hockey Federation. They made their World Championship debut in 2019 winning all four games to gain promotion to Division II B.

== History ==
Ukraine played its first game in 1992 in a qualification game against Latvia for participation in the 1993 Women's European Ice Hockey Championships. The game was held in Riga, Latvia with Ukraine finishing with a 3–0 win. The game was part of a four team qualification series against Italy, Latvia, and the Netherlands but due to the withdrawals of Italy and the Netherlands the series was reduced to three games between Ukraine and Latvia which Ukraine won two games to one. The following year Ukraine competed at the 1993 Women's European Ice Hockey Championships. They played five games in the Group B tournament which was held in Kyiv, Ukraine. They finished the tournament with one win out of their four games played, managing only to beat Latvia who finished on top of the Group B table.

In 1994 Ukraine competed at the Moscow Tournament against Finland, Latvia, and Russia. They lost all three of their games with the 31–0 loss against Finland being recorded as their worst ever result. The following year Ukraine competed at the 1995 Women's European Ice Hockey Championships. They were placed in the Group B tournament being held in Denmark and went on to lose all four of their games.

== Tournament record ==
=== World Championship ===
- 2019 – 35th place (1st in Division IIB Q, promoted to Division IIB)
- 2020 – 34th place (6th in Division IIB, relegated to Division III)
- 2021 – Cancelled due to the COVID-19 pandemic
- 2022 – Withdrawn due to the Russian invasion of Ukraine
- 2023 – 34th place (2nd in Division IIIA)
- 2024 – 35th place (1st in Division IIIA, promoted to Division IIB)
- 2025 – 31st place (3rd in Division IIB)
- 2026 – 31st place (3rd in Division IIB)

=== Other tournaments ===
- 1993 Women's European Ice Hockey Championships. Finish: 5th in Group B (11th overall)
- 1994 Moscow Tournament. Finish: 4th
- 1995 Women's European Ice Hockey Championships. Finish: 8th in Group B (14th overall)

== See also ==
- Ukraine men's national ice hockey team
- Ukraine men's national junior ice hockey team
