= North Korea women's national ice hockey team =

North Korea
- The flag of North Korea is the badge used on the players jerseys.
- Association: Ice Hockey Association of the DPR Korea
- General manager: Jo Kyong-sam
- Head coach: Kwak Kum-sil
- Assistants: Jon Song-chol; Jong Song-chol
- Captain: Jong Su-hyon
- Most games: O Chol-ok (53)
- Top scorer: O Chol-ok (24)
- Most points: Ri Sol-gyong (38)
- IIHF code: PRK

Ranking
- Current IIHF: 38 (▲1) (3 June 2026)
- Highest IIHF: 13 (2003)
- Lowest IIHF: 43 (2023)

First international
- Kazakhstan 4–3 North Korea (Székesfehérvár, Hungary; 19 March 1999)

Biggest win
- North Korea 14–0 South Africa (Istanbul, Turkey; 4 April 2024)

Biggest defeat
- Slovakia 9–0 North Korea (Beijing, China; 9 April 2015); Poland 9–0 North Korea (Bytom, Poland; 12 April 2025)

World Championships
- Appearances: 19 (first in 2001)
- Best result: 12th (2001)

Asian Winter Games
- Appearances: 3 (first in 2003)
- Best result: 4th (2003, 2007, 2011)

Challenge Cup of Asia
- Appearances: 1 (first in 2010)
- Best result: (bronze) (2010)

International record (W–L–T)
- 46–70–2

The North Korean women's national ice hockey team (recognized as DPR Korea by IIHF) represents North Korea at the International Ice Hockey Federation's IIHF World Women's Championships. The women's national team was created in 1999 and is controlled by Ice Hockey Association of the DPR Korea. North Korea has 920 female players. The North Korean women's national team is ranked 42nd in the world.

== Tournament record ==
=== Olympic ===
The North Korean women's hockey team has never qualified itself for an Olympic tournament though North Korean players were part of a Unified Korea Team which participated at the 2018 Winter Olympics in South Korea.

=== World Championship ===
- 1999 – NR (2nd in Pool B Qualification Group B)
- 2000 – Finished 1st in Pool B Qualification (15th overall)
- 2001 – Finished 4th in Division I (12th overall)
- 2003 – Finished 6th in Division I (14th overall)
- 2004 – Finished 6th in Division I (15th overall, relegated to Division II)
- 2005 – Finished 4th in Division II (18th overall)
- 2007 – Finished 3rd in Division II (18th overall)
- 2008 – Finished 3rd in Division II (18th overall)
- 2009 – Finished 2nd in Division II (17th overall)
- 2011 – withdrawn. Relegated to Division III for the 2012 IIHF Women's World Championship
- 2012 – Finished 1st in Division IIA (21st overall, promoted to Division IB)
- 2013 – Finished 3rd in Division IB (17th overall)
- 2014 – Finished 5th in Division IB (19th overall)
- 2015 – Finished 6th in Division IB (20th overall, relegated to Division IIA)
- 2016 – Finished 4th in Division IIA (24th overall)
- 2017 – Finished 4th in Division IIA (24th overall)
- 2018 – Finished 3rd in Division IIA (24th overall)
- 2019 – Finished 5th in Division IIA (27th overall)
- 2020 – Cancelled due to the COVID-19 pandemic
- 2021 – Cancelled due to the COVID-19 pandemic
- 2022 – Withdrawn due to the COVID-19 pandemic
- 2023 – Withdrawn
- 2024 – Finished 1st in Division IIB (29th overall, promoted to Division IIA)
- 2025 – Finished 5th in Division IIA
- 2026 – Withdrawn

=== Asian Winter Games ===
- 2003 – Finished in 4th place
- 2007 – Finished in 4th place
- 2011 – Finished in 4th place
- 2025 –

=== IIHF Challenge Cup of Asia ===
- 2010 – 3rd

== All-time record against other nations ==
Last match update: 13 March 2022

Key
Positive balance (more Wins)
Neutral balance (Wins = Losses)
Negative balance (more Losses)

Team	GP	W	T	L	GF	GA
Australia	7	6	0	1	37	6
Slovenia	6	5	0	1	29	12
South Korea	7	5	0	2	35	9
Croatia	2	2	0	0	19	3
Austria	3	2	0	1	10	7
New Zealand	1	1	0	0	7	1
Spain	1	1	0	0	2	1
Netherlands	11	5	1	5	33	26
Great Britain	8	4	0	4	5	18
Mexico	2	1	0	1	5	6
Poland	1	0	0	1	4	9
Hungary	3	1	0	2	10	17
Norway	2	0	0	2	2	11
Slovakia	4	1	0	3	5	16
Denmark	4	1	0	3	7	21
Italy	6	2	0	4	15	21
France	5	1	0	4	4	21
Latvia	4	0	0	4	5	18
Czech Republic	4	0	0	4	8	22
Japan	7	0	1	6	12	35
Kazakhstan	10	1	0	9	13	40
China	10	1	0	9	19	49
Total	108	39	67	2	297	375
