= IIHF Women's World Championship =

Recurring women's ice hockey national teams tournament

- Current season, competition or edition: 2026 Women's Ice Hockey World Championships
- Sport: Ice hockey
- Founded: 1990; 36 years ago
- First season: 1990 IIHF Women's World Championship
- No. of teams: 10 in Top Division; 12 in Division I; 12 in Division II; 11 in Division III
- Most recent champion: United States (12th title)
- Most titles: Canada (13 titles)
- Website: IIHF.com

The IIHF Women's World Championship is the premier international women's tournament in ice hockey. It is governed by the International Ice Hockey Federation (IIHF).

The official world competition was first held in 1990, with four more championships held in the 90s. From 1989 to 1996, and in years that there was no world tournament held, there were European Championships and in 1995 and 1996 a Pacific Rim Championship. From the first Olympic Women's Ice Hockey Tournament in 1998 onward, the Olympic tournament was played instead of the IIHF Championships. Afterwards, the IIHF decided to hold Women's Championships in Olympic years, starting in 2014, but not at the top level. Since 2022, the top division of Women's Championship is played during Olympic years.

Canada and the United States have dominated the Championship since its inception. Canada won gold at the first eight consecutive tournaments and the United States has won gold at twelve of the last seventeen tournaments. Both national teams placed either first or second every tournament until Canada's streak was broken at the 2019 Championship. Finland is the third most successful World Championship team, having won fifteen bronze medals and one silver medal – achieved after breaking the Canadian gold-silver streak. Four other teams have medalled at a Women's World Championship: Russia and Sweden winning three bronze medals each; Czech Republic winning two; and Switzerland, winning one.

== Structure and qualification ==
The women's tournament began as an eight-team tournament featuring Canada, the US, the top five from the 1989 European Championships, and one Asian qualifier. The same formula was used for 1992, 1994, and 1997, but changed following the first Olympic women's ice hockey tournament at the 1998 Nagano Olympics. The top five teams from the Olympic tournament qualified for the 1999 World Championship, followed by the best three from final Olympic qualification rounds. Beginning in 1999, the championship became an annual tournament and the first divisional tournaments below the Top Division were played. Along with the creation of the lower divisions, a system of promotion and relegation was introduced, allowing for movement between all divisions.

After the 2017 tournament, it was announced that tournament would expand to 10 teams for 2019, having been played with 8 teams since the first tournament in 1990, except in 2004, 2007, 2008, and 2009, where 9 teams played. The 2004 edition featured 9 teams when Japan was promoted from Division II but no team was relegated from the Top Division in 2003, due to the cancellation of the top division tournament in China because of the outbreak of the SARS disease. Two teams were relegated from the Top Division in 2004, going back to 8 teams for 2005, but due to the success of the 9-team pool in 2004, IIHF decided to expand again to 9 teams for 2007. IIHF reverted to 8 teams after the 2009 tournament, and play continued in this format until the expansion of 2019.

=== Championship format ===
Initially, the tournament was an eight-team tournament divided into two groups, which played round-robin. The top two from each group played off for the gold, and beginning in 1999 the bottom two played off to determine placement and relegation. In 2004, 2007, 2008, and 2009 the tournament was played with nine nations, using three groups of three playing round-robin. In this format first place from each group continued on to play for gold, second place from each group played for placement and an opportunity to still play for bronze, and the third place teams played off to determine relegation. Beginning in 2011, the tournament changed the format to encourage more equal games. The top four seed nations played in Group A, where the top two teams got a bye to the semifinals, the bottom two go to the quarter-finals to face the top two finishers from Group B. The bottom two from Group B then play each other in a best of three to determine relegation. Beginning in 2019 the tournament was expanded to ten teams, bringing with it a new format. The ten teams are divided into two groups of five and play round-robin. In this format, the five teams in Group A and the top three teams from Group B move into the Quarterfinals, seeded A1vsB3, A2vsB2, A3vsB1, and A4vsA5. The bottom two from Group B now play only one 9th place game and both get relegated. As of 2021, the four teams that lose their quarterfinal games enter into a knockout tournament to determine 5th place with the winner earning a spot in Group A for the next tournament, though the 2024 tournament will not include these games. From 2026 on, the ten teams will be put into two groups of five, with the top four teams advancing to the knockout stage while the last-placed teams will play out the relegated team. The tournaments will be moved from April to November each year (Lower divisions from 2027 on).

=== Lower divisions ===
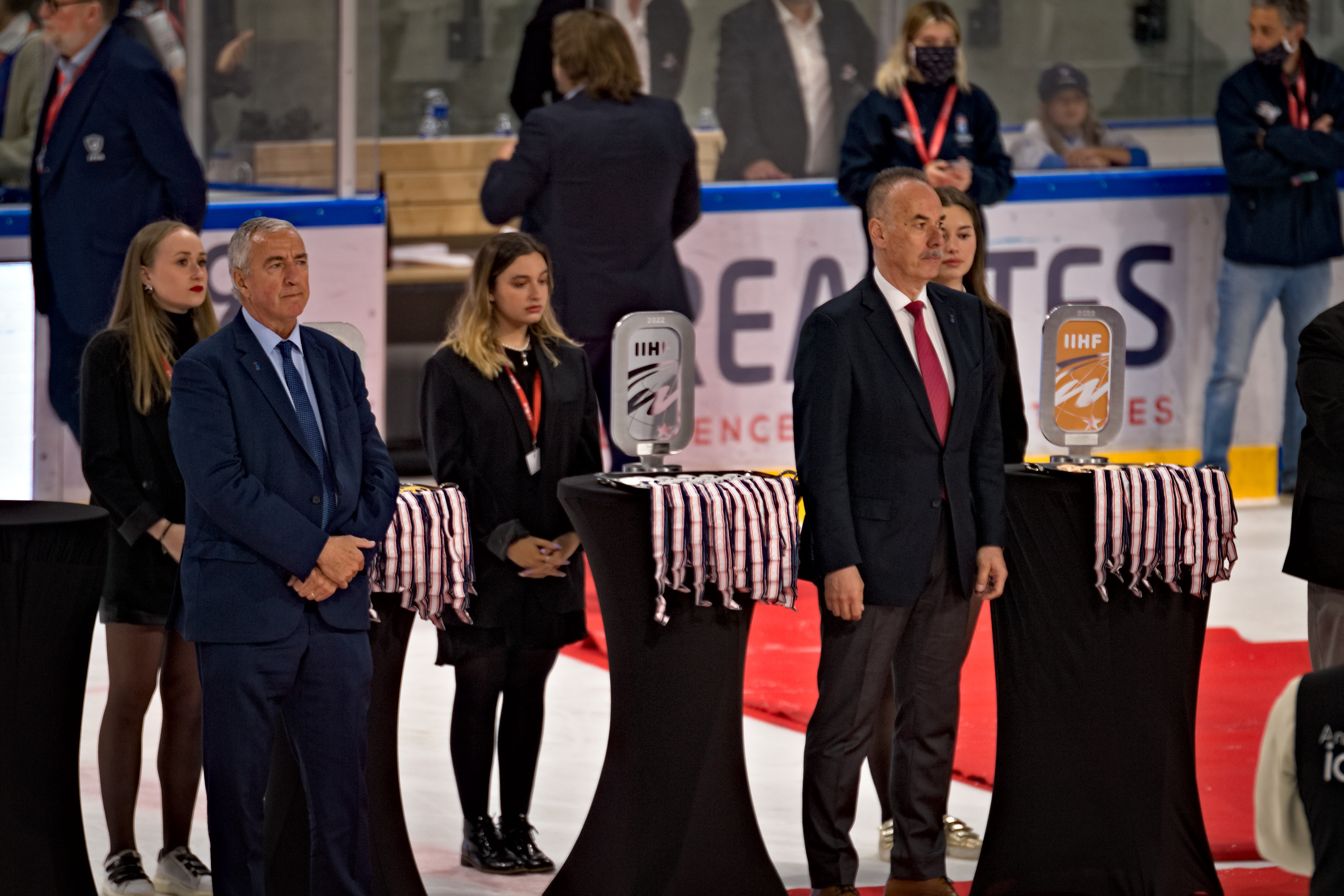
2022 Division I medal ceremony

Outside of the Top Division tournament, participating nations play in groups of no more than six teams. As of 2022, there are six group tiers across three divisions below the Top Division.

Introduced in 1999 as a Division I tournament and Division I qualification tournament, the number of lower divisions rapidly expanded as more national teams gained admittance. By 2003 the lower tiers were formalized into tiered groups of six teams each, called Division I, Division II, and Division III, with promotion for the top team in each and relegation for the bottom team. By 2009 it had grown up to Division V, but in 2012 the titles were changed to match the men's tournaments; Division I became IA, Division II became IB, Division III became IIA, Division IV became IIB, and Division V became IIB Qualification. Promotion and relegation remained the same after the title changes.

== Rules and eligibility ==
The rules of play are essentially the same as used for the men's tournaments, with one key difference: body checking is not permitted in the women's tournaments. Body checking was allowed at the first championship in 1990 but has been assessed as a minor penalty at all subsequent tournaments.

In order to be eligible to compete in IIHF events, players must be under the jurisdiction of the governing body they are representing and must be a citizen of that country. Additionally, the player must be eighteen years old, or sixteen with a medical waiver, in the season the tournament takes place.

== Tournaments ==
Year	Host city/cities	Final			Third place match		
Year	Host city/cities	Champions	Score	Runners-up	Third place	Score	Fourth place
1990	(Canada) Ottawa	Canada	5–2	United States	Finland	6–3	Sweden
1992	(Finland) Tampere	Canada	8–0	United States	Finland	5–4	Sweden
1994	(United States) Lake Placid	Canada	6–3	United States	Finland	8–1	China
1997	(Canada) Kitchener	Canada	4–3 (OT)	United States	Finland	3–0	China
1998	Competition not held during 1998 Winter Olympics						
1999	(Finland) Espoo/Vantaa	Canada	3–1	United States	Finland	8–2	Sweden
2000	(Canada) Mississauga	Canada	3–2 (OT)	United States	Finland	7–1	Sweden
2001	(United States) Minneapolis	Canada	3–2	United States	Russia	2–1	Finland
2002	Competition not held during 2002 Winter Olympics						
2003	Competition at top level was cancelled due to SARS outbreak in China						
2004	(Canada) Halifax/Dartmouth	Canada	2–0	United States	Finland	3–2	Sweden
2005	(Sweden) Linköping/Norrköping	United States	1–0 (SO)	Canada	Sweden	5–2	Finland
2006	Competition not held during 2006 Winter Olympics						
2007	(Canada) Winnipeg/Selkirk	Canada	5–1	United States	Sweden	1–0	Finland
2008	(China) Harbin	United States	4–3	Canada	Finland	4–1	Switzerland
2009	(Finland) Hämeenlinna	United States	4–1	Canada	Finland	4–1	Sweden
2010	Competition not held during 2010 Winter Olympics						
2011	(Switzerland) Zürich/Winterthur	United States	3–2 (OT)	Canada	Finland	3–2 (OT)	Russia
2012	(United States) Burlington	Canada	5–4 (OT)	United States	Switzerland	6–2	Finland
2013	(Canada) Ottawa	United States	3–2	Canada	Russia	2–0	Finland
2014	Competition not held at top level during 2014 Winter Olympics						
2015	(Sweden) Malmö	United States	7–5	Canada	Finland	4–1	Russia
2016	(Canada) Kamloops	United States	1–0 (OT)	Canada	Russia	1–0 (SO)	Finland
2017	(United States) Plymouth	United States	3–2 (OT)	Canada	Finland	8–0	Germany
2018	Competition not held at top level during 2018 Olympics						
2019	(Finland) Espoo	United States	2–1 (SO)	Finland	Canada	7–0	Russia
2020	Competition at top level, Division I, and Division II Group A was cancelled due to COVID-19 pandemic						
2021	(Canada) Calgary	Canada	3–2 (OT)	United States	Finland	3–1	Switzerland
2022	(Denmark) Herning/Frederikshavn	Canada	2–1	United States	Czechia	4–2	Switzerland
2023	(Canada) Brampton	United States	6–3	Canada	Czechia	3–2	Switzerland
2024	(United States) Utica, New York	Canada	6–5 (OT)	United States	Finland	3–2 (SO)	Czechia
2025	(Czech Republic) České Budějovice	United States	4–3 (OT)	Canada	Finland	4–3 (OT)	Czechia
2026	(Denmark) Herning/Esbjerg	United States	6–2	Canada	Sweden	2–1 (SO)	Finland
2027	(Canada) Quebec City						
2028	(Switzerland)						
2029							
2030	(Canada) TBD						

== Participation ==
Country	Tournaments	First	Last	Gold	Silver	Bronze	Total	Best finish (first/last)
Canada	25	1990	2026	13	11	1	25	1st (1990/2024)
United States	25	1990	2026	12	13	0	25	1st (2005/2026)
Finland	25	1990	2026	0	1	15	16	2nd (2019)
Russia	17	1997	2021	0	0	3	3	3rd (2001/2016)
Sweden	24	1990	2026	0	0	3	3	3rd (2005/2026)
Czechia	10	2013	2026	0	0	2	2	3rd (2022/2023)
Switzerland	22	1990	2026	0	0	1	1	3rd (2012)
China	12	1992	2024	0	0	0	0	4th (1994/1997)
Germany	20	1990	2026	0	0	0	0	4th (2017)
Japan	14	1990	2026	0	0	0	0	5th (2022)
Norway	5	1990	2025	0	0	0	0	6th (1990/1994)
Kazakhstan	5	2001	2011	0	0	0	0	6th (2009)
Denmark	5	1992	2026	0	0	0	0	7th (1992)
Slovakia	2	2011	2012	0	0	0	0	7th (2011)
Hungary	4	2021	2025	0	0	0	0	8th (2022)
France	2	2019	2023	0	0	0	0	10th (2019/2023)
Austria	1	2026		0	0	0	0	9th (2026)

== Awards ==
At most IIHF events, the tournament directorate awards the Best Forward, Best Defenceman, Best Goalkeeper and Most Valuable Player (MVP). At the Women's World Championship, these honours have been awarded in some combination since the first tournament, with the exception of 1997 and the cancelled tournaments in 2003 and 2020.

== All-time record ==
as of end of 2026 IIHF Women's World Championship

R	Team	App	C	F	3	4	GP	W	OTW	SOW	T	SOL	OTL	L	GF	GA	GD	Pts
1	United States	25	12	13	0	0	139	112	5	2	1	3	6	10	877	188	+689	323
2	Canada	25	13	11	1	0	139	107	6	3	0	1	5	17	798	183	+615	303
3	Finland	25	0	1	15	7	145	68	6	3	2	3	2	61	483	382	+101	204
4	Sweden	24	0	0	3	6	124	56	3	5	4	5	3	48	379	369	+10	177
5	West Germany (1990) / Germany (1992–)	20	0	0	0	1	100	33	2	2	2	1	6	54	180	389	–209	107
6	Switzerland	22	0	0	1	4	116	29	5	4	1	4	2	71	216	493	–277	103
7	Russia (1997–2019) / ROC (2021)	17	0	0	3	3	89	29	1	2	2	2	3	50	179	387	–208	89
8	Czechia	10	0	0	2	2	60	25	2	1	0	3	4	25	143	159	–16	88
9	Japan	14	0	0	0	0	72	14	2	2	0	3	4	47	107	308	–201	56
10	China	12	0	0	0	2	55	16	0	2	4	2	0	31	128	249	–121	44
11	Norway	5	0	0	0	0	24	5	0	0	1	0	0	18	49	141	–92	12
12	Hungary	4	0	0	0	0	18	3	0	0	0	1	1	13	26	66	–40	11
13	Slovakia	2	0	0	0	0	10	2	0	1	0	1	0	6	12	27	–15	9
14	Denmark	5	0	0	0	0	22	1	2	1	0	0	0	18	24	104	–80	9
15	Kazakhstan	5	0	0	0	0	23	0	0	2	1	1	0	19	19	126	–107	6
16	France	2	0	0	0	0	9	0	1	0	0	0	0	8	12	42	–30	2
17	Austria	1	0	0	0	0	5	0	1	0	0	0	0	4	6	22	–16	2

== Lower division tournaments ==
Year	Group B		Qualification for Group B									
Year	Host city/cities	Winner	Host city/cities	Winner								
1999	Colmar, France	Japan	Székesfehérvár, Hungary; Pyongyang, North Korea; Almaty, Kazakhstan	Italy; Kazakhstan								
2000	Riga and Liepāja, Latvia	Kazakhstan	Dunaújváros & Székesfehérvár, Hungary	North Korea								
	Division I		Division II		Division III		Division IV		Division V			
	Host city	Winner	Host city/cities	Winner	Host city	Winner	Host city	Winner	Host city	Winner		
2001	Briançon, France	Switzerland	Qualification: Bucharest, Romania; Maribor, Slovenia	Netherlands; Slovakia								
2003	Ventspils, Latvia	Japan	Lecco, Italy	Norway	Maribor, Slovenia	Australia						
2004	Ventspils, Latvia	Kazakhstan	Sterzing, Italy	Denmark	Maribor, Slovenia	Austria						
2005	Romanshorn, Switzerland	Switzerland	Asiago, Italy	Norway	Cape Town, South Africa	Slovenia	Dunedin, New Zealand	South Korea				
2007	Nikkō, Japan	Japan	Pyongyang, North Korea	Slovakia	Sheffield, United Kingdom	Australia	Miercurea Ciuc, Romania	Croatia				
2008	Ventspils, Latvia	Kazakhstan	Vierumäki, Finland	Austria	Miskolc, Hungary	Great Britain	Miercurea Ciuc, Romania	Iceland				
2009	Graz, Austria	Slovakia	Torre Pellice, Italy	Latvia								
2011	Ravensburg, Germany	Germany	Caen, France	Czech Republic	Newcastle, Australia	Netherlands	Reykjavík, Iceland	New Zealand	Sofia, Bulgaria	Poland		
	Division I A		Division I B		Division II A		Division II B		Division II B Qualification			
	Host city	Winner	Host city	Winner	Host city	Winner	Host city	Winner	Host city	Winner		
2012	Ventspils, Latvia	Czech Republic	Kingston upon Hull, United Kingdom	Denmark	Maribor, Slovenia	North Korea	Seoul, South Korea	Poland				
2013	Stavanger, Norway	Japan	Strasbourg, France	France	Auckland, New Zealand	Hungary	Puigcerdà, Spain	South Korea	İzmir, Turkey	Turkey		
2014	Přerov, Czech Republic	Czech Republic	Ventspils, Latvia	Latvia	Dumfries, United Kingdom	Italy	Jaca, Spain	Croatia	Mexico City, Mexico	Mexico		
2015	Rouen, France	Czech Republic	Beijing, China	Slovakia	Asiago, Italy	Kazakhstan	Reykjavík, Iceland	Slovenia	Kowloon, Hong Kong	Turkey		
2016	Aalborg, Denmark	Germany	Asiago, Italy	Hungary	Bled, Slovenia	Poland	Jaca, Spain	Australia	Sofia, Bulgaria	Romania		
2017	Graz, Austria	Japan	Katowice, Poland	Slovakia	Gangneung, South Korea	South Korea	Akureyri, Iceland	Mexico	Taipei, Taiwan	Chinese Taipei		
2018	Vaujany, France	France	Asiago, Italy	Italy	Maribor, Slovenia	Netherlands	Valdemoro, Spain	Spain	Sofia, Bulgaria	Croatia		
2019	Budapest, Hungary	Hungary	Beijing, China	Netherlands	Dumfries, United Kingdom	Slovenia	Brașov, Romania	Chinese Taipei	Cape Town, South Africa	Ukraine		
	Division I A		Division I B		Division II A		Division II B		Division III			
	Host city	Winner	Host city	Winner	Host city	Winner	Host city	Winner	Host city	Winner		
2020	~~Angers, France~~	^{[a]}	~~Katowice, Poland~~	^{[a]}	~~Jaca, Spain~~	^{[a]}	Akureyri, Iceland	Australia	Sofia, Bulgaria	South Africa		
2021	~~Angers, France~~	^{[a]}	~~Beijing, China~~	^{[a]}	~~Jaca, Spain~~	^{[a]}	~~Zagreb, Croatia~~	^{[a]}	~~Kaunas, Lithuania~~	^{[a]}		
	Division I A		Division I B		Division II A		Division II B		Division III A		Division III B	
	Host city	Winner	Host city	Winner	Host city	Winner	Host city	Winner	Host city	Winner	Host city	Winner
2022	Angers, France	France	Katowice, Poland	China	Jaca, Spain	Great Britain	Zagreb, Croatia	Iceland	Sofia, Bulgaria	Belgium	Belgrade, Serbia	Estonia
2023	Shenzhen, China	China	Suwon, South Korea	South Korea	Mexico City, Mexico	Latvia	Cape Town, South Africa	Belgium	Brașov, Romania	Hong Kong	Tnuvot, Israel	Serbia
2024	Klagenfurt, Austria	Norway	Riga, Latvia	Slovakia	Canillo, Andorra	Kazakhstan	Istanbul, Turkey	North Korea	Zagreb, Croatia	Ukraine	Kohtla-Järve, Estonia	Thailand
2025	Shenzhen, China	Austria	Dumfries, Great Britain	Italy	Bytom, Poland	Spain	Dunedin, New Zealand	Australia	Belgrade, Serbia	Lithuania	Sarajevo, Bosnia and Herzegovina	Bulgaria
2026	Budapest, Hungary	France	Puigcerdà, Spain	Netherlands	Bled, Slovenia	Poland	Hong Kong	Hong Kong	Zagreb, Croatia	Romania	Kohtla-Järve, Estonia	Estonia

Notes:

- ^{a} Tournament cancelled due to COVID-19 pandemic

== Attendance ==
The highest total attendance at a championship was 122,331 spectators at the 2025 edition in České Budějovice, Czech Republic. The highest attendance per game was 5,962 at the 2007 edition in Winnipeg and Selkirk, Canada.

List of the top 10 most attended tournaments
Year	Host country	Total attendance	Number of games	Attendance per game
2025	Czech Republic	122,331	29	4,218
2007	Canada †	119,231	20	5,962
2013	Canada	98,155	21	4,674
2004	Canada †	89,461	20	4,473
2024	United States	68,112	29	2,349
1997	Canada †	60,418	20	3,021
2023	Canada	59,372	31	1,915
2000	Canada †	57,444	20	2,872
2019	Finland	51,247	29	1,767
2022	Denmark	43,160	31	1,393

† = team won the championship as host

== See also ==
- 4 Nations Cup
- Ice hockey at the Olympic Games
- Canada–United States women's national ice hockey rivalry

== Works cited ==
- Müller, Stephan (2005). International Ice Hockey Encyclopaedia 1904–2005. Norderstedt: Books on Demand GmbH. ISBN 9783833441899.
- Duplacey, James (1998). Total Hockey: The official encyclopedia of the National Hockey League. Total Sports. pp. 487–9. ISBN 0-8362-7114-9.
- Podnieks, Andrew (2010). IIHF Media Guide & Record Book 2011. Toronto: Moydart Press. pp. 26–7, 227–235. ISBN 978-0986796401.
