= Poland women's national ice hockey team =

Poland
- The Coat of arms of Poland is the badge used on the players jerseys.
- Nickname: The Eagles
- Association: Polski Związek Hokeja na Lodzie
- Head coach: Arkadiusz Sobecki
- Assistants: Tomasz Cichoń; Sebastian Kłaczyński
- Captain: Karolina Późniewska
- Most games: Karolina Późniewska (148)
- Top scorer: Karolina Późniewska (111)
- Most points: Karolina Pozniewska (176)
- Team colors
- IIHF code: POL

Ranking
- Current IIHF: 20 (3 June 2026)
- Highest IIHF: 19 (2021)
- Lowest IIHF: 34 (2011)

First international
- Poland 23–0 Ireland (Sofia, Bulgaria; 14 March 2011)

Biggest win
- Poland 23–0 Ireland (Sofia, Bulgaria; 14 March 2011)

Biggest defeat
- Czech Republic 16–0 Poland (Chomutov, Czech Republic; 13 November 2021)

World Championships
- Appearances: 14 (first in 2011)
- Best result: 17th (2022)

International record (W–L–T)
- 70–69–0

The Polish women's national ice hockey team represents Poland at the International Ice Hockey Federation's IIHF World Women's Championships. The women's national team is controlled by Polski Związek Hokeja na Lodzie. As of 2024, Poland has 496 female players. The Polish women's national team is ranked 20th in the world.

== Tournament record ==
=== Olympic Games ===
The Polish Women hockey team has never qualified for an Olympic tournament.

=== World Championship ===
In 2011 the Polish team was for the first time involved in the World Championship competition. In the Division V the team made a big surprise by winning the first place in Division V (31st place) and was promoted to the Division IV for the 2012 IIHF Women's World Championship.

- 2011 – Finished in 30th place (1st in Division V, promoted to Division IIB)
- 2012 – Finished in 27th place (1st in Division IIB, promoted to Division IIA)
- 2013 – Finished in 25th place (5th in Division IIA)
- 2014 – Finished in 24th place (4th in Division IIA)
- 2015 – Finished in 24th place (4th in Division IIA)
- 2016 – Finished in 21st place (1st in Division IIA, promoted to Division IB)
- 2017 – Finished in 20th place (6th in Division IB)
- 2018 – Finished in 21st place (6th in Division IB)
- 2019 – Finished in 19th place (3rd in Division IB)
- 2020 – Cancelled due to the COVID-19 pandemic
- 2021 – Cancelled due to the COVID-19 pandemic
- 2022 – Finished in 17th place (2nd in Division IB)
- 2023 – Finished in 18th place (2nd in Division IB)
- 2024 – Finished in 22nd place (6th in Division IB, relegated to Division IIA)
- 2025 – Finished in 24th place (2nd in Division IIA)
- 2026 – Finished in 23rd place (1st in Division IIA, promoted to Division IB)
