= 2026 IIHF Women's World Championship Division II =

Tournament details
- Host countries: Slovenia; Hong Kong
- Venues: 2 (in 2 host cities)
- Dates: 12–18 April; 30 March – 5 April
- Teams: 12

The 2026 IIHF Women's World Championship Division II consisted of two international ice hockey tournaments of the 2026 Women's Ice Hockey World Championships organised by the International Ice Hockey Federation (IIHF).

Group A was being held in Bled, Slovenia from 13 to 19 April 2026 and Group B in Hong Kong, from 30 March to 5 April 2026.

Poland got promoted after winning Group A. Hong Kong won the Group B tournament and got promoted while Belgium finished last and was relegated.

== Group A tournament ==
2026 IIHF Women's World Championship Division II A

Tournament details
- Host country: Slovenia
- City: Bled
- Venue: 1 (in 1 host city)
- Dates: 13–18 April
- Teams: 6

Tournament statistics
- Games played: 10
- Goals scored: 64 (6.4 per game)
- Attendance: 1,596 (160 per game)
- Scoring leader: (Poland) Karolina Późniewska (13 points)

Official website
- Website

On 8 April 2026, North Korea withdrew from the tournament, citing logistical issues.

=== Participants ===
Team	Qualification
Slovenia	Host, placed 6th in Division I B and was relegated.
Poland	Placed 2nd in 2025 Division II A.
Iceland	Placed 3rd in 2025 Division II A.
Chinese Taipei	Placed 4th in 2025 Division II A.
~~North Korea~~	Placed 5th in 2025 Division II A.
Australia	Placed 1st in 2025 Division II B and was promoted.

=== Match officials ===
Three referees and seven linesperson were selected for the tournament.

Referees	Linesperson
(Canada) Audrey-Anne Girard; (Finland) Johanna Oksanen; (Hungary) Csilla Péter	(Australia) Bethany Bowshall; (Finland) Ellenoora Mikkonen; (France) Gaëlle Bourdon; (Hungary) Adrienn Paulheim; (Italy) Anna Callovini; (Japan) Kumiko Matsuo; (Slovenia) Ines Confidenti

=== Standings ===
Pos	Team	Pld	W	OTW	OTL	L	GF	GA	GD	Pts	Promotion or relegation
1	Poland	4	4	0	0	0	23	2	+21	12	Promotion to the 2027 Division I B
2	Slovenia (H)	4	2	0	0	2	14	12	+2	6	
3	Chinese Taipei	4	0	2	0	2	10	22	−12	4 (Note: Chinese Taipei 4 Pts, Australia 4 Pts, Iceland 1 Pt. Chinese Taipei 2–1 (GWS) Australia.)	
4	Australia	4	1	0	1	2	8	13	−5	4	
5	Iceland	4	1	0	1	2	9	15	−6	4	Relegation to the 2027 Division II B
–	North Korea (Note: North Korea withdrew before the tournament.)	0	0	0	0	0	0	0	0	0	

Source: IIHF
Rules for classification: 1) points; 2) head-to-head points; 3) head-to-head goal difference; 4) head-to-head number of goals scored; 5) result against closest best-ranked team outside tied teams; 6) result against second-best ranked team outside tied teams; 7) seeding before tournament.
(H) Host

=== Results ===
All times are local (UTC+2).

13 April 2026; 16:00	Australia	0–5 (0–3, 0–1, 0–1)	Poland	Ledena dvorana, Bled; Attendance: 117

Game reference

Olivia Last
Goalies
Nadia Ratajczyk
Referee:
(Hungary) Csilla Péter
Linesmen:
(Italy) Anna Callovini
(Japan) Kumiko Matsuo

0–1	04:07 – Późniewska (Korkuz, Onyshchenko) (PP)
0–2	10:05 – Czarnecka (Łąpieś, Kot) (PP)
0–3	13:07 – Późniewska (Korkuz)
0–4	24:03 – Zakrzewska (Nosal)
0–5	57:46 – Talanda (Kot)

8 min
Penalties
4 min
27
Shots
51

13 April 2026; 19:30	Iceland	4–3 (0–0, 1–3, 3–0)	Slovenia	Ledena dvorana, Bled; Attendance: 237

Game reference

Andrea Bachmann
Goalies
Ajda Jošt
Referee:
(Canada) Audrey-Anne Girard
Linesmen:
(Australia) Bethany Bowshall
(Finland) Ellenoora Mikkonen

	0–1	25:50 – Pren (Avsenek)
	0–2	29:10 – Confidenti (Pren, Karalič)
	0–3	29:17 – Blazinšek (Vakaričič, Pezdir)
Snorradóttir (Magnúsdóttir) (PP) – 32:07	1–3
Si. Björgvinsdóttir – 41:56	2–3
Si. Björgvinsdóttir (Magnúsdóttir) (PP) – 57:10	3–3
Su. Björgvinsdóttir (Snorradóttir) – 59:16	4–3

8 min
Penalties
10 min
39
Shots
32

14 April 2026; 19:30	Chinese Taipei	2–1 GWS (0–0, 1–0, 0–1) (OT: 0–0) (SO: 1–0)	Australia	Ledena dvorana, Bled; Attendance: 108

Game reference
Hsu Tzu-ting	Goalies	Olivia Last	Referee: (Finland) Johanna Oksanen; Linesmen: (France) Gaëlle Bourdon (Hungary) Adrienn Paulheim
Huang Y. (Cheng En-w.) – 25:49 / 1–0; / 1–1 / 50:27 – Roberts (Pethrick)			Referee: (Finland) Johanna Oksanen; Linesmen: (France) Gaëlle Bourdon (Hungary) Adrienn Paulheim
Yeh H. (miss); Chao; Hsu Ti. Tan (miss)	Shootout	(miss) Roberts; (miss) Pethrick; (miss) Cybulski; (miss) Julien	Referee: (Finland) Johanna Oksanen; Linesmen: (France) Gaëlle Bourdon (Hungary) Adrienn Paulheim
2 min	Penalties	8 min	Referee: (Finland) Johanna Oksanen; Linesmen: (France) Gaëlle Bourdon (Hungary) Adrienn Paulheim
44	Shots	50	Referee: (Finland) Johanna Oksanen; Linesmen: (France) Gaëlle Bourdon (Hungary) Adrienn Paulheim

15 April 2026; 16:00	Poland	4–1 (1–1, 0–0, 3–0)	Iceland	Ledena dvorana, Bled; Attendance: 114

Game reference

Nadia Ratajczyk
Goalies
Andrea Bachmann
Referee:
(Canada) Audrey-Anne Girard
Linesmen:
(Italy) Anna Callovini
(Slovenia) Ines Confidenti

	0–1	01:52 – Jóhannsdóttir (Su. Björgvinsdóttir, Magnúsdóttir)
Późniewska (Onyshchenko, Korkuz) (PP) – 12:22	1–1
Kot (Łąpieś) – 49:48	2–1
Późniewska (Sikorska) – 57:46	3–1
Późniewska (EN) – 59:57	4–1

2 min
Penalties
8 min
49
Shots
10

15 April 2026; 19:30	Slovenia	6–3 (2–1, 2–0, 2–2)	Chinese Taipei	Ledena dvorana, Bled; Attendance: 209

Game reference

Tjaša Intihar
Goalies
Chung Ai
Referee:
(Hungary) Csilla Péter
Linesmen:
(Australia) Bethany Bowshall
(Japan) Kumiko Matsuo

Pezdir (Blazinšek, Nylaander) – 06:41	1–0
Pren (Karalič, Ankele) – 16:01	2–0
	2–1	17:30 – Wu (Cheng En-w.)
Confidenti (Vakaričič, Pren) (PP) – 24:18	3–1
Pren (Ankele, Confidenti) – 34:21	4–1
Pezdir (Blazinšek, Nylaander) – 45:29	5–1
	5–2	46:28 – Hong (Chao, Huang Y.)
	5–3	49:45 – Yeh C. (Yu)
Glavič (Rogelj) – 55:31	6–3

4 min
Penalties
2 min
27
Shots
25

16 April 2026; 19:30	Australia	3–5 (1–2, 2–0, 0–3)	Slovenia	Ledena dvorana, Bled; Attendance: 246

Game reference

Sasha King
Olivia Last
Goalies
Ajda Jošt
Referee:
(Finland) Johanna Oksanen
Linesmen:
(Finland) Ellenoora Mikkonen
(Hungary) Adrienn Paulheim

	0–1	10:17 – Confidenti (Karalič, Pren)
	0–2	17:15 – Pren (Vakaričič)
Newmark (Pethrick) – 18:47	1–2
Julien (Venus) (PP) – 23:16	2–2
Julien (Roberts) – 25:18	3–2
	3–3	45:00 – Blazinšek (Pezdir)
	3–4	46:20 – Nylaander (Confidenti, Buljeta)
	3–5	48:14 – Confidenti (Vakaričič) (PP)

4 min
Penalties
4 min
33
Shots
29

17 April 2026; 16:00	Iceland	1–4 (0–2, 1–1, 0–1)	Australia	Ledena dvorana, Bled; Attendance: 104

Game reference

Andrea Bachmann
Goalies
Olivia Last
Referee:
(Canada) Audrey-Anne Girard
Linesmen:
(Slovenia) Ines Confidenti
(Hungary) Adrienn Paulheim

	0–1	02:46 – Pethrick (PP)
	0–2	10:11 – Davis-Tope (Julien)
Magnúsdóttir (Su. Björgvinsdóttir, Ka. Björnsdóttir) (PP) – 22:21	1–2
	1–3	32:20 – Julien (Davis-Tope) (PP)
	1–4	46:49 – Davis-Tope (Roberts, Pethrick)

12 min
Penalties
4 min
14
Shots
35

17 April 2026; 19:30	Poland	12–1 (2–0, 6–0, 4–1)	Chinese Taipei	Ledena dvorana, Bled; Attendance: 115

Game reference

Nadia Ratajczyk
Alicja Kobiela
Goalies
Chung Ai
Wang Yun-tzu
Referee:
(Hungary) Csilla Péter
Linesmen:
(France) Gaëlle Bourdon
(Japan) Kumiko Matsuo

Późniewska (Korkuz, Sfora) – 00:36	1–0
Onyshchenko (Talanda) (PP) – 08:32	2–0
Łąpieś (Późniewska, Korkuz) – 20:29	3–0
Cybulska (Czarnecka) – 20:45	4–0
Późniewska (Onyshchenko) – 22:58	5–0
Późniewska (Korkuz, Onyshchenko) – 27:21	6–0
Łąpieś (Późniewska, Korkuz) – 34:52	7–0
Łąpieś (Późniewska, Korkuz) – 38:08	8–0
Górska (Zakrzewska, Nosal) – 43:03	9–0
	9–1	45:39 – Lin
Łąpieś (Onyshchenko, Późniewska) – 54:12	10–1
Kędra (Czarnecka, Zakrzewska) – 54:40	11–1
Onyshchenko (Późniewska, Łąpieś) – 57:01	12–1

0 min
Penalties
6 min
65
Shots
18

18 April 2026; 16:00	Chinese Taipei	4–3 GWS (1–0, 2–2, 0–1) (OT: 0–0) (SO: 1–0)	Iceland	Ledena dvorana, Bled; Attendance: 101

Game reference

Hsu Tzu-ting
Goalies
Andrea Bachmann
Referee:
(Finland) Johanna Oksanen
Linesmen:
(France) Gaëlle Bourdon
(Finland) Ellenoora Mikkonen

Huang Y. (Cheng En-n., Cheng En-w.) – 09:26	1–0
Huang Y. (Cheng En-n., Cheng En-w.) – 23:02	2–0
	2–1	27:31 – Snorradóttir (Magnúsdóttir, Su. Björgvinsdóttir) (PP)
Huang Y. (Cheng En-w.) (PP) – 31:39	3–1
	3–2	33:45 – Geirsdóttir (Blöndal, Ko. Björnsdóttir)
	3–3	59:13 – Šulová (Su. Björgvinsdóttir, Sigfinnsdóttir) (EA)

Hsu Ti. (miss)
Lin (miss)
Tan (miss)
Chao
Shootout
(miss) Šulová
(miss) Blöndal
(miss) Si. Björgvinsdóttir
(miss) Ka. Björnsdóttir
(miss) Su. Björgvinsdóttir
10 min
Penalties
6 min
22
Shots
44

18 April 2026; 19:30	Slovenia	0–2 (0–1, 0–1, 0–0)	Poland	Ledena dvorana, Bled; Attendance: 245

Game reference
Ajda Jošt	Goalies	Nadia Ratajczyk	Referee: (Canada) Audrey-Anne Girard; Linesmen: (Australia) Bethany Bowshall (Italy) Anna Callovini
0–1 / 16:17 – Sikorska; 0–2 / 30:25 – Nosal (SH)			Referee: (Canada) Audrey-Anne Girard; Linesmen: (Australia) Bethany Bowshall (Italy) Anna Callovini
8 min	Penalties	4 min	Referee: (Canada) Audrey-Anne Girard; Linesmen: (Australia) Bethany Bowshall (Italy) Anna Callovini
5	Shots	69	Referee: (Canada) Audrey-Anne Girard; Linesmen: (Australia) Bethany Bowshall (Italy) Anna Callovini

=== Statistics ===
==== Scoring leaders ====
List shows the top skaters sorted by points, then goals.

Player	GP	G	A	Pts	+/−	PIM	POS
(Poland) Karolina Późniewska	5	8	5	13	+11	2	F
(Iceland) Sunna Björgvinsdóttir	5	1	7	8	−1	2	F
(Poland) Dominika Korkuz	5	0	8	8	+10	0	D
(Poland) Magdalena Łąpieś	5	4	3	7	+12	0	F
(Slovenia) Pia Pren	5	4	3	7	+6	0	F
(Poland) Tetiana Onyshchenko	5	2	5	7	+10	0	F
(Chinese Taipei) Huang Yun-chu	5	4	1	5	+2	0	F
(Slovenia) Sara Confidenti	5	4	1	5	+3	2	F
(Chinese Taipei) Chang En-wei	5	0	5	5	−2	2	F
(Australia) Christina Julien	5	3	1	4	+3	4	F

GP = Games played; G = Goals; A = Assists; Pts = Points; +/− = Plus/Minus; PIM = Penalties in Minutes; POS = Position
Source: IIHF.com

==== Goaltending leaders ====
Only the top five goaltenders, based on save percentage, who have played at least 40% of their team's minutes, are included in this list.

Player	TOI	GA	GAA	SA	Sv%	SO
(Poland) Nadia Ratajczyk	220:00	1	0.27	54	98.15	2
(Chinese Taipei) Hsu Tzu-ting	130:00	4	1.85	94	95.74	0
(Australia) Olivia Last	195:31	7	2.15	110	93.64	0
(Slovenia) Ajda Jošt	179:27	9	3.01	140	93.57	0
(Iceland) Andrea Bachmann	241:35	13	3.23	136	90.44	0

TOI = time on ice (minutes:seconds); SA = shots against; GA = goals against; GAA = goals against average; Sv% = save percentage; SO = shutouts
Source: IIHF.com

=== Awards ===
Position	Player
Goaltender	(Chinese Taipei) Hsu Tzu-ting
Defenceman	(Slovenia) Lea Buljeta
Forward	(Poland) Karolina Późniewska

== Group B tournament ==
2026 IIHF Women's World Championship Division II B

Tournament details
- Host country: Hong Kong
- City: Hong Kong
- Venue: 1 (in 1 host city)
- Dates: 30 March – 5 April
- Teams: 6

Tournament statistics
- Games played: 15
- Goals scored: 93 (6.2 per game)
- Attendance: 3,086 (206 per game)
- Scoring leader: (Ukraine) Valeria Manchak (13 points)

Official website
- Website

=== Participants ===
Team	Qualification
Mexico	Placed 6th in 2025 Division II A and was relegated.
New Zealand	Placed 2nd in 2025 Division II B.
Ukraine	Placed 3rd in 2025 Division II B.
Belgium	Placed 4th in 2025 Division II B.
Hong Kong	Host, placed 5th in 2025 Division II B.
Lithuania	Placed 1st in 2025 Division III A and was promoted.

=== Match officials ===
Four referees and seven linesperson were selected for the tournament.

Referees	Linesperson
(China) Song Meina; (Latvia) Sintija Čamane; (Slovakia) Zuzana Rimbalová; (Switzerland) Karin Williner	(United Kingdom) Felicity Munroe; (Japan) Rinka Kubota; (Italy) Daniela Egger; (Netherlands) Amy Keijzers; (New Zealand) Winifred Davis; (Poland) Monika Szpyt-Jucha; (South Korea) Park Jung-yoon

=== Standings ===
Pos	Team	Pld	W	OTW	OTL	L	GF	GA	GD	Pts	Promotion or relegation
1	Hong Kong (H)	5	5	0	0	0	19	7	+12	15	Promotion to the 2027 Division II A
2	Lithuania	5	3	1	0	1	15	11	+4	11	
3	Ukraine	5	3	0	1	1	20	11	+9	10	
4	New Zealand	5	2	0	0	3	15	18	−3	6	
5	Mexico	5	1	0	0	4	14	18	−4	3	
6	Belgium	5	0	0	0	5	10	28	−18	0	Relegation to the 2027 Division III A

Source: IIHF
Rules for classification: 1) points; 2) head-to-head points; 3) head-to-head goal difference; 4) head-to-head number of goals scored; 5) result against closest best-ranked team outside tied teams; 6) result against second-best ranked team outside tied teams; 7) seeding before tournament.
(H) Host

=== Results ===
All times are local (UTC+8).

30 March 2026; 12:30	Ukraine	4–2 (2–0, 1–1, 1–1)	Mexico	DB Ice Rink, Hong Kong; Attendance: 100

Game reference

Yuliana Vilhan
Goalies
Nicole Duenas
Referee:
(Latvia) Sintija Čamane
Linesmen:
(South Korea) Park Jung-yoon
(Poland) Monika Szpyt-Jucha

Liskovych (Nesterenko, Kipria) – 01:42	1–0
Skorokhod – 19:59	2–0
Vedmedenko (Manchak, Kyrychenko) (PP) – 28:56	3–0
	3–1	30:18 – J. Rojas (G. Rojas, Cárdenas)
Skorokhod (Nesterenko, Rozhok) – 41:08	4–1
	4–2	59:04 – J. Rojas (Heon, Duenas)

10 min
Penalties
8 min
30
Shots
43

30 March 2026; 16:00	Lithuania	4–3 (2–1, 1–1, 1–1)	Belgium	DB Ice Rink, Hong Kong; Attendance: 115

Game reference

Viltė Beličenkaitė
Goalies
Charlotte Swinnen
Referee:
(China) Song Meina
Linesmen:
(Italy) Daniela Egger
(United Kingdom) Felicity Munroe

	0–1	11:31 – De Guchtenaere (Steeno)
Petrauskaitė (Stirnaitė) – 13:09	1–1
Miuller (Rakauskaitė) – 14:09	2–1
Stirnaitė (Petrauskaitė, Rakauskaitė) – 28:06	3–1
	3–2	30:01 – Paulissen (Wagemans, Saunders)
Stirnaitė (Kieraitė) – 43:50	4–2
	4–3	52:56 – De Guchtenaere (Steeno)

6 min
Penalties
6 min
46
Shots
28

30 March 2026; 19:30	New Zealand	0–3 (0–0, 0–3, 0–0)	Hong Kong	DB Ice Rink, Hong Kong; Attendance: 300

Game reference

Lochlyn Henry
Goalies
Keira Mok
Referee:
(Switzerland) Karin Williner
Linesmen:
(Netherlands) Amy Keijzers
(Japan) Rinka Kubota

0–1	20:53 – T. Wong (C. Wong, Ng) (PP)
0–2	22:06 – Xu
0–3	31:57 – Yuen (Lee)

4 min
Penalties
2 min
28
Shots
46

31 March 2026; 12:30	Mexico	6–1 (4–0, 1–0, 1–1)	Belgium	DB Ice Rink, Hong Kong; Attendance: 100

Game reference

Miranda De Antunano
Goalies
Anouk Belmans
Referee:
(Slovakia) Zuzana Rimbalová
Linesmen:
(Japan) Rinka Kubota
(Poland) Monika Szpyt-Jucha

Amaya (G. Rojas) – 12:11	1–0
P. Rosales (Nevárez, D. Rosales) – 13:24	2–0
Ayala (PP) – 14:42	3–0
D. Rosales (Nevárez, Almanzán) – 14:59	4–0
Andrade (G. Rojas) – 30:17	5–0
	5–1	45:18 – Bosmans (Steeno, De Guchtenaere) (PP2)
Wilson (P. Rosales, J. Rojas) – 59:56	6–1

10 min
Penalties
12 min
36
Shots
20

31 March 2026; 16:00	New Zealand	2–8 (1–3, 0–5, 1–0)	Ukraine	DB Ice Rink, Hong Kong; Attendance: 125

Game reference

Breane Byck
Goalies
Yuliana Vilhan
Anna Kharivska
Referee:
(Latvia) Sintija Čamane
Linesmen:
(Italy) Daniela Egger
(Netherlands) Amy Keijzers

	0–1	09:19 – Telehina (Manchak)
Horner-Pascoe (Nelson, Lilly) (PP) – 11:56	1–1
	1–2	12:02 – Manchak (Tsymyrenko)
	1–3	14:50 – Telehina (Tsymyrenko, Manchak) (PP)
	1–4	20:24 – Telehina (Manchak) (PP)
	1–5	23:59 – Tsymyrenko (Manchak, Kyrychenko)
	1–6	24:09 – Kipria (Skorokhod)
	1–7	25:51 – Manchak (Shymanska, Rohanova)
	1–8	39:50 – Manchak (Telehina, Tsymyrenko)
Nelson (Horner-Pascoe) – 52:28	2–8

6 min
Penalties
4 min
25
Shots
50

31 March 2026; 19:30	Hong Kong	3–2 (1–1, 1–0, 1–1)	Lithuania	DB Ice Rink, Hong Kong; Attendance: 315

Game reference

Keira Mok
Goalies
Viltė Beličenkaitė
Referee:
(Switzerland) Karin Williner
Linesmen:
(United Kingdom) Felicity Munroe
(South Korea) Park Jung-yoon

Yuen (Cheung) – 08:09	1–0
	1–1	13:32 – Stirnaitė (Miuller)
Ng (SH) – 39:41	2–1
	2–2	55:09 – Petrauskaitė (Stirnaitė, Jasinevičiūtė) (PP)
Ip (Li, Cheung) – 56:09	3–2

6 min
Penalties
8 min
26
Shots
39

2 April 2026; 12:30	New Zealand	1–2 (1–1, 0–1, 0–0)	Lithuania	DB Ice Rink, Hong Kong; Attendance: 125

Game reference

Lochlyn Henry
Goalies
Viltė Beličenkaitė
Referee:
(Slovakia) Zuzana Rimbalová
Linesmen:
(Italy) Daniela Egger
(South Korea) Park Jung-yoon

Mulari (SH) – 17:27	1–0
	1–1	18:29 – Miuller (Tučiūtė, Stirnaitė) (PP)
	1–2	20:42 – Petrauskaitė

10 min
Penalties
6 min
36
Shots
30

2 April 2026; 16:00	Ukraine	5–1 (2–1, 1–0, 2–0)	Belgium	DB Ice Rink, Hong Kong; Attendance: 170

Game reference

Yuliana Vilhan
Goalies
Charlotte Swinnen
Referee:
(China) Song Meina
Linesmen:
(Japan) Rinka Kubota
(United Kingdom) Felicity Munroe

Telehina (Tsymyrenko, Manchak) – 03:58	1–0
Izmailova – 07:28	2–0
	2–1	10:08 – De Guchtenaere (Bosmans, Steeno)
Manchak (Telehina, Kyrychenko) – 34:12	3–1
Kyrychenko – 52:09	4–1
Nesterenko (Skorokhod) – 52:34	5–1

12 min
Penalties
6 min
32
Shots
22

2 April 2026; 19:30	Mexico	0–4 (0–2, 0–2, 0–0)	Hong Kong	DB Ice Rink, Hong Kong; Attendance: 496

Game reference

Nicole Duenas
Goalies
Keira Mok
Referee:
(Latvia) Sintija Čamane
Linesmen:
(Netherlands) Amy Keijzers
(Poland) Monika Szpyt-Jucha

0–1	03:12 – Ng
0–2	11:50 – Yuen (Fong, Xu)
0–3	23:59 – Ip (Cheung, Li)
0–4	24:32 – T. Wong (C. Wong, Ng)

12 min
Penalties
8 min
25
Shots
32

3 April 2026; 12:30	Belgium	1–7 (0–5, 0–1, 1–1)	New Zealand	DB Ice Rink, Hong Kong; Attendance: 196

Game reference

Anouk Belmans
Charlotte Swinnen
Goalies
Breane Byck
Referee:
(Switzerland) Karin Williner
Linesmen:
(United Kingdom) Felicity Munroe
(South Korea) Park Jung-yoon

	0–1	03:03 – Kloss (Gregory, Hollyer)
	0–2	10:19 – Nelson (Vernal)
	0–3	12:23 – Mulari (Shields)
	0–4	15:59 – Hollyer
	0–5	16:28 – Horner-Pascoe (Nelson, Vernal)
	0–6	32:54 – Shattock (Mulari, Shields) (PP)
Goethals (De Guchtenaere, Steeno) (PP) – 45:09	1–6
	1–7	53:28 – Nelson (Vernal]) (PP)

33 min
Penalties
6 min
41
Shots
44

3 April 2026; 16:00	Lithuania	4–2 (1–2, 1–0, 0–2)	Mexico	DB Ice Rink, Hong Kong; Attendance: 162

Game reference

Viltė Beličenkaitė
Goalies
Miranda De Antunano
Referee:
(Slovakia) Zuzana Rimbalová
Linesmen:
(New Zealand) Winifred Davis
(Poland) Monika Szpyt-Jucha

Rastenytė (Stirnaitė, Rakauskaitė) – 06:28	1–0
	1–1	07:25 – J. Rojas (Amaya)
	1–2	12:53 – Amaya (G. Rojas, Ayala)
Miuller (Stirnaitė, Jasinevičiūtė) (PP) – 24:29	2–2
Petrauskaitė (Stirnaitė) – 40:13	3–2
Tučiūtė (Kondratjeva, Jasinevičiūtė) (PP) – 57:54	4–2

6 min
Penalties
8 min
21
Shots
33

3 April 2026; 19:30	Hong Kong	3–1 (0–0, 3–0, 0–1)	Ukraine	DB Ice Rink, Hong Kong; Attendance: 425

Game reference

Keira Mok
Goalies
Yuliana Vilhan
Referee:
(Latvia) Sintija Čamane
Linesmen:
(Italy) Daniela Egger
(Netherlands) Amy Keijzers

Ng (T. Wong, C. Wong) – 27:21	1–0
Ng (Chau) – 34:06	2–0
Ng – 36:12	3–0
	3–1	51:52 – Tsymyrenko (Manchak)

2 min
Penalties
8 min
21
Shots
40

5 April 2026; 12:30	Mexico	4–5 (1–2, 2–3, 1–0)	New Zealand	DB Ice Rink, Hong Kong; Attendance: 116

Game reference

Nicole Duenas
Miranda De Antunano
Goalies
Lochlyn Henry
Referee:
(China) Song Meina
Linesmen:
(Japan) Rinka Kubota
(South Korea) Park Jung-yoon

J. Rojas – 03:41	1–0
	1–1	09:39 – Nelson (Vernal)
	1–2	11:28 – Mulari (Gregory)
	1–3	21:22 – Orr (Nelson, Horner-Pascoe)
Nevárez (P. Rosales, Hagerman) – 22:50	2–3
J. Rojas (Amaya, G. Rojas) – 27:46	3–3
	3–4	34:43 – Horner-Pascoe (Nelson, Lilly)
	3–5	37:33 – Shields (Shattock, Gregory) (PP)
Amaya (Heon, Ayala) (PP) – 45:08	4–5

6 min
Penalties
2 min
43
Shots
18

5 April 2026; 16:00	Ukraine	2–3 GWS (0–1, 2–0, 0–1) (OT: 0–0) (SO: 0–1)	Lithuania	DB Ice Rink, Hong Kong; Attendance: 348

Game reference

Anna Kharivska
Goalies
Viltė Beličenkaitė
Referee:
(Switzerland) Karin Williner
Linesmen:
(Netherlands) Amy Keijzers
(United Kingdom) Felicity Munroe

	0–1	05:22 – Stirnaitė (Miuller)
Manchak (Tsymyrenko) (PP) – 23:09	1–1
Vedmedenko (Telehina, Manchak) (PP) – 26:16	2–1
	2–2	50:43 – Miuller (Tučiūtė) (PP)

Tsymyrenko (miss)
Telehina (miss)
Maifeld (miss)
Manchak (miss)
Shootout
(miss) Rastenytė
(miss) Stirnaitė
(miss) Jasinevičiūtė
Miuller
Tučiūtė
4 min
Penalties
8 min
42
Shots
17

5 April 2026; 19:30	Belgium	4–6 (0–1, 3–3, 1–2)	Hong Kong	DB Ice Rink, Hong Kong; Attendance: 507

Game reference

Anouk Belmans
Goalies
Olivia Lloren
Chau Nga Sze
Referee:
(Slovakia) Zuzana Rimbalová
Linesmen:
(New Zealand) Winifred Davis
(Italy) Daniela Egger

	0–1	02:27 – Tam (SH)
	0–2	24:58 – Ng (C. Wong)
Steeno (De Terwangne, Goethals) – 27:15	1–2
Sommerschuh (Paulissen, Saunders) – 28:12	2–2
	2–3	28:48 – Chau (Li)
Paulissen (Wagemans, Saunders) (PP) – 32:39	3–3
	3–4	33:36 – Yuen (Chim)
	3–5	40:20 – T. Wong (Ng)
	3–6	58:16 – Ng
Van Hoof (De Terwangne) – 59:18	4–6

4 min
Penalties
6 min
23
Shots
27

=== Statistics ===
==== Scoring leaders ====
List shows the top skaters sorted by points, then goals.

Player	GP	G	A	Pts	+/−	PIM	POS
(Ukraine) Valeria Manchak	5	5	8	13	+6	2	F
(Hong Kong) Renee Ng	5	7	3	10	+8	2	F
(Lithuania) Rugilė Stirnaitė	5	4	6	10	+7	6	F
(New Zealand) Kellye Nelson	5	4	4	8	+3	4	F
(Ukraine) Polina Telehina	5	4	3	7	+6	2	F
(Ukraine) Daria Tsymyrenko	5	2	5	7	+6	0	F
(Mexico) Joanna Rojas	5	5	1	6	+2	6	F
(Lithuania) Klara Miuller	5	4	2	6	+4	4	F
(Belgium) Anke Steeno	5	1	5	6	−5	12	F
(Lithuania) Gabija Petrauskaitė	5	4	1	5	+3	0	F

GP = Games played; G = Goals; A = Assists; Pts = Points; +/− = Plus/Minus; PIM = Penalties in Minutes; POS = Position
Source: IIHF.com

==== Goaltending leaders ====
Only the top five goaltenders, based on save percentage, who have played at least 40% of their team's minutes, are included in this list.

Player	TOI	GA	GAA	SA	Sv%	SO
(Hong Kong) Keira Mok	240:00	3	0.75	129	97.73	2
(Ukraine) Yuliana Vilhan	218:16	7	1.92	94	93.07	0
(Lithuania) Viltė Beličenkaitė	303:15	11	2.18	141	92.76	0
(New Zealand) Lochlyn Henry	179:53	9	3.00	104	92.04	0
(New Zealand) Breane Byck	120:00	9	4.50	82	90.11	0

TOI = time on ice (minutes:seconds); SA = shots against; GA = goals against; GAA = goals against average; Sv% = save percentage; SO = shutouts
Source: IIHF.com

=== Awards ===
Position	Player
Goaltender	(Hong Kong) Keira Mok
Defenceman	(Lithuania) Emilija Tučiūtė
Forward	(Ukraine) Valeria Manchak
