= 2026 IIHF Women's World Championship Division III =

Tournament details
- Host countries: Croatia; Estonia
- Venues: 2 (in 2 host cities)
- Dates: 23 February – 1 March; 28 February – 6 March
- Teams: 12

The 2026 IIHF Women's World Championship Division III comprised two international ice hockey tournaments of the 2026 Women's Ice Hockey World Championships organised by the International Ice Hockey Federation (IIHF).

Group A was held in Zagreb, Croatia from 23 February to 1 March 2026 and Group B in Kohtla-Järve, Estonia, from 28 February to 6 March 2026.

Romania won Group A and was promoted while Bulgaria was relegated. Estonia captured promotion by winning the Group B tournament.

== Group A tournament ==
2026 IIHF Women's World Championship Division III A

Tournament details
- Host country: Croatia
- City: Zagreb
- Venue: 1 (in 1 host city)
- Dates: 23 February – 1 March
- Teams: 6

Tournament statistics
- Games played: 15
- Goals scored: 86 (5.73 per game)
- Attendance: 1,309 (87 per game)
- Scoring leader: (Thailand) Ratana Kajonsaksumet (12 points)

Official website
- Website

=== Participants ===
Team	Qualification
Turkey	Placed 6th in Division II B and was relegated.
Thailand	Placed 2nd in 2025 Division III A.
Serbia	Placed 3rd in 2025 Division III A.
Romania	Placed 4th in 2025 Division III A.
Croatia	Host, placed 5th in 2025 Division III A.
Bulgaria	Placed 1st in 2025 Division III B and was promoted.

=== Match officials ===
Four referees and seven linesperson were selected for the tournament.

Referees	Linesperson
(Hungary) Bernadett Holzer; (Japan) Mai Mizuhori; (Lithuania) Ramunė Maleckienė; (Mexico) María Chávez	(Austria) Manuela Lehnhart; (Finland) Mari Hauhia; (France) Erin Delavenna; (United Kingdom) Ellen Key; (Italy) Mara De Rech; (Kazakhstan) Elvira Dairova; (United Arab Emirates) Fatima Al-Ali

=== Standings ===
Pos	Team	Pld	W	OTW	OTL	L	GF	GA	GD	Pts	Promotion or relegation
1	Romania	5	3	1	0	1	18	9	+9	11	Promoted to the 2027 Division II B
2	Thailand	5	3	0	1	1	15	13	+2	10	
3	Turkey	5	3	0	0	2	14	15	−1	9	
4	Croatia (H)	5	2	1	0	2	16	11	+5	8	
5	Serbia	5	0	1	2	2	13	18	−5	4	
6	Bulgaria	5	0	1	1	3	10	20	−10	3	Relegated to the 2027 Division III B

Source: IIHF
Rules for classification: 1) points; 2) head-to-head points; 3) head-to-head goal difference; 4) head-to-head number of goals scored; 5) result against closest best-ranked team outside tied teams; 6) result against second-best ranked team outside tied teams; 7) seeding before tournament.
(H) Host

=== Results ===
All times are local (UTC+2).

23 February 2026; 12:30	Serbia	2–4 (1–0, 1–1, 0–3)	Turkey	Admiral Ice Dome, Zagreb; Attendance: 27

Game reference

Ana Ilić
Goalies
Azra Sert
Referee:
(Hungary) Bernadett Holzer
Linesmen:
(France) Erin Delavenna
(United Kingdom) Ellen Key

Vrhoci (Velček, J. Radović) – 18:48	1–0
Vastag – 28:40	2–0
	2–1	36:08 – Kuchkin (Çakmak) (PP)
	2–2	45:11 – Lökbaş (Eraşçı)
	2–3	45:54 – Yavuz
	2–4	55:22 – Tandoğan (Arslan, Çağdaş)

8 min
Penalties
2 min
21
Shots
32

23 February 2026; 16:00	Bulgaria	1–5 (0–1, 1–0, 0–4)	Romania	Admiral Ice Dome, Zagreb; Attendance: 31

Game reference

Angelina Dimova
Goalies
Nicoleta Șabalin
Referee:
(Lithuania) Ramunė Maleckienė
Linesmen:
(Finland) Mari Hauhia
(Austria) Manuela Lehnhart

	0–1	04:05 – Voicu
Asparuhova (Georgieva, Zlateva) – 23:03	1–1
	1–2	41:01 – Feher (Voicu, Platica)
	1–3	42:25 – Szekeres
	1–4	52:18 – Szekeres (Bende) (PP)
	1–5	59:49 – Vitos (EN)

6 min
Penalties
0 min
13
Shots
49

23 February 2026; 19:30	Thailand	2–1 (0–0, 0–1, 2–0)	Croatia	Admiral Ice Dome, Zagreb; Attendance: 81

Game reference

Thamida Kunthadapakorn
Goalies
Klara Kolar
Referee:
(Mexico) María Chávez
Linesmen:
(United Arab Emirates) Fatima Al-Ali
(Kazakhstan) Elvira Dairova

	0–1	29:05 – Bauman (Vlašić, Soldić)
Vorawat (Satityathiwat, Thamma) – 49:34	1–1
Pothong (Kajonsaksumet, Satityathiwat (PP) – 53:14	2–1

4 min
Penalties
14 min
30
Shots
22

24 February 2026; 12:30	Turkey	4–3 (1–1, 2–0, 1–2)	Romania	Admiral Ice Dome, Zagreb; Attendance: 17

Game reference

Azra Sert
Goalies
Nadina Niciu
Nicoleta Șabalin
Referee:
(Lithuania) Ramunė Maleckienė
Linesmen:
(Italy) Mara De Rech
(United Kingdom) Ellen Key

	0–1	02:37 – Voicu (PP)
Şenyuva – 05:49	1–1
Tandoğan (Daş) (PP) – 21:48	2–1
Çakmak (Kuchkin, Yavuz) (PP) – 37:11	3–1
	3–2	44:50 – Bende (Bálint)
	3–3	51:50 – Platica (Bende)
Demir (Kuchkin) – 55:43	4–3

6 min
Penalties
8 min
32
Shots
39

24 February 2026; 16:00	Thailand	3–4 GWS (0–1, 2–1, 1–1) (OT: 0–0) (SO: 0–1)	Serbia	Admiral Ice Dome, Zagreb; Attendance: 38

Game reference

Thamida Kunthadapakorn
Goalies
Ana Ilić
Referee:
(Hungary) Bernadett Holzer
Linesmen:
(United Arab Emirates) Fatima Al-Ali
(Austria) Manuela Lehnhart

	0–1	06:18 – Vukelić (Vidaković)
Kajonsaksumet – 21:26	1–1
Wongsanit (Poka) – 21:42	2–1
	2–2	37:11 – Vastag (Vasiljević)
Panyamaneerat (Kajonsaksumet, Thamma) (PP) – 46:14	3–2
	3–3	47:47 – J. Vukelić (Benčić)

Kajonsaksumet (miss)
Panyamaneerat (miss)
Thamma
Satityathiwat (miss)
Wongsanit (miss)
Kajonsaksumet (miss)
Panyamaneerat (miss)
Thamma
Pothong (miss)
Satityathiwat (miss)
Kajonsaksumet
Panyamaneerat (miss)
Shootout
(miss) Vrhoci
(miss) J. Vukelić
Vastag
(miss) Vasiljević
(miss) Velček
(miss) Vastag
(miss) Vrhoci
Vukelić
(miss) Vukelić
(miss) Popov
Velček
Vastag
4 min
Penalties
8 min
41
Shots
29

24 February 2026; 19:30	Croatia	2–1 GWS (1–1, 0–0, 0–0) (OT: 0–0) (SO: 1–0)	Bulgaria	Admiral Ice Dome, Zagreb; Attendance: 105

Game reference
Klara Kolar	Goalies	Monika Nedyalkova	Referee: (Japan) Mai Mizuhori; Linesmen: (France) Erin Delavenna (Finland) Mari Hauhia
/ 0–1 / 04:01 – Stoyanova (Runevska, Zlateva); Stiperski (Fabić, Vugić) – 16:09 / 1–1			Referee: (Japan) Mai Mizuhori; Linesmen: (France) Erin Delavenna (Finland) Mari Hauhia
Matić; Bauman; Soldić (miss); Stolar	Shootout	(miss) Ivanova; Runevska; (miss) Asparuhova; (miss) Stoyanova	Referee: (Japan) Mai Mizuhori; Linesmen: (France) Erin Delavenna (Finland) Mari Hauhia
4 min	Penalties	2 min	Referee: (Japan) Mai Mizuhori; Linesmen: (France) Erin Delavenna (Finland) Mari Hauhia
50	Shots	15	Referee: (Japan) Mai Mizuhori; Linesmen: (France) Erin Delavenna (Finland) Mari Hauhia

26 February 2026; 12:30	Thailand	7–4 (2–1, 2–3, 3–0)	Bulgaria	Admiral Ice Dome, Zagreb; Attendance: 41

Game reference

Thamida Kunthadapakorn
Natthaporn Nakdee
Goalies
Angelina Dimova
Monika Nedyalkova
Referee:
(Japan) Mai Mizuhori
Linesmen:
(United Kingdom) Ellen Key
(Austria) Manuela Lehnhart

	0–1	05:49 – Asparuhova (Dikova, Stoyanova)
Kajonsaksumet (Charusakulariyakul, Wongsanit) – 11:41	1–1
Kajonsaksumet (Wongsanit, Charusakulariyakul) – 13:13	2–1
Panyamaneerat (Satityathiwat, Kajonsaksumet) – 22:15	3–1
Kajonsaksumet (Panyamaneerat, Poka) – 28:17	4–1
	4–2	32:20 – Ivanova (Runevska) (SH)
	4–3	34:48 – Ivanova (Runevska)
	4–4	37:54 – Stoyanova (Asparuhova, Ivanova)
Wongsanit (Kajonsaksumet, Charusakulariyakul) – 42:05	5–4
Kajonsaksumet (Sakchaicharoenkul, Wongsanit) – 45:07	6–4
Wongsanit (Satityathiwat, Charusakulariyakul) (PP) – 52:02	7–4

4 min
Penalties
6 min
49
Shots
23

26 February 2026; 16:00	Serbia	2–3 GWS (1–1, 0–1, 1–0) (OT: 0–0) (SO: 0–1)	Romania	Admiral Ice Dome, Zagreb; Attendance: 46

Game reference

Ana Ilić
Goalies
Nicoleta Șabalin
Referee:
(Mexico) María Chávez
Linesmen:
(Kazakhstan) Elvira Dairova
(Finland) Mari Hauhia

	0–1	08:32 – Voicu (Feher, Platica)
Vasiljević – 17:24	1–1
	1–2	29:56 – Vitos (Vasile, Pethõ)
Sekulić (Milišić, Popov) – 53:19	2–2

Vastag (miss)
Vukelić (miss)
Velček (miss)
Vrhoci
Vasiljević (miss)
Shootout
(miss) Șabalin
Vitos
Platica
(miss) Feher
8 min
Penalties
8 min
35
Shots
28

26 February 2026; 19:30	Turkey	0–6 (0–0, 0–4, 0–2)	Croatia	Admiral Ice Dome, Zagreb; Attendance: 173

Game reference

Azra Sert
Beray Okut
Goalies
Klara Kolar
Referee:
(Lithuania) Ramunė Maleckienė
Linesmen:
(United Arab Emirates) Fatima Al-Ali
(Italy) Mara De Rech

0–1	32:37 – Soldić (Matić, Bauman)
0–2	35:10 – Vugić (Stolar, Soldić) (PP)
0–3	36:45 – Soldić (SH)
0–4	38:59 – Stolar
0–5	44:54 – Soldić (Bauman, Stolar) (PP)
0–6	54:47 – Matić (Soldić, Gašljević) (PP)

12 min
Penalties
16 min
17
Shots
34

27 February 2026; 12:30	Romania	2–0 (0–0, 0–0, 2–0)	Thailand	Admiral Ice Dome, Zagreb; Attendance: 22

Game reference
Nadina Niciu	Goalies	Thamida Kunthadapakorn	Referee: (Mexico) María Chávez; Linesmen: (Italy) Mara De Rech (United Kingdom) Ellen Key
Pethõ (Simina) – 42:24 / 1–0; Bende (Csiszér, Șabalin) – 55:22 / 2–0			Referee: (Mexico) María Chávez; Linesmen: (Italy) Mara De Rech (United Kingdom) Ellen Key
4 min	Penalties	2 min	Referee: (Mexico) María Chávez; Linesmen: (Italy) Mara De Rech (United Kingdom) Ellen Key
29	Shots	26	Referee: (Mexico) María Chávez; Linesmen: (Italy) Mara De Rech (United Kingdom) Ellen Key

27 February 2026; 16:00	Bulgaria	1–4 (1–0, 0–3, 0–1)	Turkey	Admiral Ice Dome, Zagreb; Attendance: 44

Game reference

Monika Nedyalkova
Goalies
Azra Sert
Referee:
(Hungary) Bernadett Holzer
Linesmen:
(Kazakhstan) Elvira Dairova
(France) Erin Delavenna

Runevska (Georgieva) (PP) – 09:37	1–0
	1–1	30:55 – Yavuz (Tandoğan, Daş) (PP)
	1–2	32:32 – Kuchkin (Lökbaş) (PP2)
	1–3	38:10 – Lökbaş (Kuchkin)
	1–4	43:42 – Arslan (Tandoğan, Şenyuva)

14 min
Penalties
8 min
24
Shots
40

27 February 2026; 19:30	Croatia	5–3 (1–2, 3–1, 1–0)	Serbia	Admiral Ice Dome, Zagreb; Attendance: 311

Game reference

Klara Kolar
Goalies
Ana Ilić
Referee:
(Japan) Mai Mizuhori
Linesmen:
(Finland) Mari Hauhia
(Austria) Manuela Lehnhart

Stolar (Marinković) (PP) – 16:47	1–0
	1–1	18:09 – Vrhoci (Vukelić, T. Radović)
	1–2	19:12 – Velček (Vukelić, J. Radović)
Bauman (Gašljević, Soldić) (PP) – 23:14	2–2
	2–3	23:48 – Popov (Vrhoci, Vasiljević)
Bauman (Gašljević, Soldić) – 24:11	3–3
Vukelić (Čavka, M. Stiperski) – 34:45	4–3
Marinković (P. Stiperski) (EN) – 58:19	5–3

0 min
Penalties
10 min
38
Shots
22

1 March 2026; 12:30	Turkey	2–3 (1–1, 1–2, 0–0)	Thailand	Admiral Ice Dome, Zagreb; Attendance: 42

Game reference

Azra Sert
Goalies
Natthaporn Nakdee
Referee:
(Mexico) María Chávez
Linesmen:
(Kazakhstan) Elvira Dairova
(Finland) Mari Hauhia

	0–1	06:49 – Sakchaicharoenkul (Kajonsaksumet)
Kuchkin (Lökbaş) – 07:20	1–1
	1–2	21:41 – Kajonsaksumet (Panyamaneerat, Charusakulariyakul)
Lökbaş (Şenyuva) – 29:54	2–2
	2–3	38:21 – Pothong (Thamma, Kajonsaksumet)

0 min
Penalties
4 min
20
Shots
35

1 March 2026; 16:00	Serbia	2–3 OT (0–1, 1–0, 1–1) (OT: 0–1)	Bulgaria	Admiral Ice Dome, Zagreb; Attendance: 74

Game reference

Ana Ilić
Goalies
Angelina Dimova
Referee:
(Hungary) Bernadett Holzer
Linesmen:
(France) Erin Delavenna
(Austria) Manuela Lehnhart

	0–1	03:55 – Ivanova (Runevska)
Vasiljević (Vukelić) – 38:54	1–1
Sekulić (Vukelić, Vasiljević) – 54:11	2–1
	2–2	56:08 – Ivanova (Runevska)
	2–3	64:20 – Runevska

10 min
Penalties
6 min
36
Shots
50

1 March 2026; 19:30	Romania	5–2 (3–0, 1–0, 1–2)	Croatia	Admiral Ice Dome, Zagreb; Attendance: 257

Game reference

Nadina Niciu
Goalies
Klara Kolar
Referee:
(Japan) Mai Mizuhori
Linesmen:
(United Arab Emirates) Fatima Al-Ali
(Italy) Mara De Rech

Feher (Bende) – 02:46	1–0
Vitos (Simina) – 11:42	2–0
Voicu (Bálint) – 15:05	3–0
Csiszér (Bende) – 37:49	4–0
	4–1	47:31 – Stolar (PP)
	4–2	48:20 – Soldić (Vlašić, Matić)
Simina (Vitos, Csiszér) (PP) – 58:56	5–2

10 min
Penalties
10 min
28
Shots
39

=== Statistics ===
==== Scoring leaders ====
List shows the top skaters sorted by points, then goals.

Player	GP	G	A	Pts	+/−	PIM	POS
(Thailand) Ratana Kajonsaksumet	5	6	6	12	+8	0	F
(Croatia) Petra Soldić	5	4	5	9	+1	2	F
(Bulgaria) Maria Runevska	5	2	5	7	−1	2	F
(Turkey) Alara Kuchkin	5	3	3	6	0	2	D
(Thailand) Ornrawee Wongsanit	5	3	3	6	+2	2	F
(Romania) Julia Bende	5	2	4	6	+3	2	F
(Serbia) Jana Vukelić	5	2	4	6	+3	6	F
(Bulgaria) Lena Ivanova	5	4	1	5	−1	0	F
(Romania) Ana Voicu	5	4	1	5	+4	8	F
(Croatia) Ana Bauman	5	3	2	5	0	2	F

GP = Games played; G = Goals; A = Assists; Pts = Points; +/− = Plus/Minus; PIM = Penalties in Minutes; POS = Position
Source: IIHF.com

==== Goaltending leaders ====
Only the top five goaltenders, based on save percentage, who have played at least 40% of their team's minutes, are included in this list.

Player	TOI	GA	GAA	SA	Sv%	SO
(Romania) Nadina Niciu	160:00	5	1.88	90	94.44	1
(Bulgaria) Monika Nedyalkova	156:43	8	3.06	116	93.10	0
(Romania) Nicoleta Șabalin	145:00	4	1.66	50	92.00	0
(Serbia) Ana Ilić	313:47	16	3.06	197	91.88	0
(Bulgaria) Angelina Dimova	149:51	10	4.00	105	90.48	0

TOI = time on ice (minutes:seconds); SA = shots against; GA = goals against; GAA = goals against average; Sv% = save percentage; SO = shutouts
Source: IIHF.com

=== Awards ===
Position	Player
Goaltender	(Romania) Nadina Niciu
Defenceman	(Turkey) Alara Kuchkin
Forward	(Croatia) Petra Soldić

== Group B tournament ==
2026 IIHF Women's World Championship Division III B

Tournament details
- Host country: Estonia
- City: Kohtla-Järve
- Venue: 1 (in 1 host city)
- Dates: 28 February – 6 March
- Teams: 6

Tournament statistics
- Games played: 15
- Goals scored: 109 (7.27 per game)
- Attendance: 5,041 (336 per game)
- Scoring leader: (Estonia) Aleksandra Stolyarova (20 points)

Official website
- Website

=== Participants ===
Team	Qualification
South Africa	Placed 6th in 2025 Division III A and was relegated.
Israel	Placed 2nd in 2025 Division III B.
Estonia	Host, placed 3rd in 2025 Division III B.
Bosnia and Herzegovina	Placed 4th in 2025 Division III B.
Singapore	Placed 5th in 2025 Division III B.
Philippines	First time participating.

=== Match officials ===
Four referees and seven linesperson were selected for the tournament.

Referees	Linesperson
(Iceland) Elva Hjálmarsdóttir; (Latvia) Sintija Čamane; (Latvia) Baiba Gvozdeva; (Sweden) Elin Benn	(China) Fu Zhennan; (Estonia) Kaire Leet; (Lithuania) Greta Vincaitytė; (Mexico) Lucero González; (Serbia) Dana Ilić; (South Africa) Jessica Stanton; (Singapore) Serena Tsang

=== Standings ===
Pos	Team	Pld	W	OTW	OTL	L	GF	GA	GD	Pts	Promotion
1	Estonia (H)	5	5	0	0	0	37	3	+34	15	Promoted to the 2027 Division III A
2	Bosnia and Herzegovina	5	4	0	0	1	25	12	+13	12	
3	South Africa	5	2	0	0	3	11	14	−3	6 (Note: South Africa 3 Pts, +1 GD; Israel 3 Pts, 0 GD; Philippines 3 Pts, −1 GD.)	
4	Israel	5	2	0	0	3	19	12	+7	6	
5	Philippines	5	2	0	0	3	15	19	−4	6	
6	Singapore	5	0	0	0	5	2	49	−47	0	

Source: IIHF
Rules for classification: 1) points; 2) head-to-head points; 3) head-to-head goal difference; 4) head-to-head number of goals scored; 5) result against closest best-ranked team outside tied teams; 6) result against second-best ranked team outside tied teams; 7) seeding before tournament.
(H) Host

=== Results ===
All times are local (UTC+2).

28 February 2026; 12:30	Philippines	4–6 (0–1, 2–2, 2–3)	Bosnia and Herzegovina	Kohtla-Järve Ice Hall, Kohtla-Järve; Attendance: 116

Game reference

Rosalyn Lim
Goalies
Amra Zubčević
Referee:
(Iceland) Elva Hjálmarsdóttir
Linesmen:
(China) Fu Zhennan
(Estonia) Kaire Leet

	0–1	06:43 – Krupalija (Karamehmedović, Muharemović) (PP)
	0–2	21:26 – Karamehmedović (Lincender, Krupalija) (PP)
	0–3	28:29 – L. Zubčević (PP)
Tan (Javier) – 34:26	1–3
Sanchez (Pagdato) – 35:23	2–3
	2–4	40:26 – Lincender
Alcido – 48:56	3–4
	3–5	53:00 – Lincender (L. Zubčević)
Cuevas (Alcido) – 55:33	4–5
	4–6	59:14 – Vranešić (SH, EN)

10 min
Penalties
12 min
42
Shots
28

28 February 2026; 16:00	Estonia	7–0 (2–0, 3–0, 2–0)	South Africa	Kohtla-Järve Ice Hall, Kohtla-Järve; Attendance: 738

Game reference

Sofia Salamatina
Goalies
Akaisha McNamara
Referee:
(Sweden) Elin Benn
Linesmen:
(Mexico) Lucero González
(Lithuania) Greta Vincaitytė

Stolyarova – 08:11	1–0
Prants (Stolyarova, Koger) – 15:28	2–0
Koger – 30:10	3–0
Stolyarova (Prants, Hollo) – 36:23	4–0
Ebber (Belyankina, Väliste) – 38:39	5–0
Gelencser – 41:13	6–0
Väliste (Bilorus) – 58:56	7–0

4 min
Penalties
8 min
38
Shots
24

28 February 2026; 19:30	Israel	11–0 (2–0, 3–0, 6–0)	Singapore	Kohtla-Järve Ice Hall, Kohtla-Järve; Attendance: 176

Game reference

Yael Fatiev
Bisan Maree
Goalies
Qina Foo
Faith Lee
Referee:
(Latvia) Sintija Čamane
Linesmen:
(South Africa) Jessica Stanton
(Singapore) Serena Tsang

Leshem (S. Kotler, C. Kotler) – 00:45	1–0
Leshem (Sigalov) – 04:09	2–0
Leshem (C. Kotler, S. Kotler) – 25:14	3–0
Armoza (Landa) – 38:29	4–0
Leshem (S. Kotler, Basov) – 39:16	5–0
Basov – 44:56	6–0
S. Kotler (Basov) (PP) – 49:55	7–0
Leshem – 55:01	8–0
Sharabi (Landa, Armoza) – 57:00	9–0
Leshem (S. Kotler) (PP) – 58:23	10–0
C. Kotler (Leshem) – 59:06	11–0

4 min
Penalties
4 min
53
Shots
12

1 March 2026; 12:30	South Africa	2–3 (0–0, 1–3, 1–0)	Bosnia and Herzegovina	Kohtla-Järve Ice Hall, Kohtla-Järve; Attendance: 115

Game reference

Sone Geldenhuys
Goalies
Amra Zubčević
Referee:
(Latvia) Baiba Gvozdeva
Linesmen:
(Serbia) Dana Ilić
(Lithuania) Greta Vincaitytė

	0–1	20:37 – Mulazimović (Karamehmedović, Lincender) (PP)
Rhode (Venter, Lechtanski) – 20:56	1–1
	1–2	28:01 – Lincender
	1–3	35:28 – Karamehmedović (Mulazimović)
Jamieson (Retief) – 43:52	2–3

10 min
Penalties
4 min
22
Shots
20

1 March 2026; 16:00	Israel	1–4 (1–1, 0–0, 0–3)	Estonia	Kohtla-Järve Ice Hall, Kohtla-Järve; Attendance: 798

Game reference

Yael Fatiev
Goalies
Sofia Salamatina
Referee:
(Iceland) Elva Hjálmarsdóttir
Linesmen:
(Mexico) Lucero González
(Singapore) Serena Tsang

	0–1	00:54 – Stolyarova (Vont)
Leshem (S. Kotler, Basov) – 10:29	1–1
	1–2	52:17 – Prants (Stolyarova) (PP)
	1–3	57:04 – Stolyarova (Prants, Geller) (EN)
	1–4	58:33 – Geller (Vont) (EN)

6 min
Penalties
4 min
23
Shots
43

1 March 2026; 19:30	Singapore	0–8 (0–2, 0–2, 0–4)	Philippines	Kohtla-Järve Ice Hall, Kohtla-Järve; Attendance: 96

Game reference

Qina Foo
Goalies
Mikaella Lee
Referee:
(Sweden) Elin Benn
Linesmen:
(China) Fu Zhennan
(South Africa) Jessica Stanton

0–1	17:32 – Alcido
0–2	18:42 – Alcido
0–3	20:53 – Regencia (Alcido)
0–4	32:27 – Cuevas (Alcido, Regencia)
0–5	40:45 – Regencia (Cuevas, Ganac)
0–6	42:42 – Tan (Alcido, Cuevas)
0–7	43:06 – Alcido (Go, Cuevas)
0–8	45:52 – Alcido (Cuevas, Tan)

0 min
Penalties
2 min
7
Shots
61

3 March 2026; 12:30	South Africa	5–1 (0–0, 1–0, 4–1)	Singapore	Kohtla-Järve Ice Hall, Kohtla-Järve; Attendance: 118

Game reference

Akaisha McNamara
Goalies
Qina Foo
Referee:
(Latvia) Baiba Gvozdeva
Linesmen:
(South Africa) Jessica Stanton
(Lithuania) Greta Vincaitytė

Venter (Albertyn, Botha) – 39:02	1–0
	1–1	41:54 – Yeoh
Rhode (Von Doesburgh) – 45:14	2–1
Rhode (Venter, Von Doesburgh) – 50:43	3–1
Venter (Albertyn, Rhode) – 57:52	4–1
Els (D'Oliveira) – 59:25	5–1

4 min
Penalties
0 min
54
Shots
5

3 March 2026; 16:00	Israel	3–1 (0–1, 1–0, 2–0)	Philippines	Kohtla-Järve Ice Hall, Kohtla-Järve; Attendance: 187

Game reference

Yael Fatiev
Goalies
Rosalyn Lim
Referee:
(Iceland) Elva Hjálmarsdóttir
Linesmen:
(Estonia) Kaire Leet
(Singapore) Serena Tsang

	0–1	08:41 – Alcido
Armoza (Sigalov) – 35:23	1–1
Leshem – 47:12	2–1
Leshem (Basov) – 57:03	3–1

6 min
Penalties
2 min
28
Shots
35

3 March 2026; 19:30	Estonia	3–1 (2–0, 1–0, 0–1)	Bosnia and Herzegovina	Kohtla-Järve Ice Hall, Kohtla-Järve; Attendance: 574

Game reference

Sofia Salamatina
Goalies
Amra Zubčević
Referee:
(Latvia) Sintija Čamane
Linesmen:
(China) Fu Zhennan
(Serbia) Dana Ilić

Geller (Prants, Lauk-Gurtovoi) – 15:26	1–0
Stolyarova (Ebber, Demina) – 19:14	2–0
Ebber (Koger) – 25:02	3–0
	3–1	55:41 – Lincender (PP)

4 min
Penalties
6 min
24
Shots
26

4 March 2026; 12:30	Philippines	2–1 (0–0, 1–0, 1–1)	South Africa	Kohtla-Järve Ice Hall, Kohtla-Järve; Attendance: 153

Game reference

Mikaella Lee
Goalies
Sone Geldenhuys
Referee:
(Latvia) Baiba Gvozdeva
Linesmen:
(China) Fu Zhennan
(Mexico) Lucero González

Alcido – 27:50	1–0
Jimenez (Pagdato, Pe Aguirre) – 53:13	2–0
	2–1	56:12 – Lechtanski (Von Doesburgh) (SH)

4 min
Penalties
4 min
18
Shots
22

4 March 2026; 16:00	Bosnia and Herzegovina	4–3 (0–2, 1–1, 3–0)	Israel	Kohtla-Järve Ice Hall, Kohtla-Järve; Attendance: 205

Game reference

Yael Fatiev
Goalies
Amra Zubčević
Referee:
(Sweden) Elin Benn
Linesmen:
(Serbia) Dana Ilić
(South Africa) Jessica Stanton

	0–1	09:38 – Armoza (S. Kotler)
	0–2	10:10 – Leshem
Lincender (L. Zubčević) – 25:11	1–2
	1–3	39:55 – Leshem (SH)
Karamehmedović (Lincender, L. Zubčević) (PP) – 40:35	2–3
L. Zubčević (Vranešić, Lincender) (PP) – 51:27	3–3
Lincender – 57:57	4–3

4 min
Penalties
8 min
35
Shots
16

4 March 2026; 19:30	Singapore	1–14 (0–4, 0–7, 1–3)	Estonia	Kohtla-Järve Ice Hall, Kohtla-Järve; Attendance: 478

Game reference

Qina Foo
Faith Lee
Goalies
Uljana Jeggi
Referee:
(Latvia) Sintija Čamane
Linesmen:
(Estonia) Kaire Leet
(Lithuania) Greta Vincaitytė

	0–1	00:15 – Stolyarova (Geller)
	0–2	02:56 – Stolyarova (Koger) (PP)
	0–3	10:12 – Sarko (Väliste, Bilorus)
	0–4	13:25 – Stolyarova (Stetski, Prants)
	0–5	23:45 – Stolyarova (Vont, Geller) (SH)
	0–6	24:03 – Gelencser (Stolyarova) (SH)
	0–7	29:23 – Sarko (Demina, Reiter)
	0–8	30:08 – Prants (Geller, Stolyarova)
	0–9	32:51 – Lauk-Gurtovoi (Reiter, Demina)
	0–10	34:41 – Sarko (Koger)
	0–11	37:49 – Stolyarova
G. Tan (N. Tan, Jin) (PP) – 42:18	1–11
	1–12	42:54 – Reiter (Demina, Vont)
	1–13	44:22 – Sarko (Bilorus, Stolyarova)
	1–14	46:20 – Reiter (Kovaljova, Demina)

2 min
Penalties
6 min
6
Shots
71

6 March 2026; 12:30	Bosnia and Herzegovina	11–0 (4–0, 3–0, 4–0)	Singapore	Kohtla-Järve Ice Hall, Kohtla-Järve; Attendance: 145

Game reference

Asja Abdomerović
Goalies
Faith Lee
Referee:
(Iceland) Elva Hjálmarsdóttir
Linesmen:
(Mexico) Lucero González
(Singapore) Serena Tsang

Puzić (L. Zubčević, Posavec) – 01:06	1–0
Nikolić (Vranešić) – 04:09	2–0
L. Zubčević – 05:40	3–0
Posavec – 12:55	4–0
Lincender (Vranešić) – 27:08	5–0
Lincender (Krupalija) (PP) – 28:16	6–0
Lincender (Kučević) – 39:58	7–0
L. Zubčević (Karamehmedović) – 43:45	8–0
Lincender – 44:31	9–0
Lincender – 50:07	10–0
L. Zubčević (Puzić) – 58:21	11–0

2 min
Penalties
2 min
47
Shots
4

6 March 2026; 16:00	South Africa	3–1 (1–0, 2–0, 0–1)	Israel	Kohtla-Järve Ice Hall, Kohtla-Järve; Attendance: 273

Game reference

Sone Geldenhuys
Goalies
Yael Fatiev
Referee:
(Latvia) Sintija Čamane
Linesmen:
(China) Fu Zhennan
(Serbia) Dana Ilić

Albertyn (Rhode) – 02:33	1–0
Albertyn (Rhode) (PP) – 30:30	2–0
Venter (Els, Lechtanski) (PP) – 33:29	3–0
	3–1	58:27 – Leshem (Basov)

8 min
Penalties
4 min
36
Shots
21

6 March 2026; 19:30	Estonia	9–0 (4–0, 2–0, 3–0)	Philippines	Kohtla-Järve Ice Hall, Kohtla-Järve; Attendance: 869

Game reference

Uljana Jeggi
Goalies
Rosalyn Lim
Mikaella Lee
Referee:
(Latvia) Baiba Gvozdeva
Linesmen:
(Estonia) Kaire Leet
(South Africa) Jessica Stanton

Sarko (Vont) – 04:10	1–0
Stolyarova – 06:35	2–0
Stolyarova (Geller, Koger) (PP) – 17:28	3–0
Geller (Stetski, Stolyarova) – 19:58	4–0
Sarko – 31:26	5–0
Ebber (Reiter, Gelencser) – 39:29	6–0
Stolyarova – 43:55	7–0
Ebber (Demina) – 45:38	8–0
Stolyarova – 53:03	9–0

2 min
Penalties
2 min
35
Shots
23

=== Statistics ===
==== Scoring leaders ====
List shows the top skaters sorted by points, then goals.

Player	GP	G	A	Pts	+/−	PIM	POS
(Estonia) Aleksandra Stolyarova	5	14	6	20	+19	2	F
(Bosnia and Herzegovina) Ava Lincender	5	11	4	15	+7	0	F
(Israel) Lior Leshem	5	12	1	13	+10	0	D
(Philippines) Jasmin Alcido	5	7	4	9	+7	0	F
(Bosnia and Herzegovina) Lamija Zubčević	5	5	4	9	+6	0	F
(Estonia) Amalia Geller	5	3	5	8	+16	0	F
(Estonia) Olesja Prants	5	3	4	7	+14	0	F
(Israel) Shani Kotler	5	1	6	7	+9	0	F
(Estonia) Ksenia Sarko	5	6	0	6	+9	2	F
(Bosnia and Herzegovina) Ema Karamehmedović	5	3	3	6	+1	0	F
(South Africa) Dalene Rhode	5	3	3	6	+2	12	F

GP = Games played; G = Goals; A = Assists; Pts = Points; +/− = Plus/Minus; PIM = Penalties in Minutes; POS = Position
Source: IIHF.com

==== Goaltending leaders ====
Only the top five goaltenders, based on save percentage, who have played at least 40% of their team's minutes, are included in this list.

Player	TOI	GA	GAA	SA	Sv%	SO
(Estonia) Sofia Salamatina	180:00	2	0.67	73	97.26	1
(Estonia) Uljana Jeggi	120:00	1	0.50	29	96.55	1
(Israel) Yael Fatiev	278:09	10	2.16	158	93.67	0
(South Africa) Sone Geldenhuys	179:30	6	2.01	59	89.83	0
(Philippines) Mikaella Lee	140:00	4	1.71	39	89.74	1

TOI = time on ice (minutes:seconds); SA = shots against; GA = goals against; GAA = goals against average; Sv% = save percentage; SO = shutouts
Source: IIHF.com

=== Awards ===
Position	Player
Goaltender	(Estonia) Sofia Salamatina
Defenceman	(South Africa) Donne von Doesburgh
Forward	(Estonia) Aleksandra Stolyarova
