= 2026 Women's Ice Hockey World Championships =

Tournament details
- Host countries: Denmark; Hungary; Spain; Slovenia; Hong Kong; Croatia; Estonia

The 2026 Women's Ice Hockey World Championships was the 29th such series of tournaments organized by the International Ice Hockey Federation. Teams participated at several levels of competition based on their 2025 results. The competition also serves as qualifications for division placements in the 2027 edition.

As in 2025, teams from Russia and Belarus will not be allowed to enter, as they remain suspended by the IIHF due to the countries' invasion of Ukraine.

== Championship (Top Division) ==
The tournament was held from 6 to 16 November 2026 in Herning and Esbjerg, Denmark. For the first time since 2011, Group A has not been seeded higher than Group B.

=== Group A ===
| Pos | Team | Pld | W | OTW | OTL | L | GF | GA | GD | Pts | Qualification |
|---|---|---|---|---|---|---|---|---|---|---|---|
| 1 | United States | 4 | 4 | 0 | 0 | 0 | 31 | 2 | +29 | 12 | Quarterfinals |
| 2 | Germany | 4 | 2 | 1 | 0 | 1 | 7 | 7 | 0 | 8 | Quarterfinals |
| 3 | Switzerland | 4 | 1 | 1 | 0 | 2 | 7 | 13 | −6 | 5 (Note: Czech Republic 1–2 Switzerland) | Quarterfinals |
| 4 | Czechia | 4 | 1 | 0 | 2 | 1 | 7 | 13 | −6 | 5 | Quarterfinals |
| 5 | Austria | 4 | 0 | 0 | 0 | 4 | 4 | 21 | −17 | 0 | Relegation playoff |

Source: IIHF
Rules for classification: 1) points; 2) head-to-head points; 3) head-to-head goal difference; 4) head-to-head number of goals scored; 5) result against closest best-ranked team outside tied teams; 6) result against second-best ranked team outside tied teams; 7) seeding before tournament.

=== Group B ===
| Pos | Team | Pld | W | OTW | OTL | L | GF | GA | GD | Pts | Qualification or relegation |
|---|---|---|---|---|---|---|---|---|---|---|---|
| 1 | Canada | 4 | 4 | 0 | 0 | 0 | 26 | 1 | +25 | 12 | Quarterfinals |
| 2 | Sweden | 4 | 3 | 0 | 0 | 1 | 20 | 6 | +14 | 9 | Quarterfinals |
| 3 | Finland | 4 | 2 | 0 | 0 | 2 | 13 | 9 | +4 | 6 | Quarterfinals |
| 4 | Denmark (H) | 4 | 0 | 1 | 0 | 3 | 4 | 26 | −22 | 2 | Quarterfinals |
| 5 | Japan | 4 | 0 | 0 | 1 | 3 | 4 | 25 | −21 | 1 | Relegation playoff |

Source: IIHF
Rules for classification: 1) points; 2) head-to-head points; 3) head-to-head goal difference; 4) head-to-head number of goals scored; 5) result against closest best-ranked team outside tied teams; 6) result against second-best ranked team outside tied teams; 7) seeding before tournament.
(H) Host

=== Knockout stage ===
Quarterfinals
13 November
A1 United States | 14
B4 Denmark | 0
13 November
B2 Sweden | 1
A3 Switzerland | 0
13 November
B1 Canada | 3
A4 Czechia | 2
13 November
A2 Germany | 0
B3 Finland | 6

Semifinals
15 November
1 United States | 5
5 Finland | 0
15 November
2 Canada | 3
3 Sweden | 0

Final
16 November
1 United States | 6
2 Canada | 2
Third place match
16 November
3 Sweden (GWS) | 2
5 Finland | 1

=== Final standings ===
| Pos | Grp | Team | Pld | W | OTW | OTL | L | GF | GA | GD | Pts | Final Result |
|---|---|---|---|---|---|---|---|---|---|---|---|---|
| 1 | A | United States | 7 | 7 | 0 | 0 | 0 | 56 | 4 | +52 | 21 | Champions |
| 2 | B | Canada | 7 | 6 | 0 | 0 | 1 | 34 | 9 | +25 | 18 | Runners-up |
| 3 | B | Sweden | 7 | 5 | 0 | 0 | 2 | 23 | 11 | +12 | 15 | Third place |
| 4 | B | Finland | 7 | 3 | 0 | 0 | 4 | 20 | 15 | +5 | 9 | Fourth place |
| 5 | A | Germany | 5 | 2 | 1 | 0 | 2 | 7 | 13 | −6 | 8 | Eliminated in quarterfinals |
| 6 | A | Switzerland | 5 | 1 | 1 | 0 | 3 | 7 | 14 | −7 | 5 | Eliminated in quarterfinals |
| 7 | A | Czechia | 5 | 1 | 0 | 2 | 2 | 9 | 16 | −7 | 5 | Eliminated in quarterfinals |
| 8 | B | Denmark | 5 | 0 | 1 | 0 | 4 | 4 | 40 | −36 | 2 | Eliminated in quarterfinals |
| 9 | A | Austria | 5 | 0 | 1 | 0 | 4 | 6 | 22 | −16 | 2 | Avoided relegation |
| 10 | B | Japan | 5 | 0 | 0 | 2 | 3 | 5 | 27 | −22 | 2 | Relegated to the 2027 Division I A |

Source: IIHF

== Division I ==
=== Group A ===
The tournament was held in Budapest, Hungary from 12 to 18 April 2026.

| Pos | Team | Pld | W | OTW | OTL | L | GF | GA | GD | Pts | Promotion or relegation |
|---|---|---|---|---|---|---|---|---|---|---|---|
| 1 | France | 5 | 3 | 1 | 1 | 0 | 20 | 9 | +11 | 12 | Promoted to the 2027 Top Division |
| 2 | Hungary (H) | 5 | 3 | 1 | 0 | 1 | 14 | 7 | +7 | 11 | |
| 3 | Italy | 5 | 3 | 0 | 1 | 1 | 19 | 11 | +8 | 10 | |
| 4 | Slovakia | 5 | 3 | 0 | 0 | 2 | 19 | 10 | +9 | 9 | |
| 5 | Norway | 5 | 1 | 0 | 0 | 4 | 8 | 15 | −7 | 3 | |
| 6 | China | 5 | 0 | 0 | 0 | 5 | 1 | 30 | −29 | 0 | Relegated to the 2027 Division I B |

Source: IIHF
Rules for classification: 1) points; 2) head-to-head points; 3) head-to-head goal difference; 4) head-to-head number of goals scored; 5) result against closest best-ranked team outside tied teams; 6) result against second-best ranked team outside tied teams; 7) seeding before tournament.
(H) Host

=== Group B ===
The tournament was held in Puigcerdà, Spain from 12 to 18 April 2026.

| Pos | Team | Pld | W | OTW | OTL | L | GF | GA | GD | Pts | Promotion or relegation |
|---|---|---|---|---|---|---|---|---|---|---|---|
| 1 | Netherlands | 5 | 4 | 0 | 1 | 0 | 18 | 4 | +14 | 13 | Promoted to the 2027 Division I A |
| 2 | Great Britain | 5 | 2 | 2 | 1 | 0 | 13 | 9 | +4 | 11 | |
| 3 | Kazakhstan | 5 | 2 | 0 | 1 | 2 | 10 | 14 | −4 | 7 (Note: Kazakhstan 4–3 South Korea) | |
| 4 | South Korea | 5 | 2 | 0 | 1 | 2 | 16 | 17 | −1 | 7 | |
| 5 | Latvia | 5 | 0 | 2 | 0 | 3 | 16 | 21 | −5 | 4 | |
| 6 | Spain (H) | 5 | 1 | 0 | 0 | 4 | 8 | 16 | −8 | 3 | Relegated to the 2027 Division II A |

Source: IIHF
Rules for classification: 1) points; 2) head-to-head points; 3) head-to-head goal difference; 4) head-to-head number of goals scored; 5) result against closest best-ranked team outside tied teams; 6) result against second-best ranked team outside tied teams; 7) seeding before tournament.
(H) Host

== Division II ==
=== Group A ===
The tournament was held in Bled, Slovenia from 13 to 19 April 2026.

| Pos | Team | Pld | W | OTW | OTL | L | GF | GA | GD | Pts | Promotion or relegation |
|---|---|---|---|---|---|---|---|---|---|---|---|
| 1 | Poland | 4 | 4 | 0 | 0 | 0 | 23 | 2 | +21 | 12 | Promotion to the 2027 Division I B |
| 2 | Slovenia (H) | 4 | 2 | 0 | 0 | 2 | 14 | 12 | +2 | 6 | |
| 3 | Chinese Taipei | 4 | 0 | 2 | 0 | 2 | 10 | 22 | −12 | 4 (Note: Chinese Taipei 4 Pts, Australia 4 Pts, Iceland 1 Pt. Chinese Taipei 2–1 (GWS) Australia.) | |
| 4 | Australia | 4 | 1 | 0 | 1 | 2 | 8 | 13 | −5 | 4 | |
| 5 | Iceland | 4 | 1 | 0 | 1 | 2 | 9 | 15 | −6 | 4 | Relegation to the 2027 Division II B |
| – | North Korea (Note: North Korea withdrew before the tournament.) | 0 | 0 | 0 | 0 | 0 | 0 | 0 | 0 | 0 | |

Source: IIHF
Rules for classification: 1) points; 2) head-to-head points; 3) head-to-head goal difference; 4) head-to-head number of goals scored; 5) result against closest best-ranked team outside tied teams; 6) result against second-best ranked team outside tied teams; 7) seeding before tournament.
(H) Host

=== Group B ===
The tournament was held in Hong Kong from 30 March to 5 April 2026.

| Pos | Team | Pld | W | OTW | OTL | L | GF | GA | GD | Pts | Promotion or relegation |
|---|---|---|---|---|---|---|---|---|---|---|---|
| 1 | Hong Kong (H) | 5 | 5 | 0 | 0 | 0 | 19 | 7 | +12 | 15 | Promotion to the 2027 Division II A |
| 2 | Lithuania | 5 | 3 | 1 | 0 | 1 | 15 | 11 | +4 | 11 | |
| 3 | Ukraine | 5 | 3 | 0 | 1 | 1 | 20 | 11 | +9 | 10 | |
| 4 | New Zealand | 5 | 2 | 0 | 0 | 3 | 15 | 18 | −3 | 6 | |
| 5 | Mexico | 5 | 1 | 0 | 0 | 4 | 14 | 18 | −4 | 3 | |
| 6 | Belgium | 5 | 0 | 0 | 0 | 5 | 10 | 28 | −18 | 0 | Relegation to the 2027 Division III A |

Source: IIHF
Rules for classification: 1) points; 2) head-to-head points; 3) head-to-head goal difference; 4) head-to-head number of goals scored; 5) result against closest best-ranked team outside tied teams; 6) result against second-best ranked team outside tied teams; 7) seeding before tournament.
(H) Host

== Division III ==
=== Group A ===
The tournament was held in Zagreb, Croatia from 23 February to 1 March 2026.

| Pos | Team | Pld | W | OTW | OTL | L | GF | GA | GD | Pts | Promotion or relegation |
|---|---|---|---|---|---|---|---|---|---|---|---|
| 1 | Romania | 5 | 3 | 1 | 0 | 1 | 18 | 9 | +9 | 11 | Promoted to the 2027 Division II B |
| 2 | Thailand | 5 | 3 | 0 | 1 | 1 | 15 | 13 | +2 | 10 | |
| 3 | Turkey | 5 | 3 | 0 | 0 | 2 | 14 | 15 | −1 | 9 | |
| 4 | Croatia (H) | 5 | 2 | 1 | 0 | 2 | 16 | 11 | +5 | 8 | |
| 5 | Serbia | 5 | 0 | 1 | 2 | 2 | 13 | 18 | −5 | 4 | |
| 6 | Bulgaria | 5 | 0 | 1 | 1 | 3 | 10 | 20 | −10 | 3 | Relegated to the 2027 Division III B |

Source: IIHF
Rules for classification: 1) points; 2) head-to-head points; 3) head-to-head goal difference; 4) head-to-head number of goals scored; 5) result against closest best-ranked team outside tied teams; 6) result against second-best ranked team outside tied teams; 7) seeding before tournament.
(H) Host

=== Group B ===
The tournament was held in Kohtla-Järve, Estonia from 28 February to 5 March 2026.

| Pos | Team | Pld | W | OTW | OTL | L | GF | GA | GD | Pts | Promotion |
|---|---|---|---|---|---|---|---|---|---|---|---|
| 1 | Estonia (H) | 5 | 5 | 0 | 0 | 0 | 37 | 3 | +34 | 15 | Promoted to the 2027 Division III A |
| 2 | Bosnia and Herzegovina | 5 | 4 | 0 | 0 | 1 | 25 | 12 | +13 | 12 | |
| 3 | South Africa | 5 | 2 | 0 | 0 | 3 | 11 | 14 | −3 | 6 (Note: South Africa 3 Pts, +1 GD; Israel 3 Pts, 0 GD; Philippines 3 Pts, −1 GD.) | |
| 4 | Israel | 5 | 2 | 0 | 0 | 3 | 19 | 12 | +7 | 6 | |
| 5 | Philippines | 5 | 2 | 0 | 0 | 3 | 15 | 19 | −4 | 6 | |
| 6 | Singapore | 5 | 0 | 0 | 0 | 5 | 2 | 49 | −47 | 0 | |

Source: IIHF
Rules for classification: 1) points; 2) head-to-head points; 3) head-to-head goal difference; 4) head-to-head number of goals scored; 5) result against closest best-ranked team outside tied teams; 6) result against second-best ranked team outside tied teams; 7) seeding before tournament.
(H) Host

== See also ==
- 2026 Men's Ice Hockey World Championships
