= 2025 Women's Ice Hockey World Championships =

Tournament details
- Host countries: Czechia; China; Great Britain; Poland; New Zealand; Serbia; Bosnia and Herzegovina

Final positions
- Champions: United States (11th title)

The 2025 Women's Ice Hockey World Championships were the 28th such series of tournaments organized by the International Ice Hockey Federation. Teams participated at several levels of competition based on their 2024 results. The competition served as qualifications for division placements in the 2026 edition.

As in 2024, teams from Russia and Belarus were not allowed to enter, as they remained suspended by the IIHF due to the countries' invasion of Ukraine.

== Championship (Top Division) ==
The tournament was held in České Budějovice, Czechia between 9 and 20 April 2025.

=== Group A ===
Pos	Team	Pld	W	OTW	OTL	L	GF	GA	GD	Pts	Qualification
1	United States	4	4	0	0	0	18	2	+16	12	Quarterfinals
2	Canada	4	3	0	0	1	17	3	+14	9	Quarterfinals
3	Finland	4	2	0	0	2	7	15	−8	6	Quarterfinals
4	Czechia (H)	4	1	0	0	3	6	15	−9	3	Quarterfinals
5	Switzerland	4	0	0	0	4	1	14	−13	0	Quarterfinals

Source: IIHF
Rules for classification: 1) points; 2) head-to-head points; 3) head-to-head goal difference; 4) head-to-head number of goals scored; 5) result against closest best-ranked team outside tied teams; 6) result against second-best ranked team outside tied teams; 7) seeding before tournament.
(H) Host

=== Group B ===
Pos	Team	Pld	W	OTW	OTL	L	GF	GA	GD	Pts	Qualification or relegation
1	Sweden	4	4	0	0	0	17	2	+15	12	Quarterfinals
2	Japan	4	3	0	0	1	8	4	+4	9	Quarterfinals
3	Germany	4	2	0	0	2	11	9	+2	6	Quarterfinals
4	Norway	4	1	0	0	3	7	18	−11	3	Relegated to the 2026 Division I
5	Hungary	4	0	0	0	4	1	11	−10	0	Relegated to the 2026 Division I

Source: IIHF
Rules for classification: 1) points; 2) head-to-head points; 3) head-to-head goal difference; 4) head-to-head number of goals scored; 5) result against closest best-ranked team outside tied teams; 6) result against second-best ranked team outside tied teams; 7) seeding before tournament.

=== Knockout stage ===
Quarterfinals
17 April
A1 United States	3
B3 Germany	0
17 April
A2 Canada	9
B2 Japan	1
17 April
A3 Finland	3
B1 Sweden	2
17 April
A4 Czechia	7
A5 Switzerland	0

Semifinals
19 April
1 United States	2
4 Czechia	1
19 April
2 Canada	8
3 Finland	1

Final
20 April
1 United States (OT)	4
2 Canada	3
Third place
20 April
3 Finland (OT)	4
4 Czechia	3

== Division I ==
=== Group A ===
The tournament was held in Shenzhen, China between 13 and 19 April 2025.

Pos	Team	Pld	W	OTW	OTL	L	GF	GA	GD	Pts	Promotion or relegation
1	Austria	5	4	1	0	0	15	5	+10	14	Promoted to the 2026 Top Division
2	Denmark	5	3	0	0	2	10	8	+2	9 (Note: Denmark 2–0 Slovakia)	Promoted to the 2026 Top Division
3	Slovakia	5	3	0	0	2	14	7	+7	9	
4	France	5	2	1	0	2	15	13	+2	8	
5	China (H)	5	1	0	1	3	4	12	−8	4	
6	Netherlands	5	0	0	1	4	10	23	−13	1	Relegated to the 2026 Division I B

Source: IIHF
Rules for classification: 1) points; 2) head-to-head points; 3) head-to-head goal difference; 4) head-to-head number of goals scored; 5) result against closest best-ranked team outside tied teams; 6) result against second-best ranked team outside tied teams; 7) seeding before tournament.
(H) Host

=== Group B ===
The tournament was held in Dumfries, Great Britain between 9 and 15 April 2025.

Pos	Team	Pld	W	OTW	OTL	L	GF	GA	GD	Pts	Promotion or relegation
1	Italy	5	5	0	0	0	31	0	+31	15	Promoted to the 2026 Division I A
2	Latvia	5	4	0	0	1	24	12	+12	12	
3	Great Britain (H)	5	2	0	1	2	12	12	0	7	
4	Kazakhstan	5	2	0	0	3	16	14	+2	6	
5	South Korea	5	1	1	0	3	12	19	−7	5	
6	Slovenia	5	0	0	0	5	8	46	−38	0	Relegated to the 2026 Division II A

Source: IIHF
Rules for classification: 1) points; 2) head-to-head points; 3) head-to-head goal difference; 4) head-to-head number of goals scored; 5) result against closest best-ranked team outside tied teams; 6) result against second-best ranked team outside tied teams; 7) seeding before tournament.
(H) Host

== Division II ==
=== Group A ===
The tournament was held in Bytom, Poland between 7 and 13 April 2025.

Pos	Team	Pld	W	OTW	OTL	L	GF	GA	GD	Pts	Promotion or relegation
1	Spain	5	4	0	1	0	23	6	+17	13	Promoted to the 2026 Division I B
2	Poland (H)	5	4	0	0	1	30	8	+22	12	
3	Iceland	5	3	1	0	1	12	8	+4	11	
4	Chinese Taipei	5	1	1	0	3	8	20	−12	5	
5	North Korea	5	0	1	0	4	5	19	−14	2 (Note: Mexico 1–2 North Korea)	
6	Mexico	5	0	0	2	3	7	24	−17	2	Relegated to the 2026 Division II B

Source: IIHF
Rules for classification: 1) points; 2) head-to-head points; 3) head-to-head goal difference; 4) head-to-head number of goals scored; 5) result against closest best-ranked team outside tied teams; 6) result against second-best ranked team outside tied teams; 7) seeding before tournament.
(H) Host

=== Group B ===
The tournament was held in Dunedin, New Zealand between 14 and 20 April 2025.

Pos	Team	Pld	W	OTW	OTL	L	GF	GA	GD	Pts	Promotion or relegation
1	Australia	5	4	1	0	0	24	4	+20	14	Promoted to the 2026 Division II A
2	New Zealand (H)	5	3	1	1	0	17	12	+5	12	
3	Ukraine	5	3	0	1	1	25	12	+13	10	
4	Belgium	5	1	0	1	3	11	21	−10	4	
5	Hong Kong	5	1	0	0	4	10	30	−20	3	
6	Turkey	5	0	1	0	4	9	17	−8	2	Relegated to the 2026 Division III A

Source: IIHF
Rules for classification: 1) points; 2) head-to-head points; 3) head-to-head goal difference; 4) head-to-head number of goals scored; 5) result against closest best-ranked team outside tied teams; 6) result against second-best ranked team outside tied teams; 7) seeding before tournament.
(H) Host

== Division III ==
=== Group A ===
The tournament was held in Belgrade, Serbia between 2 and 8 March 2025.

Pos	Team	Pld	W	OTW	OTL	L	GF	GA	GD	Pts	Promotion or relegation
1	Lithuania	5	3	1	0	1	20	8	+12	11	Promoted to the 2026 Division II B
2	Thailand	5	3	0	1	1	16	9	+7	10	
3	Serbia (H)	5	3	0	0	2	15	10	+5	9 (Note: Serbia 2–0 Romania)	
4	Romania	5	3	0	0	2	19	11	+8	9	
5	Croatia	5	2	0	0	3	13	13	0	6	
6	South Africa	5	0	0	0	5	11	43	−32	0	Relegated to the 2026 Division III B

Source: IIHF
Rules for classification: 1) points; 2) head-to-head points; 3) head-to-head goal difference; 4) head-to-head number of goals scored; 5) result against closest best-ranked team outside tied teams; 6) result against second-best ranked team outside tied teams; 7) seeding before tournament.
(H) Host

=== Group B ===
The tournament was held in Sarajevo, Bosnia and Herzegovina between 13 and 18 February 2025.

Pos	Team	Pld	W	OTW	OTL	L	GF	GA	GD	Pts	Promotion
1	Bulgaria	4	3	0	1	0	19	9	+10	10	Promoted to the 2026 Division III A
2	Israel	4	2	1	0	1	17	10	+7	8	
3	Estonia	4	2	0	1	1	11	11	0	7	
4	Bosnia and Herzegovina (H)	4	1	1	0	2	16	14	+2	5	
5	Singapore	4	0	0	0	4	4	23	−19	0	

Source: IIHF
Rules for classification: 1) points; 2) head-to-head points; 3) head-to-head goal difference; 4) head-to-head number of goals scored; 5) result against closest best-ranked team outside tied teams; 6) result against second-best ranked team outside tied teams; 7) seeding before tournament.
(H) Host
