= 2027 IIHF Women's World Championship Division IV =

Tournament details
- Host country: TBD
- Venue: 1 (in 1 host city)
- Dates: TBD
- Teams: 4

The 2027 IIHF Women's World Championship Division IV was scheduled to consist of two international ice hockey tournaments organized by the International Ice Hockey Federation. Divisions IV represent the ninth tier of the IIHF IIHF Women's World Championship.

It also marked a change in the IIHF women's calendar, with the tournaments being moved from April to November.

The tournament was cancelled in September 2026 and the teams moved to Division III B.

== Participants ==
Team	Qualification
Singapore	Placed 6th in Division III B in 2026 and were relegated.
Iran	First time participating after withdrawing in 2024.
India	First time participating.
Belarus	First time participating.
