= 2027 Women's Ice Hockey World Championships =

Tournament details
- Host country: Canada

The 2027 Women's Ice Hockey World Championships will be the 30th such event hosted by the International Ice Hockey Federation. Teams participate at several levels of competition based on their 2026 results. The competition will also serve as qualifications for division placements in the 2028 edition. It is also marks a change in the IIHF women's calendar, with the tournaments being moved from April to November.

Originally, as in 2026, Russia was not going to be allowed to enter, as they remained suspended by the IIHF due to the countries' invasion of Ukraine. However, the Court of Arbitration for Sport has told the IIHF that Russia must immediately be added to all competitions. A decision on how it will be done has yet to be made. Belarus was allowed to enter before the CAS ruling.

All lower divisions will play their tournament with two groups, a knockout stage and the winner of the final to be promoted. The last-placed teams of each group will play a two-game series to determine the relegated team.

== Championship (Top Division) ==
The tournament will be held in Quebec City, Canada in November 2027.

Teams

- Austria
- Canada
- Czechia
- Denmark
- Finland
- France
- Germany
- Sweden
- Switzerland
- United States

== Division I ==
=== Group A ===
The tournament will be held in Milan, Italy from 8 to 14 November 2027.

Teams

- Hungary
- Japan
- Italy
- Netherlands
- Norway
- Slovakia

=== Group B ===
The tournament will be held in Suwon, South Korea from 1 to 7 November 2027.

Teams

- China
- Great Britain
- Kazakhstan
- Latvia
- Poland
- South Korea

== Division II ==
=== Group A ===
The tournament will be held in Taipei, Chinese Taipei from 7 to 13 November 2027.

Teams

- Australia
- Chinese Taipei
- Iceland
- North Korea
- Slovenia
- Spain

=== Group B ===
The tournament will be held in Elektrėnai, Lithuania from 8 to 14 November 2027.

Teams

- Hong Kong
- Lithuania
- Mexico
- New Zealand
- Romania
- Ukraine

== Division III ==
=== Group A ===
The tournament will be held in Istanbul, Turkey from 22 to 28 November 2027.

Teams

- Belgium
- Croatia
- Estonia
- Serbia
- Thailand
- Turkey

=== Group B ===
The tournament will be held in Sofia, Bulgaria.

Teams

- Belarus
- Bosnia and Herzegovina
- Bulgaria
- India
- Iran
- Israel
- Philippines
- Singapore
- South Africa

== See also ==
- 2027 Men's Ice Hockey World Championships
