= Time in Croatia =

- Time zone: Central European Time
- Initials: CET
- UTC offset: UTC+01:00
- Time notation: 24-hour clock

Daylight saving time
- Name: Central European Summer Time
- Initials: CEST
- UTC offset: UTC+02:00
- Start: Last Sunday in March (02:00 CET)
- End: Last Sunday in October (03:00 CEST)

tz database
- Europe/Zagreb

In Croatia, the standard time is Central European Time (CET; UTC+01:00). Daylight saving time is observed from the last Sunday in March (02:00 CET) to the last Sunday in October (03:00 CEST). During daylight saving time, Croatia uses Central European Summer Time (CEST; UTC+02:00).

== Time notation ==
In formal and written language, the time of day is usually expressed using the 24-hour clock. Hours and minutes are separated using either a colon or a full stop. Leading zeroes should only be used for minutes, except in tables, on electronic displays etc. In informal use, especially in speech, the 12-hour clock is used. However, instead of the English "a.m."/"p.m." system, descriptive phrases are used in cases of ambiguity, e.g. ujutro "in the morning", prijepodne "before noon", poslijepodne "afternoon", navečer "in the evening".

== IANA time zone database ==
In the IANA time zone database, Croatia is given the zone Europe/Zagreb.

c.c.*	coordinates*	TZ*	Comments	UTC offset	DST
HR	+4548+01558	Europe/Zagreb		+01:00	+02:00

== See also ==
- Time in Europe
- List of time zones by country
- List of time zones by UTC offset
