= Luisa Wilson =

Mexican ice hockey player (born 2005)

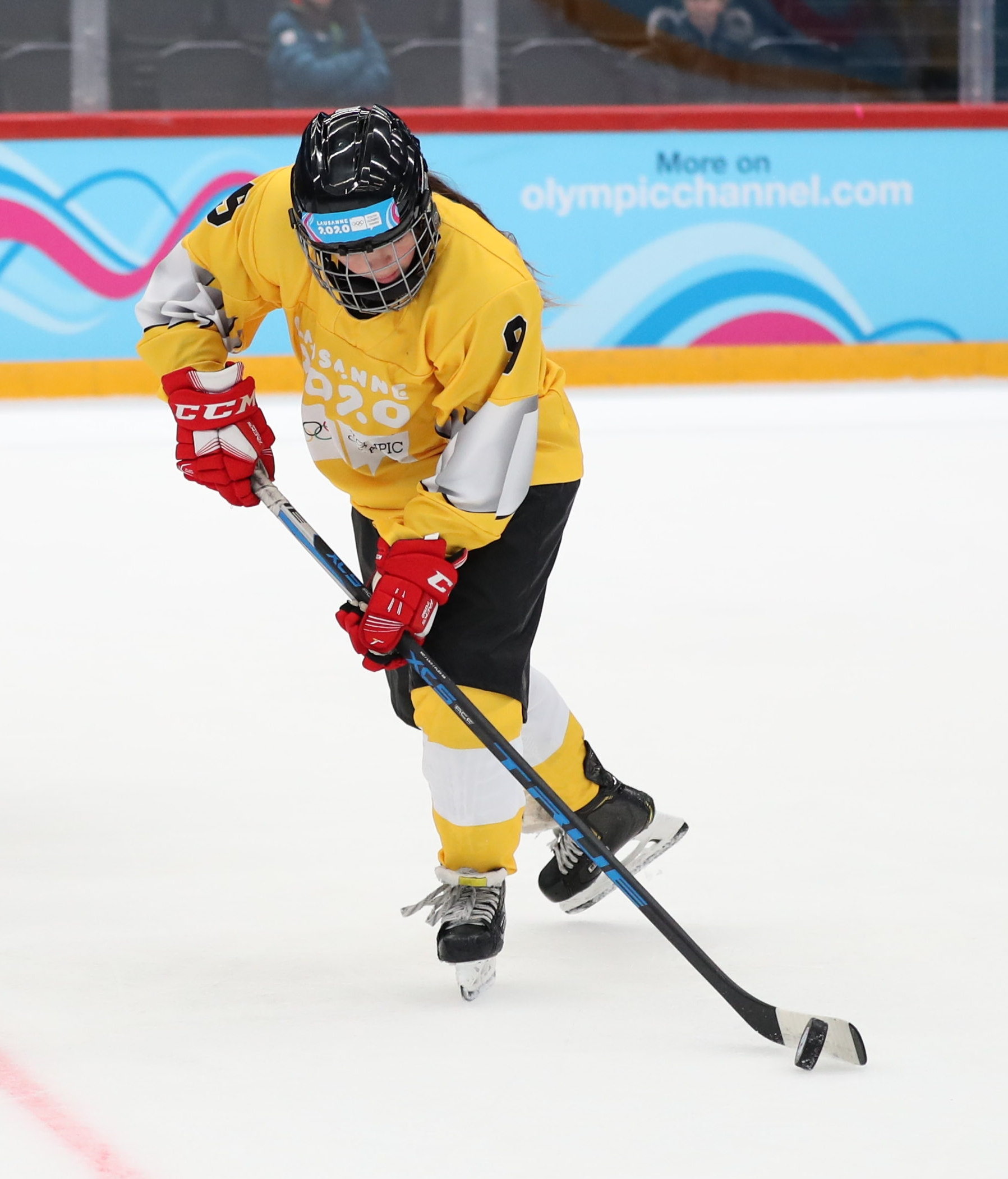
- Wilson at the girls' 3x3 mixed ice hockey tournament at the 2020 Winter Youth Olympics.
- Born: 5 August 2005 (age 21) Celaya, Guanajuato, Mexico
- Height: 162 cm (5 ft 4 in)
- Weight: 62 kg (137 lb; 9 st 11 lb)
- Position: Forward
- Shoots: Left
- OWHL team Former teams: North York Storm; Osos
- National team: Mexico
- Playing career: c. 2019–present
Medal record
Women's ice hockey
Representing Mixed-NOCs
Winter Youth Olympic Games
Gold medal – first place	2020 Lausanne	3x3 mixed tournament

Luisa Wilson San Román (born 5 August 2005) is a Mexican ice hockey player who plays in the U18 AA league of the Ontario Women's Hockey Association (OWHL) with the North York Storm Prep U18 AA in the North York district of Toronto, Canada.

Wilson won the gold medal with her team in the girls' 3x3 mixed tournament at the 2020 Winter Youth Olympics in Lausanne, Switzerland, on January 15, 2020, making her the first Mexican to do so. She also competed at the 2020 IIHF World Women's U18 Championship – Division II Group B where she won a bronze medal with the Mexican national under-18 team.

== Early life ==
Luisa Wilson San Román was born on 5 August 2005 in Celaya, Guanajuato to a Mexican mother, Laura San Román and a Canadian father, Brian Wilson, a chiropractor in Mexico City and assistant coach for the Mexico women's national ice hockey team. Wilson has played ice hockey since she was 2 or 3 years old, and she also practiced figure skating.

== Career ==
=== Lausanne 2020 ===
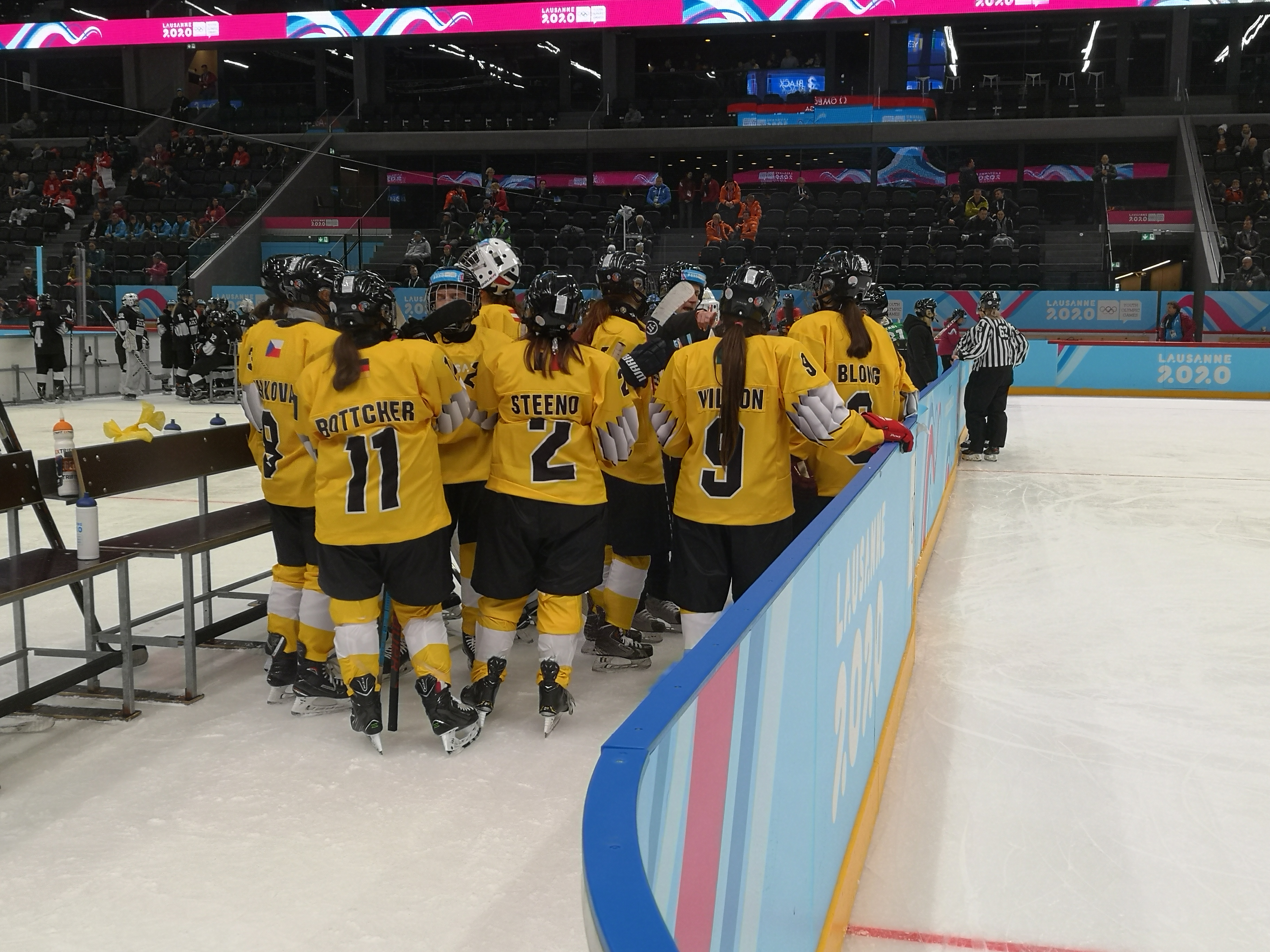
Wilson (number 9) and her Lausanne 2020 team during a match

Wilson was selected to represent Mexico at the 2020 Winter Youth Olympics, in Lausanne, Switzerland, with the Yellow team of the girls' 3x3 mixed ice hockey tournament. Along with athletes from Austria, Belgium, Czech Republic, France, Germany, Italy, the Netherlands, New Zealand, Norway, Spain, South Korea, and Switzerland, Wilson and her team defeated the Black team 6–1, achieving the gold medal, thus becoming the first Mexican to win an Olympic medal in a Winter Olympics sport.

=== 2020 IIHF World Women's U18 Championship ===
Wilson joined the Mexico women's national under-18 ice hockey team and competed at the 2020 IIHF World Women's U18 Championship – Division II. She played in five games and scored two goals overall. The team earned the bronze medal after defeating New Zealand 6–3.

=== Beijing 2022 ===
Wilson said she would have liked to represent Mexico at the 2022 Winter Olympics, which were held in Beijing, China.

=== Other achievements ===
Wilson was listed among Forbes's 100 Most Powerful Women of Mexico in 2020. Her name is inscribed on the walls of the Olympic Museum, making her the second Mexican woman to receive such honors after Enriqueta Basilio, the first woman to light the Olympic cauldron in 1968.

== Personal life ==
Wilson divides her time living between Toronto, Canada, and Mexico, with her parents and brothers.
