= 2027 IIHF Women's World Championship Division I =

Tournament details
- Host countries: Italy; South Korea
- Venues: 2 (in 2 host cities)
- Dates: 8–14 November; 1–7 November
- Teams: 12

The 2027 IIHF Women's World Championship Division I consists of two international ice hockey tournaments organized by the International Ice Hockey Federation. Divisions I A and I B represent the second and the third tier of the IIHF IIHF Women's World Championship.

This will mark the first year that the format is changed from having a single group with a round-robin, to a two-group group stage with three teams per group. The teams play the teams from the other group once. The top two placed teams qualify for the semifinals, which will be played against the team from the same group. The winners move on to the final to determine the promoted team. Third-placed teams from both groups face each other in a two-legged tie to play out the relegated team. It also marks a change in the IIHF women's calendar, with the tournaments being moved from April to November.

== Group A tournament ==
2026 IIHF Women's World Championship Division I A

Tournament details
- Host country: Italy
- City: Milan
- Venue: 1 (in 1 host city)
- Dates: 8–14 November
- Teams: 6

The tournament will be played in Milan, Italy from 8 to 14 November 2027.

=== Participants ===
Team	Qualification
Japan	Placed 10th in Top Division in 2026 and were relegated.
Hungary	Placed 2nd in Division I A in 2026.
Italy	Placed 3rd in Division I A in 2026.
Slovakia	Placed 4th in Division I A in 2026.
Norway	Placed 5th in Division I A in 2026.
Netherlands	Placed 1st in Division I B in 2026 and were promoted.

=== Preliminary round ===
==== Group A ====
Pos	Team	Pld	W	OTW	OTL	L	GF	GA	GD	Pts	Qualification
1	Japan	0	0	0	0	0	0	0	0	0	Knockout stage
2	Slovakia	0	0	0	0	0	0	0	0	0	Knockout stage
3	Norway	0	0	0	0	0	0	0	0	0	Relegation round

First match(es) will be played: 8 November 2027. Source:
Rules for classification: 1) points; 2) head-to-head points; 3) head-to-head goal difference; 4) head-to-head number of goals scored; 5) result against closest best-ranked team outside tied teams; 6) result against second-best ranked team outside tied teams; 7) seeding before tournament.

==== Group B ====
Pos	Team	Pld	W	OTW	OTL	L	GF	GA	GD	Pts	Qualification
1	Hungary	0	0	0	0	0	0	0	0	0	Knockout stage
2	Italy (H)	0	0	0	0	0	0	0	0	0	Knockout stage
3	Netherlands	0	0	0	0	0	0	0	0	0	Relegation round

First match(es) will be played: 8 November 2027. Source:
Rules for classification: 1) points; 2) head-to-head points; 3) head-to-head goal difference; 4) head-to-head number of goals scored; 5) result against closest best-ranked team outside tied teams; 6) result against second-best ranked team outside tied teams; 7) seeding before tournament.
(H) Host

=== Relegation round ===
Team 1	Agg.	Team 2	1st leg	2nd leg
A3		B3	November	November

=== Knockout stage ===
Semi-finals
November
A1
A2
November
B1
B2

Final
November
Third place
November

=== Final standings ===
Pos	Grp	Team	Pld	W	OTW	OTL	L	GF	GA	GD	Pts	Final result
1		TBD	0	0	0	0	0	0	0	0	0	Promoted to 2028 World Championship
2		TBD	0	0	0	0	0	0	0	0	0	Runners-up
3		TBD	0	0	0	0	0	0	0	0	0	Third place
4		TBD	0	0	0	0	0	0	0	0	0	Fourth place
5		TBD	0	0	0	0	0	0	0	0	0	Fifth place
6		TBD	0	0	0	0	0	0	0	0	0	Relegated to 2028 Division I A

First match(es) will be played: 8 November 2027. Source:
Rules for classification: 1) position in the group; 2) number of points; 3) goal difference; 4) goals scored; 5) seeding before tournament.

== Group B tournament ==
2027 IIHF Women's World Championship Division I B
Tournament details
- Host country: South Korea
- City: Suwon
- Venue: 1 (in 1 host city)
- Dates: 1–7 November
- Teams: 6

The tournament will be played in Suwon, South Korea from 1 to 7 November 2027.

=== Participants ===
Team	Qualification
China	Placed 6th in Division I A in 2026 and were relegated.
Great Britain	Placed 2nd in Division I B in 2026.
Kazakhstan	Placed 3rd in Division I B in 2026.
South Korea	Placed 4th in Division I B in 2026.
Latvia	Placed 5th in Division I B in 2026.
Poland	Placed 1st in Division II A in 2026 and were promoted.

=== Preliminary round ===
==== Group A ====
Pos	Team	Pld	W	OTW	OTL	L	GF	GA	GD	Pts	Qualification
1	China	0	0	0	0	0	0	0	0	0	Knockout stage
2	South Korea (H)	0	0	0	0	0	0	0	0	0	Knockout stage
3	Latvia	0	0	0	0	0	0	0	0	0	Relegation round

First match(es) will be played: 1 November 2027. Source:
Rules for classification: 1) points; 2) head-to-head points; 3) head-to-head goal difference; 4) head-to-head number of goals scored; 5) result against closest best-ranked team outside tied teams; 6) result against second-best ranked team outside tied teams; 7) seeding before tournament.
(H) Host

==== Group B ====
Pos	Team	Pld	W	OTW	OTL	L	GF	GA	GD	Pts	Qualification
1	Great Britain	0	0	0	0	0	0	0	0	0	Knockout stage
2	Kazakhstan	0	0	0	0	0	0	0	0	0	Knockout stage
3	Poland	0	0	0	0	0	0	0	0	0	Relegation round

First match(es) will be played: 1 November 2027. Source:
Rules for classification: 1) points; 2) head-to-head points; 3) head-to-head goal difference; 4) head-to-head number of goals scored; 5) result against closest best-ranked team outside tied teams; 6) result against second-best ranked team outside tied teams; 7) seeding before tournament.

=== Relegation round ===
Team 1	Agg.	Team 2	1st leg	2nd leg
A3		B3	November	November

=== Knockout stage ===
Semi-finals
November
A1
A2
November
B1
B2

Final
November
Third place
November

=== Final standings ===
Pos	Team	Pld	W	OTW	OTL	L	GF	GA	GD	Pts	Final result
1	TBD	0	0	0	0	0	0	0	0	0	Promoted to 2028 Division I A
2	TBD	0	0	0	0	0	0	0	0	0	Runners-up
3	TBD	0	0	0	0	0	0	0	0	0	Third place
4	TBD	0	0	0	0	0	0	0	0	0	Fourth place
5	TBD	0	0	0	0	0	0	0	0	0	Fifth place
6	TBD	0	0	0	0	0	0	0	0	0	Relegated to 2028 Division II A

First match(es) will be played: 1 November 2027. Source:
Rules for classification: 1) position in the group; 2) number of points; 3) goal difference; 4) goals scored; 5) seeding before tournament.
