= 2027 IIHF Women's World Championship Division III =

Tournament details
- Host countries: Turkey; Bulgaria
- Venues: 2 (in 2 host cities)
- Dates: 22–28 November; TBD
- Teams: 11

The 2027 IIHF Women's World Championship Division III consists of two international ice hockey tournaments organized by the International Ice Hockey Federation. Divisions I A and I B represent the sixth and the seventh tier of the IIHF IIHF Women's World Championship.

This will mark the first year that the format is changed from having a single group with a round-robin, to a two-group stage with three teams per group. Group A will play that way, Group B has five teams and play in a single round-robin. The teams play the teams from the other group once. The top two placed teams qualify for the semifinals, which will be played against the team from the same group. The winners move on to the final to determine the promoted team. Third-placed teams from both groups face each other in a two-legged tie to play out the relegated team. It also marks a change in the IIHF women's calendar, with the tournaments being moved from April to November.

== Group A tournament ==
2026 IIHF Women's World Championship Division III A
Tournament details
- Host country: Turkey
- City: Istanbul
- Venue: 1 (in 1 host city)
- Dates: 22–28 November
- Teams: 6

The tournament will be played in Istanbul, Turkey from 22 to 28 November 2027.

=== Participants ===
Team	Qualification
Belgium	Placed 6th in Division II B in 2026.
Thailand	Placed 2nd in Division III A in 2026.
Turkey	Placed 3rd in Division III A in 2026.
Croatia	Placed 4th in Division III A in 2026.
Serbia	Placed 5th in Division III A in 2026.
Estonia	Placed 1st in Division III B in 2026 and were promoted.

=== Preliminary round ===
==== Group A ====
Pos	Team	Pld	W	OTW	OTL	L	GF	GA	GD	Pts	Qualification
1	Belgium	0	0	0	0	0	0	0	0	0	Knockout stage
2	Croatia	0	0	0	0	0	0	0	0	0	Knockout stage
3	Serbia	0	0	0	0	0	0	0	0	0	Relegation round

First match(es) will be played: 22 November 2027. Source:
Rules for classification: 1) points; 2) head-to-head points; 3) head-to-head goal difference; 4) head-to-head number of goals scored; 5) result against closest best-ranked team outside tied teams; 6) result against second-best ranked team outside tied teams; 7) seeding before tournament.

==== Group B ====
Pos	Team	Pld	W	OTW	OTL	L	GF	GA	GD	Pts	Qualification
1	Thailand	0	0	0	0	0	0	0	0	0	Knockout stage
2	Turkey (H)	0	0	0	0	0	0	0	0	0	Knockout stage
3	Estonia	0	0	0	0	0	0	0	0	0	Relegation round

First match(es) will be played: 22 November 2027. Source:
Rules for classification: 1) points; 2) head-to-head points; 3) head-to-head goal difference; 4) head-to-head number of goals scored; 5) result against closest best-ranked team outside tied teams; 6) result against second-best ranked team outside tied teams; 7) seeding before tournament.
(H) Host

=== Relegation round ===
Team 1	Agg.	Team 2	1st leg	2nd leg
A3		B3	November	November

=== Knockout stage ===
Semi-finals
November
A1
A2
November
B1
B2

Final
November
Third place
November

=== Final standings ===
Pos	Grp	Team	Pld	W	OTW	OTL	L	GF	GA	GD	Pts	Final result
1		TBD	0	0	0	0	0	0	0	0	0	Promoted to 2028 Division II A
2		TBD	0	0	0	0	0	0	0	0	0	Runners-up
3		TBD	0	0	0	0	0	0	0	0	0	Third place
4		TBD	0	0	0	0	0	0	0	0	0	Fourth place
5		TBD	0	0	0	0	0	0	0	0	0	Fifth place
6		TBD	0	0	0	0	0	0	0	0	0	Relegated to 2028 Division III B

First match(es) will be played: 8 November 2027. Source:
Rules for classification: 1) position in the group; 2) number of points; 3) goal difference; 4) goals scored; 5) seeding before tournament.

== Group B tournament ==
2027 IIHF Women's World Championship Division III B
Tournament details
- Host country: Bulgaria
- City: Sofia
- Venue: 1 (in 1 host city)
- Dates: TBD
- Teams: 9

The tournament will be played in Sofia, Bulgaria. After the Division IV was cancelled, the teams were moved to participate in this tournament.

=== Participants ===
Team	Qualification
Bulgaria	Placed 6th in Division III A in 2026 and were relegated.
Bosnia and Herzegovina	Placed 2nd in Division III B in 2026.
South Africa	Placed 3rd in Division III B in 2026.
Israel	Placed 4th in Division III B in 2026.
Philippines	Placed 5th in Division III B in 2026.
Singapore	Placed 6th in Division III B in 2026 and were relegated.
Iran	First time participating after withdrawing in 2024.
India	First time participating.
Belarus	First time participating.

=== Preliminary round ===
==== Group A ====
Pos	Team	Pld	W	OTW	OTL	L	GF	GA	GD	Pts
1	Bulgaria (H)	0	0	0	0	0	0	0	0	0
2	Singapore	0	0	0	0	0	0	0	0	0
3	Belarus	0	0	0	0	0	0	0	0	0

First match(es) will be played: 2027. Source:
Rules for classification: 1) points; 2) head-to-head points; 3) head-to-head goal difference; 4) head-to-head number of goals scored; 5) result against closest best-ranked team outside tied teams; 6) result against second-best ranked team outside tied teams; 7) seeding before tournament.
(H) Host

==== Group B ====
Pos	Team	Pld	W	OTW	OTL	L	GF	GA	GD	Pts
1	Bosnia and Herzegovina	0	0	0	0	0	0	0	0	0
2	Philippines	0	0	0	0	0	0	0	0	0
3	India	0	0	0	0	0	0	0	0	0

First match(es) will be played: 2027. Source:
Rules for classification: 1) points; 2) head-to-head points; 3) head-to-head goal difference; 4) head-to-head number of goals scored; 5) result against closest best-ranked team outside tied teams; 6) result against second-best ranked team outside tied teams; 7) seeding before tournament.

==== Group C ====
Pos	Team	Pld	W	OTW	OTL	L	GF	GA	GD	Pts
1	South Africa	0	0	0	0	0	0	0	0	0
2	Israel	0	0	0	0	0	0	0	0	0
3	Iran	0	0	0	0	0	0	0	0	0

First match(es) will be played: 2027. Source:
Rules for classification: 1) points; 2) head-to-head points; 3) head-to-head goal difference; 4) head-to-head number of goals scored; 5) result against closest best-ranked team outside tied teams; 6) result against second-best ranked team outside tied teams; 7) seeding before tournament.
