= 2027 IIHF Women's World Championship Division II =

Tournament details
- Host countries: Chinese Taipei; Lithuania
- Venues: 2 (in 2 host cities)
- Dates: 7–13November; 8–14 November
- Teams: 12

The 2027 IIHF Women's World Championship Division II consists of two international ice hockey tournaments organized by the International Ice Hockey Federation. Divisions I A and I B represent the fourth and the fifth tier of the IIHF IIHF Women's World Championship.

This will mark the first year that the format is changed from having a single group with a round-robin, to a two-group group stage with three teams per group. The teams play the teams from the other group once. The top two placed teams qualify for the semifinals, which will be played against the team from the same group. The winners move on to the final to determine the promoted team. Third-placed teams from both groups face each other in a two-legged tie to play out the relegated team. It also marks a change in the IIHF women's calendar, with the tournaments being moved from April to November.

== Group A tournament ==
2026 IIHF Women's World Championship Division II A
Tournament details
- Host country: Chinese Taipei
- City: Taipei
- Venue: 1 (in 1 host city)
- Dates: 7–13 November
- Teams: 6

The tournament will be played in Taipei, Chinese Taipei from 7 to 13 November 2027.

=== Participants ===
Team	Qualification
Spain	Placed 6th in Division I B in 2026.
Slovenia	Placed 2nd in Division II A in 2026.
Chinese Taipei	Placed 3rd in Division II A in 2026.
Australia	Placed 4th in Division II A in 2026.
North Korea	Placed 5th in Division II A in 2026.
Hong Kong	Placed 1st in Division II B in 2026 and were promoted.

=== Preliminary round ===
==== Group A ====
Pos	Team	Pld	W	OTW	OTL	L	GF	GA	GD	Pts	Qualification
1	Spain	0	0	0	0	0	0	0	0	0	Knockout stage
2	Australia	0	0	0	0	0	0	0	0	0	Knockout stage
3	North Korea	0	0	0	0	0	0	0	0	0	Relegation round

First match(es) will be played: 7 November 2027. Source:
Rules for classification: 1) points; 2) head-to-head points; 3) head-to-head goal difference; 4) head-to-head number of goals scored; 5) result against closest best-ranked team outside tied teams; 6) result against second-best ranked team outside tied teams; 7) seeding before tournament.

==== Group B ====
Pos	Team	Pld	W	OTW	OTL	L	GF	GA	GD	Pts	Qualification
1	Slovenia	0	0	0	0	0	0	0	0	0	Knockout stage
2	Chinese Taipei (H)	0	0	0	0	0	0	0	0	0	Knockout stage
3	Hong Kong	0	0	0	0	0	0	0	0	0	Relegation round

First match(es) will be played: 8 November 2027. Source:
Rules for classification: 1) points; 2) head-to-head points; 3) head-to-head goal difference; 4) head-to-head number of goals scored; 5) result against closest best-ranked team outside tied teams; 6) result against second-best ranked team outside tied teams; 7) seeding before tournament.
(H) Host

=== Relegation round ===
Team 1	Agg.	Team 2	1st leg	2nd leg
A3		B3	November	November

=== Knockout stage ===
Semi-finals
November
A1
A2
November
B1
B2

Final
November
Third place
November

=== Final standings ===
Pos	Grp	Team	Pld	W	OTW	OTL	L	GF	GA	GD	Pts	Final result
1		TBD	0	0	0	0	0	0	0	0	0	Promoted to 2028 Division I B
2		TBD	0	0	0	0	0	0	0	0	0	Runners-up
3		TBD	0	0	0	0	0	0	0	0	0	Third place
4		TBD	0	0	0	0	0	0	0	0	0	Fourth place
5		TBD	0	0	0	0	0	0	0	0	0	Fifth place
6		TBD	0	0	0	0	0	0	0	0	0	Relegated to 2028 Division II B

First match(es) will be played: 8 November 2027. Source:
Rules for classification: 1) position in the group; 2) number of points; 3) goal difference; 4) goals scored; 5) seeding before tournament.

== Group B tournament ==
2027 IIHF Women's World Championship Division II B
Tournament details
- Host country: Lithuania
- City: Elektrėnai
- Venue: 1 (in 1 host city)
- Dates: 8–14 November
- Teams: 6

The tournament will be played in Elektrėnai, Lithuania from 8 to 14 November 2027.

=== Participants ===
Team	Qualification
Iceland	Placed 5th in Division II A in 2026 and were relegated.
Lithuania	Placed 2nd in Division II B in 2026.
Ukraine	Placed 3rd in Division II B in 2026.
New Zealand	Placed 4th in Division II B in 2026.
Mexico	Placed 5th in Division II B in 2026.
Romania	Placed 1st in Division III A in 2026 and were promoted.

=== Preliminary round ===
==== Group A ====
Pos	Team	Pld	W	OTW	OTL	L	GF	GA	GD	Pts	Qualification
1	Iceland	0	0	0	0	0	0	0	0	0	Knockout stage
2	New Zealand	0	0	0	0	0	0	0	0	0	Knockout stage
3	Mexico	0	0	0	0	0	0	0	0	0	Relegation round

First match(es) will be played: 8 November 2027. Source:
Rules for classification: 1) points; 2) head-to-head points; 3) head-to-head goal difference; 4) head-to-head number of goals scored; 5) result against closest best-ranked team outside tied teams; 6) result against second-best ranked team outside tied teams; 7) seeding before tournament.

==== Group B ====
Pos	Team	Pld	W	OTW	OTL	L	GF	GA	GD	Pts	Qualification
1	Lithuania (H)	0	0	0	0	0	0	0	0	0	Knockout stage
2	Ukraine	0	0	0	0	0	0	0	0	0	Knockout stage
3	Romania	0	0	0	0	0	0	0	0	0	Relegation round

First match(es) will be played: 8 November 2027. Source:
Rules for classification: 1) points; 2) head-to-head points; 3) head-to-head goal difference; 4) head-to-head number of goals scored; 5) result against closest best-ranked team outside tied teams; 6) result against second-best ranked team outside tied teams; 7) seeding before tournament.
(H) Host

=== Relegation round ===
Team 1	Agg.	Team 2	1st leg	2nd leg
A3		B3	November	November

=== Knockout stage ===
Semi-finals
November
A1
A2
November
B1
B2

Final
November
Third place
November

=== Final standings ===
Pos	Team	Pld	W	OTW	OTL	L	GF	GA	GD	Pts	Final result
1	TBD	0	0	0	0	0	0	0	0	0	Promoted to 2028 Division II A
2	TBD	0	0	0	0	0	0	0	0	0	Runners-up
3	TBD	0	0	0	0	0	0	0	0	0	Third place
4	TBD	0	0	0	0	0	0	0	0	0	Fourth place
5	TBD	0	0	0	0	0	0	0	0	0	Fifth place
6	TBD	0	0	0	0	0	0	0	0	0	Relegated to 2028 Division III A

First match(es) will be played: 8 November 2027. Source:
Rules for classification: 1) position in the group; 2) number of points; 3) goal difference; 4) goals scored; 5) seeding before tournament.
