= Belarus women's national ice hockey team =

Women's national ice hockey team representing Belarus

Belarus
- Association: Belarusian Ice Hockey Association
- Head coach: Lidia Malyavko
- Team colors
- IIHF code: BLR

Ranking
- Current IIHF: n/a

First international
- n/a

Biggest win
- Belarus 4–1 Piranha (juniors) (Raubichi, Belarus; 6 January 2023)

Biggest defeat
- Belarus 7–9 Armada (men) (Minsk, Belarus; 21 May 2023)

Olympics
- Appearances: 0

IIHF World Championships
- Appearances: 0

The Belarusian women's national ice hockey team (Belarusian: Жаночая зборная Беларусі па хакеі з шайбай; Russian: Женская сборная Беларуси по хоккею с шайбой) is the national women's ice hockey team that represents Belarus. The team is controlled by the Belarusian Ice Hockey Association.

== History ==
The Belarus women's national team played its first unofficial game in Raubichi on 6 January 2023, against the 'Piranha' club of boys born in 2011, which it won 4–1. National team players were between 10 and 25 years old. Its second game was in Minsk against the 'Armada' amateur men's team on 21 May 2023, which it lost 7–9. The team's head coach in this game was Lidia Malyavko. In October 2023, the first edition of the Belarus Women's Hockey League was started.

The Belarusian ice hockey national teams were suspended from the IIHF following Russia's invasion of Ukraine. However, this has been lifted and the women's national team will be eligible to play in the Division IV of the 2027 Women's Ice Hockey World Championships.
